= Kelsea Ballerini discography =

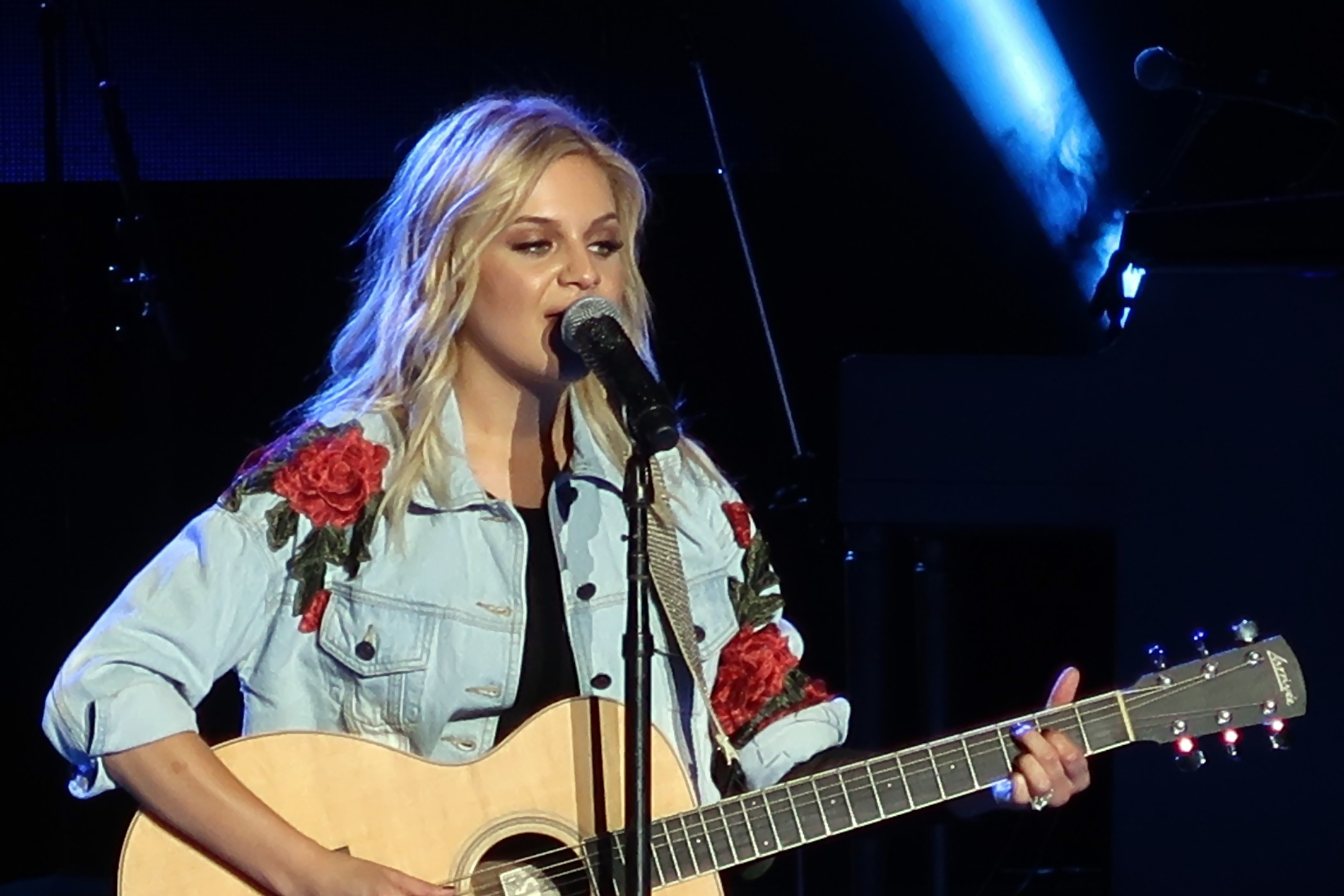
- Ballerini performing in 2017
- Studio albums: 5
- EPs: 3
- Compilation albums: 1
- Singles: 20
- Music videos: 21
- Remix albums: 1
- Promotional singles: 11
- Other charted songs: 5

American singer Kelsea Ballerini has released five studio albums, three extended plays, one compilation album, one remix album, and 14 singles, including two as a featured artist. Her first three singles all reached the top of the Billboard Country Airplay chart, making Ballerini the first female artist since Wynonna Judd in 1992 to accomplish this feat. The third such single, "Peter Pan", also made Ballerini the first female to top the Country Airplay and Hot Country Songs charts simultaneously since the latter was reformatted in 2012.

== Albums ==
=== Studio albums ===
Title	Details	Peak chart positions							Sales	Certifications
Title	Details	US	US Country	US Indie	AUS	CAN	UK	UK Country	Sales	Certifications
The First Time	Released: May 19, 2015; Label: Black River; Formats: CD, digital download, LP	31	4	4	33	—	—	—	US: 306,700	RIAA: Platinum; MC: Gold
Unapologetically	Released: November 3, 2017; Label: Black River; Formats: CD, digital download, LP	7	3	2	12	18	50	1	US: 156,700	RIAA: Gold; MC: Platinum
Kelsea	Released: March 20, 2020; Label: Black River; Formats: CD, digital download, LP	12	2	2	27	23	84	2		RIAA: Gold; MC: Gold
Subject to Change	Released: September 23, 2022; Label: Black River; Formats: CD, digital download, LP, streaming	18	3	4	82	72	—	1		
Patterns	Released: October 25, 2024; Label: Black River; Formats: CD, digital download, LP, streaming	4	1	1	48	22	—	1	US: 54,000	
"—" denotes a release that did not chart.

=== Compilation albums ===
Title	Details
Kelsea | Ballerini	Released: October 16, 2020; Label: Black River; Formats: CD

=== Remix albums ===
Title	Details	Peak chart positions		
Title	Details	US	US Country	US Indie
Ballerini	Released: September 11, 2020; Label: Black River; Formats: CD, digital download, LP	89	9	15

== Extended plays ==
Title	Details	Peak chart positions							Sales
Title	Details	US	US Country	US Heat	US Indie	AUS	CAN	UK Country	Sales
Kelsea Ballerini	Release date: November 24, 2014; Label: Black River; Format: Digital download	—	40	12	—	—	—	—	US: 7,400
Rolling Up the Welcome Mat	Release date: February 14, 2023; Label: Black River; Format: Digital download	48	11	—	5	—	96	4	
Mount Pleasant	Release date: November 14, 2025; Label: Black River	68	9	—	11	66	—	—	
"—" denotes a release that did not chart.

== Singles ==
=== As lead artist ===
Title	Year	Peak chart positions									Certifications	Album
Title	Year	US	US Country	US Country Airplay	US Country Digital	US Adult Pop	CAN	CAN Country	NZ Hot	UK	Certifications	Album
"Love Me Like You Mean It"	2014	45	5	1	9	—	61	3	—	—	RIAA: Platinum; MC: Platinum	The First Time
"Dibs"	2015	58	7	1	10	—	96	8	—	—	RIAA: Platinum; MC: Gold	The First Time
"Peter Pan"	2016	35	1	1	2	—	75	4	—	—	RIAA: 2× Platinum; MC: Platinum	The First Time
"Yeah Boy"	2016	65	9	3	22	—	—	2	—	—	RIAA: Platinum; MC: Platinum	The First Time
"Legends"	2017	68	10	1	17	—	—	3	—	—	RIAA: Gold; MC: Gold	Unapologetically
"I Hate Love Songs"	2018	— (Note: "I Hate Love Songs" did not enter the Billboard Hot 100, but peaked at number 25 on the Bubbling Under Hot 100 chart.)	28	25	13	—	—	—	—	—	RIAA: Gold; MC: Platinum	Unapologetically
"Miss Me More"	2018	47	7	2	2	17	70	1	—	—	RIAA: 3× Platinum; MC: 2× Platinum	Unapologetically
"Homecoming Queen?"	2019	65	14	17	2	—	—	15	30	—	RIAA: Platinum; ARIA: Gold; MC: Platinum	Kelsea
"The Other Girl" (with Halsey)	2020	95	19	52	3	17	—	—	18	—	RIAA: Gold; MC: Gold	Kelsea
"Hole in the Bottle"	2020	39	6	2	10	—	41	1	—	—	RIAA: Platinum; MC: 2× Platinum	Kelsea
"Half of My Hometown" (featuring Kenny Chesney)	2021	53	11	1	10	—	—	13	—	—	RIAA: 2× Platinum; ARIA: Gold; MC: Gold	Kelsea
"I Quit Drinking" (with LANY)	2021	—	30	—	8	19	—	—	31	—	RIAA: Platinum; ARIA: Gold; MC: Platinum	Non-album single
"Heartfirst"	2022	— (Note: "Heartfirst" did not enter the Billboard Hot 100, but peaked at number six on the Bubbling Under Hot 100 chart.)	25	22	4	24	—	33	—	—	RIAA: Gold	Subject to Change
"If You Go Down (I'm Goin' Down Too)"	2022	— (Note: "If You Go Down (I'm Goin' Down Too)" did not enter the Billboard Hot 100, but peaked at number 16 on the Bubbling Under Hot 100 chart.)	32	17	—	—	85	2	—	—	RIAA: Gold; ARIA: Gold; MC: Platinum	Subject to Change
"Blindsided"	2023	— (Note: "Blindsided" did not enter the Billboard Hot 100, but peaked at number 24 on the Bubbling Under Hot 100 chart.)	34	—	—	40	—	—	—	—	RIAA: Gold	Rolling Up the Welcome Mat
"Cowboys Cry Too" (with Noah Kahan)	2024	50	16	24	10	—	49	36	7	84	RIAA: Gold; MC: Gold	Patterns
"Baggage"	2025	—	42	26	—	—	—	52	27	—	RIAA: Gold	Patterns
"I Sit in Parks"	2025	— (Note: "I Sit in Parks" did not enter the Billboard Hot 100, but peaked at number 18 on the Bubbling Under Hot 100 chart.)	32	—	—	—	—	—	20	—		Mount Pleasant
"Another Drink" (with Marshmello)	2026	60	20	—	—	—	83	—	14	—		Non-album single
"—" denotes a release that did not chart.

=== As featured artist ===
Title	Year	Peak chart positions						Certifications	Album
Title	Year	US	AUS	CAN	NZ	SWE	UK	Certifications	Album
"This Feeling" (The Chainsmokers featuring Kelsea Ballerini)	2018	50	17	34	23	30	63	RIAA: 3× Platinum; ARIA: 2× Platinum; MC: 3× Platinum; BPI: Silver; RMNZ: 2× Platinum	Sick Boy
"If We Never Met" (Note: "If We Never Met" is stylized in all lowercase.) (John K featuring Kelsea Ballerini)	2020	—	—	—	—	—	—	RMNZ: Platinum	Love + Everything Else
"—" denotes a release that did not chart.

=== Promotional singles ===
Title	Year	Peak chart positions			Certifications	Album
Title	Year	US Country	US Country Digital	US Digital	Certifications	Album
"Unapologetically"	2017	32	5	32		Unapologetically
"High School"	2017	28	3	23		Unapologetically
"Better Luck Next Time"	2019	—	3	22	RIAA: Gold; ARIA: Gold; MC: Gold	Non-album single
"Club"	2019	—	11	32		Kelsea
"LA"	2020	—	22	—		Kelsea
"Love Is a Cowboy"	2022	—	—	—		Subject to Change
"The Little Things"	2022	—	—	—		Subject to Change
"What I Have"	2022	—	—	—		Subject to Change
"Sorry Mom"	2024	—	—	—		Patterns
"Two Things"	2024	—	—	—		Patterns
"First Rodeo"	2024	—	—	—		Patterns
"—" denotes a release that did not chart.

== Other charted and certified songs ==
Title	Year	Peak chart positions				Certifications	Album
Title	Year	US Bub.	US Country	US Country Digital	NZ Hot	Certifications	Album
"Center Point Road" (with Thomas Rhett)	2019	—	31	9	—		Center Point Road
"You're Drunk, Go Home" (featuring Kelly Clarkson and Carly Pearce)	2022	—	—	22	—		Subject to Change
"Mountain with a View"	2023	6	27	14	—	RIAA: Gold	Rolling Up the Welcome Mat
"Penthouse"	2023	—	50	—	—	RIAA: Gold	Rolling Up the Welcome Mat
"Interlude" (full length)	2023	—	—	—	38		Rolling Up the Welcome Mat (For Good)
"Emerald City"	2025	—	36	—	34		Mount Pleasant
"—" denotes a release that did not chart.

== Other appearances ==
Title	Year	Artist	Album
"First Time Again"	2016	Jason Aldean	They Don't Know
"Dance With Me"	2018	Morgan Evans	Things That We Drink To
"Better Version"	2022	Fletcher	Girl of My Dreams (Deluxe Edition)
"Math of Us"	2026	Patrick Droney	Non-album single

== Music videos ==
Year	Video	Director	Ref.
2014	"Love Me Like You Mean It" (acoustic)	Robert Chavers	
2015	"Love Me Like You Mean It"	Kristin Barlowe	
2015	"Dibs"	Robert Chavers	
2016	"Peter Pan"	Kristin Barlowe	
2016	"Yeah Boy"	Kristin Barlowe	
2017	"Legends"	Jeff Venable	
2018	"I Hate Love Songs"	Traci Goudie	
2018	"Miss Me More"	David McClister	
2018	"This Feeling" (with The Chainsmokers)	Similar But Different	
2019	"Homecoming Queen?"	Shane Drake	
2019	"Club"		
2019	"LA"		
2020	"Hole in the Bottle"	Hannah Lux Davis	
2020	"Club" (Ballerini album version)	Taylor Kelly	
2021	"Half of My Hometown"	Patrick Tracy	
2021	"I Quit Drinking"	Blythe Thomas	
2022	"Heartfirst"	Patrick Tracy	
2022	"Love is a Cowboy"	Trey Fanjoy	
2022	"What I Have"		
2022	"If You Go Down (I'm Goin' Down Too)"	Patrick Tracy	
2025	"I Sit in Parks"		
