= MTV Video Music Award for Best Country =

American country music award

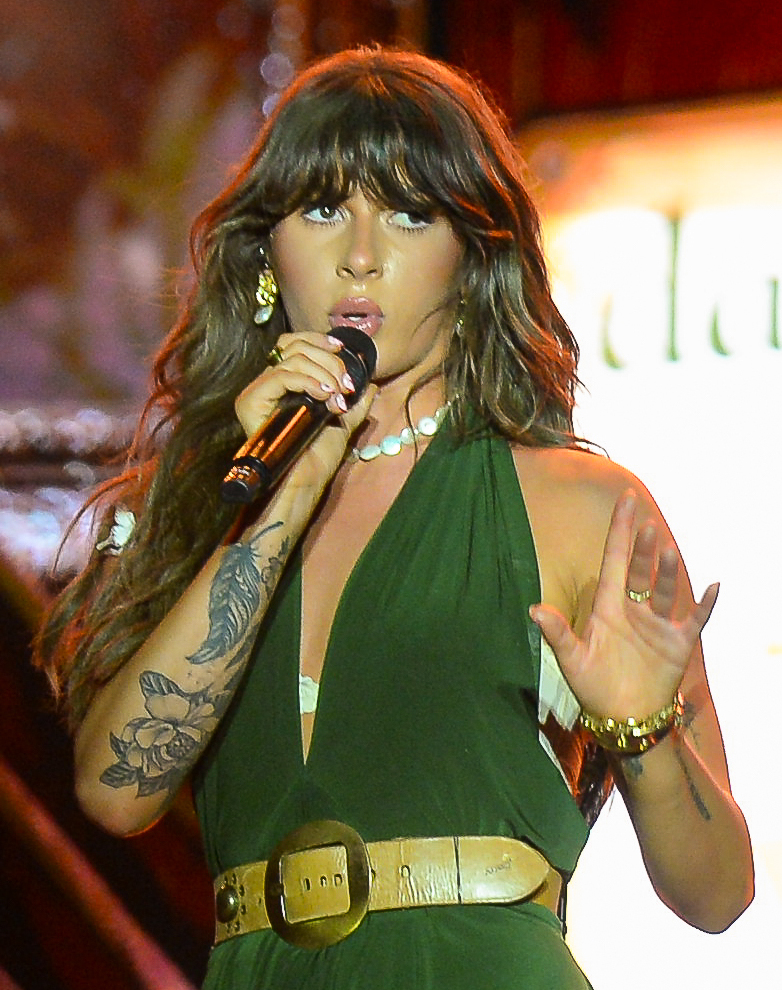
- Ella Langley is the most recent recipient for "Choosin' Texas".
- Country: United States
- Presented by: MTV Networks
- Formerly called: CMT Music Award for Video of the Year
- First award: 2002
- Currently held by: Ella Langley - "Choosin' Texas"

Highlights
- Most wins: Carrie Underwood (10)
- Most nominations: Carrie Underwood (23)

The MTV Video Music Award for Best Country is an award given out at the annual MTV Video Music Awards. The category debuted in 2025 after originally being part of MTV's CMT Music Awards as Video of the Year from 2002 to 2024.

Originally known as the Flameworthy Video of the Year when first awarded in 2002, it was shortened in 2005 to Video of the Year. Following corporate changes at Paramount, the award was moved to the MTV Video Music Awards in 2025, where it is known as Best Country. The award has been fan voted for the entirety of its duration.

Carrie Underwood is the biggest winner in this category, with ten wins, followed by Keith Urban and Taylor Swift, with three wins each. Underwood is also the most nominated artist with twenty-two nominations, followed by Kenny Chesney, Swift and Urban, who have each been nominated eleven times.

== Recipients ==
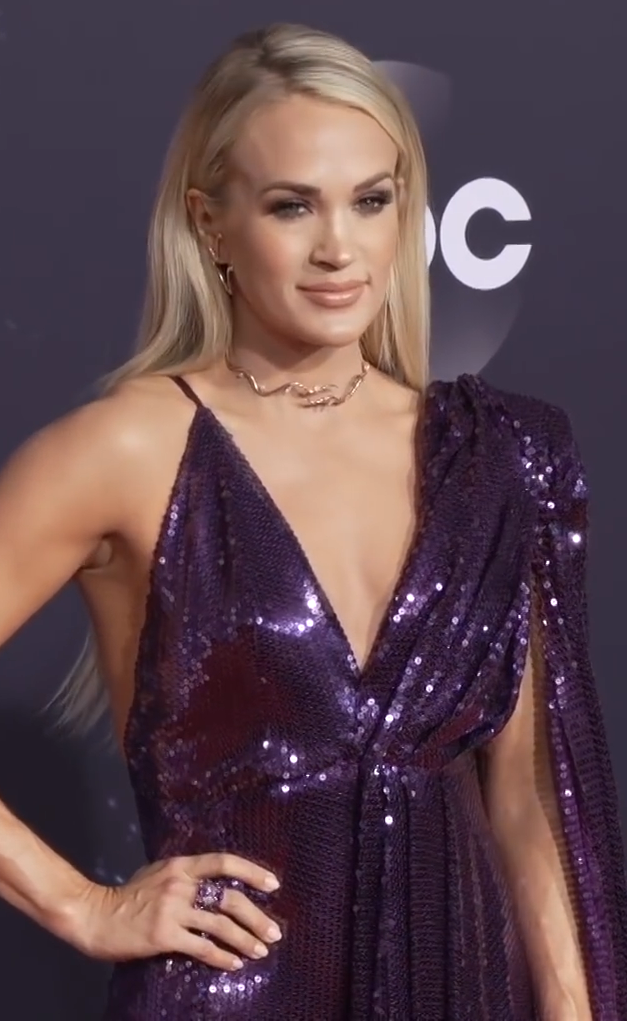
Carrie Underwood is the most decorated artist, winning ten times. She is also the most nominated act in the category, with twenty-three.

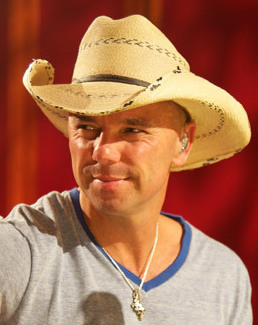
Inaugural winner and eleven-time nominee Kenny Chesney.

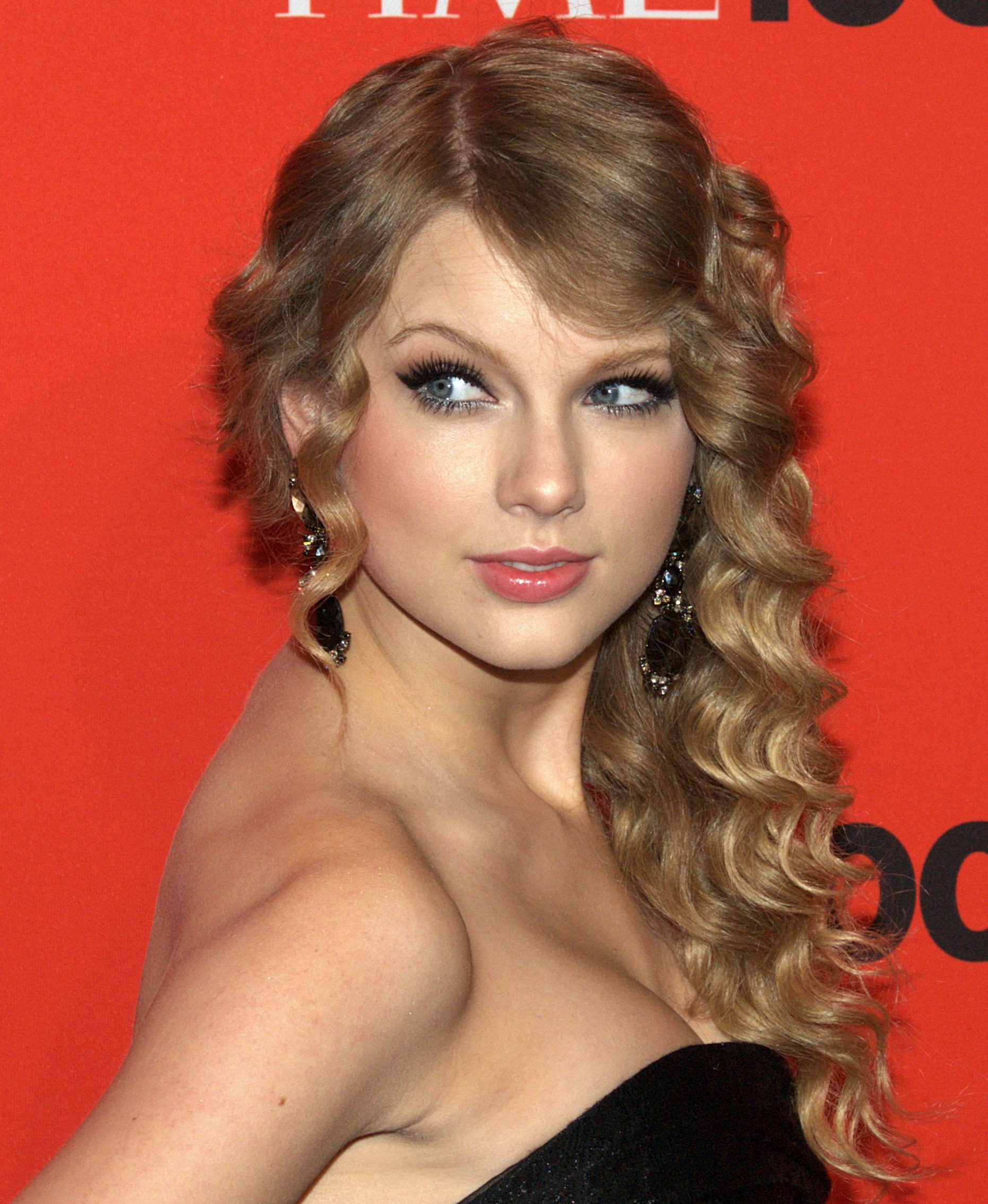
Three-time winner Taylor Swift.

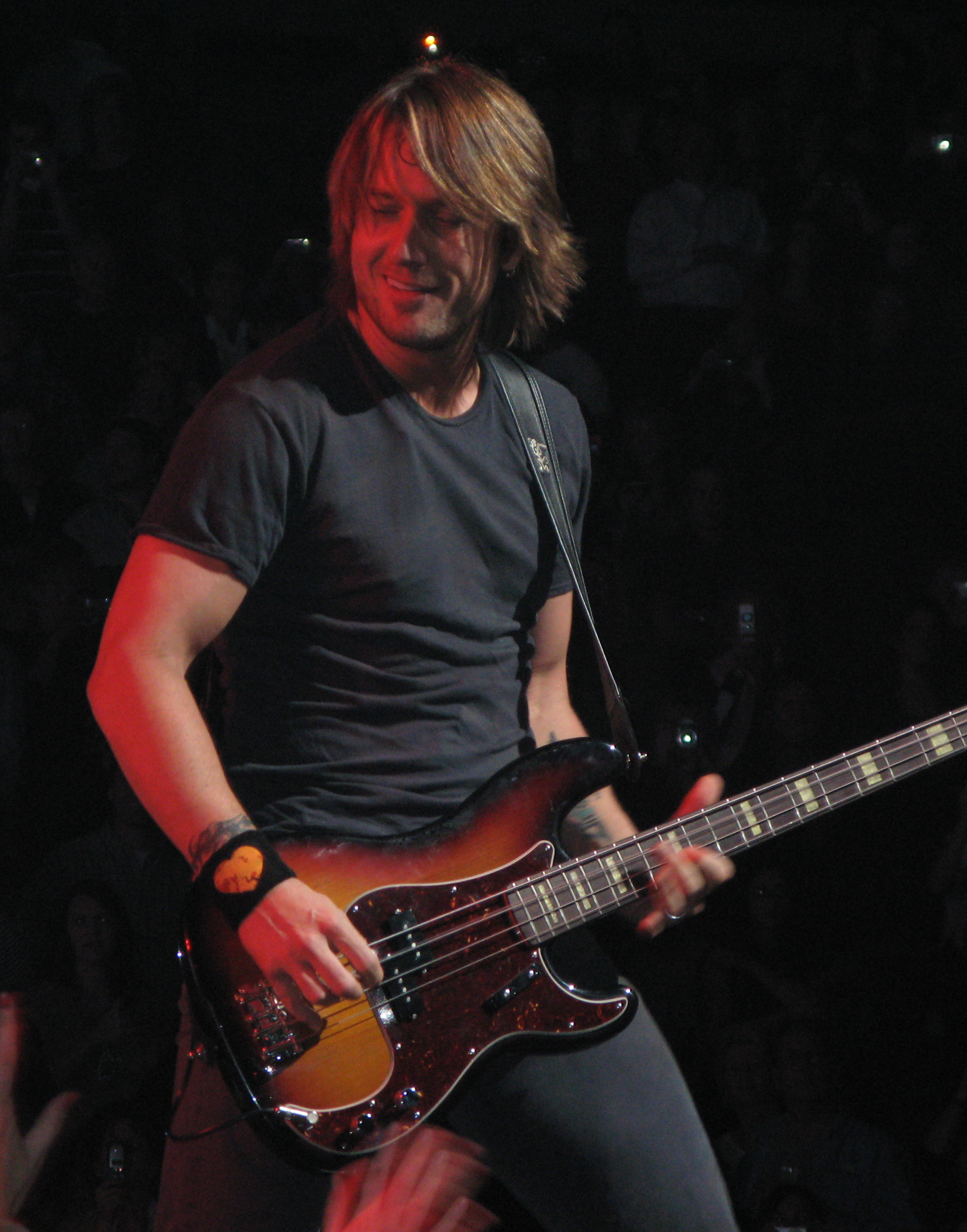
Three-time winner Keith Urban.

Year	Winner		Nominees
Year	Video	Artist(s)	Nominees
CMT Music Awards
2002	"Young"	Kenny Chesney	Brooks & Dunn – "Only in America"; Toby Keith – "I Wanna Talk About Me"; Willie Nelson and Lee Ann Womack – "Mendocino County Line"; Travis Tritt – "Modern Day Bonnie and Clyde"
2003	"Courtesy of the Red, White and Blue (The Angry American)"	Toby Keith	Faith Hill – "Cry"; Tim McGraw – "She's My Kind of Rain"; Kenny Chesney – "The Good Stuff"; Rascal Flatts – "These Days"
2004	"American Soldier"	Toby Keith	Kenny Chesney – "There Goes My Life"; Rascal Flatts – "I Melt"; Keith Urban – "You'll Think of Me"
2005	"Days Go By"	Keith Urban	Big & Rich – "Save A Horse (Ride A Cowboy)"; Brad Paisley and Alison Krauss – "Whiskey Lullaby"; Gretchen Wilson – "Redneck Woman"; Kenny Chesney – "I Go Back"; Rascal Flatts – "Feels Like Today"; Tim McGraw – "Live Like You Were Dying"; Toby Keith – "Stays in Mexico"
2006	"Better Life"	Keith Urban	Trace Adkins – "Honky Tonk Badonkadonk"; Kenny Chesney – "Who You'd Be Today"; Tim McGraw and Faith Hill – "Like We Never Loved at All"; Toby Keith – "As Good as I Once Was"
2007	"Before He Cheats"	Carrie Underwood	Kenny Chesney – "You Save Me"; Toby Keith – "A Little Too Late"; Rascal Flatts – "What Hurts the Most"
2008	"Our Song"	Taylor Swift	Brad Paisley – "Online"; Kenny Chesney – "Don't Blink"; Sugarland – "Stay"
2009	"Love Story"	Taylor Swift	Trace Adkins – "You're Gonna Miss This"; Kenny Chesney and The Wailers – "Everybody Wants to Go to Heaven"; Toby Keith – "God Love Her"; Lady A – "Lookin' for a Good Time"; Brad Paisley – "Waitin' on a Woman"; Rascal Flatts – "Every Day"; Sugarland – "All I Want To Do"; Carrie Underwood – "Just A Dream"
2010	"Cowboy Casanova"	Carrie Underwood	Toby Keith – "American Ride"; Lady A – "Need You Now"; Miranda Lambert – "White Liar"; Taylor Swift – "You Belong With Me"
2011	"Mine"	Taylor Swift	Jason Aldean — "My Kinda Party"; Kenny Chesney — "The Boys of Fall"; Miranda Lambert — "The House That Built Me"; Sugarland — "Stuck Like Glue"
2012	"Good Girl"	Carrie Underwood	Jason Aldean — "Dirt Road Anthem"; Toby Keith — "Red Solo Cup"; Blake Shelton — "God Gave Me You"; Taylor Swift and The Civil Wars — "Safe & Sound"
2013	"Blown Away"	Carrie Underwood	Jason Aldean - "1994"; Luke Bryan - "Kiss Tomorrow Goodbye"; Florida Georgia Line - "Cruise"; Miranda Lambert - "Mama's Broken Heart"; Taylor Swift - "We Are Never Ever Getting Back Together"
2014	"See You Again"	Carrie Underwood	Blake Shelton and Pistol Annies – "Boys ‘Round Here"; Florida Georgia Line and Luke Bryan – "This Is How We Roll"; Luke Bryan – "That's My Kind of Night"; Miranda Lambert – "Automatic"; Tim McGraw, Taylor Swift and Keith Urban – "Highway Don't Care"
2015	"Something in the Water"	Carrie Underwood	Dierks Bentley – "Drunk on a Plane"; Florida Georgia Line – "Dirt"; Jason Aldean – "Burnin' It Down"; Luke Bryan – "Play It Again"; Miranda Lambert and Carrie Underwood – "Somethin' Bad"
2016	"Humble and Kind"	Tim McGraw	Blake Shelton – "Sangria"; Carrie Underwood – "Smoke Break"; Chris Stapleton – "Fire Away"; Luke Bryan – "Strip It Down"; Thomas Rhett – "Die a Happy Man"
2017	"Blue Ain't Your Color"	Keith Urban	Carrie Underwood – "Church Bells"; Artists of Then, Now & Forever – "Forever Country"; Cole Swindell – "Middle of a Memory"; Florida Georgia Line – "H.O.L.Y."; Miranda Lambert – "Vice"; Luke Bryan – "Huntin', Fishin' and Lovin' Every Day"
2018	"I'll Name The Dogs"	Blake Shelton	Brett Young – "Mercy"; Kane Brown and Lauren Alaina – "What Ifs"; Luke Combs – "When It Rains It Pours"; Thomas Rhett – "Marry Me"
2019	"Cry Pretty"	Carrie Underwood	Kane Brown – "Good as You"; Keith Urban and Julia Michaels – "Coming Home"; Kelsea Ballerini – "Miss Me More"; Luke Combs – "She Got the Best of Me"
2020	"Drinking Alone"	Carrie Underwood	Keith Urban — "Polaroid"; Kelsea Ballerini — "homecoming queen?"; Luke Combs — "Beer Never Broke My Heart"; Miranda Lambert — "Bluebird"; Tanya Tucker — "Bring My Flowers Now"
2021	"Hallelujah"	Carrie Underwood; John Legend	Kane Brown – "Worldwide Beautiful"; Keith Urban and Pink – "One Too Many"; Kelsea Ballerini – "Hole in the Bottle"
2022	"If I Didn't Love You"	Jason Aldean; Carrie Underwood	Cody Johnson — "'Til You Can't"; Cole Swindell and Lainey Wilson — "Never Say Never"; Kane Brown — "One Mississippi"; Kelsea Ballerini and Kenny Chesney — "Half of My Hometown"; Luke Combs — "Forever After All"
2023	"Thank God"	Kane Brown; Katelyn Brown	Blake Shelton — "No Body"; Carrie Underwood — "Hate My Heart"; Cody Johnson — "Human"; Hardy feat. Lainey Wilson — "Wait in the Truck"; Morgan Wallen — "You Proof"
2024	"Need a Favor"	Jelly Roll	Cody Johnson - "The Painter"; Jelly Roll - "Need a Favor"; Kelsea Ballerini - "If You Go Down (I'm Goin' Down Too)"
MTV Video Music Awards
2025	"Am I Okay?"	Megan Moroney	Chris Stapleton – "Think I'm in Love with You"; Cody Johnson and Carrie Underwood – "I'm Gonna Love You"; Jelly Roll – "Liar"; Morgan Wallen – "Smile"; Lainey Wilson – "4x4xU"
2026	"Choosin' Texas"	Ella Langley	Kacey Musgraves – "Dry Spell"; Lainey Wilson – "Somewhere Over Laredo"; Luke Combs – "Back in the Saddle"; Shaboozey – "Cowgirl"; Stella Lefty – "Boston"; Tucker Wetmore – "Brunette"
