= Club (song) =

Promotional single by Kelsea Ballerini

from the album Kelsea
- Released: November 8, 2019
- Length: 3:01
- Label: Black River
- Songwriters: Jimmy Robbins; Kelsea Ballerini; Nicolle Galyon
- Producers: Jimmy Robbins; Kelsea Ballerini

Kelsea Ballerini promotional singles chronology
"Better Luck Next Time" (2019)	"Club" (2019)	"LA" (2020)

Music video
- "Club" on YouTube

"Club" (stylized in all lowercase) is a song by American singer and songwriter Kelsea Ballerini. It was released through Black River Entertainment on November 8, 2019, as the first promotional single from Ballerini's third studio album, Kelsea. She co-wrote the song with Jimmy Robbins and Nicolle Galyon, co-producing it with Robbins.

With the elements of country, electronic, acoustic, and pop music, "Club" is a mid-tempo song whose lyrics explore introversion and Ballerini's reluctance to participate in nightlife despite social expectations. It was promoted with a music video and a performance at the 2019 People's Choice Awards, and was later re-recorded for Ballerini's 2020 companion album, Ballerini.

== Background and release ==
After releasing "Homecoming Queen?", the lead single of her third studio album, Kelsea, Ballerini revealed a cover art of "Club" that features Polaroid photographs of her and her friends scattered across a table with confetti and shoes. The song was released on November 8, 2019, to digital and streaming through Black River Entertainment. A stripped-down re-recording of "Club" was released on September 2, 2020, as the lead preview of Ballerini (2020), Ballerini's companion album to Kelsea featuring reimagined versions of the same songs.

== Composition ==
Ballerini wrote "Club" with Jimmy Robbins and Nicolle Galyon, and co-produced the track with Robbins. Ballerini contributed lead vocals. Robbins and Nir Z handled recording engineering and digital editing. Dan Grech-Marguerat provided additional programming and mixing engineering. Charles Haydon Hicks and Luke Burgoyne were responsible for mixing and second engineering. The song was mastered by Dave Kutch, with production coordination by Mike "Frog" Griffith.

A mid-tempo song, "Club" combines country, electronic, and acoustic instrumentation with pop production. Its lyrics continue the introspective tone of "Homecoming Queen?", as Ballerini reflects on introversion and her reluctance to participate in nightlife despite feeling expected to do so. Jon Freeman of Rolling Stone noted that the song's percussion-driven chorus emphasizes its central message.

== Music video ==
The accompanying music video, released on November 10, 2019, depicts Ballerini and a group of her friends spending the evening in a hotel room, where they drink, sing karaoke, and dance beneath a disco ball before ending the night with a fully clothed swim in an outdoor pool, rather than going to a nightclub. It was directed by Blythe Thomas and exclusively premiered through E!.

== Live performance ==
After teasing the performance via her Twitter, Ballerini gave the first televised performance of "Club" at the 2019 People's Choice Awards on November 10. Wearing a pink dress and accompanied by four dancers, she performed the song on a disco-themed stage featuring mirrored balls and animated visual backdrops.

== Critical reception ==
iHeartRadio's Blake Taylor described "Club" as a "catchy" track, noting that, unlike many party-oriented songs, it focuses on Ballerini's reluctance to participate in club culture.

== Personnel ==
Credits were adapted from Tidal.

- Kelsea Ballerini – lead vocals, producer, songwriter
- Jimmy Robbins – producer, songwriter, recording engineering, digital editing
- Nicolle Galyon – songwriter
- Dan Grech-Marguerat – additional programming, mixing engineering
- Nir Z – recording engineering, digital editing
- Charles Haydon Hicks – mixing, second engineering
- Luke Burgoyne – mixing, second engineering
- Dave Kutch – mastering
- Mike "Frog" Griffith – production coordination

== Release history ==
Release dates and formats
Region	Date	Format(s)	Label	Ref.
Various	November 8, 2019	Digital download; streaming	Black River	
