= LA (Kelsea Ballerini song) =

Promotional single by Kelsea Ballerini

from the album Kelsea
- Released: January 24, 2020
- Genre: Country pop
- Length: 2:47
- Label: Black River
- Songwriter: Kelsea Ballerini
- Producers: Jimmy Robbins; Kelsea Ballerini

Kelsea Ballerini promotional singles chronology
"Club" (2019)	"LA" (2020)	"Love Is a Cowboy" (2022)

Music video
- "LA" on YouTube

"LA" (acronym for "Los Angeles"; stylized in all lowercase) is a song by American singer and songwriter Kelsea Ballerini. It was released through Black River Entertainment on January 24, 2020, as the second promotional single from Ballerini's third studio album, Kelsea. She solely wrote the song and co-produced it with Jimmy Robbins.

A mid-tempo song with pop-country sounds, "LA" explores Ballerini's conflicted relationship with Los Angeles, contrasting the city's glamour with the pressures of fame and life in the music industry. The song was accompanied by a music video filmed across Los Angeles and was promoted with a performance on Jimmy Kimmel Live!.

== Background and release ==
Ballerini wrote "LA" by herself while sitting on the bathroom floor of a house in Los Angeles after leaving her guitar on her tour bus. She explained that the lyrics began as a stream-of-consciousness poem inspired by feeling "equal parts like somebody and like nobody" and added that the song reflected both her admiration for and anxiety about the city. Describing it as "the most vulnerable thing I've publicly shared", Ballerini said she was "really proud of every word of it".

Ahead of announcing her third studio album, Kelsea, Ballerini revealed that "LA" would be released on January 24, 2020, as the third song issued from the album, following "Homecoming Queen?" and "Club". "LA" was released to digital and streaming through Black River Entertainment.

== Composition ==
Ballerini wrote "LA" and co-produced the track with Jimmy Robbins. She contributed lead vocals, while Robbins handled recording engineering. Dan Grech-Marguerat provided additional programming and mixing engineering. Charles Haydon Hicks and Luke Burgoyne were responsible for mixing and second engineering. The song was mastered by Dave Kutch, with production coordination by Mike "Frog" Griffith.

"LA" is a mid-tempo track that features pop-country sounds. Ballerini reflects on her conflicted relationship with Los Angeles, contrasting the city's glamour with the pressures of fame and the realities of pursuing a career in the music industry while away from her hometown of Nashville. Jacklyn Krol of Taste of Country characterized the track as a "love/hate letter" to the city.

== Music video and live performance ==
The accompanying music video was released alongside the song on January 24, 2020. It features Ballerini exploring various locations across Los Angeles while performing the song. On February 6, Ballerini performed "LA" alongside "Homecoming Queen?" on Jimmy Kimmel Live! ahead of the release of Kelsea.

== Personnel ==
Credits were adapted from Tidal.

- Kelsea Ballerini – lead vocals, producer, songwriter
- Jimmy Robbins – producer, recording engineering
- Dan Grech-Marguerat – additional programming, mixing engineering
- Charles Haydon Hicks – mixing, second engineering
- Luke Burgoyne – mixing, second engineering
- Dave Kutch – mastering
- Mike "Frog" Griffith – production coordination

== Release history ==
Release dates and formats
Region	Date	Format(s)	Label	Ref.
Various	January 24, 2020	Digital download; streaming	Black River	
