= Ballerini =

Ballerini is an Italian surname. Notable people with the surname include:

- Andrea Ballerini (born 1973), Italian motorcycle racer
- Antonio Ballerini (1805–1881), Italian Jesuit theologian
- Augusto Ballerini (18578-1902), Argentine painter
- Davide Ballerini (born 1994), Italian cyclist
- Edoardo Ballerini (born 1970), American actor
- Franco Ballerini (1964–2010), Italian cyclist
- Kelsea Ballerini (born 1993), American country pop singer-songwriter
- Luigi Ballerini (born 1940), Italian poet
- Paolo Angelo Ballerini (1814–1897), Italian Roman Catholic archbishop
- Girolamo and Pietro Ballerini, Italian Catholic theologians and canonists

== See also ==
- Ballerini (album), 2020 Kelsea Ballerini album
- Ballarini
