= Better Luck Next Time (Kelsea Ballerini song) =

Promotional single by Kelsea Ballerini
- Released: June 11, 2019
- Genre: Acoustic; R&B; pop
- Length: 2:52
- Label: Black River
- Songwriters: Andrew DeRoberts; Darius Coleman; Ester Dean; Kelsea Ballerini; Ryan Tedder; Shane McAnally; Taylor Sparks
- Producers: Andrew DeRoberts; Ryan Tedder

Kelsea Ballerini promotional singles chronology
"High School" (2017)	"Better Luck Next Time" (2019)	"Club" (2019)

"Better Luck Next Time" is a song by American singer and songwriter Kelsea Ballerini. It was released through Black River Entertainment on June 11, 2019, as a promotional single after she selected the song while appearing as the featured recording artist on NBC's Songland. Ballerini co-wrote the song with Andrew DeRoberts, Darius Coleman, Ester Dean, Ryan Tedder, Shane McAnally, and Taylor Sparks, while DeRoberts and Tedder produced it.

An acoustic and R&B-influenced pop ballad about overcoming infidelity, "Better Luck Next Time" marked a stylistic departure from Ballerini's previous work. It reached the top 10 of the iTunes chart and peaked at numbers 22 and 3 on the US Digital Song Sales and Country Digital charts, respectively.

== Background and release ==
Ballerini appeared as the featured recording artist on an episode of NBC's Songland, where she said she hoped the program would give viewers a better understanding of the songwriting process and encourage greater appreciation for popular music. She explained that she was looking for a song that would challenge her artistically as she continued to "evolv[e]" her sound and style. After hearing Darius Coleman's "Better Luck Next Time", Ballerini selected it because its melody felt "challenging", "interesting", and "intricate", later saying that she wanted Coleman to attend the recording session to help her recreate his vocal runs and riffs.

Ballerini recorded "Better Luck Next Time" after appearing as a guest artist on Songland. The song, originally presented by Coleman, was released on June 11, 2019, to digital and streaming through Black River Entertainment. Upon release, it reached the top 10 on the iTunes chart, as well as peaked at number 22 on the US Digital Song Sales and number 3 on the US US Country Digital chart.

== Composition ==
Ballerini wrote "Better Luck Next Time" with Andrew DeRoberts, Coleman, Ester Dean, Ryan Tedder, Shane McAnally, and Taylor Sparks. The track was produced by DeRoberts and Tedder, while Ballerini provided lead vocals.

About overcoming the aftermath of infidelity, "Better Luck Next Time" is an acoustic guitar ballad rooted in R&B and pop sounds; Rania Aniftos of Billboard described it as an "uncharacteristically yet refreshing" departure from Ballerini's usual sound.

== Personnel ==
Credits were adapted from Tidal.

- Kelsea Ballerini – lead vocals, songwriter
- Andrew DeRoberts – producer, songwriter
- Ryan Tedder – producer, songwriter
- Darius Coleman – songwriter
- Ester Dean – songwriter
- Shane McAnally – songwriter
- Taylor Sparks – songwriter

== Charts ==
Chart performance
Chart (2019)	Peak position
US Digital Song Sales (Billboard)	22

== Certifications ==
Certifications and sales
Region	Certification	Certified units/sales
Australia (ARIA)	Gold	35,000^{‡}
Canada (Music Canada)	Gold	40,000^{‡}
United States (RIAA)	Gold	500,000^{‡}
^{‡} Sales+streaming figures based on certification alone.

== Release history ==
Release dates and formats
Region	Date	Format(s)	Label	Ref.
Various	June 11, 2019	Digital download; streaming	Black River	
