= Unapologetically =

- Standard cover

Studio album by Kelsea Ballerini
- Released: November 3, 2017
- Length: 41:31
- Label: Black River
- Producers: Jason Massey; Forest Glen Whitehead; Jimmy Robbins; The Chainsmokers

Kelsea Ballerini chronology
The First Time (2015)	Unapologetically (2017)	Kelsea (2020)

Singles from Unapologetically
- 1. "Legends" Released: June 7, 2017; 2. "I Hate Love Songs" Released: March 12, 2018; 3. "Miss Me More" Released: October 15, 2018

Unapologetically is the second studio album by American singer Kelsea Ballerini. It was released on November 3, 2017, through Black River Entertainment. Reaching the top 10 on the US Billboard 200 and Top Country Albums chart, the album was nominated for Best Country Album in 2019 Grammy Awards.

== Background and development ==
After moving to Nashville at the age of 15, Ballerini continued writing songs and later signed a publishing deal with Black River Entertainment at 19. Following the success of her debut album The First Time (2015), which produced the chart-topping singles "Love Me Like You Mean It" and "Dibs", Ballerini began working on her second studio album. She stated that the project would aim to reflect her growth both as an artist and as an individual, while signaling a new creative direction.

Expected to feature collaborations with songwriters such as Hillary Lindsey, Shane McAnally, Ross Copperman, Josh Osborne, and Luke Laird, the record would continue her collaboration with producer Forest Glen Whitehead, according to Ballerini. She described the project as her "first intentional album", noting that she took a more active role in its writing and production compared to her previous work.

== Composition ==
Unapologetically traces the course of Ballerini's love life, which Gayle Thompson of The Boot described as a "12-track journey" from heartbreak to "happily-ever-after" with the singer's husband, Morgan Evans. Discussing the album's writing process, Ballerini said she aimed to maintain consistency between her personal life and artistic identity, writing songs that were "very open and honest". She had also stated that the record would remain rooted in country music, despite incorporating pop-leaning material.

In an interview with Variety, she emphasized her openness to blending genres, citing influences from pop, rap, and rock music, while maintaining a foundation in songwriting and her Southern upbringing, adding that the album exists "on that line" between country and pop. While preparing the album, she said it would reflect the previous two years of her life, including a breakup and personal growth, as well as a new relationship with Evans. Unapologetically was also described by her as a "labor of love", exploring themes that range from heartbreak and loss to new romance and enduring relationships.

== Promotion ==
During a Good Morning America performance on July 25, 2017, Ballerini announced the title and release date of Unapologetically. In August, the album's track listing was first revealed to her fans during a four-day check-in event over the mobile app Swarm. The album's deluxe edition with four new bonus tracks, including a cover version of "Landslide" by Fleetwood Mac and duet with the Chainsmokers, was released on October 26, 2018.

Teasing the lead single of Unapologetically, "Legends", on May 29, 2017, Ballerini premiered the track at The Bobby Bones Show on June 7. It was released digitally on the same day, sent to country radio station on July 10. The song became Ballerini's fourth number one hit on the Billboard's Country Airplay chart for the week dated February 24, 2018. The title track "Unapologetically" was released as the first promotional single on August 11, the day when the album became available for pre-order on Amazon and iTunes. Ballerini premiered an acoustic version of the track at USA Today on November 2 and at Radio Disney Country in 2018. The album's second promotional single, "High School", written by herself, was released on September 22. "Miss Me More" served as the album's final promotional single on October 20. "I Hate Love Songs" was released on March 12, 2018, as the album's second single. It reached a peak of number 25 on the Billboard Country Airplay chart. "Miss Me More" was released as the third single from the album on October 15. It reached a peak of number 2 on the Billboard Country Airplay chart.

In October 2017, Ballerini announced the Unapologetically Tour, describing it as a continuation of a "new chapter" in her career. It began on February 8, 2018 at Alabama Theatre in Birmingham and concluded on April 27 at Stagecoach Festival. American singers Walker Hayes and Bailey Bryan were announced that they would join in the tour; the former was a supporting act, while the latter participated in her Ryman Auditorium on Valentine's Day concert.

== Critical reception ==
Professional ratings
Aggregate scores
Source	Rating
AnyDecentMusic?	6.3/10
Metacritic	74/100
Review scores
Source	Rating
AllMusic	3.5/5 stars
Digital Journal	A
Evening Standard	3/5 stars
The New York Times	70/100 (Note: Although The New York Times did not explicitly score the album, Metacritic marks their score as 70 out of 100.)
Rolling Stone	3.5/5 stars
Paste	8.1/10

At review aggregation website Metacritic, Unapologetically has a weighted average score of 74 out of 100, based on 4 reviews, indicating "generally favorable reviews".

Paste writer Robert Ham spoke about Unapologetically, "it's more country by reputation—and the artful twang in Ballerini’s voice—than in sound. But within the album, the songs eschew lovesick notions and bitter revenge fantasies", noting that, "Unapologetically gains in strength as it goes along, mirroring Ballerini’s push away from a particular lover and towards the welcoming arms of a new beau." Billboard contributor Chuck Dauphin placed two songs from the album on his top 10 list of Ballerini's best songs: "Legends" at number three and the title track at number four. Writing for Vulture, Frank Guan noted that Unapologetically leaves listeners "more confident in her presence and artistry than ever before", while suggesting that broader mainstream recognition may depend on her ability to further develop her artistic identity.

=== Accolades ===
Year	Award	Category	Result	Ref.
2019	Grammy Award	Best Country Album	Nominated	

== Commercial performance ==
Unapologetically debuted at number seven on the US Billboard 200 with 44,000 album-equivalent units, including 35,000 pure album sales. It remained her highest charting album until her fifth studio album Patterns (2024). Unapologetically has sold 156,700 copies in the United States as of October 2019.

== Track listing ==
All tracks are written by Kelsea Ballerini, with additional co-writers as noted, except "Landslide" (written by Stevie Nicks) and "This Feeling" (written by Alexander Pall, Andrew Taggart and Emily Warren).

Standard edition
No.	Title	Writer(s)	Length
1.	"Graveyard"	Shane McAnally; Forest Glen Whitehead	3:46
2.	"Miss Me More"	David Hodges; Brett McLaughlin	3:12
3.	"Get Over Yourself"	McAnally; Ross Copperman	3:20
4.	"Roses"	Zach Crowell; Ashley Gorley	2:57
5.	"Machine Heart"	James Abrahart; Greg Wells	3:09
6.	"In Between"	McAnally; Jimmy Robbins	3:29
7.	"High School"		3:55
8.	"End of the World"	Hillary Lindsey; Lindsay Rimes	3:28
9.	"I Hate Love Songs"	McAnally; Trevor Rosen	3:11
10.	"Unapologetically"	Lindsey; Whitehead	3:38
11.	"Music"	Robbins; Jennifer Denmark; Nicolle Galyon	3:23
12.	"Legends"	Lindsey; Whitehead	4:03
Total length:			41:31

Deluxe edition
No.	Title	Writer(s)	Length
13.	"Fun and Games"	McAnally; Whitehead	3:00
14.	"I Think I Fell in Love Today"		2:32
15.	"Landslide" (live from Nashville) (Fleetwood Mac cover)		3:17
16.	"This Feeling" (The Chainsmokers featuring Kelsea Ballerini)		3:17
Total length:			53:37

== Personnel ==
Adapted from AllMusic.

- Kelsea Ballerini - lead vocals
- Ross Copperman – drum programming
- Zach Crowell – acoustic guitar
- Jennifer Denmark – background vocals
- Kris Donegan – acoustic guitar, electric guitar
- David Dorn – keyboards, organ, piano, synthesizer, synthesizer strings
- Fred Eltringham – drums
- Nicolle Galyon – background vocals
- Lee Hendricks – bass guitar
- David Hodges – acoustic guitar
- Evan Hutchings – drums
- Hillary Lindsey – background vocals
- Jason Massey – brass arrangements, drum programming, drums, acoustic guitar, electric guitar, mandolin, organ, string arrangements, background vocals
- Rob McNelley – acoustic guitar, electric guitar
- Lindsey Rimes – bass guitar, acoustic guitar, electric guitar, keyboards, drum programming, string arrangements, background vocals
- Jimmy Robbins – acoustic guitar, piano, drum programming
- Adam Shoenfeld – electric guitar
- Derek Wells – electric guitar, steel guitar
- Forest Glen Whitehead – bass guitar, acoustic guitar, electric guitar, keyboards, mandolin, background vocals
- Nir Z. – drums

== Charts ==
=== Weekly charts ===
Chart (2017)	Peak position
Australian Albums (ARIA)	12
Australian Country Albums (ARIA)	1
Canadian Albums (Billboard)	18
New Zealand Heatseeker Albums (RMNZ)	5
Scottish Albums (Official Charts)	24
UK Albums (Official Charts)	50
UK Country Albums (Official Charts)	1
US Billboard 200	7
US Top Country Albums (Billboard)	3
US Independent Albums (Billboard)	2

=== Year-end charts ===
Chart (2017)	Position
US Top Country Albums (Billboard)	87
US Independent Albums (Billboard)	44
Chart (2018)	Position
US Top Country Albums (Billboard)	38
US Independent Albums (Billboard)	16

== Certifications ==
List of certifications and sales
Region	Certification	Certified units/sales
Canada (Music Canada)	Platinum	80,000^{‡}
United States (RIAA)	Gold	500,000^{‡}
^{‡} Sales+streaming figures based on certification alone.
