= Rolling Up the Welcome Mat =

EP by Kelsea Ballerini
- Released: February 14, 2023
- Recorded: 2022
- Genre: Country
- Length: 15:54
- Label: Black River
- Producer: Kelsea Ballerini; Alysa Vanderheym

Kelsea Ballerini chronology
Subject to Change (2022)	Rolling Up the Welcome Mat (2023)	Patterns (2024)

Singles from Rolling Up the Welcome Mat
- 1. "Blindsided" Released: March 13, 2023

Rolling Up the Welcome Mat is the second extended play (EP) by American singer Kelsea Ballerini. It was released on February 14, 2023, by Black River Entertainment. Accompanied by a short film of the same name, the project was nominated for Album of the Year at the 57th Annual CMA Awards and Best Country Album at the 66th Annual Grammy Awards.

On August 1, 2023, Ballerini announced that she was releasing an extended version of the EP titled Rolling Up the Welcome Mat (For Good) on August 11, 2023.

== Background ==
In March 2016, Ballerini began dating Australian country singer Morgan Evans, and the two were married in 2017. On August 29, 2022, Ballerini announced that she and Evans were divorcing. On November 3, 2022, it was revealed that Ballerini and Evans had reached a settlement agreement and their divorce was finalized on November 15, 2022.

On February 13, 2023, Ballerini announced through her social media that she would be releasing Rolling Up the Welcome Mat as a surprise release that night, coinciding with Valentine's Day. It was described by the singer on her social media:

"I was writing by myself for most of the project, and it was nice to trust myself again," Ballerini writes. "Ironically, I started writing music because my parents got divorced; that was my therapy. Rolling Up The Welcome Mat was how I processed everything. It's the way I got my feelings out of my body and heart and put them to music, which is the purest way I could've handled it."

— Ballerini on Rolling Up the Welcome Mat (For Good)

== Reception and controversy ==
Professional ratings
Review scores
Source	Rating
AllMusic	3.5/5 stars

Chris Willman of Variety found the choice of making an album about her divorce "unexpectedly savvy" as a "parcel all that pain into a dam-burster of a side project with no commercial expectations, no press and no holds barred". Willman wrote that even if it was a "volume of historical annotation", the songs did not "always feel so strictly autobiographical that they lack for cleverness", with "very little [that] sounds singularly country genre".

Stephen Thomas Erlewine of AllMusic described the lyrics as "a number of intimate details of their union, along with a rolling series of self-insights" not finding them, however, "intense". Erlewine wrote that the album "offers clean, uncluttered comfort" not in line with his conception in "a place of pain", as her divorce was.

The album was named the 98th best album of 2023 by Rolling Stone, prizing the "clear narrative" of the tracks, producing a "succinct post-divorce diary, leveling up her songwriting in the process on brutal confessionals".

The extended play was brought to attention because fans used the pause in the song "Penthouse" as a cue to taunt her ex-husband, Morgan Evans. This chant was heard on multiple Patterns Tour concerts in early 2025, and it was even heard on Rolling Up the Welcome Mat (for good). Following these behaviors, Ballerini called out the crowd to stop it, stating, "We're three years past it, everything's fine now".

=== Year-end rankings ===
Publication	List	Rank	Ref.
Billboard	The 50 Best Albums of 2023	19	
Rolling Stone	The 100 Best Albums of 2023	98	

== Film ==
The release of the EP was accompanied by a 20-minute short film acting as a visual album for the EP, written by Ballerini and co-directed by Patrick Tracy. The film portrays a woman, played by Ballerini, going through the stages of grief and acceptance to the end of a marriage and an impending divorce.

== Promotion ==
On March 4, 2023, Ballerini sang "Blindsided" and "Penthouse" on Saturday Night Live. Two years later, "Penthouse" was upgraded as a duet collaboration on The Voice season 27 by Ballerini and Angie Rey, a contestant in the blind auditions who had idolized her after Rey had hit notes that Kelsea did not for which only Ballerini had turned her chair.

== Track listing ==
Rolling Up the Welcome Mat track listing
No.	Title	Writer(s)	Length
1.	"Mountain with a View"	Kelsea Ballerini	2:57
2.	"Just Married"	Ballerini	3:18
3.	"Penthouse"	Ballerini; Alysa Vanderheym	3:03
4.	"Interlude"	Ballerini; Vanderheym	0:45
5.	"Blindsided"	Ballerini; Vanderheym	2:50
6.	"Leave Me Again"	Ballerini	2:58
Total length:			15:54

Rolling Up the Welcome Mat (For Good) track listing
No.	Title	Writer(s)	Length
1.	"Mountain with a View"	Kelsea Ballerini	2:57
2.	"Just Married"	Ballerini	3:18
3.	"Penthouse (Healed Version) [Live]"	Ballerini; Alysa Vanderheym	4:20
4.	"Interlude (Full Length)"	Ballerini; Vanderheym	2:19
5.	"Blindsided (Yeah, Sure, Okay)"	Ballerini; Vanderheym	2:47
6.	"Leave Me Again"	Ballerini	2:58
7.	"How Do I Do This"	Ballerini; Vanderheym	2:51
Total length:			21:30

== Personnel ==
- Kelsea Ballerini – lead vocals, production (all tracks), background vocals (tracks 1–5)
- Alysa Vanderheym – production, digital editing, (all tracks), programming (1–5), background vocals (1, 5), engineering (4, 6)
- Andrew Mendelson – mastering
- Dan Grech-Marguerat – mixing
- Mike Stankiewicz – engineering (1–3, 5)
- Zach Kuhlman – engineering assistance (1–3, 5)
- Andrew Darby – mastering assistance
- Jacob Friga – mastering assistance
- Luke Armentrout – mastering assistance
- Taylor Chadwick – mastering assistance
- Charles Haydon Hicks – mixing assistance
- Luke Burgoyne – mixing assistance

== Charts ==
=== Weekly charts ===
Weekly chart performance for Rolling Up the Welcome Mat
Chart (2023)	Peak position
Australian Country Albums (ARIA)	8
Australian Digital Albums (ARIA)	5
Canadian Albums (Billboard)	96
UK Album Downloads (OCC)	35
US Billboard 200	48
US Independent Albums (Billboard)	5
US Top Country Albums (Billboard)	11

=== Year-end charts ===
Year-end chart performance for Rolling Up the Welcome Mat
Chart (2023)	Position
US Top Country Albums (Billboard)	56
