= Kelsea =

Studio album by Kelsea Ballerini
- Released: March 20, 2020
- Studios: Sound Stage (Nashville); The Robbins Nest (Nashville); Z (Nashville); The Red Room (Nashville); Southern Ground (Nashville); Spirit Music Nashville (Nashville); The Brown Owl (Nashville)
- Genres: Pop; country
- Length: 39:36
- Label: Black River
- Producers: Kelsea Ballerini; Jesse Frasure; Jimmy Robbins; Ross Copperman; Shane McAnally

Kelsea Ballerini chronology
Unapologetically (2017)	Kelsea (2020)	Ballerini (2020)

Singles from Kelsea
- 1. "Homecoming Queen?" Released: September 6, 2019; 2. "The Other Girl" Released: April 20, 2020; 3. "Hole in the Bottle" Released: May 27, 2020; 4. "Half of My Hometown" Released: April 19, 2021

Professional ratings
Review scores
Source	Rating
AllMusic	3.5/5 stars
The Independent	4/5 stars
Rolling Stone	3.5/5 stars
Spectrum Culture	3.25/5
The Times	4/5 stars

Kelsea (stylized in all lowercase) is the third studio album by American singer and songwriter Kelsea Ballerini. The album was released on March 20, 2020. Kelsea debuted at numbers 2 and 12 on the Top Country Albums and Billboard 200 charts, respectively. It spawned four official singles "Homecoming Queen?", "The Other Girl", "Hole in the Bottle", and "Half of My Hometown" as well as two promotional singles "Club" and "LA".

== Background ==
Ballerini announced via Instagram in July 2019 that her third album was complete. The album title and its release date were revealed on January 20, 2020. The album's track list was revealed on February 27, 2020.

Ballerini wrote or co-wrote all 13 tracks on the album. Two tracks have credited guest vocalists: "The Other Girl" is a duet with Halsey and "Half of My Hometown" features harmony vocals from Kenny Chesney.

== Singles ==
The lead single of the album was "Homecoming Queen?" which was released on September 6, 2019. Ballerini sang it at the 53rd Annual Country Music Association Awards in November. "The Other Girl," featuring Halsey, was released on April 20, 2020, as the album's second single.

On February 28, 2020, "Hole in the Bottle" was released as a promotional single but was later made an official single on May 27, 2020. A remix featuring Canadian singer Shania Twain was released November 13, 2020. "Half of My Hometown," featuring Kenny Chesney, was released on April 19, 2021, as the album's fourth single.

=== Promotional singles ===
"Club" was released on November 8, 2019, as the album's first promotional single. A music video was released two days later, on November 10, 2019. "LA", the album's second promotional single, was released on January 24, 2020.

== Track listing ==
All tracks are written by Kelsea Ballerini, with additional co-writers as noted.

No.	Title	Writer(s)	Length
1.	"Overshare"	Jesse Frasure; Josh Osborne; Tayla Parx	2:50
2.	"Club"	Nicolle Galyon; Jimmy Robbins	3:01
3.	"Homecoming Queen?"	Galyon; Robbins	2:48
4.	"The Other Girl" (with Halsey)	Ross Copperman; Shane McAnally; Ashley Frangipane	3:21
5.	"Love Me Like a Girl"	Copperman; Lauren Grieve; Hillary Lindsey; Jordan Minton	2:57
6.	"Love and Hate"	Copperman; Ed Sheeran	2:58
7.	"Bragger"	Copperman; Galyon; McAnally; Robbins	2:46
8.	"Hole in the Bottle"	Frasure; Lindsey; Ashley Gorley; Steph Jones	2:36
9.	"Half of My Hometown" (featuring Kenny Chesney)	Copperman; Galyon; McAnally; Robbins	3:52
10.	"The Way I Used To"	Jones; Julian Bunetta; Ian Kirkpatrick; Samuel George Lewis; Marcus Lomax; Cass Lowe	3:15
11.	"Needy"	Copperman; Julia Michaels	3:12
12.	"A Country Song"	Galyon; Robbins	3:13
13.	"LA"		2:47
Total length:			39:36

=== Notes ===
- All track titles are stylized in all lowercase.

== Personnel ==
Adapted from the Kelsea liner notes

Vocals

- Kelsea Ballerini – lead vocals (all tracks), background vocals (tracks 2, 4–7, 9–13)
- Megan Boardman – background vocals (track 2)
- Kelly Bolton – background vocals (track 2)
- Kenny Chesney – background vocals (track 9)
- Ross Copperman – background vocals (tracks 4–6), gang vocals (track 7)
- Tarryn Feldman – background vocals (track 2)
- Nicolle Galyon – background vocals (track 3), gang vocals (track 7)
- Maggie Heintzman – background vocals (track 2)
- Hillary Lindsey – background vocals (tracks 5, 8)
- Julia Michaels – background vocals (track 11)
- Jensen Nicolaisen – background vocals (track 2)
- Tayla Parx – background vocals (track 1)
- Jimmy Robbins – background vocals (tracks 2, 3, 13), gang vocals (track 7)

Instruments

- Tom Bukovac – electric guitar (track 4)
- Ross Copperman – acoustic guitar, bass guitar, electric guitar, keyboards
- Dan Dugmore – pedal steel guitar (track 4)
- Fred Eltringham – drums (track 4)
- Alicia Enstrom – violin (track 6)
- Mark Hill – bass guitar (track 4)
- Austin Hoke – cello (track 6)
- Charlie Judge – keyboards (track 1)
- Chris Kimmerer – drums (track 12)
- Elizabeth Lamb – viola (track 6)
- Miles McPherson – drums (tracks 1, 8)
- Nir Z – drums (tracks 2, 11)
- Jimmy Robbins – acoustic guitar, banjo, bass guitar, electric guitar, mandolin
- Jimmie Lee Sloas – bass guitar (tracks 1, 8)
- Kristin Weber – violin (track 6)
- Derek Wells – acoustic guitar, banjo, dobro, electric guitar (tracks 1, 5, 8, 12), pedal steel guitar (track 5)

Production

- Dan Grech-Marguerat – mixing, additional programming
- Luke Burgoyne – assistant engineer
- Charles Haydon Hicks – assistant engineer
- Josh Ditty – assistant engineer (tracks 1, 8)
- Kam Luchterhand – assistant engineer (track 6)
- Trey Keller – digital editing (tracks 4–7, 9, 10)
- Dave Kutch – mastering (Mastering Palace; New York, NY)

Imagery

- Ashley Kohorst – Art direction and design
- Peggy Sirota – photography

== Charts ==
=== Weekly charts ===
Weekly chart performance
Chart (2020)	Peak position
Australian Albums (ARIA)	27
Australian Country Albums (ARIA)	4
Canadian Albums (Billboard)	23
Scottish Albums (Official Charts)	14
UK Albums (Official Charts)	84
UK Country Albums (Official Charts)	2
UK Independent Albums (Official Charts)	6
US Billboard 200	12
US Independent Albums (Billboard)	2
US Top Country Albums (Billboard)	2

=== Year-end charts ===
2020 year-end chart performance
Chart (2020)	Position
Australian Top Country Albums (ARIA)	44
US Independent Albums (Billboard)	30
US Top Country Albums (Billboard)	35

2021 year-end chart performance
Chart (2021)	Position
US Top Country Albums (Billboard)	74

== Certifications ==
Certifications and sales
Region	Certification	Certified units/sales
Canada (Music Canada)	Gold	40,000^{‡}
United States (RIAA)	Gold	500,000^{‡}
^{‡} Sales+streaming figures based on certification alone.
