= The Other Girl (song) =

Single by Kelsea Ballerini and Halsey

from the album Kelsea
- Released: April 20, 2020
- Genre: Country pop
- Length: 3:23 (single version)
- Label: Black River
- Songwriters: Kelsea Ballerini; Ross Copperman; Shane McAnally; Ashley Frangipane
- Producers: Kelsea Ballerini; Ross Copperman; Shane McAnally

Kelsea Ballerini singles chronology
| "Homecoming Queen?" (2019) | "The Other Girl" (2020) | "Hole in the Bottle" (2020) |

Halsey singles chronology
| "Experiment on Me" (2020) | "The Other Girl" (2020) | "Be Kind" (2020) |

Lyric video
- "The Other Girl" on YouTube

"The Other Girl" (stylized in all lowercase) is a song performed by American singer-songwriters Kelsea Ballerini and Halsey. It was released to country radio in the United States on April 20, 2020, as the second single from Ballerini's third studio album Kelsea (2020). Ballerini and Halsey co-wrote the song with Ross Copperman and Shane McAnally. It was released to pop radio formats in June 2020.

The track received positive reviews from music critics, who praised the lyrical storytelling and both women's performances. In the US, "The Other Girl" peaked at numbers 19 and 52 on the Billboard Hot Country Songs and Country Airplay charts, respectively. It also reached number 95 on the US Billboard Hot 100 songs chart. For promotion, Ballerini and Halsey performed the song live on the American television show CMT Crossroads on March 25, 2020. The song won a CMT Music Award for Performance of the Year, marking both artists' first award at the ceremony. An alternate solo recording of the song is also included on Ballerini's first remix album, Ballerini.

== Critical reception ==
Chris Parton of Sounds Like Nashville described the song as a "shimmering slice of futuristic country pop". Billy Dukes of Taste of Country wrote that the songwriters "practice exquisite word economy in drawing the setting and plot of this story, plus all the envy, anger, hurt that comes with it".

== Commercial performance ==
"The Other Girl" peaked at number 19 and 52 on the US Hot Country Songs and Country Airplay charts, respectively. It also reached number 95 on the US Billboard Hot 100. Due to the crossover promotion to pop formats, "The Other Girl" reached number 18 on the US Adult Pop Songs and number 34 on the US Pop Airplay charts.

== Live performance ==
Ballerini and Halsey performed "The Other Girl" on their episode of CMT Crossroads, which first aired March 25, 2020. The duo then performed the song at the 2020 CMT Music Awards; it won the award for Performance of the Year at the following CMT Music Awards in 2021, marking both Ballerini's and Halsey's first win at the award show.

== Track listing ==
Digital download

1. "The Other Girl (with Halsey) [The Other mix]" – 3:23
2. "The Other Girl (with Halsey)" – 3:21

== Charts ==
=== Weekly charts ===
List of weekly chart positions
| Chart (2020) | Peak position |
|---|---|
| Canadian Hot Digital Song Sales (Billboard) | 19 |
| New Zealand Hot Singles (RMNZ) | 18 |
| US Billboard Hot 100 | 95 |
| US Adult Pop Airplay (Billboard) | 17 |
| US Pop Airplay (Billboard) | 32 |
| US Country Airplay (Billboard) | 52 |
| US Hot Country Songs (Billboard) | 19 |

=== Year-end charts ===
List of year-end chart positions
| Chart (2020) | Position |
|---|---|
| US Hot Country Songs (Billboard) | 73 |

== Certifications ==
List of certifications and sales
| Region | Certification | Certified units/sales |
|---|---|---|
| Canada (Music Canada) | Gold | 40,000^{‡} |
| United States (RIAA) | Gold | 500,000^{‡} |
^{‡} Sales+streaming figures based on certification alone.

== Release history ==
List of release dates and formats
| Region | Date | Format(s) | Label | Ref. |
|---|---|---|---|---|
| United States | April 20, 2020 | Country radio | Black River | |
| Various | April 20, 2020 | Digital download; streaming | Black River | |
| United States | June 8, 2020 | Hot adult contemporary | The Orchard | |
| United States | June 9, 2020 | Contemporary hit radio | The Orchard | |
