= I Hate Love Songs =

Single by Kelsea Ballerini

from the album Unapologetically
- Released: March 12, 2018
- Genre: Country pop; doo-wop
- Length: 3:11
- Label: Black River
- Songwriters: Kelsea Ballerini; Shane McAnally; Trevor Rosen
- Producers: Forest Glen Whitehead; Jason Massey

Kelsea Ballerini singles chronology
"Legends" (2017)	"I Hate Love Songs" (2018)	"This Feeling" (2018)

Music video
- "I Hate Love Songs" on YouTube

"I Hate Love Songs" is a song recorded by American country pop singer Kelsea Ballerini for her second studio album, Unapologetically (2017). Ballerini co-wrote the track with Shane McAnally and Trevor Rosen. The song was released to American country radio on March 12, 2018, serving as the second single for the album.

"I Hate Love Songs" has reached number 25 on the Billboard Country Airplay and number 28 on the Hot Country Songs charts.

== Content ==
"I Hate Love Songs" is a doo-wop-inspired country pop song that speaks of Ballerini's distaste for romantic lyrical clichés. Critics noted the 1950s influence on the song's sound and the way in which it continues a trend in country music for blending "classic soul melodies" with "sing-a-long worthy" lyrical arrangements. The song's rhyme scheme and Ballerini's delivery have been compared to nursery rhymes.

The song was originally not going to be recorded for the album, but after receiving a standing ovation for her performance of it at the Grand Ole Opry in August 2017, Ballerini and her label, Black River Entertainment decided to include "I Hate Love Songs" on the record. "I called my label," Ballerini told Sounds Like Nashville, "and I was like, 'I think we need to cut this song.'"

== Music video ==
The music video premiered on CMT, GAC and Vevo in June 2018.

== Commercial performance ==
Upon the release of Unapologetically, "I Hate Love Songs" sold 10,000 copies and entered the Billboard Country Digital Song Sales chart dated November 25, 2017 at number 13. It concurrently debuted at number 39 on the Hot Country Songs chart. After it was announced as a single, "I Hate Love Songs" entered the Country Airplay chart at number 59. It reached a peak position of number 25, becoming the first single of Ballerini's career to miss the top three on the Country Airplay chart as well as the second to miss number one. The song has sold 94,000 copies in the United States as of September 2018.

== Charts ==
=== Weekly charts ===
Chart (2018)	Peak position
Scottish Singles Sales (Official Charts)	79
US Bubbling Under Hot 100 (Billboard)	25
US Country Airplay (Billboard)	25
US Hot Country Songs (Billboard)	28

=== Year-end charts ===
Chart (2018)	Position
US Hot Country Songs (Billboard)	73

== Certifications ==
Region	Certification	Certified units/sales
Canada (Music Canada)	Platinum	80,000^{‡}
United States (RIAA)	Gold	500,000^{‡}
^{‡} Sales+streaming figures based on certification alone.
