= Ballarini =

Ballarini is an Italian surname. Notable people with the surname include:

- Bruno Ballarini (1937–2015), Italian footballer
- Joe Ballarini, American film director, screenwriter and author
- Marco Ballarini (born 2001), Italian footballer
- Paolo Ballarini, 18th-century Italian painter

== See also ==
- Ballerini
