= Miss Me More =

Single by Kelsea Ballerini

from the album Unapologetically
- Released: October 15, 2018
- Genre: Country pop
- Length: 3:12
- Label: Black River
- Songwriters: Kelsea Ballerini; David Hodges; Brett McLaughlin
- Producers: Jason Massey; Forest Glen Whitehead

Kelsea Ballerini singles chronology
"This Feeling" (2018)	"Miss Me More" (2018)	"Homecoming Queen?" (2019)

Music video
- "Miss Me More" on YouTube

"Miss Me More" is a song recorded by American singer-songwriter Kelsea Ballerini for her second studio album, Unapologetically (2017). Ballerini co-wrote the song with David Hodges and Brett McLaughlin. "Miss Me More" was released digitally on October 20, 2017, as the album's third and final promotional single, and was later serviced to American country radio on October 15, 2018, as the third and final single from the album. Ballerini named her 2019 tour after the single.

The song received positive reviews from critics praising the production and Ballerini's delivery of the lyrics. "Miss Me More" peaked at numbers two and seven on both the Billboard Country Airplay and Hot Country Songs charts respectively. It also reached number 47 on the Hot 100 chart. It was certified Platinum by the Recording Industry Association of America (RIAA), denoting sales of over one million units in the country. The song achieved similar success in Canada, giving Ballerini her first number-one hit on the Canada Country chart and reaching number 74 on the Canadian Hot 100 chart. The accompanying music video for the song, directed by Shane Drake, features Ballerini in a boxing match against herself. It was nominated for Video of the Year at the 2019 CMT Music Awards. For promotion, Ballerini first performed the song live at the Country Music Association Awards and would make later appearances at The Voice, the 2019 CMT Music Awards and CMT Crossroads with Halsey.

== Critical reception ==
In a review of Unapologetically, Annie Reuter of Sounds Like Nashville wrote that on "Miss Me More", Ballerini confidently "stands her ground" between "slick beats and a catchy chorus." Jon Caramanica of The New York Times wrote that "Miss Me More" is "one of the fiercest songs on the album," adding that she "excels" on tracks where she brings down a deserving male subject.

== Commercial performance ==
"Miss Me More" debuted at number 28 on the Billboard Hot Country Songs chart dated November 11, 2017 after its digital release. The song later peaked at number seven after its release as a single. "Miss Me More" debuted at number 54 on the Billboard Country Airplay chart dated November 3, 2018. It reached the peak position of number two on June 9, 2019. However, "Miss Me More" hit number one on the Mediabase airplay chart. The song was the first number one from a solo female artist on the chart in over 15 months, with the previous such song notably being Ballerini's own 2017 single, "Legends". "Miss Me More" was certified platinum by the Recording Industry Association of America (RIAA) on August 5, 2019. It has sold 231,000 copies in the United States as of July 2019.

In Canada, "Miss Me More" peaked at number one the Canada Country airplay chart dated May 11, 2019, becoming her first song to top the chart in that country. The song also peaked at number 74 on the Canadian Hot 100.

== Music video ==
An accompanying music video directed by Shane Drake premiered November 9, 2018, after being delayed by one day out of respect for the victims of the November 7 Thousand Oaks shooting. In the clip, Ballerini readies herself for a boxing match, with her opponent later being revealed to be the version of herself she became during a relationship. After the true Ballerini defeats her former self, she "reclaims her identity" and gives the camera a knowing smirk as she walks off screen. It was nominated for Video of the Year and Female Video of the Year at the 2019 CMT Music Awards but they both went to Carrie Underwood's "Cry Pretty" and "Love Wins" respectively.

== Live performances ==
On November 14, 2018, Ballerini first performed the song live at the 52nd Annual Country Music Association Awards. Thirteen days later, she performed it on season 15 of The Voice during the Top 11 Eliminations. On June 5, 2019, she performed the song at the 2019 CMT Music Awards. On March 25, 2020, it was performed on CMT Crossroads as a duet with Halsey.

== Charts ==
=== Weekly charts ===
Chart (2018–2019)	Peak position
Canada Hot 100 (Billboard)	74
Canada Country (Billboard)	1
US Billboard Hot 100	47
US Adult Pop Airplay (Billboard)	17
US Country Airplay (Billboard)	2
US Hot Country Songs (Billboard)	7
US Rolling Stone Top 100	83

=== Year-end charts ===
Chart (2019)	Position
US Country Airplay (Billboard)	13
US Hot Country Songs (Billboard)	17

== Certifications ==
Region	Certification	Certified units/sales
Canada (Music Canada)	2× Platinum	160,000^{‡}
United States (RIAA)	2× Platinum	2,000,000^{‡}
^{‡} Sales+streaming figures based on certification alone.

== Release history ==
Country	Date	Format	Label	Ref.
Various	October 20, 2017	Digital download (Note: As a promotional single.)	Black River	
United States	October 15, 2018	Country radio	Black River	
United States	May 20, 2019	Hot adult contemporary	Black River	
Various	June 21, 2019	Digital download – "Summer Mix"	Black River	
