= Hole in the Bottle =

Single by Kelsea Ballerini

from the album Kelsea
- Released: May 27, 2020
- Genre: Country
- Length: 2:36 (album version); 2:26 (radio edit)
- Label: Black River
- Songwriters: Kelsea Ballerini; Jesse Frasure; Hillary Lindsey; Ashley Gorley; Steph Jones
- Producers: Kelsea Ballerini; Jesse Frasure

Kelsea Ballerini singles chronology
"The Other Girl" (2020)	"Hole in the Bottle" (2020)	"Half of My Hometown" (2021)

Music video
- "Hole in the Bottle" on YouTube

"Hole in the Bottle" (stylized in all lowercase) is a song by American singer Kelsea Ballerini. It was released to country radio on May 27, 2020, as the third single from Ballerini's third studio album, Kelsea. A remix of the song, featuring Shania Twain, was released on November 13. An alternate recording of the song is also included on Ballerini's first remix album, Ballerini.

== Content ==
Ballerini co-wrote the song with Jesse Frasure, Hillary Lindsey, Ashley Gorley, and Steph Jones. Described as an "upbeat, slightly silly and twangy, yet poppy" drinking song, the song is about getting over a breakup with the help of wine. Ballerini debuted the song at CRS on February 19, 2020 and called it her 'first-ever drinking song.' It was released on February 28, 2020 as a promotional single ahead of the album.

== Release and promotion ==
"Hole in the Bottle" was serviced to country radio on May 27, becoming the third single of Ballerini's third studio album, Kelsea (2020). Its remix featuring Shania Twain was released on November 13. The song's alternative version is included on Ballerini's first remix album, Ballerini (2020).

== Music video ==
A lyric video for the song premiered on Ballerini's official YouTube channel on February 27, 2020. Its accompanying music video premiered on August 31, and was directed by Hannah Lux Davis. It begins in a vintage black-and-white style with Ballerini dressed in flapper wardrobe reminiscent of the 1920s. Once the first chorus hits, colored scenes are introduced and she is shown in a house painting a portrait of her dog Dibs, in a field with a couple friends who join her in lounging on a bed and perform a dance routine with the singer, and playing chess with herself.

== Charts ==
=== Weekly charts ===
Chart (2020–2021)	Peak position
Canada Hot 100 (Billboard)	41
Canada Country (Billboard)	1
US Billboard Hot 100	39
US Country Airplay (Billboard)	2
US Hot Country Songs (Billboard)	6

=== Year-end charts ===
Chart (2020)	Position
US Hot Country Songs (Billboard)	70

Chart (2021)	Position
US Country Airplay (Billboard)	43
US Hot Country Songs (Billboard)	52

== Certifications ==
Certifications and sales
Region	Certification	Certified units/sales
Canada (Music Canada)	2× Platinum	160,000^{‡}
United States (RIAA)	Platinum	1,000,000^{‡}
^{‡} Sales+streaming figures based on certification alone.
