= This Feeling (The Chainsmokers song) =

Single by The Chainsmokers featuring Kelsea Ballerini

from the album Sick Boy and Unapologetically (deluxe)
- Released: September 18, 2018
- Genre: Synth-pop
- Length: 3:19
- Label: Disruptor; Columbia
- Songwriters: Andrew Taggart; Alex Pall; Emily Warren
- Producer: The Chainsmokers

The Chainsmokers singles chronology
"Save Yourself" (2018)	"This Feeling" (2018)	"Siren" (2018)

Kelsea Ballerini singles chronology
"I Hate Love Songs" (2018)	"This Feeling" (2018)	"Miss Me More" (2018)

Music video
- "This Feeling" on YouTube

"This Feeling" is a song by American DJ and production duo The Chainsmokers featuring American singer Kelsea Ballerini. Written by the Chainsmokers and Emily Warren, with production handled by former, it was released by Disruptor and Columbia Records on September 18, 2018, as the seventh single from the Chainsmokers' second studio album, Sick Boy. It is also featured on the deluxe edition of Ballerini's second studio album, Unapologetically.

== Composition ==
The Chainsmokers produced and co-wrote the synth-pop song "This Feeling" with Emily Warren.

== Live performances ==
Kelsea Ballerini and the Chainsmokers debuted the song on The Ellen DeGeneres Show. They also performed the song on November 19, on the ESPN Monday Night Football's Genesis Halftime Show between the Los Angeles Rams and the Kansas City Chiefs at the Los Angeles Memorial Coliseum. They also performed the song at Victoria's Secret Fashion Show 2018.

== Music video ==
The music video was released on November 12, 2018, featuring both the Chainsmokers and Ballerini participating in a motocross race while facing inner conflicts. The video ends with a mysterious shot of "multiple bikes laid out in what appears to be a crash with sirens blaring in the background".

== Commercial performance ==
"This Feeling" has sold 145,000 copies in the United States as of March 2019. It has been certified triple Platinum by the Recording Industry Association of America (RIAA) for over 3 million units in combined sales and streams.

== Charts ==
=== Weekly charts ===
Weekly chart performance
Chart (2018–2019)	Peak position
Australia (ARIA)	17
Australia Dance (ARIA)	4
Austria (Ö3 Austria Top 40)	50
Belgium (Ultratip Bubbling Under Flanders)	11
Belgium (Ultratip Bubbling Under Wallonia)	8
Canada Hot 100 (Billboard)	34
Canada AC (Billboard)	36
Canada CHR/Top 40 (Billboard)	10
Canada Hot AC (Billboard)	21
Croatia (HRT)	38
Czech Republic Singles Digital (ČNS IFPI)	20
France (SNEP)	197
Greece International Digital Singles (IFPI)	41
Hungary (Stream Top 40)	24
Ireland (IRMA)	26
Japan Hot 100 (Billboard)	72
Japan Hot Overseas (Billboard)	5
Lithuania (AGATA)	19
Malaysia (RIM)	12
New Zealand (Recorded Music NZ)	23
Portugal (AFP)	53
Scottish Singles Sales (Official Charts)	27
Singapore (RIAS)	7
Slovakia Airplay (ČNS IFPI)	46
Slovakia Singles Digital (ČNS IFPI)	22
Sweden (Sverigetopplistan)	30
Switzerland (Schweizer Hitparade)	88
UK Singles (Official Charts)	63
UK Dance (Official Charts)	9
US Billboard Hot 100	50
US Adult Pop Airplay (Billboard)	15
US Dance Airplay (Billboard)	3
US Hot Dance/Electronic Songs (Billboard)	4
US Pop Airplay (Billboard)	9

=== Year-end charts ===
Year-end chart performance
Chart (2018)	Position
US Hot Dance/Electronic Songs (Billboard)	29
Chart (2019)	Position
US Hot Dance/Electronic Songs (Billboard)	6
US Mainstream Top 40 (Billboard)	43

== Certifications ==
Certifications and sales
Region	Certification	Certified units/sales
Australia (ARIA)	2× Platinum	140,000^{‡}
Brazil (Pro-Música Brasil)	2× Platinum	80,000^{‡}
Canada (Music Canada)	3× Platinum	240,000^{‡}
Denmark (IFPI Danmark)	Gold	45,000^{‡}
Mexico (AMPROFON)	Gold	30,000^{‡}
New Zealand (RMNZ)	2× Platinum	60,000^{‡}
Poland (ZPAV)	Gold	10,000^{‡}
United Kingdom (BPI)	Silver	200,000^{‡}
United States (RIAA)	3× Platinum	3,000,000^{‡}
^{‡} Sales+streaming figures based on certification alone.
