= Ballerini (album) =

Remix album by Kelsea Ballerini
- Released: September 11, 2020
- Length: 40:45
- Label: Black River
- Producer: Kelsea Ballerini; Jimmy Robbins

Kelsea Ballerini chronology
| Kelsea (2020) | Ballerini (2020) | Subject to Change (2022) |

Ballerini (stylized in all lowercase) is the first remix album from American singer Kelsea Ballerini. The album, released through Black River Entertainment on September 11, 2020, features songs from Kelsea, her third studio album, which were stripped down and re-recorded.

== Background ==
Jessica Nicholson of MusicRow stated that "Ballerini deconstructed each song and re-recorded everything with minimal accompaniment, instead focusing on letting each song’s melody and lyrics lead the way".

== Critical reception ==
Joseph Hudak of Rolling Stone stated that "the Ballerini interpretation [of "Club"] emphasizes those notions of detachment and depression". Matthew Leimkuehler of The Tennessean stated that Ballerini "took to the studio to reimagine Kelsea, substituting dazzling pop layer each song for renditions rooted in unvarnished songwriting".

== Track listing ==
All tracks are written by Kelsea Ballerini, with additional co-writers as noted.

| No. | Title | Writer(s) | Length |
|---|---|---|---|
| 1. | "Overshare" | Jesse Frasure; Josh Osborne; Tayla Parx | 2:52 |
| 2. | "Club" | Nicolle Galyon; Jimmy Robbins | 2:46 |
| 3. | "Homecoming Queen?" | Galyon; Robbins | 2:57 |
| 4. | "The Other Girl" | Ross Copperman; Shane McAnally | 3:33 |
| 5. | "Love Me Like a Girl" | Copperman; Lauren Grieve; Hillary Lindsey; Jordan Minton | 3:52 |
| 6. | "Love and Hate" | Copperman; Ed Sheeran | 2:43 |
| 7. | "Bragger" | Copperman; Galyon; McAnally; Robbins | 2:54 |
| 8. | "Hole in the Bottle" | Frasure; Lindsey; Ashley Gorley; Steph Jones | 2:32 |
| 9. | "Half of My Hometown" (featuring Kenny Chesney) | Copperman; Galyon; McAnally; Robbins | 3:56 |
| 10. | "The Way I Used To" | Jones; Julian Bunetta; Ian Kirkpatrick; Samuel George Lewis; Marcus Lomax; Cass Lowe | 3:19 |
| 11. | "Needy" | Copperman; Julia Michaels | 3:16 |
| 12. | "A Country Song" | Galyon; Robbins | 3:07 |
| 13. | "LA" | | 2:58 |
| Total length: | | | 40:45 |

== Charts ==
=== Weekly charts ===
Weekly chart performance for Ballerini
| Chart (2020) | Peak position |
|---|---|
| UK Album Downloads (OCC) | 30 |
| US Billboard 200 | 89 |
| US Top Country Albums (Billboard) | 9 |

=== Year-end charts ===
2020 Year-end chart performance for Ballerini
| Chart (2020) | Position |
|---|---|
| US Top Country Albums (Billboard) | 97 |

2021 Year-end chart performance for Ballerini
| Chart (2021) | Position |
|---|---|
| US Top Country Albums (Billboard) | 93 |

== Certifications ==
Certifications for Ballerini
| Region | Certification | Certified units/sales |
|---|---|---|
| Canada (Music Canada) | Gold | 40,000^{‡} |
^{‡} Sales+streaming figures based on certification alone.
