= Kelsea Ballerini =

American country singer and songwriter (born 1993)

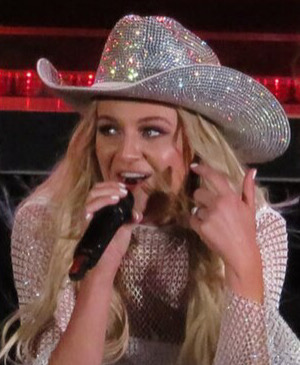
- Ballerini in 2021

Background information
- Born: Kelsea Nicole Ballerini; September 12, 1993 (age 33); Mascot, Tennessee, US
- Origin: Knoxville, Tennessee, US
- Genres: Country; pop
- Occupations: Singer; songwriter
- Instruments: Vocals; guitar
- Works: Discography
- Years active: 2014–present
- Label: Black River
- Spouse: Morgan Evans (m. 2017; div. 2022)
- Website: kelseaballerini.com

Kelsea Nicole Ballerini (born September 12, 1993) is an American country singer and songwriter. A five-time Grammy Award nominee, she began having success in the 2010s, being honored with the Gene Weed Milestone Award at the Academy of Country Music Awards and the Rising Star Award at the Billboard Women in Music.

She began songwriting as a child and signed a contract with Black River Entertainment in 2014, releasing her debut studio album, The First Time, in 2015. Her second album, Unapologetically, followed in 2017. The two albums account for seven songs on the Hot Country Songs and Country Airplay charts. She has five No. 1 singles on the latter, starting with her debut single "Love Me Like You Mean It", which made her the first female artist to send a debut single to the top of that chart since Carrie Underwood in 2006. It was followed by "Dibs" and "Peter Pan", whose peaks also made her the first female country artist to send her first three singles to the top of that chart since Wynonna Judd.

Her third studio album, Kelsea, and a counterpart acoustic album, Ballerini, were both released in 2020. The collaboration "Half of My Hometown" with Kenny Chesney garnered two Country Music Association Awards. Her fourth studio album, Subject to Change, was released in 2022. Her second EP, Rolling Up the Welcome Mat, followed in 2023. She released her fifth album, Patterns, in late 2024. On November 14, 2025, Ballerini released her third EP, Mount Pleasant.

== Early life ==
An only child, Kelsea Nicole Ballerini was born on September 12, 1993, in Mascot, Tennessee, to Ed and Carla Ballerini. Kelsea grew up in Knoxville. She is of Italian, German and Scottish descent. Ed Ballerini was a sales manager at a country radio station. Carla worked in marketing for the Bible publishing division of Thomas Nelson and for a sponsorship company. Kelsea started taking dance lessons at Premiere Dance Studio in Seymour, Tennessee, south of Knoxville when she was three and quit ten years later. She also sang in a church choir and the school choir. She wrote her first song at 12 for her mother and moved to Nashville three years later. Kelsea attended Central High School in Knoxville, Centennial High School in Franklin, Tennessee; and studied at Lipscomb University in Nashville for two years before pursuing a musical career.

== Career ==
=== 2014–2016: Self-titled EP and The First Time ===
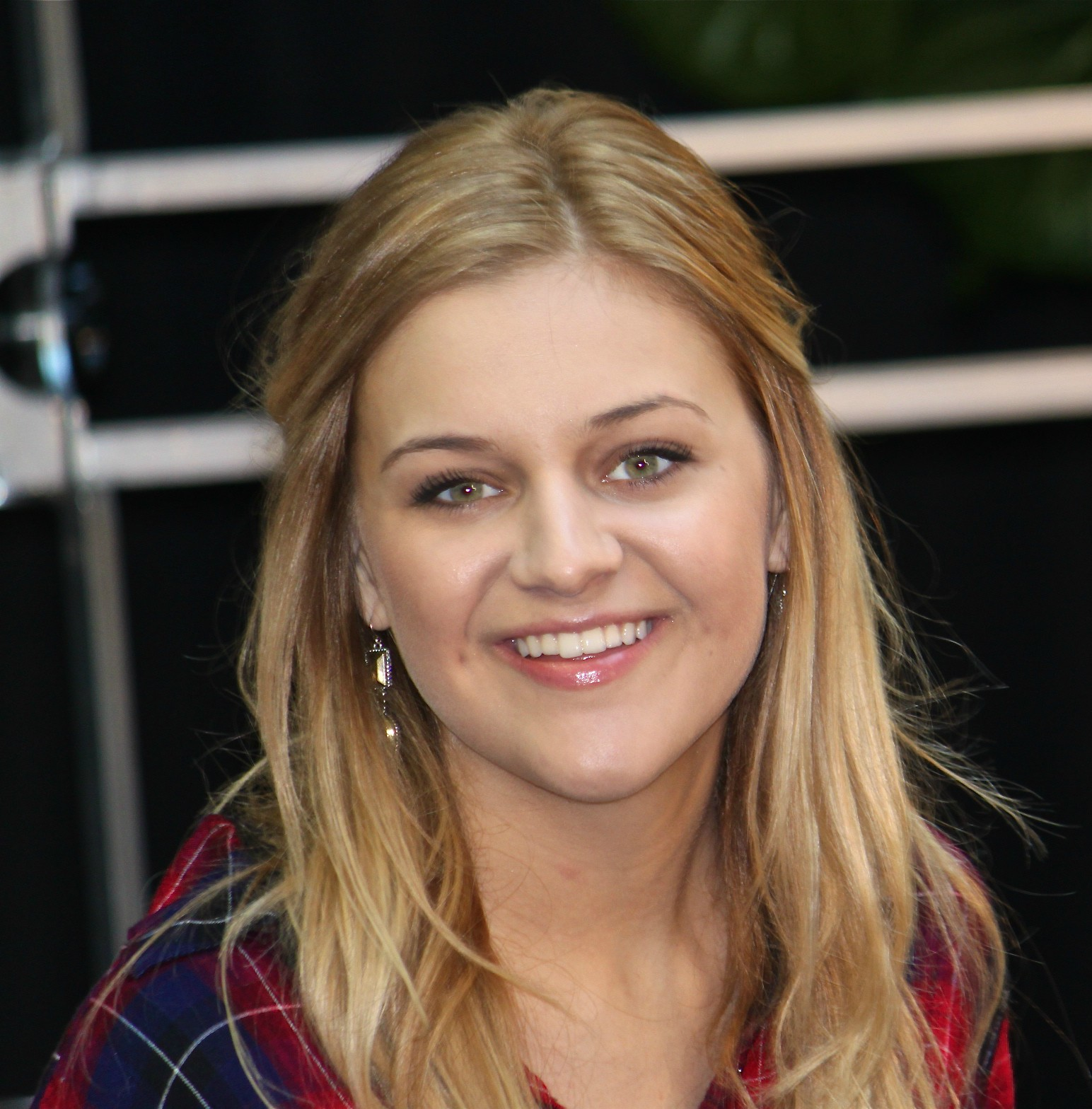
Ballerini in September 2014

At 19, Ballerini signed a record deal with Black River Entertainment. In late 2014, she released her debut single, "Love Me Like You Mean It"—which peaked atop the US Country Airplay chart—and a self-titled extended play (EP) for the label in November, being named one of Country Music Television (CMT)'s Next Women of Country for that year.

In 2015, Ballerini was a supporting act for Lady A's Wheels Up Tour. She also performed at the Grand Ole Opry for the first time on February 14, sang "Love Me Like You Mean It", and announced her debut studio album, The First Time, released through Black River on May 19. For the chart dated July 4, "Love Me Like You Mean It" reached number one on the US Country Airplay chart, making Ballerini the first solo female country music artist to score a number one hit with her debut single since Carrie Underwood did so with "Jesus, Take the Wheel" in 2006, and only the eleventh in history to achieve the feat. Ballerini also became only the fifth solo female country music artist to score back-to-back number one hits with her first two singles when "Dibs" reached the top of the Country Airplay chart and the first to do it since Jamie O'Neal in 2001. In October, Ballerini joined Dan + Shay as a supporting act on select dates of their Just the Right Kind of Crazy Tour.

The third single, "Peter Pan", was released to country radio on March 21, 2016. It reached number one on both the Country Airplay and Hot Country Songs charts in September, making Ballerini the first solo female country music artist to top both country music charts simultaneously. The achievement also made her the first solo female to send her first three singles to number one since Wynonna Judd accomplished the same feat in 1992. Ballerini participated in Rascal Flatts's Rhythm and Roots Tour with Chris Lane as an opener, which began on June 17 and concluded on September 17. In August, Ballerini covered Alison Krauss's song "Ghost in This House" alongside him at the CMT Artists of the Year Awards. "Yeah Boy", the fourth single from The First Time, was released to country radio on October 10. Ballerini embarked on the First Time Tour that began on October 21 at Houston and concluded on December 10 at Las Vegas.

=== 2017–2018: Unapologetically and The Voice ===
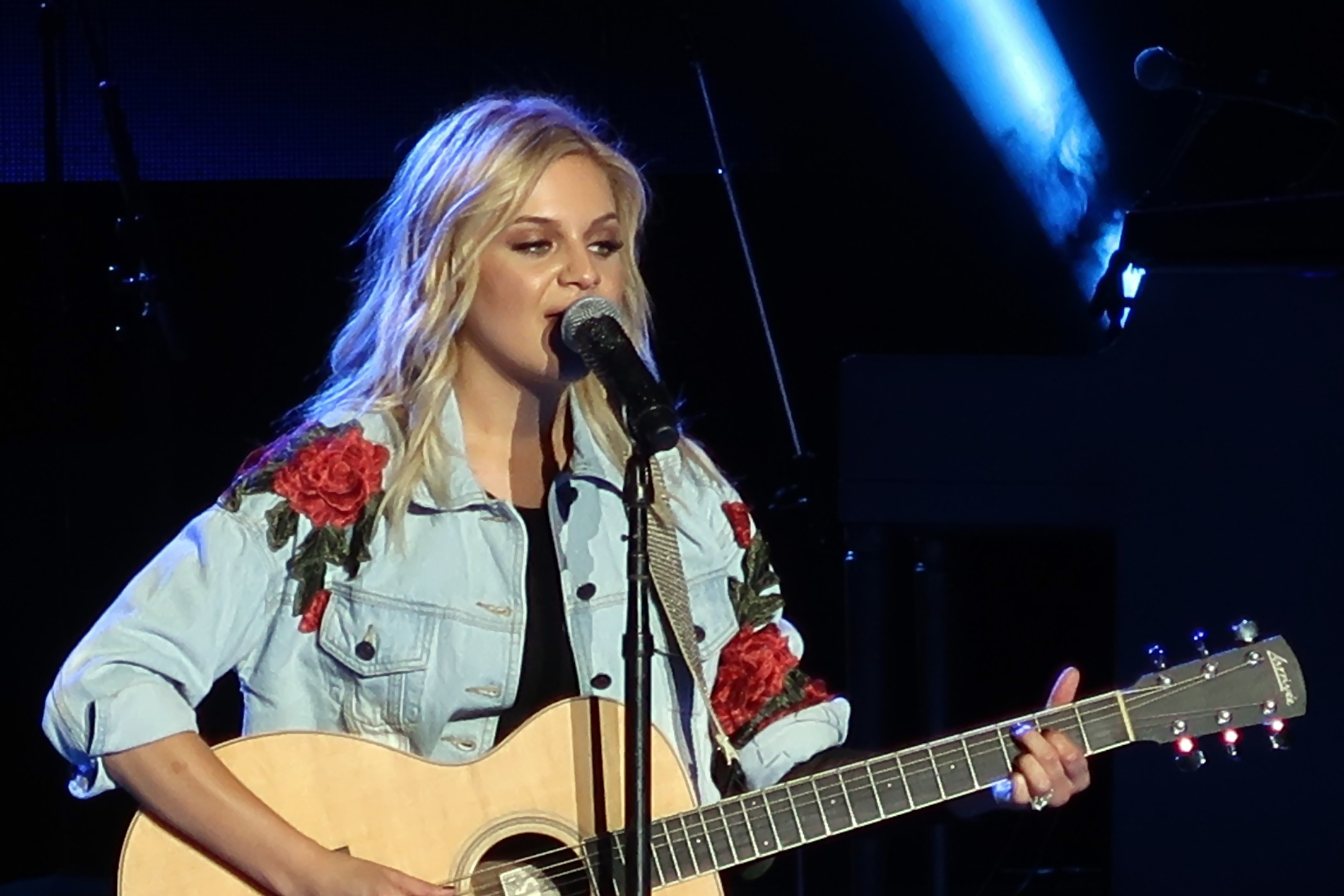
Ballerini performing at the Washington State Fair in Puyallup, September 2017

In early 2017, Ballerini was named to Forbes magazine's 30 Under 30 – Music list at number two. That year, she also received two Academy of Country Music Award nominations for Female Vocalist of the Year and Video of the Year for "Peter Pan". Ballerini joined Thomas Rhett's Home Team Tour which began on February 23 and concluded on April 21. She also joined Lady A's You Look Good World Tour which began in May. In June, Ballerini released "Legends" as the first single from her then upcoming second studio album, Unapologetically, released on November 3. The album debuted at number three on the US Top Country Albums and number seven on the Billboard 200 chart, making it her highest-charting album on both charts.

Ballerini embarked on the Unapologetically Tour which began on February 8, 2018, at Birmingham and conluded on April 27 at Indio. In March, the second single from the album, "I Hate Love Songs", was released. Ballerini was a special guest for Keith Urban's Graffiti U World Tour that began on June 5 and concluded on November 3. In September, she announced that she would be releasing a deluxe edition of the album with four new tracks. On September 18, the Chainsmokers released a song titled "This Feeling" featuring Ballerini, and they later performed at the 2018 Victoria's Secret Fashion Show in November. The third and final single from Unapologetically, "Miss Me More," was released in October. That month, she provided vocals on her husband Morgan Evans's song "Dance with Me" and released a song "We Were Like". Ballerini also joined the 15th season of The Voice as the fifth coach—where she coached six contestants who did not get a chair turn during The Blinds—in a new round called The Comeback Stage, a digital companion series to the show. In December, Unapologetically received a nomination for Best Country Album at the 61st annual Grammy Awards.

=== 2019–2021: Kelsea and Ballerini ===
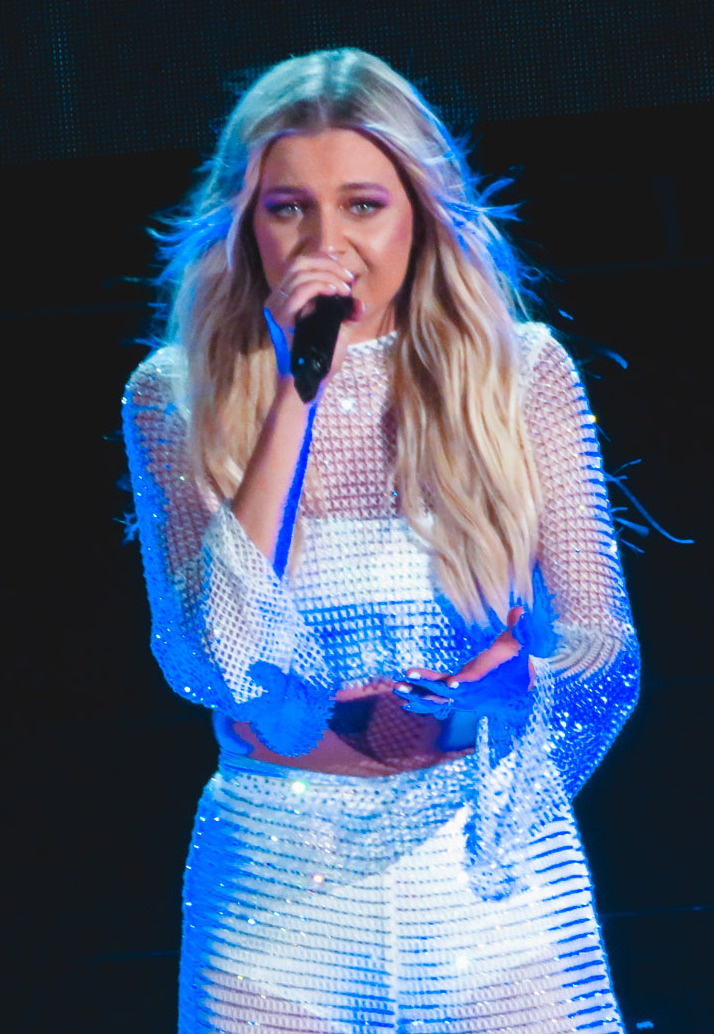
Kelsea Ballerini performing at Red Rocks Amphitheatre near Morrison, Colorado, September 2021

Ballerini joined Kelly Clarkson's Meaning of Life Tour on selected days in 2019. On March 5, Ballerini was invited by Little Big Town to become a member of the Grand Ole Opry. On April 16, she was inducted into the Grand Ole Opry by Underwood. In support of Unapologetically, Ballerini embarked on the Miss Me More Tour that month. In June, Ballerini was a guest on the NBC competition show Songland and released the song "Better Luck Next Time". In July, Ballerini confirmed in an Instagram that work on her third studio album was complete. On September 6, Ballerini released the first single from her then upcoming third album, titled "Homecoming Queen?". The song debuted at number 22 on the Country Airplay chart. On November 8, Ballerini released the album's first promotional single, "Club".

On January 20, 2020, Ballerini confirmed that the album is self-titled as Kelsea and would be released on March 20. The announcement coincided with the release of the second promotional single, "LA". On February 28, she released the third promotional single, "Hole in the Bottle", and announced the tracklist for Kelsea, including "Half of My Hometown" featuring Kenny Chesney and "The Other Girl" featuring Halsey. "The Other Girl" and "Hole in the Bottle" were later serviced to country radio on April 20 and May 27, as the second and third single. On September 2, Ballerini announced a counterpart album to Kelsea, titled Ballerini, featuring stripped-down versions of the songs. It was released on September 11, 2020, and the stripped-down version of "Club" was released alongside the album announcement. She described Ballerini as "emotional, vulnerable and soft" while Kelsea showed her "bold and effervescent" side. As of October 16, 2026, Kelsea and Ballerini could be purchased physically as a double album, exclusively from Target.

On April 18, 2021, Ballerini and Chesney performed "Half of My Hometown" at the 56th Academy of Country Music Awards. The song was released to country radio a day later, marking Kelsea's fourth and final single. That year, Ballerini temporarily filled in for Kelly Clarkson as a coach during Season 20 of The Voice. She also co-hosted the 2021 CMT Music Awards with Kane Brown, where she won the award for CMT Performance of the Year for "The Other Girl". In May, it was announced she would be an opening act on the Jonas Brothers's Remember This Tour which began in August. Her debut book of poetry, Feel Your Way Through, was released on November 16.

=== 2022–2024: Subject to Change and Rolling Up the Welcome Mat ===
In April 2022, Ballerini released "Heartfirst" as the first single from her fourth studio album, Subject to Change. The song debuted at number 24 on the US Country Airplay chart, peaking at number 23. While co-hosting during the 2022 CMT Music Awards, she performed the song for the first time. Its music video premiered on July 7. On July 15, the first promotional single, "Love Is a Cowboy" was released along with the music video. Two promotional singles, "The Little Things" and "What I Have", followed on August 5 and September 2, respectively. Featuring a collaboration, "You're Drunk, Go Home" with Clarkson and Carly Pearce, Subject to Change was released on September 23. That day, Ballerini performed "Heartfirst" on Good Morning America, as well as "Love Is a Cowboy" on The Late Late Show with James Corden (September 27) and "What I Have" on The Kelly Clarkson Show (September 30). She also embarked on the Heartfirst Tour from September 24 at New York to October 14 at Mashantucket. In November, "Heartfirst" was nominated for Best Country Solo Performance at the 65th Annual Grammy Awards. On December 5, "If You Go Down (I'm Goin' Down Too)" was released as the album's second single.

In early 2023, Ballerini joined the Judds's the Final Tour on selected dates. On February 13, Ballerini announced that her short film and EP, Rolling Up the Welcome Mat, would be released the next day. Promoting the EP, she performed "Blindsided" and "Penthouse" on the March 5 episode of Saturday Night Live. Peaking at number 48 on the US Billboard 200 and number 11 on the US Top Country Albums chart, the EP was ranked at numbers 19 and 98 on Billboard's The 50 Best Albums of 2023 and Rolling Stone's The 100 Best Albums of 2023 year-end lists, respectively. From March to July, Chesney and Ballerini embarked on the I Go Back Tour.

=== 2024–present: Patterns, The Voice and Mount Pleasant ===
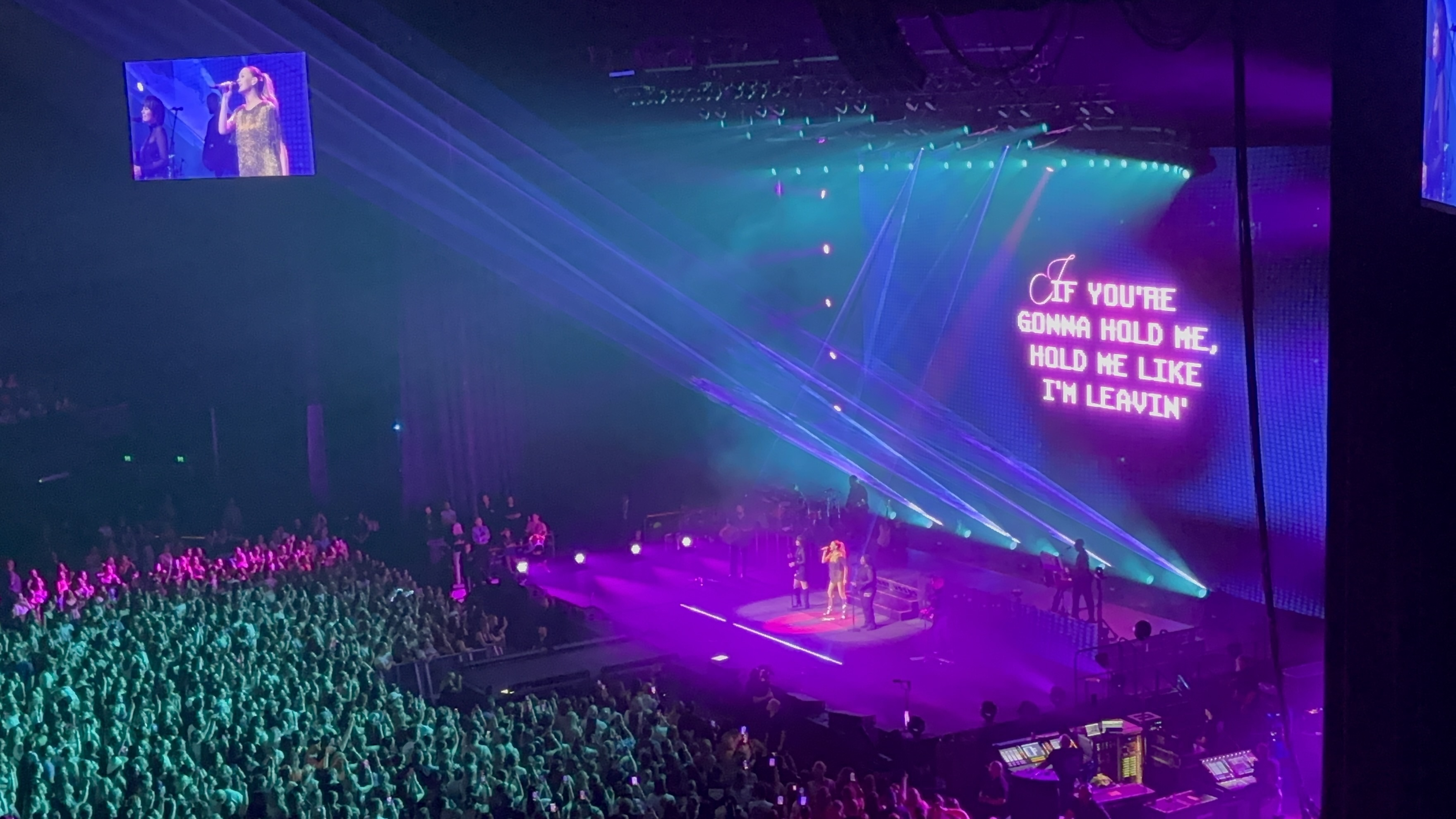
Ballerini performing live in Sydney, Australia in December 2025

On June 28, 2024, Ballerini released a collaboration with American singer-songwriter Noah Kahan, called "Cowboys Cry Too", the first single from her then upcoming fifth studio album. On August 8, she announced that the album would be called Patterns, and the song "Sorry Mom" would be released the following day. The second single from the album, "Baggage" was released on May 5, while the album was released on October 25. She also embarked its accompanying tour, beginning on January 31 at Van Andel Arena and concluding on March 30 at Ball Arena. In September, it was announced that Ballerini would make her acting debut in a guest role on the upcoming ABC series Doctor Odyssey. She made its debut on November 7, appearing the series' official teaser.

Ballerini embarked on the Live on Tour, beginning at Grand Rapids on January 21, 2025, and concluding at Denver on March 30. In February, she debuted as a coach on the twenty-seventh season of The Voice. In November, she announced that her third EP, Mount Pleasant, would be released on November 14. It was supported by the lead single "I Sit in Parks", released on November 7.

== Influences ==
A country pop artist, Ballerini's music combines elements of country and pop and she has been influenced by artists in both genres. Originally influenced by pop, she said: "I grew up on top 40 pop. I didn't know what country music was, which is so funny because I grew up in East Tennessee." She listed Britney Spears, Christina Aguilera, Kelly Clarkson , NSYNC, Faith Hill, and Hilary Duff among the early artists who inspired her. Ballerini also cited Justin Bieber as being an early pop musical inspiration.

It was not until Ballerini heard "Stupid Boy" by Keith Urban that she decided to delve deeper into country music by listening to albums by Taylor Swift, Sugarland, and the Chicks. Ballerini credited Swift's self-titled debut studio album (2006) for introducing her to country music, citing Shania Twain as her greatest influence.

== Personal life ==
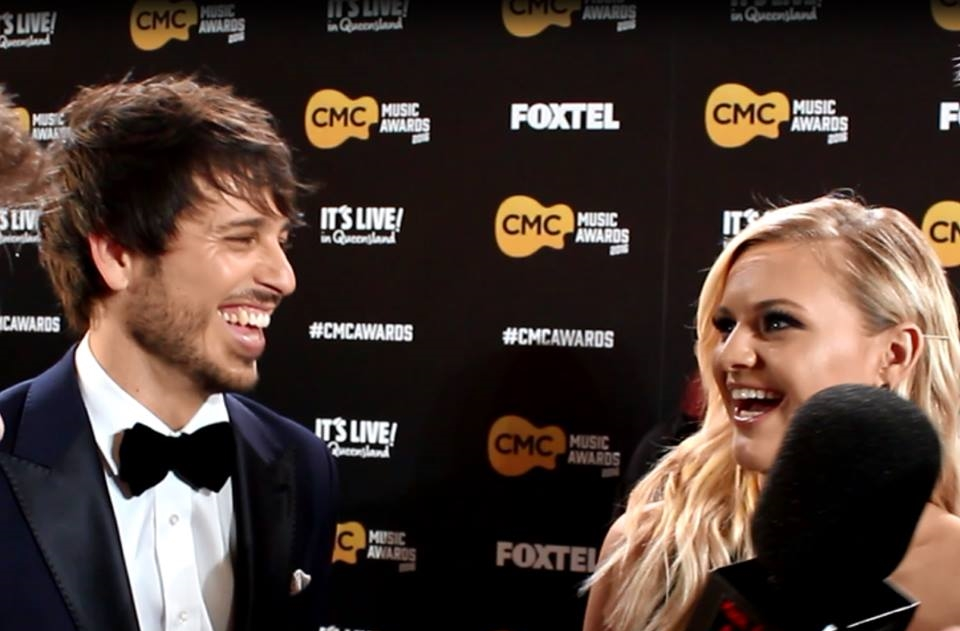
Morgan Evans and Ballerini during a Planet Country interview on the CMC Awards red carpet in March 2016, around the time they began dating; they hosted the show in Brisbane, Australia.

In March 2016, Ballerini began dating Australian singer Morgan Evans. They were engaged on Christmas Day in 2016, and married on December 2, 2017, in Cabo San Lucas, Mexico. On August 29, 2022, Ballerini announced that she and Evans were divorcing. On November 3, it was revealed that Ballerini and Evans had reached a settlement, and their divorce was finalized on November 15. In February 2023, it was confirmed that Ballerini was dating Outer Banks actor Chase Stokes. The couple broke up in February 2026 after an on-and-off relationship.

Ballerini attended Central High School in Knoxville and was at the school during the 2008 shooting. She said that she has post-traumatic stress disorder as a result of the experience. Ballerini is a long-time supporter of St. Jude Children's Research Hospital.

== Discography ==
- The First Time (2015)
- Unapologetically (2017)
- Kelsea (2020)
- Subject to Change (2022)
- Patterns (2024)

== Awards and nominations ==
Award	Year	Work	Category	Result	Ref.
Academy of Country Music Awards	2016	New Female Vocalist of the Year	Herself	Won	
Academy of Country Music Awards	2016	Female Vocalist of the Year	Herself	Nominated	
Academy of Country Music Awards	2017	Gene Weed Milestone Award	Herself	Won	
Academy of Country Music Awards	2017	Female Vocalist of the Year	Herself	Nominated	
Academy of Country Music Awards	2017	"Peter Pan"	Video of the Year	Nominated	
Academy of Country Music Awards	2018	Herself	Female Vocalist of the Year	Nominated	
Academy of Country Music Awards	2018	"Legends"	Video of the Year	Nominated	
Academy of Country Music Awards	2020	Herself	Female Artist of the Year	Nominated	
Academy of Country Music Awards	2021	Herself	Female Artist of the Year	Nominated	
Academy of Country Music Awards	2022	"Half of My Hometown" (with Kenny Chesney)	Music Event of the Year	Nominated	
Academy of Country Music Awards	2023	Herself	Female Artist of the Year	Nominated	
Academy of Country Music Awards	2024	Herself	Female Vocalist of the Year	Nominated	
Academy of Country Music Awards	2024	Rolling Up the Welcome Mat (For Good)	Album of the Year	Nominated	
Academy of Country Music Awards	2025	Herself	Entertainer of the Year	Nominated	
Academy of Country Music Awards	2025	Herself	Female Artist of the Year	Nominated	
Academy of Country Music Awards	2025	"Cowboys Cry Too" (with Noah Kahan)	Music Event of the Year	Nominated	
Academy of Country Music Awards	2026	Herself	Female Artist of the Year	Nominated	
American Music Awards	2015	Herself	Favorite Country Female Artist	Nominated	
American Music Awards	2016	Herself	Favorite Country Female Artist	Nominated	
American Music Awards	2018	Herself	Favorite Country Female Artist	Nominated	
Billboard Music Awards	2018	Herself	Top Female Country Artist	Nominated	
Billboard Women in Music	2015	Herself	Rising Star	Won	
Country Music Association Awards	2015	Herself	Female Vocalist of the Year	Nominated	
Country Music Association Awards	2015	Herself	New Artist of the Year	Nominated	
Country Music Association Awards	2016	Herself	Female Vocalist of the Year	Nominated	
Country Music Association Awards	2016	Herself	New Artist of the Year	Nominated	
Country Music Association Awards	2017	Herself	Female Vocalist of the Year	Nominated	
Country Music Association Awards	2018	Herself	Female Vocalist of the Year	Nominated	
Country Music Association Awards	2019	Herself	Female Vocalist of the Year	Nominated	
Country Music Association Awards	2021	"Half of My Hometown" (with Kenny Chesney)	Musical Event of the Year	Won	
Country Music Association Awards	2021	"Half of My Hometown" (with Kenny Chesney)	Video of the Year	Won	
Country Music Association Awards	2022	"Half of My Hometown" (with Kenny Chesney)	Single of the Year	Nominated	
Country Music Association Awards	2023	Herself	Female Vocalist of the Year	Nominated	
Country Music Association Awards	2023	Rolling Up the Welcome Mat	Album of the Year	Nominated	
Country Music Association Awards	2024	Herself	Female Vocalist of the Year	Nominated	
Country Music Association Awards	2024	"Cowboys Cry Too"	Musical Event of the Year	Nominated	
Country Music Association Awards	2025	Herself	Female Vocalist of the Year	Nominated	
CMT Music Awards	2015	"Love Me Like You Mean It"	Breakthrough Video of the Year	Nominated	
CMT Music Awards	2017	"Peter Pan"	Video of the Year	Nominated	
CMT Music Awards	2017	"Peter Pan"	Female Video of the Year	Nominated	
CMT Music Awards	2017	"You're Still the One", "Any Man of Mine", and "Man! I Feel Like a Woman!" (with Meghan Trainor and Jill Scott)	CMT Performance of the Year	Nominated	
CMT Music Awards	2017	Herself	Social Superstar of the Year	Nominated	
CMT Music Awards	2019	"Miss Me More"	Video of the Year	Nominated	
CMT Music Awards	2019	"Miss Me More"	Female Video of the Year	Nominated	
CMT Music Awards	2020	"Homecoming Queen?"	Video of the Year	Nominated	
CMT Music Awards	2020	"Homecoming Queen?"	Female Video of the Year	Nominated	
CMT Music Awards	2020	"Graveyard"	CMT Performance of the Year	Nominated	
CMT Music Awards	2021	"Hole in the Bottle"	Video of the Year	Nominated	
CMT Music Awards	2021	"Hole in the Bottle"	Female Video of the Year	Nominated	
CMT Music Awards	2021	"The Other Girl" (with Halsey)	CMT Performance of the Year	Won	
CMT Music Awards	2022	"Half of My Hometown" (with Kenny Chesney)	Video of the Year	Nominated	
CMT Music Awards	2022	"Half of My Hometown" (with Kenny Chesney)	Collaborative Video of the Year	Nominated	
CMT Music Awards	2022	"I Quit Drinking" (with Paul Klein)	CMT Performance of the Year	Nominated	
CMT Music Awards	2024	"If You Go Down (I'm Goin' Down Too)"	Video of the Year	Nominated	
CMT Music Awards	2024	"Penthouse"	Female Video of the Year	Nominated	
CMT Music Awards	2024	"If You Go Down (I'm Goin' Down Too)" (live from 2023 CMT Music Awards)	CMT Performance of the Year	Nominated	
Grammy Awards	2017	Herself	Best New Artist	Nominated	
Grammy Awards	2019	Unapologetically	Best Country Album	Nominated	
Grammy Awards	2023	"Heartfirst"	Best Country Solo Performance	Nominated	
Grammy Awards	2024	Rolling Up the Welcome Mat	Best Country Album	Nominated	
Grammy Awards	2025	"Cowboys Cry Too" (with Noah Kahan)	Best Country Duo/Group Performance	Nominated	
Grammy Awards	2026	Patterns	Best Contemporary Country Album	Nominated	
Grammy Awards	2027	Mount Pleasant	Best Contemporary Country Album	Pending	
Kids' Choice Awards	2017	Herself	Favorite New Artist	Nominated	
iHeartRadio Music Awards	2017	Herself	Best New Artist	Won	
iHeartRadio Music Awards	2017	Herself	Best New Country Artist	Won	
iHeartRadio Music Awards	2023	"Half of My Hometown" (with Kenny Chesney)	Best Collaboration	Nominated	
iHeartRadio Music Awards	2023	"Half of My Hometown" (with Kenny Chesney)	Country Song of the Year	Nominated	
New Music Awards	2024	Herself	Country Female Artist of the Year	Nominated	
New Music Awards	2024	"If You Go Down (I'm Goin' Down Too)"	Country Song of the Year	Nominated	
People's Choice Awards	2017	Herself	Favorite Country Female Artist of the Year	Nominated	
People's Choice Awards	2019	Herself	Country Artist of the Year	Nominated	
People's Choice Awards	2020	Herself	Country Artist of the Year	Nominated	
People's Choice Awards	2022	Herself	Country Artist of the Year	Nominated	
People's Choice Awards	2024	Herself	Country Artist of the Year	Nominated	
People's Choice Country Awards	2023	Herself	The People's Artist of the Year	Nominated	
People's Choice Country Awards	2023	Herself	The Female Artist of the Year	Nominated	
People's Choice Country Awards	2023	Herself	The Social Country Star of the Year	Nominated	
People's Choice Country Awards	2023	Rolling Up the Welcome Mat	The Album of the Year	Nominated	
People's Choice Country Awards	2024	Herself	The Female Artist of the Year	Nominated	
People's Choice Country Awards	2024	"Cowboys Cry Too"	The Crossover Song of 2024	Nominated	
People's Choice Country Awards	2024	"Sorry Mom"	The Storyteller Song of 2024	Nominated	
Radio Disney Music Awards	2017	Herself	Breakout Artist of the Year	Nominated	
Radio Disney Music Awards	2017	Herself	Country Favorite Artist	Won	
Radio Disney Music Awards	2017	"Peter Pan"	Country Favorite Song	Won	
Radio Disney Music Awards	2017	"Yeah Boy"	Best Crush Song	Nominated	
Radio Disney Music Awards	2018	Herself	Country Favorite Artist	Won	
Radio Disney Music Awards	2018	"Legends"	Country Favorite Song	Won	
Teen Choice Awards	2016	Herself	Choice Music: Country Artist	Nominated	
Teen Choice Awards	2016	"Peter Pan"	Choice Music: Country Song	Nominated	
Teen Choice Awards	2017	Herself	Choice Country Artist	Nominated	
Teen Choice Awards	2019	Herself	Choice Country Artist	Nominated	
Teen Choice Awards	2019	"Miss Me More"	Choice Country Song	Nominated	

== Tours ==
=== Headlining ===
- The First Time Tour (2016)
- The Unapologetically Tour (2018)
- The Miss Me More Tour (2019)
- Heartfirst Tour (2022–2023)
- Live on Tour (2025)

=== Supporting ===
- Wheels Up Tour (with Lady A; 2015)
- Just the Right Kind of Crazy Tour (with Dan + Shay; 2015)
- Rhythm and Roots Tour (with Rascal Flatts; 2016)
- Home Team Tour (with Thomas Rhett; 2017)
- You Look Good World Tour (with Lady A; 2017)
- Graffiti U World Tour (with Keith Urban; 2018)
- Meaning of Life Tour (with Kelly Clarkson; 2019)
- Remember This Tour (with Jonas Brothers; 2021)
- The Final Tour (with the Judds; 2023)
- I Go Back Tour (with Kenny Chesney; 2023)

== Television appearances ==
Year	Title	Role	Notes
2015	Southern Charm	Herself	Performed and bid on cast member Craig Conover during date auction
2016	Greatest Hits	Herself and co-host	Co-hosted with Arsenio Hall
2016	CMC Awards 2016	Herself and co-host	Alongside Morgan Evans
2017–2019	CMA Music Festival: Country's Night to Rock	Herself and co-host	Alongside Thomas Rhett
2018	The Voice	Herself	The Comeback Stage Coach
2018	Victoria's Secret Fashion Show	Herself and performer	Television special
2018	Hell's Kitchen	Herself	VIP guest diner at the Red Team's chef's table; Episode: "Hot Potato"
2019	The Voice	Herself	Team Kelly Battle Advisor
2019	Songland	Herself	Episode: "Kelsea Ballerini"
2019	Trisha's Southern Kitchen	Herself	Episode: "A Southern Heart-to-Heart with Kelsea Ballerini"
2019	Brad Paisley Thinks He's Special	Herself and guest	Alongside Brad Paisley, Jonas Brothers, Hootie & the Blowfish, Tim McGraw, Kimberly Williams-Paisley, Carrie Underwood
2020	CMT Crossroads	Herself	Alongside Halsey
2020	#KidsTogether: The Nickelodeon Town Hall	Herself	Television special
2021	The Voice	Herself and guest coach	Subbing in for Kelly Clarkson who was under the weather during The Battles
2021	Sesame Street	Herself	Season 51 Episode 32: "Family Day"
2021–2024	CMT Music Awards	Herself and host	2021, 2023 co-host with Kane Brown, 2022 co-host with Brown and Anthony Mackie, 2024 solo host
2023	Saturday Night Live	Herself and musical guest	Episode: "Travis Kelce/Kelsea Ballerini"
2023	That's My Jam	Herself and musical guest	Episode: "Jason Derulo & Nicole Scherzinger vs. Kelsea Ballerini & Julia Michaels"
2023	Superfan	Herself	Episode: "Kelsea Ballerini"
2024	RuPaul's Drag Race	Herself and guest Judge	Episode: "Drag Race Vegas Live! Makeovers"
2024	Doctor Odyssey	Lisa	Episode: "I Always Cry at Weddings"
2025	The Voice	Herself and coach	Season 27

== Bibliography ==
- Ballerini, Kelsea (2021). Feel Your Way Through: A Book of Poetry. Ballantine Books
