= Half of My Hometown =

2021 single by Kelsea Ballerini

Single by Kelsea Ballerini featuring Kenny Chesney

from the album Kelsea
- Released: April 19, 2021
- Genre: Country
- Length: 3:52
- Label: Black River
- Songwriters: Kelsea Ballerini; Ross Copperman; Nicolle Galyon; Shane McAnally; Jimmy Robbins
- Producers: Kelsea Ballerini; Jimmy Robbins; Ross Copperman

Kelsea Ballerini singles chronology
"Hole in the Bottle" (2020)	"Half of My Hometown" (2021)	"I Quit Drinking" (2021)

Kenny Chesney singles chronology
"Knowing You" (2021)	"Half of My Hometown" (2021)	"Everyone She Knows" (2022)

Music video
- "Half of My Hometown" on YouTube

"Half of My Hometown" (stylized in all lowercase) is a song by American singers Kelsea Ballerini and Kenny Chesney. It was released to country radio on April 19, 2021, as the fourth single from Ballerini's third studio album, Kelsea. Ballerini co-wrote the song with Ross Copperman, Nicolle Galyon, Shane McAnally, and Jimmy Robbins.

"Half of My Hometown" won both Musical Event of the Year and Video of the Year at the 55th Annual Country Music Association Awards and was nominated for Single of the Year at the 56th CMA Awards. An alternate recording of the song is also included on Ballerini's first remix album, Ballerini.

== Composition ==
Co-written with Ross Copperman, Nicolle Galyon, Shane McAnally, and Jimmy Robbins, "Half of My Hometown" describes the conflicting emotions of a person who feels conflict between staying in their hometown, or leaving it in favor of an improvement. Ballerini recorded vocals for this song immediately after writing it and some demo vocals were retained in the final edit. The song makes references to Knoxville, Tennessee—the hometown of both artists—inspiring the decision to enlist Chesney to feature on the track. Chesney said he "couldn't say 'yes' fast enough" after hearing the song.

== Release and promotion ==
Ballerini and Chesney performed "Half of My Hometown" together at the 56th Academy of Country Music Awards on April 18, 2021, one day before the song's release. The performance served as the single's live debut. Ballerini performed during the live finale part 2 of The Voice program season 20, while Kenzie Wheeler performed Chesney's vocals of the song.

Released to country radio on April 19, 2021, "Half of My Hometown" serves as the fourth single of Ballerini's third studio album, Kelsea. The song's alternate version was later included on her first remix album, Ballerini.

== Music video ==
The video was directed by Patrick Tracy. It features Kelsea picturing an alternate life where she stayed in Knoxville, Tennessee instead of pursuing her dream as a country star interspersed with clips of her performance of the song with Chesney at the ACM Awards.

== Critical reception ==
In reviews for Kelsea, AllMusic's Stephen Thomas Erlewine wrote that Chesney's inclusion on the song "seems designed to reinforce [Ballerini's] country roots", while Jonathan Bernstein of Rolling Stone labelled the song a "heartwarming acoustic anthem". Cillea Houghton of Sounds Like Nashville wrote that "the starlet takes on a more serious tone with the observational 'half of my hometown'", calling the song "a standout moment" on the album.

== Accolades ==
Year	Ceremony	Category / Nominated Work	Result	Ref.
2021	55th Annual Country Music Association Awards	Musical Event of the Year	Won	
2021	55th Annual Country Music Association Awards	Video of the Year	Won	
2021	57th Academy of Country Music Awards	Music Event of the Year	Nominated	
2022	56th Annual Country Music Association Awards	Single of the Year	Nominated	

== Charts ==
=== Weekly charts ===
Weekly chart performance
Chart (2021–2022)	Peak position
Canada Country (Billboard)	13
US Billboard Hot 100	53
US Country Airplay (Billboard)	1
US Hot Country Songs (Billboard)	11

=== Year-end charts ===
2021 year-end chart performance
Chart (2021)	Position
US Hot Country Songs (Billboard)	66

2022 year-end chart performance
Chart (2022)	Position
US Country Airplay (Billboard)	33
US Hot Country Songs (Billboard)	50
US Radio Songs (Billboard)	64

== Certifications ==
Certifications and sales
Region	Certification	Certified units/sales
Australia (ARIA)	Gold	35,000^{‡}
Canada (Music Canada)	Gold	40,000^{‡}
United States (RIAA)	Platinum	1,000,000^{‡}
^{‡} Sales+streaming figures based on certification alone.
