= Homecoming Queen? =

Single by Kelsea Ballerini

from the album Kelsea
- B-side: "Research Hook"
- Written: February 2019
- Released: September 6, 2019
- Genre: Country
- Length: 2:47
- Label: Black River
- Songwriters: Kelsea Ballerini; Jimmy Robbins; Nicolle Galyon
- Producers: Kelsea Ballerini; Jimmy Robbins

Kelsea Ballerini singles chronology
"Miss Me More" (2018)	"Homecoming Queen?" (2019)	"The Other Girl" (2020)

Music video
- "Homecoming Queen?" on YouTube

"Homecoming Queen?" (stylized in all lowercase) is a song by American singer Kelsea Ballerini. It was released through Black River Entertainment on September 6, 2019, as the lead single from her third studio album, Kelsea (2020). Written and produced by Ballerini and Jimmy Robbins with additional writing from Nicolle Galyon, the country ballad explores vulnerability beneath an outwardly perfect image through the metaphor of a homecoming queen.

"Homecoming Queen?" was noted for its emotional honesty and stripped-back acoustic arrangement, although some felt the song's delivery did not fully realize its intended message. Commercially, it reached the top 20 of the Hot Country Songs and Country Airplay charts in the United States, was certified platinum by Music Canada and the Recording Industry Association of America (RIAA), and received a gold certification from the Australian Recording Industry Association (ARIA).

== Background and release ==
According to Ballerini, "Homecoming Queen?" was inspired by a period in which she felt "really insecure" despite appearing confident to others. She said that the song encourages listeners to "be yourself" and acknowledge their emotions rather than feeling pressured to appear perfect. Written with Jimmy Robbins and Nicolle Galyon during a songwriting retreat in February 2019, the song originated after Galyon suggested the title "Homecoming Queen" as a metaphor for people presenting only their "best selves", according to Ballerini. She then developed the central lyric, "Even the homecoming queen cries", describing the writing session as feeling like "a therapy session".

Ballerini described "Homecoming Queen?" as her "most emotional" single to date and said it was about "zipping up the mess". Explaining the title, she said that although she had never been a homecoming queen herself, the phrase serves as a metaphor for someone who appears "polished from the outside looking in". In an interview with The Tennessean, Ballerini revealed that "Homecoming Queen?" heralded "a new, more emotionally vulnerable phase of her career", focusing on stripped down musical production and songwriting.

Ahead of its release, Ballerini revealed details about "Homecoming Queen?" during a question-and-answer session on Twitter on September 3. Three days later, the song was released to digital by Black River Entertainment, serving as the lead single of her third studio album, Kelsea (2020). The compact disc features "Research Hook" as a B-side track. The alternative version of "Homecoming Queen" was later included in Ballerini's first remix album, Ballerini (2020).

== Composition and reception ==
Ballerini co-wrote the song with Robbins and Galyon. Robbins produced and recorded the track, while Dan Grech-Marguerat handled mixing and additional programming. Charles Haydon Hicks and Luke Burgoyne served as assistant mixing engineers. The song was mastered by Dave Kutch, and Mike "Frog" Griffith was the production coordinator.

A country ballad, "Homecoming Queen?" is a gentle, predominantly acoustic track. As noted by Rolling Stone's Jon Freeman, its lyrics explore the emotional struggles hidden beneath an outwardly perfect image, encouraging the song's "titular character" to embrace vulnerability instead of masking her feelings. Billy Dukes of Taste of Country similarly interpreted the song as centering on someone who appears to "have it all together" while concealing inner pain, highlighting its "confessional" lyrics and "stripped-down acoustic guitar" arrangement.

Justin Cober-Lake of Spectrum Culture viewed "Homecoming Queen?" as one of Kelsea's "biggest missteps". Although he praised its concept of exploring vulnerability behind a carefully maintained façade, he felt that Ballerini's performance sounded "interrogat[ive] rather than demonstrat[ive]", arguing that her delivery occasionally undermined the song's intended empathy.

== Commercial performance ==
"Homecoming Queen?" debuted at number 82 on the US Billboard Hot 100 on the week of September 21, 2019, before leaving the next week. It re-appeared at number 89 on the week of November 23 and reached number 83 until the week after. After re-entering at number 87 on the week of January 11, 2020, it reached number 76 on the week of February 8 and peaked at number 65 on the week of April 4, staying on the chart for 13 weeks. It has sold 70,000 copies in the United States as of February 2020, and was certified platinum by the Recording Industry Association of America (RIAA) on May 13.

"Homecoming Queen?" peaked at number 14 on the US Hot Country Songs and number 17 on the US Country Airplay charts, while reaching number 64 on the US Rolling Stone Top 100 chart. Internationally, the song peaked at number 15 on the Billboard Canada Country chart and number 34 on the Canada All-Format chart, as well as number 33 on New Zealand's Hot Singles chart. It also reached number 40 on the Canadian Digital Song Sales chart. On the year-end Billboard charts, the song ranked at number 88 on the 2019 Hot Country Songs chart before placing at numbers 44 and 58 on the 2020 Hot Country Songs and Country Airplay year-end charts, respectively. It was later certified platinum by Music Canada and gold by the Australian Recording Industry Association (ARIA).

== Music video ==
The music video for "Homecoming Queen?" was directed by Shane Drake and premiered on September 6, 2019. It features Ballerini seated in a chair as the camera circles around her. Throughout the video, she alternates between a glamorous appearance—wearing a bright pink outfit with matching boots and lipstick—and a more natural look in gray sweats without makeup. The clip concludes with Ballerini breaking down in tears.

Ballerini later said the video's cinematography was achieved through a series of practical changes made between takes as the camera revolved around her, with elements of the set and her appearance gradually changing. She also revealed that the tears in the closing scene were genuine, explaining that Drake had encouraged her to revisit the emotions that inspired the song.

== Live performance ==
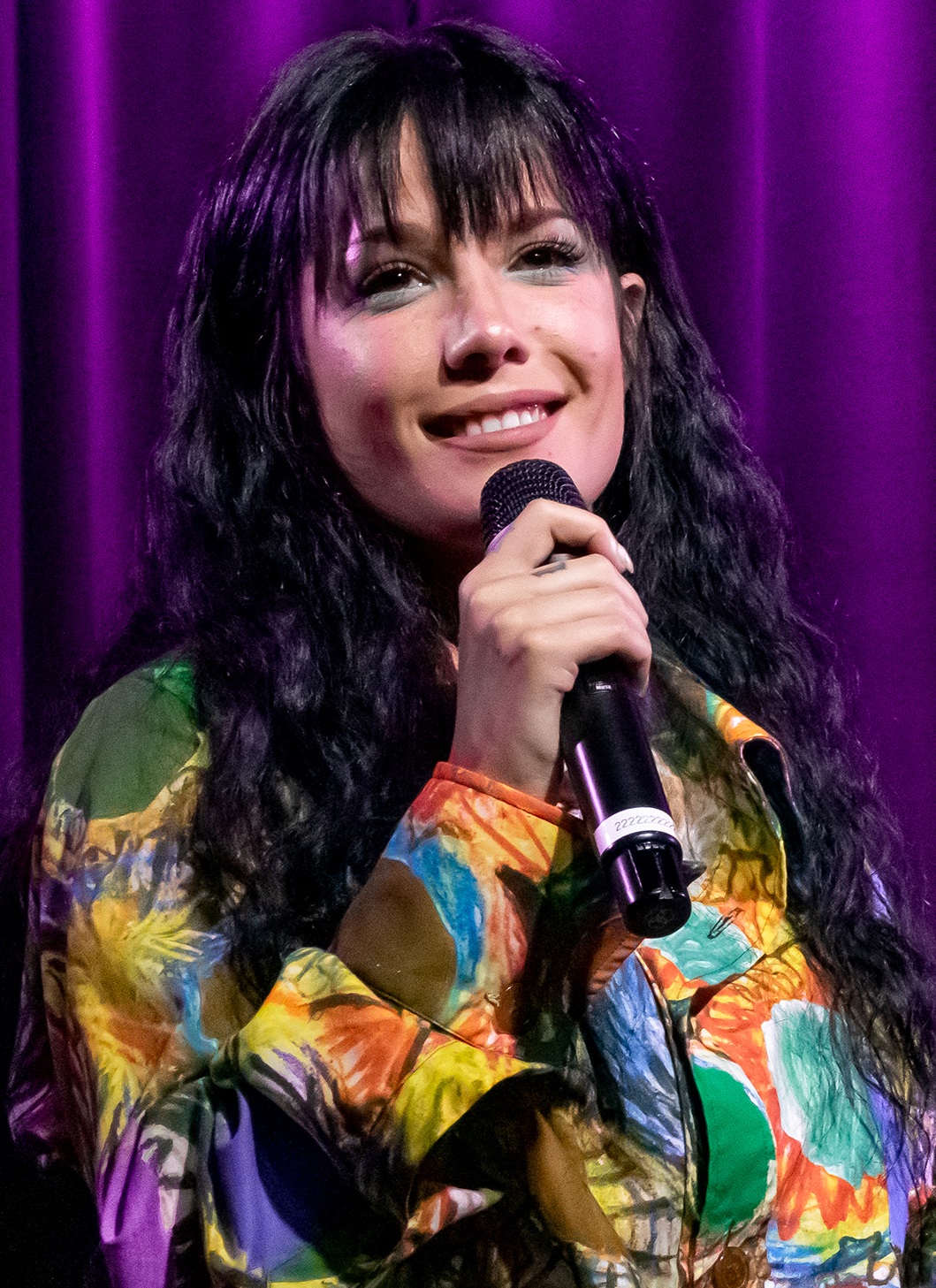
Halsey (pictured in 2019) performed "Homecoming Queen?" with Ballerini on CMT Crossroads in 2019 and 2020.

On October 11, 2019, Ballerini performed "Homecoming Queen?" with American singer Halsey during the taping of the 70th episode of CMT Crossroads at Ascend Amphitheater in Nashville. She then performed it at Listening Room in Nashville six days later and at the 53rd Annual Country Music Association Awards on November 13. Introduced as part of the ceremony before transitioning into an all-star rendition of Little Big Town's "Girl Crush", it was highlighted by Jason Lipshutz of Billboard for its "nuanced" delivery, while The Boot staff depicted the performance as "simple and stunning". On December 31, she played the song at Dick Clark's New Year's Rockin' Eve with Ryan Seacrest.

Ballerini performed "Homecoming Queen?" on Jimmy Kimmel Live on February 6, 2020, and on CMT Crossroads as a duet with Halsey again on March 25. During the performance on ACM Presents: Our Country on April 5, she acknowledged that the event was taking place during the COVID-19 pandemic. In 2025, Ballerini played "Homecoming Queen?" as part of her tour at Amalie Arena in Tampa Bay as a duet with a singer from her team on season 27 of The Voice, Angie Rey. That duet came 19 days after they had performed a duet on the song "Penthouse" during the season premiere on February 3, 2025.

== Personnel ==
Credits were adapted from Tidal.

- Kelsea Ballerini – vocals, songwriter
- Jimmy Robbins – producer, recording engineer, songwriter
- Nicolle Galyon – songwriter
- Dan Grech-Marguerat – mixing engineer, additional programming
- Charles Haydon Hicks – assistant mixing engineer
- Luke Burgoyne – assistant mixing engineer
- Dave Kutch – mastering engineer
- Mike "Frog" Griffith – production coordinator

== Charts ==
=== Weekly charts ===
Weekly chart performance
Chart (2019–2020)	Peak position
Canada All-Format (Billboard)	34
Canada Country (Billboard)	15
Canadian Digital Song Sales (Billboard)	40
New Zealand Hot Singles (RMNZ)	33
US Billboard Hot 100	65
US Country Airplay (Billboard)	17
US Hot Country Songs (Billboard)	14
US Rolling Stone Top 100	64

=== Year-end charts ===
2019 year-end chart performance
Chart (2019)	Position
US Hot Country Songs (Billboard)	88

2020 year-end chart performance
Chart (2020)	Position
US Country Airplay (Billboard)	58
US Hot Country Songs (Billboard)	44

== Certifications ==
Certifications
Region	Certification	Certified units/sales
Australia (ARIA)	Gold	35,000^{‡}
Canada (Music Canada)	Platinum	80,000^{‡}
United States (RIAA)	Platinum	1,000,000^{‡}
^{‡} Sales+streaming figures based on certification alone.
