= Black River Entertainment =

American record label

- Founded: 2007
- Founder: Jimmy Nichols; Tonya Cochran Ginnetti; Terry Pegula; Kim Pegula
- Distributor: The Orchard
- Genre: Country
- Country of origin: U.S.
- Location: Nashville, Tennessee (studios); Buffalo, New York (corporate offices)
- Official website: blackriverent.com

Black River Entertainment is an independent record label in Nashville specializing in country music. The company is partially owned by Terry Pegula. The label’s roster includes Kelsea Ballerini and she is the label's flagship artist. The company contains Black River Publishing and Sound Stage Studio, both in Nashville.

== Background ==
Black River Entertainment was started in late 2007 by Nashville session musician Jimmy Nichols (James Ginnetti), his wife Tonya Cochran Ginnetti, and Terry and Kim Pegula. Black River's first signing was former RCA recording artist, Jeff Bates, who previously had three songs in the Billboard top 40 Nichols, the label president along with Kenny Beard and Mickey Jack Cones) produced Bates' self-titled album which was released in April 2008.

During preparation for Bates' release, Black River began searching for a second artist. Singer/songwriter Sarah Darling was discovered via her MySpace music page. Darling had become known to a certain extent as a finalist on E!s reality show The Entertainer, hosted by Wayne Newton. The label signed Darling and began in the summer of 2008 to record her debut album, Every Monday Morning (released on June 16, 2009). Her single, "Jack of Hearts" made a successful debut on CMT's top 20 countdown. Darling's first top-40 country hit (and the label's second), "Home to Me," peaked in fall 2012, however she soon left the label.

After having success with its two artists, BRE signed Emma Jacob in February 2009. Nichols produced her album, along with her manager, Lex Lipsitz, who manages Kate & Kacey. Black River mostly records in "Ronnie's Place", a studio in their building in Nashville. It was previously owned by Ronnie Milsap and the name is in tribute to him. Black River signed Craig Morgan in 2011. He has had 15 top-40 singles on the country charts during his career. He had previously been with BNA Records, Broken Bow Records, and Atlantic Records prior to joining Black River. Morgan gave Black River its first single ("This Ole Boy") to reach the Top 40 of Billboard's Hot Country Singles chart. On October 8, 2012, CMT reported that American Idol alumni Kellie Pickler had signed with the label, and was already working with them on her fourth studio album. The Woman I Am came out on November 11, 2013.

In January 2013, Black River Entertainment added The John King Band to the roster. In December 2013, the label signed Kelsea Ballerini to their roster and released her debut single, "Love Me Like You Mean It," in 2014. It served as the lead-off single to her debut album, The First Time, which was released on May 19, 2015. "Love Me Like You Mean It" reached No. 1 on the Billboard Country Airplay chart for the week ending July 4, 2015, giving Black River their first No. 1 hit on the chart and also earning the label the distinction of being the first independent label to have a female artist's debut single on top of the country chart. They are also the first independent label to have a female artist at No. 1 since Taylor Swift's "Ours" led in December 2012.

Ballerini's song "Half of My Hometown," a collaboration with Kenny Chesney, won the Video of the Year and Musical Event of the Year at the 55th Annual Country Music Association Awards in 2021. On April 28, 2023, parent company Pegula Sports & Entertainment announced its dissolution. The move did not change Black River operations, which largely operate in Nashville separate from the sports teams which were PSE's core business. In December 2024, it was announced that Chris Young had signed with Black River after leaving his longtime record label RCA Nashville.

== Artists ==
=== Black River Records ===
- John Cooper Albright
- Kelsea Ballerini
- George Birge
- Matt Stell
- MaRynn Taylor
- Chris Young

==== Former Black River Records artists ====
- Abby Anderson
- Pryor Baird
- Jeff Bates
- Bobby Bones and the Raging Idiots
- Sarah Darling
- Jacob Davis
- Due West
- Ray Fulcher
- Scotty Hasting
- John King
- Ronnie Milsap
- Craig Morgan
- Kellie Pickler
- Josiah Siska
- Glen Templeton

=== Black River Christian ===
- Matty Mullins
- Josh Wilson

==== Former Black River Christian artists ====
- Hannah Kerr
