= Aiden Ross =

Aiden, Aidan or Adin Ross may refer to:

- Adin Ross, American internet personality
- Aidan Ross, New Zealand rugby player
- Aiden Ross (singer), American singer, winner of season 28 of The Voice
