= The Voice (American TV series) season 28 =

The Voice
- Season 28
- Promotional poster featuring coaches Bublé, McEntire, Snoop Dogg, and Horan
- Hosted by: Carson Daly
- Coaches: Michael Bublé; Reba McEntire; Niall Horan; Snoop Dogg
- No. of contestants: 48 artists
- Winner: Aiden Ross
- Winning coach: Niall Horan
- Runner-up: Ralph Edwards
- No. of episodes: 19

Release
- Original network: NBC
- Original release: September 22 – December 16, 2025

Season chronology
- ← Previous; Season 27 Next → Battle of Champions

The twenty-eighth season of the American reality television series The Voice premiered on September 22, 2025, on NBC. The season is hosted by Carson Daly, who has hosted every season of the show. The coaching panel consists of Michael Bublé, who returns for his third consecutive season; Reba McEntire and Snoop Dogg, who return for their fourth and second respective seasons after a one-season hiatus; and Niall Horan, who returns for his third season after last coaching during the twenty-fourth season.

Aiden Ross was named the winner of the season, marking Niall Horan's third and final consecutive win as a coach. Ross' win marks the third time that the first (aired) act to audition would go on to win the entire season, following Todd Tilghman's win in season 18 and Girl Named Tom's win in season 21. Horan became the second coach to win three consecutive seasons as a coach, following Blake Shelton's consecutive wins from seasons 2 to 4; however, Horan did not achieve this in consecutive numerical seasons. Additionally, Horan became the first coach in the history of the show to win their first three seasons.

== Overview ==
=== Development ===
On April 23, 2025, it was announced that Snoop Dogg would return to the panel, after a one-season hiatus, for the twenty-eighth season. On May 12, 2025, NBC announced that The Voice was renewed for a twenty-eighth season to air in the Fall of 2025. The lineup of coaches was revealed on the show's website.

=== Coaches and host ===
Coaches and Host of The Voice Season 28

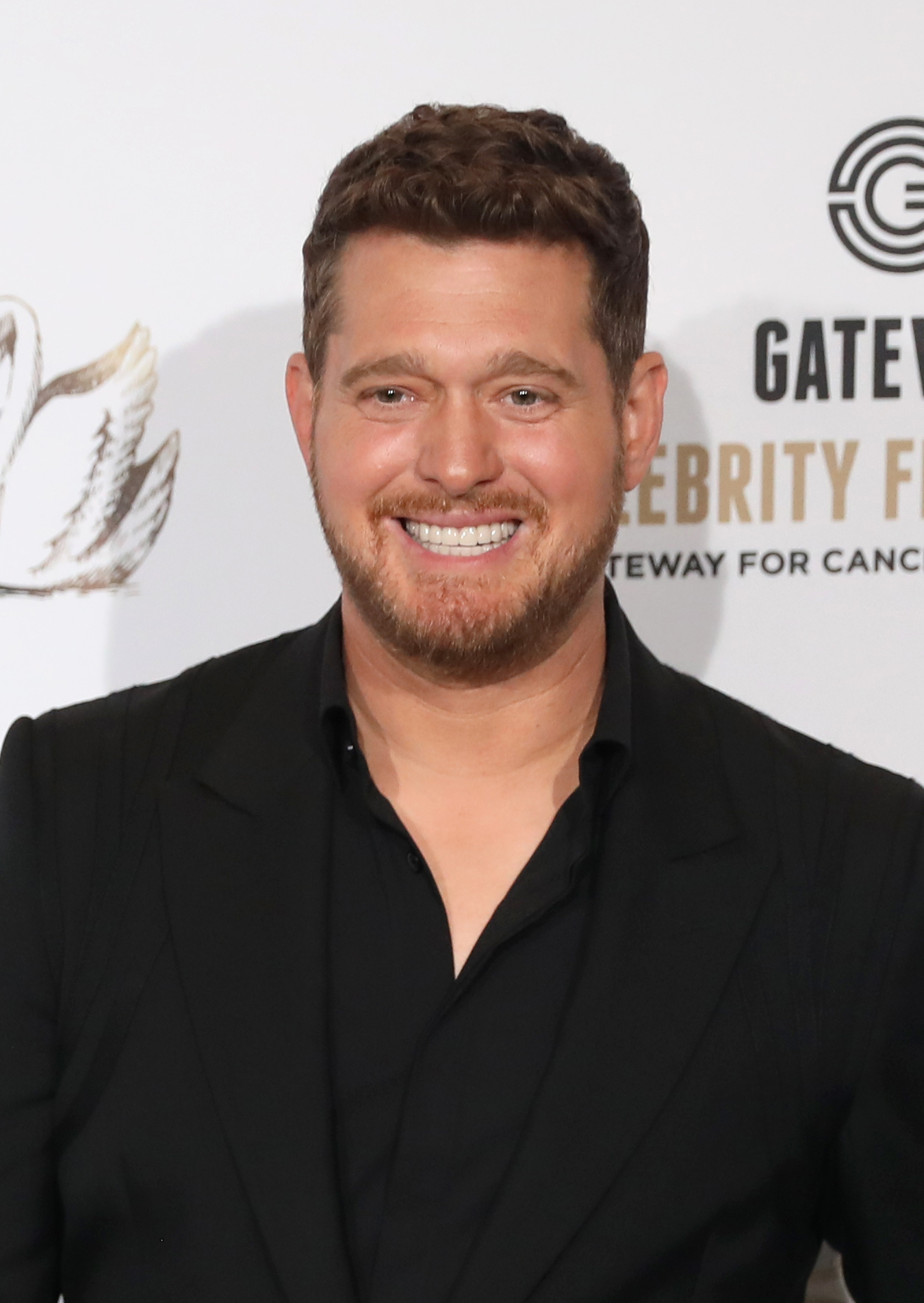
Michael Bublé

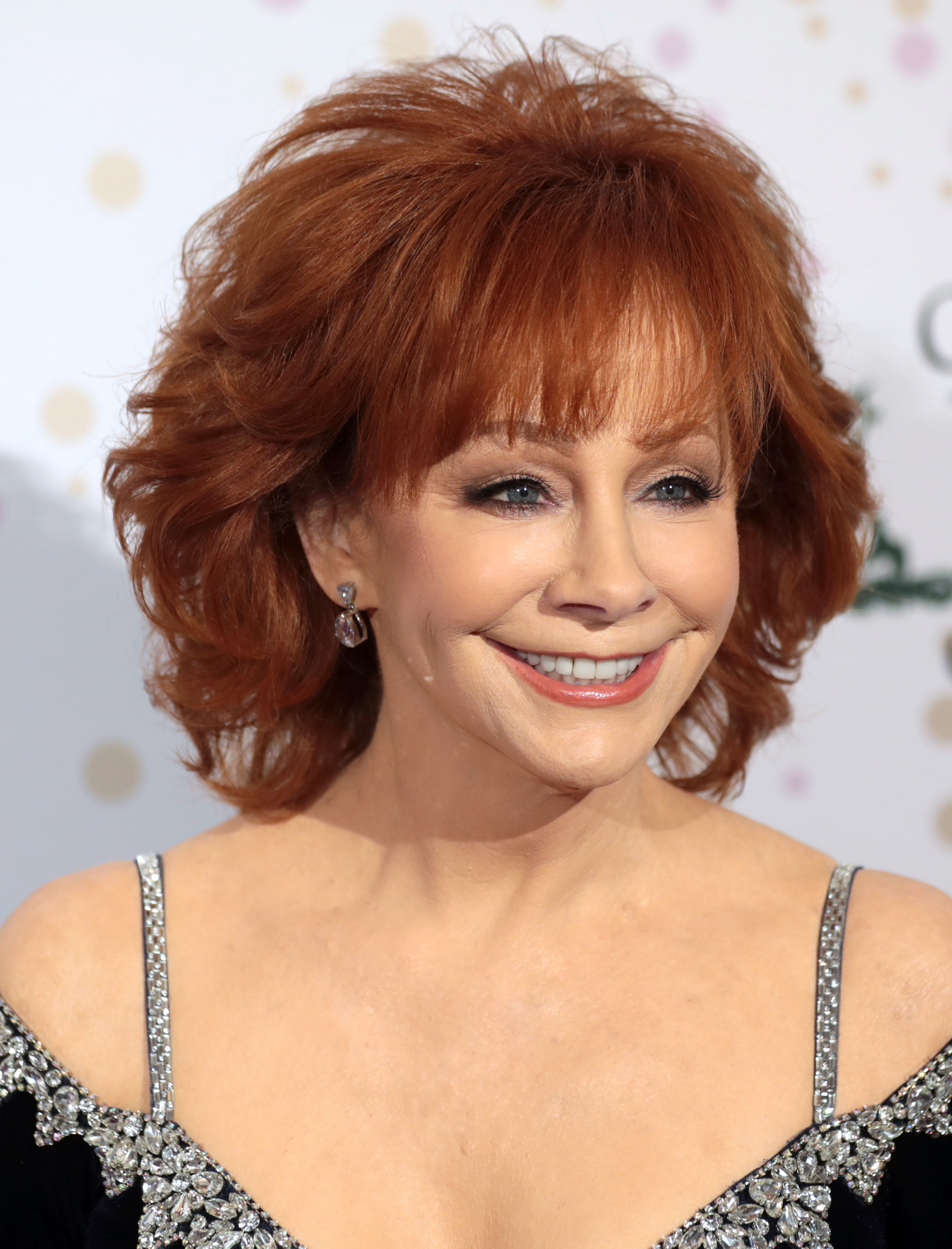
Reba McEntire

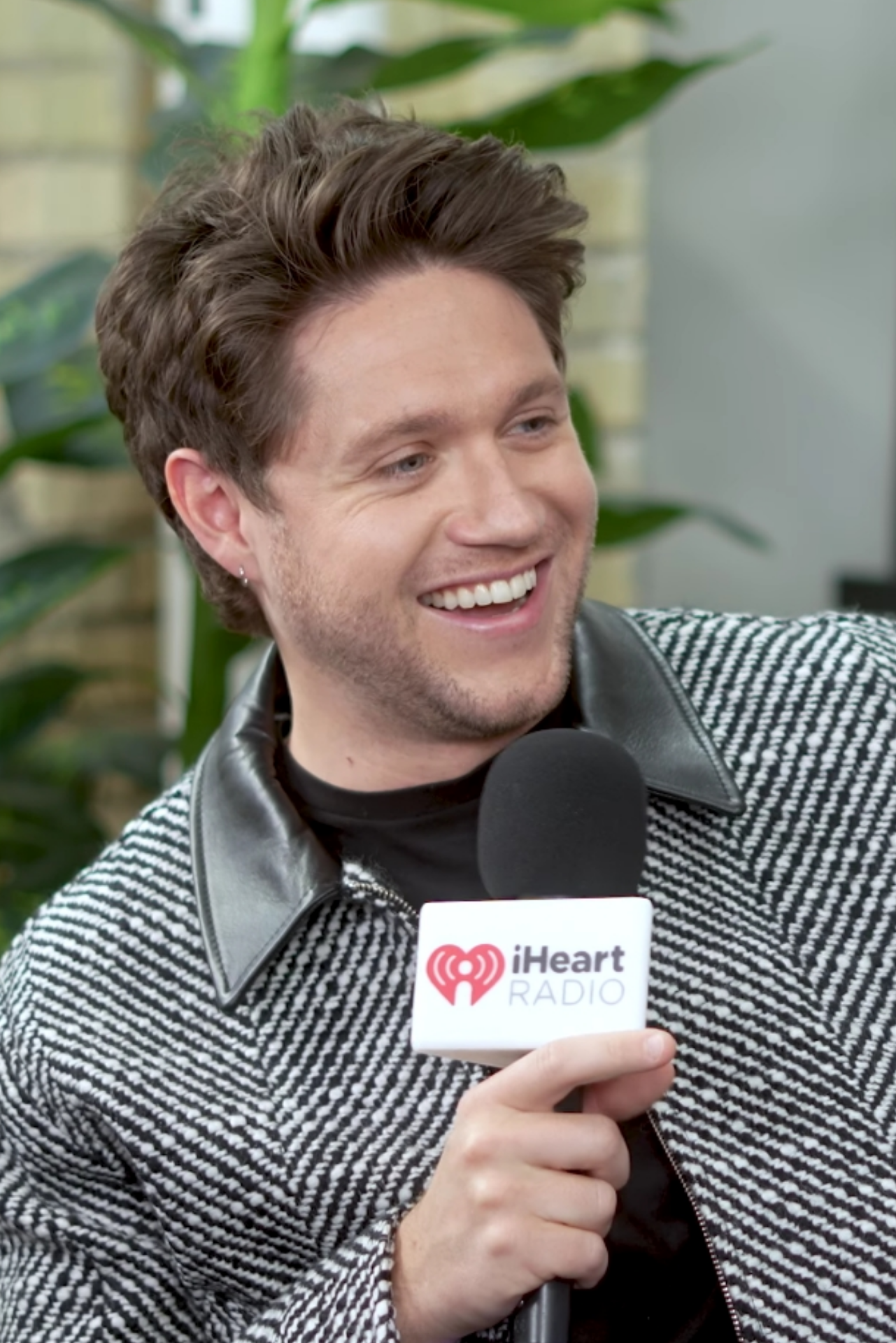
Niall Horan

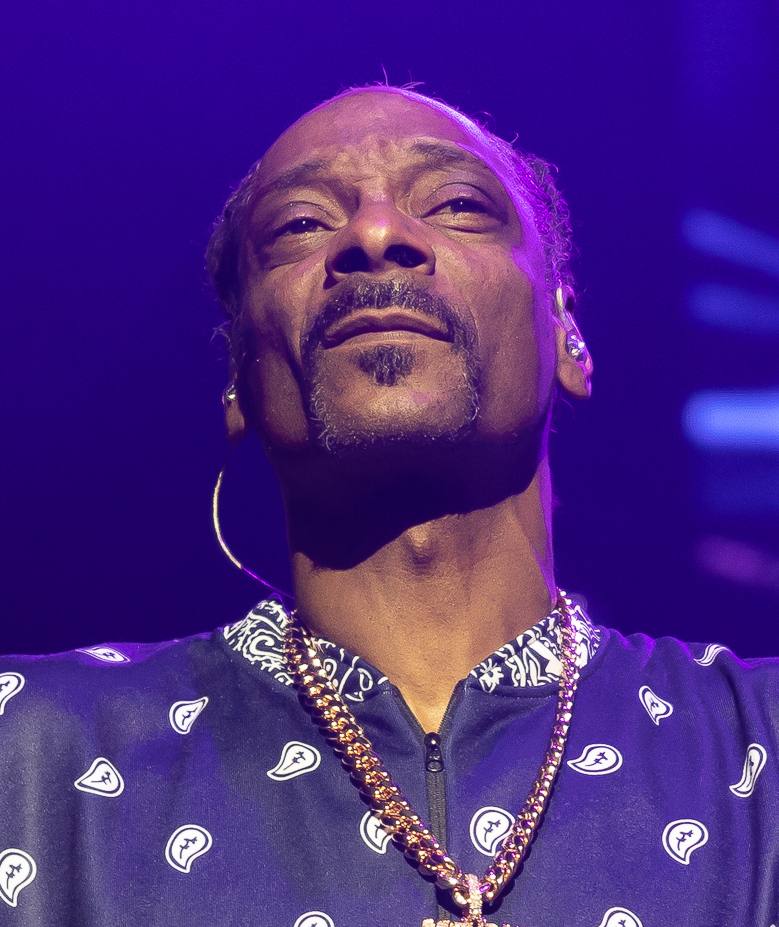
Snoop Dogg

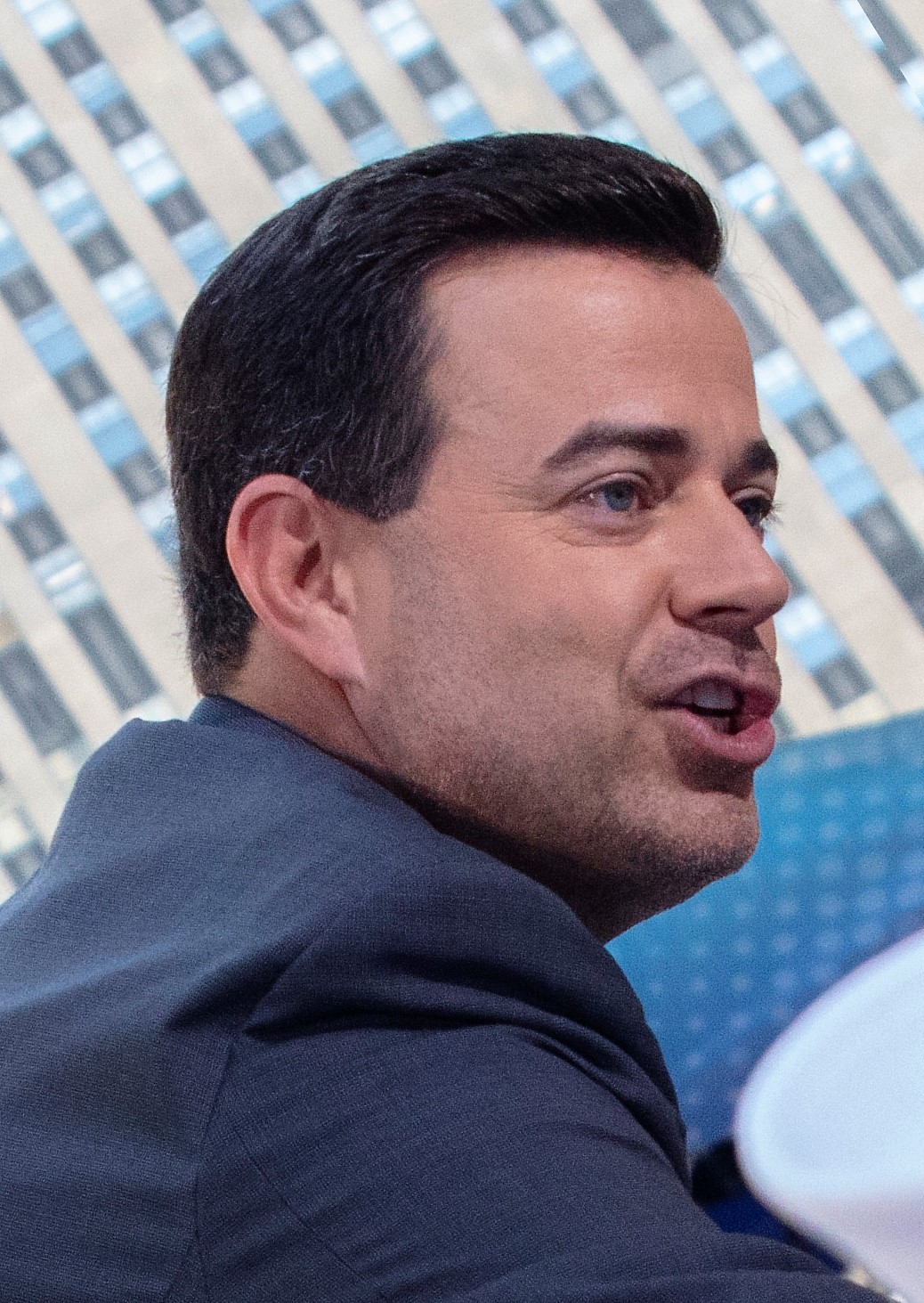
Carson Daly

Of the four coaches from the previous season, only Michael Bublé returned, marking his third consecutive season as a coach. Coaches John Legend, Kelsea Ballerini, and Adam Levine all left the panel. Former coaches Reba McEntire and Snoop Dogg return to the show following their absence in the previous season, marking their fourth and second seasons as a coach, respectively. Former coach Niall Horan also returns to the show after a three-season hiatus, marking his third season on the show as a coach. This season is the first since season 20 in which no new coach is introduced to the panel.

Carson Daly returns for his twenty-eighth consecutive season as host.

=== Battle and knockout advisors ===
The teams' battle advisors were revealed on October 7, 2025, immediately following the end of the blind auditions. The battle advisors for this season are last season's coach Kelsea Ballerini for Team Bublé, former coach Nick Jonas for Team Reba, Lewis Capaldi for Team Niall, and Lizzo for Team Snoop. Ballerini previously advised for Team Kelly in the sixteenth season and Jonas previously advised for Team Christina in the eighth season. On October 20, 2025, it was announced that Zac Brown would serve as a mega mentor for the Knockouts alongside Joe Walsh. Brown mentored Teams Bublé and Snoop, while Walsh was paired with Teams Niall and Reba.

=== Marketing and promotion ===
Ahead of the season's premiere, the show, via its online media platforms, released a cover of the 1973 Steve Miller Band single "The Joker" performed by the coaches.

Shortly prior to the season premiere, the blind audition of Jazz McKenzie, performing Tina Turner's "What's Love Got to Do with It", was released online. Later episodes saw the auditions of Max Cooper III, Cori Kennedy, Toni Lorene, Ava Nat, and Elias Gomez released online as a sneak peek for their respective episodes.

== Teams ==
Teams color key
Winner	Eliminated in the Playoffs
Runner-up	Eliminated in the Knockouts
Third place	Stolen in the Battles
Fourth place	Eliminated in the Battles
Fifth place
Sixth place

Coaches' teams
Coach	Top 48 Artists				
Michael Bublé					
Michael Bublé	Max Chambers	Jazz McKenzie	Rob Cole	Trinity	Jack Austin
Michael Bublé	Max Cooper III	Marty O'Reilly	Teo Ramdel	~~Austin Gilbert~~	Lucas Beltran
Michael Bublé	Aarik Duncan	Elias Gomez	Carly Harvey		
Reba McEntire					
Reba McEntire	Aubrey Nicole	Peyton Kyle	Ryan Mitchell	Aaron Nichols	Austin Gilbert
Reba McEntire	Cori Kennedy	Conrad Khalil	Leyton Robinson	Vinya Chhabra	Manny Costello
Reba McEntire	Daron Lameek	Letter to Elise	Shan Scott		
Niall Horan					
Niall Horan	Aiden Ross	DEK of Hearts	Kirbi	Ava Nat	Kayleigh Clark
Niall Horan	Sadie Dahl	Dustin Dale Gaspard	Liam von Elbe	~~Jack Austin~~	~~Carolina Rodriguez~~
Niall Horan	Alex Brown	Revel Day	Camille Tredoux		
Snoop Dogg					
Snoop Dogg	Ralph Edwards	Toni Lorene	Mindy Miller	Yoshihanaa	Natalia Albertini
Snoop Dogg	Lauren Anderson	Kenny Iko	Carolina Rodriguez	~~Sadie Dahl~~	Jerrell Melton
Snoop Dogg	Makenzie Phipps	Emmanuel Rey	Kanard Thomas		
Note: Italicized names are artists stolen from another team during the battles (names struck through within former teams). Underlined names are artists saved by their coach in the battles. The bold name is the recipient of the "Carson Callback". Double Underlined names are recipients of the 'Mic Drop'.

== Blind auditions ==
The show began with the Blind Auditions on September 22, 2025. In each audition, an artist sings their piece in front of the coaches, whose chairs face the audience. If a coach is interested in working with the artist, they may press their button to face the artist. If only one coach presses the button, the artist automatically becomes part of their team. If multiple coaches turn, they will compete for the artist, who will decide which team they will join. Each coach has one "block" to prevent another coach from getting an artist. This season, each coach ends up with 12 artists by the end of the blind auditions, creating a total of 48 artists advancing to the battles.

This season, a new feature was introduced, dubbed the "Carson Callback." This feature allows Carson Daly to select one artist to audition again after previously failing to make a team.

This is the fifth in The Voice history where at least one coach (Niall Horan in this instance) does not have any one-chair turns on their teams. The others were Adam Levine and Pharrell Williams in season 7, John Legend in season 17, Kelly Clarkson in season 23, and Legend and Horan in season 24. This is also Horan's second consecutive season without a one-chair turn.

Blind auditions color key
✔	Coach hit his/her "I WANT YOU" button
	Artist defaulted to this coach's team
	Artist selected to join this coach's team
	Artist received the "Carson Callback" and was able to audition again later on
	Artist was eliminated with no coach pressing their button
✘	Coach pressed "I WANT YOU" button, but was blocked by another coach from getting the artist
	Blocked by Michael; Blocked by Reba; Blocked by Niall; Blocked by Snoop

=== Episode 1 (September 22) ===
First blind auditions results
Order	Artist	Age(s)	Hometown	Song	Coach's and artist's choices			
Order	Artist	Age(s)	Hometown	Song	Michael	Reba	Niall	Snoop
1	Aiden Ross	20	College Station, Texas	"Love in the Dark"	✔	✔	✔	✔
2	Mindy Miller	35	Damascus, Maryland	"Wildflowers and Wild Horses"	–	✘	–	✔
3	Max Chambers	14	Shreveport, Louisiana	"I Want You Back"	✔	✔	–	–
4	Manny Costello	28	Athens, Georgia	"Almost Home"	–	✔	–	✔
5	Ari B.	30	Detroit, Michigan	"Are You That Somebody?"	–	–	–	–
6	DEK of Hearts (Dylan Kelly, Emily Clapp, and Kollin Bailey)	24–25	Nashville, Tennessee	"Heads Carolina, Tails California"	✔	✔	✔	✔
7	Peyton Kyle	26	Tampa, Florida	"Talking to the Moon"	–	✔	–	–
8	Ralph Edwards	30	Fresno, California	"Lights"	✔	✔	✔	✔
9	Jack Austin	21	Battle Creek, Michigan	"This Town" (Note: Austin and Horan later performed a snippet of the same song after Austin's audition.)	✔	✔	✔	–
10	Ryan Mitchell	25	Los Angeles, California	"Cigarette Daydreams"	–	–	–	–
11	Jazz McKenzie	31	Birmingham, Alabama	"What's Love Got to Do with It"	✔	✔	✔	✘

=== Episode 2 (September 23) ===
Among this episode's auditionees was Ryan Mitchell, who previously auditioned unsuccessfully this season but was allowed another audition from the "Carson Callback".

Second blind auditions results
Order	Artist	Age	Hometown	Song	Coach's and artist's choices			
Order	Artist	Age	Hometown	Song	Michael	Reba	Niall	Snoop
1	Yoshihanaa (Ashton Beauchesne)	36	Sanford, Florida	"Nobody's Supposed to Be Here"	–	✔	✔	✔
2	Lucas Beltran	19	Philadelphia, Pennsylvania / Lima, Peru	"You'll Never Find Another Love Like Mine"	✔	✔	–	–
3	Ryan Mitchell	25	Los Angeles, California	"...Baby One More Time"	–	✔	–	–
4	Carolina Rodriguez	19	Miami, Florida	"Cardigan"	–	–	✔	✔
5	Jacob Ryan Gustafson	35	Yucaipa, California	"Spin You Around"	–	–	–	–
6	Max Cooper III	23	Kansas City, Kansas	"Cooler than Me" (Note: Cooper and Bublé later performed a duet of the song "Haven't Met You Yet" after Cooper’s audition.)	✔	✔	✔	✔

=== Episode 3 (September 29) ===
Among this episode's auditionees was Kayleigh Clark, who previously competed on the twenty-first season of American Idol, and Rob Cole, who previously auditioned unsuccessfully in season 25.

Third blind auditions results
Order	Artist	Age	Hometown	Song	Coach's and artist's choices			
Order	Artist	Age	Hometown	Song	Michael	Reba	Niall	Snoop
1	Cori Kennedy	28	Kasson, Minnesota	"Why Not Me"	✔	✔	–	–
2	Revel Day	31	Altadena, California	"Somewhere Only We Know"	✔	✔	✔	–
3	Natalia Albertini	24	Cherry Hill, New Jersey	"Out Here on My Own"	–	✔	–	✔
4	Marty O'Reilly	36	Sonoma, California	"Trouble"	✔	–	✔	✔
5	J.Blake	35	Memphis, Tennessee	"The Door"	–	–	–	–
6	Kayleigh Clark	20	Sumrall, Mississippi	"Stay"	✔	✔	✔	✔
7	Daron Lameek	35	Queens, New York	"All Night Long (All Night)"	✔	✔	–	–
8	Rob Cole	34	Pembroke, North Carolina	"Joy of My Life"	✔	✘	–	–
9	Justin Jenks	32	Buena Park, California	"Sex and Candy"	–	–	–	–
10	Aarik Duncan	38	Raleigh, North Carolina	"Birds of a Feather"	✔	–	–	–
11	Sadie Dahl	19	Draper, Utah	"Colors"	✘	✔	✔	✔

=== Episode 4 (September 30) ===
Fourth blind auditions results
Order	Artist	Age	Hometown	Song	Coach's and artist's choices			
Order	Artist	Age	Hometown	Song	Michael	Reba	Niall	Snoop
1	Toni Lorene	28	Houston, Texas	"Cuz I Love You"	–	✔	✔	✔
2	Austin Gilbert	25	Eugene, Oregon	"The Kind of Love We Make"	✔	–	✔	–
3	Kenny Iko	35	Washington, D.C.	"Versace on the Floor"	–	–	✔	✔
4	Leyton Robinson	23	Rogers, Arkansas	"Weren't for the Wind"	–	✔	–	✔
5	Liv Ciara	16	St. Peters, Missouri	"Espresso"	–	–	–	–
6	Kirbi (Savanna Kirby)	24	Florence, Alabama	"God Only Knows"	✔	✔	✔	✔

=== Episode 5 (October 6) ===
Among this episode's auditionees was Kanard Thomas, who previously auditioned unsuccessfully on season 16 originally, but was later selected to compete on "The Comeback Stage", where he was coached by Bebe Rexha, and was named the winner. He was subsequently eliminated in the Live Playoffs.

Fifth blind auditions results
Order	Artist	Age	Hometown	Song	Coach's and artist's choices			
Order	Artist	Age	Hometown	Song	Michael	Reba	Niall	Snoop
1	Dustin Dale Gaspard	33	Cow Island, Louisiana	"Bring It On Home to Me"	✔	✔	✔	✔
2	Kanard Thomas	35	Columbus, Georgia	"Whip Appeal"	–	–	✔	✔
3	Shan Scott	28	Highland Falls, New York	"Wish I Knew You"	–	✔	–	–
4	Carly Harvey	39	Washington, D.C.	"It Hurt So Bad"	✔	✔	–	–
5	Colin Bracewell	24	Minneapolis, Minnesota	"More Than a Woman"	–	–	–	–
6	Vinya Chhabra	14	East Brunswick, New Jersey	"Ironic"	✔	✔	–	✔
7	Conrad Khalil	28	Newark, New Jersey	"Caught Up"	–	✔	–	–
8	Liam von Elbe	30	Plattsburgh, New York	"Slow Dancing in a Burning Room"	–	–	✔	✔
9	Lauren Anderson	40	Oak Park, Illinois	"Midnight Train to Memphis"	–	–	–	✔
10	Ava Nat	18	Garden City, New York	"I Love You, I'm Sorry"	–	✔	✔	✔
11	Trevor Hewitt	39	Chesnee, South Carolina	"I Was Wrong"	–	–	–	–
12	Teo Ramdel	34	Tijuana, Mexico	"Historia de un Amor"	✔	✔	✔	✔

=== Episode 6 (October 7) ===
Among this episode's auditionees was Letter to Elise, consisting of Elliott Hunt, who previously auditioned unsuccessfully in season 27, and Myra Tran, who previously won the second season of The X Factor Vietnam and competed on the seventeenth season of American Idol.

Sixth blind auditions results
Order	Artist	Age(s)	Hometown	Song	Coach's and artist's choices			
Order	Artist	Age(s)	Hometown	Song	Michael	Reba	Niall	Snoop
1	Trinity (Trinity Giselle)	25	Stamford, Connecticut	"Don't Let Go (Love)"	✔	✔	✔	✔
2	Letter to Elise (Elliott Hunt and Chris Lillis)	27 & 30	Buffalo, New York	"Take On Me"	–	✔	–	✔
3	Camille Tredoux	26	Johannesburg, South Africa	"Behind Blue Eyes"	–	✔	✔	–
4	Emmanuel Rey	27	Inglewood, California	"Primera Cita"	✔	–	–	✔
5	Myra Tran	26	Santa Ana, California / Ho Chi Minh City, Vietnam	"Symphony"	–	–	–	–
6	Aubrey Nicole	19	Littlestown, Pennsylvania	"Burning House"	–	✔	–	–
7	Aaron Nichols	37	Bakersfield, California	"Cold"	✔	✔	–	✔
8	Jerrell Melton	29	Fayetteville, Georgia	"Go the Distance"	–	Team full	–	✔
9	Elias Gomez	29	Cincinnati, Ohio / Havana, Cuba	"Lonely Teardrops"	✔	Team full	✔	✔
10	Alex Brown	26	New Hope, Alabama	"How Can You Mend a Broken Heart"	Team full	Team full	✔	✔
11	Bullfrog	43	East Milton, Florida	"Soulshine"	Team full	Team full	Team full	–
12	Makenzie Phipps	23	Bluefield, Virginia	"4x4xU"	Team full	Team full	Team full	✔

== Battles ==
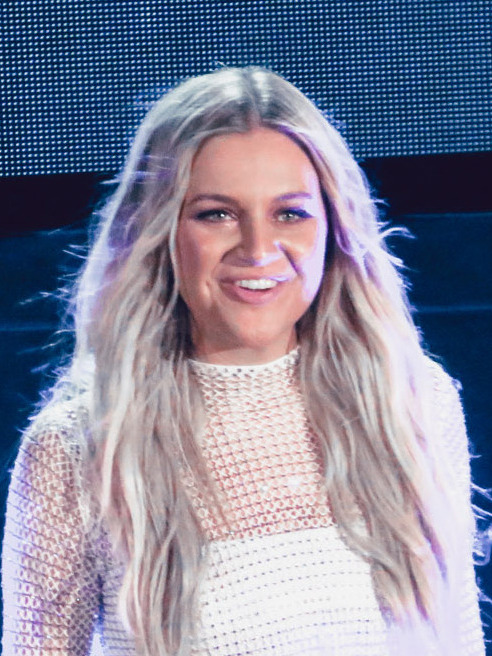
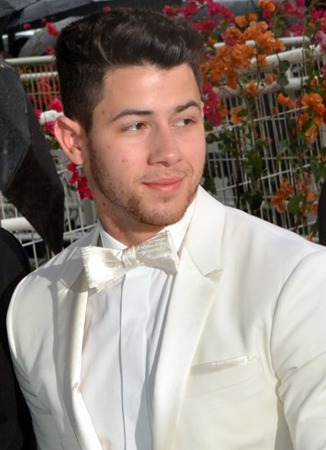
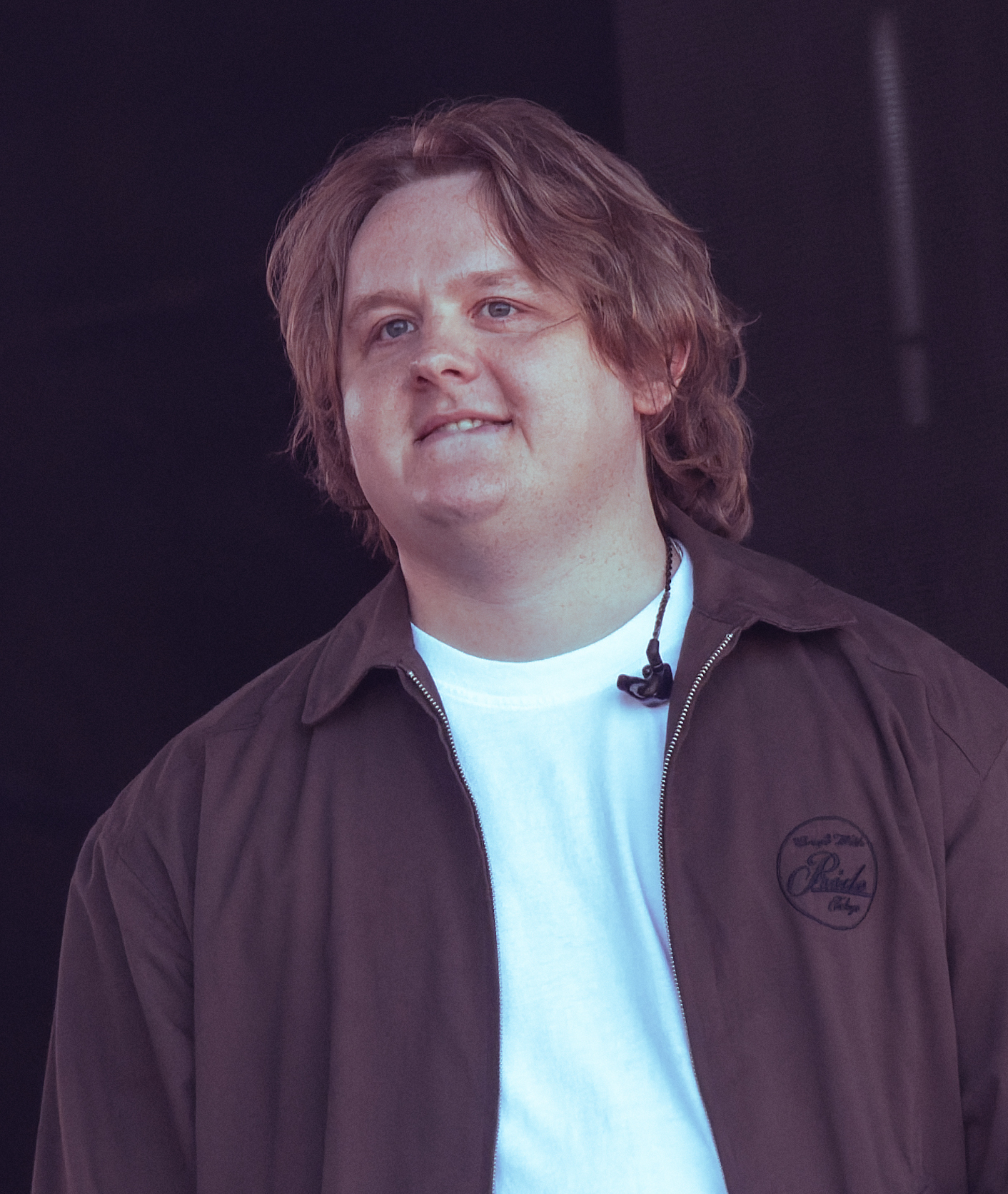
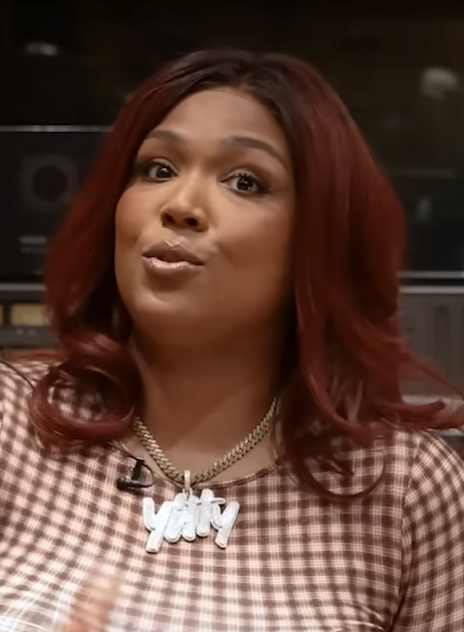
Kelsea Ballerini served as an advisor for Team Bublé, Nick Jonas for Team Reba, Lewis Capaldi for Team Niall, and Lizzo for Team Snoop.

The second stage of the show, the battles, aired from October 13, 2025, to October 27, 2025, consisting of episodes 7 through 10. The advisors for this round were Kelsea Ballerini for Team Bublé, Nick Jonas for Team Reba, Lewis Capaldi for Team Niall, and Lizzo for Team Snoop.

This season, for the first time in the history of the show, the artists on each team pair themselves, rather than each coach making the pairings. Both artists then perform in a singing match where their coach selects one of them to advance to the next round. Losing artists may be "stolen" by another coach, becoming new members of that team, or can be saved by their coach, remaining a part of their original team. Multiple coaches can attempt to steal an artist, resulting in a competition for the artist, who will ultimately decide which team they will go to. Additionally, their original coach can compete for their artist if they attempt to save them.

At the end of this round, eight artists will remain on each team; six will be battle winners, and one from a steal and a save, respectively. In total, 32 artists advance to the knockouts.

Battles color key
Artist won the Battle and advanced to the Knockouts
Artist lost the Battle, but was stolen by another coach, and advanced to the Knockouts
Artist lost the Battle, but was saved by their coach, and advanced to Knockouts
Artist lost the Battle and was eliminated

Battles results
Episode	Coach	Order	Winner	Song	Loser	'Steal'/'Save' result			
Episode	Coach	Order	Winner	Song	Loser	Michael	Reba	Niall	Snoop
Episode 7 (Monday, Oct. 13, 2025)	Snoop	1	Yoshihanaa	"(You Make Me Feel Like) A Natural Woman"	Natalia Albertini	–	–	–	✔
Episode 7 (Monday, Oct. 13, 2025)	Reba	2	Aaron Nichols	"Fooled Around and Fell in Love"	Daron Lameek	–	–	–	–
Episode 7 (Monday, Oct. 13, 2025)	Michael	3	Jazz McKenzie	"Virtual Insanity"	Trinity	✔	✔	✔	✔
Episode 7 (Monday, Oct. 13, 2025)	Niall	4	Dustin Dale Gaspard	"Too Sweet"	Revel Day	–	–	–	–
Episode 7 (Monday, Oct. 13, 2025)	Snoop	5	Kenny Iko	"All the Things (Your Man Won't Do)"	Kanard Thomas	–	–	–	N/A
Episode 7 (Monday, Oct. 13, 2025)	Michael	6	Rob Cole	"Honey Bee"	Austin Gilbert	N/A	✔	–	–
Episode 8 (Tuesday, Oct. 14, 2025)	Reba	1	Ryan Mitchell	"Don't You (Forget About Me)"	Letter to Elise	–	–	–	–
Episode 8 (Tuesday, Oct. 14, 2025)	Snoop	2	Toni Lorene	"Love on the Brain"	Sadie Dahl	–	N/A	✔	N/A
Episode 8 (Tuesday, Oct. 14, 2025)	Michael	3	Max Cooper III	"It's a Beautiful Day"	Lucas Beltran	N/A	N/A	N/A	–
Episode 8 (Tuesday, Oct. 14, 2025)	Niall	4	Kayleigh Clark	"Cowboys Cry Too"	Camille Tredoux	–	N/A	–	–
Episode 8 (Tuesday, Oct. 14, 2025)	Niall	5	Liam von Elbe	"Linger"	Alex Brown	–	N/A	–	–
Episode 8 (Tuesday, Oct. 14, 2025)	Michael	6	Marty O'Reilly	"At This Moment"	Carly Harvey	N/A	N/A	N/A	–
Episode 8 (Tuesday, Oct. 14, 2025)	Reba	7	Cori Kennedy	"Somethin' Bad"	Aubrey Nicole	–	✔	N/A	✔
Episode 9 (Monday, Oct. 20, 2025)	Snoop	1	Lauren Anderson	"Before He Cheats"	Makenzie Phipps	–	Team full	N/A	N/A
Episode 9 (Monday, Oct. 20, 2025)	Michael	2	Max Chambers	"Just the Two of Us"	Aarik Duncan	N/A	Team full	N/A	–
Episode 9 (Monday, Oct. 20, 2025)	Niall	3	Aiden Ross	"What a Time"	Ava Nat	–	Team full	✔	✔
Episode 9 (Monday, Oct. 20, 2025)	Reba	4	Leyton Robinson	"Think I'm in Love with You"	Manny Costello	–	Team full	Team full	–
Episode 9 (Monday, Oct. 20, 2025)	Reba	5	Conrad Khalil	"It Takes Two"	Vinya Chhabra	–	Team full	Team full	–
Episode 9 (Monday, Oct. 20, 2025)	Snoop	6	Mindy Miller	"Angel from Montgomery"	Emmanuel Rey	–	Team full	Team full	N/A
Episode 9 (Monday, Oct. 20, 2025)	Niall	7	Kirbi	"You Say"	Carolina Rodriguez	–	Team full	Team full	✔
Episode 10 (Monday, Oct. 27, 2025)	Snoop	1	Ralph Edwards	"Lose Control"	Jerrell Melton	–	Team full	Team full	Team full
Episode 10 (Monday, Oct. 27, 2025)	Reba	2	Peyton Kyle	"Don't Dream It's Over"	Shan Scott	–	Team full	Team full	Team full
Episode 10 (Monday, Oct. 27, 2025)	Michael	3	Teo Ramdel	"Die with a Smile"	Elias Gomez	N/A	Team full	Team full	Team full
Episode 10 (Monday, Oct. 27, 2025)	Niall	4	DEK of Hearts	"I Will Wait"	Jack Austin	✔	Team full	Team full	Team full

== Knockouts ==
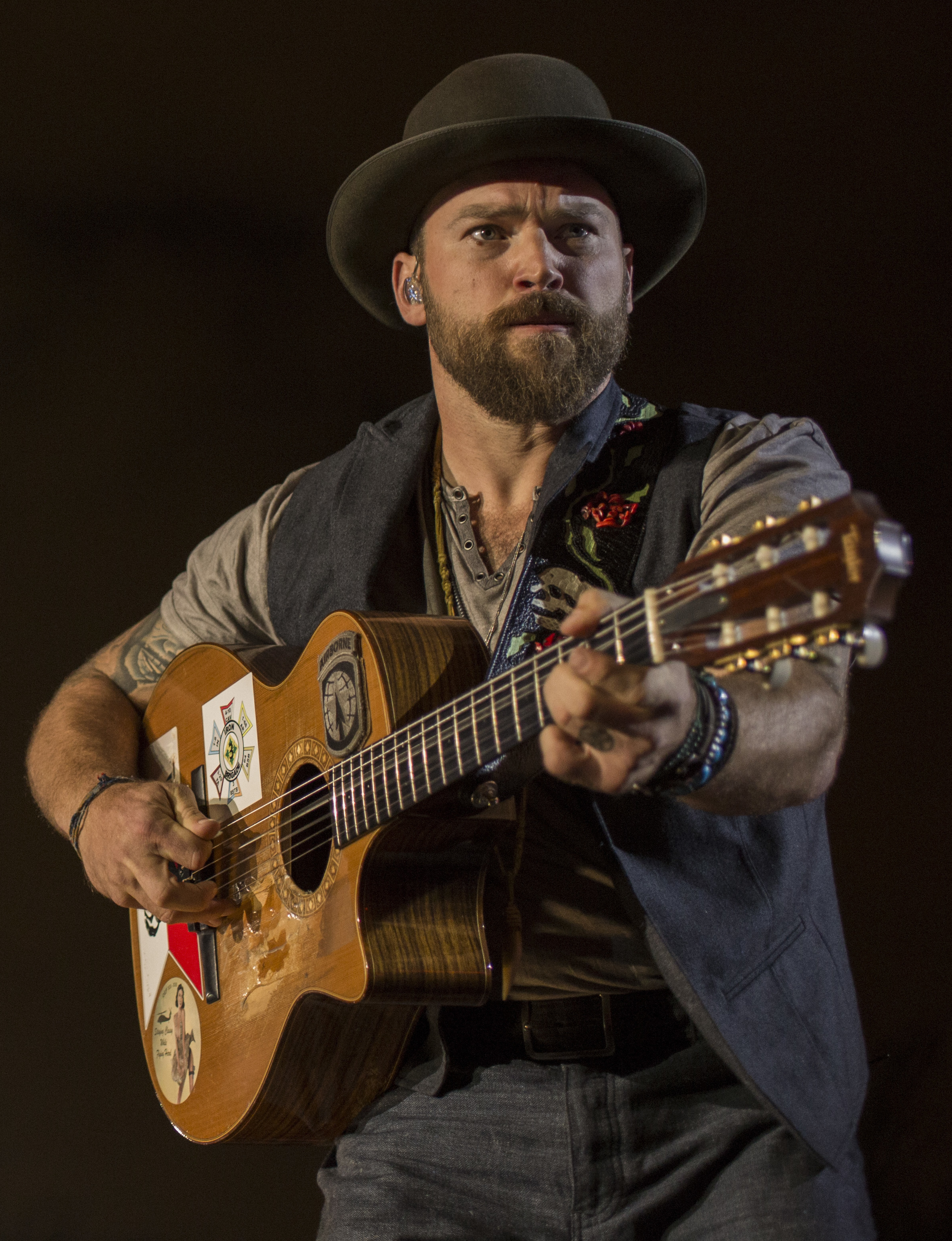
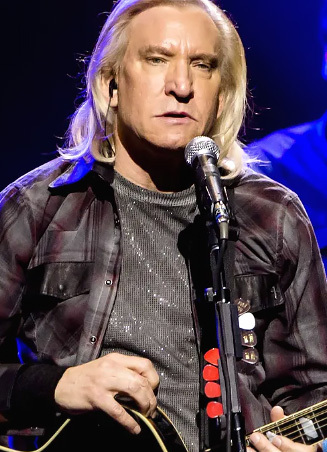
Zac Brown served as mega mentor for Teams Bublé and Snoop, and Joe Walsh served as mega mentor for Teams Niall and Reba.

The third stage of the show, the knockouts, aired from October 27, 2025, directly following the conclusion of the battles, to November 24, 2025, consisting of episodes 10 through 14. Zac Brown served as mega mentor for Teams Bublé and Snoop, while Joe Walsh served as mega mentor for Teams Niall and Reba. In the round, each coach groups two of their artists in a singing match. The artists themselves will select the song they will sing in the round, and then their coach selects one of them to advance to the playoffs. This season, there are no saves or steals, which marks the first time since the fourth season that no steals are in the Knockouts. Instead, this season introduces the "Mic Drop" button that each coach can use on one of their artists. The four recipients will be voted on by the public and the one with the most votes will perform at the Rose Parade on New Years Day 2026. Each coach will take four artists through at the end of the round, making a total of 16 artists advancing to the Playoffs.

Knockouts color key
Artist won the knockout and advanced to the playoffs
Artist won the knockout and their Coach used the "Mic Drop" button
Artist lost the knockout and was eliminated

Knockouts results
Episode	Coach	Order	Winner		Loser	
Episode	Coach	Order	Song	Artist	Artist	Song
Episode 10 (Monday, Oct. 27, 2025)	Reba	1	"I'm Gonna Love You Through It"	Aubrey Nicole	Leyton Robinson	"I Could Use a Love Song"
Episode 10 (Monday, Oct. 27, 2025)	Snoop	2	"Dive"	Ralph Edwards	Kenny Iko	"There Goes My Baby"
Episode 10 (Monday, Oct. 27, 2025)	Niall	3	"Hopelessly Devoted to You"	Ava Nat	Sadie Dahl	"Too Good at Goodbyes"
Episode 11 (Monday, Nov. 3, 2025)	Snoop	1	"Lady Marmalade"	Toni Lorene	Natalia Albertini	"I Wish"
Episode 11 (Monday, Nov. 3, 2025)	Niall	2	"When the Party's Over"	Aiden Ross	Liam von Elbe	"Over My Head (Cable Car)"
Episode 11 (Monday, Nov. 3, 2025)	Michael	3	"Don't You Worry 'bout a Thing"	Max Chambers	Max Cooper III	"End of Beginning"
Episode 12 (Monday, Nov. 10, 2025)	Reba	1	"Zombie"	Ryan Mitchell	Conrad Khalil	"Closer"
Episode 12 (Monday, Nov. 10, 2025)	Michael	2	"Wondering Why"	Rob Cole	Marty O'Reilly	"The Letter"
Episode 12 (Monday, Nov. 10, 2025)	Michael	3	"I'm Your Baby Tonight"	Trinity	Jack Austin	"Lego House"
Episode 12 (Monday, Nov. 10, 2025)	Niall	4	"What If I Never Get Over You"	DEK of Hearts	Kayleigh Clark	"Blue"
Episode 13 (Monday, Nov. 17, 2025)	Reba	1	"Hurricane"	Aaron Nichols	Cori Kennedy	"You and I"
Episode 13 (Monday, Nov. 17, 2025)	Snoop	2	"In Color"	Mindy Miller	Carolina Rodriguez	"Lovesong"
Episode 13 (Monday, Nov. 17, 2025)	Michael	3	"Cruisin'"	Jazz McKenzie	Teo Ramdel	"It's My Life"
Episode 14 (Monday, Nov. 24, 2025)	Reba	1	"I Don't Want to Be"	Peyton Kyle	Austin Gilbert	"Eight Second Ride"
Episode 14 (Monday, Nov. 24, 2025)	Niall	2	"Hard Fought Hallelujah"	Kirbi	Dustin Dale Gaspard	"She Talks to Angels"
Episode 14 (Monday, Nov. 24, 2025)	Snoop	3	"You're All I Need to Get By"	Yoshihanaa	Lauren Anderson	"Try"

=== Mic Drop ===
Following episode 14, voting opened to the public and the "Mic Drop" with the most votes will perform at the Rose Parade on New Years Day 2026. The results were revealed during the second week of the Playoffs on December 8, 2025.

Coach	Artist	Result
Michael Bublé	Max Chambers	Not Chosen
Niall Horan	DEK of Hearts	Chosen
Reba McEntire	Aaron Nichols	Not Chosen
Snoop Dogg	Yoshihanaa	Not Chosen

== Playoffs ==
The fourth stage of the show, the playoffs, aired from December 1 to December 8, consisting of episodes 15 through 16. The top 16 artists perform for the coaches with a song of their choosing. At the end of the round, each coach selects only one of their artists to advance, creating a total of 4 playoff artists directly advancing to the finale. However, this season, the public votes an additional artist from either of the two teams that performed in the episode to the finale. In total, 6 artists will advance to live finale.

Like seasons 6, 13, and 23–27, the playoffs were not contested live. They were prerecorded and taped at the same stage as the prior two rounds. Teams Bublé and Reba performed on the first episode, while Teams Niall and Snoop performed on the second episode.

Playoffs color key
Artist was saved by their coach
Artist was saved by public's vote
Artist was eliminated

Playoffs results
Episode	Coach	Order	Artist	Song	Result
Episode 15 (Monday, Dec. 1, 2025)	Reba McEntire	1	Aaron Nichols	"Beer Never Broke My Heart"	Eliminated
Episode 15 (Monday, Dec. 1, 2025)	Michael Bublé	2	Jazz McKenzie	"Don't Stop Believin'"	Michael's choice
Episode 15 (Monday, Dec. 1, 2025)	Reba McEntire	3	Ryan Mitchell	"Undressed"	Eliminated
Episode 15 (Monday, Dec. 1, 2025)	Michael Bublé	4	Trinity	"Barracuda"	Eliminated
Episode 15 (Monday, Dec. 1, 2025)	Reba McEntire	5	Aubrey Nicole	"Black Velvet"	Reba's choice
Episode 15 (Monday, Dec. 1, 2025)	Michael Bublé	6	Rob Cole	"I Hope You Dance"	Eliminated
Episode 15 (Monday, Dec. 1, 2025)	Reba McEntire	7	Peyton Kyle	"Hold Back the River"	Eliminated
Episode 15 (Monday, Dec. 1, 2025)	Michael Bublé	8	Max Chambers	"A Change Is Gonna Come"	Public's vote
Episode 16 (Monday, Dec. 8, 2025)	Snoop Dogg	1	Yoshihanaa	"And I Am Telling You I'm Not Going"	Eliminated
Episode 16 (Monday, Dec. 8, 2025)	Niall Horan	2	Kirbi	"Bruises"	Eliminated
Episode 16 (Monday, Dec. 8, 2025)	Snoop Dogg	3	Mindy Miller	"Not Ready to Make Nice"	Eliminated
Episode 16 (Monday, Dec. 8, 2025)	Niall Horan	4	Aiden Ross	"The Blower's Daughter"	Niall's choice
Episode 16 (Monday, Dec. 8, 2025)	Niall Horan	5	Ava Nat	"Ceilings"	Eliminated
Episode 16 (Monday, Dec. 8, 2025)	Snoop Dogg	6	Toni Lorene	"Bust Your Windows"	Eliminated
Episode 16 (Monday, Dec. 8, 2025)	Niall Horan	7	DEK of Hearts	"Helplessly Hoping"	Public's vote
Episode 16 (Monday, Dec. 8, 2025)	Snoop Dogg	8	Ralph Edwards	"A Song for You"	Snoop's choice

== Live finale ==
The season finale ran through two nights, Monday and Tuesday, December 15 through 16, 2025, comprising episodes 17 through 19. The Top 6 performed on Monday, with each artist performing a classic song and a contemporary song for the title of The Voice. At the episode's conclusion, the overnight voting for the season's winner began. The following night, on Tuesday, Ariana Madix and Dylan Efron hosted the finale preshow, recapping the previous night's performances and interviewing the six remaining finalists along with the night's guest performers. Immediately following, the finalists performed a holiday-themed duet with their respective coaches (due to Horan being on vocal rest, DEK of Hearts performed a duet with McEntire and Aiden Ross performed a duet with Gina Miles) before the results of the public vote were announced and the winner of the season was named.

Aiden Ross won the season, marking Niall Horan's third straight win as a coach. Horan became the second coach in the history of the show to win three consecutive seasons in the appearances on the show, following Blake Shelton's consecutive wins from seasons 2 to 4. However, Horan did not achieve this in consecutive numerical seasons as he took a three-season hiatus following season 24.

Finale results
Coach	Artist	Episode 17 (Monday, Dec. 15, 2025)				Episode 19 (Tuesday, Dec. 16, 2025)		Result
Coach	Artist	Order	Classic song	Order	Contemporary song	Order	Christmas Song Duet (with coach)	Result
Niall Horan	DEK of Hearts	1	"Fishin' in the Dark"	8	"Let It Go"	18	"Santa Claus Is Comin' to Town"	Third place
Michael Bublé	Max Chambers	10	"One Moment in Time"	2	"Your Way's Better"	17	"Blue Christmas"	Fifth place
Reba McEntire	Aubrey Nicole	7	"The Night the Lights Went Out in Georgia"	3	"'Til You Can't"	15	"Mary, Did You Know?"	Fourth place
Michael Bublé	Jazz McKenzie	4	"Against All Odds"	9	"Drivers License"	14	"Jingle Bell Rock"	Sixth place
Niall Horan	Aiden Ross	12	"The Winner Takes It All"	5	"Golden Hour"	13	"Last Christmas"	Winner
Snoop Dogg	Ralph Edwards	6	"I Want to Know What Love Is"	11	"Locked Out of Heaven"	16	"This Christmas"	Runner-up

Non-competition performances
Order	Performers	Song
19.1	Journey ft. Coaches (minus Horan) and non-finale playoff artists (minus Peyton Kyle)	"Lights" / "Lovin', Touchin', Squeezin'" / "Don't Stop Believin'"
19.2	Khalid	"Better"/ "Nah"
19.3	Sofronio Vasquez	"Superman"
19.4	Riley Green	"Jesus Saves"
19.5	XG	"Gala"
19.6	Zac Brown Band ft. Noah Cyrus	"Butterfly"

== Elimination chart ==
Results color key
Winner	Sixth place
Runner-up	Saved by the public
Third place	Saved by their coach
Fourth place	Eliminated
Fifth place

Coaches color key
Team Bublé
Team Reba
Team Niall
Team Snoop

=== Overall ===
Elimination chart for The Voice season 28
Artists	Playoffs	Finale
Aiden Ross	Safe	Winner
Ralph Edwards	Safe	Runner-up
DEK of Hearts	Safe	Third place
Aubrey Nicole	Safe	Fourth place
Max Chambers	Safe	Fifth place
Jazz McKenzie	Safe	Sixth place
Rob Cole	Eliminated	Eliminated (Playoffs)
Kirbi	Eliminated	Eliminated (Playoffs)
Peyton Kyle	Eliminated	Eliminated (Playoffs)
Toni Lorene	Eliminated	Eliminated (Playoffs)
Mindy Miller	Eliminated	Eliminated (Playoffs)
Ryan Mitchell	Eliminated	Eliminated (Playoffs)
Ava Nat	Eliminated	Eliminated (Playoffs)
Aaron Nichols	Eliminated	Eliminated (Playoffs)
Trinity	Eliminated	Eliminated (Playoffs)
Yoshihanaa	Eliminated	Eliminated (Playoffs)

=== Per team ===
Elimination chart for The Voice season 28 per team
Artists	Playoffs	Finale
Max Chambers	Advanced	Fifth place
Jazz McKenzie	Advanced	Sixth place
Rob Cole	Eliminated	
Trinity	Eliminated	
Aubrey Nicole	Advanced	Fourth place
Peyton Kyle	Eliminated	
Ryan Mitchell	Eliminated	
Aaron Nichols	Eliminated	
Aiden Ross	Advanced	Winner
DEK of Hearts	Advanced	Third place
Kirbi	Eliminated	
Ava Nat	Eliminated	
Ralph Edwards	Advanced	Runner-up
Toni Lorene	Eliminated	
Mindy Miller	Eliminated	
Yoshihanaa	Eliminated	

== Ratings ==
Viewership and ratings per episode of The Voice season 28
No.	Title	Air date	Timeslot (ET)	Rating (18–49)	Viewers (millions)	DVR (18–49)	DVR viewers (millions)	Total (18–49)	Total viewers (millions)	Ref.
1	"The Blind Auditions, Season Premiere"	September 22, 2025	Monday 8:00 p.m.	0.4	5.21	0.1	1.25	0.5	6.46	
2	"The Blind Auditions, Part 2"	September 23, 2025	Tuesday 8:00 p.m.	0.4	5.43	0.1	1.07	0.5	6.48	
3	"The Blind Auditions, Part 3"	September 29, 2025	Monday 8:00 p.m.	0.3	5.12	TBD	TBD	TBD	TBD	
4	"The Blind Auditions, Part 4"	September 30, 2025	Tuesday 9:00 p.m.	0.4	4.50	TBD	TBD	TBD	TBD	
5	"The Blind Auditions, Part 5"	October 6, 2025	Monday 8:00 p.m.	0.3	4.74	TBD	TBD	TBD	TBD	
6	"The Blind Auditions, Part 6"	October 7, 2025	Tuesday 8:00 p.m.	0.4	4.81	TBD	TBD	TBD	TBD	
7	"The Battles Premiere"	October 13, 2025	Monday 8:00 p.m.	0.3	4.83	TBD	TBD	TBD	TBD	
8	"The Battles Part 2"	October 14, 2025	Tuesday 8:00 p.m.	0.4	4.77	TBD	TBD	TBD	TBD	
9	"The Battles Part 3"	October 20, 2025	Monday 8:00 p.m.	0.3	4.62	TBD	TBD	TBD	TBD	
10	"The Battles, Part 4/The Knockouts Premiere"	October 27, 2025	Monday 8:00 p.m.	0.3	4.47	TBD	TBD	TBD	TBD	
11	"The Knockouts Part 2"	November 3, 2025	Monday 9:00 p.m.	0.2	3.66	TBD	TBD	TBD	TBD	
12	"The Knockouts Part 3"	November 10, 2025	Monday 9:00 p.m.	0.2	3.49	TBD	TBD	TBD	TBD	
13	"The Knockouts Part 4"	November 17, 2025	Monday 9:00 p.m.	0.2	3.53	TBD	TBD	TBD	TBD	
14	"The Knockouts Part 5"	November 24, 2025	Monday 9:00 p.m.	0.3	3.62	TBD	TBD	TBD	TBD	
15	"The Playoffs Premiere"	December 1, 2025	Monday 9:00 p.m.	0.3	3.49	TBD	TBD	TBD	TBD	
16	"The Playoffs Part 2"	December 8, 2025	Monday 9:00 p.m.	TBD	TBD	TBD	TBD	TBD	TBD	
17	"Live Finale Top 6 Performances"	December 15, 2025	Monday 9:00 p.m.	TBD	TBD	TBD	TBD	TBD	TBD	
18	"Live Finale Preshow"	December 16, 2025	Tuesday 8:00 p.m.	TBD	TBD	TBD	TBD	TBD	TBD	
19	"Live Finale Results"	December 16, 2025	Tuesday 9:00 p.m.	TBD	TBD	TBD	TBD	TBD	TBD	
