= I Sit in Parks =

2025 single by Kelsea Ballerini

Single by Kelsea Ballerini

from the EP Mount Pleasant
- Released: November 7, 2025
- Genre: Country
- Length: 2:10
- Label: Black River
- Songwriter: Kelsea Ballerini
- Producer: Ballerini

Kelsea Ballerini singles chronology
"Baggage" (2025)	"I Sit in Parks" (2025)	"Another Drink" (2026)

Music video
- "I Sit in Parks" on YouTube

"I Sit in Parks" is a song by American country music singer Kelsea Ballerini, released on November 7, 2025, as the lead single from her third EP, Mount Pleasant (2025).

== Background ==
Earlier in the week of the song's release, Ballerini teased the song on social media with a video of herself swinging on a swingset in a park, alongside a message hinting at the context: "welcome to the park, where daydreaming and crash outs, 'what a life' and 'what now?', wandering and wondering...are all at play".

== Composition ==
The song is driven by acoustic guitar. Kelsea Ballerini reflects on what her life might have been like if she had married and had children, rather than prioritizing her music career, and whether she made the right choice. She first describes sitting in a park and forlornly watching a woman of her age having a picnic with her husband and kids. In the chorus, Ballerini questions if it is too late for her to have children, believing that such goals do not necessarily align with her body clock and expressing that she may never have the life she wanted. However, she also has mixed feelings about the path she chose when considering her achievements as a musician, which is further reinforced in the second verse when she mentions the praise she has received from Rolling Stone. Ballerini also wonders if the mother she is observing would want her freedom, and mentions that she is taking Lexapro. She concludes the song referencing that her friend, makeup and hair artist Tarryn Feldman, had a baby due in June 2025, contrasting this with how her album Patterns was due in March.

== Critical reception ==
Maxim Mower of Holler described Kelsea Ballerini's vocals as "sleek, enchanting" and "drifting dreamily" and remarked that "The hook is subtly infectious, with Ballerini once again showcasing her ear for a killer chorus on this track." Jessica Nicholson of Billboard wrote of the song, "This is Ballerini doing what she does best—crafting vulnerable, self-aware songs that explore her hopes, dreams, doubts and insecurities in real time, while mirroring the experiences of those who share similar longings."

== Music video ==
The music video was released alongside the single. It sees Kelsea Ballerini seemingly spending time at the park on a swing, as visuals of kids surface in her thoughts, but at the end of the clip the camera pans out to reveal that she has been swinging against a backdrop on a video set all along.

== Political reaction ==
Conservative commentators have perceived the song as highlighting the supposed disadvantages of feminism. YouTuber Isabel Brown called it "the most hauntingly tragic song about feeling like you missed the mark on wanting to have children because you were listening to the most horrifying feminist voices" and said that the lyrics signal the results of "listening to all of the feminist voices in society say, 'You're on the right road. Keep taking your depression meds because that's the only thing that's gonna keep you going.'" In an op-ed for Fox News, Bethany Mandel called the song "heartbreaking" because of its honesty, stating "She's saying out loud what millions of women feel but are too afraid to admit: that the promises of feminism —the ones that said motherhood would chain them, that domesticity was a trap, that real meaning lay in career success and unencumbered independence — left them emptier than before." Mandel believed the lyrics "They lay on a blanket / And God damn it, he loves her / I wonder if she wants my freedom / like I want to be a mother" expose "the performative feminism of our time", adding that "We were sold a freedom that was supposed to make us happy. Instead, it's made us lonely. We traded roots for wings, but no one told us how to land."

== Charts ==
Chart performance for "I Sit in Parks"
Chart (2025)	Peak position
New Zealand Hot Singles (RMNZ)	20
US Bubbling Under Hot 100 (Billboard)	18
US Hot Country Songs (Billboard)	32
