= Gina Miles (singer) =

American pop singer

- Born: November 6, 2003 (age 22); Paxton, Illinois, U.S.
- Genre: Pop
- Occupation: Singer
- Instrument: Vocals
- Years active: 2022–present
- Label: Republic
- Website: ginamilesmusic.com

Gina Miles (born November 6, 2003) is an American pop singer-songwriter. She is the winner of season 23 of the American talent competition The Voice with the closest margin to-date, She competed on the team coached by Niall Horan, giving Horan his first win as a coach on the show.

== Life and career ==
Miles was born on November 6, 2003, in Paxton, Illinois. She was raised by a single-father who worked as a disc jockey. At fourteen, she helped her father prepare his equipment for his gigs, bolstering her interest in pursuing a career in music, which led her to performing music gigs. She attended Gibson City-Melvin-Sibley High School, where she joined show choir and band. When she turned 18, she decided to move to Sacramento, California with her aunt to pursue a career in the music industry.

=== 2022: Who Are You ===
In 2022, Miles released her debut EP, Who Are You, containing six tracks.

2023-2024: The Voice, Wicked Game

Performances on The Voice season 23
Round	Theme	Song	Original artist	Order	Original air date	Result
Blind Auditions	—N/a	"The One That Got Away"	Katy Perry	5.4	March 20, 2023	Kelly Clarkson and Niall Horan turned; joined Team Niall.
Battles (Top 40)	—N/a	"Skinny Love" (vs. Kala Banham)	Bon Iver	7.3	March 27, 2023	Saved by Niall
Knockouts (Top 28)	—N/a	"Somebody That I Used to Know" (vs. Kate Cosentino)	Gotye feat. Kimbra	12.3	April 17, 2023	Saved by Niall
Playoffs (Top 20)	—N/a	"Wicked Game"	Chris Isaak	15.4	May 8, 2023	Saved by Niall
Live Semi-finals (Top 8)	—N/a	"All I Want"	Kodaline	16.5	May 15, 2023	Saved by Public
Live Finale (Final 5)	"Uptempo song"	"Style"	Taylor Swift	17.5	May 22, 2023	Winner
Live Finale (Final 5)	"Ballad"	"Nothing Compares 2 U"	Sinéad O'Connor	17.10	May 22, 2023	Winner
Live Finale (Final 5)	"Duet with coach"	"New York State of Mind" (Duet with Niall Horan)	Billy Joel	19.11	May 23, 2023	Winner

In 2023, Miles competed in the 23rd season of The Voice. In the blind auditions, she sang "The One That Got Away" by Katy Perry. Two of the four coaches, Kelly Clarkson and Niall Horan, turned their chairs for her, while Chance the Rapper and Blake Shelton refrained. She chose to join Team Niall. While competing, Miles shared in an interview with People that her experience on the show was "emotionally draining and scary", while it was "the best experience of her life". Her finale performance of "Nothing Compares 2 U" by Sinéad O'Connor received a positive reception online.

Miles went on to win the season on May 23, 2023. Before Miles was announced as winner of the season, host Carson Daly remarked that the winner of the season, which was revealed to be Miles soon after, had the slimmest margin of victory in all twenty-three seasons of the show. Her win was seen by some outlets as "unexpected" (with even Miles herself expressing shock at her win), as it was widely expected that her closest competitor, runner-up Grace West, from Blake Shelton's team, would win as Shelton's tenth and final victory. Ultimately, Miles won US$100,000 (equivalent to $105,668 in 2025) and a record deal with Republic Records, a label owned by Universal Music Group.

On June 30, 2023, Miles performed the national anthem at the special graduation ceremony of Sacramento-based firefighters. Miles served as an opening act to Jewel's concert at The Venue at Thunder Valley, on September 16, 2023. On July 6, 2023, Miles teased her upcoming song, "Someone New", via Instagram. On October 8, 2023, Miles performed the National Anthem at the Dallas Cowboys vs. San Francisco 49ers football game.

On May 17, 2024 Miles released her cover of Wicked Game via Republic Records accompanied a performance video by 1824 productions. On May 21, 2024, Miles performed "Wicked Game" at the season 25 finale of The Voice.

On June 10, 2024, Miles performed the American national anthem during game 2 of the 2024 Stanley Cup Final. Miles opened for her coach Niall Horan for two of his The Show: Live on Tour dates: July 9 and 26, 2024. Miles opened for Jonah Marais on September 26, 2024. From November 16 to 22 2024, Miles was the opener for Marais’s second half of his Young & Optimistic Tour on all four dates. Miles performed the national anthem for Kansas City Chiefs vs. San Francisco 49ers football game on October 21, 2024. She also performed the national anthem for LA Galaxy on November 22, 2024. Miles performed daily at NAMM Convention during the show from 12:30PM – 1:00PM PT, Thursday through Saturday, January 23–25. On December 16, 2025, Miles returned to the season 28 finale of The Voice to perform a holiday duet with contestant Aiden Ross, who shortly after won the season.

== Artistry ==
Miles has stated that while she has been exposed to various genres in her upbringing, including Country and R&B, her favorite genre to sing is Pop. In an interview with Parade, Miles expressed that she intends to produce music that "feels authentic and real" to her.

Her debut EP, Who Are You, has been described as "very experimental".

== Discography ==
=== Extended plays ===
List of extended plays, showing selected details, selected chart positions, and sales figures
Title	Details	Peak chart positions	Sales
Title	Details	iTunes	Sales
Who Are You	Released: January 28, 2022; Label: Farm To Label Records	74	
"—" denotes a recording that did not chart or was not released in that territory

=== Singles ===
List of singles, showing year released, selected chart positions, and the name of the album
Title	Year	Peak chart positions	Album
Title	Year	iTunes	Album
"I Can Feel It"	2022	—	Who Are You
"Fever"	2022	—	Who Are You
"Incredibly Impatient”	2022	—	Who Are You
"Cherry Pie"	2022	—	Who Are You
"End With You"	2022	—	Who Are You
"End With You Extended Version”	2022	—	Who Are You
"Wicked Game"	2024	28	TBA
"Hypnotized"	2025	—	TBA

Awards and achievements
Preceded by Bryce Leatherwood	The Voice (American); Winner; 2023 (Spring)	Succeeded by Huntley
Preceded by "T-R-O-U-B-L-E"	The Voice (American); Winner's song "Style"; 2023 (Spring)	Succeeded by "Higher"
