= Aiden Ross (singer) =

American singer-songwriter

- Born: 2005 (age 20–21)
- Origin: College Station, Texas, U.S.
- Genres: Pop; soul
- Occupation: Singer
- Instruments: Vocals; guitar
- Years active: 2025–present
- Label: Republic
- Website: aidenrossmusic.com

Aiden Ross (born 2005) is an American pop singer-songwriter. He is the winner of season 28 of the American talent competition The Voice. He competed on the team coached by Niall Horan, giving Horan his third consecutive win as a coach on the show.

In September 2025, shortly prior to his The Voice audition being aired, Ross released his debut single, "Everything and More". Ross' music primarily incorporates pop and soul elements.

== Early and personal life ==
Ross began singing as a child on his family's farm, learning to play the guitar and harmonize with his sister. In high school, he joined A-Side, an a cappella group on campus. In 2022, the group placed third in a local a cappella competition, competing against thirteen other groups from a high school and college level. In the same competition, Ross performed "Everything I Did to Get to You" and won the award for best soloist. In his senior year of high school, Ross first applied to audition for The Voice but decided to drop out before to attend engineering school.Ross is currently studying engineering at Texas A&M University.

== Career ==
=== 2025–present: "Everything and More" and The Voice ===
Ross released his debut single, "Everything and More", in September 2025.

Performances on The Voice season 28
| Round | Theme | Song | Original artist | Order | Original air date | Result |
|---|---|---|---|---|---|---|
| Blind Auditions | —N/a | "Love in the Dark" | Adele | 1.1 | Sept. 22, 2025 | Michael Bublé, Reba McEntire, Niall Horan, and Snoop Dogg turned; elected to join Team Niall. |
| Battles (Top 48) | —N/a | "What a Time" (vs. Ava Nat) | Julia Michaels ft. Niall Horan | 9.3 | Oct. 20, 2025 | Saved by Niall |
| Knockouts (Top 32) | —N/a | "When the Party's Over" (vs. Liam von Elbe) | Billie Eilish | 11.2 | Nov. 3, 2025 | Saved by Niall |
| Playoffs (Top 20) | —N/a | "The Blower's Daughter" | Damien Rice | 16.4 | Dec. 8, 2025 | Saved by Niall |
| Live Finale (Final 6) | "Contemporary song" | "Golden Hour" | JVKE | 17.5 | Dec. 15, 2025 | Winner |
| Live Finale (Final 6) | "Classic Song" | "The Winner Takes It All" | ABBA | 17.12 | Dec. 15, 2025 | Winner |
| Live Finale (Final 6) | "Holiday Duet" | "Last Christmas" (Duet with Gina Miles) | Wham! | 19.1 | Dec. 16, 2025 | Winner |

In 2025, Ross competed in the 28th season of The Voice. In the blind auditions, he sang "Love in the Dark" by Adele. All of the season's four coaches (Michael Bublé, Reba McEntire, Niall Horan, and Snoop Dogg) turned their chairs for Ross. He chose Team Niall, where Horan selected Ross to advance through the battle, knockout, and playoff rounds of the show. Ross was named the winner of the season on December 16, 2025, meaning Horan had his third consecutive win as a coach, after his contestants in season 23, Gina Miles, and season 24, Huntley, won their seasons in May and December 2023, respectively. Ross won $100,000 and a record deal with Republic Records, a label owned by Universal Music Group.

Ross released his second single, "Love Her Anyway", on January 1, 2026. Ahead of its release, Ross described the single as being about "…loving someone deeply while being scared of the uncertainty that comes with it."

== Artistry ==
In an interview, Ross claims "people don't care what you're doing if they don't feel" and states that "balancing those two aspects has been important to [him]." His genre has been described as mix of both pop and soul.

== Discography ==
=== Singles ===
List of singles, showing year released, and the name of the album
| Title | Year | EP |
|---|---|---|
| "Everything and More" | 2025 | TBA |
| "Love Her Anyway" | 2026 | TBA |

Awards and achievements
| Preceded by Adam David | The Voice (American); Winner; 2025 (Fall) | Succeeded by Alexia Jayy |
| Preceded by "Hard Fought Hallelujah" | The Voice (American); Winner's song "The Winner Takes It All"; 2025 (Fall) | Succeeded by "Lady Marmalade" |
