= Baggage (song) =

Single by Kelsea Ballerini

from the album Patterns
- Released: May 5, 2025
- Genre: Country
- Length: 2:32
- Label: Black River
- Songwriters: Kelsea Ballerini; Jessie Jo Dillon; Karen Fairchild; Hillary Lindsey; Alysa Vanderheym
- Producers: Kelsea Ballerini; Alysa Vanderheym

Kelsea Ballerini singles chronology
"Cowboys Cry Too" (2024)	"Baggage" (2025)	"I Sit in Parks" (2025)

"Baggage" is a song recorded by American country music artist Kelsea Ballerini. It was released to country music radio on May 5, 2025, as the second single from Ballerini's fifth studio album, Patterns.

== Content ==
Ballerini co-wrote the song with Jessie Jo Dillon, Karen Fairchild, Hillary Lindsey, and Alysa Vanderheym, and co-produced the track with Vanderherym. Lyrically, the song finds the narrator warning a new love interest that she comes with "baggage", though expressing an eagerness to leave the past behind and start anew.

== Live performances ==
Ballerini performed "Baggage" live on the 60th Academy of Country Music Awards on May 8, 2025. She performed the song again on The Voice on May 13, 2025, delivering a stripped-down acoustic performance and sharing the stage with the song's four female co-writers for the first time.

== Commercial performance ==
"Baggage" debuted at number 60 on the Billboard Country Airplay dated for June 7, 2025.

== Charts ==
Weekly chart performance for "Baggage"
Chart (2025–2026)	Peak position
Canada Country (Billboard)	52
US Country Airplay (Billboard)	26
US Hot Country Songs (Billboard)	42
