= Mount Pleasant (EP) =

EP by Kelsea Ballerini
- Released: November 14, 2025
- Length: 15:26
- Label: Black River
- Producer: Kelsea Ballerini; Alysa Vanderheym

Kelsea Ballerini chronology
Patterns (2024)	Mount Pleasant (2025)

Singles from Mount Pleasant
- 1. "I Sit in Parks" Released: November 7, 2025

Mount Pleasant is the third extended play (EP) by American singer Kelsea Ballerini. The EP was released on November 14, 2025, through Black River Entertainment. The lead single, "I Sit in Parks", was released on November 7, 2025.

== Background ==
In November 2025, Ballerini began teasing new music through a short video posted on her social media accounts. The clip featured her sitting on a swingset in a park, accompanied by the caption "I Sit In Parks" which led fans to speculate about an upcoming release, titled Mount Pleasant. Discussing the project, Ballerini stated, "I have always made records – whether songs, EPs or albums – to capture a moment in time. Mount Pleasant is a collection of six songs I've written throughout the summer, marking a chapter of heavy self-examination, longing and stepping further into who I am as a 32-year-old woman."

The project follows her 2024 album Patterns, which became her first to debut at number one on Billboard's Top Country Albums chart.

== Promotion ==
Ballerini teased Mount Pleasant on November 6, 2025, via her social media with a track list consisting of six songs.

=== Singles ===
The lead single, "I Sit in Parks", was released on November 7, 2025.

== Track listing ==
Mount Pleasant track listing
No.	Title	Writer(s)	Length
1.	"I Sit in Parks"	Kelsea Ballerini	2:10
2.	"People Pleaser"	Ballerini; Jessie Jo Dillon; Alysa Vanderheym	2:12
3.	"Emerald City"	Ballerini; Vanderheym; Nicolle Galyon; Jordan Reynolds	2:16
4.	"587"	Ballerini; Vanderheym; Mikky Ekko	2:49
5.	"The Revisionist"	Ballerini; Galyon; Reynolds; Vanderheym	2:52
6.	"Check on Your Friends"	Ballerini; Vanderheym	3:07
Total length:			15:26

== Personnel ==
Credits were adapted from Tidal.

- Kelsea Ballerini – lead vocals, production (all tracks), background vocals (tracks 2–4, 6)
- Alysa Vanderheym – production (all tracks), programming (1, 2, 6), bass guitar (1), acoustic guitar (2, 3, 6), background vocals (2), electric guitar (4), synthesizer (5)
- Will Kienzie – surround mixing
- Ilya Toshinskiy – acoustic guitar
- Tony Lucido – bass guitar
- Nir Z – drums
- Derek Wells – electric guitar
- Alex Wright – keyboards (1, 2), organ (3), synthesizer (4, 6)
- Jordan Reynolds – background vocals (1, 3, 5); production, acoustic guitar (3); piano (5)
- Jeff Braun – programming (1, 3, 6)
- Lenny Pey – acoustic guitar (1), electric guitar (4)
- Justin Schipper – guitar (2, 3, 6)
- Mikky Ekko – background vocals (4)

== Charts ==
Chart performance for Mount Pleasant
Chart (2025)	Peak position
Australian Albums (ARIA)	66
Australian Country Albums (ARIA)	7
UK Album Downloads (OCC)	19
US Billboard 200	68
US Independent Albums (Billboard)	11
US Top Country Albums (Billboard)	9
