= Patterns (Kelsea Ballerini album) =

- Standard cover

Studio album by Kelsea Ballerini
- Released: October 25, 2024
- Studio: Sound Stage (Nashville); Vanderhaus (Nashville); Abide by the Vibe (Nashville)
- Genre: Country pop
- Length: 46:00
- Label: Black River
- Producer: Kelsea Ballerini; Alysa Vanderheym

Kelsea Ballerini chronology
Rolling Up the Welcome Mat (2023)	Patterns (2024)	Mount Pleasant (2025)

Singles from Patterns
- 1. "Cowboys Cry Too" Released: June 28, 2024; 2. "Baggage" Released: May 5, 2025

Patterns is the fifth studio album by American singer Kelsea Ballerini. The album was released on October 25, 2024, through Black River Entertainment. Ballerini co-produced the album along with Alysa Vanderheym. "Cowboys Cry Too" was released as its first single on June 28, 2024. Three other songs were put out as promotional singles: "Sorry Mom", "Two Things", and "First Rodeo". The deluxe edition of Patterns was released on March 7, 2025.

== Content ==
Ballerini opted for an all-women approach to Patterns, as she co-wrote and co-produced all 15 tracks on the album with Alysa Vanderheym, with additional writing on several songs from Jessie Jo Dillon, Karen Fairchild of Little Big Town, and Hillary Lindsey. She said the process happened "organically" following a songwriting retreat with her female collaborators, birthing an album "made from womanhood and sisterhood". The follow-up to the Rolling Up the Welcome Mat EP (2023) that documented the end of her marriage, Ballerini described Patterns as a "super autobiographical" album, taking the listener on a journey when listened from top-to-bottom. She highlighted that the album is "not a love record", saying: "I think the whole record takes you through a very real journey of people that come together that have relational history and public relational history and different upbringings and different family dynamics and all these things, and you come together as adults and you have lives to sort through to be able to build one together. And to me, that is the most appealing part of love, sorting through all that and finding those dynamics that you're able to undo those patterns together. And I think it's a love record. It's just probably not what people are expecting".

Ballerini credited boyfriend Chase Stokes as being present during the entire creation process for Patterns, and the inspiration for the song "How Much Do You Love Me?" which she declared the "softest song" on the record. She referred to "Beg for Your Love" as the record's most vulnerable moment and the next step following "Leave Me Again", the closing track on Rolling Up the Welcome Mat. A deluxe re-issue of the album was released on March 7, 2025, which includes "To the Men That Love Women After Heartbreak" and four new bonus tracks.

== Critical reception ==
Professional ratings
Review scores
Source	Rating
AllMusic	3.5/5 stars
Atwood Magazine	7.1/10
Entertainment Focus	4/5 stars
Euphoria Magazine	3.5/5 stars
Rolling Stone	3.5/5 stars
Stereoboard	3/5 stars

James Christopher Monger of AllMusic praised Patterns as a vulnerable and reflective album, highlighting Ballerini's exploration of both past heartbreak and newfound joy. He described the songs as "simultaneously wistful and upbeat," singling out tracks like "Sorry Mom" and the Noah Kahan duet "Cowboys Cry Too" for their emotional depth. Monger noted that the album feels "assured, lived-in, and loved," with Ballerini's vocals conveying a sense of hard-earned confidence. Rolling Stone writer Jon Dolan gave the album three-and-a-half stars out of five, speaking favorably of the album's "characteristically varied collection that finds her looking inward with honesty and resolve, staying strong without sounding too heavy about it". Jof Owen with Holler rated the album a nine out of 10, declaring it a "country pop grand slam" and favorably comparing it to Taylor Swift's The Tortured Poets Department and Kacey Musgraves' Star-Crossed, while stating that Ballerini's "recovery technique feels more straightforwardly out-with-the-old-and-in-with-the-new. There's a new bed for her boots to go under, and she doesn't spend a lot of time reminiscing over what went on between the sheets of the old one she used to sleep in".

== Chart performance ==
Patterns debuted at number 4 on the Billboard 200, marking her highest-charting album to date, and second top 10 entry following Unapologetically (2017). It also debuted atop the Billboard Top Country Albums chart, Ballerini's first album to reach number one on the chart. It arrived with 54,000 equivalent album units earned — her best week by units.

== Promotion ==
Ballerini celebrated the album release with a headlining show at Madison Square Garden on October 29, 2024, and embarked on her first headlining arena tour in January 2025.

=== Singles ===
The album includes a collaboration with Noah Kahan on "Cowboys Cry Too", which was released as the lead single on June 28, 2024. "Baggage" was released as the album's second single on May 5, 2025.

=== Promotional singles ===
"Sorry Mom", "Two Things", and "First Rodeo" were all issued as promotional singles ahead of the album release, and all were accompanied by the release of music videos.

== Track listing ==
Patterns track listing
No.	Title	Writer(s)	Length
1.	"Patterns"	Kelsea Ballerini; Jessie Jo Dillon; Karen Fairchild; Hillary Lindsey; Alysa Vanderheym	3:40
2.	"Sorry Mom"	Ballerini; Dillon; Fairchild; Lindsey; Vanderheym	3:35
3.	"Baggage"	Ballerini; Dillon; Fairchild; Lindsey; Vanderheym	2:32
4.	"First Rodeo"	Ballerini; Dillon; Fairchild; Lindsey; Vanderheym	3:43
5.	"Nothing Really Matters"	Ballerini; Dillon; Vanderheym	2:37
6.	"How Much Do You Love Me"	Ballerini; Dillon; Vanderheym	3:33
7.	"Two Things"	Ballerini; Dillon; Fairchild; Lindsey; Vanderheym	3:35
8.	"We Broke Up"	Ballerini; Dillon; Fairchild; Lindsey; Vanderheym	2:45
9.	"Wait!"	Ballerini; Vanderheym	3:02
10.	"Beg for Your Love"	Ballerini; Dillon; Fairchild; Lindsey; Vanderheym	3:06
11.	"Deep"	Ballerini; Dillon; Vanderheym	2:22
12.	"Cowboys Cry Too" (with Noah Kahan)	Ballerini; Noah Kahan; Vanderheym	3:51
13.	"I Would, Would You"	Ballerini; Dillon; Vanderheym	2:52
14.	"This Time Last Year"	Ballerini; Vanderheym	3:41
15.	"Did You Make It Home?" (outro)	Ballerini; Vanderheym	0:59
Total length:			46:00

Patterns digital download bonus tracks
No.	Title	Writer(s)	Length
16.	"Two Things" (stripped)	Ballerini; Dillon; Fairchild; Lindsey; Vanderheym	3:42
17.	"To the Men That Love Women After Heartbreak"	Ballerini; Dillon; Fairchild; Lindsey	2:33
Total length:			52:00

Patterns deluxe edition
No.	Title	Writer(s)	Length
16.	"To the Men That Love Women After Heartbreak"	Ballerini; Dillon; Fairchild; Lindsey	2:52
17.	"Future Tripping"	Ballerini; Vanderheym	2:28
18.	"Put It to Bed"	Ballerini; Vanderheym	2:47
19.	"Cut Me Up"	Ballerini; Dillon; Vanderheym	2:35
20.	"Hindsight Is Happiness"	Ballerini; Vanderheym	3:12
Total length:			59:54

== Personnel ==
=== Musicians ===
- Kelsea Ballerini – vocals (all tracks), background vocals (tracks 1–14), acoustic guitar (10)
- Alysa Vanderheym – programming (tracks 1–4, 7–9, 11–14), electric guitar (1–3, 5, 7, 9, 12–14), synthesizer (1, 2, 4–9, 11, 12, 14), acoustic guitar (1, 2, 5–7, 9, 10, 12–15), background vocals (4, 8, 14), mandolin (13)
- Derek Wells – electric guitar (tracks 1–11, 13–15)
- Craig Young – bass (tracks 1–7, 9, 12–14)
- Todd Lombardo – acoustic guitar (tracks 1–4, 6, 7, 12, 14, 15), mandolin (4, 14), banjo (12)
- Aaron Sterling – drums (tracks 1, 2, 5, 8)
- Alex Wright – synthesizer (tracks 1, 3, 4, 6, 10, 11, 13), Hammond B3 (1, 12, 14), piano (11)
- Ilya Toshinskiy – acoustic guitar (tracks 1, 3, 5, 8, 13), mandolin (1, 3, 5, 8), Dobro (1, 11)
- Hillary Lindsey – background vocals (tracks 1, 4, 8)
- Dan Grech-Marguerat – programming (tracks 2, 4, 5, 12, 14)
- Justin Schipper – steel guitar (tracks 3, 4, 7, 12, 14), Dobro (12)
- Nir Z – drums (tracks 3, 4, 7, 9, 12, 14)
- Kris Donegan – electric guitar (tracks 3, 4, 7, 12, 14)
- Jeff Braun – programming (tracks 3, 13)
- Tyler Tomlinson – acoustic guitar, Dobro, electric guitar (tracks 4, 11)
- Devin Dawson – acoustic guitar (tracks 4, 13), bass (8, 11)
- Caitlin Evanson – fiddle (tracks 4, 13)
- Aspene Taylor – piano (track 7), Hammond B3 (11), synthesizer (14)
- Marcus Wiles – piano, synthesizer (tracks 11, 13); Fender Rhodes (15)
- Noah Kahan – vocals, background vocals (track 12)
- John Osborne – electric guitar (track 12)
- Kelly Bolton – background vocals (track 13)

=== Technical ===
- Alysa Vanderheym – production (all tracks), mixing (tracks 1, 6, 10, 15), recording (10, 15), additional recording (1–9, 11–14), editing (15)
- Kelsea Ballerini – production
- Andrew Mendelson – mastering
- Dan Grech-Marguerat – mixing (tracks 2, 4, 5, 12, 14)
- Jeff Braun – mixing (tracks 3, 13)
- Serban Ghenea – mixing (tracks 7, 9, 11)
- Alex Ghenea – mixing (track 8)
- Mike Stankiewicz – recording (tracks 1, 2, 5, 6, 8, 9, 11, 13)
- Drew Bollman – recording (tracks 3, 4, 7, 12, 14)
- Gabe Simon – Noah Kahan vocal recording and production (track 12)
- Louis Remenapp – editing (tracks 1, 2, 4–7, 12, 14), recording assistance (tracks 1, 2, 5, 6, 8, 11, 13)
- Chris Small – editing (tracks 1–3, 5, 6, 8, 9, 11, 13, 14)
- Luke Armentrout – mastering assistance
- Adam Battershell – mastering assistance
- Joey Salit – mastering assistance
- Andrew Darby – mastering assistance
- Taylor Chadwick – mastering assistance
- Luke Burgoyne – mixing assistance (tracks 2, 4, 5, 12, 14)
- Seb Maletka-Calata – mixing assistance (tracks 2, 4, 5, 12, 14)
- Zach Kuhlmann – recording assistance (tracks 3, 4, 7, 9, 12, 14)
- Maddie Harmon – Noah Kahan vocal recording assistance (track 12)
- Alyson McAnally – production coordination

=== Visuals ===
- P Tracy – art direction, design, packaging
- Ashley Kohorst – art production
- MC Demetriades – art production
- Nyk Allen – photography
- Kelsey Deenihan – hair and makeup
- Brittany Leslie – hair and makeup assistance
- Danielle Priano – hair
- Rob Zangardi – styling
- Mariel Haenn – styling
- Jill Petry – styling assistance

== Charts ==
=== Weekly charts ===
Weekly chart performance for Patterns
Chart (2024)	Peak position
Australian Albums (ARIA)	48
Australian Country Albums (ARIA)	4
Canadian Albums (Billboard)	22
Scottish Albums (OCC)	46
UK Album Downloads (OCC)	9
UK Albums Sales (OCC)	34
UK Country Albums (OCC)	1
UK Independent Albums (OCC)	14
US Billboard 200	4
US Independent Albums (Billboard)	1
US Top Country Albums (Billboard)	1

=== Year-end charts ===
2024 year-end chart performance for Patterns
Chart (2024)	Position
Australian Country Albums (ARIA)	83

2025 year-end chart performance for Patterns
Chart (2025)	Position
US Top Country Albums (Billboard)	50

== Accolades ==
Year-end lists
Publication	Rank	List
Holler	4	The 25 Best Country Albums of 2024
Rolling Stone	16	The 30 Best Country Albums of 2024
