= Cowboys Cry Too =

Single by Kelsea Ballerini and Noah Kahan

from the album Patterns
- Released: June 28, 2024
- Genre: Country
- Length: 3:50
- Label: Black River
- Songwriters: Kelsea Ballerini; Noah Kahan; Alysa Vanderheym
- Producers: Kelsea Ballerini; Alysa Vanderheym

Kelsea Ballerini singles chronology
"Blindsided" (2023)	"Cowboys Cry Too" (2024)	"Baggage" (2025)

Noah Kahan singles chronology
"Forever" (2024)	"Cowboys Cry Too" (2024)	"Up All Night" (2024)

"Cowboys Cry Too" is a song by American singer-songwriters Kelsea Ballerini and Noah Kahan. It was released on June 28, 2024, as the lead single from Ballerini's fifth studio album, Patterns. Ballerini and Kahan co-wrote the song with Alysa Vanderheym, who also co-produced the track with Ballerini. The song was nominated for the Grammy Award for Best Country Duo/Group Performance, the Country Music Association Award for Musical Event of the Year, and the Academy of Country Music Award for Music Event of the Year.

== Content ==
Ballerini wrote the chorus of "Cowboys Cry Too" in November 2023 on her back porch, before coming to the conclusion that the song needed a male's perspective to bring it to the next level. She first met Noah Kahan at the 66th Annual Grammy Awards on February 4, 2024, where he complimented her songwriting skills for her 2016 single, "Peter Pan", and she described their connection as "songwriter synergy". She later sent a DM to Kahan to suggest he collaborate on the track with her. He wrote his part while on tour, and the two united with Alysa Vanderheym in the studio to record the song shortly before they performed a mashup of "Stick Season" and "Mountain with a View" together on the 59th Academy of Country Music Awards on May 16, 2024.

Lyrically, the song is written from a female perspective addressing the concept of toxic masculinity, with Ballerini saying that "in our world and culture and echo chamber of highlight reels and pretty things, sometimes real feelings start to feel like something you just set aside or push down to keep up. Especially the way so many men grow up, that kind of toxic masculinity mindset of 'saddle up, brush it off'. I wanted to write my perspective and essentially celebrate the vulnerable men in my life, and Noah adding his really unfiltered perspective into it just brought it to life in a more meaningful and beautiful way." She described the song as a way to honor "the men in [her] life that are emotional".

Ballerini announced that her fifth studio album was already finished at the time of the release of "Cowboys Cry Too" and that the song would be the only collaboration on the record.

== Critical reception ==
Taste of Country placed "Cowboys Cry Too" at number 31 on its list of the Top 40 Country Songs of 2024.

== Commercial performance ==
"Cowboys Cry Too" was the most-added song at the country radio format upon release, and debuted at number 27 on the Billboard Country Airplay dated for July 6, 2024, and at number 16 on the Billboard Hot Country Songs chart the following week. It debuted at number 50 on the Billboard Hot 100 chart, Ballerini's highest debut on the chart to date.

== Charts ==
=== Weekly charts ===
Weekly chart performance for "Cowboys Cry Too"
Chart (2024–2025)	Peak position
Canada Hot 100 (Billboard)	49
Canada Country (Billboard)	36
Global 200 (Billboard)	173
UK Singles (OCC)	84
UK Country Airplay (Radiomonitor)	1
US Billboard Hot 100	50
US Country Airplay (Billboard)	24
US Hot Country Songs (Billboard)	16

=== Year-end charts ===
2024 year-end chart performance for "Cowboys Cry Too"
Chart (2024)	Position
US Hot Country Songs (Billboard)	87

2025 year-end chart performance for "Cowboys Cry Too"
Chart (2025)	Position
US Hot Country Songs (Billboard)	85

== Certifications ==
Certifications for "Cowboys Cry Too"
Region	Certification	Certified units/sales
Canada (Music Canada)	Gold	40,000^{‡}
^{‡} Sales+streaming figures based on certification alone.
