= The Voice (American TV series) season 23 =

The Voice
- Season 23
- Promotional poster featuring coaches Clarkson, Shelton, Horan, and Chance the Rapper
- Hosted by: Carson Daly
- Coaches: Kelly Clarkson; Chance the Rapper; Niall Horan; Blake Shelton
- No. of contestants: 40 artists
- Winner: Gina Miles
- Winning coach: Niall Horan
- Runner-up: Grace West
- No. of episodes: 19

Release
- Original network: NBC
- Original release: March 6 – May 23, 2023

Season chronology
- ← Previous; Season 22 Next → Season 24

The twenty-third season of the American reality television series The Voice premiered on March 6, 2023, on NBC. The season is presented by Carson Daly, who returned for his twenty-third season as host. The panel of coaches for the season consists of Blake Shelton, who returned for his twenty-third and final season as a coach; returning coach Kelly Clarkson, who returned for her ninth season after a one-season hiatus; and debuting coaches Chance the Rapper and Niall Horan.

Gina Miles was named the winner of the season, with the closest margin to-date, marking Niall Horan's first win as a coach, with Horan becoming the third new coach, after Kelly Clarkson and John Legend, to win on his debut season, as well as the youngest coach to win a season.

== Overview ==
=== Development ===
On October 11, 2022, NBC announced that the show would be returning for a twenty-third season to be aired in spring 2023. Previously, it was announced that, beginning with the 2021–22 United States network television schedule, only one season would be produced per cyclical year, though it was reported that this decision was reversed upon the announcement of the season. Later, it was announced that the season would air on March 6.

=== Coaches and host ===
Coaches and Host of The Voice Season 23

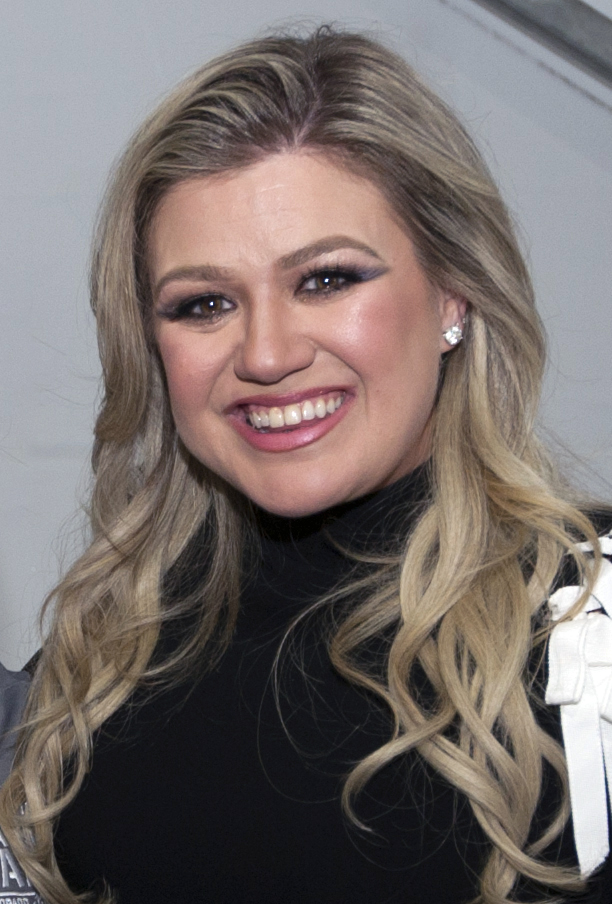
Kelly Clarkson

Chance the Rapper

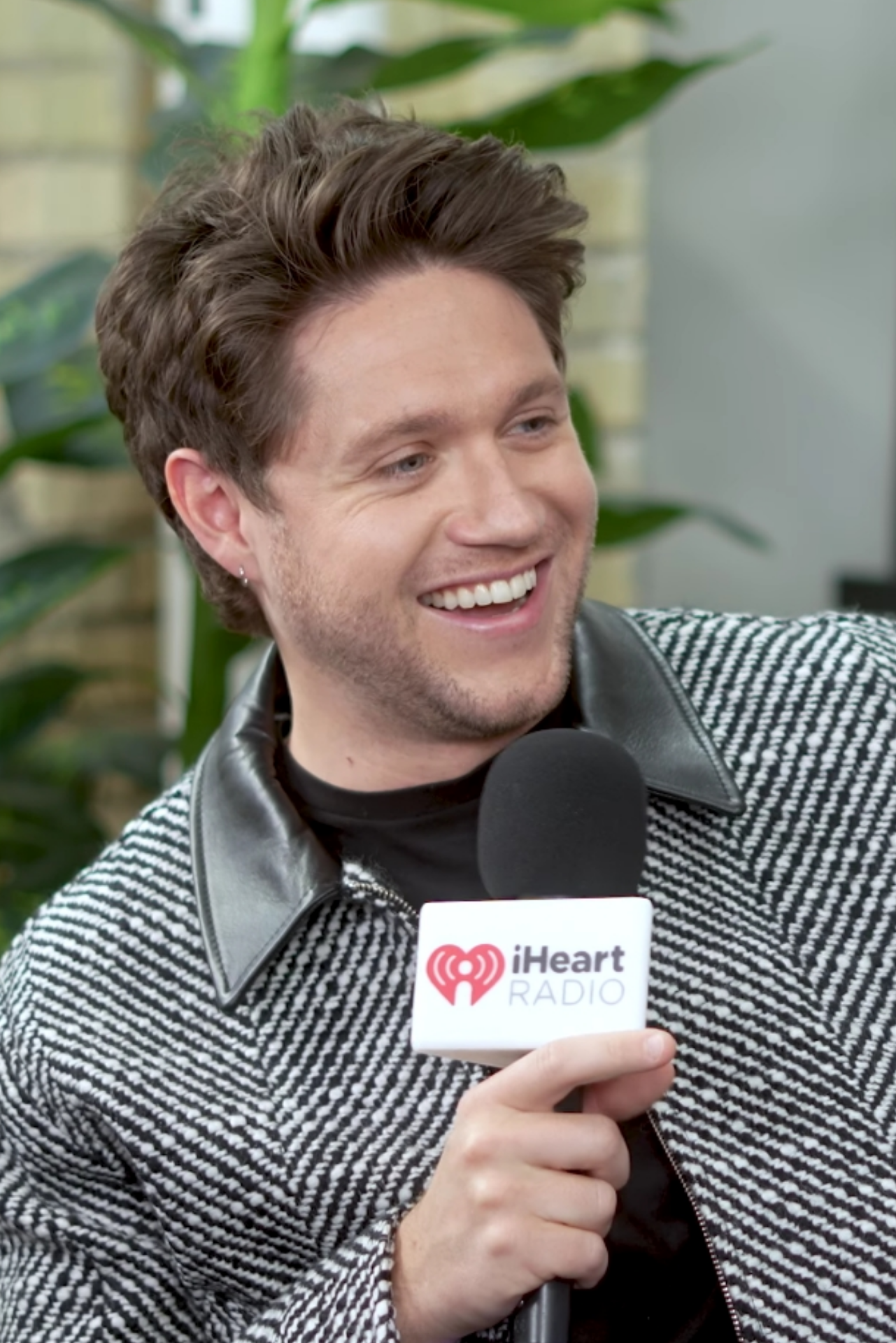
Niall Horan

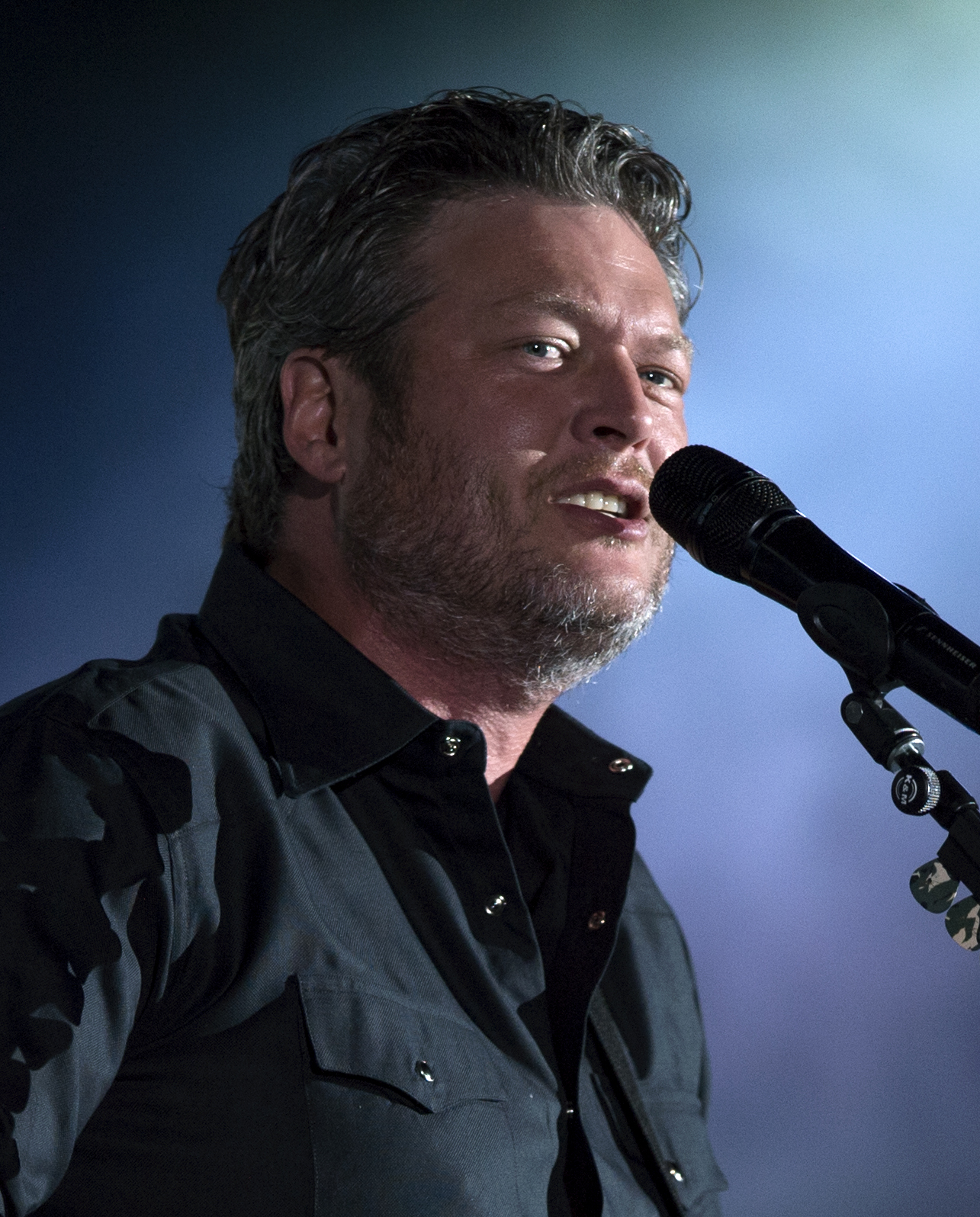
Blake Shelton

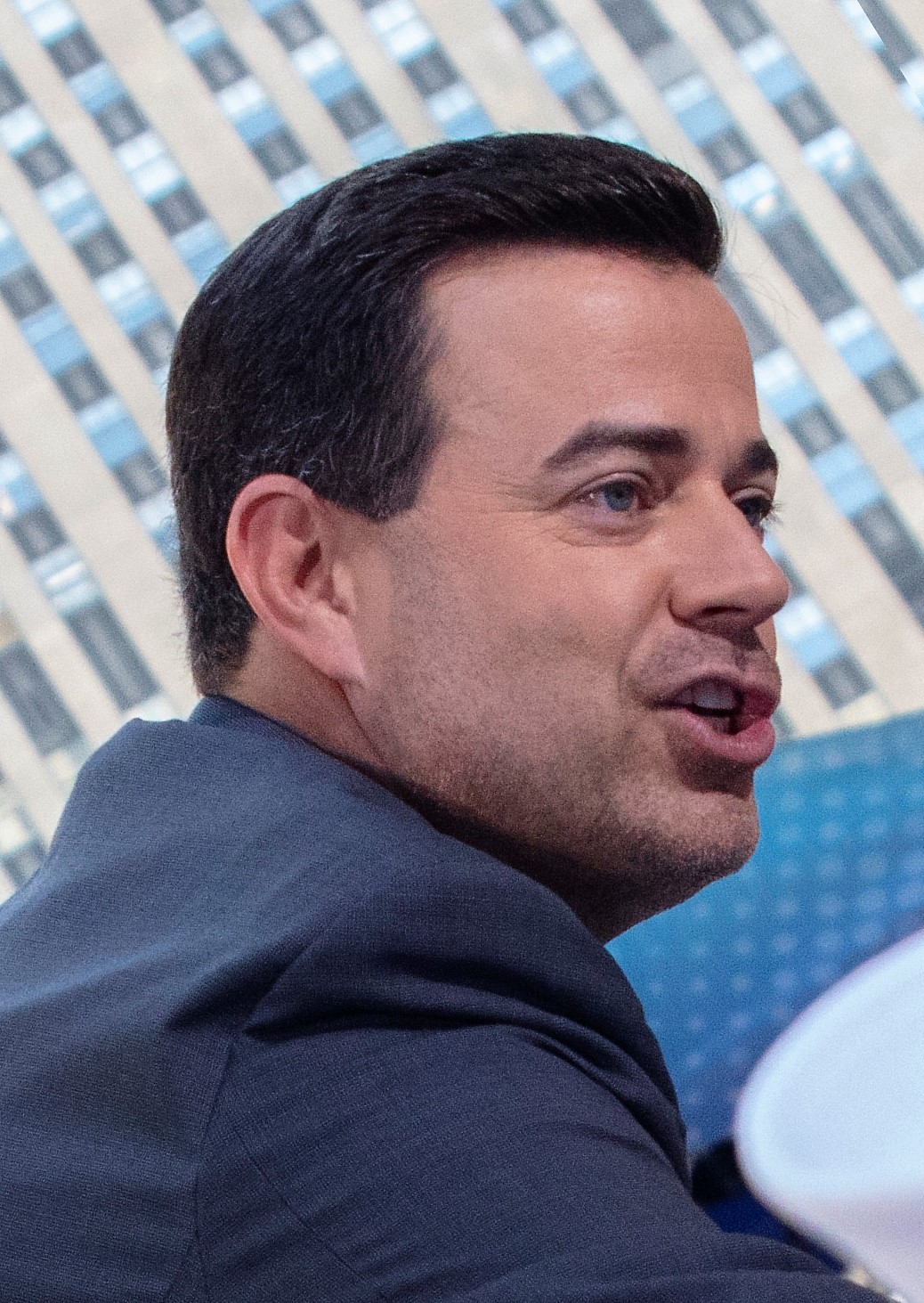
Carson Daly

Out of the four coaches that appeared in the previous season, only Blake Shelton returned, which marks his twenty-third season as a coach. It was also announced that Shelton would be departing from the show at the end of the season after having been a coach since its inaugural season, though he has not ruled out a return as a guest mentor. This is the first season in which only one coach from the previous season returns.

Kelly Clarkson returns to the coaching panel for her ninth season, following her absence in the previous season. The season introduces two debuting coaches for the first time since season 11; the new coaches are rapper and singer-songwriter Chance the Rapper, and singer-songwriter and former One Direction member Niall Horan. The three judges replaced John Legend, Gwen Stefani, and Camila Cabello, all of whom had exited the panel for this season.

Carson Daly returned for his twenty-third season as the host.

=== Mega mentor ===
On February 22, 2023, it was announced that Reba McEntire would appear as the season's mega mentor for the Knockouts. McEntire previously appeared in the show as the battle advisor for Team Blake on the show's inaugural season and as an advisor for all teams during the Top 12 live shows on season 8. In the battles, there were no guest battle advisors, which meant the artists were mentored for the battles solely by their coaches for the first time in the show's history.

=== Additions and changes ===
The season introduced the "Playoff Pass" in the battles round. A replacement to the "save" from seasons 14 to 22, the "pass" allows each coach to advance further both artists of a battle; while one will still advance to the knockouts, the recipient of the "pass" will bypass the knockouts and go directly to the playoffs, creating a total of twenty contestants advancing to the playoffs. In the playoffs, only two members per team will advance to the Live Top 8 Semi-finals, as chosen by their respective coaches. The round will be prerecorded for the third time since season 6.

=== Promotion ===
NBC released its first advert for the season on December 13, 2022. On March 2, 2023, the show, via its online platforms, released the coaches' cover of Frankie Valli's "Can't Take My Eyes Off You."

Shortly prior to the season premiere, the show, via its online platforms, released the blind audition of Noivas performing Sam Cooke's "A Change is Gonna Come." Later episodes saw the auditions of Sheer Element (Jej Vinson, Tabon Ward, and Izzy Kaye), Ryley Tate Wilson, Mary Kate Connor, Cait Martin, and NariYella released online as a sneak peak for their respective episodes.

== Teams ==
Teams color key
| Winner | Eliminated in the Playoffs |
| Runner-up | Stolen in the Knockouts |
| Third place | Eliminated in the Knockouts |
| Fourth place | Stolen in the Battles |
| Fifth place | Eliminated in the Battles |
| Eliminated in Live Semi-final | Contestant withdrew |

Coaches' teams
| Coach | Top 40 Artists | | | |
|---|---|---|---|---|
| Kelly Clarkson | | | | |
| Kelly Clarkson | D.Smooth | Holly Brand | Ali | Cait Martin |
| Kelly Clarkson | Neil Salsich | ~~Kala Banham~~ | ~~Rachel Christine~~ | Marcos Covos |
| Kelly Clarkson | Katie Beth Forakis | Allie Keck | Sheer Element | JB Somers |
| Chance the Rapper | | | | |
| Chance the Rapper | Sorelle | Ray Uriel | Kala Banham | Jamar Langley |
| Chance the Rapper | Manasseh Samone | Tiana Goss | Magnus | NariYella |
| Chance the Rapper | ~~Noivas~~ | Chloe Abbott | Mariah Kalia | Alyssa Lazar |
| Niall Horan | | | | |
| Niall Horan | Gina Miles | Ryley Tate Wilson | Michael B. | Ross Clayton |
| Niall Horan | Tasha Jessen | Kate Cosentino | Jerome Godwin III | EJ Michels |
| Niall Horan | ~~Kala Banham~~ | ~~Tiana Goss~~ | Laura Littleton | Talia Smith |
| Blake Shelton | | | | |
| Blake Shelton | Grace West | Noivas | Rachel Christine | Mary Kate Connor |
| Blake Shelton | Kylee Dayne | ~~Tasha Jessen~~ | ~~Neil Salsich~~ | Walker Wilson |
| Blake Shelton | ~~EJ Michels~~ | Kason Lester | Carlos Rising | Alex Whalen |
Note: Italicized names are artists stolen from another team during the battles or the knockouts (names struck through within former teams). Underlined names are artists who received a "playoff pass" from their coach.

== Blind auditions ==
The show began with the blind auditions that began airing on March 6, and aired through March 21, 2023, comprising episodes one to six. In each audition, an artist sings their piece in front of the coaches whose chairs are facing the audience. If a coach is interested to work with the artist, they will press their button to face the artist. If a singular coach presses the button, the artist automatically becomes part of their team. If multiple coaches turn, they will compete for the artist, who will decide which team they will join.

Each coach had one "block" to prevent another coach from getting an artist. At the end of the round, each coach formed a team of ten artists, creating a total of 40 artists advancing to the battles. Among the 40 contestants, two were trios (Sorelle, Sheer Element).

Blind auditions color key
| ✔ | Coach hit his/her "I WANT YOU" button. |
| | Artist defaulted to this coach's team. |
| | Artist selected to join this coach's team. |
| | Artist was eliminated with no coach pressing their button. |
| ✘ | Coach pressed "I WANT YOU" button, but was blocked by another coach from getting the artist. |
| | Blocked by Kelly; Blocked by Chance; Blocked by Niall; Blocked by Blake |

=== Episode 1 (March 6) ===
Among the auditionees this episode was Miss Mississippi 2021 Holly Brand, and former two-time American Idol contestant Savion Wright, who auditioned in this season as Noivas (stylized in all caps).

First blind auditions results
| Order | Artist | Age | Hometown | Song | Coach's and artist's choices | | | |
| Order | Artist | Age | Hometown | Song | Kelly | Chance | Niall | Blake |
|---|---|---|---|---|---|---|---|---|
| 1 | Neil Salsich | 34 | St. Louis, Missouri | "Honky Tonk Blues" | ✘ | ✔ | ✔ | ✔ |
| 2 | Sorelle (Madi, Ana, and Bella Heichel) | 15–21 | Lexington, Ohio | "Good Old-Fashioned Lover Boy" | – | ✔ | – | ✔ |
| 3 | Holly Brand | 22 | Meridian, Mississippi | "Mississippi Girl" | ✔ | ✔ | ✔ | – |
| 4 | Tasha Jessen | 20 | Colorado Springs, Colorado | "River" | – | ✔ | ✔ | ✔ |
| 5 | Star Martin | 34 | St. Thomas, U.S. Virgin Islands | "No Woman, No Cry" | – | – | – | – |
| 6 | Ross Clayton | 33 | McLoud, Oklahoma | "Blue Ain't Your Color" | ✔ | ✔ | ✔ | ✔ |
| 7 | Michael B. (Michael B. Williams) | 29 | Tulsa, Oklahoma | "Save Your Tears" | – | – | ✔ | – |
| 8 | D.Smooth (David Mitchell) | 25 | Birmingham, Alabama | "Perfect" | ✔ | – | ✔ | – |
| 9 | Emily Rhyne | 22 | Ada, Oklahoma | "The First Cut Is the Deepest" | – | – | – | – |
| 10 | Alex Whalen | 43 | Indian Rocks Beach, Florida | "Help Me Make It Through the Night" | – | ✔ | – | ✔ |
| 11 | Noivas (Savion Wright) | 30 | Jasper, Texas | "A Change Is Gonna Come" | ✔ | ✔ | ✔ | ✘ |

=== Episode 2 (March 7) ===
Among the auditionees this episode was Sheer Element, which included season 16 contestant Jej Vinson, who competed as part of Team Kelly until his elimination in the fourth week of that season's live shows. Vinson's reappearance as part of the trio marked the first time that a former contestant, who advanced to the battles, returned to compete in a later season.

At the end of the five blind auditions, Jimmy Fallon made a guest appearance singing "I Keep Forgettin' (Every Time You're Near)."

Second blind auditions results
| Order | Artist | Age | Hometown | Song | Coach's and artist's choices | | | |
| Order | Artist | Age | Hometown | Song | Kelly | Chance | Niall | Blake |
|---|---|---|---|---|---|---|---|---|
| 1 | Sheer Element (Jej Vinson, Izzy Kaye, and Tabon Ward) | 24–26 | Los Angeles, California | "Leave the Door Open" | ✔ | ✔ | ✔ | – |
| 2 | Carlos Rising | 28 | Wilmington, North Carolina | "Change the World" | ✔ | – | – | ✔ |
| 3 | Alex Graham | 24 | Belmont, North Carolina | "She Had Me at Heads Carolina" | – | – | – | – |
| 4 | Magnus (Magnus Martin) | 25 | Virginia Beach, Virginia | "Sara Smile" | – | ✔ | – | – |
| 5 | Kala Banham | 24 | Windermere, Florida | "Both Sides, Now" | ✘ | ✔ | ✔ | – |

=== Episode 3 (March 13) ===
Among the auditionees this episode was Manasseh Samone, who previously auditioned unsuccessfully in the previous season.

Third blind auditions results
| Order | Artist | Age | Hometown | Song | Coach's and artist's choices | | | |
| Order | Artist | Age | Hometown | Song | Kelly | Chance | Niall | Blake |
|---|---|---|---|---|---|---|---|---|
| 1 | Ryley Tate Wilson | 15 | Montgomery, Alabama | "Dancing on My Own" | ✔ | ✔ | ✔ | ✔ |
| 2 | Jamar Langley | 36 | Andrews, South Carolina | "Try Me" | – | ✔ | – | ✔ |
| 3 | Allie Keck | 28 | Neoga, Illinois | "Paris (Ooh La La)" | ✔ | – | – | ✔ |
| 4 | Jayda Klink | 23 | Cincinnati, Ohio | "No Air" | – | – | – | – |
| 5 | Walker Wilson | 24 | Alcoa, Tennessee | "Hurricane" | – | – | – | ✔ |
| 6 | Ali (Alyssa Lauryn Ibarra) | 24 | Walnut, California | "Killing Me Softly with His Song" | ✔ | ✔ | – | – |
| 7 | Manasseh Samone | 22 | Dallas, Texas | "Rise Up" | – | ✔ | – | – |
| 8 | Jerome Godwin III | 20 | Ashford, Alabama | "pov" | ✔ | – | ✔ | – |
| 9 | EJ Michels | 31 | Draper, Utah | "Easy on Me" | – | ✔ | – | ✔ |
| 10 | Sophia Hoffman | 18 | Chula Vista, California | "Amor Eterno" | – | – | – | – |
| 11 | Laura Littleton | 26 | Dickson, Tennessee | "Sign of the Times" | ✔ | – | ✔ | ✘ |

=== Episode 4 (March 14) ===
Among the auditionees this episode was Tiana Goss, who previously auditioned unsuccessfully in the previous season.

Fourth blind auditions results
| Order | Artist | Age | Hometown | Song | Coach's and artist's choices | | | |
| Order | Artist | Age | Hometown | Song | Kelly | Chance | Niall | Blake |
|---|---|---|---|---|---|---|---|---|
| 1 | Kate Cosentino | 23 | Kansas City, Missouri | "I Say a Little Prayer" | ✔ | ✔ | ✔ | – |
| 2 | Al Boogie | 37 | Gonzales, Louisiana | "T-R-O-U-B-L-E" | – | – | – | – |
| 3 | Chloe Abbott | 24 | Detroit, Michigan | "How Deep Is Your Love" | – | ✔ | – | – |
| 4 | Marcos Covos | 30 | Odessa, Texas | "Tú, sólo tú" | ✔ | – | – | ✔ |
| 5 | Tiana Goss | 29 | Los Angeles, California | "Emotion" | – | – | ✔ | – |
| 6 | Mary Kate Connor | 17 | Ashburn, Virginia | "Stars" | ✔ | – | – | ✔ |

=== Episode 5 (March 20) ===
Among the auditionees this episode was Kason Lester, who previously competed on the seventeenth season of American Idol.

Fifth blind auditions results
| Order | Artist | Age | Hometown | Song | Coach's and artist's choices | | | |
| Order | Artist | Age | Hometown | Song | Kelly | Chance | Niall | Blake |
|---|---|---|---|---|---|---|---|---|
| 1 | Mariah Kalia | 17 | Jacksonville, Florida | "Idontwannabeyouanymore" | – | ✔ | ✔ | – |
| 2 | Kylee Dayne | 19 | Carrollton, Texas | "Fallingwater" | – | ✔ | ✔ | ✔ |
| 3 | Joe with the Flow (Joseph Ellison) | 26 | Atlanta, Georgia | "Mystery of Love" | – | – | – | – |
| 4 | Gina Miles | 18 | Paxton, Illinois | "The One That Got Away" | ✔ | – | ✔ | – |
| 5 | Kason Lester | 33 | Lebanon, Tennessee | "It's Not Over" | – | – | – | ✔ |
| 6 | JB Somers | 31 | Montgomery, Alabama | "A Case of You" | ✔ | ✔ | – | – |
| 7 | Alison Bailey | 17 | Winchester, California | "Rescue" | – | – | – | – |
| 8 | Ray Uriel | 24 | Gary, Indiana | "Glimpse of Us" | – | ✔ | – | – |
| 9 | Alyssa Lazar | 24 | Scranton, Pennsylvania | "Maybe I'm Amazed" | – | ✔ | – | – |
| 10 | Rachel Christine | 22 | Delavan, Wisconsin | "Uninvited" | ✔ | ✔ | – | – |
| 11 | Domenica Coka | 23 | Miami, Florida | "When I Look at You" | – | – | – | – |
| 12 | Cait Martin | 32 | Atlanta, Georgia | "As It Was" | ✔ | ✔ | ✔ | ✔ |

=== Episode 6 (March 21) ===
Among the auditionees this episode was Dasha, who previously competed in the seventh season of The Voice Russia under her real name, Daria Grossman.

Sixth blind auditions results
| Order | Artist | Age | Hometown | Song | Coach's and artist's choices | | | |
| Order | Artist | Age | Hometown | Song | Kelly | Chance | Niall | Blake |
|---|---|---|---|---|---|---|---|---|
| 1 | NariYella | 20 | Elkins Park, Pennsylvania | "One Night Only" | ✔ | ✔ | ✔ | ✔ |
| 2 | Grace West | 19 | Canton, Michigan | "Maybe It Was Memphis" | – | Team full | ✔ | ✔ |
| 3 | Michael Landingham | 29 | Cherry Valley, California | "Wish I Knew You" | – | Team full | – | Team full |
| 4 | Katie Beth Forakis | 25 | Savannah, Tennessee | "Ghost" | ✔ | Team full | ✔ | Team full |
| 5 | Dasha (Daria Grossman) | 21 | Los Angeles, California | "I Can't Stand the Rain" | Team full | Team full | – | Team full |
| 6 | Talia Smith | 29 | Queens, New York | "Don't You Worry 'bout a Thing" | Team full | Team full | ✔ | Team full |

== Battles ==
The second stage of the show, the Battles, aired from March 27 through April 4, 2023, comprising episodes seven through ten. In this round, the coaches pitted two of their artists in a singing match and then select one of them to advance to the next round. For the first time in the show's history, there were no guest advisors for the battles, which meant the artists were mentored solely by their coaches.

Losing artists may be "stolen" by another coach, becoming new members of their team; or can receive a "playoff pass" from their coach, remaining a part of their original team and directly advancing to the playoffs. The four coaches are allowed to either offer a playoff pass or to steal a losing artist in a battle; however, if a coach uses their playoff pass, it overrides the steals.

At the end of this round, seven artists remained on each team. Five were the battle winners, one was stolen from another coach, and one received a playoff pass. In total, 24 artists advanced to the knockouts, while four artists directly advanced to the playoffs.

In episode ten, Alex Whalen from Team Blake left the show due to undisclosed personal reasons; his opponent, Neil Salsich, performed alone and advanced to the knockouts by default. This was the first withdrawal on the show during the Battles since Hannah Goebel's withdrawal in the fourteenth season and the first overall withdrawal from the show since Cody Ray Raymond's withdrawal from the Knockouts in the fifteenth season.

Battles color key
| Artist won the battle and advanced to the knockouts. |
| Artist who was stolen by another coach, and advanced to the knockouts. |
| Artist who received a "playoff pass" from their coach, and advanced to playoffs. |
| Artist lost the battle and was eliminated. |

Battles results
| Episode | Coach | Order | Winner | Song | Loser | 'Steal'/'Pass' result | | | |
| Episode | Coach | Order | Winner | Song | Loser | Kelly | Chance | Niall | Blake |
|---|---|---|---|---|---|---|---|---|---|
| Episode 7 (Monday, March 27, 2023) | Blake | 1 | Tasha Jessen | "The Tracks of My Tears" | EJ Michels | – | ✔ | ✔ | – |
| Episode 7 (Monday, March 27, 2023) | Chance | 2 | Jamar Langley | "Gravity" | Mariah Kalia | – | – | N/A | – |
| Episode 7 (Monday, March 27, 2023) | Niall | 3 | Gina Miles | "Skinny Love" | Kala Banham | ✔ | – | – | – |
| Episode 7 (Monday, March 27, 2023) | Kelly | 4 | Cait Martin | "It Must Have Been Love" | Allie Keck | – | – | N/A | – |
| Episode 7 (Monday, March 27, 2023) | Blake | 5 | Walker Wilson | "Here Without You" | Kason Lester | N/A | – | N/A | – |
| Episode 7 (Monday, March 27, 2023) | Chance | 6 | Sorelle | "Someone like You" | Manasseh Samone | N/A | ✔ | N/A | – |
| Episode 8 (Tuesday, March 28, 2023) | Niall | 1 | Ross Clayton | "Stop Draggin' My Heart Around" | Laura Littleton | N/A | – | – | – |
| Episode 8 (Tuesday, March 28, 2023) | Chance | 2 | Magnus | "Your Song" | Alyssa Lazar | N/A | N/A | N/A | – |
| Episode 8 (Tuesday, March 28, 2023) | Kelly | 3 | Marcos Covos | "I Could Fall in Love" | Sheer Element | – | – | N/A | – |
| Episode 8 (Tuesday, March 28, 2023) | Blake | 4 | Kylee Dayne | "Anti-Hero" | Mary Kate Connor | N/A | – | N/A | ✔ |
| Episode 9 (Monday, April 3, 2023) | Kelly | 1 | Ali | "Unaware" | D.Smooth | ✔ | ✔ | N/A | – |
| Episode 9 (Monday, April 3, 2023) | Blake | 2 | Grace West | "I Told You So" | Carlos Rising | Team full | – | N/A | N/A |
| Episode 9 (Monday, April 3, 2023) | Niall | 3 | Kate Cosentino | "Girls Just Want to Have Fun" | Tiana Goss | Team full | ✔ | – | – |
| Episode 9 (Monday, April 3, 2023) | Kelly | 4 | Holly Brand | "Lady Like" | Katie Beth Forakis | Team full | Team full | N/A | – |
| Episode 9 (Monday, April 3, 2023) | Chance | 5 | NariYella | "I Want You Around" | Chloe Abbott | Team full | Team full | N/A | – |
| Episode 9 (Monday, April 3, 2023) | Niall | 6 | Michael B. | "Heartbreak Anniversary" | Ryley Tate Wilson | Team full | Team full | ✔ | – |
| Episode 10 (Tuesday, April 4, 2023) | Niall | 1 | Jerome Godwin III | "Like I Can" | Talia Smith | Team full | Team full | Team full | – |
| Episode 10 (Tuesday, April 4, 2023) | Kelly | 2 | Rachel Christine | "Light On" | JB Somers | Team full | Team full | Team full | – |
| Episode 10 (Tuesday, April 4, 2023) | Blake | 3 | Neil Salsich (Note: Neil Salsich and Alex Whalen were initially paired against one another; however, Whalen withdrew before the battles. As a result, Salsich performed the song alone and advanced to the knockouts by default.) | "I Heard It Through the Grapevine" | Alex Whalen | Team full | Team full | Team full | N/A |
| Episode 10 (Tuesday, April 4, 2023) | Chance | 4 | Ray Uriel | "Jealous Guy" | Noivas | Team full | Team full | Team full | ✔ |
| Episode 11 (Monday, April 10, 2023) | | The eleventh episode was a special episode titled "Best of the Blinds, Battles, and Blake". It aired select blind auditions and battle performances from the season. | | | | | | | |

== Knockouts ==
The third stage of the show, the knockouts, aired from April 17 through April 24, comprising episodes 12 and 13. Reba McEntire served as the season's mega mentor for the round.

Each coach paired two of their artists in a singing match. The artists themselves select the song they sing in the round, and the coach then selects one of them to advance to the playoffs. Each coach can steal one losing artist from another team.

At the end of this round, three artists were the Knockout winners, four artists were stolen, and four artists were already recipients of the "playoff pass" from the Battles, creating a total of twenty artists advancing to the playoffs.

Knockouts color key
| Artist won the knockout and advanced to the playoffs. |
| Artist who was stolen by another coach, and advanced to the playoffs. |
| Artist lost the knockout and was eliminated. |

Knockouts results
| Episode | Coach | Order | Song | Artists | | Song | 'Steal' result | | | |
| Episode | Coach | Order | Song | Winner | Loser | Song | Kelly | Chance | Niall | Blake |
|---|---|---|---|---|---|---|---|---|---|---|
| Episode 12 (Monday, April 17, 2023) | Blake | 1 | "I Put a Spell on You" | Noivas | Tasha Jessen | "Take Me to Church" | – | – | ✔ | N/A |
| Episode 12 (Monday, April 17, 2023) | Kelly | 2 | "Best Part" | Ali | Marcos Covos | "Jesus, Take the Wheel" | N/A | – | Team full | – |
| Episode 12 (Monday, April 17, 2023) | Niall | 3 | "Somebody That I Used to Know" | Gina Miles | Kate Cosentino | "Call Me" | – | – | Team full | – |
| Episode 12 (Monday, April 17, 2023) | Chance | 4 | "Lately" | Ray Uriel | NariYella | "Bust Your Windows" | – | N/A | Team full | – |
| Episode 12 (Monday, April 17, 2023) | Blake | 5 | "All by Myself" | Kylee Dayne | Walker Wilson | "I Ain't Living Long Like This" | – | – | Team full | N/A |
| Episode 12 (Monday, April 17, 2023) | Kelly | 6 | "All the Man That I Need" | Cait Martin | Kala Banham | "Iris" | N/A | ✔ | Team full | ✔ |
| Episode 13 (Monday, April 24, 2023) | Niall | 1 | "When You're Gone" | Michael B. | EJ Michels | "Trip Switch" | – | Team full | Team full | – |
| Episode 13 (Monday, April 24, 2023) | Chance | 2 | "Cruisin'" | Jamar Langley | Magnus | "Ordinary People" | – | Team full | Team full | – |
| Episode 13 (Monday, April 24, 2023) | Blake | 3 | "Here You Come Again" | Grace West | Neil Salsich | "Takin' It to the Streets" | ✔ | Team full | Team full | N/A |
| Episode 13 (Monday, April 24, 2023) | Niall | 4 | "Dirty Work" | Ross Clayton | Jerome Godwin III | "Someone You Loved" | Team full | Team full | Team full | – |
| Episode 13 (Monday, April 24, 2023) | Chance | 5 | "Blame It on the Boogie" | Sorelle | Tiana Goss | "God Is a Woman" | Team full | Team full | Team full | – |
| Episode 13 (Monday, April 24, 2023) | Kelly | 6 | "Blue Moon of Kentucky" | Holly Brand | Rachel Christine | "Rhiannon" | Team full | Team full | Team full | ✔ |

== Playoffs ==
The fourth stage of the show, the playoffs, aired from May 1 through May 8, comprising episodes 14 and 15. The top 20 artists performed for the coaches with a song of their choosing, with each coach selecting two of their artists to advance to the top eight semi-finals.

This was the first playoffs to not be contested live since season 13; it was prerecorded and taped at the same stage as the prior two rounds, hence the lack of an interactive viewer voting component or a subsequent results episode. Teams Blake and Chance performed on the first episode, while Teams Kelly and Niall performed in the second episode.

Playoffs color key
| Artist was chosen by their coach to move on to the live semi-finals. |
| Artist was eliminated. |

Playoffs results
| Episode | Coach | Order | Artist | Song | Result |
|---|---|---|---|---|---|
| Episode 14 (Monday, May 1, 2023) | Blake Shelton | 1 | Noivas | "Come Together" | Advanced |
| Episode 14 (Monday, May 1, 2023) | Chance the Rapper | 2 | Kala Banham | "My Funny Valentine" | Eliminated |
| Episode 14 (Monday, May 1, 2023) | Blake Shelton | 3 | Rachel Christine | "The Only Exception" | Eliminated |
| Episode 14 (Monday, May 1, 2023) | Chance the Rapper | 4 | Jamar Langley | "The Thrill Is Gone" | Eliminated |
| Episode 14 (Monday, May 1, 2023) | Blake Shelton | 5 | Grace West | "Love Is Alive" | Advanced |
| Episode 14 (Monday, May 1, 2023) | Chance the Rapper | 6 | Manasseh Samone | "Speak the Name" | Eliminated |
| Episode 14 (Monday, May 1, 2023) | Blake Shelton | 7 | Kylee Dayne | "Flowers" | Eliminated |
| Episode 14 (Monday, May 1, 2023) | Chance the Rapper | 8 | Ray Uriel | "Essence" | Advanced |
| Episode 14 (Monday, May 1, 2023) | Blake Shelton | 9 | Mary Kate Connor | "If I Die Young" | Eliminated |
| Episode 14 (Monday, May 1, 2023) | Chance the Rapper | 10 | Sorelle | "Something's Got a Hold on Me" | Advanced |
| Episode 15 (Monday, May 8, 2023) | Kelly Clarkson | 1 | D.Smooth | "Location" | Advanced |
| Episode 15 (Monday, May 8, 2023) | Niall Horan | 2 | Ross Clayton | "With or Without You" | Eliminated |
| Episode 15 (Monday, May 8, 2023) | Kelly Clarkson | 3 | Cait Martin | "Alone" | Eliminated |
| Episode 15 (Monday, May 8, 2023) | Niall Horan | 4 | Gina Miles | "Wicked Game" | Advanced |
| Episode 15 (Monday, May 8, 2023) | Kelly Clarkson | 5 | Neil Salsich | "Have a Little Faith in Me" | Eliminated |
| Episode 15 (Monday, May 8, 2023) | Niall Horan | 6 | Tasha Jessen | "Here" | Eliminated |
| Episode 15 (Monday, May 8, 2023) | Kelly Clarkson | 7 | Ali | "Never Alone" | Eliminated |
| Episode 15 (Monday, May 8, 2023) | Niall Horan | 8 | Michael B. | "The Joke" | Eliminated |
| Episode 15 (Monday, May 8, 2023) | Kelly Clarkson | 9 | Holly Brand | "Bring On the Rain" | Advanced |
| Episode 15 (Monday, May 8, 2023) | Niall Horan | 10 | Ryley Tate Wilson | "When the Party's Over" | Advanced |

== Live shows ==
=== Week 1: Top 8 – Semi-finals (May 15) ===
The Top 8 performed in one night on Monday, May 15. This season, there were no instant save performances; the public voted to advance five artists to the finale, while eliminating the remaining three from the competition.

This was the first time in The Voice history that both first-time coaches had an artist in the finale. With the advancements of Sorelle and Gina Miles, Chance the Rapper and Niall Horan became the seventh and eighth new coaches to bring their team to the finale, the first being Usher (Michelle Chamuel in season 4), the second being Alicia Keys (Wé McDonald in season 11), the third being Kelly Clarkson (Brynn Cartelli in season 14), the fourth being John Legend (Maelyn Jarmon in season 16), the fifth being Nick Jonas (Thunderstorm Artis in season 18), and the sixth being Camila Cabello (Morgan Myles in season 22).

With the advancement of Sorelle, this is the second time that a trio advanced to the finale, following Girl Named Tom in season 21. (Both Girl Named Tom and Sorelle were from the state of Ohio.)

This was the first time since the twentieth season that all four coaches were represented in the finale.

Live semifinals color key
| Artist was saved by public's vote. |
| Artist was eliminated. |

Semi-finals results
| Episode | Coach | Order | Artist | Song | Result |
|---|---|---|---|---|---|
| Episode 16 (Monday, May 15, 2023) | Niall Horan | 1 | Ryley Tate Wilson | "Vienna" | Eliminated |
| Episode 16 (Monday, May 15, 2023) | Chance the Rapper | 2 | Ray Uriel | "Can You Stand the Rain" | Eliminated |
| Episode 16 (Monday, May 15, 2023) | Kelly Clarkson | 3 | Holly Brand | "Rumor Has It" | Eliminated |
| Episode 16 (Monday, May 15, 2023) | Blake Shelton | 4 | Noivas | "Skyfall" | Public's vote |
| Episode 16 (Monday, May 15, 2023) | Niall Horan | 5 | Gina Miles | "All I Want" | Public's vote |
| Episode 16 (Monday, May 15, 2023) | Chance the Rapper | 6 | Sorelle | "Fallin'" | Public's vote |
| Episode 16 (Monday, May 15, 2023) | Kelly Clarkson | 7 | D.Smooth | "Thinking Out Loud" | Public's vote |
| Episode 16 (Monday, May 15, 2023) | Blake Shelton | 8 | Grace West | "'Til I Can Make It on My Own" | Public's vote |

During the episode, mega mentor Reba McEntire made a guest appearance, where it was revealed that she would replace Blake Shelton as a coach in the next season.

Non-competition performances
| Order | Performers | Song |
|---|---|---|
| 16.1 | Niall Horan | "Meltdown" |
| 16.2 | Chance the Rapper (with Kala Banham, Jamar Langley, and Manasseh Samone) | "Same Drugs" |

=== Week 2: Finale (May 22–23) ===
The season finale ran through two nights, Monday and Tuesday, May 22 through 23, 2023, comprising episodes 17 through 19. The Top 5 performed on Monday, with each artist performing an up-tempo song and a ballad for the title of The Voice. At the episode's conclusion, the overnight voting for the season's winner began. The following night, on Tuesday, the finalists performed a duet with their respective coaches before the results of the public vote were announced, and the winner of the season was named. Before the performances on the second episode, a one-hour episode, titled "Live Cutdown Show", recapping the finalists' performances was aired.

At the end of the show, Gina Miles was named the winner in the closest margin of victory, as noted by Daly, surpassing season 12 between Chris Blue and Lauren Duski. Her victory marks Horan's first victory as a coach, with him becoming the third new coach, after Clarkson with Brynn Cartelli in season 14; and John Legend with Maelyn Jarmon in season 16, to have a winning artist on his first attempt.

Finale results
| Coach | Artist | Episode 17 (Monday, May 22, 2023) | | | | Episode 19 (Tuesday, May 23, 2023) | | Result |
| Coach | Artist | Order | Up-tempo song | Order | Ballad | Order | Duet (with coach) | Result |
|---|---|---|---|---|---|---|---|---|
| Blake Shelton | Grace West | 1 | "The Night the Lights Went Out in Georgia" | 6 | "She's Got You" | 15 | "Lonely Tonight" | Runner-up |
| Kelly Clarkson | D.Smooth | 8 | "What You Won't Do for Love" | 2 | "My, My, My" | 13 | "Slow Dancing in the Dark" | Third place |
| Chance the Rapper | Sorelle | 9 | "Ain't No Mountain High Enough" | 3 | "Million Reasons" | 14 | "O-o-h Child" | Fourth place |
| Blake Shelton | Noivas | 7 | "Fly Away" | 4 | "Cold" | 12 | "Home" | Fifth place |
| Niall Horan | Gina Miles | 5 | "Style" | 10 | "Nothing Compares 2 U" | 11 | "New York State of Mind" | Winner |

Non-competition performances
| Order | Performers | Song |
|---|---|---|
| 17.1 | Alex Newell | "Independently Owned" |
| 17.2 | Lewis Capaldi | "Wish You the Best" |
| 19.1 | CeeLo Green, Chloe Kohanski, bodie, Wendy Moten, and Cam Anthony | "Jack & Diane" "Don't You (Forget About Me)" "Livin' on a Prayer" |
| 19.2 | Toosii | "Favorite Song" |
| 19.3 | Diplo feat. Lily Rose | "Sad in the Summer" |
| 19.4 | U.S. Army Field Band | "I Lived" |
| 19.5 | Maroon 5 | "Middle Ground" |
| 19.6 | Notable Team Blake alumni (Note: The alumni that performed included: Dia Frampton, Xenia, Jermaine Paul, RaeLynn, Cassadee Pope, Danielle Bradbery, The Swon Brothers, Craig Wayne Boyd, Sundance Head, Todd Tilghman, Ian Flanigan, and Bryce Leatherwood.) | "Good Riddance (Time of Your Life)" |

== Elimination chart ==
Results color key
| Winner | Saved by the public |
| Runner-up | Saved by their coach |
| Third place | Eliminated |
| Fourth place |
| Fifth place |

Coaches color key
| Team Kelly |
| Team Chance |
| Team Niall |
| Team Blake |

=== Overall ===
Elimination chart for The Voice season 23
| Artists | Playoffs | Semi-final | Finale |
|---|---|---|---|
| Gina Miles | Safe | Safe | Winner |
| Grace West | Safe | Safe | Runner-up |
| D.Smooth | Safe | Safe | 3rd place |
| Sorelle | Safe | Safe | 4th place |
| Noivas | Safe | Safe | 5th place |
| Holly Brand | Safe | Eliminated | Eliminated (Semi-final) |
| Ryley Tate Wilson | Safe | Eliminated | Eliminated (Semi-final) |
| Ray Uriel | Safe | Eliminated | Eliminated (Semi-final) |
| Ali | Eliminated | Eliminated (Playoffs) | |
| Michael B. | Eliminated | Eliminated (Playoffs) | |
| Kala Banham | Eliminated | Eliminated (Playoffs) | |
| Rachel Christine | Eliminated | Eliminated (Playoffs) | |
| Ross Clayton | Eliminated | Eliminated (Playoffs) | |
| Mary Kate Connor | Eliminated | Eliminated (Playoffs) | |
| Kylee Dayne | Eliminated | Eliminated (Playoffs) | |
| Tasha Jessen | Eliminated | Eliminated (Playoffs) | |
| Jamar Langley | Eliminated | Eliminated (Playoffs) | |
| Cait Martin | Eliminated | Eliminated (Playoffs) | |
| Neil Salsich | Eliminated | Eliminated (Playoffs) | |
| Manasseh Samone | Eliminated | Eliminated (Playoffs) | |

=== Per team ===
Elimination chart for The Voice season 23 per team
| Artists | Playoffs | Semi-final | Finale |
|---|---|---|---|
| D.Smooth | Advanced | Advanced | Third place |
| Holly Brand | Advanced | Eliminated | |
| Ali | Eliminated | | |
| Cait Martin | Eliminated | | |
| Neil Salsich | Eliminated | | |
| Sorelle | Advanced | Advanced | Fourth place |
| Ray Uriel | Advanced | Eliminated | |
| Kala Banham | Eliminated | | |
| Jamar Langley | Eliminated | | |
| Manasseh Samone | Eliminated | | |
| Gina Miles | Advanced | Advanced | Winner |
| Ryley Tate Wilson | Advanced | Eliminated | |
| Michael B. | Eliminated | | |
| Ross Clayton | Eliminated | | |
| Tasha Jessen | Eliminated | | |
| Grace West | Advanced | Advanced | Runner-up |
| Noivas | Advanced | Advanced | Fifth place |
| Rachel Christine | Eliminated | | |
| Mary Kate Connor | Eliminated | | |
| Kylee Dayne | Eliminated | | |

== Ratings ==
Viewership and ratings per episode of The Voice season 23
| No. | Title | Air date | Timeslot (ET) | Rating (18–49) | Viewers (millions) |
|---|---|---|---|---|---|
| 1 | "The Blind Auditions, Season Premiere" | March 6, 2023 | Monday 8:00 p.m. | 0.7 | 6.44 |
| 2 | "The Blind Auditions, Part 2" | March 7, 2023 | Tuesday 9:00 p.m. | 0.5 | 5.12 |
| 3 | "The Blind Auditions, Part 3" | March 13, 2023 | Monday 8:00 p.m. | 0.7 | 6.99 |
| 4 | "The Blind Auditions, Part 4" | March 14, 2023 | Tuesday 9:00 p.m. | 0.5 | 4.97 |
| 5 | "The Blind Auditions, Part 5" | March 20, 2023 | Monday 8:00 p.m. | 0.6 | 6.47 |
| 6 | "The Blind Auditions, Part 6" | March 21, 2023 | Tuesday 9:00 p.m. | 0.5 | 5.27 |
| 7 | "The Battles Premiere" | March 27, 2023 | Monday 8:00 p.m. | 0.6 | 6.32 |
| 8 | "The Battles Part 2" | March 28, 2023 | Tuesday 9:00 p.m. | 0.5 | 5.21 |
| 9 | "The Battles Part 3" | April 3, 2023 | Monday 8:00 p.m. | 0.5 | 5.41 |
| 10 | "The Battles Part 4" | April 4, 2023 | Tuesday 9:00 p.m. | 0.4 | 4.37 |
| 11 | "Best of the Blinds, Battles, and Blake" | April 10, 2023 | Monday 8:00 p.m. | 0.4 | 4.02 |
| 12 | "The Knockouts Premiere" | April 17, 2023 | Monday 8:00 p.m. | 0.5 | 5.36 |
| 13 | "The Knockouts Part 2" | April 24, 2023 | Monday 8:00 p.m. | 0.5 | 5.20 |
| 14 | "The Playoffs Premiere" | May 1, 2023 | Monday 8:00 p.m. | 0.4 | 4.94 |
| 15 | "The Playoffs Part 2" | May 8, 2023 | Monday 8:00 p.m. | 0.5 | 5.47 |
| 16 | "Live Semi-Finals Top 8 Performances" | May 15, 2023 | Monday 8:00 p.m. | 0.6 | 5.57 |
| 17 | "Live Finale, Part 1" | May 22, 2023 | Monday 8:00 p.m. | 0.5 | 5.63 |
| 18 | "Live Cutdown Show" | May 23, 2023 | Tuesday 8:00 p.m. | 0.3 | 4.41 |
| 19 | "Live Finale, Part 2" | May 23, 2023 | Tuesday 9:00 p.m. | 0.5 | 6.21 |
