= 2nd Hanoi International Film Festival =

2012 film festival in Hanoi, Vietnam

- Opening film: Hot Sand (Vietnam)
- Location: Hanoi, Vietnam
- Founded: 2010
- Awards: Best Feature Film: Shackled (Philippines)
- Hosted by: Bình Minh, Hải Vân
- Festival date: November 25–29, 2012
- Website: Website

Hanoi International Film Festival chronology
- 3rd 1st

The 2nd Hanoi International Film Festival opened on November 25 and closed on November 29, 2012 at Hanoi Friendship Cultural Palace, with the slogan "Asia-Pacific cinema unites and develops" (Vietnamese: "Điện ảnh châu Á - Thái Bình Dương thống nhất và phát triển").

A total of 117 films from 31 countries and regions attended the festival after going through the selection round. The number of films participating in the contest was 37, including: 14 feature-length films, 13 short films, five short documentaries and five animated films.

== Programs ==
Main program of activities of the 2nd Hanoi International Film Festival:

Ceremonies - At Hanoi Friendship Cultural Palace, 91 Trần Hưng Đạo Street, Hoàn Kiếm District:

- Opening ceremony: 20:00-21:00, Sunday, November 25 (live broadcast on VTV2, VTV4)
  - Opening screening: 21:00-22:30, Conference Room
- Closing ceremony: 20:00-22:00, Thursday, November 29 (live broadcast on VTV2, VTV4)

Professional Activities - At Hanoi Daewoo Hotel, 360 Kim Mã Street, Ba Đình District:

- Photo Exhibition: Cinema of Vietnam in Renovation Period (Vietnamese: "Điện ảnh Việt Nam thời kỳ đổi mới"), opening 11:00, Sunday, November 25
- The HANIFF Campus for Young Talents, opening 9:00, Monday, November 26. This is an activity held for the first time in Vietnam within the framework of the Film Festival, with activities included as follows:
  - HANIFF Studio (training about 10 directors on how to make films, dialogue, casting and acting in front of the camera)
  - HANIFF project market (create opportunities for young filmmakers and producers to present and introduce their projects in front of experienced co-producers and investors)
  - HANIFF Forum of Script Idea Exchange (training and practice, for young screenwriters to compose scripts, develop characters, dialogue, discuss scripts with top screenwriters world).
- Seminar Cinema of Vietnam in Renovation Period (Vietnamese: "Điện ảnh Việt Nam thời kỳ đổi mới"), 14:00-16:00, Monday, November 26
- Seminar Cinema developing trend in digital technology (Vietnamese: "Xu hướng phát triển điện ảnh trong thời kỳ công nghệ số"), 9:00 - 12:00, Wednesday, November 28

Themed night events

- "Asia – Korea" Night: 19:00, Monday, November 26, at Hanoi Daewoo Hotel, 360 Kim Mã Street, Ba Đình District
- Europe Night and HANIFF Campus: 19:00, Wednesday, November 28, at Lý Club – 61 Lý Thái Tổ Street, Hoàn Kiếm District

Sightseeing Activities:

- Visiting Hạ Long Bay, all day, November 27
- Sightseeing Vietnamese Ethnology Museum, No. 01 Nguyễn Văn Huyên Street, Cầu Giấy District, 14:00, Wednesday, November 28

Movie screenings in theaters and exchange program of artists with the audience:

- Showtimes: 9:00 - 23:00, November 24 to 29
- The organizers expected that all films attending Haniff 2012 will be screened at 8 cinemas, but until the last days, receiving enthusiastic response, there was one more theater cluster participating in the screening including:
  - National Cinema Center, 87 Láng Hạ Street, Ba Đình District
  - Megastar Cineplex, 6th floor, Hanoi Vincom Building, 191 Bà Triệu Street, Hai Bà Trưng District
  - Megastar Cineplex, 5th floor, Pico Mall Center, 229 Tây Sơn Street, Đống Đa District
  - August Cinema Theater, 45 Hàng Bài Street, Hoàn Kiếm District
  - Kim Đồng Cinema Theater, 19 Hàng Bài Street, Hoàn Kiếm District
  - Lotte Cinema, 5th-6th floor, Parkson Landmark 72, Keangnam Tower, Phạm Hùng Road, Từ Liêm District
  - Lotte Cinema, 4th floor, Melinh Plaza, Hà Đông District
  - Ngọc Khánh Theater, 365 Kim Mã Street, Ba Đình District
  - Đại Đồng Theater, Hoàng Hoa Thám Street, Hà Đông District
- According to the festival's organizers, 70% of the seats of all screenings are sold to audience. Vietnamese films, documentaries, short films and films sponsored by international funds will be screened for free, while all foreign feature films will be sold at the price equal to 50% of the ticket price applied to each movie theater.

== Juries and mentors ==
=== Juries ===
There are three jury panels established for this film festival:

Feature film:

- Jan Schütte (Germany) , director, Director of the Berlin Film School - Chairman
- Cliff Curtis (New Zealand) , actor, producer of Whenua Films
- Taraneh Alidoosti (Iran) , actress
- Garin Nugroho (Indonesia) , director
- Như Quỳnh (Vietnam) , actress, People's Artist

Short film:

- Nguyễn Vinh Sơn (Vietnam) , director - Chairman
- Martin Delisle (Canada) , cinematographer, screenwriter, preliminary member of the Montreal International Short Film Festival
- Chalida Uabumrungjit (Thailand) , writer, film researcher, Director of Thai Short Film and Video Festival

Network for Promotion of Asian Cinema (NETPAC):

- Ashley Ratna Vibhushana (Sri Lanka) , Managing Director of NETPAC - Chairman
- Phạm Nhuệ Giang (Vietnam) , director
- Martine Thérouanne (France) , the President of Vesoul International Film Festival of Asian Cinema

=== Mentors for the HANIFF Campus ===
The following people joined in teaching and mentoring for The HANIFF Campus:

- Michael Toshiyuki Uno (United States) , director
- Jack Epps Jr. (United States) , screenwriter, lecturer at University of Southern California
- Michael J. Werner (United States) , Co-Chairman of Fortissimo Films
- Frank S. Rittman (Singapore) , Asia-Pacific regional vice president for the Motion Picture Association (MPA)
- Sonja Heinen (Germany) , Managing Director of European Film Promotion (EFP)
- Maren Niemeyer (Germany) , journalist, author, documentary filmmaker
- Tessa Inkelaar (England) , Development Producer at Film London
- Kang Je-gyu (South Korea) , director
- Dean Wilson (United States) , film researcher, consultant and lecturer at the Vietnam Cinema Project sponsored by the Ford Foundation
- Boo Junfeng (Singapore) , director

== Official Selection—In Competition ==
=== Feature Film ===
These 14 films were selected to compete for the official awards in Feature Film category:

English title	Original title	Director(s)	Production country
Blood Letter	Thiên mệnh anh hùng	Victor Vu	(Vietnam)
Diva	DIVA華麗之後 / DIVA hua li zi jun	Heiward Mak	(Hong Kong)
Existence	Existence	Juliet Bergh	(New Zealand)
Hatred	بغض / Bozq	Reza Dormishian	(Iran)
Helpless	화차 / Hwa-cha	Byun Young-joo	(South Korea)
Nice To Meet You	適切な距離	Oe Takamasa	(Japan)
Night of Silence	Lal Gece	Reis Çelik	(Turkey)
Passion	Đam mê	Phi Tiến Sơn	(Vietnam)
Ranjana, I Ain't Coming Back	রঞ্জনা আমি আর আসবনা / Ranjana Ami Ar Ashbona	Anjan Dutt	(India)
Sea Shadow	ظل البحر	Nawaf Al-Janahi	(United Arab Emirates)
Shackled	Posas	Lawrence Fajardo	(Philippines)
Song of Silence	楊梅洲 / Yang mei zhou	Chen Zhuo	(China)
Talgat	Талғат	Zhanna Issabayeva	(Kazakhstan)
The Telegram	телеграмма	Iskandar Usmonov	(Tajikistan)

Highlighted title indicates Best Feature Film Award winner.

=== Short film ===
The following films were selected to compete for official awards in Short Film category:

Short:

- Green Slime / 녹색물질 (12′) (South Korea)
- Hanger / Yi jia (13′) (Malaysia)
- Monday, Wednesday, Friday / Hai, Tư, Sáu (17′) (Vietnam)
- Solo (10′) (Japan)
- Sony, My Elder Brother (10′) (New Zealand)
- Starting From A / Bermula Dari A (16′) (Indonesia)
- Swamp (14′) (Kyrgyzstan)
- Switch (10′) (Australia)
- The Reunion Dinner / 回家过年 (16′) (Singapore)
- The Three Sisters / 三朵花 (15′) (Singapore)
- To Truong Luong / Gửi Trương Lương (20′) (Vietnam)
- Untitled Manila (5′) (Philippines)
- Whakatiki (13′) (New Zealand)

Documentary:

- Behind the Life / Đằng sau sự sống (30′) (Vietnam)
- God, Church, Pills & Condoms (28′) (Netherlands) (Philippines)
- Northeast Wind Is Back / Gió chướng lại về (20′) (Vietnam)
- The Story of Then Village / Chuyện làng Then (30′) (Vietnam)
- Two Girls Against The Rain (11′) (Cambodia)

Animated:

- Peaceful Space / Khoảng trời... (10′) (Vietnam)
- Planet Z (10′) (Japan)
- Steps (2′) (Japan)
- The Piping of Heaven (11′) (China) (Japan)
- The Way Up (11′) (Thailand)
- Yellow Cow / Bò vàng (10′) (Vietnam)

Highlighted title indicates Best Short Film Award winner.

== Official Selection—Out of Competition ==
These films were selected for out-of-competition programs:

=== Opening ===
- Hot Sand / Cát nóng – Lê Hoàng (Vietnam)

=== Panorama: World Cinema ===
- A Separation / جدایی نادر از سیمین – Asghar Farhadi (Iran)
- Amour – Michael Haneke (France) (Austria)
- At the Horizon / ປາຍທາງ – Anysay Keola (Laos)
- Bunohan – Dain Iskandar Said (Malaysia)
- Fly Me to the Moon / Un plan parfait – Pascal Chaumeil (France)
- Footnote / הערת שוליים – Joseph Cedar (Israel)
- Gangoobai – Priya Krishnaswamy (India)
- Maddened By His Absence / J'enrage de son absence – Sandrine Bonnaire (France)
- Mindfulness and Murder / ศพไม่เงียบ – Tom Waller (Thailand)
- Something in the Air / Après mai – Olivier Assayas (France)
- The Chef / Comme un chef – Daniel Cohen (France)
- The Day I Was Not Born / Das Lied in mir – Florian Cossen (Germany)
- The Iron Lady – Phyllida Lloyd (United Kingdom) (France)
- The Orator / O Le Tulafale – Tusi Tamasese (New Zealand) (Samoa)
- The Orphan of Kazan / Сирота казанская – Vladimir Mashkov (Russia)
- We Need to Talk About Kevin – Lynne Ramsay (United Kingdom) (United States)
- Brother Number One – Annie Goldson, Peter Gilbert (New Zealand) (Documentary)
- The Land Beneath The Fog – Shalahuddin Siregar (Indonesia) (Documentary)

There are 10 short Japanese animated films combined into one screening session called "Japanese animation collection" with a total duration of 90 minutes. (Japan)

==== Representing the Feature Film Jury ====
Because this year's feature film jury are famous directors and actors from different cinematic backgrounds, the organizers chose 5 films to represent 5 judges. The film Ngọc Viễn Đông was first chosen for Contemporary Vietnamese Film Program but then moved to this program.

- Bye Bye America / Auf Wiedersehen Amerika – Jan Schütte directed (Germany)
- Soegija – Garin Nugroho directed (Indonesia)
- Modest Reception / پذیرایی ساده – Mani Haghighi (Iran) , starring Taraneh Alidoosti
- Whale Rider – Niki Caro (New Zealand) , starring Cliff Curtis
- Pearls of the Far East / Ngọc Viễn Đông – Cường Ngô (Vietnam) , starring Như Quỳnh

=== Country-in-Focus: South Korea ===
The Korean Cinema Focus Program at HANIFF 2012 includes 10 films as follows:

- Late Autumn / 만추 – Kim Tae-yong (2010)
- Dancing Queen / 댄싱퀸 – Lee Seok-hoon (2012)
- Sector 7 / 7광구 – Kim Ji-hoon (2011)
- Silenced / 도가니 – Hwang Dong-hyuk (2011)
- Gingko Bed / 은행나무 침대 – Kang Je-gyu (1996)
- My Way / 마이 웨이 – Kang Je-gyu (2011)
- Howling / 하울링 – Yoo Ha (2012)
- Deranged / 연가시 – Park Jung-woo (2012)
- A Werewolf Boy / 늑대소년 – Jo Sung-hee (2012)
- Eungyo / 은교 – Jung Ji-woo (2012)

=== World Cinema Fund's Selection ===
The Berlin World Cinema Fund's Film Program introduces 5 outstanding films selected and supported in screening fee by the Fund:

- Bi, Don't Be Afraid / Bi, đừng sợ! – Phan Đăng Di (Vietnam)
- Death for Sale / موت للبيع – Faouzi Bensaïdi (Morocco)
- Silent Light – Carlos Reygadas (Mexico) (Poland) (Germany)
- The Prize / El premio – Paula Markovitch (Mexico)
- Uncle Boonmee Who Can Recall His Past Lives / ลุงบุญมีระลึกชาติ – Apichatpong Weerasethakul (Thailand)

=== Cinema of Vietnam ===
In order to provide an overview of Vietnamese cinema, at this film festival, the organizers selected 31 Vietnamese films, divided into 3 themes, for screening:

==== About Hanoi ====
- Chiếc chìa khóa vàng / The Golden Key – Lê Hoàng (2001)
- Em bé Hà Nội / Girl from Hanoi – Hải Ninh (1974)
- Hà Nội 12 ngày đêm / Hanoi: 12 Days and Nights – Bùi Đình Hạc (2002)
- Hà Nội mùa đông năm 46 / Hanoi Winter 1946 – Đặng Nhật Minh (1997)
- Khát vọng Thăng Long / The Prince and the Pagoda Boy – Lưu Trọng Ninh (2010)
- Ngọn đèn trong mơ / The Light in the Dream – Đỗ Minh Tuấn (1987)
- Truyện cổ tích cho tuổi mười bảy / Fairytale for 17-Year-Olds – Xuân Sơn (1988)

==== In Renovation Period ====
- Ai xuôi vạn lý / The Long Journey – Lê Hoàng (1996)
- Canh bạc / The Gamble – Lưu Trọng Ninh (1991)
- Chung cư / The Building – Việt Linh (1999)
- Cú và chim se sẻ / Owl and the Sparrow – Stephane Gauger (2007)
- Đời cát / Sandy Lives – Nguyễn Thanh Vân (1999)
- Gái nhảy / Bar Girls – Lê Hoàng (2002)
- Lưới trời / Heaven's Net – Phi Tiến Sơn (2003)
- Hãy tha thứ cho em / Please Forgive Me – Lưu Trọng Ninh (1993)
- Mùa ổi / The Guava House – Đặng Nhật Minh (2000)
- Những người thợ xẻ / The Sawyers – Vương Đức (1999)
- Thằng Bờm / Bờm the Fool – Lê Đức Tiến (1987)
- Thung lũng hoang vắng / The Deserted Valley – Phạm Nhuệ Giang (2001)
- Thị trấn yên tĩnh / The Quiet Town – Lê Đức Tiến (1986)
- Thương nhớ đồng quê / Nostalgia for Countryland – Đặng Nhật Minh (1995)
- Vị đắng tình yêu / The Bitterness of Love – Lê Xuân Hoàng (1990)
- Xương rồng đen / Black Cactus – Lê Dân (1993)

==== Contemporary (2010–2012) ====
- Chạm / Touch – Nguyễn Đức Minh (2011)
- Dành cho tháng Sáu / Of Us and June – Nguyễn Hữu Tuấn (2012)
- Đó... hay đây? / Here... or There? – Síu Phạm (2011)
- Lời nguyền huyết ngải / Blood Curse – Bùi Thạc Chuyên (2012)
- Mùi cỏ cháy / The Scent of Burning Grass – Hữu Mười (2012)
- Sài Gòn Yo! / Saigon Electric – Stephane Gauger (2011)
- Tâm hồn mẹ / Mother's Soul – Phạm Nhuệ Giang (2011)
- Scandal: Bí mật thảm đỏ / Scandal – Victor Vu (2012)

== Awards ==
All of official and independent awards of 2012 HANIFF were awarded at the closing ceremony of the festival, on the evening of November 29:

=== In Competition—Feature film ===
- Best Feature Film: Shackled (Philippines)
  - Special Jury Prize for Feature Film: Blood Letter (Vietnam)
- Best Director: Reis Çelik – Night of Silence (Turkey) , Iskandar Usmonov – The Telegram (Tajikistan)
- Best Leading Actor: Ilyas Salman – Night of Silence (Turkey)
- Best Leading Actress: Ying Yaning – Song of Silence (China)

=== In Competition—Short film ===
- Best Short Film: Starting From A – B.W. Purba Negara (Indonesia)
  - Special Jury Prize for Short Film: Yellow Cow – Trần Khánh Duyên (Vietnam)
- Best Young Director of a Short Film: Yonezawa Mina – Solo (Japan)

=== NETPAC Award ===
- NETPAC's Award for Asian Cinema Promotion: Shackled (Philippines)

=== The HANIFF Campus ===
- Best Young Talent Award of Motion Picture Association - Asia Pacific region: Nguyễn Hoàng Điệp (Vietnam)
- Talented Screenwriter Award of HANIFF Mentors: Đỗ Minh Tú (Vietnam)
- Talented Producer Award of HANIFF Mentors: Nguyễn Vũ Đức (Vietnam)
