= Sandcastle (disambiguation) =

A sandcastle is a model castle made of sand.

Sandcastle, sand castle, etc., may also refer to:

== Venues ==
- Sandcastle Waterpark (Blackpool), a water park in Blackpool, Lancashire, England
- Sandcastle Waterpark, a water park near Pittsburgh, Pennsylvania, USA
- The Sandcastle (stadium), now Surf Stadium, a baseball park in Atlantic City, New Jersey, USA

== Arts, entertainment, and media ==
=== Films ===
- Sand Castle (film), a 2017 film directed by Fernando Coimbra
- Sand Castles (film), a 2014 American independent drama film
- Sandcastle (film), a 2010 film directed by Boo Junfeng
- Sandcastles, a 1972 television movie directed by Ted Post
- The Sand Castle, a 1961 film starring Mabel Mercer
- The Sand Castle (1977 film), a stop motion short by Co Hoedeman
- The Sand Castle (2024 film), an Arabic fantasy thriller feature film

=== Literature ===
- Sandcastle (comics), a 2011 graphic novel by Pierre Oscar Levy and Frederik Peeters
- The Sandcastle (novel), a 1957 novel by Iris Murdoch
- The Sand Castle (novel), a 2008 novel by Rita Mae Brown

=== Music ===
- The Sandcastles, backing band of Shana Cleveland
- "Sand Castles" (song), a 1965 song by Elvis Presley included on the 2004 re-release album Paradise, Hawaiian Style
- "Sandcastles" (song), a 2016 song by Beyoncé from Lemonade
- "Sandcastles", a 1968 song by The 31st of February from The 31st of February
- "Sandcastles", a 1970 song by Aorta
- "Sandcastles", a 1972 song by Kincade
- "Sandcastles", a 1980 song by Journey from Dream, After Dream
- "Sandcastles", a 1995 song by Bomb the Bass from Clear
- "Sandcastles", a 1998 song by Eureka Farm from Analog
- "Sandcastle", a 2001 song by Regine Velasquez from Reigne
- "Sandcastles", a 2005 song mixed by Bonobo It Came from the Sea
- "Sandcastles", a 2005 song by Raised by Swans from Codes and Secret Longing
- "Sandcastles", a 2008 song by Donna Lewis from In the Pink
- "Sandcastles", a 2013 song by A Firm Handshake from Fix Me Up
- "Sandcastles", a 2013 song by The Regime from The Last Dragon
- "Sandcastles", a 2016 song by Jon English from History
- "Sandcastle", a 2022 song by Twice from Celebrate

=== Television ===
- "Sandcastles", a 1997 episode of Teletubbies
- The Sand Castle, a 1952 television series starring Kenneth Connor

== Science and technology ==
- Sandcastle (software), the Microsoft document generation program
- Operation Sandcastle, the British disposal of chemical weapons
