= The Wax Girl =

Canadian post-rock band

- Origin: Toronto, Ontario, Canada
- Genres: Post-rock, ambient
- Years active: 2012–present
- Label: WaxWerx
- Members: Alex Wright
- Website: landofthewaxgirl.com

The Wax Girl is a Canadian post-rock project founded by Toronto-based producer and composer Alex Wright, in 2012.

== History ==
=== Formation ===
In January 2012, Wright began writing and recording cinematic demos as a creative outlet. Wright explained in an interview in 2014 that he initially used the moniker "The Wax Girl" out of necessity for categorizing his demos, and that the name first entered his mind after rearranging the letters of his own name. As Wright continued to write and record music, he realized that he wanted to further pursue developing his body of work, and the name stuck around.

=== Anosmic EP (2013-2014) ===
After taking a year to study Audio Engineering and Production in college, Wright began working on new material in September 2013. By March 2014 an EP was completed.

On August 8, 2014, Wright self-released The Wax Girl's debut EP, Anosmic, with a limited run of fifty hand-numbered CDs. The EP was named after Wright's loss of sense of smell when he was 17. For the week ending September 9, 2014, Anosmic reached #1 on CJAM-FM's Top 30 chart.

=== Between Screens and Onwards (2014 -present) ===
On February 10, 2015, Wright self-released Between Screens, along with an animated video for the single, Nuclear Winter, which was premiered by Echoes and Dust (UK).

Between Screens also drew favourable attention from Weird Canada and Ride the Tempo.

On the background of the title, Wright has said "Without giving away too much, for me the title is a reflection of modern day relationships and how technology is disconnecting us."

On August 5, 2015, Wright released a charity single titled "Onwards", with all proceeds to benefit the Canadian Mental Health Association. Ride the Tempo premiered the video for Onwards, which was directed by London, Ontario-based filmmaker Edward Platero.

== Discography ==
=== Albums ===
Year	Album	Label
2015	Between Screens: Released: 10 February 2015; Format: Digital	Self-released

=== EPs ===
Year	EP	Label
2014	Anosmic EP: Released: 8 August 2014; Format: CD, Digital	Self-released

=== Singles ===
Year	Title
2015	Onwards: Released: 5 August 2015; Format: Digital

Both Anosmic EP and Between Screens were recorded by Wright at his studio, The Castle, located in Toronto, Ontario.

=== Music Videos ===
Year	Title	Credits
2015	Nuclear Winter	Directed and animated by Alex Wright
2015	Onwards	Directed by Edward Platero

== Soundtrack ==
=== Television ===
Three tracks from Anosmic EP; "Broken Space", "Unknown Location", and "Sleep Disorder" were used in RTÉ2's new reality TV series Exiles.

=== Podcasts ===
"Broken Space" was used in the Freakonomics radio episode "I Don't Know What You've Done With My Husband But He's a Changed Man."
