= The Little Things (Kelsea Ballerini song) =

Promotional single by Kelsea Ballerini

from the album Subject to Change
- Released: August 5, 2022
- Length: 2:57
- Label: Black River
- Songwriters: Kelsea Ballerini; Alysa Vanderheym; Ashley Gorley; Cary Barlowe
- Producers: Julian Bunetta; Shane McAnally

Kelsea Ballerini promotional singles chronology
"Love Is a Cowboy" (2022)	"The Little Things" (2022)	"What I Have" (2022)

Music video
- "The Little Things" on YouTube

"The Little Things" (stylized in all caps) is a song by American singer and songwriter Kelsea Ballerini. It was released through Black River Entertainment on August 5, 2022, as the second promotional single from Ballerini's fourth studio album, Subject to Change. She co-wrote the song with Alysa Vanderheym, Ashley Gorley, and Cary Barlowe, while Julian Bunetta and Shane McAnally produced it.

"The Little Things" is an uptempo track built around bright acoustic guitar, whose lyrics celebrate the small moments in a relationship through everyday expressions of affection. It was preceded by Subject to Change's lead single, "Heartfirst", and its first promotional single, "Love Is a Cowboy".

== Background and release ==
Ahead of its release, Ballerini teased "The Little Things" on Instagram by captioning a carousel of personal photographs with the phrase "It's the little things", subtly hinting at the song's title. She also shared a preview of the track on TikTok on August 2, 2022, where listeners compared its 1990s country-inspired sound to artists such as Trisha Yearwood and Shania Twain. Ballerini announced the track on her social media alongside its cover artwork on August 3.

Following the release of "Heartfirst" and "Love Is a Cowboy", Ballerini issued "The Little Things" on August 5, as the third song released in advance of her fourth studio album, Subject to Change, ahead of its September 23 release. It was released to digital and streaming through Black River Entertainment.

== Composition ==
Ballerini wrote "The Little Things" with Alysa Vanderheym, Ashley Gorley, and Cary Barlowe, while Julian Bunetta and Shane McAnally produced the track. Ballerini contributed lead and background vocals. Instrumentation was provided by Todd Lombardo (acoustic guitar), Craig Young (bass guitar), Evan Hutchings (drums and programming), Sol Philcox-Littlefield (electric guitar), Alex Wright (synthesizer), Bunetta and Vanderheym (programming). Drew Bollman served as tracking engineer, with additional engineering by Bunetta, assistance from Jeff Gunnell and Kam Luchterhand, digital editing by Bunetta and Gunnell, mixing by Joe Zook and Ross Newbauer, second engineering by Newbauer, mastering by Nathan Dantzler with assistance from Harrison Tate, and production coordination by Alyson McAnally.

"The Little Things" is an uptempo track built around bright acoustic guitar strums. Its lyrics celebrate the small moments in a relationship, with Ballerini expressing affection through everyday gestures and balancing emotional closeness with personal space. Rolling Stone's Jon Freeman described the track as a breezy song suited to "sunny, car windows-down listening experiences".

== Personnel ==
Credits were adapted from Tidal.

- Kelsea Ballerini – lead vocals, background vocals, songwriter
- Julian Bunetta – producer, programmer, additional engineering, digital editing
- Shane McAnally – producer
- Alysa Vanderheym – songwriter, programming
- Ashley Gorley – songwriter
- Cary Barlowe – songwriter
- Todd Lombardo – acoustic guitar
- Craig Young – bass guitar
- Evan Hutchings – drums, programming
- Sol Philcox-Littlefield – electric guitar
- Alex Wright – synthesizer
- Drew Bollman – tracking engineering
- Jeff Gunnell – assistant engineering, digital editing
- Kam Luchterhand – assistant engineering
- Joe Zook – mixing engineering
- Ross Newbauer – mixing, second engineering
- Nathan Dantzler – mastering
- Harrison Tate – mastering assistance
- Alyson McAnally – production coordination

== Release history ==
Release dates and formats
Region	Date	Format(s)	Label	Ref.
Various	August 5, 2022	Digital download; streaming	Black River	
