= So You Think You Can Dance (Vietnamese TV series) =

- Vietnamese: Thử thách cùng bước nhảy
- Presented by: Huỳnh Trấn Thành (2012-2016); Chí Thiện & Chibi Hoàng Yến (2016)
- Judges: Chí Anh - Tuyết Minh (2012-2015); John Huy Trần - Khánh Thi (2016)
- Country of origin: Vietnam
- Original language: Vietnamese
- No. of seasons: 5
- No. of episodes: 79 + 4 specials

Production
- Production location: Ho Chi Minh City
- Running time: 1–2 hours
- Production companies: Dong Tay Promotion; 19 Entertainment; Dick Clark Productions; Endemol Shine Group

Original release
- Network: HTVC Pure Vietnamese; HTVC Music (replay); HTV7 (HCMC); HTV1 (Hanoi); CVTV1 (Can Tho); DRT (Danang); YanTV; VCTV1; VCTV7
- Release: September 15, 2012 – January 21, 2017

Related
- Liên hoa tài năng và bước nhảy

Thử thách cùng bước nhảy: So You Think You Can Dance is a Vietnamese televised dance competition and an entry in the international So You Think You Can Dance television franchise. The show is produced by Dong Tay Promotion Company and Endemol Shine Group under licence from 19 Entertainment and Dick Clark Productions and begins broadcasting its first season on September 15, 2012. Chí Anh from the local Dancing with the Stars is set to be a permanent judge, with additional permanent judges yet to be announced. Guest judges include Ngô Thanh Vân, broadway staff John Huy Trần, choreographer Trần Ly Ly, B-boy Việt Max, and MC Thanh Bạch. The show's winner will receive 400 million đồng and a choice between several career advancement opportunities.

== Format ==
The show will feature twenty-three episodes, and a format similar to that of the original U.S. series in season 2-8. The first season will begin with three open audition episodes in which dancers (both professional and amateur, from any stylistic background and of ages from 16 to 30) can attempt to impress a panel of judges with their ability and earn a spot amongst the Top 100 competitors in the Ho Chi Minh City Semi-finals, which will represent one episode. The various rounds of the semi-finals will reduce these 100 contestant to a Top 20, who will then be paired into ten couples that will go on to perform in nine successive live shows, each of which will be followed by a results show, all culminating in a live finale.

=== Open auditions ===
The open auditions, the first stage in determining a seasons finalists, take place in major cities each season and are typically open to anyone aged 16–30 at the time of their audition. The cities where auditions are held change from season to season but some, such as Ho Chi Minh City and Hanoi, have featured in most seasons. During this stage, dancers perform a brief routine (typically a solo, but duet and group routines are allowed as well) before a panel of dance experts. This panel then decides on-the-spot whether the dancer demonstrated enough ability and performance value to proceed further. If the dancer exhibited exceptional ability in their performance, judges award a "ticket to Vegas," moving them instantly one step forward in the competition. Alternatively, if judges are on the fence about the dancer, they will ask the contestant to wait until the end of that day's auditions to participate in a short test of their ability to pick up professional choreography.

=== HCMC week callbacks ===
The second stage of the selection process – referred to as "the callbacks" or "HCMC Week", is a several-day-long process in which the remaining hopefuls are tested for overall well-rounded dance ability, stamina, and their ability to perform under pressure. The dancers are put through a battery of rounds that test their ability to pick up various dance styles (typically some of the more well-represented genres that are later prominent in the competition phase, such as hip-hop, jazz, ballroom and contemporary). Additionally they may be asked to perform further solos in styles of their choosing and, since season 2, participate in a group choreography round in which small teams of contestants must display their musicality and ability to communicate professionally by choreographing a performance to a randomly selected piece of music — this challenge is notable as being the only time competitors are asked to choreograph themselves, aside from solos. HCMC week is often portrayed as one of the most exhausting and stressful stages of the competition; each successive round sees cuts in which a significant portion of the remaining dancers are eliminated from competition and dancers are given a limited amount of time to adapt to styles they are sometimes wholly unfamiliar with while being physically taxed by the rapid progression of rounds and a limited amount of rest. At the end of this process, usually less than 40 competitors remain in a pool that final contestants are chosen from. Most seasons have featured 20 top finalists for the competition portion of the show.

=== Finalist selection and showcase episode ===
Following HCMC Week—which has, through video vignettes, made many of the dancers increasingly familiar to the audience as it observes their attempts to cope with the challenges of the week—the judge's panel selects their finalists from the remaining dancers, breaking the good or bad news to each dancer.

=== Top 20 to Top 10 ===
Following the finalist selection process, the show transitions into its regular competition phase, which lasts the rest of the season. The competition stage is divided into 5 weeks (two episodes each, consisting a performance episode and a results show revealing who goes/who stays as the outcome of the at-home-viewer voting), with two contestants eliminated per week. Dancers are paired-up — in some seasons at random, and in others by judges — into male-female couples that will stay paired for half of the remaining competition if neither is eliminated. These couples perform 1–2 duets per week in randomly selected styles. These duets, as with all non-solo performances at this stage in the competition, are choreographed by professional choreographers, who are often noteworthy names in their own genres. Prior to most duet performances, a video packet of clips of the couple preparing to perform the routine is shown; these packets are intended not only to demonstrate the couple's efforts to master the routine, but also to give glimpses of the personalities of the dancers as well as to allow the choreographer to give insight as to the thematic, narrative, and artistic intentions of the piece. Following each duet performance, the week's panel of judges gives critical feedback, often emphasizing the two key areas of technique and performance value. These duets and their accompanying video packets and critiques typically take up the majority of a competition show but may be supplemented by solos or group numbers during the later portion of the season. Each competition show ends with a quick recap of the night's routines accompanied by on-screen reminders of the telephone numbers by which at-home viewers can vote for the contestant(s) of their choosing and it is at this point that those lines open to receive votes.

Performance shows typically last two hours, commercials included. And results shows typically aired on the night immediately following that of the performance show of the same week and usually opened with a group routine from the remaining contestants. The main purpose of this show was to determine which of the dancers are eliminated that week, but these episodes generally also featured guest dance performances or guest musical acts, and sometimes video packets that provide insight on the dancers and their journey on the show. Regardless of how many shows air per week for a given season, a bottom three couples (those that garnered the fewest votes from viewers) are typically revealed weekly at this stage in the competition. Each of these six dancers are then in danger of elimination and must perform a solo for the judges as their last effort to impress and stay in the competition. The judges then retire briefly (typically during the night's headlining musical guest performance) to determine which man and woman (which are not necessarily from the same couple) will leave the competition. The eliminated dancers are then announced and given a brief send-off via a video montage. If the dancers who were eliminated were not from the same couple then the two remaining members form a new couple for the following week's performances. Results shows have one hour in length, commercials included.

=== Top 10 to Finale ===
Around the time that the show enters its 'Top Ten' competitor phase, there are typically several format changes that take place. Couples are split up and new pairings are formed for each of the remaining weeks (though some couples may be paired up more once). Additionally, voting is usually then cast for individual dancers rather than couples. Lastly, the judges often give up their power to save dancers until top 6 revealed, and eliminations are determined exclusively by viewer votes, with judges serving in only an advisory capacity. In the final performance show, the remaining dancers typically each dance duets with all of their remaining fellow finalists as well as perform solos and participate in group numbers. The following night's season finale episode is often the most elaborately produced show of a season and features the last performances of the competitors, encore performances of many of the season's most acclaimed routines, guest dancers (including returning past season competitors and cast-members from other international versions of the franchise), musical performances and multiple video packets chronicling the course of the season's events, all culminating in the announcement of the winner of the competition, as decided by the previous night's vote.

=== Overview of format and presentation by season ===
Season	Dates	Host	Permanent judges	Permanent Winner	Separate results show?	Dancer showcase episode?	Number of finalists in first live show	Number of contestants eliminated per week	Number of contestants remaining in finale	Number of winners	All-Stars included in format?	Point at which judge eliminations end	Voting for individual dancers starting with
1	2012 (Sept–Dec)	Huỳnh Trấn Thành	Nguyễn Hải Anh (Chí Anh); Nguyễn Thị Tuyết Minh	Lâm Vinh Hải	Yes	No	20	2	4	1	No	Top 6	Top 10
2	2013 (Aug–Dec)	Huỳnh Trấn Thành	Nguyễn Hải Anh (Chí Anh); Nguyễn Thị Tuyết Minh	Nguyễn Ngọc Thịnh	Yes	Yes	20	2	4	1	No	Top 6	Top 10
3	2014 (Sept–Jan)	Huỳnh Trấn Thành	Nguyễn Hải Anh (Chí Anh); Nguyễn Thị Tuyết Minh	Nguyễn Sơn Lâm	Yes	Yes	20	2	4	1	No	Top 6	Top 14
4	2015 (Sept-Jan)	Huỳnh Trấn Thành	Nguyễn Hải Anh (Chí Anh); Nguyễn Thị Tuyết Minh	Đỗ Hải Anh	Yes	Yes	20	2	4	1	Yes	Top 6	Top 12
5	2016 (Nov-Jan)	Huỳnh Trấn Thành	John Huy Trần; Khánh Thi	Nguyễn Đăng Quân	No	Yes	20	2	4	1	Yes		Top 20

== See also ==
- Dance on television
- Vietnam Best Dance Crew
