= 1st Hanoi International Film Festival =

- Opening film: Arthur 3: The War of the Two Worlds (France)
- Location: Hanoi, Vietnam
- Founded: 2010
- Awards: Best Feature Film: Sandcastle (Singapore)
- Hosted by: Anh Tuấn, Jennifer Phạm, Ngô Mỹ Uyên, Lại Văn Sâm
- Festival date: October 17–21, 2010
- Website: Website

Hanoi International Film Festival chronology
- 2nd Founded

The 1st Hanoi International Film Festival, originally known as 1st Vietnam International Film Festival, opened on October 17 and closed on October 21, 2010 at Vietnam National Convention Center, with the slogan "All together make dreams come true" (Vietnamese: "Tất cả cùng nhau biến ước mơ thành hiện thực").

From more than 90 films submitted, the Organizing Committee selected 67 films from 23 countries to attend with a full range of film genres such as: socio-psychological films, action comedies, animated films, historical films and documentaries.

This is one of the activities to celebrate the 1000 Years of Thăng Long - Hanoi. The festival aims to honor Asian cinema, promote cultural exchanges and foster further development cooperation between regional and international filmmakers through the showcase of the latest films by talented directors, especially the ones from Southeast Asian countries.

== Programs ==
The following programs were held within the framework of the 1st Vietnam International Film Festival:

Ceremonies:

- Ribbon-cutting ceremony to open the festival, Sunday morning, October 17, at Hanoi Opera House, Hoàn Kiếm District
- Opening ceremony: 20:00, Sunday, October 17 (live broadcast on VTV1), at Vietnam National Convention Center, Từ Liêm District
- Closing ceremony: 20:00, Thursday, October 21 (live broadcast on VTV2), at Vietnam National Convention Center, Từ Liêm District
  - Director Hồng Sến to be honored and In Memoriam

Professional activities at the Hanoi Opera House, Hoàn Kiếm District:

- Photo exhibitions at the front gate area:
  - Introducing the life and outstanding film achievements of People's Artist Hồng Sến (Vietnamese: "Giới thiệu cuộc đời cùng những thành tựu phim ảnh nổi bật của NSND Hồng Sến")
  - Contemporary Vietnamese Cinema (Vietnamese: "Điện ảnh Việt Nam đương đại")
  - Introducing photos of international film festivals taken and collected by Mr. Kim Dong-ho - Director of Busan International Film Festival (Vietnamese: "Giới thiệu ảnh về các LHP quốc tế được chụp và sưu tầm bởi ông Kim Dong-ho - Giám đốc LHP quốc tế Busan")
- Interactive activities in the Mirror Room:
  - Technology seminar: 3D movie making with cinematographer Barry Braverman (Vietnamese: "Làm phim 3D với nhà quay phim Barry Braverman"), organized by Panasonic Systems Asia Pacific, 10:30 - 12:30, Sunday, October 17
  - Technology seminar: Canon - The solution to minimize the budget for independent films (Vietnamese: "Canon - Giải pháp giảm tối đa kinh phí cho phim độc lập"), Monday morning, October 18
  - Forum: Solutions to enhance Vietnamese film production (Vietnamese: "Giải pháp tăng cường sản xuất phim Việt Nam"), Monday afternoon, October 18
  - Seminar: Vietnam - An attractive environment for film production (Vietnamese: "Việt Nam - Môi trường hấp dẫn sản xuất phim"), Tuesday afternoon, October 19
  - Seminar: Building Vietnam's film industry (Vietnamese: "Xây dựng nền công nghiệp điện ảnh Việt Nam"), Wednesday afternoon, October 20

Movie screenings in theaters:

- Showtimes: October 17 to 21
  - Sunday: all day from 10:00 to 21:00
  - Monday to Thursday: 16:00 to 21:00
- Tickets:
  - Movie tickets start selling in theaters from October 11, 2010; Opening and closing tickets sold from October 11, 2010 at Megastar Cineplex and National Cinema Center.
  - Ticket prices are reduced by 40% compared to weekdays at these 2 cinemas above. Particularly at Platinum Cineplex, ticket prices will be lower on the occasion of the opening of the cinema complex, only 10-20 kVND.
  - Viewers can book movie tickets 2 days in advance or before 11am of that day at movie locations.
  - Locations for information and ticket booking: At the information and ticket desks for guests at the Hanoi Opera House or in cinemas serving the festival.
- Theaters:
  - National Cinema Center: 3rd floor, 87 Láng Hạ Street, Ba Đình District
  - Megastar Cineplex: 6th floor, Hanoi Vincom Building, 191 Bà Triệu Street, Hai Bà Trưng District
  - Platinum Cineplex: 4th floor, The Garden Mễ Trì Building, Từ Liêm District

Outdoor movie screenings and audience exchange with the cast:

- Triple Tap by Derek Yee (Hong Kong) : 20:00 Monday, October 18, at August Revolution Square, Hoàn Kiếm District

== Juries and advisors ==
There are 3 jury panels established for this film festival along with an honorary advisory board.

=== Juries ===
Feature film:

- Phillip Noyce (Australia) , director - Chairman
- Marco Mueller (Italy) , director, producer, Director of Venice Film Festival
- François Catonné (France) , cinematographer
- Kang Soo-yeon (South Korea) , actress
- Đặng Nhật Minh (Vietnam) , director

Documentary and Short film:

- Juhani Alanen (Finland) , Executive Director for the Tampere Film Festival - Chairman
- Mathieu Poirot-Delpech (France) , cinematographer
- Bùi Đình Hạc, director, former Director of Vietnam Cinema Department

Network for Promotion of Asian Cinema (NETPAC):

- Aruna Vasudev (India) , film critic, writer, the Founder and President of NETPAC - Chairman
- Clodualdo del Mundo Jr. (Philippines) , screenwriter
- Ngô Phương Lan, film critic, Deputy Director of Vietnam Cinema Department

=== Honorable Advisory ===
- Kim Ji-seok (South Korea) , Busan International Film Festival programmer
- Christian Jeune (France) , Head of Cannes Film Festival’s Film Office
- Ellen M. Harrington (United States) , director, Museum Collections Curator at Academy Museum of Motion Pictures
- Régine Hatchondo, Executive Director of UniFrance
- Shaw Soo Wei, Executive Director of Hong Kong International Film Festival

== Official Selection - In Competition ==
=== Feature film ===
These 10 films were selected to compete for the official awards in Feature Film category:

English title	Original title	Director(s)	Production country
Big Boy	บิ๊กบอย	Monthon Arayangkoon	(Thailand)
Break Up Club	分手說愛你	Wong Chun-chun	(Hong Kong)
Dogwood Tree	ハナミズキ / Hanamizuki	Doi Nobuhiro	(Japan)
Foreigner	老外 / Lao Wai	Fabien Gaillard	(China)
Ice Kacang Puppy Love	初恋红豆冰	Ah Niu	(Malaysia)
Sandcastle	沙城	Boo Junfeng	(Singapore)
The Dreamer	Sang Pemimpi	Riri Riza	(Indonesia)
The Lieutenant	Trung úy	Hà Sơn	(Vietnam)
The Musician at the Dragon Citadel	Long thành cầm giả ca	Đào Bá Sơn	(Vietnam)
The Red Shoes	The Red Shoes	Raul Jorolan	(Philippines)

Highlighted title indicates Best Feature Film Award winner.

=== Documentary & Short film ===
These 12 documentary and short films were selected to compete for official awards in Documentary and Short Film category:

- Agrarian Utopia / Sawan baan na (Documentary, 122′) (Thailand)
- Always Beside You / Luôn ở bên con (Documentary, 70′) (Vietnam)
- Drupadi (45′) (Indonesia)
- Eatrip (Documentary, 75′) (Japan)
- Faces of the Future (Documentary) (Cambodia)
- Mental / Seishin (Documentary, 135′) (Japan)
- Others / Người khác (37′) (Vietnam)
- Temple Of Literature / Văn Miếu - Quốc Tử Giám (Documentary, 30′) (Vietnam)
- The Golden Grass Valley / Thung lũng cỏ vàng (Animated, 10′) (Vietnam)
- The Leaf / Chiếc lá (Animated, 13′) (Vietnam)
- The Lighter / Người thắp lửa (Documentary, 20′) (Vietnam)
- The Myth Of Bà Island / Sự tích đảo Bà (Animated, 28′) (Vietnam)

Highlighted title indicates Best Documentary & Short Film Award winner.

== Official Selection - Out of Competition ==
These films were selected for out-of-competition programs:

=== Opening ===
- Arthur 3: The War of the Two Worlds – Luc Besson (France) (3D Animated)

=== Vietnam Premiere Showcase ===
- The Floating Lives / Cánh đồng bất tận – Nguyễn Phan Quang Bình (Vietnam)

=== Panorama: World Cinema Today ===
- My Darling Is a Foreigner / ダーリンは外国人 – Kazuaki Ue (Japan)
- Summer Wars / サマーウォーズ – Hosoda Mamoru (Japan) (Animated)
- Lake Tahoe / ¿Te acuerdas de Lake Tahoe? – Fernando Eimbcke (Mexico)
- Venezzia – Haik Gazarian (Venezuela)
- Cheila – Eduardo Barberena (Venezuela)
- Ocean Heaven / 海洋天堂 – Xue Xiaolu (China) (Hong Kong)
- Optical Illusions / Ilusiones ópticas – Cristián Jiménez (Chile)
- The Day Goes and the Night Comes / Shabanerooz – Omid Bonakdar (Iran)
- Trick – Jan Hryniak (Poland)
- Dust – Max Jacoby (Luxembourg) (Austria)
- The Girl Who Leapt Through Time / 時をかける少女 – Hosoda Mamoru (Japan) (Animated)
- Confucius / 孔子 – Hu Mei (China)
- 32 Dec / 32. decembar – Saša Hajduković (Bosnia and Herzegovina) (Serbia)
- Road, Movie / रोड, मूवी – Walter Salles (India)
- Go Get Some Rosemary / Daddy Longlegs – Benny Safdie, Josh Safdie (United States)
- Under the Hawthorn Tree – Zhang Yimou (China)
- Sheika – Arnel Mardoquio (Philippines)
- Beyond the Circle / Britter Bairey – Golam Rabbany Biplob (Bangladesh)
- Medal of Honor / Medalia de onoare – Călin Peter Netzer (Romania)
- Triple Tap / 鎗王之王 – Derek Yee (Hong Kong)
- The Stool Pigeon / 线人 – Dante Lam (Hong Kong) (China)
- We Are from the Future 2 / Мы из будущего 2 – Aleksandr Samokhvalov, Dmitry Voronkov, Andres Puustusmaa, Boris Rostov, Oleg Pogodin (Russia)
- The Justice of Wolves / Правосудие волков – Vladimir Fatyanov (Russia)
- Cyrano Agency / 시라노; 연애조작단 – Kim Hyun-seok (South Korea)

=== Country-in-Focus: France ===
- Oceans / Océans – Jacques Perrin (Documentary, 2009)
- Heartbreaker / L'Arnacœur – Pascal Chaumeil (2010)
- Coco Chanel & Igor Stravinsky / Coco Chanel et Igor Stravinsky – Jan Kounen (2009)
- Babies / Bébé(s) – Thomas Balmès (Documentary, 2010)
- Little Nicholas / Le Petit Nicolas – Laurent Tirard (2009)

=== Vietnamese Cinema Today (2005 - 2010) (Vietnam) ===
- Chơi vơi / Adrift – Bùi Thạc Chuyên (2009)
- Huyền thoại bất tử / The Legend Is Alive – Lưu Huỳnh (2009)
- Sống trong sợ hãi / Living in Fear – Bùi Thạc Chuyên (2005)
- Dòng máu anh hùng / The Rebel – Charlie Nguyễn (2007)
- Hà Nội, Hà Nội – Bùi Tuấn Dũng, Li Wei (2005)
- Rừng đen – Vương Đức (2007)
- Chuyện của Pao / Story of Pao – Ngô Quang Hải (2005)
- Đừng đốt / Don't Burn – Đặng Nhật Minh (2009)
- Mùa len trâu / The Buffalo Boy – Nguyễn Võ Nghiêm Minh (2004)
- Áo lụa Hà Đông / The White Silk Dress – Lưu Huỳnh (2006)
- Trăng nơi đáy giếng / The Moon at the Bottom of the Well – Nguyễn Vinh Sơn (2008)
- Sinh mệnh / Being – Đào Duy Phúc (2006)
- Trái tim bé bỏng / The Little Heart – Nguyễn Thanh Vân (2008)
- Tribute: Cánh đồng hoang / The Abandened Field – Nguyễn Hồng Sến (1979)

== Awards ==
The official awards were awarded at the closing ceremony of the festival, on the evening of October 21. The independent awards such as NETPAC and Technicolor were awarded after in the closing press conference.

=== In Competition - Feature film ===
- Best Feature Film: Sandcastle (Singapore)
- Best Director: Boo Junfeng – Sandcastle (Singapore)
- Best Leading Actor: Ah Niu – Ice Kacang Puppy Love (Malaysia)
- Best Leading Actress: Fiona Sit – Break Up Club (Hong Kong) , Nhật Kim Anh – The Musician at the Dragon Citadel (Vietnam)

=== In Competition - Documentary & Short film ===
- Best Documentary Film: Always Beside You – Nguyễn Kim Hải (Vietnam)

=== NETPAC Award ===
- NETPAC's Award for Asian Cinema Promotion: Sandcastle (Singapore)

=== Special Award of Technicolor (Thailand) ===
- Post-production Support Award: The script of Rebellious Hot Boy and the Story of Cười, the Prostitute and the Duck – Vũ Ngọc Đãng, Lương Mạnh Hải (Vietnam)

=== Award of the Embassy of France in Vietnam and UniFrance ===
- Audience Choice Award for Most Favourite French Film: Little Nicholas (France)
