= Love Is a Cowboy =

Promotional single by Kelsea Ballerini

from the album Subject to Change
- Released: July 15, 2022
- Genre: Country
- Length: 2:44
- Label: Black River
- Songwriters: Jesse Frasure; Kelsea Ballerini; Parker Welling
- Producers: Jesse Frasure; Julian Bunetta; Shane McAnally

Kelsea Ballerini promotional singles chronology
"LA" (2020)	"Love Is a Cowboy" (2022)	"The Little Things" (2022)

Music video
- "Love Is a Cowboy" on YouTube

"Love Is a Cowboy" (stylized in all caps) is a song by American singer and songwriter Kelsea Ballerini. It was released through Black River Entertainment on July 15, 2022, as the first promotional single from Ballerini's fourth studio album, Subject to Change. She co-wrote the song with Jesse Frasure—who produced the track with Julian Bunetta and Shane McAnally—and Parker Welling.

A sentimental country ballad, "Love Is a Cowboy" uses the cowboy as a metaphor for the unpredictability of romantic love and features a traditional country-inspired arrangement built around acoustic instrumentation. It was accompanied by a music video depicting Ballerini performing in a wheat field at sunset.

== Composition ==
Ballerini wrote "Love Is a Cowboy" with Jesse Frasure and Parker Welling, while Frasure, Julian Bunetta, and Shane McAnally produced the track. Ballerini provided both lead and background vocals. Instrumentation was contributed by Sol Philcox-Littlefield and Todd Lombardo (acoustic guitar), Craig Young (bass guitar), Evan Hutchings (drums and programming), Frasure (electric guitar and programming), Jenny Fleenor (fiddle), and Alex Wright (piano). Drew Bollman served as tracking engineer, with additional engineering by Frasure and Bunetta, assistance from Jeff Gunnell and Kam Luchterhand, digital editing by Gunnell and Bunetta, mixing by Joe Zook and Ross Newbauer, second engineering by Newbauer, mastering assistance by Harrison Tate, and production coordination by Alyson McAnally.

"Love Is a Cowboy" is a country-tuned sentimental ballad that uses the cowboy as a metaphor for the unpredictability of romantic love, exploring the idea of embracing love despite the loss of control that accompanies it. The track is built around acoustic guitar, piano, steel guitar, and fiddle. Jeremy Chua of Taste of Country believed that a restrained arrangement built around those instrumentals, such as steel guitar and fiddle, emphasized "the overall organic sound".

== Release and promotion ==
Following the announcement of her fourth studio album, Subject to Change, Ballerini revealed "Love Is a Cowboy" as its second preview through her social media on July 14, 2022. The song was released the following day to digital and streaming through Black River Entertainment, ahead of the album's release on September 23, after Ballerini had spent several weeks teasing the project online. The accompanying music video unveiled on the same day features Ballerini performing in a wheat field at sunset as she sings about the emotional highs and lows of love.

== Personnel ==
Credits were adapted from Tidal.

- Kelsea Ballerini – lead vocals, background vocals, songwriter
- Jesse Frasure – producer, electric guitar, programmer, additional engineer, songwriter
- Julian Bunetta – producer, additional engineer, digital editing engineer
- Shane McAnally – producer
- Parker Welling – songwriter
- Sol Philcox-Littlefield – acoustic guitar
- Todd Lombardo – acoustic guitar
- Craig Young – bass guitar
- Evan Hutchings – drum kit, programmer
- Jenny Fleenor – fiddle
- Alex Wright – piano
- Joe Zook – mixing engineer
- Ross Newbauer – mixing, second engineer
- Drew Bollman – tracking engineer
- Jeff Gunnell – assistant engineer, digital editing engineer
- Kam Luchterhand – assistant engineer
- Harrison Tate – mastering second engineer
- Alyson McAnally – production coordinator

== Release history ==
Release dates and formats
Region	Date	Format(s)	Label	Ref.
Various	July 15, 2022	Digital download; streaming	Black River	
