= Alex Wright (musician) =

Canadian musician (born 1980)

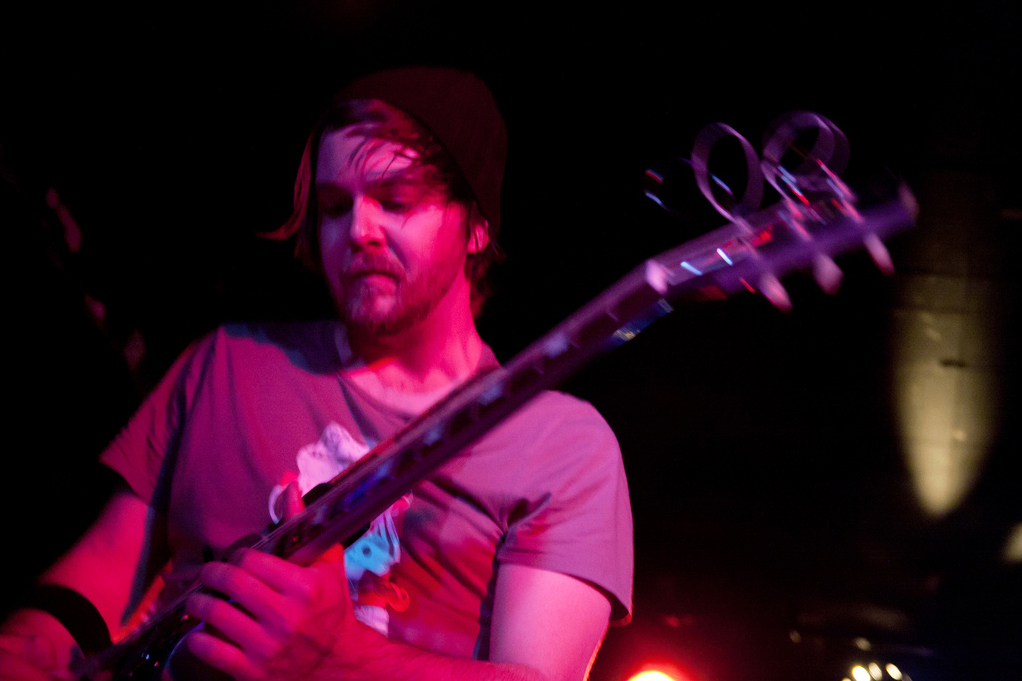
- Alex Wright in 2010

Background information
- Born: 28 August 1980 (age 46); Toronto, Ontario, Canada
- Genres: Post-rock, Ambient, Shoegaze
- Occupations: Musician, composer, producer
- Instruments: Guitar, keyboards, bass guitar
- Years active: 2007–present
- Formerly of: The Wax Girl, Raised by Swans
- Website: www.dialedto11.com

Alex Wright (born 28 August 1980) is a Canadian musician, composer, and the creator of DIALED211, a well-regarded guitar tutorial channel with a strong following. He has released solo work under various monikers since 2014 and was a touring member for Raised by Swans. Wright is credited for performing guitar parts on seven songs from the critically acclaimed album, No Ghostless Place. In 2010, Wright appeared as himself in Atom Egoyan's film Chloe, for Raised by Swans' live performance at The Rivoli in Toronto, Ontario, Canada.

== Career ==
=== Raised by Swans (2007 - 2012) ===
In 2007, Wright joined Raised by Swans as a live guitarist. During the recording of Raised By Swans' second album, No Ghostless Place, between 2007 and 2009, Wright performed additional guitar parts on seven of its thirteen songs, but did not contribute creatively to the parts he performed, nor to the composition or arrangements of the songs themselves.

In 2010, Raised By Swans appeared with Wright as the live version of itself in Atom Egoyan's film Chloe, in a scene with Amanda Seyfried and Julianne Moore at The Rivoli in Toronto, Ontario, Canada. Later in 2010, Wright travelled with Raised by Swans on a cross-Canada tour, and performed twenty-three shows in support of the release of 'No Ghostless Place'.

In addition to the cross-Canada tour, Wright performed with Raised by Swans at numerous shows and festivals between 2007 and 2012 including LOLA fest (2007), CMW (2011), Jack Richardson Awards (2011) two album release parties and a special show that was hosted by CHRW-FM where Raised by Swans was presented with an award for winning 'Best Local Album of the Year' in 2011, for No Ghostless Place.

Wright's last documented performance with Raised by Swans was on 18 August 2012 at Aeolian Hall, in London, Ontario.

=== The Wax Girl (2012 - present) ===
Wright began writing and recording songs in January 2012 as a creative outlet. During this time, the moniker "The Wax Girl" entered his mind by rearranging the letters of his own name. On the conception of "The Wax Girl", Wright said: "It really just started out with demos that I was making on my own. I was writing shoegaze, ambient, post-rock type demos for my own personal enjoyment and as a creative outlet. The more music I was creating, I started realizing that it was something that I wanted to pursue. I came up with the name The Wax Girl just as a name for these songs that I was writing. It was a way of categorizing these songs on my computer. That's how it got started. The name itself (The Wax Girl), is an anagram for my name."

After taking a year to study Audio Engineering and Music Production in college between September 2012 and August 2013, Wright started recording new material in September 2013 and a record began to take shape.

In August 2014, he released a debut 5-song EP, entitled Anosmic. With regards to the title, Wright said "I lost my sense of smell when I was 17. I decided to go with that name because it's something personal to me." Anosmic appeared on several Canadian campus charts, and reached as high as #1 on the CJAM 99.1 MHz chart for the week ending September 9, 2014. Echoes and Dust declared "this magnificent Canadian band has crafted something extraordinary" while Ride the Tempo said "Anosmic is a 5-track EP of gorgeous post-rock ambiance."

In February 2015, Wright released a full length follow-up entitled Between Screens. Ride the Tempo compared Between Screens to Anosmic, calling it "an even stronger set of music, and also more purposeful" while Weird Canada proclaimed that Between Screens is "perfect for laying back and letting the current take you where it will." Echoes and Dust premiered an animated video by Wright, for the single Nuclear Winter calling it a "glorious piece of work" while giving praise to Between Screens by saying "everything about this album makes the hair on my arms rise and creates goosebumps all over."

== Credits ==
Discography
Year	Album	Artist Name	Credit
2015	Between Screens	The Wax Girl	Written, recorded and produced by Wright
2015	B-side Screens	The Wax Girl	Written, recorded and produced by Wright
2014	Anosmic EP	The Wax Girl	Written, recorded and produced by Wright
2010	No Ghostless Place	Raised by Swans	Additional electric guitar performed by Wright

Filmography
Year	Title	Credit
2015	Nuclear Winter	Animated and directed by Wright
2010	Chloe	Wright appeared as himself, with Raised by Swans
