= Between Screens =

Studio album by The Wax Girl
- Released: 10 February 2015
- Recorded: April 2014 – January 2015 at The Castle in Toronto, Ontario, Canada
- Genre: Post-rock; Ambient music
- Length: 37:57
- Label: WaxWerx
- Producer: Alex Wright

The Wax Girl chronology
Anosmic EP (2014)	Between Screens (2015)

Professional ratings
Review scores
Source	Rating
Ride the Tempo	3.5/5 stars

Between Screens is the debut studio album by Canadian post-rock project The Wax Girl. It was self-released on February 10, 2015.

It was written and recorded in its entirety by Alex Wright at his studio in Toronto between April 2014 and January 2015. Wright has stated that the title "is a reflection of modern day relationships and how technology is disconnecting us".

== Track listing ==
All tracks are written by Alex Wright.

No.	Title	Length
1.	"Rift"	2:39
2.	"Conflict"	3:55
3.	"Plume"	3:09
4.	"Fallout"	4:09
5.	"Fog"	2:26
6.	"Nuclear Winter"	4:48
7.	"Constellations"	3:12
8.	"Equinox"	3:49
9.	"Daylight"	3:39
10.	"Emergence"	6:11

== Artwork ==
=== Album cover ===
The cover art is a photograph taken by Sara Deso during the December 2013 North American storm complex.

=== Nuclear Winter video ===
With the release of Between Screens, Wright also released an animated video for the sixth track Nuclear Winter.

== Reception ==
Echoes and Dust praised Between Screens, saying "everything about this album makes the hair on my arms rise and creates goosebumps all over."

Ride the Tempo declared that "'Between Screens’ is an even stronger set of music, and also more purposeful" compared to The Wax Girl's "excellent" 2014 release, Anosmic EP.

Weird Canada published a feature on April 2, 2015, proclaiming that Between Screens is "perfect for laying back and letting the current take you where it will."

The animated video for Nuclear Winter was critically lauded by both Backseat Mafia and Echoes and Dust. The video was ranked #9 on Ride the Tempo's list of Top Canadian Music Videos of 2015.
