= Anosmic (EP) =

EP by The Wax Girl
- Released: 8 August 2014
- Recorded: September 2013 – March 2014 at The Castle in Toronto, Ontario, Canada
- Genre: Post-rock; Ambient music
- Length: 18:40
- Label: WaxWerx
- Producer: Alex Wright

The Wax Girl chronology
Anosmic (2014)	Between Screens (2015)

Anosmic is the debut extended play (EP) by Canadian post-rock project The Wax Girl. It was written and recorded in its entirety by Alex Wright at his studio in Toronto, The Castle, and was self-released on August 8, 2014.

== Track listing ==
All tracks are written by Alex Wright

No.	Title	Length
1.	"Consciousness"	2:15
2.	"Broken Space"	3:08
3.	"Unknown Location"	2:49
4.	"Departure"	3:37
5.	"Sleep Disorder"	6:51

== Artwork ==
The cover art, titled Fossil 1 was created by Canadian artist, and Alex Wright's brother, Max Wright.

The back cover features a manipulated photograph by amateur photographer Harvey Naylor, taken in 1980, of a pre-gentrified area of Toronto.

The inner sleeve features a wintry photograph by Sara Deso.

== Reception ==
Ride the Tempo called it "a 5-track EP of gorgeous post-rock ambiance" while Echoes and Dust said "this magnificent Canadian band has crafted something extraordinary."

Geyser Music raved "Remaining true to expectations of post-rock while discovering a unique tone and personality can be challenging for any musical group. The Wax Girl has accomplished just that with Anosmic. Ephemeral and grounded, other worldly and meticulously designed, Anosmic is a treat for all post-rock aficionados."

Way Too Indie praised Anosmic and said "With a strong debut like this, I cannot wait for more. Alex’s composition for these tracks make it easy to interpret multiple stories from the album, depending on the listener, and its tales are unforgettable."

Anosmic reached #1 on CJAM-FM's Top 30 chart for the week ending September 9, 2014.
