= Apprentice (film) =

2016 film by Boo Junfeng

- Film poster
- Directed by: Boo Junfeng
- Written by: Boo Junfeng
- Produced by: Raymond Phathanavirangoon; Fran Borgia; Tan Fong Cheng
- Starring: Firdaus Rahman; Wan Hanafi Su
- Cinematography: Benoit Soler
- Edited by: Natalie Soh; Lee Chatametikool
- Music by: Alexander Zekke; Matthew James Kelly
- Distributed by: Clover Films / Golden Village Pictures (Singapore); Version Originale (France)
- Release dates: 16 May 2016 (Cannes); 1 June 2016 (France); 30 June 2016 (Singapore)
- Running time: 96 minutes
- Countries: Singapore; Germany; France; Hong Kong; Qatar
- Languages: Malay; English
- Budget: SG$1.8 Million
- Box office: US$52,991 (France); SG$174,000 (Singapore)

Apprentice is a 2016 drama film directed by Boo Junfeng. It was screened in the Un Certain Regard section at the 2016 Cannes Film Festival. It was selected as the Singaporean entry for the Best Foreign Language Film at the 89th Academy Awards but it was not nominated.

The film focuses on a young prison officer meeting an older colleague, who is revealed to be the chief executioner. As their relationship intensifies, their backstories are revealed throughout the course of the film. It also touches on the death penalty from an executioner's point of view.

== Plot ==
Prison officer Sergeant Aiman Yusof has just been transferred from "Commonwealth" (referring to the former Queenstown Remand Prison) to the fictional Larangan Prison, the state's maximum security prison. Due to his vocational education background, he is assigned to watch the rehabilitating prisoners at the prison's workshop. Later on, while helping a colleague, Sergeant Joseph, to clear some stores at the prison gallows, he encounters the Chief Executioner, Senior Chief Warder (1) Rahim. He volunteers to help Rahim find suitable rope for the gallows, and the two men soon strike up a friendship.

At home, Aiman informs his older sister, Suhaila, of his encounter with the hangman. This puts a strain on the siblings' relationship; Suhaila is displeased with Aiman's dealings at work, particularly because their father Yusof Ibrahim was sentenced to death thirty years ago for murder, leading to them being raised by their grandfather Ibrahim Fazril, while Aiman appears to disapprove of Suhaila's relationship with John, an Australian expat.

At work, Joseph reveals to Aiman that he has stepped down as Rahim's assistant because, when tasked with carrying out an execution, he could not bring himself to pull the lever. Aiman agrees to become Rahim's new apprentice. Suhaila calls Aiman to announce her engagement to John. Aiman does not take it well, and out of spite, tells Suhaila that he is now the hangman's assistant, greatly angering Suhaila. Meanwhile, Rahim teaches Aiman the tricks of the trade and shares his knowledge and experience with him, and their mentor-mentee bond grows stronger.

Aiman finally receives first-hand experience with an execution. He ushers death-row inmate Randy to the gallows, where Rahim offers Randy words of consolation before performing the execution. Distraught with the experience, Aiman tries to call Suhaila to no avail. He rushes home to find the house empty; Suhaila has presumably left for Australia with John.

In the meantime, Rahim checks on Aiman's security clearance and finds out that Aiman's father had been sentenced to death in 1985; he recognises him as one of the people he had executed long time ago. When Aiman returns to work, Rahim tells him that his father's criminal record ought to have precluded him from taking up a role pertaining to execution, and that his failure to disclose such was a disciplinary offence. Aiman argues that his father's past should not have any bearing on his employment and others' impressions of him. The two men get into a heated argument; Aiman questions Rahim's ethics for executing criminals despite loathing murder and claiming to exercise compassion when granting the prisoners a quick death, while Rahim chides Aiman for speaking out of line, as well as expressing both his disgust and condemnation towards Aiman's father for cruelly murdering and dismembering his friend in cold blood. When things finally cool down, Rahim says Aiman can expect disciplinary actions. When Aiman returns home, he sends a voice message to Suhaila to let her know that he could lose his job.

Rahim is involved in a road traffic accident and is hospitalized, but he is in critical condition. Assistant Superintendent James Tan puts Aiman in charge of an upcoming execution, implying that not only might Aiman not have been charged, his career with the prisons department may have taken a turn for the better. The next morning, Suhaila calls Aiman about her arrival in Australia. She checks with Aiman to confirm if he will be charged; Aiman responds "maybe not". She then reassures him and lets him know that, as his older sister, she will always be there for him.

The day of the execution arrives. The death-row inmate is ushered towards Aiman, with a number of important persons observing. Aiman leads the inmate to the gallows, puts the noose around the inmate's neck and places his hands on the lever that activates the trap doors. The screen goes black.

== Cast ==
- Firdaus Rahman as Sergeant Aiman Yusof, a 28-year-old Malay prisons officer who is recently transferred to Larangan Prison.
- Wan Hanafi Su as Senior Chief Warder (1) Rahim, the prison's long-serving Chief Executioner.
- Mastura Ahmad as Suhaila, Aiman's older sister.
- Nickson Cheng as Sergeant Joseph Lee, Rahim's assistant who later steps down.
- Boon Pin Koh as Assistant Superintendent James Tan, Larangan Prison's Chief Clerk who later assigns Aiman to perform his first execution.
- Crispian Chan as Randy Tan, a death-row inmate.
- Sean Tobin as John, an Australian expat and Suhaila's love interest.
- Gerald Chew as Hock, a death-row inmate.

== Production ==
Preparations for the film were spread over a period of five years. As a starting point for research, Boo had read the book Once a Jolly Hangman by Alan Shadrake. The book, critical of Singapore's judicial system, also included an interview with hangman Darshan Singh who had executed up to 18 convicts in a day. He had also interviewed former executioners, imams and priests who had helped death row inmates with their last prayers prior to their execution, and families of those gone under the death penalty.

Film shooting took place inside several disused prison facilities in New South Wales, Australia. This was also done to further avoid uproar from fellow Singaporeans regarding the controversial practice being the topic of the film.

== Reception ==
Apprentice received positive reviews and a standing ovation at the film's premiere at the Cannes Film Festival.

Domestically, the film premiered at the Capitol Building on 14 June, followed by an island wide release on 30 June. Reviews for the film were positive. The film also had a significant following in neighbouring country Malaysia as it premiered in selected cinemas there on 24 November of the same year with positive reviews.

=== Accolades ===
The film has won several awards for its story narrative and cast, including the NETPAC award at the Golden Horse Film Festival and Awards, "Best Narrative Film" at the Interfaith Awards of St. Louis International Film Festival, the Golden Orchid Special Special Mention for "Best Acting Ensemble" at Hawaii International Film Festival, Asian New Wave Best Film at QCinema International Film Festival 2016 and director Boo Junfeng wins the "Rising Director" award Busan International Film Festival.

== See also ==
- Capital punishment in Singapore
- List of submissions to the 89th Academy Awards for Best Foreign Language Film
- List of Singaporean submissions for the Academy Award for Best Foreign Language Film
