= Subject to Change (Kelsea Ballerini album) =

Studio album by Kelsea Ballerini
- Released: September 23, 2022
- Length: 46:39
- Label: Black River
- Producers: Kelsea Ballerini; Julian Bunetta; Jesse Frasure; Shane McAnally; Alysa Vanderheym

Kelsea Ballerini chronology
Ballerini (2020)	Subject to Change (2022)	Rolling Up the Welcome Mat (2023)

Singles from Subject to Change
- 1. "Heartfirst" Released: April 8, 2022; 2. "If You Go Down (I'm Goin' Down Too)" Released: December 5, 2022

Subject to Change (stylized in all caps) is the fourth studio album by American singer Kelsea Ballerini. The album was released on September 23, 2022, through Black River Entertainment. Ballerini co-produced the album along with Shane McAnally, Julian Bunetta, Jesse Frasure, and Alysa Vanderheym. "Heartfirst" was released as its first single on April 8, 2022.

== Background ==
Ballerini first announced the album in July 2022. Ballerini had hinted that there was a collaboration on the album, and on September 8, 2022, confirmed that the song, "You're Drunk, Go Home" featured Kelly Clarkson and Carly Pearce. Ballerini co-wrote on fourteen tracks, and sole wrote one.

The albums track listing is "90s-inspired", and shows her growth as an artist. Some songs on the album are described as "breezy pop" and "super fun, honky tonk-style". Talking about the composition of the album, Ballerini explained to Billboard that she "intentionally wanted to write with more women this time. For me, when you are making a record about emotions, when you connect with a woman creatively, you’re gonna be able to tap into that in a whole different way". She noted that the writing process for her 2021 poetry book Feel Your Way Through influenced her songwriting for Subject to Change, stating that "I credit a lot of the openness and the more poetic side of the songwriting to the book. I feel like that opened my mind creatively and helped me work outside of the [standard song] structure. That creative freedom unlocked a part of me I hope to keep pushing in any kind of project that I do". She also described The Corrs, Shania Twain, Trisha Yearwood, Sixpence None the Richer and Sheryl Crow as key influences for the album.

== Promotion ==
On September 23, 2022, Ballerini appeared on Good Morning America and performed the lead single, "Heartfirst". On September 27, Ballerini performed "Love Is a Cowboy" on The Late Late Show with James Corden, and "What I Have" on The Kelly Clarkson Show on September 30. She promoted the album on the ten date Heartfirst Tour, which began on September 24, in New York City.

"Heartfirst", released on April 8, 2022, debuted at number 24 on the US Country Airplay chart, and ultimately reached a peak of number 23. "Love Is a Cowboy" was released as the first promotional single on July 15. "The Little Things" and "What I Have" were also issued ahead of the album release as the promotional singles. "If You Go Down (I'm Goin' Down Too)" was released on December 5, as the album's second single.

== Critical reception ==
Professional ratings
Review scores
Source	Rating
365 Days of Inspiring Media	5/5
AllMusic	4/5 stars
PopMatters	6/10

Steven Thomas Erlewine of AllMusic gave the album four out of five stars. He says, "Subject to Change is simultaneously glossy and softly lit, an album with plenty of modern electric flair. " Compared to her previous album, Jeffrey Davies of PopMatters wrote that the album's material has "moved backward as bland" and described Subject to Change as Ballerini's most conservative work to date. However, he praised her vocals as the strongest they've ever been and observed that she is "in her element musically." Rolling Stone's Dan Hyman said that the album is "mature and refreshing" and that it features some of her "most sonically progressive material to date."

== Track listing ==
All tracks produced by Kelsea Ballerini, Shane McAnally, and Julian Bunetta, with the exception of "Love Is a Cowboy", produced alongside Jesse Frasure, and "Doin' My Best", produced alongside Alysa Vanderheym. Mixed by Joe Zook.

Subject to Change track listing
No.	Title	Writer(s)	Length
1.	"Subject to Change"	Kelsea Ballerini; Karen Fairchild; Alysa Vanderheym	2:59
2.	"The Little Things"	Ballerini; Vanderheym; Ashley Gorley; Cary Barlowe	2:57
3.	"I Can't Help Myself"	Ballerini; McAnally; Bunetta; Josh Osborne	3:21
4.	"If You Go Down (I'm Goin' Down Too)"	Ballerini; McAnally; Bunetta	2:46
5.	"Love Is a Cowboy"	Ballerini; Jesse Frasure; Parker Welling	2:43
6.	"Muscle Memory"	Ballerini; McAnally; Bunetta	3:31
7.	"I Guess They Call It Fallin'"	Ballerini; McAnally; Bunetta; Vanderheym; Miranda Glory; Jordan Shellheart	4:01
8.	"Weather"	Ballerini; Vanderheym	2:54
9.	"Universe"	Ballerini; Vanderheym; Sasha Alex Sloan	2:56
10.	"Walk in the Park"	Ballerini; McAnally; Jimmy Robbins	3:20
11.	"Heartfirst"	Ballerini; Fairchild; Vanderheym	3:07
12.	"You're Drunk, Go Home" (with Kelly Clarkson and Carly Pearce)	Ballerini; McAnally; Bunetta	2:55
13.	"Doin' My Best"	Ballerini; Vanderheym	2:37
14.	"Marilyn"	Ballerini	3:26
15.	"What I Have"	Ballerini; Vanderheym; Cary Barlowe	2:58
Total length:			46:39

== Personnel ==
Vocals

- Kelsea Ballerini – lead vocals, background vocals
- Cary Barlowe – background vocals
- Julian Bunetta – background vocals
- Kelly Clarkson – background vocals, featured vocals, lead vocals
- Shane McAnally – background vocals
- Carly Pearce – background vocals, featured vocals, lead vocals
- Josh Reedy – background vocals
- Alysa Vanderheym – background vocals

Musicians

- Kelsea Ballerini – clapping
- Cary Barlowe – acoustic guitar
- Julian Bunetta – clapping, bass guitar, electric guitar, mandolin, percussion, synthesizer
- Kris Donegan – acoustic guitar, electric guitar
- Jenee Fleenor – fiddle
- Evan Hutchins – drums, percussion
- Sol Littlefield – acoustic guitar, clapping, electric guitar
- Todd Lombardo – acoustic guitar, banjo, dobro, mandolin
- Shane McAnally – clapping
- Justin Schipper – clapping, dobro, steel guitar
- Ilya Toshinskiy – acoustic guitar, clapping, ukulele
- Derek Wells – electric guitar
- Alex Wright – piano, synthesizer
- Whit Wright – steel guitar
- Craig Young – bass guitar, clapping

Production

- Kelsea Ballerini – producer
- Drew Bollman – engineer
- Julian Bunetta – digital editing, producer, programming
- Nathan Dantzler – mastering
- Jesse Frasure – assistant engineer, producer
- Ryan Gore – assistant engineer
- Jeff Gunnell – assistant engineer, digital editing
- Evan Hutchins – programming
- Kam Lutcherhand – assistant engineer
- Alyson McAnally – production coordination
- Shane McAnally – producer
- Joel McKenney – assistant engineer
- Alysa Vanderheym – assistant engineer, digital editing, producer, programming
- Ross Vewbauer – assistant engineer
- Matt Wolach – assistant engineer
- Joe Zook – mixing

Imagery

- Molly Dickson – styling
- Ashley Kohorst – art direction, design
- Daniel Prakopcyk – photography
- Patrick Tracy – art direction, design

== Charts ==
Chart performance for Subject to Change
Chart (2022)	Peak position
Australian Albums (ARIA)	82
Australian Country Albums (ARIA)	7
Canadian Albums (Billboard)	72
Scottish Albums (Official Charts)	68
UK Country Albums (Official Charts)	1
UK Album Downloads (Official Charts)	11
UK Independent Albums (Official Charts)	27
US Billboard 200	18
US Independent Albums (Billboard)	4
US Top Country Albums (Billboard)	3
