= What I Have =

2022 promotional single by Kelsea Ballerini

Promotional single by Kelsea Ballerini

from the album Subject to Change
- Released: September 2, 2022
- Length: 2:59
- Label: Black River
- Songwriters: Alysa Vanderheym; Cary Barlowe; Kelsea Ballerini
- Producer: Alysa Vanderheym

Kelsea Ballerini promotional singles chronology
"The Little Things" (2022)	"What I Have" (2022)	"Sorry Mom" (2024)

Music video
- "What I Have" on YouTube

"What I Have" (stylized in all caps) is a song by American singer and songwriter Kelsea Ballerini. It was released through Black River Entertainment on September 2, 2022, as the third promotional single from Ballerini's fourth studio album, Subject to Change. She co-wrote the song with Alysa Vanderheym and Cary Barlowe; the former produced the track.

A stripped-back acoustic track, "What I Have"'s diary-like lyrics reflect on gratitude, comparison, and finding contentment with what one has. Ballerini first performed the song at the Grand Ole Opry in early 2022 before its release, and later altered one of its lyrics during live performances following her divorce from Morgan Evans.

== Background and release ==
Ballerini first performed "What I Have" at the Grand Ole Opry on January 22, 2022, while revealing that she was in the early stages of recording her fourth studio album, Subject to Change. Introducing the song, she explained that the COVID-19 pandemic had led her to appreciate "the little things" in life and inspired a recurring theme of gratitude throughout the project. Calling it "a song that [she is] really proud of", Ballerini joked that it might appear on the album if the audience liked it. When announcing the song on Instagram, Ballerini described it as having been "written somewhere in between reflection and eagerness", concluding that, "although ever changing", she was "happy with what [she had]".

== Composition ==
Ballerini wrote "What I Have" with Alysa Vanderheym and Cary Barlowe, while Vanderheym produced the track. Ballerini contributed lead and background vocals, with additional background vocals provided by Barlowe. Barlowe also played acoustic guitar. Vanderheym handled programming, recording engineering, digital editing, and mixing engineering. The song was mastered by Nathan Dantzler and assisted by Harrison Tate, while Alyson McAnally served as production coordinator.

A stripped-back track built around gently strummed acoustic guitar, "What I Have" features diary-like lyrics that reflect on comparison and contentment. Taste of Country's Jeremy Chua wrote that the song captures the genre's "three chords and the truth" ethos, while its understated arrangement allows Ballerini's "heart-on-sleeve" delivery to remain the focal point.

== Live performances ==
During a concert in New York City following the release of Subject to Change, Ballerini altered the lyrics of "What I Have" to reflect her recent divorce from Morgan Evans, changing the line "I got a warm body in bed" to "I got my own body in bed".

== Personnel ==
Credits were adapted from Tidal.

- Kelsea Ballerini – lead vocals, background vocals, songwriter
- Alysa Vanderheym – producer, songwriter, programming, recording engineering, digital editing, mixing engineering
- Cary Barlowe – songwriter, acoustic guitar, background vocals
- Nathan Dantzler – mastering
- Harrison Tate – mastering assistance
- Alyson McAnally – production coordination
