= Owl and the Sparrow =

- Screenshot
- Directed by: Stephane Gauger
- Written by: Stephane Gauger
- Produced by: Quan Van Nguyen; Nam Nhat Doan; Timothy Bui; Ham Tran
- Starring: Cat Ly; Le The Lu; Pham Gia Han
- Cinematography: Stephane Gauger
- Edited by: Ricardo Javier; Ham Tran
- Music by: Peter Nguyen
- Distributed by: Annam Pictures; Wave Releasing
- Release date: 1 February 2007 (International Film Festival Rotterdam)
- Country: Vietnam
- Language: Vietnamese

Owl and the Sparrow (Cú và chim se sẻ in Vietnamese) is a 2007 drama film by Stephane Gauger that follows the fictional story of three Vietnamese individuals (a runaway child, a zoo keeper and a flight attendant) over a period of five days as they meet in Saigon.

== Plot ==
The film takes place during five days in the lives of the main characters: Thuy (Pham Gia Han), a ten-year-old runaway orphan, Lan (Cat Ly), a flight attendant, and Hai (Le The Hu), a zookeeper. Thuy works in a factory for her uncle, Minh (Nguyen Hau), who thinks she is useless and unfit for school. Having a great desire for a life elsewhere, she runs away from home and ends up on the streets of Saigon selling postcards and roses to earn a living. One night, Thuy meets Lan at a noodle shop and the two become friends. On hearing that Thuy is homeless, Lan gives her a place to stay at her apartment and Thuy comes to admire her for her kindness, beauty, and independence. Unbeknownst to everyone, however, Lan is having an affair with a co-worker and is secretly unhappy with her life.

The next day, Thuy goes to the zoo and befriends an elephant whose keeper, Hai, takes her under his wing. His uncanny ability to understand the animals captivates Thuy, who begins helping at the zoo. While at the marketplace, Hai asks Thuy to deliver a bouquet to a woman named Phuong (Nguyen Kim Phuong) and tells her that he and Phuong were once engaged, but (it is implied) the relationship dissolved due to her family’s disapproval of his profession. Thuy warns that even if Phuong returns, she will only break his heart again. To ensure this doesn’t happen, she tells Hai that Phuong has a new boyfriend (although the latter informed her that she was single). Feeling dejected, Hai brings Thuy back to the zoo and tells her that he knows of an orphanage where she will be safe. Thinking that Hai wishes to see her locked away like an animal, she leaves and returns to the city.

At the same time, Lan breaks off her affair with her co-worker (who is already married). She comes home and finds Thuy asleep at her doorstep. They go out for dinner at a restaurant where Hai shows up and meets Lan for the first time. Despite an awkward beginning, the night turns into a family outing of sorts and ends with Lan and Hai realizing that they are both lost souls unsure of what they want in life. Having brought them together, Thuy leaves Lan in the apartment with a single rose as a thank you and a goodbye. Hours later, policemen canvas the streets checking for employment papers. While most of the children escape, the police catch Thuy, whom they send to an orphanage in the city.

Lan searches frantically for Thuy and goes to the zoo to seek Hai. They find the orphanage, but are unable to claim her as neither of them are relatives. To everyone’s dismay, Minh arrives with documents proving he is Thuy’s legal guardian and takes her back to the country to work in the factory. Unwilling to live a life of servitude, however, Thuy escapes and takes a large amount of Minh's money. She goes to Hai and offers to buy his favorite elephant (so it won’t be deported to a zoo in India). Moved, but disappointed, Hai returns the money to Minh. On witnessing first-hand the life that Thuy endures, Hai offers to pay for her to live and work at the zoo where he will be her guardian. Thuy is elated but saddened that Hai and Lan are not together (due to Hai’s insecurities about not being good enough for her). In a last ditch effort, Thuy visits Lan at her apartment, but finds her gone. She leaves a note and a package before going.

At the airport that evening, Lan opens the package and reads the note from Thuy in which she says that Lan is her family. The package also contains a pair of dolls (Thuy’s prized possessions). Deeply touched, Lan races out of the airport and through the streets of Saigon. On finding Thuy, she drops to her knees and embraces her while Hai smiles down on them both, overjoyed at seeing their “family” complete.

== Release ==
The movie premiered in January 2007 at the International Film Festival Rotterdam, before playing in over thirty film festivals worldwide.

The movie was released theatrically in Japan as The Happiest Place in the World, South Korea as The Lovely Rose, and Spain as Cinco dias en Saigon.

In the United States, it opened in limited release on January 16, 2009. Image Entertainment is scheduled to release the DVD in May 2010.

== Reception ==
Owl and the Sparrow won awards such as best narrative feature at the 2007 San Francisco International Asian American Film Festival, best narrative feature at the 2007 San Diego Asian Film Festival, the audience award at the 2007 Los Angeles Film Festival, and the emerging filmmaker award at the 2007 Starz Denver Film Festival.

Director Stephane Gauger was nominated for the Breakthrough Director Award at the 2007 Gotham Awards, and for the John Cassavetes award at the 2008 Independent Spirit Awards.

The film received positive reviews in the U.S. and currently holds a 79% approval rating on Rotten Tomatoes, based on 19 reviews.

== Cast ==
- Cat Ly as Lan
- Le The Hu as Hai
- Pham Gia Han as Thuy
