= If You Go Down (I'm Goin' Down Too) =

Single by Kelsea Ballerini

from the album Subject to Change
- Released: December 5, 2022
- Recorded: Starstruck Studios
- Genre: Country
- Length: 2:46
- Label: Black River
- Songwriters: Kelsea Ballerini; Julian Bunetta; Shane McAnally
- Producers: Julian Bunetta; Shane McAnally

Kelsea Ballerini singles chronology
"Heartfirst" (2022)	"If You Go Down (I'm Goin' Down Too)" (2022)	"Blindsided" (2023)

Music video
- "If You Go Down (I'm Goin' Down Too)" on YouTube

"If You Go Down (I'm Goin' Down Too)" is a song recorded by American country music artist Kelsea Ballerini. It was released to country music radio on December 5, 2022, as the second single from Ballerini's fourth studio album, Subject to Change. It was written by Ballerini, Shane McAnally, and Julian Bunetta, with the latter two also producing the track. Lyrically, the song is about a supportive female friendship, with Ballerini noting that she will stick with her friend through whatever trouble she ends up getting into.

== Content ==
The song was the final one written for Subject to Change, as the majority of the album had already been cut. Ballerini and her collaborators decided to book one final writing day in case they had anything left in the tank and, when reviewing the topics covered by the songs on the album, realized there wasn't one that honored her friendships. Of this, Ballerini explained, "friends was a huge theme on my last record - the two lyrics that popped up the most on that Kelsea record were 'home' and 'friends, and so it was like I was doing a disservice to a pillar in my life to not have a song that carried that through." Speaking to Billboard, Ballerini stated that the song was written to evoke thoughts of the 1991 film Thelma & Louise and The Chicks' "Goodbye Earl", noting that “these really beautiful best-friend stories that had a tinge of murder attached” helped to inspire the song. Buetta, in turn, composed an upbeat, cheery melody and instrumentation on his guitarlele to contrast with the darkly comedic lyrics. Similarly, Ballerini took roughly two hours to record her vocals and was careful to ensure that the song's tongue-and-cheek message was conveyed effectively.

Sonically the song reflects the country pop and neotraditional country styles, with Ballerini explaining that “we really wanted to lean into a very ’90s country feel, and so we brought in fiddle for the song, which I think to me makes it. That’s also why there’s a Chicks reference to it, which everyone picks up on, which was absolutely intentional. I didn’t want to make it sound like anything else on the record. I wanted it to be its own moment.”"

In interviews, Ballerini discussed the song's significance in her personal life at the time, citing that her female friends were vital while she was going through her divorce from Morgan Evans, stating “sometimes you put out a single because you think that it's the most radio-friendly, and sometimes you put out a single because it's actually reflective of where you're at in your life," she said. "And then sometimes, both things can be true.”

== Music videos ==
The song's concept video premiered on September 16, 2022 and features Ballerini in a pastel-colored room engaging in various activities such as applying make-up, reading a book, calling a friend, cleaning and drinking wine, seemingly unfazed as the weather outside slowly worsens, ending with hurricanes, explosions and thunder and lightning.

The official music video was released on March 31, 2023.

== Live performances ==
Ballerini performed an acoustic version of the song live on her episode of CMT Storytellers, which aired on February 16, 2023. Ballerini included the song as part of the setlist of her 2022–2023 Heartfirst Tour. Ballerini performed the song at the 2023 CMT Music Awards accompanied by RuPaul's Drag Race stars Manila Luzon, Kennedy Davenport, Jan Sport and Olivia Lux.

== Personnel ==
- Julian Bunetta – producer, mandolin, Dobro, guitar
- Kelsea Ballerini – vocals
- Jenee Fleenor – fiddle
- Evan Hutchings – drums
- Shane McAnally – producer
- Craig Young – bass

== Charts ==
=== Weekly charts ===
Weekly chart performance for "If You Go Down (I'm Goin' Down Too)"
Chart (2022–2023)	Peak position
Canada Hot 100 (Billboard)	85
Canada Country (Billboard)	2
US Bubbling Under Hot 100 (Billboard)	16
US Country Airplay (Billboard)	17
US Hot Country Songs (Billboard)	32

=== Year-end charts ===
Year-end chart performance for "If You Go Down (I'm Goin' Down Too)"
Chart (2023)	Position
US Country Airplay (Billboard)	52
US Hot Country Songs (Billboard)	68

== Certifications ==
Certifications for "If You Go Down (I'm Goin' Down Too)"
Region	Certification	Certified units/sales
Australia (ARIA)	Gold	35,000^{‡}
Canada (Music Canada)	Platinum	80,000^{‡}
United States (RIAA)	Gold	500,000^{‡}
^{‡} Sales+streaming figures based on certification alone.
