= You're Drunk, Go Home =

Song by Kelsea Ballerini, Kelly Clarkson and Carly Pearce

from the album Subject to Change
- Released: September 23, 2022
- Genre: Country
- Length: 2:55
- Label: Black River
- Songwriters: Kelsea Ballerini; Julian Bunetta; Shane McAnally
- Producers: Kelsea Ballerini; Julian Bunetta; Shane McAnally

"You're Drunk, Go Home" is a song recorded by American recording artists Kelsea Ballerini, Kelly Clarkson, and Carly Pearce for Ballerini's fourth studio album, Subject to Change. Ballerini co-wrote the song with Julian Bunetta and Shane McAnally.

== Background and composition ==
"You're Drunk, Go Home" was written by Ballerini along with Julian Bunetta and Shane McAnally Ballerini hinted that there was a collaboration on her new album and posted a picture of herself in the recording studio with another singer. People guessed that it was Carly Pearce. On September 8, 2022, Ballerini announced the collaboration and confirmed that it did feature Pearce. She also said that the song was a trio and revealed that it also featured Kelly Clarkson. Pearce noted that Ballerini came to her and asked if she was interested in this song she had and that she was thinking about her, Pearce, and Clarkson. Pearce describes the collaboration as a "super fun, honky tonk-style song." She also said, "I think you could not have matched three more perfect woman at this point in their lives to sign this song." Referring to all three women's recent public divorces.

Detailing how the collaboration came together, Ballerini posted a series of text messages on her Instagram between her and an unnamed artist (later revealed to be Clarkson) where she stated that she was “finishing up my record and have a song that I wanted to turn into a sassbomb female moment and just have to ask you if you would be a part of it. It’s country as shit and I’ve also asked [Pearce] to be on it, so it would be a little trio. let me know what you think?”, to which Clarkson replied: “I love it! Love [Pearce] as well! Also, ‘country as shit’ is my favorite kind of country music ha! I’m in!”

In an interview with Billboard, Ballerini explained that she was initially against the idea of including Pearce and Clarkson on the track, admitting “I was kind of dead set on not collaborating on this album, just because I feel like I’ve done a lot of collaborating recently. I love collaborations, but I just wanted to make sure that I could stand on my own two feet.” She stated that, once the song was written, she couldn't shake the idea of an all-female trio performing it. Of Pearce's inclusion, Ballerini explained “Carly and I have been friends for, like, 10 years, before either of us had anything going on and we’ve just seen each other personally and professionally through so many seasons of life. We’ve always wanted to do a song together and this made sense.” She then explained that Clarkson was chosen because she would add “a different texture, vocally” but admitted that getting her to agree to join them would be a “big ask” however, Clarkson was very enthusiastic about the song and recorded her vocals the same night. On an episode of her talk show where she interviewed Ballerini, Clarkson revealed that she was drunk when recording her parts of the song, having just celebrated her last day of work before a summer break.

== Promotion ==
Ballerini, Clarkson and Pearce performed the song together live for the first time at the 56th Annual Country Music Association Awards on November 9, 2022.

== Charts ==
Chart (2022)	Peak position
US Country Digital Song Sales (Billboard)	22
