= Maren Niemeyer =

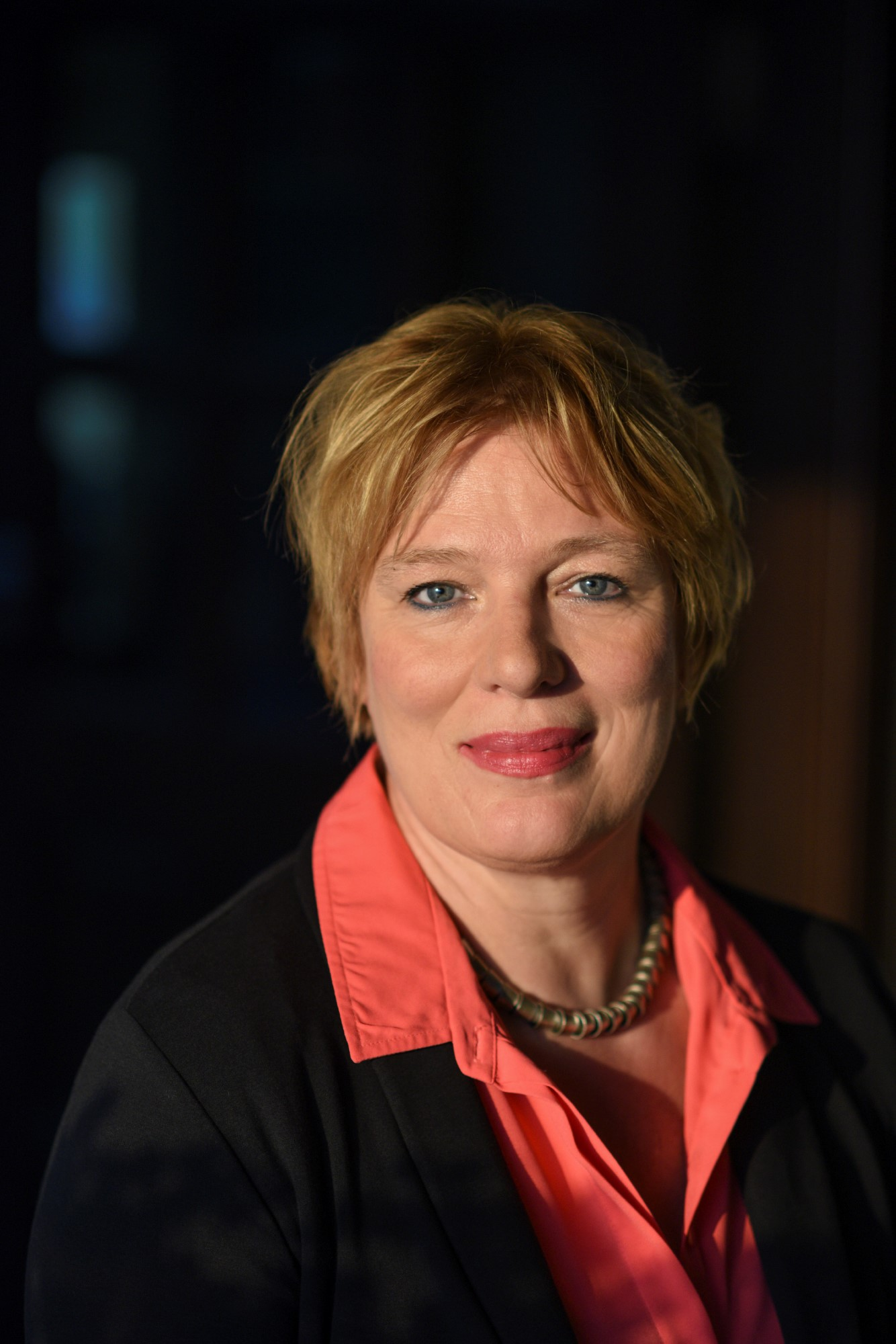
Maren Niemeyer portrait photographed by Ralf Tooten

Maren Niemeyer (born 8 May 1964) is a German journalist, documentary filmmaker and cultural manager

== Life ==
Niemeyer was born in the Hanseatic city of Bremen and took her A-levels at the Kippenberg Gymnasium. She studied journalism, German philology and film studies at the Sorbonne in Paris and Freien Universität Berlin from 1984 till 1990. At her dissertation, which she handed in only a couple of months after the Fall of the Berlin Wall, she studied the film history of the DDR and its film company DEFA which had been largely unknown in West Germany.

While studying, Niemeyer launched her journalistic career. In 1986 she began working as a freelance journalist for the magazine Tempo in Hamburg, the Neue Ruhr Zeitung in Essen and S-F-Beat, a broadcast magazine for youths belonging to broadcast station Sender Freies Berlin (SFB).

In May 1991, Niemeyer travelled on an Arthur-F.-Burns scholarship to the United States. She stayed four months at the WABI TV CBS branch in Bangor, Maine, and WUSF public radio station in Tampa, Florida. Between 1991 and 1994, she worked as Berlin and East Germany correspondent for O137 interview magazine of the Pay TV broadcast station Premiere.

Since 1995, Niemeyer has worked as editor, author and duty editor for various TV shows such as Willemsens Woche, Berlin-Mitte (ZDF), Kulturreport, Sabine Christiansen (ARD), and Kultur 21 (DW-TV). From 2000 to 2006 she was in charge of the German-French ARTE woman-magazine LOLA and the German editorial department of the ARTE lifestyle magazine CHIC. From 2007 to 2009 Niemeyer worked as editor at the head office of the ARTE's culture channel in Strasbourg and in the NDR ARTE editorial department in Hamburg, where she was responsible for various culture and documentary slots.

Niemeyer was producer of various programmes for ARTE, SWR, WDR and Deutsche Welle TV. She produced the miniseries about the magic hippie trail Die Karawane der Blumenkinder (2008) in collaboration with Thomas Kufus and his production company Zero One Film. In 2009 Niemeyer also produced a three-part series about German design, Faszination, Form, Farbe, which was nominated for the German Economy Film Award in 2009.

Niemeyer was one of the episode directors in the ARTE/RBB production 24h Berlin. She also directed the documentary tetralogy Liebe ohne Grenzen ZDF/ARTE, for which she was nominated with the Adolf-Grimme-Preis in 2010. In 2011 Niemeyer created the documentary Planet Goethe – 60 Jahre Goethe-Institut for Goethe-Institut and DW-TV. Since December 2009 Niemeyer has worked as a TV and radio broadcast representative of the Goethe-Institut, where she is responsible for media cooperation worldwide. Until July 2022 Maren Niemeyer was the Director of the Goethe-Institut Thailand in Bangkok and also responsible for the German-related cultural programms in Cambodia and Laos. Since July 2022 Maren Niemeyer is leading the Goethe-Institut Usbekistan in Tashkent and is in charge for the German language and culture programming in the centralasia neighbor country Tadschikistan.

== Selected filmography ==
- Die Richardstrasse in Neukölln. Student Film Project, Germany 1987, 45 Min., Production: SFB Student Film Project
- Wie Deutschland sich lieben lernt – drei Ost-West Paare berichten. Documentary, Germany 1995, 30 Min., Production: SFB/WDR
- Das große Schweigen – Bordelle in Konzentrationslagern. Documentary, Germany, 1995, 30 Min., Director: Maren Niemeyer, Caroline von der Tann, Production: ARD/ORB
- Learys letzter Trip – Porträt des Drogen-Gurus TIMOTHY LEARY. Documentary, Germany, 1996, 55 Min., Director: Maren Niemeyer, Roger Willemsen, Production: ARTE/ZDF
- Der letzte Grieche – Portrait von Anthony Quinn. Documentary, Germany 1996, 30 Min,. with Roger Willemsen, Production: ORB
- Prinzessin für einen Tag, Schloss Hoppenrade und seine Geschichte(n). Documentary, Germany, 2001, 30 Min., Production: ORB
- 100 Prozent Schokolade, die Geschichte der Schweizer Schokoladenfabrik Cima Norma. Documentary, Germany, 2006, 60 Min., Production: ARTE
- High Sein, Frei sein, überall dabei sein – Auf dem Hippietrail nach Kabul. Documentary,

Germany 2007, 30 Min., Production: ARTE

- Bilderbuch Deutschland – Spreewald. Documentary, Germany, 2007, 45 Min., Production: RBB/ ARD
- Die Karawane der Blumenkinder, Teil 1 - High sein, frei sein, Teil 2 Am Ziel der Träume. Documentary, Germany 2008, 2 x 45 Min., Production: WDR/ SWR

== Awards and film festivals ==
- 1987: Die Richardstrasse in Neukölln, nominated for the Goldene Taube at the Documentary Film Festival Leipzig.
- 1995: Das große Schweigen – Bordelle in Konzentrationslagern, nominated for the Prix d'Europe.
- 2009: Faszination, Form, Farbe – Kommunikationsdesign aus Deutschland, nominated for the German Economy Film Award. The film also participated at the FIFA Film festival Montreal 2010.
