= Sandcastle (film) =

- Film poster
- 沙城
- Directed by: Boo Junfeng
- Written by: Boo Junfeng
- Produced by: Fran Borgia; Gary Goh
- Cinematography: Sharon Loh
- Edited by: Natalie Soh
- Music by: Darren Ng
- Distributed by: Golden Village Pictures (Singapore)
- Release dates: May 2010 (Cannes); 26 August 2010 (Singapore)
- Running time: 92 minutes
- Country: Singapore
- Languages: Mandarin Chinese; English; Hokkien

Sandcastle is a 2010 feature film by Singaporean director Boo Junfeng. It was the first Singaporean film to be screened at the Critics' Week at the Cannes Film Festival. It won Best Feature Film and Best Director at the 1st Hanoi International Film Festival.

== Plot ==
Just prior to 18-year-old En's mandatory enlistment into the Singaporean army, a series of events and disclosures threatens to alter his world view forever. The taste of his first romance, the death of his grandfather, his grandmother's worsening Alzheimer's disease, his schoolteacher mother's affair with an uptight military commander, and En's newfound awareness of his late father's student activist past all contribute to his decision to reevaluate the pieces of his life before they are erased by the tides of time.

== Cast ==
- Bobbi Chen as Ying
- Elena Chia as Mother
- Bee Thiam Tan as Army Officer
- Joshua Tan as En
- Pin Pin Tan as Doctor
