= Codes and Secret Longing =

Studio album by Raised by Swans
- Released: April 11, 2005
- Recorded: 2002–2004; House of Miracles; London, Ontario, Canada
- Length: 1:04:57
- Label: 1101

Raised by Swans chronology
Codes and Secret Longing (2005)	No Ghostless Place (2010)

Codes and Secret Longing is the debut studio album by Canadian solo artist Raised by Swans. It was written in its entirety by Eric Howden, recorded at Andy Magoffin's studio, House of Miracles, and released on April 11, 2005. The album cover features the two protagonists of the film Grave of the Fireflies.

== Track listing ==
All music and lyrics written by Howden.

1. "A Cipher In A Foreign Sky" - 1:56
2. "Violet Light" - 5:03
3. "There Is No Escape" - 6:35
4. "Capable of Cruelty" - 4:04
5. "Sandcastles" - 3:45
6. "Still Inside You" - 4:49
7. "Phantom Limb / Divided By Night" - 8:09
8. "Relentless" - 4:03
9. "Imagined Life" - 4:01
10. "The Moment That I'll Miss" - 3:37
11. "Scent" - 6:34
12. "Drag The Morning" - 4:19
13. "Unrequited / Stolen Lakes" - 8:07

== Performance credits ==
- Eric Howden – electric and acoustic guitars, all tracks; lead and harmony vocals, all tracks; bass guitar, all tracks; piano, all tracks; synthesizer, all tracks; hammond organ, all tracks; dial tone, track 12; drum loop, track 9
- Brady Parr – drums and percussion, all tracks
- Chris Donais – additional guitar, tracks 3, 5, 6, 10, 11, 12

== Film and television ==
Film

- Douglas Coupland's film Everything's Gone Green (2007) featured Violet Light.
- Atom Egoyan's Adoration (2008) featured Capable Of Cruelty, Still Inside You, and Phantom Limb/ Divided By Night.

Television

- Canadian television series ReGenesis featured Violet Light and Relentless in Season 2: Episodes 3 and 4, respectively (2007).
- CTV's Whister featured Violet Light in Episode 8 (2007).
- MTV Canada's Peak Season featured Violet Light, Phantom Limb/ Divided By Night and Relentless in Episodes 1, 6 and 8, respectively (2009).
- Canadian television series Continuum featured Imagined Life at the end of the episode in Season 4: Episodes 2 (2015).
