= So You Think You Can Dance (Vietnamese TV series) season 1 =

So You Think You Can Dance
- Season 1
- No. of episodes: 22 + 4 documentaries

Release
- Original network: HTV7 (HCMC); HTV2 (Hanoi); CVTV1 (Cần Thơ); DRT (Da Nang); YanTV
- Original release: September 15 – December 15, 2012

Season chronology
- Next → Season 2

Thử thách cùng bước nhảy: So You Think You Can Dance is a Vietnamese televised dance competition and an entry in the international So You Think You Can Dance television franchise. The show is produced by Dong Tay Promotion Company and began broadcasting its first season on September 15, 2012. Chí Anh from Bước nhảy hoàn vũ is set to be permanent judge, with additional permanent judges yet to be announced. Guest judges include Ngô Thanh Vân, broadway staff John Huy Trần, choreographer Trần Ly Ly, rapper Việt Max, and host Thanh Bạch. The show's winner will receive 400 million đồng and a choice between several career advancement opportunities.

== Format ==
The show will feature twenty-three episodes, and a format similar to that of the original U.S. series in season 2-8. The first season will begin with three open audition episodes in which dancers (both professional and amateur, from any stylistic background and of ages from 16 to 30) can attempt to impress a panel of judges with their ability and earn a spot amongst the Top 100 competitors in the Ho Chi Minh City Semi-finals, which will represent one episode. The various rounds of the semi-finals will reduce these 100 contestant to a Top 20, who will then be paired into ten couples that will go on to perform in nine successive live shows, each of which will be followed by a results show, all culminating in a live finale.

== Auditions ==
Open auditions for the first season were held in the following locations:

Air Date	Audition Venue	City	Audition Date(s)	Judges	Tickets
September 15, 2012	Vietnam Television Center, Cần Thơ	Cần Thơ City	23-07-2012	John Huy Trần; Việt Max; Thu Hà	9
September 15, 2012	Hanoi Opera House	Hanoi	31-07-2012 & 01-08-2012	John Huy Trần; Viết Thành; Tuyết Minh	42
September 22, 2012	Trưng Vương Theatre	Da Nang	05-08-2012	John Huy Trần; Viết Thành; Tuyết Minh	7
September 22, 2012	Nguyễn Du Gymnasium	Ho Chi Minh City	11-08-2012 & 12-08-2012	John Huy Trần; Việt Max; Thu Hà	52

=== HCMC week ===
The Ho Chi Minh City callbacks will be held in Ho Chi Minh City. Over 100 participating contestants will be cut down through successive rounds to a Top 20 who will be announced live during a dancer showcase episode.

Judges
Chí Anh, John Huy, Viết Thành, Việt Max, Thu Hà, Tuyết Minh
Task/style	Music	Choreographer(s)	Note(s)
Individual solo	Music chosen by contestant	The dancer	None
Hip-Hop	"TBA"	Jean-Marie Neef and Valerie Neef	27 eliminated / 80 through
Broadway	"TBA"	Rosie Pollard and TBA	17 eliminated / 63 through
Ballroom (Samba)	"TBA"	Chí Anh	14 eliminated / 49 through
Group routines	Chosen at random from a selection of songs	The dancers	Contestants were allowed to choose their own groups 8 eliminated / 41 through
Contemporary	"TBA"	John Huy Trần	7 eliminated / 34 through
Individual solo	Music chosen by contestant	The dancer	14 eliminated / Top 20 Finalists revealed

== Finals ==
=== Top 20 Finalists ===
==== Females ====
Finalist	Age	Home Town	Dance Style	Elimination date	Placement
Lại Thị Sao Mai	21	Hanoi	Hip-hop	Oct. 14, 2012	10th
Hoàng Ngọc Dung	21	Haiphong	Contemporary/Folkdance	Oct. 21, 2012	9th
Huỳnh Thị Mến	22	HCMC	Jazz/Funk	Oct. 28, 2012	8th
Trần Thụy Trúc Phương	25	Đắk Lắk Province	Hip-hop	Nov. 04, 2012	7th
Nguyễn Hoàng Thảo Uyên	18	HCMC	Latin	Nov. 11, 2012	6th (Injured, quit)
Nguyễn Thị Thúy Hằng	30	Hanoi	Contemporary	Nov. 18, 2012	5th
Lê Kim Phụng	23	HCMC	Jazz/Funk	Nov. 25, 2012	4th
Chu Quỳnh Trang	18	Hanoi	Latin	Dec. 02, 2012	3rd
Võ Hồng Nhung	23	HCMC	Contemporary	Dec. 15, 2012	2nd
Lâm Tố Như	17	HCMC	Contemporary/Ballet	Dec. 15, 2012	1st

==== Males ====
Finalist	Age	Home Town	Dance Style	Elimination date	Placement
Trần Anh Huy	20	Sóc Trăng Province	Hip-hop/Jazz	Oct. 14, 2012	10th
Nguyễn Anh Toàn		Nam Định	Contemporary	Oct. 21, 2012	9th
Nguyễn Phước Tư Duy	27	Thừa Thiên–Huế Province	Contemporary/Popping	Oct. 28, 2012	8th (Withdraw)
Đoàn Trung Hiếu	21	HCMC	Hip-hop	Nov. 04, 2012	7th
Tạ Xuân Chiến	27	Thái Bình Province	Contemporary	Nov. 11, 2012	6th
Nguyễn Toàn Trung	22	Hanoi	Popping/Animating	Nov. 18, 2012	5th
Đặng Minh Hiền	22	Hanoi	Contemporary	Nov. 25, 2012	4th
Nguyễn Tuấn Đạt	17	Quảng Nam Province	Latin	Dec. 02, 2012	3rd
Đỗ Quang Đăng	23	Bến Tre Province	Hip-hop	Dec. 15, 2012	2nd
Lâm Vinh Hải	23	HCMC	Hip-hop	Dec. 15, 2012	Winner

==== Elimination Chart ====
Legend
Female	Male	Bottom 3 couples	Bottom 4 contestants	Injury	Withdraw

Week:	10/14	10/21	10/28	11/04	11/11	11/18	11/25	12/02	12/15
Contestant	Result								
Lâm Vinh Hải	Btm 3				Btm 3	Btm 4	Btm 4		Winner
Lâm Tố Như									Runner-Up
Đỗ Quang Đăng									3rd Place
Võ Hồng Nhung									4th Place
Nguyễn Tuấn Đạt								Elim	
Chu Quỳnh Trang	Btm 3				Injury^{1}		Btm 4	Elim	
Đặng Minh Hiền							Elim		
Lê Kim Phụng						Btm 4	Elim		
Nguyễn Toàn Trung			Btm 3	Btm 3	Btm 3	Elim			
Nguyễn Thị Thúy Hằng			Btm 3	Btm 3	Btm 2	Elim			
Tạ Xuân Chiến			Btm 3	Btm 3	Elim				
Nguyễn Hoàng Thảo Uyên			Btm 3	Btm 3	Injury^{2}				
Đoàn Trung Hiếu		Btm 3		Elim					
Trần Thụy Trúc Phương		Btm 3		Elim					
Nguyễn Phước Tư Duy		Btm 3	WD						
Huỳnh Thị Mến		Btm 3	Elim						
Nguyễn Anh Toàn	Btm 2	Elim							
Hoàng Ngọc Dung	Btm 3	Elim							
Trần Anh Huy	Elim								
Lại Thị Sao Mai	Elim								

^1 Quỳnh Trang injured about prior to performance show, then she was forced to "dance for life" on week 6.
^2 Thảo Uyên was injured since last week results show, then she was forced to "dance for life" on week 5 results show, but it was cancelled due to injury again and she voluntarily left the show.

== Post-show ==
A spin-off miniseries named Liên hoan tài năng cùng bước nhảy (literally: Festival of Talents and Dances) was created and set to air from December 29, featuring notable contestants from the first season and their own dance crews. Beginning in week one is hip-hop theme show, named Festival HipHop Culture.

== Syndication ==
No.	Air Date	Title	Notes
01	September 15, 2012	Audition 1	
02	September 22, 2012	Audition 2	
03	September 29, 2012	Semifinal Round 1	
04	October 6, 2012	Sepmifinal Round 2	
05	October 13, 2012	Top 20 Performs	
06	October 14, 2012	Top 20 Results Show	
07	October 20, 2012	Top 18 Performs	
08	October 21, 2012	Top 18 Results Show	
09	October 27, 2012	Top 16 Performs	
10	October 28, 2012	Top 16 Results Show	
11	November 3, 2012	Top 14 Performs	
12	November 4, 2012	Top 14 Results Show	
13	November 10, 2012	Top 12 Performs	
14	November 11, 2012	Top 12 Results Show	
15	November 17, 2012	Top 10 Performs	
16	November 18, 2012	Top 10 Results Show	
17	November 24, 2012	Top 08 Performs	
18	November 25, 2012	Top 08 Results Show	
19	December 1, 2012	Top 06 Performs	
20	December 2, 2012	Top 06 Results Show	
21	December 8, 2012	Top 04 Performs	
22	December 15, 2012	Grand Finale	
+1	December 29, 2012	Festival of Talents and Dances: Hip-Hop	
+2	January 5, 2013	Festival of Talents and Dances: Dance-Sports	
+3	January 12, 2013	Festival of Talents and Dances: Contemporary	
+4	January 19, 2013	Festival of Talents and Dances: The Gala	

== See also ==
- Dance on television
