= Stephane Gauger =

American film director (1969–2018)

- Born: August 30, 1969; Saigon, South Vietnam
- Died: January 11, 2018 (aged 48); Ho Chi Minh City, Vietnam
- Occupations: Film director, screenwriter, cinematographer

Stephane Gauger (August 30, 1969 – January 11, 2018) was a Vietnamese-born American film director, screenwriter and cinematographer.

== Biography ==
Born in Saigon, South Vietnam to an American civilian contractor and his Vietnamese wife, Gauger was raised in Fountain Valley, California and graduated from California State University, Fullerton in theatre arts and French literature.

=== Cinematography work ===
He met cinematographer Matthew Libatique at CSUF and apprenticed under him as a camera loader and lighting technician. While working on thesis films at Loyola Marymount University, he met filmmaker brothers Tony Bui and Timothy Bui and worked as a lighting technician on their feature films Three Seasons (1999), directed by Tony Bui and Green Dragon (2001), directed by Timothy Bui. Gauger also worked as a key grip on the feature film Six-String Samurai (1998), directed by Lance Mungia, as a gaffer in the Vietnamese action film The Rebel (2007), directed by Charlie Nguyen and as a gaffer in Ham Tran's Journey from the Fall (2006). Gauger also served as a cinematographer on short films such as Moonlight (2006), directed by Alice Chen; Good Bad Karma (2006), directed by David Takemura; Jim and Kim (2010), directed by Victor Teran; and Finding Gauguin (2010), directed by Lee Donald Taicher. Gauger also served as his own cinematographer on films he directed, including Vietnam Overtures, Owl and the Sparrow (2007) and Saigon Electric (2011).

== Films ==
=== Owl and the Sparrow ===
Gauger directed the short film Seabirds (1998) before his first feature Owl and the Sparrow (2007), which premiered at the Rotterdam International Film Festival and won over 15 awards at international film festivals. It was released theatrically in the U.S. in January 2009. Owl and the Sparrow also won the audience award at the 2007 Los Angeles Film Festival, a NETPAC award at the 2007 Hawaii International Film Festival, the Crystal Heart Award at the 2007 Heartland Film Festival, the emerging filmmaker award (for Gauger) at the 2007 Denver Film Festival, a best narrative feature award at the 2007 San Francisco International Asian American Film Festival, a jury award for Best Narrative Feature at the 2007 San Diego Asian Film Festival, the Critic's Choice Award and the Best Foreign Co-Production Awards at the 2009 Golden Kite Awards in Hanoi and the Festival Prize at the 2007 Big Apple Film Festival. Gauger also was nominated for a Gotham Award in 2007 (Best Breakthrough Director) and the John Cassavetes Award at the Independent Spirit Awards in 2008 for the film.

=== Vietnam Overtures ===
Gauger's music documentary (and first documentary) Vietnam Overtures (2008) is about a music exchange program between Norway and the music institutions of Vietnam and premiered at the 2008 Hawaii International Film Festival.

=== Saigon Electric ===
Gauger's second feature film Saigon Electric was made in 2011 and it covers the various dance cultures in Vietnam. The film won Best Film and Best Actress (Quynh Hoa, who played the lead character, Kim) at the Golden Kite Awards in Hanoi. The film also won Best Narrative Feature Film and an audience award for narrative feature at the 2011 Philadelphia Asian American Film Festival and won a Special Jury Prize for Best Screenplay - Narrative at the 2011 Los Angeles Asian Pacific Film Festival. The film screened at festivals such as the Los Angeles Asian Pacific Film Festival, the San Diego Asian Film Festival Spring Showcase, the San Francisco International Asian American Film Festival, the Hong Kong International Film Festival, The Chicago Asian American Film Showcase at the Gene Siskel Film Center, the Vietnamese International Film Festival, the Silk Screen Asian American Film Festival, the Seattle International Film Festival, the Asian Film Festival of Dallas, the Asian American International Film Festival, the DC APA Film Festival, the Toronto Reel Asian International Film Festival, the Heartland Film Festival, the Berlin Asian Film Festival, the Hawaii International Film Festival and more.

=== Chinatown Squad ===
Gauger directed and produced a TV pilot written by Feodor Chin and Will Henning entitled Chinatown Squad, which focuses on a four-man squad of San Francisco police officers in the 1980s that attempt to clean up Chinatown from corruption. The pilot stars Feodor Chin (as Chinese mob boss villain, Pistol Pete) as well as Kelvin Han Yee (as Uncle Wong), David Huynh (as Fong) and Robert Wu (as the translator specialist of the squad).

Gauger also directed a short film titled The Moral Paper Route (2012), that starred actors from Chinatown Squad, including Feodor Chin as the father, Rita Huang as the mother and David Huynh as the son.

=== Cheetah: The Nelson Vails Story ===
Gauger directed a documentary in 2014 entitled Cheetah: The Nelson Vails Story on former Olympic road and track cyclist Nelson Vails.

=== Kiss and Spell (Yêu Đi, Đừng Sợ!) ===
Gauger's penultimate film, Yêu Đi, Đừng Sợ! (Translated as "Kiss and Spell") (2017) is a Vietnamese romantic comedy about a magician who is afraid of ghosts who falls in love with a girl that appears to have some connection to the supernatural. It was released on August 25, 2017, in Vietnam and distributed by CJ Entertainment Vietnam. It was also a Vietnamese language remake of a similar Korean film known as Spellbound and won the Audience Award at the 2017 National Film Festival (or Da Nang Film Festival) in Da Nang.

=== My Brother Vincent ===
Gauger's final film (released posthumously) was the documentary My Brother Vincent (2018), which was about the play initially written and performed by Leonard Nimoy in the 1970s on the life of painter Vincent van Gogh. French actor Jean-Michel Richaud brought the play back in 2018 and the documentary features interviews with Nimoy, Richaud and various Van Gogh historians, as well as segments covering Van Gogh's career and important regions during his life such as south of France (where he painted most of his work), Belgium (where he was a preacher to coal miners) and the Netherlands (his birthplace).

=== Writing Work ===
Gauger wrote the story for the crime drama film Powder Blue (2009), directed by Timothy Bui and starring Jessica Biel, Forest Whitaker, Eddie Redmayne, Ray Liotta, Lisa Kudrow and Patrick Swayze.

Gauger wrote the screenplay for a short film entitled Finding Gauguin (2010), directed by Lee Donald Taicher. Gauger also wrote screenplays for the films he has directed, including Owl and the Sparrow and Saigon Electric.

== Awards and nominations ==
Gauger is a nominee of the Breakthrough Director Award at the 2007 Gotham Awards and the John Cassavetes Award at the 2008 Independent Spirit Awards (for his work with Owl and the Sparrow (2007). Also for his work for that film, he received the emerging director award at the 2007 Starz Denver Film Festival. Gauger was also featured in Filmmaker Magazine’s 25 new faces of 2007.

== Death and legacy ==
On January 11, 2018, Gauger died after a stroke at the age of 48 in Vietnam.

== Filmography as director ==
- Yêu Đi, Đừng Sợ! (Kiss and Tell) (2017)
- Cheetah: The Nelson Vails Story (Documentary) (2014)
- The Moral Paper Route (Short) (2012)
- Chinatown Squad (TV movie) (2012)
- Saigon Electric (2010)
- Vietnam Overtures (Documentary) (2008)
- Owl and the Sparrow (2007)

== Partial filmography as writer ==
- Saigon Electric (2010)
- Finding Gauguin (2010) (short film)
- Powder Blue (2009)
- Owl and the Sparrow (2007)
