= Raised by Swans =

Canadian musician

- Origin: London, Ontario, Canada
- Genres: Indie rock, shoegazing
- Years active: 1998–present
- Label: 1101
- Members: Eric Howden
- Website: raisedbyswans.com

Raised by Swans is the recording alias of a Canadian solo artist, Eric Howden. A singer-songwriter and multi-instrumentalist, Howden chose the name 'Raised By Swans' in 1997 following a cathartic dream he had after leaving his previous band, The Gandharvas; the name relies on a homonym ('raise': to rear; to elevate) to convey a simultaneous sense of connection and freedom.

Howden composes his songs using a multi-track recorder, guitar, bass, drum machine, and keyboard, writing all parts for all instruments, as well as all the lyrics. This process contributes to his relatively slow recording and releasing pace. His music has been described as haunting and contemplative.

In a 2013 interview, Howden explained that pride in his body of work eventually overcame his discomfort in referring to Raised By Swans as "I" instead of "we". In his words: "Raised By Swans is and always has been a solo project, not a band. That fact hasn't been made clear in the past, which is wholly my fault; well-meaning but misguided attempts at modesty and inclusion have clouded the truth. I'm honoured to have such gifted musicians alongside me onstage...but if someone else happens to play a part on an album of mine, for instance, they're playing a part I've written."

== Discography ==
=== Studio albums ===
- Codes and Secret Longing, 1101 (independent), 2005
- No Ghostless Place, 1101 (independent), 2010
- Öxnadalur, 1101 (independent), 2014
- Raised by Swans Is the Name of a Man, 1101 (independent), 2021

=== Singles ===
- "Sightings", 1101 (independent), 2013
- "Trains We Both Missed" / "Pale Blue Black Holes", 1101 (independent), 2016

Raised By Swans' first two full-length studio albums (Codes and Secret Longing, 2005, and No Ghostless Place, 2010) were recorded, mixed and mastered at Andy Magoffin's House of Miracles studio, then located in London, Ontario. The studio has since moved to Cambridge, Ontario.

Raised By Swans released the single "Sightings" on 19 July 2013, through Bandcamp exclusively. The song was written and recorded by Howden following a trip to Berlin, Germany, in 2012. This was followed by his third studio album, Öxnadalur, in November 2014 and a double single "Trains We Both Missed" / "Pale Blue Black Holes" in September 2016.

== In film ==
Raised By Swans' song "Violet Light" is featured in Douglas Coupland's film Everything's Gone Green.

Armenian-Canadian film director Atom Egoyan is a fan of Howden's music, and has included his songs in two of his films. Three songs from Codes and Secret Longing are featured in Adoration (2008), and two songs from No Ghostless Place appear in Chloe (2009). The live version of the band, as it was in 2009, also plays themselves in Chloe, performing sections of "We Were Never Young" and "Longer Shadows, Shorter Days" live at The Rivoli in Toronto, Ontario.
