= Heartfirst =

Single by Kelsea Ballerini

from the album Subject to Change
- Released: April 8, 2022
- Genre: Country pop
- Length: 3:07
- Label: Black River
- Songwriters: Kelsea Ballerini; Karen Fairchild; Alysa Vanderheym
- Producers: Kelsea Ballerini; Shane McAnally; Julian Bunetta

Kelsea Ballerini singles chronology
"I Quit Drinking" (2021)	"Heartfirst" (2022)	"If You Go Down (I'm Goin' Down Too)" (2022)

Music video
- "Heartfirst" on YouTube

"Heartfirst" is a song recorded by American country music artist Kelsea Ballerini. It was released to country music radio on April 8, 2022, as the first single from Ballerini's fourth studio album, Subject to Change. Ballerini co-wrote the song with Alysa Vanderheym and Little Big Town member Karen Fairchild.

== Content ==
"Heartfirst" is the lead single to Kelsea Ballerini's fourth studio album. She wrote the song with Alysa Vanderheym and Little Big Town vocalist Karen Fairchild in July 2021. According to Ballerini, it was the first song that she ever wrote where she did not come up with the title first; instead, the opening line "Met him at a party/ Accidentally brushed his body/ On the way to get a drink at the bar" was the first lyric she wrote for the song. In the chorus, Ballerini sings of "jumping in" to a relationship "heart first", or uncertain of the outcome. After recording the demo with Vanderheym and Fairchild, she began recording the song in early 2022 with producers Shane McAnally, and Julian Bunetta. The final recording was one semitone higher than the demo and slightly faster in tempo, which according to Ballerini made the song "brighter". McAnally and Bunetta also encouraged Ballerini to change the order of the verses and add a bridge.

The final arrangement includes Evan Hutchings on drums, Craig Young on bass guitar, Alex Wright on synthesizer, Whit Wright on steel guitar, and Bunetta on piano, guitar, and mandolin. Ballerini also sang her own harmonies on the recording, with some parts of the song featuring eight vocal tracks dubbed over each other.

In an interview with Billboard, Ballerini stated that "Hearfirst" was influenced by the music of The Corrs, specifically their 2000's hit "Breathless" and later told People that the song was "the lovechild of The Corrs and Sheryl Crow, with a little Shania sprinkled on top".

== Critical reception ==
Billy Dukes of Taste of Country wrote of the song, "A dreamy, acoustic open pins a vibrant arrangement that sits deeper in the mix than much of what Ballerini has released before. The song isn't quite a vocal showcase, but a story showcase." He also described the song's lyrical theme as "instant romance", while considering the sound "country pop".

Rebecca Mills of Culturess positively compared the song to Taylor Swift's album Fearless.

The song was nominated for a Grammy.

== Commercial performance ==
"Heartfirst" debuted at number 24 on the Billboard Country Airplay chart dated for April 16, 2022. It peaked at 22.

== Charts ==
=== Weekly charts ===
Weekly chart performance for "Heartfirst"
Chart (2022–2023)	Peak position
Canada Country (Billboard)	33
US Bubbling Under Hot 100 (Billboard)	6
US Adult Pop Airplay (Billboard)	24
US Country Airplay (Billboard)	22
US Hot Country Songs (Billboard)	19

=== Year-end charts ===
2022 year-end chart performance for "Heartfirst"
Chart (2022)	Position
US Hot Country Songs (Billboard)	60
