= Saigon Electric =

- Directed by: Stephane Gauger
- Written by: Stephane Gauger
- Produced by: Danny Do; Elizabeth Ai; Stephane Gauger
- Starring: Van Trang; Quynh Hoa; Ha Hien; Khuong Ngoc; Elly Tran Ha; Viet Max
- Music by: DJ Slim; Pete Nguyen
- Production company: Chanh Phuong Films
- Distributed by: Fat Media; Annam Pictures
- Release date: 22 April 2011
- Running time: 103 minutes
- Country: Vietnam
- Language: Vietnamese

Saigon Electric, also known as Sài Gòn Yo!, is a 2011 Vietnamese hip hop film directed by Stephane Gauger. It was released on 22 April 2011 in larger cities and provinces in Vietnam, including Hanoi, Saigon, Da Nang and Can Tho.

== Plot ==
A street performer befriends a ribbon dancer named Mai, and their partnership begins to lead to a better life, until a rich kid shows interest in her.

== Cast ==
- Van Trang as Mai
- Quynh Hoa as Kim
- Ha Pham Anh Hien as Do-Boy
- Khuong Ngoc as Hai
- Elly Tran Ha as Hoa
- Viet Max as Leader of North Killaz
- Phan Tan Thi as "The Professor"
- Nguyen Hau as Director
- Huu Luan as Hai's father
- Kim Xuan as Mai's mother
