= Kim Jiseok (festival programmer) =

- Born: 1959; South Korea
- Died: May 18, 2017 (aged 57–58); Cannes, France
- Occupation: Festival programmer
- Spouse: Hong Eun-ok (m. 1996)
- Children: 1 son (Kim Se-hyeon)

Korean name
- Hangul: 김지석
- RR: Gim Jiseok
- MR: Kim Chisŏk

Kim Jiseok (1959 – 18 May 2017) was a South Korean co-founder, deputy director and head programmer of Busan International Film Festival (BIFF).

== Kim Jiseok award ==
In 2017, an award was established known as Kim Jiseok award in his honour by The Busan International Film Festival. In a press release the festival announced, "BIFF launches the Kim Jiseok Award to always remember the late executive programmer and the festival's identity and spirit." The award honours two winners among 10 world premieres shown in the 'Window on Asian Cinema' section for introducing new films from the year's most talented Asian filmmakers. Each film is awarded a cash prize of US$10,000.
