= Boo Junfeng =

Singaporean filmmaker

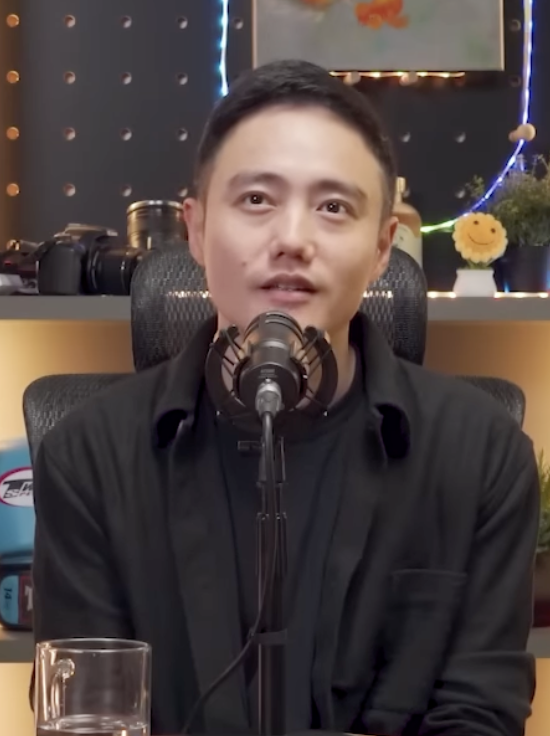
- Boo in 2025
- Born: 4 December 1983 (age 42); Singapore
- Education: Ngee Ann Polytechnic; LASALLE College of the Arts
- Occupation: Filmmaker
- Years active: 2004–present
- Website: boojunfeng.com

Boo Junfeng (Chinese: 巫俊锋; pinyin: wū jùn fēng; born 4 December 1983) is a Singaporean filmmaker. Boo's films, Sandcastle (2010) and Apprentice (2016) have been screened at the Cannes Film Festival, beginning with his debut film, Sandcastle, which was an Critics' Week nominee.

== Early life and education ==
Boo is a Singaporean of Chinese ethnicity, belonging to the Hokkien language supgroup. He graduated from the School of Film & Media Studies at Ngee Ann Polytechnic in 2003, and from the Puttnam School of Film, LASALLE College of the Arts, in 2009, where he was accorded the McNally Award for Excellence in the Arts – the valedictorian honour of the college.

== Career ==
Boo's films, many of which show a preoccupation with places and historical and personal memory, had won prizes and acclaim and had been shown in film festivals around the world. Boo's debut feature film Sandcastle (2010) was the first Singaporean film to be invited to the Critics' Week section at the Cannes Film Festival. Notable short films include Un Retrato De Familia (2004), Katong Fugue (2007), Keluar Baris (2008) and Tanjong Rhu (2009).

In 2013, Boo won the President's Young Talents Credit Suisse Artist Commissioning Award for a video art piece, Mirror. Later that year, he participated at the Singapore Biennale with Happy and Free, a video installation that depicted a Singapore that remained a part of Malaysia in 2013 and was celebrating the 50th anniversary of the territories' merger. Boo's short film, "Parting" was released as part of the omnibus titled 7 Letters (2015) to commemorate Singapore's 50th year of independence.

Boo's second feature film Apprentice (2016) was selected at the Un Certain Regard section of the 2016 Cannes Film Festival. Executively produced by filmmaker Eric Khoo, the film is a psychological drama about a young Malay correctional officer who is transferred to Singapore's top prison where he befriends its soon-to-retire chief executioner. He also revealed in an interview that he is personally against the death penalty in Singapore.

In 2016, Boo received the Rising Director award at the 21st Busan International Film Festival's Asia Star Awards.

Boo was selected as the creative director of the Singapore National Day Parade in 2018, 2021 and Singapore's diamond jubilee in 2025.

== Filmography ==
- Plague (part of 15 Shorts; 2018)
- Apprentice (2016)
- 7 Letters (omnibus - segment "Parting"; 2015)
- Sandcastle (2010)
- Tanjong Rhu (aka The Casuarina Cove) (short; 2009)
- Keluar Baris / Homecoming (short; 2008)
- Bedok Jetty (short; 2008)
- Lucky 7 (omnibus - segment 3; 2007)
- Katong Fugue (short; 2007)
- The Changi Murals (short; 2006)
- Guo Ke / Stranger (short; 2004)
- Un Retrato De Familia / A Family Portrait (short; 2004)

== Awards ==
- 2010 1st Hanoi International Film Festival Best Feature Film and Best Director awards (Sandcastle)
- 2016 Rising Director award, awarded in the 21st Busan International Film Festival (Apprentice)
