= So You Think You Can Dance (Vietnamese TV series) season 2 =

So You Think You Can Dance
- Season 2
- No. of episodes: 26

Release
- Original network: HTV7 (HCMC); H1/H2 (Hanoi); VTV Cần Thơ 1 (Cần Thơ); DRT (Da Nang); Yan TV (Cable); VTVcab 1 (Cable)
- Original release: August 17 – December 14, 2013

Season chronology
- ← Previous; Season 1

Thử Thách cùng bước nhảy: So You Think You Can Dance season 2 is the second season of So You Think You Can Dance Vietnamese franchise. Chí Anh and Tuyết Minh come back to the judge position in the show with fellow guest judge John Huy, Việt Max, Viết Thành etc. Trấn Thành hosts the show once again, but he is absent during the first audition weeks, replaced temporarily by Familiar Faces (Vietnam) season 1 winner Trần Khởi My.

== Auditions ==
Open auditions for the season two are held bigger, in the following six locations:

Air date	Audition venue	City	Audition date(s)	Judges	Tickets
August 17, 2013	Workers' Theatre	Hanoi	22-06-2013	John Huy, Tuyết Minh, Viết Thành & Quỳnh Lan	49
August 17, 2013	Haiphong Private University	Haiphong	19-06-2013	—N/a	49
August 24, 2013	Trưng Vương Theatre	Da Nang	27-06-2013	John Huy, Tuyết Minh, Viết Thành	10
August 24, 2013	Vietnam Television Center, Cần Thơ	Cần Thơ City	13-06-2013	John Huy, Tuyết Minh, & Việt Max	15
August 31, 2013	Saigon Opera House	Ho Chi Minh City	03 & 04-07-2013	John Huy, Tuyết Minh, & Việt Max	50
August 31, 2013	Yasaka Hotel	Nha Trang	01-07-2013	—N/a	50

=== HCMC week ===
The Ho Chi Minh City callbacks will be held in Ho Chi Minh City. 116 participating contestants will be cut down through successive rounds to a Top 20 who will be announced live during a dancer showcase episode.

Judges
Chí Anh, John Huy, Viết Thành, Việt Max, Quỳnh Lan, Tuyết Minh
Task/style	Music	Choreographer(s)	Note(s)
Individual solo	Music chosen by contestant	The dancer	16 eliminated / 100 through
Hip-Hop	"TBA"	Hà Lê	20 eliminated / 80 through
Broadway	"TBA"	Rosie Pollard	15 eliminated / 65 through
Group routines	Chosen at random from a selection of songs	The dancers	1 withdrew 13 eliminated / 51 through
Ballroom (Cha-cha-cha)	"TBA"	Chí Anh	08 eliminated / 43 through
Contemporary	"TBA"	John Huy Trần	06 eliminated / 37 through
Individual solo	Music chosen by contestant	The dancer	17 eliminated / Top 20 Finalists revealed

== Finals ==
=== Top 20 Finalists ===
==== Females ====
Finalist	Age	Home town	Dance style	Elimination date	Placement
Nguyễn Thị Mỹ Linh	20	Thái Nguyên	Contemporary	September 29, 2013	10th
Triệu Hồng Vân	19	HCMC	Jazz	October 6, 2013	9th
Trần Ngọc Thùy Vân	22	HCMC	Jazz	October 20, 2013	8th
Nguyễn Ngọc Tiên	23	HCMC	Jazz	October 24, 2013	7th (Disqualified)
Tăng Phi Phụng	23	HCMC	Contemporary	November 3, 2013	6th
Phạm Gia Hân	17	HCMC	Ballet	November 10, 2013	5th
Nguyễn Lan Anh	17	Hanoi	Hip-Hop	November 17, 2013	4th
Đoàn Vũ Minh Tú	21	HCMC	Ballet	November 24, 2013	3rd
Phạm Thị Ngọc Anh	20	Haiphong	Contemporary	December 7, 2013	2nd
Hoàng Mỹ An	17	HCMC	Ballroom	December 7, 2013	1st

==== Males ====
Finalist	Age	Home town	Dance style	Elimination date	Placement
Phạm Bảo Long	24	Hanoi	Ballroom	September 29, 2013	10th
Hoàng Chí Thanh	25	Bình Thuận	Contemporary	October 6, 2013	9th
Phạm Thế Chung	22	Quảng Ngãi	Ballet/Contemporary/Folkdance	October 20, 2013	8th
Dương Đình Hải	25	Haiphong	Hip-Hop	October 27, 2013	7th
Thái Ngọc Tuấn	27	HCMC	Contemporary	November 3, 2013	6th
Hoàng Thái Sơn	23	Cao Bằng	Contemporary	November 10, 2013	5th
Nguyễn Vũ Hoàng Minh	22	Buôn Ma Thuột	Contemporary/Jazz/Hip-Hop	November 17, 2013	4th
Đoàn Minh Trường	20	HCMC	Ballroom	November 24, 2013	3rd
Đặng Đình Lộc	23	HCMC	Contemporary	December 7, 2013	2nd
Nguyễn Ngọc Thịnh	19	HCMC	Hip-Hop	December 7, 2013	Winner

==== Elimination Chart ====
Legend
Female	Male	Bottom 3 couples	Bottom 4	Disqualified

Week:	09/29	10/06	10/20^{1}	10/27	11/03	11/10	11/17	11/24	12/07
Contestant	Result								
Nguyễn Ngọc Thịnh					Btm 3	Btm 4			Winner
Hoàng Mỹ An									Runner-Up
Đặng Đình Lộc							Btm 4		3rd Place
Phạm Thị Ngọc Anh				Btm 3	Btm 3	Btm 4	Btm 4		4th Place
Đoàn Minh Trường					Btm 3			Elim	
Đoàn Vũ Minh Tú		Btm 3	Btm 3	Btm 3				Elim	
Nguyễn Vũ Hoàng Minh				Btm 3			Elim		
Nguyễn Lan Anh				Btm 3			Elim		
Hoàng Thái Sơn			Btm 3			Elim			
Phạm Gia Hân					Btm 3	Elim			
Thái Ngọc Tuấn				Btm 3	Elim				
Tăng Phi Phụng					Elim				
Dương Đình Hải		Btm 3	Btm 3	Elim					
Nguyễn Ngọc Tiên			Btm 3	DSQ^{2}					
Phạm Thế Chung	Btm 3	Btm 3	Elim						
Trần Ngọc Thùy Vân	Btm 3	Btm 3	Elim	—N/a^{2}					
Hoàng Chí Thanh	Btm 3	Elim							
Triệu Hồng Vân	Btm 3	Elim							
Phạm Bảo Long	Elim								
Nguyễn Thị Mỹ Linh	Elim	-							

^1 Due to the national funeral honor for General Giáp, the show skipped one week of broadcasting and came back as usual on October 19 for the performance show and on October 20 for the results show.
^2 Ngọc Tiên was forced to leave for good after discovering pregnancy. Thuỳ Vân was brought back immediately to support Thái Sơn, Tiên's partner. Voting line is open merely for Thái Sơn and only one male is evicted that week, instead of a couple.

== Syndication ==
No.	Air date	Title	Notes
01	August 17, 2013	Audition 1	
02	August 24, 2013	Audition 2	
03	August 31, 2013	Audition 3	
04	September 7, 2013	Semifinal Round 1	
05	September 14, 2013	Semifinal Round 2	
06	September 21, 2013	Top 20 Showcase	
07	September 28, 2013	Top 20 Performs	
08	September 29, 2013	Top 20>18 Results Show	
09	October 5, 2013	Top 18 Performs	
10	October 6, 2013	Top 18>16 Results Show	
11	October 19, 2013	Top 16 Performs	Originally planned for air on Oct. 12
12	October 20, 2013	Top 16>14 Results Show	Originally planned for air on Oct. 13
13	October 26, 2013	Top 13 Performs	Ngọc Tiên left for pregnancy. Thuỳ Vân came back, supporting only.
14	October 27, 2013	Top 13>12 Results Show	Only one male out
15	November 2, 2013	Top 12 Performs	
16	November 3, 2013	Top 12>10 Results Show	
17	November 9, 2013	Top 10 Performs	
18	November 10, 2013	Top 10>08 Results Show	
19	November 16, 2013	Top 08 Performs	
20	November 17, 2013	Top 08>06 Results Show	
21	November 23, 2013	Top 06 Performs	
22	November 24, 2013	Top 06>04 Results Show	
23	November 30, 2013	Top 04 Performs	
24	December 1, 2013	Journey to Be Top 4	
25	December 7, 2013	Grand Finale	
26	December 14, 2013	Best of Season 2	
