= CJAM-FM =

Radio station at the University of Windsor

- Windsor, Ontario; Canada
- Frequency: 99.1 MHz
- Branding: CJAM 99.1 FM

Programming
- Format: Campus radio

Ownership
- Owner: University of Windsor

History
- Founded: July 24, 1974
- First air date: November 14, 1983

Technical information
- Licensing authority: CRTC
- Class: A
- ERP: 2,084 watts
- HAAT: 51 metres (167 ft)
- Transmitter coordinates: 42°18′17″N 83°04′03″W

Links
- Webcast: Listen live
- Website: cjam.ca

CJAM-FM (99.1 FM) is a noncommercial educational radio station licensed to Windsor, Ontario, Canada. Owned by the University of Windsor, it carries a campus radio format with studios and transmitter located on the university's campus.

CJAM is an active member of the National Campus and Community Radio Association, and hosted the 2008 National Campus and Community Radio Conference.

== History ==
CJAM's last logo as 91.5, used until the frequency switch in October 2009.

The station was launched on November 14, 1983 on its former frequency of 91.5 MHz, at a power of 50 watts. It had previously operated only on carrier current, with an effective radiated power of just 20 watts, on the AM band at 660 kHz. While Trillium Cable was the main cable provider for Windsor and area (until 1995), it was carried on their cable services on 91.9 FM. In 1995, the station was granted permission to increase power to 456 watts on average (914 watts maximum). In the summer of 1996 a new tower, antenna, and transmitter was installed to facilitate this power increase. Antenna height was 49.4 metres.

The current listening area for the station is to Forest Glade, on the east side of Windsor, while with a car stereo, it can be heard as far as Tilbury, adequately covering all of Essex County, as well as Detroit and the Metro Detroit area's inner suburbs.

In addition to being a campus radio station, CJAM-FM airs multicultural programming, with one-hour blocks for Arabic, Lebanese, Spanish, African, Ukrainian, Slovak, and Croatian cultural programs, along with a feminist and women's rights program.

Corky and the Juice Pigs got their start on CJAM, as did legendary Toronto Maple Leafs broadcaster Joe Bowen.

=== Frequency change ===
On February 2, 2009, the station applied to the CRTC to change its authorized frequency from 91.5 MHz to 99.1 MHz. The desire to switch channels is due to various factors, such as interference to WUOM-FM 91.7 in Ann Arbor, Michigan; and a new Smile FM station on 91.5, licensed to China Township, Michigan, in southern St. Clair County. The application was approved by the CRTC on March 26, 2009. Unlike previously when the station was required to use a directional antenna to broadcast at 91.5 FM, the new frequency of 99.1 FM allows for a full omnidirectional antenna providing better coverage for the Michigan area.

The evening of October 5, 2009, was the final night of CJAM broadcasting at 91.5 FM. The station celebrated its final four hours with a live broadcast from Phog Lounge in Windsor, Ontario. The final song aired by CJAM at 91.5 FM was "Ghost Town" by The Specials. This brought CJAM on 91.5 FM full circle as this was the first song played when the station went to the FM dial in 1983.

On October 7, 2009, at 2:15 PM CJAM resumed broadcasting at its new frequency of 99.1 FM. The first song aired at 99.1 FM was "Siren Radio" by Windsor band What Seas, What Shores. In the spring of 2014 the CRTC approved a request by CJAM to increase its power to 2,084 watts.
