= Weird Canada =

Blog celebrating Canadian emerging music, literature, space, ideas and art

Weird Canada is a blog that celebrates Canadian emerging music, literature, spaces, ideas, and art. It was founded in 2009 by Aaron Levin and Marie LeBlanc-Flanagan in Edmonton, Alberta.

== Background ==
In 2011, Weird Canada won CBC Radio 3's Searchlight competition for Best Canadian Music Website. As of 2012, the blog is completely bilingual in English and French.

In 2011 and 2012, Levin was a judge on the Polaris Music Prize panel.

In 2012, LeBlanc-Flanagan incorporated Wyrd Arts Initiatives, a national nonprofit with a mandate to "encourage, document and connect creative expression across Canada" with a focus on emerging and DIY arts communities. The organization presents music showcases both independently and in partnership with festivals and other organizations, creates resources for the independent and emerging arts community, and continues to publish the Weird Canada web site. LeBlanc-Flanagan has been the Executive Director of Wyrd Arts Initiatives since its inception. The organization is supported by over 450 volunteers (from Victoria to Nunavut) and continues to spark dialogue and change relating to accessibility, inclusivity, organizational openness, and responsive community building.

Canadian indie musicians Grimes, Mac DeMarco and Sean Nicholas Savage got their first exposure through Weird Canada.

== Wyrd Distro ==
A $50,000 grant from FACTOR went into the creation of Wyrd Distro in 2014. The Wyrd Distro is a nationwide music distribution service that allows music fans to buy physical releases from the bands that are featured on Weird Canada's blog.
