= Shani Gandhi =

Australian record producer, engineer and mixer

Shani Gandhi is an Australian music producer, engineer and mixer based in Nashville, Tennessee. A native of Perth, she moved to Ithaca, New York in 2007, to pursue a Bachelor of Music degree at Ithaca College. Her career in Nashville has paired her with such producers as Gary Paczosa, Michael Wagener, Neal Cappellino, and Marshall Altman. Gandhi has engineered and mixed albums for the likes of Alison Krauss & Union Station, George Jones and The Smoky Mountain Boys, Kelsea Ballerini, Sarah Jarosz, Parker Millsap and Sierra Hull.

Gandhi mixed three songs on Kelsea Ballerini's Platinum Certified album The First Time (2015), including its third single Peter Pan, which also received platinum certification and topped the Billboard US Country Airplay and US Hot Country Songs Charts in the same week.

In 2017, Gandhi received a Grammy Award for Best Folk Album as Engineer for Sarah Jarosz's, Undercurrent. She was also nominated for Grammy Award for Best Engineered Album, Non-Classical, along with Gary Paczosa, for the same album.

In 2020, Gandhi was nominated for the 63rd Grammy Awards for Best Engineered Album, Non-Classical as Engineer for Sierra Hull's 25 Trips.

== Discography ==
Year	Artist	Album/Release	Credit
2020	Sierra Hull	25 Trips	Producer, Engineer, Mixer
2016	Sarah Jarosz	Undercurrent	Engineer
2019	The Mountain Goats	In League With Dragons	Mixer
2019	Pony Bradshaw	Sudden Opera	Producer, Engineer, Mixer
2019	Michaela Anne	Desert Dove	Mixer
2018	Parker Millsap	Other Arrangements	Producer, Engineer, Mixer
2019	Danny Burns	North Country	Engineer, Mixer
2017	Old Crow Medicine Show	Cover Stories "My Song"	Engineer
2018	Dierks Bentley	The Mountain	Engineer
2017	Alison Krauss	Windy City	Engineer Assistant
2015	The Lonesome Trio	The Lonesome Trio	Engineer
