= Long Time Coming (Sierra Ferrell album) =

Studio album by Sierra Ferrell
- Released: August 20, 2021
- Studios: Minutia Studios, Nashville, Tennessee, U.S.; Southern Ground Studios, Nashville, Tennessee, U.S.
- Genres: Americana; bluegrass
- Length: 40:29
- Label: Rounder
- Producers: Stu Hibberd; Gary Paczosa

Sierra Ferrell chronology
Washington by the Sea (2019)	Long Time Coming (2021)	Trail of Flowers (2024)

Long Time Coming is the third studio album by American singer-songwriter Sierra Ferrell, released by Rounder Records in 2021. The album has received positive reviews from critics.

== Reception ==
Professional ratings
Aggregate scores
Source	Rating
Metacritic	78/100
Review scores
Source	Rating
Paste	7.6/10
Pitchfork	7.6/10
PopMatters	7/10

According to the review aggregator Metacritic, Long Time Coming received "generally favorable reviews" based on a weighted average score of 78 out of 100 from 4 critic scores. In Glide Magazine, Jim Hynes praised the mix of genres on Long Time Coming, stating that "Ferrell’s unique approach and broad sonic palette will have this album garnering plenty of attention" and predicted that it would be on "several year’s end best lists". In Paste, Andy Crump scored this release a 7.6 out of 10, stating that it "weaves a melancholic kind of magic with that mythological invocation" that "feels refreshingly forward". Editors at Pitchfork scored this release 7.6 out of 10 and critic Brad Sanders praised the vocals, which retain the "wildness" of Ferrell's two independently released albums, alongside the professionalism of her backing musicians, ending his review stating, "for someone whose career started in railroad cars and alleyways, the luxuries of a Nashville studio sound great on her". At PopMatters, Chris Conaton scored this release a 7 out of 10, writing that Ferrell's "voice has a lot of body to it and just enough of a twang to make it easy for her to sell this variety of classic styles she’s trying out" and her songwriting "shows a lot of ability to shift through these different genres".

== Track listing ==
All tracks are written by Sierra Ferrell, unless specified.

No.	Title	Writer(s)	Length
1.	"The Sea"		3:33
2.	"Jeremiah"		3:04
3.	"Bells of Every Chapel" (featuring Billy Strings)	Ferrell; Oliver Bates Craven	4:15
4.	"At The End of the Rainbow"	Ferrell; Nate Leath	3:40
5.	"West Virginia Waltz"	Ferrell; Leath	3:34
6.	"Silver Dollar"	Ferrell; Leath	2:06
7.	"Far Away Across the Sea"		3:18
8.	"Why’d Ya Do It"		3:38
9.	"Give It Time"		3:38
10.	"In Dreams"		2:42
11.	"Made Like That"		3:41
12.	"Whispering Waltz"	Ferrell; Craven	3:22
Total length:			40:29

== Personnel ==
The album liner notes do not elaborate on who played what on which tracks. The following is adapted from AllMusic and Glide Magazine:

Musicians

- Sierra Ferrell – lead vocals, musical saw on "The Sea", toy piano on “The Sea”, electric guitar on "Far Away Across the Sea”
- Roy Agee – trombone on “At the End of the Rainbow”
- Evan Cobb – clarinet on “At the End of the Rainbow”
- Billy Contreras – fiddle on “Whispering Waltz”
- Dennis Crouch – double bass on “Why’d Ya Do It”
- Jerry Douglas – dobro on “West Virginia Waltz”, lap steel guitar on “West Virginia Waltz”, Weissenborn on “Whispering Waltz”
- Stu Hibberd – electric guitar on “Why’d Ya Do It”, drums on “Why’d Ya Do It”, audio engineering, production
- Rory Hoffman – acoustic guitar on “At the End of the Rainbow”, nylon string guitar on "Far Away Across the Sea”, accordion on “Why’d Ya Do It”, archtop guitar on “Why’d Ya Do It”
- Jedd Hughes – guitars on “In Dreams”, baritone guitar on “Whispering Waltz”
- Sarah Jarosz – backing vocals on “Jeremiah” and “In Dreams”
- Nate Leath – fiddle on “The Sea”, “West Virginia Waltz”, and “Why’d Ya Do It”; mandolin on “West Virginia Waltz” and “Whispering Waltz”
- Julie Lee – instrumentation
- Justin Moses – dobro on “Jeremiah”
- Jess Nolan – backing vocals
- Nadje Noordhuis – trumpet on "Far Away Across the Sea”
- Tim O'Brien – backing vocals on “In Dreams”
- Brett Resnick – steel guitar on “In Dreams”
- Chris Scruggs – steel guitar on "Bells of Every Chapel" and “Give It Time”, console steel guitar on “Why’d Ya Do It”, acoustic guitar on “Whispering Waltz”
- Billy Strings – acoustic guitar on "Bells of Every Chapel"
- Cory Walker – banjo on “Silver Dollar” and “Give It Time”

Engineering

- Gary Paczosa – recording, mixing, production
- Paul Blakemore – audio mastering at CMG Mastering

Artwork

- Alysse Gafkjen – photography
- Florian Mihr – design

== See also ==
- 2021 in American music
- 2021 in country music
- List of 2021 albums
