= Build Me Up from Bones =

Build Me Up From Bones

Studio album by Sarah Jarosz
- Released: 2013
- Studio: Minutia Studios in Nashville, Tennessee
- Genre: Bluegrass, progressive bluegrass, folk
- Length: 44:07
- Language: English
- Label: Sugar Hill Records
- Producer: Gary Paczosa, Sarah Jarosz

Sarah Jarosz chronology
Follow Me Down (2011)	Build Me Up From Bones (2013)	Undercurrent (2016)

Singles from Build Me Up From Bones
- 1. "Over the Edge" Released: 2013

Build Me Up From Bones is the third studio album by American folk and bluegrass singer-songwriter Sarah Jarosz, released on September 24, 2013, on Sugar Hill Records. It was recorded and mixed at Minutia Studios in Nashville, Tennessee, by Gary Paczosa. This is the third studio collaboration between Jarosz and Paczosa. Build Me Up from Bones was nominated for Best Folk Album at the 56th Annual Grammy Awards, and its title track was nominated for Best American Roots Song.

== Track listing ==
No.	Title	Songwriter(s)	Length
1.	"Over the Edge"	Sarah Jarosz, Jedd Hughes	3:18
2.	"Fuel the Fire"	Jarosz	3:34
3.	"Mile on the Moon"	Jarosz, Hughes	3:49
4.	"Build Me Up From Bones"	Jarosz	3:36
5.	"Dark Road"	Jarosz	3:31
6.	"Simple Twist of Fate"	Bob Dylan	4:54
7.	"1,000 Things"	Jarosz, Darrell Scott	3:27
8.	"Gone Too Soon"	Jarosz, Alyssa Bonagura	3:35
9.	"Anything Else"	Jarosz	4:55
10.	"The Book of Right-On"	Joanna Newsom	5:38
11.	"Rearrange the Art"	Jarosz	3:50
Total length:			44:07

== Reception ==
Critic Jon Pareles writing in The New York Times praised the growth demonstrated by Jarosz, saying "with Build Me Up From Bones (Sugar Hill) her third album, she moves past precocity toward the full bloom of artistry: the singing is more deeply self-assured, and the songs are grounded in truer emotional terrain."

Writing in The Boston Globe, music critic James Reed was similarly impressed with the increased complexity of Jarosz's work: "Her latest is more organic, a trio setting that emphasizes the value of space. The songs breathe. From the perspective of composition and structure, the music is more complex and nuanced, too. Jarosz's voice, warm and elastic, rings out strong and clear."

== Personnel ==
- Sarah Jarosz – vocals on all tracks

"Over the Edge"

- Sarah Jarosz – octave mandolin
- Jedd Hughes – harmony vocal, guitar
- Dan Dugmore – lap steel
- Viktor Krauss – bass
- Eric Darken – percussion

"Fuel the Fire"

- Sarah Jarosz – banjo
- Darrell Scott – harmony vocal
- Alex Hargreaves – violin
- Nathaniel Smith – violin
- Chris Thile – mandolin
- Viktor Krauss – bass

"Mile on the Moon"

- Sarah Jarosz – octave mandolin
- Jedd Hughes – harmony vocal, guitar
- Dirk Powell – accordion
- Dan Dugmore – electric guitar
- Viktor Krauss – bass
- Eric Darken – percussion

"Build Me Up From Bones"

- Sarah Jarosz – octave mandolin
- Aoife O'Donovan – harmony vocal
- Alex Hargreaves – violin
- Nathaniel Smith – cello

"Dark Road"

- Sarah Jarosz – guitar
- Kai Welch – harmony vocal
- Jerry Douglas – Dobro
- Darrell Scott – electric guitar
- Viktor Krauss – bass
- Kenny Malone – percussion

"Simple Twist of Fate"

- Nathaniel Smith – cello

"1,000 Things"

- Sarah Jarosz – guitar
- Alex Hargreaves – violin
- Nathaniel Smith – cello
- Kenny Malone – percussion

"Gone Too Soon"

- Sarah Jarosz – octave mandolin
- Kate Rusby – harmony vocal
- Jerry Douglas – Weissenborn
- Darrell Scott – guitar
- Dirk Powell – bass
- Kenny Malone – percussion

"Anything Else"

- Sarah Jarosz – guitar
- Alex Hargreaves – violin
- Nathaniel Smith – cello

"The Book of Right-On"

- Sarah Jarosz – mandolin
- Alex Hargreaves – violin
- Nathaniel Smith – cello

"Rearrange the Art"

- Sarah Jarosz – banjo
- Aoife O'Donovan – harmony vocal
- Alex Hargreaves – violin
- Nathaniel Smith – cello
- Dan Dugmore – pedal steel
- Tim Lauer – Wurlitzer

Production

- Produced by Gary Paczosa and Sarah Jarosz
- Recorded and Mixed by Gary Paczosa at Minutia Studios, Nashville, Tennessee
- Additional engineering: Shani Gandhi and Brandon Bell
- Mastered by Eric Boulanger at The Mastering Lab, Ojai, California
