= Follow Me Down (album) =

Studio album by Sarah Jarosz
- Released: May 17, 2011
- Studios: Minutia; Ocean Way, Nashville; Sear Sound, New York City; The Metal Building; Mix One
- Genres: Bluegrass, progressive bluegrass, folk
- Length: 39:17
- Language: English
- Label: Sugar Hill Records
- Producers: Gary Paczosa, Sarah Jarosz

Sarah Jarosz chronology
Song Up in Her Head (2009)	Follow Me Down (2011)	Build Me Up from Bones (2013)

Professional ratings
Aggregate scores
Source	Rating
Metacritic	80/100
Review scores
Source	Rating
AllMusic	3.5/5 stars
Paste	8.7/10
PopMatters	8/10 stars
Slant	3.5/5 stars
The Telegraph	4/5 stars

Follow Me Down is the second studio album by American folk and bluegrass singer-songwriter Sarah Jarosz, released on May 17, 2011, on Sugar Hill Records. It was recorded and mixed at Minutia Studios and mastered at The Mastering Lab in Nashville, TN, by Gary Paczosa with additional engineering by Brandon Bell. In 2012, the song "Come Around" was nominated for Song of the Year at the Americana Music Honors & Awards.

== Track listing ==
All tracks are written by Sarah Jarosz, except where noted.

No.	Title	Writer(s)	Length
1.	"Run Away"	Jarosz, Alyssa Bonagura	3:21
2.	"Come Around"		3:32
3.	"Annabelle Lee"	Jarosz (music), Cameron Scoggins and Jarosz (lyrics adapted from a poem by Edgar Allan Poe)	3:09
4.	"Ring Them Bells"	Bob Dylan	3:30
5.	"My Muse"		4:35
6.	"Floating in the Balance"		2:53
7.	"Old Smitty" (instrumental)		3:13
8.	"The Tourist" (Radiohead cover)	Colin Charles Greenwood, Edward John O'Brien, Jonathan Richard Guy Greenwood, Philip James Selway, Thomas Edward Yorke	4:51
9.	"Here nor There"		3:46
10.	"Gypsy"		3:06
11.	"Peace" (instrumental)		3:15

== Personnel ==
- Sarah Jarosz – lead vocals, guitar, electric guitar, banjo, Clawhammer banjo, toy piano, octave mandolin, Wurlitzer organ, tenor guitar
- Viktor Krauss – bass (tracks 1, 2, 3, 5, 9 and 10)
- Nathaniel Smith – cello (tracks 1, 2, 3, 5, 7)
- Shannon Forrest – drums (tracks 1, 2, 3 and 9)
- John Leventhal – electric guitar (track 1)
- Shawn Colvin – harmony vocals (track 1)
- Alex Hargreaves – violin (tracks 1, 5 and 7)
- Béla Fleck – banjo (track 2)
- Darrell Scott – harmony vocals (tracks 2 and 9)
- Casey Driessen – violin (track 2)
- Dan Tyminski – harmony vocals (track 3)
- Jerry Douglas – Lap steel guitar (track 3), Weissenborn slide guitar (tracks 4 and 10), dobro (tracks 6, 7, 9 and 10)
- Stuart Douglas – violin (track 3)
- Mark Schatz – bass (tracks 4, 6 and 7)
- Vince Gill – harmony vocals (track 4)
- Sarah Siskind – harmony vocals (tracks 5 and 6)
- Stuart Duncan – violin (tracks 4, 6 and 11), viola, gut string banjo (track 4)
- Noam Pikelny – banjo (track 8)
- Paul Kowert – bass (track 8)
- Punch Brothers – ensemble (track 8)
- Chris Eldridge – guitar (track 8)
- Chris Thile – mandolin (track 8)
- Gabe Witcher – violin (track 8)
- Jenny Conlee-Drizos – accordion (track 10)
- Edgar Meyer – bass (track 11)
- Seamus Egan – wooden flute (track 11)
