= 2024 Americana Music Honors & Awards =

Americana Music Honors & Awards

- Date: September 18, 2024
- Location: Ryman Auditorium; Nashville, Tennessee
- Hosted by: The Milk Carton Kids

Highlights
- Most awards: Sierra Ferrell (2)
- Most nominations: Tyler Childers and Sierra Ferrell (3)
- Website: americanamusic.org/awards

Television/radio coverage
- Network: Circle, PBS,

The 2024 Americana Music Honors & Awards ceremony was held on Wednesday, September 18, 2024, at the Ryman Auditorium in Nashville, Tennessee. The marquee event for the Americana Music Association and the centerpiece of their annual Americanafest, artists are awarded for outstanding achievements in the music industry and the americana genre. The show is set to be live-streamed on the Circle YouTube channel and on the AMA's Facebook page, alongside live radio broadcasts on SiriusXM and local Tennessee stations WSM, WMOT and WRLT. An hour-long special of highlights will on PBS in November as part of Austin City Limits.

Tyler Childers and Sierra Ferrell led the nominations, with three each.

== Performers ==
All performers were backed by the All-Star Americana House Band led by Buddy Miller (guitar) and featuring Jerry Pentecost (drums), Don Was (bass), Jim Hoke (pedal steel/banjo), Bryan Owens (percussion), Larry Campbell (fiddle/mandolin/guitar), Jen Gunderman (piano/accordion) and The McCrary Sisters (vocals).

Artist(s)	Song(s)
Duane Betts	Tribute to Dickey Betts "Blue Sky"
Kaitlin Butts	"You Ain't Gotta Die (To be Dead to Me)"
The Blind Boys of Alabama	"Work Until My Days Are Done"
Waxahatchee MJ Lenderman	"Right Back to It"
Charles Wesley Godwin	"All Again"
Dave Alvin Jimmie Dale Gilmore	"4th of July"
Jobi Riccio	"For Me It's You"
Wyatt Flores	"Welcome to the Plains"
Fantastic Negrito	Tribute to Reverend Gary Davis "Samson and Delilah"
The Milk Carton Kids	"When You're Gone"
Larkin Poe	"Bluephoria"
Turnpike Troubadours	"Mean Old Sun"
The War and Treaty	"I'll Come Running"
Sarah Jarosz	"Jealous Moon"
Brandy Clark SistaStrings	"Take Mine"
Sierra Ferrell	"American Dreaming"
Shelby Lynne Allison Moorer	"Gotta Get Back"
Hurray for the Riff Raff	"Buffalo"
Noah Kahan	"Dial Drunk"
Dwight Yoakam Jim Lauderdale	"Fast as You"
Emmylou Harris Rodney Crowell	"Return of the Grievous Angel"

== Winners and nominees ==
The eligibility period for the 23rd Americana Music Honors & Awards is April 1, 2023 to March 31, 2024. The nominees were announced by Gina Miller on May 7, 2023, at a ceremony at the National Museum of African American Music in Nashville which featured performances from SistaStrings, Sierra Ferrell, Kaitlin Butts, Megan McCormick with Amanda Fields and Ethan Ballinger, and The War and Treaty.

Artist of the Year	Album of the Year
Sierra Ferrell; Tyler Childers; Charley Crockett; Noah Kahan; Allison Russell	Trail of Flowers - Sierra Ferrell; Brandy Clark - Brandy Clark; The Past Is Still Alive - Hurray for the Riff Raff; Rustin' in the Rain - Tyler Childers; Weathervanes - Jason Isbell and the 400 Unit
Song of the Year	Emerging Act of the Year
"Dear Insecurity" - Brandy Clark and Michael Pollack; "American Dreaming" - Sierra Ferrell and Melody Walker; "In Your Love" - Tyler Childers and Geno Seale; "Jealous Moon" - Sarah Jarosz and Daniel Tashian; "Right Back to It" - Katie Crutchfield	The Red Clay Strays; Kaitlin Butts; Wyatt Flores; Charles Wesley Godwin; Jobi Riccio
Duo/Group of the Year	Instrumentalist of the Year
Larkin Poe; Black Pumas; The Milk Carton Kids; Turnpike Troubadours; The War and Treaty	Grace Bowers; Maddie Denton; Jamie Dick; Megan McCormick; Joshua Rilko

== Honors ==
The Lifetime Achievement honorees were announced on June 24, 2024.

=== Americana Trailblazer Award ===
- Shelby Lynne

=== Legacy of Americana Award ===
- Reverend Gary Davis

=== Lifetime Achievement Award for Performance ===
- The Blind Boys of Alabama
- Dwight Yoakam

=== Lifetime Achievement Award for Songwriter ===
- Dave Alvin

=== Lifetime Achievement Award for Producer ===
- Don Was

== Presenters ==
- Amy Helm and Amythyst Kiah - presented Instrumentalist of the Year
- Susan Tedeschi - presented Lifetime Achievement Award to The Blind Boys of Alabama
- Ann Powers - introduced Waxahatchee
- Warren Zanes - introduced Charles Wesley Godwin
- Jimmie Dale Gilmore - presented the Americana Trailblazer Award
- Elizabeth Cook - tribute to Jeremy Tepper and Mojo Nixon, and introduced Wyatt Flores
- Noelle Taylor and Shannon Sanders - presented Legacy of Americana Award
- Joe Henry - introduced The Milk Carton Kids and T Bone Burnett
- T Bone Burnett - introduced Larkin Poe
- MC Taylor and Gaby Moreno - presented Emerging Artist of the Year
- Shane Smith and Bennett Brown - introduced Turnpike Troubadours
- Martina McBride - presented Lifetime Achievement Award to Don Was
- Jed Hilly - introduced The War and Treaty
- Michael Grimes - introduced Sarah Jarosz
- The Lone Bellow - presented Duo/Group of the Year and introduced Brandy Clark
- The Milk Carton Kids - introduced Sierra Ferrell and Noah Kahan
- Allison Moorer - presented the Lifetime Achievement Award to Shelby Lynne
- Iron & Wine and Silvana Estrada - presented Song of the Year and introduced Hurray for the Riff Raff
- Lukas Nelson - presented Album of the Year
- Brandy Clark - presented the Lifetime Achievement Award to Dwight Yoakam
- Nathaniel Rateliff - presented Artist of the Year
- Margo Price - introduced Emmylou Harris and Rodney Crowell
