= Undercurrent (Sarah Jarosz album) =

Studio album by Sarah Jarosz
- Released: June 17, 2016
- Genre: Folk, Americana
- Length: 36:43
- Label: Sugar Hill Records

Sarah Jarosz chronology
Build Me Up from Bones (2013)	Undercurrent (2016)	World on the Ground (2020)

Undercurrent is the fourth studio album by American singer–songwriter Sarah Jarosz. The album was released in 2016 by Sugar Hill Records. The album and one song were nominated for three Grammy Awards, winning two.

== Critical reception ==
Professional ratings
Review scores
Source	Rating
AllMusic	3.5/5 stars

Thom Jurek of AllMusic writes that "Jarosz reaches through her musical and personal histories with vulnerability and willingness. She comes out on the other side with songs that possess narrative savvy, melodic invention, and a refreshing sense of self-assuredness". Jim Fusilli of the Wall Street Journal finds her "country–flavored folk songs" to be "direct, unadorned and thoroughly beautiful".

=== Accolades ===
In 2016 the album won the Grammy for Best Folk Album and was nominated for Best Engineered Album, Non-Classical. The song "House of Mercy" received the Grammy for Best American Roots Performance at the 59th Annual Grammy Awards.

== Track listing ==
No.	Title	Writer(s)	Length
1.	"Early Morning Light"	Sarah Jarosz	2:36
2.	"Green Lights"	Jarosz, Luke Reynolds	3:35
3.	"House of Mercy"	Jedd Hughes, Jarosz	4:38
4.	"Everything to Hide"	Jarosz	3:24
5.	"Back of My Mind"	Jarosz, Joey Ryan	3:38
6.	"Comin' Undone" (featuring Parker Millsap)	Jarosz, Parker Millsap	3:01
7.	"Take Another Turn"	Jarosz	2:34
8.	"Lost Dog"	Sarah Buxton, Hughes, Jarosz	3:39
9.	"Take Me Back"	Jarosz, Ryan	2:34
10.	"Still Life"	Jarosz, Aoife O'Donovan	2:54
11.	"Jacqueline"	Jarosz	3:50
Total length:			36:43

== Personnel ==
- Sarah Jarosz – vocals, acoustic and electric guitars, octave mandolin, banjo
- Luke Reynolds – acoustic and electric guitars, pedal steel, vocals
- Jedd Hughes – acoustic and electric guitars, vocals
- Mark Schatz – bass guitar

=== Additional musicians ===
- Parker Millsap – acoustic guitar, vocals (track 6)
- Tim Lauer – B3 organ (track 6)
- Aoife O'Donovan – guitar, vocals (track 10)
- Sara Watkins – fiddle (track 10)

=== Technical personnel ===
- Gary Paczosa and Sarah Jarosz – producers
- Gary Paczosa and Shani Gandhi – engineers
- Gary Paczosa – mixing
- Paul Blakemore – mastering

== Charts ==
Chart (2016)	Peak position
US Top Bluegrass Albums (Billboard)	1
US Americana/Folk Albums (Billboard)	6
US Top Rock Albums (Billboard)	14
US Billboard 200	117
