= Song Up in Her Head =

Studio album by Sarah Jarosz
- Released: June 19, 2009
- Recorded: Minutia Studios, The Mastering Lab
- Genres: Bluegrass, progressive bluegrass, folk
- Length: 45:25
- Language: English
- Label: Sugar Hill Records
- Producers: Gary Paczosa, Sarah Jarosz

Sarah Jarosz chronology
Song Up in Her Head (2009)	Follow Me Down (2011)

Professional ratings
Aggregate scores
Source	Rating
Metacritic	79/100
Review scores
Source	Rating
AllMusic	3.5/5 stars
Paste	8.8/10
PopMatters	7/10 stars
Rolling Stone	3/5 stars

Song Up in Her Head is the first studio album by American folk and bluegrass singer-songwriter Sarah Jarosz, released on June 19, 2009, on Sugar Hill Records. It was recorded and mixed at Minutia Studios and The Mastering Lab, respectively, in Nashville, TN, by Gary Paczosa with additional engineering by Brandon Bell, John Netti, Keith Gary, Mike Judeh and Chris Dye. The song "Mansinneedof" was nominated for Best Country Instrumental Performance at the 52nd Annual Grammy Awards.

== Track listing ==
All tracks are written by Sarah Jarosz, except where noted.

No.	Title	Writer(s)	Length
1.	"Song Up in Her Head"	Sarah Jarosz, Jerry Douglas	2:42
2.	"Edge Of A Dream"		3:42
3.	"Tell Me True"		4:08
4.	"Mansinneedof" (instrumental)		2:51
5.	"I Can't Love You Now"		2:33
6.	"Broussard's Lament"		3:35
7.	"Fischer Store Road" (instrumental)		2:17
8.	"Left Home"		3:23
9.	"Shankill Butchers"	Colin Meloy	4:21
10.	"Can't Hide"		3:11
11.	"Long Journey"		5:16
12.	"Come On Up to the House"	Kathleen Brennan, Tom Waits	4:27
13.	"Little Song"		2:48

== Personnel ==
- Sarah Jarosz – lead vocals (all tracks except 4 and 7), octave mandolin (track 1), mandolin (tracks 4 and 12) guitar (tracks 2, 6 and 13), Clawhammer banjo (tracks 3, 5, 7, 8, 10)
- Paul Kowert – bass (tracks 1, 4 and 11)
- Darrell Scott – harmony vocals (tracks 1, 6), National Resonator guitar (track 6)
- Chris Thile – mandolin (tracks 1, 11 and 13), harmony vocals (track 13)
- Kenny Malone – percussion (tracks 1, 6 and 12)
- Jerry Douglas – Weissenborn slide guitar (track 3), Dobro Resonator guitar (tracks 7 and 8)
- Stuart Duncan – fretless banjo (track 2), fiddle (tracks 6, 8 and 10), Waldzither zither (track 2)
- Ben Sollee – cello (tracks 2, 5 and 9)
- Tim Lauer – piano, synthesizer (track 2)
- Mark Schatz – bass (tracks 3, 5, 6 and 10)
- Alex Hargreaves – fiddle (tracks 3, 4, 5, 7 and 12)
- Tim O'Brien – harmony vocals (tracks 3 and 12)
- Mike Marshall – second mandolin (track 4), mandoloncello (track 9), mandolin (track 5)
- Byron House – bass (track 8)
- Chris Eldridge – guitar (track 8)
- Aoife O'Donovan – harmony vocals (track 8)
- Sarah Siskind – harmony vocals (tracks 8 and 11)
- Luke Reynolds – steel guitar (9 and 11), electric octave mandolin (track 11)
- Samson Grisman – bass (tracks 7 and 12)
