= World on the Ground =

Studio album by Sarah Jarosz
- Released: June 5, 2020
- Studio: Studio 22 (New York)
- Genres: Folk; Americana
- Length: 35:30
- Label: Rounder
- Producer: John Leventhal

Sarah Jarosz chronology
Undercurrent (2016)	World on the Ground (2020)	Blue Heron Suite (2021)

World on the Ground is the fifth studio album by American singer–songwriter Sarah Jarosz, released on June 5, 2020 by Rounder Records. Produced by John Leventhal, it was recorded at Studio 22 in New York.

The fourth track on the album, "Johnny", a song with chord progressions reminiscent of the 1991 Nirvana song, "Polly", was performed by Jarosz on the music variety radio program Live from Here on May 30, 2020.

== Critical reception ==
Professional ratings
Aggregate scores
Source	Rating
Metacritic	83/100
Review scores
Source	Rating
AllMusic	4/5 stars
American Songwriter	4/5 stars
MusicOMH	4/5 stars
Paste	7.3/10

On Metacritic, which assigns a weighted average rating to reviews from mainstream publications, World on the Ground received an average score of 83 out of 100, based on 6 reviews, indicating "universal acclaim" from critics.

== Awards and honors ==
At the 2021 Grammy Awards, World on the Ground won for Best Americana Album. The song "Hometown" was nominated for the Grammy Best American Roots Song.

== Track listing ==
World on the Ground track listing
No.	Title	Writer(s)	Length
1.	"Eve"	Sarah Jarosz	3:26
2.	"Pay It No Mind"	Jarosz; John Leventhal	3:16
3.	"Hometown"	Jarosz	3:00
4.	"Johnny"	Jarosz	3:59
5.	"Orange and Blue"	Jarosz; Leventhal	3:37
6.	"I'll Be Gone"	Jarosz; Leventhal	3:35
7.	"Maggie"	Jarosz	3:29
8.	"What Do I Do"	Jarosz	3:23
9.	"Empty Square"	Jarosz; Leventhal	3:20
10.	"Little Satchel"	Traditional	4:25
Total length:			35:30

== Personnel ==
- Sarah Jarosz – vocals, guitars, mandolin, octave mandolin, bouzouki, clawhammer banjo
- John Leventhal – harmony vocals, guitars, drums, percussion, keyboards, marxophone, autoharp, bass
- Dave Eggar – cello
- Katie Kresek – violin
- Katie Thomas – violin
- Christopher Cardona – viola

Additional musicians

- Shawn Pelton – drums (tracks 6 and 8)
- Catherine Russell, Curtis King, Dennis Collins – harmony vocals (track 6)

Technical

- John Leventhal – producer, mixing, recording
- Mark Goodell – recording
- Gavin Lurssen – mastering

== Charts ==
Chart (2020)	Peak position
Scottish Albums (Official Charts)	88
UK Americana Albums (Official Charts)	3
UK Country Albums (Official Charts)	4
