= Sierra Ferrell =

American singer-songwriter and musician (born 1988)

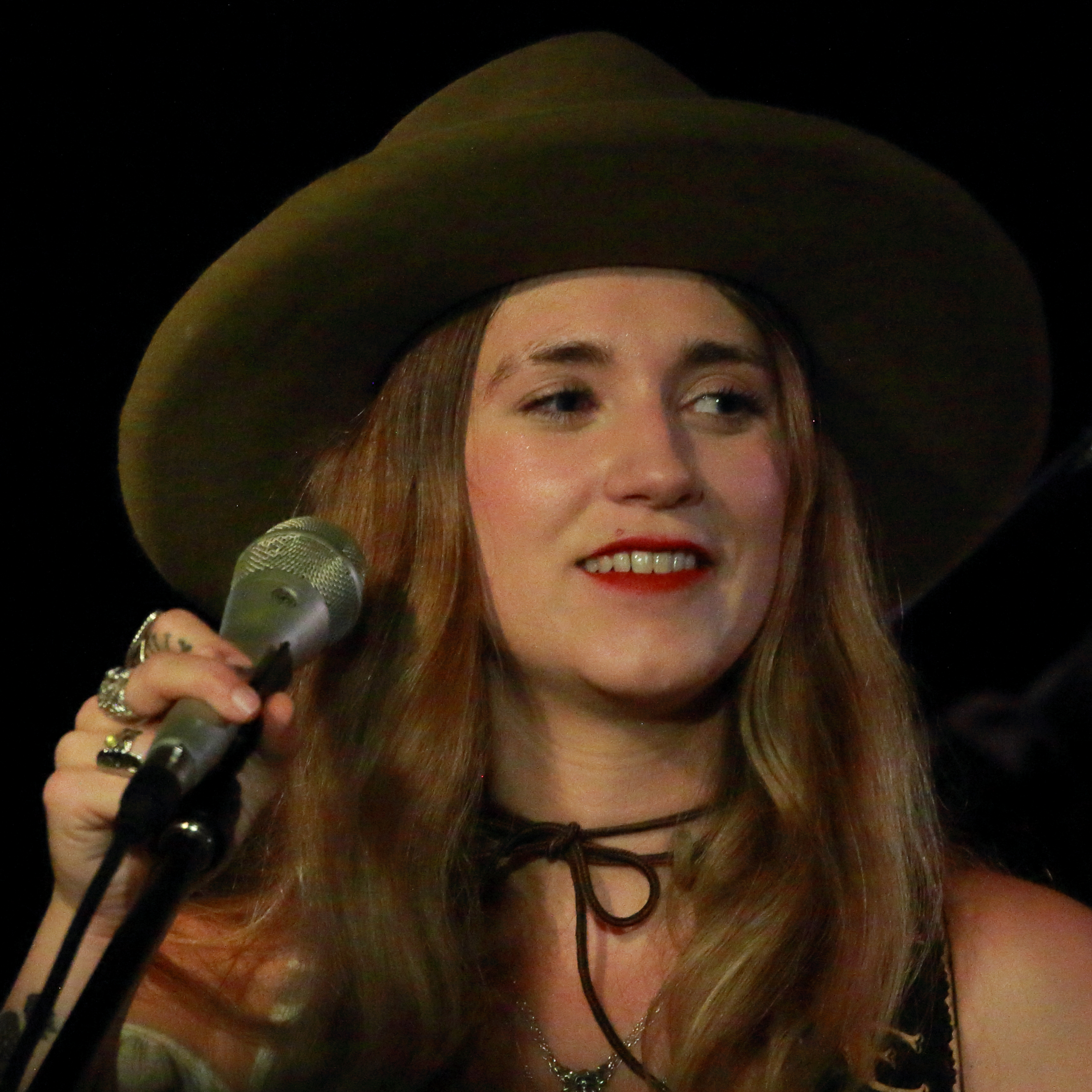
- Ferrell in 2022

Background information
- Born: Sierra Elizabeth Ferrell; August 3, 1988 (age 38); Charleston, West Virginia, U.S.
- Genres: Alternative country; bluegrass; Americana
- Occupations: Singer; songwriter; musician
- Instruments: Vocals; guitar; fiddle
- Label: Rounder
- Website: www.sierraferrellmusic.com

Sierra Elizabeth Ferrell (born August 3, 1988) is an American singer-songwriter and musician from West Virginia. Her music incorporates elements of folk, bluegrass, and gypsy jazz, and styles such as tango and calypso music.

After self-releasing the albums Pretty Magic Spell in 2018 and Washington by the Sea in 2019, she released Long Time Coming in 2021 with Rounder Records, to critical acclaim. Accompanying videos for singles "The Sea", "In Dreams", and "Bells of Every Chapel" (featuring Billy Strings) were uploaded to her YouTube channel in the weeks and months preceding the Long Time Coming's release. Ferrell stayed with the label for her fourth album Trail of Flowers in March 2024, which won her four Grammy Awards.

== Early life ==
Sierra Elizabeth Ferrell was born in Charleston, West Virginia. After her parents divorced when she was around five years old, she lived with her mother and one of her two siblings in a trailer. This led to her spending less time with electronics and more time exploring outside. Despite her home state's deep-rooted history in bluegrass music, Ferrell instead grew up listening to cassette tapes of '90s music that her mother owned, taking interest in such acts as 10,000 Maniacs and Tracy Chapman.

Ferrell's musical journey began in childhood, playing clarinet and singing choir in school, eventually learning to play guitar and performing Shania Twain covers at a local bar. In her teens, she joined 600 lbs of Sin! as the vocalist, who started as a Grateful Dead cover group, but later turned into a blues and roots jam band. She left the band for some time in 2012 to freighthop. Ferrell rejoined in 2013, but after feeling constrained creatively, she departed the band to independently pursue her musical aspirations.

In her early twenties, she adopted a nomadic lifestyle, hitch-hiking, freighthopping, and living in her van, with the majority of her time spent busking between Seattle and New Orleans. By this point, Ferrell had turned her attention towards playing folk music and its various offshoots, with fellow busking group Yes Ma'am making a particular impression on her musical style. It was also during this time that Ferrell experienced drug addiction stemming from her wayfaring lifestyle, claiming to have died "five times" from narcotics overdoses. After these experiences, she decided to get clean and change her lifestyle in favor of improved health and positive relationships.

== Career ==
Ferrell self-released two albums, Pretty Magic Spell in 2018, and Washington by the Sea in 2019, which she sold while busking. In addition to these albums, she posted covers, original material and live performances to her YouTube channel. In 2018, a recording of her song "In Dreams" was recorded and posted by the YouTube channel "GemsOnVHS", attracting millions of views. Around the same time, she was also frequently performing at "Honky Tonk Tuesday's" hosted at Nashville's American Legion Post 82, eventually capturing the attention of Gary Paczosa, a producer known for his collaborations with Alison Krauss and Dolly Parton. With the help of Paczosa, she signed to Rounder Records for a three-album deal in 2019.

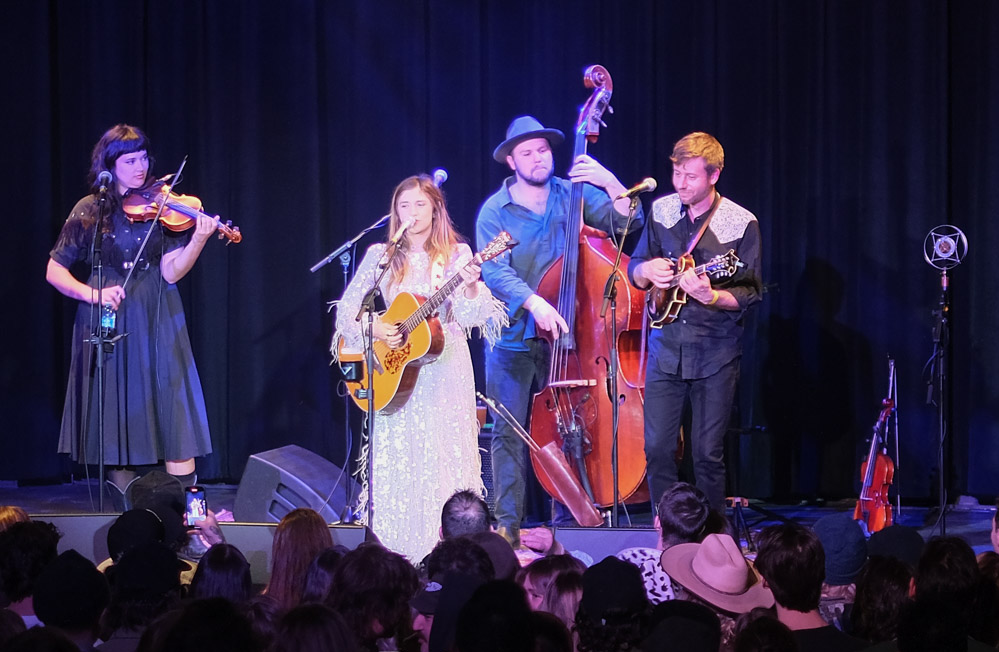
Ferrell performs at the Hollywood Theatre in Vancouver, Canada, March 9, 2022

Following the release of singles "Jeremiah" and "Why'd Ya Do It", Ferrell's album Long Time Coming was released in August 2021. Co-produced by Paczosa and featuring a number of established bluegrass musicians, including Sarah Jarosz and Billy Strings, the album received critical acclaim, reaching number 15 on the Billboard Americana/Folk Albums chart. The album received a five-star review from UK-based publication Country Music People, a rating of 7.6/10 from Paste magazine and 7.6/10 from Pitchfork. Varsity UK said "Long Time Coming will easily be the only album of its type emerging from the music city of Nashville this year", adding that Ferrell "shines brightest when she leans furthest into her own distinctive brand of jazz-inflected bluegrass".

In 2022, she performed backing vocals on The Black Keys album Dropout Boogie. and collaborated with Ray LaMontagne's track "I Was Born to Love You", which landed itself a position on the Billboard Adult Alternative Airplay.

Ferrell collaborated with American country star Zach Bryan on the track "Holy Roller" from his self-titled fourth studio album. The song debuted at number 37 on the Billboard Hot 100. That same year, she collaborated with Shakey Graves on the fourth song from his album, Movie of the Week, titled "Ready or Not". The song, which was recorded in two hours, peaked at 15th on the Billboard Adult Alternative Airplay chart.

On March 22, 2024, Ferrell released her fourth album, Trail of Flowers. In her own words, she aimed to make people "feel nostalgic for the past, but excited about the future of music." Preceded by its singles "Fox Hunt", "Dollar Bill Bar", "I Could Drive You Crazy", and "American Dreaming", the album earned several awards—at the 2024 Americana Music Honors & Awards, Trail of Flowers was awarded "Album of the Year", with Ferrell winning "Artist of the Year". At the 67th Annual Grammy Awards, the album was awarded Best Americana Album, with "American Dreaming" winning Best Americana Performance and Best American Roots Song, and "Lighthouse" winning Best American Roots Performance. Throughout the course of the year, Ferrell featured on tracks with several artists, including "Never Love You Again" with Post Malone, a bluegrass-style cover of Adele's "Someone Like You" with Lukas Nelson (son of Willie Nelson), as well as other collaborations with Hogslop String Band and Colony House.

On February 28, 2026, Ferrell performed with Mumford & Sons on Saturday Night Live.

== Discography ==
=== Albums ===
Title	Details	Peak chart positions		
Title	Details	US	US Country	US Folk
Pretty Magic Spell	Released: November 7, 2018; Label: Opika/Independent; Formats: Digital download, streaming, CD	—	—	—
Washington by the Sea	Released: April 8, 2019; Label: Opika/Independent; Formats: Digital download, streaming, CD	—	—	—
Long Time Coming	Released: August 20, 2021; Label: Rounder; Formats: Digital download, streaming, CD, vinyl	— (Note: Long Time Coming did not enter the Billboard 200, but peaked at number 25 on the Top Album Sales component chart.)	—	15
Trail of Flowers	Released: March 22, 2024; Label: Rounder; Formats: Digital download, streaming, CD, vinyl	106	24	9

=== Singles ===
Title	Year	Album
"Little Bird"	2018	Pretty Magic Spell
"Pretty Magic Spell"	2018	Pretty Magic Spell
"Hold Over Me"	2018	Pretty Magic Spell
"Rosemary"	2018	Washington By The Sea
"Washington By The Sea"	2018	Washington By The Sea
"Jeremiah / "Why'd Ya Do It"	2020	Long Time Coming
"Rockin' Around the Christmas Tree / Jingle Bell Rock"	2020	non-album singles
"Hey Me, Hey Mama"	2022	non-album singles
"In Dreams"	2022	Long Time Coming
"Give It Time"	2022	Long Time Coming
"Years"	2022	non-album singles
"Real Low Down Lonesome"	2022	non-album singles
"Silver Dollar"	2022	Long Time Coming
"The Sea"	2022	Long Time Coming
"Coat of Many Colors"	2023	non-album single
"Fox Hunt"	2023	Trail of Flowers
"I Could Drive You Crazy"	2024	Trail of Flowers
"American Dreaming"	2024	Trail of Flowers
"Dollar Bill Bar"	2024	Trail of Flowers
"The Garden"	2025	Trail of Flowers
"A Lesson in Leavin'" (with Nikki Lane)	2025	non-album single
"When It Snows in Texas"	2025	non-album single
"Trying to Love You"	2026	TBD
"Pair of Dice"	2026	TBD

=== As a featured artist ===
Title	Year	Peak chart positions	Album
Title	Year	US AAA	Album
"Mardi Gras" (Mason Via featuring Sierra Ferrell)	2020	—	Non-album singles
"I Was Born To Love You" (Ray LaMontagne featuring Sierra Ferrell)	2022	38	Non-album singles
"Ready or Not" (Shakey Graves featuring Sierra Ferrell)	2023	15	Movie of the Week
"Tried To Ruin My Name" (Cory Walker featuring Sierra Ferrell)	2023	—	Non-album singles
"Change of Heart" (Margo Price featuring Sierra Ferrell)	2023	—	Non-album singles
"Oldsmobile" (Hogslop String Band featuring Sierra Ferrell)	2024	—	Down the Road
"Someone Like You" (Lukas Nelson featuring The Travelin' McCourys & Sierra Ferrell)	2024	—	Non-album singles
"I'm Not Dyin'" (Colony House featuring Sierra Ferrell)	2024	—	Non-album singles
"Broken Wing Bird'" (Kashus Culpepper featuring Sierra Ferrell)	2025	—	Act I
"A Long Way'" (Ryan Charles featuring Sierra Ferrell)	2025	—	Jiggy Buckaroo
"Unknown Legends" (Lukas Nelson featuring The Travelin' McCourys & Sierra Ferrell)	2025	—	Non-album singles
"When It Snows in Texas'" (Chaparelle featuring Sierra Ferrell)	2025	—	Non-album singles

=== Other charted songs ===
Title	Year	Peak chart positions					Certifications	Album
Title	Year	US	US Country	US Rock	CAN	WW	Certifications	Album
"Holy Roller" (Zach Bryan featuring Sierra Ferrell)	2023	37	17	14	36	85	RIAA: Gold; MC: Platinum	Zach Bryan
"Never Love You Again" (Post Malone featuring Sierra Ferrell)	2024	78	33	—	62	—		F-1 Trillion
"—" denotes a recording that did not chart or was not released in that territory.

== Awards and nominations ==
Ceremony	Year	Category	Recipient(s)	Result	Ref.
Americana Music Honors & Awards	2022	Emerging Artist of the Year	Herself	Won	
Americana Music Honors & Awards	2024	Artist of the Year	Herself	Won	
Americana Music Honors & Awards	2024	Album of the Year	Trail of Flowers	Won	
Grammy Awards	2025	Best Americana Album	Trail of Flowers	Won	
Grammy Awards	2025	Best American Roots Song	"American Dreaming"	Won	
Grammy Awards	2025	Best Americana Performance	"American Dreaming"	Won	
Grammy Awards	2025	Best American Roots Performance	"Lighthouse"	Won	
