= Trail of Flowers =

Studio album by Sierra Ferrell
- Released: March 22, 2024
- Studios: Sound Emporium (Nashville, Tennessee)
- Genres: Americana; bluegrass; old-time
- Length: 37:36
- Label: Rounder
- Producers: Eddie Spear; Gary Paczosa

Sierra Ferrell chronology
Long Time Coming (2021)	Trail of Flowers (2024)

"Seven years or so ago, my pride would get in the way. I just wanted to do it myself. But these days, it's more enjoyable and fun to write with other people."

— Ferrell on collaborating on Trail of Flowers

Trail of Flowers is the fourth studio album by American singer-songwriter Sierra Ferrell, released by Rounder Records on March 22, 2024, and distributed by Concord. The album received positive reviews from critics, who pointed to the blending of genres and time periods, starting with the bluegrass origins of Americana, but also exploring its derivatives.

== Reception ==
Editors at AllMusic rated the album 4 out of 5 stars, with critic Stephen Thomas Erlewine writing that "the record itself can play like an American dream: it's a freewheeling collection of country and folk, rooted in the past and winking at the future while being focused on the moment at hand". BrooklynVegan's Andrew Sacher praised the music for blending nostalgia with contemporary music sounds with "that perfect, enduring mix of a warm, modest, organic exterior, and songwriting that really pops". A profile of Ferrell for The Los Angeles Times by Erin Osmon praised the musician's growth but also noted that "the free spiritedness of her music—an uncommon blend of old-time bluegrass, country, ragtime, folk and jazz, anchored by her powerhouse vocals that by turns recall Patsy Cline, Dolly Parton and Bessie Smith—remains largely the same".

In No Depression, Maeri Ferguson called the album "a full-hearted collection of songs sung straight from the chest". Writing in Paste, Tom Williams scored this release a 7.5 out of 10, stating that it "draws inspiration from jazz, bluegrass and mid-century country, arriving detailed, lived-in and nuanced", with "an obvious charisma to this style of writing". In Spin, Stephen Deusner ranted this release a B+, stating that the music "is best when it stares down disappointment and disillusionment, regardless of whether Ferrell finds a reason to carry on" and that her exploration of American music styles and culture is augmented by "a generation of players steeped in old-time and bluegrass". In The Wall Street Journal, Barry Mazor praised the diverse backgrounds of the musicians and stated that "this collection stands to stick around".

== Track listing ==
All tracks are written by Sierra Ferrell, except where noted.

No.	Title	Writer(s)	Length
1.	"American Dreaming"	Ferrell; Melody Walker	4:17
2.	"Dollar Bill Bar"	Ferrell; Walker	3:29
3.	"Fox Hunt"		3:18
4.	"Chittlin’ Cookin’ Time in Cheatham County" (traditional)		3:02
5.	"Wish You Well"	Ferrell; Walker	3:38
6.	"Money Train"	Ferrell; Chris Scruggs	2:40
7.	"I Could Drive You Crazy"		3:36
8.	"Why Haven’t You Loved Me Yet"		2:15
9.	"Rosemary"		3:36
10.	"Lighthouse"	Ferrell; Lindsay Lou	3:39
11.	"I’ll Come Off the Mountain"		1:45
12.	"No Letter"		2:21
Total length:			37:36

== Personnel ==
"American Dreaming"

- Sierra Ferrell – acoustic guitar, vocals
- Aksel Coe – drums, percussion
- Oliver Bates Craven – gang vocals
- Thorleifur Gaukur Davidsson – steel guitar
- Lukas Nelson – backing vocals
- Joshua Rilko – gang vocals
- Mike Rojas – piano, celesta, vibraphone
- Geoff Saunders – bass guitar, gang vocals
- Seth Taylor – acoustic guitar, electric guitar, banjo
- Melody Walker – backing vocals

"Dollar Bill Bar"

- Sierra Ferrell – vocals

"Fox Hunt"

- Sierra Ferrell – fiddle, vocals
- Aksel Coe – drums
- Billy Contreras – fiddle
- Oliver Bates Craven – gang vocals
- Joshua Rilko – gang vocals
- Mike Rojas – piano
- Geoff Saunders – bass guitar, gang vocals
- Seth Taylor – acoustic guitar, electric guitar, banjo

"Chittlin' Cookin' Time in Cheatham County"

- Sierra Ferrell – vocals

"Wish You Well"

- Sierra Ferrell – vocals
- Aksel Coe – drums, percussion
- Billy Contreras – fiddle, strings, arrangement
- Thorleifur Gaukur Davidsson – steel guitar
- Geoff Saunders – bass guitar
- Seth Taylor – acoustic guitar, electric guitar

"Money Train"

- Sierra Ferrell – vocals
- Aksel Coe – drums
- Lukas Nelson – backing vocals
- Mike Rojas – piano
- Geoff Saunders – bass guitar
- Chris Scruggs – acoustic guitar, hi-strung guitar, lap steel guitar
- Seth Taylor – baritone guitar

"I Could Drive You Crazy"

- Sierra Ferrell – vocals, fiddle
- Aksel Coe – drums
- Billy Contreras – fiddle
- Oliver Bates Craven – backing vocals
- Mike Rojas – piano
- Geoff Saunders – bass guitar, backing vocals
- Seth Taylor – acoustic guitar, electric guitar

"Why Haven't You Loved Me Yet"

- Sierra Ferrell – vocals
- Aksel Coe – drums, percussion
- Oliver Bates Craven – acoustic guitar, backing vocals
- Mike Rojas – vibraphone
- Geoff Saunders – bass guitar, backing vocals
- Chris Scruggs – lap steel guitar
- Seth Taylor – electric guitar
- Melody Walker – backing vocals

"Rosemary"

- Sierra Ferrell – acoustic guitar, vocals
- Aksel Coe – drums, percussion
- Mike Rojas – organ
- Geoff Saunders – bass guitar
- Seth Taylor – electric guitar

"Lighthouse"

- Sierra Ferrell – acoustic guitar
- Oliver Bates Craven – fiddle, harmony vocals
- Joshua Rilko – mandolin, harmony vocals
- Geoff Saunders – bass guitar, harmony vocals

"I'll Come Off the Mountain"

- Sierra Ferrell – vocals
- Aksel Coe – drums
- Billy Contreras – fiddle
- Oliver Bates Craven – backing vocals
- Mike Rojas – piano
- Geoff Saunders – bass guitar
- Chris Scruggs – acoustic guitar
- Melody Walker – backing vocals

"No Letter"

- Sierra Ferrell – vocals
- Oliver Bates Craven – acoustic guitar
- Joshua Rilko – mandolin
- Geoff Saunders – acoustic guitar

Additional personnel

- Paul Blakemore – audio mastering at CMG Mastering
- Nikki Lane – vocal harmonies
- Gary Paczosa – recording on "Lighthouse", mixing on "Lighthouse", additional production, production on "Lighthouse"
- Bobbi Rich – photography
- Eddie Spear – recording, mixing, production

== Chart performance ==
Trail of Flowers reached 106 on the Billboard 200. In the United Kingdom, it placed on several charts, peaking at:

- 3 on Country Artists Albums Chart
- 12 on Americana Chart
- 56 on Album Downloads Chart
- 72 on Album Sales Chart
- 84 on Physical Albums Chart
- 87 on Scottish Albums Chart

== Accolades ==
Trail of Flowers earned several awards—at the 2024 Americana Music Honors & Awards, it won "Album of the Year", with Ferrell winning "Artist of the Year". At the 67th Annual Grammy Awards, the album was awarded Best Americana Album, with "American Dreaming" winning Best Americana Performance and Best American Roots Song, and "Lighthouse" winning Best American Roots Performance.

Year-end lists
Publication	Rank	List
Holler	7	The 25 Best Country Albums of 2024
Rolling Stone	1	The 30 Best Country Albums of 2024

== See also ==
- 2024 in American music
- 2024 in country music
- List of 2024 albums
