= Kelsea Ballerini (EP) =

EP by Kelsea Ballerini
- Released: November 24, 2014
- Length: 16:48
- Label: Black River
- Producer: Forest Glen Whitehead

Kelsea Ballerini chronology
Kelsea Ballerini (2014)	The First Time (2015)

Singles from Kelsea Ballerini
- 1. "Love Me Like You Mean It" Released: July 8, 2014

Kelsea Ballerini is the self-titled debut extended play (EP) by American singer Kelsea Ballerini. It was released on November 24, 2014, by Black River Entertainment. The EP contains five tracks that would later be included on Ballerini's debut full-length album, The First Time, in 2015, including the singles "Love Me Like You Mean It", "Dibs", and "Yeah Boy".

== Background ==
Ballerini first signed a publishing deal with Black River Entertainment in 2010, and later signed a recording contract with the company in December 2013. Her debut single, "Love Me Like You Mean It", was released digitally on July 8, 2014. When it impacted country radio in September 2014, it became the most added debut single by a female artist that year. Three weeks before the release of the EP, Ballerini was named one of the "Next Women of Country" by CMT for her breakthrough success with "Love Me Like You Mean It".

== Commercial performance ==
Kelsea Ballerini debuted and peaked at number 12 on the Billboard Heatseekers Albums chart for the week of December 13, 2014. Following the success of "Love Me Like You Mean It", the EP garnered renewed interest and entered the Top Country Albums chart at its peak position of 40 for the week of March 28, 2015. As of March 2015, the EP has sold 7,400 copies in the US.

== Track listing ==
No.	Title	Writer(s)	Length
1.	"Love Me Like You Mean It"	Kelsea Ballerini; Forest Glen Whitehead; Josh Kerr; Lance Carpenter	3:19
2.	"Yeah Boy"	Ballerini; Whitehead; Keesy Timmer	3:12
3.	"The First Time"	Ballerini	3:59
4.	"Dibs"	Ballerini; Kerr; Ryan Griffin; Jason Duke	3:02
5.	"Looking at Stars"	Ballerini; Whitehead; Scott Stepakoff	3:16
Total length:			16:48

== Charts ==
Chart (2014–15)	Peak position
US Top Country Albums (Billboard)	40
US Heatseekers Albums (Billboard)	12
