= Over the Edge (Sarah Jarosz song) =

Single by Sarah Jarosz

from the album Build Me Up from Bones
- Released: September 24, 2013
- Songwriter(s): Sarah Jarosz, Jedd Hughes

"Over the Edge" is the first single from American bluegrass artist Sarah Jarosz off of her third studio album, Build Me Up from Bones (2013). Written by Sarah Jarosz and Jedd Hughes, the song has received positive critical acclaim, helping Build Me Up from Bones reach number one on the Americana airplay charts in October 2013.

== Personnel ==
- Sarah Jarosz – vocal, octave mandolin
- Jedd Hughes – harmony vocal, guitar
- Dan Dugmore – lap steel
- Viktor Krauss – bass
- Eric Darken – percussion
