= Jedd Hughes =

Australian singer, songwriter, musician and producer

- Born: 31 March 1982 (age 42)
- Origin: Quorn, South Australia, Australia
- Genres: Country, Rock
- Occupation(s): Singer, songwriter
- Instrument(s): Vocals, guitar
- Years active: 2004–present
- Labels: MCA Nashville, Capitol Nashville
- Website: http://www.royalnoiseproductions.com

Jedd Hughes (born in Quorn, Australia) is an Australian singer, songwriter, session musician, and record producer.

== Early life ==
Hughes grew up in Quorn, where he grew up listening to his father's country records. He won a local country music contest at the age of eight and began playing guitar from age nine, taking lessons from his father. He toured Europe when he was 12 and played with various Australian country musicians throughout his teens. After graduating from high school he moved to Levelland, Texas, to study bluegrass at South Plains College. After studying under Terry McBride, (formerly of McBride & the Ride) he dropped out and moved to Nashville, where he worked as a guitarist for Patty Loveless. Eventually he signed with MCA Records, who released his debut album Transcontinental in 2004. He had hits with the singles "High Lonesome" and "Soldier for the Lonely", the latter of which hit No. 60 on the U.S. Billboard Country charts. Hughes and McBride, along with Brett James, also co-wrote Josh Gracin's "Stay with Me (Brass Bed)." Hughes is featured as a duet partner on the track "That's All It Took" from Patty Loveless's 2008 album Sleepless Nights. He is featured on three tracks from Sarah Buxton's self-titled debut album, which was released on 23 February 2010.

== Later Career (2011–present) ==
Hughes was a part of the platinum selling Little Big Town record Tornado where he played guitar and co-wrote "Self Made". He partnered with Sarah Jarosz to co-write on her Grammy Nominated Record Build Me Up from Bones. Songs included "Mile on the Moon" and "Over The Edge". In the spring of 2013, he became lead guitarist of the Emmylou Harris & Rodney Crowell Tour for their Grammy Award Winning Album Old Yellow Moon. Hughes also produced Australian Musician Morgan Evans' latest record. In 2014, Hughes relocated to Los Angeles and started Royal Noise Productions.

== Discography ==
=== Albums ===
| Title | Album details |
|---|---|
| Transcontinental | Release date: 31 August 2004; Label: MCA Nashville |
| West | Release date: August 2019; Label: Carnival Music |

=== Singles ===
| Year | Single | Peak positions | Album |
| Year | Single | US Country | Album |
|---|---|---|---|
| 2004 | "High Lonesome" | 54 | Transcontinental |
| 2005 | "Soldier for the Lonely" | 60 | Transcontinental |

=== Music videos ===
| Year | Video | Director |
|---|---|---|
| 2004 | "High Lonesome" | Brent Hedgecock |

== Awards ==
=== Country Music Awards of Australia ===
The Country Music Awards of Australia (CMAA) (also known as the Golden Guitar Awards) is an annual awards night held in January during the Tamworth Country Music Festival, celebrating recording excellence in the Australian country music industry. They have been held annually since 1973.

| Year | Nominee / work | Award | Result |
|---|---|---|---|
| 2005 | himself | New Talent of the Year | Won |
