= Desert Dove =

Studio album by Michaela Anne
- Released: September 27, 2019
- Genres: Americana; country
- Length: 40:21
- Label: Yep Roc
- Producers: Michaela Anne; Sam Outlaw; Kelly Winrich

Michaela Anne chronology
Bright Lights and the Fame (2016)	Desert Dove (2019)

Singles from Desert Dove
- 1. "By Our Design" Released: June 13, 2019

Desert Dove is the third studio album by American musician Michaela Anne. It was released on September 27, 2019 under Yep Roc Records.

== Singles ==
The first single from the album "By Our Design" on June 13, 2019.

== Critical reception ==
Professional ratings
Aggregate scores
Source	Rating
Metacritic	78/100
Review scores
Source	Rating
AllMusic	3.5/5 stars
American Songwriter	4/5 stars
Paste	8/10

Desert Dove was met with "generally favorable" reviews from critics. At Metacritic, which assigns a weighted average rating out of 100 to reviews from mainstream publications, this release received an average score of 78, based on 4 reviews.

=== Accolades ===
Accolades for
Publication	Accolade	Rank
Albumism	Albumism's Top 50 Albums of 2019	45
Rolling Stone	Rolling Stone's 40 Best Country Albums of 2019	10
Stereogum	Stereogum's 10 Best Country Albums of 2019	9

== Track listing ==
Desert Dove track listing
No.	Title	Music	Length
1.	"By Our Design"	Michaela Anne	3:13
2.	"One Heart"	M. Anne; Jeffrey Michael Malinowski; Sam Outlaw	4:07
3.	"I'm Not the Fire"	M. Anne; S. Outlaw; Jamie Kent	3:05
4.	"Child of the Wind"	M. Anne; S. Outlaw; Felix McTeigue	3:20
5.	"Tattered, Torn and Blue"	M.Anne	3:20
6.	"Desert Dove"	M. Anne	4:42
7.	"Run Away With Me"	M. Anne; S. Outlaw	3:31
8.	"Two Fools"	M. Anne	3:39
9.	"If I Wanted Your Opinion"	M. Anne; Mary Powell Bragg	3:35
10.	"Somebody New"	M. Anne	5:23
11.	"Be Easy"	M. Anne	2:26

== Personnel ==
- Michaela Anne – lead vocals
- Daniel Bailey – drums
- Steve Elliot – guitar
- Wyatt Jansfeld – bass
- Jeremy Long – guitar
- Daniel Rhine – bass
- Mark Stepro – drums
- Brian Whelan – guitar
- Kelly Winrich – engineer
- Alan Silverman – mastering
- Shani Ghandi – mixer

== Charts ==
Chart performance for Desert Dove
Chart (2019)	Peak position
US Heatseekers Albums (Billboard)	35
