= The First Time (Kelsea Ballerini album) =

Studio album by Kelsea Ballerini
- Released: May 19, 2015
- Length: 40:18
- Label: Black River
- Producer: Forest Glen Whitehead

Kelsea Ballerini chronology
Kelsea Ballerini (2014)	The First Time (2015)	Unapologetically (2017)

Singles from The First Time
- 1. "Love Me Like You Mean It" Released: July 8, 2014; 2. "Dibs" Released: July 20, 2015; 3. "Peter Pan" Released: March 21, 2016; 4. "Yeah Boy" Released: October 10, 2016

The First Time is the debut studio album by American singer Kelsea Ballerini. It was released on May 19, 2015, by Black River Entertainment. The album's track listing and cover art were revealed on April 1, 2015. With the album's first three singles all reaching number one on the Billboard Country Airplay chart, Ballerini became the first new female artist to send her first three releases to the top of the charts. A 10-year anniversary edition of the album was released on April 12, 2025.

== Singles ==
"Love Me Like You Mean It", the album's lead single, was released to digital retailers on July 8, 2014, and to country radio on September 22, 2014. The single received good reviews from critics, who praised its pop-country blend production, but criticized its flirty lyrics. The song reached a peak of number five on the US Billboard Hot Country Songs chart and number one on the Country Airplay chart. It is the first song by a solo female to top the country music charts since "Blown Away" in 2012, and makes Ballerini the first female artist to take her debut single to the top spot since Carrie Underwood's first officially-promoted country music single, "Jesus, Take the Wheel", in 2006. The official music video premiered in March 2015, and has over one million views. "Peter Pan" was released as a promotional single on May 5, 2015. "Dibs" was released on July 20, 2015, as the album's second single. It became her second number one hit in March 2016, making her the first solo female country music artist to start her career with back-to-back number one hits since Jamie O'Neal in 2001 with "There Is No Arizona" and "When I Think About Angels".

"Peter Pan" was released as the album's third single in March 2016. She performed the song on the Academy of Country Music Awards with Nick Jonas. The song topped the Billboard Country Airplay and Hot Country Songs charts the same week, making Ballerini the first female artist to accomplish this feat. "Yeah Boy" was announced as the album's fourth and final single on August 26, 2016. It impacted country radio on October 10, 2016.

== Reception ==
Professional ratings
Review scores
Source	Rating
AllMusic	4/5 stars

The First Time was compared to the early works of Taylor Swift in a review by the British publication, Evening Standard, who also described the album as "country with a small c" and stated that due to its "strong melodies" has potential for "appeal across genres." In 2017, Billboard contributor Chuck Dauphin placed seven tracks from the album on his top 10 list of Ballerini's best songs: "Love Me Like You Mean It" at number one, "Peter Pan" at number two, "Looking at Stars" at number five, "Yeah Boy" at number seven, "Dibs" at number eight, the title track at number nine and "Square Pegs" at number ten.

The First Time debuted at number 31 on the Billboard 200 and number four on the Top Country Albums chart with first week sales of 13,500 copies. On the Billboard 200, it left the top 100 the week of August 1, 2015, spending 100 weeks on the chart. The album was certified platinum by the Recording Industry Association of America (RIAA) on December 10, 2020. It has sold 306,700 copies in the US as of October 2017.

== Track listing ==
All tracks are written by Kelsea Ballerini, with additional co-writers as noted.

Standard edition
No.	Title	Writer(s)	Length
1.	"XO"	Catt Gravitt; Gerald O'Brien	2:54
2.	"Peter Pan"	Forest Glen Whitehead; Jesse Lee	3:20
3.	"Love Me Like You Mean It"	Whitehead; Josh Kerr; Lance Carpenter	3:20
4.	"Square Pegs"	Josh Osborne; Scott Stepakoff	3:22
5.	"The First Time"		4:00
6.	"Looking at Stars"	Whitehead; Stepakoff	3:18
7.	"Sirens"	Whitehead; Jennifer Denmark	3:26
8.	"Secondhand Smoke"	Kerr; Jordyn Shellhart	3:43
9.	"Dibs"	Ballerini; Kerr; Ryan Griffin; Jason Duke	3:03
10.	"Stilettos"	Whitehead; Kevin Savigar	3:26
11.	"Yeah Boy"	Whitehead; Keesy Timmer	3:14
12.	"Underage"	Kerr; Stepakoff	3:12
Total length:			40:18

Walmart deluxe edition
No.	Title	Writer(s)	Length
13.	"Yeah Boy" (acoustic version)
14.	"Out of the Blues"	Whitehead	3:56

UK edition
No.	Title	Length
13.	"Love Me Like You Mean It" (acoustic version)	3:02
14.	"Dibs" (acoustic version)	3:09
15.	"Peter Pan" (acoustic version)	3:10
16.	"The First Time" (acoustic version)	3:32
Total length:		53:11

10-year anniversary edition
No.	Title	Writer(s)	Length
13.	"Love Me Like You Mean It" (Reimagined)	Whitehead; Kerr; Carpenter	3:00
14.	"First Time" (Live from the Heartfirst Tour)
15.	"Yeah Boy" (Work Tape)	Whitehead; Timmer
16.	"Peter Pan" (The Demo)	Whitehead; Lee
17.	"Boy Meets Girl"

== Personnel ==
- Adam Ayan – mastering
- Kelsea Ballerini – lead vocals, background vocals
- Kenneth Coca – cello on "The First Time" and "Secondhand Smoke"
- Jennifer Denmark – background vocals on "Sirens"
- Shannon Forrest – drums on "The First Time"
- Shani Gandhi – mixing
- Adam Haynes – fiddle on "Sirens"
- Josh Kerr – swell guitar and background vocals on "Underage"
- Jesse Lee – background vocals on "Peter Pan"
- Jason Massey – banjo, bass guitar, drums, acoustic guitar, electric guitar, mandolin, organ, percussion, piano, producer, programming, slide guitar, tracking, background vocals
- Jonathan Roye – mixing
- Kevin Savigar – piano on "Stilettos"
- F. Reid Shippen – mixing
- Forest Glen Whitehead – banjo, bass guitar, acoustic guitar, electric guitar, mandolin, piano, producer, programming, slide guitar, background vocals

== Charts ==
=== Weekly charts ===
Chart (2015–17)	Peak position
Australian Albums (ARIA)	33
Scottish Albums (OCC)	66
US Billboard 200	31
US Top Country Albums (Billboard)	4
US Independent Albums (Billboard)	4

=== Year end charts ===
Chart (2015)	Position
Top Country Albums (Billboard)	42
Top Independent Albums (Billboard)	27
Chart (2016)	Position
US Billboard 200	117
Top Country Albums (Billboard)	20
Top Independent Albums (Billboard)	8
Chart (2017)	Position
US Billboard 200	186
Top Country Albums (Billboard)	27
Top Independent Albums (Billboard)	10

== Certifications ==
Region	Certification	Certified units/sales
Canada (Music Canada)	Gold	40,000^{‡}
United States (RIAA)	Platinum	1,000,000^{‡}
^{‡} Sales+streaming figures based on certification alone.
