= Dibs (song) =

Single by Kelsea Ballerini

from the album The First Time
- Released: July 20, 2015
- Recorded: 2014
- Genre: Country pop
- Length: 3:03
- Label: Black River
- Songwriters: Kelsea Ballerini; Josh Kerr; Ryan Griffin; Jason Duke
- Producers: Jason Massey; Forest Glen Whitehead

Kelsea Ballerini singles chronology
"Love Me Like You Mean It" (2014)	"Dibs" (2015)	"Peter Pan" (2016)

"Dibs" is a song co-written and recorded by American country pop singer Kelsea Ballerini for her debut studio album The First Time (2015). Ballerini co-wrote the song with Josh Kerr, Ryan Griffin, and Jason Duke. It was released to American country radio by Black River Entertainment on July 20, 2015, as the album's second single. The song was previously included on Ballerini's 2014 self-titled EP.

The song received positive reviews from critics praising Ballerini's youthful enthusiasm throughout the production. "Dibs" peaked at number one on the Billboard Country Airplay chart, giving Ballerini her second number-one country music hit overall. The song was certified Gold by the Recording Industry Association of America (RIAA), and has sold 457,000 copies in the US as of March 2017. It also charted at numbers seven and 58 on both the Hot Country Songs and Hot 100 charts respectively. The song achieved similar chart success in Canada, peaking at number eight on the Country chart and number 96 on the Canadian Hot 100 chart.

The accompanying music video for the song was directed by Robert Chavers and features footage Ballerini took while on tour.

== Reception ==
=== Critical ===
Taste of Country gave the single a positive review, comparing it favorably to previous single "Love Me Like You Mean It" and praising the song's levity. "This airy track is never weighted down with too much emotion," writes the blog, "so even those who can't relate can at least appreciate something fun." John Freeman of Nash Country Weekly wrote Ballerini is Taylor Swift's "pop-country heir apparent," comparing the song to Swift's "Should've Said No" for its playful, sassy, and melodic elements. In 2017, Billboard contributor Chuck Dauphin put "Dibs" at number eight on his top 10 list of Ballerini's best songs.

=== Commercial ===
"Dibs" debuted at number 59 on the Billboard Country Airplay chart for the week of July 18, 2015. It also debuted at number 34 on the Hot Country Songs chart for the week of August 29, 2015 and number 47 on the Canada Country chart for the week of September 12, 2015. It debuted at number 93 on the Billboard Hot 100 for the week of November 11, 2015. It peaked at number 58 the week of February 26, 2016, and remained on the chart for seventeen weeks. The song has sold 457,000 copies in the US as of March 2017. The single debuted at number 96 on the Canadian Hot 100 for the week of February 2, 2016 and dropped to number 98 the next week before leaving the chart completely.

"Dibs" reached number one on the Billboard Country Airplay chart for the week of March 5, 2016, making Ballerini the first solo female country music artist to take her first two career singles to the top of the charts since Jamie O'Neal in 2001 with "There Is No Arizona" and "When I Think About Angels".

== Music video ==
A lyric video for "Dibs" premiered on Ballerini's Vevo channel on February 17, 2015, in promotion of her self-titled EP and then-forthcoming album. It was re-released on July 2, 2015, after the song was selected as the second official single from The First Time. The official music video premiered on October 22, 2015. Directed by Robert Chavers, the video consists of footage Ballerini took herself while on tour in York, Pennsylvania, Greenville, South Carolina and St. Leonard, Maryland, performing in front of live crowds, celebrating her 22nd birthday and spending time with her dog.

== Charts ==
=== Weekly charts ===
Chart (2015–2016)	Peak position
Canada Hot 100 (Billboard)	96
Canada Country (Billboard)	8
US Billboard Hot 100	58
US Country Airplay (Billboard)	1
US Hot Country Songs (Billboard)	7

=== Year-end charts ===
Chart (2015)	Position
US Country Airplay (Billboard)	74
US Hot Country Songs (Billboard)	74

Chart (2016)	Position
US Country Airplay (Billboard)	43
US Hot Country Songs (Billboard)	58

== Certifications ==
Region	Certification	Certified units/sales
Canada (Music Canada)	Gold	40,000^{‡}
United States (RIAA)	Platinum	1,000,000^{‡}
^{‡} Sales+streaming figures based on certification alone.

== See also ==
- List of number-one country singles of 2016 (U.S.)
