= Legends (Kelsea Ballerini song) =

Single by Kelsea Ballerini

from the album Unapologetically
- Released: June 7, 2017
- Genre: Country pop
- Length: 4:03
- Label: Black River
- Songwriter(s): Kelsea Ballerini; Hillary Lindsey; Forest Glen Whitehead
- Producer(s): Forest Glen Whitehead; Jason Massey

Kelsea Ballerini singles chronology
"Yeah Boy" (2016)	"Legends" (2017)	"I Hate Love Songs" (2018)

Music video
- "Legends" on YouTube

"Legends" is a song by American country pop singer Kelsea Ballerini for her second studio album, Unapologetically (2017). Ballerini co-wrote the track with Hillary Lindsey, and Forest Glen Whitehead. The song was released as a digital single on June 7, 2017 and impacted American country radio on July 10, serving as the lead single for the album.

"Legends" reached number one on the Billboard Country Airplay and number 10 on the Hot Country Songs charts, while also reaching number 68 on the all-genre Hot 100 chart. The song also peaked at number three on the Canada Country airplay chart. Ballerini promoted the song with a performance at the 2017 CMT Music Awards and an accompanying music video directed by Jeff Venable that details the development of a relationship that ends in tragedy. Later that year, Ballerini also performed the song at the 2017 CMA Awards with country legend Reba McEntire.

== Content ==
"Legends" is a midtempo country pop ballad with bittersweet lyrics that reflect on a past love. While Ballerini wrote the song "from the perspective of a breakup," she also considers it a message to her fans for their continued support. Critics praised the song's mature songwriting, with Billy Dukes of Taste of Country writing that "Legends" is "a rare country song that looks back on the end of a relationship with a gratitude... that what they had was wonderful, but it needed to end." Musically, the song expands upon the country-pop stylings of Ballerini's debut album with "dramatic" orchestral elements.

== Critical reception ==
Billy Dukes of Taste of Country complimented Ballerini on her maturity and wrote that the song "does something she didn't always do on songs from The First Time," meaning that "it's a complete effort, with everyone in the room committed to a shared vision." Billboard contributor Chuck Dauphin put "Legends" at number three on his top 10 list of Ballerini's best songs.

== Commercial performance ==
"Legends" debuted at number 50 on the Billboard Country Airplay chart for the week of June 24, 2017 as the week's hot shot debut. It peaked at number one for the week of February 24, 2018 earning Ballerini her fourth number one hit on that chart. On the same week, the song also debuted at number 41 on the Hot Country Songs chart and peaked at number ten for the week of February 24, 2018. On the week of December 16, the single debuted at number 98 on the Hot 100 chart before leaving the next week. It reappeared on the chart at number 99 the week of December 31, peaked at number 68 the week of February 24, 2018 and remained on the chart for twelve weeks. On February 26, 2018, "Legends" was certified gold by the Recording Industry Association of America (RIAA) for moving 500,000 units in sales and streams. It has sold 171,000 copies in the US as of March 2018.

== Music video ==
The accompanying music video was directed by Jeff Venable and premiered June 29, 2017. Inspired by the 2016 comedy-drama series, This Is Us, the video shows the progression of a young couple's relationship from meeting through marriage and the birth of their son. In a tragic twist, the father is revealed to have died in a car crash on the child's seventh birthday. At the end of the video, the son is seen in the present day graduating from high school giving his mother the same one-finger wave his father used to. Kelsea's performance scenes were filmed on the cliffs of Big Sur, California.

== Charts ==
Chart (2017–2018)	Peak position
Canada Country (Billboard)	3
US Billboard Hot 100	68
US Country Airplay (Billboard)	1
US Hot Country Songs (Billboard)	10

=== Year-end charts ===
Chart (2017)	Position
US Hot Country Songs (Billboard)	76

Chart (2018)	Position
US Country Airplay (Billboard)	43
US Hot Country Songs (Billboard)	62

== Certifications ==
Region	Certification	Certified units/sales
Canada (Music Canada)	Gold	40,000^{‡}
United States (RIAA)	Gold	500,000^{‡}
^{‡} Sales+streaming figures based on certification alone.

== Release history ==
Country	Date	Format	Label	Ref.
United States	June 7, 2017	Digital download	Black River	
United States	July 10, 2017	Country radio	Black River	
