= Polaroid Lovers =

Studio album by Sarah Jarosz
- Released: January 26, 2024
- Studio: Sound Emporium (Nashville, Tennessee)
- Length: 43:35
- Label: Rounder
- Producer: Daniel Tashian

Sarah Jarosz chronology
Blue Heron Suite (2021)	Polaroid Lovers (2024)

Polaroid Lovers is the seventh studio album by American singer-songwriter Sarah Jarosz. It was released on January 26, 2024, by Rounder Records. The album was produced by Daniel Tashian.

== Background ==
Jarosz began writing the album after she relocated from New York City to Nashville, Tennessee. Jarosz collaborated with songwriters Daniel Tashian, Ruston Kelly, and Natalie Hemby, with Tashian producing the album. Michael Maejor of BroadwayWorld wrote that this writing process "evolved to include a much richer and more electric sound" in the songs.

== Promotion ==
The album's lead single, "Jealous Moon", was released on September 7, 2023, simultaneously with the album's announcement. Of the song, Jarosz said in a press release that the song was "about the times when the parts of ourselves that we try to keep hidden rise to the surface, and we have no choice but to ride the wave", further elaborating that the lyrics were "a moment of self-reflection and a promise to keep showing up even when things get tough" as opposed to an end of a relationship.

The second single, "Columbus & 89th", was released on October 10, 2023. An accompanying music video filmed on the Upper West Side of New York City was released to promote the song. Jarosz later performed the song on CBS Saturday Morning on December 16, 2023.

== Track listing ==
Polaroid Lovers track listing
No.	Title	Writer(s)	Length
1.	"Jealous Moon"	Sarah Jarosz; Daniel Tashian	4:24
2.	"When the Lights Go Out"	Jarosz; Gordie Sampson; Jon Randall	3:15
3.	"Runaway Train"	Jarosz; Randall	3:00
4.	"The Way It Is Now"	Jarosz; Sarah Buxton	3:46
5.	"Dying Ember"	Jarosz; Ruston Kelly	3:37
6.	"Columbus & 89th"	Jarosz; Tashian	4:15
7.	"Take the High Road"	Jarosz; Tashian	4:35
8.	"Don't Break Down on Me"	Jarosz; Randall	3:54
9.	"Days Can Turn Around"	Jarosz; Tashian	3:58
10.	"Good at What I Do"	Jarosz; Natalie Hemby	3:47
11.	"Mezcal and Lime"	Jarosz; Tashian	5:04
Total length:			43:35

Polaroid Lovers deluxe edition bonus tracks
No.	Title	Writer(s)	Length
12.	"Wildflowers in the Sky"	Jarosz; Randall	2:42
13.	"Just Like Paradise"	Jarosz; Tashian	3:43

== Personnel ==
Musicians

- Sarah Jarosz – vocals, octave mandolin, acoustic guitar, electric octave mandolin, mandolin, banjo
- Daniel Tashian – acoustic guitar, 12-string guitar, piano, keyboards, harmony vocals
- Jeff Picker – bass guitar, fretless bass guitar, upright bass
- Fred Eltringham – drums, percussion
- Justin Schipper – pedal steel
- Tom Bukovac – acoustic guitar, electric guitar, rubber bridge guitar (tracks 1–3, 7, 8, 11); organ (1)
- Jon Randall – harmony vocals (tracks 3, 8)
- Rob Mcnelley – acoustic guitar, electric guitar, resonator guitar (tracks 4–6, 9, 10)
- Emmanuel Valdez – acoustic guitar, electric guitar, additional rubber bridge guitar (tracks 6, 8, 9)

Technical

- Daniel Tashian – production
- Paul Blakemore – mastering
- Justin Francis – mixing, engineering
- Gena Johnson – additional engineering
- Louis Remenapp – engineering assistance
- Skyler Chuckry – engineering assistance

Visuals

- Shervin Lainez – photography
- Sage LaMonica – package design

== Charts ==
Chart performance for Polaroid Lovers
Chart (2024)	Peak position
UK Album Downloads (OCC)	45
UK Independent Albums (OCC)	33
