= Blue Heron Suite =

Studio album by Sarah Jarosz
- Released: May 7, 2021
- Recorded: December 2018 (Reservoir Studios, New York City)
- Length: 31:21
- Label: Rounder
- Producer: Sarah Jarosz

Sarah Jarosz chronology
World on the Ground (2020)	Blue Heron Suite (2021)	Polaroid Lovers (2024)

Blue Heron Suite is the sixth studio album by American singer-songwriter Sarah Jarosz. It was released on May 7, 2021, by Rounder Records.

== Background ==
Jarosz began composing songs for the project in 2017 shortly after she became a recipient of the FreshGrass Composition Commission; she subsequently debuted the songs at that year's FreshGrass Festival. The album was recorded throughout December 2018 at the Reservoir Studios in New York City.

== Critical reception ==
Writing for American Songwriter, Lee Zimmerman rated the album four out of five stars and wrote that the collection of songs were "as haunting as they are harrowing, thanks in large part to the delicate designs and the precision that applied in the playing." He concluded his review by writing that the album was "a decidedly mature work that evokes rumination and deliberation in equal measure." Henry Carrigan of Folk Alley positively reviewed the album and wrote that it "captures the feelings of transience that lurk around the edges of our lives and that come into the light in times when we face possible loss."

== Track listing ==
Blue Heron Suite track listing
No.	Title	Length
1.	"Mama"	2:30
2.	"Morning"	3:28
3.	"Across the Canyon"	3:17
4.	"Interlude 1"	3:53
5.	"Painted Blue"	4:21
6.	"Interlude 2"	1:14
7.	"Across the Canyon" (reprise)	2:34
8.	"Interlude 3"	2:10
9.	"Mama" (reprise)	2:31
10.	"Interlude 4"	0:55
11.	"Blue Heron"	4:28
Total length:		31:21

== Personnel ==
Credits for Blue Heron Suite adapted from Tidal.

- Sarah Jarosz - vocals, composer, lyricist, mandolin, guitar, production
- Jefferson Hamer - guitar, background vocals
- Jeff Picker - bass guitar
- Jason Wormer - recording engineering, mixing
- Gavin Lurssen - mastering engineering, studio personnel
