= Peter Pan (Kelsea Ballerini song) =

Single by Kelsea Ballerini

from the album The First Time
- Released: March 21, 2016
- Recorded: 2014
- Genre: Country pop
- Length: 3:20
- Label: Black River
- Songwriters: Kelsea Ballerini; Forest Glen Whitehead; Jesse Lee
- Producers: Forest Glen Whitehead; Jason Massey

Kelsea Ballerini singles chronology
| "Dibs" (2015) | "Peter Pan" (2016) | "Yeah Boy" (2016) |

"Peter Pan" is a song co-written and recorded by American recording artist Kelsea Ballerini. It was released to American country radio by Black River Entertainment as the third single from her debut studio album The First Time (2015). Ballerini co-wrote the song with Forest Glen Whitehead and Jesse Lee. The track is a country pop ballad about a lost love being compared to the song's namesake as a metaphor for being immature and having a tendency to run off to his own fantasy.

"Peter Pan" peaked at number one on both the Billboard Hot Country Songs and Country Airplay charts respectively, becoming Ballerini's first to hit the top of the former, and her third consecutive on the latter chart. It makes her the first female country music artist to top both country music charts at the same time. It also made her the first female country artist since Wynonna Judd in 1992 to send their first three singles to number one. It also charted at number 35 on the Hot 100. The song was certified Double Platinum by the Recording Industry Association of America (RIAA), and has sold 672,000 copies in the US as of March 2017. It achieved similar chart prominence in Canada, peaking at number four on the Canada Country chart and number 75 on the Canadian Hot 100. It garnered a Platinum certification from Music Canada, denoting sales of 80,000 units in that country.

An accompanying music video for the song, directed by Kristin Barlowe, features Ballerini watching in terror as her boyfriend does thrill-seeking stunts in cars, motorcycles, and planes out in the Las Vegas desert. It was nominated for Video of the Year at both the 2017 Academy of Country Music and CMT Music Awards. For promotion, Ballerini first performed the song live with Nick Jonas at the Academy of Country Music Awards and would make later appearances at the 2016 Radio Disney Music Awards with Daya, Live with Kelly and Michael, the Grand Ole Opry, the 59th Annual Grammy Awards with Lukas Graham and CMT Crossroads with Halsey.

== Background and development ==
"Peter Pan" is a country pop song about a lost love, who is compared to the song's namesake as a metaphor for his immaturity and tendency to run away. The ballad has been noted by critics for showcasing a greater emotional depth than Ballerini's previous releases in terms of both lyrical complexity and performance. In a 2019 interview with American Songwriter, co-writer Jesse Lee said that she had the song idea "six months prior" to writing it, jotting down the hook ("You're never gonna grow up, you're never gonna be a man, Peter Pan.") on her phone. Lee told co-producer Forest Glen Whitehead and Kelsea Ballerini about the hook, and they started crafting the song moving forward, writing the first verse in a few minutes and spending a majority on the chorus and the second verse. After finishing the writing process that day, they went on to record the song, with both Lee and Whitehead providing background vocals.

== Reception ==
=== Critical ===
The staff of country music blog Taste of Country praised Ballerini's emotive performance of the song, writing that "the singer either performs the ballad with someone in mind, or she's country music's best actress," and also noted that the song confirms Ballerini's talent as a songwriter. In 2017, Billboard contributor Chuck Dauphin put "Peter Pan" at number two on his top 10 list of Ballerini's best songs.

=== Commercial ===
"Peter Pan" ranked as the most-added song on country radio for the week of March 26, 2016 with 50 Mediabase-monitored stations picking up the song. It resultantly debuted at number 54 on the Billboard Country Airplay chart for the week of April 2 and peaked at number one the week of September 23, making it her third consecutive number one on that chart. A week later, it debuted at number 47 on the Hot Country Songs chart and peaked at number one the week of September 23, making it her first number one on that chart. The achievement made Ballerini the first solo female artist to top both country music charts and also send their first three singles to number one since Wynonna Judd in 1992 with "She Is His Only Need", "I Saw the Light" and "No One Else on Earth". On the Billboard Hot 100, the single debuted at number 92 the week of June 16. Fourteen weeks later, it peaked at number 35 the same week it topped both Country charts, and stayed on the chart for twenty weeks. It was certified platinum by the Recording Industry Association of America (RIAA) on November 21, 2016. The song has sold 672,000 copies in the US as of March 2017.

In Canada, the song debuted at number 46 on the Canada Country chart for the week of June 11, 2016 and peaked at number four the week of September 23, remaining on the chart for twenty weeks. It also debuted at number 92 on the Canadian Hot 100 the week of August 20 and reached number 75 the week of September 23, staying on the chart for ten weeks. It was certified platinum by Music Canada on July 28, 2022.

=== Accolades ===
| Year | Recipient | Awards | Category | Result |
|---|---|---|---|---|
| 2016 | "Peter Pan" | Teen Choice Awards | Choice Country Song | Nominated |
| 2017 | "Peter Pan" | Radio Disney Music Awards | Country Favorite Song | Won |
| 2017 | "Peter Pan" | Academy of Country Music Awards | Video of the Year | Nominated |
| 2017 | "Peter Pan" | CMT Music Awards | Video of the Year | Nominated |
| 2017 | "Peter Pan" | CMT Music Awards | Female Video of the Year | Nominated |

== Music video ==
A lyric video premiered on Ballerini's Vevo account on May 18, 2015. The official music video premiered on Ballerini's Vevo account on April 1, 2016. Directed by Kristin Barlowe, the video takes place in the Las Vegas desert with Ballerini looking on in terror as her boyfriend does thrill-seeking stunts in cars, motorcycles and planes. In the beginning, Ballerini delivers some dialogue about her boyfriend before going straight to the song. She then dons her other dresses while blowing in the wind and in the next shot, she is seen dancing behind a white parachute. Ballerini later confronts her boyfriend after doing a stunt on a plane and at the end of the video, he flies away one last time while Ballerini drives down the road in a car. The on-screen boyfriend is played by American model Nick Davis.

== Live performances ==
On April 3, 2016, Ballerini first performed the song live at the 2016 Academy of Country Music Awards with Nick Jonas on guitar as part of a medley with "Love Me Like You Mean It". Midway through the performance, Jonas botched a guitar solo that he later admitted he screwed up two days later. On May 1, it was performed at the 2016 Radio Disney Music Awards with Daya as a mashup with her song "Hide Away". On May 13, she performed the song on Live with Kelly and Michael. On August 10, it was performed again at the Grand Ole Opry, and after the performance she was given a plaque to celebrate the song being certified Gold. On February 12, 2017, Ballerini performed the song at the 59th Annual Grammy Awards with Lukas Graham as a mashup to their song "7 Years". On March 25, 2020, it was performed on CMT Crossroads as a duet with Halsey.

== Charts ==
=== Weekly charts ===
| Chart (2016) | Peak position |
|---|---|
| Canada Hot 100 (Billboard) | 75 |
| Canada Country (Billboard) | 4 |
| US Billboard Hot 100 | 35 |
| US Country Airplay (Billboard) | 1 |
| US Hot Country Songs (Billboard) | 1 |

=== Year end charts ===
| Chart (2016) | Position |
|---|---|
| US Country Airplay (Billboard) | 13 |
| US Hot Country Songs (Billboard) | 10 |

== Certifications and sales ==
| Region | Certification | Certified units/sales |
|---|---|---|
| Canada (Music Canada) | Platinum | 80,000^{‡} |
| United States (RIAA) | 2× Platinum | 2,000,000^{‡} / 672,000 |
^{‡} Sales+streaming figures based on certification alone.

== Release history ==
| Country | Date | Format | Label | Ref. |
|---|---|---|---|---|
| United States | March 21, 2016 | Country radio | Black River | |

== See also ==
- List of number-one country singles of 2016 (U.S.)
