= Parker Millsap =

American singer-songwriter and musician

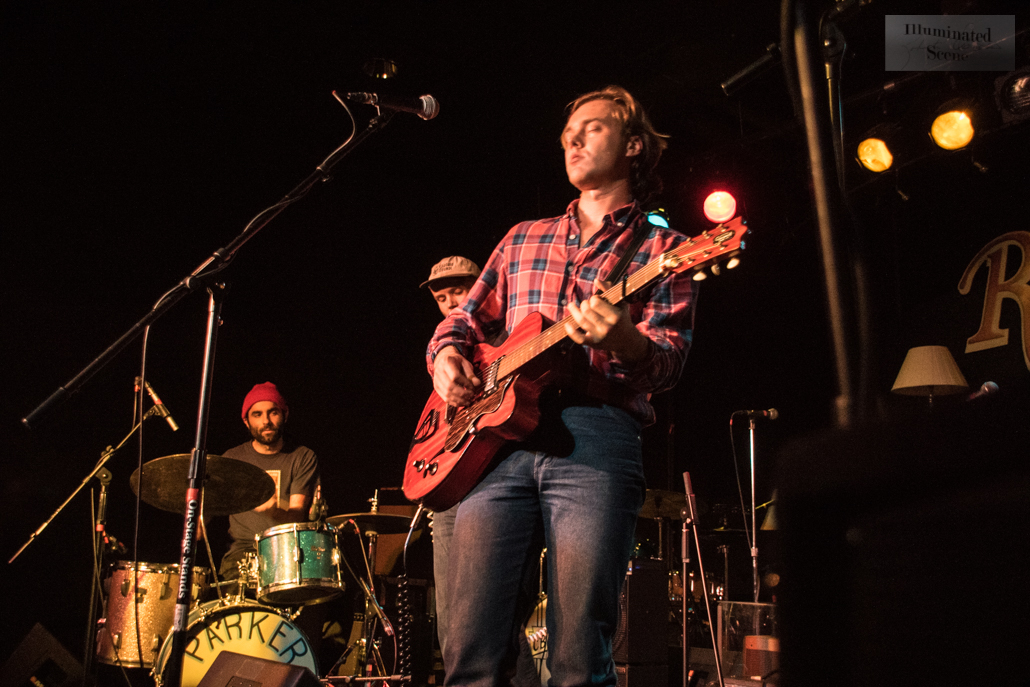

Background information
- Origin: Purcell, Oklahoma, U.S.
- Genres: Americana, roots rock, alt-country, blues, country folk
- Occupation(s): Singer, songwriter, musician
- Instruments: Vocals, guitar, harmonica, piano
- Years active: 2012–present
- Labels: Thirty Tigers, Okrahoma Records
- Website: www.parkermillsap.com

Parker Millsap is an American singer-songwriter and multi-instrumentalist from Purcell, Oklahoma, playing a blend of blues, country, rock, Americana, and folk music. Named one of Americana Music Association's 2014 Emerging Artists of the Year after the release of his eponymous album, Millsap garnered attention with his song "Truck Stop Gospel", which has been featured on NPR's music program The Record. Playing with childhood friend Michael Rose on bass and Daniel Foulks on the fiddle, Millsap's musical style has drawn comparisons to early Elvis Presley. In addition to singing, he plays guitar, harmonica and piano.

He attributes his musical influence to growing up in a Pentecostal Church and listening to blues with his parents.

He has opened for Patty Griffin, Old Crow Medicine Show, Shovels & Rope, Lake Street Dive, John Fullbright, Jason Isbell, and Sarah Jarosz, as well as headlining tours of his own, and counts Elton John as a fan. Millsap's television appearances include Conan and Austin City Limits.

Millsap has released five studio albums. His 2016 release, The Very Last Day, was declared the 11th best roots album of the year by No Depression. His fourth album, Other Arrangements, was released on May 4, 2018. Other Arrangements features a more blues, rock, and pop-focused sound than his previous work. Millsap's fifth album, Be Here Instead was released on April 9, 2021.

== Discography ==
=== Studio albums ===
Title	Album details	Peak chart positions							
Title	Album details	US Americana	Americana Airplay	US Folk	US Rock	Billboard 200	Heatseekers Albums	Independent Albums	Top Album Sales
Palisade	Release date: 18 April 2012; Label: Okrahoma Records	—	—	—	—	—	—	—	—
Parker Millsap	Release date: 4 February 2014; Label: Okrahoma Records	1	—	17	—	95	15	—	—
The Very Last Day	Release date: 25 March 2016; Label: Okrahoma Records	1	1	6	21	49	3	13	80
Other Arrangements	Release date: 4 May 2018; Label: Okrahoma Records	—	—	—	—	—	3	23	100
Be Here Instead	Release date: 9 April 2021; Label: Okrahoma Records	—	—	—	—	—	—	—	—
Wilderness Within You	Release date: 12 May 2023; Label: Okrahoma Records	—	—	—	—	—	—	—	—

=== Other appearances ===
Year	Artist	Album	Song
2016	Sarah Jarosz	Undercurrent	"Comin' Undone" (also co-writer)
2019	Samantha Fish	Kill or Be Kind	"She Don't Live Around Here" (co-writer)

=== Music videos ===
Year	Video	Director
2014	"Truck Stop Gospel"	Matt Bizer/Ted Newsome
2016	"Pining"	Matt Bizer
2019	"Let A Little Light In"	Tim Duggan
2021	"The Real Thing"	Jacqueline Justice
2021	"Vulnerable"	Casey Pierce
2021	"Dammit"	Monica Murray

== Awards and nominations ==
Year	Association	Category	Nominated work	Result
2014	Americana Music Honors & Awards	Emerging Artist of the Year	Himself	Nominated
2016	Americana Music Honors & Awards	Album of the Year	The Very Last Day	Nominated
