= Sam Outlaw =

American singer-songwriter

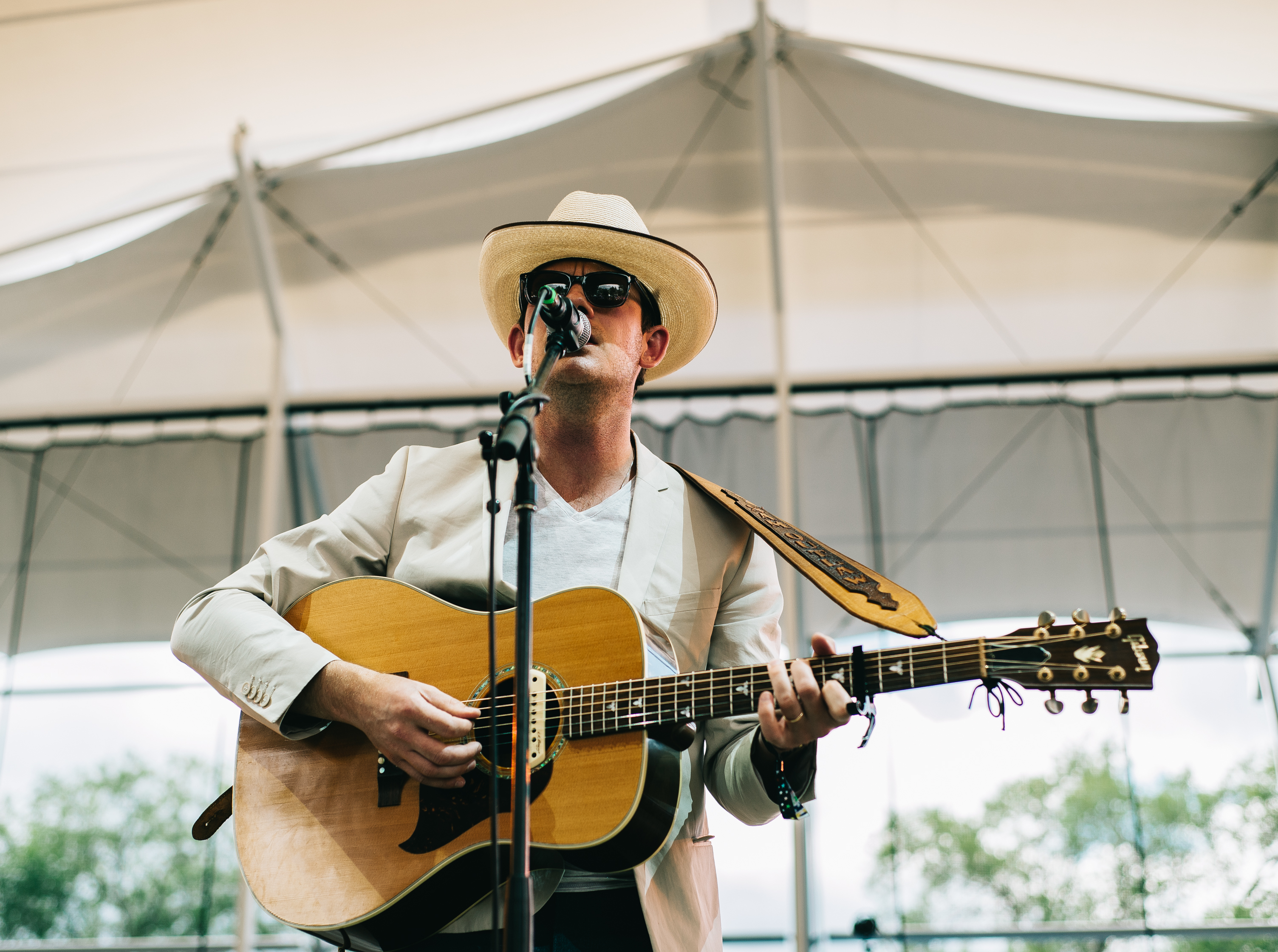
- Sam Outlaw at Interstellar Rodeo 2016 Edmonton, Canada

Background information
- Born: Sam Morgan; July 28, 1982 (age 44); Aberdeen, South Dakota, U.S.
- Genres: Country, honky-tonk, Americana
- Occupation: country music singer-songwriter
- Instruments: Vocals guitar
- Years active: 2009–present
- Label: Six Shooter Records
- Website: www.samoutlaw.com

Sam Morgan (born July 28, 1982), professionally known as Sam Outlaw, is a country music singer-songwriter and producer. Outlaw calls his music "SoCal country", country music refashioned with a Southern California vibe of the classic honky-tonk and troubadour pop.

== Early life ==
Outlaw was born in Aberdeen, South Dakota as Sam Morgan. At the age of 10, his family moved to southern California. He grew up in a conservative Christian home and was limited by his parents as to what kind of music he could listen to. He did however, note the influence of Western Swing band Asleep at the Wheel and how their all-star tribute albums to Bob Wills & His Texas Playboys acted as "country music in a bottle" for him. The Beatles were also a huge influence on Outlaw. As a young adult, he had a musical revelation when he heard the classic country voices of Emmylou Harris and George Jones. Outlaw notes that George Jones' music inspired him to get more serious about playing the guitar and writing songs.

In "his late 20s ... both his parents’ and his own marriage simultaneously crumbled."

When Outlaw decided to actively pursue a music career, he borrowed his mother's maiden name, Outlaw, for a stage moniker. His mother has since died and he honors her by continuing to use the family name.

== Career ==
Sam Outlaw had a successful advertising career in Southern California; however, on his thirtieth birthday he switched gears to pursue his passion for music. Outlaw self-released an EP in 2014. It immediately created a buzz and he secured performance slots at the Stagecoach Festival and AmericanaFest produced by the Americana Music Association.

CMT featured his music video, Cry For Me, in 2014.

While enlisting a crack group of backing musicians to record Angeleno, Outlaw's first LP, he began working with musician and record producer, Ry Cooder. Outlaw wrote all of the songs on Angeleno. Ry Cooder and his son, drummer Joachim Cooder, co-produced and played on the album. Other musicians on the album include Bo Koster, Taylor Goldsmith, Gabe Witcher and vocalist Arnold McCuller.

On March 3, 2015, Outlaw was signed to the reputable Six Shooter Records as its first US act. Outlaw was featured in Rolling Stone as one of the top country music artists to see at SXSW in 2015.

Outlaw's second studio album, Tenderheart, was released on April 14 and debuted at number 3 on the UK Country Albums Chart and garnered two award nominations from the British Country Music Association.

On May 3, 2019 – the same night he made his debut on the Grand Ole Opry – Outlaw released an EP called Hat Acts. At the time of its release, he wrote on his website: “I wanted to do something different with this album. Hat Acts is inspired by honky tonk scenes, hip-hop skits and of course – real life. This is a bit of a ‘concept album’ and I had a lot of fun putting it together.” Later that summer, he released a duet with Sarah Darling called "Forever & Always" across streaming platforms and was also a radio single in the United Kingdom.

=== As producer ===
September 27, 2019, saw the release of Outlaw's first project as a producer when Michaela Anne released Desert Dove on Yep Roc. He co-produced the album with longtime friend, collaborator and member of Delta Spirit, Kelly Winrich. Rolling Stone described the album as, "is a shimmering sonic statement of purpose that cements the 33-year-old artist as a nuanced songwriter with a penchant for telling difficult stories." The album garnered critical acclaim from outlets including Rolling Stone (#10), Stereogum (#9), and Entertainment Focus (#10) who included the record on each of their respective end of year "Best of 2019" lists.

== Discography ==
=== Studio albums ===
Title	Details	Peak positions			Sales
Title	Details	US Heat	US Indie	UK Country	Sales
Angeleno	Release date: June 9, 2015; Label: Six Shooter Records	22	—	4	
Tenderheart	Release date: April 14, 2017; Label: Six Shooter Records	17	42	3	—
Hat Acts (EP)	Release date: May 3, 2019; Label: Black Hills Recordings	—	—	—	—
Popular Mechanics	Release date: November 12, 2021; Label: Black Hills Recordings	—	—	19	—
Terra Cotta	Release date: March 15, 2024; Label: Black Hills Recordings	—	—	—	—
"—" denotes releases that did not chart

=== Promotional Singles ===
Title	Details
"Love Is On A Roll"	Release date: March 29, 2019; Label: Black Hills Recordings
"Forever and Always" (Duet with Sarah Darling)	Release date: July 26, 2019; Label: Black Hills Recordings

=== Music videos ===
Year	Video	Director
2014	"Cry for Me"	Matt Wignall
2015	"Ghost Town"	Vern Moen
2016	"Angeleno"	Max Cutrone
2017	"Trouble"	Chris Phelps

=== Producer Discography ===
Artist	Title	Label	Release Date	Notes
Michaela Anne	Desert Rose	Yep Roc	September 27, 2019	Co-produced with Kelly Winrich
