= Michaela Anne =

American musician

- Born: Michaela Anne Neller
- Origin: Brooklyn, New York
- Genres: Americana; country
- Years active: 2014–present
- Labels: Georgia June Records; Kingswood Records; Yep Roc Records
- Website: www.michaelaanne.com

Michaela Anne is an American musician currently residing in Nashville, Tennessee. Her music incorporates elements of classic country, pop, indie rock, and honky-tonk. She has released four albums to date. Her fourth album, Oh To Be That Free, was released through Yep Roc Records on June 10, 2022.

== Career ==
Michaela Anne first began garnering national attention with the 2014 release of ‘Ease My Mind,’ an old-school collection hailed by The New York Times for its “plain-spoken songs of romantic regret and small-town longing” and named one of the year's best country albums by The Village Voice. Michaela followed it up in 2016 with album ‘Bright Lights and the Fame,’ which featured guest appearances by Rodney Crowell and Punch Brother Noam Pikelny. Songs from the record landed on high-profile Spotify playlists as well as the HBO series ‘Divorce,’ and the album earned Michaela slots at Bristol Rhythm & Roots, Merlefest, and both the US and UK iterations of AmericanaFest, along with a series of dates across the States and Europe with the likes of Mandolin Orange, Courtney Marie Andrews, Joe Pug, Ron Pope, and Sam Outlaw.

In 2018, Michaela left Nashville behind to record ‘Desert Dove’ in San Clemente, CA. The record was cut slow and steady over the course of several weeks with an all-star band, which included guitarist Brian Whelan (Dwight Yoakam, Jim Lauderdale), fiddler Kristin Weber (Kacey Musgraves, Margo Price), and drummers Mark Stepro (Ben Kweller, Butch Walker) and Daniel Bailey (Everest, Father John Misty). The production pairing of Outlaw and Winrich also proved to be an ideal fit for Michaela, with each artist bringing their own unique skill sets and approaches to the studio. Soon after, Michaela was signed to Yep Roc Records. Desert Dove was released on September 27, 2019.

== Discography ==
- To Know Where (2011, Self Released)
- Ease My Mind (2014, Georgia June)
- Bright Lights and the Fame (2016, Kingswood)
- Desert Dove (2019, Yep Roc)
- Oh To Be That Free (2022, Yep Roc)
