= Love Me Like You Mean It =

- Artwork for initial digital release

Single by Kelsea Ballerini

from the album The First Time and the EP Kelsea Ballerini
- Released: July 8, 2014
- Recorded: 2014
- Genre: Country pop
- Length: 3:19 (album version); 3:15 (video version); 3:03 (single version)
- Label: Black River
- Songwriter(s): Kelsea Ballerini; Josh Kerr; Forest Glen Whitehead; Lance Carpenter
- Producer(s): Forest Glen Whitehead

Kelsea Ballerini singles chronology
"Love Me Like You Mean It" (2014)	"Dibs" (2015)

Music video
- "Love Me Like You Mean It" on YouTube

"Love Me Like You Mean It" is a song co-written and recorded by American country pop singer Kelsea Ballerini. Ballerini co-wrote the song with Josh Kerr, Forest Glen Whitehead and Lance Carpenter. It was released on July 8, 2014, as Ballerini's debut single and the lead single from her debut studio album, The First Time, released on May 19, 2015, by Black River Entertainment. The song is about a young woman showing interest in a man. The song was previously released in promotion of Ballerini's 2014 self-titled EP.

"Love Me Like You Mean It" peaked at number one on the Billboard Country Airplay chart, making Ballerini the first solo female to top that chart with her debut single since Carrie Underwood's "Jesus, Take the Wheel" in 2006 and the first female country music artist to accomplish that on an independent label. It also charted at number five on the Hot Country Songs chart and number 45 on the US Billboard Hot 100. The song was certified Platinum by the Recording Industry Association of America (RIAA), and has sold 596,000 units in the US as of May 2016. It achieved similar chart success in Canada, peaking at number three on the Canada Country chart and number 61 on the Canadian Hot 100. It garnered a Gold certification from Music Canada, denoting sales of 40,000 units in that country.

The accompanying music video for the song, directed by Kristin Barlowe, was shot in Nashville and features Ballerini playing party games outside with her friends and performing throughout various locations.

On April 5, 2024, in honor of the song's tenth anniversary, Ballerini released a new version of the song entitled "Love You Like You Mean It (Reimagined)".

== Content ==
The song is a mid-tempo country pop song that, according to the digital sheet music published by Hal Leonard Music Publishing, is composed in the key of E major, in cut time with a primary chord pattern of E–B–F♯m7_{add}4–A_{sus}2. Ballerini's vocal ranges one octave, from B_{3} to B_{4}. Natalie Wiener of Billboard called "Love Me Like You Mean It" a song "about being a young woman who's openly expressing interest in a man," making the song a subtle message of feminism. She compared the song's opening line, "Oh hey, boy with your hat back/Mmm I kind of like that/if you wanna walk my way," to Carly Rae Jepsen's 2012 hit, "Call Me Maybe".

== Reception ==
=== Critical ===
Taste of Country reviewed the single favorably, saying that "Ballerini mixes modern production techniques with a straight-up country message to create an identifiable country-pop blend." In 2017, Billboard contributor Chuck Dauphin placed "Love Me Like You Mean It" at number one on his top 10 list of Ballerini's best songs.

=== Commercial ===
"Love Me Like You Mean It" debuted at number 60 on the US Billboard Country Airplay chart for the week of October 18, 2014, and debuted at number 48 on the US Billboard Hot Country Songs chart for the week of December 13, 2014. It reached number one on the Country Airplay chart for the week of July 4, 2015, making Ballerini the first solo female to send her debut single to the top of that chart since Carrie Underwood did with "Jesus, Take the Wheel" in 2006; it also made her the first female country music artist to do so on an independent label. The song was certified Gold by the RIAA on July 14, 2015, and certified Platinum on August 4, 2016. The song has sold 596,000 copies in the US as of May 2016. In Canada, the song reached the top three of the Canada Country chart and peaked at number 61 on the Canadian Hot 100. It was certified Gold by Music Canada on September 12, 2016.

== Music video ==
An acoustic music video was directed by Robert Chavers and premiered in November 2014. The official music video, directed by Kristin Barlowe, was filmed in Nashville and premiered in March 2015. In it, Ballerini is seen playing games like musical chairs and Twister with her friends outside, while performing the song from various locations inside a trailer and in the doorway of a house.

=== Reception ===
The video was nominated at the 2015 CMT Music Awards in the category of Breakthrough Video of the Year, but lost to Sam Hunt's "Leave the Night On".

== Track listing ==
Digital download
No.	Title	Length
1.	"Love Me Like You Mean It"	3:19

Country Dance Mix single
No.	Title	Length
1.	"Love Me Like You Mean It" (Country Dance Mix)	3:35

Dance Mix single with Dave Audé
No.	Title	Length
1.	"Love Me Like You Mean It" (featuring Kelsea Ballerini) (Dance Mix)	3:28

CD single
No.	Title	Length
1.	"Love Me Like You Mean It"	3:03
2.	"Love Me Like You Mean It"	3:03
3.	"Love Me Like You Mean It"	3:03
4.	"Research Hook #1"	0:18
5.	"Research Hook #2"	0:10
Total length:		9:37

== Charts and certifications ==
=== Weekly charts ===
Chart (2014–2015)	Peak position
Canada (Canadian Hot 100)	61
Canada Country (Billboard)	3
US Billboard Hot 100	45
US Country Airplay (Billboard)	1
US Hot Country Songs (Billboard)	5

=== Year-end charts ===
Chart (2015)	Position
US Country Airplay (Billboard)	36
US Hot Country Songs (Billboard)	27

=== Certifications ===
Region	Certification	Certified units/sales
Canada (Music Canada)	Gold	40,000^{‡}
United States (RIAA)	Platinum	1,000,000^{‡} / 596,000
^{‡} Sales+streaming figures based on certification alone.

== Release history ==
Country	Date	Format	Version	Label	Ref.
Worldwide	July 8, 2014	Digital download	Original	Black River	
United States	September 22, 2014	Country radio	Original	Black River	
Worldwide	August 28, 2015	Digital download	Country Dance Mix	Black River	
Worldwide	February 12, 2016	Digital download	Dave Audé Dance Mix	Black River	
Worldwide	April 5, 2024	Digital download; streaming	Reimagined	Black River	
