= Sarah Jarosz =

American musician (born 1991)

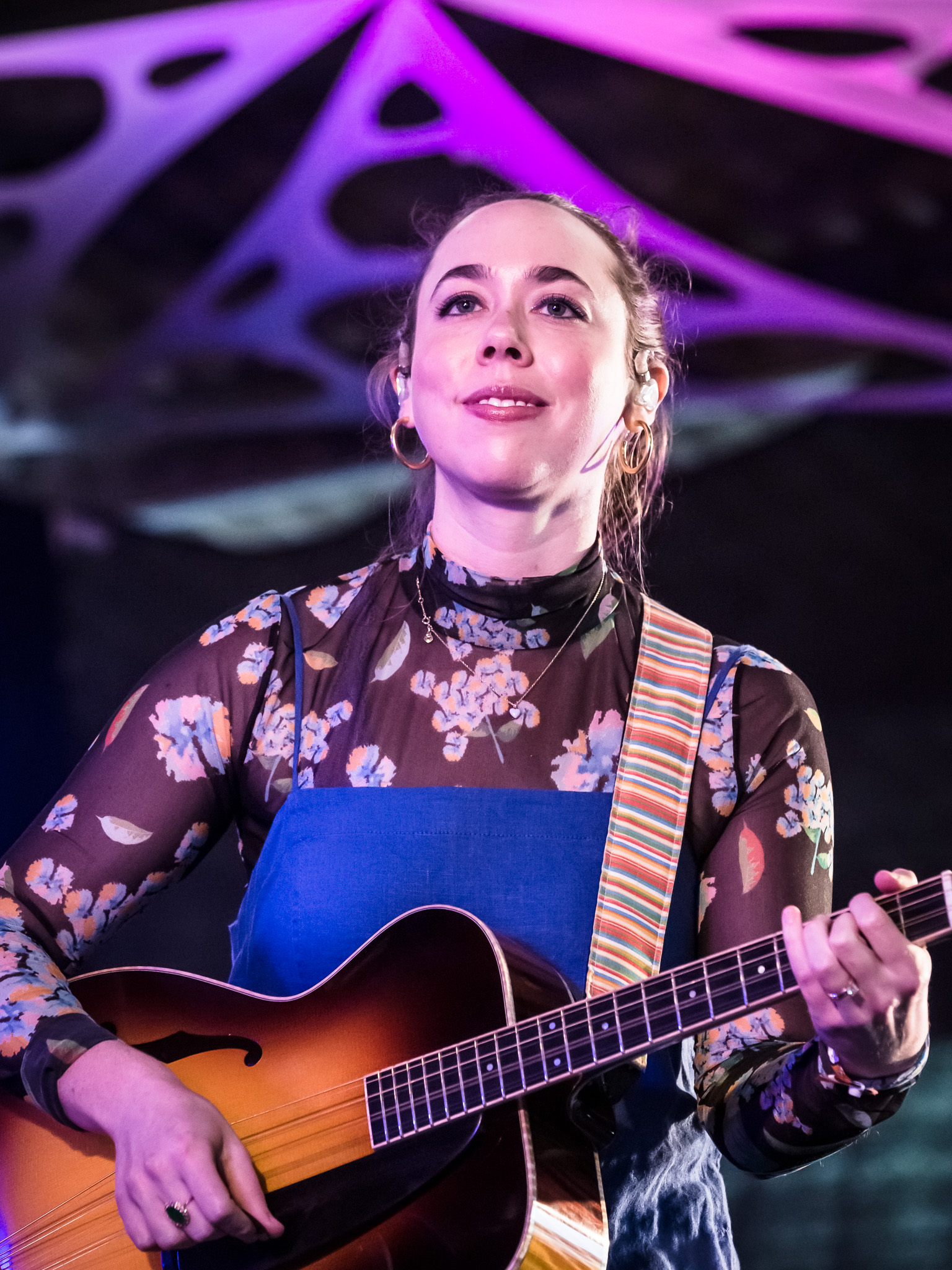
- Jarosz performing at the Purbeck Valley Folk Festival in Dorset, England, 2023

Background information
- Born: Sarah Ellen Jarosz; May 23, 1991 (age 35); Austin, Texas, U.S.
- Genres: Americana; country folk; bluegrass; folk
- Occupation: Singer-songwriter
- Instruments: Vocals; mandolin; banjo; guitar; octave mandolin
- Years active: 2007–present
- Labels: Sugar Hill; Rounder
- Member of: I'm with Her
- Website: sarahjarosz.com

Sarah Ellen Jarosz (/dʒəˈroʊz/ jə-ROHZ; born May 23, 1991) is an American singer-songwriter from Wimberley, Texas. Her debut studio album, Song Up in Her Head, was released in 2009 on Sugar Hill Records and the track "Mansinneedof" was nominated for a Grammy Award in the category of Best Country Instrumental Performance. Her second album, Follow Me Down, was released in 2011; one of its songs, "Come Around," was a Song of the Year nominee at the Americana Music Association's 2012 Honors and Awards. Her third album, Build Me Up from Bones, was released on September 24, 2013 on Sugar Hill. Build Me Up from Bones was nominated for Best Folk Album at the 56th Annual Grammy Awards, and its title track was nominated for Best American Roots Song. In 2016, Jarosz released her fourth studio album, Undercurrent. The album won two Grammy Awards – Best Folk Album, and Best American Roots Performance for the song "House of Mercy".

On June 5, 2020, she released World on the Ground, her first solo studio album in four years. It was nominated for two Grammy Awards (Best American Roots Song and Best Americana Album) with Jarosz winning in the Best Americana Album category.

== Early life and education ==
Sarah Ellen Jarosz was born May 23, 1991, in Austin, Texas, and raised in Wimberley, Texas. Her parents were teachers. Jarosz is a Polish name. She began learning the mandolin at age 10 and later began learning to play the guitar, clawhammer banjo, and octave mandolin. During her senior year of high school, Jarosz signed a recording contract with Sugar Hill Records and released her debut album Song Up in Her Head in June 2009; it was produced by Jarosz and Gary Paczosa. Guest musicians on the album included Chris Thile, Darrell Scott, Stuart Duncan, and Jerry Douglas. Jarosz enrolled in the New England Conservatory of Music in 2009, and graduated with honors in 2013 with a degree in Contemporary Improvisation.

== Career ==
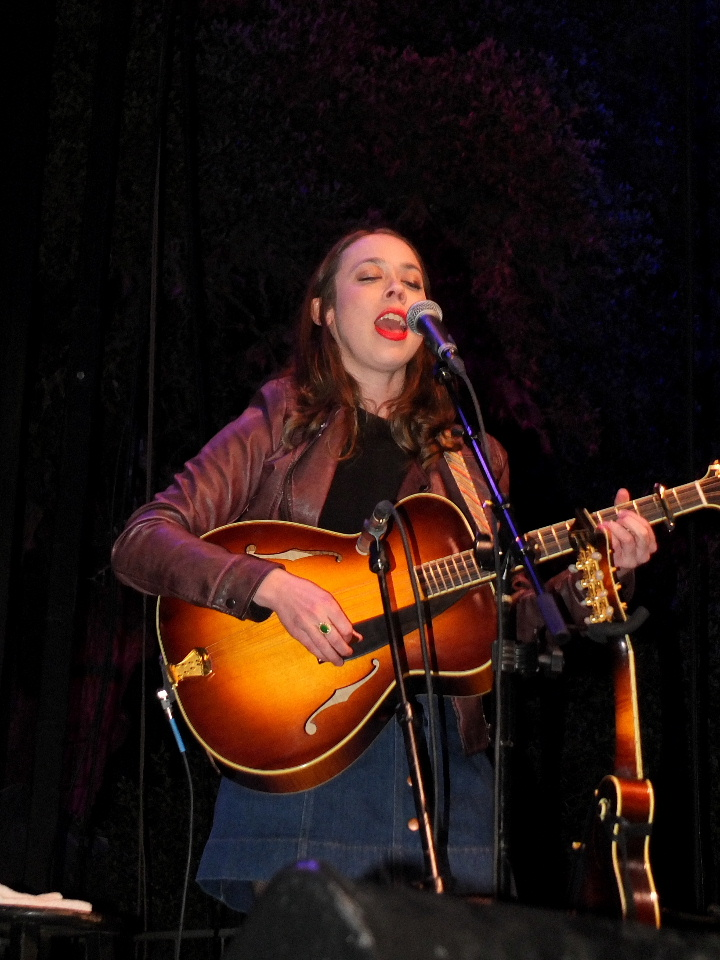
Jarosz at Old Settler's Music Festival, 2017

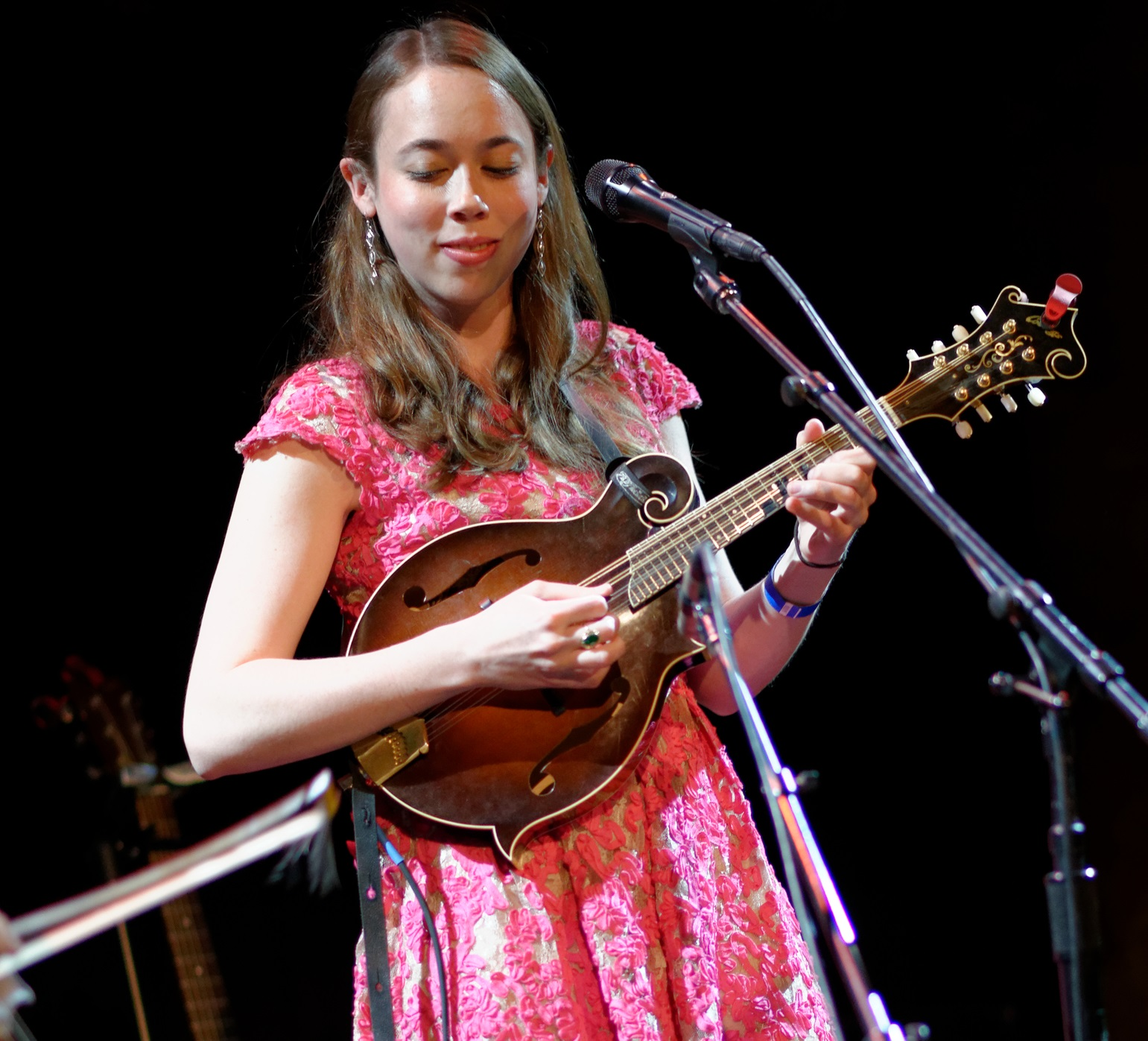
Jarosz performing in San Francisco, 2014

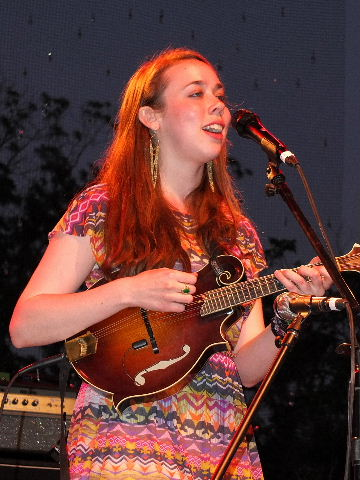
Jarosz performing at Old Settler's Music Festival, 2012

In 2010 Jarosz recorded the album Follow Me Down and again shared production duties with Gary Paczosa. The album was recorded in Nashville and features guest musicians Bela Fleck, Jerry Douglas, Stuart Duncan, Viktor Krauss, Dan Tyminski, Shawn Colvin, Darrell Scott, and bandmates Alex Hargreaves and Nathaniel Smith. A session with Punch Brothers in New York produced a cover of the Radiohead song "The Tourist". An American Songwriter reviewer wrote that "Jarosz invites us along with her into a growing sonic space of collaboration and artistry at this the second step in what will surely be a long and productive musical journey." In 2011 Jarosz performed at Jerry Douglas' the Transatlantic Sessions in Scotland. She performed Bob Dylan's "Ring Them Bells."

In 2012, Jarosz appeared on Kate Rusby's album 20, collaborating with Rusby on the song "Planets".

In 2015, Jarosz toured extensively with Sara Watkins (a founding member of Nickel Creek) and Aoife O'Donovan (of Crooked Still fame) as well as going on tour with Garrison Keillor on The America the Beautiful Tour – A Prairie Home Companion. In 2016, she became a regular performer on the weekly NPR series Live from Here, hosted by Chris Thile.

Together with Watkins and O'Donovan, Jarosz became a founding member of the progressive-folk trio I'm With Her. They released their debut album, See You Around, in 2018.

Her fourth studio album, Undercurrent, was released on June 17, 2016. It won the Grammy for Best Folk Album along with the song "House of Mercy" winning the Grammy for Best American Roots Performance at the 2017 Grammy Awards.

In 2020, Jarosz returned to her solo career with her fifth studio album, World on the Ground. This was followed 11 months later by the release of her sixth studio album, Blue Heron Suite. The previously-shelved collection was originally written and recorded between 2017 and 2018.

On September 7, 2023, Jarosz released the official video of her song "Jealous Moon", from her album Polaroid Lovers, which was released on January 26, 2024. October 10 saw the release of "Columbus & 89th", the second single off the album.

== Critical reception ==
Jarosz has been called "a songwriter of uncommon wisdom" by the Austin Chronicle. Jarosz has been interviewed by NPR and Rolling Stone and described as a contemporary-bluegrass prodigy. A New York Times reviewer wrote that Jarosz is "widely regarded as one of acoustic music's most promising young talents: a singer-songwriter and mandolin and banjo prodigy with the taste and poise to strike that rare balance of commercial and critical success." Her 2013 release, Build Me Up from Bones, was dubbed by Stereo Subversion as an "organic masterwork...a warm, nuanced collection that wraps and enchants the listener", as well as "her boldest work yet" by WNYC Soundcheck.

== Discography ==
=== Studio albums ===
Title	Details	Peak chart positions						
Title	Details	US Grass	Billboard 200	US Heat	US Indie	US Folk	US Rock	US Americana
Song Up in Her Head	Release date: June 16, 2009; Label: Sugar Hill Records; Formats: CD, music download	1	158	3	21	—	—	—
Follow Me Down	Release date: May 17, 2011; Label: Sugar Hill Records; Formats: CD, LP, music download	2	98	—	16	4	26	4
Build Me Up from Bones	Release date: September 24, 2013; Label: Sugar Hill Records; Formats: CD, LP, music download	—	101	—	—	6	30	6
Undercurrent	Release date: June 17, 2016; Label: Sugar Hill Records; Formats: CD, LP, music download	1	117	—	—	6	14	6
World on the Ground	Release date: June 5, 2020; Label: Rounder Records; Formats: CD, LP, music download	—	—	—	—	—	—	25
Blue Heron Suite	Release date: May 7, 2021; Label: Rounder Records; Formats: CD, LP, music download	—	—	—	—	—	—	—
Polaroid Lovers	Release date: January 26, 2024; Label: Rounder Records; Formats: CD, LP, music download	—	—	—	—	—	—	—
"—" denotes releases that did not chart

=== Extended plays ===
Title	Details
Live at the Troubadour	Release date: June 11, 2013; Label: Sugar Hill Records

=== Singles ===
Title	Year	Album
"Annabelle Lee"	2012	Follow Me Down
"Over the Edge"	2013	Build Me Up from Bones
"Green Lights" / "When Doves Cry"	2017	Spotify Singles
"Johnny"	2020	World on the Ground
"Up in the Clouds"	2020	Non-album singles
"I Still Haven't Found What I'm Looking For" / "My Future"	2021	Non-album singles
"Jealous Moon"	2023	Polaroid Lovers
"Columbus & 89th"	2023	Polaroid Lovers

=== Music videos ===
Year	Title	Director
2011	"Run Away"	Adam Hall
2011	"Broussard's Lament" (live)	Bruce Keen
2013	"Over the Edge"	Bill Filipiak
2014	"Build Me Up from Bones"	Bill Filipiak
2016	"House of Mercy"	Sasha Arutyunova/Jacob Blumberg
2017	"Green Lights"	Sasha Arutyunova/Jacob Blumberg
2020	"Johnny"	Grant Claire
2023	"Columbus & 89th"	Jody March
2024	"When The Lights Go Out"	Bella Mazzola

== Awards and nominations ==
=== Americana Music Honors & Awards ===
Year	Nominee / work	Award	Result
2010	Sarah Jarosz	Emerging Artist of the Year	Nominated
2011	Sarah Jarosz	Instrumentalist of the Year	Nominated
2012	"Come Around"	Song of the Year	Nominated
2014	Build Me Up from Bones	Album of the Year	Nominated
2018	I'm with Her	Duo/Group of the Year	Won

=== Grammy Awards ===
Year	Nominee / work	Award	Result
2009	"Mansinneedof"	Best Country Instrumental Performance	Nominated
2014	"Build Me Up from Bones"	Best American Roots Song	Nominated
2014	Build Me Up from Bones	Best Folk Album	Nominated
2017	Undercurrent	Best Folk Album	Won
2017	"House of Mercy"	Best American Roots Performance	Won
2019	"Call My Name"	Best American Roots Performance	Nominated
2019	"Call My Name"	Best American Roots Song	Won
2021	"Hometown"	Best American Roots Song	Nominated
2021	World on the Ground	Best Americana Album	Won
2022	Blue Heron Suite	Best Folk Album	Nominated
2025	Polaroid Lovers	Best Americana Album	Nominated
2025	"Runaway Train"	Best Americana Performance	Nominated
2026	Wild and Clear and Blue	Best Folk Album	Won
2026	"Ancient Light"	Best American Roots Performance	Nominated
2026	"Ancient Light"	Best American Roots Song	Won
