= Gary Paczosa =

Audio engineer and producer

Gary Paczosa is an audio engineer, producer and A&R rep for Sugar Hill Records. He has been nominated 11 times for the Grammy Award for Best Engineered Album, Non-Classical.

He is best known for working with Alison Krauss and Dolly Parton numerous times. He has more recently worked with Sarah Jarosz, Parker Millsap, and Sierra Ferrell.

Originally from Colorado, Paczosa now lives in Nashville.
