= Octave mandolin =

Fretted string instrument

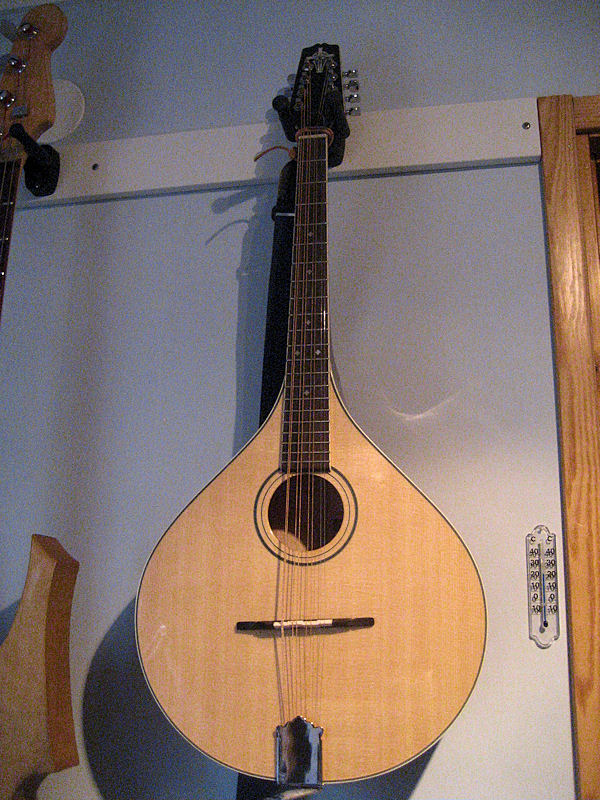
- Other names: Mandola, Octave mandola, Tenor mandola
- Classification: String instrument (plucked)
- Hornbostel–Sachs classification: 321.322 (Composite chordophone)

Related instruments
- List: Cittern; Irish bouzouki; Lute; Mandocello; Mandola; Mandolin

The octave mandolin (US and Canada) or octave mandola (Ireland and UK) is a fretted string instrument with four pairs of strings tuned in fifths, G−D−A−E (low to high). It is larger than the mandola, but smaller than the mandocello and its construction is similar to other instruments in the mandolin family. Usually the courses are all unison pairs, but the lower two may sometimes be strung as octave pairs with the higher-pitched octave string on top so that it is hit before the thicker lower-pitched string. Alternate tunings of G−D−A−D and A−D−A−D are often employed by Celtic musicians.

== Terminology ==
The names of the mandolin family instruments vary between Europe and the United States. The instruments that are known in the US as the mandola and the octave mandolin tend to be known in Great Britain and Ireland as the tenor mandola or the octave mandola. The Irish bouzouki is a very similar instrument, and is often confused with the octave mandolin, but an Irish Bouzouki has a longer scale length and a different tuning than the octave mandolin. Also, octave mandola is sometimes applied to what in the U.S. is a mandocello.

In Europe outside the British isles, mandola is the larger G−D−A−E tuned instrument while the smaller C−G−D−A tuned one is known as alt-mandoline (i.e., alto mandolin), mandoliola or liola.

This geographic distinction is not crisp, and there are cases of each term being used in each country. Jimmy Moon, a Scottish luthier, calls his version of the instrument by both names; Paul Shippey, an English luthier, uses the term "octave mandolin". Confusion will likely continue as the terms continue to be used interchangeably.

== Construction ==
=== Mandolin body ===
Octave mandolin construction is similar to the mandolin: The body may be constructed with a bowl-shaped back according to designs of the 18th century Vinaccia school, or with a flat (arched) back according to the designs of Gibson Guitar Corporation, popularized in the United States in the early 20th century.

The scale length of the octave mandolin is longer than that of the mandolin, and varies more widely, from 19 inches (480 mm) to 24 inches (610 mm), with 21 inches (530 mm) being typical. The internal bracing is similar to the mandolin and mandola, with a single transverse brace on the top just below the oval sound hole. On modern instruments X-bracing is sometimes used.

As is typical of the mandolin family, octave mandolins can be found with either a single oval soundhole or a pair of "f " soundholes. As with the scale length, the number of frets on an octave mandolin also varies widely, from as few as 17 to as many as 24 frets: 18 or 19 frets is typical.

=== Guitar body ===
From the mid-20th century on, a number of makers have produced octave mandolins with guitar-shaped (e.g., the "hourglass" or "figure 8") bodies. These instruments are typically constructed essentially like acoustic guitars, with similar woods and internal bracing. The neck, however, is much narrower, and supports the mandolin string layout, rather than the traditional 6 strings of the guitar.

=== Layout of strings ===
As with the mandolin and mandola, the octave mandolin has four courses of two strings each. The two strings in each course are tuned in unison. Alternate tunings exist in which the strings in some courses are tuned to octaves, rather than unisons, but this is more typical of the Irish Bouzouki.

== Tuning and range ==
Usually, courses of 2 adjacent strings are doubled (tuned to the same pitch). The standard octave mandolin tuning is G_{2}G_{2}−D_{3}D_{3}−A_{3}A_{3}−E_{4}E_{4}, The standard tuning of both the octave and standard mandolin would be GG,DD,AA,EE from lowest to highest string.

- fourth (lowest tone) course: G_{2} (97.9989 Hz)
- third course: D_{3} (146.832 Hz)
- second course: A_{3} (220.000 Hz)
- first (highest tone) course: E_{4} (329.628 Hz)

The average range, therefore, is about three-and-a-half octaves, with the exact range depending on the number of frets on the individual instrument: from about one and one-third octaves below middle C up to A^{♯}_{5} / B^{♭}_{5}, in the octave above middle C, (with 18 frets), to as high as E_{6}, with 24 frets.

== Usage ==
Octave mandolins are sometimes used in mandolin orchestras in place of mandolas. The mandolinists thus avoid learning to read music on the alto clef; music for the octave mandolin is usually written on the more familiar treble clef, and plays an octave lower than the notes shown (see octave clefs).

== See also ==
- Irish bouzouki
- Mandocello
- Mando-bass
- Stringed instrument tunings

== Bibliography ==
- Richards, Tobe A. (2006). The Octave Mandolin Chord Bible: GDAE Standard Tuning 2,160 Chords. United Kingdom: Cabot Books. ISBN 978-0-9553944-5-4.
- McGann, John (2004). A Guide to Octave Mandolin and Bouzouki. USA/Worldwide: Mel Bay Publications.
