= List of The Voice (American TV series) contestants =

This is a list of artists who have competed on the American reality television competition show, The Voice. In its fifteen years running, twenty-nine artists have been granted the title of "The Voice" – Javier Colon, Jermaine Paul, Cassadee Pope, Danielle Bradbery, Tessanne Chin, Josh Kaufman, Craig Wayne Boyd, Sawyer Fredericks, Jordan Smith, Alisan Porter, Sundance Head, Chris Blue, Chloe Kohanski, Brynn Cartelli, Chevel Shepherd, Maelyn Jarmon, Jake Hoot, Todd Tilghman, Carter Rubin, Cam Anthony, Girl Named Tom, Bryce Leatherwood, Gina Miles, Huntley, Asher HaVon, Sofronio Vasquez, Adam David, Aiden Ross, and Alexia Jayy. There were 32 contestants in the first season, 40 in seasons eighteen through twenty, twenty-three, and twenty-five, 48 in seasons two, four through seventeen, twenty-one, twenty-seven, and twenty-eight, 56 in seasons twenty-two, twenty-four, and twenty-six, and 64 in season three. In season twenty-nine, there were 30 contestants.

== Artists ==
Winners

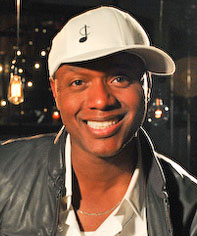
Javier Colon
Season 1

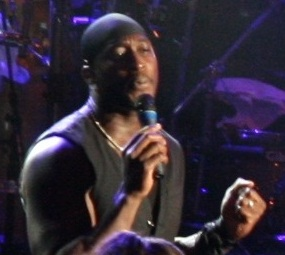
Jermaine Paul
Season 2

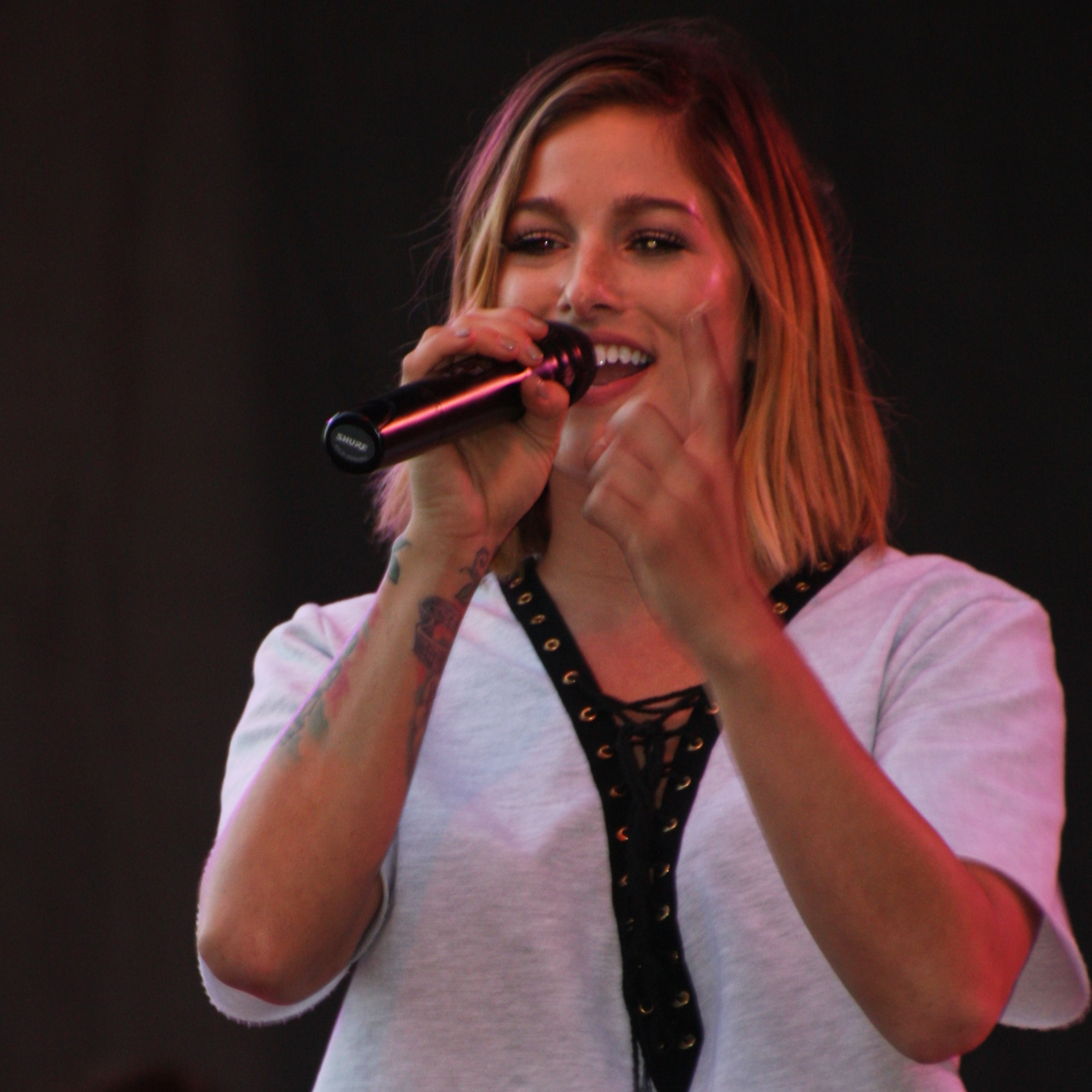
Cassadee Pope
Season 3

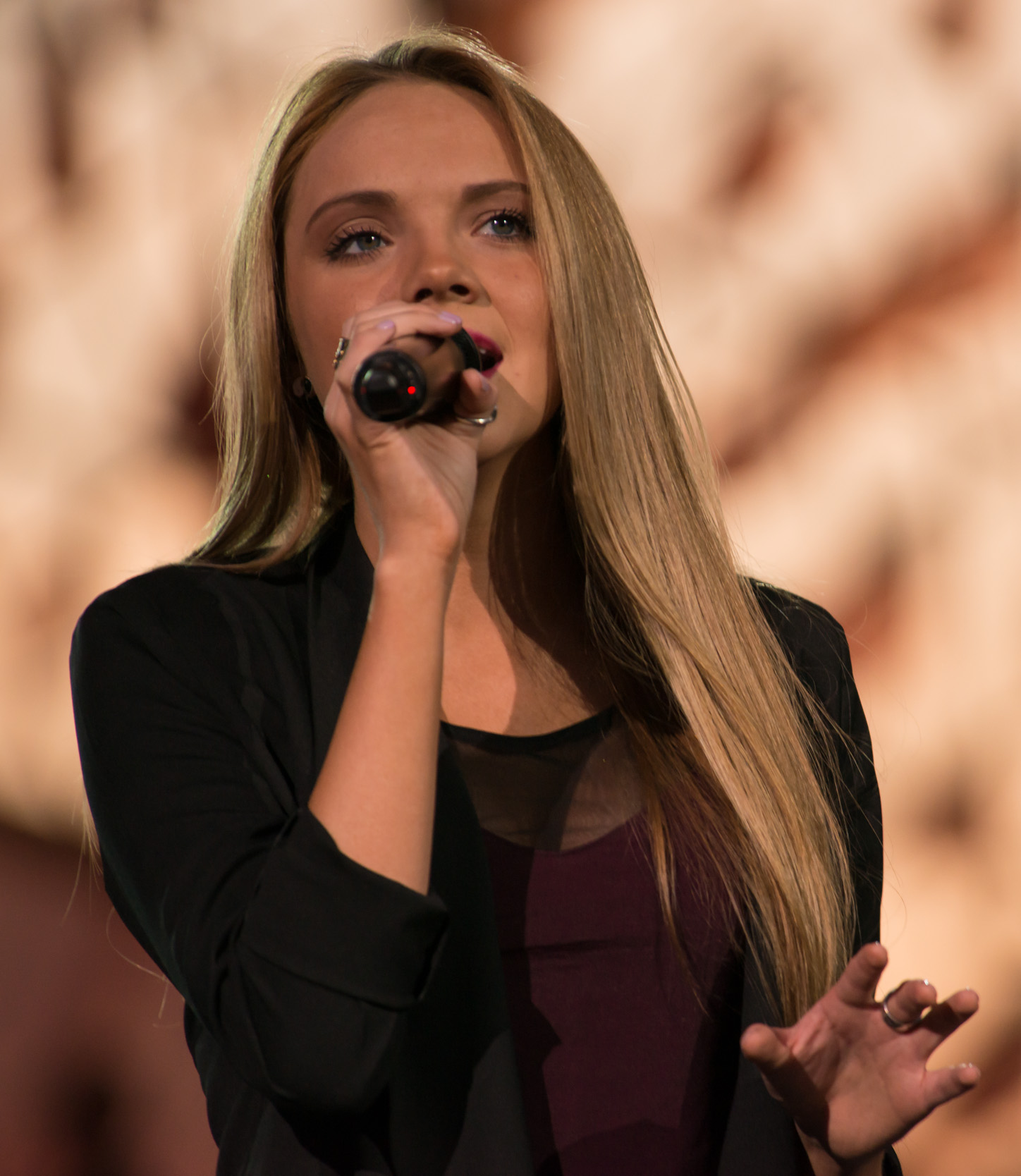
Danielle Bradbery
Season 4

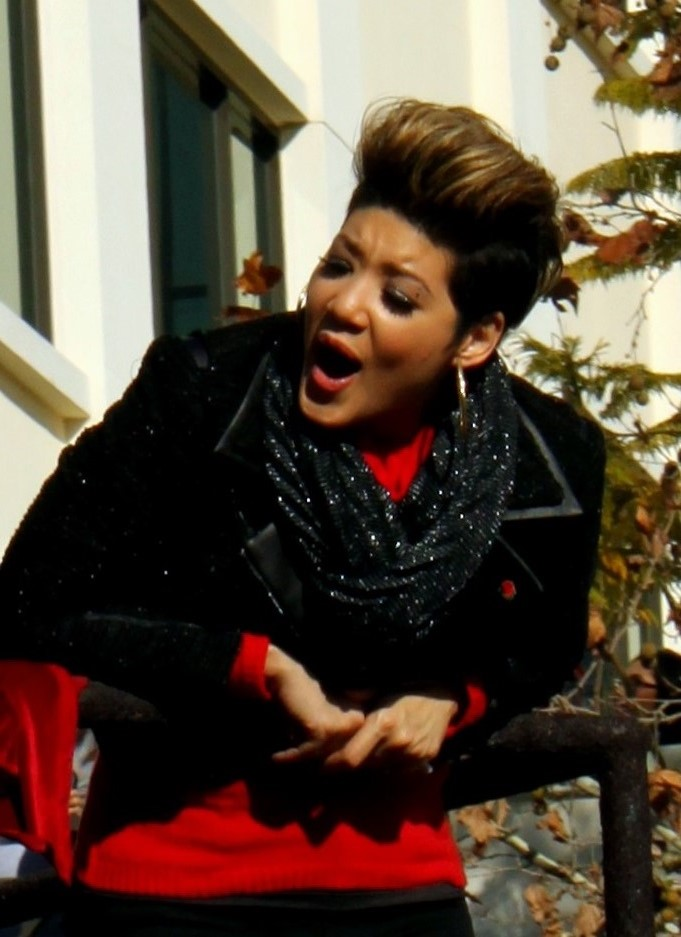
Tessanne Chin
Season 5

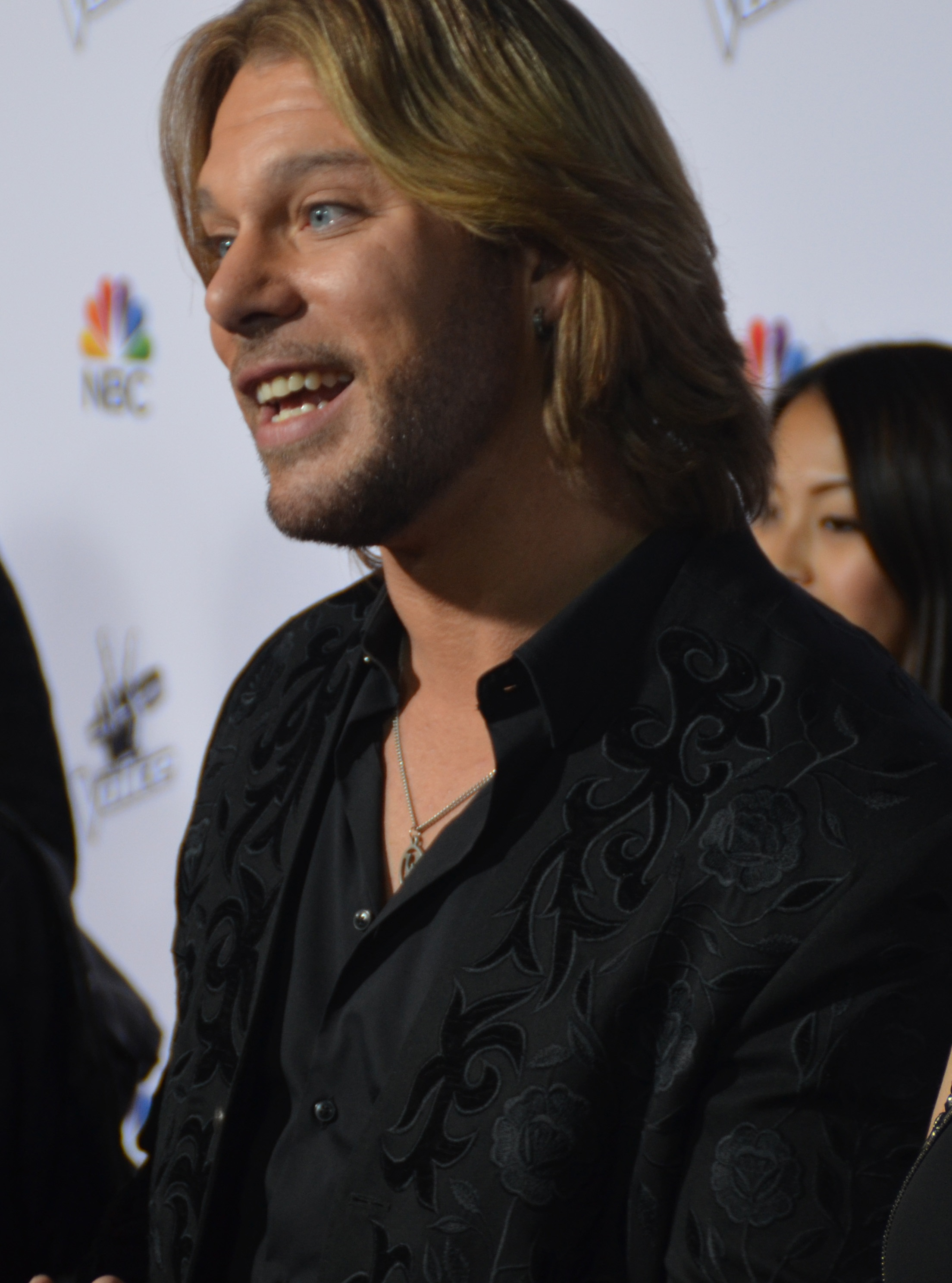
Craig Wayne Boyd
Season 7

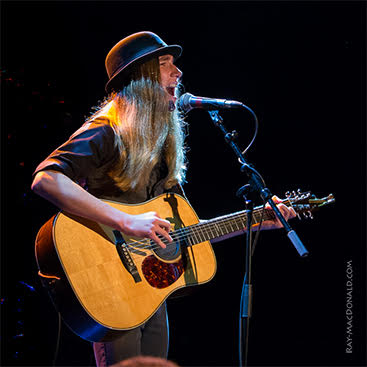
Sawyer Fredericks
Season 8

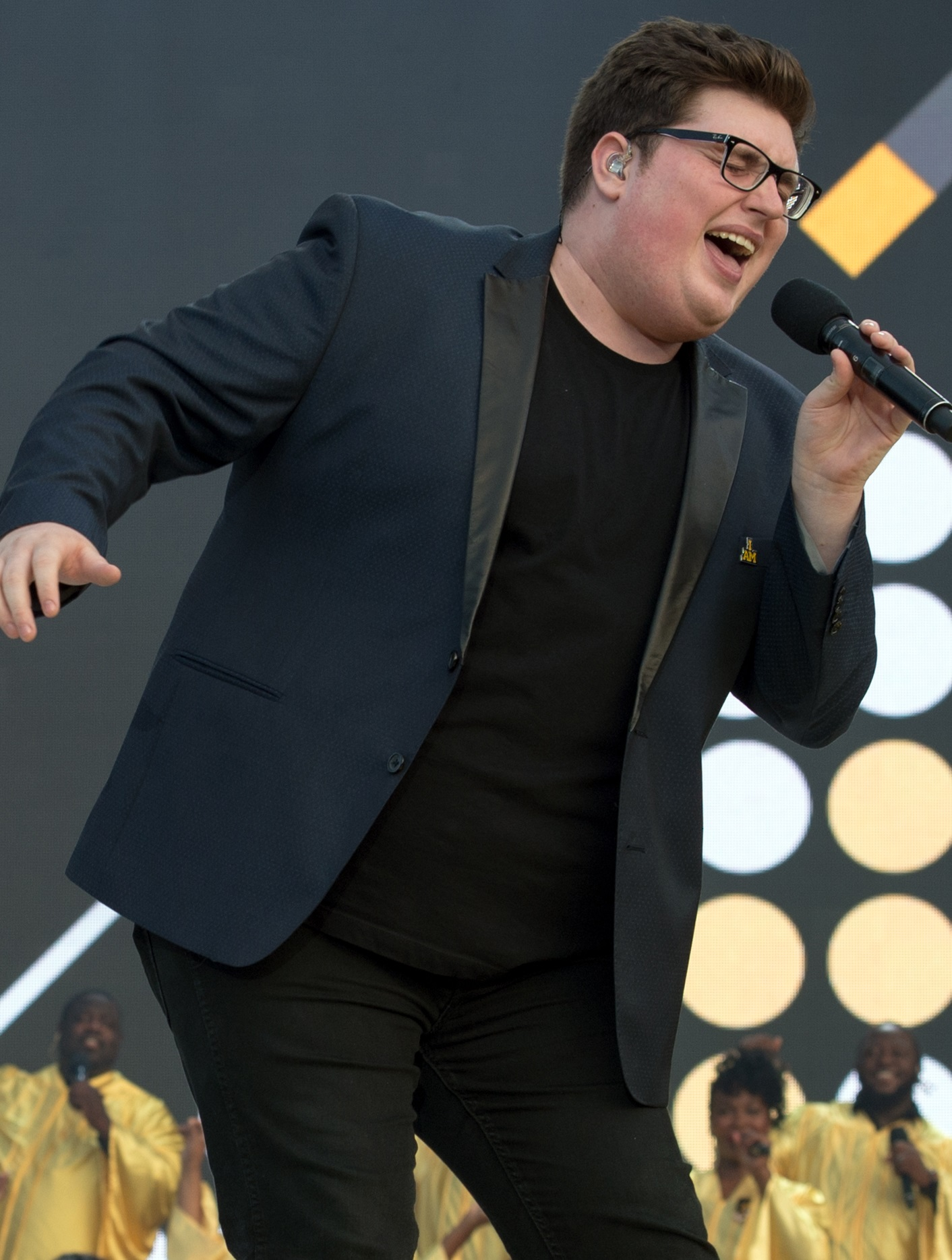
Jordan Smith
Season 9

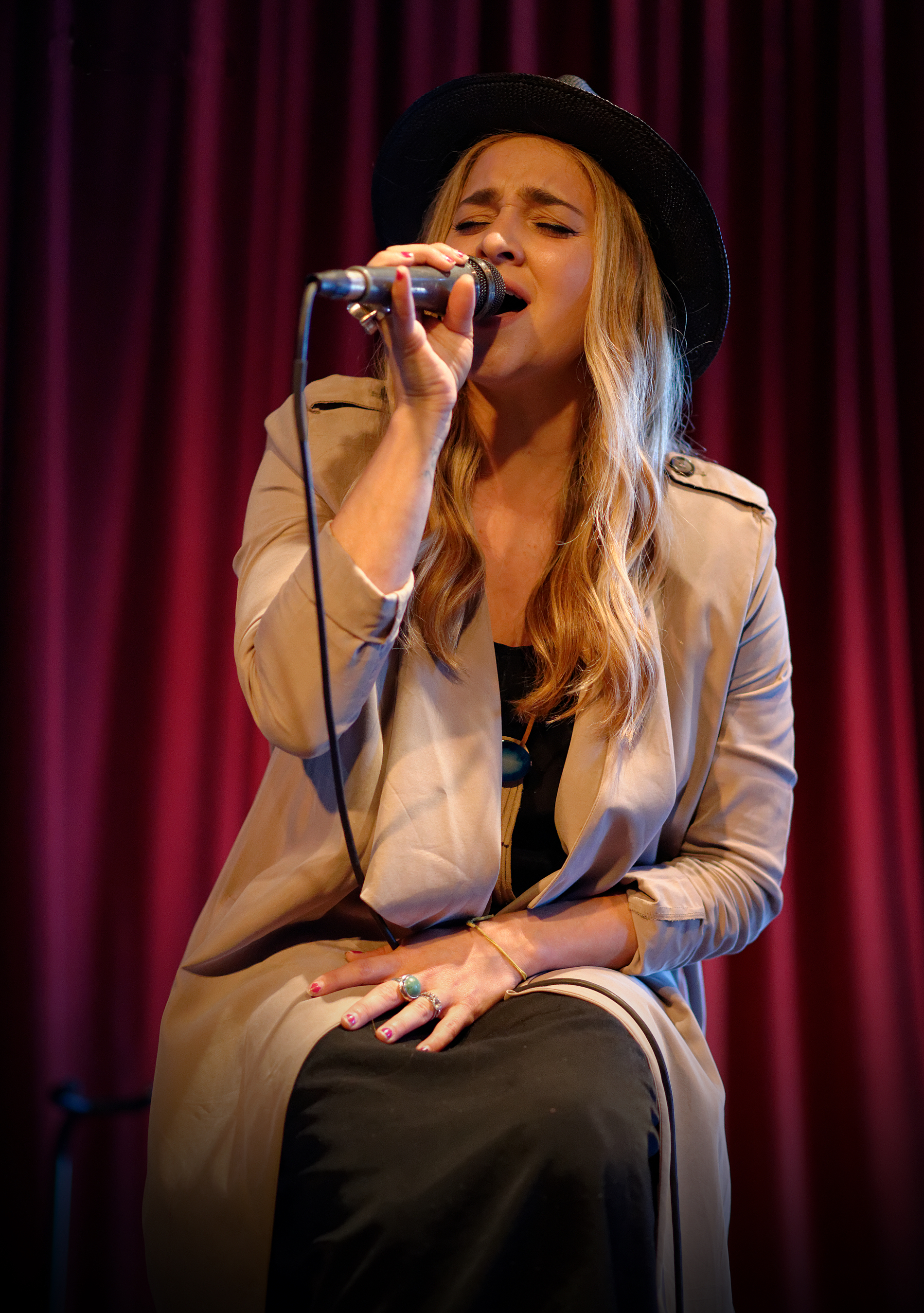
Alisan Porter
Season 10

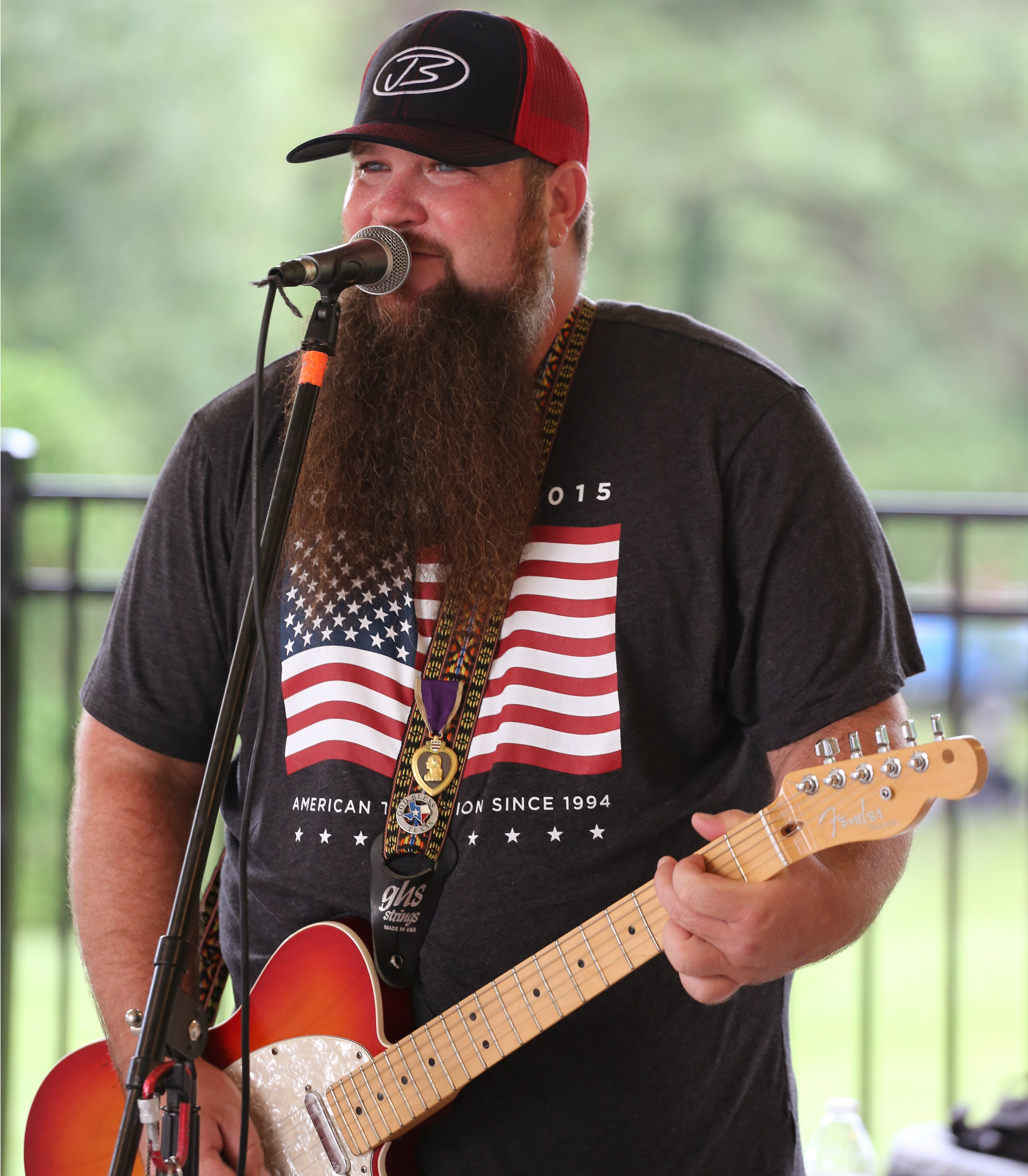
Sundance Head
Season 11

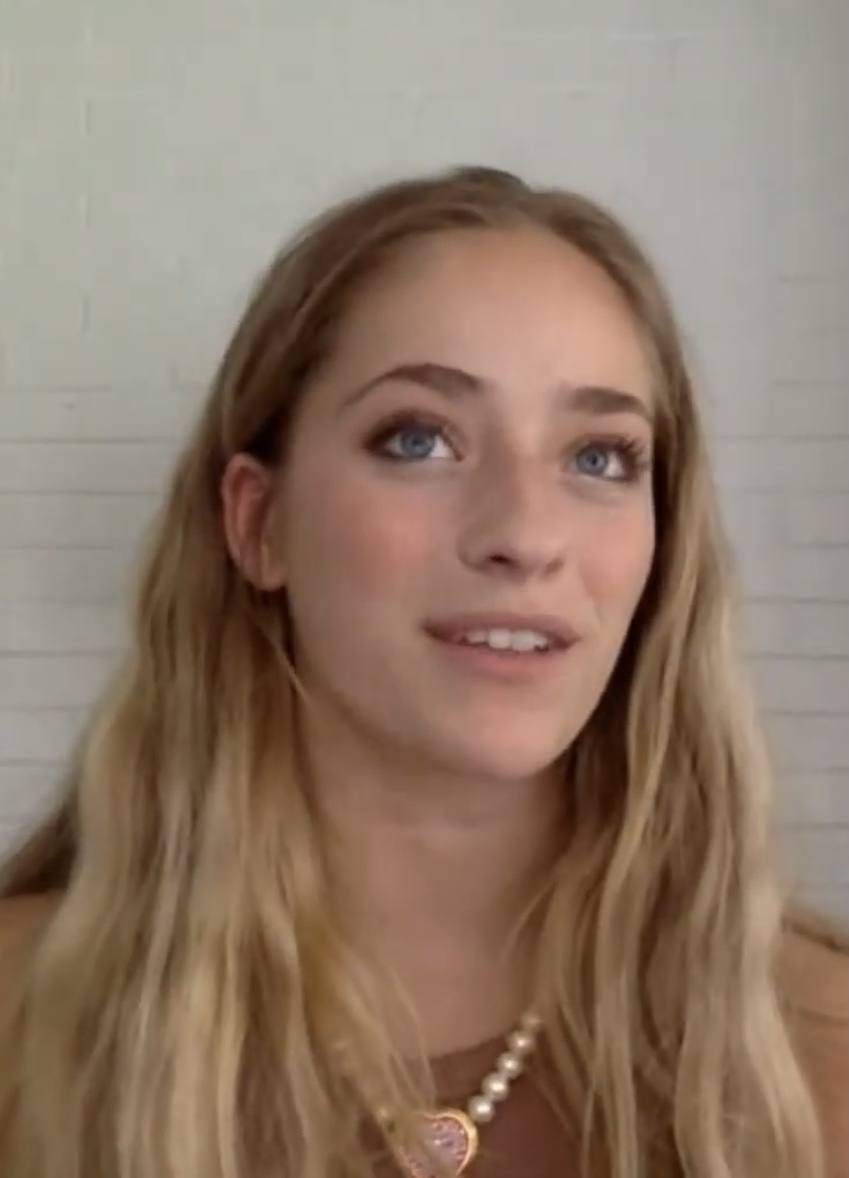
Brynn Cartelli
Season 14

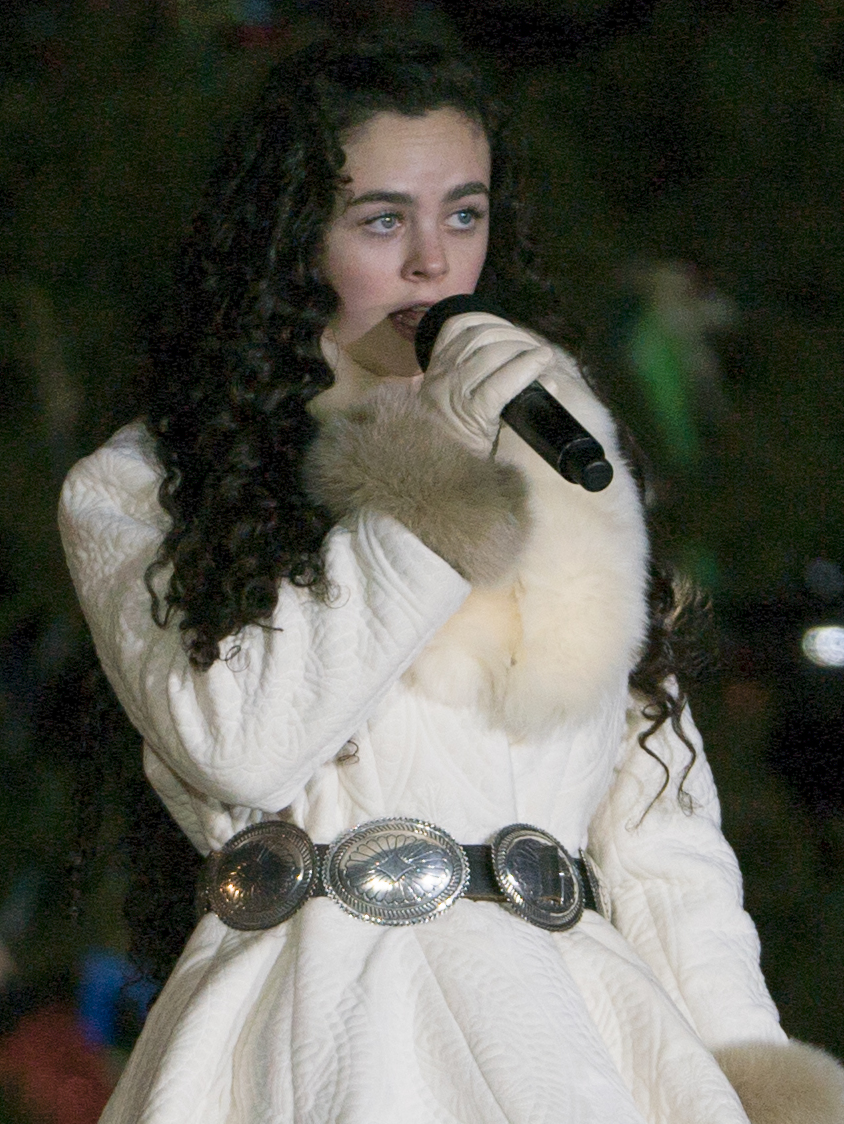
Chevel Shepherd
Season 15

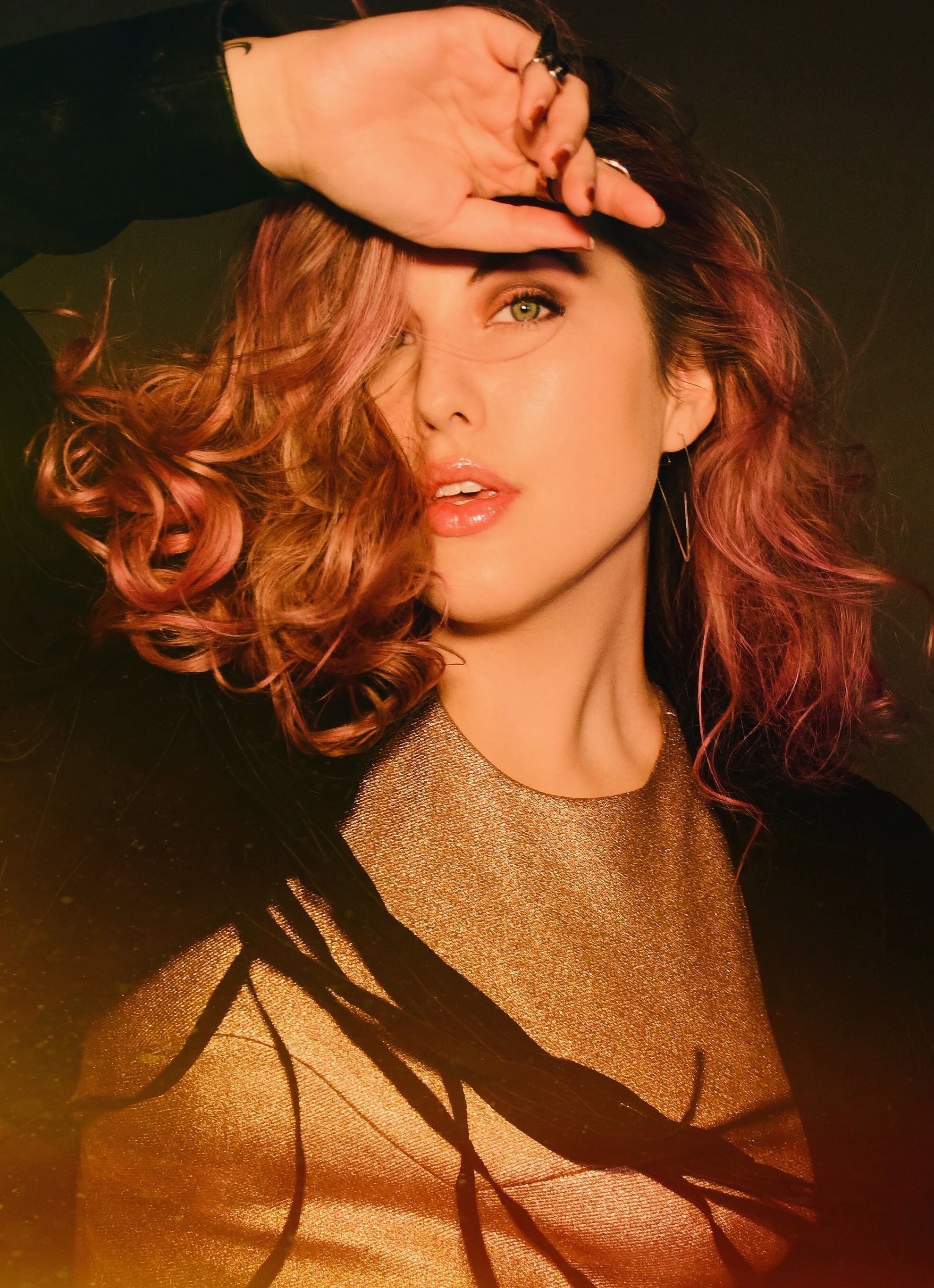
Maelyn Jarmon
Season 16

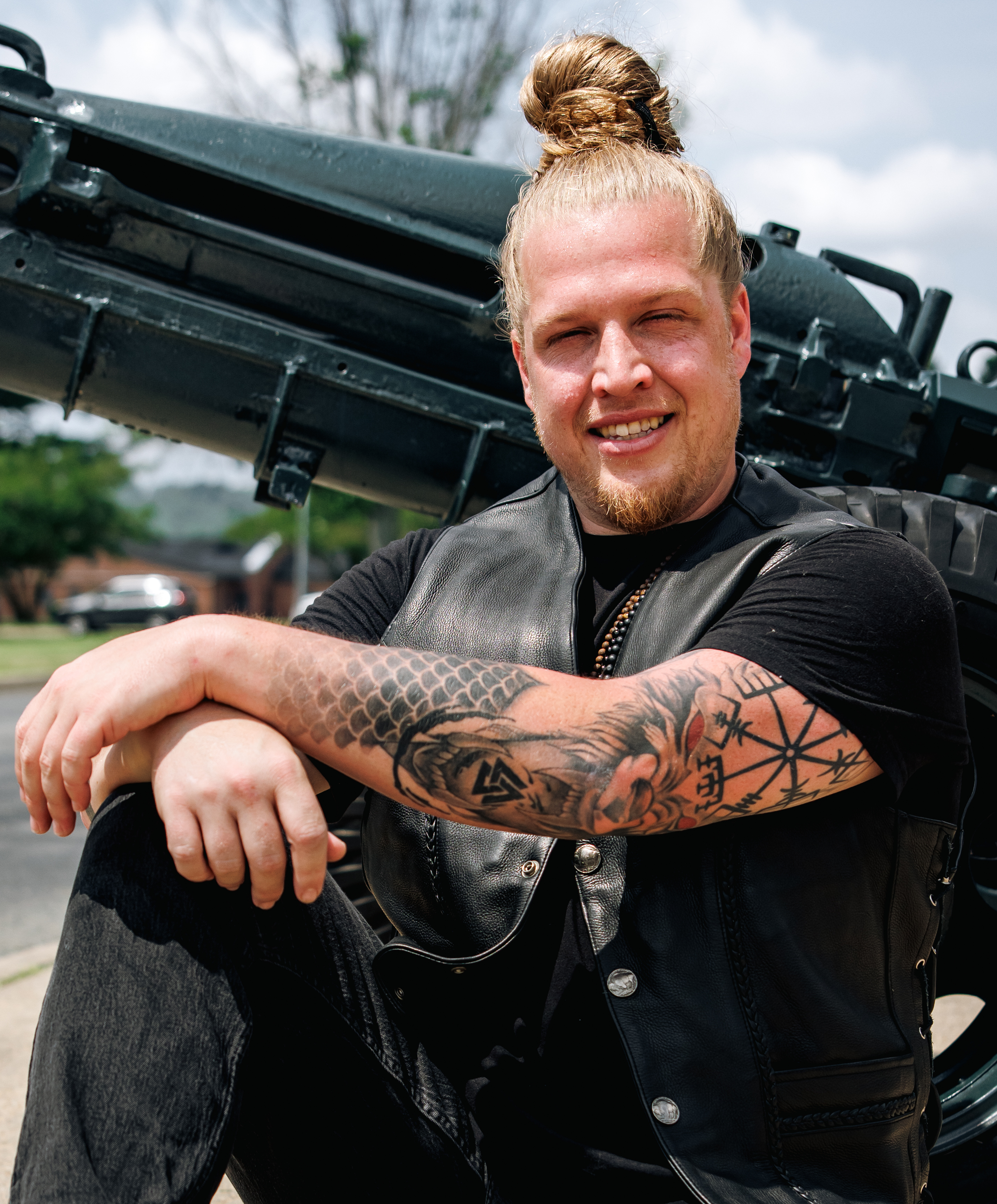
Huntley
Season 24

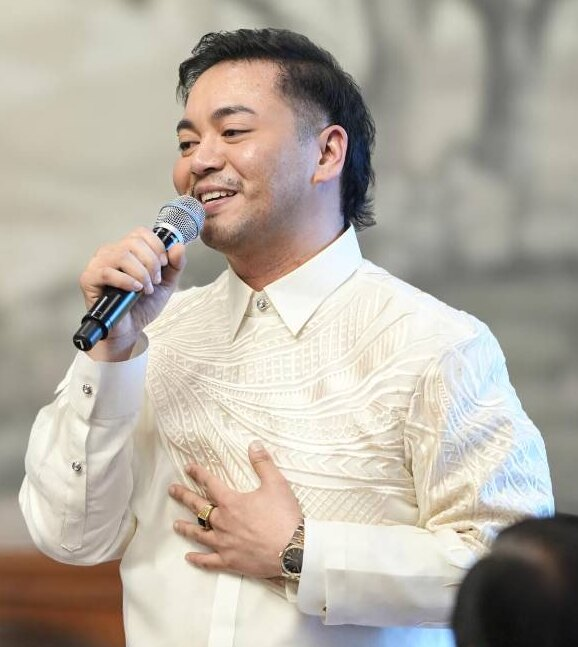
Sofronio Vasquez
Season 26

Artist(s)	Age	Hometown	Coach	Season	Finish
2Steel Girls (Krystal & Allison Steel)	22/44	Nashville, TN	Blake Shelton	3	Battle Rounds
323 (Jonathan Perry, Jacob Sumpter, and Kinsley Treadwell)	18-33	Tallahassee, FL	Reba McEntire	26	Battle Rounds
Aaliyah Rose	14	Provo, UT	Blake Shelton ^{H}	12	Live Playoffs
Aarik Duncan	38	Raleigh, NC	Michael Bublé	28	Battle Rounds
Aaron Gibson	25	Atlanta, GA	Miley Cyrus	11	7th/8th Place
Aaron Hines	28	San Antonio, TX	Kelly Clarkson	21	Battle Rounds
Aaron Konzelman	39	Waco, TX	Blake Shelton	20	Battle Rounds
Aaron LaVigne	43	Cincinnati, OH	Kelly Clarkson	29	Battle Rounds
Aaron Nichols	37	Bakersfield, CA	Reba McEntire	28	Playoffs
Aaron Rizzo	27	Atlanta, GA	Michael Bublé	27	Battle Rounds
Aaron Scott	36	Tomah, WI	Blake Shelton	19	Battle Rounds
Abby Cates	17	Cincinnati, OH	Kelly Clarkson	15	Live Playoffs
Abby Celso	20	Rochester, NY	Pharrell Williams	10	Knockout Rounds
Abby Kasch	20	Palos Park, IL	Kelly Clarkson	16	Live Playoffs ^{N2}
Abigayle Oakley	25	Las Vegas, NV	Kelly Clarkson	29	Knockout Rounds
Adam Bohanan	40	Long Island, NY	Reba McEntire	26	6th/7th/8th Place
Adam Cunningham	38	Nashville, TN	Adam Levine ^{B}	13	5th/6th Place
Adam David	34	Fort Lauderdale, FL	Michael Bublé	27	Winner
Adam Pearce	31	New Orleans, LA	Miley Cyrus ^{A}	13 ^{V10}	Playoffs
Adam Wakefield	33	Hanover, NH	Blake Shelton	10	Runner-up
Adanna Duru	15	Walnut, CA	Adam Levine	3	Battle Rounds
Addison Agen	16	Fort Wayne, IN	Adam Levine ^{J}	13	Runner-up
Adi Arora	21	Short Hills, NJ	John Legend	29	Battle Rounds
Adley Stump	21	Tulsa, OK	Blake Shelton	2	Battle Rounds
Adriana Louise	22	Brooklyn, NY	Christina Aguilera	3	11th/12th Place
Agina Alvarez	23	Burbank, CA	Adam Levine	4 ^{V2}	Battle Rounds
Aiden Ross	20	College Station, TX	Niall Horan	28	Winner
Ainae	21	Washington, D.C.	Kelly Clarkson	20	Battle Rounds
AJ Harvey	25	Wichita, KS	Dan + Shay	25	Battle Rounds
AJ Robinson	14	Cataula, GA	John Legend	29	Battle Rounds
Al Boogie	37	Mansfield, LA	Reba McEntire	24 ^{V18}	Battle Rounds
Alanna Lynise	21	Toledo, OH	Kelsea Ballerini	27	9th/10th/11th/12th Place
Alaska & Madi (Alaska Holloway & Madi Metcalf)	19/18	Tulsa, OK	Blake Shelton	6	Battle Rounds
Alena D'Amico	27	Shelby Charter Township, MI	Kelly Clarkson	16	Battle Rounds
Alessandra Castronovo	21	Millstone Township, NJ	Adam Levine	7	Knockout Rounds
Alessandra Guercio	17	Brooklyn, NY	Christina Aguilera ^{A}	3	Knockout Rounds
Alex Mitchell Brown	26	New Hope, AL	Niall Horan	28	Battle Rounds
Alex Guthrie	25	Marietta, GA	John Legend ^{L}	17	Live Playoffs
Alex Kandel	22	Nashville, TN	Gwen Stefani	9	Battle Rounds
Alex Whalen	43	Indian Rocks Beach, FL	Blake Shelton	23	Withdrew
Alexa Cappelli	18	Upland, CA	Kelly Clarkson	14	Live Playoffs
Alexa Wildish	34	Orange County, CA	Niall Horan	24	Playoffs
Alexandra Joyce	16	Wesley Chapel, FL	Jennifer Hudson	13	Battle Rounds
Alexia Jayy	31	Mobile, AL	Adam Levine	29	Winner
Alexis Marceaux	23	New Orleans, LA	CeeLo Green	3	Battle Rounds
ALI	24	Walnut, CA	Kelly Clarkson	23	Playoffs
Ali Caldwell	28	Brooklyn, NY	Miley Cyrus	11	5th/6th Place
Alisan Porter	34	Agoura Hills, CA	Christina Aguilera	10	Winner
Alison Albrecht	23	Novi, MI	Reba McEntire	24	Knockout Rounds
Alison Elena	29	Nashville, TN	Reba McEntire	26	Battle Rounds
Aliyah Khaylyn	23	Philadelphia, PA	Snoop Dogg ^{BB}	26	Playoffs
Aliyah Moulden	15	La Habra, CA	Blake Shelton	12	3rd Place
Allegra Miles	16	St. John, U.S. Virgin Islands	Nick Jonas	18	6th/7th/8th/9th Place
Allie Keck	28	Neoga, IL	Kelly Clarkson	23	Battle Rounds
Allison Bray	18	Louisville, KY	Blake Shelton	7 ^{V5}	Knockout Rounds
Alyssa Crosby	32	Binghamton, NY	Chance the Rapper ^{Y}	25	Knockout Rounds
Alyssa Lazar	24	Scranton, PA	Chance the Rapper	23	Battle Rounds
Alyssa Witrado	19	Fresno, CA	Gwen Stefani	22	11th/12th/13th Place
ALyX	19	Dallas, TX	Blake Shelton	2	Battle Rounds
Amanda Ayala	17	New York, NY	Adam Levine	9	Battle Rounds
Amanda Brown	27	Bronx, NY	Adam Levine ^{C}	3	5th/6th Place
Amanda Lee Peers	29	Rochester, NY	Gwen Stefani	7	Battle Rounds
Amber Carrington	19	Rockwall, TX	Adam Levine	4	4th/5th Place
Amber Nicole	17	Allendale, MI	CeeLo Green ^{D}	5	Live Playoffs
Amber Sauer	35	Paradise, CA	Kelly Clarkson	14	Battle Rounds
Ameera Delandro	26	Richmond, VA	Christina Aguilera	8	Battle Rounds
Amy Vachal	26	Brooklyn, NY	Adam Levine ^{G}	9	7th/8th/9th Place
Amy Whitcomb	24	Longwood, FL	Adam Levine	4	Knockout Rounds
Anatalia Villaranda	16	Temecula, CA	Alicia Keys	12	Live Playoffs
Anaya Cheyenne	16	Norwalk, CT / Atlanta, GA	Kelly Clarkson	18	Knockout Rounds
Anders Drerup	36	Ottawa, Canada	Nick Jonas	18	Battle Rounds
Andi & Alex (Andi & Alex Peot)	23/23	Green Bay, WI	Adam Levine	9	Knockout Rounds
Andrea Thomas	25	Fort Worth, TX	Blake Shelton	12	Knockout Rounds
Andrew DeMuro	25	Chicago, IL	Adam Levine	11	Battle Rounds
Andrew Igbokidi	22	Hot Springs, AR	Camila Cabello	22	Knockout Rounds
Andrew Jannakos	25	Flowery Branch, GA	Adam Levine	16	Live Cross Battle Rounds
Andrew Marshall	21	Boxford, MA	Nick Jonas ^{B2}	20	Live Playoffs
Andrew Sevener	22	Alvarado, TX	Blake Shelton	16	4th Place
Angel Bonilla	31	Quezon City/New York, NY	Adam Levine	14	Battle Rounds
Angel Taylor	23	Los Angeles, CA	Adam Levine	2	Battle Rounds
Angela Wolff	25	Metter, GA	Adam Levine	1	Battle Rounds
Angelina Nazarian	18	Ann Arbor, MI	Reba McEntire	24	Battle Rounds
Angie Johnson	31	Saint Louis, MO	CeeLo Green	2	Battle Rounds
Angie Keilhauer	24	Marietta, GA	Blake Shelton	10	Knockout Rounds
Angie Rey	25	Nashville, TN	Michael Bublé ^{CC}	27	Playoffs
Anita Antoinette	24	Boston, MA	Gwen Stefani	7 ^{V2}	9th/10th Place
Anna Catherine DeHart	23	Sikeston, MO	Blake Shelton	13	Knockout Rounds
Anna Grace Felten	20	Milwaukee, WI	Blake Shelton ^{L}	20	Live Playoffs
Ansley Burns	16	Easley, SC	Blake Shelton	22	Battle Rounds
Anthony Alexander	17	Fontana, CA	Adam Levine	13	Playoffs
Anthony Arya	15	Santa Cruz, CA	Jennifer Hudson ^{A}	15	Knockout Rounds
Anthony Evans	33	Dallas, TX	Christina Aguilera	2	Battle Rounds
Anthony Ortiz	20	Tampa, FL	Adam Levine	16	Battle Rounds
Anthony Paul	18	Twinsburg, OH	Christina Aguilera ^{C}	5	Knockout Rounds
Anthony Riley	28	Philadelphia, PA	Pharrell Williams	8	Withdrew
Antonio Ramsey	35	Boynton Beach, FL	John Legend	27	Battle Rounds ^{R}
Anya True Moore	17	Encinitas, CA	Dan + Shay	25	Playoffs
Aquile	24	San Diego, CA	Christina Aguilera	3	Knockout Rounds
Arei Moon	28	Boston, MA	Nick Jonas	18	Live Playoffs
Ari Camille	21	Chicago, IL	John Legend ^{A2}	27	Playoffs
Asher HaVon	32	Selma, AL	Reba McEntire	25	Winner
Ashland Craft	21	Piedmont, SC	Miley Cyrus	13	9th/10th Place
Ashley Bryant	26	Louisville, KY	Reba McEntire	25	Knockout Rounds
Ashley De La Rosa	17	Orlando, FL	Christina Aguilera	2	13th/14th/15th/16th Place
Ashley DuBose	23	St. Paul, MN	Adam Levine	5	Knockout Rounds
Ashley Levin	23	Miami, FL	Alicia Keys ^{B}	12	Live Playoffs
Ashley Marina	18	Pittsburgh, PA	John Legend	29	Battle Rounds
Ashley Morgan	26	Costa Mesa, CA	Christina Aguilera ^{G}	8	Knockout Rounds
Aubrey Nicole	20	Littlestown, PA	Reba McEntire	28	4th Place ^{N3}
Audra McLaughlin	21	Philadelphia, PA	Blake Shelton	6	6th/7th/8th Place
Audrey Karrasch	20	Reno, NV	Usher	4	Knockout Rounds
Audri Bartholomew	19	St. Louis, MO	Jennifer Hudson	15	Battle Rounds
Austin Allsup	32	Fort Worth, TX	Blake Shelton	11	9th/10th Place
Austin Ellis	26	North Beach, MD	Adam Levine	6	Battle Rounds
Austin Gilbert	25	Eugene, OR	Reba McEntire ^{BB}	28	Knockout Rounds
Austin Giorgio	21	Rochester, NY	Blake Shelton	14	Live Playoffs ^{N}
Austin Jenckes	25	Duvall, WA	Blake Shelton	5	9th/10th Place
Austin Montgomery	19	Hemet, CA	Blake Shelton	22	Knockout Rounds
Austyns Stancil	34	Oakland, CA	Snoop Dogg ^{H}	26	Playoffs
Autumn Turner	25	Montclair, NJ	Adam Levine ^{K}	12	Knockout Rounds
Ava Nat	18	Garden City, NY	Niall Horan	28	Playoffs ^{N3}
Ava Lynn Thuresson	18	Santa Barbara, CA	Camila Cabello	22	Battle Rounds
Avery Roberson	20	Rutherfordton, NC	Kelly Clarkson ^{B}	20	Knockout Rounds
Avery Wilson	16	Hamden, CT	CeeLo Green	3	Knockout Rounds
Awari	35	Virginia Beach, VA	Nick Jonas	20	Battle Rounds
Ayanna Jahneé	20	Nashville, TN	Christina Aguilera	10	Battle Rounds
Ayanna Joni	29	Yonkers, NY	Kelsea Ballerini	15	Live Playoffs
AZÁN	28	Austin, TX	John Legend ^{W2}	24	10th/11th/12th Place ^{I2}
Aziz Guerra	20	El Paso, TX	Adam Levine	29	Battle Rounds
Bailey Rae	18	Roberta, OK	John Legend	19	6th/7th/8th/9th Place
Barrett Baber	35	Fayetteville, AR	Blake Shelton	9	3rd Place
Barry Black	27	Las Vegas, NV	Adam Levine	5	Battle Rounds
Barry Jean Fontenot	31	Chicago, IL	Michael Bublé	27	Playoffs ^{N3}
Barry Minniefield	52	Fort Wayne, IN	Adam Levine	8	Knockout Rounds
Bay Brooks	17	Valdosta, GA	Blake Shelton	8	Battle Rounds
Bay Simpson	26	Muscle Shoals, AL	Adam Levine	29	Knockout Rounds
BD.ii	31	Hampton, VA	John Legend	27	Playoffs
Beat Frequency (Shawn Lewis & Natasha Neuschwander)	35/28	Vancouver, WA	Christina Aguilera	3	Battle Rounds
Bella DeNapoli	22	West Islip, NY	Ariana Grande	21	Live Playoffs ^{N3}
Belle Jewel	18	Brooklyn, NY	Miley Cyrus ^{K}	11	Live Playoffs
Ben Allen	42	Estero, FL	Gwen Stefani ^{B}	19	6th/7th/8th/9th Place
Ben Taub	21	Princeton, NJ	CeeLo Green	3	Battle Rounds
Benji	24	Orlando, FL	Adam Levine	3	Battle Rounds
Benny Weag	29	Lake County, MT	Blake Shelton	22	Battle Rounds
Berritt Haynes	19	Pell City, AL	Blake Shelton	21	Knockout Rounds
Beth Griffith-Manley	46	Detroit, MI	John Legend ^{L}	16	Live Cross Battle Rounds
Beth Spangler	30	Aiken, SC	Gwen Stefani ^{A}	7	Knockout Rounds
Betsy Ade	40	Kenosha, WI	Adam Levine ^{P} ^{L2}	16	Live Playoffs
Beverly McClellan	41	Fort Lauderdale, FL	Christina Aguilera	1	3rd/4th Place
BEYA	24	Kauai, HI	Gwen Stefani	26	Battle Rounds
BIAS	23	Little Rock, AR	Gwen Stefani	24	6th/7th/8th/9th Place
Biff Gore	45	Denver, CO	Blake Shelton ^{F}	6	Battle Rounds
Bijou Belle	17	Rapid City, SD	Adam Levine	29	Battle Rounds
Billy Gilman	28	Richmond, RI	Adam Levine	11	Runner-up
Bindi Liebowitz	23	Plainfield, NJ	Blake Shelton ^{A}	11	Knockout Rounds
Blaine Long	40	Chandler, AZ	Blake Shelton	11	Battle Rounds
Blaine Mitchell	24	Fort Worth, TX	Adam Levine ^{B}	9	Live Playoffs
Blaire Elbert	28	Lubbock, TX	Kelly Clarkson	29	Battle Rounds
Blaze Johnson	23	Columbus, OH	Adam Levine	8	Knockout Rounds
Blessing Offor	25	New York, NY	Adam Levine ^{G}	7	Knockout Rounds
Blind Joe	33	Fargo, ND	Blake Shelton	9	Knockout Rounds
bodie	29	Los Angeles, CA	Blake Shelton	22	Runner-up
Brad Sample	38	Nashville, TN	Snoop Dogg	26	Battle Rounds
Bradley Sinclair	22	Nashville, TN/Rockford, MI	Nick Jonas	20	Battle Rounds
Braiden Sunshine	14	Old Lyme, CT	Gwen Stefani	9	7th/8th/9th Place
Brailey Lenderman	33	Roswell, GA	Niall Horan	24	Battle Rounds
Brandon Brown	19	Bronx, NY	Adam Levine	13	Battle Rounds
Brandon Chase	20	Arlington, TX	Blake Shelton	5	Knockout Rounds
Brandon Mahone	17	Chicago, IL	Adam Levine	3	Battle Rounds
Brandon Montel	29	Memphis, TN	John Legend ^{H}	24	Knockout Rounds
Brandon Roush	19	Louisville, KY	Shakira	4	Battle Rounds
Brandon Royal	31	Saint Thomas, U.S. Virgin Islands	Gwen Stefani	12	Knockout Rounds
Brandon Showell	26	Virginia Beach, VA	Adam Levine	13	Battle Rounds
Bransen Ireland	27	Tulsa, OK	Blake Shelton	14	Battle Rounds
Braxton Garza	28	Adrian, MI	Michael Bublé	27	Battle Rounds
Brayden Lape	16	Grass Lake, MI	Blake Shelton	22	5th Place
Bree Fondacaro	24	Orange, CA	Blake Shelton	7	Battle Rounds
Bren'nae DeBarge	22	Anchorage, AK	Adam Levine	8	Battle Rounds
Brendan Fletcher	26	Brooklyn, NY	Adam Levine	11	7th/8th Place
Brenna Yaeger	19	Spokane, WA	Blake Shelton	8	Battle Rounds
Brennan Lassiter	20	Dacusville, SC	Kelly Clarkson	17	Battle Rounds
Brennen Henson	20	Flint, MI	Gwen Stefani	17	Battle Rounds
Brennley Brown	14	Philadelphia, PA	Gwen Stefani ^{B}	12	5th/6th Place
Brett Hunter	33	Pittsburgh, PA	Blake Shelton	14	Battle Rounds
Bri Fletcher	28	Fort Worth, TX	Chance the Rapper	25	Battle Rounds
Bria Kelly	17	Smithfield, VA	Usher	6	9th/10th Place
Brian Fuente	24	Nashville, TN	Blake Shelton	2	Battle Rounds
Brian Johnson	24	Cleveland, OH	Adam Levine ^{B}	8	11th/12th Place
Brian Nhira	23	Tulsa, OK	Adam Levine ^{G}	10	Live Playoffs
Brian Pounds	24	Austin, TX	Blake Shelton	5	Battle Rounds
Brian Scartocci	26	Austin, TX	Adam Levine	3	Battle Rounds
Briana Cuoco	24	Los Angeles, CA	Blake Shelton ^{D}	5	Knockout Rounds
Briar Jonnee	20	Shuqualak, MS	Pharrell Williams	8	Battle Rounds
Brittany Bree	26	Dallas, TX	John Legend	21	Knockout Rounds
Brittany Butler	21	Boston, MA	Pharrell Williams	7	Battle Rounds
Brittany Kennell	29	Nashville, TN	Blake Shelton	10	Knockout Rounds
Brittnee Camelle	23	Lawrenceville, GA	Adam Levine ^{F}	6	Battle Rounds
Brittney Allen	28	Columbus, GA	John Legend	18	Battle Rounds
Brittney Lawrence	21	Jacksonville, FL	Blake Shelton	10	Battle Rounds
Britton Buchanan	17	Sanford, NC	Alicia Keys	14	Runner-up
Britton Moore	21	San Antonio, TX	Adam Levine	27	Playoffs
Brook Wood	33	Indianapolis, IN	Kelsea Ballerini	27	Battle Rounds
Brooke Adee	16	Atlanta, GA	Blake Shelton	8	Live Playoffs
Brooke Simpson	26	Hollister, NC	Miley Cyrus	13	3rd Place
Brooke Stephenson	28	Bolton, CT	Kelly Clarkson	17	Battle Rounds
Brothers Walker (Coty & Clinton Walker)	26	Bernie, MO	Usher	6	Battle Rounds
Bryan Bautista	23	Brooklyn, NY	Christina Aguilera	10 ^{V7}	5th/6th Place
Bryan Keith	22	Bronx, NY	Adam Levine	3	9th/10th Place
Bryan Olesen	49	Lincoln, NE	John Legend	25	3rd Place ^{N4}
Bryana Salaz	16	San Antonio, TX	Gwen Stefani	7	Live Playoffs
Bryce Leatherwood	22	Woodstock, GA	Blake Shelton	22	Winner
Brynn Cartelli	15	Longmeadow, MA	Kelly Clarkson	14	Winner
Bryson Battle	21	Harrisburg, NC	John Legend	27	6th/7th/8th Place
C. Perkins	19	New Orleans, LA	Usher ^{E}	4	Knockout Rounds
Caeland Garner	31	Coleridge, NC	Blake Shelton	15	Battle Rounds
Caitlin Caporale	23	Newburgh, NY	Pharrell Williams	8	Live Playoffs
Caitlin Michelle	20	Boston, MA	CeeLo Green ^{A}	3	Knockout Rounds
Caitlin Quisenberry	27	Denver, CO	Reba McEntire	24	Knockout Rounds
Caitlyn Martin	32	Atlanta, GA	Kelly Clarkson	23	Playoffs
Caity Peters	22	Long Beach, CA	Pharrell Williams	10	Live Playoffs
Caleb Elder	19	Appomattox, VA	Adam Levine	6	Battle Rounds
Caleb Sasser	27	Goldsboro, NC	John Legend	24	Knockout Rounds
Cali Tucker	29	Nashville, TN	Blake Shelton	6	Battle Rounds
Cali Wilson	28	Salem, IA	Blake Shelton	17	12th/13th Place
Calla Prejean	22	Houston, TX	Gwen Stefani	24	Battle Rounds
Calvin Lockett	25	Durham, NC	Gwen Stefani	17	Knockout Rounds
Cam Anthony	19	North Philly, PA	Blake Shelton	20	Winner
Cam Spinks	29	Alabaster, AL	Blake Shelton	18	Knockout Rounds
Cameron Wright	34	Minneapolis, MN	Michael Bublé	26	Playoffs
Cami Clune	20	Buffalo, NY	Kelly Clarkson ^{P}	19	6th/7th/8th/9th Place
Camille Tredoux	26	Johannesburg, South Africa	Niall Horan	28	Battle Rounds
CammWess	22	Blythewood, SC	John Legend ^{L2}	18	4th Place
Camryn Brooks	24	Mount Shasta, CA	Gwen Stefani	26 ^{V16}	Knockout Rounds
Cara Brindisi	34	Shrewsbury, MA	Gwen Stefani	22	Knockout Rounds
Carlos Rising	28	Wilmington, NC	Blake Shelton	23	Battle Rounds
Carlos Santiago	35	Caguas, Puerto Rico	Michael Bublé	27	Knockout Rounds
Carly Harvey	39	Washington, D.C.	Michael Bublé	28	Battle Rounds
Carolina Alonso	23	Reno, NV	Kelly Clarkson	21	Battle Rounds
Carolina Rial	17	Ridgefield, NJ	John Legend	20	Knockout Rounds ^{N3}
Carolina Rodriguez	19	Miami, FL	Snoop Dogg ^{W}	28	Knockout Rounds
Caroline Burns	15	Hollis, NH	Adam Levine	10 ^{V7}	Live Playoffs
Caroline Glaser	18	Chesterfield, MO	Adam Levine ^{B}	4	Live Playoffs
Caroline Pennell	17	Saddle River, NJ	CeeLo Green	5	7th/8th Place
Caroline Reilly	16	Cumming, GA	Gwen Stefani	17	Battle Rounds
Caroline Sky	16	San Anselmo, CA	Blake Shelton ^{H}	12	Knockout Rounds
Carson Peters	17	Piney Flats, TN	Blake Shelton	21	Knockout Rounds
Carter Lloyd Horne	19	Marietta, GA	Blake Shelton	16	7th/8th Place
Carter Rubin	15	Shoreham, NY	Gwen Stefani	19	Winner
Cary Laine	28	Citronelle, AL	Adam Levine	6	Battle Rounds
Casey Desmond	25	Boston, MA	Adam Levine	1	Battle Rounds
Casey Muesiggman	22	Spencer, IA	Blake Shelton	3	Battle Rounds
Casey Weston	18	Naples, FL	Adam Levine	1	5th/6th/7th/8th Place
Casi Joy	26	Kansas City, MO	Blake Shelton	12	Live Playoffs
Casmè	39	New Orleans, LA	John Legend	19	Knockout Rounds
Cassadee Pope	23	West Palm Beach, FL	Blake Shelton	3	Winner
Cassandra Robertson	45	Dallas, TX	Adam Levine	9	Battle Rounds
Cassidy Lee	28	Jacksonville, FL	Reba McEntire ^{BB}	26 ^{V13}	Knockout Rounds
Cáthia	19	New York, NY	Usher ^{E}	4	Live Playoffs
Cecily Hennigan	16	Conway, SC	Blake Shelton	16	Battle Rounds
Cedrice	28	San Diego, CA	Kelly Clarkson ^{P} ^{B2}	18	Live Playoffs
Celeste Betton	27	Hinesville, GA	Pharrell Williams	9	Live Playoffs ^{I}
Celia Babini	17	New York, NY	John Legend ^{A}	16	11th/12th/13th Place
Celica Westbrook	16	Franklin, TN	Christina Aguilera	3	Knockout Rounds
Chance Peña	15	Tyler, TX	Adam Levine ^{B2}	9	Live Playoffs ^{I2}
Charity Bowden	16	Hope Hull, AL	Miley Cyrus	11	Battle Rounds
Charlie Rey	21	Long Beach, CA	Blake Shelton	3	Battle Rounds
Charlotte Sometimes	23	Wall, NJ	Blake Shelton	2	21st/22nd/23rd/24th Place
Chase Kerby	30	Oklahoma City, OK	Gwen Stefani	9	Battle Rounds
Chavon Rodgers	23	Ada, OK	Ariana Grande	21	Battle Rounds
Chechi Serai	32	Pontiac, MI	Gwen Stefani	24	Knockout Rounds
Cheesa	21	Honolulu, HI	CeeLo Green	2	9th/10th/11th/12th Place
Chelle	18	Bargersville, IN	Kelly Clarkson	18	Battle Rounds
Chello	22	Chester, PA	Camila Cabello	22	Knockout Rounds
Chelsea Gann	27	Mounds, OK	Christina Aguilera	10	Battle Rounds
Chelsea M	20	Springfield, VA	Usher	4	Battle Rounds
Cherie Oakley	29	Nashville, TN	Christina Aguilera	1	Battle Rounds
Chevel Shepherd	16	Farmington, NM	Kelly Clarkson	15	Winner
Chevonne	26	Little Falls, NJ	Christina Aguilera ^{C}	3	Knockout Rounds
Chloe Abbott	24	Detroit, MI	Chance the Rapper	23	Battle Rounds
Chloé Hogan	20	Orlando, FL	John Legend ^{H}	19	Live Playoffs
Chloe Kohanski	23	Nashville, TN	Blake Shelton ^{J}	13	Winner
Chris Blue	26	Knoxville, TN	Alicia Keys	12	Winner
Chris Cauley	27	Atlanta, GA	Adam Levine	2	Battle Rounds
Chris Crump	31	Baytown, TX	Blake Shelton	9	Knockout Rounds
Chris Jamison	20	Pittsburgh, PA	Adam Levine	7	3rd Place
Chris Kroeze	27	Barron, WI	Blake Shelton	15	Runner-up ^{N}
Chris Mann	29	Wichita, KS	Christina Aguilera	2	4th Place
Chris Weaver	29	Long Island, NY	Jennifer Hudson	13	Playoffs
ChrisDeo	17	Queens, NY	Snoop Dogg	26	Knockout Rounds
Christian Cuevas	20	Orlando, FL	Alicia Keys	11	5th/6th Place
Christian Fermin	20	Buena Park, CA	Blake Shelton	11	Battle Rounds
Christian Porter	20	Stroudsburg, PA	Blake Shelton	4	Battle Rounds
Christiana Danielle	21	Fort Wayne, IN	Alicia Keys	14	9th/10th Place ^{N}
Christina Eagle	23	Catawba, NC	Snoop Dogg	26	6th/7th/8th Place ^{N}
Christina Grimmie	19	Marlton, NJ	Adam Levine	6	3rd Place
Christine Cain	27	Pasadena, CA	John Legend	20	Battle Rounds
Ciana Pelekai	20	Oahu, HI/Las Vegas, NV	John Legend	20	Knockout Rounds
Ciera Dumas	21	Kernersville, NC	Bebe Rexha ^{A}	16	Comeback Stage ^{Q}
Cierra Mickens	23	Eagle River, AK	Usher ^{E}	6	Battle Rounds
Cilla Chan	22	San Jose, CA	Blake Shelton	5	Battle Rounds
Claire DeJean	17	Dallas, TX	Kelly Clarkson	15	Knockout Rounds
Claire Heilig	30	Virginia Beach, VA	Gwen Stefani	24	Battle Rounds
Clara Hong	22	Atlanta, GA	Adam Levine	7	Battle Rounds
Clarissa Serna	27	Corpus Christi, TX	Shakira	6	Battle Rounds
Claudia B.	25	Washington, D.C.	Niall Horan ^{P}	24	Playoffs ^{N}
Clint Sherman	26	Heath, TX	Blake Shelton	21	Battle Rounds
Clinton Washington	26	Little Rock, AR	Adam Levine ^{D}	8	Knockout Rounds
Cody Belew	27	Beebe, AR	CeeLo Green	3	7th/8th Place
Cody Ray Raymond	27	Seattle, WA	Kelly Clarkson	15	Withdrew
Cody Wickline	20	Beckley, WV	Blake Shelton	8	Knockout Rounds
Cole Criske	16	Temecula, CA	Blake Shelton	9	Battle Rounds
Cole Vosbury	22	Shreveport, LA	Blake Shelton ^{C}	5	4th/5th Place
Collin McLoughlin	24	Bedford, NY	Blake Shelton ^{A}	3	Knockout Rounds
Colton Smith	21	Albertville, AL	Jennifer Hudson ^{B2}	15	Live Playoffs
Connor Christian	23	Gallipolis, OH	Blake Shelton	20	Knockout Rounds
Conor James	28	Bridgewater, MA	Adam Levine	27	9th/10th/11th/12th Place ^{I3}
Conrad Khalil	28	Newark, NJ	Reba McEntire	28	Knockout Rounds
Constance Howard	28	Katy, TX	Camila Cabello	22	Battle Rounds
Corey Curtis	22	Summerville, GA	Chance the Rapper	25	Battle Rounds
Corey Kent White	20	Bixby, OK	Blake Shelton	8	7th/8th Place
Corey Ward	34	Hartsville, SC	Kelly Clarkson	20 ^{V14}	6th/7th/8th/9th Place
Cori Kennedy	28	Kasson, MN	Reba McEntire	28	Knockout Rounds
CORii	33	Moorestown, NJ	Gwen Stefani ^{Y}	24	Knockout Rounds
Cory Jackson	24	Jonesboro, AR	Blake Shelton	17	Battle Rounds
Courtney Harrell	36	Los Angeles, CA	Blake Shelton	11	9th/10th Place
Courtnie Ramirez	17	Bryan, TX	Alicia Keys ^{J}	11	Knockout Rounds
Cozy Len	43	Baton Rouge, LA	Gwen Stefani	26	Battle Rounds
Craig Wayne Boyd	35	Nashville, TN	Blake Shelton ^{H2}	7	Winner
Creigh Riepe	32	Nashville, TN	Reba McEntire	26	Battle Rounds
Crystal Nicole	39	Atlanta, GA	Reba McEntire	24	Battle Rounds
Crystal Rose	26	Kansas City, MO	Bebe Rexha	16	Comeback Stage
Curtis Grimes	25	Gilmer, TX	CeeLo Green	1	9th/10th/11th/12th Place
D.R. King	34	Strongsville, OH	Kelly Clarkson	14	12th Place
D.Smooth	25	Birmingham, AL	Kelly Clarkson	23	3rd Place ^{N4}
Dallas Caroline	17	Santa Rosa, CA	Alicia Keys ^{B}	14	Knockout Rounds
Dalton Dover	20	Aragon, GA	Blake Shelton	16	Battle Rounds
Damali	16	Norwalk, CA	Kelly Clarkson	17	Live Playoffs
Damien	35	Monroe, LA	Adam Levine	7	4th Place
Dan Kiernan	33	New York City, NY	Kelsea Ballerini	27	Knockout Rounds
Dan Shafer	56	Mount Juliet, TN	Blake Shelton	11	Battle Rounds
Dana Harper	25	Dallas, TX	Blake Shelton	11	Live Playoffs
Dana Monique	41	Houston, TX	Nick Jonas	20	6th/7th/8th/9th Place
Dane & Stephanie (Dane & Stephanie Mautone)	21	Bloomfield, NJ	John Legend	17	Battle Rounds
Dani Moz	26	Los Angeles, CA	Shakira	6	11th/12th Place
Dani Stacy	31	Hanford, CA	Chance the Rapper	25	Knockout Rounds
DaNica Shirey	25	York, PA	Pharrell Williams	7	6th/7th/8th Place
Daniel Passino	21	New Boston, MI	Pharrell Williams ^{D}	10	10th Place ^{I2}
Daniel Rosa	21	Riverside, CA	CeeLo Green	3 ^{V}	Knockout Rounds
Danielle Bradbery	16	Cypress, TX	Blake Shelton	4	Winner
Danny Joseph	37	Dallas, TX	Reba McEntire	26	4th Place ^{N}
Darby Walker	17	Burbank, CA	Miley Cyrus	11	11th Place
Daria Jazmin	20	Los Angeles, CA	Pharrell Williams	9	Battle Rounds
Darious Lyles	30	Chicago, IL	John Legend	18	Knockout Rounds
Darius J.	35	Pahokee, FL	Kelsea Ballerini ^{A}	27	Playoffs ^{N3}
Darius Scott	23	Dallas, TX	Pharrell Williams	9	Live Playoffs
Daron Lameek	35	Queens, NY	Reba McEntire	28	Battle Rounds
Dave Crosby	30	Seattle, WA	Adam Levine	13	Battle Rounds
Dave Fenley	39	Nashville, TN	Blake Shelton	15	9th/10th Place
Dave Moisan	33	Louisville, KY	Adam Levine ^{K}	11	Knockout Rounds
David Andrew	25	Gallatin, TN	John Legend	22	Battle Rounds
David Owens	24	Indianapolis, IN	Bebe Rexha ^{L}	16	Comeback Stage ^{Q}
David Vogel	23	Valhalla, NY	John Legend ^{T}	21	Live Playoffs
Davina Leone	24	Miami, FL	Adam Levine ^{H}	12	Knockout Rounds
Davon Fleming	25	Baltimore, MD	Jennifer Hudson	13	7th/8th Place
Davison	23	Little Rock, AR	Adam Levine	14	Battle Rounds
Dawn and Hawkes (Miranda Dawn & Chris Hawkes)	30/32	Austin, TX	Adam Levine	6	Battle Rounds
Dawson Coyle	17	Williamstown, NJ	Alicia Keys ^{B}	12	Knockout Rounds
Daysia Reneau	17	Leavenworth, KS	Gwen Stefani	22	Knockout Rounds
Ddendyl	25	Washington, D.C.	Shakira	6	Battle Rounds
De'Borah	25	Chicago Heights, IL	Christina Aguilera	3	Live Playoffs
DeAndre Nico	22	Port Arthur, TX	Adam Levine	15	9th/10th Place
Deanna Johnson	18	Hazlehurst, GA	Adam Levine	8 ^{V4}	9th/10th Place
Deejay Young	33	Tampa, FL	John Legend	24	Knockout Rounds
Deion Warren	28	Conway, NC	John Legend	20	Battle Rounds
Deja Hall	16	San Antonio, TX	Shakira	6	Playoffs
DEK of Hearts (Dylan Kelly, Emily Clapp, and Kollin Bailey)	24-25	Nashville, TN	Niall Horan	28	3rd Place
Delaney Silvernell	21	Los Angeles, CA	Adam Levine ^{L}	15	Knockout Rounds
Delvin Choice	24	Greenville, SC	Adam Levine	6 ^{V4}	6th/7th/8th Place
Denisha Dalton	22	Warwick, NY	John Legend	20	Battle Rounds
Dennis Drummond	27	Nashville, TN	Adam Levine ^{B}	13	Knockout Rounds
Denton Arnell	32	Chicago, IL	John Legend	16	Battle Rounds
Deon Jones	32	Los Angeles, CA	Gwen Stefani ^{Y}	26	Knockout Rounds
DeShawn Washington	23	Natchitoches, LA	Shakira	6	Battle Rounds
Destinee Quinn	20	Surprise, AZ	Christina Aguilera	5	Knockout Rounds
Destiny Leigh	19	Sofia, Bulgaria	Gwen Stefani	22	Knockout Rounds ^{N3}
Destiny Rayne	23	Coral Springs, FL	Gwen Stefani ^{P}	17	Knockout Rounds
DeSz	30	Houston, TX	Kelly Clarkson	19	4th Place
Devan Blake Jones	35	Denver, CO	Nick Jonas	20	Live Playoffs ^{N3}
Devix	28	Queens, NY	Camila Cabello	22	11th/12th/13th Place
Devon Barley	19	Mattapoisett, MA	Adam Levine	1	9th/10th/11th/12th Place
Devyn DeLoera	20	Snyder, TX	Christina Aguilera	3	Live Playoffs
Dexter Roberts	27	Fayette, AL	Blake Shelton	16	3rd Place
Dez Duron	22	Shreveport, LA	Christina Aguilera	3 ^{V}	7th/8th Place
Dia Frampton	23	St. George, UT	Blake Shelton	1	Runner-up
Dia Malai	26	Queens, NY	John Legend	22	Battle Rounds
Diego Val	25	Lima	CeeLo Green	3	Live Playoffs
Dimitrius Graham	33	Baltimore, MD	Michael Bublé	27	Battle Rounds
Divighn	33	Gardena, CA	Michael Bublé	27	Knockout Rounds
Domenic Haynes	18	Tampa, FL	Adam Levine	16	Live Playoffs ^{N2}
DOMO	26	Bronx, NY	CeeLo Green	3	Battle Rounds
Donna Allen	54	Hollywood, FL	Adam Levine	5	Battle Rounds
Donny Van Slee	30	Weeki Wachee, FL	Reba McEntire	25	Battle Rounds
DREION	27	Omaha, NE	Snoop Dogg	26	Battle Rounds
Drew Cole	25	Los Angeles, CA	Adam Levine	14	Live Playoffs ^{N}
Drew Russell	32	Los Angeles, CA	Adam Levine	29	Battle Rounds
Ducote Talmage	20	Auburn, AL	Dan + Shay	25	Knockout Rounds
Duncan Kamakana	25	Oahu, HI	Adam Levine	4	Battle Rounds
Durell Anthony	34	San Diego, CA	John Legend	20	Battle Rounds
Dustin Christensen	33	Orem, UT	Adam Levine ^{B}	9	Knockout Rounds
Dustin Dale Gaspard	33	Cow Island, LA	Niall Horan	28	Knockout Rounds
Dustin Monk	27	Jacksonville, FL	Adam Levine	9	Battle Rounds
Dylan Carter	20	St. George, SC	Reba McEntire	24	Battle Rounds
Dylan Gerard	28	Macclenny, FL	Adam Levine	13	Knockout Rounds
Dylan Hartigan	21	Wyckoff, NJ	Kelly Clarkson ^{B2}	14	Live Playoffs
E.G. Daily	51	Hollywood, CA	Blake Shelton	5	Knockout Rounds
Edward Preble	19	Fernandina Beach, FL	Reba McEntire ^{BB}	26	Playoffs
EJ Michels	31	Draper, UT	Niall Horan ^{B}	23	Knockout Rounds
Ele Ivory	20	Nashville, TN	Kelsea Ballerini	15	Comeback Stage
Elenowen (Josh & Nicole Johnson)	23/24	Nashville, TN	Blake Shelton	1	Battle Rounds
Eli Ward	21	Waterloo, IL	Gwen Stefani	24	Battle Rounds
Eli Zamora	25	El Paso, TX	Kelly Clarkson	19	Battle Rounds
Elia Esparza	23	El Paso, TX	Adam Levine	11	Battle Rounds
Elias Gomez	29	Cincinnati, OH	Michael Bublé	28	Battle Rounds
Elise Azkoul	28	Atlanta, GA	Gwen Stefani	17	Battle Rounds
Eliza Pryor	17	Dallas, TX	Snoop Dogg	26	Battle Rounds
Elizabeth Evans	22	Arlington, TX	Reba McEntire ^{P}	24	Knockout Rounds
Ellie Lawrence	26	Calhoun, GA	Gwen Stefani	9	Live Playoffs ^{I2}
EllieMae	21	Jerome, ID	Blake Shelton	17	Battle Rounds
Elyjuh Rene	18	Long Beach, CA	Pharrell Williams	7	Live Playoffs
Elyscia Jefferson	20	Baltimore, MD	Reba McEntire	25	Battle Rounds
Emily Ann Roberts	16	Knoxville, TN	Blake Shelton	9	Runner-up
Emily B.	33	American Falls, ID	Shakira	6	Battle Rounds
Emily Earle	23	Brooklyn, NY	CeeLo Green	3	Battle Rounds
Emily Hough	16	Petersburg, IL	Adam Levine	15	Battle Rounds
Emily Keener	16	Wakeman, OH	Pharrell Williams	10	12th Place
Emily Luther	24	Woonsocket, RI	Adam Levine	13	Playoffs
Emily Randolph	15	Tacoma, WA	Blake Shelton	5	Battle Rounds
Emily Valentine	23	Hollywood, CA	CeeLo Green	1	Battle Rounds
Emma Brooke	19	Lyman, SC	John Legend	22	Knockout Rounds
Emma Caroline	25	Tuscaloosa, AL	Blake Shelton	20	Knockout Rounds ^{N3}
Emmalee	20	Kings Mountain, NC	Kelly Clarkson	19	Battle Rounds
Emmanuel Rey	27	Inglewood, CA	Snoop Dogg	28	Battle Rounds
Enid Ortiz	25	Tampa, FL	Blake Shelton	12	Knockout Rounds
Ephraim Owens	36	Indianapolis, IN	John Legend	24	Battle Rounds
Eric Lyn	26	Los Angeles, CA	Jennifer Hudson	13	Knockout Rounds
Eric Who	22	Orangeburg, SC	Camila Cabello	22	11th/12th/13th Place
Erika Zade	20	Miami, FL	Kelly Clarkson	15	Battle Rounds
Erin Martin	27	Chicago	CeeLo Green	2	17th/18th/19th/20th Place
Erin Willett	22	Gaithersburg, MD	Blake Shelton	2	5th/6th/7th/8th Place
Esera Tuaolo	49	Minneapolis, MN	Blake Shelton	13	Playoffs
Ethan Butler	25	Chicago, IL	Adam Levine	7	Battle Rounds
Ethan Eckenroad	27	Roaring Spring, PA	Adam Levine	27	Playoffs
Ethan Lively	17	Coalfield, TN	Blake Shelton	20	Knockout Rounds
Ethan Tucker	26	Olympia, WA	Blake Shelton	11	Battle Rounds
Eva Ullmann	22	Ponte Vedra Beach, FL	Blake Shelton	22	Knockout Rounds
Evan McKeel	20	Richmond, VA	Pharrell Williams	9	11th Place
Felicia Temple	28	Teaneck, NJ	Blake Shelton ^{K}	12	Live Playoffs
Fernanda Bosch	17	Miami, FL	Blake Shelton	7	Battle Rounds
Fran Posla	25	New York City, NY	Adam Levine	27	Battle Rounds
Franc West	38	Cleveland, OH	Jennifer Hudson	15	Live Playoffs
Frank Garcia	19	Roma, TX	Dan + Shay	25	Knockout Rounds
Frankie Torres	24	Minnetonka, MN	Reba McEntire ^{H}	26	Knockout Rounds
Frenchie Davis	31	Los Angeles, CA	Christina Aguilera	1	5th/6th/7th/8th Place
Fousheé	29	Harlem, NY	Adam Levine	15	Battle Rounds
Funsho	29	Lagos/Los Angeles, CA	Blake Shelton ^{A}	15	Live Playoffs
Gabe Broussard	15	Lafayette, LA	Blake Shelton	11	Knockout Rounds
Gabriel Goes	21	Honolulu, HI	Chance the Rapper	25	Battle Rounds
Gabriel Violett	30	New York, NY	Alicia Keys	11	Battle Rounds
Gabriel Wolfchild	26	Seattle, WA	Christina Aguilera	8	Battle Rounds
Gabrielle Zabosky	25	Oxford, PA	Gwen Stefani	26	Playoffs
Gaby Borromeo	22	Seattle, WA	Adam Levine	12	Battle Rounds
Gail Bliss	61	Little River, SC	Snoop Dogg	26	Battle Rounds ^{R}
Garrett Gardner	17	Ringwood, NJ	Shakira	4 ^{V2}	11th/12th Place
Gary Carpentier	26	Oswego, NY	Adam Levine	13	Battle Rounds
Gary Edwards	26	Dallas, TX	Blake Shelton ^{A}	14	Live Playoffs
Gean Garcia	19	McAllen, TX	John Legend ^{L}	20	Knockout Rounds
Gene Taylor	33	Vernon, NJ	John Legend	25	Knockout Rounds
Genesis Diaz	18	Miami, FL	Adam Levine	14	Battle Rounds
Geoff McBride	51	Santa Rosa Beach, FL	Christina Aguilera	2	Battle Rounds
George Horga Jr.	19	Portland, OR	CeeLo Green	5	Knockout Rounds
Georgia Starnes	22	Dallas, TX	Snoop Dogg	26	Knockout Rounds
Gianna Salvato	18	Freehold Township, NJ	Gwen Stefani	7	Battle Rounds
Gigi Hess	22	Lovington, NM	Kelly Clarkson	18	Battle Rounds
Gihanna Zoë	17	Redlands, CA	Kelly Clarkson	20	6th/7th/8th/9th Place
Gina Castanzo	18	West Chester, PA	Blake Shelton	10	Battle Rounds
Gina Miles	18	Paxton, IL	Niall Horan	23	Winner
Girl Named Tom (Joshua, Bekah Grace, and Caleb Liechty)	20-26	Pettisville, OH	Kelly Clarkson	21	Winner
Grace Askew	26	Memphis, TN	Blake Shelton	4	Knockout Rounds
Grace Bello	21	Cibolo, TX	Camila Cabello	22	Battle Rounds
Grace Humphries	18	Austin, TX	John Legend	29	Knockout Rounds
Grace Miller Moody	20	Florence, SC	Adam Levine	27	Knockout Rounds
Grace West	19	Canton, MI	Blake Shelton	23	Runner-up
Gracee Shriver	17	Owasso, OK	Blake Shelton ^{L}	17	Live Playoffs
Gracia Harrison	18	Virden, IL	Blake Shelton	3	Knockout Rounds
Grant Ganzer	16	Johnston, IA	Blake Shelton	7	Knockout Rounds
Grey	25	Jacksonville, FL	Adam Levine	5	Live Playoffs
Griffin	23	Greenville, SC	Blake Shelton ^{G}	7	Knockout Rounds
Gwen Sebastian	37	Hebron, ND	Blake Shelton	2	Battle Rounds
Gymani	23	East Point, GA	Kelly Clarkson	21	11th Place
Gyth Rigdon	24	Singer, LA	Blake Shelton	16	Runner-up
Hailey Green	15	St. Martin, MS	Blake Shelton	21 ^{V14}	Knockout Rounds
Hailey Mia	14	Clifton, NJ	Kelly Clarkson ^{T}	21	4th Place
Hailey Wright	19	Redwater, TX	Kelsea Ballerini	27	Knockout Rounds ^{N3}
Halle Tomlinson	18	Boulder, CO	Alicia Keys	11	Battle Rounds
Halley Greg	29	Seattle, WA	Kelly Clarkson	20	Battle Rounds
Hanna Ashbrook	23	Mount Prospect, IL	Gwen Stefani	9	Battle Rounds
Hanna Eyre	15	Laguna Niguel, CA	Adam Levine	12	Live Playoffs
Hannah Goebel	21	Nashville, TN	Kelly Clarkson	14	Withdrew
Hannah Huston	24	Lincoln, NE	Pharrell Williams	10	3rd Place
Hannah Kay	18	Magnolia, TX	Blake Shelton	16	Battle Rounds
Hannah Kirby	20	Sulphur Springs, TX	Blake Shelton ^{G2}	8	7th/8th Place
Hannah Mrozak	18	Richfield, WI	Jennifer Hudson ^{A}	13	Playoffs
Hayden Grove	31	Strongsville, OH	Adam Levine	27	Battle Rounds
Hello Sunday (Myla Finks & Chelsea Grover)	14	Atlanta, GA	Kelly Clarkson	17	5th/6th Place
Hillary Torchiana	34	West Chester, PA	Blake Shelton	22	Battle Rounds
Holly Brand	22	Meridian, MS	Kelly Clarkson	23	6th/7th/8th Place
Holly Forbes	30	Catlettsburg, KY	Ariana Grande ^{L}	21	9th/10th Place
Holly Henry	19	Minneapolis, MN	Blake Shelton	5	Knockout Rounds
Holly Tucker	19	Waco, TX	Blake Shelton	4	6th Place
Houston Kelly	21	Memphis, TN	Kelly Clarkson	29	Knockout Rounds
Hunter Jordan	22	Maysville, KY	Adam Levine	29	Battle Rounds
Hunter Plake	20	Baton Rouge, LA	Gwen Stefani ^{K}	12	5th/6th Place
Huntley	33	Spring Hill, FL	Niall Horan	24	Winner
Ian Flanigan	30	Saugerties, NY	Blake Shelton	19	3rd Place
Ian Harrison	20	Louis Center, OH	John Legend ^{H}	22	Knockout Rounds
Ignatious Carmouche	23	Opelousas, LA	Jennifer Hudson	13	Battle Rounds
Ilianna Viramontes	18	Brentwood, CA	Miley Cyrus	13	Battle Rounds
India Carney	21	Brooklyn, NY	Christina Aguilera	8	5th Place
Injoy Fountain	28	Wichita, KS	Kelly Clarkson	17	Battle Rounds
Iris Herrera	19	Newaygo, MI	Kelsea Ballerini	27 ^{V20}	6th/7th/8th Place
Ivonne Acero	17	Aguila, AZ	Blake Shelton ^{G}	9 ^{V6}	Live Playoffs
J'Sun	26	Brooklyn, NY	Shakira	4	Battle Rounds
J.Paul	37	Washington, D.C.	Michael Bublé	26	Knockout Rounds
J.T. Rodriguez	28	Chattanooga, TN	Bebe Rexha	16	Comeback Stage
Jaali Boyd	25	Baltimore, MD	Adam Levine	29	Knockout Rounds
Jack Austin	21	Battle Creek, MI	Michael Bublé ^{W}	28	Knockout Rounds
Jack Cassidy	18	Westlake Village, CA	Alicia Keys	12	Live Playoffs
Jack Gregori	37	Washington, D.C.	Adam Levine	8	Battle Rounds
Jack Rogan	18	Rochester, NY	John Legend	21	Battle Rounds
Jackie Foster	21	Boston, MA	Alicia Keys ^{L} ^{A2}	14	7th/8th Place
Jackie Romeo	20	Massapequa, NY	Reba McEntire ^{P}	25	Playoffs
Jackie Verna	22	West Chester, PA	Adam Levine	14	9th/10th Place
Jackson Marlow	18	Rogersville, AL	Kelly Clarkson	16	Battle Rounds
Jackson Snelling	21	Austin, IN	Reba McEntire	24	Battle Rounds
Jaclyn Lovey	17	Placerville, CA	Blake Shelton ^{K}	14	Knockout Rounds
Jacob Daniel Murphy	27	Elk Grove, CA	Blake Shelton	18	Battle Rounds
Jacob Maxwell	20	Coeur d'Alene, ID	John Legend	16	Live Playoffs ^{N2}
Jacob Miller	29	Eden, WI	Nick Jonas	18	Knockout Rounds
Jacob Poole	30	Warner Robins, GA	Christina Aguilera	5	Battle Rounds
Jacob Rummell	18	Hartville, OH	Pharrell Williams ^{B}	8	Knockout Rounds
Jacquelyn George	27	Franklin, TN	John Legend	27	Knockout Rounds
Jacqui Sandell	24	Oakland, NJ	Blake Shelton	4	Battle Rounds
Jacquie Lee	16	Colts Neck, NJ	Christina Aguilera	5	Runner-up
Jacquie Roar	37	North Plains, OR	Reba McEntire ^{H}	24	4th Place
Jadyn Cree	23	Lincoln, NE	Michael Bublé	27	5th Place
Jaeden Luke	22	Bothell, WA	Camila Cabello ^{B}	22	Knockout Rounds
Jaelen Johnston	21	Derby, KS	Kelsea Ballerini	27	Runner-up ^{I3}
Jake Barker	28	St. Petersburg, FL	Adam Levine ^{F}	6	Playoffs
Jake HaldenVang	24	Charlotte, NC	Gwen Stefani	17	Live Playoffs
Jake Hoot	30	Cookeville, TN	Kelly Clarkson	17	Winner
Jake Tankersley	31	Sand Springs, OK	Gwen Stefani ^{AA}	26	Playoffs
Jake Wells	23	Kansas City, MO	Adam Levine	15	Knockout Rounds
Jake Worthington	17	La Porte, TX	Blake Shelton	6 ^{V4}	Runner-up
Jamai	29	Chester, PA	Alicia Keys	14	Battle Rounds
Jamal Corrie	26	San Francisco, CA	Blake Shelton	18	Battle Rounds
Jamar Langley	36	Andrews, SC	Chance the Rapper	23	Playoffs
Jamar Rogers	29	New York, NY	CeeLo Green	2	5th/6th/7th/8th Place
Jamella	22	Chicago, IL	Kelly Clarkson	14	Knockout Rounds
James David Carter	34	Atlanta, GA	Blake Shelton	7	Live Playoffs
James Dupré	30	Bayou Chicot, LA	Adam Levine	9	Knockout Rounds
James Irwin	31	St. Louis, MO	Adam Levine	5	Knockout Rounds
James Massone	23	Boston, MA	CeeLo Green	2	9th/10th/11th/12th Place
James McNeiece	26	Traverse City, MI	Adam Levine	8	Battle Rounds
James Pyle	30	West Hills, CA	Blake Shelton ^{P}	19	Knockout Rounds
James Violet	20	Syracuse, UT	John Legend ^{H}	17	Knockout Rounds
James Wolpert	22	Lancaster, PA	Adam Levine	5	4th/5th Place
Jamie Lono	22	Chicago, IL	CeeLo Green	2	Battle Rounds
Jamila Thompson	21	Atlanta, GA	Usher	4	Battle Rounds
Jamison Puckett	34	Memphis, TN	Michael Bublé	26	Battle Rounds
Jan Dan	29	Newark, NJ	Gwen Stefani	26	6th/7th/8th Place ^{N}
Janice Freeman	32	Compton, CA	Miley Cyrus	13	11th Place
Janora Brown	22	Wingate, NC	John Legend	21	Battle Rounds
JaRae Womack	35	Miami, FL	John Legend	24	Battle Rounds
Jared Blake	32	Star City, AR	Blake Shelton	1	13th/14th/15th/16th Place
Jared Harder	22	Joplin, MO	Blake Shelton	10	Battle Rounds
Jared Herzog	21	Niceville, FL	John Legend	17	Battle Rounds
Jared Shoemaker	32	Richmond, KY	Adam Levine	29	5th/6th/7th/8th/9th Place
Jaron Strom	29	Shelby, NC	Blake Shelton	14	Knockout Rounds
Jarred Mathew	31	Riverside, CA	Adam Levine	15	Battle Rounds
Jason Arcilla	34	Kahului, HI	Gwen Stefani	24	Knockout Rounds
Jason Warrior	21	Chicago, IL	Blake Shelton ^{K} ^{A2}	11	Live Playoffs
Jaukeem Fortson	14	Elberton, GA	Michael Bublé ^{Y}	26	Playoffs
Javier Colon	33	Stratford, CT	Adam Levine	1	Winner
Jay Allen	36	Cedar Falls, IA	Blake Shelton ^{H}	22	Knockout Rounds
Jay Ammo	29	Clarksville, TN	John Legend	27	Battle Rounds
Jaylen Dunham	14	Charlotte, NC	Gwen Stefani	26	Battle Rounds ^{R}
Jazz McKenzie	31	Birmingham, AL	Michael Bublé	28	6th Place
JB Somers	31	Montgomery, AL	Kelly Clarkson	23	Battle Rounds
JChosen	29	Albany, GA	Gwen Stefani	12	Live Playoffs
JD Casper	28	Austin, TX	Kelly Clarkson	20	Battle Rounds
Jean Kelley	29	Nashville, TN	Pharrell Williams ^{H}	7	Live Playoffs
Jeff Jenkins	22	Jones Creek, TX	Adam Levine	1	9th/10th/11th/12th Place
Jeff Lewis	28	Dallas, TX	Usher	4	Battle Rounds
Jeffery Austin	24	Chicago, IL	Gwen Stefani	9	4th Place
Jej Vinson	22	Davao City	Kelly Clarkson	16	11th/12th/13th Place
Jej Vinson	26	Davao City	Kelly Clarkson	23 (Sheer Element)	Battle Rounds (Sheer Element)
Jenna Marquis	19	Simi Valley, CA	Gwen Stefani	24	Knockout Rounds
Jeremiah Miller	18	Fort Worth, TX	Jennifer Hudson	13	Knockout Rounds
Jeremy Beloate	26	Memphis, TN	Snoop Dogg ^{BB}	26	5th Place
Jeremy Briggs	26	Sacramento, CA	Shakira	6	Battle Rounds
Jeremy Gaynor	30	West Point, NY	Christina Aguilera	8	Battle Rounds
Jeremy Keith	40	Washington, D.C.	Adam Levine	29	5th/6th/7th/8th/9th Place
Jeremy Rosado	29	Tampa, FL	Kelly Clarkson	21	9th/10th Place
Jermaine Paul	33	Orange County, NY	Blake Shelton	2	Winner
Jerome Godwin III	20	Ashford, AL	Niall Horan	23	Knockout Rounds
Jerrell Melton	29	Fayetteville, GA	Snoop Dogg	28	Battle Rounds
Jershika Maple	24	Killeen, TX	John Legend ^{L}	21	5th Place
Jess Kellner	21	Austin, TX	Usher	4	Knockout Rounds
Jesse Campbell	42	Maywood, IL	Christina Aguilera	2	13th/14th/15th/16th Place
Jesse Larson	34	Minneapolis, MN	Adam Levine	12	4th Place
Jessica Childress	26	Lancaster, CA	Usher	4	Battle Rounds
Jessica Crosbie	21	Atlanta, GA	Adam Levine ^{G}	10	Knockout Rounds
Jessica Manalo	31	Las Vegas, NV	Kelsea Ballerini	27	Battle Rounds
Jessie Lawrence	31	Newark, NJ	Gwen Stefani	17	Knockout Rounds ^{N3}
Jessie Pitts	18	Birmingham, AL	Blake Shelton ^{H}	7	11th/12th Place
JessLee	26	Loxahatchee, FL	Blake Shelton	14	Battle Rounds
Jillian Jordyn	17	Melville, NY	Gwen Stefani	22	Battle Rounds
Jim & Sasha Allen	57/20	Newtown, CT	Ariana Grande	21	6th/7th/8th Place
Jim Ranger	38	Bakersfield, CA	Blake Shelton	19	Runner-up
Jimmy Mowery	31	Altoona, PA	John Legend ^{A}	16	Live Playoffs
Joana Martinez	15	Miami, FL	Gwen Stefani ^{B}	17	9th/10th Place
Joanna Serenko	18	St. Louis, MO	Blake Shelton ^{S} ^{P2}	18	6th/7th/8th/9th Place
Joe Kirk	17	Nashville, TN	Adam Levine	7	Battle Rounds
Joe Kirkland	24	Fort Worth, TX	Adam Levine	3	Knockout Rounds
Joe Maye	24	Baltimore, MD	Blake Shelton ^{D}	10 ^{V7}	Live Playoffs
Joe Tolo	21	Sacramento, CA	Christina Aguilera	8	Knockout Rounds
Joe Vivona	27	West Caldwell, NJ	Pharrell Williams	10	Battle Rounds
Joei Fulco	22	Lancaster, CA	Blake Shelton	18	Live Playoffs
Joey Green	35	Crowley, TX	Blake Shelton	15	Battle Rounds
John Gilman	23	Bayville, NJ	Adam Levine	10	Battle Rounds
John Holiday	35	Rosenberg, TX	John Legend	19	5th Place
John Martin	25	Chicago, IL	Blake Shelton	7	Battle Rounds
John Sullivan	32	Lincoln, NE	Blake Shelton	19	Battle Rounds
Johnny Bliss	26	Puerto Rico/New York, NY	Alicia Keys	14	Live Playoffs
Johnny Gates	31	Providence, RI	Gwen Stefani	12	Live Playoffs
Johnny Hayes	29	Mobile, AL	Adam Levine	12 ^{V9}	Live Playoffs
Johnny Rez	25	Miami, FL	Adam Levine	11	Battle Rounds
Jon Mero	31	Atlanta, GA	Adam Levine	13	12th Place
Jon Mullins	32	Lynchburg, VA	Nick Jonas ^{B}	18	Knockout Rounds
Jonah Mayor	31	Bronx, NY	Kelly Clarkson	29	Knockout Rounds
Jonathan Bach	20	Ann Arbor, MI	Pharrell Williams	10	Battle Rounds
Jonathan Hutcherson	16	Wilmore, KY	Pharrell Williams	10	Battle Rounds
Jonathan Mouton	30	Los Angeles, CA	Blake Shelton ^{P}	21	Knockout Rounds
Jonathan Wyndham	22	Lexington, SC	Adam Levine	7	Battle Rounds
Jonathas	24	Rio de Janeiro	Christina Aguilera	2	Battle Rounds
Jonny Gray	29	Austin, TX	CeeLo Green	5	11th/12th Place
Jordan Allen	30	London, KY	John Legend	27	Battle Rounds
Jordan Chase Torrez	19	Pensacola, FL	Blake Shelton	17	Battle Rounds
Jordan Kirkdorffer	28	New Paris, IN	Blake Shelton	14	Battle Rounds
Jordan Matthew Young	34	Austin, TX	Blake Shelton	20	3rd Place
Jordan Pruitt	21	Loganville, GA	Christina Aguilera	3	Battle Rounds
Jordan Rager	17	Loganville, GA	Blake Shelton	2	Battle Rounds
Jordan Rainer	33	Atoka, OK	Reba McEntire	24	6th/7th/8th/9th Place
Jordan Smith	22	Harlan, KY	Adam Levine	9	Winner
Jordis Unga	29	Los Angeles, CA	Blake Shelton	2	13th/14th/15th/16th Place
Jordy Searcy	20	Fairhope, AL	Pharrell Williams	7	Battle Rounds
Jordyn Simone	20	Los Angeles, CA	Adam Levine ^{K}	14	Knockout Rounds
Jorge Eduardo	19	Guadalajara/Dallas, TX	Kelly Clarkson	14	Knockout Rounds
Jose Figueroa, Jr.	34	Kissimmee, FL	Nick Jonas	20	Live Playoffs
Jose Luis	21	Carolina, Puerto Rico	Gwen Stefani	26	Playoffs
Joselyn Rivera	17	Pembroke Pines, FL	Adam Levine ^{D}	3	Live Playoffs
Joseph Soul	34	Hana, HI	Gwen Stefani ^{L}	19	Live Playoffs
Josette Diaz	17	Cresskill, NJ	Miley Cyrus	11	Knockout Rounds
Josh Batstone	18	Fulton, NY	Adam Levine	8	Battle Rounds
Josh Davis	20	Cleveland, TN	Kelly Clarkson	15	Battle Rounds
Josh Gallagher	25	Cresson, PA	Adam Levine ^{B}	11	4th Place
Josh Halverson	31	Denton, TX	Alicia Keys ^{J2}	11	Live Playoffs
Josh Hoyer	40	Lincoln, NE	Blake Shelton	12	Battle Rounds
Josh Kaufman	38	Indianapolis, IN	Usher ^{A}	6	Winner
Josh Logan	33	Manchester, NH	Christina Aguilera	5	11th/12th Place
Josh Murley	30	Kerrville, TX	Shakira ^{A}	6	Battle Rounds
Josh Sanders	35	Kannapolis, NC	Reba McEntire	25	Runner-up
Josh West	17	Glendale, AZ	Adam Levine	12	Live Playoffs
Joshua Davis	37	Traverse City, MI	Adam Levine ^{B}	8	3rd Place
Joshua Howard	25	Philadelphia, PA	Adam Levine	6	Battle Rounds
Joshua Vacanti	28	Lockport, NY	John Legend	21	6th/7th/8th Place
Josiah Hawley	27	Fort Smith, AR	Usher	4	9th/10th Place
Josie Jones	16	Hamilton, AL	Blake Shelton	17	Battle Rounds
Joslynn Rose	16	Lake Benton, MN	Gwen Stefani	24	Battle Rounds
Jozy Bernadette	25	Grand Forks, ND	Gwen Stefani	12	Battle Rounds
JR Aquino	24	Anchorage, AK	CeeLo Green	3	Battle Rounds
JSOUL	26	Virginia Beach, VA	Adam Levine	11	Battle Rounds
Jubal & Amanda (Jubal Lee Young & Amanda Preslar)	44/36	Tulsa, OK	Pharrell Williams	9	Battle Rounds
Judith Hill	29	Los Angeles, CA	Adam Levine	4	7th/8th Place
Juhi	16	Nashville, TN	Adam Levine ^{C}	5	Knockout Rounds
Jules	15	Peoria, AZ	Kelly Clarkson	18	Battle Rounds
Julia Aslanli	23	Orlando, FL	Gwen Stefani	22	Battle Rounds
Julia Cooper	21	Poland, OH	John Legend	19	Knockout Rounds ^{N3}
Julia Eason	18	Palos Verdes, CA	Christina Aguilera	1	Battle Rounds
Julia Golden	19	Carthage, NC	Kelly Clarkson	29	Battle Rounds
Julia Roome	13	Warwick, NY	Niall Horan	24	Playoffs ^{I2}
Julian King	25	Philadelphia, PA	John Legend	16	Live Cross Battle Rounds
Julien Martinez	21	Oxnard, CA	Adam Levine	12	Battle Rounds
Juliet Simms	25	Tampa, FL	CeeLo Green	2	Runner-up
Juliette Ojeda	20	Hialeah, FL	Gwen Stefani	24	Battle Rounds
Julio Cesar Castillo	21	Chicago, IL	Blake Shelton	3	Live Playoffs
Jus Jon	30	Newport News, VA	Blake Shelton	19	Knockout Rounds
Justin & Jeremy Garcia	17	Millbrae, CA	Reba McEntire ^{Z}	25	Playoffs
Justin Aaron	34	Junction City, KS	Gwen Stefani	22	6th/7th/8th Place
Justin Blake	20	Savannah, TN	Adam Levine	5	Battle Rounds
Justin Chain	23	Fort Payne, AL	Blake Shelton	5	Battle Rounds
Justin Grennan	33	Enumclaw, WA	Christina Aguilera	1	Battle Rounds
Justin Hopkins	30	Tigard, OR	CeeLo Green	2	Battle Rounds
Justin Johnes	15	Massapequa, NY	Blake Shelton	7	Battle Rounds
Justin Kilgore	30	Buffalo, TX	Kelly Clarkson	14	Knockout Rounds
Justin Rivers	28	Bowling Green, KY	Blake Shelton	4	Live Playoffs
Justin Whisnant	28	Baltimore, MD	Blake Shelton	10	Live Playoffs ^{I}
JW Griffin	25	Moultrie, GA	Kelly Clarkson	29	5th/6th/7th/8th/9th Place
Kailey Abel	19	Verdigris, OK	Blake Shelton	18	Battle Rounds
Kaitlyn Velez	21	Copiague, New York	Blake Shelton	21	Battle Rounds
Kaiya Hamilton	26	Atlanta, GA	Michael Bublé	27	9th/10th/11th/12th Place ^{I3}
Kala Banham	24	Windermere, FL	Chance the Rapper ^{W} ^{L2}	23	Playoffs
Kaleb Lee	31	Ormond Beach, FL	Kelly Clarkson ^{B}	14	5th/6th Place
Kaleigh Glanton	20	Wichita, KS	Blake Shelton	6	Battle Rounds
Kalvin Jarvis	29	Tucson, AZ	Adam Levine	16	Live Playoffs
Kamalei Kawaʻa	26	Maui, HI	John Legend ^{X}	25	Playoffs
Kameron Jaso	18	Wichita, KS	Michael Bublé	27	Knockout Rounds
Kameron Marlowe	21	Kannapolis, NC	Adam Levine ^{B}	15	Live Playoffs
Kamila Kiehne	17	Los Lunas, NM	Michael Bublé	26	Battle Rounds
Kanard Thomas	28	Jacksonville, FL	Bebe Rexha	16	Live Playoffs
Kanard Thomas	35	Columbus, GA	Snoop Dogg	28	Battle Rounds
Kara McKee	36	Cumberland, RI	John Legend	22	Battle Rounds
Kara Tenae	33	Riverside, CA	Gwen Stefani	24	10th/11th/12th Place
Karen Galera	19	Dallas, TX	Kelly Clarkson	16	Live Cross Battle Rounds
Karen Waldrup	36	Mandeville, LA	Dan + Shay	25	5th Place
Karina Iglesias	35	Miami, FL	Shakira ^{A}	4	Live Playoffs
Karla Davis	25	Monroe, NC	Adam Levine	2	17th/18th/19th/20th Place
Karlee Metzger	22	Marquette, MI	Blake Shelton ^{J}	11	Knockout Rounds
Karli Webster	21	Fort Worth, TX	Miley Cyrus	13	Playoffs ^{I2}
Karly Moreno	23	Mission Viejo, CA	Blake Shelton ^{A}	16	Live Cross Battle Rounds
Kason Lester	33	Lebanon, TN	Blake Shelton	23	Battle Rounds
Kat Hammock	18	Encinitas, CA	Blake Shelton	17	5th/6th Place
Kat Perkins	33	Minneapolis, MN	Adam Levine	6	4th/5th Place
Kat Robichaud	29	Raleigh, NC	CeeLo Green	5	9th/10th Place
Kata Hay	28	Skiatook, OK	Christina Aguilera	10	Live Playoffs
Kate Cosentino	23	Kansas City, MO	Niall Horan	23	Knockout Rounds
Kate Kalvach	27	Oklahoma City, OK	Camila Cabello ^{B}	22	Live Playoffs
Katelyn Read	25	Raleigh, NC	Christina Aguilera	8	Battle Rounds
Katherine Ho	16	Thousand Oaks, CA	Adam Levine	10	Knockout Rounds
Katherine Ann Mohler	22	Memphis, TN	Ariana Grande	21	Knockout Rounds
Kathrina Feigh	24	Quezon City/New York, NY	Blake Shelton ^{M}	13	Knockout Rounds
Katie Basden	23	Durham, NC	Blake Shelton	10	Live Playoffs
Katie Beth Forakis	25	Savannah, TN	Kelly Clarkson	23	Battle Rounds
Katie Kadan	38	Chicago, IL	John Legend	17	3rd Place
Katie O.	18	Jacksonville, FL	Reba McEntire	26	Playoffs
Katie Rae	35	Milpitas, CA	Kelly Clarkson ^{T}	21	Live Playoffs
Katrina Cain	29	Denton, TX	Blake Shelton	15	Knockout Rounds
Katrina Parker	34	Hollywood, CA	Adam Levine	2	5th/6th/7th/8th Place
Katrina Rose	34	Astoria, Queens, NY	Jennifer Hudson ^{J}	13	Knockout Rounds
Katriz Trinidad	15	San Diego, CA	Pharrell Williams	7	Knockout Rounds
Kawan DeBose	30	Miami, FL	Adam Levine	12	Battle Rounds
Kay Sibal	24	Los Angeles, CA	Gwen Stefani	26	Knockout Rounds
Kayla Nevarez	17	Mission Viejo, CA	Adam Levine	3	Knockout Rounds
Kayla Seeber	18	Poplar Grove, IL	Bebe Rexha	16	Comeback Stage
Kayla Von der Heide	30	Bisbee, AZ	Gwen Stefani	22	Knockout Rounds
Kaylee Shimizu	17	'Ewa Beach, HI	John Legend	24	Playoffs
Kayleigh Clark	20	Sumrall, MS	Niall Horan	28	Knockout Rounds
Kayley Hill	28	Nashville, TN	Blake Shelton	15	Battle Rounds
Kayslin Victoria	16	Clermont, FL	John Legend	16	Live Cross Battle Rounds
KCK3 (Kaitlynn, Chelsea, and Kyla Keller)	17-26	Brandon, MS	Ariana Grande	21	Battle Rounds
Keaira LaShae	30	Los Angeles, CA	CeeLo Green	5	Battle Rounds
Keegan Ferrell	21	Fort Wayne, IN	Nick Jonas ^{B}	20	Knockout Rounds
Keilah Grace	15	New York City, NY	John Legend	21	Battle Rounds
Keisha Renee	30	Inglewood, CA	Blake Shelton	13	7th/8th Place
Keith Paluso	30	Memphis, TN	Kelly Clarkson ^{B} ^{A2}	15	Live Playoffs
Keith Semple	34	Larne, Northern Ireland, UK	Adam Levine	9	Live Playoffs
Kelli Douglas	31	Dallas, TX	Adam Levine	7	Battle Rounds
Kelly Crapa	15	New Fairfield, CT	Blake Shelton	3	Battle Rounds
Kelsea Johnson	21	Newark, DE	Alicia Keys	14	Live Playoffs
Kelsey Rey (Felsmere)	20	Sebastian, FL	CeeLo Green	1	Battle Rounds
Kelsey Rey (Felsmere)	33	Viera Beach, FL	Gwen Stefani	26 (Felsmere)	Knockout Rounds (Felsmere)
Kelsie May	15	Louisa, KY	Blake Shelton	8	Knockout Rounds
Kelsie Watts	29	Lubbock, TX	Kelly Clarkson	19	Knockout Rounds
Kendall Eugene	37	Indiana, PA	Reba McEntire	26	Knockout Rounds ^{R}
Kendra Checketts	19	San Diego, CA	Blake Shelton ^{A2}	16	Live Playoffs
Kendra Remedios	31	Arlington, TX	John Legend	29	Battle Rounds
Kennedy Holmes	13	St. Louis, MO	Jennifer Hudson	15	4th Place
Kenny Iko	35	Washington, D.C.	Snoop Dogg	28	Knockout Rounds
Kenny P.	30	Cleveland, OH	Gwen Stefani	12	Battle Rounds
Kensington Moore	16	Campbellsville, KY	Blake Shelton	7	Battle Rounds
Kenzie Wheeler	22	Dover, FL	Kelly Clarkson	20	Runner-up
Kevin Farris	33	Arlington Heights, IL	Nick Jonas	18	Battle Rounds
Kevin James Graham	33	Boston, MA	Reba McEntire	26	Battle Rounds
Kevin Hawkins	28	Lancaster, TX	Gwen Stefani ^{B}	22	Live Playoffs
Khalea Lynee	36	Tampa, FL	John Legend	17	Live Playoffs
Khaliya Kimberlie	16	Mescalero, NM	Miley Cyrus	11	Battle Rounds
Kiara Brown	21	Las Vegas, NV	Kelly Clarkson ^{H}	17	Knockout Rounds
Kiara Vega	19	Vega Baja, Puerto Rico	Michael Bublé	26	Knockout Rounds
Kim Cherry	30	Niceville, FL	Blake Shelton	16	7th/8th Place
Kim Cruse	30	Woodville, TX	John Legend	22	6th/7th/8th Place
Kim Yarbrough	50	Los Angeles, CA	Adam Levine	2	17th/18th/19th/20th Place
Kimberly Nichole	32	New York, NY	Christina Aguilera ^{G}	8	6th Place
Kinsey Rose	35	Nashville, TN	Kelly Clarkson	21	Knockout Rounds ^{N3}
Kirbi	24	Florence, AL	Niall Horan	28	Playoffs
Kirk Jay	22	Bay Minette, AL	Blake Shelton	15	3rd Place
Kique Gomez	19	Miami, FL	Gwen Stefani	22	9th/10th Place
KJ Jennings	22	Austin, TX	John Legend	21	Battle Rounds
KJ Willis	35	Memphis, TN	John Legend	29	5th/6th/7th/8th/9th Place
Klea Olson	20	Layton, UT	Bebe Rexha	16	Comeback Stage
Kolby Cordell	32	Ontario, CA	Adam Levine ^{P}	27	9th/10th/11th/12th Place
Korin Bukowski	19	Miami, FL	Gwen Stefani	9	10th Place
Koryn Hawthorne	17	Abbeville, LA	Pharrell Williams ^{D}	8	4th Place
Kota Wade	20	Los Angeles, CA	Gwen Stefani	9	Knockout Rounds
Kris Thomas	27	Memphis, TN	Shakira	4	9th/10th Place
Krista Hughes	22	Coal City, WV	Blake Shelton	9	Battle Rounds
Kristen Brown	24	Roseville, CA	John Legend ^{H}	24	Playoffs
Kristen Marie	20	Oklahoma City, OK	Christina Aguilera	10	Battle Rounds
Kristen Merlin	29	Hanson, MA	Shakira	6	4th/5th Place
Kristi Hoopes	19	Parker, CO	Blake Shelton	13	Battle Rounds
Kyla Jade	33	Nashville, TN	Blake Shelton	14	3rd Place
Kyle Schuesler	19	Huntington Beach, CA	Chance the Rapper ^{Z}	25	Playoffs
Kylee Dayne	19	Carrollton, TX	Blake Shelton	23	Playoffs
Kylie Rothfield	23	Danville, CA	Alicia Keys	11	Live Playoffs
Kymberli Joye	26	Windsor, CT	Kelly Clarkson	15	7th/8th Place
Kyndal Inskeep	22	Nashville, TN	Gwen Stefani	17	Live Playoffs
L. Rodgers	34	Baltimore, MD	Reba McEntire	25	10th/11th/12th Place ^{N4}
Lacy Mandigo	18	Statesville, NC	Pharrell Williams ^{D} ^{B2}	10	Live Playoffs
Lain Roy	22	Larkspur, CO	Gwen Stefani	19	Battle Rounds
Laith Al-Saadi	38	Ann Arbor, MI	Adam Levine	10	4th Place
Lana Love	30	Glendale, CA	John Legend	22	Battle Rounds
Lana Scott	28	Chesapeake, VA	Blake Shelton	21	6th/7th/8th Place ^{N3}
Lane Mack	30	Lafayette, LA	Miley Cyrus	11	Battle Rounds
Larriah Jackson	15	Sacramento, CA	Gwen Stefani	19	Knockout Rounds ^{N3}
Laura Littleton	26	Dickson, TN	Niall Horan	23	Battle Rounds
Laura Vivas	24	West Palm Beach, FL	Christina Aguilera	3	Knockout Rounds
Laura Williams	20	Quakertown, PA	Niall Horan	24	Battle Rounds
Lauren Anderson	40	Oak Park, IL	Snoop Dogg	28	Knockout Rounds
Lauren Diaz	33	Apple Valley, CA	Miley Cyrus ^{K}	11	Knockout Rounds
Lauren Duski	25	Gaylord, MI	Blake Shelton	12	Runner-up
Lauren Frihauf	16	Byers, CO	John Legend ^{H}	19	Knockout Rounds
Lauren Hall	25	Chicago, IL	Blake Shelton ^{L}	17	Knockout Rounds
Lauren-Michael Sellers	35	Birmingham, AL	Reba McEntire	26	Playoffs
Lauryn Judd	16	Draper, UT	Gwen Stefani	12	Battle Rounds
LB Crew	29	Little Rock, AR	Adam Levine	16	9th/10th Place ^{Q2}
Lee Koch	27	Temecula, CA	Christina Aguilera	2	Battle Rounds
Lela	15	Miami, FL	Jennifer Hudson	15	Battle Rounds
Lelia Broussard	23	Los Angeles, CA	Blake Shelton	3	Battle Rounds
Lennon VanderDoes	27	Wilmington, DE	Gwen Stefani ^{W}	24	Playoffs ^{I2}
Letter to Elise (Elliott Hunt and Chris Lillis)	27/30	Buffalo, NY	Reba McEntire	28 ^{V21}	Battle Rounds
Levi Watkins	14	Birmingham, AL	Blake Shelton	18	Knockout Rounds
Lex Land	24	Austin, TX	Blake Shelton	2	Battle Rounds
Lexi Dávila	17	Lorain, OH	Christina Aguilera ^{A}	8	Live Playoffs
Lexi Luca	17	Wellington, FL	Blake Shelton	6	Battle Rounds
Leyton Robinson	23	Rogers, AR	Reba McEntire	28	Knockout Rounds
Liam St. John	29	Spokane, WA	Gwen Stefani	19	Battle Rounds
Liam von Elbe	30	Plattsburgh, NY	Niall Horan	28	Knockout Rounds
Libianca	20	Minneapolis, MN	Blake Shelton	21	Live Playoffs
Lila Forde	24	Seattle, WA	John Legend	24	5th Place
LiLi Joy	15	Chino Hills, CA	Blake Shelton	16	Battle Rounds
Lilli Passero	26	Los Angeles, CA	Adam Levine ^{K}	12	9th/10th Place
Lily Elise	20	San Anselmo, CA	Christina Aguilera	1	13th/14th/15th/16th Place
Lily Green	16	Brooklyn, NY	Adam Levine	10	Battle Rounds
Lina Gaudenzi	23	Miami, FL	Adam Levine ^{D}	5	Knockout Rounds
Lindsay Bruce	25	Santa Rosa, CA	Shakira	6	Battle Rounds
Lindsay Joan	22	San Diego, CA	Nick Jonas	20	Battle Rounds
Lindsay Pagano	27	Philadelphia, PA	Shakira	6	Battle Rounds
Lindsey Pavao	22	Sacramento, CA	Christina Aguilera	2	5th/6th/7th/8th Place
Lisa Ramey	33	New York, NY	John Legend	16 ^{V12}	Live Playoffs
Lisa Scinta	26	Las Vegas, NV	Christina Aguilera	3	Battle Rounds
Liv Ciara	16	St. Peters, MO	Kelly Clarkson	29 ^{V22}	Runner-up ^{I3}
Livia Faith	17	Stanton, KY	Alicia Keys	14	Battle Rounds
Liz Davis	25	Madison, MS	Blake Shelton	3	Live Playoffs
Loren Allred	22	Salt Lake City, UT/Pittsburgh, PA	Adam Levine	3	Live Playoffs
Lowell Oakley	19	Durham, NC	Pharrell Williams	8	Live Playoffs
Lucas Beltran	19	Philadelphia, PA	Michael Bublé	28	Battle Rounds
Lucas Holliday	26	Lansing, MI	Jennifer Hudson	13	Playoffs ^{I2}
Lucas West	20	Fairport, NY	John Legend	29	3rd Place
Lucia Flores-Wiseman	22	Maple Valley, WA	Adam Levine	27	4th Place
Luke Edgemon	24	Fayetteville, NC	Blake Shelton ^{E}	4	Knockout Rounds
Luke Wade	31	Dublin, TX	Pharrell Williams	7	6th/7th/8th Place
Lupe Carroll	26	Bourbonnais, IL	CeeLo Green	5	Battle Rounds
LVNDR	27	Memphis, TN	Niall Horan	24	Battle Rounds
Lyndsey Elm	22	Vacaville, CA	Gwen Stefani	9	Battle Rounds
Lynnea Moorer	18	Monterey, CA	Kelly Clarkson ^{O}	15	11th Place
Mac Royals	30	Wrightsville, AR	John Legend ^{Y}	24	6th/7th/8th/9th Place
MacKenzie Bourg	19	Lafayette, LA	CeeLo Green	3	Live Playoffs
Maddi Jane	24	Chicago, IL	Chance the Rapper	25	6th/7th/8th/9th Place
Madeline Consoer	24	Eagle River, WI	Kelly Clarkson	19	Live Playoffs
Madi Davis	16	McKinney, TX	Pharrell Williams	9	5th/6th Place
Madilyn Paige	16	Provo, UT	Blake Shelton ^{F}	6	Playoffs
Madison Cain	24	Sausalito, CA	Kelsea Ballerini	15	Comeback Stage
Madison Curbelo	21	Westfield, MA	Dan + Shay	25 ^{V15}	6th/7th/8th/9th Place ^{N4}
Madison Hughes	25	Ponte Vedra Beach, FL	Blake Shelton	22	Battle Rounds
Maelyn Jarmon	26	Frisco, TX	John Legend	16	Winner
Mafe	22	Miami, FL	John Legend	25	Playoffs
Magnus Martin	25	Virginia Beach, VA	Chance the Rapper	23	Knockout Rounds
Maharasyi	27	Indonesia/Los Angeles, CA	Jennifer Hudson	13	Battle Rounds
Maiya Sykes	36	Los Angeles, CA	Pharrell Williams	7	Battle Rounds
MaKenzie Thomas	20	Wallingford, KY	Jennifer Hudson	15 ^{V11}	5th/6th Place
Makenzie Phipps	23	Bluefield, VA	Snoop Dogg	28	Battle Rounds
Malik Davage	23	Washington, DC	Adam Levine	12	Knockout Rounds
Malik Heard	19	Dallas, TX	Pharrell Williams ^{D}	10	Knockout Rounds
Manasseh Samone	22	Dallas, TX	Chance the Rapper	23 ^{V17}	Playoffs ^{N4}
Mandi Castillo	23	San Antonio, TX	John Legend	18	Live Playoffs
Mandi Thomas	33	Memphis, TN	Kelly Clarkson	18	Live Playoffs
Manny Cabo	45	Elizabeth, NJ	Adam Levine	9	Battle Rounds
Manny Costello	28	Athens, GA	Reba McEntire	28	Battle Rounds
Manny Keith	31	Miami, FL	Ariana Grande ^{B}	21	Knockout Rounds
Mara Justine	21	Galloway, NJ	Niall Horan ^{P}	24	3rd Place
Marcos Covos	30	Odessa, TX	Kelly Clarkson	23	Knockout Rounds
Mari Jones	20	Clermont, FL	Adam Levine	16	9th/10th Place
Mariah Kalia	17	Jacksonville, FL	Chance the Rapper	23	Battle Rounds
Marina Chello	37	Samarkand, Uzbekistan/Plainview, NY	Blake Shelton	17	Knockout Rounds ^{N3}
Marisa Corvo	33	Staten Island, NY	Kelly Clarkson	19	Knockout Rounds
MarissaAnne	15	Long Island, NY	Blake Shelton ^{D}	3	Knockout Rounds
Mark Andrew	27	Eden Prairie, MN	Shakira	4	Battle Rounds
Mark Hood	24	Chicago, IL	Pharrell Williams	9	12th Place
Mark Isaiah	19	Texarkana, TX	Adam Levine	12	9th/10th Place
Mark Shiiba	29	Swarthmore, PA	Michael Bublé	26	Battle Rounds ^{R}
Marty O'Reilly	36	Sonoma, CA	Michael Bublé	28	Knockout Rounds
Mary Kate Connor	17	Ashburn, VA	Blake Shelton	23	Playoffs ^{N4}
Mary McAvoy	35	Walpole, MA	Snoop Dogg	26	Knockout Rounds
Mary Miranda	17	Havana	Shakira	4	Knockout Rounds
Mary Sarah	20	Richmond, TX	Blake Shelton	10	5th/6th Place
Marybeth Byrd	18	Armorel, AR	John Legend	17	7th/8th Place
Mathai	18	Dallas, TX	Adam Levine	2	9th/10th/11th/12th Place
Matt Cermanski	20	Phoenixville, PA	Adam Levine	5 ^{V3}	Battle Rounds
Matt Johnson	26	Staunton, VA	Jennifer Hudson	15	Battle Rounds
Matt McAndrew	23	Philadelphia, PA	Adam Levine	7	Runner-up
Matt New	29	Midland, TX	John Legend	17	Battle Rounds
Matt Snook	41	Camden Point, MO	Blake Shelton	8	Battle Rounds
Matt Tedder	20	Fort Worth, TX/Nashville, TN	Adam Levine	10	Battle Rounds
Matthew Johnson	26	Jacksonville, FL	Kelly Clarkson ^{P}	16	Live Playoffs
Matthew McQueen	21	Georgetown, TX	Blake Shelton	17	Battle Rounds
Matthew Schuler	20	Yardley, PA	Christina Aguilera	5	6th Place
Max Boyle	23	Toledo, OH	Kelly Clarkson ^{P}	17	12th/13th Place
Max Chambers	14	Shreveport, LA	Michael Bublé	28	5th Place
Max Cooper III	23	Kansas City, KS	Michael Bublé	28	Knockout Rounds
Maya Smith	31	Los Angeles, CA	Christina Aguilera ^{G}	10	Knockout Rounds
Maye Thomas	27	Broken Arrow, OK	Miley Cyrus	11	Knockout Rounds
Mayra Alvarez	26	La Porte, TX	Gwen Stefani	7	Battle Rounds
Meagan McNeal	31	Chicago, IL	Jennifer Hudson	13	Battle Rounds
Megan Danielle	17	Douglasville, Georgia	Kelly Clarkson	18	6th/7th/8th/9th Place
Megan Lee	22	Los Angeles, CA	Alicia Keys	14	Battle Rounds
Megan Rose	20	San Francisco, CA	Blake Shelton ^{J}	13	Knockout Rounds
Megan Rüger	26	Twin Lakes, WI	Blake Shelton	6	Battle Rounds
Meghan Linsey	28	New Orleans, LA	Blake Shelton ^{G}	8	Runner-up
Melanie Martinez	17	Baldwin, NY	Adam Levine	3	5th/6th Place
Melinda Rodriguez	23	Miami, FL	Kelly Clarkson	17	Knockout Rounds ^{N3}
Melissa Jimenez	29	Fort Lee, NJ	Usher	6	Playoffs
Mendeleyev	28	Santa Barbara, CA	John Legend	17	Battle Rounds
Menlik Zergabachew	19	Silver Spring, MD	Pharrell Williams ^{H}	7	Knockout Rounds
Mercedes Ferreira-Dias	17	Miami, FL	Blake Shelton	15 ^{V11}	Battle Rounds
Mia Pfirrman	19	Temple City, CA	Adam Levine	7	Live Playoffs
Mia Z	15	Pittsburgh, PA	Pharrell Williams	8	11th/12th Place
Mia Boostrom	24	Boston, MA	Adam Levine	14	Live Playoffs
Micah Iverson	25	Tokyo, Japan	Kelly Clarkson	18	5th Place
Micah Tryba	24	Wheaton, IL	Blake Shelton	12	Battle Rounds
Michael Alexandersson	26	Salado, TX	Snoop Dogg	26	Battle Rounds
Michael Austin	43	Norco, CA	Adam Levine	4	Battle Rounds
Michael B.	29	Tulsa, OK	Niall Horan	23	Playoffs
Michael Kight	25	Dublin, GA	Adam Levine	13	Battle Rounds
Michael Lee	30	Fort Worth, TX	Blake Shelton	15	Live Playoffs
Michael Leier	20	Fargo, ND	Adam Levine	8	Battle Rounds
Michael Lynch	27	Chicago, IL	Christina Aguilera	5	Battle Rounds
Michael Sanchez	27	San Diego, CA	Alicia Keys	11	Knockout Rounds
Michael T.C. Williams	18	Mason, OH	Nick Jonas	18	Live Playoffs ^{N3}
Michaela Paige	16	Boca Raton, FL	Blake Shelton	3	11th/12th Place
Michelle Brooks-Thompson	28	Sunderland, MA	Adam Levine	3	Knockout Rounds
Michelle Chamuel	26	Amherst, MA	Usher	4	Runner-up
Michelle Raitzin	20	Great Neck, NY	Blake Shelton	4	Battle Rounds
Midas Whale (Jon Peter Lewis & Ryan Hayes)	32/26	Rexburg, ID	Adam Levine	4	Knockout Rounds
Mikaela Astel	14	Queens, NY	Kelly Clarkson	16	Battle Rounds
Mikaela Ayira	17	Johns Creek, GA	Snoop Dogg	26	Playoffs
Mike Jerel	31	Ashburn, GA	John Legend	18	Live Playoffs
Mike Parker	23	Warrenton, VA	Jennifer Hudson	15	Knockout Rounds
Mike Schiavo	21	Colonia, NJ	Adam Levine	10	Battle Rounds
Mike Steele	28	Tutwiler, MS	John Legend	29	Knockout Rounds
Mikele Buck	39	Big Chimney, WV	Kelly Clarkson	15	Battle Rounds
Mikenley Brown	20	New Castle, IN	Kelly Clarkson	29	4th Place
Mindy Miller	35	Damascus, MD	Snoop Dogg	28	Playoffs
Missy Robertson	34	Sacramento, CA	Alicia Keys	12	Battle Rounds
MisterMoon (Leah Colon and SAVS)	26/28	Nashville, TN	Snoop Dogg	26	Battle Rounds
Mitchell Lee	29	Charleston, SC	Blake Shelton	13	Playoffs
Miya Bass	25	Queens, NY	Alicia Keys ^{A}	14	Knockout Rounds
Molly Stevens	34	Raleigh, NC	Kelly Clarkson	14	Battle Rounds
Monika Leigh	28	Boulder, CO	CeeLo Green ^{B}	5	Knockout Rounds
Monique Abbadie	20	Miami, FL	Shakira	4	Knockout Rounds
Monique Benabou	23	Alameda, CA	Christina Aguilera	2	Battle Rounds
Mor Ilderton	21	Teays Valley, WV	Gwen Stefani ^{BB}	26	Withdrew
Morgan Frazier	22	Nashville, TN	Blake Shelton ^{G2}	9	Live Playoffs
Morgan Myles	35	Williamsport, PA	Camila Cabello	22	3rd Place
Morgan Taylor	21	Carmel, IN	John Legend	22	Knockout Rounds
Morgan Wallen	20	Knoxville, TN	Adam Levine ^{F}	6	Playoffs
Moriah Formica	16	Latham, NY	Miley Cyrus	13	Playoffs
Moses G.	31	Harlem, NY	Adam Levine	29	Knockout Rounds
Moses Stone	26	Los Angeles, CA	Christina Aguilera	2	21st/22nd/23rd/24th Place
Moushumi	22	Edison, NJ	Pharrell Williams	10	Live Playoffs
Ms. Monét	50	Pittsburg, CA	Reba McEntire	24	Playoffs ^{I2}
Music Box	28	Federal Way, WA	Usher ^{E}	6	Battle Rounds
Mycle Wastman	40	Seattle, WA	CeeLo Green	3	Knockout Rounds
Myracle Holloway	44	Los Angeles, CA	Gwen Stefani	17	11th Place
Nadège	26	Wellington, FL	Chance the Rapper	25	10th/11th/12th Place ^{N4}
Nadjah Nicole	23	New Castle, DE	Blake Shelton	9	Live Playoffs ^{I2}
Naia Kete	21	Santa Monica, CA	Blake Shelton	2	21st/22nd/23rd/24th Place
Nakia	36	Austin, TX	CeeLo Green	1	5th/6th/7th/8th Place
Nala Price	17	Sebring, FL	Adam Levine	12	Battle Rounds
Naomi Soleil	19	Maplewood, NJ	Michael Bublé	27	Battle Rounds
NariYella	20	Elkins Park, PA	Chance the Rapper	23	Knockout Rounds
Natalia Albertini	25	Cherry Hill, NJ	Snoop Dogg	28	Knockout Rounds ^{N3}
Natalie Brady	33	Nashville, TN	Adam Levine	15	Battle Rounds
Natalie Stovall	35	Nashville, TN	Blake Shelton	13	Playoffs ^{I}
Natalie Yacovazzi	28	Chicago, IL	Adam Levine	10 ^{V7}	Battle Rounds
Natasha Blaine	27	Seattle, WA	John Legend	29	Knockout Rounds
Natasha Bure	17	Los Angeles, CA	Adam Levine	11	Battle Rounds
Natasia GreyCloud	29	Nashville, TN	Blake Shelton ^{M} ^{L2}	15	Live Playoffs
Nate Butler	19	Shamong, NJ	Adam Levine	10	Live Playoffs ^{I2}
Nathalie Hernandez	15	Dunedin, FL	Christina Aguilera	3	Battle Rounds
Nathan & Chesi (Nathan & Chesi Arnett)	27-28	Paintsville, KY	Bebe Rexha	16	Comeback Stage
Nathan Chester	28	Chicago, IL	John Legend	25	4th Place
Nathan Hermida	17	Boston, MA	Adam Levine	8	Live Playoffs
Nathan Parrett	24	Los Angeles, CA	Adam Levine	2	Battle Rounds
Neil Salsich	34	St. Louis, MO	Kelly Clarkson ^{B}	23	Playoffs
Nell Simmons	40	New Orleans, LA	John Legend	27	Knockout Rounds ^{N3}
Nelly's Echo	32	Lagos	Christina Aguilera	3	Battle Rounds
Nelson Cade III	27	Anaheim, California	John Legend	18	Knockout Rounds ^{N3}
Nia Skyfer	26	Havana, Cuba	John Legend	22	Battle Rounds
Nic Hawk	26	Dallas, TX	Blake Shelton ^{A}	5	Live Playoffs
Nicholas David	31	Saint Paul, MN	CeeLo Green	3	3rd Place
Nick Hagelin	28	Atlanta, GA	Christina Aguilera ^{G}	10	9th Place ^{I2}
Nicole Johnson	18	Denham Springs, LA	Blake Shelton	3	Battle Rounds
Nicole Nelson	34	Burlington, VT	Adam Levine	3	Knockout Rounds
Nicolette Maré	20	Staten Island, NY	Adam Levine	8	Battle Rounds
Nicolle Galyon	27	Sterling, KS	Adam Levine	2	Battle Rounds
Niki Dawson	19	Jacksonville, FL	CeeLo Green	1	Battle Rounds
Nini Iris	27	Brooklyn, NY	Niall Horan	24	6th/7th/8th/9th Place
Noah Jackson	19	Sunderland, MA	Gwen Stefani	9	Battle Rounds
Noah Lis	22	Palmer, MA	Blake Shelton	6	Battle Rounds
Noah Mac	17	Dublin, CA	Jennifer Hudson ^{B}	13	5th/6th Place
Noah Spencer	20	Richlands, VA	Reba McEntire ^{W}	24	Playoffs
Noelle Bybee	17	Syracuse, UT	Pharrell Williams	8	Battle Rounds
Noivas	30	Jasper, TX	Blake Shelton ^{X}	23	5th Place
Nolan Neal	35	Nashville, TN	Adam Levine	11 ^{V8}	Knockout Rounds
OK3 (Makenna Fields, Sierra Sikes Posada, and Courtney Hooker)	22-26	Oklahoma City, OK	John Legend	25	Battle Rounds
Oliv Blu	20	Flossmoor, IL	Blake Shelton ^{P}	16	11th/12th/13th Place
Olivia Eden	15	Long Valley, NJ	Niall Horan	24	Battle Rounds
Olivia Henken	25	Louisville, KY	Christina Aguilera	5	Live Playoffs
Olivia Kuper Harris	34	Manhattan, NY	John Legend	27	6th/7th/8th Place ^{I3}
Olivia Minogue	20	Lockport, IL	Niall Horan	24	Knockout Rounds
Olivia Reyes	19	Teaneck, NJ	John Legend	19	Battle Rounds
Olivia Rubini	24	Wilmington, DE	Dan + Shay ^{P}	25	Playoffs
Omar Jose Cardona	33	Orlando, FL	John Legend	22	4th Place
OneUp (Adam Bastien & Jerome Bell)	35/36	New York, NY	Kelly Clarkson	15	Battle Rounds
Orlando Dixon	24	Washington, DC	Adam Levine ^{F}	4	Knockout Rounds
Orlando Mendez	26	Miami, FL	Camila Cabello	22	Knockout Rounds
Orlando Napier	25	Los Angeles, CA	Adam Levine	2	Battle Rounds
Owen Danoff	25	Washington, D.C.	Adam Levine	10	11th Place
Pablo Herrera	31	San Diego, CA	John Legend	27	Battle Rounds
Page Mackenzie	32	Nashville, TN	Kelsea Ballerini	27	Knockout Rounds
Parijita Bastola	17	Severna Park, MD	John Legend	22	6th/7th/8th Place
Paris Winningham	32	Jacksonville, FL	Blake Shelton ^{P}	21	3rd Place
Parker McKay	29	Nashville, TN	Kelly Clarkson	21	Battle Rounds
Patrick Dodd	35	Memphis, TN	Adam Levine	4	Battle Rounds
Patrick McAloon	40	Barrington, RI	Adam Levine	16	Battle Rounds
Patrick Thomas	20	Nashville, TN	Blake Shelton	1	13th/14th/15th/16th Place
Patrick Thomson	35	Festus, MO	Shakira ^{A}	6	Playoffs
Patrique Fortson	38	Atlanta, GA	Jennifer Hudson	15	Live Playoffs
Paul Pfau	26	Myersville, MD	Pharrell Williams	8	Knockout Rounds
Paula DeAnda	24	San Antonio, TX	Blake Shelton	6	Battle Rounds
Paulina	16	Los Angeles, CA	Christina Aguilera	3	Battle Rounds
Paxton Ingram	23	Miami, FL	Blake Shelton	10	7th/8th Place
Payge Turner	27	Port of Spain	Gwen Stefani	19	Live Playoffs
Payton Lamar	23	Nashville, TN	Blake Shelton	19	Battle Rounds
Peedy Chavis	19	Lawrenceville, GA	Blake Shelton	21	Live Playoffs
Pete Mroz	45	Nashville, TN	Blake Shelton	20	Live Playoffs
Peyton Aldridge	25	Marks, MS	John Legend	22	Knockout Rounds
Peyton Kyle	26	Tampa, FL	Reba McEntire	28	Playoffs
Peyton Parker	29	Kennesaw, GA	Blake Shelton	10	Knockout Rounds
Pia Renee	37	Chicago, IL	John Legend	20	6th/7th/8th/9th Place
Pip	19	Marietta, GA	Adam Levine	2	9th/10th/11th/12th Place
Ponciano Seoane	25	San Antonio, TX	Adam Levine	11	Knockout Rounds
Presley Tennant	16	Norco, CA	Kelly Clarkson	16	Live Playoffs
Preston C. Howell	15	Pembroke Pines, FL	John Legend	17	Knockout Rounds
Preston James	16	Cheatham County, TN	Blake Shelton	11	Battle Rounds
Preston Pohl	26	Hallettsville, TX	Adam Levine	5	Live Playoffs
Pryor Baird	35	Orcutt, CA	Blake Shelton	14	5th/6th Place
Quizz Swanigan	13	North Little Rock, AR	Gwen Stefani ^{K}	12	Live Playoffs
R. Anthony	33	Tampa, FL	CeeLo Green	5	Battle Rounds
Rachel Christine Gebel	22	Delavan, WI	Blake Shelton ^{L}	23	Playoffs
Rachel Mac	15	Romeo, MI	Nick Jonas	20	4th Place
Rachel Messer	19	Fort Gay, WV	Blake Shelton	15	Battle Rounds
Rachele Nguyen	17	Lakewood, CA	Gwen Stefani	24	Knockout Rounds
RADHA	19	Jersey City, NJ	Adam Levine	15	Live Playoffs ^{N}
RaeLynn	17	Baytown, TX	Blake Shelton	2	13th/14th/15th/16th Place
Raine Stern	22	Madison, WI	Nick Jonas	20	Knockout Rounds
Ralph Edwards	30	Fresno, CA	Snoop Dogg	28	Runner-up
Raquel Castro	16	Long Island, NY	Christina Aguilera	1	13th/14th/15th/16th Place
Raquel Trinidad	23	Miami, FL	Ariana Grande	21	Live Playoffs
Ray Boudreaux	25	Lafayette, LA	Blake Shelton	5	7th/8th Place
Ray Uriel	24	Gary, IN	Chance the Rapper	23	6th/7th/8th Place
Rayshun LaMarr	33	Fort Washington, MD	Adam Levine	14	7th/8th Place
Reagan James	15	Burleson, TX	Blake Shelton	7	9th/10th Place
Reagan Strange	14	Memphis, TN	Adam Levine	15	5th/6th Place
Rebecca Brunner	22	Mason, MI	Blake Shelton	13	Battle Rounds
Rebecca Howell	18	Cochran, GA	Kelly Clarkson	16	Live Playoffs
Rebecca Loebe	27	Atlanta, GA	Adam Levine	1	Battle Rounds
Rebekah Samarin	20	Murrieta, CA	Adam Levine	7	Knockout Rounds
Red Marlow	40	Dickson, TN	Blake Shelton	13	4th Place
Regina Love	51	Atlanta, GA	Gwen Stefani ^{A}	9	Live Playoffs
Reid Umstattd	34	Austin, TX	Adam Levine	14	Live Playoffs
Reid Zingale	27	Nashville, TN	Niall Horan	24	Battle Rounds
Reina Ley	14	San Tan Valley, AZ	Camila Cabello	22	Knockout Rounds
RENZO	33	Philadelphia, PA	John Legend	27	3rd Place
Revel Day	31	Altadena, CA	Niall Horan	28	Battle Rounds
Ria Eaton	19	Billerica, MA	Blake Shelton	6	Battle Rounds
Ricardo Moreno	25	Tracy, CA	Michael Bublé	27	Battle Rounds ^{R}
Ricky Braddy	36	Nashville, TN	Blake Shelton	17	Live Playoffs
Ricky Duran	29	Worcester, MA	Blake Shelton	17 ^{V5}	Runner-up
Ricky Manning	19	Cape Coral, FL	Gwen Stefani ^{G}	7	Live Playoffs
Riley Biederer	19	Atlanta, GA	Pharrell Williams ^{H2}	9	Live Playoffs
Riley Elmore	16	West Dundee, IL	Adam Levine	11	Live Playoffs
Rio Doyle	16	Adrian, MI	John Legend	20	Knockout Rounds
Rio Souma	28	Detroit, MI	John Legend	19	Battle Rounds
Rivers Grayson	27	Muscle Shoals, AL	John Legend	25	Battle Rounds
Rizzi Myers	29	Nashville, TN	Kelly Clarkson	16	Battle Rounds
RJ Collins	18	Chicago, IL	Alicia Keys	12	Battle Rounds
RLETTO	27	Orlando, FL	Chance the Rapper	25	Playoffs
Rob Cole	34	Pembroke, NC	Michael Bublé	28 ^{V19}	Playoffs
Rob Taylor	22	Donaldsonville, LA	Christina Aguilera	8	9th/10th Place
Robert Hunter	33	Garner, NC	Kelsea Ballerini	27	Battle Rounds
Rod Stokes	35	Moss Point, MS	Kelly Clarkson ^{B} ^{A2}	16	5th/6th Place
Roderick Chambers	38	Miami, FL	Nick Jonas	18	Live Playoffs
Ronnie Wilson	28	Liberty, SC	John Legend	25	Battle Rounds
Rose Short	34	Killeen, TX	Gwen Stefani	17	4th Place
Ross Clayton	33	McLoud, OK	Niall Horan	23	Playoffs
Rowan Grace	17	Rapid City, SD	Blake Shelton ^{H}	22	9th/10th Place
Rowdy Shea	23	Bowling Green, KY	Gwen Stefani	26	Battle Rounds
Royce Lovett	30	Tallahassee, FL	Gwen Stefani	17	Knockout Rounds
Ruby Leigh	16	Foley, MO	Reba McEntire	24	Runner-up
RUDI	28	San Antonio, TX	Gwen Stefani	24	Playoffs ^{N}
Rudy Parris	46	Visalia, CA	Blake Shelton	3	Knockout Rounds
Ryan Argast	30	Plainfield, IL	Dan + Shay	25	Battle Rounds
Ryan Berg	27	Dallas, TX	Gwen Stefani	19	Knockout Rounds
Ryan Coleman	25	Chalfant, PA	Dan + Shay	25	Battle Rounds
Ryan Gallagher	31	Ada Township, MI	Kelly Clarkson	19	Disqualified ^{N3}
Ryan Innes	31	Provo, UT	Usher	4	Knockout Rounds
Ryan Jirovec	28	McAllen, TX	Blake Shelton	3	Battle Rounds
Ryan Mitchell	25	Los Angeles, CA	Reba McEntire	28	Playoffs ^{R2}
Ryan Quinn	25	Westmoreland, NY	Christina Aguilera ^{A}	10	Live Playoffs
Ryan Scripps	24	San Jose, CA	Blake Shelton	13	Battle Rounds
Ryan Sill	20	Sterling, VA	Gwen Stefani	7	6th/7th/8th Place
Ryan Whyte Maloney	33	Traverse City, MI	Blake Shelton	6	Playoffs
Ryleigh Modig	18	Spencer, MA	John Legend ^{L}	20	Live Playoffs
Ryleigh Plank	20	Fort Myers, FL	Ariana Grande	21	12th/13th Place
Ryley Tate Wilson	15	Montgomery, AL	Niall Horan	23	6th/7th/8th Place ^{N4}
Sa'Rayah	28	Chicago, IL	Alicia Keys ^{J}	11	12th Place
Sabrina Dias	26	Newark, NJ	John Legend	21	Knockout Rounds
Sadie Bass	25	Bath, MI	Gwen Stefani	22	Battle Rounds
Sadie Dahl	20	Draper, UT	Niall Horan ^{AA}	28	Knockout Rounds
Sam Behymer	25	Morgan Mill, TX	Adam Levine	6	Battle Rounds
Sam Cerniglia	25	Chicago, IL	Blake Shelton	5	Battle Rounds
Sam James	26	Worcester, MA	Adam Levine	3 ^{V}	Knockout Rounds
Sam Robbins	21	Portsmouth, NH	Kelsea Ballerini	15	Comeback Stage
Sam Stacy	27	Lincoln, NE	Blake Shelton	19	Battle Rounds
Samantha Howell	19	Virginia Beach, VA	Kelly Clarkson	18	Knockout Rounds ^{N3}
Samara Brown	32	Bronx, NY	John Legend	21	Knockout Rounds ^{N3}
Sammie Zonana	24	Austin, TX	Gwen Stefani	12	Battle Rounds
Samuel Harness	27	Fort Wayne, IN	John Legend	21	Live Playoffs
Samuel Mouton	19	Fort Collins, CO	Adam Levine	3	Battle Rounds
Samuel WILCO	39	Fort Knox, KY	Nick Jonas	18	Battle Rounds
SandyRedd	35	Chicago, IL	Jennifer Hudson ^{L}	15	12th/13th Place ^{N}
Sara Collins	18	Baton Rouge, LA	Kelly Clarkson	18	Battle Rounds
Sara Oromchi	18	San Jose, CA	Blake Shelton	1	Battle Rounds
Sarah Golden	27	Houston, TX	CeeLo Green	2	Battle Rounds
Sarah Grace	15	Houston, TX	Kelly Clarkson	15	7th/8th Place ^{N}
Sarah Potenza	34	Smithfield, RI	Blake Shelton	8	Live Playoffs
Sarah Simmons	22	Birmingham, AL	Adam Levine	4	7th/8th Place
Sasha Allen	30	New York, NY	Shakira ^{A}	4	4th/5th Place
Sasha Hurtado	18	Dallas, GA	John Legend ^{U} ^{H2}	22	Live Playoffs
Savanna Chestnut	25	Americus, KS	Blake Shelton	20	Battle Rounds
Savanna Woods	26	Stanwood, WA	Kelly Clarkson	20	Knockout Rounds ^{N3}
Savannah Berry	17	Houston, TX	Blake Shelton	4	Knockout Rounds
Savannah Brister	17	Memphis, TN	Bebe Rexha ^{P}	16	Comeback Stage ^{Q}
Savannah Leighton	16	Spring Garden, AL	Gwen Stefani	12	Battle Rounds
Sawyer Fredericks	16	Newtown, CT	Pharrell Williams	8	Winner
Selkii	19	Durban, South Africa	Blake Shelton	16	Live Playoffs ^{N2}
Sera Hill	24	Atlanta, GA	Christina Aguilera	2	21st/22nd/23rd/24th Place
Serabee	34	Mississippi	Blake Shelton	1	Battle Rounds
Serenity Arce	16	Jupiter, FL	Chance the Rapper	25 ^{V16}	6th/7th/8th/9th Place
Shadale Johnson	29	Douglasville, GA	John Legend	21	12th/13th Place
Shalyah Fearing	15	Hudson, FL	Adam Levine ^{D} ^{G2}	10	7th/8th Place
Shan Scott	28	Highland Falls, NY	Reba McEntire	28	Battle Rounds
Shana Halligan	44	Los Angeles, CA	Alicia Keys	14	Battle Rounds
Shane Q	28	Sacramento, CA	Kelly Clarkson	17	9th/10th Place
Sharane Calister	24	Des Moines, IA	Adam Levine ^{K}	14	11th Place
Shawn Smith	32	Utica, NY	CeeLo Green	5	Battle Rounds
Shawn Sounds	33	Houston, TX	John Legend	16	5th/6th Place
Shawna P	45	Orange Beach, AL	Shakira	4	Knockout Rounds
Sheena Brook	33	Fort Myers Beach, FL	Adam Levine	12	Battle Rounds
Sheer Element (Jej Vinson, Izzy Kaye, and Tabon Ward)	24-26	Los Angeles, CA	Kelly Clarkson	23	Battle Rounds
Shelbie Z.	21	Jasper, AL	Blake Shelton	5	Live Playoffs
Shelby Brown	16	Elberta, AL	Adam Levine	9	7th/8th/9th Place
Shi'Ann Jones	15	Bowling Green, KY	Jennifer Hudson	13	9th/10th Place
Shilo Gold	26	Denver, CO	Miley Cyrus	13	Battle Rounds
Shye	17	Glen Cove, NY	Michael Bublé	26	Runner-up
Siahna Im	15	Auburn, WA	Pharrell Williams	9	Knockout Rounds
Sid Kingsley	37	Richmond, VA	Blake Shelton ^{P} ^{L2}	19	Live Playoffs
Simone Gundy	16	Arlington, TX	Adam Levine	11	Live Playoffs
Simone Marijic	20	Los Angeles, CA	Michael Bublé ^{CC}	27	Knockout Rounds
Sisaundra Lewis	44	Orlando, FL	Blake Shelton	6	6th/7th/8th Place
Skylar Alyvia Mayton	15	Ada, MI	Kelly Clarkson	19	Battle Rounds
Sloane Simon	19	Pittsburgh, PA	Michael Bublé ^{H}	26	Playoffs ^{N}
Sofronio Vasquez	31	Mindanao, Philippines	Michael Bublé	26	Winner
SOLsong	28	Saginaw, MI	John Legend	22	Battle Rounds
Sonic	23	San Francisco, CA	Christina Aguilera	8	Live Playoffs
Sophia Bollman	18	Norco, CA	Miley Cyrus	13	Battle Rounds
Sophia Bromberg	16	San Rafael, CA	Ariana Grande	21	Battle Rounds
Sophia Hoffman	19	Chula Vista, CA	Niall Horan	24 ^{V18}	Battle Rounds
Sophia Urista	31	New York, NY	Miley Cyrus	11	Live Playoffs
Sorelle (Madison, Juliana, and Bella Heichel)	15-21	Lexington, OH	Chance the Rapper	23	4th Place
Spensha Baker	24	San Antonio, TX	Blake Shelton	14	4th Place
Stee	34	Bluffton, SC	Gwen Stefani ^{P}	24	Playoffs
Stephan Marcellus	26	Englewood, NJ	Miley Cyrus ^{M}	13	Knockout Rounds
Stephanie Anne Johnson	29	Tacoma, WA	Christina Aguilera ^{C2}	5	Live Playoffs
Stephanie Rice	27	Texarkana, TX	Alicia Keys ^{H}	12	11th Place
Stephanie Skipper	33	Nashville, TN	Adam Levine	14	Battle Rounds
Steve Knill	37	San Francisco, CA	Kelly Clarkson	17	Battle Rounds
Steve Memmolo	35	Boston, MA	Adam Levine	15	Live Playoffs
Steven McMorran	40	Little Rock, AR	Camila Cabello	22	Knockout Rounds ^{N3}
Stevie Jo	19	Tyler, TX	Usher	6	Playoffs
Suede Lacy	29	Dallas, TX	Snoop Dogg	26	Battle Rounds
Sugar Joans	24	Los Angeles, CA	Pharrell Williams ^{H}	7	11th/12th Place
Summer Schappell	21	Redding, CA	Gwen Stefani	9	Knockout Rounds
Sundance Head	37	Porter, TX	Blake Shelton	11	Winner
Suzanna Choffel	32	Austin, TX	Blake Shelton	3	Knockout Rounds
Sydney Paige Kronmiller	25	Ogden, UT	Camila Cabello	22	Battle Rounds
Sydney Millevoi	23	Secaucus, NJ	John Legend	29	5th/6th/7th/8th/9th Place
Sydney Rhame	16	Decatur, GA	Pharrell Williams	9	Battle Rounds
Sydney Sterlace	15	Buffalo, NY	Gwen Stefani	26	3rd Place
Sylvia Yacoub	19	Alexandria	Christina Aguilera	3	9th/10th Place
Tae Lewis	31	Goldsboro, NC	Dan + Shay ^{Y}	25	6th/7th/8th/9th Place
Talakai	34	Sacramento, CA	John Legend	24	Battle Rounds
Talia Smith	29	Queens, NY	Niall Horan	23	Battle Rounds
Talon Cardon	18	Pleasant Grove, UT	John Legend	16	Battle Rounds
Tamar Davis	28	Houston, TX	Christina Aguilera	10	Live Playoffs
Tamara Chauniece	23	Wortham, TX	CeeLo Green	5	Live Playoffs
Tamara Jade	30	Bowie, MD	John Legend	19	6th/7th/8th/9th Place
Tanner Frick	26	Manchester, TN	Michael Bublé ^{Y}	26	Withdrew
Tanner Fussell	28	Nashville, TN	Blake Shelton	22	Battle Rounds
Tanner Gomes	28	Yuma, AZ	Kelly Clarkson	19	Live Playoffs
Tanner Howe	29	Long Beach, CA	Gwen Stefani	22	Battle Rounds
Tanner James	19	Provo, UT	Usher	6	Battle Rounds
Tanner Linford	17	Kaysville, UT	Blake Shelton	7 ^{V5}	Knockout Rounds
Tanner Massey	19	Chocktaw, OK	Gwen Stefani ^{W}	24	10th/11th/12th Place
Tarra Layne	30	Pittsburgh, PA	Blake Shelton	11	Battle Rounds
Tarralyn Ramsey	31	Jacksonville, FL	Christina Aguilera	1	Battle Rounds
Taryn Papa	30	Nashville, TN	Blake Shelton	19	Live Playoffs ^{N3}
Tasha Jessen	20	Colorado Springs, CO	Niall Horan ^{B}	23	Playoffs
Tate Brusa	16	Salt Lake City, UT	Nick Jonas	18	Knockout Rounds
Tate Renner	24	Nashville, TN	Reba McEntire	26	Knockout Rounds
Tatum Scott	22	Nashville, TN	John Legend ^{CC}	27	Knockout Rounds
Tawnya Reynolds	32	Ruidoso, NM	Shakira	4	Knockout Rounds
Tayler Green	27	Los Angeles, CA	Kelly Clarkson	18	Knockout Rounds
Taylor Alexander	25	Flowery Branch, GA	Adam Levine	12	Battle Rounds
Taylor Beckham	17	Dallas, TX	Blake Shelton ^{F}	4	Knockout Rounds
Taylor Brashears	21	Nashville, TN	Blake Shelton	7	Live Playoffs
Taylor Deneen	23	Midwest City, OK	John Legend	24	Playoffs ^{N}
Taylor Phelan	25	Sherman, TX	Adam Levine ^{G}	7	Live Playoffs
Taylor John Williams	23	Portland, OR	Gwen Stefani	7	5th Place
Teana Boston	16	Stockton, CA	Kelly Clarkson	14	Battle Rounds
Teo Ramdel	34	Tijuana, Mexico	Niall Horan	28	Knockout Rounds
Teresa Guidry	21	Rock Hill, SC	Blake Shelton	10	Battle Rounds
Terisa Griffin	42	Chicago, IL	CeeLo Green ^{B}	3	Knockout Rounds
Terrence Cunningham	26	Washington, D.C.	Alicia Keys	14	Live Playoffs
Terry McDermott	35	Aberdeen	Blake Shelton	3	Runner-up
Tess Boyer	21	Glen Carbon, IL	Shakira ^{F} ^{B2}	6	9th/10th Place
Tessanne Chin	27	Kingston	Adam Levine	5	Winner
The Bundys (Megan, Katey, and Ryan Bundy)	25-31	Cincinnati, OH	Kelly Clarkson	16	Live Cross Battle Rounds
The Cunningham Sisters (Macie and Marie Cunningham)	16/14	Hamilton, OH	Kelly Clarkson	21	Knockout Rounds
The Dryes (Derek and Katelyn Drye)	36/33	Nashville, TN	Blake Shelton	22	Knockout Rounds ^{N3}
The Joy Reunion (Rob Easley, Gentry Monreal, and Neil Morrison)	39-42	Redlands, CA	Blake Shelton	21	Battle Rounds
THE LiNE (Hailey Steele & Leland Grant)	30/30	Nashville, TN	Christina Aguilera	2	Battle Rounds
The Marilynds (Lindsay and Kasey Staniszewski)	34/31	La Plata, MD	John Legend	22	Knockout Rounds ^{N3}
The Morgan Twins (Rhian & Cara Morgan)	29/29	Rochester, NY	Blake Shelton	4	Battle Rounds
The Shields Brothers (Tristen & Rory)	28/29	Rixeyville, VA	CeeLo Green	2	Battle Rounds
The Swon Brothers (Colton & Zach Swon)	24/27	Muskogee, OK	Blake Shelton	4	3rd Place
The Thompson Sisters (Tori & Taylor Thompson)	17/19	Santa Maria, CA	CeeLo Green	1	9th/10th/11th/12th Place
Thunderstorm Artis	23	Haleiwa, HI	Nick Jonas ^{P}	18	3rd Place
Tia DuRant	32	Sumter, SC	Kelly Clarkson	29	Knockout Rounds
Tiana Goss	29	Los Angeles, CA	Chance the Rapper ^{W}	23 ^{V17}	Knockout Rounds
Tim Atlas	26	San Jose, CA	Pharrell Williams ^{H}	9	Knockout Rounds
Tim Mahoney	39	Minneapolis, MN	Adam Levine	1	Battle Rounds
Timyra-Joi	15	San Diego, CA	Christina Aguilera	5	Battle Rounds
Tinika Wyatt	50	San Diego, CA	Kelsea Ballerini ^{A}	27	Playoffs ^{R}
Tish Haynes Keys	37	St. Louis, MO	Kelly Clarkson ^{A}	14	Live Playoffs ^{N}
T.J. Wilkins	23	Los Angeles, CA	Usher	6	11th/12th Place
Tje Austin	27	Austin, TX	CeeLo Green	1	Battle Rounds
Todd Kessler	30	Chicago, IL	CeeLo Green	3	Battle Rounds
Todd Michael Hall	50	Saginaw, MI	Blake Shelton	18	Knockout Rounds ^{N3}
Todd Tilghman	42	Meridian, MS	Blake Shelton	18	Winner
Toia Jones	29	Montgomery, AL	Adam Levine ^{G}	7	Knockout Rounds
Tom Nitti	31	New Hartford, NY	Reba McEntire	24	Withdrew ^{N}
Tommy Edwards	27	Bigfork, MT	Blake Shelton	21	Battle Rounds
Toneisha Harris	44	Roswell, GA	Blake Shelton	18	Runner-up
Toni Lorene	28	Houston, TX	Snoop Dogg	28	Playoffs
Tony Lucca	35	Waterford, MI	Adam Levine	2	3rd Place
Tony Vincent	38	New York, NY	CeeLo Green	2	17th/18th/19th/20th Place
Tonya Boyd-Cannon	35	New Orleans, LA	Adam Levine	8	Live Playoffs
Tori Miller	26	Siloam Springs, AR	Gwen Stefani	19	Battle Rounds
Tori Templet	24	Atlanta, GA	Adam Levine	27	Battle Rounds
Torion Sellers	26	Atlanta, GA	Michael Bublé	26	Battle Rounds
Torre Blake	30	Austin, TX	Snoop Dogg	26	Knockout Rounds
Travis Ewing	23	Lafayette, LA	Blake Shelton ^{G}	8	Knockout Rounds
Treeva Gibson	16	Frederick, MD	Christina Aguilera	8	Knockout Rounds
Trevin Hunte	18	Queens, NY	CeeLo Green	3	4th Place
Trevon Dawson	17	Cole Camp, MO	Adam Levine	27	Knockout Rounds
Trevor Davis	32	San Diego, CA	Blake Shelton	4	Battle Rounds
Trey O'Dell	31	Fayetteville, AR	Christina Aguilera ^{B}	10	Knockout Rounds
Trey Rose	27	Hugo, OK	Adam Levine	16	Battle Rounds
Trinity Giselle	25	Stamford, CT	Michael Bublé	28	Playoffs ^{N3}
Troy Ramey	32	New York, NY	Gwen Stefani	12	12th Place
Troy Ritchie	21	Trabuco Canyon, CA	Gwen Stefani	7	Knockout Rounds
Tsola	27	Silver Spring, MD	Reba McEntire	26	Battle Rounds
TSoul	29	Richmond, VA	Blake Shelton	12	7th/8th Place
Tyke James	17	Laie, HI	Adam Levine	15	12th/13th Place
Tyler Dickerson	21	Denham Springs, LA	Blake Shelton	9	Battle Rounds
Tyler Kae	23	Olympia, WA	Adam Levine	27	Battle Rounds
Tyler Robinson	20	Folsom, CA	Blake Shelton	1	Battle Rounds
Tyshawn Colquitt	23	Cincinnati, OH	Jennifer Hudson	15	Knockout Rounds
Val T. Webb	43	Birmingham, AL	John Legend ^{X}	25	Knockout Rounds
Valarie Collins-Harding	41	Muskogee, OK	John Legend	22	Knockout Rounds
Valerie Ponzio	32	El Paso, TX	Blake Shelton	12	Battle Rounds
Van Andrew	29	Cooper, TX	Gwen Stefani	19	Knockout Rounds
Vance Smith	22	Detroit, MI	Christina Aguilera	8	Battle Rounds
Vanessa Ferguson	31	Greensboro, NC	Alicia Keys	12	7th/8th Place
Vaughn Mugol	27	Beaumont, TX	Ariana Grande	21	Live Playoffs ^{O2}
VEDO	19	Atlanta, GA	Usher	4	11th/12th Place
Vicci Martinez	26	Tacoma, WA	CeeLo Green	1	3rd/4th Place
Victor Solomon	22	Peoria, IL	John Legend	20	5th Place
Viktor Király	31	Budapest	Gwen Stefani ^{A}	9	Live Playoffs
Vinya Chhabra	15	East Brunswick, NJ	Reba McEntire	28	Battle Rounds
WADE	19	Harvest, AL	CeeLo Green	2	Battle Rounds
Walker Wilson	24	Alcoa, TN	Blake Shelton	23	Knockout Rounds
Warren Stone	31	Hannah, SC	Adam Levine	4	Knockout Rounds
Wé McDonald	17	Paterson, NJ	Alicia Keys	11	3rd Place
Wendy Moten	56	Memphis, TN	Blake Shelton	21	Runner-up
Whitney & Shannon (Whitney Sim & Shannon Sim-Bates)	25/23	Austin, TX	Alicia Keys	11	Knockout Rounds
Whitney Fenimore	28	Tulsa, OK	Adam Levine ^{J2}	13	Playoffs ^{I2}
Whitney Myer	25	Reno, NV	Adam Levine	2	Battle Rounds
WILKES	33	Waleska, GA	Blake Shelton	14	Live Playoffs
Will Breman	25	Santa Barbara, CA	John Legend	17	7th/8th Place
Will Champlin	30	Los Angeles, CA	Adam Levine ^{D2}	5	3rd Place
William Alexander	16	Staten Island, NY	Reba McEntire	25	Battle Rounds
Willie Gomez	37	Miami, FL	John Legend	24	Battle Rounds
Worth The Wait (Tara, Mia Makana, and Jacy Matthews)	14-47	Gadsden, AL	Blake Shelton	19	Live Playoffs
Wyatt Michael	24	Fredericksburg, VA	Kelly Clarkson	21	Battle Rounds
Wyatt Rivers	22	Durham, NC	Kelsea Ballerini	15	Comeback Stage
Xavier Trinity Cornell	18	Los Angeles, CA	Kelly Clarkson	21	Knockout Rounds
Xenia	16	Temecula, CA	Blake Shelton	1	5th/6th/7th/8th Place
YoshiHanaa	36	Sanford, FL	Snoop Dogg	28	Playoffs
Zach Bridges	29	Pearl, MS	Blake Shelton	17	Knockout Rounds
Zach Day	25	Stearns, KY	John Legend	18	Battle Rounds
Zach Newbould	19	Northborough, MA	Camila Cabello	22	Battle Rounds
Zach Seabaugh	16	Marietta, GA	Blake Shelton	9	5th/6th Place
Zae Romeo	21	McKinney, TX	Kelly Clarkson ^{S}	20	Live Playoffs
Zan Fiskum	22	Seattle, WA	John Legend	18	6th/7th/8th/9th Place
Zania Alaké	34	Detroit, MI	John Legend	20	Live Playoffs
Zaxai	30	Brooklyn, NY	Kelly Clarkson ^{M}	15	Live Playoffs
Zeya Rae	23	Stockton, CA	Reba McEntire	25	Knockout Rounds
Zoe Levert	20	New Orleans, LA	John Legend	25	10th/11th/12th Place
Zoe Upkins	16	Nashville, TN	John Legend	17	Knockout Rounds ^{N3}

== Notes ==
A Originally from Adam Levine's team.
A2 Briefly from Adam Levine's team.
AA Originally from Snoop Dogg's team.
AA2 Briefly from Snoop Dogg's team.
B Originally from Blake Shelton's team.
B2 Briefly from Blake Shelton's team.
BB Originally from Michael Bublé's team.
BB2 Briefly from Michael Bublé's team.
C Originally from CeeLo Green's team.
C2 Briefly from CeeLo Green's team.
CC Originally from Kelsea Ballerini's team.
CC2 Briefly from Kelsea Ballerini's team.
D Originally from Christina Aguilera's team.
D2 Briefly from Christina Aguilera's team.
E Originally from Shakira's team.
F Originally from Usher's team.
G Originally from Pharrell Williams's team.
G2 Briefly from Pharrell Williams's team.
H Originally from Gwen Stefani's team.
H2 Briefly from Gwen Stefani's team.
I Was originally eliminated in Battles Rounds but received the Coach Comeback.
I2 Was originally eliminated in Knockout Rounds but received the Coach Comeback or Super Save.
I3 Was originally eliminated in Playoffs but received the Super Save.
J Originally from Miley Cyrus's team.
J2 Briefly from Miley Cyrus's team.
K Originally from Alicia Keys's team.
K2 Briefly from Alicia Keys's team.
L Originally from Kelly Clarkson's team.
L2 Briefly from Kelly Clarkson's team.
M Originally from Jennifer Hudson's team.
M2 Briefly from Jennifer Hudson's team.
N Lost the Knockout Rounds and was saved by his/her coach.
N2 Lost the Live Cross Battles and was saved by his/her coach.
N3 Lost the Battle Rounds and was saved by his/her coach.
N4 Lost the Battle Rounds but was given the Playoff Pass by his/her coach.
O Won the artist comeback and joined another coach team.
O2 Won the artist comeback and remained in the team.
P Originally from John Legend's team.
P2 Briefly from John Legend's team.
Q Was originally eliminated in Battles Rounds but was brought back to the comeback Stage.
Q2 Was originally eliminated in Live Cross Battles but was brought back to the comeback Stage.
R Initially received no chair turns in the Blind Auditions but was given the replay button and made a team.
R2 Initially received no chair turns in the Blind Auditions but was given the "Carson Callback", auditioned again, turned at least one chair, and thus made a team.
S Originally from Nick Jonas's team.
S2 Briefly from Nick Jonas's team.
T Originally from Ariana Grande's team.
T2 Briefly from Ariana Grande's team.
U Originally from Camila Cabello's team.
U2 Briefly from Camila Cabello's team.
V Returned after failing to get a chair turn in Season 2.
V2 Returned after failing to get a chair turn in Season 3.
V3 Returned after failing to get a chair turn in Season 4.
V4 Returned after failing to get a chair turn in Season 5.
V5 Returned after failing to get a chair turn in Season 6.
V6 Returned after failing to get a chair turn in Season 8.
V7 Returned after failing to get a chair turn in Season 9.
V8 Returned after failing to get a chair turn in Season 10.
V9 Returned after failing to get a chair turn in Season 11.
V10 Returned after failing to get a chair turn in Season 12.
V11 Returned after failing to get a chair turn in Season 14.
V12 Returned after failing to get a chair turn in Season 15.
V13 Returned after failing to get a chair turn in Season 18.
V14 Returned after failing to get a chair turn in Season 19.
V15 Returned after failing to get a chair turn in Season 20.
V16 Returned after failing to get a chair turn in Season 21.
V17 Returned after failing to get a chair turn in Season 22.
V18 Returned after failing to get a chair turn in Season 23.
V19 Returned after failing to get a chair turn in Season 25.
V20 Returned after failing to get a chair turn in Season 26.
V21 Artist or Member of Duo returned after failing to get a chair turn in Season 27.
V22 Returned after failing to get a chair turn in Season 28.
W Originally from Niall Horan's team.
W2 Briefly from Niall Horan's team.
X Originally from Chance the Rapper's team.
X2 Briefly from Chance the Rapper's team.
Y Originally from Reba McEntire's team.
Y2 Briefly from Reba McEntire's team.
Z Originally from Dan + Shay's team.
Z2 Briefly from Dan + Shay's team.
