= The Voice (American TV series) season 1 =

The Voice
- Season 1
- Promotional poster featuring coaches Levine, Aguilera, Green, and Shelton
- Hosted by: Carson Daly; Alison Haislip (social media)
- Coaches: Adam Levine; CeeLo Green; Christina Aguilera; Blake Shelton
- No. of contestants: 32 artists
- Winner: Javier Colon
- Winning coach: Adam Levine
- Runner-up: Dia Frampton

Release
- Original network: NBC
- Original release: April 26 – June 29, 2011

Season chronology
- Next → Season 2

The Voice is a reality talent show. The series is part of the franchise The Voice and is based on a similar competition format in the Netherlands, The Voice of Holland. The show is hosted by Carson Daly, with Alison Haislip serving as the backstage and social networking correspondent, and the coaches, all well-known musicians, were Christina Aguilera, CeeLo Green, Maroon 5 frontman Adam Levine and Blake Shelton. The inaugural season premiered April 26, 2011, and ended on June 29, 2011, with the live finale.

Javier Colon was named the winner of the inaugural season, marking Adam Levine's first win as a coach.

== Overview ==
The series consisted of three phases: a blind audition, a battle phase, and a four-week live performance shows. Four coaches (Aguilera, Green, Levine, Shelton) each choose teams of (eight) contestants through a blind audition process. Coaches have the length of the auditioner's performance (about one minute) to decide whether to select that singer for their team; if two or more coaches want the same singer (as happened with all but one singer in the premiere episode), the artist is given an option to choose their coach. These artists will be mentored by the selected coach throughout the entire season, then compete in battle rounds followed by live performance shows and eliminations are done team-based until each coach had one artist remaining. When one remains for each coach, the four contestants compete against each other in the finale, with the winning artist receiving $100,000 and a record deal with Universal Republic Records.

== Coaches, host, and social media correspondent ==
In late February 2011, NBC began announcements of the coaches for the series. First to sign on were CeeLo Green and Adam Levine (frontman for Maroon 5). Christina Aguilera came on board in early March 2011. Blake Shelton was added as the final coach on March 7, 2011.

Carson Daly was announced as the show's official host. Alison Haislip was announced as the show's "backstage online and social media correspondent" during the live shows.

The season's advisors for Green, Levine, Aguilera and Shelton were respectively were the following:Sia, Monica, music producer Adam Blackstone and Reba McEntire.

Coaches and Host(s) of The Voice Season 1

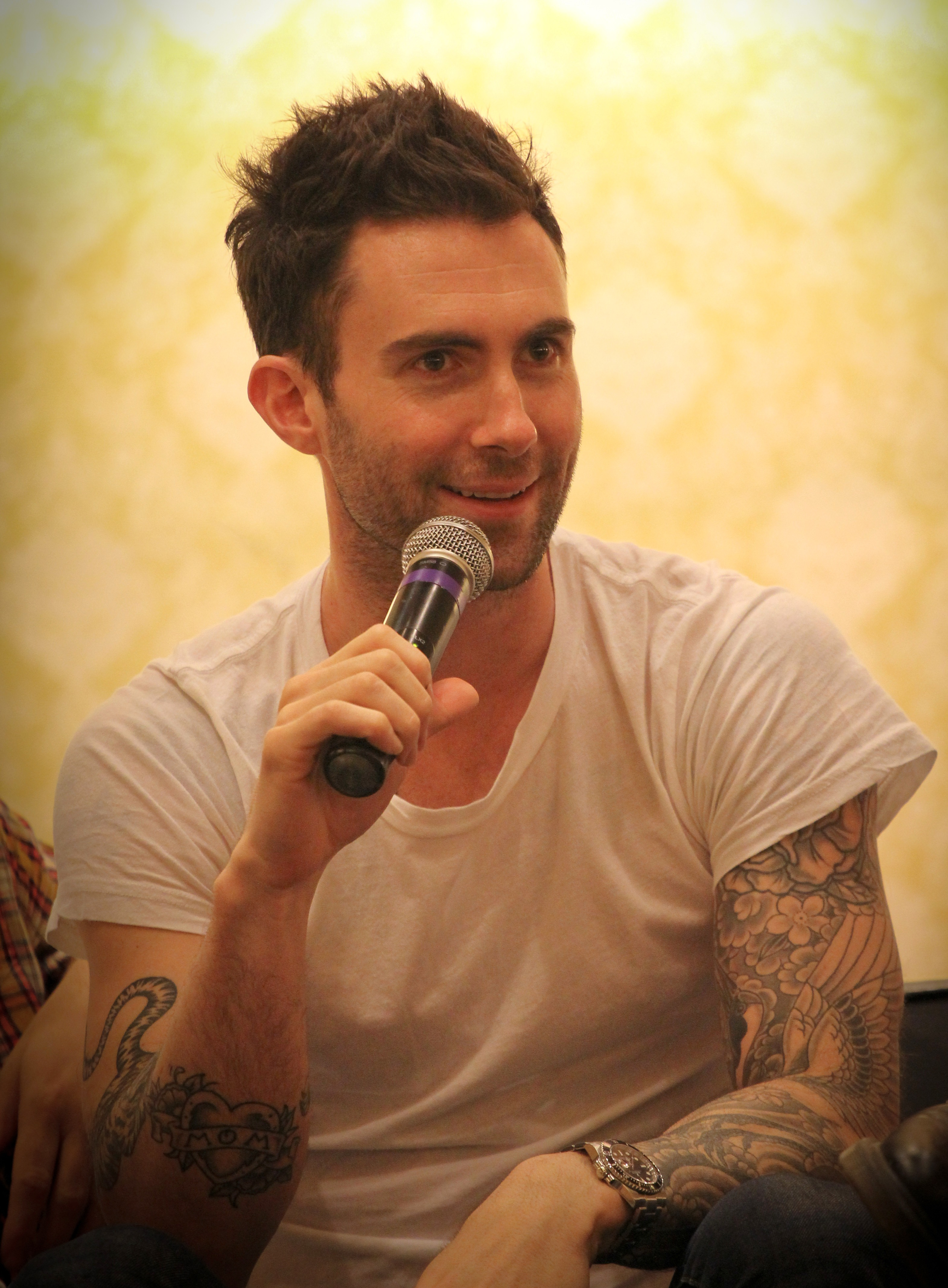
Adam Levine

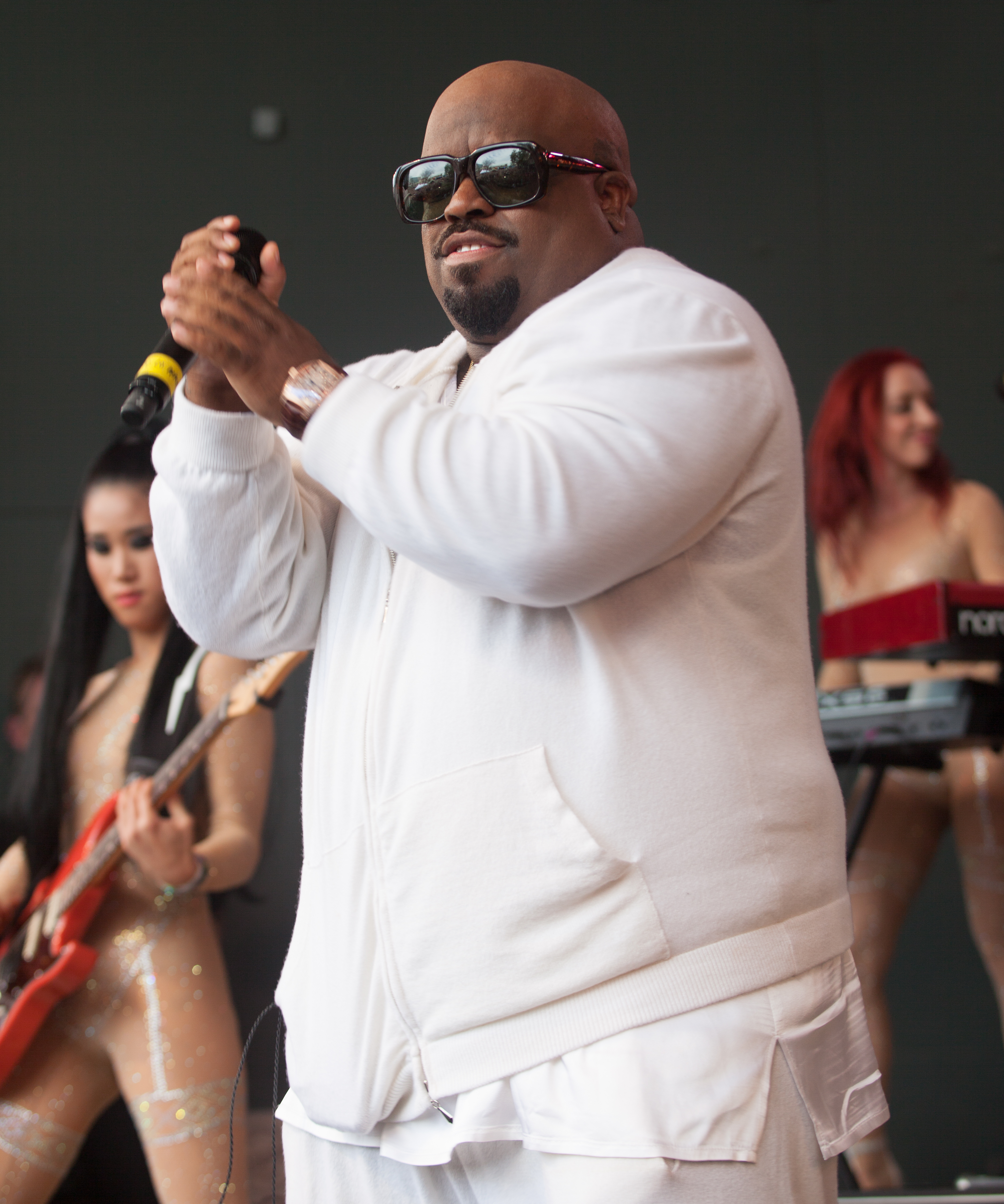
CeeLo Green

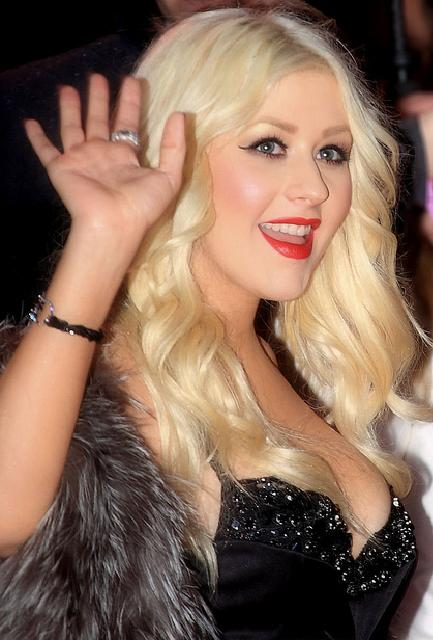
Christina Aguilera

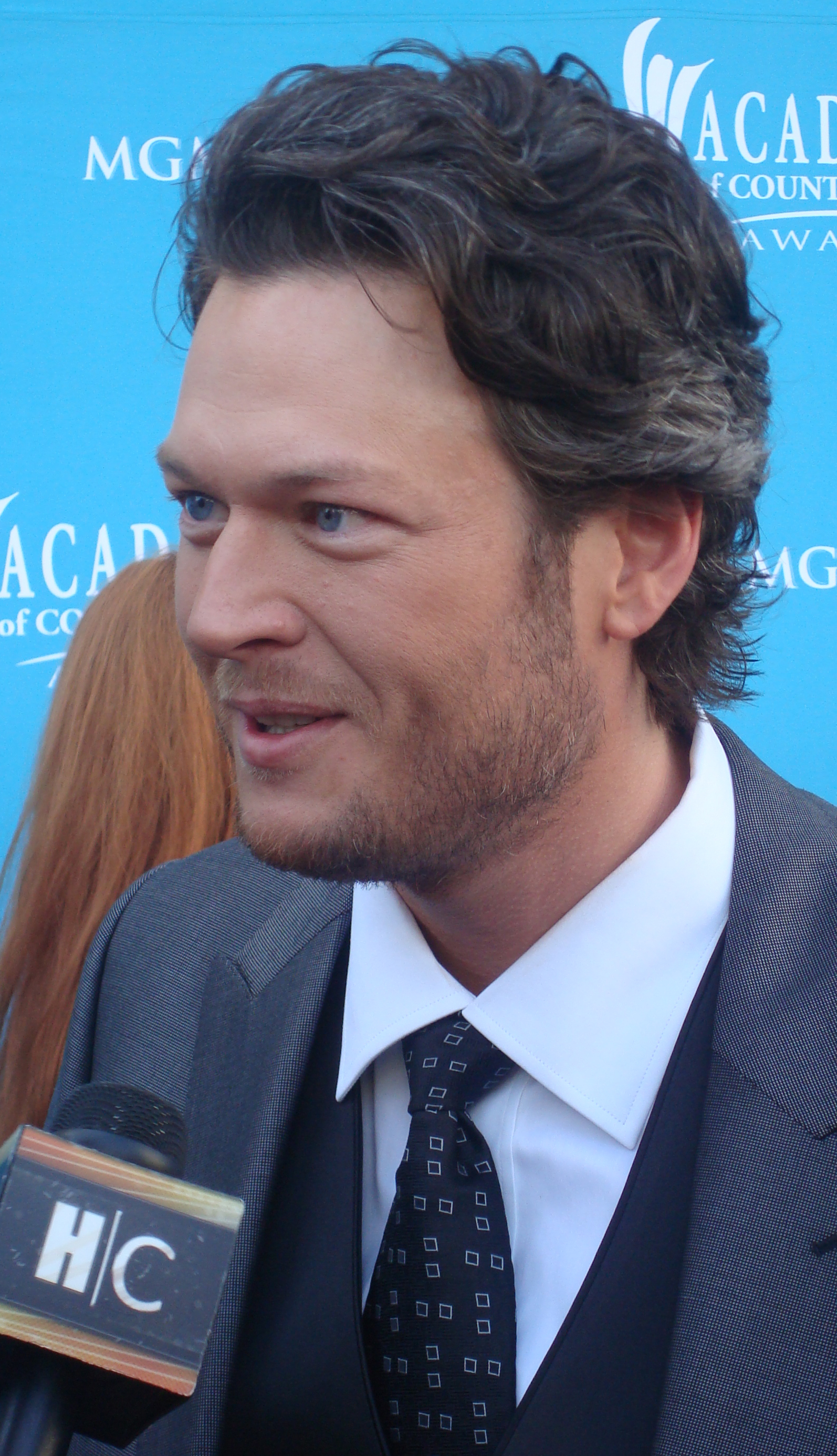
Blake Shelton

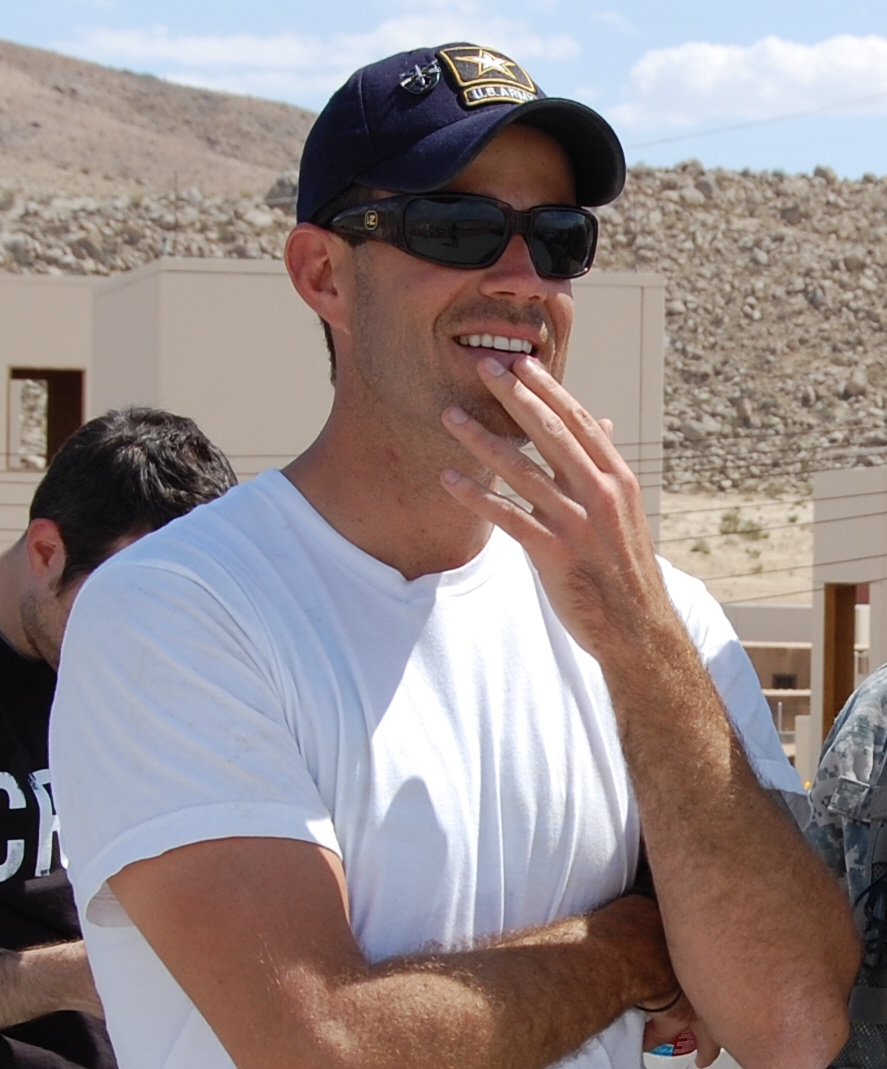
Carson Daly (Host)

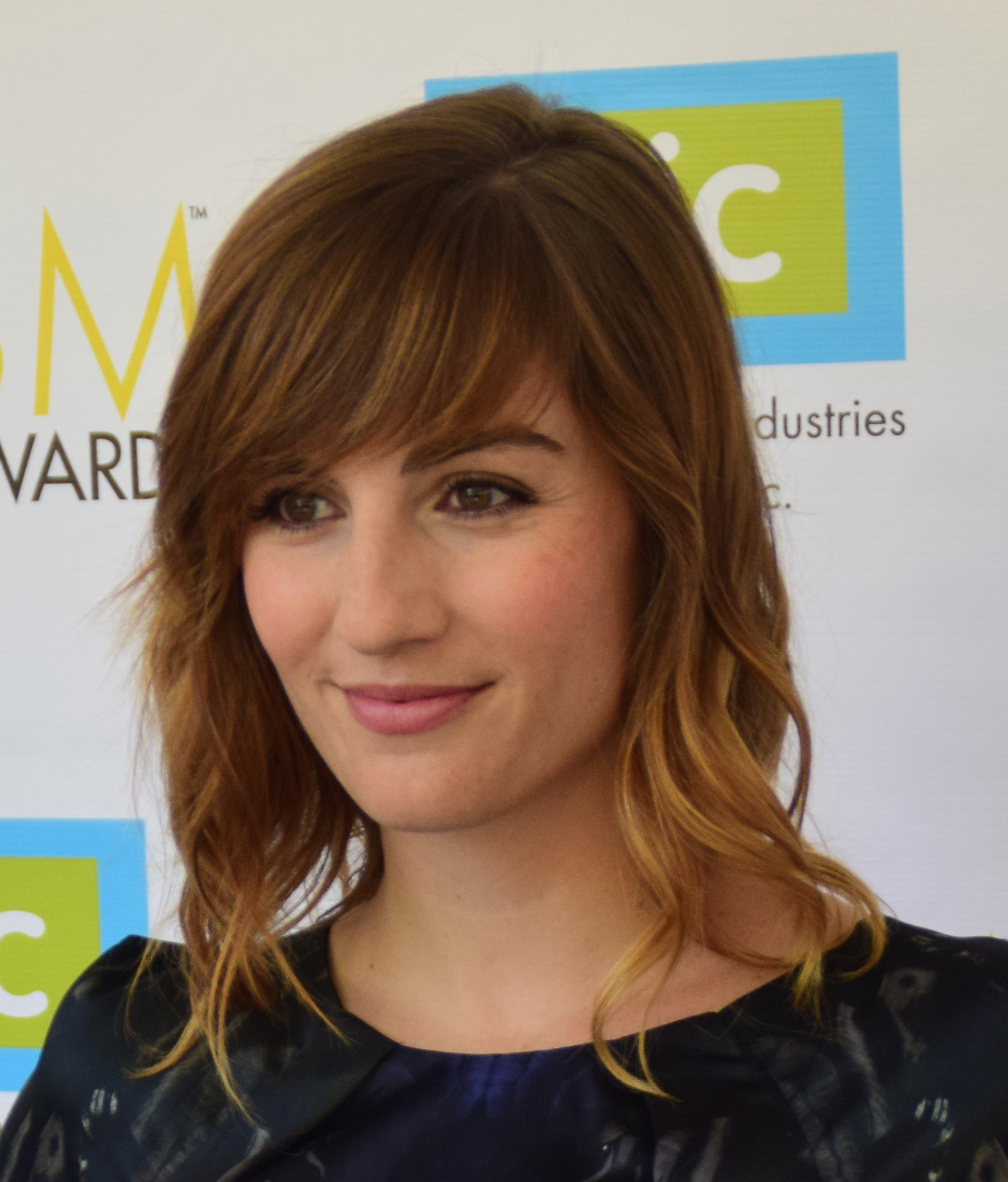
Alison Haislip (Backstage)

== Auditions ==
Contestant auditions were held in eight cities across the United States between mid-January and mid-February 2011: Chicago, New York, Miami, Nashville, Minneapolis, Austin, Los Angeles, and Seattle. Contestants were also allowed to submit an online applications, which ended on March 1, 2011. For the online auditions, contestants were required to sing one of ten preselected songs.

Cities where the auditions were held

Contestants on The Voice as revealed by airing of promotional advertisements or shows were Javier Colon, Frenchie Davis, Nakia, Lukas Rossi, Cherie Oakley, and Dia Frampton.

== Teams ==
Color key

- Winner
- Runner-up
- Third / Fourth place
- Eliminated in Live Shows
- Eliminated in the Battles

| Coaches | Top 32 Artists | | | |
|---|---|---|---|---|
| Adam Levine | | | | |
| Adam Levine | Javier Colon | Casey Weston | Devon Barley | Jeff Jenkins |
| Adam Levine | Casey Desmond | Rebecca Loebe | Tim Mahoney | Angela Wolff |
| CeeLo Green | | | | |
| CeeLo Green | Vicci Martinez | Nakia Reynoso | Curtis Grimes | The Thompson Sisters |
| CeeLo Green | Tje Austin | Niki Dawson | Kelsey Rey | Emily Valentine |
| Christina Aguilera | | | | |
| Christina Aguilera | Beverly McClellan | Frenchie Davis | Raquel Castro | Lily Elise |
| Christina Aguilera | Julia Eason | Justin Grennan | Cherie Oakley | Tarralyn Ramsey |
| Blake Shelton | | | | |
| Blake Shelton | Dia Frampton | Xenia Martinez | Jared Blake | Patrick Thomas |
| Blake Shelton | Elenowen | Sara Oromchi | Tyler Robinson | Serabee |

== Blind auditions ==
Color key

| ✔ | Coach hit his/her "I WANT YOU" button |
| | Artist defaulted to this coach's team |
| | Artist selected to join this coach's team |
| | Artist initially eliminated with no coach pressing his or her "I WANT YOU" button, but given a second chance to complete the coach's team |
| | Artist eliminated with no coach pressing his or her "I WANT YOU" button, and was not selected for the second round to complete the coach's team |

=== Episode 1 (April 26) ===
The coaches performed coach CeeLo's song, "Crazy," at the start of the show.

| Order | Artist | Age | Hometown | Song | Coach's and artist's choices | | | |
| Order | Artist | Age | Hometown | Song | Adam | CeeLo | Christina | Blake |
|---|---|---|---|---|---|---|---|---|
| 1 | Tarralyn Ramsey | 31 | Jacksonville, Florida | "Breathe" | — | ✔ | ✔ | — |
| 2 | Patrick Thomas | 20 | Nashville, Tennessee | "Live Like You Were Dying" | ✔ | ✔ | — | ✔ |
| 3 | Jared Blake | 32 | Star City, Arkansas | "Good Girls Go Bad" | — | — | — | — |
| 4 | Vicci Martinez | 26 | Tacoma, Washington | "Rolling in the Deep" | — | ✔ | ✔ | — |
| 5 | Sonia Rao | 24 | Freehold Township, New Jersey | "If I Ain't Got You" | — | — | — | — |
| 6 | Elenowen (Josh & Nicole Johnson) | Unknown | Nashville, Tennessee | "Falling Slowly" | — | ✔ | — | ✔ |
| 7 | Frenchie Davis | 31 | Los Angeles, California | "I Kissed a Girl" | — | — | ✔ | — |
| 8 | Kelsey Rey | 20 | Sebastian, Florida | "American Boy" | ✔ | ✔ | ✔ | — |
| 9 | Jeff Jenkins | 22 | Jones Creek, Texas | "Bless the Broken Road" | ✔ | ✔ | ✔ | ✔ |
| 10 | Rebecca Loebe | 27 | Atlanta, Georgia | "Come as You Are" | ✔ | — | ✔ | — |
| 11 | Joann Rizzo | 56 | Freehold Township, New Jersey | "I Say a Little Prayer" | — | — | — | — |
| 12 | Xenia | 16 | Temecula, California | "Breakeven" | — | ✔ | — | ✔ |
| 13 | Tje Austin | 27 | Austin, Texas | "Just the Way You Are" | ✔ | ✔ | — | — |
| 14 | Javier Colon | 33 | Stratford, Connecticut | "Time After Time" | ✔ | ✔ | ✔ | ✔ |
| 15 | Beverly McClellan | 41 | Fort Lauderdale, Florida | "Piece of My Heart" | ✔ | — | ✔ | — |

=== Episode 2 (May 3) ===
| Order | Artist | Age | Hometown | Song | Coach's and artist's choices | | | |
| Order | Artist | Age | Hometown | Song | Adam | CeeLo | Christina | Blake |
|---|---|---|---|---|---|---|---|---|
| 1 | Cherie Oakley | 29 | Nashville, Tennessee | "Gunpowder & Lead" | — | — | ✔ | — |
| 2 | Devon Barley | 19 | Mattapoisett, Massachusetts | "I'm Yours" | ✔ | ✔ | — | — |
| 3 | Joshua Hand | 29 | West Palm Beach, Florida | "Paparazzi" | — | — | — | — |
| 4 | Raquel Castro | 16 | Long Island, New York | "Bleeding Love" | — | — | ✔ | — |
| 5 | Emily Valentine | 23 | Hollywood, California | "Sober" | — | ✔ | — | ✔ |
| 6 | Niki Dawson | 19 | Jacksonville, Florida | "Teenage Dream" | — | ✔ | — | — |
| 7 | Sara Oromchi | 18 | San Jose, California | "Imagine" | — | — | — | ✔ |
| 8 | Tim Mahoney | 39 | Minneapolis, Minnesota | "Bring It On Home to Me" | ✔ | — | — | — |
| 9 | Julia Eason | 18 | Palos Verdes, California | "Mercy" | — | ✔ | ✔ | — |
| 10 | Angela Wolff | 25 | Metter, Georgia | "The House That Built Me" | — | — | — | — |
| 11 | Tyler Robinson | 20 | Folsom, California | "Hey, Soul Sister" | — | — | — | ✔ |
| 12 | Nakia | 36 | Austin, Texas | "Forget You" | — | ✔ | — | ✔ |
| 13 | Serabee | 34 | Mississippi | "Son of a Preacher Man" | — | — | — | ✔ |
| 14 | Casey Desmond | 25 | Boston, Massachusetts | "Born This Way" | ✔ | — | — | — |
| 15 | Justin Grennan | 30 | Enumclaw, Washington | "Drops of Jupiter" | — | — | ✔ | — |
| 16 | Casey Weston | 18 | Naples, Florida | Unknown | — | — | — | — |
| 17 | Lily Elise | 20 | San Anselmo, California | "If I Were a Boy" | — | — | — | — |
| 18 | Dia Frampton | 23 | St. George, Utah | "Bubbly" | — | ✔ | — | ✔ |
| 19 | Curtis Grimes | 25 | Gilmer, Texas | "Hillbilly Bone" | — | ✔ | — | — |
| 20 | The Thompson Sisters (Tori & Taylor Thompson) | 17 & 19 | Santa Maria, California | "Stuck Like Glue" | — | ✔ | — | — |

==== Second chance ====
At the conclusion of Episode 2, only Team CeeLo had completed his full team of eight finalists, while Teams Blake and Christina recruited with seven artists and Team Adam with only six. Selected artists eliminated previously were given a second chance to perform in the round.

| Order | Artist | Age | Hometown | Song | Coach's and artist's choices | | | |
| Order | Artist | Age | Hometown | Song | Adam | CeeLo | Christina | Blake |
|---|---|---|---|---|---|---|---|---|
| 1 | Lily Elise | 20 | San Anselmo, California | "If I Ain't Got You" | — | Team full | ✔ | — |
| 2 | Sonia Rao | 24 | Freehold Borough, New Jersey | "Chasing Pavements" | — | Team full | Team full | — |
| 3 | Jared Blake | 32 | Star City, Arkansas | "Not Ready to Make Nice" | — | Team full | Team full | ✔ |
| 4 | Casey Weston | 18 | Naples, Florida | "Stupid Boy" | ✔ | Team full | Team full | Team full |
| 5 | Angela Wolff | 25 | Metter, Georgia | "Rolling in the Deep" | ✔ | Team full | Team full | Team full |

== The Battles ==
After the Blind Auditions, each coach had eight contestants for the Battle rounds airing over four weeks, with one pair of duets from each team competing for a place in the live shows per week. The 4 coaches began narrowing down the playing field by training the contestants with the help of "trusted advisors." Each episode featured four battles consisting of pairings from within each team, with each battle concluding as the respective coach eliminated one of the two contestants; the four winners for each coach advanced to the live shows.

The trusted advisors for these episodes were the following: Adam Blackstone for Team Adam, Reba McEntire for Team Blake, Monica for Team CeeLo, and Sia for Team Christina.

Color key

| Artist won the Battle and advanced to the Live Shows |
| Artist lost the Battle and was eliminated |

| Episode | Coach | Order | Winner | Song | Loser |
|---|---|---|---|---|---|
| Episode 3 (Tuesday, May 10, 2011) | Christina Aguilera | 1 | Frenchie Davis | "Single Ladies (Put a Ring on It)" | Tarralyn Ramsey |
| Episode 3 (Tuesday, May 10, 2011) | Blake Shelton | 2 | Patrick Thomas | "Burning Love" | Tyler Robinson |
| Episode 3 (Tuesday, May 10, 2011) | Adam Levine | 3 | Casey Weston | "Leather and Lace" | Tim Mahoney |
| Episode 3 (Tuesday, May 10, 2011) | CeeLo Green | 4 | Vicci Martinez | "Perfect" | Niki Dawson |
| Episode 4 (Tuesday, May 17, 2011) | CeeLo Green | 1 | Nakia | "Closer" | Tje Austin |
| Episode 4 (Tuesday, May 17, 2011) | Blake Shelton | 2 | Jared Blake | "Ain't No Mountain High Enough" | Elenowen |
| Episode 4 (Tuesday, May 17, 2011) | Adam Levine | 3 | Javier Colon | "Stand By Me" | Angela Wolff |
| Episode 4 (Tuesday, May 17, 2011) | Christina Aguilera | 4 | Beverly McClellan | "Baba O'Riley" | Justin Grennan |
| Episode 5 (Tuesday, May 24, 2011) | Christina Aguilera | 1 | Raquel Castro | "Only Girl (In The World)" | Julia Eason |
| Episode 5 (Tuesday, May 24, 2011) | Blake Shelton | 2 | Dia Frampton | "You Can't Hurry Love" | Serabee |
| Episode 5 (Tuesday, May 24, 2011) | Adam Levine | 3 | Devon Barley | "Creep" | Rebecca Loebe |
| Episode 5 (Tuesday, May 24, 2011) | CeeLo Green | 4 | The Thompson Sisters | "Unwritten" | Kelsey Rey |
| Episode 6 (Tuesday, May 31, 2011) | Adam Levine | 1 | Jeff Jenkins | "Don't Let the Sun Go Down on Me" | Casey Desmond |
| Episode 6 (Tuesday, May 31, 2011) | Blake Shelton | 2 | Xenia | "I'll Stand by You" | Sara Oromchi |
| Episode 6 (Tuesday, May 31, 2011) | Christina Aguilera | 3 | Lily Elise | "Since U Been Gone" | Cherie Oakley |
| Episode 6 (Tuesday, May 31, 2011) | CeeLo Green | 4 | Curtis Grimes | "Need You Now" | Emily Valentine |

== Live shows ==
=== Week 1 (June 7 & 13) ===
For the first two live shows, two teams performed on one performance show for the public votes and received the results on the following week's live show. Voting commenced after the broadcast of each live show on Tuesday and stayed open until 10 AM EDT the following Monday.

Results were announced on the following week's live show where the only artist with the highest votes advanced, and a second artist was saved by the coach out of the remaining three artists. The first week of live shows featured Team Christina and Team Blake.

Color key

| Artist was saved by the public's vote |
| Artist was saved by his/her coach |
| Artist was eliminated |

| Order | Coach | Artist | Song | Result |
|---|---|---|---|---|
| 1 | Christina Aguilera | Raquel Castro | "Blow" | Eliminated |
| 2 | Blake Shelton | Jared Blake | "Use Somebody" | Eliminated |
| 3 | Christina Aguilera | Beverly McClellan | "I'm the Only One" | Public's vote |
| 4 | Blake Shelton | Dia Frampton | "Heartless" | Public's vote |
| 5 | Blake Shelton | Xenia | "Price Tag" | Blake's choice |
| 6 | Christina Aguilera | Lily Elise | "Big Girls Don't Cry" | Eliminated |
| 7 | Blake Shelton | Patrick Thomas | "I Hope You Dance" | Eliminated |
| 8 | Christina Aguilera | Frenchie Davis | "When Love Takes Over" | Christina's Choice |

Non-competition performances
| Order | Performers | Song |
|---|---|---|
| 1 | The Voice coaches | "Bohemian Rhapsody", "We Will Rock You", "We Are the Champions" |
| 2 | Christina Aguilera and her 4 finalists (Raquel Castro, Beverly McClellan, Lily Elise, and Frenchie Davis) | "Lady Marmalade" |
| 3 | Blake Shelton and his 4 finalists (Jared Blake, Dia Frampton, Xenia, and Patrick Thomas) | "This Love" |

=== Week 2 (June 14 & 20) ===
Similar to the past week, voting proceeded as before; following the episode's conclusion and continuing until 10 AM EDT June 20, two artists from each of the teams advanced by either public vote or the artist's respective coach. The second live shows featured Team Adam and Team CeeLo.

The eliminated contestants from this week released a studio performance that was not performed previously.

- Tori & Taylor Thompson - "Cowboy Take Me Away"
- Jeff Jenkins - "I Don't Want to Miss a Thing"
- Devon Barley - "Animal"
- Curtis Grimes - "Colder Weather"

| Order | Coach | Artist | Song | Result |
|---|---|---|---|---|
| 1 | CeeLo Green | The Thompson Sisters | "Boogie Woogie Bugle Boy" | Eliminated |
| 2 | Adam Levine | Casey Weston | "Black Horse and the Cherry Tree" | Adam's Choice |
| 3 | CeeLo Green | Vicci Martinez | "Jolene" | Public's vote |
| 4 | Adam Levine | Devon Barley | "Stop and Stare" | Eliminated |
| 5 | CeeLo Green | Nakia | "Sex on Fire" | CeeLo's Choice |
| 6 | Adam Levine | Jeff Jenkins | "Jesus, Take the Wheel" | Eliminated |
| 7 | CeeLo Green | Curtis Grimes | "Addicted to Love" | Eliminated |
| 8 | Adam Levine | Javier Colon | "Angel" | Public's vote |

Non-competition performances
| Order | Performers | Song |
|---|---|---|
| 08.1 | CeeLo Green and his 4 finalists (The Thompson Sisters, Vicci Martinez, Nakia and Curtis Grimes) | "Everyday People" |
| 08.2 | Adam Levine, his four finalists, (Casey Weston, Devon Barley, Jeff Jenkins and Javier Colon), and the John Burroughs High School Choir | "With a Little Help from My Friends" |

=== Week 3: Semifinals (June 21 & 22) ===
Both the artist's respective coach and public vote played a role in determining an artist's advancement into the finale. Artists for respective teams advanced by receiving the highest number of votes.

| Order | Coach | Contestant | Song | Coach points | Public points | Total points | Result |
|---|---|---|---|---|---|---|---|
| 1 | Christina Aguilera | Frenchie Davis | "Like a Prayer" | 50 | 43 | 93 | Eliminated |
| 2 | CeeLo Green | Nakia | "Whataya Want from Me" | 51 | 25 | 76 | Eliminated |
| 3 | Blake Shelton | Dia Frampton | "Losing My Religion" | 50 | 56 | 106 | Advanced to Finals |
| 4 | Adam Levine | Casey Weston | "I Will Always Love You" | 35 | 27 | 62 | Eliminated |
| 5 | Christina Aguilera | Beverly McClellan | "The Thrill Is Gone" | 50 | 57 | 107 | Advanced to Finals |
| 6 | Adam Levine | Javier Colon | "Fix You" | 65 | 73 | 138 | Advanced to Finals |
| 7 | Blake Shelton | Xenia | "The Man Who Can't Be Moved" | 50 | 44 | 94 | Eliminated |
| 8 | CeeLo Green | Vicci Martinez | "Dog Days Are Over" | 49 | 75 | 124 | Advanced to Finals |

Non-competition performances
| Order | Performers | Song |
|---|---|---|
| 1.1 | Maroon 5 and Christina Aguilera | "Moves Like Jagger" |
| 1.2 | Blake Shelton & his team (Dia Frampton & Xenia) | "Honey Bee" |
| 2.1 | The Final 8 | "Faith/Freedom! '90" medley |
| 2.2 | CeeLo Green | "Bright Lights Bigger City" |

=== Week 4: Finale (June 28 & 29) ===
The final 4 performed on Tuesday, June 28, 2011, with the final results following on Wednesday, June 29, 2011. The four finalists each performed an original song and a duet with their coach.

Katharine McPhee made an appearance during the results show to promote her upcoming television series Smash.

Javier Colon was announced as the winner of the inaugural season of The Voice. This also saw coach Adam Levine's first victory on The Voice. Runner-up Dia Frampton's original song, "Inventing Shadows" topped this week's iTunes singles chart.

| Artist | Coach | Order | Original song | Order | Duet with coach | Result |
|---|---|---|---|---|---|---|
| Javier Colon | Adam Levine | 1 | "Stitch by Stitch"^{1} | 6 | "Man in the Mirror" | Winner |
| Dia Frampton | Blake Shelton | 2 | "Inventing Shadows"^{2} | 5 | "I Won't Back Down" | Runner-up |
| Vicci Martinez | CeeLo Green | 3 | "Afraid to Sleep"^{3} | 8 | "Love is a Battlefield" | 3rd/4th place |
| Beverly McClellan | Christina Aguilera | 4 | "Lovesick"^{3} | 7 | "Beautiful" | 3rd/4th place |

Note

1. ^ ^{a} ^{b} ^{c} ^{d} The songs "Stitch by Stitch", "Inventing Shadows", "Afraid to Sleep", and "Lovesick" are all original compositions of Javier Colon, Dia Frampton, Vicci Martinez, and Beverly McClellan respectively.

Non-competition performances (performance show)
| Order | Performers | Song |
|---|---|---|
| 1 | The Voice Coaches | "Under Pressure" |
| 2 | Pitbull and Ne-Yo | "Give Me Everything" |
| 3 | Brad Paisley and Blake Shelton | "Don't Drink the Water" |

Non-competition performances (results show)
| Order | Performers | Song |
|---|---|---|
| 1 | Vicci Martinez and Patrick Monahan | "Drops of Jupiter" |
| 2 | Javier Colon and Stevie Nicks | "Landslide" |
| 3 | Beverly McClellan and Ryan Tedder | "Good Life" |
| 4 | Dia Frampton and Miranda Lambert | "The House That Built Me" |

== Elimination chart ==
Color key
Artist's info

- Team Adam
- Team CeeLo
- Team Christina
- Team Blake

Result details

- Winner
- Runner-up
- Third and Fourth place
- Artist advanced to the finals
- Artist was saved by his/her coach
- Artist was saved by the public
- Artist received the fewest accumulated total points and was eliminated
- Artist was eliminated
- Artist did not perform on that particular week

Live show results per week
| Artist | Week 1 Playoffs | Week 2 | Week 3 | Week 4 Finale |
|---|---|---|---|---|
| Javier Colon | | Safe | Advanced | Winner |
| Dia Frampton | Safe | | Advanced | Runner-up |
| Vicci Martinez | | Safe | Advanced | 3rd/4th place |
| Beverly McClellan | Safe | | Advanced | 3rd/4th place |
| Xenia | Safe | | Eliminated | Eliminated (week 3) |
| Frenchie Davis | Safe | | Eliminated | Eliminated (week 3) |
| Casey Weston | | Safe | Eliminated | Eliminated (week 3) |
| Nakia | | Safe | Eliminated | Eliminated (week 3) |
| Devon Barley | | Eliminated | Eliminated (week 2) | |
| Curtis Grimes | | Eliminated | Eliminated (week 2) | |
| Jeff Jenkins | | Eliminated | Eliminated (week 2) | |
| The Thompson Sisters | | Eliminated | Eliminated (week 2) | |
| Jared Blake | Eliminated | Eliminated (week 1) | | |
| Raquel Castro | Eliminated | Eliminated (week 1) | | |
| Lily Elise | Eliminated | Eliminated (week 1) | | |
| Patrick Thomas | Eliminated | Eliminated (week 1) | | |

== Performances by guests/coaches ==
| Episode | Show segment | Performer(s) | Title | Hot 100 reaction | Hot Digital Songs reaction | Performance type |
|---|---|---|---|---|---|---|
| 9 | Semi-finals | Maroon 5 ft. Christina Aguilera | "Moves Like Jagger" | 8 (debut) | 2 (debut) | Live performance |
| 9 | Semi-finals | Blake Shelton (with Dia Frampton and Xenia) | "Honey Bee" | 15 (+6) | 11(+8) | Live performance |
| 10 | Semi-finals results | CeeLo Green | "Bright Lights Bigger City" | did not chart | did not chart | Live performance |
| 11 | Finals | Pitbull ft. Ne-Yo | "Give Me Everything" | 2 (-1) | 3 (+1) | Live performance |
| 11 | Finals | Brad Paisley ft. Blake Shelton | "Don't Drink the Water" | did not chart | did not chart | Live performance |
| 12 | Finals Results | Patrick Monahan (with Vicci Martinez) | "Drops of Jupiter" | did not chart | did not chart | Live performance (duet) |
| 12 | Finals Results | Stevie Nicks (with Javier Colon) | "Landslide" | did not chart | did not chart | Live performance (duet) |
| 12 | Finals Results | Ryan Tedder (with Beverly McClellan) | "Good Life" | 9 (+9) | 12 (+5) | Live performance (duet) |
| 12 | Finals Results | Miranda Lambert (with Dia Frampton) | "The House That Built Me" | did not chart | did not chart | Live performance (duet) |

== The Voice Live on Tour ==
In the final episode, Daly announced a summer concert tour featuring six stops across the United States: Los Angeles, Las Vegas, Chicago, Boston, Wallingford, and New York.

The tour featured the top two finalists from each team: Javier Colon and Casey Weston (Team Levine), Dia Frampton and Xenia (Team Blake), Vicci Martinez and Nakia (Team CeeLo), & Beverly McClellan and Frenchie Davis (Team Christina).

Out of the six dates, only the New York show sold out of tickets. However, the tour was cancelled in subsequent seasons due to poor ticket sales.

In 2014, the tour resumed from June 21, 2014 to August 2, 2014, including the contestants of the fifth season, the sixth season and the first season contestant Dia Frampton.

== Tour dates ==
| Date | City | Country | Venue |
|---|---|---|---|
| July 27, 2011 | Los Angeles | United States | Gibson Amphitheatre |
| July 30, 2011 | Las Vegas | United States | MGM Grand Garden Arena |
| August 2, 2011 | Chicago | United States | Rosemont Theatre |
| August 4, 2011 | Boston | United States | Bank of America Pavilion |
| August 5, 2011 | Wallingford | United States | Oakdale Theatre |
| August 6, 2011 | New York City | United States | Beacon Theatre |

== Artists' appearances in other media ==
- Frenchie Davis was a semi-finalist on the season two of American Idol but was disqualified.
- Emily Valentine auditioned for the eighth season of American Idol under the name Emily Wynn-Hughes but was cut in the Hollywood Rounds.
- The Thompson Sisters appeared on American Juniors in 2003 as separate acts; both winning the highest prize on the show to join the American Juniors group.
- Vicci Martinez appeared on Star Search in 2003, but did not make it past the semi-finals.
- Kelsey Rey auditioned for American Idol under the name Kelsey Laverack. After her elimination, she returned to the series in season 26, under her new name Felsmere.
- Raquel Castro made her breakthrough 7 years earlier when she starred in the 2004 film Jersey Girl, she would later appear on the second season of Songland.

== Reception ==
=== Ratings ===
The premiere episode, in what was seen as a relative surprise, was the most watched telecast on the night it aired, garnering more viewers than high-profile competitors Dancing with the Stars on ABC (in persons 18 to 49; DWTS had more overall viewers) and Glee on Fox. The series debut garnered 11.775 million viewers from 9 to 11 p.m. It peaked at 10:45 p.m. with 13.398 million viewers (live+SD).

| No. | Episode | Original air date | Viewers (millions) |
|---|---|---|---|
| 1 | The Blind Auditions Premiere, Part 1 | April 26, 2011 | 11.78 |
| 2 | The Blind Auditions, Part 2 | May 3, 2011 | 12.58 |
| 3 | The Battles Premiere, Part 1 | May 10, 2011 | 10.45 |
| 4 | The Battles Premiere, Part 2 | May 17, 2011 | 10.01 |
| 5 | The Battles, Part 3 | May 24, 2011 | 8.48 |
| 6 | The Battles, Part 4 | May 31, 2011 | 14.41 |
| 7 | Live Quarterfinals, Part 1 | June 7, 2011 | 12.31 |
| 8 | Live Quarterfinals, Part 2 | June 14, 2011 | 12.33 |
| 9 | Live Semifinals Performance | June 21, 2011 | 12.05 |
| 10 | Live Semifinals, Results | June 22, 2011 | 10.01 |
| 11 | Live Finale Performance | June 28, 2011 | 12.70 |
| 12 | Live Finale Results | June 29, 2011 | 11.05 |

=== Critical response ===
Rolling Stone's Mallika Rao said of the show's premiere episode, "Could this concept be the best Dutch import since tulips and Eddie Van Halen?" Despite a high viewership in its debut, the show has received mixed reviews on Metacritic, which holds at a 58.
