= Frenchie Davis =

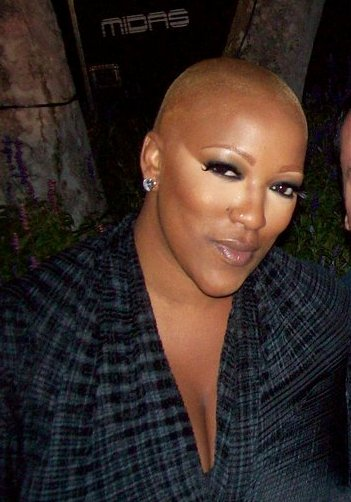
- Frenchie Davis in 2010

Background information
- Born: Franchelle Davis; May 7, 1979 (age 47)
- Origin: Los Angeles, California, United States
- Genres: R&B dance, electronica, pop
- Occupation: Singer actress
- Instrument: Vocals guitar piano
- Years active: 2003–present
- Website: www.officialfrenchie.com

Franchell "Frenchie" Davis (born May 7, 1979) is an American Broadway performer and a soul, dance/electronica, and pop singer. She came to public attention in 2003 as a contestant on the singing competition show American Idol. Davis began performing in Rent on Broadway soon afterward, and was a member of the cast for four years. In 2011, Davis reached the top 8 on the first season of singing competition The Voice.

== Early life and career ==
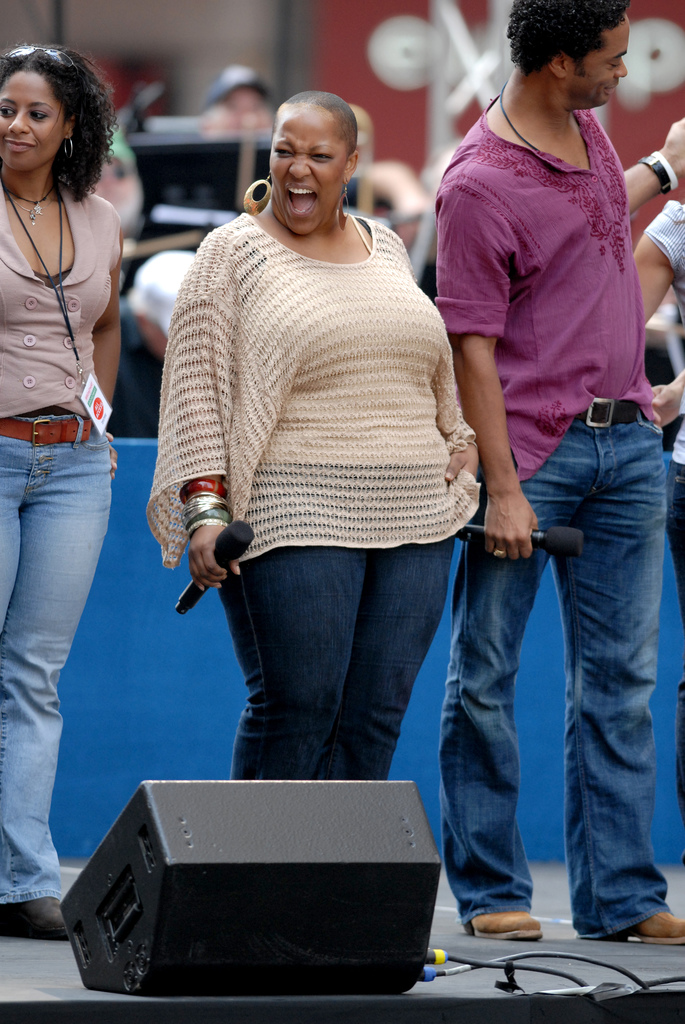
Frenchie Davis performing at Broadway on Broadway in 2006.

Davis was born in Washington, DC, and raised in Los Angeles, CA. She graduated from Howard University in 2014 with a Bachelor of Fine Arts.

In the year 2000, she began her performing career in productions of Little Shop of Horrors and Jesus Christ Superstar with the Freilichtspiele Theatre Company in Schwabisch Hall, Germany.

== American Idol ==
Davis was a contestant on the second season of American Idol in 2003, but was disqualified early in the season due to topless photos taken earlier in her career.

According to Davis, she was up-front about her pictures:

"When I first discovered that I had made it to Hollywood and found out I would be competing to get into the top 30 and then later in the top 12, they had given us all this paperwork to fill out, background checks and that whole thing. So when we were doing that I had a discussion with some members of the production staff and I exposed to them a piece of my past; that when I was 19 years old, I took some pictures and that's not the person I am [anymore]. I wanted to be up-front about it. We talked about it and then nothing happened".

The Idol staff took no action then, but two months later, they decided that Davis's participation would be inappropriate. "They had decided that because American Idol was a family show, that they could not have me on the show because of the pictures I had taken –though they had never seen the pictures," she told EuroWeb. She also added that no one was able to find the pictures in question as the website that featured them had been taken down.

=== Double-standards controversy ===
In 2007, revealing pictures of season six American Idol contender Antonella Barba surfaced on the internet, but Barba was kept on the show (though she was voted off shortly afterward). Many drew parallels to Davis's earlier situation. In an interview conducted for The New York Post on Monday, March 5, 2007, Davis said,

"I couldn't help but notice the difference between the manner in which she was dealt with and how I was dealt with.... I think it's fantastic if Idol has evolved, and I think it's fantastic she won't have to go through what I went through four years ago ... but if the rules have changed, I believe there should be something to make up for the fact that I was humiliated needlessly."

The discrepancy was discussed on talk show The View on March 6, 2007. Co-host Elisabeth Hasselbeck argued the difference was that Davis was paid for her pictures whereas Barba was not. Co-host Rosie O'Donnell disagreed, saying, "I think it's racist. I do... I think it's because she's black". American Idol was also accused of racism by Project Islamic H.O.P.E. activist Najee Ali: "obvious that it's a racial bias... when you have a situation where a black contestant is punished and a similar situation happens to a white contestant and there is no punishment and they're allowed to continue on the show."

== Post-Idol career ==
After American Idol, Davis appeared in the Broadway musical Rent in 2003. She sang the solo in the opening song of Act Two, Seasons of Love, and in ensemble roles such as Mrs. Jefferson (Joanne's mom), a woman with bags, a coat vendor, Mrs. Marquez (Mimi's mom) and others. She also occasionally played the part of Joanne. On June 1, 2005, Davis returned to her previous role in the Broadway production of Rent. Davis had previously announced that she would leave Rent in May 2007, but announced her final performance following a mid-April 2007 show. During the weeks leading up to the April 29 performance of Rent's 10-year reunion, Davis appeared in an iTunes Podcast (Rent: The PodCast). She also joined the original cast for a special encore performance.

In 2004, Davis was cast in the role of Effie in a West Coast-touring production of Dreamgirls, which appeared in Sacramento, San Jose, and Seattle, and later went to the Pittsburgh Civic Light Opera.

From August 3–19, 2007, Davis starred alongside Miche Braden and JMichael in the role of Mahalia Jackson in the Hartford Stage production of Mahalia: A Gospel Musical, written by Tom Stolz and directed by Jeremy B. Cohen.

In 2008, Davis, along with fellow second-season American Idol alumni Ruben Studdard and Trenyce Cobbins, starred in the 30th-anniversary national tour of the musical revue Ain't Misbehavin'. The tour ran until May 2009, and was nominated for a Grammy award in the Best Musical Show Album category.

In the fall of 2010, Frenchie was cast in the role of the Fairy Godmother in Rodgers & Hammerstein's Cinderella (Enchanted Edition) at the Berkeley Playhouse, the resident theatre company at the Julia Morgan Center for the Arts in Berkeley, California.

== The Voice ==
In 2011, Davis competed in the first season of reality competition series The Voice. In the first episode, she performed "I Kissed a Girl" by Katy Perry, advancing to the next round as a member of mentor/judge Christina Aguilera's team of 8.

On the May 10 episode, Frenchie competed in a sing off against Tarralyn Ramsey, both singing "Single Ladies (Put a Ring on It)" by Beyoncé. Frenchie won and made it to the next round.

On the June 7 episode, Frenchie performed "When Love Takes Over" by David Guetta and Kelly Rowland. She was told, "You may very well have the strongest voice in this whole competition."

In the next week, it was announced that Frenchie did not win the fan vote from the previous week's performance, which would have allowed her to move on in the competition. However, Aguilera used her own vote to move Frenchie onto The Voice's Elite 8.

On the June 21 episode, featuring the Showdown of the Elite 8, Davis performed "Like a Prayer" by Madonna.

Frenchie Davis was eliminated during the semi-finals, finishing fifth overall. She did, however, join the other members of the final eight contestants of the show: Javier Colon, Dia Frampton, Vicci Martinez, Beverly McClellan, Casey Weston, Xenia, and Nakia on a U.S. tour summer 2011.

== Post-Voice career ==
In December 2012, Frenchie starred in the musical God Doesn't Mean You Get To Live Forever at the Baruch Performing Arts Center in New York with legendary pastor Dr. James A. Forbes Jr. and Gregory Charles Royal. In 2014 she made her film debut in the comedy film Dumbbells.

In 2017, Davis starred as Henri in The View UpStairs - an off-Broadway musical about the UpStairs Lounge arson attack that killed 50 patrons of a gay bar in New Orleans. She was also a winner of the José Esteban Muñoz Award from CLAGS: the Center for LGBTQ Studies (formerly known as Center for Lesbian and Gay Studies) at The Graduate Center, CUNY. The award is given to an LGBTQ Activist who promotes Queer Studies outside of academia.

== Recording career ==
Frenchie is a featured artist in the Tony Moran single "You Are" that was released December 1, 2009, and peaked at number 5 on the Billboard hot clubplay chart. "You Are" was the debut single from Moran's album Mix Magic Music.

On September 4, 2012, Davis released her debut solo single, "Love's Got A Hold On Me". The song peaked at #12 on the Billboard Dance Chart. The song was billed as the first single from an upcoming solo album, Just Frenchie, but the album was not released.

== Personal life ==
Davis possesses a vocal range of Lyric Mezzo-soprano.

In 2012, Davis came out as bisexual. She continues to be a strong and outspoken advocate for the bisexual community, LGBTQ youth and for LGBTQ people of color.

In 2013, she was the featured performer at the National LGBTQ Task Force's 25th National Conference on LGBT Equality: Creating Change in Atlanta where she explained that she had come out for all of the young LGBT people. "It's so wonderful to see all the young people here. You all are the reason that I chose to be out. Because it is important that you see people in the public eye who are not ashamed of who they are. It is ok to be true to you."

In 2014, Davis created a stir when she spoke out bluntly in response to the verdict in the shooting of Jordan Davis by Michael Dunn where the jury deadlocked on the charge of first-degree murder, saying "As an LGBT woman of color, I am having an extremely difficult time grasping WHY Matthew Shephard's life is so much more valuable than Trayvon's or Jordan's????!?!?! Help me understand, y'all! Help me understand".

== In popular culture ==
Davis was impersonated by guest host Queen Latifah on the March 8, 2003, episode of sketch comedy show Saturday Night Live; Davis was lampooned for her nude photo scandal, brash attitude and melismatic singing style.

== Awards and Recognitions ==
In June 2017, Davis received the José Esteban Muñoz award from CLAGS: The Center for LGBTQ Studies - an award that is given to individuals who promote Queer Studies in their work or activism. She shared the award alongside Nathan Lee Graham and Wilson Cruz.
