= Xenia (singer) =

American singer (born 1994)

- Born: Xenia Edith Martinez; December 17, 1994 (age 31)
- Origin: Temecula, California, United States
- Genres: Pop, soul
- Occupations: Singer, recording artist
- Instruments: vocals, piano, guitar, harmonica
- Years active: 2011–present

Xenia Edith Martinez (born December 17, 1994), known mononymously as Xenia, is an American singer who came in second place on Blake Shelton's team and tied for 5th place overall on the first season of The Voice.

== Life and career ==
=== Early life ===
Born in Chula Vista, California and raised in nearby Temecula, Xenia is the middle child in a family of five. She learned how to play the guitar when she was 6. The instruments she plays are the guitar, harmonica and piano (she learned by ear). She attended Great Oak High School, but was later home-schooled. Prior to her entering The Voice, none of her peers, including her best friend, knew that Xenia could sing.

=== 2011: The Voice ===
Xenia participated in season 1 of The Voice, making it to the Final 8 and placing 2nd on Team Blake. She auditioned with the song, "Breakeven", and was vied for by two judges, Cee Lo Green and Blake Shelton, but eventually chose Blake as her coach. She later emerged victorious over Sara Oromchi in the battle round phase, singing a duet of "I'll Stand By You". Two of the studio versions of her live performances, "Price Tag" and "The Man Who Can't Be Moved", charted on the Billboard Hot 100. "Price Tag" entered the Bubbling Under Hot 100 chart at 116 before climbing to 99 on the Hot 100 charts the subsequent week. She still keeps in touch with her coach, Blake Shelton, as well as past contestants such as Dia Frampton, Nakia and Vicci Martinez.

=== 2011–present: Sing You Home, collaboration with Blake Shelton, and Artemisa ===
Riding on the influence from her participation in The Voice, Xenia gave her first hometown performance at the 17th annual Temecula Valley International Film and Music Festival, singing her cover of "Breakeven" by The Script, which was her debut song on The Voice. Thanks to her former coach Blake Shelton, Xenia was also able to wrap up a performance at Los Angeles' Key Club, late December 2011, with singer-songwriter Jon McLaughlin. They sang a duet of "Maybe It's Over". She has named Jon McLaughlin, Billy Joel and Johnny Cash as her inspirations.

She was signed to Universal Republic Records, and released her debut EP Sing You Home on December 20, 2011. She has described the genre of this EP to be "inspiring soul pop". It peaked at #3 on the iTunes Pop charts, and #10 on the iTunes overall charts.

She has since filmed a music video for her EP's lead single, "Sing You Home". Her robust, raspy voice has also gained the attention of celebrities like Justin Bieber, Jennifer Lopez and Avril Lavigne, who shared her music video on their YouTube channels. "Sing You Home" has now gained over 500,000 views on YouTube.

Xenia was working with a band to complete a full record with plans of having a full-length concert and going on tour in the near future. She has since parted ways with Universal, but went on to release a single, "Hiding Places", on September 25. A music video for "Hiding Places" was filmed and was to be released.

Xenia was featured on Blake Shelton's first Christmas album in 2012, Cheers, It's Christmas, providing guest vocals for the song "Silver Bells".

Xenia released a cover of "America" on September 27 for digital download. Xenia was later slated to perform the National Anthem at the televised 2013 Discover Orange Bowl game, but was replaced just hours before the game by country artist Ayla Brown, daughter of former Massachusetts Senator Scott Brown.

Xenia appears in the 2014 Independent feature film Life Inside Out singing "Hiding Places" as the character Xenia.

In August 2014, Xenia announced via Facebook that she was in the process of finishing her second EP, Artemisa, which is titled after her grandmother. The EP was set to be released in the fall.

== Discography ==
=== Extended plays ===
Title	Album details	Peak chart positions
Title	Album details	US Heat
Sing You Home	Released: December 20, 2011; Label: Universal Republic Records; Formats: Digital download	5
Artemisa	Released: 2014; Label: Independent; Formats: Digital download	—

=== Singles ===
Year	Single	Peak positions	Album
Year	Single	US	Album
2011	"Breakeven"	–	Non-album releases by The Voice
2011	"I'll Stand By You" (credited to Xenia vs Sara Oromchi)	–	Non-album releases by The Voice
2011	"Price Tag"	99	Non-album releases by The Voice
2011	"The Man Who Can't Be Moved"	92	Non-album releases by The Voice

== Videography ==
=== Music videos ===
Year	Title	Director
2012	"Sing You Home"	Elliot Sellers
2015	"Window Pain"	Daniel Carberry
