= Come Through for You =

Come Through For You

Studio album by Javier Colon
- Released: November 21, 2011
- Length: 44:52
- Label: Universal Republic
- Producer: Chris DeStefano; Andrew Frampton; Toby Gad; David Hodges; Da Internz; Rodney "Darkchild" Jerkins; Brent Kutzle; The Messengers; Tommy Sims; Ryan Tedder; Martin Terefe; Wax LTD; Pharrell Williams; Noel Zancanella

Javier Colon chronology
The Truth - Acoustic EP (2010)	Come Through For You (2011)

Singles from Come Through For You
- 1. "As Long As We Got Love" Released: 8 November 2011; 2. "A Drop in the Ocean" Released: 5 May 2012

Come Through For You is the third full-length studio album by singer Javier Colon, and his first after winning NBC's reality talent show The Voice. As of June 2013, it has sold 46,000 copies.

== Critical reception ==
Professional ratings
Review scores
Source	Rating
AllMusic	3/5 stars
Entertainment Weekly	C
Rolling Stone	3/5 stars

AllMusic editor Andy Kellman felt that Colon "makes a smooth transition from R&B-oriented material to mature contemporary rock and ballads that just happen to recall the output of both Levine's Maroon 5 and Bedingfield. Colon certainly sounds more comfortable here than he did on his first two albums, where he was situated somewhere between Anthony Hamilton (rustic throwback soul) and Babyface (silky-smooth R&B ballads)." Rolling Stone's Jody Rosen found the album "thoroughly catchy," but critiqued that: "[T]he music is pro forma radio pop; the lyrics lean towards insipid inspiration. ("Good things come in spades/To those who wait.") But it's hard to be cynical about music this pleasantly well-sung." Entertainment Weekly writer Mikael Wood was critical of the "snoozy soft-rock tunes" that does nothing to elevate Colon, but gave note of one highlight: "a disarmingly specific cancer lament that somehow musicalizes the words "head of oncology."" Jon Pareles, writing for The New York Times, said: "The album stays kindly, polished and simpering all the way through, with only one surprise: The unromantic revelation that ends the song "O.K., Here's the Truth." Mr. Colon's skill as singer and songwriter is obvious, but now that he has national name recognition, blandness reigns."

== Chart performance ==
Come Through for You debuted and peaked at number 134 on the US Billboard 200 and at number 20 on the Top R&B/Hip-Hop Albums chart, with first week sales of 9,974 units, according to Nielsen Soundscan. Despite being the winner of the first season of The Voice, Colon's album was outsold by Red, the album of the first season's runner-up, Dia Frampton. By June 2013, Come Through for You had sold 46,000 copies in the US.

== Track listing ==
Come Through for You track listing
No.	Title	Writer(s)	Producer(s)	Length
1.	"Life Is Getting Better"	Chris DeStefano; Simon Wilcox	DeStefano	3:21
2.	"Runnin"	DeStefano; David Hodges; Jason Derülo	DeStefano; Hodges	3:41
3.	"Raise Your Hand"	Kris Allen; Andrew Frampton; Kevin Hughes	Frampton	4:24
4.	"As Long as We Got Love" (featuring Natasha Bedingfield)	Javier Colon; Hodges; Bedingfield; David Bassett	DeStefano; Hodges	3:16
5.	"Happy Sinner"	Colon; Frampton; James Blunt	Frampton	4:08
6.	"Come Through for You"	Colon; Tommy Sims	Sims	4:16
7.	"1,000 Lights"	Ryan Tedder; Brent Kutzle; Noel Zancanella; Leona Lewis	Tedder; Kutzle; Zancanella	3:19
8.	"Ok, Here's the Truth"	Colon; Sims	Martin Terefe	4:33
9.	"How Many People Can Say That"	Colon; Nasri Atweh; Adam Messinger	The Messengers	3:32
10.	"Stand Up" (featuring Adam Levine)	Colon; Pharrell Williams; Terefe	Williams; Terefe	3:07
11.	"Echo"	Colon; Shelly Peiken; Xandy Barry	Wax LTD	3:52
Total length:				44:52

iTunes bonus tracks
No.	Title	Writer(s)	Producer(s)	Length
12.	"The Most Beautiful Girl in the World"	Colon; Toby Gad	Gad	4:00
13.	"Make It in Love"	Earnest Clark; Marcos Palacios; Aaron Cox; KC Livingston; Angela Irons	Da Internz	3:23

Walmart bonus tracks
No.	Title	Writer(s)	Producer(s)	Length
12.	"A Drop in the Ocean"	Ron Pope; Zach Berkman	Terefe	3:26
13.	"Stitch by Stitch"	Hodges; Lindy Robbins; David Bassett	Rodney "Darkchild" Jerkins	3:16

== Charts ==
Weekly chart performance for Come Through for You
Chart (2011)	Peak position
US Billboard 200	134
US Top R&B/Hip-Hop Albums (Billboard)	20
