= Crazy (Javier song) =

Single by Javier

from the album Javier
- Released: July 15, 2003
- Recorded: 2003
- Genre: R&B
- Label: Capitol
- Songwriters: Javier Colon; C. Sturken; E. Rogers

Javier singles chronology
| "Crazy" (2003) | "Beautiful U R" (2003) |

"Crazy" is the debut single by Javier Colon, credited under the mononym Javier. It was released in 2003 and is from his self-titled album Javier on Capitol Records.

== Charts ==
The single peaked at No. 95 on the Billboard Hot 100 in September 2003 and No. 42 on the Hot R&B/Hip-Hop Songs chart in August 2003.

| Chart (2003) | Peak position |
|---|---|
| US Billboard Hot 100 | 95 |
| US Hot R&B/Hip-Hop Songs | 42 |
