= Javier (album) =

Studio album by Javier Colon
- Released: August 5, 2003
- Length: 54:46
- Label: Capitol
- Producer: Kevin Cloud; Andrew Slater; Carl Sturken and Evan Rogers; The Underdogs

Javier Colon chronology
Javier (2003)	Left of Center (2006)

Javier is the debut album by American singer Javier Colon. It was released on August 5, 2003 by Capitol Records. The album reached number 91 on the US Billboard 200.

== Critical reception ==
Professional ratings
Review scores
Source	Rating
AllMusic	3/5 stars
Blender	3/5 stars

AllMusic editor Jonathan Widran rated the album three out of five stars. He found that "all of the intensely commercial beats, choruses, and productions will earn Javier much deserved attention, and he will also no doubt attract some legitimate standing as a potential jazz artist with the closer, "October Sky," a silky late-night jazz ballad featuring jazz icons Roy Hargrove and Mulgrew Miller."

== Track listing ==
Javier track listing
No.	Title	Writer(s)	Producer(s)	Length
1.	"Crazy"	Javier Colon; Carl Sturken; Evan Rogers	Andrew Slater; Sturken; Rogers	4:53
2.	"Beautiful U R"	Colon; Damon Homas; Harvey Mason, Jr.	The Underdogs	3:46
3.	"Song for Your Tears"	Colon; Sturken; Rogers	Sturken; Rogers	4:37
4.	"Slow Motion"	Colon; Billy Mann; Thomas; Eric Dawkins; Anson Dawkins; Mason; Nathan East	The Underdogs	3:58
5.	"Hey Little Sister"	Colon; Sturken; Rogers	Sturken; Rogers	5:08
6.	"Biggest Mistake"	Colon; Mason; Thomas; Antonio Dixon	The Underdogs	4:05
7.	"Interlude #1"			0:28
8.	"If I Never Get to Heaven"	Colon; Rogers; Sturken; Roni Skies	Sturken; Rogers	5:00
9.	"Can't Have My Heart"	Colon; Kevin Cloud; Sturken	Cloud	4:12
10.	"She Spoke to Me"	Colon; Rogers; Sturken	Sturken; Rogers	4:42
11.	"In Your Hands"	Colon; Cloud; Skies	Sturken; Rogers	4:10
12.	"She'll Never Know"	Colon; Cloud; Skies	Cloud	5:24
13.	"Interlude #2"			0:19
14.	"October Sky"	Colon; Rogers; Sturken	Sturken; Rogers	7:06
Total length:				54:46

== Personnel ==
- Javier Colon – vocals, piano, guitars, percussion
- Tony Dixon – keyboards
- Omar Edwards – organ
- Eric D. Jackson, Michael Landau, Dean Parks, Michael Thompson – guitars
- Carl Sturken – guitars, keyboards
- Larry Campbell – pedal steel
- Nathan East, Mike Elizondo – bass
- ?uestlove – drums, percussion
- Karriem Riggins – programming
- Charles Crawford – scratching
- Strings arranged and conducted by Larry Gold
  - Charlie Bisharat, Darius Campo, Mario Diaz de Leon, Bruce Dukov, Olga Konopelsky, Emma Kummrow, Charlene Kwas, Sid Page, Charles Parker, Haim Shtrum, Gregory Teperman – violin
  - Davis A. Barnett, David Yang – viola
  - Dorothy Lawson – cello

== Chart ==
Weekly chart performance for Javier
Chart (2003)	Peak position
US Billboard 200	91
US Top R&B/Hip-Hop Albums (Billboard)	18
