= Left of Center (album) =

Studio album by Javier Colon
- Released: March 7, 2006
- Length: 52:25
- Label: Capitol
- Producers: Michael Angelo; The Beat Detectives; Ray "Sōl Survivor" Cham; Carvin "Ransum" Haggins; Rudy "Mayru" Maya; Mischke; Cory "Co-P!" Peterson; Evan Rogers; Frank Romano; Johnnie Smith; Carl Sturken

Javier Colon chronology
Javier (2003)	Left of Center (2006)	The Truth – Acoustic EP (2010)

Left of Center is the second studio album by American singer Javier Colon. It was released by Columbia Records on March 7, 2006 in the United States.

== Critical reception ==
Professional ratings
Review scores
Source	Rating
About.com	3.5/5 stars
Vibe	3/5 stars

Cleveland Scene editor Dan LeRoy found that "with a range as wide as his smile, [Javier] hits the slow jams like a young, hungry 'Face, but handles the acoustic numbers more like Sweet Baby James, pausing in between for a few slices of atmospheric club candy and "The Answer Is Yes," a gospel tribute that wisely doesn't oversell itself and thus succeeds spectacularly. Nothing stretches Javier as far as "October Sky," the straight-no-chaser jazz closer from his debut, but Left of Center hits every target it aims for dead-on." Jozen Cummings from Vibe described the album as "musically eclectic, to say the least. And at times, his accomplished but chameleon-like musicianship disturbs the overall direction [...] But when Javier settles down and concentrates on traditional R&B, the album thrives. As both a guitarist and a singer, his ambidextrous artistry comes alive [...] These moments dominate Left of Center and help Javier bring it back home."

== Track listing ==
Left of Center track listing
No.	Title	Writer(s)	Producer(s)	Length
1.	"You're the One"	Javier Colon; Art Neville; Carvin Haggins; George Porter Jr.; Ziggy Modeliste; Taalib Johnson	Carvin & Ivan	4:06
2.	"Indecent Proposal"	Gromyko Collins; Michael Norfleet; Ollie Collins III; Ray "Sōl Survivor" Cham; Robert Bacon	Cham; Collins^{[a]}; Javier^{[a]}	4:05
3.	"Wassup"	Michael Angelo Saulsberry; Mischke Butler	Michael Angelo; Mischke	3:49
4.	"Dance for Me"	Colon; Curtis Wilson III; Rochad Holiday; Shaffer Smith; Solomon Ridge	The Beat Detectives; Sauce^{[a]}; Javier^{[a]}	3:36
5.	"The Answer Is Yes"	Colon; Carl Sturken; Evan Rogers	Sturken; Rogers	3:22
6.	"Is This Love"	Haggins; Ivan Barias; Johnnie Smith	Carvin & Ivan	3:36
7.	"Poetry Javier"	Haggins; Barias; Johnson; Frank Romano	Carvin & Ivan	3:58
8.	"Count On Me" (featuring Anthony Hamilton)	Colon; Hamilton; Wilson; Holiday; David Scott	The Beat Detectives; Hamilton^{[a]}; Sauce^{[a]}; Javier^{[a]}	4:11
9.	"Once We Start"	Colon; Haggins; Andre Dandridge; Romano; J. Smith	Romano; J. Smith	4:22
10.	"Can I Talk to You"	Colon; Kevin Cloud; Rudy "Mayru" Maya	Maya; Javier^{[a]}	3:57
11.	"Ways I'm Feeling U"	Colon; Sturken; Rogers	Sturken; Rogers	4:10
12.	"Lovin' U"	Colon; Cory "Co-P!" Peterson	Peterson	5:24
13.	"Dance for Me" (Reggaeton Remix) (featuring Luna)	Colon; Wilson; Holiday; S. Smith; Ridge	The Beat Detectives; Sauce^{[a]}; Javier^{[a]}; Maya^{[b]}	3:34
Total length:				52:25

Notes

- ^{^[a]} denotes a vocal producer
- ^{^[b]} denotes a remix producer

== Chart ==
Weekly chart performance for Left of Center
Chart (2006)	Peak position
US Top R&B/Hip-Hop Albums (Billboard)	37
