= Emily Tarver =

Comedian

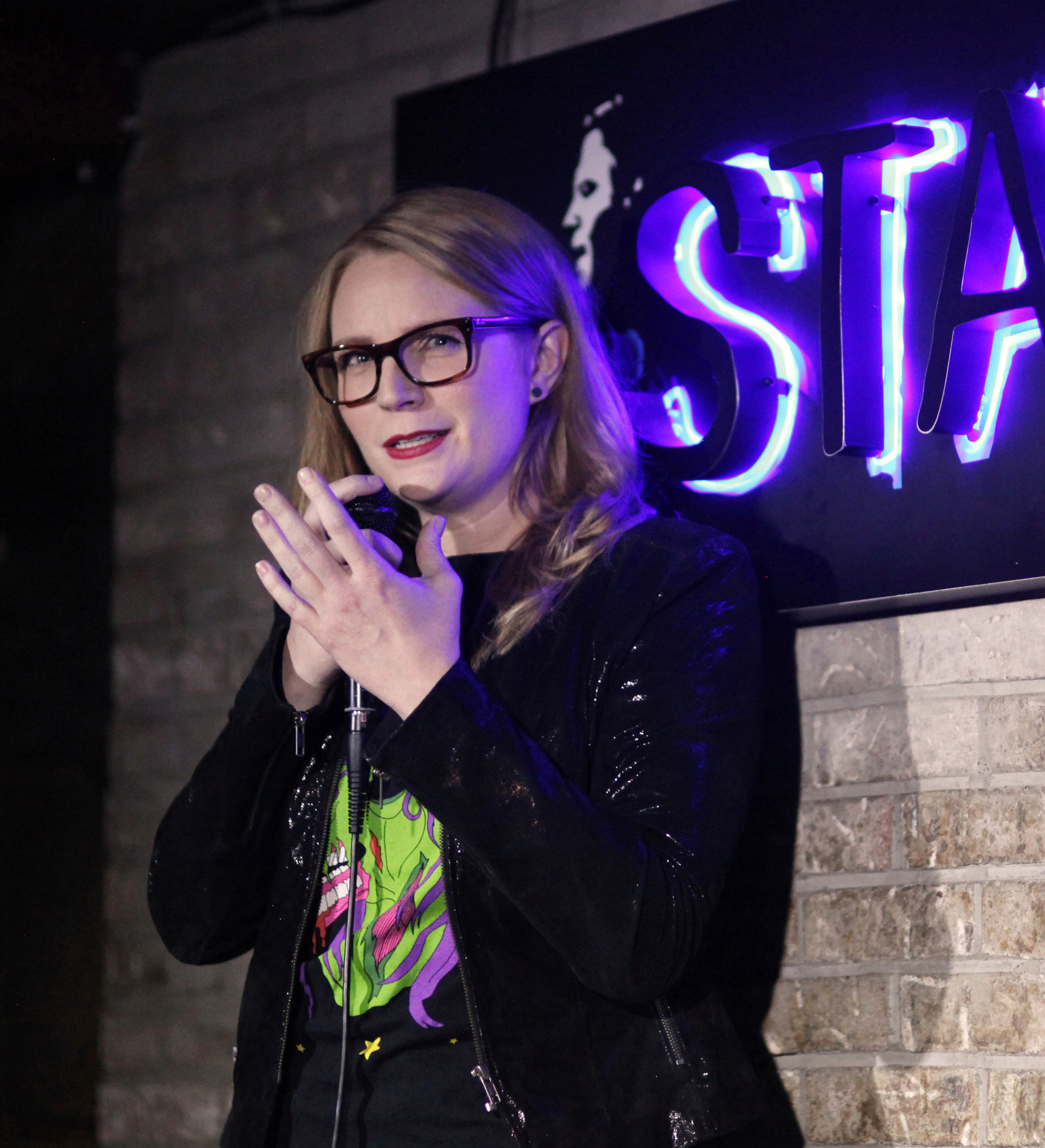
- Tarver at The Stand in May 2016
- Occupations: Actress; Comedian; Musician
- Partner: Vicci Martinez (2018-present)
- Website: emilytarver.com

Emily Tarver is an actress, comedian and musician from Houston, Texas.

Tarver has performed as a cast member of VH1's series Best Week Ever and has performed stand-up and improvisational comedy in a variety of venues, including the Upright Citizens Brigade Theatre, The Stand and The Comedy Cellar. Emily portrayed CO McCullough in Seasons 4-7 of Netflix's Orange is the New Black and starred in Donny! on the USA Network. She has starred as "Emily" in a series of American television commercials for the furniture company Havertys, and has appeared in national commercials for Lowe's, Comcast, Publix, AT&T, and Yoplait, among others. One Yoplait commercial starring Tarver was pulled from broadcast following complaints by the National Eating Disorders Association. Tarver responded "So they pulled my yogurt ad because it 'promotes eating disorders'. Ironically, now I will not be able to afford to eat."

== Personal life ==
Tarver has been in a relationship with her Orange Is the New Black co-star Vicci Martinez since July 2018.

== Filmography ==
Year(s)	Title	Role(s)
2011	The Big C	Ms. Conant
2012	Damaged Goods (Short)	Tits McGee
2012	Going Local (Short)	Christine
2013–2014	Best Week Ever	Herself
2014	"That's So House Hunters"	Herself
2014	The Actress	Drunk Friend
2014–2015	The Residuals	Amy Parker
2015	Black-ish	Lindsey
2015	Sisters	Brayla
2015	Donny!	Pam
2016–2019	Orange Is the New Black	CO Artesian McCullough
