= Lily Elise =

American singer

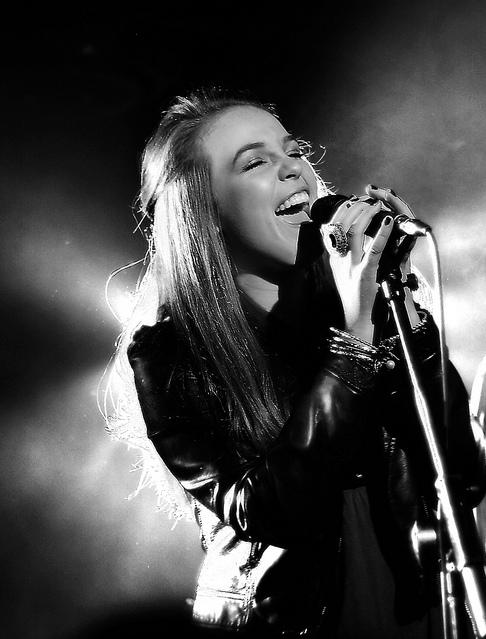

Background information
- Born: Lily Elise Housh; February 20, 1991 (age 35); Berkeley, California, United States
- Genres: Alternative rock; pop; R&B
- Occupations: Singer, songwriter
- Instrument: Vocals
- Website: lilyelise.com

Lily Elise (born February 20, 1991) is a singer-songwriter from Berkeley, California. Elise has worked with artists such as Chappell Roan, Gwen Stefani, Conan Gray, Olivia Rodrigo, Joe Walsh, Don Henley, James Taylor, Miley Cyrus, Lainey Wilson, Dillon Francis, Twin Shadow, Felix Cartal, Audra Mae, Hungarian pop star Gigi Radics, Markus Feehily, and Hayden Panettiere.

== Early career ==
Lily Elise is an alumna of the San Rafael, California-based a cappella group, Til Dawn.

Elise was a member of Team Christina on the first season of the America television vocal talent show, The Voice. She performed several songs, including Lady Marmalade with Team Christina, before leaving the show.

In 2012, Elise co-wrote "Vadonatúj érzés" ("Daydream") for Hungarian singer Gigi Radics, winner of season six of the music show Megasztár. The song, released on November 26, 2012, reached number one on the Mahasz Rádiós Top 40 radio airplay chart, remaining at number 1 for ten weeks.

Elise co-wrote and was featured on Canadian electronic music producer and DJ Felix Cartal’s single "Let It Go," released on April 29, 2014, as part of his Credits EP. The single was released via Steve Aoki’s imprint, Dim Mak Records. On October 27, 2014, she appeared on "Hurricane," a track from moobahton producer and DJ Dillon Francis' album Money Sucks, Friends Rule.

On November 4, 2014, Elise released the lead single "Generator," from her debut EP Taken. The music blog, All Things Go, praised the single as a "stunning combination of pop and R&B that few can pull off". Following "Generator," she released the second single "Suitcases," from her Taken EP. In March 2015, Elise collaborated with Twin Shadow on "Alone", a track from his album Eclipse. In 2015, she released the third single and title track, "Taken," from her debut EP of the same name. The single premiered on Billboard.com, where it was described as "edgy pop, R&B, or even EDM".

Elise co-wrote the debut single "What If It's You" for fictional character Juliette Barnes (played by Hayden Panettiere), alongside co-writer Audra Mae and producer Scott Effman. The song aired during Season 4 of the ABC musical drama Nashville, appearing in episodes 2 ("’Til the Pain Outwears the Shame") and 7 ("Can’t Get Used to Losing You"). The song was later included on "The Music of Nashville: Season 4, Volume 1". She also co-wrote "Find My Way" with producer Lester Mendez and former Westlife member Markus Feehily for the deluxe edition of his debut solo album, Fire.

== Current career ==
Elise frequently performs background vocals in studio and live performance with artists including Olivia Rodrigo, Chappell Roan, Don Henley, Joe Walsh, Gwen Stefani, and Miley Cyrus. She is on the Olivia Rodrigo Unraveled tour as one of the three background vocalists and is credited as Lily Housh on the season 52 episode of Austin City Limits with Olivia Rodrigo.

Her music as Lils includes original works from her EP Oliver and Lils

In 2021, Elise performed background vocals in Olivia Rodrigo's Vevo Lift performance for "Favorite Crime".

In 2024, Elise provided background vocals for Chappell Roan's single "Good Luck, Babe" and sang backing vocals for Gwen Stefani's televised performance of "Bouquet" on The Tonight Show Starring Jimmy Fallon. On October 25, 2024, JC Chasez released Playing with Fire, a musical concept album produced alongside Jimmy Harry based on Mary Shelley's novel Frankenstein with Elise as Elizabeth.

"Sweeter (When You're Dancing)," performed by Elise, was released on December 20, 2024. The song is featured on the soundtrack for the Pixar mini-series Dream Productions, streaming on Disney+.

Episode 6 of Win or Lose (miniseries) (Mixed Messages) won 2025 Annie Award for Music TV/Media The song "Paradise featuring Lils" is featured in that episode.

She contributes background vocals to Chappell Roan's singles "The Giver" and "The Subway".

Elise performs background vocals with Olivia Rodrigo in 2026 on Saturday Night Live and Jimmy Kimmel.

She can also be heard on a number of advertising commercials played on network and streaming TV like "Kaleidoscope Bliss," which is featured in a commercial for the Lincoln Navigator.

Her band Mantragold formerly known as Blesd, releases original music available on Spotify.

== Touring and live performance ==
Elise has performed as a touring backing vocalist for several major recording artists, appearing in live concerts and tours across North America and Europe.

She performs in the trio of background vocalists on Olivia Rodrigo's 2026 Unraveled Tour.

=== Don Henley Cass County Tour ===
She has toured with Don Henley, performing as part of his live backing vocal ensemble on multiple tours, including performances at major venues such as the Minnesota State Fair and Hyde Park concerts. She was part of a group of featured backing singers providing vocal harmonies during Henley’s solo performances and Eagles material.

Elise has also performed live as a backing vocalist with Joe Walsh during Eagles-related touring configurations, contributing background harmonies during live performances of classic Eagles material.

In addition, she has appeared as a backing vocalist for Gwen Stefani, contributing live background vocals during televised and performances supporting Stefani’s solo material.

=== VetsAid ===
Elise performed as a backing vocalist as part of the house band for Joe Walsh’s VetsAid concerts beginning with the 2018 benefit concert in Tacoma, Washington, which featured performances by Joe Walsh, Don Henley, James Taylor, Chris Stapleton, and Haim.

She provided live backing vocals alongside the event’s touring ensemble during performances supporting James Taylor and other headlining artists.

== Discography ==
=== Extended play ===
Taken (2015)

==== Singles ====
"Generator" (2014) "Suitcases" (2014) "Taken" (2015)

=== Featured artist ===
"Let It Go" – Felix Cartal featuring Lily Elise (2014)

"Hurricane" – Dillon Francis featuring Lily Elise (2014)

=== Songwriting credits ===
"Vadonatúj érzés" – Gigi Radics (2012)

"What If It's You" – Nashville soundtrack (2015)

"Find My Way" – Markus Feehily (2015)

=== Soundtrack appearances ===
"Sweeter (When You're Dancing)" – Dream Productions (Original Soundtrack) (2024)

"Paradise" (as Lils) – Win or Lose (episode 6: "Mixed Signals") (2025)

=== Background vocals ===
Olivia Rodrigo – You Seem Pretty Sad for a Girl So in Love (2026)Corcoran, Nina (June 12, 2026). "Read the Full Credits to Olivia Rodrigo's You Seem Pretty Sad for a Girl So in Love". Pitchfork. – "Honeybee", "Maggots for Brains"

Chappell Roan – "Good Luck, Babe!" (2024)

Chappell Roan – "The Giver" (2025)

Chappell Roan – "The Subway" (2025)

Gwen Stefani – "Bouquet" (live performance, 2024)

Olivia Rodrigo – "Favorite Crime" (Vevo LIFT performance, 2021)

Conan Gray – Wishbone (2025)"Wishbone credits". MusicBrainz.

=== Collaborations with Autograf ===
"You Might Be" – Autograf featuring Lils (2017)"You Might Be (ft. Lils)". MusicBrainz.

"Dead Soon" – Autograf featuring Lils and Bonsai Mammal (2018)"Dead Soon (feat. Lils & Bonsai Mammal)". Shazam.

=== Other appearances ===
Playing with Fire (concept album) – JC Chasez (2024)
