= Tarralyn Ramsey =

- Born: Tarralyn LaJuan Ramsey; July 8, 1979 (age 46); Melbourne, Florida
- Origin: Jacksonville, Florida
- Genres: CCM, Christian R&B, gospel, urban contemporary gospel, contemporary R&B
- Occupation(s): Singer, songwriter
- Instrument(s): vocals, singer-songwriter
- Years active: 2000–present
- Labels: Verity, Casablanca, Taraprincel
- Website: tarralynramsey.com

Tarralyn LaJuan Ramsey (born July 8, 1979) is an American gospel musician, songwriter and artist. She began her music career in 2000, with the release of the religious Tarralyn Ramsey album on Verity Records. This would be her Billboard magazine breakthrough release on the Gospel Albums chart. Following her win on the VH1 reality series Born to Diva in 2003, she signed with Casablanca Records and released her second album, Tarralyn, which featured the single "Up Against All Odds".

== Early life ==
Ramsey was born on July 8, 1979, as Tarralyn LaJuan Ramsey, in Melbourne, Florida, and was reared in the church by her parents, a bishop and a school teacher. She has a younger sister.

== Music career ==
=== Early Gospel beginnings ===
Her music career started in 2000, with the release of Tarralyn Ramsey by Verity Records on June 20, 2000. This album would be her breakthrough release on the Billboard magazine chart, which it placed at #12 on the Gospel Albums chart. The album would feature the Gospel hits "Tell It" and "Unconditional Love" and earn Ramsey a Stellar Award nomination for Best New Artist.

=== Born to Diva and Casablanca Records ===
After being with Verity for several years, Ramsey moved on in her career and in 2003 entered the VH1 Born to Diva competition reality show. She was announced the winner of the competition by Sharon Osbourne live onstage and on television at VH1 Divas Duets, and performed at the concert alongside headliners that included Whitney Houston, Beyoncé and Chaka Khan. Following the win, she signed with Casablanca/Universal Records under former Sony Music executive Tommy Mottola. Her sophomore album Tarralyn was released on June 8, 2004 and peaked at #59 on the Billboard R&B Albums chart. It was led by the single "Up Against All Odds" and her second single, "Baby U Know" featuring rapper Murphy Lee.

The win led her to be featured on Entertainment Tonight as well as in magazines such as Vibe, Ebony, Jet, People, Seventeen and others. She promoted the album by opening for Mary J. Blige on her No More Drama Tour and as well as joining the Seventeen Magazine/Pantene's "Total You" Tour, "The BET College Tour" and performing at venues such as Carnegie Hall and Rocket Nation.

=== The Voice, The X Factor and Going Independent ===
In 2009, by invitation, Ramsey was the first contestant on The Voice, and performed Faith Hill's "Breathe". She was chosen to be on Christina Aguilera's team. She made it to the Battle Rounds, performing "Single Ladies (Put a Ring on It)" with Frenchie Davis. After her elimination from the competition, she released her third studio album, Beyond the Darkness, a gospel album on her own independent label Taraprincel Records in 2009. The album was reviewed by Cross Rhythms magazine, where it received a seven out of ten rating.

In 2012, Ramsey auditioned for The X Factor USA and earned four "Yes" votes from judges Simon Cowell, Demi Lovato, L.A. Reid and Britney Spears, but did not move on to the Bootcamp stage.

She later formed her own label, Nylarrat Ent. Group, and released a holiday EP titled 'Tis the Season for Miracles on December 10, 2014. Her new single "Love" was released that year as well. Another stand-alone single, "Hope", was released in 2016. Since then, she has followed up with two more studio albums, the holiday-themed releases O Holy Night (2017) and Winter Wonderland (2020).

Her latest single, "Jesus We Need You", premiered in April 2021.

== Discography ==
=== Studio albums ===
List of studio albums, with selected chart positions
Title	Album details		
Title	Album details	US Gos	US R&B
Tarralyn Ramsey	Released: June 30, 2000; Label: Verity; CD, digital download	12	–
Tarralyn	Released: June 8, 2004; Label: Casablanca; CD, digital download	–	59
Beyond the Darkness	Released: September 1, 2009; Label: Taraprincel; CD, digital download	–	–
'Tis the Season for Miracles - EP	Released: December 10, 2014; Label: Nylarrat/Heartstrings; CD, digital download	–	–
O Holy Night	Released: December 17, 2017; Label: Nylarrat/Heartstrings; CD, digital download	–	–
Winter Wonderland	Released: December 23, 2020; Label: Nylarrat Ent. Group; digital download	–	–

=== Singles ===
- "Tell It" (2000)
- "Unconditional Love" (2000)
- "Up Against All Odds" (2003)
- "Baby U Know" (with Murphy Lee) (2014)
- "Single Ladies (Put a Ring on It)" (with Frenchie Davis) (2011)
- "Breathe" (2011)
- "The Christmas Song (Chestnuts)" (2013)
- "Love" (2014)
- "Hope" (2016)
- "Jesus We Need You" (2021)
