= Donny! =

- Genre: Sitcom
- Created by: Donny Deutsch; Angie Day
- Starring: Donny Deutsch; Emily Tarver; Meera Rohit Kumbhani; Jessica Renee Russell; Hailey Giles; Fiona Robert; Jacob Thomas Anderson
- Country of origin: United States
- Original language: English
- No. of seasons: 1
- No. of episodes: 6

Production
- Executive producers: Angie Day; Donny Deutsch; Ken Druckerman; Jan David Frouman; Henrik Pabst; Banks Tarver
- Producers: Christopher Savage; Kevin Vargas
- Cinematography: Robert Barocci
- Camera setup: Single-camera
- Running time: 22 minutes
- Production company: Left/Right

Original release
- Network: USA Network
- Release: November 10 – December 15, 2015

Donny! is an American sitcom created by Donny Deutsch and Angie Day. The series aired on USA Network from November 10 to December 15, 2015.

On August 3, 2016, USA announced that the series was cancelled after one season.

== Cast ==
=== Main ===
- Donny Deutsch as Donny Deutsch
- Emily Tarver as Pam
- Meera Rohit Kumbhani as Zoe
- Jessica Renee Russell as Violet
- Hailey Giles as Jackie
- Fiona Robert as Coco Deutsch
- Jacob Thomas Anderson as Jagger Deutsch

=== Guest ===
- Tina Casciani as Galina
- Katie Morrison as Becky
- Shannon O'Neill as Stage Manager
- Amin Joseph as Trainer
- Christie Brinkley as Herself
- Sean Patrick Doyle as Coach Gordon
- Lesli Margherita as Piper (ex-wife)

== Episodes ==
No.	Title	Directed by	Written by	Original release date	Prod. code	US viewers (millions)
1	"A Sext Ruined My Life!"	Michael LaHaie	Angie Day & Donny Deutsch	November 10, 2015	101	0.696
2	"Foxy at Fifty!"	Michael LaHaie	Angie Day & Donny Deutsch	November 17, 2015	102	0.558
3	"Little League Dads Gone Wild!"	Michael LaHaie	Angie Day & Donny Deutsch	November 24, 2015	103	0.467
4	"I'm Middle Aged, Married and ... Coming Out!"	Michael LaHaie	Angie Day & Donny Deutsch	December 1, 2015	104	0.528
5	"Sexual Secrets of Married Men: Exposed!"	Michael LaHaie	Sarah Afkami & Donny Deutsch	December 8, 2015	105	0.578
6	"Boom Boom Abs!"	Michael LaHaie	Angie Day & Donny Deutsch	December 15, 2015	106	0.310

== Reception ==
On Rotten Tomatoes, Donny! has an aggregate score of 23% based on 3 positive and 10 negative critic reviews. The website's consensus reads: "Often unfunny and occasionally creepy, Donny! draws unfavorable comparisons to any number of superior improvisational comedies."
