= Javier Colon =

American singer-songwriter (born 1978)

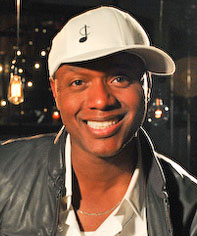
- Colon in 2011

Background information
- Born: Javier Colón; April 29, 1978 (age 48); Stratford, Connecticut, U.S.
- Genres: R&B; alternative rock; funk; soul; neo soul; folk; acoustic
- Occupation: Singer–songwriter
- Instruments: Vocals; guitar; piano
- Years active: 1999–present
- Labels: Concord; Universal Republic; Capitol
- Website: www.javiercolon.com

Javier Colon (stylized as Colón; born April 29, 1978) is an American singer-songwriter. He has referred to his style of music as being "acoustic soul". He was a member of EmcQ and The Derek Trucks Band, and worked with many musicians before going solo. From 2002 to 2006, he was signed to Capitol Records, known as artist Javier. In 2006, however, the contract was terminated and Javier Colon became an independent artist with his own label, Javier Colon Music. In 2011, he was the winner of season 1 of the American talent competition show on NBC, The Voice, receiving $100,000 and signing a recording contract with Universal Republic Records. Colon eventually decided to part ways with Universal Republic in 2012.

== Early life ==
Colon was born in Stratford, Connecticut, the son of a Dominican father and Puerto Rican mother. His father worked in a radio station. He went to Frank Scott Bunnell High School in Stratford, Connecticut, where he started writing songs. Then he pursued a degree in music education from the University of Hartford's Hartt School. While studying, Javier also performed as vocalist and percussionist in EmcQ, a soul/funk band led by lead guitarist Ian McHugh and mainly dedicated to the legacy of Stevie Wonder.

== Music career ==
When EmcQ opened a show for the soul-jazz trio Soulive, the group's guitarist, Eric Krasno, was impressed by Javier's vocals and recommended him to his friend Derek Trucks, who he knew was looking for a lead vocalist for The Derek Trucks Band. Following his college graduation and a successful audition in July 2000, Javier joined the band in August 2000.

After touring with the band for nearly two years, Javier, then 24 years old, left the band in April 2002 to pursue a solo career, having been signed by Capitol Records. He went on to release two albums with Capitol Records, the first the self-titled Javier in 2003, and the second entitled Left of Center in 2006.

Since parting ways with Capitol Records, Javier has performed with such diverse acts as Joss Stone, Darius Rucker, the Indigo Girls, Stevie Nicks, Adam Levine, and Anthony Hamilton, and recorded an EP on his own label, Javier Colon Music. On stage, Javier's primary instruments are steel and nylon stringed acoustic guitars by Larrivée (guitar company) and Taylor Guitars. In 2009, he was featured as singer and songwriter for song, "October Sky", on Vanessa Williams's vocal album, The Real Thing.

== Recordings ==
Javier (2003)

On August 5, 2003 – Javier released his debut, self-titled album on Capitol Records. His first single, entitled "Crazy", debuted at No. 95 on the Billboard Hot 100 and reached No. 42 on the Hot R&B/Hip-Hop Songs chart. The second single, "Beautiful U R", did not have the same commercial success as his first release. The album reached No. 91 on the Billboard 200 albums chart and No. 18 on the R&B/Hip-Hop Albums chart. Javier consisted of mainly R&B songs, with a mixture of other genres such as jazz and funk, as well as a little influence of Javier's Latin roots. After the release, Javier's music style drew comparisons with the likes of Kenny Lattimore, Brian McKnight, and Babyface. Pianist Mulgrew Miller and trumpeter Roy Hargrove performed on the final track, "October Sky", the only featured artists to appear on the album.

Left of Center (2006)

On March 7, 2006 – Three years after his self-titled debut, Javier released his second album Left of Center. The album title was used to demonstrate that Javier was not like the rest of the present Contemporary R&B artists. Javier did keep to his main R&B/Neo-soul genre, but again mixed in other styles and genres. Three singles from album were released: "Indecent Proposal", "Dance for Me", and "The Answer is Yes". None of them had any major success, and the album only reached #37 on Billboard's R&B/Hip-Hop Albums chart. Like Javier, Left of Center had minimal artist features, namely just fellow R&B artist Anthony Hamilton who appeared on the song "Count On Me". Although the album was not successful commercially, multiple reviews praised Javier for his unique style and willingness to do his own thing.

The Truth-Acoustic – EP (2010)

On August 3, 2010 – This six-song EP entitled "The Truth" was released on Javier's own label. In the Album Notes for the EP at CD Baby, Javier is quoted as saying, "The Truth-Acoustic EP is part 1 of a larger project that I've been working on for over 3 years. I've taken a few songs that will be on my upcoming album Ok... Here's The Truth and recorded them acoustically for this EP."

=== The Voice (2011) ===
Starting April 26, 2011, Javier Colon appeared as a contestant on NBC's reality talent show The Voice. The show, produced by John de Mol and Mark Burnett, features a group of contestants competing for a $100,000 grand prize and a Universal Republic recording contract.

On the first show, Javier sang the Cyndi Lauper classic "Time After Time". All four judges, Adam Levine, Cee-Lo Green, Blake Shelton and Christina Aguilera, opted to take him as one of their finalists, with both Levine and Shelton giving him a standing ovation. He was the only contestant in blind auditions stage besides Jeff Jenkins to win all four judges.

On May 17, 2011, in the Battle Round (the Final 32), Levine put Javier against Angela Wolff choosing that they both sing "Stand By Me", originally by Ben E. King. Consequently, Levine picked him to continue in the show in the live shows, as part of the Final 16.

On June 22, 2011, Javier advanced in the competition by accumulating the highest score on Team Adam. The highest score was determined by coach Levine's score in combination with all America's votes. He beat out fellow team member Casey Weston to move on in the music competition.

On June 29, 2011, at the end of the show, the voting results were announced. With more votes than any other contestant, Javier Colon won the first season of NBC's "The Voice", receiving $100,000 in cash and a Universal Republic recording contract.

=== Performances on The Voice ===
| Stage | Song | Original Artist | Date | Order | Result |
|---|---|---|---|---|---|
| Blind Audition | "Time After Time" | Cyndi Lauper | April 26, 2011 | 1.15 | All four chairs turned Joined Team Adam |
| Battles (Top 32) | "Stand By Me" (vs. Angela Wolff) | Ben E. King | May 17, 2011 | 4.3 | Saved by Adam |
| Quarter-finals | "Angel" | Sarah McLachlan | June 14, 2011 | 8.8 | Saved by Public Vote |
| Semi-finals | "Fix You" | Coldplay | June 21, 2011 | 9.6 | Saved by Coach and Public Vote (138 Points) |
| Live Finale (Final 4) | "Stitch by Stitch" (Original) | Javier Colon | June 28, 2011 | 11.1 | Winner |
| Live Finale (Final 4) | "Man in the Mirror" (with Adam Levine) | Michael Jackson | June 28, 2011 | 11.6 | Winner |

== After The Voice ==
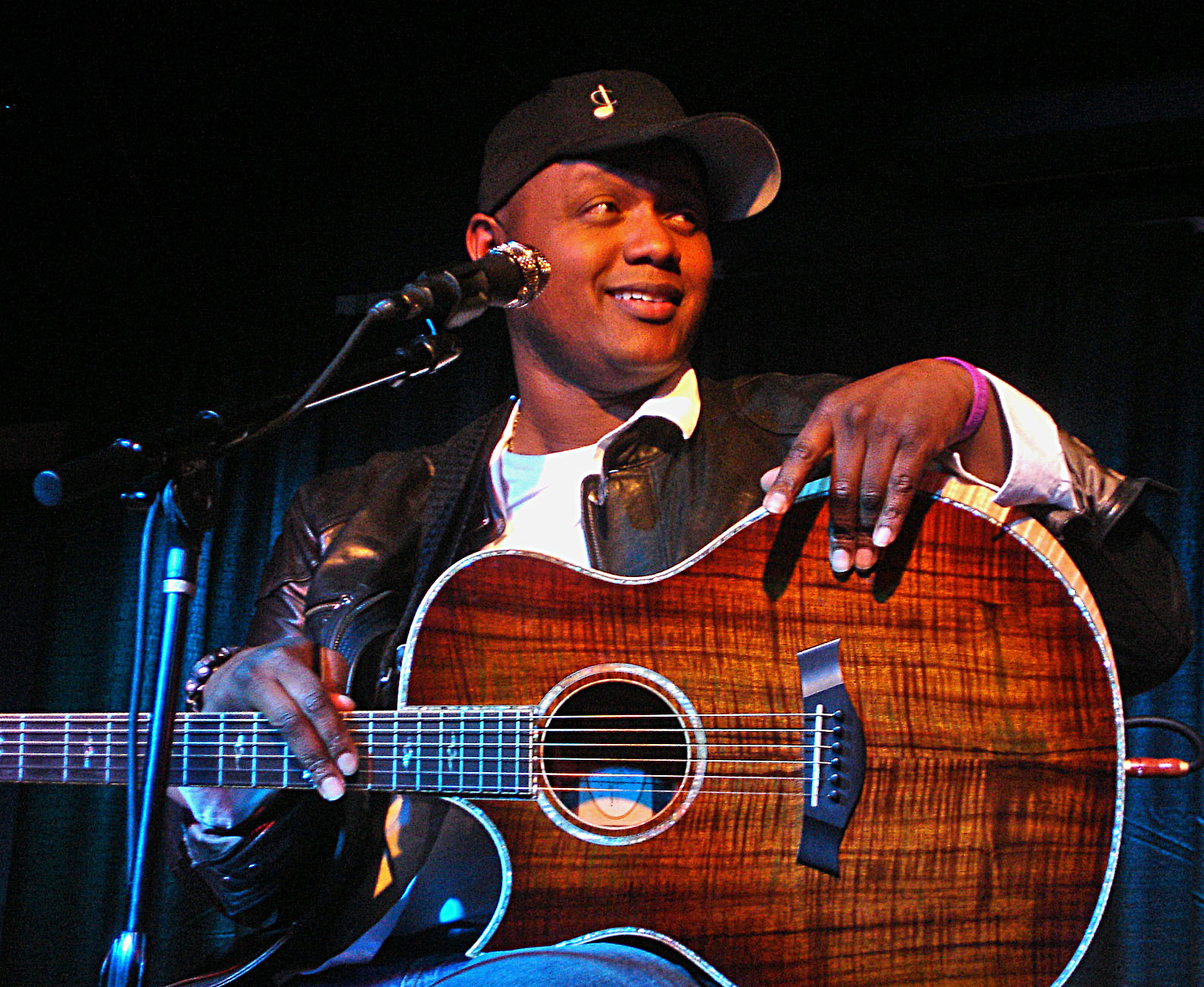
Colon with his guitar during a December 2014 performance

Javier Colon released his third album Come Through For You on Universal Republic Records on November 21, 2011. The debut single from the album is "As Long As We Got Love" and features Natasha Bedingfield. The album also includes "Stand Up", a song that features his mentor during The Voice, Adam Levine, and a song "Raise Your Hand", co-written by Season 8 American Idol Winner, Kris Allen.

A year after winning The Voice and being signed by Universal, Colon announced his departure from the record label through BuddyTV on June 7, 2012, stating the lack of support for his latest album Come Through for You, and his first after win, as the reason. In his statement he says: "I went into it with high hopes, as I believe everyone did. But when you pour your heart and soul into a new album that you think is really great, and your label who is supposed to support, market and promote your music does neither, it's really hard not to be upset. The truth is, we are all better off going our separate ways." Colon continues singing and looking for "a more mutually beneficial relationship".

In 2013, he launched the series Inside Voice, full title Inside Voice with Javier Colon, a weekly show broadcast on Back9Network that he co-hosts with Jenn Bosworth. In the show, they discuss the season 5 of The Voice.

In 2014, Concord Music Group announced the addition of Javier Colon to their list of artists. The label released his fourth album, Gravity in 2016.

== Discography ==
=== Albums ===
List of studio albums, with selected chart positions
| Title | Album details | Peak chart positions | |
| Title | Album details | US | US R&B |
|---|---|---|---|
| Javier | Released: August 5, 2003; Label: Capitol; Format: CD | 91 | 18 |
| Left of Center | Released: March 7, 2006; Label: Capitol; Format: CD | — | 37 |
| Come Through for You | Released: November 21, 2011; Label: Universal Republic; Format: CD, digital download | 134 | 20 |
| Gravity | Released: 2016; Label: Concord; Format: CD, digital download | — | — |

=== Extended plays ===
List of compilation albums, with selected details
| Title | Album details |
|---|---|
| The Truth – Acoustic EP | Released: 2010; Label: Javier Colon Music; Format: Digital download |
| A Very Acoustic Christmas | Released: 2011; Label: Universal Motown; Format: Digital download |

=== Singles ===
List of singles, with selected chart positions and parent album
| Title | Year | Peak chart positions | | | Album |
| Title | Year | US | US R&B | CAN | Album |
|---|---|---|---|---|---|
| "Crazy" | 2003 | 95 | 42 | — | Javier |
| "Beautiful U R" | 2003 | — | 75 | — | Javier |
| "Indecent Proposal" | 2006 | — | — | — | Left of Center |
| "Dance For Me" | 2006 | — | — | — | Left of Center |
| "The Answer Is Yes" | 2006 | — | — | — | Left of Center |
| "Time After Time" | 2011 | 65 | — | 33 | Non-album releases by The Voice |
| "Stand By Me" (with Angela Wolff) | 2011 | — | — | — | Non-album releases by The Voice |
| "Angel" | 2011 | 64 | — | 18 | Non-album releases by The Voice |
| "Fix You" | 2011 | 52 | — | 16 | Non-album releases by The Voice |
| "Stitch by Stitch" | 2011 | 17 | 57 | 28 | Non-album releases by The Voice |
| "Man in the Mirror" (with coach Adam Levine) | 2011 | 45 | 57 | 28 | Non-album releases by The Voice |
| "As Long as We Got Love" (featuring Natasha Bedingfield) | 2011 | — | — | — | Come Through for You |
| "A Drop in the Ocean" | 2012 | — | — | — | Come Through for You |
| "Clear the Air" | 2017 | — | — | — | Gravity |

== Filmography ==
=== Television ===
| Year | Title | Role | Notes |
|---|---|---|---|
| 2011 | The Voice | Himself / Contestant | Season 1 winner |
| 2011 | Real Magic TV | Himself | Interview, Magic and Performance |
| 2011 | The Playboy Club | Ray Charles | Episode: "Trouble in Makeoutsville" (unaired) |

== Tours ==
Supporting

- The Voice Live on Tour (2011)

Opening

- 2011 Summer Tour (2011) (with Maroon 5 and Train)
- Hands All Over Tour (2012) (with Maroon 5)
- Overexposed Tour (2012) (with Maroon 5)

== Awards and nominations ==
| Year | Presenter | Award | Result |
|---|---|---|---|
| 2011 | 2011 Teen Choice Awards | Breakout Artist | Nominated |

| Year | Presenter | Award | Result |
|---|---|---|---|
| 2025 | 2025 Emmy Award | Won for his contribution to a PSA featuring his version of "Auld Lang Syne" for Hartford HealthCare, recognized by the National Academy of Television Arts and Sciences - New England Chapter. | Won |

Awards and achievements
| Preceded by N/A | The Voice (American); Winner; 2011 (Spring) | Succeeded by Jermaine Paul |
| Preceded by N/A | The Voice (American); Winner's song "Stitch by Stitch"; 2011 (Spring) | Succeeded by "I Believe I Can Fly" |
