= Stitch by Stitch =

Single by Javier Colon
- Released: June 28, 2011
- Recorded: June 2011
- Genre: Pop
- Length: 3:16
- Label: Universal Republic
- Songwriters: Dave Bassett; David Hodges; Lindy Robbins
- Producer: Rodney "Darkchild" Jerkins

Javier Colon singles chronology
"Stitch by Stitch"	"As Long as We Got Love"

Audio sample
- file; help

"Stitch by Stitch" is the winner's song of the first ever American The Voice by Javier Colon, the winner of the first season of the show.

== Promotion ==
Colon performed it on the finals of the show on June 28, 2011 and it was released immediately following the end of the show. Colon was declared the winner on the basis of this "original song" on the final results show on June 29, 2011. "Stitch by Stitch" debuted at number 17 on the Billboard Hot 100. On July 7, 2011 Colon performed "Stitch by Stitch" on The Tonight Show with Jay Leno.

== Commercial performance ==
In its first week of release, the song sold 145,000 copies, debuting and peaking at number 17 on the US Billboard Hot 100 chart. A week later the song fell to number 96. It was the biggest single-week downward movement on the Hot 100 until "Move Ya Hips" by ASAP Ferg surpassed it by dropping 80 positions on the chart from number 19 to number 99 in August 2020.

== Charts ==
Chart (2011)	Peak position
Canadian Hot 100	28
US Billboard Hot 100	17
