= Beverly McClellan =

American singer (1969-2018)

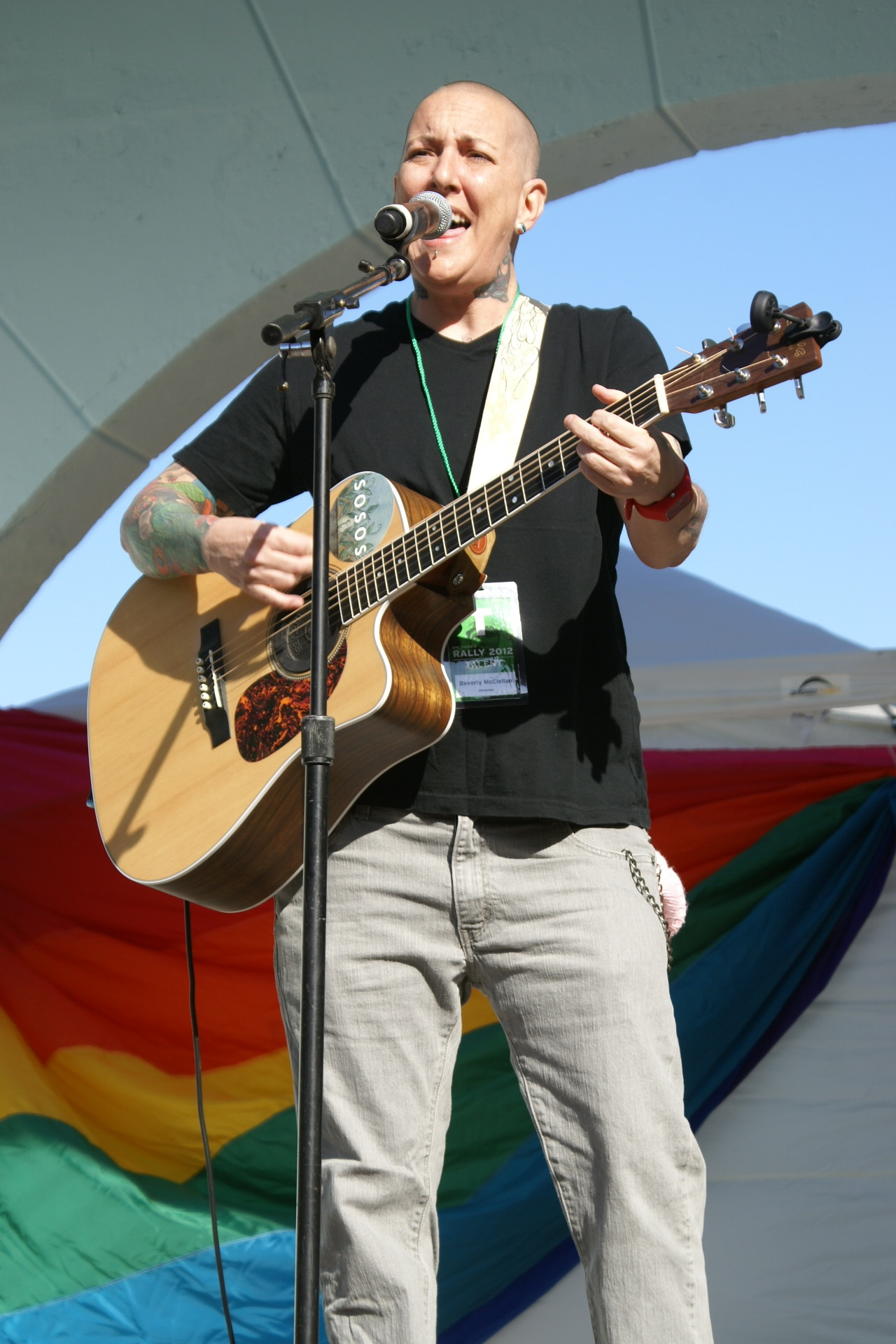
- McClellan performing in June 2012

Background information
- Born: July 6, 1969; Kingsport, Tennessee, U.S.
- Died: October 30, 2018 (aged 49) Fort Lauderdale, Florida, U.S.
- Genres: Blues, rock, folk
- Occupation: Singer
- Instruments: Vocals, piano, guitar, trumpet, French horn, mandolin, ukulele, bass guitar, djembe, drums and percussions
- Years active: 1990–2018
- Labels: Junk Drawer Records, Indie
- Formerly of: Steve Vai
- Website: bevmcclellanrobynfear.com

Beverly McClellan (July 6, 1969 – October 30, 2018) was an American singer and a contestant in the 1st season of the American TV series The Voice, reaching the final four.

At age four, McClellan started playing the piano and later learned to play guitar, trumpet, French horn, mandolin, ukulele, bass guitar, djembe and a wide variety of drums and percussion. She started singing at age 24 and had been performing at clubs in and bars around Fort Lauderdale, Florida, for 20 years. She had won the New York National Music Festival in 2004 as Best Overall Performer amongst 500 contestants.

== Biography ==
She was born in Kingsport, Tennessee, and raised in Gate City, Virginia. McClellan studied at South Fork High School and then at Indian River Community College in Fort Pierce, Florida. Her paternal grandmother was a Native American of Mohawk descent. To honor her, McClellan had tattoos representing a variety of different aspects of her grandmother's heritage.

She first played with Tami Gordon in a duo called Uncommon Ground. After that she worked with singer, songwriter, guitarist Robyn Fear in the Florida Keys and south Florida region. Years later, she formed her own band called DJ's Daughter, named after her mother. She recorded a few songs with that band, played many gigs for years before beginning to perform as a solo act. She then recorded another two albums on her own before joining Swoop, another band from Fort Lauderdale, Florida. While she was in the recording studio, her producer invited her to try out for the first season of The Voice. Prior to auditioning for the show, McClellan had already recorded five independent albums without having been signed by any record label. She was coached by Christina Aguilera and finished in 3rd/4th place in the competition.

=== Performances on The Voice ===
Stage	Song	Original Artist	Date	Order	Result
Blind Audition	"Piece of My Heart"	Erma Franklin	April 26, 2011	1.15	Adam and Christina turned Joined Team Christina
Battles (Top 32)	"Baba O'Riley" (vs. Justin Grennan)	The Who	May 17, 2011	4.4	Saved by Coach
Quarterfinals	"I'm the Only One"	Melissa Etheridge	June 14, 2011	8.3	Saved by Public Vote
Semifinals	"The Thrill Is Gone"	B.B. King	June 21, 2011	9.5	Saved by Coach and Public Vote (107 Points)
Live Finale (Final 4)	"Lovesick" (Original)	Beverly McClellan	June 28, 2011	11.4	3rd/4th place
Live Finale (Final 4)	"Beautiful" (with Christina Aguilera)	Christina Aguilera	June 28, 2011	11.7	3rd/4th place

McClellan was an openly lesbian artist. In June 2011, she appeared on the cover of SHE magazine, a South Florida lesbian magazine. She also recorded lead vocals for the song "John the Revelator" on Steve Vai's 2012 album The Story of Light, and toured with Vai the same year.

== Illness and death ==
Beverly McClellan was diagnosed with stage 3c endometrial cancer in March 2018 and performed her final show on the 24th. She died on October 30, 2018, in Fort Lauderdale, Florida.

== Discography ==
=== Albums ===
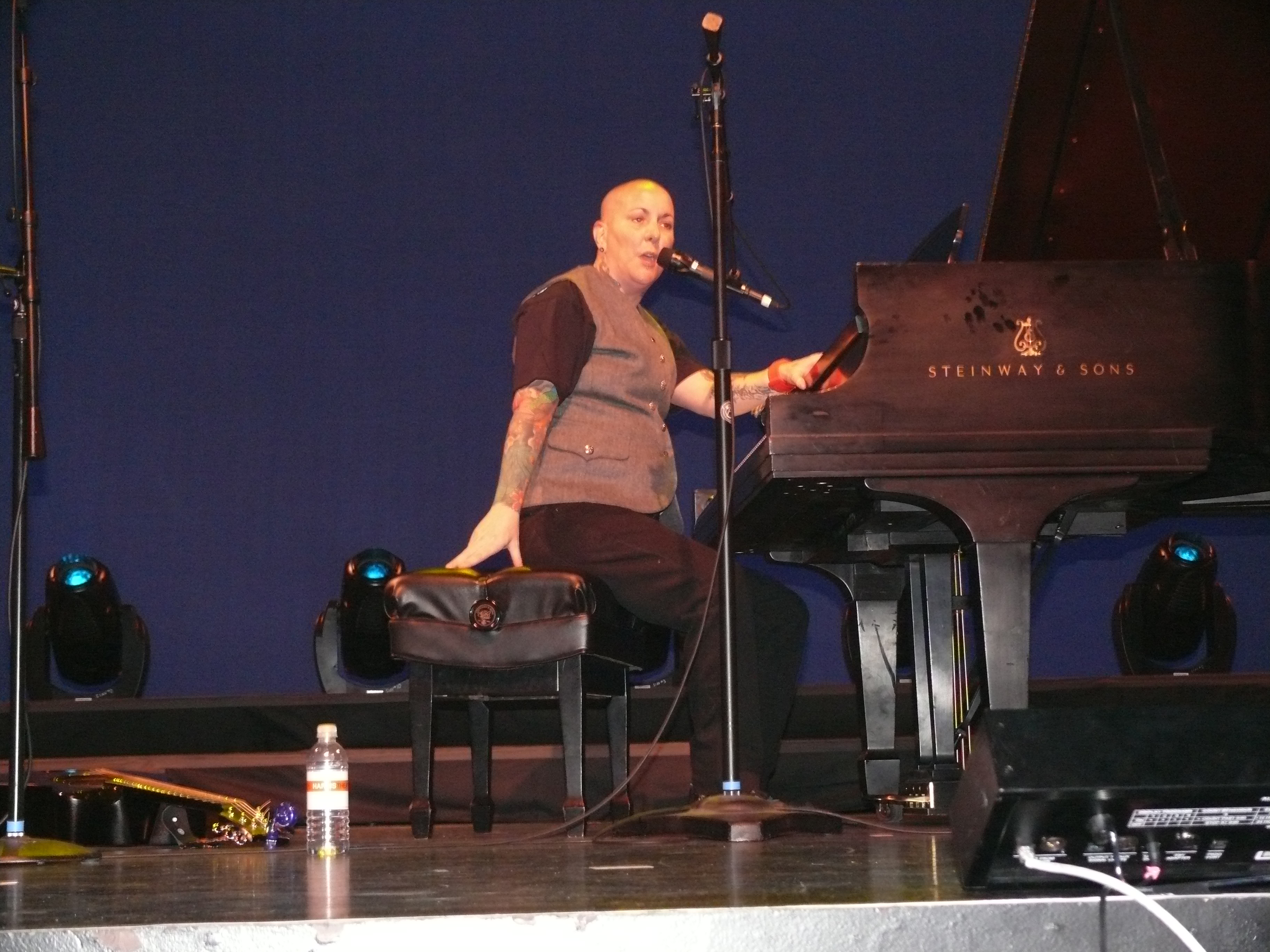
Beverly McClellan at IML 2013 in Chicago

(All independent releases on own label)

- Uncommon Ground
- Back to My Roots
- As a Girl
- Talk of the Town (2003)
- Beverly McClellan (2011)
- Fear Nothing (2011)

=== Singles ===
Year	Single	Peak positions		Album
Year	Single	US	CAN	Album
2011	"Piece of My Heart"	—	63	The Voice
2011	"Baba O'Riley" (featuring Justin Grennan)	—	—	The Voice
2011	"I'm the Only One"	—	—	The Voice
2011	"The Thrill Is Gone"	123	71	The Voice
2011	"Beautiful" (featuring Christina Aguilera)	74	—	The Voice
2011	"Lovesick"	111	42	The Voice
