= Tje Austin =

American R&B singer-songwriter

Tje Austin, pronounced TYE, is an American R&B singer-songwriter based in Austin, Texas. He is also a former contestant of NBC's singing competition The Voice.

== Early life ==
Tje Austin was born in Honolulu, Hawaii, and adopted by a Mormon couple when he was four days old. He comes from a large multicultural family with five brothers and three sisters, six of his siblings being adopted from different families.

== Media appearances ==
In April 2011, Austin auditioned for NBC's American version of the Dutch hit singing competition, The Voice. After singing "Just The Way You Are" by Bruno Mars for his Blind Audition, both Adam Levine and Cee Lo Green turned around, offering him the chance to be on either team. Austin who, with his smooth control, reminded the [coaches] of Cee Lo himself, decided on Cee Lo Green.

During the battle rounds, Austin was paired against teammate Nakia to sing Closer by Ne-Yo. Though guest advisor Monica urged Cee Lo to choose Austin insisting that a string of singers would die to have his melodic voice, Cee Lo picked Nakia and Austin was eliminated from the competition.

== Discography ==
=== Albums ===
- Love Me Knots, Between The Lines Productions 2008
- Xperience, Browns Town Music, LLC 2010
- Dreamin' Big, Browns Town Music, LLC 2012
- I Belong To You, Falling Giants Music LLC, 2017

=== Singles and soundtracks ===
- "Away From You", 2008
- "Today, Tomorrow" (Noah's Arc: Jumping The Broom, 2008)
- "Sunshine", 2010
- "Nice and Slow", 2010
- "The City Of Me", 2011
- "Just The Way You Are" (The Voice, 2011)
- "Closer" – Nakia and Tje Austin, (The Voice, 2011)
- "Hello Stranger", 2011
- "Right For You", 2012
