= Elenowen =

American musical duo

- Genre: Folk rock
- Years active: 2010–present
- Labels: Ready. Set. Records! Dualtone Records
- Members: Josh Johnson; Nicole Johnson
- Website: http://www.elenowen.com/

Elenowen is an American singer-songwriter/folk rock musical duo, composed of married couple Josh and Nicole Johnson. Elenowen released their debut album, Pulling Back The Veil. In 2011, the duo also appeared on the first season of NBC's The Voice. The duo followed up with a 5-song self-titled EP, released May 2012.

== Biography ==
The duo released their first album, Pulling Back The Veil, in 2010. The tracks on Pulling Back The Veil are inspired by the couple's own relationship. "The first year of marriage had major ups and downs for us, and gave us a lot of inspiration to write", said Nicole.

Josh and Nicole began filming impromptu performances in their small basement apartment, with the resulting clips – called ‘The Basement Sessions’ – quickly garnering a following on YouTube and the No Depression website.

In 2011, Elenowen made their national television debut on the premiere season of NBC's The Voice. Elenowen followed up this success with a 5-song self-titled EP in 2012 (Dualtone Records). The couple teamed up with acclaimed songwriter Trent Dabbs and co-producer Phillip LaRue to help pen tracks for the EP. The single "Honey Come Home" also reached #1 on the iTunes Singer-songwriter charts.

Songs from Pulling Back The Veil were featured on popular TV programs "One Tree Hill", MTV's "World of Jenks", Army Wives, and CW's Reign. "Run" (a single written with LaRue) was used in One Tree Hill season 9. Another single, "No Such Thing as Time", was featured in Pretty Little Liars season 3 and One Tree Hill season 9. "Bittersweet" (from the 2012 EP) was included on the first season of NBC's Reign. "The Place From Where I Fell" was featured in "You Me Her" season 1. "Hiding Place" was included in Global TV's "Private Eyes".

Elenowen released their third studio album "For the Taking" on January 20, 2015. "For the Taking" was the duo's first release with Ready. Set. Records! and was co-produced by Jeremy Bose and Trent Dabbs.

== Discography ==
=== Albums ===
Album title	Release date	Record label
Elenowen – EP	May 29, 2012	Dualtone Records
Pulling Back the Veil	January 19, 2014	Self-released
For the Taking	January 20, 2015	Ready. Set. Records!
Versions	August 23, 2019	Self-released
Say I Don't Scare You	November 5, 2021	Tone Tree Music

=== Singles ===
Title	Release date	Record label
"Run"	February 14, 2012	Self-released
"No Such Thing as Time"	November 29, 2011	Self-released
"Honey Come Home"	June 7, 2011	Self-released
"Ain't No Mountain High Enough" (The Voice performance)	May 17, 2011	Universal Republic Records
"Falling Slowly" (The Voice performance)	April 26, 2011	Universal Republic Records
