= Casey Desmond =

American singer-songwriter (born 1986)

- Born: June 25, 1986 (age 40)
- Origin: Boston, Massachusetts, US
- Genres: Indie, pop
- Occupations: Singer-songwriter, musician
- Instruments: Guitar, piano, synths, accordion, programming, omnichord
- Years active: 2004–2012
- Label: Sound Museum
- Website: caseydesmond.com

Casey Patricia Desmond (born June 25, 1986) is an American pop singer-songwriter and musician.

== Early life ==
Desmond was born in Boston, Massachusetts, to parents Bill and Katherine Desmond, two Boston musicians and founders of Bentmen, a local Boston band, and the Sound Museum Music Complex.

== Career ==
She was a contestant on NBC's The Voice, on a team coached by Adam Levine of Maroon 5. She sang "Born This Way" by Lady Gaga during blind auditions. On the May 31, 2011, episode of The Voice, Desmond was the fourth member of Levine's team of eight to be eliminated after competing head to head with Jeff Jenkins. They performed Elton John's "Don't Let the Sun Go Down on Me".

== Discography ==
- Casey Desmond (2005)
- No Disguise (2007)
- Chilly Allston (2008)
- Deja Vu (2012)
