= Nakia =

American singer-songwriter

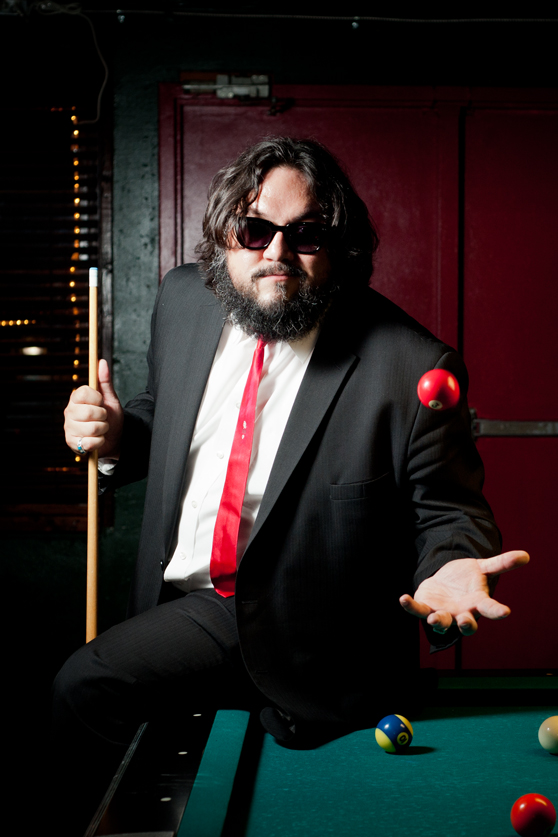

Background information
- Born: Nakia Daniel Reynoso; February 20, 1975 (age 51)
- Origin: Virginia Beach, Virginia
- Genres: Soul, blues, rock, folk, Americana
- Occupations: Singer-songwriter, recording artist, actor
- Instruments: vocals, piano, organ
- Years active: 1998–present
- Website: www.nakia.net

Nakia Daniel Reynoso (born February 20, 1975), known professionally as Nakia, is an American musician, singer-songwriter and actor living in Austin, Texas. He is a native of Fort Payne, Alabama.

== Professional background ==
Nakia moved to Austin in 2002 from Chicago, where he had been working as an intern for Aware Records. After arriving in Austin, Nakia began to pursue a solo career but was first noticed by Fastball guitarist and co-founder, Miles Zuniga. Zuniga recruited Nakia to join his rock and roll lounge act side project, The Small Stars.

Each member of The Small Stars had an alter-ego and complete back story. Nakia created the character, "Vic Odin", who was described as a sleazy, double-crossing, British manager. He left the band in 2006.

In 2006, Nakia performed in theatrical productions of The Music Man and Rocky Horror Show. He also had a role in the independent film Lone Star Blues. Nakia soon became a featured singer at many local Austin venues and a favorite among many Austin music critics. In 2022, he appeared in an episode titled "Dueling Pianos", in the web series Skeleton Crew.

== Recording background ==
Playing the Cards

In winter 2007, Nakia released the EP Playing The Cards. He formed the band Southern Cousins and the band began receiving positive reviews of their live shows. The band would go on to share stages with Willie Nelson and B. B. King and perform at events such as South Padre International Music Festival and Austin City Limits Music Festival.

Water to Wine

On April 14, 2009, Nakia release his first full-length album, Water To Wine. Produced by Mac McNabb, the album features songs written by Nakia, Michael Fracasso, and Monte Warden. The album was well received by local and national media.

Street Songs of Love

In November 2009, Alejandro Escovedo invited Nakia to participate in his "Sessions on South Congress" performances at the Continental Club in Austin, Texas. Nakia went on to record backing vocals for Street Songs of Love, featuring songs that were originally presented during the Continental Club sessions. This collaborative effort provided an opportunity for Nakia to work with rock producer Tony Visconti. The album was released in June 2010.

Drown in the Crimson Tide

It was announced in February 2013 that Nakia would be releasing a new EP on March 5, 2013. The record features songs written with Chris Seefried, Aris Archontis, Barry Goldberg, Bleu, and Brian West. Three of the tracks were produced by Barry Goldberg and Johnny Lee Schell.

== Media appearances ==
In April 2011, Nakia announced that he had auditioned for the American edition of The Voice, NBC's new singing competition. This was confirmed when NBC released two separate commercials featuring Nakia's "Blind Audition." Nakia's hope in auditioning for the series was to be able to pay back his partner for supporting his music career. Nakia chose Cee Lo Green to be his coach after singing his song, "Forget You". Nakia also moved on from the Battle Rounds to the Live Shows after beating Tje Austin. Cee Lo chose him to be a quarter-finalist. On June 22, 2011, Nakia was voted off the show, finishing in seventh place after being beaten by Vicci Martinez in the semi-finals. On June 28, 2011, Nakia was a guest on Kevin Smith's Plus One Per Diem internet radio show.

=== Performances on The Voice ===
Stage	Song	Original Artist	Date	Order	Result
Blind Audition	"Forget You"	CeeLo Green	May 3, 2011	2.12	CeeLo and Blake turned Joined Team CeeLo
Battles (Top 32)	"Closer" (vs. Tje Austin)	Ne-Yo	May 17, 2011	4.2	Saved by Coach
Quarterfinals	"Sex on Fire"	Kings of Leon	June 14, 2011	8.5	Saved by Coach
Semifinals	"Whataya Want from Me"	Adam Lambert	June 21, 2011	9.2	Eliminated (76 Points)

== Discography ==
- 2007: Playing the Cards
- 2009: Water to Wine
- 2010: Street Songs of Love (collaboration with Alejandro Escovedo)
- 2013: Drown in the Crimson Tide
- 2018: Blues Grifter
