= Vicci Martinez =

American musician and actress

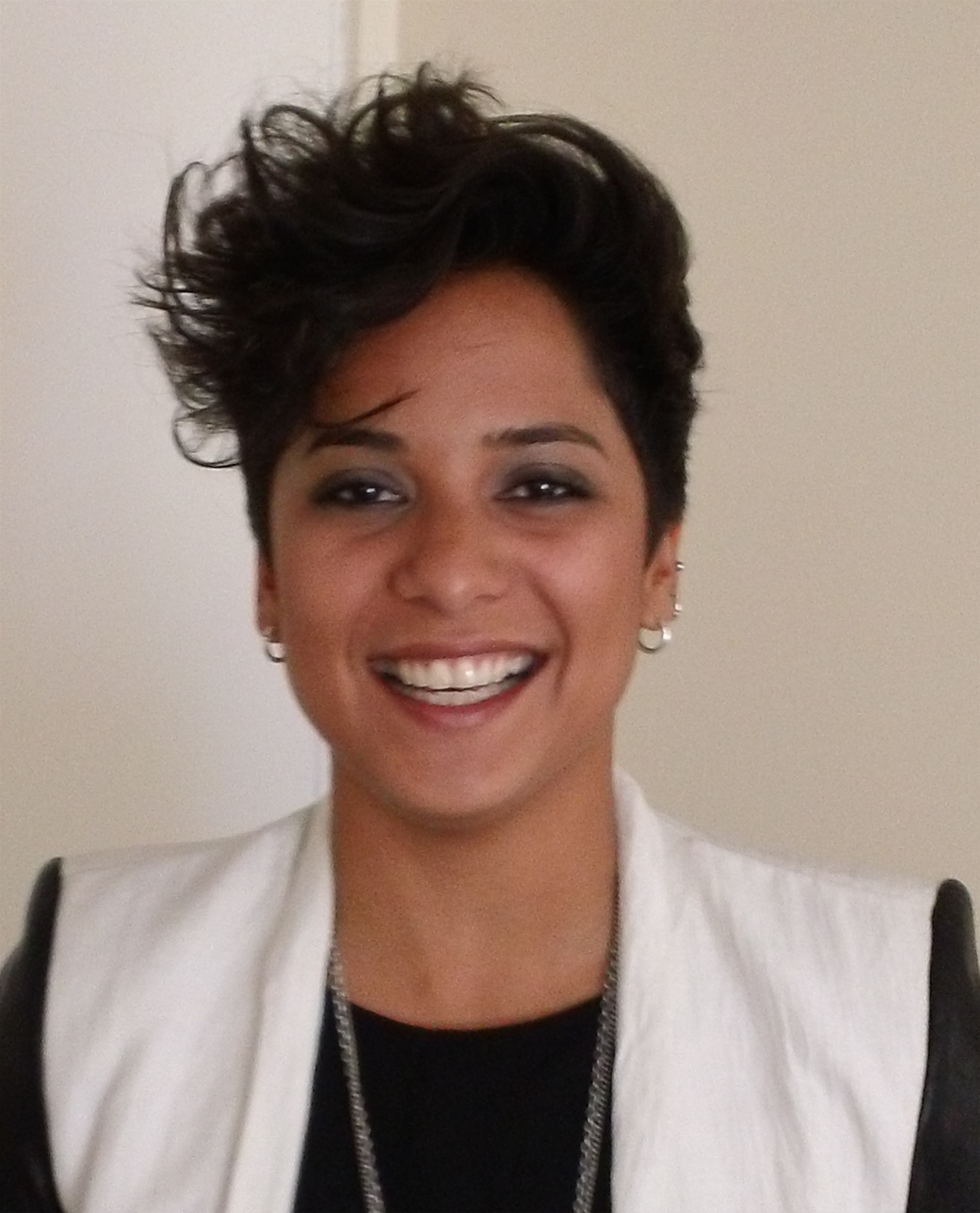
- Martinez at the 2012 Gracie Awards

Background information
- Origin: Tacoma, Washington, United States
- Genres: Pop, rock
- Occupations: Singer, Songwriter
- Instruments: Vocals, acoustic guitar, electric guitar, percussion
- Years active: 2000 – present
- Label: Republic
- Partner: Emily Tarver (2018-present)

Vicci Martinez is an American singer/songwriter and actress from Tacoma, Washington. She came in joint third on NBC's singing competition series The Voice in 2011. She released her 2012 album with Republic Records (Universal Music Group), but self-released her 2015 album.

== Career ==
After the 2005 release of Martinez's album On My Way, she went on tour and released a full-length concert DVD and documentary in 2006 titled Vicci Martinez Live. The DVD, produced by Joel Veatch and Flying Spot, received positive press attention. Vicci also released a live CD that had been recorded at Jazzbones, a musical venue in Tacoma, Washington.

Martinez won the regional tryouts for the first season of American Idol, but declined her invitation to the second round on the grounds that, in her opinion, the contract was too restrictive. She later appeared on CBS's 2003 season of Star Search.

In 2011, Martinez competed on the U.S. talent show The Voice. Billboard magazine praised her diverse performance abilities saying "she gives every song a mature delivery and she appears comfortable in whatever skin she has chosen to adopt on a given night. With a taiko drum ensemble alongside her and a backstory about her late father to warm the heart, she tore through Florence and the Machine's "Dog Days Are Over" with alacrity; the closing performance Tuesday was also the night's best performance." Martinez came in first place on judge CeeLo Green's team and represented him in the final round. She finished third overall.

=== Performances on The Voice ===
Stage	Song	Original Artist	Date	Order	Result
Blind Audition	"Rolling in the Deep"	Adele	April 26, 2011	1.4	Two chairs turned Joined Team CeeLo
Battles (Top 32)	"Perfect" (vs. Niki Dawson)	P!nk	May 17, 2011	3.4	Saved by Coach
Quarterfinals	"Jolene"	Dolly Parton	June 14, 2011	8.3	Saved by Public Vote
Semifinals	"Dog Days Are Over"	Florence and The Machine	June 21, 2011	9.8	Saved by Coach and Public Vote (138 Points)
Live Finale (Final 4)	"Afraid to Sleep" (Original)	Javier Colon	June 28, 2011	11.3	3rd/4th Place
Live Finale (Final 4)	"Love is a Battlefield" (with CeeLo Green)	Pat Benatar	June 28, 2011	11.8	3rd/4th Place

According to her Voice coach, CeeLo Green, after her appearance on the show in 2011, Martinez signed a record deal. Her EP, Come Along, was released on May 1, 2012, followed by her Universal Republic album Vicci on June 19 of the same year.

Her 2012 chart hit, "Come Along", a cover of a 2001 single from Swedish recording act Titiyo, featured Cee Lo Green. Though the song was a top 20 hit throughout Central Europe, it was not released in the U.S. or U.K. The song peaked at #20 on the Adult Alternative Airplay chart and #17 on the Adult Top 40 chart.

On May 1, 2015, Martinez self-released her album, I Am Vicci Martinez.

In 2018, after being discovered by the casting director via a google search, Martinez played inmate Daddy on season 6 of the Netflix series Orange Is the New Black. Martinez also appeared in the seventh and final season.

== Personal life ==
Martinez identifies as lesbian. She has been in a relationship with her Orange Is the New Black co-star Emily Tarver since July 2018.

== Discography ==
=== Albums ===
- 2000: VMB
- 2003: Sleep to Dream
- 2005: On My Way
- 2006: Vicci Martinez Live
- 2007: I Could Be a Boxer
- 2009: From the Outside In
- 2010: I Love You in the Morning
- 2011: Live From Jazzbones
- 2012: Vicci (Universal Republic)
- 2015: I Am Vicci

=== EPs ===
- 2012: Come Along (Universal Republic)
- 2015: I Am

=== Singles ===
Title	Year	Peak chart positions		Album
Title	Year	US	CAN	Album
"Jolene"	2011	76	—	Non-album releases from The Voice
"Dog Days Are Over"	2011	68	—	Non-album releases from The Voice
"Love Is a Battlefield" (featuring CeeLo Green)	2011	102	—	Non-album releases from The Voice
"Afraid to Sleep"	2011	78	26	Non-album releases from The Voice
"Come Along" (featuring Cee Lo Green)	2012	—	—	Vicci
"I Can Love"	2013	—	—	Vicci
"Otra Cancion"	2014	—	—	I Am Vicci

== Filmography ==
=== Film ===
Year	Title	Role	Notes
2008	Limbo	Gal at restaurant	

=== Television ===
Year	Title	Role	Notes
2003	Star Search	Herself	2 episodes
2011–2015	The Voice	Herself	3 episodes
2018–2019	Orange Is the New Black	Dominga "Daddy" Duarte	Recurring role (season 6) Guest role (season 7) 12 episodes
2023−2024	Clone High	Frida Kahlo	Voice role; (season 2 − 3)
