= List of Salvadoran Americans =

This is a list of notable Salvadoran Americans, including both original immigrants who obtained American citizenship and their American descendants.

To be included in this list, the person must have a Wikipedia article showing they are Salvadoran American or must have references showing they are Salvadoran American and are notable.

== Athletes ==
=== Baseball players ===
- Steve Rodriguez - former second baseman/shortstop in Major League Baseball

=== Boxers ===
- Carlos Hernández

=== Football players ===
- McLeod Bethel-Thompson - NFL quarterback
- José Cortéz - former NFL placekicker

=== Martial artists ===
- Edwin Figueroa - American mixed martial artist currently competing in the bantamweight division of the UFC

=== Soccer players ===
- Arturo Alvarez
- Efrain Burgos, Jr. - Salvadoran American; son of former footballer Efrain Burgos
- Derby Carrillo
- Dustin Corea
- Joe Corona
- Gerson Mayen
- Carlos Menjívar
- Edwin Miranda
- Hugo Pérez - former US national team player
- Joshua Perez
- Pablo Punyed
- Steve Purdy
- Alex Roldan
- Cristian Roldan
- Ricardo Ulloa
- Benji Villalobos
- Eriq Zavaleta
- Gabriel Granillo

== Tennis players ==
- Marcelo Arévalo
- Rafael Arévalo
- Rosemary Casals

== Businesspeople and entrepreneurs ==
- Abigail Folger - coffee heiress of Folgers; murdered by the Manson Family in 1969

== Entertainment ==
=== Actors and actresses ===
- Linda Arsenio
- Adrian Bellani
- Maurice Benard
- Lisseth Chavez
- J. R. Martinez
- Rolando Molina
- J. D. Pardo
- Mari Possa
- Izabela Rose
- Liamani Segura
- Brennan Mejia
- Ana Villafañe
- Denyse Tontz
- Efren Ramirez

=== Authors and poets ===
- Consuelo de Saint-Exupéry - writer, poet, sculptor, wife of French writer and pioneering aviator Antoine de Saint-Exupéry
- Jose B. Gonzalez - author of Toys Made of Rock
- Francisco Machón Vilanova - novelist
- Marcos Villatoro - novelist

=== Comedians ===
- Julio Torres - comedian, writer for Saturday Night Live

=== Fashion ===
- Francesca Miranda - fashion designer

=== Journalists ===
- Markos Moulitsas - writer

=== Models ===
- Marisela Demontecristo
- Christy Turlington
- Zuleika Soler

=== Musicians and music groups ===
- Joey Castillo - drummer for hard rock band Queens of the Stone Age and ex-drummer for Wasted Youth and Danzig
- Cáthia - competitor on reality television singing competition The Voice
- Fernando del Valle - operatic tenor
- Allison Iraheta - singer; Telemundo's Quinceañera winner and American Idol season 8 finalist
- DJ Keoki - techno DJ
- Sabi - singer
- Pete Sandoval - death metal drummer for Terrorizer and Morbid Angel
- Angelica - freestyle singer
- Denyse Tontz - American songwriter and performing artist
- Álvaro Torres
- Angelica Garcia
- Rican Da Menace - rapper

=== Visual arts ===
- Edwin E. Aguilar - television animator, character layout artist, assistant director on The Simpsons
- Mario Bencastro - painter
- RETNA - graffiti artist
- Vivienne Medrano - animator, illustrator, comic creator, and voice actress
- Nicolas F. Shi
- Marta Ayala
- Gabriela Alemán
- Thalia Gochez
- Kiara Aileen Machado
- Julie Tolentino

== Political figures ==
- Hala Ayala - Virginia State Delegate for District 51 in Prince William County, Virginia; Her father is Salvadoran.
- Wendy Carrillo - California State Assemblywoman for District 51 in Los Angeles County, California
- Anabel Figueroa - Stamford, Connecticut representative, former Connecticut State Representative for District 148 in Stamford, Connecticut
- Liz Figueroa - Democratic politician and former California state senator
- Ana Sol Gutierrez - former Maryland State Delegate for District 18 in Montgomery County, Maryland
- Monica Martinez - New York State Senator for District 4 in Suffolk County, New York; former State Senator for District 3 in Suffolk County, New York; former Suffolk County, New York Legislator
- Steve Montenegro - Speaker of the Arizona House of Representatives, representing District 29 in Maricopa County, Arizona, former representative for Districts 12 and 13, former Arizona State Senator representing District 13
- María Pérez - former member of the New Hampshire House of Representatives
- Victor R. Ramirez - former State Senate for District 47 in Prince George's County, Maryland
- Jessie Rodriguez - Wisconsin State Assemblyman for District 21 in Milwaukee County, Wisconsin
- Chris Sununu - former Republican Governor of New Hampshire. Brother of John E. Sununu and son of John H. Sununu
- John E. Sununu - former Republican senator and congressman from New Hampshire. First and only Salvadoran-American Member of Congress. Son of John H. Sununu and brother of Chris Sununu
- John H. Sununu - former Republican Governor of New Hampshire and White House Chief of Staff; mother is Salvadoran, of Arab descent.
- Yesli Vega - Republican member of the Prince William County, Virginia Board of Supervisors

== Religion ==
- Erwin McManus - lead pastor of Mosaic Church
- Santiago Mellado - president of Willow Creek Association

== Science and technology ==
- Bernard Lewinsky - Salvadoran-born American physician and medical researcher; father of Monica Lewinsky
- Francisco Rubio - NASA astronaut
- George Melendez Wright - biologist
- Alicia Nash - mental health advocate and physicist; wife of John Forbes Nash Jr.
