= Cáthia =

American singer

- Also known as: Cáthia
- Born: Catherine Ochoa; August 9, 1993 (age 33); Bronx, New York, U.S.
- Genres: Pop, latin pop
- Occupation: Singer
- Instrument: Vocals
- Years active: 2013–present
- Website: cathiamusic.com

Catherine Ochoa, known professionally as Cáthia is a Salvadoran American singer from Bronx, New York.

She rose to fame when she came in 13–16th place on the fourth season of the American version of reality television singing competition The Voice.

Cáthia released her first single "Without You" 47 days after her elimination on The Voice on June 24, 2013. Cáthia was the second Salvadoran American to participate on The Voice, after Adriana Louise who was on season three. Cáthia later participated in a reality television singing competition called "Yo Soy El Artista" (I Am The Artist) on Telemundo, where Cathia achieved a fourth-place finish, becoming the second Salvadoran American ever to advance to the final stages of a Telemundo singing competition production after Allison Iraheta.

== Early life and education ==
Cáthia was born in The Bronx in New York City to parents who immigrated from El Salvador. She attended high school at Fiorello H. LaGuardia High School, in New York City's Manhattan borough, where she was a vocal major and trained in opera, musical theater and learned how to play the piano as a teenager. As a senior in high school, she competed in the Apollo Theater Amateur Night, advancing to the semi-finals.

== Career ==
Cáthia auditioned for The Voice earning a three-chair turn from Shakira, Usher and Blake Shelton. She chose Shakira as her coach. In the battle round, Cáthia lost to Mary Miranda but was stolen by Usher. She advanced through the knockouts beating Ryan Innes. In the Top 16 Cáthia was eliminated. She performed twice in the finale – first with Judith Hill, Sasha Allen and Karina Iglesias; then with Michelle Chamuel, Josiah Hawley and VEDO.

In 2014, Cáthia competed on Telemundo's "Yo Soy El Artista", advancing to the final round and placing in the Top 5 of the competition. While on the show she worked with artists like Luis Fonsi and Olga Tañon, training in voice, dance and acting. From there, she went on to work on her EP Volar, debuting the title track single and video on Telemundo's "Al Rojo Vivo".

In 2017, Cáthia joined Prince Royce's band as part of the "FIVE" Tour, and remained the sole background vocalist in his band for over 2.5 years, touring the U.S., Europe and Latin America. She worked as a background and session vocalist for other artists like Luis Fonsi and Jennifer Lopez during this time, while releasing her EP "No Me Conoces" in 2018, a single "Bet It All" in 2019, and "De Una" in 2020, that same year, she sang backup for Jennifer Lopez on Dick Clark's New Year's Rocking Eve 2021.

=== Performances and results ===
– Studio version of performance reached the top 10 on iTunes

Stage	Song	Original Artist	Date	Order	Result
Blind Audition	"No Me Doy por Vencido"	Luis Fonsi	March 26, 2013	2.5	Shakira, Blake Shelton, and Usher turned Joined Team Shakira
Battle Rounds	"Antes de las Seis" (vs. Mary Miranda)	Shakira	April 23, 2013	10.6	Defeated; Stolen by Usher
Knockout Rounds	"Mr. Know It All" (vs. Ryan Innes)	Kelly Clarkson	April 30, 2013	12.8	Saved by Coach
Live Playoffs	"I Have Nothing"	Whitney Houston	May 6, 2013	14.4	Eliminated

== Influences ==
She cites Whitney Houston, Selena Quintanilla, Christina Aguilera and Mariah Carey as some of her vocal inspirations in her earlier years.

== Discography ==
=== Singles ===
Year	Single
2013	"Without You"
2016 (EP)	"Volar"
2018	"Como Amigo"
2018	"No Me Conoces"
2019	"Bet It All"

== See also ==
- List of Fiorello H. LaGuardia High School alumni
- List of Latin pop artists
- List of people from the Bronx
- List of Salvadoran Americans
- List of The Voice (U.S.) contestants
