= The Voice (American TV series) season 4 =

The Voice
- Season 4
- Promotional poster featuring coaches Levine, Usher, Shelton, and Shakira
- Hosted by: Carson Daly; Christina Milian (social media)
- Coaches: Adam Levine; Shakira; Usher; Blake Shelton
- No. of contestants: 48 artists
- Winner: Danielle Bradbery
- Winning coach: Blake Shelton
- Runner-up: Michelle Chamuel

Release
- Original network: NBC
- Original release: March 25 – June 18, 2013

Season chronology
- ← Previous; Season 3 Next → Season 5

The fourth season of the American reality talent show The Voice premiered on March 25, 2013, on NBC and was hosted by Carson Daly, while Christina Milian returned as the social media correspondent. Coaches Adam Levine, and Blake Shelton returned as coaches, both for their fourth season. CeeLo Green and Christina Aguilera appeared as performers instead of coaches. Two new coaches Shakira and Usher served as replacement coaches for Aguilera and Green, leaving Levine & Shelton the only coaches remaining from the inaugural season. The team sizes were trimmed back down to 12 per team (season 2's team size), with each coach having two 'steals' in the Battle Rounds.

Danielle Bradbery was named the winner of this season, marking Blake Shelton's third win as a coach. With Bradbery's win being the first youngest winner at age 16.

== Auditions, coaches, hosts, and team sizes ==
Auditions were held from January 12 to February 17, 2013, in Chicago, Atlanta, Los Angeles, Houston and New York City.

Carson Daly hosted for his fourth consecutive season, while Christina Milian returned for her third season as social media correspondent. The judges' line-up saw a change for the first time since the inception of the show. Joining coaches Adam Levine and Blake Shelton were Usher and Shakira. CeeLo Green and Christina Aguilera were substituted in order to focus on their music careers. However, Green and Aguilera would be returning in the following season.

Judges and Host(s) for The Voice Season 4

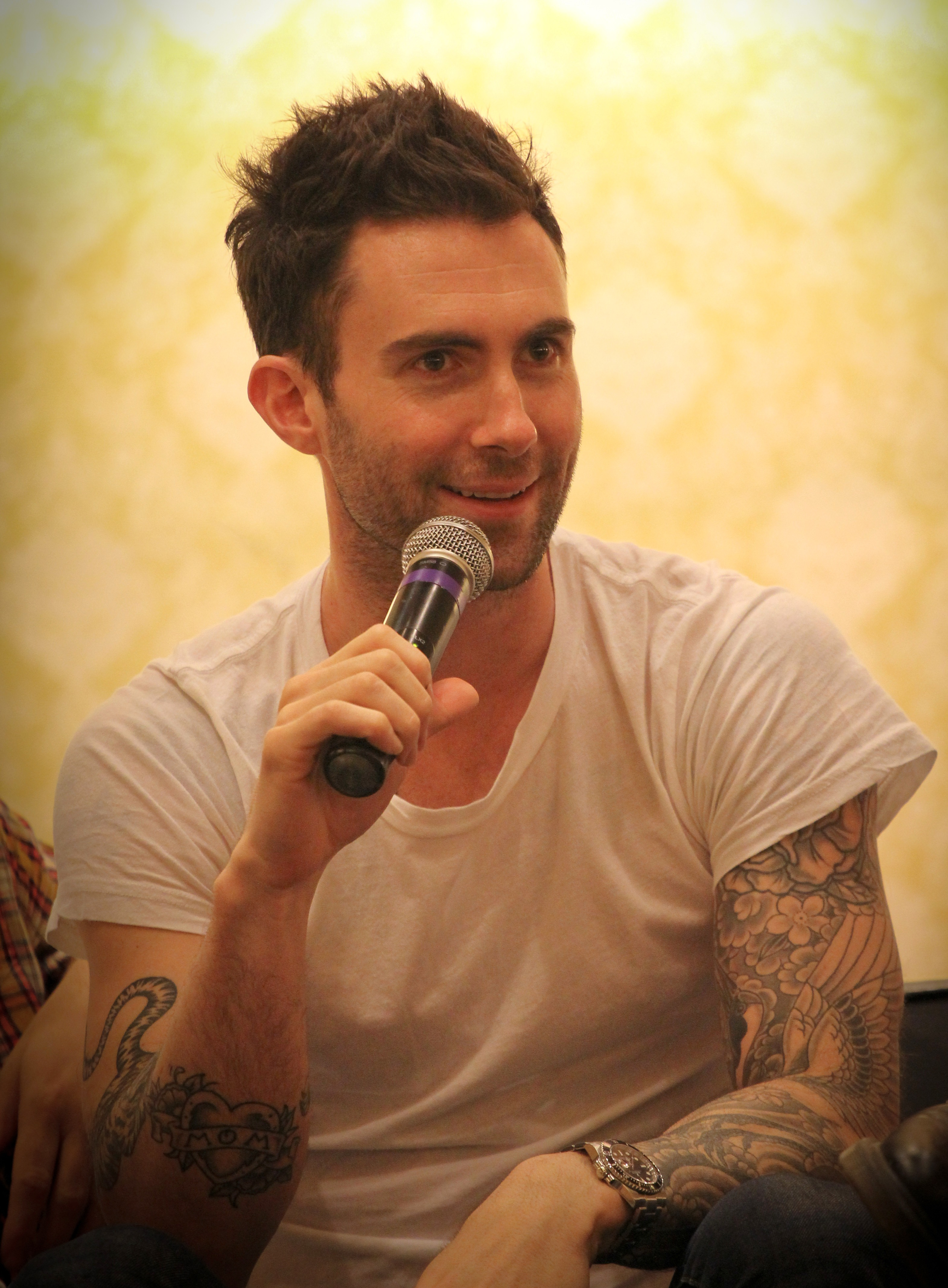
Adam Levine

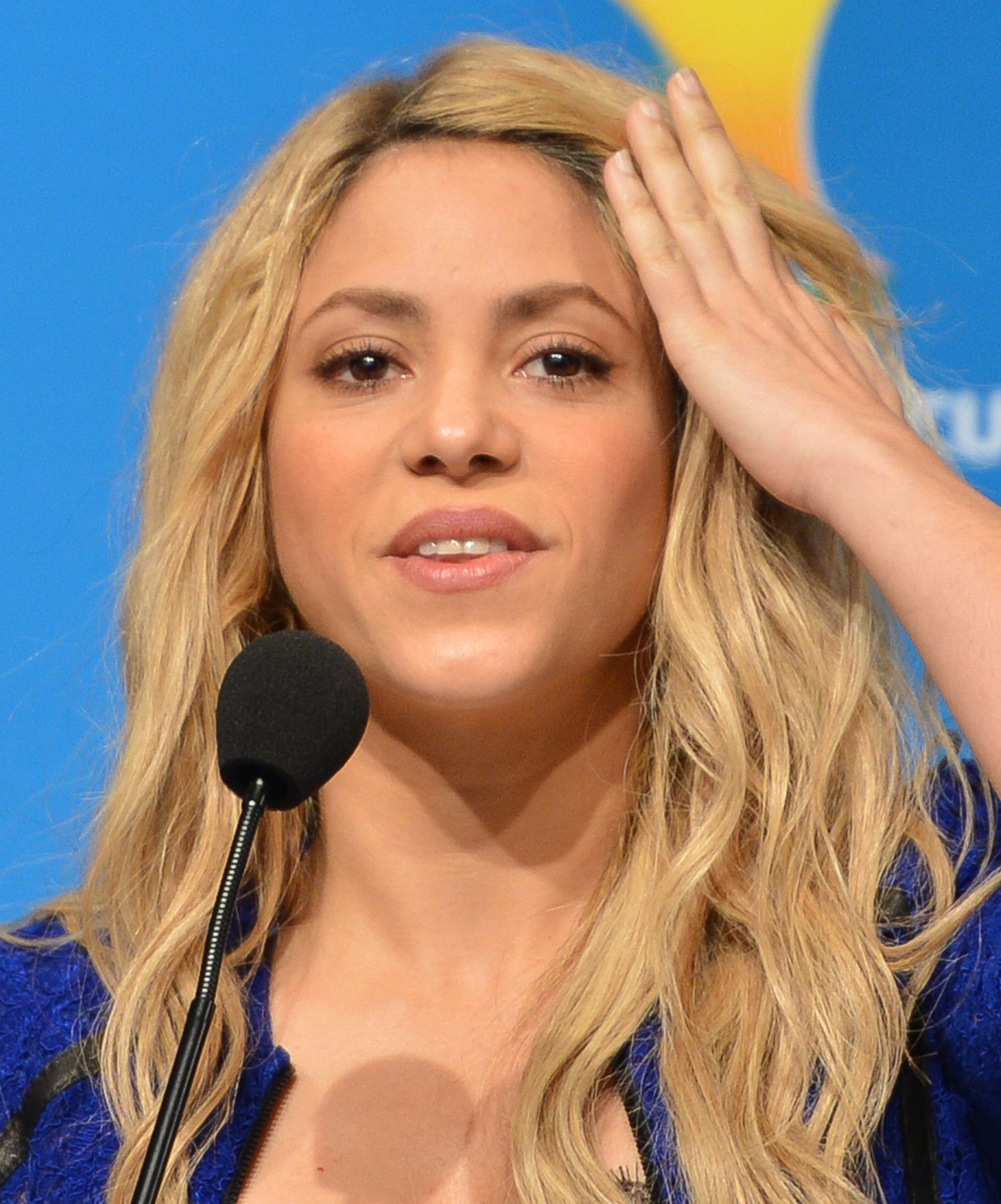
Shakira

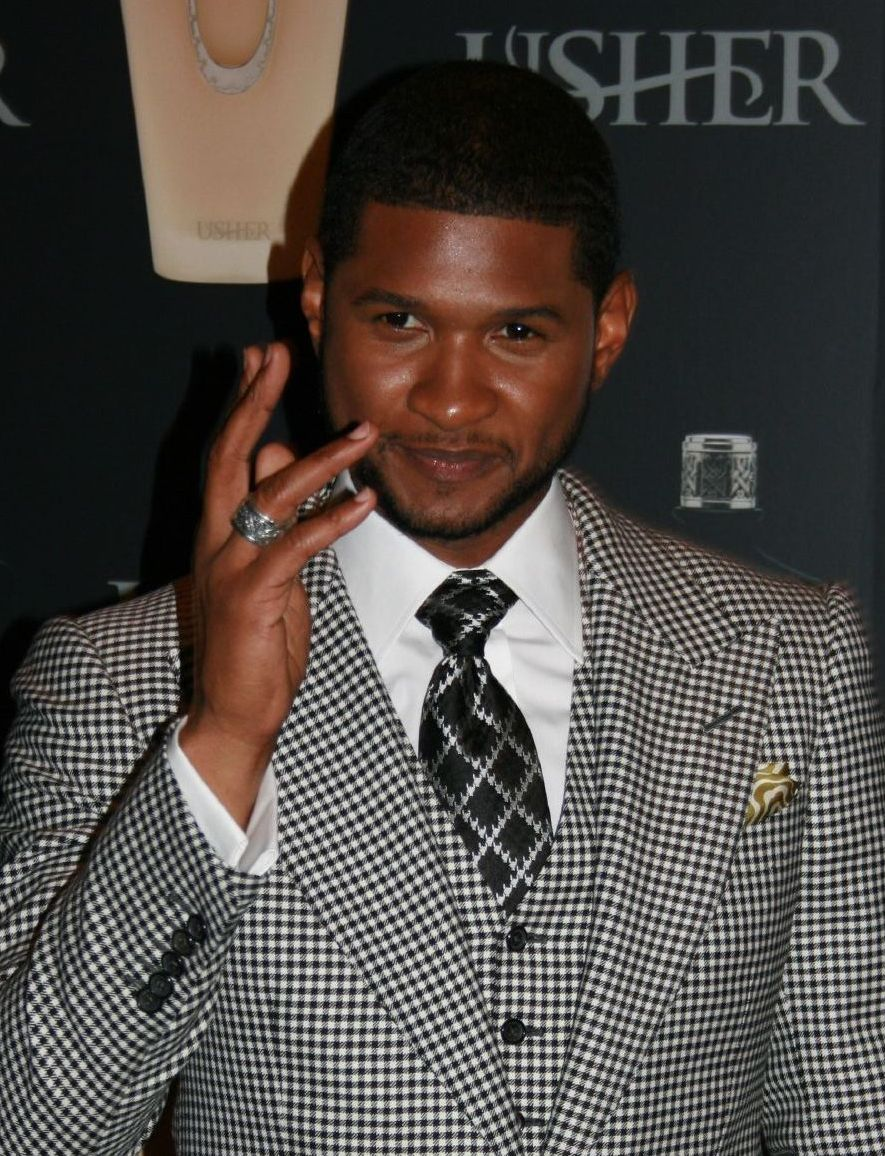
Usher

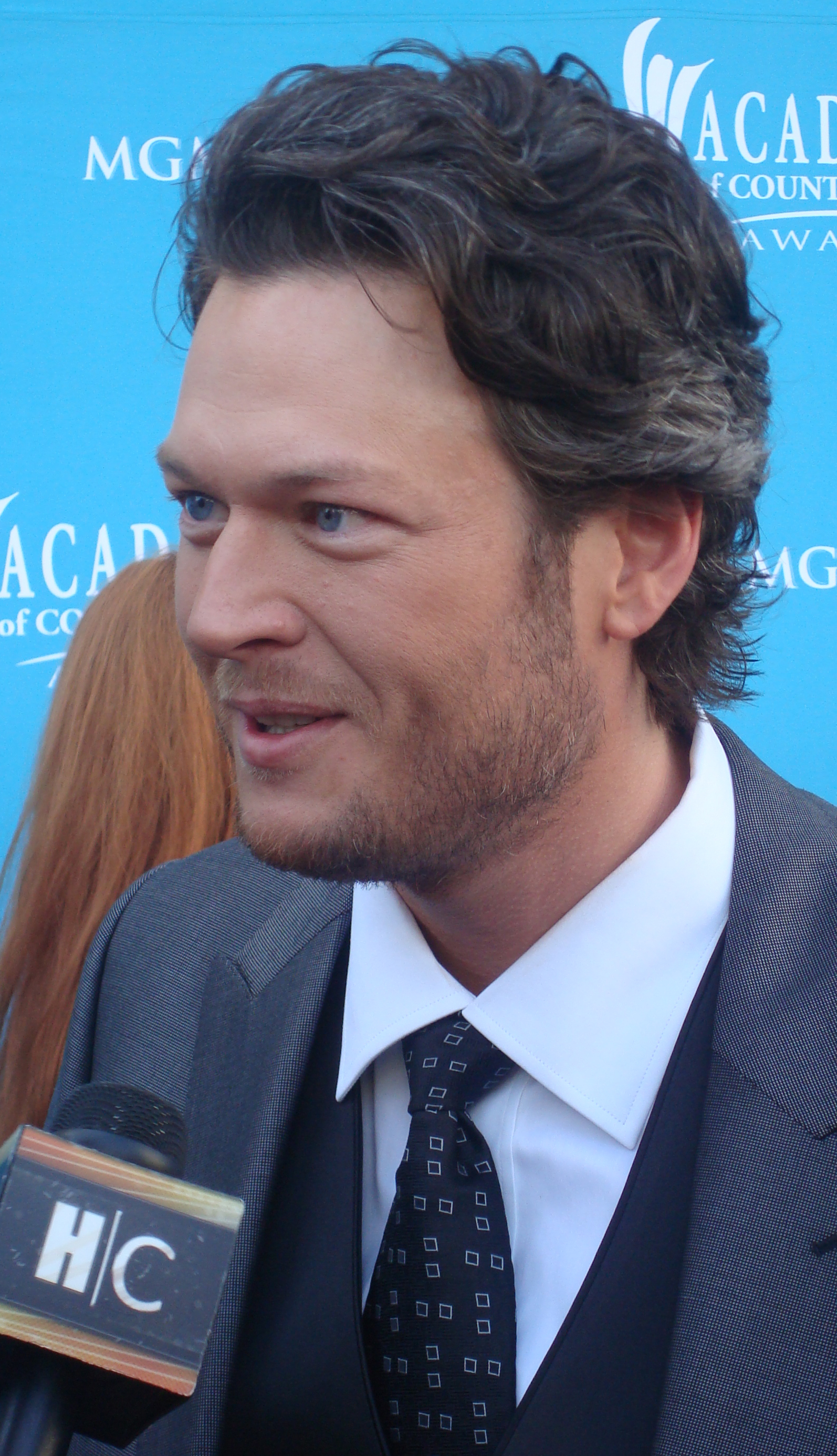
Blake Shelton

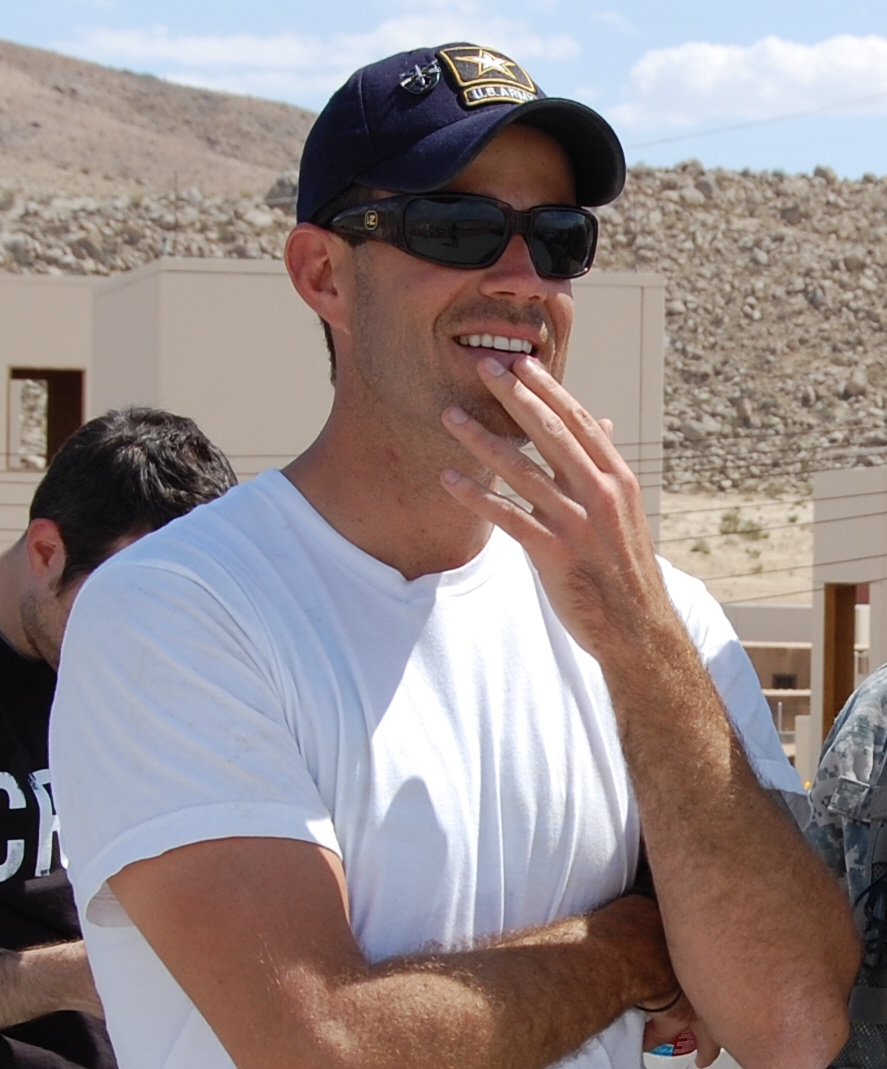
Carson Daly (Host)

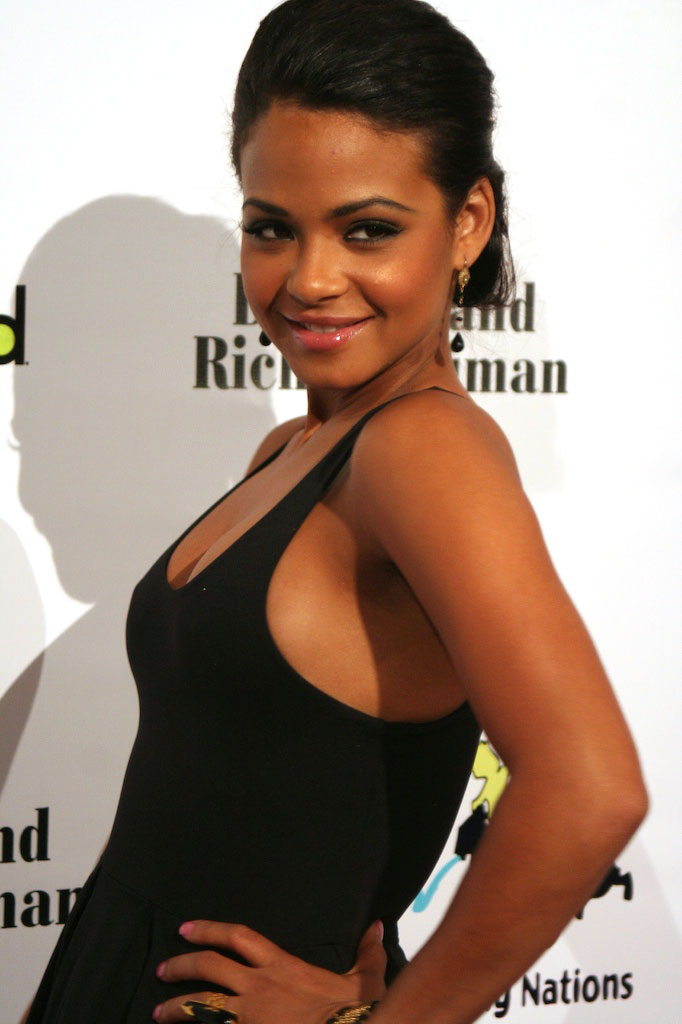
Christina Milian (Backstage)

This season's advisers for the Battle Rounds were Hillary Scott (lead singer of Lady Antebellum), Sheryl Crow, Pharrell Williams, and Joel Madden (lead singer of Good Charlotte and coach on Australian version) as advisers of Levine, Shelton, Usher, and Shakira's teams respectively. All advisers except Madden returned to coach on their respective teams during week three of the live shows, so Shakira brought in Green to help coach her team.

== Teams ==
Color key

- Winner
- Runner-up
- Third place
- Eliminated in the Live shows
- Eliminated in the Live playoffs
- Eliminated in the Knockout rounds
- Artist stolen by another coach
- Eliminated in the Battle rounds

Coaches	Top 48 artists			
Adam Levine				
Adam Levine	Amber Carrington	Judith Hill	Sarah Simmons	Caroline Glaser
Adam Levine	Orlando Dixon	Midas Whale	Warren Stone	Amy Whitcomb
Adam Levine	~~Karina Iglesias~~	~~Sasha Allen~~	Agina Alvarez	Michael Austin
Adam Levine	Patrick Dodd	Duncan Kamakana		
Shakira				
Shakira	Sasha Allen	Kris Thomas	Garrett Gardner	Karina Iglesias
Shakira	Monique Abbadie	Mary Miranda	Shawna Pierce	Tawnya Reynolds
Shakira	~~Cáthia~~	~~Luke Edgemon~~	~~C. Perkins~~	Mark Andrew
Shakira	J'Sun	Brandon Roush		
Usher				
Usher	Michelle Chamuel	Josiah Hawley	VEDO McCoy	Cáthia
Usher	Ryan Innes	Audrey Karrasch	Jess Kellner	C. Perkins
Usher	~~Taylor Beckham~~	~~Orlando Dixon~~	Jessica Childress	Jeff Lewis
Usher	Chelsea Mohindroo	Jamila Thompson		
Blake Shelton				
Blake Shelton	Danielle Bradbery	The Swon Brothers	Holly Tucker	Justin Rivers
Blake Shelton	Taylor Beckham	Savannah Berry	Grace Askew	Luke Edgemon
Blake Shelton	~~Caroline Glaser~~	Trevor Davis	The Morgan Twins	Christian Porter
Blake Shelton	Michelle Raitzin	Jacqui Sandell		
Note: Italicized names are stolen artists (names struck through within former teams).

== Blind auditions ==
Color key:

✔	Coach hit his/her "I WANT YOU" button
	Artist defaulted to this coach's team
	Artist selected to join this coach's team
	Artist eliminated with no coach pressing his or her "I WANT YOU" button

=== Episode 1 (March 25) ===
The coaches performed a cover of "Come Together" at the start of the show.

Order	Artist	Age	Hometown	Song	Coach's and artist's choices			
Order	Artist	Age	Hometown	Song	Adam	Shakira	Usher	Blake
1	The Morgan Twins	29	Rochester, New York	"Fallin'"	✔	✔	✔	✔
2	Jess Kellner	21	Austin, Texas	"Can't Help Falling in Love"	—	✔	✔	—
3	Mark Andrew	27	Eden Prairie, Minnesota	"Knockin' on Heaven's Door"	✔	✔	—	—
4	Janetza Miranda	25	Newark, New Jersey	"Titanium"	—	—	—	—
5	Danielle Bradbery	16	Cypress, Texas	"Mean"	✔	—	✔	✔
6	VEDO	19	Atlanta, Georgia	"Boyfriend"	—	—	✔	—
7	Christian Porter	20	Stroudsburg, Pennsylvania	"Sexy and I Know It"	—	✔	✔	✔
8	Nicole Serrano	N/A	New York City, New York / Minneapolis, Minnesota	"E.T"	—	—	—	—
9	James Shealy	N/A	Atlanta, Georgia	"Not Over You"	—	—	—	—
10	Hunter Elizabeth	N/A	Boulder, Montana/Los Angeles, California	"Mercy"	—	—	—	—
11	Leah Lewis	15	Shanghai, China /Orlando, Florida	"Blown Away"	—	—	—	—
12	Kris Thomas	27	Memphis, Tennessee	"Saving All My Love for You"	—	✔	—	—
13	James Irwin	30	St. James, Missouri	"The Man Who Can't Be Moved"	—	—	—	—
14	Judith Hill	29	Los Angeles, California	"What a Girl Wants"	✔	✔	✔	✔

=== Episode 2 (March 26) ===
Order	Artist	Age	Hometown	Song	Coach's and artist's choices			
Order	Artist	Age	Hometown	Song	Adam	Shakira	Usher	Blake
1	Tawnya Reynolds	32	Ruidoso, New Mexico/ Nashville, Tennessee	"Mammas Don't Let Your Babies Grow Up to Be Cowboys"	✔	✔	✔	—
2	Josiah Hawley	27	Fort Smith, Arkansas	"Sunday Morning"	✔	—	✔	✔
3	Midas Whale (Jon Peter Lewis & Ryan Hayes)	32 & 26	Rexburg, Idaho	"Folsom Prison Blues"	✔	✔	✔	✔
4	Abraham McDonald	35	Los Angeles, California	"Best Thing I Never Had"	—	—	—	—
5	Cáthia	19	New York City, New York	"No Me Doy por Vencido"	—	✔	✔	✔
6	Sarah Simmons	22	Birmingham, Alabama/ Memphis, Tennessee	"One of Us"	✔	✔	✔	✔

=== Episode 3 (April 1) ===
Order	Artist	Age	Hometown	Song	Coach's and artist's choices			
Order	Artist	Age	Hometown	Song	Adam	Shakira	Usher	Blake
1	The Swon Brothers	24 & 27	Muskogee, Oklahoma	"American Girl"	—	✔	✔	✔
2	Taylor Beckham	17	Dallas, Texas	"I'm Going Down"	—	✔	✔	—
3	Sam Alves	24	Fortaleza, Brazil	"Feeling Good"	—	—	—	—
4	Karina Iglesias	35	Miami, Florida	"I'm the Only One"	✔	—	—	✔
5	Garrett Gardner	17	Ringwood, New Jersey	"Seven Nation Army"	—	✔	—	—
6	J'Sun	26	New York City, New York	"For the First Time"	—	✔	—	—
7	Duncan Kamakana	25	Oahu, Hawaii	"Home"	✔	—	—	—
8	Chelsea M (Chelsea Mohindroo)	20	Springfield, Virginia	"Take a Bow"	—	—	✔	✔
9	Holly Tucker	19	Waco, Texas	"Make You Feel My Love"	✔	✔	✔	✔
10	Sonika Vaid	N/A	Weston, Massachusetts	"Give Your Heart a Break"	—	—	—	—
11	Shane Simon	N/A	West Hollywood, California	"Don't Let the Sun Go Down on Me"	—	—	—	—
12	JoiStarr	N/A	Los Angeles, California	"Wide Awake"	—	—	—	—
13	Landon Medvec	N/A	Rosemount, Minnesota	"You Give Me Something"	—	—	—	—
14	Michelle Chamuel	26	Amherst, Massachusetts	"I Kissed a Girl"	✔	✔	✔	—
15	Julie Roberts	33	Nashville, Tennessee / Lancaster, South Carolina	"God Gave Me You"	—	—	—	—
16	Monique Abbadie	20	Miami, Florida	"Loca"	✔	✔	✔	✔
17	Warren Stone	31	Hannah, South Carolina	"Colder Weather"	✔	✔	—	✔

=== Episode 4 (April 2) ===
Order	Artist	Age	Hometown	Song	Coach's and artist's choices			
Order	Artist	Age	Hometown	Song	Adam	Shakira	Usher	Blake
1	Audrey Karrasch	20	Reno, Nevada	"Price Tag"	—	—	✔	✔
2	Brandon Roush	19	Louisville, Kentucky	"With a Little Help From My Friends"	—	✔	—	—
3	Betsy Barta	22	Minneapolis, Minnesota	"Set Fire to the Rain"	—	—	—	—
4	Jewl Anguay	N/A	Kaneohe, Hawaii	"Battlefield"	—	—	—	—
5	Ginette Claudette	19	New York City, New York	"No One"	—	—	—	—
6	Chris Johnson	26	Memphis, Tennessee	"I Won't Back Down"	—	—	—	—
7	Patrick Dodd	35	Memphis, Tennessee	"Walking in Memphis"	✔	✔	—	—
8	Trevor Davis	32	San Diego, California	"Keep Your Head Up"	—	—	—	✔
9	C. Perkins	19	New Orleans, Louisiana	"Because of You"	—	✔	—	—
10	Agina Alvarez	23	Burbank, California	"Beautiful Liar"	✔	—	—	—
11	Orlando Dixon	24	Washington, D.C.	"So Sick"	—	—	✔	—
12	Savannah Berry	17	Houston, Texas	"Safe & Sound"	✔	✔	—	✔

=== Episode 5 (April 8) ===
Order	Artist	Age	Hometown	Song	Coach's and artist's choices			
Order	Artist	Age	Hometown	Song	Adam	Shakira	Usher	Blake
1	Jeff Lewis	28	Dallas, Texas	"U Got It Bad"	—	✔	✔	✔
2	Shawna P	45	Orange Beach, Alabama	"She Talks to Angels"	✔	✔	—	—
3	Caroline Glaser	18	Chesterfield, Missouri	"Tiny Dancer"	—	✔	—	✔
4	Cameron	24	Wayland, Iowa	"As Long as You Love Me"	—	—	—	—
5	Michael Austin	43	Norco, California	"Somebody Like You"	✔	✔	—	—
6	Sasha Allen	30	New York City, New York	"Not Ready to Make Nice"	✔	✔	✔	✔
7	Matt Cermanski	19	Phoenixville, Pennsylvania	"Teenage Dream"	—	—	—	—
8	Jamila Thompson	21	Atlanta, Georgia	"Halo"	—	—	✔	—
9	Amy Whitcomb	24	Longwood, Florida	"Because of You"	✔	—	—	—
10	Justin Rivers	28	Bowling Green, Kentucky	"Summertime"	—	—	—	✔
11	Michelle Raitzin	20	Great Neck, New York	"Bless the Broken Road"	—	—	—	✔
12	Mary Miranda	17	Havana, Cuba /Albuquerque, New Mexico	"Como La Flor"	—	✔	✔	✔
13	Grace Askew	26	Memphis, Tennessee	"These Boots Are Made for Walkin'"	—	✔	—	✔
14	Jane Smith	18	Cincinnati, Ohio	"You've Got the Love"	—	—	—	—
15	Greylan James	N/A	Knoxville, Tennessee	"Wanted"	—	—	—	—
16	Dakota O'Driscoll	15	Tyngsborough, Massachusetts	"Fifteen"	—	—	—	—
17	Brandon Diaz	16	Ashburn, Virginia	"Fine By Me"	—	—	—	—
18	Ryan Innes	31	Provo, Utah	"Gravity"	✔	✔	✔	✔

=== Episode 6 (April 9) ===
Order	Artist	Age	Hometown	Song	Coach's and artist's choices			
Order	Artist	Age	Hometown	Song	Adam	Shakira	Usher	Blake
1	Mark Lennon	48	Los Angeles, California	"Come Together"	—	—	—	—
2	Jacqui Sandell	24	Oakland, New Jersey	"Dreams"	—	—	✔	✔
3	Amber Carrington	19	Rockwall, Texas	"Good Girl"	✔	—	—	Team full
4	Dustin Hatzenbuhler	24	Apple Valley, Minnesota	"Haven't Met You Yet"	Team full	—	—	Team full
5	Luke Edgemon	24	Fayetteville, North Carolina	"I Can't Make You Love Me"	Team full	✔	✔	Team full
6	Jessica Childress	26	Lancaster, California	"Marry You"	Team full	Team full	✔	Team full

== The Battles ==
The Battle Rounds were broadcast from Monday, April 15, 2013, to Tuesday, April 23, 2013. The 'Steals' (adopted in season 3) have been retained, and each coach has two uses to be used throughout the Battle rounds. Six battles (or the outcomes thereof) were included in each episode of the Battle Rounds. For this season's advisers, Adam Levine has picked Hillary Scott from Lady Antebellum, Blake Shelton has chosen Sheryl Crow, Shakira is assisted by Joel Madden and Usher brought in Pharrell Williams.

Color key:

Artist won the Battle and advances to the Knockouts
Artist lost the Battle but advanced to the Knockouts after being stolen by another coach
Artist lost the Battle and was eliminated

Episode	Coach	Order	Winner	Song	Loser	'Steal' result			
Episode	Coach	Order	Winner	Song	Loser	Adam	Shakira	Usher	Blake
Episode 7 (Monday, April 15, 2013)	Adam Levine	1	Amber Carrington	"Try"	Sasha Allen	—N/a	✔	✔	—
Episode 7 (Monday, April 15, 2013)	Shakira	2	Garrett Gardner	"How You Like Me Now?"	J'Sun	—	—N/a	—	—
Episode 7 (Monday, April 15, 2013)	Blake Shelton	3	Holly Tucker	"Blown Away"	Michelle Raitzin	—	—	—	—N/a
Episode 7 (Monday, April 15, 2013)	Usher	4	Jess Kellner	"You Know I'm No Good"	Taylor Beckham	—	—	—N/a	✔
Episode 7 (Monday, April 15, 2013)	Blake Shelton	5	The Swon Brothers	"I Won't Back Down"	Christian Porter	—	—	—	—N/a
Episode 7 (Monday, April 15, 2013)	Adam Levine	6	Judith Hill	"It's a Man's Man's Man's World"	Karina Iglesias	—N/a	✔	—	—
Episode 8 (Tuesday, April 16, 2013)	Adam Levine	1	Warren Stone	"My Kinda Party"	Michael Austin	—N/a	Team full	—	—
Episode 8 (Tuesday, April 16, 2013)	Usher	2	Josiah Hawley	"Roxanne"	Jeff Lewis	—	Team full	—N/a	—
Episode 8 (Tuesday, April 16, 2013)	Blake Shelton	3	Grace Askew	"Me and Bobby McGee"	Trevor Davis	—	Team full	—	—N/a
Episode 8 (Tuesday, April 16, 2013)	Usher	4	Audrey Karrasch	"If I Were a Boy"	Jamila Thompson	—	Team full	—N/a	—
Episode 8 (Tuesday, April 16, 2013)	Shakira	5	Tawnya Reynolds	"The Chain"	Mark Andrew	—	Team full	—	—
Episode 8 (Tuesday, April 16, 2013)	Blake Shelton	6	Danielle Bradbery	"Put Your Records On"	Caroline Glaser	✔	Team full	✔	—N/a
Episode 9 (Monday, April 22, 2013)	Usher	1	VEDO	"Locked Out of Heaven"	Jessica Childress	—	Team full	—N/a	—
Episode 9 (Monday, April 22, 2013)	Shakira	2	Monique Abbadie	"You and I"	Luke Edgemon	—	Team full	✔	✔
Episode 9 (Monday, April 22, 2013)	Blake Shelton	3	Savannah Berry	"Little White Church"	Jacqui Sandell	—	Team full	—	Team full
Episode 9 (Monday, April 22, 2013)	Shakira	4	Kris Thomas	"It Will Rain"	C. Perkins	—	Team full	✔	Team full
Episode 9 (Monday, April 22, 2013)	Adam Levine	5	Midas Whale	"Burning Love"	Patrick Dodd	—	Team full	—	Team full
Episode 9 (Monday, April 22, 2013)	Usher	6	Ryan Innes	"Ain't No Sunshine"	Orlando Dixon	✔	Team full	—N/a	Team full
Episode 10 (Tuesday, April 23, 2013)	Shakira	1	Shawna P	"Piece of My Heart"	Brandon Roush	Team full	Team full	—	Team full
Episode 10 (Tuesday, April 23, 2013)	Adam Levine	2	Sarah Simmons	"Wanted You More"	Duncan Kamakana	Team full	Team full	—	Team full
Episode 10 (Tuesday, April 23, 2013)	Usher	3	Michelle Chamuel	"Titanium"	Chelsea M	Team full	Team full	—N/a	Team full
Episode 10 (Tuesday, April 23, 2013)	Adam Levine	4	Amy Whitcomb	"Heartbreaker"	Agina Alvarez	Team full	Team full	—	Team full
Episode 10 (Tuesday, April 23, 2013)	Blake Shelton	5	Justin Rivers	"Easy"	The Morgan Twins	Team full	Team full	—	Team full
Episode 10 (Tuesday, April 23, 2013)	Shakira	6	Mary Miranda	"Antes de las Seis"	Cáthia	Team full	Team full	✔	Team full

== The Knockouts ==
The Knockout Rounds aired on Monday, April 29, 2013, and Tuesday, April 30, 2013.

Color key:

Artist won the Knockouts and advances to the Live shows
Artist lost the Knockouts and was eliminated

Episode	Coach	Order	Song	Artists		Song
Episode	Coach	Order	Song	Winner	Loser	Song
Episode 11 (Monday, April 29, 2013)	Adam Levine	1	"I'm with You"	Amber Carrington	Midas Whale	"Higher Ground"
Episode 11 (Monday, April 29, 2013)	Shakira	2	"Too Close"	Garrett Gardner	Tawnya Reynolds	"Hell on Heels"
Episode 11 (Monday, April 29, 2013)	Adam Levine	3	"Little Talks"	Caroline Glaser	Amy Whitcomb	"The House of the Rising Sun"
Episode 11 (Monday, April 29, 2013)	Shakira	4	"What a Wonderful World"	Kris Thomas	Mary Miranda	"Every Breath You Take"
Episode 11 (Monday, April 29, 2013)	Adam Levine	5	"Always on My Mind"	Judith Hill	Orlando Dixon	"All My Life"
Episode 11 (Monday, April 29, 2013)	Shakira	6	"Are You Gonna Go My Way"	Karina Iglesias	Monique Abbadie	"The Power of Love"
Episode 11 (Monday, April 29, 2013)	Adam Levine	7	"Wild Horses"	Sarah Simmons	Warren Stone	"(I Just) Died in Your Arms"
Episode 11 (Monday, April 29, 2013)	Shakira	8	"At Last"	Sasha Allen	Shawna P	"Maybe I'm Amazed"
Episode 12 (Tuesday, April 30, 2013)	Blake Shelton	1	"The Climb"	Justin Rivers	Savannah Berry	"As Long As You Love Me"
Episode 12 (Tuesday, April 30, 2013)	Usher	2	"Back to Black"	Josiah Hawley	Jess Kellner	"You Give Me Something"
Episode 12 (Tuesday, April 30, 2013)	Blake Shelton	3	"Live Like You Were Dying"	Holly Tucker	Luke Edgemon	"Teenage Dream"
Episode 12 (Tuesday, April 30, 2013)	Usher	4	"Raise Your Glass"	Michelle Chamuel	Audrey Karrasch	"How to Love"
Episode 12 (Tuesday, April 30, 2013)	Blake Shelton	5	"Jesus, Take the Wheel"	Danielle Bradbery	Taylor Beckham	"Russian Roulette"
Episode 12 (Tuesday, April 30, 2013)	Usher	6	"(Everything I Do) I Do It for You"	VEDO	C. Perkins	"She Ain't You"
Episode 12 (Tuesday, April 30, 2013)	Blake Shelton	7	"Drift Away"	The Swon Brothers	Grace Askew	"I Can't Stand the Rain"
Episode 12 (Tuesday, April 30, 2013)	Usher	8	"Mr. Know It All"	Cáthia	Ryan Innes	"I Don't Want to Be"

== Live shows ==
Prior to the start of the Live shows, a special episode called "The Road to the Live Shows" was aired for one hour on Wednesday, May 1, 2013, recapping some of the best moments of the blind auditions, battle rounds and knockout rounds.

Color key:

Artist was saved by Public's vote
Artist was saved by his/her coach
Artist's iTunes vote multiplied by 10 after his/her studio version of the song reached iTunes top 10
Artist was eliminated

=== Week 1: Live playoffs (May 6, 7 & 8) ===
The live playoffs aired from Monday, May 6, 2013, through Wednesday, May 8, 2013. Contestants were asked to sing a stripped-down version of a song in order to concentrate on the competition. The Monday performances featured Teams Adam and Usher, while Tuesday's shows featured Teams Blake and Shakira. On Wednesday, the two artists per team will advance by public vote, and a third artist would be saved by the coach. Special guests in the audience included Savannah Guthrie and Al Roker of The Today Show.

Episode	Coach	Order	Artist	Song	Result
Episode 14 (Monday, May 6, 2013)	Adam Levine	1	Amber Carrington	"Stay"	Public's vote
Episode 14 (Monday, May 6, 2013)	Usher	2	Josiah Hawley	"Starlight"	Usher's choice
Episode 14 (Monday, May 6, 2013)	Adam Levine	3	Sarah Simmons	"Angel"	Adam's choice
Episode 14 (Monday, May 6, 2013)	Usher	4	Cáthia	"I Have Nothing"	Eliminated
Episode 14 (Monday, May 6, 2013)	Adam Levine	5	Caroline Glaser	"The A Team"	Eliminated
Episode 14 (Monday, May 6, 2013)	Usher	6	VEDO	"Against All Odds (Take a Look at Me Now)"	Public's vote
Episode 14 (Monday, May 6, 2013)	Usher	7	Michelle Chamuel	"True Colors"	Public's vote
Episode 14 (Monday, May 6, 2013)	Adam Levine	8	Judith Hill	"Feeling Good"	Public's vote
Episode 15 (Tuesday, May 7, 2013)	Shakira	1	Garrett Gardner	"Imagine"	Shakira's choice
Episode 15 (Tuesday, May 7, 2013)	Blake Shelton	2	Holly Tucker	"How Do I Live"	Public's vote
Episode 15 (Tuesday, May 7, 2013)	Shakira	3	Kris Thomas	"When I Was Your Man"	Public's vote
Episode 15 (Tuesday, May 7, 2013)	Blake Shelton	4	The Swon Brothers	"Fishin' in the Dark"	Blake's choice
Episode 15 (Tuesday, May 7, 2013)	Shakira	5	Karina Iglesias	"Let's Stay Together"	Eliminated
Episode 15 (Tuesday, May 7, 2013)	Blake Shelton	6	Justin Rivers	"Meet in the Middle"	Eliminated
Episode 15 (Tuesday, May 7, 2013)	Blake Shelton	7	Danielle Bradbery	"Maybe It Was Memphis"	Public's vote
Episode 15 (Tuesday, May 7, 2013)	Shakira	8	Sasha Allen	"Oh! Darling"	Public's vote

Non-competition performances
Order	Performers	Song
14.1	Team Usher: Cáthia, Josiah Hawley, Michelle Chamuel, VEDO	"Black and Gold"
14.2	Usher and Adam	"Superstition"
14.3	Team Adam: Amber Carrington, Caroline Glaser, Judith Hill, Sarah Simmons	"Shake It Out"
15.1	Team Blake: Justin Rivers, Holly Tucker, The Swon Brothers, Danielle Bradbery	"Boondocks"
15.2	Shakira & Blake	"Need You Now"
15.3	Team Shakira: Garrett Gardner, Karina Iglesias, Kris Thomas, Sasha Allen	"We Are the Champions"
16.1	Team Blake & Team Shakira	"Hall of Fame"
16.2	Rod Stewart (with Garrett Gardner, Josiah Hawley, and Karina Iglesias)	"Finest Woman", "Forever Young"
16.3	CeeLo Green & Juliet Simms	"Only You"
16.4	Team Adam & Team Usher	"Don't You Worry Child"

=== Week 2: Top 12 (May 13 & 14) ===
The Top 12 performed on Monday, May 13, 2013, and received the results on Tuesday, May 14, 2013. Usher brought in his choreographer, Aakomon Jones, to help coach the artists on his team. During the performance episode's second hour, host Carson Daly mentioned on the changes made to the iTunes multiplier bonus (which remained at tenfold if the artist's single peaked at the top 100 during the voting period), where only one download of an artist's eligible song per registered iTunes account during the designated voting window will count as a vote towards that week's results. The change was contemporaneously added to the "Vote Help" section of the show's NBC.com voting page. None of the artists reached the top 10 on iTunes, so no bonuses were awarded this week. He also mentioned that the iTunes bonus is only given to those in the Top 10 at the close of voting (10am EST).

Order	Coach	Artist	Song	Result
1	Usher	VEDO	"Rock with You"	Eliminated
2	Blake Shelton	Holly Tucker	"A Broken Wing"	Public's vote
3	Shakira	Garrett Gardner	"I Want It That Way"	Eliminated
4	Adam Levine	Sarah Simmons	"The Story"	Public's vote
5	Blake Shelton	The Swon Brothers	"Who's Gonna Fill Their Shoes"	Public's vote
6	Shakira	Sasha Allen	"Alone"	Public's vote
7	Usher	Josiah Hawley	"The Man Who Can't Be Moved"	Public's vote
8	Blake Shelton	Danielle Bradbery	"Wasted"	Public's vote
9	Adam Levine	Judith Hill	"You've Got A Friend"	Public's vote
10	Usher	Michelle Chamuel	"Call Your Girlfriend"	Public's vote
11	Shakira	Kris Thomas	"I'll Be There"	Public's vote
12	Adam Levine	Amber Carrington	"I'm Gonna Love You Through It"	Public's vote

Non-competition performances
Order	Performers	Song
18.1	Robin Thicke (feat. T.I. and Pharrell)	"Blurred Lines"
18.2	Blake Shelton & his finalists: Danielle Bradbery, Holly Tucker, The Swon Brothers	"Play Something Country"
18.3	Lady Antebellum	"Goodbye Town"
18.4	Adam Levine and his team (Amber Carrington, Judith Hill and Sarah Simmons)	"Lovesong"

=== Week 3: Top 10 (May 20 & 21) ===
The Top 10 performed for two hours on Monday, May 20, 2013, with results broadcast on Tuesday, May 21, 2013. Advisers from the Battles (Sheryl Crow, Pharrell Williams and Hillary Scott from Lady Antebellum) return to coach on their respective teams. CeeLo Green takes the place of Joel Madden due to Madden's prior commitments to The Voice Australia. The results show featured a performance dedicated to the people who lost their lives from an EF5 tornado in Moore, Oklahoma. Special guests in the audience included Michelle Rodriguez and Vin Diesel from Fast & Furious 6.

This week's iTunes bonus multipliers was awarded to Bradbery.

Order	Coach	Artist	Song	Result
1	Blake Shelton	Holly Tucker	"How Great Thou Art"	Public's vote
2	Adam Levine	Judith Hill	"The Way You Make Me Feel"	Public's vote
3	Blake Shelton	The Swon Brothers	"How Country Feels"	Public's vote
4	Adam Levine	Amber Carrington	"Breakaway"	Public's vote
5	Shakira	Sasha Allen	"Next to Me"	Public's vote
6	Usher	Josiah Hawley	"Clocks"	Eliminated
7	Blake Shelton	Danielle Bradbery	"Heads Carolina, Tails California"	Public's vote
8	Shakira	Kris Thomas	"Adorn"	Eliminated
9	Adam Levine	Sarah Simmons	"Mamma Knows Best"	Public's vote
10	Usher	Michelle Chamuel	"Just Give Me a Reason"	Public's vote

Non-competition performances
Order	Performers	Song
19.1	Maroon 5	"Love Somebody"
20.1	Blake Shelton & Miranda Lambert	"Over You"
20.2	Shakira & her finalists: Sasha Allen & Kris Thomas	"I'll Stand By You"
20.3	Team Blake: Danielle Bradbery, The Swon Brothers, Holly Tucker	"Mountain Music"
20.4	Usher & his finalists: Michelle Chamuel & Josiah Hawley	"The Look of Love"
20.5	Team Adam: Amber Carrington, Judith Hill, Sarah Simmons	"I've Got the Music in Me"

=== Week 4: Top 8 (May 27 & 28) ===
The Top 8 performed on Monday, May 27, 2013, and received the results on Tuesday, May 28. A special preview for the upcoming season of America's Got Talent was shown during the broadcast of the results show.

None of the artists reached the top 10 on iTunes, so no bonuses were awarded; Bradbery's performance single however, did peak at the Top 10 only after the voting window ended, thus the bonus was not applied.

Order	Coach	Artist	Song	Result
1	Adam Levine	Judith Hill	"#thatPOWER"	Eliminated
2	Blake Shelton	Holly Tucker	"Done"	Public's vote
3	Blake Shelton	The Swon Brothers	"Seven Bridges Road"	Public's vote
4	Shakira	Sasha Allen	"Without You"	Public's vote
5	Adam Levine	Sarah Simmons	"Somebody That I Used to Know"	Eliminated
6	Usher	Michelle Chamuel	"Grenade"	Public's vote
7	Blake Shelton	Danielle Bradbery	"Grandpa (Tell Me 'Bout the Good Ol' Days)"	Public's vote
8	Adam Levine	Amber Carrington	"Skyfall"	Public's vote

Non-competition performances
Order	Performers	Song
21.1	Blake Shelton (featuring Gwen Sebastian)	"Boys 'Round Here"
21.2	Judith Hill, Michelle Chamuel, Sarah Simmons, and Sasha Allen	"Diamonds"
21.3	Amber Carrington, Danielle Bradbery, Holly Tucker, and The Swon Brothers	"Something More"
22.1	Sheryl Crow (with The Swon Brothers, Holly Tucker and Danielle Bradbery)	"Easy"
22.2	Judith Hill & Michelle Chamuel	"Sweet Nothing"
22.3	Sasha Allen & The Swon Brothers	"Don't You Wanna Stay"
22.4	Danielle Bradbery & Sarah Simmons	"A Thousand Years"
22.5	Amber Carrington & Holly Tucker	"Does He Love You"

=== Week 5: Quarterfinals (June 3 & 4) ===
Top 6 performed two songs each on Monday, June 3, 2013, and received the results on Tuesday, June 4, 2013. Each contestant sang two songs, one of their choice, and one of the coach's choice. Only one contestant was eliminated this week instead of the usual two. Taylor Swift attended Michelle Chamuel's rehearsal for "I Knew You Were Trouble". Amber Carrington had forgotten the lyrics to "I Remember You" during her performance, though it was not commented on by any of the coaches.

The iTunes bonus multipliers was awarded for Chamuel.

Coach	Artist	Order	Song (Coach's choice)	Order	Song (Artist's choice)	Result
Blake Shelton	Holly Tucker	1	"When God-Fearin' Women Get the Blues"	8	"My Wish"	Eliminated
Usher	Michelle Chamuel	2	"Somewhere Only We Know"	9	"I Knew You Were Trouble"	Public's vote
Blake Shelton	The Swon Brothers	7	"Okie from Muskogee"	3	"Wagon Wheel"	Public's vote
Shakira	Sasha Allen	12	"Before He Cheats"	4	"Ain't No Way"	Public's vote
Blake Shelton	Danielle Bradbery	5	"Shake the Sugar Tree"	11	"A Little Bit Stronger"	Public's vote
Adam Levine	Amber Carrington	6	"I Remember You"	10	"Crazy"	Public's vote

Non-competition performances
Order	Performers	Song
24.1	Cassadee Pope	"Wasting All These Tears"
24.2	Michelle Chamuel & Sasha Allen	"Open Your Heart"
24.3	Holly Tucker & The Swon Brothers	"Leave the Pieces"
24.4	Amber Carrington & Danielle Bradbery	"Eternal Flame"

=== Week 6: Semifinals (June 10 & 11) ===
The Top 5 performed two songs each on Monday, June 10, 2013, and received the results on Tuesday, June 11, 2013. One song is chosen by their coach, and the other is chosen by the contestant as a dedication to another (The Swon Brothers dedicated their band members past and present, Allen for her children, Carrington for her best friends, Bradbery for her parents and best friend, and Chamuel for her coach, Usher)

With the eliminations of Allen and Carrington, Levine and Shakira no longer have any remaining artists on their teams, with the latter being the first contestant to reach the Top 10 of iTunes and to be eliminated in the same week, and also the first time a pair of contestants who pitted together in a Battle round eliminated on the same week. It also marked the first time that a new coach has coached an artist competing in the finale on his first attempt, as Usher had Chamuel available on his team.

Coach	Artist	Order	Song (Artist's choice)	Order	Song (Coach's choice)	Result
Blake Shelton	The Swon Brothers	1	"Turn the Page"	6	"Danny's Song"	Public's vote
Shakira	Sasha Allen	2	"I Will Always Love You"	7	"Bad Girls"	Eliminated
Usher	Michelle Chamuel	10	"Time After Time"	3	"Clarity"	Public's vote
Blake Shelton	Danielle Bradbery	8	"Who I Am"	4	"Please Remember Me"	Public's vote
Adam Levine	Amber Carrington	5	"Firework"	9	"Sad"	Eliminated

Non-competition performances
Order	Performers	Song
25.1	Usher	"Twisted"
26.1	Fall Out Boy (with Michelle Chamuel)	"My Songs Know What You Did in the Dark"
26.2	Nicholas David	"Say Goodbye"
26.3	Tony Lucca	"Never Going to Let You Go"
26.4	Top 5 finalists	"Every Rose Has Its Thorn"
26.5	Terry McDermott	"Pictures"

=== Week 7: Finale (June 17 & 18) ===
The Top 3 performed on Monday, June 17, 2013, with the announcement of the winner on Tuesday, June 18, 2013. This week, the contestants performed three times: a "defining moment" from a rewind performance, a duet with their coach, and a solo.

Six performances reached top 10 on iTunes as follows Danielle Bradbery (#2 & #9), Michelle Chamuel (#3 & #8) and The Swon Brothers (#4 & #7).

Coach	Artist	Order	Reprise song	Order	Duet song (with Coach)	Order	Solo song	Result
Blake Shelton	The Swon Brothers	4	"Danny's Song"	6	"Celebrity"	1	"I Can't Tell You Why"	Third Place
Usher	Michelle Chamuel	2	"I Knew You Were Trouble"	8	"One"	5	"Why"	Runner-up
Blake Shelton	Danielle Bradbery	7	"Maybe It Was Memphis"	3	"Timber, I'm Falling in Love"	9	"Born to Fly"	Winner

Non-competition performances
Order	Performers	Song
27.1	Adam Levine, Blake Shelton, Shakira, and Usher	"With a Little Help from My Friends"
27.2	Danielle Bradbery, Michelle Chamuel, and The Swon Brothers (with remaining Top 16 finalists)	"Home"
28.1	Pitbull ft. Christina Aguilera	"Feel This Moment"
28.2	The Swon Brothers (with Amber Carrington, Holly Tucker and Justin Rivers)	"Stars Tonight"
28.3	Michelle Chamuel and OneRepublic	"Counting Stars"
28.4	Florida Georgia Line ft. Nelly	"Cruise"
28.5	Josiah Hawley, Kris Thomas, VEDO and Garrett Gardner (with Holly Tucker on the saxophone)	"Ain't Too Proud To Beg"
28.6	Danielle Bradbery (with Amber Carrington, Sarah Simmons, Caroline Glaser)	"All American Girl"
28.7	Bruno Mars	"Treasure"
28.8	The Swon Brothers and Bob Seger	"Night Moves"
28.9	Karina Iglesias, Cáthia, Sasha Allen and Judith Hill	"My Lovin' (You're Never Gonna Get It)"
28.10	Danielle Bradbery and Hunter Hayes	"I Want Crazy"
28.11	Michelle Chamuel (with Josiah Hawley, VEDO and Cáthia)	"We Can Work It Out"
28.12	Cher	"Woman's World"
28.13	Danielle Bradbery (winner)	"Born to Fly"

== Elimination chart ==
=== Overall ===
Color key
Artist's info

- Artist from Team Adam
- Artist from Team Shakira
- Artist from Team Usher
- Artist from Team Blake

Result details

- Winner
- Runner-up
- Third place
- Artist was saved by his/her coach
- Artist was saved by the public
- Artist was eliminated

Live show results per week
Artist	Week 1 Playoffs	Week 2	Week 3	Week 4	Week 5	Week 6	Week 7 Finale
Danielle Bradbery	Safe	Safe	Safe	Safe	Safe	Safe	Winner
Michelle Chamuel	Safe	Safe	Safe	Safe	Safe	Safe	Runner-up
The Swon Brothers	Safe	Safe	Safe	Safe	Safe	Safe	3rd place
Sasha Allen	Safe	Safe	Safe	Safe	Safe	Eliminated	Eliminated (Week 6)
Amber Carrington	Safe	Safe	Safe	Safe	Safe	Eliminated	Eliminated (Week 6)
Holly Tucker	Safe	Safe	Safe	Safe	Eliminated	Eliminated (Week 5)	
Judith Hill	Safe	Safe	Safe	Eliminated	Eliminated (Week 4)		
Sarah Simmons	Safe	Safe	Safe	Eliminated	Eliminated (Week 4)		
Josiah Hawley	Safe	Safe	Eliminated	Eliminated (Week 3)			
Kris Thomas	Safe	Safe	Eliminated	Eliminated (Week 3)			
Garrett Gardner	Safe	Eliminated	Eliminated (Week 2)				
VEDO	Safe	Eliminated	Eliminated (Week 2)				
Caroline Glaser	Eliminated	Eliminated (Week 1)					
Justin Rivers	Eliminated	Eliminated (Week 1)					
Karina Iglesias	Eliminated	Eliminated (Week 1)					
Cáthia	Eliminated	Eliminated (Week 1)					

=== Team ===
Color key:

Artist's info

- Artist from Team Adam
- Artist from Team Shakira
- Artist from Team Usher
- Artist from Team Blake

Result details

- Winner
- Runner-up
- Third place
- Eliminated
- Artist received one or more iTunes bonus that week (applicable from week 2 onwards)
- Number of iTunes bonuses received
- Teams are in 3 artists
- No artists remaining on his/her team

Artist	Week 1 Playoffs	Week 2	Week 3	Week 4	Week 5	Week 6	Week 7 Finale
Amber Carrington	Public's choice	Advanced	Advanced	Advanced	Advanced	Eliminated	
Judith Hill	Public's choice	Advanced	Advanced	Eliminated			
Sarah Simmons	Coach's choice	Advanced	Advanced	Eliminated			
Caroline Glaser	Eliminated						
Sasha Allen	Public's choice	Advanced	Advanced	Advanced	Advanced	Eliminated	
Kris Thomas	Public's choice	Advanced	Eliminated				
Garrett Gardner	Coach's choice	Eliminated					
Karina Iglesias	Eliminated						
Michelle Chamuel	Public's choice	Advanced	Advanced	Advanced	Advanced	Advanced	Runner-up
Josiah Hawley	Coach's choice	Advanced	Eliminated				
VEDO	Public's choice	Eliminated					
Cáthia	Eliminated						
Danielle Bradbery	Public's choice	Advanced	Advanced	Advanced	Advanced	Advanced	Winner
The Swon Brothers	Coach's choice	Advanced	Advanced	Advanced	Advanced	Advanced	Third Place
Holly Tucker	Public's choice	Advanced	Advanced	Advanced	Eliminated		
Justin Rivers	Eliminated						

Rank	Coach	Top 12	Top 10	Top 8	Top 6	Top 5	Top 3
1	Blake Shelton	3	3	3	3	2	2
2	Usher	3	2	1	1	1	1
3	Adam Levine	3	3	3	1	1	0
4	Shakira	3	2	1	1	1	0

== Non-artist performances ==
Episode	Show segment	Performer(s)	Title	Hot 100 reaction	Hot Digital Songs reaction	Performance type
16	Live playoff results	Rod Stewart	"Finest Woman"	Did not chart	Did not chart	Live performance
16	Live playoff results	Rod Stewart (with Garrett Gardner, Josiah Hawley, and Karina Iglesias)	"Forever Young"	Did not chart	Did not chart	Live performance
16	Live playoff results	Cee Lo Green ft. Juliet Simms	"Only You"	Did not chart	Did not chart	Live performance
18	Top 12 results	Robin Thicke ft. T.I. and Pharrell (backed by Kris Thomas and VEDO)	"Blurred Lines"	12 (+42)	2 (+21)	Live performance
18	Top 12 results	Lady Antebellum (with Judith Hill, Sarah Simmons and Amber Carrington)	"Goodbye Town"	Did not chart	Did not chart	Live performance
19	Top 10 perform live	Maroon 5	"Love Somebody"	54 (debut)	27 (debut)	live performance & music video teaser
21	Top 8 perform live	Blake Shelton ft. Gwen Sebastian	"Boys 'Round Here"	13 (+3)	9 (+2)	Live performance
22	Top 8 results	Sheryl Crow (with Danielle Bradbery, Holly Tucker and The Swon Brothers)	"Easy"	106 (+19)	Did not chart	Live performance
24	Top 6 results	Cassadee Pope	"Wasting All These Tears"	37 (debut)	10 (debut)	Live performance
25	Live Semifinal performances	Usher	"Twisted"	Did not chart	Did not chart	Live performance
26	Semifinals, live results	Fall Out Boy (with Michelle Chamuel)	"My Songs Know What You Did in the Dark (Light Em Up)"	13 (+6)	10 (+8)	Live performance
26	Semifinals, live results	Nicholas David	"Say Goodbye"	Did not chart	Did not chart	Live performance
26	Semifinals, live results	Tony Lucca	"Never Going to Let You Go"	Did not chart	Did not chart	Live performance
26	Semifinals, live results	Terry McDermott	"Pictures"	Did not chart	Did not chart	Live performance
28	Finals, live results	Pitbull ft. Christina Aguilera	"Feel This Moment"	31 (+3)	32 (+21)	Live performance
28	Finals, live results	OneRepublic (with Michelle Chamuel)	"Counting Stars"	32 (debut)	11 (re-entry)	Live performance (duet)
28	Finals, live results	Florida Georgia Line ft. Nelly	"Cruise"	4 (+2)	2 (+1)	Live performance
28	Finals, live results	Bruno Mars	"Treasure"	8 (+3)	5 (+7)	pre-recorded performance
28	Finals, live results	Bob Seger (with The Swon Brothers)	"Night Moves"	Did not chart	Did not chart	Live performance (duet)
28	Finals, live results	Hunter Hayes (with Danielle Bradbery)	"I Want Crazy"	19 (+12)	12 (+17)	Live performance (duet)
28	Finals, live results	Cher	"Woman's World"	125 (debut)	Did not chart	Live performance

== Ratings ==
Season four premiered on March 25, 2013, and was watched by 13.64 million viewers with a 4.8 rating in the 18–49 demographic. It was up from the previous season's premiere by 1.36 million viewers (11%).

#	Episode	Original airdate	Production	Timeslot (ET)	Viewers (millions)	Rating/Share (adults 18–49)
1	"The Blind Auditions Premiere, Part 1"	March 25, 2013	401	Monday 8:00 pm	13.64	4.8/13
2	"The Blind Auditions Premiere, Part 2"	March 26, 2013	402	Tuesday 8:00 pm	12.41	4.1/12
3	"The Blind Auditions, Part 3"	April 1, 2013	403	Monday 8:00 pm	13.31	4.7/13
4	"The Blind Auditions, Part 4"	April 2, 2013	404	Tuesday 8:00 pm	13.93	4.5/14
5	"The Blind Auditions, Part 5"	April 8, 2013	405	Monday 8:00 pm	14.03	5.0/14
6	"The Blind Auditions, Part 6"	April 9, 2013	406	Tuesday 8:00 pm	13.31	4.4/13
7	"The Battles Premiere, Part 1"	April 15, 2013	407	Monday 8:00 pm	14.45	5.2/14
8	"The Battles Premiere, Part 2"	April 16, 2013	408	Tuesday 8:00 pm	14.16	4.6/15
9	"The Battles, Part 3"	April 22, 2013	409	Monday 8:00 pm	14.15	4.9/13
10	"The Battles, Part 4"	April 23, 2013	410	Tuesday 8:00 pm	12.78	4.1/12
11	"The Knockouts Premiere, Part 1"	April 29, 2013	411	Monday 8:00 pm	12.67	4.3/12
12	"The Knockouts, Part 2"	April 30, 2013	412	Tuesday 8:00 pm	11.84	3.9/11
13	"The Road to the Live Shows"	May 1, 2013	413	Wednesday 8:00 pm	5.75	1.7/5
14	"Live Playoffs, Part 1"	May 6, 2013	414	Monday 8:00 pm	12.15	4.1/11
15	"Live Playoffs, Part 2"	May 7, 2013	415	Tuesday 8:00 pm	11.35	3.7/11
16	"Live Playoffs, Results"	May 8, 2013	416	Wednesday 8:00 pm	8.92	2.8/8
17	"Live Top 12 Performance"	May 13, 2013	417	Monday 8:00 pm	11.29	3.8/10
18	"Recap: Live Top 12 Performance"	May 14, 2013	N/A	Tuesday 8:00 pm	6.68	2.0/6
19	"Live Top 12 Results"	May 14, 2013	418	Tuesday 9:00 pm	10.47	3.5/10
20	"Live Top 10 Performance"	May 20, 2013	419	Monday 8:00 pm	10.81	3.5/10
21	"Live Top 10 Results"	May 21, 2013	420	Tuesday 9:00 pm	10.18	3.2/9
22	"Live Top 8 Performance"	May 27, 2013	421	Monday 8:00 pm	11.00	3.2/9
23	"Recap: Live Top 8 Performance"	May 28, 2013	N/A	Tuesday 8:00 pm	6.38	1.7/5
24	"Live Top 8 Results"	May 28, 2013	422	Tuesday 9:00 pm	10.81	3.2/8
25	"Live Top 6 Performance"	June 3, 2013	423	Monday 8:00 pm	11.29	3.3/9
26	"Live Top 6 Results"	June 4, 2013	424	Tuesday 9:00 pm	10.87	3.1/11
27	"Live Top 5 Semi-finals Performance"	June 10, 2013	425	Monday 8:00 pm	11.85	3.3/10
28	"Live Top 5 Semi-finals Results"	June 11, 2013	426	Tuesday 9:00 pm	10.66	2.9/10
29	"Live Finale Performance"	June 17, 2013	427	Monday 8:00 pm	12.68	3.7/11
30	"Live Finale Results"	June 18, 2013	428	Tuesday 9:00 pm	15.59	4.4/12

== Controversies ==
=== Voting controversy ===
At the beginning of the results show for The Live Playoffs, Carson Daly announced that "inconsistencies" were found in the voting, so votes cast via text messaging and online would be excluded from the vote count to ensure fairness. Daly brought Jason George, CEO of Telescope, the company that manages the show's voting system, on stage to stress that the exclusion would not have affected the results either way. Reported issues were that voting had closed on the Facebook app and website at 11.30 pm PST (an hour and a half after the show's West Coast airing) when it should have ended at 10 am EST the next day, which may have been a result of too many users voting at the same time.

=== Adam Levine comment ===
Upon seeing that his team members, Judith Hill and Sarah Simmons, were not selected, coach Adam Levine said, "I hate this country," right before the top 8 results were announced. This subsequently led to accusations against him on his Twitter page. He then sent a series of Tweets with dictionary definitions of the words "joke," "humorless," "lighthearted," and "misunderstand" to state that it was merely a "heat of the moment" reaction. Levine later provided an explanation: "Last night’s elimination of Judith and Sarah was confusing and downright emotional for me, and my comments were made based on my personal dissatisfaction with the results."

== Artists' appearances in other media ==
- Garrett Gardner and Agina Alvarez sang in the blind auditions of season three of The Voice and failed to make a team.
- Rhian and Cara Morgan of The Morgan Twins, Colton Swon of The Swon Brothers, Luke Edgemon, and Agina Alvarez made it to Hollywood Week on American Idol seasons two, seven, nine, and eleven respectively.
- Jon Peter Lewis of Midas Whale finished in eighth place in season three of American Idol.
- Amy Whitcomb performed in season one of The Sing-Off as a member of BYU Noteworthy, and again in season three as a member of Delilah. They came in sixth place both seasons.
- Sasha Allen was a contestant on VH1's Born to Diva.
- Mary Miranda was on Estrella TV's Tengo Talento, Mucho Talento.
- After failing to make a team, Sam Alves became a contestant on season two of The Voice Brasil. This time, Alves was able to turn all four chairs. He went all the way to the end, winning the competition on December 26, 2013.
- Agina Alvarez went on to compete on the fourth season of La Voz... México, where she came in third place. She also appeared on I Can See Your Voice as La Voz.
- Mark Andrew auditioned for season 14 of American Idol. He was eliminated in the Top 16.
- After failing to make a team, Sonika Vaid auditioned for season fifteen of American Idol. She finished fifth place.
- Duncan Kamakana would participate in EMA 2017 in Slovenia for the chance to represent Slovenia in the Eurovision Song Contest 2017 in Kyiv, Ukraine. He failed to qualify for the national final.
- After failing to make a team, Brandon Diaz auditioned for season sixteen of American Idol. He made it to the Top 24. He also made an appearance in Season 14 to support his girlfriend, Jackie Foster, in the playoffs.
- Ryan Innes would later appear on the second season of Songland.
- Julie Roberts appeared in a game show Wheel of Fortune aired February 13, 2007 playing for her charity along with a contestant Peter Buccellato. Roberts won the $100,000 top prize during the bonus round, raising a total of $124,250 cash & prizes.
