= Gochez =

Gochez or Góchez is a surname. Notable people with the surname include:

- Ernesto Góchez (born 1976), Salvadoran footballer
- Thalia Gochez (born 1994), American photographer
