= Kris Thomas =

American singer (born 1984)

- Born: 17 December 1984 (age 41); Memphis, Tennessee
- Genres: R&B/Soul
- Occupation: Singer
- Instrument: Vocals
- Years active: 2013–present
- Website: kristhomasmusik.com

Kris Thomas (born December 17, 1984) is an American singer. He competed in Season 4 of The Voice, earning a spot on Team Shakira and reaching the Top 10. His self-titled debut EP was released on December 17, 2013.

== Early life ==
Kris Thomas was born in Memphis, Tennessee. He began performing publicly at the age of 14 with his church choir.

He joined the Young Actors Guild, where he gained experience in stage performance and experimented in acting. The following year Thomas joined the Stax Music Academy, where he became a member and lead vocalist of StreetCorner Harmonie. Thomas later featured the Stax students in the music video "Two Kings", in which he joined Pam Tillis.

While obtaining his college degree from Middle Tennessee State University Thomas performed in various talent showcases. Thomas’ R&B cover of "I Know You Won't" by Carrie Underwood landed him a deal with Universal Republic Records.

== Career ==
=== The Voice ===
At the blind auditions on March 25, 2013, Thomas performed Whitney Houston's "Saving All My Love for You", prompting Shakira to turn her chair. At the Battle rounds, Thomas faced C. Perkins where they sang the song "It Will Rain". During the Knockouts, Thomas sang "What a Wonderful World" against Mary Miranda.

During the Live Playoffs, Thomas sang "When I Was Your Man" and "I'll Be There". Thomas' final run was during Week Three of the playoffs, where he sang "Adorn".

=== 2013: Kris Thomas EP ===
On December 17, 2013, Kris Thomas released his first self-titled EP. The first single off of this EP was "Count Me In".

==== EP Track listing ====
- Count Me In
- Long Goodbye
- Back into Your Heart
- My Symphony
- Right To Be Gone

== Concerts ==
Friends Forever Charity Concert Live In Kuala Lumpur

== Discography ==
=== Releases from The Voice ===
- When I Was Your Man
- I'll Be There
- Saving All My Love For You
- Adorn
- It Will Rain
- What a Wonderful World

=== Singles ===
- I Know You Won't
- Balloons
- Two Kings
