= Buying Beverly Hills =

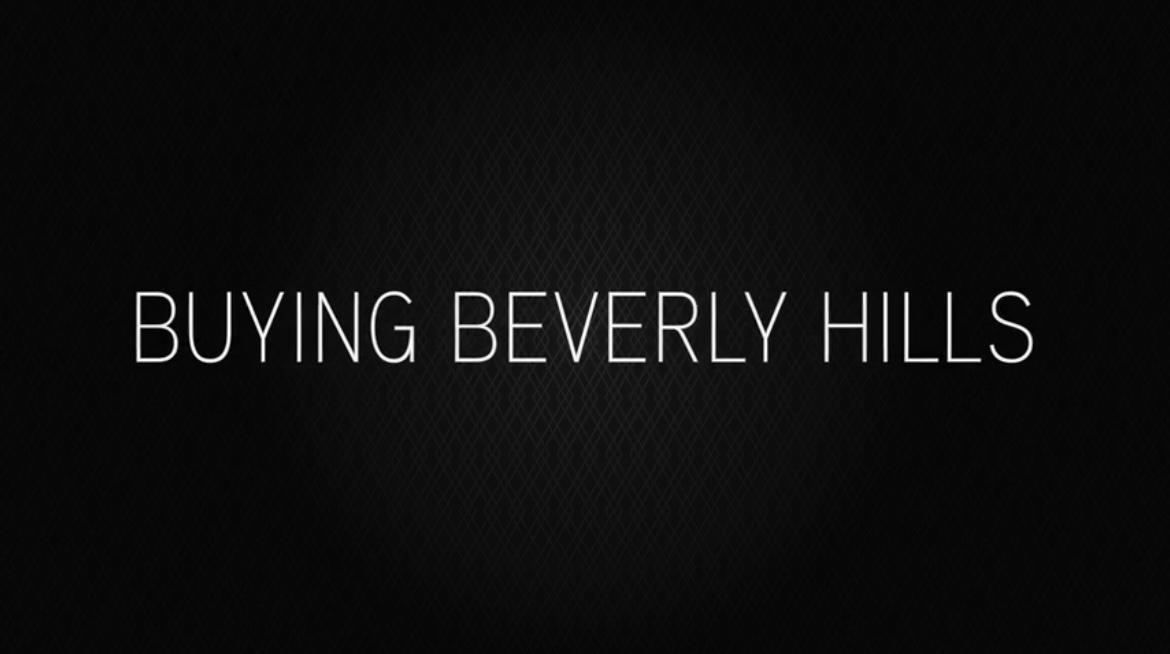
- Genre: Reality television
- Starring: Mauricio Umansky; Farrah Brittany; Alexia Umansky; Sophia Umansky; Sonika Vaid; Santiago Arana; Ben Belack; Joey Ben-Zvi; Jon Grauman; Brandon Graves; Allie Lutz Rosenberger; Melissa Platt
- Country of origin: United States
- Original language: English
- No. of seasons: 2
- No. of episodes: 18

Production
- Executive producers: Brent Montgomery; Justin W. Hochberg; Adam Sher; Michael Call; Steven Drieu; Deanna Markoff; Sara Chamberlain
- Production locations: Beverly Hills, California; Southern California
- Editors: Mac Caudill; Dan Zimmerman; John Longino; Aleks Dankers; Ben States; Jack Alvino
- Running time: 33–51 minutes
- Production companies: ITV America; Just Entertainment; Wheelhouse Entertainment; Spoke Studios

Original release
- Network: Netflix
- Release: November 4, 2022 – March 22, 2024

Buying Beverly Hills is an American television series on Netflix. The first season premiered in 2022. The unscripted series focuses on Mauricio Umansky and his staff at The Agency RE. In August 2024, it was confirmed that the series was canceled after two seasons.

== Overview ==
=== Season 1 ===
The official trailer for the debut season was released on October 7, 2022. Season one was released on Netflix on November 4, 2022. The original cast consisted of Mauricio Umansky, Farrah Brittany, Alexia Umansky, Sonika Vaid, Santiago Arana, Ben Belack, Joey Ben-Zvi, Jon Grauman, Brandon Graves, Allie Lutz Rosenberger, and Melissa Platt.

=== Season 2 ===
On April 10, 2023, it was announced that the series had been renewed for a second season. The second season wrapped filming on July 15. Agents Zach Goldsmith, Michelle Schwartz, and Umansky's daughter Sophia Umansky were added to the main cast. They also cover the day the news broke of Mauricio Umansky and Kyle Richards split, and the aftermath with the family.

== Cast ==
- Mauricio Umansky, founder and owner
- Farrah Brittany, senior agent and Mauricio's stepdaughter
- Alexia Umansky, junior agent, and Mauricio's daughter
- Sonika Vaid, junior agent, Grauman team
- Santiago Arana, senior agent
- Ben Belack, senior agent
- Joey Ben-Zvi, junior agent, Umansky team
- Jon Grauman, senior agent
- Brandon Graves, junior agent, Grauman team
- Allie Lutz Rosenberger, senior agent
- Melissa Platt, senior agent
- Adam Rosenfield, Principal, Grauman Rosenfeld Group (season 2; recurring, season 1)
- Kyle Richards, Mauricio's ex-wife (guest, season 1; recurring, season 2)
- Sophia Umansky, prospective agent on the Umansky team and Mauricio's daughter (season 2)
- Zach Goldsmith, Director, Estate Division (season 2)
- Michelle Schwartz, Managing Partner, Sherman Oaks, Studio City & Calabasas (season 2)

== Episodes ==
=== Series overview ===
Series overview
Season	Episodes	Originally released
1	8	November 4, 2022
2	10	March 22, 2024

=== Season 1 (2022) ===
No. overall	No. in season	Title	Original release date
1	1	"Family Dynasty"	November 4, 2022
Alexia steps up to sell the family home but fails to impress Allie when she bungles a showing; Joey apprentices with veteran agent Ben.
2	2	"Friend or Foe"	November 4, 2022
Brandon and Sonika can't close the deal at a practise open house; Alexia stumbles through another showing, which draws a harsh evaluation from Melissa.
3	3	"Flames and Games"	November 4, 2022
Joey struggles to land his aunt's gem of a listing, causing Mauricio to step in; Alexia confronts Melissa about feeling betrayed.
4	4	"Best Offers"	November 4, 2022
Before an open house, Jon gives Brandon a pep talk about having confidence; Farrah finds the courage to talk to her partner about their future.
5	5	"Farrahween"	November 4, 2022
At an over-the-top Halloween party, Sonika confronts her boyfriend about his past with another agent; Ben gets a tempting offer from a rival agency.
6	6	"Who's Going With Me?"	November 4, 2022
Brandon admits to Alexia why people at The Agency treat her differently; Sonika and Kevin try to repair their relationship, as do Ben and Joey.
7	7	"Love, Leads, and Loyalty"	November 4, 2022
Alexis throws an influencer-filled open house that impresses her coworkers; Farrah challenges Mauricio on an unfair commission split.
8	8	"The Next CEO"	November 4, 2022
Jon secures The Agency's biggest-ever listing, a house worth US$139 million; Mauricio announces that the family business is about to get a little bigger.

=== Season 2 (2024) ===
No. overall	No. in season	Title	Original release date
9	1	"Everything Changes"	March 22, 2024
Sophia Umansky joins the team, putting a few agents on edge; Mauricio opens up about his struggles with Kyle; Joey undermines Alexia on a $28 million property.
10	2	"Not Everyone's Going to Make It"	March 22, 2024
The Agency represents a Botched doctor's home in a high-stakes auction; Sonika receives some bad news at work; a flashy competitor courts Zach.
11	3	"Roasted and Burned"	March 22, 2024
Brandon confronts Ben over his Instagram snub; Alexia and Sophia use their internet savvy for a $150 thousand-per-month rental; Zach cracks a joke that bombs.
12	4	"Queen of the Valley"	March 22, 2024
An open house for an NBA player gets awkward; Sophia shadows Zach while touring a house rich in Hollywood history; Alexia nervously teams up with Michelle.
13	5	"Umanskys Always Win"	March 22, 2024
The Umanskys' pickleball tournament stirs up drama; the crew heads to Miami for a jaw-dropping listing; Farrah's love life becomes office gossip.
14	6	"Business Suicide"	March 22, 2024
In Miami, Farrah confronts Melissa; back in Los Angeles, Alexia teams up with Tyler as Michelle raises doubts about the Umansky daughters taking over The Agency.
15	7	"No Loyalty"	March 22, 2024
Busy schedules strain Kyle and Mauricio's marriage; Santiago puts Zach on the spot; Farrah, Alexia and Michelle have a showdown at an open house.
16	8	"Breaking News"	March 22, 2024
The Umanskys travel to Aspen, Colo., where news about Kyle and Mauricio rattles the family; in Los Angeles, Ben and Tyler bounce back after the Sierra Mar listing.
17	9	"I Don't Want to Lose You"	March 22, 2024
The agents join the Umanskys in Aspen, Colo.; Zach's loyalty is questioned, and Joey gets called out; Mauricio meets with Michelle to discuss her bold comments.
18	10	"Mergers & Separations"	March 22, 2024
Sonika raises issues with Brandon about Kevin's home; Zach makes a major career decision; Mauricio considers the future of his family and business.
