= Estella Sneider =

Mexican television and radio personality

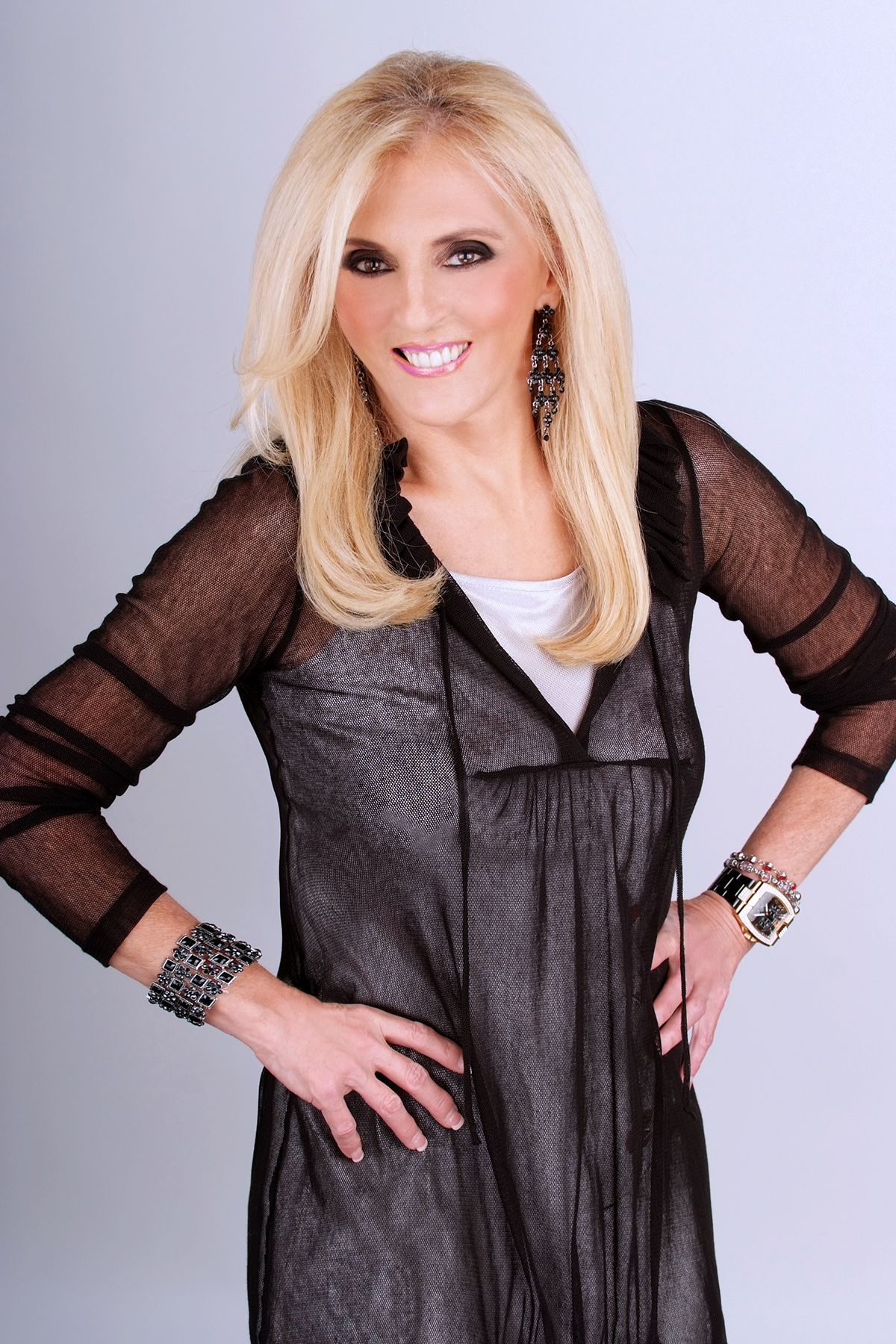
- Born: Estella Sneider Bessudo; September 3, 1950 (age 75); Mexico City, Mexico
- Education: University of Southern California (BS); California Graduate Institute (MA; PsyD)
- Occupation: Psychologist
- Known for: Real Housewives of Beverly Hills
- Political party: Republican
- Spouse: Eduardo Umansky (divorced)
- Children: 2, including Mauricio
- Relatives: Kyle Richards (daughter-in-law)
- Website: drestellasneider.com

Estella Sneider (also known as Dr. Estella, born September 3, 1950) is a Mexican television and radio personality, sex therapist, psychologist, author, and socialite. She is also known for her appearances on the Real Housewives of Beverly Hills with her son Mauricio Umansky and daughter-in-law actress Kyle Richards.

Sneider was nominated for a Shorty Award for her podcasting experience in 2014, a result of her being very active in the entertainment and charity scenes in Los Angeles as well as maintaining an active web presence.

== Biography ==
Sneider was born on September 3, 1950, in Mexico City, Mexico, as the youngest child and only daughter of Simon Sneider and Esther Bessudo Perez. Her four older brothers, two of whom are still living, are Ruben Sneider Bessudo (b. October 31, 1936 - d. January 3, 2009), Luis Sneider Bessudo (b. June 26, 1938 - d. July 26, 2023), Jorge Sneider Bessudo, and Guillermo Sneider Bessudo. She attended Escuela Secundaria y Preparatoria de la Ciudad de Mexico for junior high school, moving to Colegio Hebreo Tarbut for high school. The high school belonged to the Tarbut movement. After getting pregnant, she finished out her high school career at Instituto Superior Abierto.

In 1968, at the age of 18, Sneider married Eduardo Umansky. Together they had two children: Mauricio Simon Umansky and Sharon Umansky. In 1976, the family moved to the United States so that Sneider could pursue higher education. She earned a Bachelor's in Psychology in 1980 from the University of Southern California, followed by a Master's (1984) and then PsyD (1986) in Psychology from the California Graduate Institute. Following her PsyD, Sneider attended the University of California Los Angeles for a year of training in Sexology and Sexual Therapy.

In 1996, her son Mauricio married American actress Kyle Richards as her second husband. Together, the couple have three daughters, namely Alexia Simone, Sophia, and Portia Umansky. Mauricio works as a high end real estate agent, focusing on properties around Beverly Hills and Bel Air, and has a net worth of approximately $30 million. Mauricio's marriage to Kyle was the vehicle for Sneider appearing on RHOBH. Of her relationship with Kyle, Sneider stated, "She is a wonderful wife to my son Mauricio Umansky for 17-plus years, a fabulous mother to my granddaughters and the best daughter-in-law any mother could have."

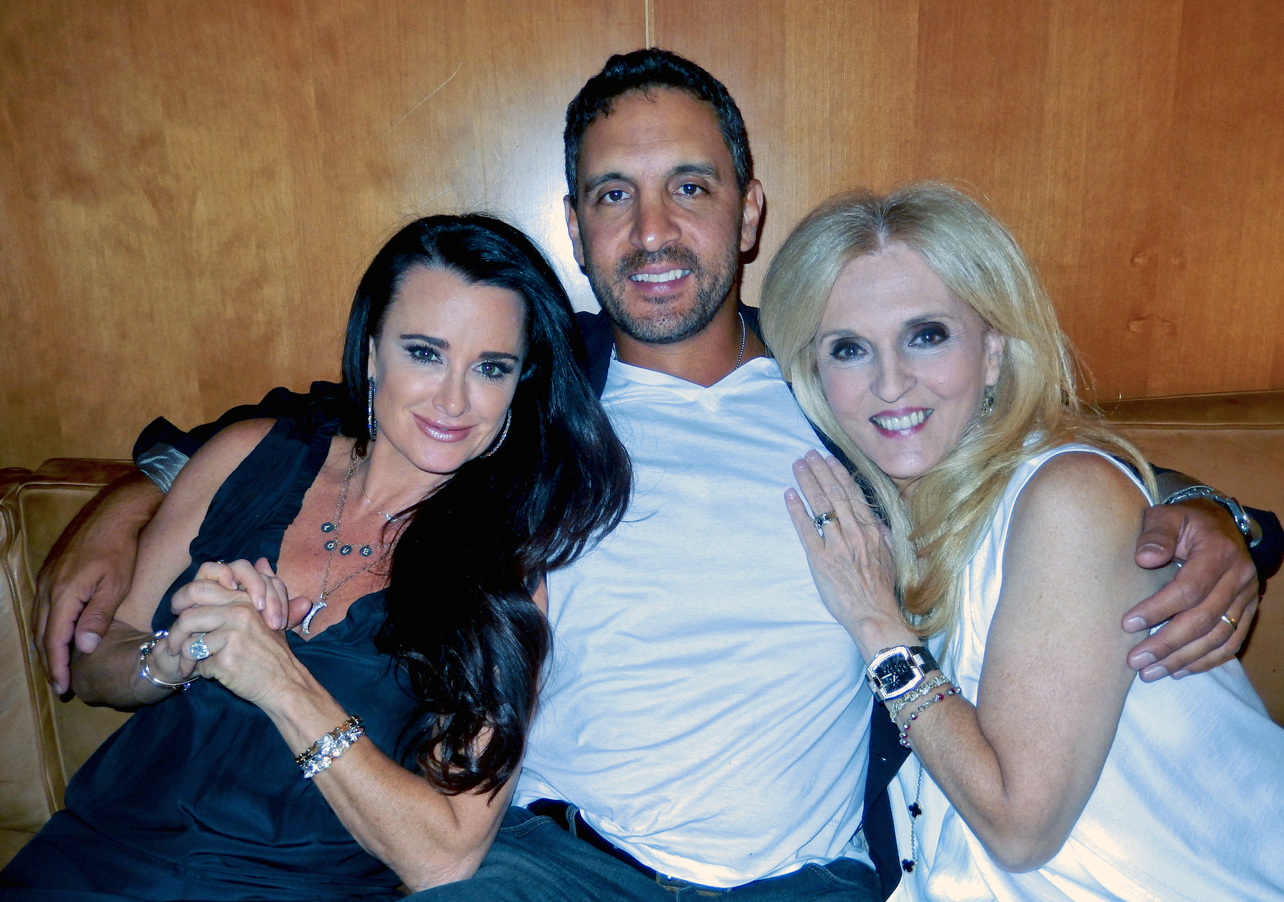
From Left: Daughter-in-law Kyle Richards, son Mauricio Umansky, and Dr. Estella Sneider at Estella's birthday party in 2013.

Daughter Sharon married Kendall Tyler Benton.

In 2014, a number of celebrities nominated Sneider for a Shorty Award, including Camille Grammer, Ann Wilson, Kyle Richards, Cristian Solis (wife of Marco Antonio Solís), and others, resulting in about 50 nominations overall.

== Awards ==
Year	Award	Result	Ref.
2015	Rose Diamond Award	Won	
2015	Multicultural Motion Picture Association - Media Award	Won	
2015	City of Los Angeles Certificate of Recognition	Awarded	
2015	The Hollywood Appreciation Society Lifetime Achievement Award	Won	
2015	State of California Senate Certificate of Recognition	Awarded	
2015	California Legislature Assembly Office of the Speaker Certificate of Recognition	Awarded	
2014	Shorty Award	Nominated	
2013	Women's International Zionist Organization (WIZO) Gala Honoree	Honored	
2013	Los Angeles County Sheriff's Department Certificate	Awarded	
2013	City of Los Angeles Certificate of Recognition	Awarded	

When WIZO named Sneider a Gala Honoree in 2013, she was thanked for her work in the organization by Californian politicians Brad Sherman, Adam B. Schiff, Zev Yaroslavsky, Bernard C. Parks, Bob Blumenfield, Curren D. Price, Jr., Eric Garcetti, Nury Martinez, and the Beverly Hills city council.

== Personal life ==
Sneider is regularly an attendee at society and charity events, including Nick Palance's galas.

Sneider has been open about having had plastic surgery. On season 2, episode 9 of RHOBH, Sneider underwent a facelift. During healing, Sneider did not appear on the show until episode 14, at which time her daughter-in-law Kyle stated "Only in Beverly Hills can your mother-in-law look younger than you".

In 2011, Sneider sent her condolences to fellow RHOBH alum Taylor Armstrong after her estranged husband, Russell Armstrong, committed suicide. E! News interviewed Sneider, where she talked about dealing with suicidal patients. "When I see general patients who have been suicidal, I ask what their plans are, why did they choose that. Explain the plans such as who will find them and what do they think people will think? It's amazing when people start exploring, they get to the message and the real pain that they're feeling. They let it go. Unfortunately, I wish more people would reach out and more professionals are there."

Along with psychology, sexology, charity work, and writing, Sneider is also a property photographer and runs Luxury Style Photography. The business is built around photographing upscale properties and homes which are being put on the market.

== Filmography ==
Date	Show	Role	Episode/Notes	Ref.
2008	Doctora Corazón	Principal		
2012	The Ricki Lake Show	Self	"She's The Boss"	
2013	The Brentwood Connection	Famous Sex Therapist		
2014	Stars Und Sternchen	Self	Agency Pictures - Awards	
2014	Society TV	Self		
2014	Hi Society	Self		
2014	Epperson Media Show	Self	2014 Los Angeles Fashion Week	
2014	900 Voices	Self	TV movie	
2014	Astro Royal	Self	Four episodes	
2014	Ron and Laura Take Back America	Associate producer		
2015	The EZ Show	Unknown	Viva the Doll Tour Pink Carpet	
2015	Cancer	Actress (Cancer), Director, writer, videographer, editor	Short	
2015	Beverly Hills Royal	Producer, director	Four episodes	
2010, 2015, 2021, 2023	The Real Housewives of Beverly Hills	Self / Kyle's mother-in-law	4 episodes	
