= Garrett Gardner =

American singer and songwriter

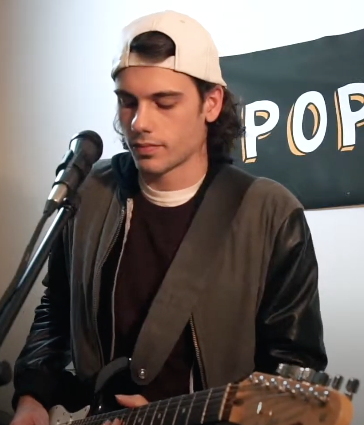
- Gardner in 2019

Background information
- Origin: Ringwood, New Jersey, U.S.
- Genres: Funk, rock, blues
- Occupation: Singer-songwriter
- Instruments: Vocals, guitar, drums, bass, keyboard

Garrett Gardner is an American singer and songwriter. He auditioned twice to the US edition of The Voice. His first attempt in season 3 ended in failure with no coach turning their chair, while his second attempt in season 4 earned him a spot on the Top 12 finals. He was eliminated finishing 11th–12th in the series. Gardner sings funky pop, rock, and blues.

== Early life ==
Gardner was born and raised in Ringwood, New Jersey, to parents who are both musicians. He began playing toy instruments like drums at the age of one. In an interview with Christina Milan, Gardner mentioned that his early musical experiences as a toddler eventually led to him playing real drums and other instruments as an adult. He attended Lakeland Regional High School.

== Career ==
=== The Voice, season 3 ===
In 2012, on season 3 of The Voice, Gardner auditioned but was not selected by any coaches. He sang "Have You Ever Seen the Rain?" by Creedence Clearwater Revival. He did receive constructive advice from coach Adam Levine. After his audition fell short, Gardner's father died, which encouraged him to try out again the next season.

=== The Voice, season 4 ===
On season 4 of The Voice, Gardner auditioned and joined Shakira's team, since she was the only judge to turn a chair. He sang the "Seven Nation Army" by The White Stripes, capturing Shakira's interest with his signature voice.

In the battle rounds, Gardner was paired with J'Sun from Team Shakira and performed "How You Like Me Now?". They were mentored by Joel Madden. After his performance, Shakira chose Gardner.

Gardner then went into the knockout rounds in which he competed against Tawnya Reynolds. He sang "Too Close" by Alex Clare and was chosen to enter the top 16 as semi-finalist.

As he advanced into the live playoffs, he sang "Imagine" by John Lennon where he played piano. His performance led the judges to save him, and he advanced to the top 12. Before the top 12 results, Team Shakira performed "We Are the Champions" in episode 15. Team Blake & Team Shakira joined forces, performing the song "Hall of Fame", as non-competition intermission number, with Gardner as part of the team.

In the top 12 live performances, Gardner crooned "I Want It That Way" by the Backstreet Boys, which received positive feedback from the judges. However, on results night, he did not get through to the top 10 by the public votes. Gardner exited the competition on May 14.

=== 2013–present ===
Later, Gardner was invited to perform as a guest on Fox's talk show Good Day New York. On May 17, 2013, he sang his original composition "The Valley".

==== Performances on The Voice ====
– Studio version of performance reached the top 10 on iTunes

Stage	Song	Original artist	Date	Order	Result
Blind Audition (Season 3)	"Have You Ever Seen The Rain?"	Creedence Clearwater Revival	September 10, 2012	1.4	No chairs turned
Blind Audition (Season 4)	"Seven Nation Army"	The White Stripes	April 1, 2013	3.5	Shakira turned Defaulted to Team Shakira
Battle Rounds	"How You Like Me Now?" (vs. J'Sun)	The Heavy	April 15, 2013	7.2	Saved by Coach
Knockout Rounds	"Too Close" (vs. Tawnya Reynolds)	Alex Clare	April 29, 2013	11.2	Saved by Coach
Live Playoffs	"Imagine"	John Lennon	May 7, 2013	15.1	Saved by Coach
Live Top 12	"I Want It That Way"	Backstreet Boys	May 13, 2013	17.3	Eliminated
