= Sonika Vaid =

American singer and tv personality

- Born: Sonika Kumari Vaid; August 4, 1995 (age 30); Weston, Massachusetts, U.S.
- Occupation(s): Television personality, real estate agent, singer
- Employer: The Agency RE
- Television: Buying Beverly Hills

Sonika Vaid (born August 4, 1995) is an American television personality, real estate agent, and singer. She placed fifth in the fifteenth season of American Idol, and appeared as a main cast member on the Netflix reality television series Buying Beverly Hills.

== Biography ==
Sonika Vaid is originally from Weston, Massachusetts, but moved to Martha's Vineyard. She comes from a musical family, citing her grandfather's love of music as the source of her musical ability.

== American Idol ==
Vaid got fifth place on season 15 of American Idol in 2016. She performed multiple songs by Ariana Grande, including "Almost Is Never Enough" on the first round in Hollywood. Her elimination took place after her performances of "Clarity" by Zedd and "Let It Go" from Disney's Frozen.

=== Performances ===
Week	Theme	Song(s)	Original artist(s)	Result
Auditions	Contestant's choice	"Look at Me"	Carrie Underwood	Advanced
Hollywood Week, Part 2	Group Round	"Problem"	Ariana Grande	Advanced
Hollywood Week, Part 3	First solo	"Almost Is Never Enough"	Ariana Grande & Nathan Sykes	Advanced
Hollywood Week, Part 4	Second solo	"One Last Time"	Ariana Grande	Advanced
Top 24	Contestant's choice	"Safe and Sound"	Capital Cities	Wild Card
Top 24	Duet Round	"Skyfall" (duet with Caleb Johnson)	Adele	Wild Card
Wild Card Round	Contestant's choice	"I Surrender"	Celine Dion	Advanced
Top 10	Contestant's choice	"Bring Me to Life"	Evanescence	Safe
Top 8	Idol Grammy Hits	"Since U Been Gone"	Kelly Clarkson	Saved by the judges
Top 6	American Idol All Time Song Book	"Rise Up" (duet with Avalon Young)	Andra Day	-
Top 6	American Idol All Time Song Book	"I Have Nothing"	Whitney Houston	Saved by the judges
Top 5	America's Twitter Song Choice	"Clarity"	Zedd	Eliminated
Top 5	America's Twitter Song Choice	"Let It Go"	Disney's Frozen	Eliminated

== Buying Beverly Hills ==
In 2022, Vaid started working as a real estate agent at The Agency RE under Mauricio Umansky. She has appeared as a main cast member on the Netflix reality television series Buying Beverly Hills since November 4, 2022.

== Filmography ==
Year	Title	Notes
2022–2024	Buying Beverly Hills	18 episodes
2016	American Idol (season 15)	Contestant
