= Holly Tucker (musician) =

American singer-songwriter

- Born: December 22, 1992 (age 33); Waco, Texas, US
- Genres: Country music
- Occupations: Singer and multi-instrumentalist
- Years active: 2007–present

Holly Tucker (born December 22, 1992) is an American country music singer and multi-instrumentalist from Lorena, Texas who starred on Season 4 of television series The Voice.

Tucker is a Waco, Texas native, where she also resides.

== Discography ==
=== Studio albums ===
- It's About Time (2007)
- Love Is What She Likes (2011)
- Steel (2016)
- Welcome to Waco (2018)
- You're Gonna Know My Name (2023)

=== EPs ===
- Something to Be Said (2012)

=== Demos ===
- For You (2009)

=== Singles ===
- "Wax Paper Cups" (feat. Ray Johnston) (2016)

=== Singles from The Voice ===
Year	Title	Peak chart positions	
Year	Title	US Country	US Bubbling
2013	"How Great Thou Art"	35	22
2013	"Done"	46	—
"—" denotes releases that did not chart
