= Kiara Aileen Machado =

American visual artist

Kiara Aileen Machado (born 1993) is an American visual artist known for paintings that utilize vibrant colors, plant life, and recuerditos (souvenirs).

== Biography ==
Machado was born in 1993 in Lynwood, California. She earned her Bachelor of Fine Arts (BFA) in drawing and painting at California State University Long Beach in 2018. Her Guatemalan Salvadoran family encouraged her artistic career and economically supports her. Machado's work features themes of femininity, identity, and culture, meant to explore the lack of Central American representation in Anglo-American and Latinx spaces.

== Art ==
The Quetzal Migrante is a collaborative art project consisting of East Bay artists including Machado, Lulu Matute, Dulce Lopez, Oona Valle, and others. In late 2019, they gathered at Playas de Tijuana to paint a mural on the U.S.-Mexican border wall and to provide healing workshops for migrants seeking asylum. Designed to illustrate the strength and suffering of the migrants, the mural consisted of quetzals, a mother holding her daughter's hand, and posters created by the migrant workshop participants.

¿Va O Viene? is a painting from the Products of Empire exhibition by Art Share L.A. It depicts a presumably Central American woman standing with her shirt illuminated but her face obscured. Machado stated that it was inspired by shirts with novelty phrases like "Yo vengo de Guatemala, y usted cuando viene". It translates to "I came from Guatemala, when are you coming?", and Machado explores the nuances of having the privilege of returning to one's homeland compared to migrants who are unable to return.

The mural Come Walk With Me was painted by Machado as part of the El Monte city campaign "Summer of Solidarity" by the "community-based system" LA vs. Hate. It portrays El Monte's Latinx, Asian, LGBTQ+, and Black communities with different cultural foods and businesses. Machado remarked that she drew inspiration from friendship and aimed to capture the city as a whole. In fact, citizens were part of the mural's creation as well. They could share their experiences of El Monte in workshops and suggest colors and ideas.

Machado's work is included in the following exhibitions and spaces: "Después De La Lluvia/After the Rain" (2023) with Arts at Blue Roof; "Llamáme Por Mi Nombre" (2023) at the Buckham Gallery; "En Medio: Senses of Migration" (2022) at the John and Geraldine Lilley Museum of Art; and "CARAVANA: Mobilizing Central American Art (1984-Present)" (2021) at SOMArts.
