= Francisco Machón Vilanova =

Salvadoran novelist

Francisco Machón Vilanova was a Salvadoran novelist, best known for his work Ola roja, which concerns the role of the indigenous populations of El Salvador that were massacred in the Matanza of 1932. The novel is distinct from other works treating the Matanza, such as those by Salarrué or Claribel Alegría, in its decidedly anti-communist perspective. It was published in 1948 in México City, despite being written in San Francisco, where Machón Vilanova spent the later part of his life.
