= Sasha Allen =

American singer and actress (born 1982)

Sasha Sierra Allen
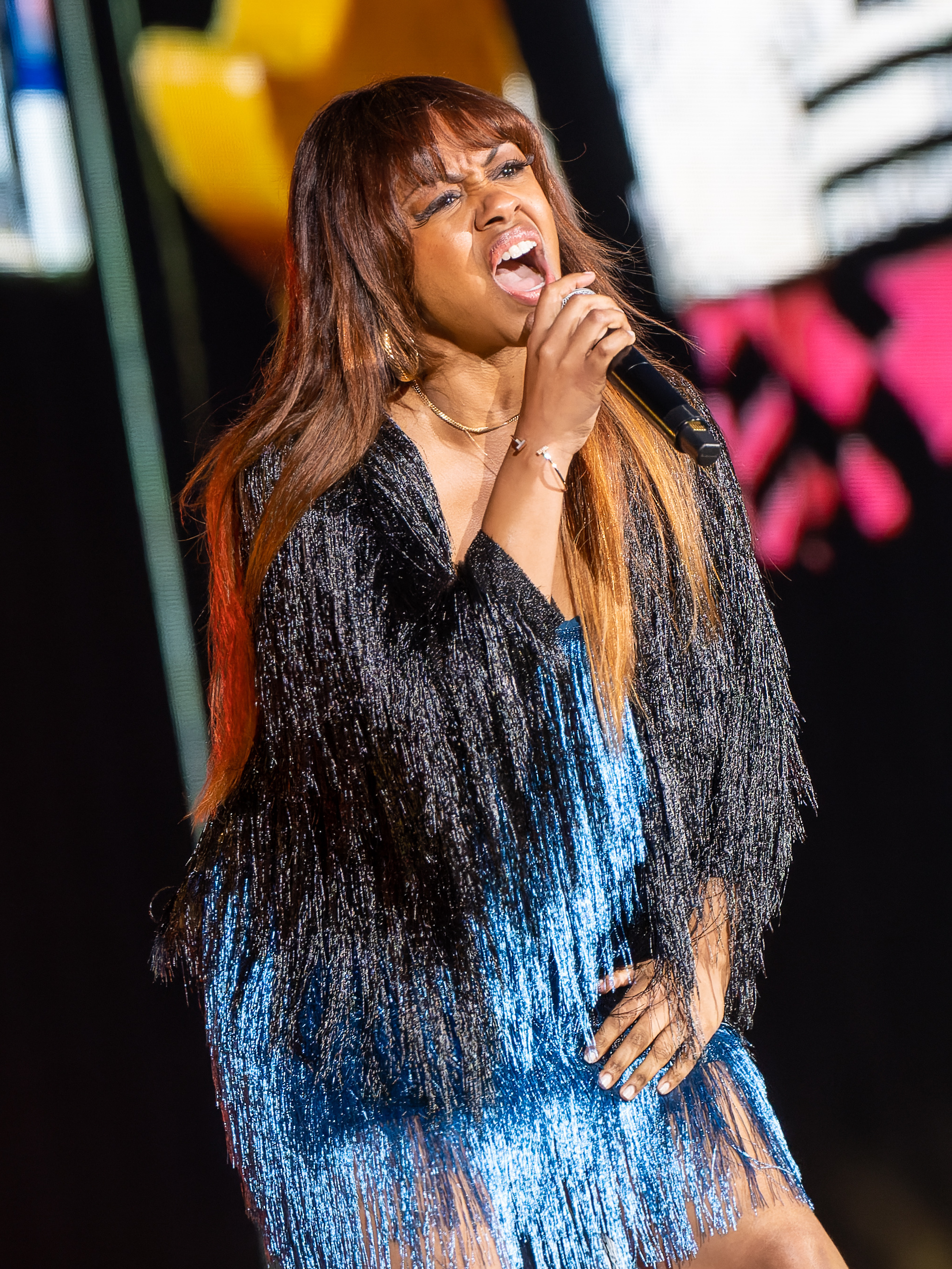
- Allen performing with The Rolling Stones at Hyde Park in 2022

Background information
- Born: Sasha Sierra Allen; June 4, 1982 (age 44); New York City, New York, U.S.
- Genres: R&B; rock; soul; pop
- Occupations: Singer; actress
- Years active: 1997–present

Sasha Sierra Allen (born June 4, 1982) is an American singer and actress. Born and raised in Harlem, New York, she began her career in the music industry as a backing vocalist for Christina Aguilera, Alicia Keys, John Legend, Leona Lewis, and Usher. In January 2016, she joined the Rolling Stones touring band. In May 2020, she joined The Pussycat Dolls touring band.

Allen portrayed Dionne in the 2009 Broadway revival and 2010 West End revival of Hair. In 2013, she was a semi-finalist on the fourth season of the American version of the singing competition TV series The Voice. She is not to be confused with Sasha Allen, a transgender man who was a semi-finalist on the 21st season of The Voice.

== Life and career ==
=== Early life ===
Allen's maternal Bermudian grandmother was one of the first people of African descent to attend Juilliard School of Music. Sasha's maternal grandfather and father were of African American descent. Allen is the elder of two children. She was educated at LaGuardia High School of Performing Arts in New York City.

At the age of 14, she starred in Andrew Lloyd Webber's Whistle Down the Wind. While still in high school, she was featured in commercial and print work, including advertisements in TIME magazine for AT&T.

At 17 she was signed to Elektra Records, working with producers Warryn Campbell (Mary Mary, Kanye West) and J. Moss (Karen Clark Sheard, Kiki Sheard). Later, she was signed by Arista Records when LA Reid was president. Her album, unfortunately, never came together. Allen says regarding her failed record contracts, “I got caught up in one of those crossroads moments in the record business [...] It was heartbreaking, because singing is what comes most naturally to me.” This caused Sasha to pursue other avenues of performing, such as acting.

=== 2000s ===
She was cast in the cult film Camp (2003) starring as "Dee." Allen was spotlighted on VH1's Born to Diva, a pre-American Idol talent reality TV show highlighting her talent.

She has performed on world tours and platinum albums of several performers, including Christina Aguilera's Back to Basics Tour and resulting DVD (Back to Basics: Live and Down Under), John Legend's album Once Again, and Kenny "Babyface" Edmonds' album Playlist. Allen was also the feature vocalist on Babyface's "Playlist" World Tour, singing the classic hits with Babyface that he wrote and produced for Whitney Houston, Toni Braxton, Madonna, and others. Sasha has also toured with Alicia Keys, Leona Lewis, and John Legend, performed with Usher and David Bowie, and recorded with Celine Dion. Allen's television work as a vocalist with musical director Rickey Minor garnered her performances with Jessica Simpson, Patti LaBelle, Yolanda Adams, Fantasia, and Clint Black.

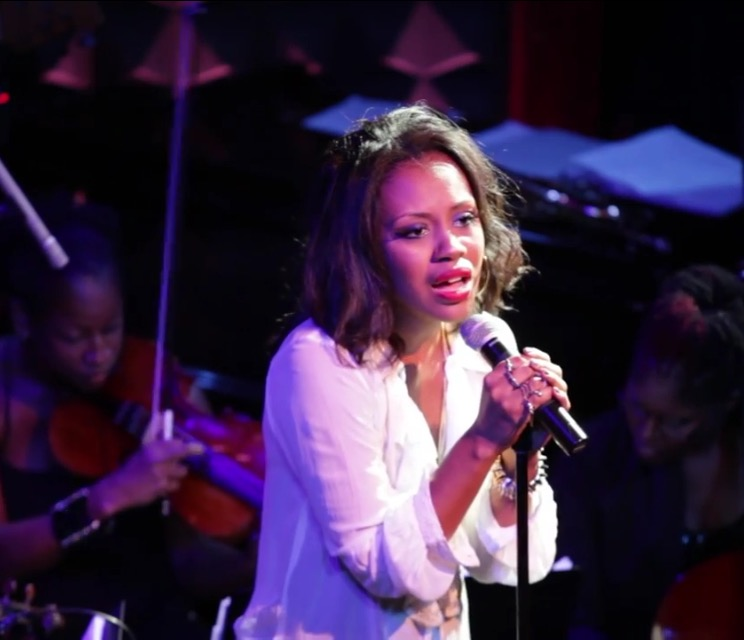
Allen Joe's Pub at the Public Theater in NYC, 2011.

Allen's music showcases her love for rock, soul and R&B. Her first single, "Let's Fly Away", was released on July 4, 2008, and the follow-up, a cover of Joan Osborne's "One Of Us", was released in September 2008. The remix for "Let's Fly Away", produced by Rob Lewis and TrakFire Productions climbed the dance charts.

From March 2009 to March 2010, she starred as Dionne in the Broadway revival of Hair at the Al Hirschfeld Theatre. She stayed with the production when it transferred to London's West End at the Gielgud Theatre from April to September 2010.

=== 2012–present, The Voice and afterwards ===
Returning to reality TV, Allen was selected as a participant for the fourth US season of The Voice. She auditioned with "Not Ready to Make Nice" by the Dixie Chicks, which turned all four coaches' chairs. Sasha decided to join Adam Levine's team. In the battle round she competed against Amber Carrington, who Adam would end up picking, making Sasha available to be stolen. Both Usher and Shakira pressed their button for Sasha, and she opted to join team Shakira. Allen would be the final remaining member of Team Shakira, and the first stolen contestant on The Voice to advance to the semifinals.

Between September 2014 and July 2015, Allen toured the United States as "The Leading Player" in a revival tour of the Broadway musical Pippin.

Allen joined The Rolling Stones on their América Latina Olé Tour 2016 as a backing vocalist, filling the role handled by Lisa Fischer since 1989 as Fischer had prior touring commitments. The role included duetting with Mick Jagger on "Gimme Shelter".

Her songs Oh! Darling peaked # 29 on the R&B/Hip-Hop Digital Songs, Ain't No Way # 17, Next To Me # 39, and I Will Always Love You # 39.

From November 2023 to January 2024, she was featured in the world premiere of Broadway star Gavin Creel's Off-Broadway musical Walk on Through: Confessions of a Museum Novice at the MCC Theater. She then joined the Broadway cast of MJ the Musical as Katherine Jackson at the Neil Simon Theatre.

==== The Voice performances and results ====
– Studio version of performance reached the top 10 on iTunes

Stage	Song	Original Artist	Date	Order	Result
Blind Audition	"Not Ready to Make Nice"	The Dixie Chicks	April 8, 2013	5.6	All four chairs turned Joined Team Adam
Battle Rounds	"Try" (vs. Amber Carrington)	Pink	April 15, 2013	7.1	Defeated; Stolen by Shakira
Knockout Rounds	"At Last" (vs. Shawna P.)	Etta James	April 29, 2013	11.8	Saved by Coach
Live Playoffs	"Oh! Darling"	The Beatles	May 7, 2013	15.8	Saved by Public Vote
Live Top 12	"Alone"	Heart	May 13, 2013	17.6	Saved by Public Vote
Live Top 10	"Next To Me"	Emeli Sande	May 20, 2013	20.5	Saved by Public Vote
Live Top 8	"Without You"	David Guetta feat. Usher	May 27, 2013	22.4	Saved by Public Vote
Live Top 6	"Ain't No Way"	Aretha Franklin	June 3, 2013	25.4	Saved by Public Vote
Live Top 6	"Before He Cheats"	Carrie Underwood	June 3, 2013	25.12	Saved by Public Vote
Live Top 5 (Semifinals)	"I Will Always Love You"	Dolly Parton	June 10, 2013	27.2	Eliminated
Live Top 5 (Semifinals)	"Bad Girls"	Donna Summer	June 10, 2013	27.7	Eliminated
