= Mauricio Umansky =

Real estate agent (born 1970)

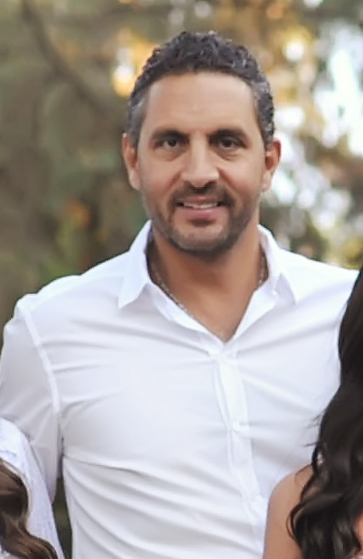
- Umansky in 2015
- Born: June 25, 1970 (age 56); Mexico
- Occupation: Real estate agent
- Employer: The Agency
- Spouse: Kyle Richards (m. 1996; sep. 2023)
- Children: 3
- Parents: Eduardo Umansky (father); Estella Sneider (mother)

Mauricio Umansky (born June 25, 1970) is a Mexican and American real estate agent, businessman and television personality. He is the co-founder and chief executive officer of The Agency, a luxury real estate brokerage. He is married to, but separated from, actress and television personality Kyle Richards.

== Early life ==
Umansky was born and raised in Mexico. He moved from Mexico City to Los Angeles at a young age. He had neutropenia. He is Jewish.

== Career ==
Umansky co-founded The Agency, which launched in September 2011, with Blair Chang and Billy Rose. Previously, he had worked at Hilton & Hyland. Umansky wrote the book The Dealmaker: How to Succeed in Business & Life Through Dedication, Determination & Disruption.

Umansky has appeared in The Real Housewives of Beverly Hills, The Real Housewives Ultimate Girls Trip and Dancing with the Stars.

In November 2022, Umansky started starring in Netflix's unscripted series Buying Beverly Hills, which follows Umansky and his staff at his real estate firm The Agency.

== Personal life ==
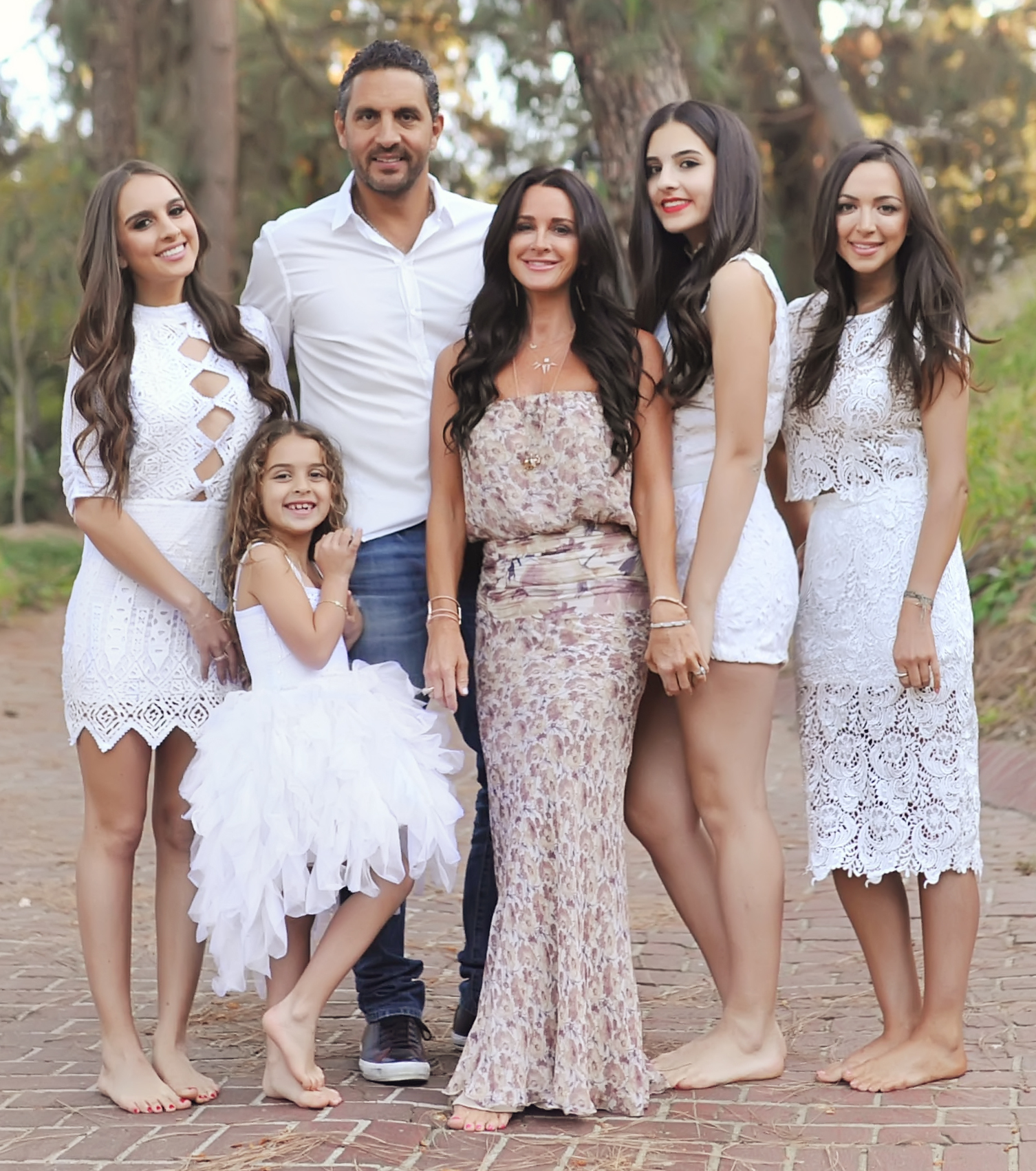
Umansky with wife Kyle Richards and daughters (2015)

Umansky and Kyle Richards met in 1994 at a club and got married on January 20, 1996. The couple's three daughters were born in 1996, 2000 and 2008; Richards also has a daughter from her first marriage, born in 1988. Umansky and Richards had a home in Bel Air. The couple have separated and Mauricio has since moved out of their home in the Beverly Hills.

== Filmography ==
Television
| Year | Title | Notes |
|---|---|---|
| 2005 | Newlyweds: Nick and Jessica | Episode: "Boys Weekend in Cabo" |
| 2005 | I Want to Be a Hilton | Episode: "Episode #1.4" |
| 2010–2024 | The Real Housewives of Beverly Hills | 166 episodes |
| 2016 | Rica, Famosa, Latina | Episode: "Episode #4.1" |
| 2021 | The Real Housewives Ultimate Girls Trip | 4 episodes |
| 2022–2024 | Buying Beverly Hills | 18 episodes; also executive producer |
| 2023 | Dancing with the Stars | Contestant on season 32; 8 episodes |
| 2026 | The Real Housewives of Potomac | Episode: "The Rocky Road to Sisterhood" |
| 2026 | The Valley: Persian Style | Episode: "Desert Storm" |
| 2026 | Million Dollar Listing Nederland | 2 episodes |
| 2026 | Special Forces: World's Toughest Test | Contestant on season 5 |
