= Thalia Gochez =

Thalia Gochez (born 1994) is a photographer, creative director, and fashion stylist. She is known for her photography work and aesthetic that captures visuals featuring women of color, with a focus on Latinx women.

== Biography ==
Gochez was born in Pasadena, California at age 14 to immigrant parents. She is Salvadorian Mexican American. Her mother is from Mexico and her father is from El Salvador. At age 14 her father immigrated to the US from El Salvador due to a civil war taking place. He lived alone in his youth and fought for a better life, in which he was able to provide for Thalia and her mother in Los Angeles, California. She was always told El Salvador was dangerous and not visitable which sparked even more longing for that part of her identity. Around age 18, she began dealing with grief, so she moved to San Francisco with her friend to hopefully figure her identity out. While living in San Francisco's Mission District, she studied at San Francisco City College, earning an Associate's degree in fashion merchandising in the fall of 2018. With an “if he can do it, why can’t I” type of mentality, Thalia began following her dream of becoming a photographer. Photography was the only thing that helped her feel free of anxiety, and helped her not only liberate the community, but liberate herself as well.

=== Her Reason ===
She is known for her photography work and aesthetic that captures visuals featuring women of color, with a focus on Latinx women. In 2017 she felt there was a deep lack of “representation” in the world especially for women of color. It was during this time when she began to use her photography as the building block to bring the beauty of the marginalized out into the real world. She emphasis how it is hard to make your subjects feel like they are worthy and enough if you do not express your own self-love. Self love is like a muscle that needs to be consistently worked on. She makes women feel beautiful through her photography and helps show them that knowing others’ opinions do not define who you are meant to be. Creativity flourishes when self love is there, and through this Thalia was able to escape depression and find her own worth while giving clients theirs as well.

She began photographing girls in her local community, making sure to capture the best qualities and angles. Gochez’s work prioritizes emotional connections between her and her subjects which fosters a comfortable and positive environment. She prioritizes joy with her clients so that it ripples through the community.

Aside from her published work, Gochez supports her community through a non-profit organization called Los Fotos Project. This is an organization where people, primarily Latinos, can come and have their photo taken. More than a photoshoot, this program empowers both young girls and boys of color allowing them to see themselves in a confident manner.

=== Art ===
Thalía Gochez’s art is primarily portrait and documentary-style photography focused on Latinx identity, women of color, self-love, and cultural representation. The subject she chooses to photograph is everything. They determine the creativity, location, and give the project its heartbeat to come alive. A lot of her photography is centered around making people who are often overlooked feel seen. This is shown in her Yo Soy Latina project; a project that focuses specifically on representing darker skinned Latinas who are excluded from traditional beauty standards.

In 2021 the Creative Review recognized Gochez for her zeitgeist impact and she was also included in Dazed 100 list, an annual platforms that aims to showcase and celebrate the influence of 100 individuals from around the world who are making an impact in shaping culture that same year . Gochez has worked with brands such as Ceremonia, Apple, Nike, and Rare Beauty. Her work has been featured in Aperature, Latina Magazine, The New York Times, Teen Vogue, the Cut in New York Magazine, Rolling Stone Magazine, and I.D Magazine. Gochez has worked with musical artist, La Dona, to create the album artwork for her 2020 EP Algo Nuevo. Gochez captured photography stills for Don Julio’s global campaign for Por Amor, in their film' titled 'A Love Letter to Mexico.' Gochez was recognized by Las Fotos Project: The Foto Awards and Silent Auction awarded her the Editorial Award on October 23, 2021.

Gochez’s work was also featured in Chicano Camera Culture: A Photographic History, 1966 to 2026, an exhibition at the Riverside Art Museum and The Cheech Marin Center for Chicano Art & Culture. The exhibition highlighted how photography has been used over generations as a way for Chicano and Latinx artists to express cultural identity, preserve history, and create representation through visual storytelling. Her inclusion in the exhibition reflects how her photography continues this movement by uplifting marginalized communities and creating space for women of color to feel seen, valued, and represented.

== Notable works ==
- Hermanas de Sangre (2018), a solo exhibit. An exhibit that showcased the moments of childhood in the Mission district of San Francisco
- De Donde Eres? (2023) At Galerie Kernweine in Stuttgard, Germany.
- 'A Love Letter to Mexico' (2023) Don Julio Tequila Campaign for Pon Amor titled 'A Love Letter to Mexico'
- KIDS OF IMMIGRANTS x TELEMUNDO (2023) Gochez worked as the photographer in collaboration with Kids of Immigrants and short film director David Camarena for Telemundo to celebrate Women's soccer and its impact on the Latino community.
