= Theresa Griffin (disambiguation) =

Theresa Griffin (born 1962) is a British politician.

Theresa Griffin may also refer to:

- Theresa Griffin (swimmer) (born 1988), New Zealand swimmer
- Terisa Griffin, American singer-songwriter
