= Driveblind =

UK musical group

- Origin: Aberdeen, Scotland
- Genres: Rock
- Years active: 2000–2008
- Label: Geffen
- Past members: Terry McDermott (vocals); Nick Tyler (lead guitar); Jack Morrice (bass guitar); Dave Nicholson (keyboards); Dave McKay (drums); Cameron Taylor (rhythm guitar)

Driveblind was a Scottish rock band.

== History ==
Driveblind was formed in Aberdeen in Scotland in 2001. Originally a two-piece singer-songwriter partnership comprising Nick Tyler and Terry McDermott, they recorded a few songs on cassette, later recruiting other band members to complete the band. By 2004, the band had moved to the United States.

They released their debut self-titled album on 24 October 2006, via Geffen Records. They would break up in 2008.

=== After Driveblind ===
After Driveblind, Terry McDermott left for the United States where he resided and married continuing his musical career there. He went on to form Lotus Crush. On 1 August 2012, it was announced that McDermott had auditioned for season 3 of the NBC television show The Voice, becoming part of Team Blake. He finished as the runner-up.

== Discography ==
- 2006: Driveblind
- 2008: The Future You Were Promised EP
