= Nicholas David =

American singer

- Born: Nicholas David Mrozinski; Minneapolis, Minnesota, U.S.
- Genres: soul, pop, Jazz, R&B
- Occupations: Musician, singer, songwriter, producer
- Instruments: Vocals, piano, keyboards, synthesizer, guitar
- Years active: 2004–present
- Label: Wake the World
- Website: thefeelin.com

Nicholas David Mrozinski, formerly known by the stagename "The Feelin'", is an American soul singer-songwriter based in St. Paul, Minnesota. He was a finalist on the third season of NBC’s The Voice. Performed at Greeley Blues Jam 2018 with the Devon Allman Project

== Early life ==
Nicholas David Mrozinski was born in Minneapolis, Minnesota, on August 14, 1980. He attended St. Joseph’s Catholic School in Rosemount, Minnesota, from 1986 to 1995 (kindergarten-8th grade), and Eagan High School. He began piano lessons in the second grade, voice lessons in tenth grade, and sang and listened to classical and jazz music. He learned to play by ear and as a teenager would often play for his mother before going to bed. His grandfather was also an accomplished musician who plays the accordion.

== Music career ==
David began his recording career in 2004 with the release "Four Legged Light", a solo acoustic album produced under his own Label, Wake the World. He would go on to record four more albums/EPs under that label. From 2007-2012 he would play four or five gigs a week around the Twin Cities area.

== The Voice ==
In 2012, David auditioned for the third season of The Voice. He won a spot on Cee Lo Green's team, where he was dubbed "St. Nick". One of his signature performances was singing "You Are So Beautiful" to his pregnant wife, where both he and coach Cee Lo Green teared up. On early episodes of the show David opened up about his struggles with sobriety, weight gain, and his spirituality.

=== Performances on The Voice ===
Round	Song	Original Artist	Order	Result
Blind Audition	"Stand By Me"	Ben E. King	12	Defaulted to Cee Lo Green's team
Battle Round	"She's Gone" (vs. Todd Kessler)	Hall & Oates	4	Saved by coach
Knockout Round	"Put Your Records On" (vs. Mycle Wastman)	Corinne Bailey Rae	9	Saved by coach
Live Playoffs	"You're the First, the Last, My Everything"	Barry White	7	Safe (Public Vote)
Top 12	"The Power of Love"	Huey Lewis & the News	10	Safe
Top 10	"Lean on Me"	Bill Withers	7	Safe
Top 8	"What's Going On"	Marvin Gaye	7	Safe
Top 6	"September"	Earth, Wind & Fire	1	Safe
Top 6	"Over the Rainbow"	Judy Garland	12	Safe
Semifinals	"You Are So Beautiful"	Billy Preston	2	Safe
Finale	"Great Balls of Fire"/"Fire"	Jerry Lee Lewis/The Jimi Hendrix Experience	1	Third Place

=== After The Voice ===
After appearing on The Voice, David began work on his sixth album. He plans to continue writing music and recording in his home state of Minnesota.

== Discography ==
=== Studio albums ===
David has completed six studio albums as well as one compilation album, The Minnesota Beatle Project, which was named "Best Local Compilation CD" by the City Pages. David's "Say Goodbye" debuted at #44 on the Billboard to 200 charts and charted for a couple weeks on the alternative charts.

Title	Album details	Peak chart positions		Certifications (sales threshold)
Title	Album details	US R&B	US	Certifications (sales threshold)
Four Legged Light (iTunes only)	Release date: January 1, 2004; Label: Wake the World; Formats: CD, music download	-	-	
Oak Chase Way	Release date: January 1, 2008; Label: Wake the World; Formats: CD, music download	-	-	
Together We're Stronger	Release date: June 9, 2009; Label: Wake the World; Formats: CD	-	-	
The Sacred Play of Life with The Feelin Band	Release date: June 7, 2011; Label: Wake the World; Formats: CD	-	-	
In Formation (EP-iTunes only) with Dylan Nau	Release date: February 22, 2011; Label: Wake the World; Formats: music download	-	-	
The Minnesota Beatle Project	Release date: Label: Formats: CD	-	-	
Say Goodbye (EP-iTunes only)	Release date: June 11, 2013; Label: Wake the World; Formats: music download	-		
With These Hands	Release date: April 15, 2016; Label: Wake the World; Formats: music download	-		
"—" denotes releases that did not chart
