= Collin McLoughlin =

American singer-songwriter

- Origin: New York, U.S.
- Occupation(s): Music producer, writer, singer

Collin McLoughlin is an American record producer, songwriter, and singer from Bedford, New York, United States. As of February 2019, he had achieved over 18 million views on his YouTube channel, has been featured on tracks with Dash Berlin Laidback Luke, and Hardwell and was a member of Teams Adam and Blake on Season 3 of The Voice.

== Early years ==
McLoughlin began performing music at a young age. His first experience with guitar was in middle school during the 7th grade mandatory music class. Although he claimed to have not been initially interested in music McLoughlin credits this early exposure to it as an instrumental aspect of his development. He left Rippowam in middle school to attend Wooster School in Danbury, CT during his freshman year of High School.

McLoughlin began taking guitar lessons in ninth grade at Wooster School. Shortly afterwards he began to perform and write original songs. After his high school education McLoughlin attended Colgate University.

After his success with Nautical Young McLoughlin pursued a solo career, eventually linking up with rapper Sammy Adams and performing as an opener for several sold-out shows with the artist including the House of Blues in Boston and the Stone Pony in Asbury Park, NJ. He credits this early exposure from Sammy Adams as an important stepping stone in his career.

The following fall McLoughlin set out to attend New York University's Music Business Graduate Program, only to take a leave of absence after one year to pursue his dream of being a professional musician.

== Career ==
=== YouTube success ===
McLoughlin's first YouTube video was released shortly after he took the leave of absence from NYU. The song covered in the video was his acoustic rendition of Swedish House Mafia's "Save the World", co-produced with former Nautical Young producer Garrington Spence. The video was shot and edited by Jon Kilmer, and since its release on May 22, 2011, the video has received nearly two million views. McLoughlin built off the success of this initial video by making a mashup based around Gym Class Heroes's "Stereo Hearts", and later several other videos with similar success. After releasing eight covers of popular songs on YouTube his channel swelled with nearly twelve million views along with over fifty thousand subscribers.

=== Season 3 of The Voice ===
In the spring of 2012, Collin McLoughlin auditioned to be on Season 3 of The Voice, and ended up being selected for an opportunity to perform at the Blind Auditions. McLoughlin ultimately sang a rendition of Cat Stevens' popular song "Wild World," which convinced Cee Lo Green, Adam Levine and Blake Shelton to turn their chairs in an attempt to add him to their respective teams. McLoughlin ultimately joined Maroon 5 frontman Adam Levine's team, citing an early affinity to the rocker's music and style.

In the Battle Rounds, McLoughlin was paired with Bronx singer Bryan Keith, and asked to perform a duet of Sublime's "Santeria." Working with Levine Mary J. Blige and on the rendition, McLoughlin ultimately lost the bout with Bryan, only to be saved by Blake Shelton and Cee Lo Green. After hearing the comments from both Collin decided to join Shelton's team, making him the first artist stolen in the show's history.

=== Tears Of Tempo ===
In July 2013 Collin McLoughlin announced an entirely new self-produced melodic dubstep EP, Tears Of Tempo. Starting July 16, he promised to release one track a week every Tuesday. The first song released was titled "Chasing Ghosts," and was released with a YouTube video. The third single off of the EP "One Desire," was also released with a music video. The EP has thus far been met with widespread blog support, and has been featured on high traffic blogs and websites including Dubstep.NET (on which Chasing Ghosts hit the #1 ranking the week it was released). Barstool U and IntoTheAM,

In an interview with FreshNewTracks.com, Collin addressed the initial response his Tears Of Tempo EP received He said, "When I released my debut Tears Of Tempo EP online, people thought I had a ghost producer making my material, since I had never shown aptitude producing anything beyond super raw acoustic covers previously. On top of that the fact that I was on The Voice has made it even harder for me to break that stigma of just being a singer, but I think now that I'm showing people what I'm made of the stigma is starting to change. At this point singing is a tool in my arsenal, it isn't my defining characteristic any longer. Production for me became a way to extend my artistic vision beyond pure words and vocal melody, it allows me to create entire sonic landscapes that house the words I sing or remix."

=== 2013 – present ===
McLoughlin has also grown to significant prominence in the world of underground electronic dance music, especially the melodic dubstep genre. He's regarded as "one of the absolute kings in the realm of melodically driven and euphorically inspired dubstep." In addition, he has provided vocals for songs well known in the EDM world, such as "Heartbeat" by the Dutch house duo Vicetone, and more recently, "Collide", with Laidback Luke & Project 46. In an interview with EDMSauce.com, Collin said "collaborating with Laidback Luke was really cool, I used to frequent his production forum two years ago trying to find any sort of tips I could absorb. To be featured on a track of his that I wrote two years later is pretty surreal." In addition to his vocal success, McLoughlin has received acclaim for his melodic bass remixes that have been supported by the likes of Don Diablo, Morgan Page, and 3lau. In 2014 Collin was named as one of the "10 Acts to Watch in 2014" by popular website EDMTunes.com as well as YourEDM.com.

In March 2014, Dash Berlin previewed an "ID" at Utrecht (ASOT 650) that had many speculating as to whether Collin's vocals were featured on the single. On June 6, McLoughlin formally announced the "Here Tonight" collaboration with Jay Cosmic and Dash Berlin off his forthcoming "We Are" album releasing on Armada. On July 25, the "Here Tonight" video, shot on location in Mérida, Mexico, was subsequently released online to considerable fanfare. EDMSauce.com, EDMTunes.com, and YouTube channel Proximity dubbed "Here Tonight" a "summer anthem".

== Discography ==
=== As featured artist ===
- 2012: "Spaceman Unplugged" (with Hardwell) (Revealed Recordings)
- 2013: "Heartbeat: (with Vicetone) (Monstercat)
- 2013: "Here with You" (with Fred V & Grafix) (Hospital Records)
- 2014: "Collide" (with Laidback Luke & Project 46) (MixMash)
- 2014: "Here Tonight" (with Dash Berlin & Jay Cosmic) [Armada]

=== Remixes ===
Year	Song	Artist
2013	"Starlight"	Don Diablo & Matt Nash
2013	"Escape"	3lau & Paris & Simo featuring Bright Lights
2013	"Body Work"	Morgan Page featuring Tegan & Sara
2013	"Fix You"	Coldplay
2014	"Castle Walls"	Christina Aguilera featuring T.I.
2014	"Transatlanticism"	Deathcab For Cutie
2014	"Feral Love (Game Of Thrones)"	Chelsea Wolfe
2014	"White Flag"	Dido

== Live performances ==
- Live at Cielo in NYC.
- Live at Pacha in NYC.
- Headlined at Winstons Supperclub in Dallas.
- Headlined at XTINE in Puerto Vallarta.
- Headlined at Mandala in Puerto Vallarta.
- Headlined at NAGA in Boston.
- Performed with Dash Berlin at Craneway Pavilion in San Francisco.
- Performed with Dash Berlin at The Palladium in Los Angeles.
