= Terry McDermott (singer) =

Scottish singer (born 1977)

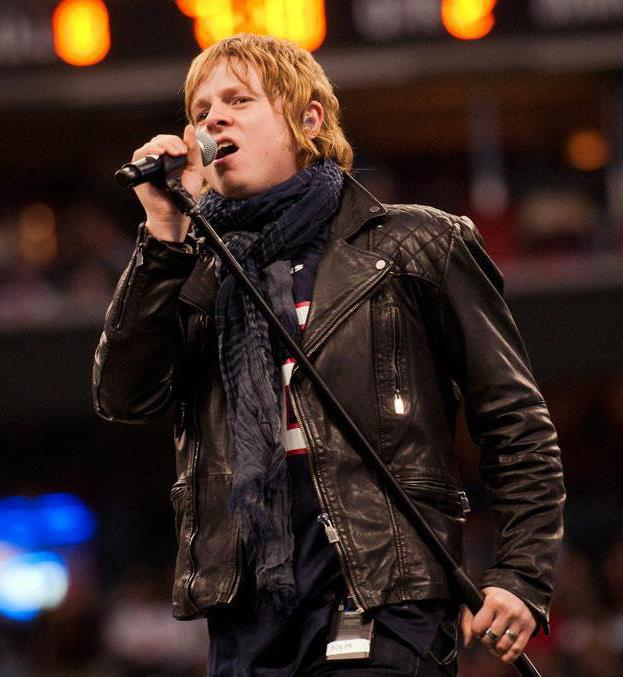

Background information
- Born: 6 August 1977 (age 49); Aberdeen, Scotland
- Genres: Rock; country rock
- Occupation: Singer-songwriter
- Instrument: Vocals
- Years active: 2000–present
- Labels: Fat Hippy Records (2003); Geffen (2004–2007); A&M (2003–2004); Fat Hippy Records (2013–present); Cavigold Records (2014–present)
- Website: terrymacmusic.com

Terry McDermott (born 6 August 1977) is a Scottish singer-songwriter. He has been part of a number of bands including Driveblind in the UK, and Lotus Crush in the US. In 2012, he came to prominence as the runner-up of the third season of the American version of The Voice.

== Early life ==
McDermott came from Pitmedden, Aberdeenshire, Scotland. He is a follower of the Aberdeen football club.

== Career ==
McDermott became a singer in the Aberdeen-based Driveblind that was founded as a collaboration and two-piece singer-songwriter partnership between McDermott on vocals and Nick Tyler on lead guitar. After recording a number of songs together released on cassette, more members joined in, namely Cameron Taylor (rhythm guitar), Jack Morrice (bass guitar), Dave Nicholson (keyboards) and Dave McKay (drums). After quickly establishing themselves in the local Aberdeen music scene, they travelled for shows in New York and Los Angeles in spring 2003, eventually basing themselves in the latter that summer, after being signed to A&M Records. President of A&M Ron Fair became the head of Geffen Records soon after, taking Driveblind with him to the label. Driveblind released a debut self-titled album Driveblind on 24 October 2006, via Geffen Records. The band toured extensively throughout the US supporting and performing with acts such as Taylor Hawkins of the Foo Fighters, Candlebox, Whitestarr, Nikka Costa, Matisyahu, the Bravery, Hot Hot Heat, the Charlatans UK and English band the Thieves. This was followed by an EP, entitled The Future You Were Promised with all new materials in 2008.

After things fell through, McDermott left Los Angeles for New Orleans where he settled with his wife and son. In 2009, he formed yet another rock and alternative pop band called Lotus Crush with Candlebox members Peter Klett and Scott Mercado (who met McDermott when Driveblind supported Candlebox in 2006) MIGGS member John Luzzi, and Second Coming bassist, Johnny Bacolas. Based in Seattle, Lotus Crush released its debut album Half Light Morning released on Fontana on 3 March 2011, appearing at the SXSW music festival in Austin, Texas the following month.

He has also been part of a formation called Northsouth with Afghan Whigs guitarist Dave Rosser. McDermott takes part in vocals, guitar and production. Since McDermott's second-place finish on The Voice, he has released his single 'Pictures' which peaked at number one on the ITunes rock charts. His fan base is continually growing stronger, dubbing themselves the "McHobbits".

McDermott performs with his band, Terry McDermott and the Bonfires. The line up (entirely New Orleans–based) include Americans David Rosser (Afghan Whigs, Twilight Singers, Gutter Twins, Northsouth), Eric Bolivar (Anders Osbourne, Eric Burden & the Animals) and British bass player Alex Smith (World Leader Pretend, Rotary Down). The Bonfires completed a summer UK tour, releasing Palmetto Heights on Scottish independent label Fat Hippy Records, before returning for headline shows in Scotland in December.

The winter of 2013 also saw McDermott perform the American national anthem for both the New Orleans Pelicans NBA team and the NFL's New Orleans Saints, singing before the Saints vs. Carolina Panthers game to a full house. McDermott was also a guest of his favourite Scottish football team Aberdeen FC in December, making an appearance on the pitch prior to the side's game against Ross County.

December 2013 included a live performance in Ho Chi Minh City, Vietnam on The Voice Vietnam, appearing as a special guest.

McDermott reunited with Lotus Crush in the summer of 2014, signing with Cavigold Records, a Seattle independent record label. Lotus Crush's sophomore record Rabbit Hole was recorded at Robert Lang Studios in Seattle and a follow-up to 2011's Half Light Morning was released in March 2015. The music video for the album's first single "Hearts and Minds" features actor C. Thomas Howell as the narratives villain. "Hearts and Minds" was released in January 2015.

In January 2021, McDermott and his band Lotus Crush signed under the management of MVK Music Group, led by manager Brian Paul, one of the owners and founders of MVK Music Group.

== The Voice ==
On 1 August 2012, Terry McDermott auditioned for season 3 of the NBC television show The Voice.

Performances

His performance of the hit "Baba O'Riley" by the Who was broadcast on 10 September 2012 opening the Blind Auditions of the third season of the show. Three of the four judges (Adam Levine, Cee Lo Green and Blake Shelton) hit the "I Want You" button. McDermott chose to be a part of Team Blake.

During the Battle Rounds, McDermott performed the Kansas song "Carry On Wayward Son", with country singer Casey Muessigmann. Both singers received praise for their performance, but Blake Shelton chose to continue with McDermott.

Reaching the Final 3 stage, he finished as the runner-up (second place), with Cassadee Pope, the lead vocalist of the pop rock band Hey Monday, finishing first. As of the final show of The Voice Season 3, McDermott had seven of the top 10 (including all of the top five) songs on the iTunes Rock chart.

For the show's fifth season, McDermott became the social media host in the live shows.

=== Performances and results ===
Studio Version of song charted on the iTunes Top 10

Show	Song	Original Artist	Order	Result
Blind Audition	"Baba O'Riley"	The Who	1.1	Adam Levine, CeeLo Green, and Blake Shelton turned McDermott joined Blake Shelton's Team
Battle Round	"Carry On Wayward Son" (vs. Casey Muessigmann)	Kansas	10.1	Saved by Blake Shelton
Knockout Round	"Maybe I'm Amazed" (vs. Rudy Paris)	Paul McCartney	17.7	Saved by Blake Shelton
Live Playoffs	"Don't Stop Believin'"	Journey	18.2	Saved (Public Vote)
Top 12	"More Than a Feeling"	Boston	21.12	Safe
Top 10	"Summer of '69"	Bryan Adams	23.2	Safe
Top 8	"Over"	Blake Shelton	25.3	Safe
Top 6	"I Want to Know What Love Is"	Foreigner	27.4	Safe
Top 6	"Stay With Me"	Faces	27.7	Safe
Top 4 (Semi-finals)	"Let It Be"	The Beatles	29.4	Safe
Top 3 (Finals)	"Dude (Looks Like a Lady)" (w/ Blake Shelton)	Aerosmith	31.3	Runner-up
Top 3 (Finals)	"Broken Wings"	Mr. Mister	31.5	Runner-up
Top 3 (Finals)	"I Want to Know What Love Is"	Foreigner	31.7	Runner-up

== In popular culture ==
- His vocals appear in a Japanese advertisement for Coke Zero. It was used in a Japanese Soccer League theme and played during J-League matches in Japan.

== Discography ==
=== Albums ===
with Driveblind

- 2006: Driveblind
- 2008: The Future You Were Promised EP

with Lotus Crush

- 2011: Half Light Morning
- 2015: Rabbit Hole

with Terry McDermott & The Bonfires

- 2013: Palmetto Heights EP

=== Singles ===
Year	Single	Peak chart positions			
Year	Single	US	CAN	US Rock	US Country
2012	"I Want to Know What Love Is"	84	62	—	—
2012	"Let It Be"	70	56	—	—
2013	"Dude (Looks Like a Lady)" (with Blake Shelton)	—	—	—	43
2013	"Pictures"	—	—	27	—
2013	"In Your Eyes"	—	—	—	—
"—" denotes releases that did not chart
