= Suzanna Choffel =

American singer-songwriter and musician

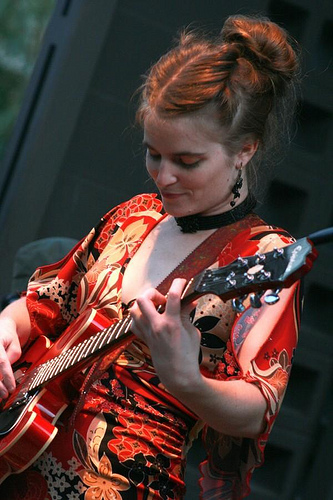
- Suzanna Choffel live at SXSW Music Festival, 2009

Background information
- Born: Suzanna Louise Choffel; March 4, 1980 (age 46)
- Origin: Austin, Texas, U.S.
- Genres: Indie folk, pop, reggae, R&B
- Occupations: Musician, songwriter
- Instruments: Vocals, guitar
- Years active: 2004–present
- Labels: Middlebitty, Universal Republic, Red Parlor
- Formerly of: Spanish Gold
- Website: suzannachoffel.com

Suzanna Choffel (born March 4, 1980) is an American singer-songwriter and musician who has appeared on national television and in film. Known for her distinct voice and reggae-inspired guitar technique, her music has been described as "a unique sound equal parts Beat poetry, smoky soul grooves and indie-pop eccentricity".

== Early life ==
Choffel's given name is a variation inspired by Leonard Cohen's song "Suzanne". She was born in Austin, Texas into a music-loving family and began writing songs at a young age. Her earliest compositions were simple voice-and-keyboard pop pieces, which she recorded herself on a karaoke machine.

When she was 12 her parents divorced and Choffel moved with her mother and two sisters from the suburbs, first to The Drag and then to South Austin, where she spent her formative years.

Choffel was a paid performer by age 14, joining R&B band Red-Headed Stepchild and singing her first club shows at the Saxon Pub, Broken Spoke and Continental Club. At 17 she was singing in Bonnie Raitt and Bessie Smith blues jams downtown at Babe's on Sixth Street. She taught herself how to play guitar after seeing Patty Griffin perform at the Cactus Cafe and when she "got into Bob Marley and wanted to make those funky, percussive sounds that he and Peter Tosh played".

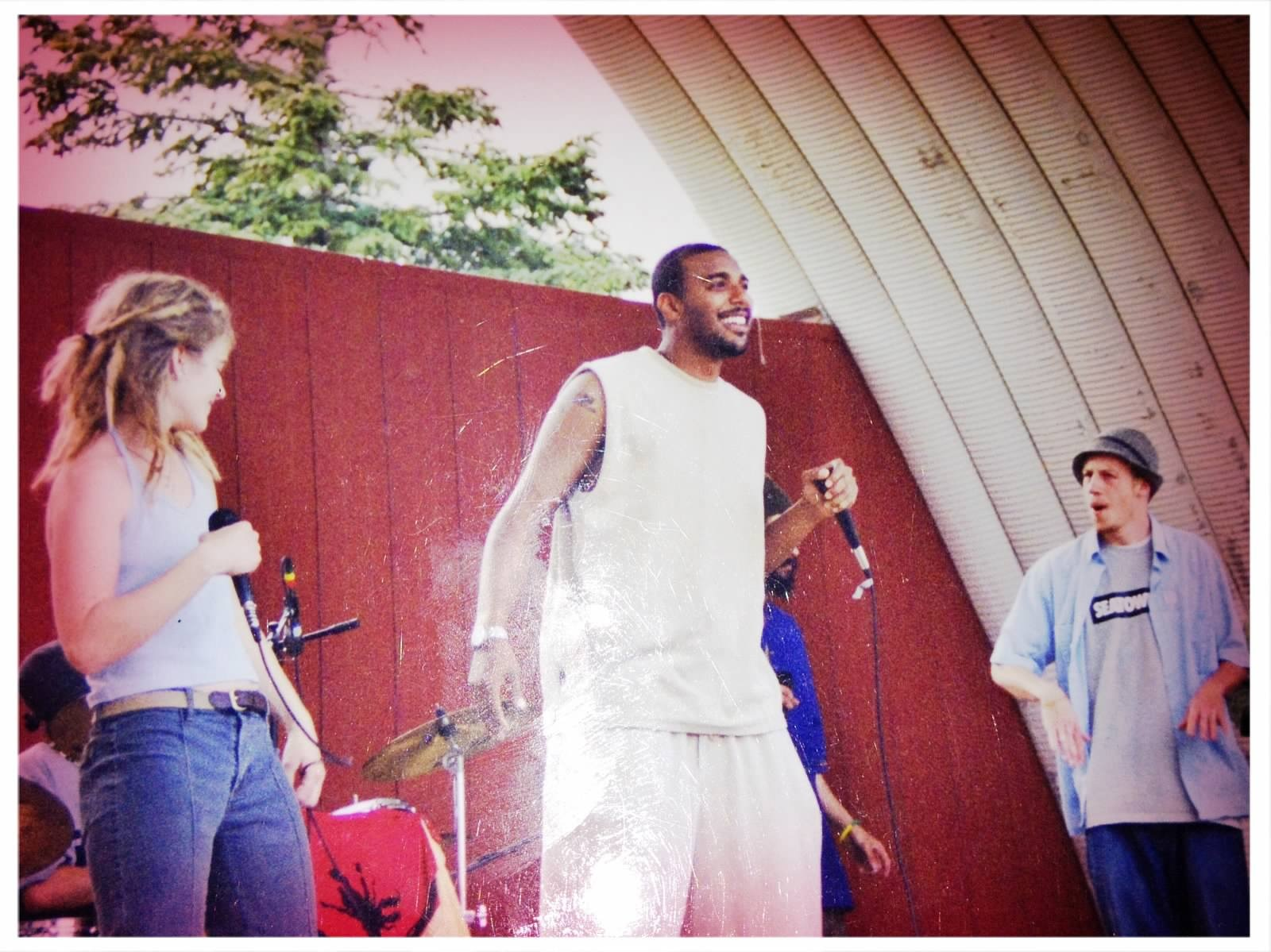
Choffel on stage with Paul Rivers Bailey and Ben Haggerty aka Macklemore in 2003

While at Southwest Texas State University, she joined roots-rock-Latin group the Humblebums, opening in 1999 for the Scabs featuring frontman Bob Schneider at Antone's Blues Club, and was later recruited by Liquid Stereo Project, a seven-piece hip hop/jazz fusion band for which Choffel became the primary songwriter, exploring different rhythmic phrasing, rapping, and recording. After two years she transferred to College of Santa Fe (now Santa Fe University of Art and Design) to study contemporary music, and frequently participated in hip hop freestyles on campus, performing with rapper Ben Haggerty early in his career as Professor Macklemore.

== Music career ==
Choffel returned to Austin in 2003 to pursue music as a career and developed a hybrid musical style by mixing pop, soul, jazz, and world elements. After an immersive trip to Brazil in 2004, she recorded and released her debut album Shudders & Rings in 2006. The album yielded the regional hit "Hey Mister," which was licensed for inclusion on the 2008 Austin Music Vol. 7 Compilation CD also featuring Trish Murphy and Will Sexton, and timed to coincide with a U.S. tour, her first as a bandleader."Hey Mister" placed 2nd in the International Songwriting Competition AAA category that year.

In November 2008, Choffel was featured on the cover of The Austin Chronicle headlined "The Next Fun Fearless Female Rock Star," a reference to her semi-finalist finish in Cosmopolitan's StarLaunch™ campaign, following her Grand Prize win in the Nationwide FameCast Competition. She was awarded "Best Indie Band" at the 2009 Austin Music Awards, where she headlined the official kick-off show at the annual South by Southwest music festival. Chicago Sun-Times critic Jim DeRogatis wrote that Choffel "impressed me more than any I've heard here with a unique sound equal parts Beat poetry, smoky soul grooves and indie-pop eccentricity. Think Feist meets Erykah Badu, with a hint of Tex-Mex seasoning."

Choffel played the CMJ Music Marathon in 2008, South By Southwest (2009–2012), and Voodoo Experience festival in 2009.

In late 2009 Choffel began working with producer Danny Reisch (White Denim, Bright Light Social Hour) on her second album after her recording of the song "Archer" was picked up by Dell for a Windows 7 commercial. Choffel released the album Steady Eye Shaky Bow independently in 2011. Guest artists include Davíd Garza, Michael Kingcaid, Brad Houser, and Big Sam's Funky Nation lending horns on the album's single, "Raincloud," which got regional promotion. The album garnered critical acclaim for its innovative blend of genres and Choffel's commanding voice. Michael Corcoran of the Austin American-Statesman called it "a record of shimmering soul and percussive mental massage that demands to be played start to finish".

Choffel appeared at Austin City Limits Music Festival in 2011, and toured extensively to promote the album, including U.S. tours with Jacob Jeffries Band in 2012 and Wakey!Wakey! in early 2013. In February 2013, she shared a bill with Emeli Sandé and Skylar Grey at the Key Club Los Angeles.

In 2012 the track "Stumble" was awarded 3rd place in the International Songwriting Competition performance category. Steady Eye Shaky Bow won Best Album in the 2012 Independent Music Awards singer-songwriter category. Choffel re-released the album, renamed Archer, with "Golden Fires" as a bonus track, internationally on Red Parlor Records in 2013. She toured France in early 2014 to positive reviews.

In June 2014, Choffel joined the band Spanish Gold as a keyboardist and backup singer for the remainder of the band's national tour.

After releasing her album, Hello Goodbye, in 2017, Choffel moved back to Austin to settle down and start a family. She currently hosts a daily radio slot for alternative radio station Sun Radio in what she describes on the station's website as, "the greatest day job ever".

== Film and TV ==
=== Catfish ===
A YouTube video of Choffel performing the Jimmie Driftwood song "Tennessee Stud" appeared in the 2010 film Catfish, as an audio "rip" that triggers a pivotal plot twist in the film. Choffel learned of her involvement when the documentary was released, but she had deleted the original video—which was online in 2009 for only 48 hours—from YouTube. She posted a re-recording soon after the film's release.

=== The Voice ===
In 2012, Choffel auditioned for the third season of NBC's The Voice. She won a spot on Blake Shelton's team after performing Fleetwood Mac's "Landslide" and being selected by both Adam Levine and Shelton. She then defeated Lelia Broussard in their duet of "Dog Days Are Over" in the "battle rounds". Choffel exited the program with a rendition of Bob Marley's "Could You Be Loved" in a "knockout round" to Cassadee Pope.

In a season recap, Rolling Stone singled out Choffel's performance, calling her "more powerful than even some of the top-notch pop belters". Choffel herself said, "I was definitely the wild card of the show, doing folk, pop, and reggae, and that may have hurt me in the end, but it's who I am."

== Discography ==
Name	Label	Year
Shudders & Rings	Middlebitty Records	2006
Steady Eye Shaky Bow	Middlebitty Records	2011
"Golden Fires" (Video single)		2011
"Landslide" (Commercial single)	Universal Republic Records	2012
"Dog Days Are Over" (Commercial single)	Universal Republic Records	2012
Archer	Red Parlor Records	2013
Hello Goodbye	Middlebitty Music	2017
Bird by Bird	Middlebitty Music	2024

== Awards and nominations ==
Year	Association	Category	Result
2008	International Songwriting Competition	AAA – "Hey Mister"	2nd Place
2012	International Songwriting Competition	Performance – "Stumble"	3rd Place
2012	Independent Music Awards	Singer-Songwriter Album – Steady Eye Shaky Bow	Best Album
2012	Independent Music Awards	Singer-Songwriter Song – "Golden Fires"	Nominated
