= Bryan Keith (singer) =

American singer

- Born: Bryan Keith
- Genres: Rock, Pop
- Occupation: Musician
- Instruments: Guitar, Vocals

Bryan Keith is an American singer based in New York City. His father is a two-time Grammy-winning artist.

== The Voice ==
Bryan Keith was a contestant on the third season of The Voice, and came in at third place on Adam Levine's team. All four coaches, Adam Levine, Cee Lo Green, Christina Aguilera, and Blake Shelton, pushed their I WANT YOU buttons. Bryan elected to join Team Adam.

| Episode | Round | Song | Result |
| 1 | Blind Auditions | "It Will Rain" | Safe |
| 10 | Battle Rounds | "Santeria" | Safe |
| 16 | Knockout Rounds | "Everything I Do (I Do It For You)" | Safe |
| 18 | Life Playoffs | "Iris" | Safe |
| 21 | Top 12 Perform | "Back to Black" | Safe |
| 23 | Top 10 Perform | "New York State of Mind" | Eliminated |
