= Avery Wilson =

American singer, songwriter and dancer (born 1995)

- Avery Wilson performing at the 2026 Knicks championship ceremony in Manhattan

Background information
- Born: Branden Avery Wilson; July 18, 1995 (age 31); Hamden, Connecticut, US
- Genres: R&B; pop; dance
- Occupations: Singer; songwriter; dancer; actor
- Instruments: Vocals; Guitar; Piano
- Years active: 2012–present
- Label: RCA Records
- Website: averywilson.com

Avery Wilson (born July 18, 1995) is an American singer, songwriter, dancer and actor. Wilson first gained notice as a contestant on season 3 of The Voice. In 2015, he released "If I Have To", the first single from his debut album, which reached the top twenty on the Billboard Hot R&B Songs chart. He later starred in the 2024 revival of The Wiz on Broadway as the Scarecrow, which earned him a Grammy Award nomination for Grammy Award for Best Musical Theater Album for its accompanying soundtrack.

== Early life and education ==
Wilson never saw himself as a singer until his father overheard him singing and recognized the talent. His father began holding open mic nights at one of the 14 area McDonald's that he oversaw as the director of operations. The open mic nights were to help the local community have a safe place to have fun and also showcase his son's talent. Wilson was 9 years old at the time and still returns to the location to help with the event.

Wilson was raised in Hamden, Connecticut, where he attended Hamden Middle School. He attended Cooperative Arts and Humanities High School located in New Haven, Connecticut.

== Career ==
One of Wilson's first singles, "Ringtone", was a demo that was sent to radio station WYBC-FM in New Haven, CT. The demo was sent in by his father and it received airplay, becoming a hit in the regional market of Connecticut, New York, and Massachusetts. Wilson was first discovered by Sean Garrett who began working with him. He entered the Next Teen Superstar competition in New York in 2011 and was the co-winner of the competition. In 2012 he self-released On Top of the World.

Wilson appeared on season 3 of The Voice when he was 16 years old. He performed on team Cee Lo Green and made it to the knockouts. Wilson was a favorite to win the competition but was eliminated on October 29, 2012, after his performance of "Yeah 3x". His elimination was called a major upset by numerous publications, and he later signed with Clive Davis and RCA Records. He returned to The Voice Season 8 in 2015 to sing If I Have To, the first single from his debut album. Wilson later announced that he would perform at the BET Awards in 2015 on June 28, 2015.

On October 29, 2018, Avery released his new 5-song project called FYI onto mainstream. The song "Dollar Bill" was released as his first single. The song expressed the meaning of "not putting up with bullshit." He released his second single, "Wass the Move", which had a hip-hop feel to it. Avery's other three tracks included "Do For You", "Use 2", and "Touch Down".

In 2019, Avery released a 4-song project called 8:34.

In 2024, Avery became a cast member of the Broadway show The Wiz as the Scarecrow.

== Personal life ==
Wilson came out as bisexual in a tweet on his 25th birthday on July 18, 2020.

== Discography ==
=== Studio albums ===
List of studio albums, with selected details
Title	Album details
On Top of the World	Released: August 14, 2012; Label: Self-released; Format: Digital download, streaming

=== Extended plays ===
List of extended plays, with selected details
Title	Extended play details
FYI	Released: October 26, 2018; Label: Self-released; Format: Digital download, streaming
8:34	Released: June 20, 2019; Label: Self-released; Format: Digital download, streaming

=== Singles ===
List of singles, with selected chart positions, showing year released and album name
Title	Year	Peak chart positions			Album
Title	Year	US R&B	US AC	US AR&B	Album
"If I Have To"	2015	18	21	24	Non-album singles
"Change My Mind" (featuring Migos)	2015	—	—	—	Non-album singles
"Song for You"	2017	—	—	—	Non-album singles
"Callin'"	2019	—	—	—	8:34
"Smoke"	2020	—	—	—	Non-album singles
"What I Like" (with Kenyon Dixon)	2020	—	—	—	Non-album singles
"Kiss the Sky"	2024	—	—	16	Non-album singles
