= The Voice (American TV series) season 3 =

The Voice
- Season 3
- Promotional poster featuring coaches Levine, Green, Aguilera, Shelton, and host Daly
- Hosted by: Carson Daly; Christina Milian (social media)
- Coaches: Adam Levine; CeeLo Green; Christina Aguilera; Blake Shelton
- No. of contestants: 64 artists
- Winner: Cassadee Pope
- Winning coach: Blake Shelton
- Runner-up: Terry McDermott

Release
- Original network: NBC
- Original release: September 10 – December 18, 2012

Season chronology
- ← Previous; Season 2 Next → Season 4

The third season of the American reality talent show The Voice premiered on September 10, 2012, on NBC. NBC officially announced The Voice's renewal on May 13, 2012, during its 2012–13 upfront presentation, with the show returning as a fall series. Blake Shelton, Christina Aguilera, Adam Levine and CeeLo Green continued as coaches.

Season three introduced Steals during the Battle rounds in which other coaches can save a losing artist to join them to their team and reinstating them in the competition. It was initially enacted during the Battle rounds, but would later extended to Knockout rounds (also introduced this season) from season 5 onwards.

This is the first season to introduce a revamp of the competition during the live shows adapting to a format similar to The X Factor, where eliminations now apply to any artists disregarding to the team's affiliation, and the iTunes bonus multiplier where it was awarded a tenfold of votes (fivefold as of season five) to certain artists if their recorded single peaked at a certain position at the close of the voting window. This is also the first time in the show's history a reduced three artists represented in the finale, thus making it the first season not all of the coaches would guarantee to represent an artist in the finale. This is one of nine seasons where the team size was not 12, but with a size of 16 (The inaugural season was the first with a size of eight members; seasons 18 through 20, season 23 and season 25 had 10 members; and seasons 22, 24, and the current 26th had 14 members instead of the traditional 12).

Cassadee Pope was named the winner of the season, making her the first female winner of The Voice. marking Blake Shelton's second win as a coach, and the first coach to win multiple (and consecutive) seasons. She also the first winner who had the performance montaged (battle round).

== Auditions, coaches, and hosts ==
Auditions for were held on July 7 to August 12, 2012, in Memphis, Minneapolis, New York, Dallas and Los Angeles.

All original coaches signed on for season three. Mary J. Blige, Michael Bublé, Rob Thomas, and Billie Joe Armstrong joined the show as advisers for Adam Levine, Blake Shelton, CeeLo Green, and Christina Aguilera's teams respectively during the Battle Rounds segment of the show. Christina, Blake, and Cee Lo brought in Ron Fair, Scott Hendricks, and Jennifer Hudson respectively to help coach in the episode, Top 10 Perform Live. Cee Lo brought in Bill Withers to coach Nicholas David the following week, and was sick during rehearsals for the subsequent week, so he brought in Pat Monahan, lead singer for Train, to coach all his artists that week, while still choosing his team members' songs and keeping in touch with them on the phone.

Coaches and Host(s) of The Voice Season 3

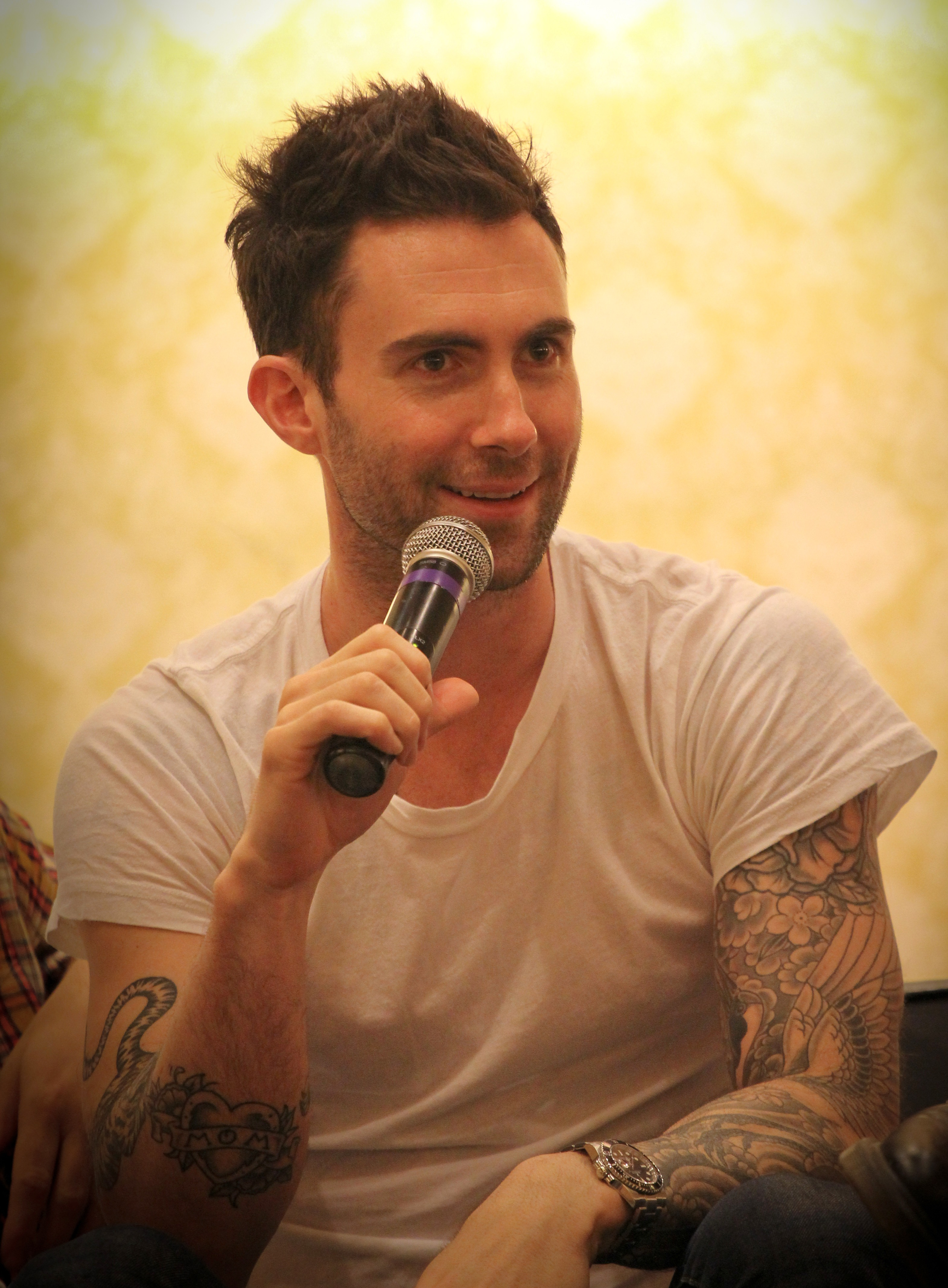
Adam Levine

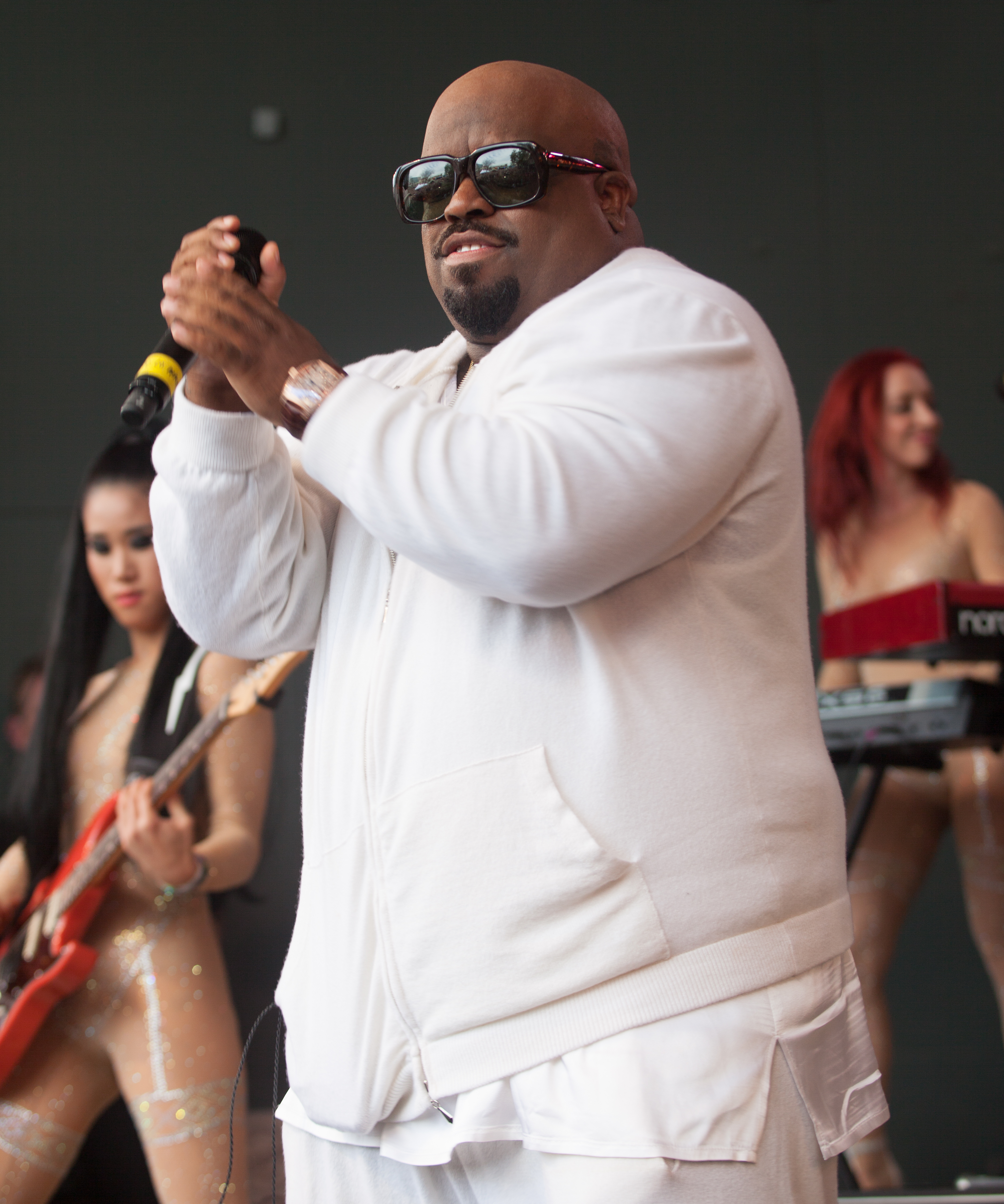
CeeLo Green

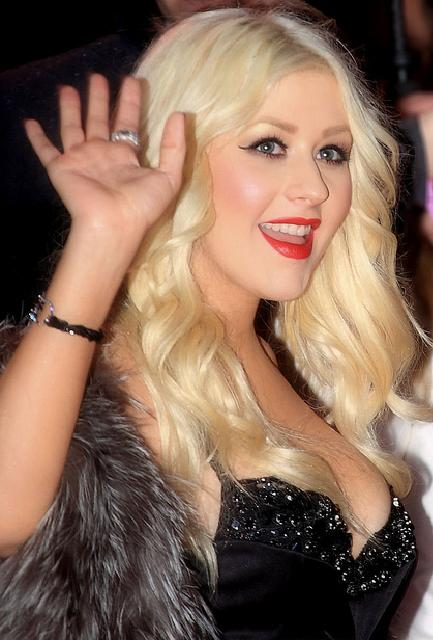
Christina Aguilera

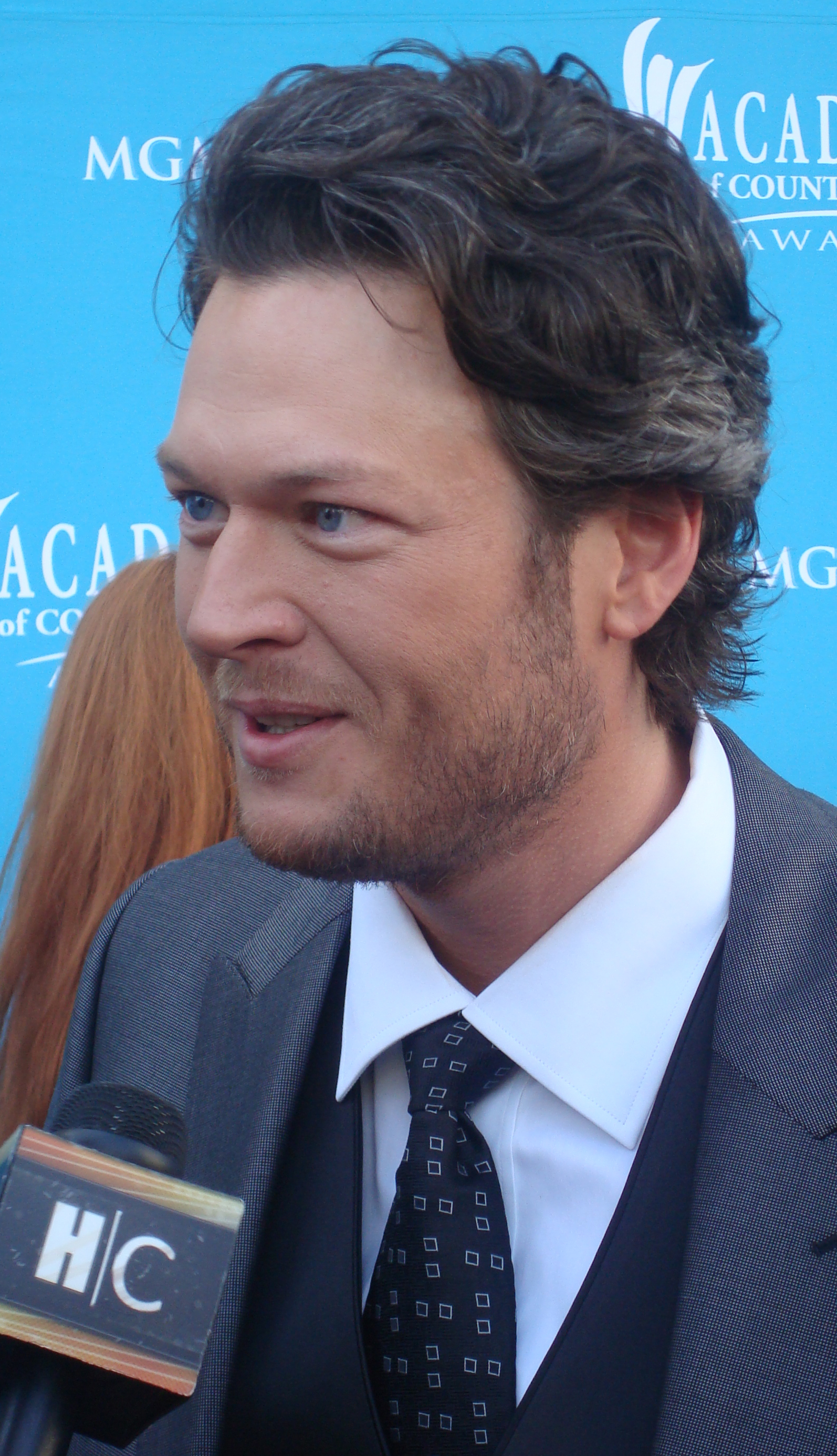
Blake Shelton

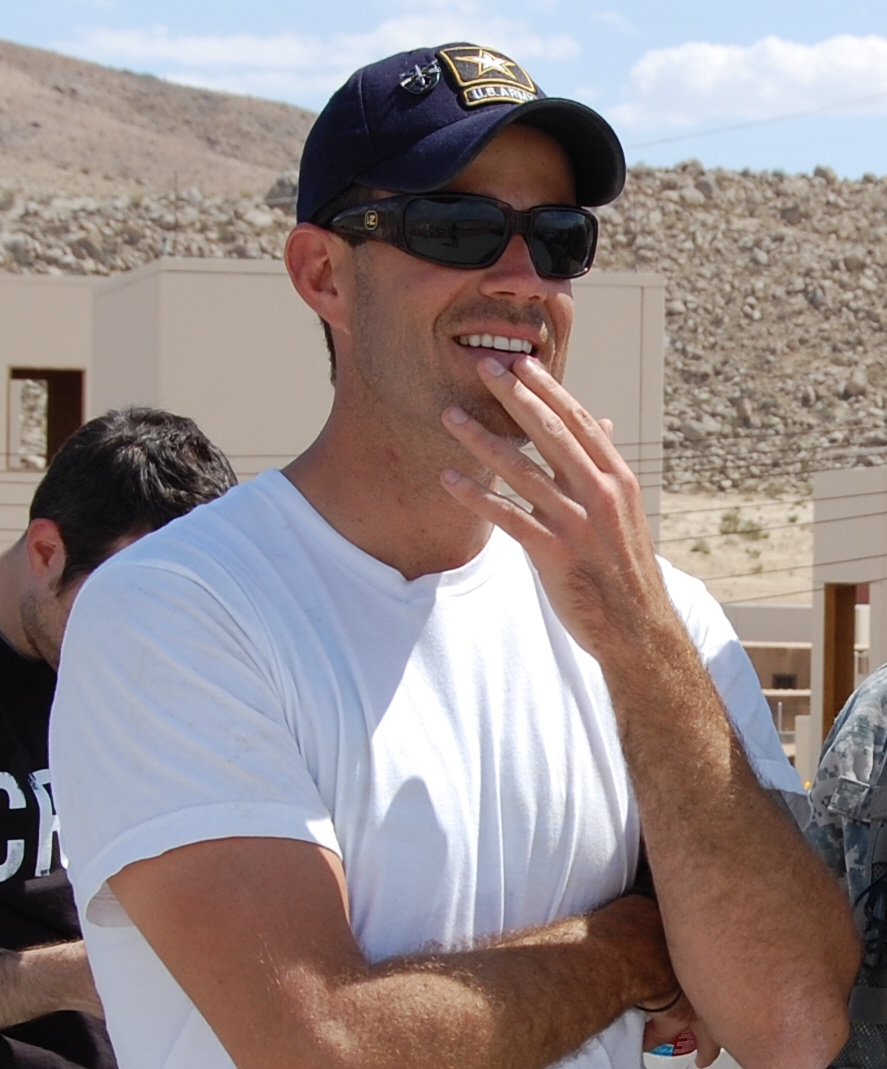
Carson Daly (Host)

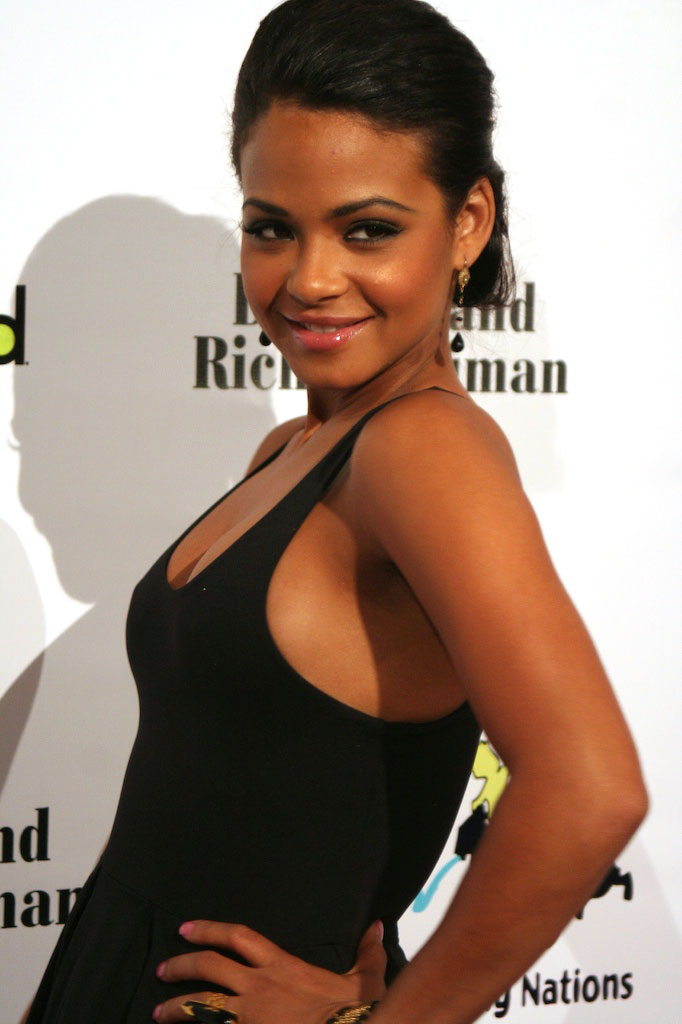
Christina Milian (Backstage)

== Teams ==
Color key

- Winner
- Runner-up
- Third place
- Eliminated in the Live shows
- Eliminated in the Live playoffs
- Eliminated in the Knockout rounds
- Artist was stolen by another coach
- Eliminated in the Battle rounds

Coaches	Top 64 artists				
Adam Levine					
Adam Levine	Amanda Brown	Melanie Martinez	Bryan Keith	Loren Allred	Joselyn Rivera
Adam Levine	Sam James	Joe Kirkland	Nicole Nelson	Kayla Nevarez	Michelle Brooks-Thompson
Adam Levine	~~Alessandra Guercio~~	~~Collin McLoughlin~~	~~Caitlin Michele~~	Benji Kuriakose	Adanna Duru
Adam Levine	Brandon Mahone	Samuel Mouton	Brian Scartocci		
CeeLo Green					
CeeLo Green	Nicholas David	Trevin Hunte	Cody Belew	MacKenzie Bourg	Diego Val
CeeLo Green	Terisa Griffin	Caitlin Michele	Daniel Rosa	Mycle Wastman	Avery Wilson
CeeLo Green	~~Chevonne~~	~~Amanda Brown~~	JR Aquino	Dominique Rosario	Emily Earle
CeeLo Green	Todd Kessler	Alexis Marceaux	Ben Taub		
Christina Aguilera					
Christina Aguilera	Dez Duron	Sylvia Yacoub	Adriana Louise	De'Borah Garner	Devyn DeLoera
Christina Aguilera	Aquile Gunby	Chevonne Lauren-ianuzzi	Alessandra Guercio	Laura Vivas	Celica Westbrook
Christina Aguilera	~~MarissaAnne~~	~~Joselyn Rivera~~	Beat Frequency	Nathalie Hernandez	Nelly's Echo
Christina Aguilera	Paulina Cerrilla	Jordan Pruitt	Lisa Scinta		
Blake Shelton					
Blake Shelton	Cassadee Pope	Terry McDermott	Michaela Paige	Julio Cesar Castillo	Liz Davis
Blake Shelton	Suzanna Choffel	Gracia Harrison	MarissaAnne Rizzitello	Collin McLoughlin	Rudy Parris
Blake Shelton	~~Terisa Griffin~~	2Steel Girls	Lelia Broussard	Kelly Crapa	Ryan Jirovec
Blake Shelton	Nicole Johnson	Casey Muessigmann	Charlie Rey		
Note: Italicized names are stolen artists (names struck through within former teams).

== Blind auditions ==
Color key

✔	Coach hit his/her "I WANT YOU" button
	Artist defaulted to this coach's team
	Artist selected to join this coach's team
	Artist eliminated with no coach pressing his or her "I WANT YOU" button

=== Episode 1 (Sept. 10) ===
The coaches performed "Start Me Up" at the start of the show.

Order	Artist	Age	Hometown	Song	Coach's and artist's choices			
Order	Artist	Age	Hometown	Song	Adam	CeeLo	Christina	Blake
1	Terry McDermott	35	Aberdeen, Scotland	"Baba O'Riley"	✔	✔	—	✔
2	De'Borah	25	Chicago Heights, Illinois	"Hey, Soul Sister"	—	✔	✔	—
3	Gracia Harrison	18	Virden, Illinois	"I Want to Be a Cowboy's Sweetheart"	✔	✔	—	✔
4	Garrett Gardner	16	Ringwood, New Jersey	"Have You Ever Seen the Rain?"	—	—	—	—
5	Devyn DeLoera	20	Snyder, Texas	"Ain't No Other Man"	✔	—	✔	✔
6	Bryan Keith	22	New York City, New York	"It Will Rain"	✔	✔	✔	✔
7	Daniel Rosa	21	Riverside, California	"Somebody That I Used to Know"	—	✔	—	✔
8	Anita Antoinette	22	Boston, Massachusetts / Kingston, Jamaica	"No Woman, No Cry"	—	—	—	—
9	Joe Kirkland	24	Fort Worth, Texas	"Gives You Hell"	✔	—	—	✔
10	Jessica Sharpe	23	Greensboro, North Carolina	"Son of a Preacher Man"	—	—	—	—
11	Danny Hunter Jones	N/A	Los Angeles, California	"Superstition"	—	—	—	—
12	Jamie Pickett	N/A	New York City, New York	"Love on Top"	—	—	—	—
13	Odiseas Georgiadis	15	New York City, New York	"The Lazy Song"	—	—	—	—
14	Trevin Hunte	18	New York City, New York	"Listen"	—	✔	✔	✔

=== Episode 2 (Sept. 11) ===
Order	Artist	Age	Hometown	Song	Coach's and artist's choices			
Order	Artist	Age	Hometown	Song	Adam	CeeLo	Christina	Blake
1	Adriana Louise	22	New York City, New York	"Domino"	✔	✔	✔	✔
2	Casey Muessigmann	22	Spencer, Iowa	"Sweet Home Alabama"	—	✔	—	✔
3	Aquile	24	San Diego, California	"Your Song"	✔	✔	✔	—
4	Ryan Fogarty	28	Nashville, Tennessee	"Tomorrow"	—	—	—	—
5	Brett Hite	N/A	Spokane, Washington	"Replay"	—	—	—	—
6	Jamie Lampert	N/A	Chicago, Illinois	"Poker Face"	—	—	—	—
7	Matt Carr	N/A	Hanover, New Hampshire/Boston, Massachusetts	"(Sittin' On) The Dock of the Bay"	—	—	—	—
8	MacKenzie Bourg	19	Lafayette, Louisiana	"Pumped Up Kicks"	—	✔	—	—
9	Julio Cesar Castillo	21	Chicago, Illinois	"La Bamba"	—	✔	—	✔

=== Episode 3 (Sept. 12) ===
Order	Artist	Age	Hometown	Song	Coach's and artist's choices			
Order	Artist	Age	Hometown	Song	Adam	CeeLo	Christina	Blake
1	Samuel Mouton	19	Fort Collins, Colorado	"Redemption Song"	✔	✔	✔	—
2	Chris Trousdale	26	Big Rapids, Michigan / New Port Richey, Florida	"Glad You Came"	—	—	—	—
3	Mike Squillanté	N/A	Boston, Massachusetts	"Everybody Talks"	—	—	—	—
4	Jasmin Rose	N/A	N/A	"Mercy"	—	—	—	—
5	Brandon Clark	N/A	Atlanta, Georgia	"Colder Weather"	—	—	—	—
6	Nelly's Echo	32	Lagos, Nigeria/Baltimore, Maryland	"Ain't No Sunshine"	✔	—	✔	—
7	2Steel Girls (Krystal and Allison Steel)	23 & 44	Nashville, Tennessee	"Before He Cheats"	—	✔	—	✔
8	Lisa Scinta	26	Las Vegas, Nevada	"Teenage Dream"	—	✔	✔	—
9	MarissaAnne	15	Long Island, New York	"Part of Me"	—	✔	✔	—
10	Loren Allred	22	Salt Lake City, Utah/Pittsburgh, Pennsylvania	"When Love Takes Over"	✔	✔	—	—
11	DOMO	26	New York City, New York	"Don't Cha"	—	✔	—	—
12	Nicole Nelson	34	Burlington, Vermont	"Hallelujah"	✔	✔	✔	✔

=== Episode 4 (Sept. 17) ===
A preview of Christina Aguilera's video for Your Body was televised.

Order	Artist	Age	Hometown	Song	Coach's and artist's choices			
Order	Artist	Age	Hometown	Song	Adam	CeeLo	Christina	Blake
1	Melanie Martinez	17	Astoria, New York City, New York	"Toxic"	✔	✔	—	✔
2	Cupid	29	Lafayette, Louisiana	"Cupid Shuffle"	—	—	—	—
3	Brian Scartocci	26	Austin, Texas	"Isn't She Lovely"	✔	✔	—	✔
4	VanJess	19 & 20	Lagos, Nigeria /Rancho Cucamonga, California	"Work Out"	—	—	—	—
5	Maddie and Julia	N/A	Scotch Plains, New Jersey/New Paltz, New York	"Disturbia"	—	—	—	—
6	The Wadsworth Sisters	N/A	Philadelphia, Pennsylvania	"Edge of Seventeen"	—	—	—	—
7	Beat Frequency (Shawn Lewis and Natasha Neuschwander)	35 & 28	Vancouver, Washington	"E.T."	—	—	✔	—
8	Tyler Lillestol	23	Riverside, California	"U Got It Bad"	—	—	—	—
9	Liz Davis	25	Madison, Mississippi	"Here for the Party"	✔	—	✔	✔
10	JR Aquino	24	Anchorage, Alaska	"Just the Way You Are"	✔	✔	✔	—
11	Agina Alvarez	22	San Diego, California	"Turn the Beat Around"	—	—	—	—
12	Nicholas David	31	Saint Paul, Minnesota	"Stand By Me"	—	✔	—	—
13	Alessandra Guercio	17	New York City, New York	"The Climb"	✔	✔	—	—
14	Adanna Duru	15	Walnut, California	"The Edge of Glory"	✔	—	—	—
15	Kelly Crapa	15	New Fairfield, Connecticut	"Sparks Fly"	—	—	—	✔
16	Paulina	16	Los Angeles, California	"You Make Me Feel..."	—	—	✔	—
17	Avery Wilson	16	Hamden, Connecticut	"Without You"	✔	✔	✔	✔

=== Episode 5 (Sept. 18) ===
Order	Artist	Age	Hometown	Song	Coach's and artist's choices			
Order	Artist	Age	Hometown	Song	Adam	CeeLo	Christina	Blake
1	Trevanne Howell	33	New York City, New York	"I Have Nothing"	—	—	—	—
2	Collin McLoughlin	24	Bedford, New York	"Wild World"	✔	✔	—	✔
3	Joselyn Rivera	17	Pembroke Pines, Florida	"Stronger (What Doesn't Kill You)"	—	—	✔	✔
4	Benji	24	Orlando, Florida	"Knockin' on Heaven's Door"	✔	✔	—	—
5	Todd Kessler	30	Chicago, Illinois	"Maggie May"	—	✔	—	—
6	Ben Taub	21	Princeton, New Jersey	"Feeling Good"	—	✔	—	✔
7	Emily Earle	23	New York City, New York	"Ring of Fire"	—	✔	—	—
8	Lorraine Ferro	52	New York City, New York	"Skyscraper"	—	—	—	—
9	Mycle Wastman	40	Seattle, Washington	"Let's Stay Together"	✔	✔	—	✔

=== Episode 6 (Sept. 24) ===
Order	Artist	Age	Hometown	Song	Coach's and artist's choices			
Order	Artist	Age	Hometown	Song	Adam	CeeLo	Christina	Blake
1	Michelle Brooks-Thompson	28	Sunderland, Massachusetts	"Proud Mary"	✔	✔	✔	—
2	Diego Val	25	Lima, Peru /Miami, Florida	"Animal"	—	✔	—	—
3	Lauren Brooke	24	Pawling, New York	"Cowboy Casanova"	—	—	—	—
4	Suzanna Choffel	32	Austin, Texas	"Landslide"	✔	—	—	✔
5	Michaela Paige	16	Boca Raton, Florida	"Sober"	—	—	—	✔
6	Ryan Jirovec	28	McAllen, Texas	"Amazed"	—	—	—	✔
7	Dez Duron	22	Shreveport, Louisiana	"Sara Smile"	—	✔	✔	✔
8	VJ Rosales	25	Bellflower, California	"Forget You"	—	—	—	—
9	Alexis Marceaux	23	New Orleans, Louisiana	"Go Your Own Way"	—	✔	—	—
10	Sam James	26	Worcester, Massachusetts	"Imagine"	✔	—	—	—
11	Laura Vivas	33	West Palm Beach, Florida	"Whataya Want From Me"	—	—	✔	—
12	Lelia Broussard	23	Los Angeles, California	"We Can Work It Out"	—	—	—	✔
13	Brandon Mahone	17	Chicago, Illinois/Indiana	"I Wish It Would Rain"	✔	✔	✔	—
14	Jeffrey James	25	Brownsburg, Indiana	"A Little Less Conversation"	—	—	—	—
15	Paige Bryan	26	Los Angeles, California	"You Keep Me Hangin' On"	—	—	—	—
16	Cameron Hovsepian	N/A	Los Angeles, California	"I Need a Dollar"	—	—	—	—
17	LaRae Rhodes	N/A	N/A	"Black Horse and the Cherry Tree"	—	—	—	—
18	Jordan Pruitt	21	Loganville, Georgia	"The One That Got Away"	—	—	✔	—
19	Terisa Griffin	42	Chicago, Illinois	"Someone Like You"	—	—	✔	✔

=== Episode 7 (Sept. 25) ===
Order	Artist	Age	Hometown	Song	Coach's and artist's choices			
Order	Artist	Age	Hometown	Song	Adam	CeeLo	Christina	Blake
1	Sylvia Yacoub	19	Alexandria, Egypt /Muskegon, Michigan	"Only Girl (In the World)"	—	✔	✔	✔
2	IJ Quinn	25	Warsaw, North Carolina	"Virtual Insanity"	—	—	—	—
3	Charlie Rey	21	Long Beach, California	"Home"	✔	—	—	✔
4	Amanda Brown	27	New York City, New York	"Valerie"	—	✔	—	—
5	Yolanda Barber	55	Pittsburgh, Pennsylvania	"Get Here"	—	—	—	—
6	Cassadee Pope	23	West Palm Beach, Florida	"Torn"	✔	✔	✔	✔

=== Episode 8 (Oct. 1) ===
Order	Artist	Age	Hometown	Song	Coach's and artist's choices			
Order	Artist	Age	Hometown	Song	Adam	CeeLo	Christina	Blake
1	Nathalie Hernandez	15	Dunedin, Florida	"White Horse"	✔	—	✔	✔
2	Rod Michael	26	Allentown, Pennsylvania/Atlanta, Georgia	"Please Don't Go"	—	—	—	—
3	Caitlin Michele	20	Boston, Massachusetts	"Cosmic Love"	✔	—	—	✔
4	Nicole Johnson	18	Denham Springs, Louisiana/Nashville, Tennessee	"Mr. Know It All"	—	✔	—	✔
5	Kameron Corvet	32	Cincinnati, Ohio/Atlanta, Georgia	"Crazy"	—	—	—	—
6	Chevonne	26	Little Falls, New Jersey	"Brass in Pocket"	—	✔	—	✔
7	Kayla Nevarez	17	Mission Viejo, California	"American Boy"	✔	✔	✔	—
8	Celica Westbrook	16	Franklin, Tennessee	"A Thousand Years"	Team full	✔	✔	✔
9	Jay Taylor	N/A	Duette, Florida/Nashville, Tennessee	"Country Girl (Shake It for Me)"	Team full	—	Team full	—
10	Gedina	N/A	N/A	"Ain't Nobody"	Team full	—	Team full	—
11	Taylor Wagner	N/A	Mattoon, Illinois/Nashville, Tennessee	"Mean"	Team full	—	Team full	—
12	Jessica Cayne	26	Grayson, Georgia	"Good Girl"	Team full	—	Team full	—
13	Rudy Parris	46	Visalia, California	"Every Breath You Take"	Team full	✔	Team full	✔
14	Cody Belew	27	Beebe, Arkansas	"Hard to Handle"	Team full	✔	Team full	Team full

=== Episode 9: The Best of the Blind Auditions (Oct. 2) ===
Episode 9 featured a clip show recapping some of the highlights of the blind auditions, along with the preview of the Battle rounds.

== The Battles ==
The Battle Rounds were broadcast from Monday, October 8 to Tuesday, October 23. In a history first for The Voice, 'Steals' were introduced this season, where each coach could steal any two defeated artists from another team by pressing the button on their chairs; similar to the Blind Auditions, if the event multiple coaches decide to steal, the artist was given a choice to choose which team they want to join, and only the coach which was successfully joined counts as a "steal". The advisors for these episodes are: Mary J. Blige working with Adam Levine; Michael Bublé working with Blake Shelton; Rob Thomas (Matchbox Twenty) working with Cee Lo Green; and Billie Joe Armstrong (Green Day) working with Christina Aguilera.

Color key

Artist won the Battle and advances to the Knockouts
Artist lost the Battle but advanced to the Knockouts after being stolen by another coach
Artist lost the Battle and was eliminated

Episode	Coach	Order	Winner	Song	Loser	'Steal' result			
Episode	Coach	Order	Winner	Song	Loser	Adam	CeeLo	Christina	Blake
Episode 10 (Monday, Oct. 8, 2012)	Blake Shelton	1	Terry McDermott	"Carry On Wayward Son"	Casey Muessigmann	—	—	—	—N/a
Episode 10 (Monday, Oct. 8, 2012)	Adam Levine	2	Bryan Keith	"Santeria"	Collin McLoughlin	—N/a	✔	—	✔
Episode 10 (Monday, Oct. 8, 2012)	Cee Lo Green	3	Diego Val	"Jessie's Girl"	JR Aquino	—	—N/a	—	—
Episode 10 (Monday, Oct. 8, 2012)	Christina Aguilera	4	De'Borah	"Message in a Bottle"	Nelly's Echo	—	—	—N/a	—
Episode 10 (Monday, Oct. 8, 2012)	Blake Shelton	5	Gracia Harrison	"Sin Wagon"	2Steel Girls	—	—	—	—N/a
Episode 10 (Monday, Oct. 8, 2012)	CeeLo Green	6	Trevin Hunte	"Vision of Love"	Amanda Brown	✔	—N/a	✔	✔
Episode 11 (Tuesday, Oct. 9, 2012)	CeeLo Green	1	Cody Belew	"Telephone"	DOMO	—	—N/a	—	—
Episode 11 (Tuesday, Oct. 9, 2012)	Christina Aguilera	2	Aquile	"You Give Me Something"	Nathalie Hernandez	—	—	—N/a	—
Episode 11 (Tuesday, Oct. 9, 2012)	Christina Aguilera	3	Celica Westbrook	"My Life Would Suck Without You"	Lisa Scinta	—	—	—N/a	—
Episode 11 (Tuesday, Oct. 9, 2012)	Blake Shelton	4	Rudy Parris	"Bad Day"	Charlie Rey	—	—	—	—N/a
Episode 11 (Tuesday, Oct. 9, 2012)	Adam Levine	5	Melanie Martinez	"Lights"	Caitlin Michele	—N/a	✔	—	✔
Episode 12 (Monday, Oct. 15, 2012)	Blake Shelton	1	Julio Cesar Castillo	"Conga"	Terisa Griffin	—	✔	—	—N/a
Episode 12 (Monday, Oct. 15, 2012)	Christina Aguilera	2	Dez Duron	"Just the Way You Are"	Paulina	—	Team full	—N/a	—
Episode 12 (Monday, Oct. 15, 2012)	Adam Levine	3	Sam James	"You Give Love a Bad Name"	Benji	—N/a	Team full	—	—
Episode 12 (Monday, Oct. 15, 2012)	CeeLo Green	4	Nicholas David	"She's Gone"	Todd Kessler	—	Team full	—	—
Episode 12 (Monday, Oct. 15, 2012)	Blake Shelton	5	Suzanna Choffel	"Dog Days Are Over"	Lelia Broussard	—	Team full	—	—N/a
Episode 12 (Monday, Oct. 15, 2012)	Christina Aguilera	6	Sylvia Yacoub	"Best Thing I Never Had"	Joselyn Rivera	✔	Team full	—N/a	✔
Episode 13 (Tuesday, Oct. 16, 2012)	Blake Shelton	1	Liz Davis	"Baggage Claim"	Nicole Johnson	Team full	Team full	—	—N/a
Episode 13 (Tuesday, Oct. 16, 2012)	Adam Levine	2	Kayla Nevarez	"Wide Awake"	Alessandra Guercio	Team full	Team full	✔	—
Episode 13 (Tuesday, Oct. 16, 2012)	CeeLo Green	3	Mycle Wastman	"Too Close"	Ben Taub	Team full	Team full	—	—
Episode 13 (Tuesday, Oct. 16, 2012)	Adam Levine	4	Michelle Brooks-Thompson	"Crazy in Love"	Adanna Duru	Team full	Team full	—	—
Episode 13 (Tuesday, Oct. 16, 2012)	Christina Aguilera	5	Laura Vivas	"Poker Face"	Beat Frequency	Team full	Team full	—N/a	—
Episode 13 (Tuesday, Oct. 16, 2012)	CeeLo Green	6	MacKenzie Bourg	"Good Time"	Emily Earle	Team full	Team full	—	—
Episode 14 (Monday, Oct. 22, 2012)	CeeLo Green	1	Daniel Rosa	"Whataya Want from Me"	Alexis Marceaux	Team full	Team full	—	—
Episode 14 (Monday, Oct. 22, 2012)	Adam Levine	2	Nicole Nelson	"Ain't No Mountain High Enough"	Brandon Mahone	Team full	Team full	—	—
Episode 14 (Monday, Oct. 22, 2012)	Adam Levine	3	Loren Allred	"Need You Now"	Brian Scartocci	Team full	Team full	—	—
Episode 14 (Monday, Oct. 22, 2012)	Blake Shelton	4	Cassadee Pope	"Not Over You"	Ryan Jirovec	Team full	Team full	—	—N/a
Episode 14 (Monday, Oct. 22, 2012)	Adam Levine	5	Joe Kirkland	"You Get What You Give"	Samuel Mouton	Team full	Team full	—	—
Episode 14 (Monday, Oct. 22, 2012)	Christina Aguilera	6	Devyn DeLoera	"Free Your Mind"	MarissaAnne	Team full	Team full	—N/a	✔
Episode 15 (Tuesday, Oct. 23, 2012)	Christina Aguilera	1	Adriana Louise	"Hot n Cold"	Jordan Pruitt	Team full	Team full	—N/a	Team full
Episode 15 (Tuesday, Oct. 23, 2012)	Blake Shelton	2	Michaela Paige	"I Hate Myself for Loving You"	Kelly Crapa	Team full	Team full	—	Team full
Episode 15 (Tuesday, Oct. 23, 2012)	CeeLo Green	3	Avery Wilson	"Titanium"	Chevonne	Team full	Team full	✔	Team full

== The Knockouts ==
The Knockouts were broadcast from Monday, October 29 to Tuesday, October 30.

After the Battle Round, each coach had 10 contestants for the Knockouts. Each episode featured knockout battles consisting of pairings from within each team. The contestants were not told who they were up against until the day of the Knockout. Each contestant sang a song of their own choice, back to back, and each knockout concluded with the respective coach eliminating one of the two contestants; the five winners for each coach advanced to the live shows.

Color key

Artist won the Knockouts and advances to the Live shows
Artist lost the Knockouts and was eliminated

Episode	Coach	Order	Song	Artists		Song
Episode 16 (Monday, Oct. 29, 2012)	Adam Levine	1	"Love on Top"	Joselyn Rivera	Kayla Nevarez	"Shark in the Water"
Episode 16 (Monday, Oct. 29, 2012)	Adam Levine	2	"(Everything I Do) I Do It For You"	Bryan Keith	Joe Kirkland	"Mean"
Episode 16 (Monday, Oct. 29, 2012)	Adam Levine	3	"Paris (Ooh La La)"	Amanda Brown	Michelle Brooks-Thompson	"Spotlight"
Episode 16 (Monday, Oct. 29, 2012)	Adam Levine	4	"You Know I'm No Good"	Loren Allred	Nicole Nelson	"If I Ain't Got You"
Episode 16 (Monday, Oct. 29, 2012)	Adam Levine	5	"Bulletproof"	Melanie Martinez	Sam James	"Walking in Memphis"
Episode 16 (Monday, Oct. 29, 2012)	CeeLo Green	6	"Jolene"	Cody Belew	Avery Wilson	"Yeah 3x"
Episode 16 (Monday, Oct. 29, 2012)	CeeLo Green	7	"Call Me Maybe"	Mackenzie Bourg	Daniel Rosa	"Back To December"
Episode 16 (Monday, Oct. 29, 2012)	CeeLo Green	8	"Against All Odds (Take a Look at Me Now)"	Trevin Hunte	Terisa Griffin	"Saving All My Love for You"
Episode 16 (Monday, Oct. 29, 2012)	CeeLo Green	9	"Put Your Records On"	Nicholas David	Mycle Wastman	"Don't Let the Sun Go Down on Me"
Episode 16 (Monday, Oct. 29, 2012)	CeeLo Green	10	"Are You Gonna Go My Way"	Diego Val	Caitlin Michele	"Bring Me to Life"
Episode 17 (Tuesday, Oct. 30, 2012)	Christina Aguilera	1	"I Have Nothing"	Devyn DeLoera	Laura Vivas	"I Need to Know"
Episode 17 (Tuesday, Oct. 30, 2012)	Christina Aguilera	2	"Already Gone"	Adriana Louise	Celica Westbrook	"Never Say Never"
Episode 17 (Tuesday, Oct. 30, 2012)	Christina Aguilera	3	"Stuck on You"	Dez Duron	Alessandra Guercio	"Take a Bow"
Episode 17 (Tuesday, Oct. 30, 2012)	Christina Aguilera	4	"You Found Me"	De’Borah	Chevonne	"Dancing with Myself"
Episode 17 (Tuesday, Oct. 30, 2012)	Christina Aguilera	5	"Fighter"	Sylvia Yacoub	Aquile	"Grenade"
Episode 17 (Tuesday, Oct. 30, 2012)	Blake Shelton	6	"Gunpowder and Lead"	Liz Davis	Gracia Harrison	"I Don't Want to Miss a Thing"
Episode 17 (Tuesday, Oct. 30, 2012)	Blake Shelton	7	"Maybe I'm Amazed"	Terry McDermott	Rudy Parris	"Forever"
Episode 17 (Tuesday, Oct. 30, 2012)	Blake Shelton	8	"Love is a Battlefield"	Michaela Paige	Collin McLoughlin	"Breakeven"
Episode 17 (Tuesday, Oct. 30, 2012)	Blake Shelton	9	"Somebody to Love"	Julio Cesar Castillo	MarissaAnne	"Lady Marmalade"
Episode 17 (Tuesday, Oct. 30, 2012)	Blake Shelton	10	"Payphone"	Cassadee Pope	Suzanna Choffel	"Could You Be Loved"

== Live shows ==
Color key

Artist was saved by Public's vote
Artist was saved by his/her coach
Artist's iTunes vote multiplied by 10 after their studio version of the song reached iTunes top 10
Artist was eliminated

=== Week 1: Live playoffs (Nov. 5, 7 & 8) ===
The live playoffs were aired on November 5 and 7, followed by a results show on Thursday, November 8. No episode was aired on November 6 due to the coverage of the 2012 United States presidential election.

Performances were intentionally stripped down compared to previous seasons, so that there is greater focus on the voices of the artists. Special guests included Taylor Kinney from Chicago Fire in the audience.

Date	Order	Coach	Artist	Song	Result
Episode 18 (Monday, Nov. 5, 2012)	1	Adam Levine	Joselyn Rivera	"Give Your Heart a Break"	Eliminated
Episode 18 (Monday, Nov. 5, 2012)	2	Blake Shelton	Terry McDermott	"Don't Stop Believin'"	Public's vote
Episode 18 (Monday, Nov. 5, 2012)	3	Adam Levine	Melanie Martinez	"Hit the Road Jack"	Adam's choice
Episode 18 (Monday, Nov. 5, 2012)	4	Blake Shelton	Liz Davis	"Independence Day"	Eliminated
Episode 18 (Monday, Nov. 5, 2012)	5	Blake Shelton	Cassadee Pope	"My Happy Ending"	Public's vote
Episode 18 (Monday, Nov. 5, 2012)	6	Adam Levine	Bryan Keith	"Iris"	Public's vote
Episode 18 (Monday, Nov. 5, 2012)	7	Blake Shelton	Michaela Paige	"Everybody Talks"	Blake's choice
Episode 18 (Monday, Nov. 5, 2012)	8	Blake Shelton	Julio Cesar Castillo	"El Rey"	Eliminated
Episode 18 (Monday, Nov. 5, 2012)	9	Adam Levine	Loren Allred	"All Around the World"	Eliminated
Episode 18 (Monday, Nov. 5, 2012)	10	Adam Levine	Amanda Brown	"Dream On"	Public's vote
Episode 19 (Wednesday, Nov. 7, 2012)	1	Christina Aguilera	Adriana Louise	"Firework"	Christina's choice
Episode 19 (Wednesday, Nov. 7, 2012)	2	CeeLo Green	Cody Belew	"One More Try"	CeeLo's choice
Episode 19 (Wednesday, Nov. 7, 2012)	3	Christina Aguilera	De'Borah	"Who Knew"	Eliminated
Episode 19 (Wednesday, Nov. 7, 2012)	4	CeeLo Green	Diego Val	"Bailamos"	Eliminated
Episode 19 (Wednesday, Nov. 7, 2012)	5	CeeLo Green	MacKenzie Bourg	"What Makes You Beautiful"	Eliminated
Episode 19 (Wednesday, Nov. 7, 2012)	6	Christina Aguilera	Devyn DeLoera	"Bleeding Love"	Eliminated
Episode 19 (Wednesday, Nov. 7, 2012)	7	CeeLo Green	Nicholas David	"You're the First, the Last, My Everything"	Public's vote
Episode 19 (Wednesday, Nov. 7, 2012)	8	Christina Aguilera	Sylvia Yacoub	"The One That Got Away"	Public's vote
Episode 19 (Wednesday, Nov. 7, 2012)	9	Christina Aguilera	Dez Duron	"Wanted"	Public's vote
Episode 19 (Wednesday, Nov. 7, 2012)	10	CeeLo Green	Trevin Hunte	"How Am I Supposed to Live Without You"	Public's vote

Non-competition performances
Order	Performers	Song
18	Team Adam & Team Blake	"Peace of Mind"
19	Team CeeLo & Team Christina	"Sing"
20.1	Team Adam & Team Blake	"Stronger (What Doesn't Kill You)"
20.2	Maroon 5	"Daylight"
20.3	Team CeeLo & Team Christina	"Drive By"
20.4	Jermaine Paul	"I Believe in This Life"

=== Week 2: Top 12 (Nov. 12 & 13) ===
The live top 12 performances were aired on November 12, followed by a results show on November 13.

From this point on in the competition, all remaining contestants performed live each week, and only the public's vote determined which contestants advanced in the competition. Unlike previous seasons, rather than each team eliminating equal numbers of contestants each week, third season (and later seasons) eliminations applied individually without regard to contestants' team affiliation (meaning that all artists competed head-to-head against all remaining contestants each week), introducing the possibility of a final without an equal team representation.

Additionally, producers made changes in the voting system with regards to iTunes singles purchases, announced during the results show. Previous voting via iTunes purchases of contestant performances had previously only counted singly during the official voting window and only accredited to the live show in concern. As of this week in the competition, if a competitor's performance stays within the Top 10 of the iTunes "Top 200 Single Chart" (updated hourly) until the close of voting, it will be awarded an iTunes bonus that multiplies iTunes votes made in the 24-hour voting window by ten. The finale's vote count will have include a 'Cumulative iTunes Vote Total' of all singles (from Top 12 onwards) purchased during and outside of the various voting windows, with iTunes bonus previously earned.

Order	Coach	Artist	Song	Result
1	Blake Shelton	Michaela Paige	"Blow Me (One Last Kiss)"	Eliminated
2	Christina Aguilera	Dez Duron	"Can't Take My Eyes Off You"	Public's vote
3	Christina Aguilera	Adriana Louise	"Good Girl"	Eliminated
4	CeeLo Green	Cody Belew	"The Best"	Public's vote
5	Adam Levine	Amanda Brown	"Spectrum"	Public's vote
6	Adam Levine	Bryan Keith	"Back to Black"	Public's vote
7	Blake Shelton	Cassadee Pope	"Behind These Hazel Eyes"	Public's vote
8	CeeLo Green	Trevin Hunte	"When a Man Loves a Woman"	Public's vote
9	Adam Levine	Melanie Martinez	"Cough Syrup"	Public's vote
10	CeeLo Green	Nicholas David	"The Power of Love"	Public's vote
11	Christina Aguilera	Sylvia Yacoub	"My Heart Will Go On"	Public's vote
12	Blake Shelton	Terry McDermott	"More Than a Feeling"	Public's vote

Non-competition performances
Order	Performers	Song
22.1	Christina Aguilera and CeeLo Green	"Make the World Move"
22.2	CeeLo Green and his three finalists (Cody Belew, Trevin Hunte, & Nicholas David)	"Stayin' Alive"
22.3	Blake Shelton and his three finalists (Cassadee Pope, Terry McDermott & Michaela Paige)	"Life Is a Highway"
22.4	Jason Aldean (with Bryan Keith & Dez Duron)	"The Only Way I Know"

=== Week 3: Top 10 (Nov 19 & 20) ===
The live top 10 performances aired on November 19, followed by a results show on November 20. Christina, Blake and Cee Lo brought in Ron Fair, Scott Hendricks and Jennifer Hudson respectively to help in this week's coaching. Other special guests included lead actors from the cast of Guys with Kids in the audience.

Cassadee Pope became the first-ever artist to be awarded the iTunes bonus as her singles hit #1 on iTunes Top 100 Singles chart.

Order	Coach	Artist	Song	Result
1	Christina Aguilera	Sylvia Yacoub	"Girl on Fire"	Eliminated
2	Blake Shelton	Terry McDermott	"Summer of '69"	Public's vote
3	Adam Levine	Melanie Martinez	"Seven Nation Army"	Public's vote
4	CeeLo Green	Cody Belew	"Crazy In Love"	Public's vote
5	Adam Levine	Bryan Keith	"New York State of Mind"	Eliminated
6	Adam Levine	Amanda Brown	"Stars"	Public's vote
7	CeeLo Green	Nicholas David	"Lean on Me"	Public's vote
8	CeeLo Green	Trevin Hunte	"Scream"	Public's vote
9	Blake Shelton	Cassadee Pope	"Over You"	Public's vote
10	Christina Aguilera	Dez Duron	"Feeling Good"	Public's vote

Non-competition performances
Order	Performers	Song
23	Christina Aguilera and Blake Shelton	"Just a Fool"
24.1	Christina Aguilera and her two finalists (Sylvia Yacoub & Dez Duron)	"Let There Be Love"
24.2	Adam Levine and his three finalists (Melanie Martinez, Bryan Keith and Amanda Brown)	"Crazy Little Thing Called Love"
24.3	Team Blake & Team Christina	"Hit Me with Your Best Shot"^{1}
24.4	Team Adam & Team Cee Lo	"I Want You to Want Me" ^{1}
24.5	Rascal Flatts	"Changed"

Note

1. Viewers voted between a performance of "Hit Me with Your Best Shot" by Team Blake & Team Christina, or "I Want You to Want Me" by Team Adam & Team Cee Lo via Twitter during the airing of the results show.

=== Week 4: Top 8 (Nov 26 & 27) ===
The live top 8 performances aired on November 26, followed by a results show on November 27. Cee Lo brought in Bill Withers, the original singer/songwriter of "Lean on Me" to help coach Nicholas David this week.

This week's iTunes bonus multipliers were awarded to Cassadee Pope (#2), Melanie Martinez (#4) and Nicholas David (#9).

With the elimination of Dez Duron Christina Aguilera has no more artists on her team, making her the first coach to not have her team be represented in the finale.

Order	Coach	Artist	Song	Result
1	Adam Levine	Amanda Brown	"Someone Like You"	Public's vote
2	CeeLo Green	Cody Belew	"Somebody to Love"	Eliminated
3	Blake Shelton	Terry McDermott	"Over"	Public's vote
4	Adam Levine	Melanie Martinez	"Too Close"	Public's vote
5	Christina Aguilera	Dez Duron	"U Smile"	Eliminated
6	CeeLo Green	Trevin Hunte	"The Greatest Love of All"	Public's vote
7	CeeLo Green	Nicholas David	"What's Going On"	Public's vote
8	Blake Shelton	Cassadee Pope	"Are You Happy Now?"	Public's vote

Non-competition performances
Order	Performers	Song
25.1	Cassadee Pope, Dez Duron, Melanie Martinez, & Terry McDermott	"Move Along"
25.2	Amanda Brown, Cody Belew, Nicholas David, & Trevin Hunte	"Any Way You Want It"
26.1	Amanda Brown & Trevin Hunte	"Marry the Night"
26.2	Cee Lo Green and Kermit the Frog	"Bein' Green"
26.3	Cody Belew, Melanie Martinez, Nicholas David, & Terry McDermott	"Rhythm of Love"
26.4	Dez Duron & Cassadee Pope	"Hate That I Love You"
26.5	50 Cent featuring Adam Levine	"My Life"

=== Week 5: Top 6 (Dec 3 & 4) ===
The live top 6 performances aired on December 3, followed by a results show on December 4. Each contestant sang two songs, one of their choice, and one of the coach's choice. Coach Cee Lo was sick during rehearsals, so he brought in Pat Monahan, lead singer for Train, to coach his artists this week, while still picking his team members' songs and keeping in touch with them on the phone.

This week's iTunes bonus were awarded for Terry McDermott (#2), Cassadee Pope (#4 & #7), Nicholas David (#5) and Trevin Hunte (#9).

With the eliminations of Melanie Martinez and Amanda Brown, Levine no longer has any artists remaining on his team.

Coach	Artist	Order	Song (Coach's choice)	Order	Song (Artist's choice)	Result
CeeLo Green	Nicholas David	1	"September"	12	"Over the Rainbow"	Public's vote
Blake Shelton	Cassadee Pope	2	"Stand"	11	"I'm With You"	Public's vote
Adam Levine	Amanda Brown	9	"Here I Go Again"	3	"(You Make Me Feel Like) A Natural Woman"	Eliminated
Blake Shelton	Terry McDermott	7	"Stay with Me"	4	"I Want to Know What Love Is"	Public's vote
CeeLo Green	Trevin Hunte	5	"Walking on Sunshine"	8	"And I Am Telling You I'm Not Going"	Public's vote
Adam Levine	Melanie Martinez	10	"The Show"	6	"Crazy"	Eliminated

Non-competition performances
Order	Performers	Song
28.1	Trevin Hunte & Terry McDermott	"Feel Again"
28.2	Cassadee Pope & Amanda Brown	"Breakaway"
28.3	Nicholas David & Melanie Martinez	"Criminal"
28.4	Ne-Yo	"Let Me Love You (Until You Learn to Love Yourself)"
28.5	Matchbox Twenty	"Overjoyed"

=== Week 6: Semifinals (Dec 10 & 11) ===
The semifinal performances aired on December 10, followed by a results show on December 11. Special guests included Howie Mandel from Take It All and Of Monsters and Men, whose song "Little Talks" was covered in a non-competition performance, in the audience. Tony Lucca was also interviewed for a short while with his coach from last season, Adam Levine, in the Sprint Skybox.

This week's recipients for the iTunes bonus were Cassadee Pope (#1), Terry McDermott (#2) and Nicholas David (#5).

Order	Coach	Artist	Song	Result
1	CeeLo Green	Trevin Hunte	"Wind Beneath My Wings"	Eliminated
2	CeeLo Green	Nicholas David	"You Are So Beautiful"	Public's vote
3	Blake Shelton	Cassadee Pope	"Stupid Boy"	Public's vote
4	Blake Shelton	Terry McDermott	"Let It Be"	Public's vote

Non-competition performances
Order	Performers	Song
29.1	Michael Bublé	"Christmas (Baby Please Come Home)"
29.2	Blake Shelton and 16 members of his team	"White Christmas"
30.1	Cassadee Pope and Terry McDermott	"Little Talks"
30.2	Nicholas David and Trevin Hunte	"Hero"
30.4	Juliet Simms	"Wild Child"
30.5	RaeLynn	"Boyfriend"
30.6	Chris Mann	"Roads"

=== Week 7: Finale (Dec 17 & 18) ===
The final performances aired on December 17, followed by a results show on December 18. Each finalist would perform a reprise of a recent performance, a duet with their coach, and a solo performance. Special guests included the cast of 1600 Penn and The Biggest Loser in the audience.

Three performances reached Top 10 on iTunes as follows Cassadee Pope (#1 & #6) and Terry McDermott (#5).

The live performance opens with all contestants and judges singing Leonard Cohen's "Hallelujah" holding up the names of the victims of the Sandy Hook Elementary School mass shooting 3 days prior to its airing.

Coach	Artist	Order	Solo song	Order	Duet song (with Coach)	Order	Reprise song	Result
CeeLo Green	Nicholas David	1	"Great Balls of Fire"/"Fire"	8	"Play That Funky Music"	4	"Lean on Me"	Third place
Blake Shelton	Cassadee Pope	9	"Cry"	6	"Steve McQueen"	2	"Over You"	Winner
Blake Shelton	Terry McDermott	5	"Broken Wings"	3	"Dude (Looks Like a Lady)"	7	"I Want to Know What Love Is"	Runner-up

Non-competition performances
Order	Performers	Song
31	The Voice coaches, live show contestants, Christina Milian, and Carson Daly	"Hallelujah"^{1}
32.1	Rihanna	"Diamonds"
32.2	Terry McDermott (with Amanda Brown, Bryan Keith, Michaela Paige, and Rudy Parris)	"Rock and Roll All Nite"
32.3	Nicholas David and Smokey Robinson	"Cruisin'"
32.4	The Killers (with Cassadee Pope)	"Here with Me"
32.5	Cody Belew, Dez Duron, Diego Val, Julio Cesar Castillo, and Mackenzie Bourg	"Stacy's Mom"
32.6	Kelly Clarkson (with Cassadee Pope, and Terry McDermott)	"Catch My Breath"
32.7	Cassadee Pope (with Melanie Martinez, De'Borah, and Liz Davis)	"It's Time"
32.8	Terry McDermott and Peter Frampton	"Baby, I Love Your Way"
32.9	Adriana Louise, Devyn DeLoera, Joselyn Rivera, Loren Allred, and Sylvia Yacoub	"Best of My Love"
32.10	Bruno Mars	"When I Was Your Man"
32.11	Nicholas David (with Amanda Brown, Dez Duron, and Trevin Hunte)	"End of the Road"
32.12	Cassadee Pope and Avril Lavigne	"I'm with You"
32.13	The Voice coaches: Adam Levine, Blake Shelton, Cee Lo Green, and Christina Aguilera	"Good Riddance (Time of Your Life)"
32.14	Cassadee Pope (winner)	"Cry"

1. The performance was a tribute to the Newtown, Connecticut shooting victims, and placards displaying the names and ages of the victims were held by the performers.

== Elimination chart ==
=== Overall ===
Color key
Artist's info

- Team Adam
- Team CeeLo
- Team Christina
- Team Blake

Result details

- Winner
- Runner-up
- Third Place
- Artist was saved by his/her coach
- Artist was saved by the public
- Artist was eliminated

Live show results per week
Artist	Week 1 Playoffs	Week 2	Week 3	Week 4	Week 5	Week 6	Week 7 Finale
Cassadee Pope	Safe	Safe	Safe	Safe	Safe	Safe	Winner
Terry McDermott	Safe	Safe	Safe	Safe	Safe	Safe	Runner-up
Nicholas David	Safe	Safe	Safe	Safe	Safe	Safe	3rd place
Trevin Hunte	Safe	Safe	Safe	Safe	Safe	Eliminated	Eliminated (week 6)
Amanda Brown	Safe	Safe	Safe	Safe	Eliminated	Eliminated (week 5)	
Melanie Martinez	Safe	Safe	Safe	Safe	Eliminated	Eliminated (week 5)	
Cody Belew	Safe	Safe	Safe	Eliminated	Eliminated (week 4)		
Dez Duron	Safe	Safe	Safe	Eliminated	Eliminated (week 4)		
Bryan Keith	Safe	Safe	Eliminated	Eliminated (week 3)			
Sylvia Yacoub	Safe	Safe	Eliminated	Eliminated (week 3)			
Michaela Paige	Safe	Eliminated	Eliminated (week 2)				
Adriana Louise	Safe	Eliminated	Eliminated (week 2)				
Loren Allred	Eliminated	Eliminated (week 1)					
MacKenzie Bourg	Eliminated	Eliminated (week 1)					
Julio Cesar Castillo	Eliminated	Eliminated (week 1)					
Liz Davis	Eliminated	Eliminated (week 1)					
Devyn DeLoera	Eliminated	Eliminated (week 1)					
De'Borah	Eliminated	Eliminated (week 1)					
Joselyn Rivera	Eliminated	Eliminated (week 1)					
Diego Val	Eliminated	Eliminated (week 1)					

=== Team ===
Color key
Artist's info

- Team Adam
- Team CeeLo
- Team Christina
- Team Blake

Result details

- Winner
- Runner-up
- Third place
- Eliminated
- Artist received one or more iTunes bonus that week (applicable from week 3 onwards)
- Number of iTunes bonuses received
- Teams are in 3 artists
- No artists remaining on his/her team

Artist	Week 1 Playoffs	Week 2	Week 3	Week 4	Week 5	Week 6	Week 7 Finale
Amanda Brown	Public's choice	Advanced	Advanced	Advanced	Eliminated		
Melanie Martinez	Coach's choice	Advanced	Advanced	Advanced	Eliminated		
Bryan Keith	Public's choice	Advanced	Eliminated				
Loren Allred	Eliminated						
Joselyn Rivera	Eliminated						
Nicholas David	Public's choice	Advanced	Advanced	Advanced	Advanced	Advanced	Third Place
Trevin Hunte	Public's choice	Advanced	Advanced	Advanced	Advanced	Eliminated	
Cody Belew	Coach's choice	Advanced	Advanced	Eliminated			
MacKenzie Bourg	Eliminated						
Diego Val	Eliminated						
Dez Duron	Public's choice	Advanced	Advanced	Eliminated			
Sylvia Yacoub	Public's choice	Advanced	Eliminated				
Adriana Louise	Coach's choice	Eliminated					
De'Borah	Eliminated						
Devyn DeLoera	Eliminated						
Cassadee Pope	Public's choice	Advanced	Advanced	Advanced	Advanced	Advanced	Winner
Terry McDermott	Public's choice	Advanced	Advanced	Advanced	Advanced	Advanced	Runner-up
Michaela Paige	Coach's choice	Eliminated					
Julio Cesar Castillo	Eliminated						
Liz Davis	Eliminated						

Rank	Coach	Top 12	Top 10	Top 8	Top 6	Top 4	Top 3
1	Blake Shelton	3	2	2	2	2	2
2	CeeLo Green	3	3	3	2	2	1
3	Adam Levine	3	3	2	2	0	0
4	Christina Aguilera	3	2	1	0	0	0

== Performances by guests/coaches ==
Episode	Show segment	Performer(s)	Title	Hot 100 reaction	Hot Digital Songs reaction	Performance type
4	The Blind Auditions, Part 4	Christina Aguilera	"Your Body"	34 (debut)	10 (debut)	music video teaser
20	The Live Playoff Results	Maroon 5	"Daylight"	did not chart	did not chart	live performance
20	The Live Playoff Results	Jermaine Paul	"I Believe in This Life"	did not chart	did not chart	live performance
22	Top 12, Live Results	Jason Aldean (with Bryan Keith and Dez Duron)	"The Only Way I Know"	78 (+15)	59 (re-entry)	live performance
22	Top 12, Live Results	Christina Aguilera ft. Cee Lo Green	"Make the World Move"	did not chart	did not chart	live performance
23	Top 10 Perform Live	Christina Aguilera ft. Blake Shelton	"Just a Fool"	71 (+21)	25 (+9)	live performance
24	Top 10, Live Results	Rascal Flatts (with Cody Belew and Cassadee Pope)	"Changed"	did not chart	did not chart	live performance
24	Top 10, Live Results	Christina Aguilera (with Sylvia Yacoub and Dez Duron)	"Let There Be Love"	did not chart	did not chart	live performance
25	Top 8 Perform Live	50 Cent ft. Adam Levine	"My Life"	27 (debut)	4 (debut)	live performance
26	Top 8, Live Results	Cee Lo Green and The Muppets	"Bein' Green"	no recording	no recording	live performance
28	Top 6, Live Results	Ne-Yo (with Amanda Brown)	"Let Me Love You (Until You Learn to Love Yourself)"	10 (=)	29 (=)	live performance
28	Top 6, Live Results	Matchbox Twenty (with Nicholas David and Trevin Hunte)	"Overjoyed"	did not chart	did not chart	live performance
29	Live Semifinal Performances	Michael Bublé	"Christmas (Baby Please Come Home)"	did not chart	did not chart	live performance
29	Live Semifinal Performances	Blake Shelton (with 16 members of Team Blake)	"White Christmas"	did not chart	did not chart	live performance
30	Semifinals, Live Results	Juliet Simms	"Wild Child"	did not chart	did not chart	live performance
30	Semifinals, Live Results	RaeLynn	"Boyfriend"	118 (debut)	56 (debut)	live performance
30	Semifinals, Live Results	Chris Mann	"Roads"	did not chart	did not chart	live performance
32	Finals, Live Results	Rihanna	"Diamonds"	2 (=)	5 (−1)	live performance
32	Finals, Live Results	The Killers (with Cassadee Pope)	"Here with Me"	119 (debut)	did not chart	live performance
32	Finals, Live Results	Smokey Robinson (with Nicholas David)	"Cruisin'"	did not chart	did not chart	live performance (duet)
32	Finals, Live Results	Kelly Clarkson (with Cassadee Pope and Terry McDermott)	"Catch My Breath"	30 (+19)	22 (+21)	live performance
32	Finals, Live Results	Peter Frampton (with Terry McDermott)	"Baby, I Love Your Way"	did not chart	did not chart	live performance (duet)
32	Finals, Live Results	Bruno Mars	"When I Was Your Man"	62 (re-entry)	26 (re-entry)	live performance
32	Finals, Live Results	Avril Lavigne (with Cassadee Pope)	"I'm with You"	did not chart	did not chart	live performance (duet)

== Artists appearances on other talent shows ==
- Daniel Rosa, Sam James, and Dez Duron sang in the blind auditions in season two and failed to make a team.
- JR Aquino, Danny Hunter Jones, and Alessandra Guercio reached the Hollywood rounds of American Idol in seasons four, nine, and ten respectively, but did not reach the Top 24.
- Liz Davis was the winner of P. Diddy's Starmaker
- DOMO appeared on America's Best Dance Crew – season four as a member of Rhythm City.
- Adanna Duru later became a finalist on the fourteenth season of "American Idol."
- MacKenzie Bourg later made the Top 24 on the fifteenth season of American Idol and finished in fourth place.
- Loren Allred would go on to provide the singing voice behind Rebecca Ferguson's character Jenny Lind in the 2017 movie The Greatest Showman, performing the song "Never Enough" which has since certified Gold in the United Kingdom and the United States, and has charted in several other countries. The reprise has since certified Silver in the UK. She has also featured on Hardwell's and KAAZE's "This Is Love” and was a finalist on the fifteenth season of Britain’s Got Talent.
- Sam James would later go on Season 1 of Songland.
- Cassadee Pope would later go on the Season 3 episode of Lip Sync Battle: "Dustin Lynch vs. Cassadee Pope". She also went on to have multiple Platinum singles and was nominated for a Grammy award. She also appeared on Name That Tune head-to-head with Jana Kramer.
- Melanie Martinez later went on to star in and direct her own film titled K-12 which is for her second album of the same name. She also went on to have a Platinum album and multiple Platinum singles.
- Odiseas Georgiadis auditioned again at Season 13, but failed to make a team again.
- Amanda Brown (singer) appeared in Season 21 to support her sister, Samara, in the Blind Auditions

== Ratings ==
Season three premiered on September 10, 2012, and was watched by 12.28 million viewers with a 4.2 rating in the key 18–49 demographic. It was down 39 percent in the demo from last season's premiere. The Voice aired three times during its first week, going up against The X Factor on September 12, 2012. This show was highly criticised by Simon Cowell, who said that The X Factor would win in ratings. However, both The Voice and The X Factor tied on September 12, 2012, both with a 3.4 rating in the 18–49 demographic, but The Voice won in total viewers. In its regular time slot on Mondays and Tuesdays, The Voice airs opposite Dancing with the Stars.

#	Episode	Original air date	Production	Timeslot (ET)	Viewers (millions)	Rating/Share (Adults 18–49)
1	"The Blind Auditions Premiere, Part 1"	September 10, 2012	301	Monday 8:00pm	12.28	4.2/11
2	"The Blind Auditions Premiere, Part 2"	September 11, 2012	302	Tuesday 8:00pm	11.42	4.0/12
3	"The Blind Auditions, Part 3"	September 12, 2012	303	Wednesday 8:00pm	10.89	3.4/11
4	"The Blind Auditions, Part 4"	September 17, 2012	304	Monday 8:00pm	13.57	4.7/12
5	"The Blind Auditions, Part 5"	September 18, 2012	305	Tuesday 8:00pm	13.60	4.7/14
6	"The Blind Auditions, Part 6"	September 24, 2012	306	Monday 8:00pm	12.18	4.4/11
7	"The Blind Auditions, Part 7"	September 25, 2012	307	Tuesday 8:00pm	11.57	4.2/13
8	"The Blind Auditions, Part 8"	October 1, 2012	308	Monday 8:00pm	12.55	4.6/12
9	"The Best of the Blind Auditions"	October 2, 2012	309	Tuesday 8:00pm	8.48	3.0/9
10	"The Battles Premiere, Part 1"	October 8, 2012	310	Monday 8:00pm	12.89	4.8/12
11	"The Battles Premiere, Part 2"	October 9, 2012	311	Tuesday 8:00pm	12.19	4.5/13
12	"The Battles, Part 3"	October 15, 2012	312	Monday 8:00pm	13.01	4.8/13
13	"The Battles, Part 4"	October 16, 2012	313	Tuesday 8:00pm	12.04	4.6/13
14	"The Battles, Part 5"	October 22, 2012	314	Monday 8:00pm	12.02	4.3/11
15	"The Battles, Part 6"	October 23, 2012	315	Tuesday 8:00pm	11.22	4.3/12
16	"The Knockouts Premiere, Part 1"	October 29, 2012	316	Monday 8:00pm	12.44	4.8/11
17	"The Knockouts, Part 2"	October 30, 2012	317	Tuesday 8:00pm	12.13	4.6/12
18	"Live Playoffs, Part 1"	November 5, 2012	318	Monday 8:00pm	11.93	4.5/10
19	"Live Playoffs, Part 2"	November 7, 2012	319	Wednesday 8:00pm	10.47	3.8/10
20	"Live Playoffs, Results"	November 8, 2012	320	Thursday 8:00pm	8.83	3.0/9
21	"Live Top 12 Performance"	November 12, 2012	321	Monday 8:00pm	11.63	4.4/11
22	"Live Top 12 Results"	November 13, 2012	322	Tuesday 8:00pm	11.15	3.9/11
23	"Live Top 10 Performance"	November 19, 2012	323	Monday 8:00pm	10.60	3.7/9
24	"Live Top 10 Results"	November 20, 2012	324	Tuesday 8:00pm	9.47	3.4/10
25	"Live Top 8 Performance"	November 26, 2012	325	Monday 8:00pm	12.17	4.2/11
26	"Live Top 8 Results"	November 27, 2012	326	Tuesday 8:00pm	11.57	3.8/11
27	"Live Top 6 Performance"	December 3, 2012	327	Monday 8:00pm	12.11	3.9/10
28	"Live Top 6 Results"	December 4, 2012	328	Tuesday 8:00pm	11.52	3.5/10
29	"Live Top 4 Semifinals Performance"	December 10, 2012	329	Monday 8:00pm	12.33	3.8/10
30	"Live Top 4 Semifinals Results"	December 11, 2012	330	Tuesday 8:00pm	11.52	3.6/10
31	"Live Finale Performance"	December 17, 2012	331	Monday 8:00pm	13.37	4.2/11
32	"Live Finale Results"	December 18, 2012	332	Tuesday 9:00pm	14.13	4.9/13

== Reception ==
=== Awards ===
Season 3 won the 2013 Primetime Emmy Award for Outstanding Reality-Competition Program. This was the series' first win in that category.
