= Ben Taub (journalist) =

American journalist

- Born: January 9, 1991 (age 35)
- Education: Princeton University (AB); Columbia University Graduate School of Journalism
- Employer: The New Yorker
- Awards: George Polk Awards (2018, 2019); National Magazine Awards (2019); Pulitzer Prize for Feature Writing (2020)

Ben Taub (born January 9, 1991) is an American journalist who is a staff writer for The New Yorker magazine. He has written for the magazine about a range of subjects, including jihadism, crime, conflict, espionage, and exploration, mostly in Africa, Europe, the Arctic, and the Middle East.

== Life ==
Taub graduated from Princeton University with an A.B. in philosophy in 2014. In 2012, during a year off from Princeton, he was a contestant on The Voice, on CeeLo Green's team. Six months later, he used the stipend from appearing on the show to fund his first trip to Kilis and the Turkish-Syrian border, to learn how to be a war correspondent. Taub's work in Kilis culminated in his 149-page long senior thesis, "Fools and Philosophy on the Fringe of War", completed under the supervision of Gideon Rosen.

In 2015, he graduated from the Columbia Graduate School of Journalism.

== Awards ==
In 2017, Taub's work on war crimes in Syria, which was supported by the Pulitzer Center on Crisis Reporting and published by The New Yorker in both English and Arabic, was short-listed for a National Magazine Award and won the Livingston Award for International Reporting, the Robert F. Kennedy Journalism Award for International Print reporting, and the Overseas Press Club Award for Investigative Reporting. Taub also received the American Society of Magazine Editors Next Award for Journalists Under 30, and was named one of the Forbes 30 Under 30 in Media.

In 2018, his work on a convergence of crises in the Sahel won the George Polk Award for Magazine Reporting and the Prince Albert II of Monaco and United Nations Correspondents Association Global Prize for coverage of Climate Change.

In 2019, his work on Iraq's post-ISIS campaign of revenge, which was supported by the Pulitzer Center on Crisis Reporting, won the National Magazine Award for Reporting and the George Polk Award for Magazine Reporting, making him the eighth back-to-back Polk laureate and the first in 20 years.

In 2020, Taub won the Pulitzer Prize for Feature Writing for the 2019 article "Guantanamo's Darkest Secret", about Mohamedou Ould Salahi, who was held at the Guantanamo Bay detention camp without charge from 2002 to 2016.

In 2026, Taub won an Overseas Press Club Award for his 2025 article about polar bear hunters in Ittoqqortoormiit, the most remote settlement in Greenland.

== Bibliography ==
- Taub, Ben (June 1, 2015). "Journey to Jihad". A Reporter at Large. The New Yorker.
- — (December 4, 2017). "The emergency : around Lake Chad, the world's most complex humanitarian disaster is unfolding". A Reporter at Large. The New Yorker. 93 (39): 46–57. (Note: Online version is titled "Lake Chad: the world's most complex humanitarian disaster".)
- — (April 22, 2019). "Guantánamo's darkest secret". The New Yorker.
- — (January 20, 2020). "The fight to save an innocent refugee from almost certain death". A Reporter at Large. The New Yorker.
- — (December 21, 2020). "Murder in Malta : corruption consumed a journalist's work, then claimed her life". A Reporter at Large. The New Yorker. 96 (41): 38–49.
- — (September 20, 2021). "A spy in flight : how a Syrian war criminal and double agent disappeared into the shadows of Europe". A Reporter at Large. The New Yorker. 97 (29): 34–49. (Note: Online version is titled "How a Syrian war criminal and double agent disappeared in Europe".)
- — (May 23, 2022). "In search of the sublime : what the photographer Paolo Pellegrin sees in the dark". Profiles. The New Yorker. 98 (13): 40–49. (Note: Online version is titled "Paolo Pellegrin's photographic quest for the sublime".)
- — (September 9, 2024). "Russia's Espionage War in the Arctic". A Reporter at Large. The New Yorker. (Note: Online version is titled "Russia's Espionage War in the Arctic".)

———————
