= Terisa Griffin =

Singer and songwriter from Monroe, LA

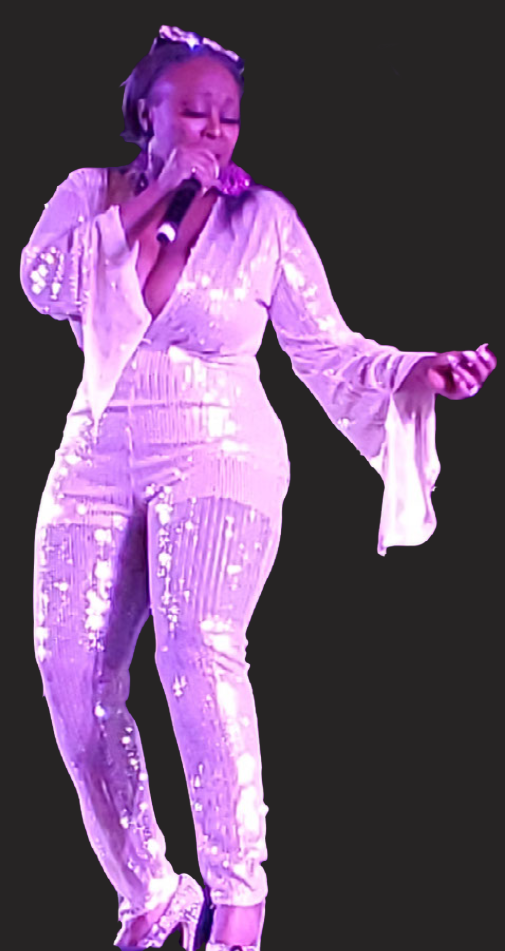

Background information
- Born: Theresa "Terisa" Griffin; Monroe, Louisiana, United States
- Genres: R&B; soul; urban contemporary; gospel; house; jazz
- Occupations: Singer; Songwriter
- Instruments: Vocals; Piano
- Label: My Naked Soul Productions

Terisa Griffin is an American singer and songwriter from Monroe, Louisiana who currently resides in Chicago, Illinois. Her most notable performance was on the American television series The Voice. She has toured with entertainers such as Patti LaBelle, Will Downing, Isaac Hayes and Jeffrey Osborne.

== Early career ==
Griffin began earning a living creating jingles for businesses and is the voice behind the Doublemint gum commercials featuring American tennis stars Venus and Serena Williams.

In a career changing moment, while singing background for Diana Ross on The Oprah Winfrey Show in 2000, Griffin gained national exposure to Oprah's television audience when Ross spontaneously passed her the microphone to finish singing "Only Love Conquers All".

== The Voice ==
In 2012, at the age of 42, Griffin auditioned for NBC's series The Voice (American season 3) with her rendition of "Someone Like You" by Adele. At the conclusion of her audition, Christina Aguilera and Blake Shelton indicated an interest in coaching her. After interacting with both, Griffin chose Blake Shelton's team.

Within a field of sixty-four contestants competing during the Battles Round, Griffin and Julio Cesar Castillo sang "Conga", originally performed by Gloria Estefan and Miami Sound Machine. Blake Shelton picked Julio Cesar Castillo to coach, but she was "stolen" by CeeLo Green and thereby joined his team in the Knockouts Round.

During the Knockouts Round, Griffin broke her ankle backstage during rehearsals which required the use of crutches. She decided to remain in the competition wearing an orthopedic boot as she performed. As one of the remaining twenty competitors she sang "Saving All My Love For You" made famous by Whitney Houston. She battled against Trevin Hunte who sang "Against All Odds (Take a Look at Me Now)" by Phil Collins, and ultimately Trevin advanced to the next round.

== Independent productions ==
In 1998, Griffin released her debut CD entitled Songbird. With the exception of "A Song For You" by Leon Russell, the album was performed, written and produced by Griffin.

In 2006, under her My Naked Soul Productions label, Griffin released her first full-length EP My Naked Soul which is co-produced by Terry Hunter.

Griffin released two albums in 2011 showing different facets of her vocal styles. Soulzophrenic (Personalities of Soul) contains primarily Contemporary R&B songs, while Soulzophrenic (Dance) delivers more up-tempo grooves and is co-produced by Terry Hunter and Maurice Joshua.

In 2015, Griffin's album Revival of Soul peaked at #6 on the Billboard Top Heatseekers Albums chart, #14 on the Billboard Top R&B Albums chart and #33 on the Billboard Top R&B/Hip-Hop Albums. The album also reached #43 on the Billboard Independent Albums chart and #177 on the Billboard Top 200 chart. "Distant Lover" by Marvin Gaye is one of the ten singles included, along with a remake of "Oh Me Oh My (I'm a Fool for You Baby)" to honor Aretha Franklin.

In 2021, Griffin released her rendition of the Aretha Franklin classic "Angel" on the Platinum Vybe produced compilation entitled The Soul Sessions. The song reached #1 on the U.S. Indie Soul Chart Top 30 and #28 on the U.K. Soul Chart Top 30.

== Stage and screen ==
In 2002, Griffin produced several "One Woman/One Voice" shows. "Fantasy: A Tribute to the Divas of Song and Stage" was dedicated to Josephine Baker, Ella Fitzgerald, Billie Holiday, Lena Horne and Sarah Vaughn. "Queens of R&B: A Tribute to the Queens of Rhythm and Blues" paid homage to powerhouse legends Aretha Franklin, Diana Ross, Donna Summer, Tina Turner, and Dinah Washington. "A Tribute to Famous Song Divas" to Anita Baker, Natalie Cole, Phyllis Hyman, Gladys Knight, Patti LaBelle and Nina Simone.

Griffin appeared in the 2011 independent film The Truth in which Hill Harper made his debut as a director. She composed and performed the title song for the film, "Can’t Stop Loving You". The film was written by Randy Crumpton and Craig J. Harris, it was produced by Crumpton, Kenny Johnson, Sharon King and James Ramos.

In 2013, Griffin joined Tony Award winner Jennifer Holliday, Martin actor Thomas Mikal Ford, along with singers Christopher Williams and Dave Hollister in the musical play Standing In The Shadows of Love.

In early 2020, Griffin began hosting a twice weekly internet cooking show "Tee Thyme" which also offers singing and audience interaction. The show was conceived during the abrupt touring hiatus many entertainers experienced due to the COVID-19 pandemic.

== Personal life ==
In 2007, Griffin established the non-profit organization Better Love Yourself, Inc. (BLY) to provide college bound students with life skills as well as supplies to help them succeed.

In 2012, Griffin married John Kendall, a trademark/patent attorney who co-founded the Chicago, Illinois chapter of the 100 Black Men of America. Jerry Butler walked the bride down the aisle, and the wedding was officiated by Congressman Bobby Rush with a prayer delivered by Reverend Jesse Jackson, Sr. Younger sisters Adrian and Anitra joined older sister Mary, a Grammy nominated singer, to sing several selections throughout the service.
