= The Voice (American TV series) season 24 =

The Voice
- Season 24
- Promotional poster featuring coaches Horan, Stefani, Legend, and McEntire
- Hosted by: Carson Daly
- Coaches: John Legend; Gwen Stefani; Niall Horan; Reba McEntire; Dan + Shay (guest)
- No. of contestants: 56 artists
- Winner: Huntley
- Winning coach: Niall Horan
- Runner-up: Ruby Leigh
- No. of episodes: 26

Release
- Original network: NBC
- Original release: September 25 – December 19, 2023

Season chronology
- ← Previous; Season 23 Next → Season 25

The twenty-fourth season of the American reality television series The Voice premiered on September 25, 2023, on NBC. The season is presented by Carson Daly, who returned for his twenty-fourth season as the host. This season's coaching panel consisted of Niall Horan, who returned for his second season; John Legend and Gwen Stefani, who both returned for their eighth and seventh seasons, respectively, after a one-season hiatus; and debuting coach Reba McEntire.

Huntley was named the winner of the season, marking Niall Horan's second consecutive win as a coach, with Horan becoming the third coach to win multiple consecutive seasons, following Blake Shelton's winning streak from seasons 2 to 4, and Kelly Clarkson's consecutive wins in seasons 14 and 15. Horan is also the second coach (after Clarkson) to win their first two seasons.

With Shelton's departure as a coach, the twenty-fourth season was the first not to feature any of the original coaches from the show's inaugural season.

== Overview ==
=== Development ===
On May 15, 2023, during NBC's upfronts for the 2023–24 United States network television schedule, it was announced that The Voice would return for a fall season later that year. The filming of the blind auditions began on July 10. Despite the season's inclusion of SAG-AFTRA members, such as John Legend and Reba McEntire, in its cast, the taping for the show was left unaffected when the union went on strike on July 14, as the show was covered under the union's Network Code, which is not subject to the contract negotiations between the union and the Alliance of Motion Picture and Television Producers.

On the announcement of NBC's 2023 fall schedule, on July 19, 2023, it was revealed that the season would premiere on September 25.

=== Coaches and host ===
Coaches and Host of The Voice Season 24

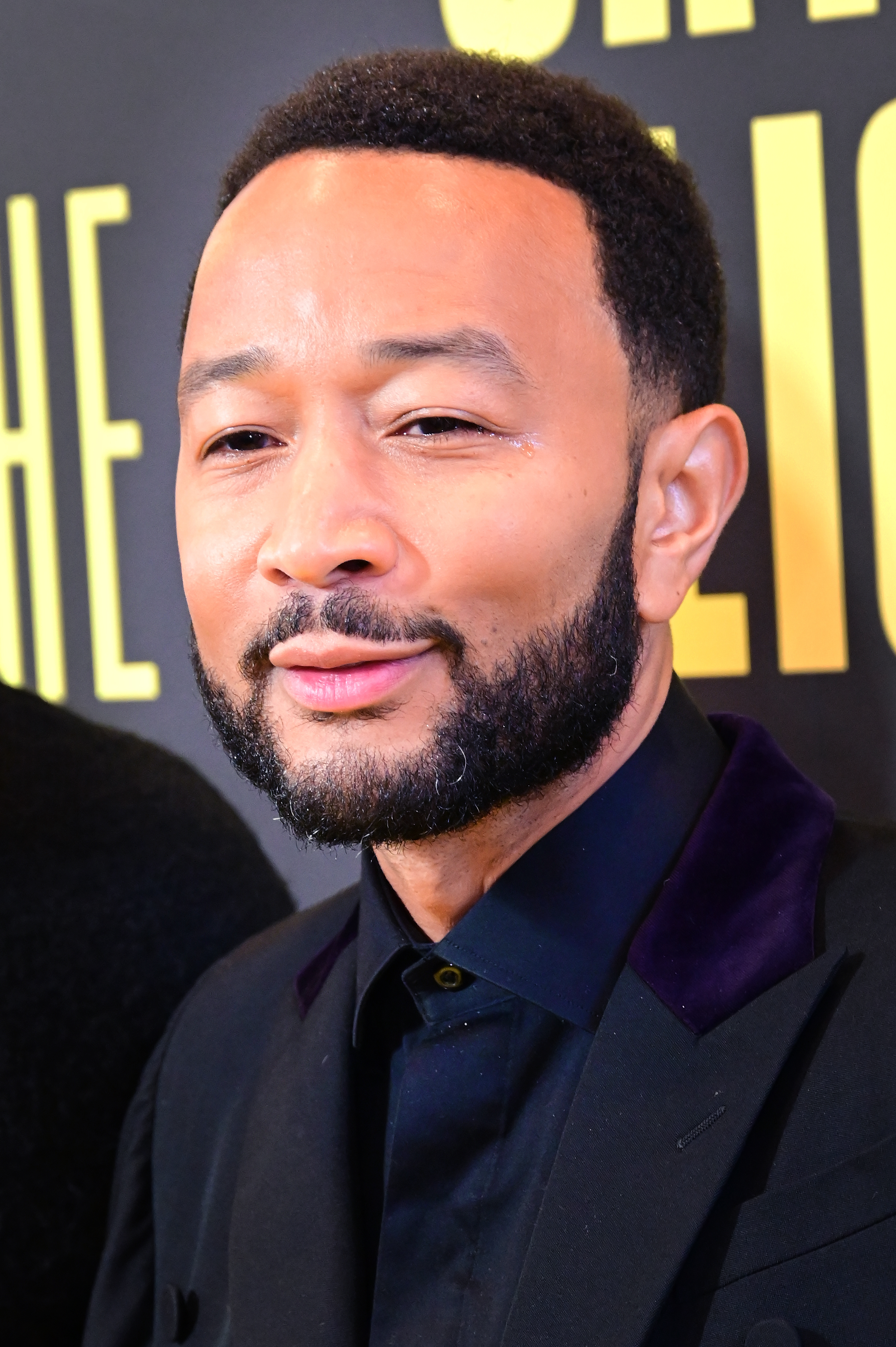
John Legend

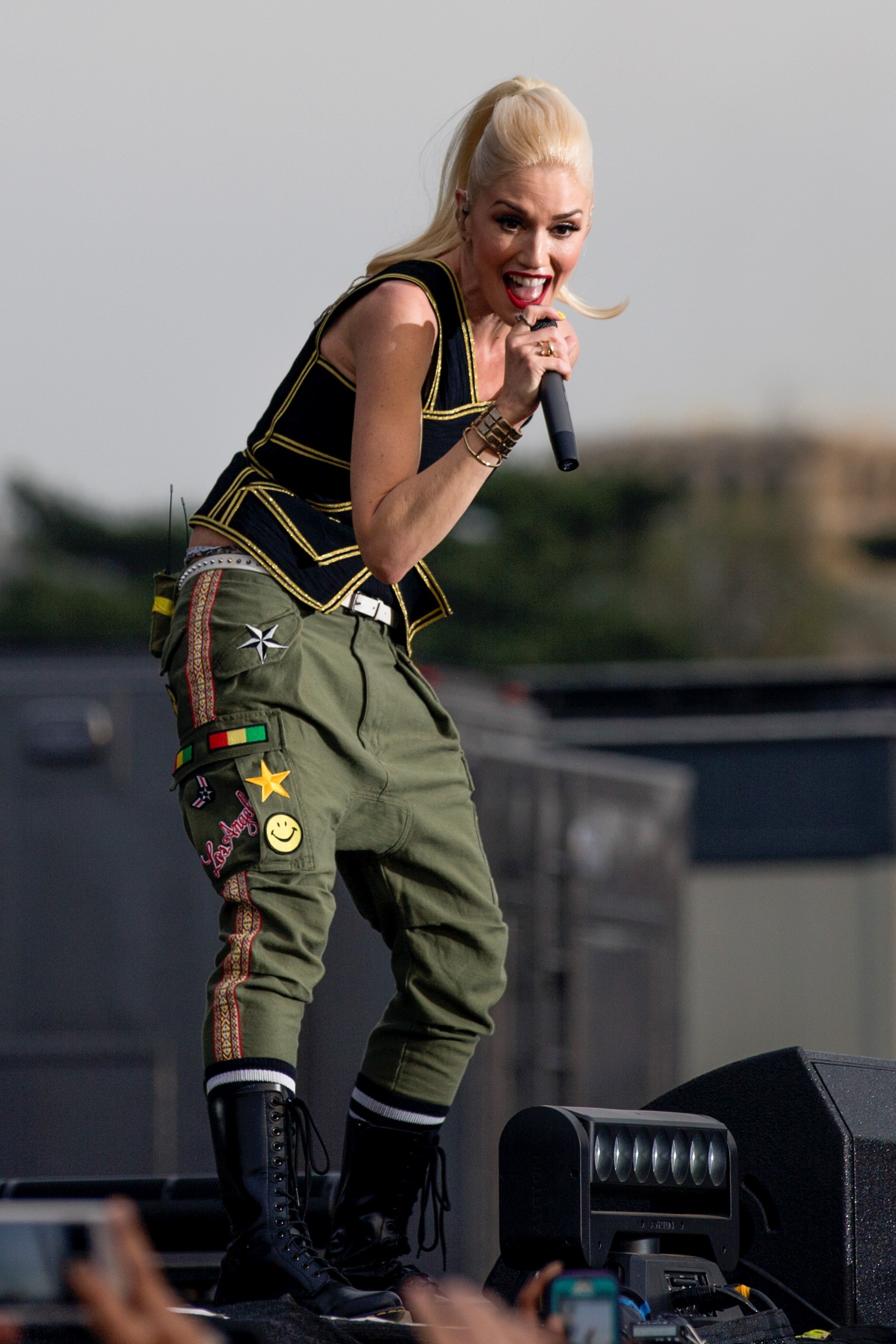
Gwen Stefani

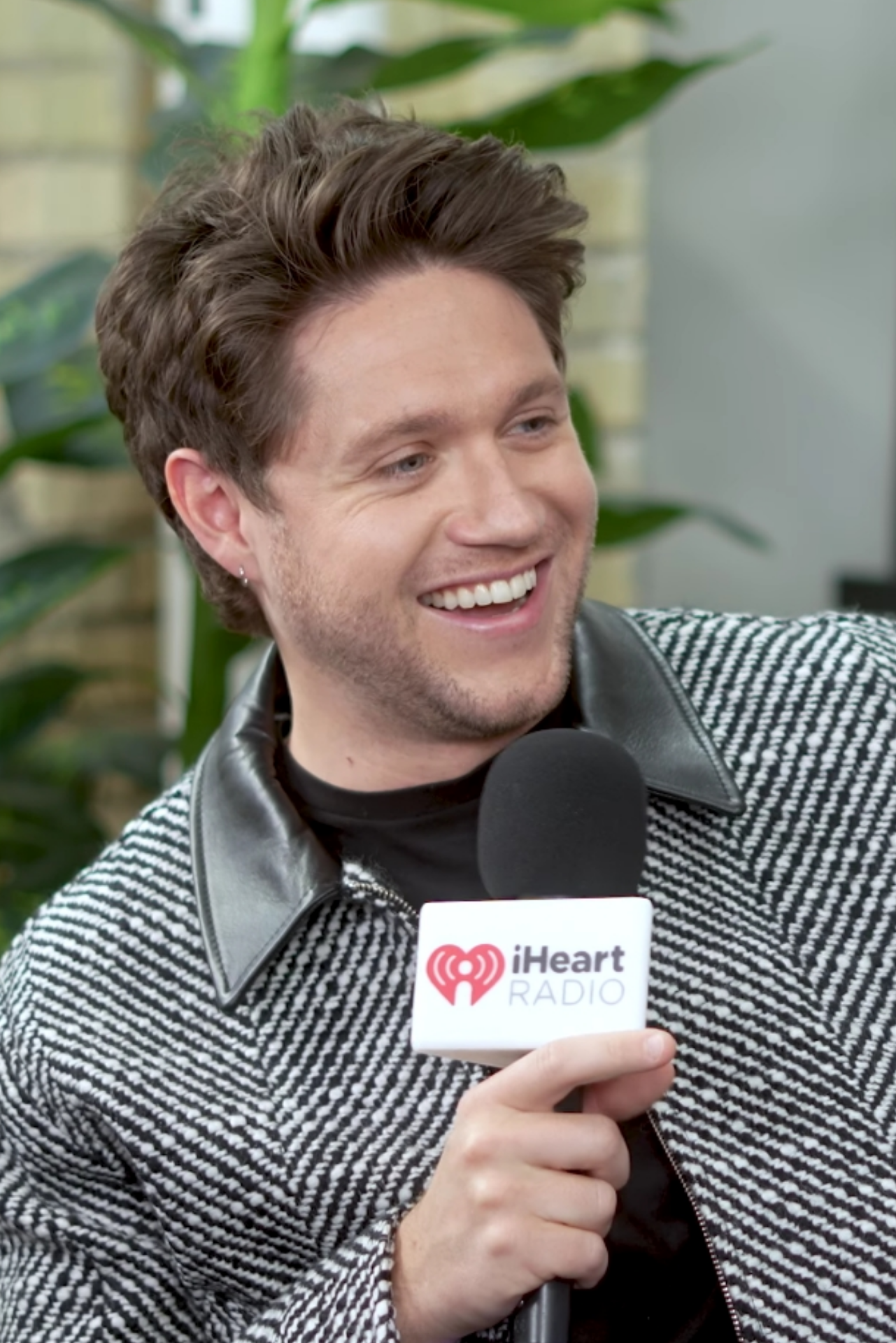
Niall Horan

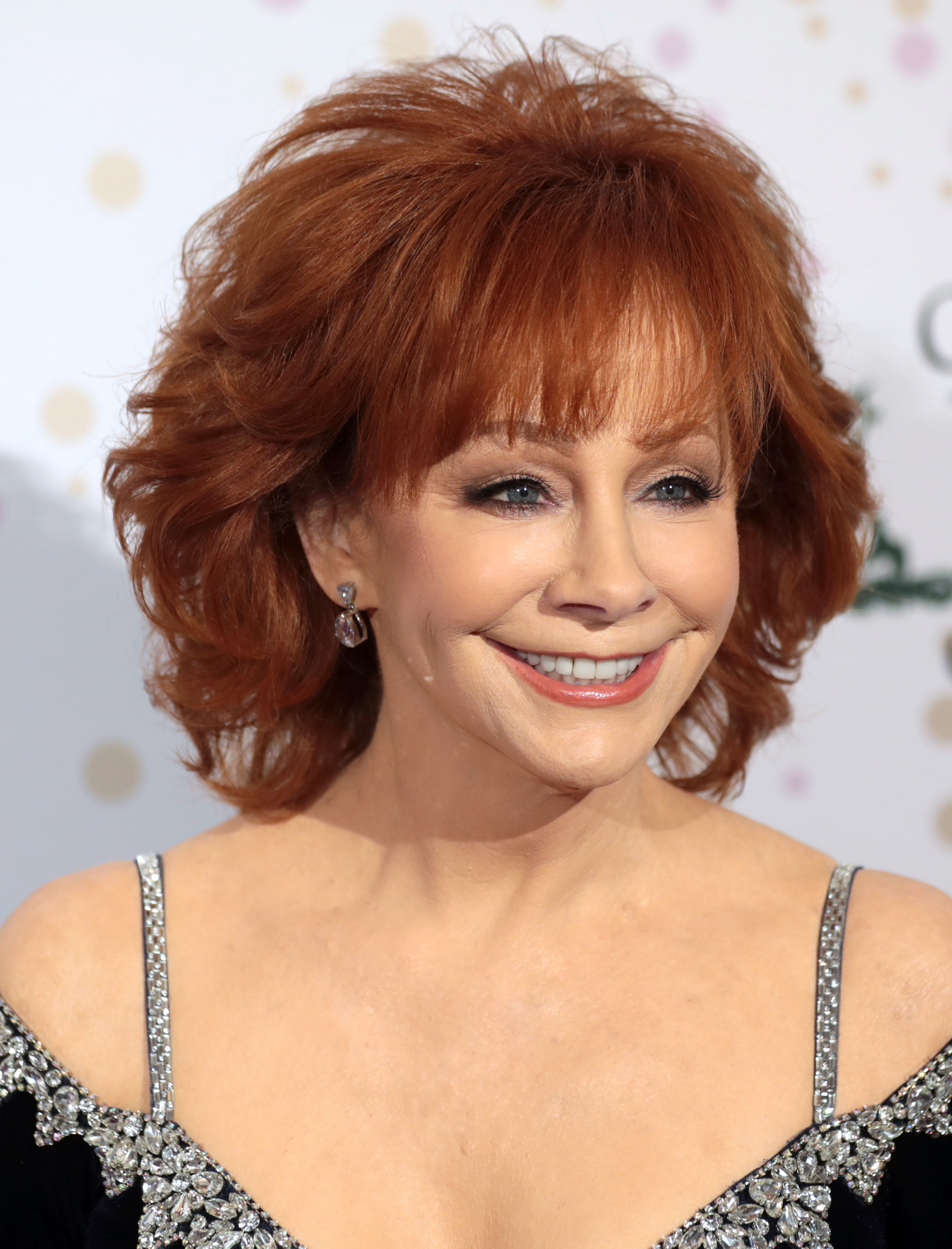
Reba McEntire

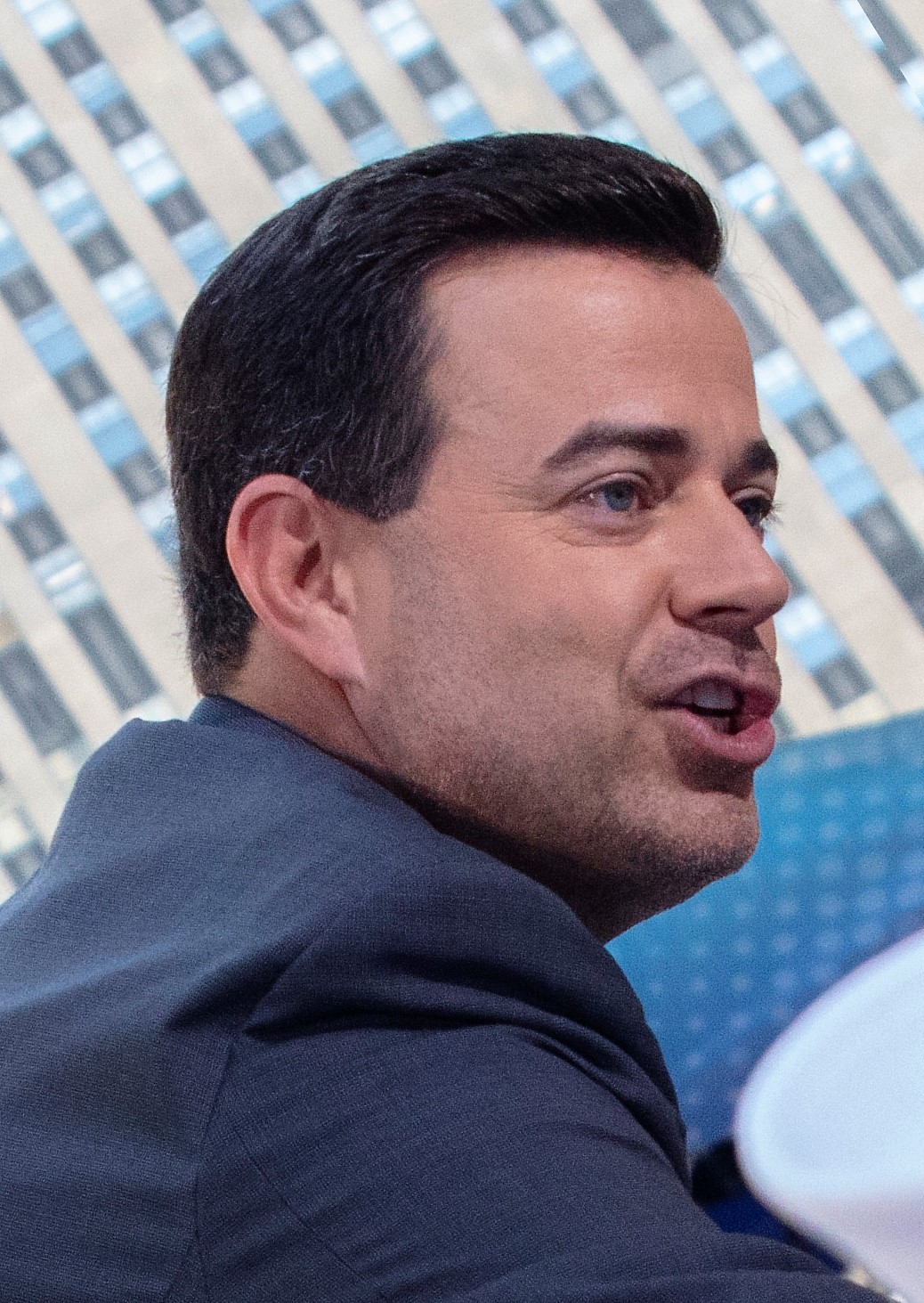
Carson Daly

Out of the four coaches that appeared in the previous season, only Niall Horan made a return, marking his second season as a coach. Coaches Kelly Clarkson, Chance the Rapper, and Blake Shelton, all left the panel for the season.

Shelton remarked in an interview with Access Hollywood that the previous season would be his last due to familial reasons. His departure makes the twenty-fourth season the first to not feature any of the coaches from the inaugural season. Meanwhile, Clarkson's departure comes amid her talk show's move to New York, as well as the allegations of a toxic work environment within it formed by its producers.

Former coaches John Legend and Gwen Stefani, who both last coached on season 22, returned for their eighth and seventh seasons, respectively.

During the semifinals of the previous season, it was revealed that country music singer and actress Reba McEntire would appear as a coach for her first season. McEntire previously made several appearances on the show—she served as the battle advisor for Team Blake on the show's inaugural season; an advisor for all teams during the Top 12 live shows on season eight; and as the mega mentor on season 23. She was also tapped to serve as a coach on the show's first season, but she declined. McEntire's history on the show, as well as her respected career in country music, have led several publications to identify her as Shelton's replacement. The addition of McEntire to the panel made history as the series’ oldest and most experienced coach. Adrianna Freedman of Good Housekeeping noted that McEntire's inclusion as a coach garnered a positive response from longtime viewers.

Carson Daly returned as the host for his twenty-fourth season.

==== Substitutions ====
Due to scheduling conflicts, Horan was not present for rehearsals for the knockouts. Filling in for him was country music duo Dan + Shay, who then served as full-time coaches in the following season. The pair previously made several appearances on the show — appearing as guest performers on the live shows in seasons 15 and 19, and serving as the battle advisors for Team Blake in season 20.

=== Mega mentor ===
On October 31, 2023, it was announced that country music singer Wynonna Judd would serve as the mega mentor for the Knockouts. For the second consecutive season, there were no guest advisors in the battles, meaning the artists were solely mentored by their coaches.

=== Marketing and promotion ===
A preview of the season was first aired on August 31, 2023. Ahead of the season's premiere, on September 22, the show, via its online media platforms, released a cover of the 1972 Eagles single "Take It Easy" performed by the coaches.

Shortly prior to the season premiere, the blind audition of Jordan Rainer, performing the Bobbie Gentry song "Fancy" based on McEntire's 1992 cover of the song, was released online. Later episodes saw the auditions of Ephraim Owens, Chechi Sarai, Laura Williams, Nini Iris, Olivia Eden, and Dylan Carter released online as a sneak peek for their respective episodes.

== Teams ==
Teams color key
Winner	Selected by another coach as their 'super save'
Runner-up	Stolen in the Knockouts
Third place	Eliminated in the Knockouts
Fourth place	Stolen in the Battles
Fifth place	Eliminated in the Battles
Eliminated in the Live shows	Contestant withdrew
Eliminated in the Playoffs

Coaches' teams
Coach	Top 56 Artists					
John Legend						
John Legend	Lila Forde	Mac Royals	AZÁN	Kristen Brown	Taylor Deneen	Kaylee Shimizu
John Legend	~~Mara Justine~~	~~Stee~~	Brandon Montel	Caleb Sasser	Deejay Young	~~Elizabeth Evans~~
John Legend	~~AZÁN~~	~~Claudia B.~~	Willie Gomez	Ephraim Owens	Talakai	JaRae Womack
Gwen Stefani						
Gwen Stefani	BIAS	Tanner Massey	Kara Tenae	Rudi	Stee	Lennon VanderDoes
Gwen Stefani	~~Kristen Brown~~	Jason Arcilla	CORii.	Jenna Marquis	Chechi Sarai	~~Brandon Montel~~
Gwen Stefani	~~Jacquie Roar~~	Claire Heilig	Joslynn Rose	Juliette Ojeda	Calla Prejean	Eli Ward
Niall Horan						
Niall Horan	Huntley	Mara Justine	Nini Iris	Claudia B.	Julia Roome	Alexa Wildish
Niall Horan	~~AZÁN~~	~~Lennon VanderDoes~~	~~Noah Spencer~~	Olivia Minogue	~~Tanner Massey~~	Olivia Eden
Niall Horan	Sophia Hoffman	Brailey Lenderman	LVNDR	Laura Williams	Reid Zingale	
Reba McEntire						
Reba McEntire	Ruby Leigh	Jacquie Roar	Jordan Rainer	Ms. Monét	Noah Spencer	Tom Nitti
Reba McEntire	Elizabeth Evans	Alison Albrecht	Rachele Nguyen	Caitlin Quisenberry	~~CORii.~~	~~Mac Royals~~
Reba McEntire	Al Boogie	Dylan Carter	Angelina Nazarian	Crystal Nicole	Jackson Snelling	
Note: Italicized names are artists stolen from another team during the battles or the knockouts (names struck through within former teams). Underlined names are artists saved by their coach in the knockouts. Double Underlined names are recipients of the 'super save'.

== Blind auditions ==
The show began with the Blind Auditions on September 25, 2023. In each audition, an artist sings their piece in front of the coaches, whose chairs are facing the audience. If a coach is interested in working with the artist, they may press their button to face the artist. If a singular coach presses the button, the artist automatically becomes part of their team. If multiple coaches turn, they will compete for the artist, who will decide which team they will join. Each coach has one "block" to prevent another coach from getting an artist. This season, each coach ends up with 14 artists by the end of the blind auditions, creating a total of 56 artists advancing to the battles.

This is the second consecutive season (fourth overall) in The Voice history where at least one coach (John Legend and Niall Horan in this instance) had no one-chair turns on their teams. The others were Adam Levine and Pharrell Williams in season 7, Legend in season 17, and Clarkson in the previous season. (This is also the season with the most four-chair turns, with 20 total 4-chair turns.)

With Reba McEntire having four 4-chair turn contestants, she tied with Camila Cabello in which a debuting coach has the most 4-chair turns in their season.

Blind auditions color key
✔	Coach hit his/her "I WANT YOU" button
	Artist defaulted to this coach's team
	Artist selected to join this coach's team
	Artist was eliminated with no coach pressing their button
✘	Coach pressed "I WANT YOU" button, but was blocked by another coach from getting the artist
	Blocked by John; Blocked by Gwen; Blocked by Niall; Blocked by Reba

=== Episode 1 (September 25) ===
Among this episode's auditionees were Sophia Hoffman, who previously auditioned unsuccessfully in season 23; and Mara Justine, who previously competed on the 9th season of America's Got Talent and the 16th season of American Idol.

First blind audition results
Order	Artist	Age	Hometown	Song	Coach's and artist's choices			
Order	Artist	Age	Hometown	Song	John	Gwen	Niall	Reba
1	Jordan Rainer	33	Atoka, Oklahoma	"Fancy"	✔	✔	✔	✔
2	Joslynn Rose	16	Lake Benton, Minnesota	"Arcade"	–	✔	✔	✔
3	Deejay Young	33	Tampa, Florida	"This Woman's Work"	✔	✔	–	✔
4	Sophia Hoffman	18	Chula Vista, California	"Tell Me You Love Me"	–	–	✔	✔
5	Sam Dearie	20	Lebanon, Ohio	"Walkin' After Midnight"	–	–	–	–
6	Jackson Snelling	21	Austin, Indiana	"If Heaven Wasn't So Far Away"	–	✔	–	✔
7	Alexa Wildish	34	Orange County, California	"Songbird"	✔	✔	✔	✔
8	Olivia Minogue	19	Lockport, Illinois	"Lay Me Down"	✔	–	✔	✔
9	Jarred Billups	30	Fayette, Alabama	"Let's Stay Together"	–	–	–	–
10	Kristen Brown	24	Roseville, California	"Blown Away"	–	✔	–	✔
11	Mara Justine	21	Galloway, New Jersey	"Goodbye Yellow Brick Road" (Note: Justine and Legend later performed a duet of the song "All of Me.")	✔	✔	✔	✔

=== Episode 2 (September 26) ===
Second blind auditions results
Order	Artist	Age	Hometown	Song	Coach's and artist's choices			
Order	Artist	Age	Hometown	Song	John	Gwen	Niall	Reba
1	Ruby Leigh	16	Foley, Missouri	"I Wanna Be a Cowboy's Sweetheart"	✔	✔	✔	✔
2	Juliette Ojeda	20	Hialeah, Florida	"Hopelessly Devoted to You"	–	✔	✔	✔
3	Julia Roome	13	Warwick, New York	"Dream a Little Dream of Me"	–	✔	✔	–
4	Ayvio (Ashleigh Overby) (Note: Presented onscreen in all caps.)	36	Lawton, Oklahoma	"Forget You"	–	–	–	–
5	Jenna Marquis	19	Simi Valley, California	"Teenage Dirtbag"	✔	✔	✔	–
6	Ephraim Owens	36	Indianapolis, Indiana	"Beneath Your Beautiful"	✔	✔	✔	✔

=== Episode 3 (October 2) ===
Among this episode's auditionees were Mac Royals, who previously competed under his real name, Malcolm Allen, on the 13th season of American Idol; and Rudi Gutierrez, who previously competed on The Bachelor Presents: Listen to Your Heart.

With the acquisitions of Chechi Sarai and Rudi Gutierrez, Gwen Stefani obtained her first two four-chair-turns since Joshua "JChosen" Hunter and Troy Ramey in the twelfth season.

Third blind audition results
Order	Artist	Age	Hometown	Song	Coach's and artist's choices			
Order	Artist	Age	Hometown	Song	John	Gwen	Niall	Reba
1	Stee (Sterlin Colvin Jr.)	34	Bluffton, South Carolina	"Sugar"	✔	✔	✘	✔
2	Chechi Sarai	32	Pontiac, Michigan	"Lovin' You"	✔	✔	✔	✔
3	Reid Zingale	27	Nashville, Tennessee	"July"	✔	✔	✔	–
4	Gillian Smith	20	Mechanicsburg, Pennsylvania	"Heart Like a Truck"	–	–	–	–
5	Claudia B. (Claudia Swope)	24	Washington, D.C.	"Human Nature"	✔	–	✔	✔
6	Mac Royals (Malcolm Allen)	30	Wrightsville, Arkansas	"Gravity"	✔	✔	✔	✔
7	Noah Spencer	20	Richlands, Virginia	"Something in the Orange"	–	✔	✔	✔
8	Tom Nitti	31	New Hartford, New York	"Signed, Sealed, Delivered (I'm Yours)"	–	–	–	✔
9	Alison Albrecht	23	Novi, Michigan	"Ironic"	–	–	–	✔
10	Talakai (DeAngelo Watson)	34	Sacramento, California	"Stay with Me"	✔	–	–	✔
11	Iceberg (Charlotte Berg)	34	Essex, New York	"I Will Follow You into the Dark"	–	–	–	–
12	Rudi (Rudi Gutierrez)	28	San Antonio, Texas	"You Don't Own Me"	✘	✔	✔	✔

=== Episode 4 (October 3) ===
Fourth blind audition results
Order	Artist	Age	Hometown	Song	Coach's and artist's choices			
Order	Artist	Age	Hometown	Song	John	Gwen	Niall	Reba
1	Laura Williams	20	Quakertown, Pennsylvania	"Fingers Crossed"	✔	✔	✔	✔
2	Ms. Monét (Conesha Monét Owens)	50	Pittsburg, California	"Higher Love"	–	✔	–	✔
3	Jason Arcilla	34	Kahului, Hawaii	"Dreams"	–	✔	–	✘
4	Giuliana Amaral	21	New Bedford, Massachusetts	"Rainbow in the Dark"	–	–	–	–
5	Kaylee Shimizu	17	ʻEwa Beach, Hawaii	"Golden Slumbers"	✔	✔	✔	✔
6	Bias (Grant Bias)	23	Chattanooga, Tennessee	"God's Country"	–	✔	–	✔
7	David Simmons Jr.	40	Kansas City, Missouri	"Tainted Love"	–	–	–	–
8	Rachele Nguyen	17	Lakewood, California	"Bleeding Love"	–	–	–	✔
9	Lvndr (Lindsey Garcia)	27	Memphis, Tennessee	"Hotline Bling"	✔	–	✔	–
10	Walking Eagle (Brett Walking Eagle)	27	Fairfax, Virginia	"Everybody Wants to Rule the World"	–	–	–	–
11	Jacquie Roar (Jacquie Butler)	37	North Plains, Oregon	"Here for the Party"	✔	✔	✔	✔

=== Episode 5 (October 9) ===
Among this episode's auditionees were Al Boogie, who previously auditioned unsuccessfully in season 23; Corii, who previously appeared on season 2 of Songland; and Nini Iris, who previously competed in the first season of The Voice Georgia under her real name, Nini Bregvadze.

Fifth blind audition results
Order	Artist	Age	Hometown	Song	Coach's and artist's choices			
Order	Artist	Age	Hometown	Song	John	Gwen	Niall	Reba
1	Lila Forde	24	Seattle, Washington	"Can't Find My Way Home"	✔	✔	✔	✔
2	Angelina Nazarian	17	Ann Arbor, Michigan	"The Trouble with Love Is"	–	–	✔	✔
3	Tanner Massey	19	Choctaw, Oklahoma	"Before You Go"	–	✔	✔	✔
4	Ange (Andrew Lucier)	23	St. Louis, Missouri	"Heaven"	–	–	–	–
5	JaRae Womack	35	Miami, Florida	"Back to Black"	✔	✔	✔	✔
6	Brandon Montel	29	Memphis, Tennessee	"Hard Place"	✘	✔	✔	✔
7	Peter Pinnock	27	Manatee County, Florida	"Your Man"	–	–	–	–
8	Al Boogie	37	Mansfield, Louisiana	"Pickup Man"	–	–	–	✔
9	Corii (Courtney Halpin MacBride) (Note: Presented onscreen as CORii.)	32	Moorestown, New Jersey	"Scared to Be Lonely"	–	–	–	✔
10	Crystal Nicole	39	Atlanta, Georgia	"Only Girl (In the World)"	–	–	–	✔
11	Elizabeth Evans	22	Arlington, Texas	"All I Wanted"	✔	–	–	✔
12	Jordan Grace	31	Nashville, Tennessee / Australia	"Let Her Go"	–	–	–	–
13	Nini Iris (Nini Bregvadze)	27	Brooklyn, New York / Georgia	"I See Red"	✔	✔	✔	✔

=== Episode 6 (October 10) ===
Among this episode's auditionees was Olivia Eden who competed under her real name, Olivia Acosta, on Chopped Jr in 2017 and Top Chef Jr in 2018. [99]

Sixth blind audition results
Order	Artist	Age	Hometown	Song	Coach's and artist's choices			
Order	Artist	Age	Hometown	Song	John	Gwen	Niall	Reba
1	Willie Gomez	37	Miami, Florida	"La Bachata"	✔	✔	✔	✔
2	Olivia Eden (Olivia Acosta)	15	Long Valley, New Jersey	"This Town"	–	–	✔	✔
3	Caitlin Quisenberry	27	Denver, Colorado	"Rainbow"	–	✔	–	✔
4	Clayton Davis	34	Chattanooga, Tennessee	"Sunday Morning"	–	–	–	–
5	Kara Tenae	33	Riverside, California	"Boo'd Up"	–	✔	✔	✔
6	Caleb Sasser	27	Goldsboro, North Carolina	"Another Sad Love Song"	✔	✔	✔	✔

=== Episode 7 (October 16) ===
Among this episode's auditionees were Claire Heilig, who previously competed on the 26th season of The Bachelor; and Katie Wheatley, who previously auditioned unsuccessfully in season 23 (though her audition went unaired).

Seventh blind audition results
Order	Artist	Age	Hometown	Song	Coach's and artist's choices			
Order	Artist	Age	Hometown	Song	John	Gwen	Niall	Reba
1	Huntley (Michael Huntley)	33	Fredericksburg, Virginia	"She Talks to Angels"	✔	✔	✔	✔
2	Azán (Alexandria Hyson-Stewart)	28	Austin, Texas	"Golden"	✔	–	–	✔
3	Eli Ward	21	Waterloo, Illinois	"Bruises"	–	✔	–	✔
4	Brailey Lenderman	33	Roswell, Georgia	"If It Makes You Happy"	–	✔	✔	–
5	Colby Cobb	19	Centre, Alabama	"Somebody Else"	–	–	–	–
6	Dylan Carter	20	St. George, South Carolina	"I Look to You"	✔	✔	✔	✔
7	Claire Heilig	30	Virginia Beach, Virginia	"Tennessee Orange"	–	✔	–	Team full
8	Lennon VanderDoes	27	Wilmington, Delaware	"The Night We Met"	✔	✔	✔	Team full
9	Taylor Deneen	23	Midwest City, Oklahoma	"Redbone"	✔	✔	Team full	Team full
10	Katie Wheatley	27	Owasso, Oklahoma	"The Middle"	Team full	–	Team full	Team full
11	Calla Prejean	22	Houston, Texas	"You're So Vain"	Team full	✔	Team full	Team full

== Battles ==
The second stage of the show, the battles, aired from October 17 through November 6, 2023, comprising episodes 8 through 13. In this round, the coaches pitted two of their artists in a singing match and then select one of them to advance to the next round. For the second consecutive season, there were no guest advisors for the battles, which meant the artists were mentored solely by their coaches.

Losing artists may be "stolen" by another coach, becoming new members of their team. Multiple coaches can attempt to steal an artist, resulting in a competition for the artist, who will ultimately decide which team they will join. At the end of this round, nine artists remained on each team; seven were the battle winners, while the other two were stolen from another coach. In total, 36 artists advanced to the knockouts.

For the first time since season 16, there were two steals in this round, with no saves available since season 8.

Battles color key
Artist won the battle and advanced to the knockouts
Artist lost the battle, but was stolen by another coach and advanced to the knockouts
Artist lost the battle and was eliminated

Battles results
Episode	Coach	Order	Winner	Song	Loser	'Steal' result			
Episode	Coach	Order	Winner	Song	Loser	John	Gwen	Niall	Reba
Episode 8 (Tuesday, October 17, 2023)	John	1	Deejay Young	"Cry Me a River"	Ephraim Owens	N/A	–	–	–
Episode 8 (Tuesday, October 17, 2023)	Reba	2	Jordan Rainer	"The Heart Won't Lie"	Jackson Snelling	–	–	–	N/A
Episode 8 (Tuesday, October 17, 2023)	Niall	3	Lennon VanderDoes	"She's Always a Woman"	Tanner Massey	✔	✔	N/A	–
Episode 9 (Monday, October 23, 2023)	Gwen	1	BIAS	"Need a Favor"	Jacquie Roar	–	N/A	–	✔
Episode 9 (Monday, October 23, 2023)	Reba	2	Alison Albrecht	"You Say"	Angelina Nazarian	–	–	–	N/A
Episode 9 (Monday, October 23, 2023)	Niall	3	Julia Roome	"Kiss Me"	Olivia Eden	–	–	N/A	–
Episode 9 (Monday, October 23, 2023)	John	4	Stee	"Tacones Rojos"	Willie Gomez	N/A	–	–	–
Episode 9 (Monday, October 23, 2023)	Gwen	5	Kristen Brown	"That's the Way It Is"	Juliette Ojeda	–	N/A	–	–
Episode 9 (Monday, October 23, 2023)	Reba	6	Ms. Monét	"New Attitude"	CORii.	–	✔	✔	N/A
Episode 10 (Tuesday, October 24, 2023)	Niall	1	Nini Iris	"Heart of Glass"	Sophia Hoffman	–	Team full	N/A	–
Episode 10 (Tuesday, October 24, 2023)	Gwen	2	Chechi Sarai	"I'll Never Love Again"	Calla Prejean	–	Team full	–	–
Episode 10 (Tuesday, October 24, 2023)	John	3	Caleb Sasser	"Too Good at Goodbyes"	Talakai	N/A	Team full	–	–
Episode 10 (Tuesday, October 24, 2023)	John	4	Lila Forde	"Killing Me Softly with His Song"	JaRae Womack	N/A	Team full	–	–
Episode 10 (Tuesday, October 24, 2023)	Reba	5	Rachele Nguyen	"How Deep Is Your Love"	Mac Royals	✔	Team full	–	N/A
Episode 11 (Monday, October 30, 2023)	Reba	1	Ruby Leigh	"Jolene"	Al Boogie	–	Team full	–	N/A
Episode 11 (Monday, October 30, 2023)	Gwen	2	Rudi	"My Immortal"	Joslynn Rose	–	Team full	–	–
Episode 11 (Monday, October 30, 2023)	Niall	3	Noah Spencer	"Lego House"	Reid Zingale	–	Team full	N/A	–
Episode 11 (Monday, October 30, 2023)	John	4	Taylor Deneen	"Do It"	AZÁN	N/A	Team full	✔	✔
Episode 11 (Monday, October 30, 2023)	Niall	5	Alexa Wildish	"Everything I Wanted"	LVNDR	–	Team full	N/A	–
Episode 11 (Monday, October 30, 2023)	Gwen	6	Jenna Marquis	"Flowers"	Claire Heilig	–	Team full	–	–
Episode 11 (Monday, October 30, 2023)	John	7	Kaylee Shimizu	"Traitor"	Elizabeth Evans	N/A	Team full	–	✔
Episode 12 (Tuesday, October 31, 2023)	Reba	1	Tom Nitti	"'Til You Can't"	Dylan Carter	–	Team full	–	Team full
Episode 12 (Tuesday, October 31, 2023)	Niall	2	Olivia Minogue	"Ghost"	Laura Williams	–	Team full	N/A	Team full
Episode 12 (Tuesday, October 31, 2023)	Gwen	3	Jason Arcilla	"Make It with You"	Eli Ward	–	Team full	–	Team full
Episode 12 (Tuesday, October 31, 2023)	John	4	Mara Justine	"Son of a Preacher Man"	Claudia B.	N/A	Team full	✔	Team full
Episode 13 (Monday, November 6, 2023)	Niall	1	Huntley	"Hold My Hand"	Brailey Lenderman	–	Team full	Team full	Team full
Episode 13 (Monday, November 6, 2023)	Reba	2	Caitlin Quisenberry	"The Song Remembers When"	Crystal Nicole	–	Team full	Team full	Team full
Episode 13 (Monday, November 6, 2023)	Gwen	3	Kara Tenae	"Have You Ever?"	Brandon Montel	✔	Team full	Team full	Team full

== Knockouts ==
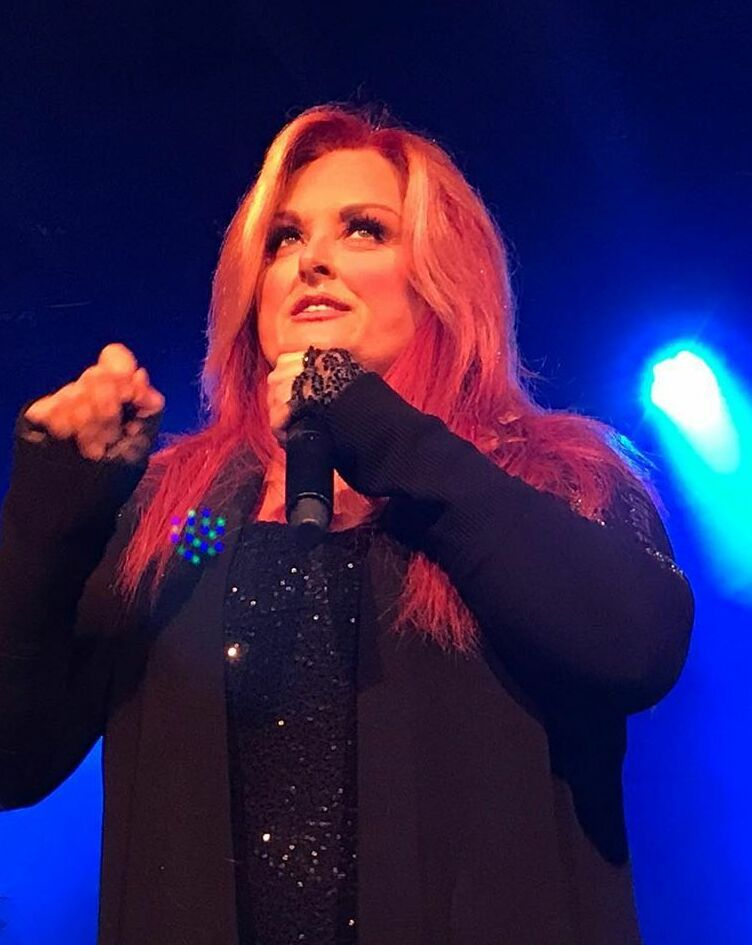
Wynonna Judd served as the mega mentor for the round.

The third stage of the show, the knockouts, aired after the final battles on November 6, and ran through November 14, 2023, comprising episodes thirteen through sixteen. Wynonna Judd served as this season's mega mentor. In the round, each coach groups three of their artists in a singing match. The artists themselves will select the song they will sing in the round, and then their coach selects one of them to advance to the playoffs.

Throughout the round, each coach can steal one losing artist from an opposing team and save one of their artists. At the end of the round, 12 artists won their knockout, remaining on their teams, while four artists are stolen, and an additional four are saved by their respective coaches. Each coach also granted a "super save" to an artist, regardless of team, to allow them to advance to the playoffs as members of their team. In all, a total 24 artists advanced to the playoffs.

Knockouts color key
Artist won the knockout and advanced to the playoffs
Artist lost the knockout, but was stolen by another coach and advanced to the playoffs
Artist lost the knockout, but was saved by their coach and advanced to the playoffs
Artist lost the knockout and was eliminated
Artist lost the knockout and was originally eliminated, but received the 'super save' and advanced to the playoffs

Knockouts results
Episode	Coach	Order	Winner		Losers		'Steal'/'Save' result			
Episode	Coach	Order	Song	Artist	Artist	Song	John	Gwen	Niall	Reba
Episode 13 (Monday, November 6, 2023)	Reba	1	"Girl"	Jacquie Roar	Alison Albrecht	"It's Too Late"	–	–	–	–
Episode 13 (Monday, November 6, 2023)	Reba	1	"Girl"	Jacquie Roar	Tom Nitti	"(I Know) I'm Losing You"	–	✔	–	✔
Episode 13 (Monday, November 6, 2023)	John	2	"Ain't No Way"	Kaylee Shimizu	Caleb Sasser	"Jealous"	–	–	–	–
Episode 13 (Monday, November 6, 2023)	John	2	"Ain't No Way"	Kaylee Shimizu	Mara Justine	"Without You"	–	✔	✔	–
Episode 14 (Tuesday, November 7, 2023)	Niall	1	"Karma Police"	Nini Iris	Olivia Minogue	"Bring Me to Life"	–	–	–	–
Episode 14 (Tuesday, November 7, 2023)	Niall	1	"Karma Police"	Nini Iris	AZÁN (Note: Rejoined Team Legend for the playoffs.)	"Caught Up in the Rapture"	–	–	–	–
Episode 14 (Tuesday, November 7, 2023)	Gwen	2	"In My Blood"	Tanner Massey	Chechi Sarai	"Never Can Say Goodbye"	–	–	N/A	–
Episode 14 (Tuesday, November 7, 2023)	Gwen	2	"In My Blood"	Tanner Massey	Rudi	"Smokin out the Window"	✔	✔	N/A	✔
Episode 15 (Monday, November 13, 2023)	John	1	"Fire and Rain"	Lila Forde	Deejay Young	"Breakin' My Heart"	–	–	N/A	–
Episode 15 (Monday, November 13, 2023)	John	1	"Fire and Rain"	Lila Forde	Stee	"Pretty Wings"	–	✔	N/A	–
Episode 15 (Monday, November 13, 2023)	Gwen	2	"You Should Probably Leave"	BIAS	Jenna Marquis	"Complicated"	–	Team full	N/A	–
Episode 15 (Monday, November 13, 2023)	Gwen	2	"You Should Probably Leave"	BIAS	Jason Arcilla	"Roxanne"	–	Team full	N/A	–
Episode 15 (Monday, November 13, 2023)	Niall	3	"Wanted Dead or Alive"	Huntley	Claudia B.	"Don't Know Why"	✔	Team full	✔	–
Episode 15 (Monday, November 13, 2023)	Niall	3	"Wanted Dead or Alive"	Huntley	Noah Spencer	"Where Rainbows Never Die"	✔	Team full	Team full	✔
Episode 15 (Monday, November 13, 2023)	Reba	4	"Blue"	Ruby Leigh	Rachele Nguyen	"Die from a Broken Heart"	–	Team full	Team full	Team full
Episode 15 (Monday, November 13, 2023)	Reba	4	"Blue"	Ruby Leigh	Ms. Monét	"Best of My Love"	–	Team full	Team full	Team full
Episode 15 (Monday, November 13, 2023)	Gwen	5	"Leave (Get Out)"	Kara Tenae	CORii.	"Ain't it Fun"	–	Team full	Team full	Team full
Episode 15 (Monday, November 13, 2023)	Gwen	5	"Leave (Get Out)"	Kara Tenae	Kristen Brown	"This One's for the Girls"	✔	Team full	Team full	Team full
Episode 16 (Tuesday, November 14, 2023)	John	1	"Lost Without U"	Mac Royals	Brandon Montel	"Nobody Gets Me"	–	Team full	Team full	Team full
Episode 16 (Tuesday, November 14, 2023)	John	1	"Lost Without U"	Mac Royals	Taylor Deneen	"Sweet Thing"	✔	Team full	Team full	Team full
Episode 16 (Tuesday, November 14, 2023)	Reba	2	"Hole in the Bottle"	Jordan Rainer	Elizabeth Evans	"You Broke Me First"	Team full	Team full	Team full	Team full
Episode 16 (Tuesday, November 14, 2023)	Reba	2	"Hole in the Bottle"	Jordan Rainer	Caitlin Quisenberry	"Lady Like"	Team full	Team full	Team full	Team full
Episode 16 (Tuesday, November 14, 2023)	Niall	3	"Believe"	Alexa Wildish	Julia Roome	"Unstoppable"	Team full	Team full	Team full	Team full
Episode 16 (Tuesday, November 14, 2023)	Niall	3	"Believe"	Alexa Wildish	Lennon VanderDoes (Note: Joined Team Gwen for the playoffs.)	"I Won't Give Up"	Team full	Team full	Team full	Team full

== Playoffs ==
The fourth stage of the show, the playoffs, aired from November 21 through November 28, 2023, comprising episodes eighteen through twenty. The round was preceded by a recap episode titled "The Road To Playoffs".

New to season 24 is the Super Save, which saw the return of eliminated contestants Azán, Ms. Monét, Julia Roome, and Lennon VanderDoes as recipients for Team Legend, Team Reba, Team Niall, and Team Gwen, respectively.

The top 24 artists perform for the coaches with a song of their choosing. At the end of the round, each coach selects three of their artists to advance, creating a total of 12 artists advancing to the live shows.

Like season 6, season 13, and the previous season, the playoffs were not contested live. They were prerecorded and taped at the same stage as the prior three rounds, hence the lack of an interactive viewer voting component or a subsequent results episode.

In episode 19, Tom Nitti from Team Reba withdrew from the show due to undisclosed personal reasons; this left the remaining five members of Reba's team to perform on the episode.

Playoffs color key
Artist was chosen by their coach to move on to the live shows
Artist was eliminated

Playoffs results
Episode	Coach	Order	Artist	Song	Result
Episode 18 (Tuesday, November 21, 2023)	Niall Horan	1	Nini Iris	"River"	Advanced
Episode 18 (Tuesday, November 21, 2023)	Niall Horan	2	Claudia B.	"Talking to the Moon"	Eliminated
Episode 18 (Tuesday, November 21, 2023)	Niall Horan	3	Huntley	"Daylight"	Advanced
Episode 18 (Tuesday, November 21, 2023)	Niall Horan	4	Julia Roome	"True Colors"	Eliminated
Episode 18 (Tuesday, November 21, 2023)	Niall Horan	5	Mara Justine	"You've Got the Love"	Advanced
Episode 18 (Tuesday, November 21, 2023)	Niall Horan	6	Alexa Wildish	"Fields of Gold"	Eliminated
Episode 19 (Monday, November 27, 2023)	Reba McEntire	1	Jordan Rainer	"Boondocks"	Advanced
Episode 19 (Monday, November 27, 2023)	Reba McEntire	2	Ms. Monét	"Until You Come Back to Me"	Eliminated
Episode 19 (Monday, November 27, 2023)	Reba McEntire	3	Jacquie Roar	"The Chain"	Advanced
Episode 19 (Monday, November 27, 2023)	Reba McEntire	4	Noah Spencer	"Jolene"	Eliminated
Episode 19 (Monday, November 27, 2023)	Reba McEntire	5	Ruby Leigh	"Long, Long Time"	Advanced
Episode 19 (Monday, November 27, 2023)	Gwen Stefani	6	Stee	"Shut Up and Dance"	Eliminated
Episode 19 (Monday, November 27, 2023)	Gwen Stefani	7	BIAS	"Where I Find God"	Advanced
Episode 19 (Monday, November 27, 2023)	Gwen Stefani	8	Rudi	"My All / Mi Todo"	Eliminated
Episode 19 (Monday, November 27, 2023)	Gwen Stefani	9	Tanner Massey	"Impossible"	Advanced
Episode 19 (Monday, November 27, 2023)	Gwen Stefani	10	Lennon VanderDoes	"Falling Slowly"	Eliminated
Episode 19 (Monday, November 27, 2023)	Gwen Stefani	11	Kara Tenae	"Rain"	Advanced
Episode 20 (Tuesday, November 28, 2023)	John Legend	1	AZÁN	"Adorn"	Advanced
Episode 20 (Tuesday, November 28, 2023)	John Legend	2	Kristen Brown	"Need You Now"	Eliminated
Episode 20 (Tuesday, November 28, 2023)	John Legend	3	Kaylee Shimizu	"You Put a Move on My Heart"	Eliminated
Episode 20 (Tuesday, November 28, 2023)	John Legend	4	Taylor Deneen	"Get Here"	Eliminated
Episode 20 (Tuesday, November 28, 2023)	John Legend	5	Lila Forde	"Angel from Montgomery"	Advanced
Episode 20 (Tuesday, November 28, 2023)	John Legend	6	Mac Royals	"Untitled (How Does It Feel)"	Advanced

== Live shows ==
Live shows color key
Artist was saved by public's vote
Artist was placed in the bottom group and competed for an Instant Save
Artist was instantly saved
Artist was eliminated

=== Week 1: Top 12 – Quarterfinals (December 4–5) ===
The Top 12 performances comprised episodes 21 and 22. The Top 12 artists, three from each team, performed on Monday, with the results following on Tuesday. The top eight artists were saved by the public's vote, while the remaining four artists, who received the fewest votes, competed for the Instant Save in the results show. Last season's coach, Chance the Rapper served as the mentor for the Top 12 live shows.

With all three members of Team Reba advancing, Reba McEntire became the first new coach to take three artists from her team to the Semifinals.

Top 12 results
Episode	Coach	Order	Artist	Song	Result
Episode 21 (Monday, December 4, 2023)	Reba McEntire	1	Jacquie Roar	"Wildflowers and Wild Horses"	Public's vote
Episode 21 (Monday, December 4, 2023)	Niall Horan	2	Nini Iris	"Lovesong"	Public's vote
Episode 21 (Monday, December 4, 2023)	Gwen Stefani	3	Kara Tenae	"Love"	Bottom four
Episode 21 (Monday, December 4, 2023)	Gwen Stefani	4	Tanner Massey	"Thnks fr th Mmrs"	Bottom four
Episode 21 (Monday, December 4, 2023)	John Legend	5	Lila Forde	"Closer to Fine"	Public's vote
Episode 21 (Monday, December 4, 2023)	Reba McEntire	6	Ruby Leigh	"You Lie"	Public's vote
Episode 21 (Monday, December 4, 2023)	Niall Horan	7	Huntley	"With a Little Help from My Friends"	Public's vote
Episode 21 (Monday, December 4, 2023)	John Legend	8	AZÁN	"Ex-Factor"	Bottom four
Episode 21 (Monday, December 4, 2023)	Reba McEntire	9	Jordan Rainer	"Stranger in My House"	Bottom four
Episode 21 (Monday, December 4, 2023)	Niall Horan	10	Mara Justine	"Lose Control"	Public's vote
Episode 21 (Monday, December 4, 2023)	John Legend	11	Mac Royals	"I Can't Make You Love Me"	Public's vote
Episode 21 (Monday, December 4, 2023)	Gwen Stefani	12	BIAS	"God's Gonna Cut You Down"	Public's vote
Episode 22 (Tuesday, December 5, 2023)	Reba McEntire	1	Jordan Rainer	"Blame It on Your Heart"	Instantly saved
Episode 22 (Tuesday, December 5, 2023)	John Legend	2	AZÁN	"No Tears Left to Cry"	Eliminated
Episode 22 (Tuesday, December 5, 2023)	Gwen Stefani	3	Tanner Massey	"More Than Words"	Eliminated
Episode 22 (Tuesday, December 5, 2023)	Gwen Stefani	4	Kara Tenae	"Love Takes Time"	Eliminated

Non-competition performances
Order	Performers	Song
22.1	Gwen Stefani	"True Babe"
22.2	Reba McEntire	"Seven Minutes in Heaven"

=== Week 2: Top 9 – Semifinals (December 11–12) ===
The semifinals comprised episodes 23 and 24. The nine semifinalists each performed a solo song and a Taylor Swift trio with two fellow semifinalists on Monday, with the results following on Tuesday. The four artists with the most votes automatically moved on to the finale, while the remaining five artists competed in the Instant Save for the fifth and final spot in the finale.

With the elimination of Bias, Gwen Stefani no longer has any artists on her team. This is the fourth time out of her seven seasons as a coach where there are no artists representing her team in the finale. Meanwhile, with the advancements of Ruby Leigh and Jacquie Roar to the finale, Reba McEntire became the ninth new coach to successfully bring her team to the finale, the first being Usher (Michelle Chamuel in season four), the second being Alicia Keys (Wé McDonald in season 11), the third being Kelly Clarkson (Brynn Cartelli in season 14), the fourth being John Legend (Maelyn Jarmon in season 16), the fifth being Nick Jonas (Thunderstorm Artis in season 18), the sixth being Camila Cabello (Morgan Myles in season 22), the seventh Chance the Rapper (Sorelle in season 23), and the eighth Niall Horan (Gina Miles also in season 23). Also, McEntire became the first new coach to have two artists competing in the finale. She is also the second female coach to advance two artists in the finale, the first being Clarkson in season 21. This also marks the second time that multiple coaches have multiple artists competing in the finale, with McEntire and Horan both having two artists each, following the twenty-first season. Additionally, this marks the first time in The Voice history where every finalist was originally a four-chair turn in the Blind Auditions.

Semifinals results
Episode	Coach	Order	Artist	Solo song	Taylor Swift Trio	Result
Episode 23 (Monday December 11, 2023)	Reba McEntire	1 (9)	Ruby Leigh	"Take Me Home, Country Roads"	"Mean"	Public's vote
Episode 23 (Monday December 11, 2023)	Gwen Stefani	3 (9)	BIAS	"Bless the Broken Road"	"Mean"	Bottom five
Episode 23 (Monday December 11, 2023)	Reba McEntire	4 (6)	Jacquie Roar	"Alive"	"Don't Blame Me"	Bottom five
Episode 23 (Monday December 11, 2023)	Reba McEntire	5 (9)	Jordan Rainer	"Ol' Red"	"Mean"	Bottom five
Episode 23 (Monday December 11, 2023)	Niall Horan	7 (2)	Huntley	"Way Down We Go"	"Exile"	Public's vote
Episode 23 (Monday December 11, 2023)	Niall Horan	8 (6)	Mara Justine	"Parachute"	"Don't Blame Me"	Public's vote
Episode 23 (Monday December 11, 2023)	John Legend	10 (2)	Mac Royals	"Love T.K.O."	"Exile"	Bottom five
Episode 23 (Monday December 11, 2023)	Niall Horan	11 (6)	Nini Iris	"No Time to Die"	"Don't Blame Me"	Bottom five
Episode 23 (Monday December 11, 2023)	John Legend	12 (2)	Lila Forde	"River"	"Exile"	Public's vote
Episode 24 (Tuesday, December 12, 2023)	Niall Horan	1	Nini Iris	"Mad World"		Eliminated
Episode 24 (Tuesday, December 12, 2023)	Gwen Stefani	2	BIAS	"Go Rest High on That Mountain"		Eliminated
Episode 24 (Tuesday, December 12, 2023)	Reba McEntire	3	Jacquie Roar	"Alone"		Instantly saved
Episode 24 (Tuesday, December 12, 2023)	Reba McEntire	4	Jordan Rainer	"I Don't Dance"		Eliminated
Episode 24 (Tuesday, December 12, 2023)	John Legend	5	Mac Royals	"I Wanna Know"		Eliminated

Non-competition performances
Order	Performers	Song
24.1	Niall Horan and John Legend	"The Show"
24.2	John Legend	"What Christmas Means to Me"

=== Week 3: Finale (December 18–19) ===
The season finale ran through two nights, Monday and Tuesday, December 18 through 19, 2023, comprising episodes 25 and 26. The Top 5 performed on Monday, with each artist performing an up-tempo song and a ballad for the title of The Voice. At the episode's conclusion, the overnight voting for the season's winner began. The following night, on Tuesday, the finalists performed a duet with their respective coaches before the results of the public vote were announced, and the winner of the season was named.

Huntley was named as the winner on the season finale aired on December 19, 2023. His victory marks Niall Horan's second consecutive win as a coach, with Horan becoming the third coach to win multiple consecutive seasons, following Blake Shelton's winning streak from seasons 2 to 4, and Kelly Clarkson's consecutive wins in seasons 14 and 15. Horan also became the fourth coach to have won multiple times, the first three being Shelton (9 wins), Adam Levine (3 wins), and Clarkson (4 wins), and is also the second coach to win their first two seasons following Clarkson's wins in the fourteenth and fifteenth seasons.

Finale results
Coach	Artist	Episode 25 (Monday, December 18, 2023)				Episode 26 (Tuesday, December 19, 2023)		Result
Coach	Artist	Order	Up-tempo song	Order	Ballad	Order	Duet (with coach)	Result
Reba McEntire	Jacquie Roar	1	"More Than a Feeling"	6	"Nights in White Satin"	12	"No One Else on Earth"	Fourth place
John Legend	Lila Forde	2	"The Weight"	7	"Across the Universe"	14	"Sleigh Ride"	Fifth place
Niall Horan	Mara Justine	8	"Piece of My Heart"	3	"Turning Tables"	13	"Wasted Time"	Third place
Niall Horan	Huntley	10	"Higher"	4	"Another Love"	11	"Knockin' on Heaven's Door"	Winner
Reba McEntire	Ruby Leigh	5	"Suspicious Minds"	9	"Desperado"	15	"Rockin' Around the Christmas Tree"	Runner-up

Non-competition performances
Order	Performers	Song
25.1	Bryce Leatherwood	"The Finger"
26.1	Top 12 Artists and Rudi	"Dance the Night"
26.2	John Legend, Gwen Stefani, Niall Horan, and Reba McEntire	"Let It Snow! Let It Snow! Let It Snow!"
26.3	Dan + Shay	"Bigger Houses"
26.4	Keith Urban	"Blue Ain't Your Color"
26.5	Teddy Swims	"Lose Control"
26.6	AJR	"Yes I'm a Mess" / "Bang!"
26.7	Tyla	"Truth or Dare" / "Water"
26.8	Earth, Wind & Fire	"Boogie Wonderland" / "Let's Groove" / "September"

== Elimination chart ==
Results color key
Winner	Fifth place
Runner-up	Saved by the public
Third place	Saved by an instant save (via Voice App)
Fourth place	Eliminated

Coaches color key
Team Legend
Team Gwen
Team Niall
Team Reba

=== Overall ===
Live shows' results per week
Artists	Week 1 — Top 12	Week 2 — Top 9	Week 3 — Finale
Huntley	Safe	Safe	Winner
Ruby Leigh	Safe	Safe	Runner-up
Mara Justine	Safe	Safe	3rd place
Jacquie Roar	Safe	Safe	4th place
Lila Forde	Safe	Safe	5th place
BIAS	Safe	Eliminated	Eliminated (Week 2)
Jordan Rainer	Safe	Eliminated	Eliminated (Week 2)
Mac Royals	Safe	Eliminated	Eliminated (Week 2)
Nini Iris	Safe	Eliminated	Eliminated (Week 2)
AZÁN	Eliminated	Eliminated (Week 1)	
Kara Tenae	Eliminated	Eliminated (Week 1)	
Tanner Massey	Eliminated	Eliminated (Week 1)	

=== Per team ===
Live shows' results per team
Artists	Week 1 — Top 12	Week 2 — Top 9	Week 3 — Finale
Lila Forde	Advanced	Advanced	Fifth place
Mac Royals	Advanced	Eliminated	
AZÁN	Eliminated		
BIAS	Advanced	Eliminated	
Tanner Massey	Eliminated		
Kara Tenae	Eliminated		
Huntley	Advanced	Advanced	Winner
Mara Justine	Advanced	Advanced	Third place
Nini Iris	Advanced	Eliminated	
Ruby Leigh	Advanced	Advanced	Runner-up
Jacquie Roar	Advanced	Advanced	Fourth place
Jordan Rainer	Advanced	Eliminated	

== Ratings ==
Viewership and ratings per episode of The Voice season 24
No.	Title	Air date	Timeslot (ET)	Rating (18–49)	Viewers (millions)
1	"The Blind Auditions, Season Premiere"	September 25, 2023	Monday 8:00 p.m.	0.6	6.26
2	"The Blind Auditions, Part 2"	September 26, 2023	Tuesday 8:00 p.m.	0.6	6.54
3	"The Blind Auditions, Part 3"	October 2, 2023	Monday 8:00 p.m.	0.6	6.61
4	"The Blind Auditions, Part 4"	October 3, 2023	Tuesday 8:00 p.m.	0.7	6.57
5	"The Blind Auditions, Part 5"	October 9, 2023	Monday 8:00 p.m.	0.6	6.39
6	"The Blind Auditions, Part 6"	October 10, 2023	Tuesday 9:00 p.m.	0.6	5.98
7	"The Blind Auditions, Part 7"	October 16, 2023	Monday 8:00 p.m.	0.5	6.61
8	"The Battles Premiere"	October 17, 2023	Tuesday 9:00 p.m.	0.5	5.91
9	"The Battles Part 2"	October 23, 2023	Monday 8:00 p.m.	0.6	6.46
10	"The Battles Part 3"	October 24, 2023	Tuesday 9:00 p.m.	0.5	5.77
11	"The Battles Part 4"	October 30, 2023	Monday 8:00 p.m.	0.5	6.33
12	"The Battles Part 5"	October 31, 2023	Tuesday 9:00 p.m.	0.4	5.30
13	"The Battles Part 6/The Knockouts Premiere"	November 6, 2023	Monday 8:00 p.m.	0.5	6.58
14	"The Knockouts Part 2"	November 7, 2023	Tuesday 9:00 p.m.	0.5	5.82
15	"The Knockouts Part 3"	November 13, 2023	Monday 8:00 p.m.	0.5	6.45
16	"The Knockouts Part 4"	November 14, 2023	Tuesday 9:00 p.m.	0.5	5.55
17	"The Road to Playoffs"	November 20, 2023	Monday 8:00 p.m.	0.4	4.50
18	"The Playoffs Premiere"	November 21, 2023	Tuesday 9:00 p.m.	0.6	5.91
19	"The Playoffs Part 2"	November 27, 2023	Monday 8:00 p.m.	0.6	6.49
20	"The Playoffs Part 3"	November 28, 2023	Tuesday 9:00 p.m.	0.4	5.57
21	"Live Top 12 Performances"	December 4, 2023	Monday 8:00 p.m.	0.5	6.10
22	"Live Top 12 Results"	December 5, 2023	Tuesday 9:00 p.m.	0.4	5.65
23	"Live Semi-Final Performances"	December 11, 2023	Monday 8:00 p.m.	0.5	5.93
24	"Live Semi-Final Results"	December 12, 2023	Tuesday 9:00 p.m.	0.5	6.06
25	"Live Finale, Part 1"	December 18, 2023	Monday 8:00 p.m.	0.5	6.39
26	"Live Finale, Part 2"	December 19, 2023	Tuesday 9:00 p.m.	0.5	6.67
