= Happy to Be Here (EP) =

2024 EP by Bodie

EP by Bodie
- Released: September 27, 2024; March 7, 2025
- Genre: Christian contemporary; indie pop; pop; rap/hiphop
- Length: 19:16; 15:01
- Label: Provident
- Producer: Bodie; Sajan Nauriyal; Bede Korporaal; Austin Davis

Bodie chronology
Me and You (2019)	Happy to Be Here (2024)	Song Session (2025)

Alternative cover
- Happier to Be Here

Singles from Happy to Be Here
- 1. "RIP" Released: January 10, 2024; 2. "God Did" Released: July 12, 2024; 3. "Whisper and the Wind" Released: August 9, 2024

Singles from Happier to Be Here
- 1. "Whisper and the Wind" Released: August 9, 2024; 2. "Whisper and the Wind (Remix)" Released: February 7, 2025

Happy to Be Here is the label debut EP by American alternative pop and rap/hip-hop artist Bodie. It was released on Provident on September 27, 2024. Three of the extended play's tracks were released as singles, "RIP", "God Did", and "Whisper and the Wind". The EP was supported upon release with the Happy To Be Here With No One Else Tour, featuring Gio.

On March 7, 2025, Bodie released Happier To Be Here, which featured remixes of some of the original extended play's songs.

== Commercial performance ==
The song "Whisper and the Wind" reached No. 17 on the Billboard Hot Christian Songs chart, No. 19 on the Billboard Christian Airplay, and No. 22 on the Billboard Christian adult contemporary.

== Track listing ==
No.	Title	Writer(s)	Producer(s)	Length
1.	"RIP"	Bodie Kuljian; Nick Bays; Sajan Nauriyal	Sajan Nauriyal	2:49
2.	"God Did"	Austin David; Bodie Kuljian; Mitch Wong	Austin Davis	2:20
3.	"Whisper and the Wind"	Bodie Kuljian; Sajan Nauriyal; Wes Strunk	Sajan Nauriyal	3:17
4.	"Liar Liar"	Bodie Kuljian; Sajan Nauriyal; Wes Strunk	Bodie Kulijian; Sajan Nauriyal	2:45
5.	"Know"	Aaaron Ferrer; Bodie Kuljian	Bodie Kulijian	3:05
6.	"Smile"	Bede Benjamin-Korporaal; Bodie Kuljian; Emmi Elliot	Bodie Kulijian; Bede Korporaal	4:56
Total length:				19:16

Happier to Be Here
No.	Title	Writer(s)	Producer(s)	Length
1.	"Whisper and the Wind" (remix, with Grace Binion)	Bodie Kulijian; Sajan Nauriyal; Wes Strunk	Bodie Kulijian; Sajan Nauriyal	3:02
2.	"RIP" (remix)			2:14
3.	"RIP" (acoustic)			2:23
4.	"Whisper and the Wind" (acoustic)			4:05
5.	"Whisper and the Wind"	Bodie Kulijian; Sajan Nauriyal; Wes Strunk	Sajan Nauriyal	3:17
Total length:				15:01
