= Huntley (singer) =

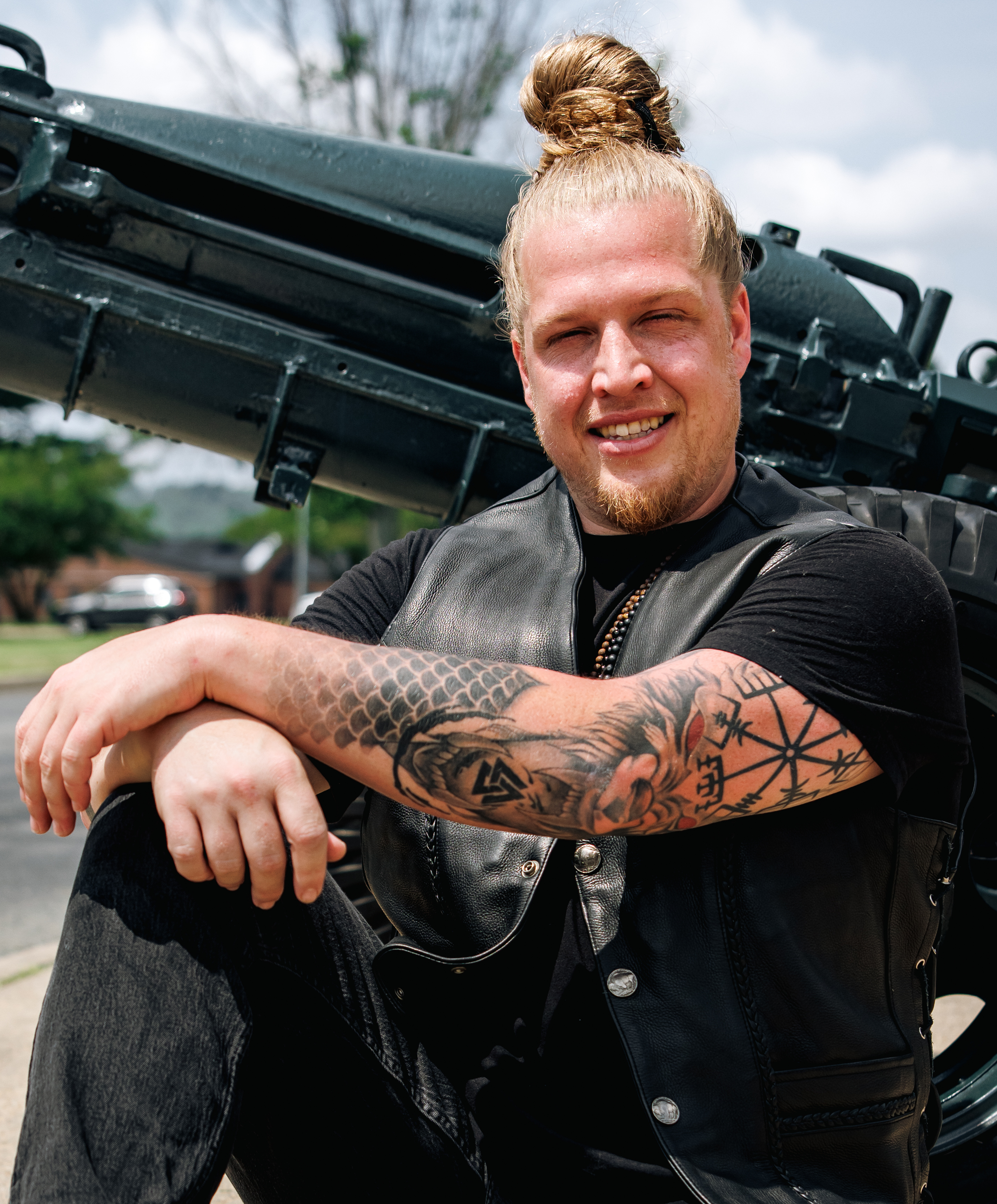
- Huntley in 2025

Background information
- Born: May 26, 1990 (age 36); Spring Hill, Florida, U.S.
- Genres: Blues rock; Soul
- Occupation: Singer
- Instrument: Vocals
- Years active: 2022–present
- Label: Republic

Michael Huntley (born May 26, 1990), aka Huntley, is an American blues rock singer-songwriter. He is the winner of season 24 of the American talent competition The Voice, He competed on the team coached by Niall Horan, giving Horan his second consecutive win as a coach on the show.

== Life and career ==
Huntley is originally from Spring Hill, Florida and he moved to Fredericksburg, Virginia. Huntley briefly moved to Nashville to pursue a career in music but went back to Fredericksburg prior to auditioning for The Voice. He has three children: a daughter, Stella; a son, Michael Jr.; and a daughter, Willow.

Before winning The Voice, he auditioned for the 14th season of American Idol, making it to the Hollywood rounds. He was never shown performing on the broadcast.

=== 2022–present: "Holdin' On", The Voice ===
In 2022, Huntley independently released his debut single, "Holdin' On".

Performances on The Voice season 24
Round	Theme	Song	Original artist	Order	Original air date	Result
Blind Auditions	—N/a	"She Talks to Angels"	Black Crowes	7.1	Oct. 16, 2023	John Legend, Gwen Stefani, Niall Horan, and Reba McEntire turned their chairs; joined Team Niall.
Battles (Top 56)	—N/a	"Hold My Hand" (vs. Brailey Lenderman)	Hootie & the Blowfish	13.1	Nov. 6, 2023	Saved by Niall
Knockouts (Top 36)	—N/a	"Wanted Dead or Alive" (vs. Claudia B. & Noah Spencer)	Bon Jovi	15.3	Nov. 13, 2023	Saved by Niall
Playoffs (Top 24)	—N/a	"Daylight"	David Kushner	18.3	Nov. 21, 2023	Saved by Niall
Live Quarterfinals (Top 12)	—N/a	"With a Little Help from My Friends"	The Beatles	21.7	Dec. 4, 2023	Saved by public vote
Live Semi-finals (Top 9)	—N/a	"Way Down We Go"	Kaleo	23.7	Dec. 11, 2023	Saved by public vote
Live Finale (Final 5)	"Ballad"	"Another Love"	Tom Odell	25.4	Dec. 18, 2023	Winner
Live Finale (Final 5)	"Uptempo Song"	"Higher"	Creed	25.10	Dec. 18, 2023	Winner
Live Finale (Final 5)	"Duet with coach"	"Knockin' on Heaven's Door" (Duet with Niall Horan)	Bob Dylan	26.11	Dec. 19, 2023	Winner

In 2023, Huntley competed in the 24th season of The Voice. During the blind auditions, he sang "She Talks to Angels" by The Black Crowes. Season's four coaches, John Legend, Gwen Stefani, Niall Horan, and Reba McEntire turned their chairs for him. Before choosing his coach, Huntley brought his daughter, Stella, on stage and it was revealed that she would pick his coach. She chose Team Niall, making Huntley a part of Horan's team.

Huntley won the competition on December 19, 2023. As a result, Niall Horan had his second consecutive win, after his contestant in season 23, Gina Miles, was named the winner of the season in May 2023. Huntley won $100,000 and a record deal with Republic Records, a label owned by Universal Music Group, which was later revoked by Republic Records when they released him from the contract in May 2024. On December 23, 2023, he performed the national anthem at a Buffalo Bills vs. Los Angeles Chargers game.

In early August 2024, Huntley announced his new single, "Tell Me When It's Over", which was released on August 21, 2024. On October 29, 2024, "Skyline Drive" came out, his second single since winning The Voice. He performed the song on the season 26 finale of the show on December 10.

== Artistry ==
In an interview with The Free Lance–Star in 2022, Huntley described his genre as being "singer-songwriter country (music), definitely Southern blues rock 'n' roll." While performing on The Voice, Huntley was often compared to Chris Stapleton, among other singers.

== Discography ==
=== Singles ===
List of singles, showing year released, selected chart positions, and the name of the album
Title	Year	Peak chart positions	Album
Title	Year	US	Album
"Holdin' On"	2022	—	—
"Tell Me When It's Over"	2024	—	—
"Skyline Drive"	2024	—	—
"Fire and Flames"	2025	—	—
"—" denotes a recording that did not chart or was not released in that territory

Awards and achievements
Preceded by Gina Miles	The Voice (American); Winner; 2023 (Fall)	Succeeded by Asher HaVon
Preceded by "Style"	The Voice (American); Winner's song "Higher"; 2023 (Fall)	Succeeded by "Last Dance"
