= The Voice (American TV series) season 22 =

The Voice
- Season 22
- Promotional poster featuring coaches Shelton, Stefani, Cabello, and Legend
- Hosted by: Carson Daly
- Coaches: John Legend; Gwen Stefani; Camila Cabello; Blake Shelton
- No. of contestants: 56 artists
- Winner: Bryce Leatherwood
- Winning coach: Blake Shelton
- Runner-up: Bodie
- No. of episodes: 26

Release
- Original network: NBC
- Original release: September 19 – December 13, 2022

Season chronology
- ← Previous; Season 21 Next → Season 23

The twenty-second season of the American reality television series The Voice premiered September 19, 2022, on NBC. Blake Shelton and John Legend returned as coaches for their twenty-second and seventh seasons, respectively. Gwen Stefani, who last coached on season 19, returned as a coach for her sixth season. Camila Cabello made her first appearance as a coach this season. Meanwhile, Carson Daly returned as host for his twenty-second season.

Bryce Leatherwood was named the winner of the season, marking Blake Shelton's record-extending ninth and final win as a coach. His victory is the first instance in which a contestant who had been saved by a Wild Card instant save would go on to win the entire competition.

In a similar manner to the eighteen season, Daly forwent the announcement of third place and instead announced Leatherwood as the winner, without revealing the final placements for Bodie or Morgan Myles. However, in a press statement released by NBC, Bodie was revealed to be runner-up and Myles was revealed to be third place.

This season is also the first season without studio performances released on any platform.

== Panelists ==
=== Coaches and host ===
Coaches and Host of The Voice Season 22

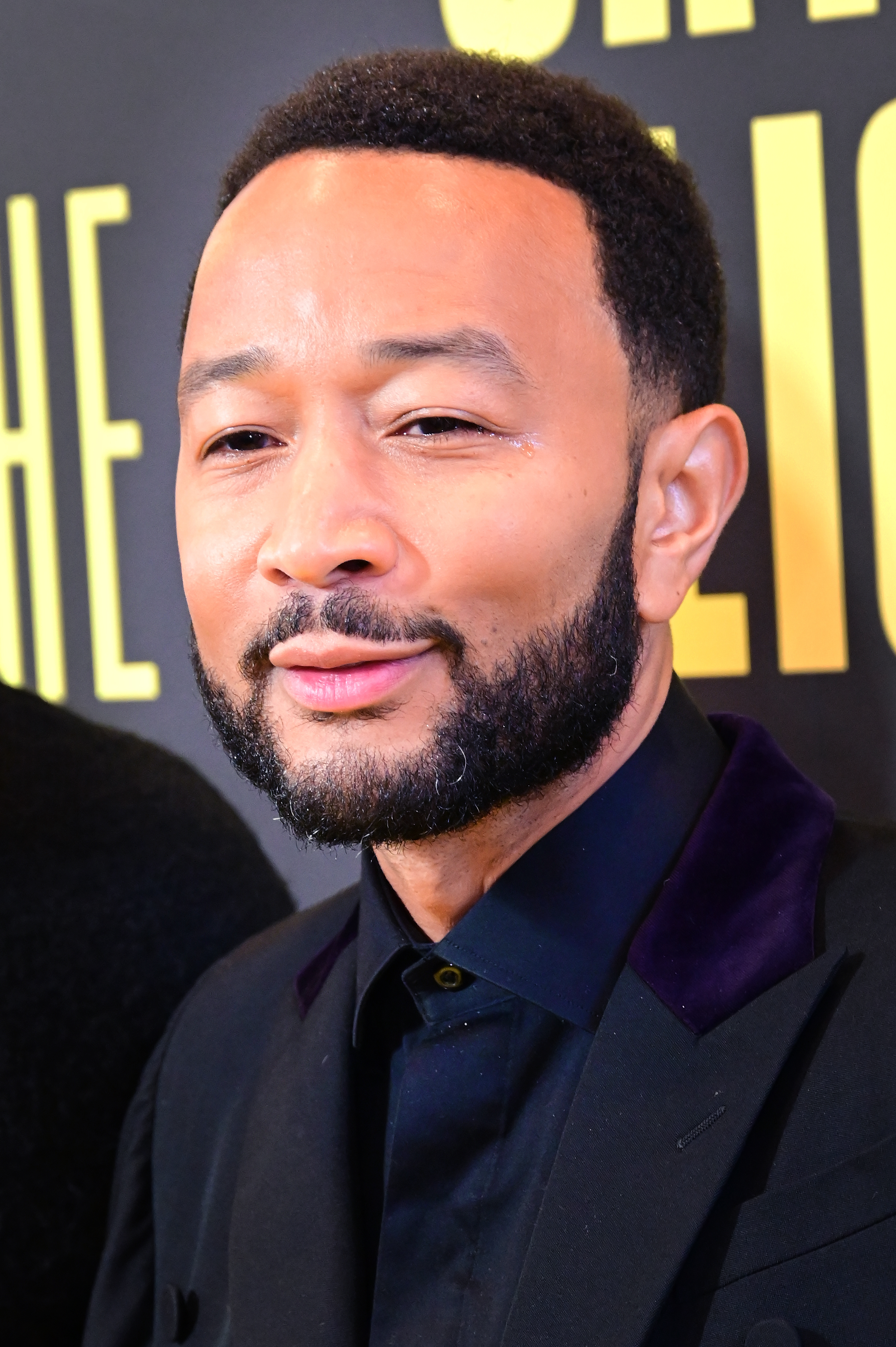
John Legend

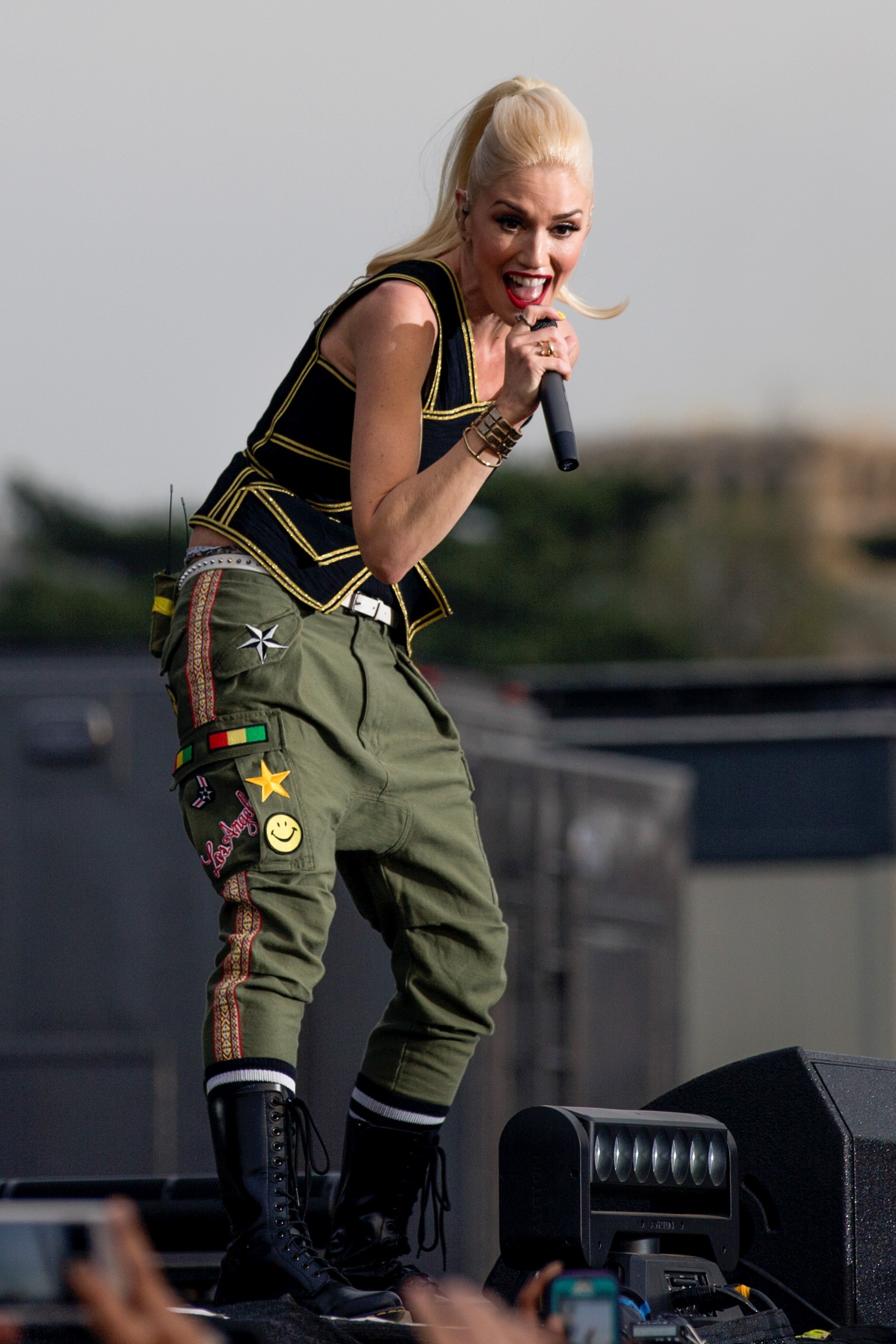
Gwen Stefani

Camila Cabello

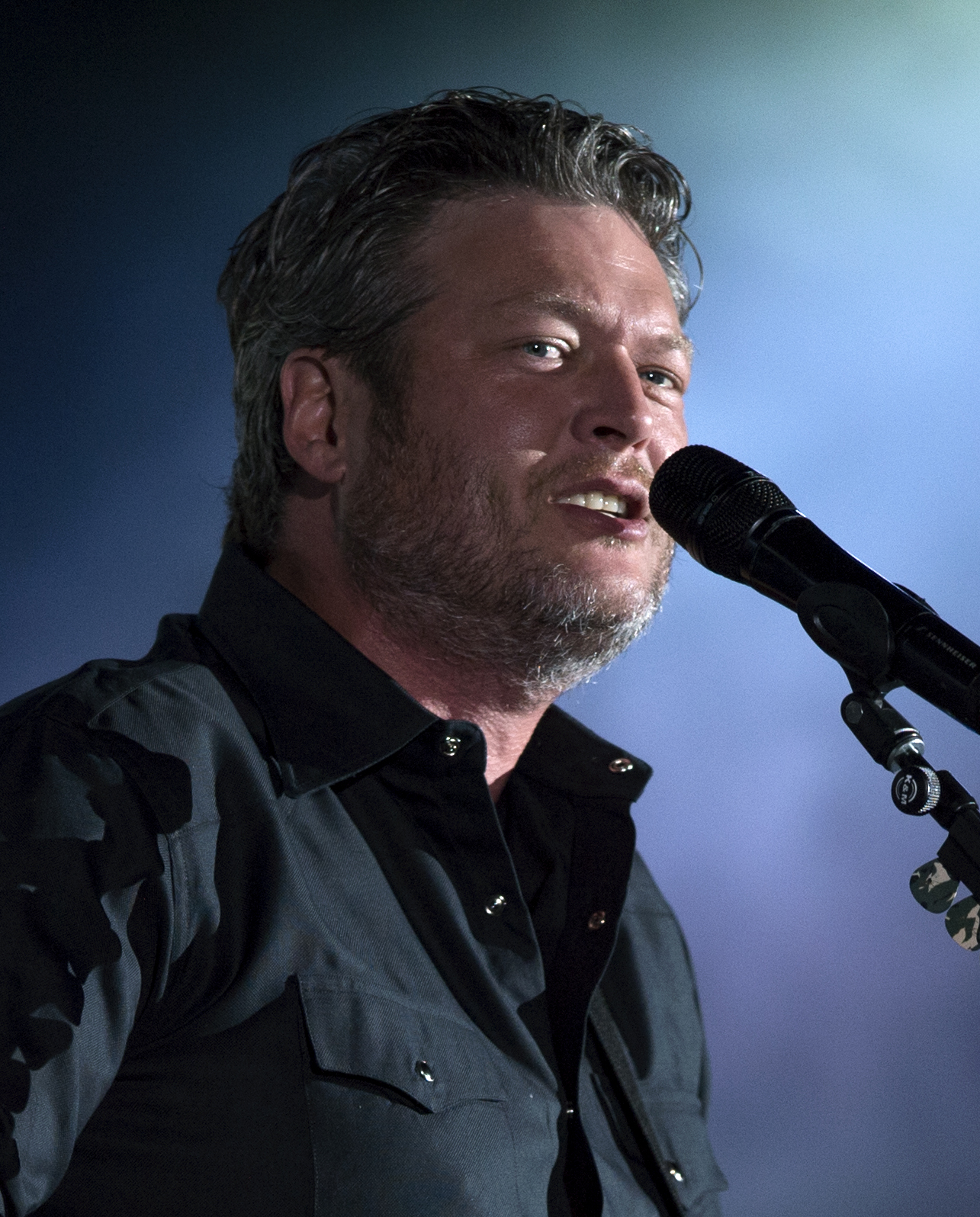
Blake Shelton

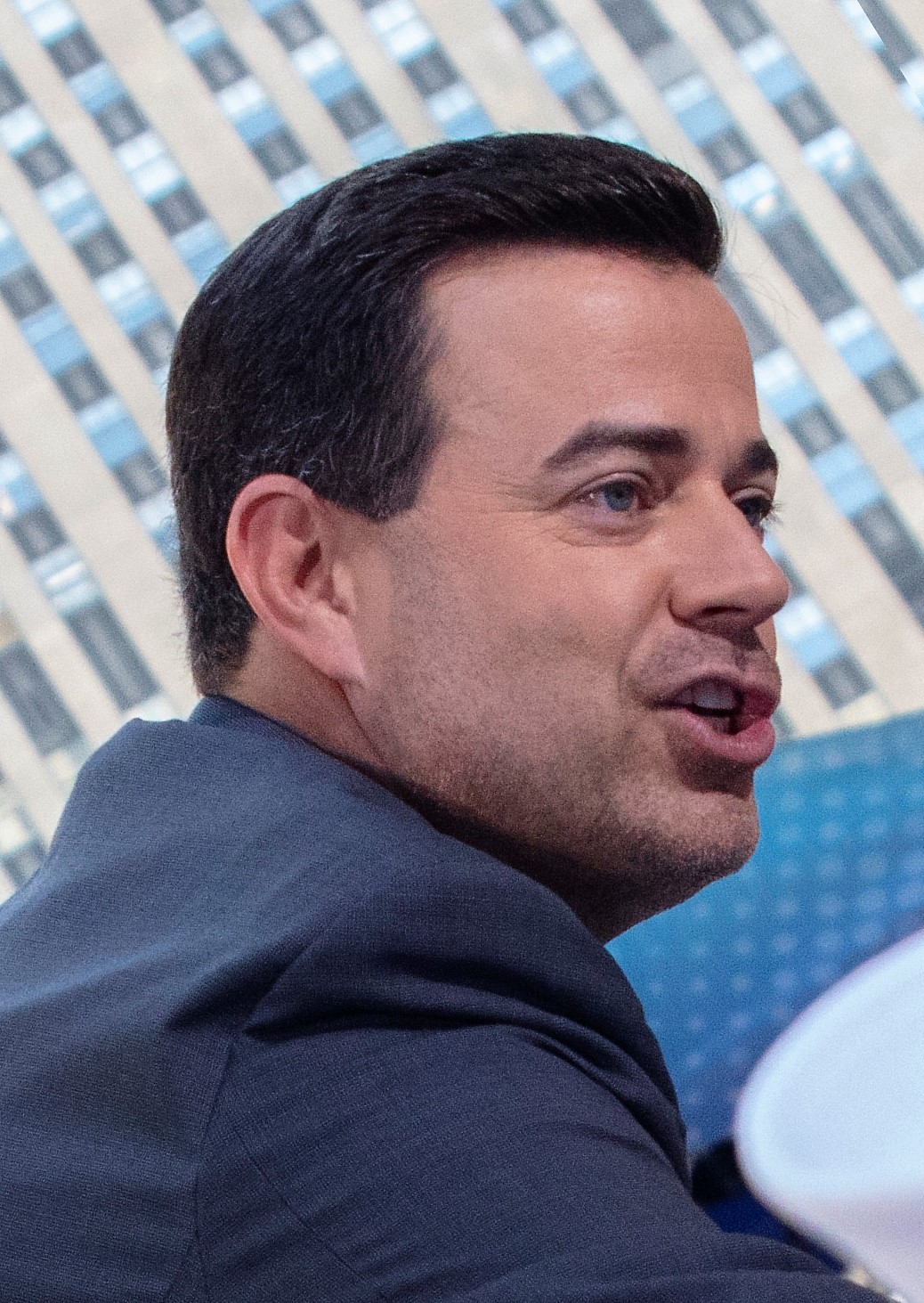
Carson Daly

In May 2022, NBC announced that there would be a change in the show's roster of coaches. Of the four coaches that appeared on the previous season, only Blake Shelton and John Legend continue, with Shelton returning for his twenty-second season and Legend returning for his seventh. Kelly Clarkson and Ariana Grande both exited the panel, with Gwen Stefani returning for her sixth season and Camila Cabello returning for her second time on the show and joining as a first-time coach. Cabello previously served as the battle advisor for Team Legend in the previous season. Carson Daly returned for his twenty-second season as host.

=== Battle advisors ===
The teams' battle advisors were revealed on August 17, 2022. The battle advisors for this season are Jazmine Sullivan for Team Legend, Sean Paul for Team Gwen, Charlie Puth for Team Camila, and Jimmie Allen for Team Blake.

=== Promotion ===
The show, via its online platforms, released the coaches' cover of Camila Cabello's "Havana" on Wednesday, September 14, 2022.

Shortly prior to the season premiere (on Friday, September 16, 2022), the blind audition of Morgan Myles singing Leonard Cohen's Hallelujah was released online. Later episodes saw the auditions of Alyssa Witrado, Andrew Igbokidi, Parajita Bastola, Bodie Kuljian, Grace Bello, and Constance Howard being released as respective "sneak peeks" for the episodes that they auditioned in.

== Teams ==
Teams color key
Winner	Eliminated in the Live shows
Runner-up	Eliminated in the Live playoffs
Third place	Stolen in the Knockouts
Fourth place	Eliminated in the Knockouts
Fifth place	Stolen in the Battles
	Eliminated in the Battles

Coaches' teams
Coach	Top 56 Artists			
John Legend				
John Legend	Omar Jose Cardona	Parijita Bastola	Kim Cruse	Sasha Hurtado
John Legend	Peyton Aldridge	Emma Brooke	Valarie Harding	Ian Harrison
John Legend	The Marilynds	Morgan Taylor	David Andrew	Lana Love
John Legend	Dia Malai	Kara McKee	SOLsong	Nia Skyfer
Gwen Stefani				
Gwen Stefani	Justin Aaron	Kique	Alyssa Witrado	Kevin Hawkins
Gwen Stefani	~~Rowan Grace~~	~~Sasha Hurtado~~	Cara Brindisi	Daysia
Gwen Stefani	Destiny Leigh	Kayla Von Der Heide	~~Jay Allen~~	~~Ian Harrison~~
Gwen Stefani	Julia Aslanli	Sadie Bass	Tanner Howe	Jillian Jordyn
Camila Cabello				
Camila Cabello	Morgan Myles	Devix	Eric Who	Kate Kalvach
Camila Cabello	Steven McMorran	Chello	Andrew Igbokidi	Reina Ley
Camila Cabello	Jaeden Luke	Orlando Mendez	~~Sasha Hurtado~~	Grace Bello
Camila Cabello	Constance Howard	Sydney Kronmiller	Zach Newbould	Ava Lynn Thuresson
Blake Shelton				
Blake Shelton	Bryce Leatherwood	Bodie	Brayden Lape	Rowan Grace
Blake Shelton	~~Kevin Hawkins~~	~~Kate Kalvach~~	Jay Allen	The Dryes
Blake Shelton	Austin Montgomery	Eva Ullmann	~~Jaeden Luke~~	Ansley Burns
Blake Shelton	Tanner Fussell	Madison Hughes	Hillary Torchiana	Benny Weag
Note: Italicized names are stolen artists (names struck through within former teams). Underlined names are artists saved by their coach.

== Blind auditions ==
The show began with the Blind Auditions on September 19, 2022. In each audition, an artist sings their piece in front of the coaches whose chairs are facing the audience. If a coach is interested to work with the artist, they will press their button to face the artist. If a singular coach presses the button, the artist automatically becomes part of their team. If multiple coaches turn, they will compete for the artist, who will decide which team they will join. Each coach has one "block" to prevent another coach from getting an artist. This season, each coach ends up with 14 artists by the end of the blind auditions, creating a total of 56 artists advancing to the battles.

Blind auditions color key
✔	Coach hit his/her "I WANT YOU" button
	Artist defaulted to this coach's team
	Artist selected to join this coach's team
	Artist was eliminated with no coach pressing their button
✘	Coach pressed "I WANT YOU" button, but was blocked by another coach from getting the artist
	Blocked by John; Blocked by Gwen; Blocked by Camila; Blocked by Blake

=== Episode 1 (September 19) ===
First blind auditions results
Order	Artist	Age	Hometown	Song	Coach's and artist's choices			
Order	Artist	Age	Hometown	Song	John	Gwen	Camila	Blake
1	Morgan Myles	35	Williamsport, Pennsylvania	"Hallelujah"	✔	✘	✔	✔
2	Omar Jose Cardona	33	Orlando, Florida	"Separate Ways (Worlds Apart)"	✔	✔	✔	✔
3	Ian Harrison	20	Lewis Center, Ohio	"The Night We Met"	✔	✔	–	✔
4	Tiana Goss	28	Los Angeles, California	"Say It Right"	–	–	–	–
5	Emma Brooke	19	Lyman, South Carolina	"California Dreamin'"	✔	✔	–	–
6	Orlando Mendez	26	Miami, Florida	"Beer Never Broke My Heart"	✔	✔	✔	✔
7	Alexis McLaughlin	25	Conroe, Texas	"Here I Go Again"	–	–	–	–
8	David Andrew	25	Detroit, Michigan	"Falling"	✔	✔	–	–
9	Jay Allen	36	Cedar Falls, Iowa	"'Til You Can't"	–	✔	–	✔
10	JJ Hill	34	Pilot Rock, Oregon	"Inside Out"	–	–	–	–
11	Kate Kalvach	27	Pittsburgh, Pennsylvania	"Rainbow"	–	✔	✔	✔

=== Episode 2 (September 20) ===
Among this episode's auditionees was Peyton Aldridge, who previously competed on the eighteenth season of American Idol.

Second blind auditions results
Order	Artist	Age	Hometown	Song	Coach's and artist's choices			
Order	Artist	Age	Hometown	Song	John	Gwen	Camila	Blake
1	Reina Ley	13	San Tan Valley, Arizona	"Cielito Lindo"	–	✔	✔	–
2	Bryce Leatherwood	22	Woodstock, Georgia	"Goodbye Time"	✔	✔	–	✔
3	KoKo	31	Mobile, Alabama	"About Damn Time"	–	–	–	–
4	Alyssa Witrado	19	Fresno, California	"Don't Speak"	–	✔	✔	–
5	Devix (Eric Torres)	28	Queens, New York	"Heat Waves"	✔	✔	✔	–
6	Chello (Marticello Greco)	22	Chester, Pennsylvania	"Just the Two of Us"	✔	–	✔	–
7	Kevin Hawkins	28	Lancaster, Texas	"Isn't She Lovely"	✘	✔	✔	✔
8	Sadie Bass	25	Bath, Michigan	"Stupid Boy"	–	✔	–	✔
9	SHEj	26	Atlanta, Georgia	"I Like It"	–	–	–	–
10	Brayden Lape	15	Grass Lake, Michigan	"This Town"	–	–	–	✔
11	Peyton Aldridge	25	Cleveland, Mississippi	"Can't You See"	✔	✔	–	✘

=== Episode 3 (September 26) ===
Third blind auditions results
Order	Artist	Age	Hometown	Song	Coach's and artist's choices			
Order	Artist	Age	Hometown	Song	John	Gwen	Camila	Blake
1	Andrew Igbokidi	22	Chicago, Illinois	"when the party's over"	✔	✔	✔	✔
2	Cara Brindisi	34	Shrewsbury, Massachusetts	"All Too Well"	–	✔	–	✔
3	Billy Craver	29	Palm Beach Gardens, Florida	"She Got the Best of Me"	–	–	–	–
4	Valarie Harding	41	Muskogee, Oklahoma	"Giving Him Something He Can Feel"	✔	✔	–	–
5	Julia Aslanli	23	DeLand, Florida	"Let's Stay Together"	–	✔	–	–
6	The Dryes (Katelyn and Derek Dryes)	36 & 33	Winston-Salem, North Carolina	"Islands in the Stream"	–	✔	–	✔
7	Ava Lynn Thuresson	18	San Diego, California	"…Baby One More Time"	✔	–	✔	–
8	Madison Hughes	25	Ponte Vedra Beach, Florida	"Knockin' on Heaven's Door"	–	✔	✔	✔
9	Sasha Hurtado	18	Dallas, Georgia	"River"	✔	–	✔	–
10	Dominic Patrick	37	Philadelphia, Pennsylvania	"U Got It Bad"	–	–	–	–
11	Morgan Taylor	20	Carmel, Indiana	"Cuz I Love You"	✔	✔	✔	✔

=== Episode 4 (September 27) ===
Fourth blind auditions results
Order	Artist	Age	Hometown	Song	Coach's and artist's choices			
Order	Artist	Age	Hometown	Song	John	Gwen	Camila	Blake
1	Tanner Howe	29	Huntington Beach, California	"Mercy"	✔	✔	–	✔
2	Sydney Kronmiller	25	Ogden, Utah	"Latch"	–	✔	✔	–
3	Tanner Fussell	28	Statesboro, Georgia	"Anymore"	–	–	–	✔
4	Eva Ullmann	21	Ponte Vedra Beach, Florida	"Light On"	–	–	–	✔
5	Emani Prince	22	Fort Gaines, Georgia	"All My Life"	–	–	–	–
6	Kayla Von Der Heide	30	Hesperia, California	"Jealous Guy"	✔	✔	–	–
7	Destiny Leigh	18	Sofia, Bulgaria	"A Song for You"	–	✔	–	–
8	Eric Who (Eric Tyler)	22	Charleston, South Carolina	"bad guy"	–	–	✔	–
9	Parijita Bastola	17	Baltimore, Maryland	"Jealous"	✔	✔	✔	✔

=== Episode 5 (October 3) ===
Among this episode's auditionees was Ansley Burns, who previously competed on the fourteenth season of America's Got Talent.

Fifth blind auditions results
Order	Artist	Age	Hometown	Song	Coach's and artist's choices			
Order	Artist	Age	Hometown	Song	John	Gwen	Camila	Blake
1	Kique (Kique Gomez)	18	Miami, Florida	"Beautiful Girls"	–	✔	–	✔
2	Hillary Torchiana	34	State College, Pennsylvania	"Easy on Me"	–	–	–	✔
3	MANU (Manuela Maria)	18	Howell, New Jersey	"Shallow"	–	–	–	–
4	The Marilynds (Kasey and Lindsay Staniszewski)	30 & 34	La Plata, Maryland	"What If I Never Get Over You"	✔	–	✔	–
5	SOLsong	28	Saginaw, Michigan	"Turning Tables"	✔	–	–	–
6	Kara McKee	36	Cumberland, Rhode Island	"Woodstock"	✔	–	–	–
7	Zach Newbould	19	Northborough, Massachusetts	"Use Somebody"	–	✔	✔	–
8	Lana Love	30	Naples, Florida	"Candy"	✔	–	–	–
9	Daysia (Daysia Reneau)	17	Hampton, Virginia	"Crazy"	–	✔	–	✔
10	Conner Sweeny	23	Nashville, Tennessee	"Ain't Worth the Whiskey"	–	–	–	–
11	Ansley Burns	15	Easley, South Carolina	"Unchained Melody"	–	✘	–	✔
12	Manasseh Samone	22	Dallas, Texas	"Rescue"	–	–	–	–
13	Bodie	29	Los Angeles, California	"You Found Me"	✔	✔	✔	✔

=== Episode 6 (October 4) ===
Sixth blind auditions results
Order	Artist	Age	Hometown	Song	Coach's and artist's choices			
Order	Artist	Age	Hometown	Song	John	Gwen	Camila	Blake
1	Austin Montgomery	19	Hemet, California	"I Can't Help It (If I'm Still in Love with You)"	–	✔	✔	✔
2	Dia Malai	26	Queens, New York	"Real Love"	✔	–	–	–
3	The Little Miss (Haley Johnson)	31	San Diego, California	"You Were Meant for Me"	–	–	–	–
4	Benny Weag	29	Lake County, Montana	"Shivers"	–	–	–	✔
5	Jillian Jordyn	17	Melville, New York	"Issues"	✔	✔	–	–
6	Hanny Ramadan	23	Voorhees, New Jersey	"Round Here"	–	–	–	–
7	Grace Bello	21	Cibolo, Texas	"Ghost"	✔	✔	✔	✔

=== Episode 7 (October 10) ===
The seventh episode included the last auditions as well as the first battle. The coaches performed Camila Cabello's "Havana" once all the teams were full.

Seventh blind auditions results
Order	Artist	Age	Hometown	Song	Coach's and artist's choices			
Order	Artist	Age	Hometown	Song	John	Gwen	Camila	Blake
1	Kim Cruse	30	Woodville, Texas	"Best Part"	✔	✔	✔	✔
2	Steven McMorran	40	Little Rock, Arkansas	"Never Enough"	–	–	✔	–
3	Rowan Grace	16	Rapid City, South Dakota	"traitor"	✔	✔	✔	–
4	Yelka (Yelka Gonzalez-Vargas)	20	San Diego, California	"No Me Queda Mas"	–	–	–	–
5	Constance Howard	27	Katy, Texas	"Peaches"	✔	–	✔	–
6	Justin Aaron	34	Junction City, Kansas	"Glory"	–	✔	Team full	–
7	August James	21	Chatsworth, California	"Heart of Glass"	–	Team full	Team full	–
8	Jaeden Luke ^{1}	22	Bothell, Washington	"Make It with You"	✔	Team full	Team full	✔
9	Nia Skyfer (Stephanie Concepcion)	26	Havana, Cuba	"Bam Bam"	✔	Team full	Team full	Team full

- ^1 Camila attempted to push her button for Luke, but was not possible, since her team was already full.

== Battles ==
The battles aired on Monday, October 10, 2022, through Tuesday, October 25, 2022, comprising episodes 7 through 12. In this round, the coaches pit two of their artists in a singing match and then select one of them to advance to the next round.

Losing artists may be "stolen" by another coach, becoming new members of their team; or can be saved by their coach, remaining a part of their original team. Multiple coaches can attempt to steal an artist, resulting in a competition for the artist, who will ultimately decide which team they will join. Additionally, their original coach can compete for their artist if they attempt to save them. At the end of this round, nine artists will remain on each team; seven will be the battle winners, and one from a steal and a save, respectively. In total, 36 artists advanced to the knockouts.

The guest advisors for this round were Jazmine Sullivan for Team Legend, Sean Paul for Team Gwen, Charlie Puth for Team Camila, and Jimmie Allen for Team Blake.

Battles color key
Artist won the battle and advanced to the knockouts
Artist lost the battle, but was stolen by another coach, and, advanced to the knockouts
Artist lost the battle, but was saved by their coach, and, advanced to knockouts
Artist lost the battle and was eliminated

Battles results
Episode	Coach	Order	Winner	Song	Loser	'Steal'/'Save' result			
Episode	Coach	Order	Winner	Song	Loser	John	Gwen	Camila	Blake
Episode 7 (Monday, October 10, 2022)	Blake	1	Austin Montgomery	"Folsom Prison Blues"	Tanner Fussell	–	–	–	–
Episode 8 (Tuesday, October 11, 2022)	Gwen	1	Rowan Grace	"Fingers Crossed"	Jillian Jordyn	–	–	–	–
Episode 8 (Tuesday, October 11, 2022)	John	2	Valarie Harding	"Bust Your Windows"	Dia Malai	–	–	–	–
Episode 8 (Tuesday, October 11, 2022)	Camila	3	Morgan Myles	"Wrecking Ball"	Steven McMorran	–	–	✔	–
Episode 9 (Monday, October 17, 2022)	Camila	1	Orlando Mendez	"Rocket Man"	Ava Lynn Thuresson	–	–	N/A	–
Episode 9 (Monday, October 17, 2022)	Gwen	2	Cara Brindisi	"Leather and Lace"	Jay Allen	–	✔	–	✔
Episode 9 (Monday, October 17, 2022)	John	3	Emma Brooke	"She's All I Wanna Be"	Nia Skyfer	–	–	–	N/A
Episode 9 (Monday, October 17, 2022)	Blake	4	Bodie	"As Long as You Love Me"	Jaeden Luke	–	✔	✔	–
Episode 9 (Monday, October 17, 2022)	Camila	5	Reina Ley	"Time After Time"	Grace Bello	–	–	Team full	N/A
Episode 9 (Monday, October 17, 2022)	Gwen	6	Justin Aaron	"No More Drama"	Destiny Leigh	–	✔	Team full	N/A
Episode 10 (Tuesday, October 18, 2022)	Camila	1	Eric Who	"Paparazzi"	Sydney Kronmiller	–	–	Team full	N/A
Episode 10 (Tuesday, October 18, 2022)	Blake	2	Brayden Lape	"Pretty Heart"	Benny Weag	–	–	Team full	–
Episode 10 (Tuesday, October 18, 2022)	Blake	3	Eva Ullmann	"Wildest Dreams"	Ansley Burns	–	–	Team full	–
Episode 10 (Tuesday, October 18, 2022)	John	4	Morgan Taylor	"Die for You"	SOLsong	–	–	Team full	N/A
Episode 10 (Tuesday, October 18, 2022)	Gwen	5	Daysia	"Home"	Julia Aslanli	–	N/A	Team full	N/A
Episode 10 (Tuesday, October 18, 2022)	John	6	Parijita Bastola	"How Deep Is Your Love"	The Marilynds	✔	–	Team full	N/A
Episode 11 (Monday, October 24, 2022)	Gwen	1	Kique	"Don't You (Forget About Me)"	Tanner Howe	–	N/A	Team full	N/A
Episode 11 (Monday, October 24, 2022)	Blake	2	Kevin Hawkins	"Preach"	Hillary Torchiana	–	–	Team full	–
Episode 11 (Monday, October 24, 2022)	Camila	3	Devix	"Electric Feel"	Sasha Hurtado	–	✔	Team full	N/A
Episode 11 (Monday, October 24, 2022)	John	4	Kim Cruse	"Heartbreak Anniversary"	David Andrew	N/A	Team full	Team full	N/A
Episode 11 (Monday, October 24, 2022)	Blake	5	Kate Kalvach	"Every Rose Has Its Thorn"	Madison Hughes	–	Team full	Team full	–
Episode 11 (Monday, October 24, 2022)	Gwen	6	Alyssa Witrado	"happier than ever"	Ian Harrison	✔	Team full	Team full	N/A
Episode 12 (Tuesday, October 25, 2022)	John	1	Omar Jose Cardona	"Into the Unknown"	Lana Love	Team full	Team full	Team full	N/A
Episode 12 (Tuesday, October 25, 2022)	Camila	2	Andrew Igbokidi	"I Wanna Dance with Somebody (Who Loves Me)"	Zach Newbould	Team full	Team full	Team full	N/A
Episode 12 (Tuesday, October 25, 2022)	Camila	3	Chello	"Leave the Door Open"	Constance Howard	Team full	Team full	Team full	N/A
Episode 12 (Tuesday, October 25, 2022)	John	4	Peyton Aldridge	"More Than Words"	Kara McKee	Team full	Team full	Team full	N/A
Episode 12 (Tuesday, October 25, 2022)	Gwen	5	Kayla Von Der Heide	"Everything I Own"	Sadie Bass	Team full	Team full	Team full	N/A
Episode 12 (Tuesday, October 25, 2022)	Blake	6	Bryce Leatherwood	"Red Dirt Road"	The Dryes	Team full	Team full	Team full	✔

== Knockouts ==
The knockouts aired on October 31, 2022 through November 7, 2022, comprising episodes 13 to 15. In this round, each coach groups three of their artists in a singing match. The artists themselves will select the song they will sing in the round. The coach will then select one of the three artists to advance to the Live Playoffs. Each coach can steal one losing artist from another team, but the coaches do not have the ability to save their artists. At the end of this round, three artists will remain on each team while four artists will be stolen, creating a total of sixteen artists advancing to the Live Playoffs.

This was the first season since season 12 to not feature a mega mentor for the Knockouts. It is also the first season in the show's history to pit three artists against each other in a standard Knockout, though were a couple individual instances of three-way knockouts in previous seasons, such as in Team Pharrell in the 8th season and in Team Kelly in the 15th season, both being the result of an artist's withdrawal mid-season.

Knockouts color key
Artist won the knockout and advanced to the live playoffs
Artist lost the knockout but, was stolen by another coach, and advanced to the live playoffs
Artist lost the knockout and was eliminated

Knockouts results
Episode	Coach	Order	Winner		Losers		'Steal' result			
Episode	Coach	Order	Song	Artist	Artist	Song	John	Gwen	Camila	Blake
Episode 13 (Monday, October 31, 2022) (Halloween)	Blake	1	"Better Now"	Bodie	The Dryes	"Chasing After You"	–	–	–	N/A
Episode 13 (Monday, October 31, 2022) (Halloween)	Blake	1	"Better Now"	Bodie	Kevin Hawkins	"This Woman's Work"	–	✔	✔	N/A
Episode 13 (Monday, October 31, 2022) (Halloween)	Camila	2	"What the World Needs Now Is Love"	Morgan Myles	Chello	"Hold On"	–	Team full	N/A	–
Episode 13 (Monday, October 31, 2022) (Halloween)	Camila	2	"What the World Needs Now Is Love"	Morgan Myles	Orlando Mendez	"Live Like You Were Dying"	–	Team full	N/A	–
Episode 13 (Monday, October 31, 2022) (Halloween)	John	3	"I'd Rather Go Blind"	Parijita Bastola	Peyton Aldridge	"Forever After All"	N/A	Team full	–	–
Episode 13 (Monday, October 31, 2022) (Halloween)	John	3	"I'd Rather Go Blind"	Parijita Bastola	Valarie Harding	"Weak"	N/A	Team full	–	–
Episode 13 (Monday, October 31, 2022) (Halloween)	Gwen	4	"Hey Ya!"	Kique	Destiny Leigh	"Impossible"	–	Team full	–	–
Episode 13 (Monday, October 31, 2022) (Halloween)	Gwen	4	"Hey Ya!"	Kique	Rowan Grace	"Vienna"	–	Team full	–	✔
Episode 14 (Tuesday, November 1, 2022)	John	1	"Radioactive"	Omar Jose Cardona	Ian Harrison	"Cough Syrup"	N/A	Team full	–	Team full
Episode 14 (Tuesday, November 1, 2022)	John	1	"Radioactive"	Omar Jose Cardona	Morgan Taylor	"I Got You (I Feel Good)"	N/A	Team full	–	Team full
Episode 14 (Tuesday, November 1, 2022)	Camila	2	"Ex's & Oh's"	Eric Who	Jaeden Luke	"Stay"	–	Team full	N/A	Team full
Episode 14 (Tuesday, November 1, 2022)	Camila	2	"Ex's & Oh's"	Eric Who	Reina Ley	"You Say"	–	Team full	N/A	Team full
Episode 14 (Tuesday, November 1, 2022)	Blake	3	"Colder Weather"	Bryce Leatherwood	Jay Allen	"Prayed for You"	–	Team full	–	Team full
Episode 14 (Tuesday, November 1, 2022)	Blake	3	"Colder Weather"	Bryce Leatherwood	Kate Kalvach	"Anyone"	✔	Team full	✔	Team full
Episode 15 (Monday, November 7, 2022)	Gwen	1	"Can We Talk"	Justin Aaron	Cara Brindisi	"Love Me Like a Man"	–	Team full	Team full	Team full
Episode 15 (Monday, November 7, 2022)	Gwen	1	"Can We Talk"	Justin Aaron	Kayla Von Der Heide	"Losing My Religion"	–	Team full	Team full	Team full
Episode 15 (Monday, November 7, 2022)	Blake	2	"Mercy"	Brayden Lape	Austin Montgomery	"You Look So Good in Love"	–	Team full	Team full	Team full
Episode 15 (Monday, November 7, 2022)	Blake	2	"Mercy"	Brayden Lape	Eva Ullmann	"Dangerous Woman"	–	Team full	Team full	Team full
Episode 15 (Monday, November 7, 2022)	John	3	"I Can't Stand the Rain"	Kim Cruse	Emma Brooke	"I Hope"	N/A	Team full	Team full	Team full
Episode 15 (Monday, November 7, 2022)	John	3	"I Can't Stand the Rain"	Kim Cruse	The Marilynds	"Chasing Cars"	N/A	Team full	Team full	Team full
Episode 15 (Monday, November 7, 2022)	Camila	4	"Yellow"	Devix	Andrew Igbokidi	"Everybody Hurts"	–	Team full	Team full	Team full
Episode 15 (Monday, November 7, 2022)	Camila	4	"Yellow"	Devix	Steven McMorran	"It Will Rain"	–	Team full	Team full	Team full
Episode 15 (Monday, November 7, 2022)	Gwen	5	"Don't Stop Me Now"	Alyssa Witrado	Daysia	"Get Here"	–	Team full	Team full	Team full
Episode 15 (Monday, November 7, 2022)	Gwen	5	"Don't Stop Me Now"	Alyssa Witrado	Sasha Hurtado	"Make It Rain"	✔	Team full	Team full	Team full

== Live shows ==
Live shows color key
Artist was saved by public's vote
Artist was saved by his/her coach
Artist was selected to compete in the Wild Card instant save
Artist was placed in the bottom group and competed for an Instant Save
Artist was instantly saved
Artist was eliminated

=== Week 1: Top 16 – Playoffs (November 14–15) ===
The Live Playoffs comprised episodes 16 and 17.

The Top 16 artists, four from each team, performed on Monday, November 14. This is the third time in the series' history, former two occasions in season 1 and season 4, in which only sixteen contestants competed in the Live Playoffs.

On Tuesday, November 15, two artists from each team were saved by getting the most overnight public votes per team. Each coach then selected one more artist from their team to advance, leaving four artists (one from each team) to compete for the Wild Card instant save.

Top 16 results
Episode	Coach	Order	Artist	Song	Result
Episode 16 (Monday, November 14, 2022)	John Legend	1	Omar Jose Cardona	"Livin' on a Prayer"	Public's vote
Episode 16 (Monday, November 14, 2022)	John Legend	2	Kim Cruse	"I Never Loved a Man (The Way I Love You)"	John's choice
Episode 16 (Monday, November 14, 2022)	John Legend	3	Sasha Hurtado	"Tiny Dancer"	Wild Card
Episode 16 (Monday, November 14, 2022)	John Legend	4	Parijita Bastola	"I'll Never Love Again"	Public's vote
Episode 16 (Monday, November 14, 2022)	Gwen Stefani	5	Kique	"As It Was"	Public's vote
Episode 16 (Monday, November 14, 2022)	Gwen Stefani	6	Kevin Hawkins	"Skate"	Wild Card
Episode 16 (Monday, November 14, 2022)	Gwen Stefani	7	Alyssa Witrado	"Angels like You"	Gwen's choice
Episode 16 (Monday, November 14, 2022)	Gwen Stefani	8	Justin Aaron	"Here and Now"	Public's vote
Episode 16 (Monday, November 14, 2022)	Camila Cabello	9	Morgan Myles	"Let Him Fly"	Public's vote
Episode 16 (Monday, November 14, 2022)	Camila Cabello	10	Eric Who	"Rumour Has It"	Camila's choice
Episode 16 (Monday, November 14, 2022)	Camila Cabello	11	Kate Kalvach	"You're Still the One"	Wild Card
Episode 16 (Monday, November 14, 2022)	Camila Cabello	12	Devix	"Sex on Fire"	Public's vote
Episode 16 (Monday, November 14, 2022)	Blake Shelton	13	Bryce Leatherwood	"I'm Gonna Be Somebody"	Wild Card
Episode 16 (Monday, November 14, 2022)	Blake Shelton	14	Rowan Grace	"Hopelessly Devoted to You"	Blake's choice
Episode 16 (Monday, November 14, 2022)	Blake Shelton	15	Brayden Lape	"Buy Dirt"	Public's vote
Episode 16 (Monday, November 14, 2022)	Blake Shelton	16	Bodie	"Glimpse of Us"	Public's vote
Episode 17 (Tuesday, November 15, 2022)	Blake Shelton	1	Bryce Leatherwood	"Let Me Down Easy"	Wild Card Winner
Episode 17 (Tuesday, November 15, 2022)	John Legend	2	Sasha Hurtado	"Elastic Heart"	Eliminated
Episode 17 (Tuesday, November 15, 2022)	Gwen Stefani	3	Kevin Hawkins	"Redbone"	Eliminated
Episode 17 (Tuesday, November 15, 2022)	Camila Cabello	4	Kate Kalvach	"When I Look at You"	Eliminated

Non-competition performances
Order	Performers	Song
17.1	Charlie Puth	"That's Hilarious"/"Left and Right"

=== Week 2: Top 13 (November 21–22) ===
This week's theme was "Songs That Changed My Life."

This season continued with the elimination format that returned in the previous season, in which not every coach was guaranteed an artist in the finale. The top nine artists were saved by the public's vote, while the remaining four artists, who received the fewest votes, competed for the Instant Save in the results show.

In contrast to the last season, the artist's songs were not available for purchase on iTunes.

Top 13 results
Episode	Coach	Order	Artist	Song	Result
Episode 18 (Monday, November 21, 2022)	Gwen Stefani	1	Kique	"Superstition"	Bottom four
Episode 18 (Monday, November 21, 2022)	Blake Shelton	2	Bryce Leatherwood	"Amarillo by Morning"	Public's vote
Episode 18 (Monday, November 21, 2022)	Camila Cabello	3	Devix	"R U Mine?"	Bottom four
Episode 18 (Monday, November 21, 2022)	Blake Shelton	4	Rowan Grace	"The Winner Takes It All"	Public's vote
Episode 18 (Monday, November 21, 2022)	John Legend	5	Omar Jose Cardona	"In the Name of Love"	Public's vote
Episode 18 (Monday, November 21, 2022)	Gwen Stefani	6	Alyssa Witrado	"Dreaming of You"	Bottom four
Episode 18 (Monday, November 21, 2022)	Blake Shelton	7	Bodie	"I'm Gonna Be (500 Miles)"	Public's vote
Episode 18 (Monday, November 21, 2022)	John Legend	8	Kim Cruse	"Always on My Mind"	Public's vote
Episode 18 (Monday, November 21, 2022)	Blake Shelton	9	Brayden Lape	"Come Over"	Public's vote
Episode 18 (Monday, November 21, 2022)	Camila Cabello	10	Eric Who	"Can't Help Falling in Love"	Bottom four
Episode 18 (Monday, November 21, 2022)	Camila Cabello	11	Morgan Myles	"If I Were a Boy"	Public's vote
Episode 18 (Monday, November 21, 2022)	John Legend	12	Parijita Bastola	"All I Ask"	Public's vote
Episode 18 (Monday, November 21, 2022)	Gwen Stefani	13	Justin Aaron	"Break Every Chain"	Public's vote
Episode 19 (Tuesday, November 22, 2022)	Camila Cabello	1	Eric Who	"The Climb"	Eliminated
Episode 19 (Tuesday, November 22, 2022)	Gwen Stefani	2	Alyssa Witrado	"Ocean Eyes"	Eliminated
Episode 19 (Tuesday, November 22, 2022)	Camila Cabello	3	Devix	"When You Were Young"	Eliminated
Episode 19 (Tuesday, November 22, 2022)	Gwen Stefani	4	Kique	"Earned It (Fifty Shades of Grey)"	Instantly Saved

Non-competition performances
Order	Performers	Song
19.1	Blake Shelton and his team (Bodie, Rowan Grace, Brayden Lape, and Bryce Leatherwood)	"Southern Nights"
19.2	Camila Cabello and her team (Devix, Morgan Myles, and Eric Who)	"Happy Together"

=== Week 3: Top 10 (November 28–29) ===
This week's theme was "Fan Week"; the viewers selected the songs the ten artists performed.

The top seven artists were saved by the public's vote, while the remaining three artists, who received the fewest votes, competed for the Instant Save in the results show.

With Kim Cruse being instantly saved, this was the third time since season 16 that John Legend took three contestants into the semi-final (first time in season 17, and second in season 19).

In contrast, with Kique being eliminated, Gwen Stefani and Camila Cabello both had only one artist left on their team, marking the first time since season 16 that two coaches took one artist each to the semi-final.

Top 10 results
Episode	Coach	Order	Artist	Song	Result
Episode 20 (Monday, November 28, 2022)	John Legend	1	Parijita Bastola	"Scars to Your Beautiful"	Public's vote
Episode 20 (Monday, November 28, 2022)	Blake Shelton	2	Rowan Grace	"i love you"	Bottom three
Episode 20 (Monday, November 28, 2022)	Gwen Stefani	3	Justin Aaron	"Just Once"	Public's vote
Episode 20 (Monday, November 28, 2022)	Blake Shelton	4	Brayden Lape	"Homesick"	Public's vote
Episode 20 (Monday, November 28, 2022)	John Legend	5	Kim Cruse	"Love on the Brain"	Bottom three
Episode 20 (Monday, November 28, 2022)	Blake Shelton	6	Bryce Leatherwood	"Sand in My Boots"	Public's vote
Episode 20 (Monday, November 28, 2022)	Gwen Stefani	7	Kique (Note: Kique tested positive for COVID-19, so the show aired his pre-recorded performance from rehearsals.)	"Call Out My Name"	Bottom three
Episode 20 (Monday, November 28, 2022)	Camila Cabello	8	Morgan Myles	"Tennessee Whiskey"	Public's vote
Episode 20 (Monday, November 28, 2022)	Blake Shelton	9	Bodie	"golden hour"	Public's vote
Episode 20 (Monday, November 28, 2022)	John Legend	10	Omar Jose Cardona	"I Want to Know What Love Is"	Public's vote
Episode 21 (Tuesday, November 29, 2022)	Blake Shelton	1	Rowan Grace	"Landslide"	Eliminated
Episode 21 (Tuesday, November 29, 2022)	Gwen Stefani	2	Kique (Note: The show aired Kique's pre-recorded Instant Save performance.)	"River"	Eliminated
Episode 21 (Tuesday, November 29, 2022)	John Legend	3	Kim Cruse	"Believe"	Instantly Saved

Non-competition performances
Order	Performers	Song
21.1	John Legend and his team (Parijita Bastola, Omar Jose Cardona, and Kim Cruse)	"The Weight"
21.2	Gwen Stefani and her team (Justin Aaron) (Note: Gwen Stefani and Justin Aaron performed a duet because Kique was unable to perform live.))	"Burning Down the House"

=== Week 4: Top 8 – Semifinals (December 5–6) ===
The semifinals consisted of episodes 22 and 23.

The eight semifinalists each performed a solo song and a Whitney Houston duet with a fellow semifinalist on Monday, with the results following on Tuesday. The four artists with the most votes automatically moved on to the finale, while the remaining four artists competed in the Instant Save for the fifth and final spot in the finale.

With the elimination of Justin Aaron, this was Stefani's third time (in her six seasons as a coach) that she did not have an artist in the finale; this was also the first time in the show's history that Legend (with Parajita Bastola, Omar Jose Cardona, and Kim Cruse) had three artists competing for the instant save.

In contrast, with the advancement of Morgan Myles to the finale, Camila Cabello became the sixth new coach to successfully coach an artist on her team to the finale on her first attempt as a coach, after Usher (Michelle Chamuel in season 4), Alicia Keys (Wé McDonald in season 11), Kelly Clarkson (Brynn Cartelli in season 14), John Legend (Maelyn Jarmon in season 16), and Nick Jonas (Thunderstorm Artis in season 18).

In addition, with the advancement of all three Team Blake members, this was the third time in the series history that a coach had three artists in the finals and the second time that Blake had three artists in the finale; the first was done by Team Adam in season 7 and the second was Team Blake in season 16. Bryce Leatherwood from Team Blake also became the second Wild card Instant Save winner to make it to the finale, after Hailey Mia in season 21.

Semifinals results
Episode	Coach	Order	Artist	Solo song	Whitney Houston duet	Result
Episode 22 (Monday, December 5, 2022)	Gwen Stefani	1 (9)	Justin Aaron	"Stand Up"	"Greatest Love of All"	Bottom four
Episode 22 (Monday, December 5, 2022)	Blake Shelton	3 (5)	Brayden Lape	"In Case You Didn't Know"	"I Wanna Dance with Somebody (Who Loves Me)"	Public's vote
Episode 22 (Monday, December 5, 2022)	John Legend	4 (11)	Parijita Bastola	"Unstoppable"	"I'm Every Woman"	Bottom four
Episode 22 (Monday, December 5, 2022)	John Legend	6 (11)	Kim Cruse	"Summertime"	"I'm Every Woman"	Bottom four
Episode 22 (Monday, December 5, 2022)	John Legend	7 (9)	Omar Jose Cardona	"My Heart Will Go On"	"Greatest Love of All"	Bottom four
Episode 22 (Monday, December 5, 2022)	Blake Shelton	8 (5)	Bodie	"Without Me"	"I Wanna Dance with Somebody (Who Loves Me)"	Public's vote
Episode 22 (Monday, December 5, 2022)	Blake Shelton	10 (2)	Bryce Leatherwood	"If Heaven Wasn't So Far Away"	"Saving All My Love for You"	Public's vote
Episode 22 (Monday, December 5, 2022)	Camila Cabello	12 (2)	Morgan Myles	"Always Remember Us This Way"	"Saving All My Love for You"	Public's vote
Episode 23 (Tuesday, December 6, 2022)	John Legend	1	Parijita Bastola	"Make You Feel My Love"		Eliminated
Episode 23 (Tuesday, December 6, 2022)	John Legend	2	Kim Cruse	"All by Myself"		Eliminated
Episode 23 (Tuesday, December 6, 2022)	Gwen Stefani	3	Justin Aaron	"Made a Way"		Eliminated
Episode 23 (Tuesday, December 6, 2022)	John Legend	4	Omar Jose Cardona	"You and I"		Instantly Saved

Non-competition performances
Order	Performers	Song
23.1	Blake Shelton	"No Body"
23.2	John Legend	"Nervous"
23.3	Carly Pearce	"What He Didn't Do"

=== Week 5: Finale (December 12–13) ===
The Top 5 finalists performed two songs on Monday and a duet with their coach on Tuesday. This is the third consecutive season in which contestants did not perform original songs on the finale.

With the victory of Bryce Leatherwood, he became the first Wild Card winner to win the entire competition. This also marks Blake's ninth and final overall win and the first time that a coach took 3 artists to the finale and won the season.

In addition, this was the third season to have the winner and runner-up from the same team, following seasons 3 (with Cassadee Pope and Terry McDermott) and 18 (with Todd Tilghman and Toneisha Harris). (All three of these occurrences occurred on Team Blake.)

Finale results
Coach	Artist	Episode 24 (Monday, December 12, 2022)				Episode 25 (Tuesday, December 13, 2022)		Result
Coach	Artist	Order	Artistry Song	Order	Dedication Song	Order	Duet (with coach)	Result
Blake Shelton	Bodie	1	"Late Night Talking"	9	"Gratitude"	15	"God's Country"	Runner-up
Camila Cabello	Morgan Myles	2	"Total Eclipse of the Heart"	7	"Girl Crush"	14	"Never Be the Same"	Third place
Blake Shelton	Brayden Lape	6	"Wild as Her"	3	"Humble and Kind"	13	"Chasin' That Neon Rainbow"	Fifth place
John Legend	Omar Jose Cardona	10	"Somebody to Love"	4	"The Way You Make Me Feel"	12	"Signed, Sealed, Delivered (I'm Yours)"	Fourth place
Blake Shelton	Bryce Leatherwood	8	"T-R-O-U-B-L-E"	5	"Don't Close Your Eyes"	11	"Hillbilly Bone"	Winner

Non-competition performances
Order	Performers	Song
24.1	John Legend, Gwen Stefani, Camila Cabello, and Blake Shelton	"The Christmas Song"
25.1	OneRepublic	"I Ain't Worried"
25.2	Adam Lambert	"Ordinary World"
25.3	Maluma	"Junio"/"Tukoh Taka"
25.4	Girl Named Tom	"One More Christmas"
25.5	Breland	"For What It's Worth"
25.6	Kane Brown and Blake Shelton	"Different Man"
25.7	Kelly Clarkson	"Santa, Can't You Hear Me"

== Elimination chart ==
Results color key
Winner	Saved by an instant save (via Voice App)
Runner-up	Saved by the public
Third place	Saved by their coach
Fourth place	Saved by Wildcard (via Voice App)
Fifth place	Eliminated

Coaches color key
Team Legend
Team Gwen
Team Camila
Team Blake

=== Overall ===
Live shows' results per week
Artists	Week 1 Playoffs	Week 2	Week 3	Week 4	Week 5 Finale
Bryce Leatherwood	Safe	Safe	Safe	Safe	Winner
Bodie	Safe	Safe	Safe	Safe	Runner-up
Morgan Myles	Safe	Safe	Safe	Safe	3rd place
Omar Jose Cardona	Safe	Safe	Safe	Safe	4th place
Brayden Lape	Safe	Safe	Safe	Safe	5th place
Justin Aaron	Safe	Safe	Safe	Eliminated	Eliminated (Week 4)
Kim Cruse	Safe	Safe	Safe	Eliminated	Eliminated (Week 4)
Parijita Bastola	Safe	Safe	Safe	Eliminated	Eliminated (Week 4)
Kique	Safe	Safe	Eliminated	Eliminated (Week 3)	
Rowan Grace	Safe	Safe	Eliminated	Eliminated (Week 3)	
Alyssa Witrado	Safe	Eliminated	Eliminated (Week 2)		
Devix	Safe	Eliminated	Eliminated (Week 2)		
Eric Who	Safe	Eliminated	Eliminated (Week 2)		
Kate Kalvach	Eliminated	Eliminated (Week 1)			
Kevin Hawkins	Eliminated	Eliminated (Week 1)			
Sasha Hurtado	Eliminated	Eliminated (Week 1)			

=== Per team ===
Live shows' results per team
Artists	Week 1 Playoffs	Week 2	Week 3	Week 4	Week 5 Finale
Omar Jose Cardona	Public's vote	Advanced	Advanced	Advanced	Fourth place
Parijita Bastola	Public's vote	Advanced	Advanced	Eliminated	
Kim Cruse	Coach's choice	Advanced	Advanced	Eliminated	
Sasha Hurtado	Eliminated				
Justin Aaron	Public's vote	Advanced	Advanced	Eliminated	
Kique	Public's vote	Advanced	Eliminated		
Alyssa Witrado	Coach's choice	Eliminated			
Kevin Hawkins	Eliminated				
Morgan Myles	Public's vote	Advanced	Advanced	Advanced	Third place
Devix	Public's vote	Eliminated			
Eric Who	Coach's choice	Eliminated			
Kate Kalvach	Eliminated				
Bryce Leatherwood	Public's vote	Advanced	Advanced	Advanced	Winner
Bodie	Public's vote	Advanced	Advanced	Advanced	Runner-up
Brayden Lape	Public's vote	Advanced	Advanced	Advanced	Fifth place
Rowan Grace	Coach's choice	Advanced	Eliminated		

Rank	Coach	Top 13	Top 10	Top 8	Top 5
1	Blake Shelton	4	4	3	3
2	Camila Cabello	3	1	1	1
3	John Legend	3	3	3	1
4	Gwen Stefani	3	2	1	0

== Ratings ==
Viewership and ratings per episode of The Voice season 22
No.	Title	Air date	Timeslot (ET)	Rating (18–49)	Viewers (millions)
1	"The Blind Auditions, Season Premiere"	September 19, 2022	Monday 8:00 p.m.	0.7	6.12
2	"The Blind Auditions, Part 2"	September 20, 2022	Tuesday 8:00 p.m.	0.7	6.19
3	"The Blind Auditions, Part 3"	September 26, 2022	Monday 8:00 p.m.	0.7	6.11
4	"The Blind Auditions, Part 4"	September 27, 2022	Tuesday 8:00 p.m.	0.7	6.06
5	"The Blind Auditions, Part 5"	October 3, 2022	Monday 8:00 p.m.	0.7	6.56
6	"The Blind Auditions, Part 6"	October 4, 2022	Tuesday 8:00 p.m.	0.7	6.47
7	"The Blind Auditions, Part 7"	October 10, 2022	Monday 8:00 p.m.	0.7	6.48
8	"The Battles Premiere"	October 11, 2022	Tuesday 8:00 p.m.	0.6	6.33
9	"The Battles, Part 2"	October 17, 2022	Monday 8:00 p.m.	0.7	6.22
10	"The Battles, Part 3"	October 18, 2022	Tuesday 8:00 p.m.	0.6	6.13
11	"The Battles, Part 4"	October 24, 2022	Monday 8:00 p.m.	0.6	5.77
12	"The Battles, Part 5"	October 25, 2022	Tuesday 8:00 p.m.	0.6	5.95
13	"The Knockouts Premiere"	October 31, 2022	Monday 8:00 p.m.	0.6	6.26
14	"The Knockouts, Part 2"	November 1, 2022	Tuesday 8:00 p.m.	0.6	5.81
15	"The Knockouts, Part 3"	November 7, 2022	Monday 8:00 p.m.	0.6	5.87
16	"Live Top 16 Performances"	November 14, 2022	Monday 8:00 p.m.	0.7	5.69
17	"Live Top 16 Results"	November 15, 2022	Tuesday 8:00 p.m.	0.7	5.89
18	"Live Top 13 Performances"	November 21, 2022	Monday 8:00 p.m.	0.6	5.98
19	"Live Top 13 Results"	November 22, 2022	Tuesday 8:00 p.m.	0.6	6.19
20	"Live Top 10 Performances"	November 28, 2022	Monday 8:00 p.m.	0.7	6.22
21	"Live Top 10 Results"	November 29, 2022	Tuesday 8:00 p.m.	0.7	6.79
22	"Live Semi-Final Top 8 Performances"	December 5, 2022	Monday 8:00 p.m.	0.7	6.32
23	"Live Semi-Final Top 8 Results"	December 6, 2022	Tuesday 8:00 p.m.	0.6	6.48
24	"Live Finale, Part 1"	December 12, 2022	Monday 8:00 p.m.	0.7	6.90
25	"Live Cutdown Show"	December 13, 2022	Tuesday 8:00 p.m.	0.5	5.30
26	"Live Finale, Part 2"	December 13, 2022	Tuesday 9:00 p.m.	0.7	6.95
