= Bryce Leatherwood =

- Born: February 4, 2000 (age 25); Woodstock, Georgia, U.S.
- Genres: Country
- Occupation: Singer
- Instruments: Vocals; Guitar
- Years active: 2022–present
- Labels: Universal Music Group
- Website: bryce-leatherwood.com

Bryce Leatherwood (born February 4, 2000) is an American country singer. He is the winner of season 22 of the American talent competition The Voice, He has the distinction of being the first winner of the show to be a Wildcard artist during the live playoffs. He competed on the team coached by Blake Shelton, earning Shelton his ninth and final win as a coach on the show.

== Early life ==
Leatherwood was born and raised in Woodstock, Georgia. Leatherwood cited traditional country artists such as George Jones, Merle Haggard, and Conway Twitty as his inspirations when it came to deciding to learn the guitar and pursue music. Leatherwood also stated that he would work on his grandfather's farm during his childhood summers and that his grandfather introduced him to the traditional country artists who inspired Leatherwood's career path.

Leatherwood attended Hickory Flat Elementary School in Canton, Georgia, Dean Rusk Middle School in Cherokee County, Georgia, and Sequoyah High School. Leatherwood was the captain of his wrestling team in high school and participated in several regional tournaments.

== Career ==
=== 2022: The Voice ===
Performances on The Voice season 22
Round	Theme	Song	Original Artist	Order	Original Air Date	Result
Blind Auditions	—N/a	"Goodbye Time"	Conway Twitty	2.2	Sept. 20, 2022	John Legend, Gwen Stefani, and Blake Shelton turned Joined Team Blake
Battles (Top 56)	—N/a	"Red Dirt Road" (vs. The Dryes)	Brooks & Dunn	12.6	Oct. 25, 2022	Saved by Blake
Knockouts (Top 36)	—N/a	"Colder Weather" (vs. Jay Allen & Kate Kalvach)	Zac Brown Band	14.3	Nov. 1, 2022	Saved by Blake
Live Playoffs (Top 16)	—N/a	"I'm Gonna Be Somebody"	Travis Tritt	16.13	Nov. 14, 2022	Wildcard
Wild Card Instant Save	—N/a	"Let Me Down Easy"	Billy Currington	17.1	Nov. 15, 2022	Wildcard winner
Live Top 13	"Songs that Changed My Life"	"Amarillo by Morning"	Terry Stafford	18.2	Nov. 21, 2022	Saved by public's vote
Live Top 10	"Fan Week"	"Sand in My Boots"	Morgan Wallen	20.6	Nov. 28, 2022	Saved by public's vote
Live Top 8	—N/a	"If Heaven Wasn't So Far Away"	Justin Moore	22.10	Dec. 5, 2022	Saved by public's vote
Live Top 8	"Whitney Houston duet with another artist"	"Saving All My Love for You" (with Morgan Myles)	Whitney Houston	22.2	Dec. 5, 2022	Saved by public's vote
Live Finale (Final 5)	"Artistry song"	"T-R-O-U-B-L-E"	Travis Tritt	24.8	Dec. 12, 2022	Winner
Live Finale (Final 5)	"Dedication song"	"Don't Close Your Eyes"	Keith Whitley	24.5	Dec. 12, 2022	Winner
Live Finale (Final 5)	"Duet with coach"	"Hillbilly Bone" (with Blake Shelton)	Blake Shelton	25.11	Dec. 13, 2022	Winner

In 2022, Leatherwood entered the 22nd season of The Voice, auditioning with "Goodbye Time" by Conway Twitty, based on Blake Shelton's 2004 cover of the song. Three of the four coaches, John Legend, Gwen Stefani, and Shelton, turned their chairs for him, with Leatherwood choosing to become a member of Team Blake. Throughout his run on the season, Leatherwood was characterized as a "country today, country tomorrow" artist.

Leatherwood advance to the finale, where he was named as the winner of the season on December 13, 2022, earning a $100,000 prize and a record deal with Universal Music Group. His victory marked Shelton's ninth and final win as a coach on The Voice, as well as the first instance in which the winner of the Wildcard instant save would go on to win the season. His win prompted mixed reactions online.

=== 2023–present: After The Voice ===
Since winning The Voice, Leatherwood has played at his coach Blake Shelton's bar chain, Ole Red, on multiple occasions. He has traveled to Tishomingo, Oklahoma; Orlando, Florida; and Gatlinburg, Tennessee, to play at many of Ole Red's locations. Leatherwood also moved to Nashville, Tennessee, to pursue music full time.

On May 23, 2023, Leatherwood performed "Good Riddance (Time of Your Life)" on the season 23 finale with other former Team Blake artists to commemorate Blake Shelton's last episode on the show. On December 18, 2023, Leatherwood returned to The Voice during the season 24 finale episode to perform his first major label single, "The Finger". By mid-December 2023, "The Finger" had been streamed over 500,000 times and peaked at #12 on the iTunes country music chart. In a December 2023 interview, Leatherwood stated that he had written 78 songs in preparation for an upcoming debut studio album he planned to release in September 2024, in addition to going on tour with multiple country music artists, including Dwight Yoakam.

In February 2024, Leatherwood released a second single, "Neon Does," which he co-wrote alongside songwriters Alex Maxwell and Matt McKinney. In April 2024, Leatherwood embarked on the Neon Does Tour throughout several southern and midwestern states to promote his singles.

In April 2024, Leatherwood released his third single, "The One My Daddy Found," as a tribute to his mother and his parents' 25-year marriage. The music video for "The One My Daddy Found" released in May 2024, in honor of Mother's Day.

On September 6, 2024, Leatherwood released his debut country radio single, "Hung Up on You". The song's credited writers, Brandon Lay, Jeff Middleton, and Neil Medley, worked on composing the song for a decade prior to introducing it to Leatherwood's management team in January 2023. By September 23, 45 different country radio stations had added the song to their playlists, and it was declared the "most added" song on country radio at the time of its release. On September 14, Leatherwood delivered his debut performance at the Grand Ole Opry, where he played "Hung Up on You" as well as "Shenandoah", a previously unreleased song; Leatherwood later called his Grand Ole Opry performance "the best night of [his] life".

In October 2024, Leatherwood stated in an interview that he was still working on his debut album.

== Personal life ==
Leatherwood attended Georgia Southern University, studying for a degree in business. In late 2021, while at Georgia Southern, he started a band. Leatherwood resided in Statesboro, Georgia, prior to his move to Nashville.

In May 2024, Leatherwood revealed that he was in a relationship, although he preferred to keep his girlfriend's identity private.

== Discography ==
=== Studio albums ===
List of studio album
Title	Details
Bryce Leatherwood	Released: May 16, 2025; Label: Mercury Nashville; Formats: Digital download, streaming Cd

=== Singles ===
List of singles, showing year released, selected chart positions, and the name of the album
Title	Year	Peak chart positions	Album
Title	Year	US Country Airplay	Album
"Hung Up on You"	2024	56	Bryce Leatherwood

Awards and achievements
Preceded by Girl Named Tom	The Voice (American); Winner; 2022 (Fall)	Succeeded by Gina Miles
Preceded by "The Chain"	The Voice (American); Winner's song "T-R-O-U-B-L-E"; 2022 (Fall)	Succeeded by "Style"
