= Bodie (musician) =

- Also known as: Bodie
- Born: Bodie Kuljian; July 12, 1993 (age 33)
- Genres: CCM, alternative pop, pop, rap/hiphop
- Years active: 2017–present
- Label: Provident Music Group
- Member of: Oceans Music
- Spouse: Royal Kuljian
- Website: bodie.live

Bodie Kuljian, known commercially as Bodie, is a Christian alt-pop and Christian rap musician, who has been active since 2017. He achieved 2nd place at the 22nd season of NBC's "The Voice". His 2024 song "Whisper and the Wind" reached #9 on the Billboard Christian Airplay chart. In April 2024, he signed with Provident Label Group, and released his label debut Happy to Be Here, an EP, on September 27, 2024, through Provident. In late 2024, he performed on the "Happy to Be Here" tour with Gracie Binion.

== Personal life ==
Bodie is married to Royale Kuljian. He has three children, Indie, Violet, and Goldie Kuljian.

== Discography ==
=== Albums ===
Title	Details
No Skips	Released: September 5, 2025; Label: Provident Label Group; Formats: digital download, streaming
"—" denotes a recording that did not chart or was not released in that territory.

=== Extended plays ===
Title	Details
Love at First Fight	Released: June 8, 2018; Label: Independent; Formats: digital download, streaming
Me and You (with Moflo Music)	Released: September 20, 2019; Label: Independent; Formats: digital download, streaming
Happy to Be Here	Released: September 27, 2024; Label: Provident Label Group; Formats: digital download, streaming
bodie Song Session (with Essential Worship)	Released: January 31, 2025; Label: Provident; Formats: digital download, streaming
Happier to Be Here	Released: March 7, 2025; Label: Provident; Formats: digital download, streaming
"—" denotes a recording that did not chart or was not released in that territory.

=== Singles ===
==== Independent ====
- "I Think I Like You" (2017)
- "Moonlight" (2017)
- "Magazine Girls" (2018)
- "Mona Lisa" (2018)
- "New World" (with Moflo Music) (2018)
- "Loving U" (with Moflo Music and Reagan Capaci) (2018)
- "Love Me Like That" (2019)
- "Trust Issues" (with Moflo Music) (2019)
- "Off Brand" (Reagan Capaci with Moflo Music and Bodie) (2019)
- "Summer Love" (2020)
- "Me Time" (with Gnash) (2020)
- "Lovely" (with Loren North) (2020)
- "Happy Now" (2021)
- "All Four Season Love" (with Moflo Music) (2021)
- "Mercedes" (Hyper Fenton with Bodi and Moflo Music) (2021)
- "Ghost" (2022)
- "A New Wave" (Oceans Music with Bodie and Melanie Foust) (2022)
- "Lovin Look Easy" (2023)
- "Think About U" (2023)
- "Idc Now" (2023)
- "Strange" (2023)
- "Hallelujah (Here We Are Again)" (2023)
- "Behold" (Oceans Music with Bodie) (2023)

==== On Provident ====
Title	Year	Peak chart positions			Album
Title	Year	US Christ	US Christ Air	US Christ AC	Album
"Gratitude" (Brandon Lake cover)	2024	—	—	—	Non-album single
"RIP"	2024	—	—	—	No Skips
"God Did"	2024	—	—	—	No Skips
"Whisper and the Wind"	2024	17	11	9	No Skips
"Joy" (with Oceans Music)	2025	—	—	—	All Hail the King
"Say So"	2025	—	—	—	No Skips
"Good Old Days" (original or with CAIN)	2025	—	—	—	No Skips
"No Skips"	2025	—	—	—	No Skips
"Obsessed"	2026	—	—	—	Non-album singles
"Almost Famous"	2026	—	—	—	Non-album singles
"Go For Broke"	2026	—	36	—	Non-album singles
"Sellout"	2026	—	—	—	Non-album singles

=== Other charted songs ===
Title	Year	Peak chart positions	Album
Title	Year	AUS Christ.	Album
"Heaven Knows I Tried"	2025	14	No Skips

== Awards and nominations ==
Year	Organization	Nominee / work	Category	Result	Ref.
2025	We Love Awards	"Whisper and the Wind (remix)" (featuring Grace Binion)	Dance / Remix Song of the Year	Won	
2026	Dove Awards	Himself	New Artist of the Year	Pending	
