= Sofronio =

Sofronio may refer to:

- Sofronio Española, a 2nd class municipality in Palawan, Philippines
- Sofronio Palahang (born 1967), Filipino tennis player
- Sofronio Roxas (1938–1984), Filipino farmer and dissident against the Marcos dictatorship
- Sofronio Vasquez (born 1992), winner of The Voice season 26
