= The Voice (American TV series) season 25 =

The Voice
- Season 25
- Promotional poster featuring coaches Chance the Rapper, McEntire, Legend, and Dan + Shay
- Hosted by: Carson Daly
- Coaches: John Legend; Dan + Shay; Chance the Rapper; Reba McEntire
- No. of contestants: 40 artists
- Winner: Asher HaVon
- Winning coach: Reba McEntire
- Runner-up: Josh Sanders
- No. of episodes: 21

Release
- Original network: NBC
- Original release: February 26 – May 21, 2024

Season chronology
- ← Previous; Season 24 Next → Season 26

The twenty-fifth season of the American reality television series The Voice premiered on February 26, 2024, on NBC. The season is presented by Carson Daly, who returned as the host for his twenty-fifth season. The coaching panel consists of John Legend and Reba McEntire, who return for their ninth and second seasons, respectively; returning coach Chance the Rapper, who returns for his second season following a one-season hiatus; and debuting coaches Dan + Shay, who join the panel as the show's first coaching duo.

Asher HaVon was named the winner of the season, marking Reba McEntire's first win as a coach. With HaVon's win, he became the fifth African-American male to win the show. He was also the first openly LGBTQ person to win. Additionally, after two attempts, McEntire became the fifth female coach to win the competition, following Christina Aguilera, Alicia Keys, Kelly Clarkson, and Gwen Stefani, as well as the oldest coach to win a season. This was the fourth season in the history of the show that a coach (McEntire) had the top two artists on their team, following Blake Shelton in seasons 3, 18, and 22.

== Overview ==
=== Development ===
On June 21, 2023, NBC announced that the show would be renewed for its twenty-fifth season, to be aired in spring 2024. On November 20, the network announced that the season would premiere on February 26, 2024.

=== Coaches and host ===
Coaches and Host of The Voice Season 25

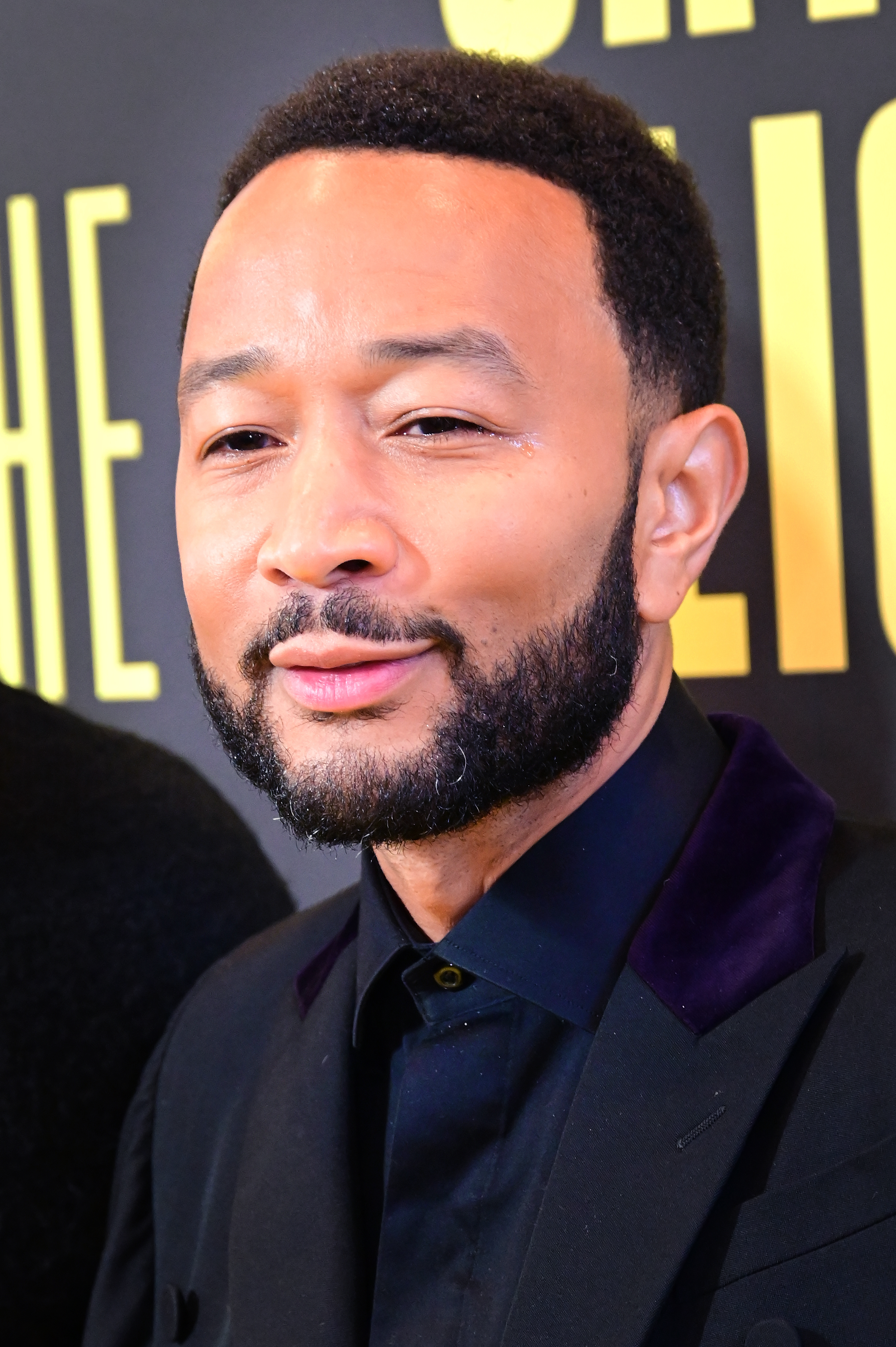
John Legend

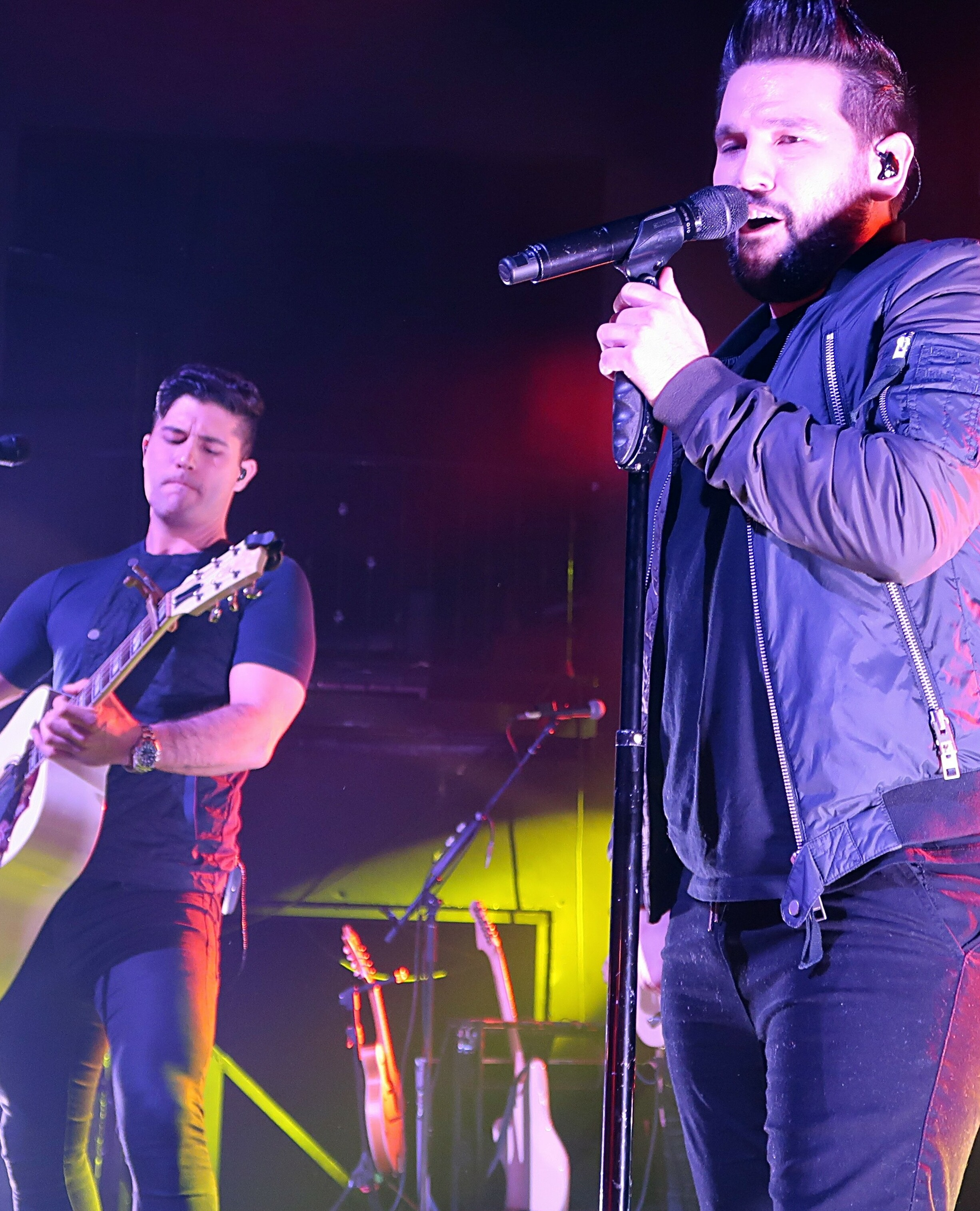
Dan + Shay

Chance the Rapper

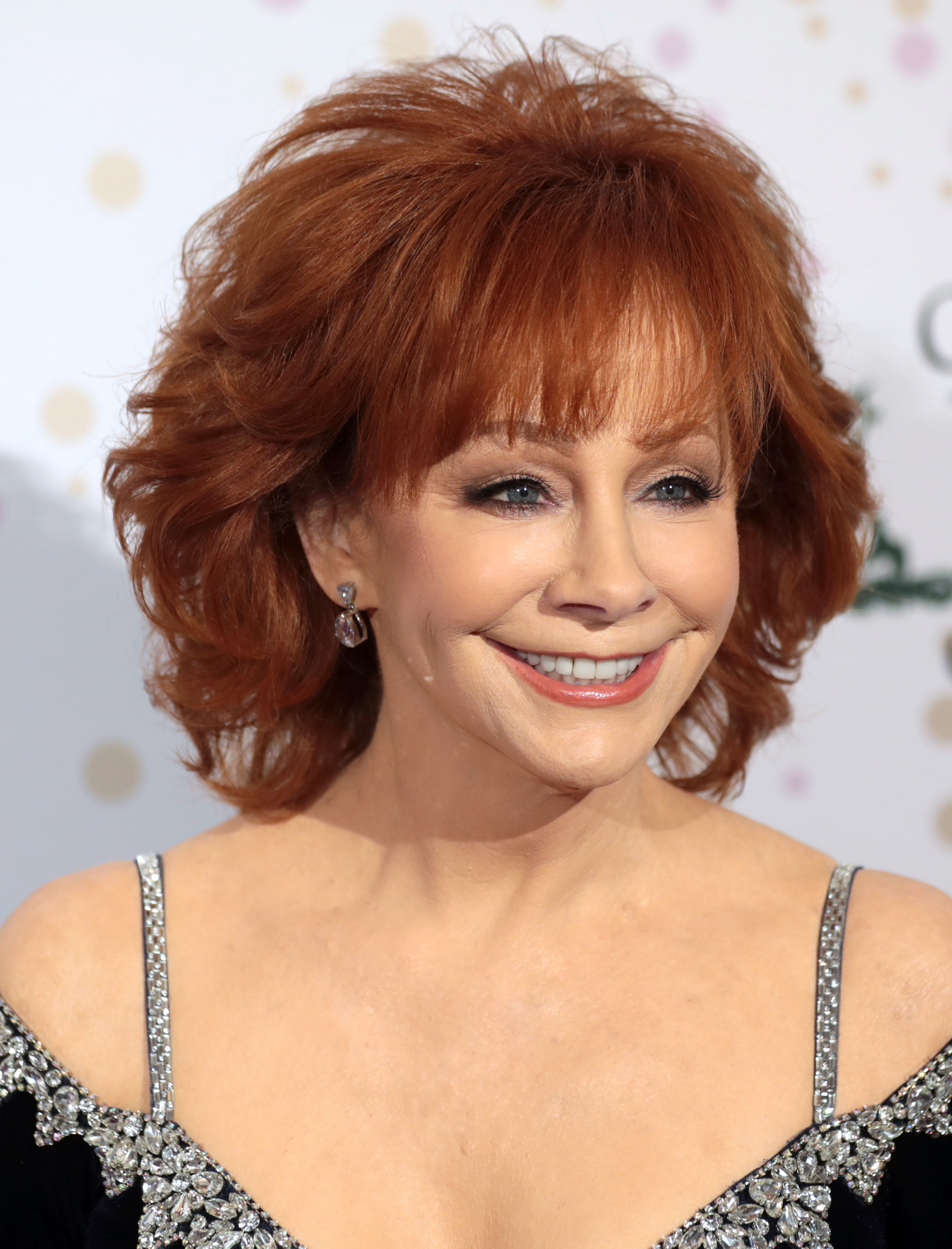
Reba McEntire

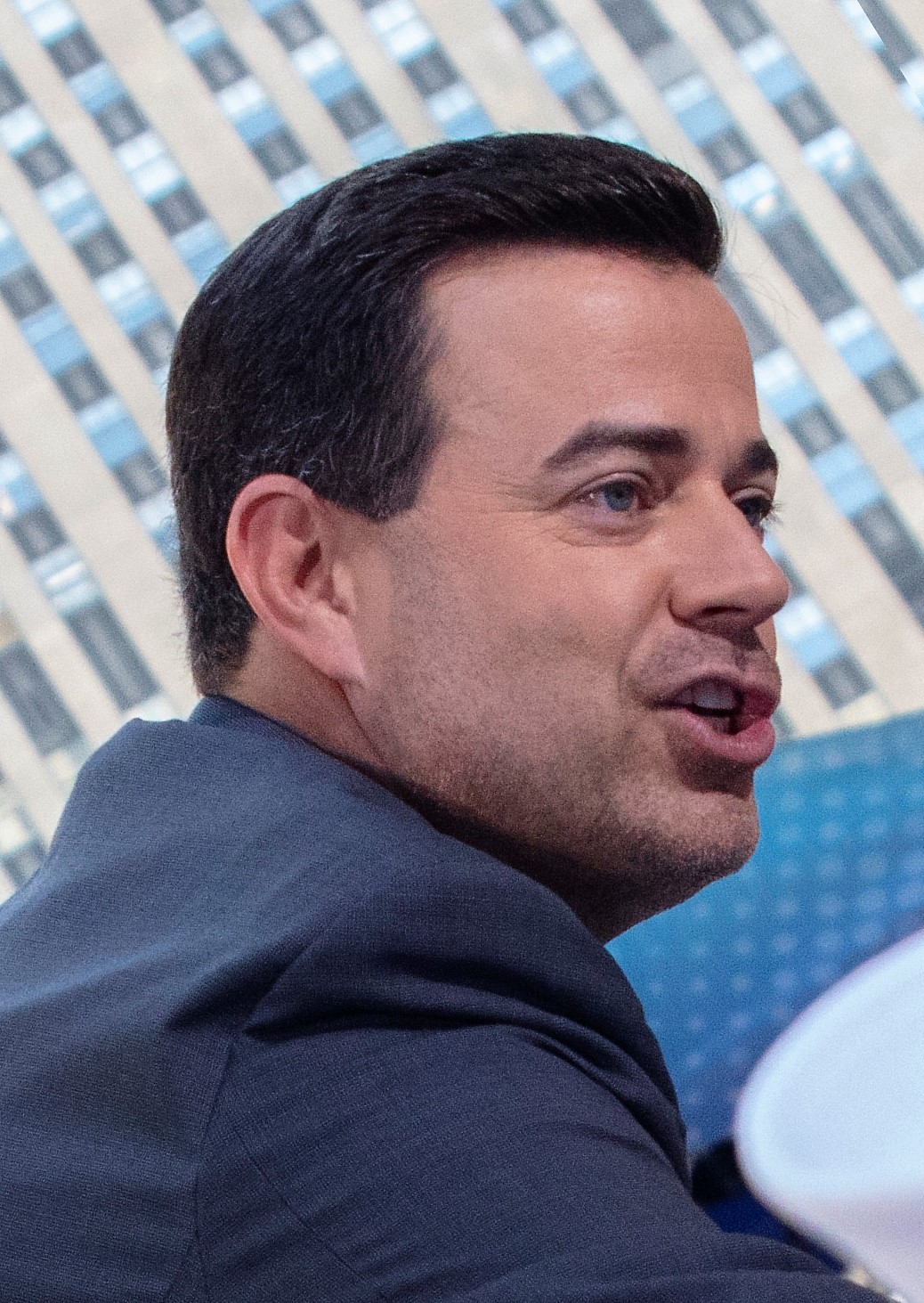
Carson Daly

Ahead of the season 24 premiere, on June 21, 2023, the show, via its social media accounts, made a surprise announcement, hinting at the addition of a duo serving as a coach in its twenty-fifth season, as part of a "double chair" twist. The next day, NBC released a press release, announcing the panel of coaches for the season.

From the four coaches that appeared in the previous season, only John Legend and Reba McEntire continue, marking their ninth and second seasons as coaches, respectively. Coaches Niall Horan and Gwen Stefani both exited the panel for the season. Horan announced that his music ventures and concert tours had factored his departure for the series.

Chance the Rapper, who debuted as a coach on season 23, returned for his second season.

Country pop duo Dan + Shay were seated as coaches for their first season. The duo previously made several appearances on the show—on seasons 15 and 19 as guest performers; on season 20, as battle advisors to Blake Shelton's team; and on the previous season, as guest coaches for Team Niall in rehearsals for the knockouts. Their debut as coaches marks the first time in which the American adaptation of the show would seat a duo as a coach.

The addition of Dan + Shay as coaches garnered interest from media publications. Cher Thompson of ScreenRant commented that the duo's addition as coaches would bring "an interesting mix on the show", and may encourage more duos to audition on the show. Meanwhile, Ryan Louis Montilla of Collider lauded their addition as "exciting."

Carson Daly returned as the host for his twenty-fifth season.

=== Mega mentor ===
On March 25, 2024, it was announced that country music singer and former The Voice Australia coach Keith Urban would serve as the mega mentor for the Knockouts. This marks Urban's second appearance as a guest mentor on the show, as he previously served as a battle advisor for Team Blake in the fifteenth season. For the third consecutive season, there were no guest advisors in the battles, meaning the artists were solely mentored by their coaches.

=== Marketing and promotion ===
Ahead of the season's premiere, on February 23, the show, via its online media platforms, released a cover of the 1969 Jackie DeShannon single "Put a Little Love in Your Heart" performed by the coaches.

Shortly prior to the season premiere, the blind audition of music trio OK3, performing Meghan Trainor's "Made You Look", was released online. Later episodes saw the auditions of Maddi Jane, Bryan Olesen, Mafe, Serenity Arce, and Val T. Webb released online as a sneak peek for their respective episodes.

== Teams ==
Teams color key
| Winner | Eliminated in the Playoffs |
| Runner-up | Stolen in the Knockouts |
| Third place | Eliminated in the Knockouts |
| Fourth place | Stolen in the Battles |
| Fifth place | Eliminated in the Battles |
| Eliminated in the Live Shows |

Coaches' teams
| Coach | Top 40 Artists | | | |
|---|---|---|---|---|
| John Legend | | | | |
| John Legend | Bryan Olesen | Nathan Chester | Zoe Levert | Kamalei Kawaʻa |
| John Legend | Mafe Miquilarena | ~~Jackie Romeo~~ | Gene Taylor | Val T. Webb |
| John Legend | ~~Olivia Rubini~~ | Rivers Grayson | OK3 | Ronnie Wilson |
| Dan + Shay | | | | |
| Dan + Shay | Karen Waldrup | Madison Curbelo | Tae Lewis | Olivia Rubini |
| Dan + Shay | Anya True | ~~Kyle Schuesler~~ | Frank Garcia | Ducote Talmage |
| Dan + Shay | ~~Justin & Jeremy Garcia~~ | Ryan Argast | Ryan Coleman | AJ Harvey |
| Chance the Rapper | | | | |
| Chance the Rapper | Maddi Jane | Serenity Arce | Nadège Mossop Herode | RLetto |
| Chance the Rapper | Kyle Schuesler | ~~Kamalei Kawaʻa~~ | Alyssa Crosby | Dani Stacy |
| Chance the Rapper | ~~Val T. Webb~~ | Corey Curtis | Bri Fletcher | Gabriel Goes |
| Reba McEntire | | | | |
| Reba McEntire | Asher HaVon | Josh Sanders | L. Rodgers | Justin & Jeremy Garcia |
| Reba McEntire | Jackie Romeo | ~~Tae Lewis~~ | Ashley Bryant | Zeya Rae |
| Reba McEntire | ~~Alyssa Crosby~~ | William Alexander | Elyscia Jefferson | Donny Van Slee |
Note: Italicized names are artists stolen from another team during the battles or the knockouts (names struck through within former teams). Underlined names are artists given a Playoff pass by his/her coach.

== Blind auditions ==
The show began with the Blind Auditions on February 26, 2024. In each audition, an artist sings their piece in front of the coaches, whose chairs are facing the audience. If a coach is interested in working with the artist, they may press their button to face the artist. If only one coach presses the button, the artist automatically becomes part of their team. If multiple coaches turn, they will compete for the artist, who will decide which team they will join. Each coach has one "block" to prevent another coach from getting an artist. This season, each coach ends up with 10 artists by the end of the blind auditions, creating a total of 40 artists advancing to the battles.

Blind auditions color key
| ✔ | Coach hit his/her "I/WE WANT YOU" button |
| | Artist defaulted to this coach's team |
| | Artist selected to join this coach's team |
| | Artist was eliminated with no coach pressing their button |
| ✘ | Coach pressed "I/WE WANT YOU" button, but was blocked by another coach from getting the artist |
| | Blocked by John; Blocked by Dan + Shay; Blocked by Chance; Blocked by Reba |

=== Episode 1 (Feb. 26) ===
First blind auditions results
| Order | Artist | Age(s) | Hometown | Song | Coach's and artist's choices | | | |
| Order | Artist | Age(s) | Hometown | Song | John | Dan + Shay | Chance | Reba |
|---|---|---|---|---|---|---|---|---|
| 1 | Dani Stacy | 31 | Hanford, California | "I Will Survive" | ✔ | ✔ | ✔ | ✘ |
| 2 | Justin & Jeremy Garcia | 17 | Millbrae, California | "Story of My Life" | – | ✔ | ✔ | ✔ |
| 3 | Tae Lewis | 31 | Goldsboro, North Carolina | "Somebody Like You" | ✔ | – | – | ✔ |
| 4 | Ryan Argast | 30 | Plainfield, Illinois | "Speechless" | – | ✔ | – | – |
| 5 | Ash Haynes | 36 | Washington, DC | "The Best" | – | – | – | – |
| 6 | Nadège (Nadège Mossop Herode) | 26 | Wellington, Florida | "Get You" | ✔ | – | ✔ | – |
| 7 | Josh Sanders | 35 | Kannapolis, North Carolina | "Whiskey on You" | – | ✔ | – | ✔ |
| 8 | OK3 (Kenna Fields, Courtney Hooker, and Sierra Sikes) | 22–25 | Oklahoma City, Oklahoma | "Made You Look" | ✔ | ✔ | ✔ | ✔ |

=== Episode 2 (Feb. 27) ===
Second blind auditions results
| Order | Artist | Age | Hometown | Song | Coach's and artist's choices | | | |
| Order | Artist | Age | Hometown | Song | John | Dan + Shay | Chance | Reba |
|---|---|---|---|---|---|---|---|---|
| 1 | Nathan Chester | 27 | Chicago, Illinois | "Take Me to the River" | ✔ | ✔ | – | – |
| 2 | Maddi Jane | 24 | Chicago, Illinois | "Escapism" | ✔ | ✔ | ✔ | ✔ |
| 3 | Devon Sutterfield | 29 | St. James, Missouri | "Cry to Me" | – | – | – | – |
| 4 | Donny Van Slee | 30 | Weeki Wachee, Florida | "Greatest Love Story" | – | ✘ | – | ✔ |
| 5 | Karen Waldrup | 36 | Mandeville, Louisiana | "Bye, Bye" | – | ✔ | – | ✘ |
| 6 | Aeden Alvarez | 21 | Chicago, Illinois | "Snooze" | – | – | – | – |
| 7 | Gabriel Goes | 21 | Honolulu, Hawaii | "What I Got" | – | – | ✔ | – |
| 8 | Gene Taylor | 33 | Vernon, New Jersey | "Lights" | ✔ | ✔ | ✔ | ✔ |

=== Episode 3 (March 4) ===
Among this episode's auditionees were Frank Garcia, who previously competed on the fourth season of La Voz Kids; and Madison Curbelo, who previously auditioned unsuccessfully in the twentieth season.

Third blind auditions results
| Order | Artist | Age | Hometown | Song | Coach's and artist's choices | | | |
| Order | Artist | Age | Hometown | Song | John | Dan + Shay | Chance | Reba |
|---|---|---|---|---|---|---|---|---|
| 1 | Bryan Olesen | 49 | Lincoln, Nebraska | "Love Runs Out" (Note: Olesen and his daughter, Jadyn Cree (who would later go on to audition in season 27), later performed a snippet of the song "Put Your Records On.") | ✔ | ✔ | – | ✔ |
| 2 | Frank Garcia | 19 | Roma, Texas | "Love in the Dark" | – | ✔ | – | – |
| 3 | Kamalei Kawaʻa | 26 | Maui, Hawaii | "Redemption Song" | – | – | ✔ | ✔ |
| 4 | Ten (Ten Smith) (Note: Presented onscreen in all caps.) | 37 | Chicago, Illinois | "Hit 'Em Up Style (Oops!)" | – | – | – | – |
| 5 | Ashley Bryant | 26 | Louisville, Kentucky | "Last Name" | – | – | – | ✔ |
| 6 | Asher HaVon | 31 | Selma, Alabama | "Set Fire to the Rain" | – | ✔ | ✔ | ✔ |
| 7 | Mecca Notes (Emeka Dibia) | 33 | New Orleans, Louisiana | "Master Blaster (Jammin')" | – | – | – | – |
| 8 | Jackie Romeo | 20 | Massapequa, New York | "Flowers" | ✔ | ✔ | – | – |
| 9 | Rivers Grayson | 27 | Muscle Shoals, Alabama | "Babylon" | ✔ | – | – | – |
| 10 | Corey Curtis | 22 | Summerville, Georgia | "Waiting on the World to Change" | – | – | ✔ | – |
| 11 | Summer Brooke | 30 | Sylva, North Carolina | "Hold On to Me" | – | – | – | – |
| 12 | Madison Curbelo | 21 | Westfield, Massachusetts | "Stand by Me" | ✔ | ✔ | ✔ | ✔ |

=== Episode 4 (March 5) ===
Fourth blind auditions results
| Order | Artist | Age | Hometown | Song | Coach's and artist's choices | | | |
| Order | Artist | Age | Hometown | Song | John | Dan + Shay | Chance | Reba |
|---|---|---|---|---|---|---|---|---|
| 1 | Anya True | 17 | Encinitas, California | "Until I Found You" | – | ✔ | ✔ | – |
| 2 | William Alexander | 16 | Staten Island, New York | "Ceilings" | – | – | ✔ | ✔ |
| 3 | Alyssa Crosby | 32 | Binghamton, New York | "Hand in My Pocket" | – | – | – | ✔ |
| 4 | RLetto (Reggie Lett) | 27 | Orlando, Florida | "Golden Hour" | – | – | ✔ | ✔ |
| 5 | Bri Fletcher | 28 | Fort Worth, Texas | "I'm With You" | – | – | ✔ | – |
| 6 | Rob Cole | 32 | Pembroke, North Carolina | "Must Be Doin' Somethin' Right" | – | – | – | – |
| 7 | Mafe (María Fernanda Miquilarena) | 22 | Miami, Florida | "Bésame Mucho" | ✔ | ✔ | ✔ | ✔ |

=== Episode 5 (March 11) ===
Among this episode's auditionees was Serenity Arce, who previously auditioned unsuccessfully in season 21.

Fifth blind auditions results
| Order | Artist | Age | Hometown | Song | Coach's and artist's choices | | | |
| Order | Artist | Age | Hometown | Song | John | Dan + Shay | Chance | Reba |
|---|---|---|---|---|---|---|---|---|
| 1 | Ronnie Wilson | 28 | Liberty, South Carolina | "Pillowtalk" | ✔ | – | – | ✔ |
| 2 | Zoe Levert | 20 | New Orleans, Louisiana | "Better Man (Taylor's Version)" | ✔ | – | – | – |
| 3 | Ducote Talmage | 20 | Auburn, Alabama | "Sand in My Boots" | ✔ | ✔ | – | – |
| 4 | JJ Higgins | 46 | Nashville, Tennessee | "House at Pooh Corner" | – | – | – | – |
| 5 | Serenity Arce | 16 | Jupiter, Florida | "This City" | ✔ | ✘ | ✔ | ✔ |
| 6 | Emma Valentine | 20 | Santa Cruz, California | "Love Grows (Where My Rosemary Goes)" | – | – | – | – |
| 7 | Ryan Coleman | 25 | Chalfont, Pennsylvania | "Ain't No Sunshine" | – | ✔ | – | – |
| 8 | Zeya Rae | 23 | Stockton, California | "Bellyache" | – | – | – | ✔ |
| 9 | AJ Harvey | 25 | Wichita, Kansas | "Girl from the North Country" | – | ✔ | ✔ | – |
| 10 | Moelle (Morgan Hebert) | 29 | New Orleans, Louisiana | "Always Remember Us This Way" | – | – | – | – |
| 11 | Elyscia Jefferson | 20 | Baltimore, Maryland | "P.Y.T. (Pretty Young Thing)" | – | ✔ | ✔ | ✔ |

=== Episode 6 (March 12) ===
Sixth blind auditions results
| Order | Artist | Age | Hometown | Song | Coach's and artist's choices | | | |
| Order | Artist | Age | Hometown | Song | John | Dan + Shay | Chance | Reba |
|---|---|---|---|---|---|---|---|---|
| 1 | Val T. Webb (Valarie T. Smith) | 43 | Birmingham, Alabama | "Nobody's Supposed to Be Here" | ✔ | ✔ | ✔ | ✔ |
| 2 | JoeWun Bee | 27 | Largo, Florida | "Over My Head (Cable Car)" | – | – | Team full | – |
| 3 | Kyle Schuesler | 19 | Huntington Beach, California | "The Scientist" | ✔ | ✔ | Team full | ✔ |
| 4 | L. Rodgers (Lindsay Rodgers) | 34 | Baltimore, Maryland | "Wild Horses" | – | Team full | Team full | ✔ |
| 5 | Raina Chan | 14 | Stafford, Virginia | "Hold My Hand" | – | Team full | Team full | Team full |
| 6 | Olivia Rubini | 24 | Wilmington, Delaware | "Long, Long Time" | ✔ | Team full | Team full | Team full |

== Battles ==
The second stage of the show, the battles, aired from March 18 through March 26, 2024, consisting of episodes 7 through 10. In this round, the coaches pitted two of their artists in a singing match and then select one of them to advance to the next round. For the third consecutive season, there were no guest advisors for the battles, which meant the artists were mentored solely by their coaches.

Losing artists may be "stolen" by another coach, becoming new members of their team, or can receive a playoff pass from their coach, remaining a part of their original team and directly advancing to the playoffs. The four coaches are allowed to either offer a playoff pass or to steal a losing artist in a battle; however, if a coach uses their playoff pass, it overrides the steals.

At the end of this round, seven artists remained on each team; five were the battle winners, one was stolen from another coach; and one received a playoff pass. In total, 24 artists advanced to the knockouts, while four artists directly advanced to the playoffs.

Battles color key
| Artist won the battle and advanced to the knockouts |
| Artist who was stolen by another coach, and advanced to the knockouts |
| Artist who received a "playoff pass" from their coach, and advanced to playoffs |
| Artist lost the battle and was eliminated |

Battles results
| Episode | Coach | Order | Winner | Song | Loser | 'Steal'/'Pass' result | | | |
| Episode | Coach | Order | Winner | Song | Loser | John | Dan + Shay | Chance | Reba |
|---|---|---|---|---|---|---|---|---|---|
| Episode 7 (Monday, March 18, 2024) | John | 1 | Nathan Chester | "Rolling in the Deep" | Bryan Olesen | ✔ | ✔ | – | ✔ |
| Episode 7 (Monday, March 18, 2024) | Dan + Shay | 2 | Karen Waldrup | "Save Me the Trouble" | Ryan Argast | – | – | – | – |
| Episode 7 (Monday, March 18, 2024) | Reba | 3 | Tae Lewis | "We Don't Fight Anymore" | L. Rodgers | – | – | ✔ | ✔ |
| Episode 7 (Monday, March 18, 2024) | Chance | 4 | Kamalei Kawaʻa | "Over the Rainbow" | Gabriel Goes | – | – | – | – |
| Episode 7 (Monday, March 18, 2024) | John | 5 | Zoe Levert | "The Bones" | OK3 | N/A | – | – | – |
| Episode 7 (Monday, March 18, 2024) | Reba | 6 | Asher HaVon | "We Don't Need Another Hero" | Alyssa Crosby | – | – | ✔ | N/A |
| Episode 8 (Tuesday, March 19, 2024) | Dan + Shay | 1 | Frank Garcia | "Million Reasons" | Justin & Jeremy Garcia | – | – | N/A | ✔ |
| Episode 8 (Tuesday, March 19, 2024) | Reba | 2 | Zeya Rae | "Just Give Me a Reason" | William Alexander | – | – | N/A | Team full |
| Episode 8 (Tuesday, March 19, 2024) | Chance | 3 | Maddi Jane | "Can't Take My Eyes Off You" | Nadège | ✔ | ✔ | ✔ | Team full |
| Episode 9 (Monday, March 25, 2024) | Reba | 1 | Josh Sanders | "When It Rains It Pours" | Donny Van Slee | – | – | Team full | Team full |
| Episode 9 (Monday, March 25, 2024) | John | 2 | Gene Taylor | "When I Was Your Man" | Ronnie Wilson | N/A | – | Team full | Team full |
| Episode 9 (Monday, March 25, 2024) | Dan + Shay | 3 | Kyle Schuesler | "Lucky / Suerte" | Madison Curbelo | ✔ | ✔ | Team full | Team full |
| Episode 9 (Monday, March 25, 2024) | Chance | 4 | Serenity Arce | "Someone You Loved" | Bri Fletcher | – | – | Team full | Team full |
| Episode 9 (Monday, March 25, 2024) | Chance | 5 | Dani Stacy | "Best Part" | Corey Curtis | – | – | Team full | Team full |
| Episode 9 (Monday, March 25, 2024) | Dan + Shay | 6 | Ducote Talmage | "Rock and a Hard Place" | Ryan Coleman | – | N/A | Team full | Team full |
| Episode 9 (Monday, March 25, 2024) | John | 7 | Jackie Romeo | "Edge of Seventeen" | Olivia Rubini | N/A | ✔ | Team full | Team full |
| Episode 10 (Tuesday, March 26, 2024) | Reba | 1 | Ashley Bryant | "If I Were a Boy" | Elyscia Jefferson | – | Team full | Team full | Team full |
| Episode 10 (Tuesday, March 26, 2024) | John | 2 | Mafe | "You've Got a Friend" | Rivers Grayson | N/A | Team full | Team full | Team full |
| Episode 10 (Tuesday, March 26, 2024) | Dan + Shay | 3 | Anya True | "Half of My Heart" | AJ Harvey | – | Team full | Team full | Team full |
| Episode 10 (Tuesday, March 26, 2024) | Chance | 4 | RLetto | "Saving All My Love for You" | Val T. Webb | ✔ | Team full | Team full | Team full |
| Episode 11 (Monday, April 1, 2024) | | The eleventh episode was a special episode titled "Best of Blinds / Battles". It aired select blind auditions and battle performances from the season. | | | | | | | |

== Knockouts ==
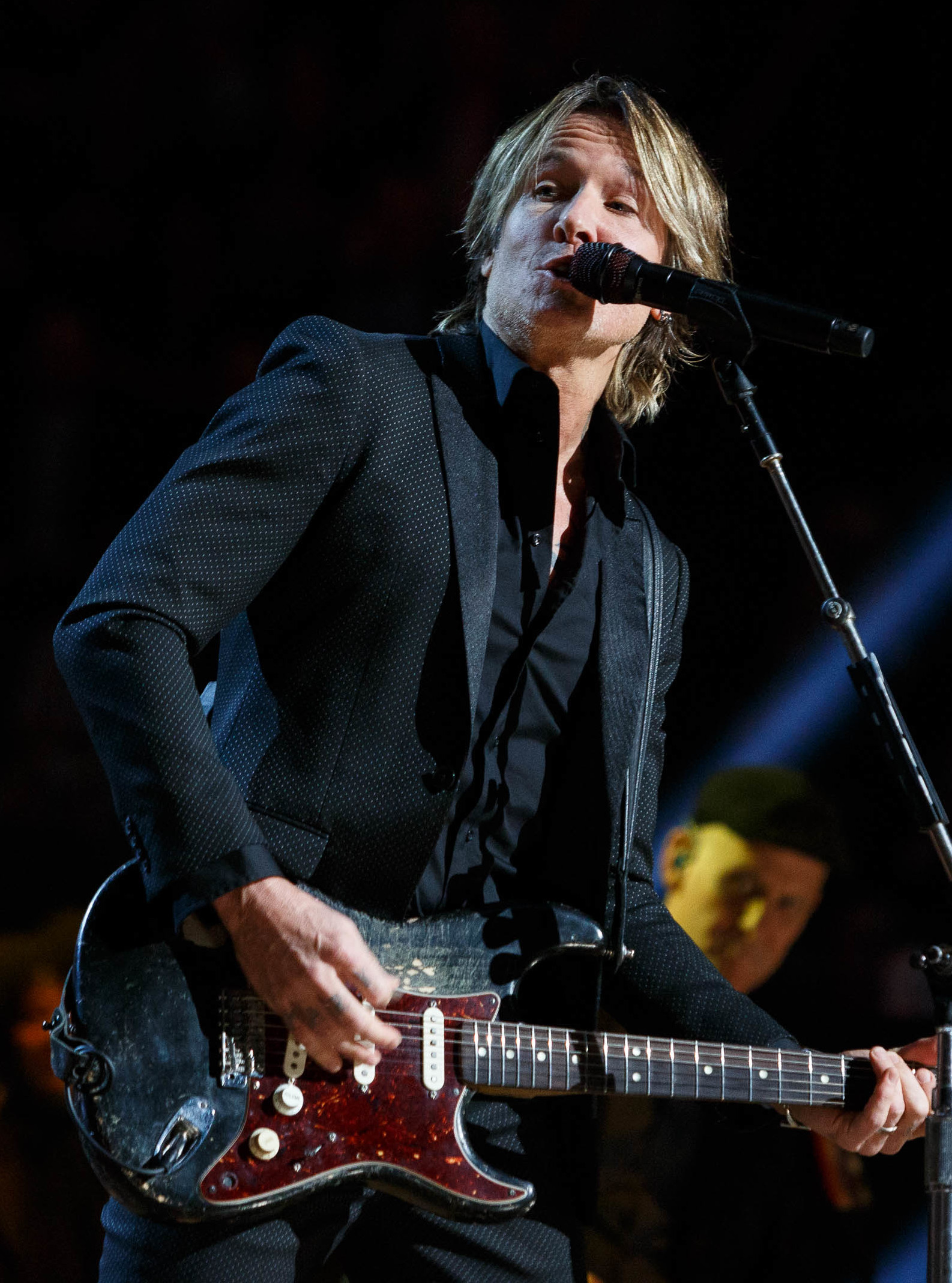
Keith Urban served as the mega mentor for the round.

The third stage of the show, the knockouts, aired from April 8 through April 15, consisting of episodes 12 and 13. Keith Urban served as the season's mega mentor for the round.

Each coach paired two of their artists in a singing match. The artists themselves select the song they sing in the round, and the coach then selects one of them to advance to the playoffs. Each coach can steal one losing artist from another team.

At the end of this round, twelve artists were knockout winners, while four artists were stolen, and four artists were recipients of the "playoff pass" from the battles, creating a total of twenty artists advancing to the playoffs.

Knockouts color key
| Artist won the knockout and advanced to the playoffs |
| Artist who was stolen by another coach, and advanced to the playoffs |
| Artist lost the knockout and was eliminated |

Knockouts results
| Episode | Coach | Order | Song | Artists | | Song | 'Steal' result | | | |
| Episode | Coach | Order | Song | Winner | Loser | Song | John | Dan + Shay | Chance | Reba |
|---|---|---|---|---|---|---|---|---|---|---|
| Episode 12 (Monday, April 8, 2024) | Reba | 1 | "Un-Break My Heart" | Asher HaVon | Tae Lewis | "Nothin' On You" | ✔ | ✔ | ✔ | N/A |
| Episode 12 (Monday, April 8, 2024) | Dan + Shay | 2 | "Tiny Dancer" | Olivia Rubini | Frank Garcia | "El Triste" | – | Team full | – | – |
| Episode 12 (Monday, April 8, 2024) | John | 3 | "Fooled Around and Fell in Love" | Nathan Chester | Val T. Webb | "Sweet Love" | N/A | Team full | – | – |
| Episode 12 (Monday, April 8, 2024) | Chance | 4 | "Unfaithful" | Serenity Arce | Dani Stacy | "Jaded" | – | Team full | N/A | – |
| Episode 12 (Monday, April 8, 2024) | Reba | 5 | "Wild as Her" | Josh Sanders | Ashley Bryant | "Heads Carolina, Tails California" | – | Team full | – | N/A |
| Episode 12 (Monday, April 8, 2024) | Dan + Shay | 6 | "Runaway" | Anya True | Kyle Schuesler | "Say You Won't Let Go" | – | Team full | ✔ | – |
| Episode 13 (Monday, April 15, 2024) | Chance | 1 | "New Rules" | Maddi Jane | Kamalei Kawaʻa | "All of Me" | ✔ | Team full | Team full | ✔ |
| Episode 13 (Monday, April 15, 2024) | John | 2 | "Almost is Never Enough" | Mafe | Gene Taylor | "I Don't Want to Miss a Thing" | Team full | Team full | Team full | – |
| Episode 13 (Monday, April 15, 2024) | Dan + Shay | 3 | "Georgia Rain" | Karen Waldrup | Ducote Talmage | "She Got the Best of Me" | Team full | Team full | Team full | – |
| Episode 13 (Monday, April 15, 2024) | Reba | 4 | "You Are the Reason" | Justin & Jeremy Garcia | Zeya Rae | "River" | Team full | Team full | Team full | N/A |
| Episode 13 (Monday, April 15, 2024) | Chance | 5 | "Stay" | RLetto | Alyssa Crosby | "I Guess That's Why They Call It the Blues" | Team full | Team full | Team full | – |
| Episode 13 (Monday, April 15, 2024) | John | 6 | "Cowboy Take Me Away" | Zoe Levert | Jackie Romeo | "Love on the Brain" | Team full | Team full | Team full | ✔ |

== Playoffs ==
The fourth stage of the show, the playoffs, aired from April 22 through April 29, consisting of episodes 14 and 15. The top 20 artists perform for the coaches with a song of their choosing. At the end of the round, each coach selects three of their artists to advance, creating a total of 12 artists advancing to the live shows.

Like season six, season 13, season 23, and the previous season, the playoffs were not contested live. They were prerecorded and taped at the same stage as the prior two rounds, hence the lack of an interactive viewer voting component or a subsequent results episode. Teams Legend and Dan + Shay performed on the first episode, while Teams Chance and Reba performed in the latter episode.

This round features guest mentors, dubbed "playoff advisors", for each team. The advisors are Maluma for Team Legend, Saweetie for Team Dan + Shay, Meghan Trainor for Team Chance, and Anthony Ramos for Team Reba.

Playoffs color key
| Artist was chosen by their coach to move on to the live shows |
| Artist was eliminated |

Playoffs results
| Episode | Coach | Order | Artist | Song | Result |
|---|---|---|---|---|---|
| Episode 14 (Monday, April 22, 2024) | John Legend | 1 | Nathan Chester | "Oh! Darling" | Advanced |
| Episode 14 (Monday, April 22, 2024) | Dan + Shay | 2 | Karen Waldrup | "Heart Like a Truck" | Advanced |
| Episode 14 (Monday, April 22, 2024) | John Legend | 3 | Kamalei Kawaʻa | "No Woman, No Cry" | Eliminated |
| Episode 14 (Monday, April 22, 2024) | Dan + Shay | 4 | Anya True | "All Too Well" | Eliminated |
| Episode 14 (Monday, April 22, 2024) | John Legend | 5 | Bryan Olesen | "Africa" | Advanced |
| Episode 14 (Monday, April 22, 2024) | Dan + Shay | 6 | Olivia Rubini | "I'll Stand by You" | Eliminated |
| Episode 14 (Monday, April 22, 2024) | John Legend | 7 | Mafe | "Someone like You" | Eliminated |
| Episode 14 (Monday, April 22, 2024) | Dan + Shay | 8 | Tae Lewis | "Runnin' Outta Moonlight" | Advanced |
| Episode 14 (Monday, April 22, 2024) | John Legend | 9 | Zoe Levert | "Iris" | Advanced |
| Episode 14 (Monday, April 22, 2024) | Dan + Shay | 10 | Madison Curbelo | "Landslide" | Advanced |
| Episode 15 (Monday, April 29, 2024) | Reba McEntire | 1 | Josh Sanders | "Black Water" | Advanced |
| Episode 15 (Monday, April 29, 2024) | Chance the Rapper | 2 | Nadège | "Clocks" | Advanced |
| Episode 15 (Monday, April 29, 2024) | Reba McEntire | 3 | Justin & Jeremy Garcia | "Castle on the Hill" | Eliminated |
| Episode 15 (Monday, April 29, 2024) | Chance the Rapper | 4 | Kyle Schuesler | "Something in the Orange" | Eliminated |
| Episode 15 (Monday, April 29, 2024) | Reba McEntire | 5 | Jackie Romeo | "The Story" | Eliminated |
| Episode 15 (Monday, April 29, 2024) | Chance the Rapper | 6 | Serenity Arce | "Lose You to Love Me" | Advanced |
| Episode 15 (Monday, April 29, 2024) | Reba McEntire | 7 | L. Rodgers | "All I Know So Far" | Advanced |
| Episode 15 (Monday, April 29, 2024) | Chance the Rapper | 8 | RLetto | "Holy" | Eliminated |
| Episode 15 (Monday, April 29, 2024) | Reba McEntire | 9 | Asher HaVon | "Titanium" | Advanced |
| Episode 15 (Monday, April 29, 2024) | Chance the Rapper | 10 | Maddi Jane | "Stay" | Advanced |

== Live shows ==
Live shows color key
| Artist was saved by public's vote |
| Artist was placed in the bottom group and competed for an Instant Save |
| Artist was instantly saved |
| Artist was eliminated |

=== Week 1: Top 12 – Quarterfinals (May 6–7) ===
The Top 12 performances comprised episodes 16 and 17. The Top 12 artists, three from each team, performed on Monday, with the results following on Tuesday. The top eight artists were saved by the public's vote, while the remaining four artists, who received the fewest votes, competed for the Instant Save in the results show.

With all three members of Team Dan + Shay advancing, Dan + Shay became the second new coach to take three artists from their team to the Semifinals, after Reba McEntire in the previous season.

Top 12 results
| Episode | Coach | Order | Artist | Song | Result |
|---|---|---|---|---|---|
| Episode 16 (Monday, May 6, 2024) | John Legend | 1 | Bryan Olesen | "Don't Stop Me Now" | Public's vote |
| Episode 16 (Monday, May 6, 2024) | Dan + Shay | 2 | Tae Lewis | "19 You + Me" | Bottom four |
| Episode 16 (Monday, May 6, 2024) | Chance the Rapper | 3 | Maddi Jane | "Happier Than Ever" | Public's vote |
| Episode 16 (Monday, May 6, 2024) | Reba McEntire | 4 | L. Rodgers | "Up to the Mountain (MLK Song)" | Bottom four |
| Episode 16 (Monday, May 6, 2024) | Dan + Shay | 5 | Madison Curbelo | "Yesterday" | Public's vote |
| Episode 16 (Monday, May 6, 2024) | Reba McEntire | 6 | Asher HaVon | "I'll Make Love to You" | Public's vote |
| Episode 16 (Monday, May 6, 2024) | John Legend | 7 | Zoe Levert | "Stick Season" | Bottom four |
| Episode 16 (Monday, May 6, 2024) | Dan + Shay | 8 | Karen Waldrup | "I Hope You Dance" | Public's vote |
| Episode 16 (Monday, May 6, 2024) | Chance the Rapper | 9 | Serenity Arce | "Traitor" | Public's vote |
| Episode 16 (Monday, May 6, 2024) | Chance the Rapper | 10 | Nadège | "He Loves Me (Lyzel in E Flat)" | Bottom four |
| Episode 16 (Monday, May 6, 2024) | Reba McEntire | 11 | Josh Sanders | "Angels (Don't Always Have Wings)" | Public's vote |
| Episode 16 (Monday, May 6, 2024) | John Legend | 12 | Nathan Chester | "(Your Love Keeps Lifting Me) Higher and Higher" | Public's vote |
| Episode 17 (Tuesday, May 7, 2024) | Reba McEntire | 1 | L. Rodgers | "Don't Let the Sun Go Down on Me" | Eliminated |
| Episode 17 (Tuesday, May 7, 2024) | Chance the Rapper | 2 | Nadège | "Smooth Operator" | Eliminated |
| Episode 17 (Tuesday, May 7, 2024) | John Legend | 3 | Zoe Levert | "Slow Burn" | Eliminated |
| Episode 17 (Tuesday, May 7, 2024) | Dan + Shay | 4 | Tae Lewis | "The Church on Cumberland Road" | Instantly saved |

Non-competition performances
| Order | Performers | Song |
|---|---|---|
| 17.1 | Reba McEntire | "I Can't" |
| 17.2 | John Legend | "Ordinary People" |

=== Week 2: Top 9 – Semifinals (May 13–14) ===
This week's theme was “Hometown Week.” The semifinals comprised episodes 18 and 19. The nine semifinalists each performed a solo song and a trio performance with two fellow semifinalists on Monday, with the results following on Tuesday. The four artists with the most votes automatically moved on to the finale, while the remaining five artists competed in the Instant Save for the fifth and final spot in the finale.

With the eliminations of Serenity Arce and Maddi Jane, Chance the Rapper no longer has any artists on his team. Additionally, with the advancements of Nathan Chester and Bryan Olesen, John Legend successfully brought two artists to the finale for the first time in his nine seasons as a coach. With the advancement of Karen Waldrup to the finale, Dan + Shay became the tenth new coach to successfully bring their team to the finale, the first being Usher (Michelle Chamuel in season 4), the second being Alicia Keys (Wé McDonald in season 11), the third being Kelly Clarkson (Brynn Cartelli in season 14), the fourth being John Legend (Maelyn Jarmon in season 16), the fifth being Nick Jonas (Thunderstorm Artis in season 18), the sixth being Camila Cabello (Morgan Myles in season 22), the seventh Chance the Rapper (Sorelle in season 23), the eighth Niall Horan (Gina Miles also in season 23), and the ninth Reba McEntire (Ruby Leigh and Jacquie Roar in season 24). This also marks the third time that multiple coaches have multiple artists competing in the finale, with McEntire and Legend both having two artists each, following season 21 and the previous season.

Furthermore, this is the first (and only season to date) not to have any 4-chair turn finalists.

Semifinals results
| Episode | Coach | Order | Artist | Song | Trio | Result |
|---|---|---|---|---|---|---|
| Episode 18 (Monday, May 13, 2024) | Reba McEntire | 1 (5) | Josh Sanders | "White Horse" | "Forever Young" | Public's vote |
| Episode 18 (Monday, May 13, 2024) | Dan + Shay | 2 (8) | Madison Curbelo | "Time After Time" | "Fix You" | Bottom five |
| Episode 18 (Monday, May 13, 2024) | Chance the Rapper | 4 (8) | Serenity Arce | "We Can't Be Friends (Wait for Your Love)" | "Fix You" | Bottom five |
| Episode 18 (Monday, May 13, 2024) | Chance the Rapper | 6 (3) | Maddi Jane | "Greedy" | "Just like Heaven" | Bottom five |
| Episode 18 (Monday, May 13, 2024) | John Legend | 7 (3) | Nathan Chester | "Try a Little Tenderness" | "Just like Heaven" | Public's vote |
| Episode 18 (Monday, May 13, 2024) | John Legend | 9 (3) | Bryan Olesen | "Against All Odds" | "Just like Heaven" | Bottom five |
| Episode 18 (Monday, May 13, 2024) | Dan + Shay | 10 (5) | Karen Waldrup | "Stay" | "Forever Young" | Public's vote |
| Episode 18 (Monday, May 13, 2024) | Reba McEntire | 11 (8) | Asher HaVon | "Irreplaceable" | "Fix You" | Public's vote |
| Episode 18 (Monday, May 13, 2024) | Dan + Shay | 12 (5) | Tae Lewis | "Amazed" | "Forever Young" | Bottom five |
| Episode 19 (Tuesday, May 14, 2024) | Chance the Rapper | 1 | Serenity Arce | "Because of You" | | Eliminated |
| Episode 19 (Tuesday, May 14, 2024) | Dan + Shay | 2 | Tae Lewis | "Wanted" | | Eliminated |
| Episode 19 (Tuesday, May 14, 2024) | John Legend | 3 | Bryan Olesen | "Viva la Vida" | | Instantly saved |
| Episode 19 (Tuesday, May 14, 2024) | Dan + Shay | 4 | Madison Curbelo | "Man in the Mirror" | | Eliminated |
| Episode 19 (Tuesday, May 14, 2024) | Chance the Rapper | 5 | Maddi Jane | "I'll Never Love Again" | | Eliminated |

Non-competition performances
| Order | Performers | Song |
|---|---|---|
| 19.1 | Chance the Rapper | "Together" |
| 19.2 | Anitta | "Ahí" / "Lose Ya Breath" |

=== Week 3: Finale (May 20–21) ===
The season finale ran through two nights, Monday and Tuesday, May 20 through 21, 2024, comprising episodes 20 and 21. The Top 5 performed on Monday, with each artist performing an up-tempo song and a ballad for the title of The Voice. At the episode's conclusion, the overnight voting for the season's winner began. The following night, on Tuesday, the finalists performed a duet with their respective coaches before the results of the public vote were announced, and the winner of the season was named.

Asher HaVon was named as the winner on the season finale aired on May 21, 2024. His victory marks Reba McEntire's first win as a coach, with McEntire becoming the fifth female coach to win a season, after Christina Aguilera, Alicia Keys, Kelly Clarkson, and Gwen Stefani, as well as the oldest coach ever to win the competition, at sixty-nine years of age. McEntire also became the second coach in the history of the show, after Blake Shelton, to have the winner and runner-up on her team, as well as the first female coach to ever have the distinction.

Finale results
| Coach | Artist | Episode 20 (Monday, May 20, 2024) | | | | Episode 21 (Tuesday, May 21, 2024) | | Result |
| Coach | Artist | Order | Up-tempo song | Order | Ballad | Order | Duet (with coach) | Result |
|---|---|---|---|---|---|---|---|---|
| John Legend | Nathan Chester | 1 | "It's Your Thing" | 7 | "A Song for You" | 15 | "When a Man Loves a Woman" | Fourth place |
| Reba McEntire | Josh Sanders | 6 | "Boots On" | 2 | "Go Rest High on That Mountain" | 13 | "Back to God" | Runner-up |
| Reba McEntire | Asher HaVon | 3 | "Last Dance" | 10 | "I Will Always Love You" | 14 | "On My Own" | Winner |
| John Legend | Bryan Olesen | 8 | "Freedom! '90" | 4 | "Beautiful Things" | 12 | "Feeling Good" | Third place |
| Dan + Shay | Karen Waldrup | 9 | "I'm Alright" | 5 | "What Hurts the Most" | 11 | "You Look Good" | Fifth place |

Non-competition performances
| Order | Performers | Song |
|---|---|---|
| 20.1 | Keith Urban | "Messed Up as Me" |
| 20.2 | U.S. Army Field Band | "Brother" |
| 21.1 | Thomas Rhett | "Beautiful as You" |
| 21.2 | Muni Long | "Made for Me" |
| 21.3 | The Black Keys | "Beautiful People (Stay High)" |
| 21.4 | Lainey Wilson | "Hang Tight Honey" |
| 21.5 | Kate Hudson | "Glorious" |
| 21.6 | Gina Miles | "Wicked Game" |
| 21.7 | Jelly Roll | "I Am Not Okay" |

== Elimination chart ==
Results color key
| Winner | Fifth place |
| Runner-up | Saved by the public |
| Third place | Saved by an instant save (via Voice App) |
| Fourth place | Eliminated |

Coaches color key
| Team Legend |
| Team Dan + Shay |
| Team Chance |
| Team Reba |

=== Overall ===
Live shows' results per week
| Artists | Week 1 — Top 12 | Week 2 — Top 9 | Week 3 — Finale |
|---|---|---|---|
| Asher HaVon | Safe | Safe | Winner |
| Josh Sanders | Safe | Safe | Runner-up |
| Bryan Olesen | Safe | Safe | Third place |
| Nathan Chester | Safe | Safe | Fourth place |
| Karen Waldrup | Safe | Safe | Fifth place |
| Maddi Jane | Safe | Eliminated | Eliminated (Week 2) |
| Madison Curbelo | Safe | Eliminated | Eliminated (Week 2) |
| Serenity Arce | Safe | Eliminated | Eliminated (Week 2) |
| Tae Lewis | Safe | Eliminated | Eliminated (Week 2) |
| L. Rodgers | Eliminated | Eliminated (Week 1) | |
| Nadège | Eliminated | Eliminated (Week 1) | |
| Zoe Levert | Eliminated | Eliminated (Week 1) | |

=== Per team ===
Live shows' results per team
| Artists | Week 1 — Top 12 | Week 2 — Top 9 | Week 3 — Finale |
|---|---|---|---|
| Bryan Olesen | Advanced | Advanced | Third place |
| Nathan Chester | Advanced | Advanced | Fourth place |
| Zoe Levert | Eliminated | | |
| Karen Waldrup | Advanced | Advanced | Fifth place |
| Madison Curbelo | Advanced | Eliminated | |
| Tae Lewis | Advanced | Eliminated | |
| Serenity Arce | Advanced | Eliminated | |
| Maddi Jane | Advanced | Eliminated | |
| Nadège | Eliminated | | |
| Asher HaVon | Advanced | Advanced | Winner |
| Josh Sanders | Advanced | Advanced | Runner-up |
| L. Rodgers | Eliminated | | |

== Ratings ==
Viewership and ratings per episode of The Voice season 25
| No. | Title | Air date | Timeslot (ET) | Rating (18–49) | Viewers (millions) |
|---|---|---|---|---|---|
| 1 | "The Blind Auditions, Season Premiere" | February 26, 2024 | Monday 8:00 p.m. | 0.5 | 6.33 |
| 2 | "The Blind Auditions, Part 2" | February 27, 2024 | Tuesday 8:00 p.m. | 0.4 | 5.28 |
| 3 | "The Blind Auditions, Part 3" | March 4, 2024 | Monday 8:00 p.m. | 0.5 | 5.83 |
| 4 | "The Blind Auditions, Part 4" | March 5, 2024 | Tuesday 9:00 p.m. | 0.3 | 3.95 |
| 5 | "The Blind Auditions, Part 5" | March 11, 2024 | Monday 8:00 p.m. | 0.5 | 6.11 |
| 6 | "The Blind Auditions, Part 6" | March 12, 2024 | Tuesday 9:00 p.m. | 0.4 | 4.42 |
| 7 | "The Battles Premiere" | March 18, 2024 | Monday 8:00 p.m. | 0.5 | 6.23 |
| 8 | "The Battles Part 2" | March 19, 2024 | Tuesday 9:00 p.m. | 0.3 | 4.36 |
| 9 | "The Battles Part 3" | March 25, 2024 | Monday 8:00 p.m. | 0.4 | 5.34 |
| 10 | "The Battles Part 4" | March 26, 2024 | Tuesday 9:00 p.m. | 0.4 | 4.32 |
| 11 | "Best of Blinds / Battles" | April 1, 2024 | Monday 8:00 p.m. | 0.3 | 3.17 |
| 12 | "The Knockouts Premiere" | April 8, 2024 | Monday 8:00 p.m. | 0.4 | 5.03 |
| 13 | "The Knockouts Part 2" | April 15, 2024 | Monday 8:00 p.m. | 0.4 | 4.77 |
| 14 | "Playoffs Premiere" | April 22, 2024 | Monday 8:00 p.m. | 0.4 | 4.77 |
| 15 | "Playoffs Part 2" | April 29, 2024 | Monday 8:00 p.m. | 0.3 | 4.64 |
| 16 | "Live Top 12/ Quarterfinals Performances" | May 6, 2024 | Monday 8:00 p.m. | 0.4 | 5.27 |
| 17 | "Live Top 12/ Quarterfinals Results" | May 7, 2024 | Tuesday 8:00 p.m. | 0.3 | 4.43 |
| 18 | "Live Semi-Final Performances" | May 13, 2024 | Monday 8:00 p.m. | 0.4 | 5.07 |
| 19 | "Live Semi-Final Results" | May 14, 2024 | Tuesday 8:00 p.m. | 0.4 | 4.70 |
| 20 | "Live Finale, Part 1" | May 20, 2024 | Monday 8:00 p.m. | 0.4 | 5.57 |
| 21 | "Live Finale, Part 2" | May 21, 2024 | Tuesday 9:00 p.m. | 0.4 | 5.11 |
