= Bryan Olesen =

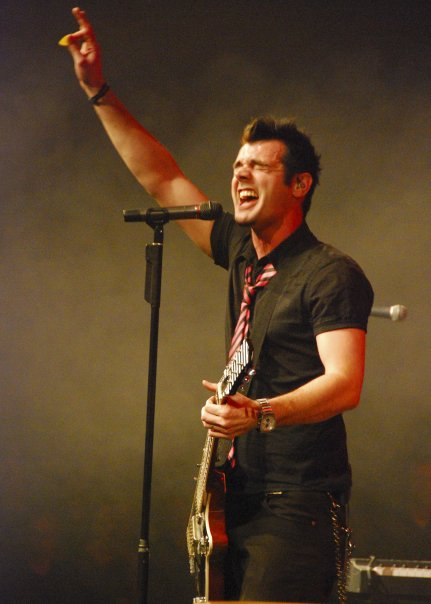
- Olesen performing with VOTA in Lincoln, Nebraska

Background information
- Born: Bryan David Olesen; November 1, 1973 (age 52)
- Origin: Hartford, Connecticut
- Occupations: Musician, singer-songwriter
- Instruments: Vocals, guitar

Bryan Olesen is a Christian rock guitarist, vocalist, and songwriter.

== Biography ==
Bryan David Olesen was born on November 1, 1973 in Hartford, Connecticut, to John and Norine Olesen. He married Jennifer Hines on August 23, 1997 and they have three children.

Olesen was in the Christian bands Newsboys and VOTA. He filled in on lead guitar while Jody Davis (of the Newsboys) was caring for Davis' daughter during an illness. Olesen is featured on the Newsboys album "Devotion" 2004.

He is one of the founding members of the group VOTA, previously known as Casting Pearls, a Christian rock band, along with Case Maranville. Olesen has been the lead singer and guitarist of VOTA since it began in the late 1990s. He was officially announced as Davis' replacement in February 2004, and was the lead guitarist and background vocalist in the group until January 2006, when he left the band to focus on his other band, VOTA (then known as Casting Pearls). In 2024, Olesen competed on the 25th season of The Voice as part of John Legend's team. Olesen made it to the finale and finished in third place. One year later, his daughter, Jadyn Cree, competed on the 27th season of The Voice as part of Michael Bublé's team. Cree made it to the finale and finished in fifth place.

Performances on The Voice season 25
Round	Theme	Song	Original artist	Order	Original air date	Result
Blind Auditions	—N/a	"Love Runs Out"	OneRepublic	3.6	March 4, 2024	Dan + Shay, John Legend, and Reba McEntire turned; joined Team John Legend
Battles (Top 40)	—N/a	"Rolling in the Deep" (vs. Nathan Chester)	Adele	7.1	March 18, 2024	Received a playoff pass from his coach John Legend and advanced to the playoffs
Playoffs (Top 20)	—N/a	"Africa"	Toto	14.5	April 29, 2024	Saved by John Legend
Live Quarterfinals (Top 12)	—N/a	"Don't Stop Me Now"	Queen	16.1	May 6, 2024	Saved by vote
Live Semi-finals (Top 9)	—N/a	"Against All Odds (Take a Look at Me Now)"	Phil Collins	18.9	May 13, 2024	Bottom five
Live Semi-finals (Top 9)	—N/a	"Viva la Vida"	Coldplay	19.3	May 14, 2024	Saved by Instant save
Live Finale (Final 5)	"Uptempo Song"	"Freedom! '90"	George Michael	20.8	May 20, 2024	3rd Place
Live Finale (Final 5)	"Ballad"	"Beautiful Things"	Benson Boone	20.4	May 20, 2024	3rd Place
Live Finale (Final 5)	"Duet with Coach"	"Feeling Good" Duet with John Legend	Joe Bonamassa	21.12	May 21, 2024	3rd Place
