= Asher HaVon =

- Born: October 17, 1991 (age 34); Selma, Alabama, U.S.
- Genres: R&B; Soul
- Occupation: Singer
- Instrument: Vocals
- Years active: 2018–present
- Label: Republic
- Website: asherhavon.org

Asher HaVon (born October 17, 1991) is an American soul singer. He is the winner of season 25 of the American talent competition The Voice. He was the first openly LGBTQ person to win. He competed on the team coached by Reba McEntire, giving McEntire her first win as a coach on the show.

== Life and career ==
Asher HaVon is originally from Selma, Alabama and lives there. He gained an interest in singing through church choir. In 2015, then-President of the United States Barack Obama visited Selma to commemorate the 50th anniversary of Bloody Sunday on the Edmund Pettus Bridge. The choir, led by HaVon, performed "Glory" for Obama during his visit.

=== 2018: "Free" ===
In 2018, HaVon independently released his first single, "Free", which is inspired by his gospel roots.

=== 2024–present: The Voice ===
Performances on The Voice season 25
| Round | Theme | Song | Original artist | Order | Original air date | Result |
|---|---|---|---|---|---|---|
| Blind Auditions | —N/a | "Set Fire to the Rain" | Adele | 3.6 | March 4, 2024 | Dan + Shay, Chance the Rapper, and Reba McEntire turned; joined Team Reba |
| Battles (Top 40) | —N/a | "We Don't Need Another Hero" (vs. Alyssa Crosby) | Tina Turner | 7.6 | March 18, 2024 | Saved by Reba |
| Knockouts (Top 28) | —N/a | "Un-Break My Heart" (vs. Tae Lewis) | Toni Braxton | 12.1 | April 8, 2024 | Saved by Reba |
| Playoffs (Top 20) | —N/a | "Titanium" | David Guetta featuring Sia | 15.9 | April 29, 2024 | Saved by Reba |
| Live Quarterfinals (Top 12) | —N/a | "I'll Make Love to You" | Boyz II Men | 16.6 | May 6, 2024 | Saved by Public |
| Live Semi-finals (Top 9) | —N/a | "Irreplaceable" | Beyoncé | 18.11 | May 13, 2024 | Saved by Public |
| Live Finale (Final 5) | "Uptempo Song" | "Last Dance" | Donna Summer | 20.3 | May 20, 2024 | Winner |
| Live Finale (Final 5) | "Ballad" | "I Will Always Love You" | Whitney Houston | 20.10 | May 20, 2024 | Winner |
| Live Finale (Final 5) | "Duet with Coach" | "On My Own" (Duet with Reba McEntire) | Patti LaBelle and Michael McDonald | 21.14 | May 21, 2024 | Winner |

In 2024, HaVon competed in the 25th season of The Voice. In the blind auditions, he sang "Set Fire to the Rain" by Adele. Three of the season's four coaches, Dan + Shay, Chance the Rapper, and Reba McEntire turned their chairs for him; only John Legend refrained. He chose to join Team Reba. HaVon won the season on May 21, 2024, giving his coach Reba McEntire her first win. Ultimately, HaVon won US$100,000 and a record deal with Republic Records, a label owned by Universal Music Group.

On May 28, 2024, HaVon appeared on The Kelly Clarkson Show, discussing his time on The Voice and the advice he received from coach Reba McEntire. On Dec. 10, 2024, HaVon returned to The Voice for the season 26 finale to perform "Thank You", his first single after winning the show, which was dedicated to his coach McEntire.

== Artistry and style ==
HaVon's artistry has largely been attached to Soul and R&B. HaVon is known for his flamboyant clothing on stage, which his The Voice coach McEntire described as "regal," as well as wearing a wig for many of his performances.

== Discography ==
=== Singles ===
List of singles, showing year released and the name of the album
| Title | Year | Peak chart positions | Album |
| Title | Year | US | Album |
|---|---|---|---|
| "Free" | 2018 | — | Non-album single |
| "Thank You" | 2024 | — | Non-album single |
"—" denotes a recording that did not chart or was not released in that territory

Awards and achievements
| Preceded by Huntley | The Voice (American); Winner; 2024 (Spring) | Succeeded by Sofronio Vasquez |
| Preceded by "Higher" | The Voice (American); Winner's song "Last Dance"; 2024 (Spring) | Succeeded by "Unstoppable" |
