= The Voice (American TV series) season 26 =

The Voice
- Season 26
- Promotional poster featuring coaches Snoop Dogg, Stefani, McEntire, and Bublé
- Hosted by: Carson Daly
- Coaches: Michael Bublé; Gwen Stefani; Reba McEntire; Snoop Dogg
- No. of contestants: 56 artists
- Winner: Sofronio Vasquez
- Winning coach: Michael Bublé
- Runner-up: Shye
- No. of episodes: 22

Release
- Original network: NBC
- Original release: September 23 – December 10, 2024

Season chronology
- ← Previous; Season 25 Next → Season 27

The twenty-sixth season of the American reality television series The Voice premiered on September 23, 2024, on NBC. The season is hosted by Carson Daly, who returns for his twenty-sixth season. The coaching panel consists of Reba McEntire, who returns for her third season; returning coach Gwen Stefani, who returns for her eighth season after a one-season hiatus; and debuting coaches Michael Bublé and Snoop Dogg.

Sofronio Vasquez was named the winner of the season, marking Michael Bublé's first win as a coach (with Bublé becoming the fourth new coach) after Kelly Clarkson, John Legend, and Niall Horan to win on his debut season.

With Vasquez's win and Shye's runner-up finish, Bublé became the first coach in the history of the show to have the top two artists on his team on his debut season. Additionally, Vasquez became the first foreign male winner (and second winner of Asian descent to win) following Tessanne Chin in the fifth season.

This was the fifth (and second consecutive) season in the history of the show that a coach (Bublé) had the top two artists on their team, following Blake Shelton in seasons 3, 18, and 22, and Reba McEntire in the previous season.

== Overview ==
=== Development ===
On May 10, 2024, NBC announced that The Voice was renewed for a twenty-sixth season to air in the fall of that year. On May 13, the lineup of coaches was unveiled at the network's upfront presentation for the 2024–25 United States network television schedule at Radio City Music Hall in New York City.

=== Coaches and host ===
Coaches and Host of The Voice Season 26

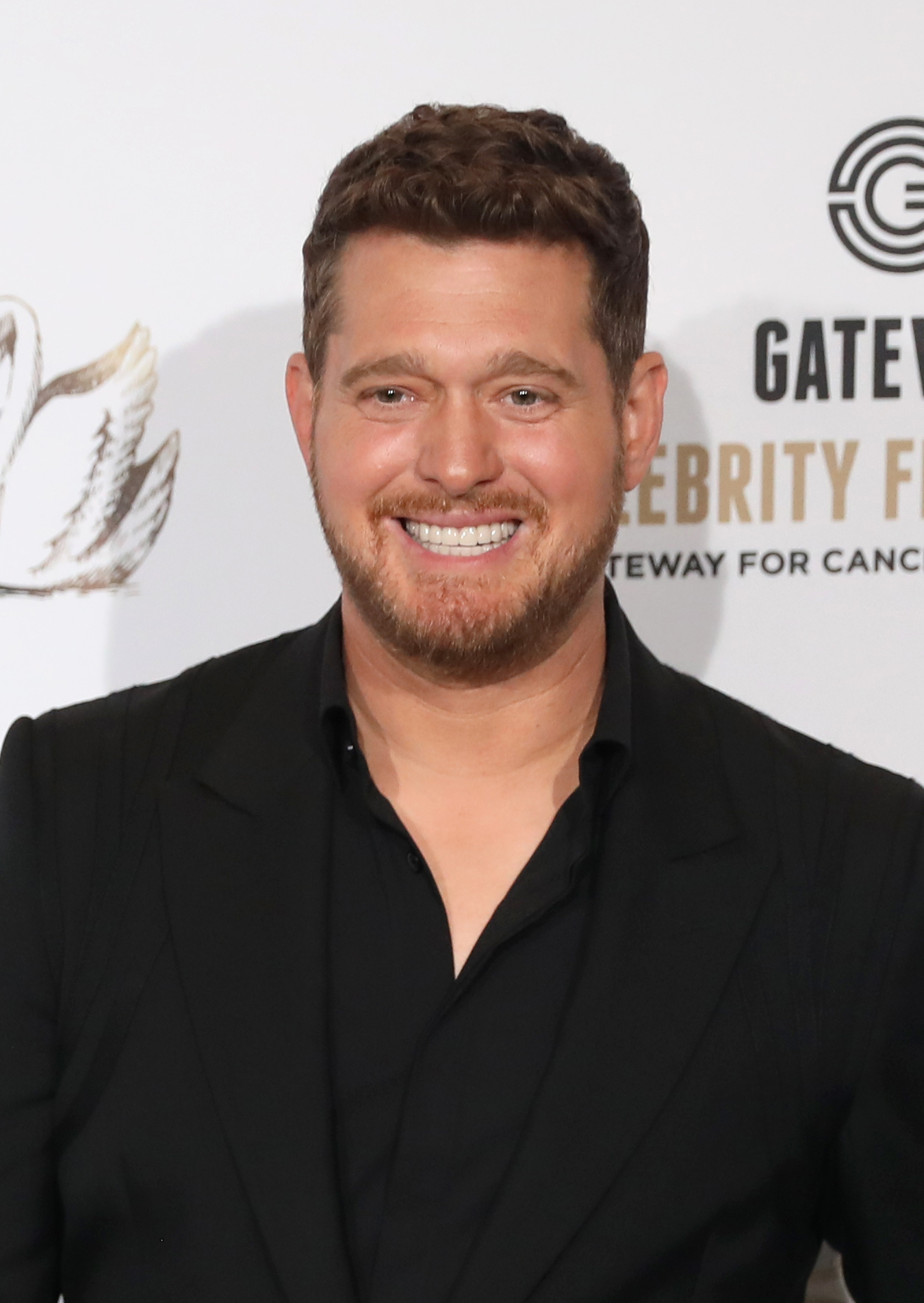
Michael Bublé

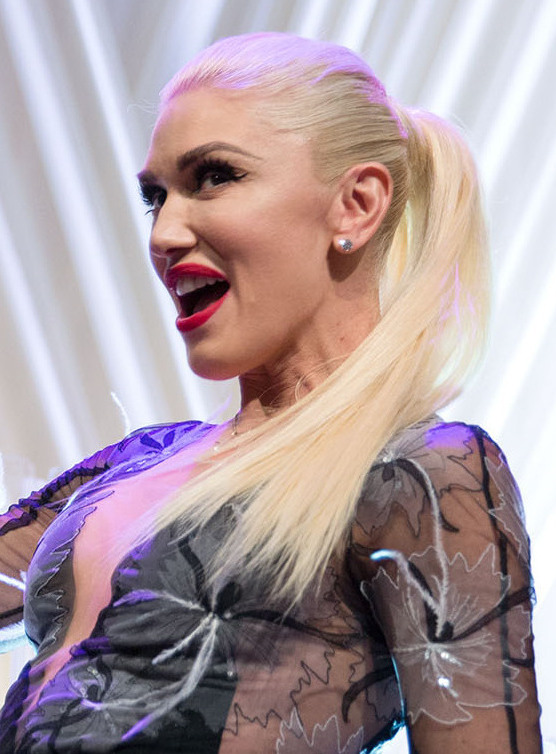
Gwen Stefani

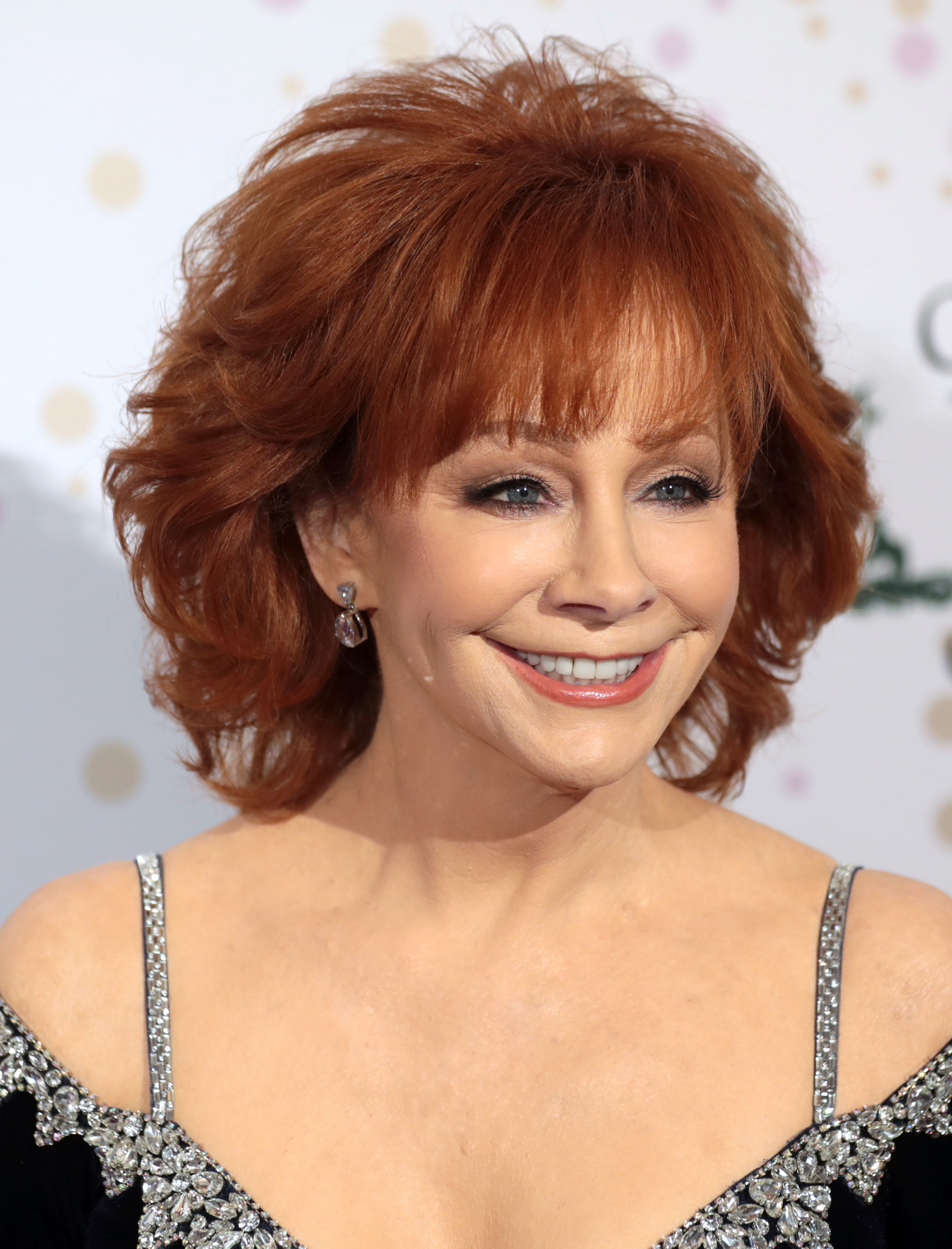
Reba McEntire

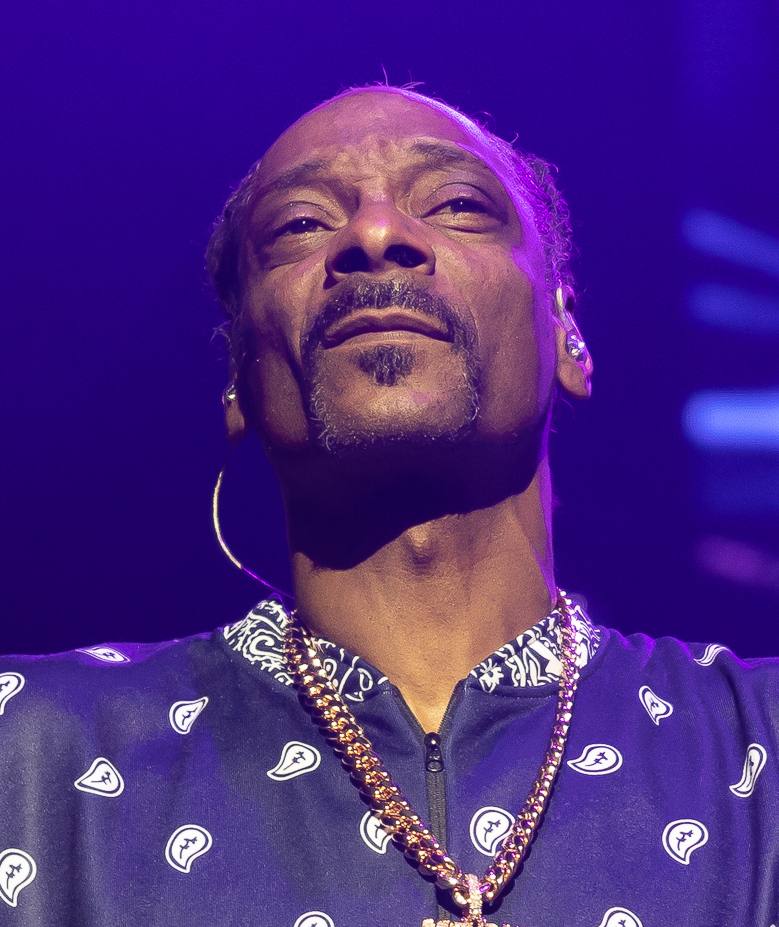
Snoop Dogg

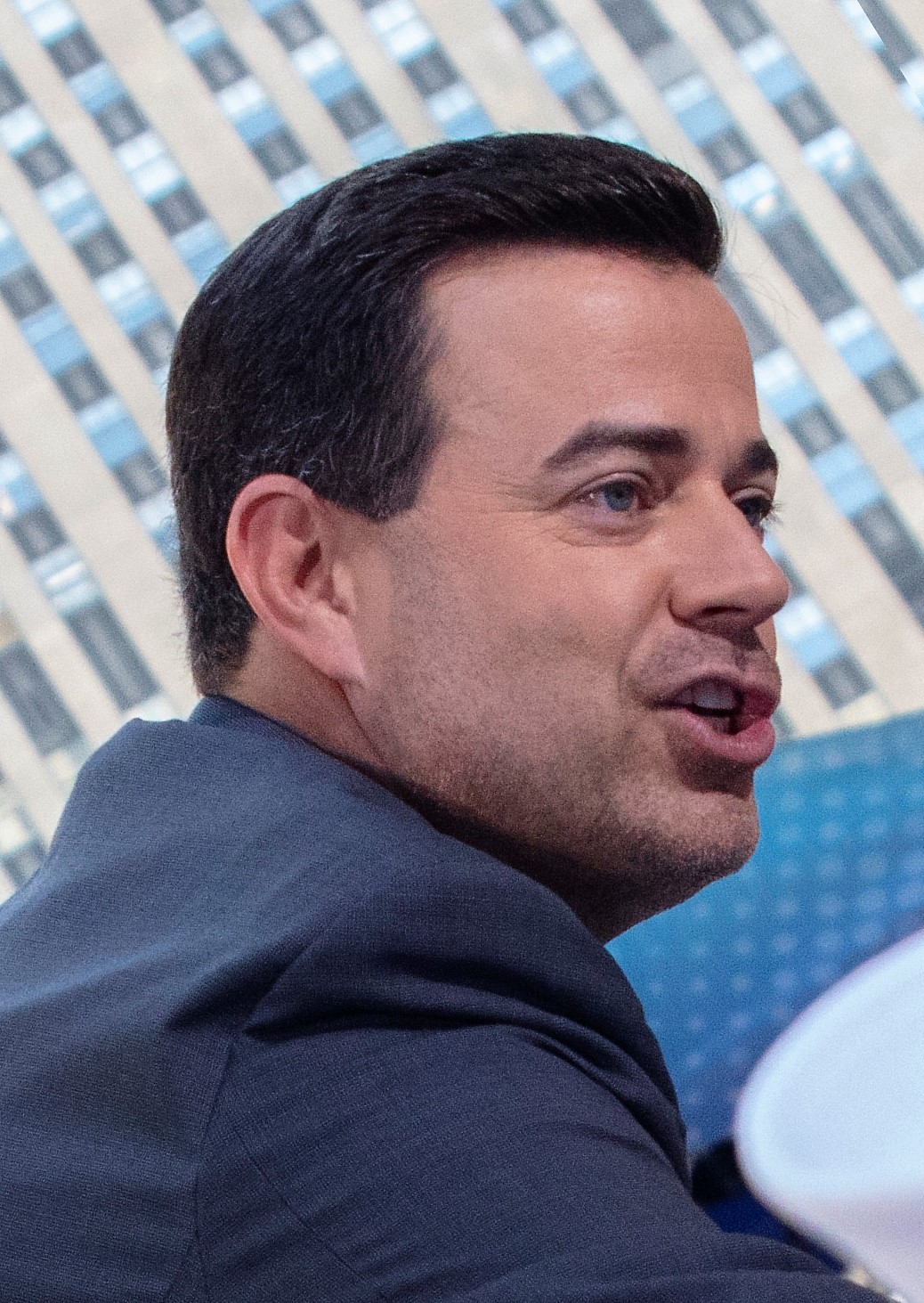
Carson Daly

Of the four coaches that participated in the previous season, only Reba McEntire returned, marking her third season as a coach. Coaches Chance the Rapper, Dan + Shay, and John Legend all departed the panel for the season. The latter two coaches both cited their ongoing concert tours as reasons for their departure.

Former coach Gwen Stefani returns to the show following her absence in the previous season, marking her eighth season as a coach. Canadian singer-songwriter Michael Bublé and rapper Snoop Dogg join the coaching panel for their first seasons, marking the first time since season 23 in which two coaches were introduced in a season. Both new coaches previously appeared on the show: Bublé previously served as a battle advisor for Team Blake on season 3, while Snoop Dogg served as a mega mentor on season 20 during the Knockouts. With Bublé's debut, he becomes the first Canadian to serve as a coach on the American adaptation of The Voice.

Carson Daly returns for his twenty-sixth season as host.

=== Mega mentors ===
On November 4, 2024, it was announced that former coach Jennifer Hudson would serve as a mega mentor for the Knockouts alongside English musician Sting. Hudson mentored Teams Bublé and Reba, while Sting was paired with Teams Gwen and Snoop. This marks the first season to feature two mega mentors in the Knockouts. For the fourth consecutive season, there were no guest advisors in the battles, meaning the artists were solely mentored by their coaches.

=== Marketing and promotion ===
Ahead of the season's premiere, on July 26, the show, via its online media platforms, released a cover of the 1966 Four Tops single "Reach Out I'll Be There" performed by the coaches. On September 23, hours before the premiere, the show released a cover of the coaches performing the 1979 Eagles hit, "Heartache Tonight".

Shortly prior to the season premiere, the blind audition of Sofronio Vasquez, performing Mary J. Blige's "I'm Goin' Down", was released online.

== Teams ==
Teams color key
Winner	Eliminated in the Playoffs
Runner-up	Stolen in the Knockouts
Third place	Eliminated in the Knockouts
Fourth place	Stolen in the Battles
Fifth place	Eliminated in the Battles
Eliminated in the Live Semifinals	Contestant withdrew

Coaches' teams
Coach	Top 56 Artists				
Michael Bublé					
Michael Bublé	Sofronio Vasquez	Shye	Jaukeem Fortson	Sloane Simon	Cameron Wright
Michael Bublé	~~Jeremy Beloate~~	~~Edward Preble~~	J.Paul	Kiara Vega	Tanner Frick
Michael Bublé	~~Mor Ilderton~~	~~Cassidy Lee~~	~~Aliyah Khaylyn~~	Kamila Kiehne	Jamison Puckett
Michael Bublé	Torion Sellers	**Mark Shiiba**			
Gwen Stefani					
Gwen Stefani	Sydney Sterlace	Jan Dan	Jose Luis	Jake Tankersley	Gabrielle Zabosky
Gwen Stefani	Camryn Brooks	Felsmere	Deon Jones	Kay Sibal	Mor Ilderton
Gwen Stefani	~~Sloane Simon~~	~~Austyns Stancil~~	~~Frankie Torres~~	BEYA	**Jaylen Dunham**
Gwen Stefani	Cozy Len	Rowdy Shea			
Reba McEntire					
Reba McEntire	Danny Joseph	Adam Bohanan	Katie O.	Edward Preble	Lauren-Michael Sellers
Reba McEntire	~~Jaukeem Fortson~~	**Kendall Eugene**	Cassidy Lee	Tate Renner	Frankie Torres
Reba McEntire	~~Tanner Frick~~	~~Deon Jones~~	323	Alison Elena	Kevin James Graham
Reba McEntire	Creigh Riepe	Tsola			
Snoop Dogg					
Snoop Dogg	Jeremy Beloate	Christina Eagle	Mikaela Ayira	Aliyah Khaylyn	Austyns Stancil
Snoop Dogg	~~Jake Tankersley~~	Torre Blake	ChrisDeo	Mary McAvoy	Georgia Starnes
Snoop Dogg	Michael Alexandersson	**Gail Bliss**	DREION	Suede Lacy	MisterMoon
Snoop Dogg	Eliza Pryor	Brad Sample			
Note: Italicized names are artists stolen from another team during the battles or the knockouts (names struck through within former teams). Underlined names are artists who were saved by their coach in the knockouts. Bolded names are artists who were saved by the “Coach Replay” in the Blind Auditions.

== Blind auditions ==
The show began with the Blind Auditions on September 23, 2024. In each audition, an artist sings their piece in front of the coaches, whose chairs face the audience. If a coach is interested in working with the artist, they may press their button to face the artist. If only one coach presses the button, the artist automatically becomes part of their team. If multiple coaches turn, they will compete for the artist, who will decide which team they will join. Each coach has one "block" to prevent another coach from getting an artist. This season, each coach ends up with 14 artists by the end of the blind auditions, creating a total of 56 artists advancing to the battles.

This season, a new feature was introduced, dubbed the "Coach Replay." This addition allows each coach to press their button at least one time in the span of the blind auditions for an artist that was originally eliminated with no coaches turning. The artist is subsequently defaulted to that team if only one coach use or gets to pick if multiple do so, but the coach is penalized with replay usage if a singer joins that team. (Note: If a coach uses Coach Replay with multiple chairs turned, it is a “steal”.) The recipients of this feature for each team were Kendall Eugene for Team Reba, Gail Bliss for Team Snoop, Jaylen Dunham for Team Gwen, and Mark Shiiba for Team Bublé, respectively.

With Michael Bublé having four 4-chair turn contestants, he tied with Camila Cabello and Reba McEntire in which a debuting coach has the most 4-chair turns in their season.

In addition, Gwen Stefani received the most 4-chair turns during a single season in her eight seasons as a coach, with a total of six, which is also the most 4-chair turns a female coach received in all 26 seasons of the show.

Blind auditions color key
✔	Coach hit his/her "I WANT YOU" button
	Artist defaulted to this coach's team
	Artist selected to join this coach's team
	Artist was originally eliminated with no coach pressing their button, but was saved by the "Coach Replay"
	Artist was eliminated with no coach pressing their button
✘	Coach pressed "I WANT YOU" button, but was blocked by another coach from getting the artist
	Blocked by Michael; Blocked by Gwen; Blocked by Reba; Blocked by Snoop

=== Episode 1 (September 23) ===
First blind auditions results
Order	Artist	Age	Hometown	Song	Coach's and artist's choices			
Order	Artist	Age	Hometown	Song	Michael	Gwen	Reba	Snoop
1	Jake Tankersley	31	Claremore, Oklahoma	"Something in the Orange"	✔	✔	✘	✔
2	Sofronio Vasquez	31	Utica, New York / Mindanao, Philippines	"I'm Goin' Down"	✔	✔	✔	✔
3	Jan Dan (Najee Daniels)	29	Newark, New Jersey	"Almost Doesn't Count"	✔	✔	–	–
4	RAVS (Amanda Bongiovanni)	29	Dallas, Texas	"Say So"	–	–	–	–
5	Danny Joseph	37	Dallas, Texas / London, England	"I Put a Spell on You"	✘	✔	✔	✔
6	Ben Fagerstedt	23	Aberdeen, Washington	"I've Got You Under My Skin" (Note: Fagerstedt and Buble later performed a snippet of the same song as a duet.)	–	–	–	–
7	Torre Blake	30	Austin, Texas	"On & On"	–	✔	–	✔
8	Kendall Eugene	37	Indiana, Pennsylvania	"Don't Think Jesus"	–	–	✔	–
9	Kiara Vega	18	Tampa, Florida / Vega Baja, Puerto Rico	"Amor Eterno"	✔	–	✔	✔
10	ChrisDeo (Christina Ramdeo)	16	Queens, New York	"I Won't Give Up"	✔	–	–	✔
11	Sydney Sterlace	15	Buffalo, New York	"Drivers License"	✔	✔	✔	✔

=== Episode 2 (September 30) ===
Among this episode's auditionees was Felsmere, who previously competed on the first season under her real name, Kelsey Rey, as part of Team CeeLo until her elimination in the battle rounds. Felsmere's reappearance marked the first time that a former contestant, who advanced to the battles, returned to compete in a later season as a solo artist, as well as the second returnee overall, after season 16 contestant Jej Vinson, who returned as part of the trio Sheer Element in season 23.

Second blind auditions results
Order	Artist	Age(s)	Hometown	Song	Coach's and artist's choices			
Order	Artist	Age(s)	Hometown	Song	Michael	Gwen	Reba	Snoop
1	DREION (Da'Dreion Murrell)	27	Omaha, Nebraska	"Shining Star"	✔	✔	✔	✔
2	Mor Ilderton	20	Teays Valley, West Virginia	"Coal"	✔	–	✘	✔
3	Crystalla Gonzalez	34	Queens, New York	"Heartbreaker"	–	–	–	–
4	Felsmere (Kelsey Ray)	33	Viera Beach, Florida	"Some Kind of Wonderful"	✔	✔	–	–
5	Kamila Kiehne	17	Los Lunas, New Mexico	"Black Velvet"	✔	–	✔	✔
6	Tanner Frick	26	Manchester, Tennessee	"Thought You Should Know"	✔	✔	✔	✔
7	Iris Herrera	19	Newaygo, Michigan	"Gypsy"	–	–	–	–
8	Rowdy Shea	23	Bowling Green, Kentucky	"You Shouldn't Kiss Me Like This"	✔	✔	–	–
9	323 (Jonathan Perry, Jacob Sumpter, and Kinsley Treadwell)	18–33	Tallahassee, Florida	"(You Drive Me) Crazy"	✔	–	✔	–
10	Gail Bliss	61	Grants Pass, Oregon / Little River, South Carolina	"If It Hadn't Been for Love"	–	–	–	✔
11	Austyns Stancil	34	Oakland, California	"Ooo Baby Baby"	✔	✔	✔	✔

=== Episode 3 (October 7) ===
Among the episode's auditionees was Jeremy Beloate, who previously competed on the eleventh season of America's Got Talent as part of the vocal group OneVoice, until their elimination in the Judge Cuts.

Third blind auditions results
Order	Artist	Age(s)	Hometown	Song	Coach's and artist's choices			
Order	Artist	Age(s)	Hometown	Song	Michael	Gwen	Reba	Snoop
1	Georgia Starnes	21	Dallas, Texas	"Too Good at Goodbyes"	✔	✔	✔	✔
2	Edward Preble	19	Fernandina Beach, Florida	"Luck Be a Lady"	✔	–	–	✔
3	Creigh Riepe	32	Nashville, Tennessee	"Beautiful Things"	–	✔	✔	–
4	Tiffany Taylor	39	Baltimore, Maryland	"What Was I Made For?"	–	–	–	–
5	Adam Bohanan	40	Long Island, New York / Minneapolis, Minnesota	"Home"	–	–	✔	–
6	Jeremy Beloate	25	Memphis, Tennessee	"Heartbreak Anniversary"	✔	✔	✔	✔
7	Jaylen Dunham	14	Charlotte, North Carolina	"Listen"	–	✔	–	–
8	MisterMoon (Leah Colon and Savs [Savannah Walter])	26 & 28	Nashville, Tennessee	"Deeper Well"	–	–	✔	✔
9	Tate Renner	24	Nashville, Tennessee	"Hurricane"	✔	–	✔	✔
10	Malcolm-Ali	27	Galloway, New Jersey	"Love Will Lead You Back"	–	–	–	–
11	Frankie Torres	24	Minnetonka, Minnesota	"Magic Man"	✔	✔	✔	✔

=== Episode 4 (October 8) ===
Among this episode's auditionees was Sloane Simon, who previously competed on the nineteenth season of American Idol.

Fourth blind auditions results
Order	Artist	Age	Hometown	Song	Coach's and artist's choices			
Order	Artist	Age	Hometown	Song	Michael	Gwen	Reba	Snoop
1	J.Paul (Jason Calhoun)	37	Washington, D.C.	"I Keep Forgettin' (Every Time You're Near)"	✔	✔	✔	–
2	Sloane Simon	19	Pittsburgh, Pennsylvania	"Unwritten"	✔	✔	–	–
3	Michael Alexandersson	26	Salado, Texas	"Ain't That a Kick in the Head"	–	✔	–	✔
4	Jamison Puckett	34	Memphis, Tennessee	"Faithfully"	✔	–	✔	–
5	Zach Foreman	34	Hattiesburg, Mississippi	"Eight Second Ride"	–	–	–	–
6	Gabrielle Zabosky	25	Oxford, Pennsylvania	"Mr. Know-It-All"	✔	✔	✔	✘
7	Christina Eagle	23	Catawba, North Carolina	"Wildflowers and Wild Horses"	–	–	–	✔
8	Jaukeem Fortson	13	Elberton, Georgia	"Easy on Me"	✔	–	✔	✔
9	Kourtney White	37	McKinney, Texas	"Remedy"	–	–	–	–
10	Kevin James Graham	33	Boston, Massachusetts	"Stay with Me"	–	–	✔	–
11	Shye (Madison Shyelle Roberts)	17	Bethlehem, Pennsylvania / Glen Cove, New York	"Superman (It's Not Easy)"	✔	✔	✔	✔

=== Episode 5 (October 14) ===
Among this episode's auditionees was Camryn Brooks, who previously auditioned unsuccessfully in season 21, and Eliza Pryor, who previously competed on the seventeenth season of America's Got Talent as part of the act Acapop!, and played Valeria in the TV show Team Kaylie.

Fifth blind auditions results
Order	Artist	Age	Hometown	Song	Coach's and artist's choices			
Order	Artist	Age	Hometown	Song	Michael	Gwen	Reba	Snoop
1	Cameron Wright	34	Minneapolis, Minnesota	"The Way We Were"	✔	✔	✔	✔
2	Eliza Pryor	17	Dallas, Texas	"Linger"	–	–	–	✔
3	Kay Sibal	24	Los Angeles, California	"From the Start"	✔	✔	–	✔
4	Drake Hyde	21	Sallisaw, Oklahoma	"Little Rock"	–	–	–	–
5	Mary McAvoy	35	Walpole, Massachusetts	"Say You Love Me"	✔	–	–	✔
6	Lauren-Michael Sellers	35	Birmingham, Alabama	"Oceans (Where Feet May Fail)"	✔	✔	✔	✔
7	Mark Shiiba	29	Swarthmore, Pennsylvania	"Don't Think Twice, It's All Right"	✔	–	–	–
8	BEYA (Anna Isabel Fernandez)	24	Kauaʻi, Hawaii	"Our Day Will Come"	–	✔	–	–
9	Tsola (Oritsetsolaye Alexandria Akuya)	27	Silver Spring, Maryland	"On My Mama"	–	–	✔	–
10	Deon Jones	32	Los Angeles, California	"Little Ghetto Boy"	–	–	✔	–
11	Brad Sample	38	Nashville, Tennessee	"The Letter"	–	–	✔	✔
12	Dahlia Jones	28	Minneapolis, Minnesota	"You Know I'm No Good"	–	–	–	–
13	Camryn Brooks	24	Mount Shasta, California	"Light On"	✔	✔	✔	✔

=== Episode 6 (October 15) ===
Among this episode's auditionees was Cassidy Lee, who previously auditioned unsuccessfully in season 18.

Sixth blind auditions results
Order	Artist	Age	Hometown	Song	Coach's and artist's choices			
Order	Artist	Age	Hometown	Song	Michael	Gwen	Reba	Snoop
1	Katie O. (Katherine Ondrejicka)	18	Jacksonville, Florida	"One Way Ticket (Because I Can)"	✔	✔	✔	✔
2	Mikaela Ayira	16	Johns Creek, Georgia	"Human"	–	–	✔	✔
3	Cassidy Lee	28	Jacksonville, Florida	"You're No Good"	✔	–	–	–
4	Torion Sellers	26	Atlanta, Georgia	"There Goes My Baby"	✔	–	–	–
5	Cozy Len	43	Baton Rouge, Louisiana	"I'll Make Love to You"	–	✔	✔	–
6	Zaza Benjamin	16	Oakland, California	"Hard Place"	–	–	–	–
7	Jose Luis	21	Carolina, Puerto Rico	"Traitor"	✔	✔	✔	✔
8	Joe Martinez	20	Polson, Montana	"Stuck in the Middle with You"	–	Team full	–	–
9	Aliyah Khaylyn	23	Philadelphia, Pennsylvania	"Love and War"	✔	Team full	✔	✔
10	Alison Elena	29	Nashville, Tennessee	"So Small"	Team full	Team full	✔	✔
11	Laney Lynx (Melanie Donnelly)	32	Los Angeles, California	"Jaded"	Team full	Team full	Team full	–
12	Suede Lacy	29	Dallas, Texas	"Redbone"	Team full	Team full	Team full	✔

== Battles ==
The second stage of the show, the battles, aired from October 21, 2024, to November 4, 2024, consisting of episodes 7 through 11. In this round, the coaches pitted two of their artists in a singing match and then select one of them to advance to the next round. For the fourth consecutive season, there were no guest advisors for the battles, which meant the artists were mentored solely by their coaches.

This season’s battle rounds are similar to season 24: losing artists may be "stolen" by another coach, becoming new members of that coach's team. Multiple coaches can attempt to steal an artist, resulting in a competition for the artist, who will then decide which team to join. Each coach has two steals to use this round. At the end of this round, nine artists will remain on each team; seven will be the battle winners, while the other two are stolen from another coach. In total, 36 artists advanced to the knockouts.

Battles color key
Artist won the battle and advanced to the knockouts
Artist lost the battle, but was stolen by another coach and advanced to the knockouts
Artist lost the battle and was eliminated

Battles results
Episode	Coach	Order	Winner	Song	Loser	'Steal' result			
Episode	Coach	Order	Winner	Song	Loser	Michael	Gwen	Reba	Snoop
Episode 7 (Monday, October 21, 2024)	Snoop	1	Christina Eagle	"Redneck Woman"	Gail Bliss	–	–	–	N/A
Episode 7 (Monday, October 21, 2024)	Gwen	2	Sydney Sterlace	"Birds of a Feather"	Sloane Simon	✔	N/A	✔	✔
Episode 7 (Monday, October 21, 2024)	Reba	3	Kendall Eugene	"Bring On the Rain"	Alison Elena	–	–	N/A	–
Episode 7 (Monday, October 21, 2024)	Snoop	4	Mikaela Ayira	"A Thousand Miles"	Eliza Pryor	–	–	–	N/A
Episode 7 (Monday, October 21, 2024)	Gwen	5	Jan Dan	"For Once in My Life"	Jaylen Dunham	–	N/A	–	–
Episode 7 (Monday, October 21, 2024)	Michael	6	Kiara Vega	"Iris"	Mor Ilderton	N/A	✔	–	–
Episode 8 (Tuesday, October 22, 2024)	Reba	1	Adam Bohanan	"Lose Control"	Kevin James Graham	–	–	N/A	–
Episode 8 (Tuesday, October 22, 2024)	Snoop	2	ChrisDeo	"Will You Still Love Me Tomorrow"	MisterMoon	–	–	–	N/A
Episode 8 (Tuesday, October 22, 2024)	Michael	3	Edward Preble	"What a Wonderful World"	Mark Shiiba	N/A	–	–	–
Episode 8 (Tuesday, October 22, 2024)	Michael	4	Jeremy Beloate	"Just the Way You Are"	Torion Sellers	N/A	–	–	–
Episode 8 (Tuesday, October 22, 2024)	Snoop	5	Torre Blake	"What You Won't Do for Love"	Suede Lacy	–	–	–	N/A
Episode 8 (Tuesday, October 22, 2024)	Gwen	6	Gabrielle Zabosky	"Never Tear Us Apart"	Frankie Torres	–	N/A	✔	–
Episode 9 (Monday, October 28, 2024)	Reba	1	Danny Joseph	"It's a Man's Man's Man's World"	Deon Jones	–	✔	N/A	–
Episode 9 (Monday, October 28, 2024)	Snoop	2	Jake Tankersley	"Stuck on You"	Brad Sample	–	Team full	–	N/A
Episode 9 (Monday, October 28, 2024)	Gwen	3	Felsmere	"Summer Breeze"	Cozy Len	–	Team full	–	–
Episode 9 (Monday, October 28, 2024)	Michael	4	Shye	"Love Yourself"	Jamison Puckett	N/A	Team full	–	–
Episode 9 (Monday, October 28, 2024)	Reba	5	Lauren-Michael Sellers	"You Will Be Found"	Creigh Riepe	–	Team full	N/A	–
Episode 9 (Monday, October 28, 2024)	Gwen	6	Jose Luis	"Lay Me Down"	Austyns Stancil	✔	Team full	✔	✔
Episode 10 (Tuesday, October 29, 2024)	Snoop	1	Georgia Starnes	"Perfect Combination"	DREION	–	Team full	–	N/A
Episode 10 (Tuesday, October 29, 2024)	Gwen	2	Kay Sibal	"Please Please Please"	BEYA	–	Team full	–	–
Episode 10 (Tuesday, October 29, 2024)	Reba	3	Jaukeem Fortson	"Higher Love"	Tsola	–	Team full	N/A	–
Episode 10 (Tuesday, October 29, 2024)	Michael	4	Sofronio Vasquez	"The Power of Love"	Aliyah Khaylyn	N/A	Team full	–	✔
Episode 11 (Monday, November 4, 2024)	Michael	1	J.Paul	"Toxic"	Kamila Kiehne	N/A	Team full	–	Team full
Episode 11 (Monday, November 4, 2024)	Gwen	2	Camryn Brooks	"I Remember Everything"	Rowdy Shea	–	Team full	–	Team full
Episode 11 (Monday, November 4, 2024)	Reba	3	Tate Renner	"Need a Favor"	Tanner Frick	✔	Team full	N/A	Team full
Episode 11 (Monday, November 4, 2024)	Snoop	4	Mary McAvoy	"I Only Have Eyes for You"	Michael Alexandersson	Team full	Team full	–	Team full
Episode 11 (Monday, November 4, 2024)	Reba	5	Katie O.	"Lonesome Loser"	323	Team full	Team full	N/A	Team full
Episode 11 (Monday, November 4, 2024)	Michael	6	Cameron Wright	"Hero"	Cassidy Lee	Team full	Team full	✔	Team full

== Knockouts ==
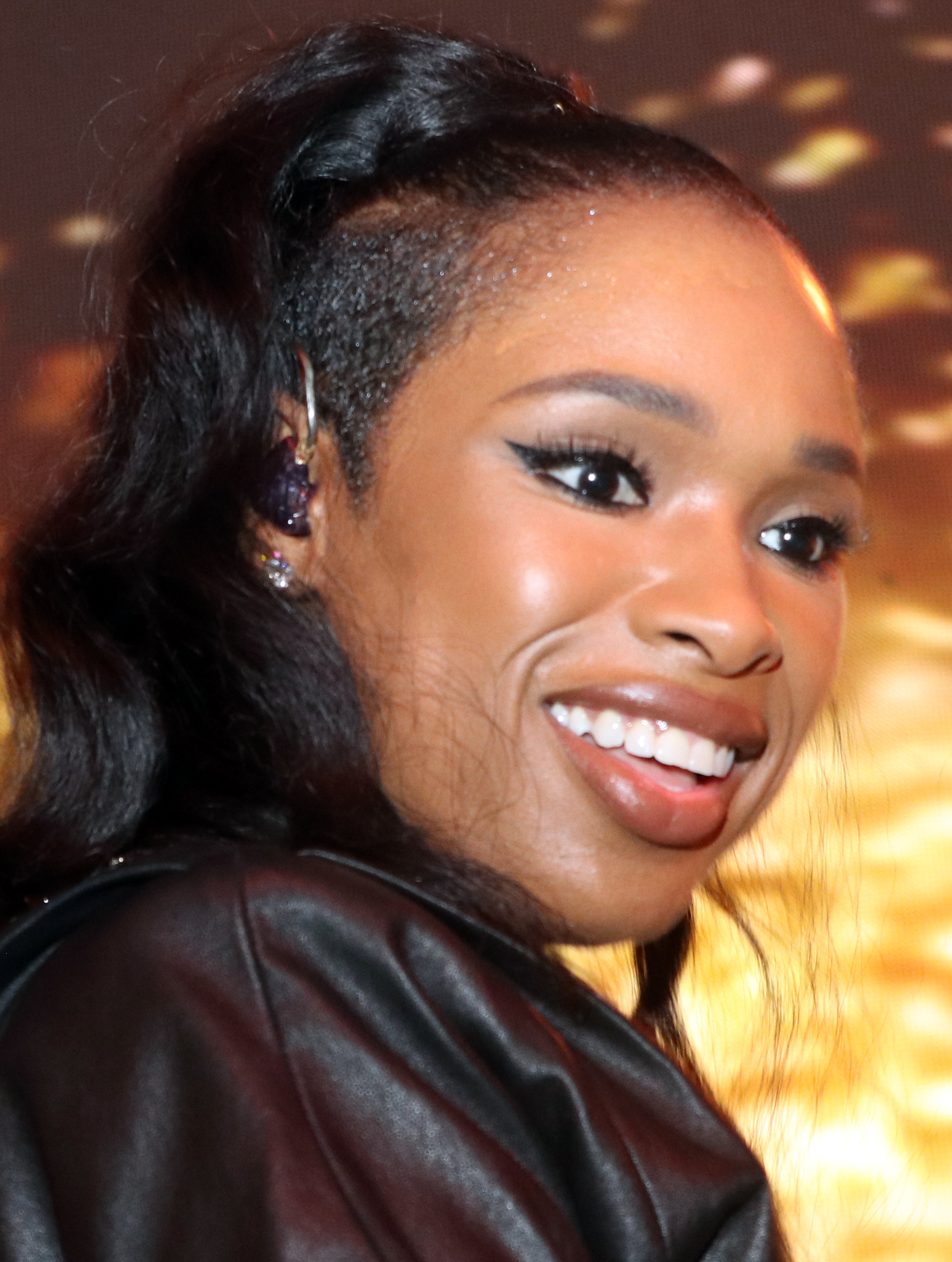
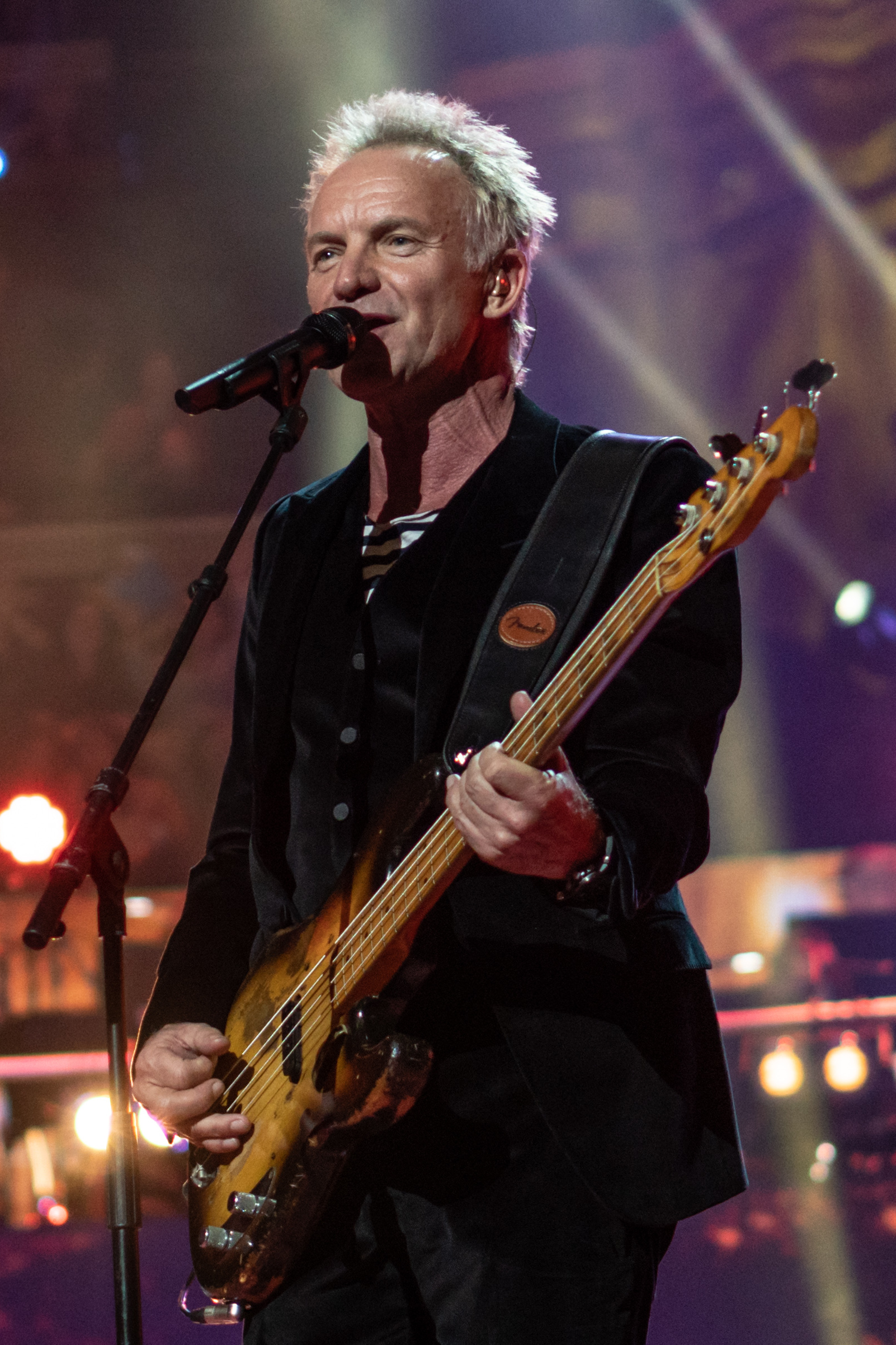
Jennifer Hudson served as mega mentor for Teams Bublé and Reba, and Sting served as mega mentor for Teams Gwen and Snoop.

The third stage of the show, the knockouts, aired from November 11 to November 18, consisting of episodes 12 through 14. Jennifer Hudson served as mega mentor for Teams Bublé and Reba, and Sting served as mega mentor for Teams Gwen and Snoop. In the round, each coach groups three of their artists in a singing match. The artists themselves will select the song they will sing in the round, and then their coach selects one of them to advance to the playoffs.

This season's Knockout rounds are similar to seasons 22 and 24, with an exception being that there were no 'super saves,' in contrast to Season 24. Throughout the round, each coach can steal one losing artist from an opposing team and save one of their artists. At the end of the round, 12 artists won their knockout, remaining on their teams; four artists are stolen; and four are saved by their respective coaches. In all, a total 20 artists advanced to the playoffs.

Two contestants withdrew from the show in this round: in episode 12, Tanner Frick from Team Bublé withdrew from the show, thus leaving a two-way-knockout between Cameron Wright and Sloane Simon; in episode 14, Mor Ilderton from Team Gwen withdrew from the show, leaving a two-way-knockout between Jan Dan and Sydney Sterlace.

Knockouts color key
Artist won the knockout and advanced to the playoffs
Artist lost the knockout, but was stolen by another coach and advanced to the playoffs
Artist lost the knockout, but was saved by their coach and advanced to the playoffs
Artist lost the knockout and was eliminated

Knockouts results
Episode	Coach	Order	Winner		Losers		'Steal'/'Save' result			
Episode	Coach	Order	Song	Artist	Artist	Song	Michael	Gwen	Reba	Snoop
Episode 12 (Monday, November 11, 2024)	Snoop	1	"Dance with My Father"	Austyns Stancil	Christina Eagle	"My Church"	✔	✔	✔	✔
Episode 12 (Monday, November 11, 2024)	Snoop	1	"Dance with My Father"	Austyns Stancil	Jake Tankersley	"Going, Going, Gone"	–	✔	✔	N/A
Episode 12 (Monday, November 11, 2024)	Reba	2	"Colors"	Adam Bohanan	Cassidy Lee	"Love Me Like a Man"	–	N/A	–	–
Episode 12 (Monday, November 11, 2024)	Reba	2	"Colors"	Adam Bohanan	Jaukeem Fortson	"God Only Knows"	✔	N/A	–	–
Episode 12 (Monday, November 11, 2024)	Gwen	3	"We Can't Be Friends (Wait for Your Love)"	Jose Luis	Camryn Brooks	"Glitter in the Air"	N/A	–	–	–
Episode 12 (Monday, November 11, 2024)	Gwen	3	"We Can't Be Friends (Wait for Your Love)"	Jose Luis	Deon Jones	"Nutbush City Limits"	N/A	–	–	–
Episode 12 (Monday, November 11, 2024)	Michael	4	"You're All I Need to Get By"	Cameron Wright	Sloane Simon	"Can't Catch Me Now"	✔	N/A	–	–
Episode 13 (Tuesday, November 12, 2024)	Gwen	1	"Used to Be Young"	Gabrielle Zabosky	Felsmere	"Son of a Preacher Man"	Team full	–	–	–
Episode 13 (Tuesday, November 12, 2024)	Gwen	1	"Used to Be Young"	Gabrielle Zabosky	Kay Sibal	"One Last Time"	Team full	–	–	–
Episode 13 (Tuesday, November 12, 2024)	Reba	2	"Turn On the Radio"	Katie O.	Frankie Torres	"You and I"	Team full	N/A	–	–
Episode 13 (Tuesday, November 12, 2024)	Reba	2	"Turn On the Radio"	Katie O.	Kendall Eugene	"World on Fire"	Team full	N/A	–	–
Episode 13 (Tuesday, November 12, 2024)	Michael	3	"The One That Got Away"	Shye	J.Paul	"Kiss from a Rose"	Team full	N/A	–	–
Episode 13 (Tuesday, November 12, 2024)	Michael	3	"The One That Got Away"	Shye	Edward Preble	"Send In the Clowns"	Team full	N/A	✔	–
Episode 14 (Monday, November 18, 2024)	Reba	1	"Hold On to Me"	Lauren-Michael Sellers	Tate Renner	"In Color"	Team full	N/A	–	–
Episode 14 (Monday, November 18, 2024)	Reba	1	"Hold On to Me"	Lauren-Michael Sellers	Danny Joseph	"It Hurt So Bad"	Team full	N/A	✔	–
Episode 14 (Monday, November 18, 2024)	Gwen	2	"Bruises"	Sydney Sterlace	Jan Dan	"Angels like You"	Team full	✔	Team full	–
Episode 14 (Monday, November 18, 2024)	Snoop	3	"Angel"	Aliyah Khaylyn	Georgia Starnes	"Parachute"	Team full	Team full	Team full	N/A
Episode 14 (Monday, November 18, 2024)	Snoop	3	"Angel"	Aliyah Khaylyn	Mary McAvoy	"High and Dry"	Team full	Team full	Team full	N/A
Episode 14 (Monday, November 18, 2024)	Snoop	4	"Scars to Your Beautiful"	Mikaela Ayira	ChrisDeo	"Beneath Your Beautiful"	Team full	Team full	Team full	N/A
Episode 14 (Monday, November 18, 2024)	Snoop	4	"Scars to Your Beautiful"	Mikaela Ayira	Torre Blake	"Slow Burn"	Team full	Team full	Team full	N/A
Episode 14 (Monday, November 18, 2024)	Michael	5	"You Don't Have to Say You Love Me"	Sofronio Vasquez	Kiara Vega	"Call Out My Name"	Team full	Team full	Team full	–
Episode 14 (Monday, November 18, 2024)	Michael	5	"You Don't Have to Say You Love Me"	Sofronio Vasquez	Jeremy Beloate	"Golden Hour"	Team full	Team full	Team full	✔

== Playoffs ==
The fourth stage of the show, the playoffs, aired from November 19 to November 26, consisting of episodes 15 through 17. The top 20 artists perform for the coaches with a song of their choice. At the end of the round, each coach selects two of their artists to advance, creating a total of 8 artists advancing to the live shows, just like season 23.

Like season six, season 13, season 23, season 24, and the previous season, the playoffs were not contested live. They were prerecorded and taped at the same stage as the prior two rounds, hence the lack of an interactive viewer voting component or a subsequent results episode. Team Gwen performed on the first episode, Teams Snoop and Reba performed on the second episode, and Team Bublé performed on the third episode.

Much like last season, this round features guest mentors, dubbed "playoff advisors," for each team. The advisors are Carly Pearce for Team Bublé, Machine Gun Kelly for Team Gwen, Lainey Wilson for Team Reba, and Simone Biles for Team Snoop.

Playoffs color key
Artist was chosen by their coach to move on to the live shows
Artist was eliminated

Playoffs results
Episode	Coach	Order	Artist	Song	Result
Episode 15 (Tuesday, November 19, 2024)	Gwen Stefani	1	Jose Luis	"No More Drama"	Eliminated
Episode 15 (Tuesday, November 19, 2024)	Gwen Stefani	2	Jake Tankersley	"The Painter"	Eliminated
Episode 15 (Tuesday, November 19, 2024)	Gwen Stefani	3	Gabrielle Zabosky	"Listen to Your Heart"	Eliminated
Episode 15 (Tuesday, November 19, 2024)	Gwen Stefani	4	Jan Dan	"Dust in the Wind"	Advanced
Episode 15 (Tuesday, November 19, 2024)	Gwen Stefani	5	Sydney Sterlace	"betty"	Advanced
Episode 16 (Monday, November 25, 2024)	Reba McEntire	1	Adam Bohanan	"Think I'm in Love with You"	Advanced
Episode 16 (Monday, November 25, 2024)	Snoop Dogg	2	Christina Eagle	"Fancy"	Advanced
Episode 16 (Monday, November 25, 2024)	Reba McEntire	3	Edward Preble	"All of Me"	Eliminated
Episode 16 (Monday, November 25, 2024)	Snoop Dogg	4	Aliyah Khaylyn	"I Have Nothing"	Eliminated
Episode 16 (Monday, November 25, 2024)	Reba McEntire	5	Katie O.	"Hang Tight Honey"	Eliminated
Episode 16 (Monday, November 25, 2024)	Snoop Dogg	6	Austyns Stancil	"Adore"	Eliminated
Episode 16 (Monday, November 25, 2024)	Reba McEntire	7	Lauren-Michael Sellers	"I Am Not Okay"	Eliminated
Episode 16 (Monday, November 25, 2024)	Snoop Dogg	8	Mikaela Ayira	"Love"	Eliminated
Episode 16 (Monday, November 25, 2024)	Reba McEntire	9	Danny Joseph	"I Heard It Through the Grapevine"	Advanced
Episode 16 (Monday, November 25, 2024)	Snoop Dogg	10	Jeremy Beloate	"The Impossible Dream (The Quest)"	Advanced
Episode 17 (Tuesday, November 26, 2024)	Michael Bublé	1	Shye	"Story of My Life"	Advanced
Episode 17 (Tuesday, November 26, 2024)	Michael Bublé	2	Jaukeem Fortson	"Man in the Mirror"	Eliminated
Episode 17 (Tuesday, November 26, 2024)	Michael Bublé	3	Sloane Simon	"Good Luck, Babe!"	Eliminated
Episode 17 (Tuesday, November 26, 2024)	Michael Bublé	4	Cameron Wright	"Exhale (Shoop Shoop)"	Eliminated
Episode 17 (Tuesday, November 26, 2024)	Michael Bublé	5	Sofronio Vasquez	"Crying"	Advanced

== Live shows ==
=== Week 1: Top 8 – Semi-finals (December 2–3) ===
The Top 8 each performed a solo song and a Sting or The Police duo with a fellow semifinalist on Monday, with the results following on Tuesday. Mega mentor Sting returned to perform bass for the duets. The four artists with the most votes automatically moved on to the finale, while the remaining four artists competed in the Instant Save for the fifth and final spot in the finale.

With the advancements of Sofronio Vasquez, Shye, and Jeremy Beloate, Michael Bublé and Snoop Dogg became the eleventh and twelfth new coaches to successfully bring their team to the finale, the first being Usher (Michelle Chamuel in the fourth season), the second being Alicia Keys (Wé McDonald in the eleventh season), the third being Kelly Clarkson (Brynn Cartelli in the fourteenth season), the fourth being John Legend (Maelyn Jarmon in the sixteenth season), the fifth being Nick Jonas (Thunderstorm Artis in the eighteenth season), the sixth being Camila Cabello (Morgan Myles in the twenty-second season), the seventh Chance the Rapper (Sorelle in the twenty-third season), the eighth Niall Horan (Gina Miles also in the twenty-third season), the ninth Reba McEntire (Ruby Leigh and Jacquie Roar in the twenty-fourth season), and the tenth Dan + Shay (Karen Waldrup in the twenty-fifth season).

With the advancement of Sydney Sterlace, Gwen Stefani successfully brought an artist to the finale by a public vote in a season not dependent upon team quotas for the first time. This was also the first season since season 19 where Stefani is represented in the finale.

This was the first season since season 23 that all four coaches were represented in the finale, and only the second season in history that both first-time coaches had an artist in the finale (the first two being Chance the Rapper and Niall Horan).

It is the second time in The Voice history since season 24 that all the finalists were originally a four-chair turn in Blind Auditions, and a first-time coach (in this case, Michael Bublé) with two artists competing in the finale, after McEntire.

Live shows color key
Artist was saved by public's vote
Artist was placed in the bottom four and competed for an Instant Save
Artist was instantly saved
Artist was eliminated

Semi-finals results
Episode	Coach	Order	Artist	Solo song	Sting / The Police Duo	Result
Episode 18 (Monday, December 2, 2024)	Snoop Dogg	1 (5)	Christina Eagle	"Man! I Feel Like a Woman!"	"If You Love Somebody Set Them Free"	Bottom four
Episode 18 (Monday, December 2, 2024)	Gwen Stefani	2 (8)	Jan Dan	"Open Arms"	"Roxanne"	Bottom four
Episode 18 (Monday, December 2, 2024)	Reba McEntire	4 (8)	Adam Bohanan	"What's Going On"	"Roxanne"	Bottom four
Episode 18 (Monday, December 2, 2024)	Gwen Stefani	6 (10)	Sydney Sterlace	"When the Party's Over"	"Fields of Gold"	Public's vote
Episode 18 (Monday, December 2, 2024)	Michael Bublé	7 (10)	Shye	"The Joke"	"Fields of Gold"	Public's vote
Episode 18 (Monday, December 2, 2024)	Snoop Dogg	9 (3)	Jeremy Beloate	"I (Who Have Nothing)"	"Every Breath You Take"	Public's vote
Episode 18 (Monday, December 2, 2024)	Reba McEntire	11 (5)	Danny Joseph	"I Was Wrong"	"If You Love Somebody Set Them Free"	Bottom four
Episode 18 (Monday, December 2, 2024)	Michael Bublé	12 (3)	Sofronio Vasquez	"If I Can Dream"	"Every Breath You Take"	Public's vote
Episode 19 (Tuesday, December 3, 2024)	Snoop Dogg	1	Christina Eagle	"Heart Like a Truck"		Eliminated
Episode 19 (Tuesday, December 3, 2024)	Reba McEntire	2	Adam Bohanan	"Pretty Wings"		Eliminated
Episode 19 (Tuesday, December 3, 2024)	Gwen Stefani	3	Jan Dan	"Gravity"		Eliminated
Episode 19 (Tuesday, December 3, 2024)	Reba McEntire	4	Danny Joseph	"The House of the Rising Sun"		Instantly Saved

Non-competition performances
Order	Performers	Song
19.1	Reba McEntire	"Consider Me Gone"
19.2	Gwen Stefani	"Somebody Else's"
19.3	October London	"3rd Shift"

=== Week 2: Finale (December 9–10) ===
The season finale ran through two nights, Monday and Tuesday, December 9 through 10, 2024, comprising episodes 20 and 22. The Top 5 performed on Monday, with each artist performing an up-tempo song and a ballad for the title of The Voice. At the episode's conclusion, the overnight voting for the season's winner began. The following night, on Tuesday, the finalists performed a duet with their respective coaches, before the results of the public vote were announced and the winner of the season was named.

Sofronio Vasquez was named the winner of the season, marking Michael Bublé's first win as a coach. Bublé became the fourth new coach to win the show on his first attempt, the third being Niall Horan, who won with Gina Miles in the twenty-third season, the second being John Legend, who won with Maelyn Jarmon in the sixteenth season, and the first being Kelly Clarkson, who won with Brynn Cartelli in the fourteenth season.

In addition, with Sofronio Vasquez and Shye in the top two, Bublé also became the third coach to have the top two artists of the season, the second being Reba McEntire, who had the top two artists in the twenty-fifth season; and the first being Blake Shelton, who had the top two artists in the third, eighteenth, and twenty-second seasons. (However, Bublé became the first coach to accomplish this on his first attempt as a coach.)

Finale results
Coach	Artist	Episode 20 (Monday, December 9, 2024)				Episode 22(Tuesday, December 10, 2024)		Result
Coach	Artist	Order	Up-tempo song	Order	Ballad	Order	Duet (with coach)	Result
Reba McEntire	Danny Joseph	1	"Ain't No Love in Oklahoma"	7	"Back to Black"	14	"You Don't Know Me"	Fourth place
Snoop Dogg	Jeremy Beloate	2	"What the World Needs Now Is Love"	6	"Dancing on My Own"	12	"(Sittin' On) The Dock of the Bay"	Fifth place
Michael Bublé	Shye	3	"One of Us"	10	"Falling"	13	"Somethin' Stupid"	Runner-up
Gwen Stefani	Sydney Sterlace	4	"I Love You, I'm Sorry"	9	"Chasing Cars"	11	"Wild World"	Third place
Michael Bublé	Sofronio Vasquez	5	"Unstoppable"	8	"A Million Dreams"	15	"Who's Lovin' You"	Winner

Non-competition performances
Order	Performers	Song
20.1	Michael Bublé and Carly Pearce	"Maybe This Christmas"
22.1	The Top 8 Artists	"Defying Gravity"
22.2	Dan + Shay	"Officially Christmas"
22.3	Myles Smith	"Stargazing"
22.4	Huntley	"Skyline Drive"
22.5	Riley Green ft. Ella Langley	"Don't Mind If I Do"
22.6	Snoop Dogg and Sting	"Another Part of Me"
22.7	Kelly Clarkson	"You for Christmas"
22.8	Tears for Fears	"Everybody Wants to Rule the World" / "The Girl That I Call Home"
22.9	Asher HaVon	"Thank You"

== Elimination chart ==
Results color key
Winner	Saved by an instant save (via Voice App)
Runner-up	Saved by the public
Third place	Saved by their coach
Fourth place	Eliminated
Fifth place

Coaches color key
Team Bublé
Team Gwen
Team Reba
Team Snoop

=== Overall ===
Elimination chart for The Voice season 26
Artists	Playoffs	Semi-final	Finale
Sofronio Vasquez	Safe	Safe	Winner
Shye	Safe	Safe	Runner-up
Sydney Sterlace	Safe	Safe	Third place
Danny Joseph	Safe	Safe	Fourth place
Jeremy Beloate	Safe	Safe	Fifth place
Adam Bohanan	Safe	Eliminated	Eliminated (Semi-finals)
Jan Dan	Safe	Eliminated	Eliminated (Semi-finals)
Christina Eagle	Safe	Eliminated	Eliminated (Semi-finals)
Mikaela Ayira	Eliminated	Eliminated (Playoffs)	
Jaukeem Fortson	Eliminated	Eliminated (Playoffs)	
Aliyah Khaylyn	Eliminated	Eliminated (Playoffs)	
Jose Luis	Eliminated	Eliminated (Playoffs)	
Katie O.	Eliminated	Eliminated (Playoffs)	
Edward Preble	Eliminated	Eliminated (Playoffs)	
Lauren-Michael Sellers	Eliminated	Eliminated (Playoffs)	
Sloane Simon	Eliminated	Eliminated (Playoffs)	
Austyns Stancil	Eliminated	Eliminated (Playoffs)	
Jake Tankersley	Eliminated	Eliminated (Playoffs)	
Cameron Wright	Eliminated	Eliminated (Playoffs)	
Gabrielle Zabosky	Eliminated	Eliminated (Playoffs)	

=== Per team ===
Elimination chart for The Voice season 26 per team
Artists	Playoffs	Semi-final	Finale
Sofronio Vasquez	Advanced	Advanced	Winner
Shye	Advanced	Advanced	Runner-up
Jaukeem Fortson	Eliminated		
Sloane Simon	Eliminated		
Cameron Wright	Eliminated		
Sydney Sterlace	Advanced	Advanced	Third place
Jan Dan	Advanced	Eliminated	
Jose Luis	Eliminated		
Jake Tankersley	Eliminated		
Gabrielle Zabosky	Eliminated		
Danny Joseph	Advanced	Advanced	Fourth place
Adam Bohanan	Advanced	Eliminated	
Katie O.	Eliminated		
Edward Preble	Eliminated		
Lauren-Michael Sellers	Eliminated		
Jeremy Beloate	Advanced	Advanced	Fifth place
Christina Eagle	Advanced	Eliminated	
Mikaela Ayira	Eliminated		
Aliyah Khaylyn	Eliminated		
Austyns Stancil	Eliminated		

== Ratings ==
Viewership and ratings per episode of The Voice season 26
No.	Title	Air date	Timeslot (ET)	Rating (18–49)	Viewers (millions)
1	"The Blind Auditions, Season Premiere"	September 23, 2024	Monday 8:00 p.m.	0.5	5.96
2	"The Blind Auditions, Part 2"	September 30, 2024	Monday 8:00 p.m.	0.5	5.88
3	"The Blind Auditions, Part 3"	October 7, 2024	Monday 8:00 p.m.	0.5	4.93
4	"The Blind Auditions, Part 4"	October 8, 2024	Tuesday 8:00 p.m.	0.5	5.20
5	"The Blind Auditions, Part 5"	October 14, 2024	Monday 8:00 p.m.	0.4	5.37
6	"The Blind Auditions, Part 6"	October 15, 2024	Tuesday 8:00 p.m.	0.5	5.13
7	"The Battles Premiere"	October 21, 2024	Monday 8:00 p.m.	0.5	5.78
8	"The Battles Part 2"	October 22, 2024	Tuesday 8:30 p.m.	0.4	4.58
9	"The Battles Part 3"	October 28, 2024	Monday 8:00 p.m.	0.4	5.12
10	"The Battles Part 4"	October 29, 2024	Tuesday 9:00 p.m.	0.3	4.29
11	"The Battles Part 5"	November 4, 2024	Monday 8:00 p.m.	0.4	4.97
12	"The Knockouts Premiere"	November 11, 2024	Monday 8:00 p.m.	0.4	5.70
13	"The Knockouts Part 2"	November 12, 2024	Tuesday 9:00 p.m.	0.4	3.97
14	"The Knockouts Part 3"	November 18, 2024	Monday 8:00 p.m.	0.4	5.40
15	"The Playoffs Premiere"	November 19, 2024	Tuesday 9:00 p.m.	0.3	3.68
16	"The Playoffs Part 2"	November 25, 2024	Monday 8:00 p.m.	0.4	5.50
17	"The Playoffs Part 3"	November 26, 2024	Tuesday 9:00 p.m.	0.4	3.82
18	"Live Semi-Final Performances"	December 2, 2024	Monday 8:00 p.m.	0.4	5.40
19	"Live Semi-Final Eliminations"	December 3, 2024	Tuesday 9:00 p.m.	0.3	4.55
20	"Live Finale, Part 1"	December 9, 2024	Monday 8:00 p.m.	0.4	5.21
21	"Live: Recap Finale Top 5 Performances"	December 10, 2024	Tuesday 8:00 p.m.	0.3	4.04
22	"Live Finale, Part 2"	December 10, 2024	Tuesday 9:00 p.m.	0.4	5.71
