= Sofronio Vasquez =

Filipino singer (born 1992)

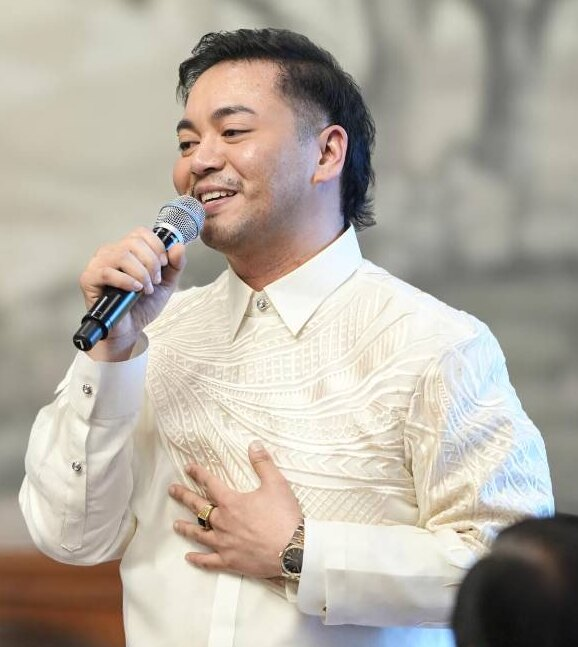
- Vasquez performing in Malacañang, January 2025
- Born: Sofronio Parojinog Vasquez III; November 8, 1992 (age 33); Ozamiz, Misamis Occidental, Philippines
- Agent: Star Magic (2025–present)
- Relatives: Reynaldo Parojinog Jr. (uncle)
- Musical career
- Genres: Pop; R&B; soul
- Occupations: Singer; songwriter
- Instrument: Vocals
- Years active: 2012–present
- Label: Universal Music Group
- Website: sofroniovasquez.com

Sofronio Parojinog Vasquez III (born November 8, 1992) is a Filipino singer based in the United States. He is the winner of season 26 of the American talent competition The Voice (2024). He is the first Filipino to win the competition, as well as its first male Asian winner.

Vasquez previously competed on the second season of Tawag ng Tanghalan in 2017, finishing as a finalist and returning for its all-star spin-off in 2019, where he finished in third place.

== Early and personal life ==
Vasquez was born in Misamis Occidental, Philippines, to Aida Parojinog, a member of a politically active family in Ozamiz, and Oniol Vasquez. He cites his father–whom he also regarded as his first coach–as being the impetus for his affinity for singing.

Vasquez studied dentistry and was a dental hygienist. After the death of his father in June 2018, he was inspired to pursue a singing career, working as a singer for the Carnival Cruise Line and entering singing competitions. In 2022, Vasquez moved to Utica, New York, where he worked as a dental assistant to provide for his family.

== Career ==
=== 2017–2019: Tawag ng Tanghalan ===
In 2017, Vasquez competed in the second season of Tawag ng Tanghalan, a segment of ABS-CBN's noontime variety show It's Showtime where he finished in seventh place. He later competed in the All-Star Grand Resbak spin-off of the program and finished in third place.

Performances on Tawag ng Tanghalan season 2
| Round | Theme | Song | Original artist | Order | Original air date | Result |
|---|---|---|---|---|---|---|
| Daily Elimination Round | —N/a | "Wildflower" | Arnel Pineda | 3 | November 14, 2017 | Won as daily winner |
| Face-off Round | —N/a | "I (Who Have Nothing)" (vs. Wilfredo Duga-duga) | Shirley Bassey | 4 | November 14, 2017 | Defending champion |
| Face-off Round | —N/a | "Careless Whisper" (vs. Rosana Briones) | George Michael | 5 | November 15, 2017 | Defending champion |
| Face-off Round | —N/a | "It's Man's Man's World" (vs. Mark Barican) | Renée Geyer | 5 | November 16, 2017 | Defending champion |
| Face-off Round | —N/a | "Feelin' Good" (vs. Honey Roche) | Michael Bublé | 5 | November 17, 2017 | Defending champion |
| Face-off Round | —N/a | "Superstar" (vs. Mary Joyce Belen) | The Carpenters | 5 | November 18, 2017 | Defending Champion (qualified for the Semifinals) |
| Face-off Round | —N/a | "Anak" (vs. Mico Mauleon) | Freddie Aguilar | 5 | November 20, 2017 | Defending Champion |
| Face-off Round | —N/a | "When We Were Young" (vs. Tuko Delos Reyes) | Adele | 5 | November 21, 2017 | Lost (advanced to the Semifinals) |
| Live Semifinals | "Audition Song" | "I Who Have Nothing" | Shirley Bassey | 2 | January 29, 2018 | Top 4, safe |
| Live Semifinals | "Musical Influence" | "Superstition" | Stevie Wonder | | January 30, 2018 | Safe |
| Live Semifinals | "Fight Song" | "Who You Are" | Jessie J | | January 31, 2018 | Top 4, safe |
| Live Semifinals | "Song for their Families" | "Just Once" | James Ingram | 3 | February 1, 2018 | Safe |
| Live Semifinals | "Judges' Choice" | "I Can't Make You Love Me" | Bonnie Raitt | 6 | February 2, 2018 | Safe |
| Live Semifinals | "Semifinal Song" | "Perfect" | Ed Sheeran | 2 | February 3, 2018 | 2nd highest score; Advanced to the Finals |
| Live Finals (Top 12) | "Homecoming Song" | "Skyfall" | Adele | 4 | May 28, 2018 | Safe |
| Live Finals (Top 12) | "Fight Song" | “Solitaire” | The Carpenters | 4 | May 30, 2018 | Safe |
| Live Finals (Top 12) | "Fast and Groovy Song" | “Treasure” | Bruno Mars | 5 | May 31, 2018 | Safe |
| Live Finals (Top 12) | "Now or never song" | “Let It Be” | The Beatles | 2 | June 1, 2018 | 7th place, eliminated |

After his stint on the show, the program tapped Vasquez to become a vocal coach.

=== 2024–present: The Voice ===
Performances on The Voice season 26
| Round | Theme | Song | Original artist | Order | Original air date | Result |
|---|---|---|---|---|---|---|
| Blind Auditions | —N/a | "I'm Goin' Down" | Mary J. Blige | 1.2 | September 23, 2024 | Michael Bublé, Gwen Stefani, Reba McEntire, and Snoop Dogg turned; joined Team Bublé |
| Battles (Top 56) | —N/a | "The Power of Love" (vs. Aliyah Khaylyn) | Celine Dion | 10.4 | October 29, 2024 | Saved by Michael Bublé |
| Knockouts (Top 36) | —N/a | "You Don't Have to Say You Love Me" (vs. Kiara Vega and Jeremy Beloate) | Dusty Springfield | 14.5 | November 18, 2024 | Saved by Michael Bublé |
| Playoffs (Top 20) | —N/a | "Crying" | Roy Orbison | 17.5 | November 26, 2024 | Saved by Michael Bublé |
| Live Semi-finals (Top 8) | —N/a | "If I Can Dream" | Elvis Presley | 18.12 | December 2, 2024 | Saved by Public |
| Live Finale (Final 5) | "Uptempo Song" | "Unstoppable" | Sia | 20.5 | December 9, 2024 | Winner |
| Live Finale (Final 5) | "Ballad" | "A Million Dreams" | The Greatest Showman cast | 20.8 | December 9, 2024 | Winner |
| Live Finale (Final 5) | "Duet with Coach" | "Who's Lovin' You" (Duet with Michael Bublé) | Jackson 5 | 22.15 | December 10, 2024 | Winner |

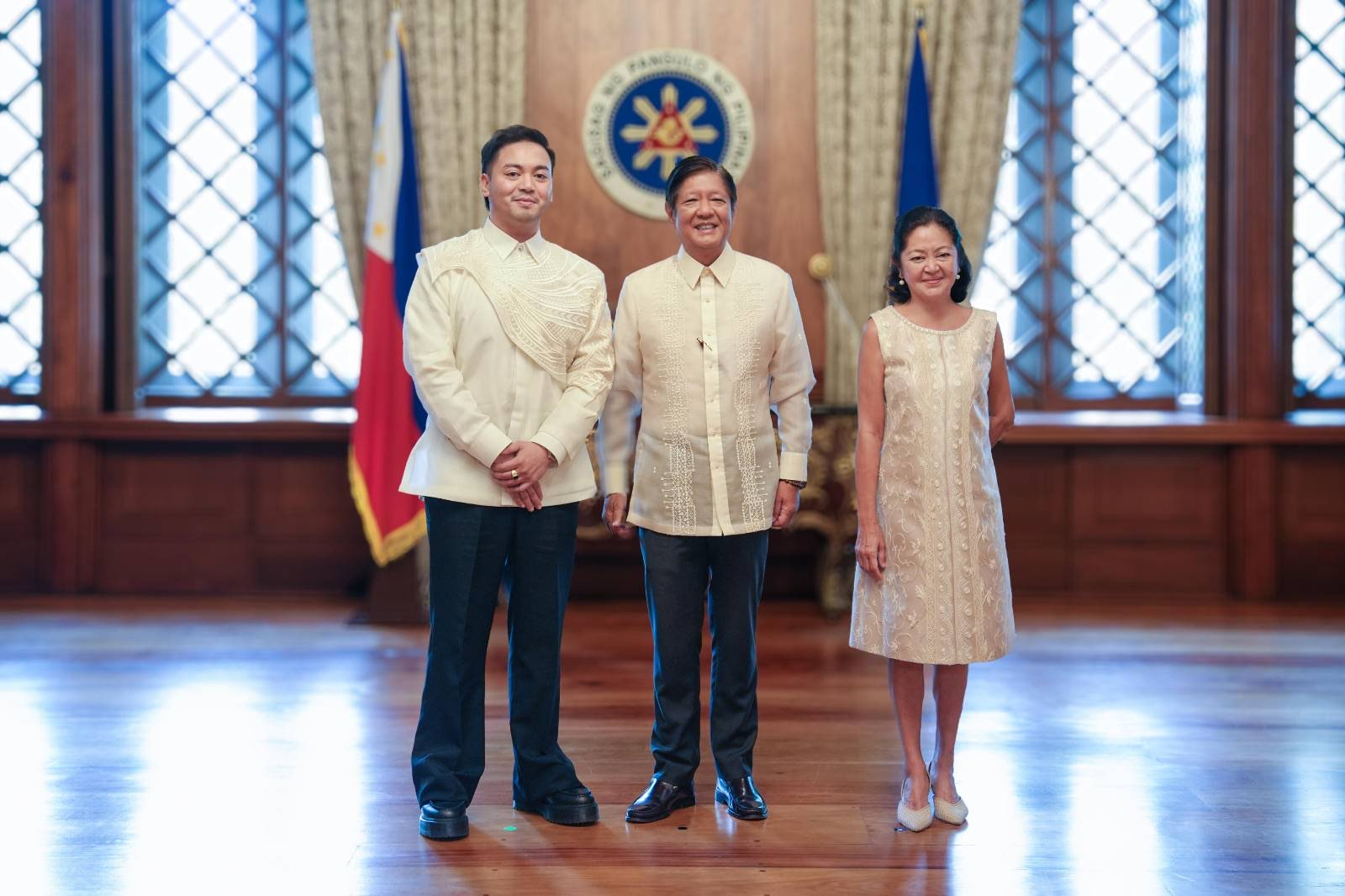
President Bongbong Marcos and First Lady Liza Araneta Marcos meet with Sofronio Vasquez in Malacañang on January 8, 2025

In 2024, Vasquez auditioned for the 26th season of The Voice USA. All four coaches (Michael Bublé, Gwen Stefani, Reba McEntire, and Snoop Dogg) expressed interest in working with him. Vasquez ultimately chose to be a part of Team Bublé. He progressed to the live finale held on December 10, 2024, where he won, becoming the first male Asian winner in the show's run, as well as the first Filipino to win. Vasquez won US$100,000 and a recording contract with Universal Music Group.

Upon his return to the Philippines, Vasquez paid a courtesy call to the Malacañang Palace on January 8, 2025, performing for Philippine president Bongbong Marcos and first lady Liza Araneta Marcos. Vasquez held his debut solo concert on January 18, at the Waterfront Cebu City Hotel and Casino in Cebu City, in conjunction with the Sinulog Festival. On January 20, Senator Joel Villanueva, along with the consolidated resolutions from Senator Imee Marcos and Senate President Pro Tempore Jinggoy Estrada, unanimously adopted Senate Resolution No. 1259 in honor of Vasquez.

In March 2025, Vasquez signed with Star Magic for his activities in the Philippines. He sang the national anthem, "Lupang Hinirang, at the fourth State of the Nation Address of President Bongbong Marcos on July 28.

In December 2025, Vasquez returned for season 28 of The Voice finale for a new single "Superman".

== Filmography ==
=== Television ===
| Year | Title | Role |
|---|---|---|
| 2016 | Tawag ng Tanghalan season 1 | Contestant |
| 2017 | Tawag ng Tanghalan season 2 | Contestant / Finalist |
| 2019 | Tawag ng Tanghalan: All-Star Grand Resbak season 1 | Contestant / Third Placer |
| 2024 | The Voice (American TV series) season 26 | Contestant / Winner |
| 2026 | Your Face Sounds Familiar (season 4) | Round 11 Guest Performer as Elvis Presley |
| 2026 | Rainbow Rumble | Contestant |
| 2026 | Drag Race Philippines (season 4, episode 1) | Guest Judge |

Awards and achievements
| Preceded by Asher HaVon | The Voice (American); Winner; 2024 (Fall) | Succeeded by Adam David |
| Preceded by "Last Dance" | The Voice (American); Winner's song "Unstoppable"; 2024 (Fall) | Succeeded by "Hard Fought Hallelujah" |
