= Heartbeat (Jeremy Rosado album) =

Studio album by Jeremy Rosado
- Released: August 28, 2015
- Genre: Christian pop
- Length: 41:52
- Label: Save the City

Heartbeat is the first studio album from singer Jeremy Rosado. Save the City Records released the album on August 28, 2015.

== Critical reception ==
Professional ratings
Review scores
Source	Rating
365 Days of Inspiring Media	4/5 stars
New Release Today	3.5/5 stars

Awarding the album three and a half stars for New Release Today, Jonathan Brassington states, "Heartbeat ... speaks volumes to the listener about a plethora of different topics. Upbeat, yet authentic, Rosado shows his sincerity by addressing his own life experiences through his songs...The wide range of sound and messages can cause a bit of inconsistency for the album as a whole. But if you are looking for stand-alone songs that uplift and encourage, this album was made for you to enjoy." Joshua Andre, giving the album four stars at 365 Days of Inspiring Media, writes, "Wearing his heart on his sleeve with his authenticity and transparency, Jeremy’s debut offering of 12 songs, sung in a variety and slew of musical genres, is deserving of many listens as we are presented with a man on fire for Jesus, unashamed of the gospel, declaring His love and devotion for Jesus and drawing people to Christ in his unique, vibrant, honest and heartfelt way."

== Track listing ==
No.	Title	Writer(s)	Length
1.	"Burning Lights (That Kind of Love)"	Luke Joseph Buishas, Aaron Charles Rice, Jeremy German Rosado	3:35
2.	"Speed of Love" (featuring Canon)	Aaron McCain, Rice, Rosado, Samuel Anton Tinnesz	3:26
3.	"Heartbeat"	Nick Baumhardt, Rice, Rosado	3:25
4.	"Innocent"	Justin Ebach, Rice, Rosado	3:15
5.	"For Real"	Justin Douglas Morgan, Rice, Rosado	3:02
6.	"No Ordinary Moments"	Rice, Rosado, James Andrew Thiele	3:31
7.	"Clean"	Rice, Rosado, James Tealy	3:16
8.	"What It Means to Say" (featuring Blanca)	Michael Farren, Rice, Rosado	3:57
9.	"The Other Side"	Jason Bare, Rice, Rosado	4:17
10.	"You and Me Jesus"	Buishas, Rice, Rosado	3:09
11.	"Brand New"	Gabriel Patillo, Rice, Rosado	3:17
12.	"Leave the Light On"	Chuck Butler, Rice, Rosado	3:42
Total length:			41:52
