= Philadelphia Welcome America Festival =

Annual series of celebrations leading up to Independence Day

The Philadelphia Welcome America Festival is an annual series of celebrations leading up to Independence Day, held in Philadelphia, Pennsylvania. It is currently sponsored by convenience store chain Wawa. Coverage of events on July 4 airs on NBC Channel 10 & Telemundo Canal 62.

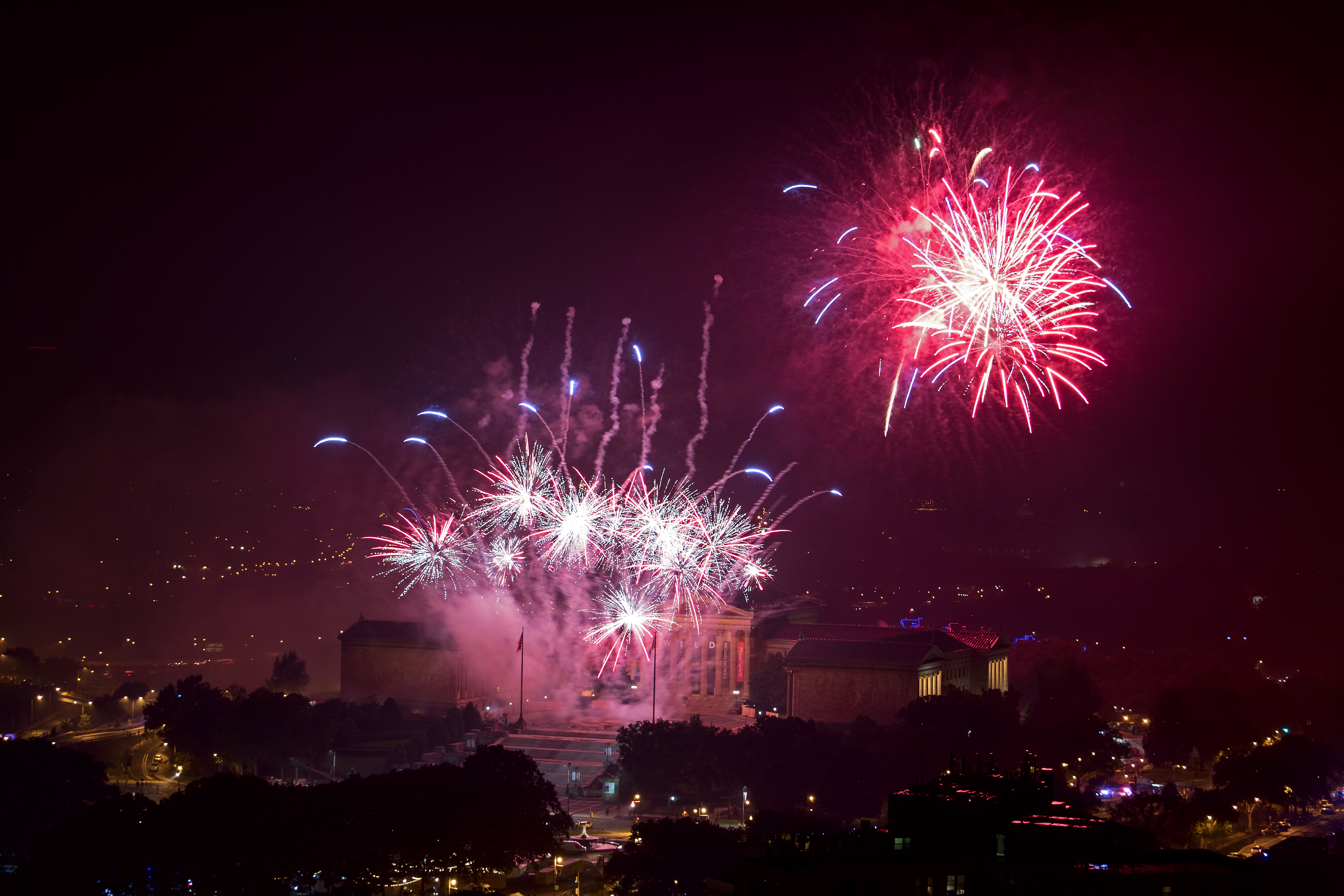
Fireworks over the Art Museum as the Welcome America Festival wrapped up in 2017

The 16-day festival features multicultural and multigenerational events, including free concerts, fireworks displays, block parties, a parade, and educational activities.

== History ==
Philadelphia's main Independence Day celebration was started in 1993 by Welcome America, Inc., a non-profit organization. The first event highlighted the opening of the Pennsylvania Convention Center. The series of events have relied heavily on corporate sponsorship, which enables the organization to keep all of the events free to attend.

In 1995, Sunoco became a title sponsor of the event, and it was referred to as Sunoco Welcome America!. The company continued as the main sponsor until 2010, when Wawa paid $3 million to be the sponsor for the following three years. Wawa has continued as the title sponsor through 2023.

In May of 2020, Wawa Welcome America organizers announced that the festival would be a virtual experience due to the COVID-19 pandemic.

In 2021, the Wawa Welcome America festival officially extended its programming from 6-days to 16-days of celebrating, starting on Juneteenth and ending on the Fourth of July.

There was a shooting of two policemen in 2022 between the end of the concert and the start of the fireworks. This caused widespread panic for thousands of attendees due to both the rise in mass shootings in the United States and the Highland Park parade shooting happening earlier in the day.

== July 4th Concert and fireworks ==
Every year a free outdoor concert is held on the Benjamin Franklin Parkway in front of the Philadelphia Museum of Art. The concert is followed by fireworks. The free live performance has been a Philadelphia tradition for more than two decades. Past performers have included notable hometown acts and top-selling artists. In 2013, the concert was broadcast nationally on VH1, in addition to local network broadcast by NBC10.

2026 Christina Aguilera, Jill Scott, Seal, Infinity Song, and The Roots with special guests Will Smith, DJ Jazzy Jeff, Kathy Sledge, and State Property
2025 LL Cool J, Jazmine Sullivan, Jojo, Álvaro Díaz
2024 Kesha, Ne-Yo
2023 Demi Lovato, Ludacris
2022 Ava Max, Jason Derulo, Tori Kelly
2021 Cam Anthony, Bebe Rexha, Flo Rida
2020 Camila Cabello virtually, due to the COVID-19 pandemic in Philadelphia.
2019 Jennifer Hudson, Meghan Trainor
2018 Pitbull
2017 Mary J. Blige, Boyz II Men, Mandy Gonzalez, Tony DeSare
2016 Leon Bridges along with Leslie Odom Jr., Yazz The Greatest, The O'Jays, and a Gamble and Huff tribute.
2015 The Roots along with Jennifer Nettles, Miguel, MKTO and Zella Day.
2014 Pop stars Nicki Minaj, Ed Sheeran, Ariana Grande, Aloe Blacc, Jennifer Hudson, and The Voice finalist Vicci Martinez joined The Roots on stage.
2013 The Roots and special guests included John Mayer, Ne-Yo, Jill Scott, and host comedian Kevin Hart.
2012 The Roots and special guests Daryl Hall, Queen Latifah, Common, Lauryn Hill, and Joe Jonas.
2011 The Roots and special guests Earth Wind & Fire, Michael McDonald, Estelle, Sara Bareilles, DJ Jazzy Jeff, Aaron Neville and Gerald Veasley.
2010 The Roots and The Goo Goo Dolls
2009 Sheryl Crow and The Roots
2008 John Legend, an alumnus of Philadelphia-based University of Pennsylvania
2007 Hall & Oates
2006 Lionel Richie and Fantasia
2005 Elton John and Patti LaBelle
2004 The Isley Brothers
2003 Musiq and Peter Frampton
2002 Brian McKnight and The Baha Men
2001 Garth Brooks
2000 Earth, Wind & Fire
1999 Dionne Warwick
1998 Boyz II Men
1997 Ray Charles
1996 Patti LaBelle
1995 The Beach Boys
1994 Smokey Robinson, Peter Nero, and The Philly Pops
1993 The Pointer Sisters and The Philly Pops
