= The Voice (American TV series) season 21 =

The Voice
- Season 21
- Promotional poster featuring coaches Legend, Grande, Shelton, and Clarkson
- Hosted by: Carson Daly
- Coaches: Kelly Clarkson; John Legend; Ariana Grande; Blake Shelton
- No. of contestants: 48 artists
- Winner: Girl Named Tom
- Winning coach: Kelly Clarkson
- Runner-up: Wendy Moten
- No. of episodes: 26

Release
- Original network: NBC
- Original release: September 20 – December 14, 2021

Season chronology
- ← Previous; Season 20 Next → Season 22

The twenty-first season of the American reality television series The Voice premiered on September 20, 2021, on NBC. Blake Shelton, Kelly Clarkson and John Legend returned as coaches for their twenty-first, eighth, and sixth seasons, respectively. Ariana Grande made her first appearance as a coach this season, replacing Nick Jonas. Meanwhile, Carson Daly returned for his twenty-first season as host.

Girl Named Tom, consisting of siblings Bekah, Caleb, and Joshua Liechty, was named the winner of the season, marking Kelly Clarkson's fourth win as a coach; the first instance of a group act winning the show; and the second time that the first (aired) act to audition would go on to win the entire season, following Todd Tilghman's win in season 18. Additionally, with Wendy Moten being named the runner-up, she is the oldest finalist in the show's run, and (until Alexia Jayy's victory in season 29) the highest-placing African-American female singer, along with Toneisha Harris (also from season 18), in the show's history.

The 21st season was also notable when Sasha Allen of Jim & Sasha Allen not only became the American version’s third openly transgender artist (after season 14's Angel Bonilla and season 17's Dane Mautone of Dane & Stephanie) and second transgender male to turn a chair on the show, but also became the American version's first transgender artist to have progressed to the Live shows.

This is also the last season to have studio versions of performances.

== Panelists ==
=== Coaches and host ===
In March 2021, NBC announced there would be a change in the coaches for this season. Blake Shelton, Kelly Clarkson, and John Legend all returned for their twenty-first, eighth, and sixth seasons, respectively, with Ariana Grande making her first appearance as a coach in this season. Carson Daly returned for his twenty-first season as the host.

Coaches and Host of The Voice Season 21

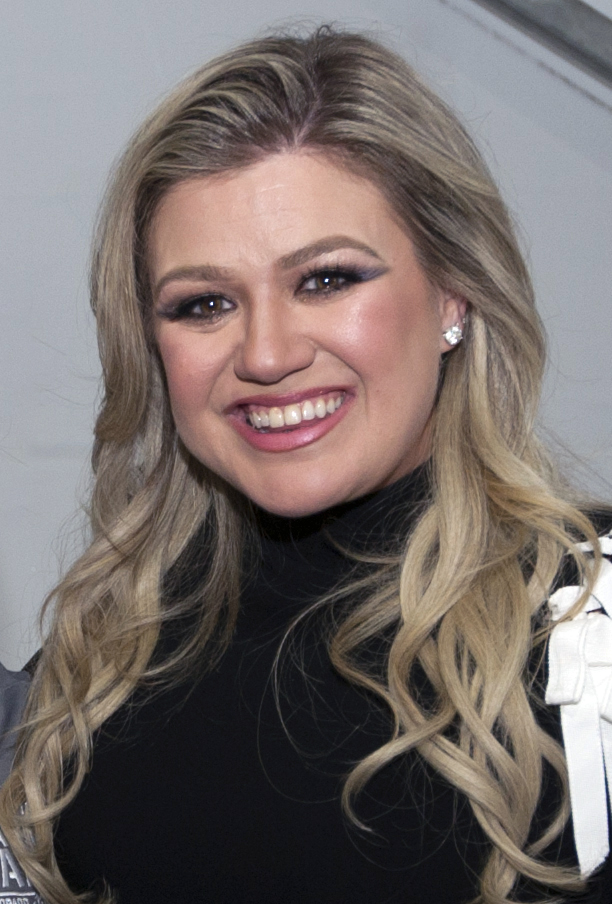
Kelly Clarkson

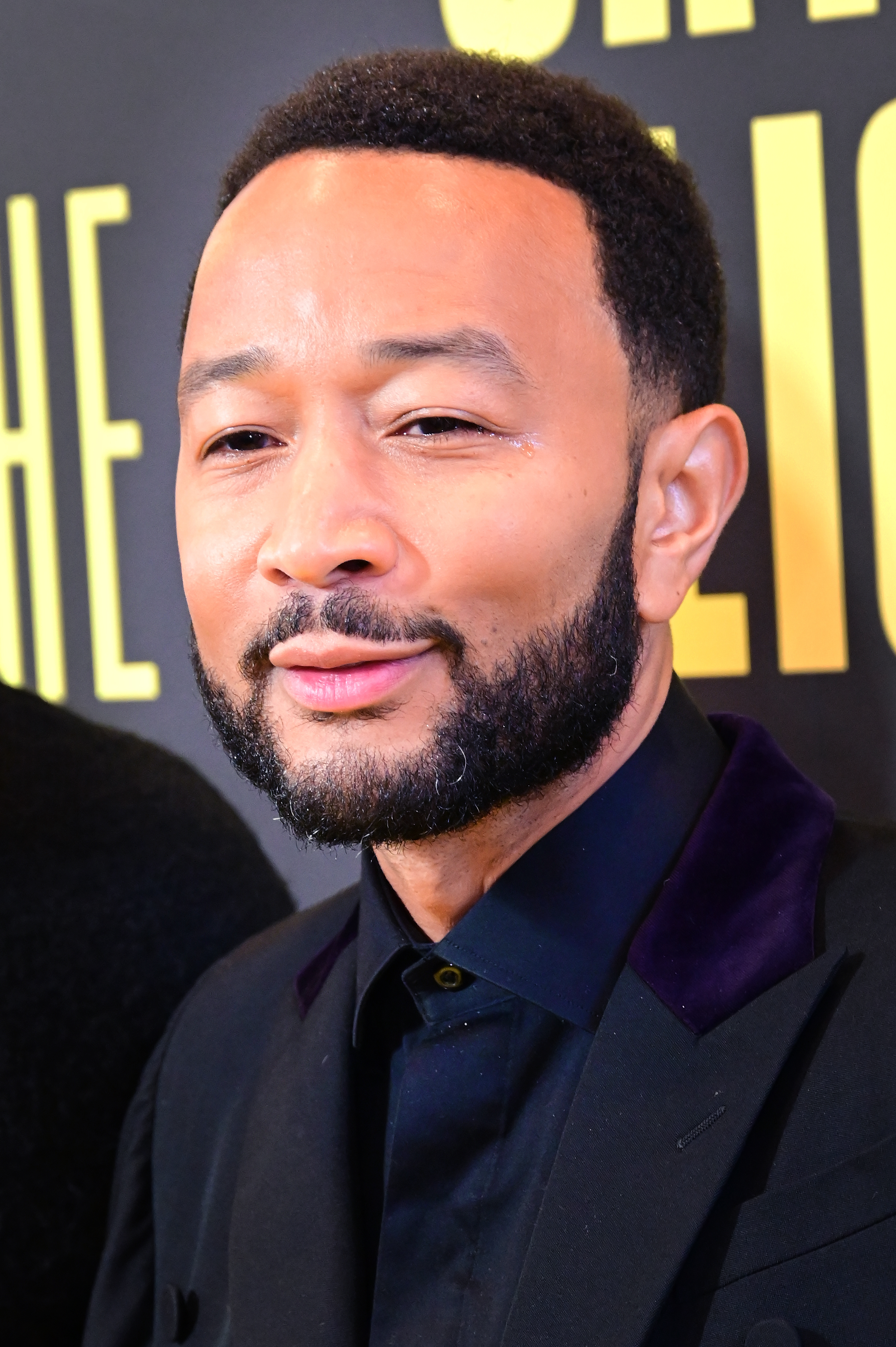
John Legend

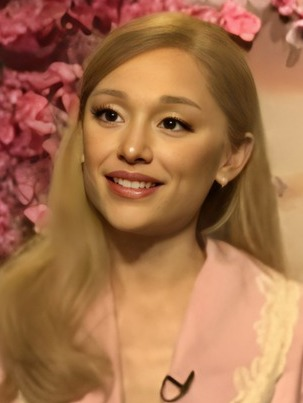
Ariana Grande

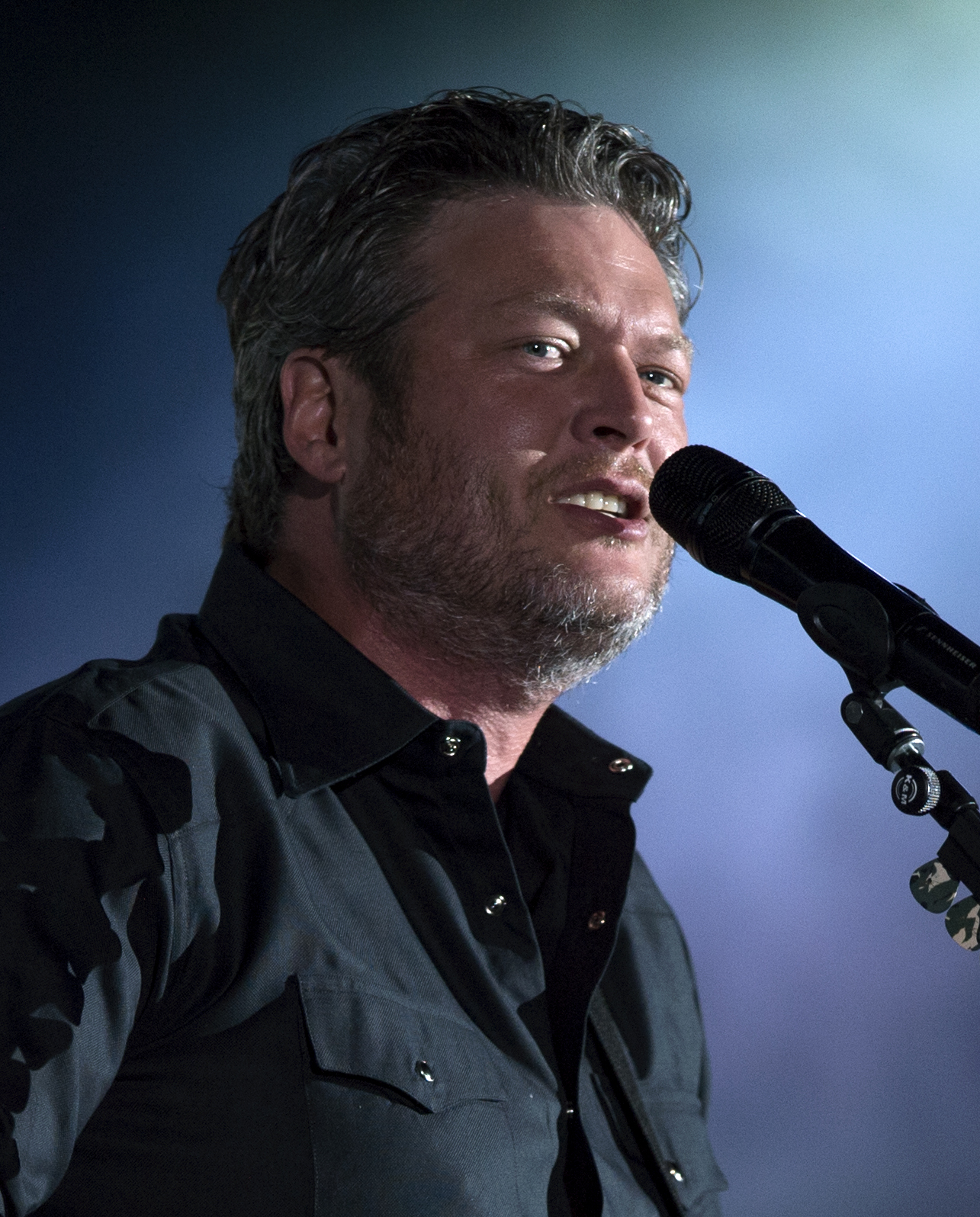
Blake Shelton

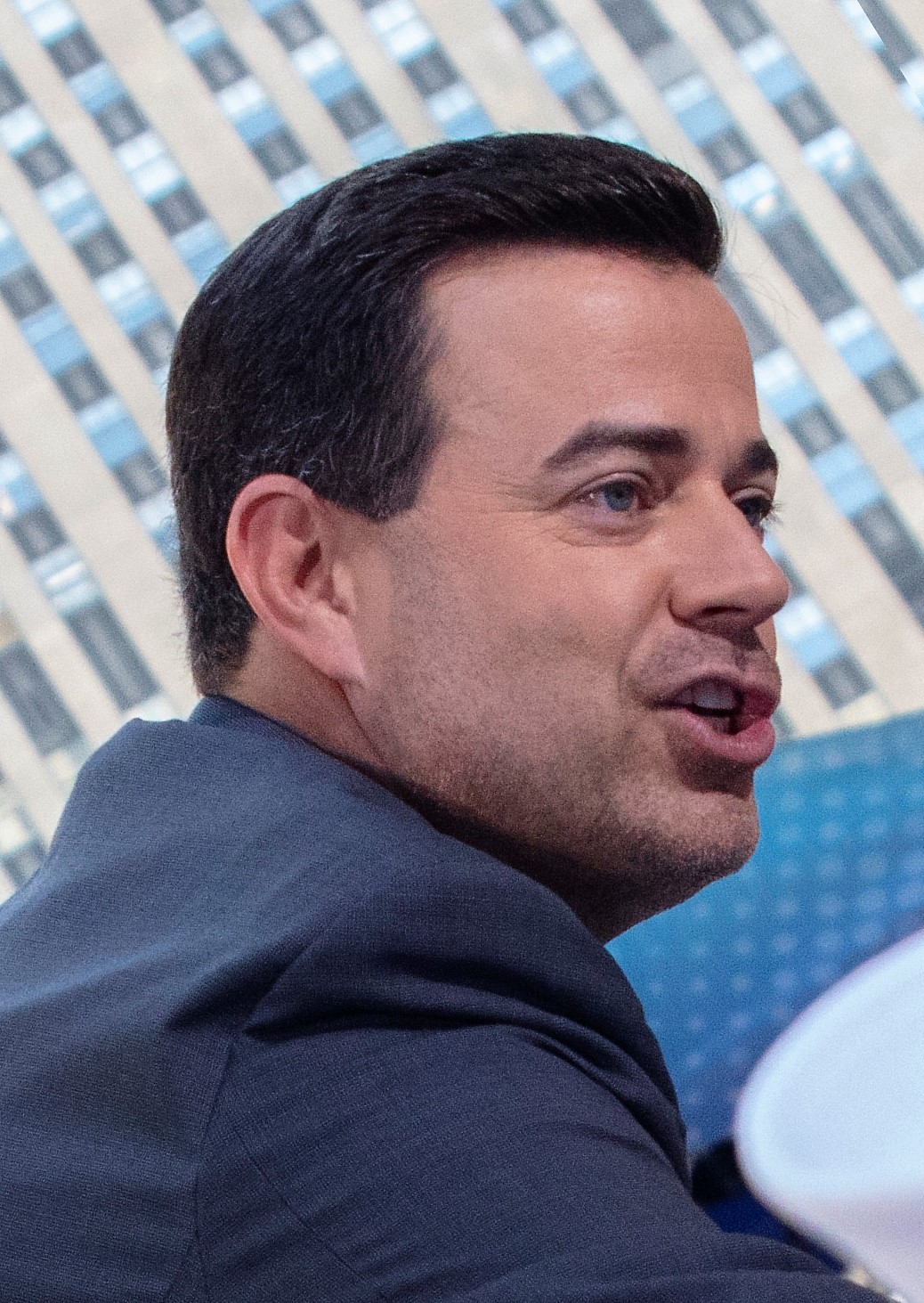
Carson Daly

=== Advisors ===
In August 2021, the advisors for the Battles were revealed, who were: Jason Aldean for Team Kelly, Camila Cabello for Team Legend, Kristin Chenoweth for Team Ariana and Dierks Bentley for Team Blake.

=== Mega mentor ===
Ed Sheeran serves as the mega mentor for this season during the Knockouts. He was previously a Battle advisor for Team Christina in season 5.

=== Promotion ===
Shortly prior to the season premiere (on September 17, 2021), the blind audition of Vaughn Mugol, performing Ed Sheeran's The A Team, was released online. Later episodes saw the auditions of Gymani, Carson Peters, Bella DeNapoli, BrittneyBree, and Aaron Hines released online as a sneak peak for their respective episodes.

== Teams ==
Teams color key
Winner	Eliminated in the Live playoffs
Runner-up	Eliminated but named for the Voice Comeback
Third place	Stolen in the Knockouts round
Fourth place	Eliminated in the Knockouts round
Fifth place	Stolen in the Battles round
Eliminated in the Live shows	Eliminated in the Battles round

Coaching teams
Coach	Top 48 Artists				
Kelly Clarkson					
Kelly Clarkson	Girl Named Tom	Hailey Mia	Jeremy Rosado	Gymani	Katie Rae
Kelly Clarkson	Aaron Hines	~~Holly Forbes~~	Xavier Cornell	The Cunningham Sisters	Kinsey Rose
Kelly Clarkson	~~Jershika Maple~~	Carolina Alonso	Parker McKay	Wyatt Michael	
John Legend					
John Legend	Jershika Maple	Joshua Vacanti	Shadale	Samuel Harness	David Vogel
John Legend	Samara Brown	~~Paris Winningham~~	BrittanyBree	Sabrina Dias	~~Jonathan Mouton~~
John Legend	Janora Brown	Keilah Grace	KJ Jennings	Jack Rogan	
Ariana Grande					
Ariana Grande	Jim & Sasha Allen	Holly Forbes	Ryleigh Plank	Bella DeNapoli	Vaughn Mugol
Ariana Grande	Raquel Trinidad	~~Katie Rae~~	~~David Vogel~~	Manny Keith	Katherine Ann Mohler
Ariana Grande	~~Hailey Mia~~	Sophia Bromberg	KCK3	Chavon Rodgers	
Blake Shelton					
Blake Shelton	Wendy Moten	Paris Winningham	Lana Scott	Peedy Chavis	Libianca
Blake Shelton	Hailey Green	Berritt Haynes	Jonathan Mouton	Carson Peters	~~Manny Keith~~
Blake Shelton	Tommy Edwards	Clint Sherman	The Joy Reunion	Kaitlyn Velez	
Note: Italicized names are stolen artists (names struck through within former teams). Underlined names are artists saved by his/her coach. Bold name is the Voice Comeback winner.

== Blind auditions ==
The blind auditions began airing on September 20, 2021. In each audition, an artist sings their piece in front of the coaches whose chairs are facing the audience. If a coach is interested to work with the artist, they will press their button to face the artist. If a singular coach presses the button, the artist automatically becomes part of their team. If multiple coaches turn, they will compete for the artist, who will decide which team they will join. Each coach has one "block" to prevent another coach from getting an artist, with only one block permitted to be used per blind audition. Each coach ends up with 12 artists by the end of the blind auditions, creating a total of 48 artists advancing to the battles.

The coaches performed a mash-up of "Hold On, I'm Comin'" (John Legend & Blake Shelton) and "Respect" (Kelly Clarkson & Ariana Grande) at the start of the show's premiere episode.

This is the first instance that a debuting coach (Ariana Grande) does not have any four-chair turns on their team, as Shakira, Usher, Gwen Stefani, Pharrell Williams, Miley Cyrus, Alicia Keys, Jennifer Hudson, Kelly Clarkson, John Legend, and Nick Jonas received at least one four-chair turn contestants on their teams during their respective debut season.

Blind auditions color key
✔	Coach hit his/her "I WANT YOU" button
	Artist defaulted to this coach's team
	Artist selected to join this coach's team
	Artist was eliminated with no coach pressing their button
✘	Coach pressed "I WANT YOU" button, but was blocked by another coach from getting the artist
	Blocked by Kelly; Blocked by John; Blocked by Ariana; Blocked by Blake

=== Episode 1 (September 20) ===
Among the contestants in this episode were Jonathan Mouton, who previously competed on an episode of I Can See Your Voice; and Katherine Ann Mohler, who previously competed on the eleventh season of America's Got Talent as part of the vocal group OneVoice, until their elimination in the Judge Cuts.

First blind auditions results
Order	Artist	Age	Hometown	Song	Coach's and artist's choices			
Order	Artist	Age	Hometown	Song	Kelly	John	Ariana	Blake
1	Girl Named Tom (Joshua, Bekah Grace, and Caleb Liechty)	20–26	Pettisville, Ohio	"Helplessly Hoping"	✔	✔	✔	✔
2	Katie Rae	35	Sacramento, California	"The Bones"	✔	✔	✔	–
3	Peedy Chavis	19	Lawrenceville, Georgia	"Heartbreak Hotel"	–	✔	–	✔
4	Jonathan Mouton	30	Los Angeles, California	"Leave the Door Open"	–	✔	✔	–
5	Marco Salvador	15	Miami, Florida	"Bailamos"	–	–	–	–
6	Katherine Ann Mohler	22	Memphis, Tennessee	"We Don't Have to Take Our Clothes Off"	–	–	✔	✔
7	Jack Rogan	18	Rochester, New York	"The House of the Rising Sun"	✔	✔	–	–
8	Kinsey Rose	35	Louisville, KY / Nashville, TN	"Cowboy Take Me Away"	✔	–	–	✘
9	Vaughn Mugol	27	Laguna, Philippines / Beaumont, TX	"The A Team"	✔	✔	✔	–
10	Gracie Nourbash	18	Glenview, Illinois	"Control"	–	–	–	–
11	Wendy Moten	56	Memphis, Tennessee	"We Can Work It Out"	✔	✘	✔	✔

=== Episode 2 (Sept. 21) ===
Among the contestants in this episode was Hailey Green, who previously auditioned unsuccessfully in season 19.

Second blind auditions results
Order	Artist	Age	Hometown	Song	Coach's and artist's choices			
Order	Artist	Age	Hometown	Song	Kelly	John	Ariana	Blake
1	Lana Scott	28	Chesapeake, Virginia	"Hole in the Bottle"	✔	–	–	✔
2	Samuel Harness	26	Fort Wayne, Indiana	"Here Without You"	–	✔	✔	✔
3	Carolina Alonso	23	Reno, Nevada	"El Triste"	✔	–	–	–
4	Chavon Rodgers	23	Ada / Tulsa, Oklahoma	"Drivers License"	–	✔	✔	–
5	Serenity Arce	14	Jupiter, Florida	"I See Red"	–	–	–	–
6	Joshua Vacanti	28	Lockport, New York	"Into the Unknown"	–	✔	✘	–
7	Hailey Green	15	St. Martin, Mississippi	"Home"	–	–	–	✔
8	Jim & Sasha Allen	57 & 19	Newtown, Connecticut	"Leaving on a Jet Plane"	✔	–	✔	–
9	Paris Winningham	32	Jacksonville, Florida	"Superstition"	–	✔	✔	–
10	Camryn B (Camryn Brooks)	21	Mount Shasta, California	"Hometown Glory"	–	–	–	–
11	Gymani (Brandy Rhodes)	23	East Point, Georgia	"POV"	✔	✔	✔	✔

=== Episode 3 (Sept. 27) ===
Among this episode's auditionees were Jeremy Rosado and Raquel Trinidad, who previously competed on the eleventh and seventeenth seasons of American Idol; respectively, Carson Peters, who previously appeared on season 1 of Little Big Shots; and Samara Brown, the sister of The Voice season 3 contestant Amanda Brown.

Third blind auditions results
Order	Artist	Age	Hometown	Song	Coach's and artist's choices			
Order	Artist	Age	Hometown	Song	Kelly	John	Ariana	Blake
1	Raquel Trinidad	23	Tampa, Florida	"I Wish"	✔	✔	✔	–
2	The Joy Reunion (Rob Easley, Gentry Monreal, and Neil Morrison)	39–42	Redlands, California	"Boondocks"	–	✔	–	✔
3	Jasmine Mills	28	Springfield, Virginia	"It's So Hard to Say Goodbye to Yesterday"	–	–	–	–
4	Hailey Mia	13	Clifton, New Jersey	"You Broke Me First"	✔	–	✔	–
5	Jeremy Rosado	29	Tampa, Florida	"Here Comes Goodbye"	✔	–	–	✔
6	Carson Peters	17	Piney Flats, Tennessee	"Tulsa Time"	✔	✔	✔	✔
7	Keilah Grace	15	New York City, New York	"Never Tear Us Apart"	✔	✔	✔	–
8	Bubba (Imad Elbaneh)	26	Buffalo, New York	"How Am I Supposed to Live Without You"	–	–	–	–
9	Samara Brown	32	The Bronx, New York	"Sweet Thing"	–	✔	✔	–
10	Lucas O'Reilly	20	Newport, Rhode Island	"Carolina in My Mind"	–	–	–	–
11	Holly Forbes	30	Catlettsburg, Kentucky	"Rocket Man"	✔	✘	✔	✔

=== Episode 4 (Sept. 28) ===
Fourth blind auditions results
Order	Artist	Age	Hometown	Song	Coach's and artist's choices			
Order	Artist	Age	Hometown	Song	Kelly	John	Ariana	Blake
1	Bella DeNapoli	22	West Islip, New York	"Damaged"	✔	✔	✔	–
2	David Vogel	23	Valhalla, New York	"Breathin"	–	–	✔	–
3	Janora Brown	22	Wingate, North Carolina	"Angel of Mine"	✔	✔	–	–
4	Kaitlyn Velez	21	Copiague, New York	"Please Don't Go"	–	✔	–	✔
5	Berritt Haynes	19	Pell City, Alabama	"Mercy"	–	–	–	✔
6	Clint Sherman	25	Heath, Texas	"Brown Eyed Girl"	–	–	–	✔
7	Kayla Lilly	22	Quarryville, Pennsylvania	"Never Enough"	–	–	–	–
8	The Cunningham Sisters (Macie and Marie Cunningham)	15 & 14	Hamilton, Ohio	"Never Alone"	✔	✔	–	–

=== Episode 5 (October 4) ===
Among this episode's auditionees was Austin Percario, who previously competed on the thirteenth season of American Idol.

Fifth blind auditions results
Order	Artist	Age	Hometown	Song	Coach's and artist's choices			
Order	Artist	Age	Hometown	Song	Kelly	John	Ariana	Blake
1	Ryleigh Plank	20	Fort Myers, Florida	"Anyone"	✔	–	✔	–
2	Jershika Maple	24	Killeen, Texas	"Can You Stand the Rain"	✔	✔	–	–
3	Manny Keith	31	Miami, Florida	"Break My Heart"	–	–	–	✔
4	Austin Percario	25	Los Angeles, California	"This Town"	–	–	–	–
5	KJ Jennings	21	Austin, Texas	"Put Your Records On"	–	✔	–	✔
6	Sabrina Dias	26	Newark, New Jersey	"The Girl From Ipanema"	–	✔	–	–
7	Xavier Cornell	17	Los Angeles, California	"Teenage Dream"	✔	–	–	–
8	Libianca (Libianca Kenzonkinboum Fonji)	20	Minneapolis, Minnesota	"Good Days"	–	–	✔	✔
9	Jared Brasher	26	Huntsville, Alabama	"Drunk on Your Love"	–	–	–	–
10	Sophia Bromberg	16	San Rafael, California	"Heather"	✔	✔	✔	–
11	Wyatt Michael	24	Fredericksburg, Virginia	"Mack the Knife"	✔	–	✔	–
12	Alexandra Stojack	20	Cincinnati, Ohio	"The Way I Am"	–	–	–	–
13	BrittanyBree (Brittany Black)	26	Dallas, Texas	"Call Out My Name"	✔	✔	✔	✔

=== Episode 6 (October 5) ===
Sixth blind auditions results
Order	Artist	Age	Hometown	Song	Coach's and artist's choices			
Order	Artist	Age	Hometown	Song	Kelly	John	Ariana	Blake
1	Aaron Hines	28	Charleston, South Carolina	"Heartbreak Anniversary"	✔	✔	✔	✔
2	KCK3 (Kaitlynn, Chelsea, and Kyla Keller)	17–26	Brandon, Mississippi	"no tears left to cry"	–	–	✔	–
3	Tommy Edwards	27	Bigfork, Montana	"Drops of Jupiter (Tell Me)"	–	✔	Team full	✔
4	Shadale (Shadale Johnson)	29	Douglasville, Georgia	"That's What I Like"	✔	✔	Team full	Team full
5	Joe McGuinness	43	Atlanta, Georgia	"Midnight Rider"	–	Team full	Team full	Team full
6	Parker McKay	30	Pittsburgh, Pennsylvania	"Slow Hands"	✔	Team full	Team full	Team full

== Battles ==
The battles began airing on October 11, 2021. The advisors for this round were Jason Aldean for Team Kelly, Camila Cabello for Team Legend, Kristin Chenoweth for Team Ariana, and Dierks Bentley for Team Blake.

In this round, the coaches pit two of their artists in a singing match and then select one of them to advance to the next round. Losing artists may be "stolen" by another coach, becoming new members of their team; or can be saved by their coach, remaining a part of their original team.

Multiple coaches can attempt to steal an artist, resulting in a competition for the artist, who will ultimately decide which team they will go to. Additionally, their original coach can compete for their artist if they attempt to save them.

There was no four-way knockout round in this season, meaning that saved artists (Kinsey Rose, Bella DeNapoli, Samara Brown, Lana Scott) advanced to the regular Knockout rounds.

At the end of this round, eight artists remained on each team; six were the battle winners, with one from a steal and a save, respectively. In total, 32 artists advanced to the knockouts.

It was revealed that, for the Live Playoffs Wildcard, one previously eliminated artist from each team had the chance to be voted via Twitter to earn a place in the Top 13 (see Voice Comeback).

Battles color key
Artist won the Battle and advanced to the Knockouts
Artist lost the Battle, but was stolen by another coach, and, advanced to the Knockouts
Artist lost the Battle, but was saved by their coach, and, advanced to Knockouts
Artist lost the Battle and was eliminated
Artist lost the Battle and was eliminated, but participated in the Voice Comeback

Battles results
Episode	Coach	Order	Winner	Song	Loser	'Steal'/'Save' result			
Episode	Coach	Order	Winner	Song	Loser	Kelly	John	Ariana	Blake
Episode 7 (Monday, October 11, 2021)	Ariana	1	Katie Rae	"No More Tears (Enough Is Enough)"	Bella DeNapoli	–	–	✔	–
Episode 7 (Monday, October 11, 2021)	John	2	Samuel Harness	"I Know What You Did Last Summer"	KJ Jennings	–	–	–	–
Episode 7 (Monday, October 11, 2021)	Kelly	3	Girl Named Tom	"Seven Bridges Road"	Kinsey Rose	✔	✔	✔	✔
Episode 7 (Monday, October 11, 2021)	Blake	4	Peedy Chavis	"Joy to the World"	The Joy Reunion	–	–	–	–
Episode 7 (Monday, October 11, 2021)	Ariana	5	David Vogel	"Sugar, We're Goin Down"	Chavon Rodgers	–	–	N/A	–
Episode 7 (Monday, October 11, 2021)	Kelly	6	Jeremy Rosado	"Hold On"	Jershika Maple	N/A	✔	✔	–
Episode 8 (Tuesday, October 12, 2021)	Blake	1	Hailey Green	"Girl"	Lana Scott	–	Steal used	–	✔
Episode 8 (Tuesday, October 12, 2021)	Blake	2	Libianca	"Save Your Tears"	Tommy Edwards	–	Steal used	–	N/A
Episode 8 (Tuesday, October 12, 2021)	Kelly	3	Xavier Cornell	"telepatía"	Carolina Alonso	N/A	Steal used	–	–
Episode 8 (Tuesday, October 12, 2021)	Ariana	4	Katherine Ann Mohler	"Dilemma"	Vaughn Mugol	–	Steal used	N/A	–
Episode 8 (Tuesday, October 12, 2021)	John	5	BrittanyBree	"Something He Can Feel"	Samara Brown	✔	✔	✔	–
Episode 9 (Monday, October 18, 2021)	John	1	Joshua Vacanti	"Good 4 U"	Keilah Grace	–	Team full	–	–
Episode 9 (Monday, October 18, 2021)	Blake	2	Carson Peters	"Don't Let Our Love Start Slippin' Away"	Clint Sherman	–	Team full	–	N/A
Episode 9 (Monday, October 18, 2021)	Kelly	3	Holly Forbes	"Sunny"	Wyatt Michael	N/A	Team full	–	–
Episode 9 (Monday, October 18, 2021)	Ariana	4	Jim & Sasha Allen	"Signed, Sealed, Delivered, I'm Yours"	Sophia Bromberg	–	Team full	N/A	–
Episode 9 (Monday, October 18, 2021)	Ariana	5	Raquel Trinidad	"Car Wash"	Hailey Mia	✔	Team full	N/A	–
Episode 9 (Monday, October 18, 2021)	Kelly	6	Gymani	"Working"	Aaron Hines	Team full	Team full	–	–
Episode 9 (Monday, October 18, 2021)	John	7	Sabrina Dias	"cardigan"	Jack Rogan	Team full	Team full	–	–
Episode 9 (Monday, October 18, 2021)	John	8	Shadale	"One Last Time"	Janora Brown	Team full	Team full	–	–
Episode 9 (Monday, October 18, 2021)	Blake	9	Wendy Moten	"If I Ever Lose My Faith in You"	Manny Keith	Team full	Team full	✔	N/A
Episode 10 (Tuesday, October 19, 2021)	Ariana	1	Ryleigh Plank	"Come On Over Baby (All I Want Is You)"	KCK3	Team full	Team full	Team full	–
Episode 10 (Tuesday, October 19, 2021)	Kelly	2	The Cunningham Sisters	"It's My Party"	Parker McKay	Team full	Team full	Team full	–
Episode 10 (Tuesday, October 19, 2021)	Blake	3	Berritt Haynes	"Yellow"	Kaitlyn Velez	Team full	Team full	Team full	N/A
Episode 10 (Tuesday, October 19, 2021)	John	4	Paris Winningham	"Here and Now"	Jonathan Mouton	Team full	Team full	Team full	✔

== Knockouts ==
The Knockouts began airing on October 25, 2021. Ed Sheeran served as the mega mentor for this season's knockouts.

In this round, each coach pairs two of their artists in a singing match. The artists themselves will select the song they will sing in the round. The coach will then select one of the artists to advance to the Live Playoffs.

Each coach can steal one losing artist from another team; however, unlike the Battles, the coaches do not have the ability to save their artists during the Knockouts. At the end of this round, four artists will remain on each team whilst four artists will be stolen, creating a total of twenty artists advancing to the Live Playoffs.

Much like the Battles, it was revealed that, for the Live Playoffs Wildcard, one previously eliminated artist from each team had the chance to be voted via Twitter to earn a place in the Top 13 (see Voice Comeback).

Knockouts color key
Artist won the Knockout and advanced to the Live Playoffs
Artist lost the Knockout but, was stolen by another coach, and advanced to the Live Playoffs
Artist lost the Knockout and was eliminated
Artist lost the Knockout and was eliminated, but participated in the Voice Comeback

Knockouts results
Episode	Coach	Order	Winner		Loser		'Steal' result			
Episode	Coach	Order	Song	Artist	Artist	Song	Kelly	John	Ariana	Blake
Episode 11 (Monday, October 25, 2021)	Blake	1	"Ain't No Way"	Wendy Moten	Jonathan Mouton	"I Can See Clearly Now"	–	–	–	N/A
Episode 11 (Monday, October 25, 2021)	Ariana	2	"Valerie"	Raquel Trinidad	Katie Rae	"Hold On To Me"	✔	–	N/A	–
Episode 11 (Monday, October 25, 2021)	Kelly	3	"Pillowtalk"	Gymani	Kinsey Rose	"Strawberry Wine"	Team full	–	–	–
Episode 11 (Monday, October 25, 2021)	John	4	"Falling"	Joshua Vacanti	Sabrina Dias	"Photograph"	Team full	N/A	–	–
Episode 11 (Monday, October 25, 2021)	Blake	5	"Everything I Wanted"	Libianca	Hailey Green	"God's Country"	Team full	–	–	N/A
Episode 11 (Monday, October 25, 2021)	Kelly	6	"Wichita Lineman"	Girl Named Tom	Holly Forbes	"Superstar"	Team full	✔	✔	–
Episode 12 (Tuesday, October 26, 2021)	John	1	"Bruises"	Samuel Harness	BrittanyBree	"Best Part"	Team full	N/A	Team full	–
Episode 12 (Tuesday, October 26, 2021)	Kelly	2	"Arcade"	Hailey Mia	The Cunningham Sisters	"Oceans (Where Feet May Fail)"	Team full	–	Team full	–
Episode 12 (Tuesday, October 26, 2021)	Ariana	3	"Midnight Sky"	Ryleigh Plank	David Vogel	"Lose You to Love Me"	Team full	✔	Team full	–
Episode 13 (Monday, November 1, 2021)	John	1	"Impossible"	Shadale	Samara Brown	"The Best"	Team full	Team full	Team full	–
Episode 13 (Monday, November 1, 2021)	Blake	2	"Wildest Dreams"	Lana Scott	Carson Peters	"Amarillo by Morning"	Team full	Team full	Team full	N/A
Episode 13 (Monday, November 1, 2021)	Ariana	3	"Chandelier"	Bella DeNapoli	Katherine Ann Mohler	"Poison"	Team full	Team full	Team full	–
Episode 13 (Monday, November 1, 2021)	Kelly	4	"Run to You"	Jeremy Rosado	Xavier Cornell	"Falling Slowly"	Team full	Team full	Team full	–
Episode 13 (Monday, November 1, 2021)	Blake	5	"Unchain My Heart"	Peedy Chavis	Berritt Haynes	"I Swear"	Team full	Team full	Team full	N/A
Episode 13 (Monday, November 1, 2021)	Ariana	6	"Home"	Jim & Sasha Allen	Manny Keith	"Golden"	Team full	Team full	Team full	–
Episode 13 (Monday, November 1, 2021)	John	7	"Inseparable"	Jershika Maple	Paris Winningham	"Tennessee Whiskey"	Team full	Team full	Team full	✔
Episode 14 (Tuesday, November 2, 2021)			Special episode, "The Road to Live Shows," reviewing the most notable performances from the contestants who advanced to the Live Playoffs.							

== Voice Comeback ==
Following the conclusion of the Knockouts, it was revealed that one previously eliminated artist from each team had the chance to return to the competition. Each artist was put in a poll via Twitter where viewers voted by tweeting or retweeting. The winner participated in the Live Playoffs Wildcard, having the chance to earn a place in the Top 13.

To participate in the poll, Ariana and Kelly selected Vaughn Mugol and Aaron Hines, respectively, who were eliminated in the Battles. Blake and John selected Hailey Green and Samara Brown, respectively, who were eliminated in the Knockouts.

Voice Comeback color key
Artist won the vote and was selected to compete in the Wild Card instant save
Artist lost the vote and remained eliminated

Voice Comeback results
Coach	Artist	Result
Kelly Clarkson	Aaron Hines	Eliminated
John Legend	Samara Brown	Eliminated
Ariana Grande	Vaughn Mugol	Wild Card
Blake Shelton	Hailey Green	Eliminated

== Live shows ==
Live shows color key
Artist was saved by public's vote
Artist was saved by his/her coach
Artist was selected to compete in the Wild Card instant save
Artist was placed in the bottom group and competed for an Instant Save
Artist was instantly saved
Artist was eliminated

=== Week 1: Top 20 – Playoffs (November 8–9) ===
The Live Playoffs comprised episodes 15 and 16.

On Monday, the Top 20 artists performed live for their chance at a spot in the Top 13. On Tuesday, in the live results show, two artists from each team advanced based on the public's vote, and each coach got to save one of their own artists. The remaining artists from each team with the highest overnight vote then competed for the Wild Card. In addition, Vaughn Mugol, via The Voice Comeback, competed in the Wild Card as well.

Hailey Mia won the Wild Card and advanced to the Top 13. This was the third time, following the fifteenth and seventeenth seasons, that Kelly Clarkson entered the Top 13 with four artists on her team.

Playoffs results
Episode	Coach	Order	Artist	Song	Result
Episode 15 (Monday, November 8, 2021)	Kelly Clarkson	1	Girl Named Tom	"Creep"	Public's vote
Episode 15 (Monday, November 8, 2021)	Kelly Clarkson	2	Katie Rae	"Stormy Weather"	Eliminated
Episode 15 (Monday, November 8, 2021)	Kelly Clarkson	3	Gymani	"Say Something"	Kelly's choice
Episode 15 (Monday, November 8, 2021)	Kelly Clarkson	4	Jeremy Rosado	"When I Was Your Man"	Public's vote
Episode 15 (Monday, November 8, 2021)	Kelly Clarkson	5	Hailey Mia	"Traitor"	Wild Card
Episode 15 (Monday, November 8, 2021)	John Legend	6	Shadale	"Love on the Brain"	John's choice
Episode 15 (Monday, November 8, 2021)	John Legend	7	Joshua Vacanti	"You and I"	Public's vote
Episode 15 (Monday, November 8, 2021)	John Legend	8	Jershika Maple	"Beggin'"	Public's vote
Episode 15 (Monday, November 8, 2021)	John Legend	9	Samuel Harness	"So Sick"	Wild Card
Episode 15 (Monday, November 8, 2021)	John Legend	10	David Vogel	"Slow Burn"	Eliminated
Episode 15 (Monday, November 8, 2021)	Ariana Grande	11	Raquel Trinidad	"Don't Know Why"	Eliminated
Episode 15 (Monday, November 8, 2021)	Ariana Grande	12	Jim & Sasha Allen	"Hey Jude"	Public's vote
Episode 15 (Monday, November 8, 2021)	Ariana Grande	13	Bella DeNapoli	"The Sweet Escape"	Wild Card
Episode 15 (Monday, November 8, 2021)	Ariana Grande	14	Ryleigh Plank	"I'm Your Baby Tonight"	Ariana's choice
Episode 15 (Monday, November 8, 2021)	Ariana Grande	15	Holly Forbes	"Torn"	Public's vote
Episode 15 (Monday, November 8, 2021)	Blake Shelton	16	Peedy Chavis	"Proud Mary"	Wild Card
Episode 15 (Monday, November 8, 2021)	Blake Shelton	17	Libianca	"Woman"	Eliminated
Episode 15 (Monday, November 8, 2021)	Blake Shelton	18	Paris Winningham	"I Wish It Would Rain"	Public's vote
Episode 15 (Monday, November 8, 2021)	Blake Shelton	19	Lana Scott	"Next Girl"	Blake's choice
Episode 15 (Monday, November 8, 2021)	Blake Shelton	20	Wendy Moten	"I Will Always Love You"	Public's vote
Episode 16 (Tuesday, November 9, 2021)	John Legend	1	Samuel Harness	"Before You Go"	Eliminated
Episode 16 (Tuesday, November 9, 2021)	Ariana Grande	2	Bella DeNapoli	"Ain't No Other Man"	Eliminated
Episode 16 (Tuesday, November 9, 2021)	Blake Shelton	3	Peedy Chavis	"Stranger in My House"	Eliminated
Episode 16 (Tuesday, November 9, 2021)	Kelly Clarkson	4	Hailey Mia	"Jar of Hearts"	Wild Card Winner
Episode 16 (Tuesday, November 9, 2021)	Ariana Grande	5	Vaughn Mugol	"Lay Me Down"	Eliminated

=== Week 2: Top 13 (November 15–16) ===
This week's theme was “Dedications." The three artists who received the fewest votes competed for the Instant Save on the results show. There was only one artist in the bottom three receiving the instant save, eliminating the other two artists from the competition. Also, this season restored the previous elimination format last used in season 17, which does not guarantee a coach will have an artist in the finale.

As studio performances began being released, trio Girl Named Tom became the first contestant this season to crack the Top 10 on iTunes Songs Chart. Their cover of "Dust in the Wind" hit #10 at the close of the voting window.

Top 13 results
Episode	Coach	Order	Artist	Song	Result
Episode 17 (Monday, November 15, 2021)	Blake Shelton	1	Paris Winningham	"What's Going On"	Public's vote
Episode 17 (Monday, November 15, 2021)	Kelly Clarkson	2	Jeremy Rosado	"Because You Loved Me"	Public's vote
Episode 17 (Monday, November 15, 2021)	Ariana Grande	3	Ryleigh Plank	"Rhiannon"	Bottom three
Episode 17 (Monday, November 15, 2021)	Kelly Clarkson	4	Girl Named Tom	"Dust in the Wind"	Public's vote
Episode 17 (Monday, November 15, 2021)	John Legend	5	Shadale	"Life Is a Highway"	Bottom three
Episode 17 (Monday, November 15, 2021)	Kelly Clarkson	6	Hailey Mia	"I'll Stand by You"	Public's vote
Episode 17 (Monday, November 15, 2021)	Blake Shelton	7	Wendy Moten	"Blue Bayou"	Public's vote
Episode 17 (Monday, November 15, 2021)	John Legend	8	Jershika Maple	"God Only Knows"	Public's vote
Episode 17 (Monday, November 15, 2021)	Ariana Grande	9	Jim & Sasha Allen	"Your Song"	Public's vote
Episode 17 (Monday, November 15, 2021)	Blake Shelton	10	Lana Scott	"Humble and Kind"	Public's vote
Episode 17 (Monday, November 15, 2021)	Kelly Clarkson	11	Gymani	"Made a Way"	Bottom three
Episode 17 (Monday, November 15, 2021)	John Legend	12	Joshua Vacanti	"You Will Be Found"	Public's vote
Episode 17 (Monday, November 15, 2021)	Ariana Grande	13	Holly Forbes	"The Dance"	Public's vote
Episode 18 (Tuesday, November 16, 2021)	John Legend	1	Shadale	"Breathe"	Eliminated
Episode 18 (Tuesday, November 16, 2021)	Kelly Clarkson	2	Gymani	"Sweet Love"	Instantly Saved
Episode 18 (Tuesday, November 16, 2021)	Ariana Grande	3	Ryleigh Plank	"Dangerous Woman"	Eliminated

Non-competition performances
Order	Performers	Song
18.1	John Legend and his team (Jershika Maple, Shadale, and Joshua Vacanti)	"Don't You Worry 'bout a Thing"
18.2	Kelly Clarkson and her team (Girl Named Tom, Gymani, Hailey Mia, and Jeremy Rosado)	"U Move, I Move"

=== Week 3: Top 11 (November 22–23) ===
This week was "Fan Week"; the viewers selected the songs the remaining artists would perform. At the results show, the two artists with the fewest public votes competed for the sole instant save for that week, resulting in the elimination one artist.

Once again, Girl Named Tom reached Top 10 on iTunes Songs Chart at #9. They were also the only contestant placing in the top 100 (for the second consecutive week).

Top 11 results
Episode	Coach	Order	Artist	Song	Result
Episode 19 (Monday, November 22, 2021)	Blake Shelton	1	Wendy Moten	"Freeway of Love"	Public's vote
Episode 19 (Monday, November 22, 2021)	Kelly Clarkson	2	Girl Named Tom	"More Hearts Than Mine"	Public's vote
Episode 19 (Monday, November 22, 2021)	Ariana Grande	3	Holly Forbes	"Alone"	Public's vote
Episode 19 (Monday, November 22, 2021)	John Legend	4	Jershika Maple	"How Can I Ease the Pain"	Public's vote
Episode 19 (Monday, November 22, 2021)	Blake Shelton	5	Lana Scott	"I Hope"	Public's vote
Episode 19 (Monday, November 22, 2021)	John Legend	6	Joshua Vacanti	"The Show Must Go On"	Public's vote
Episode 19 (Monday, November 22, 2021)	Kelly Clarkson	7	Jeremy Rosado	"Reckless Love"	Public's vote
Episode 19 (Monday, November 22, 2021)	Kelly Clarkson	8	Gymani	"Diamonds"	Bottom two
Episode 19 (Monday, November 22, 2021)	Ariana Grande	9	Jim & Sasha Allen	"Have You Ever Seen The Rain"	Bottom two
Episode 19 (Monday, November 22, 2021)	Blake Shelton	10	Paris Winningham	"Use Me"	Public's vote
Episode 19 (Monday, November 22, 2021)	Kelly Clarkson	11	Hailey Mia	"Elastic Heart"	Public's vote
Episode 20 (Tuesday, November 23, 2021)	Kelly Clarkson	1	Gymani	"Tell Me Something Good"	Eliminated
Episode 20 (Tuesday, November 23, 2021)	Ariana Grande	2	Jim & Sasha Allen	"I Won't Give Up"	Instantly Saved

Non-competition performances
Order	Performers	Song
20.1	Ariana Grande and her team (Jim and Sasha Allen, Holly Forbes)	"FourFiveSeconds"
20.2	Blake Shelton and his team (Wendy Moten, Lana Scott, and Paris Winningham)	"I Can't Help Myself (Sugar Pie Honey Bunch)"

=== Week 4: Top 10 (November 29–30) ===
Week four was "Challenge Week," wherein the remaining artists sang songs "outside of their genre." The three artists who received the fewest votes competed for the Instant Save on the results show. One was instantly saved, eliminating the other two artists from the competition.

No performance reached the top 10 on iTunes this week. However, for the first time this season, four contestants reached the top 100, with their highest charting being Girl Named Tom at #12, Jim & Sasha Allen at #33, Wendy Moten at #45, and Paris Winningham at #53.

The three artists in the bottom three – Holly Forbes, Jeremy Rosado, and Jershika Maple – were all originally from Team Kelly.

Top 10 results
Episode	Coach	Order	Artist	Song	Result
Episode 21 (Monday, November 29, 2021)	Ariana Grande	1	Holly Forbes	"Last Dance"	Bottom three
Episode 21 (Monday, November 29, 2021)	Blake Shelton	2	Wendy Moten	"Jolene"	Public's vote
Episode 21 (Monday, November 29, 2021)	Kelly Clarkson	3	Jeremy Rosado	"Freedom Was a Highway"	Bottom three
Episode 21 (Monday, November 29, 2021)	John Legend	4	Jershika Maple	"Ain't It Fun"	Bottom three
Episode 21 (Monday, November 29, 2021)	Blake Shelton	5	Lana Scott	"The One That Got Away"	Public's vote
Episode 21 (Monday, November 29, 2021)	John Legend	6	Joshua Vacanti	"If I Ain't Got You"	Public's vote
Episode 21 (Monday, November 29, 2021)	Ariana Grande	7	Jim & Sasha Allen	"Stay"	Public's vote
Episode 21 (Monday, November 29, 2021)	Blake Shelton	8	Paris Winningham	"Amazed"	Public's vote
Episode 21 (Monday, November 29, 2021)	Kelly Clarkson	9	Hailey Mia	"Peter Pan"	Public's vote
Episode 21 (Monday, November 29, 2021)	Kelly Clarkson	10	Girl Named Tom	"Viva la Vida"	Public's vote
Episode 22 (Tuesday, November 30, 2021)	Kelly Clarkson	1	Jeremy Rosado	"What Hurts the Most"	Eliminated
Episode 22 (Tuesday, November 30, 2021)	Ariana Grande	2	Holly Forbes	"Because of You"	Eliminated
Episode 22 (Tuesday, November 30, 2021)	John Legend	3	Jershika Maple	"What Is Love"	Instantly Saved

Non-competition performances
Order	Performers	Song
21.1	Måneskin	"Beggin'"/"Mammamia"
22.1	Carter Rubin	"Horoscope"
22.2	Mae Muller	"Better Days"

=== Week 5: Top 8 – Semifinals (December 6–7) ===
The Top 8 performed on Monday, with the results following on Tuesday. The four artists with the most votes automatically moved on to the finale; the remaining four artists competed in the Instant Save for the fifth and final spot in the finale.

In addition to their solo song, each artist performed a 90s duet with another act. The duets were not available to purchase on iTunes.

This week, Girl Named Tom's cover of "River" marked the first The Voice studio performance to hit #1 on iTunes Overall Chart since the eighteenth season. Additionally, four other contestants reached the top 100: Wendy Moten at #17, Hailey Mia at #56, Joshua Vacanti at #90, and Paris Winningham at #96. Jim & Sasha Allen and Jershika Maple just missed out on the top 100 at #104 and #106, respectively.

With the elimination of Jim & Sasha Allen, Ariana Grande had no artists left on her team, marking the first instance of a coach not being represented in the finale since the sixteenth season, as well as the first time since the thirteenth season that a first attempting coach was not represented in the finale.

In contrast, the advancements of Girl Named Tom and Hailey Mia marked the first time that a female coach (Kelly Clarkson) had two artists on her team advance to the finale, with Girl Named Tom's advancement marking the first time that a trio has advanced to the finale. This was the first season that two coaches had multiple artists represented in the finale (Kelly and Blake with 2 each); Hailey Mia also became the first Wild card Instant Save winner to make it to the finale.

Semifinals results
Episode	Coach	Order	Artist	Solo Song	Order	'90s Duet Song	Results
Episode 23 (Monday, December 6, 2021)	Ariana Grande	1	Jim & Sasha Allen	"Mrs. Robinson"	6	"Hold My Hand"	Bottom four
Episode 23 (Monday, December 6, 2021)	John Legend	2	Jershika Maple	"Don't Let the Sun Go Down on Me"	8	"Hand in My Pocket"	Bottom four
Episode 23 (Monday, December 6, 2021)	Blake Shelton	9	Wendy Moten	"You're All I Need to Get By"	3	"Change the World"	Public's vote
Episode 23 (Monday, December 6, 2021)	Blake Shelton	11	Paris Winningham	"Close the Door"	3	"Change the World"	Public's vote
Episode 23 (Monday, December 6, 2021)	Blake Shelton	4	Lana Scott	"Something in the Water"	6	"Hold My Hand"	Bottom four
Episode 23 (Monday, December 6, 2021)	Kelly Clarkson	5	Hailey Mia	"Someone You Loved"	10	"Hold On"	Public's vote
Episode 23 (Monday, December 6, 2021)	Kelly Clarkson	7	Girl Named Tom	"River"	10	"Hold On"	Public's vote
Episode 23 (Monday, December 6, 2021)	John Legend	12	Joshua Vacanti	"Ashes"	8	"Hand in My Pocket"	Bottom four
Episode 24 (Tuesday, December 7, 2021)	Blake Shelton	1	Lana Scott	"Things a Man Oughta Know"			Eliminated
Episode 24 (Tuesday, December 7, 2021)	John Legend	2	Joshua Vacanti	"My Heart Will Go On"			Eliminated
Episode 24 (Tuesday, December 7, 2021)	Ariana Grande	3	Jim & Sasha Allen	"Rich Girl"			Eliminated
Episode 24 (Tuesday, December 7, 2021)	John Legend	4	Jershika Maple	"Break Every Chain"			Instantly Saved

Non-competition performances
Order	Performers	Song
24.1	Carly Pearce	"29"
24.2	John Legend	"You Deserve It All"
24.3	Blake Shelton	"Come Back as a Country Boy"

=== Week 6: Finale (December 13–14) ===
The Top 5 finalists performed two songs on Monday, as well as a duet with their coach on Tuesday. This was the second consecutive season in which contestants did not to perform original songs in the finale.

Girl Named Tom was the only contestant that managed to get both finale songs reach Top 10 on iTunes at #1 and #7 (along with their Top 8 and Top 13 songs at #3 and #8). This was the third time a contestant had 4 songs in the top subsequently. (after Jordan Smith in season 9 and Jake Hoot in season 17). All their other songs also got back on the Top 100 overall. In addition, Wendy Moten charted within the Top 10 on iTunes at #10 and #70 (with her Top 8 song at #85), Paris Winningham hit #25, and Hailey Mia reached #33. Coach duets were not released to purchase this season.

Girl Named Tom was announced as the winner, making them the first-ever trio to win The Voice. Kelly Clarkson received her fourth win, surpassing Adam Levine's three wins and becoming the coach with the largest amount of wins as a coach. She also had a winning percentage of 50% by winning 4 of her 8 seasons; this was tied with Usher for the best winning percentage of any coach.

This season was the second instances that three stolen artists advanced to the finale, with the eighth season being the first time; Jershika Maple was originally from Team Kelly, Hailey Mia was originally from Ariana's team, and Paris Winningham was originally from John's team.

Finale results
Coach	Artist	Episode 25 (Monday, December 13, 2021)				Episode 26 (Tuesday, December 14, 2021)		Result
Coach	Artist	Order	Uptempo song	Order	Ballad	Order	Duet (with Coach)	Result
Kelly Clarkson	Hailey Mia	1	"Deja Vu"	6	"Idontwannabeyouanymore"	11	"Funny"	Fourth place
Blake Shelton	Paris Winningham	7	"Ain't Nobody"	2	"Me and Mrs. Jones"	12	"Love Train"	Third place
Kelly Clarkson	Girl Named Tom	3	"The Chain"	8	"Baby Now That I've Found You"	14	"Leave Before You Love Me"	Winner
John Legend	Jershika Maple	9	"Rolling In the Deep"	4	"I'm Goin' Down"	13	"O Holy Night"	Fifth place
Blake Shelton	Wendy Moten	5	"How Will I Know"	10	"Over the Rainbow"	15	"Just a Fool"	Runner-up

Non-competition performances
Order	Performers	Song
25.1	Kelly Clarkson	"Christmas Isn't Canceled (Just You)"
26.1	Coldplay and BTS (Note: BTS performed in hollographics projected onto the stage via technology.)	"My Universe"
26.2	Walker Hayes	"Fancy Like"
26.3	Tori Kelly, Keke Palmer, and the Top 13	"Christmas (Baby Please Come Home)"
26.4	Ed Sheeran	"Shivers"
26.5	Jennifer Lopez (with Lukas Nelson)	"On My Way"
26.6	Carrie Underwood and John Legend	"Hallelujah"
26.7	Alicia Keys	"Old Memories"
26.8	Ariana Grande and Kid Cudi	"Just Look Up"

== Elimination chart ==
Results color key
Winner	Saved by instant save (via Voice App)
Runner-up	Saved by the public
Third place	Saved by their coach
Fourth place	Saved by Wildcard (via Voice App)
Fifth place	Eliminated

Coaches color key
Team Kelly
Team Legend
Team Ariana
Team Blake

=== Overall ===
Live shows results per week
Artists	Week 1 Playoffs	Week 2	Week 3	Week 4	Week 5	Week 6 Finale
Girl Named Tom	Safe	Safe	Safe	Safe	Safe	Winner
Wendy Moten	Safe	Safe	Safe	Safe	Safe	Runner-up
Paris Winningham	Safe	Safe	Safe	Safe	Safe	3rd place
Hailey Mia	Safe	Safe	Safe	Safe	Safe	4th place
Jershika Maple	Safe	Safe	Safe	Safe	Safe	5th place
Joshua Vacanti	Safe	Safe	Safe	Safe	Eliminated	Eliminated (Week 5)
Jim & Sasha Allen	Safe	Safe	Safe	Safe	Eliminated	Eliminated (Week 5)
Lana Scott	Safe	Safe	Safe	Safe	Eliminated	Eliminated (Week 5)
Holly Forbes	Safe	Safe	Safe	Eliminated	Eliminated (Week 4)	
Jeremy Rosado	Safe	Safe	Safe	Eliminated	Eliminated (Week 4)	
Gymani	Safe	Safe	Eliminated	Eliminated (Week 3)		
Ryleigh Plank	Safe	Eliminated	Eliminated (Week 2)			
Shadale	Safe	Eliminated	Eliminated (Week 2)			
Bella DeNapoli	Eliminated	Eliminated (Week 1)				
David Vogel	Eliminated	Eliminated (Week 1)				
Katie Rae	Eliminated	Eliminated (Week 1)				
Libianca	Eliminated	Eliminated (Week 1)				
Peedy Chavis	Eliminated	Eliminated (Week 1)				
Raquel Trinidad	Eliminated	Eliminated (Week 1)				
Samuel Harness	Eliminated	Eliminated (Week 1)				
Vaughn Mugol	Eliminated	Eliminated (Week 1)				

=== Per team ===
Live shows results per team ( indicates the performance reached Top 10 on iTunes)
Artists	Week 1 Playoffs	Week 2	Week 3	Week 4	Week 5	Week 6 Finale
Girl Named Tom	Advanced	Advanced	Advanced	Advanced	Advanced	Winner
Hailey Mia	Advanced	Advanced	Advanced	Advanced	Advanced	Fourth place
Jeremy Rosado	Advanced	Advanced	Advanced	Eliminated		
Gymani	Advanced	Advanced	Eliminated			
Katie Rae	Eliminated					
Jershika Maple	Advanced	Advanced	Advanced	Advanced	Advanced	Fifth place
Joshua Vacanti	Advanced	Advanced	Advanced	Advanced	Eliminated	
Shadale	Advanced	Eliminated				
Samuel Harness	Eliminated					
David Vogel	Eliminated					
Jim & Sasha Allen	Advanced	Advanced	Advanced	Advanced	Eliminated	
Holly Forbes	Advanced	Advanced	Advanced	Eliminated		
Ryleigh Plank	Advanced	Eliminated				
Bella DeNapoli	Eliminated					
Vaughn Mugol	Eliminated					
Raquel Trinidad	Eliminated					
Wendy Moten	Advanced	Advanced	Advanced	Advanced	Advanced	Runner-up
Paris Winningham	Advanced	Advanced	Advanced	Advanced	Advanced	Third place
Lana Scott	Advanced	Advanced	Advanced	Advanced	Eliminated	
Peedy Chavis	Eliminated					
Libianca	Eliminated					

== Ratings ==
Viewership and ratings per episode of The Voice season 21
No.	Title	Air date	Timeslot (ET)	Rating (18–49)	Viewers (millions)
1	"The Blind Auditions, Season Premiere"	September 20, 2021	Monday 8:00 p.m.	1.1	7.22
2	"The Blind Auditions, Part 2"	September 21, 2021	Tuesday 8:00 p.m.	1.1	7.35
3	"The Blind Auditions, Part 3"	September 27, 2021	Monday 8:00 p.m.	1.0	6.86
4	"The Blind Auditions, Part 4"	September 28, 2021	Tuesday 8:00 p.m.	1.0	7.43
5	"The Blind Auditions, Part 5"	October 4, 2021	Monday 8:00 p.m.	1.0	7.48
6	"The Blind Auditions, Part 6"	October 5, 2021	Tuesday 8:00 p.m.	0.9	7.21
7	"The Battles Premiere"	October 11, 2021	Monday 8:00 p.m.	0.9	7.01
8	"The Battles, Part 2"	October 12, 2021	Tuesday 8:00 p.m.	0.9	6.56
9	"The Battles, Part 3"	October 18, 2021	Monday 8:00 p.m.	0.8	6.36
10	"The Battles, Part 4"	October 19, 2021	Tuesday 8:00 p.m.	0.7	6.73
11	"The Knockouts Premiere"	October 25, 2021	Monday 8:00 p.m.	0.9	6.90
12	"The Knockouts Part 2"	October 26, 2021	Tuesday 8:00 p.m.	0.8	6.71
13	"The Knockouts Part 3"	November 1, 2021	Monday 8:00 p.m.	0.8	6.55
14	"The Road to Live Shows"	November 2, 2021	Tuesday 8:00 p.m.	0.5	4.99
15	"Live Playoffs Performances"	November 8, 2021	Monday 8:00 p.m.	0.8	6.18
16	"Live Playoffs Results"	November 9, 2021	Tuesday 8:00 p.m.	0.8	6.85
17	"Live Top 13 Performances"	November 15, 2021	Monday 8:00 p.m.	0.8	6.56
18	"Live Top 13 Results"	November 16, 2021	Tuesday 8:00 p.m.	0.8	6.78
19	"Live Top 11 Performances"	November 22, 2021	Monday 8:00 p.m.	0.7	6.33
20	"Live Top 11 Results"	November 23, 2021	Tuesday 8:00 p.m.	0.8	6.34
21	"Live Top 10 Performances"	November 29, 2021	Monday 8:00 p.m.	0.8	6.48
22	"Live Top 10 Results"	November 30, 2021	Tuesday 8:00 p.m.	0.7	6.76
23	"Live Semi-Final Top 8 Performances"	December 6, 2021	Monday 8:00 p.m.	0.7	6.79
24	"Live Semi-Final Top 8 Results"	December 7, 2021	Tuesday 8:00 p.m.	0.7	6.89
25	"Live Finale, Part 1"	December 13, 2021	Monday 8:00 p.m.	0.7	7.28
26	"Live Finale, Part 2"	December 14, 2021	Tuesday 9:00 p.m.	0.7	6.98
