= Jeremy Rosado =

American singer

- Born: Jeremy German Rosado; March 24, 1992 (age 34); Valrico, Florida, United States
- Genres: Pop, Christian pop
- Occupation: Singer
- Instrument: Vocals
- Years active: 2012–present
- Labels: Save the City, Capitol Christian Music Group
- Website: www.iamjeremyrosado.com/

Jeremy German Rosado (born March 24, 1992) is an American singer from Valrico, Florida. He placed thirteenth on the eleventh season of American Idol.

== Early life ==
Rosado graduated from Durant High School in Plant City, Florida in 2010. He attended Hillsborough Community College; he worked as a front desk clerk for an infectious diseases doctor. Among his musical influences are Francesca Battistelli, Kirk Franklin and Israel Houghton.

== American Idol ==
Rosado auditioned for American Idol four times in a row prior to the eleventh season. Jennifer Lopez has dubbed him as "Jer-Bear."

In the semi-finals, Rosado performed "Gravity" by Sara Bareilles. He was not one of the top five vote getters but was one of the six contestants selected to perform in the wild card round. In the wild card round, he performed "I Know You Won't" by Carrie Underwood, was one of the three contestants selected to be a wild card, and advanced to the top 13. In the top 13, he performed Stevie Wonder's "Ribbon in the Sky". He was the lowest male vote getter and went against Elise Testone as the lowest female vote getter. The judges chose to save Testone and Rosado was eliminated from the competition. He is the first male and fourth wild card finalist to be eliminated first in the finals.

=== Performances/results ===
Episode	Theme	Song choice	Original artist	Order #	Result
Audition	Auditioner's Choice	Not aired		N/A	Advanced
Hollywood Round, Part 1	First Solo	"Superstar"	Delaney & Bonnie	N/A	Advanced
Hollywood Round, Part 2	Group Performance	"Mercy"	Duffy	N/A	Advanced
Hollywood Round, Part 3	Second Solo	Not aired		N/A	Advanced
Las Vegas Round	Songs from the 1950s Group Performance	"Rockin' Robin"	Bobby Day	N/A	Advanced
Final Judgement	Final Solo	"I Know You Won't"	Carrie Underwood	N/A	Advanced
Top 25 (13 Men)	Personal Choice	"Gravity"	Sara Bareilles	5	Wild Card
Wild Card	Personal Choice	"I Know You Won't"	Carrie Underwood	2	Advanced
Top 13	Stevie Wonder	"Ribbon in the Sky"	Stevie Wonder	11	Eliminated

== Post-Idol ==
After the show, Rosado appeared on Live! with Kelly on March 12, 2012, the Today show the next day, and Good Morning America. His first single, "Don't Be Afraid", was released on April 2, 2013. His first studio album, Heartbeat, was released on August 28, 2015, by Save the City Records.

In August 2016, Rosado was the worship leader for Free Life Chapel in Lakeland, Florida. In 2021, Rosado competed on the twenty-first season of The Voice, as part of Kelly Clarkson's team. He was eliminated in the fourth week of the Live Shows.

Rosado signed a recording contract with Capitol Christian Music in 2022.

== Discography ==
=== Singles ===
Title	Year	Peak chart positions		Album
Title	Year	US Christ Air	US Christ AC	Album
"Feliz Navidad"	2025	10	13	Non-album single
