= The Voice (American TV series) season 20 =

The Voice
- Season 20
- Promotional poster featuring coaches Jonas, Clarkson, Shelton, and Legend
- Hosted by: Carson Daly
- Coaches: Kelly Clarkson; John Legend; Nick Jonas; Blake Shelton; Kelsea Ballerini (guest)
- No. of contestants: 40 artists
- Winner: Cam Anthony
- Winning coach: Blake Shelton
- Runner-up: Kenzie Wheeler
- No. of episodes: 18

Release
- Original network: NBC
- Original release: March 1 – May 25, 2021

Season chronology
- ← Previous; Season 19 Next → Season 21

The twentieth season of the American reality television series The Voice premiered on March 1, 2021, on NBC. Blake Shelton, Kelly Clarkson and John Legend returned as coaches for their twentieth, seventh, and fifth seasons, respectively. Nick Jonas rejoined the panel for his second season, after being replaced by Gwen Stefani the previous season. Meanwhile, Carson Daly returned for his twentieth season as host. Kelsea Ballerini returned for her second season as a guest coach, filling in for Clarkson during the battles round.

Cam Anthony was named the winner of the season, marking Blake Shelton's record-extending eighth win as a coach, with Anthony's win being the fourth African-American male winner and the first winning artist that saw a coach blocked in their blind audition (Nick Jonas blocking John Legend).

== Coaches and hosts ==
Coaches and Host of The Voice Season 20

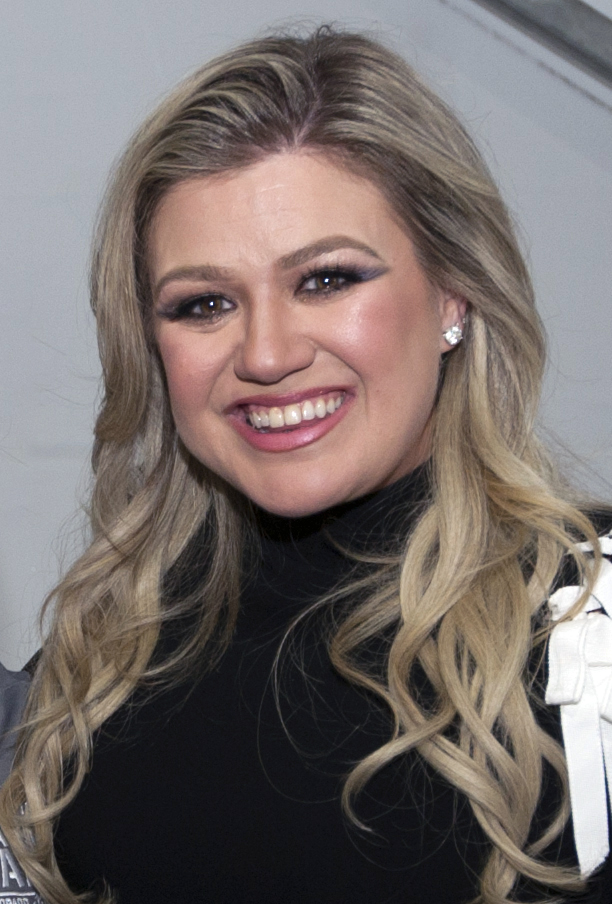
Kelly Clarkson

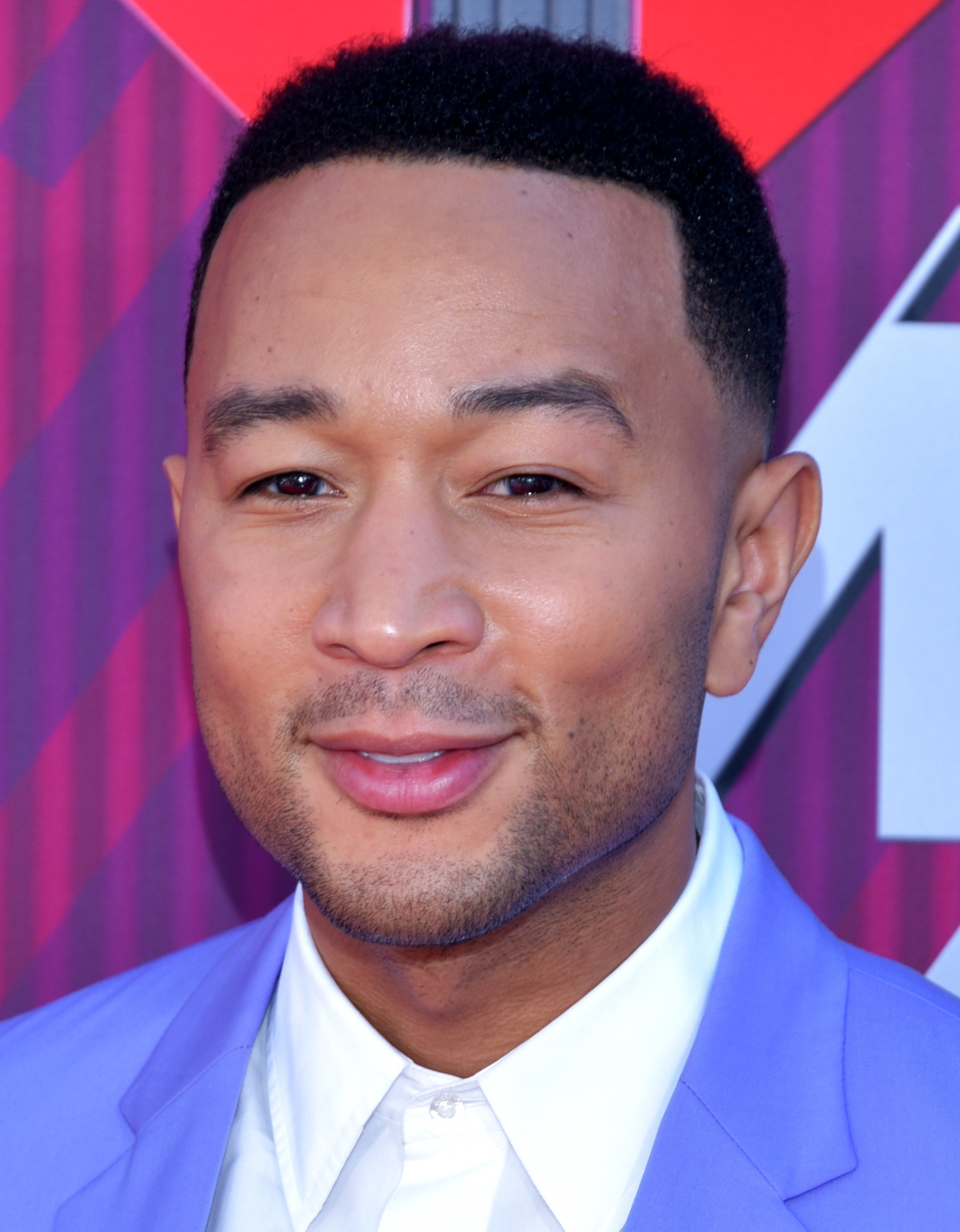
John Legend

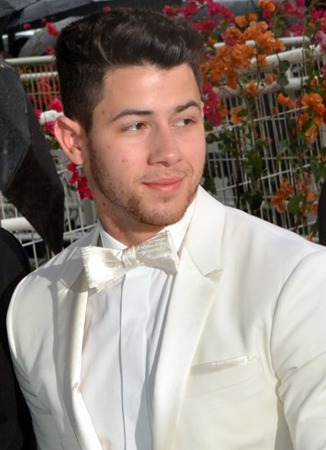
Nick Jonas

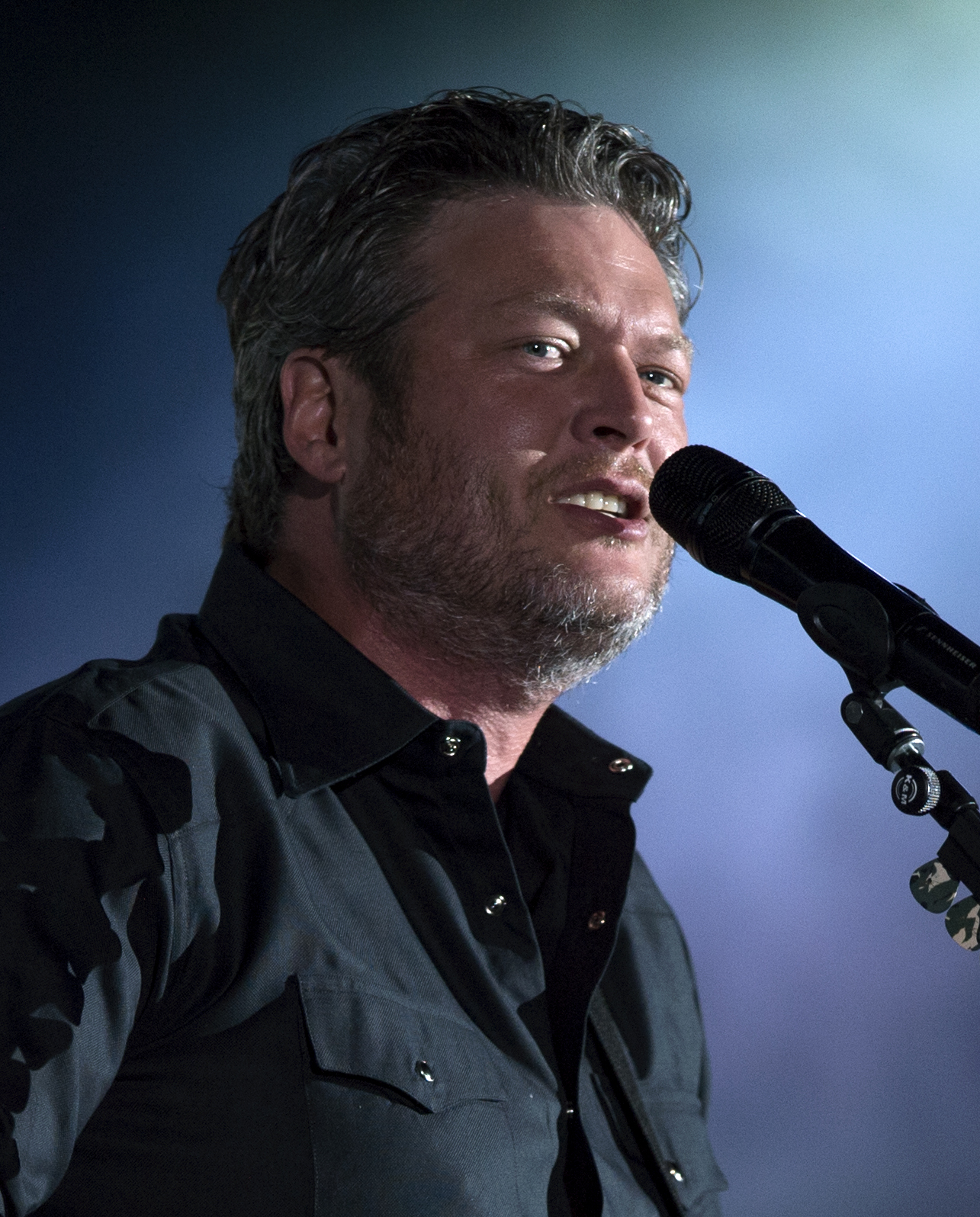
Blake Shelton

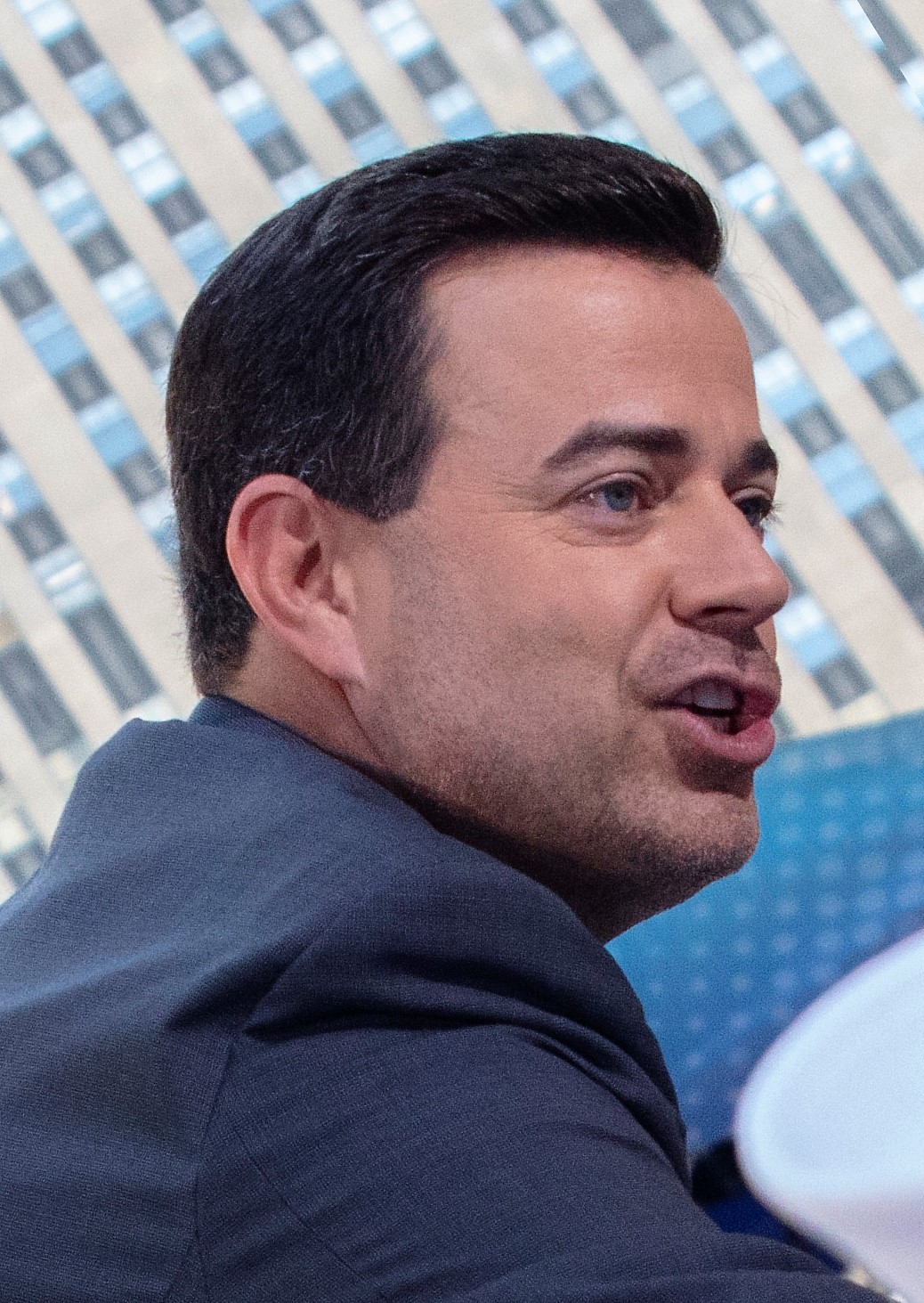
Carson Daly

On November 17, 2020, NBC announced there would be a change in the coaches for this season. Blake Shelton returning for his twentieth season, Kelly Clarkson for her seventh, and John Legend for his fifth. However, Gwen Stefani did not return, allowing the return of Nick Jonas after a one-season hiatus, marking his second season as a coach on the show.

This season's advisors for the Battles are Dan + Shay for Team Blake, Luis Fonsi for Team Kelly, Brandy for Team Legend, and Darren Criss for Team Nick. However, Clarkson was not present for the battles round; filling in for her during that round was season 15 "Comeback Stage" coach, Kelsea Ballerini.

The Knockouts Mega Mentor for all coaches is Snoop Dogg.

== Teams ==
Teams color key
Winner	Eliminated in the Live Playoffs
Runner-up	Stolen in the Knockout rounds
Third place	Eliminated in the Knockout rounds
Fourth place	Stolen in the Battle rounds
Fifth place	Eliminated in the Battle rounds
Eliminated in Live Semi-final

Coaches' Teams
Coaches	Top 40 artists					
Kelly Clarkson						
Kelly Clarkson	Kenzie Wheeler	Gihanna Zoë	Corey Ward	Zae Romeo	~~Anna Grace~~	~~Ryleigh Modig~~
Kelly Clarkson	Savanna Woods	Avery Roberson	~~Gean Garcia~~	Ainae	JD Casper	Halley Greg
John Legend						
John Legend	Victor Solomon	Pia Renee	Ryleigh Modig	Zania Alaké	Carolina Rial	Rio Doyle
John Legend	Gean Garcia	Ciana Pelekai	Durell Anthony	Christine Cain	Denisha Dalton	Deion Warren
Nick Jonas						
Nick Jonas	Rachel Mac	Dana Monique	Jose Figueroa Jr.	Devan Blake Jones	Andrew Marshall	~~Zae Romeo~~
Nick Jonas	Keegan Ferrell	Raine Stern	~~Andrew Marshall~~	Awari	Lindsay Joan	Bradley Sinclair
Blake Shelton						
Blake Shelton	Cam Anthony	Jordan Matthew Young	Pete Mroz	Anna Grace	~~Andrew Marshall~~	Emma Caroline
Blake Shelton	Connor Christian	Ethan Lively	~~Keegan Ferrell~~	~~Avery Roberson~~	Savanna Chestnut	Aaron Konzelman
Note: Italicized names are stolen artists (names struck through within former teams). Underlined names are artists saved by his/her coach and advanced to four-way Knockout.

== Blind auditions ==
The blind auditions began on March 1, 2021, and concluded on March 22, 2021. Each coach has one block to stop another coach from getting an artist. Each coach ends up with 10 artists by the end of the blind auditions. This creates for a total of 40 artists advancing to the battles. In this round, 51 artists auditioned.

Blind auditions color key
✔	Coach hit his/her "I WANT YOU" button
	Artist defaulted to a coach's team
	Artist selected to join this coach's team
	Artist was eliminated with no coach pressing their button
✘	Coach pressed "I WANT YOU" button, but was blocked by another coach from getting the artist
	Blocked by Kelly; Blocked by John; Blocked by Nick; Blocked by Blake

=== Episode 1 (March 1) ===
Among this episode's auditionees was Cam Anthony, who won the 2018 season of Showtime at the Apollo; Devan Blake Jones, who previously competed on the eleventh and twelfth season of American Idol; and Corey Ward, who previously auditioned unsuccessfully in season 19.

Order	Artist	Age	Hometown	Song	Coach's and artist's choices			
Order	Artist	Age	Hometown	Song	Kelly	John	Nick	Blake
1	Kenzie Wheeler	22	Dover, Florida	"Don't Close Your Eyes"	✔	✔	✔	✘^{1}
2	Dana Monique	41	Houston, Texas	"Freeway of Love"	–	✔	✔	–
3	Cam Anthony	19	North Philly, Pennsylvania	"Lay Me Down"	–	✘	✔	✔
4	Christine Cain	27	Pasadena, California	"Watermelon Sugar"	✔	✔	–	–
5	Madison Curbelo	18	Westfield, Massachusetts	"Don't Worry, Be Happy"	–	–	–	–
6	Pete Mroz	45	Nashville, Tennessee	"Can’t Find My Way Home"	–	✔	–	✔
7	Devan Blake Jones	35	Denver, Colorado	"Hard Place"	–	–	✔	–
8	Raine Stern	22	Madison, Wisconsin	"Electric Feel"	–	✔	✔	✔
9	Madison Marigold	21	Santa Clarita, California	"If the World Was Ending"	–	–	–	–
10	Corey Ward	34	Hartsville, South Carolina	"Dancing on My Own"	✔	✔	–	–
11	Victor Solomon	22	Peoria, Illinois	"Glory" (Note: V. Solomon and J. Legend later performed a snippet of the song "Ordinary People" after Solomon's audition.)	–	✔	✔	✔

- ^1 Nick tried to block Blake, but was not possible, since Kelly already blocked him.

=== Episode 2 (March 2) ===
Order	Artist	Age	Hometown	Song	Coach's and artist's choices			
Order	Artist	Age	Hometown	Song	Kelly	John	Nick	Blake
1	Gean Garcia	19	McAllen, Texas	"All I Want"	✔	–	✘	✔
2	Aaron Konzelman	39	Waco, Texas	"Ordinary World"	–	✔	–	✔
3	Carolina Rial	17	Ridgefield, New Jersey	"Stay With Me"	–	✔	✔	–
4	Ethan Lively	17	Coalfield, Tennessee	"You Look So Good in Love"	–	–	–	✔
5	Yellsmiles (Danielle Escobar)	30	Sussex County, New Jersey	"Midnight Sky"	–	–	–	–
6	Zae Romeo	21	McKinney, Texas	"Falling"	✔	✔	✔	✔

=== Episode 3 (March 8) ===
Among the episode's auditionees was Pia Renee, who previously competed on the seventh season of American Idol under her real name, Pia Easley; and Ciana Pelekai, who previously competed on the eighth season of America's Got Talent.

Order	Artist	Age	Hometown	Song	Coach's and artist's choices			
Order	Artist	Age	Hometown	Song	Kelly	John	Nick	Blake
1	Ryleigh Modig	18	Spencer, Massachusetts	"When the Party's Over"	✔	–	✔	–
2	Pia Renee	37	Chicago, Illinois	"Master Blaster (Jammin')"	–	✔	–	✔
3	Andrew Marshall	21	Boxford, Massachusetts	"Gravity"	–	–	✔	–
4	Emma Caroline	25	Tuscaloosa, Alabama	"Slow Burn"	✔	–	–	✔
5	James Tutson	31	Iowa City, Iowa	"Beyond"	–	–	–	–
6	Ciana Pelekai	20	Oahu, HI / Las Vegas, NV	"Dance Monkey"	–	✔	✘	–
7	Jose Figueroa Jr.	34	Kissimmee, Florida	"At This Moment"	–	✔	✔	–
8	Halley Greg	29	Seattle, Washington	"I'm Like a Bird"	✔	–	–	–
9	Durell Anthony	34	Kansas / San Diego, CA	"What's Going On"	✔	✔	–	–
10	Jesse Desorcy	29	Burrillville, Rhode Island	"Dust on the Bottle"	–	–	–	–
11	Avery Roberson	20	Rutherfordton, North Carolina	"If You're Reading This"	✔	✔	✔	✔

=== Episode 4 (March 9) ===
Order	Artist	Age	Hometown	Song	Coach's and artist's choices			
Order	Artist	Age	Hometown	Song	Kelly	John	Nick	Blake
1	Connor Christian	23	Gallipolis, Ohio	"Bright Lights"	✔	–	✔	✔
2	Kaitlyn Myers	17	Schwenksville, Pennsylvania	"If You Really Love Me"	–	–	–	–
3	Bradley Sinclair	22	Nashville, TN / Rockford, MI	"Say You Won't Let Go"	✔	–	✔	–
4	Gihanna Zoë	17	Redlands, California	"She Used to Be Mine"	✔	–	✔	–
5	JD Casper	28	Austin, Texas	"How To Save A Life"	✔	–	–	–
6	Deion Warren	28	Conway, North Carolina	"Shallow"	✔	✔	✔	–

=== Episode 5 (March 15) ===
Order	Artist	Age	Hometown	Song	Coach's and artist's choices			
Order	Artist	Age	Hometown	Song	Kelly	John	Nick	Blake
1	Savanna Woods	26	Stanwood, Washington	"Zombie"	✔	–	✔	–
2	Rachel Mac	15	Romeo, Michigan	"Let Him Fly"	–	–	✔	–
3	Almond&Olive (Natalie Alms and Ollie Davidson)	N/A	Chicago, Illinois	"Wildflowers"	–	–	–	–
4	Lindsay Joan	22	San Diego, California	"Nightmare"	–	–	✔	✔
5	Rio Doyle	16	Adrian, Michigan	"When We Were Young"	–	✔	–	–
6	Jordan Matthew Young	34	Austin, Texas	"I'm No Stranger to the Rain"	✔	–	✔	✔
7	Tyler Kohrs	27	Nashville, Tennessee	"More Hearts Than Mine"	–	–	–	–
8	Zania Alaké	34	Detroit, Michigan	"Sweet Love"	✔	✔	–	–
9	Savanna Chestnut	25	Americus, Kansas	"Hold Me Now"	–	–	–	✔
10	Nadia Nicole	20	Fort Lauderdale, Florida	"I Wanna Be Down"	–	–	–	–
11	Anna Grace	20	Milwaukee, Wisconsin	"My Future"	✔	✔	✔	✔

=== Episode 6 (March 22) ===
Order	Artist	Age	Hometown	Song	Coach's and artist's choices			
Order	Artist	Age	Hometown	Song	Kelly	John	Nick	Blake
1	Denisha Dalton	22	Warwick, New York	"Pillowtalk"	✔	✔	–	✔
2	Awari (Julian Awari)	35	Virginia Beach, Virginia	"Weak"	✔	Team full	✔	–
3	Charlotte Boyer	17	Rock Island, Illinois	"Love Is a Losing Game"	–	Team full	Team full	–
4	Keegan Ferrell	21	Fort Wayne, Indiana	"She Will Be Loved"	✔	Team full	Team full	✔
5	Conner Snow	27	Maui, Hawaii	"This City"	–	Team full	Team full	Team full
6	Ainae (Ainae Nielsen)	21	Washington, DC	"Best Part"	✔	Team full	Team full	Team full

== Battles ==
The battles began on March 29, 2021, and concluded on April 12, 2021. The advisors for this round were Luis Fonsi for Team Kelly, Brandy for Team Legend, Darren Criss for Team Nick, and Dan + Shay for Team Blake. In this round, each coach can steal one losing artist from another team and save one losing artist on their own team. However, the team coach may only hit their button to save an artist after it is clear that no other coach is going to steal the artist. Artists who win their battles or are stolen by another coach advance to the Knockouts and saved artists move on to the four-way knockout. Coaches will have five battles each on their team. At the end of this round, only seven artists will remain on each team, five from the battles that were won, and one from a steal and a save respectively. In total, 28 artists advance to the knockouts.

Battles color key
Artist won the Battle and advanced to the Knockouts
Artist lost the Battle, but was stolen by another coach, and, advanced to the Knockouts
Artist lost the Battle, but was saved by their coach, and, advanced to the Four-way Knockout
Artist lost the Battle and was eliminated

Battles results
Episode	Coach	Order	Winner	Song	Loser	'Steal'/'Save' result			
Episode	Coach	Order	Winner	Song	Loser	Kelly (Note: Kelsea Ballerini filled in for Kelly in this round due to her illness.)	John	Nick	Blake
Episode 7 (Monday, March 29, 2021)	Kelly	1	Ryleigh Modig	"pov"	Gean Garcia	N/A	✔	✔	—
Episode 7 (Monday, March 29, 2021)	Blake	2	Connor Christian	"I Ain't Living Long Like This"	Aaron Konzelman	—	Steal used	—	—
Episode 7 (Monday, March 29, 2021)	Nick	3	Dana Monique	"Stuck with U"	Devan Blake Jones	—	Steal used	✔	—
Episode 7 (Monday, March 29, 2021)	John	4	Pia Renee	"Baby"	Christine Cain	—	—	—	—
Episode 7 (Monday, March 29, 2021)	Nick	5	Jose Figueroa Jr.	"You Say"	Awari	—	Steal used	Save used	—
Episode 7 (Monday, March 29, 2021)	Blake	6	Ethan Lively	"Just Got Started Lovin' You"	Avery Roberson	✔	Steal used	—	N/A
Episode 8 (Monday, April 5, 2021)	Blake	1	Cam Anthony	"10,000 Hours"	Emma Caroline	Steal used	Steal used	—	✔
Episode 8 (Monday, April 5, 2021)	Kelly	2	Gihanna Zoë	"Thinking Out Loud"	Halley Greg	—	Steal used	—	—
Episode 8 (Monday, April 5, 2021)	John	3	Zania Alaké	"Emotion"	Durell Anthony	Steal used	—	—	—
Episode 8 (Monday, April 5, 2021)	Blake	4	Jordan Matthew Young	"Calling All Angels"	Keegan Ferrell	Steal used	Steal used	✔	Save used
Episode 8 (Monday, April 5, 2021)	Nick	5	Zae Romeo	"Rewrite the Stars"	Lindsay Joan	Steal used	Steal used	Team full	—
Episode 8 (Monday, April 5, 2021)	John	6	Ciana Pelekai	"You Broke Me First"	Denisha Dalton	Steal used	—	Team full	—
Episode 8 (Monday, April 5, 2021)	Kelly	7	Corey Ward	"Dreams"	Savanna Woods	✔	Steal used	Team full	—
Episode 9 (Monday, April 12, 2021)	John	1	Victor Solomon	"U Got It Bad"	Deion Warren	Team full	—	Team full	—
Episode 9 (Monday, April 12, 2021)	Kelly	2	Anna Grace	"You Know I'm No Good"	Ainae	Team full	Steal used	Team full	—
Episode 9 (Monday, April 12, 2021)	Nick	3	Raine Stern	"Adore You"	Andrew Marshall	Team full	Steal used	Team full	✔
Episode 9 (Monday, April 12, 2021)	Blake	4	Pete Mroz	"Have a Little Faith in Me"	Savanna Chestnut	Team full	Steal used	Team full	Team full
Episode 9 (Monday, April 12, 2021)	Kelly	5	Kenzie Wheeler	"Fishin' in the Dark"	JD Casper	Team full	Steal used	Team full	Team full
Episode 9 (Monday, April 12, 2021)	Nick	6	Rachel Mac	"Your Song"	Bradley Sinclair	Team full	Steal used	Team full	Team full
Episode 9 (Monday, April 12, 2021)	John	7	Rio Doyle	"Somebody That I Used to Know"	Carolina Rial	Team full	✔	Team full	Team full

== Knockouts ==
The knockouts began on April 19, 2021, and concluded on April 26, 2021. Snoop Dogg served as the mega mentor. In this round, each coach can steal one losing artist from another team. Artists who win their knockouts or are stolen by another coach advance to the live playoffs. In addition, each saved artist from the Battles will go head-to-head in the four-way knockout. Results for the head-to-head are decided by the public, with the winner being announced at the start of the live playoffs (episode 13). Only 17 artists in total will remain for the live playoffs, three on each team that won their respective knockouts, one stolen from another coach, and the artist that wins the four-way knockout, who will be added as a fifth artist on one of the coaches’ teams.

Knockouts color key
Artist won the Knockout and advanced to the Live Playoffs
Artist lost the Knockout but was stolen by another coach and advanced to the Live Playoffs
Artist lost the Knockout and was eliminated

Knockouts results
Episode	Coach	Order	Winner		Loser		'Steal' result			
Episode	Coach	Order	Song	Artist	Artist	Song	Kelly	John	Nick	Blake
Episode 10 (Monday, April 19, 2021)	Kelly	1	"Already Gone"	Corey Ward	Ryleigh Modig	"Use Somebody"	N/A	✔	✔	✔
Episode 10 (Monday, April 19, 2021)	Blake	2	"She Talks to Angels"	Jordan Matthew Young	Ethan Lively	"Help Me Hold On"	―	Team full	―	N/A
Episode 10 (Monday, April 19, 2021)	John	3	"What the World Needs Now Is Love"	Pia Renee	Ciana Pelekai	"Cuz I Love You"	―	Team full	―	―
Episode 10 (Monday, April 19, 2021)	Nick	4	"Nutbush City Limits"	Dana Monique	Keegan Ferrell	"Just My Imagination (Running Away with Me)"	―	Team full	N/A	―
Episode 10 (Monday, April 19, 2021)	John	5	"My Girl"	Victor Solomon	Gean Garcia	"Afterglow"	―	Team full	―	―
Episode 10 (Monday, April 19, 2021)	Blake	6	"Before You Go"	Pete Mroz	Andrew Marshall	"I Won't Give Up"	―	Team full	✔	N/A
Episode 11 (Monday, April 26, 2021)	Nick	1	"Foolish Games"	Rachel Mac	Zae Romeo	"Electric Love"	✔	Team full	Team full	—
Episode 11 (Monday, April 26, 2021)	Kelly	2	"Beer Never Broke My Heart"	Kenzie Wheeler	Avery Roberson	"Tomorrow"	Team full	Team full	Team full	—
Episode 11 (Monday, April 26, 2021)	John	3	"If I Were Your Woman"	Zania Alaké	Rio Doyle	"Issues"	Team full	Team full	Team full	—
Episode 11 (Monday, April 26, 2021)	Blake	4	"Feeling Good"	Cam Anthony	Connor Christian	"Youngblood"	Team full	Team full	Team full	N/A
Episode 11 (Monday, April 26, 2021)	Nick	5	"Break Every Chain"	Jose Figueroa Jr.	Raine Stern	"No Such Thing"	Team full	Team full	Team full	—
Episode 11 (Monday, April 26, 2021)	Kelly	6	"Glitter In The Air"	Gihanna Zoë	Anna Grace	"If I Die Young"	Team full	Team full	Team full	✔

4-way knockout results
Episode	Coach	Order	Artist	Song	Result
Episodes 11 and 13 (Monday, April 26 and May 10, 2021)	Blake Shelton	7	Emma Caroline	"Neon Moon"	Eliminated
Episodes 11 and 13 (Monday, April 26 and May 10, 2021)	Nick Jonas	8	Devan Blake Jones	"Sign of the Times"	Advanced
Episodes 11 and 13 (Monday, April 26 and May 10, 2021)	John Legend	9	Carolina Rial	"Anyone"	Eliminated
Episodes 11 and 13 (Monday, April 26 and May 10, 2021)	Kelly Clarkson	10	Savanna Woods	"Black Hole Sun"	Eliminated

== Live Shows ==
Continuing from the previous season, the live shows consist of the live playoffs, semi-finals and finale. After the live playoffs, only the top nine artists remain: one of each team saved by the public and another saved by their coach, with the contestant with the fewest amount of votes being immediately eliminated. Then, the artist with more public votes from each team (out of the two or three who have not been previously chosen) receive a chance to compete in the Wildcard instant save, whose winner is added as a third member on a coach's team. During the semi-finals, the artist with more public votes per team moves on to the finale, and the remaining five compete in the instant save, whose winner also moves on to the finale.

The release of performances' studio version started from the Playoffs and switched back to iTunes and Apple Music after 1 season on YouTube Music. However, downloads or streams no longer count as votes. No performance reached the top 10 on iTunes this season.

Live shows color key
Artist was saved by public's vote
Artist was saved by his/her coach
Artist was not selected to advance nor be eliminated/was selected to be the Wild Card (Live Playoffs only)
Artist was instantly saved
Artist was eliminated

=== Week 1: Playoffs (May 10–11) ===
With the advancement of Corey Ward in the wildcard, this was the second time that Clarkson advanced with three artists in the semi-final, the first being the fifteenth season.

Playoffs results
Episode	Coach	Order	Artist	Song	Result
Episode 13 (Monday, May 10, 2021)	Kelly Clarkson	1	Corey Ward	"Bruises"	Wild Card
Episode 13 (Monday, May 10, 2021)	Kelly Clarkson	2	Gihanna Zoë	"Always Remember Us This Way"	Kelly's choice
Episode 13 (Monday, May 10, 2021)	Kelly Clarkson	3	Zae Romeo	"When I Look at You"	Eliminated
Episode 13 (Monday, May 10, 2021)	Kelly Clarkson	4	Kenzie Wheeler	"Red Dirt Road"	Public's vote
Episode 13 (Monday, May 10, 2021)	John Legend	5	Ryleigh Modig	"Drivers License"	Wild Card
Episode 13 (Monday, May 10, 2021)	John Legend	6	Zania Alaké	"Dangerous Woman"	Eliminated
Episode 13 (Monday, May 10, 2021)	John Legend	7	Pia Renee	"Need U Bad"	John's choice
Episode 13 (Monday, May 10, 2021)	John Legend	8	Victor Solomon	"I Wish"	Public's vote
Episode 13 (Monday, May 10, 2021)	Nick Jonas	9	Dana Monique	"Free Your Mind"	Nick's choice
Episode 13 (Monday, May 10, 2021)	Nick Jonas	10	Andrew Marshall	"Put Your Records On"	Eliminated
Episode 13 (Monday, May 10, 2021)	Nick Jonas	11	Jose Figueroa Jr.	"Talking to the Moon"	Wild Card
Episode 13 (Monday, May 10, 2021)	Nick Jonas	12	Devan Blake Jones	"Shape of My Heart"	Eliminated
Episode 13 (Monday, May 10, 2021)	Nick Jonas	13	Rachel Mac	"Rainbow"	Public's vote
Episode 13 (Monday, May 10, 2021)	Blake Shelton	14	Jordan Matthew Young	"Gold Dust Woman"	Blake's choice
Episode 13 (Monday, May 10, 2021)	Blake Shelton	15	Anna Grace	"Let Her Go"	Eliminated
Episode 13 (Monday, May 10, 2021)	Blake Shelton	16	Pete Mroz	"We Belong"	Wild Card
Episode 13 (Monday, May 10, 2021)	Blake Shelton	17	Cam Anthony	"Take Me to Church"	Public's vote
Episode 14 (Tuesday, May 11, 2021)	Blake Shelton	1	Pete Mroz	"Speechless"	Eliminated
Episode 14 (Tuesday, May 11, 2021)	Nick Jonas	2	Jose Figueroa Jr.	"Superstition"	Eliminated
Episode 14 (Tuesday, May 11, 2021)	Kelly Clarkson	3	Corey Ward	"Lose You to Love Me"	Wild Card Winner
Episode 14 (Tuesday, May 11, 2021)	John Legend	4	Ryleigh Modig	"It Will Rain"	Eliminated

=== Week 2: Semi-finals (May 17–18) ===
On Monday, the Top 9 artists each sang solos of their choosing and then were put into trios to sing songs celebrating from the '70s themed category. The public vote results was announced on Tuesday following the format of 2 previous seasons.

Semi-finals results
Episode	Coach	Order	Artist	Solo Song	'70s Trio Song	Results
Episode 15 (Monday, May 17, 2021)	John Legend	1 (7)	Victor Solomon	"I Can Only Imagine"	"Shining Star"	Public's vote
Episode 15 (Monday, May 17, 2021)	Blake Shelton	2 (9)	Jordan Matthew Young	"Rose Colored Glasses"	"Go Your Own Way"	Not selected
Episode 15 (Monday, May 17, 2021)	John Legend	4 (7)	Pia Renee	"Turn Your Lights Down Low"	"Shining Star"	Not selected
Episode 15 (Monday, May 17, 2021)	Nick Jonas	5 (9)	Rachel Mac	"Human"	"Go Your Own Way"	Public's vote
Episode 15 (Monday, May 17, 2021)	Kelly Clarkson	6 (3)	Corey Ward	"Arcade"	"Fooled Around and Fell in Love"	Not selected
Episode 15 (Monday, May 17, 2021)	Kelly Clarkson	8 (9)	Gihanna Zoë	"Reflection"	"Go Your Own Way"	Not selected
Episode 15 (Monday, May 17, 2021)	Nick Jonas	10 (7)	Dana Monique	"Leave the Door Open"	"Shining Star"	Not selected
Episode 15 (Monday, May 17, 2021)	Blake Shelton	11 (3)	Cam Anthony	"It's So Hard to Say Goodbye to Yesterday"	"Fooled Around and Fell in Love"	Public's vote
Episode 15 (Monday, May 17, 2021)	Kelly Clarkson	12 (3)	Kenzie Wheeler	"He Stopped Loving Her Today"	"Fooled Around and Fell in Love"	Public's vote
Episode 16 (Tuesday, May 18, 2021)	John Legend	1	Pia Renee	"Everything I Wanted"		Eliminated
Episode 16 (Tuesday, May 18, 2021)	Kelly Clarkson	2	Corey Ward	"Iris"		Eliminated
Episode 16 (Tuesday, May 18, 2021)	Nick Jonas	3	Dana Monique	"Caught Up in the Rapture"		Eliminated
Episode 16 (Tuesday, May 18, 2021)	Blake Shelton	4	Jordan Matthew Young	"Drift Away"		Instantly Saved
Episode 16 (Tuesday, May 18, 2021)	Kelly Clarkson	5	Gihanna Zoë	"Someone You Loved"		Eliminated

Non-competition performances
Order	Performer(s)	Song
15.1	Ian Flanigan and Blake Shelton	"Grow Up"
16.1	Jake Hoot and Kelly Clarkson	"I Would've Loved You"
16.2	Masked Wolf	"Astronaut in the Ocean"

=== Week 3: Finale (May 24–25) ===
Coach	Artist	Episode 17 (Monday, May 24, 2021)				Episode 18 (Tuesday, May 25, 2021)		Result
Coach	Artist	Order	Dedication Song	Order	Artistry Song	Order	Duet (with Coach)	Result
Kelly Clarkson	Kenzie Wheeler	6	"The Keeper of the Stars"	1	"Heartland"	13	"When You Say Nothing At All"	Runner-up
John Legend	Victor Solomon	2	"I Can't Make You Love Me"	10	"Freedom"	12	"Someday We'll All Be Free"	Fifth place
Blake Shelton	Jordan Matthew Young	8	"Stay"	3	"Key to the Highway"	14	"All My Ex's Live In Texas"	Third place
Nick Jonas	Rachel Mac	4	"I Hope You Dance"	7	"The Chain"	11	"Best Of You"	Fourth place
Blake Shelton	Cam Anthony	5	"Stand Up"	9	"Wanted Dead or Alive"	15	"She Drives Me Crazy"	Winner

Non-competition performances
Order	Performer(s)	Song
17.1	Blake Shelton	"Minimum Wage"
18.1	Gwen Stefani and Saweetie	"Slow Clap"
18.2	Kelsea Ballerini and Kenzie Wheeler	"Half of My Hometown"
18.3	OneRepublic	"Run"
18.4	Lauren Daigle	"Hold On to Me"
18.5	Snoop Dogg and DJ Battlecat	"Sittin On Blades"
18.6	Justin Bieber	"Peaches" / "Hold On"
18.7	Ben Platt	"Imagine"
18.8	Thomas Rhett	"Country Again"
18.9	Maroon 5	"Beautiful Mistakes"

== Elimination chart ==
Results color key
Winner	Saved by instant save (via Voice App)
Runner-up	Saved by the public
Third place	Saved by their coach
Fourth place	Saved by Wildcard (via Voice App)
Fifth place	Eliminated

Coaches color key
Team Kelly
Team Legend
Team Nick
Team Blake

=== Overall ===
Live shows results per week
Artists	Week 1 Playoffs	Week 2	Week 3 Finale
Cam Anthony	Safe	Safe	Winner
Kenzie Wheeler	Safe	Safe	Runner-up
Jordan Matthew Young	Safe	Safe	3rd Place
Rachel Mac	Safe	Safe	4th Place
Victor Solomon	Safe	Safe	5th Place
Corey Ward	Safe	Eliminated	Eliminated (Week 2)
Dana Monique	Safe	Eliminated	Eliminated (Week 2)
Gihanna Zoë	Safe	Eliminated	Eliminated (Week 2)
Pia Renee	Safe	Eliminated	Eliminated (Week 2)
Jose Figueroa Jr.	Eliminated	Eliminated (Week 1, Wildcard performances)	
Pete Mroz	Eliminated	Eliminated (Week 1, Wildcard performances)	
Ryleigh Modig	Eliminated	Eliminated (Week 1, Wildcard performances)	
Andrew Marshall	Eliminated	Eliminated (Week 1, Playoffs performances)	
Anna Grace	Eliminated	Eliminated (Week 1, Playoffs performances)	
Devan Blake Jones	Eliminated	Eliminated (Week 1, Playoffs performances)	
Zae Romeo	Eliminated	Eliminated (Week 1, Playoffs performances)	
Zania Alaké	Eliminated	Eliminated (Week 1, Playoffs performances)	

=== Per teams ===
Live shows results per team
Artists	Week 1 Playoffs	Week 2	Week 3 Finale
Kenzie Wheeler	Advanced	Advanced	Runner-up
Corey Ward	Advanced	Eliminated	
Gihanna Zoë	Advanced	Eliminated	
Zae Romeo	Eliminated		
Victor Solomon	Advanced	Advanced	Fifth Place
Pia Renee	Advanced	Eliminated	
Ryleigh Modig	Eliminated		
Zania Alaké	Eliminated		
Rachel Mac	Advanced	Advanced	Fourth Place
Dana Monique	Advanced	Eliminated	
Jose Figueroa Jr.	Eliminated		
Devan Blake Jones	Eliminated		
Andrew Marshall	Eliminated		
Cam Anthony	Advanced	Advanced	Winner
Jordan Matthew Young	Advanced	Advanced	Third Place
Pete Mroz	Eliminated		
Anna Grace	Eliminated		

Rank	Coach	Top 9	Top 5
1	Blake Shelton	2	2
2	Kelly Clarkson	3	1
3	Nick Jonas	2	1
4	John Legend	2	1

== Ratings ==
Viewership and ratings per episode of The Voice season 20
No.	Title	Air date	Timeslot (ET)	Rating (18–49)	Viewers (millions)
1	"The Blind Auditions, Season Premiere"	March 1, 2021	Monday 8:00 p.m.	1.1	7.89
2	"The Blind Auditions, Part 2"	March 2, 2021	Tuesday 9:00 p.m.	0.9	6.35
3	"The Blind Auditions, Part 3"	March 8, 2021	Monday 8:00 p.m.	1.0	7.56
4	"The Blind Auditions, Part 4"	March 9, 2021	Tuesday 9:00 p.m.	1.0	6.89
5	"The Blind Auditions, Part 5"	March 15, 2021	Monday 8:00 p.m.	1.1	7.84
6	"The Blind Auditions, Part 6 and Best of Blinds"	March 22, 2021	Monday 8:00 p.m.	0.9	7.06
7	"The Battles Premiere, Part 1"	March 29, 2021	Monday 8:00 p.m.	0.8	6.16
8	"The Battles Premiere, Part 2"	April 5, 2021	Monday 8:00 p.m.	0.8	6.02
9	"The Battles, Part 3"	April 12, 2021	Monday 8:00 p.m.	0.7	5.83
10	"The Knockouts Premiere, Part 1"	April 19, 2021	Monday 8:00 p.m.	0.9	6.42
11	"The Knockouts, Part 2"	April 26, 2021	Monday 8:00 p.m.	0.8	6.80
12	"The Road To Lives - 10th Anniversary Edition"	May 3, 2021	Monday 8:00 p.m.	0.8	5.95
13	"Live Top 17 Performances"	May 10, 2021	Monday 8:00 p.m.	0.7	6.05
14	"Live Top 17 Results"	May 11, 2021	Tuesday 8:00 p.m.	0.6	5.75
15	"Live Top 9 Performances"	May 17, 2021	Monday 8:00 p.m.	0.6	6.19
16	"Live Top 9 Results"	May 18, 2021	Tuesday 8:00 p.m.	0.6	5.45
17	"Live Finale Part 1"	May 24, 2021	Monday 8:00 p.m.	0.7	6.55
18	"Live Finale Part 2"	May 25, 2021	Tuesday 8:00 p.m.	0.8	6.73
