= Cam Anthony =

American singer (born 2001)

- Born: Camren Anthony Sherman; August 19, 2001 (age 24); Philadelphia, Pennsylvania, U.S.
- Occupation: Singer
- Years active: 2013–present

Cam Anthony (born Camren Anthony Sherman, born August 19, 2001) is an American singer who experienced pre-teen success with viral YouTube videos, and later won the FOX revival of Showtime at the Apollo in 2018, and the 20th season of The Voice in 2021, where he was coached by Blake Shelton.

== Early life and viral video success ==
Born in Philadelphia, Anthony was raised singing in a church choir, and sang in commercials for Folgers Coffee as a child. He became a child YouTube star in 2013 at the age of eleven, when his covers of songs such as "When I Was Your Man" by Bruno Mars and "Royals" by Lorde went viral. In January 2014, he was profiled in The Source, which described him as having a "crisp soulful sound that's advanced way beyond his years", and praised his YouTube cover of the Boyz II Men song, "It's So Hard to Say Goodbye to Yesterday".

Anthony was consequently picked to perform "The Star-Spangled Banner" on the Truman Balcony for Barack Obama at the White House Easter Egg Roll in 2014, when he was twelve years old, and appeared on The Ellen DeGeneres Show that same year. During this period, Anthony was pursued for production deals by producers L.A. Reid and Dr. Dre, signing with Dre's Aftermath Entertainment at age 14, after which he "spent the rest of his teen years performing and recording", but never recorded an album.

== Showtime at the Apollo and The Voice ==
Anthony appeared on the 2018 FOX revival of Showtime at the Apollo, winning a headlining show at the Apollo Theatre with his performance of the Bill Withers song, "Ain't No Sunshine". In October 2019, Anthony moved to Los Angeles "to be closer to the heart of the music industry", cutting ties with Aftermath Entertainment the following year. Anthony stated, "I made that step to separate from my label and that same night I got an email from The Voice saying the blind auditions were open for casting calls".

In 2021, Anthony competed on the 20th season of The Voice, appearing in the season premiere on March 1, 2021, and auditioning with the Sam Smith song, "Lay Me Down". With Nick Jonas blocking John Legend in the blind audition, Anthony picked Blake Shelton over Jonas as his coach. He remained a top contender throughout the season, and in the semifinals, Anthony "stunned the crowd with his powerful rendition" of "It's So Hard to Say Goodbye to Yesterday", later noting that the song was special to him due to a family tradition of performing it at funerals of loved ones. For the final round on May 24, he performed the Cynthia Erivo song "Stand Up", and the Bon Jovi song "Wanted Dead or Alive". On May 25, 2021, he won The Voice. Anthony's win earned Shelton his eighth victory as a coach (his second win in three seasons) with Anthony being the fourth African-American male winner and the first winning artist that had another coach blocked in their blind audition. Anthony noted the significance of the date being the one-year anniversary of the murder of George Floyd.

Performances on The Voice
| Stage | Song | Original Artist | Order | Date | Notes |
|---|---|---|---|---|---|
| Blind Auditions | "Lay Me Down" | Sam Smith | 1.3 | March 1, 2021 | 3 chairs turned. John Legend blocked, joined Team Blake |
| Battle Rounds | "10,000 Hours" (vs. Emma Caroline) | Dan + Shay & Justin Bieber | 8.1 | April 5, 2021 | Saved by Coach |
| Knockout Rounds | "Feeling Good" (vs. Connor Christian) | Nina Simone | 11.4 | April 26, 2021 | Saved by Coach |
| Live Playoffs | "Take Me to Church" | Hozier | 13.17 | May 10, 2021 | Saved by the Public |
| Live Semifinals | "It's So Hard to Say Goodbye to Yesterday" | Boyz II Men | 15.8 | May 17, 2021 | Saved by the Public |
| Live Finale | "Stand Up" | Cynthia Erivo | 17.5 | May 24, 2021 | Winner |
| Live Finale | "Wanted Dead or Alive" | Bon Jovi | 17.9 | May 24, 2021 | Winner |
| Live Finale | "She Drives Me Crazy" (Duet with Blake Shelton) | Fine Young Cannibals | 18.15 | May 25, 2021 | Winner |

== After The Voice ==
In the aftermath of his win on The Voice, Anthony again appeared on The Ellen DeGeneres Show on June 2, 2021, noting after footage from his appearance at age 12 was shown that it was a "full circle moment". Anthony was chosen to open the annual Philadelphia Welcome America Festival held in July 2021, sponsored by Wawa, for which Anthony was set to perform alongside the Philly Pops in a lineup also featuring Bebe Rexha and Flo Rida. In October 2021, Anthony returned to the set of The Voice to visit the coaches, including new coach Ariana Grande, and to give advice to performers auditioning for the show.

In January 2022, Anthony was picked to sing the national anthem at the AFC wild card game at Arrowhead Stadium. He again returned to The Voice in May 2023, to perform in a season finale tribute to his retiring coach, Blake Shelton.

Awards and achievements
| Preceded by Carter Rubin | The Voice (American) winner 2021 (Spring) | Succeeded by Girl Named Tom |
| Preceded by "Up from Here" | The Voice (American); Winner's song "Wanted Dead or Alive"; 2021 (Spring) | Succeeded by The Chain |
