= Girl Named Tom =

American folk trio

- Origin: Pettisville, Ohio, U.S.
- Genre: Folk
- Years active: 2019–present
- Labels: Republic; Universal Music Group
- Members: Caleb Liechty; Joshua Liechty; Bekah Liechty
- Website: www.girlnamedtom.com

TikTok information
- Page: girlnamedtom
- Followers: 41,500
- Last updated: April 8, 2026

Girl Named Tom is an American folk sibling trio from Pettisville, Ohio composed of Bekah Grace Liechty (born August 2000), Joshua Liechty (born 1998), and Caleb Liechty (born 1995). They are the winners of season 21 of the American talent competition The Voice, with the distinction of being the first trio on the American version of The Voice to win the competition. They competed on the team coached by Kelly Clarkson, taking her fourth win as a coach.

The band name was inspired by Joshua and Caleb's desire to have another brother and originates from Joshua calling their sister Bekah "Thomas" when she was a baby.

== Career ==
=== 2019–2020: Band formation and Another World ===
Originally intending to go to medical school, all three siblings decided to form a band in 2019.

They released their first single, Barrier Island, independently in November 2019 and their first EP, Another World, the following month.

=== 2021–present: Hits from the Road and The Voice ===
On New Year's Day 2021, they released a second single, Backup Plan. In February, they released their first album, Hits from the Road, an album of covers. They released a holiday single, No Snow for Christmas, the day after the Voice finale, under Republic Records.

Performances on The Voice season 21
Stage	Theme	Song	Original Artist	Order	Date	Notes
Blind Auditions	—N/a	"Helplessly Hoping"	Crosby, Stills, Nash & Young	1.1	Sept. 20, 2021	All chairs turned; Joined Team Kelly
Battles (Top 48)	—N/a	"Seven Bridges Road" (vs. Kinsey Rose)	The Eagles	7.3	Oct. 11, 2021	Saved by Kelly
Knockouts (Top 32)	—N/a	"Wichita Lineman" (vs. Holly Forbes)	Glen Campbell	11.6	Oct. 25, 2021	Saved by Kelly
Live Playoffs (Top 20)	—N/a	"Creep"	Radiohead	15.1	Nov. 8, 2021	Public's vote
Live Top 13	"Dedications"	"Dust in the Wind"	Kansas	17.4	Nov. 15, 2021	Public's vote
Live Top 11	"Fan Week"	"More Hearts Than Mine"	Ingrid Andress	19.2	Nov. 22, 2021	Public's vote
Live Top 10	"Challenge Week"	"Viva la Vida"	Coldplay	21.10	Nov. 29, 2021	Public's vote
Live Semifinals (Top 8)	—N/a	"River"	Joni Mitchell	23.7	Dec. 6, 2021	Public's vote
Live Semifinals (Top 8)	'90s Duet with another act	"Hold On" (with Hailey Mia)	Wilson Phillips	23.10	Dec. 6, 2021	Public's vote
Live Finale (Final 5)	"Upbeat song"	"The Chain"	Fleetwood Mac	25.3	Dec. 13, 2021	Winners
Live Finale (Final 5)	"Ballad"	"Baby Now That I've Found You"	The Foundations	25.8	Dec. 13, 2021	Winners
Live Finale (Final 5)	"Duet with coach"	"Leave Before You Love Me" (with Kelly Clarkson)	Marshmello & Jonas Brothers	26.14	Dec. 14, 2021	Winners

In September 2021, the siblings entered the 21st season of The Voice, auditioning with "Helplessly Hoping" by Crosby, Stills, Nash & Young. All four coaches, Kelly Clarkson, John Legend, Ariana Grande, and Blake Shelton, turned their chairs for them. Their audition was the first audition, as well as the first four-chair turn, of season 21. They chose to become members of Team Kelly. They would go on to advance to finale and win the season on December 14, 2021. They became the first trio to win The Voice.

On November 2, 2022, the siblings announced their second album, One More Christmas, would be released on November 11, 2022. They also shared that they would open for the Pentatonix "A Christmas Spectacular" Tour.

On December 13, 2022, the season finale of The Voice season 22, they performed the title track from their album "One More Christmas." Following the performance, "One More Christmas" reached number one on the iTunes Charts.

== Discography ==
=== Albums ===
List of albums, showing selected details, selected chart positions, and sales figures
Title	Details	Peak chart positions
Title	Details	US
Hits from the Road	Released: February 19, 2021; Label: Independent	—
One More Christmas	Released: November 11, 2022; Label: Republic	—
…Wilder Then	• Released: July 11, 2025	—
…Wilder Then (Live Acoustic Versions)	• Released: September 19, 2025	—
Dust to Dust	• Released: April 2, 2026	—
"—" denotes a recording that did not chart or was not released in that territory

=== Extended plays ===
List of extended plays, showing selected details, selected chart positions, and sales figures
Title	Details	Peak chart positions	Sales
Title	Details	US	Sales
Another World	Released: December 13, 2019; Label: Independent	—	
The Voice: The Season 21 Collection	Released: December 15, 2021; Label: Republic Records	—	
"—" denotes a recording that did not chart or was not released in that territory

=== Singles ===
List of singles, showing year released, selected chart positions, and the name of the album
Title	Year	Peak chart positions	Album
Title	Year	US	Album
"Barrier Island"	2019	—	Another World
"Backup Plan"	2021	—	Non-album single
"Dust in the Wind"	2021	—	The Voice: The Season 21 Collection
"More Hearts Than Mine"	2021	—	The Voice: The Season 21 Collection
"Viva la Vida"	2021	—	The Voice: The Season 21 Collection
"River"	2021	—	The Voice: The Season 21 Collection
"The Chain"	2021	—	The Voice: The Season 21 Collection
"Baby Now That I've Found You"	2021	—	The Voice: The Season 21 Collection
"No Snow for Christmas"	2021	—	Non-album single
"What a View"	2023	—	Non-album single
"—" denotes a recording that did not chart or was not released in that territory

Awards and achievements
Preceded by Cam Anthony	The Voice (American); Winners; 2021 (Fall)	Succeeded by Bryce Leatherwood
Preceded by "Wanted Dead or Alive"	The Voice (American); Winner's song "The Chain"; 2021 (Fall)	Succeeded by T-R-O-U-B-L-E
