= Jason Bare =

American singer

- Bare performing in 2011

Background information
- Born: Jason Michael Bare; November 14, 1975 (age 50); Gastonia, North Carolina, U.S.
- Genres: Christian music
- Occupations: Musician, songwriter
- Instruments: Vocals, piano
- Years active: 1996–present
- Label: Madicah Music
- Website: jasonbare.com

Jason Michael Bare is an American Christian singer. He self-released a 2011 album entitled Beautiful Design. Bare's song "For the First Time" was co-written by Nathan Walters of Plus One fame and reached the No. 1 spot on the Christian Music Weekly Worship chart and made it into the Top 30 of Billboard's Soft AC/Inspirational chart during December 2010. The album's lead single, "You Found Me" was released on March 11, 2010. The album produced two additional singles, "Beautiful Design" and "Blame". Bare completed and released a Christmas EP in November 2011. The album's lead single "Have You Heard" was co-written with American Idol alumni singer Felicia Barton.

Jason spent a majority of 2012 and 2013 promoting and touring. He has guest lead worship at some of the nation's largest ministries to include Saddleback Church in (Irvine, CA – Rick Warren). During this time, he also released three singles, "Hope Again," co-written with Loren & Felicia Barton, "You Never Change," co-written with Nathan Walters and Gabe Combs and a Christmas single "What Child Is This?"

In March 2014, Jason digitally released his latest album "Love Is Alive,". The first single from the new album was, "More Than Enough."

In May 2016, Jason signed a new record deal with Daywind Music Group / Vital Records, and released a brand new Christmas EP titled, "Night of Wonder" in December 2016, and a new full-length worship album, "Fearless" March 3, 2017. Jason is currently on tour throughout the U.S.

== Early life ==
Jason was born in Gastonia, North Carolina, to Mike and Reba Bare. He is the elder of two sons; his younger brother, Phillip, is a pastor at Relevant Church Ministries in Gastonia.

Jason is a Christian and has served as music director at the Freedom Worship Center in Gastonia, and as music director at Kingdom Life Ministries in Chesapeake, Virginia. Jason has participated in Christian missionary work around the world; including work in Trinidad, Jamaica and South Africa.

Jason's interest in music began very early. He began playing the piano and singing at the age of five years. In high school, along with fellow singers Christy Bowie and Stefanie Huffstetler, he formed a group called "Rhema". As a trio, they performed at several state competition vocal performances, and traveled throughout the southeastern United States performing at various musical venues, which included a performance with the southern gospel group "The Talleys".

In 1993, at the age of 17, Jason entered a singing competition in Shenandoah Valley with two church friends, performing under the name Wholehearted. The group won first place in the competition, resulting in the release of a single on National Christian Radio titled "Do We Care".

In 1994, after graduating high school, Jason was selected as one of 20 other top vocalist between the ages of 15 and 19 to tour as part of the American Christian Youth Chorale, Reach America tour. Under the direction of Dr. and Mrs. Goida the group embarked on a 35-day national tour.

=== Education ===
After high school, Jason moved to Cleveland, Tennessee to attend Lee University, where he was a vocal performance major and a member of The Lee Singers performance group. It was during this time that Jason began song writing. Along with college roommate Shawn Smith, Jason penned a song titled "Lord Send the Wind." This led to his first full solo self-titled project with the Gaither Music Company in 1996. The subsequent album produced national attention on Christian radio with the single "Worth It".

== Career ==
=== Over the Edge (EP) (2009–2010) ===
It was a song co-written with his close cousin Amanda, which inspired the song "Story of Grace". Amanda had battled addictions much of her life, when it finally seemed that Amanda was turning a corner and getting her life together. At age 27, she died suddenly of a medically induced drug overdose. That same day, while packing to leave for the funeral, Bare found the song he had written with her.

"I had searched for that song for years," says Jason. "And when I found it on the exact day she died, I knew it had to be a God-thing. I told her parents I had found it, and they asked me to sing it for her funeral. I wanted to put that song on the new CD so that Amanda's life would be a beacon of hope for people. It also became a catalyst for me to get serious about music and use my life to make a difference for other people."

This was the foundation of what would eventually become Bare's "Over the Edge (EP)". The album also included the track " I Want to Feel You" co-written by Felicia Barton.

==== Track listing ====
No.	Title	Length
1.	"Story of Grace (Amanda's Song)"	5:33
2.	"Over the Edge"	4:04
3.	"I Want to Feel You"	3:37
4.	"My Oil of Praise"	4:34

=== Beautiful Design (2011–Present) ===
Jason Bare wrote and produced an album entitled Beautiful Design, along with Loren Barton (Coko, Felicia Barton) and Nathan Walters. Bare stated the title song of the CD reflects his new-found courage of conviction. He explains, "I've struggled for many years with a low self-confidence and a fear that I was unable to accomplish what I believed was God's calling on my life. This song reflects the realization that I am God's creation and His design never fails. I hope it reminds listeners that they are fearfully and wonderfully made and encourages them to ask God to paint in them what He would have them to be."

The single "For The First Time," hit the No. 1 spot on the Christian Music Weekly Worship chart and made it into the Top 30 of Billboard's Soft AC/Inspirational chart during December 2010.

==== Track listing ====
No.	Title	Length
1.	"You Found Me"	3:26
2.	"Beautiful Design"	4:14
3.	"Touch the Sky"	4:29
4.	"Blame"	3:57
5.	"Story of Grace (Amanda's Song)"	5:33
6.	"I Can't Escape You"	5:44
7.	"I Want to Feel You"	3:37
8.	"Freely"	4:01
9.	"Walk Before Me"	3:57
10.	"over the hedge"	4:04
11.	"For the First Time (Bonus Track)"	4:41

=== Have You Heard (2011) ===
Jason completed a Christmas EP titled "Have You Heard" which was released November 21, 2011. The album was produced by Nathan Walters and Gabe Combs of Multitone Musik, Geron Davis and Loren Barton.

When coming up with the album's concept, Bare stated, "I wrote my first Christmas song almost 20 years ago," Bare says, "and since that time it has been a vision of mine to release a Christmas project. The birth of Christ is, to me, the most beautiful story ever told and I want the music in this project to convey that. We have spent hours upon hours of time writing and creating a record that will bring the mystery and the beauty of Christmas to life to everyone that hears it."

The album's lead single "Have You Heard" has reached No. 8 ranking on the Christian Music Weekly Christmas chart. The single also made its mark on Billboard's Soft A/C/Inspirational Chart as the No. 1 Most Added Song, No. 2 with Most Increased Spins and No. 3 on the New & Active Song list. The music video for the single was released on December 12, 2011.

==== Track listing ====
No.	Title	Length
1.	"Have You Heard"	3:46
2.	"The Night When Hope Was Born"	4:00
3.	"What Child Is This"	3:48
4.	"A Way In a Manger"	4:08
5.	"For the First Time"	4:41

=== Love is Alive (2014) ===
Jason's 2014 album was produced by Aaron Rice & Luke Buishas and was Co-written by Ian Eskelin (Dove award winning producer/songwriter), Michael Farren (Pocket Full of Rocks), Aaron Rice (Grammy nominated songwriter for artist like Toby Mac & Mandisa), Jennie Lee Riddle (Revelation Song), and several others.

==== Track listing ====
No.	Title	Length
1.	"God of All"	4:30
2.	"More Than Enough"	3:37
3.	"When I'm Found in You"	4:10
4.	"Lamb of God"	5:40
5.	"Light of Your Love"	3:28
6.	"Let it Be Praise"	4:01
7.	"Love is Alive (Feat. Jeannie Ortega)"	3:36
8.	"Bigger"	3:45
9.	"Everlasting God"	4:06
10.	"He Took My Place"	4:32
11.	"Miracle Maker (Feat. Jennifer McGill)"	4:18

== Discography ==
- Jason Michael Bare (album) (1996)
- Starlight – A Christmas Cantata (album) (2004)
- Over the Edge (EP) (2009)
- Beautiful Design (album) (2011)
- Have you Heard (EP) (2011)
- Love is Alive (album) (2014)
- Following You (EP) (2015)
- Night of Wonder (EP) (2016)
- Fearless (Jason Bare album) (2017)

=== Music videos ===
Year	Video	Director
2011	"You Found Me"	Stephen Yake
2011	"Have You Heard"	Dan Ostrem & Andy Didway
2014	"More Than Enough"	Daniel Whisnant – Suissemade
2014	"Christmas All The Time"	Daniel Whisnant – Suissemade

== Personal life ==
Jason married his high school sweetheart Kelli on September 14, 1996. The two began dating back in Bare's junior year of high school. They have two children, a son Micah and daughter Madison.
