= John Holiday =

American operatic countertenor (born 1985)

- Born: John Thomas Holiday, Jr. 31 March 1985 (age 41); Houston, Texas
- Education: Juilliard School (ADOS; University of Cincinnati College-Conservatory of Music (MM); Southern Methodist University (BM)
- Occupations: Operatic countertenor; crossover artist; singer; Professor of music
- Spouses: Paul Gater (m. 2013, divorced); DeMario Adams (m. 2022)
- Website: Official website

John Thomas Holiday Jr. (born March 31, 1985) is an American operatic countertenor. His repertoire focuses on the Baroque and contemporary composers, including staged opera and opera in concert, works for voice and orchestra, and experimental mixed-media. He has participated in several world premieres. He has performed with several opera companies in the United States, toured with the Los Angeles Philharmonic, and sung in Shanghai and several European cities. He also sings gospel, pop, and jazz; he was a contestant on season 19 of NBC's The Voice, a vocal competition television series.

== Early life ==
Holiday was born in 1985 in Rosenberg, Greater Houston, in Fort Bend County, Texas, to John Holiday, Sr., a welder, and Waverly A. Holiday, a homemaker, who sang and played clarinet. His maternal grandmother, Sandra Mathis Franklin, was the pianist and music director at Missionary Baptist Church. He taught himself to play piano by imitating her, and later the organ. While only 6 or 7 years old he sang solos in church and at Travis Elementary School. He won a spot in the Fort Bend Boys Choir, which led to appearances as a treble soloist in the Houston Symphony's performances of Berlioz's La Damnation de Faust with Denyce Graves in the role of Marguérite. He later said, "I'd never seen anyone who looked like me doing what she did. I'd never thought of being an opera singer. To tell the truth, I didn't know that world even existed. I decided that was what I wanted to do."

Holiday graduated from Lamar Consolidated High School in Rosenberg. For two of his high school years he was the first chair tenor in the All-State Mixed Choir sponsored by the Texas Music Educators Association. The University Interscholastic League designated him one of the Most Outstanding Performers in Texas.

== Education and vocal training ==
He studied at Southern Methodist University (SMU) from 2003 to 2007, earning a bachelor of music degree in vocal performance. While a student at SMU, he won first place at the TEXOMA region of the National Association of Teachers of Singing several times. Though SMU presented few performance opportunities for a countertenor, in 2005 he did sing the role of Gherardino in the school's production of Puccini's Gianni Schicchi. He won the Concerto Competition of SMU's Meadows School of the Arts in 2007.

He spent the academic year 2007–2008 studying voice at Indiana University's Jacobs School of Music. He then returned to Rosenberg and taught Choral Music and Voice at Lamar Junior High School and Lamar Consolidated High School from August 2008 to December 2009. He returned to vocal studies, now at the University of Cincinnati College-Conservatory of Music where he earned a master's degree in vocal performance in 2012. There he performed the role of Tolomeo in Handel's Giulio Cesare in Egitto under conductor Mark Gibson. In May 2011, he took first place in the Dallas Opera Guild Competition. He spent the summer of that year with the Santa Fe Opera Apprentice program for singers.

He next enrolled at Juilliard, studied with Marlena Malas and Stephen Wadsworth, and obtained his Artist Diploma in Opera Studies in 2014.

He later said his models in the countertenor repertoire were Andreas Scholl and Derek Lee Ragin.

== Career in opera ==
Holiday made his Carnegie Hall debut in October 2012, performing Bernstein's Chichester Psalms with the Atlanta Symphony under Robert Spano. He made his debut at Portland Opera in the role of 1st Oracle and 1st Cardinal in Kevin Newbury's 2012 production of Galileo Galilei by Philip Glass under the baton of maestra Anne Manson. He reprised those roles in his 2013 debut at the Cincinnati Opera.

In 2013 he took on the title role in the James Darrah production of Radamisto at the Juilliard School. At Wolf Trap Opera that year he performed the title role in Giulio Cesare in Egitto. In 2014, he also made his Los Angeles Opera debut as the Sorceress in the Barrie Kosky production of Henry Purcell's Dido and Aeneas.

In 2015, he originated the role of Male Soloist No. 1 in the world premiere of Huang Ruo's Paradise Interrupted at the Spoleto Festival USA, a role he repeated in New York at the Lincoln Center Festival in 2016 and in Shanghai for the Art Macau Festival.

At the Glimmerglass Festival in the summer of 2015, he sang the role of Giulio Cesare in Tazewell Thompson's production of Antonio Vivaldi's Catone in Utica. He returned to sing the title role in Handel's Xerxes in the summer of 2017. In November 2015, he joined Parnassus Arts in concert performances of Giovanni Battista Pergolesi's Adriano in Siria in Versailles and Krakow.

In January 2017, he won the Marian Anderson Vocal Award. In September 2017, he sang in the Opera Philadelphia world premiere of Daniel Bernard Roumain's chamber opera We Shall Not Be Moved. He repeated that performance at the Dutch National Opera in March 2018, his European debut. He then sang Bernstein's Chichester Psalms on tour with Gustavo Dudamel and the Los Angeles Philharmonic in New York, London, and Paris.

In December 2019 he performed the alto part in Handel's Messiah with the Lucerne Symphony Orchestra.

In February 2020 he sang in the world premiere of Matthew Aucoin's Eurydice at the Los Angeles Opera. He made his Metropolitan Opera debut in that opera in December 2021.

Though the COVID-19 pandemic forced the cancellation of many of his scheduled performances, his recital at New York's Metropolitan Museum of Art was presented as a virtual concert. Holiday combined Italian baroque arias with works by Black composers in conjunction with the museum's exhibit of paintings by Jacob Lawrence called "The American Struggle".

In November 2022 he sang the roles of Man Under the Arch and Hotel Clerk in the world stage premiere of Kevin Puts's The Hours at the Metropolitan Opera.

Since 2023, Holiday has served as associate professor of voice at the University of Maryland School of Music. Holiday was previously an associate professor of music at the Conservatory of Music at Lawrence University from 2017-2023. He is a member of the National Association of Teachers of Singing (NATS), the American Guild of Musical Artists (AGMA). and The National Academy of Recording Arts and Sciences

== Other music ==
Holiday has performed jazz and gospel music throughout his career. In 2006, he opened for Grammy award winner Jason Mraz at the McFarlon Auditorium in Dallas. He released a jazz album entitled "The Holiday Guide" that year as well.

In 2018, he sang the national anthem at a basketball game between the Houston Rockets and the Golden State Warriors at the Toyota Center.

In October 2020, he auditioned successfully for a contestant's spot on NBC's The Voice, where he was coached by John Legend. He came in fifth place in the final.

He has released 3 pop singles, “Alive in Me”, “Waste Mine”, and “Love Finds a Way”, the latter also receiving a remix by Houston-based DJ Riddler. All songs were produced by Rob Grimaldi, best known for co-writing and co-producing the BTS song “Butter”.

== Personal life ==
Holiday has identified as gay since he was a teenager. On February 4, 2013, he married his husband, Paul Gater. As of 2021, he is divorced from Gater. He got engaged to fellow The Voice contestant Rio Souma (real name DeMario Adams) in the summer of 2021, and married on July 30, 2022. The couple currently live in Bowie, Maryland. He was represented by Columbia Artists Management until 2018. He has been represented since that time by Fletcher Artist Management. March 31 has been named "John Holiday Day" in Fort Bend County, Texas.

He is the second cousin of the former Vice President of Major League Baseball Jimmie Lee Solomon.

== Major performances ==
=== Opera ===
- Metropolitan Opera (The Hours – world premiere, Eurydice (Aucoin))
- Bayerische Staatsoper (Agrippina)
- Lyric Opera of Chicago (Proximity – world premiere)
- Los Angeles Opera (Dido and Aeneas, Eurydice – world premiere)
- Philadelphia Opera (We Shall Not Be Moved – world premiere)
- Dallas Opera (Flight)
- Des Moines Metro Opera (A Midsummer Night's Dream, Flight)
- Quantum Theatre (Idaspe – American premiere)
- Pittsburgh Opera (We Shall Not Be Moved)
- Wolf Trap Opera (Giulio Cesare)
- Glimmerglass Opera Catone in Utica (Vivaldi) Xerxes)
- Cincinnati Opera (Galileo Galilei)
- Spoleto Festival USA (Paradise Interrupted – world premiere)
- National Kaohsiung Center for the Arts (We Shall Not Be Moved)
- Apollo Theater (We Shall Not Be Moved)
- Dutch National Opera (We Shall Not Be Moved, Agrippina)
- Boston Baroque (Giulio Cesare)
- Juilliard Opera (Radamisto)
- Portland Opera (Galileo Galilei)
- University of Cincinnati College-Conservatory of Music (Giulio Cesare)
- MGM Cotai (Paradise Interrupted)
- Komische Oper Berlin (Akhnaten (opera))

=== Orchestra ===
- New York Philharmonic (Messiah), Chichester Psalms)
- Los Angeles Philharmonic (Chichester Psalms)
- Phoenix Symphony (Chichester Psalms)
- Saint Paul Chamber Orchestra (Messiah)
- Lucerne Symphony Orchestra (Messiah)
- Nashville Symphony Orchestra (Messiah)
- San Antonio Symphony (Messiah)
- Juilliard Orchestra (And Farewell Goes Out Sighing (Giya Kancheli)
- Master Voices NYC (Israel in Egypt (Handel))

Tours in America, France and the U.K. with ‘'Gustavo Dudamel and Los Angeles Philharmonic (Chichester Psalms)

== Awards ==
Award	Competition	Year
Honoree	Yerba Buena Center For The Arts YBCA 100	2018
Winner	Marian Anderson Vocal Award	2017
Third Place	Operalia	2014
Richard F. Gold Career Grant	Shoshanna Foundation	2014
Sarah Tucker Career Grant	The Richard Tucker Foundation Competition	2014
First Place	The Gerda Lissner Foundation International Vocal Competition	2013
Third Place	Licia Albanese International Vocal Competition	2013
Third Place	Giulio Gari International Vocal Competition	2013
Encouragement Award	The George London Foundation Competition	2012
First Place	The Dallas Opera Guild Vocal Competition	2011
Top Award	Sullivan Foundation Auditions	2011
Anna Case MacKay Award	The Santa Fe Opera	2011
Fifth Place	Palm Beach Opera Competition	2011

== Leadership roles ==
- Board of Trustees, Opera Parallele
- Board of Trustees, Bruce Foote Foundation
- Meadows 2050 Council, Meadows School of The Arts
