= RPW =

RPW may refer to:

- Real Pro Wrestling
- Regulative principle of worship
- Revolution Pro Wrestling
