= Shoreham-Wading River High School =

Location
- 250B Route 25A; Shoreham, New York 11786; United States; 40.941695°N 72.866971°W

Information
- Type: Public school (US)
- Established: September 1975
- School district: Shoreham-Wading River Central School District
- Superintendent: Gerard Poole
- Principal: Frank Pugliese
- Faculty: 63.05 (FTE)
- Grades: 9–12
- Enrollment: 708 (2022-23)
- Student to teacher ratio: 11.23
- Colors: Navy Blue and Gold
- Mascot: Wildcat
- Website: Shoreham-Wading River High School official page

Shoreham-Wading River High School is a public secondary school located in Shoreham, New York. The school serves about 800 students in grades 9 to 12 in the Shoreham-Wading River Central School District.

== Overview ==
The school colors are navy blue and gold, and the mascot is the wildcat. The North Shore Public Library is connected to the school building.

The Wildcat Pause, the school's official newspaper, has won many awards over the years.

Among the school's second language courses is American Sign Language. Several advanced placement courses are offered as well, including AP US History, AP Calculus AB and AP Computer Science A.

== Notable alumni ==
- D. B. Sweeney, actor
- Keith Osik, Major League Baseball player
- Jesse Jantzen, NCAA Wrestling Champion
- Adam Conover, stand-up comedian
- Carter Rubin, pop singer, winner of season 19 on NBC's The Voice
- Eric Anthony Lopez, actorThe Phantom of The Opera on Broadway & Disney’s Chang Can Dunk film series

== Athletics ==
The Shoreham-Wading River Boys' Cross Country team claimed victory at the NYS Class B Championships 2007.

Established in the late 1990s the Shoreham-Wading River lacrosse program has built strong reputation as a dominant force in the sport. In the 2006–2007 season, both the boys' and girls' lacrosse teams emerged victorious at the NYS Class C Championship, a notable achievement that solidified their place in the annals of high school sports history. The boys' team continued their success by clinching State Championships in 2002, 2007, 2012 and 2020. Similarly, the girls' team displayed their exceptional skills by securing consecutive titles in 2008, 2009, and 2010.

In 2014, the Wildcats football team made significant strides by winning the inaugural Rutgers Cup, an accolade that positioned them as the premier public football team on Long Island. Their triumph extended to claiming their first Long Island championship in 2014, followed by successful title defenses in 2015 and 2016, culminating in back-to-back-to-back championships. However, the joy of victory was tempered by tragedy when Thomas Cutinella, a dedicated member of the varsity football team, died due to a head injury sustained during a game at John Glenn High School in Elwood on October 2, 2014. In his memory, Shoreham-Wading River High School honored Cutinella by dedicating its main athletic field as the Thomas Cutinella Memorial Field.
