= Newark Boys Chorus =

Boys' choir based in Newark, New Jersey, US

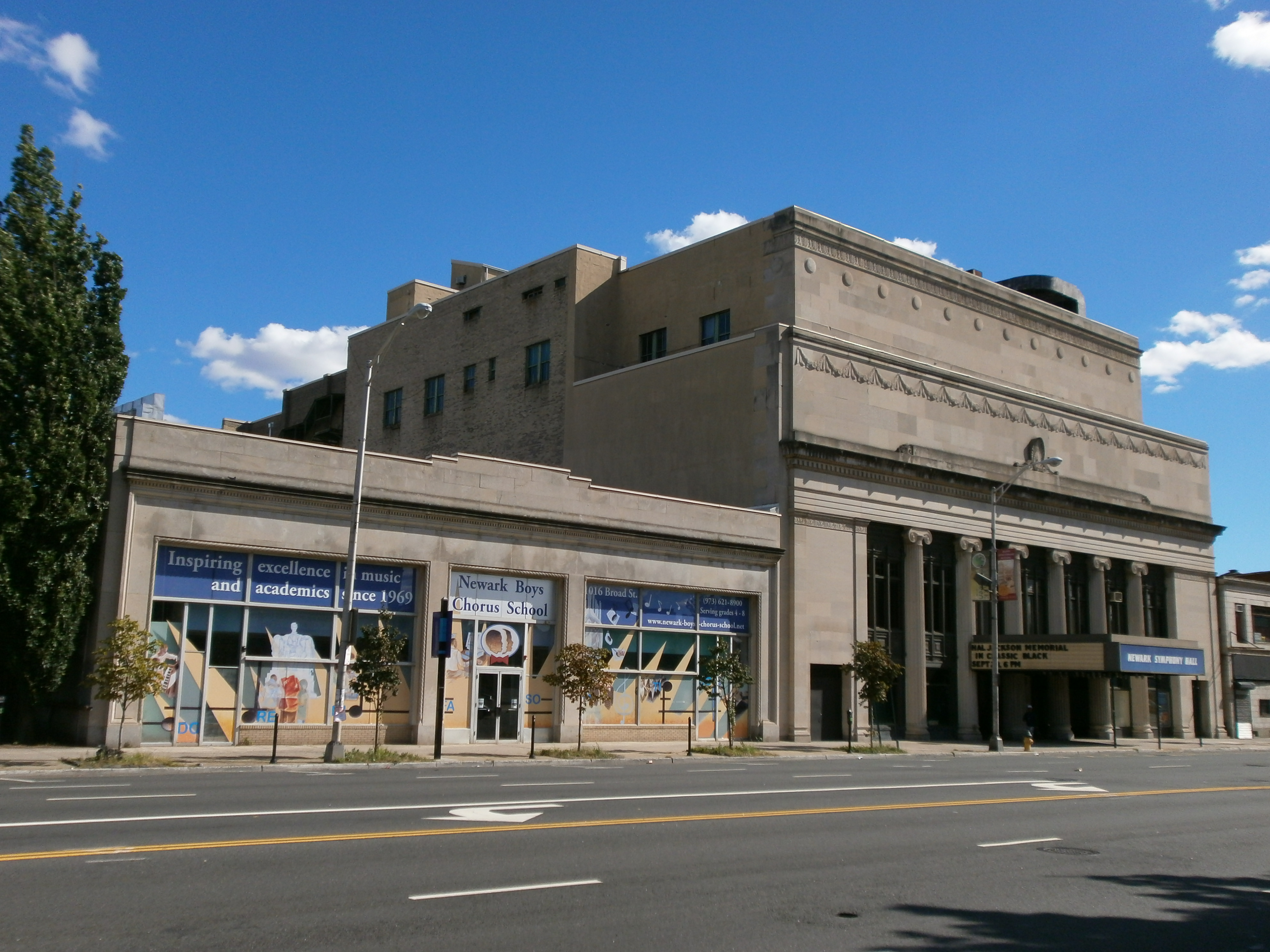
Boys Chorus School and Newark Symphony Hall

The Newark Boys Chorus was a boys' choir based in Newark, New Jersey. The choir was founded as the New Jersey Symphony Boys Choir in 1966. In 1969, the choir led to the establishment of the Newark Boys Chorus School. The group toured regularly in the United States and abroad.

With enrollment declining to less than 20 and with the failure to meet a fundraising target of $500,000, the school announced its closure in November 2007 and the end of the operation of the chorus.

In May 2026, an effort was announced that would reinstitute the chorus school as a charter school for both boys and girls. The charter would require state approval, and once authorized would start with a first grade and add a grade each year in subsequent years until it served through eighth grade.

== Debut ==
The chorus was formed with the New Jersey Symphony who needed “angels’ voices” for the “Dance of the Snowflakes” in their production of Tchaikowsky’s “The Nutcracker”. It was James R. McCarthy who undertook the task and found 66 “angels” for use in the production. On December 26, 1966, the chorus finally joined the New Jersey Symphony and the Garden State Ballet in a complete production of the Nutcracker.

The chorus’s debut performance at Newark Symphony Hall was so successful and received such critical acclaim, that additional performances were demanded, which ultimately led to the opening of the Newark Boys Choir School on September 15, 1969. In September 1972, the school adopted the name Newark Boys Choir, which later became the Newark Boys Chorus School.

== Performances and guest appearances ==
The group's music includes traditional classical music, spirituals, folk music, and jazz. Since its founding the boys choir has toured nationally and internationally including to such countries as Japan, Latvia, Finland, France, Switzerland, the Caribbean, Russia, Australia, Spain and Portugal. The Newark Boys Chorus has performed in prestigious venues such as Carnegie Hall, Kennedy Center for the Performing Arts, Lincoln Center, and the New Jersey Performing Arts Center. The chorus is also involved in many boychoir festivals across the east coast including The Georgia Boy Choir Festival, the Maryland State Boychoir Festival, and Keystone State Boy choir's B1K (Boy choir of One-thousand), a boychoir festival which consist of one thousand male singers, most of whom are a part of boy choirs throughout the United States.

In the 1970s the group commissioned works by Gian Carlo Menotti and Peter Mennin which premiered at Alice Tully Hall. and recorded the Blue Öyster Cult song, "The Golden Age of Leather", on their album Spectres. In October 2007, the Chorus sang in the first public performance at the new Prudential Center. The chorus accompanied the musician Sting in singing a lullaby in his 2009 appearance at Cathedral of St. John the Divine. In December 2011, the group appeared on Fox News with its repertoire of holiday classics.

== Newark Boys Chorus School ==
The Newark Boys Chorus School, founded in 1969, is a private school fully accredited by the Middle States Association of Colleges and Schools providing academic and musical education for young urban men from the greater Newark area." The school's accreditation status was extended for ten years in Fall 2018.

== Notable alumni ==
- Derek Lee Ragin (born 1958), countertenor
- Anwar Robinson (born 1979), finalist in the fourth season of the television show American Idol
