= Riccardo Broschi =

Italian composer

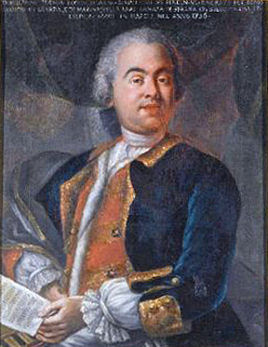
Riccardo Broschi

Riccardo Broschi (c. 1698 – 1756) was a composer of baroque music and the brother of the opera singer Carlo Broschi, known as Farinelli.

== Life ==
Broschi was born in Apulia, Kingdom of Naples, the son of Salvatore Broschi, a composer and chapelmaster of Andria Cathedral, and Caterina Berrese (according to the Book of Baptisms of the Church of S. Nicola, today near the Episcopal Archives).

The Broschi family moved to Naples at the end of 1711, and enrolled Riccardo, their firstborn, in the Conservatory of S. Maria di Loreto, where he would study to become a composer under G. Perugino and F. Mancinipresso. Salvatore died unexpectedly at the age of 36, on 4 November 1717. Caterina subsequently made Riccardo head of the family.

He made his debut in 1725 with La Vecchia Sorda. Next, he moved to London in 1726 and stayed there until 1734 and wrote six heroic operas, his most successful being Artaserse. In 1737, he moved to Stuttgart and briefly served at the court of Charles Alexander, Duke of Württemberg, then returned to Naples before joining his brother in Madrid in 1739. He died in Madrid.

== Selected works ==
- La Vecchia Sorda (Naples, 1725)
- L’Isola Di Alcina (Rome, 1728)
- Idaspe (25 January 1730, Teatro San Giovanni Grisostomo)
  - Ombra fedele anch'io ("As a faithful shadow I'll be"), aria for soprano castrato
- Arianna e Teseo (Milan, 1731)
- Merope (Turin, 1732)
- Artaserse (London, 1734 - in collaboration with Johann Adolf Hasse)
  - Pallido il sole ("The sun is pale"), mad scene aria for soprano castrato (by Hasse)
- Nerone (Rome, 1735)
- Adriano in Siria (Milan, 1735)

== Broschi on screen ==
The dramatic relationship between the Broschi brothers is the quintessence of the movie Farinelli (1994), in which a few of his works are performed.
