= Ewa Malas-Godlewska =

Polish opera singer

Ewa Małas-Godlewska (Polish pronunciation: [ˈɛva ˈmawas ɡɔdˈlɛfska], born 23 January 1957) is a Polish lyric coloratura soprano, residing in France. An accomplished opera singer, she graduated from the Wroclaw PWSM, being noted for her unique interpretation of Baroque music.

She contributed her voice for the soundtrack of the 1994 film Farinelli, where she identified herself as Ewa Malas-Godlewska. Her voice was electronically blended with that of countertenor Derek Lee Ragin to recreate the famous castrato's voice. The only non-blended recording of Małas-Godlewska on the Farinelli soundtrack is the aria Lascia ch'io pianga by George Frideric Handel.

== Discography ==
Title	Album details	Peak chart positions	Certifications
Title	Album details	POL	Certifications
Witaj gwiazdo złota (with Grzegorz Turnau)	Released: 1998; Label: Mag Music; Formats: CD, digital download	—	POL: Platinum
Fuego	Released: 2000; Label: Warner Music Poland; Formats: CD	—	
Era of Love (with José Cura)	Released: 2000; Label: Warner Music Poland; Formats: CD	2	POL: Platinum
Song of Love (with Jose Cura)	Released: May 12, 2003; Label: BMG Poland; Formats: CD, digital download	—	POL: Platinum
Sentiments	Released: June 12, 2006; Label: Polskie Radio/Fonografika; Formats: CD, digital download	9	POL: Gold
"—" denotes a recording that did not chart or was not released in that territory.
