= Jesse Jantzen =

American wrestler and investor (born 1982)

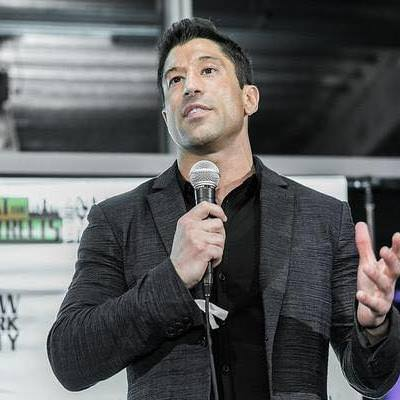
- Jantzen in 2018

Personal information
- Born: February 5, 1982 (age 44) Shoreham, New York, U.S.
- Education: Harvard University
- Occupations: Investor & Film Producer
Medal record
Men's freestyle wrestling
Representing the United States
University World Games
Gold medal – first place	2005 Izmir	66 kg
Men's collegiate wrestling
Representing the Harvard Crimson
NCAA Division I Championships
Gold medal – first place	2004 St. Louis	149 lb
Bronze medal – third place	2002 Albany	149 lb
Bronze medal – third place	2003 Kansas City	149 lb

Jesse Jantzen (born February 5, 1982) is the founder of Skylar James Capital, a multi-strategy family office. Previously Jantzen was a portfolio manager at Clearview Capital Management and held positions at Perella Weinberg Partners and W Holding Company LLC and as an assistant coach for Harvard University. Jantzen currently sits on the board of the fetal center for the Children’s Hospital of Philadelphia (CHOP) and the Beat the Streets (BTS) organization. He is also a former freestyle and folkstyle wrestler.

He was a graduate of Shoreham Wading River High School. He was the first four-time state champion and six-time state place winner in New York State wrestling history. In 2000, he was the Asics High School Wrestler of the Year and was named the Junior Hodge Trophy winner the same year.

Jantzen received an A.B from Harvard University in 2004. He was a three-time All-American and 2004 National Champion and Outstanding Wrestler award winner. In 2005 Jantzen won a World Championship at the University World Games in Izmir, Turkey in Freestyle wrestling at 66 kg. Jantzen participated in the Real Pro Wrestling league representing the New York Outrage. He is the most decorated Harvard Wrestler in history and was a 2004 Bingham Award winner for Harvard’s best athlete. Some detractors suggested that because of his reliance on mat wrestling, he would not fare well in freestyle, which focuses on takedowns. Jantzen developed a series of moves on top known as the “Jantzen Ride.” Career record at Harvard 132-13, 3-time All-American (1st, 3rd, 3rd). Jantzen competed in the 2008 Olympic Trials but fell short of his goal of making the Beijing Olympics. Jantzen is a member of the Harvard Varsity Club Hall of Fame, EIWA Conference Hall of Fame and Suffolk County Hall of fame.

Jantzen has had involvement with several Film/TV projects (Foxcatcher, Dixieland, The Knick, Team Foxcatcher) as an actor, producer, financier and stunt coordinator. Movie critic Justin Chang described Jantzen’s choreographed wrestling scenes for Foxcatcher as “superbly convincing”.

Jantzen lives and works in downtown Manhattan. Jantzen is one of five children. His younger brother, Corey, was also an accomplished wrestler for Harvard University and Shoreham Wading River High School. Corey worked with Jantzen on both Foxcatcher and Dixieland, where he had credited roles in each film.
