= Carter Rubin =

American musical artist (born 2005)

- Born: October 11, 2005 (age 21); Shoreham, New York, U.S.
- Genres: Pop; CCM
- Occupation: Singer
- Instrument: Vocals
- Years active: 2020–present
- Label: Republic

Carter Rubin (born October 11, 2005) is an American pop singer. He is the winner of season 19 of the American talent competition The Voice at the age of 15. He has the distinction of being the youngest male winner and the second youngest winner overall. He competed on the team coached by Gwen Stefani, giving Stefani her first win as a coach on the show.

Rubin released his debut EP, i still know nothing, in 2024 which features six singles.

== Early and personal life ==
Carter Rubin was born on October 11, 2005, and raised in Shoreham, New York. He was born into a musical family; his grandfather played guitar and provided backup vocals for the band Jay and the Americans in the 1960s. His older brother, Jack (born 2001), was diagnosed with autism at the age of two, which led to his mother, Alonna, opening Families in Arms, a nonprofit autism foundation at which he performs, that raises money to send families like Rubin's to Walt Disney World. After graduating from Shoreham-Wading River High School, Rubin moved with his family to Nashville, Tennessee to further his music career.

== Career ==
=== 2020: The Voice ===
In 2020, Rubin entered the 19th season of The Voice. In his blind audition, he sang "Before You Go" by Lewis Capaldi. Two of the four coaches, Gwen Stefani & John Legend, expressed interest in mentoring him. Rubin chose to become a member of Team Gwen. He made it to the finale and won the season on Dec. 15, 2020. In the finale, he debuted his original song "Up from Here", which is a tribute to his friend, Andrew McMorris (2006–2018), an aspiring aviator who tragically died two years prior after being hit by a drunk driver while hiking with his Boy Scout Troop. Ultimately, Rubin won $US100,000 and a record deal with Republic Records, a label owned by Universal Music Group.

==== The Voice performances ====
List of The Voice performances
| Stage | Date | Song | Original artist | Order | Result |
|---|---|---|---|---|---|
| Blind Auditions | Oct. 26, 2020 | "Before You Go" | Lewis Capaldi | 3.8 | Gwen and John turned, joined Team Gwen |
| Battles (Top 40) | Nov. 16, 2020 | "Like I'm Gonna Lose You" (vs. Larriah Jackson) | Meghan Trainor featuring John Legend | 8.1 | Saved by Gwen |
| Knockouts (Top 28) | Nov. 23, 2020 | "You Say" (vs. Chloé Hogan) | Lauren Daigle | 10.7 | Saved by Gwen |
| Live Playoffs (Top 17) | Nov. 30, 2020 | "Hero" | Mariah Carey | 12.8 | Saved by Public |
| Live Semi-finals (Top 9) | Dec. 7, 2020 | "Will It Go Round in Circles" with DeSz and Jim Ranger | Billy Preston | 15.3 | Saved by Public |
| Live Semi-finals (Top 9) | Dec. 7, 2020 | "Rainbow Connection" | Jim Henson | 15.12 | Saved by Public |
| Live Finale (Final 5) | Dec. 14, 2020 | "The Climb" | Miley Cyrus | 17.1 | Winner |
| Live Finale (Final 5) | Dec. 14, 2020 | "Up from Here" (original song) | Carter Rubin | 17.9 | Winner |
| Live Finale (Final 5) | Dec. 15, 2020 | "You Make It Feel Like Christmas" with Gwen Stefani | Gwen Stefani and Blake Shelton | 19.5 | Winner |

=== 2021–present: Additional releases and i still know nothing ===
In October 2021, Rubin released "horoscope", his second original song. He performed the song during the Top 10 eliminations of season 21 of The Voice. The following month, he joined his coach Gwen Stefani on stage at her performance in Las Vegas to perform "Nobody but You". Rubin released his third single, "time machine", in 2022. Rubin released his fourth single, "mess me up", and Rubin released another single, "last time" in 2023.

Rubin released i still know nothing, his first EP, on July 12, 2024. The EP consists of six singles. In an interview, Rubin described the EP as his "perspective on life, love and everything in between." On April 4, 2025, Rubin released the non-album single "play to win".

Rubin released his single, "cost to finding out", and Rubin released another single, "crossfire", and another single, "killing spree" in 2026.

== Discography ==
=== Extended plays ===
List of extended plays, with selected details
| Title | Details |
|---|---|
| i still know nothing | Released: July 12, 2024 |

=== Singles ===
List of singles, showing year released, and the name of the extended play
| Title | Year | Extended play |
|---|---|---|
| "Up from Here" | 2020 | The Season 19 Collection |
| "horoscope" | 2021 | Non-album single(s) |
| "time machine" | 2022 | Non-album single(s) |
| "mess me up" | 2023 | Non-album single(s) |
| "last time" | 2023 | Non-album single(s) |
| "too little too late" | 2024 | i still know nothing |
| "falling too hard" | 2024 | i still know nothing |
| "simple" | 2024 | i still know nothing |
| "creek rd" | 2024 | i still know nothing |
| "common ground" | 2024 | i still know nothing |
| "goodbye" | 2024 | i still know nothing |
| "play to win" | 2025 | Non-album single(s) |
| "ready when ur not" | 2025 | Non-album single(s) |
| "cost to finding out" | 2026 | Non-album single(s) |
| "crossfire" | 2026 | Non-album single(s) |
| "killing spree" | 2026 | Non-album single(s) |

Releases from The Voice

- 2020 "Hero"
- 2020 "Rainbow Connection"
- 2020 "The Climb"
- 2020 "Up from Here"
- 2020 "You Make It Feel Like Christmas" with Gwen Stefani
- 2020 "Minefields" with Top 20

Awards and achievements
| Preceded by Todd Tilghman | The Voice (American); Winner; 2020 (Fall) | Succeeded by Cam Anthony |
| Preceded by "Long Way Home" | The Voice (American); Winner's song "Up from Here"; 2020 (Fall) | Succeeded by "Wanted Dead or Alive" |
