= Real Pro Wrestling =

US professional freestyle wrestling league

- Type: Private
- Industry: modified Freestyle wrestling promotion
- Founded: 2004
- Founder: Toby Willis; Matt Case
- Headquarters: Ashland City, Tennessee, U.S.
- Area served: United States
- Key people: Toby Willis (President & CEO); Matt Case (Executive Vice President); Richard Grove (Senior Vice President Distribution); Richard Lewis (Senior Vice President Marketing & Public Relations); Bruce Boro (Vice President International)
- Owner: Real Pro Wrestling, Inc.
- Website: Real Pro Wrestling (archived)

Real Pro Wrestling
- Genre: Sports
- Country of origin: United States
- Original language: English
- No. of seasons: 1
- No. of episodes: 15

Production
- Running time: 45 minutes
- Production companies: Real Pro Wrestling, Inc.

Original release
- Network: Pax TV; Fox Sports Net
- Release: February 13, 2005

Real Pro Wrestling (also known as RPW or RealPro Wrestling) was a professional sports league of wrestling, similar to the amateur wrestling found in the Olympic Games and at the college and high school level. The term "real" was meant to emphasize that it was professional and it was wrestling, but that it was not professional wrestling in the traditional sense; modern professional wrestling features predetermined outcomes and operates under a very different set of rules from amateur wrestling.

Real Pro Wrestling, Inc was founded in 2002 by former Northwestern University wrestling teammates Matt Case and Toby Willis, of The Willis Family. The company was based in Nashville, Tennessee with branch offices in New York and Virginia. RPW was a television production company and a producer of live events.

The league began operations filmed its first season the first weekend of October 2004 and consisted of eight teams (see below). Although the teams had various city and state names, all matches were taped at Los Angeles Center Studios in Los Angeles. The first season consisted of a 16-week format starting February 13, 2005.

According to the official website, "In RPW, classic meets the future as the matches are conducted in a specially designed coliseum which showcases a raised circular mat to facilitate better camera angles and to afford the live audience a better viewing experience. The circular mat allows for 360 degree camera angles and aids in covering the close quarters that wrestlers frequently find themselves in as they maneuver for position."

Numerous similar projects were announced before RPW, but none had gotten off the ground. Lanny Bryant, the Montana-based editor of Wrestling USA magazine, proposed a similar league in the early 1990s, as one example.

RPW folded in 2007, after two seasons (2004 and 2006–7).

In the spring of 2013, the Association of Career Wrestlers formed a new series offering competitions with financial incentives for post-collegiate wrestlers called Tour ACW. This new series has a new set of rules building on the RPW rules with an emphasis on scoring.

== Wrestling style ==
The style of wrestling that was used in WRESTLING was a combination of freestyle, American Folkstyle, sumo wrestling and Greco-Roman wrestling. Because of this, wrestlers of many styles competed in the league. Greco-Roman and Freestyle were the most common wrestling backgrounds in the leagues, due largely to the Olympic experience of the wrestlers in the league. In fact, the team rosters consisted of numerous Olympians and NCAA champions.

== Rules ==
The rules were similar to freestyle wrestling but were modified to encourage risk and intensity. The goal is to dominate the opponent and pin his shoulders to the mat. This is called a fall. Points are also awarded during the six-minute match for controlling the opponent, placing him in danger, or escaping the opponent's control. If there is no fall, then the wrestler with the most points wins the match. Some of the most noticeable changes were as follows:

1. Two 3-minute periods instead of 3 periods totaling 7 minutes
2. If a wrestler pushed his opponent out of the ring he would get a point.
3. The Bonus - if a wrestler manages to stay in the center of the mat and stay aggressive, their bonus meter would go up. If they got the bonus, they would get to go into a special position in which they couldn't lose any points and could gain points by throwing their opponents.
4. TV Challenge - the coach of each wrestler is allowed once per individual match to challenge a call made by the Ref using video from multiple video angles.

== Uniforms ==
Athletes wrestled shirtless in spandex trunks. Wrestler Teague Moore praised the uniform, saying the men preferred trunks to singlets. They already stripped to the waist in training, he added, "so it wasn't much of a change."

Some fans found the uniform too revealing and said the wrestlers looked like WWE performers instead of amateurs. Defenders pointed out that college amateurs wrestled shirtless until the popularization of the singlet.

== Teams ==
- California Claw
- Chicago Groove
- Iowa Stalkers
- Minnesota Freeze
- New York Outrage
- Oklahoma Slam
- Pennsylvania Hammer
- Texas Shooters

== League structure ==
Despite the existence of eight "franchises" in RPW, all tournaments were conducted in a classic elimination bracket format. No actual dual meets were held.

== Television coverage ==
In the league's first season, 2005–06, matches were televised on PAX TV (now ION Television) on Sunday evenings and on Fox Sports Net affiliates at various times. Rulon Gardner, one of the most famous figures in amateur wrestling in the United States, was the color analyst. Veteran Radio and Television Sports Announcer Chip Hoback from Nashville, TN did the Voice Over and Highlights.

Due to executive reorganizations at both networks, both PAX and FSN pulled the show. RPW then decided to syndicate coverage of the second season on various broadcast stations.

In an interview with The Wrestling Mall co-founder Toby Willis also revealed that although sponsors and investors were already lined up for Season 2 a few employees had attempted a "take over" of the company which also added to the downfall of the league. In the same series of articles Mr. Willis stated his wish that wrestling would adopt more of a martial arts mentality to draw in more kids. Mr. Willis said, "Wrestling desperately needs to rebrand itself as a martial art not just another arbitrary sport. We need to use military terminology and martial art vocabulary. We need to teach it as self defense. So instead of the high school coach walking up to a kid in the hallways of school and asking them to try wrestling, they should ask the kid if he wants to learn self defense. What kid says they want to be defenseless? Then when the kid shows up for practice, the coach has to teach wrestling from a martial arts perspective."

== Notable participants ==
- Jesse Jantzen - NCAA Division I wrestling champion and MOW Winner for Harvard University, 3x NCAA Division I All-American, Freestyle wrestling University World Games champion. Hollywood producer, Philanthropist and Financier.
- Muhammed Lawal - Season 1 Champion, NCAA Division II champion and Freestyle World Championships competitor (7th place), current mixed martial artist with Bellator, and former Strikeforce Light Heavyweight Champion.
- Andy Hrovat - wrestled at 2008 Olympics and defeated Muhammed Lawal at the 2008 U.S. Olympic Trials.
- Daniel Cormier - Season 1 Champion, two-time Olympic Freestyle Wrestler and 2008 U.S. team captain, King of the Cage Champion, Strikeforce Heavyweight Grand Prix Champion and the former UFC light heavyweight, and heavyweight champion.
- Teague Moore - U.S. Open Champion, College Wrestling Coach, & Founder of the Association of Career Wrestlers.
- Aaron Simpson - 11 UFC veteran, competing in both the Middle Weight and Welterweight division. Also a former competitor on American Gladiators.
- Joe Warren - 2006 Greco-Roman World Championships gold medalist, current mixed martial artist with Bellator Fighting Championships, and Bellator Season 2 Featherweight Tournament winner and former Bellator Featherweight Champion.
- Patrick Cummins (born November 16, 1980) is an American mixed martial artist.[5] He currently competes in the Light Heavyweight division of the Ultimate Fighting Championship. As of August 3, 2015, Cummins is #12 in official UFC Light Heavyweight rankings. [6]

== Champions ==
- Season 1:

Weight Division	Champion	Team
121 lb (55 kg)	(United States) Sammie Henson	Pennsylvania Hammer
132 lb (60 kg)	(United States) Tony Deanda	New York Outrage
145 lb (66 kg)	(United States) Doug Schwab	Iowa Stalkers
163 lb (74 kg)	(United States) Joe Williams	Chicago Groove
184 lb (83 kg)	(United States) Muhammed Lawal	Oklahoma Slam
211 lb (96 kg)	(United States) Daniel Cormier	Oklahoma Slam
264 lb (120 kg)	(United States) Patrick Cummins	Pennsylvania Hammer
