= Galileo Galilei (opera) =

2002 opera by Philip Glass

- Opera by Philip Glass
- Glass in 2006
- Librettist: Mary Zimmerman; Arnold Weinstein
- Based on: life of Galileo Galilei
- Premiere: 24 June 2002; Goodman Theatre, Chicago

Galileo Galilei is an opera based on excerpts from the life of Galileo Galilei, which premiered in 2002 at Chicago's Goodman Theatre, as well as subsequent presentations at the Brooklyn Academy of Music's New Wave Music Festival and London's Barbican Theatre. The music is by Philip Glass, with libretto and original direction by Mary Zimmerman and Arnold Weinstein. The piece is presented in one act, consisting of ten scenes without break.

Galileo Galilei is Glass' s 18th opera. The libretto draws from letters of Galileo and his family, and various other documents, to retrospectively journey through Galileo's life. Opening with him as an old, blind man after the trial and Inquisition for his heresy, it explores his religiosity as well as his break with the church. It expands into the greater, oscillating relationship of science to both religion and art. It reaches its end with Galileo — as a young boy — watching an opera composed by his father, Vincenzo Galilei, who was a member of the Florentine Camerata, an association of artists who are credited with creating the art form that came to be known as opera. His father's opera was about the motions of the celestial bodies.

The opera has been revived with new productions in 2012 by Madison Opera and Portland Opera. The Portland Opera production was recorded by Orange Mountain Music. Opera Theatre of Saint Louis staged it in June 2024.

== Production notes ==
All genius meets with extreme resistance before it is accepted as truth. In the case of Galileo, it was the mere hypothesis that the Earth revolved around the Sun. The notion was considered heretical and blasphemous by scholars and clergy alike. Much was done to destroy Galileo's reputation. And since they could not do so through scientific proof, they did so through slander and threats of torture. It was not until recently that the Catholic Church finally admitted that they were wrong in persecuting Galileo. It took hundreds of years for them to admit the mistake. Galileo died believing that all of the advancements he had made in science were for naught. His books were banned, and his name was disgraced. All of this, for suggesting a theory that turned out to be true.

In addition to depicting Galileo's trials before the Inquisition, the opera also allows us a glance into Galileo's more personal side. Namely, in showing us his relationship to his daughter Maria Celeste, who was a nun. Maria Celeste shared her father's love of learning and science, but also understood that he was a man of great faith. She recognized that science was the very subject that served to deepen his faith, and she encouraged him on this path. The two met rarely. They were separated not only by distance, but by Galileo's often ailing health. Sadly, they were ultimately separated by her death at the age of 33, a source of incredible sadness for Galileo. However, their connection in this opera serves to give his story a more personal rendering. The story itself is told backwards through time. It begins with an aged Galileo, blinded from having looked at the Sun too often and ends with him as a child. This is related to the function of a telescope, which works by reversing images with lenses. Much of the staging in this production is representative of Galileo's theories and follows the patterns of the discoveries, planets, and constellations that his inventions made known to the world.

== Synopsis ==
Scene 1

Opening Song

In the final days of his life, the now blind Galileo Galilei remembers the things in his life that he can no longer see.

Scene 2

Recantation

The officials of the Catholic Church rebuke the scientist for not relenting on his theory that the Earth revolves around the Sun. The Pope hands down his sentence, and then reminds Galileo of a time when they walked in the garden as friends.

Scene 3

Pears

Maria Celeste, the daughter of Galileo, sends her intense devotion love and support through letters that are accompanied by elements of her garden at the convent.

Scene 4

Trial

Galileo is summoned before two Cardinals of the Catholic Church to answer questions regarding his book "Dialogue Concerning the Two Chief Systems of the World".

Scene 5

Dialogue Concerning the Two Chief Systems of the World

As Galileo pens his book, the fictitious characters come alive to discuss the theories presented. Here, the Older Galileo becomes the Younger Galileo.

Scene 6

Incline Plane

The theories and experiments are put to the test in Galileo's laboratory.

Scene 7

A Walk in the Garden

Galileo and his great friend Cardinal Barberini discuss Galileo's newest book in the Garden. After the Cardinal's feeble attempt at poetry, Galileo expresses his fear of his enemies. Barberini warns Galileo not to continue with his theories regarding the planets.

Scene 8

Lamps

While at mass with his daughter, Galileo observes the swinging of a lamp suspended from the ceiling moving in pendulum fashion and explains his theory to Maria Celeste.

Scene 9

Presentation of the Telescope

Galileo presents his invention to the Duchess and her Ladies in Waiting. The Duchess and Galileo reminisce about a time in their youth when they watched an opera together composed by Galileo's father, Vincenzo.

Scene 10

Opera within the Opera

The Duchess and Galileo, now children, are in the audience as his father's opera is performed. The magical story of the planetary figures becomes the vehicle through which Galileo is reunited with his deceased daughter.
