= The Voice (American TV series) season 19 =

The Voice
- Season 19
- Promotional poster featuring coaches Stefani, Shelton, Legend, and Clarkson
- Hosted by: Carson Daly
- Coaches: Kelly Clarkson; Gwen Stefani; John Legend; Blake Shelton
- No. of contestants: 40 artists
- Winner: Carter Rubin
- Winning coach: Gwen Stefani
- Runner-up: Jim Ranger
- No. of episodes: 19

Release
- Original network: NBC
- Original release: October 19 – December 15, 2020

Season chronology
- ← Previous; Season 18 Next → Season 20

The nineteenth season of the American reality television series The Voice premiered on October 19, 2020, on NBC. Blake Shelton, Kelly Clarkson and John Legend returned as coaches for their nineteenth, sixth, and fourth seasons, respectively. Gwen Stefani rejoined the panel for her fifth season, after being replaced by Nick Jonas the previous season. Meanwhile, Carson Daly returned for his nineteenth season as host.

Starting from this season, the studio version of all performances are released on YouTube Music instead of iTunes as before. Due to the ongoing COVID-19 pandemic in the United States, the bonus multiplier for downloads is not present for the second consecutive season as performances being recorded away from the studios; additionally, the entire season is filmed without a physical studio audience.

Carter Rubin was named the winner of the season, marking Gwen Stefani's first win as a coach and Rubin as the youngest male winner (and second-youngest winner overall at the time of his victory, only behind season 14's winner Brynn Cartelli). After five attempts, Stefani also became the fourth female coach to win the competition, following Christina Aguilera, Alicia Keys, and Kelly Clarkson.

== Coaches and hosts ==
Coaches and Host of The Voice Season 19

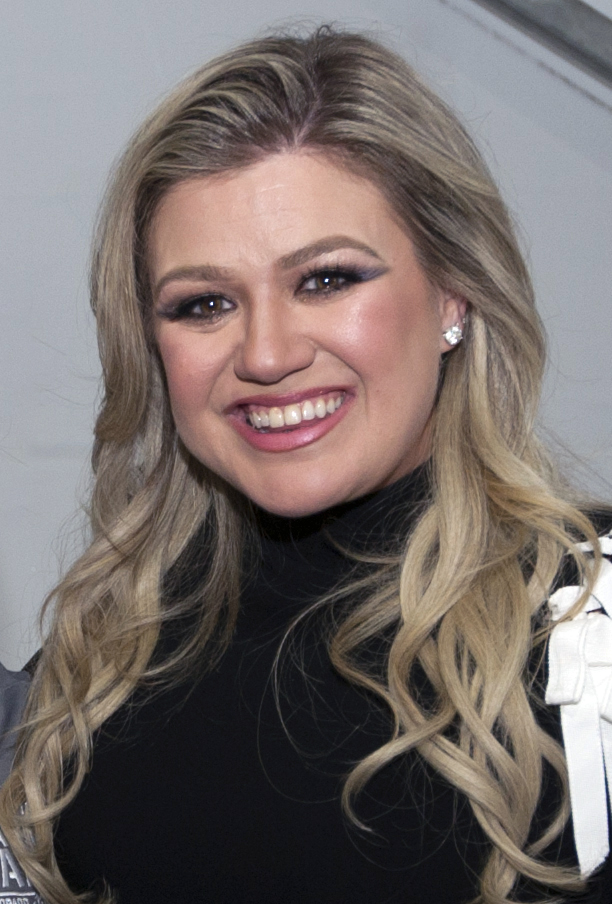
Kelly Clarkson

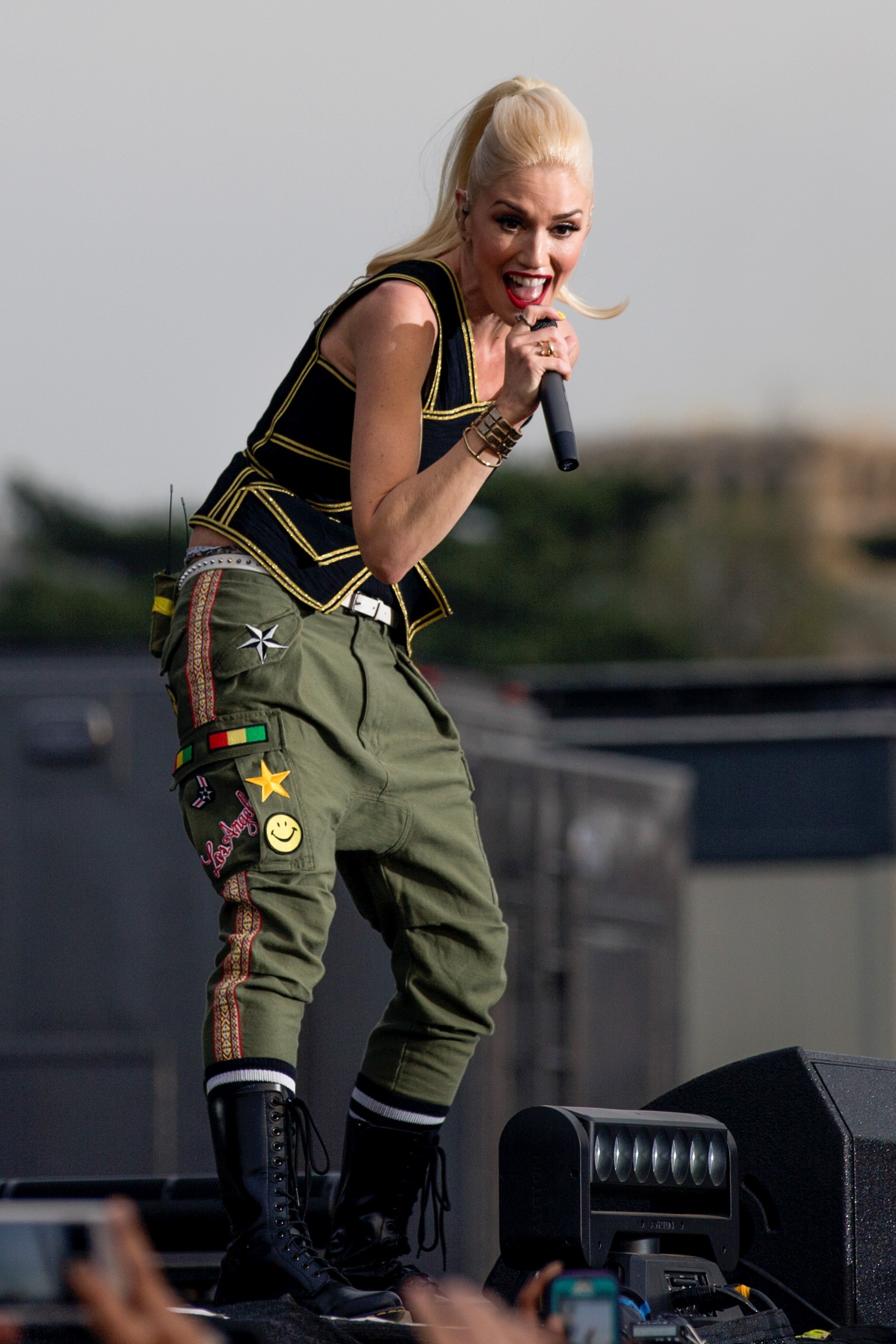
Gwen Stefani

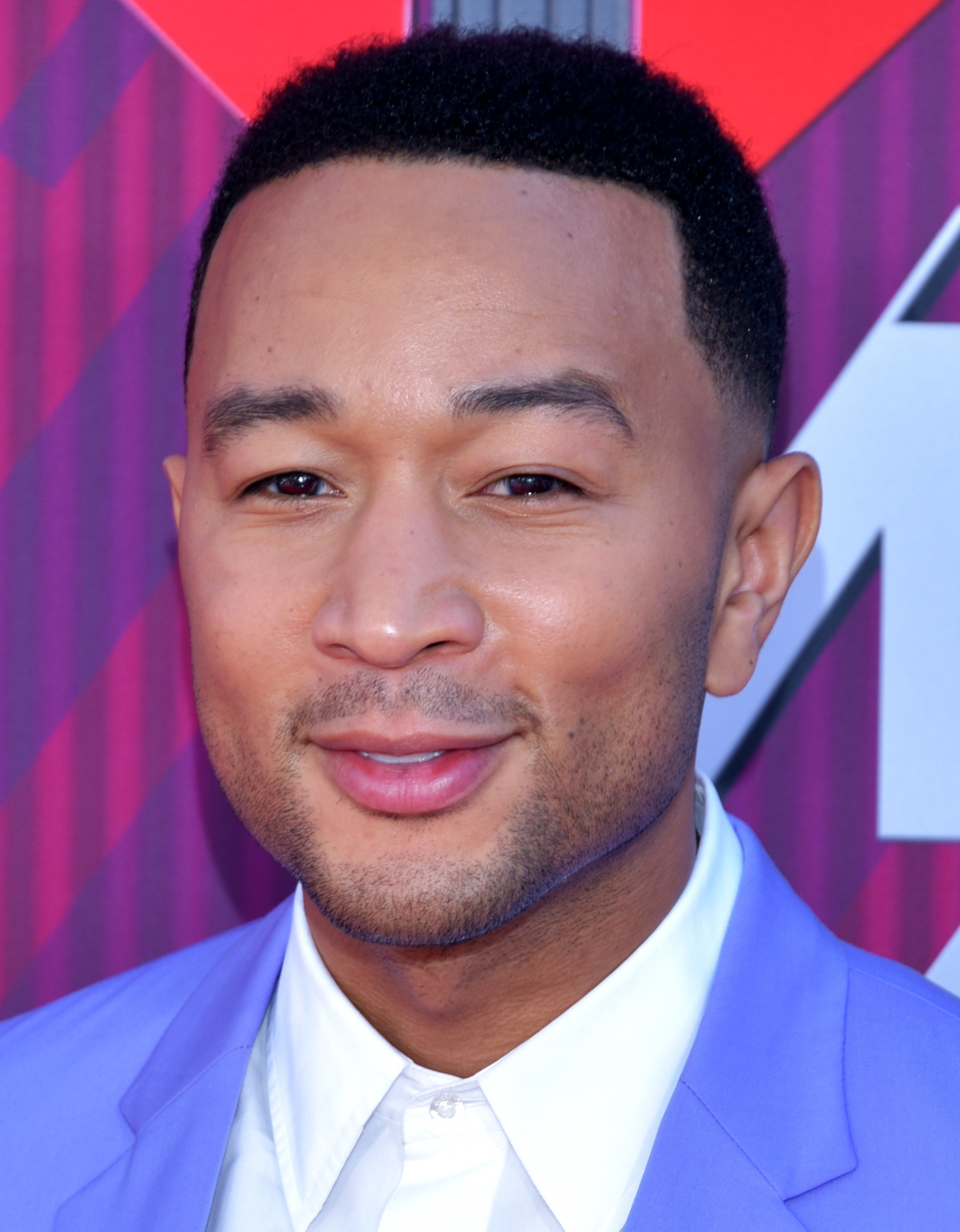
John Legend

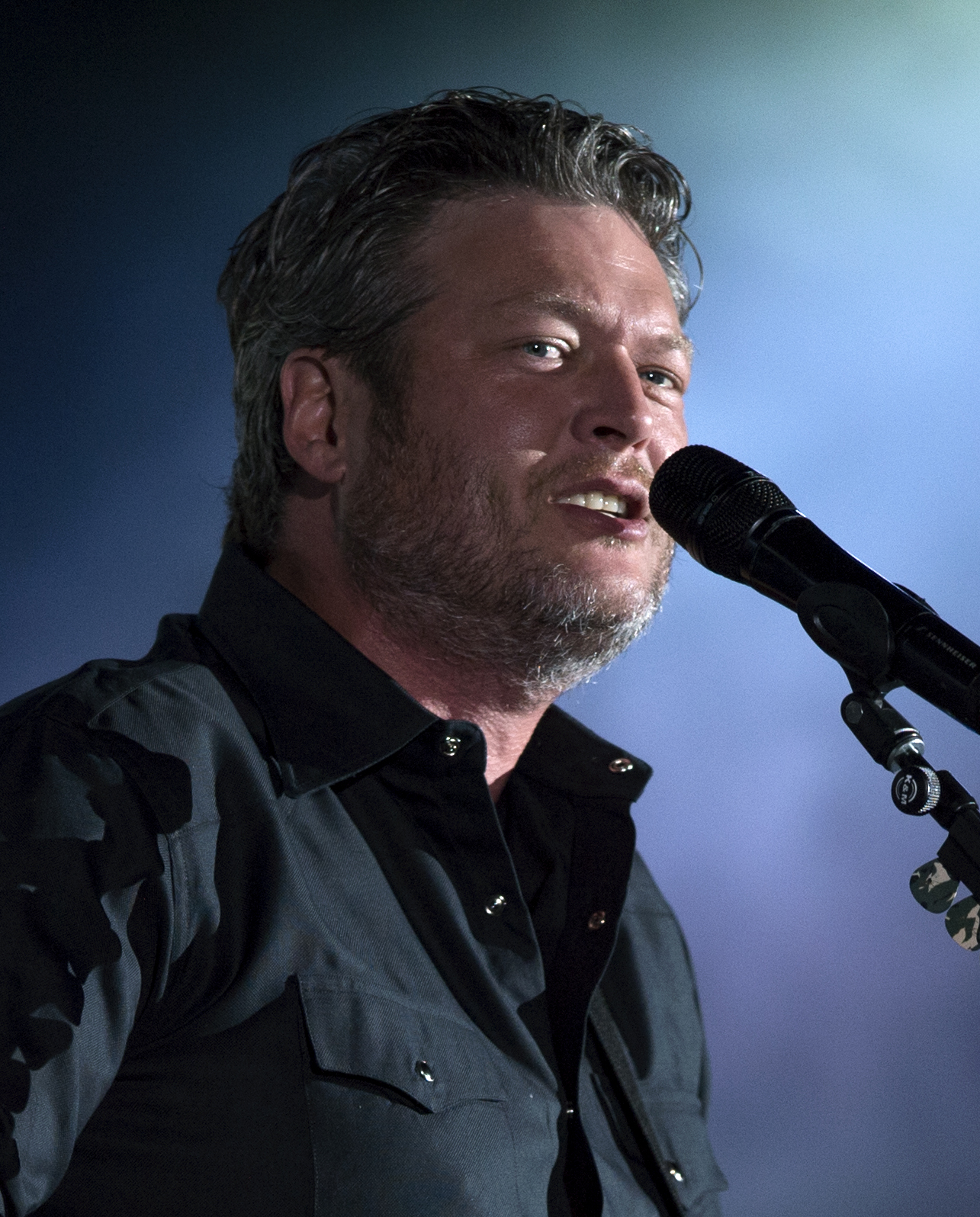
Blake Shelton

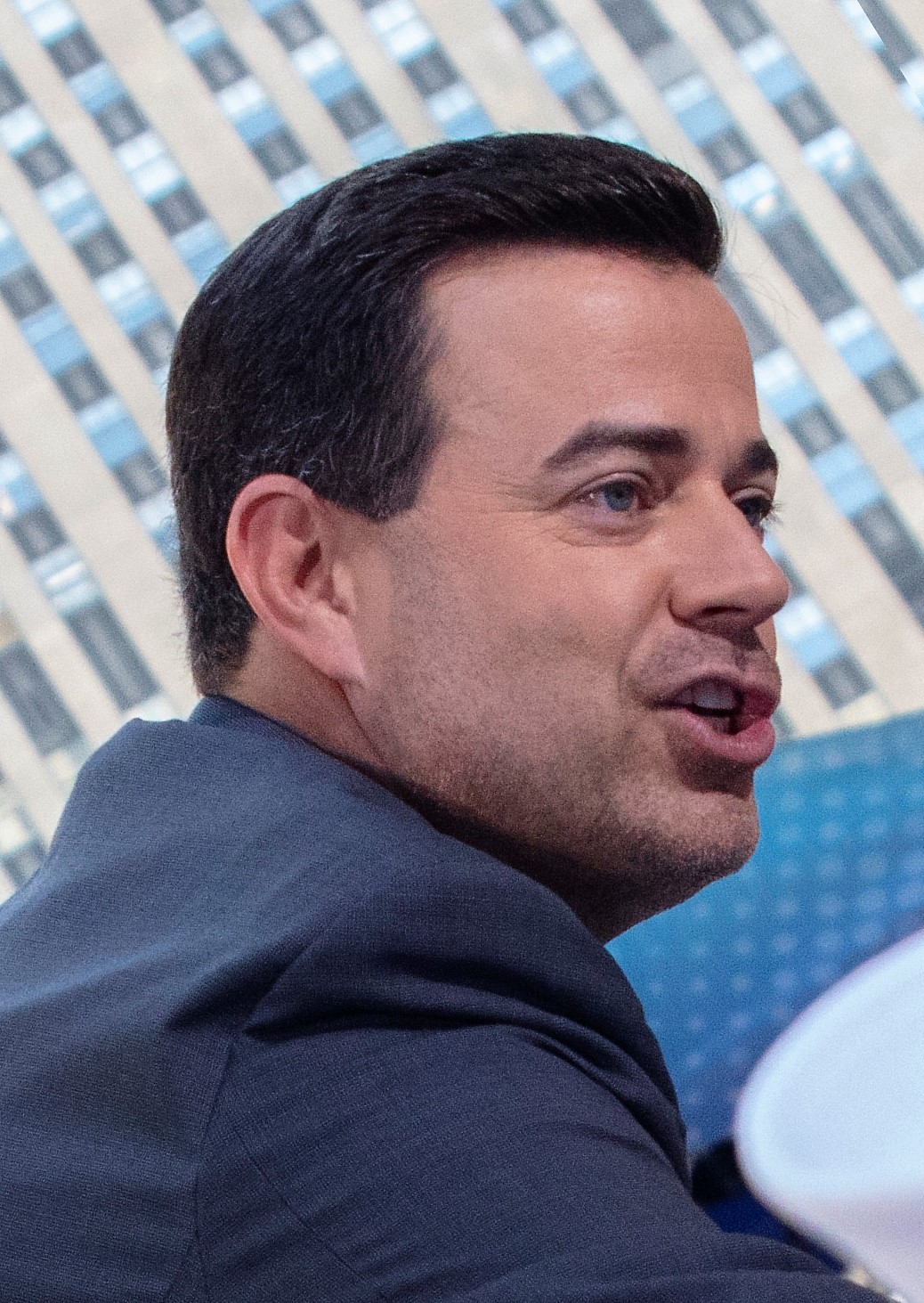
Carson Daly

On June 16, 2020, NBC announced that there would be a change in the coaches for this season. Blake Shelton would return for his nineteenth season, Kelly Clarkson for her sixth, and John Legend for his fourth. However, Nick Jonas opted not to return, allowing the return of Gwen Stefani after a one-season hiatus, marking her fifth season as a coach on the show. Carson Daly returned as host.

This season's advisors for the Battles were: Kane Brown for Team Blake, Leon Bridges for Team Kelly, Miguel for Team Legend, and Julia Michaels for Team Gwen. Usher served as a mega-mentor for all teams during the Knockouts.

== Teams ==
Color key

- Winner
- Runner-up
- Third place
- Fourth place
- Fifth place
- Eliminated in Live Semi-Final
- Eliminated in the Live Playoffs
- Stolen in the Knockouts
- Eliminated in the Knockouts
- Stolen in the Battles
- Eliminated in the Battles
- Disqualified (Note: Gallagher performed in the Four-Way Knockout, but was disqualified from the program prior to the winner of the Knockout being announced on the first week of the live shows for allegedly violating the program's COVID-19-related protocols. Therefore, the public vote results were based on the remaining three artists who competed.)

Coaches	Top 40 artists					
Kelly Clarkson						
Kelly Clarkson	DeSz	Cami Clune	Tanner Gomes	Madeline Consoer	~~Sid Kingsley~~	Ryan Gallagher
Kelly Clarkson	Marisa Corvo	Kelsie Watts	~~Joseph Soul~~	Emmalee	Skylar Alyvia Mayton	Eli Zamora
Gwen Stefani						
Gwen Stefani	Carter Rubin	Ben Allen	Payge Turner	Joseph Soul	~~Chloé Hogan~~	Larriah Jackson
Gwen Stefani	Van Andrew	Ryan Berg	~~Lauren Frihauf~~	Tori Miller	Lain Roy	Liam St. John
John Legend						
John Legend	John Holiday	Tamara Jade	Bailey Rae	Chloé Hogan	~~Cami Clune~~	Julia Cooper
John Legend	Casmè	Lauren Frihauf	~~James Pyle~~	~~Sid Kingsley~~	Rio Souma	Olivia Reyes
Blake Shelton						
Blake Shelton	Jim Ranger	Ian Flanigan	Worth the Wait	Sid Kingsley	Taryn Papa	~~Ben Allen~~
Blake Shelton	James Pyle	Jus Jon	Payton Lamar	Aaron Scott	Sam Stacy	John Sullivan
Note: Italicized names are stolen artists (names struck through within former teams). Underlined names are artists who were saved by their coach in the Battles and advanced to the Four-way Knockout.

== Blind auditions ==
Blind auditions color key
✔	Coach pressed "I WANT YOU" button
	Artist defaulted to a coach's team
	Artist selected to join this coach's team
	Artist was eliminated with no coach pressing their button
✘	Coach pressed "I WANT YOU" button, but was blocked by another coach from getting the artist
	Blocked by Kelly; Blocked by Gwen; Blocked by John; Blocked by Blake

=== Episode 1 (Oct. 19) ===
Among this episode's auditionees was Jim Ranger, who previously competed on the ninth and tenth seasons of American Idol, and Eli Zamora, who previously competed on the eighth season of La Voz.

First blind auditions results
Order	Artist	Age	Hometown	Song	Coach's and artist's choices			
Order	Artist	Age	Hometown	Song	Kelly	Gwen	John	Blake
1	Tamara Jade	30	Bowie, Maryland	"Cuz I Love You"	✔	✔	✔	✔
2	Lauren Frihauf	16	Byers, Colorado	"Come to My Window"	–	✔	✔	–
3	Joseph Soul	34	Maui, Hawaii	"Is This Love"	✔	–	–	✔
4	Ian Flanigan	30	Saugerties, New York	"Colder Weather"	–	–	–	✔
5	Hailey Green	14	St. Martin, Mississippi	"Soulshine"	–	–	–	–
6	Jim Ranger	38	Bakersfield, California	"Blue Ain’t Your Color"	–	✔	✔	✔
7	Eli Zamora	25	El Paso, Texas	"Ya lo Sé, Que Tu Te Vas"	✔	–	–	–
8	Payge Turner	27	Port of Spain, Trinidad and Tobago	"Call Out My Name"	–	✔	–	✔
9	Corey Ward	34	Hartsville, South Carolina	"Way Down We Go"	–	–	–	–
10	Marisa Corvo	33	Staten Island, New York	"Perfect"	✔	✔	–	✔
11	John Holiday	35	Rosenberg, Texas	"Misty"	✘	✔	✔	–

=== Episode 2 (Oct. 20) ===
Second blind auditions results
Order	Artist	Age	Hometown	Song	Coach's and artist's choices			
Order	Artist	Age	Hometown	Song	Kelly	Gwen	John	Blake
1	Taryn Papa	30	Middlebury, Connecticut	"Anyway"	✘	✔	–	✔
2	Liam St. John	29	Spokane, Washington	"Sex and Candy"	–	✔	–	✔
3	Faye Moffett	35	Tulsa, Oklahoma	"Anyone"	–	–	–	–
4	Aaron Scott	36	Tomah, Wisconsin	"Hemorrhage (In My Hands)"	–	–	✔	✔
5	Madeline Consoer	24	Eagle River, Wisconsin	"Girl"	✔	–	–	~~✘~~^{1}
6	Cami Clune	20	Buffalo, New York	"Skinny Love"	✔	✔	✔	✘
7	Parede Valente-Johnson	28	Eugene, Oregon	"Crossroads"	–	–	–	–
8	Ryan Gallagher	31	Ada Township, Michigan	"The Prayer"	✔	–	–	✔
9	Chloé Hogan	20	Orlando, Florida	"What the World Needs Now Is Love"	–	✔	–	–
10	Kiari Mhoon	26	Fayetteville, North Carolina	"Wanted"	–	–	–	–
11	Sid Kingsley	37	Richmond, Virginia	"Don't Think Twice, It's All Right"	–	✔	✔	✔

- ^1 Kelly blocked Blake, but the block did not count because Blake did not press his button.

=== Episode 3 (Oct. 26) ===
Among this episode's auditionees was Kelsie Watts, who previously competed on the fifteenth season of American Idol.

Third blind auditions results
Order	Artist	Age	Hometown	Song	Coach's and artist's choices			
Order	Artist	Age	Hometown	Song	Kelly	Gwen	John	Blake
1	Rio Souma	28	Detroit, Michigan	"Cruisin'"	✔	✔	✔	–
2	Ryan Berg	27	Dallas, Texas	"Waiting on the World to Change"	–	✔	✘	–
3	Becca Kötte	33	Fargo, North Dakota	"American Woman"	–	–	–	–
4	Jus Jon	30	Newport News, Virginia	"Talk"	–	–	–	✔
5	Ben Allen	42	Estero, Florida	"Red Dirt Road"	–	✔	✔	✔
6	Kelsie Watts	29	Lubbock, Texas	"I Dare You"	✔	✔	–	–
7	James Mays	24	Memphis, Tennessee	"The Show Must Go On"	–	–	–	–
8	Carter Rubin	14	Shoreham, New York	"Before You Go"	–	✔	✔	–
9	Casmè (Casmè Ann Barnes-Carter)	39	New Orleans, Louisiana	"Baby I Love You"	–	–	✔	–
10	Michelle Moonshine	28	Salt Lake City, Utah	"Carolina in My Mind"	–	–	–	–
11	DeSz (Desiree Washington)	30	Houston, Texas	"Un-Break My Heart"	✔	✔	✔	✔

=== Episode 4 (Oct. 27) ===
Fourth blind auditions results
Order	Artist	Age	Hometown	Song	Coach's and artist's choices			
Order	Artist	Age	Hometown	Song	Kelly	Gwen	John	Blake
1	Olivia Reyes	19	Teaneck, New Jersey	"Falling"	–	✔	✔	–
2	Tony Mason	56	Tulsa, Oklahoma	"What's Going On"	–	–	–	–
3	Sam Stacy	27	Lincoln, Nebraska	"Fire and Rain"	✔	✔	–	✔
4	Larriah Jackson	15	Sacramento, California	"I'll Be There"	–	✔	–	–
5	Payton Lamar	23	Jacksonville, Florida	"Never Alone"	–	–	–	✔
6	Van Andrew	29	Cooper, Texas	"Behind Blue Eyes"	–	✔	–	✔
7	Tanner Gomes	28	Yuma, Arizona	"Cowboys and Angels"	✔	✔	✔	–

=== Episode 5 (Nov. 2) ===
Fifth blind auditions results
Order	Artist	Age	Hometown	Song	Coach's and artist's choices			
Order	Artist	Age	Hometown	Song	Kelly	Gwen	John	Blake
1	Julia Cooper	21	Poland, Ohio	"Alaska"	✔	✔	✔	–
2	Apropos	31	Detroit, Michigan	"I Heard It Through The Grapevine"	–	–	–	–
3	John Sullivan	32	Concord, North Carolina	"Operator (That's Not The Way It Feels)"	–	✔	–	✔
4	Skylar Alyvia Mayton	15	Ada, Michigan	"Blinding Lights"	✔	–	–	–
5	Lain Roy	22	Larkspur, Colorado	"Someone You Loved"	–	✔	✔	–
6	Jared Ming	32	Oahu, Hawaii	"Drunk Me"	–	–	–	–
7	Worth the Wait (Tara, Mia, and Jacy Matthews)	13–47	Gadsden, Alabama	"When Will I Be Loved"	✔	✔	✔	✔
8	Emmalee	20	Kings Mountain, North Carolina	"How Will I Know"	✔	–	✔	Team full
9	Bailey Rae	18	Roberta, Oklahoma	"Does My Ring Burn Your Finger"	Team full	–	✔	Team full
10	Neci	32	Nashville, Tennessee	"God Bless The Child"	Team full	–	–	Team full
11	Tori Miller	26	Siloam Springs, Arkansas	"When You Say Nothing at All"	Team full	✔	–	Team full
12	James Pyle	30	West Hills, California	"Watermelon Sugar"	Team full	Team full	✔	Team full

== Battles ==
The Battles began on November 9, 2020. The advisors for this round were Leon Bridges for Team Kelly, Julia Michaels for Team Gwen, Miguel for Team Legend, and Kane Brown for Team Blake. The coaches can steal one losing artist from other coaches and save one losing artist on their team. However, the team coach may only hit their button to save an artist after it is clear that no other coach is going to steal the artist. Artists who win their battle or are stolen by another coach advance to the Knockout Rounds.

Battles color key
Artist won the Battle and advanced to the Knockouts
Artist lost the Battle, but was stolen by another coach, and, advanced to the Knockouts
Artist lost the Battle, but was saved by their coach, and, advanced to the four-way Knockout
Artist lost the Battle and was eliminated

Battles results
Episodes	Coach	Order	Winner	Song	Loser	'Steal'/'Save' result			
Episodes	Coach	Order	Winner	Song	Loser	Kelly	Gwen	John	Blake
Episode 6 (Monday, Nov. 9, 2020)	Blake	1	Worth the Wait	"Little White Church"	Taryn Papa	–	–	–	✔
Episode 6 (Monday, Nov. 9, 2020)	John	2	Tamara Jade	"Hard Place"	Olivia Reyes	–	–	–	–
Episode 6 (Monday, Nov. 9, 2020)	Kelly	3	Madeline Consoer	"Nobody Wants To Be Lonely"	Eli Zamora	–	–	–	–
Episode 6 (Monday, Nov. 9, 2020)	Gwen	4	Payge Turner	"If the World Was Ending"	Lauren Frihauf	–	N/A	✔	✔
Episode 6 (Monday, Nov. 9, 2020)	Blake	5	Jus Jon	"Dancing with a Stranger"	Payton Lamar	–	–	Steal used	Save used
Episode 6 (Monday, Nov. 9, 2020)	John	6	Bailey Rae	"Tennessee Whiskey"	Sid Kingsley	✔	–	N/A	–
Episode 7 (Tuesday, Nov. 10, 2020)	Kelly	1	DeSz	"If You Don't Know Me by Now"	Joseph Soul	N/A	✔	Steal used	–
Episode 7 (Tuesday, Nov. 10, 2020)	Blake	2	Jim Ranger	"Good as You"	John Sullivan	Steal used	Steal used	Steal used	Save used
Episode 7 (Tuesday, Nov. 10, 2020)	Kelly	3	Tanner Gomes	"Whiskey Lullaby"	Skylar Alyvia Mayton	–	Steal used	Steal used	–
Episode 7 (Tuesday, Nov. 10, 2020)	Gwen	4	Chloé Hogan	"Adore You"	Lain Roy	Steal used	–	Steal used	–
Episode 7 (Tuesday, Nov. 10, 2020)	John	5	John Holiday	"Summer Soft"	Julia Cooper	Steal used	Steal used	✔	–
Episode 8 (Monday, Nov. 16, 2020)	Gwen	1	Carter Rubin	"Like I'm Gonna Lose You"	Larriah Jackson	Steal used	✔	Team full	–
Episode 8 (Monday, Nov. 16, 2020)	Blake	2	Ian Flanigan	"Have You Ever Seen the Rain?"	Aaron Scott	Steal used	Team full	Team full	Save used
Episode 8 (Monday, Nov. 16, 2020)	John	3	Casmè	"You're All I Need to Get By"	Rio Souma	Steal used	Team full	Team full	–
Episode 8 (Monday, Nov. 16, 2020)	Kelly	4	Marisa Corvo	"I Surrender"	Ryan Gallagher	✔	Team full	Team full	–
Episode 8 (Monday, Nov. 16, 2020)	Kelly	5	Kelsie Watts	"I Love Me"	Emmalee	Team full	Team full	Team full	–
Episode 8 (Monday, Nov. 16, 2020)	Blake	6	Ben Allen	"Free"	Sam Stacy	Team full	Team full	Team full	Save used
Episode 8 (Monday, Nov. 16, 2020)	Gwen	7	Van Andrew	"Exile"	Tori Miller	Team full	Team full	Team full	–
Episode 8 (Monday, Nov. 16, 2020)	Gwen	8	Ryan Berg	"I Need a Dollar"	Liam St. John	Team full	Team full	Team full	–
Episode 8 (Monday, Nov. 16, 2020)	John	9	Cami Clune	"Wicked Game"	James Pyle	Team full	Team full	Team full	✔

== Knockouts ==
In the Knockouts round, each coach can steal one losing artist from another team. Artists who win their knockout or are stolen by another coach advance to the Live Playoffs. Former coach Usher will serve as the mega mentor for all teams in this round. This season, each saved artist from the Battle Rounds will go head-to-head in the four-way Knockout. Results for the head-to-head are decided by a public vote, with the winner announced during the first week of Live Shows.

Knockouts color key
Artist won the Knockout and advanced to the Live Playoffs
Artist lost the Knockout but, was stolen by another coach, and advanced to the Live Playoffs
Artist lost the Knockout and was eliminated
Artist was disqualified from the competition

Knockouts results
Episodes	Team	Order	Song	Artists		Song	'Steal' result			
Episodes	Team	Order	Song	Winner	Loser	Song	Kelly	Gwen	John	Blake
Episode 9 (Tuesday, Nov. 17, 2020)	John	1	"Higher Ground"	Tamara Jade	Casmè	"Wrecking Ball"	–	–	N/A	–
Episode 9 (Tuesday, Nov. 17, 2020)	Gwen	2	"Creep"	Payge Turner	Ryan Berg	"Makin' Me Look Good Again"	–	N/A	–	–
Episode 9 (Tuesday, Nov. 17, 2020)	Blake	3	"Delta Dawn"	Worth the Wait	Ben Allen	"She Got the Best of Me"	–	✔	–	N/A
Episode 10 (Monday, Nov. 23, 2020)	Kelly	1	"Can We Talk"	DeSz	Sid Kingsley	"Make It Rain"	N/A	Team full	✔	✔
Episode 10 (Monday, Nov. 23, 2020)	Blake	2	"Humble and Kind"	Jim Ranger	Jus Jon	"Finesse"	–	Team full	–	Team full
Episode 10 (Monday, Nov. 23, 2020)	John	3	"Let Me Down Easy"	Bailey Rae	Lauren Frihauf	"Cry Baby"	–	Team full	N/A	Team full
Episode 10 (Monday, Nov. 23, 2020)	Blake	4	"Beautiful Crazy"	Ian Flanigan	James Pyle	"In My Blood"	–	Team full	–	Team full
Episode 10 (Monday, Nov. 23, 2020)	Gwen	5	"Lovely"	Joseph Soul	Van Andrew	"Human"	–	Team full	–	Team full
Episode 10 (Monday, Nov. 23, 2020)	Kelly	6	"Die from a Broken Heart"	Madeline Consoer	Kelsie Watts	"You Oughta Know"	N/A	Team full	–	Team full
Episode 10 (Monday, Nov. 23, 2020)	Gwen	7	"You Say"	Carter Rubin	Chloé Hogan	"Weak"	–	Team full	✔	Team full
Episode 11 (Tuesday, Nov. 24, 2020)	Kelly	1	"Real Good Man"	Tanner Gomes	Marisa Corvo	"If I Could Turn Back Time"	N/A	Team full	Team full	Team full
Episode 11 (Tuesday, Nov. 24, 2020)	John	2	"All by Myself"	John Holiday	Cami Clune	"I Put A Spell On You"	✔	Team full	Team full	Team full
Episode 11 (Tuesday, Nov. 24, 2020)	Four–way Knockout	3	"Cry"	Taryn Papa	Julia Cooper	"Wish You Were Gay"	No steals allowed			
Episode 11 (Tuesday, Nov. 24, 2020)	Four–way Knockout	3	"Cry"	Taryn Papa	Larriah Jackson	"One and Only"	No steals allowed			
Episode 11 (Tuesday, Nov. 24, 2020)	Four–way Knockout	3	"Cry"	Taryn Papa	Ryan Gallagher	"Time to Say Goodbye"	No steals allowed			

== Live shows ==
Continuing from the previous season, the number of weeks of live shows consist of the Live Playoffs, the Semi-finals, and the Finale.

Live shows color key
Artist was saved by the Public's votes
Artist was saved by their coach
Artist was not selected to be advance nor be eliminated
Artist was instantly saved
Artist was eliminated

=== Week 1: Live Playoffs (Nov. 30, Dec. 1) ===
Playoffs results
Episode	Coach	Order	Artist	Song	Result
Episode 12 (Monday, Nov. 30, 2020)	Kelly Clarkson	1	DeSz	"What's Love Got to Do with It"	Public's vote
Episode 12 (Monday, Nov. 30, 2020)	Kelly Clarkson	2	Madeline Consoer	"What If I Never Get Over You"	Eliminated
Episode 12 (Monday, Nov. 30, 2020)	Kelly Clarkson	3	Tanner Gomes	"Lovin' On You"	Wild Card
Episode 12 (Monday, Nov. 30, 2020)	Kelly Clarkson	4	Cami Clune	"Never Tear Us Apart"	Kelly's Choice
Episode 12 (Monday, Nov. 30, 2020)	Gwen Stefani	5	Payge Turner	"It's Gonna Be Me"	Wild Card
Episode 12 (Monday, Nov. 30, 2020)	Gwen Stefani	6	Ben Allen	"There Goes My Life"	Gwen's choice
Episode 12 (Monday, Nov. 30, 2020)	Gwen Stefani	7	Joseph Soul	"How Deep Is Your Love"	Eliminated
Episode 12 (Monday, Nov. 30, 2020)	Gwen Stefani	8	Carter Rubin	"Hero"	Public's vote
Episode 12 (Monday, Nov. 30, 2020)	Blake Shelton	9	Jim Ranger	"Rumor"	Blake's choice
Episode 12 (Monday, Nov. 30, 2020)	Blake Shelton	10	Worth the Wait	"Love Is Alive"	Wild Card
Episode 12 (Monday, Nov. 30, 2020)	Blake Shelton	11	Ian Flanigan	"Make You Feel My Love"	Public's vote
Episode 12 (Monday, Nov. 30, 2020)	Blake Shelton	12	Taryn Papa	"I Hope You're Happy Now"	Eliminated
Episode 12 (Monday, Nov. 30, 2020)	Blake Shelton	13	Sid Kingsley	"Beyond"	Eliminated
Episode 12 (Monday, Nov. 30, 2020)	John Legend	14	Tamara Jade	"Crazy"	John's choice
Episode 12 (Monday, Nov. 30, 2020)	John Legend	15	Chloé Hogan	"My Future"	Eliminated
Episode 12 (Monday, Nov. 30, 2020)	John Legend	16	Bailey Rae	"Sweet Music Man"	Wild Card
Episode 12 (Monday, Nov. 30, 2020)	John Legend	17	John Holiday	"Fly Me to the Moon"	Public's vote
Episode 13 (Tuesday, Dec. 1, 2020)	Blake Shelton	1	Worth the Wait	"I'm Gonna Love You Through It"	Eliminated
Episode 13 (Tuesday, Dec. 1, 2020)	Gwen Stefani	2	Payge Turner	"Diamonds"	Eliminated
Episode 13 (Tuesday, Dec. 1, 2020)	Kelly Clarkson	3	Tanner Gomes	"Pickin' Wildflowers"	Eliminated
Episode 13 (Tuesday, Dec. 1, 2020)	John Legend	4	Bailey Rae	"Never Again, Again"	Wild Card winner

Non-competition performances (Note: Pre-recorded performances)
Order	Performer(s)	Song
13.1	Top 20 (Top 17 and the four-way knockout contestants)	"Minefields"

=== Week 2: Semi-finals – Fan Week (Dec. 7–8) ===
The Top 9 artists sing a new song dedicated to their own fans and also combine for special trios with one another. In the results, the top vote-getter from each team will advance to the finale and the rest of the artists will sing for the instant save.

Semi-finals results
Episode	Coach	Order	Artist	Solo Song	Triplet Song	Results
Episode 15 (Monday, Dec. 7, 2020)	Blake Shelton	1 (3)	Jim Ranger	"Without You"	"Will It Go Round in Circles"	Public's vote
Episode 15 (Monday, Dec. 7, 2020)	Kelly Clarkson	2 (9)	Cami Clune	"The Joke"	"Pompeii"	Not selected
Episode 15 (Monday, Dec. 7, 2020)	Gwen Stefani	4 (6)	Ben Allen	"All About Tonight"	"Tulsa Time"	Not selected
Episode 15 (Monday, Dec. 7, 2020)	John Legend	5 (9)	John Holiday	"Fix You"	"Pompeii"	Public's vote
Episode 15 (Monday, Dec. 7, 2020)	Kelly Clarkson	7 (3)	DeSz	"Don't Let Go (Love)"	"Will It Go Round in Circles"	Public's vote
Episode 15 (Monday, Dec. 7, 2020)	John Legend	8 (9)	Bailey Rae	"Georgia On My Mind"	"Pompeii"	Not selected
Episode 15 (Monday, Dec. 7, 2020)	Blake Shelton	10 (6)	Ian Flanigan	"Angel"	"Tulsa Time"	Not selected
Episode 15 (Monday, Dec. 7, 2020)	John Legend	11 (6)	Tamara Jade	"Let It Be"	"Tulsa Time"	Not selected
Episode 15 (Monday, Dec. 7, 2020)	Gwen Stefani	12 (3)	Carter Rubin	"Rainbow Connection"	"Will It Go Round in Circles"	Public's vote
Episode 16 (Tuesday, Dec. 8, 2020)	Gwen Stefani	1	Ben Allen	"Prayed for You"		Eliminated
Episode 16 (Tuesday, Dec. 8, 2020)	Kelly Clarkson	2	Cami Clune	"When the Party's Over"		Eliminated
Episode 16 (Tuesday, Dec. 8, 2020)	John Legend	3	Bailey Rae	"Your Cheatin' Heart"		Eliminated
Episode 16 (Tuesday, Dec. 8, 2020)	John Legend	4	Tamara Jade	"Feeling Good"		Eliminated
Episode 16 (Tuesday, Dec. 8, 2020)	Blake Shelton	5	Ian Flanigan	"Anymore"		Instant Save

Non-competition performances
Order	Performer(s)	Song
15.1	Gwen Stefani	"Let Me Reintroduce Myself"
16.1	Kelly Clarkson and Brett Eldredge	"Under the Mistletoe"
16.2	John Legend	"Wild"

=== Week 3: Finale (Dec. 14–15) ===
The final five performed on Monday, December 14, 2020, with the final results the following day. In the first episode of the finale, each artist performed an original song and a cover. In the second episode, each artist performed a duet with their respective coach.

Coach	Artist	Episode 17 (Monday, Dec. 14, 2020)				Episode 19 (Tuesday, Dec. 15, 2020)		Result
Coach	Artist	Order	Solo Song	Order	Original Song	Order	Duet (with Coach)	Result
Gwen Stefani	Carter Rubin	1	"The Climb"	9	"Up from Here"	15	"You Make It Feel Like Christmas"	Winner
Kelly Clarkson	DeSz	6	"Landslide"	2	"Holy Ground"	11	"I'm Every Woman"	Fourth place
Blake Shelton	Ian Flanigan	3	"In Color"	7	"Never Learn"	13	"Mammas Don't Let Your Babies Grow Up to Be Cowboys"	Third place
Blake Shelton	Jim Ranger	10	"With a Little Help from My Friends"	4	"Last"	14	"Streets of Bakersfield"	Runner-up
John Legend	John Holiday	8	"Halo"	5	"Where Do We Go"	12	"Bridge Over Troubled Water"	Fifth place

Non-competition performances
Order	Performer(s)	Song
17.1	Blake Shelton and Gwen Stefani	"Happy Anywhere"
19.1	Top 20 (Top 17 and the four-way knockout contestants)	"Rockin' Around the Christmas Tree"
19.2	Nelly featuring Florida Georgia Line	"Lil Bit"
19.3	Lewis Capaldi	"Before You Go"
19.4	24kGoldn featuring Iann Dior	"Mood"
19.5	Lauren Daigle	"You Say"
19.6	Jason Derulo	"Take You Dancing" / "Savage Love"
19.7	Dan + Shay	"Take Me Home for Christmas"
19.8	Julia Michaels featuring JP Saxe	"If the World Was Ending"
19.9	Keith Urban featuring Pink	"One Too Many"

== Elimination chart ==
Results color key
Winner	Saved by Instant Save (via Voice App)
Runner up	Saved by the public
Third Place	Saved by their coach
Fourth place	Saved by Wild Card (via Voice App)
Fifth place	Eliminated

Coaches color key
Team Kelly
Team Gwen
Team Legend
Team Blake

=== Overall ===
Live shows results per week
Artists	Week 1	Week 2	Week 3 Finale
Carter Rubin	Safe	Safe	Winner
Jim Ranger	Safe	Safe	Runner-up
Ian Flanigan	Safe	Safe	3rd place
DeSz	Safe	Safe	4th place
John Holiday	Safe	Safe	5th place
Ben Allen	Safe	Eliminated	Eliminated (Week 2)
Cami Clune	Safe	Eliminated	Eliminated (Week 2)
Tamara Jade	Safe	Eliminated	Eliminated (Week 2)
Bailey Rae	Safe	Eliminated	Eliminated (Week 2)
Payge Turner	Eliminated	Eliminated (Week 1)	
Tanner Gomes	Eliminated	Eliminated (Week 1)	
Worth the Wait	Eliminated	Eliminated (Week 1)	
Chloé Hogan	Eliminated	Eliminated (Week 1)	
Joseph Soul	Eliminated	Eliminated (Week 1)	
Madeline Consoer	Eliminated	Eliminated (Week 1)	
Sid Kingsley	Eliminated	Eliminated (Week 1)	
Taryn Papa	Eliminated	Eliminated (Week 1)	

=== Teams ===
Live shows results per team
Artists	Week 1	Week 2	Week 3 Finale
DeSz	Advanced	Advanced	Fourth place
Cami Clune	Advanced	Eliminated	
Tanner Gomes	Eliminated		
Madeline Consoer	Eliminated		
Carter Rubin	Advanced	Advanced	Winner
Ben Allen	Advanced	Eliminated	
Payge Turner	Eliminated		
Joseph Soul	Eliminated		
John Holiday	Advanced	Advanced	Fifth place
Tamara Jade	Advanced	Eliminated	
Bailey Rae	Advanced	Eliminated	
Chloé Hogan	Eliminated		
Jim Ranger	Advanced	Advanced	Runner-up
Ian Flanigan	Advanced	Advanced	Third place
Worth the Wait	Eliminated		
Sid Kingsley	Eliminated		
Taryn Papa	Eliminated		

Rank	Coach	Top 17	Top 9	Top 5
1	Gwen Stefani	4	2	1
2	Blake Shelton	5	2	2
3	Kelly Clarkson	4	2	1
4	John Legend	4	3	1

== Ratings ==
Viewership and ratings per episode of The Voice season 19
No.	Title	Air date	Timeslot (ET)	Rating (18–49)	Viewers (millions)
1	"The Blind Auditions Premiere, Part 1"	October 19, 2020	Monday 8:00 p.m.	1.2	8.20
2	"The Blind Auditions Premiere, Part 2"	October 20, 2020	Tuesday 8:00 p.m.	1.1	7.73
3	"The Blind Auditions, Part 3"	October 26, 2020	Monday 8:00 p.m.	1.0	7.60
4	"The Blind Auditions, Part 4"	October 27, 2020	Tuesday 8:00 p.m.	1.0	7.76
5	"The Blind Auditions, Part 5"	November 2, 2020	Monday 8:00 p.m.	1.1	7.71
6	"The Battles Begin"	November 9, 2020	Monday 8:00 p.m.	1.0	7.27
7	"The Battles, Part 2"	November 10, 2020	Tuesday 8:00 p.m.	1.1	7.64
8	"The Battles, Part 3"	November 16, 2020	Monday 8:00 p.m.	0.9	6.92
9	"The Knockouts Premiere"	November 17, 2020	Tuesday 8:00 p.m.	1.1	7.54
10	"The Knockouts, Part 2"	November 23, 2020	Monday 8:00 p.m.	0.9	7.07
11	"The Knockouts, Part 3"	November 24, 2020	Tuesday 8:00 p.m.	1.0	7.06
12	"Live Top 17 Performances"	November 30, 2020	Monday 8:00 p.m.	0.9	7.17
13	"Live Top 17 Results"	December 1, 2020	Tuesday 8:00 p.m.	0.8	7.13
14	"The Voice Holiday Celebration"	December 3, 2020	Thursday 8:00 p.m.	0.7	5.46
15	"Live Top 9 Performances"	December 7, 2020	Monday 8:00 p.m.	0.8	6.95
16	"Live Top 9 Results"	December 8, 2020	Tuesday 8:00 p.m.	0.7	6.64
17	"Live Finale Part 1"	December 14, 2020	Monday 8:00 p.m.	0.9	7.09
18	"Live Finale Cutdown Show"	December 15, 2020	Tuesday 8:00 p.m.	0.7	5.89
19	"Live Finale Part 2"	December 15, 2020	Tuesday 9:00 p.m.	0.9	7.26
