= Derek Lee Ragin =

American countertenor

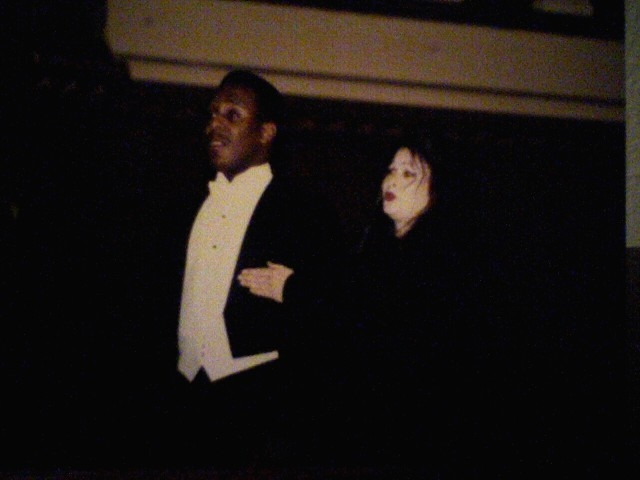
Derek Lee Ragin and Tracey Mitchell in the Opera Quotannis production of Orfeo ed Euridice, 1991.

Derek Lee Ragin (born June 17, 1958) is an American countertenor.

== Early life ==
Derek Ragin was born in West Point, New York and grew up in Newark, New Jersey. He began his formal voice training with the Newark Boys Chorus, and studied as a piano and music education major at the Oberlin Conservatory of Music. While at Oberlin, he also took secondary voice lessons with Richard Anderson, and began his operatic career at Oberlin in Benjamin Britten's A Midsummer Night's Dream as Oberon. After leaving Oberlin, Ragin worked with singer Max van Egmond for a summer session at BPI and went to Europe to pursue his career in Baroque opera.

== Career ==
Ragin gained fame by winning the 1983 Purcell-Britten Prize for Concert Singers in England, the Prix Spécial du Jury du Grand Prix Lyrique de Monte Carlo in 1988, and First Prize at the 35th ARD International Music Competition in Munich in 1986.

He had made his London recital debut at Wigmore Hall in 1984. He also sang Joe in the 1986 Crucible Theatre Sheffield production of Carmen Jones. This was followed by a debut at the Metropolitan Opera in 1988 in George Frideric Handel's Giulio Cesare, a recital at the Metropolitan Museum of Art in 1991, and a performance at the Salzburg Festival in Christoph Willibald Gluck's Orfeo ed Euridice with the Monteverdi Choir and Orchestra in 1990.

In 1991, he released a disc of spirituals entitled Ev'ry Time I Feel the Spirit (recorded with Moses Hogan and his New World Ensemble).

His recording of Leonard Bernstein's Chichester Psalms and the world premiere of the composer's Missa Brevis with the Atlanta Symphony Orchestra and Robert Shaw won a Grammy Award, and his recording of Giulio Cesare with Concerto Köln received a Gramophone Award in 1992.

For the soundtrack of the 1994 film Farinelli, his voice was electronically blended with that of soprano Ewa Malas-Godlewska to recreate the famous castrato's voice. He also recorded extensively for the Telarc, Philips, EMI, Erato and Capriccio labels, including Italian lute songs, G.F. Handel cantatas.

Shortly after his Salzburg performance of Orfeo ed Euridice, he sang the role of Orfeo on the Philips recording of the opera with Sylvia McNair as Euridice and Sir John Eliot Gardiner conducting the English Baroque Soloists and the Monteverdi Choir. Farinelli, the film about the 18th century castrato won the Golden Globe Award for Best Foreign Film in 1995, and the soundtrack won the Golden Record award the following year in Cannes.
