= Idaspe =

Opera by Riccardo Broschi

Idaspe is an opera by baroque composer Riccardo Broschi. It is notable for starring the composer’s brother, Farinelli, in the role of Dario. The famous arias Qual guerrero in campo armato, and Ombra fedele anch’io are from this opera.

== Roles ==
- Artaserse, king of Persia, in love with Berenice
- Dario, brother of Artaserse and friend of Idaspe, who disguises himself as Arbato, a general.
- Idaspe, nephew of Artaserse, disguised as Acrone
- Arbace, captain of the guard
- Mandane, daughter of the king of Media, in love with Dario
- Berenice, a Persian princess.
