= The Voice (American TV series) =

American talent competition series

- Genre: Reality competition
- Created by: John de Mol Jr.
- Directed by: Alan Carter
- Presented by: Carson Daly
- Judges: The Voice coaches
- Composer: Martijn Schimmer
- Country of origin: United States
- Original language: English
- No. of seasons: 30
- No. of episodes: 689

Production
- Executive producers: John de Mol Jr.; Mark Burnett; Audrey Morrissey; Stijn Bakkers; Marc Jansen; Jay Bienstock; Lee Metzger
- Producers: Ashley Baumann; Amanda Borden; Carson Daly; Keith Dinielli; May Johnson; Bart Kimball; Michael Matsumoto; David Offenheiser; Dan Paschen; Kyley Tucker; Teddy Valenti
- Production locations: Universal Studios Hollywood, Universal City, California
- Camera setup: Multi-camera
- Running time: 44–104 minutes
- Production companies: Mark Burnett Productions (2011–2012); One Three Media (2012–2014); United Artists Media Group (2014–2016); MGM Television (2016–present); Warner Horizon Unscripted Television (Note: Known as Warner Horizon Television for the first 18 seasons.); Talpa Media (2011–2019); ITV America (2020–present)

Original release
- Network: NBC
- Release: April 26, 2011 – present

Related
- The Voice (franchise); La Voz

The Voice is an American singing reality competition television series that premiered on NBC on April 26, 2011. Based on the original The Voice of Holland and part of The Voice franchise, it has aired 29 seasons and aims to find unsigned singing talent (solo or duets, professional and amateur) contested by aspiring singers drawn from public auditions. Singers must be at least 13 years of age to compete.

The winner is determined by television viewers voting by telephone, internet, SMS text, and iTunes Store purchases of the audio-recorded artists' vocal performances. They receive US$100,000 and a record deal with Universal Music Group for winning the competition. The winners of the twenty-nine seasons have been: Javier Colon, Jermaine Paul, Cassadee Pope, Danielle Bradbery, Tessanne Chin, Josh Kaufman, Craig Wayne Boyd, Sawyer Fredericks, Jordan Smith, Alisan Porter, Sundance Head, Chris Blue, Chloe Kohanski, Brynn Cartelli, Chevel Shepherd, Maelyn Jarmon, Jake Hoot, Todd Tilghman, Carter Rubin, Cam Anthony, Girl Named Tom, Bryce Leatherwood, Gina Miles, Huntley, Asher HaVon, Sofronio Vasquez, Adam David, Aiden Ross, and Alexia Jayy. Notable contestants who did not win but went on to have success on the Billboard charts afterwards include Morgan Wallen, Melanie Martinez, Libianca, Christina Grimmie, Loren Allred, Nicolle Galyon, Koryn Hawthorne and Fousheé.

The series employs a panel of four (or three) coaches who critique the artists' performances and guide their teams of selected artists through the remainder of the season. They also compete to ensure that their act wins the competition, thus making them the winning coach. The original panel featured Christina Aguilera, CeeLo Green, Adam Levine, and Blake Shelton; the panel for the current thirtieth season features Levine, Kelly Clarkson, Riley Green, and Queen Latifah. Other coaches from previous seasons include Shakira, Usher, Gwen Stefani, Pharrell Williams, Miley Cyrus, Alicia Keys, Jennifer Hudson, John Legend, Nick Jonas, Ariana Grande, Camila Cabello, Chance the Rapper, Niall Horan, Reba McEntire, Dan + Shay, Michael Bublé, Snoop Dogg and Kelsea Ballerini. In the fifteenth season, Ballerini was featured as an off-screen fifth coach for "Comeback Stage" contestants. Bebe Rexha took over as the "Comeback Stage" coach for the sixteenth season.

== Concept ==
An adaptation of the Dutch show The Voice of Holland, NBC announced the show under the name The Voice of America in December 2010; its name was soon shortened to The Voice due to the association of the former name with a popular American news and radio broadcaster. Notably, the American edition of the series is the only one in the franchise that does not feature its country's name. In each season, the winner receives $100,000 and a record deal with Universal Republic Records (seasons 1 and 2) or later Universal Music Group (season 3–present).

== Selection process and format ==
Title card of the show

Each season begins with the "Blind Auditions", where coaches form their team of artists whom they mentor through the remainder of the season. The number of artists varies per season, with a set range between 8 and 16 artists. The coaches' chairs are faced towards the audience during artists' performances; those interested in an artist press their button, which turns their chair towards the artist and illuminates the bottom of the chair to read "I want you." At the conclusion of the performance, an artist either defaults to the only coach who turned around or selects their coach if more than one coach expresses interest. Introduced in the 14th season is "Block", which allows one coach to block another coach from getting a contestant. The "Block" has been used in every season since its inception except for seasons twenty-nine and thirty. Introduced in the 26th season was the "Coach Replay" where the coaches can save an eliminated artist who had no chairs turn and have them default to their team. The "Coach Replay" returned for season 27 under a new format, a coach may use it if he/she did not originally turn around and if one or more of the other coaches did turn to make the coach who did not turn eligible for the artist to choose. The "Coach Replay" did not return for season 28. However, a new feature was introduced, dubbed the "Carson Callback". This feature allows Carson Daly to select one artist to audition again after previously failing to make a team.

In the "Battle Rounds", each coach pairs two of their team members to perform together, then chooses one to advance in the competition. Each coach is assisted by different celebrity advisors which vary each season. In season one, coaches sit alongside their respective advisors in the battle stage; however, the advisors no longer join the coaches in the battle stage starting season two. In season 23, there are no advisors and its coach assumed the duties for advising the artists alone. season three introduced "steals", allowing each coach to save/select individuals who were eliminated during a battle round by another coach. First seen in the eighth season, artists are either given a walkover or is reassigned to a three-way battle in the event of another artist withdrawing from the competition if each coach sees fit. Saves were also added starting season 14, which lets a coach prevent someone that they eliminated on their team from going home; in seasons 23 and 25, Saves are replaced with "Playoff Pass" (based on the Battle Pass from the Australian version) which allow one artist to exempt them from participating in the Knockouts and directly advance to the Playoffs (the other artist advancing to the Knockouts as usual). In season 29, the "Super Steal" was introduced allowing the coach to override other steals in the round to acquire the artist.

The Knockout Rounds were also introduced in season three (except for seasons six and sixteen). A pair of artists within a team are selected to sing individual performances in succession. They are not told until a few minutes prior to their performances who their partner is. The artists get to choose their own songs in this round, although they continue to get help and advice from their respective coaches, and since season six, a celebrity advisor serving as a mega mentor (except seasons 14, 22 and 27). At the conclusion of the performances, coaches would decide which one of each pair gets to advance to the next round. Similar to the battle rounds, the coaches can steal one eliminated artist from another coach starting with season five. Starting in season 14, coaches can save one eliminated artist from their own team. From season 18 till 20, artists who were saved faced a Four-Way Knockout, with the winner decided through a public vote. In seasons 22, 24 and 26, this round featured trio pairings. In season twenty-four coaches were able to save one eliminated artist from their team or another coach's team in a twist called the "Super Save".

The "Battles, Round 2" were introduced to replace the Knockout Rounds in season six. Similar to the Knockout Rounds, each singer is paired within their team. One celebrity key adviser also assists all four of the coaches and their teams in preparation of these rounds. Coaches give each Battle pairing a list of songs and each pair must agree on which song to sing. Like the first Battle round, each coach can still decide which of their singers in each pair will advance to the next round, and also allowed one steal.

In the sixteenth season, the knockouts were replaced by The Live Cross Battles, a format identical to the Cross Battles from the Chinese version of The Voice. Each coach selects an artist to perform with another coach's artist together. The artist that receives the public vote will move on to the Playoffs, while the losing artist risks being eliminated from the competition or could be save by their coach or stolen by another coach. Like the knockouts, each coach had 1 save and 1 steal. The Live Cross Battles did not return in season seventeen due to poor reception.

Previously eliminated artists can also advance to compete in the live shows; between seasons nine and thirteen (except season 11), each coach saved one artist (from either the Battle or Knockout rounds) to put through to the Live Playoffs. For seasons 15 and 16, selected singers (prior to the Live elimination rounds) are put through to the "Comeback Stage" (which would be mentored by a fifth coach) and competed in a series of duels for a place in the live shows, with the winner earning a right to join a team of their choice. Season 21 added "Voice Comeback" where each coach picked one artist to compete in a Twitter poll, and only one artist with the most votes moves on.

In the final live performance phase of the competition (playoffs and elimination rounds), artists perform in weekly shows, where public voting narrows to a final group of artists and eventually declares a winner.

Under the current format since season three in favor on a more competitive standard previously seen on other similar reality shows, any artists, regardless of each team, who earned the lowest number of votes were progressively eliminated each week until five artists remain (three until season six, then four prior to season 17), hence introducing a possibility where at least one coach would not represent a single artist in the finale.

Prior to season three, the coaches have the power to save one artist that had not received the public's vote that week, and as of season two, "last chance performance" are added where artists performed an additional song to vie for their coach's save, or other twists employed such as "instant elimination", where an artist faced immediate elimination without going through a public vote. However, in deciding who moves on to the final four phase, the television audience and the coaches have equal say. With one team member remaining for each coach, the contestants compete against each other in the finale, where the outcome is decided solely by public vote. Season 18–20 temporarily reverted this format allowing each coach to guarantee at least one artist advancing in the finale to accommodate the short number of live shows at three weeks, but these changes were reversed on Season 21 by reverting to the regular elimination format while retaining the top five finalists.

=== Voting system ===
In a first for a music competition series, NBC and Universal Republic Records offered fans of the show the ability to vote for their favorite artists by purchasing the studio versions of the songs that they perform on the live show each week via the iTunes Store. Alternative methods of voting can be done through toll-free phone calls (until season eight), text messaging, "The Voice Official App on NBC" app, and online votes via NBC.com and Facebook. Each method is limited to ten votes per user and voting lasts until noon EST the next day.

From the top 12 results show of season three to the end of season 17, a rule regarding voting was enacted with regard to iTunes singles purchases. In the first two seasons, voting via iTunes purchases of contestant performances counted singly during the official voting window and only accredited to the live show in concern. When a competitor's performance peaked within the Top 10 of the iTunes "Top 200 Singles Chart" during this window, it was given an iTunes bonus that multiplies iTunes votes made by ten. In season five, the iTunes bonus multiplier was reduced to five for the studio versions of the songs performed by the competitors. The finale's vote count included a 'Cumulative iTunes Vote Total' of all singles (from the live shows onwards) purchased during and outside of the various voting windows, with iTunes bonuses previously earned. Between seasons 15 and 17, the bonus multiplier was revised to include streams counting as a vote, and the only artist with the most streams after the voting window ended would receive the bonus. The iTunes bonus multiplier was discontinued beginning with the live shows of season 18, as the performances are now recorded away from the studios and could not be recorded to iTunes or Spotify; this measure was initially enacted for safety reasons as a result of the COVID-19 outbreak. In season 19, studio performances are now recorded on YouTube Music, replacing the traditional iTunes and Spotify recordings that were done between the seasons 2–17, but this was changed back beginning season 20, though bonuses do not apply regardless if the song charted within the top 10 or not. Season 22 was the first season to not have any studio performances released on any platform overall.

Only the studio recording of the contestants' performances, not the live performance, were available on iTunes. In the first season, the battle rounds were recorded in the studio with both artists in the pairing. However, from season two to season 18, only the winner's version of the song from the battle round was released. Season seven reverted to the old style of both artists. With the introduction of the Knockout Rounds in season three, where each contestant sang a separate song, only the winner's single was released.

The "Instant Save" was introduced in season five. During the live elimination episodes, viewers are given a five-minute window to vote for the contestants at risk of elimination by using their Twitter account (and since season 17, the official app) to decide which contestant will move on to the next show, starting with the Top 13. Home viewers can only vote once per account for one contestant of their choice. Since season six, the instant saves now function as a last-chance performance where artists perform an additional song to rally votes.

== Coaches and hosts ==
Coaches and Host for the current season of The Voice

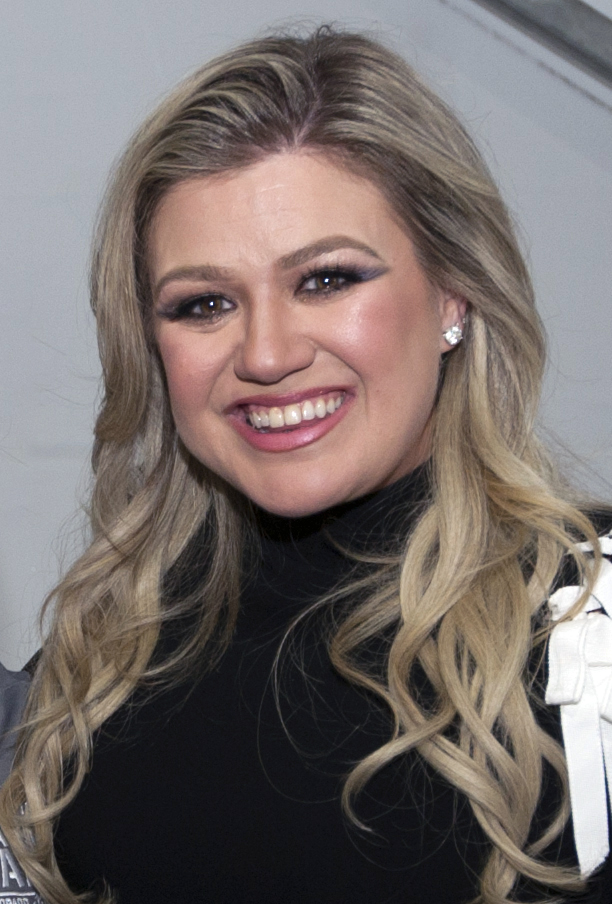
Kelly Clarkson

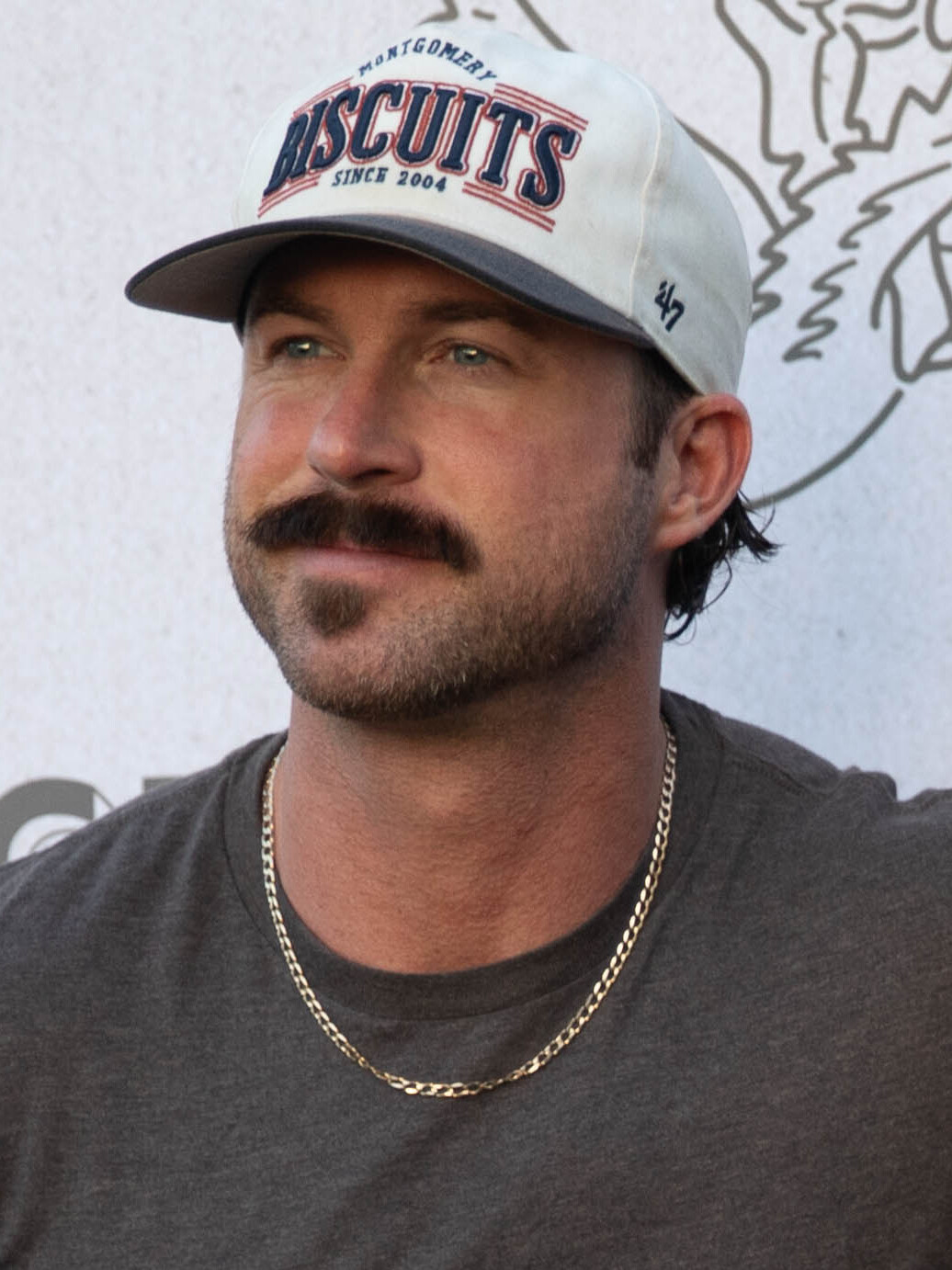
Riley Green

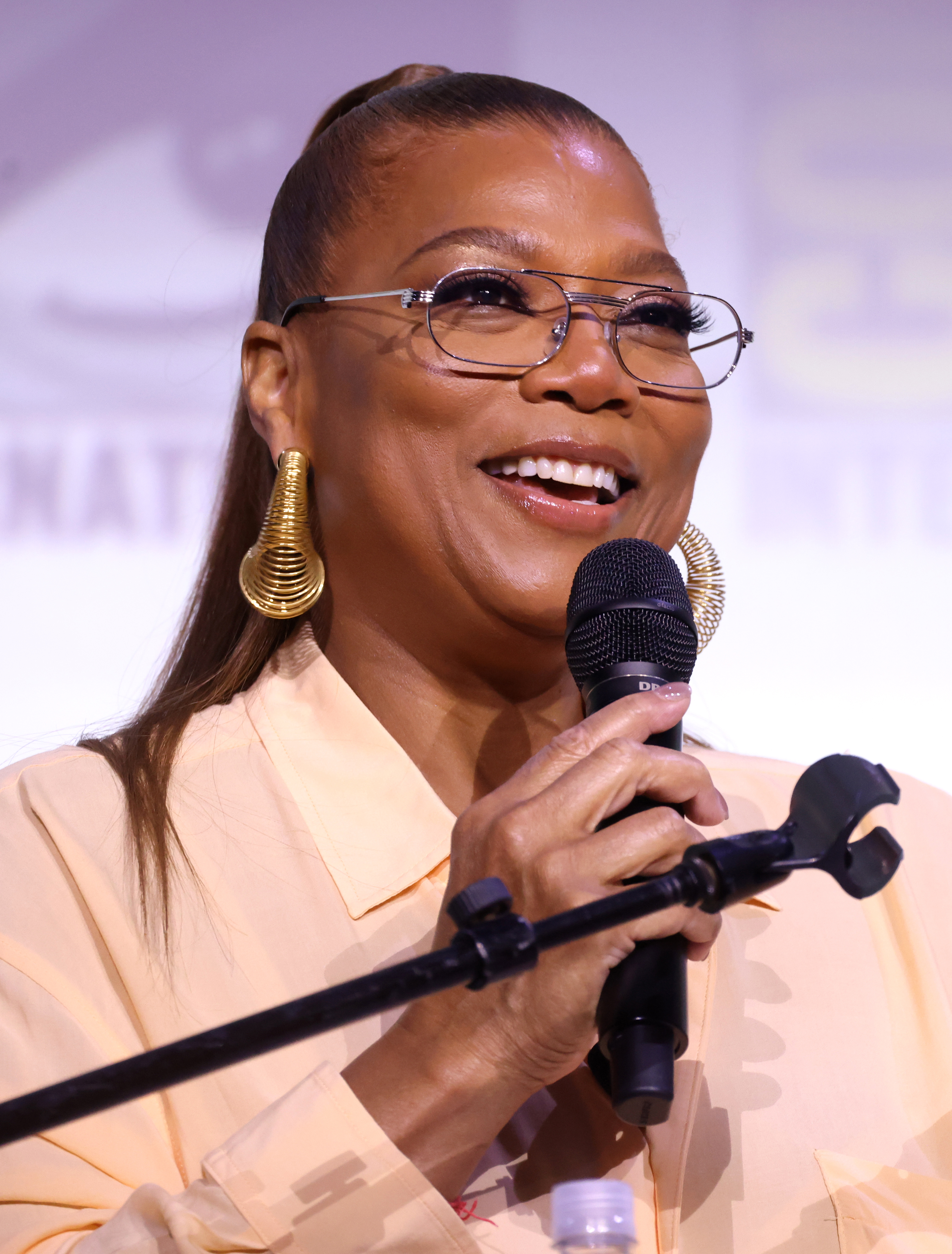
Queen Latifah

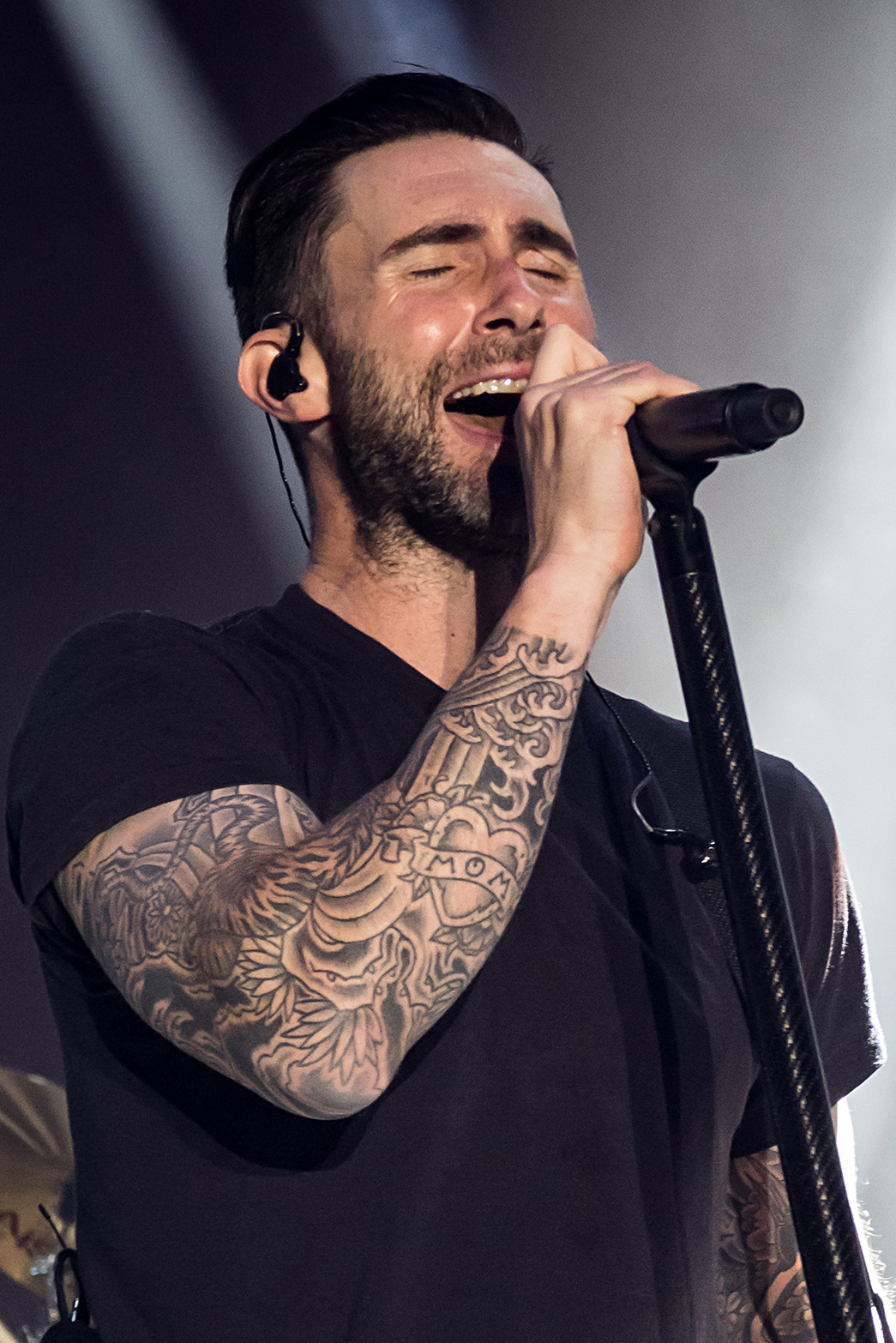
Adam Levine

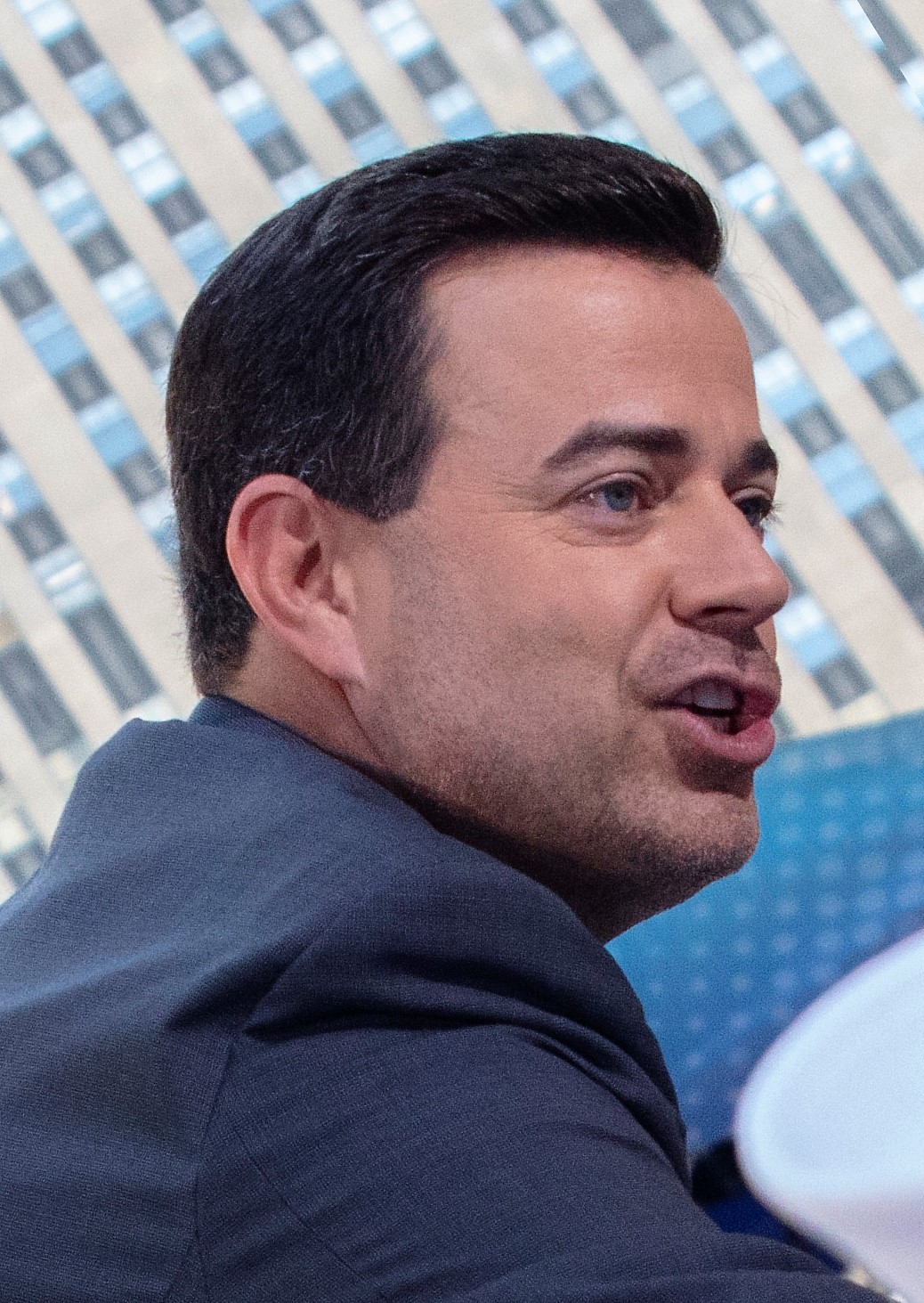
Carson Daly (host)

CeeLo Green of Gnarls Barkley and Adam Levine of Maroon 5 became the first confirmed coaches in February 2011, followed by Christina Aguilera and Blake Shelton in March. Aguilera and Green did not return for season four and were replaced by Shakira and Usher. Aguilera and Green then returned for season five, while Shakira and Usher returned for season six. In an interview with Ellen DeGeneres in February 2014, Green revealed that he would not be returning to The Voice. On March 31, 2014, it was announced that Pharrell Williams would become Green's replacement. On April 29, 2014, it was announced that No Doubt's Gwen Stefani would replace Aguilera in season seven due to her pregnancy. On May 20, 2014, Shakira and Usher confirmed that after season six, they would focus on their music. On March 25, 2016, Miley Cyrus confirmed that following her role as key advisor during the tenth season that she would be joining the series once again in its eleventh season as a coach. That same day, Alicia Keys was also announced to be joining the series as a coach for the eleventh season. On October 18, 2016, it was announced that Stefani would re-join the coaches' panel for the series' twelfth season, alongside returning coaches Keys, Levine and Shelton; it was also confirmed that Cyrus would return for the thirteenth season.

On April 27, 2017, in an interview published by TV Insider, Keys confirmed that the twelfth season would be her last. She stated, "Who knows what the future holds, but I know this one is my final season." On May 10, 2017, NBC announced that Jennifer Hudson would join the coaches lineup for the series' thirteenth season alongside Cyrus, Levine and Shelton. On May 11, 2017, it was announced that Kelly Clarkson would be a coach in season fourteen in 2018. On October 18, 2017, NBC announced that Alicia Keys would return to the series for the 14th season. On May 10, 2018, it was announced that Hudson would return for the series' fifteenth season after a one-season hiatus joining Clarkson, Levine, and Shelton. Kelsea Ballerini also joined season fifteen as the fifth coach for the "Comeback Stage" of the competition. On September 13, 2018, John Legend was announced as a coach for the show's sixteenth season, alongside returning coaches Clarkson, Levine and Shelton. On February 25, 2019, it was announced that Bebe Rexha would be the fifth coach for season 16's "Comeback Stage".

In May 2019, it was announced that all four coaches from the sixteenth season would return for the series' seventeenth season. Later that month, it was announced that Levine would exit the series; Stefani was announced to be returning to the coaching panel as his successor. In October 2019, it was announced that Nick Jonas would join the show as a coach for its eighteenth season, alongside returning coaches Shelton, Clarkson and Legend. Stefani then returned for the nineteenth season, while Jonas later returned for the twentieth season. In March 2021, it was announced that Ariana Grande would replace Jonas for season twenty-one. In May 2022, it was announced that Stefani would be returning to the coaching panel for season twenty-two alongside returning coaches Legend and Shelton. It was later confirmed that Clarkson would also not be returning to the series in 2022, while Camila Cabello would enter the coaching panel as a new coach. On October 11, 2022, it was confirmed that Shelton and Clarkson would be returning for season 23, along with new coaches Chance the Rapper and Niall Horan. It was also announced that Shelton would leave the show after season 23.

On May 12, 2023, NBC announced the show would return for a 24th season in fall of the same year. The following day, it was announced that Reba McEntire would join the panel, alongside returning coaches Horan, Legend and Stefani. On June 21, 2023, NBC announced that the show would return for a 25th season which aired in the spring of 2024, in which a double chair was presented for the first time in the history of the show. The following day, it was announced that Dan + Shay would join the panel as the first duo coach on the American version, with returning coaches Legend, Chance the Rapper, and McEntire. On May 10, 2024, NBC announced that the show would return for a 26th season which aired in Fall 2024. On May 13, 2024, it was announced that McEntire and Stefani would return as coaches for the 26th season, while new coaches Snoop Dogg and Michael Bublé would replace Legend and Chance the Rapper.

On June 4, 2024, it was announced that the show had been renewed for a 27th season that aired in Spring 2025. The following day, it was announced that Levine would return to the panel after a 10-season hiatus, alongside returning coaches Bublé and Legend, while season 15 "Comeback Stage" coach Kelsea Ballerini would be joining the panel as a main coach. On April 23, 2025, it was announced that Snoop Dogg would return to the panel after a one-season hiatus for the twenty-eighth season. On May 12, 2025, it was announced that Bublé, Horan and McEntire would also return for the twenty-eighth season.

On July 22, 2025, it was announced that the 29th season had been renewed and set to air in early 2026. For the first time in the show's history, the panel consists of only three coaches: Legend, Levine, and Clarkson. The season is also dubbed "Battle of Champions" due to the coaches' winning records.

On April 14, 2026, directly following the conclusion on season 29, Levine confirmed that he would be returning for the 30th season. On May 7, 2026, it was revealed Clarkson would also return for the 30th season. On May 9, 2026, the show announced Riley Green as a new coach for the 30th season. On May 12, 2026, Queen Latifah was announced as the fourth coach for the 30th season.

On August 4, 2026, it was announced that the 31st season would air in early 2027. The season is dubbed The Voice: Celebrity and will feature a celebrity cast as the artists. Green and Latifah will return from the 30th season alongside former The Voice Australia coach, Joe Jonas. Additionally, Daly was announced to depart as host for the season and will be replaced by Keke Palmer.

=== Gallery ===
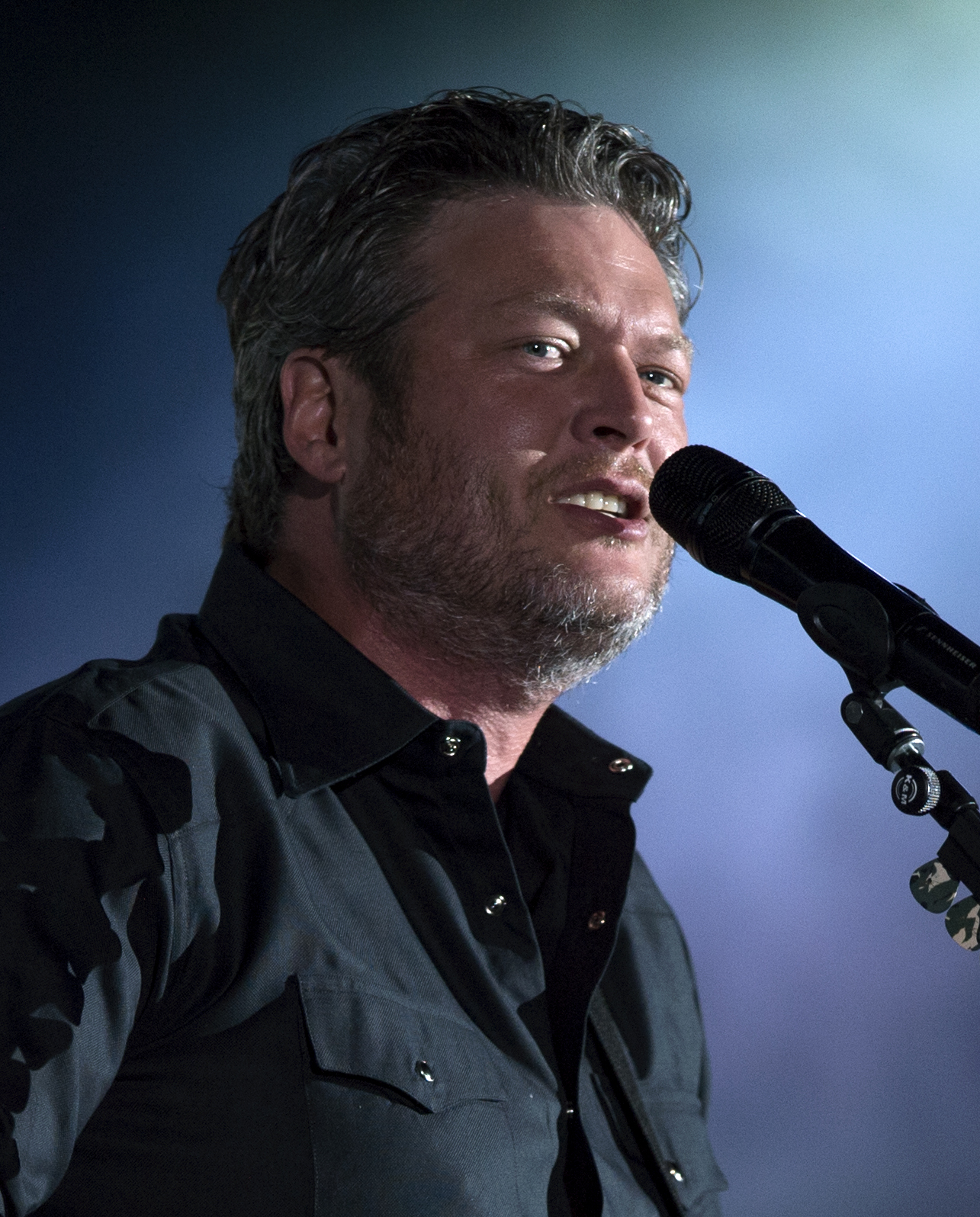
Blake Shelton (1–23)

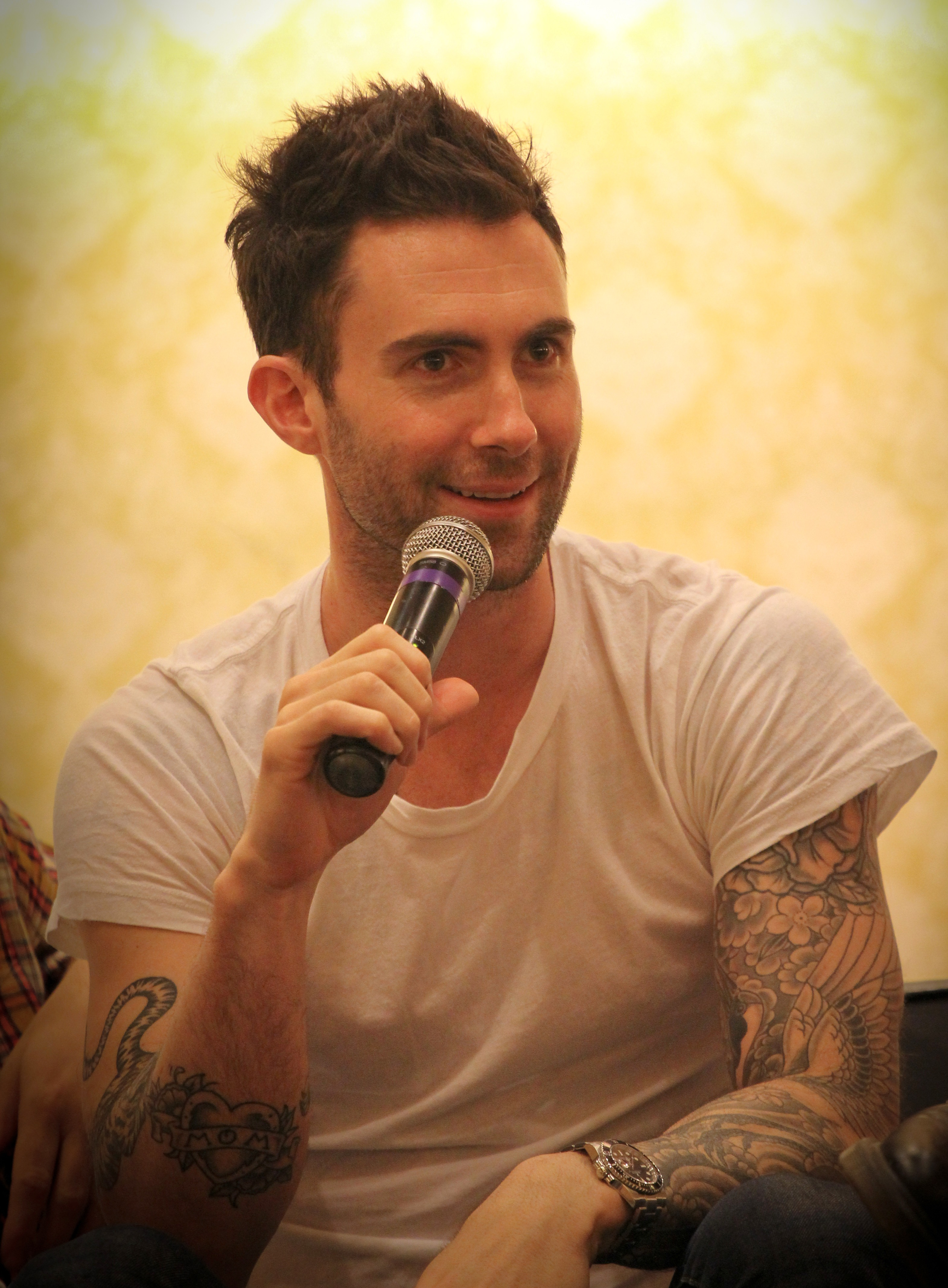
Adam Levine (1–16, 27, 29–30)

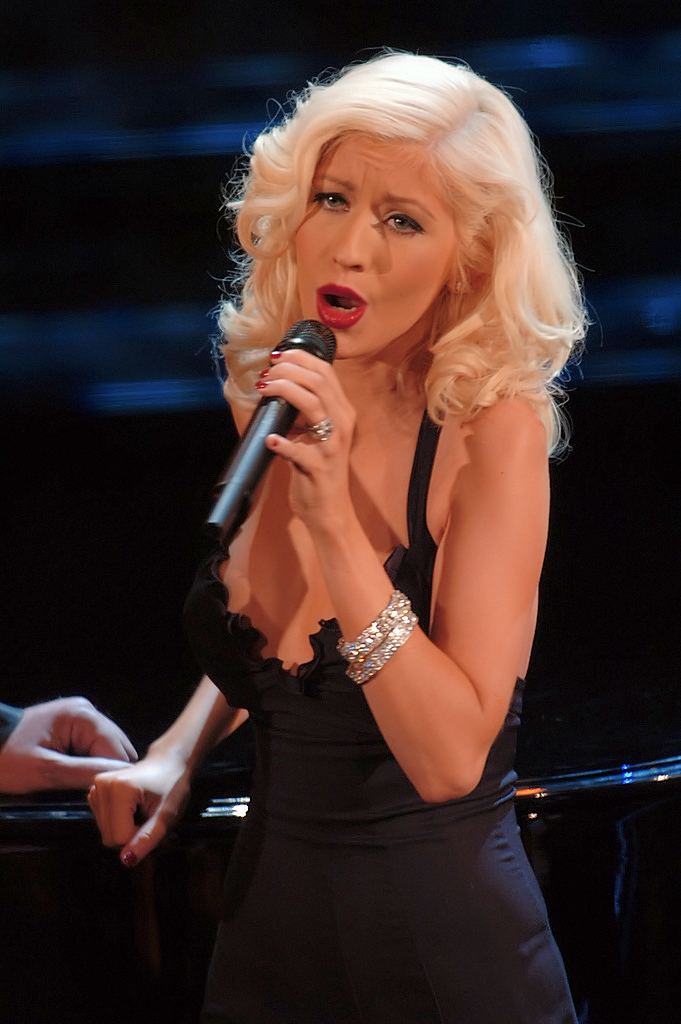
Christina Aguilera (1–3, 5, 8, 10)

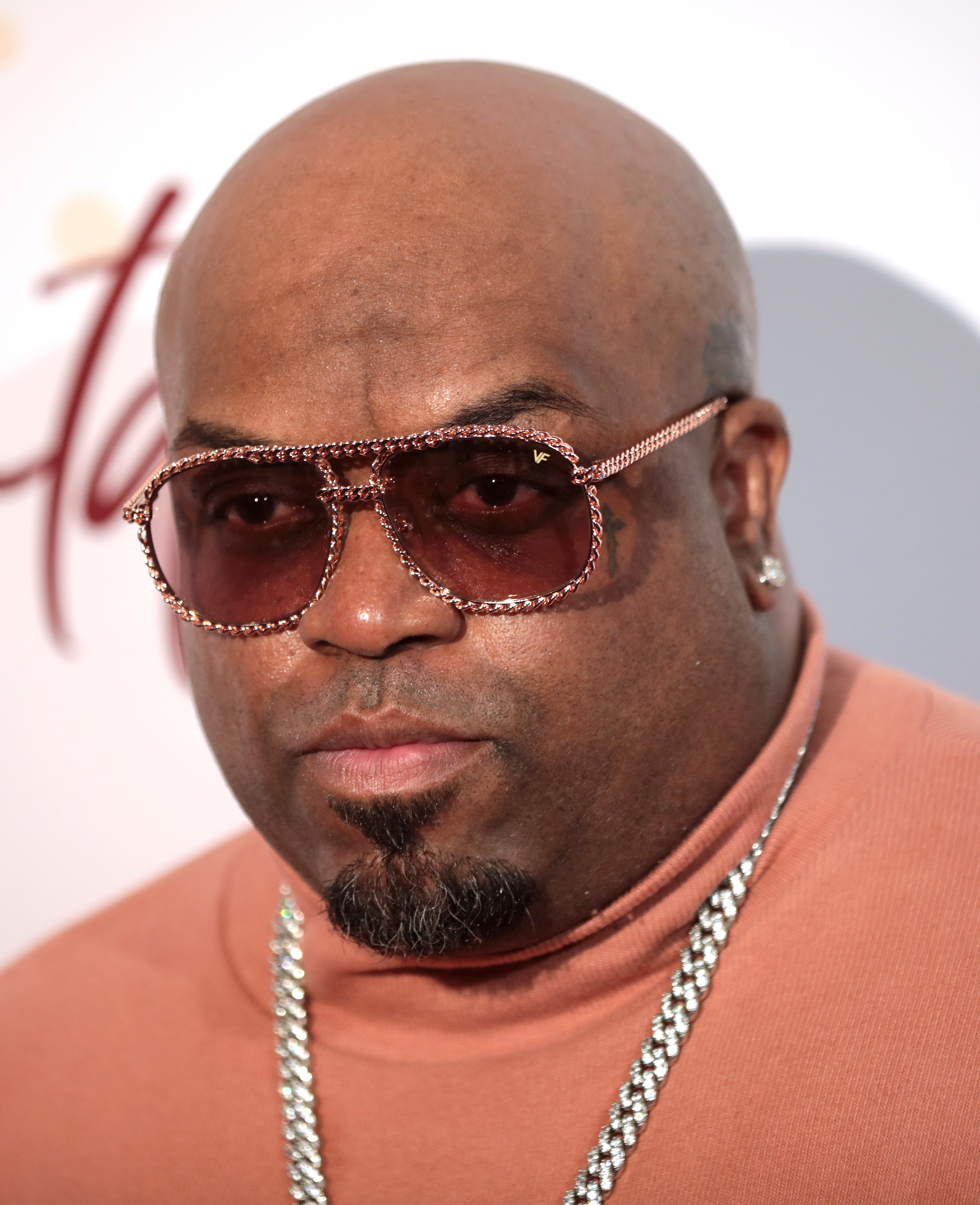
CeeLo Green (1–3, 5)

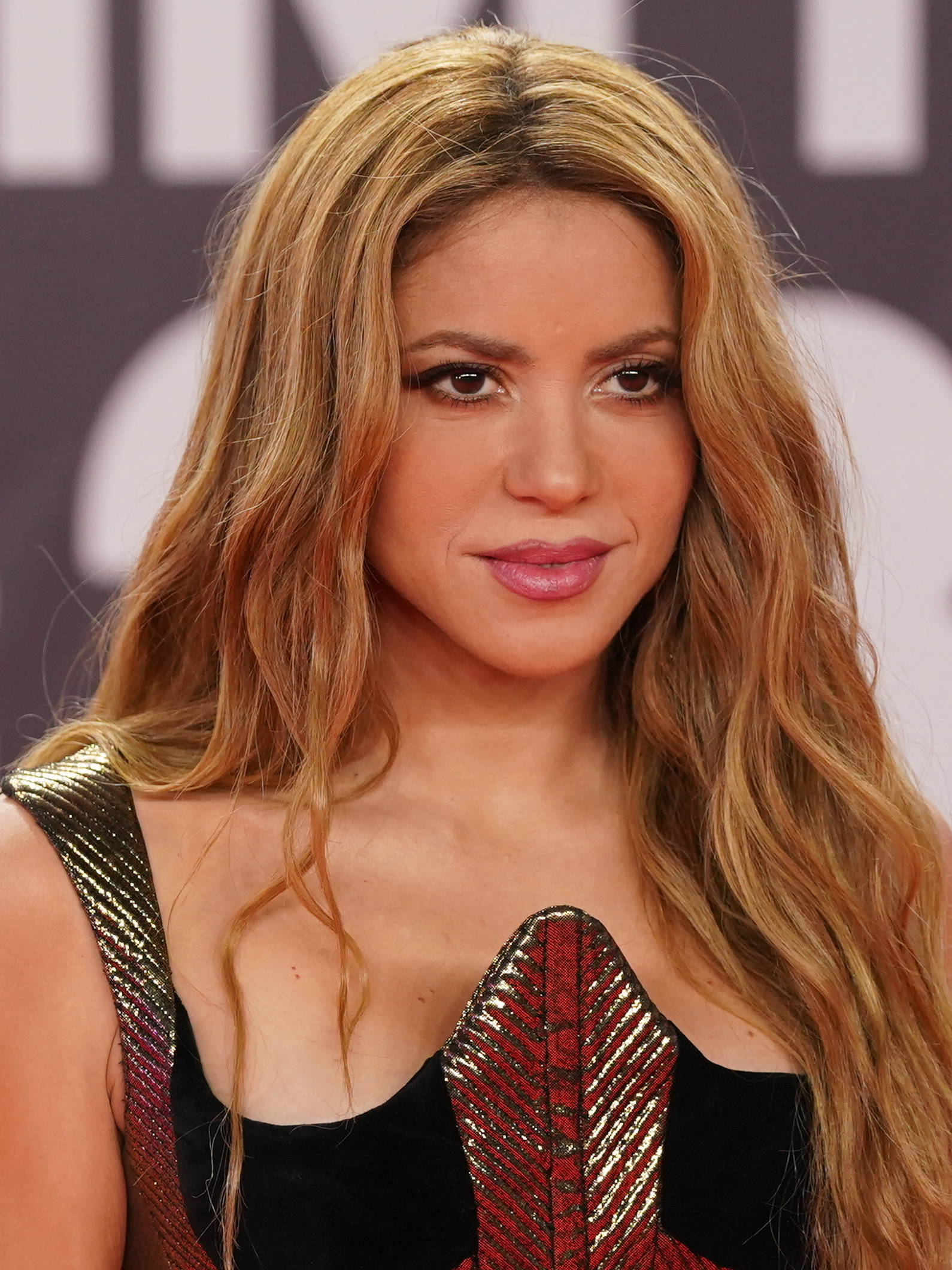
Shakira (4, 6)

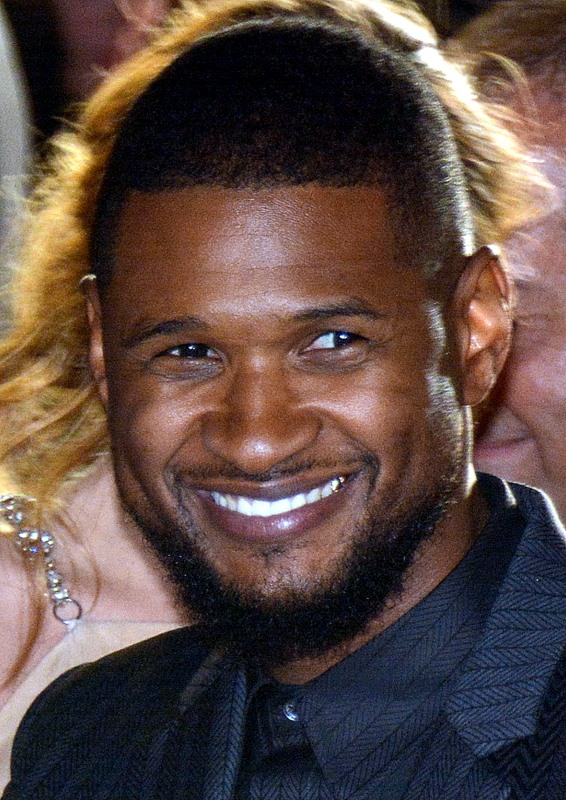
Usher (4, 6)

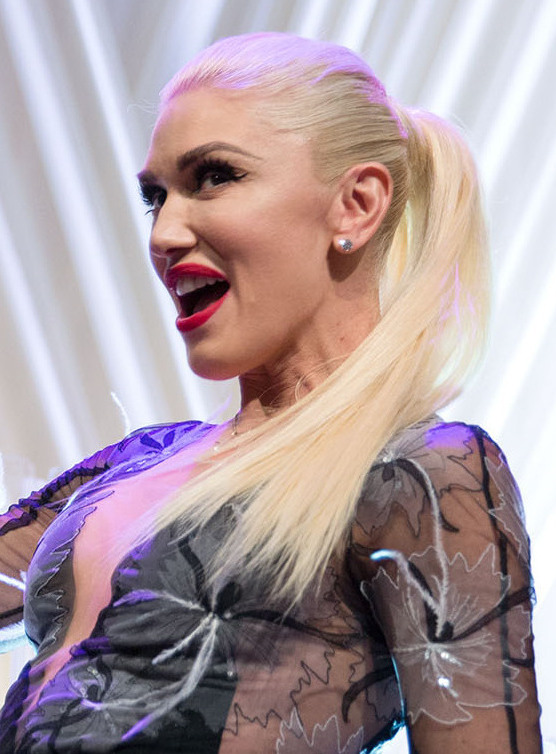
Gwen Stefani (7, 9, 12, 17, 19, 22, 24, 26)

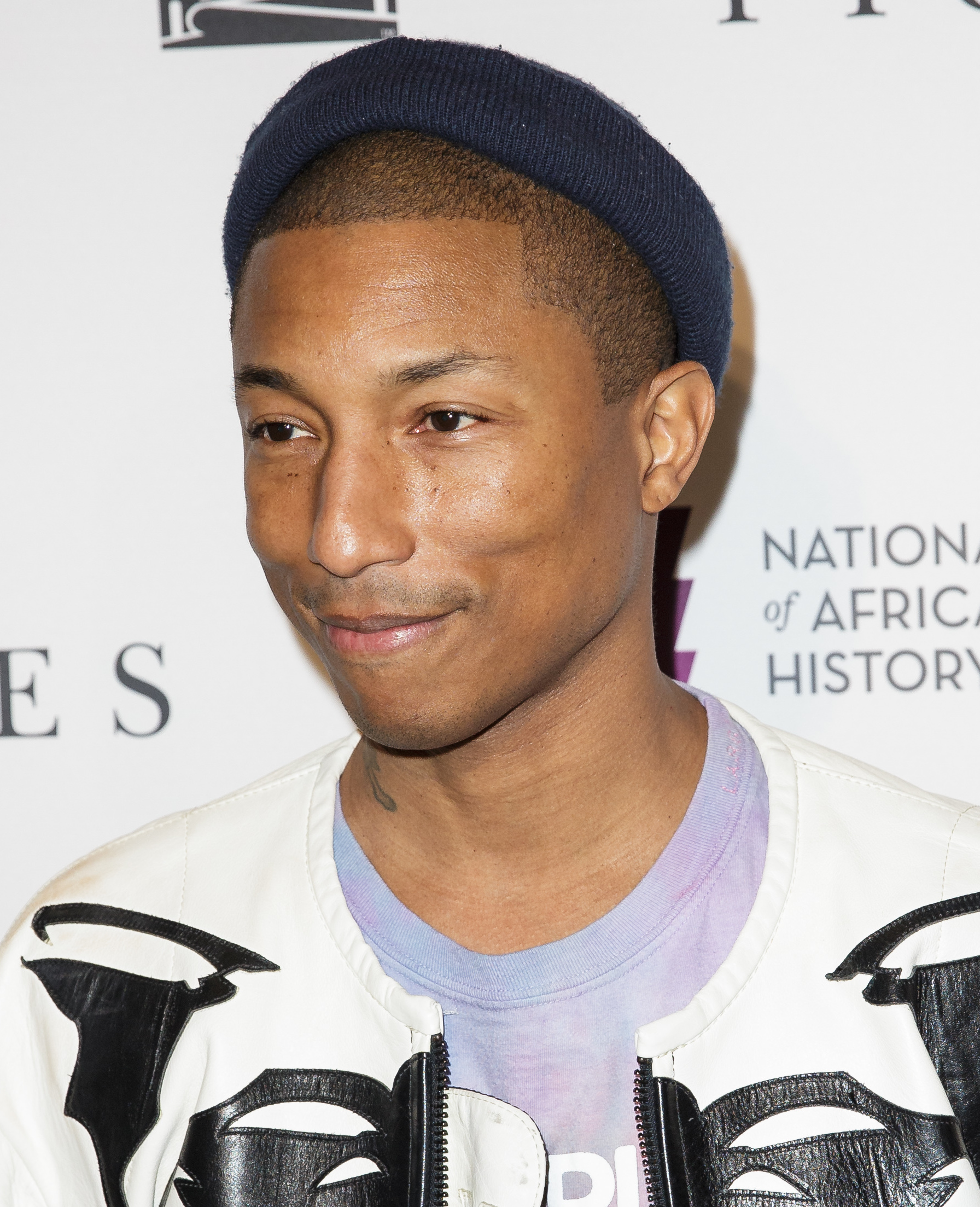
Pharrell Williams (7–10)

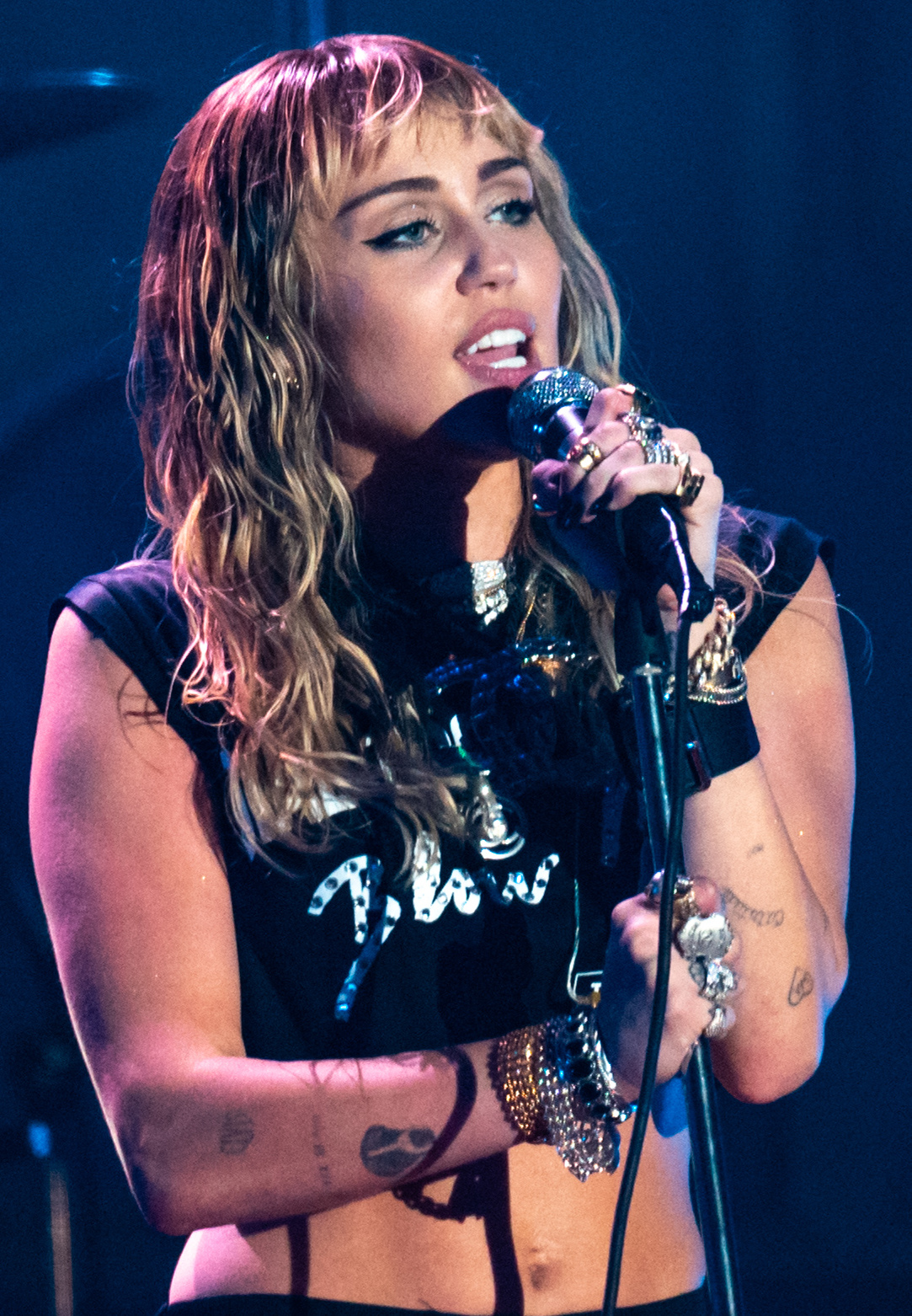
Miley Cyrus (11, 13)

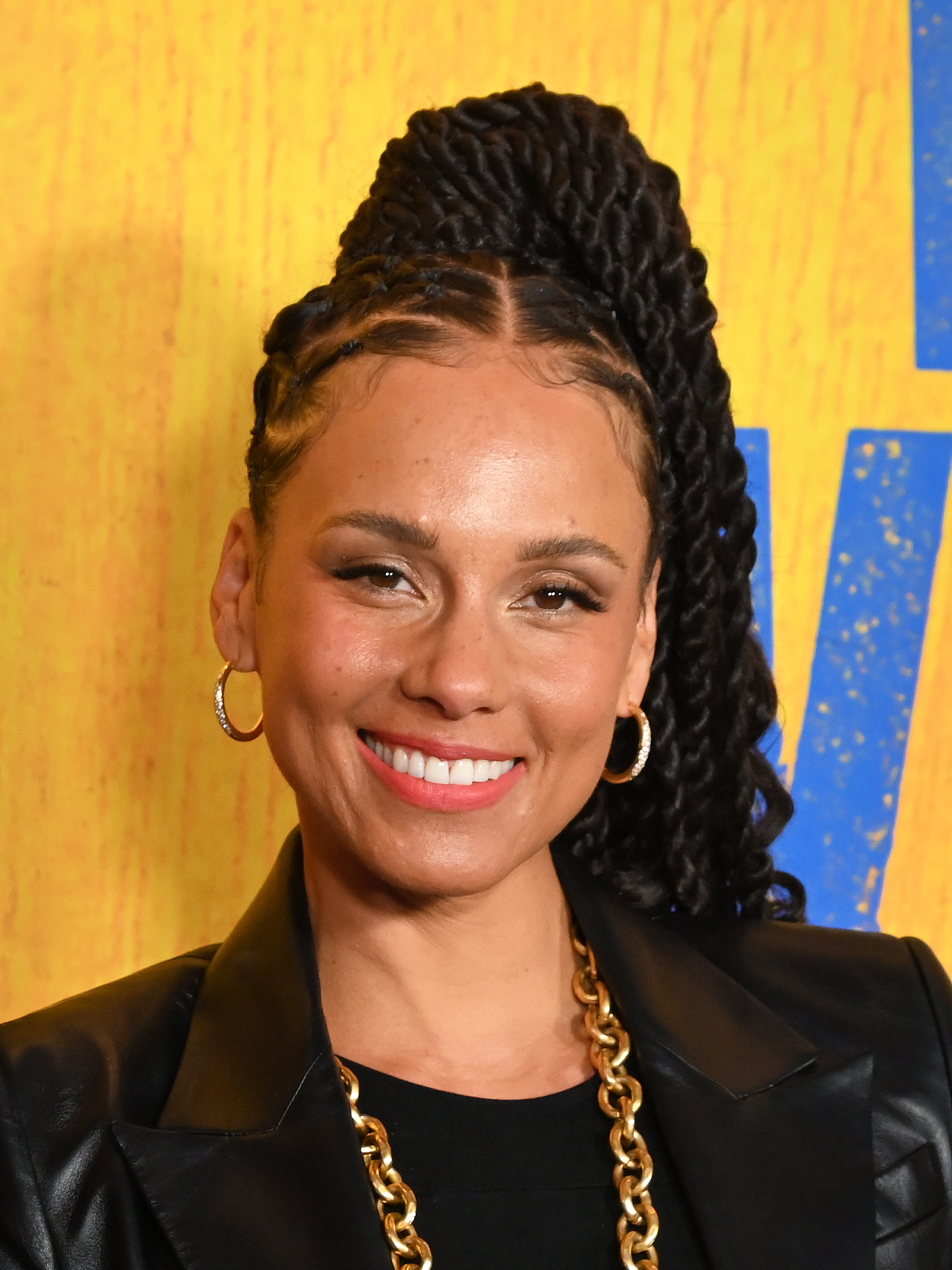
Alicia Keys (11–12, 14)

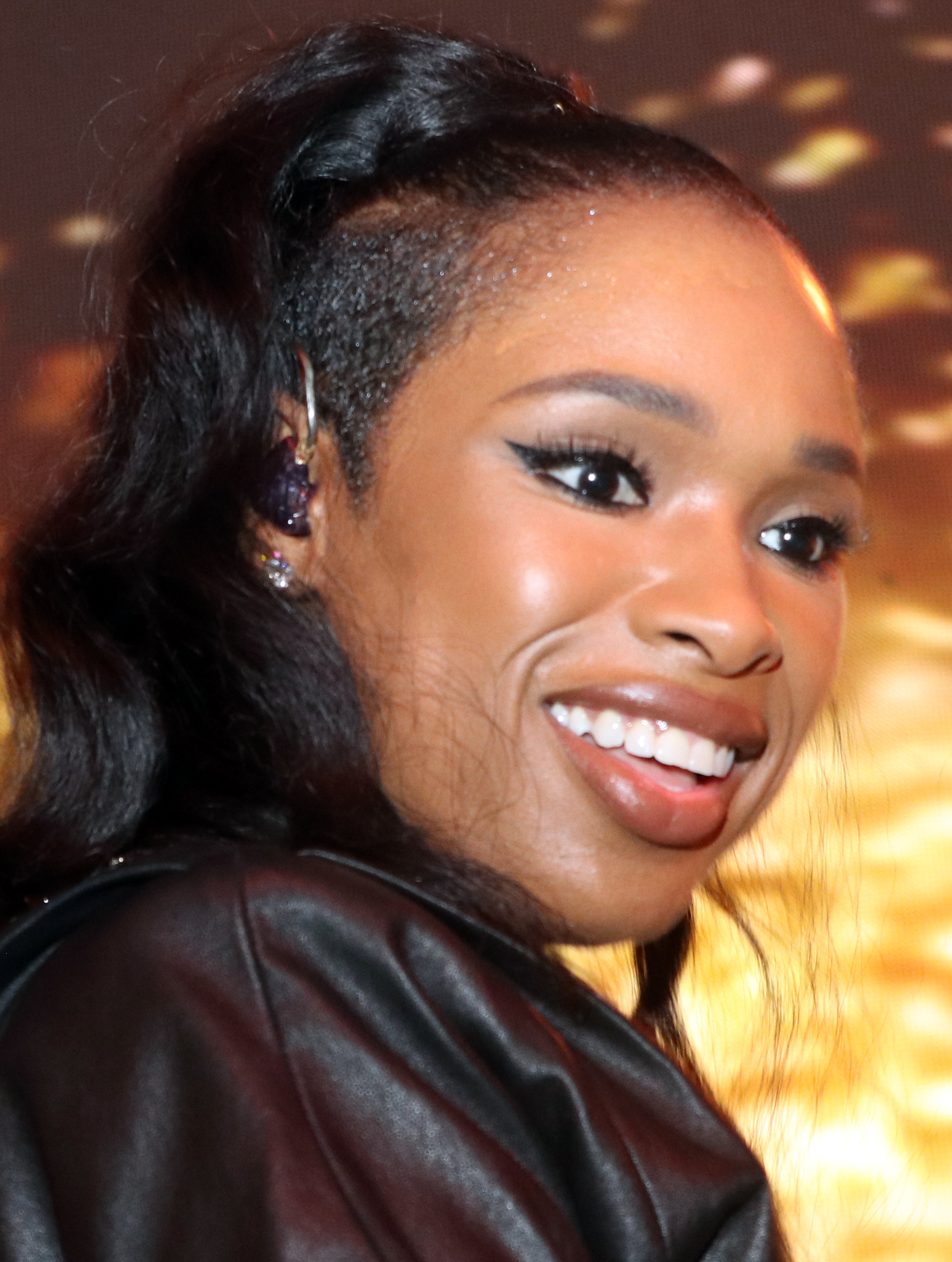
Jennifer Hudson (13, 15)

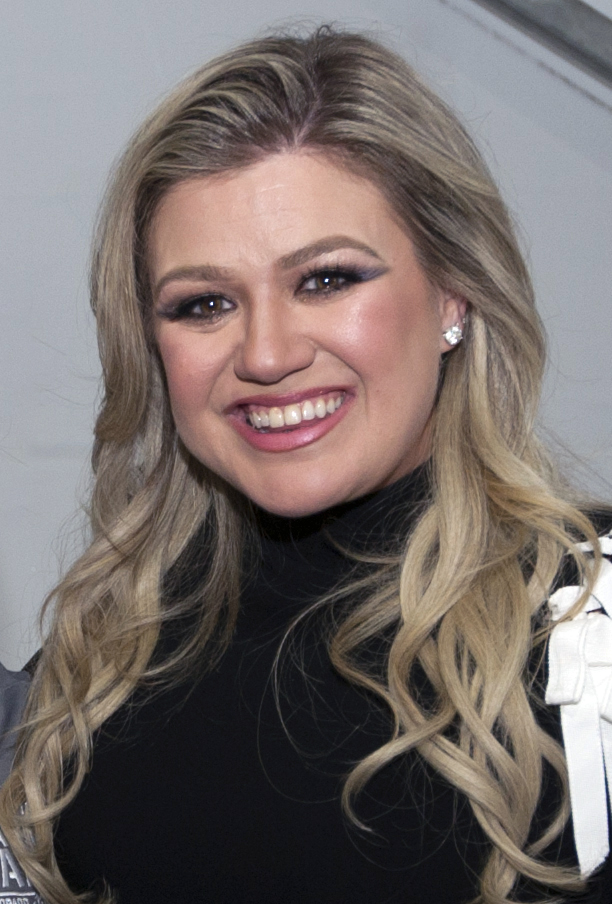
Kelly Clarkson (14–21, 23, 29–30)

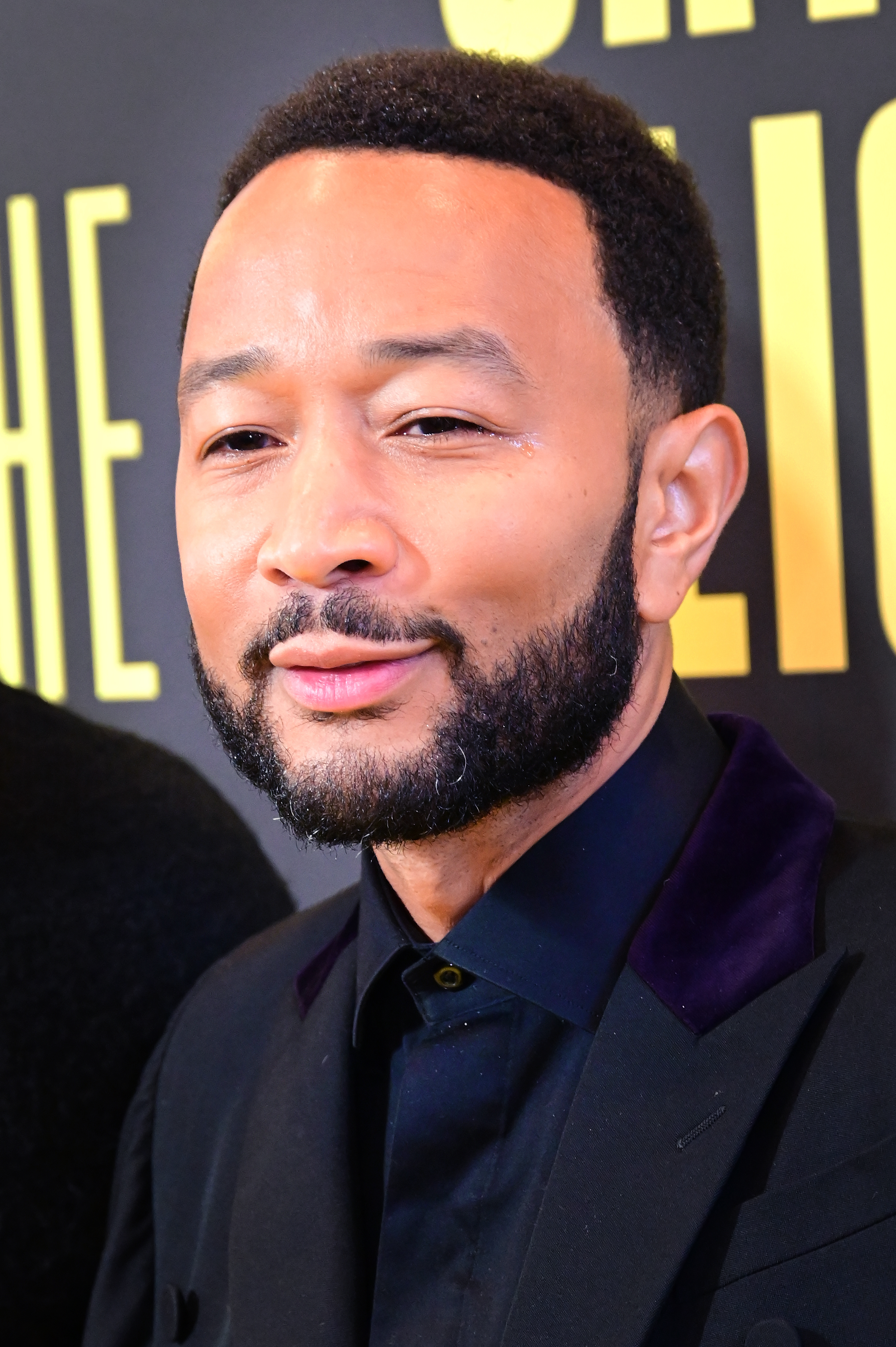
John Legend (16–22, 24–25, 27, 29)

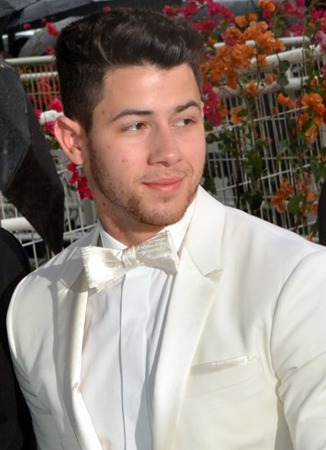
Nick Jonas (18, 20)

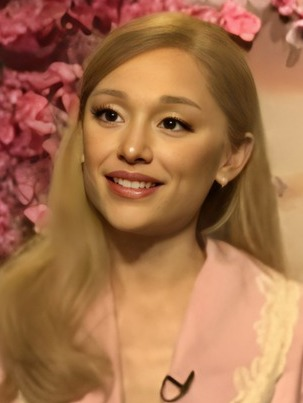
Ariana Grande (21)

Camila Cabello (22)

Chance the Rapper (23, 25)

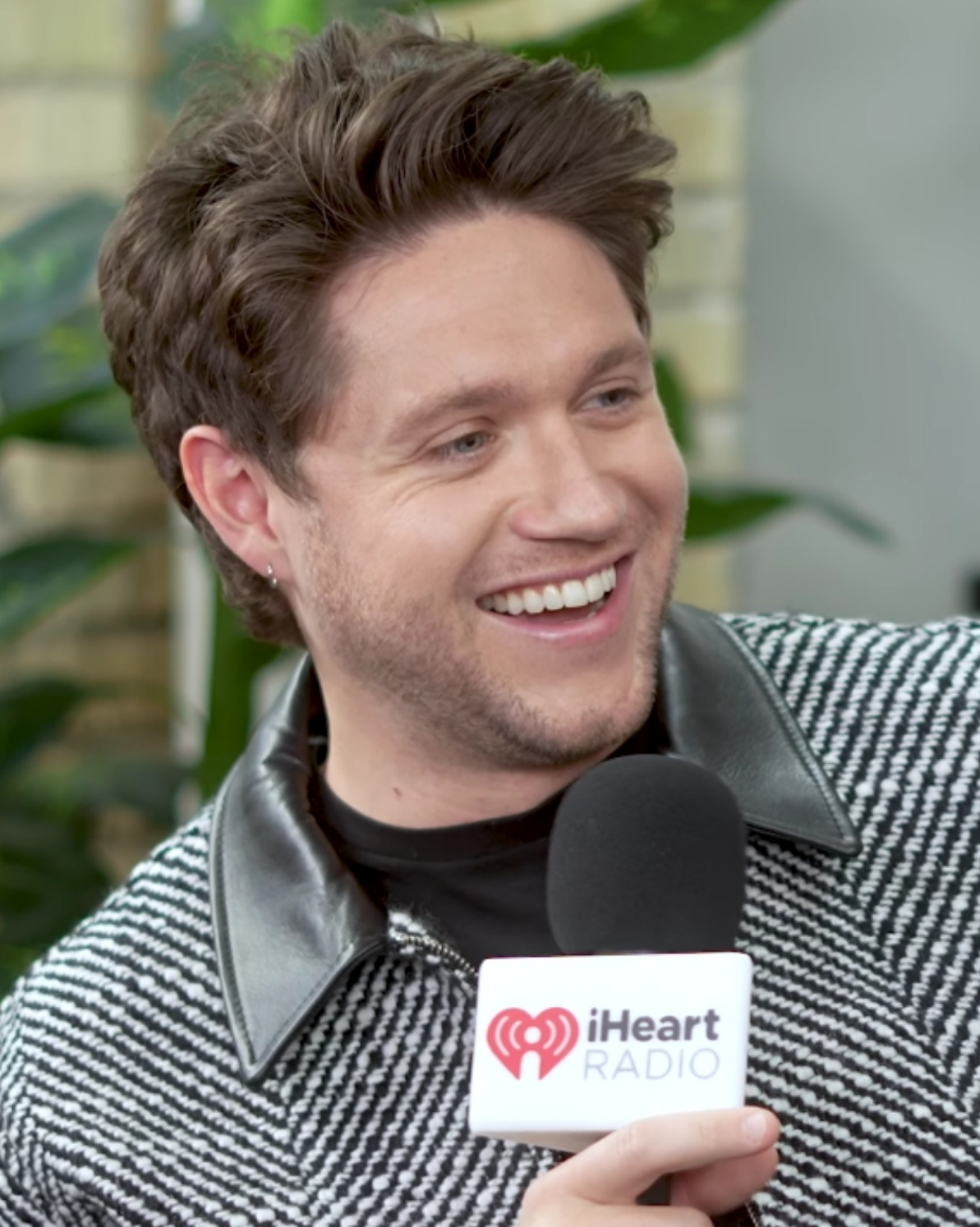
Niall Horan (23–24, 28)

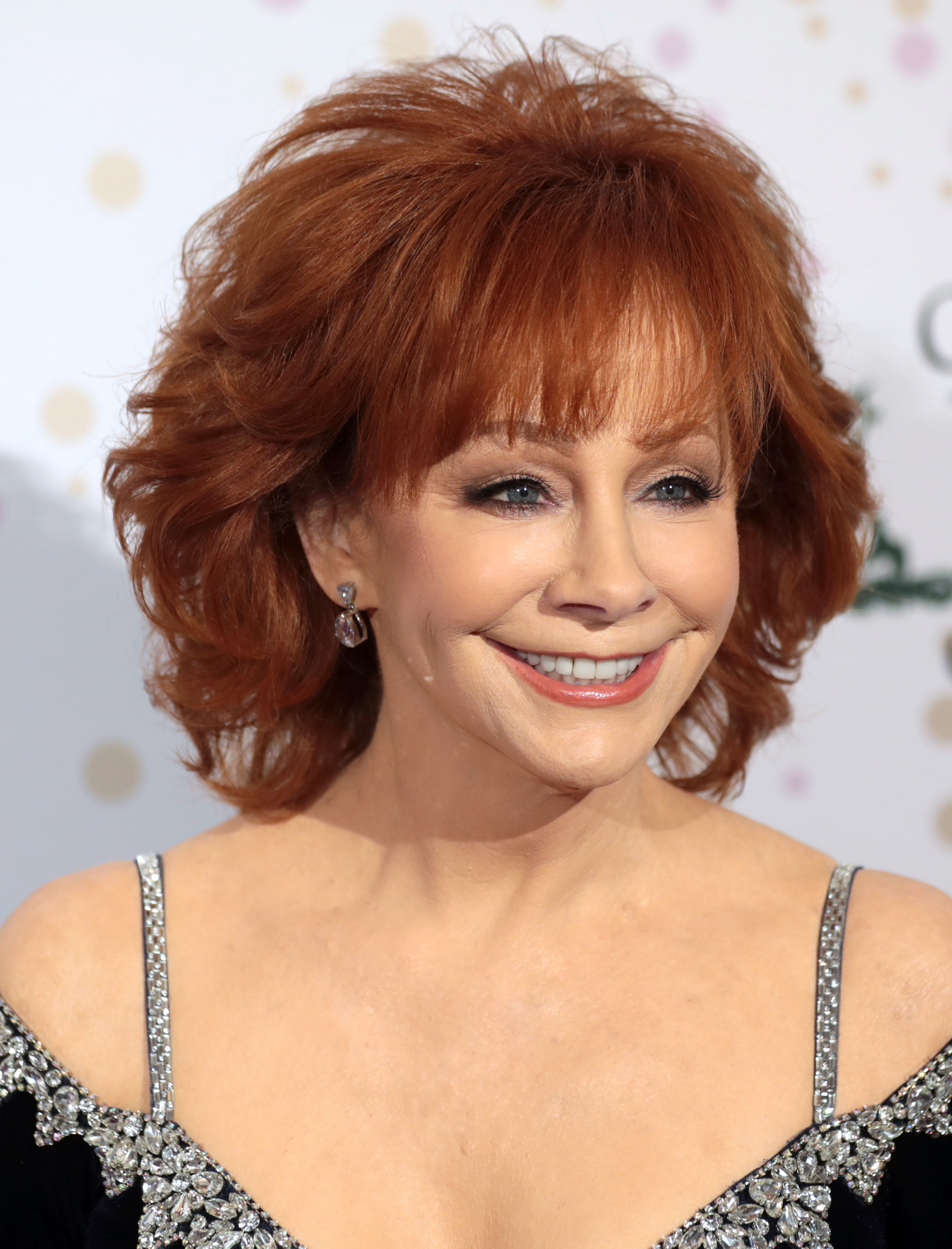
Reba McEntire (24–26, 28)

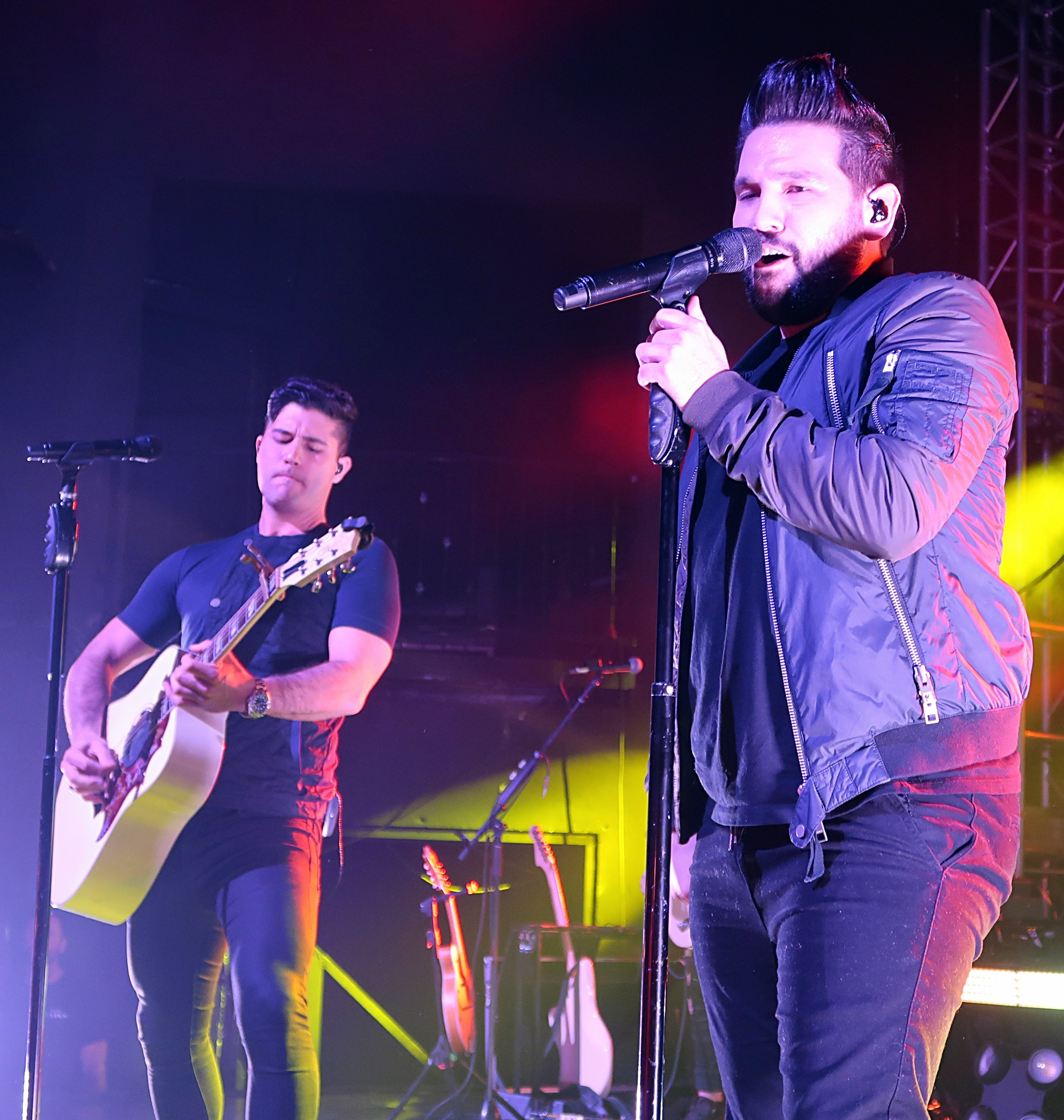
Dan + Shay (25)

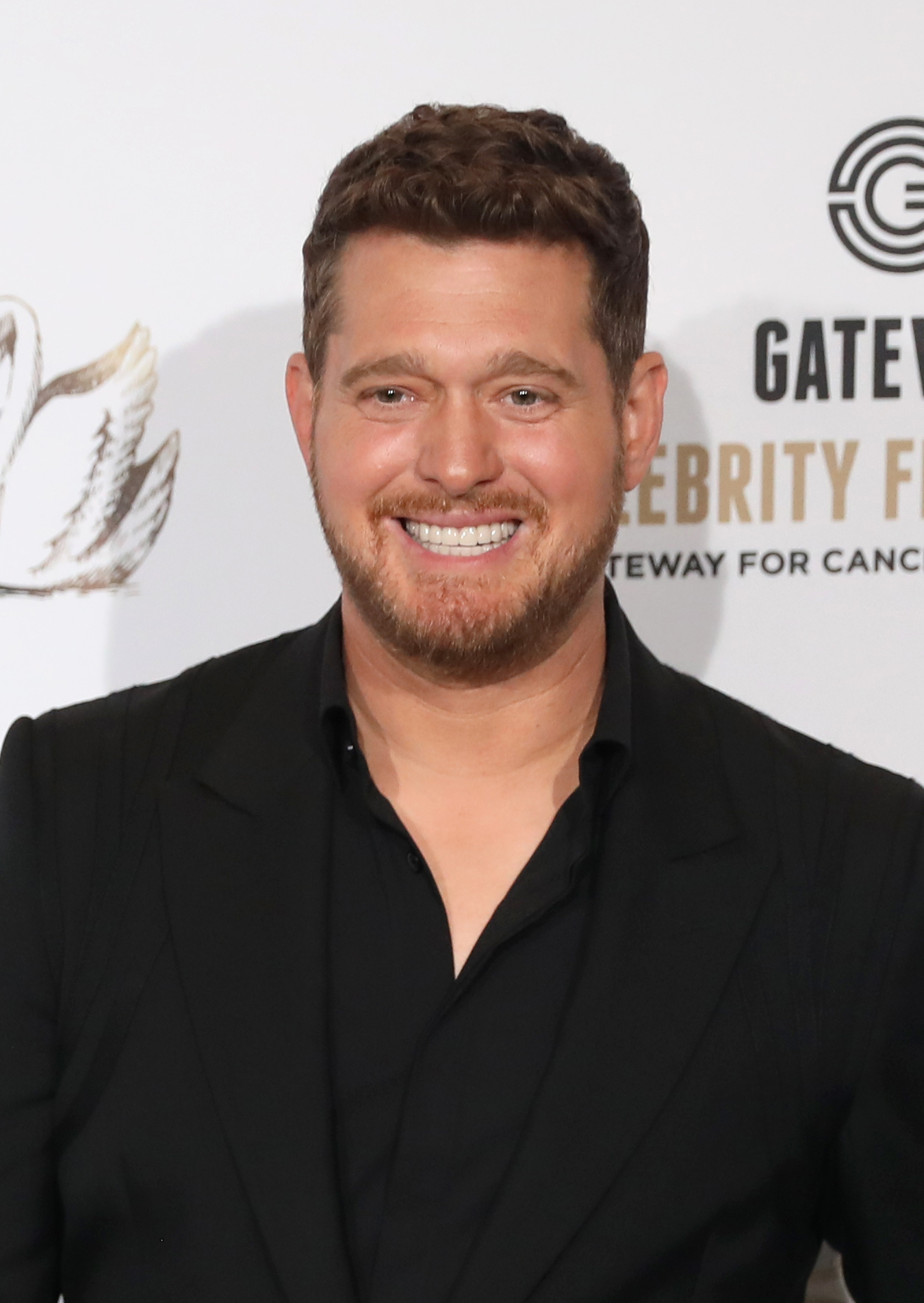
Michael Bublé (26–28)

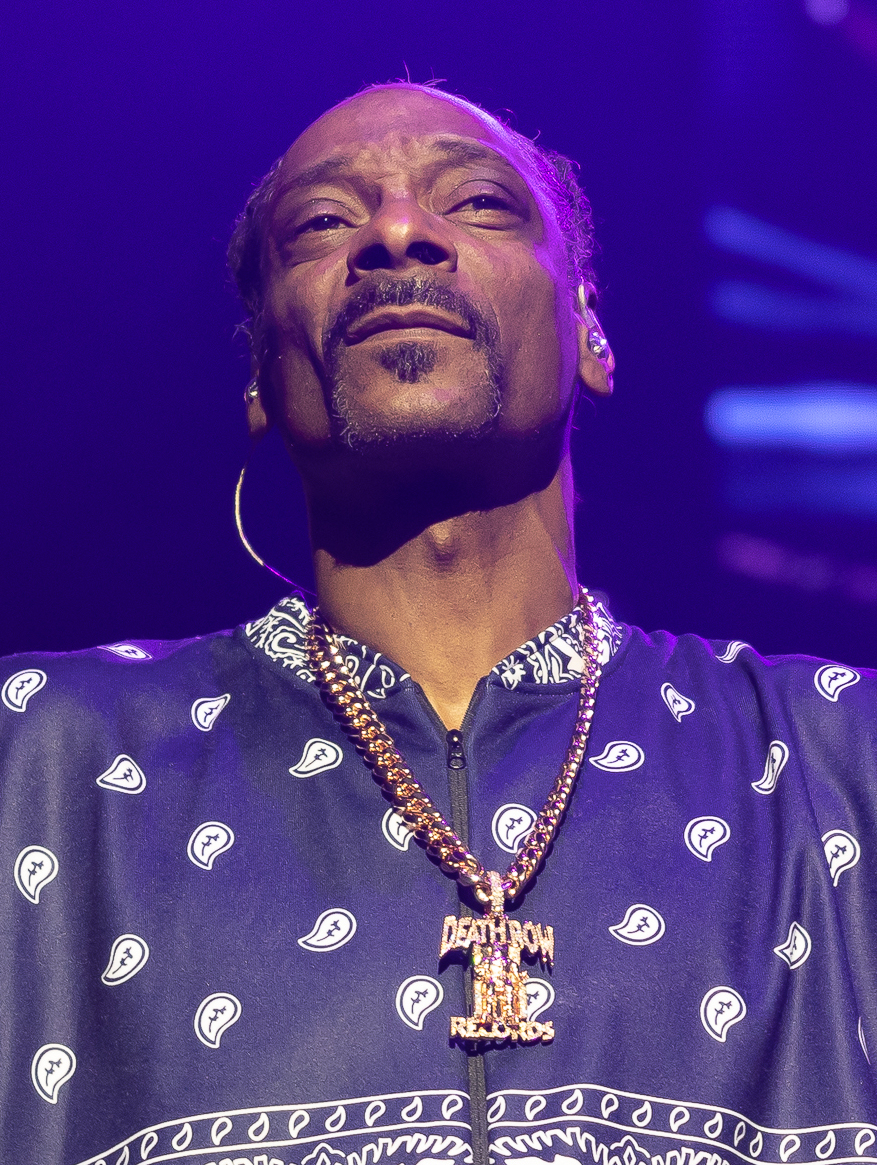
Snoop Dogg (26, 28)

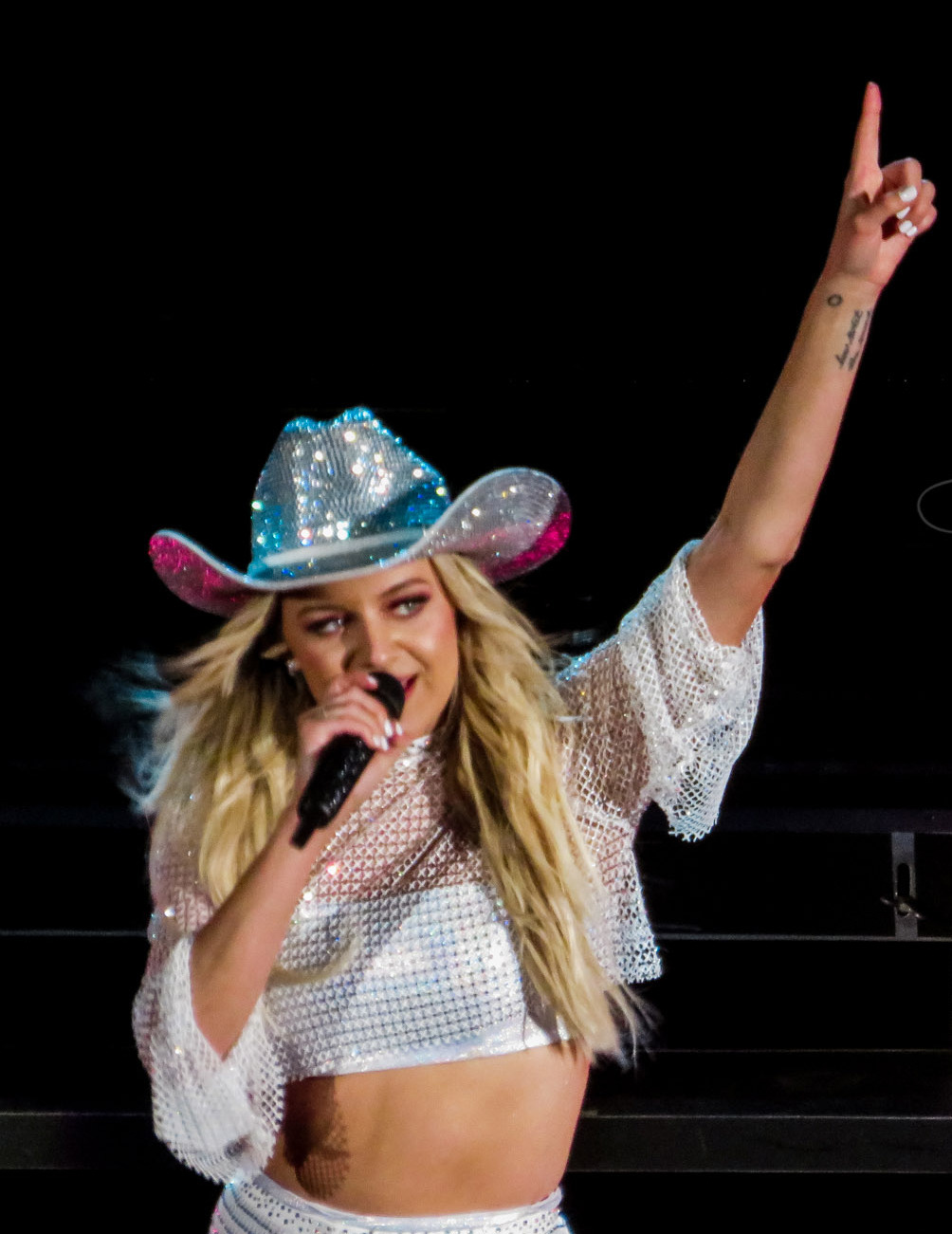
Kelsea Ballerini (27)

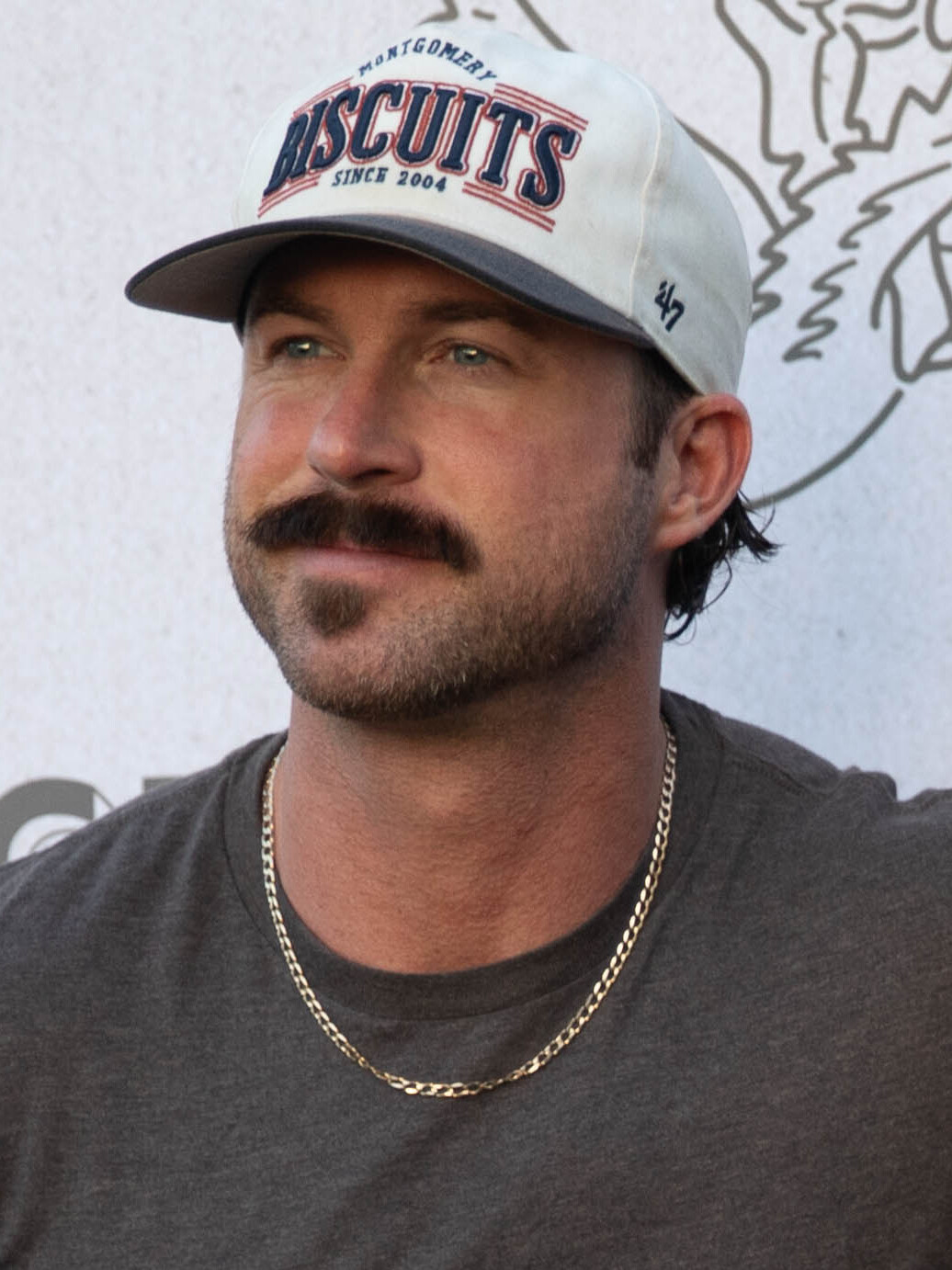
Riley Green (30–present)

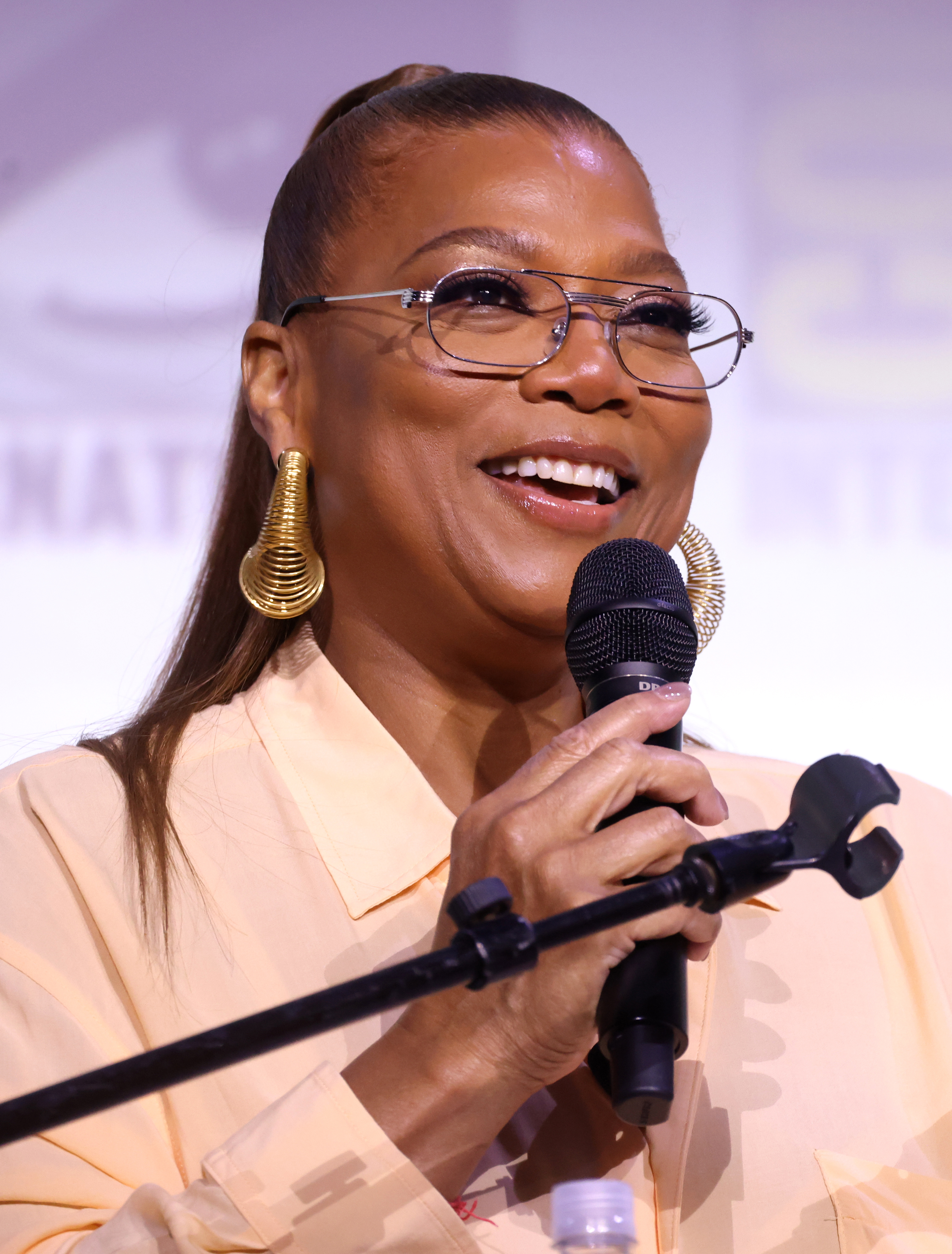
Queen Latifah (30–present)

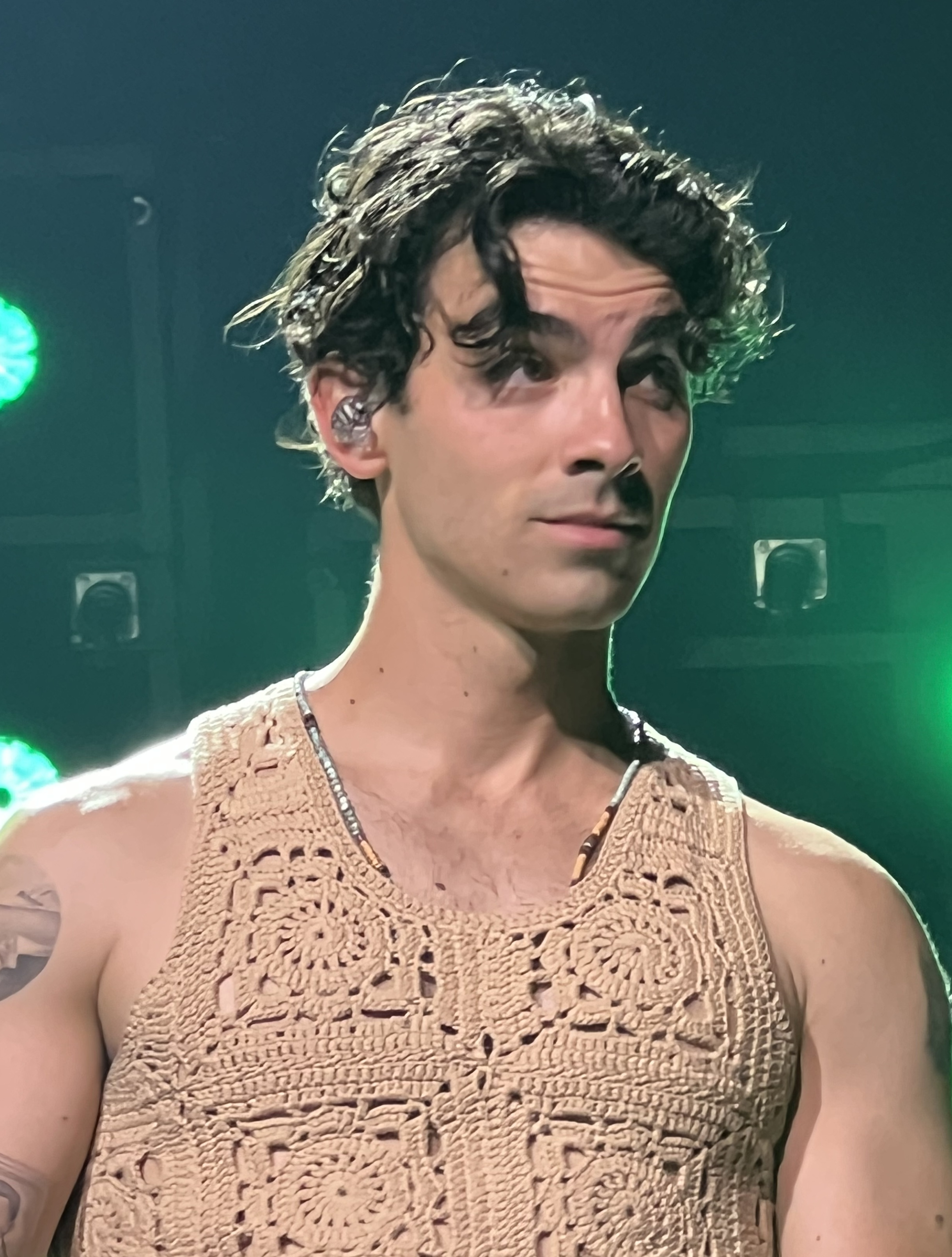
Joe Jonas (upcoming in 31)

=== Line-up of coaches ===
Coaches' line-up by chairs order
| Season | Year | Coaches | | | |
| Season | Year | 1 | 2 | 3 | 4 |
|---|---|---|---|---|---|
| 1 | 2011 | Adam | CeeLo | Christina | Blake |
| 2 | 2012 | Adam | CeeLo | Christina | Blake |
| 3 | 2012 | Adam | CeeLo | Christina | Blake |
| 4 | 2013 | Adam | Shakira | Usher | Blake |
| 5 | 2013 | Adam | CeeLo | Christina | Blake |
| 6 | 2014 | Adam | Shakira | Usher | Blake |
| 7 | 2014 | Adam | Gwen | Pharrell | Blake |
| 8 | 2015 | Adam | Pharrell | Christina | Blake |
| 9 | 2015 | Adam | Gwen | Pharrell | Blake |
| 10 | 2016 | Adam | Pharrell | Christina | Blake |
| 11 | 2016 | Adam | Miley | Alicia | Blake |
| 12 | 2017 | Adam | Gwen | Alicia | Blake |
| 13 | 2017 | Adam | Miley | Jennifer | Blake |
| 14 | 2018 | Adam | Alicia | Kelly | Blake |
| 15 | 2018 | Adam | Kelly | Jennifer | Blake |
| 16 | 2019 | Adam | John | Kelly | Blake |
| 17 | 2019 | Kelly | Gwen | John | Blake |
| 18 | 2020 | Kelly | Nick | John | Blake |
| 19 | 2020 | Kelly | Gwen | John | Blake |
| 20 | 2021 | Kelly | John | Nick | Blake |
| 21 | 2021 | Kelly | John | Ariana | Blake |
| 22 | 2022 | John | Gwen | Camila | Blake |
| 23 | 2023 | Kelly | Chance | Niall | Blake |
| 24 | 2023 | John | Gwen | Niall | Reba |
| 25 | 2024 | John | Dan + Shay | Chance | Reba |
| 26 | 2024 | Michael | Gwen | Reba | Snoop |
| 27 | 2025 | John | Michael | Kelsea | Adam |
| 28 | 2025 | Michael | Reba | Niall | Snoop |
| 29 | 2026 | John | Kelly | Adam | —N/a |
| 30 | 2026 | Kelly | Riley | Queen | Adam |
| 31 | 2027 | Riley | Queen | Joe | —N/a |

=== Timeline ===
Color key
| Featured as a full-time coach. |
| Featured as a part-time coach. |
| Featured as a part-time advisor. |

The Voice coaches
| Coach | Seasons | | | | | | | | | | | | | | | | | | | | | | | | | | | | | | |
| Coach | 1 | 2 | 3 | 4 | 5 | 6 | 7 | 8 | 9 | 10 | 11 | 12 | 13 | 14 | 15 | 16 | 17 | 18 | 19 | 20 | 21 | 22 | 23 | 24 | 25 | 26 | 27 | 28 | 29 | 30 | 31 |
|---|---|---|---|---|---|---|---|---|---|---|---|---|---|---|---|---|---|---|---|---|---|---|---|---|---|---|---|---|---|---|---|
| Adam Levine | | | | | | | | | | | | | | | | | | | | | | | | | | | | | | | |
| CeeLo Green | | | | | | | | | | | | | | | | | | | | | | | | | | | | | | | |
| Christina Aguilera | | | | | | | | | | | | | | | | | | | | | | | | | | | | | | | |
| Blake Shelton | | | | | | | | | | | | | | | | | | | | | | | | | | | | | | | |
| Shakira | | | | | | | | | | | | | | | | | | | | | | | | | | | | | | | |
| Usher | | | | | | | | | | | | | | | | | | | | | | | | | | | | | | | |
| Gwen Stefani | | | | | | | | | | | | | | | | | | | | | | | | | | | | | | | |
| Pharrell Williams | | | | | | | | | | | | | | | | | | | | | | | | | | | | | | | |
| Miley Cyrus | | | | | | | | | | | | | | | | | | | | | | | | | | | | | | | |
| Alicia Keys | | | | | | | | | | | | | | | | | | | | | | | | | | | | | | | |
| Jennifer Hudson | | | | | | | | | | | | | | | | | | | | | | | | | | | | | | | |
| Kelly Clarkson | | | | | | | | | | | | | | | | | | | | | | | | | | | | | | | |
| John Legend | | | | | | | | | | | | | | | | | | | | | | | | | | | | | | | |
| Nick Jonas | | | | | | | | | | | | | | | | | | | | | | | | | | | | | | | |
| Ariana Grande | | | | | | | | | | | | | | | | | | | | | | | | | | | | | | | |
| Camila Cabello | | | | | | | | | | | | | | | | | | | | | | | | | | | | | | | |
| Chance the Rapper | | | | | | | | | | | | | | | | | | | | | | | | | | | | | | | |
| Niall Horan | | | | | | | | | | | | | | | | | | | | | | | | | | | | | | | |
| Reba McEntire | | | | | | | | | | | | | | | | | | | | | | | | | | | | | | | |
| Dan + Shay | | | | | | | | | | | | | | | | | | | | | | | | | | | | | | | |
| Michael Bublé | | | | | | | | | | | | | | | | | | | | | | | | | | | | | | | |
| Snoop Dogg | | | | | | | | | | | | | | | | | | | | | | | | | | | | | | | |
| Kelsea Ballerini | | | | | | | | | | | | | | | | | | | | | | | | | | | | | | | |
| Riley Green | | | | | | | | | | | | | | | | | | | | | | | | | | | | | | | |
| Queen Latifah | | | | | | | | | | | | | | | | | | | | | | | | | | | | | | | |
| Joe Jonas | | | | | | | | | | | | | | | | | | | | | | | | | | | | | | | |

=== Hosts ===
Carson Daly hosted the series from the inaugural season to its thirtieth season. Alison Haislip served as the original "backstage, online, and social media correspondent," and she was replaced by Christina Milian. Milian did not return for season five, at which point Daly assumed the duties as the social media correspondent. In season 29, Druski joined the series as the first ever commentator. Keke Palmer will replace Daly as the new host of the show for the thirty-first season.

==== Gallery ====
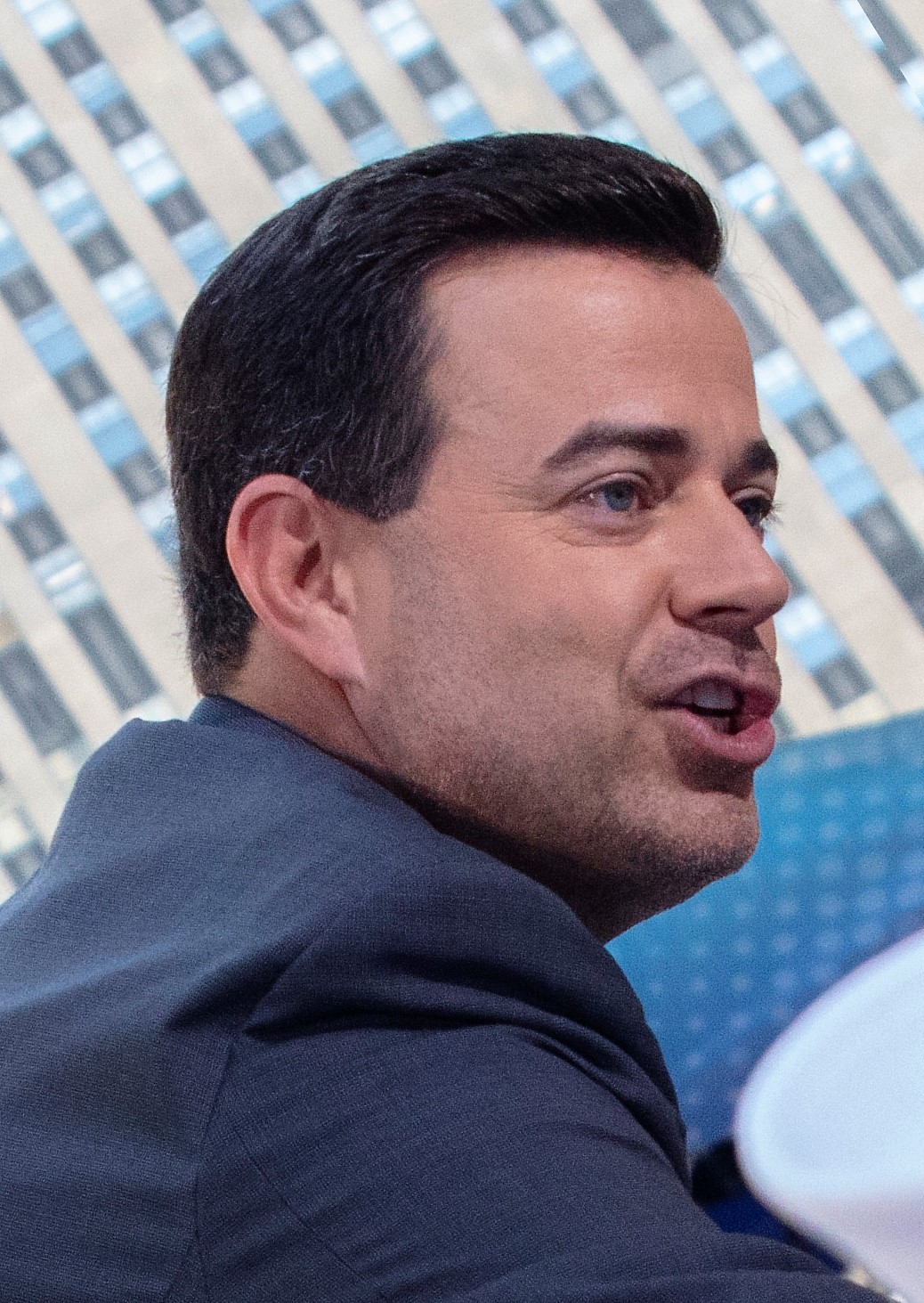
Carson Daly (1–30)

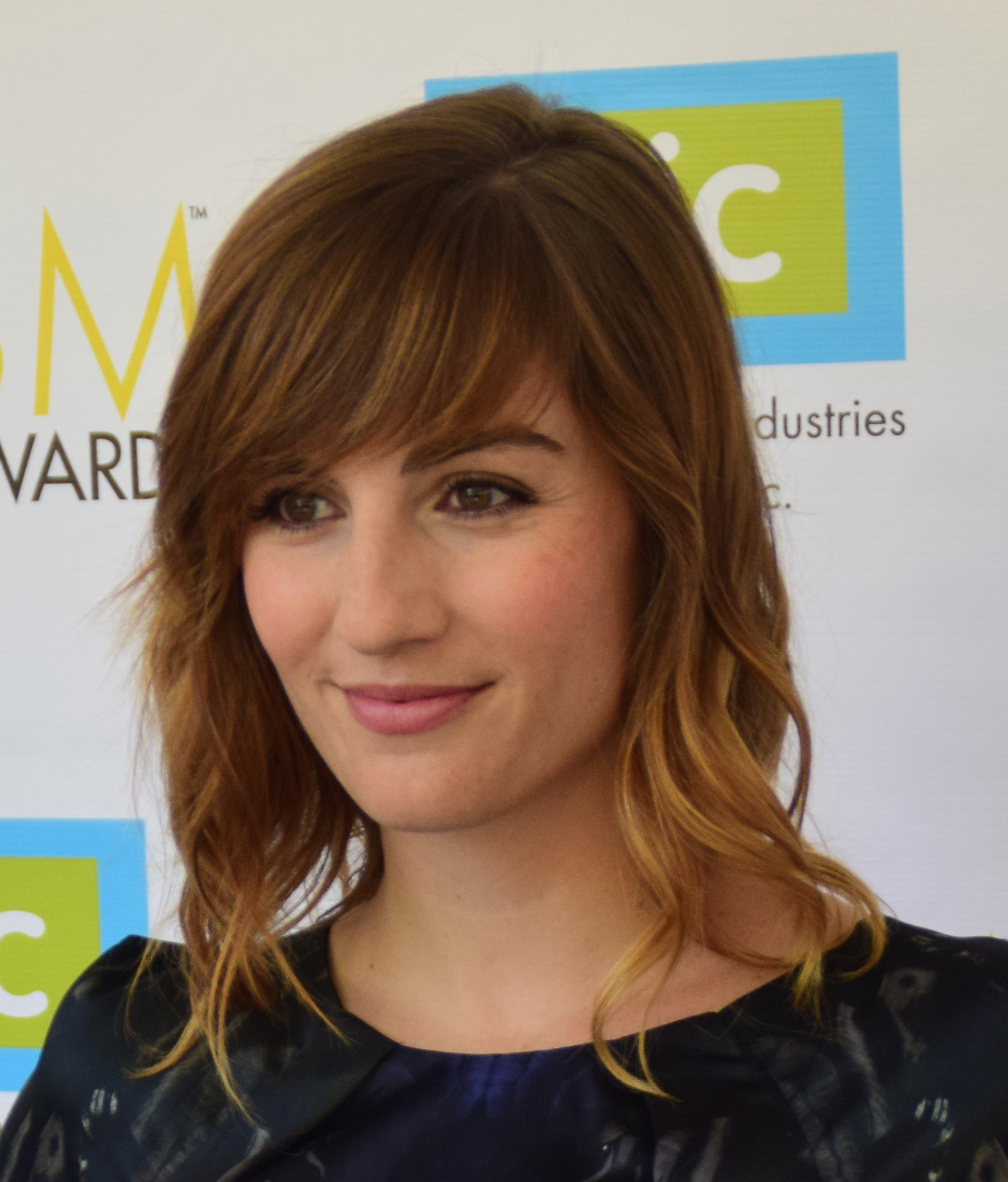
Alison Haislip (1)

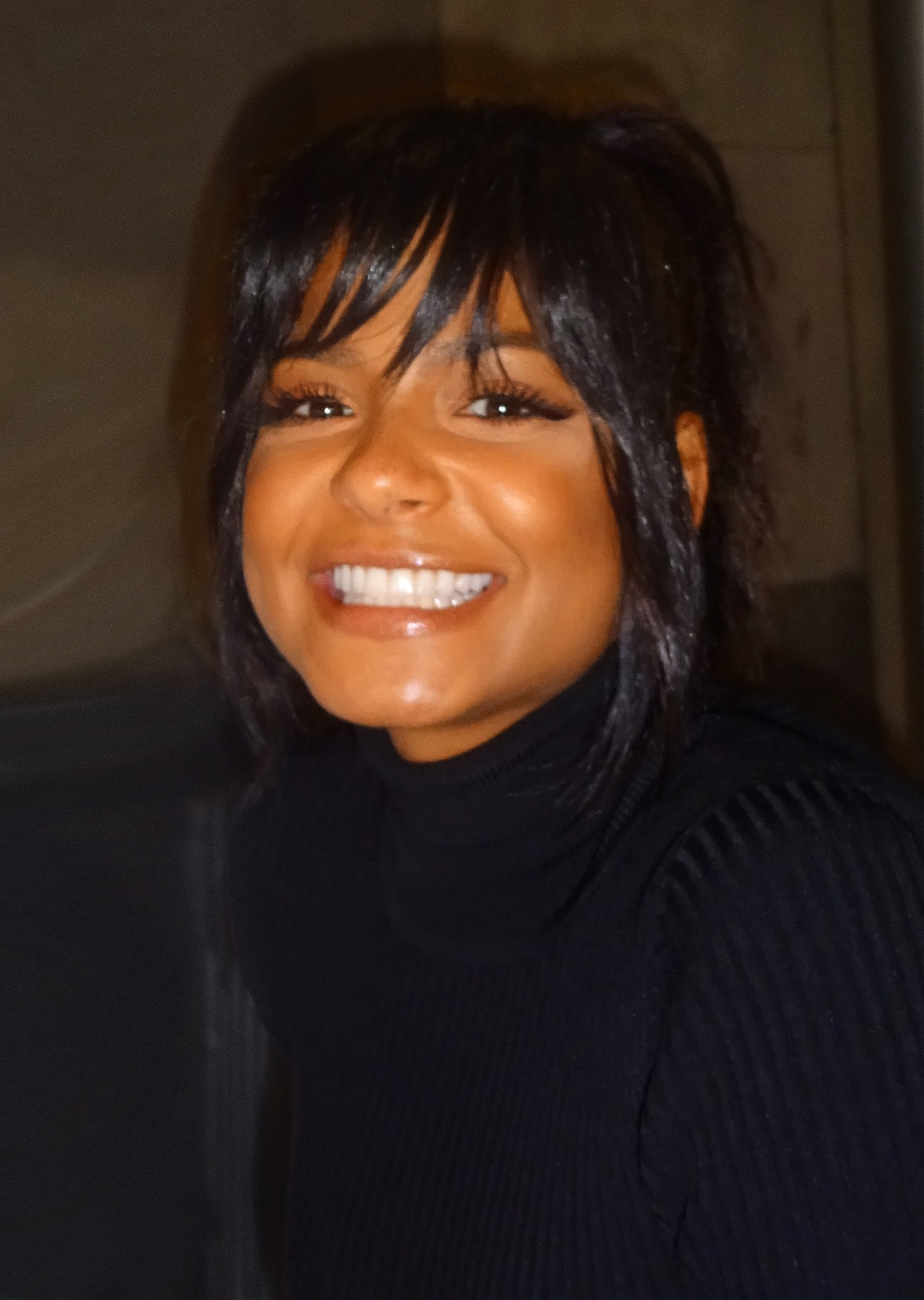
Christina Milian (2–4)

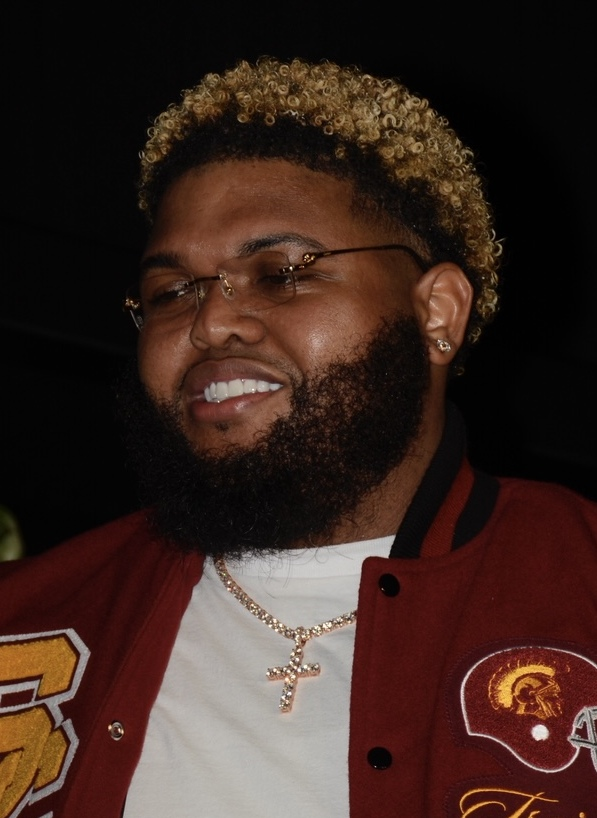
Druski (29)

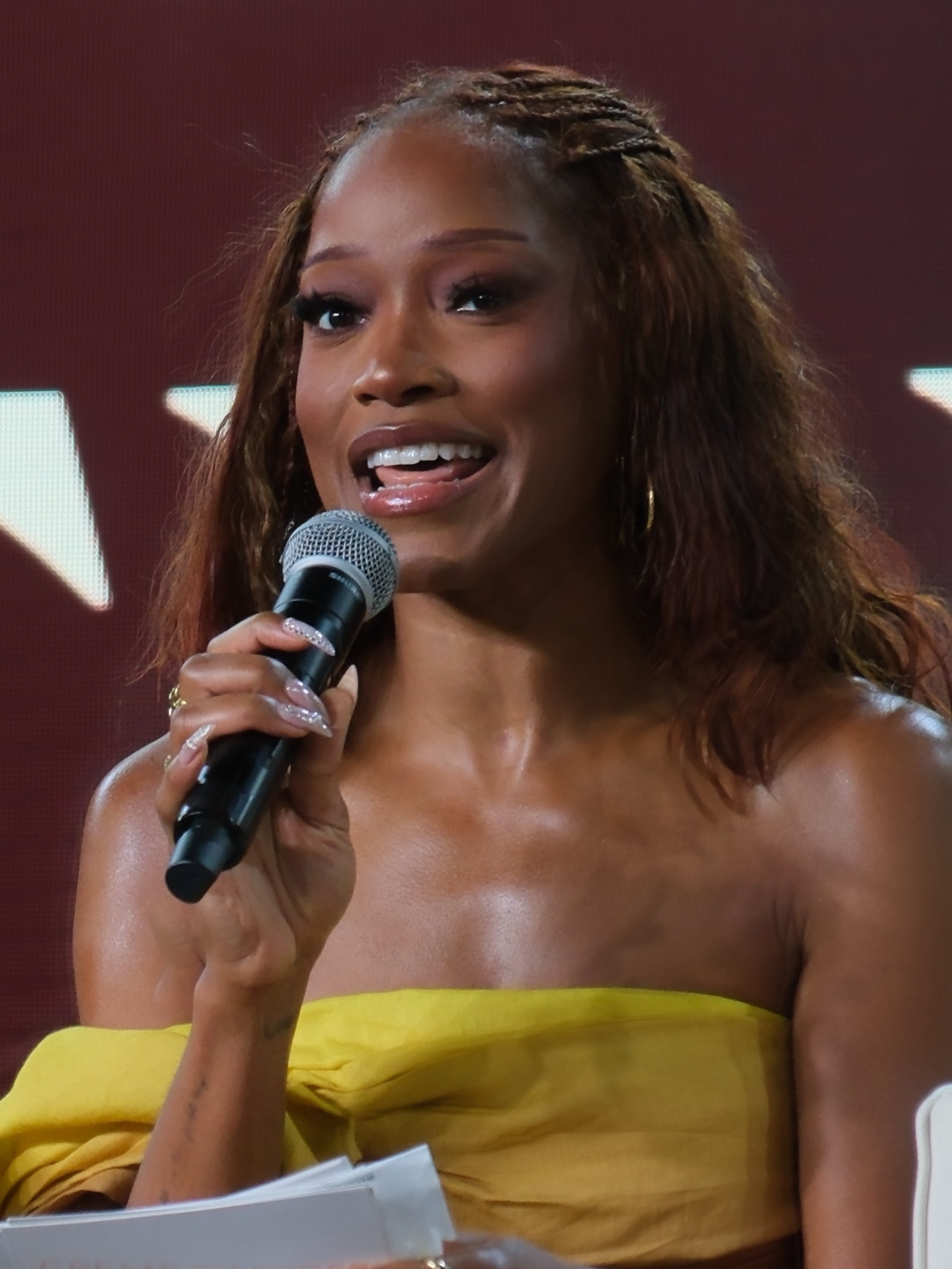
Keke Palmer (upcoming in 31)

==== Timeline ====
Color key
| Featured as a full-time host. |
| Featured as a social media correspondent. |
| Featured as a commentator. |

The Voice hosts
| Host | Seasons | | | | | | | | | | | | | | | | | | | | | | | | | | | | | | |
| Host | 1 | 2 | 3 | 4 | 5 | 6 | 7 | 8 | 9 | 10 | 11 | 12 | 13 | 14 | 15 | 16 | 17 | 18 | 19 | 20 | 21 | 22 | 23 | 24 | 25 | 26 | 27 | 28 | 29 | 30 | 31 |
|---|---|---|---|---|---|---|---|---|---|---|---|---|---|---|---|---|---|---|---|---|---|---|---|---|---|---|---|---|---|---|---|
| Carson Daly | | | | | | | | | | | | | | | | | | | | | | | | | | | | | | | |
| Alison Haislip | | | | | | | | | | | | | | | | | | | | | | | | | | | | | | | |
| Christina Milian | | | | | | | | | | | | | | | | | | | | | | | | | | | | | | | |
| Druski | | | | | | | | | | | | | | | | | | | | | | | | | | | | | | | |
| Keke Palmer | | | | | | | | | | | | | | | | | | | | | | | | | | | | | | | |

== Coaches' advisors ==
Battles/Playoffs round advisors are listed first; additional advisors and their roles are denoted by superscripts.

The Voice coaches advisors
| Season | Team Adam | Team CeeLo | Team Christina | Team Blake | All coaches |
|---|---|---|---|---|---|
| 1 | Adam Blackstone | Monica | Sia | Reba McEntire | —N/a |
| 2 | Alanis Morissette; Robin Thicke | Babyface; Ne-Yo | Jewel; Lionel Richie | Kelly Clarkson; Miranda Lambert | —N/a |
| 3 | Mary J. Blige | Rob Thomas; Jennifer Hudson^{a} Bill Withers^{b} Pat Monahan^{c} | Billie Joe Armstrong; Ron Fair^{a} | Michael Bublé; Scott Hendricks^{a} | —N/a |
| 4 | Team Adam | Team Shakira | Team Usher | Team Blake | —N/a |
| 4 | Hillary Scott^{d} | Joel Madden; CeeLo Green^{d} | Pharrell Williams^{d} Aakomon Jones^{e} Taylor Swift^{f} | Sheryl Crow^{d} | —N/a |
| 5 | Team Adam | Team CeeLo | Team Christina | Team Blake | —N/a |
| 5 | Ryan Tedder | Miguel | Ed Sheeran | Cher | —N/a |
| 6 | Team Adam | Team Shakira | Team Usher | Team Blake | All coaches |
| 6 | Aloe Blacc; Graham Nash^{h} James Valentine^{i} | Miranda Lambert busbee^{h} | Jill Scott; Natural^{h} | The Band Perry; Scott Hendricks^{h} Gwen Sebastian^{i} | Chris Martin^{g} |
| 7 | Team Adam | Team Gwen | Team Pharrell | Team Blake | All coaches |
| 7 | Stevie Nicks; Patrick Stump^{k} | Gavin Rossdale; Christina Aguilera^{k} | Alicia Keys; Diana Ross^{k} | Little Big Town; Colbie Caillat^{k} | Taylor Swift^{j} |
| 8 | Team Adam | Team Pharrell | Team Christina | Team Blake | All coaches |
| 8 | Ellie Goulding; Dave Stewart^{m} Usher^{n} | Lionel Richie; Ryan Tedder^{m} Gwen Stefani^{n} | Nick Jonas; Mark Ronson^{m} Gwen Stefani^{n} | Meghan Trainor; Scott Hendricks^{m} CeeLo Green^{n} | Nate Ruess; Reba McEntire^{l} |
| 9 | Team Adam | Team Gwen | Team Pharrell | Team Blake | All coaches |
| 9 | John Fogerty | Selena Gomez | Missy Elliott | Brad Paisley | Rihanna; Dolly Parton^{o} |
| 10 | Team Adam | Team Pharrell | Team Christina | Team Blake | All coaches |
| 10 | Tori Kelly | Sean Combs | Patti LaBelle | Gwen Stefani | Miley Cyrus; Pink^{p} |
| 11 | Team Adam | Team Miley | Team Alicia | Team Blake | All coaches |
| 11 | Sammy Hagar | Joan Jett | Charlie Puth | Bette Midler | Tim McGraw; Faith Hill; Garth Brooks^{q} |
| 12 | Team Adam | Team Gwen | Team Alicia | Team Blake | All coaches |
| 12 | John Legend | Celine Dion | DJ Khaled | Luke Bryan | Shania Twain |
| 13 | Team Adam | Team Miley | Team Jennifer | Team Blake | All coaches |
| 13 | Joe Jonas | Billy Ray Cyrus | Kelly Rowland | Rascal Flatts | Kelly Clarkson |
| 14 | Team Adam | Team Alicia | Team Kelly | Team Blake | All coaches |
| 14 | Julia Michaels; Jordan Smith^{r} | Shawn Mendes; Chris Blue^{r} | Hailee Steinfeld; Cassadee Pope^{r} | Trace Adkins; Chloe Kohanski^{r} | —N/a |
| 15 | Team Adam | Team Kelly | Team Jennifer | Team Blake | All coaches |
| 15 | CeeLo Green | Thomas Rhett; Brynn Cartelli^{s} | Halsey | Keith Urban | Mariah Carey |
| 16 | Team Adam | Team Legend | Team Kelly | Team Blake | All coaches |
| 16 | Charlie Puth | Khalid | Kelsea Ballerini | Brooks & Dunn | —N/a |
| 17 | Team Kelly | Team Gwen | Team Legend | Team Blake | All coaches |
| 17 | Normani | will.i.am | Usher | Darius Rucker | Taylor Swift |
| 18 | Team Kelly | Team Nick | Team Legend | Team Blake | All coaches |
| 18 | Dua Lipa | Joe Jonas and Kevin Jonas | Ella Mai | Bebe Rexha | James Taylor |
| 19 | Team Kelly | Team Gwen | Team Legend | Team Blake | All coaches |
| 19 | Leon Bridges | Julia Michaels | Miguel | Kane Brown | Usher |
| 20 | Team Kelly | Team Legend | Team Nick | Team Blake | All coaches |
| 20 | Kelsea Ballerini^{t} Luis Fonsi | Brandy | Darren Criss | Dan + Shay | Snoop Dogg |
| 21 | Team Kelly | Team Legend | Team Ariana | Team Blake | All coaches |
| 21 | Jason Aldean | Camila Cabello | Kristin Chenoweth | Dierks Bentley | Ed Sheeran |
| 22 | Team Legend | Team Gwen | Team Camila | Team Blake | All coaches |
| 22 | Jazmine Sullivan | Sean Paul | Charlie Puth | Jimmie Allen | —N/a |
| 23 | Team Kelly | Team Chance | Team Niall | Team Blake | All coaches |
| 23 | —N/a | | | | Reba McEntire |
| 24 | Team Legend | Team Gwen | Team Niall | Team Reba | All coaches |
| 24 | —N/a | | Dan + Shay^{u} | —N/a | Wynonna Judd; Chance the Rapper^{v} |
| 25 | Team Legend | Team Dan + Shay | Team Chance | Team Reba | All coaches |
| 25 | Maluma^{w} | Saweetie^{w} | Meghan Trainor^{w} | Anthony Ramos^{w} | Keith Urban |
| 26 | Team Bublé | Team Gwen | Team Reba | Team Snoop | All coaches |
| 26 | Carly Pearce^{x} | Machine Gun Kelly^{x} | Lainey Wilson^{x} | Simone Biles^{x} | Jennifer Hudson^{y} Sting^{y} |
| 27 | Team Legend | Team Bublé | Team Kelsea | Team Adam | All coaches |
| 27 | Coco Jones | Cynthia Erivo | Little Big Town | Kate Hudson | LeAnn Rimes^{z} Sheryl Crow^{z} |
| 28 | Team Bublé | Team Reba | Team Niall | Team Snoop | All coaches |
| 28 | Kelsea Ballerini | Nick Jonas | Lewis Capaldi | Lizzo | Zac Brown^{aa} Joe Walsh^{aa} |
| 29 | Team Legend | Team Kelly | Team Adam | —N/a | All coaches |
| 29 | Muni Long | Jennifer Hudson | Benji Madden | —N/a | CeeLo Green^{ab} Michael Bublé^{ab} |
| 30 | Team Kelly | Team Riley | Team Queen | Team Adam | All coaches |
| 30 | Ariana DeBose | Carly Pearce | Patti LaBelle | Alex Warren | —N/a |
| 31 | Team Riley | Team Queen | Team Joe | —N/a | All coaches |
| 31 | Upcoming season | | | | |

Notes
^a During the week of the Top 10 performances, CeeLo Green, Christina Aguilera and Blake Shelton brought in Jennifer Hudson, Ron Fair and Scott Hendricks respectively to help them coach their teams.
^b During the week of the Top 8 performances, CeeLo Green brought in Bill Withers to help coach his contestant Nicholas David on his performance of "Lean on Me".
^c Due to being sick during the rehearsals of the Top 6 performances, CeeLo Green brought in Pat Monahan to coach his team for the week. Green did however pick the songs which his team members would sing that week and kept in touch with them by phone.
^d The mentors of the Battle Rounds reprised their roles during the week of the Top 10 performances except Joel Madden who was working on The Voice in Australia. Shakira instead brought in CeeLo Green to help coach her team that week.
^e During the week of the Top 12 performances, Usher brought in his choreographer Aakomon Jones to help coach his team.
^f During the week of the Top 6 performances, Taylor Swift attended Michelle Chamuel's rehearsal of "I Knew You Were Trouble".
^g With the replacement of the Knockout Rounds with the "Battles, Round 2" in season 6, Coldplay frontman Chris Martin served as the sole advisor for every team.
^h During the week of the Top 10 performances, all four coaches brought advisors to help coach their teams. Graham Nash helped Team Adam, busbee helped Team Shakira, Natural helped Team Usher, and Scott Hendricks helped Team Blake.
^i During the week of the Top 8 performances, Adam Levine brought in fellow band member James Valentine, and Blake Shelton brought in season two contestant Gwen Sebastian to help coach their teams.
^j With the return of the Knockout Rounds in season seven, Taylor Swift served as the sole advisor for every team.
^k During the week of the Top 10 performances, all four coaches brought advisors to help coach their teams. Fall Out Boy frontman Patrick Stump helped Team Adam, Christina Aguilera helped Team Gwen, Diana Ross helped Team Pharrell, and Colbie Caillat helped Team Blake.
^l During the week of the Top 12 performances, Reba McEntire helped all four coaches coaching the teams.
^m During the week of the Top 10 performances, all four coaches brought advisors to help coach their teams. Dave Stewart helped Team Adam, Ryan Tedder helped Team Pharrell, Mark Ronson helped Team Christina, and Scott Hendricks helped Team Blake.
^n During the week of the Top 8 performances, all four coaches brought advisors to help coach their teams. Usher helped Team Adam, Gwen Stefani helped Teams Pharrell and Christina, and CeeLo Green helped Team Blake.
^o During the week of the semi-final performances, Dolly Parton helped all four coaches coaching the teams.
^p During the week of the semi-final performances, Pink helped all four coaches coaching the teams.
^q During the week of the Top 12 performances, Garth Brooks helped all four coaches coaching the teams.
^r During the week of the Knockout rounds, all four coaches brought past winners of the show as advisors to help coach their teams. Season nine winner Jordan Smith helped Team Adam, season 12 winner Chris Blue helped Team Alicia, season three winner Cassadee Pope helped Team Kelly, and season 13 winner Chloe Kohanski helped Team Blake.
^s During the week of the semi-final performances, Kelly Clarkson brought in Brynn Cartelli to help her team in the rehearsals.
^t During the Battle rounds in Season 20, due to being sick, Kelsea Ballerini was brought in as a guest coach, filling in for Kelly Clarkson.
^u During the rehearsals for the Knockout rounds, Niall Horan, due to schedule issues, brought in country pop duo Dan + Shay to replace him and help coach his team.
^v During the week of the Top 12 performances, Chance the Rapper helped all four coaches coaching the teams.
^w During the Playoffs, John Legend, Dan + Shay, Chance the Rapper, and Reba McEntire brought in Maluma, Saweetie, Meghan Trainor, and Anthony Ramos respectively to help them coach their teams.
^x During the Playoffs, Michael Bublé, Gwen Stefani, Reba McEntire, and Snoop Dogg brought in Carly Pearce, Machine Gun Kelly, Lainey Wilson, and Simone Biles respectively to help them coach their teams.
^y During the Knockouts, Jennifer Hudson served as mega mentor for Teams Bublé and Reba and Sting served as mega mentor for Teams Gwen and Snoop.
^z During the Playoffs, LeAnn Rimes served as mega mentor for Teams Adam and Legend and Sheryl Crow served as mega mentor for Teams Bublé and Kelsea.
^aa During the Knockouts, Zac Brown served as mega mentor for Teams Bublé and Snoop and Joe Walsh served as mega mentor for Teams Niall and Reba.
^ab During the Knockouts, CeeLo Green served as mega mentor for Teams Adam and Legend and Michael Bublé served as mega mentor for Team Kelly.

== Coaches' teams ==
- These are each of the coaches teams throughout the seasons from the playoffs to the finale.
- Winning coach; winners are denoted by **boldface**.

The Voice coaches teams
| Season | Team Adam | Team CeeLo | Team Christina | Team Blake |
|---|---|---|---|---|
| 1 | **Javier Colon**; Casey Weston; Devon Barley; Jeff Jenkins | Vicci Martinez; Nakia; Curtis Grimes; The Thompson Sisters | Beverly McClellan; Frenchie Davis; Raquel Castro; Lily Elise | Dia Frampton; Xenia; Jared Blake; Patrick Thomas |
| 2 | Tony Lucca; Katrina Parker; Mathai; Pip; Karla Davis; Kim Yarbrough | Juliet Simms; Jamar Rogers; Cheesa; James Massone; Erin Martin; Tony Vincent | Chris Mann; Lindsey Pavao; Ashley de La Rosa; Jesse Campbell; Moses Stone; Sera Hill | **Jermaine Paul**; Erin Willett; RaeLynn; Jordis Unga; Charlotte Sometimes; Naia Kete |
| 3 | Amanda Brown; Melanie Martinez; Bryan Keith; Loren Allred; Joselyn Rivera | Nicholas David; Trevin Hunte; Cody Belew; MacKenzie Bourg; Diego Val | Dez Duron; Sylvia Yacoub; Adriana Louise; De'Borah; Devyn DeLoera | **Cassadee Pope**; Terry McDermott; Michaela Paige; Julio Cesar Castillo; Liz Davis |
| 4 | Team Adam | Team Shakira | Team Usher | Team Blake |
| 4 | Amber Carrington; Judith Hill; Sarah Simmons; Caroline Glaser | Sasha Allen; Kris Thomas; Garrett Gardner; Karina Iglesias | Michelle Chamuel; Josiah Hawley; VEDO; Cáthia | **Danielle Bradbery**; The Swon Brothers; Holly Tucker; Justin Rivers |
| 5 | Team Adam | Team CeeLo | Team Christina | Team Blake |
| 5 | **Tessanne Chin**; Will Champlin; James Wolpert; Grey; Preston Pohl | Caroline Pennell; Kat Robichaud; Jonny Gray; Tamara Chauniece; Amber Nicole | Jacquie Lee; Matthew Schuler; Josh Logan; Olivia Henken; Stephanie Anne Johnson | Cole Vosbury; Ray Boundreaux; Austin Jenckes; Nic Hawk; Shelbie Z |
| 6 | Team Adam | Team Shakira | Team Usher | Team Blake |
| 6 | Christina Grimmie; Kat Perkins; Delvin Choice; Jake Barker; Morgan Wallen | Kristen Merlin; Tess Boyer; Dani Moz; Deja Hall; Patrick Thomson | **Josh Kaufman**; Bria Kelly; T.J. Wilkins; Melissa Jiménez; Stevie Jo | Jake Worthington; Sisaundra Lewis; Audra McLaughlin; Ryan Whyte Maloney; Madilyn Paige |
| 7 | Team Adam | Team Gwen | Team Pharrell | Team Blake |
| 7 | Matt McAndrew; Chris Jamison; Damien; Mia Pfirrman; Taylor Phelan | Taylor John Williams; Ryan Sill; Anita Antoinette; Ricky Manning; Bryana Salaz | DaNica Shirey; Luke Wade; Sugar Joans; Jean Kelley; Elyjuh René | **Craig Wayne Boyd**; Reagan James; Jessie Pitts; Taylor Brashears; James David Carter |
| 8 | Team Adam | Team Pharrell | Team Christina | Team Blake |
| 8 | Joshua Davis; Deanna Johnson; Brian Johnson; Tonya Boyd-Cannon; Nathan Hermida | **Sawyer Fredericks**; Koryn Hawthorne; Mia Z Caitlin Caporale; Lowell Oakley | India Carney; Kimberly Nichole; Rob Taylor; Lexi Dávila; Sonic | Meghan Linsey; Hannah Kirby; Corey Kent White; Brooke Adee; Sarah Potenza |
| 9 | Team Adam | Team Gwen | Team Pharrell | Team Blake |
| 9 | **Jordan Smith**; Shelby Brown; Amy Vachal; Blaine Mitchell; Chance Peña; Keith Semple | Jeffery Austin; Braiden Sunshine; Korin Bukowski; Viktor Király; Ellie Lawrence; Regina Love | Madi Davis; Evan McKeel; Mark Hood; Celeste Betton; Riley Biederer; Darius Scott | Emily Ann Roberts; Barrett Baber; Zach Seabaugh; Ivonne Acero; Morgan Frazier; Nadjah Nicole |
| 10 | Team Adam | Team Pharrell | Team Christina | Team Blake |
| 10 | Laith Al-Saadi; Shalyah Fearing; Owen Danoff; Caroline Burns; Nate Butler; Brian Nhira | Hannah Huston; Daniel Passino; Emily Keener; Lacy Mandigo; Moushumi; Caity Peters | **Alisan Porter**; Bryan Bautista; Nick Hagelin; Tamar Davis; Kata Hay; Ryan Quinn | Adam Wakefield; Mary Sarah; Paxton Ingram; Katie Basden; Joe Maye; Justin Whisnant |
| 11 | Team Adam | Team Miley | Team Alicia | Team Blake |
| 11 | Billy Gilman; Josh Gallagher; Brendan Fletcher; Riley Elmore; Simone Gundy | Ali Caldwell; Aaron Gibson; Darby Walker; Sophia Urista; Belle Jewel | Wé McDonald; Christian Cuevas; Sa'Rayah; Kylie Rothfield; Josh Halverson | **Sundance Head**; Austin Allsup; Courtney Harrell; Dana Harper; Jason Warrior |
| 12 | Team Adam | Team Gwen | Team Alicia | Team Blake |
| 12 | Jesse Larson; Lilli Passero; Mark Isaiah; Hanna Eyre; Johnny Hayes; Josh West | Brennley Brown; Hunter Plake; Troy Ramey; Johnny Gates; JChosen; Quizz Swanigan | **Chris Blue**; Vanessa Ferguson; Stephanie Rice; Jack Cassidy; Ashley Levin; Anatalia Villaranda | Lauren Duski; Aliyah Moulden; TSoul; Casi Joy; Aaliyah Rose; Felicia Temple |
| 13 | Team Adam | Team Miley | Team Jennifer | Team Blake |
| 13 | Addison Agen; Adam Cunningham; Jon Mero; Anthony Alexander; Whitney Fenimore; Emily Luther | Brooke Simpson; Ashland Craft; Janice Freeman; Moriah Formica; Adam Pearce; Karli Webster | Noah Mac; Davon Fleming; Shi'Ann Jones; Lucas Holliday; Hannah Mrozak; Chris Weaver | **Chloe Kohanski**; Red Marlow; Keisha Renee; Mitchell Lee; Natalie Stovall; Esera Tuaolo |
| 14 | Team Adam | Team Alicia | Team Kelly | Team Blake |
| 14 | Rayshun LaMarr; Jackie Verna; Sharane Calister; Mia Boostrom; Drew Cole; Reid Umstattd | Britton Buchanan; Jackie Foster; Christiana Danielle; Johnny Bliss; Terrence Cunningham; Kelsea Johnson | **Brynn Cartelli**; Kaleb Lee; D.R. King; Alexa Cappelli; Dylan Hartigan; Tish Haynes Keys | Kyla Jade; Spensha Baker; Pryor Baird; Gary Edwards; Austin Giorgio; WILKES |
| 15 | Team Adam | Team Kelly | Team Jennifer | Team Blake |
| 15 | Reagan Strange; DeAndre Nico; Tyke James; Kameron Marlowe; Steve Memmolo; Radha | **Chevel Shepherd**; Sarah Grace; Kymberli Joye; Lynnea Moorer; Abby Cates; Keith Paluso; Zaxai | Kennedy Holmes; MaKenzie Thomas; SandyRedd; Patrique Fortson; Colton Smith; Franc West | Chris Kroeze; Kirk Jay; Dave Fenley; Funsho; Natasia GreyCloud; Michael Lee |
| 16 | Team Adam | Team Legend | Team Kelly | Team Blake |
| 16 | LB Crew; Mari; Betsy Ade; Domenic Haynes; Kalvin Jarvis | **Maelyn Jarmon**; Shawn Sounds; Celia Babini; Jacob Maxwell; Jimmy Mowery; Lisa Ramey | Rod Stokes; Jej Vinson; Rebecca Howell; Matthew Johnson; Abby Kasch; Presley Tennant | Gyth Rigdon; Dexter Roberts; Andrew Sevener; Kim Cherry; Carter Lloyd Horne; Oliv Blu; Kendra Checketts; Selkii |
| 17 | Team Kelly | Team Gwen | Team Legend | Team Blake |
| 17 | **Jake Hoot**; Hello Sunday; Shane Q Max Boyle; Damali Gutierrez | Rose Short; Joana Martinez; Myracle Holloway; Jake HaldenVang; Kyndal Inskeep | Katie Kadan; Will Breman; Marybeth Byrd; Alex Guthrie; Khalea Lynee | Ricky Duran; Kat Hammock; Cali Wilson; Gracee Shriver; Ricky Braddy |
| 18 | Team Kelly | Team Nick | Team Legend | Team Blake |
| 18 | Micah Iverson; Megan Danielle; Cedrice; Mandi Thomas | Thunderstorm Artis; Allegra Miles; Michael Williams; Roderick Chambers; Arei Moon | CammWess; Zan Fiskum; Mandi Castillo; Mike Jerel | **Todd Tilghman**; Toneisha Harris; Joanna Serenko; Joei Fulco |
| 19 | Team Kelly | Team Gwen | Team Legend | Team Blake |
| 19 | DeSz; Cami Clune; Tanner Gomes; Madeline Consoer | **Carter Rubin**; Ben Allen; Payge Turner; Joseph Soul | John Holiday; Tamara Jade; Bailey Rae; Chloé Hogan | Jim Ranger; Ian Flanigan; Worth The Wait; Sid Kingsley; Taryn Papa |
| 20 | Team Kelly | Team Legend | Team Nick | Team Blake |
| 20 | Kenzie Wheeler; Corey Ward; Gihanna Zoë; Zae Romeo | Victor Solomon; Pia Renee; Ryleigh Modig; Zania Alaké | Rachel Mac; Dana Monique; Jose Figueroa Jr. Devan Blake Jones; Andrew Marshall | **Cam Anthony**; Jordan Matthew Young; Pete Mroz; Anna Grace |
| 21 | Team Kelly | Team Legend | Team Ariana | Team Blake |
| 21 | **Girl Named Tom**; Hailey Mia; Jeremy Rosado; Gymani; Katie Rae | Jershika Maple; Joshua Vacanti; Shadale; Samuel Harness; David Vogel | Jim & Sasha Allen; Holly Forbes; Ryleigh Plank; Bella DeNapoli; Vaughn Mugol; Raquel Trinidad | Wendy Moten; Paris Winningham; Lana Scott; Peedy Chavis; Libianca |
| 22 | Team Legend | Team Gwen | Team Camila | Team Blake |
| 22 | Omar Jose Cardona; Parijita Bastola; Kim Cruse; Sasha Hurtado | Justin Aaron; Kique; Alyssa Witrado; Kevin Hawkins | Morgan Myles; Devix; Eric Who; Kate Kalvach | **Bryce Leatherwood**; Bodie; Brayden Lape; Rowan Grace |
| 23 | Team Kelly | Team Chance | Team Niall | Team Blake |
| 23 | D.Smooth; Holly Brand; ALI; Cait Martin; Neil Salsich | Sorelle; Ray Uriel; Kala Banham; Jamar Langley; Manasseh Samone | **Gina Miles**; Ryley Tate Wilson; Michael B. Ross Clayton; Tasha Jessen | Grace West; Noivas; Rachel Christine; Mary Kate Connor; Kylee Dayne |
| 24 | Team Legend | Team Gwen | Team Niall | Team Reba |
| 24 | Lila Forde; Mac Royals; Azán; Kristen Brown; Taylor Deneen; Kaylee Shimizu | Bias; Tanner Massey; Kara Tenae; Rudi; Stee; Lennon VanderDoes | **Huntley**; Mara Justine; Nini Iris; Claudia B. Julia Roome; Alexa Wildish | Ruby Leigh; Jacquie Roar; Jordan Rainer; Ms. Monét; Noah Spencer; Tom Nitti |
| 25 | Team Legend | Team Dan + Shay | Team Chance | Team Reba |
| 25 | Bryan Olesen; Nathan Chester; Zoe Levert; Kamalei Kawaʻa; Mafe | Karen Waldrup; Madison Curbelo; Tae Lewis; Olivia Rubini; Anya True | Serenity Arce; Maddi Jane; Nadège; RLetto; Kyle Schuesler | **Asher HaVon**; Josh Sanders; L. Rodgers; Justin & Jeremy Garcia; Jackie Romeo |
| 26 | Team Bublé | Team Gwen | Team Reba | Team Snoop |
| 26 | **Sofronio Vasquez**; Shye; Jaukeem Fortson; Sloane Simon; Cameron Wright | Sydney Sterlace; Jan Dan; Jose Luis; Jake Tankersley; Gabrielle Zabosky | Danny Joseph; Adam Bohanan; Katie O Edward Preble; Lauren-Michael Sellers | Jeremy Beloate; Christina Eagle; Mikaela Ayira; Aliyah Khaylyn; Austyns Stancil |
| 27 | Team Legend | Team Bublé | Team Kelsea | Team Adam |
| 27 | Renzo; Bryson Battle; Olivia Kuper Harris; Bd.ii; Ari Camille | **Adam David**; Jadyn Cree; Kaiya Hamilton; Barry Jean Fontenot; Angie Rey | Jaelen Johnston; Iris Herrera; Alanna Lynise; Darius J. Tinika Wyatt | Lucia Flores-Wiseman; Kolby Cordell; Conor James; Ethan Eckenroad; Britton Moore |
| 28 | Team Bublé | Team Reba | Team Niall | Team Snoop |
| 28 | Max Chambers; Jazz McKenzie; Rob Cole; Trinity | Aubrey Nicole; Ryan Mitchell; Aaron Nichols; Peyton Kyle | **Aiden Ross**; DEK of Hearts; Kirbi; Ava Nat | Ralph Edwards; Toni Lorene; Mindy Miller; Yoshihanaa |
| 29 | Team Legend | Team Kelly | Team Adam | —N/a |
| 29 | Lucas West; Syd Millevoi; KJ Willis | Liv Ciara; Mikenley Brown; JW Griffin | **Alexia Jayy**; Jeremy Keith; Jared Shoemaker | —N/a |
| 30 | Team Kelly | Team Riley | Team Queen | Team Adam |
| 30 | Koumba Diallo; Brianna Cameron; Kyle Davis; Anna McElroy | Ferryn & Brinkley; Joe Henley; Cade Mower | BigCountry; Mia Knight; Lillie Kolich | Lexi Stephens; Connor Closs; Dakota Cohen |
| 31 | Team Riley | Team Queen | Team Joe | —N/a |
| 31 | Upcoming season | | | —N/a |

== Series overview ==
Warning: the following table presents a significant amount of different colors.

Teams color key
| Artist from Team Adam | Artist from Team Alicia | Artist from Team Chance |
| Artist from Team Blake | Artist from Team Miley | Artist from Team Niall |
| Artist from Team CeeLo | Artist from Team Kelly | Artist from Team Reba |
| Artist from Team Christina | Artist from Team JHud | Artist from Team Dan + Shay |
| Artist from Team Usher | Artist from Team Legend | Artist from Team Bublé |
| Artist from Team Pharrell | Artist from Team Nick | Artist from Team Snoop |
| Artist from Team Gwen | Artist from Team Camila | Artist from Team Kelsea |

The Voice series overview
| Y | # | Winner | Runner-up | Third place | Fourth place | Fifth place | Sixth place | Winning coach |
|---|---|---|---|---|---|---|---|---|
| 2011 | 1 | Javier Colon | Dia Frampton | Beverly McClellan | Vicci Martinez | | | Adam Levine |
| 2012 | 2 | Jermaine Paul | Juliet Simms | Tony Lucca | Chris Mann | | | Blake Shelton |
| 2012 | 3 | Cassadee Pope | Terry McDermott | Nicholas David | | | | Blake Shelton |
| 2013 | 4 | Danielle Bradbery | Michelle Chamuel | The Swon Brothers | | | | Blake Shelton |
| 2013 | 5 | Tessanne Chin | Jacquie Lee | Will Champlin | | | | Adam Levine |
| 2014 | 6 | Josh Kaufman | Jake Worthington | Christina Grimmie | | | | Usher |
| 2014 | 7 | Craig Wayne Boyd | Matt McAndrew | Chris Jamison | Damien | | | Blake Shelton |
| 2015 | 8 | Sawyer Fredericks | Meghan Linsey | Joshua Davis | Koryn Hawthorne | | | Pharrell Williams |
| 2015 | 9 | Jordan Smith | Emily Ann Roberts | Barrett Baber | Jeffery Austin | | | Adam Levine |
| 2016 | 10 | Alisan Porter | Adam Wakefield | Hannah Huston | Laith Al-Saadi | | | Christina Aguilera |
| 2016 | 11 | Sundance Head | Billy Gilman | Wé McDonald | Josh Gallagher | | | Blake Shelton |
| 2017 | 12 | Chris Blue | Lauren Duski | Aliyah Moulden | Jesse Larson | | | Alicia Keys |
| 2017 | 13 | Chloe Kohanski | Addison Agen | Brooke Simpson | Red Marlow | | | Blake Shelton |
| 2018 | 14 | Brynn Cartelli | Britton Buchanan | Kyla Jade | Spensha Baker | | | Kelly Clarkson |
| 2018 | 15 | Chevel Shepherd | Chris Kroeze | Kirk Jay | Kennedy Holmes | | | Kelly Clarkson |
| 2019 | 16 | Maelyn Jarmon | Gyth Rigdon | Dexter Roberts | Andrew Sevener | | | John Legend |
| 2019 | 17 | Jake Hoot | Ricky Duran | Katie Kadan | Rose Short | | | Kelly Clarkson |
| 2020 | 18 | Todd Tilghman | Toneisha Harris | Thunderstorm Artis | CammWess | Micah Iverson | | Blake Shelton |
| 2020 | 19 | Carter Rubin | Jim Ranger | Ian Flanigan | DeSz | John Holiday | | Gwen Stefani |
| 2021 | 20 | Cam Anthony | Kenzie Wheeler | Jordan Matthew Young | Rachel Mac | Victor Solomon | | Blake Shelton |
| 2021 | 21 | Girl Named Tom | Wendy Moten | Paris Winningham | Hailey Mia | Jershika Maple | | Kelly Clarkson |
| 2022 | 22 | Bryce Leatherwood | Bodie | Morgan Myles | Omar Jose Cardona | Brayden Lape | | Blake Shelton |
| 2023 | 23 | Gina Miles | Grace West | D.Smooth | Sorelle | Noivas | | Niall Horan |
| 2023 | 24 | Huntley | Ruby Leigh | Mara Justine | Jacquie Roar | Lila Forde | | Niall Horan |
| 2024 | 25 | Asher HaVon | Josh Sanders | Bryan Olesen | Nathan Chester | Karen Waldrup | | Reba McEntire |
| 2024 | 26 | Sofronio Vasquez | Shye | Sydney Sterlace | Danny Joseph | Jeremy Beloate | | Michael Bublé |
| 2025 | 27 | Adam David | Jaelen Johnston | Renzo | Lucia Flores-Wiseman | Jadyn Cree | | Michael Bublé |
| 2025 | 28 | Aiden Ross | Ralph Edwards | DEK of Hearts | Aubrey Nicole | Max Chambers | Jazz McKenzie | Niall Horan |
| 2026 | 29 | Alexia Jayy | Liv Ciara | Lucas West | Mikenley Brown | | | Adam Levine |
| 2026 | 30 | Current season | | | | | | |
| 2027 | 31 | Upcoming season | | | | | | |

=== Coaches' results ===
Considering the final placement of the contestants who are members of their team (not the final placement of the coaches):

Coaches' results
| Coach | Winner | Runner-up | Third place | Fourth place | Fifth place | Sixth place |
|---|---|---|---|---|---|---|
| Blake Shelton | 9 times (2–4, 7, 11, 13, 18, 20, 22) | 15 times (1, 3, 6, 8–10, 12, 15–19, 21–23) | 9 times (4, 9, 12, 14–16, 19–21) | 3 times (13, 14, 16) | 2 times (22, 23) | —N/a |
| Adam Levine | 4 times (1, 5, 9, 29) | 3 times (7, 11, 13) | 5 times (2, 5–8) | 5 times (7, 10–12, 27) | —N/a | —N/a |
| Kelly Clarkson | 4 times (14, 15, 17, 21) | 2 times (20, 29) | 1 time (23) | 3 times (19, 21, 29) | 1 time (18) | —N/a |
| Niall Horan | 3 times (23, 24, 28) | —N/a | 2 times (24, 28) | —N/a | —N/a | —N/a |
| Michael Bublé | 2 times (26, 27) | 1 time (26) | —N/a | —N/a | 2 times (27, 28) | 1 time (28) |
| Reba McEntire | 1 time (25) | 2 times (24, 25) | —N/a | 3 times (24, 26, 28) | —N/a | —N/a |
| Christina Aguilera | 1 time (10) | 1 time (5) | 1 time (1) | 1 time (2) | —N/a | —N/a |
| Alicia Keys | 1 time (12) | 1 time (14) | 1 time (11) | —N/a | —N/a | —N/a |
| Usher | 1 time (6) | 1 time (4) | —N/a | —N/a | —N/a | —N/a |
| John Legend | 1 time (16) | —N/a | 4 times (17, 25, 27, 29) | 3 times (18, 22, 25) | 4 times (19–21, 24) | —N/a |
| Gwen Stefani | 1 time (19) | —N/a | 1 time (26) | 2 times (9, 17) | —N/a | —N/a |
| Pharrell Williams | 1 time (8) | —N/a | 1 time (10) | 1 time (8) | —N/a | —N/a |
| CeeLo Green | —N/a | 1 time (2) | 1 time (3) | 1 time (1) | —N/a | —N/a |
| Snoop Dogg | —N/a | 1 time (28) | —N/a | —N/a | 1 time (26) | —N/a |
| Kelsea Ballerini | —N/a | 1 time (27) | —N/a | —N/a | —N/a | —N/a |
| Nick Jonas | —N/a | —N/a | 1 time (18) | 1 time (20) | —N/a | —N/a |
| Miley Cyrus | —N/a | —N/a | 1 time (13) | —N/a | —N/a | —N/a |
| Camila Cabello | —N/a | —N/a | 1 time (22) | —N/a | —N/a | —N/a |
| Jennifer Hudson | —N/a | —N/a | —N/a | 1 time (15) | —N/a | —N/a |
| Chance the Rapper | —N/a | —N/a | —N/a | 1 time (23) | —N/a | —N/a |
| Dan + Shay | —N/a | —N/a | —N/a | —N/a | 1 time (25) | —N/a |
| Shakira | —N/a | —N/a | —N/a | —N/a | —N/a | —N/a |
| Ariana Grande | —N/a | —N/a | —N/a | —N/a | —N/a | —N/a |
| Riley Green | TBD | | | | | |
| Queen Latifah | TBD | | | | | |
| Joe Jonas | TBD | | | | | |

== Reception ==
=== Ratings ===
The first season premiered strong at 11.78 million viewers and actually grew upon that audience through its first season. In the 18–49 demographic, the show constantly found itself in the top 5. For its average season rating, the show landed itself as no. 20 with total viewers at nearly 12 million viewers. In the 18–49 rankings, the show was no. 4 at a 5.4 ranking.

The second season premiered on Super Bowl Sunday, February 5, 2012, and for a while managed to keep a 6.0 in the adults 18–49 demographic and 17 million viewers. Partnering The Voice with Smash (NBC's musical Lab) helped NBC win the Monday night ratings. However, by Monday, April 9, the ratings had fallen to a 4.0 rating in the adult 18–49 demographic.

The third season premiered on Monday, September 10, 2012, to 12.28 million viewers and a 4.2 rating in the 18–49 demographic and has since then grown to a season-high 4.8 rating in the 18–49 demographic on October 8, October 15 and 29, 2012 and a 4.9 rating in the finale. The Voice, along with NBC's new Lab, Revolution has once again led NBC to win every Monday night of the season so far, just like it did last season. On Tuesdays, comedies Go On and The New Normal has been successful thanks to The Voice, leading NBC to be the only network of the Big 5 to grow in ratings from last season.

Each U.S. network television season starts in late September and ends in late May, which coincides with the completion of May sweeps.

The Voice ratings
| Season | Timeslot (ET) | # Ep. | Premiered | | Ended | | TV season | Season ranking | Viewers (in millions) |
| Season | Timeslot (ET) | # Ep. | Date | Premiere viewers (in millions) | Date | Finale viewers (in millions) | TV season | Season ranking | Viewers (in millions) |
|---|---|---|---|---|---|---|---|---|---|
| 1 | Tuesday 9:00 pm (eps. 1–2, 7–9, 11); Tuesday 10:00 pm (eps. 3–6); Wednesday 8:15 pm (ep. 10); Wednesday 8:00 pm (finale) | 12 | April 26, 2011 | 11.78 | June 29, 2011 | 11.05 | 2010–11 | 20 | 12.33 |
| 2 | Sunday 10:21 pm Monday 8:00 pm Tuesday 9:00 pm | 21 | February 5, 2012 | 37.61 | May 8, 2012 | 11.90 | 2011–12 | 9 | 15.76^{[†]} |
| 3 | Monday 8:00 pm Tuesday 8:00 pm Wednesday 8:00 pm Thursday 8:00 pm (ep. 20); Tuesday 9:00 pm (finale) | 32 | September 10, 2012 | 12.28 | December 18, 2012 | 14.13 | 2012–13 | 10 | 14.24 |
| 4 | Monday 8:00 pm Tuesday 8:00 pm Tuesday 9:00 pm (finale) | 28 | March 25, 2013 | 13.64 | June 18, 2013 | 15.59 | 2012–13 | 10 | 14.24 |
| 5 | Monday 8:00 pm Tuesday 8:00 pm Tuesday 9:00 pm Thursday 8:00 pm (ep. 15) | 27 | September 23, 2013 | 14.98 | December 17, 2013 | 14.01 | 2013–14 | 7 | 14.57 |
| 6 | Monday 8:00 pm Tuesday 8:00 pm Tuesday 9:00 pm (finale) | 26 | February 24, 2014 | 15.86 | May 20, 2014 | 11.69 | 2013–14 | 7 | 14.57 |
| 7 | Monday 8:00 pm Tuesday 8:00 pm Tuesday 9:00 pm (finale) | 27 | September 22, 2014 | 12.95 | December 16, 2014 | 12.88 | 2014–15 | 12 | 13.80 |
| 8 | Monday 8:00 pm Tuesday 8:00 pm Tuesday 9:00 pm (finale) | 28 | February 23, 2015 | 13.97 | May 19, 2015 | 11.56 | 2014–15 | 12 | 13.80 |
| 9 | Monday 8:00 pm Tuesday 8:00 pm (eps. 2, 4, 6, 16–26); Tuesday 9:00 pm (eps. 8, 10, 12, 14, 27) | 27 | September 21, 2015 | 12.37 | December 15, 2015 | 12.69 | 2015–16 | 9 | 13.33 |
| 10 | Monday 8:00 pm Tuesday 8:00 pm Tuesday 9:00 pm (finale) | 28 | February 29, 2016 | 13.33 | May 24, 2016 | 10.59 | 2015–16 | 9 | 13.33 |
| 11 | Monday 8:00 pm Tuesday 8:00 pm Tuesday 9:00 pm (finale) | 26 | September 19, 2016 | 12.10 | December 13, 2016 | 12.14 | 2016–17 | 13 | 12.40 |
| 12 | Monday 8:00 pm Tuesday 8:00 pm Tuesday 9:00 pm (finale) | 28 | February 27, 2017 | 13.03 | May 23, 2017 | 9.35 | 2016–17 | 13 | 12.40 |
| 13 | Monday 8:00 pm Tuesday 8:00 pm Tuesday 9:00 pm (finale) | 27 | September 25, 2017 | 10.57 | December 19, 2017 | 10.91 | 2017–18 | 14 | 11.85 |
| 14 | Monday 8:00 pm Tuesday 8:00 pm Tuesday 9:00 pm (finale) | 28 | February 26, 2018 | 12.31 | May 22, 2018 | 8.77 | 2017–18 | 14 | 11.85 |
| 15 | Monday 8:00 pm Tuesday 8:00 pm Tuesday 9:00 pm (finale) | 26 | September 24, 2018 | 9.66 | December 18, 2018 | 9.89 | 2018–19 | 20 | 10.71 |
| 16 | Monday 8:00 pm Tuesday 8:00 pm (eps. 2, 4, 11, 13); Tuesday 9:00 pm (eps. 15, 17, 19, 21, 23) | 23 | February 25, 2019 | 10.77 | May 21, 2019 | 7.42 | 2018–19 | 20 | 10.71 |
| 17 | Monday 8:00 pm Tuesday 8:00 pm Tuesday 9:00 pm (eps. 22, 24, 26) | 26 | September 23, 2019 | 8.93 | December 17, 2019 | 8.66 | 2019–20 | 16 | 10.23 |
| 18 | Monday 8:00 pm Tuesday 8:00 pm (eps. 2, 13, 15, 17); Tuesday 9:00 pm (ep. 18) | 18 | February 24, 2020 | 8.99 | May 19, 2020 | 7.54 | 2019–20 | 16 | 10.23 |
| 19 | Monday 8:00 pm Tuesday 8:00 pm Tuesday 9:00 pm (ep. 19) | 19 | October 19, 2020 | 8.20 | December 15, 2020 | 7.26 | 2020–21 | 17 | 8.40 |
| 20 | Monday 8:00 pm Tuesday 9:00 pm (eps. 2, 4); Tuesday 8:00 pm (eps. 14, 16, 18) | 18 | March 1, 2021 | 7.89 | May 25, 2021 | 6.73 | 2020–21 | 17 | 8.40 |
| 21 | Monday 8:00 pm Tuesday 8:00 pm Tuesday 9:00 pm (ep. 26) | 26 | September 20, 2021 | 7.22 | December 14, 2021 | 6.98 | 2021–22 | TBA | TBA |
| 22 | Monday 8:00 pm Tuesday 8:00 pm Tuesday 9:00 pm (ep. 26) | 26 | September 19, 2022 | 6.12 | December 13, 2022 | 6.95 | 2022–23 | TBA | TBA |
| 23 | Monday 8:00 pm Tuesday 9:00 pm | 19 | March 6, 2023 | 6.44 | May 23, 2023 | 6.21 | 2022–23 | TBA | TBA |
| 24 | Monday 8:00 pm Tuesday 8:00 pm (eps. 2, 4); Tuesday 9:00 pm | 26 | September 25, 2023 | 6.26 | December 19, 2023 | 6.67 | 2023–24 | 21 | 7.14 |
| 25 | Monday 8:00 pm Tuesday 9:00 pm | 21 | February 26, 2024 | 6.33 | May 21, 2024 | 5.11 | 2023–24 | 21 | 7.14 |
| 26 | Monday 8:00 pm Tuesday 8:00 pm (eps. 4, 6); Tuesday 8:30 pm (eps. 8); Tuesday 9:00 pm | 22 | September 23, 2024 | 5.96 | December 10, 2024 | 5.71 | 2024–25 | | |
| 27 | Monday 8:00 pm Monday 9:00 pm (eps. 10); Tuesday 8:00 pm (eps. 18); Tuesday 9:00 pm (eps. 16, 19) | 19 | February 3, 2025 | 5.68 | May 20, 2025 | 4.25 | 2024–25 | | |
| 28 | Monday 8:00 pm Monday 9:00 pm (eps. 11–17); Tuesday 8:00 pm Tuesday 9:00 pm (eps. 4, 19) | 19 | September 22, 2025 | 5.21 | December 16, 2025 | N/A | 2025–26 | | |
| 29 | Monday 9:00 pm Tuesday 9:00 pm (Season Finale) | 10 | February 23, 2026 | N/A | April 14, 2026 | N/A | 2025–26 | | |
| 30 | Monday 8:00 pm Monday 9:00 pm (After November 9); Tuesday 8:00 pm | | September 21, 2026 | 5.33 | | TBA | 2026–27 | | |

† Including an episode that aired after a live broadcast of the Super Bowl:

- 10:19–10:30 = 46.786 million viewers (retention: 76.68% – football game itself reached a peak of 118.355 million viewers)
- 10:30–10:45 = 39.494 million viewers
- 10:45–11:00 = 36.310 million viewers
- 11:00–11:15 = 32.630 million viewers
- 11:15–11:21 = 31.792 million viewers

== Video game ==
The Voice: I Want You is a video game based on the television show. It was released on PlayStation 3, Xbox 360, Wii, and Wii U on October 21, 2014, and was published by Activision. The game includes a microphone and has songs from the show including songs performed by the coaches.

== Broadcast ==
The Voice is broadcast on the NBC network in the United States. The show premiered in Canada on April 26, 2011, on CTV. In Asia, the series began airing on August 21, 2011, on AXN and was transferred to Star World (now Fox Life) starting in Season 11 until cessation of transmission on October 1, 2021. It premiered in New Zealand on July 16, 2011, on TV2, in Australia on August 9, 2011, on Go!, in South Africa on October 5, 2011, on SABC 3, and on March 31, 2012, in the Philippines on Studio 23 (later known as S+A). On May 22, 2019, it premiered in Germany on sixx starting Season 14.
