= The Voice (American TV series) season 18 =

Season of television series

The Voice
- Season 18
- Promotional poster featuring coaches Legend, Clarkson, Shelton, and Jonas
- Hosted by: Carson Daly
- Coaches: Kelly Clarkson; Nick Jonas; John Legend; Blake Shelton
- No. of contestants: 40 artists
- Winner: Todd Tilghman
- Winning coach: Blake Shelton
- Runner-up: Toneisha Harris
- No. of episodes: 18

Release
- Original network: NBC
- Original release: February 24 – May 19, 2020

Season chronology
- ← Previous; Season 17 Next → Season 19

The eighteenth season of the American reality television series The Voice ran from February 24 to May 19, 2020, on NBC. Blake Shelton, Kelly Clarkson and John Legend returned as coaches for their eighteenth, fifth, and third season, respectively. Nick Jonas joined the panel for his first season as a new coach, replacing Gwen Stefani. Meanwhile, Carson Daly returned for his eighteenth season as host.

This is the third season in The Voice since seasons season 1 and season 3 where the team sizes was not 12, as it was reduced to ten. This is also the first season to have five artists compete in the finale, and the first time each coach would guarantee to have at least one artist representing in the finale since season two. For the first time since season 2, artists are not awarded any multiplier bonuses for streams or iTunes downloads due to the performances being recorded away from the studios (except for the finals) as a measure against the ongoing COVID-19 pandemic.

Todd Tilghman was named the winner of the season, marking Blake Shelton's record-extending seventh win as a coach, making him the oldest winner to date in the show's history – following Josh Kaufman in the 6th season. For the first time, the first artist in the Blind Auditions went on to win the entire season.

During the finale, Daly forwent the announcement of third place and instead proceeded to announce Tilghman winning the season, without revealing the final placements for Thunderstorm Artis or Toneisha Harris. However, through The Voice Twitter page, Harris was revealed to finish as runner-up, which made her the highest-placed African American female singer in Voice history until Alexia Jayy became the winner of season 29.

== Coaches and hosts ==
Coaches and Host of The Voice Season 18

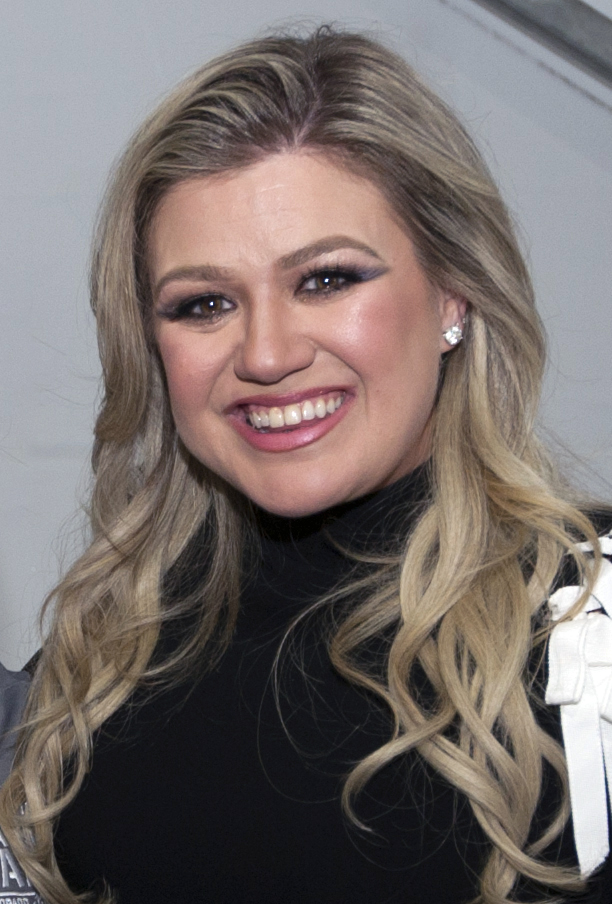
Kelly Clarkson

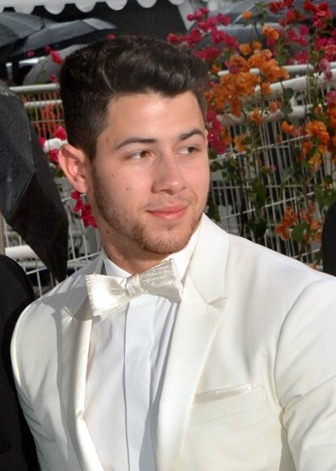
Nick Jonas

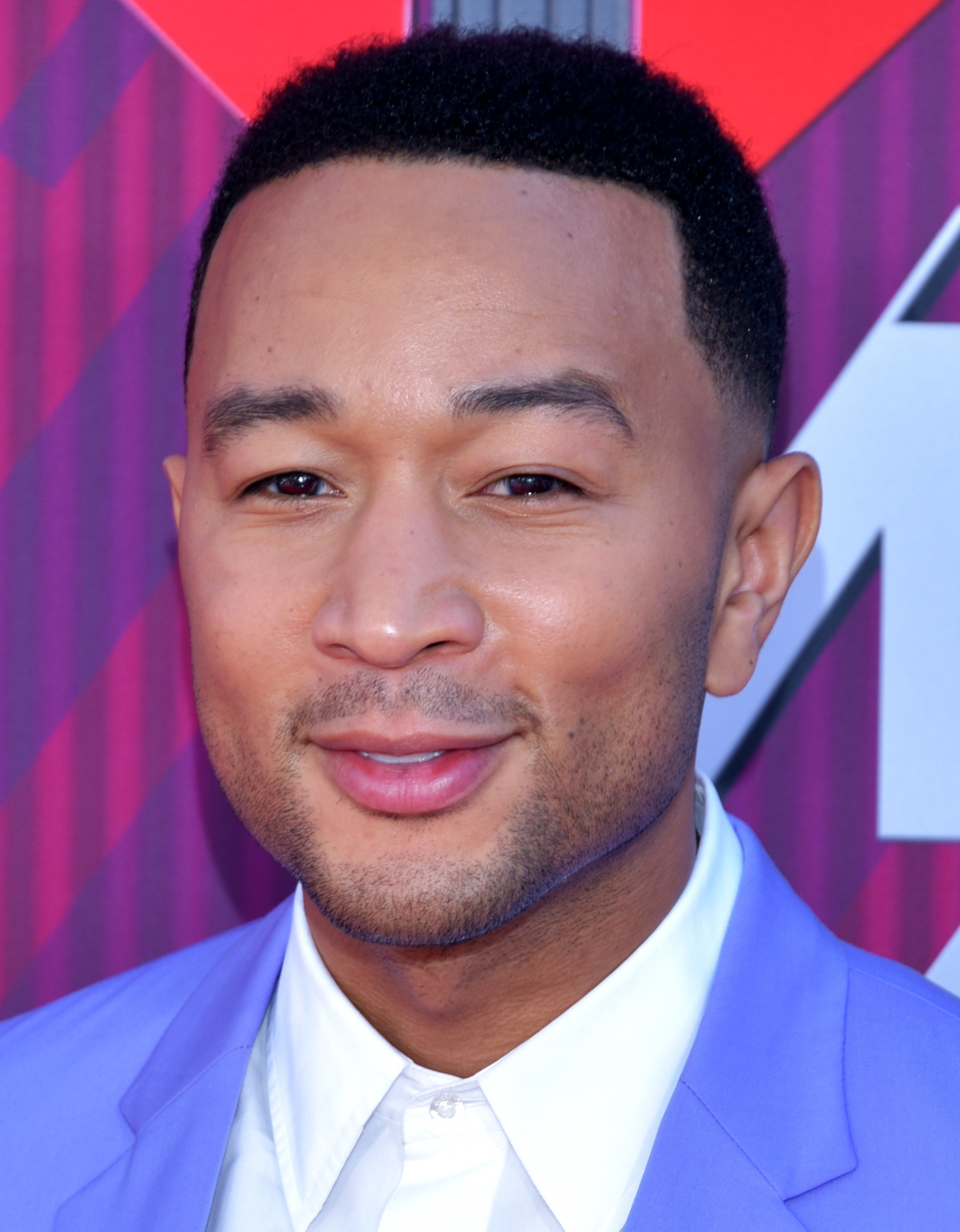
John Legend

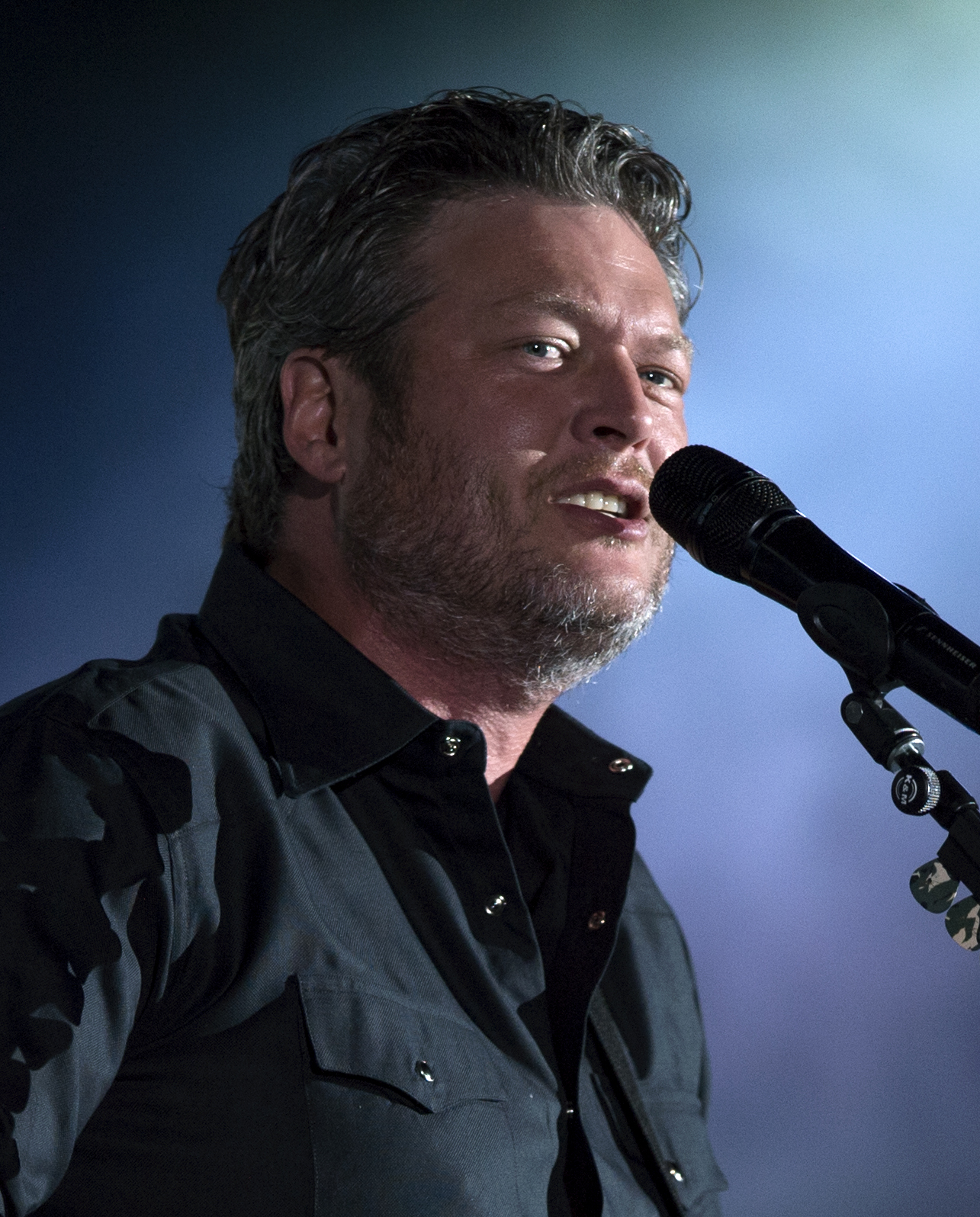
Blake Shelton

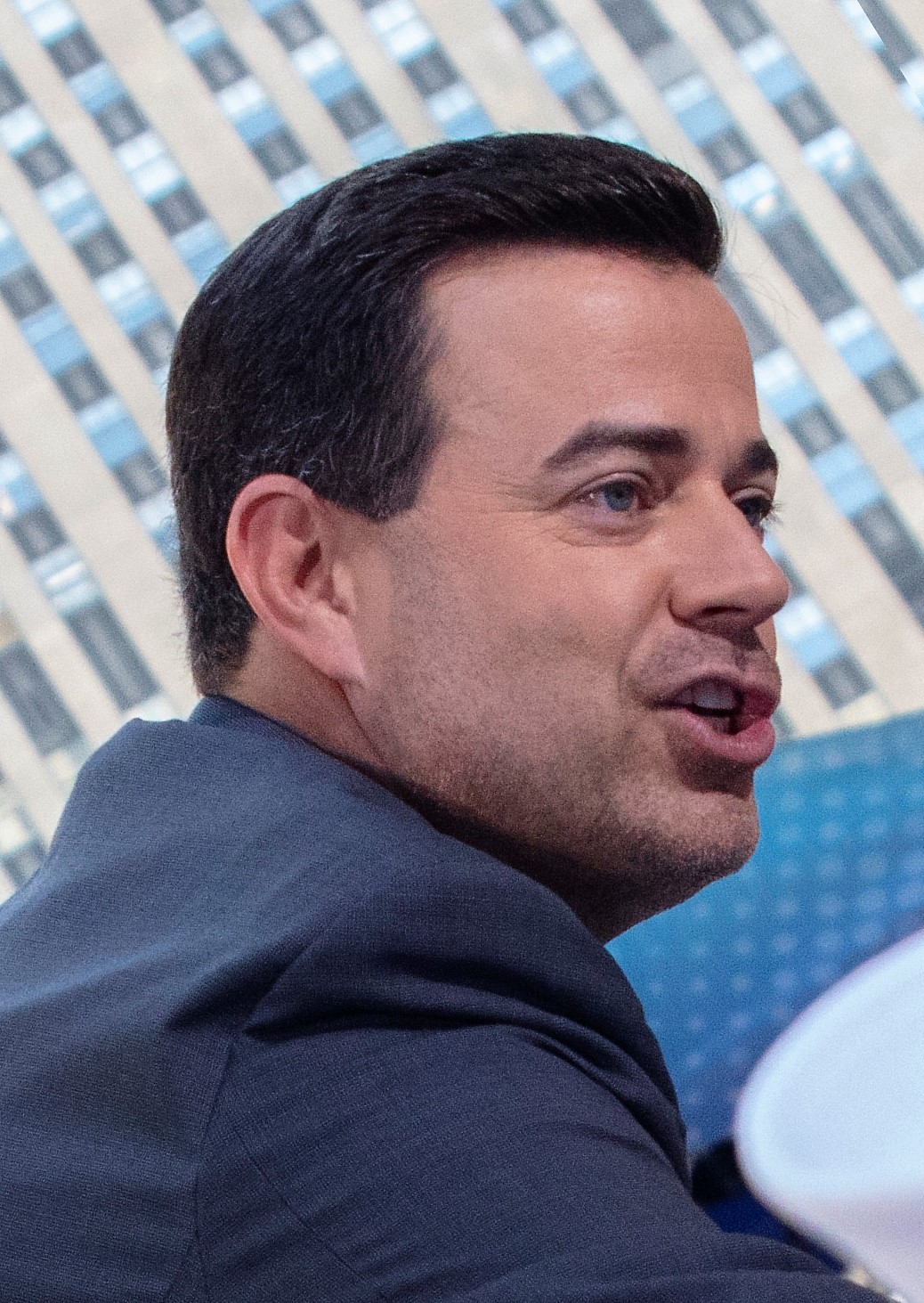
Carson Daly

In October 2019, it was announced that Nick Jonas would join the show as a coach for this season replacing Gwen Stefani who left the panel due to her Just a Girl Las Vegas Residency. This is his second appearance, as he was the Battle Advisor for the 8th season for Team Christina. Blake Shelton returned for his eighteenth season as a coach, John Legend for his third, and Kelly Clarkson for her fifth. This is the twelfth season to feature three male coaches on the panel.

This season's advisors for the Battles are: Dua Lipa for Team Kelly, Joe and Kevin Jonas (Jonas Brothers) for Team Nick, Ella Mai for Team Legend, and Bebe Rexha (who was the coach for 16th season's Comeback Stage) for Team Blake.

James Taylor served as a mega-mentor for all teams during the Knockouts.

== Teams ==
Color key

- Winner
- Runner-up
- Third place
- Fourth place
- Fifth place
- Eliminated in Live Semi-Final
- Eliminated in the Live Playoffs
- Stolen in the Knockouts
- Eliminated in the Knockouts
- Stolen in the Battles
- Eliminated in the Battles

Coaches	Top 40 artists			
Kelly Clarkson				
Kelly Clarkson	Micah Iverson	Megan Danielle	Cedrice Webber	Mandi Thomas
Kelly Clarkson	~~CammWess~~	Samantha Howell	Anaya Cheyenne	Tayler Green
Kelly Clarkson	Chelle Cox	Sara Collins	Gigi Hess	Jules Cupples
Nick Jonas				
Nick Jonas	Thunderstorm Artis	Allegra Miles	Michael Williams	Roderick Chambers
Nick Jonas	Arei Moon	Tate Brusa	Jacob Miller	Jon Mullins
Nick Jonas	~~Joanna Serenko~~	Anders Drerup	Kevin Farris	Samuel Wilco
John Legend				
John Legend	CammWess	Zan Fiskum	Mandi Castillo	Mike Jerel
John Legend	~~Thunderstorm Artis~~	~~Joanna Serenko~~	Nelson Cade III	Darious Lyles
John Legend	~~CammWess~~	~~Cedrice~~	Brittney Allen	Zach Day
Blake Shelton				
Blake Shelton	Todd Tilghman	Toneisha Harris	Joanna Serenko	Joei Fulco
Blake Shelton	~~Cedrice~~	Todd Michael Hall	Cam Spinks	Levi Watkins
Blake Shelton	~~Jon Mullins~~	Kailey Abel	Jamal Corrie	Jacob Daniel Murphy
Note: Italicized names are stolen artists (names struck through within former teams). Underlined names are artists who were saved by their coach in the Battles and advanced to the 4-way Knockout Round.

== Blind auditions ==
Blind auditions color key
✔	Coach hit his/her "I WANT YOU" button
	Artist defaulted to this coach's team
	Artist was eliminated with no coach pressing their button
✘	Coach pressed "I WANT YOU" button, but was blocked by another coach from getting the artist
	Blocked by Kelly; Blocked by Nick; Blocked by John; Blocked by Blake

=== Episode 1 (Feb. 24) ===
Among this episode's auditionees was Emily Bass, who previously auditioned unsuccessfully in season 17.

Order	Artist	Age	Hometown	Song	Coach's and artist's choices			
Order	Artist	Age	Hometown	Song	Kelly	Nick	John	Blake
1	Todd Tilghman	41	Meridian, Mississippi	"We've Got Tonight"	✔	✔	✔	✔
2	Nelson Cade III	27	Anaheim, California	"Pride & Joy"	✔	✘	✔	✔
3	Tate Brusa	16	Salt Lake City, Utah	"Perfect"	–	✔	–	✔
4	Tayler Green	27	Los Angeles, California	"Issues"	✔	✔	–	–
5	Ashley Plath	20	Middletown, New Jersey	"Baby, It's You"	–	–	–	–
6	Darious Lyles	30	Chicago, Illinois	"How Do You Sleep?"	✔	–	✔	–
7	Megan Danielle	17	Douglasville, Georgia	"Remedy"	✔	–	–	–
8	Chrissy Joly	32	Brooklyn, New York	"Don't Let Me Down"	–	–	–	–
9	Todd Michael Hall	50	Saginaw, Michigan	"Jukebox Hero"	–	–	✔	✔
10	Emily Bass	16	Magnolia, Texas	"Love Yourself"	–	–	–	–
11	Joanna Serenko	18	St. Louis, Missouri	"All My Loving"	✔	✔	✔	✔

=== Episode 2 (Feb. 25) ===
Among this episode's auditionees were Zach Day and Arei Moon, who previously competed on the thirteenth and fifteenth seasons of American Idol.

Order	Artist	Age	Hometown	Song	Coach's and artist's choices			
Order	Artist	Age	Hometown	Song	Kelly	Nick	John	Blake
1	Arei Moon	28	Boston, Massachusetts	"Miss Independent"	✘	✔	–	–
2	Levi Watkins	14	Birmingham, Alabama	"Hey, Soul Sister"	–	–	–	✔
3	Cassidy Lee	22	Jacksonville, Florida	"Gold Dust Woman"	–	–	–	–
4	Zach Day	25	Stearns, Kentucky	"Weak"	✔	–	✔	–
5	Chelle	18	Bargersville, Indiana	"idontwannabeyouanymore"	✔	✔	–	✔
6	Toneisha Harris	44	Roswell, Georgia	"I Want to Know What Love Is"	✔	✔	✔	✔

=== Episode 3 (March 2) ===
Among this episode's auditionees was Samantha Howell, who previously competed on the seventeenth season of American Idol.

Order	Artist	Age	Hometown	Song	Coach's and artist's choices			
Order	Artist	Age	Hometown	Song	Kelly	Nick	John	Blake
1	Allegra Miles	16	St. John, U.S. Virgin Islands	"Use Somebody"	✔	✔	–	–
2	CammWess	21	Blythewood, South Carolina	"Earned It (Fifty Shades of Grey)"	–	–	✔	✔
3	Joei Fulco	22	Lancaster, California	"Gypsys, Tramps & Thieves"	–	✘	–	✔
4	Sara Collins	18	Baton Rouge, Louisiana	"Johnny & June"	✔	✔	–	–
5	Clerida	30	Long Island, New York	"Put Your Records On"	–	–	–	–
6	Samantha Howell	19	Virginia Beach, Virginia	"Take It on the Run"	✔	✔	–	✘
7	Jamal Corrie	26	San Francisco, California	"Be Alright"	–	–	–	✔
8	Ruby G	29	Brooklyn, New York	"Hard Place"	–	–	–	–
9	Samuel Wilco	39	Fort Knox, Kentucky	"Lately"	✔	✔	–	–
10	Hawk McIntyre	20	Boone, Iowa	"Lie to Me"	–	–	–	–
11	Thunderstorm Artis	23	Haleiwa, Hawaii	"Blackbird"	✔	✔	✔	✔

=== Episode 4 (March 9) ===
Order	Artist	Age	Hometown	Song	Coach's and artist's choices			
Order	Artist	Age	Hometown	Song	Kelly	Nick	John	Blake
1	Anaya Cheyenne	16	Norwalk, Connecticut	"I'll Never Love Again"	✔	–	–	✔
2	Mandi Thomas	33	Memphis, Tennessee	"Con Te Partirò"	✔	–	–	–
3	Ari Tibi	27	Calabasas, California	"The Joke"	–	–	–	–
4	Jacob Miller	29	Eden, Wisconsin	"The Times They Are A-Changin'"	✔	✔	–	✔
5	Jon Mullins	32	Lynchburg, Virginia	"Don't Give Up On Me"	–	–	–	✔
6	Jacob Daniel Murphy	27	Elk Grove, California	"Until You Come Back To Me"	–	–	–	✔
7	Zan Fiskum	22	Seattle, Washington	"Light On"	✔	✔	✔	–
8	Chan Fuze	23	Chicago, Illinois	"Groove Me"	–	–	–	–
9	Roderick Chambers	38	Miami, Florida	"Back at One"	–	✔	–	–
10	Jules	15	Peoria, Arizona	"Ain't No Rest for the Wicked"	✔	–	–	✔
11	Jared Harper	22	San Francisco, California	"(I Can't Get No) Satisfaction"	–	–	–	–
12	Michael Williams	18	Mason, Ohio	"You Say"	–	✔	–	–
13	Mike Jerel	31	Ashburn, Georgia	"It's a Man's Man's Man's World"	✔	✔	✔	✔

=== Episode 5 (March 16) ===
The Coaches performed "Jealous" at the start of the show.

Among this episode's auditionees were Brittney Allen, who previously competed on the tenth season of America's Got Talent, and Kailey Abel, who previously competed on the fifteenth season of American Idol.

Order	Artist	Age	Hometown	Song	Coach's and artist's choices			
Order	Artist	Age	Hometown	Song	Kelly	Nick	John	Blake
1	Micah Iverson	26	Tokyo, Japan	"All I Want"	✔	✔	–	✔
2	Brittney Allen	28	Columbus, Georgia	"Dancing on My Own"	–	–	✔	–
3	Tracey Preston	35	Philadelphia, Pennsylvania	"Rock Steady"	–	–	–	–
4	Cam Spinks	29	Alabaster, Alabama	"Wave on Wave"	✔	–	–	✔
5	Anders Drerup	36	Ottawa, Canada	"Can't Help Falling in Love"	–	✔	–	–
6	Mandi Castillo	23	San Antonio, Texas	"Así Fue"	✔	✔	✔	✔
7	Kailey Abel	19	Verdigris, Oklahoma	"Forever Young"	–	–	–	✔
8	Tyrone Perkins	68	Marina del Rey, California	"Stormy Monday"	–	–	–	Team full
9	Gigi Hess	22	Lovington, New Mexico	"Lovesong"	✔	–	–	Team full
10	Kevin Farris	33	Arlington Heights, Illinois	"Home" (Note: K. Farris and N. Jonas later performed a snippet of the song "Lovebug" after Farris's audition.)	Team full	✔	✔	Team full
11	Allison Grace	25	Fort Smith, Arkansas	"Don't Know Why"	Team full	Team full	–	Team full
12	Cedrice	28	San Diego, California	"Fever"	Team full	Team full	✔	Team full

== Battles ==
The battles started on March 23. The advisors for this round were Dua Lipa for Team Kelly, Joe and Kevin Jonas for Team Nick, Ella Mai for Team Legend, and Bebe Rexha for Team Blake. The coaches can steal one losing artist from other coaches and save one losing artist on their team. However, the team coach may only hit their button to save an artist after it is clear that no other coach is going to steal the artist. Artists who win their battle or are stolen by another coach advance to the knockouts.

Battles color key
Artist won the battle and advanced to the knockouts
Artist lost the battle but was stolen by another coach and advanced to the knockouts
Artist lost the battle but was saved by their coach and advanced to the four-way knockout
Artist lost the battle and was eliminated

Battles results
Episode	Coach	Order	Winner	Song	Loser	'Steal'/'Save' result			
Episode	Coach	Order	Winner	Song	Loser	Kelly	Nick	John	Blake
Episode 6 (Monday, March 23, 2020)	Blake	1	Joei Fulco	"The Best"	Todd Michael Hall	–	–	–	✔
Episode 6 (Monday, March 23, 2020)	Kelly Clarkson	2	Anaya Cheyenne	"Scared to Be Lonely"	Chelle	–	–	–	–
Episode 6 (Monday, March 23, 2020)	Nick Jonas	3	Roderick Chambers	"When the Party's Over"	Joanna Serenko	–	–	✔	–
Episode 6 (Monday, March 23, 2020)	John Legend	4	Mike Jerel	"Adorn"	Zach Day	–	–	–	–
Episode 6 (Monday, March 23, 2020)	Blake Shelton	5	Levi Watkins	"Counting Stars"	Jamal Corrie	–	–	N/A	N/A
Episode 6 (Monday, March 23, 2020)	Nick Jonas	6	Allegra Miles	"How Will I Know"	Michael Williams	–	✔	N/A	–
Episode 7 (Monday, March 30, 2020)	Blake Shelton	1	Toneisha Harris	"Good as Hell"	Jacob Daniel Murphy	–	–	N/A	N/A
Episode 7 (Monday, March 30, 2020)	Kelly Clarkson	2	Micah Iverson	"Someone You Loved"	Gigi Hess	–	–	N/A	–
Episode 7 (Monday, March 30, 2020)	John Legend	3	Mandi Castillo	"Señorita"	CammWess	✔	–	–	–
Episode 7 (Monday, March 30, 2020)	Blake Shelton	4	Cam Spinks	"What Ifs"	Kailey Abel	N/A	–	N/A	N/A
Episode 7 (Monday, March 30, 2020)	Nick Jonas	5	Tate Brusa	"Circles"	Anders Drerup	N/A	N/A	N/A	–
Episode 7 (Monday, March 30, 2020)	John Legend	6	Darious Lyles	"Come Together"	Nelson Cade III	N/A	–	✔	–
Episode 8 (Monday, April 6, 2020)	Nick Jonas	1	Arei Moon	"Missing You"	Samuel Wilco	N/A	N/A	Team full	–
Episode 8 (Monday, April 6, 2020)	Kelly Clarkson	2	Megan Danielle	"Top of the World"	Samantha Howell	✔	–	Team full	–
Episode 8 (Monday, April 6, 2020)	Blake Shelton	3	Todd Tilghman	"Ghost in This House"	Jon Mullins	Team full	✔	Team full	N/A
Episode 8 (Monday, April 6, 2020)	John Legend	4	Zan Fiskum	"Closer to Fine"	Brittney Allen	Team full	Team full	Team full	–
Episode 8 (Monday, April 6, 2020)	Kelly Clarkson	5	Mandi Thomas	"My Baby Loves Me"	Sara Collins	Team full	Team full	Team full	–
Episode 8 (Monday, April 6, 2020)	Kelly Clarkson	6	Tayler Green	"Water Under the Bridge"	Jules	Team full	Team full	Team full	–
Episode 8 (Monday, April 6, 2020)	Nick Jonas	7	Jacob Miller	"Lights Up"	Kevin Farris	Team full	Team full	Team full	–
Episode 8 (Monday, April 6, 2020)	John Legend	8	Thunderstorm Artis	"Stay"	Cedrice	Team full	Team full	Team full	✔

== Knockouts ==
In the knockouts, each coach can steal one losing artist from another team. Artists who win their knockout or are stolen by another coach advance to the live playoffs. James Taylor served as a mega mentor for all teams in this round.

New this season, each saved artist from the battles will go head-to-head in the first-ever four-way knockout. Results for the four-way knockout are decided by a public vote, with the winner announced during the first week of live shows.

Knockouts color key
Artist won the Knockout and advanced to the live playoffs
Artist lost the knockout but was stolen by another coach and advanced to the live playoffs
Artist lost the knockout and was eliminated

Knockouts results
Episode	Coach	Order	Song	Artists		Song	'Steal' result			
Episode	Coach	Order	Song	Winner	Loser	Song	Kelly	Nick	John	Blake
Episode 9 (Monday, April 13, 2020)	Blake Shelton	1	"When Will I Be Loved"	Joei Fulco	Levi Watkins	"I Ain't Living Long Like This"	–	–	–	N/A
Episode 9 (Monday, April 13, 2020)	Kelly Clarkson	2	"Piece by Piece"	Megan Danielle	CammWess	"Say Something"	N/A	✔	✔	–
Episode 9 (Monday, April 13, 2020)	John Legend	3	"Versace on the Floor"	Mike Jerel	Darious Lyles	"Me and Mrs. Jones"	–	–	Team full	–
Episode 9 (Monday, April 13, 2020)	Nick Jonas	4	"Redbone"	Roderick Chambers	Tate Brusa	"The Scientist"	–	N/A	Team full	–
Episode 9 (Monday, April 13, 2020)	Blake Shelton	5	"Anymore"	Todd Tilghman	Cam Spinks	"Rumor"	–	–	Team full	N/A
Episode 9 (Monday, April 13, 2020)	John Legend	6	"The Story"	Zan Fiskum	Joanna Serenko	"Angel from Montgomery"	–	✔	Team full	✔
Episode 10 (Monday, April 20, 2020)	John Legend	1	"Stand by Me"	Mandi Castillo	Thunderstorm Artis	"Preach"	–	✔	Team full	Team full
Episode 10 (Monday, April 20, 2020)	Nick Jonas	2	"You Don't Know My Name"	Arei Moon	Jon Mullins	"Thinking Out Loud"	–	Team full	Team full	Team full
Episode 10 (Monday, April 20, 2020)	Kelly Clarkson	3	"Graveyard"	Micah Iverson	Tayler Green	"Time After Time"	N/A	Team full	Team full	Team full
Episode 10 (Monday, April 20, 2020)	Nick Jonas	4	"Chandelier"	Allegra Miles	Jacob Miller	"Better Now"	–	Team full	Team full	Team full
Episode 10 (Monday, April 20, 2020)	Kelly Clarkson	5	"My Church"	Mandi Thomas	Anaya Cheyenne	"Praying"	N/A	Team full	Team full	Team full
Episode 10 (Monday, April 20, 2020)	Blake Shelton	6	"Diamonds"	Toneisha Harris	Cedrice	"Love on the Brain"	✔	Team full	Team full	Team full
Episode 10 (Monday, April 20, 2020)	Four-way knockout	7	"You Are The Reason"	Michael Williams	Todd Michael Hall	"Somebody to Love"	No steals allowed			
Episode 10 (Monday, April 20, 2020)	Four-way knockout	7	"You Are The Reason"	Michael Williams	Nelson Cade III	"Best Part"	No steals allowed			
Episode 10 (Monday, April 20, 2020)	Four-way knockout	7	"You Are The Reason"	Michael Williams	Samantha Howell	"Always on My Mind"	No steals allowed			
Episode 11 (Monday, April 27, 2020)		The eleventh episode was a special episode titled "Road to the Live Shows." The episode showed the best moments of the season from the blind auditions to next week's live playoffs, and some unseen footage.								

== Live remote shows ==
This season, the number of weeks of live shows was reduced to three, consisting of the playoffs, semi-final, and the finale.

As a result of the COVID-19 outbreak in the United States, the live shows were changed to remote shows with performances aired pre-recorded performances at the contestants' and coaches' homes. The instant save is done via The Voice Official App in the playoffs and semi-final, continuing the shift from Twitter to the official app that took place in season 17.

Additionally, the artists did not have studio versions of their covers released on iTunes or Apple Music, meaning that for the first time since the introduction in season 3, there were no streaming votes or bonuses awarded. However, the finalists did have studio versions of their original song and coach duet from the finale released, although they did not contribute to the artists' vote tally.

Live shows color key:
Artist was saved by the public's vote
Artist was saved by their coach
Artist competed in the "Wild card" instant save
Artist was placed in the bottom group and competed for an instant save
Artist was instantly saved
Artist was eliminated

=== Week 1: Playoffs (May 4–5) ===
The live playoffs round constituted episodes 12 and 13. For the first time there is a Top 17. On Monday, James Taylor opened the show with a performance with the remaining knockouts artists, followed by the announcement of the four-way knockout's winner. The winner joined the Top 17, who all performed live from their homes using a production kit sent to them. Coaches mentored and gave feedback from their homes: Kelly from Montana, Blake from Oklahoma, and both John and Nick from Los Angeles.

On Tuesday's live episode, one artist from each team advanced based on the country's vote, and each coach got to save one of their own artists. The remaining artists from each team with the highest votes will have a chance to compete for the wild card as seen on season 17. These nine artists advanced to the semi-final.

Live playoffs results
Episode	Coach	Order	Artist	Song	Result
Episode 12 (Monday, May 4, 2020) (Star Wars Day)	Nick Jonas	1	Thunderstorm Artis	"Summertime"	Public's vote
Episode 12 (Monday, May 4, 2020) (Star Wars Day)	Nick Jonas	2	Allegra Miles	"New York State of Mind"	Nick's choice
Episode 12 (Monday, May 4, 2020) (Star Wars Day)	Nick Jonas	3	Arei Moon	"Finesse"	Eliminated
Episode 12 (Monday, May 4, 2020) (Star Wars Day)	Nick Jonas	4	Roderick Chambers	"Lost Without U"	Eliminated
Episode 12 (Monday, May 4, 2020) (Star Wars Day)	Nick Jonas	5	Michael Williams	"Sign of the Times"	Wild card
Episode 12 (Monday, May 4, 2020) (Star Wars Day)	John Legend	6	Zan Fiskum	"Blowin' in the Wind"	John's choice
Episode 12 (Monday, May 4, 2020) (Star Wars Day)	John Legend	7	Mike Jerel	"All My Life"	Eliminated
Episode 12 (Monday, May 4, 2020) (Star Wars Day)	John Legend	8	Mandi Castillo	"¡Corre!"	Wild card
Episode 12 (Monday, May 4, 2020) (Star Wars Day)	John Legend	9	CammWess	"Ain't No Sunshine"	Public's vote
Episode 12 (Monday, May 4, 2020) (Star Wars Day)	Kelly Clarkson	10	Megan Danielle	"Anyone"	Kelly's choice
Episode 12 (Monday, May 4, 2020) (Star Wars Day)	Kelly Clarkson	11	Mandi Thomas	"I Hope You Dance"	Eliminated
Episode 12 (Monday, May 4, 2020) (Star Wars Day)	Kelly Clarkson	12	Micah Iverson	"Your Song"	Public's vote
Episode 12 (Monday, May 4, 2020) (Star Wars Day)	Kelly Clarkson	13	Cedrice	"Everything I Wanted"	Wild card
Episode 12 (Monday, May 4, 2020) (Star Wars Day)	Blake Shelton	14	Toneisha Harris	"Stronger (What Doesn't Kill You)"	Blake's choice
Episode 12 (Monday, May 4, 2020) (Star Wars Day)	Blake Shelton	15	Joei Fulco	"Runaway"	Eliminated
Episode 12 (Monday, May 4, 2020) (Star Wars Day)	Blake Shelton	16	Joanna Serenko	"Rich Girl"	Wild card
Episode 12 (Monday, May 4, 2020) (Star Wars Day)	Blake Shelton	17	Todd Tilghman	"Glory of Love"	Public's vote
Episode 13 (Tuesday, May 5, 2020) (Cinco De Mayo)	Blake Shelton	1	Joanna Serenko	"Don't Let Me Be Lonely Tonight"	Wild card winner
Episode 13 (Tuesday, May 5, 2020) (Cinco De Mayo)	John Legend	2	Mandi Castillo	"True Colors"	Eliminated
Episode 13 (Tuesday, May 5, 2020) (Cinco De Mayo)	Kelly Clarkson	3	Cedrice	"Breathin"	Eliminated
Episode 13 (Tuesday, May 5, 2020) (Cinco De Mayo)	Nick Jonas	4	Michael Williams	"To Love Somebody"	Eliminated

Non-competition performances
Order	Performers	Song
12.1	James Taylor and the Top 20	"Shower the People"

=== Week 2: Semi-final (May 11–12) ===
The semi-final comprised episodes 14 and 15. On Monday, the Top 9 artists performed to the theme of "Dedication Week" with the public vote results being announced on Tuesday. Four artists are eliminated in a new elimination format: one artist from a team with a higher vote will immediately advance to the Top 5, leaving the remaining five artists to compete for the final spot in the finale via instant save.

With the advancement of Thunderstorm Artis to the finale, Nick Jonas became the fifth new coach to successfully coach an artist on his team to the finale on his first attempt as a coach, after Usher (Michelle Chamuel in season 4), Alicia Keys (Wé McDonald in season 11), Kelly Clarkson (Brynn Cartelli in season 14), and John Legend (Maelyn Jarmon in season 16).

Live semi-final results
Episode	Coach	Order	Artist	Song	Result
Episode 14 (Monday, May 11, 2020)	Blake Shelton	1	Joanna Serenko	"Lean On Me"	Not selected
Episode 14 (Monday, May 11, 2020)	Kelly Clarkson	2	Micah Iverson	"I Will Follow You Into the Dark"	Public's vote
Episode 14 (Monday, May 11, 2020)	Blake Shelton	3	Todd Tilghman	"Love, Me"	Public's vote
Episode 14 (Monday, May 11, 2020)	John Legend	4	Zan Fiskum	"Never Be the Same"	Not selected
Episode 14 (Monday, May 11, 2020)	Nick Jonas	5	Thunderstorm Artis	"Home"	Public's vote
Episode 14 (Monday, May 11, 2020)	Kelly Clarkson	6	Megan Danielle	"What Hurts the Most"	Not selected
Episode 14 (Monday, May 11, 2020)	Nick Jonas	7	Allegra Miles	"Overjoyed"	Not selected
Episode 14 (Monday, May 11, 2020)	Blake Shelton	8	Toneisha Harris	"Because You Loved Me"	Not selected
Episode 14 (Monday, May 11, 2020)	John Legend	9	CammWess	"Rainbow"	Public's vote
Episode 15 (Tuesday, May 12, 2020)	Kelly Clarkson	1	Megan Danielle	"Simple Man"	Eliminated
Episode 15 (Tuesday, May 12, 2020)	Nick Jonas	2	Allegra Miles	"In My Blood"	Eliminated
Episode 15 (Tuesday, May 12, 2020)	John Legend	3	Zan Fiskum	"Always Remember Us This Way"	Eliminated
Episode 15 (Tuesday, May 12, 2020)	Blake Shelton	4	Joanna Serenko	"Unaware"	Eliminated
Episode 15 (Tuesday, May 12, 2020)	Blake Shelton	5	Toneisha Harris	"Lovin' You"	Instantly saved

Non-competition performances
Order	Performer(s)	Song
15.1	Top 9 with coaches	"Everyday People"
15.2	Kane Brown	"Cool Again"
15.3	Doja Cat	"Say So"
15.4	James Taylor and Henry Taylor	"Moon River"

=== Week 3: Finale (May 18–19) ===
The finale comprised episodes 16 to 18. The final 5 performed on episode 16, with the final results following on episode 18; meanwhile, episode 17 was a cutdown show. On Monday, each artist performed an original song and a cover, and then performed a duet with their respective coach on Tuesday.

For the first time this season, artists had studio versions of their performances released on iTunes and Apple Music, with each artist's original song and coach duet being released. However, unlike previous seasons, a purchase or stream of these performances did not factor into voting. Todd Tilghman from Team Blake became the first and the only vocalist of the season to reach top 10 on iTunes. His original song's studio recording hit #1 on iTunes Overall Chart and iTunes Country Chart.

With both Tilghman and Harris finishing in top two, this marked the second time in which Shelton's artists have finished in the top two since season 3 (Cassadee Pope and Terry McDermott).

Coach	Artist	Episode 16 (Monday, May 18, 2020)				Episode 18 (Tuesday, May 19, 2020)		Result
Coach	Artist	Order	Solo Song	Order	Original Song	Order	Duet (with Coach)	Result
John Legend	CammWess	1	"Purple Rain"	7	"Save It For Tomorrow"	13	"Rocket Man"	Fourth place
Blake Shelton	Todd Tilghman	2	"I Can Only Imagine"	6	"Long Way Home"	11	"Authority Song"	Winner
Kelly Clarkson	Micah Iverson	8	"Chasing Cars"	3	"Butterflies"	15	"I Run to You"	Fifth place
Nick Jonas	Thunderstorm Artis	10	"What a Wonderful World"	4	"Sedona"	12	"You'll Be in My Heart"	Third place
Blake Shelton	Toneisha Harris	5	"Faithfully"	9	"My Superhero"	14	"Don't Stop"	Runner-up

Non-competition performances
Order	Performer(s)	Song(s)
16.1	Top 5 finalists	"Shine"
18.1	CeeLo Green, Shakira, Bebe Rexha, coaches, and the Top 9	"Let My Love Open the Door"
18.2	Jonas Brothers ft. Karol G	"X"
18.3	John Legend	"Conversations in the Dark" / "All of Me"
18.4	Lady Antebellum	"Champagne Night"
18.5	Blake Shelton and Gwen Stefani	"Nobody but You"
18.6	Kelly Clarkson	"I Dare You"
18.7	Kevin Farris, Lauren Duski, Jacob Maxwell, Alexa Cappelli, Jake Hoot, Mike Jerel, Ricky Duran, and Britton Buchanan	"What the World Needs Now Is Love"
18.8	Nick Jonas	"Until We Meet Again"
18.9	Bon Jovi	"Limitless"

== Elimination chart ==
=== Color key ===
Artist's info

- Team Kelly
- Team Nick
- Team Legend
- Team Blake

Result details

- Winner
- Runner-up
- Third place
- Fourth place
- Fifth place
- Saved by the instant save (via The Voice App)
- Saved by the public
- Saved by their coach
- Saved by Wild card (via The Voice App)
- Eliminated
- Number of performances reached Top 10 on iTunes
- Teams are in 3 or 2 artists
- No artists remaining on his/her team

=== Overall ===
Live remote shows results per week
Artist	Week 1 Playoffs	Week 2 Semi-final	Week 3 Finale
Todd Tilghman	Safe	Safe	Winner
Toneisha Harris	Safe	Safe	Runner-up
Thunderstorm Artis	Safe	Safe	Third place
CammWess	Safe	Safe	Fourth place
Micah Iverson	Safe	Safe	Fifth place
Allegra Miles	Safe	Eliminated	Eliminated (Week 2)
Joanna Serenko	Safe	Eliminated	Eliminated (Week 2)
Megan Danielle	Safe	Eliminated	Eliminated (Week 2)
Zan Fiskum	Safe	Eliminated	Eliminated (Week 2)
Cedrice	Eliminated	Eliminated (Week 1)	
Mandi Castillo	Eliminated	Eliminated (Week 1)	
Michael Williams	Eliminated	Eliminated (Week 1)	
Arei Moon	Eliminated	Eliminated (Week 1)	
Joei Fulco	Eliminated	Eliminated (Week 1)	
Mandi Thomas	Eliminated	Eliminated (Week 1)	
Mike Jerel	Eliminated	Eliminated (Week 1)	
Roderick Chambers	Eliminated	Eliminated (Week 1)	

=== Teams ===
Live remote shows results per team
Artist	Week 1 Playoffs	Week 2 Semi-final	Week 3 Finale
Micah Iverson	Public's vote	Advanced	Fifth place
Megan Danielle	Coach's choice	Eliminated	
Cedrice	Eliminated		
Mandi Thomas	Eliminated		
Thunderstorm Artis	Public's vote	Advanced	Third place
Allegra Miles	Coach's choice	Eliminated	
Michael Williams	Eliminated		
Roderick Chambers	Eliminated		
Arei Moon	Eliminated		
CammWess	Public's vote	Advanced	Fourth place
Zan Fiskum	Coach's choice	Eliminated	
Mandi Castillo	Eliminated		
Mike Jerel	Eliminated		
Todd Tilghman	Public's vote	Advanced	Winner
Toneisha Harris	Coach's choice	Advanced	Runner-up
Joanna Serenko	Public's vote	Eliminated	
Joei Fulco	Eliminated		

Rank	Coach	Top 9	Top 5
1	Blake Shelton	3	2
2	Nick Jonas	2	1
3	John Legend	2	1
4	Kelly Clarkson	2	1

== Ratings ==
Viewership and ratings per episode of The Voice (American TV series) season 18
No.	Title	Air date	Timeslot (ET)	Rating (18–49)	Viewers (millions)
1	"The Blind Auditions Premiere, Part 1"	February 24, 2020	Monday 8:00 p.m.	1.5	8.99
2	"The Blind Auditions Premiere, Part 2"	February 25, 2020	Tuesday 8:00 p.m.	1.4	8.57
3	"The Blind Auditions, Part 3"	March 2, 2020	Monday 8:00 p.m.	1.5	9.00
4	"The Blind Auditions, Part 4"	March 9, 2020	Monday 8:00 p.m.	1.3	8.73
5	"The Blind Auditions, Part 5"	March 16, 2020	Monday 8:00 p.m.	1.8	9.98
6	"The Battles Premiere"	March 23, 2020	Monday 8:00 p.m.	1.7	9.57
7	"The Battles Part 2"	March 30, 2020	Monday 8:00 p.m.	1.7	9.77
8	"The Battles Part 3"	April 6, 2020	Monday 8:00 p.m.	1.5	9.59
9	"The Knockouts Premiere"	April 13, 2020	Monday 8:00 p.m.	1.6	9.84
10	"The Knockouts Part 2"	April 20, 2020	Monday 8:00 p.m.	1.4	9.17
11	"Road To Live Shows"	April 27, 2020	Monday 8:00 p.m.	0.9	6.68
12	"Live Playoffs Top 17 Performances"	May 4, 2020	Monday 8:00 p.m.	1.0	7.37
13	"Live Playoffs Top 17 Results"	May 5, 2020	Tuesday 8:00 p.m.	1.0	7.18
14	"Live Semi-Final Top 9 Performances"	May 11, 2020	Monday 8:00 p.m.	0.9	7.29
15	"Live Semi-Final Top 9 Results"	May 12, 2020	Tuesday 8:00 p.m.	0.9	7.06
16	"Live Finale Top 5 Performances"	May 18, 2020	Monday 8:00 p.m.	1.0	7.63
17	"Live Finale Cutdown Show"	May 19, 2020	Tuesday 8:00 p.m.	0.7	5.16
18	"Live Finale Top 5 Results"	May 19, 2020	Tuesday 9:00 p.m.	0.9	7.54
