= The Long Road Home =

The Long Road Home may refer to:

== Film and television ==
- Long Road Home (film), a 1991 American television film directed by John Korty
- The Long Road Home (film), a 1999 American television film directed by Craig Clyde
- The Long Road Home (miniseries), a 2017 National Geographic Channel docudrama/miniseries
- "The Long Road Home" (Arthur), a television episode

== Literature ==
- The Long Road Home (novel), a 1998 novel by Danielle Steel
- The Dark Tower: The Long Road Home, a 2008 monthly five-issue comic book mini-series
- The Long Road Home: A Story of War and Family, a 2006 book by Martha Raddatz

== Music ==
=== Songs ===
- "Long Road Home", by Caroline Polachek and Oneohtrix Point Never on the 2024 album Desire, I Want To Turn Into You: Everasking Edition
- "Long Road Home", by Oneohtrix Point Never on the 2020 album Magic Oneohtrix Point Never

=== Albums ===
- The Long Road Home (album), a 2005 album by John Fogerty
- The Long Road Home – In Concert, a 2006 DVD and double live album by John Fogerty
- The Long Road Home, a 2017 album by Danny Worsnop
- A Long Road Home, a 2002 album by Mickey Newbury
- Long Road Home (album), a 2014 album by Charlie Simpson

== See also ==
- Long Ride Home, a 1988 novel by W. Michael Gear
- The Long Road Back, a 2004 studio album by Peter Andre
- The Long Voyage Home, a 1940 American drama film directed by John Ford
- Long Walk Home (disambiguation)
- Long Way Home (disambiguation)
- The Road Home (disambiguation)
