= The Voice (American TV series) season 17 =

Season of television series

The Voice
- Season 17
- Promotional poster featuring coaches Clarkson, Legend, Stefani, and Shelton
- Hosted by: Carson Daly
- Coaches: Kelly Clarkson; Gwen Stefani; John Legend; Blake Shelton
- No. of contestants: 48 artists
- Winner: Jake Hoot
- Winning coach: Kelly Clarkson
- Runner-up: Ricky Duran
- No. of episodes: 26

Release
- Original network: NBC
- Original release: September 23 – December 17, 2019

Season chronology
- ← Previous; Season 16 Next → Season 18

The seventeenth season of the American reality television show The Voice premiered on September 23, 2019, on NBC. John Legend, Kelly Clarkson and Blake Shelton returned as coaches for their second, fourth, and seventeenth seasons, respectively. Gwen Stefani, who last coached in the twelfth season in 2017, returned after a four season-hiatus, replacing Adam Levine. With Levine's departure, Shelton serves as the last remaining coach from the show's inaugural season. Meanwhile, Carson Daly returned for his seventeenth season as host.

Jake Hoot was named winner of this season, marking Kelly Clarkson's third win as a coach. Also, Hoot became the second winner in the show’s history to have been a one-chair turn in the Blind Auditions and the first where every coach could turn.

== Coaches and hosts ==
Coaches and Host of The Voice Season 17

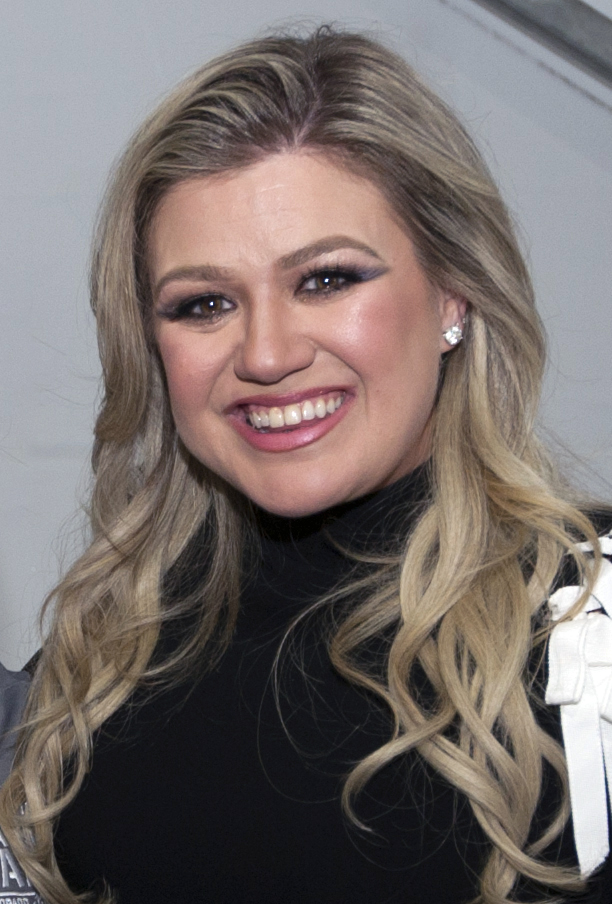
Kelly Clarkson

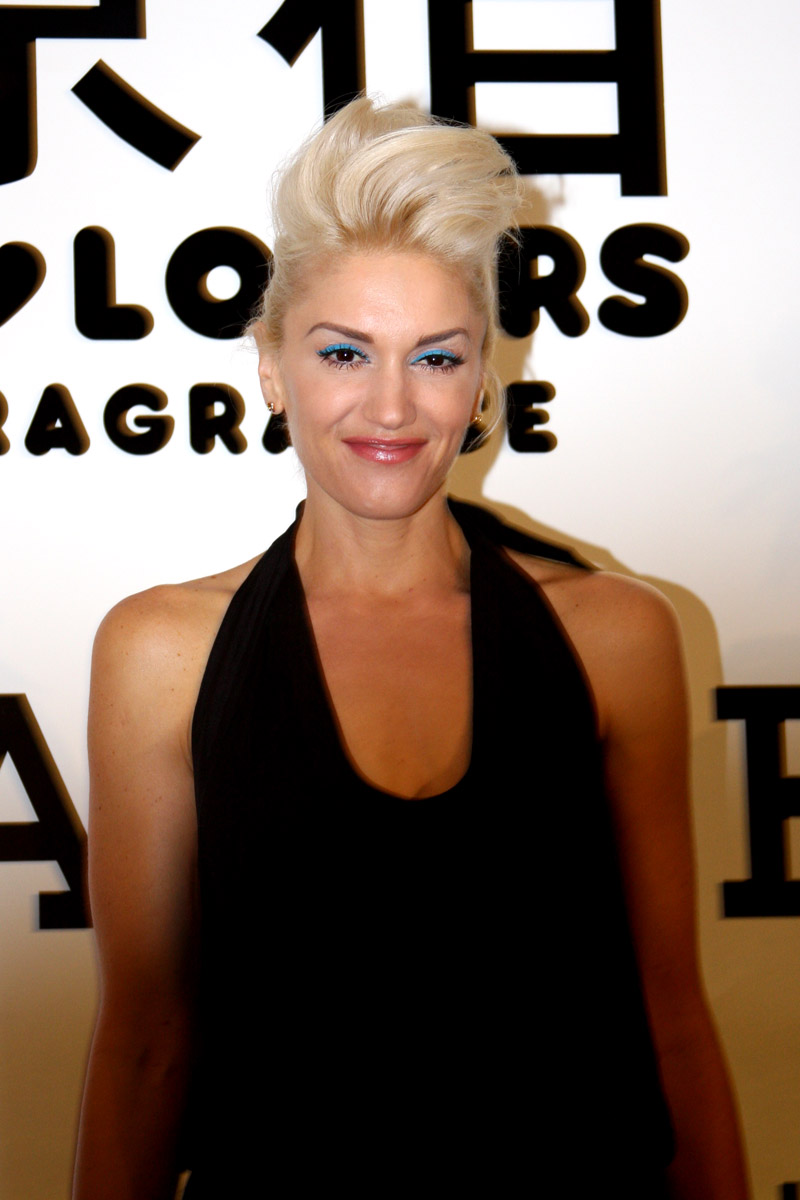
Gwen Stefani

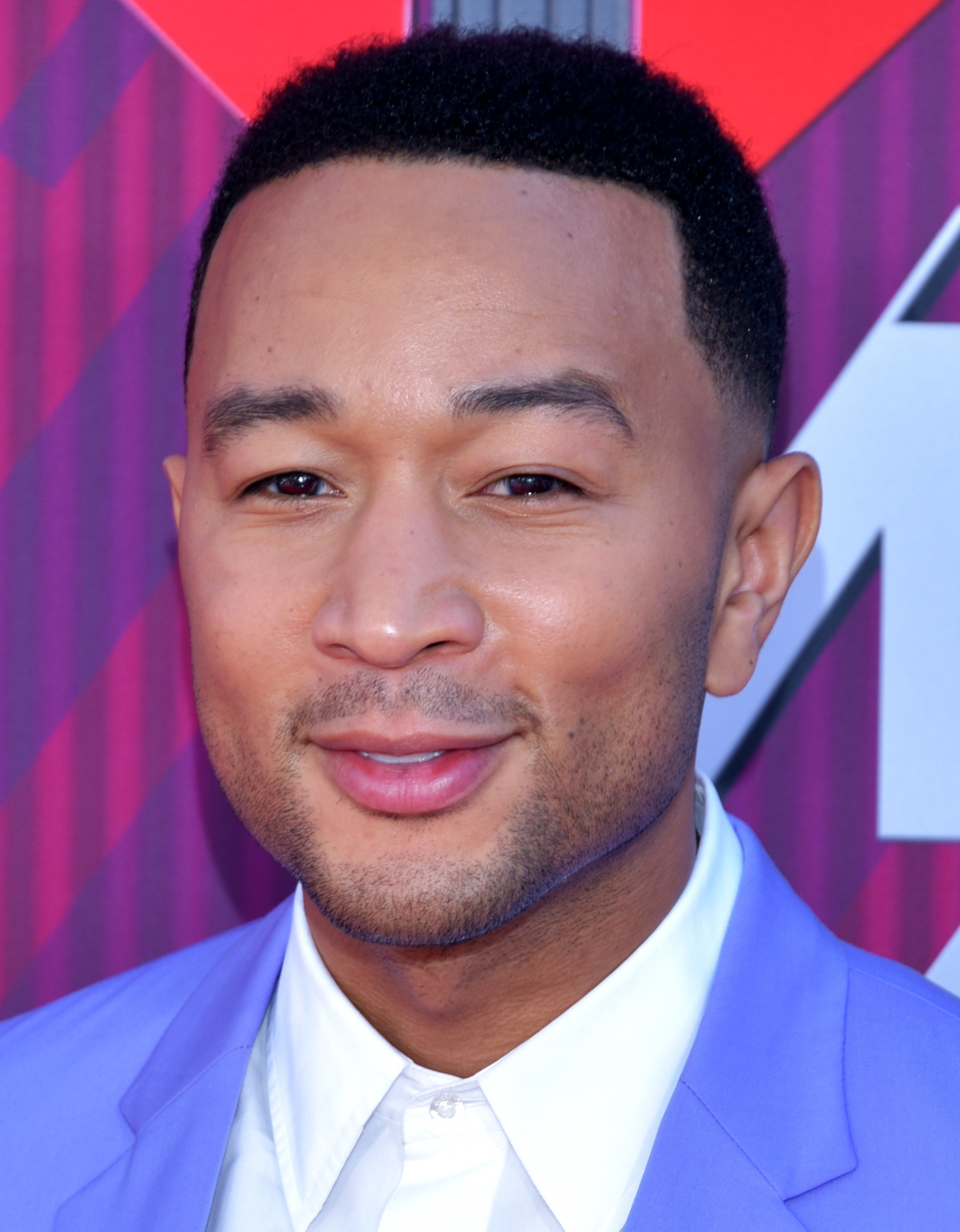
John Legend

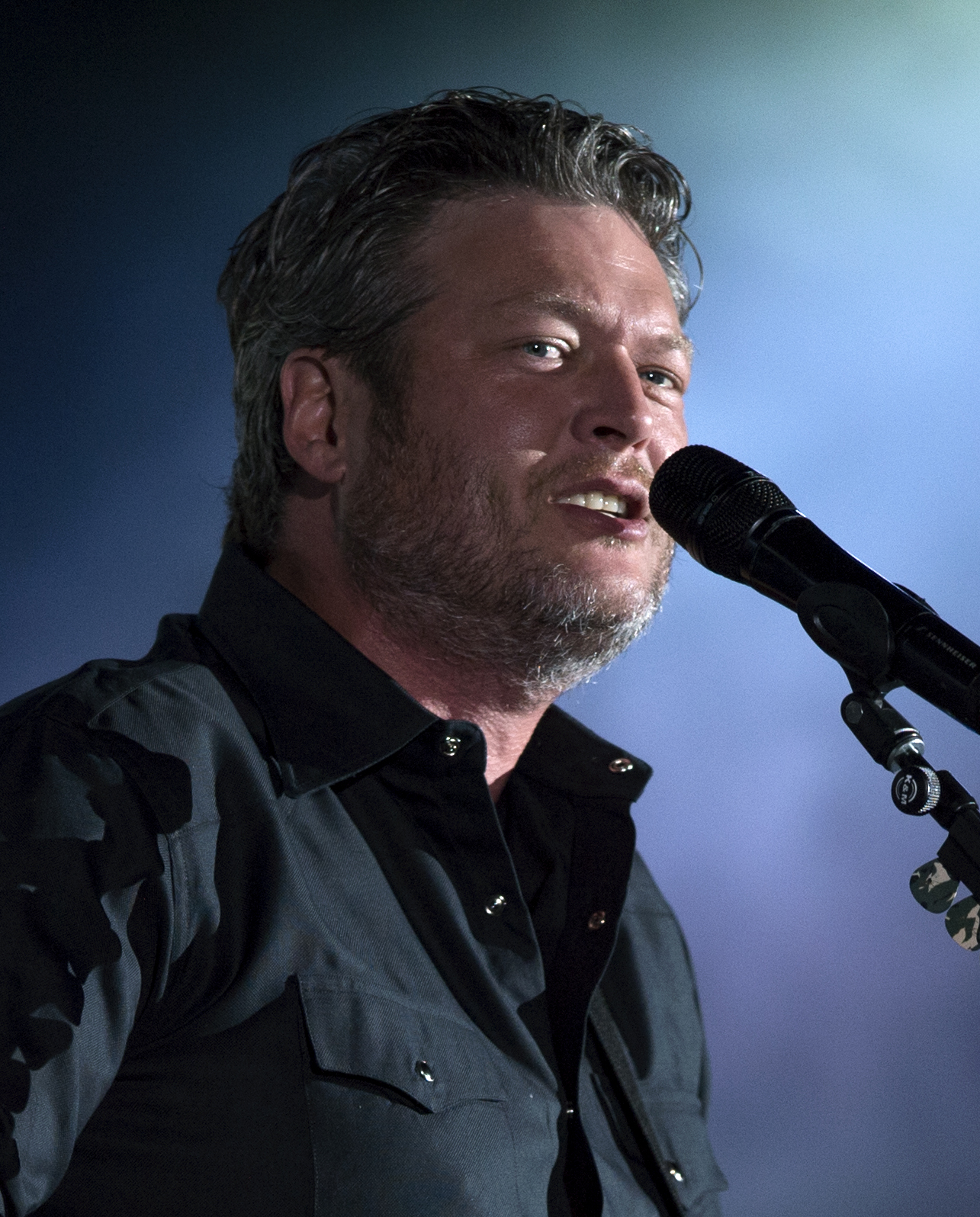
Blake Shelton

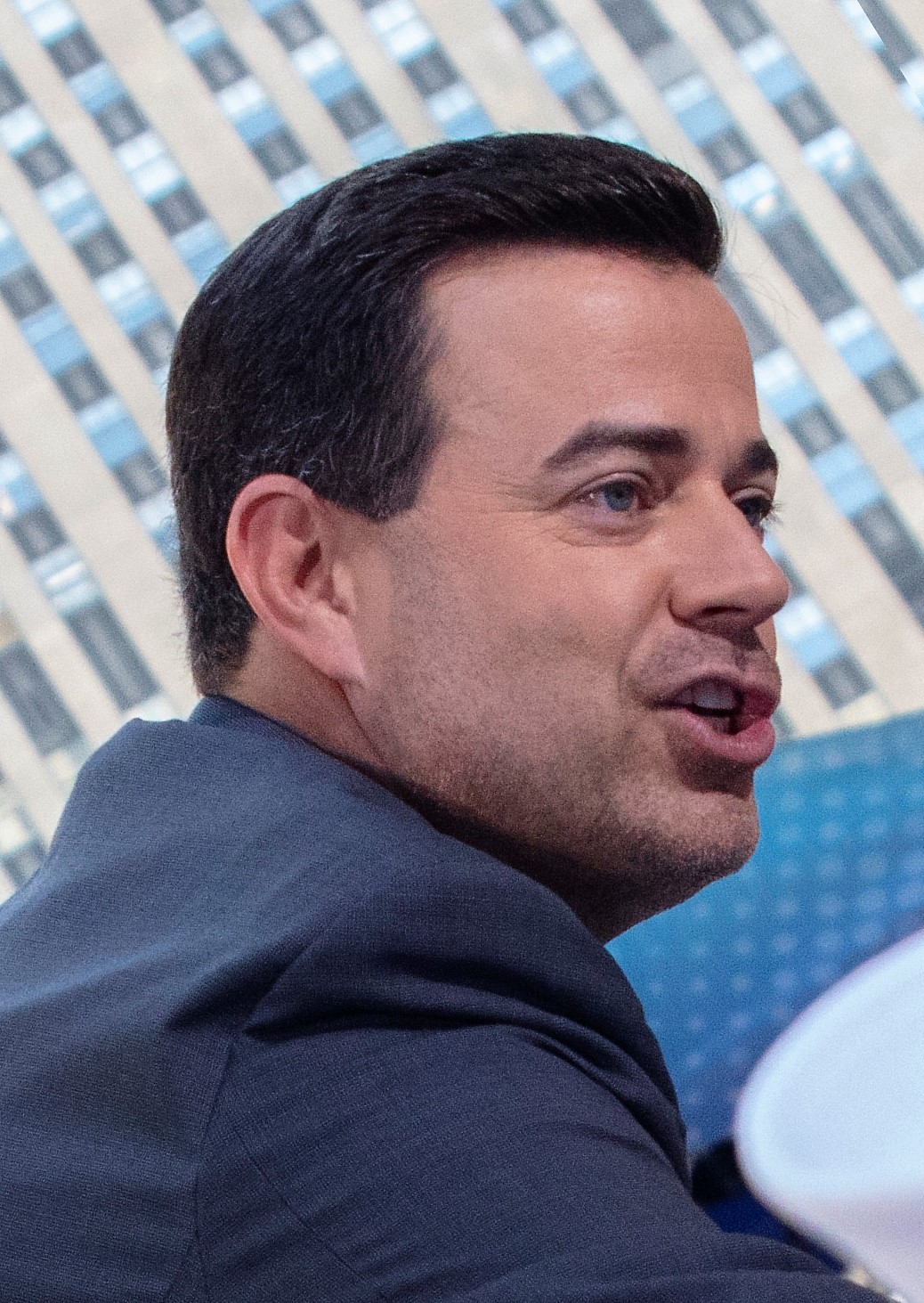
Carson Daly

On May 24, 2019, after having initially opted to return for another season, it was announced that original coach Adam Levine wouldn't be returning as a coach and would be departing from the show after sixteen seasons until season 27. Gwen Stefani replaced Levine, marking her fourth season as a coach. Blake Shelton returned for his seventeenth season as a coach, John Legend for his second, and Kelly Clarkson for her fourth.

The Knockouts, removed in the sixteenth season in favor of the Live Cross Battles round, returned this season, replacing the latter. This season, the coaches went back to having only one Knockout steal instead of a steal and a save. For the first time, the coaches had one steal and one save in the Battles instead of the usual two steals like in the prior seasons. This is the last season to date to have the iTunes bonus multiplier during the live shows.

This season's battle advisors were Normani for Team Kelly, Will.i.am for Team Gwen, Usher for Team Legend, and Darius Rucker for Team Blake.

Taylor Swift served as a “mega-mentor” for all teams during the Knockouts. She had previously mentored in the show's seventh season.

== Teams ==
Color key

- Winner
- Runner-up
- Third place
- Fourth place
- Eliminated in the Live Shows
- Eliminated in the Live Playoffs
- Stolen in the Knockout rounds
- Eliminated in the Knockout rounds
- Stolen in the Battle rounds
- Eliminated in the Battle rounds

Coaches	Top 48 artists				
Kelly Clarkson					
Kelly Clarkson	Jake Hoot	Hello Sunday	Shane Quidditchay	Max Boyle	Damali Gutierrez
Kelly Clarkson	~~Alex Guthrie~~	~~Gracee Shriver~~	Kiara Brown	Melinda Rodriguez	~~Lauren Hall~~
Kelly Clarkson	Injoy Fountain	Steve Knill	Brennan Lassiter	Brooke Stephenson	
Gwen Stefani					
Gwen Stefani	Rose Short	Joana Martinez	Myracle Holloway	Jake HaldenVang	Kyndal Inskeep
Gwen Stefani	Jessie Lawrence	Calvin Lockett	Royce Lovett	Destiny Rayne	~~Kiara Brown~~
Gwen Stefani	~~James Violet~~	Elise Azkoul	Brennen Henson	Caroline Reilly	
John Legend					
John Legend	Katie Kadan	Will Breman	Marybeth Byrd	Alex Guthrie	Khalea Lynee
John Legend	~~Max Boyle~~	Preston C. Howell	Zoe Upkins	James Violet	~~Destiny Rayne~~
John Legend	Dane & Stephanie	Jared Herzog	Mendeleyev Allen-Blitz	Matt New	
Blake Shelton					
Blake Shelton	Ricky Duran	Kat Hammock	Cali Wilson	Gracee Shriver	Ricky Braddy
Blake Shelton	~~Joana Martinez~~	Zach Bridges	Marina Chello	Lauren Hall	Jordan Chase
Blake Shelton	EllieMae Millenkamp	Cory Jackson	Josie Jones	Matthew McQueen	
Note: Italicized names are stolen artists (names struck through within former teams). Underlined names are artists who were saved by their coach in the Battles and advanced to the Knockouts.

== Blind auditions ==
Color key

✔	Coach hit his/her "I WANT YOU" button
	Artist defaulted to this coach's team
	Artist selected to join this coach's team
	Artist was eliminated with no coach pressing their button
✘	Coach pressed "I WANT YOU" button, but was blocked by another coach from getting the artist
	Blocked by Kelly; Blocked by Gwen; Blocked by John; Blocked by Blake

=== Episode 1 (Sept. 23) ===
The coaches are joined by Carson Daly on guitar for an intimate performance of the ‘90s hit "More Than Words" to kick off the season.

Order	Artist	Age	Hometown	Song	Coach's and artist's choices			
Order	Artist	Age	Hometown	Song	Kelly	Gwen	John	Blake
1	Katie Kadan	38	Chicago, Illinois	"Baby I Love You"	✘	✔	✔	✔
2	Jake HaldenVang	24	Charlotte, North Carolina	"Wish I Knew You"	–	✔	✔	✔
3	Jay Miah	30	Tampa, Florida	"Never Enough"	–	–	–	–
4	Brennan Lassiter	20	Dacusville, South Carolina	"You Are My Sunshine"	✔	✔	✔	✔
5	Rose Short	34	Killeen, Texas	"Preach"	✔	✔	–	–
6	Will Breman	25	Santa Barbara, California	"Say You'll Be There" (Note: W. Breman and J. Legend later performed a snippet of the song "Ordinary People" after Breman's audition.)	–	✔	✔	–
7	Alex Guthrie	25	Marietta, Georgia	"Love and Happiness"	✔	✔	–	–
8	Kat Hammock	18	Encinitas, California	"Vienna"	–	✔	–	✔
9	CJ Washington	29	Sacramento, California	"Tired of Being Alone"	–	–	–	–
10	Timmy Hood	19	Lenox Township, Michigan	"Make It Rain"	–	–	–	–
11	Marina Chello	37	Plainview, New York	"Walk Me Home"	✔	–	–	✔
12	Kyndal Inskeep	22	Indianapolis, Indiana	"Never Been to Spain"	✔	✔	–	✘

=== Episode 2 (Sept. 24) ===
Order	Artist	Age	Hometown	Song	Coach's and artist's choices			
Order	Artist	Age	Hometown	Song	Kelly	Gwen	John	Blake
1	Shane Q	28	Sacramento, California	"Tennessee Whiskey"	✔	✔	✔	✔
2	Max Boyle	23	Toledo, Ohio	"Wayfaring Stranger"	✘	–	✔	–
3	Hello Sunday (Myla Finks and Chelsea Grover)	13 & 14	Atlanta, Georgia	"This Is Me"	✔	–	–	–
4	Emily Bass	16	Magnolia, Texas	"Blank Space"	–	–	–	–
5	Royce Lovett	30	Tallahassee, Florida	"911"	–	✔	–	✔
6	Elise Azkoul	28	Atlanta, Georgia	"Million Reasons"	–	✔	–	–
7	Cory Jackson	24	Jonesboro, Arkansas	"Galveston"	✔	✔	–	✔

=== Episode 3 (Sept. 30) ===
Order	Artist	Age	Hometown	Song	Coach's and artist's choices			
Order	Artist	Age	Hometown	Song	Kelly	Gwen	John	Blake
1	Mendeleyev (Mendeleyev Allan-Blitz)	28	Santa Barbara, California	"Girl from the North Country"	✔	✔	✔	✔
2	Jake Hoot	30	Cookeville, Tennessee	"When It Rains It Pours"	✔	–	–	–
3	Calvin Lockett	25	Durham, North Carolina	"Just My Imagination"	–	✔	✔	✔
4	Josie Jones	16	Hamilton, Alabama	"Men and Mascara"	–	–	✔	✔
5	Johnny Sanchez	30	Hollister, California	"Seven Spanish Angels"	–	–	–	–
6	Marybeth Byrd	18	Armorel, Arkansas	"Angel from Montgomery"	✔	✔	✔	✘
7	Tamika J	34	Miami, Florida	"You Got Me"	–	–	–	–
8	Kiara Brown	21	Las Vegas, Nevada	"Free Fallin'"	–	✔	–	✔
9	Melinda Rodriguez	23	Miami, Florida	"What a Wonderful World"	✔	✔	–	–
10	Jon Rizzo	34	Oceanside, New York	"Let Her Cry"	–	–	–	–
11	Cali Wilson	28	Salem, Iowa	"Dreams"	–	✔	✔	✔

=== Episode 4 (Oct. 1) ===
Order	Artist	Age	Hometown	Song	Coach's and artist's choices			
Order	Artist	Age	Hometown	Song	Kelly	Gwen	John	Blake
1	Injoy Fountain	28	Wichita, Kansas	"7 Rings"	✔	✔	–	–
2	Jordan Chase	19	Pensacola, Florida	"Makin' Me Look Good Again"	–	✔	–	✔
3	Dane & Stephanie (Dane and Stephanie Mautone)	21 & 21	Bloomfield, New Jersey	"Angela"	–	–	✔	✔
4	James Violet	20	Syracuse, Utah	"Sweet Creature"	✔	✔	–	✔
5	Jordan McCullough	20	Murfreesboro, Tennessee	"Let Me Love You"	–	–	–	–
6	Preston C. Howell	14	Pembroke Pines, Florida	"Dream a Little Dream of Me"	✔	✔	✔	✔

=== Episode 5 (Oct. 7) ===
Among this episode's auditionees was Ricky Duran, who previously auditioned unsuccessfully in season 6.

Order	Artist	Age	Hometown	Song	Coach's and artist's choices			
Order	Artist	Age	Hometown	Song	Kelly	Gwen	John	Blake
1	Joana Martinez	15	Miami, Florida	"Call Out My Name"	✔	✔	–	✔
2	Brooke Stephenson	28	Bolton, Connecticut	"Let Him Fly"	✔	✔	–	✔
3	Zach Bridges	29	Pearl, Mississippi	"Ol' Red"	–	✔	–	✔
4	Elliemae (EllieMae Millenkamp)	21	Jerome, Idaho	"Merry Go 'Round"	–	–	–	✔
5	Callie Lee	27	Atlanta, Georgia	"No Excuses"	–	–	–	–
6	Jessie Lawrence	31	Newark, New Jersey	"All or Nothing"	–	✔	–	–
7	Brennen Henson	20	Flint, Michigan	"Riptide"	–	✔	–	✔
8	Jared Herzog	21	Niceville, Florida	"Speechless"	–	✔	✔	✔
9	Clayton Cowell	27	Hampton, Virginia	"Just Friends (Sunny)"	–	–	–	–
10	Lauren Hall	25	Chicago, Illinois	"One and Only"	✔	–	–	–
11	Matt New	29	Midland, Texas	"Sunflower"	✔	✔	✔	–
12	Monty Montanaro	N/A	Nashville, Tennessee	"Remedy"	–	–	–	–
13	Ricky Duran	29	Worcester, Massachusetts	"River"	✔	✔	✔	✔

=== Episode 6 (Oct. 8) ===
Order	Artist	Age	Hometown	Song	Coach's and artist's choices			
Order	Artist	Age	Hometown	Song	Kelly	Gwen	John	Blake
1	Myracle Holloway	44	Los Angeles, California	"When I Was Your Man"	–	✔	–	✔
2	Ricky Braddy	36	Nashville, Tennessee	"The Story"	–	✔	✔	✔
3	Damali (Gutierrez)	16	Norwalk, California	"Ocean Eyes"	✔	–	–	–
4	Steve Knill	37	San Francisco, California	"Up to the Mountain"	✔	–	–	–
5	Destiny Rayne	23	Coral Springs, Florida	"Make You Feel My Love"	–	✔	✔	–
6	Jo James	31	Austin, Texas	"It Ain't Over 'til It's Over"	–	–	–	–
7	Khalea Lynee	36	Tampa, Florida	"Best Part"	✔	✔	✔	✔

=== Episode 7 (Oct. 14) ===
Order	Artist	Age	Hometown	Song	Coach's and artist's choices			
Order	Artist	Age	Hometown	Song	Kelly	Gwen	John	Blake
1	Zoe Upkins	16	Nashville, Tennessee	"Angel of Mine"	✔	–	✔	✔
2	Matthew McQueen	21	Georgetown, Texas	"Someone You Loved"	✔	–	Team full	✔
3	Gracee Shriver	16	Owasso, Oklahoma	"Rainbow"	✔	✔	Team full	Team full
4	Ty Mauro	26	Los Angeles, California	"Let's Stay Together"	Team full	–	Team full	Team full
5	Caroline Reilly	16	Cumming, Georgia	"Somebody to Love"	Team full	✔	Team full	Team full

== Battles ==
The second half of "The Voice" episode which aired on October 14 marked the start of the Battle Rounds. The advisors for this round include: Normani for Team Kelly, will.i.am for Team Gwen, Usher for Team Legend, and Darius Rucker for Team Blake. The coaches could steal one losing artist from other coaches and save one losing artist on their team. Artists who won their battle, were saved by their Coach, or were stolen by another coach advanced to the Knockout rounds.

Color key:

Artist won the Battle and advanced to the Knockouts
Artist lost the Battle but was stolen by another coach and advanced to the Knockouts
Artist lost the Battle but was saved by their coach and advanced to the Knockouts
Artist lost the Battle and was eliminated

Episodes	Coach	Order	Winner	Song	Loser	'Steal'/'Save' result			
Episodes	Coach	Order	Winner	Song	Loser	Kelly	Gwen	John	Blake
Episode 7 (Monday, Oct. 14, 2019)	John	1	Khalea Lynee	"The Boy Is Mine"	Zoe Upkins	✔	✔	✔	–
Episode 7 (Monday, Oct. 14, 2019)	Blake	2	Kat Hammock	"Take Me Home, Country Roads"	Josie Jones	–	–	–	N/A
Episode 7 (Monday, Oct. 14, 2019)	Kelly	3	Shane Q	"Too Good at Goodbyes"	Melinda Rodriguez	✔	–	✔	–
Episode 8 (Tuesday, Oct. 15, 2019)	Kelly	1	Alex Guthrie	"Home"	Injoy Fountain	N/A	–	–	–
Episode 8 (Tuesday, Oct. 15, 2019)	Gwen	2	Myracle Holloway	"Breathin"	Elise Azkoul	–	N/A	–	–
Episode 8 (Tuesday, Oct. 15, 2019)	John	3	Max Boyle	"Let Me Love You"	Matt New	–	–	N/A	–
Episode 8 (Tuesday, Oct. 15, 2019)	Blake	4	Cali Wilson	"Miss Me More"	Elliemae	–	–	–	N/A
Episode 8 (Tuesday, Oct. 15, 2019)	John	5	Katie Kadan	"Tiny Dancer"	Destiny Rayne	–	✔	N/A	✔
Episode 9 (Monday, Oct. 21, 2019)	John	1	Will Breman	"Treat You Better"	Jared Herzog	–	–	N/A	–
Episode 9 (Monday, Oct. 21, 2019)	Blake	2	Ricky Duran	"Valerie"	Marina Chello	✔	–	–	✔
Episode 9 (Monday, Oct. 21, 2019)	Kelly	3	Jake Hoot	"Always on My Mind"	Steve Knill	N/A	–	–	–
Episode 9 (Monday, Oct. 21, 2019)	Kelly	4	Gracee Shriver	"Blue Ain't Your Color"	Brennan Lassiter	N/A	–	–	–
Episode 9 (Monday, Oct. 21, 2019)	Kelly	5	Damali	"Set Fire to the Rain"	Brooke Stephenson	N/A	–	–	–
Episode 9 (Monday, Oct. 21, 2019)	Gwen	6	Royce Lovett	"Turn Your Lights Down Low"	Kiara Brown	✔	✔	–	–
Episode 9 (Monday, Oct. 21, 2019)	Blake	7	Joana Martinez	"High Hopes"	Matthew McQueen	Team full	–	–	N/A
Episode 9 (Monday, Oct. 21, 2019)	Gwen	8	Kyndal Inskeep	"I Could Use a Love Song"	James Violet	Team full	✔	✔	–
Episode 10 (Tuesday, Oct. 22, 2019)	Blake	1	Zach Bridges	"Should've Been a Cowboy"	Cory Jackson	Team full	–	Team full	N/A
Episode 10 (Tuesday, Oct. 22, 2019)	John	2	Marybeth Byrd	"Burning House"	Dane & Stephanie	Team full	–	Team full	–
Episode 10 (Tuesday, Oct. 22, 2019)	Gwen	3	Rose Short	"Can't Feel My Face"	Jessie Lawrence	Team full	✔	Team full	✔
Episode 11 (Monday, Oct. 28, 2019)	Gwen	1	Jake HaldenVang	"Just Like a Pill"	Caroline Reilly	Team full	Team full	Team full	–
Episode 11 (Monday, Oct. 28, 2019)	John	2	Preston C. Howell	"Fire and Rain"	Mendeleyev	Team full	Team full	Team full	–
Episode 11 (Monday, Oct. 28, 2019)	Blake	3	Ricky Braddy	"Rumor"	Jordan Chase	Team full	Team full	Team full	N/A
Episode 11 (Monday, Oct. 28, 2019)	Gwen	4	Calvin Lockett	"Yellow"	Brennen Henson	Team full	Team full	Team full	–
Episode 11 (Monday, Oct. 28, 2019)	Kelly	5	Hello Sunday	"Wrecking Ball"	Lauren Hall	Team full	Team full	Team full	✔

== Knockouts ==
The Knockout round started on October 28 after the final battles. The coaches could each steal one losing artist from another team. The Top 20 contestants then moved on to the Live Playoffs. Taylor Swift was the advisor to contestants from all teams in this round.

Color key:

Artist won the Knockout and advanced to the Live Playoffs
Artist lost the Knockout but was stolen by another coach and advanced to the Live Playoffs
Artist lost the Knockout and was eliminated

Episodes	Coach	Order	Song	Artists		Song	'Steal' result			
Episodes	Coach	Order	Song	Winner	Loser	Song	Kelly	Gwen	John	Blake
Episode 11 (Monday, Oct. 28, 2019)	Blake Shelton	1	"Wicked Game"	Cali Wilson	Marina Chello	"I (Who Have Nothing)"	–	–	–	—N/a
Episode 11 (Monday, Oct. 28, 2019)	Kelly Clarkson	2	"Cover Me Up"	Jake Hoot	Melinda Rodriguez	"Always Be My Baby"	—N/a	–	–	–
Episode 11 (Monday, Oct. 28, 2019)	John Legend	3	"Piece of My Heart"	Katie Kadan	Max Boyle	"when the party's over"	✔	✔	—N/a	–
Episode 12 (Tuesday, Oct. 29, 2019)	John Legend	1	"Because You Loved Me"	Khalea Lynee	James Violet	"Stay"	Team full	–	—N/a	–
Episode 12 (Tuesday, Oct. 29, 2019)	Gwen Stefani	2	"Elastic Heart"	Kyndal Inskeep	Jessie Lawrence	"Dancing with a Stranger"	Team full	—N/a	–	–
Episode 12 (Tuesday, Oct. 29, 2019)	Blake Shelton	3	"She Talks To Angels"	Ricky Duran	Joana Martinez	"California Dreamin'"	Team full	✔	–	—N/a
Episode 13 (Monday, Nov. 4, 2019)	Gwen Stefani	1	"Big White Room"	Rose Short	Destiny Rayne	"Tell Me You Love Me"	Team full	Team full	–	–
Episode 13 (Monday, Nov. 4, 2019)	Kelly Clarkson	2	"In Case You Didn't Know"	Shane Q	Kiara Brown	"The Bones"	Team full	Team full	–	–
Episode 13 (Monday, Nov. 4, 2019)	Blake Shelton	3	"Kiss Me"	Kat Hammock	Lauren Hall	"Breakaway"	Team full	Team full	–	—N/a
Episode 13 (Monday, Nov. 4, 2019)	John Legend	4	"I Don't Care"	Will Breman	Zoe Upkins	"Like I'm Gonna Lose You"	Team full	Team full	—N/a	–
Episode 13 (Monday, Nov. 4, 2019)	Gwen Stefani	5	"Powerful"	Jake HaldenVang	Royce Lovett	"Wake Me Up"	Team full	Team full	–	–
Episode 13 (Monday, Nov. 4, 2019)	Kelly Clarkson	6	"Almost Is Never Enough"	Hello Sunday	Alex Guthrie	"I'm Not the Only One"	Team full	Team full	✔	–
Episode 14 (Tuesday, Nov. 5, 2019) (Election)	John Legend	1	"All I Ask"	Marybeth Byrd	Preston C. Howell	"The Way You Look Tonight"	Team full	Team full	Team full	–
Episode 14 (Tuesday, Nov. 5, 2019) (Election)	Blake Shelton	2	"So High"	Ricky Braddy	Zach Bridges	"The Dance"	Team full	Team full	Team full	—N/a
Episode 14 (Tuesday, Nov. 5, 2019) (Election)	Gwen Stefani	3	"Can We Talk"	Myracle Holloway	Calvin Lockett	"You'll Be In My Heart"	Team full	Team full	Team full	–
Episode 14 (Tuesday, Nov. 5, 2019) (Election)	Kelly Clarkson	4	"Sober"	Damali	Gracee Shriver	"Leave the Pieces"	Team full	Team full	Team full	✔

== Live shows ==
Color key:

Artist was saved by the Public's votes
Artist was saved by his/her coach or was placed in the bottom two, bottom three, or middle three
Artist was selected to compete in the Wild Card or won the Wild Card
Artist was saved by the Instant Save
Artist's Apple Music vote multiplied by 5 (except The Finals) after his/her studio version of the song had the most streams of the night
Artist was eliminated

=== Week 1: Live Playoffs (Nov. 11 & 12) ===
The Live Playoffs comprised episodes 15 and 16. For the first time since season 11, there was a Top 20 instead of a Top 24. On Monday, the Top 20 artists performed live for their chance at a spot in the Top 13. On Tuesday, in the live results show, two artists from each team advanced based on America's vote, and each coach got to save one of their own artists; this left one artist per one team - with the fewest votes - to be immediately eliminated. The remaining artists from each team with the highest overnight vote had a chance to compete for the Wild Card similar to season 7 and one artist continued on.

KeIIy Clarkson had four members on her team, for the second time, following the 15th season.

Episode	Coach	Order	Artist	Song	Result
Episode 15 (Monday, Nov. 11, 2019) (Veteran's Day)	Blake Shelton	1	Ricky Duran	"Small Town"	Public's vote
Episode 15 (Monday, Nov. 11, 2019) (Veteran's Day)	Blake Shelton	2	Cali Wilson	"Toxic"	Blake's choice
Episode 15 (Monday, Nov. 11, 2019) (Veteran's Day)	Blake Shelton	3	Gracee Shriver	"American Honey"	Wild Card
Episode 15 (Monday, Nov. 11, 2019) (Veteran's Day)	Blake Shelton	4	Kat Hammock	"God Only Knows"	Public's vote
Episode 15 (Monday, Nov. 11, 2019) (Veteran's Day)	Blake Shelton	5	Ricky Braddy	"Roll with It"	Eliminated
Episode 15 (Monday, Nov. 11, 2019) (Veteran's Day)	Gwen Stefani	6	Rose Short	"What Have You Done for Me Lately"	Public's vote
Episode 15 (Monday, Nov. 11, 2019) (Veteran's Day)	Gwen Stefani	7	Kyndal Inskeep	"10,000 Hours"	Eliminated
Episode 15 (Monday, Nov. 11, 2019) (Veteran's Day)	Gwen Stefani	8	Joana Martinez	"You Can't Stop the Girl"	Public's vote
Episode 15 (Monday, Nov. 11, 2019) (Veteran's Day)	Gwen Stefani	9	Myracle Holloway	"Get Here"	Gwen's choice
Episode 15 (Monday, Nov. 11, 2019) (Veteran's Day)	Gwen Stefani	10	Jake HaldenVang	"Turning Tables"	Wild Card
Episode 15 (Monday, Nov. 11, 2019) (Veteran's Day)	Kelly Clarkson	11	Shane Q	"Can't Take My Eyes Off You"	Kelly's choice
Episode 15 (Monday, Nov. 11, 2019) (Veteran's Day)	Kelly Clarkson	12	Hello Sunday	"Hello"	Wild Card
Episode 15 (Monday, Nov. 11, 2019) (Veteran's Day)	Kelly Clarkson	13	Damali	"You Say"	Eliminated
Episode 15 (Monday, Nov. 11, 2019) (Veteran's Day)	Kelly Clarkson	14	Max Boyle	"Falling Slowly"	Public's vote
Episode 15 (Monday, Nov. 11, 2019) (Veteran's Day)	Kelly Clarkson	15	Jake Hoot	"You Lie"	Public's vote
Episode 15 (Monday, Nov. 11, 2019) (Veteran's Day)	John Legend	16	Khalea Lynee	"Love Like This"	Eliminated
Episode 15 (Monday, Nov. 11, 2019) (Veteran's Day)	John Legend	17	Alex Guthrie	"If I Ain't Got You"	Wild Card
Episode 15 (Monday, Nov. 11, 2019) (Veteran's Day)	John Legend	18	Marybeth Byrd	"Love Me Like You Do"	Public's vote
Episode 15 (Monday, Nov. 11, 2019) (Veteran's Day)	John Legend	19	Will Breman	"Style"	John's choice
Episode 15 (Monday, Nov. 11, 2019) (Veteran's Day)	John Legend	20	Katie Kadan	"Always Remember Us This Way"	Public's vote
Wild Card Performances
Episode 16 (Tuesday, Nov. 12, 2019)	Blake Shelton	1	Gracee Shriver	"Landslide"	Eliminated
Episode 16 (Tuesday, Nov. 12, 2019)	Gwen Stefani	2	Jake HaldenVang	"There's Nothing Holdin' Me Back"	Eliminated
Episode 16 (Tuesday, Nov. 12, 2019)	Kelly Clarkson	3	Hello Sunday	"All By Myself"	Wild Card
Episode 16 (Tuesday, Nov. 12, 2019)	John Legend	4	Alex Guthrie	"Stay"	Eliminated

=== Week 2: Top 13 (Nov. 18 & 19) ===
This week's theme was “Dedications.” The three artists with the fewest votes competed for an Instant Save, with two leaving the competition.

This season, same as the last two seasons, the artist who racked up the most streams on Apple Music during the voting window had their Apple Music votes multiplied by 5.

This week, Jake Hoot was the recipient of the Apple Music Multiplier.

With the elimination of Cali Wilson, this marked the first time since the 7th season that Blake Shelton lost any members of his team prior to the top 11, and the second time out of the past seven seasons in which such an event occurred.

Episode	Coach	Order	Artist	Song	Result
Episode 17 (Monday, Nov. 18, 2019)	Gwen Stefani	1	Joana Martinez	"Get On Your Feet"	Bottom three
Episode 17 (Monday, Nov. 18, 2019)	Blake Shelton	2	Ricky Duran	"You Are the Best Thing"	Public's vote
Episode 17 (Monday, Nov. 18, 2019)	Kelly Clarkson	3	Max Boyle	"Unaware"	Bottom three
Episode 17 (Monday, Nov. 18, 2019)	Gwen Stefani	4	Myracle Holloway	"I'm Your Baby Tonight"	Public's vote
Episode 17 (Monday, Nov. 18, 2019)	John Legend	5	Will Breman	"I Won't Give Up"	Public's vote
Episode 17 (Monday, Nov. 18, 2019)	Blake Shelton	6	Kat Hammock	"Danny Boy"	Public's vote
Episode 17 (Monday, Nov. 18, 2019)	John Legend	7	Katie Kadan	"I'm Going Down"	Public's vote
Episode 17 (Monday, Nov. 18, 2019)	Blake Shelton	8	Cali Wilson	"Butterflies"	Bottom three
Episode 17 (Monday, Nov. 18, 2019)	Kelly Clarkson	9	Shane Q	"My Wish"	Public's vote
Episode 17 (Monday, Nov. 18, 2019)	Kelly Clarkson	10	Hello Sunday	"Mamma Knows Best"	Public's vote
Episode 17 (Monday, Nov. 18, 2019)	John Legend	11	Marybeth Byrd	"Go Rest High on That Mountain"	Public's vote
Episode 17 (Monday, Nov. 18, 2019)	Kelly Clarkson	12	Jake Hoot	"Danny's Song"	Public's vote
Episode 17 (Monday, Nov. 18, 2019)	Gwen Stefani	13	Rose Short	"I Turn to You"	Public's vote
Instant Save Performances
Episode 18 (Tuesday, Nov. 19, 2019)	Blake Shelton	1	Cali Wilson	"The Chain"	Eliminated
Episode 18 (Tuesday, Nov. 19, 2019)	Kelly Clarkson	2	Max Boyle	"Thinking Out Loud"	Eliminated
Episode 18 (Tuesday, Nov. 19, 2019)	Gwen Stefani	3	Joana Martinez	"Superwoman"	Instant Save

Non-competition performances
Order	Performer	Song
18.1	Gwen Stefani and her team (Myracle Holloway, Joana Martinez, & Rose Short)	"Good as Hell"
18.2	Kelly Clarkson and her team (Max Boyle, Hello Sunday, Jake Hoot, & Shane Q)	"Linger"

=== Week 3: Top 11 (Nov. 25 & 26) ===
This week's theme was “Fan Week.” The two artists with the fewest votes competed for an Instant Save, with one leaving the competition.

Once again, the Apple Music multiplier was awarded to Jake Hoot.

Episode	Coach	Order	Artist	Song	Result
Episode 19 (Monday, Nov. 25, 2019)	John Legend	1	Katie Kadan	"Without You"	Public's vote
Episode 19 (Monday, Nov. 25, 2019)	Blake Shelton	2	Kat Hammock	"I'll Fly Away"	Public's vote
Episode 19 (Monday, Nov. 25, 2019)	Kelly Clarkson	3	Shane Q	"Mercy"	Bottom two
Episode 19 (Monday, Nov. 25, 2019)	Gwen Stefani	4	Joana Martinez	"Dreaming of You"	Public's vote
Episode 19 (Monday, Nov. 25, 2019)	John Legend	5	Will Breman	"Light My Fire"	Public's vote
Episode 19 (Monday, Nov. 25, 2019)	Gwen Stefani	6	Rose Short	"Maybe I'm Amazed"	Public's vote
Episode 19 (Monday, Nov. 25, 2019)	Kelly Clarkson	7	Hello Sunday	"The Middle"	Public's vote
Episode 19 (Monday, Nov. 25, 2019)	Gwen Stefani	8	Myracle Holloway	"Everybody Hurts"	Bottom two
Episode 19 (Monday, Nov. 25, 2019)	John Legend	9	Marybeth Byrd	"Stars"	Public's vote
Episode 19 (Monday, Nov. 25, 2019)	Kelly Clarkson	10	Jake Hoot	"Every Light in the House"	Public's vote
Episode 19 (Monday, Nov. 25, 2019)	Blake Shelton	11	Ricky Duran	"Downtown Train"	Public's vote
Instant Save Performances
Episode 20 (Tuesday, Nov. 26, 2019)	Kelly Clarkson	1	Shane Q	"Jealous"	Instant Save
Episode 20 (Tuesday, Nov. 26, 2019)	Gwen Stefani	2	Myracle Holloway	"You Are So Beautiful"	Eliminated

Non-competition performances
Order	Performer	Song
20.1	John Legend and his team (Will Breman, Marybeth Byrd, & Katie Kadan)	"How Deep Is Your Love"
20.2	Gwen Stefani	Album Anniversary: "What You Waiting For?" "Hollaback Girl" "Rich Girl" (with Eve)
20.3	Blake Shelton and his team (Ricky Duran & Kat Hammock)	"Takin' Care of Business"

=== Week 4: Top 10 (Dec. 2 & 3) ===
This week's theme was “Challenge Week.” The three artists with the fewest votes competed for an Instant Save, with two leaving the competition.

Jake Hoot received the Apple Music multiplier for the third week in a row as he confirmed on Instagram.

For the first time this season, the contestants cracked the Top 10 on iTunes. Jake Hoot hit #4 and Katie Kadan hit #8 at the close of the voting window.

Episode	Coach	Order	Artist	Song	Result
Episode 21 (Monday, Dec. 2, 2019)	Gwen Stefani	1	Rose Short	"God's Country"	Public's vote
Episode 21 (Monday, Dec. 2, 2019)	John Legend	2	Marybeth Byrd	"Lose You to Love Me"	Bottom three
Episode 21 (Monday, Dec. 2, 2019)	Blake Shelton	3	Kat Hammock	"You're Still the One"	Public's vote
Episode 21 (Monday, Dec. 2, 2019)	Kelly Clarkson	4	Shane Q	"Caribbean Queen (No More Love on the Run)"	Bottom three
Episode 21 (Monday, Dec. 2, 2019)	Kelly Clarkson	5	Jake Hoot	"That Ain't My Truck"	Public's vote
Episode 21 (Monday, Dec. 2, 2019)	Gwen Stefani	6	Joana Martinez	"Impossible"	Bottom three
Episode 21 (Monday, Dec. 2, 2019)	John Legend	7	Katie Kadan	"Rolling in the Deep"	Public's vote
Episode 21 (Monday, Dec. 2, 2019)	Kelly Clarkson	8	Hello Sunday	"Stone Cold"	Public's vote
Episode 21 (Monday, Dec. 2, 2019)	Blake Shelton	9	Ricky Duran	"Born Under a Bad Sign"	Public's vote
Episode 21 (Monday, Dec. 2, 2019)	John Legend	10	Will Breman	"My Body"	Public's vote
Instant Save Performances
Episode 22 (Tuesday, Dec. 3, 2019)	Kelly Clarkson	1	Shane Q	"Killing Me Softly with His Song"	Eliminated
Episode 22 (Tuesday, Dec. 3, 2019)	Gwen Stefani	2	Joana Martinez	"Somebody That I Used To Know"	Eliminated
Episode 22 (Tuesday, Dec. 3, 2019)	John Legend	3	Marybeth Byrd	"You Are the Reason"	Instant Save

Non-competition performances
Order	Performer	Song
21.1	Kane Brown	"Homesick"
22.1	Kelly Clarkson & John Legend	"Baby, It's Cold Outside"
22.2	Meghan Trainor ft. Mike Sabbath	"Wave"

=== Week 5: Semifinals (Dec. 9 & 10) ===
The Top 8 performed on Monday, December 9, 2019, with the results following on Tuesday, December 10, 2019. Three artists automatically moved on to the finale, the two artists with the fewest votes were immediately eliminated, and the middle three contended for the remaining spot in the finale via the Instant Save.

In addition to their solo song, each artist performed an 80s duet with another contestant.

This week, three artists reached the top 10 on iTunes. Jake Hoot charted at #1, Ricky Duran peaked at #2 and Rose Short hit #7 at the close of the voting window.

With the elimination of Kat Hammock, this was the first time since the 11th season that Blake Shelton did not have two or more artists in the finale. In addition, this was the first time since the 10th season that all four coaches were represented in the finale.

Episode	Coach	Order	Artist	Solo Song	'80s Duet Song	Results
Episode 23 (Monday, Dec. 9, 2019)	John Legend	1 (9)	Katie Kadan	"Lady Marmalade"	"Express Yourself"	Public's vote
Episode 23 (Monday, Dec. 9, 2019)	Blake Shelton	2 (10)	Kat Hammock	"Somewhere Only We Know"	"We Belong"	Middle three
Episode 23 (Monday, Dec. 9, 2019)	John Legend	4 (6)	Marybeth Byrd	"Before He Cheats"	"Up Where We Belong"	Eliminated
Episode 23 (Monday, Dec. 9, 2019)	Kelly Clarkson	5 (10)	Hello Sunday	"Don't You Worry 'Bout a Thing"	"We Belong"	Middle three
Episode 23 (Monday, Dec. 9, 2019)	Blake Shelton	7 (3)	Ricky Duran	"Let It Be"	"Your Love"	Public's vote
Episode 23 (Monday, Dec. 9, 2019)	John Legend	8 (3)	Will Breman	"Locked Out of Heaven"	"Your Love"	Eliminated
Episode 23 (Monday, Dec. 9, 2019)	Gwen Stefani	11 (9)	Rose Short	"I Want To Know What Love Is"	"Express Yourself"	Middle three
Episode 23 (Monday, Dec. 9, 2019)	Kelly Clarkson	12 (6)	Jake Hoot	"Desperado"	"Up Where We Belong"	Public's vote
Instant Save Performances
Episode 24 (Tuesday, Dec. 10, 2019)	Kelly Clarkson	1	Hello Sunday	"Chandelier"		Eliminated
Episode 24 (Tuesday, Dec. 10, 2019)	Blake Shelton	2	Kat Hammock	"You've Got a Friend"		Eliminated
Episode 24 (Tuesday, Dec. 10, 2019)	Gwen Stefani	3	Rose Short	"(You Make Me Feel Like) A Natural Woman"		Instant Save

Non-competition performances
Order	Performer	Song
24.1	Blake Shelton ft. Trace Adkins	"Hell Right"
24.2	Tones and I	"Dance Monkey"
24.3	Kaleb Lee ft. Kelly Clarkson	"I Dream In Southern"

=== Week 6: Finale (Dec. 16 & 17) ===
The final 4 performed on Monday, December 16, 2019, with the final results following on Tuesday, December 17, 2019. Each finalist performed a solo cover song, a holiday-themed duet with their coach, and an original song.

This week, seven of the eight spots on the top of iTunes chart were occupied by The Voice Top 4 when voting ended (Ricky Duran at #1, Jake Hoot at #3, #5, #6 and Katie Kadan at #4, #7). Jake Hoot's semi-final performance reached Top 10 on iTunes one more time at #8. Thus, he had seven songs in the Top 10 of the iTunes Country Singles chart and four songs in the Top 10 on the Overall Singles chart. This is more than any other singer in the history of the show has had in the Top 10 at one time. Hoot’s duet of “Wintersong” with Clarkson climbed as high as #3 on the iTunes Overall Singles chart, making it the highest-charting coach duet in the history of the show.

Coach	Artist	Order	Solo Song	Order	Holiday Duet Song (with Coach)	Order	Original Song	Result
Blake Shelton	Ricky Duran	1	"Runnin' Down a Dream"	5	"Run Rudolph Run"	11	"A Woman Like Her"	Runner-up
Kelly Clarkson	Jake Hoot	9	"Amazed"	7	"Wintersong"	2	"Better Off Without You"	Winner
John Legend	Katie Kadan	10	"I Don't Want to Miss a Thing"	3	"Merry Christmas Baby"	6	"All Better"	Third place
Gwen Stefani	Rose Short	12	"Border Song"	8	"My Gift Is You"	4	"Steamroller"	Fourth place

Non-competition performances
Order	Performer(s)	Song
26.1	Max Boyle, Alex Guthrie, Shane Q, & Will Breman	"Gimme Some Lovin'"
26.2	Lady Antebellum	"What If I Never Get Over You"
26.3	The Black Eyed Peas & J Balvin	"Ritmo (Bad Boys for Life)"
26.4	Adam Lambert & Katie Kadan	"Believe"
26.5	Yolanda Adams & Rose Short	"In the Midst of It All"
26.6	Kat Hammock, Marybeth Byrd, Gracee Shriver, & Cali Wilson	"Neon Moon"
26.7	Dua Lipa	"Don't Start Now"
26.8	Gary Clark Jr. & Ricky Duran	"Pearl Cadillac"
26.9	Maelyn Jarmon	"Have Yourself a Merry Little Christmas"
26.10	Little Big Town & Jake Hoot	"Over Drinking"
26.11	Jennifer Hudson	"Memory"
26.12	Hello Sunday, Myracle Holloway, & Joana Martinez	"You Keep Me Hangin' On"
26.13	Luke Combs	"Even Though I'm Leaving"

== Elimination chart ==
=== Overall ===
Color key
Artist's info

- Team Kelly
- Team Gwen
- Team Legend
- Team Blake

Result details

- Winner
- Runner-up
- Third place
- Fourth place
- Saved by Instant Save (via Voice App)
- Saved by the public
- Saved by his/her coach
- Saved by Wild Card (via Voice App)
- Eliminated

Live Show Results per week
Artists	Week 1 Playoffs	Week 2	Week 3	Week 4	Week 5	Week 6 Finale
Jake Hoot	Safe	Safe	Safe	Safe	Safe	Winner
Ricky Duran	Safe	Safe	Safe	Safe	Safe	Runner-up
Katie Kadan	Safe	Safe	Safe	Safe	Safe	3rd Place
Rose Short	Safe	Safe	Safe	Safe	Safe	4th Place
Kat Hammock	Safe	Safe	Safe	Safe	Eliminated	Eliminated (Week 5)
Hello Sunday	Safe	Safe	Safe	Safe	Eliminated	Eliminated (Week 5)
Will Breman	Safe	Safe	Safe	Safe	Eliminated	Eliminated (Week 5)
Marybeth Byrd	Safe	Safe	Safe	Safe	Eliminated	Eliminated (Week 5)
Joana Martinez	Safe	Safe	Safe	Eliminated	Eliminated (Week 4)	
Shane Q	Safe	Safe	Safe	Eliminated	Eliminated (Week 4)	
Myracle Holloway	Safe	Safe	Eliminated	Eliminated (Week 3)		
Max Boyle	Safe	Eliminated	Eliminated (Week 2)			
Cali Wilson	Safe	Eliminated	Eliminated (Week 2)			
Alex Guthrie	Eliminated	Eliminated (Week 1)				
Jake HaldenVang	Eliminated	Eliminated (Week 1)				
Gracee Shriver	Eliminated	Eliminated (Week 1)				
Ricky Braddy	Eliminated	Eliminated (Week 1)				
Damali	Eliminated	Eliminated (Week 1)				
Kyndal Inskeep	Eliminated	Eliminated (Week 1)				
Khalea Lynee	Eliminated	Eliminated (Week 1)				

=== Teams ===
Color key
Artist's info

- Team Kelly
- Team Gwen
- Team Legend
- Team Blake

Results details

- Winner
- Runner-up
- Third place
- Fourth place
- Eliminated
- Saved by Instant Save (via Voice App)
- Saved by Wild Card (via Voice App)
- Artist had the most streams of the night and received Apple Music bonus that week
- Number of performances reached Top 10 on iTunes
- Teams are in 3 artists
- No artists remaining on his/her team

Artist	Week 1 Playoffs	Week 2	Week 3	Week 4	Week 5	Week 6 Finale
Jake Hoot	Public's vote	Advanced	Advanced	Advanced	Advanced	Winner
Hello Sunday	Public's vote	Advanced	Advanced	Advanced	Eliminated	
Shane Q	Coach's choice	Advanced	Advanced	Eliminated		
Max Boyle	Public's vote	Eliminated				
Damali Gutierrez	Eliminated					
Rose Short	Public's vote	Advanced	Advanced	Advanced	Advanced	Fourth place
Joana Martinez	Public's vote	Advanced	Advanced	Eliminated		
Myracle Holloway	Coach's choice	Advanced	Eliminated			
Jake HaldenVang	Eliminated					
Kyndal Inskeep	Eliminated					
Katie Kadan	Public's vote	Advanced	Advanced	Advanced	Advanced	Third place
Will Breman	Coach's choice	Advanced	Advanced	Advanced	Eliminated	
Marybeth Byrd	Public's vote	Advanced	Advanced	Advanced	Eliminated	
Alex Guthrie	Eliminated					
Khalea Lynee	Eliminated					
Ricky Duran	Public's vote	Advanced	Advanced	Advanced	Advanced	Runner-up
Kat Hammock	Public's vote	Advanced	Advanced	Advanced	Eliminated	
Cali Wilson	Coach's choice	Eliminated				
Gracee Shriver	Eliminated					
Ricky Braddy	Eliminated					

Rank	Coach	Top 13	Top 11	Top 10	Top 8	Top 6	Top 4
1	Kelly Clarkson	4	3	3	2	2	1
2	Blake Shelton	3	2	2	2	2	1
3	John Legend	3	3	3	3	1	1
4	Gwen Stefani	3	3	2	1	1	1

== Artists who appeared on other shows or previous seasons ==
- Jessie Lawrence was on season 12 of American Idol and was eliminated in the Group Round of Hollywood Week.
- Ricky Braddy was on season 8 of American Idol and was eliminated in the Top 17.
- Jordan Chase appeared on season 20 of American Idol and made it to the Showstoppers Round.
- Marybeth Byrd appeared on season 21 of American Idol and made the Top 10.
- Kyndal Inskeep and Jordan McCullough, the latter of whom failed to turn a chair, both appeared on season 24 of American Idol. Kyndal made it to the Top 9, while Jordan became that season’s runner-up.

== Ratings ==
Viewership and ratings per episode of The Voice (American TV series) season 17
No.	Title	Air date	Timeslot (ET)	Rating/share (18–49)	Viewers (millions)
1	"The Blind Auditions Premiere, Part 1"	September 23, 2019	Monday 8:00 p.m.	1.7/8	8.93
2	"The Blind Auditions Premiere, Part 2"	September 24, 2019	Tuesday 8:00 p.m.	1.6/8	8.12
3	"The Blind Auditions, Part 3"	September 30, 2019	Monday 8:00 p.m.	1.5/7	8.94
4	"The Blind Auditions, Part 4"	October 1, 2019	Tuesday 8:00 p.m.	1.6/8	9.09
5	"The Blind Auditions, Part 5"	October 7, 2019	Monday 8:00 p.m.	1.5/7	8.42
6	"The Blind Auditions, Part 6"	October 8, 2019	Tuesday 8:00 p.m.	1.5/8	8.14
7	"The Blinds End / The Battles Begin"	October 14, 2019	Monday 8:00 p.m.	1.4/6	7.46
8	"The Battles, Part 2"	October 15, 2019	Tuesday 8:00 p.m.	1.3/6	7.95
9	"The Battles, Part 3"	October 21, 2019	Monday 8:00 p.m.	1.3/6	8.04
10	"The Battles, Part 4"	October 22, 2019	Tuesday 8:00 p.m.	1.3/6	9.07
11	"The Battles, Part 5 / The Knockouts Premiere"	October 28, 2019	Monday 8:00 p.m.	1.5/6	8.88
12	"The Knockouts Premiere, Part 2"	October 29, 2019	Tuesday 8:00 p.m.	1.2/6	7.34
13	"The Knockouts, Part 3"	November 4, 2019	Monday 8:00 p.m.	1.3/6	7.98
14	"The Knockouts, Part 4"	November 5, 2019	Tuesday 8:00 p.m.	1.3/6	8.65
15	"Live Playoffs Top 20"	November 11, 2019	Monday 8:00 p.m.	1.2/5	7.53
16	"Live Playoffs Top 20 Eliminations"	November 12, 2019	Tuesday 8:00 p.m.	1.3/6	7.50
17	"Live Top 13 Performances"	November 18, 2019	Monday 8:00 p.m.	1.2/5	7.68
18	"Live Top 13 Eliminations"	November 19, 2019	Tuesday 8:00 p.m.	1.3/7	8.25
19	"Live Top 11 Performances"	November 25, 2019	Monday 8:00 p.m.	1.1/5	7.33
20	"Live Top 11 Eliminations"	November 26, 2019	Tuesday 8:00 p.m.	1.1/6	7.87
21	"Live Top 10 Performances"	December 2, 2019	Monday 8:00 p.m.	1.1/5	8.03
22	"Live Top 10 Eliminations"	December 3, 2019	Tuesday 9:00 p.m.	1.0/5	6.44
23	"Live Top 8 Semi-Final Performances"	December 9, 2019	Monday 8:00 p.m.	1.2/5	8.22
24	"Live Top 8 Semi-Final EIiminations"	December 10, 2019	Tuesday 9:00 p.m.	1.2/6	8.31
25	"Live Finale, Part 1"	December 16, 2019	Monday 8:00 p.m.	1.2/6	8.80
26	"Live Finale, Part 2"	December 17, 2019	Tuesday 9:00 p.m.	1.3/7	8.66
