= Long Way Home =

Long Way Home may refer to:

== Film and television ==
- A Long Way Home (1981 film), an American television film directed by Robert Markowitz
- The Long Way Home (1985 film), starring Richard Moir
- The Long Way Home (1989 film), a documentary directed by Michael Apted
- The Long Way Home, a 1995 Irish drama film directed by Paddy Breathnach
- The Long Way Home (1997 film), a documentary directed by Mark Jonathan Harris
- The Long Way Home, a 1998 television film directed by Glenn Jordan and starring Jack Lemmon
- The Long Way Home (2013 film), a Turkish drama film
- The Long Way Home (2015 film), a South Korean war film
- Long Way Home (2018 film), a Brazilian drama film
- Long Way Home (2025 TV series), a TV series starring Ewan McGregor and Charley Boorman

== Literature ==
- A Long Way Home (book), a 2013 autobiography by Saroo Brierley
- The Long Way Home (novel) or Keepers of the House, a 1982 novel by Lisa St Aubin de Terán
- The Long Way Home (Buffy comic), a Buffy the Vampire Slayer comic book series
- The Long Way Home, a novel by Poul Anderson

== Music ==
=== Albums ===
- Long Way Home (Dokken album), 2002
- Long Way Home (Jamie Miller album), 2024
- Long Way Home (Låpsley album), 2016
- Long Way Home (Ray LaMontagne album), 2024
- Long Way Home (Stella Lefty album), 2026
- Long Way Home (Troy Cassar-Daley album), 2002
- Long Way Home, by Ginny Owens, 2006
- A Long Way Home (album) by Dwight Yoakam, 1998
- The Long Way Home (Confession album), 2011
- The Long Way Home (Krept and Konan album), 2015
- The Long Way Home (Show of Hands album), 2016
- The Long Way Home (Terri Clark album), 2009
- The Long Way Home, by Donots, 2010
- The Long Way Home, by Jarvis Church, 2008

=== Songs ===
- "Long Way Home" (Steven Curtis Chapman song), 2012
- "Long Way Home", by 5 Seconds of Summer from 5 Seconds of Summer, 2014
- "Long Way Home", by ATB from Addicted to Music, 2003
- "Long Way Home", by Don Henley from I Can't Stand Still, 1982
- "Long Way Home", by Hayes Carll from Little Rock, 2005
- "Long Way Home", by the Monkees from Pool It!, 1987
- "Long Way Home", by the Offspring from Splinter, 2003
- "Long Way Home", by Soul Asylum from Made to Be Broken, 1986
- "Long Way Home", by Stone Temple Pilots from Shangri-La Dee Da, 2001
- "Long Way Home", by Tom Waits from the CD set Orphans: Brawlers, Bawlers & Bastards, 2006
- "Long Way Home", by Toni Braxton from Libra, 2005
- "Long Way Home", by Todd Tilghman as his winning song in season 18 of the American The Voice, 2020
- "The Long Way Home", by the Birthday Massacre from Hide and Seek, 2012
- "The Long Way Home," by Bob Seger and the Silver Bullet Band from The Fire Inside, 1991
- "The Long Way Home", by Mary Chapin Carpenter from Time* Sex* Love*, 2001
- "The Long Way Home", by Neil Diamond Thank the Lord for the Night Time, 1967
- "The Long Way Home", by Norah Jones from Feels like Home, 2004

== Games ==
- The Long Way Home (Traveller), an adventure for the role-playing game Traveller published 1996

== See also ==
- Take the Long Way Home (disambiguation)
- Long Way from Home (disambiguation)
- Long Walk Home (disambiguation)
