= Long Walk Home (disambiguation) =

"Long Walk Home" is a Bruce Springsteen song.

Long Walk Home may also refer to:

- "Long Walk Home", a song by The City Harmonic from their 2013 album Heart
- Long Walk Home: Music from the Rabbit-Proof Fence, the third soundtrack and twelfth album overall released by Peter Gabriel
- The Long Walk Home, a 1990 American historical drama film
- Long Walk Home (Blind album), 2001
- "The Long Walk Home" is a special episode of British soap Hollyoaks (series 31, episode 227) where a woman is violently attacked on her way home from a night out.

== See also ==
- Long Ride Home, a 1988 novel by W. Michael Gear
- Long Walk Hurdle, a Grade 1 National Hunt hurdle race in Great Britain
- Long Way Home (disambiguation)
- The Long Road Home (disambiguation)
- The Long Voyage Home, a 1940 American drama film
