= The Road Home =

The Road Home may refer to:

== Media ==
- Babylon 5: The Road Home, a 2023 American animated film
- Bruce Wayne: The Road Home, a month-long event comic published by DC Comics in December 2010
- The Road Home (1999 film), Chinese romantic drama directed by Zhang Yimou
- The Road Home (upcoming film), an American biographical drama
- The Road Home (novel), a 2007 book by Rose Tremain

=== Music ===
- The Road Home (Heart album), a live album released in 1995
- The Road Home (Jordan Rudess album), a cover album released in 2007
- "The Road Home", the eighth song on Travis Tritt's 1990 studio album Country Club

=== Television ===
- The Road Home (American TV series), a family drama created by Bruce Paltrow and John Tinker
- The Road Home (South Korean TV series), a daily drama
- "The Road Home", a seventh-season episode of the animated mecha series Voltron: Legendary Defender
- "The Road Home", the 2-part series finale of La Brea

== Other ==
- Road Home, a US government program housing-funding program for Louisianans affected by Hurricanes Katrina and Rita

== See also ==
- The Long Road Home (disambiguation)
- The Road Back Home (disambiguation)
- The Road from Home, a non-fiction book written by David Kherdian
