= Take the Long Way Home =

Take the Long Way Home may refer to:

== Songs ==
- "Take the Long Way Home" (John Schneider song), a song by John Schneider
- "Take the Long Way Home" (Supertramp song), a song by Supertramp
- "Take the Long Way Home", a song from the album Sunday 8PM by Faithless

== Other uses ==
- Take the Long Way Home—Live in Montreal, a musical DVD by Roger Hodgson

== See also ==
- Long Way Home (disambiguation)
