= Todd Tilghman =

American country singer

- Born: January 3, 1978 (age 48); Meridian, Mississippi, U.S.
- Genres: Country; Classic rock; Christian; Gospel
- Occupations: Singer, pastor
- Instrument: Vocals
- Years active: 2020–present

Todd Tilghman (born January 3, 1978) is an American pastor singer. He is the winner of season 18 of American talent competition The Voice. At the age of 42, he became the oldest winner in the series history, a record previously held by Josh Kaufman. He competed on the team coached by Blake Shelton, giving Shelton his seventh win as a coach on the show.

== Personal life ==
Tilghman has been singing in church since he was eight years old. He is married to his high school sweetheart, Brooke, and is the father of eight children. Since 2011, he has been the lead pastor of Cornerstone Church in Meridian. Tilghman's eldest son, Eagan Tilghman, was a contestant on NBC's Making It.

== The Voice (2020) ==
Tilghman auditioned for the 18th season of The Voice with the song "We've Got Tonight".

The performances of Tilghman were:

Stage	Date	Song	Original Artist	Order	Result
Blind Auditions	Feb. 24, 2020	"We've Got Tonight"	Bob Seger	1.1	All four chairs turned; Joined Team Blake
Battles (Top 40)	April 6, 2020	"Ghost in This House" (vs. Jon Mullins)	Shenandoah	8.3	Saved by Blake
Knockouts (Top 28)	April 13, 2020	"Anymore" (vs. Cam Spinks)	Travis Tritt	9.5	Saved by Blake
Live Playoffs (Top 17)	May 4, 2020	"Glory of Love"	Peter Cetera	12.17	Saved by Public
Live Semi-finals (Top 9)	May 11, 2020	"Love, Me"	Collin Raye	14.3	Saved by Public
Live Finale (Final 5)	May 18, 2020	"I Can Only Imagine"	MercyMe	16.2	Winner
Live Finale (Final 5)	May 18, 2020	"Long Way Home" (original song)	Todd Tilghman	16.6	Winner
Live Finale (Final 5)	May 19, 2020	"Authority Song" (with Blake Shelton)	John Mellencamp	18.11	Winner

== Awards and recognition ==
On May 23, 2020 an entire advertising section of the Meridian Star was devoted to him. It includes tributes by various local businesses, colleges and individuals including Meridian native Sela Ward.

A drive-through parade honoring Tilghman was scheduled for Thursday evening, May 28, 2020. The parade began at the Meridian Police Department on 22nd Avenue where participants driving vehicles with decorations honoring his win on "The Voice" drove toward Dumont Plaza, where Tilghman and his family were stationed. The event was hosted by the East Mississippi Business Development Corporation; Visit Meridian; and the City of Meridian.

== Discography ==
=== Singles ===
Year	Single	Peak positions	Album
Year	Single	US	Album
2020	"Long Way Home"	–	Non-album releases by The Voice
2020	"Authority Song" with Blake Shelton	–	Non-album releases by The Voice

Awards and achievements
Preceded by Jake Hoot	The Voice (American); Winner; 2020 (Spring)	Succeeded by Carter Rubin
Preceded by "Better Off Without You"	The Voice (American); Winner's song "Long Way Home"; 2020 (Spring)	Succeeded by "Up From Here"
