= Zan Fiskum =

American folk-pop singer-songwriter

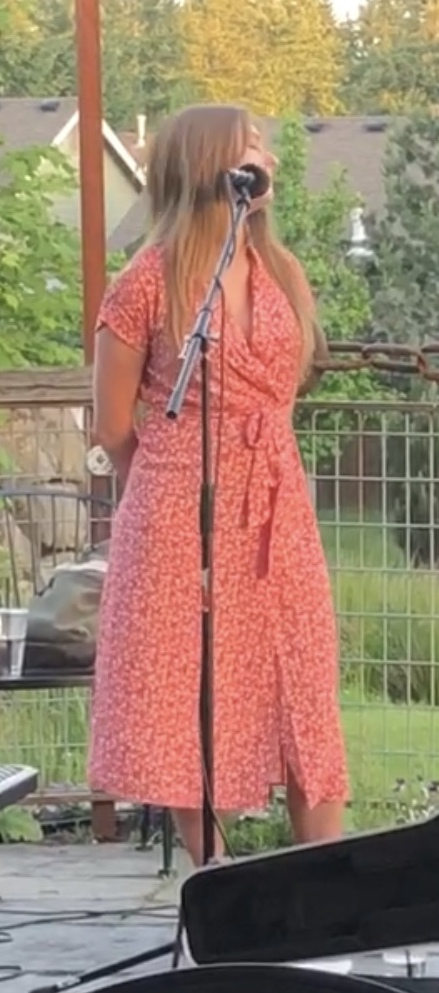
- Fiskum in 2022

Background information
- Born: Suzannah Fiskum; October 28, 1996 (age 29); Maple Valley, Washington, U.S.
- Instruments: Piano, guitar
- Website: zanmusic.net

Suzannah Fiskum, known professionally as Zan Fiskum, is an American folk-pop singer and songwriter. Fiskum is known for her time on The Voice in Season 18 where she was a Top 9 finalist.

== Early life ==
Fiskum was born and raised in Maple Valley, Washington. Her mother is a piano teacher, which led her children to become involved in music.

Throughout her adolescence Fiskum became involved in plays and musicals. To her parents surprise she was comfortable and expressive on stage though offstage she was shy. Fiskum graduated from Tahoma High School in 2015.

After high school Fiskum moved to Lakeland, Florida, where she studied music at Southeastern University.

== The Voice ==
Fiskum was a contestant of The Voice, Season 18. Her first performance resulted in high praise from all the judges. Three of the four judges turned their chair after she sang “Light on” by Maggie Rogers. Fiskum ultimately chose John Legend's team. She was eliminated after reaching the Top 9. Fiskum performed her final performance virtually due to the COVID-19 pandemic in her renovated RV.

=== Performances ===
- Audition: "Light On" by Maggie Rogers
- Battle Round: "Closer to Fine" by Indigo Girls
  - Duet with Brittany Allen
- Knockout: "The Story" by Brandi Carlile
- Top 17: "Blowin' in the Wind" by Bob Dylan
- Top 9: "Never Be the Same" by Camila Cabello
- Instant Save: "Always Remember Us This Way" by Lady Gaga

== Career ==
After moving back to Washington, Fiskum released multiple singles before releasing her debut album, Sleeping Problems, on April 28, 2021. Fiskum was awarded a Sonic Guild grant in 2021.

She has performed on tour with Legend and Dave Matthews.

Fiskum has been vocal about the effect of the COVID-19 pandemic on artists and continues to be an advocate for all musicians to keep making music despite the challenges of live performing. Currently, Fiskum continues to perform at the mercy of COVID-19 restrictions.

== Discography ==
=== Albums ===
- Sleeping Problems (2020)

=== Singles ===
- “You Are The Light”
- “White Christmas”
- “Still Thinking About You"
- “Because He Lives”
- “Made to Worship”
- “You Take Care of Me”
- “Our Humanity”
- “I Found a Hope”
- “How Can I"
