= Maelyn Jarmon =

American singer (born 1992)

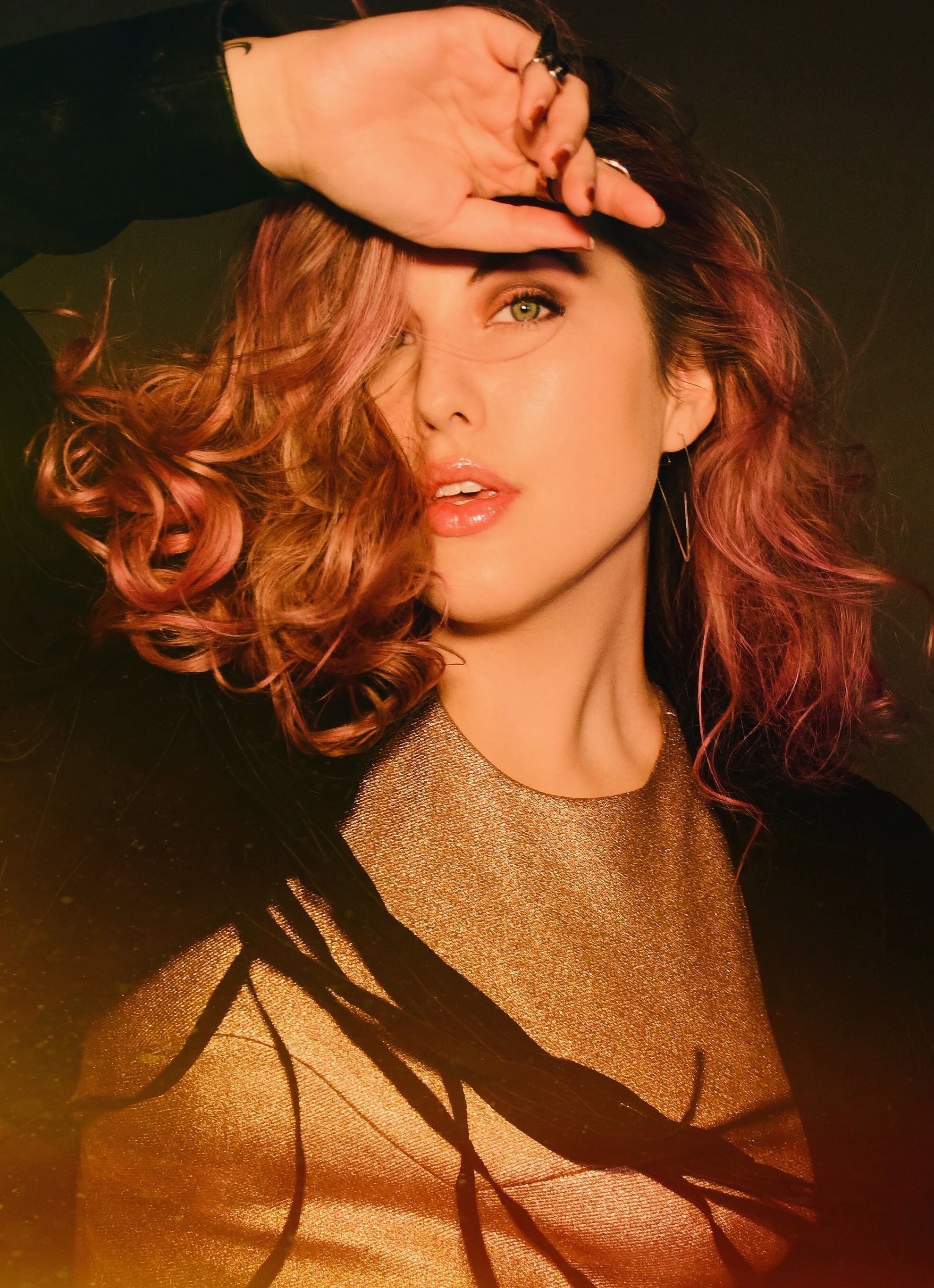

Background information
- Born: December 8, 1992 (age 33); Frisco, Texas, U.S.
- Genres: Pop, indie, alternative, folk
- Occupation: Singer
- Years active: 2019–present
- Label: Republic
- Website: maelynmusic.com

Maelyn Jarmon (born December 8, 1992) is an American folk singer. She is the winner of season 16 of the American talent competition The Voice at the age of 26. She competed on the team coached by John Legend, giving him his first win as a coach on the show. After winning the show, she was signed to Republic Records.

== Career ==
In 2019, Maelyn Jarmon entered the 16th season of The Voice. For her blind audition, she sang "Fields of Gold" by Sting. Adam Levine, John Legend, Kelly Clarkson and Blake Shelton turned, and she chose to be a part of Team Legend. She made it to the finale and was announced as the winner on May 21, 2019. On July 4, 2019, she sang the national anthem at A Capitol Fourth.

== Personal life ==
Maelyn grew up in Frisco, TX and lived in NYC for 9 years before receiving an invitation to audition for Season 16 of The Voice.

=== The Voice (2019) ===
– Studio version of performance was the most streamed song on Apple Music

==== The Voice performances ====
Stage	Song	Original artist	Order	Result
Blind Audition	"Fields of Gold"	Sting	1.2	Adam Levine, John Legend, Kelly Clarkson and Blake Shelton turned, joined Team Legend
Battles (Top 48)	"When We Were Young" (vs. Savannah Brister)	Adele	8.5	Saved by John Legend
Live Cross Battles (Top 32)	"Mad World" (vs. Rod Stokes)	Tears for Fears	13.8	Saved by Public
Live Playoffs (Top 24)	"Fallingwater"	Maggie Rogers	16.11	Saved by Public
Live Top 13	"The Scientist"	Coldplay	18.13	Saved by Public
Live Semifinals (Top 8)	"Yesterday" (duet with Rod Stokes)	The Beatles	20.2	Saved by Public
Live Semifinals (Top 8)	"Stay"	Rihanna feat. Mikky Ekko	20.6	Saved by Public
Live Finale (Final 4)	"Unforgettable" with (John Legend)	Nat King Cole	22.6	Winner
Live Finale (Final 4)	"Wait for You" (original song)	Maelyn Jarmon	22.1	Winner
Live Finale (Final 4)	"Hallelujah"	Leonard Cohen	22.12	Winner

Non competition performances
Order	Collaborator(s)	Song	Original Artist
19.1	Celia Babini, Shawn Sounds and John Legend	"I Say a Little Prayer"	Dionne Warwick
23.8	Sarah McLachlan	"Angel (Sarah McLachlan song)"	Sarah McLachlan

== Discography ==
=== Extended plays ===
Title	Details	Peak chart positions
Title	Details	US
The Voice: The Complete Season 16 Collection	Released: May 31, 2019; Label: Republic; Formats: Digital download, streaming	173

=== Singles ===
Title	Year	Peak chart positions	
Title	Year	US Adult Pop	US Digital
"Fallingwater"	2019	—	—
"The Scientist"	2019	—	42
"Stay"	2019	—	15
"Hallelujah"	2019	—	6
"Unforgettable (with John Legend)"	2019	—	33
"Wait for You"	2019	—	24
"—" denotes releases that did not chart

Awards and achievements
Preceded by Chevel Shepherd	The Voice (American); Winner; 2019 (Spring)	Succeeded by Jake Hoot
Preceded by "Broken Hearts"	The Voice (American); Winner's song "Wait for You"; 2019 (Spring)	Succeeded by "Better Off Without You"
