= Ricky Duran =

American singer

- Born: August 31, 1989 (age 36); Worcester, Massachusetts United States
- Genres: Rock; pop
- Occupation: Singer
- Years active: 2014–present

Ricky Duran (born August 31, 1989) is an American rock singer. He is the runner-up on season 17 of the American talent competition The Voice at the age of 30.

== Early life ==
Ricky Duran was born on August 31, 1989, in Worcester, Massachusetts and grew up in Grafton, MA. His parents, Ricardo and Odette Duran, immigrated to Massachusetts from Guatemala. He was awarded a scholarship to Berklee School of Music, and graduated in 2011.

He is the youngest of four children. Both of his parents died when he was in his 20s. His father died by suicide and his mother died of breast cancer.

== Career ==
In 2019, Duran entered the 17th season of The Voice after an unsuccessful attempt in the 6th season. In his blind audition, He sang "River" by Leon Bridges. all four coaches turned their chairs and gave a standing ovation. He chose to become a member of Team Blake. He made it to the finale and became the runner-up on December 17, 2019.

In December 2020, he released his first single, "She Closed Her Eyes". His debut album, Space & Time, was released in 2022.

=== The Voice (2019) ===
==== The Voice performances ====
Stage	Song	Original artist	Order	Result
Blind Audition	"River"	Leon Bridges	5.13	All four coaches turned, Joined Team Blake
Battles (Top 48)	"Valerie" (vs. Marina Chello)	Amy Winehouse	9.2	Saved by Coach
Knockouts (Top 32)	"She Talks to Angels" (vs. Joana Martinez)	The Black Crowes	12.3	Saved by Coach
Live Playoffs (Top 20)	"Small Town"	John Cougar Mellencamp	15.1	Saved by Public
Live Top 13	"You Are the Best Thing"	Ray LaMontagne	17.2	Saved by Public
Live Top 11	"Downtown Train"	Tom Waits	19.11	Saved by Public
Live Top 10	"Born Under a Bad Sign"	Albert King	21.9	Saved by Public
Live Semifinals (Top 8)	"Your Love" (duet with Will Breman)	The Outfield	23.	Saved by Public
Live Semifinals (Top 8)	"Let It Be"	The Beatles	23.6	Saved by Public
Live Finale (Final 4)	"Run Rudolph Run" with (Blake Shelton)	Chuck Berry	25.5	Runner-up
Live Finale (Final 4)	"A Woman Like Her" (original song)	Ricky Duran	25.11	Runner-up
Live Finale (Final 4)	"Runnin' Down a Dream"	Tom Petty	25.1	Runner-up

== Discography ==
=== Singles ===
Single	Year	Peak chart positions
Single	Year	US Country
"A Woman Like Her"	2019	
