= Long Way from Home =

Long Way from Home may refer to:

- Long Way from Home (EP), a 1979 EP by Whitesnake
- Long Way from Home (album), a 2017 album by Peter Cincotti
- "Long Way from Home" (song), a 1991 single by Copperhead
- A Long Way from Home (album), a 1969 album by Brownie McGhee and Sonny Terry
- A Long Way from Home (Shameless), an episode of the American television comedy drama Shameless
- "Long Way from Home", a song by Fatboy Slim from Palookaville
- "Long Way from Home", a song by Krokus from Change of Address
- "Long Way from Home", a song by the Lumineers from Cleopatra
- Long Way from Home, a 1975 novel by Michael Morpurgo
