= Jake Hoot =

American country singer

- Born: July 7, 1988 (age 37); Corpus Christi, Texas, U.S.
- Genres: Country
- Occupation: Singer
- Instruments: Vocals; Guitar
- Years active: 2019–present

Jake Hoot (born July 7, 1988) is an American country singer. He is the winner of season 17 of the American talent competition The Voice at the age of 31. He competed on the team coached by Kelly Clarkson, giving her third win as a coach on the show. Hoot was the second one-chair turn from The Voice U.S.'s blind auditions to win his season, after Team Alicia's Chris Blue, the final contestant to audition on season 12, and the first to do so outright (minimum two coaches eligible to turn).

== Early life ==
Jake Hoot was born in Corpus Christi, Texas on July 7, 1988. Jake is the second oldest of nine siblings born to Aaron and Stacey Hoot, both of whom are Christian missionaries. At the age of nine, he and his family relocated to the Dominican Republic where his parents lived and worked as missionaries from 1998 to 2008. He learned the guitar and began singing while in the country, became fluent in Spanish, and played in the Dominican baseball league for a year. Upon returning to the U.S., he was homeschooled; in 2009, he attended Tennessee Tech. He had a back-up role playing football on Tennessee Tech's offensive line for his first year in 2010. He graduated with a degree in interdisciplinary studies in 2013 and found a job at a local media production company. At the same time, he pursued a music career and built his popularity by performing in many local gigs.

== Career ==
=== The Voice (2019) ===
In 2019, Hoot entered the 17th season of The Voice. In his blind audition, he sang "When It Rains It Pours" by Luke Combs. Only Kelly Clarkson turned her chair; thus, he was on Team Kelly by default. He advanced to the finale, and won the season on December 17, 2019.

– Studio version of performance was the most streamed song on Apple Music

Stage	Song	Original artist	Order	Result
Blind Auditions	"When It Rains It Pours"	Luke Combs	3.2	Only Kelly Clarkson turned, Joined Team Kelly by default
Battles (Top 48)	"Always on My Mind" (vs. Steve Knill)	Brenda Lee	9.3	Saved by Kelly
Knockouts (Top 32)	"Cover Me Up" (vs. Melinda Rodriguez)	Jason Isbell	11.2	Saved by Kelly
Live Playoffs (Top 20)	"You Lie"	Reba McEntire	15.15	Saved by Public
Live Top 13	"Danny's Song"	Loggins and Messina	17.12	Saved by Public
Live Top 11	"Every Light in the House"	Trace Adkins	19.10	Saved by Public
Live Top 10	"That Ain't My Truck"	Rhett Akins	21.5	Saved by Public
Live Semi-finals (Top 8)	"Up Where We Belong" (duet with Marybeth Byrd)	Joe Cocker and Jennifer Warnes	23.	Saved by Public
Live Semi-finals (Top 8)	"Desperado"	Eagles	23.8	Saved by Public
Live Finale (Final 4)	"Wintersong" with (Kelly Clarkson)	Sarah McLachlan	25.7	Winner
Live Finale (Final 4)	"Better Off Without You" (original song)	Jake Hoot	25.2	Winner
Live Finale (Final 4)	"Amazed"	Lonestar	25.9	Winner

== After The Voice ==
"Better Off Without You", his coronation-winning song written by Hoot himself, became his first single. Hoot made his Grand Ole Opry debut on February 4, 2020.

== Personal life ==
Hoot married Jessica Lynn Steele, an emergency room nurse, in 2013. The couple had a daughter, Macy, born in 2015. Hoot released some songs on YouTube singing to his daughter. The couple divorced in 2017.

On March 7, 2021, he married Brittney Hoyt. They have one daughter, born July 24, 2022. In January 2024, they announced they were expecting their second child together.

== Discography ==
=== Singles ===
Year	Single	Peak chart positions	
Year	Single	US Country	US Country Digital
2019	"Better Off Without You"	36	—
2021	"I Would've Loved You" (feat. Kelly Clarkson)	–	5

=== Other charted songs ===
Year	Songs	Peak chart positions
Year	Songs	US Country
2019	"Desperado"	38
2019	"Wintersong"	30
2019	"Amazed"	50

Awards and achievements
Preceded by Maelyn Jarmon	The Voice (American); Winner; 2019 (Fall)	Succeeded by Todd Tilghman
Preceded by "Wait for You"	The Voice (American); Winner's song "Better Off Without You"; 2019 (Fall)	Succeeded by "Long Way Home"
