= Long Ride Home =

1988 book by W. Michael Gear

- Author: W. Michael Gear
- Language: English
- Genre: Historical fiction; Western fiction
- Set in: 1874
- Publisher: Tom Doherty Associates
- Publication date: November 1988
- Publication place: United States
- Media type: Print
- Pages: 404
- ISBN: 0-7653-2256-0

Long Ride Home (1988) is a novel by W. Michael Gear.
