= Better Off Without You (Jake Hoot song) =

Single by Jake Hoot
- Released: December 16, 2019
- Recorded: 2019
- Genre: Country
- Length: 3:17
- Label: Republic
- Songwriter(s): Jake Hoot

"Better Off Without You" is a song by American country singer Jake Hoot. It is Hoot's coronation song following his victory on the 17th season of The Voice. It was written by himself.

== Background ==
The song is co-written by Jake Hoot and Dave Pahanish, who also initially produced the song. According to Hoot, he wrote the song in a dark period while going through a divorce from his wife. He said: "That was my lowest point. I was sitting there one night. I thought of the lyric, 'I can see the thunder and hear the dark.'" However, he said that the song is not a slight on his ex-wife, as his co-write Pahanish came up with the title of the song and he used the line for the song.

The song was first released as a single in May 2019 before he appeared on The Voice. Hoot performed the song in the finale of The Voice, and his performance was well-received by the coaches on the show. It was re-released after he performed the song.

== Charts ==
Chart (2019)	Peak position
US Hot Country Songs (Billboard)	36
