= Preach (John Legend song) =

Single by John Legend
- Released: February 15, 2019
- Length: 3:57
- Label: Sony Music; John Legend Music; Columbia
- Songwriter(s): Greg Kurstin; Sarah Aarons; John Stephens
- Producer(s): Greg Kurstin

John Legend singles chronology
"A Good Night" (2018)	"Preach" (2019)	"Higher" (2019)

Music video
- "Preach" on YouTube

"Preach" is a song by American singer-songwriter John Legend. It was written by Greg Kurstin and Sarah Aarons and produced by Greg Kurstin. Released as a single by John Legend Music and Sony Music Entertainment on February 15, 2019, it reached number twelve on the US Billboard Adult R&B Songs chart.

== Track listing ==
Digital download
No.	Title	Length
1.	"Preach"	3:57

== Personnel ==
Credits adapted from the liner notes of "Preach".

- Backing vocals – Sarah Aarons
- Engineering – Alex Pasco, Julian Burg and Greg Kurstin
- Guitar – Greg Kurstin
- Keyboards, bass guitar – Greg Kurstin
- Mastering – Randy Merrill
- Mixing – John Hanes and Serban Ghenea
- Production, drums – Greg Kurstin
- Writing – Greg Kurstin, Sarah Aarons and John Legend

== Charts ==
Chart (2019)	Peak position
Belgium (Ultratip Bubbling Under Wallonia)	16
Belgium Urban (Ultratop Wallonia)	26
Canada AC (Billboard)	22
China Airplay/FL (Billboard)	41
Croatia Airplay (HRT)	41
Hungary (Rádiós Top 40)	36
Netherlands (Tipparade)	1
New Zealand Hot Singles (RMNZ)	27
Poland (Polish Airplay Top 100)	30
US Adult R&B Songs (Billboard)	12
