= Adam David =

American singer-songwriter

- Born: January 20, 1990 (age 36)
- Origin: Fort Lauderdale, Florida, U.S.
- Genres: Blues rock; soul
- Occupation: Singer
- Instrument: Vocals
- Years active: 2014–present
- Label: Republic
- Website: adamdavidofficial.com

Adam David (born January 20, 1990) is an American blues soul singer-songwriter. He is the winner of season 27 of the American talent competition The Voice. He competed on the team coached by Michael Bublé, giving Bublé his second consecutive win as a coach on the show. David also has the distinctions of being the third one-chair turn winner, the second one-chair turn winner outright (where at least two coaches could turn), the second "Instant Save" winner, and the first to do so with a male coach in the history of the show.

== Career ==
=== 2014: EP, Vol. One ===
In 2014, David independently released his debut EP, EP, Vol. One, which features four singles.

=== 2025–present: The Voice and "Savior" ===
Performances on The Voice season 27
Round	Theme	Song	Original artist	Order	Original air date	Result
Blind Auditions	—N/a	"Baby, I Love Your Way"	Peter Frampton	5.3	March 3, 2025	Michael Bublé turned; defaulted to Team Bublé.
Battles (Top 48)	—N/a	"Home" (vs. Ricardo Moreno)	Michael Bublé	8.5	March 24, 2025	Saved by Michael Bublé
Knockouts (Top 32)	—N/a	"Unaware" (vs. Carlos Santiago)	Allen Stone	11.2	April 14, 2025	Saved by Michael Bublé
Playoffs (Top 20)	—N/a	"I Shall Be Released"	The Band	14.9	May 5, 2025	Saved by Michael Bublé
Live Semi-finals (Top 12)	—N/a	"Bring It On Home to Me"	Sam Cooke	15.9	May 12, 2025	Middle four
Wild Card Instant Save	—N/a	"Lose Control"	Teddy Swims	16.2	May 13, 2025	Instantly Saved
Live Finale (Final 5)	"Ballad"	"You Are So Beautiful"	Joe Cocker	17.5	May 19, 2025	Winner
Live Finale (Final 5)	"Uptempo Song"	"Hard Fought Hallelujah"	Brandon Lake	17.7	May 19, 2025	Winner
Live Finale (Final 5)	"Duet with coach"	"The Weight" (Duet with Michael Bublé)	The Band	19.11	May 20, 2025	Winner

In 2025, David competed in the 27th season of The Voice. In the blind auditions, he sang "Baby, I Love Your Way" by Peter Frampton. Of the season's four coaches, only Michael Bublé turned his chair for David with no other coaches doing so. Bublé selected David to advance through the battle, knockout, and playoff rounds of the show. In the first live round, the semi-final, David finished in the middle four group of the twelve semi-final artists. Thus, he performed an "Instant Save" performance, allowing him to potentially take the last spot in the finale. He won the "Instant Save" round and became the fifth artist in the finale of the show.

David was named the winner of the season on May 20, 2025, meaning Bublé had his second consecutive win in just his second season, after his contestant in season 26, Sofronio Vasquez, won that season in December 2024. David won $100,000 and a record deal with Republic Records, a label owned by Universal Music Group. David is the second artist in the history of the show, after Bryce Leatherwood in season 22, to win the show after previously being in the "Instant Save" in the live shows. While competing on The Voice, David released "Savior", his first single in eleven years. He described the single as reflecting "the night [he] began the process of treatment" towards sobriety.

== Artistry ==
David has been described as a blues musician with elements of soul. On his website, he lists Ray Charles, Jimi Hendrix, James Brown, and Stevie Wonder as influences.

== Personal life ==
David lives in Fort Lauderdale, Florida. He has been sober since 2019 and mentions that he turned to drugs after disappointments he experienced with the music industry as a young adult.

== Discography ==
=== EPs ===
List of extended plays, with selected details
Title	Details
EP, Vol. 1	Released: March 21, 2014 (US)

=== Singles ===
List of singles, showing year released, and the name of the album
Title	Year	EP
"Tennessee Honey"	2014	EP, Vol. 1
"Happiness"	2014	EP, Vol. 1
"Furnace of Love"	2014	EP, Vol. 1
"Too Long"	2014	EP, Vol. 1
"Savior"	2025	—N/a

Awards and achievements
Preceded by Sofronio Vasquez	The Voice (American); Winner; 2025 (Spring)	Succeeded by Aiden Ross
Preceded by "Unstoppable"	The Voice (American); Winner's song "Hard Fought Hallelujah"; 2025 (Spring)	Succeeded by "The Winner Takes It All"
