= The Voice (American TV series) season 27 =

The Voice
- Season 27
- Promotional poster featuring coaches Legend, Ballerini, Levine, and Bublé
- Hosted by: Carson Daly
- Coaches: John Legend; Michael Bublé; Kelsea Ballerini; Adam Levine
- No. of contestants: 48 artists
- Winner: Adam David
- Winning coach: Michael Bublé
- Runner-up: Jaelen Johnston
- No. of episodes: 19

Release
- Original network: NBC
- Original release: February 3 – May 20, 2025

Season chronology
- ← Previous; Season 26 Next → Season 28

The twenty-seventh season of the American reality television series The Voice premiered on February 3, 2025, on NBC. The season is hosted by Carson Daly who has hosted every season of the show. The coaching panel consists of Michael Bublé, who returns for his second consecutive season; John Legend, who returns for his tenth season after a one-season hiatus; Adam Levine, who returns for his seventeenth season after last coaching during the sixteenth season; and Kelsea Ballerini, who joins the panel as a new coach.

Adam David was named the winner of the season, marking Michael Bublé's second and final consecutive win as a coach. Bublé became the fourth coach to win multiple consecutive seasons, following Blake Shelton's consecutive wins from seasons 2 to 4, Kelly Clarkson's consecutive wins in seasons 14 and 15, and Niall Horan's consecutive wins in seasons 23 and 24. With David's win, Bublé became the third coach (after Clarkson and Horan) to win their first two seasons. David is also the second winning artist to be saved by the Instant Save, following Bryce Leatherwood in season 22. Additionally, David became the third winner in the history of the show to have been a one-chair turn in blind auditions, following Chris Blue and Jake Hoot in seasons 12 and 17, respectively and the second outright where every coach could turn after Hoot in season 17. He also became the first one-chair turn winner to do so with a male coach, that of Bublé.

== Overview ==
=== Development ===
On June 4, 2024, NBC announced that The Voice was renewed for a twenty-seventh season to air in the spring of 2025. On June 5, the lineup of coaches was revealed on the show's website.

=== Coaches and host ===
Coaches and Host of The Voice Season 27

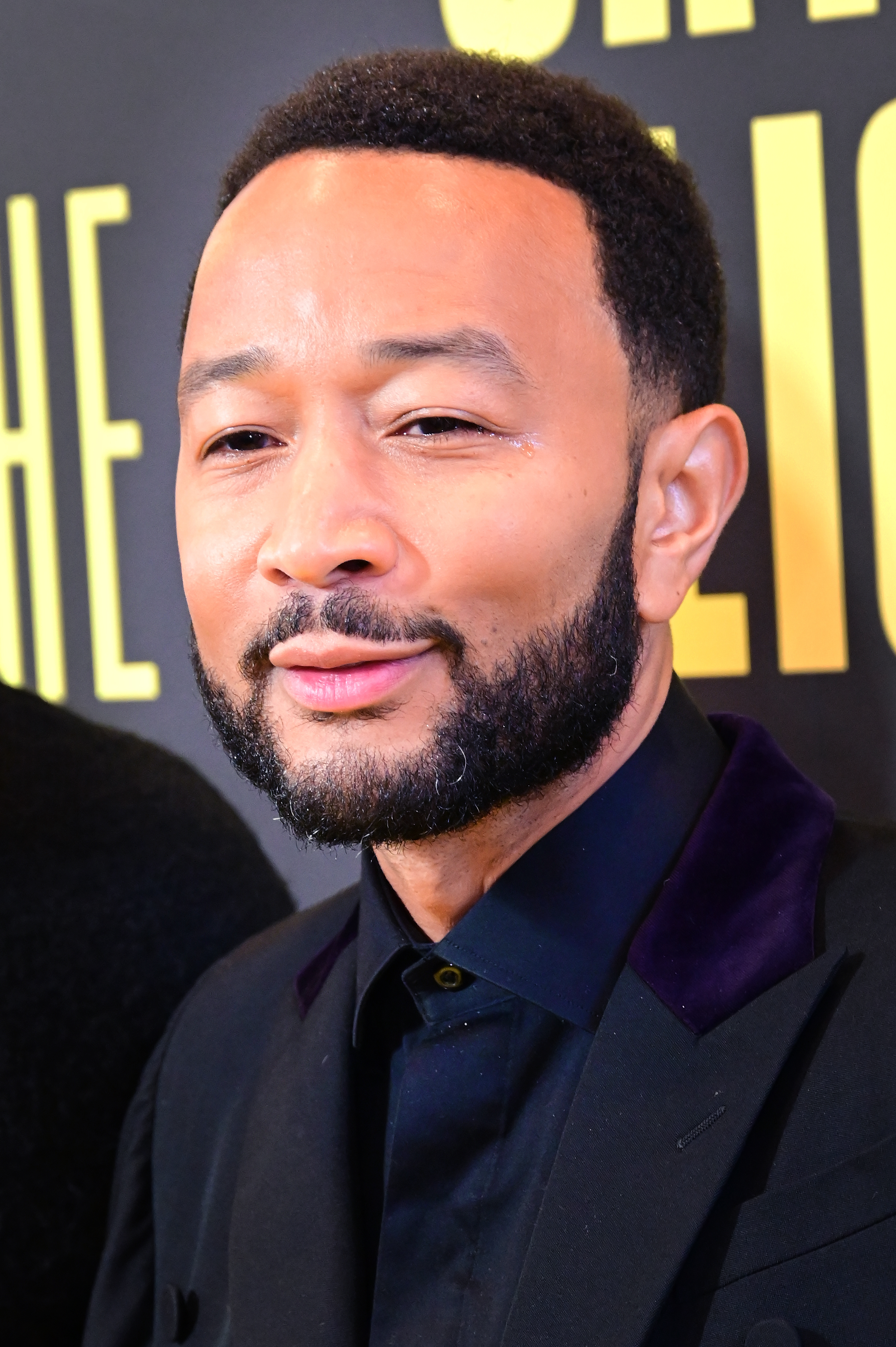
John Legend

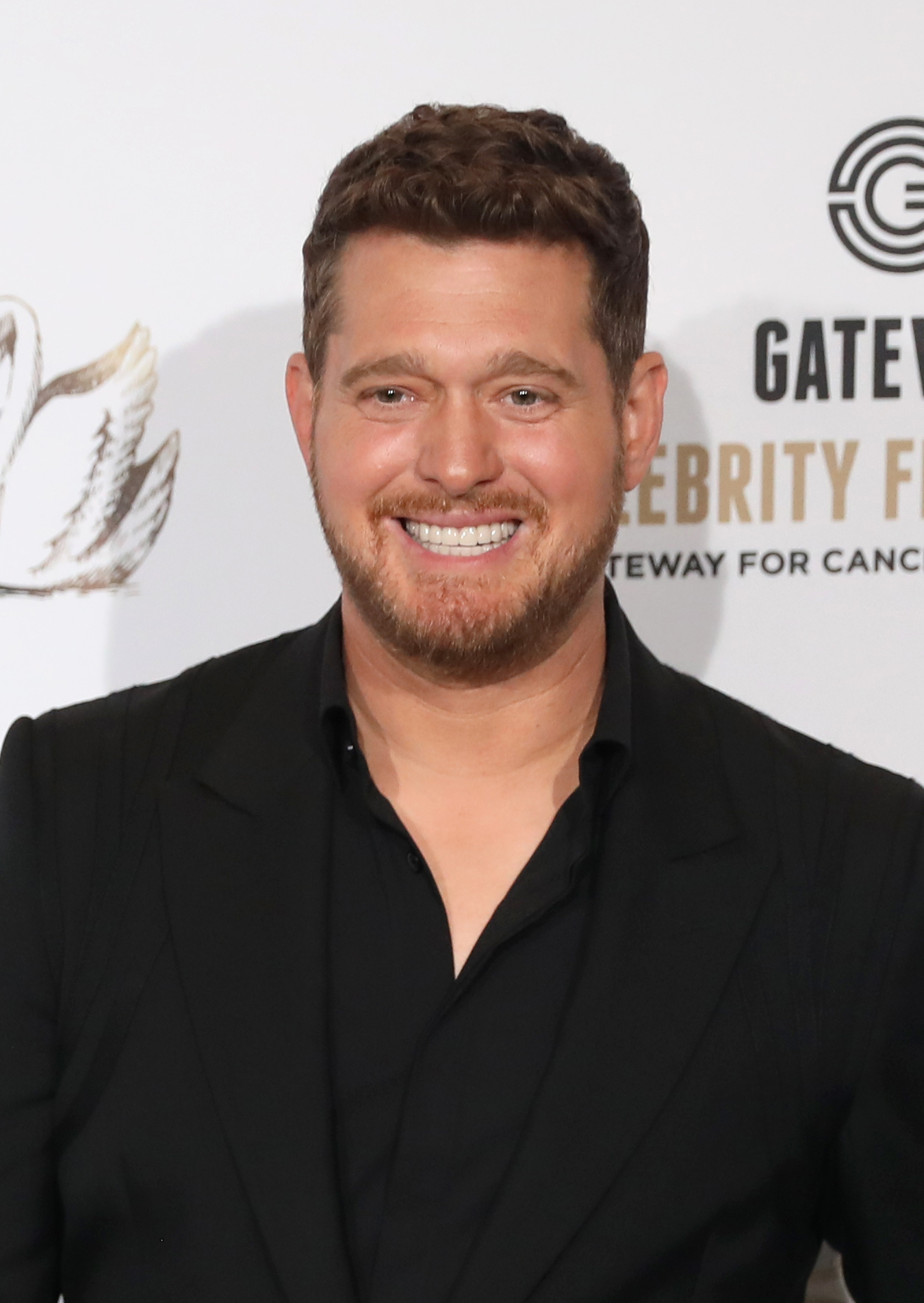
Michael Bublé

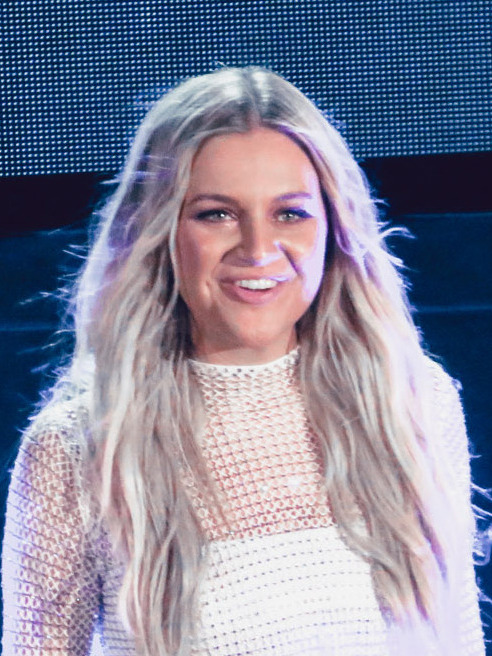
Kelsea Ballerini

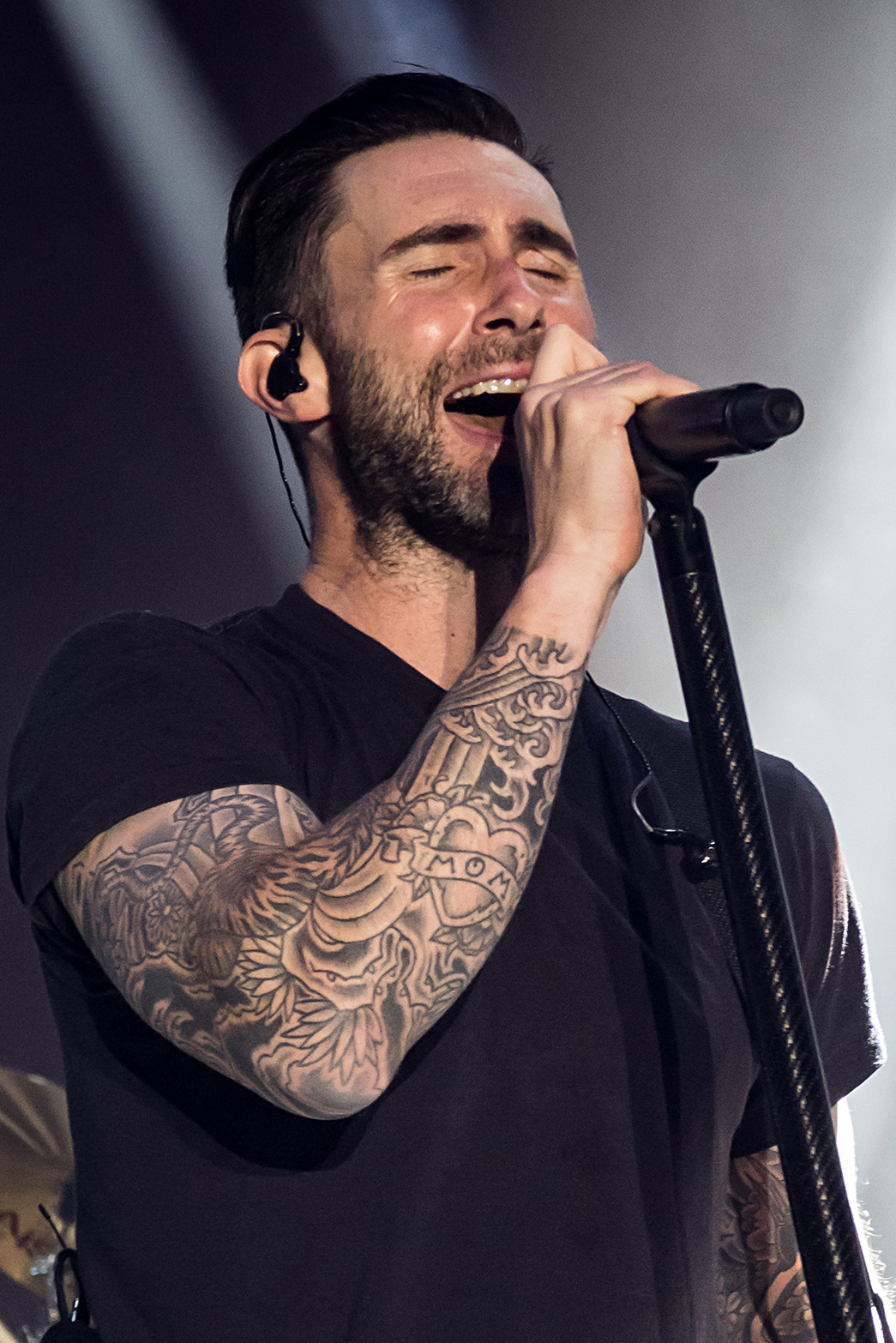
Adam Levine

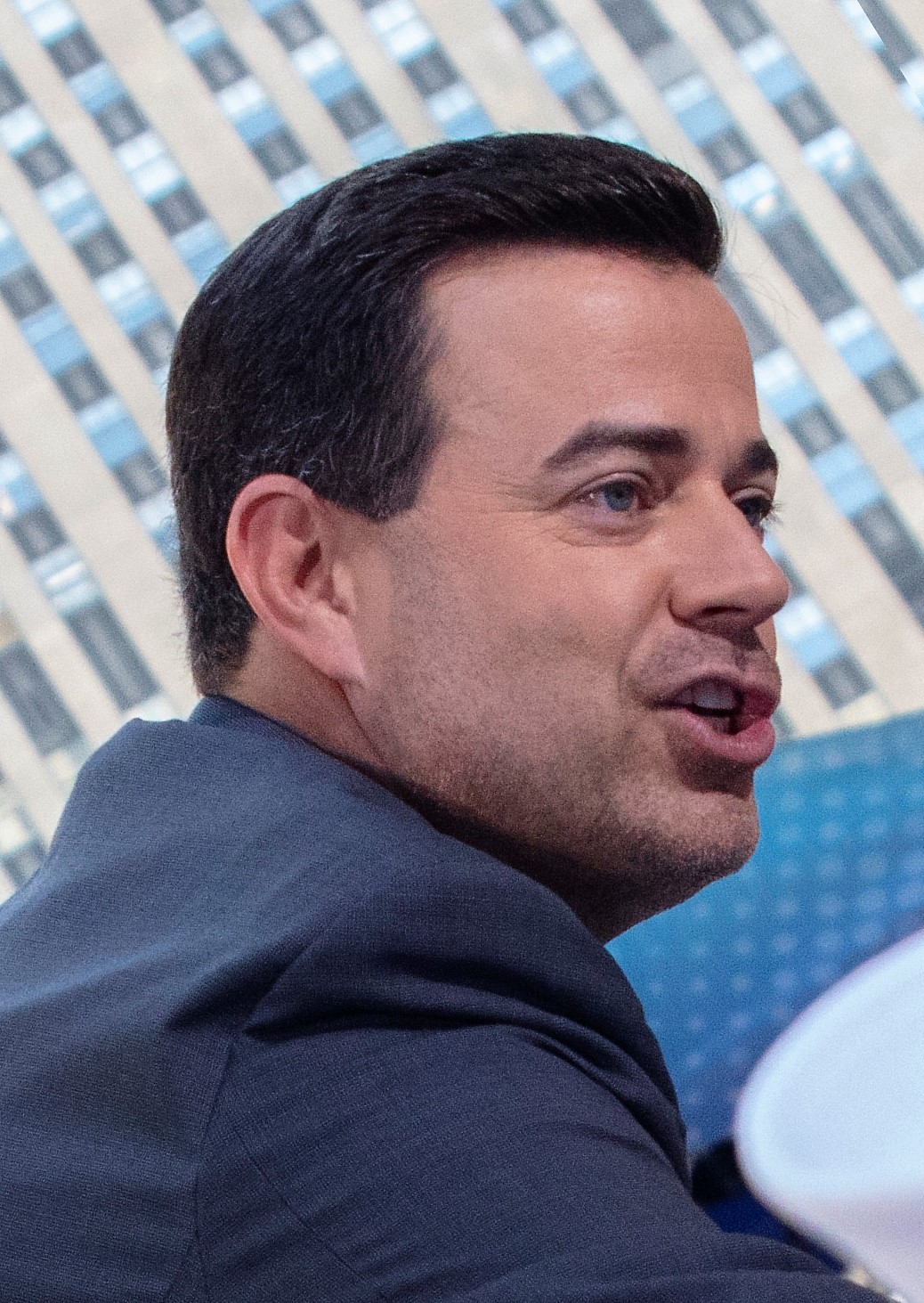
Carson Daly

Of the four coaches from the previous season, only Michael Bublé returned, marking his second consecutive season as a coach. Coaches Reba McEntire, Gwen Stefani, and Snoop Dogg all left the panel. Former coach John Legend returns to the show following his absence in the previous season, marking his tenth season as a coach. Former coach Adam Levine also returns to the show after a ten-season hiatus, marking his seventeenth season on the show as a coach. With Levine's return, this is the first time since season 23 in which at least one coach from the inaugural season is featured. Additionally Kelsea Ballerini joins the panel for her first season as a coach. She has made multiple appearances on the show: she was featured as the "Comeback Stage" coach during the fifteenth season, served as a battle advisor for Kelly Clarkson's team during the sixteenth season, and filled in as a guest coach for Clarkson during the battle rounds in the twentieth season.

Carson Daly returns for his twenty-seventh consecutive season as host.

=== Battle and playoff advisors ===
The teams' battle advisors were revealed on March 3, 2025. The battle advisors for this season are Coco Jones for Team Legend, Cynthia Erivo for Team Bublé, Little Big Town for Team Kelsea, and Kate Hudson for Team Adam. The playoff advisors were revealed on April 14, 2025. LeAnn Rimes served as an advisor for Teams Adam and Legend and Sheryl Crow served as an advisor for Teams Bublé and Kelsea.

=== Marketing and promotion ===
Ahead of the season's premiere, on January 31, the show, via its online media platforms, released a cover of the 1972 Elton John single "Tiny Dancer" performed by the coaches.

Shortly prior to the season premiere, the blind audition of Ethan Eckenroad, performing Noah Kahan's "Northern Attitude", was released online. Additionally, Angie Rey's post-blind audition was featured on the Today show on January 27th during Kelsea Ballerini's interview. Later episodes saw the auditions of Tatum Scott, Jessica Manalo, Lucia Flores-Wiseman, and Alanna Lynise released online as a sneak peek for their respective episodes.

== Teams ==
Teams color key
| Winner | Eliminated in the Playoffs |
| Runner-up | Stolen in the Knockouts |
| Third place | Eliminated in the Knockouts |
| Fourth place | Stolen in the Battles |
| Fifth place | Eliminated in the Battles |
| Eliminated in the Live Semifinals |

Coaches' teams
| Coach | Top 48 Artists | | | |
|---|---|---|---|---|
| John Legend | | | | |
| John Legend | Renzo | Bryson Battle | Olivia Kuper Harris | BD.ii |
| John Legend | Ari Camille | ~~Kolby Cordell~~ | Jacquelyn George | Tatum Scott |
| John Legend | Nell Simmons | ~~Ari Camille~~ | Jordan Allen | Jay Ammo |
| John Legend | Pablo Herrera | Antonio Ramsey | | |
| Michael Bublé | | | | |
| Michael Bublé | Adam David | Jadyn Cree | Kaiya Hamilton | Barry Jean Fontenot |
| Michael Bublé | Angie Rey | Divighn | Kameron Jaso | Simone Marijic |
| Michael Bublé | Carlos Santiago | Braxton Garza | Dimitrius Graham | Ricardo Moreno |
| Michael Bublé | Aaron Rizzo | Naomi Soleil | | |
| Kelsea Ballerini | | | | |
| Kelsea Ballerini | Jaelen Johnston | Iris Herrera | Alanna Lynise | Darius J. |
| Kelsea Ballerini | Tinika Wyatt | ~~Angie Rey~~ | Dan Kiernan | Page Mackenzie |
| Kelsea Ballerini | Hailey Wright | ~~Simone Marijic~~ | ~~Tatum Scott~~ | Robert Hunter |
| Kelsea Ballerini | Jessica Manalo | Brook Wood | | |
| Adam Levine | | | | |
| Adam Levine | Lucia Flores-Wiseman | Kolby Cordell | Conor James | Ethan Eckenroad |
| Adam Levine | Britton Moore | ~~Ari Camille~~ | ~~Darius J.~~ | Trevon Dawson |
| Adam Levine | Grace-Miller Moody | ~~Tinika Wyatt~~ | Hayden Grove | Tyler Kae |
| Adam Levine | Fran Posla | Tori Templet | | |
Note: Italicized names are artists stolen from another team during the battles or the knockouts (names struck through within former teams). Underlined names are artists who were saved by their coach in the battles. Bold names are recipients of the "Coach Replay" button. Double Underlined names are recipients of the 'super save'.

== Blind auditions ==
The show began with the Blind Auditions on February 3, 2025. In each audition, an artist sings their piece in front of the coaches, whose chairs face the audience. If a coach is interested in working with the artist, they may press their button to face the artist. If only one coach presses the button, the artist automatically becomes part of their team. If multiple coaches turn, they will compete for the artist, who will decide which team they will join. Each coach has one "block" to prevent another coach from getting an artist. This season, each coach ends up with 12 artists by the end of the blind auditions, creating a total of 48 artists advancing to the battles.

The "Coach Replay" button, introduced in the previous season, returned this season.

Once again, each coach is allowed to press their button one time in the span of the blind auditions for an artist that was originally eliminated with no coaches turning. The artist is subsequently defaulted to that team if only one coach use or gets to pick if multiple do so. However, the winning coach loses their "Coach Replay" opportunity if a singer joins that team. (Note: If a coach uses Coach Replay with multiple chairs turned, it is a “steal.")

The recipients of this feature for each team were Dan Kiernan for Team Kelsea, Ricardo Moreno for Team Bublé, Tinika Wyatt for Team Adam, and Antonio Ramsey for Team Legend, respectively. Three of the four did not have any chair turns, while Dan Kiernan had two (Legend and Buble, before Ballerini 'stole' Kiernan).

This is the second instance since season 21's Ariana Grande that a debuting coach (Kelsea Ballerini) does not have any four-chair turns on their team, as Shakira, Usher, Gwen Stefani, Pharrell Williams, Miley Cyrus, Alicia Keys, Jennifer Hudson, Kelly Clarkson, John Legend, Nick Jonas, Camila Cabello, Chance the Rapper, Niall Horan, Reba McEntire, Dan + Shay, Michael Bublé, and Snoop Dogg have at least one four-chair turner on their teams on their respective debut seasons.

Blind auditions color key
| ✔ | Coach hit his/her "I WANT YOU" button |
| | Artist defaulted to this coach's team |
| | Artist selected to join this coach's team |
| | Artist was recipient of "Coach Replay" button |
| | Artist was eliminated with no coach pressing their button |
| ✘ | Coach pressed "I WANT YOU" button, but was blocked by another coach from getting the artist |
| | Blocked by John; Blocked by Michael; Blocked by Kelsea; Blocked by Adam |

=== Episode 1 (Feb. 3) ===
Among this episode's auditionees was Renzo, who previously competed under his real name, Dennis Lorenzo, on the sixteenth season of American Idol; Iris Herrera, who previously auditioned unsuccessfully in season 26; Jadyn Cree Olesen, the daughter of season 25's third-place finalist, Bryan Olesen; and Angie Rey, who previously competed under her real name, Ángela Rodriguez, on the first season of La Voz Kids.

First blind auditions results
| Order | Artist | Age | Hometown | Song | Coach's and artist's choices | | | |
| Order | Artist | Age | Hometown | Song | John | Michael | Kelsea | Adam |
|---|---|---|---|---|---|---|---|---|
| 1 | Grace-Miller Moody | 20 | Florence, South Carolina | "Sunday Morning" | ✔ | ✔ | ✔ | ✔ |
| 2 | Renzo (Dennis Lorenzo Parker) (Note: Presented onscreen in all caps) | 33 | Philadelphia, Pennsylvania | "Simple Man" | ✔ | ✔ | – | ✘ |
| 3 | Iris Herrera | 19 | Newaygo, Michigan | "You Are My Sunshine" | ✔ | ✔ | ✔ | – |
| 4 | Jadyn Cree | 23 | Lincoln, Nebraska | "Still Into You" | – | ✔ | ✔ | – |
| 5 | Zack Zaro | 28 | Lynbrook, New York | "…Baby One More Time" | – | – | – | – |
| 6 | Darius J. | 35 | Pahokee, Florida | "Caught Up" | – | ✔ | ✔ | ✔ |
| 7 | Angie Rey (Angela Rodriguez) | 25 | Seminole, Florida | "Penthouse" (Note: A. Rey and Ballerini later performed a snippet of the same song after Rey's audition.) | – | – | ✔ | – |
| 8 | Carlos Santiago | 35 | Nashville, Tennessee / Caguas, Puerto Rico | "Right Here Waiting" | – | ✔ | – | ✔ |
| 9 | Dan Kiernan | 33 | Amityville, New York | "High Hopes" | ✔ | ✔ | ✔ (Note: Although the coach replay is used to rescue artists with no chair turns, Ballerini used it to steal Kiernan with two chairs turned.) | – |
| 10 | Lilli Doll | 20 | Irwin, Ohio | "Heart of Glass" | – | – | – | – |
| 11 | Ethan Eckenroad | 27 | Roaring Spring, Pennsylvania | "Northern Attitude" | ✔ | ✔ | ✔ | ✔ |

=== Episode 2 (Feb. 10) ===
Second blind auditions results
| Order | Artist | Age | Hometown | Song | Coach's and artist's choices | | | |
| Order | Artist | Age | Hometown | Song | John | Michael | Kelsea | Adam |
|---|---|---|---|---|---|---|---|---|
| 1 | Tatum Scott | 22 | High Point, North Carolina | "Vampire" | ✔ | – | ✔ | – |
| 2 | Bryson Battle | 21 | Harrisburg, North Carolina | "A Song for You" | ✔ | ✔ | ✔ | ✔ |
| 3 | Jordan Allen | 30 | London, Kentucky | "Old Time Rock and Roll" | ✔ | ✔ | – | – |
| 4 | Hayden Grove | 31 | Cleveland, Ohio | "Mack the Knife" | – | – | – | ✔ |
| 5 | Susan Hickman | 39 | Dickinson, Texas | "It Must Have Been Love" | – | – | – | – |
| 6 | Jaelen Johnston | 21 | Derby, Kansas | "Where the Wild Things Are" | – | ✔ | ✔ | ✔ |
| 7 | Ricardo Moreno | 25 | Tracy, California | "Put Your Head on My Shoulder" | – | ✔ | – | – |
| 8 | Ari Camille | 21 | Chicago, Illinois | "I Wanna Be Down" | ✔ | ✔ | – | – |
| 9 | Braxton Garza | 28 | Adrian, Michigan | "Pretty Little Poison" | – | ✔ | ✘ | – |
| 10 | Carmela | 29 | Los Angeles, California | "Like a Stone" | – | – | – | – |
| 11 | Britton Moore | 21 | San Antonio, Texas | "Yellow" | ✔ | ✔ | ✔ | ✔ |

=== Episode 3 (Feb. 17) ===
Third blind auditions results
| Order | Artist | Age | Hometown | Song | Coach's and artist's choices | | | |
| Order | Artist | Age | Hometown | Song | John | Michael | Kelsea | Adam |
|---|---|---|---|---|---|---|---|---|
| 1 | Divighn (Devaughn Roseman) | 33 | Gardena, California | "I Got You (I Feel Good)" | – | ✔ | ✔ | – |
| 2 | Jacquelyn George | 27 | Franklin, Tennessee | "I Have Nothing" (Note: J. George and J. Legend later performed a snippet of the song "Ordinary People" after George's audition.) | ✔ | – | – | ✔ |
| 3 | Tinika Wyatt | 50 | San Diego, California | "Sorry Not Sorry" | – | – | – | ✔ |
| 4 | Page Mackenzie | 32 | Charleston, South Carolina | "Hell on Heels" | – | ✔ | ✔ | – |
| 5 | Jonny Rey | 27 | Hammonton, New Jersey | "She Will Be Loved" | – | – | – | – |
| 6 | Conor James | 28 | Bridgewater, Massachusetts | "I Say a Little Prayer" | ✔ | ✔ | ✔ | ✔ |
| 7 | Jessica Manalo | 31 | Las Vegas, Nevada | "Unholy" | – | ✔ | ✔ | – |
| 8 | Barry Jean Fontenot | 31 | Bentonville, Arkansas | "I Wish It Would Rain" | – | ✔ | – | – |
| 9 | Tyler Kae | 22 | Olympia, Washington | "Girls Just Want to Have Fun" | – | – | ✘ | ✔ |
| 10 | Afina Madoian | 27 | Los Angeles, California / Chișinău, Moldova | "Saving All My Love for You" | – | – | – | – |
| 11 | BD.ii (Brian Darden II) | 31 | Hampton, Virginia | "Adorn" | ✔ | ✔ | ✔ | ✘ |

=== Episode 4 (Feb. 24) ===
Among this episode's auditionees was Dimitrius Graham, who previously competed on the seventeenth season of American Idol; and Olivia Kuper Harris, who previously competed on an episode of I Can See Your Voice.

Fourth blind auditions results
| Order | Artist | Age | Hometown | Song | Coach's and artist's choices | | | |
| Order | Artist | Age | Hometown | Song | John | Michael | Kelsea | Adam |
|---|---|---|---|---|---|---|---|---|
| 1 | Kolby Cordell | 32 | Ontario, California | "Never Too Much" | ✔ | ✔ | – | – |
| 2 | Hailey Wright | 19 | Redwater, Texas | "Before the Next Teardrop Falls" | – | ✔ | ✔ | – |
| 3 | Fran Posla | 25 | New York City, New York / Heredia, Costa Rica | "What the World Needs Now Is Love" | ✔ | – | – | ✔ |
| 4 | Dimitrius Graham | 33 | Baltimore, Maryland | "Get You" | – | ✔ | ✔ | – |
| 5 | Emily McGill | 26 | Nashville, Tennessee | "Gold Dust Woman" | – | – | – | – |
| 6 | Olivia Kuper Harris | 34 | Dallas, Texas | "Dream a Little Dream of Me" | ✔ | – | ✔ | ✔ |
| 7 | Kaiya Hamilton | 26 | Greenville, North Carolina | "ICU" | – | ✔ | ✔ | – |
| 8 | Aaron Rizzo | 27 | Rochester, New York | "Drops of Jupiter" | – | ✔ | – | – |
| 9 | Kameron Jaso | 18 | Wichita, Kansas | "This Town" | – | ✔ | – | – |
| 10 | Nell Simmons | 40 | New Orleans, Louisiana | "Love Hangover" | ✔ | – | – | – |
| 11 | Antonio Ramsey | 35 | West Palm Beach, Florida | "Every Little Step" | ✔ | – | – | – |
| 12 | Robert Hunter | 33 | Garner, North Carolina | "Til You Can't" | – | ✔ | ✔ | – |
| 13 | Elliott Fleetwood | 25 | Niagara Falls, New York | "Cough Syrup" | – | – | – | – |
| 14 | Lucia Flores-Wiseman | 22 | Maple Valley, Washington | "La Llorona" | ✔ | ✔ | ✔ | ✔ |

=== Episode 5 (March 3) ===
Among this episode's auditionees was William Casanova, who previously competed on the sixteenth season of American Idol.

Fifth blind auditions results
| Order | Artist | Age | Hometown | Song | Coach's and artist's choices | | | |
| Order | Artist | Age | Hometown | Song | John | Michael | Kelsea | Adam |
|---|---|---|---|---|---|---|---|---|
| 1 | Jay Ammo | 29 | Clarksville, Tennessee / Georgetown, Guyana | "The A Team" | ✔ | ✔ | ✔ | ✔ |
| 2 | Brook Wood | 33 | Indianapolis, Indiana | "Save Me" | ✔ | – | ✔ | – |
| 3 | Adam David | 34 | Fort Lauderdale, Florida | "Baby, I Love Your Way" | – | ✔ | – | – |
| 4 | William Casanova | 32 | Washington, D.C. | "What You Won't Do for Love" | – | – | – | – |
| 5 | Simone Marijic | 20 | Los Angeles, California | "Favorite Crime" | – | ✔ | ✔ | – |
| 6 | Pablo Herrera | 31 | San Diego, California | "Jealous" | ✔ | ✔ | ✔ | – |
| 7 | Tori Templet | 24 | Atlanta, Georgia | "Lover" | Team full | ✔ | – | ✔ |
| 8 | Alanna Lynise | 21 | Toledo, Ohio | "Issues" | Team full | ✔ | ✔ | ✔ |
| 9 | Naomi Soleil | 18 | Maplewood, New Jersey | "Stars" | Team full | ✔ | Team full | ✔ |
| 10 | Cornelius Versa | 35 | Detroit, Michigan | "Burning Love" | Team full | Team full | Team full | – |
| 11 | Trevon Dawson | 17 | Cole Camp, Missouri | "Religiously" | Team full | Team full | Team full | ✔ |

== Battles ==
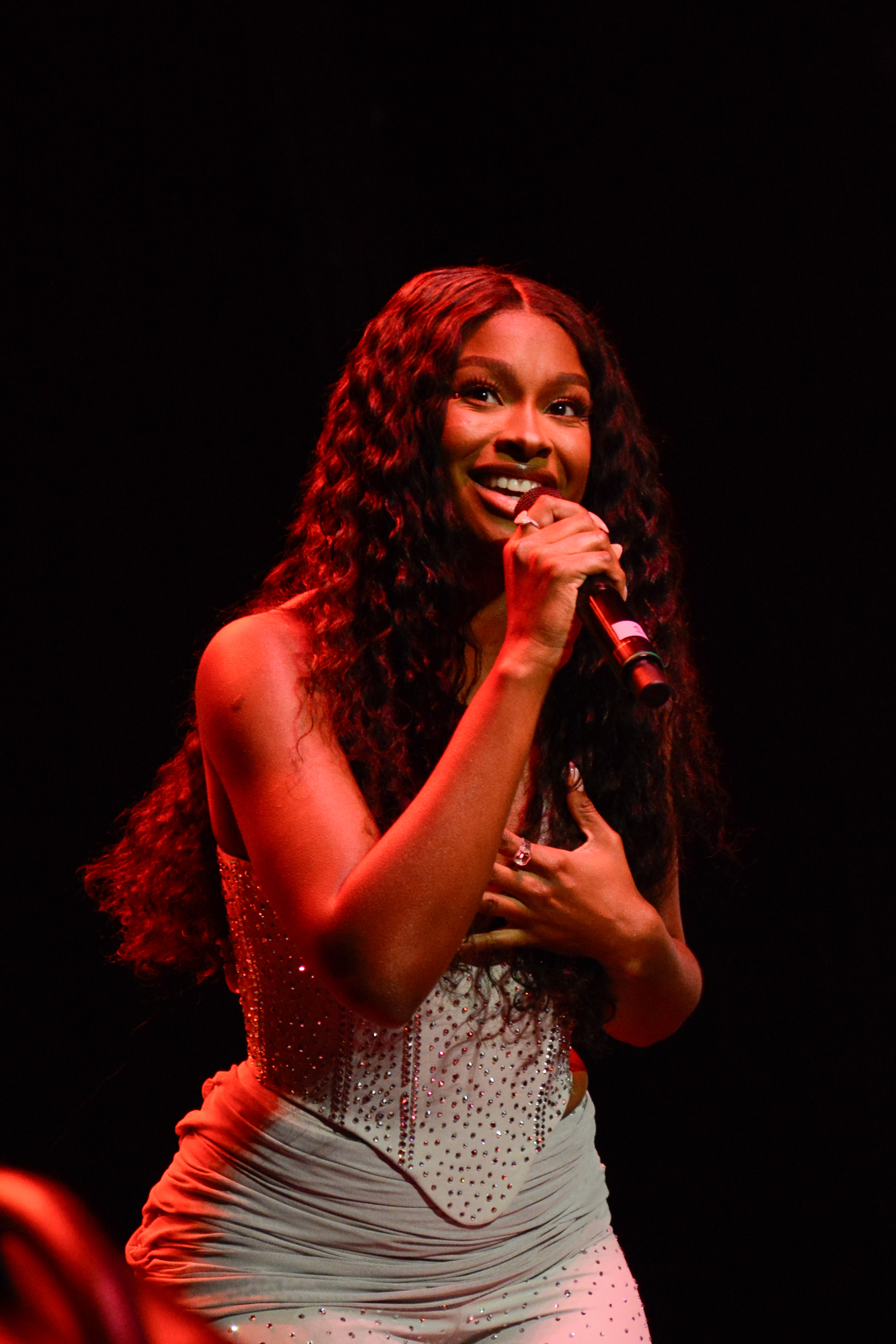
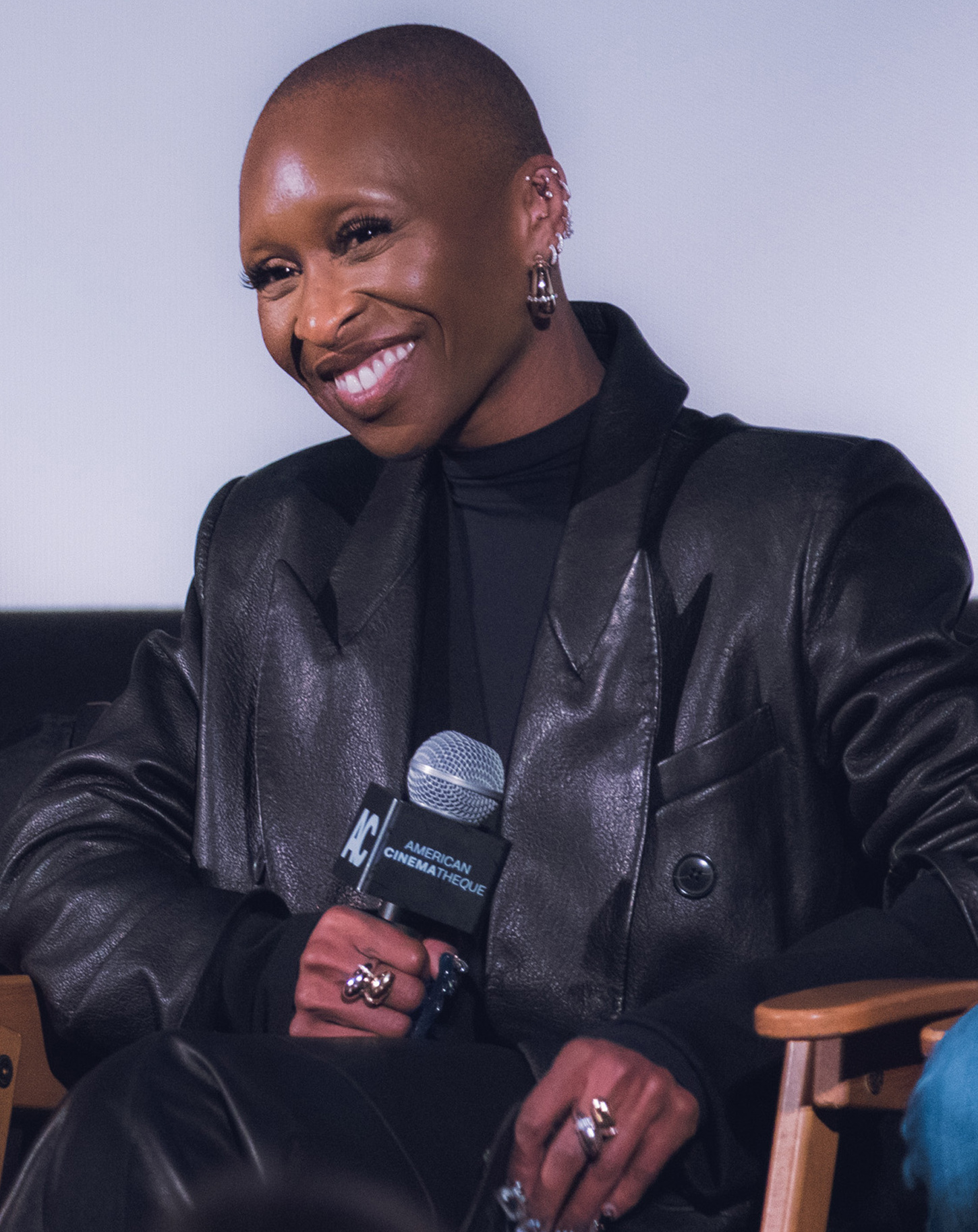
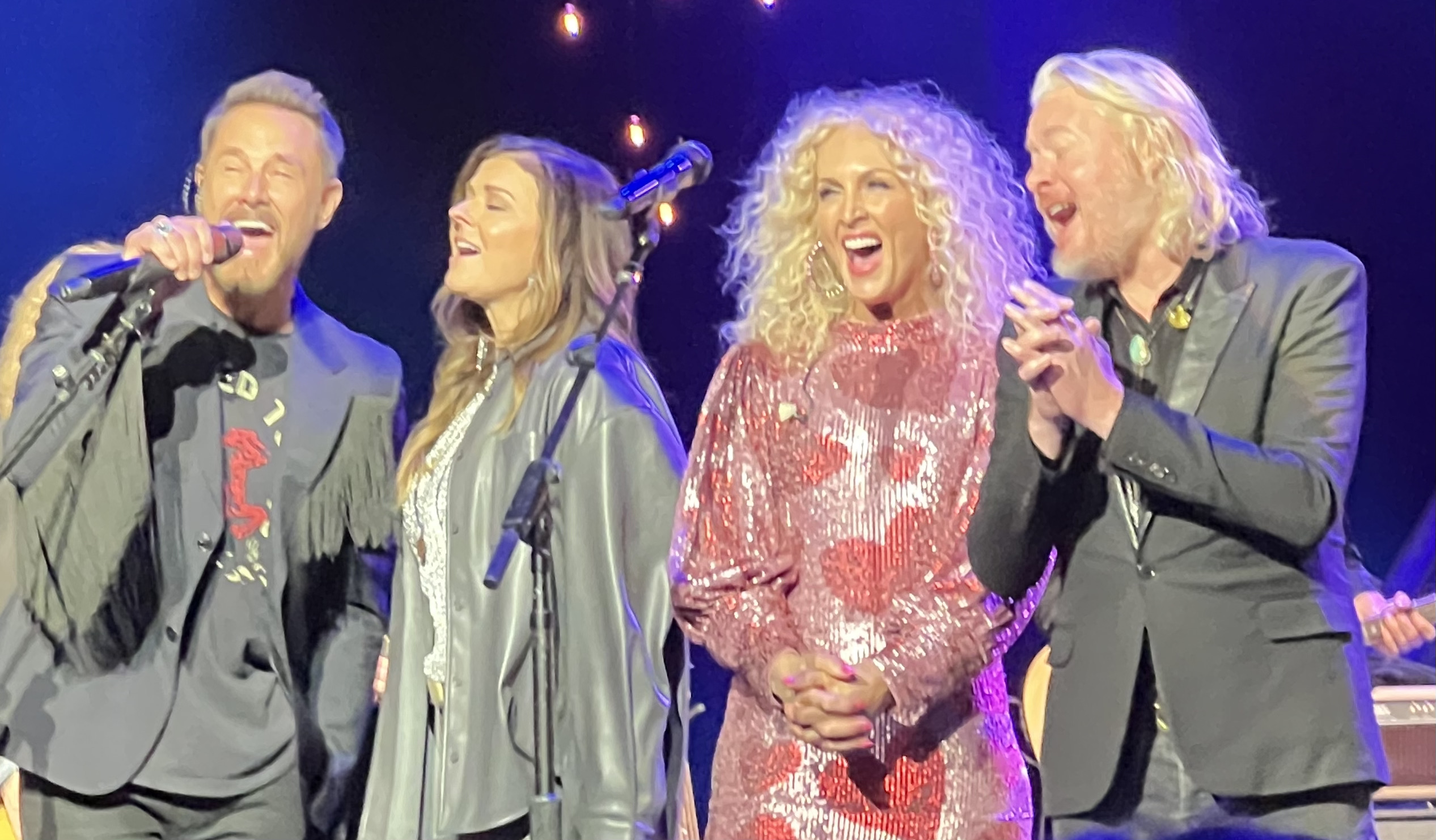
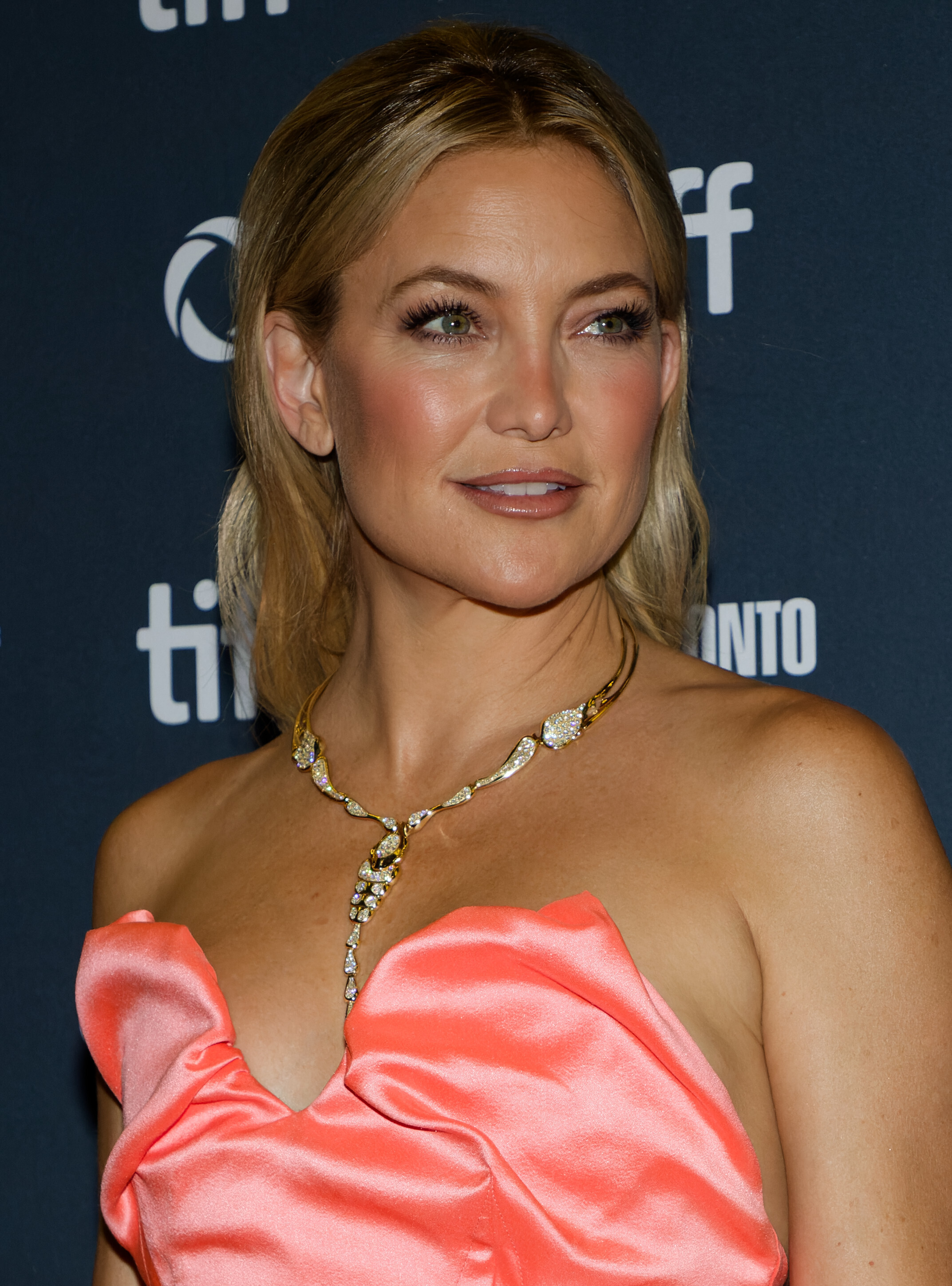
Coco Jones served as an advisor for Team Legend, Cynthia Erivo for Team Bublé, Little Big Town for Team Kelsea, Kate Hudson for Team Adam.

The second stage of the show, the battles, aired from March 10, 2025, to March 24, 2025, consisting of episodes 6 through 8. The advisors for this round were Coco Jones for Team Legend, Cynthia Erivo for Team Bublé, Little Big Town for Team Kelsea, and Kate Hudson for Team Adam. This marks the first time since the twenty-second season that battle advisors were featured.

In this round, the coaches pit two of their artists in a singing match and then select one of them to advance to the next round. Losing artists may be "stolen" by another coach, becoming new members of their team; or can be saved by their coach, remaining a part of their original team. Multiple coaches can attempt to steal an artist, resulting in a competition for the artist, who will ultimately decide which team they will go to. Additionally, their original coach can compete for their artist if they attempt to save them.

At the end of this round, eight artists will remain on each team; six will be battle winners, and one from a steal and a save, respectively. In total, 32 artists advance to the knockouts.

Battles color key
| Artist won the Battle and advanced to the Knockouts |
| Artist lost the Battle, but was stolen by another coach, and advanced to the Knockouts |
| Artist lost the Battle, but was saved by their coach, and advanced to Knockouts |
| Artist lost the Battle and was eliminated |

Battles results
| Episode | Coach | Order | Winner | Song | Loser | 'Steal'/'Save' result | | | |
| Episode | Coach | Order | Winner | Song | Loser | John | Michael | Kelsea | Adam |
|---|---|---|---|---|---|---|---|---|---|
| Episode 6 (Monday, March 10, 2025) | Adam | 1 | Britton Moore | "Creep" | Darius J. | – | ✔ | ✔ | ✔ |
| Episode 6 (Monday, March 10, 2025) | John | 2 | Kolby Cordell | "Tacones Rojos" | Pablo Herrera | – | – | – | – |
| Episode 6 (Monday, March 10, 2025) | Michael | 3 | Jadyn Cree | "Danny's Song" | Braxton Garza | – | – | – | – |
| Episode 6 (Monday, March 10, 2025) | Kelsea | 4 | Angie Rey | "Girl" | Tatum Scott | ✔ | – | – | – |
| Episode 6 (Monday, March 10, 2025) | Adam | 5 | Ethan Eckenroad | "July" | Fran Posla | N/A | – | – | N/A |
| Episode 6 (Monday, March 10, 2025) | John | 6 | Olivia Kuper Harris | "Feel Like Makin' Love" | Nell Simmons | ✔ | – | – | ✔ |
| Episode 7 (Monday, March 17, 2025) | John | 1 | Bryson Battle | "Made for Me" | Ari Camille | Team full | – | ✔ | ✔ |
| Episode 7 (Monday, March 17, 2025) | Adam | 2 | Lucia Flores-Wiseman | "My Funny Valentine" | Hayden Grove | Team full | – | – | Team full |
| Episode 7 (Monday, March 17, 2025) | Adam | 3 | Grace-Miller Moody | "Use Somebody" | Tori Templet | Team full | – | – | Team full |
| Episode 7 (Monday, March 17, 2025) | Kelsea | 4 | Alanna Lynise | "Angels like You" | Brook Wood | Team full | – | – | Team full |
| Episode 7 (Monday, March 17, 2025) | Michael | 5 | Kaiya Hamilton | "Cry to Me" | Barry Jean Fontenot | Team full | ✔ | ✔ | Team full |
| Episode 7 (Monday, March 17, 2025) | Michael | 6 | Kameron Jaso | "You Make My Dreams" | Naomi Soleil | Team full | N/A | – | Team full |
| Episode 7 (Monday, March 17, 2025) | Michael | 7 | Carlos Santiago | "Gravity" | Aaron Rizzo | Team full | N/A | – | Team full |
| Episode 7 (Monday, March 17, 2025) | John | 8 | BD.ii | "Just Friends (Sunny)" | Antonio Ramsey | Team full | – | – | Team full |
| Episode 7 (Monday, March 17, 2025) | Kelsea | 9 | Jaelen Johnston | "Neon Moon" | Hailey Wright | Team full | – | ✔ | Team full |
| Episode 8 (Monday, March 24, 2025) | Kelsea | 1 | Iris Herrera | "Ceilings" | Simone Marijic | Team full | ✔ | N/A | Team full |
| Episode 8 (Monday, March 24, 2025) | Michael | 2 | Divighn | "Leave the Door Open" | Dimitrius Graham | Team full | Team full | – | Team full |
| Episode 8 (Monday, March 24, 2025) | Adam | 3 | Trevon Dawson | "I'm with You" | Tyler Kae | Team full | Team full | – | Team full |
| Episode 8 (Monday, March 24, 2025) | John | 4 | Renzo | "Is This Love" | Jay Ammo | Team full | Team full | – | Team full |
| Episode 8 (Monday, March 24, 2025) | Michael | 5 | Adam David | "Home" | Ricardo Moreno | Team full | Team full | – | Team full |
| Episode 8 (Monday, March 24, 2025) | John | 6 | Jacquelyn George | "Islands in the Stream" | Jordan Allen | Team full | Team full | – | Team full |
| Episode 8 (Monday, March 24, 2025) | Kelsea | 7 | Dan Kiernan | "Good Luck, Babe!" | Jessica Manalo | Team full | Team full | N/A | Team full |
| Episode 8 (Monday, March 24, 2025) | Kelsea | 8 | Page Mackenzie | "Lies Lies Lies" | Robert Hunter | Team full | Team full | N/A | Team full |
| Episode 8 (Monday, March 24, 2025) | Adam | 9 | Conor James | "How Deep Is Your Love" | Tinika Wyatt | Team full | Team full | ✔ | Team full |

== Knockouts ==
The third stage of the show, the knockouts, aired from March 31 to April 14, consisting of episodes 9 through 11. In the round, each coach pairs two of their artists in a singing match. The artists themselves will select the song they will sing in the round, and then their coach selects one of them to advance to the playoffs.

Throughout the round, each coach can steal one losing artist from an opposing team, but do not have the ability to save their artists. At the end of the round, sixteen artists win their knockout, remaining on their teams, while four artists are stolen. In all, a total of 20 artists advanced to the playoffs.

Knockouts color key
| Artist won the knockout and advanced to the playoffs |
| Artist lost the knockout, but was stolen by another coach and advanced to the playoffs |
| Artist lost the knockout and was eliminated |

Knockouts results
| Episode | Coach | Order | Winner | | Loser | | 'Steal' result | | | |
| Episode | Coach | Order | Song | Artist | Artist | Song | John | Michael | Kelsea | Adam |
|---|---|---|---|---|---|---|---|---|---|---|
| Episode 9 (Monday, March 31, 2025) | John | 1 | "Back at One" | BD.ii | Kolby Cordell | "Lately" | N/A | ✔ | – | ✔ |
| Episode 9 (Monday, March 31, 2025) | Adam | 2 | "Slow It Down" | Lucia Flores-Wiseman | Grace-Miller Moody | "Dreams" | – | – | – | Team full |
| Episode 9 (Monday, March 31, 2025) | Kelsea | 3 | "Best of My Love" | Tinika Wyatt | Dan Kiernan | "Impossible" | – | – | N/A | Team full |
| Episode 9 (Monday, March 31, 2025) | Michael | 4 | "Haven't Met You Yet" | Barry Jean Fontenot | Simone Marijic | "She Used to Be Mine" | – | N/A | – | Team full |
| Episode 9 (Monday, March 31, 2025) | Adam | 5 | "I Won't Back Down" | Ethan Eckenroad | Trevon Dawson | "Red Dirt Road" | – | – | – | Team full |
| Episode 9 (Monday, March 31, 2025) | Kelsea | 6 | "Jolene" | Iris Herrera | Angie Rey | "Dirt Cheap" | – | ✔ | N/A | Team full |
| Episode 10 (Monday, April 7, 2025) | Michael | 1 | "Here" | Kaiya Hamilton | Divighn | "Harder to Breathe" | – | Team full | – | Team full |
| Episode 10 (Monday, April 7, 2025) | John | 2 | "Ain't No Way" | Bryson Battle | Tatum Scott | "Stick Season" | N/A | Team full | – | Team full |
| Episode 10 (Monday, April 7, 2025) | Kelsea | 3 | "I'll Never Love Again" | Alanna Lynise | Page Mackenzie | "You're Still the One" | – | Team full | N/A | Team full |
| Episode 10 (Monday, April 7, 2025) | Adam | 4 | "Free" | Britton Moore | Ari Camille | "Love Like This" | ✔ | Team full | – | Team full |
| Episode 11 (Monday, April 14, 2025) | John | 1 | "Happier Than Ever" | Renzo | Nell Simmons | "Sweet Thing" | Team full | Team full | – | Team full |
| Episode 11 (Monday, April 14, 2025) | Michael | 2 | "Unaware" | Adam David | Carlos Santiago | "You Are the Reason" | Team full | Team full | – | Team full |
| Episode 11 (Monday, April 14, 2025) | Kelsea | 3 | "Dial Drunk" | Jaelen Johnston | Hailey Wright | "I Want to Be a Cowboy's Sweetheart" | Team full | Team full | N/A | Team full |
| Episode 11 (Monday, April 14, 2025) | John | 4 | "Last Dance" | Olivia Kuper Harris | Jacquelyn George | "Too Little Too Late" | Team full | Team full | – | Team full |
| Episode 11 (Monday, April 14, 2025) | Michael | 5 | "Keep Holding On" | Jadyn Cree | Kameron Jaso | "Say You Won't Let Go" | Team full | Team full | – | Team full |
| Episode 11 (Monday, April 14, 2025) | Adam | 6 | "Forever Young" | Conor James | Darius J. | "American Boy" | Team full | Team full | ✔ | Team full |

== Playoffs ==
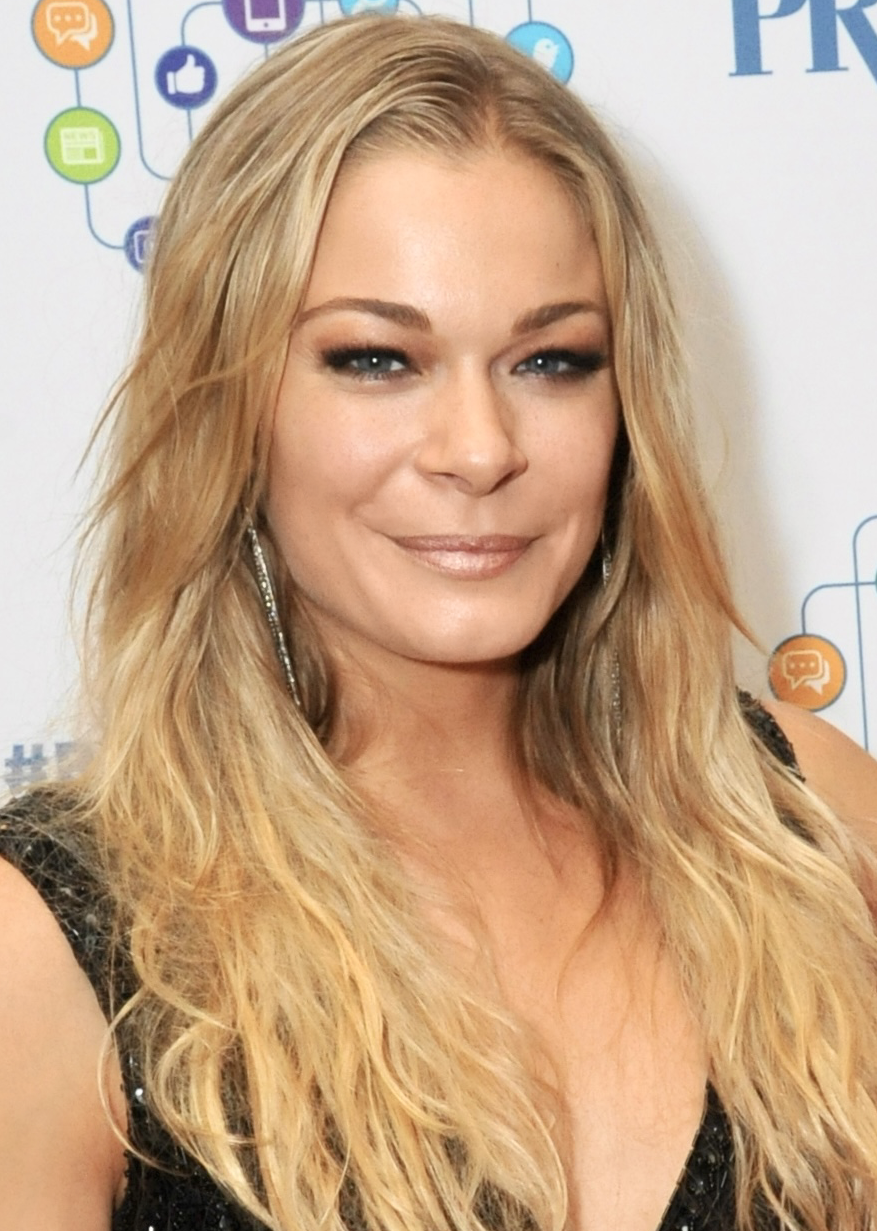
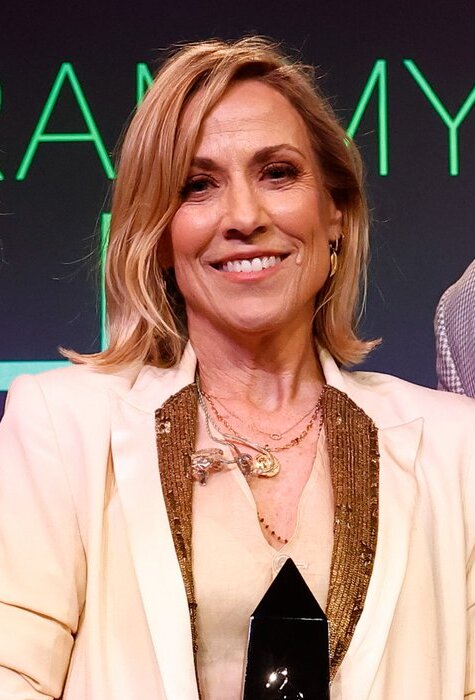
LeAnn Rimes served as mega mentor for Teams Adam and Legend, and Sheryl Crow served as mega mentor for Teams Bublé and Kelsea.

The fourth stage of the show, the playoffs, aired from April 28 to May 4, consisting of episodes 12 through 14. The top 20 artists perform for the coaches with a song of their choosing. At the end of the round, each coach selects two of their artists to advance, creating a total of 8 playoff artists advancing to the live shows, just like season 23 and the previous season. However, each coach is also granted a 'super save', last used in season 24. While it was originally reported that each coach could bring one formerly eliminated artist, regardless of any team, the rules were changed so that it must be from their own playoff team, for the live shows. In total, 12 artists will advance to live shows.

Like seasons 6, 13 and 23–26, the playoffs were not contested live. They were prerecorded and taped at the same stage as the prior two rounds, hence the lack of an interactive viewer voting component or a subsequent results episode. Teams Adam and Kelsea performed on the first episode, while Teams Bublé and Legend performed on the second episode.

This round features two mega mentors dubbed "playoff advisors". Former Voice Australia and Voice UK coach LeAnn Rimes served as mega mentor for Teams Adam and Legend, and Sheryl Crow served as mega mentor for Teams Bublé and Kelsea.

Playoffs color key
| Artist was chosen by their coach to move on to the live semifinals |
| Artist was originally eliminated, but received the 'super save' and advanced to the semifinals |
| Artist was eliminated |

Playoffs results
| Episode | Coach | Order | Artist | Song | Result |
|---|---|---|---|---|---|
| Episode 13 (Monday, April 28, 2025) | Kelsea Ballerini | 1 | Iris Herrera | "White Horse" | Advanced |
| Episode 13 (Monday, April 28, 2025) | Adam Levine | 2 | Lucia Flores-Wiseman | "In My Life" | Advanced |
| Episode 13 (Monday, April 28, 2025) | Kelsea Ballerini | 3 | Jaelen Johnston | "If You're Reading This" | Advanced |
| Episode 13 (Monday, April 28, 2025) | Adam Levine | 4 | Conor James | "Pink Pony Club" | Advanced |
| Episode 13 (Monday, April 28, 2025) | Kelsea Ballerini | 5 | Alanna Lynise | "Nobody Gets Me" | Advanced |
| Episode 13 (Monday, April 28, 2025) | Adam Levine | 6 | Kolby Cordell | "Finesse" | Advanced |
| Episode 13 (Monday, April 28, 2025) | Kelsea Ballerini | 7 | Tinika Wyatt | "I Can Only Imagine" | Eliminated |
| Episode 13 (Monday, April 28, 2025) | Adam Levine | 8 | Ethan Eckenroad | "The Night We Met" | Eliminated |
| Episode 13 (Monday, April 28, 2025) | Kelsea Ballerini | 9 | Darius J. | "Hey Ya!" | Eliminated |
| Episode 13 (Monday, April 28, 2025) | Adam Levine | 10 | Britton Moore | "Somewhere Only We Know" | Eliminated |
| Episode 14 (Monday, May 5, 2025) | Michael Bublé | 1 | Kaiya Hamilton | "If You Love Somebody Set Them Free" | Advanced |
| Episode 14 (Monday, May 5, 2025) | John Legend | 2 | Bryson Battle | "POV" | Advanced |
| Episode 14 (Monday, May 5, 2025) | Michael Bublé | 3 | Angie Rey | "How Do I Live" | Eliminated |
| Episode 14 (Monday, May 5, 2025) | John Legend | 4 | BD.ii | "All My Life" | Eliminated |
| Episode 14 (Monday, May 5, 2025) | Michael Bublé | 5 | Jadyn Cree | "99 Red Balloons" | Advanced |
| Episode 14 (Monday, May 5, 2025) | John Legend | 6 | Olivia Kuper Harris | "What Was I Made For?" | Advanced |
| Episode 14 (Monday, May 5, 2025) | Michael Bublé | 7 | Barry Jean Fontenot | "Until I Found You" | Eliminated |
| Episode 14 (Monday, May 5, 2025) | John Legend | 8 | Ari Camille | "Rain" | Eliminated |
| Episode 14 (Monday, May 5, 2025) | Michael Bublé | 9 | Adam David | "I Shall Be Released" | Advanced |
| Episode 14 (Monday, May 5, 2025) | John Legend | 10 | Renzo | "Too Sweet" | Advanced |

== Live shows ==
=== Week 1: Top 12 – Semi-finals (May 12–13) ===
The Top 12 performances comprised episodes 15 through 16. The Top 12 artists, three from each team, performed on Monday, with the results following on Tuesday. The top four artists were saved by the public's vote, while the four artists with the fewest votes were immediately eliminated in the competition and the middle four contended for the remaining spot in next week's finals via the Instant Save. This is the first season since season 17 where the bottom artists are instantly eliminated and the middle artists compete for the Instant Save.

With the advancement of Jaelen Johnston, Kelsea Ballerini became the thirteenth new coach to successfully bring their team to the finale, the first being Usher (Michelle Chamuel in the fourth season), the second being Alicia Keys (Wé McDonald in the eleventh season), the third being Kelly Clarkson (Brynn Cartelli in the fourteenth season), the fourth being John Legend (Maelyn Jarmon in the sixteenth season), the fifth being Nick Jonas (Thunderstorm Artis in the eighteenth season), the sixth being Camila Cabello (Morgan Myles in the twenty-second season), the seventh being Chance the Rapper (Sorelle in the twenty-third season), the eighth being Niall Horan (Gina Miles also in the twenty-third season), the ninth being Reba McEntire (Ruby Leigh and Jacquie Roar in the twenty-fourth season), the tenth being Dan + Shay (Karen Waldrup in the twenty-fifth season), the eleventh being Michael Bublé (Sofronio Vasquez and Shye in the twenty-sixth season), and the twelfth being Snoop Dogg (Jeremy Beloate also in the twenty-sixth season). Additionally, Johnston also becomes the first 'super save' recipient to make it to the finale. Also, this season marks the first time in non-guaranteed back-to-back seasons that each coach has at least one artist to represent them at the finale (seventh overall time). Additionally, with the advancement of Lucia Flores-Wiseman, this is the first time since the thirteenth season that Adam Levine has an artist representing his team in the finale. With the advancements of Jadyn Cree and Adam David, this is the second consecutive season where Michael Bublé has two artists representing his team in the finale, following Sofronio Vasquez and Shye in the previous season. Additionally, Bublé became the second coach, after Reba McEntire to bring two artists to the finals in their respective first two seasons.

Live shows color key
| Artist was saved by public's vote |
| Artist was placed in the middle four and competed for an Instant Save |
| Artist was instantly saved |
| Artist was eliminated |

Semi-finals results
| Episode | Coach | Order | Artist | Song | Result |
|---|---|---|---|---|---|
| Episode 15 (Monday, May 12, 2025) | Adam Levine | 1 | Kolby Cordell | "Drink You Away" | Eliminated |
| Episode 15 (Monday, May 12, 2025) | Kelsea Ballerini | 2 | Alanna Lynise | "I'm Not That Girl" | Eliminated |
| Episode 15 (Monday, May 12, 2025) | Michael Bublé | 3 | Jadyn Cree | "I Think We're Alone Now" | Public's vote |
| Episode 15 (Monday, May 12, 2025) | John Legend | 4 | Olivia Kuper Harris | "Someone to Watch Over Me" | Middle four |
| Episode 15 (Monday, May 12, 2025) | Kelsea Ballerini | 5 | Iris Herrera | "Messy" | Middle four |
| Episode 15 (Monday, May 12, 2025) | Adam Levine | 6 | Lucia Flores-Wiseman | "Black Hole Sun" | Public's vote |
| Episode 15 (Monday, May 12, 2025) | John Legend | 7 | Bryson Battle | "Without You" | Middle four |
| Episode 15 (Monday, May 12, 2025) | Kelsea Ballerini | 8 | Jaelen Johnston | "I Drive Your Truck" | Public's vote |
| Episode 15 (Monday, May 12, 2025) | Michael Bublé | 9 | Adam David | "Bring It On Home to Me" | Middle four |
| Episode 15 (Monday, May 12, 2025) | Michael Bublé | 10 | Kaiya Hamilton | "Ain't Nobody" | Eliminated |
| Episode 15 (Monday, May 12, 2025) | Adam Levine | 11 | Conor James | "Chasing Pavements" | Eliminated |
| Episode 15 (Monday, May 12, 2025) | John Legend | 12 | Renzo | "Dream On" | Public's vote |
| Episode 16 (Tuesday, May 13, 2025) | John Legend | 1 | Olivia Kuper Harris | "Rainbow" | Eliminated |
| Episode 16 (Tuesday, May 13, 2025) | Michael Bublé | 2 | Adam David | "Lose Control" | Instantly saved |
| Episode 16 (Tuesday, May 13, 2025) | Kelsea Ballerini | 3 | Iris Herrera | "Rocket Man" | Eliminated |
| Episode 16 (Tuesday, May 13, 2025) | John Legend | 4 | Bryson Battle | "Talking to the Moon" | Eliminated |

Non-competition performances
| Order | Performers | Song |
|---|---|---|
| 16.1 | John Legend | "So High" |
| 16.2 | Kelsea Ballerini | "Baggage" |

=== Week 2: Finale (May 19–20) ===
The season finale ran through two nights, Monday and Tuesday, May 19 through 20, 2025, comprising episodes 17 through 19. The Top 5 performed on Monday, with each artist performing an up-tempo song and a ballad for the title of The Voice. At the episode's conclusion, the overnight voting for the season's winner began. The following night, on Tuesday, the finalists performed a duet with their respective coaches before the results of the public vote were announced, and the winner of the season was named.

Adam David was named the winner of the season, marking Michael Bublé's second win as a coach, with Bublé becoming the fourth coach to win multiple consecutive seasons, following Blake Shelton's consecutive wins from seasons 2 to 4, Kelly Clarkson's consecutive wins in seasons 14 and 15, and Niall Horan's consecutive wins in seasons 23 and 24. With David's win, Bublé became the third coach (after Clarkson and Horan) to win their first two seasons. David is also the second winning artist to be saved by the Instant Save, following Bryce Leatherwood in season 22. Additionally, David became the third winner in the history of the show to have been a one-chair turn in blind auditions, following Chris Blue and Jake Hoot in seasons 12 and 17, respectively, the second outright where every coach could turn after Hoot in season 17, and the first to do so with a male coach, that of Bublé. This was the second time after season 14, where the final two artists were on teams of the coaches in the "middle chairs".

Finale results
| Coach | Artist | Episode 17(Monday, May 19, 2025) | | | | Episode 19(Tuesday, May 20, 2025) | | Result |
| Coach | Artist | Order | Up-tempo song | Order | Ballad | Order | Duet (with coach) | Result |
|---|---|---|---|---|---|---|---|---|
| John Legend | Renzo | 1 | "Fly Away" | 9 | "Lover, You Should've Come Over" | 11 | "As It Was" | Third place |
| Adam Levine | Lucia Flores-Wiseman | 2 | "Wish You Were Here" | 6 | "Wildflower" | 14 | "While My Guitar Gently Weeps" | Fourth place |
| Michael Bublé | Jadyn Cree | 8 | "Come On Eileen" | 3 | "Lose You to Love Me" | 15 | "I Got You Babe" | Fifth place |
| Kelsea Ballerini | Jaelen Johnston | 4 | "What Was I Thinkin'" | 10 | "Cold" | 12 | "Whiskey Lullaby" | Runner-up |
| Michael Bublé | Adam David | 7 | "Hard Fought Hallelujah" | 5 | "You Are So Beautiful" | 13 | "The Weight" | Winner |

Non-competition performances
| Order | Performers | Song |
|---|---|---|
| 17.1 | Michael Bublé | "I've Got the World on a String" |
| 17.2 | Maelyn Jarmon | "dreamboat" |
| 19.1 | Foreigner | "Feels Like the First Time" / "Juke Box Hero" / "I Want to Know What Love Is" |
| 19.2 | Kelly Clarkson | "Where Have You Been" |
| 19.3 | Bryce Leatherwood | "God Made" |
| 19.4 | Chance the Rapper | "Space & Time" |
| 19.5 | Joe Jonas | "Heart by Heart" |
| 19.6 | James Bay and Sheryl Crow | "You and Me Time" |
| 19.7 | Top 12 Artists (minus Olivia Kuper Harris) | "Pompeii" |
| 19.8 | Alicia Keys ft. Amanda Reid | "The River" / "Empire State of Mind" |
| 19.9 | Blake Shelton | "Texas" |

== Elimination chart ==
Results color key
| Winner | Saved by an instant save (via Voice App) |
| Runner-up | Saved by the public |
| Third place | Saved by their coach |
| Fourth place | Selected by coach as their 'super save' |
| Fifth place | Eliminated |

Coaches color key
| Team Legend |
| Team Bublé |
| Team Kelsea |
| Team Adam |

=== Overall ===
Elimination chart for The Voice season 27
| Artists | Playoffs | Semi-final | Finale |
|---|---|---|---|
| Adam David | Safe | Safe | Winner |
| Jaelen Johnston | Safe | Safe | Runner-up |
| Renzo | Safe | Safe | Third place |
| Lucia Flores-Wiseman | Safe | Safe | Fourth place |
| Jadyn Cree | Safe | Safe | Fifth place |
| Bryson Battle | Safe | Eliminated | Eliminated (Semi-final) |
| Iris Herrera | Safe | Eliminated | Eliminated (Semi-final) |
| Olivia Kuper Harris | Safe | Eliminated | Eliminated (Semi-final) |
| Kolby Cordell | Safe | Eliminated | Eliminated (Semi-final) |
| Kaiya Hamilton | Safe | Eliminated | Eliminated (Semi-final) |
| Conor James | Safe | Eliminated | Eliminated (Semi-final) |
| Alanna Lynise | Safe | Eliminated | Eliminated (Semi-final) |
| BD.ii | Eliminated | Eliminated (Playoffs) | |
| Ari Camille | Eliminated | Eliminated (Playoffs) | |
| Ethan Eckenroad | Eliminated | Eliminated (Playoffs) | |
| Barry Jean Fontenot | Eliminated | Eliminated (Playoffs) | |
| Darius J. | Eliminated | Eliminated (Playoffs) | |
| Britton Moore | Eliminated | Eliminated (Playoffs) | |
| Angie Rey | Eliminated | Eliminated (Playoffs) | |
| Tinika Wyatt | Eliminated | Eliminated (Playoffs) | |

=== Per team ===
Elimination chart for The Voice season 27 per team
| Artists | Playoffs | Semi-final | Finale |
|---|---|---|---|
| Renzo | Advanced | Advanced | Third place |
| Bryson Battle | Advanced | Eliminated | |
| Olivia Kuper Harris | Advanced | Eliminated | |
| BD.ii | Eliminated | | |
| Ari Camille | Eliminated | | |
| Adam David | Advanced | Advanced | Winner |
| Jadyn Cree | Advanced | Advanced | Fifth place |
| Kaiya Hamilton | Advanced | Eliminated | |
| Barry Jean Fontenot | Eliminated | | |
| Angie Rey | Eliminated | | |
| Jaelen Johnston | Advanced | Advanced | Runner-up |
| Iris Herrera | Advanced | Eliminated | |
| Alanna Lynise | Advanced | Eliminated | |
| Darius J. | Eliminated | | |
| Tinika Wyatt | Eliminated | | |
| Lucia Flores-Wiseman | Advanced | Advanced | Fourth place |
| Kolby Cordell | Advanced | Eliminated | |
| Conor James | Advanced | Eliminated | |
| Ethan Eckenroad | Eliminated | | |
| Britton Moore | Eliminated | | |

== Ratings ==
Viewership and ratings per episode of The Voice season 27
| No. | Title | Air date | Timeslot (ET) | Rating (18–49) | Viewers (millions) | DVR (18–49) | DVR viewers (millions) | Total (18–49) | Total viewers (millions) | Ref. |
|---|---|---|---|---|---|---|---|---|---|---|
| 1 | "The Blind Auditions, Season Premiere" | February 3, 2025 | Monday 8:00 p.m. | 0.5 | 5.68 | 0.1 | 1.19 | 0.6 | 6.88 | |
| 2 | "The Blind Auditions, Part 2" | February 10, 2025 | Monday 8:00 p.m. | 0.5 | 5.93 | 0.1 | 1.16 | 0.6 | 7.09 | |
| 3 | "The Blind Auditions, Part 3" | February 17, 2025 | Monday 8:00 p.m. | 0.5 | 6.07 | 0.1 | 1.15 | 0.6 | 7.22 | |
| 4 | "The Blind Auditions, Part 4" | February 24, 2025 | Monday 8:00 p.m. | 0.5 | 5.96 | 0.1 | 1.19 | 0.6 | 7.15 | |
| 5 | "The Blind Auditions, Part 5" | March 3, 2025 | Monday 8:00 p.m. | 0.4 | 5.65 | 0.1 | 1.09 | 0.5 | 6.74 | |
| 6 | "The Battles Premiere" | March 10, 2025 | Monday 8:00 p.m. | 0.4 | 5.47 | 0.1 | 1.04 | 0.5 | 6.51 | |
| 7 | "The Battles Part 2" | March 17, 2025 | Monday 8:00 p.m. | 0.4 | 5.24 | 0.1 | 1.05 | 0.5 | 6.29 | |
| 8 | "The Battles Part 3" | March 24, 2025 | Monday 8:00 p.m. | 0.4 | 4.93 | 0.1 | 0.99 | 0.5 | 5.92 | |
| 9 | "The Knockouts Premiere" | March 31, 2025 | Monday 8:00 p.m. | 0.3 | 4.57 | TBD | TBD | TBD | TBD | |
| 10 | "The Knockouts Part 2" | April 7, 2025 | Monday 9:00 p.m. | 0.2 | 3.32 | TBD | TBD | TBD | TBD | |
| 11 | "The Knockouts Part 3" | April 14, 2025 | Monday 8:00 p.m. | 0.3 | 4.14 | TBD | TBD | TBD | TBD | |
| 12 | "Road to Playoffs" | April 21, 2025 | Monday 8:00 p.m. | 0.2 | 2.57 | TBD | TBD | TBD | TBD | |
| 13 | "The Playoffs Premiere" | April 28, 2025 | Monday 8:00 p.m. | 0.3 | 3.69 | TBD | TBD | TBD | TBD | |
| 14 | "The Playoffs Part 2" | May 5, 2025 | Monday 8:00 p.m. | 0.2 | 3.51 | TBD | TBD | TBD | TBD | |
| 15 | "Live Semi-Final Performances" | May 12, 2025 | Monday 8:00 p.m. | 0.2 | 3.30 | TBD | TBD | TBD | TBD | |
| 16 | "Live Semi-Final Results" | May 13, 2025 | Tuesday 9:00 p.m. | 0.2 | 3.58 | TBD | TBD | TBD | TBD | |
| 17 | "Live Finale, Part 1" | May 19, 2025 | Monday 8:00 p.m. | 0.4 | 4.79 | TBD | TBD | TBD | TBD | |
| 18 | "Live: Recap Finale Performances" | May 20, 2025 | Tuesday 8:00 p.m. | 0.3 | 3.05 | TBD | TBD | TBD | TBD | |
| 19 | "Live Finale, Part 2" | May 20, 2025 | Tuesday 9:00 p.m. | 0.3 | 4.25 | TBD | TBD | TBD | TBD | |
