= The Music Is You: A Tribute to John Denver =

The Music Is You: A Tribute To John Denver

Compilation album by various artists
- Released: April 2, 2013
- Genre: Country, folk, rock, alternative
- Length: 59:59
- Label: ATO

The Music Is You: A Tribute To John Denver is an album consisting of songs originally performed by country and folk singer-songwriter John Denver. It was released on April 2, 2013 by ATO Records. Denver died in October 1997 when the single engine plane he was piloting crashed off the coast of California. The album has been praised by some as a way to help Denver's catalogue reach a new, younger audience.

== Track listing ==
1. "Leaving on a Jet Plane" – My Morning Jacket
2. "Take Me to Tomorrow" – Dave Matthews
3. "All of My Memories" – Kathleen Edwards
4. "Prisoners" – J Mascis and Sharon Van Etten
5. "Sunshine on My Shoulders" – Train
6. "Back Home Again" – Old Crow Medicine Show
7. "This Old Guitar" – Lucinda Williams
8. "Some Days Are Diamonds" – Amos Lee
9. "Rocky Mountain High" – Allen Stone
10. "Annie's Song" – Brett Dennen and Milow
11. "Looking For Space" – Evan Dando
12. "Take Me Home, Country Roads" – Brandi Carlile and Emmylou Harris
13. "The Eagle and the Hawk" – Blind Pilot
14. "I Guess He'd Rather Be in Colorado" – Mary Chapin Carpenter
15. "Darcy Farrow" – Josh Ritter and Barnstar!
16. "Wooden Indian" – Edward Sharpe and the Magnetic Zeros

== Personnel ==
- "Leaving on a Jet Plane"
  - Produced, mixed, engineered by Jim James
  - Performed by My Morning Jacket
- "Take Me to Tomorrow"
  - Produced by Dave Matthews
  - Engineered by Rob Evans
  - Vocals and guitar by Dave Matthews
- "All Of My Memories"
  - Produced by Jim James
  - Engineered by Kevin Ratterman
  - Mixed by Kevin Ratterman and Jim James
  - Lead vocal by Kathleen Edwards
  - Background vocal by Jim James
  - Drums, piano, acoustic guitar, violin, bass and FX by Kevin Ratterman
- "Prisoners"
  - Performed by J Mascis and Sharon Van Etten
  - Mixed by Mark Alan Miller
  - Recorded by Mark Allen Miller and Aaron Dessner
- "Sunshine On My Shoulders"
  - Produced by Train and Ross Petersen
  - Engineered and mixed by Ross Petersen
  - Additional percussion by Ross Petersen
  - Mastered by Ryan Smith
- "Back Home Again"
  - Banjo and vocals by Critter Fuqua
  - Guitjo and vocals by Kevin Haynes
  - Bass and vocals by Morgan Jahnig
  - Dobro and vocals by Gill Landry
  - Guitar and vocals by Chance Mccoy
  - Fiddle and lead vocals by Ketch Secor
  - Mandolin and vocals by Cory Younts
- "This Old Guitar"
  - Vocals and acoustic guitar by Lucinda Williams
  - Electric guitar by Doug Pettibone
  - Bass by David Sutton
  - Drums by Butch Norton
- "Some Days Are Diamonds"
  - Guitar and vocals by Amos Lee
  - Recorded by Chris Allen
- "Rocky Mountain High"
  - Engineered by Chris Rahm
  - Vocals and guitar by Allen Stone
  - Guitars by Trevor Larkin
  - Bass by Brent Rusinow
- "Annie's Song"
  - Recorded, mixed, and produced by John Alagia
  - Engineered by Brad Conrad
  - Vocals, electric & acoustic guitar, ukulele and xylophone by Brett Dennen
  - Bass, percussion, and pump organ by John Alagia
  - Vocals by Milow
- "Looking For Space"
  - Recorded, engineered, and produced by Jimmy Parr
  - Lead vocals and guitars by Evan Dando
  - Bass by Jimmy Parr
  - Drums by Chris Anzalone
  - Background vocals by Christian Mcneill and Erich Leuning
- "Take Me Home, Country Roads"
  - Produced, recorded, and engineered by Brandi Carlile, The Twins, and Buddy Miller
  - Mixed by Trina Shoemaker
  - Vocals, organ, piano, and percussion by Brandi Carlile
  - Vocals by Emmylou Harris
  - Bass, percussion, and vocals by Phil Hanseroth
  - Guitars, percussion, and vocals by Tim Hanseroth
- "The Eagle And The Hawk"
  - Produced and recorded by Israel Nebeker
  - Mixed by Jesse Lauter
  - Vocals, ukulele and electric guitar by Israel Nebeker
  - Drums by Ryan Dobrowski
  - Double Bass, harmonium, baritone ukulele, and vocals by Luke Ydstie
  - Mountain dulcimer and vocals by Kati Claborn
- "I Guess He'd Rather Be In Colorado"
  - Produced by Mary Chapin Carpenter
  - Recorded and mixed by John Jennings
  - Mastered by Mike Monseur
  - Vocals and acoustic guitar by Mary Chapin Carpenter
  - Electric guitar and upright bass by John Jennings
- "Darcy Farrow"
  - Produced by Zachariah Hickman
  - Arranged by Josh Ritter and Barnstar!
  - Recorded and mixed by Dan Cardinal
  - Fiddle by Jake Armerding
  - Mandolin by Taylor Armerding
  - Guitar and harmony vocals by Mark Erelli
  - Upright bass by Zachariah Hickman
  - Guitar and vocals by Josh Ritter
  - Banjo by Charlie Rose
- "Wooden Indian"
  - Performed by Edward Sharpe and the Magnetic Zeros
- Additional personnel
  - Produced by Brian Schwartz and Jon Salter
  - Mastered by Greg Calbi
  - John Denver estate management by Brian Schwartz and Amy Abrams
  - John Denver estate business management by Howard Grossman and Eric Wasserman
  - John Denver estate legal representation by Jay Cooper
  - Product management by Kirby Lee
  - Art direction and design by Michael Carney
  - Photography courtesy of the John Denver estate

== Chart performance ==
Chart (2013)	Peak position
US Billboard 200	37
US Billboard Top Country Albums	12
US Billboard Top Folk Albums	3
US Billboard Top Rock Albums	10
US Billboard Independent Albums	10
