= Allen Stone =

American musician (born 1987)

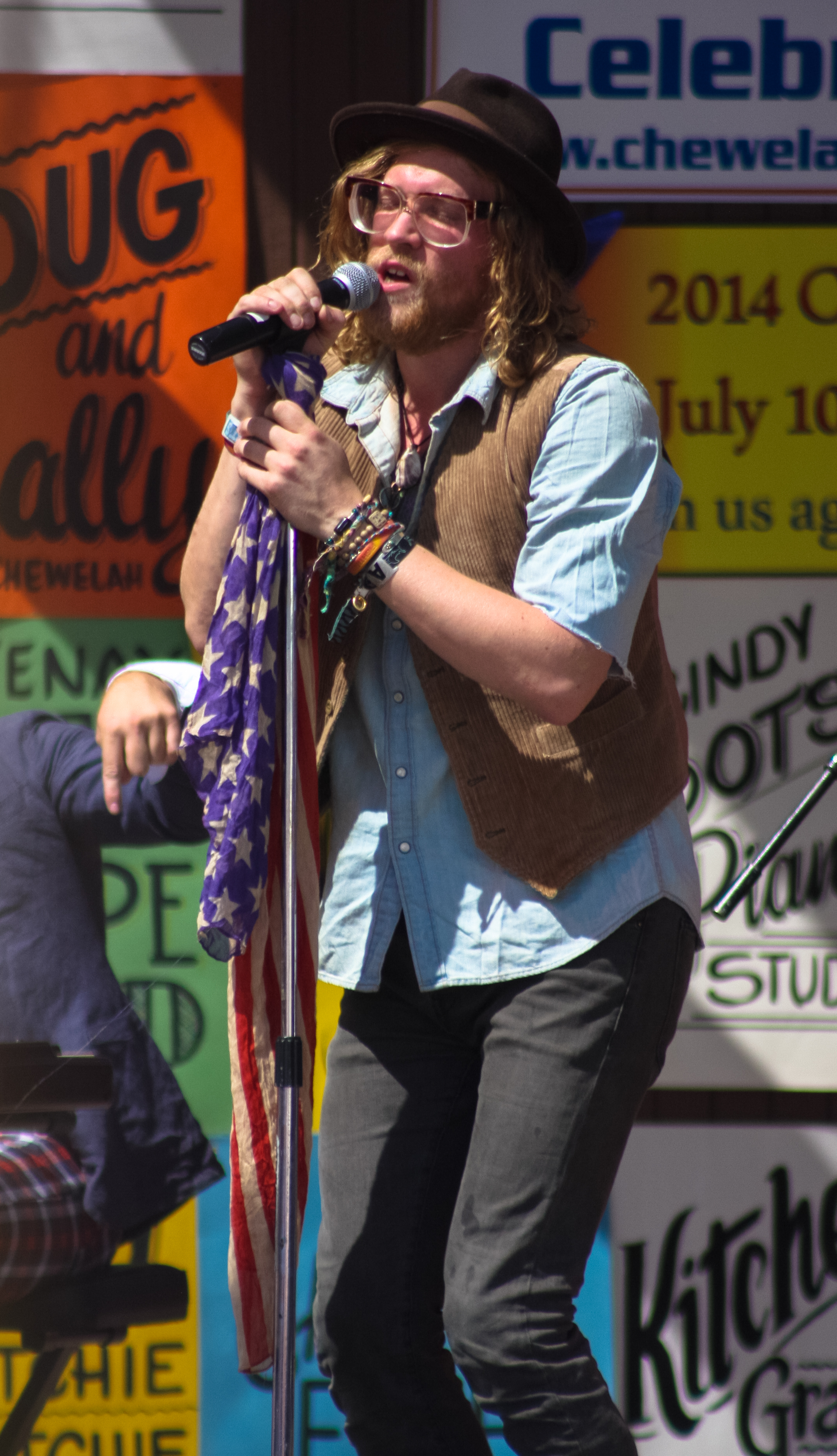
- Stone performing in 2013

Background information
- Born: March 13, 1987 (age 39); Chewelah, Washington, U.S.
- Genres: Soul; blue-eyed soul; R&B
- Occupations: Singer; songwriter; musician
- Instruments: Vocals; guitar; piano; keyboards
- Years active: 2010–present
- Labels: ATO; MapleMusic
- Website: allenstone.com

Allen Stone (born March 13, 1987) is an American singer, songwriter, and musician based in Seattle. His musical style spans genres including soul and R&B. Stone has released five studio albums and two extended plays, with his latest album Apart released in 2021.

== Early life ==
Stone was born on March 13, 1987, in Chewelah, Washington, near Spokane. He began his career singing at his father's church. His father was a preacher and his mother was an OB/GYN nurse. He began singing in church at age 3.

By age 14, Stone was leading worship at his church and playing the guitar. The draw of music for Allen was mainly being able to express himself to a crowd of people.

Allen did not discover soul music until he was a teenager, and he started collecting classic albums from the 1960s and 1970s. He was 15 when he heard the Stevie Wonder album Innervisions (1973).

When Stacie Orrico, a close friend of Allen's as a teen, became successful in music, Stone decided to become serious about his musical career. Stone related how Orrico had released a record and become successful:

"She was traveling, singing everywhere, and recording. She was just a year older than me and I was like, 'Man that would be so much fun to do, sing and actually have people listen.'"

When Stone was 18, he moved to Spokane, where he attended community college for a semester followed by a year at Moody Bible Institute in Spokane. After that year, Stone had an epiphany. He stated in an interview with SF Gate:

"I learned the history of the church and the conception of the Bible and learned about the religion and really just, like, didn't believe it... I got to the point where it was like, 'I don't believe this is the truth.'"

Not long after, Stone moved to Seattle to pursue his musical career.

== Influences ==
Stone has been influenced by Stevie Wonder, Marvin Gaye, The Meters, Aretha Franklin, Gladys Knight, Jamie Lidell and James Morrison. The New York Times compared his socially conscious music to the likes of Donny Hathaway, Bill Withers and two of his musical influences Stevie Wonder and Marvin Gaye.

== Career ==
Stone has released five albums, Last to Speak (2010, self-released), the self-titled Allen Stone (2011, ATO Records), Radius (2015, Capitol Records), Building Balance (2019, ATO Records), and APART (2021, ATO Records). Radius was also re-released by ATO Records in 2016 as a deluxe edition with seven additional tracks.

Stone had been touring cross-country for a few years and sold a self-released album on the Internet. However, it was not until October 2011, when his second album was released, that his career began to truly kick off. On this album, he was backed by Raphael Saadiq's rhythm section and Miles Davis' keyboardist Deron Johnson. A few songs on Allen Stone were co-written with Andy Grammer. Allen Stone peaked at the number 2 spot on the R&B/Soul charts on iTunes and hit number 9 and number 35 on the Billboard Heatseekers and R&B/Hip Hop Album charts, respectively. USA Today called Allen Stone a "pitch-perfect powerhouse".

In October 2011, he performed his song "Unaware" on Conan and was featured again in June 2015.

In 2012, Stone was featured on the song "Neon Cathedral" by Macklemore and Ryan Lewis off their album The Heist.

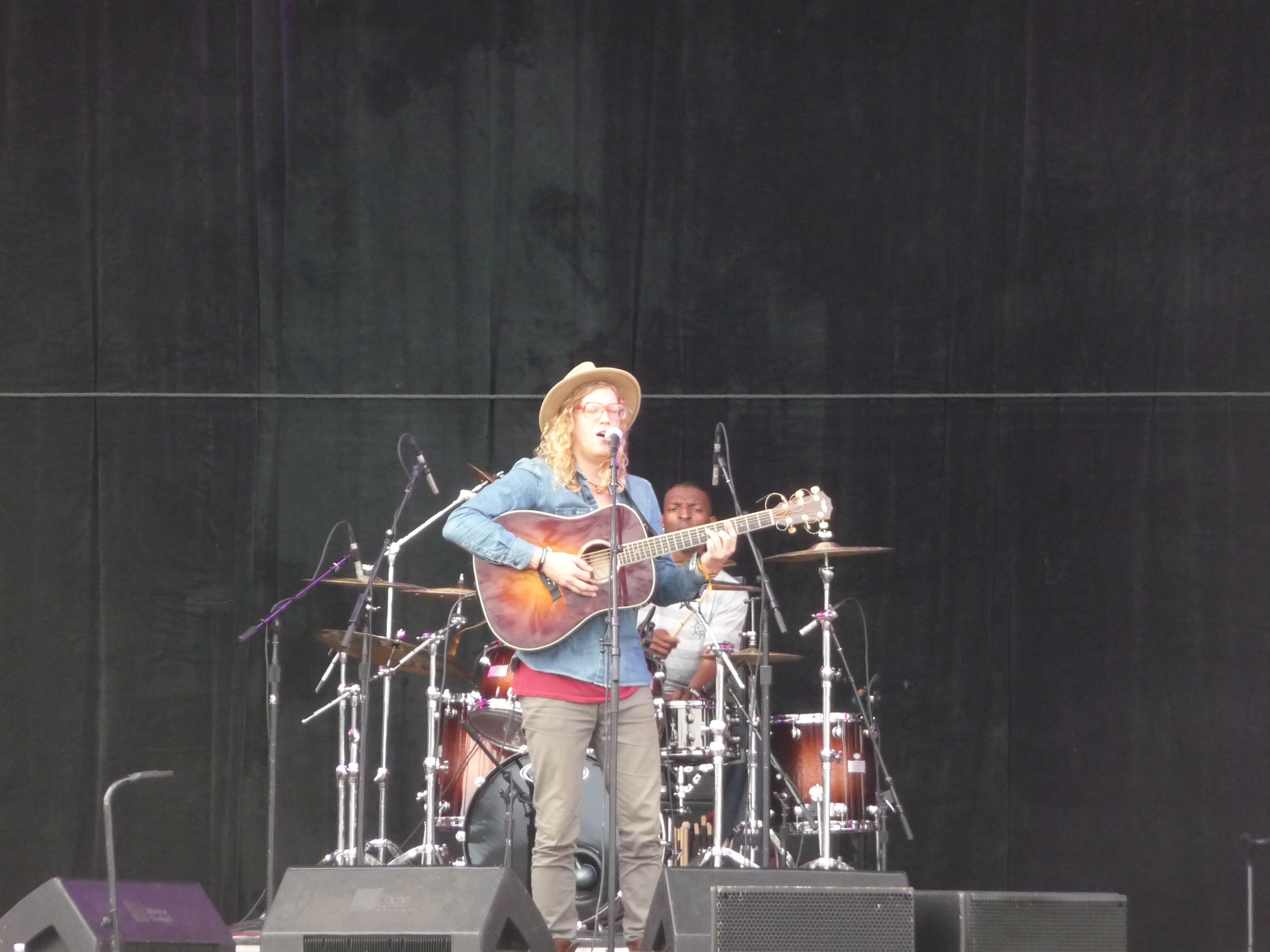
Stone at the Outside Lands Music and Arts Festival 2012

Stone was voted one of mtvU's Freshman 5 in late 2012 and tapped as VH1's first "You Oughta Know" artist of 2013. In January 2013, Stone appeared on The Ellen DeGeneres Show and performed the song "Sleep".

Radius, his first album for Capitol Records, was released on May 2015. It was recorded in collaboration with Magnus Tingsek, and features production from Malay and Benny Cassette. Allen Stone said of the album title, "The radius is that line extending from the center of the circle to its exterior, and in a lot of ways this album is about getting out things deep inside—whether it's love or insecurity or joy or frustration about things going on today." On March 2016, Radius was re-released as a deluxe edition by ATO Records with seven additional tracks.

On April 2017, Stone's song "Perfect World" was featured on the trailer for the upcoming Netflix series Dear White People.

In 2018, Stone released the single "Brown Eyed Lover" and appeared on American Idol in 2018, to sing duets with multiple contestants. His fourth full-length album, 2019's Building Balance, was co-produced with Jamie Lidell.

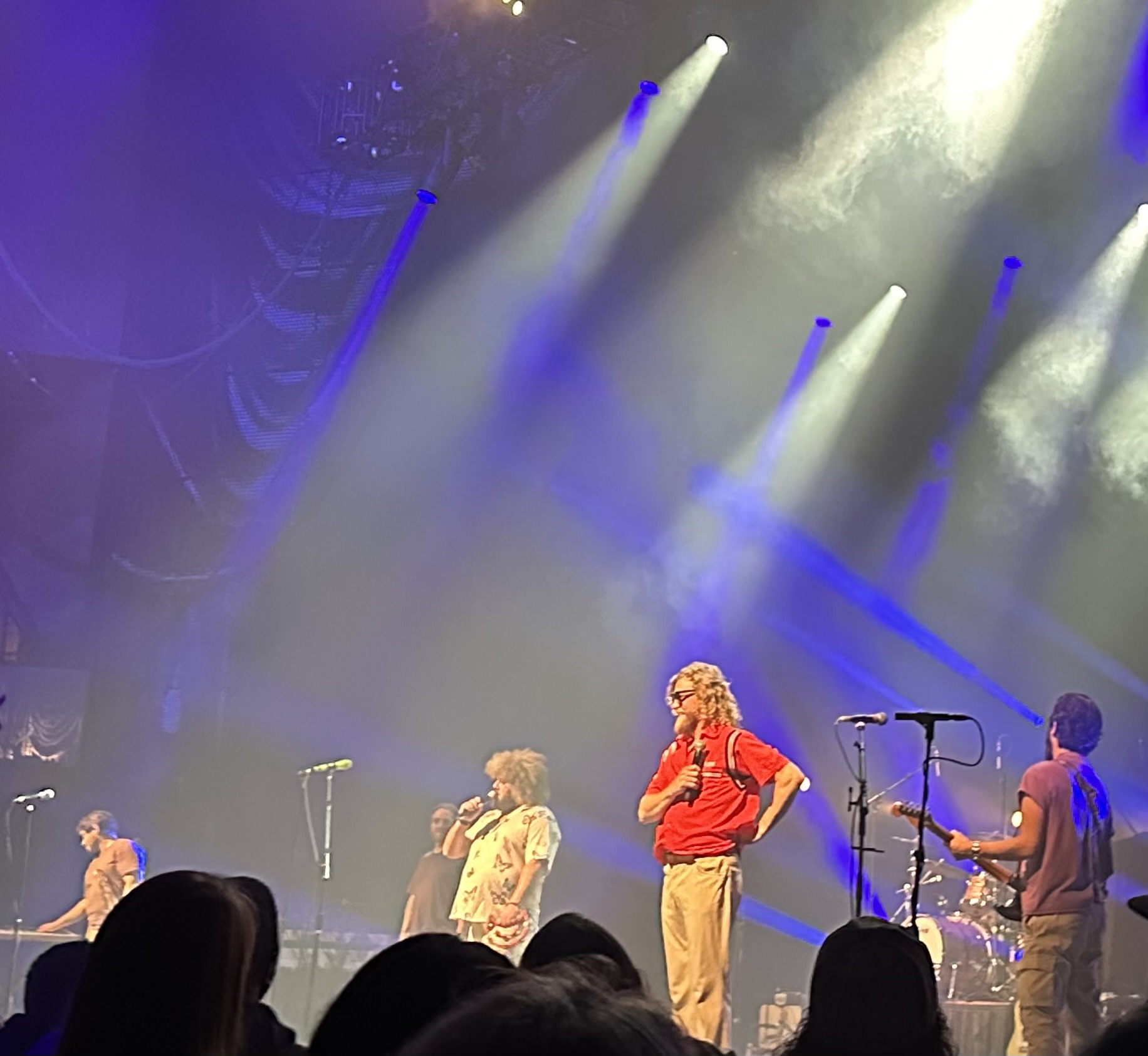
Stone with the band Ripe in concert, November 2025

In 2022, Stone competed in the American Song Contest, representing his home state of Washington. He placed first out of eleven in the jury vote for his semi-final, and advanced to the competition final and finished in fifth place despite not performing live for personal reasons. On October 2022, Stone released a new single, "5 Minutes". He was then to go on tour in Australia, starting on November 11, 2022.

Stone co-wrote and performed on the track "Look At Me" in The Lucky One, an album by Cory Wong released in August 2023.

In 2026, Stone wrote and performed the song "Home, Where Your Heart Found Me" in the Apple TV special Snoopy Presents: There's No Place Like Home, Snoopy.

== Social commentary in music ==
On Allen Stone's self-titled album, a few songs address social and political issues, including "Unaware", "Contact High", and "What I've Seen".

A live music video of "Unaware – Allen Stone – Live From His Mother's Living Room" on Stone's YouTube account has been viewed over 16,000,000 times. Stone wanted to have a different and weird setting for this video, so they recorded it on a set that looked like a living room.

== Discography ==
=== Studio albums ===
Title	Details	Peak chart positions			
Title	Details	US	US Indie	US R&B/ Hip-Hop	NLD
Last to Speak	Released: September 29, 2009; Label: Self-released; Formats: Physical, digital download, streaming	—	—	—	—
Allen Stone	Released: June 26, 2012; Label: ATO; Formats: Physical, digital download, streaming	— (Note: Allen Stone did not enter the Billboard 200 but peaked at No. 4 on the Heatseekers Albums chart.)	50	35	—
Radius	Released: May 26, 2015; Label: Capitol, ATO; Formats: Physical, digital download, streaming	80	—	10	79
Building Balance	Released: November 8, 2019; Label: ATO; Formats: Physical, digital download, streaming	— (Note: Building Balance did not enter the Billboard 200 but peaked at No. 23 on the Top Album Sales chart and No. 18 on the Top Current Album Sales chart.)	— (Note: Building Balance did not enter the Billboard Independent Charts but peaked at No. 7 on the Indie Store Album Sales chart.)	—	—
Apart	Released: November 12, 2021; Label: ATO; Formats: Physical, digital download, streaming	— (Note: Apart did not enter the Billboard 200 but peaked at No. 73 on the Top Current Album Sales chart.)	—	—	—
"—" denotes an album that did not chart or was not released in that territory.

=== Extended plays ===
Title	Details
Spotify Sessions	Released: January 10, 2013; Label: ATO; Formats: Digital download, streaming
Mystery	Released: October 25, 2024; Label: ATO; Formats: Digital download, streaming

=== Singles ===
==== As lead artist ====
Title	Year	Peak chart positions	Album or EP
Title	Year	US Adult	Album or EP
"Million"	2015	—	Non-album single
"Freedom"	2016	33	Radius
"Perfect World"	2016	—	Radius
"Voodoo"	2016	—	Radius (Deluxe Edition)
"The Weekend"	2016	—	Radius (Deluxe Edition)
"Faithful"	2016	—	Radius (Deluxe Edition)
"Alone"	2017	—	Non-album single
"Brown Eyed Lover"	2018	—	Building Balance
"Warriors"	2018	—	Building Balance
"Georgia On My Mind"	2018	—	Non-album single
"Taste of You"	2018	—	Building Balance
"Sunny Days"	2019	—	Building Balance
"More to Learn" (with Swatkins featuring Eric Krasno)	2022	—	Friends and Other Necessities
"A Bit of Both"	2022	—	American Song Contest: Episode 4
"5 Minutes"	2022	—	Non-album singles
"Magic"	2023	—	Non-album singles
"Many Rivers to Cross" (with EJ Worland)	2023	—	Tunnels
"A Fathers Song"	2024	—	Non-album single
"Can't Explain This Love"	2024	—	Mystery
"Mystery" (featuring PJ Morton)	2024	—	Mystery
"Memory of You"	2024	—	Mystery
"Closer"	2025	—	Non-album singles
"Ride Like the Wind"	2025	—	Non-album singles
"—" denotes a recording that did not chart or was not released in that territory.

==== As featured artist ====
Title	Year	Album or EP
"Neon Cathedral" (Macklemore & Ryan Lewis featuring Allen Stone)	2012	The Heist
"Maggie & Al" (Tingsek featuring Allen Stone)	2016	Amygdala
"Turnt Up" (Deva Mahal featuring Allen Stone)	2018	Run Deep
"Don't Cry" (The Bgp featuring Allen Stone)	2018	HurtMeKissMe
"Weekend" (Haley Johnsen featuring Allen Stone)	2019	Non-album singles
"Sad Songs" (Eric Hutchinson featuring Allen Stone, Clyde Lawrence, and Huntertones)	2023	Non-album singles
"Nola II" (Kota the Friend featuring Allen Stone and Tarriona "Tank" Ball)	2023	Protea
"Look at Me" (Cory Wong featuring Allen Stone)	2023	The Lucky One
"Champagne People" (Benny Sings featuring Allen Stone)	2023	Champagne People (20th Anniversary Edition)
"Natural High" (Quinn XCII featuring Allen Stone)	2024	Breakfast
"Sweet Iced Tea" (Stephen Day featuring Allen Stone)	2025	Non-album singles

=== Other charted songs ===
Title	Year	Peak chart positions		Album or EP
Title	Year	US Adult Alt.	US R&B/ Hip-Hop Sales	Album or EP
"Sleep"	2012	18	—	Allen Stone
"Unaware"	2018	—	24	Apart
"Is This Love"	2021	—	19	Apart
"—" denotes a recording that did not chart or was not released in that territory.

=== Other appearances ===
Title	Year	Album or EP
"Rocky Mountain High"	2013	The Music Is You: A Tribute to John Denver
