= Allen Stone (album) =

Studio album by Allen Stone
- Released: October 4, 2011
- Studio: Robert Lang (Shoreline, Washington)
- Length: 38:22
- Label: ATO

Allen Stone chronology
| Last to Speak (2010) | Allen Stone (2011) | Radius (2015) |

Allen Stone is the debut album by singer Allen Stone, first released on October 4, 2011. It was re-released nationally by ATO Records in 2012.

== Commercial performance ==
The album debuted on the Billboard Top R&B/Hip-Hop Albums chart at No. 62 on its initial release in October 2011, and No. 29 on the Heatseekers Albums, selling 1,000 copies in the US. It peaked at No. 35 on Top R&B/Hip-Hop Albums in its third week of release, and No. 4 on the Heatseekers Albums in January 2013. The album has sold 66,000 copies in the US as of May 2015.

== Track listing ==
1. "Sleep" – 2:26
2. "Celebrate Tonight" – 3:23
3. "What I've Seen" – 2:41
4. "Say So" – 3:33
5. "The Wind" – 5:06
6. "Satisfaction" – 4:54
7. "Contact High" – 3:06
8. "Nothing to Prove" – 3:22
9. "Your Eyes" – 4:05
10. "Unaware" – 5:49
11. "Figure It Out - Live in the Studio" – 4:08 (Spotify bonus track)

== Charts ==
| Chart (2011–2013) | Peak position |
|---|---|
| US Top R&B/Hip-Hop Albums (Billboard) | 35 |
| US Heatseekers Albums (Billboard) | 4 |
