= Meleana =

Meleana is a feminine given name. Notable people with the name include:

- Meleana (musician) (born 1988), American Christian musician
- Meleana Shim (born 1991), American soccer player

== See also ==
- Melania, given name
- Meleane, given name
- Meleán, family name
- Melena, type of feces
