= The Voice (American TV series) season 29 =

The Voice: Battle of Champions
- Season 29
- Promotional poster featuring coaches Legend, Clarkson, and Levine
- Hosted by: Carson Daly; Druski (commentator)
- Coaches: John Legend; Kelly Clarkson; Adam Levine; Jennifer Hudson (guest); CeeLo Green (guest)
- No. of contestants: 30
- Winner: Alexia Jayy
- Winning coach: Adam Levine
- Runner-up: Liv Ciara
- No. of episodes: 10

Release
- Original network: NBC
- Original release: February 23 – April 14, 2026

Season chronology
- ← Previous; Season 28 Next → Season 30

The twenty-ninth season of the American reality television series The Voice (subtitled as The Voice: Battle of Champions) premiered on February 23, 2026, on NBC. This season features a panel, for the first time, of three coaches, all having previously been a winning coach. The season is hosted by Carson Daly, who has hosted every season of the show. The coaching panel consists of John Legend, who returns for his eleventh season after a one-season hiatus; Kelly Clarkson, who returns for her tenth season after last coaching in the twenty-third season; and Adam Levine, who returns for his eighteenth season, also after a one-season hiatus.

Alexia Jayy was named the winner of the season by the studio audience composed of super-fans and past Voice artists, marking Adam Levine's fourth win as a coach. With Jayy's win, she became the first African-American female to win in the show's history. Additionally, Jayy's win marks Levine's first win as a coach since the ninth season and ties him with Clarkson for the second-most winning coach on The Voice, behind Blake Shelton.

This was the first season in the show's history without a live episode at any point, and only the final episode aired on a Tuesday. This continued the schedule changes from season 28, all resulting from the NBA on NBC package taking over Tuesday nights when episodes had aired in the past.

== Overview ==
=== Coaches and host ===
Coaches and Host of The Voice Season 29

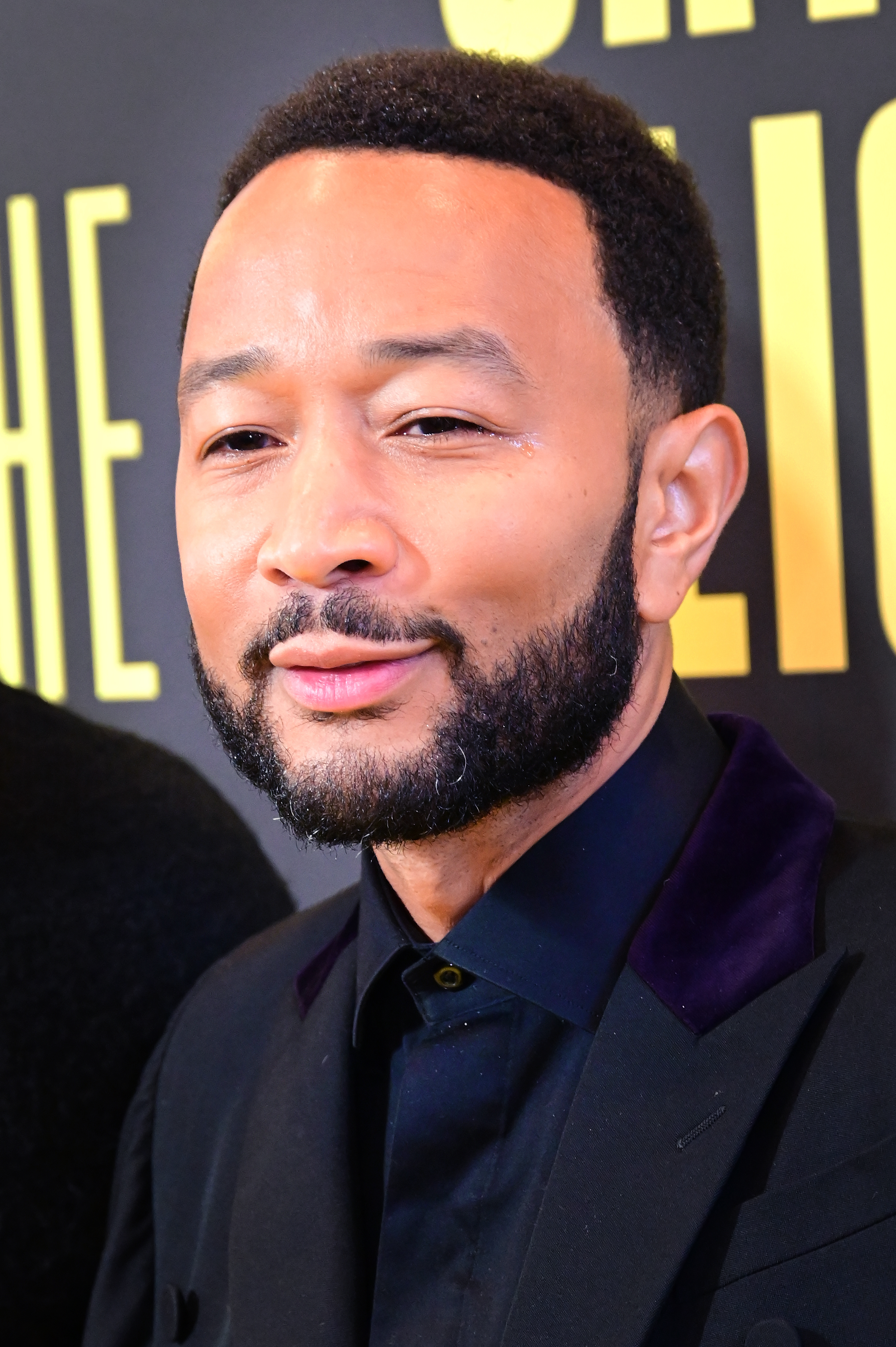
John Legend

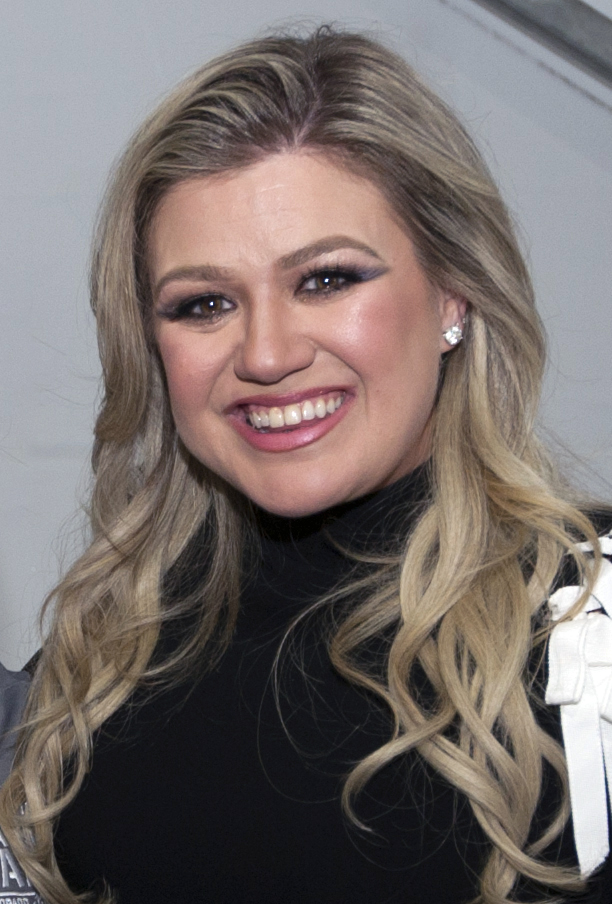
Kelly Clarkson

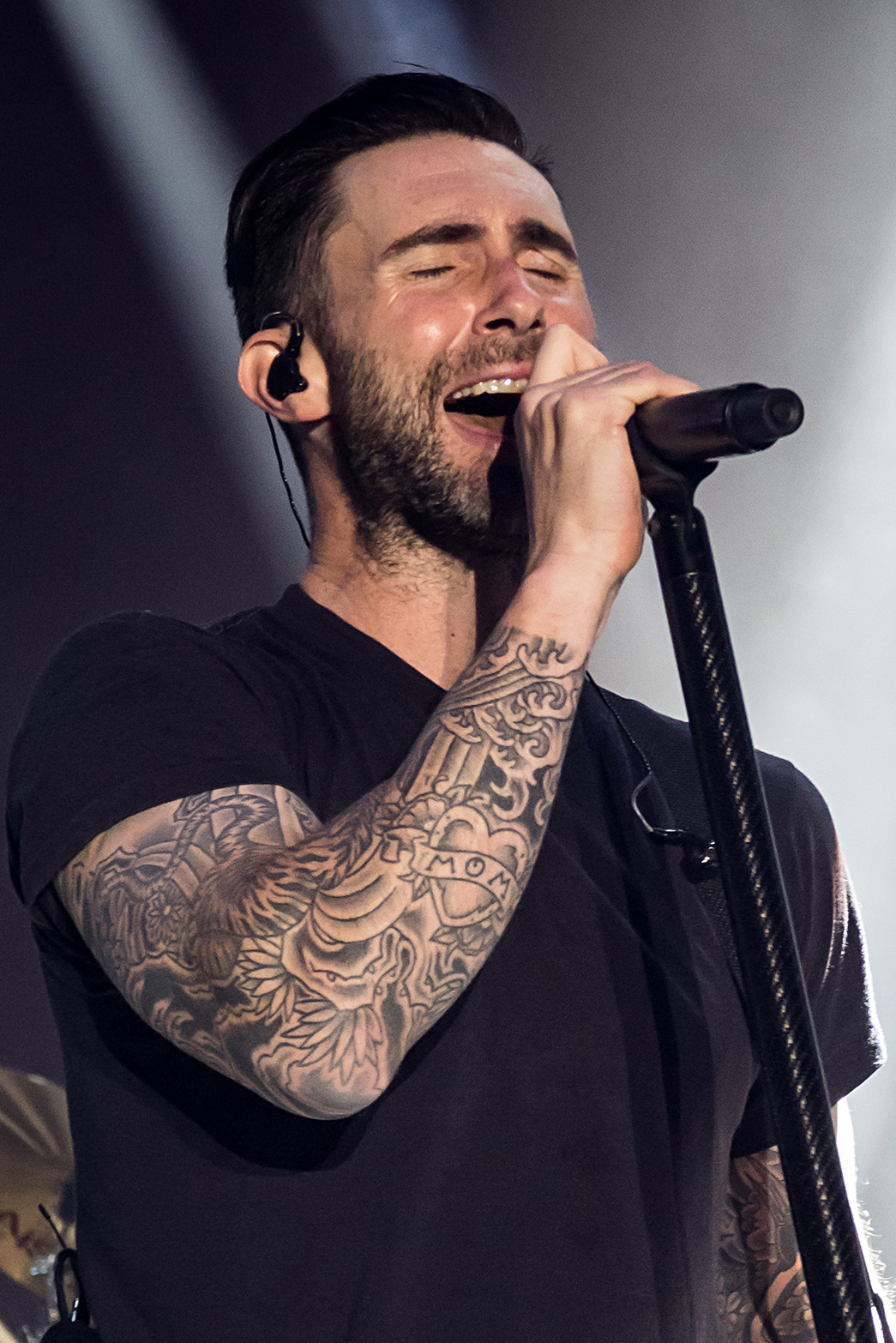
Adam Levine

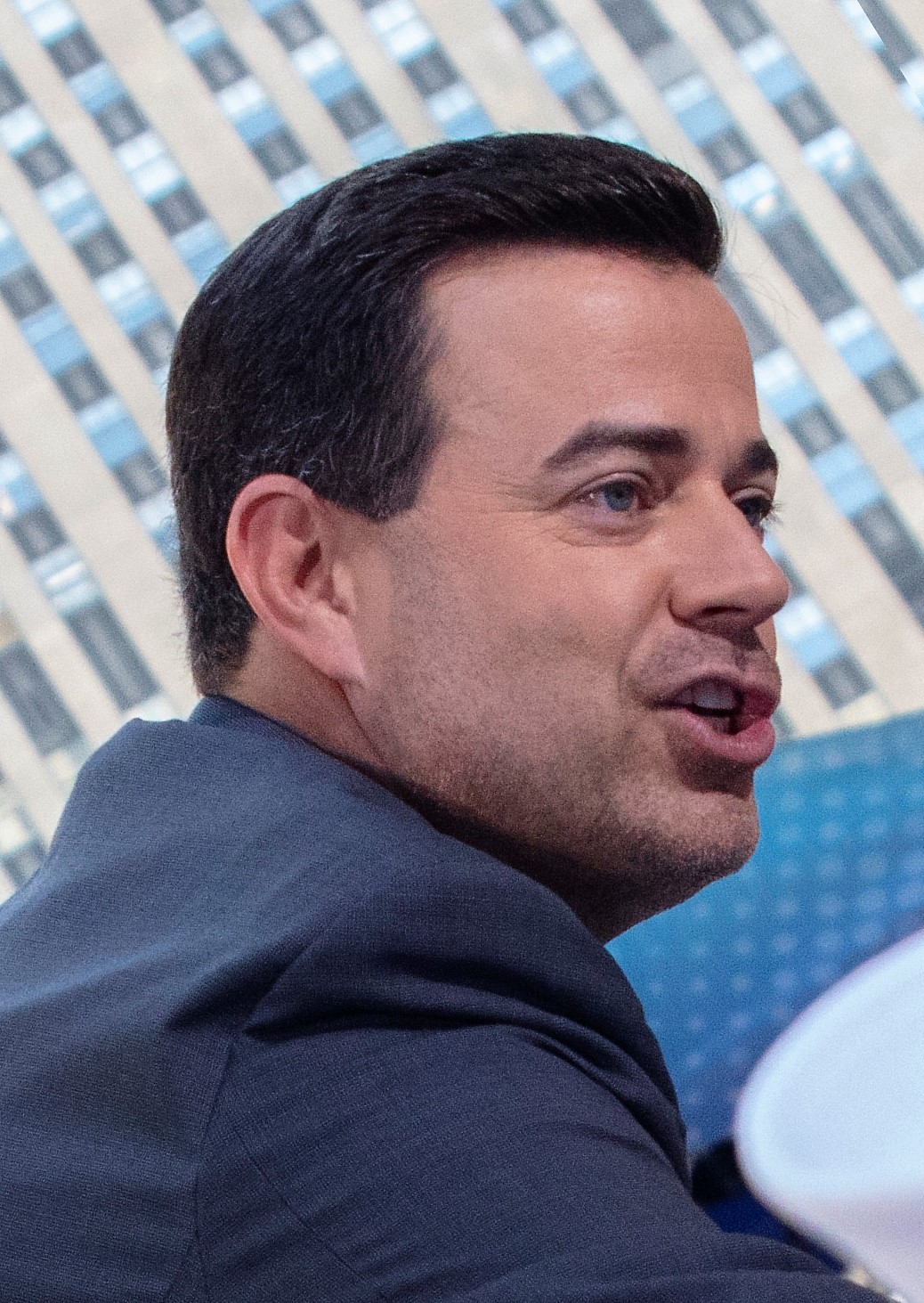
Carson Daly (host)

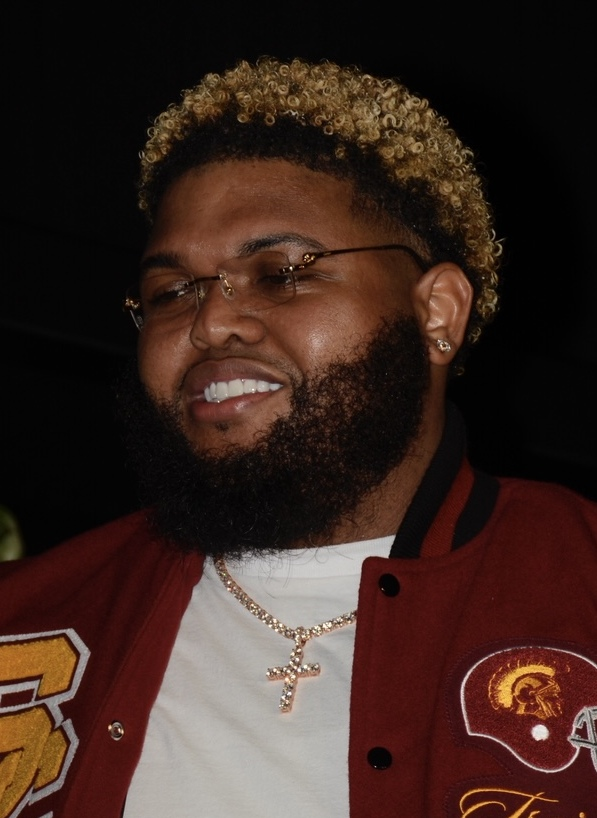
Druski (commentator)

On July 22, 2025, during the filming of the blind auditions, it was announced that the twenty-ninth season would feature only three coaches for the first time in the show's history. Branded as the "Battle of Champions", all coaches are previous winning coaches. Season 16 winning coach John Legend returned for his eleventh season after a one-season hiatus, four-time winning coach Kelly Clarkson returned for her tenth season after last coaching in the twenty-third season, and three-time winning coach Adam Levine returned for his eighteenth season also after a one-season hiatus. The lineup of coaches was revealed on the show's website. Following the departures of Michael Bublé, Reba McEntire, Niall Horan, and Snoop Dogg, it marks the first time in the show's history that none of the coaches from the previous season returned.

Carson Daly returns for his twenty-ninth consecutive season as host. Druski joined The Voice as the show's first ever commentator.

=== Battle and knockout advisors ===
The teams' battle advisors and knockouts mega mentors were revealed simultaneously on March 9, 2026, shortly prior to the end of the blind auditions. The battle advisors for this season are Muni Long for Team Legend, former coach Jennifer Hudson for Team Kelly, and Benji Madden for Team Adam. Hudson served as a guest coach to Team Kelly due to Clarkson missing rehearsals following the death of her ex-husband, Brandon Blackstock, to melanoma. The knockouts mega mentors are former coach and In-Season All Star Competition judge CeeLo Green, who mentored Teams Adam and Legend, and previous season's coach Michael Bublé, who was paired with Team Kelly.

=== Marketing and promotion ===
Shortly prior to the season premiere, the blind auditions of Alexia Jayy, performing Carole King's "(You Make Me Feel Like) A Natural Woman"; and Lucas West, performing Elton John's "Bennie and the Jets", were released online. Later episodes saw the auditions of Mike Steele, JW Griffin, Hunter Jordan, Houston Kelly, and Syd Millevoi released online as a sneak peek for their respective episode.

== Teams ==
Teams color key
Winner	Eliminated in the Semifinals
Runner-up	Eliminated in the Knockouts
Third place	Stolen in the Battles
Fourth place	Eliminated in the Battles

Coaches' teams
Coach	Top 30 Artists			
John Legend				
John Legend	Lucas West	Syd Millevoi	KJ Willis	Natasha Blaine
John Legend	Moses G.	Grace Humphries	~~Mike Steele~~	Adi Arora
John Legend	Ashley Marina	Kendra Remedios	AJ Robinson	
Kelly Clarkson				
Kelly Clarkson	Liv Ciara	Mikenley Brown	JW Griffin	Houston Kelly
Kelly Clarkson	Jonah Mayor	Abigayle Oakley	Tia DuRant	Blaire Elbert
Kelly Clarkson	Julia Golden	Aaron LaVigne		
Adam Levine				
Adam Levine	Alexia Jayy	Jeremy Keith	Jared Shoemaker	Jaali Boyd
Adam Levine	Bay Simpson	Mike Steele	~~Moses G.~~	Bijou Belle
Adam Levine	Aziz Guerra	Hunter Jordan	Drew Russell	
Note: Italicized names are artists stolen from another team during the battles (names struck through within former teams). The bold name is the recipient of the "Super Steal".

== Blind auditions ==
The show began with the Blind Auditions on February 23, 2026. In each audition, an artist sings their piece in front of the coaches, whose chairs face the audience. If a coach is interested in working with the artist, they may press their button to face the artist. If only one coach presses the button, the artist automatically becomes part of their team. If multiple coaches turn, they will compete for the artist, who will decide which team they will join. For the first time since the feature was introduced, the "block" buttons were removed this season. This season, each coach ended up with 10 artists by the end of the blind auditions, creating a total of 30 artists advancing to the battles.

Blind auditions color key
✔	Coach hit his/her "I WANT YOU" button
	Artist defaulted to this coach's team
	Artist selected to join this coach's team
	Artist received a 'Triple Turn'
	Artist was eliminated with no coach pressing their button

=== Episode 1 (February 23) ===
Among this episode's auditionees was Liv Ciara, who previously auditioned unsuccessfully in season 28.

First blind auditions results
Order	Artist	Age	Hometown	Song	Coach's and artist's choices		
Order	Artist	Age	Hometown	Song	John	Kelly	Adam
1	Lucas West	20	Fairport, New York	"Bennie and the Jets"	✔	–	✔
2	Alexia Jayy	31	Mobile, Alabama	"(You Make Me Feel Like) A Natural Woman"	✔	✔	✔
3	Julia Golden	19	Carthage, North Carolina	"Strawberry Wine"	✔	✔	–
4	Abigayle Oakley	25	Las Vegas, Nevada	"Call Your Girlfriend"	✔	✔	✔
5	Landon Price	17	Jackson, Mississippi	"Glory"	–	–	–
6	Jonah Mayor	31	Bronx, New York	"Il Mondo"	–	✔	✔
7	Bay Simpson	26	Muscle Shoals, Alabama	"The Waiting"	–	–	✔
8	Liv Ciara	16	St. Peters, Missouri	"We Can't Be Friends (Wait for Your Love)"	–	✔	✔
9	Aaron LaVigne	43	Cincinnati, Ohio	"Feels Like the First Time"	✔	✔	–
10	AJ Robinson	14	Cataula, Georgia	"Watermelon Moonshine"	✔	–	–
11	Jeremy Keith	40	Washington, D.C.	"You Are My Lady"	✔	✔	✔

=== Episode 2 (March 2) ===
Second blind auditions results
Order	Artist	Age	Hometown	Song	Coach's and artist's choices		
Order	Artist	Age	Hometown	Song	John	Kelly	Adam
1	JW Griffin	25	Moultrie, Georgia	"Long Haired Country Boy"	✔	✔	✔
2	Nicolette Capua	23	Staten Island, New York	"You Broke Me First"	–	–	–
3	Tia DuRant	32	Sumter, South Carolina	"Midnight Train to Georgia"	–	✔	✔
4	Kendra Remedios	31	Arlington, Texas	"Girl Crush"	✔	–	–
5	Mike Steele	28	Tutwiler, Mississippi	"For Tonight"	✔	✔	✔
6	Bijou Belle	17	Rapid City, South Dakota	"Wildflower"	–	–	✔
7	Jaali Boyd	25	Baltimore, Maryland	"No Air"	–	✔	✔
8	Blaire Elbert	28	Lubbock, Texas	"Wide Rollin' Plains"	–	✔	–
9	Adi Arora	21	Short Hills, New Jersey	"It Will Rain"	✔	✔	–
10	Moses G.	31	Harlem, New York	"Forever Young"	–	–	✔
11	Chezzarai	31	Los Angeles, California	"I'm Every Woman"	–	–	–
12	Hunter Jordan	22	Maysville, Kentucky	"Let Me Down Easy"	✔	✔	✔

=== Episode 3 (March 9) ===
Among this episode's auditionees was Ashley Marina, who previously competed on the fifteenth season of America's Got Talent; Jason Farol, who previously competed on Duets; and Mikenley Brown, who previously competed on the twenty-first season of American Idol.

Third blind auditions results
Order	Artist	Age	Hometown	Song	Coach's and artist's choices		
Order	Artist	Age	Hometown	Song	John	Kelly	Adam
1	KJ Willis	35	Memphis, Tennessee	"Roni"	✔	✔	–
2	Houston Kelly	20	Memphis, Tennessee	"Walking in Memphis"	–	✔	–
3	Ashley Marina	18	Pittsburgh, Pennsylvania	"Tonight I Wanna Cry"	✔	✔	✔
4	Aziz Guerra	20	Guadalajara, Mexico / El Paso, Texas	"El Triste"	–	–	✔
5	Mariette Gevorgian	15	Burbank, California	"Anyone"	–	–	–
6	Jason Farol	36	Redondo Beach, California	"Saturn"	–	–	–
7	Mikenley Brown	19	New Castle, Indiana	"Teenage Dream"	✔	✔	✔
8	Grace Humphries	18	Austin, Texas	"Both Sides, Now"	✔	Team full	–
9	Natasha Blaine	27	Seattle, Washington	"Kiss of Life"	✔	Team full	–
10	Drew Russell	32	Los Angeles, California	"Blue Bayou"	–	Team full	✔
11	Syd Millevoi	23	Secaucus, New Jersey	"Mamma Knows Best"	✔	Team full	✔
12	Daniel Sovich	28	Aurora, Ohio	"Just the Way You Are"	Team full	Team full	–
13	Jared Shoemaker	32	Richmond, Kentucky	"I Never Lie"	Team full	Team full	✔

=== Triple Turn Competition ===
This season, the coach that gained the most three-chair-turn artists on their team received an advantage in the battles: the "Super Steal," allowing the coach to override other steals in the round to acquire the artist. Kelly Clarkson and Adam Levine tied for the most triple-turns at 3–3; thus, the number of two-chairs each coach acquired was the deciding factor, with Kelly winning by a score of 5–1.

Coach	Artist(s)	Total (Note: As both Clarkson and Levine were tied, the number of two-chairs each coach acquired was the deciding factor.)
John Legend	Ashley Marina, Mike Steele	2
Kelly Clarkson	Mikenley Brown, JW Griffin, Abigayle Oakley	3
Adam Levine	Alexia Jayy, Hunter Jordan, Jeremy Keith	3

== Battles ==
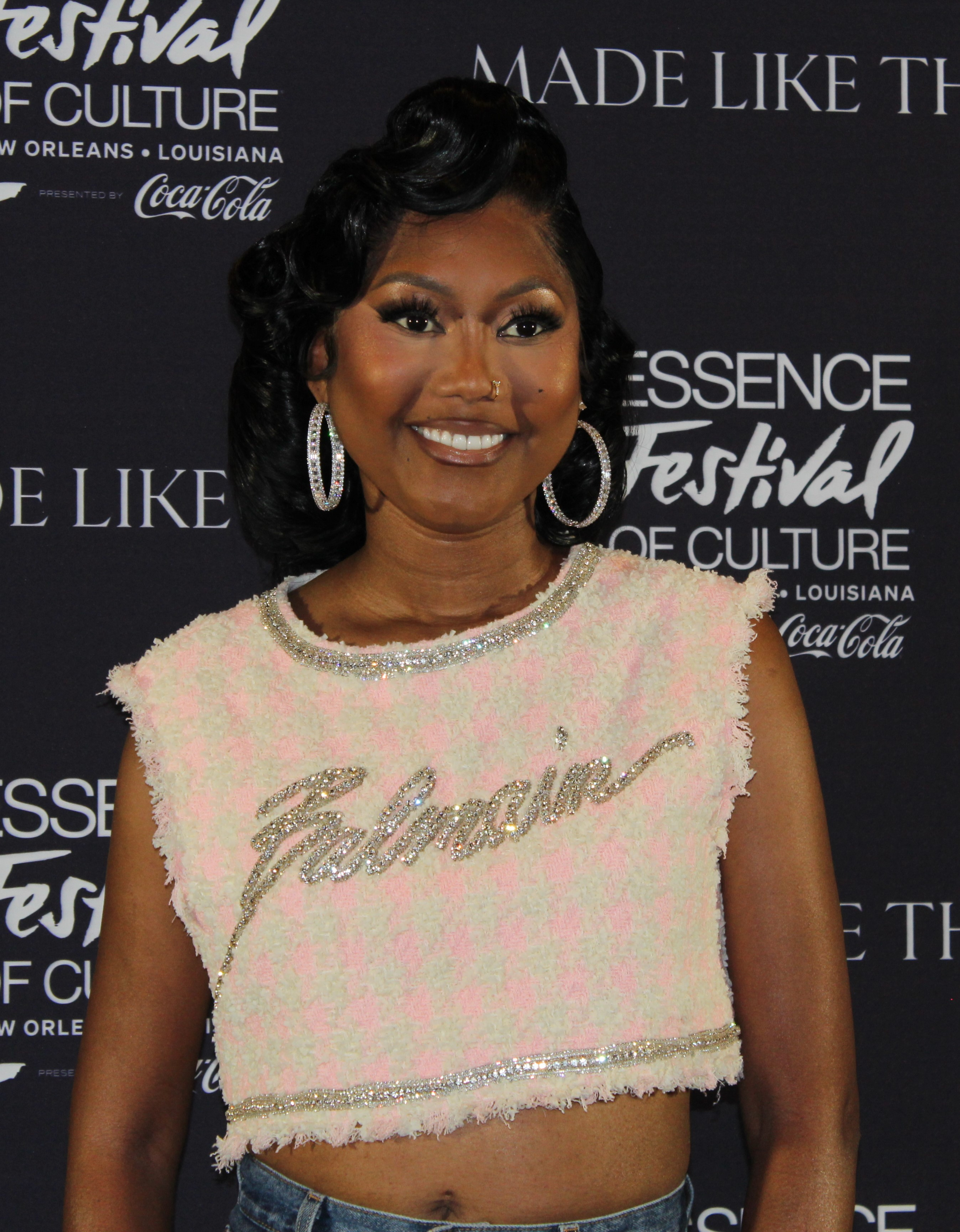
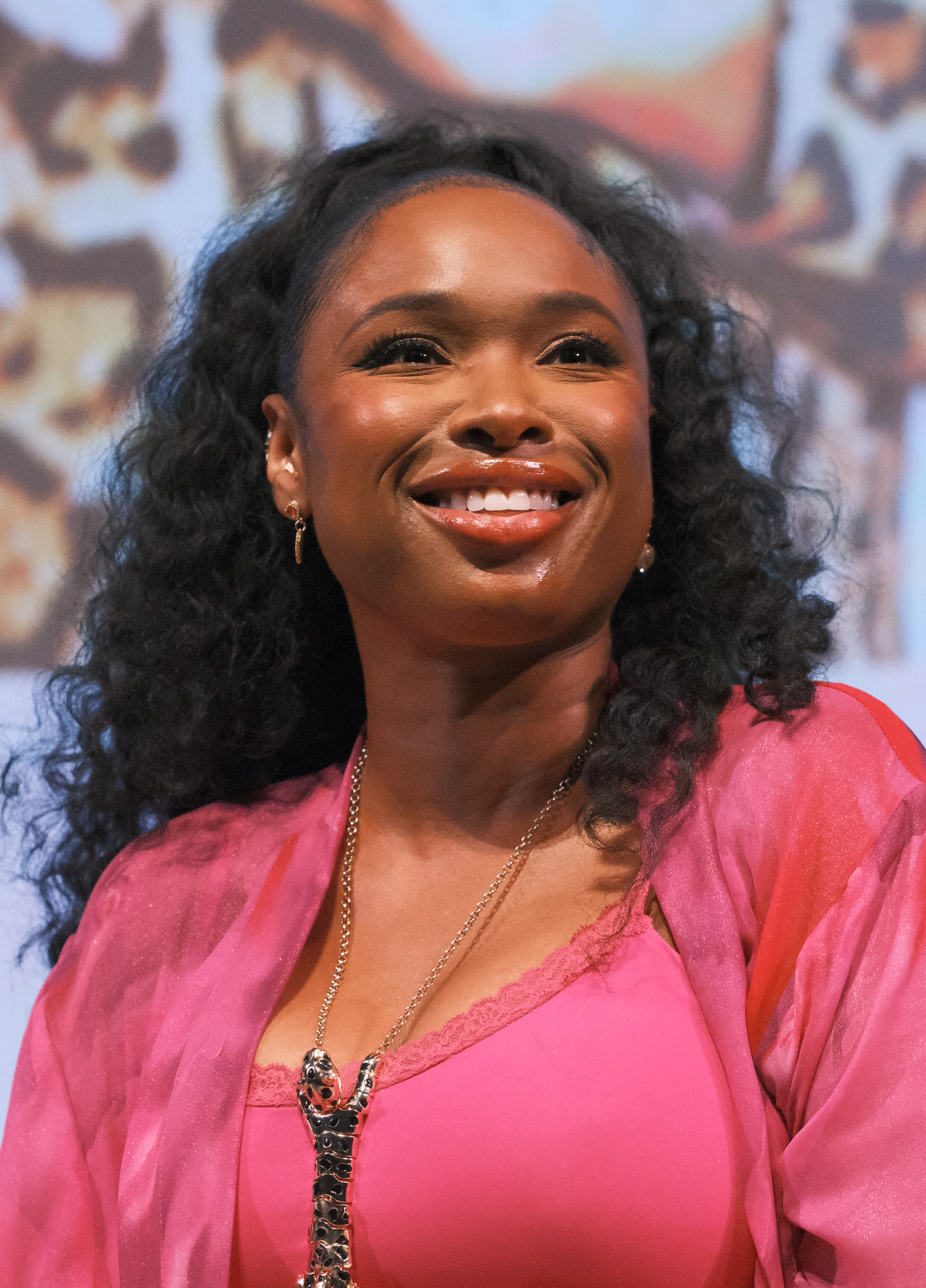
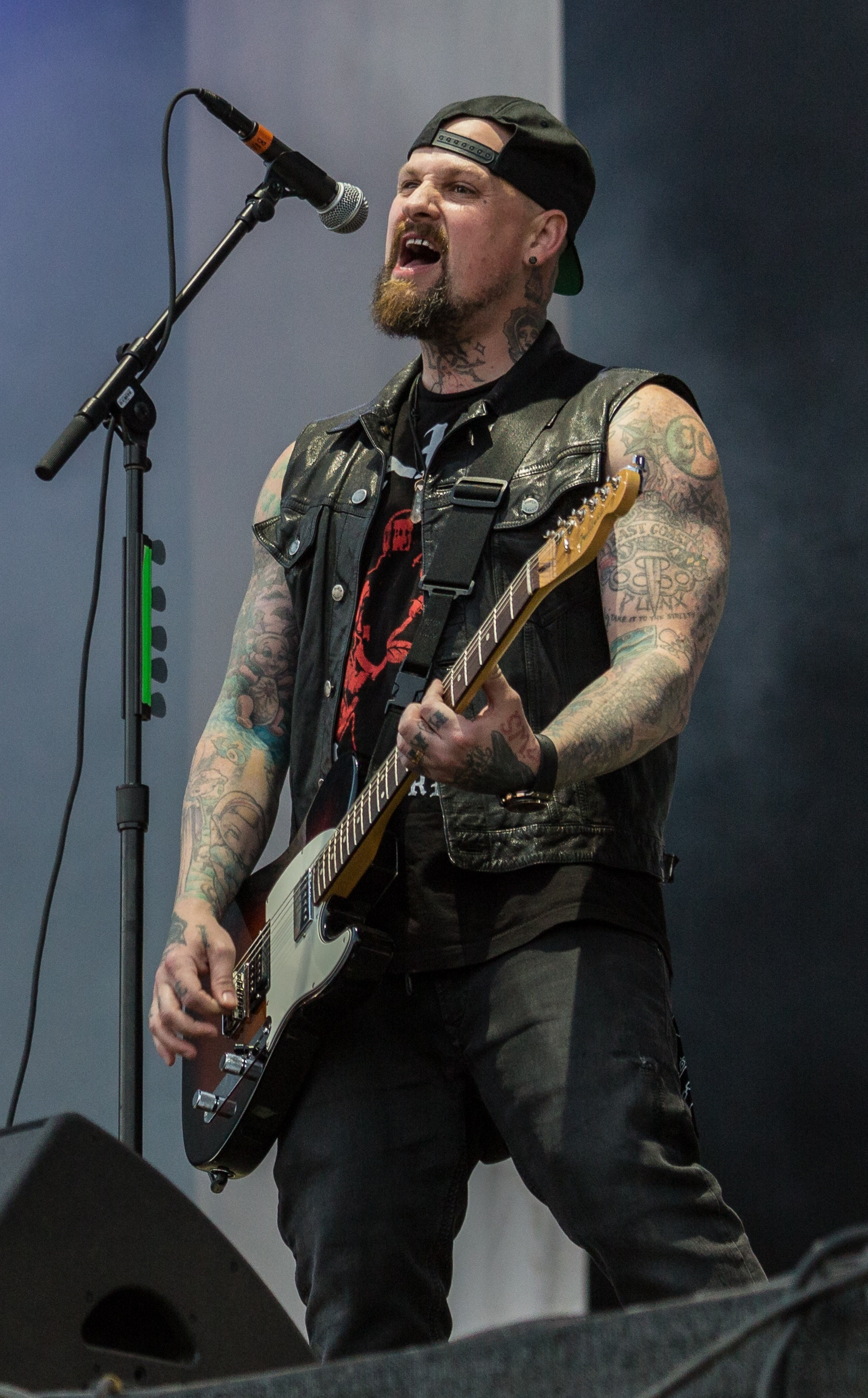
Muni Long served as an advisor for Team Legend, Jennifer Hudson for Team Kelly, and Benji Madden for Team Adam.

The second stage of the show, the battles, aired from March 16, 2026, to March 23, 2026, consisting of episodes 4 and 5. The advisors for this round were Muni Long for Team Legend, Jennifer Hudson for Team Kelly, and Benji Madden for Team Adam. Hudson served as a guest coach to Clarkson's team during rehearsals due to Clarkson's absence following the death of her ex-husband, Brandon Blackstock, due to melanoma.

In this round, artists were paired in a singing match and then their coach selected one of them to advance to the next round. Losing artists may be "stolen" by another coach, becoming new members of their team. Multiple coaches can attempt to steal an artist, resulting in a competition for the artist, who will ultimately decide which team they will go to. However, Kelly had the "Super Steal" after winning the Triple Turn Competition, allowing her to override other steals or save her own artist in this round to acquire the artist. This season, there were no saves, which marked the first time since the twenty-fourth season that no saves were in the Battles.

Battles color key
Artist won the Battle and advanced to the Knockouts
Artist lost the Battle, but advanced to the Knockouts after being stolen by another coach
Artist lost the Battle, but advanced to the Knockouts after being stolen/saved by Kelly Clarkson using the "Super Steal"
Artist lost the Battle and was eliminated

Battles results
Episode	Coach	Order	Winner	Song	Loser	'Steal' result		
Episode	Coach	Order	Winner	Song	Loser	John	Kelly	Adam
Episode 4 (Monday, March 16, 2026)	Kelly	1	Mikenley Brown	"Focus"	Liv Ciara	✔	✔	✔
Episode 4 (Monday, March 16, 2026)	Adam	2	Bay Simpson	"I'm the Problem"	Hunter Jordan	–	Team full	N/A
Episode 4 (Monday, March 16, 2026)	John	3	Lucas West	"Wanted"	AJ Robinson	N/A	Team full	–
Episode 4 (Monday, March 16, 2026)	Adam	4	Jaali Boyd	"Die for You"	Bijou Belle	–	Team full	N/A
Episode 4 (Monday, March 16, 2026)	Kelly	5	JW Griffin	"Never Again, Again"	Blaire Elbert	–	Team full	–
Episode 4 (Monday, March 16, 2026)	John	6	Grace Humphries	"Just Give Me a Reason"	Adi Arora	N/A	Team full	–
Episode 4 (Monday, March 16, 2026)	Adam	7	Alexia Jayy	"Nightshift"	Moses G.	✔	Team full	N/A
Episode 5 (Monday, March 23, 2026)	Adam	1	Jared Shoemaker	"Leather and Lace"	Drew Russell	Team full	Team full	N/A
Episode 5 (Monday, March 23, 2026)	Kelly	2	Houston Kelly	"Either Way"	Tia DuRant	Team full	Team full	–
Episode 5 (Monday, March 23, 2026)	Adam	3	Jeremy Keith	"My Cherie Amour"	Aziz Guerra	Team full	Team full	N/A
Episode 5 (Monday, March 23, 2026)	John	4	Natasha Blaine	"Walk On By"	Kendra Remedios	Team full	Team full	–
Episode 5 (Monday, March 23, 2026)	Kelly	5	Jonah Mayor	"The First Time"	Aaron LaVigne	Team full	Team full	–
Episode 5 (Monday, March 23, 2026)	John	6	Syd Millevoi	"Love Takes Time"	Ashley Marina	Team full	Team full	–
Episode 5 (Monday, March 23, 2026)	Kelly	7	Abigayle Oakley	"Rhiannon"	Julia Golden	Team full	Team full	–
Episode 5 (Monday, March 23, 2026)	John	8	KJ Willis	"Let Me Love You"	Mike Steele	Team full	Team full	✔

== Knockouts ==
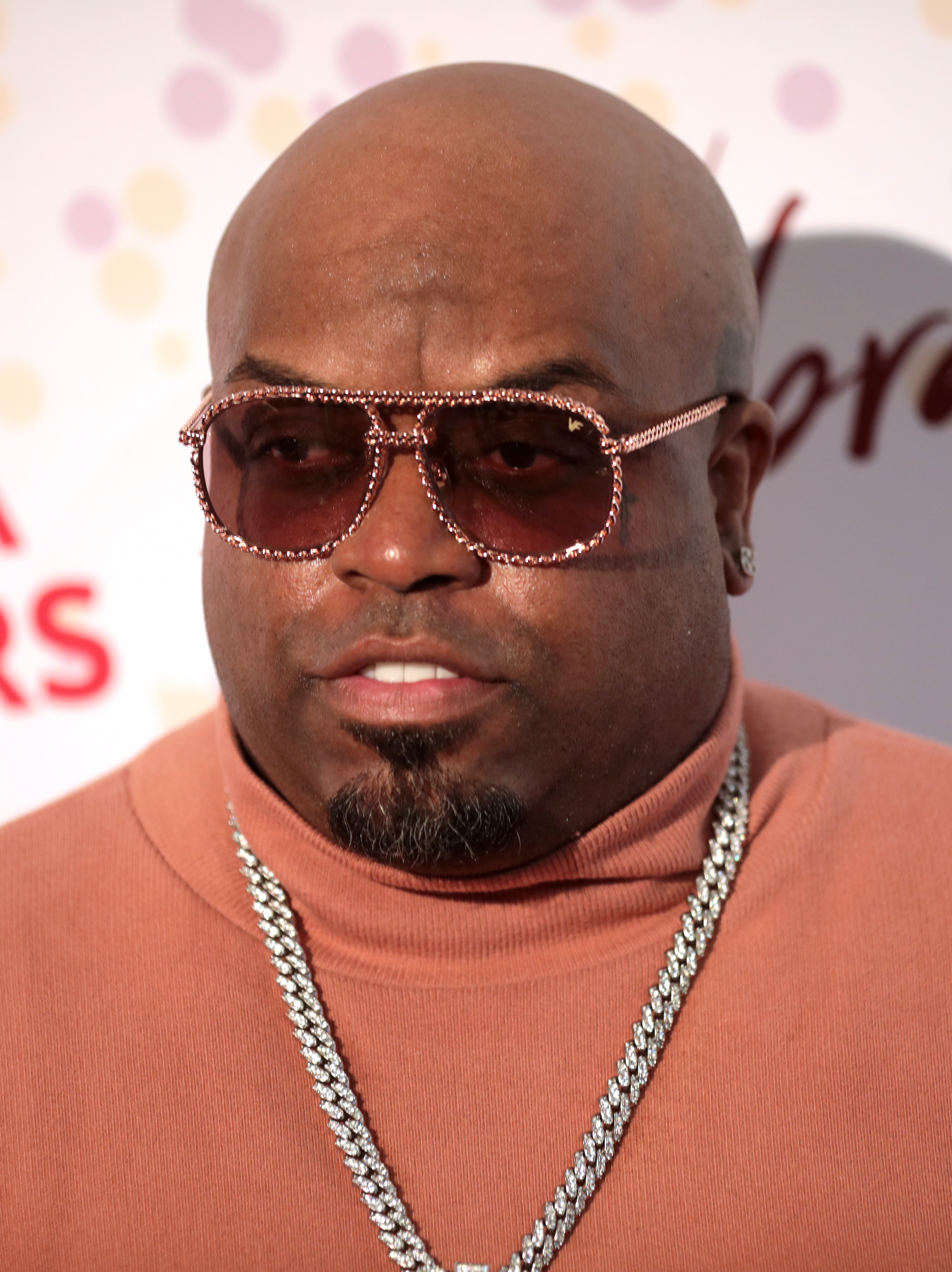
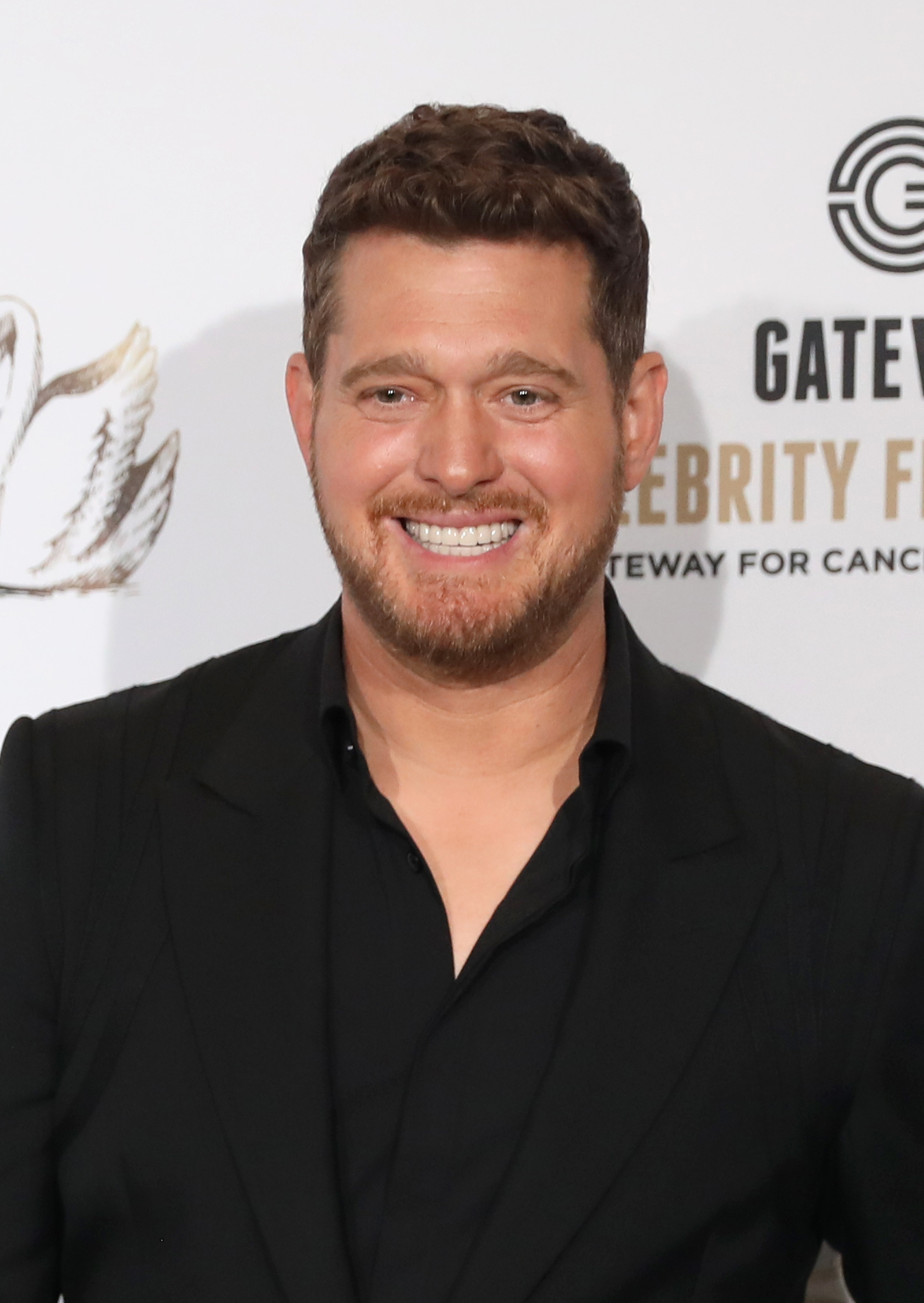
CeeLo Green served as mega mentor for Teams Adam and Legend, and Michael Bublé served as mega mentor for Team Kelly.

The third stage of the show, the knockouts, aired from March 30, 2026, to April 6, 2026, consisting of episodes 6 and 7. Former coach CeeLo Green served as mega mentor for Teams Adam and Legend, while two-time winning coach Michael Bublé served as mega mentor for Team Kelly. In the round, each coach grouped two of their artists in a singing match. The artists themselves selected the song they sang in the round, and then their coach selected one of them to advance to the semifinals. This season, there were neither saves nor steals.

Knockouts color key
Artist won the knockout and advanced to the semifinals
Artist lost the knockout and was eliminated

Knockouts results
Episode	Coach	Order	Winner		Loser	
Episode	Coach	Order	Song	Artist	Artist	Song
Episode 6 (Monday, March 30, 2026)	John	1	"New York State of Mind"	Lucas West	Moses G.	"Let's Get It On"
Episode 6 (Monday, March 30, 2026)	Kelly	2	"If It Hadn't Been for Love"	JW Griffin	Houston Kelly	"Love You Anyway"
Episode 6 (Monday, March 30, 2026)	Adam	3	"You Give Good Love"	Alexia Jayy	Bay Simpson	"One Headlight"
Episode 6 (Monday, March 30, 2026)	Kelly	4	"Breakaway"	Liv Ciara	Abigayle Oakley	"Feather"
Episode 6 (Monday, March 30, 2026)	John	5	"Tell Me You Love Me"	Syd Millevoi	Natasha Blaine	"Another Sad Love Song"
Episode 6 (Monday, March 30, 2026)	Adam	6	"Ain't Nothing Like the Real Thing"	Jeremy Keith	Mike Steele	"How You Gonna Act Like That"
Episode 7 (Monday, April 6, 2026)	Adam	1	"Modern Day Bonnie and Clyde"	Jared Shoemaker	Jaali Boyd	"Big Girls Don't Cry"
Episode 7 (Monday, April 6, 2026)	John	2	"I'll Make Love to You"	KJ Willis	Grace Humphries	"I Don't Want to Wait"
Episode 7 (Monday, April 6, 2026)	Kelly	3	"Pink Pony Club"	Mikenley Brown	Jonah Mayor	"You'll Be in My Heart"

=== In-Season All-Star Competition ===
Also in the knockouts round, for the first time in the show's history, two contestants from each coach's former teams competed in a separate round dubbed the "In-Season All-Star Competition", for a total of six former artists. Each artist was paired with an artist from an opposing past team. CeeLo Green decided which artist from the pair wins the matchup. The coach that receives the most All-Star wins in the round was guaranteed a second artist in the finale.

The All-Star artists are season 16 winner Maelyn Jarmon and season 27 third-place finisher Renzo for Team Legend, season 17 winner Jake Hoot and season 21 winner Girl Named Tom for Team Kelly, and season 1 winner Javier Colon and season 9 winner Jordan Smith for Team Adam. The artists and coaches selected the song they sang in the round. Each of the songs were songs that the artist once performed by themselves during the competition of the season they were on.

Kelly Clarkson won by a score of 2–1 to John Legend, earning her an extra artist in the finale.

In-Season All-Star Competition color key
Artist won the All-Star competition and their Coach received a point
Artist lost the All-Star competition

In-Season All-Star Competition results
Episode	Order	Winner			Loser		
Episode	Order	Coach	Song	Artist	Artist	Song	Coach
Episode 7 (Monday, April 6, 2026)	1	Kelly Clarkson	"Dust in the Wind"	Girl Named Tom	Renzo	"Dream On"	John Legend
Episode 7 (Monday, April 6, 2026)	2	John Legend	"Fields of Gold"	Maelyn Jarmon	Jordan Smith	"Chandelier"	Adam Levine
Episode 7 (Monday, April 6, 2026)	3	Kelly Clarkson	"Desperado"	Jake Hoot	Javier Colon	"Time After Time"	Adam Levine

== Semi-finals ==
The Top 9 performances aired on April 13, 2026, consisting of episode 8. The Top 9 artists, three from each team, performed with the results the same night. For the first time ever, a new voting block was composed of super-fans and past Voice artists. Also for the first time, the semi-finals and finale were pre-recorded and the artists did not perform live. The Top 4 artists (two from Kelly's team and one from Adam and John's respective teams) advanced to the finale.

Semi-finals color key
Artist was saved by studio audience's vote
Artist was eliminated

Semi-finals results
Episode	Coach	Order	Artist	Song	Result
Episode 8 (Monday, April 13, 2026)	John Legend	1	KJ Willis	"Higher Ground"	Eliminated
Episode 8 (Monday, April 13, 2026)	Kelly Clarkson	2	Mikenley Brown	"I'm Not the Only One"	Advanced
Episode 8 (Monday, April 13, 2026)	Adam Levine	3	Jeremy Keith	"Whip Appeal"	Eliminated
Episode 8 (Monday, April 13, 2026)	John Legend	4	Syd Millevoi	"Into You"	Eliminated
Episode 8 (Monday, April 13, 2026)	Adam Levine	5	Jared Shoemaker	"Soulshine"	Eliminated
Episode 8 (Monday, April 13, 2026)	Kelly Clarkson	6	Liv Ciara	"Flashdance... What a Feeling"	Advanced
Episode 8 (Monday, April 13, 2026)	Adam Levine	7	Alexia Jayy	"I Never Loved a Man (The Way I Love You)"	Advanced
Episode 8 (Monday, April 13, 2026)	Kelly Clarkson	8	JW Griffin	"Angel Flying Too Close to the Ground"	Eliminated
Episode 8 (Monday, April 13, 2026)	John Legend	9	Lucas West	"Maybe I'm Amazed"	Advanced

== Finale ==
The finale aired on April 14, 2026. The Top 4 artists each performed an up-tempo song, ballad, and duet with their coach for the title of The Voice. As with the semi-finals, super-fans and past Voice artists voted from the audience and the performances were not live. Daly revealed the winner at the end of the show.

Alexia Jayy won the season, marking Adam Levine's fourth win as a coach. Jayy became the first African-American female winner in the history of the show. Additionally, Levine became tied with Clarkson for the second-most winning coach on the show, behind Blake Shelton.

Finale results
Coach	Artist	Order	Up-tempo song	Order	Ballad	Order	Duet (with coach)	Result
Adam Levine	Alexia Jayy	1	"Lady Marmalade"	8	"One and Only"	10	"Sunday Morning"	Winner
Kelly Clarkson	Mikenley Brown	5	"Man I Need"	2	"Almost Is Never Enough"	12	"What Was I Made For?"	Fourth place
John Legend	Lucas West	3	"Cold as Ice"	6	"Ordinary People"	11	"Don't Let the Sun Go Down on Me"	Third place
Kelly Clarkson	Liv Ciara	7	"What a Girl Wants"	4	"The Greatest"	9	"Stay"	Runner-up

== Elimination chart ==
Results color key
Winner	Saved by the studio audience
Runner-up	Eliminated
Third place
Fourth place

Coaches color key
Team Legend
Team Kelly
Team Adam

=== Overall ===
Elimination chart for The Voice season 29
Artists	Semifinal	Finale
Alexia Jayy	Safe	Winner
Liv Ciara	Safe	Runner-up
Lucas West	Safe	Third place
Mikenley Brown	Safe	Fourth place
JW Griffin	Eliminated	Eliminated (Semi-finals)
Jeremy Keith	Eliminated	Eliminated (Semi-finals)
Syd Millevoi	Eliminated	Eliminated (Semi-finals)
Jared Shoemaker	Eliminated	Eliminated (Semi-finals)
KJ Willis	Eliminated	Eliminated (Semi-finals)

=== Per team ===
Elimination chart for The Voice season 29 per team
Artists	Semifinal	Finale
Lucas West	Advanced	Third place
Syd Millevoi	Eliminated	
KJ Willis	Eliminated	
Liv Ciara	Advanced	Runner-up
Mikenley Brown	Advanced	Fourth place
JW Griffin	Eliminated	
Alexia Jayy	Advanced	Winner
Jeremy Keith	Eliminated	
Jared Shoemaker	Eliminated	

== Ratings ==
Viewership and ratings per episode of The Voice season 29
No.	Title	Air date	Timeslot (ET)	Rating (18–49)	Viewers (millions)	DVR (18–49)	DVR viewers (millions)	Total (18–49)	Total viewers (millions)	Ref.
1	"The Blind Auditions Premiere"	February 23, 2026	Monday 9:00 p.m.	TBD	TBD	TBD	TBD	TBD	TBD	
2	"The Blind Auditions Part 2"	March 2, 2026	Monday 9:00 p.m.	TBD	TBD	TBD	TBD	TBD	TBD	
3	"The Blind Auditions Part 3"	March 9, 2026	Monday 9:00 p.m.	TBD	TBD	TBD	TBD	TBD	TBD	
4	"The Battles Premiere"	March 16, 2026	Monday 9:00 p.m.	TBD	TBD	TBD	TBD	TBD	TBD	
5	"The Battles Part 2"	March 23, 2026	Monday 9:00 p.m.	TBD	TBD	TBD	TBD	TBD	TBD	
6	"The Knockouts Premiere"	March 30, 2026	Monday 9:00 p.m.	TBD	TBD	TBD	TBD	TBD	TBD	
7	"The Knockouts Part 2"	April 6, 2026	Monday 9:00 p.m.	TBD	TBD	TBD	TBD	TBD	TBD	
8	"Semi-Finals Top 9"	April 13, 2026	Monday 9:00 p.m.	TBD	TBD	TBD	TBD	TBD	TBD	
9	"Recap: Semi-Finals Top 9"	April 14, 2026	Tuesday 8:00 p.m.	TBD	TBD	TBD	TBD	TBD	TBD	
10	"Finale Top 4"	April 14, 2026	Tuesday 9:00 p.m.	TBD	TBD	TBD	TBD	TBD	TBD	
