= VOX (TV series) =

Canadian teen talk television show

VOX was a teen talk television show broadcast by TVOntario and initially hosted by Patty Sullivan and Quddus. It ran from 2000 to 2006, and was broadcast weekly at 7PM on Sundays. It was broadcast in the US by WAM!.

Each episode in the show lasted 30 minutes, and was intended to be a way for "young people to explore ideas, issues and the world around them".
