= Jason Farol =

American singer (born 1993)

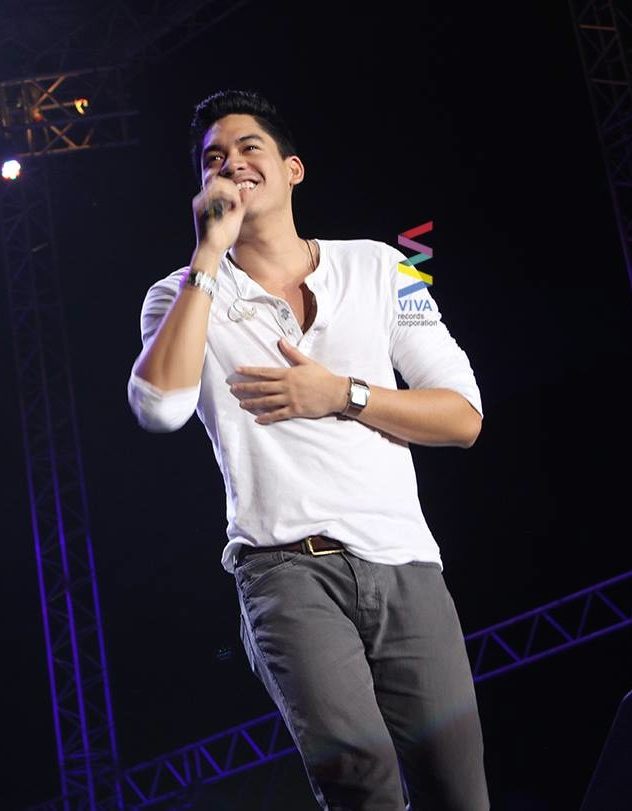
- Jason Farol FMF performance

Background information
- Born: April 3, 1989 (age 37); Torrance, California, United States
- Genres: Alternative pop
- Occupation: Singer
- Years active: 2012–present
- Labels: Viva Records; Viva Entertainment

Jason Roger Farol (born April 3, 1989) is an American singer from Redondo Beach, California, United States, who placed third in the American television series Duets, alongside mentor Kelly Clarkson. In August 2012, Farol signed with Viva Records, and released his debut Philippine album in October 2013.

== Life and career ==
=== Early life ===
Jason Farol was born in Torrance, California, on April 3, 1989. Farol's mother is of Filipino and Irish descent, and father of Filipino descent. Farol credits his first exposure to music was through his father, who is also a singer, and bought a Karaoke system where Farol began to be introduced to the musical styles of Jazz and Blues. In August 2011, he began attending California State University, Dominguez Hills in Carson, California, to pursue a degree in Occupational Therapy.

=== 2012: Duets ===
==== Overview ====
Farol auditioned for the ABC reality competition series Duets for a chance to be a part of Kelly Clarkson's team. Having successfully passed two rounds of auditions with producers, he auditioned in front of Clarkson, singing "At Last" by Etta James, and "When A Man Loves A Woman" by Percy Sledge. After advancing, Clarkson narrowed it down to two finalist to compete for a slot on the show. On April 10, 2012, during this round, Clarkson, brought Farol on stage during her Stronger Tour stop in San Diego to sing "Poison & Wine" by The Civil Wars. After a successful performance, Clarkson picked Farol to compete in the Top 8 as her duet partner.

On May 24, 2012, Duets premiered on ABC. Clarkson and Farol sang "Breaking Your Own Heart" off Clarkson's Stronger album. After the results were tallied, Farol found himself in last place among the 8 contestants. Farol consistently found himself in the bottom 2 over the next two weeks, and was up for elimination during the first eliminations of the season. Farol sung "Me and Mrs. Jones" as his save me song, and was saved by the judges. As the show progressed, Farol improved and made it to the top 5, live shows, where he consistently placed in the top 2. During the first Live Show, Farol and Clarkson sang "Mercy" by Duffy. In the top 4, during Standards week, Farol and Clarkson sang "Feeling Good" where he received his first standing ovation. In the Top 3 live shows, Farol earned himself another standing ovation from all four judges for his performance of "Runaway Baby" by Bruno Mars Farol secured a spot in the season finale where he took third place.

==== Performances/Results ====
Week #	Theme	Song Choice	Results
Audition	N/A	"At Last", When A Man Loves A Woman	Advanced
Concert Audition	N/A	Poison & Wine	Advanced
Week 1	Superstars Greatest Hits	"Breaking Your Own Heart"	8th place
Week 2	Classic Duets	"Whenever You Call"	7th Place
Top 8	Songs That Inspire	"Hallelujah" /Bottom 2 song - "Me and Mrs. Jones"	7th -Bottom 2 - Safe
Top 7	Party Songs	"(I Can't Get No) Satisfaction"	5th Place - Safe
Top 6	Movie Night	"Come What May"	6th - Bottom 2 - Safe
Top 5 - Live Shows	Songs From the 2000s	"Mercy"	Safe
Top 4 - Live Shows	Favorite Standards	"Feeling Good"	Top 2 - Safe
Top 3 - Live Shows	Superstars Choice	"Me and Mrs. Jones", 'Runaway Baby"	Top 2 - Safe
Finale	N/A	"Heartbreak Hotel"	3rd Place

== Post Duets Career ==
=== 2012–present ===
After Duets ended, Clarkson invited Farol to reprise their duet of "Mercy" at the Hollywood Bowl during her Stronger Tour stop on July 30, 2012. He would later sing the National Anthem for the Oakland A's and the Los Angeles Lakers In August 2012, Farol signed a record deal overseas in the Philippines with Viva Entertainment. In October 2013, Farol released his debut self-titled Philippine album, and participated in his first musical tour of the country. His first single off the album, "I Believe in Love Again" charted and peaked at #16 on Myx. On October 27, 2013, Farol made his Philippine television debut on ASAP 19 where he performed with Sarah Geronimo, singing Me and Mrs Jones. Following his duet with Geronimo, Farol became Sarah's opening act during her Perfect 10 Concert Tour. Farol then recorded the theme song for the Viva Film, "When The Love Is Gone". In the U.S., Farol collaborated with writers of Perfect Storm Music Group and released his first U.S. single and music video, "Contagious" in February 2014.

In 2014, Farol signed with ABS-CBN to join the television show ASAP. In June 2014, Farol performed alongside Basil Valdez and Mark Bautista during the 2014 Miss Manila Coronation. Farol's music video for his second Philippine single, "Kung Ikaw At Ako" was released in August 2014, featuring the ABS-CBN, Pure Love teleserye star, Yam Concepcion.

In January 2015, Farol was announced as part of the line up for Fusion Music Festival, the first Philippine music festival. A few months later in March, Farol's music video for his newest single, "Kahapon" debuted on Myx and MTV Pinoy. "Kahapon later became part of the soundtrack for the film "Your Place Or Mine?"

In 2016, Farol began working on his first E.P entitled "Walkabout" for the U.S. Farol released four singles from the E.P called "Decompress", "Dream", "Tonight", and "Bloom".

Farol released two singles, "Dizzy" and "Hooked" in 2019. Following the release, Farol collaborated with EDM producer, A-Leo. Together they released the track, "Don't Wanna Get Up" through Flamingo Recordings.

In 2026, Jason Farol recorded and performed a promotional jingle for the brand Warmies. In March 2026, Jason appeared on NBC’s twenty-ninth season of The Voice , entitled Battle of The Champions, a landmark season featuring an all-star panel of past championship-winning coaches. Although no coaches turned their chairs during his blind audition, Farol reunited with former collaborators Kelly Clarkson and John Legend, both of whom he had previously worked with on Duets. On May 1, 2026, Farol independently released the single "Heatwave".
