= Quddus (television personality) =

Canadian television host (born 1980)

- Born: Benjamin Quddus Philippe; July 10, 1980 (age 46); Toronto, Ontario, Canada
- Occupations: VJ, TV personality/Host
- Years active: 1999–2012
- Website: www.quddus.co

Benjamin Quddus Philippe (born July 10, 1980), known professionally as Quddus, is a Canadian television personality and actor, best known as the host of MTV's Total Request Live and ABC's singing competition show Duets.

== Early years ==
Quddus was born in 1980 in Toronto, Ontario to a Haitian father and Dutch mother. His distinct look propelled his modeling career at an early age. Quddus grew up in Ottawa, and was raised Catholic.

== Career ==
Quddus' professional career in broadcasting began in 2000 as a host and co-writer of VOX, a youth culture show on TVOntario, which went on to win a Gemini Award.

=== Total Request Live ===
He joined MTV as a VJ in 2001. He started out on The Mandy Moore Show. From 2001 to 2006, Quddus hosted Total Request Live, at the time one MTV's biggest shows. Quddus conducted daily interviews with stars such as Will Smith, Beyoncé, Jay-Z, Jake Gyllenhaal, Alicia Keys, Ben Affleck and Denzel Washington, and his work on Total Request Live led to both Usher and Britney Spears requesting him to host their Showtime concert specials. He also helped promote Kanye West, who was unknown at the time.

=== After TRL ===
After leaving MTV in 2006, Quddus worked as an A&R consultant for MySpace Records and other labels. He also hosted TV One Access, Nickelodeon's Dance on Sunset and ABC's Duets. He was a correspondent for Access Hollywood and has appeared on CSI: Miami, the CW's Half & Half, Girlfriends, as well as the indie film Life is Hot in Cracktown.

While working at MySpace Records, Quddus managed R&B singer Mateo. He has directed music videos for Mateo and Erin Christine. He also hosted The MySpace Music Feed, AOL and the Jonas Brothers' joint venture, Cambio Connect, and created his own website and video series, TheQside.com.

As of 2022, Quddus is a media and career coach.

== Charity ==
Quddus lends his time to the non-profit organization Generosity.org, volunteers at personal development workshops in Los Angeles, and went to Haiti on an aid mission.
