= Alexia Jayy =

American singer-songwriter

- Born: October 20, 1993 (age 32); Irvington, Alabama, U.S.
- Genres: R&B; soul
- Occupation: Singer
- Instrument: Vocals
- Years active: 2021–present
- Label: Republic
- Website: www.alexiajayy.com

Alexia Jayy (born October 20, 1993) is an American soul singer. She is the winner of season 29 of the American talent competition The Voice. She became the first African-American woman to win the show since its inception. She competed on the team coached by Adam Levine, giving Levine his fourth win as a coach on the show.

Jayy released her debut single, "Who Raised You" in 2021. In September 2025, Jayy released her debut EP, Mixed Emotions, which features six singles.

== Early life ==
Jayy was born in Irvington, Alabama, and describes beginning to sing at the age of two. She performed at the Apollo Theater at nine years old and continued to pursue singing throughout schooling.

== Career ==
=== 2021–2025: First releases and Mixed Emotions ===
Jayy released her debut single, "Who Raised You", in May 2021. The single references her experiences raising her child in modern-day America. Jayy followed this with additional singles and, in September 2025, released her debut EP, Mixed Emotions.

=== 2026–present: The Voice ===
Performances on The Voice season 29
| Round | Song | Original artist | Theme | Order | Original air date | Result |
|---|---|---|---|---|---|---|
| Blind Auditions | "(You Make Me Feel Like) A Natural Woman" | Carole King | —N/a | 1.2 | Feb. 23, 2026 | John Legend, Kelly Clarkson, and Adam Levine turned; elected to join Team Adam. |
| Battles (Top 30) | "Nightshift" (vs. Moses G.) | Commodores | —N/a | 4.7 | March 16, 2026 | Saved by Adam |
| Knockouts (Top 18) | "You Give Good Love" (vs. Bay Simpson) | Whitney Houston | —N/a | 6.3 | March 30, 2026 | Saved by Adam |
| Semi-finals (Top 9) | "I Never Loved a Man (The Way I Love You)" | Aretha Franklin | —N/a | 8.7 | April 13, 2026 | Saved by studio audience |
| Finale (Final 4) | "Lady Marmalade" | Labelle | Up-tempo song | 10.1 | April 14, 2026 | Winner |
| Finale (Final 4) | "One and Only" | Adele | Ballad | 10.8 | April 14, 2026 | Winner |
| Finale (Final 4) | "Sunday Morning" (Duet with Adam Levine) | Maroon 5 | Duet | 10.10 | April 14, 2026 | Winner |

In 2026, Jayy competed in the 29th season of The Voice. In the blind auditions, she sang "(You Make Me Feel Like) A Natural Woman" by Carole King. All of the season's three coaches (John Legend, Kelly Clarkson, and Adam Levine) turned their chairs for Jayy. After her performance, her son, Matthew, was brought onstage where he expressed his pleasure for Levine's music as the frontman of Maroon 5. Thus, Jayy chose Team Adam, where Levine selected Jayy to advance through the battle and knockout rounds of the show. After former Voice alumni voted Jayy to advance to the finale in the semi-final, Jayy was named the winner of the season on April 14, 2026, by the same in-studio voting bloc, marking Levine's fourth win and first win since season 9. Jayy became the first African-American female to win in the show's history. Jayy won $100,000 and a record deal with Republic Records, a label owned by Universal Music Group. Immediately following her win, her single "Rent Free" was released.

== Artistry ==
In an interview, Jayy claims her sound as "pure" and mentions that she aims to "sing straight from [her] heart" while performing. Additionally, she cites influences as Ray Charles, Sam Cooke, and Stevie Wonder.

== Discography ==
=== Singles ===
List of singles, showing year released, and the name of the album
| Title | Year | EP |
|---|---|---|
| "Who Raised You" | 2021 | —N/a |
| "It Ain't Easy" | 2021 | —N/a |
| "I Need a Man" | 2022 | —N/a |
| "Over and Done" | 2023 | —N/a |
| "Supposed 2" | 2023 | —N/a |
| "You" | 2023 | —N/a |
| "Can't Do This" | 2024 | —N/a |
| "Dilemma" | 2024 | —N/a |
| "Back to Love" | 2024 | Mixed Emotions |
| "Forever Always" | 2025 | Mixed Emotions |
| "Give Me Sum" | 2025 | Mixed Emotions |
| "Famous" | 2025 | Mixed Emotions |
| "Mama's Cookin" | 2025 | Mixed Emotions |
| "Care for You" | 2025 | Mixed Emotions |
| "Rhythm Guide" | 2025 | —N/a |
| "Let It Snow" | 2025 | —N/a |
| "I Like It Like That" | 2025 | —N/a |
| "Sprung" | 2025 | —N/a |
| "Feels Right" | 2026 | —N/a |
| "Rent Free" | 2026 | —N/a |

Awards and achievements
| Preceded by Aiden Ross | The Voice (American); Winner; 2026 (Spring) | Succeeded by TBD by Fall 2026 |
| Preceded by "The Winner Takes It All" | The Voice (American); Winner's song "Lady Marmalade"; 2026 (Spring) | Succeeded by TBD by Fall 2026 |
