= Meleán =

Meleán is a surname. Notable people with the surname include:

- Alejandro Meleán (born 1987), American-Bolivian football player
- Jill-Michele Meleán, American actress and stand-up comedian
- Yoraxi Meleán (born 1975), Venezuelan-Spanish volleyball player

== See also ==
- Meleana
- Meleane
