= Duets (TV series) =

- Genre: Reality television
- Presented by: Quddus
- Starring: Kelly Clarkson; John Legend; Jennifer Nettles; Robin Thicke
- Country of origin: United States
- Original language: English
- No. of seasons: 1
- No. of episodes: 9

Production
- Executive producers: Robert Deaton; Charles Wachter
- Production company: Keep Calm and Carry On Productions

Original release
- Network: ABC
- Release: May 24 – July 19, 2012

Duets is a singing competition reality television show that premiered on May 24, 2012 on ABC. The show starred Kelly Clarkson, John Legend, Robin Thicke, and Jennifer Nettles as mentors who search for singers to duet with them as they perform in front of a live studio audience. Quddus serves as the host. The show is a production of Keep Calm and Carry On Productions. Robert Deaton and Charles Wachter are the executive producers.

On April 30, 2012, it was confirmed that John Legend had replaced Lionel Richie as a mentor on the show; Richie left the show citing "personal scheduling conflicts."

== Premise ==
Clarkson, Thicke, Legend, and Nettles travel across America to find two singers each who serve as their duet partners for the show. Each week, the mentor and one of their two duet partners perform live in front of a studio audience. The contestants then receive feedback from the other stars—and graded anonymously—on their performances. At the end of the night the eight contestants are ranked on a chart. The two contestants at the bottom of the chart face-off. The loser is eliminated. After six weeks, the show goes live and the audience begins to vote on the outcome of each episode.

At the end of the competition, the winning singer wins a recording contract with Hollywood Records.

"The simple fact that I get to go out and find two people I believe in, sing with them every week and help them accomplish their dream is an amazing thing I can't wait to be a part of," stated Clarkson in a press release statement from ABC.

== Artists ==
Artist	Age	Hometown	Finish
Johnny Gray^{1}	37	Shoreline, Washington	9th^{1}
Alexis Foster	21	Knoxville, Tennessee	8th
Meleana Brown^{1}	27	Oahu, Hawaii	7th
Jordan Meredith	22	Kimberly, Wisconsin	6th
Olivia Chisholm	21	Charlotte, North Carolina	5th
Bridget Carrington	30	Richmond, Virginia	4th
Jason Farol	22	Torrance, California	3rd
John Glosson	32	Douglas, Georgia	Runner-Up
J. Rome Wayne	29	Laurel, Maryland	Winner

The artist was partnered with Jennifer Nettles
The artist was partnered with Robin Thicke
The artist was partnered with Kelly Clarkson
The artist was partnered with John Legend

^{1}Johnny Gray was one of the two partners for John Legend on the initial broadcast. He did not return for the second show and was replaced by Meleana Brown. The show's host said this was "due to unforeseen circumstances". Gray did not give a reason on Twitter but had several tweets that said he did not 'drop out'.

== Overview ==
=== Episode 1 ===
Theme: Superstars' Greatest Hits
Air date: May 24, 2012
Special performance: Kelly Clarkson, John Legend, Jennifer Nettles, and Robin Thicke – "Let Me Entertain You"

Order	Artist	Partner	Song	Leaderboard
1	J Rome	Jennifer Nettles	"Tonight"	1st
2	Johnny Gray	John Legend	"Ordinary People"	2nd
3	Olivia Chisholm	Robin Thicke	"Lost Without U"	5th
4	Jason Farol	Kelly Clarkson	"Breaking Your Own Heart"	8th
5	Bridget Carrington	John Legend	"Tonight (Best You Ever Had)"	6th
6	John Glosson	Jennifer Nettles	"Stay"	4th
7	Alexis Foster	Robin Thicke	"Magic"	3rd
8	Jordan Meredith	Kelly Clarkson	"Stronger (What Doesn't Kill You)"	7th

=== Episode 2 ===
Theme: Classic Duets
Air date: May 31, 2012
Special performance: Kelly Clarkson and Robin Thicke – "State of Shock"

Order	Artist	Partner	Song	Leaderboard
1	Bridget Carrington	John Legend	"I Knew You Were Waiting (For Me)"	3rd
2	Jordan Meredith	Kelly Clarkson	"Misery"	5th
3	John Glosson	Jennifer Nettles	"Ain't No Mountain High Enough"	4th
4	Olivia Chisholm	Robin Thicke	"Where Is the Love"	8th
5	Meleana Brown	John Legend	"Endless Love"	1st
6	Jason Farol	Kelly Clarkson	"Whenever You Call"	7th
7	J Rome	Jennifer Nettles	"You're the One That I Want"	1st
8	Alexis Foster	Robin Thicke	"You're All I Need to Get By"	6th

=== Episode 3 ===
Theme: Songs That Inspire
Air date: June 7, 2012
Special performance: Jennifer Nettles and John Legend – I've Got The Music In Me"

Order	Artist	Partner	Song	Leaderboard	Result
1	Alexis Foster	Robin Thicke	"Killing Me Softly with His Song"	8th	Eliminated
2	John Glosson	Jennifer Nettles	"How Great Thou Art"	2nd	Safe
3	Jordan Meredith	Kelly Clarkson	"Mama's Broken Heart"	3rd	Safe
4	Meleana Brown	John Legend	"If I Ain't Got You"	5th	Safe
5	Olivia Chisholm	Robin Thicke	"Crazy in Love"	6th	Safe
6	J Rome	Jennifer Nettles	"How Am I Supposed to Live Without You"	1st	Safe
7	Jason Farol	Kelly Clarkson	"Hallelujah"	7th	Bottom two
8	Bridget Carrington	John Legend	"I Heard It Through the Grapevine"	4th	Safe

Bottom Two

Artist	Song	Result
Jason Farol	"Me and Mrs. Jones"	Safe
Alexis Foster	"(You Make Me Feel Like) A Natural Woman"	Eliminated

=== Episode 4 ===
Theme: Party Songs
Air date: June 13, 2012

Order	Artist	Partner	Song	Leaderboard	Result
1	Jason Farol	Kelly Clarkson	"(I Can't Get No) Satisfaction"	5th	Safe
2	Bridget Carrington	John Legend	"Last Dance"	2nd	Safe
3	J Rome	Jennifer Nettles	"P.Y.T. (Pretty Young Thing)"	1st	Safe
4	Olivia Chisholm	Robin Thicke	"Let's Stay Together"	7th	Bottom two
5	Jordan Meredith	Kelly Clarkson	"I Love Rock 'n' Roll"	4th	Safe
6	Meleana Brown	John Legend	"Since U Been Gone"	6th	Eliminated
7	John Glosson	Jennifer Nettles	"Life Is a Highway"	3rd	Safe

Bottom 2

Artist	Song	Result
Meleana Brown	"Saving All My Love for You"	Eliminated
Olivia Chisholm	"I Can't Make You Love Me"	Safe

=== Episode 5 ===
Theme: Movie Night
Air date: June 20, 2012

Order	Artist	Partner	Song	Leaderboard	Result
1	John Glosson	Jennifer Nettles	"My Heart Will Go On"	2nd	Safe
2	Jordan Meredith	Kelly Clarkson	"Take My Breath Away"	5th	Eliminated
3	Olivia Chisholm	Robin Thicke	"Stayin' Alive"	4th	Safe
4	Bridget Carrington	John Legend	"What's Love Got to Do with It"	3rd	Safe
5	J Rome	Jennifer Nettles	"I Will Always Love You"	1st	Safe
6	Jason Farol	Kelly Clarkson	"Come What May"	6th	Bottom two

Bottom 2

Artist	Song	Result
Jason Farol	"Mamma Knows Best"	Safe
Jordan Meredith	"And I Am Telling You I'm Not Going"	Eliminated

=== Episode 6 ===
Theme: Songs from the 2000s
Air date: June 28, 2012
Special performance: Kelly Clarkson, John Legend, Jennifer Nettles & Robin Thicke – "Freedom! '90"
Note: First live show of the season.

Order	Artist	Partner	Song	Result
1	John Glosson	Jennifer Nettles	"When You Say You Love Me"	Safe
2	Olivia Chisholm	Robin Thicke	"Need You Now"	Eliminated
3	Jason Farol	Kelly Clarkson	"Mercy"	Safe
4	Bridget Carrington	John Legend	"Halo"	Bottom Two
5	J Rome	Jennifer Nettles	"Without You"	Safe

=== Episode 7 ===
Theme: Favorite Standards
Air date: July 5, 2012
Special performances: Jennifer Nettles, Robin Thicke – "Crazy Little Thing Called Love"; Kelly Clarkson, John Legend – "You Don't Know Me"

Order	Artist	Partner	Song	Result
1	Bridget Carrington	John Legend	"Unforgettable"	Eliminated
2	J Rome	Jennifer Nettles	"God Bless the Child"	Safe
3	John Glosson	Jennifer Nettles	"Georgia On My Mind"	Bottom two
4	Jason Farol	Kelly Clarkson	"Feeling Good"	Safe

=== Episode 8 ===
Theme: Superstars Choice
Air date: July 12, 2012
Special Performance: Kelly Clarkson, Jennifer Nettles, John Legend and Robin Thicke – "Get Ready"

Order	Artist	Partner	Duet song	Order	Solo song	Result
1	J Rome	Jennifer Nettles	"Breakeven"	4	"Signed, Sealed & Delivered"	Safe
2	Jason Farol	Kelly Clarkson	"Me and Mrs. Jones"	6	"Runaway Baby"	Safe
3	John Glosson	Jennifer Nettles	"The Prayer"	5	"Bless the Broken Road"	Bottom two

=== Episode 9 ===
- Finale:
- Air date: July 19, 2012
- Special Performances: Kelly Clarkson and Jennifer Nettles – "Would I Lie To You?", John Legend and Bridget Carrington – "Gimme Shelter", Robin Thicke and Olivia Chisholm – "Fever", J Rome – "Signed, Sealed & Delivered"

Order	Artist	Partner	Duet Song	Result
1	John Glosson	Jennifer Nettles	"For Good"	Runner-up
2	Jason Farol	Kelly Clarkson	"Heartbreak Hotel"	3rd
3	J Rome	Jennifer Nettles	"Rhythm of the Night"	Winner

== Elimination chart ==
Week:		5/24	5/31	6/7	6/13	6/20	7/5	7/12	7/19
Place	Artist	Result							
1	J Rome	1st	1st	1st	1st	1st	Safe	Safe	Winner
2	John Glosson	4th	4th	2nd	3rd	2nd	Safe	3rd	Runner-up
3	Jason Farol	8th	7th	7th	5th	6th	Safe	Safe	Third place
4	Bridget Carrington	6th	3rd	4th	2nd	3rd	4th	Elim	Eliminated (Week 7)
5	Olivia Chisholm	5th	8th	6th	7th	4th	Elim	Eliminated (Week 6)	
6	Jordan Meredith	7th	5th	3rd	4th	Elim	Eliminated (Week 5)		
7	Meleana Brown		1st	5th	Elim	Eliminated (Week 4)			
8	Alexis Foster	3rd	6th	Elim	Eliminated (Week 3)				
9	Johnny Gray	2nd	Left	Withdrew (Week 1 & 2)					

The artist was first on the leaderboard.
The artist was in the bottom two on the leaderboard.
The artist was in the bottom two from viewer voting.
The artist was eliminated.
The artist left/removed from the competition.

== Broadcast history ==
Duets premiered on May 24, 2012 on American Broadcasting Company with a two-hour episode. The series continued to air on Thursdays at 8:00 p.m. until June 7. Due to the NBA Finals, The show was scheduled to move to Wednesdays at 9:30 p.m. for two 90-minute installments starting June 13. The show returned to its original time slot on Thursday, June 28 with one-hour episodes until July 19.

It was announced in June 2012 that ABC canceled the series.

=== International broadcasts ===
Country	TV network(s)	Weekly schedule (local time)	Period
Canada	Global TV	Simsubs of U.S. stations	Season 1
Spain	MTV	Morning	Season 1

=== International versions ===
Country	TV network(s)	Name	Host	Season	Coaches	Winner	Status
China	BTV	最美和声	Yang Kun (season 1); Li kun (season 2 - 3)	Season 1: 2013; Season 2: 2014; Season 3: 2015	Jam Hsiao (season 1 - 3); Chen Yufan (season 1); Hu Haiquan (Yu Quan) (season 1); Christine Fan (season 1); Huang Qishan (season 2); David Tao (season 2); Sun Nan (season 2); Yang Kun (season 3); Jason Zhang (season 3); Sitar Tan (season 3)	TBA	Discontinuted
Jordan	Amman TV	Duets غني ع الصح	saad zghoul Diana areeqat	season 1:2018/2019	Hussein Al-Salman(season 1); Linda Hegazi(Season 1); Metaab Al-Saqqar(Season 1); Saad Abu Tayeh(Season 1)		

== U.S. Nielsen ratings ==
Episode	Timeslot	First airdate	Rating (18–49)	Share (18–49)	Nightly rank (18–49)	Viewers (millions)	Nightly rank
1	Thursday; 8:00–10:00pm	May 24, 2012	1.7	6	3 (tie)	6.76	4
2	Thursday; 8:00–10:00pm	May 31, 2012	1.5	5	3 (tie)	5.92	5
3	Thursday; 8:00–10:00pm	June 7, 2012	1.2	4	8	5.27	6
4	Wednesday; 9:30–11:00pm	June 13, 2012	1.1	3	6 (tie)	3.95	7
5	Wednesday; 9:30–11:00pm	June 20, 2012	1.2	4	5	4.19	6 (tie)
6	Thursday; 8:00–9:00pm	June 28, 2012	1.0	3	9 (tie)	4.30	8
7	Thursday; 8:00–9:00pm	July 5, 2012	1.0	3	9	4.77	7
8	Thursday; 8:00–9:00pm	July 12, 2012	1.0	4	10	4.73	7 (tie)
9	Thursday; 8:00–9:00pm	July 19, 2012	1.0	3	8 (tie)	4.48	7
