= Meleana (musician) =

American Christian musician (born 1988)

- Birth name: Meleana Brown
- Born: 1988; Honolulu, Hawaii
- Origin: Los Angeles, California
- Genres: Christian pop, Christian EDM, Christian R&B
- Occupation(s): Singer, songwriter
- Instrument: Vocals
- Years active: 2003–present
- Labels: Dream
- Website: meleanabrown.com

Meleana Brown (born September 11, 1988), known professionally as Meleana, is an American Christian musician. She started her music career, in 2003, with appearing on American Idol during season 3, where she was eliminated during Hollywood Week. Her next appearance was on the only season of Duets. Brown signed with Dream Records, where they released her first studio album, White Walls (2016).

== Early life ==
Brown was born, Meleana Brown, on September 11, 1988, in Honolulu, Hawaii, where she was raised their and in Japan, when her family relocated for a while. Her cousin is Nicole Scherzinger. Her ethnicity is Hawaiian, Filipino, African-American, Spanish and Portuguese.

== Career ==
Her music career started in 2003, with her appearance on American Idol during season 3, where she was eliminated during the Hollywood Week of the competition. She appeared on the only season of Duets, performing with John Legend. Meleana was signed to Dream Records, where they released her first studio album, White Walls, on November 18, 2016.

== Discography ==
=== Studio albums ===
- White Walls (2016)
