= Hinder discography =

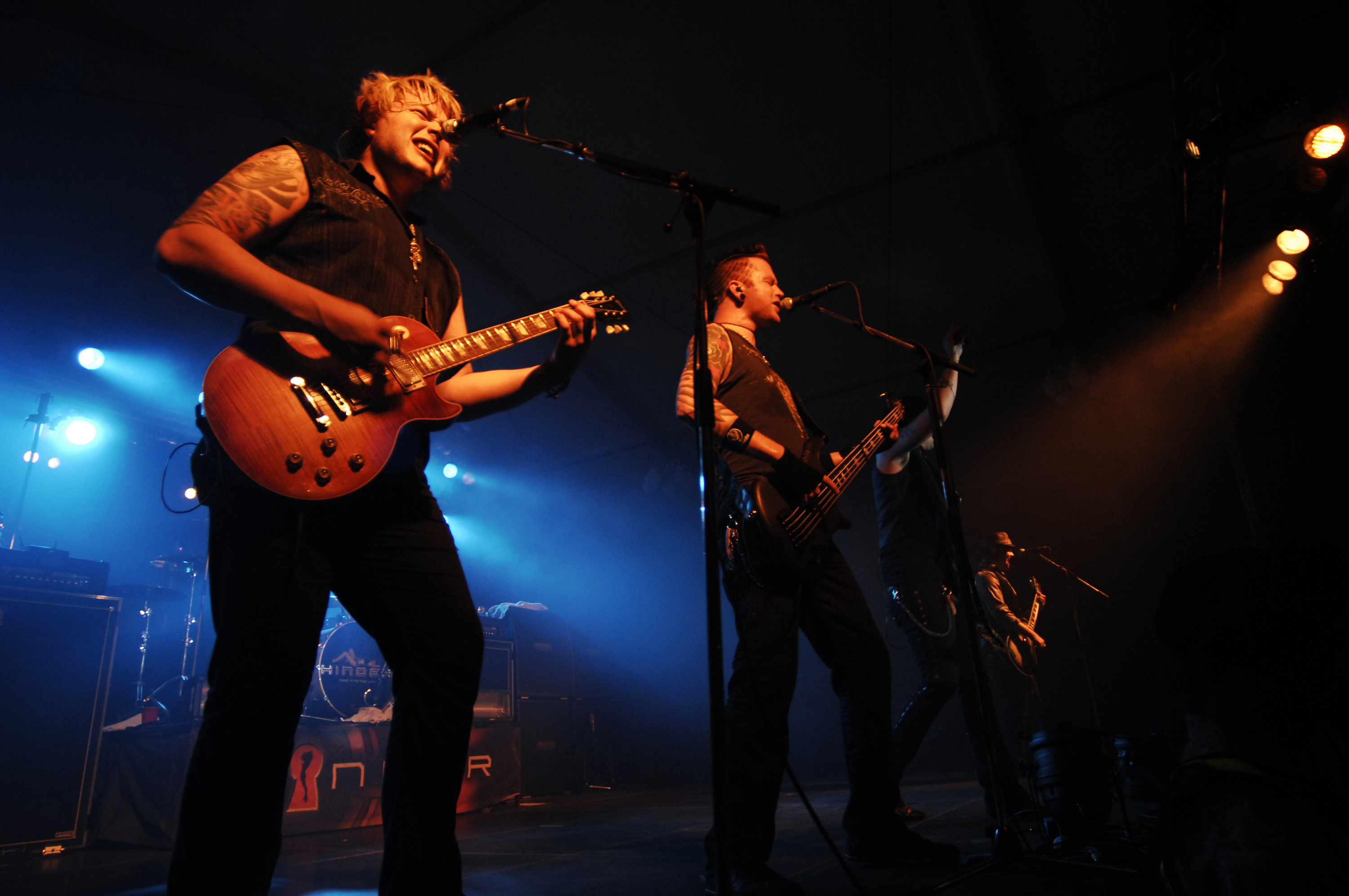
- Studio albums: 7
- Extended plays: 2
- Singles: 31
- Promotional singles: 1
- Music videos: 19

American rock band Hinder has released seven studio albums, two extended plays, 31 singles, one promotional single, and nineteen music videos. The group's most successful song to date, "Lips of an Angel", was released in 2006 and reached the top five of multiple national record charts, including topping the Australian and New Zealand singles charts. Five of the band's single have reached the top ten of the Billboard Mainstream Rock airplay chart, having reached the tier most recently with "All American Nightmare" in 2010.

== Studio albums ==
List of studio albums, with selected chart positions and certifications
Title	Album details	Peak chart positions								Certifications
Title	Album details	US	US Rock	US Alt.	AUS	CAN	JPN	NZ	UK	Certifications
Extreme Behavior	Released: September 27, 2005; Label: Universal Republic; Formats: CD, LP, digital download	6	2	22	1	13	91	9	168	RIAA: 3× Platinum; ARIA: Platinum; MC: Platinum; RMNZ: Platinum
Take It to the Limit	Released: November 4, 2008; Label: Universal Republic; Formats: CD, LP, digital download	4	3	2	44	11	99	—	—	RIAA: Gold
All American Nightmare	Released: December 7, 2010; Label: Universal Republic; Formats: CD, LP, digital download	37	3	1	—	77	—	—	—	
Welcome to the Freakshow	Released: December 4, 2012; Label: Republic; Formats: CD, digital download	65	14	8	—	—	177	—	—	
When the Smoke Clears	Released: May 12, 2015; Label: The End; Formats: CD, LP, digital download	75	10	8	—	—	—	—	—	
The Reign	Released: August 11, 2017; Label: The End; Formats: CD, LP, digital download	—	—	—	—	—	—	—	—	
Back to Life	Released: May 23, 2025; Label: Evil Teen; Formats: CD, LP, digital download	—	—	—	—	—	—	—	—	
"—" denotes a recording that did not chart or was not released in that territory.

== Extended plays ==
List of extended plays
Title	EP details
Far from Close	Released: July 13, 2003; Label: Brickden; Formats: CD, digital download
Stripped	Released: May 13, 2016; Label: The End; Formats: CD, digital download

== Singles ==
List of singles, with selected chart positions and certifications, showing year released and album name
Title	Year	Peak chart positions										Certifications	Album
Title	Year	US	US Adult	US Alt.	US Main. Rock	AUS	AUT	CAN	NLD	NZ	UK	Certifications	Album
"Get Stoned"	2005	— (Note: "Get Stoned" did not enter the Billboard Hot 100, but peaked at number three on the Bubbling Under Hot 100 Singles chart, which acts as an extension to the Hot 100.)	—	37	4	—	—	—	—	—	138	RIAA: Gold	Extreme Behavior
"Lips of an Angel"	2006	3	3	8	3	1	62	31 (Note: "Lips of an Angel" reached as high as 31 on the Billboard Canadian Hot 100 after the chart was initiated in 2007, but the song had previously reached a peak position of 2 on the Hot Canadian Digital Songs ranking that was used as the basis for the Canadian Singles Chart.)	98	1	—	RIAA: 4× Platinum; ARIA: Platinum; BPI: Silver; RMNZ: 3× Platinum	Extreme Behavior
"How Long"	2006	—	—	—	6	—	—	—	—	—	—		Extreme Behavior
"Better Than Me"	2007	31	10	37	16	11	—	16	—	16	—	RMNZ: Gold	Extreme Behavior
"Homecoming Queen"	2007	—	—	—	16	— (Note: "Homecoming Queen" did not enter the ARIA Singles Chart, but peaked at number 60 on the ARIA Physical Singles Chart.)	—	100	—	—	—		Extreme Behavior
"By the Way"	2007	—	—	—	—	—	—	—	—	—	—		Extreme Behavior
"Use Me"	2008	— (Note: "Use Me" did not enter the Billboard Hot 100, but peaked at number two on the Bubbling Under Hot 100 Singles chart, which acts as an extension to the Hot 100.)	—	25	3	—	—	79	—	—	—		Take It to the Limit
"Without You"	2008	85	24	—	32	—	—	94	—	—	—		Take It to the Limit
"The Best Is Yet to Come"	2008	—	—	—	—	—	—	—	—	—	—		Take It to the Limit
"Up All Night"	2009	—	—	—	16	—	—	—	—	—	—		Take It to the Limit
"Loaded and Alone"	2009	—	—	—	37	—	—	—	—	—	—		Take It to the Limit
"All American Nightmare"	2010	—	—	—	6	—	—	—	—	—	—		All American Nightmare
"What Ya Gonna Do"	2011	—	—	—	20	—	—	—	—	—	—		All American Nightmare
"The Life"	2011	— (Note: "The Life" did not enter the Billboard Hot 100, but peaked at number 19 on the Bubbling Under Hot 100 Singles chart, which acts as an extension to the Hot 100.)	—	—	—	—	—	—	—	—	—		All American Nightmare
"Red Tail Lights"	2012	—	—	—	—	—	—	—	—	—	—		All American Nightmare
"Save Me"	2012	—	—	—	23	—	—	—	—	—	—		Welcome to the Freakshow
"Ladies Come First"	2012	—	—	—	—	—	—	—	—	—	—		Welcome to the Freakshow
"Is It Just Me"	2013	—	—	—	—	—	—	—	—	—	—		Welcome to the Freakshow
"Should Have Known Better"	2013	—	—	—	—	—	—	—	—	—	—		Welcome to the Freakshow
"Talk to Me"	2013	—	—	—	—	—	—	—	—	—	—		Welcome to the Freakshow
"Hit the Ground"	2014	—	—	—	34	—	—	—	—	—	—		When the Smoke Clears
"Intoxicated"	2015	—	—	—	—	—	—	—	—	—	—		When the Smoke Clears
"Remember Me"	2017	—	—	—	39	—	—	—	—	—	—		The Reign
"The Reign"	2017	—	—	—	—	—	—	—	—	—	—		The Reign
"Making It Hard"	2017	—	—	—	—	—	—	—	—	—	—		The Reign
"Long Gone"	2018	—	—	—	—	—	—	—	—	—	—		The Reign
"Halo"	2019	—	—	—	—	—	—	—	—	—	—		Non-album singles
"Life in the Fast Lane"	2019	—	—	—	—	—	—	—	—	—	—		Non-album singles
"Unstoppable" (with No Resolve)	2023	—	—	—	—	—	—	—	—	—	—		Non-album singles
"Live Without It"	2024	—	—	—	17	—	—	—	—	—	—		Back to Life
"Everything Is a Cult"	2024	—	—	—	—	—	—	—	—	—	—		Back to Life
"Bring Me Back to Life"	2025	—	—	—	38	—	—	—	—	—	—		Back to Life
"Bad Decisions"	2025	—	—	—	—	—	—	—	—	—	—		Back to Life
"—" denotes a recording that did not chart or was not released in that territory.

== Other appearances ==
List of non-single guest appearances, showing year released and album name
Title	Year	Album
"The Fight's About to Begin"	2011	Official Gameday Music of the NFL

== Music videos ==
List of music videos, showing year released and director
Title	Year	Director(s)
"Get Stoned"	2006	Zach Merck
"Lips of an Angel"	2006	Nigel Dick
"How Long"	2006	Zach Nial
"Homecoming Queen"	2006	Zach Nial
"Born to Be Wild"	2007	Craig Barry
"Better Than Me"	2007	Nigel Dick
"Use Me"	2008	Wayne Isham
"Without You"	2008	Travis Kopach
"Up All Night"	2009	—N/a
"All American Nightmare"	2010	John Ales and Trevor Gilchrist
"What Ya Gonna Do"	2011	Andrew Bennett
"Hit the Ground"	2015	—N/a
"Wasted Life"	2015	—N/a
"Remember Me"	2017	Casey Vesely and Reagan Elkins
"King of the Letdown"	2018	—N/a
"Unstoppable"	2023	Travis Ross and Sam Ross
"Live Without It"	2024	—N/a
"Everything Is a Cult"	2024	Reagan Elkins
"Bring Me Back To Life"	2025	Reagan Elkins
