= Stripped (Hinder EP) =

EP by Hinder
- Released: May 13, 2016
- Recorded: 2016
- Genre: Acoustic rock; post-grunge
- Length: 21:26
- Label: The End
- Producer: Marshal Dutton; Cody Hanson

Hinder chronology
When the Smoke Clears (2015)	Stripped (2016)	The Reign (2017)

Stripped is an acoustic EP by American rock band Hinder. The EP was released May 13, 2016 via The End Records. This release marked the band's first acoustic-only project and is overall their second EP, the first being their 2003 debut Far from Close.

== Summary ==
Before playing a show at the venue Ziggy's By The Sea in Wilmington, North Carolina on January 6, 2016 the band was interviewed by The Baltimore Sun, during the interview the group announced that they had begun working on an acoustic EP and already started writing for their next studio album, singer Marshal Dutton said the projects should be released by the end of the year.

On March 7, 2016 the band announced that the acoustic EP will be titled Stripped and will be released May 13, 2016. The EP will consist of 6 songs, 5 songs will be acoustic renditions of previously recorded Hinder tracks while the first track will be a cover of the group K's Choice song "Not an Addict". Altogether the EP will consist of one newly recorded track, four acoustic versions of songs from the band's 2015 album When the Smoke Clears and a newly recorded version of the band's 2005 hit "Get Stoned" with new vocalist Marshal Dutton singing vocals. The band also announced that they will be touring June–July 2016 with New Zealand-based rockers Like a Storm in support of the EP.

Vocalist Marshal Dutton commented on the EP saying; "We’re thrilled to finally be able to release this acoustic EP. When we write songs, we believe that they have to be great with just an acoustic guitar. The rest of the instrumentation is just icing on the cake. We can’t wait get out on the road and show our fans our music in its original form."

== Track listing ==
No.	Title	Writer(s)	Length
1.	"Not an Addict"	Gert Bettens; Sarah Bettens	4:10
2.	"Intoxicated"	Marshal Dutton; Cody Hanson; Ryan Hurd; Joey Hyde	3:19
3.	"Wasted Life"	Marshal Dutton; Cody Hanson; Westin Davis; Erik Dylan	3:21
4.	"Hit the Ground"	Marshal Dutton; Cody Hanson; Corey Crowder; Matthew McGinn	3:18
5.	"If Only For Tonight"	Marshal Dutton; Cody Hanson; Justin Richards	3:36
6.	"Get Stoned"	Austin John Winkler; Cody Hanson; Brian Howes; Joey Moi	3:44
Total length:			21:16

== Personnel ==
- Marshal Dutton – lead vocals
- Joe "Blower" Garvey – lead guitar, backing vocals
- Mark King – rhythm guitar, backing vocals
- Mike Rodden – bass guitar, backing vocals
- Cody Hanson – drums, backing vocals
