= Use Me (Hinder song) =

2008 single by Hinder

Single by Hinder

from the album Take It to the Limit
- Released: July 15, 2008
- Recorded: 2008
- Length: 3:50
- Label: Universal
- Songwriters: Austin Winkler, Cody Hanson, Brian Howes
- Producer: Hinder

Hinder singles chronology
"Born to Be Wild" (2007)	"Use Me" (2008)	"Without You" (2008)

"Use Me" is the first single from the American rock band Hinder's 2008 album, Take It to the Limit. It was released as a digital download through the band's website on July 15, 2008, and made available on iTunes on July 29, 2008. It is one of the songs that marked a change in direction in Hinder's music, transitioning from post-grunge to more of a glam metal sound, while still retaining the post-grunge and hard rock influences that were used on Hinder's previous album, Extreme Behavior. The song was put on as downloadable content for the video games Guitar Hero: World Tour and Rock Band 2.

== Music video ==
A video was made for the song. It depicts the band arriving at a large mansion where a large party is occurring along with many women. Andrew Dice Clay stands at the door and acts as a bouncer. Intercutting with scenes of the band performing the song in front of the houseguests, the video follows a mysterious blonde woman. This woman proceeds to seduce and have sex with all the members of the band. The climax occurs when the blonde walks past the band and they realize that they all have slept with her. It ends with them toasting to their conquests and praising the madness of the party.

== Chart performance ==
The single debuted at number 36 on the Billboard Mainstream Rock Tracks chart, peaking at number three in September 2008. It "bubbled under" the Billboard Hot 100 song chart, reaching number two on the Bubbling Under Hot 100 Singles chart.

=== Charts ===
Chart (2008)	Peak position
Canada Hot 100 (Billboard)	79
Canada Rock (Billboard)	9
US Billboard Bubbling Under Hot 100 Singles	2
US Billboard Mainstream Rock Tracks	3
US Billboard Modern Rock Tracks	25
US Billboard Pop 100	96

== Release history ==
Region	Date	Format(s)	Label	Ref.
United States	July 14, 2008	Active rock; alternative radio	Universal Republic	
