= Homecoming Queen (Hinder song) =

2007 single by Hinder

Single by Hinder

from the album Extreme Behavior
- Released: June 25, 2007
- Studio: The Armoury (Vancouver, British Columbia)
- Length: 4:39
- Label: Universal
- Songwriters: Hinder; Brian Howes
- Producer: Brian Howes

Hinder singles chronology
"Better Than Me" (2007)	"Homecoming Queen" (2007)	"By the Way" (2008)

"Homecoming Queen" is a song by the American rock band Hinder. It was released as the fifth single from their debut album Extreme Behavior.

The song bears a strong resemblance to "Sweet Child o' Mine" by Guns N' Roses.

== Chart performance ==
The song peaked at number 16 on the Billboard Mainstream Rock chart and debuted at number 100 on the Canadian Hot 100.

== Charts ==
Chart (2007)	Peak Position
Australia Physical Singles (ARIA)	60
Canada Hot 100 (Billboard)	100
Canada Rock (Billboard)	8
US Mainstream Rock (Billboard)	16

== Release history ==
Region	Date	Format(s)	Label	Ref.
United States	June 25, 2007	Active rock; alternative radio	Universal Republic	
Australia	October 20, 2007	CD single	Universal Republic	
