= All American Nightmare (song) =

Single by Hinder

from the album All American Nightmare
- Released: September 14, 2010
- Recorded: 2010
- Genre: Alternative rock, hard rock, post-grunge
- Length: 3:17
- Label: Universal
- Songwriters: Austin John Winkler; Cody Hanson; The Warren Brothers; Kevin Churko; Marshal Dutton
- Producer: Kevin Churko

Hinder singles chronology
"Loaded and Alone" (2009)	"All American Nightmare" (2010)	"What Ya Gonna Do" (2011)

"All American Nightmare" is the first single from the album of the same name by American rock band Hinder. It was released on September 14, 2010, on Universal Republic Records and became available for digital download on October 5. It debuted on both the Active Rock and Mainstream Rock Tracks charts at number 30, and peaking on the Rock Songs chart at number 22.

== Music video ==
The music video for the song, where the band is not shown, features model Jesse Lee Denning as a "tattooed hellion within her own nightmare struggles."
