= Save Me (Hinder song) =

Single by Hinder

from the album Welcome to the Freakshow
- Released: August 30, 2012
- Recorded: 2012
- Length: 2:46
- Label: Universal Republic
- Songwriters: Austin John Winkler; Cody Hanson; The Warren Brothers
- Producers: Marshal Dutton, Cody Hanson

Hinder singles chronology
"Red Tail Lights" (2012)	"Save Me" (2012)	"Ladies Come First" (2012)

"Save Me" is a single by American rock band Hinder from their album Welcome to the Freakshow. It was released on August 30, 2012, by Republic Records. The song debuted on the Active Rock Chart at number 23.

== Charts ==
Chart (2013)	Peak position
US Mainstream Rock (Billboard)	25
