= How Long (Hinder song) =

2006 single by Hinder

Single by Hinder

from the album Extreme Behavior
- Released: October 16, 2006
- Studio: The Armoury (Vancouver, British Columbia)
- Genre: Hard rock
- Length: 3:24
- Label: Universal
- Songwriters: Hinder; Brian Howes; Joey Moi
- Producer: Brian Howes

Hinder singles chronology
"Lips of an Angel" (2006)	"How Long" (2006)	"Better Than Me" (2007)

"How Long" is a song by the American rock band Hinder. It was released as the third single from their debut album Extreme Behavior. The song reached No. 6 on the Billboard Mainstream Rock Tracks chart in the United States. The song is the follow-up to "Lips of an Angel", the band's biggest hit to date.

== Charts ==
Chart (2006–2007)	Peak position
Canada Rock (Billboard)	4
US Mainstream Rock (Billboard)	6

== Release history ==
Region	Date	Format(s)	Label	Ref.
United States	October 16, 2006	Active rock radio	Universal Republic	
