= The Reign (album) =

Studio album by Hinder
- Released: August 11, 2017
- Recorded: 2016–2017
- Studio: Back-Longue Productions
- Length: 40:07
- Label: The End
- Producers: Cody Hanson; Marshal Dutton

Hinder chronology
| Stripped (2016) | The Reign (2017) | Back to Life (2025) |

Singles from The Reign
- 1. "Remember Me" Released: April 28, 2017; 2. "The Reign" Released: July 14, 2017; 3. "Making It Hard" Released: October 26, 2017; 4. "Another Way Out" Released: January 16, 2018; 5. "King of the Letdown" Released: April 2, 2018; 6. "Long Gone" Released: July 13, 2018

The Reign is the sixth studio album by the American rock band Hinder. It was released August 11, 2017 via The End Records. It is the last album to feature rhythm guitarist Mark King.

== Background and recording ==
After playing a show at the venue "Ziggy's By The Sea" in Wilmington, North Carolina the group did an interview with The Baltimore Sun and talked about the band's place over the course of the past year. The group stated that they had no choice but to find a new lead singer in order to keep the band alive. The band went on to say that the change in singers was a fresh start for both Hinder and Austin John, and that they are searching for another hit song as big as "Lips of an Angel".

Also announced during the interview with the Baltimore Sun the band confirmed the group would release a then-untitled acoustic EP and a full-length studio album with all new original material. The projects were slated to be released in 2016.

On March 7, 2016 the band announced that their upcoming acoustic EP would be titled Stripped and will be released May 13, 2016. The EP will feature six tracks with one newly recorded track titled "Not an Addict" which was originally recorded by K's Choice.

The band went out on tour in support of the new EP on the "Stripped Tour" with new rock band Like a Storm as the opening act. the tour consisted of 22 shows over the course of June through July 2016.

On October 9, 2016 the band posted pictures from the studio on their official Facebook and Instagram accounts, and announced they were in the studio working on their sixth studio album with pianist and songwriter Sarah Thiele.

In mid December 2016, the band shared a picture of singer Marshal Dutton and drummer Cody Hanson with the caption "Just taking a nice break from working on the album in Nicaragua!".

In February 2017, Dutton and Hanson entered the studio with songwriter/producer Sam Brown II to add some finishing touches to the album.

On March 2, 2017 the band announced a summer tour with Nonpoint.

The band released the lead single from their upcoming sixth studio album titled "Remember Me" via Loudwire on April 19, 2017. The single was released April 28, 2017.

== Track listing ==
| No. | Title | Length |
|---|---|---|
| 1. | "The Reign" | 3:12 |
| 2. | "Burn It Down" | 3:37 |
| 3. | "King of the Letdown" | 3:15 |
| 4. | "Remember Me" | 3:15 |
| 5. | "Too Late" | 4:26 |
| 6. | "Another Way Out" | 3:37 |
| 7. | "Making It Hard" | 3:34 |
| 8. | "Drink You Away" | 3:33 |
| 9. | "Play to Win" | 3:45 |
| 10. | "Long Gone" | 3:48 |
| 11. | "Loser's Salute" | 3:57 |

== Charts ==
| Chart (2017) | Peak position |
|---|---|
| US Independent Albums (Billboard) | 18 |
| US Top Current Album Sales (Billboard) | 98 |
