= Without You (Hinder song) =

Single by Hinder

from the album Take It to the Limit
- Released: September 23, 2008
- Recorded: 2008
- Genre: Post-grunge; glam metal
- Length: 3:52
- Label: Universal
- Songwriters: Austin Winkler; Cody Hanson; Brian Howes

Hinder singles chronology
"Use Me" (2008)	"Without You" (2008)	"The Best Is Yet to Come" (2008)

"Without You" is a song by American rock band Hinder, that was the second single released from their second studio album Take It to the Limit (2008). It was released as a digital download on September 23, 2008. A music video was produced for the song, featuring actors Kellan Lutz and Aimee Teegarden. "I play the bad boyfriend," Lutz told MTV. "Aimee is the sweet cheerleader girl ... who shouldn't be with me. I lead her life on the wrong track until she gets rid of me, and her life finally goes to where it should go. She graduates high school, while I am left in the dust."

== Music video ==
A teenage girl (Aimee Teegarden) sees her boyfriend flirting with another girl (actress Kayla Ewell). The girl scowls and turns her head away. Later the girl starts fighting with her boyfriend (Kellan Lutz). He puts his arms up and walks away. The girl's face is red with tears and they seemed to have broken up. The next scene shows the girl in a classroom as papers are being handed out, the girl gets a D− on the paper. The next scene shows the boy as he runs into two jocks, while the girl receives an A+ on a paper. The jocks push him and then he starts fighting with them. A teacher breaks the fight up and sends them to the principal's office. The next scene is the girl is hanging out with two friends and laughing, the girl passes the office and sees her ex sitting in a chair, with the two jocks sitting next to him. She turns her head and walks on. At the end, the girl is at her graduation ceremony, free from her ex, who stands next to his truck and sulks. Meanwhile, Austin John Winker is playing his guitar on the bleachers where he later joins in with the band at night as the stadium lights are on. In the end, Hinder left the stadium and the lights turned off.

== Charts ==
Chart (2008–09)	Peak position
Canada Hot 100 (Billboard)	94
US Billboard Hot 100	85
US Billboard Mainstream Top 40	22
US Billboard Adult Top 40	24
US Billboard Mainstream Rock Tracks	32
