= List of Billboard Mainstream Top 40 number-one songs of 2006 =

This is a list of songs which reached number one on the Billboard Mainstream Top 40 chart in 2006.

During 2006, a total of 15 singles hit number-one on the charts.

== Chart history ==
Issue date	Song	Artist(s)	Ref.
January 7	"Run It!"	Chris Brown	
January 14	"Run It!"	Chris Brown	
January 21	"Run It!"	Chris Brown	
January 28	"Stickwitu"	The Pussycat Dolls	
February 4	"Stickwitu"	The Pussycat Dolls	
February 11	"Check on It"	Beyoncé featuring Slim Thug	
February 18	"Check on It"	Beyoncé featuring Slim Thug	
February 25	"Check on It"	Beyoncé featuring Slim Thug	
March 4	"Check on It"	Beyoncé featuring Slim Thug	
March 11	"Check on It"	Beyoncé featuring Slim Thug	
March 18	"Check on It"	Beyoncé featuring Slim Thug	
March 25	"So Sick"	Ne-Yo	
April 1	"Be Without You"	Mary J. Blige	
April 8	"Be Without You"	Mary J. Blige	
April 15	"Be Without You"	Mary J. Blige	
April 22	"Be Without You"	Mary J. Blige	
April 29	"Temperature"	Sean Paul	
May 6	"Temperature"	Sean Paul	
May 13	"SOS"	Rihanna	
May 20	"Temperature"	Sean Paul	
May 27	"Hips Don't Lie"	Shakira featuring Wyclef Jean	
June 3	"Hips Don't Lie"	Shakira featuring Wyclef Jean	
June 10	"Hips Don't Lie"	Shakira featuring Wyclef Jean	
June 17	"Hips Don't Lie"	Shakira featuring Wyclef Jean	
June 24	"Hips Don't Lie"	Shakira featuring Wyclef Jean	
July 1	"Hips Don't Lie"	Shakira featuring Wyclef Jean	
July 8	"Hips Don't Lie"	Shakira featuring Wyclef Jean	
July 15	"Promiscuous"†	Nelly Furtado featuring Timbaland	
July 22	"Promiscuous"†	Nelly Furtado featuring Timbaland	
July 29	"Promiscuous"†	Nelly Furtado featuring Timbaland	
August 5	"Promiscuous"†	Nelly Furtado featuring Timbaland	
August 12	"Promiscuous"†	Nelly Furtado featuring Timbaland	
August 19	"Promiscuous"†	Nelly Furtado featuring Timbaland	
August 26	"Promiscuous"†	Nelly Furtado featuring Timbaland	
September 2	"Promiscuous"†	Nelly Furtado featuring Timbaland	
September 9	"Buttons"	The Pussycat Dolls featuring Snoop Dogg	
September 16	"Buttons"	The Pussycat Dolls featuring Snoop Dogg	
September 23	"SexyBack"	Justin Timberlake	
September 30	"SexyBack"	Justin Timberlake	
October 7	"SexyBack"	Justin Timberlake	
October 14	"SexyBack"	Justin Timberlake	
October 21	"SexyBack"	Justin Timberlake	
October 28	"Far Away"	Nickelback	
November 4	"Far Away"	Nickelback	
November 11	"Lips of an Angel"	Hinder	
November 18	"Lips of an Angel"	Hinder	
November 25	"Lips of an Angel"	Hinder	
December 2	"My Love"	Justin Timberlake featuring T.I.	
December 9	"My Love"	Justin Timberlake featuring T.I.	
December 16	"My Love"	Justin Timberlake featuring T.I.	
December 23	"My Love"	Justin Timberlake featuring T.I.	
December 30	"Irreplaceable"	Beyoncé	

== See also ==
- 2006 in music
