= Better Than Me (Hinder song) =

2007 single by Hinder

Single by Hinder

from the album Extreme Behavior
- Released: January 29, 2007
- Studio: The Armoury (Vancouver, British Columbia)
- Length: 3:44
- Label: Universal Republic
- Songwriters: Hinder; Brian Howes
- Producer: Brian Howes

Hinder singles chronology
"How Long" (2006)	"Better Than Me" (2007)	"Homecoming Queen" (2007)

"Better Than Me" is a song by the American rock band Hinder. It was released as the fourth single from their debut album Extreme Behavior. This song was ranked number 66 on MTV Asia's list of Top 100 Hits of 2007.

== Critical reception ==
Billboard magazine called the single "smaller and less bombastic, but [as] equally infectious" as "Lips of an Angel".

== Music video ==
The music video for the song starts with the band playing in a dark room, then shows a dysfunctional young couple at their home. The young man buys meth from a drug dealer in a pickup truck. While looking at pictures of him and his girlfriend together, he cracks open a light bulb with a knife, pours the meth into it, and heats it on a stove. After ingesting the meth, he has a violent, painful reaction to it, suffering a seizure and itching all over his body. His girlfriend walks in and begins to confront him. He starts to throw things at her. The lights of the room the band was in are turned on and it is revealed to be a cathedral. The funeral of the young man seen earlier is in progress, and it is clear that he died from an overdose. The girlfriend rushes forward, in tears, to his casket and puts an envelope into his hands after being stopped by her best friend.

A contest was held on YouTube challenging aspiring directors to create their own video for the song with the reward being the video being shown on television as well as an unpaid job as an assistant on the set of the official video. The winner was not shown on television, and most of the entries involved similar subject-matter to the official video, with very few entries not revolving around drug addiction and only a few not ending in suicide by overdose.

== Charts ==
=== Weekly charts ===
Chart (2007)	Peak position
Australia (ARIA)	11
Canada Hot 100 (Billboard)	16
Canada CHR/Top 40 (Billboard)	22
Canada Hot AC (Billboard)	12
Canada Rock (Billboard)	49
New Zealand (Recorded Music NZ)	16
Slovakia Airplay (ČNS IFPI)	70
US Billboard Hot 100	31
US Adult Pop Airplay (Billboard)	10
US Alternative Airplay (Billboard)	37
US Mainstream Rock Airplay (Billboard)	16
US Pop Airplay (Billboard)	14

=== Year-end charts ===
Chart (2007)	Position
Australia (ARIA)	74
US Billboard Hot 100	97
US Adult Top 40 (Billboard)	29

== Release history ==
Region	Date	Format(s)	Label	Ref.
United States	January 29, 2007	Alternative radio	Universal Republic	
United States	February 6, 2007	Contemporary hit radio	Universal Republic	
Australia	June 4, 2007	CD single	Universal	

== Certifications ==
Region	Certification	Certified units/sales
New Zealand (RMNZ)	Gold	15,000^{‡}
^{‡} Sales+streaming figures based on certification alone.
