= Hit the Ground (disambiguation) =

"Hit the Ground" is a 2015 song by Hinder.

Hit the Ground may also refer to:

- "Hit the Ground", a 1988 single by The Darling Buds
- "Hit the Ground", a 2000 single by 6Gig
- "Hit the Ground", a single by October Sky from Hell Isn't My Home, 2007
- "Hit the Ground", a 1996 single by Slowburn
- "Hit the Ground", a song by Zebrahead from Phoenix, 2008
- "Hit the Ground", a song by Skindred from Volume, 2015
- "Hit the Ground", a song by Lizz Wright from Dreaming Wide Awake, 2005
- "Hit the Ground", a song by Loadstar
- "Hit the Ground", a song by Justin Bieber from Purpose, 2015
- "Hit the Ground", a 2026 song by They Might Be Giants from The World Is to Dig
