= Get Stoned =

2005 single by Hinder

Single by Hinder

from the album Extreme Behavior
- Released: July 25, 2005
- Studio: The Armoury (Vancouver, British Columbia)
- Length: 3:38
- Label: Universal
- Songwriters: Hinder; Brian Howes; Joey Moi
- Producer: Brian Howes

Hinder singles chronology
"Get Stoned" (2005)	"Lips of an Angel" (2006)

"Get Stoned" is the debut single by the American rock band Hinder. It was released in July 2005 as the lead single from their debut album Extreme Behavior. It peaked at number 4 on the Billboard Mainstream Rock Tracks chart in the United States.

== Charts ==
=== Weekly charts ===
Weekly chart performance for "Get Stoned"
Chart (2005–2007)	Peak position
Canada Rock Top 30 (Radio & Records)	17
UK Singles (OCC)	138
US Bubbling Under Hot 100 (Billboard)	3
US Alternative Airplay (Billboard)	37
US Mainstream Rock (Billboard)	4

=== Year-end charts ===
Year-end chart performance for "Get Stoned"
Chart (2006)	Position
US Mainstream Rock Songs (Billboard)	19

== Certifications ==
Certifications for "Get Stoned"
Region	Certification	Certified units/sales
United States (RIAA)	Gold	500,000^{^}
^{^} Shipments figures based on certification alone.

== Release history ==
Release dates and formats for "Get Stoned"
Region	Date	Format(s)	Label	Ref.
United States	July 25, 2005	Active rock radio	Universal	
United States	August 22, 2005	Alternative radio	Universal	
