= Pop 100 =

US music airplay chart

The Pop 100 was a songs chart that debuted in February 2005 and was released weekly by Billboard magazine in the United States until its discontinuation in 2009. It ranked songs based on airplay on Mainstream Top 40 radio stations, singles sales and digital downloads.

== History ==
The Pop 100 was conceived by Michael Ellis and was first published in the Billboard issue of February 12, 2005. It was created to focus ‘on the songs with the greatest mainstream appeal, while the Hot 100 will be driven by the songs with the highest song rotations,’ according to Billboard chart editor Geoff Mayfield. In a press release about the new chart, he also noted that ‘the Pop 100’s construction makes sense when you consider the high correlation between the songs receiving the most Top 40 airplay and the best-selling digital tracks.”

The Pop 100 used only Mainstream radio impressions data, derived from the Pop 100 Airplay chart. Its calculation also considered digital and physical sales. When the Pop 100 was first published, the Hot 100 changed its format as well. Digital downloads were incorporated into the equation which tabulates a song's rank on the chart. Prior to this, only radio airplay and physical singles sales were used to determine positions.

=== Pop 100 Airplay ===
The Pop 100 Airplay chart was created alongside the Pop 100. It measured airplay over top 40 radio stations and was the successor to Top 40 Tracks, the Billboard chart that formerly tracked airplay of those stations after the Hot 100 panel was expanded to include a broader range of stations.

Like the Mainstream Top 40, the Pop 100 Airplay also measured airplay of songs on mainstream radio stations playing pop-oriented music, but the Pop 100 Airplay (like the Hot 100 Airplay) measured airplay based on statistical audience impressions, while the Mainstream Top 40 uses the number of total detections (spins).

=== Discontinuation ===
On June 10, 2009, the Pop 100 was discontinued by Billboard: "In place of the chart, which launched in 2005 and more recently had more mirrored the Hot 100 in light of heightened digital sales, the airplay-only plays-based Mainstream Top 40 survey, which began in 1992, will track the progress of songs across U.S. Top 40 radio." Since digital sales have become a bigger factor in the compilation of the Hot 100, the dominance of R&B and hip hop on that chart has reduced, which in large part had rendered the Pop 100 redundant. The Pop 100 continued to be published on billboard.biz until June 26, 2010.

== List of Pop 100 number-one singles ==
This is a complete list of the songs that reached number one on the Pop 100 chart from its inception in February 2005 through it discontinuation in June 2009. Its airplay points were compiled from electronic monitoring of approximately 115 mainstream Top 40 stations by Nielsen Broadcast Data Systems.

The chart debuted in the issue dated February 12, 2005, with the first number one being "1, 2 Step" by Ciara featuring Missy Elliott. The number-one song on the final chart in the issue dated June 27, 2009, was "Boom Boom Pow" by The Black Eyed Peas.

Issue date	Song	Artist(s)	Weeks at No. 1
December 4, 2004	"Over and Over"	Nelly featuring Tim McGraw	8
January 22, 2005	"1, 2 Step"	Ciara featuring Missy Elliott	4
February 19, 2005	"Boulevard of Broken Dreams"	Green Day	5
March 26, 2005	"Since U Been Gone"	Kelly Clarkson	6
May 7, 2005	"Hollaback Girl"	Gwen Stefani	8
July 2, 2005	"Inside Your Heaven"	Carrie Underwood	1
July 9, 2005	"Inside Your Heaven"	Bo Bice	1
July 16, 2005	"We Belong Together"	Mariah Carey	3
August 6, 2005	"Don't Cha"	The Pussycat Dolls featuring Busta Rhymes	7
September 24, 2005	"Gold Digger"	Kanye West featuring Jamie Foxx	10
December 3, 2005	"Run It!"	Chris Brown	7 ↓↑
January 14, 2006	"Photograph"	Nickelback	1
January 28, 2006	"Check on It"	Beyoncé featuring Slim Thug	5
March 4, 2006	"You're Beautiful"	James Blunt	2
March 18, 2006	"So Sick"	Ne-Yo	2
April 1, 2006	"Unwritten"	Natasha Bedingfield	1
April 8, 2006	"Bad Day"	Daniel Powter	6 ↓↑
May 13, 2006	"SOS"	Rihanna	4
June 17, 2006	"Hips Don't Lie"	Shakira featuring Wyclef Jean	2
July 1, 2006	"Do I Make You Proud"	Taylor Hicks	1
July 8, 2006	"Promiscuous"	Nelly Furtado featuring Timbaland	7
August 26, 2006	"London Bridge"	Fergie	2
September 9, 2006	"SexyBack"	Justin Timberlake	8
November 4, 2006	"Lips of an Angel"	Hinder	1
November 11, 2006	"My Love"	Justin Timberlake featuring T.I.	3
December 2, 2006	"I Wanna Love You"	Akon featuring Snoop Dogg	1
December 9, 2006	"Smack That"	Akon featuring Eminem	1
December 16, 2006	"Irreplaceable"	Beyoncé	6 ↓↑
January 13, 2007	"Fergalicious"	Fergie	1
February 3, 2007	"This Ain't a Scene, It's an Arms Race"	Fall Out Boy	1
February 10, 2007	"Say It Right"	Nelly Furtado	3
March 3, 2007	"What Goes Around...Comes Around"	Justin Timberlake	3
March 24, 2007	"Glamorous"	Fergie featuring Ludacris	3
April 14, 2007	"The Sweet Escape"	Gwen Stefani featuring Akon	1
April 21, 2007	"Give It to Me"	Timbaland featuring Nelly Furtado and Justin Timberlake	2
May 5, 2007	"Girlfriend"	Avril Lavigne	1
May 12, 2007	"Makes Me Wonder"	Maroon 5	4
June 9, 2007	"Umbrella"	Rihanna featuring Jay-Z	6
July 21, 2007	"Big Girls Don't Cry"	Fergie	3 ↓↑
August 4, 2007	"Hey There Delilah"	Plain White T's	1
August 11, 2007	"Beautiful Girls"	Sean Kingston	3
September 8, 2007	"The Way I Are"	Timbaland featuring Keri Hilson	3
September 29, 2007	"Stronger"	Kanye West	5
November 3, 2007	"Apologize"	Timbaland featuring OneRepublic	8 ↓↑
December 1, 2007	"No One"	Alicia Keys	1
January 5, 2008	"Low"	Flo Rida featuring T-Pain	12
March 29, 2008	"Love Song"	Sara Bareilles	1
April 5, 2008	"Bleeding Love"	Leona Lewis	12 ↓↑
April 12, 2008	"Touch My Body"	Mariah Carey	1
July 5, 2008	"I Kissed a Girl"	Katy Perry	7
August 23, 2008	"Forever"	Chris Brown	3 ↓↑
September 6, 2008	"Disturbia"	Rihanna	5 ↓↑
October 18, 2008	"So What"	Pink	5
November 22, 2008	"Hot n Cold"	Katy Perry	2
December 6, 2008	"Live Your Life"	T.I. featuring Rihanna	5
January 10, 2009	"Just Dance"	Lady Gaga featuring Colby O'Donis	6
February 21, 2009	"Crack a Bottle"	Eminem, Dr. Dre and 50 Cent	1
February 28, 2009	"Right Round"	Flo Rida	7
April 18, 2009	"Boom Boom Pow"	The Black Eyed Peas	9 ↓↑
April 25, 2009	"Poker Face"	Lady Gaga	2

- ↓↑ - indicates song's run at number one was non-consecutive
