= When the Smoke Clears =

Studio album by Hinder
- Released: May 12, 2015
- Recorded: 2014
- Genre: Hard rock; post-grunge
- Length: 34:40
- Label: The End
- Producer: Cody Hanson; Marshal Dutton

Hinder chronology
Welcome to the Freakshow (2012)	When the Smoke Clears (2015)	Stripped (2016)

Singles from When the Smoke Clears
- 1. "Hit the Ground" Released: November 24, 2014; 2. "Intoxicated" Released: May 3, 2015

Professional ratings
Review scores
Source	Rating
aNewRisingMusic	4/5 stars

When the Smoke Clears is the fifth studio album by American rock band Hinder. The album was released on May 12, 2015, by their new label The End Records and is their first album to feature lead vocalist Marshal Dutton.

== Production ==
After news broke that Austin Winkler left the band in November 2013 Hinder was extremely inactive on social media and their website. The group stayed silent until July 8, 2014, when they posted a video on Facebook apologizing for their inactivity and announced that they had been writing songs for a new album while they searched for a new lead singer. The band played a string of shows throughout the late summer of 2014 with Nolan Neal as vocalist. The first single off the then-untitled fifth album, titled "Hit the Ground," was released on November 24, 2014. On January 20, 2015, Hinder officially announced that Marshal Dutton, who had written and produced music with Hinder since 2009, was their new vocalist. The other members of Hinder said that Nolan Neal's voice was "too country" for the band's rock image. After the addition of Dutton, the band released a rerecorded version of "Hit The Ground" with Dutton on vocals.

== Release ==
Hinder held an online competition on their social media sites for their fans to help name the new album. On December 9, 2014, the band announced that When the Smoke Clears had been chosen as the album's title, which would be released in the spring of 2015. To help promote the album the band started a Pledge Music campaign.

On March 17, 2015, the band released the song "Rather Hate Than Hurt" via Loudwire, making it the second song to be released from the band since Winkler's departure. The band also revealed the release date of the album to be May 12, 2015.

"Intoxicated" was released on May 5, 2015 as the album's third and final single.

== Track listing ==
No.	Title	Writer(s)	Length
1.	"Rather Hate Than Hurt"	Marshal Dutton; Cody Hanson; Nolan Neal	3:36
2.	"Hit the Ground"	Dutton; Hanson; Matt McGinn; Corey Crowder	3:29
3.	"Wasted Life"	Dutton; Hanson; Westin Davis; Erik Dylan	3:11
4.	"If Only for Tonight"	Dutton; Hanson; Justin Richards	3:37
5.	"Intoxicated"	Dutton; Hanson; Ryan Hurd; Joey Hyde	2:55
6.	"Dead to Me" (Faktion cover)	Dutton; Vencent Hickerson; Brandon Tant	3:56
7.	"Foolish Eyes"	Dutton; Hanson	3:26
8.	"Nothing Left to Lose" (Nine Left Dead cover)	Dutton; Hanson	3:47
9.	"Letting Go"	Dutton; Hanson; Neal	3:22
10.	"I Need Another Drink"	Dutton; Hanson	3:20
Total length:			34:40

F.Y.E. exclusive two extra acoustic tracks
No.	Title	Length
11.	"Hit the Ground" (acoustic)	3:15
12.	"Get Stoned" (acoustic)	3:46

== Personnel ==
- Marshal Dutton – lead vocals, guitar, producer
- Cody Hanson – drums, producer, backing vocals
- Joe "Blower" Garvey – lead guitar, backing vocals
- Mark King – rhythm guitar, backing vocals
- Mike Rodden – bass guitar, backing vocals

== Charts ==
Chart (2015)	Peak position
US Billboard 200	75
US Top Alternative Albums (Billboard)	8
US Top Hard Rock Albums (Billboard)	3
US Top Rock Albums (Billboard)	10
