= Lips of an Angel =

2006 single by Hinder

Single by Hinder

from the album Extreme Behavior
- Released: April 3, 2006
- Studio: The Armoury (Vancouver, British Columbia)
- Genre: Post-grunge
- Length: 4:21
- Label: Universal Republic
- Songwriters: Hinder; Brian Howes
- Producer: Brian Howes

Hinder singles chronology
"Get Stoned" (2005)	"Lips of an Angel" (2006)	"How Long" (2006)

Music video
- "Lips of an Angel" on YouTube

"Lips of an Angel" is a song by American rock band Hinder, co-written by the band and Brian Howes, who also produced the track. It was released in April 2006 as the second single from their 2005 debut album, Extreme Behavior. The power ballad was their breakthrough hit, reaching number three on the US Billboard Hot 100 chart and peaking at number one in both Australia and New Zealand. It has sold 3.6 million copies in the US as of January 2015, making it one of the most downloaded rock songs. In 2024, the staff of Consequence included the song in their list of "50 Kick-Butt Post-Grunge Songs We Can Get Behind".

Country music artist Jack Ingram released a cover of the song in 2006 that peaked at number 16 on the Billboard Hot Country Songs chart and number 77 on the Billboard Hot 100. In 2013, the former lead-singer of Hinder, Austin John Winkler, collaborated with country music artist Shaylen to release a reimagined version of the song. Sung as a duet, the second verse replaces the original's from the female perspective.

== Lyrics ==
The lyrics deal with the singer describing his feelings when his favored girlfriend from his past calls late at night, somewhat pleasantly interrupting his current relationship. More than once, a reference to the call being secret is made, and the singer expresses concern of a fight ensuing as a result. The song concludes just as it began, with the singer questioning to why she is calling so late. However, at the end, it is less literal and more figurative, with the underlying meaning of "so late" not at night, but too late in life, adding an element of gravitas to the song, as it ends with the plot unresolved.

Drummer Cody Hanson said the lyrics were based on an experience singer Austin John Winkler had:

He came over to the house and we were writing, and I had the slow guitar progression. He had just finished telling me the story about what happened and then we sat down to write. He just kind of belted out, 'Honey, why you calling me so late?' and we just kind of stopped and had this moment. We're like 'Oh, my God, that's what we have to write the song about.' And so we just sort of whipped it out real quick. We didn't work on it very long. It took maybe 20 or 30 minutes and the song was done.

== Chart performance ==
The song experienced the most success in Australia. On the chart date of February 4, 2007, the song debuted atop Australia's ARIA Singles Chart, replacing Evermore's "Light Surrounding You" and keeping the peak position for seven weeks before being replaced by "Straight Lines" by Silverchair. On February 12, it reached the top spot on New Zealand's RIANZ Singles Chart and stayed there for one more week before being dethroned by "This Ain't a Scene, It's an Arms Race" by Fall Out Boy. In the United States, the song reached number one on the Billboard Pop 100 and Mainstream Top 40 charts, and number three on the Billboard Hot 100 and Mainstream Rock Tracks charts, in November 2006. It was also their only top-10 single on the Modern Rock Tracks chart, reaching number eight. Elsewhere, the song had limited chart success and remains Hinder's only hit in most countries in which it charted.

== Music video ==
The music video for "Lips of an Angel" was directed by Nigel Dick and largely follows the narrative of the song's lyrics, focusing on a late night phone call between the raconteur (Austin John Winkler) and his former lover (Emmanuelle Chriqui).

== Formats and track listings ==
Digital download

1. "Lips of an Angel" – 4:21

CD single

1. "Lips of an Angel" – 4:21
2. "By the Way" (acoustic) – 3:34
3. "Bliss (I Don't Know Why)" (acoustic) – 3:45
4. Video

== Charts ==
=== Weekly charts ===
Weekly chart performance for "Lips of an Angel"
Chart (2006–2008)	Peak position
Australia (ARIA)	1
Austria (Ö3 Austria Top 40)	62
Canada (Nielsen SoundScan)	2
Canada AC (Billboard)	38
Canada CHR/Top 40 (Billboard)	3
Canada Hot AC (Billboard)	1
Canada Rock (Billboard)	4
France Radio (SNEP)	83
Netherlands (Single Top 100)	98
Netherlands (Dutch Top 40 Tipparade)	4
New Zealand (Recorded Music NZ)	1
Slovakia Airplay (ČNS IFPI)	48
US Billboard Hot 100	3
US Adult Contemporary (Billboard)	18
US Adult Pop Airplay (Billboard)	3
US Alternative Airplay (Billboard)	8
US Mainstream Rock Airplay (Billboard)	3
US Pop Airplay (Billboard)	1

=== Year-end charts ===
2006 year-end chart performance for "Lips of an Angel"
Chart (2006)	Position
US Billboard Hot 100	30
US Adult Top 40 (Billboard)	33
US Mainstream Rock Songs (Billboard)	10

2007 year-end chart performance for "Lips of an Angel"
Chart (2007)	Position
Australia (ARIA)	5
New Zealand (RIANZ)	18
US Billboard Hot 100	46
US Adult Top 40 (Billboard)	18

=== Decade-end charts ===
Decade-end chart performance for "Lips of an Angel"
Chart (2000–2009)	Position
US Mainstream Top 40 (Billboard)	42

== Certifications ==
Certifications for "Lips of an Angel"
Region	Certification	Certified units/sales
Australia (ARIA)	Platinum	70,000^{^}
New Zealand (RMNZ)	3× Platinum	90,000^{‡}
United Kingdom (BPI)	Silver	200,000^{‡}
United States (RIAA)	4× Platinum	4,000,000^{‡}
Ringtone / Mastertone
Canada (Music Canada)	4× Platinum	160,000^{*}
United States (RIAA)	3× Platinum	3,000,000^{*}
^{*} Sales figures based on certification alone.^{^} Shipments figures based on certification alone.^{‡} Sales+streaming figures based on certification alone.

== Release history ==
Release dates and formats for "Lips of an Angel"
Region	Date	Format	Label	Ref.
United States	April 3, 2006	Active rock radio	Universal Republic	
United States	June 19, 2006	Alternative radio	Universal Republic	
United States	July 24, 2006	Contemporary hit radio	Universal Republic	
United States	August 7, 2006	Hot adult contemporary radio	Universal Republic	
Australia	January 22, 2007	CD single	Universal Republic	

== Jack Ingram version ==
"Lips of an Angel"

Single by Jack Ingram

from the album This Is It
- Released: December 11, 2006
- Genre: Country
- Length: 3:45
- Label: Big Machine
- Songwriters: Austin John Winkler; Cody Hanson; Brian Howes
- Producer: Jeremy Stover

Jack Ingram singles chronology
"Love You" (2006)	"Lips of an Angel" (2006)	"Measure of a Man" (2007)

Music video
- "Lips of an Angel" on YouTube

Country music artist Jack Ingram released a version of the song in December 2006. Ingram's version, the lead-off single to his 2007 album This Is It. His cover reached a peak of number 16 on the Billboard Hot Country Songs chart in April 2007. Ingram's version does not include the last stanza where the singer once again asks why she is calling so late.

=== Background ===
Regarding his cover of this song, Ingram gave an explanation in the liner notes of This Is It:

"I heard this song on the radio. I think it's a killer song. I thought we could give it another feel and do it justice. A good song is a good song. I'll let other people choose sides between what genre is what genre and who should stay inside which box. I think there are two kinds of music: good and bad. I try to stay on the right side. Besides, who hasn't felt this way at some point in their life? Don't lie."

=== Charts ===
Weekly chart performance for "Lips of an Angel"
Chart (2006–2007)	Peak position
US Billboard Hot 100	77
US Hot Country Songs (Billboard)	16
US Pop 100 (Billboard)	87

== In popular culture ==
On June 12, 2020, the Canadian Blink-182 podcast 'Blink-155' released a compilation, consisting of 65 covers of "Lips of an Angel", recorded by the members of the Blink-155 fan base (known as the 'Nation' or 'Naysh') as well as the hosts of the podcast, Sam Sutherland & Josiah Hughes. The compilation is titled "It's Really Good to Hear Your Voice", in reference to one of the lyrics of the song. The compilation was mastered by Dan Birch and the artwork was done by Kyle Mabson. All proceeds from the compilation get donated to charities related to the Black Lives Matter movement. Hinder drummer Cody Hanson said of the compilation, "Whether people are making fun of it or not, I think it's awesome either way."

== See also ==
- List of number-one singles of 2007 (Australia)
- List of number-one singles from the 2000s (New Zealand)
- List of Billboard Mainstream Top 40 number-one songs of 2006
