= Revolution (Skillet album) =

Studio album by Skillet
- Released: November 1, 2024
- Studios: Full Circle Music, Nashville; Van Howes Studio, Vancouver
- Genre: Hard rock
- Length: 35:01
- Label: Hear It Loud
- Producers: Brian Howes; Seth Mosley; Korey Cooper; Youthyear; Carlo Colasacco

Skillet chronology
Dominion (2022)	Revolution (2024)	After the Storm (2026)

Singles from Revolution
- 1. "Unpopular" Released: August 9, 2024; 2. "All That Matters" Released: September 12, 2024; 3. "Ash In the Wind" Released: October 18, 2024

Revolution is the twelfth studio album by American Christian rock band Skillet. It was released on November 1, 2024, through the band's label Hear It Loud Records. It is the first Skillet album to be released independently.

Regarding the title and theme, Skillet frontman John Cooper explained, "The revolution we're talking about on this record is not a political revolution, [and] it is certainly not a militaristic one, which I've never supported. It's a revolution for love. It's a revolution to love your enemies". (Note: On "love your enemies", see Matthew 5:43–48 and Luke 6:27–36.) On the album cover, the band flag Cooper holds has "1 COR 13:13" printed in the lower-right corner, referring to the First Letter of Paul to the Corinthians. The verse reads, "But now faith, hope, love, abide these three; but the greatest of these is love." (NASB1995) At slightly over 35 minutes, Revolution is the band's shortest album to date.

== Singles ==
The first single for the album, "Unpopular", was released with an accompanying music video on August 9, 2024. Designed with "tongue-in-cheek" lyrics, Cooper stated the song is "saying the world's gone so nuts that the things the world loves are so disgusting and so crazy—like, in a world gone mad, would you really want to be popular? That's kind of the joke of the song."

The third and last for the album, "Ash in the Wind", was released on October 18, 2024. Cooper mentioned that "'Ash in the Wind' reminds us of a mix of old Skillet and Linkin Park, which I’m a huge fan of. Korey produced it, and it definitely merges live performance with modern recording techniques."

== Critical reception ==
Professional ratings
Review scores
Source	Rating
AllMusic	3/5 stars
Jesusfreakhideout.com	2/5 stars 2.5/5 stars
Blabbermouth.net	8/10

The album received mixed reviews from critics. Alex Caldwell at Jesus Freak Hideout rated the album 2 out of 5 stars and said: "Revolution finds the group treading water musically and thematically at best and pandering to an unknown demographic at worst with a few questionable theological lyrics and pseudo-political ramblings that (at times) sound just generic enough to be considered revolutionary by any side that wants to claim them." Anne Erickson at Blabbermouth.net rated the album 8 out of 10 and stated: "Skillet certainly keep with their usual formula on Revolution, but the album still has a new life and should be exactly what fans want in a new Skillet set."

== Track listing ==
All tracks are written by John, Korey Cooper and Seth Mosley except where noted.

Revolution track listing
No.	Title	Writer(s)	Length
1.	"Showtime"		3:34
2.	"Unpopular"		3:05
3.	"All That Matters"	John Cooper, Brian Howes	3:28
4.	"Not Afraid"	John Cooper, Korey Cooper	3:14
5.	"Revolution"	John Cooper, Korey Cooper, Youthyear, Carlo Colasacco	3:06
6.	"Ash in the Wind"	John Cooper, Korey Cooper	3:52
7.	"Fire Inside of Me"	John Cooper, Korey Cooper	3:53
8.	"Defector"		3:20
9.	"Happy Wedding Day (Alex's Song)"	John Cooper	3:58
10.	"Death Defier"		3:38
Total length:			35:01

== Personnel ==
Skillet

- John Cooper – lead vocals, bass, acoustic guitar
- Korey Cooper – rhythm guitar, keyboards, programming, string arranger, synthesizer
- Seth Morrison – lead guitar
- Jen Ledger – drums, vocals, backing vocals

Additional personnel

- Seth Mosley – additional guitar, additional vocals, keyboards, programming (1, 2, 8, 9, 10)
- Chris Marvin – additional vocals (1, 5, 6, 10)
- Brian Howes – additional vocals, additional guitar (3, 4, 7)
- Youthyear – keyboards, programming (5)
- Carlo Colasacco – additional keyboards, programming (5)
- Cara Fox – cello (9)
- Eleanore Denis – violin (9)
- Robin Diaz – percussion, additional vocals (3, 4, 7)

Production

- Brian Howes – production (3, 4, 7)
- Seth Mosley – production, audio engineer (1, 2, 8, 9, 10)
- Korey Cooper – production, audio engineer (6, 9)
- Youthyear – production, audio engineer (5)
- Carlo Colasacco – production, audio engineer (5)
- Chris Lord-Alge – mixing (3, 4, 7)
- Neal Avron – mixing (1, 2, 8, 9, 10)
- Scott Skrzynski – assistant mixing (1, 2, 8, 9, 10)
- Nick Radovanovic – mixing, audio engineer (6), digital editing (all tracks except; 3, 4, 7)
- Ted Jensen – mastering
- Steven Servi – digital editing (all tracks except; 3, 4, 7)
- Ethan Radtke – audio engineer (6)
- Grayson Smith –assistant mixing (3, 4, 7)
- Karl Dicaire – audio engineer, digital editing (3, 4, 7)
- Brian Judd – assistant mixing (3, 4, 7)

== Charts ==
Chart performance for Revolution
Chart (2024)	Peak position
Swiss Albums (Schweizer Hitparade)	72
UK Album Downloads (Official Charts)	22
UK Independent Albums (Official Charts)	39
UK Rock & Metal Albums (Official Charts)	12
US Billboard 200	100
US Top Christian Albums (Billboard)	1
US Top Rock & Alternative Albums (Billboard)	19
