= Hit the Ground =

Single by Hinder

from the album When the Smoke Clears
- Released: November 24, 2014
- Recorded: 2014
- Length: 3:29
- Label: The End
- Songwriters: Corey Crowder; Marshal Dutton; Cody Hanson; Nolan Neal; Matt McGinn
- Producers: Marshal Dutton, Cody Hanson

Hinder singles chronology
"Talk to Me" (2013)	"Hit the Ground" (2014)	"Intoxicated" (2015)

"Hit the Ground" is a single by American rock band Hinder from their album When the Smoke Clears. It was released on November 24, 2014, by The End Records. The song debuted on the Active Rock chart at No. 34.

== Background and release ==
On November 21, 2014, Hinder officially announced their new single titled "Hit the Ground" would be released on November 24, 2014, with singer-songwriter Nolan Neal as their new vocalist. This was the first official release from the band after former lead singer and founding member Austin John Winkler left the band in November 2013.

== Charts ==
Chart (2015)	Peak position
US Mainstream Rock (Billboard)	34
