= All American Nightmare =

Studio album by Hinder
- Released: December 7, 2010
- Recorded: 2010
- Studio: Barcode Studios (Oklahoma); The Hideout (Las Vegas, NV)
- Genre: Hard rock; post-grunge
- Length: 36:59
- Label: Universal Republic
- Producer: Cody Hanson; Kevin Churko; Marshal Dutton

Hinder chronology
| Take It to the Limit (2008) | All American Nightmare (2010) | Welcome to the Freakshow (2012) |

Singles from All American Nightmare
- 1. "All American Nightmare" Released: September 14, 2010; 2. "What Ya Gonna Do" Released: May 17, 2011; 3. "The Life" Released: October 11, 2011; 4. "Red Tail Lights" Released: January 29, 2012

All American Nightmare is the third studio album by American rock band Hinder. It was released on December 7, 2010 via Universal Republic Records. The album is significantly heavier in sound than either of the band's previous two records, 2008's Take It to the Limit and 2005's Extreme Behavior.

The album sold 35,000 copies during its first week on sale in the United States, and debuted at number 37 on the Billboard 200 albums chart.

== Production ==
Hinder began recording the album in early 2010 with producer Kevin Churko. The band had originally selected Howard Benson to produce the album, but Churko was later hired for the role. According to singer Austin John Winkler, he and drummer Cody Hanson wrote around 60 songs for the album, of which 10 were recorded for the standard release, and an additional two which are on the deluxe version of the album. The writing process was different from what the band had done in the past; Winkler said that "We normally do whatever the label wants. But for this record, we had to do something different. We had to mix it up a little bit".

The album was recorded in two parts; all music was recorded at Hanson's personal studio, while vocals, performed by Winkler, were recorded at his studio in Las Vegas.

Winkler said that he was pleased with the album, saying that "I'm ecstatic about the album...I've never been more proud of a record than I have with this one".

"I kinda went at it with the approach that I am a little hungrier, and took a more personal approach", Winkler told Alternative Addiction in a 2010 interview, "We went a little darker and a little heavier with this record, it's a little more real".

== Songs ==
Winkler said that the band had intentionally modified the sound of the music on the album, intending for it to sound like "Southern rock with a twist, but still heavy". He said further that many of the songs on the album are dissimilar to one another, with "some unique songs on there". According to a writer from The Vindicator, the songs ranged from "the rocking title track, the album's lead single, as well as the popish 'Hey Ho' and the ballad 'What Ya Gonna Do'".

In addition to Winkler and Hanson, the band asked other musicians to be involved with the writing of several songs. Winkler said that "We went around and wrote with anybody we could think of, just to see what would happen and to get a different vibe. We knew we needed a different flavor and some different influences in there".

The song "Waking Up the Devil" was released on the Saw 3D soundtrack in October 2010.

== Release ==
While early reports said only that the album was to come out in the second half of 2010, and it was subsequently scheduled to be released on December 14, the album was then released on December 7.

The title track of the album was released as the first single from the album on September 14, 2010, and made available for digital download on October 5.

The band released music videos for two songs, "All American Nightmare" and "What Ya Gonna Do".

The album's cover art was released on November 3, 2010, featuring model Jesse Lee Denning on the cover, who also appeared in the music video for "All American Nightmare". Jesse Lee Denning is a tattoo/fashion model and is dating former From Autumn to Ashes guitarist and songwriter Brian Deneeve. The band has been quoted as jokingly saying that all anyone talks about is Jesse Lee as opposed to their songs.

It was announced on October 10, 2011 that "The Life" would be released as the album's third single.

== Critical reception ==
Professional ratings
Review scores
| Source | Rating |
|---|---|
| AllMusic | 1.5/5 stars |
| Billboard | 3/5 stars |
| Classic Rock | 8/10 |
| Sputnikmusic | 1/5 |

Initial reactions to the album were mostly positive. AllMusic's Stephen Thomas Erlewine called the album "resolutely a re-creation of rock & roll past", and gave it a rating of one and a half stars out of five. In a favourable review, Hard Rock Haven said the album "stands out" among other modern rock albums, and gave it an eight out of ten rating.

== Track listing ==
All tracks are written by Austin John Winkler, Cody Hanson, Brad Warren and Brett Warren, except where noted:

| No. | Title | Writer(s) | Length |
|---|---|---|---|
| 1. | "2 Sides of Me" | | 3:26 |
| 2. | "All American Nightmare" | Austin John Winkler; Cody Hanson; The Warren Brothers; Marshal Dutton; Kevin Churko | 3:18 |
| 3. | "What Ya Gonna Do" | | 4:08 |
| 4. | "Hey Ho" | Austin John Winkler; Cody Hanson; The Warren Brothers; Marshal Dutton; Kevin Churko | 3:37 |
| 5. | "The Life" | | 3:39 |
| 6. | "Waking Up the Devil" | | 4:14 |
| 7. | "Red Tail Lights" | Austin John Winkler; Cody Hanson; Jeffrey Steele | 3:49 |
| 8. | "Striptease" | | 3:30 |
| 9. | "Everybody's Wrong" | | 3:42 |
| 10. | "Put That Record On" | | 3:39 |
| Total length: | | | 36:59 |

Deluxe edition
| No. | Title | Length |
|---|---|---|
| 11. | "Good Life" | 3:35 |
| 12. | "Bad Mutha Fucka" | 3:35 |
| 13. | "Put That Record On" (demo version) | 3:43 |
| 14. | "What Ya Gonna Do" (demo version) | 4:14 |
| 15. | "2 Sides of Me" (demo version – iTunes exclusive) | 3:16 |
| 16. | "All American Nightmare" (music video) | 4:04 |

== Personnel ==
- Austin John Winkler — lead vocals
- Mark King — rhythm guitar, piano, backing vocals
- Joe "Blower" Garvey — lead guitar, backing vocals
- Mike Rodden — bass guitar, backing vocals
- Cody Hanson — producer, drums, mixing, backing vocals
- Marshal Dutton — additional vocals, additional guitar, additional keyboards, producer
- Mike Norman — organ
- Kevin Churko — producer, programming, engineering, mixing
- Kane Churko — programming, engineering assistant, digital editing
- Bob Ludwig — mastering
- Bruce McPeters — front cover art
- Philippe Rohdewald — photography
- Pamela Littky — photography
- Todd Cayce — front cover design concept
- Jon Minson — logo design

== Charts ==
=== Weekly charts ===
| Chart (2010) | Peak position |
|---|---|
| Canadian Albums (Nielsen SoundScan) | 77 |
| US Billboard 200 | 37 |
| US Top Alternative Albums (Billboard) | 1 |
| US Top Hard Rock Albums (Billboard) | 2 |
| US Top Rock Albums (Billboard) | 3 |

=== Year-end charts ===
| Chart (2011) | Position |
|---|---|
| US Top Rock Albums (Billboard) | 49 |
