= Closure (band) =

Canadian alternative rock band

- Origin: Vancouver, British Columbia, Canada
- Genres: Alternative rock
- Years active: 2002–2006
- Labels: TVT Records (2003 - 2006)
- Members: Brian Howes; Brian Jennings; Axel Gimenez; Robin Diaz

Closure was a Canadian alternative rock band.

== History ==
Closure formed in 2002 in Vancouver, British Columbia and previously signed to TVT Records. The band released their first album, a self-titled album, in 2003. The album received mediocre reviews. The album produced one single and music video "Look Out Below". "Look Out Below" was included in the 2003 film Darkness Falls, courtesy of TVT Records.

The band started a MySpace page and recorded a few tracks privately. The group disbanded in 2006 after being dropped from their label; lead singer Brian Howes, moved on to become an award-winning producer.

== Album ==
Closure

Studio album by Closure
- Released: June 17, 2003
- Genre: Alternative rock
- Label: TVT Records

- Closure (2003)
  1. "Look Out Below"
  2. "Afterglow"
  3. "Oxygen"
  4. "What it's All About"
  5. "Whatever Made You"
  6. "Crushed
  7. "Lie to Me"
  8. "Live Again"
  9. "I Don't Mind (The Rain)"
  10. "Fragile"
  11. "You Are My Hatred"

== Members ==
- Brian Howes - lead vocals, guitar
- Axel Gimenez - guitar
- Brian Jennings - bass, backup vocals
- Robin Diaz - drums
