= Take It to the Limit (Hinder album) =

Studio album by Hinder
- Released: November 4, 2008
- Recorded: 2006–2008
- Studios: Portable Tour Bus Studio (Vancouver, British Columbia)
- Genre: Rock
- Length: 41:16
- Label: Universal Republic
- Producer: Brian Howes

Hinder chronology
| Extreme Behavior (2005) | Take It to the Limit (2008) | All American Nightmare (2010) |

Singles from Take It to the Limit
- 1. "Use Me" Released: July 15, 2008; 2. "Without You" Released: September 23, 2008; 3. "The Best Is Yet to Come" Released: November 4, 2008; 4. "Up All Night" Released: February 3, 2009; 5. "Loaded and Alone" Released: July 2009

Take It to the Limit is the second studio album by American rock band Hinder, released November 4, 2008 on Universal Republic Records. The album was recorded by Jay Van Poederooyen and produced by Brian Howes at Van Howes Studios in Vancouver, British Columbia, Canada. The record was mixed by Chris Lord-Alge at Mix LA in Tarzana, California, United States. It has a much heavier glam metal and a lesser post-grunge influence than their last album, while retaining the elements of hard rock that the band had previously used. The album has been certified Gold by the RIAA.

== Release ==
The first single, "Use Me", was released to radio on July 7, 2008, with a digital download release on July 15, 2008. The album debuted at number four on the Billboard Hot 200, selling 81,000 copies in its first week. "Heaven Sent" was performed at Hinder concerts dating back to 2007; however, the song was originally called "Heaven Lost You" when it was first performed.

== Background ==
"We're anxious to get in and get started," frontman Austin John Winkler tells Billboard.com. He says that the group has "probably three or four songs that we have prepared that we could play live at this point. Everything else is just ideas. We have a little rehearsal studio we set up (backstage) every day, and we're working on new material. It's all coming along real well."

Hinder started playing at least two new songs at each show, one in a full-band version and another in a stripped-down, acoustic arrangement in their 2007 tours. Winkler says that the then untitled album, which would succeed 2005's double platinum Extreme Behavior is not yet going in any particular direction, however.

"If you listen to 'Extreme Behavior,' it's so diverse. Not one song sounds like the other," Winkler explains. "We want it to be like that again. We write what we think are good songs, and you'll definitely hear some experiences of the last two years on the road."

Winkler says that Hinder plans to work again with "Extreme Behavior" producer Brian Howes ("You gotta go with what works, and we work very, very well together") and probably record half of the album in Los Angeles and the rest in Vancouver, with a hoped-for summer or fourth-quarter release.

"There's always a little bit of pressure there," Winkler says, "but I actually believe we've got a way better start on this record because we've grown so much as songwriters and learned a whole lot more."

== Reception ==
Professional ratings
Review scores
| Source | Rating |
|---|---|
| AllMusic | 1.5/5 stars |
| Entertainment Weekly | (C+) |
| Rolling Stone | 2.5/5 stars |

Although critical reactions to the album have been mixed, it was received better than their debut. It received a 49/100 score on Metacritic. Entertainment Weekly gave a grade of C+ and cited their lack of originality and contrasting song styles of hard rock and ballads. Chris Willman explained, "If you were ever young and in love, dumb with drink, and had a head swimming with not just Boone's Farm wine but also Def Leppard, Bon Jovi, and AC/DC (to name these guys' most blatant anthemic influences), you may be willing to forgive Hinder's lack of originality and preponderance of madonna/whore issues." He summed up by saying "If only the whiplash they induce resulted from real headbanging, not from trying to follow Hinder's song-to-song indecision about whether to be studs or wimps." In a more positive review Hard Rock Hideout gave it 4.5 out of five stars saying that "Take It To The Limit is a stronger album from start to finish than the band's debut, and Hinder is one of the bands leading the revival for straight up rock-n-roll and “Take It To The Limit” is going to go a long way in helping the cause."

Many have criticized the originality of the album, saying many of the lyrical themes were similar to many snap music rap albums (especially the Dem Franchize Boyz album On Top Of Our Game), and the sound was similar to many 1980s glam metal bands.

== Track listing ==
All songs written by Austin Winkler, Cody Hanson and Brian Howes.

| No. | Title | Length |
|---|---|---|
| 1. | "Use Me" | 3:49 |
| 2. | "Loaded and Alone" | 4:06 |
| 3. | "Last Kiss Goodbye" | 3:48 |
| 4. | "Up All Night" (featuring Crispin Earl and Eric Schraeder of the Veer Union) | 3:33 |
| 5. | "Without You" | 3:52 |
| 6. | "Take It to the Limit" (featuring Mick Mars of Mötley Crüe) | 3:11 |
| 7. | "The Best Is Yet to Come" | 3:22 |
| 8. | "Heaven Sent" | 3:41 |
| 9. | "Thing for You" | 3:59 |
| 10. | "Lost in the Sun" | 3:52 |
| 11. | "Far from Home" | 4:03 |

== Bonus tracks ==
Best Buy have released a version that include six exclusive bonus tracks, featuring live and in-studio acoustic versions of these songs.

- "Heaven Sent (Live)" – 3:42
- "Loaded and Alone (Acoustic)" – 3:34
- "Lost in the Sun (Live)" – 3:46
- "The Best Is Yet to Come (Acoustic)" – 3:21
- "Without You (Acoustic)" – 3:52
- "Use Me (Live)" – 4:30

Wal-Mart have also released a special edition of the album which that includes three bonus tracks and a bonus DVD.

- "Thunderstruck" (AC/DC cover) – 4:52
- "Live for Today" – 2:56
- "Running in the Rain" (Extreme Behavior outtake) – 3:35

iTunes U.S. has two bonus tracks.

- "Heartless" – 3:38
- "One Night Stand" – 3:14

iTunes U.K. has two bonus tracks.

- "Heartless" – 3:38
- "Thunderstruck" (AC/DC cover) – 4:52

Japanese edition has two bonus tracks.

- "One Night Stand" – 3:14
- "Running in the Rain" (Extreme Behavior outtake) – 3:35

== Personnel ==
- Austin John Winkler – lead vocals
- Joe "Blower" Garvey – lead guitar, backing vocals
- Mark King – rhythm guitar, piano, backing vocals
- Mike Rodden – bass guitar, backing vocals
- Cody Hanson – drums
- Mick Mars – guest guitar (Take It to the Limit title track only)
- Paul Laine – backing vocals
- Brian Howes – producer, additional keyboards, guitars and backing vocals
- Chris Lord-Alge – mixing
- Ted Jensen – engineer, mastering

== Chart positions ==
=== Weekly charts ===
Weekly chart performance for Take It to the Limit
| Chart (2008) | Peak position |
|---|---|
| Australian Albums (ARIA) | 44 |
| Canadian Albums (Billboard) | 11 |
| US Billboard 200 | 4 |
| US Top Rock Albums (Billboard) | 3 |
| US Top Hard Rock Albums (Billboard) | 2 |

=== Year-end charts ===
Year-end chart performance for Take It to the Limit
| Chart (2009) | Position |
|---|---|
| US Billboard 200 | 104 |
| US Top Rock Albums (Billboard) | 35 |

== Certifications ==
Certifications for Take It to the Limit
| Region | Certification | Certified units/sales |
|---|---|---|
| United States (RIAA) | Gold | 500,000^{^} |
^{^} Shipments figures based on certification alone.
