= Extreme Behavior =

Studio album by Hinder
- Released: September 27, 2005
- Recorded: 2005
- Studios: The Armoury (Vancouver, British Columbia)
- Genres: Hard rock; post-grunge
- Length: 38:17
- Label: Universal Republic
- Producer: Brian Howes

Hinder chronology
| Far from Close (2003) | Extreme Behavior (2005) | Take It to the Limit (2008) |

Singles from Extreme Behavior
- 1. "Get Stoned" Released: July 25, 2005; 2. "Lips of an Angel" Released: April 3, 2006; 3. "How Long" Released: October 16, 2006; 4. "Better Than Me" Released: January 29, 2007; 5. "Homecoming Queen" Released: June 25, 2007; 6. "By the Way" Released: January 7, 2008

Extreme Behavior is the debut studio album by American rock band Hinder. It was released in 2005 by Universal Records garnering mixed to negative reviews, before going 3× platinum by the RIAA in January 2008. All songs were co-written by Brian Howes, except for "Shoulda", which was co-written with Brian Howes and Social Code. The song "Running in the Rain" did not make the cut for the album, but has been played at concerts on their North American tour.

== Release ==
The first single (and the song that brought attention to the band) was "Get Stoned". The album also contains Hinder's breakthrough single, "Lips of an Angel" which soared to #1 on the pop charts in 2006. The album's third single was "How Long", which was played on rock stations throughout the US. "Better Than Me" is the fourth single on Extreme Behavior. As of July 11, 2007, the album has sold 2,789,275 copies in the US. Despite not being released as a single, the song "By the Way" also had received airplay from several radio stations.

== Cover ==
The cover art is nearly identical to the cover art of the book How to Tell a Naked Man What to Do: Sex Advice from a Woman Who Knows by Candida Royalle; the only difference is on the book, the model is wearing black lingerie. One of the cover pictures has been altered and the pictures in front of the model have been altered to include the members of Hinder. The alternative album cover has been used in conservative markets the Middle East. The woman on the front of the original cover is not actress Katherine Heigl, despite common assertion.

== Reception ==
Professional ratings
Review scores
| Source | Rating |
|---|---|
| AllMusic | 2/5 stars |
| Digital Spy | 2/5 stars |
| Entertainment Weekly | B |
| Metal Hammer | 4/10 stars |
| Rocklouder | 2/5 stars |
| TuneLab Music | 7/10 stars |

Critical reviews of the album were mixed to negative. Extreme Behavior was, according to AllMusic, one of the worst albums of 2005, rating it two out of five stars. In its review of the album, reviewer Johnny Loftus said that "Hinder are so egregiously dull they appeal not to fans of music, but fans of high fives."

== Track listing ==
All music and lyrics written by Hinder and Brian Howes, apart from lyrics on tracks 1, 2 and 3 by Hinder, Howes and Joey Moi.

| No. | Title | Length |
|---|---|---|
| 1. | "Get Stoned" | 3:38 |
| 2. | "How Long" | 3:24 |
| 3. | "By the Way" | 3:51 |
| 4. | "Nothin' Good About Goodbye" | 3:52 |
| 5. | "Bliss (I Don't Wanna Know)" | 3:50 |
| 6. | "Better Than Me" | 3:43 |
| 7. | "Room 21" | 3:43 |
| 8. | "Lips of an Angel" | 4:21 |
| 9. | "Homecoming Queen" | 4:38 |
| 10. | "Shoulda" | 3:17 |

UK edition
| No. | Title | Length |
|---|---|---|
| 11. | "Lips of an Angel" (acoustic version) | 4:20 |
| 12. | "Room 21" (acoustic version; incorrect listed as "piano version") | 3:31 |

Wal-Mart deluxe edition (2006)
| No. | Title | Length |
|---|---|---|
| 11. | "Get Stoned" (live; censored) | 6:25 |
| 12. | "Room 21" (live; censored) | 5:35 |
| 13. | "Bed of Roses" (Bon Jovi cover) | 5:58 |
| 14. | "Take Me Home Tonight" (Eddie Money cover) | 3:37 |

Deluxe edition (2007)
| No. | Title | Length |
|---|---|---|
| 11. | "Born to Be Wild" (Steppenwolf cover) | 4:02 |
| 12. | "Get Stoned" (piano version) | 3:34 |

Deluxe version bonus DVD (2007)
| No. | Title | Length |
|---|---|---|
| 1. | "Better Than Me" (music video) |
| 2. | "Lips of an Angel" |
| 3. | "Get Stoned" |
| 4. | "Born to Be Wild" |
| 5. | "You Can't Make This Shit Up" (live concert from Alliant Energy Center) |

== Personnel ==
- Austin John Winkler – lead vocals, guitar
- Joe "Blower" Garvey – lead guitar, backing vocals
- Mark King – rhythm guitar, backing vocals
- Mike Rodden – bass guitar, backing vocals
- Robin Diaz – drums

=== Production ===
- Brian Howes – producer
- Mike Fraser – engineer
- Randy Staub – mixing
- Zach Blackstone – assistant mixing engineer
- George Marino – mastering at Sterling Sound, New York, NY

== Charts ==
=== Weekly charts ===
Weekly chart performance for Extreme Behavior
| Chart (2006–2007) | Peak position |
|---|---|
| Australian Albums (ARIA) | 1 |
| Canadian Albums (Nielsen SoundScan) | 13 |
| New Zealand Albums (RMNZ) | 9 |
| UK Albums (Official Charts) | 168 |
| UK Rock & Metal Albums (Official Charts) | 9 |
| US Billboard 200 | 6 |
| US Indie Store Album Sales (Billboard) | 10 |
| US Top Alternative Albums (Billboard) | 22 |
| US Top Rock Albums (Billboard) | 2 |

=== Year-end charts ===
2006 year-end chart performance for Extreme Behavior
| Chart (2006) | Position |
|---|---|
| US Billboard 200 | 36 |
| US Top Rock Albums (Billboard) | 7 |

2007 year-end chart performance for Extreme Behavior
| Chart (2007) | Position |
|---|---|
| Australian Albums (ARIA) | 24 |
| New Zealand Albums (RMNZ) | 42 |
| US Billboard 200 | 23 |
| US Top Rock Albums (Billboard) | 5 |

=== Decade-end charts ===
Decade-end chart performance for Extreme Behavior
| Chart (2000–2009) | Position |
|---|---|
| US Billboard 200 | 174 |

== Certifications ==
Certifications for Extreme Behavior
| Region | Certification | Certified units/sales |
|---|---|---|
| Australia (ARIA) | Platinum | 70,000^{^} |
| Canada (Music Canada) | Platinum | 100,000^{^} |
| New Zealand (RMNZ) | Platinum | 15,000^{^} |
| United States (RIAA) | 3× Platinum | 3,000,000^{^} |
^{^} Shipments figures based on certification alone.
