= Madame Mayhem =

American singer-songwriter

- Birth name: Natalie Ann Cohen
- Born: January 24, 1989 (age 36)
- Origin: Tenafly, NJ
- Genres: Rock
- Years active: 2011 - Present
- Labels: HeadBall Records (US), Metalville (UK / London)
- Website: http://www.madamemayhem.com

Natalie Ann Cohen (born January 24, 1989) known by her stage name as Madame Mayhem is an American singer/songwriter and a recording artist from New York.

== Early life ==
Madame Mayhem began her musical training at the Manhattan School of Music and went on to Frost School of Music at the University of Miami, where she completed a bachelor's degree in music—double majoring in classical opera and musical theatre—in three years.

== Music career ==
Prior to her debut album release, White Noise (October 2012), she was named a featured artist Clear Channel's iHeartRadio New Discovered and Uncovered Artist chart in February 2011. Her debut album was produced by Grammy Award-winning songwriter Mark Hudson.

Her sophomore album Now You Know (October 2015) and latest album Ready For Me (October 2017) were released under HeadBall Records in the US. Ready For Me was released via Metalville label in the UK and Europe. The album was produced by Corey Lowery. On various singles, she has worked with Ray Luzier of Korn, Billy Sheehan, and Keith Wallen from Breaking Benjamin.

She has performed at The Roxy, The Viper Room, Bowery Ballroom, Knitting Factory, The Cutting Room, the Bluebird Café, and has headlined the VH1’s “THAT METAL SHOW” Christmas Party.

She has also performed for Sunfest 2017, Shiprocked Cruise 2017, Hills of Rock 2018 and Sturgis Buffalo Chip, and toured with DORO, Mushroomhead, Sevendust and more.

== Discography ==
=== Studio albums ===
Title	Details
White Noise	Label: Headball Records; Year: 2012; Format: Digital Download, CD
Now You Know	Label: Headball Records; Year: 2015; Format: Digital Download, CD
Ready for Me	Label: Headball Records (US), Metalville (UK and Europe); Year: 2017; Format: Digital Download, CD

=== Singles ===
Title	Year	Peak chart positions	Label
Title	Year	US Main.	Label
"Addicted to You"	2009		Headball Records
"Save Me"	2012		Headball Records
"My Valentine"	2018		Headball Records
"Broken"	2019		Headball Records
"Breaking Down"	2020		Headball Records
"Livin' On The Edge" (Aerosmith Cover)	2020		Headball Records
"Cruel Heart"	2021		Headball Records
"I Am More"	2022	40	Headball Records
"Get It Right"	2023		Headball Records

=== Music videos ===
Title	Year	References
"Dead Will Rise"	2012	
"Monster"	2015	
"Left For Dead"	2016	
"All Around The World"	2017	
"Ready For Me"	2017	
"War You Started"	2018	
"Cruel Heart"	2021	
"I Am More"	2022	
"Get It Right"	2023	
