= Welcome to the Freakshow (Hinder album) =

Welcome To The Freakshow

Studio album by Hinder
- Released: December 4, 2012
- Recorded: 2012
- Genre: Hard rock; post-grunge
- Length: 36:48
- Label: Republic
- Producer: Cody Hanson; Marshal Dutton

Hinder chronology
| All American Nightmare (2010) | Welcome To The Freakshow (2012) | When the Smoke Clears (2015) |

Singles from Welcome to the Freakshow
- 1. "Save Me" Released: August 30, 2012; 2. "Ladies Come First" Released: November 12, 2012; 3. "Is It Just Me" Released: January 11, 2013; 4. "Should Have Known Better" Released: April 15, 2013; 5. "Talk to Me" Released: August 21, 2013

Alternative cover
- Alternate cover of Welcome to the Freakshow

Professional ratings
Review scores
| Source | Rating |
|---|---|
| AllMusic | 1.5/5 stars |
| aNewRisingMusic | 4/5 stars |

Welcome to the Freakshow is the fourth studio album by American rock band Hinder. Released on December 4, 2012 by Republic Records, it is the band's successor to All American Nightmare, released in 2010. It is the final studio album to feature founding vocalist Austin John Winkler.

The album debuted at number 65 on the Billboard 200, with 12,000 copies sold. It has sold 60,000 copies in the US as of May 2015.

== Production ==
On August 9, 2012, Hinder announced, via Facebook and Twitter, that their new album will be titled Welcome to the Freakshow. The album was released on December 4, 2012. Hinder released the first single, "Save Me," on August 30. According to Artistdirect, the group, in addition to typical rock music, incorporated elements of pop and country to the album's sound.

In an interview with Billboard, frontman Austin John Winkler said that Welcome to the Freakshow was recorded during "a really, really dark drug binge" for him; immediately after the album was completed he entered a rehabilitation program. He also said that the band wrote about thirty potential songs for the album before selecting the eleven included in the final release.

Austin John Winkler revealed that the album is reflection of "a really, really dark drug binge." He added, "I think you can definitely hear the turmoil in my voice. As soon as we got the record done I went into treatment to get help, and it's interesting to go back and listen to it now. Coming back, I have a whole new look on all of them and they mean something completely different to me now, too, so it's pretty cool. That's the beauty of music."

The album was produced by Hinder drummer Cody Hanson and Faktion's Marshall Dutton and mixed by James Michael of Sixx:A.M.

== Release ==
The album was announced on October 2, 2012 for release on December 4, 2012. First single "Save Me" preceded the album, having been released on August 30. Hellhound Music called the track "an in-your-face performance of arena rock at its best"

== Track listing ==
| No. | Title | Writer(s) | Length |
|---|---|---|---|
| 1. | "Save Me" | Austin John Winkler; Cody Hanson; Brad Warren; Brett Warren | 2:46 |
| 2. | "Ladies Come First" | Austin John Winkler; Cody Hanson; Josh Kear; Chris Tompkins | 3:02 |
| 3. | "Should Have Known Better" | Austin John Winkler; Cody Hanson; Marshal Dutton; Jeff Halavacs; Jacob Hindlin | 3:28 |
| 4. | "Freakshow" | Austin John Winkler; Cody Hanson; Craig Wiseman | 3:05 |
| 5. | "Talk to Me" | Austin John Winkler; Cody Hanson; Brad Warren; Brett Warren | 3:10 |
| 6. | "Get Me Away from You" | Austin John Winkler; Cody Hanson; Brad Warren; Brett Warren | 3:11 |
| 7. | "Is It Just Me" | Austin John Winkler; Cody Hanson; Brad Warren; Brett Warren | 3:20 |
| 8. | "I Don't Wanna Believe" | Austin John Winkler; Cody Hanson; Josh Kear; Richard Marx | 3:31 |
| 9. | "See You in Hell" | Austin John Winkler; Cody Hanson; The Warren Brothers | 3:17 |
| 10. | "Anyone But You" | Austin John Winkler; Cody Hanson; The Warren Brothers | 4:11 |
| 11. | "Wanna Be Rich" | Austin John Winkler; Cody Hanson; Marshal Dutton | 3:47 |
| Total length: | | | 36:48 |

Best Buy exclusive:

| No. | Title | Length |
|---|---|---|
| 12. | "Get Me Away from You" (acoustic version) | 3:15 |
| 13. | "Ladies Come First" (alternate version) | 3:09 |
| 14. | "Save Me" (acoustic version) | 2:38 |
| 15. | "See You in Hell" (acoustic version) | 2:52 |
| 16. | "Talk to Me" (acoustic version) | 3:13 |
| Total length: | | 15:07 |

== Personnel ==
- Austin John Winkler – lead vocals, guitars, piano
- Joe Garvey – lead guitar, backing vocals
- Mark King – rhythm guitar, backing vocals
- Mike Rodden – bass, backing vocals
- Cody Hanson – drums, backing vocals

=== Production ===
- Bob Ludwig – mastering

== Charts ==
| Chart (2012) | Peak position |
|---|---|
| US Billboard 200 | 65 |
| US Top Alternative Albums (Billboard) | 8 |
| US Top Hard Rock Albums (Billboard) | 3 |
| US Top Rock Albums (Billboard) | 14 |
