= Marshal Dutton =

American rock musician

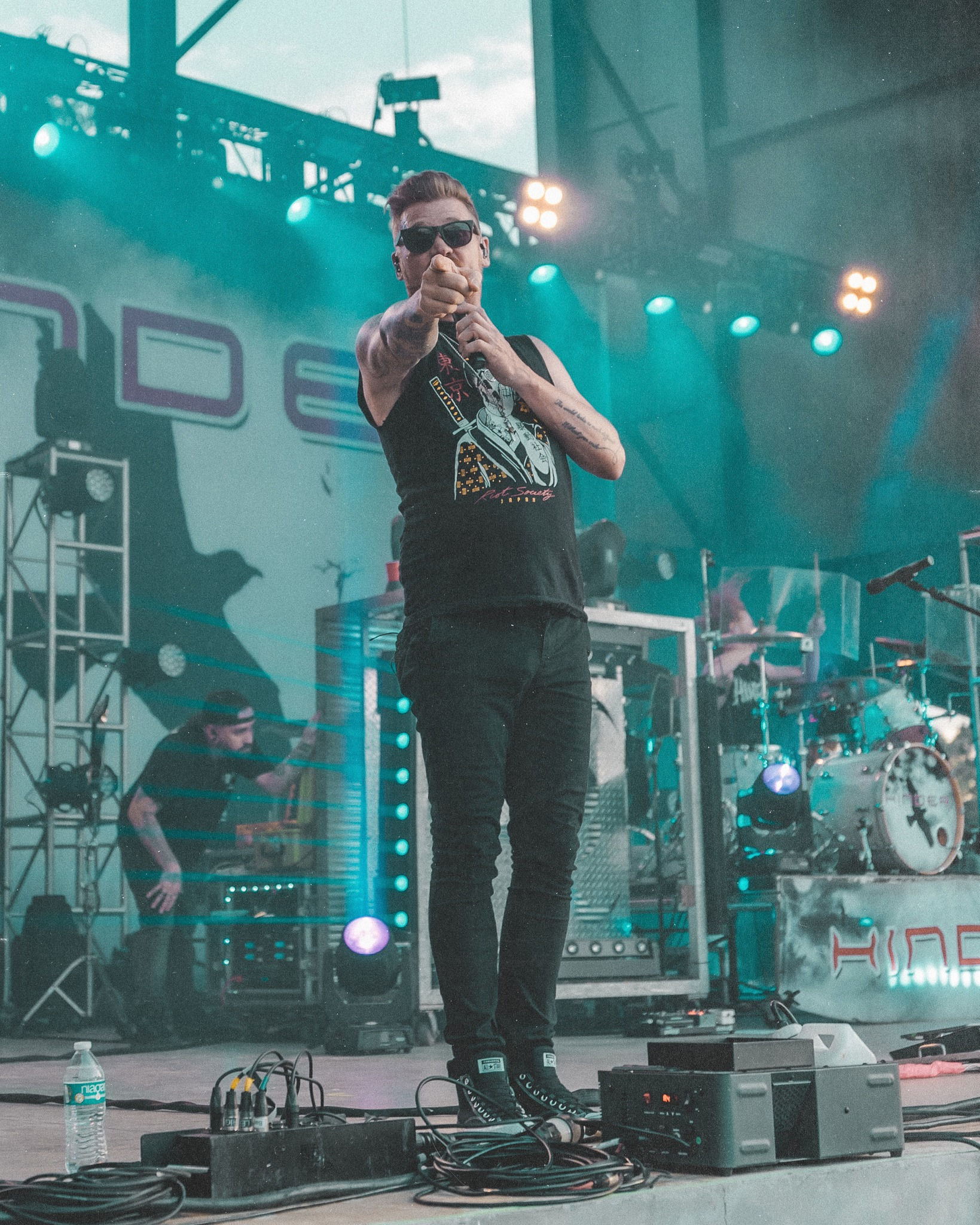
- Dutton performing with Hinder in July 2024.

Background information
- Born: Marshal Kent Dutton; March 15, 1978 (age 48); Tulia, Texas, U.S.
- Genres: Hard rock; alternative rock; post-grunge; pop; country
- Occupations: Musician; producer
- Instruments: Vocals; guitar
- Years active: 1999–present
- Member of: Hinder
- Formerly of: Faktion; Drankmore; Carb
- Website: hindermusic.com

Marshal Dutton (born March 15, 1978) is an American singer, songwriter, guitarist and producer best known for currently being the lead singer of the rock band Hinder. He has also seen success as the part-time lead vocalist and full-time lead guitarist in his former band Faktion. He also provides lead guitar and backing vocals in the country duo group Drankmore.

== Career ==
=== Career beginnings & Faktion: 1997–2010 ===
In the late 1990s, before joining the band Faktion where he rose to fame, Dutton was in a band called Carb with fellow musicians he befriended in Denton, Texas. After attending the University of North Texas in Denton, Texas, in 2002 Dutton met Josh Franklin, Jeremy Coan and Jeremy Moore. Together, the four-piece band formed Faktion where his bandmates nicknamed him "Marshal 'Wolfie' Dutton" due to his shaggy hair and scruffy beard. Originally, Dutton was the lead singer until the band later recruited a fifth member, Ryan Gibbs, to come in and be lead singer; Marshal then took over as lead guitarist for the band. Dutton recorded and released his first EP with the band titled Make a Dent in 2004, which attracted the attention of Roadrunner Records, and the band was signed to their label in October 2004. Dutton contributed on every Faktion release, which after 2004's Make a Dent EP consisted of the 2006 self-titled debut album Faktion, 2007's The B-Sides EP, 2008's Ignite Whats Inside EP and Crash Ashore EP, along with the 2008 standalone singles "Best Goodbye" and "Poison Ivy".

With the exception of a few random live appearances in 2009 and a couple of tour dates opening for Hinder in 2010 on their "All American Nightmare Tour", Faktion remained relatively inactive, allowing the members to pursue other interests and take on new projects. However, in mid-2010, the unreleased new songs "Dead to Me" and "Miss You" were posted by the band via Faktion's official Facebook page. There are also many unreleased recordings during Dutton's time with Faktion that still remain unreleased. The unreleased Faktion track "Dead to Me" was initially recorded and released on then-Faktion singer Aaron Pose's band Admiral Grey 2012 debut album and the track was also re-recorded and released on Hinder's 2015 album When the Smoke Clears with Dutton performing on lead vocals. As of 2022, a Faktion reunion is rumored to be in the works that will showcase new music and will see Ryan Gibbs return as lead vocalist, Marshal "Wolfie" Dutton on lead guitar, Josh Franklin on guitar, and Jeremy Blackstock on drums.

=== Producing music & Drankmore: 2010–2014 ===
In late 2009, Dutton began helping write and produce songs for Hinder's 2010 studio album All American Nightmare. Shortly thereafter, he founded Backlounge Productions alongside Hinder's drummer Cody Hanson. Their cliental includes acts such as Dutton's new country project "Drankmore" alongside country singer Jarrod Denton,"9 Left Dead" and former Faktion bandmate Ryan Gibb's new band "Right on Red".

In early 2012, Dutton alongside country singer Jarrod Denton founded a new country duo called "Drankmore". Their debut single titled "Beer Pressure" was released on March 2, 2012, followed by another single "You Got to Me" that was released on October 26, 2012. "You Got to Me" peaked at #7 on country music charts during the week of March 27, 2013.

Throughout 2012, Dutton once again served as co-producer on Hinder's 2012 album Welcome to the Freakshow with Cody Hanson. Dutton is also credited as being a co-writer on two songs featured on the album, the album's fourth single "Should've Known Better" and track 11 "Wanna Be Rich".

Dutton toured extensively with Drankmore throughout 2012 and 2013, opening for country acts such as Colt Ford and headlining shows at the "Blue Note" in Oklahoma City while also partaking in numerous recording sessions for the project, recording songs titled "I Do", "Then You Call", "What If I Stay", "Drunk Girlfriend", "Hard Stuff", and many more songs that remain unreleased as of 2022.

In August and September 2013, Dutton filled in for Austin John Winkler for a few concerts during Hinder's 2013 "Welcome to the Freakshow" summer tour, Dutton shared the role as lead singer with Jared Weeks from the band Saving Abel while it was announced Winkler had taken a temporary leave of absence from the tour citing medical reasons.

As of 2022, Drankmore has not played a live concert since last performing on April 12, 2014, at the Arbuckle Ballroom in Davis, Oklahoma, nor have they posted any updates on their social media pages; however there has been no official statement of a disbandment.

Throughout 2014, Dutton began work with Hinder for a third time, co-writing and producing songs for their upcoming album When the Smoke Clears. At the time, Nolan Neal was providing lead vocals for the album.

=== Joining Hinder, Dangerous Hippies & Gunfighter's Delimma: 2015–present ===
On January 20, 2015, it was announced that Dutton had joined Hinder full-time to be their new lead singer, replacing Austin John Winkler and his brief replacement Nolan Neal who provided vocals on the single "Hit the Ground" which Dutton helped co-write and produce.

Since becoming Hinder's lead singer, Dutton has extensively toured with the band, headlining tours with artists such as Full Devil Jacket, Buckcherry, Nonpoint, Like a Storm,Tantric, Puddle of Mudd, Shaman's Harvest, Within Reason, Adelitas Way, Wayland, Josh Todd & The Conflict, among others.

With Hinder, Dutton has released the 2015 album When the Smoke Clears, the 2016 EP Stripped, the 2017 album The Reign, the 2019 single "Halo", and the band's 2019 cover of the Eagles hit song "Life in the Fast Lane".

In October 2019, Dutton announced a new side band along with Hinder bandmate Cody Hanson titled "Dangerous Hippies". The side project will be used to release unreleased tracks that did not make the Hinder records. As of 2022, they have released the singles "Whoa", "Like a Ghost", "1982", "Contagious Dangerous", and "Hot Off the Press".

In the middle of 2021, Dutton announced a new side project of his, an instrumental band named "Gunfighter's Delimma" he formed in May 2020 with Oklahoma City musicians Sid Seymour (bass) and John Megehee (drums), with Dutton himself on lead guitar. The singles "This One's for You" was released on April 8, 2022, and the single "While the World Slept", which also served as the title for their upcoming debut album, was released on July 29, 2022. The debut album While the World Slept was released August 12, 2022.

== Discography ==
=== With Faktion ===
- Make a Dent - EP (2004)
- Faktion (2006)
- The B-Sides - EP (2007)
- Best Goodbye - Single (2008)
- Poison Ivy - Single (2008)
- Crash Ashore - EP (2008)
- Ignite Whats Inside - EP (2008)

=== With Drankmore ===
- "Beer Pressure" - Single (2012)
- "You Got to Me" - Single (2012)

=== With Hinder ===
- When the Smoke Clears (2015)
- Stripped (2016)
- The Reign (2017)
- Halo - Single (2019)
- Life in the Fast Lane (2019)
- Back to Life (2025)

=== With Dangerous Hippies ===
- Whoa (2019)
- Like a Ghost (2020)
- 1982 (2020)
- Contagious Dangerous (2020)
- Hot Off the Press (2020)

=== With Gunfighter's Delimma ===
- While the World Slept (2022)
