= Armoury Studios =

Canadian recording studio

Coordinates: 49.2704°N 123.1427°W

Armoury Studios is a Canadian recording studio located in Vancouver, British Columbia's Kitsilano neighbourhood.

== History ==
The Armoury building was constructed, from the ground up, in 1990 by Canadian songwriter/producer Jim Vallance. Vallance collaborated with architect Howard Airey on the building's design. Ron Obvious studio designer, oversaw the technical and acoustical elements.

The studio was purchased from Vallance in 1995 by friend and producer Bruce Fairbairn, who produced music there with such artists as Chicago, The Cranberries, INXS, Kiss, The Harvest, and the Atomic Fireballs before he died in 1999 during the mixing of Yes' The Ladder.

Since 1999, the studio has been owned and privately operated by the Fairbairn family, serving a variety of local and international clients, including such artists as Elvis Costello, Nickelback, Seal, R.E.M., Bruno Mars, Hinder, Norah Jones, Nothingface, AC/DC, Tegan and Sara, Garbage, Stone Sour and Strapping Young Lad, among others.

== Facilities ==
The studio features a Solid State Logic G+ Series 4072 mixing console with Total Recall and E Series "black knob" EQ as well as ten Neve 1081 Preamp/EQ's and eight Neve 1073 Preamp/EQ's. Also available to clients is a host of vintage outboard equipment and microphones from top manufacturers including Neumann and AKG among others.

The studio facility and equipment was maintained by Technical Director John Vrtacic until his death in 2009.

Other facilities include upper and lower lounges, stone fireplace, a kitchen and a patio with a barbecue and a view of the Burrard Inlet and North Shore mountains.
