= Austin John Winkler =

American singer (born 1981)

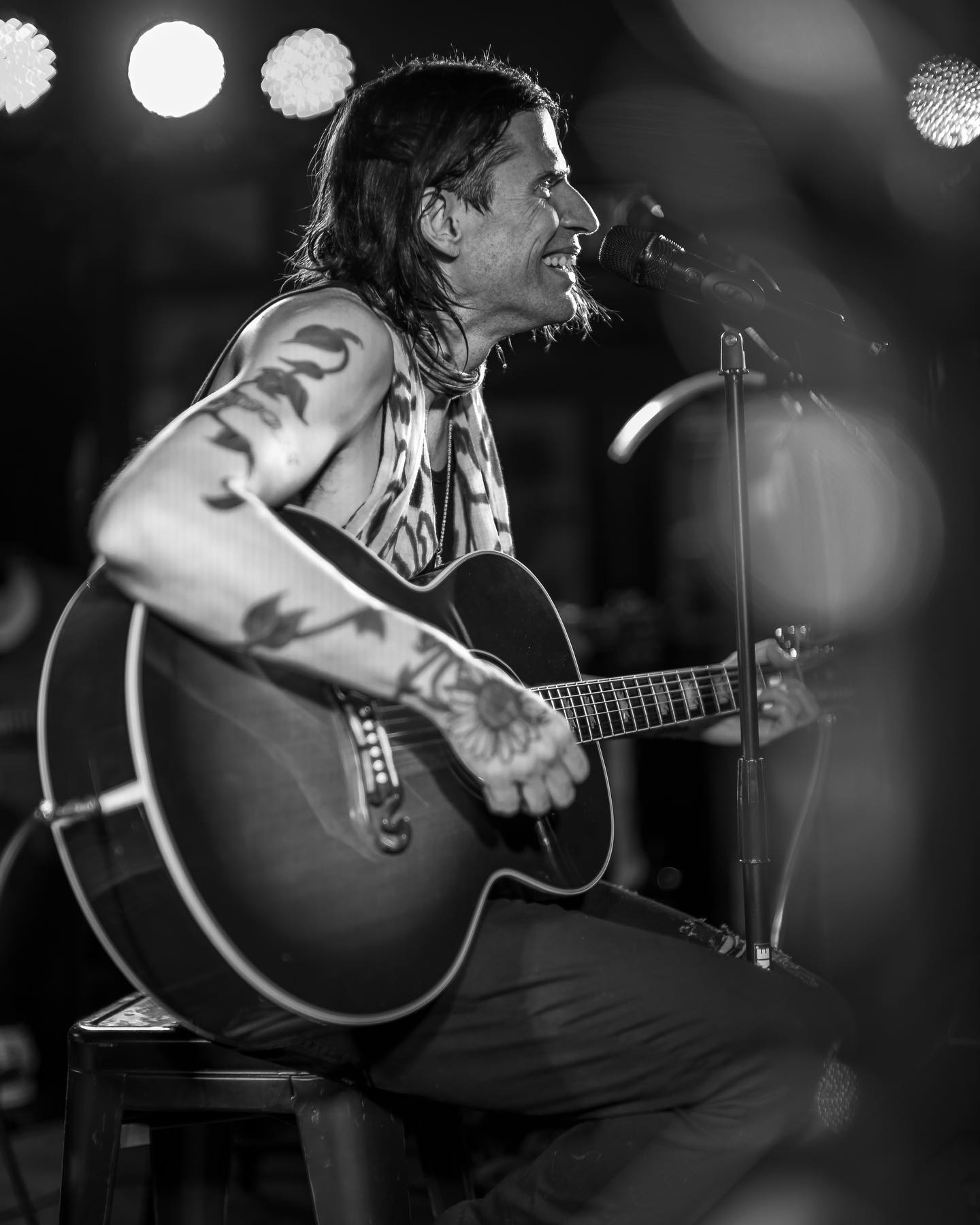
- Winkler performing live in 2023

Background information
- Born: October 25, 1981 (age 44); Oklahoma City, Oklahoma, United States
- Genres: Post-grunge; hard rock
- Occupations: Singer; songwriter
- Years active: 2001–18; 2022–present
- Labels: Republic; Universal Republic
- Formerly of: Hinder
- Website: thesuperjaded.com

Austin John Winkler (born October 25, 1981) is an American musician best known for being the original and former lead vocalist of the rock band Hinder. Since his departure from Hinder, he has continued his career as a solo artist under the name Austin John. Winkler's first release as a solo artist, a six-song EP titled Love Sick Radio, was released on April 22, 2016.

As of the first quarter of 2022, Winkler has released two new singles from his upcoming solo project, using his full name "Austin John Winkler" – the tracks "SuperJaded" and "Phoneline" were released for purchase on January 21, 2022, and March 25, 2022, with official music videos being posted to YouTube. On June 24, 2022, Winkler released his single titled "American Dreams" via all major digital music distributors.

== Hinder ==
Winkler was one of the founding members of Hinder and recorded a total of one EP (Far from Close), four studio albums (Extreme Behavior, Take It to the Limit, All American Nightmare, Welcome to the Freakshow) and released 24 singles to radio while with them during his 12-year tenure with the band.

On November 10, 2013, it was announced via Loudwire that Hinder had officially parted ways with Winkler, stating, "We hold no animosity towards Austin, and wish him the best. Although it was a difficult decision, it was the best thing for everyone involved and time for us to move on. This summer and fall tour was a tough one. We want to thank the fans for all their overwhelming support." It was confirmed by Winkler through a statement. Soon after the announcement, Winkler quickly stated he would continue his career as a solo artist.

== Solo career ==
=== 2013–2017: Work with Tantric and Love Sick Radio ===
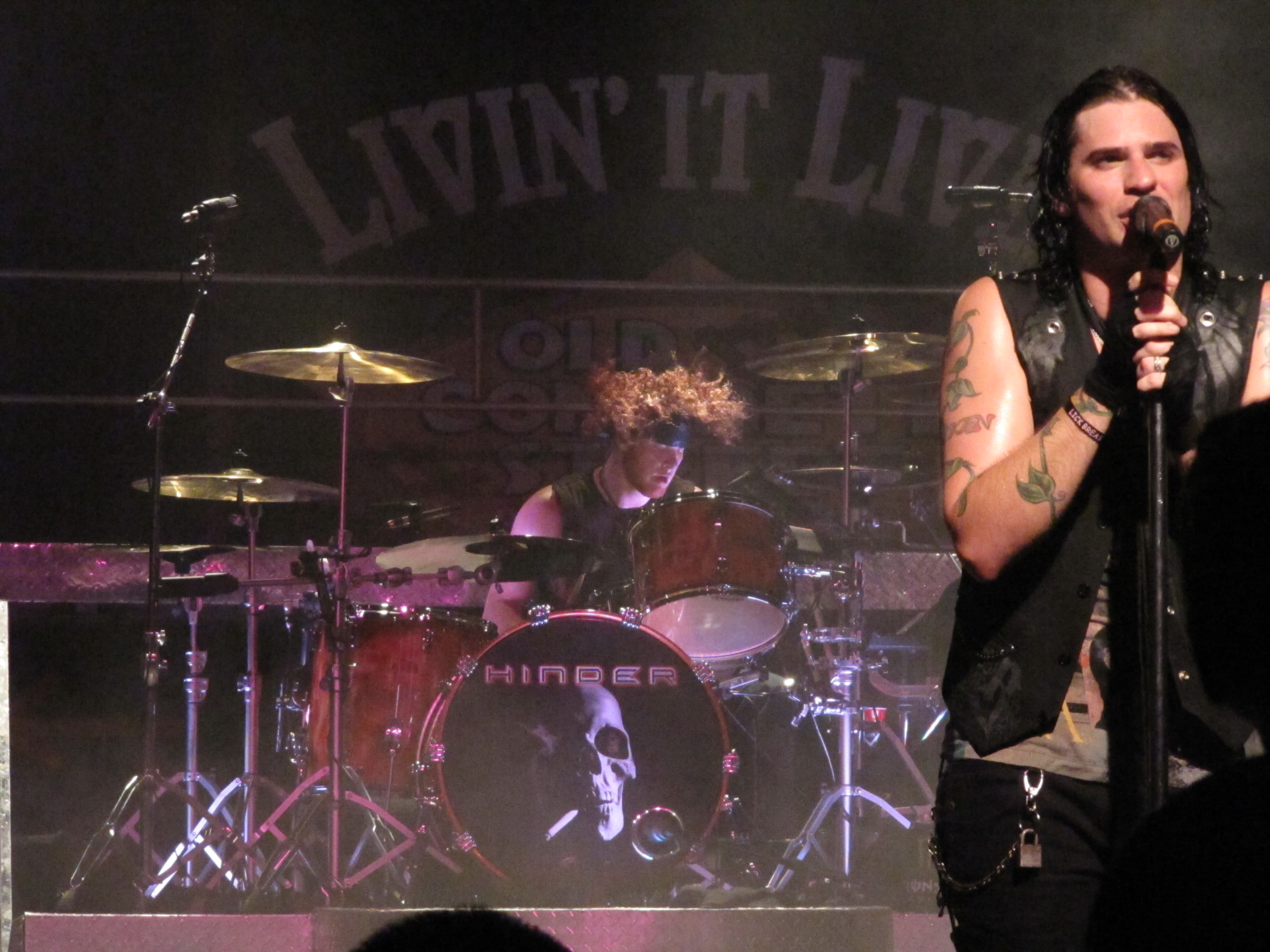
Winkler (right) performing with Hinder in 2009

In August 2013, a video posted on YouTube by Hugo Ferreira of the band Tantric revealed that Ferreria and Winkler had established a very good friendship and that Winkler was help writing songs for Tantric's then-upcoming album 37 Channels. Tantric's 37 Channels album was released on September 17, 2013, and Winkler was featured on two tracks titled "Bullet" and "Fault". On October 17, 2014, Winkler posted via his official Instagram account that he had signed to Universal Music Group as a solo artist. On November 8, 2014, Winkler performed as a special guest alongside Tantric at the Whisky a Go Go in West Hollywood, California on a stop while on their Blue Room Archives tour. Winkler performed the song "Fault" with Tantric, Winkler co-wrote the song with Tantric lead singer Hugo Ferreira in the summer of 2013, the song is featured on the album 37 Channels with Winkler providing guest vocals.

Winkler announced on April 18, 2016, that his debut six-song EP Love Sick Radio will be released on April 22, 2016, via Amazon. Austin performed his debut solo show on July 7, 2016, at the Whisky a Go Go in Hollywood, California. Since Austin has announced shows throughout Texas and Nashville, Tennessee in August 2016. Austin also announced that he is still currently recording for his debut full-length LP which should be released sometime in 2017. He added to the fans overwhelming support for the song "Phoneline to Heaven" it will be mastered and added to the record.

On June 9, 2017, Winkler announced his first major tour as a solo artist: he would embark on the Love Sick Radio tour in the fall of 2017 with Smile Empty Soul and Madame Mayhem as his support.

On August 30, 2017, it was announced that his former band-mates in Hinder were suing him for trademark infringement, the lawsuit alleged that Winkler was using Hinder's logo to promote his solo performances, the lawsuit stated that Winkler signed a Leaving Member Agreement when he departed the band, "acknowledging that he has no rights in the (trademark), or to promotional use of the name Hinder, and accepting a very limited license for use of the mark under certain express restrictions."

=== 2018–2021: Hiatus and Demo Slumber Parties ===
After wrapping up his fall 2017 tour with Smile Empty Soul and Autumn Rove, Winkler put a hiatus on his music career, remaining inactive for over two years and rarely posted updates on his social media accounts with the exception of a couple of posts in January and February 2018, one being a preview clip of a new song he recorded citing that his musical influences growing up was Eminem and Marilyn Manson, the song was originally titled "America Whatever" but was retitled and released as "American Dreams" on June 24, 2022.

Winkler announced in March 2020 that he was once again writing and recording new music for his debut solo album. On March 13, 2020, he announced he would be hosting a "Demo Slumber Party" on his Instagram account where he would be streaming the full-length demos of a few solo songs of his he had previously shared on social media years before. The tracks were, "Phoneline To Heaven", "America Whatever", a new song he just finished writing titled "SuperJaded" and a surprise bonus of Tina Turner's hit song "What's Love Got To Do With It", the songs were available on March 14, 2020, via his Instagram account and were removed after 24 hours.

Throughout the spring and early summer of 2020 Winkler hosted a handful of more "Demo Slumber Parties", streaming full-length demos of several more previously unreleased demo songs via his Instagram which included the tracks "Sleep Through My Pain", "Love Ain't Nothin'", "Dreams", "Maniac", "Back In The Day", "Control" and "Hey Love". The songs have since been removed from his social media pages.

In the summer of 2020, while in quarantine from the COVID-19 Pandemic, Winkler released several Instagram live videos confirming he is in the studio and working on new music, hopefully, to be released later this year. One of the tracks Austin played in the Instagram Live videos was a new fully recorded and finished song titled "Georgia". A few other tracks have been played but unnamed and unreleased.

=== 2021–present: SuperJaded and upcoming new music ===
On New Year's Eve 2021, Winkler announced via his social media that he will be releasing new music on February 11, 2022. However, on January 7, 2022, he announced in a new promo video he will be moving up the release and will now release the single "Super Jaded" along with the accompanying music video on January 21, 2022. The song will serve as the lead single for his long-awaited debut solo album.

"SuperJaded" was released January 21, 2022, as planned and was accompanied by the official music video.

On March 2, 2022, Winkler launched his first official website as a solo artist "THESUPERJADED.COM". The site features insight on his recent challenges and the difficulties that inspired him to write "SuperJaded" along with official merchandise.

On March 5, 2022, Winkler announced via teaser video posted to his social media pages that he will be releasing more new music on March 25, 2022.

On March 11, 2022, Winkler officially announced on a social media post he will finally be releasing his long-time, fan-favorite solo song "Phoneline to Heaven" (now simply being titled as "Phoneline") on March 25, 2022, nearly 8 years after initially sharing the song via his Instagram back in mid-2014.

Austin released a new single titled "American Dreams" on June 24, 2022, accompanied with the official music video. "American Dreams" serves as the third single from his upcoming solo project.

On October 26, 2022, Winkler released another new single that was previously unannounced, titled "Carry On".

On January 6, 2023, Winkler dropped a new single without any prior announcement titled "The Dance Song" and also released an official music video for the song via his YouTube channel.

On August 30, 2023, Austin collaborated with country singer Shaylen for a sequel to "Lips of an Angel", including the female perspective, called "Lips of an Angel Part II". The music video was released the same day. The single charted at place 45 on the Mainstream Rock Charts.

== Personal life ==
After shooting a music video for Hinder's version of the song "Born to be Wild" for NASCAR, Winkler began dating actress and model Jami Miller, who was a dancer in the video. In late 2007, the two became engaged. On December 21, 2007, Winkler was arrested for suspicion of DUI after leaving his engagement party. The two were married on July 30, 2008. They wed in Hawaii. Winkler wrote a song for their wedding titled "The Love I Live For". The song was never released but it can be found on YouTube.

Winkler and Jami separated in late 2014. Winkler officially filed for divorce in December 2015. In their divorce settlement, Winkler settled to share half of his rights to 81 Hinder songs with Jami. However, of all these songs, it does not include "Lips of an Angel". In that settlement, Winkler also had to pay Jami $12,000 in retroactive spousal support that was owed in 2017. After that was settled, Winkler owed her nothing else and was allowed to keep his property and 2016 Infiniti SUV.

Austin was engaged to singer/collaborator Sophie Summers in 2016, but ended their relationship in 2018.

In 2017, Winkler's girlfriend Jennifer Vetkos accused him of trying to kill her and threatening to release “revenge porn” to her family. According to court documents, she claimed that Winkler cut off her air supply. After her testimony, a judge granted Vetkos a temporary restraining order against Winkler.

In the summer of 2019, Winkler revealed to his fans via social media that he was becoming very ill. He did not disclose what exactly his condition was, but fans started noticing his significant weight loss from previous posts.

In January 2022, Winkler said in an interview with Loudwire that years of alcohol abuse caused liver and kidney failure, causing him to require dialysis for nine months between 2019 and 2020: "I was in the hospital for three months straight, 24 days in the ICU...I had to relearn how to walk again and the doctor said that I was about five days away from kicking it." His experience inspired the song "SuperJaded." He has been sober since May 2019.

== Discography ==
=== Hinder ===
Studio albums

- Extreme Behavior (2005)
- Take It to the Limit (2008)
- All American Nightmare (2010)
- Welcome to the Freakshow (2012)

EPs

- Far from Close (2003)

=== Solo releases ===
==== EPs ====
- Love Sick Radio (2016)

==== Singles ====
- "Carry You" (2016)
- "Howlin'" (2017)
- "SuperJaded" (2022)
- "Phoneline" (2022)
- "American Dreams" (2022)
- "Carry On" (2022)
- "The Dance Song" (2023)
- "Lips of an Angel Part II" (2023)

the Founder

EPs

- Walking ded (2025)

Singles

- "Sometimes" (2025)
- "F the World" (2025)
- "Too Broke to Fix" (2025)

^{(with Saliva)}

==== Music videos ====
Title	Year	Directors
"SuperJaded"	2022	Unknown
"American Dreams"	2022	Backhouse Tapes
"The Dance Song"	2023	Unknown
"Lips of an Angel Part II"	2023	Sean Hagwell
"Sometimes"	2025	Jack Dyer
"The Fall"	2025	Tim Katz
"Too Broke to Fix"	2025	Jeff Mozey
