= Hinder =

American rock band

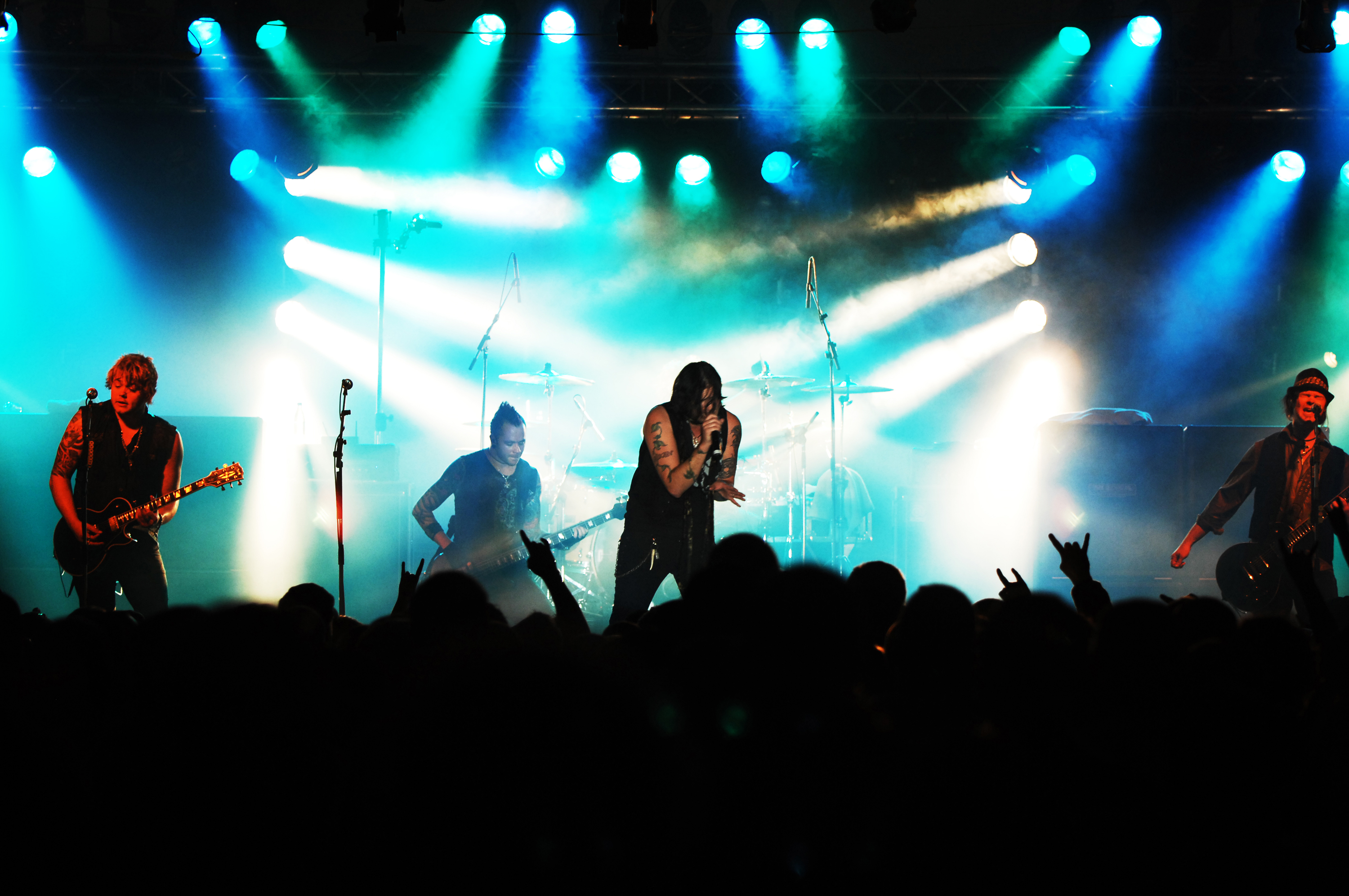
- Hinder performing in 2009

Background information
- Origin: Oklahoma City, Oklahoma, U.S.
- Genres: Post-grunge; hard rock; sleaze rock
- Years active: 2001–present
- Labels: Universal Republic; The End
- Members: Marshal Dutton; Joe "Blower" Garvey; Mike Rodden; Cody Hanson
- Past members: Austin John Winkler; Mark King; Cole Parker
- Website: hindermusic.com

Hinder
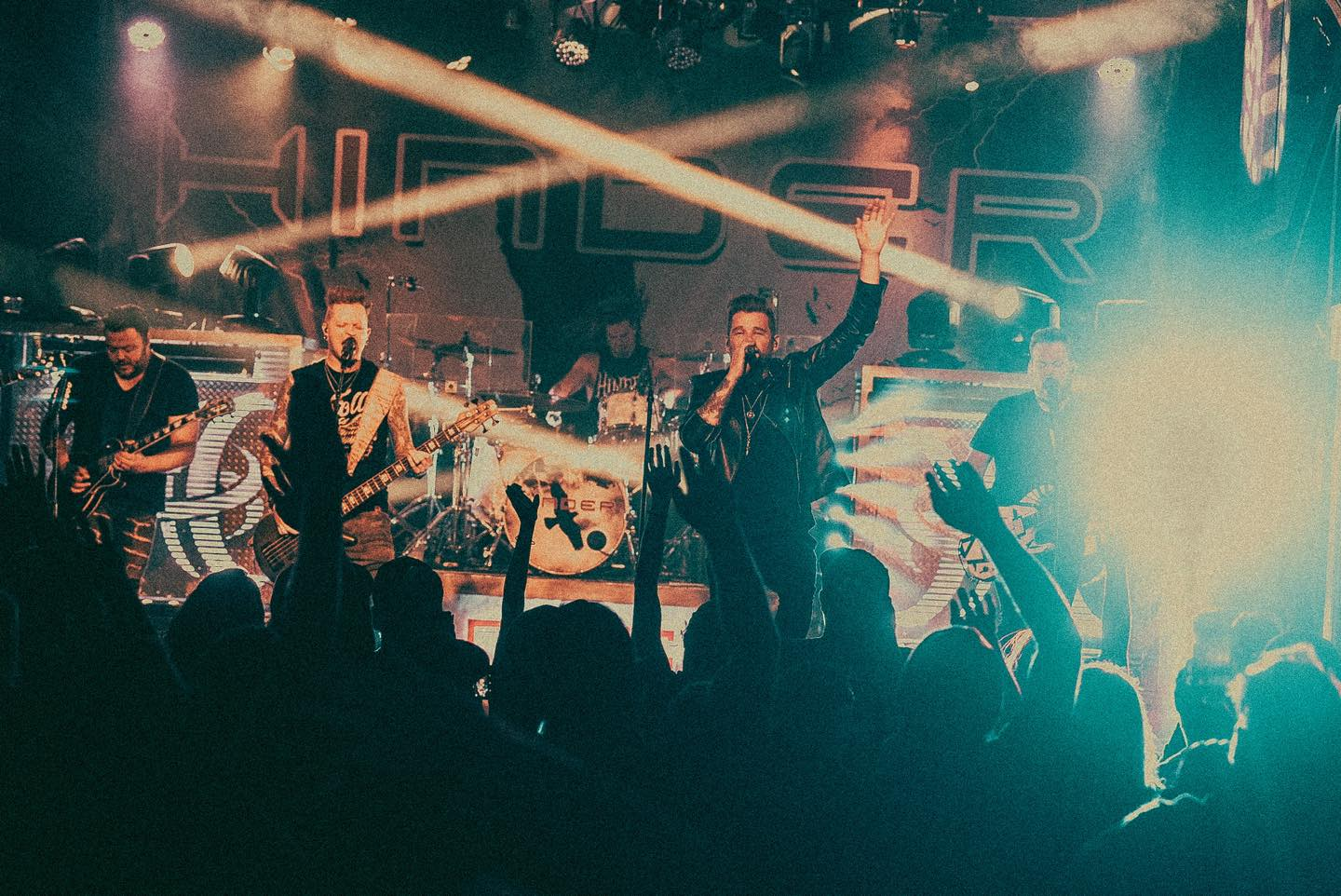
- Hinder performing in 2024

Background information
- Origin: Oklahoma City, Oklahoma, United States
- Genres: Post-grunge; hard rock
- Years active: 2001–present
- Labels: Universal Republic; The End; Evil Teen
- Members: Joe "Blower" Garvey; Cody Hanson; Mike Rodden; Marshal Dutton
- Past members: Austin John Winkler; Mark King; Cole Parker
- Website: hindermusic.com

Hinder is an American rock band from Oklahoma City, Oklahoma, formed in 2001 by lead singer Austin John Winkler, guitarist Joe "Blower" Garvey, and drummer Cody Hanson, with Far from Close bassist Mike Rodden and guitarist Mark King joining in 2003. The band released four studio albums with Winkler; Extreme Behavior (2005), Take It to the Limit (2008), All American Nightmare (2010) and Welcome to the Freakshow (2012). Cody Hanson, along with lead singer Austin Winkler, wrote the majority of the band's music on their first four albums. After Winkler left the band in 2013, they looked for a new lead vocalist, and added Marshal Dutton. They have since released When the Smoke Clears (2015) and The Reign (2017) with their new vocalist. Their seventh studio album is currently in the works. The band was inducted into the Oklahoma Music Hall of Fame in 2007.

== History ==
=== Formation and Far from Close: 2001–2004 ===
Before the band formed, Austin John Winkler sang in an Oklahoma City cover band until July 2001, when he met drummer Cody Hanson and lead guitarist Joe Garvey at a college party. Soon after, the three formed Hinder. Hanson commented on Winkler shortly after the band formed, saying he was "blown away" and "he has the kind of charisma very few people have and that unique voice. You can't really compare him to anybody." After recruiting bassist Cole Parker, they recorded a four-track demo disc with the track listing "Someday", "Like Me", "Broken", and "Worthless Home". The tracks "Someday" and "Broken" would later be re-recorded and put on their debut EP Far from Close and the other two tracks "Like Me" and "Worthless Home" still remain unreleased, only being able to find them on their demo CDs, although they are now posted on YouTube.

The band began performing at an Oklahoma City club called The Blue Note, building a local fan base. Profits from the shows went to advertising, as well as paying the expenses for the group's first release. In April 2003, Hinder entered the March Bandness contest for Oklahoma City radio station KHBZ-FM (94.7). They made it to the Final Four out of a field of 32, ultimately losing to the OKC group Falcon Five-O.

After saving enough money from local concerts, the band's debut EP Far from Close was released in 2003 on the independent label Brickden Records and sold around 5,000 copies. Bassist Mike Rodden was recruited from Oklahoma City band Shade Seven and rhythm guitarist Mark King joined the band later that year.

=== Extreme Behavior and Take It to the Limit: 2005–2009 ===
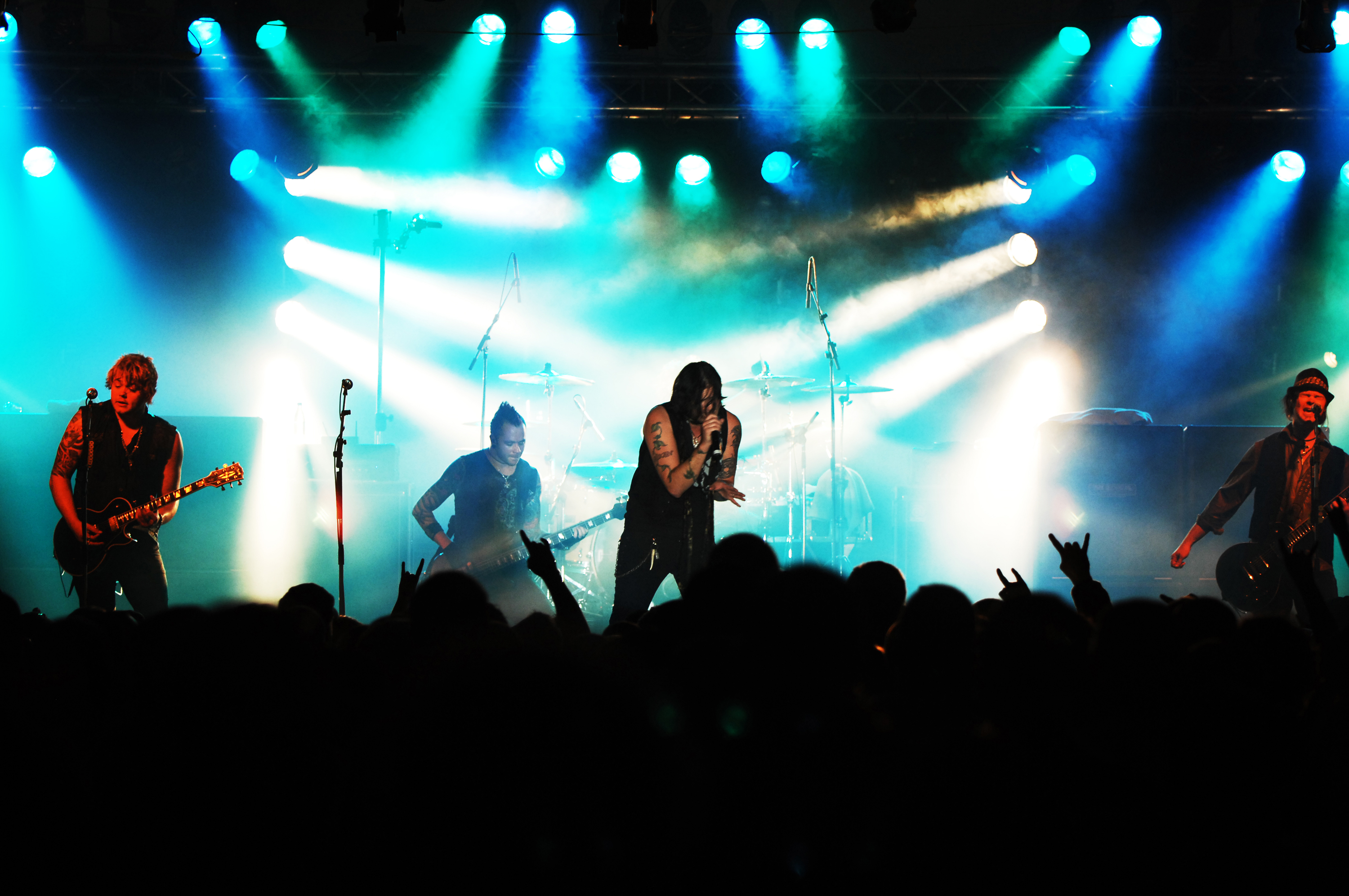
Hinder in 2009

After the release of Far from Close, Hinder was offered record deals by Atlantic Records, Roadrunner Records, and Universal Records, eventually signing with Universal Records in 2005. Later that year, their major-label debut album, Extreme Behavior, was released. It was produced by Brian Howes, who, along with Cody Hanson and Austin Winkler, wrote most of the material on the album. The album was engineered by Mike Fraser and Jay Van Poederooyen. The album reached triple-platinum, indicating sales of over 3 million units in the U.S.

Hinder toured and released singles in support of their first album. The group's debut single, "Get Stoned", was released in October 2005. The second single, "Lips of an Angel", entered charts in the U.S., Canada, Australia, New Zealand, and Singapore; the song lasted for 41 weeks in the New Zealand charts, two weeks of which were spent at the number one spot. The band's third single, "How Long", was released in September 2006 and appeared at number six on the U.S. Billboard Hot Mainstream Rock Tracks chart. Their second song to be released in New Zealand was "Better Than Me", which spent three weeks on the New Zealand charts, peaking at number 16. In 2007, Hinder was inducted into the Oklahoma Music Hall of Fame, and in October of the same year, the band released their limited edition CD/DVD of Extreme Behavior entitled You Can't Make This S**t Up.

The first single from the band's second album, "Use Me", was released on July 15, 2008, and peaked at No. 3 on the U.S. Mainstream Rock Tracks chart. The second album, Take It to the Limit, was released on November 4, 2008; the album marked a change in style in Hinder's music in that it moved the band in a slightly more glam metal-influenced direction. The title track features Mötley Crüe's Mick Mars on guitar. They announced the release of the album's second single, "Without You", through their MySpace page on September 13, 2008. Take It to the Limit debuted at number four on the Billboard 200 with 81,000 sales its first week and ended up going Gold in the U.S.

Through late 2008, Hinder headlined the Jägermeister Music Tour with Trapt and Rev Theory also on the bill. In early 2009, the group embarked on Mötley Crüe's Saints of Los Angeles Tour, which also included Theory of a Deadman and The Last Vegas. In July, Hinder embarked on Nickelback's Dark Horse Tour, which ran through Live Nation outdoor amphitheaters; other bands involved were Papa Roach, Breaking Benjamin, and Saving Abel. On March 27, 2013 Take It to the Limit was certified gold in the U.S.

=== All American Nightmare, Welcome to the Freakshow and Winkler's departure: 2010–2013 ===
During early 2010, the band was engaged in writing and recording material for their third album, titled All American Nightmare. It was released on December 7, 2010, with the first single, the title track, released on September 14, 2010. Although the album was originally planned to be produced by Howard Benson, Kevin Churko was later announced to be the producer.

Winkler said that the group started recording during the touring cycle for Take It to the Limit. "We wrote 70 or so songs, recorded about 50 and cut it down to 12", the singer explained. "It's something that we've never done before, so it's like our ultimate baby. A lot of the [other] songs could be shit, too, we don't know. You don't really know until you put it out there and have more than two people's opinion on it." Both he and drummer Cody Hanson mentioned the song "Memory" as one that was a strong contender for the final cut. "It's about being with your chick – the chick you've been with for a while, not some chick you've met on the road – and about being able to still have a good time with your wife or long-time girlfriend", said Hanson. "I've been in a relationship myself for nine years, so it was cool to write a song like that."

On August 9, 2012, Hinder announced that their next album would be titled Welcome to the Freakshow. It was released on December 4, 2012. Hinder released their first single, "Save Me", on August 30. On July 10, 2013, it was announced that lead singer Austin Winkler had entered rehab, and would not be touring with the band for the remainder of the year. Marshal Dutton, one of the band's producers, was brought in to fill in on lead vocals for a couple shows until Jared Weeks, of Saving Abel, joined the band to fill in for Winkler for the rest of the tour. On November 20, 2013, it was announced via Loudwire that Austin Winkler had left the band.

=== When the Smoke Clears and The Reign: 2014–2017 ===
On July 7, 2014, the band posted a video on their social media sites apologizing to fans for their inactivity and to announce that they had been writing new songs for the new album while searching for a new lead singer. They also announced a string of shows throughout the rest of the summer. Although never announced officially, the band played their shows with Nashville-based singer Nolan Neal on lead vocals.

On December 9, 2014, Hinder announced their new album, and that it would be titled When the Smoke Clears. On January 20, 2015, Hinder officially announced that Marshal Dutton would be their new lead singer, via social media sites. Dutton has been affiliated with the band since his former band Faktion toured with Hinder and Rev Theory on the Girls Gone Wild tour back in 2006. He had also been writing and recording for the band since 2009 when they were going through the writing and recording sessions for All American Nightmare. Dutton had been working on every Hinder album since, even co-producing Welcome to the Freakshow alongside drummer Cody Hanson. On March 17, 2015, the band released a preview of the first song on their record, "Rather Hate Than Hurt" via Loudwire, making it the second song to be released since founding vocalist Austin John Winkler departed the band in November 2013. The band also revealed that When the Smoke Clears will be released on May 12, 2015. The band went on tour in support of the new album starting in March 2015; they did a Summer tour throughout the U.S. with Full Devil Jacket and Ages Apart supporting them. In November 2015, Hinder announced their Winter tour with Shaman's Harvest, Within Reason, Sons of Texas, David Adkins, and Ages Apart. When the Smoke Clears spawned four singles, the most successful of which, "Intoxicated", debuted at #38 on the U.S. Active Rock Chart. The song was co-written with upcoming country singer Ryan Hurd.

After playing a show at the venue "Ziggy's by the Sea" in Wilmington, North Carolina, the group did an interview with The Baltimore Sun and talked about the band's place over the course of the past year. The group stated that they had no choice but to find a new lead singer in order to keep the band alive. The band went on to say that the change in singers was a fresh start for both Hinder and Austin Winkler, and that they are searching for another hit song as big as "Lips of an Angel".

On March 7, 2016, the band announced that their upcoming acoustic EP would be titled Stripped and will be released May 13, 2016. The EP will feature six tracks with one newly-recorded track titled "Not an Addict", which was originally recorded by K's Choice. The band went out on tour in support of the new EP on the Stripped Tour with Like a Storm as the opening act. The tour consisted of 22 shows over the course of June through July 2016. On March 2, 2017, the band announced a summer tour with Nonpoint.

On June 12, 2017, they announced the title of their sixth studio album The Reign, which was released on August 11, 2017. On August 29, 2017, it was revealed the remaining original members of Hinder were suing former lead singer Austin Winkler for trademark infringement. The lawsuit alleges that Winkler was promoting his own performances for his fall 2017 solo tour and music by the "unlawful use and exploitation of the Hinder trademark", and the group are asking Winkler to cease infringement and to pay over "all gains, profits and advantages realized from his infringing." In support of The Reign, on September 22, 2017, Hinder announced a fall co-headlining tour with Josh Todd & the Conflict. The tour ran from October through December with Wayland and Adelitas Way supporting.

=== "Halo", cover songs, side projects and King's departure: 2018–2023 ===
Throughout the winter and spring of 2018, drummer Cody Hanson and vocalist Marshal Dutton were working on new music for a yet-untitled project. They released numerous song clips throughout social media including a new Hinder song titled "Halo". In December 2018, the band announced a winter 2019 tour with Soil. In early January 2019, they announced their new single titled "Halo" would be released January 25; this single serves as their lead single for their untitled upcoming seventh studio album which was to be released later that year. In July 2019, the band released a cover of the hit song "Life in the Fast Lane". In February 2020, Hinder announced an Extreme Behavior 15th-anniversary tour for the summer and fall of 2020. The tour was delayed due to the COVID-19 pandemic.

Nolan Neal died from a drug overdose on July 18, 2022, aged 41. Simon Cowell expressed his condolences in an interview, saying "Unfortunately, it happens too much over the years. I was thinking about this the other day. People [who] passed too soon. Every time it happens, because you’ve gotten to know them, it's horrible."

In an Instagram story on February 8, 2025, former lead singer and founding member Austin John Winkler posted a new photo with current Hinder lead singer Marshal Dutton in a recording studio with the caption reading: "Ran into @hindermarshalofficial over the weekend. Haha I Ain’t seen this MoFucker in 12 years. Really great seeing you my man. Until next time". The photo was taken in a recording studio, leading which led to much speculation and fanfare in the comments about a potential reunion between Winkler and Hinder with both Winkler and Dutton sharing the role of lead singer in the same fashion Three Days Grace recently reunited with their original singer Adam Gontier and his replacement Matt Walst remaining in the band as well.

== Musical style and influences ==
Hinder's music has been categorized as post-grunge, hard rock, and sleaze rock. AllMusic described their style as a combination of "post-grunge guitar heaviness with hair metal-esque booze 'n' babes lyrical subject matter."

The band's influences include Theory of a Dead Man, Bush, Collective Soul, Creed, Foo Fighters, Guns N' Roses, Kiss, Nickelback, Nirvana, Soundgarden, Weezer, the Rolling Stones, Led Zeppelin, Aerosmith, Rainbow, Bob Seger, Ozzy Osbourne, Def Leppard, Bon Jovi, AC/DC, and Mötley Crüe.

== Awards and nominations ==
Award	Year	Nominee(s)	Category	Result	Ref.
Teen Choice Awards	2007	Themselves	Choice Breakout Group	Nominated	
Teen Choice Awards	2007	"Better Than Me"	Choice Rock Track	Nominated	

== Band members ==
=== Current members ===
- Joe "Blower" Garvey – lead guitar, backing vocals (2001–present); rhythm guitar (2001–03, 2021–present)
- Cody Hanson – drums (2001–present)
- Mike Rodden – bass guitar, backing vocals (2003–present)
- Marshal Dutton – lead vocals (2015–present)

=== Former members ===
- Cole Parker – bass guitar (2001–03)
- Austin John Winkler – lead vocals (2001–13)
- Mark King – rhythm guitar, backing vocals (2003–21)

==== Former touring musicians ====
- Jared Weeks – lead vocals (2013–14)
- Nolan Neal – lead vocals (2014–2015; died 2022)
- Josh Kulack – lead guitar, backing vocals (2022)
- Justin Shipley – rhythm guitar, backing vocals (2021–2026)

== Discography ==
Studio albums

- Extreme Behavior (2005)
- Take It to the Limit (2008)
- All American Nightmare (2010)
- Welcome to the Freakshow (2012)
- When the Smoke Clears (2015)
- The Reign (2017)
- Back to Life (2025)
