= Brian Howes =

Canadian songwriter and record producer (born 1965)

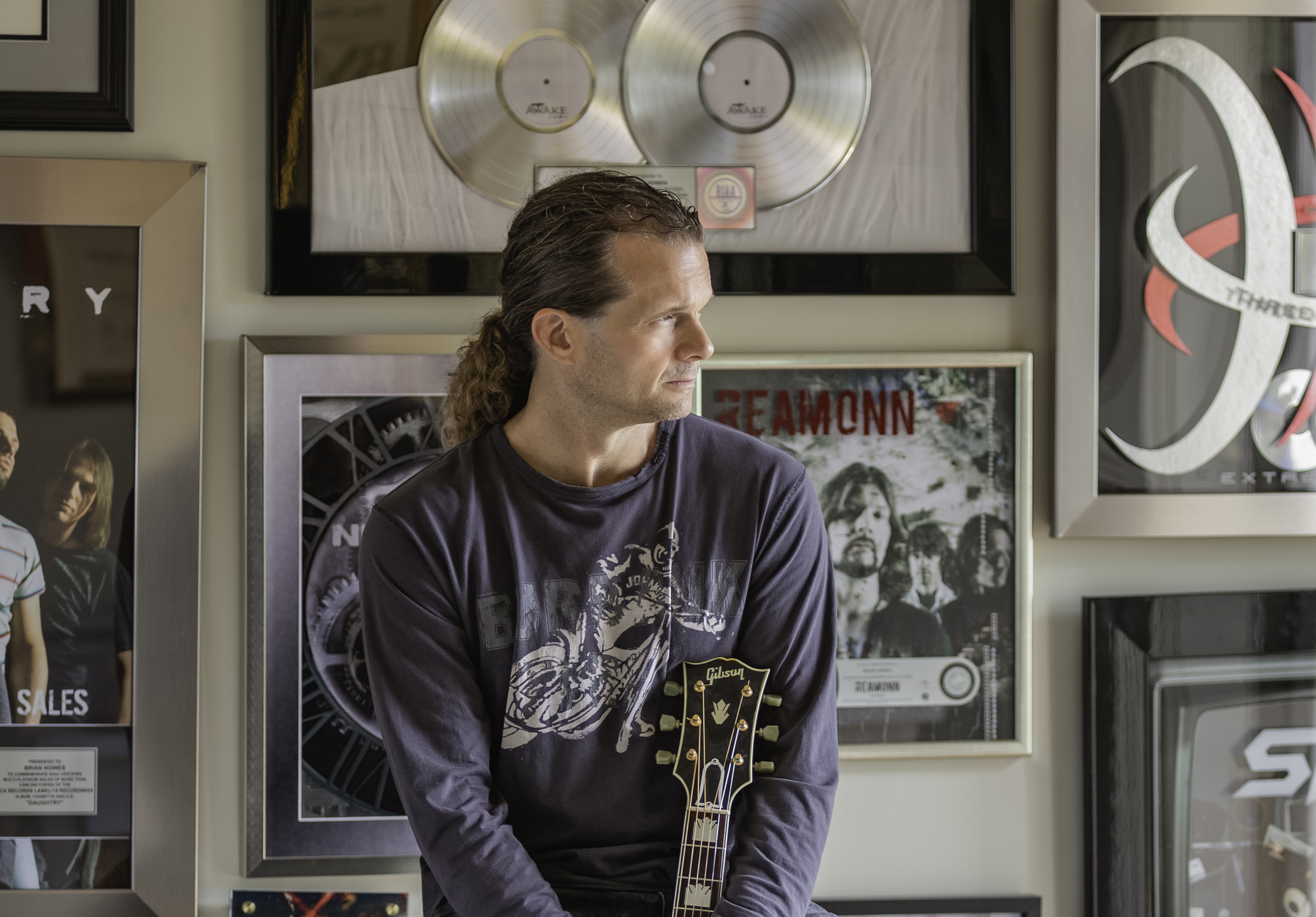

Background information
- Born: 1965 (age 60–61)
- Origin: British Columbia, Canada
- Genres: Rock; punk; heavy metal
- Occupations: Songwriter; record producer

Brian Howes, also known as Howes, is a Canadian songwriter and record producer who has found success within a wide range of genres, including his work with Puddle of Mudd and Simple Plan.

== Career ==
Howes played in a British Columbia band, Young Gun, and later fronted the group DDT which blended punk, ska, and rap. The band was signed to Metallica drummer Lars Ulrich's label The Music Company, through Elektra Records, in the late 1990s. DDT's Urban Observer album was supported by the first single "Walkabout".

With Brian Jennings, Axel G and Robin Diaz, Howes formed the alternative rock band Closure in 2002 in Vancouver and signed to TVT Records. They released a self-titled album in 2003 and their single, "Look Out Below", was included in the soundtrack of the 2003 film Darkness Falls. The group was dropped by the label and disbanded in 2006.

Howes went on to become a producer. He produced, engineered and co-wrote Hinder's debut album, Extreme Behavior. He also produced and helped write Skillet's 2006 album, Comatose. In 2007 he was named Producer of the Year at the Juno Awards.

In 2013 he was given a plaque on the Comox Valley Walk of Achievement.

== Awards ==
- SOCAN's International Achievement Award in 2010
- 2007 and 2012 JUNO Award for Producer of the Year for his work on Hedley and Nickelback.
- Nominated for Producer of the Year in 2010 and 2014.
- 2008 BMI Pop Awards, including top honor Song of the Year, as well as Top Digital Song for "Lips of an Angel"
- Won three additional BMI Pop Awards in 2009 for work with Daughtry and Skillet
- Won BMI award for "Light On" (David Cook) in 2009
- Won several SOCAN awards for various projects, including the Pop Rock Award in 2012
- Nominated for a Grammy (Skillet) in 2008
- Dove Award for his work on Skillet's Comatose

== Discography ==
=== Producer ===
Year	Artist	Album
1998	DDT	Urban Observer
2003	Closure	Closure
2005	Hedley	Hedley
2005	Hinder	Extreme Behavior
2006	Skillet	Comatose
2007	Faber Drive	Seven Second Surgery
2007	Puddle of Mudd	Famous
2008	Rev Theory	Light It Up
2008	Hinder	Take It to the Limit
2009	Puddle of Mudd	Volume 4: Songs in the Key of Love & Hate
2009	Boys Like Girls	Love Drunk
2011	Simple Plan	Get Your Heart On!
2011	Hedley	Storms
2011	Nickelback	Here and Now
2011	Stellar Revival	Love, Lust, and Bad Company
2013	Airbourne	Black Dog Barking
2013	Hedley	Wild Life
2015	Hedley	Hello
2016	Skillet	Unleashed
2020	Eric Ethridge	Good with Me
2024	Skillet	Revolution
2025	Men Without Hats	On the Moon

Artist	Album/Song	Producer/Writer
Adelitas Way	Adelitas Way	Producer/Writer
Adelitas Way	Stuck	Producer/Writer
Airbourne	"Black Dog Barking"	Producer/Writer
Boys Like Girls	"Love Drunk"	Producer/Writer
Caleb Johnson	"Forthcoming"	Writer
Daughtry	Daughtry	Writer
Daughtry	Leave This Town	Writer
Decyfer Down	Best I Can	Co-writer
David Cook	"Light On"	Co-writer
DDT	Urban Observer	Co-producer/writer
Eleven Past One	"Eleven Past One"	Producer/Writer
Halestorm	"Better Sorry Than Safe"	Co-writer
Hedley	"Hedley"	Producer/Writer
Hedley	"Famous Last Words"	Writer
Hedley	"The Show Must Go"	Producer/Writer
Hedley	"Storms"	Producer/Writer
Hedley	"Wild Life"	Producer/Writer
Hedley	"Hello"	Producer/Writer
Hinder	Extreme Behavior	Producer/Writer
Hinder	Take It to the Limit	Producer/Writer
Joe McElderry	"Wide Awake"	Writer
Landon Pigg	"Forthcoming"	Writer
Nickelback	Here and Now	Producer
Puddle of Mudd	Famous	Producer/Writer
Puddle of Mudd	Volume 4: Songs in the Key of Love & Hate	Producer/Writer
Reamonn	"Reamonn"	Producer/Writer
Reece Mastin	"Forthcoming"	Producer/Writer
Rev Theory	"Light It Up"	Producer/Writer
Serena Ryder	"Is It OK"	Writer
Simple Plan	"Get Your Heart On!"	Producer
Skillet	"Comatose"	Producer/Writer
Skillet	"Awake"	Writer
Sons of Sylvia	"Revelation"	Producer/Writer
Veer Union	"Veer Union"	Producer/Writer
Skillet	Revolution	Producer/Writer
