= The Voice of Vietnam season 3 =

The Voice of Vietnam
- Season 3
- Hosted by: Phan Anh; Linh Sunny
- Coaches: Đàm Vĩnh Hưng; Mỹ Tâm; Thu Phương; Tuấn Hưng
- Winner: Nguyễn Đức Phúc
- Winning coach: Mỹ Tâm
- Runner-up: Yến Lê

Release
- Original network: VTV3
- Original release: May 10 – September 20, 2015

Season chronology
- ← Previous; Season 2 Next → Season 4

The third season of The Voice of Vietnam began on May 10, 2015, on VTV3. This season was hosted by Phan Anh and Linh Sunny, who served as the social media correspondence. The coaching panel of this season were Đàm Vĩnh Hưng, Mỹ Tâm, Thu Phương and Tuấn Hưng.

This was the last season to feature Đàm Vĩnh Hưng as coach, and Phan Anh as host, while also the only season to have Mỹ Tâm as coach.

In the final show aired on 20 September 2015, Nguyễn Đức Phúc from Mỹ Tâm's team was announced as the winner of this season.

== Coaches and hosts ==
A lot of rumors arose when Cat Tien Sa announced that Giọng hát Việt- The Voice of Vietnam would return for its third season. In December 2014, it was speculated that Mỹ Tâm would become a coach in Thu Minh's previous position, especially when Thu Minh replaced Mỹ Tâm on the judging panel of Vietnam Idol for its sixth season. On March 6, 2015, a fanmade poster showing the coaches of the third season was leaked on the Internet, stating that the coaches would be Mỹ Tâm, Thu Phương, Tuấn Hưng and Bằng Kiều. However this poster was proved to be wrong by Cat Tien Sa, and Bằng Kiều announced that even though he did get an invitation to join the coaching panel, he turned the chance down. Upon seeing the fake poster, Tuấn Hưng himself confirmed that he would be a coach for The Voice. Even though he was in dark of who will sit with him on the coaching panel, he hoped that the fake poster is true. A week later, in a concert, Đàm Vĩnh Hưng, an original coach, confirmed that he would return to the show as a coach. On April 13, 2015, when the Blind Auditions were filmed, the coaching panel was officially confirmed: Đàm Vĩnh Hưng, Mỹ Tâm, Thu Phương and Tuấn Hưng. Mỹ Tâm was said to be paid 1,5 billion VND to join the show. Social think that the reason why Đàm Vĩnh Hưng decided to return to the show was because Mỹ Tâm was joining the show.

Phan Anh returned to the show for his third season as host, while Linh Sunny served as the backstage host and social media correspondence. The music director also changes, as musician Hồ Hoài Anh (coach on The Voice Kids) replaced Phương Uyên in the third season. Oppo Camera Phone replaced Nokia Lumia as the sponsor this season.

== Teams ==
Color key

- Winner
- Runner-up
- Third place
- Fourth place
- Eliminated in the Live shows
- Artist was stolen at the Battle rounds
- Eliminated in the Battle rounds

Coach	Artists				
Đàm Vĩnh Hưng					
Đàm Vĩnh Hưng	Trần Thị Tố Ny	Vicky Nhung	Thái Bảo Trâm	Phượng Vũ	Nguyễn Thị Thùy Linh
Đàm Vĩnh Hưng	Lê Quốc Vương	Nguyễn Quỳnh Như	~~Trần Thu Hòa~~	Trần Quốc Khánh	Nguyễn Thị Thu Hằng
Đàm Vĩnh Hưng	Nguyễn Thành Long	Dương Thành Nam	Nguyễn Thị Thu Phượng		
Mỹ Tâm					
Mỹ Tâm	Nguyễn Đức Phúc	Nguyễn Cao Bảo Uyên	Phạm Vân Anh	Đào Ngọc Sang	Nguyễn Thị Thu Thủy
Mỹ Tâm	Yến Tatoo	Lê Thái Sơn	Nguyễn Ngọc Linh Trang	Võ Thị Thương	Trần Thị Thương Hoài
Mỹ Tâm	Trương Ny	Phạm Phương Liên Trà	Lê Hoàng Phong		
Thu Phương					
Thu Phương	Nguyễn Hoàng Dũng	Nguyễn Kiều Anh	Phùng Khánh Linh	Phạm Anh Duy	Kimmese
Thu Phương	Trần Thu Hòa	Lê Hữu Toàn	~~Trần Lan~~	~~Nguyễn Thái Dương~~	~~Yến Tattoo~~
Thu Phương	~~Nguyễn Quỳnh Như~~	~~Lê Thái Sơn~~	Nguyễn Nho Anh Vũ		
Tuấn Hưng					
Tuấn Hưng	Yến Lê	Thủy Bùi	Hoàng Mai Hạ Vy	Trần Đăng Quang	Nguyễn Diệu Mi
Tuấn Hưng	Trần Lan	Nguyễn Thái Dương	~~Thái Bảo Trâm~~	~~Lê Hữu Toàn~~	Huỳnh Thụy Thanh Tú
Tuấn Hưng	Nguyễn Đặng Huyền Nga	Nguyễn Thị Minh Uyên	Lê Phương Thảo Linh		
Note: Italicized names are stolen contestants (names struck through within former teams).

== Blind auditions ==
Key	Coach hit his or her "TÔI CHỌN BẠN" (I WANT YOU) button	Contestant eliminated with no coach pressing his or her "TÔI CHỌN BẠN" (I WANT YOU) button	Contestant defaulted to this coach's team	Contestant elected to join this coach's team

=== Episode 1 (May 10) ===
Order	Artist	Hometown	Song	Coaches and artists choices			
Order	Artist	Hometown	Song	Đàm Vĩnh Hưng	Mỹ Tâm	Thu Phương	Tuấn Hưng
1	Phạm Thị Vân Anh	Hanoi	"All by Myself"				—
2	Lê Hữu Toàn	Hanoi	"Say Something"				
3	Nguyễn Ngọc Huy	Lâm Đồng	"La La La"	—	—	—	—
4	Lê Hoàng Phong	Hanoi	"Gửi gió cho mây ngàn bay"	—		—	—
5	Nguyễn Diệu Mi	Hanoi	"Em của ngày hôm qua"	—		—	
6	Nguyễn Thị Thu Thủy	Hanoi	"Stop!"			—	
7	Nguyễn Thị Thu Hằng	Nghệ An	"Nếu đời không có anh"		—	—	—
8	Hoàng Thu Thủy	Hanoi	"Chạy mưa"	—	—	—	—
9	Phùng Khánh Linh	Bắc Giang	"Maps"				
10	Trần Thu Hòa	Kon Tum	"Những lời buồn"		—		—
11	Kimmese	Hanoi	"Crazy"		—		

=== Episode 2 (May 17) ===
Order	Artist	Hometown	Song	Coaches and artists choices			
Order	Artist	Hometown	Song	Đàm Vĩnh Hưng	Mỹ Tâm	Thu Phương	Tuấn Hưng
1	Lê Quốc Vương	Ho Chi Minh City	"Mây"				—
2	Nguyễn Thị Minh Uyên	Huế	"Lovin' You"	—	—	—	
3	Lê Phương Thảo Linh	Hanoi	"Những ngày đã qua"			—	
4	Song Luân	Đồng Nai	"Đêm định mệnh"	—	—	—	—
5	Hoàng Mai Hạ Vy	Thanh Hóa	"Yêu mình anh"				
6	Yến Tattoo	Thanh Hóa	"Và em có anh"	—	—		—
7	Phạm Thu Phương	Thái Bình	"Chênh vênh"	—	—	—	—
8	Trần Thị Hằng	Hanoi	"Vì anh đánh mất"	—	—	—	—
9	Vicky Nhung	Hanoi	"Nobody's Perfect"				
10	Lê Thái Sơn	Ho Chi Minh City	"Nhìn lại"	—	—		
11	Nguyễn Cao Bảo Uyên	Đà Lạt	"Arirang alone"				

=== Episode 3 (May 24) ===
Order	Artist	Hometown	Song	Coaches and artists choices			
Order	Artist	Hometown	Song	Đàm Vĩnh Hưng	Mỹ Tâm	Thu Phương	Tuấn Hưng
1	Nguyễn Quỳnh Như	Ho Chi Minh City	"Hallelujah I Love Her So"	—	—		
2	Nguyễn Thị Minh Uyên	Ho Chi Minh City	"Anh"	—	—		
3	Phạm Tiến Đạt	Hanoi	"Chới với tôi ru tôi"	—	—	—	—
4	Nguyễn Quốc Đạt	Hải Phòng	"Chờ em trong đêm"	—	—	—	—
5	Trần Đăng Quang	Ho Chi Minh City	"Back at One"	—	—	—	
6	Trần Thị Tố Ny	Đà Nẵng	"Rời"/ "Love Me Like You Do"			—	—
7	Nguyễn Ngọc Linh Trang	Cần Thơ	"Điều ngọt ngào nhất"	—		—	—
8	Nguyễn Hoàng Dũng	Thái Nguyên	"Mùa yêu đầu"				
9	Trương Ny	Huế	"Chỉ còn lại tình yêu"	—		—	
10	Nguyễn Thị Thùy Linh	Hải Phòng	"One Moment In Time"			—	
11	Nguyễn Kiều Anh	Hanoi	"Rơi"				

=== Episode 4 (May 31) ===
Order	Artist	Hometown	Song	Coaches and artists choices			
Order	Artist	Hometown	Song	Đàm Vĩnh Hưng	Mỹ Tâm	Thu Phương	Tuấn Hưng
1	Nguyễn Thành Long	Ho Chi Minh City	"Bây giờ tháng mấy"			—	—
2	Phạm Phương Liên Trà	Đà Nẵng	"Angel"	—		—	
3	Dương Tuấn Anh	Hanoi	"White Love"	—	—	—	—
4	Lương Ngọc Trung Quân	Hawaii	"Something's Got a Hold on Me"	—	—	—	—
5	Dương Thành Nam	Hanoi	"When I Was Your Man"			—	
6	Giáp Lê Tuấn	Thanh Hóa	"Chưa bao giờ"	—	—	—	—
7	Huỳnh Thụy Thanh Tú	Ho Chi Minh City	"Careless Whisper"	—	—	—	
8	Nguyễn Thái Dương	Ho Chi Minh City	"It Will Rain"	—	—		
9	Võ Thị Thương	Nghệ An	"Yêu thương cho anh"	—		—	—
10	Trần Quốc Khánh	Hanoi	"Một ngày mùa đông"		—		—
11	Phạm Anh Duy	Hanoi	"Ain't No Sunshine"				

=== Episode 5 (June 7) ===
Order	Artist	Hometown	Song	Coaches and artists choices			
Order	Artist	Hometown	Song	Đàm Vĩnh Hưng	Mỹ Tâm	Thu Phương	Tuấn Hưng
1	Thái Bảo Trâm	Ho Chi Minh City	"To Love You More"				
2	Phạm Thị Thu Kiều	Lạng Sơn	"Thư chưa gửi anh"	—	—	—	—
3	Đào Ngọc Sang	Nghệ An	"Mưa trên ngày tháng đó"	—		—	
4	Nguyễn Đặng Huyền Nga	Hawaii	"Dream a Little Dream of Me"	—	—	—	
5	Nguyễn Thị Thu Phượng	Hanoi	"It's Not Goodbye"		—	—	—
6	Trần Thị Thương Hoài	Nghệ An	"Body Party"	—		—	—
7	Vũ Bùi Thu Thủy (Thủy Bùi)	Hanoi	"Through the Fire"	—	—		
8	Nguyễn Đức Phúc	Hanoi	"I'm Not the Only One"				
9	Phượng Vũ	Hải Phòng	"Nếu em được lựa chọn"		—		
10	Nguyễn Nho Anh Vũ	Đà Nẵng	"Take Me to Church"	—	—		—
11	Yến Lê	Hanoi	"All About That Bass"				

== The Battles ==
The battle rounds determine which contestant from each team is qualified for the Live Shows. Two (or three) contestants within a team are paired together to sing one song, but only one contestant is chosen for the live shows. Continuing with the format from season 2, each coach is allowed to "steal" two losing contestants from another coach's team. After the Battles, each team will have 7 artists for the lives. (This season didn't feature the Knockouts).

Color key:

Artist won the Battle and advanced to the Knockouts
Artist lost the Battle but was stolen by another coach and advanced to the Knockouts
Artist received more than one steal and elected to join this coach's team
Artist lost the Battle and was eliminated

Episode	Coach	Order	Winner	Song	Loser	'Steal' result			
Episode	Coach	Order	Winner	Song	Loser	Đàm Vĩnh Hưng	Mỹ Tâm	Thu Phương	Tuấn Hưng
Episode 5	Đàm Vĩnh Hưng	1	Lê Quốc Vương	"Tiếng đêm"	Trần Quốc Khánh	—N/a	—	—	—
Episode 5	Mỹ Tâm	2	Phạm Thị Vân Anh	"Mưa và nỗi nhớ"/ "Tiếng gió xôn xao"/ "Đêm nằm mơ phố"/ "Mưa"	Võ Thị Thương & Nguyễn Ngọc Linh Trang	—	—N/a	—	—
Episode 5	Đàm Vĩnh Hưng	3	Nguyễn Thị Thùy Linh	"Sao anh vẫn chờ"	Trần Thu Hòa	—N/a	—		—
Episode 5	Tuấn Hưng	4	Yến Lê	"Where did we go wrong"	Huỳnh Thụy Thanh Tú	—	—	—	—N/a
Episode 5	Thu Phương	5	Kimmese	"Nơi ấy bình yên"	Trần Thị Lan	—	—	—N/a	
Episode 6	Mỹ Tâm	1	Nguyễn Thị Thu Thủy	"Till It Hurts"	Trần Thị Thương Hoài	—	—N/a	—	—
Episode 6	Thu Phương	2	Phạm Anh Duy	"Ừ thì"	Lê Thái Sơn & Yến Tattoo	—	_{1}	—N/a	—
Episode 6	Đàm Vĩnh Hưng	3	Phượng Vũ	Đừng ngoảnh lại	Nguyễn Thị Thu Hằng	—N/a	Team full	—	—
Episode 6	Tuấn Hưng	4	Hoàng Mai Hạ Vy	"La Vie en rose"	Nguyễn Đặng Huyền Nga	—	Team full	—	—N/a
Episode 6	Thu Phương	5	Nguyễn Kiều Anh	"Chị tôi" Medley	Nguyễn Thái Dương	—	Team full	—N/a	
Episode 7	Tuấn Hưng	1	Nguyễn Diệu Mi	"Bad Boy"	Nguyễn Thị Minh Uyên & Lê Phương Thảo Linh	—	Team full	—	Team full
Episode 7	Thu Phương	2	Nguyễn Hoàng Dũng	"Thử thách"	Nguyễn Nho Anh Vũ	—	Team full	—N/a	Team full
Episode 7	Mỹ Tâm	3	Nguyễn Cao Bảo Uyên	"Xe đạp"	Trương Ny	—	Team full	—	Team full
Episode 7	Đàm Vĩnh Hưng	4	Trần Thị Tố Ny	"Rồi mai thức giấc"	Nguyễn Thành Long	—N/a	Team full	—	Team full
Episode 7	Tuấn Hưng	5	Thủy Bùi	"Halo"	Thái Bảo Trâm		Team full	—	Team full
Episode 8	Mỹ Tâm	1	Đào Ngọc Sang	"Mong anh về"	Phạm Phương Liên Trà	—	Team full	—	Team full
Episode 8	Tuấn Hưng	2	Trần Đăng Quang	"Beat It"	Lê Hữu Toàn		Team full		Team full
Episode 8	Mỹ Tâm	3	Nguyễn Đức Phúc	"Try"	Lê Hoàng Phong	—	Team full	Team full	Team full
Episode 8	Đàm Vĩnh Hưng	4	Vicky Nhung	"Wrecking Ball"	Dương Thành Nam & Nguyễn Thị Thu Phượng	—N/a	Team full	Team full	Team full
Episode 8	Thu Phương	5	Phùng Khánh Linh	"Anh và anh"	Nguyễn Quỳnh Như		Team full	Team full	Team full

_{1} Mỹ Tâm used both of her steals to save Lê Thái Sơn & Yến Tattoo, individually.

== Live Shows ==
=== Liveshow 1 and 2: Top 28 (July 12 and 19) ===
The remaining 28 artists competed on the first live round, in which team Thu Phương and Tuấn Hưng performed on the first night, while team Mỹ Tâm and team Đàm Vĩnh Hưng performed on the second night. Result was announced at the end of each liveshow. In each team, three top vote getters along with two saved by coach moved on to the next round, while the remaining two artists were eliminated.

- Group performance: The Voice of Vietnam 3 Coaches (Medley of "Yêu dại khờ"/ "Dĩ vãng cuộc tình"/ "Chưa bao giờ"/ "Vậy là mình đã xa nhau" & "60 năm cuộc đời")
- Musical guests: Bùi Anh Tuấn ("Buông")

Episode	Coach	Order	Artist	Song	Result
Episode 9 (July 12)	Thu Phương	1	Nguyễn Kiều Anh	"Huế Thương"	Public's vote
Episode 9 (July 12)	Thu Phương	2	Lê Hữu Toàn	"Đông cuối"	Eliminated
Episode 9 (July 12)	Tuấn Hưng	3	Hoàng Mai Hạ Vy	"Hà Nội niềm tin và hy vọng"	Public's vote
Episode 9 (July 12)	Tuấn Hưng	4	Nguyễn Diệu Mi	"I Love You"	Tuấn Hưng's choice
Episode 9 (July 12)	Thu Phương	5	Kimmese	"Vẽ"	Public's vote
Episode 9 (July 12)	Tuấn Hưng	6	Trần Đăng Quang	"Sẽ không còn nữa"	Tuấn Hưng's choice
Episode 9 (July 12)	Thu Phương	7	Phùng Khánh Linh	"Tuổi thơ con"	Public's vote
Episode 9 (July 12)	Tuấn Hưng	8	Yến Lê	"Healing"	Public's vote
Episode 9 (July 12)	Tuấn Hưng	9	Trần Lan	"Sao ta lặng im"	Eliminated
Episode 9 (July 12)	Thu Phương	10	Phạm Anh Duy	"Đường về"	Thu Phương's choice
Episode 9 (July 12)	Tuấn Hưng	11	Nguyễn Thái Dương	"Sáng tối"	Eliminated
Episode 9 (July 12)	Thu Phương	12	Nguyễn Hoàng Dũng	"Ai cũng có ngày xưa"	Thu Phương's choice
Episode 9 (July 12)	Thu Phương	13	Trần Thu Hòa	"Mẹ tôi"	Eliminated
Episode 9 (July 12)	Tuấn Hưng	14	Thủy Bùi	"I Will Survive"	Public's vote
Episode 10 (July 19)	Đàm Vĩnh Hưng	1	Nguyễn Thị Thùy Linh	"...Baby One More Time"	Đàm Vĩnh Hưng's choice
Episode 10 (July 19)	Đàm Vĩnh Hưng	2	Nguyễn Quỳnh Như	"Tình ca"	Eliminated
Episode 10 (July 19)	Mỹ Tâm	3	Phạm Thị Vân Anh	"Khóc một mình"	Public's vote
Episode 10 (July 19)	Mỹ Tâm	4	Nguyễn Thị Thu Thủy	"Papa"	Mỹ Tâm's choice
Episode 10 (July 19)	Mỹ Tâm	5	Yến Tattoo	"Mercy"	Eliminated
Episode 10 (July 19)	Đàm Vĩnh Hưng	6	Thái Ngọc Bảo Trâm	"Khoảng không chơi vơi"	Public's vote
Episode 10 (July 19)	Đàm Vĩnh Hưng	7	Lê Quốc Vương	"Như những phút ban đầu"	Eliminated
Episode 10 (July 19)	Mỹ Tâm	8	Đào Ngọc Sang	"Để nhớ một thời ta đã yêu"	Mỹ Tâm's choice
Episode 10 (July 19)	Mỹ Tâm	9	Nguyễn Cao Bảo Uyên	"Con có mẹ rồi"	Public's vote
Episode 10 (July 19)	Đàm Vĩnh Hưng	10	Phượng Vũ	"Bang Bang (My Baby Shot Me Down)"	Public's vote
Episode 10 (July 19)	Mỹ Tâm	11	Lê Thái Sơn	"50 Ways to Say Goodbye"	Eliminated
Episode 10 (July 19)	Đàm Vĩnh Hưng	12	Vicky Nhung	"Một nhà"	Public's vote
Episode 10 (July 19)	Mỹ Tâm	13	Nguyễn Đức Phúc	"Chắc ai đó sẽ về"	Public's vote
Episode 10 (July 19)	Đàm Vĩnh Hưng	14	Trần Thị Tố Ny	"Thức tỉnh"	Đàm Vĩnh Hưng's choice

=== Liveshow 3 and 4: Top 20 (July 26 and August 9) ===
Episode	Coach	Order	Artist	Song	Result
Episode 11 (July 26)	Tuấn Hưng	1	Nguyễn Diệu Mi	"Hãy thứ tha cho em"	Eliminated
Episode 11 (July 26)	Thu Phương	2	Kimmese	"Ngỡ đâu tình đã quên mình"	Eliminated
Episode 11 (July 26)	Thu Phương	3	Phùng Khánh Linh	"Cô gái đến từ hôm qua"/ "Và câu chuyện bắt đầu"	Public's vote
Episode 11 (July 26)	Tuấn Hưng	4	Hoàng Mai Hạ Vy	"Trống vắng"	Public's vote
Episode 11 (July 26)	Tuấn Hưng	5	Yến Lê	"Quay lưng"	Public's vote
Episode 11 (July 26)	Thu Phương	7	Phạm Anh Duy	"Giọt buồn để lại"	Thu Phương's choice
Episode 11 (July 26)	Thu Phương	8	Nguyễn Hoàng Dũng	"Không phải dạng vừa đâu"	Thu Phương's choice
Episode 11 (July 26)	Tuấn Hưng	8	Thủy Bùi	"Lạc"	Tuấn Hưng's choice
Episode 11 (July 26)	Thu Phương	9	Nguyễn Kiều Anh	"Dệt tầm gai"	Public's vote
Episode 11 (July 26)	Tuấn Hưng	10	Trần Đăng Quang	"You Are Not Alone"	Tuấn Hưng's choice
Episode 12 (August 9)	Đàm Vĩnh Hưng	1	Thái Ngọc Bảo Trâm	"I'm still loving you"	Đàm Vĩnh Hưng's choice
Episode 12 (August 9)	Đàm Vĩnh Hưng	2	Vicky Nhung	"Tìm"	Public's vote
Episode 12 (August 9)	Mỹ Tâm	3	Đào Ngọc Sang	"Nếu như"	Mỹ Tâm's choice
Episode 12 (August 9)	Đàm Vĩnh Hưng	4	Nguyễn Thị Thùy Linh	"Rung động"	Eliminated
Episode 12 (August 9)	Mỹ Tâm	5	Nguyễn Cao Bảo Uyên	"Giấc mơ tình yêu"/ "Nhé anh"	Public's vote
Episode 12 (August 9)	Đàm Vĩnh Hưng	6	Trần Thị Tố Ny	"Lạc"	Public's vote
Episode 12 (August 9)	Mỹ Tâm	7	Nguyễn Thị Thu Thủy	"Tôi tìm thấy tôi"/ "Feeling Good"	Eliminated
Episode 12 (August 9)	Mỹ Tâm	8	Phạm Thị Vân Anh	"Buồn"	Mỹ Tâm's choice
Episode 12 (August 9)	Mỹ Tâm	9	Nguyễn Đức Phúc	"Hello"	Public's vote
Episode 12 (August 9)	Đàm Vĩnh Hưng	10	Phượng Vũ	"Vệt nắng cuối trời"	Đàm Vĩnh Hưng's choice

=== Liveshow 5 and 6: Top 16 (August 16 and 23) ===
Episode	Coach	Order	Artist	Song	Result
Episode 13 (August 16)	Thu Phương	1	Phùng Khánh Linh	"Chạy"	Public's vote
Episode 13 (August 16)	Tuấn Hưng	2	Yến Lê	"Cho con được thay cha"	Public's vote
Episode 13 (August 16)	Thu Phương	3	Phạm Anh Duy	"Phố thị"	Eliminated
Episode 13 (August 16)	Tuấn Hưng	4	Thủy Bùi	"Genie in a Bottle"/ "Buông tay"	Public's vote
Episode 13 (August 16)	Thu Phương	5	Nguyễn Kiều Anh	"Độc ẩm"	Public's vote
Episode 13 (August 16)	Tuấn Hưng	6	Hoàng Mai Hạ Vy	"Giây phút cuối"	Tuấn Hưng's choice
Episode 13 (August 16)	Thu Phương	7	Nguyễn Hoàng Dũng	"Đường đêm"	Thu Phương's choice
Episode 13 (August 16)	Tuấn Hưng	8	Trần Đăng Quang	"Cha và mẹ"	Eliminated
Episode 14 (August 23)	Mỹ Tâm	1	Đào Ngọc Sang	"Sai"	Eliminated
Episode 14 (August 23)	Đàm Vĩnh Hưng	2	Vicky Nhung	"Anh nhớ em"	Public's vote
Episode 14 (August 23)	Mỹ Tâm	3	Nguyễn Cao Bảo Uyên	"And I Am Telling You I'm Not Going"	Public's vote
Episode 14 (August 23)	Đàm Vĩnh Hưng	4	Trần Thị Tố Ny	"Tình xót xa thôi"	Đàm Vĩnh Hưng's choice
Episode 14 (August 23)	Mỹ Tâm	5	Phạm Thị Vân Anh	"Chandelier"	Mỹ Tâm's choice
Episode 14 (August 23)	Đàm Vĩnh Hưng	6	Thái Ngọc Bảo Trâm	"Mắt buồn"	Public's vote
Episode 14 (August 23)	Mỹ Tâm	7	Nguyễn Đức Phúc	"Nếu như anh đến"	Public's vote
Episode 14 (August 23)	Đàm Vĩnh Hưng	8	Phượng Vũ	"Góc phố rêu xanh"/ "Tình ơi xin ngủ yên"	Eliminated

Non-competition performances
Order	Performer	Song
13.1	Hoàng Mai Hạ Vy and Trần Đăng Quang	"Đêm cô đơn"
13.2	Phùng Khánh Linh and Nguyễn Hoàng Dũng	"Tan biến"
13.3	Yến Lê and Thủy Bùi	"Born This Way"
13.4	Nguyễn Kiều Anh and Phạm Anh Duy	"Tình yêu màu nắng"
14.1	Vicky Nhung and Trần Thị Tố Ny	"Đừng lừa dối"
14.2	Đào Ngọc Sang and Nguyễn Cao Bảo Uyên	"Nơi tình yêu bắt đầu"
14.3	Thái Ngọc Bảo Trâm and Phượng Vũ	"I Have Nothing"
14.4	Phạm Thị Vân Anh and Nguyễn Đức Phúc	"Ngày mai"/ "Ban mai tình yêu"

=== Liveshow 7: Quarterfinals (August 30) ===
In the quarterfinals, the act with the most public votes from the public was automatically sent through to the semifinals. Coaches then saved one act from their own team from elimination, while the other act was sent home.

Episode	Coach	Order	Artist	Song	Result
Episode 15 (August 30)	Thu Phương				
Episode 15 (August 30)	Thu Phương	1	Phùng Khánh Linh	"Thương ca Tiếng Việt"	Eliminated
Episode 15 (August 30)	Thu Phương	2	Nguyễn Hoàng Dũng	"Mái đình làng biển"	Public's vote
Episode 15 (August 30)	Thu Phương	3	Nguyễn Kiều Anh	"Thư pháp"	Thu Phương's choice
Episode 15 (August 30)	Tuấn Hưng				
Episode 15 (August 30)	Tuấn Hưng	4	Yến Lê	"Don't leave me alone"	Tuấn Hưng's choice
Episode 15 (August 30)	Tuấn Hưng	5	Thủy Bùi	"My world"	Public's vote
Episode 15 (August 30)	Tuấn Hưng	6	Hoàng Mai Hạ Vy	"Để em rời xa"	Eliminated
Episode 15 (August 30)	Mỹ Tâm				
Episode 15 (August 30)	Mỹ Tâm	7	Nguyễn Cao Bảo Uyên	"Tự nguyện"	Public's vote
Episode 15 (August 30)	Mỹ Tâm	8	Nguyễn Đức Phúc	"Huyền thoại mẹ"	Mỹ Tâm's choice
Episode 15 (August 30)	Mỹ Tâm	9	Phạm Thị Vân Anh	"Màu hoa đỏ"	Eliminated
Episode 15 (August 30)	Đàm Vĩnh Hưng				
Episode 15 (August 30)	Đàm Vĩnh Hưng	10	Thái Bảo Trâm	"Hot"	Eliminated
Episode 15 (August 30)	Đàm Vĩnh Hưng	11	Vicky Nhung	"Flashlight"	Public's vote
Episode 15 (August 30)	Đàm Vĩnh Hưng	12	Trần Thị Tố Ny	"Say đắm"	Đàm Vĩnh Hưng's choice

=== Week 8: Semifinals (September 6) ===
The Semifinal worked exactly the way the previous seasons worked.

- Musical guests: Hoàng Thùy Linh ("Nhịp đập giấc mơ")

Episode	Coach	Contestant	Order	Song	Coach points	Public points	Total points	Result
Episode 16 (September 6)	Tuấn Hưng	Yến Lê	1	"Việt Nam trong tôi là..."	50	60	110	Advanced to Finals
Episode 16 (September 6)	Tuấn Hưng	Thủy Bùi	2	"Chỉ là quá khứ"	50	40	90	Eliminated
Episode 16 (September 6)	Thu Phương	Nguyễn Kiều Anh	3	"Ảo ảnh trưa"	0	45	45	Eliminated
Episode 16 (September 6)	Thu Phương	Nguyễn Hoàng Dũng	4	"Chưa bao giờ"/ "Chưa bao giờ"	100	55	155	Advanced to Finals
Episode 16 (September 6)	Mỹ Tâm	Nguyễn Đức Phúc	5	"Đã hơn một lần"/ "I Believe I Can Fly"	55	53	108	Advanced to Finals
Episode 16 (September 6)	Mỹ Tâm	Nguyễn Cao Bảo Uyên	6	"Yêu"	45	47	92	Eliminated
Episode 16 (September 6)	Đàm Vĩnh Hưng	Trần Thị Tố Ny	7	"Ai xuôi vạn lý"/ "Đá trông chồng"	75	56	126	Advanced to Finals
Episode 16 (September 6)	Đàm Vĩnh Hưng	Vicky Nhung	8	"Set Fire to the Rain"/ "Cơn mưa ngang qua"/ "Lặng thầm một tình yêu"/ "Đổi thay"	25	44	69	Eliminated

=== Week 9: Finals (September 13 and 20) ===
The Top 4 performed on September 13 to win the title, each finalist performed a cover song, an original song (or a song that describes them most) and a duet with their coach. The result was announced on the Gala show on September 20, when each contestant again performed a "song to win", then the voting window would be closed. The final show also featured performances from Taylor John Williams, a top 5 contestant of season 7 of The Voice .

Coach	Artist	Episode 17 (September 13)						Episode 18 (September 20)		Result
Coach	Artist	Order	Finalist's single	Order	Solo song	Order	Duet song (with Coach)	Order	Final song	Result
Tuấn Hưng	Yến Lê	1	"Cảm ơn chân thành"	8	"The Edge of Glory"	9	"Đam mê"/ "Nắm lấy tay anh"	3	"Nhà là nơi tìm về"	Runner-up
Thu Phương	Nguyễn Hoàng Dũng	2	"Yếu đuối"	5	"Huyền thoại hồ Núi Cốc"	11	"Tình ca"/ "Tình ca"	1	"Cây vĩ cầm"	Third place
Đàm Vĩnh Hưng	Trần Thị Tố Ny	3	"Không cần nói"	6	"Get High"	10	"Chuyện thành Cổ Loa"	2	"Còn thương rau đắng mọc sau hè"	Fourth place
Mỹ Tâm	Nguyễn Đức Phúc	4	"Yêu xa"	7	"Chảy đi sông ơi"	12	ABBA Medley: "Money, Money, Money", "SOS", "The Winner Takes It All", "Gimme! Gimme! Gimme!" & "Voulez-Vous"	4	"Tình cha"	Winner (49%)

Non-competition performances
Order	Performer	Song
17.1	Son Tung M-TP	"Em của ngày hôm qua"
18.1	Noo Phước Thịnh	"Hold Me Tonight"
18.2	Taylor John Williams	"Royals"
18.3	Vicky Nhung, Nguyễn Cao Bảo Uyên, Phạm Thị Vân Anh & Thủy Bùi	"Wings"
18.4	Vũ Thảo My	"Walk Away"
18.5	Bùi Anh Tuấn	"Ngừng"
18.6	Hồ Ngọc Hà	"What Is Love?"
18.7	Thu Phương	"Giữ lại hạnh phúc"
18.8	Đàm Vĩnh Hưng, Vicky Nhung & Phượng Vũ	"Anh nhớ em vô cùng"/ "Bình minh sẽ mang em đi"
18.9	Tuấn Hưng & his team	"We Are The World"
18.10	Mỹ Tâm & Nguyễn Đức Phúc	"Ước gì"
18.11	Taylor John Williams & the top 4	"Come Together"

== Elimination chart ==
Color key
Artist's info

- Artist from Team Đàm Vĩnh Hưng
- Artist from Team Mỹ Tâm
- Artist from Team Thu Phương
- Artist from Team Tuấn Hưng

Live show results per week
Artist	Week 1+2	Week 3+4	Week 5+6	Week 7	Week 8	Finals
Nguyễn Đức Phúc	Safe	Safe	Safe	Bottom two	Advanced	Winner
Yến Lê	Safe	Safe	Safe	Bottom two	Advanced	Runner-up
Nguyễn Hoàng Dũng	Bottom four	Bottom three	Bottom two	Safe	Advanced	3rd place
Trần Thị Tố Ny	Bottom four	Safe	Bottom two	Bottom two	Advanced	4th place
Nguyễn Cao Bảo Uyên	Safe	Safe	Safe	Safe	Eliminated	Eliminated (Week 8)
Thủy Bùi	Safe	Bottom three	Safe	Safe	Eliminated	Eliminated (Week 8)
Vicky Nhung	Safe	Safe	Safe	Safe	Eliminated	Eliminated (Week 8)
Nguyễn Kiều Anh	Safe	Safe	Safe	Bottom two	Eliminated	Eliminated (Week 8)
Thái Bảo Trâm	Safe	Bottom three	Safe	Eliminated	Eliminated (Week 7)	
Phạm Thị Vân Anh	Safe	Bottom three	Bottom two	Eliminated	Eliminated (Week 7)	
Phùng Khánh Linh	Safe	Safe	Safe	Eliminated	Eliminated (Week 7)	
Hoàng Mai Hạ Vy	Safe	Safe	Bottom two	Eliminated	Eliminated (Week 7)	
Phạm Anh Duy	Bottom four	Bottom three	Eliminated	Eliminated (Week 5+6)		
Phượng Vũ	Safe	Bottom three	Eliminated	Eliminated (Week 5+6)		
Đào Ngọc Sang	Bottom four	Bottom three	Eliminated	Eliminated (Week 5+6)		
Trần Đăng Quang	Bottom four	Bottom three	Eliminated	Eliminated (Week 5+6)		
Kimmese	Safe	Eliminated	Eliminated (Week 3+4)			
Nguyễn Thị Thu Thủy	Bottom four	Eliminated	Eliminated (Week 3+4)			
Nguyễn Diệu Mi	Bottom four	Eliminated	Eliminated (Week 3+4)			
Nguyễn Thị Thùy Linh	Bottom four	Eliminated	Eliminated (Week 3+4)			
Trần Thu Hòa	Eliminated	Eliminated (Week 1+2)				
Lê Hữu Toàn	Eliminated	Eliminated (Week 1+2)				
Trần Lan	Eliminated	Eliminated (Week 1+2)				
Nguyễn Thái Dương	Eliminated	Eliminated (Week 1+2)				
Nguyễn Quỳnh Như	Eliminated	Eliminated (Week 1+2)				
Lê Quốc Vương	Eliminated	Eliminated (Week 1+2)				
Yến Tattoo	Eliminated	Eliminated (Week 1+2)				
Lê Thái Sơn	Eliminated	Eliminated (Week 1+2)				
