= Craig Wayne Boyd =

American country singer and songwriter

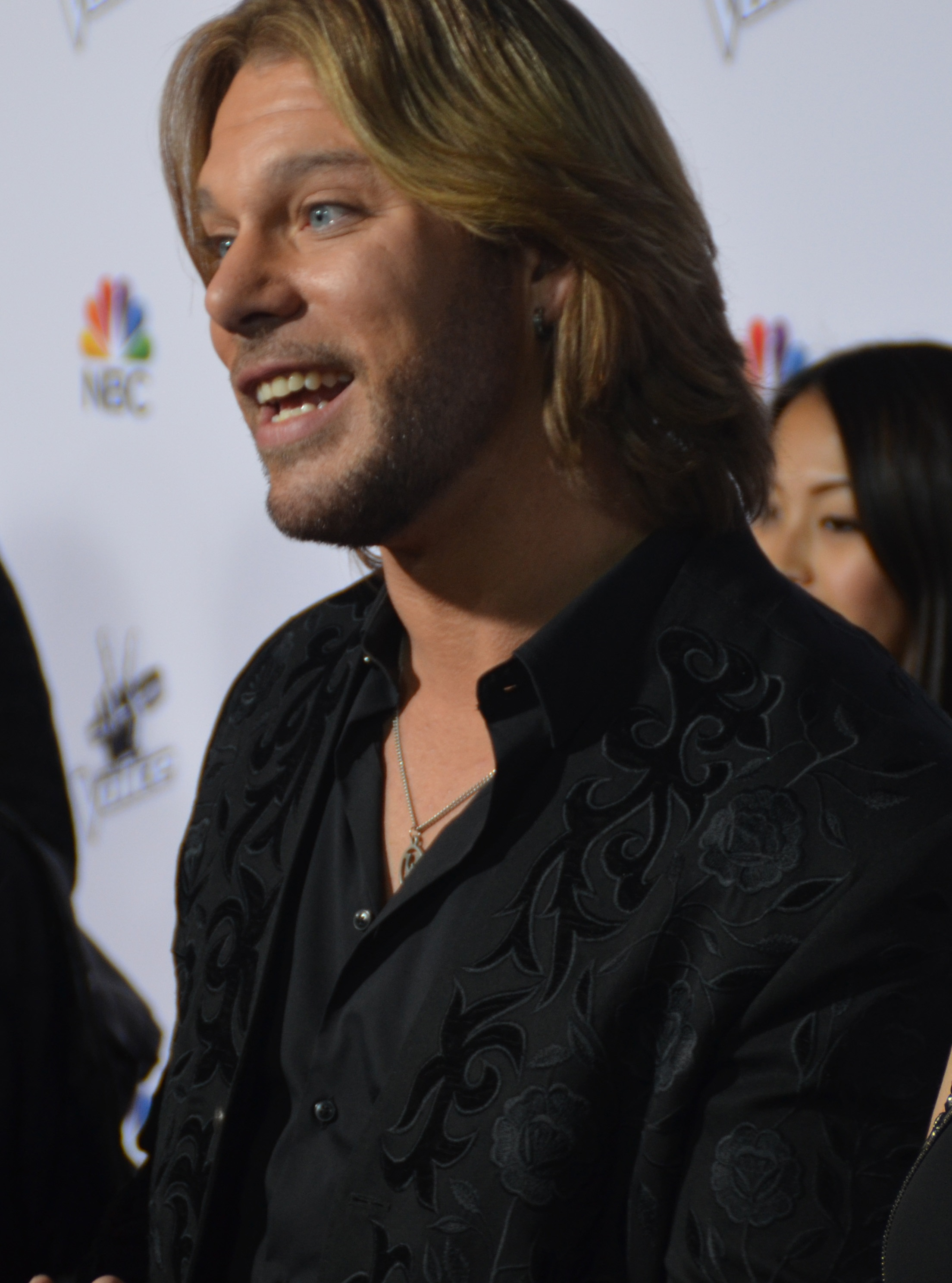
- Craig Wayne Boyd in 2014

Background information
- Born: Craig Wayne Boyd; December 31, 1978 (age 47); Mesquite, Texas, United States
- Genres: Country; country rock
- Occupation: Singer
- Instruments: Vocals, guitar
- Years active: 2004–present
- Labels: Dot; Universal Republic
- Website: http://www.craigwayneboyd.com/

Craig Wayne Boyd (born December 31, 1978) is an American country singer and songwriter. A native of Dallas, Texas, Boyd is based in and resides in Nashville, Tennessee. He is best known for winning Season 7 of NBC's reality TV singing competition The Voice as a part of Blake Shelton's team.

== Early life ==
Boyd was born on December 31, 1978, and raised in the Dallas suburb of Mesquite. He grew up influenced by gospel and country music. He played many instruments in his youth. He was also his church's choir director.

== Career ==
=== Early years ===
Boyd moved to Nashville at the age of 25 in 2004 to pursue a career in country music. Boyd was signed to a publishing deal with EMI. He spent many years songwriting. Boyd began touring, opening for acts such as Jamey Johnson, Randy Houser, and Brantley Gilbert.

=== The Voice (2014) ===
On Sept. 30, 2014, Boyd debuted on 7th season of The Voice. During his Blind Audition, Boyd sang "The Whiskey Ain't Workin'" by Travis Tritt and Marty Stuart. Two coaches (Blake Shelton and Pharrell Williams) turned around. Boyd chose Blake Shelton as his coach. During the Battle Rounds, Boyd was paired with James David Carter to sing "Wave on Wave" by Pat Green. Coach Shelton chose Carter over Boyd, but Boyd was stolen by Coach Gwen Stefani. In the Knockout Rounds, Boyd was paired with Anita Antoinette. Boyd sang "Can't You See" by The Marshall Tucker Band. Boyd lost the round, but was stolen back by Coach Shelton and advanced to the Live Playoffs. During the Live Playoffs, Boyd sang "Some Kind of Wonderful" and was saved by the Public's votes to advance to the Top 12. For the week of the Top 12, Boyd performed "You Look So Good in Love" by George Strait. Boyd was saved by the public's votes. For the week of the Top 10, Boyd performed "I Walk the Line" by Johnny Cash. Boyd was saved by the public vote with his performance in the Top 10 of the iTunes Chart. For the week of the Top Eight, Boyd performed "Take It Easy" by the Eagles. Boyd was saved by the public vote and advanced to the Top Five. For the week of the Semi-finals, Coach Shelton picked "Workin' Man Blues" by Merle Haggard for Boyd to sing and Boyd also sang "The Old Rugged Cross" which was in the iTunes Top 10. Boyd advanced to the finals. For the week of the Finals, Boyd performed three songs. He performed "In Pictures" by Alabama as his solo song. He performed "Boots On" by Randy Houser as a duet with his coach Blake Shelton. He also performed an original song called "My Baby's Got a Smile on Her Face". The song was written for Shelton, but he decided to give it to Boyd. The song is Boyd's debut single.

Boyd was declared the winner on December 16, 2014, giving Blake Shelton's team its fourth win out of the seven Seasons. He beat out Matt McAndrew, Chris Jamison, and Damien, all three of whom were from Team Adam Levine.

Shortly after winning the show and signing with Universal Republic and Dot Records, Boyd played at the Grand Ole Opry and went on a 65 city tour. In early May 2015, following 6 weeks of rumors, it was reported that Boyd parted ways with Dot. Boyd released one single under Dot records "My Baby’s Got A Smile On Her Face", which debuted at No. 1 on the Billboard Hot Country Songs. His second single "I'm Still Here" was released to iTunes under his own imprint – Long Haul Records. The song peaked at No. 35 on the Billboard Digital charts.

– Studio version of performance reached the top 10 on iTunes

Stage	Song	Original Artist	Date	Order	Result
Blind Audition	"The Whiskey Ain't Workin'"	Travis Tritt and Marty Stuart	Sept. 30, 2014	4.7	Pharrell Williams and Blake Shelton turned Joined Team Blake
Battles (Top 48)	"Wave on Wave" (vs. James David Carter)	Pat Green	Oct. 13, 2014	7.4	Defeated; Stolen by Gwen Stefani
Knockouts (Top 32)	"Can't You See" (vs. Anita Antoinette)	The Marshall Tucker Band	Nov. 3, 2014	13.7	Defeated; Stolen by Blake Shelton
Live Playoffs (Top 20)	"Some Kind of Wonderful"	Soul Brothers Six	Nov. 10, 2014	15.10	Saved by Public Vote
Live Top 12	"You Look So Good in Love"	George Strait	Nov. 17, 2014	18.10	Saved by Public Vote
Live Top 10	"I Walk the Line"	Johnny Cash	Nov. 24, 2014	20.6	Saved by Public Vote
Live Top 8	"Take It Easy"	Eagles	Dec. 1, 2014	22.2	Saved by Public Vote
Live Top 5 (Semi-finals)	"Workin' Man Blues"	Merle Haggard	Dec. 8, 2014	24.2	Saved by Public Vote
Live Top 5 (Semi-finals)	"The Old Rugged Cross"	George Bennard	Dec. 8, 2014	24.8	Saved by Public Vote
Live Finale (Final 4)	"My Baby's Got a Smile on Her Face"	Craig Wayne Boyd	Dec. 15, 2014	26.2	Winner
Live Finale (Final 4)	"Boots On" (with Blake Shelton)	Randy Houser	Dec. 15, 2014	26.5	Winner
Live Finale (Final 4)	"In Pictures"	Linda Davis	Dec. 15, 2014	26.9	Winner

== Discography ==
=== Albums ===
==== Studio albums ====
Title	Details
Craig Boyd	Release date: June 2, 2008; Label: Independent; Formats: CD, music download
I Ain't No Quitter	Release date: March 28, 2013; Label: Big Ride Entertainment; Formats: CD, music download
Top Shelf	Release date: October 27, 2017; Label: Copperline Music Group; Formats: CD, music download
From The Inbetween	Release date: November 6, 2019; Label: Independent; Formats: CD, music download

=== Singles ===
Title	Year	Peak chart positions			Sales	Album
Title	Year	US Country	US	CAN	Sales	Album
"I Ain't No Quitter"	2013	-	—	—		I Ain't No quitter
"My Baby's Got a Smile on Her Face"	2014	1	34	45	US: 99,000	The Voice: The Complete; Season 7 Collection
"I'm Still Here"	2015	—	—	—		Non-album Release
"Stuck in My Head"	2017					Top Shelf
"Better Together"	2018					

=== Releases from The Voice ===
==== Albums ====
Title	Details	Peak chart positions		Sales
Title	Details	US Country	US	Sales
The Voice: The Complete Season 7 Collection	Release date: December 16, 2014; Label: Universal Republic; Formats: CD, music download	35	41	US: 4,000

==== Singles ====
Title	Year	Peak chart positions			Sales	Album
Title	Year	US Country	US	CAN	Sales	Album
"The Whiskey Ain't Workin'"	2014	—	—	—		The Voice: The Complete; Season 7 Collection
"Wave on Wave" (with James David Carter)	2014	—	—	—		non-album single
"Can't You See"	2014	—	—	—		The Voice: The Complete; Season 7 Collection
"Some Kind of Wonderful"	2014	—	—	—		The Voice: The Complete; Season 7 Collection
"You Look So Good in Love"	2014	35	—	—		The Voice: The Complete; Season 7 Collection
"I Walk the Line"	2014	15	84	80	US: 46,000	The Voice: The Complete; Season 7 Collection
"Take It Easy"	2014	31	— (Note: "Take It Easy" did not enter the Billboard Hot 100, but peaked at No. 24 on the Bubbling Under Hot 100 Singles chart.)	—		The Voice: The Complete; Season 7 Collection
"Workin' Man Blues"	2014	37	—	—	US: 12,000	The Voice: The Complete; Season 7 Collection
"The Old Rugged Cross"	2014	7	59	—	US: 64,000	The Voice: The Complete; Season 7 Collection
"Boots On" (with Blake Shelton)	2014	33	—	—	US: 23,000	The Voice: The Complete; Season 7 Collection
"In Pictures"	2014	28	— (Note: "In Pictures" did not enter the Billboard Hot 100, but peaked at No. 6 on the Bubbling Under Hot 100 Singles chart.)	—	US: 30,000	The Voice: The Complete; Season 7 Collection
"—" denotes releases that did not chart

=== Music videos ===
Year	Video
2016	"My Baby's Got a Smile on Her Face"
2017	"Stuck In My Head"
2023	"One Line Away"

== Notes ==
Awards and achievements
Preceded by Josh Kaufman	The Voice (American); Winner; 2014 (Fall)	Succeeded by Sawyer Fredericks
Preceded by "Set Fire to the Rain"	The Voice (American); Winner's song "My Baby's Got a Smile on Her Face"; 2014 (Fall)	Succeeded by "Please"
