= Alex Lacasse =

- Origin: Orleans, Ontario, Canada
- Genre: Pop
- Occupation: Singer-songwriter
- Years active: 2009–2015
- Label: Universal Music Group
- Website: www.myspace.com/alexlacasse

Alex Lacasse is a pop music artist from Ontario, Canada who was active between the years 2009 and 2015.

Lacasse wrote and released his first single in 2010, titled "Like This, Like That", which had radio play across Canada. It peaked at #31 on the Canadian radio charts. Lacasse released his second single, "My Girl", to radio in July 2010. A music video was posted by his VEVO channel November 8, 2010.

Lacasse co-wrote the lead single "Over You" for the American girl group "Girlicious". It peaked at 15 on the Canadian radio charts.

In December 2014, Lacasse wrote "Velvet" with Kellen Pomeranz and Elof Loelv, performed by Chris Jamison on The Voice season 7 finale. The song peaked at #3 on iTunes, and has since sold over 100,000 digital downloads, hitting #53 on the Billboard Hot 100 chart. He also collaborated with singer-songwriter Corey Niles on the song "Chasing Stars", released in 2015.
