= Anita Antoinette =

American singer

- Born: Anita Antoinette Fearon; August 4, 1989 (age 37); Kingston, Jamaica
- Genres: Reggae, R&B, pop, soul
- Occupation: Singer
- Instruments: Vocals, acoustic guitar
- Years active: 2008 – present
- Website: www.anitaantoinette.com

Anita Antoinette Fearon (born August 4, 1989) is a Jamaican-American reggae singer-songwriter. Antoinette is best known for her appearance on NBC's reality TV singing competition The Voice Season 3 in which she was eliminated at the Blind Audition and her reappearance on Season 7 as part of Gwen Stefani's team, placing tenth in the competition.

== Early life ==
Anita Antoinette Fearon was born in Kingston, Jamaica, and is the daughter of reggae icon Clinton Fearon. Her father was co-founder, bass player and singer in revered roots-reggae band "The Gladiators". She spent the early years of her childhood in the community of Duhaney Park and attended the George Headley Primary School in Jamaica. Antoinette migrated to the United States in 1996, where she settled first in South Boston and then New Britain, Connecticut with her mother, brothers, and sister.

A self-taught singer and guitarist, Anita began writing her own music as a teenager, inspired both by her father and by other legends such as Bob Marley. She graduated from the prestigious Greater Hartford Academy of the Arts in 2008, and was accepted to the Berklee College of Music in Boston, Massachusetts, from which she holds a bachelor's degree in professional music with a concentration in music business and songwriting.

== Career ==
=== Early days ===
During high school, Anita performed on stages throughout New England, the Northeast and the Pacific Northwest. In 2008, she appeared at the Library of Congress in Washington DC performing material from The Real Ambassadors before the show's composer, Dave Brubeck.

Anita later appeared on Season 3 of The Voice. She covered Bob Marley's No Woman No Cry and was unable to turn a chair. She asked for an opportunity to redo the song a cappella, and "sang through her tears." As stated by Rolling Stone, "Christina shivered, and the others visibly rued that thing they'd just said about her not being able to sell the song."

=== 2014: The Voice ===
In September 2014, it was announced that Anita would compete in Season 7 of The Voice on the advice of Blake Shelton from Season 3.

On Episode 3 of Season 7, Anita covered Bob Marley's Turn Your Lights Down Low. All four coaches (Adam Levine, Gwen Stefani, Blake Shelton and Pharrell Williams) turned around. Anita chose Gwen Stefani as her coach. At the Battle rounds, Antoinette faced Mayra Alvarez where they sang "I Can See Clearly Now" Anita was then chosen over Alvarez, in the process advanced to the Knockout rounds. During the Knockouts, Antoinette sang "Rude" in which she defeated her opponent Craig Wayne Boyd and saw her advancement to The Live Playoffs. During the Playoffs Anita performed a rendition of Meghan Trainor's "All About That Bass" and was voted through by America into the Live Shows. The following week, the reggae singer sang a rendition of "Redemption Song" and was also saved by America's votes. In the Top 10 she did "Let Her Go" by Passenger, but in the results show Anita was in the bottom 3 and was eliminated along with Reagan James from Team Blake instead of teammate Ryan Sill.

– Studio version of performance reached the top 10 on iTunes

Stage	Song	Original Artist	Date	Order	Result
Blind Audition	"Turn Your Lights Down Low"	Bob Marley	September 29, 2014	2.14	All four chairs turned Joined Team Gwen
Battle Rounds (Top 48)	"I Can See Clearly Now" (vs. Mayra Alvarez)	Johnny Nash	October 21, 2014	2.15	Saved by Coach
Knockout Rounds (Top 32)	"Rude" (vs. Craig Wayne Boyd)	Magic!	November 3, 2014	2.16	Saved by Coach
Live Playoffs (Top 20)	"All About That Bass"	Meghan Trainor	November 11, 2014	2.17	Saved by Public Vote
Live Top 12	"Redemption Song"	Bob Marley	November 17, 2014	2.18	Saved by Public Vote
Live Top 10	"Let Her Go"	Passenger	November 24, 2014	2.19	Eliminated
Wildcard performance	"Waiting On The World To Change"	John Mayer	December 9, 2014	2.20	Eliminated

Non-competition performances
Stage	Song	Original Artist	Date	Order
Live Playoffs Results	"Riptide" (with Bryana Salaz, Ricky Manning, Ryan Sill, and Taylor John Williams)	Vance Joy	November 12, 2014	15.4
Live Top 12 Results	"The Tide Is High" (with Ryan Sill, Taylor John Williams, and Gwen Stefani)	The Paragons	November 18, 2014	19.1
Live Top 10	"Bless The Broken Road" (with DaNica Shirey and Reagan James)	Nitty Gritty Dirt Band	November 25, 2014	20.1
Live Finale	"Ain't No Mountain High Enough" (with Damien, DaNica Shirey, and Elyjuh Rene)	Marvin Gaye & Tammi Terrell	December 16, 2014	20.1

== Artistry ==
=== Influences ===
Her diverse style is influenced by artists such as Bob Marley, India Arie, Stevie Wonder, Maxwell, Erykah Badu, Lauryn Hill, Earth Wind & Fire, Donny Hathaway, Ella Fitzgerald, Jonny Lang and her father, Clinton Fearon.
