= The Voice (American TV series) season 7 =

Season of the US television series

The Voice
- Season 7
- Promotional poster featuring coaches Williams, Levine, Stefani, and Shelton
- Hosted by: Carson Daly
- Coaches: Adam Levine; Gwen Stefani; Pharrell Williams; Blake Shelton
- No. of contestants: 48 artists
- Winner: Craig Wayne Boyd
- Winning coach: Blake Shelton
- Runner-up: Matt McAndrew

Release
- Original network: NBC
- Original release: September 22 – December 16, 2014

Season chronology
- ← Previous; Season 6 Next → Season 8

The seventh season of the American reality talent show The Voice premiered on September 22, 2014, on NBC. Carson Daly returns as the show's host. Adam Levine and Blake Shelton returned as coaches, while Gwen Stefani and Pharrell Williams joined as new coaches, replacing Shakira and Usher.

Craig Wayne Boyd was named the winner of this season, marking Blake Shelton's fourth win as a coach, and making Boyd the second stolen artist (and the only artist who has been stolen twice) to win the entire American season after Josh Kaufman in the previous season.

== Coaches and host ==
Veteran coaches Adam Levine and Blake Shelton were joined by Pharrell Williams and Gwen Stefani, who replaced Usher and Shakira. The team advisors in this season include Stevie Nicks for Team Adam, Bush frontman Gavin Rossdale for Team Gwen, Little Big Town for Team Blake and Alicia Keys for Team Pharrell, along with Taylor Swift serving as an advisor for all teams during the knockouts. Meanwhile, Carson Daly is back at the helm as host for his seventh season.

Coaches and Host of The Voice Season 7

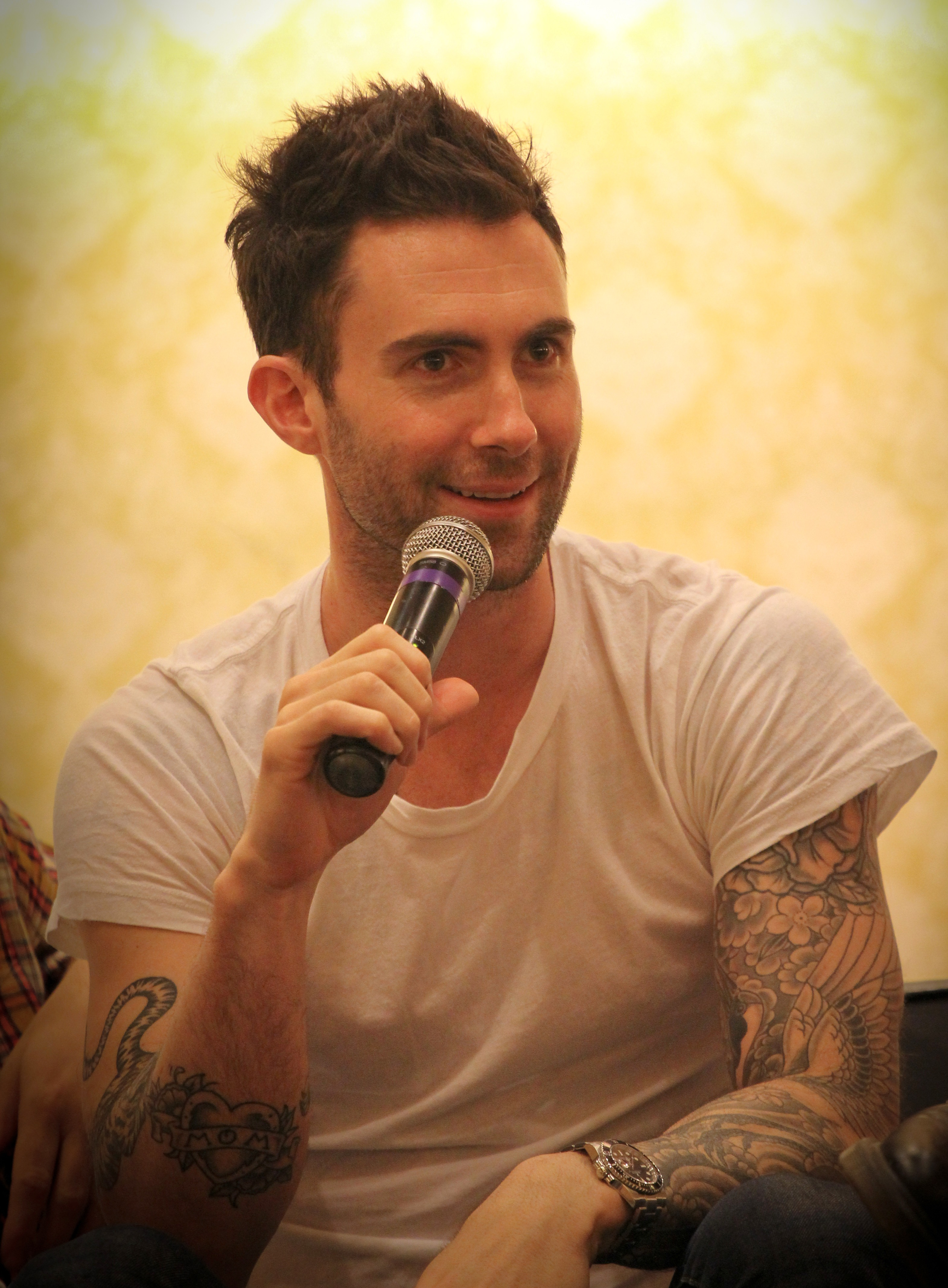
Adam Levine

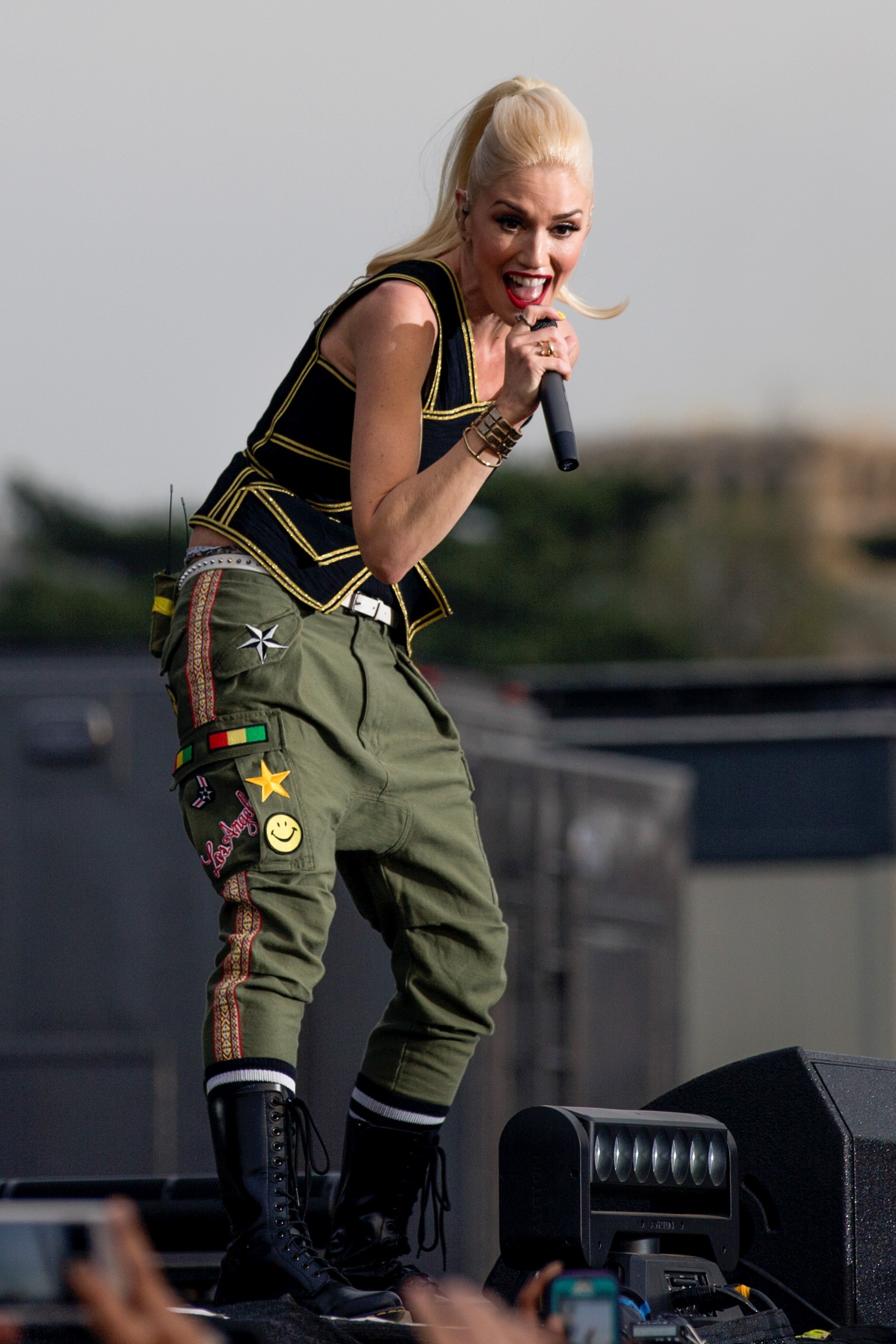
Gwen Stefani

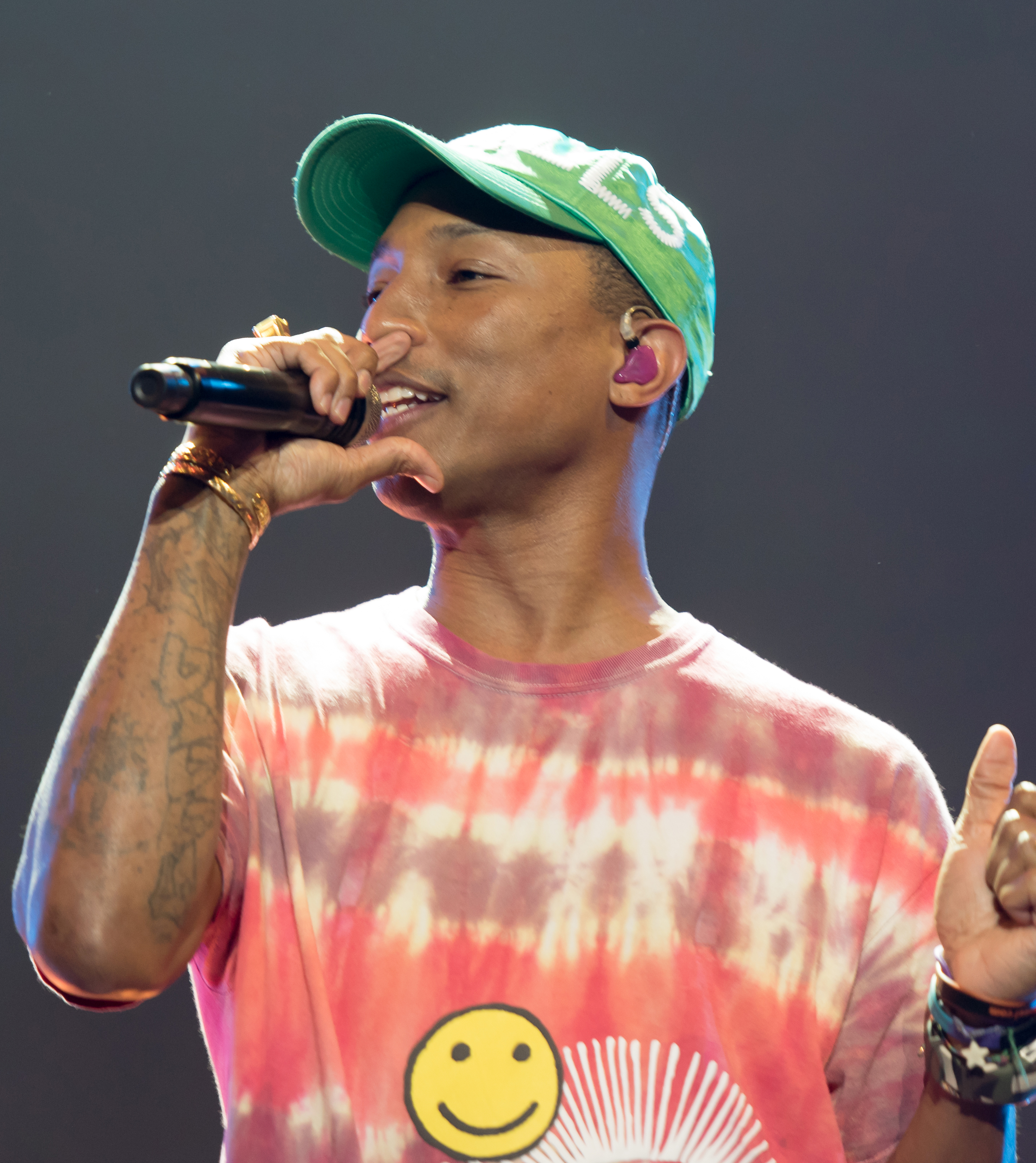
Pharrell Williams

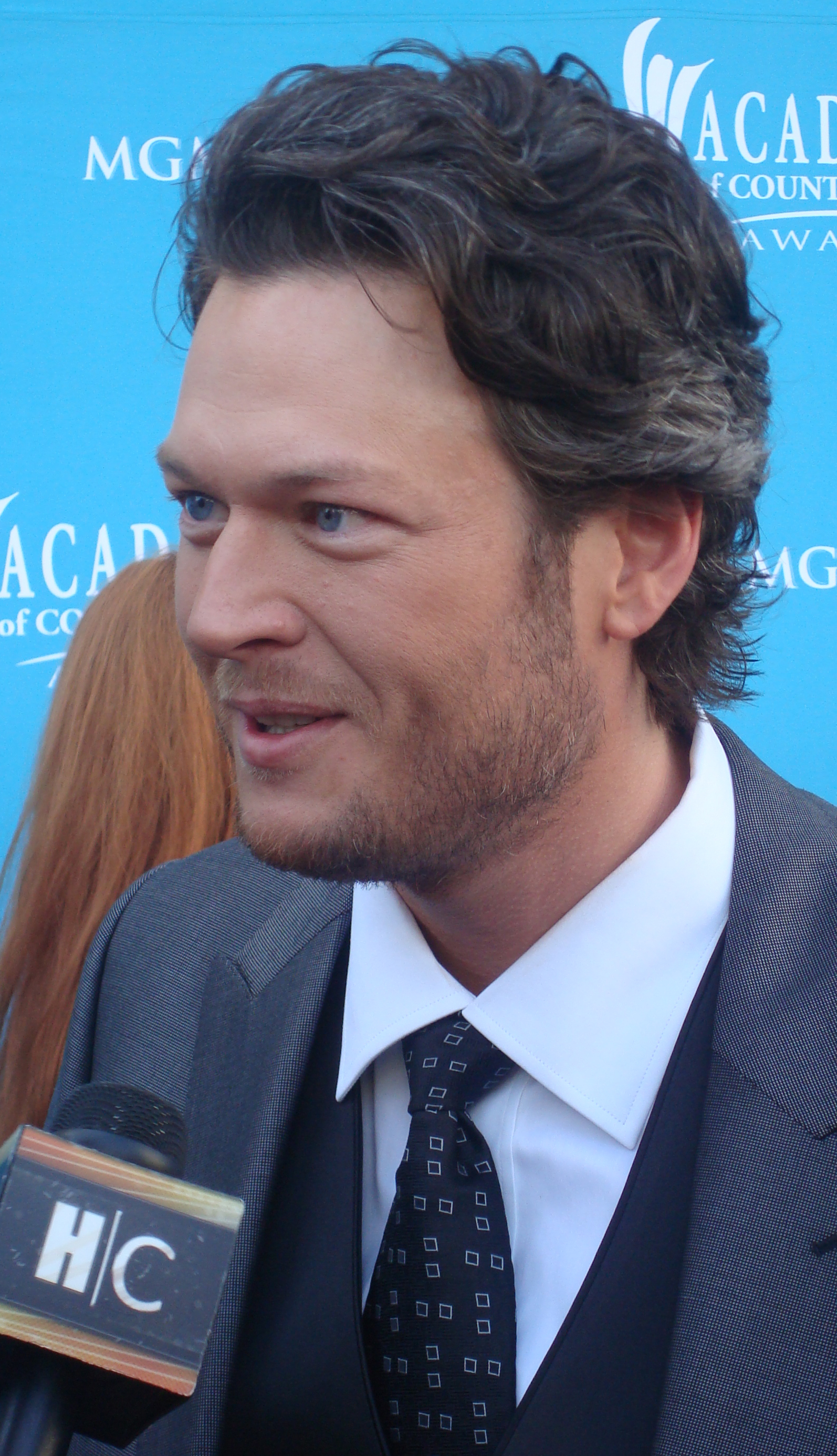
Blake Shelton

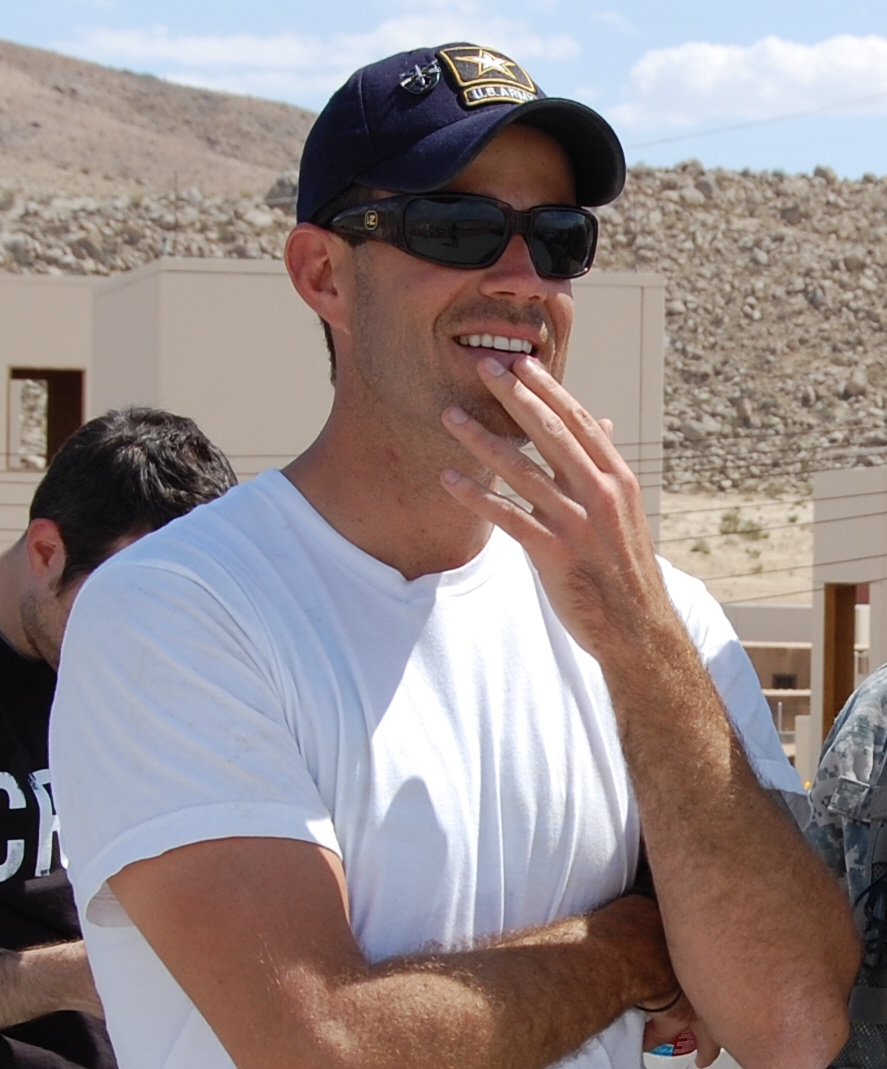
Carson Daly

== Teams ==
Color key

- Winner
- Runner-up
- Third place
- Fourth place
- Eliminated in the Live shows
- Eliminated in the Live playoffs
- Stolen in the Knockouts
- Eliminated in the Knockouts
- Stolen in the Battles
- Eliminated in the Battles

Coaches	Top 48 artists				
Adam Levine					
Adam Levine	Matt McAndrew	Chris Jamison	Damien	Mia Pfirrman	Taylor Phelan
Adam Levine	Alessandra Castronovo	Toia Jones	Blessing Offor	Rebekah Samarin	~~Beth Spangler~~
Adam Levine	Ethan Butler	Kelli Douglas	Clara Hong	Joe Kirk	Jonathan Wyndham
Gwen Stefani					
Gwen Stefani	Taylor John Williams	Ryan Sill	Anita Antoinette	Ricky Manning	Bryana Salaz
Gwen Stefani	~~Craig Wayne Boyd~~	~~Sugar Joans~~	Troy Ritchie	Beth Spangler	~~Jean Kelley~~
Gwen Stefani	~~Jessie Pitts~~	~~Menlik Zergabachew~~	Mayra Alvarez	Amanda Lee Peers	Gianna Salvato
Pharrell Williams					
Pharrell Williams	DaNica Shirey	Luke Wade	Sugar Joans	Jean Kelley	Elyjuh René
Pharrell Williams	~~Ricky Manning~~	~~Taylor Phelan~~	Katriz Trinidad	Menlik Zergabachew	~~Blessing Offor~~
Pharrell Williams	~~Daniel Griffin~~	~~Toia Jones~~	Brittany Butler	Jordy Searcy	Maiya Sykes
Blake Shelton					
Blake Shelton	Craig Wayne Boyd	Reagan James	Jessie Pitts	Taylor Brashears	James David Carter
Blake Shelton	Allison Bray	Grant Ganzer	Griffin	Tanner Linford	~~Craig Wayne Boyd~~
Blake Shelton	Fernanda Bosch	Bree Fondacaro	Justin Johnes	John Martin	Kensington Moore
Note: Italicized names are stolen contestants (names struck through within former teams).

== Blind auditions ==
The Blind Auditions were taped on June 7–8, 2014. The first episode of the Blind Auditions premiered on September 22, 2014.

Color key

✔	Coach hit his/her "I WANT YOU" button
	Artist defaulted to this coach's team
	Artist selected to join this coach's team
	Artist eliminated with no coach pressing his or her "I WANT YOU" button

=== Episode 1 (Sept. 22) ===
The four coaches performed "Hella Good" at the start of the show.

Order	Artist	Age	Hometown	Song	Coach's and contestant's choices			
Order	Artist	Age	Hometown	Song	Adam	Gwen	Pharrell	Blake
1	Luke Wade	31	Dublin, Texas	"That's How Strong My Love Is"	✔	✔	✔	✔
2	Clara Hong	22	Atlanta, Georgia	"Chuck E's in Love"	✔	✔	✔	—
3	Bryana Salaz	16	San Antonio, Texas	"Problem"	✔	✔	—	✔
4	Dennis Bell	52	Mansfield, Louisiana	"She Used to Be Mine"	—	—	—	—
5	Damien	35	Monroe, Louisiana	"It's So Hard to Say Goodbye to Yesterday"	✔	✔	✔	✔
6	Allison Bray	18	Louisville, Kentucky	"Merry Go 'Round"	✔	✔	—	✔
7	MEGG	23	Redondo Beach, California	"Celebrity Skin"	—	—	—	—
8	Taylor John Williams	23	Portland, Oregon	"Heartless"	✔	✔	—	—
9	Elyjuh René	18	Long Beach, California	"XO"	✔	—	✔	—
10	Bianca Espinal	21	New York City, New York	"Foolish Games"	—	—	—	—
11	James David Carter	34	Atlanta, Georgia	"Nobody Knows"	✔	✔	✔	✔

=== Episode 2 (Sept. 23) ===
Order	Artist	Age	Hometown	Song	Coach's and contestant's choices			
Order	Artist	Age	Hometown	Song	Adam	Gwen	Pharrell	Blake
1	DaNica Shirey	25	York, Pennsylvania	"Big White Room"	✔	✔	✔	—
2	Joe Kirk	17	Nashville, Tennessee	"Lego House"	✔	✔	✔	✔
3	Menlik Zergabachew	19	Silver Spring, Maryland	"Santeria"	—	✔	—	✔
4	Jimi Milligan	35	Philadelphia, Pennsylvania	"Get Ready"	—	—	—	—
5	Reagan James	15	Burleson, Texas	"Give Me Love"	—	✔	—	✔
6	Taylor Phelan	25	Sherman, Texas	"Sweater Weather"	✔	✔	✔	✔
7	Caitlin Lucia	18	Huntington Beach, California	"You're the One That I Want"	—	—	—	—
8	Sugar Joans	24	Los Angeles, California	"Chain of Fools"	—	✔	—	✔
9	Taylor Brashears	21	Nashville, Tennessee	"You Ain't Woman Enough"	✔	—	✔	✔
10	Andy Cherry	28	Charlotte, North Carolina	"Everybody Wants to Rule the World"	—	—	—	—
11	Maiya Sykes	36	Los Angeles, California	"Stay with Me"	✔	✔	✔	✔

=== Episode 3 (Sept. 29) ===
Order	Artist	Age	Hometown	Song	Coach's and contestant's choices			
Order	Artist	Age	Hometown	Song	Adam	Gwen	Pharrell	Blake
1	John Martin	25	Chicago, Illinois	"Sweet Pea"	—	✔	✔	✔
2	Jessie Pitts	18	Birmingham, Alabama	"The Story"	—	✔	—	✔
3	Michael Stein	62	Los Angeles, California	"The Devil Went Down to Georgia"	—	—	—	—
4	Ricky Manning	19	Cape Coral, Florida	"Love Me Again"	—	—	✔	✔
5	Mistee Meritt	N/A	Detroit, Michigan	"You Gotta Be"	—	—	—	—
6	Jeremy Cole	N/A	Wilmington, Delaware	"I Can Dream About You"	—	—	—	—
7	Samantha Sampson	17	Watertown, New York	"Heads Carolina, Tails California"	—	—	—	—
8	Kelli Douglas	31	Dallas, Texas	"Danny's Song"	✔	✔	—	✔
9	Blessing Offor	25	New York, New York	"Just the Two of Us"	✔	✔	✔	✔
10	Troy Ritchie	21	Trabuco Canyon, California	"Out of My League"	—	✔	—	—
11	Cole Wilkinson	16	Southlake, Texas	"Classic"	—	—	—	—
12	Mia Pfirrman	19	Temple City, California	"Unconditionally"	✔	✔	✔	✔
13	Alessandra Castronovo	21	Millstone, New Jersey	"When Love Takes Over"	✔	—	—	✔
14	Jordy Searcy	20	Fairhope, Alabama	"Skinny Love"	—	✔	✔	✔
15	Kensington Moore	16	Campbellsville, Kentucky	"Love Runs Out"	—	—	—	✔
16	Bree Fondacaro	24	Orange, California	"It Ain't Me Babe"	—	—	—	✔
17	Anita Antoinette	24	Boston, Massachusetts / Kingston, Jamaica	"Turn Your Lights Down Low"	✔	✔	✔	✔

=== Episode 4 (Sept. 30) ===
Order	Artist	Age	Hometown	Song	Coach's and contestant's choices			
Order	Artist	Age	Hometown	Song	Adam	Gwen	Pharrell	Blake
1	Katriz Trinidad	15	San Diego, California	"At Last"	—	✔	✔	✔
2	Ethan Butler	25	Chicago, Illinois	"Beneath Your Beautiful"	✔	—	—	✔
3	Tanner Linford	17	Kaysville, Utah	"When You Say Nothing at All"	—	—	—	✔
4	Roem Baur	37	San Francisco, California	"Oh, Pretty Woman"	—	—	—	—
5	Jean Kelley	29	Atlanta, Georgia	"Already Gone"	—	✔	—	✔
6	Chris Jamison	20	Pittsburgh, Pennsylvania	"Gravity"	✔	✔	✔	✔
7	Craig Wayne Boyd	35	Nashville, Tennessee	"The Whiskey Ain't Workin'"	—	—	✔	✔
8	Tini Grey	38	Apia, Samoa	"Sara Smile"	—	—	—	—
9	Jerome Johnson	28	Columbia, South Carolina	"Un-Break My Heart"	—	—	—	—
10	Sydney Cubit	18	Lexington, Kentucky	"Somewhere Only We Know"	—	—	—	—
11	Aaron Pfeiffer	25	Harlem, New York	"Don't You Worry Child"	—	—	—	—
12	Toia Jones	29	Montgomery, Alabama	"One and Only"	✔	—	✔	—
13	Amanda Lee Peers	29	Rochester, New York	"Put the Gun Down"	—	✔	—	—
14	Gianna Salvato	18	Freehold, New Jersey	"Glitter in the Air"	—	✔	—	—
15	Rebekah Samarin	20	Murrieta, California	"A Case of You"	✔	✔	—	—
16	Grant Ganzer	16	Johnston, Iowa	"Unaware"	—	—	—	✔
17	Jonathan Wyndham	22	Lexington, South Carolina	"Say Something"	✔	✔	✔	✔

=== Episode 5 (Oct. 6) ===
Order	Artist	Age	Hometown	Song	Coach's and contestant's choices			
Order	Artist	Age	Hometown	Song	Adam	Gwen	Pharrell	Blake
1	Matt McAndrew	23	Philadelphia, Pennsylvania	"A Thousand Years"	✔	—	✔	✔
2	Brittany Butler	21	Boston, Massachusetts	"The Girl from Ipanema"	—	✔	✔	—
3	Evan Watson	29	Fishkill, New York	"The Night They Drove Old Dixie Down"	—	—	—	—
4	Ryan Sill	20	Sterling, Virginia	"Secrets"	—	✔	—	✔
5	Fernanda Bosch	17	Miami, Florida	"I Try"	—	✔	—	✔
6	Beth Spangler	30	Aiken, South Carolina	"Best Thing I Never Had"	✔	✔	✔	✔
7	Erin Kim	24	Los Angeles, California	"Latch"	Team full	—	—	—
8	Griffin (Daniel Griffin)	23	Greenville, South Carolina	"It's a Beautiful Day"	Team full	✔	✔	✔
9	Chandra Knudsen	21	Harlan, Iowa	"Hard to Love"	Team full	—	Team full	—
10	Mayra Alvarez	26	La Porte, Texas	"Human Nature"	Team full	✔	Team full	✔
11	Luke Niccoli	N/A	Phoenix, Arizona	"Sing"	Team full	Team full	Team full	—
12	Nikki Rene	N/A	Ponte Vedra Beach, Florida	"Something to Talk About"	Team full	Team full	Team full	—
13	Bradley McKee	N/A	Athens, Georgia	"Me and My Broken Heart"	Team full	Team full	Team full	—
14	Justin Johnes	15	Massapequa, New York	"Let Her Go"	Team full	Team full	Team full	✔

== The Battles ==
The Battles (episodes 7 to 12) consisted of two two-hour episodes and two one-hour episodes each on October 13, 14, 20 and 21, 2014. Season seven's advisors are Stevie Nicks for Team Adam, Alicia Keys for Team Pharrell, Gavin Rossdale for Team Gwen and Little Big Town members Phillip Sweet, Kimberly Schlapman-Roads, Jimi Westbrook and Karen Fairchild for Team Blake.

Color key:

Artist won the Battle and advanced to the Knockouts
Artist lost the Battle but was stolen by another coach and advanced to the Knockouts
Artist lost the Battle and was eliminated

Episode	Coach	Order	Winner	Song	Loser	'Steal' result			
Episode	Coach	Order	Winner	Song	Loser	Adam	Gwen	Pharrell	Blake
Episode 7^{1} (Monday, Oct 13, 2014)	Pharrell Williams	1	Elyjuh René	"If I Ain't Got You"	Maiya Sykes	—	—	—N/a	—
Episode 7^{1} (Monday, Oct 13, 2014)	Adam Levine	2	Chris Jamison	"Young Girls"	Jonathan Wyndham	—N/a	—	—	—
Episode 7^{1} (Monday, Oct 13, 2014)	Gwen Stefani	3	Sugar Joans	"Survivor"	Jean Kelley	✔	—N/a	✔	—
Episode 7^{1} (Monday, Oct 13, 2014)	Blake Shelton	4	James David Carter	"Wave on Wave"	Craig Wayne Boyd	—	✔	—	—N/a
Episode 7^{1} (Monday, Oct 13, 2014)	Gwen Stefani	5	Taylor John Williams	"Jolene"	Amanda Lee Peers	—	—N/a	—	—
Episode 7^{1} (Monday, Oct 13, 2014)	Pharrell Williams	6	Luke Wade	"Maybe I'm Amazed"	Griffin	—	✔	—N/a	✔
Episode 8^{2} (Tuesday, Oct 14, 2014)	Pharrell Williams	1	Taylor Phelan	"Breakeven"	Jordy Searcy	—	—	—N/a	—
Episode 8^{2} (Tuesday, Oct 14, 2014)	Adam Levine	2	Alessandra Castronovo	"Stay"	Joe Kirk	—N/a	—	—	—
Episode 8^{2} (Tuesday, Oct 14, 2014)	Adam Levine	3	Rebekah Samarin	"Will You Love Me Tomorrow"	Clara Hong	—N/a	—	—	—
Episode 8^{2} (Tuesday, Oct 14, 2014)	Blake Shelton	4	Grant Ganzer	"Stop and Stare"	John Martin	—	—	—	—N/a
Episode 8^{2} (Tuesday, Oct 14, 2014)	Blake Shelton	5	Tanner Linford	"You & I"	Justin Johnes	—	—	—	—N/a
Episode 8^{2} (Tuesday, Oct 14, 2014)	Gwen Stefani	6	Troy Ritchie	"Maneater"	Menlik Zergabachew	✔	—N/a	✔	—
Episode 9^{1} (Monday, Oct 20, 2014)	Adam Levine	1	Damien	"Knock on Wood"	Kelli Douglas	—N/a	—	Team full	—
Episode 9^{1} (Monday, Oct 20, 2014)	Gwen Stefani	2	Ryan Sill	"I Need Your Love"	Jessie Pitts	—	—N/a	Team full	✔
Episode 9^{1} (Monday, Oct 20, 2014)	Pharrell Williams	3	Katriz Trinidad	"Do I Do"	Blessing Offor	✔	✔	Team full	Team full
Episode 9^{1} (Monday, Oct 20, 2014)	Adam Levine	4	Matt McAndrew	"Yellow"	Ethan Butler	—N/a	—	Team full	Team full
Episode 9^{1} (Monday, Oct 20, 2014)	Blake Shelton	5	Taylor Brashears	"You're No Good"	Bree Fondacaro	—	—	Team full	Team full
Episode 9^{1} (Monday, Oct 20, 2014)	Pharrell Williams	6	DaNica Shirey	"Halo"	Toia Jones	✔	✔	Team full	Team full
Episode 10^{2} (Tuesday, Oct 21, 2014)	Pharrell Williams	1	Ricky Manning	"On Broadway"	Brittany Butler	Team full	—	Team full	Team full
Episode 10^{2} (Tuesday, Oct 21, 2014)	Blake Shelton	2	Reagan James	"Team"	Kensington Moore	Team full	—	Team full	Team full
Episode 10^{2} (Tuesday, Oct 21, 2014)	Blake Shelton	3	Allison Bray	"Sparks Fly"	Fernanda Bosch	Team full	—	Team full	Team full
Episode 10^{2} (Tuesday, Oct 21, 2014)	Gwen Stefani	4	Anita Antoinette	"I Can See Clearly Now"	Mayra Alvarez	Team full	—N/a	Team full	Team full
Episode 10^{2} (Tuesday, Oct 21, 2014)	Gwen Stefani	5	Bryana Salaz	"Boom Clap"	Gianna Salvato	Team full	—N/a	Team full	Team full
Episode 10^{2} (Tuesday, Oct 21, 2014)	Adam Levine	6	Mia Pfirrman	"I Turn to You"	Beth Spangler	Team full	✔	Team full	Team full

^1 Episodes airing on Monday had a running time of two hours.
^2 Episodes airing on Tuesday & Sunday had a running time of one hour.

== The Knockouts ==
The knockouts returned as a stage after being absent on the previous season. For the knockouts, Taylor Swift was assigned as a mentor for contestants on all four teams for this round.

Color key:

Artist won the Knockout and advanced to the Live Shows
Artist lost the Knockout but was stolen by another coach and advanced to the Live Shows
Artist lost the Knockout and was eliminated

Episode	Coach	Order	Song	Artists		Song	'Steal' result			
Episode	Coach	Order	Song	Winner	Loser	Song	Adam	Gwen	Pharrell	Blake
Episode 11^{1} (Monday, Oct 27, 2014)	Gwen Stefani	1	"Heart Attack"	Bryana Salaz	Sugar Joans	"Love on Top"	—	—N/a	✔	—
Episode 11^{1} (Monday, Oct 27, 2014)	Blake Shelton	2	"You've Got a Friend"	James David Carter	Griffin	"As Long as You Love Me"	—	—	Team full	—N/a
Episode 11^{1} (Monday, Oct 27, 2014)	Pharrell Williams	3	"Saving All My Love for You"	DaNica Shirey	Katriz Trinidad	"Superwoman"	—	—	Team full	—
Episode 11^{1} (Monday, Oct 27, 2014)	Adam Levine	4	"How Do I Live"	Damien	Toia Jones	"Crazy in Love"	—N/a	—	Team full	—
Episode 11^{1} (Monday, Oct 27, 2014)	Blake Shelton	5	"Your Song"	Jessie Pitts	Tanner Linford	"Calling All Angels"	—	—	Team full	—N/a
Episode 11^{1} (Monday, Oct 27, 2014)	Pharrell Williams	6	"Rich Girl"	Luke Wade	Taylor Phelan	"Rather Be"	✔	✔	Team full	✔
Episode 12^{2} (Tuesday, Oct 28, 2014)	Gwen Stefani	1	"Mad World"	Taylor John Williams	Troy Ritchie	"Hey Ya!"	Team full	—N/a	Team full	—
Episode 12^{2} (Tuesday, Oct 28, 2014)	Adam Levine	2	"Human"	Mia Pfirrman	Alessandra Castronovo	"Next To Me"	Team full	—	Team full	—
Episode 12^{2} (Tuesday, Oct 28, 2014)	Pharrell Williams	3	"With You"	Elyjuh René	Ricky Manning	"Wrecking Ball"	Team full	✔	Team full	—
Episode 13^{1} (Monday, Nov 3, 2014)	Blake Shelton	1	"Landslide"	Taylor Brashears	Allison Bray	"Sin Wagon"	Team full	Team full	Team full	—N/a
Episode 13^{1} (Monday, Nov 3, 2014)	Gwen Stefani	2	"Miss Independent"	Ryan Sill	Beth Spangler	"Too Little Too Late"	Team full	Team full	Team full	—
Episode 13^{1} (Monday, Nov 3, 2014)	Pharrell Williams	3	"Chandelier"	Jean Kelley	Menlik Zergabachew	"Could You Be Loved"	Team full	Team full	Team full	—
Episode 13^{1} (Monday, Nov 3, 2014)	Adam Levine	4	"(Sittin' On) The Dock of the Bay"	Chris Jamison	Blessing Offor	"Your Body Is a Wonderland"	Team full	Team full	Team full	—
Episode 13^{1} (Monday, Nov 3, 2014)	Adam Levine	5	"Drops of Jupiter"	Matt McAndrew	Rebekah Samarin	"You Give Me Something"	Team full	Team full	Team full	—
Episode 13^{1} (Monday, Nov 3, 2014)	Blake Shelton	6	"Hit 'Em Up Style (Oops!)"	Reagan James	Grant Ganzer	"Apologize"	Team full	Team full	Team full	—N/a
Episode 13^{1} (Monday, Nov 3, 2014)	Gwen Stefani	7	"Rude"	Anita Antoinette	Craig Wayne Boyd	"Can't You See"	Team full	Team full	Team full	✔
Episode 14^{2} (Tuesday, Nov 4, 2014)	The fourteenth was a special one hour episode titled "The Road to the Live Shows." This episode shows the best moments of the season so far, including the blind auditions, the journey of the top 20 contestants and unseen footage.									

^1 Episodes airing on Monday had a running time of two hours.
^2 Episodes airing on Tuesday had a running time of one hour.

== Live shows ==
Color key:

Artist was saved by the Public's votes
Artist was saved by his/her coach or was placed in the bottom three
Artist was saved by the Instant Save
Artist's iTunes vote multiplied by 10 after his/her studio version of the song reached iTunes top 10
Artist was eliminated

=== Week 1: Live playoffs (Nov. 10, 11, & 12) ===
The Live Playoffs consisted of three episodes, where 20 artists perform for 12 places in the live shows. The two artists per each team advances via public vote, while the bottom three artists compete for the coaches' save in the results show.

The iTunes bonus multiplier returns for the live rounds, restored to its original factor of 10, though with the continuing iTunes voting limitations were established in season six. Teams Adam and Blake performed on Monday night, followed by Teams Gwen and Pharrell on Tuesday.

Episode	Coach	Order	Artist	Song	Result
Episode 15 (Monday, Nov 10, 2014)	Blake Shelton	1	Taylor Brashears	"Long Time Gone"	Eliminated
Episode 15 (Monday, Nov 10, 2014)	Adam Levine	2	Chris Jamison	"Don't"	Adam's choice
Episode 15 (Monday, Nov 10, 2014)	Blake Shelton	3	Jessie Pitts	"Holding Out for a Hero"	Blake's choice
Episode 15 (Monday, Nov 10, 2014)	Blake Shelton	4	James David Carter	"Two of a Kind, Workin' on a Full House"	Eliminated
Episode 15 (Monday, Nov 10, 2014)	Adam Levine	5	Matt McAndrew	"God Only Knows"	Public's vote
Episode 15 (Monday, Nov 10, 2014)	Blake Shelton	6	Reagan James	"Try"	Public's vote
Episode 15 (Monday, Nov 10, 2014)	Adam Levine	7	Taylor Phelan	"Cool Kids"	Eliminated
Episode 15 (Monday, Nov 10, 2014)	Adam Levine	8	Mia Pfirrman	"Young and Beautiful"	Eliminated
Episode 15 (Monday, Nov 10, 2014)	Adam Levine	9	Damien	"I'm Not the Only One"	Public's vote
Episode 15 (Monday, Nov 10, 2014)	Blake Shelton	10	Craig Wayne Boyd	"Some Kind of Wonderful"	Public's vote
Episode 16 (Tuesday, Nov 11, 2014)	Gwen Stefani	1	Ryan Sill	"I Lived"	Gwen's choice
Episode 16 (Tuesday, Nov 11, 2014)	Pharrell Williams	2	Jean Kelley	"Piano in the Dark"	Eliminated
Episode 16 (Tuesday, Nov 11, 2014)	Pharrell Williams	3	Elyjuh René	"Latch"	Eliminated
Episode 16 (Tuesday, Nov 11, 2014)	Gwen Stefani	4	Bryana Salaz	"Amnesia"	Eliminated
Episode 16 (Tuesday, Nov 11, 2014)	Pharrell Williams	5	Luke Wade	"Let's Get It On"	Public's vote
Episode 16 (Tuesday, Nov 11, 2014)	Gwen Stefani	6	Anita Antoinette	"All About That Bass"	Public's vote
Episode 16 (Tuesday, Nov 11, 2014)	Pharrell Williams	7	DaNica Shirey	"Help Me"	Public's vote
Episode 16 (Tuesday, Nov 11, 2014)	Pharrell Williams	8	Sugar Joans	"I Say a Little Prayer"	Pharrell's choice
Episode 16 (Tuesday, Nov 11, 2014)	Gwen Stefani	9	Ricky Manning	"Lay Me Down"	Eliminated
Episode 16 (Tuesday, Nov 11, 2014)	Gwen Stefani	10	Taylor John Williams	"Stuck in the Middle with You"	Public's vote

Non-competition performances
Order	Performer	Song
15	Maroon 5	"Animals"
16	Pharrell Williams	"Hunter"
17.1	Team Blake; Craig Wayne Boyd, James David Carter, Jessie Pitts, Reagan James, Taylor Brashears	"Life in a Northern Town"
17.2	Team Pharrell; DaNica Shirey, Elyjuh René, Jean Kelley, Luke Wade, Sugar Joans	"Money on My Mind"
17.3	Team Gwen; Anita Antoinette, Bryana Salaz, Ricky Manning, Ryan Sill, Taylor John Williams	"Riptide"
17.4	Team Adam; Chris Jamison, Damien, Matt McAndrew, Mia Pfirrman, Taylor Phelan	"Am I Wrong"

=== Week 2: Top 12 (Nov. 17 & 18) ===
The Top 12 performed on Monday, November 17, 2014, with the results following on Tuesday, November 18, 2014. The Instant Save returned once again this season, with the bottom three artists performing for a spot in the next round via the viewers' votes from Twitter, which is applicable until the quarterfinals. In a new twist, a Wild Card finalist round was announced during the results show where previously eliminated contestants from the season's top twelve will return to compete in a sing-off for a fourth spot in the finals.

iTunes multiplier bonus was awarded to Matt McAndrew (#5).

Order	Coach	Artist	Song	Result
1	Pharrell Williams	Sugar Joans	"Take Me to the River"	Bottom three
2	Gwen Stefani	Ryan Sill	"Ordinary World"	Bottom three
3	Blake Shelton	Jessie Pitts	"Don't You Worry Child"	Bottom three
4	Adam Levine	Damien	"He Ain't Heavy, He's My Brother"	Public's vote
5	Pharrell Williams	DaNica Shirey	"Creep"	Public's vote
6	Gwen Stefani	Taylor John Williams	"If"	Public's vote
7	Blake Shelton	Reagan James	"It Ain't Over 'Til It's Over"	Public's vote
8	Pharrell Williams	Luke Wade	"Thinking Out Loud"	Public's vote
9	Adam Levine	Matt McAndrew	"Take Me to Church"	Public's vote
10	Blake Shelton	Craig Wayne Boyd	"You Look So Good in Love"	Public's vote
11	Adam Levine	Chris Jamison	"Jealous"	Public's vote
12	Gwen Stefani	Anita Antoinette	"Redemption Song"	Public's vote
Instant Save performances
1	Blake Shelton	Jessie Pitts	"Gravity"	Eliminated
2	Pharrell Williams	Sugar Joans	"I Wanna Dance with Somebody"	Eliminated
3	Gwen Stefani	Ryan Sill	"More Than Words"	Instant Save

Non-competition performances
Order	Performer	Song
19.1	Gwen Stefani & her team (Anita Antoinette, Ryan Sill, and Taylor John Williams)	"The Tide Is High"
19.2	Ella Henderson	"Ghost"
19.3	Blake Shelton & his team (Craig Wayne Boyd, Jessie Pitts, and Reagan James)	"Sad Songs (Say So Much)"

=== Week 3: Top 10 (Nov. 24 & 25) ===
The Top 10 performed on Monday, November 24, 2014, with the results following on Tuesday, November 25, 2014. This time, the coaches chose the song for their artist.

The performance show was suspended in the Eastern and Central time zones for approximately a half hour at 9 p.m. ET due to the grand jury decision resulting from the shooting of Michael Brown by police in Ferguson, Missouri (and the unrest that followed). When NBC News coverage ended, the program resumed from the point at which it had been suspended. Viewers in the Mountain time zone saw the live coverage at 7 p.m., when the episode was supposed to start, then the performance show was shown on a delay; however, the part announcing the start of the NBC News special report was edited out as the show aired in real time. The episodes aired without any interruption for Pacific time zone, and in the states of Alaska and Hawaii.

iTunes multiplier bonus was awarded to Craig Wayne Boyd (#6).

Order	Coach	Artist	Song	Result
1	Adam Levine	Matt McAndrew	"Fix You"	Public's vote
2	Gwen Stefani	Anita Antoinette	"Let Her Go"	Bottom three
3	Adam Levine	Damien	"You and I"	Public's vote
4	Blake Shelton	Reagan James	"Fancy"	Bottom three
5	Pharrell Williams	Luke Wade	"Try a Little Tenderness"	Public's vote
6	Blake Shelton	Craig Wayne Boyd	"I Walk the Line"	Public's vote
7	Gwen Stefani	Ryan Sill	"Starlight"	Bottom three
8	Pharrell Williams	DaNica Shirey	"I Have Nothing"	Public's vote
9	Gwen Stefani	Taylor John Williams	"Come Together"	Public's vote
10	Adam Levine	Chris Jamison	"Uptown Funk"	Public's vote
Instant Save performances
1	Blake Shelton	Reagan James	"I'm Like a Bird"	Eliminated
2	Gwen Stefani	Anita Antoinette	"The Remedy (I Won't Worry)"	Eliminated
3	Gwen Stefani	Ryan Sill	"Collide"	Instant Save

Non-competition performances
Order	Performer	Song
20.1	Top 10	"Bless The Broken Road"/"Stand"
21.1	Adam Levine & his team (Chris Jamison, Damien and Matt McAndrew)	"Only the Good Die Young"
21.2	Pharrell Williams & his team (DaNica Shirey and Luke Wade)	"What a Wonderful World"
21.3	Taylor Swift	"Blank Space"

=== Week 4: Quarterfinals (Dec. 1 & 2) ===
The Top 8 performed on Monday, December 1, 2014, with the results following on Tuesday, December 2, 2014. Three artists were eliminated this week with the bottom half of the artists facing the Instant Save.

iTunes bonus multipliers were awarded to Matt McAndrew (#2), Taylor John Williams (#6), and Damien (#7).

With the eliminations of Luke Wade and DaNica Shirey, Williams no longer has any contestants remaining on his team; for the first time in the show's history, the top 5 were all male artists.

Order	Coach	Artist	Song	Result
1	Gwen Stefani	Ryan Sill	"Open Arms"	Bottom four
2	Blake Shelton	Craig Wayne Boyd	"Take It Easy"	Public's vote
3	Pharrell Williams	DaNica Shirey	"These Dreams"	Bottom four
4	Adam Levine	Damien	"Someone Like You"	Public's vote
5	Adam Levine	Chris Jamison	"Sexual Healing"	Bottom four
6	Pharrell Williams	Luke Wade	"Holding Back the Years"	Bottom four
7	Gwen Stefani	Taylor John Williams	"Royals"	Public's vote
8	Adam Levine	Matt McAndrew	"The Blower's Daughter"	Public's vote
Instant Save performances
1	Pharrell Williams	DaNica Shirey	"I'd Rather Go Blind"	Eliminated
2	Pharrell Williams	Luke Wade	"Stand by Me"	Eliminated
3	Gwen Stefani	Ryan Sill	"Heaven"	Eliminated
4	Adam Levine	Chris Jamison	"Georgia on My Mind"	Instant Save

Non-competition performances
Order	Performer	Song
22.1	Top 8	"Geronimo"
22.2	Nick Jonas & the Top 8	"Jealous"
22.3	Gwen Stefani & Pharrell Williams	"Spark the Fire"
23.1	Christina Grimmie	"With Love"
23.2	RaeLynn	"God Made Girls"

=== Week 5: Semifinals & Wildcard Round (Dec. 8 & 9) ===
The Top 5 performed on Monday, December 8, 2014, with the results following on Tuesday, December 9, 2014. This week, each artist will sing two songs; one chosen by their coach, and another selected in tribute to their supporters. The Wildcard Round was held on Tuesday, and nine previously eliminated singers from the season's top 12 were given the opportunity to perform once again, with one contestant awarded a fourth spot in the finale. With the special Tuesday round, the voting window for all methods was shortened to six hours to accommodate announcement of the result during the December 10 Today show; additionally, as with the finale, iTunes bonus multipliers do not apply to the Wildcard voting.

Craig Wayne Boyd, Matt McAndrew, Chris Jamison and Taylor John Williams received the iTunes bonus multiplier with their studio recordings of "The Old Rugged Cross", "Make It Rain", "When I Was Your Man" and "Sugar" charting at #2, #5, #6 and #10 on the iTunes Top 200 singles chart at the close of the voting window, respectively.

With the elimination of Taylor John Williams, Stefani no longer has any remaining artists on her team. This is the first time a single coach (Levine) has advanced three performers to the final stage of the competition, and this was also the first season with an all-male finale.

Wayne Boyd, McAndrew, and Jamison also recorded songs in the event that they were eliminated that night, which were respectively "Anymore" (Boyd), "Imagine" (McAndrew), and "I'll Be" (Jamison).

Order	Coach	Artist	Song (Coach's choice)	Order	Song (Contestant's choice)	Result
1	Adam Levine	Damien	"She's Out of My Life"	6	"I Don't Want to Wait"	Eliminated
2	Blake Shelton	Craig Wayne Boyd	"Workin' Man Blues"	8	"The Old Rugged Cross"	Public's vote
3	Gwen Stefani	Taylor John Williams	"Falling Slowly"	9	"Blank Space"	Eliminated
4	Adam Levine	Matt McAndrew	"Make It Rain"	7	"I Still Haven't Found What I'm Looking For"	Public's vote
5	Adam Levine	Chris Jamison	"Sugar"	10	"When I Was Your Man"	Public's vote
Wildcard performances
1	Blake Shelton	Reagan James	"Put Your Records On"			Eliminated
2	Blake Shelton	Jessie Pitts	"Zombie"			Eliminated
3	Gwen Stefani	Ryan Sill	"Marry Me"			Eliminated
4	Gwen Stefani	Anita Antoinette	"Waiting on the World to Change"			Eliminated
5	Gwen Stefani	Taylor John Williams	"Wicked Game"			Eliminated
6	Adam Levine	Damien	"Grenade"			Wild Card
7	Pharrell Williams	Sugar Joans	"Back to Black"			Eliminated
8	Pharrell Williams	Luke Wade	"Have a Little Faith in Me"			Eliminated
9	Pharrell Williams	DaNica Shirey	"Without You"			Eliminated

Non-competition performances
Order	Performer	Song
24.1	Blake Shelton & Ashley Monroe	"Lonely Tonight"

=== Week 6: Finale (Dec. 15 & 16) ===
The Top 4 will perform on Monday, December 15, 2014, with the final results following on Tuesday, December 16, 2014. This week, the final four performed an original song, a duet with the coach, and a solo song. As with previous seasons, there was no iTunes bonus multiplier applied to songs performed in the finale episodes; all iTunes votes received for the five weeks leading to the finale will be cumulatively added to online, phone and app finale votes for each finalist.

iTunes multiplier bonuses were awarded to McAndrew (#1 & #10), Wayne Boyd (#2), Jamison (#3 & #5) and Damien (#8).

With Boyd's victory, he is the second stolen artist to win an entire season, with Josh Kaufman being the first. He also has the distinction of being the only artist who have been stolen twice to win an entire season.

Coach	Artist	Order	Solo Song	Order	Original Song	Order	Duet Song	Result
Adam Levine	Damien	1	"A Song for You"	10	"Soldier"	6	"Don't Let the Sun Go Down On Me"	Fourth place
Blake Shelton	Craig Wayne Boyd	9	"In Pictures"	2	"My Baby's Got a Smile on Her Face"	5	"Boots On"	Winner
Adam Levine	Chris Jamison	11	"Cry Me a River"	7	"Velvet"	3	"Lost Without U"	Third Place
Adam Levine	Matt McAndrew	12	"Over the Rainbow"	4	"Wasted Love"	8	"Lost Stars"	Runner-Up

Non-competition performances
Order	Performer	Song
27.1	The Top 20	"Pompeii"
27.2	Craig Wayne Boyd (with DaNica Shirey, Sugar Joans and Taylor Brashears)	"Keep Your Hands to Yourself"
27.3	Hozier	"Take Me to Church"
27.4	Chris Jamison (with Luke Wade, Ricky Manning, Ryan Sill and Taylor Phelan)	"Dedication to My Ex (Miss That)"
27.5	Fall Out Boy and Matt McAndrew	"Centuries"
27.6	Bryana Salaz, DaNica Shirey, Jean Kelley, Mia Pfirrman, and Sugar Joans	"Bang Bang"
27.7	Mark Ronson featuring Bruno Mars	"Uptown Funk"
27.8	Lynyrd Skynyrd and Craig Wayne Boyd	"Sweet Home Alabama"
27.9	Meghan Trainor	"Lips Are Movin"
27.10	Jennifer Hudson and Damien	"It's Your World"
27.11	Ed Sheeran	"Thinking Out Loud"
27.12	Matt McAndrew (with Mia Pfirrman, Sugar Joans, Taylor John Williams and Taylor Phelan)	"Go Your Own Way"
27.13	Damien (with Anita Antoinette, DaNica Shirey and Elyjuh René)	"Ain't No Mountain High Enough"
27.14	Jessie J and Chris Jamison	"Masterpiece"
27.15	Adam, Blake, Gwen and Pharrell	"Have Yourself a Merry Little Christmas"
27.16	Craig Wayne Boyd (Winner)	"My Baby's Got a Smile on Her Face"

== Elimination chart ==
=== Overall ===
Color key
Artist's info

- Team Adam
- Team Gwen
- Team Pharrell
- Team Blake

Result details

- Winner
- Runner-up
- Third place
- Fourth Place
- Artist was eliminated
- Saved by Instant Save (via Twitter)
- Artist was saved by the public
- Artist was saved by his/her coach
- Artist was eliminated but won the Wildcard round
- Immune

Live show results per week
Artist	Week 1 Playoffs	Week 2	Week 3	Week 4	Week 5	Wildcard	Week 6 Finale
Craig Wayne Boyd	Safe	Safe	Safe	Safe	Safe	Immune	Winner
Matt McAndrew	Safe	Safe	Safe	Safe	Safe	Immune	Runner-up
Chris Jamison	Safe	Safe	Safe	Safe	Safe	Immune	3rd place
Damien	Safe	Safe	Safe	Safe	Eliminated	Safe	4th place
Taylor John Williams	Safe	Safe	Safe	Safe	Eliminated	Eliminated	Eliminated (Wildcard)
DaNica Shirey	Safe	Safe	Safe	Eliminated	Eliminated (Week 4)	Eliminated	Eliminated (Wildcard)
Luke Wade	Safe	Safe	Safe	Eliminated	Eliminated (Week 4)	Eliminated	Eliminated (Wildcard)
Ryan Sill	Safe	Safe	Safe	Eliminated	Eliminated (Week 4)	Eliminated	Eliminated (Wildcard)
Anita Antoinette	Safe	Safe	Eliminated	Eliminated (Week 3)		Eliminated	Eliminated (Wildcard)
Reagan James	Safe	Safe	Eliminated	Eliminated (Week 3)		Eliminated	Eliminated (Wildcard)
Jessie Pitts	Safe	Eliminated	Eliminated (Week 2)			Eliminated	Eliminated (Wildcard)
Sugar Joans	Safe	Eliminated	Eliminated (Week 2)			Eliminated	Eliminated (Wildcard)
James David Carter	Eliminated	Eliminated (Week 1)					
Taylor Brashears	Eliminated	Eliminated (Week 1)					
Jean Kelley	Eliminated	Eliminated (Week 1)					
Ricky Manning	Eliminated	Eliminated (Week 1)					
Mia Pfirrman	Eliminated	Eliminated (Week 1)					
Taylor Phelan	Eliminated	Eliminated (Week 1)					
Elyjuh René	Eliminated	Eliminated (Week 1)					
Bryana Salaz	Eliminated	Eliminated (Week 1)					

=== Teams ===
Color key
Artist's info

- Team Adam
- Team Gwen
- Team Pharrell
- Team Blake

Result details

- Winner
- Runner-up
- Third place
- Fourth Place
- Eliminated
- Artist Saved by Instant Save (via Twitter)
- Artist won the Wildcard round
- Artist received one or more iTunes bonus that week (applicable Weeks 1-5)
- Number of iTunes bonuses received
- Teams are in 3 artists
- No artists remaining on his/her team

Artist	Week 1 Playoffs	Week 2	Week 3	Week 4	Week 5	Week 6 Finale
Matt McAndrew	Public's vote	Advanced	Advanced	Advanced	Advanced	Runner-up
Chris Jamison	Coach's choice	Advanced	Advanced	Advanced	Advanced	Third place
Damien	Public's vote	Advanced	Advanced	Advanced	Advanced	Fourth place
Mia Pfirrman	Eliminated					
Taylor Phelan	Eliminated					
Taylor John Williams	Public's vote	Advanced	Advanced	Advanced	Eliminated	
Ryan Sill	Coach's choice	Advanced	Advanced	Eliminated		
Anita Antoinette	Public's vote	Advanced	Eliminated			
Ricky Manning	Eliminated					
Bryana Salaz	Eliminated					
DaNica Shirey	Public's vote	Advanced	Advanced	Eliminated		
Luke Wade	Public's vote	Advanced	Advanced	Eliminated		
Sugar Joans	Coach's choice	Eliminated				
Jean Kelley	Eliminated					
Elyjuh René	Eliminated					
Craig Wayne Boyd	Public's vote	Advanced	Advanced	Advanced	Advanced	Winner
Reagan James	Public's vote	Advanced	Eliminated			
Jessie Pitts	Coach's choice	Eliminated				
Taylor Brashears	Eliminated					
James David Carter	Eliminated					

Rank	Coach	Top 12	Top 10	Top 8	Top 5	Top 4
1	Blake Shelton	3	2	1	1	1
2	Adam Levine	3	3	3	3	3
3	Gwen Stefani	3	3	2	1	0
4	Pharrell Williams	3	2	2	0	0

== Performances by guests/coaches ==
Episode	Show segment	Performer(s)	Title	Reaction		Performance type	Source
Episode	Show segment	Performer(s)	Title	Hot 100	Hot digital	Performance type	Source
15	The Live Playoffs	Maroon 5	"Animals"	4 (-1)	4 (+1)	live performance	
16	The Live Playoffs	Pharrell Williams	"Hunter"	Did not chart	TBA	live performance	
19	Top 12 Results	Ella Henderson	"Ghost"	52 (+42)	16 (debut)	live performance	
21	Top 10 Results	Taylor Swift	"Blank Space"	1 (=)	1 (=)	live performance	
22	Top 8 Perform	Gwen Stefani & Pharrell Williams	"Spark the Fire"	Did not chart	TBA	live performance	
22	Top 8 Perform	Nick Jonas	"Jealous"	8 (+2)	7 (+2)	live performance	
23	Top 8 Results	RaeLynn	"God Made Girls"	61 (+25)	36 (debut)	live performance	
23	Top 8 Results	Christina Grimmie	"With Love"	Did not chart	TBA	live performance	
24	Semifinal Perform	Blake Shelton & Ashley Monroe	"Lonely Tonight"	95 (debut)	TBA	live performance	
26	Finale Results	Bruno Mars & Mark Ronson	"Uptown Funk"	3 (=)	1 (+2)	live performance	
26	Finale Results	Ed Sheeran	"Thinking Out Loud"	4 (+2)	4 (=)	live performance	
26	Finale Results	Jennifer Hudson (with Damien)	"It's Your World"	Did not Chart	Did not Chart	live performance	
26	Finale Results	Hozier	"Take Me to Church"	2 (=)	2 (=)	live performance	
26	Finale Results	Lynyrd Skynyrd (with Craig Wayne Boyd)	"Sweet Home Alabama"	Did not Chart	Did not Chart	live performance	
26	Finale Results	Meghan Trainor	"Lips Are Movin"	5 (-1)	6 (-1)	live performance	
26	Finale Results	Fall Out Boy (with Matt McAndrew)	"Centuries"	20 (+6)	10 (+7)	live performance	
26	Finale Results	Jessie J (with Chris Jamison)	"Masterpiece"	65 (debut)	22 (debut)	live performance	

== Reception ==
=== Ratings ===
The season seven premiere was watched by 12.95 million viewers with a 3.9 rating in the 18–49 demographic. It was down from last season's premiere by 2.91 million viewers.

Episode		Original airdate	Production	Time slot (ET)	Viewers (in millions)	Adults (18–49)		Source
Episode		Original airdate	Production	Time slot (ET)	Viewers (in millions)	Rating	Share	Source
1	"The Blind Auditions Premiere, Part 1"	September 22, 2014	701	Monday 8:00 p.m.	12.95	3.9	11	
2	"The Blind Auditions Premiere, Part 2"	September 23, 2014	702	Tuesday 8:00 p.m.	13.18	4.1	13	
3	"The Blind Auditions, Part 3"	September 29, 2014	703	Monday 8:00 p.m.	12.94	4.0	11	
4	"The Blind Auditions, Part 4"	September 30, 2014	704	Tuesday 8:00 p.m.	13.73	4.1	13	
5	"The Blind Auditions, Part 5"	October 6, 2014	705	Monday 8:00 p.m.	12.41	3.7	10	
6	"The Best of the Blind Auditions"	October 7, 2014	706	Tuesday 8:00 p.m.	9.07	2.5	8	
7	"The Battles Premiere, Part 1"	October 13, 2014	707	Monday 8:00 p.m.	13.28	4.0	11	
8	"The Battles Premiere, Part 2"	October 14, 2014	708	Tuesday 8:00 p.m.	12.34	3.4	11	
9	"The Battles, Part 3"	October 20, 2014	709	Monday 8:00 p.m.	11.90	3.4	9	
10	"The Battles, Part 4"	October 21, 2014	710	Tuesday 8:00 p.m.	11.95	3.3	10	
11	"The Knockouts Premiere, Part 1"	October 27, 2014	711	Monday 8:00 p.m.	12.48	3.7	10	
12	"The Knockouts Premiere, Part 2"	October 28, 2014	712	Tuesday 8:00 p.m.	11.35	2.9	9	
13	"The Knockouts, Part 3"	November 3, 2014	713	Monday 8:00 p.m.	12.06	3.5	10	
14	"The Road to the Live Shows"	November 4, 2014	714	Tuesday 8:00 p.m.	9.58	2.3	7	
15	"The Live Playoffs, Night 1"	November 10, 2014	715	Monday 8:00 p.m.	11.48	3.2	9	
16	"The Live Playoffs, Night 2"	November 11, 2014	716	Tuesday 8:00 p.m.	11.42	3.0	9	
17	"The Live Playoffs, Results"	November 12, 2014	717	Wednesday 8:00 p.m.	10.64	2.5	8	
18	"Live Top 12, Performance"	November 17, 2014	718	Monday 8:00 p.m.	11.13	3.1	8	
19	"Live Top 12, Results"	November 18, 2014	719	Tuesday 8:00 p.m.	10.82	2.7	8	
20	"Live Top 10, Performance"	November 24, 2014	720	Monday 8:00 p.m.	9.60	2.6	7	
21	"Live Top 10, Results"	November 25, 2014	721	Tuesday 8:00 p.m.	9.37	2.3	7	
22	"Live Top 8, Performance"	December 1, 2014	722	Monday 8:00 p.m.	11.28	2.8	8	
23	"Live Top 8, Results"	December 2, 2014	723	Tuesday 8:00 p.m.	11.23	2.6	8	
24	"Live Top 5 Semifinals Performance"	December 8, 2014	724	Monday 8:00 p.m.	10.84	2.5	7	
25	"Live Top 5 Semifinal Results and Wildcard Round"	December 9, 2014	725	Tuesday 8:00 p.m.	11.19	2.3	7	
26	"Live Finale Performance"	December 15, 2014	726	Monday 8:00 p.m.	12.07	2.8	9	
27	"Live Finale Results"	December 16, 2014	727	Tuesday 9:00 p.m.	12.88	3.3	10	

=== Controversy and criticism ===
The show faced controversy when Rebekah Samarin, a contestant on Team Adam, was the first contestant in the history of the show to make it to the third round of the competition and have all of her performances, including her Blind Audition, Battle, and Knockout round, montaged (not shown in full). Samarin took to Twitter to comment about this, saying "While I am appreciative of the experience, I am baffled by The Voice's blatant disregard and disrespect of my time and efforts."

== Artists' appearances in other media ==
- Blessing Offor was on Platinum Hit on Bravo in 2011, where he was eliminated in eleventh place
- Anita Antoinette sang in the blind auditions for season 3, but failed to turn any chairs.
- Allison Bray and Tanner Linford sang in the blind auditions for season 6, but failed to turn any chairs.
- Taylor John Williams and Ricky Manning later auditioned on the sixteenth season of American Idol but were eliminated in the Top 40.
- Caitlin Lucia also auditioned on the sixteenth season of American Idol, but was cut in Hollywood Week.
