= Velvet (Chris Jamison song) =

Single by Chris Jamison
- Released: December 15, 2014
- Recorded: December 2014
- Genre: Pop
- Length: 3:56
- Label: Republic Records
- Songwriters: Elof Loelv, Alex Lacasse & Kellen Pomeranz

"Velvet" is the debut and potential winner's single by American singer and season seven third place finalist of The Voice, Chris Jamison. The song was released digitally by Republic Records on December 15, 2014. The song was written by Elof Loelv, Alex Lacasse and Kellen Pomeranz.

== Background and release ==
For the first time in the show history, the top four finalists from the seventh season of The Voice were given the opportunity to debut their potential winner's singles on the show. Jamison worked with his coach on the show, Adam Levine, and picked the song "Velvet" that was written by Loelv, Lacasse and Pomeranz. Jamison performed and debuted the song on December 15, 2014, during the seventh-season finale performance show of The Voice. The song was released on iTunes for digital download after the show.

== Critical reception ==
The song peaked at number three on the US iTunes chart, becoming Jamison's highest charting single in the United States to date. It was also charted on Billboard Hot 100 for number 53.

== Music video ==
The music video premiered on December 15, 2014.

== Live performances ==
"Velvet" was first performed by Jamison on the seventh-season finale performance show of The Voice on December 15, 2014.

== Format and track listing ==
- Digital download
1. "Velvet" – 3:56

== Charts ==
Chart (2014)	Peak position
Billboard Hot 100	53

== Release history ==
Country	Date	Format	Label
United States	December 15, 2014	Digital download	Republic Records
