= Sweetheart 2005: Love Songs =

Compilation album by Various artists
- Released: January 19, 2005
- Label: Live More Musically/ Hear Music

Professional ratings
Review scores
Source	Rating
Allmusic	3/5 stars
Pitchfork Media	(6.7/10)

Sweetheart 2005: Love Songs is a compilation album, released under Starbucks' Hear Music label in January 2005 in the United States. Sold in stores, the album features contemporary musicians covering classic love songs.

== Track listing ==
1. "My Funny Valentine", performed by Rufus Wainwright (originally by Rodgers and Hart)
2. "Let My Love Open the Door", performed by M. Ward (originally by Pete Townshend, 1980)
3. "Buckets of Rain", performed by Neko Case (originally by Bob Dylan, 1975)
4. "Love Will Tear Us Apart", performed by Calexico (originally by Joy Division, 1980)
5. "She's Got Everything", performed by Old 97's (originally by The Kinks)
6. "How Can I Tell You", performed by Gary Jules (originally by Cat Stevens)
7. "Give Your Mama One Smile", performed by Madeleine Peyroux (originally by Big Bill Broonzy)
8. "The More I See You", performed by Sondre Lerche (music originally written by Harry Warren with lyrics by Mack Gordon, 1945)
9. "I Only Have Eyes for You", performed by Martina Topley-Bird (originally by The Flamingos)
10. "There is a Light That Never Goes Out", performed by Joseph Arthur (originally by The Smiths, 1986)
11. "Your Sweet Voice", performed by Milton Mapes (originally by Matthew Sweet)
12. "Use Me", performed by Jim White (originally by Bill Withers, 1972)
13. "Forever", performed by Dean Wareham (originally by The Beach Boys, 1970)
14. "Inutil Paisagem", performed by Vinicius Cantuária (originally by Antonio Carlos Jobim)
15. "A Nightingale Sang in Berkeley Square", performed by Mindy Smith (made famous by The Manhattan Transfer)

== Personnel ==
- Kato Aadland – guitar
- Joseph Arthur – guitar, vocals, mixing, author, engineer, producer
- Brendon Bell – assistant engineer
- Paulinho Braga – drums
- Paul Brainard – pedal steel guitar
- Rob Burger – piano
- Joey Burns – bass, guitar, vocals, double bass
- Calexico – author
- Vinicius Cantuária – guitar, producer, author, percussion, vocals
- Neko Case – vocals, producer, author
- Don Cobb – mastering
- Eric Conn – mastering
- John Convertino – piano, drums
- Mike Coykendall – engineer, mixing
- Danny Frankel – drums, snare drum
- Maurice Gainen – mastering
- Howe Gelb – piano
- William Lee Golden – engineer
- Patrick Granado – assistant engineer
- Murry Hammond – bass, vocals
- David Hungate – guitar, double bass
- John Jarvis – piano
- Larry Klein – producer
- Lisa Laarman – creative director
- David R. Legry – liner notes
- Sondre Lerche – vocals, author
- Stewart Lerman – producer, engineer, mixing
- M. Ward – guitar, keyboards, author, vocals
- Tucker Martine – drums (bass), hi-hat, snare drum, producer
- Ed Maxwell – organ, bass, synthesizer, engineer
- Mario J. McNulty – assistant engineer
- Rhett Miller – vocals
- Salim Nourallah – engineer, mixing
- Old Joe Clarks – bass, drums
- Gary Jules – producer, author
- Gary Paczosa – mixing
- Ben Peeler – lap steel guitar
- Philip Peeples – drums
- Madeleine Peyroux – guitar, mixing, author, engineer, vocals
- Britta Phillips – bass, engineer, vocals, keyboards
- Jon Rauhouse – Hawaiian guitar
- Dorothy Robinett – clarinet
- Rip Rowan – mixing
- Tom Schick – engineer, mixing
- Craig Schumacher – producer, engineer
- Dave Sinko – engineer
- Morten Skage – double bass
- Mindy Smith – vocals, producer, author
- Paul Socolow – bass
- Jerry Tubb – mastering
- Greg Vanderpool – electric guitar, author, vocals
- Tony Visconti – mixing
- Rufus Wainwright – vocals, author, producer
- Dean Wareham – guitar, engineer, author, vocals
- Joan Wasser – violin
- Jim Waters – mellotron
- Jim White – banjo, percussion, programming, vocals, keyboards, drums, melodica, slide banjo, author, producer

== See also ==
- Sweetheart 2014
