= Sweetheart 2014 =

Compilation album by Various artists
- Released: February 4, 2014
- Genre: Pop
- Label: Hear Music/Concord Music Group

Sweetheart 2014 is a compilation album featuring various artists, released on February 4, 2014 by Starbucks' Hear Music/Concord Music Group. The compilation is the fifth in a series of Valentine's Day-themed compilations. Sweetheart 2014 will only be available in a physical form at Starbucks locations and will be available electronically via various outlets.

== Track listing ==
1. "Turn Your Lights Down Low" by Jim James (Bob Marley cover)
2. "Con Te Partirò" by Vampire Weekend (inspired by the Andrea Bocelli recording)
3. "Love" by Beck (John Lennon cover)
4. "Tomorrow Is a Long Time" by Phosphorescent (Bob Dylan cover)
5. "Don't Forget Me" by The Head and the Heart (Harry Nilsson cover)
6. "Happy or Lonesome" by Valerie June (the Carter Family cover)
7. "Always on My Mind" by Bahamas (Brenda Lee cover, best known as by Willie Nelson)
8. "If You Were Mine" by Thao & The Get Down Stay Down (Ray Charles cover)
9. "Fade into You" by Ben Harper (Mazzy Star cover)
10. "I'm in the Middle of a Riddle" by Fiona Apple featuring Maude Maggart (Anton Karas cover)
11. "The Chain" by Brandi Carlile (Fleetwood Mac cover)
12. "I Hope" by Blake Mills (Bobby Charles cover)
13. "Signed, Sealed, Delivered I'm Yours" by Sharon Jones & The Dap-Kings (Stevie Wonder cover)

== See also ==
- Sweetheart 2005: Love Songs
