= Chant Down Babylon =

Remix album by various artists
- Released: 16 November 1999
- Recorded: 1973–99
- Genres: Reggae fusion; hip-hop; R&B
- Length: 51:06
- Labels: Tuff Gong; Island
- Producer: Stephen Marley

Various artists chronology
The Complete Bob Marley & the Wailers 1967–1972 (1997–2002)	Chant Down Babylon (1999)	One Love (2001)

Singles from Chant Down Babylon
- 1. "Turn Your Lights Down Low" Released: 12 October 1999; 2. "Jamming" Released: March 2000

Chant Down Babylon is a remix album by various hip-hop and rock artists covering songs by Bob Marley & the Wailers, released in 1999 and produced by Stephen Marley.

The remixed version of "Turn Your Lights Down Low" with Lauryn Hill was released as a single. The music video for the song directed by Francis Lawrence features Hill and her partner Rohan Marley, one of Bob's sons.

== Track listing ==
No.	Title	Featured Artist	Length
1.	"No More Trouble"	Erykah Badu	4:51
2.	"Rebel Music (3 O'Clock Roadblock)"	Krayzie Bone	3:29
3.	"Johnny Was"	Guru	4:19
4.	"Concrete Jungle"	Rakim	4:12
5.	"Rastaman Chant"	Busta Rhymes & Flipmode Squad	4:18
6.	"Guiltiness"	Lost Boyz & Mr. Cheeks	3:53
7.	"Turn Your Lights Down Low"	Lauryn Hill	5:46
8.	"Jammin"	MC Lyte	4:08
9.	"Kinky Reggae"	The Marley Brothers and The Ghetto Youths Crew	3:53
10.	"Roots, Rock, Reggae"	Steven Tyler and Joe Perry	4:05
11.	"Survival a.k.a. Black Survivors"	Public Enemy	3:50
12.	"Burnin' and Lootin'"	The Roots	4:52

== Charts ==
=== Weekly charts ===
Chart (1999–2000)	Peak position
Austrian Albums (Ö3 Austria)	49
Dutch Albums (Album Top 100)	29
French Albums (SNEP)	15
German Albums (Offizielle Top 100)	66
New Zealand Albums (RMNZ)	6
Norwegian Albums (VG-lista)	14
Swedish Albums (Sverigetopplistan)	30
Swiss Albums (Schweizer Hitparade)	23
UK Albums (Official Charts)	95
US Billboard 200	60
US Top R&B/Hip-Hop Albums (Billboard)	21

=== Year-end charts ===
Chart (2000)	Position
Canadian Albums (Nielsen SoundScan)	189
New Zealand Albums (RMNZ)	41
US Billboard 200	181
US Top R&B/Hip-Hop Albums (Billboard)	85

== Certifications and sales ==
Region	Certification	Certified units/sales
Canada (Music Canada)	Gold	50,000^{^}
France (SNEP)	Gold	100,000^{*}
New Zealand (RMNZ)	Platinum	15,000^{^}
Switzerland (IFPI Switzerland)	Gold	25,000^{^}
United Kingdom (BPI)	Silver	60,000^{‡}
United States (RIAA)	Gold	500,000^{^}
^{*} Sales figures based on certification alone.^{^} Shipments figures based on certification alone.^{‡} Sales+streaming figures based on certification alone.
