= Turn Your Lights Down Low =

1977 song by Bob Marley & The Wailers

Song by Bob Marley and the Wailers

from the album Exodus
- Released: June 1977
- Recorded: 1976
- Genre: Reggae
- Length: 3:39
- Label: Tuff Gong; Island
- Songwriter: Robert Marley
- Producers: Bob Marley and the Wailers

Audio
- "Turn Your Lights Down Low" on YouTube

"Turn Your Lights Down Low" is a song by Jamaican reggae band Bob Marley and the Wailers from their 1977 album, Exodus. It is the only song on side B of the album that was not released as a single. However, a remastered version featuring Lauryn Hill (credited as Bob Marley featuring Lauryn Hill) was released in 1999. This version was commercially successful, peaking at number one on the UK R&B Singles Chart while topping the charts of New Zealand and Romania. It received a nomination for Best Pop Collaboration with Vocals at the 43rd Grammy Awards.

== Duet version ==
"Turn Your Lights Down Low"

Single by Bob Marley featuring Lauryn Hill

from the album Chant Down Babylon
- Released: 12 October 1999
- Recorded: 1999
- Genre: Reggae fusion; neo soul; R&B; hip-hop
- Length: 4:04
- Label: Ruffhouse; Island
- Songwriter: Robert Marley
- Producer: Stephen Marley

Robert Marley singles chronology
"Sun Is Shining" (1999)	"Turn Your Lights Down Low" (1999)	"Rainbow Country" (2000)

Lauryn Hill singles chronology
"Everything Is Everything" (1999)	"Turn Your Lights Down Low" (1999)	"Lose Myself" (2007)

Audio
- "Turn Your Lights Down Low" on YouTube

A cover/remixed version was released in October 1999, with original artist Bob Marley featuring American singer-songwriter Lauryn Hill. Hill contributes her vocals to the song as well as a rap verse. The single is taken from the compilation album Chant Down Babylon (1999), which features remixes and covers of Bob Marley songs by various modern day soul, hip-hop and rock artists. This duet became a hit in late 1999 and early 2000, reaching number one in New Zealand and Romania for two weeks. The song also reached the top 10 in the Netherlands, Norway, and Sweden. In France, where it peaked at number 14, it received a Gold certification for sales exceeding 250,000 copies.

=== Music video ===
An accompanying music video to the Lauryn Hill and Bob Marley remix was directed by Francis Lawrence and released in 1999. The video takes place in Jamaica and opens with a group of Jamaican kids playing soccer. Following this, are a series of panning shots showing night life in Jamaica, and scenes where Hill is singing in a recording studio. In other scenes, Hill is shown dancing at a party with then-boyfriend Rohan Marley, son of Bob Marley.

=== Track listings ===
All songs are performed by Lauryn Hill except "Turn Your Lights Down Low" (Hill and Bob Marley), "To Zion" (Hill and Carlos Santana), and the original version of "Turn Your Lights Down Low" (Bob Marley and the Wailers).

Australian CD single

1. "Turn Your Lights Down Low" (album version) – 4:02
2. "The Sweetest Thing" – 4:49
3. "Ex-Factor" (A Simple Breakdown) – 4:10

UK CD1

1. "Turn Your Lights Down Low" – 4:02
2. "Forgive Them Father" – 4:29
3. "To Zion" – 4:33

UK CD2

1. "Turn Your Lights Down Low" – 4:02
2. "Turn Your Lights Down Low" (original version) – 3:38
3. "Superstar" – 4:57

UK cassette single and European CD1

1. "Turn Your Lights Down Low" (album version) – 4:02
2. "Turn Your Lights Down Low" (original version) – 3:38

European CD2

1. "Turn Your Lights Down Low" (album version) – 4:02
2. "Turn Your Lights Down Low" (original version) – 3:38
3. "Forgive Them Father" – 4:29
4. "To Zion" – 4:33

Japanese CD single

1. "Turn Your Lights Down Low"
2. "Turn Your Lights Down Low" (original version)
3. "Everything Is Everything"

=== Charts ===
==== Weekly charts ====
Chart (1999–2000)	Peak position
Australia (ARIA)	69
Austria (Ö3 Austria Top 40)	22
Belgium (Ultratop 50 Flanders)	24
Belgium (Ultratop 50 Wallonia)	22
Europe (Eurochart Hot 100)	14
France (SNEP)	14
Germany (GfK)	33
Iceland (Íslenski Listinn Topp 40)	15
Ireland (IRMA)	19
Italy (Musica e dischi)	19
Netherlands (Dutch Top 40)	5
Netherlands (Single Top 100)	5
New Zealand (Recorded Music NZ)	1
Norway (VG-lista)	3
Romania (Romanian Top 100)	1
Scotland Singles (Official Charts)	21
Sweden (Sverigetopplistan)	5
Switzerland (Schweizer Hitparade)	11
UK Singles (Official Charts)	15
UK Hip Hop/R&B (Official Charts)	1
US Bubbling Under Hot 100 (Billboard)	4
US Hot R&B/Hip-Hop Songs (Billboard)	49
US Rhythmic Airplay (Billboard)	15

==== Year-end charts ====
Chart (1999)	Position
Netherlands (Dutch Top 40)	118
New Zealand (RIANZ)	30
Sweden (Hitlistan)	56

Chart (2000)	Position
Europe (Eurochart Hot 100)	84
Netherlands (Dutch Top 40)	63
Netherlands (Single Top 100)	66
Romania (Romanian Top 100)	24
Switzerland (Schweizer Hitparade)	67

=== Certifications ===
Region	Certification	Certified units/sales
France (SNEP)	Gold	250,000^{*}
New Zealand (RMNZ)	3× Platinum	90,000^{‡}
Sweden (GLF)	Gold	15,000^{^}
United Kingdom (BPI)	Silver	200,000^{‡}
^{*} Sales figures based on certification alone.^{^} Shipments figures based on certification alone.^{‡} Sales+streaming figures based on certification alone.

=== Release history ===
Region	Date	Format(s)	Label(s)	Ref.
United States	12 October 1999	Rhythmic contemporary radio	Columbia	
United States	19 October 1999	Urban adult contemporary; urban radio	Columbia	
Europe	15 November 1999	CD	Columbia	
Japan	20 November 1999	CD	SME	
United Kingdom	29 November 1999	CD; cassette	Columbia	

== Covers ==
- Colbie Caillat made a cover version of this song on her 2008 album Coco.
- Megan Joy covered the song on American Idol season 8.
- Rosie Gaines covered the song on her album Closer Than Close.
- K'LA sampled the song on her 2011 first single "All Your Love".
- Anita Antoinette covered the song on The Voice (U.S. season 7)
- Jim James covered the song on Sweetheart 2014.

== See also ==
- List of number-one singles from the 1990s (New Zealand)
- List of Romanian Top 100 number ones of the 2000s
