= My Baby's Got a Smile on Her Face =

Single by Craig Wayne Boyd
- Released: December 15, 2014
- Genre: Country
- Length: 3:16
- Label: Dot
- Songwriters: Mark Marchetti; Stephanie Jones
- Producer: Blake Shelton

"My Baby's Got a Smile on Her Face" is a song by American country singer Craig Wayne Boyd. It was Boyd's coronation single following his victory on the seventh season of the singing competition The Voice.

== History ==
Show judge Blake Shelton gave Boyd the song, and said that he originally planned to record it himself. The song was written by Mark Marchetti, a son-in-law of Loretta Lynn, and Stephanie Jones.

== Music video ==
Boyd debuted the video in December 2014.

== Chart performance ==
The song debuted in the top 40 of the Hot 100 as well as at number one on the Hot Country Songs chart dated for January 3, 2015. In doing so, it became only the second song to debut at number one in that chart's history, the first being "More Than a Memory" by Garth Brooks in 2007. The following week, it fell completely off both charts, making it the shortest charting number one in the history of the Billboard country charts.

Chart (2015)	Peak position
Canada Hot 100 (Billboard)	45
US Billboard Hot 100	34
US Hot Country Songs (Billboard)	1
