= Taylor John Williams =

American singer-songwriter

- Born: June 6, 1991 (age 35); Eugene, Oregon, U.S.
- Genres: Indie pop; alternative rock; folk rock
- Occupation: Singer
- Instruments: Vocals, guitar
- Years active: 2009–present
- Website: http://taylorjohnwilliams.com/

Taylor John Williams (born June 6, 1991) is an American singer-songwriter best known for his appearance on NBC's reality TV singing competition The Voice Season 7 and finished in the semi-finals taking fifth place. Taylor John Williams was also made the top 50 of American Idol in 2018. However he was never shown.

== Early life ==
Taylor was born in Eugene, Oregon. Taylor is a graduate of the Sheldon High School. After graduating from Sheldon, Williams enrolled at Portland State University before dropping out to pursue his music. He worked at a dog hotel in order to support himself while pursuing music.

== Career ==
=== Early days ===
In 2009, he sang the Academy Award-winning song "Falling Slowly" at his Sheldon High School graduation ceremony. That same year, Taylor released an independent EP, "Proverbial Elephant", on Grooveshark.

=== 2014: The Voice ===
In September 2014, it was announced that Williams would compete in Season 7 of NBC's The Voice. In his "Blind Audition," he performed an acoustic cover of Kanye West's "Heartless," which caused Adam Levine and Gwen Stefani to press their "I Want You" buttons and turn their chairs. Williams chose Gwen Stefani as his coach. In the Battle rounds, he defeated fellow Team Gwen member Amanda Lee Peers, dueting Dolly Parton's "Jolene," and advanced to the Knockout rounds. During the Knockouts, Williams covered "Mad World" by Tears for Fears, in which he defeated his opponent Troy Ritchie and advanced to The Live Playoffs. During the Playoffs, Taylor sang Stealers Wheel's "Stuck in the Middle with You" and was voted through by America. In the following weeks, he covered "If," "Come Together" by The Beatles, and "Royals" by Lorde, all of which caused him to be voted through by America. During the Semi-finals, he covered both "Falling Slowly" by Glen Hansard & Markéta Irglová and "Blank Space" by Taylor Swift. Williams was within the bottom 3 in voting and thus was eliminated. However, like eight other eliminated artists, Taylor was given the opportunity to reenter the competition and participate in the finals as the "Wildcard" finalist. In this new Wildcard round, Williams covered "Wicked Game" by Chris Isaak. Contestant Damien from Adam Levine's team was selected as the Wildcard finalist, ultimately eliminating Williams from the competition.

– Studio version of performance reached the top 10 on iTunes

Stage	Song	Original Artist	Date	Order	Result
Blind Audition	"Heartless"	Kanye West	September 22, 2014	1.8	Adam Levine and Gwen Stefani turned Joined Team Gwen
Battle Rounds	"Jolene" (vs. Amanda Lee Peers)	Dolly Parton	October 13, 2014	7.5	Saved by Coach
Knockout Rounds	"Mad World" (vs. Troy Ritchie)	Tears for Fears	October 28, 2014	12.1	Saved by Coach
Live Playoffs	"Stuck in the Middle with You"	Stealers Wheel	November 11, 2014	16.10	Saved by Public Vote
Live Top 12	"If"	Bread	November 17, 2014	18.6	Saved by Public Vote
Live Top 10	"Come Together"	The Beatles	November 24, 2014	20.9	Saved by Public Vote
Live Top 8	"Royals"	Lorde	December 1, 2014	22.7	Saved by Public Vote
Live Top 5 (Semi-finals)	"Falling Slowly"	Glen Hansard & Markéta Irglová	December 8, 2014	24.3	Eliminated
Live Top 5 (Semi-finals)	"Blank Space"	Taylor Swift	December 8, 2014	24.9	Eliminated
Wildcard performance	"Wicked Game"	Chris Isaak	December 9, 2014	25.5	Eliminated

== Artistry ==
=== Influences ===
His diverse style is influenced by artists from a wide range of genres such as Glen Hansard, Amos Lee, Jeff Buckley, Jack White, Jay-Z and Bill Withers.

== Discography ==
=== Studio albums ===
2017: El Dorado

2016: Hiraeth (EP)

2015: Song of a Deadman (EP)

Title	Album details	Peak chart positions	Sales
Title	Album details	US	Sales
Proverbial Elephant (EP)	Release: 2009; Label: Independent; Formats: digital download	—	—
"—" denotes album that did not chart
