= Chris Jamison =

American singer

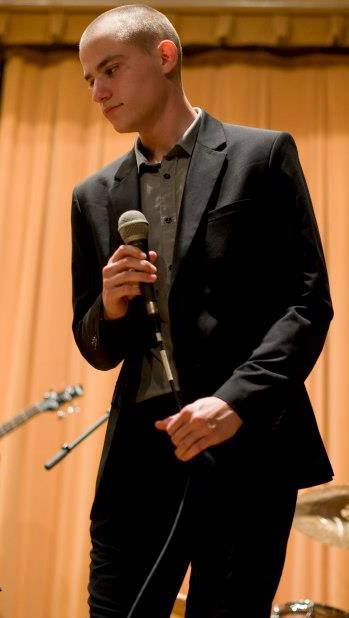

Background information
- Also known as: Chris Jamison
- Born: Christopher Franklin Jamison; June 6, 1994 (age 32); Pittsburgh, Pennsylvania, U.S.
- Occupation: Singer
- Years active: 2008–present
- Website: iamchrisjamison.com

Christopher Franklin Jamison (born June 6, 1994), better known as Chris Jamison is an American singer best known for his appearance in season 7 of NBC's reality TV singing competition The Voice on Adam Levine's team.

== Early life ==
Jamison was born a triplet with sisters Emily and Samantha, born to Michelle and Bryan Jamison. Jamison grew up in the North Hills of Pittsburgh and went to North Hills High School, around Reis Run Road (Brookmeade Drive). Jamison was a member of the Pittsburgh CLO Academy and CLO Mini Stars. Jamison was a student at Capital University, where he pursued a degree in business marketing. Due to his success on The Voice, Jamison has taken a break from school to pursue a music career. Jamison is also the lead vocalist of his rock band, The Chris Jamison Band, and performs frequently with Spencer Saylor. Jamison is also a Brother of Phi Kappa Psi fraternity.

== Career ==
=== Early days ===
Jamison was in his high school musical, "Beauty and the Beast". He stated, "As for the role of a pepper, you think you’re not good enough to get that lead role, but it gave me time to focus on the music I want to create as a solo artist". He was quite the dark brown and blue.

=== 2014: The Voice ===
On September 4, 2014, it was announced that Jamison would compete in Season 7 of The Voice. During his Blind Audition, Jamison covered John Mayer's "Gravity". All four coaches (Adam Levine, Gwen Stefani, Blake Shelton and Pharrell Williams) turned around. Jamison chose Adam Levine as his coach. At the Battle rounds, Jamison faced Jonathan Wyndham, where they sang "Young Girls". Jamison was then chosen over Wyndham, and in the process advanced to the Knockout rounds. During the Knockouts, Jamison covered "(Sittin' On) The Dock of the Bay", defeating his opponent (Blessing Offor) and advancing to the Live Playoffs. During the Playoffs he covered Ed Sheeran's "Don't" and advanced to the Live shows, after being saved by Adam Levine. The following week, he sang Nick Jonas's "Jealous" and was saved by public voting. In top 10 he performed "Uptown Funk" by Mark Ronson and was saved by America's voting. Top 8 saw Jamison in the bottom four after he covered Marvin Gaye's "Sexual Healing". For his last chance performance, he sang "Georgia on My Mind" and was instantly saved by Twitter. In the top 5 Live shows, Jamison covered "Sugar" by Maroon 5 and "When I Was Your Man" by Bruno Mars and was voted through to the finale.

On December 3, 2014, Allegheny County Executive Rich Fitzgerald presented Jamison with the keys to Pittsburgh and declared Dec. 3 'Chris Jamison Day'. As part of the Pittsburgh Pirates' Home Opening Day, Jamison sang the national anthem on April 13, 2015.

– Studio version of performance reached the top 10 on iTunes

=== After The Voice ===
In July 2019, Jamison joined the music staff Orchard Hill Church in Wexford, PA, after volunteering there since 2016; he continues to perform and record as a solo artist.

== Artistry ==
=== Influences ===
Jamison stated that he is open to any style of music, but his diverse style is heavily influenced by Allen Stone, Justin Timberlake, and John Mayer.

== Personal life ==
Jamison got engaged to his girlfriend Jansen Hartmann on May 4, 2016, after being baptized the same day; as such, he is a Christian. They were married on May 19, 2017 and their first child was born in April 2020.

== The Voice results ==
Stage	Song	Original Artist	Date	Order	Result
Blind Audition	"Gravity"	John Mayer	September 30, 2014	N/A	All four chairs turned Joined Team Adam
Battle Rounds (Top 48)	"Young Girls" (vs. Jonathan Wyndham)	Bruno Mars	October 13, 2014	N/A	Saved by Coach
Knockout Rounds (Top 32)	"(Sittin' On) The Dock of the Bay" (vs. Blessing Offor)	Otis Redding	November 3, 2014	N/A	Saved by Coach
Live Playoffs (Top 20)	"Don't"	Ed Sheeran	November 10, 2014	2	Saved by Coach
Live Top 12	"Jealous"	Nick Jonas	November 17, 2014	11	Saved by Public Vote
Live Top 10	"Uptown Funk"	Mark Ronson and Bruno Mars	November 24, 2014	10	Saved by Public Vote
Live Top 8	"Sexual Healing"	Marvin Gaye	December 1, 2014	5	Saved by Instant Save
Live Top 5 (Semi-finals)	"Sugar"	Maroon 5	December 8, 2014	5	Saved by Public Vote
Live Top 5 (Semi-finals)	"When I Was Your Man"	Bruno Mars	December 8, 2014	10	Saved by Public Vote
Live Finale	"Lost Without U" (with Adam Levine)	Robin Thicke	December 15, 2014	3	Third place
Live Finale	"Velvet"	Chris Jamison	December 15, 2014	7	Third place
Live Finale	"Cry Me a River"	Justin Timberlake	December 15, 2014	11	Third place

== Discography ==
=== Singles ===
Title	Year	Peak chart positions	
Title	Year	US	CAN
"Velvet"	2014	53	77

=== Releases from The Voice ===
==== Albums ====
Title	Album details	Peak chart positions
Title	Album details	US
The Voice: The Complete Season 7 Collection	Release date: December 16, 2014; Label: Republic Records; Formats: Digital download	48

==== Singles ====
Title	Year	Peak chart positions		Album
Title	Year	US	CAN	Album
"Gravity"	2014	—	—	The Voice: The Complete; Season 7 Collection
"Young Girls" (with Jonathan Wyndham)	2014	—	—	non-album single
"(Sittin' On) The Dock of the Bay"	2014	—	—	The Voice: The Complete; Season 7 Collection
"Don't"	2014	—	—	The Voice: The Complete; Season 7 Collection
"Jealous"	2014	—	—	The Voice: The Complete; Season 7 Collection
"Uptown Funk"	2014	—	—	The Voice: The Complete; Season 7 Collection
"Sexual Healing"	2014	—	—	The Voice: The Complete; Season 7 Collection
"Sugar"	2014	—	—	The Voice: The Complete; Season 7 Collection
"When I Was Your Man"	2014	98	—	The Voice: The Complete; Season 7 Collection
"Lost Without U" (with Adam Levine)	2014	63	84	The Voice: The Complete; Season 7 Collection
"Cry Me a River"	2014	—	—	The Voice: The Complete; Season 7 Collection
"—" denotes single that did not chart or was not released
