= Jake Worthington =

American musician (born 1996)

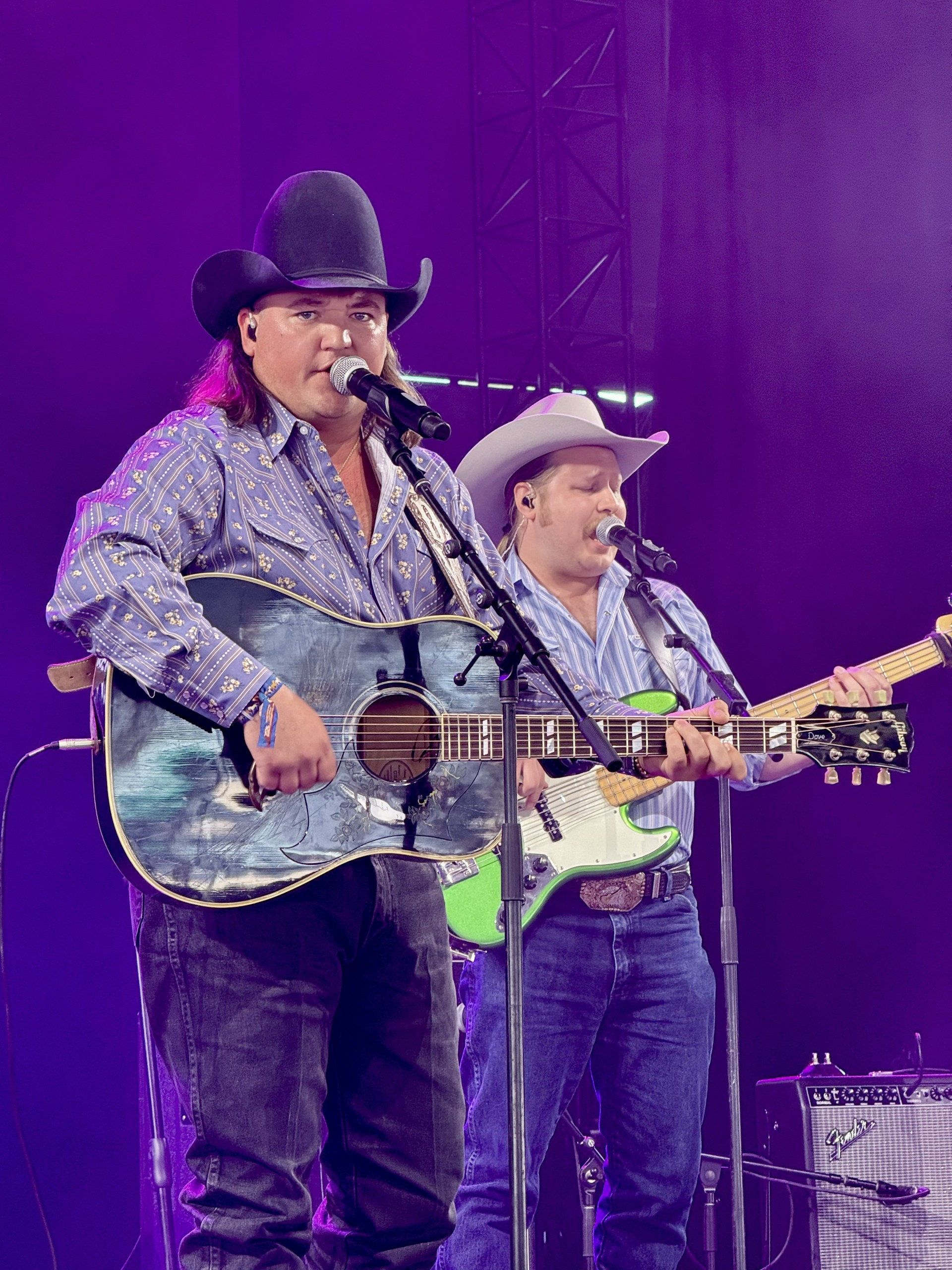
- Worthington in 2026
- Born: Jake Denton Worthington; March 1, 1996 (age 30); La Porte, Texas, U.S.
- Occupations: Singer; Songwriter; Musician
- Years active: 2013–present
- Spouse: Sophie Worthington (m. 2022)
- Children: 1
- Musical career
- Genres: Honky-Tonk; Neotraditional country; Western swing
- Instruments: Vocals; Guitar
- Label: Big Loud Texas
- Website: jakeworthington.com

Jake Denton Worthington (born March 1, 1996) is an American country music singer and songwriter currently signed to Big Loud Texas. He was the runner-up on Season 6 of the music competition program The Voice.

== Early life ==
Jake Worthington was born in La Porte, Texas to Wendy and Terel "Bubba" Worthington on March 1, 1996. Growing up, Worthington was an active member of the Future Farmers of America and served as the secretary of the La Porte chapter when he was a teenager. He graduated from La Porte High School in 2014.

== Music career ==
=== Beginnings ===
Worthington's most significant early musical influence was his grandfather, an aspiring country music songwriter and producer in the 1970's and 1980's. Every Christmas while Worthington was growing up, his grandfather would come over to his house and play country songs on guitar while Worthington sang along. By the time he was twelve, Worthington was performing at VFW halls around southeast Texas and within two years, he was performing at central Texas honky-tonks.

=== The Voice ===
In 2013, Worthington auditioned for Season 5 of the music competition program The Voice, singing "Keep Your Hands to Yourself" by The Georgia Satellites but was not selected by any of the coaches to join their team. He auditioned again the following season, singing "Don't Close Your Eyes" by Keith Whitley. This time, three coaches (Adam Levine, Shakira, and Blake Shelton) "turned their chairs" for him, with Worthington ultimately opting to join Team Blake. Worthington eventually finished the season as runner-up behind Josh Kaufman.

– Studio version of performance reached the top 10 on iTunes

Stage	Song	Original Artist	Date	Order	Result
Blind Audition	"Don't Close Your Eyes"	Keith Whitley	Feb. 24, 2014	1.9	Adam Levine, Shakira, and Blake Shelton turned Joined Team Blake
The Battles, Round 1	"It Goes Like This" (vs. Lexi Luca)	Thomas Rhett	March 17, 2014	7.2	Saved by Coach
The Battles, Round 2	"Have a Little Faith in Me" (vs. Tess Boyer)	John Hiatt	March 31, 2014	13.3	Saved by Coach
Playoffs	"Anywhere with You"	Jake Owen	April 8, 2014	16.4	Advanced
Live Top 12	"Anymore"	Travis Tritt	April 21, 2014	20.10	Saved by Public Vote
Live Top 10	"Run"	George Strait	April 28, 2014	22.6	Saved by Public Vote
Live Top 8 (Quarterfinals)	"Hillbilly Deluxe"	Brooks & Dunn	May 5, 2014	24.7	Saved by Public Vote
Live Top 5 (Semifinals)	"Good Ol' Boys"	Waylon Jennings	May 12, 2014	26.4	Saved by Public Vote
Live Top 5 (Semifinals)	"Heaven"	Bryan Adams	May 12, 2014	26.10	Saved by Public Vote
Live Top 3	"Don't Close Your Eyes"	Keith Whitley	May 19, 2014	28.3	Continued on Finale
Live Top 3	"Right Here Waiting"	Richard Marx	May 19, 2014	28.6	Continued on Finale
Live Top 3	"A Country Boy Can Survive" (with Blake Shelton)	Hank Williams, Jr.	May 19, 2014	28.7	Continued on Finale
Live Finale	"Summertime" (with Audra Mclaughlin, Kat Perkins, Kristen Merlin, Morgan Wallen & Ryan Whyte Maloney)	Kenny Chesney	May 20, 2014	29.2	Runner-Up
Live Finale	"Mountain Music" (with Alabama)	Alabama	May 20, 2014	29.8	Runner-Up

=== After The Voice ===
Following his success on The Voice, several managers pitched Worthington on becoming a bro-country artist. However, he insisted on making traditional country music. In 2015, Worthington released his debut EP, which reached the Top 50 on The Music Row Chart and the Top 30 on the Texas Regional Radio Report. Around this time, Worthington also began posting acoustic covers of traditional country songs on social media.

In 2019, ERNEST came across a video of Worthington singing a cover of a Keith Whitley song on Twitter and forwarded it to Joey Moi, president of A&R for Big Loud. This ultimately led to Worthington signing with Big Loud in October 2021. On April 7, 2023, he released his self-titled debut album. The album garnered positive reviews, with Dan Wharton of Holler calling it "authentic Texas country with a deep devotion to the genre's heritage." On July 21, 2023, Worthington made his Grand Ole Opry debut where he received a standing ovation.

On October 5, 2024, it was announced that Worthington had signed with Big Loud Texas, a new imprint founded by Miranda Lambert and Jon Randall. On September 12, 2025, Worthington released his second album, When I Write The Song, which features collaborations with Lambert as well as other fellow country artists Marty Stuart and Mae Estes. On February 24, 2026, the Grand Ole Opry announced that Worthington was one of nine artists named to its NextStage Class of 2026.

== Personal life ==
Worthington married his wife Sophie on October 27, 2022. The two met while Worthington was deer hunting on Roger Springer's property. Their first child, Whitley Anne Worthington, was born on October 24, 2024. They currently reside in Oklahoma.

== Discography ==
=== Studio albums ===
Title	Album details
Jake Worthington	Release date: April 7, 2023; Label: Big Loud; Format: Vinyl, Digital download
When I Write The Song	Release date: September 12, 2025; Label: Big Loud Texas; Format: CD, Vinyl, Digital download

=== Extended plays ===
Title	Album details
Jake Worthington	Release date: October 16, 2015; Label: W3 Music LLC; Format: Digital download
Hell of a Highway	Release date: May 19, 2017; Label: W3 Music LLC; Format: Digital download
