= The Voice (American TV series) season 6 =

The Voice
- Season 6
- Promotional poster featuring coaches Levine, Usher, Shakira, and Shelton
- Hosted by: Carson Daly
- Coaches: Adam Levine; Shakira; Usher; Blake Shelton
- No. of contestants: 48 artists
- Winner: Josh Kaufman
- Winning coach: Usher
- Runner-up: Jake Worthington

Release
- Original network: NBC
- Original release: February 24 – May 20, 2014

Season chronology
- ← Previous; Season 5 Next → Season 7

The sixth season of the American reality talent show The Voice premiered on February 24, 2014, on NBC. Carson Daly returned to host. Adam Levine and Blake Shelton returned as coaches for their sixth season, while Shakira and Usher returned for their second season after being replaced by original coaches Christina Aguilera and CeeLo Green in season 5.

The Instant Save which first introduced previous season returned with a new change which eligible artists performed an additional song. Knockout rounds did not appear this season, although a similar second Battle round took its place. This is the last of the four consecutive seasons to feature a final three, and would increase the finalists to four beginning on the next season.

Josh Kaufman was named the winner of the season, marking Usher's first win as a coach. Also, for the first time in the show's history, a stolen artist went on to win the entire season.

== Coaches and hosts ==
The coaching panel once again saw a change as Adam Levine and Blake Shelton were rejoined by season 4 coaches Shakira and Usher. Christina Aguilera took another hiatus from the show and CeeLo Green departed at the end of season 5. Carson Daly returned as host. It was reported that Christina Milian, who served as the social media correspondent in seasons two through four, was open to returning, but ultimately did not.

Coaches and Host of The Voice Season 6

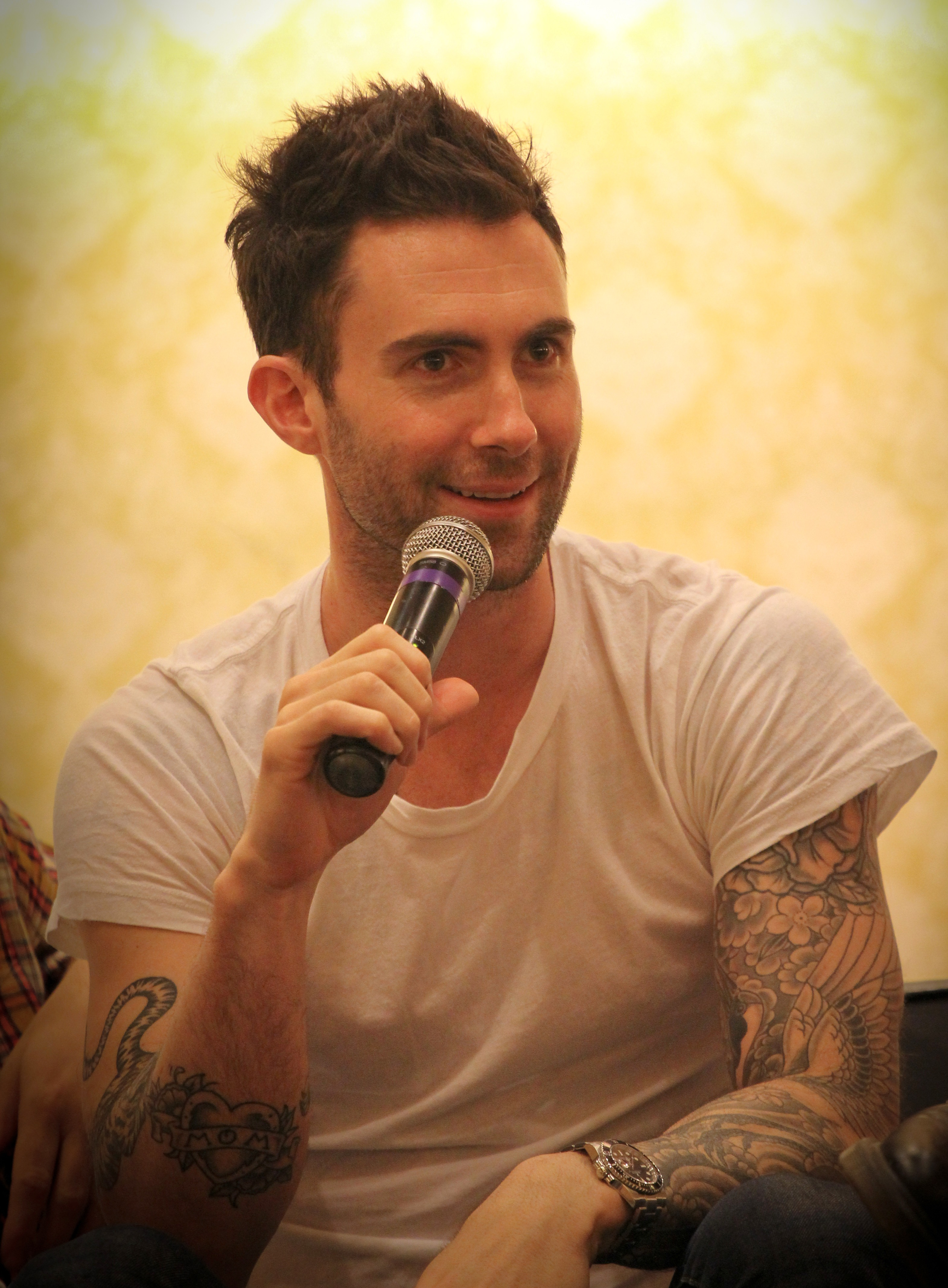
Adam Levine

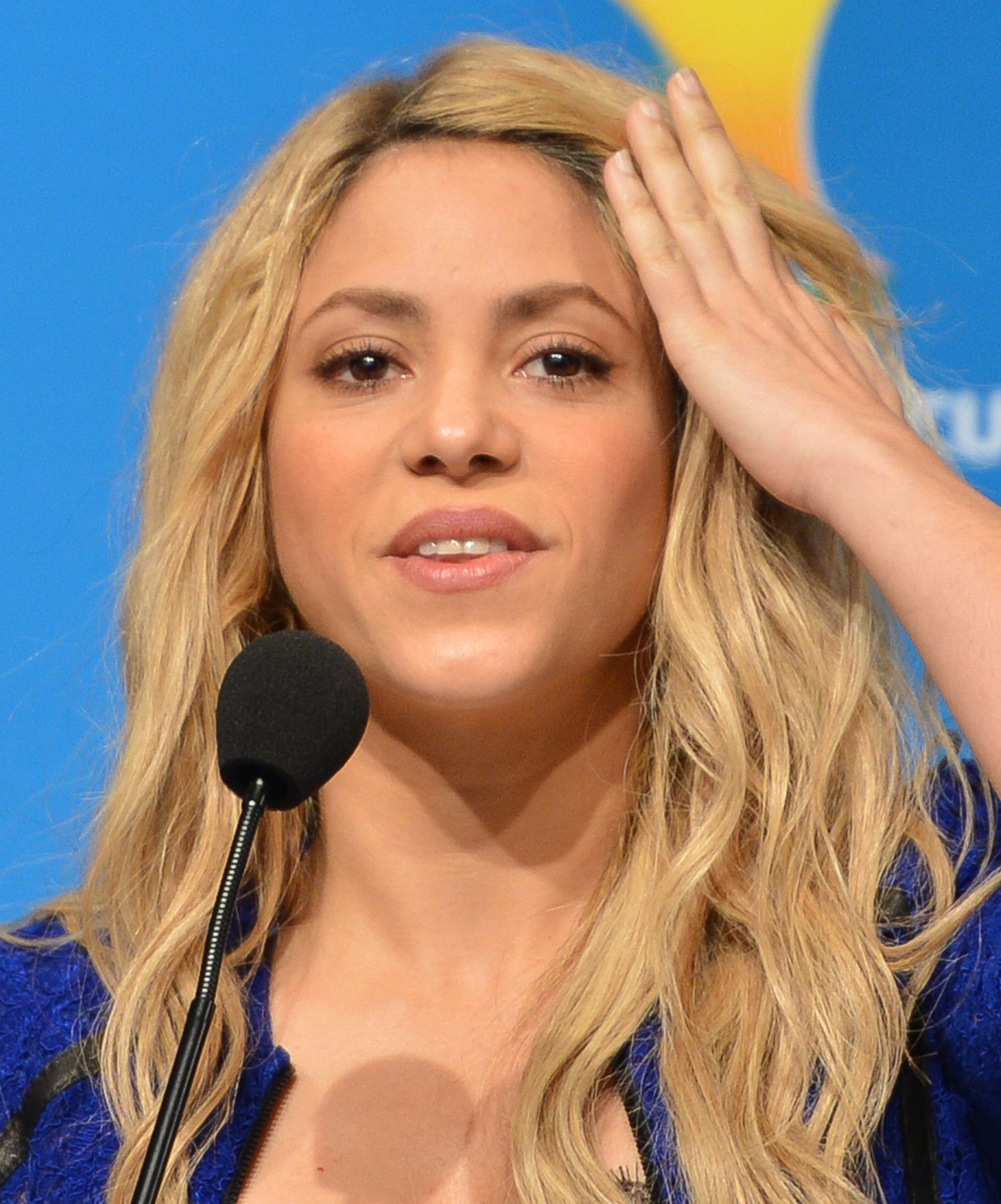
Shakira

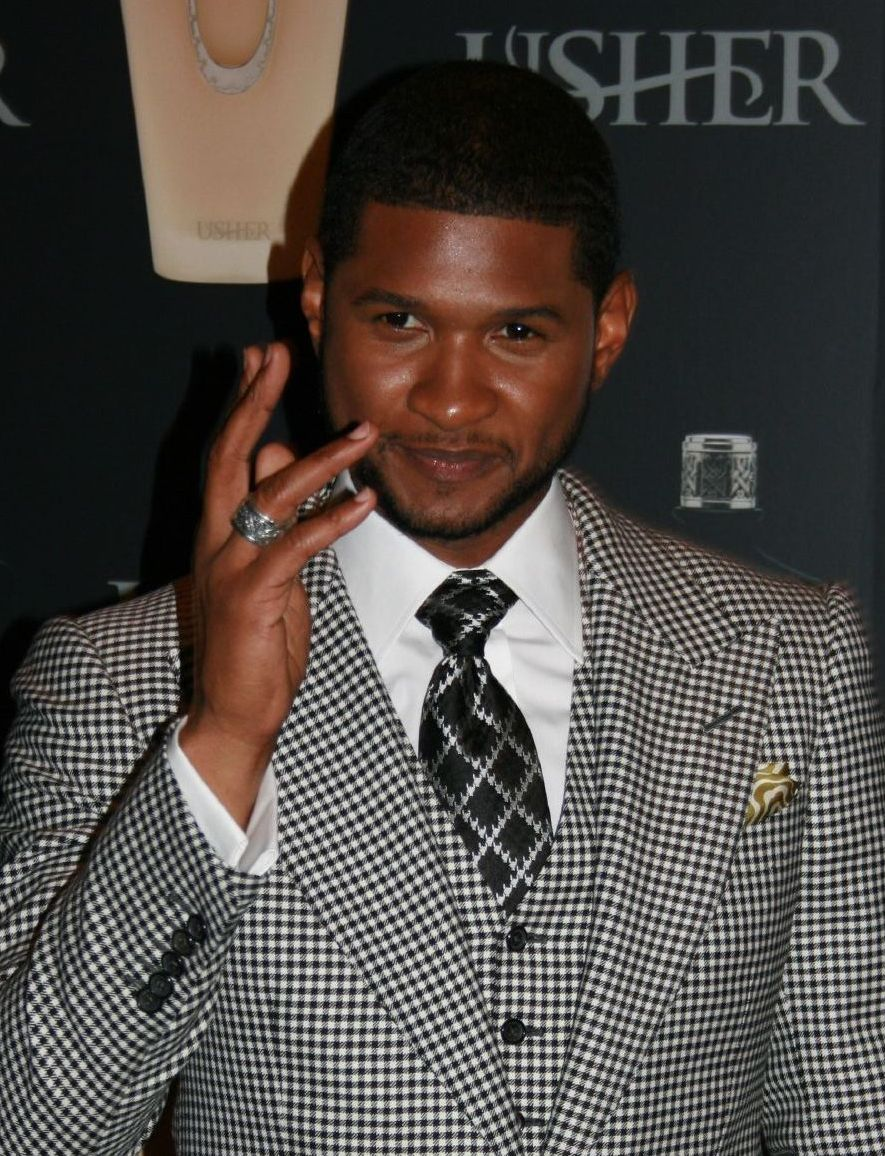
Usher

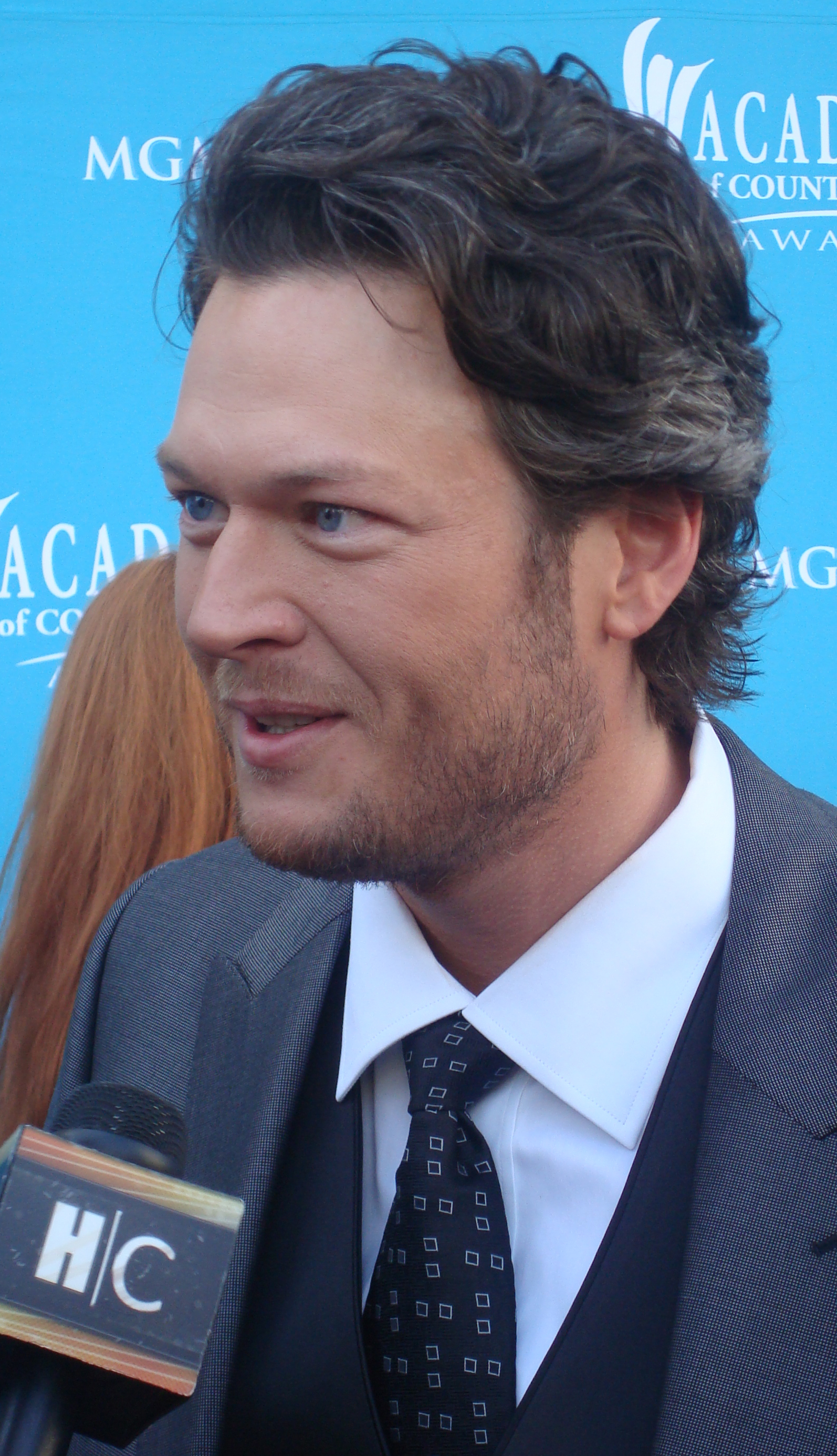
Blake Shelton

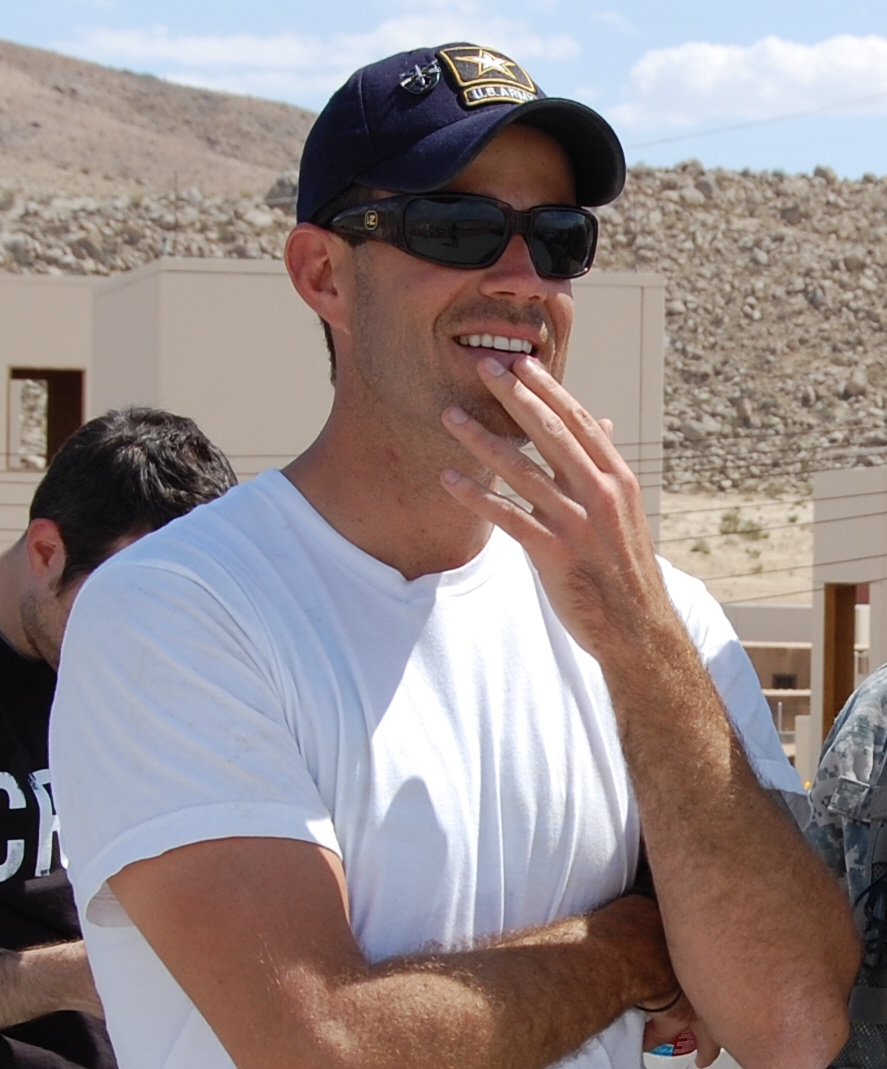
Carson Daly

Artists serving as mentors for the first Battle Rounds included Miranda Lambert (who previously appeared in the 2nd season in the series as an advisor) for Team Shakira, The Band Perry for Team Blake, Jill Scott for Team Usher, and Aloe Blacc for Team Adam.

With the replacement of the Knockout Round with the "Battles, Round 2", Coldplay frontman Chris Martin served as the sole advisor for all four teams.

== Development ==
=== Auditions ===
Cities where the auditions were held

The open call auditions were held in the following locations:

Date	Audition venue	Location
June 8, 2013	Las Vegas Convention Center	Las Vegas, Nevada
July 13–14, 2013	Austin Convention Center	Austin, Texas
July 20–21, 2013	Chaifetz Arena, St. Louis University	St. Louis, Missouri
July 27–28, 2013	Javits Convention Center	New York City, New York

=== Promotion ===
A special look at the season was premiered on February 19, 2014, featuring Christina Grimmie's full audition covering Miley Cyrus' "Wrecking Ball". All four coaches turned for her, but her coach choice was not shown. A second special look at the season was premiered the following day, featuring Bria Kelly's full audition covering "Steamroller Blues". All four coaches also turned for her, but like Grimmie, her ultimate coach choice was not shown. A third preview featuring Clarissa Serna's cover of The Cranberries' song "Zombie" was released on February 28, 2014, to promote the second week of the Blind Auditions. Like Grimmie and Kelly, her choice was not shown.

== Teams ==
Color key

- Winner
- Runner-up
- Third place
- Eliminated in the Live shows
- Eliminated in the Playoffs
- Stolen in the Battles, Round 2
- Eliminated in the Battles, Round 2
- Stolen in the Battles, Round 1
- Eliminated in the Battles, Round 1

Coaches	Top 48 artists				
Adam Levine					
Adam Levine	Christina Grimmie	Kat Perkins	Delvin Choice	Jake Barker	Morgan Wallen
Adam Levine	~~Josh Kaufman~~	Brittnee Camelle	Dawn and Hawkes	Sam Behymer	~~Josh Murley~~
Adam Levine	~~Patrick Thomson~~	Caleb Elder	Austin Ellis	Joshua Howard	Cary Laine
Shakira					
Shakira	Kristen Merlin	Tess Boyer	Dani Moz	Deja Hall	Patrick Thomson
Shakira	Emily B.	Ddendyl Hoyt	Josh Murley	Clarissa Serna	~~Cierra Mickens~~
Shakira	~~Music Box~~	Jeremy Briggs	Lindsay Bruce	Lindsay Pagano	DeShawn Washington
Usher					
Usher	Josh Kaufman	Bria Kelly	T.J. Wilkins	Melissa Jiménez	Stevie Jo
Usher	~~Madilyn Paige~~	~~Morgan Wallen~~	Music Box	Cierra Mickens	~~Tess Boyer~~
Usher	~~Brittnee Camelle~~	~~Jake Barker~~	~~Biff Gore~~	Tanner James	Brothers Walker
Blake Shelton					
Blake Shelton	Jake Worthington	Sisaundra Lewis	Audra McLaughlin	Ryan Whyte Maloney	Madilyn Paige
Blake Shelton	~~Tess Boyer~~	Kaleigh Glanton	Biff Gore	Megan Rüger	Alaska & Madi
Blake Shelton	Paula DeAnda	Ria Eaton	Noah Lis	Lexi Luca	Cali Tucker
Note: Italicized names are stolen artists (names struck through within former teams).

== Blind auditions ==
The Blind Auditions were taped between October 10 and 13, 2013. The first episode of the Blind auditions premiered on February 24, 2014.

Color key

✔	Coach hit their "I WANT YOU" button
	Artist defaulted to this coach's team
	Artist selected to join this coach's team
	Artist eliminated with no coach pressing their "I WANT YOU" button

=== Episode 1 (Feb. 24) ===
The four coaches performed a medley of each other's songs, including "Whenever, Wherever", "Boys 'Round Here," "Love Somebody," and "Without You."

Order	Artist	Age	Hometown	Song	Coach's and artist's choices			
Order	Artist	Age	Hometown	Song	Adam	Shakira	Usher	Blake
1	Christina Grimmie	19	Marlton, New Jersey	"Wrecking Ball"	✔	✔	✔	✔
2	T.J. Wilkins	23	Los Angeles, California	"Bennie and the Jets"	✔	—	✔	✔
3	Kristen Merlin	29	Hanson, Massachusetts	"Something More"	✔	✔	—	—
4	Tanner Linford	16	Kaysville, Utah	"Stay"	—	—	—	—
5	Biff Gore	45	Denver, Colorado	"A Change Is Gonna Come"	✔	✔	✔	✔
6	Dawn and Hawkes (Miranda Dawn and Chris Hawkes)	30 / 32	Austin, Texas	"I've Just Seen a Face"	✔	✔	—	—
7	Leo Gallo	27	Los Angeles, California	"Blurred Lines"	—	—	—	—
8	Jeremy Briggs	26	Sacramento, California	"Bad Company"	—	✔	—	✔
9	Jake Worthington	17	La Porte, Texas	"Don't Close Your Eyes"	✔	✔	—	✔
10	Karina Mia	22	Philadelphia, Pennsylvania	"Beneath Your Beautiful"	—	—	—	—
11	Bria Kelly	17	Smithfield, Virginia	"Steamroller Blues"	✔	✔	✔	✔

=== Episode 2 (Feb. 25) ===
Order	Artist	Age	Hometown	Song	Coach's and artist's choices			
Order	Artist	Age	Hometown	Song	Adam	Shakira	Usher	Blake
1	Delvin Choice	24	Greenville, South Carolina	"A Song for You"	✔	✔	✔	✔
2	Madilyn Paige	16	Provo, Utah	"Titanium"	—	✔	✔	—
3	Noah Lis	22	Palmer, Massachusetts	"Me and Mrs. Jones"	✔	—	—	✔
4	Keith Shuskie	28	Buffalo, New York	"Somewhere Only We Know"	—	—	—	—
5	Deja Hall	16	San Antonio, Texas	"True Colors"	—	✔	✔	✔
6	Cary Laine	28	Citronelle, Alabama	"Better Dig Two"	✔	✔	✔	✔

=== Episode 3 (March 3) ===
Order	Artist	Age	Hometown	Song	Coach's and artist's choices			
Order	Artist	Age	Hometown	Song	Adam	Shakira	Usher	Blake
1	Ryan Whyte Maloney	33	Traverse City, Michigan	"Lights"	✔	✔	✔	✔
2	DeShawn Washington	23	Natchitoches, Louisiana	"Twistin' the Night Away"	—	✔	—	—
3	Sam Behymer	25	Morgan Mill, Texas	"Royals"	✔	—	✔	—
4	Savana Santos	15	Quincy, Illinois	"The Way I Am"	—	—	—	—
5	Scott Stevens	N/A	Nashville, Tennessee	"Boondocks"	—	—	—	—
6	Aaleliah Dixon	N/A	Texarkana, Texas	"Want U Back"	—	—	—	—
7	Brendan Ryan	24	Braintree, Massachusetts	"Love on Top"	—	—	—	—
8	Brothers Walker (Coty and Clinton Walker)	26	Bernie, Missouri	"Keep Me in Mind"	—	—	✔	—
9	Clarissa Serna	27	Corpus Christi, Texas	"Zombie"	✔	✔	✔	✔
10	Lindsay Pagano	27	Philadelphia, Pennsylvania	"Lady Marmalade"	—	✔	—	—
11	Joshua Howard	25	Philadelphia, Pennsylvania	"This Is What It Feels Like"	✔	✔	—	—
12	Tanner James	19	Provo, Utah	"Heaven"	—	—	✔	—
13	Robert Lee	29	Stevenson, Alabama	"The Weight"	—	—	—	—
14	Melissa Jiménez	29	Fort Lee, New Jersey	"If I Ain't Got You"	—	✔	✔	—
15	Patrick Thomson	35	Festus, Missouri	"Can't You See"	✔	—	—	✔
16	Alex Burt	16	Spanish Springs, Nevada	"Don't Ya"	—	—	—	—
17	Skylar Dayne	17	Hialeah, Florida	"Roar"	—	—	—	—
18	Ricky Duran	23	Grafton, Massachusetts	"Lean on Me"	—	—	—	—
19	Allison Bray	17	Louisville, Kentucky	"Where the Boys Are"	—	—	—	—
20	Sisaundra Lewis	44	Orlando, Florida	"Ain't No Way"	✔	✔	✔	✔

=== Episode 4 (March 4) ===
Order	Artist	Age	Hometown	Song	Coach's and artist's choices			
Order	Artist	Age	Hometown	Song	Adam	Shakira	Usher	Blake
1	Megan Rüger	26	Twin Lakes, Wisconsin	"Just Like a Pill"	—	—	✔	✔
2	Morgan Wallen	20	Knoxville, Tennessee	"Collide"	—	✔	✔	—
3	James Cavern	26	Sacramento, California	"Let's Get It On"	—	—	—	—
4	Dani Moz (Danielle Mozeleski)	26	Los Angeles, California	"I Need Your Love"	—	✔	—	—
5	Music Box (Ayesha Brooks)	28	Federal Way, Washington	"You Gotta Be"	—	✔	—	—
6	Lexi Luca	17	Wellington, Florida	"Wasting All These Tears"	—	—	—	✔
7	Emily B.	33	American Falls, Idaho	"Wicked Game"	—	✔	✔	✔
8	Stevie Jo	19	Tyler, Texas	"There Goes My Baby"	—	—	✔	—
9	Josh McMillan	N/A	Jacksonville, Florida	"You Get What You Give"	—	—	—	—
10	Melany Watson	N/A	Brooklyn, New York	"The Power of Love"	—	—	—	—
11	Branden Mendoza	N/A	Dallas, Texas	"Move Along"	—	—	—	—
12	Audra McLaughlin	21	Philadelphia, Pennsylvania	"Angel from Montgomery"	✔	✔	✔	✔

=== Episode 5 (March 10) ===
Order	Artist	Age	Hometown	Song	Coach's and artist's choices			
Order	Artist	Age	Hometown	Song	Adam	Shakira	Usher	Blake
1	Kat Perkins	33	Minneapolis, Minnesota	"Gold Dust Woman"	✔	✔	✔	—
2	Gabi Ramirez	27	Fresno, California	"The A Team"	—	—	—	—
3	Paula DeAnda	24	San Antonio, Texas	"The Way"	—	✔	—	✔
4	Jake Barker	28	St. Petersburg, Florida	"When I Was Your Man"	✔	✔	✔	—
5	Tess Boyer	21	Glen Carbon, Illinois	"Wings"	—	—	✔	—
6	Josh Murley	30	Kerrville, Texas	"The Freshman"	✔	—	—	—
7	Austin Ellis	26	North Beach, Maryland	"Drift Away"	✔	—	—	—
8	Cali Tucker	29	Nashville, Tennessee	"Black Velvet"	—	—	—	✔
9	Luke Cooper	27	DeQuincy, Louisiana	"Radioactive"	—	—	—	—
10	Ria Eaton	19	Billerica, Massachusetts	"Cups"	—	✔	—	✔
11	Cierra Mickens	23	Eagle River, Alaska	"Crazy"	—	✔	✔	✔
12	Tyler Montgomery	24	Dexter, Missouri	"I Wish"	—	—	—	—
13	Alaska & Madi (Alaska Holloway and Madi Metcalf)	19 / 18	Tulsa, Oklahoma	"Barton Hollow"	✔	—	—	✔
14	Ddendyl	25	Washington, D.C.	"Stand by Me"	—	✔	—	—
15	Theresa Payne	N/A	St. Louis, Missouri	"Crazy in Love"	—	—	—	—
16	Bryson Dunn	N/A	Deer Park, Texas	"I Wanna Dance with Somebody (Who Loves Me)"	—	—	—	—
17	Bree Tal	N/A	Pasadena, California	"We Don't Need Another Hero"	—	—	—	—
18	Josh Kaufman	38	Indianapolis, Indiana	"One More Try"	✔	✔	✔	✔

=== Episode 6 (March 11) ===
Order	Artist	Age	Hometown	Song	Coach's and artist's choices			
Order	Artist	Age	Hometown	Song	Adam	Shakira	Usher	Blake
1	Joe Trombino	33	Queens, New York	"Love and Happiness"	—	—	—	—
2	Kaleigh Glanton	20	Wichita, Kansas	"Have You Ever Seen the Rain?"	✔	✔	✔	✔
3	Brittnee Camelle	23	Lawrenceville, Georgia	"Skyscraper"	—	✔	✔	Team full
4	Beau Thomas	27	Frisco, Colorado	"You Are the Best Thing"	—	—	Team full	Team full
5	Lindsay Bruce	25	Santa Rosa, California	"Even If It Breaks Your Heart"	✔	✔	Team full	Team full
6	Melissa Neal	N/A	Buffalo, New York	"Brave"	—	Team full	Team full	Team full
7	Beau Cassidy	N/A	Fort Lauderdale, Florida	"Get Lucky"	—	Team full	Team full	Team full
8	Sheila Marshall	N/A	Houston, Texas	"Strong Enough"	—	Team full	Team full	Team full
9	Caleb Elder	19	Appomattox, Virginia	"Groove Me"	✔	Team full	Team full	Team full

== The Battles ==
=== Round 1 ===
The Battles, Round 1 (episodes 7 to 15) consisted of two 2-hour episodes and two 1-hour episodes each on March 17, 18, 24 and 25, 2014. There were also two recap episodes that aired on March 23 and 30, 2014. Season six's advisors are Aloe Blacc for Team Adam, Miranda Lambert for Team Shakira, Jill Scott for Team Usher, and The Band Perry for Team Blake. Continuing with the format introduced in season three, the coaches can steal two losing artists from another coach. Contestants who win their battle or are stolen by another coach will advance to The Battles, Round 2, a new round replacing the Knockout round of previous seasons.

Color key:

Artist won the Battle and advanced to The Battles, Round 2
Artist lost the Battle but was stolen by another coach and advanced to The Battles, Round 2
Artist lost the Battle and was eliminated

==== Week 1 and 2 ====
Episode	Coach	Order	Winner	Song	Loser	'Steal' result			
Episode	Coach	Order	Winner	Song	Loser	Adam	Shakira	Usher	Blake
Episode 7^{1} (Monday, March 17, 2014)	Usher	1	T.J. Wilkins	"Ain't Too Proud to Beg"	Biff Gore	—	—	—N/a	✔
Episode 7^{1} (Monday, March 17, 2014)	Blake Shelton	2	Jake Worthington	"It Goes Like This"	Lexi Luca	—	—	—	—N/a
Episode 7^{1} (Monday, March 17, 2014)	Shakira	3	Dani Moz	"My Kind of Love"	DeShawn Washington	—	—N/a	—	—
Episode 7^{1} (Monday, March 17, 2014)	Adam Levine	4	Kat Perkins	"Whenever I Call You 'Friend'"	Patrick Thomson	—N/a	✔	—	—
Episode 7^{1} (Monday, March 17, 2014)	Blake Shelton	5	Sisaundra Lewis	"Do What U Want"	Paula DeAnda	—	—	—	—N/a
Episode 7^{1} (Monday, March 17, 2014)	Usher	6	Stevie Jo	"Higher Love"	Jake Barker	✔	✔	—N/a	✔
Episode 8^{2} (Tuesday, March 18, 2014)	Shakira	1	Clarissa Serna	"Cold as Ice"	Jeremy Briggs	—	—N/a	—	—
Episode 8^{2} (Tuesday, March 18, 2014)	Adam Levine	2	Delvin Choice	"The Man"	Caleb Elder	—N/a	—	—	—
Episode 8^{2} (Tuesday, March 18, 2014)	Blake Shelton	3	Megan Rüger	"My Happy Ending"	Ria Eaton	—	—	—	—N/a
Episode 8^{2} (Tuesday, March 18, 2014)	Shakira	4	Ddendyl	"I Feel the Earth Move"	Lindsay Pagano	—	—N/a	—	—
Episode 8^{2} (Tuesday, March 18, 2014)	Usher	5	Morgan Wallen	"Hey Brother"	Brothers Walker	—	—	—N/a	—
Episode 8^{2} (Tuesday, March 18, 2014)	Usher	6	Melissa Jiménez	"Give It to Me Right"	Brittnee Camelle	✔	✔	—N/a	—
Episode 9^{1} (Monday, March 24, 2014)	Adam Levine	1	Josh Kaufman	"Happy"	Austin Ellis	Team full	—	—	—
Episode 9^{1} (Monday, March 24, 2014)	Blake Shelton	2	Audra McLaughlin	"When Will I Be Loved"	Alaska & Madi	Team full	—	—	—N/a
Episode 9^{1} (Monday, March 24, 2014)	Shakira	3	Deja Hall	"Eternal Flame"	Music Box	Team full	—N/a	✔	—
Episode 9^{1} (Monday, March 24, 2014)	Usher	4	Madilyn Paige	"Everything Has Changed"	Tanner James	Team full	—	—N/a	—
Episode 9^{1} (Monday, March 24, 2014)	Adam Levine	5	Dawn and Hawkes	"Stuck in the Middle with You"	Josh Murley	Team full	✔	—	—
Episode 9^{1} (Monday, March 24, 2014)	Usher	6	Bria Kelly	"Piece of My Heart"	Tess Boyer	Team full	Team full	—N/a	✔
Episode 10^{2} (Tuesday, March 25, 2014)	Adam Levine	1	Sam Behymer	"Give Me Love"	Cary Laine	Team full	Team full	—	Team full
Episode 10^{2} (Tuesday, March 25, 2014)	Blake Shelton	2	Kaleigh Glanton	"Everything"	Noah Lis	Team full	Team full	—	Team full
Episode 10^{2} (Tuesday, March 25, 2014)	Blake Shelton	3	Ryan Whyte Maloney	"What's Love Got to Do with It"	Cali Tucker	Team full	Team full	—	Team full
Episode 10^{2} (Tuesday, March 25, 2014)	Adam Levine	4	Christina Grimmie	"I Knew You Were Trouble"	Joshua Howard	Team full	Team full	—	Team full
Episode 10^{2} (Tuesday, March 25, 2014)	Shakira	5	Kristen Merlin	"Turn On the Radio"	Lindsay Bruce	Team full	Team full	—	Team full
Episode 10^{2} (Tuesday, March 25, 2014)	Shakira	6	Emily B.	"Brave"	Cierra Mickens	Team full	Team full	✔	Team full

=== Round 2 ===
In season six, the Knockout Round was replaced by a second round of Battles, dubbed "The Battles, Round 2," which took place during episodes 14–16 on March 31, April 1, and April 7 respectively. Unlike the first round of The Battles, each team will share the same advisor, Coldplay frontman Chris Martin. Coaches give each Battle pairing a list of songs and each pair must agree on which song to sing. Each coach is allowed one steal this round, like the Knockout round of previous seasons.

Color key:

Artist won the Battle and advanced to the Playoffs
Artist lost the Battle but was stolen by another coach and advanced to the Playoffs
Artist lost the Battle and was eliminated

==== Week 3 & 4 ====
Episode	Coach	Order	Winner	Song	Loser	'Steal' result			
Episode	Coach	Order	Winner	Song	Loser	Adam	Shakira	Usher	Blake
Episode 13 ^{1} (Monday, March 31, 2014)	Blake Shelton	1	Audra McLaughlin	"The Climb"	Megan Rüger	—	—	—	—N/a
Episode 13 ^{1} (Monday, March 31, 2014)	Usher	2	T.J. Wilkins	"Get Here"	Cierra Mickens	—	—	—N/a	—
Episode 13 ^{1} (Monday, March 31, 2014)	Blake Shelton	3	Jake Worthington	"Have a Little Faith in Me"	Tess Boyer	✔	✔	✔	—N/a
Episode 13 ^{1} (Monday, March 31, 2014)	Adam Levine	4	Christina Grimmie	"Counting Stars"	Sam Behymer	—N/a	Team full	—	—
Episode 13 ^{1} (Monday, March 31, 2014)	Shakira	5	Patrick Thomson	"Run to You"	Josh Murley	—	Team full	—	—
Episode 13 ^{1} (Monday, March 31, 2014)	Adam Levine	6	Delvin Choice	"Signed, Sealed, Delivered I'm Yours"	Josh Kaufman	—N/a	Team full	✔	—
Episode 14^{2} (Tuesday, April 1, 2014)	Blake Shelton	1	Sisaundra Lewis	"It's a Man's Man's Man's World"	Biff Gore	—	Team full	Team full	—N/a
Episode 14^{2} (Tuesday, April 1, 2014)	Shakira	2	Deja Hall	"Say Something"	Ddendyl	—	Team full	Team full	—
Episode 14^{2} (Tuesday, April 1, 2014)	Shakira	3	Kristen Merlin	"I Can Love You Better"	Emily B.	—	Team full	Team full	—
Episode 14^{2} (Tuesday, April 1, 2014)	Usher	4	Stevie Jo	"Story of My Life"	Morgan Wallen	✔	Team full	Team full	—
Episode 15^{1} (Monday, April 7, 2014)	Shakira	1	Dani Moz	"Perfect"	Clarissa Serna	Team full	Team full	Team full	—
Episode 15^{1} (Monday, April 7, 2014)	Adam Levine	2	Kat Perkins	"Suddenly I See"	Dawn and Hawkes	Team full	Team full	Team full	—
Episode 15^{1} (Monday, April 7, 2014)	Usher	3	Melissa Jiménez	"Girl on Fire"	Music Box	Team full	Team full	Team full	—
Episode 15^{1} (Monday, April 7, 2014)	Blake Shelton	4	Ryan Whyte Maloney	"Easy"	Kaleigh Glanton	Team full	Team full	Team full	—N/a
Episode 15^{1} (Monday, April 7, 2014)	Adam Levine	5	Jake Barker	"Climax"	Brittnee Camelle	Team full	Team full	Team full	—
Episode 15^{1} (Monday, April 7, 2014)	Usher	6	Bria Kelly	"I'll Stand By You"	Madilyn Paige	Team full	Team full	Team full	✔

== The Playoffs ==
The Playoffs began on April 8 and comprised episodes 16 to 18. The season six Playoffs were prerecorded and did not have the interactive viewer component, and therefore no subsequent results shows. The top twenty artists performed for the coaches; there was no public vote (hence no iTunes bonus or Instant Save) in the playoffs. Instead, each of the coaches selected two of their own artists to eliminate.

Color key:

Artist was chosen by their coach
Artist was eliminated

Episode	Coach	Order	Artist	Song	Result
Episode 16^{2} (Tuesday, April 8, 2014)	Blake Shelton	1	Audra McLaughlin	"A Broken Wing"	Advanced
Episode 16^{2} (Tuesday, April 8, 2014)	Blake Shelton	2	Ryan Whyte Maloney	"Second Chance"	Eliminated
Episode 16^{2} (Tuesday, April 8, 2014)	Blake Shelton	3	Madilyn Paige	"Clarity"	Eliminated
Episode 16^{2} (Tuesday, April 8, 2014)	Blake Shelton	4	Jake Worthington	"Anywhere with You"	Advanced
Episode 16^{2} (Tuesday, April 8, 2014)	Blake Shelton	5	Sisaundra Lewis	"New York State of Mind"	Advanced
Episode 17^{1} (Monday, April 14, 2014)	Shakira	1	Kristen Merlin	"Two Black Cadillacs"	Advanced
Episode 17^{1} (Monday, April 14, 2014)	Shakira	2	Deja Hall	"Battlefield"	Eliminated
Episode 17^{1} (Monday, April 14, 2014)	Shakira	3	Tess Boyer	"Human"	Advanced
Episode 17^{1} (Monday, April 14, 2014)	Shakira	4	Patrick Thomson	"Trouble"	Eliminated
Episode 17^{1} (Monday, April 14, 2014)	Shakira	5	Dani Moz	"The Edge of Glory"	Advanced
Episode 17^{1} (Monday, April 14, 2014)	Adam Levine	6	Delvin Choice	"Let's Stay Together"	Advanced
Episode 17^{1} (Monday, April 14, 2014)	Adam Levine	7	Jake Barker	"She Will Be Loved"	Eliminated
Episode 17^{1} (Monday, April 14, 2014)	Adam Levine	8	Kat Perkins	"Open Arms"	Advanced
Episode 17^{1} (Monday, April 14, 2014)	Adam Levine	9	Morgan Wallen	"Stay"	Eliminated
Episode 17^{1} (Monday, April 14, 2014)	Adam Levine	10	Christina Grimmie	"I Won't Give Up"	Advanced
Episode 18^{2} (Tuesday, April 15, 2014)	Usher	1	T.J. Wilkins	"Tell Me Something Good"	Advanced
Episode 18^{2} (Tuesday, April 15, 2014)	Usher	2	Melissa Jiménez	"Halo"	Eliminated
Episode 18^{2} (Tuesday, April 15, 2014)	Usher	3	Stevie Jo	"The Thrill Is Gone"	Eliminated
Episode 18^{2} (Tuesday, April 15, 2014)	Usher	4	Bria Kelly	"Wild Horses"	Advanced
Episode 18^{2} (Tuesday, April 15, 2014)	Usher	5	Josh Kaufman	"It Will Rain"	Advanced

^1 Episodes airing on Monday had a running time of two hours.
^2 Episodes airing on Tuesday & Sunday had a running time of one hour.

== Live shows ==
The live shows is the final phase of the competition, consisting of five weekly shows and the season finale. For season six, the show expanded upon the "Instant Save" introduced in season five; once the three artists with the lowest vote totals are announced during the results show (except the Live Finale), each of those three artists sing an additional song before the Twitter voting window opens. Also, "Instant Save" vote totals are shown in a ticker bar onscreen during its five-minute voting window (including throughout the commercial break) to update viewers on each contestant's percentage of votes.

Color key:

Artist was saved by the Public's votes
Artist was in the bottom three/bottom four
Artist was saved by the Instant Save
Artist's iTunes vote multiplied by 5 (except The Finals) after his/her studio version of the song reached iTunes top 10
Artist was eliminated

=== Week 1 (April 21 & 22) ===
The Top 12 performed on Monday, April 21, 2014, with results following Tuesday, April 22, 2014.

Josh Kaufman received the first iTunes bonus multiplier of the season, with his studio recording of "Stay With Me" charting at #5 on the iTunes Top 200 Singles chart at the close of the voting window.

Episode	Coach	Order	Artist	Song	Result
Episode 20 (Monday, April 21, 2014)	Usher	1	Bria Kelly	"Rolling in the Deep"	Public's vote
Episode 20 (Monday, April 21, 2014)	Adam Levine	2	Delvin Choice	"Unchained Melody"	Public's vote
Episode 20 (Monday, April 21, 2014)	Shakira	3	Dani Moz	"Just Give Me a Reason"	Bottom three
Episode 20 (Monday, April 21, 2014)	Blake Shelton	4	Audra McLaughlin	"Angel of the Morning"	Public's vote
Episode 20 (Monday, April 21, 2014)	Usher	5	T.J. Wilkins	"Waiting on the World to Change"	Bottom three
Episode 20 (Monday, April 21, 2014)	Adam Levine	6	Christina Grimmie	"Dark Horse"	Public's vote
Episode 20 (Monday, April 21, 2014)	Blake Shelton	7	Sisaundra Lewis	"Don't Let the Sun Go Down On Me"	Public's vote
Episode 20 (Monday, April 21, 2014)	Shakira	8	Kristen Merlin	"Stay"	Public's vote
Episode 20 (Monday, April 21, 2014)	Adam Levine	9	Kat Perkins	"Magic Man"	Public's vote
Episode 20 (Monday, April 21, 2014)	Blake Shelton	10	Jake Worthington	"Anymore"	Public's vote
Episode 20 (Monday, April 21, 2014)	Shakira	11	Tess Boyer	"I'll Be There for You"	Bottom three
Episode 20 (Monday, April 21, 2014)	Usher	12	Josh Kaufman	"Stay with Me"	Public's vote
Episode 21 (Tuesday, April 22, 2014)	Instant Save performances				
Episode 21 (Tuesday, April 22, 2014)	Usher	1	T.J. Wilkins	"I'll Be"	Eliminated
Episode 21 (Tuesday, April 22, 2014)	Shakira	2	Dani Moz	"Turning Tables"	Eliminated
Episode 21 (Tuesday, April 22, 2014)	Shakira	3	Tess Boyer	"Dark Side"	Instant Save

Non-competition performances
Order	Performer	Song
21.1	Adam Levine and his team (Christina Grimmie, Delvin Choice and Kat Perkins)	"Sledgehammer"
21.2	Shakira	"Empire"
21.3	Blake Shelton & his team (Audra McLaughlin, Sisaundra Lewis, and Jake Worthington)	"Put Some Drive in Your Country"

=== Week 2 (April 28 & 29) ===
The Top 10 performed on Monday, April 28, 2014, with results following Tuesday, April 29, 2014.

This week iTunes multiplier bonuses were awarded to Christina Grimmie (#4). The eliminations for Bria Kelly and Tess Boyer marked only the second time a pair that were put against each other in the battles were eliminated together in the Top 10.

Episode	Coach	Order	Artist	Song	Result
Episode 22 (Monday, April 28, 2014)	Adam Levine	1	Kat Perkins	"Landslide"	Bottom three
Episode 22 (Monday, April 28, 2014)	Shakira	2	Tess Boyer	"Ain't It Fun"	Bottom three
Episode 22 (Monday, April 28, 2014)	Blake Shelton	3	Audra McLaughlin	"You Lie"	Public's vote
Episode 22 (Monday, April 28, 2014)	Usher	4	Josh Kaufman	"This Is It"	Public's vote
Episode 22 (Monday, April 28, 2014)	Adam Levine	5	Christina Grimmie	"Hold On, We're Going Home"	Public's vote
Episode 22 (Monday, April 28, 2014)	Blake Shelton	6	Jake Worthington	"Run"	Public's vote
Episode 22 (Monday, April 28, 2014)	Usher	7	Bria Kelly	"I'm with You"	Bottom three
Episode 22 (Monday, April 28, 2014)	Adam Levine	8	Delvin Choice	"Bright Lights"	Public's Vote
Episode 22 (Monday, April 28, 2014)	Shakira	9	Kristen Merlin	"Let Her Go"	Public's Vote
Episode 22 (Monday, April 28, 2014)	Blake Shelton	10	Sisaundra Lewis	"Oh Sherrie"	Public's vote
Episode 23 (Tuesday, April 29, 2014)
Episode 23 (Tuesday, April 29, 2014)	Instant Save performances				
Episode 23 (Tuesday, April 29, 2014)	Usher	1	Bria Kelly	"Crazy on You"	Eliminated
Episode 23 (Tuesday, April 29, 2014)	Shakira	2	Tess Boyer	"Who Knew"	Eliminated
Episode 23 (Tuesday, April 29, 2014)	Adam Levine	3	Kat Perkins	"Paris (Ooh La La)"	Instant Save

Non-competition performances
Order	Performer	Song
22.1	Rixton	"Me and My Broken Heart"
23.1	Usher & his team (Josh Kaufman and Bria Kelly)	"Always on the Run"
23.2	Shakira & her team (Tess Boyer and Kristen Merlin)	"The One Thing"

=== Week 3: Quarterfinals (May 5 & 6) ===
The Top 8 performed on Monday, May 5, 2014, with results broadcast Tuesday, May 6, 2014. Upcoming coaches for season seven, Gwen Stefani and Pharrell Williams, performed "Hollaback Girl" and "Come Get It Bae" respectively. This week's result show featured had three artists eliminated instead of two, and thus there was a bottom four instead of a bottom three.

iTunes bonus multipliers were awarded to Josh Kaufman (#2) and Grimmie (#5). For the first time since the inclusion of the Instant Save, a contestant was saved for two consecutive weeks.

Episode	Coach	Order	Artist	Song	Result
Episode 24 (Monday, May 5, 2014)	Blake Shelton	1	Sisaundra Lewis	"River Deep Mountain High"	Bottom four
Episode 24 (Monday, May 5, 2014)	Usher	2	Josh Kaufman	"I Can't Make You Love Me"	Public's vote
Episode 24 (Monday, May 5, 2014)	Adam Levine	3	Kat Perkins	"Get Lucky"	Bottom four
Episode 24 (Monday, May 5, 2014)	Shakira	4	Kristen Merlin	"I Drive Your Truck"	Public's vote
Episode 24 (Monday, May 5, 2014)	Adam Levine	5	Delvin Choice	"I Believe I Can Fly"	Bottom four
Episode 24 (Monday, May 5, 2014)	Blake Shelton	6	Audra McLaughlin	"Forgive"	Bottom four
Episode 24 (Monday, May 5, 2014)	Blake Shelton	7	Jake Worthington	"Hillbilly Deluxe"	Public's vote
Episode 24 (Monday, May 5, 2014)	Adam Levine	8	Christina Grimmie	"How to Love"	Public's vote
Episode 25 (Tuesday, May 6, 2014)	Instant Save performances				
Episode 25 (Tuesday, May 6, 2014)	Blake Shelton	1	Sisaundra Lewis	"(You Make Me Feel Like) A Natural Woman"	Eliminated
Episode 25 (Tuesday, May 6, 2014)	Blake Shelton	2	Audra McLaughlin	"Done"	Eliminated
Episode 25 (Tuesday, May 6, 2014)	Adam Levine	3	Kat Perkins	"Barracuda"	Instant Save
Episode 25 (Tuesday, May 6, 2014)	Adam Levine	4	Delvin Choice	"Young Girls"	Eliminated

Non-competition performances
Order	Performer	Song
24.1	Blake Shelton feat. Gwen Sebastian	"My Eyes"
24.2	Pharrell Williams	"Come Get It Bae"
24.3	Gwen Stefani feat. Pharrell Williams	"Hollaback Girl"
25.1	Audra McLaughlin, Jake Worthington, Kristen Merlin, and Kat Perkins	"Chainsaw"
25.2	Sisaundra Lewis, Delvin Choice, Josh Kaufman, and Christina Grimmie	"Latch"

=== Week 4: Semifinals (May 12 & 13) ===
The Top 5 performed on Monday, May 12, 2014, with results following Tuesday, May 13, 2014. This week, each contestant sang two songs; one chosen by their coach, and another selected in tribute to their supporters. The top three season five finalists, (Tessanne Chin, Jacquie Lee, and Will Champlin) debuted their newest singles during the results show.

This week's iTunes bonus multipliers was awarded to Jake Worthington (#3), Josh Kaufman (#4), and Kristen Merlin (#6).

With the elimination of Merlin, Shakira no longer has any contestants remaining on her team.

Episode	Coach	Artist	Order	Song (Contestant's Choice)	Order	Song (Coach's Choice)	Result
Episode 26 (Monday, May 12, 2014)	Shakira	Kristen Merlin	1	"Gunpowder & Lead"	8	"Foolish Games"	Bottom three
Episode 26 (Monday, May 12, 2014)	Usher	Josh Kaufman	2	"All of Me"	6	"Love Runs Out"	Public's vote
Episode 26 (Monday, May 12, 2014)	Adam Levine	Kat Perkins	7	"Let It Go"	3	"Chandelier"	Bottom three
Episode 26 (Monday, May 12, 2014)	Blake Shelton	Jake Worthington	4	"Good Ol' Boys"	10	"Heaven"	Public's vote
Episode 26 (Monday, May 12, 2014)	Adam Levine	Christina Grimmie	9	"Some Nights"	5	"Hide and Seek"	Bottom three
Episode 27 (Tuesday, May 13, 2014)
Episode 27 (Tuesday, May 13, 2014)	Instant Save performances						
Episode 27 (Tuesday, May 13, 2014)	Coach	Artist	Order	Song			Result
Episode 27 (Tuesday, May 13, 2014)	Shakira	Kristen Merlin	1	"Blown Away"			Eliminated
Episode 27 (Tuesday, May 13, 2014)	Adam Levine	Kat Perkins	2	"Good Girl"			Eliminated
Episode 27 (Tuesday, May 13, 2014)	Adam Levine	Christina Grimmie	3	"Apologize"			Instant Save

Non-competition performances
Order	Performer	Song
26.1	Usher	"Good Kisser"
27.1	Rascal Flatts	"Rewind"
27.2	Jacquie Lee	"Broken Ones"
27.3	Will Champlin	"Eye of the Pyramid"
27.4	Tessanne Chin	"Everything Reminds Me of You"

=== Week 5: Finale (May 19 & 20) ===
The Final Three performed on Monday, May 19, 2014, with the season finale on Tuesday, May 20, 2014. Performances in this round consist of a "fans choice" reprise performance of a song from earlier in the season, a duet with the respective coach, and a solo song. This was the latest season to feature a final three competing in the finale.

While Grimmie (#3 and #8) and Worthington (#6, #7 and #9) had singles peaked into the top 10 at the close of the voting window, however, a technical glitch in the iTunes system caused all of the iTunes votes cast being invalidated, but net results were neither affected by it.

With the victory of Josh Kaufman, this is the first time in The Voice history where a stolen artist won an entire season. His victory also marks the only win of Usher as a coach.

Coach	Artist	Order	Reprise song	Order	Duet song (with Coach)	Order	Solo song	Result
Adam Levine	Christina Grimmie	1	"Wrecking Ball"	5	"Somebody That I Used to Know"	8	"Can't Help Falling in Love"	Third place
Usher	Josh Kaufman	4	"Signed, Sealed, Delivered I'm Yours"	2	"Every Breath You Take"	9	"Set Fire to the Rain"	Winner
Blake Shelton	Jake Worthington	3	"Don't Close Your Eyes"	7	"A Country Boy Can Survive"	6	"Right Here Waiting"	Runner-up

Non-competition performances
Order	Performer	Song
28.1	Shakira feat. Blake Shelton	"Medicine"
28.2	Usher and Adam Levine	"Untitled (How Does It Feel)"
29.1	OneRepublic	"Love Runs Out"
29.2	Jake Worthington with Audra McLaughlin, Kat Perkins, Kristen Merlin, Morgan Wallen & Ryan Whyte Maloney	"Summertime"
29.3	Christina Grimmie & Ed Sheeran	"All of the Stars"
29.4	Delvin Choice, Jake Barker, Morgan Wallen, Patrick Thomson & Stevie Jo	"She's Gone"
29.5	Justin Moore	"Lettin' the Night Roll"
29.6	Josh Kaufman with Sisaundra Lewis, Stevie Jo & TJ Wilkins	"Am I Wrong"
29.7	Ed Sheeran	"Sing"
29.8	Jake Worthington & Alabama	"Mountain Music"
29.9	Dani Moz, Deja Hall, Madilyn Paige, Melissa Jimenez & Tess Boyer	"Umbrella"
29.10	Josh Kaufman & Robin Thicke	"Get Her Back"
29.11	Tim McGraw	"City Lights"
29.12	Christina Grimmie with Bria Kelly, Jake Barker & Tess Boyer	"Team"
29.13	Coldplay	"A Sky Full of Stars"

== Elimination chart ==
=== Overall ===
Color key
Artist's info

- Team Adam
- Team Shakira
- Team Usher
- Team Blake

Result details

- Winner
- Runner-up
- Third place
- Saved by Instant Save (via Twitter)
- Artist was saved by the public
- Artist was eliminated

Live show results per week
Artist	Week 1	Week 2	Week 3	Week 4	Week 5 Finale
Josh Kaufman	Safe	Safe	Safe	Safe	Winner
Jake Worthington	Safe	Safe	Safe	Safe	Runner-up
Christina Grimmie	Safe	Safe	Safe	Safe	3rd Place
Kristen Merlin	Safe	Safe	Safe	Eliminated	Eliminated (Week 4)
Kat Perkins	Safe	Safe	Safe	Eliminated	Eliminated (Week 4)
Audra McLaughlin	Safe	Safe	Eliminated	Eliminated (Week 3)	
Delvin Choice	Safe	Safe	Eliminated	Eliminated (Week 3)	
Sisaundra Lewis	Safe	Safe	Eliminated	Eliminated (Week 3)	
Bria Kelly	Safe	Eliminated	Eliminated (Week 2)		
Tess Boyer	Safe	Eliminated	Eliminated (Week 2)		
T.J. Wilkins	Eliminated	Eliminated (Week 1)			
Dani Moz	Eliminated	Eliminated (Week 1)			

=== Team ===
Color key:

Artist's info

- Team Adam
- Team Shakira
- Team Usher
- Team Blake

Result details

- Winner
- Runner-up
- Third place
- Eliminated
- Saved by Instant Save (via Twitter)
- Artist received one or more iTunes bonus that week
- Number of iTunes bonuses received
- Teams are in 3 artists
- No artists remaining on his/her team

Artist	Week 1	Week 2	Week 3	Week 4	Week 5 Finale
Christina Grimmie	Advanced	Advanced	Advanced	Advanced	Third Place
Kat Perkins	Advanced	Advanced	Advanced	Eliminated	
Delvin Choice	Advanced	Advanced	Eliminated		
Kristen Merlin	Advanced	Advanced	Advanced	Eliminated	
Tess Boyer	Advanced	Eliminated			
Dani Moz	Eliminated				
Josh Kaufman	Advanced	Advanced	Advanced	Advanced	Winner
Bria Kelly	Advanced	Eliminated			
T.J. Wilkins	Eliminated				
Jake Worthington	Advanced	Advanced	Advanced	Advanced	Runner-up
Sisaundra Lewis	Advanced	Advanced	Eliminated		
Audra McLaughlin	Advanced	Advanced	Eliminated		

Rank	Coach	Top 12	Top 10	Top 8	Top 5	Top 3
1	Usher	3	2	1	1	1
2	Blake Shelton	3	3	3	1	1
3	Adam Levine	3	3	3	2	1
4	Shakira	3	2	1	1	0

== Performances by guests/coaches ==
Episode	Show segment	Performer(s)	Title	Reaction		Source
Episode	Show segment	Performer(s)	Title	Hot 100	Hot digital	Source
21	Top 12 Results	Shakira	"Empire"	71 (+26)	37 (Re-entry)	
22	Top 10 Performs	Rixton	"Me and My Broken Heart"	14 (+15)	7 (+18)	
24	Top 8 Performs	Blake Shelton ft. Gwen Sebastian	"My Eyes"	57 (+40)	28 (Debut)	
24	Top 8 Performs	Pharrell Williams	"Come Get It Bae"	82 (Debut)	35 (Debut)	
24	Top 8 Performs	Gwen Stefani ft. Pharrell Williams	"Hollaback Girl"	Did not chart	Did not chart	
26	Top 5 Performs	Usher	"Good Kisser"	70 (Debut)	TBA	
27	Top 5 Results	Rascal Flatts	"Rewind"	48 (+5)	TBA	
27	Top 5 Results	Jacquie Lee	"Broken Ones"	Did not chart	TBA	
27	Top 5 Results	Will Champlin	"Eye of the Pyramid"	Did not chart	TBA	
27	Top 5 Results	Tessanne Chin	"Everything Reminds Me of You"	Did not chart	TBA	
28	Final Performs	Shakira ft. Blake Shelton	"Medicine"	Did not chart	TBA	
29	Finale Results	OneRepublic	"Love Runs Out"	69 (Re-Entry)	TBA	
29	Finale Results	Ed Sheeran (with Christina Grimmie)	"All of the Stars"	Did not chart	TBA	
29	Finale Results	Justin Moore	"Lettin' the Night Roll"	64 (+2)	TBA	
29	Finale Results	Ed Sheeran	"Sing"	16 (-1)	TBA	
29	Finale Results	Robin Thicke (with Josh Kaufman)	"Get Her Back"	Did not chart	TBA	
29	Finale Results	Tim McGraw	"City Lights"	Did not chart	TBA	
29	Finale Results	Coldplay	"A Sky Full of Stars"	10 (+33)	TBA	

== Contestant appearances on other talent shows ==
- Josh Kaufman appeared on Star Search as a junior vocalist (1993).
- T.J. Wilkins was among the Top 6 finalists in ABC's High School Musical: Get in the Picture (2008).
- Bria Kelly appeared in season seven of America's Got Talent, making it to the semifinals.
- Delvin Choice and Jake Worthington sang in the blind auditions for season five, but failed to turn any chairs.
- Melissa Jiménez then went on to compete in season five of La Voz... México and joined team Alejandro. She finished as a top 8 finalist.
- Morgan Wallen later made a brief appearance on the December 3, 2018 episode of WWE RAW and has also been nominated for a CMT Music Award for Breakthrough Video of the Year, a Country Music Association Award for New Artist of the Year, and an Academy of Country Music Award for New Male Artist of the Year respectively. He also went on to have Platinum albums and multiple Platinum singles. Becoming a music superstar.
- Madilyn Paige appeared in season fifteen of American Idol, making it to the Hollywood Rounds. However, her performances did not air.

== Ratings ==
The season six premiere was watched by 15.86 million viewers with a 4.7 rating in the 18–49 demographic. It was up from last season's premiere by .88 million viewers.

Episode		Original airdate	Production	Timeslot (ET)	Viewers (in millions)	Adults (18–49)		Source
Episode		Original airdate	Production	Timeslot (ET)	Viewers (in millions)	Rating	Share	Source
1	"The Blind Auditions Premiere, Part 1"	February 24, 2014	601	Monday 8:00 p.m.	15.86	4.7	13	
2	"The Blind Auditions Premiere, Part 2"	February 25, 2014	602	Tuesday 8:00 p.m.	13.04	3.7	11	
3	"The Blind Auditions, Part 3"	March 3, 2014	603	Monday 8:00 p.m.	15.62	4.5	12	
4	"The Blind Auditions, Part 4"	March 4, 2014	604	Tuesday 8:00 p.m.	14.53	4.1	12	
5	"The Blind Auditions, Part 5"	March 10, 2014	605	Monday 8:00 p.m.	13.79	3.7	11	
6	"The Blind Auditions, Part 6"	March 11, 2014	606	Tuesday 8:00 p.m.	13.51	3.5	12	
7	"The Best of the Blind Auditions"	March 16, 2014	607	Sunday 7:00 p.m.	5.18	1.4	4	
8	"The Battles Premiere, Part 1"	March 17, 2014	608	Monday 8:00 p.m.	13.52	4.1	12	
9	"The Battles Premiere, Part 2"	March 18, 2014	609	Tuesday 8:00 p.m.	13.29	3.6	11	
10	"Recap: Battle Performances, Week 1"	March 23, 2014	610	Sunday 7:00 p.m.	3.33	0.8	2	
11	"The Battles, Part 3"	March 24, 2014	611	Monday 8:00 p.m.	12.85	3.7	10	
12	"The Battles, Part 4"	March 25, 2014	612	Tuesday 8:00 p.m.	12.45	3.4	11	
13	"Recap: Battle Performances, Week 2"	March 30, 2014	613	Sunday 7:00 p.m.	2.87	0.6	2	
14	"The Battles Round 2 Premiere, Part 1"	March 31, 2014	614	Monday 8:00 p.m.	12.28	3.4	10	
15	"The Battles, Round 2 Premiere, Part 2"	April 1, 2014	615	Tuesday 8:00 p.m.	11.93	3.1	10	
16	"The Battles, Round 2, Part 3"	April 7, 2014	616	Monday 8:00 p.m.	11.97	3.5	10	
17	"The Playoffs Premiere, Part 1"	April 8, 2014	617	Tuesday 8:00 p.m.	11.08	2.9	9	
18	"The Playoffs, Part 2"	April 14, 2014	618	Monday 8:00 p.m.	11.85	3.4	10	
19	"The Playoffs, Part 3"	April 15, 2014	619	Tuesday 8:00 p.m.	11.81	3.0	10	
20	"Live Top 12 Performance"	April 21, 2014	620	Monday 8:00 p.m.	11.19	3.0	9	
21	"Live Top 12 Results"	April 22, 2014	621	Tuesday 8:00 p.m.	11.29	2.8	9	
22	"Live Top 10 Performance"	April 28, 2014	622	Monday 8:00 p.m.	11.58	3.0	8	
23	"Live Top 10 Results"	April 29, 2014	623	Tuesday 8:00 p.m.	11.18	2.7	8	
24	"Live Quarterfinals Performance"	May 5, 2014	624	Monday 8:00 p.m.	11.00	3.0	9	
25	"Live Quarterfinals Results"	May 6, 2014	625	Tuesday 8:00 p.m.	10.72	2.5	8	
26	"Live Top 5 Semifinals Performance"	May 12, 2014	626	Monday 8:00 p.m.	11.12	3.0	9	
27	"Live Top 5 Semifinals Results"	May 13, 2014	627	Tuesday 8:00 p.m.	10.96	2.6	9	
28	"Live Finale Performance"	May 19, 2014	628	Monday 8:00 p.m.	11.70	3.2	10	
29	"Recap: Live Final Performance"	May 20, 2014	629	Tuesday 8:00 p.m.	7.52	1.9	7	
30	"Live Finale Results"	May 20, 2014	630	Tuesday 9:00 p.m.	11.69	3.3	10	
