= Broken Ones (disambiguation) =

"Broken Ones" is a 2014 song by Jacquie Lee.

Broken Ones may also refer to:

- Broken Ones (EP), a 2014 EP by Jacquie Lee
- "Broken Ones", a 2019 song by Illenium from Ascend
- "The Broken Ones", a 2011 song by Dia Frampton from Red
- The Broken Ones, a 2011 novel by Stephen M. Irwin
