= Josh Kaufman =

Josh Kaufman may refer to:

- Josh Kaufman (singer) (born 1976), American soul singer and songwriter
- Josh Kaufman (musician) (born 1978), American multi-instrumentalist, songwriter, producer, composer, arranger and engineer
