= Adalene =

American rock band

- Origin: Nashville, TN
- Genres: Rock
- Label: Unsigned
- Members: Brett Moyer; Josh Mitchell; Jonathan Stoye; Corey Rozzoni; Johannes Greer

Adalene is a Nashville, Tennessee-based rock band formed in the fall of 2009 featuring Brett Moyer (ex-Return to Self) on vocals, Josh Mitchell (Protea) on guitar/keys, Jonathan Stoye on bass, Corey Rozzoni (ex-Burden Brothers, Lights of Marfa) on guitar, and Jeremy Moore (ex-Faktion) on drums.

The band released their debut EP "Night On Fire" independently in 2010.

== Biography ==
Adalene is a rock band from Nashville, TN composed of Brett Moyer (ex-Return to Self) on vocals, Josh Mitchell (Protea) on guitar, Jonathan Stoye (Framing Hanely) on bass guitar, Corey "Rizzo" Rozzoni (ex-Burden Brothers, Lights of Marfa) on guitar, and Jeremy Moore (ex-3 Pill Morning/Faktion) on drums. The band performed mostly regionally but did play sporadically in the Midwest and South as well.

== Hiatus (2013-Present) ==
Shortly after the release of "Atlantic Heart", the band announced via Facebook that they would be taking a break. Citing the hiatus as amicable, the members embarked on various projects: bassist Jonathan Stoye joined Framing Hanely while guitarist Corey Rozzoni started a collaborative project called Lights of Marfa, and in May 2019 guitarist Josh Mitchell formed a rock/pop trio in Michigan called Protea.

In the fall of 2020, Rozzoni joined Nashville-based rock band, The Great Affairs. Their new record, his first with the band, "Sleepwalker" is set for release in late 2023.

In 2021 Stoye released his first solo album "Our Wooden Bed" and has since released several singles as well.

== Discography ==
=== EPs and singles ===
- Night On Fire (2010)
- Atlantic Heart (2013)

== Press ==
- Strum Magazine

== Television ==
- Not Just Country TV | NJCTV
