= Chris Hawkes =

American musician

- Born: Christopher Thomas Hawkes
- Genres: Rock; Americana; Indie folk
- Occupations: Singer-songwriter guitarist record producer recording engineer
- Instruments: Vocals guitar
- Years active: 1998–present
- Labels: Self-released, Republic
- Website: www.chrishawkesmusic.com

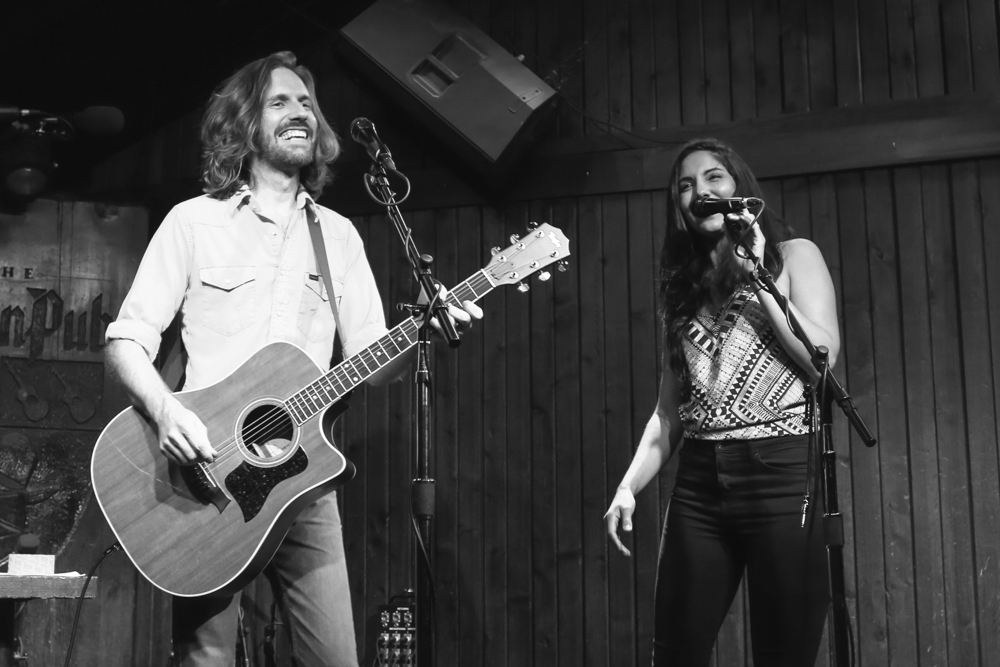
Hawkes and Miranda Dawn singing at the Saxon Pub in Austin, Texas (2018)

Chris Hawkes is a songwriter, singer, guitarist, recording engineer and producer. Hawkes performs with Miranda Dawn as the duo Dawn and Hawkes.

== Music career ==
=== Beginnings and bands ===
As a musician Chris Hawkes was first recorded and released on a 1998 compilation Garage Nights at Laser Trax released on Cannon Riggle Records.

Hawkes formed a band called Redtag while attending the University of North Texas.

Hawkes switched roles of frontman/songwriter to produce and play lead guitar for Five Times August, a previously solo project of singer-songwriter Brad Skistimas. The single "Better With You" was featured on MTV series Laguna Beach: The Real Orange County in its inaugural season.

A full length 2005 follow up album Fry Street, with performance and production by Hawkes, received more play on cable and broadcast television. In 2007 tracks from Something Clever and Fry Street were compiled and released as The Independent.

In 2005 Hawkes and other members, also known as Redtag, departed Five Times August and renamed as The Color Gray releasing 2005's self-titled EP and 2006 Control LP. The release of The Color Gray's full-length album Control was preceded with the single "Nothing to Lose" released to commercial rock radio KTBZ-FM, KLAQ, KNCN, KEYJ and playlist rotation on KDGE The Edge Dallas.

=== Solo career ===
In 2007 Chris Hawkes released his first solo acoustic album Guitar and Voice MTV featured "Falling Into Doubt" on episodes of the television series The Hills third and fourth season and on Animal Planet show Jockey's in 2008.

Hawkes released a second independent album Because I Feel That Way Too in 2009. Tracks from the album were pre-loaded in AT&T smart phones, featured on MTV's Teen Mom 2 and radio stations in the U.S.

While touring in 2010, Hawkes co-wrote and recorded "Mystery" with Annemarie Jensen, releasing the song on her debut album, Melodies and his third album, Broken Record. Shortly after its release, "Mystery" was added to rotation on Danish radio station DR P4. Texas Music magazine featured another track from Broken Record, "From Love (Momma Song)", in their winter 2012 issue, while the title track "Broken Record" was included on MTV series Teen Mom 2 and "Watch It Fall" and "Little Too Long" were featured in 90210.

== Dawn and Hawkes ==
In 2011, Miranda Dawn and Hawkes collaborated for the recording of Dawn's debut album, Reason to Feel Alive.

Dawn was recognized as a finalist in the Kerrville Folk Festival New Folk songwriting competition for her songs "Forever Happily" and "Made to Roam" and performed with Hawkes at the festival in May 2012. Dawn and Hawkes continued co-writing and touring together and released a collaborative effort, Golden Heart, in June 2012.

In 2013, the duo auditioned for season 6 of the American reality talent show The Voice. Their audition was broadcast on NBC on February 24, 2014. Adam Levine and Shakira pressed the "I Want You" button, turning their chairs.

Their iTunes single for "I've Just Seen A Face" charted No. 1 in iTunes Rock sales and No. 22 across all genres, selling 24,000 copies in the first week as a Billboard charts "Hot Shot Debut". Their previously released "Golden Heart" EP followed.

Dawn and Hawkes toured throughout 2014 including Levitt Pavilion in Arlington, Texas to capacity crowd, California tour and appearances on Season 7 of The Voice supporting their friend Luke Wade's audition, harmony vocals with Jimmy LaFave on Looking Into You: A Tribute to Jackson Browne, summer tour with Austin, TX singer-songwriter Bob Schneider, performances at Bass Performance Hall in Fort Worth, Texas, Austin City Limits soundstage at Moody Theater, Austin City Limits Music Festival, and performances with Chris Isaak, Patty Griffin, Jim Lauderdale, Robert Earl Keen, Hayes Carll and former host of The Tonight Show, Jay Leno.

The duo continued touring throughout 2015 with appearances at music festivals like Folk Alliance International and South by Southwest while recording their first full-length album Yours and Mine.

Dawn and Hawkes announced their marriage with the release of their new music video and single, "Yours and Mine", on August 21, 2015, via Huffington Post. Their full-length album, also titled Yours and Mine, went on sale October 2 and followed with a second video release "Almost Mine" from Texas Monthly, and third video for "Silver Line" from Acoustic Guitar.

Miranda Dawn and Chris Hawkes recorded music and vocals for Daytime Emmy Award winning 2016 StoryBots series Ask The Story Bots and StoryBots Super Songs

Dawn and Hawkes appeared, individually and together, in the 2017 documentary film, Albert E. Brumley: Songwriter of the Ozarks

The duo stored their possessions and lived on the road full-time while starting their second full-length album The Other Side, released July 6, 2018. The first video from the album, 'Trees' premiered on Billboard.

== Recording and producing career ==
Hawkes studied audio engineering at the Dallas Sound Lab in Las Colinas, interned with Grammy Award winning producer Eric Delegard and became an engineer for the University of North Texas College of Music.

In 2004, Hawkes established One Road Studio, for the recording and production of his own bands and other regional acts. In 2006 Hawkes partnered with Disclive, a Dallas-based recording company, to record live performances of Thirty Seconds to Mars, Flyleaf, The Toadies, Sonic Youth, Cooder Graw, Spoonfed Tribe, and Edgewater.

== Discography ==
=== Albums ===
Released	Album title	Album/ EP	Artist	Singles/Feature track
2004	Something Clever	EP	Five Times August	"Better With You"
2005	Fry Street	Album	Five Times August	
2005	The Color Gray	EP	The Color Gray	
2006	Control	Album	The Color Gray	"Nothing to Lose"
2007	The Independent	Compilation album	Five Times August	
2007	Guitar and Voice	Album	Chris Hawkes	"Falling Into Doubt"
2009	Because I Feel That Way Too	Album	Chris Hawkes	"Again" "Falling Into Doubt" "Finally Free"
2011	Broken Record	Album	Chris Hawkes	"Mystery" (with Annemarie Jensen) "From Love (Momma Song)"
2012	Golden Heart	EP	Dawn and Hawkes	No. 25 Billboard Folk, No. 31 Top Heatseekers
2015	Yours and Mine	Album	Dawn and Hawkes	No. 5 Roots Music Report Folk Album Chart
2018	The Other Side	Album	Dawn and Hawkes	No. 8 Roots Music Report Folk and Contemporary Folk Album Charts

=== Singles ===
- "I've Just Seen A Face" (2014 Republic Records) No. 13 Rock Digital Singles No. 22 Bubbling Under Hot 100 Singles
- "Stuck in the Middle with You" (2014 Republic Records)

=== Produced / Engineered / Mixed Albums / EPs ===
Released	Album title	Artist	Record producer	Engineer	Mixer	Session musician
2004	Something Clever	Five Times August	check	check	check	check
2004	Leaving Stella	Darby	check	check	check	check
2005	Fry Street	Five Times August	check	check	check	check
2005	The Color Gray	The Color Gray	check	check	check	check
2006	Time Stands Still	Crimson Soul	check	check	check	check
2006	Edgefest 15: Ripped	Thirty Seconds to Mars / Flyleaf		check		
2006	Acoustic Campfire with Rock 108	KEYJ / Edgewater		check	check	
2006	(unreleased EP)	Faktion	check	check	check	check
2006	Exit 380: Live at Firewater	Exit 380		check	check	
2006	Cooder Graw: Live at Firewater	Cooder Graw		check	check	
2006	Spoonfed Tribe: Live at Firewater	Spoonfed Tribe		check	check	
2007	Guitar and Voice	Chris Hawkes	check	check	check	check
2007	Life is a Cigarette	Better Than Sex	check	check	check	check
2007	Rock Show	The Toadies		check	check	
2007	Dartmyth	Dartmyth	check	check	check	
2007	Life.Love.Travel	Lance Sitton	check	check	check	check
2007	The Independent (l.p.)	Five Times August	check	check	check	check
2008	Lisa Apple	Lisa Apple	check	check	check	check
2008	Killing Caroline	Killing Caroline	check	check	check	check
2008	Flu Sessions	Opium Symphony	check	check	check	
2008	Ignite What's Inside	Faktion	check	check	check	check
2008	The Rankin Twins	The Rankin Twins	check	check	check	check
2008	In Your Head/Waiting	Dartmyth	check	check	check	check
2008	Home Again	Jeff Metil	check	check	check	check
2009	Because I Feel That Way Too	Chris Hawkes	check	check	check	check
2009	Adam's Orchard	Zach Arrington	check	check	check	check
2009	Songland	Colin de los Santos	check	check	check	check
2010	The Rising Sun	Philip Q. Morrow	check	check	check	check
2011	Broken Record	Chris Hawkes	check	check	check	check
2011	Reason to Feel Alive	Miranda Dawn	check	check	check	check
2012	Golden Heart	Dawn and Hawkes	check	check	check	check
2013	The Cabin Sessions	Ben Smith			check	
2015	Yours and Mine	Dawn and Hawkes	check	check	check	check
2016	Lost Luggage	Lost Luggage	check	check	check	check
2016	Unladylike	Summer Dean		check	check	check
2018	The Other Side	Dawn and Hawkes	check	check	check	check

=== Filmography ===
Year	Title	Role	Type
2014	NBC The Voice	Himself/Musician	TV series
2015	Longhorn Network Sessions from the Cactus Cafe	Himself/Musician	TV series
2016	Texas Music Scene TV w/Ray Benson and Jack Ingram	Himself/Musician	TV series
2016	Ask The StoryBots	Musician/Engineer	TV series
2016	StoryBots Super Songs	Musician/Engineer	TV series
2017	Albert E. Brumley: Songwriter of the Ozarks	Himself/Songwriter	Documentary Film
