= Sisaundra Lewis =

American singer

- Born: October 8, 1970 (age 55); Lake Hamilton, Florida, U.S.
- Genres: Soul, R&B
- Occupations: TV Host, Singer

Sisaundra Lewis is an American singer, songwriter and producer from Haines City, Florida. She was a contestant on season 6 of the US series The Voice as a member of Blake Shelton's team. Sisaundra is currently the Producer and Host of 2 television shows on AFRO TV, an Afrotainment cable television network: The Sisaundra Show and AFROJAms a Live music performance television show.

== Cable Television career ==
Sisaundra started her television career in 2019 when she was added as a co-host of AFRO TV daytime talk show for women, Point Of View. In 2021 she created and still hosts AFROJams; a monthly Live Music performance that has featured Grammy Award winning artists such as BeBe Winans, Tye Tribbett & Israel Houghton, to name a few. In September 2021 she was offered the opportunity to host her own daytime cable television talk show entitled The Sisaundra Show; currently in its second season. The Sisaundra show has recorded and broadcast over 200 episodes nationwide and is available daily at 7:00 PM on AFRO TV Comcast Xfinity Channel 1623.

== Singing career ==
Born as one of eight children, Lewis grew up in Lake Hamilton, Florida singing in her father's church.

She had a singing career in the 2000s. She was invited by Peabo Bryson to join his international tour as a backing vocalist and new duet partner. She was backing vocalist, vocal director and choreographer with Céline Dion.

On September 10, 2005 she scored her first number-one U.S. Billboard Hot Dance Club Play chart with her debut single "Shout" followed by a same titled album in 2006 on Global Records label, in both credited under the mononym Sisaundra.

Sisaundra is of African American, Gullah, Nigerian descent also.

== Songwriting and production career ==
She co-wrote "Emotional" in Najee's album My Point of View. The album reached number-one on Billboard Contemporary Jazz Chart.

Her producer/writer credits include work with Gordon Chambers, Sean "Puff Daddy" Combs, Emilio Estefan, David Foster, Phil Galdston, Marvin Hamlisch, Tony Hemmings, Loris Holland, Tony Moran, Rohan Reid, Jim Steinman, Sting, Ric Wake and Sir Andrew Lloyd Webber.

She performed with Cirque du Soleil's show La Nouba in 2003 and from 2007-2014. She is also featured on the La Nouba DVD, filmed live in 2003.

In 2009, she was narrator in the documentary Sustaining Life written and directed by Robert Hess. The film was nominated for a 2009 Academy Award - in the Student Documentary category.

== The Voice ==
In 2014, she auditioned for season 6 of the US The Voice. Her audition performing Aretha Franklin's song "Ain't No Way" was broadcast during the third episode of the Blind Auditions on March 3, 2014. All four coaches, namely Adam Levine, Usher, Shakira and Blake Shelton turned their chairs for her. She opted for Blake Shelton. She was ultimately eliminated during the Quarterfinals. In a last attempt to remain on the show and get the Twitter Instant Save, she performed "(You Make Me Feel Like) A Natural Woman", but fellow contestant Kat Perkins received it instead.

Performances
- Studio version of performance reached the top 10 on iTunes

Stage	Song	Original Artist	Date	Order	Result
Blind Audition	"Ain't No Way"	Aretha Franklin	March 3, 2014	3.20	All four chairs turned Joined Team Blake
Battles, Round 1	"Do What U Want" (vs. Paula DeAnda)	Lady Gaga	March 17, 2014	8.5	Saved by Coach
Battles, Round 2	"It's a Man's Man's Man's World" (vs. Biff Gore)	James Brown	April 1, 2014	15.1	Saved by Coach
The Playoffs	"New York State of Mind"	Billy Joel	April 8, 2014	17.5	Saved by Coach
Live Top 12	"Don't Let the Sun Go Down on Me"	Elton John	April 21, 2014	20.7	Saved by Public Vote
Live Top 10	"Oh Sherrie"	Steve Perry	April 28, 2014	22.10	Saved by Public Vote
Live Top 8	"River Deep, Mountain High"	Ike & Tina Turner	May 5, 2014	24.1	Bottom four
Live Top 8	"(You Make Me Feel Like) A Natural Woman"	Aretha Franklin	May 6, 2014	25.1	Eliminated

== Discography ==
=== Singles ===
- 2021: "Let's Go Out" (as Sisaundra) [Afrotainers Music]

=== Album ===
- 2006: Shout (as Sisaundra) [Global Records]

=== EPs ===
- 2013: Sisaundra Lewis Live EP [Grove 2 Glam Media]

=== Singles ===
- 2005: "Shout" (as Sisaundra) [Global Records / C.E.D Entertainment]
- 2016: "#Winner"

Featured in

- 2005: "Emotional" (Najee featuring Sisaundra) (also co-writing credits)

== See also ==
- List of number-one dance hits (United States)
- List of artists who reached number one on the US Dance chart
