= Dawn and Hawkes =

US musical group

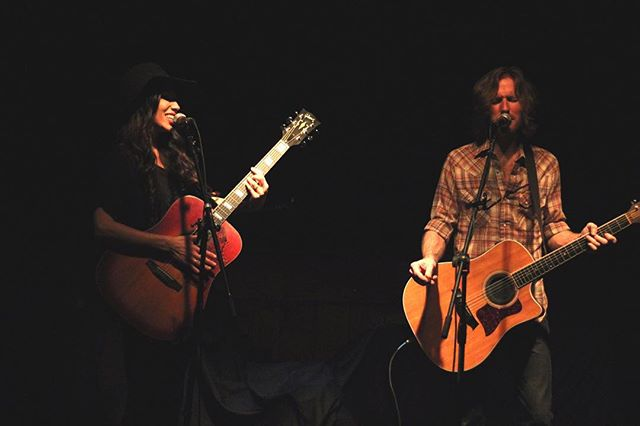
- Miranda Dawn and Chris Hawkes (2015)

Background information
- Origin: Austin, Texas, United States
- Genres: indie folk, Americana, folk
- Years active: 2012–present
- Labels: Self-released, Republic
- Members: Miranda Dawn; Chris Hawkes
- Website: www.dawnandhawkes.com

Dawn and Hawkes are an indie folk duo from Austin, Texas consisting of singer-songwriters Miranda Dawn and Chris Hawkes.

== History ==
In mid-2011 Miranda Dawn and Chris Hawkes collaborated for the recording of Dawn's debut album, Reason to Feel Alive. Dawn was recognized as a finalist in the Kerrville Folk Festival New Folk songwriting competition for her songs "Forever Happily" and "Made to Roam" and performed with Hawkes at the festival in May 2012.

Dawn and Hawkes continued co-writing and touring together and released a collaborative effort, Golden Heart, in June 2012.

While on tour in California in 2013, the duo auditioned for season 6 of the American reality talent show The Voice. Their audition was broadcast on NBC on February 24, 2014, on the inaugural episode of season 6 singing an acoustic version of The Beatles song "I've Just Seen a Face". Adam Levine and Shakira pressed the "I Want You" button turning their chairs. "That was my favorite performance I have ever seen—ever—on 'The Voice'" said Levine. After a brief consultation, they picked to be on Team Adam.

Their iTunes single for "I've Just Seen A Face" charted #1 in iTunes Rock sales and #22 across all genres selling 24,000 copies in the first week as a Billboard charts "Hot Shot Debut."I Their previously released "Golden Heart" EP followed, climbing to #2 in the singer/songwriter chart and Billboard Magazine's top 25 folk chart.

Dawn and Hawkes toured throughout 2014 including Levitt Pavilion in Arlington, Texas, California tour and appearance on The Voice Season 7 supporting their friend Luke Wade's audition, summer tour with Austin, TX singer/songwriter Bob Schneider, performances at Bass Performance Hall in Fort Worth, Texas, Austin City Limits soundstage at Moody Theater, Austin City Limits Music Festival, and performances with Chris Isaak, Patty Griffin, Jim Lauderdale, Robert Earl Keen, Hayes Carll and former host of The Tonight Show, Jay Leno. The duo continued touring throughout 2015 with appearances at music festivals like Folk Alliance International and South by Southwest while recording their first full-length album Yours and Mine.

Dawn and Hawkes announced their marriage with the release of their new music video and single, "Yours and Mine"up on August 21, 2015 via Huffington Post. Their full-length album, also titled Yours and Mine, went on sale October 2 and followed with a second video release "Almost Mine" from Texas Monthly, and third video for "Silver Line" from Acoustic Guitar magazine who featured them in "guitar duos on the rise" from the February 2016 issue and the Acoustic Guitar Sessions video series. Yours and Mine debuted in the top 10 folk albums chart at #7 and hit #3 on Roots Music radio report.

Miranda Dawn and Chris Hawkes recorded music and vocals for Daytime Emmy Award winning 2016 StoryBots series Ask The Story Bots and StoryBots Super Songs

Dawn and Hawkes appeared, individually and together, in the 2017 documentary film Albert E. Brumley: Songwriter of the Ozarks documenting the posthumous completion of several unfinished songs by Albert E. Brumley, songwriter of I'll Fly Away.

The duo stored their possessions and lived on the road full-time while starting their second full-length album The Other Side, released July 6, 2018. The album takes on weighty subject matter; from opposing sides of an argument, to the mortal loss of friends and loved ones. The first video from the album, 'Trees' premiered on Billboard. The Austin American-Statesman called The Other Side “10 new tracks of sweet folk-rock — instantly appealing tunes — rooted in the singer songwriter heyday of the early 1970’s, they also fit well into the modern-day indie-folk revival.”

The Other Side charted in the top ten folk albums and top 100 on Americana Music Association's radio chart.

The newest album from Dawn and Hawkes, Light Inside, was primarily recorded live – in one day – at Arlyn Studios, in Austin, TX. The album was engineered by Grammy winning producer/engineer Jacob Sciba and mixed by Chris Hawkes

rBeatz Radio described the sound Dawn and Hawkes captured “Light Inside brings the warmth, love, and harmony of late summer but also a tinge of sadness along with it. The understated but still undeniably resonant dynamic between the two voices — between the two creative talents at the heart of this project — adds a special frisson to the work.”

== Discography ==
=== Albums ===
Released	Album title	Album/ EP	Artist	Chart/Awards
2011	Reason to Feel Alive	Album	Miranda Dawn	"Forever Happily" and "Made to Roam" Kerrville Folk Festival New Folk Finalist
2012	Golden Heart	EP	Dawn and Hawkes	#25 Billboard Folk, #31 Top Heatseekers
2015	Yours and Mine	Album	Dawn and Hawkes	#5 Roots Music Report Folk Album Chart
2018	The Other Side	Album	Dawn and Hawkes	#8 Roots Music Report Folk and Contemporary Folk Album Chart
2024	Light Inside	Album	Dawn and Hawkes	

=== Singles ===
Released	Song Title	Label	Artist	Chart
2014	"I've Just Seen a Face"	Republic Records	Dawn and Hawkes	#13 Rock Digital Singles #22 Bubbling Under Hot 100 Singles
2014	"Stuck in the Middle with You"	Republic Records	Dawn and Hawkes	
2021	"Jingle Bells"	Self Released	Dawn and Hawkes	
2022	"Here Comes The Future"	Self Released	Dawn and Hawkes	
2023	"Bron-Y-Aur Stomp"	Self-Released	Dawn and Hawkes	

=== Filmography ===
Year	Title	Role	Type
2014	NBC The Voice	Themselves/Musicians	TV series
2015	Longhorn Network Sessions from the Cactus Cafe	Themselves/Musician	TV series
2016	Texas Music Scene TV w/Ray Benson and Jack Ingram	Themselves/Musicians	TV series
2016	Ask The StoryBots	Musicians	TV series
2016	StoryBots Super Songs	Musicians	TV series
2017	Albert E. Brumley: Songwriter of the Ozarks	Themselves/Songwriters	Documentary Film
