= Faktion (album) =

Studio album by Faktion
- Released: March 21, 2006
- Studio: Gridlock Studios, Orlando, Florida
- Length: 46:55
- Label: Roadrunner
- Producer: Justin Thomas, Brett Hestla

Professional ratings
Review scores
Source	Rating
AllMusic	2.5/5 stars

Faktion is the only and self-titled debut studio album by American rock band Faktion. Roadrunner Records released the album on March 21, 2006.

== Track listing ==
1. "Forgive Me" – 3:12
2. "Control" – 3:38
3. "Take It All Away" – 3:12
4. "Letting You Go" – 4:34
5. "Six O'Clock" – 3:53
6. "Distance" – 4:15
7. "Maybe" – 4:56
8. "Answers" – 3:33
9. "Pilot" – 4:15
10. "Always Wanting More" – 3:10
11. "Who I Am" – 4:00
12. "Better Today" – 4:12
