= Scranton, North Dakota =

Scranton
- City
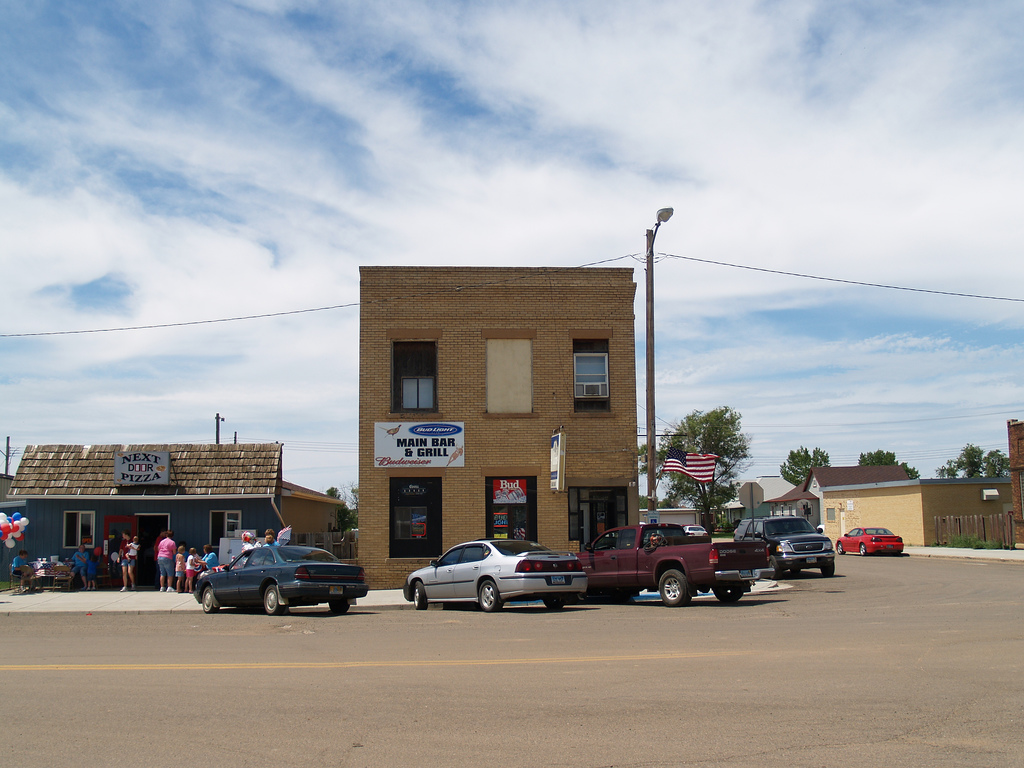
- Scranton's business district

- Location of Scranton, North Dakota
- Coordinates: 46°08′58″N 103°08′35″W
- Country: United States
- State: North Dakota
- County: Bowman
- Founded: 1907

Area
  - Total: 0.69 sq mi (1.78 km^{2})
  - Land: 0.69 sq mi (1.78 km^{2})
  - Water: 0 sq mi (0.00 km^{2})
- Elevation: 2,779 ft (847 m)

Population (2020)
  - Total: 258
  - Estimate (2022): 251
  - Density: 376.0/sq mi (145.17/km^{2})
- Time zone: UTC-7 (Mountain (MST))
  - Summer (DST): UTC-6 (MDT)
- ZIP code: 58653
- Area code: 701
- FIPS code: 38-71500
- GNIS feature ID: 1036256

Scranton is a city in Bowman County, North Dakota, United States. The population was 258 at the 2020 census.

Scranton was founded in 1907 along the Milwaukee Road rail line known as the Pacific Extension. It was named after Scranton, Pennsylvania because, like that city, it was located within a region of coal mining.

== Geography ==
According to the United States Census Bureau, the city has a total area of 0.90 square miles (2.33 km^{2}), all land.

=== Climate ===
According to the Köppen Climate Classification system, Scranton has a semi-arid climate, abbreviated "BSk" on climate maps.

== Demographics ==
Historical population
| Census | Pop. | Note | %± |
|---|---|---|---|
| 1910 | 214 | | — |
| 1920 | 353 | | 65.0% |
| 1930 | 381 | | 7.9% |
| 1940 | 277 | | −27.3% |
| 1950 | 360 | | 30.0% |
| 1960 | 358 | | −0.6% |
| 1970 | 360 | | 0.6% |
| 1980 | 415 | | 15.3% |
| 1990 | 294 | | −29.2% |
| 2000 | 304 | | 3.4% |
| 2010 | 281 | | −7.6% |
| 2020 | 258 | | −8.2% |
| 2022 (est.) | 251 | | −2.7% |
U.S. Decennial Census; 2020 Census

=== 2010 census ===
As of the census of 2010, there were 281 people, 126 households, and 83 families living in the city. The population density was 312.2 inhabitants per square mile (120.5/km^{2}). There were 147 housing units at an average density of 163.3 per square mile (63.1/km^{2}). The racial makeup of the city was 96.1% White, 3.2% Native American, and 0.7% from two or more races. Hispanic or Latino of any race were 0.7% of the population.

There were 126 households, of which 25.4% had children under the age of 18 living with them, 56.3% were married couples living together, 3.2% had a female householder with no husband present, 6.3% had a male householder with no wife present, and 34.1% were non-families. 31.7% of all households were made up of individuals, and 15.9% had someone living alone who was 65 years of age or older. The average household size was 2.23 and the average family size was 2.80.

The median age in the city was 49.4 years. 23.1% of residents were under the age of 18; 4.6% were between the ages of 18 and 24; 19.2% were from 25 to 44; 29.9% were from 45 to 64; and 23.1% were 65 years of age or older. The gender makeup of the city was 50.5% male and 49.5% female.

=== 2000 census ===
As of the census of 2000, there were 304 people, 125 households, and 86 families living in the city. The population density was 343.6 inhabitants per square mile (132.7/km^{2}). There were 139 housing units at an average density of 157.1 per square mile (60.7/km^{2}). The racial makeup of the city was 99.01% White, 0.33% Native American, 0.66% from other races. Hispanic or Latino of any race were 0.66% of the population.

There were 125 households, out of which 31.2% had children under the age of 18 living with them, 65.6% were married couples living together, 1.6% had a female householder with no husband present, and 30.4% were non-families. 28.0% of all households were made up of individuals, and 14.4% had someone living alone who was 65 years of age or older. The average household size was 2.43 and the average family size was 2.99.

In the city, the population was spread out, with 26.0% under the age of 18, 3.9% from 18 to 24, 24.0% from 25 to 44, 28.3% from 45 to 64, and 17.8% who were 65 years of age or older. The median age was 43 years. For every 100 females, there were 96.1 males. For every 100 females age 18 and over, there were 102.7 males.

The median income for a household in the city was $32,500, and the median income for a family was $41,667. Males had a median income of $27,500 versus $16,458 for females. The per capita income for the city was $16,283. About 5.1% of families and 5.8% of the population were below the poverty line, including 1.4% of those under the age of eighteen and 5.6% of those 65 or over.

== Notable people ==
- Warren Christopher, lawyer, diplomat and United States Secretary of State
- Kat Perkins, vocalist on hit TV show The Voice
