= Kristen Merlin =

American country singer (born 1984)

- Born: December 13, 1984 (age 41); Hanson, Massachusetts, United States
- Genres: Country, pop
- Occupation: Singer/songwriter
- Instruments: Vocals, guitar
- Years active: 2010–present
- Website: www.kristenmerlin.com

Kristen Marie Merlin (born December 13, 1984) is an American country singer. She is best known for finishing in the top 5 on Season 6 of NBC's signing competition The Voice in 2014 as a part of Shakira's team.

== Career ==
=== 2014: The Voice ===
At the blind auditions on February 24, 2014, Merlin performed Sugarland’s "Something More," persuading Adam Levine and Shakira to turn their chairs. Merlin chose Shakira and remained on her team the entire season.

During the season's first live episode, Merlin's microphone went dead while she was singing Sugarland's "Stay." Merlin continued to sing until she was brought another microphone about 20 seconds later, allowing the audience to hear the final note of the song. She received overwhelming enthusiasm from the audience and the coaches.

Adam Levine praised Merlin for her performance, saying, "You handled it so gracefully. It was as if nothing happened. Well done. I would have been in a puddle of my own nerves. I would have been crying. I would have had a thumb in my mouth. That was real inspiring to see you be cool – ice water in your veins."

During the semi-finals, Merlin performed Miranda Lambert's "Gunpowder & Lead," and Jewel's "Foolish Games." The latter made the top 10 on the iTunes top 100 singles chart. Merlin and Kat Perkins were eliminated, while Josh Kaufman, Jake Worthington and Christina Grimmie progressed to the finals.

Merlin toured 31 U.S. cities on "The Voice Tour" in 2014. Other performers included Season 6's Kaufman, Worthington, Grimmie and Jake Barker, Season 5's Tessanne Chin, Jacquie Lee and Will Champlin, Season 4's Holly Tucker and Season 1's Dia Frampton.

=== 2015–present: Boomerang and Humans Being ===
On January 20, 2015, Merlin independently released her first EP, Boomerang, which reached #2 on Billboard's Heatseekers Northeast chart. Boomerang was produced by Corey Britz, engineered by Paul Fig, and recorded at Southland Records in Los Angeles. The five-track EP features four songs written by Merlin, "A Little While," "Confusion," "For Now," and "Pocket Love Song." The title track, "Boomerang," was co-written by Corey and Kara Britz.

On February 8, 2019, Merlin released her second independently released EP, Humans Being, which reached No. 4 on Billboard's Heatseekers Northeast chart. The first single from the EP, "Don’t Call It a Comeback" (written by Alex Kline, Kellys Collins and Hannah Blaylock) was released on October 26, 2018. The five-track EP includes three songs co-written by Merlin, "Disengage" (written with Rob Pagnano and Lauren Weintraub), "Anyway" (written with Chris Parker), and "Humans Being" (written with Brian Dean Maher and Skip Black), as well as "Living Proof" (written by Matthew McVaney, Emily Weisband and Jennifer Schott).

== Discography ==
=== Extended plays ===
Title	Album details	Peak Billboard chart positions
Title	Album details	Heatseekers – Northeast
Humans Being	Release date: February 8, 2019; Label: Self-released; Formats: Extended play	4
Boomerang	Release date: January 20, 2015; Label: Self-released; Formats: Extended play	2
"—" denotes items which failed to chart.

=== Releases from The Voice ===
Year	Single	Peak Billboard chart positions							
Year	Single	Bubbling Under Hot 100	Hot Country Songs	Heatseekers Songs	Digital Song Sales	Digital Tracks	Country Digital Song Sales	Pop Digital Song Sales	Hot Canadian Digital Song Sales
2014	"Something More"	—	—	—	—	—	—	—	—
2014	"Turn On the Radio"	—	—	—	—	—	—	—	—
2014	"I Can Love You Better"	—	—	—	—	—	—	—	—
2014	"Two Black Cadillacs"	—	—	—	—	—	—	—	—
2014	"Stay"	—	38	—	—	—	23	—	—
2014	"Let Her Go"	—	35	—	—	—	23	—	—
2014	"I Drive Your Truck"	—	40	—	—	—	30	—	—
2014	"Gunpowder & Lead"	—	47	—	—	—	47	—	—
2014	"Foolish Games"	11	—	19	44	44	—	24	58
"—" denotes releases that did not chart

=== Music videos ===
Year	Video	Director
2018	"Don't Call It a Comeback"	Sean Hagwell
