= Broken Ones (EP) =

EP by Jacquie Lee
- Released: October 21, 2014
- Recorded: 2014
- Genre: Pop; pop rock; blues rock
- Length: 18:10
- Label: Atlantic; 300
- Producer: Dana Parish; Andrew Hollander; Eric Rosse

Jacquie Lee chronology
The Complete Season 5 Collection (The Voice Performance) (2013)	Broken Ones (2014)	The Only One (2017)

Singles from Broken Ones
- 1. "Broken Ones" Released: May 13, 2014; 2. "Tears Fall" Released: March 9, 2015

Broken Ones is the debut extended play recorded by American singer and runner-up of the fifth season of The Voice Jacquie Lee. It was released through Atlantic Records and 300 Entertainment on October 21, 2014. A cover of Cyndi Lauper's 1983 hit, "Girls Just Want to Have Fun" is included along with four original songs co-written by popular songwriters such as Sia and Andreas Carlsson. The EP failed to reach the Billboard 200, but did peak at 193 on the Top Current Albums component chart.

== Singles ==
The title track, "Broken Ones", was released to digital retailers as the lead single and Lee's debut post-Voice release on May 13, 2014. It entered the Pop Digital Songs sales chart at 36. The song was serviced to hot adult contemporary radio through 300 Entertainment on June 16, 2014.

"Tears Fall" was first released digitally on October 7, 2014, as a promotional single in support of pre-orders. It was later selected as the second official single and was scheduled to impact adult and pop radio on February 23, 2015, but its release was delayed and the song instead impacted on March 9, 2015.

== Critical reception ==
Jason Scott of PopDust rated the EP four stars out of five and praised Lee's "uncanny maturity" on the record. "Lee has balanced the trapeze between catchy, memorable material and a stellar presentation," writes Scott, "Broken Ones is where everything seems to gloriously fall into place perfectly." Emilee Lindner of MTV called the EP a must-hear which demonstrates that Lee is "equipped with powerful vocals and the smarts of an industry vet."

== Track listing ==
No.	Title	Writer(s)	Length
1.	"Broken Ones"	Dana Parish; Andrew Hollander; Andy Love	3:49
2.	"Tears Fall"	Sia Furler; Jeremy Michael Coleman	3:34
3.	"Drown Me in Your Love"	Jacquie Lee; Eric Rosse; Anna Waronker; Benedetto Rotondi	3:46
4.	"Right Love"	Parish; Hollander; Andreas Carlsson	3:59
5.	"Girls Just Want to Have Fun"	Robert Hazard	3:02
Total length:			18:10

== Chart performance ==
Chart (2014)	Peak position
US Top Current Albums (Billboard)	1
US Top Heatseekers Albums (Billboard)	1
