= Faktion =

American rock band

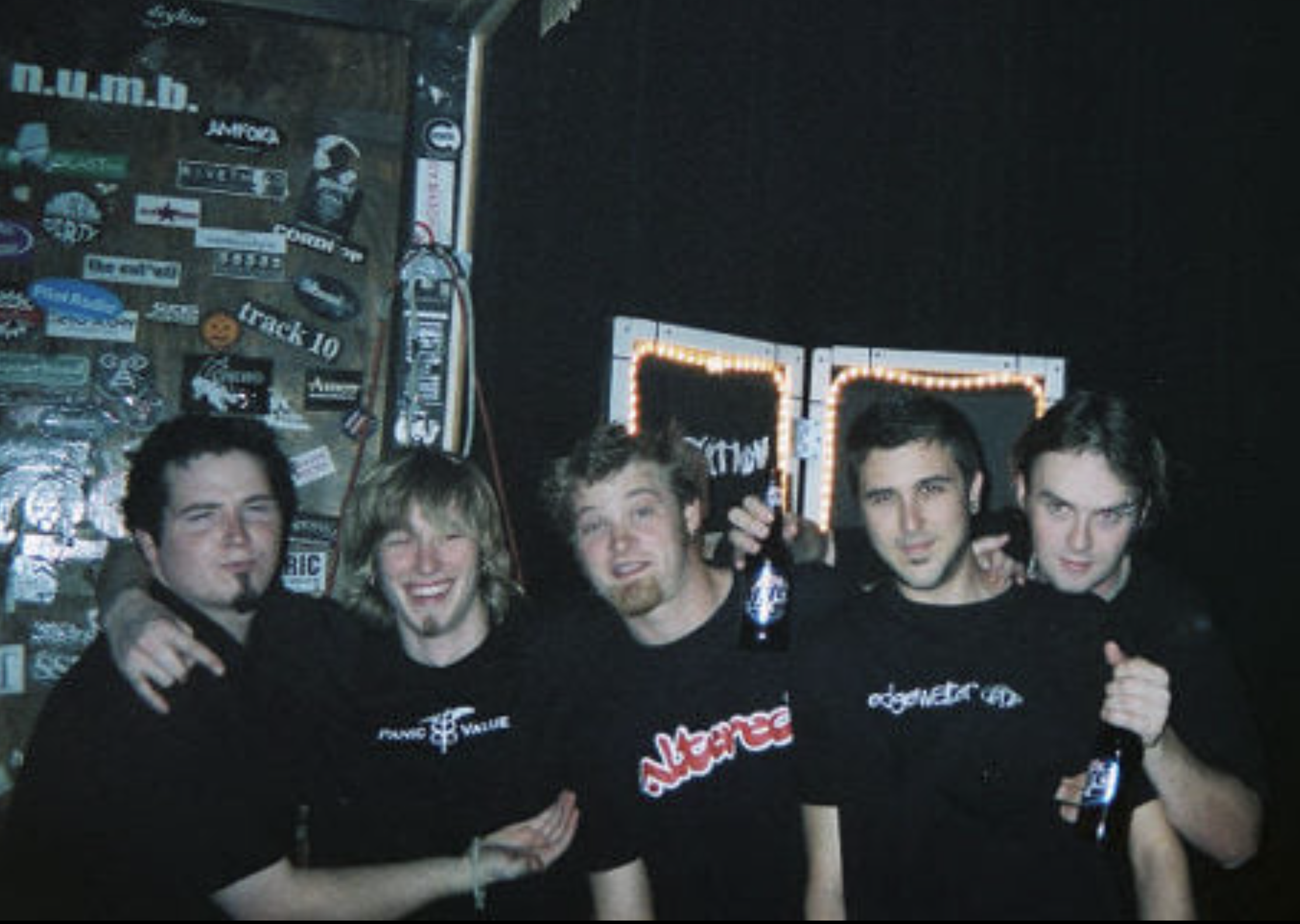
- Original Faktion lineup September 23, 2004 at the Curtain Club in Dallas, Texas

Background information
- Origin: Denton, Texas, U.S.
- Genres: alternative rock, post-grunge, mainstream rock, pop rock
- Years active: 2002–2011
- Label: Roadrunner
- Members: Josh Franklin; Marshal Dutton; Jeremy Blackstock; Ryan Gibbs
- Past members: Aaron Pose; Jeremy “Brink” Coan
- Website: faktionband.com

Faktion was an American rock band from Denton, Texas.

== History ==
Faktion formed in 2002 as a four-piece group after the band members met at the University of North Texas in Denton, Texas. Originally, guitarist Marshal Dutton was the band's vocalist, but frontman Ryan Gibbs was recruited and the band became a five-piece group.

In 2004, the band independently recorded and released an EP titled Make a Dent. In October 2004, they signed a deal with Roadrunner Records. Their self-titled debut album Faktion was produced by Brett Hestla (Dark New Day) and Justin Thomas, and was recorded at Gridlock Studios in Orlando, Florida. Shortly thereafter, the group embarked upon The Girls Gone Wild Rocks America tour with Hinder and Revelation Theory. The album was released on March 21, 2006. That following summer, after the release, the band gained a spot opening for Mercy Fall and Seether on Seether's Karma and Effect tour. Other notable tours included 10 Years and Theory of a Deadman with several other one-off dates with various national acts.

A short time after their album was released, the band announced they had parted ways with Roadrunner.

The band independently released a five-track B-side EP on March 20, 2007. On May 3, 2007, the band announced Gibbs' departure to pursue other opportunities. Gibbs went on to record a song titled "Suddenly (One More Try)" with Dallas-based rock band Kennedy, released in late 2008; later he formed the acoustic duo Right on Red with Faktion guitarist Josh Franklin.

In February 2008, the band released a new EP, Ignite What's Inside, featuring the new lineup and new material. The Tracks "Feel Your Fire" "Burn" and "Be Here Lately" were produced by Chris Hawkes and recorded at One Road Studio in Austin, Texas, with "Be Here Lately" co-written by Hawkes. "Save the World" was recorded at "Reel Time Audio" in Denton, Texas

As of 2008–2011, Faktion has disbanded, with previous members doing their own individual projects. Former member Marshal Dutton started writing, recording and producing for Hinder in 2009, eventually taking over as their lead vocalist in January 2015. Dutton has already released a new album with Hinder titled When the Smoke Clears. They re-recorded the Faktion song "Dead to Me" on the new record.

== Discography ==
=== Albums ===
- Faktion (2006)

=== EPs ===
Release date	Title	Label	US chart peak	US sales
2004	Make a Dent – EP	Self-released		
March 20, 2007	The B-Sides – EP	Self-released		
February 26, 2008	Ignite What's Inside – EP	Self-released		
2008	Crash Ashore – EP	Self-released		

=== Singles ===
Year	Song	US Hot 100	U.S. Modern Rock	U.S. Mainstream Rock	Album
2006	"Take It All Away"	-	-	29	Faktion
