= Get Her Back =

Single by Robin Thicke

from the album Paula
- Released: May 19, 2014
- Recorded: 2014
- Genre: R&B
- Length: 3:32
- Label: Star Trak; Interscope
- Songwriters: Bobby Keyes; Robin Thicke
- Producer: Robin Thicke

Robin Thicke singles chronology
"Calling All Hearts" (2014)	"Get Her Back" (2014)	"I Don't Like It, I Love It" (2015)

Audio sample
- "Get Her Back" (2014): file; help

"Get Her Back" is a song by American recording artist Robin Thicke. The song was released on May 19, 2014, via Star Trak Entertainment and Interscope Records as the only single from the album Paula. The song was written as an attempt to reconcile with his wife, actress Paula Patton, whom he had separated from in February 2014. Thicke performed and premiered the song live at the 2014 Billboard Music Awards, which generated attention before and after the awards ceremony. The single peaked at #82 on the Billboard Hot 100.

== Background and writing ==
After nine years of marriage, Thicke and his wife, American actress Paula Patton, separated in February 2014. Having been together in a relationship since they were teenagers and then marrying in 2005, Thicke made various public attempts to reconcile with his wife, including dedicating concert performances to her. In May 2014, it was announced that he would premiere a new song at the 2014 Billboard Music Awards titled "Get Her Back". Days before the awards ceremony, TMZ obtained a copy of the lyrics that seemingly addressed his separation and his desire to get back with Patton. The song was co-written by guitarist and long-time Thicke collaborator, Bobby Keyes.

The single "Get Her Back" was released on May 19, 2014, and Thicke debuted the song that day at the Billboard Music Awards. The song has been described as a "heartfelt" ballad that is dedicated to his estranged wife, Patton. Lyrically, the protagonist expresses regret and sadness over his part in a failed relationship ("I should've kissed you longer/I should've held you stronger") and how he is willing to reconcile and make amends with his lover ("All I wanna do is make it right...I gotta get her, go get her back/I gotta treat her right/I gotta cherish her for life.")

== Release ==
"Get Her Back" was released as digital download to various music digital retailers on May 19, 2014, one day after he premiered the song at the Billboard Music Awards.

== Music video ==
The music video for "Get Her Back", directed by Jonas Åkerlund, premiered on Vevo on June 23, 2014. Thicke sings directly into the camera for most of the nearly four-minute video, mainly in close shots from the neck up and bare-chested, in front of a black background and appears with a black eye and bloody nose. Interspersed throughout the video are masked and adorned women who fade in and out and flash across the screen. In a series of shots that appear intermittently and momentarily, Thicke can be seen crying, holding his hands on his head while screaming and shaking in apparent frustration, being caressed by the hands of a woman, and making what seems to be a gun with his finger and pointing it against his head.

The utilization of water reoccurs throughout the video. Thicke is shown immersing his head in water while he shakes and yells soundlessly. A bouquet of roses and a pair of heels are plunged into water in separate shots. A woman is seen through ripples of water, moving her hand across the water's surface and subsequently is seen submerged in the water, thrashing and ostensibly drowning.

The video simultaneously shows a series of text messages seemingly between Thicke and his estranged wife Paula, some of which include You drink too much, I wrote a whole album about you, I hate myself, You embarrassed me, and You're reckless. Whether the texts are taken directly from actual textual exchanges between Paula and Robin, were adapted for the music video based on sentiments expressed to Thicke by Paula, or were created for the video is unknown. When asked about the authenticity of the texts, Thicke remained ambiguous, saying: "I think you should keep a little mystery...I think it's important to make something out of it. As an artist, I have to make art. As an entertainer, I want to entertain. And as a human being, this is all I want to talk about."

Among the final shots in the video, a human heart in a woman's hand quickly flickers by and a close-up of Thicke's hand reveals him wearing his wedding ring. The final text of the video, "this is just the beginning" (extraneous to the main series of texts), hints to the viewers that there is more content to follow, and more story to be told, as this is the lead single and video from the album.

== Chart performance ==
Chart (2014)	Peak position
US Billboard Hot 100	82
US Hot R&B/Hip-Hop Songs (Billboard)	25
US Adult R&B Songs (Billboard)	5
US R&B/Hip-Hop Airplay (Billboard)	27
US Hot R&B Songs (Billboard)	13
US R&B Digital Songs (Billboard)	8
