= Cooder Graw =

American country band

Cooder Graw is a self-described "loud country" (country music / alternative country) band from Amarillo and Lubbock, Texas. It is also the title of their second album.

The group formed in 1998. It is perhaps most well known for the song "Llano Estacado" that was featured on a series of Dodge commercials.

Cooder Graw is somewhat of an anomaly in the music industry, in that its members' ages at its inception ranged from late-30s to early-50s. The band's singer, Matt Martindale, was the assistant district attorney of Gray County, Texas, before devoting his full attention to the band. Guitarist Kelly Turner was the manager of a manufacturing plant in Slaton, Texas.

The band was originally called "Coup de Grâce," but another band was already using that name, so the name was changed to a "Texas-version" of the original name. The band's debut album, Home at the Golden Light, consisted of mostly covers and was self-produced by the band (though executive producer credit is given to Matthew McConaughey, a fraternity brother of Matt Martindale). It was released in 1998. The band's first national release, Cooder Graw, was released in late 1999.

Cooder Graw has toured extensively throughout Texas and the United States, both headlining and opening for artists such as Willie Nelson and Alabama. The group also played at the premiere of the film EDtv, which starred McConaughey.

In 2006, Cooder Graw announced that they would cease performing together after the end of the year. Their last show was on December 31, 2006, in Fort Worth, Texas. Lead singer Matt Martindale is still performing occasionally with his new band, The Matt Martindale Band.

While Martindale, Turner, and Baker returned to careers outside of music, February 27, 2012, Cooder Graw announced a reunion tour would kick off April 28, 2012, at the Larry Joe Taylor Music Fest with more dates to follow.

== Current ==
- Matt Martindale - acoustic guitar, vocals
- Paul Baker - bass guitar
- Kelly Turner - lead guitar
- Kelly Test - drums, backing vocals
- Carmen Acciaioli - fiddle, mandolin
- Danny Crelin - pedal steel guitar

== Former members ==
- Joe Ammons - drums, vocals
- Jim Whisenhunt - pedal steel guitar
- Nick Worley - fiddle, mandolin
- Jon "Fish" Hunt - drums, backing vocals

== Discography ==
=== Albums ===
- Home at the Golden Light (1998)
- Cooder Graw (1999)
- Segundo (2000)
- Shifting Gears (2001)
- Live at Billy Bob's Texas (2002)
- Wake Up (2004)
- Big Sign (2009)
- Love to Live By (2016)

=== Music videos ===
- "Junior's in the Yard"
- "Better Days"
- "Love to Live By"

=== Compilations ===
- Texas Road Trip - "18 Wheels of Loving" (2001)
- Brewed in Texas - "Whiskey Bent And Hellbound" (2002)
- Cow Hear This - "Better Days" (2002)
- Compadre's Texas Lovers - "Ain't Livin' Long Like This" (2003)
- Red River Tribute (tribute to Waylon Jennings) - "Rainy Day Woman" (2003)
