= Kat Perkins =

American singer

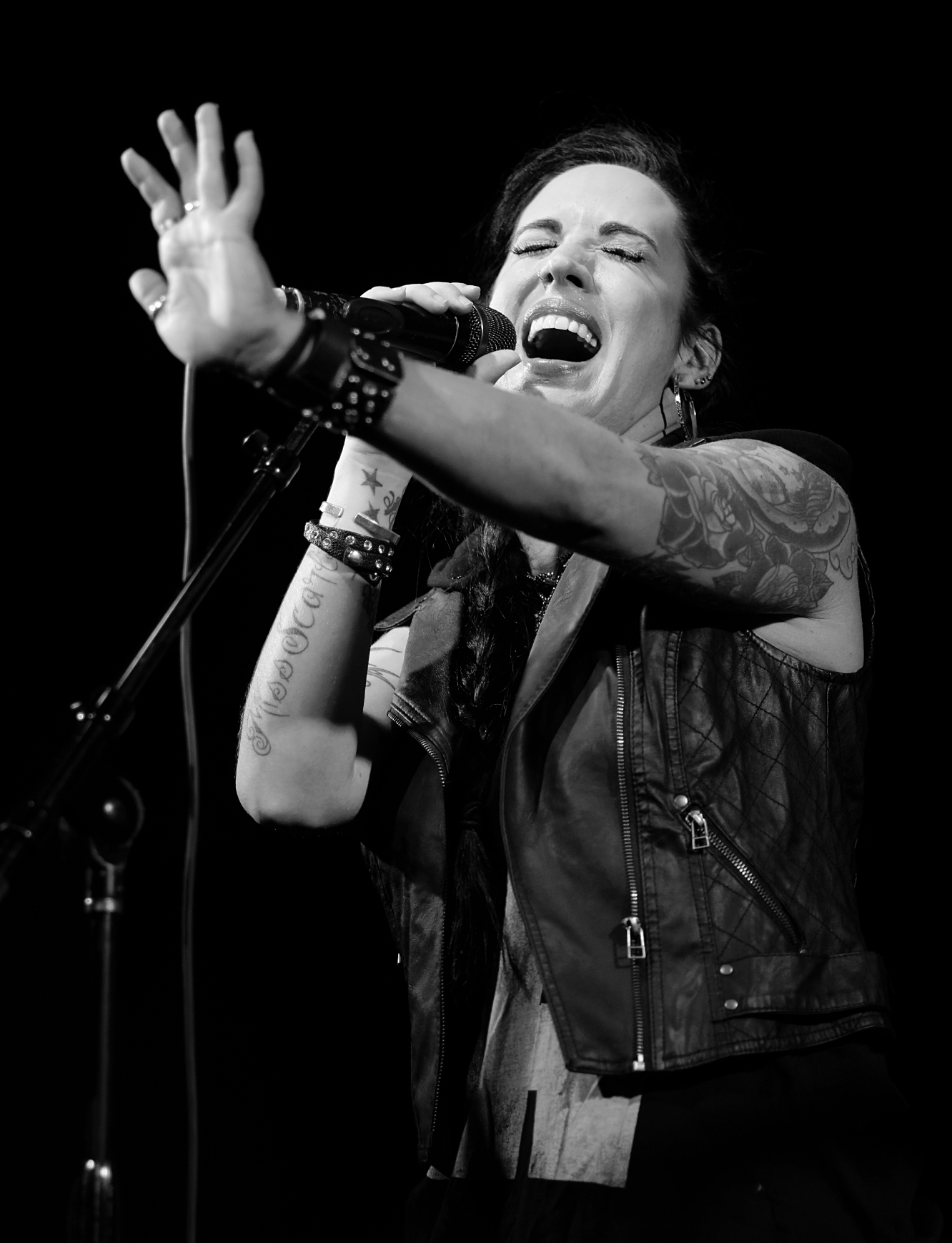
- Perkins in 2016

Background information
- Born: Scranton, North Dakota, U.S.
- Genres: Rock; pop; blues; country
- Occupation: Singer
- Website: katperkinsmusic.com

Kat Perkins is an American singer from Scranton, North Dakota. She appeared on The Voice season 6 and advanced to the television show's semi-finals. She released her first single in August 2014.

== Early life and education ==
Kat Perkins was born and raised in Scranton, North Dakota. She is the daughter of Mark Perkins, a music teacher, and Gayle Perkins, an organist. As a child, Kat Perkins sang harmonies with her sister Kelly and took piano lessons. She began performing professionally at the age of fifteen.

== Career ==
In 1999, Perkins graduated from high school and joined the Medora Musical, a musical production performed in North Dakota. She moved to Twin Cities, Minnesota to attend cosmetology school, where she began working in Hey City Theater Productions.

Perkins fronted Scarlet Haze, a band from Twin Cities, Minnesota. In 2005, the band opened for Bon Jovi at the Target Center in Minneapolis. Perkins had surgery on her vocal cords, which resulted in a three-year hiatus from her singing career. She began working as a full-time nanny for a family with five children in Twin Cities During her off time, Perkins traveled to the Middle East with other musicians to entertain American military troops in 2013.

Perkins was chosen to audition for The Voice season 6 in Los Angeles, California, after producers saw a video of her singing Adele's "Someone Like You" on YouTube. In October 2013, Perkins was selected for The Voice's blind auditions. Perkins performed "Gold Dust Woman" at the television show's blind audition, and received interest from three judges. She chose Adam Levine as her coach, who led her to the semi-finals. Perkins was saved from elimination twice by audience votes via Twitter, before being eliminated from The Voice in May 2014. Perkins was part of the most tweeted-about moment in history of a television show.

In August 2014, Perkins released her first single, "Fearless". The week following the single's release, "Fearless" placed in the top five on iTunes rock chart. "Fearless" also qualified for the first round of the Grammy Awards "Best Rock Song and Best Rock Performance" competition. Her experience on The Voice inspired Perkins to write the song. In September 2014, Perkins and EduTech partnered with the "Positive Social Media Tour" to visit schools across the United States to discuss social media with students and give a live performance. Perkins began touring her single and songs from The Voice in October 2014. That month, she sang the national anthem at a Minnesota Vikings football game. Since 2022, she is a backing vocalist for Kid Rock's Twisted Brown Trucker Band.

== The Voice (2014) ==
Round	Date	Song	Original Artist	Order	Result
Blind Auditions	March 10	"Gold Dust Woman"	Fleetwood Mac	—N/a	Adam Levine, Shakira, and Usher turned, she choose Adam
The Battles; Round 1	March 17	"Whenever I Call You 'Friend'" (vs. Patrick Thomson)	Kenny Loggins feat. Stevie Nicks	—N/a	Saved by Coach
The Battles; Round 2	April 7	"Suddenly I See" (vs. Dawn & Hawkes)	KT Tunstall	—N/a	Saved by Coach
Playoff Round	April 14	"Open Arms"	Journey	2.8	Adam's choice
Top 12	April 21	"Magic Man"	Heart	9	Public's Vote
Top 10	April 28	"Landslide"	Fleetwood Mac	1	Instant Save
Top 8	May 5	"Get Lucky"	Daft Punk	3	Instant Save
Top 5	May 12	"Chandelier"	Sia	3	Eliminated
Top 5	May 12	"Let It Go"	Frozen	7	Eliminated

== Discography ==
=== Studio albums ===
Title	Album details
Kat Perkins	Released: July 10, 2015; Label: Kat Perkins Music; Format: Digital download

=== Extended plays ===
Title	Album details
Fearless	Released: September 26, 2014; Label: Kat Perkins; Format: Digital download
A Kat Perkins Christmas	Released: November 16, 2015; Label: Kat Perkins Music; Format: Digital download
A Kat Perkins Christmas, Vol. II	Released: November 24, 2016; Label: Kat Perkins Music; Format: Digital download

=== Singles ===
List of singles, with release year and affiliated album
Year	Title	Album
2014	"Fearless"	Fearless
2015	"Drive"	Kat Perkins
2016	"Angels"	Non-album single

==== As featured artist ====
List of featured singles, with release year and affiliated album
Year	Title	Other artist	Album
2013	"The One That Got (Pushed) Away"	You Jump, I Jump	Reckless (Note: "The One That Got (Pushed) Away" was originally recorded by You Jump, I Jump featuring Perkins' band Scarlet Haze for the former's album, Reckless, but was credited to Perkins as a solo featured artist on the song's single release.)

==== Promotional singles ====
List of singles, with release year and affiliated album
Year	Title	Album
2014	"Barracuda"	Fearless
2014	"Paris (Ooh La La)"	Fearless
2014	"Have Yourself a Merry Little Christmas"	A Kat Perkins Christmas

=== Other charted songs ===
Year	Single	Peak chart positions		Album
Year	Single	US Pop Digital	US Rock	Album
2014	"Landslide"	—	35	Non-album single
2014	"Get Lucky"	27	—	Non-album single
2014	"Let It Go"	45	—	Non-album single
