= Broken Ones =

Single by Jacquie Lee

from the album Broken Ones
- Released: May 13, 2014
- Genre: Pop
- Length: 3:50
- Label: Atlantic
- Songwriter(s): Dana Parish; Andrew Hollander; Andy Love
- Producer(s): Dana Parish; Andrew Hollander

Jacquie Lee singles chronology
"Broken Ones" (2014)	"Tears Fall" (2015)

"Broken Ones" is a pop song written by Dana Parish, Andrew Hollander and Andy Love, and performed by American recording artist Jacquie Lee. It was released on May 13, 2014 as her debut single after placing second on The Voice, and the lead single of her EP, also titled Broken Ones (2014). "Broken Ones" impacted American hot adult contemporary radio in June 2014.

== Background ==
Lee describes the song by saying "part of the human experience is the imperfection that goes with it." Also she states "everyone of us is broken in some way, shape or form. Even if you don't want to admit it, you have to be real with yourself. If you don't admit it, maybe you internalize it, maybe I am a little bit broken."

== Critical reception ==
Lyndsey Parker of Rolling Stone gave the song a favorable review, saying "Broken Ones is a mature-beyond-Jacquie's-years piano power ballad, very Sarah McLachlan/Christina Perri in feel, with tastefully spare production that places the prodigy's voice (of course) front and center." Similarly, Chris Jordan of Asbury Park Press (part of the USA Today Network) gave Lee a positive review, saying "powerful but not overblown and serene but not sappy, "Broken Ones" frames Lee's voice around a strong melody, a sweeping chorus and uplifting, yet vulnerable, lyrics." Lucas Villa of AXS TV also cited stylistic similarities to Christina Perri and wrote that "Lee's vocals soar to new heights" and proves that "there is still life beyond [The Voice]" for Lee.

== Track listing ==
Remixes single
No.	Title	Length
1.	"Broken Ones" (D.veloped remix)	3:33
2.	"Broken Ones" (Martin Volt & Quentin State remix)	5:03
3.	"Broken Ones" (Feenixpawl remix)	5:48
Total length:		14:24

== Music video ==
An accompanying music video was directed by Max Nichols and follows a group of "down-on-their-luck teenage girls" as they discover their creative identities in an abandoned building. The video premiered October 24, 2014.

== Chart performance ==
Chart (2014)	Peak position
US Pop Digital Songs (Billboard)	36

== Release history ==
Country	Date	Format	Label	Ref.
Various	May 13, 2014	Digital download	300; Atlantic	
United States	June 16, 2014	Hot / Mod / AC radio	300	
Various	December 9, 2014	Digital download – remixes	Atlantic; Warner	
