= Josh Kaufman (singer) =

American singer (born 1976)

- Born: Joshua Kaufman; November 9, 1976 (age 49); Sarasota, Florida, U.S.
- Origin: Indianapolis, Indiana
- Genres: Pop; R&B; pop rock; soul
- Occupations: Singer; songwriter; pianist
- Instruments: Vocals; piano; guitar
- Years active: 2010–present
- Labels: Republic

Josh Kaufman (born November 9, 1976) is an American soul singer and songwriter. A native of the Tampa Bay area in Florida, Kaufman is based in Indianapolis, Indiana. He is best known for winning the season 6 of NBC's The Voice as a member of Usher's team and previously Adam Levine's team.

== Early life ==
Kaufman was born in Sarasota, Florida, the son of Beth Gilbert, the minister of music at Slusser's Chapel in Blacksburg, Virginia; and Mark Kaufman, who owns a roofing company. His stepfather, Rev. Richard Gilbert, is the pastor of a church in Blacksburg. While in Blacksburg, he was a member of the Blacksburg High School Madrigals, an elite choir. He grew up in Lake Wales, Florida and until his first year of high school went to school in the city. He and his mother moved to Blacksburg. He graduated from Blacksburg High School and musical talent was evident early in his life. At sixteen, he appeared on Star Search and in 2011, Kaufman auditioned for the first season of Simon Cowell's The X Factor. Josh Kaufman moved to Anderson, Indiana to attend Anderson University and graduated from IUPUI in Indianapolis.

Kaufman is a member of the band The New Etiquette (formerly known as Josh Kaufman and the Frequency), a rock and soul band from Indianapolis. The band was formed in 2010 with original band members Kaufman, Ryan Koch, and Nate Gray. The band released a self-titled EP with six tracks in spring 2012, drawing on the musical talents of several local musicians. From 2011 to 2014 Kaufman performed regularly at Potbelly Sandwich Shop in Indianapolis and also worked as a SAT prep tutor.

== Career ==
=== The Voice (2014) ===
On the fifth episode of the Blind Auditions broadcast on March 10, 2014, he performed George Michael's song "One More Try." All four judges turned their chairs and Kaufman chose to join Team Adam. Kaufman defeated fellow Team Adam member Austin Ellis in the Battles, Round 1. Kaufman lost his second battle round competition against Delvin Choice but was immediately stolen by Team Usher. Kaufman received the first iTunes bonus multiplier of the season, with his studio recording of "Stay With Me" reaching the fifth position on the iTunes Top 200 Singles chart at the close of the voting window.

On May 20, 2014, Kaufman was announced as the winner of Season 6 of The Voice.

– Studio version of performance reached the top 10 on iTunes

Stage	Song	Original Artist	Date	Order	Result
Blind Audition	"One More Try"	George Michael	March 10, 2014	5.18	All four chairs turned Joined Team Adam
Battles, Round 1	"Happy" (vs. Austin Ellis)	Pharrell Williams	March 24, 2014	11.1	Saved by Adam
Battles, Round 2	"Signed, Sealed, Delivered, I'm Yours" (vs. Delvin Choice)	Stevie Wonder	March 31, 2014	14.6	Defeated; Stolen by Usher
The Playoffs	"It Will Rain"	Bruno Mars	April 15, 2014	19.5	Saved by Usher
Live Top 12	"Stay with Me"	Sam Smith	April 21, 2014	20.12	Saved by Public Vote
Live Top 10	"This is It"	Kenny Loggins	April 28, 2014	22.4	Saved by Public Vote
Live Top 8	"I Can't Make You Love Me"	Bonnie Raitt	May 5, 2014	24.2	Saved by Public Vote
Live Top 5 (Semi-finals)	"All of Me"	John Legend	May 12, 2014	26.2	Saved by Public Vote
Live Top 5 (Semi-finals)	"Love Runs Out"	OneRepublic	May 12, 2014	26.6	Saved by Public Vote
Live Finale (Final 3)	"Every Breath You Take" (with Usher)	The Police	May 19, 2014	28.2	Winner
Live Finale (Final 3)	"Signed, Sealed, Delivered, I'm Yours"	Stevie Wonder	May 19, 2014	28.4	Winner
Live Finale (Final 3)	"Set Fire to the Rain"	Adele	May 19, 2014	28.9	Winner

=== Later career ===
Kaufman participated in the Indy Jazz Fest in September 2014. He appeared at the Indiana State Fair in Indianapoiis in August 2014. He was the final actor to play the title role in the 2013 Broadway revival of Pippin, which closed in early 2015. On June 8, 2017, he performed the national anthem in the United States vs. Trinidad And Tobago FIFA World Cup CONCACAF eliminatory match in Dick's Sporting Goods Park in Commerce City, Colorado.

== Broadway ==
Kaufman sang on Broadway in the show "Home For the Holidays, Live on Broadway" which was presented November 17 to December 30, 2017, at the August Wilson Theatre. Other vocal performers included Candice Glover, Bianca Ryan, Peter Hollens, and Evynne Hollens.

== Personal life ==
Kaufman is married to Jennifer Myer and as of November 2016 they have five children. The family live in Carmel, Indiana (a suburb of Indianapolis) where Kaufman sings with The New Etiquette.

== Discography ==
=== Albums ===
- The New Etiquette (2012)
1. Do You Want Love
2. On Me
3. That Train
4. Falling Again
5. Waving Goodbye
6. Out the Door
- Josh Kaufman (2016)
1. Truth Be Told
2. All I Ask
3. Avalanche
4. Paycheck
5. The World
6. Digging Deep

=== Singles ===
The New Etiquette (2012)

1. "Do You Want Love (Radio Only)"

=== Releases from The Voice ===
==== Albums ====
Album	Details	Peak chart positions	
Album	Details	US	US Digital
The Complete Season 6 Collection (The Voice Performance)	Release date: May 20, 2014; Label: Republic Records; Formats: CD, music download	92	14

==== Singles ====
Single	Peak chart positions			Original artist
Single	US	US Heat	US Digital	Original artist
"One More Try"	—	—	—	George Michael
"Happy"	—	—	—	Pharrell Williams
"Signed, Sealed, Delivered, I'm Yours"	—	—	19	Stevie Wonder
"It Will Rain"	—	—	—	Bruno Mars
"Stay with Me"	92	9	5	Sam Smith
"This Is It"	—	—	38	Kenny Loggins
"I Can't Make You Love Me"	71	4	2	Bonnie Raitt
"All of Me"	—	13	4	John Legend
"Love Runs Out"	—	—	13	OneRepublic
"Every Breath You Take"	—	—	12	The Police
"Set Fire to the Rain"	—	19	28	Adele
"—" denotes releases that did not chart

Awards and achievements
Preceded by Tessanne Chin	The Voice (American); Winner; 2014 (Spring)	Succeeded by Craig Wayne Boyd
Preceded by "Tumbling Down"	The Voice (American); Winner's song "Set Fire to the Rain"; 2014 (Spring)	Succeeded by My Baby's Got a Smile on Her Face
