= Count On My Love =

Studio album by Tessanne Chin
- Released: July 1, 2014
- Recorded: 2014
- Studio: Circle House Studios (Miami); Ranch Entertainment (New York City); KMA Studio (New York City); Penthouse Recording Studios (Atlanta)
- Genre: Dance-pop; reggae; R&B
- Length: 36:59
- Label: Republic; Universal Republic
- Producer: Jerry "Wonda" Duplessis; Willy Chin; Stargate; Shama "Sak Pase" Joseph; Chuck Harmony; Mark "Exit" Goodchild; MadMen Productions; Mitchum "Khan" Chin; The Supa Dups; Johann Seaton; Terry "Maddscientist" Thomas (Maadroid Inc); Jevon "BabyBoy" Hill; Ricardo Rameshwar; Shaun Pizzonia aka Sting International; Toby Gad; Peter Stengaard

Tessanne Chin chronology
| In Between Words (2010) | Count On My Love (2014) |

Singles from Count On My Love
- 1. "Tumbling Down" Released: December 18, 2013; 2. "Everything Reminds Me of You" Released: May 13, 2014

Count On My Love is the second studio album and major-label debut by Tessanne Chin, released on July 1, 2014 under Republic Records/Universal Republic. Her first official single, "Tumbling Down", was penned by Ryan Tedder of OneRepublic and his songwriting partner Noel Zancanella, and debuted immediately after her victory on The Voice. Her second and lead single, "Everything Reminds Me of You", was released on May 15, 2014.

The album debuted at forty-one on the Billboard 200 charts and at twenty on the Top Digital Albums charts. The album sold 7,000 copies in its first week according to Billboard.com, making it the lowest first week sales of a The Voice winner. Republic Records and The Voice were criticized for their failure to promote the album adequately.

== Background and development ==
In December 2013, Chin won Season 5 of The Voice. Her prizes included $100,000 (USD), an original song written by OneRepublic's Ryan Tedder, and a record deal with Universal Music Group/Republic Records to kickstart her career. She stated she would take her time and wouldn't rush the project's composition for her fans, who highly anticipated the album. Chin has commonly described the album as having a wide arrange of styles but maintaining an "island swag" to reflect her personality. The album was set to be released on June 24, 2014 as announced by Chin on Season 6 semifinal round of The Voice. However, Chin revealed that the album was pushed back to July 1, 2014 by Republic Records but did not disclose the reason for the selected date.

During the conception of the album, Tessanne collaborated with Damian Marley as well as longtime mentor Shaggy, but the tracks did not make the album. The possibility of a collaboration with Ne-Yo was also mentioned; however, this ultimately did not come into fruition. She expressed a desire to do some of the album's recording in Jamaica at Portland's GeeJam recording studio, but ultimately recorded the album throughout various studios within the United States. Producers for the album were Jerry "Wonda" Duplessis, Stargate, Shama "Sak Pase" Joseph, Mark "Exit" Goodchild, Shaun Pizzonia aka Sting International, MadMen Productions, Mitchum "Khan" Chin, and Supa Dups. Songwriters were Autumn Rowe, Rock City aka Planet VI, Claude Kelly, AC Burrell, Ryan Tedder of OneRepublic, Lil Eddie, and Diane Warren. Toby Gad, Chuck Harmony, and Johnny Black also contributed to the album. Her second single, titled "Everything Reminds Me of You," written by Rock City aka Planet VI, was debuted in a live performance during the Season 6 semifinal round of The Voice.

Tessanne co-wrote five songs, including "Everything Reminds Me of You", "Count On My Love", "Always Tomorrow", "Lifeline", and "Heaven Knows". She wrote "One Step Closer". She stated in an interview with Direct Lyrics that she's a writer as much as she's a singer, and thanked Rock City, Claude Kelly, and Toby Gad for taking that into account.

== Critical reception ==
Professional ratings
Review scores
| Source | Rating |
|---|---|
| Embrace You Magazine | 5/5 stars |
| Allmusic | 3.5/5 stars |

Andy Kellman of AllMusic wrote that Count On My Love is "concise and polished", and that it "plays to Chin's strength as a vocalist who can easily adapt to a number of stylistic backdrops — with touches of dance-pop, R&B, and, of course, a significant amount of contemporary reggae but it's ultimately mature pop." He also noted, "whether it's a belting anthem or an intimate ballad, each song is conveyed with a high level of conviction. The only surprise is the lack of guest vocalists, considering Chin's past connections and collaborative work."

Lyndsey Parker of Yahoo Music was critical about the promotion of the album: "Unless you follow her on Twitter, you probably had no idea that she released her post-Voice album, Count On My Love, today (yes, TODAY), July 1." She also elaborated, "Apparently Tessanne wants record-buyers to count on her love, but she can't totally count on Republic Records to adequately promote her album, which is now available on iTunes and as a physical CD at Wal-Mart. She's had to do most of the promotional heavy lifting herself via social media, with no radio play, music video, or TV appearances. Not only does this bode badly for her future record sales, but for the sales of Season 6 champ Josh Kaufman when he eventually releases his own album." In closing Parker added, "With its lack of promotion and adult-contemporary, quiet-storm vibe, it's unlikely to storm the charts, but if you're a fan of excellent singing, you can still definitely count on Tessanne Chin."

== Promotion ==
Following her crowning on The Voice, Chin performed the debut single and first track of the album Tumbling Down on The Jay Leno Show. The following day, during her extensive post victory media run, she performed the song on a variety of stages, including Live! with Kelly and Michael, Entertainment Weekly, and Access Hollywood. On December 30, 2013, she performed the song on KTLA. Joined by runners-up Jacquie Lee and Will Champlin, she performed the song at the annual Rose Parade on January 1, 2014 atop the first ever The Voice float. On January 4, 2014, she performed a reggae-flavored remix of the song during her set at reggae/dancehall star Shaggy's benefit concert "Shaggy and Friends." On January 25, 2014, she performed the song at Lure Nightclub in Hollywood for an audience of label and publishing executives as well as media. On May 13, 2014 Tessanne released the second single from the album, "Everything Reminds Me of You", which is considered the lead single. The song was debuted during the Season 6 semifinal round of The Voice with a live performance. Chin is also promoting "Everything Reminds Me of You" during The Voice Summer Tour as she tours 31 cities.

Tessanne made an appearance on MY Fox NY on 7 July 2014 where she performed the song "Heaven Knows." She also performed "Heaven Knows" on WGN Morning News in Chicago on 16 July 2014. On July 29, 2014, as part of the album promotion activities, Tessanne performed "Heaven Knows" on Good Day L.A. She also made an appearance on KATU Morning News in Portland on August 1, 2014, performing "Everything Reminds Me of You" and "Heaven Knows".

== Track listing ==
Standard listing
| No. | Title | Writer(s) | Producer(s) | Length |
|---|---|---|---|---|
| 1. | "Tumbling Down" | Ryan Tedder, Noel Zancanella, MoZella, Lil' Eddie | Peter Svensson | 3:34 |
| 2. | "Everything Reminds Me of You" | Tessanne Chin, Timothy Thomas, Theron Thomas | Supa Dups, Mitchum "Khan" Chin, Willy Chin, Philip Meckseper | 3:51 |
| 3. | "Count On My Love" | T. Chin, Lil Eddie, Toby Gad, Jef Martens | Shaun Pizzonia aka Sting International | 3:06 |
| 4. | "Always Tomorrow" | T. Chin, Claude Kelly, Kyle Owens, Charles Harmon, Angelica Lea | Chuck Harmony, Mark "Exit" Goodchild | 3:24 |
| 5. | "Lifeline" | T. Chin, Kelly, Johnny Black, Angelica Lea, Akil King, John Lardieri | Harmony | 4:28 |
| 6. | "I Heart U" | Diane Warren | Peter Stengaard | 3:22 |
| 7. | "Loudest Silence" | Timothy Thomas, Theron Thomas | Terry "Maddscientist" Thomas and Jevon "BabyBoy" Hill | 4:07 |
| 8. | "Heaven Knows" | T. Chin, Kelly, Black, Lea | Harmony | 4:11 |
| 9. | "People Change" | Lil Eddie, Toby Gad | Toby Gad | 3:18 |
| 10. | "One Step Closer" | T. Chin | Johann Seaton, Ricardo Rameshwar | 3:34 |

== Release history ==
| Region | Date | Label | Format |
|---|---|---|---|
| Australia | June 29, 2014 | Republic Records | Digital |
| Brazil | June 29, 2014 | Republic Records | Digital |
| United Kingdom | June 29, 2014 | Republic Records | Digital |
| United States | July 1, 2014 | Republic Records | Digital |

== Commercial performance ==
The album debuted at number 41 on the Billboard 200 with 7,000 copies sold within its first week of release.

| Chart (2014) | Peak position |
|---|---|
| US Billboard 200 | 41 |

== Personnel ==
- Mitchum Chin – keyboard
- Tessanne Chin - lead vocals, background vocals
- Colin Leonard - mastering
- Maureen McDonald - composer
- Philip Meckseper - composer
- Dwayne "Supa Dups" Chin Quee - producer
