= Tessanne Chin =

Jamaican recording artist (born 1985)

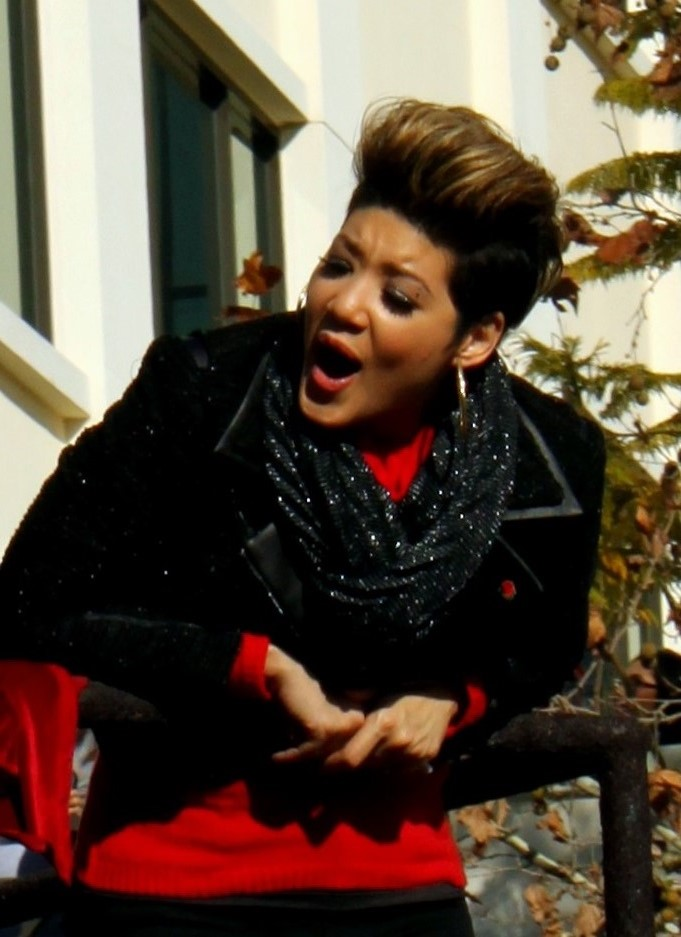
- Tessanne Chin at 2014 Rose Parade

Background information
- Born: Tessanne Amanda Chin; September 20, 1985 (age 40); Kingston, Jamaica
- Genres: Pop; R&B; reggae; soul
- Occupations: Singer; songwriter
- Instruments: Vocals; acoustic guitar
- Years active: 2006 – present
- Labels: Republic Records, Universal Music Group, Justice League Music Group
- Website: tessannechinofficial.com

Tessanne Amanda Chin (/ˈtɛsˈæn tʃɪn/; born September 20, 1985) is a Jamaican recording artist, best known for winning Season 5 of NBC's reality TV singing competition The Voice as part of Adam Levine's team. She has opened for artists such as Patti LaBelle, Peabo Bryson and Gladys Knight, and toured for three years with Jimmy Cliff. She is the younger sister of singer Tami Chynn.

Her major label debut album, Count On My Love, was released on July 1, 2014, under Republic Records.

== Early life ==
Chin was born in Kingston, Jamaica, and attended Mavisville Preparatory school. Her father, Richard Chin, is of Jamaican Chinese descent and her mother, Christine Chin, also a Jamaican national, is of English and African descent. Her parents were in a band called The Carnations and her older sister Tami Chynn is also a singer. Her cousin Jay Hall is a vocalist and guitarist with UK rockers Grassroutes (and previously The Royal Players), and Jay's brother Leon is a vocalist with ska-fusion act Electrik Custard.

Tessanne was introduced to music at a very early age by her parents. Her mother was the trumpeter and singer in The Carnations and her father was the band's drummer. The family has a recording studio in their home in Jamaica.

Tessanne started performing when she was six years old with Cathy Levy's Little People and Teen Players Club, one of Jamaica's top performing arts schools. Most of her vocal coaching came from her mother, as well as noted vocal coach Lecie Wright. Tessanne learned firsthand about cultural diversity when she moved to England at age 12. She coped with the move by devoting a lot of time to writing songs.

Tessanne married long-time boyfriend and broadcaster Michael Anthony Cuffe Jr in 2011. After four years of marriage, the couple confirmed that they were having marital problems. Chin and Cuffe divorced in 2015.

== Career ==
=== 2006–2012: Early career ===
Upon her return to Jamaica, Chin joined the Jamaican rock band Mile High and performed for crowds at many local venues including Jazzfest, Rockfest, and RETV Unplugged. Their style, "rock reggae," was unique and distinct. After going on tour for three years with Jimmy Cliff as a back-up singer, she decided to launch her solo career.

After Tessanne left Mile High, she began writing songs for her first album. Guitarist Rudy Valentino and drummer Paul "GrooveGalore" KasticK were her producers for her 2010 independent debut album In Between Words. Her 2006 debut single, "Hideaway" received heavy rotation on Caribbean radio and select stations in New York. Both the single and its music video were popular. The song was also featured on VP Records' Reggae Gold 2007. After "Hideaway," she has released two more singles, "Messenger" and "Black Books," both available online on "In Between Words".

She has performed at several live shows, including The Air Jamaica Jazz and Blues Festival 2006, Reggae Sumfest 2007 & 2012, the Deck Cafe, The Port Royal Music Festival, ABC Slim Traxx, and her very own show "Arabian Night."

Tessanne has collaborated with fellow Jamaican artists Shaggy ("Never Let Go") and Protoje ("Someone Like You"), the Trinidad and Tobago soca band Kes ("Loving You") and was featured in a track by the legendary Jamaican band Third World, titled "By My Side." She appeared as a special guest of Third World at the Highline Ballroom in New York City in April 2011. "By My Side" was featured in the soundtrack of Robert Townsend's series "Diary of a Single Mom" starring Monica Calhoun, Leon, and Billy Dee Williams.

Other noted tracks by Tessanne are remakes of songs by other famous artists and bands such as Foreigner's "I Want to Know What Love Is," The Who's "Love, Reign o'er Me," Katy Perry's "Firework," and Phish's "Free." A remake of Bob Marley's "Could You Be Loved," which Tessanne performed with her band Mile High, also circulated through the internet early in 2006. Other works include a live performance of "You and Me" written and performed with her older sister Tami Chynn.

On December 6, 2010, Tessanne released her independent debut album available for digital download entitled In Between Words.

=== The Voice (2013) ===
In Sept. 2013, it was announced that she would be competing in Season 5 of NBC's singing competition, The Voice, after reggae/dancehall star Shaggy presented her the competition as an opportunity to finally have her big break as an international star. On the second episode of the Blind Auditions broadcast on Sept. 24, 2013, she performed Pink's song "Try." All four coaches, namely Adam Levine, CeeLo Green, Christina Aguilera and Blake Shelton turned their chairs for her but she opted for Adam Levine.

On Dec. 10, 2013, her performance of Simon & Garfunkel's song "Bridge over Troubled Water" for the Semifinal Round became No. 1 on the iTunes chart, with her becoming the first contestant to achieve the top chart position at the end of an applicable voting window that season. This performance also served as her first U.S. chart appearance, charting at No. 64 on the Hot 100 chart, No. 14 on the Digital Songs chart, and No. 5 on Heatseekers Songs chart. On the Canadian Hot 100, the song made its debut at No. 39. On December 17, 2013, her performance of Whitney Houston's "I Have Nothing" became No. 1 on the iTunes chart, with her also becoming the first contestant that season to achieve the top chart position twice.

The following week the cover made its debut on the Hot 100 at No. 51, No. 12 on the Digital Songs chart and No. 15 on the Hot R&B/Hip-Hop Songs chart. Her duet with coach Adam Levine, a cover of The Beatles' "Let It Be" charted at No. 76 on the Hot 100 and No. 24 on Digital Songs. The songs also charted at No. 1 and No. 7 respectively on the Heatseekers Songs chart. In Canada, her cover of "I Have Nothing" charted at No. 32 while "Let it Be" charted at No. 35. A compilation album with studio versions of her The Voice performances was released on iTunes and charted at No. 4 on the Heatseekers Albums chart.

During the Finale Results show, she was revealed to be the winner of Season 5 obtaining the highest number of votes in Voice history. Jacquie Lee as runner-up and Will Champlin in third place. After her victory was announced, she debuted her first U.S. single "Tumbling Down," written by Ryan Tedder of OneRepublic. She is to date so far, the only foreign born contestant to win The Voice USA.

– Studio version of performance reached the top 10 on iTunes

Stage	Song	Original Artist	Date	Order	Result
Blind Audition	"Try"	Pink	Sept. 24, 2013	2.14	All four chairs turned Joined Team Adam
Battles (Top 48)	"Next to Me" (vs. Donna Allen)	Emeli Sandé	Oct. 14, 2013	7.5	Saved by Adam
Knockouts (Top 32)	"Stronger (What Doesn't Kill You)" (vs. Ashley DuBose)	Kelly Clarkson	Oct. 28, 2013	11.4	Saved by Adam
Live Playoffs (Top 20)	"Many Rivers to Cross"	Jimmy Cliff	Nov. 4, 2013	13.10	Saved by Public Vote
Live Top 12	"My Kind of Love"	Emeli Sandé	Nov. 11, 2013	16.9	Saved by Public Vote
Live Top 10	"If I Were Your Woman"	Gladys Knight & the Pips	Nov. 18, 2013	18.6	Saved by Public Vote
Live Top 8	"Underneath It All"	No Doubt feat. Lady Saw	Nov. 25, 2013	20.2	Saved by Public Vote
Live Top 6	"Redemption Song"	Bob Marley and the Wailers	Dec. 2, 2013	22.2	Saved by Public Vote
Live Top 6	"Unconditionally"	Katy Perry	Dec. 2, 2013	22.8	Saved by Public Vote
Live Top 5 (Semifinals)	"Bridge over Troubled Water"	Simon & Garfunkel	Dec. 9, 2013	24.5	Saved by Public Vote
Live Finale (Final 3)	"Try"	Pink	Dec. 16, 2013	26.1	Winner
Live Finale (Final 3)	"Let It Be" (with Adam Levine)	The Beatles	Dec. 16, 2013	26.4	Winner
Live Finale (Final 3)	"I Have Nothing"	Whitney Houston	Dec. 16, 2013	26.7	Winner

Non-competition performances
Stage	Song	Original Artist	Date	Order
Live Playoffs Results	"Safe and Sound" (with Team Adam)	Capital Cities	Nov. 7, 2013	15.4
Live Top 12 Results	"Brave" (with Sara Bareilles & the females of the Top 12)	Sara Bareilles	Nov. 12, 2013	17.1
Live Top 12 Results	"A Hard Day's Night" (with Adam Levine & Team Adam)	The Beatles	Nov. 12, 2013	17.4
Live Top 10	"Say It, Just Say It" (with the Top 10)	The Mowgli's	Nov. 18, 2013	18.1
Live Top 10 Results	"Royals" (with Caroline Pennell)	Lorde	Nov. 19, 2013	19.4
Live Top 8	"One Day" (with Cole Vosbury, Ray Boudreaux, and Will Champlin)	Matisyahu	Nov. 25, 2013	20.1
Live Top 8 Results	"Will the Circle Be Unbroken?" (with the Top 8 and the Starbucks Chorus)	No original artist. Written by Ada R. Habershon & Charles H. Gabriel	Nov. 26, 2013	21.2
Live Top 8 Results	"Apologize" / "All the Right Moves" (with the Top 8)	OneRepublic	Nov. 26, 2013	21.4
Live Top 6 Results	"You've Got the Love" (with Matthew Schuler and Jacquie Lee)	Candi Staton	Dec. 3, 2013	23.2
Live Top 6 Results	"Joy to the World" / "O Holy Night" (with the Top 6)	Traditional carols written by Isaac Watts / Adolphe Adam	Dec. 3, 2013	23.5
Live Top 5 (Semifinals)	"Best Day of My Life" (with the Top 5)	American Authors	Dec. 9, 2013	24.1
Live Finale	"I'll Be There" (with the Top 3)	The Jackson 5	Dec. 16, 2013	26.1
Live Finale Results	"Tonight Is the Night" (with The Top 20)	Outasight	Dec. 17, 2013	27.1
Live Finale Results	"Love Can Move Mountains" (with Celine Dion)	Celine Dion	Dec. 17, 2013	27.3
Live Finale Results	"Hold On, I'm A Comin'" (with James Wolpert, Preston Pohl, Olivia Henken, and Grey)	Sam & Dave	Dec. 17, 2013	27.11
Live Finale Results	"Tumbling Down"	Tessanne Chin	Dec. 17, 2013	27.13

=== 2014: After The Voice and major label debut ===
On December 30, 2013, Chin was named Caribbean Journal's 2013 Artist of the Year.

Joined by runners-up Jacquie Lee and Will Champlin, she performed at the annual Rose Parade on January 1, 2014 atop the first ever The Voice float. She performed her single "Tumbling Down."

On January 12, 2014, she headlined her first show in celebration of her victory on The Voice, dubbed "Tessanne's Homecoming." The event was held in downtown Kingston and admission was free. Also performing were Shaggy, Wayne Marshall, Assassin/Agent Sasco, and fellow reggae songstress Alaine. That night, she was presented a Gold Medal of the City of Kingston and a citation by Mayor Angela Brown Burke.

On February 15, 2014, she performed at the 21st annual 9 Mile Music Festival in Miami, Florida alongside Lauryn Hill, Stephen Marley, Damian Marley, Julian Marley, Sean Paul, Shaggy, Mavado, and many others.

On February 25, 2014, she performed in Trinidad along with Kes The Band at the "Tuesdays On The Rock" concert.

She performed at the White House on March 6, 2014, for President Barack Obama and First Lady Michelle Obama's "In Performance at the White House" series, with other acts including Melissa Etheridge, Aretha Franklin, Ariana Grande, Patti LaBelle, Janelle Monáe, and Jill Scott with Greg Phillinganes as the music director, for a concert celebrating women of soul, dubbed "Women of Soul: In Performance at The White House." There, she sang Donna Summer's "Last Dance" then later joined Jill Scott, Melissa Etheridge, Patti LaBelle, Janelle Monáe, and Ariana Grande for a tribute to Tina Turner, performing her rendition of "Proud Mary." The event was broadcast on PBS on April 7, 2014.

Chin was honored at the University of the West Indies Fifth Annual Toronto Benefit Gala at the Ritz Carlton hotel on March 29, 2014, where she was given a Luminary Award alongside her long-time mentor, reggae singer Jimmy Cliff. That night, Toronto philanthropists Michael Lee-Chin and Raymond Chang engaged in an impromptu bidding war to persuade Chin to sing her first song on Canadian soil. In the end, Mr. Lee-Chin topped the bidding with $40,000 and requested Chin perform three songs. Proceeds of the bidding went to scholarships for the Caribbean-based university system.

She performed at the Digicel Barbados Reggae Festival on April 27, 2014, in Barbados.

Chin performed at the McDonald's Global owners concert held in Orlando, Florida on May 1, 2014. There, she performed the Whitney Houston rendition of "I Will Always Love You," and "I Have Nothing" accompanied by David Foster on the piano. She also joined Ne-Yo in performing his song "Incredible." Other acts of the concert included her former coach of The Voice Adam Levine and Sting.

She performed at the Nautical Music Festival in Antigua at the closing of Antigua Sailing Week on May 3, 2014 alongside Christopher Martin as well as reggae artist Barrington Levy, amongst many others.

She performed for Roma Downey and her husband Mark Burnett at the 2014 Entertainment Industry Dinner in honor for their vision, leadership, accomplishments and contributions to the entertainment community on May 8, 2014, alongside gospel/pop group RAISE and vocal super group The Tenors at the Beverly Hilton Hotel in Beverly Hills.

On May 17, 2014, she performed at the Sony Centre for the Performing Arts in Toronto, Ontario, Canada. There, she performed a medley of songs from "In Between Words," songs she performed on The Voice, and her two singles "Tumbling Down and "Everything Reminds Me of You" from her album "Count On My Love." Guest performers at the concert were vocal super group The Tenors, with whom she did a cover of "Hallelujah" with

She performed at the first Oracabessa Festival, "A Celebration Of Caribbean Culture" on Monday, May 26, 2014, alongside Beenie Man, Konshens, and Assassin/Agent Sasco. The event was held at Roy Wilkins Park in Queens, New York.

Chin headlined "The Voice Summer Tour 2014" which began on June 21 in San Antonio, Texas and concluded in Redmond, Washington on August 2, 2014. She was joined by Season 5 runner-up Jacquie Lee and third place finalist Will Champlin, along with Season 1 runner-up Dia Frampton as well as the winner of Season 6 of The Voice, Josh Kaufman and other finalists of Season 6. "The Voice Summer Tour 2014" is sponsored by shampoo brand Clear Scalp & Hair. Two promotional ads featuring Chin have been released for the campaign, as well as an instructional video.

She sang at the 2014 St. Lucia Jazz and Arts Festival on Sunday, May 11, 2014, performing alongside reggae legend Barrington Levy, as well as Alison Hinds, Commodores, Elvis Crespo, KEM, Maxwell, Monty Alexander, Omar Sosa, P Square, Teddyson John, Alternative Quartet, Blue Mangó and Grammy and Tony Award-winning Dee Dee Bridgewater.

She performed at Reggae Sumfest in Jamaica on July 19, 2014, alongside Wiz Khalifa, Jason Derulo, Future, Beenie Man, Sean Paul, Jah Cure, Chronixx, and Freddie McGregor. This marks Chin's third performance at the festival.

Chin released her major label debut album, Count On My Love, under Republic Records on July 1, 2014. During the conception of the album, Chin collaborated with Damian Marley as well as longtime mentor Shaggy; however, these tracks did not make the album. The possibility of a collaboration with Ne-Yo was also mentioned, but ultimately did not come into fruition. She expressed a desire to do some of the album's recording in Jamaica at Portland's GeeJam recording studio, but ultimately recorded the album throughout various studios within the United States.

Producers for the album are Jerry "Wonda" Duplessis, Stargate, Shama "Sak Pase" Joseph, Mark "Exit" Goodchild, Shaun Pizzonia aka Sting International, MadMen Productions, Mitchum "Khan" Chin, and Supa Dups. With songwriters being Autumn Rowe, Rock City aka Planet VI, Claude Kelly, AC Burrell, Ryan Tedder of OneRepublic, Lil Eddie, and legendary songwriter Diane Warren. Toby Gad, Chuck Harmony, and Johnny Black are confirmed for the album, however it is currently unknown whether they contributed as writers or producers. Her second single, titled "Everything Reminds Me of You" written by Rock City aka Planet VI, was debuted during the Season 6 semifinal round of The Voice with a live performance.

Chin co-wrote five songs: "Everything Reminds Me of You", "Count On My Love", "Always Tomorrow", "Lifeline" and "Heaven Knows," and wrote "One Step Closer." She stated in an interview with Direct Lyrics that she's a writer as much as she's a singer and thanked Rock City, Claude Kelly and Toby Gad for taking that into account.

The album debuted at forty-one on the Billboard 200 charts and at twenty on the Top Digital Albums charts. The album sold 7,000 copies in its first week according to Billboard.com, making it the lowest first week sales of a The Voice winner. The album was highly criticized for the lack of promotional activities it received from Republic Records and The Voice.

=== Since 2015: New label debut ===
Chin shared on her Facebook page that she planned to release the background song which was featured in her clear scalp and hair commercial. It was co-written by Balewa Muhammad while produced and released by J.U.S.T.I.C.E. League. "Fire" is the first official single released on the newly formed Justice League Music Group.

On April 26, 2015, Chin performed at the 42nd Daytime Emmy Awards where she performed the musical classic "What I Did for Love".

Chin performed at the National Memorial Day Concert held in Washington, D.C., on May 24, 2015, performing alongside Joe Mantegna, Gloria Estefan, Stephanie Scott, Katherine Jenkins, Russell Watson amongst others where she covered Whitney Houston's version of I Will Always Love You.

Chin is in the process of releasing a new album. Chin thus has far collaborated with American rapper T.I. and producer Lil' C as well as Jamaican songwriter/vocalist Olaf Blackwood for the upcoming album which remains untitled.

Chin appears on the 2018 single, "Let Me Love You" with GrooveGalore and Honorebel. The single is also included on Honorebel's album, "Above The Noise" (2019).

In September 2019, Chin announced she was pregnant with her first child, a girl, on her Twitter and Instagram accounts. She also remarried in June of that year.

== Philanthropy ==
Tessanne co-headlined Shaggy's benefit concert Shaggy and Friends, along with notable artists such as Shaggy himself, Ne-Yo, Sean Paul, Elephant Man, Wayne Marshall, Assassin/Agent Sasco, Tarrus Riley, Konshens, I-Octane, and The Voice Season 5 Top 6 finalist Matthew Schuler, among many others. Other artists such as Damian Marley and Jah Cure made guest appearances. All proceeds went toward the Bustamante Hospital for Children in Kingston.

Tessanne performed at the 19th Annual Building Hope Gala Fundraiser and Silent Auction held by the Food for the Poor Organisation based in Florida on Saturday, February 1, 2014. There, she performed her single "Tumbling Down" to encourage attendees to replace poor families’ dilapidated huts in Ganthier, Haiti with safe, permanent houses.

Tessanne joined the Lupus Foundation of America and performed at their annual event in Washington on May 20, 2014. The concert celebrated Senator Tom Harkin of Iowa for his public service, extraordinary leadership and contributions to the advancement of science and medicine in supporting Americans with disabilities and chronic diseases, such as lupus.

She made a performance at the JDRF "Toast to Tomorrow" charity Gala where they had an auction on several items to raise funds for the Juvenile Diabetes Research Foundation. The event was held on October 11, 2014, in Minneapolis Marriott City Center, Minneapolis

She made a performance at the 24th annual "Divas Simply Singing". Alongside Loretta Divine, Jenifer Lewis, Reneé Lawless, Paula Jai Parker, Lil Mo, Michelle and Anita Wilson. The event also feature four male vocalist Jamar Rogers, Kenny Lattimore, Alex Newell and Anthony Wayne. The charity is dedicated to raise funds, awareness and erase stigma associated with patients who have contracted HIV/AIDS. Dionne Warwick was honored at the event by Sheryl Lee and friends for her longtime commitment of HIV/AIDS research and support.

In efforts to spread awareness and to eradicate Polio, Chin partnered with Rotary International on "World Polio Day" in which she made a performance at the event "World Polio Day and a live global update" held in Chicago, Illinois on October 24, 2014.

== Discography ==
=== Studio albums ===
Title	Album details	Peak chart positions	Sales
Title	Album details	US	Sales
In Between Words	Release: December 6, 2010; Label: Independent; Formats: digital download	—	
Count On My Love	Release: July 1, 2014; Label: Republic, Universal; Formats: CD, digital download	41	US: 7,000 (first week)

=== Singles ===
Title	Year	Peak chart positions	Album
Title	Year	JAM Air.	Album
"Hideaway"	2006	2	In Between Words
"Black Books"	2007	*	In Between Words
"Messenger"	2008	*	In Between Words
"Loving You" (featuring Kees Dieffenthaller)	2010	*	In Between Words
"Are Yah Gonna (Control)"	2011	*	In Between Words
"Tumbling Down"	2013	*	Count On My Love
"Incredible Love"	2013	*	Strictly The Best vol. 48; Compilation by Various Artists
"Anything's Possible"	2013	*	Rising Sun Riddim; Compilation by Various Artists
"Everything Reminds Me of You"	2014	*	Count On My Love
"Fire"	2015	*	Non-album single
"*" denotes that the chart did not exist at that time.

=== Releases from The Voice ===
Title	Album details	Peak chart positions
Title	Album details	US Heat
The Complete Season 5 Collection	Release date: December 17, 2013; Label: Republic Records; Formats: Digital download	4

Awards and achievements
Preceded by Danielle Bradbery	The Voice (American); Winner; 2013 (Winter)	Succeeded by Josh Kaufman
Preceded by "Born to Fly"	The Voice (American); Winner's song "Tumbling Down"; 2013 (Winter)	Succeeded by Set Fire to the Rain
