= Tumbling Down (Tessanne Chin song) =

Single by Tessanne Chin

from the album Count on My Love
- Released: December 17, 2013
- Recorded: December 2013
- Genre: Pop
- Length: 3:35
- Label: Republic
- Songwriter(s): Ryan Tedder, Noel Zancanella, MoZella, Lil' Eddie
- Producer(s): Peter Svensson

Tessanne Chin singles chronology
"Tumbling Down" (2013)	"Everything Reminds Me of You" (2014)

"Tumbling Down" is the coronation song of The Voice Season 5 winner Tessanne Chin. The song is written by Ryan Tedder of OneRepublic and serves as Chin's first official single after her win, although she has had some unofficial independent singles released earlier in her career and some of her performances on the show have charted. It is the first track on Chin's major label debut album, Count on My Love.

== Background ==
After signing on as The Voice's first-ever in-house producer and songwriter, Ryan Tedder and his songwriting partner Noel Zancanella penned "Tumbling Down" for the winner of Season 5 of The Voice. After admittedly having difficulty writing for the three potential winners, they decided to roll the dice and write the song with Tessanne Chin in mind, based on her prior success on the iTunes charts. With a personal dislike for traditional "this is my moment" American Idol-esque coronation songs, Tedder and his partner instead opted to write a song people can relate to that they would pitch to artists of the caliber of Rihanna or Kelly Clarkson.

The song is an original composition for the winner of The Voice, only the second after Javier Colon's song "Stitch by Stitch" in Season 1. The winner's songs from the previous seasons were all covers of well-known hits, namely: "I Believe I Can Fly" by R. Kelly performed by Season 2 winner Jermaine Paul, "Cry" by Faith Hill performed by Season 3 winner Cassadee Pope, and "Born to Fly" by Sara Evans performed by Season 4 winner Danielle Bradbery.

== Live performances ==
On December 18, 2013, the night after winning Season 5 of The Voice, Chin performed "Tumbling Down" on The Tonight Show with Jay Leno. The following day, during her extensive post-victory media run, she performed the song on a variety of stages, including Live! with Kelly and Michael, Entertainment Weekly, and Access Hollywood. On December 30, 2013, she performed the song on KTLA. Joined by runners-up Jacquie Lee and Will Champlin, she performed the song at the annual Rose Parade on January 1, 2014 atop the first ever The Voice float. On January 4, 2014, she performed a reggae-flavored remix of the song during her set at reggae/dancehall star Shaggy's benefit concert Shaggy and Friends. On January 25, 2014, she performed the song at Lure Nightclub in Hollywood for an audience of label and publishing executives as well as media.
