= The Voice (American TV series) season 5 =

The Voice
- Season 5
- Promotional poster featuring coaches Levine, Green, Shelton, and Aguilera
- Hosted by: Carson Daly
- Coaches: Adam Levine; CeeLo Green; Christina Aguilera; Blake Shelton
- No. of contestants: 48 artists
- Winner: Tessanne Chin
- Winning coach: Adam Levine
- Runner-up: Jacquie Lee

Release
- Original network: NBC
- Original release: September 23 – December 17, 2013

Season chronology
- ← Previous; Season 4 Next → Season 6

The fifth season of the American reality talent show The Voice premiered on September 23, 2013 on NBC. Adam Levine and Blake Shelton returned as coaches for their fifth season, while CeeLo Green and Christina Aguilera returned after being replaced by Usher and Shakira in season 4. This was Green's last season as a coach.

This is the first season to extend the use of steals in the knockout round, which was previously made available only in the Battle rounds; and the Instant Save during live shows, allowing Twitter's tweets from the viewers (based on the airing of East Coast/Pacific time zones) to save a contestant eligible from elimination. The iTunes multiplier bonus introduced on season 3 also returned but the multiplier was reduced to five, which was still applied till this day.

Carson Daly returned to host the show, but Christina Milian did not return as the social media correspondent and Daly assumed the roles for both.

Tessanne Chin was named the winner of the season as the first foreign artist to win the show, marking Adam Levine's second win as a coach.

== Coaches and hosts ==
CeeLo Green and Christina Aguilera returned from their hiatus and rejoined Adam Levine and Blake Shelton. Usher and Shakira were confirmed to return for the following season. Carson Daly returned as host, but Christina Milian did not return as social media correspondent, as she wished to focus on her new album, and to compete on Season 17 of Dancing with the Stars. Daly then assumed the position as the social media correspondent.

Coaches and Host of The Voice Season 5

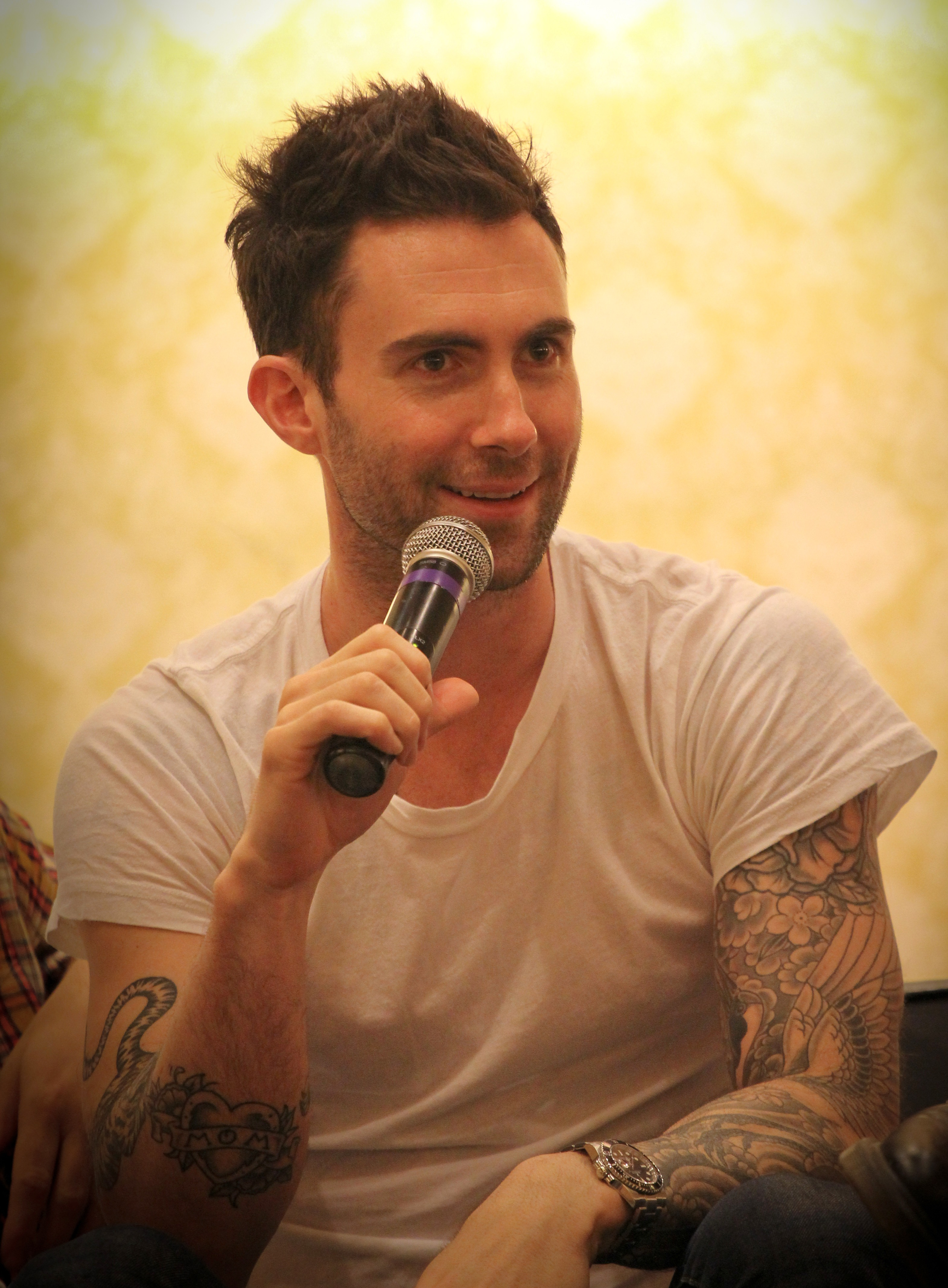
Adam Levine

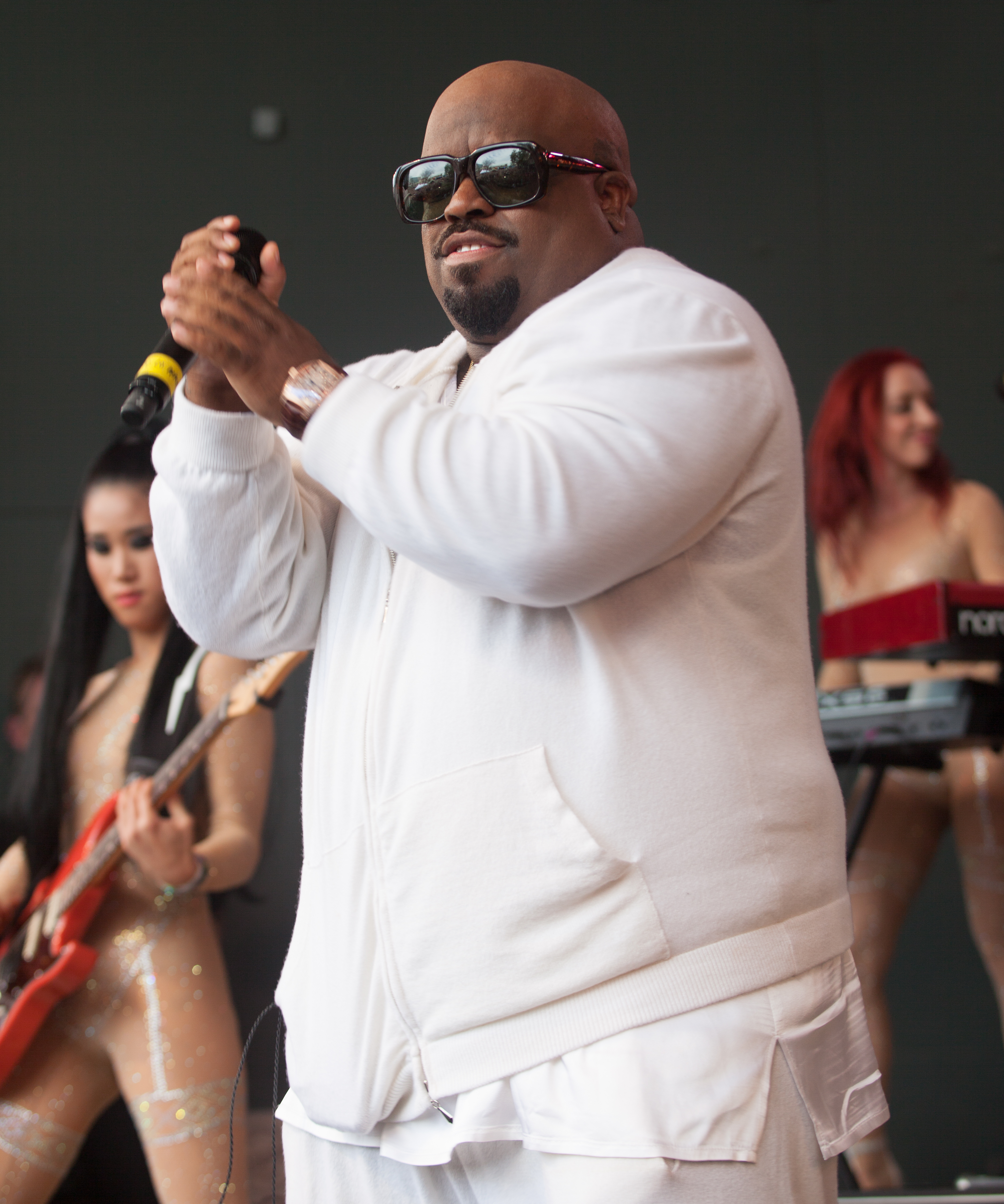
CeeLo Green

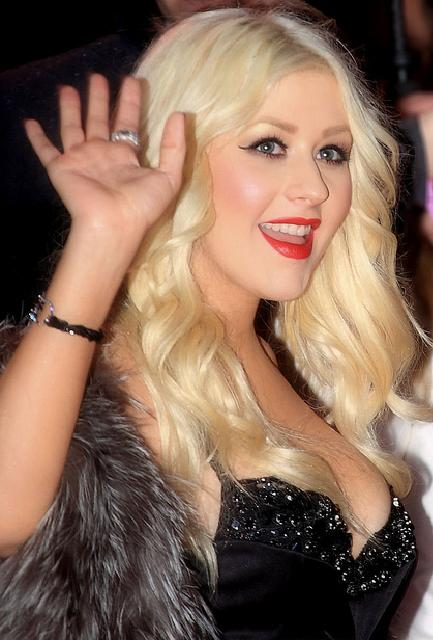
Christina Aguilera

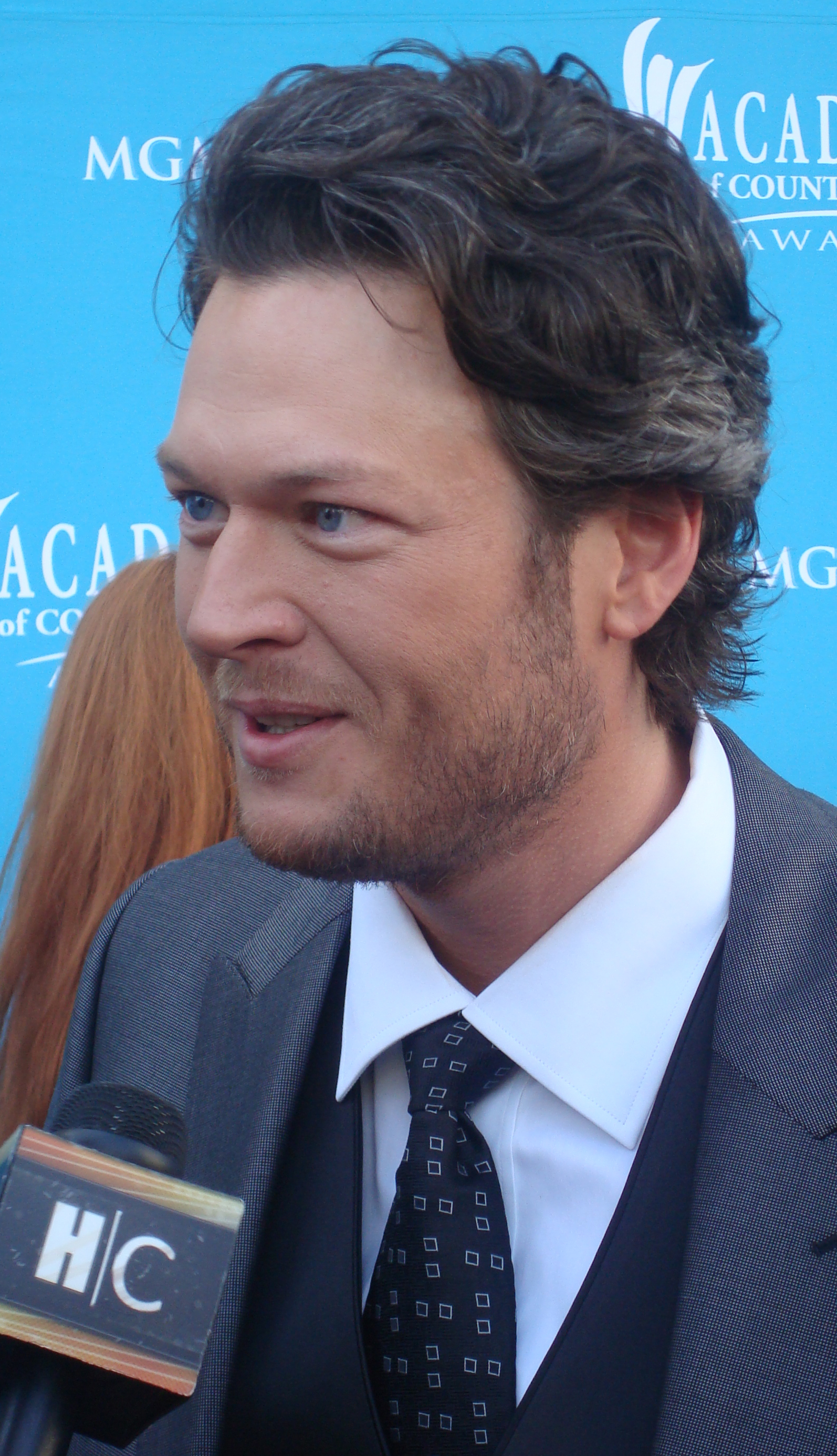
Blake Shelton

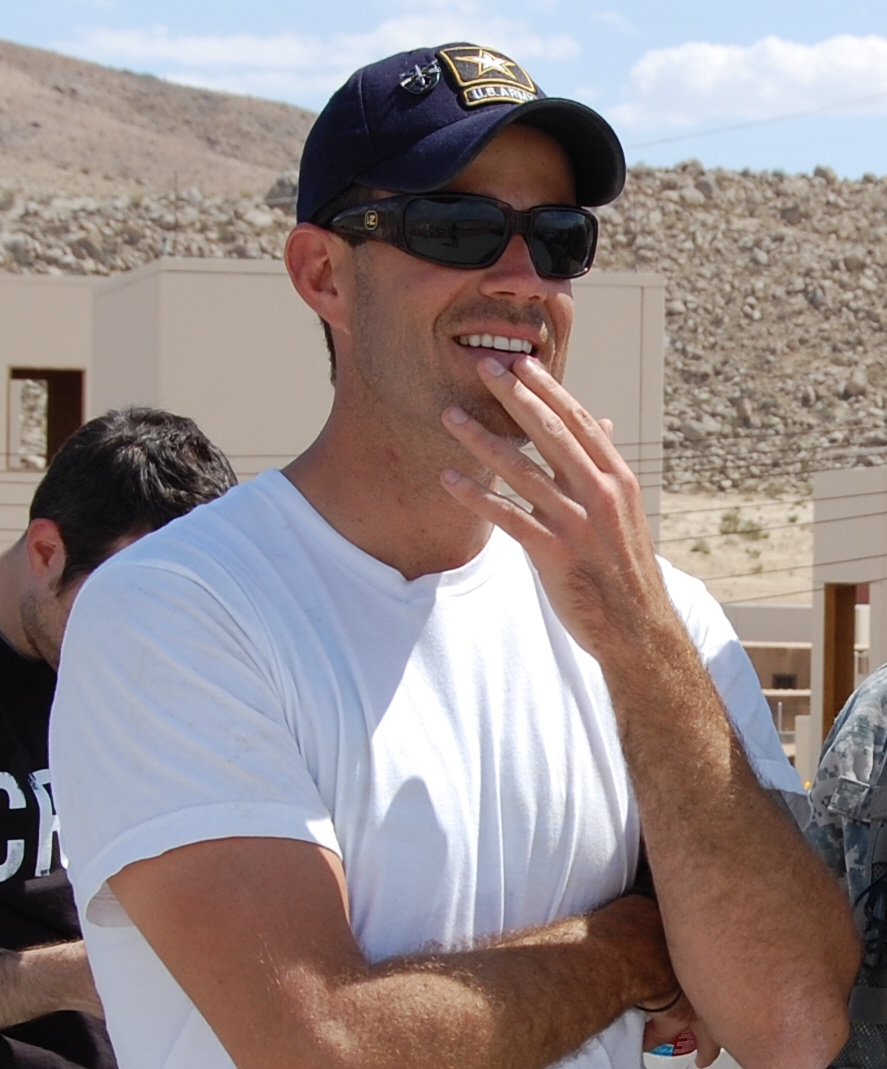
Carson Daly

In February 2014, Green announced his departure from The Voice and thus making it his last season for the show.

== Auditions ==
Cities where the auditions were held

The open call auditions were held in the following locations:

Date	Venue	Location
January 13–14, 2013	Donald E. Stephens Convention Center	Chicago, Illinois
January 20–21, 2013	Atlanta Convention Center	Atlanta, Georgia
February 3–4, 2013	Los Angeles Convention Center	Los Angeles, California
February 9, 2013	Reliant Center	Houston, Texas
February 16–17, 2013	Jacob K. Javits Convention Center	New York City, New York

== Teams ==
Color key

- Winner
- Runner-up
- Third Place
- Semi-finalist
- Eliminated in the Live playoffs
- Artist was stolen by another coach at the Knockout rounds
- Eliminated in the Knockout rounds
- Artist was stolen by another coach at the Battle rounds
- Eliminated in the Battle rounds

Coaches	Top 48 artists				
Adam Levine					
Adam Levine	Tessanne Chin	Will Champlin	James Wolpert	Grey Paluszynski	Preston Pohl
Adam Levine	Ashley DuBose	Lina Gaudenzi	James Irwin	Juhi Pathak	~~Will Champlin~~
Adam Levine	~~Nic Hawk~~	Donna Allen	Barry Black	Justin Blake	Matt Cermanski
CeeLo Green					
CeeLo Green	Caroline Pennell	Kat Robichaud	Jonny Gray	Tamara Chauniece	Amber Nicole
CeeLo Green	~~Stephanie Anne Johnson~~	~~Cole Vosbury~~	George Horga Jr.	Monika Leigh	~~Juhi~~
CeeLo Green	~~Anthony Paul~~	R. Anthony	Lupe Carroll	Keaira LaShae	Shawn Smith
Christina Aguilera					
Christina Aguilera	Jacquie Lee	Matthew Schuler	Josh Logan	Olivia Henken	Stephanie Anne Johnson
Christina Aguilera	~~Will Champlin~~	~~Amber Nicole~~	Anthony Paul	Destinee Quinn	~~Stephanie Anne Johnson~~
Christina Aguilera	~~Lina Gaudenzi~~	~~Briana Cuoco~~	Michael Lynch	Jacob Poole	Timyra-Joi Beatty
Blake Shelton					
Blake Shelton	Cole Vosbury	Ray Boudreaux	Austin Jenckes	Nic Hawk	Shelbie Zora
Blake Shelton	Brandon Chase	Briana Cuoco	E. G. Daily	Holly Henry	~~Monika Leigh~~
Blake Shelton	Sam Cerniglia	Cilla Chan	Justin Chain	Brian Pounds	Emily Randolph
Note: Italicized names are stolen artists (names struck through within former teams).

== Blind auditions ==
The blind auditions were taped from July 9 to 12, 2013. The first episode of the Blind auditions premiered on September 23, 2013.

Color key

✔	Coach hit his/her "I WANT YOU" button
	Artist defaulted to this coach's team
	Artist selected to join this coach's team
	Artist eliminated with no coach pressing his or her "I WANT YOU" button

=== Episode 1 (Sept. 23) ===
The coaches performed "I Love Rock 'n' Roll" at the start of the show.

Order	Artist	Age	Hometown	Song	Coach's and artist's choices			
Order	Artist	Age	Hometown	Song	Adam	CeeLo	Christina	Blake
1	Kat Robichaud	29	Raleigh, North Carolina	"I've Got the Music in Me"	—	✔	✔	✔
2	Caroline Pennell	17	Saddle River, New Jersey	"Anything Could Happen"	—	✔	—	✔
3	Donna Allen	54	Hollywood, Florida	"You Are So Beautiful"	✔	—	✔	—
4	Jake Worthington	17	La Porte, Texas	"Keep Your Hands to Yourself"	—	—	—	—
5	Matthew Schuler	20	Yardley, Pennsylvania	"Cough Syrup"	✔	✔	✔	✔
6	Nic Hawk	26	Dallas, Texas	"Hit 'Em Up Style (Oops!)"	✔	✔	—	—
7	Julianna Baston	17	White Plains, New York	"It's Time"	—	—	—	—
8	Samuel Mancini	19	Pittsburgh, Pennsylvania	"What Makes You Beautiful"	—	—	—	—
9	Franchika	15	Chicago, Illinois	"U Smile"	—	—	—	—
10	Mathew Brea	15	Atlanta, Georgia	"I Want You Back"	—	—	—	—
11	Shelbie Z	21	Jasper, Alabama	"Here for the Party"	—	✔	✔	✔
12	Josh Logan	33	Manchester, New Hampshire	"Too Close"	✔	—	✔	✔
13	Delvin Choice	24	Greenville, South Carolina	"Closer"	—	—	—	—
14	James Wolpert	22	Strasburg, Pennsylvania	"Love Interruption"	✔	✔	✔	✔

=== Episode 2 (Sept. 24) ===
Order	Artist	Age	Hometown	Song	Coach's and artist's choices			
Order	Artist	Age	Hometown	Song	Adam	CeeLo	Christina	Blake
1	Jacquie Lee	16	Colts Neck, New Jersey	"Back to Black"	—	—	✔	✔
2	Barry Black	27	Las Vegas, Nevada	"What You Won't Do for Love"	✔	—	—	✔
3	Mike Unser	19	Pleasant Hill, Ohio	"Dirty Little Secret"	—	—	—	—
4	Destinee Quinn	20	Surprise, Arizona	"Cowboy Take Me Away"	—	✔	✔	—
5	Cole Vosbury	22	Shreveport, Louisiana	"Movin' On Up"	—	✔	—	—
6	Holly Henry	19	Minneapolis, Minnesota	"The Scientist"	✔	✔	✔	✔
7	Sammy C.	16	Newport Beach, California	"Where Is the Love?"	—	—	—	—
8	Morgan Mallory	N/A	Aloha, Oregon	"I Won't Give Up"	—	—	—	—
9	ShayMari	N/A	Chicago, Illinois	"Santeria"	—	—	—	—
10	Seth Cook	19	Yorktown, Indiana	"Anywhere with You"	—	—	—	—
11	Austin Jenckes	25	Duvall, Washington	"Simple Man"	—	✔	—	✔
12	E. G. Daily	52	Hollywood, California	"Breathe"	—	✔	—	✔
13	Jonny Gray	29	Austin, Texas	"All These Things That I've Done"	✔	✔	—	—
14	Tessanne Chin	28	Kingston, Jamaica	"Try"	✔	✔	✔	✔

=== Episode 3 (Sept. 30) ===
Order	Artist	Age	Hometown	Song	Coach's and artist's choices			
Order	Artist	Age	Hometown	Song	Adam	CeeLo	Christina	Blake
1	Ray Boudreaux	25	Lafayette, Louisiana	"Use Me"	—	✔	—	✔
2	Lina Gaudenzi	23	Miami, Florida	"Landslide"	—	—	✔	✔
3	Juhi	16	Franklin, Tennessee	"Mercy"	—	✔	✔	—
4	Malford Milligan	54	Austin, Texas	"Let's Stay Together"	—	—	—	—
5	John Travis	N/A	Loxahatchee, Florida	"You're Gonna Miss This"	—	—	—	—
6	Kenny Araujo	15	East Haven, Connecticut	"In My Head"	—	—	—	—
7	Jeremiah Richey	32	Waxahachie, Texas	"Missing You"	—	—	—	—
8	Justin Blake	20	Savannah, Tennessee	"Sure Be Cool If You Did"	✔	—	—	—
9	Timyra-Joi	15	San Diego, California	"Girl on Fire"	—	✔	✔	✔
10	Monika Leigh	28	Boulder, Colorado	"The Thrill Is Gone"	✔	✔	—	✔
11	Zach Hinson	21	Yakima, Washington	"Drunk on You"	—	—	—	—
12	Briana Cuoco	24	Los Angeles, California	"You and I"	—	✔	✔	—
13	George Horga Jr.	19	Portland, Oregon	"Treasure"	—	✔	—	—
14	Anthony Paul	18	Twinsburg, Ohio	"With You"	—	✔	—	—
15	Cilla Chan	22	Singapore /San Jose, California	"Come & Get It"	—	—	—	✔
16	Jacob Poole	30	Warner Robins, Georgia	"Marry Me"	—	—	✔	—
17	Preston Pohl	26	Hallettsville, Texas	"Electric Feel"	✔	✔	—	✔

=== Episode 4 (Oct. 1) ===
Order	Artist	Age	Hometown	Song	Coach's and artist's choices			
Order	Artist	Age	Hometown	Song	Adam	CeeLo	Christina	Blake
1	Will Champlin	30	Reseda, California	"Not Over You"	✔	✔	—	✔
2	Macey Estes	18	Greenwood, Indiana	"The Way"	—	—	—	—
3	Stephanie Anne Johnson	29	Tacoma, Washington	"Black Horse and the Cherry Tree"	—	✔	✔	—
4	Sam Cerniglia	25	Chicago, Illinois	"It's a Beautiful Day"	—	✔	—	✔
5	Jennifer Newberry	32	Sweden /Seattle, Washington	"Locked Out of Heaven"	—	—	—	—
6	Yasmin	N/A	N/A	"Love Song"	—	—	—	—
7	Roy Schneider	41	Fort Myers, Florida	"Fortunate Son"	—	—	—	—
8	Manuel Romero	N/A	San Jose, California	"Lego House"	—	—	—	—
9	James Irwin	31	St. Louis, Missouri	"Losing My Religion"	✔	✔	✔	✔
10	Olivia Henken	25	Louisville, Kentucky	"Two Black Cadillacs"	—	✔	✔	—
11	Jason Kertson	16	Seattle, Washington	"Lips of an Angel"	—	—	—	—
12	R. Anthony	33	Tampa, Florida	"Hall of Fame"	—	✔	✔	—
13	Keaira LaShae	30	Los Angeles, California	"Killing Me Softly with His Song"	—	✔	—	—
14	Amber Nicole	17	Houston, Texas	"Russian Roulette"	—	✔	✔	—
15	Emily Randolph	15	Tacoma, Washington	"Every Rose Has Its Thorn"	—	—	—	✔
16	Justin Chain	23	Fort Payne, Alabama	"She's Country"	—	—	—	✔
17	Ashley DuBose	23	St. Paul, Minnesota	"Diamonds"	✔	✔	✔	✔

=== Episode 5 (Oct. 7) ===
Order	Artist	Age	Hometown	Song	Coach's and artist's choices			
Order	Artist	Age	Hometown	Song	Adam	CeeLo	Christina	Blake
1	Matt Cermanski	20	Phoenixville, Pennsylvania	"Have a Little Faith in Me"	✔	✔	—	✔
2	Diego Roman Navaira	22	San Antonio, Texas	"Rebel Yell"	—	—	—	—
3	Tamara Chauniece	23	Wharton, Texas	"1+1"	—	✔	✔	—
4	Brandon Chase	20	Arlington, Texas	"Wanted"	—	✔	—	✔
5	Lupe Carroll	26	Bourbonnais, Illinois	"If I Were a Carpenter"	—	✔	—	—
6	Grey	25	Jacksonville, Florida	"Catch My Breath"	✔	✔	—	✔
7	Dominic Scott Kay	17	Malibu, California	"Easy"	Team full	—	—	—
8	Michael Lynch	27	Chicago, Illinois	"Bailamos"	Team full	✔	✔	✔
9	Deanna Johnson	17	Hazlehurst, Georgia	"Stars"	Team full	—	Team full	—
10	Brian Pounds	24	Austin, Texas	"Wagon Wheel"	Team full	✔	Team full	✔
11	Marc Wulf	N/A	Orange County, California	"Black and Gold"	Team full	—	Team full	Team full
12	Danielle Walsh	21	San Francisco, California	"Back It Up"	Team full	—	Team full	Team full
13	Ty Wyffels	N/A	Metamora, Illinois	"Tonight, Tonight"	Team full	—	Team full	Team full
14	Shawn Smith	32	Utica, New York	"Chicken Fried"	Team full	✔	Team full	Team full

=== Episode 6 (Oct. 8) ===
Episode six feature a recap compilation of the "best of blind auditions," featuring the composition of the four teams, behind-the-scenes footage of the first five episodes, and a sneak peek of the battle rounds. A clip of the music video for Cassadee Pope's "Wasting All These Tears" was shown, to promote her debut album Frame by Frame, which was released on the same day.

== The Battles ==
The Battle rounds (episodes 7 to 10) comprised two 2-hour episodes and two 1-hour episodes each on October 14, 15, 21 and 22, 2013 with six battles in each episode. The coaches once again utilized mentors during this round and each has enlisted the help of the following: Adam Levine brought in OneRepublic's lead singer, Ryan Tedder; CeeLo Green brought in Miguel; Christina Aguilera brought in Ed Sheeran; and finally, Blake Shelton brought in Cher. Continuing with the format introduced in season 3, the coaches can steal two losing artists from another coach.

Color key:

Artist won the Battle and advanced to the Knockouts
Artist lost the Battle but advanced to the Knockouts after being stolen by another coach
Artist lost the Battle and was eliminated

Episode	Coach	Order	Winner	Song	Loser	'Steal' result			
Episode	Coach	Order	Winner	Song	Loser	Adam	CeeLo	Christina	Blake
Episode 7^{1} (Monday, Oct. 14, 2013)	Adam Levine	1	Grey	"Domino"	Nic Hawk	—N/a	—	—	✔
Episode 7^{1} (Monday, Oct. 14, 2013)	Christina Aguilera	2	Amber Nicole	"Listen"	Timyra-Joi	—	—	—N/a	—
Episode 7^{1} (Monday, Oct. 14, 2013)	Blake Shelton	3	Shelbie Z	"Don't You Wanna Stay"	Justin Chain	—	—	—	—N/a
Episode 7^{1} (Monday, Oct. 14, 2013)	CeeLo Green	4	Caroline Pennell	"As Long as You Love Me"	Anthony Paul	—	—N/a	✔	—
Episode 7^{1} (Monday, Oct. 14, 2013)	Adam Levine	5	Tessanne Chin	"Next to Me"	Donna Allen	—N/a	—	—	—
Episode 7^{1} (Monday, Oct. 14, 2013)	Christina Aguilera	6	Jacquie Lee	"The House of the Rising Sun"	Briana Cuoco	—	✔	—N/a	✔
Episode 8^{2} (Tuesday, Oct. 15, 2013)	Christina Aguilera	1	Matthew Schuler	"My Songs Know What You Did in the Dark (Light Em Up)"	Jacob Poole	—	—	—N/a	Team full
Episode 8^{2} (Tuesday, Oct. 15, 2013)	CeeLo Green	2	Kat Robichaud	"I Don't Want to Miss a Thing"	R. Anthony	—	—N/a	—	Team full
Episode 8^{2} (Tuesday, Oct. 15, 2013)	CeeLo Green	3	Cole Vosbury	"Africa"	Lupe Carroll	—	—N/a	—	Team full
Episode 8^{2} (Tuesday, Oct. 15, 2013)	Blake Shelton	4	E. G. Daily	"Something to Talk About"	Sam Cerniglia	—	—	—	Team full
Episode 8^{2} (Tuesday, Oct. 15, 2013)	Adam Levine	5	Ashley DuBose	"Just a Fool"	Justin Blake	—N/a	—	—	Team full
Episode 8^{2} (Tuesday, Oct. 15, 2013)	Blake Shelton	6	Ray Boudreaux	"Some Kind of Wonderful"	Monika Leigh	—	✔	—	Team full
Episode 9^{1} (Monday, Oct. 21, 2013)	Christina Aguilera	1	Josh Logan	"Harder to Breathe"	Michael Lynch	—	—	—N/a	Team full
Episode 9^{1} (Monday, Oct. 21, 2013)	CeeLo Green	2	George Horga Jr.	"Best I Ever Had"	Juhi	✔	—N/a	—	Team full
Episode 9^{1} (Monday, Oct. 21, 2013)	Blake Shelton	3	Austin Jenckes	"To Love Somebody"	Brian Pounds	—	—	—	Team full
Episode 9^{1} (Monday, Oct. 21, 2013)	Adam Levine	4	James Irwin	"Counting Stars"	Matt Cermanski	—N/a	—	—	Team full
Episode 9^{1} (Monday, Oct. 21, 2013)	Christina Aguilera	5	Destinee Quinn	"Not Ready to Make Nice"	Lina Gaudenzi	✔	—	—N/a	Team full
Episode 9^{1} (Monday, Oct. 21, 2013)	Adam Levine	6	James Wolpert	"Radioactive"	Will Champlin	Team full	—	✔	Team full
Episode 10^{2} (Tuesday, Oct. 22, 2013)	CeeLo Green	1	Jonny Gray	"Refugee"	Shawn Smith	Team full	—N/a	Team full	Team full
Episode 10^{2} (Tuesday, Oct. 22, 2013)	Adam Levine	2	Preston Pohl	"I Wish It Would Rain"	Barry Black	Team full	—	Team full	Team full
Episode 10^{2} (Tuesday, Oct. 22, 2013)	Blake Shelton	3	Holly Henry	"Torn"	Cilla Chan	Team full	—	Team full	Team full
Episode 10^{2} (Tuesday, Oct. 22, 2013)	Blake Shelton	4	Brandon Chase	"Tiny Dancer"	Emily Randolph	Team full	—	Team full	Team full
Episode 10^{2} (Tuesday, Oct. 22, 2013)	CeeLo Green	5	Tamara Chauniece	"Big Girls Don't Cry"	Keaira LaShae	Team full	—N/a	Team full	Team full
Episode 10^{2} (Tuesday, Oct. 22, 2013)	Christina Aguilera	6	Olivia Henken	"Done"	Stephanie Anne Johnson	Team full	✔	Team full	Team full

^1 Episodes airing on Monday had a running time of two hours.
^2 Episodes airing on Tuesday & Sunday had a running time of one hour.

== The Knockouts ==
For the first time this series, steals are available to use during the Knockouts; each coach has one Steal to save any one losing artist from another coach. There were 16 Knockout matchups in two 2-hour episodes and only 20 artists advanced on to the Live Shows.

Color key:

Artist won the Knockout and advanced to the Live Shows
Artist lost the Knockout but advanced to the Knockouts after being stolen by another coach
Artist lost the Knockout and was eliminated

Episode	Coach	Order	Song	Artists		Song	'Steal' result			
Episode	Coach	Order	Song	Winner	Loser	Song	Adam	CeeLo	Christina	Blake
Episode 11 (Monday, Oct. 28, 2013)	Christina Aguilera	1	"Living for the City"	Josh Logan	Amber Nicole	"Mamma Knows Best"	—	✔	—N/a	✔
Episode 11 (Monday, Oct. 28, 2013)	CeeLo Green	2	"You Oughta Know"	Kat Robichaud	Monika Leigh	"Hit the Road, Jack"	—	Team full	—	—
Episode 11 (Monday, Oct. 28, 2013)	Blake Shelton	3	"Genie in a Bottle"	Nic Hawk	Holly Henry	"Creep"	—	Team full	—	—N/a
Episode 11 (Monday, Oct. 28, 2013)	Adam Levine	4	"Stronger (What Doesn't Kill You)"	Tessanne Chin	Ashley DuBose	"Hey, Soul Sister"	—N/a	Team full	—	—
Episode 11 (Monday, Oct. 28, 2013)	Blake Shelton	5	"Last Name"	Shelbie Z	Briana Cuoco	"Don't Speak"	—	Team full	—	—N/a
Episode 11 (Monday, Oct. 28, 2013)	Adam Levine	6	"Already Gone"	Grey	James Irwin	"Breakeven"	—N/a	Team full	—	—
Episode 11 (Monday, Oct. 28, 2013)	Christina Aguilera	7	"You're No Good"	Olivia Henken	Destinee Quinn	"See You Again"	—	Team full	—N/a	—
Episode 11 (Monday, Oct. 28, 2013)	CeeLo Green	8	"We Can Work It Out"	Jonny Gray	Cole Vosbury	"Let Her Go"	✔	Team full	—	✔
Episode 12 (Tuesday, Oct. 29, 2013)	Adam Levine	1	"No Woman, No Cry"	Preston Pohl	Lina Gaudenzi	"I'd Rather Go Blind"	—N/a	Team full	—	Team full
Episode 12 (Tuesday, Oct. 29, 2013)	Blake Shelton	2	"Hard to Handle"	Ray Boudreaux	E. G. Daily	"I Can't Make You Love Me"	—	Team full	—	Team full
Episode 12 (Tuesday, Oct. 29, 2013)	Christina Aguilera	3	"Stompa"	Jacquie Lee	Anthony Paul	"The Other Side"	—	Team full	—N/a	Team full
Episode 12 (Tuesday, Oct. 29, 2013)	CeeLo Green	4	"No One"	Tamara Chauniece	Stephanie Anne Johnson	"Don't Know Why"	—	Team full	✔	Team full
Episode 12 (Tuesday, Oct. 29, 2013)	Adam Levine	5	"More Than a Feeling"	James Wolpert	Juhi	"I Heard it Through the Grapevine"	—N/a	Team full	Team full	Team full
Episode 12 (Tuesday, Oct. 29, 2013)	Blake Shelton	6	"I'll Be"	Austin Jenckes	Brandon Chase	"Even If It Breaks Your Heart"	—	Team full	Team full	Team full
Episode 12 (Tuesday, Oct. 29, 2013)	CeeLo Green	7	"The Way I Am"	Caroline Pennell	George Horga, Jr.	"Because of You"	—	Team full	Team full	Team full
Episode 12 (Tuesday, Oct. 29, 2013)	Christina Aguilera	8	"Cosmic Love"	Matthew Schuler	Will Champlin	"When I Was Your Man"	✔	Team full	Team full	Team full

== Live shows ==
The live shows is the final phase of the competition. It consists of the playoffs, five weekly shows and the season finale.

Color key:

Artist was saved by the Public's votes
Artist was saved by his/her coach
Artist was saved by the Instant Save
Artist's iTunes vote multiplied by 5 (except The Finals) after his/her studio version of the song reached iTunes top 10
Artist was eliminated

=== Week 1: Live playoffs (Nov. 4, 5 & 7) ===
Teams Adam and Blake performed in the Playoff round on November 4, with Teams CeeLo and Christina following November 5. The results were revealed November 7, with two artists from each team eliminated.

For this season, the iTunes voting rules saw revamps during the show's live rounds, where it now award the artists a multiplier of five (previously 10) for singles which charted within the Top 10 of the iTunes "Top 200 Singles Chart" at the close of a specific episode's voting "window" (generally from the end of the episode to 10 AM Eastern time the following morning).

This week's iTunes bonus multipliers were awarded to James Wolpert (#4); Caroline Pennell's performance did peaked at the Top 10 only after the voting window ended, thus the bonus was not applied.

With the eliminations of Olivia Henken and Stephanie Ann Johnson, they pitted each other in the Battles.

Episode	Coach	Order	Artist	Song	Result
Episode 13 (Monday, Nov. 4, 2013)	Blake Shelton	1	Shelbie Z	"Fancy"	Eliminated
Episode 13 (Monday, Nov. 4, 2013)	Adam Levine	2	James Wolpert	"A Case of You"	Public's vote
Episode 13 (Monday, Nov. 4, 2013)	Blake Shelton	3	Nic Hawk	"Blurred Lines"	Eliminated
Episode 13 (Monday, Nov. 4, 2013)	Blake Shelton	4	Ray Boudreaux	"Home"	Blake's choice
Episode 13 (Monday, Nov. 4, 2013)	Blake Shelton	5	Austin Jenckes	"She Talks to Angels"	Public's vote
Episode 13 (Monday, Nov. 4, 2013)	Adam Levine	6	Grey	"Still Into You"	Eliminated
Episode 13 (Monday, Nov. 4, 2013)	Adam Levine	7	Will Champlin	"Secrets"	Adam's choice
Episode 13 (Monday, Nov. 4, 2013)	Adam Levine	8	Preston Pohl	"Nothin' on You"	Eliminated
Episode 13 (Monday, Nov. 4, 2013)	Blake Shelton	9	Cole Vosbury	"Maggie May"	Public's vote
Episode 13 (Monday, Nov. 4, 2013)	Adam Levine	10	Tessanne Chin	"Many Rivers to Cross"	Public's vote
Episode 14 (Tuesday, Nov. 5, 2013)	CeeLo Green	1	Amber Nicole	"Wasting All These Tears"	Eliminated
Episode 14 (Tuesday, Nov. 5, 2013)	CeeLo Green	2	Jonny Gray	"Bitter Sweet Symphony"	Public's vote
Episode 14 (Tuesday, Nov. 5, 2013)	CeeLo Green	3	Tamara Chauniece	"I Will Survive"	Eliminated
Episode 14 (Tuesday, Nov. 5, 2013)	CeeLo Green	4	Kat Robichaud	"She Keeps Me Warm"	CeeLo's choice
Episode 14 (Tuesday, Nov. 5, 2013)	CeeLo Green	5	Caroline Pennell	"We're Going to Be Friends"	Public's vote
Episode 14 (Tuesday, Nov. 5, 2013)	Christina Aguilera	6	Josh Logan	"Crazy"	Christina's choice
Episode 14 (Tuesday, Nov. 5, 2013)	Christina Aguilera	7	Olivia Henken	"Roar"	Eliminated
Episode 14 (Tuesday, Nov. 5, 2013)	Christina Aguilera	8	Stephanie Anne Johnson	"Georgia on My Mind"	Eliminated
Episode 14 (Tuesday, Nov. 5, 2013)	Christina Aguilera	9	Matthew Schuler	"Wrecking Ball"	Public's vote
Episode 14 (Tuesday, Nov. 5, 2013)	Christina Aguilera	10	Jacquie Lee	"I Put a Spell on You"	Public's vote

Non-competition performances
Order	Performer	Song
13.1	Flo Rida ft. Christina Aguilera	"How I Feel"
14.1	A Great Big World & Christina Aguilera	"Say Something"
15.1	Team Blake: Ray Boudreaux, Cole Vosbury, Austin Jenckes, Shelbie Z, Nic Hawk	"Free Ride"
15.2	Team CeeLo: Kat Robichaud, Caroline Pennell, Jonny Gray, Amber Nicole, Tamara Chauniece	"Give a Little Bit"
15.3	Team Christina: Matthew Schuler, Jacquie Lee, Josh Logan, Olivia Henken, Stephanie Anne Johnson	"Love Somebody"
15.4	Team Adam: James Wolpert, Will Champlin, Tessanne Chin, Preston Pohl & Grey	"Safe and Sound"

=== Week 2: Top 12 (Nov 11 & 12) ===
The Top 12 performed on Monday, November 11, 2013 and received the results on Tuesday, November 12, 2013.

This is the first week (of the four weeks until the quarterfinals) to introduce Instant Save. During the designated/announced five-minute voting window, Twitter users (with public accounts only) may vote to save one artist in each week's bottom three by tweeting the artist's voting keyword along with the show's designated hashtag. Viewers in the Eastern and Central time zones vote during the live broadcasts, while viewers in the Mountain and Pacific time zones are cued to vote to save artists on the show's official Twitter account during the live East coast broadcast.

iTunes bonus multipliers were awarded to Matthew Schuler (#2); However, it later reached #1 after the Top 12 Recap show that aired before the Top 12 Results show and it remained in the iTunes Top 200 chart throughout the remainder of the season.

Order	Coach	Artist	Song	Result
1	CeeLo Green	Caroline Pennell	"Wake Me Up"	Public's vote
2	Christina Aguilera	Josh Logan	"Man in the Mirror"	Eliminated
3	Adam Levine	James Wolpert	"Mr. Brightside"	Public's vote
4	Blake Shelton	Austin Jenckes	"It's a Great Day to Be Alive"	Public's vote
5	Christina Aguilera	Jacquie Lee	"Love Is Blindness"	Public's vote
6	Blake Shelton	Ray Boudreaux	"All of Me"	Public's vote
7	CeeLo Green	Kat Robichaud	"Sail"	Instant Save
8	CeeLo Green	Jonny Gray	"Another Day in Paradise"	Eliminated
9	Adam Levine	Tessanne Chin	"My Kind of Love"	Public's vote
10	Christina Aguilera	Matthew Schuler	"Hallelujah"	Public's vote
11	Blake Shelton	Cole Vosbury	"Adorn"	Public's vote
12	Adam Levine	Will Champlin	"Demons"	Public's vote

Non-competition performances
Order	Performers	Song
17.1	Sara Bareilles & the females of the Top 12	"Brave"
17.2	Cee Lo Green & his team (Caroline Pennell, Kat Robichaud & Jonny Gray)	"Roam"
17.3	The males of the Top 12	"We're an American Band"
17.4	Adam Levine & his team (Tessanne Chin, Will Champlin and James Wolpert)	"A Hard Day's Night"

=== Week 3: Top 10 (Nov 18 & 19) ===
The Top 10 performed on Monday, November 18, with results following on Tuesday, November 19. None of the artists reached the top 10 on iTunes, so no bonuses were awarded.

Order	Coach	Artist	Song	Result
1	Blake Shelton	Austin Jenckes	"Your Love"	Eliminated
2	Christina Aguilera	Jacquie Lee	"Clarity"	Public's vote
3	Adam Levine	Will Champlin	"Love Me Again"	Public's vote
4	CeeLo Green	Caroline Pennell	"Leaving on a Jet Plane"	Instant Save
5	Blake Shelton	Cole Vosbury	"To Be with You"	Public's vote
6	Adam Levine	Tessanne Chin	"If I Were Your Woman"	Public's vote
7	Blake Shelton	Ray Boudreaux	"You Are the Best Thing"	Public's vote
8	Adam Levine	James Wolpert	"Without You"	Public's vote
9	CeeLo Green	Kat Robichaud	"We Belong"	Eliminated
10	Christina Aguilera	Matthew Schuler	"Beneath Your Beautiful"	Public's vote

Non-competition performances
Order	Performers	Song
18.1	The Top 10	"Say It, Just Say It"
19.1	Christina Aguilera & her team (Matthew Schuler & Jacquie Lee)	Jackson Medley: "Black Cat", "Scream" & "Bad"
19.2	James Wolpert, Kat Robichaud, & Will Champlin	"Sugar, We're Going Down"
19.3	Blake Shelton & his team (Austin Jenckes, Cole Vosbury & Ray Boudreaux)	"Sharp Dressed Man"
19.4	Caroline Pennell & Tessanne Chin	"Royals"

=== Week 4: Top 8 (Nov 25 & 26) ===
The Top 8 performed on Monday, November 25, with results following on Tuesday, November 26.

Though all of the top eight artists charted within the iTunes top 100, the iTunes bonus multipliers was only awarded for Will Champlin (#8). With the elimination of Caroline Pennell, Green no longer has any artists on his team.

Order	Coach	Artist	Song	Result
1	Adam Levine	James Wolpert	"Somebody to Love"	Public's vote
2	Adam Levine	Tessanne Chin	"Underneath It All"	Public's vote
3	CeeLo Green	Caroline Pennell	"Dog Days Are Over"	Eliminated
4	Blake Shelton	Cole Vosbury	"I Still Believe in You"	Public's vote
5	Christina Aguilera	Matthew Schuler	"It's Time"	Instant Save
6	Adam Levine	Will Champlin	"At Last"	Public's vote
7	Blake Shelton	Ray Boudreaux	"Gimme Some Lovin'"	Eliminated
8	Christina Aguilera	Jacquie Lee	"Who's Lovin' You"	Public's vote

Non-competition performances
Order	Performers	Song
20.1	Robin Thicke	"Feel Good"
20.2	Cole Vosbury, Ray Boudreaux, Tessanne Chin & Will Champlin	"One Day"
20.3	Caroline Pennell, Jacquie Lee, James Wolpert, & Matthew Schuler	"Lego House"
21.1	Ellie Goulding with James Wolpert, Matthew Schuler & Will Champlin	"Burn"
21.2	The Top 8 with the Starbucks Chorus	"Will the Circle Be Unbroken?"
21.3	CeeLo Green ft. Goodie Mob	"Amy"
21.4	The Top 8	"Apologize" / "All the Right Moves"

=== Week 5: Quarterfinals (Dec 2 & 3) ===
The Top 6 performed two songs each, one chosen by their coach and one chosen by them dedicated to someone in their lives, on Monday, December 2, 2013 with the results following on Tuesday, December 3.

With the advancement of Wolpert, Levine became the first coach with all three contestants advancing to the Semifinals in The Voice history.

Coach	Artist	Order	Song (Coach's Choice)	Order	Song (Contestant's Choice as a Dedication)	Result
Blake Shelton	Cole Vosbury	1	"Rich Girl"	7	"Better Man"	Public's vote
Adam Levine	Tessanne Chin	2	"Redemption Song"	8	"Unconditionally"	Public's vote
Christina Aguilera	Matthew Schuler	9	"When a Man Loves a Woman"	3	"Story of My Life"	Eliminated
Adam Levine	Will Champlin	10	"Hey Brother"	4	"A Change Is Gonna Come"	Public's vote
Adam Levine	James Wolpert	12	"I'd Do Anything for Love (But I Won't Do That)"	5	"Fell in Love with a Girl"	Instant Save
Christina Aguilera	Jacquie Lee	6	"Cry Baby"	11	"The Voice Within"	Public's vote

Non-competition performances
Order	Performers	Song
23.1	Kelly Clarkson	"Underneath the Tree"
23.2	Jacquie Lee, Matthew Schuler, & Tessanne Chin	"You Got the Love"
23.3	Blake Shelton ft. Xenia	"Silver Bells"
23.4	Nuno Bettencourt with Cole Vosbury, James Wolpert & Will Champlin	"More Than Words"
23.5	The Top 6	"Joy to the World" / "O Holy Night"

=== Week 6: Semifinals (Dec 9 & 10) ===
The Top 5 performed on Monday, December 9, 2013 with the results following on Tuesday, December 10.

iTunes bonus multipliers was awarded to Tessanne Chin (#1), Jacquie Lee (#6), and Champlin (#10), with Chin becoming the first contestant to achieve the top chart position at the end of an applicable voting window this season. With the elimination of Cole Vosbury, Shelton no longer has any artists on his team, thus breaking his three-season winning streak, and also marked the first and only season in which Shelton does not have an artist representing him in the finale. In the results show, the top three finalists from Season 4 (Danielle Bradbery, Michelle Chamuel, and The Swon Brothers) made an appearance along with Season 3 winner Cassadee Pope.

Order	Coach	Artist	Song	Result
1	Adam Levine	James Wolpert	"With or Without You"	Eliminated
2	Adam Levine	Will Champlin	"Carry On"	Public's vote
3	Christina Aguilera	Jacquie Lee	"Angel"	Public's vote
4	Blake Shelton	Cole Vosbury	"Shameless"	Eliminated
5	Adam Levine	Tessanne Chin	"Bridge over Troubled Water"	Public's vote

Non-competition performances
Order	Performers	Song
24.1	The Top 5	"Best Day of My Life"
25.1	The Swon Brothers	"Later On"
25.2	Michelle Chamuel	"Go Down Singing"
25.3	Cassadee Pope	"I Wish I Could Break Your Heart"
25.4	Danielle Bradbery	"Never Like This"

=== Week 7: Finale (Dec 16 & 17) ===
The final performance show aired on Monday, December 16, 2013, with the winner declared on the following results show Tuesday, December 17. The final three artists performed a duet with their respective coaches, a solo song, and a reprisal song from Blind Auditions phase. While five songs reached the iTunes Top 10 (Tessanne Chin at #1 and #3, Jacquie Lee at #9, and Will Champlin at #8 and #10), no “iTunes Bonus” was implemented, and does not affect the outcome of the results.

Coach	Artist	Order	Reprise song	Order	Duet song (with coach)	Order	Solo song	Result
Adam Levine	Tessanne Chin	1	"Try"	4	"Let It Be"	7	"I Have Nothing"	Winner
Adam Levine	Will Champlin	2	"Not Over You"	6	"Tiny Dancer"	8	"(Everything I Do) I Do It For You"	Third Place
Christina Aguilera	Jacquie Lee	3	"Back to Black"	5	"We Remain"	9	"And I Am Telling You I'm Not Going"	Runner-Up

Non-competition performances
Order	Performers	Song
26.1	The Voice coaches & members of Def Leppard (Phil Collen, Rick Allen, and Vivian Campbell)	"Pour Some Sugar on Me"
26.2	The Top 3	"I'll Be There"
27.1	The Top 20	"Tonight Is The Night"
27.2	Jacquie Lee (with Caroline Pennell, Cole Vosbury, James Wolpert and Matthew Schuler)	"Bohemian Rhapsody"
27.3	Celine Dion and Tessanne Chin	"Love Can Move Mountains"
27.4	OneRepublic	"I Lived"
27.5	Matthew Schuler, Ray Boudreaux, Josh Logan, Preston Pohl and Nic Hawk	"Treasure"
27.6	Will Champlin (with Cole Vosbury, Caroline Pennell, Austin Jenckes and Jonny Gray)	"Wagon Wheel"
27.7	Paramore and Jacquie Lee	"Ain't It Fun"
27.8	Kat Robichaud, Tamara Chauniece, Amber Nicole, Grey, Stephanie Anne Johnson and Shelbie Z	"My Life Would Suck Without You"
27.9	Celine Dion and Ne-Yo	"Incredible"
27.10	Aloe Blacc and Will Champlin	"Wake Me Up"
27.11	Tessanne Chin (with Preston Pohl, James Wolpert, Olivia Henken and Grey)	"Hold On, I'm Comin'"
27.12	Lady Gaga and Christina Aguilera	"Do What U Want"
27.13	Tessanne Chin (Winner)	"Tumblin' Down"

== Elimination chart ==
=== Overall ===
Color key
Artist's info

- Team Adam
- Team CeeLo
- Team Christina
- Team Blake

Result details

- Winner
- Runner-up
- Third place
- Artist was saved by his/her coach
- Saved by Instant Save (via Twitter)
- Artist was saved by the public
- Artist was eliminated

Live show results per week
Artist	Week 1 Playoffs	Week 2	Week 3	Week 4	Week 5	Week 6	Week 7 Finale
Tessanne Chin	Safe	Safe	Safe	Safe	Safe	Safe	Winner
Jacquie Lee	Safe	Safe	Safe	Safe	Safe	Safe	Runner-up
Will Champlin	Safe	Safe	Safe	Safe	Safe	Safe	3rd place
Cole Vosbury	Safe	Safe	Safe	Safe	Safe	Eliminated	Eliminated (Week 6)
James Wolpert	Safe	Safe	Safe	Safe	Safe	Eliminated	Eliminated (Week 6)
Matthew Schuler	Safe	Safe	Safe	Safe	Eliminated	Eliminated (Week 5)	
Ray Boudreaux	Safe	Safe	Safe	Eliminated	Eliminated (Week 4)		
Caroline Pennell	Safe	Safe	Safe	Eliminated	Eliminated (Week 4)		
Austin Jenckes	Safe	Safe	Eliminated	Eliminated (Week 3)			
Kat Robichaud	Safe	Safe	Eliminated	Eliminated (Week 3)			
Josh Logan	Safe	Eliminated	Eliminated (Week 2)				
Jonny Gray	Safe	Eliminated	Eliminated (Week 2)				
Tamara Chauniece	Eliminated	Eliminated (Week 1)					
Grey	Eliminated	Eliminated (Week 1)					
Nic Hawk	Eliminated	Eliminated (Week 1)					
Olivia Henken	Eliminated	Eliminated (Week 1)					
Stephanie Anne Johnson	Eliminated	Eliminated (Week 1)					
Amber Nicole	Eliminated	Eliminated (Week 1)					
Preston Pohl	Eliminated	Eliminated (Week 1)					
Shelbie Z.	Eliminated	Eliminated (Week 1)					

=== Team ===
Color key
Artist's info

- Team Adam
- Team CeeLo
- Team Christina
- Team Blake

Result details

- Winner
- Runner-up
- Third place
- Eliminated
- Artist Saved by Instant Save (via Twitter)
- Artist received one or more iTunes bonus that week (applicable from Week 1 onwards)
- Number of iTunes bonuses received
- Teams are in 3 artists
- No artists remaining on his/her team

Artist	Week 1 Playoffs	Week 2	Week 3	Week 4	Week 5	Week 6	Week 7 Finale
Tessanne Chin	Public's vote	Advanced	Advanced	Advanced	Advanced	Advanced	Winner
Will Champlin	Coach's choice	Advanced	Advanced	Advanced	Advanced	Advanced	Third Place
James Wolpert	Public's vote	Advanced	Advanced	Advanced	Advanced	Eliminated	
Grey	Eliminated						
Preston Pohl	Eliminated						
Caroline Pennell	Public's vote	Advanced	Advanced	Eliminated			
Kat Robichaud	Coach's choice	Advanced	Eliminated				
Jonny Gray	Public's vote	Eliminated					
Tamara Chauniece	Eliminated						
Amber Nicole	Eliminated						
Jacquie Lee	Public's vote	Advanced	Advanced	Advanced	Advanced	Advanced	Runner-Up
Matthew Schuler	Public's vote	Advanced	Advanced	Advanced	Eliminated		
Josh Logan	Coach's choice	Eliminated					
Olivia Henken	Eliminated						
Stephanie Anne Johnson	Eliminated						
Cole Vosbury	Public's vote	Advanced	Advanced	Advanced	Advanced	Eliminated	
Ray Boudreaux	Coach's choice	Advanced	Advanced	Eliminated			
Austin Jenckes	Public's vote	Advanced	Eliminated				
Nic Hawk	Eliminated						
Shelbie Z.	Eliminated						

Rank	Coach	Top 12	Top 10	Top 8	Top 6	Top 5	Top 3
1	Adam Levine	3	3	3	3	3	2
2	Christina Aguilera	3	2	2	2	1	1
3	Blake Shelton	3	3	2	1	1	0
4	CeeLo Green	3	2	1	0	0	0

== Performances by guests/coaches ==
Episode	Show segment	Performer(s)	Title	Reaction		Performance type
Episode	Show segment	Performer(s)	Title	Hot 100	Hot digital	Performance type
6	The Best of the Blind Auditions	Danielle Bradbery	"The Heart of Dixie"	Did not chart	Did not chart	Pre-recorded
6	The Best of the Blind Auditions	Cassadee Pope	"Wasting All These Tears"	58 (+17)	41 (+5)	Music video clip
13	The Live Playoffs	Flo Rida ft. Christina Aguilera	"How I Feel"	114 (=)	70 (-8)	Live performance
14	The Live Playoffs	A Great Big World & Christina Aguilera	"Say Something"	16 (debut)	1 (debut)	Live performance
17	Top 12 Results	Sara Bareilles (with Tessanne Chin, Caroline Pennell, Jacquie Lee and Kat Robichaud)	"Brave"	27 (+10)	21 (+26)	Live performance
20	Top 8 Performs	Robin Thicke	"Feel Good"	Did not chart	Did not chart	Live performance
21	Top 8 Results	Ellie Goulding (with James Wolpert, Matthew Schuler and Will Champlin)	"Burn"	21 (+15)	13 (+14)	Live performance
23	Quarterfinals Results	Kelly Clarkson	"Underneath the Tree"	92 (debut)	TBA	Live performance
23	Quarterfinals Results	Blake Shelton ft. Xenia	"Silver Bells"	Did not chart	Did not chart	Live performance
25	Semifinals Results	The Swon Brothers	"Later On"	Did not chart	Did not chart	Live performance
25	Semifinals Results	Michelle Chamuel	"Go Down Singing"	Did not chart	TBA	Live performance
25	Semifinals Results	Cassadee Pope	"I Wish I Could Break Your Heart"	Did not chart	TBA	Live performance
25	Semifinals Results	Danielle Bradbery	"Never Like This"	Did not chart	TBA	Live performance
25	Semifinals Results	Danielle Bradbery	"My Day"	Did not chart	Did not chart	Pre-recorded
27	Final Results	Celine Dion and Ne-Yo	"Incredible"	Did not chart	TBA	Live performance
27	Final Results	Lady Gaga and Christina Aguilera	"Do What U Want"	16 (+2)	TBA	Live performance
27	Final Results	OneRepublic	"I Lived"	Did not chart	TBA	Live performance
27	Final Results	Paramore (with Jacquie Lee)	"Ain't It Fun"	Did not chart	TBA	Live performance

== Ratings ==
The fifth season premiered on September 23, 2013 and was watched by 14.98 million viewers with a 5.1 rating in the 18–49 demographic. It was up from last season's premiere by 1.34 million viewers.

Episode		Original airdate	Production	Timeslot (ET)	Viewers (in millions)	Adults (18–49)		Source
Episode		Original airdate	Production	Timeslot (ET)	Viewers (in millions)	Rating	Share	Source
1	"The Blind Auditions Premiere, Part 1"	September 23, 2013	501	Monday 8:00 p.m.	14.98	5.1	13	
2	"The Blind Auditions Premiere, Part 2"	September 24, 2013	502	Tuesday 8:00 p.m.	14.35	4.7	13	
3	"The Blind Auditions, Part 3"	September 30, 2013	503	Monday 8:00 p.m.	14.12	4.7	13	
4	"The Blind Auditions, Part 4"	October 1, 2013	504	Tuesday 8:00 p.m.	14.54	4.5	13	
5	"The Blind Auditions, Part 5"	October 7, 2013	505	Monday 8:00 p.m.	14.63	4.6	13	
6	"The Best of the Blind Auditions"	October 8, 2013	506	Tuesday 8:00 p.m.	10.20	3.0	9	
7	"The Battles Premiere, Part 1"	October 14, 2013	507	Monday 8:00 p.m.	13.87	4.5	12	
8	"The Battles Premiere, Part 2"	October 15, 2013	508	Tuesday 9:00 p.m.	12.99	4.0	11	
9	"The Battles, Part 3"	October 21, 2013	509	Monday 8:00 p.m.	13.69	4.3	11	
10	"The Battles, Part 4"	October 22, 2013	510	Tuesday 9:00 p.m.	13.14	4.1	11	
11	"The Knockouts Premiere, Part 1"	October 28, 2013	511	Monday 8:00 p.m.	13.22	4.3	11	
12	"The Knockout, Part 2"	October 29, 2013	512	Tuesday 9:00 p.m.	11.62	3.6	10	
13	"Live Playoffs, Part 1"	November 4, 2013	513	Monday 8:00 p.m.	11.75	3.6	9	
14	"Live Playoffs, Part 2"	November 5, 2013	514	Tuesday 9:00 p.m.	11.30	3.4	9	
15	"Live Playoffs, Results"	November 7, 2013	515	Thursday 8:00 p.m.	9.74	2.5	8	
16	"Live Top 12 Performance"	November 11, 2013	516	Monday 8:00 p.m.	11.99	3.8	10	
17	"Live Top 12 Results"	November 12, 2013	517	Tuesday 9:00 p.m.	11.64	3.4	9	
18	"Live Top 10 Performance"	November 18, 2013	518	Monday 9:00 p.m.	10.54	3.5	9	
19	"Live Top 10 Results"	November 19, 2013	519	Tuesday 9:00 p.m.	11.65	3.2	8	
20	"Live Top 8 Performance"	November 25, 2013	520	Monday 8:00 p.m.	11.52	3.4	9	
21	"Live Top 8 Results"	November 26, 2013	521	Tuesday 9:00 p.m.	10.35	3.0	8	
22	"Live Top 6 Performance"	December 2, 2013	522	Monday 8:00 p.m.	12.03	3.4	9	
23	"Live Top 6 Results"	December 3, 2013	523	Tuesday 9:00 p.m.	12.14	3.4	9	
24	"Live Top 5 Semifinals Performance"	December 9, 2013	524	Monday 8:00 p.m.	13.20	3.5	10	
25	"Live Top 5 Semi-finals Results"	December 10, 2013	525	Tuesday 9:00 p.m.	11.52	3.1	9	
26	"Live Finale Performance"	December 16, 2013	526	Monday 8:00 p.m.	12.68	3.3	9	
27	"Live Finale Results"	December 17, 2013	527	Tuesday 9:00 p.m.	14.01	4.0	11	

== Artists' appearances in other media ==
- James Irwin and Matt Cermanski sang in the blind auditions for season four, but failed to turn any chairs. Coincidentally, they were paired against each other in the battles, with Adam Levine picking the former.
- James Wolpert was among the Top 5 finalists in ABC's High School Musical: Get in the Picture.
- Shelbie Z later made the Top 24 on the fifteenth season of American Idol and was eliminated in the Semifinals.
- Jacquie Lee later appeared as a contestant on the 24th season of American Idol. However, her appearance was absent during the 'Ohana Round' episode, stating that she was eliminated in the series.
- Josh Logan would later go on Season 1 of Songland.
- Manuel Romero, who failed to turn a chair, was on season 2 of America's Got Talent and was eliminated in the Semifinals.
