= Josh Logan (rock singer) =

American singer-songwriter (born 1980)

- Born: Josh Logan; March 29, 1980 (age 46); Manchester, New Hampshire, US
- Origin: Manchester, New Hampshire, US
- Genres: Rock, blue-eyed soul
- Instruments: Vocals, guitar
- Website: www.joshloganonline.com

Josh Logan (born 1980), born Josh Corder, is a singer-songwriter, vocalist and guitarist best known for his performances on the television shows Rock Star: Supernova and The Voice. He is influenced by a wide scope of artists ranging between Stevie Wonder, Pearl Jam, Layne Staley (of Alice in Chains), G. Love & Special Sauce, Jimi Hendrix, Faith No More, John Lennon and Red Hot Chili Peppers.

== Biography ==
At a very early age, Logan traveled with his mother, a DJ, and often performed karaoke with her.

By the age of 15, Logan was on-stage as the front man for the local New England rock band Gunshy. The band released one album in 1996, but broke up when Logan was 18. After the breakup, Logan played at local venues for two years as a solo artist, hosting open mic nights as well as performing, to hone his skills as a solo musician.

In the early 2000s, he formed the three-piece band Josh Logan & Nobody's Business with hired musicians. Within a few years, he had earned the title "hardest working musician in Manchester" from the local newspaper Hippo Press Logan was also one of 100 semi-finalists in the Disc Makers "Independent Northeast Songwriting Competition". In December 2004, the band released a self-titled full length CD. Its first single "Painful Breath" was aired on the New Hampshire Clear Channel rock radio stations WGIR ("Rock 101") and WHEB.

In 2006, Logan was one of the top 15 finalists of 25,000 entrants on the CBS TV reality show Rock Star: Supernova featuring Tommy Lee, Jason Newsted, Gilby Clark, Dave Navarro, and Brooke Burke. He was eliminated on August 9 along with Jill Gioia.

In 2007, Logan formed The Josh Logan Band, which is composed of Logan on vocals and rhythm guitar, Nate Comp on lead guitar, Matt Reignkin on bass, and Ryan Barrett on drums. The band released the album Gone Tomorrow, Here Today in 2012. Tommy Lee of Mötley Crüe and Lisa Guyer of Sully Erna's solo project are each featured on one of the album's songs. That year, Hippo Press named him "Best Local Performer Playing Original Songs" in its 8th annual Reader's Poll. The band has shared the stage with Dimebag Darrell and Vinnie Paul (of Damageplan and Pantera), Tantric, Shinedown, Lacuna Coil, James Montgomery, Toby Lightman, De Sol, Josh Gracin and many others.

== The Voice ==
In 2013, he competed in Season 5 of NBC's singing competition, The Voice. On the inaugural day of the season, broadcast on September 23, 2013, he performed Alex Clare's song "Too Close." Adam Levine, Christina Aguilera, and Blake Shelton turned their chairs but he opted to join Christina Aguilera. He finished the season in 11th place.

– Studio version of performance reached the top 10 on iTunes

Stage	Song	Original Artist	Date	Order	Result
Blind Audition	"Too Close"	Alex Clare	September 23, 2013	1.12	Adam Levine, Christina Aguilera, and Blake Shelton turned Joined Team Christina
Battle Rounds	"Harder to Breathe" (vs. Michael Lynch)	Maroon 5	October 21, 2013	9.1	Saved by Coach
Knockout Rounds	"Living for the City" (vs. Amber Nicole)	Stevie Wonder	October 28, 2013	11.1	Saved by Coach
Live Playoffs	"Crazy"	Gnarls Barkley	November 5, 2013	14.6	Saved by Coach
Live Top 12	"Man in the Mirror"	Michael Jackson	November 11, 2013	16.2	Eliminated

== Discography ==
=== with Gunshy ===
- Silicone (1996)

=== as Josh Logan and Nobody's Business ===
- Josh Logan And Nobody's Business (2004)

=== as Josh Logan ===
- Gone Tomorrow, Here Today (2012)
