= Everything Reminds Me of You =

Single by Tessanne Chin

from the album Count on My Love
- Released: 13 May 2014
- Recorded: Circle House Studios, Miami
- Genre: Pop, Reggae Fusion
- Length: 3:52
- Label: Universal Records, Republic Records
- Songwriters: Timothy Thomas, Theron Thomas, Tessanne Chin
- Producer: Supa Dups

Tessanne Chin singles chronology
"Tumbling Down" (2013)	"Everything Reminds Me of You" (2014)

"Everything Reminds Me of You" is a song by the Commodores. It was originally released in 1993 and later covered by the Jamaican recording artist Tessanne Chin, which she released as the second single from her major label debut album Count on My Love. It was written by Rock City aka Planet VI and co-written by Tessanne while produced by Grammy Award-winning producer Supa Dups. Although it is the second single from the album behind "Tumbling Down", it serves as the album's lead single.

== Promotion ==
The song was debuted during the Season 6 semifinal round of The Voice with a live performance.

== Release history ==
Region	Date	Label	Format
United States	May 13, 2014	Republic Records	Digital
