= In Between Words =

Studio album by Tessanne Chin
- Released: December 26, 2010
- Recorded: Kingston, Jamaica
- Genre: Reggae
- Length: 60:11
- Producer: Tessanne Chin, Rudy Valentino, Paul Kastic

Tessanne Chin chronology
In Between Words (2010)	Count on My Love (2014)

Singles from In Between Words
- 1. "Hideaway" Released: June 10, 2006; 2. "Black Books" Released: January 18, 2007; 3. "Messenger" Released: May 26, 2008

In Between Words is the independent debut album by Jamaican singer-songwriter Tessanne Chin released digitally on December 6, 2010. After going on tour for three years with Jimmy Cliff as a back-up singer, Tessanne decided to launch her solo career. she began writing songs for her the album after she left her band Mile High.

The first single "Hideaway" received heavy rotation on Jamaican radio and select stations in New York City. According to Nielsen SoundScan, it has sold over 15,749 downloads in its first week of release. The song was also featured on VP Records' Reggae Gold 2007. After "Hideaway," she has released two more singles, "Black Books," and "Messenger" both which were made available digitally.

== Background and development ==
Chin stated the album was made at late stages because she is "a perfectionist in a kind of crazy way". Chin said songs that stuck out to her were "Who" because of its dub-style reggae feel, "Flying High", "Taken" and "You and Me", the duet with her sister Tami Chynn.

"Hideaway" has been described as a soulful reggae ballad is all about love. Which she is trying to convey her feelings to a guy she's fallen for. She's offering her heart as a secret hideaway from all his troubles, and to receive all the love he's only dreamed of. Absolutely beautiful words. The Lead single "Black Books" has been described as an empowering song many women can relate to, about a man who doesn't appreciate your worth until the relationship is over. Tessanne sings about being alone and mistreated by the man she loves, while he runs around playing games. While Messenger is a song that makes you think about what's going on in society today. Tessanne is known not only for her poetical love songs, but also for conscious and thought-provoking lyrics

Chin said that the decision to release the album exclusively digital, was to capitalize on her music reaching fans all around the world. Chin also described her debut album as an infusion of rock, reggae and soul.

== Critical reception ==
Professional ratings
Review scores
Source	Rating
Embrace You Magazine	5/5 stars

Kai of Embrace You magazine wrote, "There are two songs that I had hoped would've made it to the album: "Running" and "No Matter How". It's unfortunate they didn't make the final cut, but regardless the album is still fanastic. Tessanne Chin did an exceptional job for her first album. The lyrics are deep and the songs are soulful; whether they're slow reggae ballads or fast-paced rock jams, she delivers without a pinch of error. A flawless record demanding a place within your music collection."

Ahmad Tafari of The Reggae Vibe wrote that the album was "Reggae, Rock and Soul all put together beautifully in between words."

== Track listing ==
All songs written by Tessanne Chin.

No.	Title	Length
1.	"Black Books"	3:10
2.	"Hideaway"	5:00
3.	"Loving you ft. Kees Dieffenthaller"	4:25
4.	"Flying High"	4:21
5.	"Messenger"	3:36
6.	"The Fall"	4:08
7.	"Are Yah Gonna (Control)"	3:49
8.	"Blue Lights (S.O.S)"	4:06
9.	"Who"	5:22
10.	"Guilty by Design"	4:26
11.	"Family"	4:27
12.	"The Right one"	4:23
13.	"You and Me"	5:29
14.	"Taken"	3:52
Total length:		60:11
