= Fire (Tessanne Chin song) =

Single by Tessanne Chin
- Released: May 5, 2015
- Recorded: 2015
- Genre: R&B, soul, pop
- Length: 4:23
- Label: Justice League Music Group
- Songwriter(s): Tessanne Chin, Balewa Muhammad, Perry Mapp
- Producer(s): J.U.S.T.I.C.E. League

"Fire" is a single released by Jamaican recording artist Tessanne Chin under Justice League Music on May 5, 2015. "Fire" is Chin's first single released under Justice League Music.

== Background and release ==
On April 30, 2015, Tessanne shared on her Facebook page that she would be releasing the background song which was featured in her clear scalp and hair commercial. It was co-written by Balewa Muhammad and produced by J.U.S.T.I.C.E. League. She described the song as "A soulful power anthem and a reminder to never sell yourself short."

Billboard described the song as a 1970s with her throwback track, a classic-sounding R&B tune that showcases her undeniable voice.

== Recording ==
In an interview with Billboard, Chin stated "The whole experience of creating and writing this song was just so organic and real". Chin continues, "It took me back to the music and an era that I absolutely love and respect." She also stated her favorite parts of writing and recording "Fire". "We were all in a live room clapping and stomping our heels around a mic to the beat to add that extra bit of realness to it," she says. "It was so much fun."

== Critical reception ==
Professional ratings
Review scores
Source	Rating
SoulTrain	4/5 stars

The song has been highly praised for its 1970s feel and lyrical content. The Source stated: The Voice winner has been laying low [sic] since the ending of season 5, but absolutely blows fans away with the unexpected “Fire”. Her irrefutable talent truly shines through on the song as she belts out the lyrics “Shame on me because my eyes were closed, and you gon’ have to live with the life you chose but that's alright I suppose. I burned all your clothes, yes I did. Ya playin with fire!”. We guarentee [sic] you’ll be singing this tune all day.

Ken Hamm of SoulBounce stated “Fire” sounds as if it was created back in 1956, and that's not a bad thing. While the requisite woman saying “Justice League” feels a bit out of place, we knew the sound of this joint was going to be on point. With “Fire,” Tessanne is trying to claim her diva crown, taking names with each sassy lyric. We're happy to see that the Jamaican-born star hasn't faded quietly like many reality show musicians and is pushing forward with her career. If there's anything negative, we'd say that Tessanne could have started a little softer and built up to the full force of that amazing voice of hers. Otherwise, we foresee “Fire” getting a lot of burn on Top 40 radio and around SBHQ.
