= Matthew Schuler =

American singer (born 1992)

- Born: November 20, 1992 (age 33)
- Genres: Indie rock; Alternative rock
- Occupation: Singer
- Instrument: Vocals Guitar
- Years active: 2013–present

Matthew Schuler (born 1992) is an American singer from Yardley, Pennsylvania. He came to national attention as a contestant on Season Five of The Voice.

Schuler grew up in Yardley, Pennsylvania and sang in a church community with his parents, who are both pastors. Schuler played in a rock band called Threshold as a high schooler, but quit the group in 2010 and entered West Chester University in 2011. In 2013 he auditioned for The Voice and was chosen by all four coaches on the show for potential collaboration, ultimately choosing Christina Aguilera as his coach. His rendition of Leonard Cohen's "Hallelujah" was successful as a single, reaching No. 40 on the Billboard Hot 100 in the United States and No. 38 on the Canadian Hot 100.

He is one of The Voice alumni to debut The Voice: Neon Dreams, a live concert project organized by the American The Voice. It will be held at the Hard Rock Hotel & Casino in Las Vegas.

== Career ==
=== 2013: The Voice ===
– Studio version of performance reached the top 10 on iTunes

Stage	Song	Original Artist	Date	Order	Result
Blind Audition	"Cough Syrup"	Young the Giant	September 23, 2013	1.5	All Four Chairs turned Joined Team Christina
Battle Rounds	"My Songs Know What You Did in the Dark (Light Em Up)" (vs. Jacob Poole)	Fall Out Boy	October 15, 2013	8.1	Saved by Coach
Knockout Rounds	"Cosmic Love" (vs. Will Champlin)	Florence and the Machine	October 29, 2013	12.8	Saved by Coach
Live Playoffs	"Wrecking Ball"	Miley Cyrus	November 5, 2013	14.9	Saved by Public Vote
Live Top 12	"Hallelujah"	Leonard Cohen	November 11, 2013	16.10	Saved by Public Vote
Live Top 10	"Beneath Your Beautiful"	Labrinth feat. Emeli Sandé	November 18, 2013	18.10	Saved by Public Vote
Live Top 8	"It's Time"	Imagine Dragons	November 25, 2013	20.5	Bottom 3 Instant saved
Live Top 6	"Story of My Life"	One Direction	December 2, 2013	22.3	Eliminated
Live Top 6	"When a Man Loves a Woman"	Percy Sledge	December 2, 2013	22.9	Eliminated

Matthew released his first single "Invincible" on July 11, 2015.
