= Holly Henry =

American singer (born 1994)

- Born: Holly Mae Heinrich; March 31, 1994 (age 32); Hennepin, Minnesota, U.S.
- Genres: Alternative; indie pop
- Occupations: Singer, songwriter
- Instruments: Guitar, ukulele, banjo, piano, organ, vocals
- Years active: 2011–present
- Label: Garden Ghost Records
- Website: hollyhenrymusic.com

Holly Mae Heinrich (born March 31, 1994), known professionally as Holly Henry, is an American singer-songwriter from Minnesota. She took her stage name when competing in 2013 on the fifth season of The Voice (United States edition). She subsequently built an international fan base through her YouTube channel and original music releases.

== Early life and education ==
Henry is the daughter of Marc Heinrich, a musician, and Becky Heinrich, an art teacher and graphic artist. She attended public schools in the Minneapolis area and graduated from Hopkins High School. While in high school, Henry sang in a sandwich shop gig and posted covers of songs on her YouTube channel, which she began in 2011. Her most popular video is an a cappella cover of Eurythmics' "Sweet Dreams (Are Made of This)" with three-part vocal harmonies.

== Career ==
While taking a gap year before college, Henry's parents encouraged her to audition for The Voice at a Chicago, Illinois audition in January 2013. Henry advanced through the open call and subsequent executive auditions and participated in a boot camp during the summer of 2013. Her Blind Audition performance of The Scientist got all four chairs to turn. The studio performance release by the show charted on Billboard and the live performance video was in the all-time Top 40 for views of The Voice performances on YouTube, until its removal by NBC. In the Battle Rounds, she competed against Cilla Chan, singing Torn. Henry and Chan were montaged (their vocal performances were not shown in full) and Henry was chosen to move on. In the Knockout Round, Henry competed against Nic Hawk, singing Creep by Radiohead. She was sent home, and NBC's The Voice (US) subsequently lost 15% (1.5 million) viewers after that episode. Two years after her appearance on The Voice, Henry's popularity on YouTube had increased 10-fold.

Henry released her first EP called The Immigrant in 2013. The 5 track EP peaked on iTunes at #6 on both the US Pop and Rock Charts, the same position it attained in pre-release. On April 7, 2014, Henry took second place (to Shawn Mendes) in the RyanSeacrest.com top cover competition for her rendition of the hit song Say Something. Third place finisher Jamison Murphy later featured Henry on his single "Remember When". On May 6, 2014, the Grow Music Project released Session Diaries #4, a video on the Christopher Tyng-led production of Henry's single "Hide and Seek", which was released simultaneously on iTunes. "Hide and Seek" is the soundtrack for the closing credits of the short film Escapement, written and produced by Erik A. Candiani. Henry collaborated with Candiani on the KARE11 (Minneapolis TV station) promo for the Sochi Winter Olympics, which was subsequently nominated for two Upper Midwestern Emmy awards, with a win for best Musical Arrangement/Composition. Henry's original song In the Air was commissioned for the 2016 film Intersection: the Story of Josh Grant.

Henry's live performances began immediately after her Blind Audition on The Voice. They have included a Minnesota Music Coalition benefit at the Varsity Theater on February 20, 2014, and the Winter's Over Music Festival on April 25, 2015. YouTube produced a video of her single Katie at their YouTube Space in New York, which Henry released on January 19, 2015. Her Indiegogo-funded second EP, The Orchard, was released on August 21, 2015. Henry collaborated with Moonhead Industries to release a music video for Better, a single from the EP.

An 11-track album titled King Paten was released on July 1, 2016. It had worldwide sales, charting on iTunes in Russia, South Africa, the UK, Cyprus, Israel, France, Canada and the US. On September 2, 2016, she confirmed to writing a new album. On November 17, 2018, Holly released a song called "Float" under the name "Mooney". Again billed as Mooney, she released her self-produced album "softer" on October 25, 2019.

== Reviews ==
Jonathan Frahm reviewed The Immigrant EP and wrote that Henry "displays the beyond-her-years nuance and musicality...delivering what is surely one of the most magnificent releases by a Voice contestant yet." Frahm followed up with a review of "Hide and Seek" in which he wrote about Henry's songwriting: "She’s writing for all to hear, sure, but each song that Holly writes is its own little world in which she is the only initial representative of its populous. It shows, too, in “Hide and Seek”, as she thoughtfully, mournfully weaves a new tale with regards to a wispy nostalgic quality which she so greatly inhabits. “Hide and Seek” may be one of her more instantly relatable works, as well, given how listeners could easily relate the song's lyricism to a past hefty romantic issue of their own."

FDRMX writer John Mychal Feraren reviewed Henry's single "Grow". He said that "the real standout in the song is the impeccable songwriting skills of Holly. She was able to establish such lyrical depth in 'Grow' that fully matches her naturally silky tone."

Music Historian blogger Patricia Trutescu interviewed Henry and wrote after the release of "Hide and Seek": "the most intriguing quality about this developing artist is that while she returns with a voice we are all familiar with, we now have the opportunity to enjoy something more refreshing – beautiful and youthful voice that expresses an old soul." Music Historian guest blogger Gary Reese wrote after the release of "The Orchard EP that it "successfully plays to audiences attracted to Holly's angelic voice and allegorical lyrics. The EP represents a sophisticated evolution of Holly's musical talent, combined with a remarkable collaborative achievement by producer and backup instrumentalist Matt Patrick." Reese reviewed King Paten in For Folk's Sake and wrote: "The eleven tracks of ‘King Paten’ spotlight Holly's rapidly maturing vocal talent, with stylistic influences clearly gained in covering over 100 unique artists on her internationally popular YouTube and SoundCloud channels. Lyrically, she coaxes us to hear how she felt in her youth, thus introducing fans to her pre-‘The Voice’ youthful innocence. It's a musical journey well worth exploring."

Ear to the Ground music reviewer Kori Rae Shearer wrote about The Orchard EP that Henry "has the type of tone and control that can gently interrupt conversation as heads turn her way. The understated use of her voice and subtle backing vocals are extremely effective. Holly is very skilled in the art of accentuating her message with her vocals, which speaks volumes of the control and talent she brings to the table."

== Discography ==
=== Albums ===
Title	Details	Track list
King Paten	Released: July 1, 2016; Label: Garden Ghost	11 tracks: 1. Powder Blue Earth; 2. Citrus; 3. Crawl; 4. In Between; 5. White Knuckles; 6. Intermission; 7. Warrior; 8. Coriander / Chamomile; 9. Joan of Arc; 10. Roswell; 11. King Paten
softer (as Mooney)	Released: October 25, 2019; Label: Garden Ghost	9 tracks: 1. hunny; 2. another phone; 3. softer; 4. phantom feeling; 5. stargate; 6. nzo; 7. fleur; 8. straps; 9. melatonin

=== Extended plays ===
Title	Details	Track list
The Immigrant	Released: December 16, 2013; Label: Garden Ghost	5 tracks: 1. Paper Clips; 2. Sink; 3. The Immigrant; 4. The Ghost; 5. To Drift
The Orchard	Released: August 21, 2015; Label: Garden Ghost	6 tracks: 1. Arbor; 2. Hotel; 3. The Orchard; 4. Skin; 5. Foolish Heart; 6. Better

=== Singles ===
- "Katie" (2013)
- "Secrets Spoken" (2013)
- "More Than Nothing" (2013)
- "Paper Love" (2013)
- "Hide and Seek" (2014)
- "Grow" (2014)
- "Float" (2018)

=== Releases from The Voice ===
- "The Scientist"
- "Torn"
