= How I Feel (Flo Rida song) =

Single by Flo Rida
- Released: October 28, 2013
- Recorded: 2013
- Length: 2:49
- Label: Atlantic, Poe Boy
- Songwriters: Tramar Dillard, (sample Anthony Newley, Leslie Bricusse)
- Producers: Sermstyle, DJ Frank E

Flo Rida singles chronology
"Can't Believe It" (2013)	"How I Feel" (2013)	"G.D.F.R." (2014)

Music video
- "How I Feel" on YouTube

"How I Feel" is a song by American rapper Flo Rida. It samples the song "Feeling Good" by Nina Simone. The song peaked at number twenty-six on the ARIA and number fifty-five on the Canadian Hot 100.

Flo Rida performed the song on the 13 episode of fifth season of The Voice with judge Christina Aguilera singing the chorus. This is the official theme song of the 27th Annual WWE Survivor Series The song was also used to promote the 13th season of American Idol.

== Music video ==
Directed by Shane Drake, the video features Flo Rida and his friends (dressed in Rat Pack-inspired wardrobe) going to Planet Hollywood Resort & Casino in Las Vegas. At some points, the action freezes and the camera zooms in on the action that happens in tableau. The video was uploaded on YouTube on November 14, 2013.

== Track listing ==
- Digital download
1. "How I Feel" – 2:49

== Remixes ==
- Digital Downloads
1. "How I Feel" (SICK INDIVIDUALS Remix) – 3:24
2. "How I Feel" (SCNDL Remix) – 3:20
3. "How I Feel" (Special Future Remix) – 5:42
4. "How I Feel" (Wolfpack Remix) – 5:24
5. "How I Feel" (Twenty1 Remix) – 3:21
6. "How I Feel" (Bang La Decks Remix) – 5:00

== Charts ==
Weekly chart performance
Chart (2013–14)	Peak position
Australia (ARIA)	20
Austria (Ö3 Austria Top 40)	11
Belgium (Ultratip Bubbling Under Flanders)	48
Belgium (Ultratip Bubbling Under Wallonia)	13
Canada Hot 100 (Billboard)	55
Finland Airplay (Radiosoittolista)	14
Finland Download (Latauslista)	24
Germany (GfK)	24
Hungary (Editors' Choice Top 40)	17
Ireland (IRMA)	31
Poland Dance (ZPAV)	46
Scotland Singles (Official Charts)	4
Switzerland (Schweizer Hitparade)	24
UK Hip Hop/R&B (Official Charts)	1
UK Singles (Official Charts)	8
US Billboard Hot 100	96
US Hot Rap Songs (Billboard)	12
US Dance Club Songs (Billboard)	49
US Pop Airplay (Billboard)	25

== Certifications ==
Certifications and sales
Region	Certification	Certified units/sales
Australia (ARIA)	Gold	35,000^{^}
^{^} Shipments figures based on certification alone.

== Release history ==
Street dates
Country	Release date	Format(s)	Label
United States	October 28, 2013	Digital download	Atlantic Records, Poe Boy Entertainment
