= Hideaway (Tessanne Chin song) =

Single by Tessanne Chin

from the album In Between Words
- Released: 2006
- Recorded: 2006
- Genre: Reggae, reggae fusion
- Length: 5:01
- Songwriter: Tessanne Chin
- Producers: Tessanne Chin, Rudy Valentino, Paul Kastick

"Hideaway" is the debut single released by Jamaican recording artist Tessanne Chin and is featured on her independently released debut album titled "In Between Words." The song was written by herself and produced by her in-house producers Rudy Valentino and Paul Kastick. "Hideaway" received heavy rotation on Jamaican radio, Europe and select stations in New York. According to Nielsen SoundScan, it has sold over 15,749 downloads. The song was also featured on VP Records' Reggae Gold 2007.

== Composition ==
"Hideaway is a soulful reggae ballad is all about love. Chin is tries to convey her feelings to a guy she’s fallen for. She’s offering her heart as a secret hideaway from all his troubles, and to receive all the love he’s only dreamed of. Absolutely beautiful words.

== Music video ==
=== Concept and background ===
The music video for "Hideaway" was directed by Delano Forbes. The music video was shot in Kingston, Jamaica and was released in early 2007.

=== Synopsis ===
The video begins with Chin walking towards a guy who portrays her lover within the music video. As the main section of the song begins, Cameras zoom in on Chin as she waves her hand lying down wearing a burgundy, Purple and pink type dress and began singing the first verse of the song. The second scene featured Chin at home being in the company of her sister Tami Chynn, two men with guitars and her lover amongst others in the process of music writing. The next scene then showed Tessanne being in a studio recording a song as her lover produces the song. She then proceeded being in an open area where she continues singing. They then focused backed to the studio where the video reached the bridge of the song where there was tremor within the studio and also sees Chin wearing a Black and pink top and a black jeans. They then took in back to the main event where she's standing and closed it off at her singing with a mic in her.

== Charts ==
Chart (2026)	Peak position
Jamaica Airplay (JAMMS)	2
