= James Wolpert =

- Born: December 26, 1990 (age 35); Strasburg, Pennsylvania, U.S.
- Occupation: Musician
- Instruments: Vocals, acoustic guitar
- Years active: 2008–present
- Formerly of: Valerian Sun
- Website: www.valeriansun.com

James Wolpert (born December 26, 1990) is an American singer, best known for his appearance on Season 5 of the NBC singing competition The Voice as part of Adam Levine's team.

== Early life ==
Originally from Strasburg, Pennsylvania, where he graduated from Lampeter-Strasburg High School, Wolpert moved to Pittsburgh to attend Carnegie Mellon University to pursue art, but dropped out and ended up working as an "Apple Store Genius by day and musician by night", before auditioning on The Voice. As a teenager Wolpert appeared on the television show High School Musical: Get in the Picture where he competed for the chance to win a record contract as well as a cameo appearance in High School Musical 3: Senior Year; he finished in fifth place.

He has a younger sister, Rachael. He is a first cousin of actor and singer Jonathan Groff.

== Musical career ==
Wolpert's first major exposure ensued after he auditioned for the fifth season of The Voice. In his blind audition, Wolpert sang "Love Interruption" by Jack White and impressed all four judges Christina Aguilera, Cee Lo Green, Adam Levine and Blake Shelton to turn their chairs, signifying their interest in him joining their team. Ultimately, Wolpert chose to join the team of Adam Levine. Subsequently, he sang "Radioactive" against Will Champlin in the battle round, which he won.

After that, despite his self-described "atrocious" performance, he advanced in the knockout round singing "More Than a Feeling" by Boston. Wolpert commented, "I picked the song because it's super challenging ... as I got on stage, something just went wrong. I am my own worst critic, so I completely recognize it was atrocious [compared] to what it could have been." Nevertheless, Levine chose him to advance, and he moved on to the first live show, singing "A Case of You", which received rave reviews, and was the winner of the "iTunes Bonus" on the show, as his performance was in the top ten of the most downloaded songs on iTunes. Thus, his iTunes votes from the public were multiplied by five, and ultimately, he advanced to the next round. The following week, he sang "Mr. Brightside" by The Killers, advancing to the top 10. After having to wait until the very end of the show to hear that he was saved, he was the first contestant that was saved in the results show the night after he sang "Without You" by Badfinger.

A week later, he sang Queen's "Somebody to Love", and a night later, found out he advanced to the top six. The next week would be the most dramatic of the show to that point. After waking up Monday, December 2, the day of the performance, with little voice, he did not talk all day, and sang two songs, I'd Do Anything for Love (But I Won't Do That) and Fell in Love with a Girl, like each of the other Top Six. The next night, he was in the bottom two on the results show, but was saved from the Twitter save over fellow Pennsylvanian Matthew Schuler, and advanced to the next round. On December 10, 2013, Wolpert finished in fifth place along with Cole Vosbury from Blake's team who finished fourth.

In 2021, Wolpert became the vocalist for hometown supergroup Valerian Sun. The band currently has eight songs to its name, along with winning "Best New Artist" of 2021 at the Central Pennsylvania Music Awards (CPMAs) held at the Hershey Theatre in Hershey, Pennsylvania.

– Studio version of performance reached the top 10 on iTunes

Stage	Song	Original Artist	Date	Order	Result
Blind Audition	"Love Interruption"	Jack White	September 23, 2013	1.14	All four chairs turned Joined Team Adam
Battle Rounds	"Radioactive" (vs. Will Champlin)	Imagine Dragons	October 21, 2013	9.6	Saved by Coach
Knockout Rounds	"More Than a Feeling" (vs. Juhi)	Boston	October 29, 2013	12.5	Saved by Coach
Live Playoffs	"A Case of You"	Joni Mitchell	November 4, 2013	13.2	Saved by Public Vote
Live Top 12	"Mr. Brightside"	The Killers	November 11, 2013	16.3	Saved by Public Vote
Live Top 10	"Without You"	Badfinger	November 18, 2013	18.8	Saved by Public Vote
Live Top 8	"Somebody to Love"	Queen	November 25, 2013	20.1	Saved by Public Vote
Live Top 6	"Fell in Love with a Girl"	The White Stripes	December 2, 2013	22.5	Saved by Instant Save (Bottom 2)
Live Top 6	"I'd Do Anything for Love (But I Won't Do That)"	Meat Loaf	December 2, 2013	22.12	Saved by Instant Save (Bottom 2)
Live Top 5 (Semi-finals)	"With or Without You"	U2	December 9, 2013	24.1	Eliminated

== Discography ==
On February 14, 2014, James released a three-track EP called Forfeiture, Portraiture on his Bandcamp web site. James decided to produce this release by himself. "I want to be literate in terms of sound engineering. I don't want to move forward going into studios where I leave all of that up to the engineer – I've dabbled in that and it's not been bad. I want to know how to exert creative control over what's happening outside of the booth and I think that the best way to do it is to self-produce an album and stumble through it."

Title and details
Forfeiture, Portraiture
- Type: EP
- Released: March 15, 2014
Notes

No.	Title	Length
1.	"Bats"	3:16
2.	"Portraiture (Same Old Questions)"	4:34
3.	"White Moon"	3:26

James then released a full-length album entitled The Entire City. On October 31, 2014, James released the official first single from the album called "Bats". The promotion for the single began the day before with a cryptic message. James released his new record on January 15, 2015 on Bandcamp page and started the tour to promote his record "The Entire City" on January 20.

Title and details
The Entire City
- Type: CD
- Released: January 15, 2015
Notes

No.	Title	Length
1.	"Bats"	3:22
2.	"The Entire City"	4:33
3.	"Blondie"	2:52
4.	"Friends"	4:21
5.	"My Love"	3:09
6.	"White Moon"	3:57
7.	"Portraiture"	3:40
8.	"Another Lonely Night"	2:53
9.	"Transfiguration"	6:25
10.	"Mirage"	4:33
11.	"Reprise"	4:39
12.	"Forfeiture"	4:30
