= Brian Pounds =

American singer-songwriter

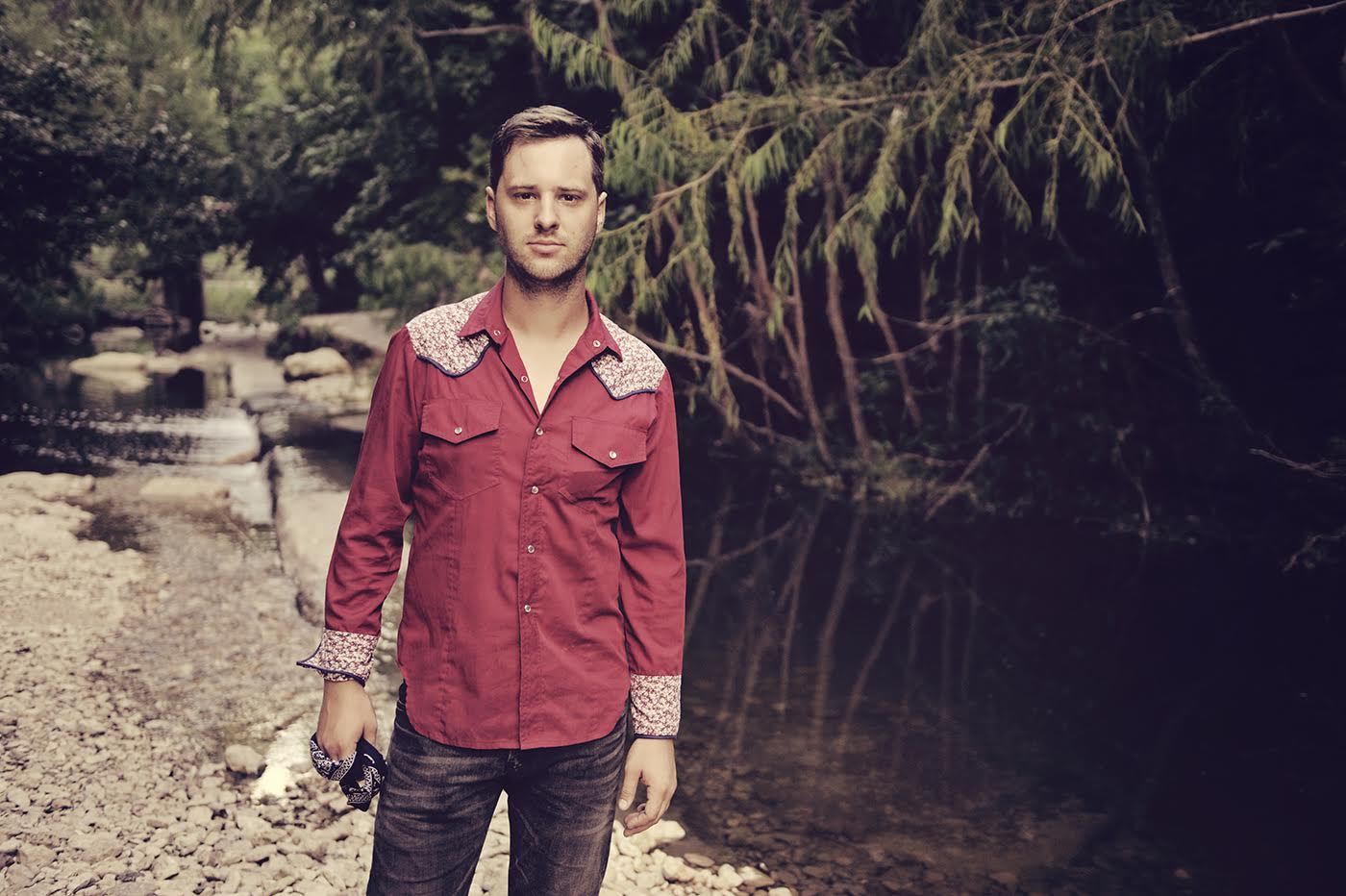

Brian Pounds is a singer-songwriter based in Austin, Texas. He was featured on NBC's reality TV show The Voice in 2013. Pounds has performed alongside country legend Blake Shelton and singer-songwriter Sam Hunt.

On September 2, 2014, Pounds released his new EP, Strikes and Gutters.

The five-song album features original songs as well as a cover of Shane Bartell's "Sunday Dress.”

Strikes and Gutters is the follow-up to Pounds’ debut full-length album, After You’re Gone.

Reviews of Strikes and Gutters which came out, in 2010, drew comparisons between Pounds and James Taylor.

Pounds wrote "Jesus, Don’t Let Me Die (On My Feet)" in the middle of a disastrous two-week gig at a rundown casino in Nevada. The EP’s opening track, "Someday Maybe Carolina" written with fellow The Voice Season-5 competitor Austin Jenckes, currently has more than 9,000 views on YouTube.

In July 2015, the Calgary Herald compared Pounds to singer-songwriter Townes Van Zandt.
