= Will Champlin =

American singer-songwriter (born 1983)

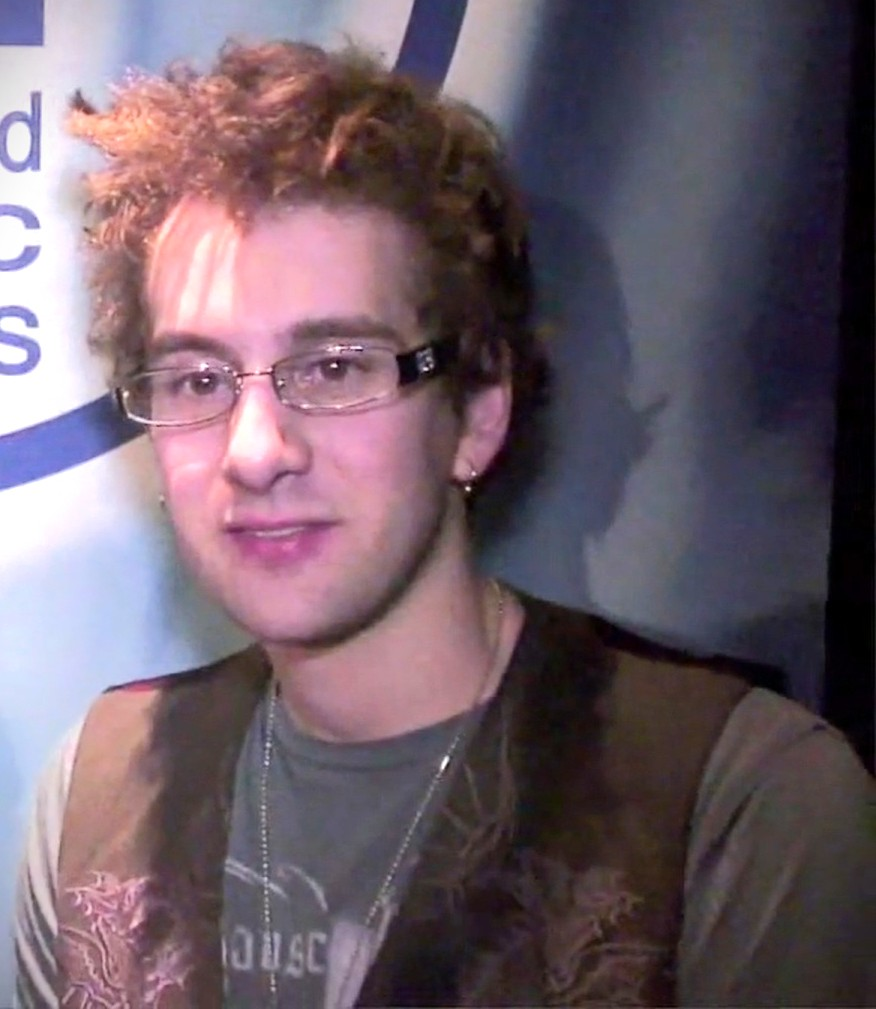
- Champlin in 2008

Background information
- Also known as: KillWill
- Born: William Christopher Champlin; April 24, 1983 (age 43); Reseda, California U.S.
- Genres: Pop, pop rock, R&B
- Occupations: Musician, singer-songwriter
- Instruments: Vocals, banjo, piano, acoustic guitar, drums
- Years active: 2000–present
- Website: http://willchamplin.com/

William Christopher Champlin (born April 24, 1983) is an American singer-songwriter, best known for his appearance on Season 5 of the NBC singing competition The Voice as part of Adam Levine's team. He finished in third place behind Jacquie Lee, the runner-up, and Tessanne Chin, the winner of the season.

== Career ==
Before his participation on The Voice, Champlin reached some success as a songwriter. He collaborated with Michael Caruso and provided backing vocals for Ace Young's self-titled album, and also played piano on Michael Jackson's posthumous compilation album Michael, on the song "(I Like) The Way You Love Me". He was nominated in the Best Contemporary R&B Gospel Album category, for co-writing "Ordinary Me", which appears on Heather Headley's album Audience of One. Audience of One was awarded the 2010 Grammy in its category.

Champlin contributed to the 2013 album "Sacred Ground" released by California Transit Authority, a band created by founding Chicago drummer Danny Seraphine. He sang lead vocals on three tracks: "Strike," which he co-wrote, "Staring at the Sun," and the album's titular track. He also provided background vocals on several other songs on the album. His father, former Chicago member and Sons of Champlin frontman Bill Champlin, also appears on the album.

He is now the lead singer of the gritty rock band Valley of Wolves. They made their debut in 2018 with the release of the Album 'Out for Blood'. In 2019 they released 'Take it All' and in 2021 'Outlaws' was released.

== The Voice ==
On the fourth episode of the Blind Auditions broadcast on October 1, 2013, he performed Gavin DeGraw's song "Not Over You." Adam Levine, Cee Lo Green, and Blake Shelton turned their chairs but he opted to join Adam Levine.

In the Battle Rounds, Wolpert won, and Champlin was stolen by Aguilera. In the Knockout Rounds, Schuler won, and Champlin was then stolen back from Aguilera by Levine.

– Studio version of performance reached the top 10 on iTunes

Stage	Song	Original Artist	Date	Order	Result
Blind Audition	"Not Over You"	Gavin DeGraw	October 1, 2013	4.1	Adam Levine, Cee Lo Green, and Blake Shelton turned Joined Team Adam
Battle Rounds	"Radioactive" (vs. James Wolpert)	Imagine Dragons	October 21, 2013	9.6	Defeated; Stolen by Christina Aguilera
Knockout Rounds	"When I Was Your Man" (vs. Matthew Schuler)	Bruno Mars	October 29, 2013	12.8	Defeated; Stolen by Adam Levine
Live Playoffs	"Secrets"	OneRepublic	November 4, 2013	13.7	Saved by Coach
Live Top 12	"Demons"	Imagine Dragons	November 11, 2013	16.12	Saved by Public Vote
Live Top 10	"Love Me Again"	John Newman	November 18, 2013	18.3	Saved by Public Vote
Live Top 8	"At Last"	Glenn Miller and his orchestra, with vocals by Ray Eberle and Pat Friday	November 25, 2013	20.6	Saved by Public Vote
Live Top 6	"A Change Is Gonna Come"	Sam Cooke	December 2, 2013	22.4	Saved by Public Vote
Live Top 6	"Hey Brother"	Avicii	December 2, 2013	22.10	Saved by Public Vote
Live Top 5 (Semi-finals)	"Carry On"	Fun	December 9, 2013	24.2	Saved by Public Vote
Live Finale	"Not Over You"	Gavin DeGraw	December 16, 2013	26.2	Third place
Live Finale	"Tiny Dancer" (with Adam Levine)	Elton John	December 16, 2013	26.6	Third place
Live Finale	"(Everything I Do) I Do It for You"	Bryan Adams	December 16, 2013	26.8	Third place

== Personal life ==
Champlin was born and raised in Los Angeles, California. He is the youngest son of Bill Champlin, former member of Chicago, and Tamara Champlin. He graduated from the Berklee College of Music in Boston, Massachusetts. He has one daughter, Harper.

== Discography ==
=== Studio albums ===
Title	Album details	Peak chart positions
Title	Album details	US
Will Champlin	Release: January 10, 2008; Label: Goldmine Records; Formats: Digital download	—
Borrowing Trouble	Release: June 21, 2014; Label: Independent; Formats: CD, digital download	—

=== Singles ===
Title	Year	Peak chart positions		Album
Title	Year	US	CAN	Album
"Last Man Standing"	2014	—	—	Borrowing Trouble
"Eye of the Pyramid"	2014	—	—	Borrowing Trouble
"Picasso in My Pocket"	2018	—	—	Picasso in My Pocket

=== Guest appearances ===
Title	Year	Artist(s)	Album
"Too Far Gone"	2019	Sound Breakers	—N/a

=== Releases from The Voice ===
Title	Album details	Peak chart positions
Title	Album details	US
The Complete Season 5 Collection	Release date: December 17, 2013; Label: Republic Records; Formats: Digital download	—

Single	Year	Peak chart positions	
Single	Year	US	CAN
"At Last"	2013	83	73
"Carry On"	2013	—	97
"—" denotes items which failed to chart.
