= List of Billboard number-one disco singles of 1981 =

The Disco Top 100 was a chart published weekly by Billboard magazine in the United States, which ranked the popularity of disco singles in nightclubs across the country, based on a national survey of club disc jockeys. The chart was reduced to 80 positions on August 1, 1981.

== Chart history ==
| Issue date | Song | Artist |
|---|---|---|
| January 3 | "Celebration"/"Take It to the Top" | Kool & The Gang |
| January 10 | "Celebration"/"Take It to the Top" | Kool & The Gang |
| January 17 | "Celebration"/"Take It to the Top" | Kool & The Gang |
| January 24 | "You're Too Late" | Fantasy |
| January 31 | "You're Too Late" | Fantasy |
| February 7 | "You're Too Late" | Fantasy |
| February 14 | "You're Too Late" | Fantasy |
| February 21 | "You're Too Late" | Fantasy |
| February 28 | "Rapture"/"The Tide Is High" | Blondie |
| March 7 | "Rapture"/"The Tide Is High" | Blondie |
| March 14 | "Rapture"/"The Tide Is High" | Blondie |
| March 21 | "Rapture"/"The Tide Is High" | Blondie |
| March 28 | "Breaking and Entering"/"Easy Money" | Dee Dee Sharp-Gamble |
| April 4 | "Breaking and Entering"/"Easy Money" | Dee Dee Sharp-Gamble |
| April 11 | "Breaking and Entering"/"Easy Money" | Dee Dee Sharp-Gamble |
| April 18 | "Breaking and Entering"/"Easy Money" | Dee Dee Sharp-Gamble |
| April 25 | "Your Love"/"You're My Magician" | Lime |
| May 2 | "Lay All Your Love on Me"/"Super Trouper"/"On and On and On" | ABBA |
| May 9 | "Paradise"/"Hold Tight"/"Heaven of My Life" | Change |
| May 16 | "Paradise"/"Hold Tight"/"Heaven of My Life" | Change |
| May 23 | "Paradise"/"Hold Tight"/"Heaven of My Life" | Change |
| May 30 | "Paradise"/"Hold Tight"/"Heaven of My Life" | Change |
| June 6 | "Paradise"/"Hold Tight"/"Heaven of My Life" | Change |
| June 13 | "Try It Out"/"Hold Tight" | Gino Soccio |
| June 20 | "Try It Out"/"Hold Tight" | Gino Soccio |
| June 27 | "Try It Out"/"Hold Tight" | Gino Soccio |
| July 4 | "Try It Out"/"Hold Tight" | Gino Soccio |
| July 11 | "Try It Out"/"Hold Tight" | Gino Soccio |
| July 18 | "Try It Out"/"Hold Tight" | Gino Soccio |
| July 25 | "Give It to Me Baby"/"Super Freak"/"Ghetto Life" | Rick James |
| August 1 | "Give It to Me Baby"/"Super Freak"/"Ghetto Life" | Rick James |
| August 8 | "Give It to Me Baby"/"Super Freak"/"Ghetto Life" | Rick James |
| August 15 | "I'm in Love" | Evelyn King |
| August 22 | "I'm in Love" | Evelyn King |
| August 29 | "I'm in Love" | Evelyn King |
| September 5 | "Dancin' the Night Away" | Voggue |
| September 12 | "Dancin' the Night Away" | Voggue |
| September 19 | "Dancin' the Night Away" | Voggue |
| September 26 | "A Little Bit of Jazz" | Nick Straker Band |
| October 3 | "Zulu" | The Quick |
| October 10 | "Zulu" | The Quick |
| October 17 | "Do You Love Me"/"The Genie" | Patti Austin |
| October 24 | "Do You Love Me"/"The Genie" | Patti Austin |
| October 31 | "Menergy"/"I Wanna Take You Home" | Patrick Cowley |
| November 7 | "Menergy"/"I Wanna Take You Home" | Patrick Cowley |
| November 14 | "Controversy"/"Let's Work" | Prince |
| November 21 | "Controversy"/"Let's Work" | Prince |
| November 28 | "Controversy"/"Let's Work" | Prince |
| December 5 | "Controversy"/"Let's Work" | Prince |
| December 12 | "Controversy"/"Let's Work" | Prince |
| December 19 | "Controversy"/"Let's Work" | Prince |
| December 26 | "You Can"/"Fire in My Heart" | Madleen Kane |

== See also ==
- 1981 in music
- List of Billboard Hot 100 number ones of 1981
