= 10: 1993–2003 – Ten Years Of =

10: 1993-2003 – Ten Years Of

Compilation album by K's Choice
- Released: 2003; 10 August 2004 (USA)
- Genre: Alternative rock, Folk rock
- Length: 64:29
- Label: Sony Music

K's Choice chronology
Running Backwards In A Corn Field (2003)	10: 1993-2003 – Ten Years Of (2003)	The Essential K's Choice (2009)

10: 1993–2003 – Ten Years Of is a compilation album by K's Choice released in 2003. It peaked at position 9 in the Belgian and at 73 in the Dutch album charts.

== Track listing ==
All tracks written by Gert Bettens and Sarah Bettens. All tracks remastered by Benjamin Bertozzi at Jet Mastering, Brussels, Belgium.

No.	Title	Length
1.	"Losing You" (unreleased single)	4:07
2.	"Not an Addict"	4:48
3.	"Believe"	3:32
4.	"Almost Happy"	3:45
5.	"My Heart"	3:25
6.	"The Ballad of Lea and Paul"	3:15
7.	"I Smoke a Lot"	2:52
8.	"Little Man" (B-side)	3:52
9.	"Another Year"	3:27
10.	"Mr. Freeze"	4:29
11.	"Dad"	3:04
12.	"Winners"	3:51
13.	"If You're Not Scared"	3:17
14.	"Everything for Free"	3:43
15.	"Busy"	3:37
16.	"Virgin State of Mind" (unreleased single)	3:13
17.	"Until I'm Fine" (B-side, unreleased single)	3:07
18.	"God in My Bed"	3:05

Note: Track 16, "Virgin State of Mind", was first heard on the Buffy the Vampire Slayer American television series when K's Choice appeared/performed on "Doppelgangland" – the 16th episode of the 3rd season, originally broadcast February 23, 1999, on The WB network. The track was later included on the Buffy the Vampire Slayer: The Album soundtrack album, released October 19, 1999.
