= Echo Mountain (album) =

Studio album by K's Choice
- Released: 26 March 2010
- Recorded: Echo Mountain Studios in 2009
- Genre: Alternative rock
- Length: 48:49
- Label: Epic

K's Choice chronology
Almost Happy (2000)	Echo Mountain (2010)	The Phantom Cowboy (2015)

Professional ratings
Review scores
Source	Rating
Allmusic	3.5/5 stars

Echo Mountain is the fifth studio album of the Belgian rock band K's Choice. After a reunion concert at Dranouter festival in August 2009 the band started recording new material in the Echo Mountain Studios in Asheville, North Carolina. On 22 February 2010 they confirmed on their website that the new album would be released on 26 March 2010. "When I Lay Beside You" (#3 at the singles charts) and "Come Live The Life" were released as singles.

== Track listing ==
All tracks are written by Sam (as Sarah) and Gert Bettens.

CD 1
No.	Title	Length
1.	"Come Live The Life"	4:13
2.	"Let it grow"	3:54
3.	"Echo Mountain"	3:58
4.	"When I Lay Beside You"	4:00
5.	"Perfect"	3:15
6.	"I will carry you"	2:24
7.	"If this isn't right"	3:16

CD 2
No.	Title	Length
1.	"Say a prayer"	4:00
2.	"These are the thoughts"	2:42
3.	"16"	3:10
4.	"Killing Dragons"	2:46
5.	"America"	4:33
6.	"Along for the ride"	3:06
7.	"How simple can it be"	3:15
8.	"Show me how it's done" (extra track contained in special release for Free Record Shop)	2:38

== Personnel ==
Musicians:

- Sarah Bettens
- Gert Bettens
- Eric Grossman
- Koen Lieckens
- Reinout Swinnen
- Thomas Vanelslander

== Charts performance ==
=== Weekly charts ===
Chart (2010)	Peak position
Belgian Albums (Ultratop Flanders)	1
Belgian Albums (Ultratop Wallonia)	15
Dutch Albums (Album Top 100)	5
Swiss Albums (Schweizer Hitparade)	46

=== Year-end charts ===
Chart (2010)	Position
Belgian Albums (Ultratop Flanders)	37
Dutch Albums (Album Top 100)	94

=== Single charts ===
Title	Peak positions	
Title	BEL	NED
"When I Lay Beside You"	3 (Flanders); 20 (Wallonia)	–
"Come Live The Life"	11 (Flanders); 30 (Wallonia)	86
