= Almost Happy (album) =

Studio album by K's Choice
- Released: 26 October 2000
- Genres: Indie rock, folk rock
- Length: 47:47
- Labels: Double T, Epic
- Producers: Marshall Bird & Steve Bush

K's Choice chronology
Cocoon Crash (1998)	Almost Happy (2000)	Echo Mountain (2010)

Alternative cover
- The cover of the 2002 release

Professional ratings
Review scores
Source	Rating
Allmusic	3/5 stars

Almost Happy is the fourth studio album by Belgian rock band K's Choice.

== Music ==
Almost Happy was recorded at Real World Studio's, Box, Wiltshire (UK) and published in 2000. Singles were "Almost Happy", "Busy" and "Another Year". The lyrics of this album are more autobiographical than of the previous album (Cocoon Crash). The music is, when compared to earlier work, more melancholy and intimate. The American (2002) version included an additional live CD and was published with another cover, featuring a drawing by band member Gert Bettens, who had also drawn the album covers for the two previous albums.

== Track listing ==
All tracks are written by Sarah and Gert Bettens.

CD 1
No.	Title	Length
1.	"Intro" (a Dutch children's song from Gert and Sarah's younger years)	0:21
2.	"Another Year"	3:30
3.	"Almost Happy"	3:45
4.	"My Head"	3:43
5.	"Live for Real"	3:50
6.	"Somewhere"	3:03
7.	"Home"	2:51
8.	"Tired"	3:40
9.	"Always Everywhere"	4:10
10.	"Shadowman"	6:26
11.	"Favorite Adventure (The Wedding Song)"	2:47
12.	"Busy"	3:39
13.	"All" (including hidden track "Already There", an a cappella song)	6:02

CD 2 (live)
No.	Title	Length
1.	"Hide"	4:20
2.	"Cocoon Crash"	2:48
3.	"Breakfast"	3:00
4.	"Winter"	3:10
5.	"If You're Not Scared"	5:09
6.	"I Smoke a Lot"	2:55
7.	"Not an Addict"	4:38
8.	"My Heart"	3:28
9.	"Mr. Freeze"	3:48
10.	"Elegia"	4:08
11.	"Everything for Free"	3:47
12.	"Believe"	3:30
13.	"Butterflies Instead"	3:41
14.	"Laughing as I Pray"	1:29
15.	"God in My Bed"	3:03

=== Personnel ===
Musicians:

- Sam Bettens - vocals, guitar
- Gert Bettens - guitar, vocals
- Koen Lieckens - drums
- Jan van Sichem Jr. - guitar
- Eric Grossman - bass

Guest musicians:

- Marshall Bird - keyboards

Mixed by Tchad Blake

Cover picture by Lieve Blanquaert

== Charts ==
=== Weekly charts ===
Chart (2000)	Peak position
Belgian Albums (Ultratop Flanders)	3
Belgian Albums (Ultratop Wallonia)	19
Dutch Albums (Album Top 100)	7
French Albums (SNEP)	22
German Albums (Offizielle Top 100)	81
Swiss Albums (Schweizer Hitparade)	36

=== Year-end charts ===
Chart (2000)	Position
Belgian Albums (Ultratop Flanders)	42
Dutch Albums (Album Top 100)	72

== Certifications ==
Region	Certification	Certified units/sales
Belgium (BRMA)	Gold	25,000^{*}
^{*} Sales figures based on certification alone.
