= Eric Grossman =

American musician (born 1964)

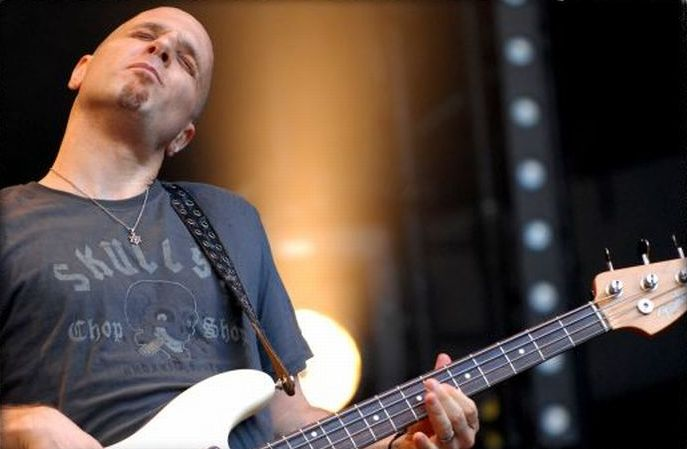

Background information
- Born: November 25, 1964 (age 61)
- Origin: United States
- Instrument: Bass guitar

Eric Grossman (born November 25, 1964, New York) is an American musician, best known for playing bass and recording gold and platinum albums with the Belgian band K's Choice.

== Biography ==
Grossman was born in 1964 in New York, the older of two boys. Both of his parents worked in the optical business—his father owned a shop. Grossman attended Birmingham High School in Van Nuys, California, graduating in 1982. He went on to study music theory at Pierce College in Woodland Hills, California, but dropped out to focus on his music. It was also at Pierce College that he met Dr. Gerald Eskalin, founder of the L.A. Jazz Choir, with whom he performed in the late 1980s. In the early 1990s he performed in the band Iannello, playing with guitarist Joel Shearer and drummer Jimmy Paxson for six years.

It was through Shearer that Grossman connected with K's Choice. Shearer had been playing with the band Super 8, which had the same manager as K's Choice. The manager recommended Grossman to the leaders of K's Choice, at a time when they were auditioning for a new bass player. Grossman won the part, and in 1997 toured with K's Choice in support of their album Paradise in Me. He then joined the band full-time, and with them has recorded four gold and platinum records, including Almost Happy and Cocoon Crash. His work with the band included thousands of performances, and many appearances on European television, such as the French program Taratata. He also appeared with the band on a 1999 episode of Buffy the Vampire Slayer, "Doppelgangland".

Grossman currently lives with his wife and children in St. Louis, Missouri. In 2005, Grossman started recording and touring with Sam Bettens (who he has also worked with as a member of K's Choice), and in 2007 he began performing with Javier Mendoza. In 2011, he began playing with Dilana Smith from the hit television show, Rock Star Supernova.

== Discography ==
=== K's Choice bassist ===
- 1998, Cocoon Crash, sold over 1,000,000 copies, and went platinum in Belgium and the Netherlands
- 2001, K's Choice Live
- 2002, Almost Happy
- 2004, 10: 1993-2003 Ten Years Of K's Choice

=== Other ===
- 2005, Scream, Sam Bettens
- 2007, Shine, Sam Bettens
