= The Great Subconscious Club =

Studio album by K's Choice
- Released: 27 September 1994
- Recorded: 1994
- Genre: Alternative rock, folk rock
- Length: 37:01
- Label: Double T, 550
- Producer: Jean Blaute

K's Choice chronology
The Great Subconscious Club (1994)	Paradise in Me (1996)

Professional ratings
Review scores
Source	Rating
Allmusic	3/5 stars

The Great Subconscious Club is the debut album of the Belgian band K's Choice recorded in 1994. It was originally produced under the name The Choice, but the band changed names. "Me Happy", "Breakfast", "I Smoke a Lot" and "The Ballad of Lea & Paul" were released as singles. The name of the album is taken from the lyrics to the song "Try To Get Some Sleep", the B-side of "I Smoke a Lot", which also appeared on the compilation Extra Cocoon. At this time the band merely existed out of Sam (then Sarah) and Gert Bettens, who were joined by others (who didn't return for any of the later albums of K's Choice).

== Track listing ==
All tracks are written by Sam and Gert Bettens.

No.	Title	Length
1.	"Me Happy"	3:00
2.	"Breakfast"	2:42
3.	"I Smoke a Lot"	2:54
4.	"Walk Away"	2:43
5.	"Elegia"	4:03
6.	"My Heart"	3:22
7.	"I Wanna Meet the Man"	3:06
8.	"What the Hell Is Love"	2:54
9.	"I Will Return to You"	3:47
10.	"The Ballad of Lea & Paul"	3:17
11.	"Winter"	3:08
12.	"Laughing as I Pray"	3:10

== Personnel ==
- Sarah Bettens - Vocals
- Gert Bettens - Guitar, keyboards, vocals, drawing
- Jean Blaute - Bass guitar, guitar, keyboards, producer
- Luk Degraaff - Bass guitar
- Evert Verhees - Bass guitar
- Stoy Stoffelen - Percussion, drums
- Walter Mets - Percussion, drums
- Marc Francois - Engineer
- Werner Pensaert - Engineer
- Vladimir Meller - Mastering
- Jurgen Rogiers - Photography

== Release details ==
Country	Date	Label	Format	Catalog
	1994	Sony	CD	66325
			Cassette	66325
	1995	Epic	CD	474949
