= Colin Campsie =

British singer

- Born: 1957 (age 67–68)
- Origin: England
- Genres: Pop, new wave
- Occupation(s): Singer, songwriter
- Years active: 1978–present

Colin Campsie (born 1957) is a British singer and songwriter. He was a member of the 1980s pop bands the Quick and Giant Steps.

== Biography ==
Campsie originally formed the soft rock/funk group Grand Hotel along with long time collaborator George McFarlane in 1978. After constantly gigging in the South London area, they teamed up with manager Tom Watkins and issued one album, Do Not Disturb on CBS Records. After Grand Hotel, Campsie and McFarlane turned to new wave music and became the Quick, having their first success in Australia with the top ten hit "Hip, Shake, Jerk". The Quick then had U.S. No. 1 dance chart hits with "Zulu" and "The Rhythm of the Jungle". The Quick later changed their name to Giant Steps and scored a Billboard/AT40 hit with the song "Another Lover".

== Songwriting and other work ==
In the 1980s, Campsie co-wrote and produced the U.S. dance hit "Baby Doll" for the girl group Girls Can't Help It and was also closely involved with, but not a member of the pop band Go West.

Campsie then turned his talents to songwriting, including the Chantelle Houghton song "I Want It Right Now" (originally slated for Kylie Minogue) via the spoof group Kandy Floss. He has also written tracks for Natalie Imbruglia, including "Don't You Think?" and "Wishing I Was There" (a U.S. Billboard top 10 hit) on Imbruglia's debut album Left of the Middle. Campsie also co-wrote the top 10 hit "I Quit" by Hepburn. He has also co-written the tracks "Ouch That Hurt!" and "Under My Skin" with Phil Thornalley, the latter appearing on Thornalley's only solo album Swamp. Campsie also co-wrote "Mads Hauge" for US singer-songwriter Warren Avis' debut Lucky Seven, the UK top 10 hit "Cry Me Out" for Pixie Lott and rewrote the lyrics of the hymn "I Vow to Thee My Country" for The Chelsea Pensioners album, the song now titled "For King and Country". Other artists who have covered his songs include Chaka Khan, Melanie C, Jennifer Paige, Lulu, BoA and Beverley Craven.

== Personal life ==
Campsie married singer Beverley Craven and had three daughters. The couple divorced in 2011.
