= Another Lover (disambiguation) =

"Another Lover" is a 1988 song by Giant Steps.

"Another Lover" may also refer to:

- "Another Lover" (Dane Bowers song), 2001
- "Another Lover", a song by Bananarama, B-side to "Last Thing on My Mind", 1992
- "Another Lover", a song by Hear'Say from Popstars, 2001
- "Another Lover", a song by the Pasadenas, 1991
- "Another Lover", a song by Tokio Hotel from 2001, 2022
- "Another Lover", a song by White Town from Peek & Poke, 1998
