= Cocoon Crash =

Studio album by K's Choice
- Released: 3 April 1998
- Recorded: ICP Studios (Brussels, Belgium)
- Genres: Alternative rock, folk rock, post-grunge, jangle pop
- Length: 47:10
- Labels: Double T, 550
- Producer: Gil Norton

K's Choice chronology
Paradise in Me (1996)	Cocoon Crash (1998)	Almost Happy (2000)

Professional ratings
Review scores
Source	Rating
Allmusic	4/5 stars

Cocoon Crash is the third studio album of the Belgian band K's Choice, released in April 1998. Its singles were "Believe", "Everything for Free", and "If You're Not Scared". Musically, it is comparable to their second album, Paradise in Me, though with a generally lighter tone and subject matter. The album was released in the United States on 9 June 1998.

Since its release, Cocoon Crash has sold more than 1,000,000 copies, and went platinum in Belgium and Netherlands. The album was produced by Gil Norton (Pixies, Counting Crows, Feeder).

== Track listing ==
All tracks are written by Sam (as Sarah) and Gert Bettens.

No.	Title	Length
1.	"Believe"	3:30
2.	"In Your Room"	3:37
3.	"Everything for Free"	3:44
4.	"Now is Mine"	2:51
5.	"Butterflies Instead"	3:34
6.	"If You're Not Scared"	3:17
7.	"20,000 Seconds"	2:24
8.	"Too Many Happy Faces"	3:28
9.	"Cocoon Crash"	3:10
10.	"Hide"	4:08
11.	"Freestyle"	3:17
12.	"Quiet Little Place"	3:14
13.	"God in My Bed"	3:03
14.	"Winners"	3:53

== Personnel ==
- Sarah Bettens – vocals, guitar
- Gert Bettens – guitar, keyboards, vocals
- Jan Van Sichem Jr. – guitar on "Cocoon Crash"
- Eric Grossman – bass
- Bart Van Der Zeeuw – drums, percussion

=== Additional personnel ===
Luis Jardin – percussion Roy Spong – percussion Mark Pythian – programming

== Chart performance ==
Country	Peak position	Certifications
BEL	1 (Flanders); 15 (Wallonia)	Platinum
FRA	45	–
GER	90	–
NED	5	Platinum
SUI	48	–
