= Kapellen, Belgium =

Kapellen
- Municipality
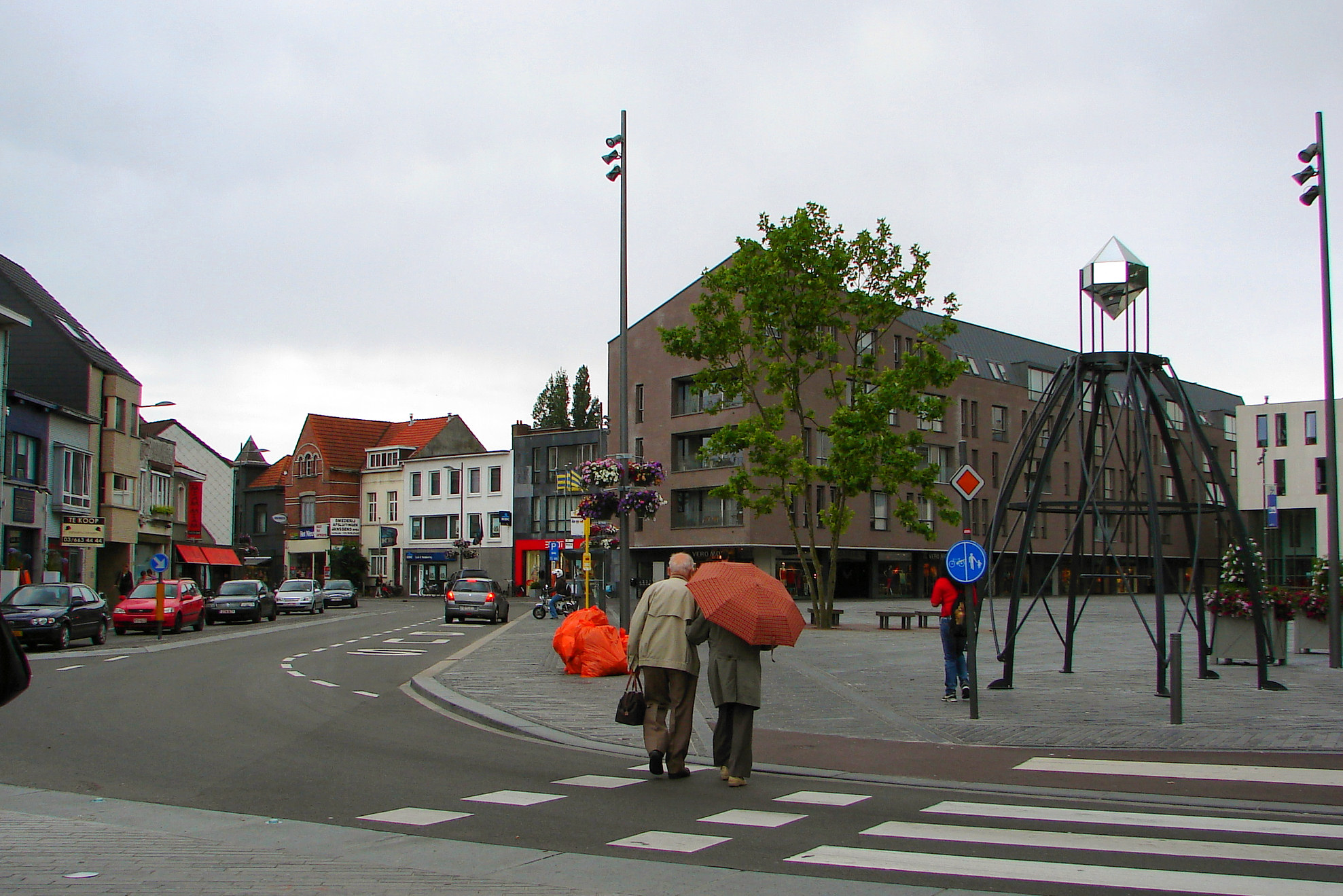
- Town centre

- Flag Coat of arms

- Location of Kapellen in the province of Antwerp
- Interactive map of Kapellen
- Location in Belgium
- Coordinates: 51°19′N 04°26′E
- Country: Belgium
- Community: Flemish Community
- Region: Flemish Region
- Province: Antwerp
- Arrondissement: Antwerp

Government
  - Mayor: Dirk Van Mechelen (open VLD)
  - Governing parties: open VLD, N-VA

Area
  - Total: 37.22 km^{2} (14.37 sq mi)

Population (2020-01-01)
  - Total: 26,981
  - Density: 724.9/km^{2} (1,877/sq mi)
- Postal codes: 2950
- NIS code: 11023
- Area codes: 03
- Website: www.kapellen.be

Kapellen (Dutch pronunciation: [kaːˈpɛlə(n)], old spelling: Cappellen) is a municipality in the Belgian province of Antwerp. The municipality lies in the Campine in the northern part of the province.

Kapellen consists only of the town of Kapellen proper. In 2021, Kapellen had a total population of 27,157. The total area is 37.11 km^{2}. Kapellen consists out of multiple neighbourhoods, Kapellen Center, the eastern part of Putte, Kapellenbos, Hoogboom and Zilverenhoek. A number of neighbourhoods in Kapellen have a residential character and are characterized by their villaparcs, exclusive country houses, and beautiful castles. Many who flee the always busy town enjoy Kapellen's peaceful nature.

The town's football club is R. Cappellen F.C. and has played at the national level for many years.

== History ==
The communities that are now part of Kapellen date back to the 13th century. Hoogboom can be found as Hobonia on documents from 1267. Hoghescote, the current center can be seen 10 years after Hoogboom in Ertbrand, which has now become Putte. The Zilverenhoek neighborhood, only a part of Kapellen since 1983, first appeared in 1844 on a cadastral plan.

Since its origin Kapellen has been a part of lordship Ekeren. Since the 13th century, parts of the territory have regularly changed ownership. Eventually, in 1714 the entire lordship Ekeren came under the ownership of one family, one of the lords Salm-Salm. During the French occupation, Kapellen became, in 1795, part of the municipality Stabroek until it, eventually, in 1800, became its own municipality. Since then they have slowly been adding neighborhoods of Ekeren, Hoevenen and Stabroek to the territory of Kapellen. The current municipal borders have been determined since 1983 when the neighborhoods Hoogboom and Zilverenhoek from Ekeren became part of Kapellen.

In comparison to its worldly power, its spiritual power has had a less complex history. The parish of Hoghescote became part of the St. Bernard's Abbey of Hemiksem. Until then the parish depended on the Saint-Lambertus church of Ekeren.

The church of Kapellen is the oldest building in the municipality. Until the 14th century a chapel sufficed to help the people who lived there. The church has been built up and renovated further throughout the ages. The chancel for example dates back to the 14th century while the Transept was built in the 16th century. During the 19th century, the tower and the interior of the church were renovated in with a neogothic look.

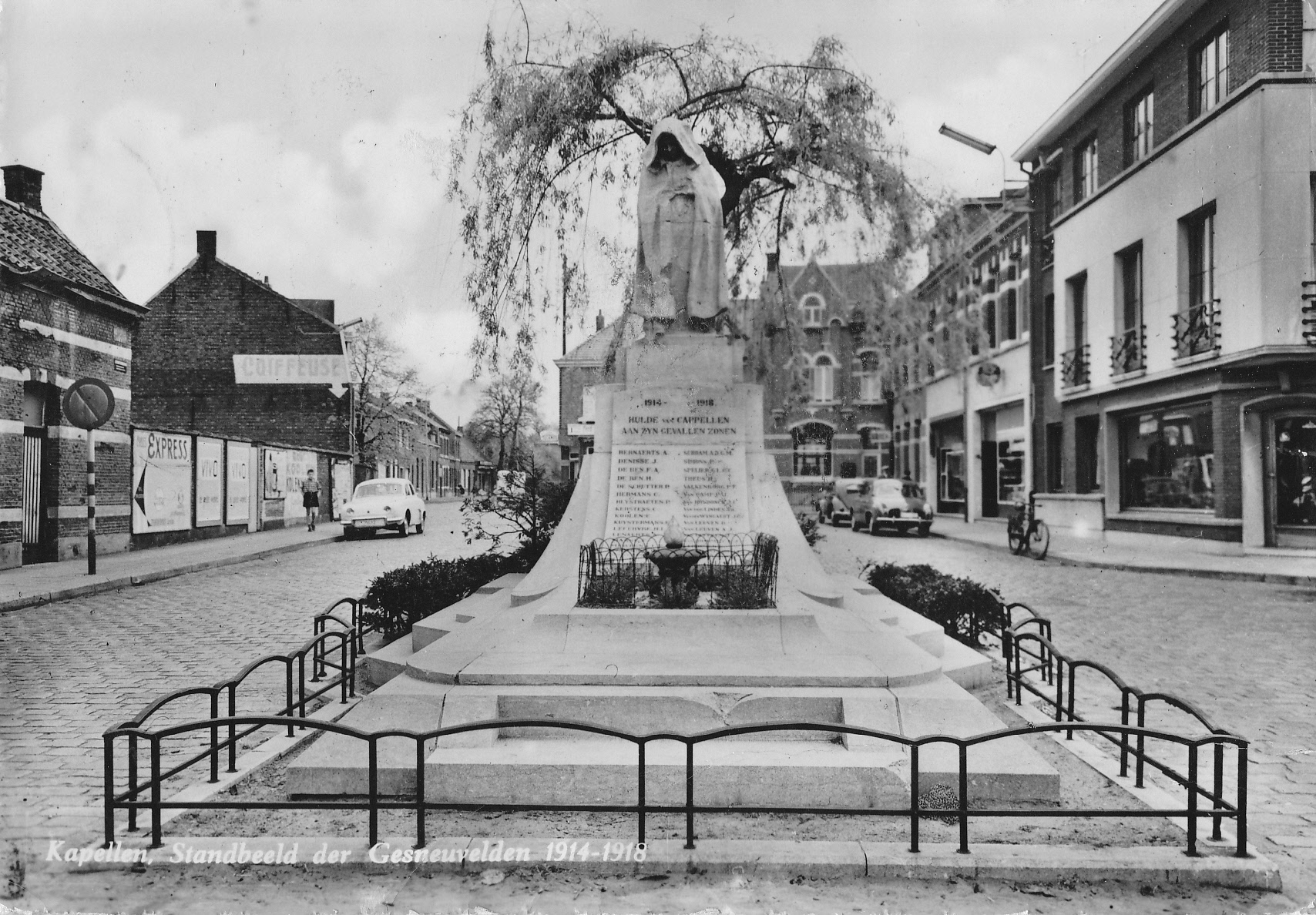
Monument for the fallen soldiers.

The further history of Kapellen is characterized by periods of growth and poverty. During the Fall of Antwerp Kapellen suffered greatly. All important buildings and 90% of all houses were destroyed. During the Twelve Years' Truce there was a short resurgence of the municipality until 1623, when the plague raged. The real resurgence had to wait until 1674 when the church was rebuilt.

All this abruptly ended with the start of World War I. The forced service for the German army and the Spanish flu caused many deaths. After the war, there was a brief recovery period until 1930, when a crisis fell over the municipality. Recovery had to wait until after World War II. The municipality Kapellen was freed on 4 October 1944 by the Canadian battalion Les Fusiliers Mont-Royal.

== Demographics ==
=== Evolution of the population ===
==== 19th century ====
Year	1806	1816	1830	1846	1856	1866	1876	1880	1890
Population	913	903	1445	2504	2453	2760	3031	3061	3489
Growth		−1.10%	+60.02%	+73.29%	−2.04%	+12.52%	+9.82%	+0.99%	+13.98%
Results of the census on 31 December

==== 20th century until the reorganization of municipalities ====
Year	1900	1910	1920	1930	1947	1961	1970	1980	1982
Population	4072	5282	6291	7926	9680	11.474	13.352	14.304	14.648
Growth	+16.71%	+29.72%	+19.10%	+25.99%	+22.13%	+18.53%	+16.37%	+7.13%	+2.40%
Results census on 31 December until 1970 + 1 January 1980 + 31 December 1982

==== After the reorganization of municipalities ====
Year	1983	1985	1990	1995	2000	2005	2006	2007
Population	22.471	22.549	23.977	25.290	25.671	25.975	25.948	26.104
Growth	+53.41%	+0.35%	+6.33%	+5.48%	+1.51%	+1.18%	−0.10%	+0.60%
Population on 1 January – Source: NIS

Year	2009	2010	2011	2012	2013	2014	2015	2016	2017	2018	2019
Population	26.410	26.423	26.434	26.532	26.483	26.529	26.642	26.745	26.750	26.771	26.850
Growth	+1.17%	+0.05%	+0.04%	+0.37%	−0.18%	+0.17%	+0.43%	+0.39%	+0.02%	+0.08%	+0.30%
Population on 1 January – Source: NIS + municipality Kapellen (2010–2015)

Historical populations

== Transport ==
=== Past ===
In 1759 a cobblestone road was built between Merksem and Kapellen. These days this (no longer cobblestone) road is known as the Kapelsesteenweg (on the territory of Ekeren and Brasschaat) or the Antwerpsesteenweg (on the territory of Kapellen). In 1853 the railroad Antwerp-Rotterdam was built. Thanks to this railroad the first steam powered train could run through Kapellen railway station in 1854. Because of the railroad connection many rich people from Antwerp decided to build villas in the municipality. The local railways reached Kapellen on 31 July 1927 and the tram was extended to the border of Putte on 1 December 1928. The level crossing of the tram and the railroad was there for just short period of time. On 1 March 1934 the railway connection between Hoevenen and Kapellen is opened and from 1 February 1938 forward trams between Antwerp and Putte rode through Hoevenen. (Line 72, between 1 September 1936 and 1 February 1938 no passenger trams rode between Kapellen and Putte). Since 31 August 1936 the tram from Merksem was limited to just before the railroad crossing (line 65). On 26 May 1967 the last tram rode through Kapellen, as line 65.

== Famous inhabitants ==
- Christine Soetewey, retired Belgian high jumper
- Sam Bettens and Gert Bettens, musicians, K's Choice
- Geert Grub (1896–1980), poet, writer and Flemish activist
- Margaretha Guidone, activist for the environment and against global warming
- Didier Ilunga Mbenga, NBA basketball player
- Baron Paul Kronacker (1897–1994), politician
- Tom De Mul, former football player
- Kevin Van Dessel, former football player
- Dirk Van Mechelen, politician, Flemish minister
- Thomas Vermaelen, former football player
- Gordan Vidovic, former football player
- Rocco Granata, singer
- Mathieu van der Poel, cyclist
- Axel Veerkamp, director
