= A Balladeer =

Dutch band

A Balladeer (styled as a balladeer) is a Dutch band, originating from Amsterdam, founded by singer-songwriter Marinus de Goederen.

In 2002, the band won the 3FM BuZz Award and another award the following year at the final of the annual Dutch musical contest De Grote Prijs van Nederland (The Grand Prize of the Netherlands). In 2004, A Balladeer opened up for international acts Saybia and Keane and released their first EP: Rumor Had It. The EP featured 4 songs, including the critically acclaimed "They've Shut Down Marks & Spencer", which resulted in considerable airplay in the Netherlands.

On 5 May 2006, A Balladeer's debut album titled Panama was released by EMI Music. The single "Swim with Sam" was the first single. It became a hit in the Netherlands. The album was recorded in Brussels in 2005 with Bløf producer Ronald Vanhuffel. Robert Kirby (known for his work with Nick Drake) arranged the strings for three songs. In early 2007, the band won a Zilveren Harp (Silver Harp), a supporting prize for promising musical artists. In February 2007, their third single was released, a ballad called "Robin II".

The second album, Where Are You, Bambi Woods?, was released on 29 August 2008. The album is partly about the year the lead singer lived near Dallas, Texas. Its title track is about the disappearance of porn star Bambi Woods (known from her role in Debbie Does Dallas). 'Poster Child' is an ode to the murdered student Matthew Shepard. In 2009 the album got nominated for an Edison, a Dutch Grammy.

The third album, I Can't Keep Track Of Each Fallen Robin, was released on 19 October 2012. The single 'Mob Wife' (2017) features Sam Bettens of K's Choice. The original version of the song is taken from A Wolf at the Door, which was released on 11 March 2016.

== Band line up ==
=== Current members ===
- Marinus de Goederen – vocals, piano, guitar

=== Past members ===
- Walter Wilhelm – bass guitar (2003–2004)
- Erik Meereboer – guitar, backing vocals (2003–2010)
- Tijs Stehmann – drums (2003–2013)

=== Session members ===
- Peter Slager (Bløf) – bass guitar (studio)
- Bas Kennis (Bløf) – Hammond, accordion (studio)
- Charlie Dée – backing vocals
- Arn Kortooms – bass guitar, vocals (live)

== Discography ==
=== Albums ===
- Panama (2006)
- Where Are You, Bambi Woods? (2008)
- I Can't Keep Track of Each Fallen Robin (2012)
- A Wolf at the Door (2016)
- December (2017)
- Clutter, Volume 1 (2020)

=== EPs ===
- Rumor Had It (2004)

=== Singles ===
- "Swim with Sam" (2006)
- "Fortune Teller" (2006)
- "Robin II" (2007)
- "Mary Had A Secret" (2008)
- "Superman Can't Move His Legs" (2008)
- "Oh, California" (2010)
- "Karaoke Night" (2012)
- "A Wolf At The Door" (2016)
- "Incompatible" (2016)
- "Mob Wife (Ft. Sam Bettens)" (2017)
- "Not Only During Christmas" (2017)
