= Try It Out =

Try It Out may refer to:

- Try It Out (Gino Soccio song)
- Try It Out (Skrillex and Alvin Risk song)
