= Almost Happy =

Almost Happy may refer to:

- Almost Happy (album), a 2000 album by K's Choice
- Almost Happy (TV series), an Argentinian comedy web television series
