= The Phantom Cowboy (album) =

Studio album by K's Choice
- Released: 5 February 2015
- Genre: Alternative rock
- Length: 30:28
- Labels: MPress Records (US/UK/CA/IE), Wallaby Records (EUR)
- Producer: Alain Johannes

K's Choice chronology
Echo Mountain (2010)	The Phantom Cowboy (2015)	Love = Music (2018)

The Phantom Cowboy is the sixth studio album by Belgian rock band K's Choice. The album was released on 5 February 2015 in much of Europe by Wallaby Records, LLC and distributed by Sony, and on 18 September 2015 in the US, UK, Canada, and Ireland by MPress Records.

== Music ==
Rather than develop music and lyrics individually and then bring them together as they had in past, siblings Sarah and Gert Bettens decided to write the music and lyrics together for this album. "We thought it would be fun to experiment with being in one room and feeding off each other," Sam explains. "It turned out to be a great decision." Alain Johannes produced the album.

On 6 February 2015, K's Choice released the first single, "Private Revolution". A teaser video for "Private Revolution" was released to YouTube on 5 February 2015.^{[3]} The video features concert and prior video footage. A video for the track "Bag of Concrete" was released on 12 June 2015. On 11 September 2015, a video for the track "Perfect Scar" was released on YouTube.

On 5 December 2015, Belgian concert hall, Ancienne Belgique, live-streamed K's Choice's concert at its venue.

In March 2016, K's Choice embarked on their first US tour in a decade in support of The Phantom Cowboy with longtime friends and, more recently, labelmates A Fragile Tomorrow.

== Track listing ==
All tracks are written by Sarah and Gert Bettens.

No.	Title	Length
1.	"As Rock & Roll As It Gets"	2:17
2.	"Woman"	2:32
3.	"Perfect Scar"	3:17
4.	"Private Revolution"	2:02
5.	"We Are the Universe"	3:16
6.	"The Phantom Cowboy"	3:36
7.	"Bag Full of Concrete"	3:14
8.	"Come Alive"	1:54
9.	"Gimme Real"	2:37
10.	"Down"	2:28
11.	"I Was Wrong About Everything"	2:55

== Chart performance ==
=== Weekly charts ===
Chart (2015)	Peak position
Belgian Albums (Ultratop Flanders)	3
Belgian Albums (Ultratop Wallonia)	28
Dutch Albums (Album Top 100)	12
French Albums (SNEP)	167

=== Year-end charts ===
Chart (2015)	Position
Belgian Albums (Ultratop Flanders)	72
