= Never Say Goodbye (Sam Bettens album) =

Live album by Sarah Bettens
- Released: 2008
- Genres: Pop, rock

Sarah Bettens chronology
Shine (2007)	Never Say Goodbye (2008)

Never Say Goodbye is a live album from Belgian musician Sarah Bettens. It was released in 2008 by Universal Music Group/Cocoon Records.

== Track listing ==
1. "I Can Do Better Than You" - 2:21
2. "Slow You Down" - 3:14)
3. "Cry Me a River" - 3:49 (Live Acoustic Theatre Version)
4. "Win Me Over" - 3:12
5. "Come over Here" - 4:07 (Live Acoustic Theatre Version)
6. "I Can't Make You Love Me" - 4:21 (Live)
7. "Go" - 3:56 (Live Acoustic Theatre Version)
8. "Scream" - 3:53 (Live Acoustic Theatre Version)
9. "Daddy's Gun" - 4:06 (Live Acoustic Theatre Version)
10. "Follow Me" - 4:18 (Live Acoustic Theatre Version)
11. "Not an Addict" - 5:20 (Live Acoustic Theatre Version)

== Charts ==
Chart performance for Never Say Goodbye
Chart (2008)	Peak position
Belgian Albums (Ultratop Flanders)	79
