= Guidone =

Guidone is an Italian surname. Notable people with the surname include:

- Marco Guidone (born 1986), Italian footballer
- Margaretha Guidone (born c. 1956), Belgian environmentalist
