= The Phantom Cowboy =

The Phantom Cowboy may refer to:

- The Phantom Cowboy (1935 film), an American western film
- The Phantom Cowboy (1941 film), an American western film
- The Phantom Cowboy (album), an album by K's Choice
