= Charlie Dée =

Dutch singer-songwriter

Renée van Dongen, professionally known as Charlie Dée (born 1977), is a Dutch singer-songwriter from Rotterdam. She won De Grote Prijs van Nederland in 2004 and released her debut album Where Do Girls Come From in 2006 and a year later Love Your Life followed. "Ten Thousand Times" (a digitally released single) is a duet with Huub van der Lubbe, lead singer of De Dijk. Charlie Dée can also be heard on a balladeer's second album Where Are You, Bambi Woods? (2008). In the summer of 2008 she did a small Joni Mitchell tribute tour.

== Discography ==
=== Albums ===
- Where Do Girls Come From (2006)
- Love Your Life (2007)
- A Tribute to Joni Mitchell (2009)
- Husbands and Wives (2010)

=== Singles ===
- Hello Hello (2006)
- One Way Ticket (2006)
- If I Ever Knew (2006)
- I Know (2007)
- Love Your Life (2007)
- Ten Thousand Times (2008) [Charlie Dée & Huub van der Lubbe]
- Have It All (2009)
- Have It All (DJ Tiësto Remix) (2011)

=== EP's ===
- A Tribute To Joni EP (2008)
