= I Quit (Hepburn song) =

1999 single by Hepburn

Single by Hepburn

from the album Hepburn
- B-side: "Sleeping Beauty"; "Butterfly"; "Cold World"
- Released: 17 May 1999
- Genre: Pop
- Length: 3:53
- Label: Columbia
- Songwriters: Phil Thornalley; Colin Campsie
- Producers: Phil Thornalley; Notodog

Hepburn singles chronology
"I Quit" (1999)	"Bugs" (1999)

"I Quit" is a song by British female pop band Hepburn. The song was written by Phil Thornalley, who produced the track alongside Notodog, and Colin Campsie. Included on Hepburn's debut and only studio album, Hepburn (1999), the song also appeared on the soundtrack to the American supernatural drama television series Buffy the Vampire Slayer.

"I Quit" was originally offered to Australian singer Natalie Imbruglia, who turned down the track. Hepburn recorded the song instead and released it as their debut single on 17 May 1999 through Columbia Records. Commercially, the song reached number eight on the UK Singles Chart and also charted in France, peaking at number 80. The song was released in the United States in October 1999 but failed to generate success.

== Release and reception ==
Columbia Records released "I Quit" in the United Kingdom on 17 May 1999. Critically, British trade paper Music Week compared the song's "angry" chorus to Alanis Morissette's music, noting the song's maturity and calling it "instantly catchy and hummable". UK chart columnist James Masterton wrote that the rhyming couplet "But you turned into another liar / And you came on like a new Messiah" was the "coolest" lyric of the 23 May 1999 chart week, when "I Quit" debuted at its peak of number eight on the UK Singles Chart. The song remained on the UK chart for nine weeks and is Hepburn's only top-10 single.

In June 1999, Hepburn promoted the song by performing it live on music programme Top of the Pops. In the United States, TVT Records serviced "I Quit" to rock radio stations on 5 October 1999, but it did not experience success. In mid-2000, the song charted on the French Singles Chart for two nonconsecutive weeks, peaking at number 80 that May.

== Track listings ==
UK CD1

1. "I Quit" – 3:53
2. "Sleeping Beauty" – 3:20
3. "Butterfly" – 3:34

UK CD2

1. "I Quit" – 3:53
2. "Cold World" – 5:35
3. "I Quit" (Dave Sears 'On Time Mix') – 7:38

UK cassette single

1. "I Quit" – 3:53
2. "Sleeping Beauty" – 3:20

European CD single

1. "I Quit" – 3:53
2. "Butterfly" – 3:34

Australian CD single

1. "I Quit" – 3:53
2. "Sleeping Beauty" – 3:20
3. "Cold World" – 5:35
4. "I Quit" (Dave Sears 'On Time Mix') – 7:38

== Personnel ==
Personnel are lifted from the Australian CD single liner notes.

- Phil Thornalley – writing, production
- Colin Campsie – writing
- Notodog – production
- Dave Bascombe – mixing
- Simon Fowler – photography

== Charts ==
=== Weekly charts ===
Chart (1999–2000)	Peak position
Europe (Eurochart Hot 100)	38
France (SNEP)	80
Scotland Singles (OCC)	8
UK Singles (OCC)	8

=== Year-end charts ===
Chart (1999)	Position
UK Singles (OCC)	162

== Release history ==
Region	Date	Format(s)	Label(s)	Ref.
United Kingdom	17 May 1999	CD; cassette	Columbia	
United States	5 October 1999	Mainstream rock; active rock; alternative radio	TVT	
