= Outline (album) =

Studio album by Gino Soccio
- Released: 1979
- Recorded: 1979
- Venue: Montreal
- Genre: Disco
- Label: RFC/Warner Bros.
- Producer: Mix Machine

Gino Soccio chronology
Outline (1979)	S-Beat (1980)

Singles from Outline
- 1. "The Visitors" Released: 1979; 2. "Dancer" Released: 1979; 3. "Dance To Dance" Released: 1979

Professional ratings
Review scores
Source	Rating
AllMusic	2/5 stars

Outline is the debut album by Gino Soccio, released in 1979 on RFC Records, a Warner Bros. Records disco subsidiary run by Ray Caviano.

The album peaked at No. 79 on the US Billboard 200 and No. 12 in Canada. "Dancer" is Soccio's only Billboard Hot 100 entry, peaking at No. 48, and his first No. 1 hit on the Disco Top 80 chart.

== Track listing ==
All songs are written by Gino Soccio.

Side A
No.	Title	Length
1.	"Dancer"	8:35
2.	"So Lonely"	2:00
3.	"The Visitors"	6:37

Side B
No.	Title	Length
4.	"Dance to Dance"	7:13
5.	"There's A Woman"	8:30

== Personnel ==
- Gino Soccio – vocals, keyboards, drums, guitar
- Busta Jones – vocals, bass
- Heather Gauthier – vocals
- Julia Gilmore – vocals
- Laurie Niedzielski – vocals
- Sharon Lee Williams – vocals
- Al McNeil – bass
- Mark Hygden – drums
- Terry Martell – drums
- Carlyle Miller – flute, horns (4)
- Walter Rossi – guitar
- Richard Mortimer – horns
- Roger Walls – horns
- Yoram Levy – horns
- Luc Boivin – percussion
- Stanley Brown – synthesizer (1, 2, 4 and 5)

Production

- Producer: Mix Machine
- Engineer: Lindsay Kidd, Jose Bunting, Pierre Groulx
- Art direction and illustration: Greg Porto

== Charts ==
Weekly

Year	Chart	Position
1979	Canada RPM Top Albums	12
1979	US Billboard 200	79
1979	US Billboard Top Soul Albums	34
1979	Australia	78

Year-end

Year	Chart	Position
1979	Canada RPM Top Albums	75

Singles

Year	Single	Chart	Position
1979	"Dancer"	Canada RPM Top Singles	6
1979	"Dancer"	US Billboard Hot 100	48
1979	"Dancer"	US Billboard Hot Soul Singles	60
1979	"Dancer"	US Billboard Disco Top 80	1 (Note: Back-to-back with Dance to Dance.)
1979	"Dancer"	UK Singles	46
