= Dancer (Gino Soccio song) =

Single by Gino Soccio

from the album Outline
- B-side: "So Lonely"
- Released: 1979
- Recorded: 1979
- Genre: Eurodisco; italo disco
- Length: 3:30 (single version); 8:23 (album & 12" version)
- Label: RFC/Warner Bros.
- Songwriter: Gino Soccio
- Producer: Mix Machine

Gino Soccio singles chronology
"The Visitors" (1978)	"Dancer" (1979)	"Dance To Dance" (1979)

Dancer is a song by Gino Soccio. It was released as a single in 1979 from his album Outline.

The song was #1 on the Billboard Disco chart and remained on that spot for six weeks. It was also Soccio's only Billboard Hot 100 entry, peaking at No. 48, and his only Top 10 hit on his home country's RPM Top Singles chart, peaking at No. 6.

== Background ==
The song was part of the playlist at New York City disco Paradise Garage, in an extended mix by DJ Larry Levan. “They would play that song three times in a row sometimes, and it was already an eight-minute song," Soccio told Wax Poetics in a 2013 career retrospective interview. "It was twenty-four minutes of ‘Dancer,’ and people just would not get enough of it. It really was something. It blew me away.”

The song was released in Canada on the Celebration label.

== Chart performance ==
Chart (1979)	Peak position
Canada RPM Top Singles	6
US Billboard Hot 100	48
US Billboard Hot Soul Singles	60
US Billboard Disco Top 80	1
UK Singles	46

== Legacy ==
During Pride Month 2022, "Dancer" was selected by Jezebel as #22 in their list of "69 of the Best Disco Songs of All Time."

The song was featured as background music in the club scene of the 1979 film "Suhaag".
