= Ken Roberson (choreographer) =

American choreographer and dancer (born 1956)

- Born: Kenneth L. Roberson; 1956 (age 68–69); Thomson, Georgia
- Occupation(s): Choreographer, dancer, professor, director
- Known for: Avenue Q

Kenneth L. Roberson (born 1956 in Thomson, Georgia) is an American choreographer and dancer best known for his work on Avenue Q.

== Early life and career ==
Roberson was born in Thomson, Georgia. He was an undergraduate at the Henry Grady School of Journalism at the University of Georgia when he saw a local dance troupe performing and resolved to become a dancer. In 1979, he graduated with a degree in journalism and got a job at the Athens Banner-Herald. He later quit his job for a chance to audition at the Alvin Ailey American Dance Theater. He attended the school for two years before joining dance-pop group Fantasy. He studied tap dancing under Henry LeTang who told him about the upcoming Paris premiere of Black and Blue. He went on to make his Broadway debut in the musical's American version in 1989. He danced in the 1990 revival of Oh, Kay! and in Jelly's Last Jam, a musical about the life of Jelly Roll Morton. In 1998 he did the musical staging for John Leguizamo's one-man play Freak. Ken also was nominated for an Emmy Award for best choreography for Mr. Lequizamo's sketch comedy series House of Buggin' for Fox TV. This led to a job choreographing the 2000 US tour of The Civil War. He choreographed the Off-Broadway and Broadway versions of Avenue Q. In 2009 he choreographed Colman Domingo's one-man show A Boy and His Soul. Kenneth is director of ETHEL written and performed by Terry Burrell.

He is Professor of Practice, Theatre, Drama and Contemporary Dance at Indiana University.

== Work ==
=== Dancer ===
- 1985 Black and Blue (European premiere)
- 1988 Sophisticated Ladies (European tour)
- 1989 Black and Blue (Broadway premiere)
- 1990 Oh, Kay! (1990 Broadway revival)
- 1992 Jelly's Last Jam

=== Choreographer ===
- 1996 A Brief History of White Music
- 1996 In Walks Ed
- 1998 Freak (Musical staging)
- 2000 The Civil War
- 2000 Show Boat
- 2000 Cinderella
- 2001 Guys and Dolls
- 2002 Harlem Song
- 2003 Ain't Misbehavin'
- 2003 Jar The Floor
- 2003 Avenue Q
- 2003 Great Joy!
- 2004 Drowning Crow
- 2005 The Color Purple (Alliance Theater world premiere)
- 2005 All Shook Up
- 2007 Ray Charles Live!
- 2009 A Boy and His Soul

=== Film and television ===
- 1995 House of Buggin' (TV)
- 1998 Freak
- 2005 Lackawanna Blues (TV)
- 2004 Brother to Brother
- 2005 Preaching to the Choir

== Awards ==
- 1995 Nominated for Primetime Emmy Award for Outstanding Choreography - House of Buggin'
- 2003 Nominated for Lucille Lortel Award for Outstanding Choreographer - Avenue Q
- 2004 Nominated for Lucille Lortel Awards and Drama Desk Awards for Outstanding Choreographer - George C. Wolfe's Harlem Song
- 2009 Nominated for Lucille Lortel Award for Outstanding Choreographer - A Boy and His Soul
