= Miracles (Change album) =

Studio album by Change
- Released: March 6, 1981
- Studios: Fonoprint, Bologna, Italy; Mediasound, New York City
- Genres: R&B, soul, post-disco
- Length: 34:16
- Labels: RFC Records, Atlantic, WEA, Goody Music Records
- Producers: Jacques Fred Petrus, Mauro Malavasi

Change chronology
The Glow of Love (1980)	Miracles (1981)	Sharing Your Love (1982)

Singles from Miracles
- 1. "Paradise" b/w "Your Move" Released: April 1981; 2. ""Hold Tight" b/w "Stop for Love" Released: July 1981; 3. "Heaven of My Life" b/w "Miracles" Released: October 1981

Miracles is the second studio album by the Italian/U.S. ensemble Change. It was released in 1981 and reached number forty-six on the US Billboard Album Chart and nine on the US Billboard Black Albums chart. Miracles includes the singles "Paradise", "Hold Tight", "Your Move", "Heaven of My Life", "Stop for Love" (in the UK only) and "Miracles".

The band recorded the songs for the album at Fonoprint Studios in Bologna, Italy. The songs were then taken to Mediasound Studios in New York City for the recording of the vocals. The sessions were mastered at Sterling Sound Studios. The album was originally released as an LP in March 1981. The artwork was designed by Greg Porto.

== Reception ==
Professional ratings
Review scores
Source	Rating
AllMusic	4/5 stars
Robert Christgau	B+

Miracles received positive reviews from the majority of critics. Italian writer Rocco Bargioni describes the track Hold Tight as "pleasant, light and stylish. Even a little bit funky. You can put it on your headphones while you walk, and even the industrial area of your city will seem like a nice place".

== Track listing ==
Side one
No.	Title	Writer(s)	Length
1.	"Paradise"	David Romani, Mauro Malavasi, Tanyayette Willoughby	5:14
2.	"Hold Tight"	David Romani, Mauro Malavasi, Paul Slade	4:23
3.	"Your Move"	David Romani, Mauro Malavasi, Paul Slade	4:23
4.	"Stop for Love"	Mauro Malavasi, Paul Slade, Tanyayette Willoughby	4:12

Side two
No.	Title	Writer(s)	Length
5.	"On Top"	Mauro Malavasi, Paolo Gianolio, Tanyayette Willoughby	5:13
6.	"Heaven of My Life"	David Romani, Mauro Malavasi, Paolo Gianolio, Tanyayette Willoughby	5:34
7.	"Miracles"	Mauro Malavasi, Tanyayette Willoughby	5:17

== Personnel ==
Change

- James "Crab" Robinson - lead vocals
- Diva Gray - lead vocals, solo vocals, background vocals
- Paolo Gianolio - guitar
- Doc Powell - guitar
- David Romani - bass guitar
- Rudy Trevisi - saxophone
- Onaje Allan Grumbs - keyboards
- Maurizio Biancani - assistant synthesizer
- Terry Silverlight - drums
- Jocelyn Shaw, Luther Vandross, Krystal Davis, Dennis Collins - background vocals

Additional musicians

- Mauro Malavasi - piano, synthesizer
- Victor Paz - trumpet
- Earl Gardiner - trumpet
- Denny Trimboli - saxophone
- Bob Alexander - trombone
- The Goody Music String Ensemble - strings
- Gordon Grody - solo vocals
- Ullanda McCullough, Fonzi Thornton, Benny Diggs - background vocals

Technical

- Jacques Fred Petrus and Mauro Malavasi - producer, executive producer (for Little Macho Music Co., Inc., New York)
- David Romani, Mauro Malavasi and Paolo Gianolio - composing, arrangements, conducting
- Tanyayette Willoughby - vocal conducting
- Jocelyn Shaw - vocal conducting, lyrics
- Paul Slade - lyrics
- Maurizio Biancani - engineering (Fonoprint Studios)
- Michael H. Brauer - engineering (Fonoprint and Mediasound Studios)
- Andy Hoffman - assistant engineer (Mediasound Studios)
- Greg Calbi - engineer (Sterling Sound)
- Greg Porto - art and design

== Charts ==
Chart (1981)	Peak position
U.S. Billboard Pop Albums	46
U.S. Billboard Black Albums	9

== Sampling ==
- French house duo Le Knight Club sampled parts of this song for their two songs, "Hysteria" and "Hysteria II"
- The elements of this song was sampled by VANTAGE //, Who made the track "Happiness Deluxe" from the 'Metro City' album.
- House Producer Les Années Folles sampled parts for his song 'Yacht'
- Shook sampled elements of "Hold Tight" for his single, "Hold Tight" from his EP, "The Rise and Fall EP" released in 2011
