= Panama (album) =

Studio album by A Balladeer
- Released: 2006
- Genre: Alternative rock
- Length: 44:49
- Label: EMI

Panama is the debut album by A Balladeer, released in 2006. It peaked at No. 30 on the Dutch Albums Chart and No. 12 on the Alternative Chart.

== Track listing ==
All songs written by Marinus de Goederen unless otherwise noted.

1. "Summer" - 3:49
2. "Blank" - 3:42
3. "All I Wanted" - 4:38
4. "Pre-Berlin" - 3:56
5. "Sirens" - 3:33
6. "Winterschläfer" - 3:48
7. "Robin II" - 6:22
8. "Fortune Teller" - 3:14
9. "Hamburg" - 1:21
10. "Copper Shades" - 3:25
11. "Swim with Sam" - 4:26
12. "Herbst" - 2:35
