= Buffy the Vampire Slayer: The Album =

Soundtrack album by Various Artists
- Released: 19 October 1999
- Genre: Television Soundtrack
- Length: 65:11
- Label: TVT Records
- Producer: Patricia Joseph; Joss Whedon

Buffy the Vampire Slayer: The Album is a soundtrack album featuring music from the Buffy the Vampire Slayer TV series.

The album is made up mostly of tracks by little-known artists, though some better known ones, such as Garbage and Alison Krauss, are also featured. A small part of the television show's original score is also included. Although the album was released in 1999, it contains music from Buffy's first four seasons, although a few songs never appeared in an episode at all.

A follow-up, Buffy the Vampire Slayer: Radio Sunnydale – Music from the TV Series, was released in 2003.

== Track listing ==
1. Nerf Herder – "Buffy the Vampire Slayer Theme" (the recorded version used from "Anne" onwards)
2. Guided by Voices – "Teenage FBI"
3. Garbage – "Temptation Waits"
4. Velvet Chain – "Strong" (from "Never Kill a Boy on the First Date")
5. Hepburn – "I Quit"
6. Furslide – "Over My Head"
7. Bif Naked – "Lucky" (from "The Harsh Light of Day")
8. Black Lab – "Keep Myself Awake" (from "The I in Team")
9. K's Choice – "Virgin State of Mind" (from "Doppelgangland")
10. Superfine – "Already Met You" (from "Teacher's Pet")
11. Face to Face – "The Devil You Know (God Is a Man)" (from "Where the Wild Things Are")
12. Kim Ferron – "Nothing But You" (from "Beer Bad")
13. Alison Krauss and Union Station – "It Doesn't Matter" (from "When She Was Bad")
14. The Sundays – "Wild Horses" (from "The Prom")
15. Four Star Mary – "Pain" (Slayer Mix) (from "Bewitched, Bothered and Bewildered", "Dead Man's Party" and "Living Conditions")
16. Splendid – "Charge" (from "I Only Have Eyes for You")
17. Rasputina – "Transylvanian Concubine" (from "Surprise")
18. Christophe Beck – "Close Your Eyes" (Buffy/Angel Love Theme) (from "Becoming, Part 2")

== Certifications and sales ==
Region	Certification	Certified units/sales
France (SNEP)	Gold	100,000^{*}
United Kingdom (BPI)	Gold	100,000^{^}
United States	—	212,000
^{*} Sales figures based on certification alone.^{^} Shipments figures based on certification alone.
