= Paradise in Me =

Studio album by K's Choice
- Released: 29 September 1995
- Recorded: 1995
- Studios: Jet Studio, Brussels; Galaxy Studios, Mol; Synsound Studios, Brussels
- Genres: Alternative rock; post-grunge; folk
- Length: 53:42
- Labels: Double T Music; 550 Music
- Producer: Jean Blaute

K's Choice chronology
| The Great Subconscious Club (1994) | Paradise in Me (1995) | Cocoon Crash (1998) |

Professional ratings
Review scores
| Source | Rating |
|---|---|
| Allmusic | 4/5 stars |

Paradise in Me is the second studio album by Belgian band K's Choice. It was released in 1995 by Double T Music. In the United States, it was released on 20 August 1996 by 550 Music.

The album reached #121 on the U.S. Billboard 200 chart. Six singles were released from the album: "A Sound that Only You Can Hear," "Mr. Freeze," "Not an Addict," "Wait," "Dad," and "Iron Flower." "Not an Addict" reached #5 on the U.S. Modern Rock Tracks chart.

== Track listing ==
All songs were written by Gert and Sam (as Sarah) Bettens.

| No. | Title | Length |
|---|---|---|
| 1. | "Not an Addict" | 4:49 |
| 2. | "A Sound That Only You Can Hear" | 4:13 |
| 3. | "White Kite Fauna" | 4:59 |
| 4. | "Mr Freeze" | 4:27 |
| 5. | "Song For Catherine" | 3:03 |
| 6. | "To This Day" | 4:13 |
| 7. | "Iron Flower" | 4:34 |
| 8. | "Wait" | 5:07 |
| 9. | "Paradise in Me" | 2:05 |
| 10. | "My Record Company" | 3:42 |
| 11. | "Only Dreaming" | 3:53 |
| 12. | "Dad" | 3:04 |
| 13. | "Old Woman" | 1:55 |
| 14. | "Something's Wrong" | 3:43 |
| Total length: | | 53:47 |

Notes

- "To This Day" contains an interpolation from Julio Cortázar's book Hopscotch.

== Credits and personnel ==
- Sarah Bettens - Vocals, songwriter, composer
- Gert Bettens - Guitar, keyboards, backing vocals, songwriter, composer, drawing
- Jean Blaute - Bass guitar, guitar, keyboards, producer
- Alain Van Zeveren - Arranger
- David Haas - Voices
- Kevin Mulligan - Pedal steel guitar
- Vincent Pierins - Bass guitar
- Evert Verhees - Bass guitar
- Erik Verheyden - Bass guitar
- Bart Van Der Zeeuw - Percussion, backing vocals, drums
- Werner Pensaert - Engineer
- Tony Platt - Engineer
- Uwe Teichart - Editing, mastering
- Marc Braspenning - Photography
- Jurgen Rogiers - Photography

== Charts ==
| Chart (1996–97) | Peak position |
|---|---|
| Belgian Albums (Ultratop Flanders) | 1 |
| Belgian Albums (Ultratop Wallonia) | 13 |
| Dutch Albums (Album Top 100) | 10 |
| French Albums (SNEP) | 25 |
| US Billboard 200 | 121 |

== Certifications ==
| Region | Certification | Certified units/sales |
|---|---|---|
| Belgium (BRMA) | Gold | 25,000^{*} |
| Netherlands (NVPI) | Platinum | 100,000^{^} |
^{*} Sales figures based on certification alone.^{^} Shipments figures based on certification alone.
