= Giant Steps (band) =

- Also known as: The Quick
- Origin: England
- Genres: Pop
- Years active: 1988–1990
- Labels: A&M
- Past members: Colin "Col" Campsie; George McFarlane

Giant Steps was a pop duo from England that consisted of vocalist/producer Colin Campsie and bassist/keyboardist/producer George McFarlane. They had previously recorded as the Quick.

Giant Steps' only album, The Book of Pride, was released in 1988, and its first single "Another Lover" became a hit in the United States, peaking at No. 13 on the Billboard Hot 100. It became very popular in Italy in 1988 as well, garnering considerable airplay on pop radio. It was subsequently featured over the opening credits of the 1989 film Loverboy, starring Patrick Dempsey.

Giant Steps' follow-up single "Into You" was a modest US chart success, reaching No. 58 in early 1989.

In 2006, Campsie became infamous for writing the Kandy Floss record, and was mistakenly credited as being a member of Go West by Mr. Holy Moly in Metro's 25 February edition.

== Band members ==
- Colin Campsie - vocals, production
- George McFarlane - keyboards, guitars, production

with

- Gardner Cole - keyboards, vocals, composer, arranger, producer
- Edie Lehmann - backgrounds
- Bruce Gaitsch - guitars
- David Boruff - saxophone

== Discography ==
=== Albums ===
- The Book of Pride (1988) (A&M Records AMA 5190)

=== Singles ===
- "Another Lover" (1988) - US #13
- "The Book of Pride" (1988)
- "Into You" (1989)
