= Try It Out (Gino Soccio song) =

Single by Gino Soccio

from the album Closer
- A-side: "Try It Out (Vocal - Long Version)"
- B-side: "Try It Out (Vocal - Short Version)"
- Released: April 1981
- Genre: funk
- Length: 6:14
- Label: Atlantic
- Songwriter: Gino Soccio

"Try It Out" is a 1981 funk single by the Montreal-based singer, Gino Soccio. From the album, Closer, "Try It Out" along with the track, "Hold Tight" hit number one on the dance chart for six weeks and was the top hit on the dance play chart for the year. "Try It Out" also reached number twenty-two on the soul singles chart.

It was released in Canada in a 12" format on Celebration CEL 7 in 1981.

== Chart positions ==
Chart (1981)	Peak position
Italy (FIMI)	13
U.S. Billboard Hot Dance Club Play	1
U.S. Billboard Hot Black Singles	22

== See also ==
- List of number-one dance singles of 1981 (U.S.)
