= Gino Soccio =

Canadian disco record producer

- Born: September 9, 1955 (age 71); Westmount, Quebec, Canada
- Genres: Disco, funk, post-disco
- Occupations: Record producer, songwriter
- Years active: 1977–present
- Labels: Celebration, Warner Bros., RFC, Atlantic

Gino Soccio (born September 27, 1955) is a Canadian disco music producer based in Montreal. His only US Billboard Hot 100 entry was the #48 hit single "Dancer" in 1979, but he did hit #1 on the US Hot Dance Music/Club Play chart twice ("Dancer" / "Dance to Dance" in 1979, and "Try It Out" / "Hold Tight" in 1981, six weeks each). "Dancer" peaked at #46 in the UK Singles Chart in May 1979. Soccio's third biggest hit, "It's Alright" / "Look at Yourself", from his album, Face to Face, reached #2 for 5 weeks also on the Hot Dance Music/Club Play chart. "Turn It Around" was released only as a single in 1984.

== Early life ==
Soccio was born in Verdun, Quebec, of Italian descent. He told Wax Poetics in 2013 that he started playing piano at eight and was playing Bach sonatas by eleven. In the early 1970s, he was influenced by electronic musicians Kraftwerk, Stockhausen, and Wendy Carlos and started renting synths, becoming a sought-after Montreal keyboard specialist.

== Career ==
Soccio got his start in disco when Montreal producer Pat Deserio called him in 1975 and asked if he would play keyboards and help compose for the Kébekélektrik album. Prior to this, Soccio was working as a local session musician.

Deserio asked Soccio to make a disco version of Ravel's "Bolero," which he wanted to release with filler tracks under the fictitious act name Kébekélektrik, a Kraftwerk-influenced misspelling of "Quebec Electric." In reality, Soccio played every note. "It was very labor-intensive," Soccio later said, "but at the same time, I had free rein of the entire studio, which had never happened [before]. It was a really great learning experience. I had never done disco. As you're going along doing it, you fall right in love with it." The Kébekélektrik sessions produced his B-side composition "War Dance," described by Wax Poetics' Jered Stuffco as "an orgy of analog squirts and electronic flourishes that Soccio wrote and recorded on the spot, warts and all."

The four-song LP Kébekélektrik was remixed by Tom Moulton and released in the U.S. on Salsoul in 1978.

The Kébekélektrik album helped to launch Soccio's career. In Canada, the Kébekélektrik song "Magic Fly" reached number 69 on the pop charts, October 8, 1977. It reached #9 on the Billboard disco chart, released on the TK Disco label before the album. "War Dance" subsequently became a hit on U.S. dance floors, a song Soccio himself had deemed "filler". It also reached #9 on Billboard's disco chart.

In 1978, Soccio released a dance single, "The Visitors", which was later remixed by Ouimet. It later charted on Billboard's disco chart in 1980. He also played keyboards on the Bombers' 1978 album Bombers.

His debut solo album "Outline" was released in 1979 and contained the hit "Dancer"; the album received critical acclaim and brought him international recognition.

In 1979, Soccio also recorded a disco album with Guy Lafleur which cost CAD$100 000 to produce.

In the UK, he received airplay from Robbie Vincent on BBC Radio London, and Greg Edwards on Capital Radio on imported RFC Records, a subsidiary of Warner Bros. Records.

He also assembled and produced the disco studio group, Witch Queen, best known for their hits, "Bang a Gong" / "All Right Now" (1979), covers of the songs by T.Rex and Free. Together they peaked at number eight on the US Hot Dance/Disco chart.

== Discography ==
Gino Soccio discography
- Studio albums: 4
- Compilation albums: 3
- Singles: 17

The discography of Gino Soccio consists of four studio albums, three compilations and seventeen singles.

Studio albums

Year	Title	Chart positions			
Year	Title	CAN	US	US R&B	AUS
1979	Outline: Labels: Celebration, RFC Records/Warner Bros. Records	12	79	34	78
1980	S-Beat: Labels: Celebration, RFC/Warner Bros.	–	–	–	–
1981	Closer: Labels: Celebration, RFC/Atlantic Records	–	96	26	–
1982	Face to Face: Labels: Celebration, RFC/Atlantic	–	–	45	–
"–" denotes releases that did not chart or were not released in that territory.

Compilation albums

- Remember (1984, Celebration)
- Greatest Hits (1989, Unidisc)
- The Best of Gino Soccio (1994, Unidisc)

Singles

Year	Title	Chart positions					Album
Year	Title	CAN	US BB	US Dance	US R&B	UK	Album
1977	"Sauve Qui Peut"	–	–	–	–	–	
1978	"The Visitors"	–	–	27	–	–	Outline
1979	"Dancer"	6	48	1	60	46	Outline
1979	"Dance to Dance"	–	–	1	–	–	Outline
1980	"S-Beat"	–	–	-	–	–	S-Beat
1980	"Heartbreaker"	–	–	4	–	–	S-Beat
1981	"Try It Out"	–	103	1	22	–	Closer
1981	"Hold Tight"	–	–	1	–	–	Closer
1982	"It's Alright"	–	108	2	60	–	Face to Face
1982	"Remember"	–	–	-	–	–	Face to Face
1982	"You Move Me"	–	–	-	–	–	Face to Face
1983	"Get It Up"	–	–	–	–	–	
1984	"Turn It Around"	–	–	20	–	–	Remember
1984	"Out of My Life"	–	–	–	–	–	Remember
1985	"Human Nature"	–	–	50^{[A]}	–	–	Remember
1985	"Temptation Eyes"	–	–	–	–	–	Remember
1986	"Magic"	–	–	–	–	–	
1988	"Love the One You're With"	79	–	–	–	–	
"–" denotes releases that did not chart or were not released in that territory.

Notes

- A"Human Nature" actually charted at #50 on Billboard Dance/Electronic Singles Sales chart.

== See also ==
- List of number-one dance hits (United States)
- List of artists who reached number one on the US Dance chart
