= Voggue =

Voggue was a female disco vocal duo from Canada composed of Chantal Condor and Angela Songui. The group recorded two albums and released a number of singles, including "Love Buzz" and "Dancin' the Night Away", which appeared on the US dance music charts.

== History ==
In 1980, the duo released its first self-titled album, which contains the singles "Love Buzz", "Here We Are" and their most successful single, "Dancin' the Night Away", on the Celsius label. While the singles were well received, some of the other tracks on the album were criticized as less polished and lacking in energy.

In 1981, their most successful single, "Dancin' the Night Away", written by Denis LePage, spent three weeks at #1 on the Hot Dance Club Play chart in the U.S., it hit #109 in the Bubbling Under chart. It also reached #39 on the UK Singles Chart. It also hit #4 in Belgium, the follow up "Movin' Up" reached #35 in Belgium.

In 1983, a second album was released on Matra Records, containing the singles "I Love to Dance" and "Sun Struck Lovers". Voggue disbanded in 1984.

== In popular culture ==
The play Coming Clean, by Kevin Elyot, includes a scene in which "Dancin' the Night Away" plays in the background.

== See also ==
- List of number-one dance hits (United States)
- List of artists who reached number one on the US Dance chart
