= Another Lover =

Single by Giant Steps

from the album The Book of Pride
- B-side: "Adrenalin"
- Released: 1988
- Length: 4:03 (single version); 4:13 (album version)
- Label: A&M
- Songwriter(s): Colin Campsie, Gardner Cole, George McFarlane
- Producer(s): Gardner Cole

Giant Steps singles chronology
"Another Lover" (1988)	"Into You" (1989)

"Another Lover", sometimes titled "(The World Don't Need) Another Lover", is a 1988 song by English duo Giant Steps, from their debut album The Book of Pride. Written by vocalist Colin Campsie, bassist/keyboardist George McFarlane and record producer Gardner Cole, the song was a top 20 hit single in the United States.

== Release and reception ==
Released in the middle of 1988, "Another Lover" peaked at number 13 on the U.S. Billboard Hot 100 in November. In addition, the single peaked at number 13 on the Singles Sales chart, number 12 on the Hot 100 Airplay chart, and number 25 on the Adult Contemporary chart.

Due to the success of "Another Lover" in the U.S., Giant Steps joined a wave of British acts at the time, including Breathe, Scarlett and Black and the Escape Club, who became "American pop stars" before being exported "back for re-release in Britain." McFarlane said of the single's UK re-release, "Already, we are noticing a better reaction to the record this time around." He added, "It's getting more air play, and the general vibe is a bit better—all because it was a hit in America." It did not however chart in the UK.

AllMusic writer William Cooper described the song as "a catchy piece of dance/pop fluff." The song was featured as the opening track to the 1989 comedy film Loverboy starring Patrick Dempsey.

== Track listing ==
7" vinyl (UK, US, Canada)

1. "Another Lover" - 4:03
2. "Adrenalin" - 4:39

12" vinyl (US, Canada)

1. "Another Lover" (12" dance mix) - 7:45
2. "Another Lover" (7" edit - new bass) - 4:12
3. "Another Lover" (house dub) - 7:27
4. "Another Lover" (LP version) - 4:13

== Chart performance ==
Chart (1988)	Peak position
U.S. Billboard Hot 100	13
U.S. Billboard Hot Dance Club Play	10
U.S. Billboard Adult Contemporary	25
U.S. Cash Box Top 100 Singles	12
