= Hold Tight (Change song) =

Single by Change

from the album Miracles
- B-side: "Stop For Love"
- Released: 1981
- Recorded: Recorded at Fonoprint Studios, Bologna, All vocals recorded and mixed at Mediasound Studios, New York City. Mastered at Sterling Sound Inc., New York City, 1981
- Genre: Boogie, Funk, R&B, Pop
- Length: 4:23; 3:43 (Short Version)
- Label: Atlantic
- Songwriters: Davide Romani, Mauro Malavasi, Paul Slade
- Producers: Jacques Fred Petrus, Mauro Malavasi

Change singles chronology
| "Paradise" (1981) | "Hold Tight" (1981) | "Heaven of My Life" (1981) |

"Hold Tight" produced by Mauro Malavasi who takes care of the arrangements. is a 1981 single by Change from the LP entitled Miracles. The single's vocals were sung by Diva Gray. Along with the songs "Paradise" and "Heaven of My Life", it became a number one single on the US dance chart for five weeks. It was also the second single released from "Miracles," as "Hold Tight" peaked at number 40 on Billboard's Soul Chart, and number 89 on the Billboard Hot 100.

== Reception ==
Italian writer Rocco Bargioni in his book In pista! describes the track as "pleasant, light and stylish. Even a little bit funky. You can put it on your headphones while you walk, and even the industrial area of your city will seem like a nice place".

== Track listing ==
7" Single

- A Hold Tight 3:43
- B Stop For Love 3:50

12" Single

- A Hold Tight (Vocal / Long Version) 4:23
- B Hold Tight (Vocal / Short Version) 3:43

== Chart positions ==
| Chart (1981) | Peak position |
|---|---|
| U.S. Billboard Hot 100 | 89 |
| U.S. Billboard Hot Dance Club Play | 1 |
| U.S. Billboard Hot R&B/Hip-Hop Songs | 40 |
