= Margaretha Guidone =

Margaretha Guidone (born c. 1956) is a housewife from Helmond (the Netherlands) living in Kapellen (Belgium) who became famous in Flanders because of her campaign for the environment and against global warming. She successfully urged politicians to go see the new climate documentary by Al Gore, An Inconvenient Truth. 200 politicians and political staff accepted her invitation, among whom were Belgian prime minister Guy Verhofstadt and Minister-President of Flanders, Yves Leterme.

Belgian federal minister of environment Bruno Tobback donated his speech time at the climate conference in Nairobi, Kenya to her. She addressed the conference on 15 November 2006, but was unsuccessful at drawing much attention, for the international press didn't pay much attention to her. Since then, she cancelled her year-long Groen! membership in favor of Tobback's Different Socialist Party and published a book.
