= Fantasy (group) =

American vocal group from New York

- Origin: New York City, United States
- Genres: Dance-pop, pop, boogie, post-disco
- Labels: Pavilion/Epic
- Past members: Ken Roberson; Carolyn Edwards; Rufus Jackson; Tamm E Hunt

Fantasy is an urban pop vocal group based in New York City who scored several hits on the Hot Dance Music/Club Play chart, including "You're Too Late", which hit number one in 1981.

Group members included Ken Roberson, Tamm E Hunt, Rufus Jackson and Carolyn Edwards. The group's producer, Tony Valor, continued to use the name in 1985 when they released an Italo disco-influenced single called "He's My Number One".

== History ==
"You're Too Late" was a number-one dance hit in the United States. It had a five-week reign at the top of the Billboard Hot Dance Club Play chart in early 1981. It also reached the top 30 on the Soul Singles chart.

In 1982, the band released a pop-soul number entitled "Hold On Tight", which peaked at number 35 on the Dance Club chart, and #1 on the 1982 Billboard Year End Award followed by "Live the Life I Love", boogie song that had reached number 41 on the same chart by 1983.

Their last successful track titled "He's Number One" reached number 37 on the Dance chart in 1986.

== Discography ==
=== Studio albums ===
Album	Year	Label
Fantasy	1981	Pavilion
Sex and Material Possessions	1982	Pavilion

=== Singles ===
Year	Single	Peak chart positions			
Year	Single	US	US Dance	US R&B	US DSS
1981	"(Hey Who's Gotta) Funky Song"	—	—	51	—
1981	"You're Too Late"	104	1	28	—
1982	"Hold on Tight"	—	35	—	—
1983	"Live the Life I Love"	—	41	—	—
1986	"He's Number One"	—	37	—	14
"—" denotes releases that did not chart

== See also ==
- List of number-one dance hits (United States)
- List of artists who reached number one on the US Dance chart
