= Paradise (Change song) =

Single by Change

from the album Miracles
- B-side: "Your Love"
- Released: 1981
- Studio: Fonoprint Studios, Bologna, Mediasound, New York City (vocals); Sterling Sound (New York City) (mastering)
- Genre: Post-disco, R&B, soul
- Length: 5:14; 3:57 (Short Version)
- Label: Atlantic
- Songwriters: Davide Romani, Mauro Malavasi, Tanyayette Willoughby
- Producers: Jacques Fred Petrus, Mauro Malavasi

Change singles chronology
"The Glow of Love" (1980)	"Paradise" (1981)	"Hold Tight" (1981)

"Paradise" produced by Mauro Malavasi who takes care of the arrangements. is a song by Change, released as a single in 1981. It is from the group's second album Miracles. The song's vocals were sung by James Robinson and Diva Gray. Along with the songs "Hold Tight" and "Heaven of My Life", it became a number one single on the US dance chart for five weeks. "Paradise" crossed over to the soul chart, peaking at number seven, and it also reached number 80 on the Billboard Hot 100.

== Track listing ==
7" Single

1. "Paradise" - 3:57
2. "Your Move" - 4:23

12" Single

1. "Paradise" - 5:14
2. "Your Move" - 4:23

== Chart positions ==
Chart (1981)	Peak position
Italy (FIMI)	24
U.S. Billboard Hot 100	80
U.S. Billboard Hot Dance Club Play	1
U.S. Billboard Hot Soul Singles	7
