= You're Too Late =

Single by Fantasy

from the album Fantasy
- B-side: "You're Too Late" (Instrumental version)
- Released: 1980
- Genre: Disco
- Length: 3:41 (7" version); 6:30 (12" version); 6:20 (Album version)
- Label: Pavillion
- Songwriter: Anthony S. Tabbita (Tony Valor)
- Producer: Anthony S. Tabbita (Tony Valor)

"You're Too Late" is a song by Fantasy from their self-titled album and was written and produced by Tony Valor, whose real name is Anthony S. Tabbita.

The song went to number one for one week on the Billboard disco/dance chart in 1981. The single also peaked at #28 on the R&B chart.
