= K's Choice =

Belgian rock band

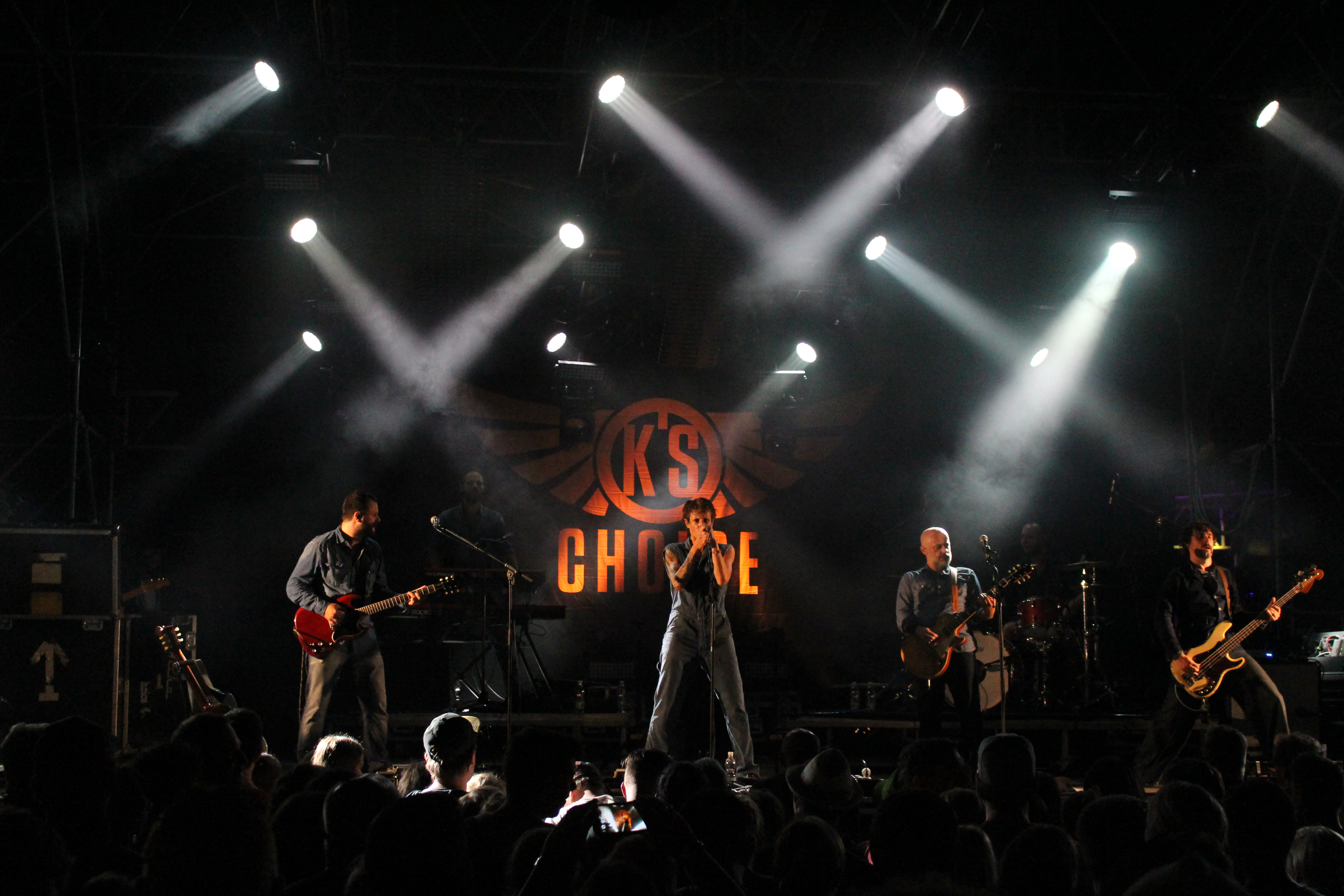
- K's Choice performing in 2016

Background information
- Also known as: The Choice (1994–1995)
- Origin: Antwerp, Belgium
- Genres: Alternative rock, folk rock, post-grunge
- Years active: 1994–2002, 2009–present
- Labels: MPress Records, Wallaby, Double T, 550, Columbia, Epic
- Spinoffs: Woodface
- Spinoff of: The Basement Plugs
- Members: Sam Bettens; Gert Bettens; Bart Van Lierde; Tom Lodewyckx; Reinout Swinnen; Wim Van Der Westen
- Past members: Jan van Sichem Jr. Bart van der Zeeuw; Erik Verheyden; Eric Grossman; Koen Lieckens; Thomas Vanelslander
- Website: www.kschoice.com

K's Choice is a Belgian rock band from Antwerp, formed in 1994. The band's core members are brothers Sam (lead vocals, guitar) and Gert Bettens (guitar, keyboard, vocals). Since 2014, the brothers have been joined by Bart van Lierde (bass), Tom Lodewyckx (lead guitar), Reinout Swinnen (keys) and Wim van der Westen (drums). The band have released seven studio albums to date, several of which have been certified Gold and Platinum by the Belgian Entertainment Association.

In 2025, Chad Childers of Loudwire included the band in his list of "10 '90s Post-Grunge Bands That Should Have Been Bigger".

== Band history ==
In the early 1990s, Sam and Gert Bettens played in a band together called The Basement Plugs. During this time, Sam appeared on several movie soundtracks as a vocalist including "I'm So Lonesome I Could Cry" (originally by Hank Williams) for the movie Vrouwen Willen Trouwen ("Women Want To Marry") and a duet with Frankie Miller, "Why Don't You Try Me", (originally by Ry Cooder) for the movie Ad Fundum. He was offered a recording contract, and formed a new band with Gert in order to fulfil it. The band was originally named The Choice, recording and releasing their debut album The Great Subconscious Club in 1994.

During the initial formation of the band, the Bettens were joined by Jan van Sichem, Jr. (guitar), Bart van der Zeeuw (drums) and Erik Verheyden (bass). This iteration of the band toured Germany and the United States in support of the Indigo Girls. While in the U.S., the band discovered another identically-named act and changed their name to avoid legal problems. They decided upon "K's Choice" by going through the alphabet to see which letter would sound best in front of the word "choice". Since they thought they needed a story behind the new name, they initially claimed that the K referred to Joseph K. from Franz Kafka's novel The Trial, but later the band revealed the arbitrariness of choosing the "K".

=== Paradise in Me and "Not An Addict" ===
In 1995, they released Paradise in Me. "Not an Addict", the first single taken from this album, was successful and brought international fame. For the next year (1996–1997) they toured supporting Alanis Morissette, who heard the band playing on a European festival and handpicked them as her support band.

=== Cocoon Crash, Almost Happy and split ===
In 1998, the band released their third studio album Cocoon Crash. Meanwhile, American Eric Grossman had become the permanent bass player. In 1999, the band appeared on Buffy the Vampire Slayer in the episode "Doppelgängland" performing their song "Virgin State Of Mind". The song appeared on the soundtrack Buffy the Vampire Slayer: The Album. It was at this point that their drummer Bart van der Zeeuw had been replaced by Koen Lieckens. In 2000, their next studio album Almost Happy was finished and released in Europe in September.

In 2001, Live (a 2-CD collection of live recordings) was in stores in Europe while Almost Happy was released in the US with another cover and a second CD of some songs from Live. In 2003, Ten (a collection of ten years of singles and songs that did not appear on their albums, plus the brand new single "Losing You") was released, accompanied by a DVD bearing the same name.

In October 2002, the band decided to go on a sabbatical. Gert and Sam both wanted to try out some solo work. Gert produced an album for a Belgian band, Venus in Flames, and Sam recorded a solo mini-CD Go and appeared on several movie soundtracks with songs of his own ("All of This Past" for Underworld and "Someone to Say Hi To" for Zus and Zo). In addition to four full albums, a live album, and a best-of, they also produced four limited edition and fan club CDs: Extra Cocoon, 2000 Seconds Live, Home and Running Backwards.

=== More solo projects ===
In 2005, Sam released his solo album Scream in both Europe and the U.S., accompanied by a tour. Gert, having flirted for a while with the band name Moon Brigade, announced his new band is called Woodface (which is also the name of one of his favorite albums from Crowded House). Woodface released its first album Good Morning Hope on 19 September 2005. Sam released another solo album called Shine and Gert another Woodface Album Comet in 2007. In 2008, Sam released another album, Never Say Goodbye. Gert and his band Woodface opened at several of Sam's shows in 2007 and 2008.

In an 7 October 2008, interview with Austin Sound Check, Sam confirmed plans for a new album in 2009. On 8 June 2009, six years after K's Choice announced their indefinite hiatus, the band's official website announced they will perform at the 35th edition of Folk Dranouter on 7 August 2009. In 2009, to celebrate the return of K's Choice on the international level, Sony Music released the compilation album The Essential K's Choice.

=== Return and Echo Mountain ===
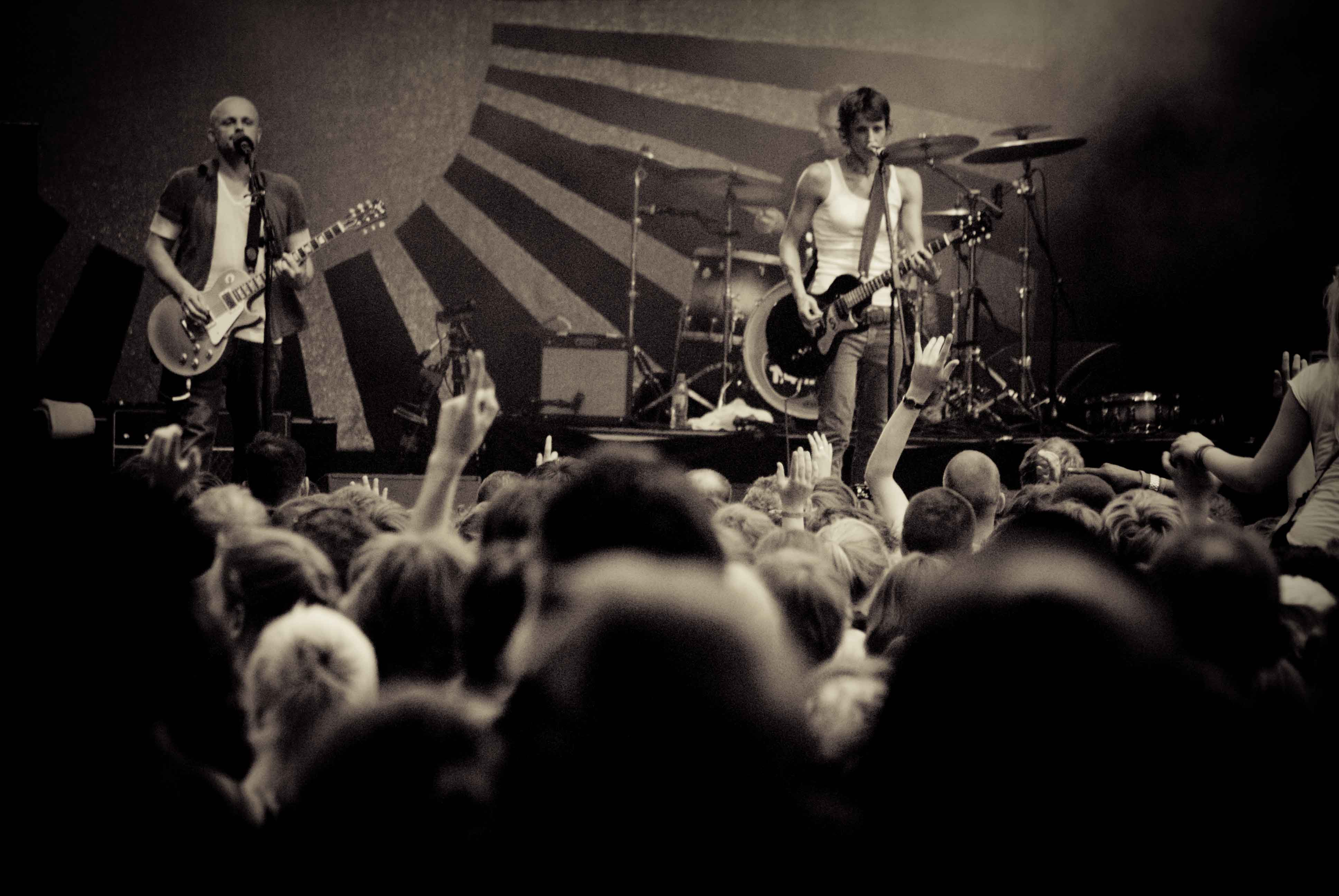
K's Choice during a 2010 concert

K's Choice recorded their fifth studio album Echo Mountain in the Echo Mountain Studios in Asheville, North Carolina. On 22 February 2010, they confirmed on their website that the new album would be released on 26 March 2010. "When I Lay Beside You" and "Come Live The Life" were released as singles. In 2011, Sam and Gert recorded a follow-up to Echo Mountain in the form of an acoustic CD called Little Echoes. For this album and the following tour, the both of them were only joined by pianist Reinout Swinnen.

In 2013, Sam and Gert returned to Echo Mountain Studios to record an album as a side project under the name "Bettens" for a 3D documentary about an expedition to Antarctica, Beyond the Challenge. The album titled, Waving at the Sun was eventually released under the K's Choice name in the U.S. and other countries in 2014.

=== Private Revolution ===
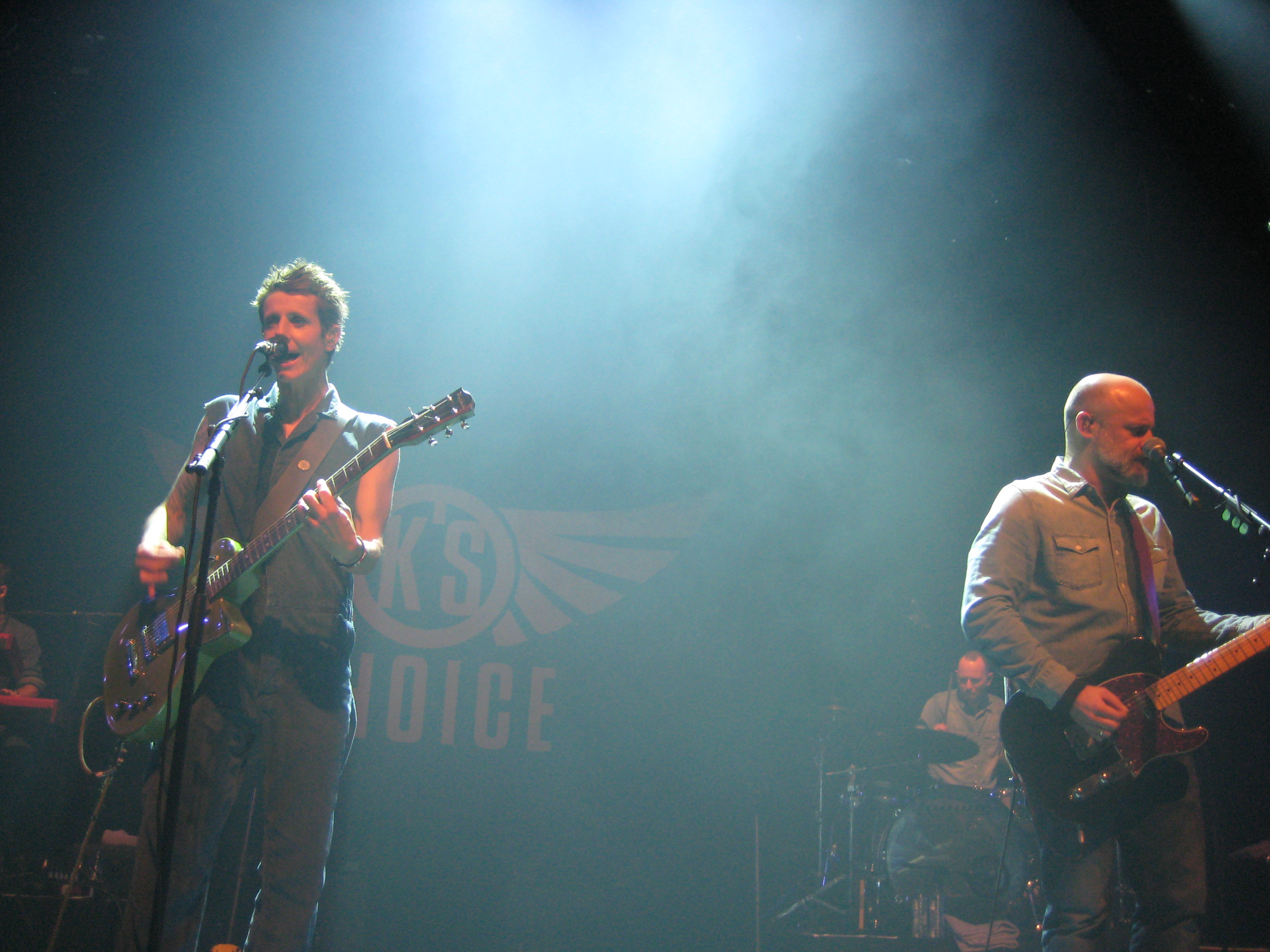
K's Choice in 2015

On 6 February 2015, K's Choice released the first single "Private Revolution" of their latest studio album The Phantom Cowboy. A teaser video for "Private Revolution" was released to YouTube on 5 February 2015. The video features concert and prior video footage of Sam and Gert. A video for the track "Bag of Concrete" was released on 12 June 2015. The album was released on 5 February 2015 in much of Europe by Wallaby Records, LLC and distributed by Sony, and on 18 September 2015 in the US, UK, Canada, and Ireland by MPress Records. In September 2015 the band released "Perfect Scar" as a single and video. The album was a Top 3 hit in Belgium.

In March 2016, K's Choice embarked on their first US tour in a decade in support of The Phantom Cowboy with longtime friends and, more recently, labelmates A Fragile Tomorrow.

=== The Backpack Sessions, Liefde Voor Muziek and 30th anniversary ===
In late 2016 the band released The Backpack Sessions, as a companion album to the tour of the same name. It featured acoustic re-workings of songs from albums like The Great Subconscious Club, Cocoon Crash and The Phantom Cowboy. The album also featured cover versions of Aretha Franklin's "(You Make Me Feel Like A) Natural Woman" and Justin Bieber's "Love Yourself".

In January 2017, the band released a stripped-back re-recording of "Not an Addict." It featured Skin of Skunk Anansie as a guest vocalist, who had previously performed the song live with the group on several occasions.

On 24 March 2017, the band released an album entitled 25 as a retrospective of their 25 years as a group. The album included new song "Resonate" and the new version of "Not an Addict". The album went to #4 on The Belgian album charts.

On 16 March 2018, the band released a concert album entitled Live at the Ancienne Belgique, a double live album recorded in Brussels on 13 December 2017 during the 25th Anniversary tour.

In 2018 Sam and Gert participated in the popular Belgian TV show Liefde Voor Muziek, in which they performed songs by Jasper Steverlinck, Within Temptation and Helmut Lotti a.o. Belgian singer Niels Destadsbader sang K's Choice's "Believe" on the show, re-worked to "Verover Mij", which became a top-five single nationally. At the same time the album Love = Music was released, featuring all Liefde Voor Muziek covers, which reached the top 10 on Belgium's album charts.

In December 2022 the band announced a 30th anniversary tour, a vinyl box-set and a brand new single Time Is A Parasite, which was pronounced Catch Of The Day on Studio Brussel on the day of release.

After a series of sold-out birthday concerts in 2023, K's Choice are returning to an acoustic setting in theatres in 2024.

== Members ==
Current members

- Sam Bettens – lead vocals, guitar (1994–2002, 2009–present)
- Gert Bettens – guitar, keyboards, backing vocals (1994–2002, 2009–present)
- Reinout Swinnen – keyboards (2009–present)
- Bart Van Lierde – bass (2014–present)
- Tom Lodewyckx – guitar (2014–present)
- Wim Van Der Westen – drums (2014–present)

Former members

- Erik Verheyden – bass (1994–1997)
- Bart Van Der Zeeuw – drums, backing vocals (1994–1999)
- Jan van Sichem, Jr. – guitar (1994–1997, 1999–2002)
- Eric Grossman – bass (1997–2002, 2009–2014)
- Koen Lieckens – drums (1999–2002, 2009–2014)
- Thomas Vanelslander – guitar (2009–2014)

Timeline

== Discography ==
=== Studio albums ===
- The Great Subconscious Club (1994)
- Paradise in Me (1995)
- Cocoon Crash (1998)
- Almost Happy (2000)
- Echo Mountain (2010)
- The Phantom Cowboy (2015)
- Love = Music (2018)

=== Compilation and concert albums and fan club-only CDs ===
- Extra Cocoon (1998)
- 2000 Seconds Live (1998) (fanclub only)
- Live (2001)
- Home (2001) (fanclub only)
- Running Backwards (2003) (fanclub only)
- 10: 1993-2003 - Ten Years Of (2003)
- The Essential K's Choice (2009)
- Little Echoes (2011) (acoustic album)
- Waving at the Sun (2013) (under the name "Bettens")
- The Backpack Sessions (2016) (acoustic album)
- 25 (2017)
- Live at the Ancienne Belgique (2018)

=== Singles ===
List of singles, with selected chart positions
Title	Year	Peak chart positions	
Title	Year	AUS	US Mod. Rock
"Not an Addict"	1997	22	5
"Everything for Free"	1998	—	28
