= The Quick (British band) =

British dance-pop duo

- Also known as: Giant Steps
- Origin: England
- Genres: New wave
- Years active: 1978–1987
- Labels: Epic, A&M
- Past members: Colin Campsie; George McFarlane

The Quick were an English new wave pop duo that consisted of vocalist Colin "Col" Campsie and bassist/keyboardist George McFarlane. Their greatest success in the US came in 1981 when their song "Zulu" spent two weeks at No. 1 on the US Hot Dance Music/Club Play chart.

== Career ==
McFarlane and Campsie originally met in California in 1978 and began working together when they returned to England, teaming up with guitarist/keyboardist Ivan Penfold and drummer Graham Broad. Augmented by guitarists Rob Greene and Danny McIntosh Jr., the band initially christened themselves Grand Hotel and in early 1979 released one album for CBS UK under the title Do Not Disturb. Later that year, Campsie and McFarlane resurfaced as The Quick. Their debut single, "Sharks Are Cool, Jets Are Hot" was released on CBS affiliate Epic Records in 1979. In 1981, the duo's single "Hip Shake Jerk" became a hit in Australia, reaching No. 12, and their first album On the Uptake was quickly released there. Remixed and repackaged as One Light in a Blackout (in Canada) and Fascinating Rhythm (in Europe), the album was released to the rest of the world in 1982, scoring a U.S. dance hit with "Zulu". The single "Rhythm of the Jungle" was another top 20 success in Australia, reaching No. 13, and also became a hit in Europe. Stylistically, this inaugural period for the band was characterized by a hybrid of popular funk, dance, and new wave influences with an emphasis on bass and keyboards.

By the early 1980s, McFarlane and Campsie had also started doing studio work for other musicians, producing an album for Endgames among others. The Quick's second album, International Thing, released by Epic in 1984, showed the band moving away from their earlier dance-friendly roots, and adopting a more mainstream AOR approach, and incorporating a variety of styles that expanded their previous boundaries, to include a harder-edged rock sound. During this period, Campsie and McFarlane maintained a close friendship and professional alliance with British duo Go West. The Quick's final album, Wah Wah, released in 1986 on A&M Records, was produced by the Cure bassist Phil Thornalley and saw the band moving sonically in an even heavier rock direction while still maintaining melodic pop sensibilities. Under Thornalley's direction, Wah Wah features dense 'wall of sound' production and heavy processing of instrumentation akin to that heard on the Trevor Horn-produced 90125 album by Yes (1984).

McFarlane and Campsie returned to Los Angeles for their next project, teaming up with producer Gardner Cole, resurfacing as Giant Steps in 1988 and releasing their sole album The Book of Pride through A&M. Book of Pride found Campsie and McFarlane returning to their dance/funk roots, but with an updated rhythmic sense and keyboard-dominated sound displaying the influences of artists such as Prince, Morris Day & the Time, and Ready for the World. Working with R&B producer Preston Glass, Campsie and McFarlane recorded three new Giant Steps songs in 1989; the ballad "Lonely 4 U", "Paint the Town Blue", and the uptempo "What We're Made Of" (featuring Larry Graham guesting on bass and vocals). A second Giant Steps album never materialized.

From 1990 to 2010, Campsie was married to British vocalist Beverley Craven. Through his London-based company Song-Creator, McFarlane continues to be active as a songwriter, music producer, programmer, arranger and songwriting consultant, and has written music for television shows including CSI NY, The Late Show with David Letterman, Two and a Half Men, Sex and the City, American Idol, Good Morning America, and The Oprah Winfrey Show, among others.

== Girls Can't Help It ==
In the early 1980s, Campsie and McFarlane put together a pop act, made up of Belinda “Billie” Adams, Katy Lynne and Peggy Sue Fender, and called them Girls Can't Help It. After their debut single "Baby Doll" was a top ten hit on Billboard's Disco/Dance chart, they signed to Sire Records and released a version of "Rhythm of the Jungle".

== Discography ==
=== Albums ===
- 1981: On the Uptake
- 1982: Fascinating Rhythm
- 1984: International Thing
- 1986: Wah Wah

=== Singles ===
- 1979: "Sharks Are Cool, Jets Are Hot"
- 1980: "Hip Shake Jerk" - AUS No. 12, NZ No. 32
- 1980: "Young Men Drive Fast"
- 1980: "Ship to Shore"
- 1981: "Zulu" - US Dance No. 1
- 1982: "Rhythm of the Jungle" - AUS No. 13, NL No. 9, UK No. 41, US Dance No. 14
- 1982: "Touch"
- 1984: "International Thing"
- 1984: "Missing You Now"
- 1985: "Down the Wire" - UK No. 88
- 1986: "Bed of Nails"
- 1986: "We Can Learn from This"
- 1987: "I Needed You, You Needed Me"

== BBC session ==
The Quick recorded one radio session for the BBC, circa 1984. Four tracks from this session surfaced on their 1986 album Wah Wah:

1. "The Big Decision"
2. "Sharon"
3. "Down the Wire"
4. "We Can Learn from This"
5. "Heaven and Earth"

== See also ==
- Giant Steps (band)
- List of number-one dance hits (United States)
- List of artists who reached number one on the US Dance chart
