= Heaven of My Life =

Promotional single by Change

from the album Miracles
- B-side: "Miracles"
- Released: 1981
- Recorded: Recorded at Fonoprint Studios, Bologna, Italy. All vocals recorded and mixed at Mediasound, New York City. Mastered at Sterling Sound Inc., New York City
- Length: 5:34
- Label: Atlantic
- Songwriters: Paolo Gianolio, David Romani, Mauro Malavasi, Tanyayette Willoughby
- Producers: Jacques Fred Petrus, Mauro Malavasi

"Heaven of My Life" is a 1981 album cut by Change from the LP Miracles, which featured vocals by Diva Gray, Jocelyn Shaw, Tanyayette Willoughby and James Robinson on leads, and Luther Vandross, Crystal Davis, Ullanda McCullough, Benny Diggs, Dennis Collins and Fonzi Thornton providing the backups. The song also featured a unique guitar breakdown performed by Doc Powell. Along with "Paradise" and "Hold Tight", it became a number one single on the US dance chart for five weeks. It was released as a promotional single in October 1981.

== Chart positions ==
Chart (1981)	Peak position
US Billboard Hot Dance Club Play	1
