= Zulu (song) =

Single by The Quick
- Released: 1981
- Genre: New wave
- Length: 7:44
- Label: Epic, Pavillion
- Songwriter(s): Colin Campsie, George McFarlane
- Producer(s): The Quick

The Quick singles chronology
| "Ship to Shore" (1980) | "Zulu" (1981) | "Rhythm of the Jungle" (1982) |

"Zulu" is a 1981 song by British duo the Quick. The song was their most successful of three singles the group placed on the dance chart. The single went to number one for two weeks in October 1981. "Zulu" also peaked at number sixty on the R&B singles chart.

== See also ==
- List of number-one dance singles of 1981 (U.S.)
