= Dancin' the Night Away =

Single by Voggue

from the album Voggue
- B-side: "Givin' It Up"
- Released: 1981
- Genre: Disco
- Length: 3:40 (7" version); 7:24 (Album version)
- Label: Red Rock/Atlantic
- Songwriter(s): Denis Lepage, Denyse Lepage
- Producer(s): Trans-Canada Disques

"Dancin' the Night Away" is a 1981 song by the disco dance duo Voggue from their self-titled album. The song was written by Denis Lepage and Denyse Lepage and produced by Trans-Canada Disques.

== Chart performance ==
"Dancin' the Night Away" went to number one for three weeks on the Billboard disco/dance chart. The single failed to chart on either the Billboard Hot 100 or the R&B chart (although the single did "Bubble Under" at No. 109 for one week). In the UK, the single peaked at No. 39 in August 1981. In the Netherlands, it reached number 22.
