= Not an Addict =

1996 single by K's Choice

Single by K's Choice

from the album Paradise in Me
- B-side: "Dad"; "Something's Wrong" (live)
- Released: July 1995
- Studio: Jet (Brussels, Belgium)
- Genre: Grunge
- Length: 4:50
- Label: Double T Music
- Songwriters: Gert Bettens; Sarah Bettens
- Producer: Jean Blaute

Music video
- "Not an Addict" on YouTube

"Not an Addict" is a song by Belgian rock band K's Choice from their second studio album, Paradise in Me (1996). It was written by the band's core members—siblings Gert and Sam (then known as Sarah) Bettens—produced by Jean Blaute, and recorded at Jet Studios in Brussels, Belgium.

Double T Music released "Not an Addict" as a single in Belgium in July 1995, and it was issued in other territories between late 1995 and mid-1997. It became the band's most successful hit, reaching the top 40 in several countries, peaking at number eight in the Flanders region of Belgium, and climbing to number five on the US Billboard Modern Rock Tracks chart. The song won a ZAMU Award for Best Single in 1995.

== Background and meaning ==
The song's content originates from Sam Bettens' previous experiences with drugs and his views on substance dependence. He explained in an interview that he was addicted to cigarettes and experimented with acid and mushrooms but never tried any hard drugs, fearing that it would make him lose touch with his self-control. Bettens went on to explain that the song is not pro-drug and expressed his worry about fans of the song trying drugs because of the subject matter. However, he also revealed that the track is not anti-drug, saying, "At home, there's a lot of debate about legalizing soft drugs, like pot, to separate them from the criminality that sometimes surrounds hard drugs. The issue isn't black and white, and neither is the song".

== Composition ==
"Not an Addict" is written in the key of E major and has a tempo of 169 beats per minute. It has a length of four minutes and fifty seconds.

== Critical reception ==
Upon the 1995 release, Music & Media described the song as "a somehow more disciplined version of the Breeders." On the 23 December 1996 issue of the magazine, it was proclaimed the "single of the week". According to the entry: "Among all that talent pouring out of Belgium—dEUS, Moondog Jr., The Sands—it is possible to overlook the latest gem out of this small country. To pass up on K-Choice would be a major mistake. K-Choice's singer/co-writer Sarah Bettens is obviously inspired by US alternative rock queens such as the Deal sisters, Heather Nova and Johnette Napolitano. A little bit of Bangles pops up at the end, but the guitars remain loud and clear." Music Week rated it three out of five, describing it as "a brooding, bass-heavy torch song overlaid by breezy atmospheric vocals from the Belgian four-piece". In 1995, the song earned a ZAMU Award for Best Single.

== Track listings ==
- Benelux CD single (1995)
1. "Not an Addict" – 4:48
- Benelux CD single (1996)
1. "Not an Addict" – 4:48
2. "Dad" (recorded 4 December 1995 for "2 Meter Sessies") – 3:19
3. "Not an Addict" (recorded 4 December 1995 for "2 Meter Sessies") – 4:36
4. "Something's Wrong" (live version) – 3:49
- European CD single
1. "Not an Addict" – 4:48
2. "Something's Wrong" – 3:49
- European maxi-CD and Australian CD single
1. "Not an Addict" – 4:48
2. "Something's Wrong" – 3:49
3. "Little Man" – 3:54
4. "Basically the Same" – 3:30
- German maxi-CD single
1. "Not an Addict" – 4:48
2. "Concert Intro + To This Day" (live at Pinkpop '96) – 5:13
3. "My Record Company" (live at Pinkpop '96) – 3:54
4. "My Heart" (live at Pinkpop '96) – 3:32
5. "Walk Away" (live at Pinkpop '96) – 3:13

== Credits and personnel ==
Credits are taken from the 1995 Benelux CD single liner notes.

Studio

- Recorded at Jet Studios (Brussels, Belgium).

Personnel

- K's Choice – performance
  - Gert Bettens – writing, artwork illustration
  - Sam Bettens (as Sarah Bettens) – writing
- Jean Blaute – production, mixing
- Werner Pensaert – mixing
- Jurgen Rogiers – photography
- King & Kong – artwork design

== Charts ==
=== Weekly charts ===
Chart (1995–1997)	Peak position
Australia (ARIA)	22
Belgium (Ultratop 50 Flanders)	8
Belgium (Ultratop 50 Wallonia)	25
Canada Rock/Alternative (RPM)	6
Europe (Eurochart Hot 100)	80
France (SNEP)	21
Netherlands (Dutch Top 40)	19
Netherlands (Single Top 100)	15
US Hot 100 Airplay (Billboard)	56
US Modern Rock Tracks (Billboard)	5

=== Year-end charts ===
Chart (1995)	Position
Belgium (Ultratop 50 Flanders)	29

Chart (1996)	Position
Australia (ARIA)	88
Belgium (Ultratop 50 Wallonia)	92
France (SNEP)	87

Chart (1997)	Position
US Modern Rock Tracks (Billboard)	12

== Release history ==
Region	Date	Format(s)	Label(s)	Ref.
Benelux	July 1995	CD	Double T Music	
United States	3 June 1997	Contemporary hit radio	550 Music	
