= Hepburn (band) =

British pop rock band

- Origin: United Kingdom
- Genres: Pop rock, pop punk
- Years active: 1997–2000
- Label: Columbia
- Past members: Jamie Benson; Lisa Lister; Sarah Davies; Beverley Fullen; Lisa Gordon; Tasha Baylis

Hepburn were a four-piece British all-female pop rock band. The band released an album and three singles between 1999 and 2000, but were best known for their first single "I Quit", which reached number 8 on the UK charts. Hepburn was best known to American audiences when they appeared on the soundtrack to the TV series Buffy the Vampire Slayer. The band was made up of Jamie Benson (vocals), Lisa Lister (guitar), Sarah Davies (bass), Beverley Fullen (drums), Lisa Gordon (drums, replacement for Fullen), and Tasha Baylis (drums, replacement for Gordon).

== Background ==
The band began in 1997 when singer Jamie Benson met Lisa Lister at a party. Drummer Fullen knew Jamie from music school, and Davies was added to complete the lineup. Their name was inspired by the actress Audrey Hepburn.

The cover art for 'I Quit', the band's best-known single.

Their first single, "I Quit", was a song co-written by Phil Thornalley. Thornalley had recently had major chart success with "Torn", which made Natalie Imbruglia a huge success, and Imbruglia reportedly had declined to record "I Quit." "I Quit" was released by Hepburn in May 1999 and peaked at number 8 on the UK Singles Chart.

Though a music video accompanied the release of the single, later in the year, a new video for "I Quit" shot using scenes from Buffy the Vampire Slayer, including scenes of the band on the sets of the show, and also with the band acting like vampires at The Bronze. The track appeared on the official Buffy soundtrack and was pushed to radio as a key track with the CD release, despite the fact that the song never appeared on the show (reportedly it was supposed to appear on the show with the band playing the background scenes, some of which appear in the video, but never did). The music video also appears on the Region 2 and 4 DVD release of the first season of Buffy the Vampire Slayer.

In September 1999, drummer Beverly Fullen left and was replaced by Lisa Gordon, and then Tasha Baylis. According to bassist Davies, Fullen left when her boyfriend, band co-manager Ashen Datchler, resigned. Datchler is brother of former Johnny Hates Jazz singer Clark Datchler, and friends with Thornalley, who was also a member of Johnny Hates Jazz in its later years.

Hepburn disbanded in the summer of 2000 after being dropped by Columbia Records, having released a total of three singles, all of which went top 20 in the UK, and one album. The album reached the UK Top 30 Albums despite receiving a scathing review from NME.

== Afterwards ==
After the breakup, Jamie Benson released a solo album in 2002 called Jamie Benson - My Confession. The album had four singles recorded for it, but only one was released commercially: "Invincible,” which was released in mid-2001, but only charted in the top 100. Benson since went on to become a music teacher at Laine Theatre Arts. Davies herself, after a long time away from the public eye, appeared as a guest on the identity parade segment of Never Mind the Buzzcocks on 10 January 2008. Phill Jupitus' team failed to correctly identify Davies, while Lauren Laverne (the guest team member), totally ruled out Davies as a possible correct answer from the beginning. Davies is now a detective constable with Nottinghamshire Police.

== Members ==
- Jamie Benson - vocals
- Lisa Lister - guitars
- Sarah Davies - bass
- Beverley Fullen - drums
- Lisa Gordon - drums
- Tasha Baylis - drums

== Discography ==
=== Albums ===
Title	Details
Hepburn	Released: 30 August 1999; Charts: #28 (UK); Label: Columbia

=== Singles ===
Title	Details
"I Quit"	Released: 17 May 1999; Charts: #8 (UK); B-Sides: "Sleeping Beauty"; "Butterfly"; "Cold World"; "I Quit (Dave Sears 'On Time Mix')"
"Bugs"	Released: 16 August 1999; Charts: #14 (UK); B-Sides: "Bugs (The Wiseguys Remix)"; "Alibi for Life"; "Bugs (Dave Sears' Reaching Out Vocal)"; "In Case You Forget"
Deep Deep Down	Released: 7 February 2000; Charts: #16 (UK); B-Sides: "I Quit (Acoustic Version)"; "Deep Deep Down (Ray Roc's Soul Latin Club Mix)"; "Deep Deep Down (Dave's Way Down Mix)"; "Deep Deep Down (Attica Blues Remix)" [MC only]

=== Compilations ===
- Hepburn (Columbia, 1999) - five-track sampler

=== Video compilation appearances ===
- 124606 8" Lasersdisk (Diamond Time Ltd) - "Deep Deep Down"
