= Scream (Sam Bettens album) =

Studio album by Sarah Bettens
- Released: 2005
- Genre: Pop, rock

Sarah Bettens chronology
Go (2004)	Scream (2005)	Shine (2007)

Scream is the first full-length solo album from Belgian rock musician Sarah Bettens. In 2004, Bettens released a five-track EP called Go. Four of the songs from Go were included on Scream; only "Grey" did not make the cut.

Scream was released in Europe on March 14, 2005, and in the United States on August 23, 2005.

It was rated three out of five stars by AllMusic.

== Track listing ==
1. "Scream" (Emerson Swinford; Guy Erez; Matthew Gerrard; Sarah Bettens)
2. "Stay" (Bettens; Steve Booker)
3. "Come over Here" (Jimmy Harry; Bettens)
4. "Not Insane" (Bettens)
5. "Turn Around" (Bettens)
6. "Go" (Bettens)
7. "Don't Stop" (John O'Brien; Bettens)
8. "Fine" (Greg Wells; Bettens)
9. "One Second" (Bettens)
10. "Sister" (Bettens)
11. "She Says" (Wells; Kara DioGuardi; Bettens)
12. "Follow Me" (Bettens)
13. "Don't Let Me Drag You Down" (Bettens)
14. "I'm Okay" (Bettens)
