= Sam Bettens =

Belgian musician

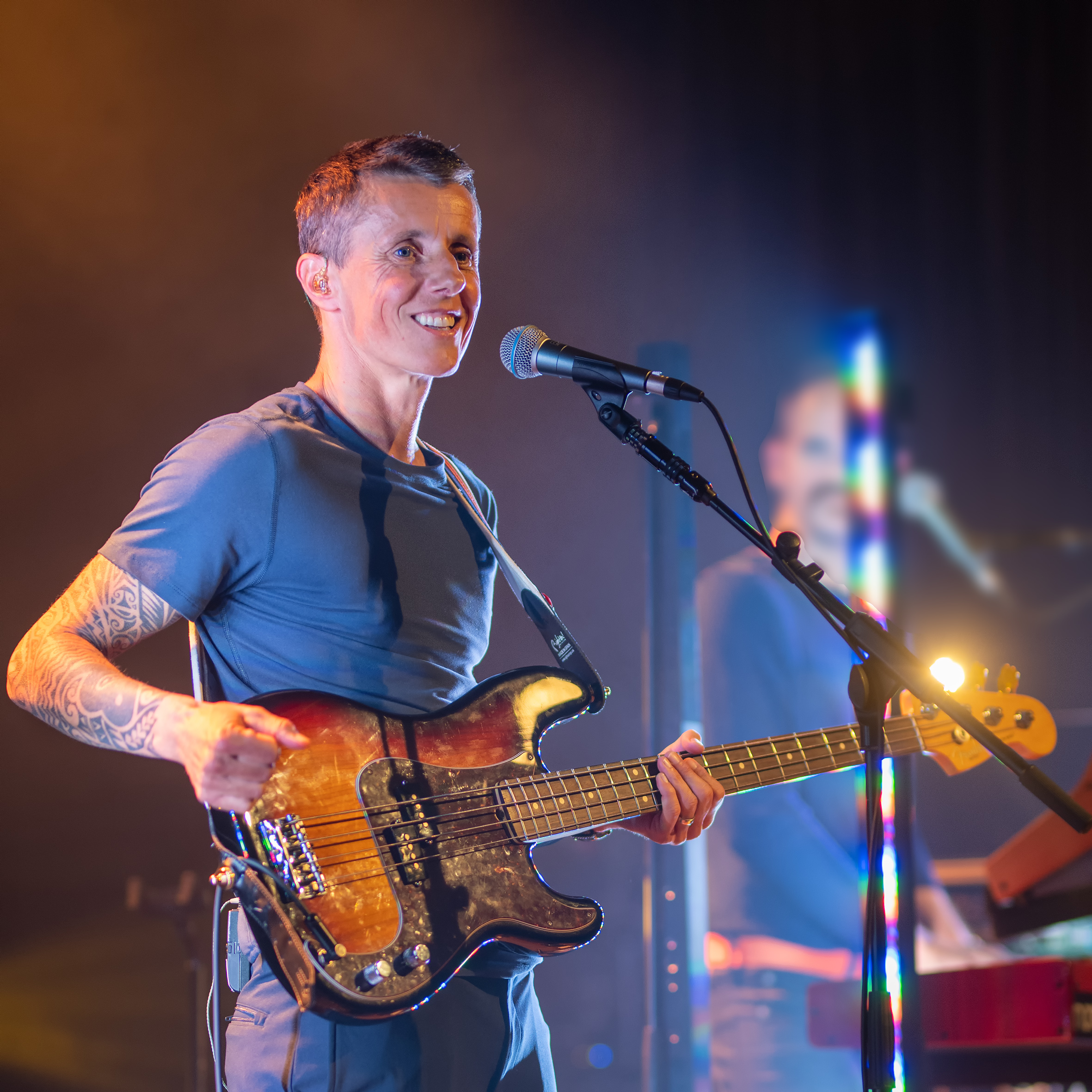
- Bettens in 2022

Background information
- Born: Sarah Bettens; September 23, 1972 (age 53); Kapellen, Belgium
- Occupation: Singer
- Instruments: Vocals, guitar, bass, piano
- Years active: 1993–present
- Member of: K's Choice

Sam Bettens (formerly Sarah Bettens, born September 23, 1972) is a Belgian singer and musician, best known as the lead singer of the Belgian band, K's Choice.

In May 2019, he came out as a transgender man.

== Career ==
=== K's Choice ===
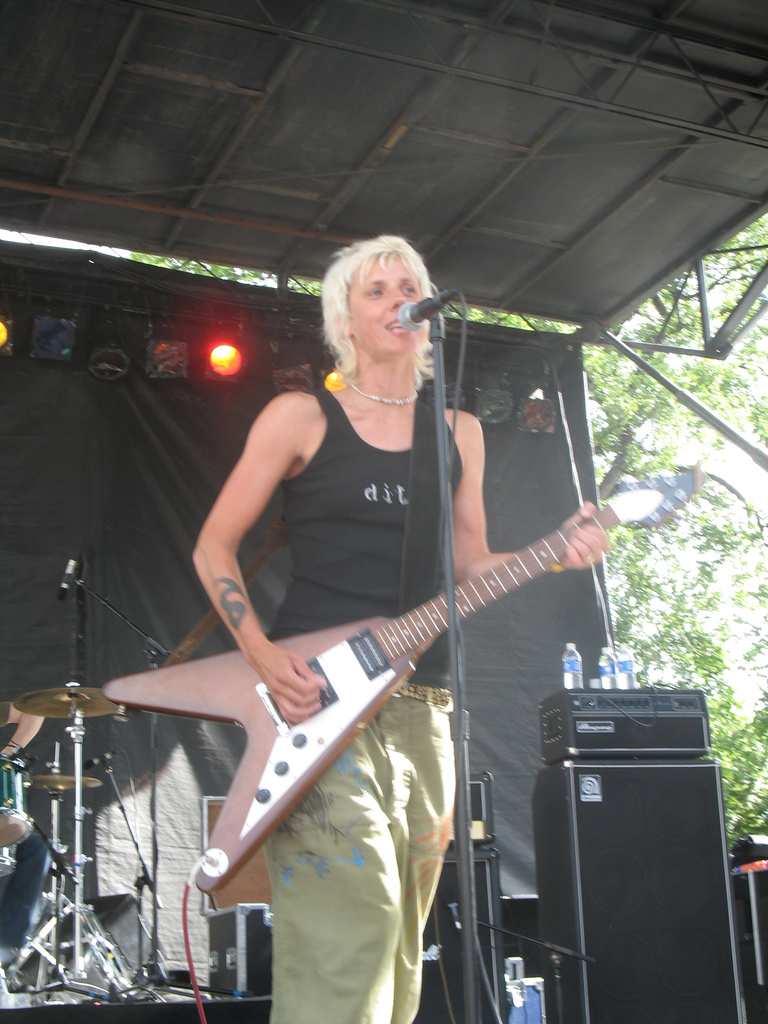
Bettens in 2006

In the mid-1990s, Bettens formed the band K's Choice with his brother Gert. They are the two best-known faces of the band. The band is popular in Belgium, the Netherlands, and France, and has toured in the U.S. with The Verve Pipe, Tonic, Alanis Morissette and the Indigo Girls, as well as on its own.

=== Solo ===
Bettens' first solo effort was the five-track EP, Go, released 31 May 2004. Four of the five songs from Go were included on his first full-length solo album, Scream, released in Europe on 14 March 2005, and in the USA on 23 August 2005.

In March 2007, Bettens released a three-track digital-only EP exclusively through online music label Fuzz (music company). His second full-length album, Shine, including new mixes of the tracks from the Fuzz EP, was released in 2007. It was produced by Brad Wood. The full CD was distributed for free with the 13 October edition of the Flemish newspaper De Morgen in Belgium, which sold 180,000 copies. (Normally the paper sells 95,000 copies.)

In 2007, Bettens won an EBBA Award, awarded annually to ten emerging artists or groups who reached audiences outside their own countries with their first internationally released album in the past year.

In late 2008, Bettens released the album Never Say Goodbye, consisting of recordings of live performances of K's Choice and solo songs, covers, and new songs which had been played during previous tours. The album was only available at concerts and from his online shop.

Also in 2008, Sam was honored with a star on Nirvana Studios - Wall of Fame.

There were plans to license the single "Come Over Here" from his LP Scream for episode 409 of the American series The L Word. However, the plans fell through due to problems involving the song's co-writer and record label. The song also appears on the premier Music With a Twist compilation (Sony).

After having played Michigan Womyn's Music Festival in 2006 solo, Bettens organized a band which, at the time, was identified as all-female, for a performance there in 2007.

In June 2012, he worked as a firefighter for a year in the Johnson City Fire Department.

Bettens has provided vocals for movie soundtracks, including Underworld, Wild Things, Zus and Zo, and Leef!.

=== Rex Rebel ===
In 2018, Sam formed the electronic music group Rex Rebel with fellow musicians Reinout Swinnen (K's Choice's keyboardist) and Wim Van der Westenthe (K's Choice's drummer). The band released its debut single, "Big Shot", on 21 October 2019, and full-length debut album, Run, on 28 February 2020.

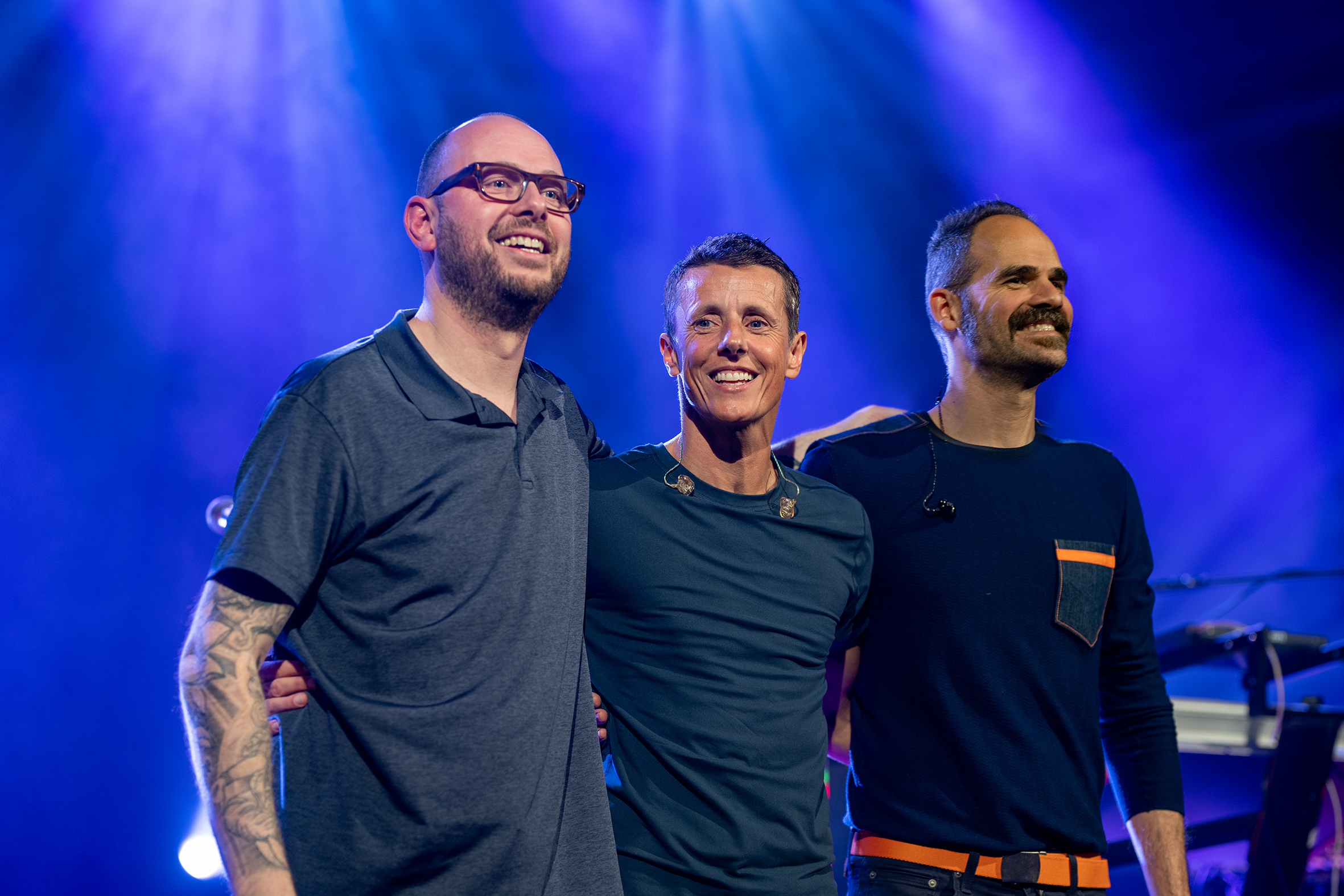
Rex Rebel

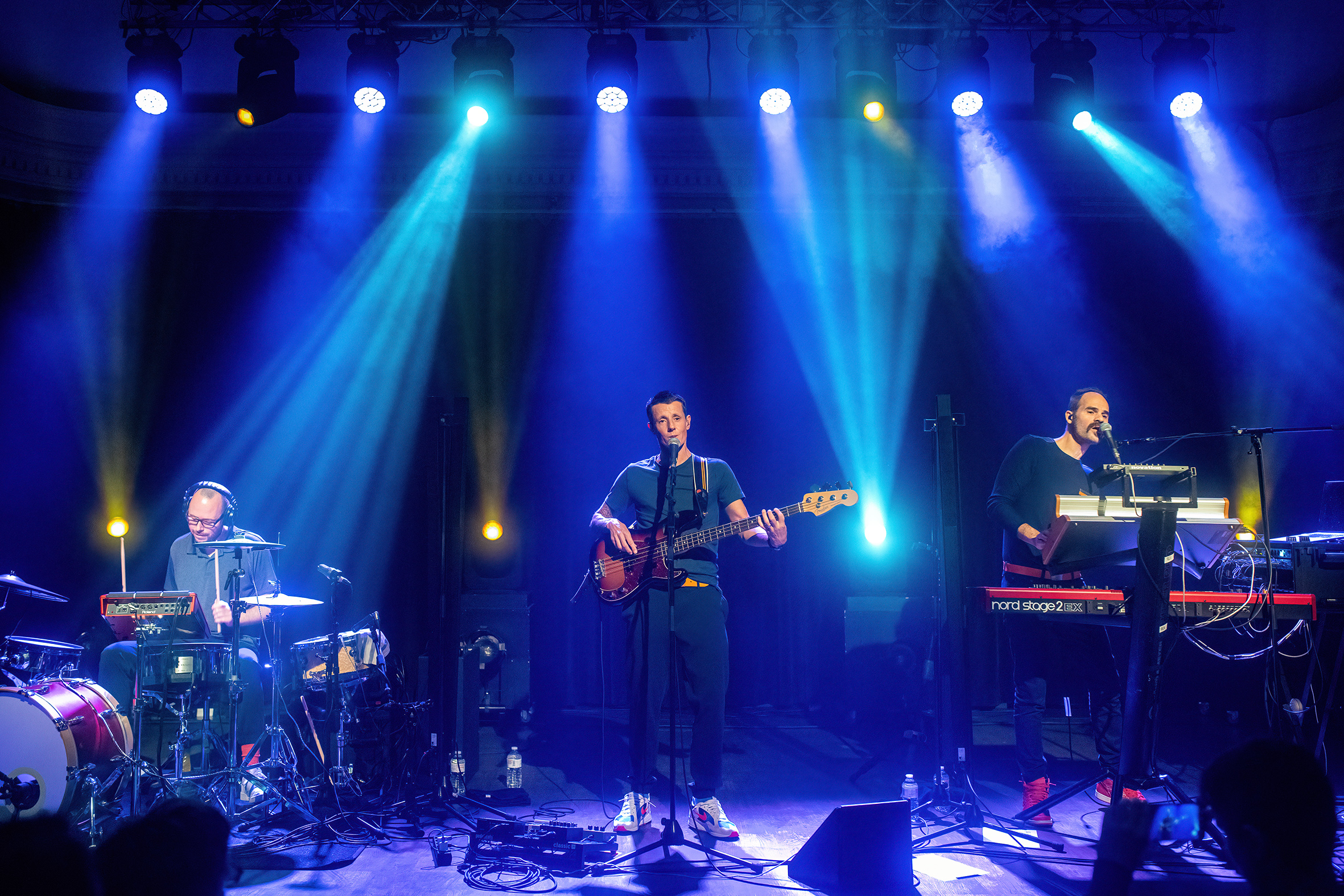
Rex Rebel on stage

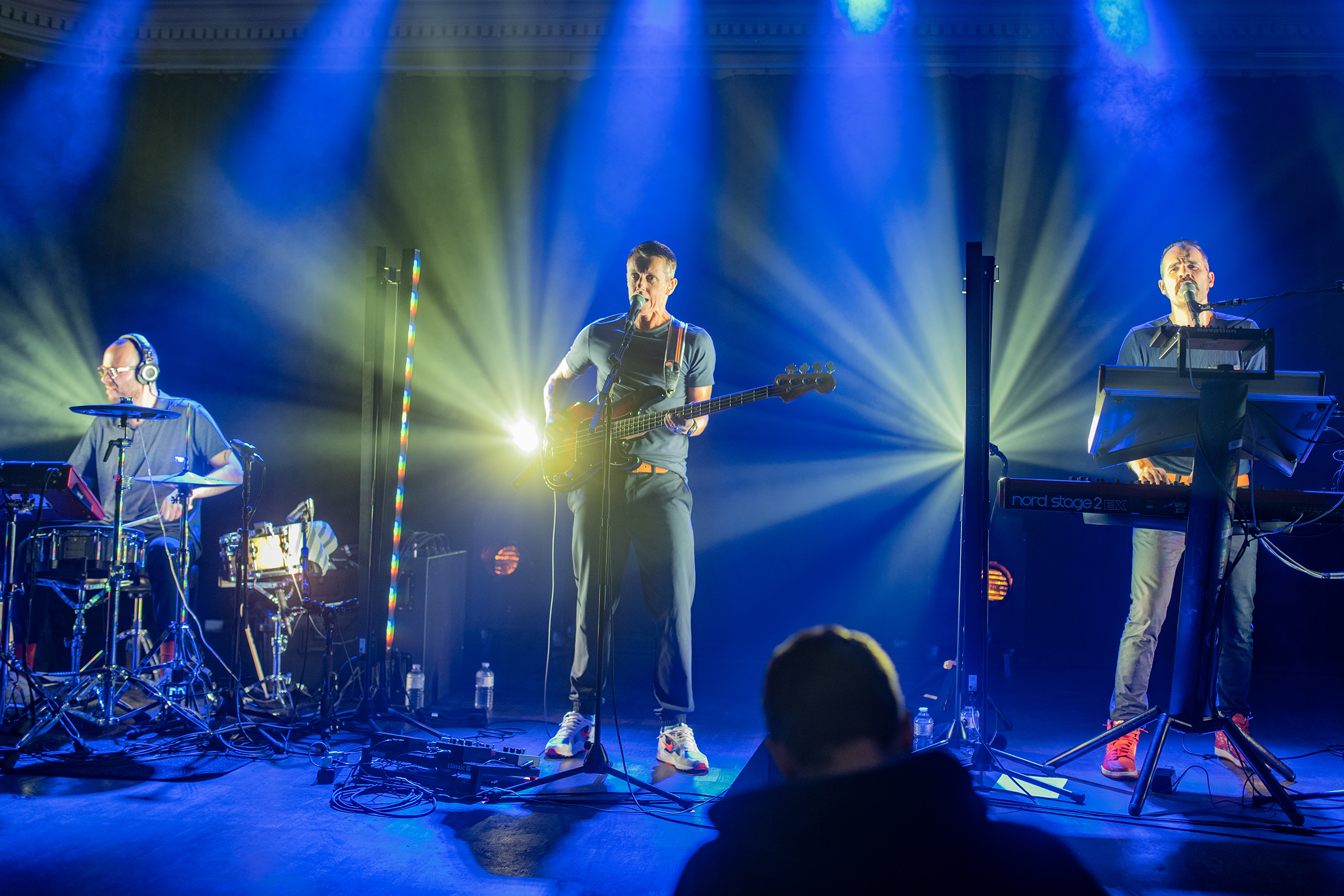
Rex Rebel on stage

== Personal life ==
On 17 May 2019 Bettens came out to the public as a transgender man and had his name changed from Sarah to Sam. Sam started transitioning in 2019. In a YouTube video, Bettens said, "being transgender is not a choice. I always have been, I just didn't know it until now." He said he is taking hormone replacement therapy and noted that this would affect his voice and singing, and that he was working with a voice coach. Before coming out as trans, there was a period where he publicly identified as a lesbian (starting in May 2002), and he has had a large lesbian fanbase since the beginning of his career with K's Choice in the 90s.

Sam Bettens was born in Kapellen, Belgium. He currently lives in Palm Desert, California, having moved there from Johnson City, Tennessee in 2017, with his partner, two step-children, and two adopted children.

== Discography ==
=== Albums ===
- 2004 Go (EP)
- 2005 Scream
- 2007 Fuzz Exclusive EP (EP) – digital-only
- 2007 Shine
- 2008 Never Say Goodbye
- 2025 Coming home

=== Singles ===
- 2002 "Someone to Say Hi To"
- 2002 "You Always Know Your Home"
- 2004 "Fine"
- 2005 "Not Insane"
- 2005 "Stay"
- 2005 "Leef"
- 2006 "Come Over Here"
- 2006 "I Need a Woman"
- 2007 "Daddy's Gun"
- 2007 "I Can't Get Out"

=== Duets ===
- 1993 "Why Don't You Try Me" (with Frankie Miller)
- 1996 "Not an Addict" (with Skunk Anansie)
- 2000 "I Alone" (with Anouk)
- 2016 "All I Want" (with Niels Geusebroek)
- 2017 "Mob Wife" (with a balladeer)
- 2020 "Hat in Hand" (with a balladeer)

=== With Rex Rebel ===
==== Albums ====
- 2020 Run
- 2021 Live at the AB

==== Singles ====
- 2020 "Freedom"

== Video ==
- Backstage video of Bettens
- "I Can't Get Out"
- "It's Alright"
- "Put It Out for Good"
- Bettens live at l'Elysée Montmartre, Paris - part 1
- Bettens live at l'Elysée Montmartre, Paris - part 2
