= Gert Bettens =

Belgian musician

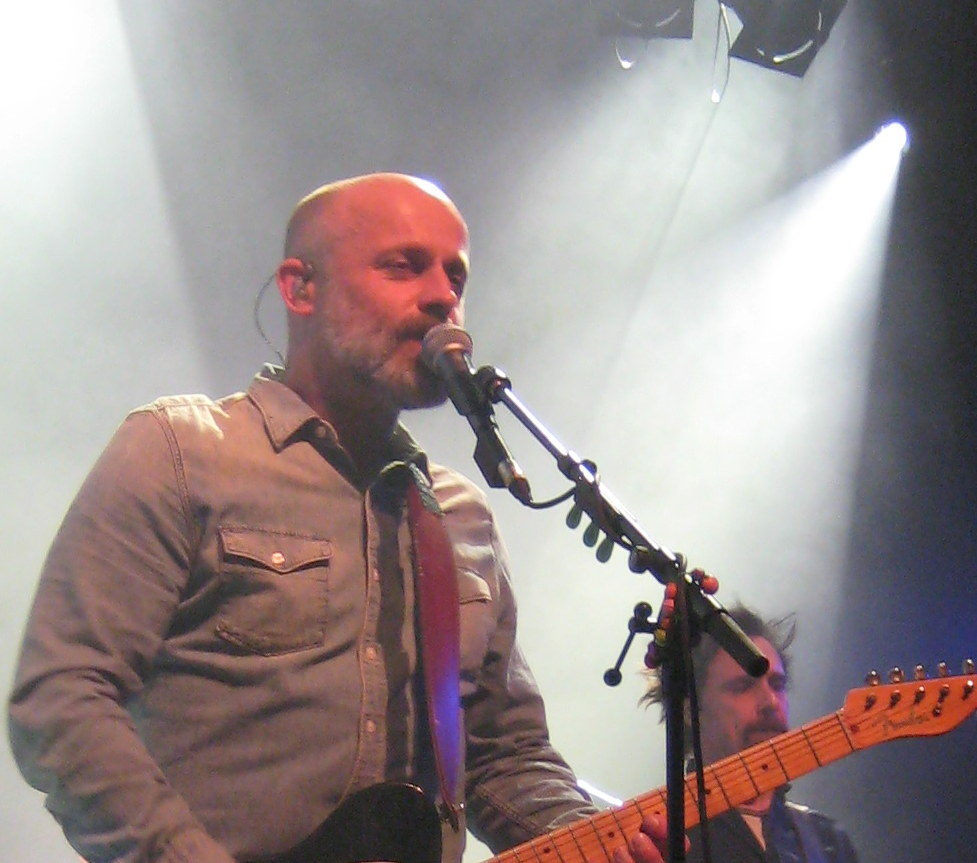
- Gert Bettens performing in December 2015

Background information
- Born: Merksem, Belgium
- Occupations: Songwriter; musician; producer
- Instruments: Guitar; vocals; keyboards
- Years active: 1994–present
- Member of: K's Choice, Woodface

Gert Bettens is a Belgian musician, best known as the guitarist of the Belgian band K's Choice. He, with his brother Sam Bettens, is the face of the band.

The band is popular in Europe and had toured in the U.S. with The Verve Pipe, Tonic, Alanis Morissette and the Indigo Girls, as well as on their own. In 2003 K's Choice decided to split ways, but then reformed in 2009.

Bettens was born in Merksem. After more than a decade of composing, recording and touring all around the world with one of the most successful Belgian bands, in addition to many side projects as a songwriter, guitarist and producer, Gert is making his comeback in the music scene with his first solo project.

Along with some other well-respected musicians, Gert founded Woodface. Written in his backyard studio and recorded at Jet Studios in Brussels, "Good Morning Hope" sheds light on the wide range of Gert's musical influences and tastes, blending power-driven rock with intimate singer-songwriter compositions. This contrast is probably the only similarity to his former band.

Driven by Gert's original sound and voice, there is a fusion of styles. The album stretches from typical 1970s rock-tinged guitar bands like The Who and Led Zeppelin to the dulcet sounds of Crowded House, The Smiths and The Beatles. Some songs embrace the drive of more contemporary critical favorites such as David Gray, Eels and the late Elliott Smith.

The colourful palette of sounds was recorded by Werner Pensaert who also engineered the K's Choice platinum record Paradise in Me.
