= The Glow of Love =

1980 studio album by Change

Studio album by Change
- Released: April 16, 1980
- Recorded: 1979–1980
- Studios: Fonoprint, Bologna, Italy; Power Station, New York City; Mediasound, New York City
- Genres: R&B; soul; disco; dance
- Length: 38:09
- Labels: RFC Records; Warner Bros.; WEA; Goody Music Records
- Producer: Jacques Fred Petrus

Change chronology
The Glow of Love (1980)	Miracles (1981)

Singles from The Glow of Love
- 1. "A Lover's Holiday" b/w "The End" Released: March 1980; 2. "Searching" b/w UK: "Angel in My Pocket" / US: "It's a Girl's Affair" Released: July 1980; 3. "The Glow of Love" b/w "It's a Girl's Affair" Released: October 1980

The Glow of Love is the debut studio album by the Italian/American ensemble Change, released in April 1980. It includes the singles "A Lover's Holiday", "Searching" and "The Glow of Love"; all three singles simultaneously topped the US dance chart for nine weeks from May to June 1980. The album reached number 29 on the US Billboard Album Chart and number 10 on the US Billboard Black Albums chart.

== Background ==
The band recorded the songs for the album at Fonoprint Studios in Bologna, Italy. Vocals were then recorded at Power Station Studios in New York City. "Searching" and the title track were recorded and mixed at Mediasound Studios in New York. The sessions were then mastered at Sterling Sound Studios.

The artwork was designed and illustrated by Greg Porto.

== Reception ==
Professional ratings
Review scores
Source	Rating
AllMusic	4.5/5 stars
Robert Christgau	B+

The Glow of Love received positive reviews from the majority of critics. Alex Henderson,, writing retrospectively for AllMusic describes it as a disco/R&B masterpiece and Change's most essential album. Nile Rodgers and Bernard Edwards' Chic sound is noted as a heavy influence but Henderson argues that "knowledgeable disco and R&B enthusiasts knew better; Change wasn't a carbon copy of Chic any more than jazz great Chet Baker was a clone of Miles Davis." "A Lover's Holiday" is marked as a playful opener, while "It's a Girl's Affair" and "Angel in My Pocket" are highlighted as "sassy and passionate," respectively.

Robert Christgau summarised the album as "New and true and gay" and "having the complete bag of disco tricks." He notes the influence of Chic in "A Lover's Holiday", describing it as a "Rodgers-&-Edwards rip." He also compares "The End" to the electronic music of Giorgio Moroder.

Reviewers also highlighted the album's showcasing of Luther Vandross. Ed Hogan, writing for AllMusic, described "The Glow of Love" as a startling introduction to Vandross' singing style. Henderson remarks that "the laid-back title song which Vandross sang on became a quiet storm radio favorite and demonstrates that not everything Change recorded was aimed at the dancefloor. Vandross had yet to secure a solo career in 1980, although many of the people who heard his performances on those two gems agreed that a solo career was inevitable."

== Sampling ==
- English alternative rock band Happy Mondays sampled "A Lover's Holiday" for their song "Holiday" in their 1990 album Pills 'n' Thrills and Bellyaches.
- Billy Lawrence sampled "The Glow of Love" in her 1997 song "Up & Down".
- Aretha Franklin sampled the song in her song "Here We Go Again" from her 1998 album, A Rose Is Still a Rose.
- Phats & Small sampled it in their 1999 song "Turn Around".
- Swedish group Alcazar sampled “The Glow of Love” in their 2000 song “Paris in the Rain”.
- Janet Jackson sampled "The Glow of Love" in her 2001 song "All for You". The song was co-written and co-produced by long-time collaborators Jimmy Jam and Terry Lewis, who would produce four songs for Change's 1984 album Change of Heart.
- Suga Free and Kokane sampled the song "A Lover's Holiday" in their 2021 single "SugaKane".

== Track listing ==
Side one
No.	Title	Writer(s)	Length
1.	"A Lover's Holiday" (a Jim Burgess mix)	David Romani, Paolo Gianolio, Tanyayette Willoughby	6:24
2.	"It's a Girl's Affair"	Romani, Gianolio, Wayne Garfield	5:29
3.	"Angel in My Pocket"	Romani, Gianolio, Willoughby	6:10

Side two
No.	Title	Writer(s)	Length
4.	"The Glow of Love"	Romani, Mauro Malavasi, Wayne Garfield	6:11
5.	"Searching"	Malavasi, Paul Slade, Willoughby, Wayne Garfield	8:01
6.	"The End"	Romani, Paolo Gianolio	5:54

1992 Compact Disc bonus track
No.	Title	Length
7.	"Searching" (Parkside remix)	9:03

== Personnel ==
- David Romani and Paolo Gianolio – composing, arrangement, conductor
- David Romani and Mauro Malavasi – composing, arrangement ("The Glow of Love")
- Mauro Malavasi – composing, arrangement ("Searching")
- Wayne Garfield, Paul Slade, Tanyayette Willoughby – lyrics
- Jacques Fred Petrus – producer, executive producer (for Little Macho Music Co., Inc., New York)
- Mauro Malavasi – executive producer (for Little Macho Music Co., Inc., New York)
- All songs featuring instruments played by the Good Music Orchestra
- Luther Vandross – lead vocals ("The Glow of Love" and "Searching")
- Jocelyn Brown – lead vocals ("Angel In My Pocket" and "It's a Girl's Affair")

Background vocals – Jocelyn Brown, Krystal Davis, Yvonne Lewis, Dennis Collins, Zach Saunders, Luther Vandross

- Maurizio Biancani – engineering (Fonoprint Studios)
- Bill Scheniman – engineering (Power Station Studios)
- Michael Brauer – engineering (Mediasound Studios)
- Ray Caviano and Bob Siegel – album coordination
- Greg Porto – album design and illustrations
- All basic tracks recorded at Fonoprint Studios, except "The Glow of Love' and "Searching" (recorded at Mediasound in New York City)
- Vocals recorded at Power Station Studios
- All songs mixed at Power Station, except "The Glow of Love" and "Searching" (mixed at Mediasound)
- Mastered at Sterling Sound Inc., New York City

== Charts ==
Chart (1980)	Peak position
Italy (FIMI)	22
US Billboard Pop Albums	29
US Billboard Black Albums	10
