= Peter Jacques Band =

Italian disco band

- Origin: Bologna, Italy
- Genres: Disco, hi-NRG
- Years active: 1978–1986
- Labels: Prelude Records, Goody Music Records, Renaissance International
- Past members: Jacques Fred Petrus; Mauro Malavasi; Davide Romani; Gabriele Melotti; George Aghedo; Leroy Burgess; Rudy Trevisi; Sandro Comini

Peter Jacques Band was an Italian disco band, created by French-Italian-American businessman Jacques Fred Petrus (1949–1987) and songwriter and producer Mauro Malavasi (1958–present). There was no one in the band named Peter Jacques, as it was a play on Petrus' own name.

== Overview ==
They released three albums all reaching minor success but most of all opened up the US market for Italian made disco. In 1979, their greatest single hit was "Walking on Music" from the "Fire Night Dance" album. All tracks from this album peaked #6 on the US disco chart. Other albums were, "Welcome Back" released in 1980 and "Dancing In The Street" released in 1985. All tracks from "Welcome Back" peaked at #57 on the US disco chart. After financial problems Petrus had less means and studio time to succeed with PJB and his other projects like Change and B. B. & Q. band. In 1987, while in Guadeloupe, Petrus was assassinated and a Swiss tourist was accused of murder. After which PJB vanished.

The band is considered one of the pioneers of Italian produced Disco music in the U.S. and Europe. Still, the style of the music of the band is not an Italo disco (a specific dance music genre that developed in Europe in the 80-s). It's rather a real, "traditional" (US-rooted) disco music produced in Italy. It's clearly reflected in its "cold" dance-style sound and upbeat rhythm, and in the fact that it was mainly marketed in the US, where it gained a huge popularity.

In 2007, Turbofunk (Patrick Alavi) released "Gotta Move" which was a remix of "Dancing in the Street".

== Discography ==
=== Albums ===
- Fire Night Dance (1978)
- Welcome Back (1980)
- Dancing in the Street (1985)

=== Singles ===
Year	Title
1978	"Walkin' on Music"
1979	"Fire Night Dance"
1980	"The Louder"
1980	"One Two Three (Counting on Love)"
1980	"Is It It"
1980	"Exotically"
1980	"Welcome Back"
1985	"Going Dancin' Down the Street"
1985	"Drives Me Crazy"
1985	"This Night"
"—" denotes releases that did not chart or were not released.

=== Compilations ===
- The Very Best of Peter Jacques Band (2007)
