= Sharing Your Love =

Studio album by Change
- Released: April 27, 1982
- Studio: Mediasound, New York City
- Genre: Contemporary R&B; Post-disco
- Length: 50:53
- Label: Atlantic, RFC Records, London Records, Polydor
- Producer: Jacques Fred Petrus, Mauro Malavasi

Change chronology
Miracles (1981)	Sharing Your Love (1982)	This Is Your Time (1983)

Singles from Sharing Your Love
- 1. "The Very Best in You" b/w "You're My Girl" Released: April 1982; 2. "Keep On It" Released: 12 May 1982; 3. "Hard Times (It's Gonna Be Alright)" b/w "Take You To Heaven" Released: June 1982; 4. "Oh What a Night" b/w "The Very Best in You" Released: 1982; 5. "Sharing Your Love" b/w "Promise Your Love" Released: 1982

Sharing Your Love is the third studio album by the Italian/U.S. ensemble Change. It was released in 1982 and reached number sixty-six on the US Billboard Album Chart and fourteen on the US Billboard Black Albums chart. Sharing Your Love includes the singles "The Very Best in You", "Oh What a Night", "Sharing Your Love", "Hard Times (It's Gonna Be Alright)" and "Keep On It" (in Italy only).

The band recorded the songs for album at Mediasound Studios, New York City. The sessions were then mastered at Sterling Sound Studios. Receiving mixed to positive reviews the album was originally released as an LP in April 1982. The artwork was designed by Greg Porto.

== Reception ==
Professional ratings
Review scores
Source	Rating
AllMusic	3/5 stars

Sharing Your Love received mixed to positive reviews by the majority of critics.

== Track listing ==
Side one
No.	Title	Writer(s)	Length
1.	"The Very Best In You"	Herb Smith, Mauro Malavasi	5:42
2.	"Hard Times (It's Gonna Be Alright)"	Mauro Malavasi, Davide Romani, Alfonso Thornton, Fred Petrus	5:21
3.	"Oh What a Night"	Robert Gaudio, Judy M. Parker	5:26
4.	"Promise Your Love"	Mauro Malavasi, Alfonso Thornton	4:28
5.	"Everything and More"	Len Boone, Larry Lafalce	4:21

Side two
No.	Title	Writer(s)	Length
6.	"Sharing Your Love"	James Robinson	6:03
7.	"Take You To Heaven"	Davide Romani, Johnny Kemp	5:26
8.	"Keep On It"	Kae Williams	5:38
9.	"You're My Number 1"	Leroy Burgess, Sonny Davenport, James Calloway	4:21
10.	"You're My Girl"	Mauro Malavasi, Davide Romani, Alfonso Thornton	4:07

== Personnel ==
- Jacques Fred Petrus - Producer
- Mauro Malavasi - Producer
- Jack Skinner - Engineering

Recorded at Mediasound Studios, NY. Mastered at Sterling Sound, NY.

Change

- James "Crab" Robinson - lead vocals
- Deborah Cooper - lead vocals
- Timmy Allen - bass
- Mike Campbell - guitar
- Vincent Henry - guitar, saxophone
- Jeff Bova - keyboards
- Rick Galwey - percussion

== Charts ==
Chart (1982)	Peak position
U.S. Billboard Pop Albums	66
U.S. Billboard Black Albums	14
