= List of Gimme a Break! episodes =

Gimme a Break! is a sitcom that aired on NBC from October 29, 1981, to May 12, 1987. There were a total of 137 episodes over the course of 6 seasons.

== Series overview ==
Season	Episodes	Originally released	
Season	Episodes	First released	Last released
1	19	October 29, 1981	April 1, 1982
2	22	October 2, 1982	May 5, 1983
3	22	September 29, 1983	May 3, 1984
4	25	September 29, 1984	May 11, 1985
5	24	September 14, 1985	May 10, 1986
6	25	September 24, 1986	May 12, 1987

== Episodes ==
=== Season 1 (1981–82) ===
No. overall	No. in season	Title	Directed by	Written by	Original release date	Prod. code
1	1	"Katie the Crook"	Howard Storm	Sy Rosen & Mort Lachman	October 29, 1981	101
In the series premiere, a series of events unfolds: Samantha comes home with a black eye, and Nell teaches her a few skills on how to fight; Julie and her friend are studying "where babies come from," and as the Chief comes home, he walks into the kitchen and finds them kissing; and finally, Officer Simpson arrives at the house with Katie, who was picked up for shoplifting. This led to a huge argument between Katie and the Chief, resulting in Katie being ordered to move out. Fortunately Nell helps the two reconcile by helping them coming to terms with losing Margaret. Note: This episode marks the first appearance of Howard Morton (Ofc. Ralph Simpson) in the series.
2	2	"A Good Man Is Hard to Find"	Will Mackenzie	Ted Bergman	November 5, 1981	102
Nell and her friend Angie go out to a singles bar. After a terrible evening having to deal with a variety of weirdos, Nell becomes depressed. This is when the Chief comes up with a plan to make her feel better. He fixes her up with one of his co-workers (Ray Vitte). However, the Chief quickly learns this may not have been the best idea.
3	3	"The Second Time Around"	Howard Storm	Coleman Mitchell & Geoffrey Neigher	November 12, 1981	103
An old high school classmate (Rue McClanahan) accidentally hits the Chief's squad car. Soon after, the two of them hit it off and begin dating. As their relationship becomes more serious, Samantha becomes worried that she will soon have a stepmother, however the Chief is in no way ready to consider re-marriage.
4	4	"Mom's Birthday"	Will Mackenzie	John Markus	November 19, 1981	105
The Chief comes home from work in a somber mood; mostly due to the fact that it is his wife Margaret's first birthday since her death. The Chief then takes everyone out to dinner at a Mexican restaurant in hopes that it will take their minds off their loss of Margaret. However, it seems that everything there reminds the family of Margaret; and Nell then helps the family cope by suggesting a way to remember Margaret on her special day.
5	5	"Do or Diet"	Linda Day	Chip Keyes & Doug Keyes	November 26, 1981	104
Nell has been dieting and to help her in her conquest, she has joined a weight loss group known as PORKO. One evening she holds one of the meetings in the Kanisky living room and the Chief is accidentally mistaken for a new member. This leads him to trying losing some weight himself. However, both Nell and the Chief soon find themselves battling temptation.
6	6	"A Man in Nell's Room"	Herbert Kenwith	Booker Bradshaw & J. Stanford Parker	December 3, 1981	106
When the Chief finds a man (Danny Glover) in Nell's room, he tells her he doesn't want her fooling around with guys in the same house as his teenage daughters. Nell decides to quit, and moves in with Angie for one night. The Chief tries to adjust to Nell not being around and everything goes awry. In the end, Nell gets fed up with staying with Angie and decides to come home.
7	7	"Your Prisoner Is Dead"	Will Mackenzie	Story by : Erik Tarloff; Teleplay by : Chip Keyes & Doug Keyes	December 10, 1981	107
While on an errand at the drug store, the Chief witnesses a robber hold up the place. When the robber turns his gun on him, the Chief shoots him in self-defense. However, when he finds out that the robber has died, he thinks seriously of retiring from the police force since he has never shot a person before. In the end, Nell convinces him to go back to work, when she makes him realize that he really is a pretty good cop.
8	8	"Julie's Rejection"	Dick Harwood	Ted Bergman	December 17, 1981	108
Julie wants to join Katie's club, and gets help from Nell and Katie on how to be cool, sitting, and dancing. When she shows up to Katie's group of friends, she totally messes up, as they ask her several questions about personal experiences such as kissing and virginity, and she is rejected by the club. In the end, she says she only wanted to be in the club because of the jacket they get, but cries hysterically, because she knows she cannot be like Katie and her friends. Katie decides in the end to quit the clique that she is in, and decides that she and her sister need to stick together.
9	9	"Julie's First Love"	Linda Day	Gene Perret	January 7, 1982	109
Julie goes out to get some air after having no luck finding a date to the Junior Prom. She ends up at the arcade, where she meets a worker there who is into electronics named Arnold and she asks him to the prom and he accepts. However, the Chief is mad that Julie returns home late and grounds her, not wanting to hear her side of the story. In the end, Katie realizes that Julie is at the arcade because she mentioned being out of quarters and the Chief decides to go down there, letting her know that he cares a lot for her and that he allows her to go to the prom with Arnold.
10	10	"Nell's Ex"	Linda Day	Kathy Joseph	January 14, 1982	110
Nell gets a call from her ex-husband Tony (Ben Powers), who is in town, and wants to meet with her. At the house, he tells her that he is going to be on The Merv Griffin Show and needs $1,000. Nell agrees to give him the money and lies to the Chief, telling him she needs $500 for her aunt to have an operation. The Chief gives her the money, even though he knows it is for Tony. When Tony auditions for the show, he gets cut short, and is told they already have enough male singers like him.
11	11	"Katie the Cheat"	Will Mackenzie	Jerry Ross	January 21, 1982	111
The Chief is counting on Katie to do very well on her college entrance exam, but she gets Julie to take it instead. The family is shocked to hear what has happened, after she declines the money they give her for her college life and confesses that she cheated on the test. The Chief is very upset, and then finds out it was Julie who took the test for her. However, Katie apologizes and decides to re-take the test on her own. Note: This episode marks the first appearances of John Hoyt (Stanley "Grandpa" Kanisky) and Pete Schrum (Ed Kanisky) and the only appearance of Elvia Allman (Mildred "Grandma" Kanisky).
12	12	"The Emergency"	Linda Day	Chip Keyes & Doug Keyes	February 4, 1982	112
When Katie comes home and collapses with a severe pain in her stomach, Nell rushes her to the emergency room. Once there, Nell meets a pushy receptionist (Liz Sheridan) and seeks a doctor on her own to attend to Katie. The doctor tells Nell that Katie had been using an IUD as a form of birth control, but she will be okay. Nell is shocked to hear the news, as is the Chief. The Chief leaves the hospital disgusted, but returns to visit Katie. The Chief asks Katie what would her mother think about her doing that sort of thing if she was still alive. Katie tells him that she and her mother had discussed it before her mother died and she knew that Katie had been using IUDs. The Chief understands that he cannot protect Katie from IUDs and other sorts of sexual-related issues, but he tells her he will always love her.
13	13	"Nell Goes Home"	Will Mackenzie	Booker Bradshaw & J. Stanford Parker	February 11, 1982	113
As he prepares to leave for an assignment in New York, the Chief forbids Samantha to go fishing with her male friend, because he will not be around to look after them; which angers Sam to the point of refusing to return her dad's hug before he leaves. After the Chief leaves, Nell receives a call from her mother telling her that her father had a heart attack. So Nell takes Samantha home with her to Alabama to be with her family. At her house, Nell is told by her mother that her father doesn't want to see her, but Nell is determined to see her father, anyway. In his room, Nell's father acts the way he did to Nell when she was younger, and doesn't mind that he is dying. He still doesn't forgive Nell for running away when she was sixteen. Meanwhile, Sam feels guilty and heartbroken over her refusal to hug her father before he left on his trip. In the end, Nell's father dies; and at his funeral, Nell is told to read the eulogy that her father wrote. He actually was happy that she came home to him after all those years. As Nell sings "Amazing Grace," the Chief walks in and Samantha runs to him, hugs him tight, breaks down in tears, and tells him she loves him.
14	14	"Samantha Steals a Squad Car"	Tony Singletary	Ted Bergman	February 18, 1982	114
As the Chief is preparing a speech for an awards banquet, Nell accidentally sits on (and flattens) his cap, which ticks him off. As the two begin to fight, Samantha comes home, trying to tell them that she had been involved in a schoolyard fight in which another girl insulted her by calling her a "dumb Polack" and hit her with a stick; but Nell and the Chief are too busy arguing. To get their attention, she asks Nell, "How would you like it if someone called you a nigger?" The Chief gets her attention, immediately threatening her with a spanking; a frightened Samantha runs into and locks herself in the bathroom, only to escape through the bathroom window, steal her father's squad car, and take off to the police station, where she meets a drunkard named Bill, who is out of his cell, drunk in the Chief's office. In the end, the Chief and Nell show up at the police station, and all is forgiven, as Nell tells Samantha that they should have listened to her in the first place, instead of fighting over a stupid squashed police cap.
15	15	"Grandma Fools Around"	Tony Singletary	Chip Keyes & Doug Keyes	February 25, 1982	115
The family prepares for Grandma and Grandpa's 55th anniversary at the Chief's house. Meanwhile, Grandma and Grandpa, at their home, are reminiscing over old photos and love letters that Grandpa sent her during his stint in World War II. After Grandpa reads a letter to Grandma he realizes was from someone else, and that Grandma had an affair while he was a prisoner of war for three years, he becomes angry, threatening to leave Grandma and wanting a divorce. Grandma then goes to see the family, devastated over their fight. The Chief then becomes upset with his mother, yet he goes to see Grandpa and brings him to the house. At the house Grandpa and Grandma do not speak, and Nell is fed up. After Nell tells them that she is divorced, Ed is a single bachelor, the Chief recently lost his wife, and they all wish they had someone to love; Grandma and Grandpa make up and get back together.
16	16	"Hot Muffins"	Will Mackenzie	Story by : Mort Lachman & Sy Rosen and Coleman Mitchell & Geoffrey Neigher; Teleplay by : Coleman Mitchell & Geoffrey Neigher	March 11, 1982	116
Katie's band is a big success in Glenlawn as they perform at amateur night at a restaurant. A big producer spots them, and tells them he loved the act, and offers them a job far away. Katie decides at first she wants to go, because she started her group, and without her, they would be nothing. However, Nell lets her see deep inside that all she wants to be is a star, and she finally decides to stay behind with her family, as her group goes off to see if they can make a success with their career. Crystal Bernard and Alexa Kenin play two of Katie's band mates.
17	17	"Sam's Affair"	Jim Drake	Chip Keyes & Doug Keyes	March 18, 1982	117
Samantha invites her friend and baseball teammate Scotty (John P. Navin Jr.) over for some television viewing. A love scene takes place on the show they are watching, and Sam and Scotty become intimidated and embarrassed by it. However, the love scene led Sam and Scotty to talk about kissing, and they decide to try it. As Julie and Katie walk in on them, they start to tease Sam and Scotty, saying that they have been "fooling around." When the Chief finds out, he tells Samantha that after she kisses a boy she will end up pregnant. Misinterpreting this remark, Samantha thinks she can actually become pregnant directly from kissing, which worries her. She then seeks help from Julie, Katie, and Grandpa; but they are not very good at offering advice on the subject. Finally, when Nell sees Samantha crying in her room, Sam tells Nell that she thinks she is pregnant, and Nell tells her never to believe what her father says because he is "full of it," and Nell decides to teach Sam the facts of life.
18	18	"The Robbery"	Dick Harwood	Ted Bergman	March 25, 1982	118
The Kaniskys come home to find burglars at work, when they return home from the Chief's "Law Enforcement Officer of the Year" award ceremony. However, Nell who was at a strip club, seeing male exotic dancers, returns home, tricks the robbers by saying there are jewels in the closet in a locked box, gets the Chief's gun, and saves the family from danger. When the reporter shows up, Nell tries to make the Chief look good, even though he was tied up by the robbers, and make it look like he was the hero, but finally, the Chief admits to the reporter that Nell is the real hero, and she did a very important deed for the family, for which they will always be grateful.
19	19	"An Unmarried Couple"	Will Mackenzie	Chip Keyes & Doug Keyes	April 1, 1982	119
Katie's friend Valerie (Helen Hunt) shows up at the Kanisky house, pregnant and due any day. She tells Katie that her boyfriend Jonathan (Paul Regina) had a fight with her and the two broke up and she has nowhere to go. Valerie is welcome to stay with the family, however, once the Chief finds out she is pregnant and split with her boyfriend, he does not tolerate this. When Jonathan shows up to see Valerie, the Chief insists that he and Valerie marry before the baby is born and he agrees. Valerie and Jonathan quarrel about marriage until he tells her he loves her and asks her and the baby to marry him. In the end, Valerie goes into labor and decides she is not having the baby until she and Jonathan are married. Julie rushes outside to find the neighborhood priest and the ceremony is performed. Shortly after the ceremony, as the ambulance arrives, Valerie gives birth in the front of the Kanisky house.

=== Season 2 (1982–83) ===
- John Hoyt was upgraded to the regular cast after recurring for the first season.

No. overall	No. in season	Title	Directed by	Written by	Original release date	Prod. code
20	1	"Nell Goes To Jail"	Jim Drake	J. Stanford Parker	October 2, 1982	202
While Nell is having a telephone conversation with Angie, they suddenly become disconnected, and a second later a technician from the phone company arrives and seizes the phone. Outraged, Nell pays a visit to the phone company to complain, stating she had paid the bill. However; Mr. Swackhammer (Jack Fletcher), the billing representative, states that the computer called Nell "Mrs. Fong," and that she is three months past due. Nell then becomes really furious and pulls Swackhammer's phone from the wall as he attempts to call the police about her protest about the bill. As a result, Nell winds up in jail, where inept Officer Simpson--who lacks typing skills--attempts to hunt and peck out a police report. Nell uses her one phone call to call Hamilton Storm, Glenlawn's TV news reporter, who rushes to the scene reporting from the "hell hole society calls a jail" that Nell had been wrongfully accused of not paying her phone bill. Mr. Swackhammer then gets a call from his boss, telling him to drop the charges on Nell, and Nell is free to go. Nell is then rewarded with lots of new phones for the house. The assistant technician who was called to the house to install the phones is none other than Mr. Swackhammer, obviously demoted from his office position.
21	2	"Brother Ed And The Hooker"	John Pasquin	Ted Bergman	October 9, 1982	203
At the bowling alley, the Chief meets up with Maxine (Arlene Golonka), a prostitute who helped him nail a bad cop. When Ed meets Carl at the bowling alley, he introduces him to Maxine and the two hit it off. When the Chief finds out that Ed and Maxine moved in together, he tells Ed that he will not have his brother living with an ex-prostitute since she has decided to retire from the business. In the end, Ed stands up for himself and Carl accepts his brother and Maxine living together.
22	3	"Sam's Imaginary Friend"	Jim Drake	Erik Tarloff	October 16, 1982	204
Katie and Julie go out on a double date as Samantha tells everyone to make room for Debbie Jo, an imaginary friend of hers. The Chief thinks she is acting like an infant at best and crazy at worst and talks to Nell about sending her for counseling. When the belief in Debbie Jo gets too far, the Chief grounds Samantha and goes up to her room and pretends to beat Debbie Jo up and tell Samantha that he doesn't want to send her for counseling. Samantha runs to Nell and says she hates her father and then tells Nell that Debbie Jo is her only true friend and that no one plays with her anymore since Julie is now developing a more grown-up social life and has no time for her anymore. Nell tells Samantha to tell Debbie Jo she has to leave and she agrees. She puts her inside of her jewelry chest as she says a tearful goodbye to her and tells her that her mom's picture will watch over her that she keeps inside of it. Nell comforts Samantha who is finally over Debbie Jo.
23	4	"Grandpa's Visit"	Jim Drake	Chet Dowling & Sandy Krinski	October 23, 1982	201
When Grandma leaves to go see her sick sister who is about to have an operation, Grandpa is sent to live with the family for a few days. When he shows up, he is nothing but trouble. He wakes up in the middle of the night, bangs a bag of ice cubes on the counter to crush them, causes the garbage disposal to go insane, spies in on a neighbor (Florence Halop)'s backside, and makes Nell's puzzle fall on the floor, only to vacuum it up and wake everyone up. Nell gets mad and tells Grandpa that he is causing nothing but noise. When the Chief tells him to stop doing the things he is doing, Grandpa leaves and goes to the mortuary. In the end, Nell shows up and tells Grandpa to come home and that she was sorry for acting the way she did to him.
24	5	"Take My Baby, Please"	Jim Drake	Ted Bergman	October 30, 1982	207
Katie's friend, Valerie (Bonnie Urseth) shows up at the Kanisky house with her new baby David. She tells the family that her husband Jonathan walked out on her. Valerie is serious about putting David up for adoption, since she doesn't have a job to afford him. Nell and the girls take Valerie shopping for baby supplies and leave David with the Chief, who grows attached to him. When the girls return home the Chief tells Valerie that they would have to kill him first before he lets her put David up for adoption and that the family will help her find a job. Nell then takes Valerie to a job interview to become a receptionist and uses her keen sense to drive off fellow competitors for the job. In the end, everyone is glad to hear that Valerie got the job and can afford to keep David.
25	6	"Porko's II"	Jim Drake	Chip Keyes & Doug Keyes	November 6, 1982	208
Nell hosts another one of her PORKO meetings at the house, where the head of the weight loss group shows up. When he arrives, the members of the group mock him for gaining all the weight he lost back. He tells them he is sorry and leaves. Afterwards, Nell blasts them for being so hypocritical and insensitive. Shortly after, Nell gets a phone call from him and realizes he is about to jump from the 13th floor of his hotel. Nell and the other members go to the hotel and get in the elevator but it stalls due to the weight of everyone inside. The elevator then safely makes back to the bottom floor as Nell takes the stairs and the PORKO members take the elevator. In the end, Nell talks him out of jumping off the balcony and everyone agrees to lose 2 pounds a week and stay on their diets.
26	7	"The Chief's Gay Evening"	Linda Day	Story by : Elliot Stern & Michael Mount; Teleplay by : Chip Keyes & Doug Keyes	November 13, 1982	209
The Chief goes on a stakeout with two officers where they are on lookout for an old-lady targeter. One of the officers (Frank Bonner) dresses up as a woman and stays out in the streets, while the Chief and the other officer (Eugene Roche) wait inside listening to the sounds on the recorder. The Chief cracks a few jokes with the officer about gay people and the officer is offended by this. He then tells the Chief that he himself is gay. The Chief says that he knows it 's not going to be easy for the officer to be known as a man who has "come out". In the end, the Chief is stuck in the bathroom when the other officer hears that the targeter has struck. He runs to stop the targeter and is wounded. The Chief finally is able to see that he is not a bad man after all.
27	8	"Katie Steals Julie's Jock"	Jim Drake	Story by : Fred Raker; Teleplay by : Ted Bergman	November 27, 1982	210
Julie invites a handsome boy from school (Scott Stradler) to come over to study with her, but he falls for Katie, and the two go out. When Katie comes home, Julie and her have it out in a hilarious catfight of sister versus sister. In the end, Katie finds out that the boy knew Julie was her sister all along and wanted to go over the house so he would get a date with her. Katie and Julie finally make up when Katie tells Julie what the boy told her.
28	9	"Sam Faces Death"	Jim Drake	Story by : Ted Bergman; Teleplay by : Chet Dowling & Sandy Krinski	December 4, 1982	206
Nell is out of town at her cousins funeral as Simpson storms into the house and says that the Chief was shot but is all right. The Chief is mad at Simpson because he accidentally shot him in his office when he showed a fellow officer his secret moves with his gun. As he shows the family how he performs the moves, he accidentally shoots the gun again and the bullet smashes into the fish tank, killing Gertrude the goldfish. Soon everyone learns that the Chief has an assassin against him as Simpson is interviewed on the news, telling everyone he saved him from being shot dead by his gun. Samantha becomes obsessed that God is taking too many people around her and begins to talk to him about why he takes people away. In the end, Sam talks to Grandpa and he tells her that she should enjoy life and take it slowly and not have to worry about death anymore. When Nell returns home from her cousin's funeral, Samantha fills her in on what happened while she was away and she cannot believe it, as Simpson shoots his gun again accidentally inside the house and the Chief runs after him with a club.
29	10	"Nell Goes Door To Door"	Linda Day	Tom Walla & Dave Wollert	December 11, 1982	211
Angie tells Nell that she is going on a trip to Mexico with the money she made by selling vacuums. She urges Nell to attend a gathering where the operator of the sales talks about how rich everyone is getting off of the product. Nell then has a party at the house and invites people to it and demonstrates the Amazo Vac. However, it does not work the way she intended it to, and goes back to another meeting and tells everyone that the salesman is a fake after doing research on him.
30	11	"Love Thy Neighbor"	Jim Drake	Ted Bergman	December 18, 1982	212
Nell is woken up in the early hours of the morning by their next door neighbor, Mrs. Falkenberg (Alice Ghostley)'s barking dog. When the Chief wakes up, he sees that she is asleep at the kitchen table and she tells him why she didn't get enough sleep. He phones Mrs. Falkenberg to come over and have coffee and Nell tells her about her dog. She then leaves and Nell goes outside to throw his dog doo inside a bag and light it on fire as he bites her and she takes the neighbor and her dog to court. At court, Mrs. Falkenberg says that the dog never bit anyone before, and the case is dropped, until Simpson shows up and says the dog had bitten two people before and the case is open again, Mrs. Falkenberg is sued, and the dog will be put to sleep. However, Nell changes her mind and drops the case when she hears about the dog being put to sleep for what he did. Mrs. Falkenberg tells Nell that she will keep her dog inside at night from now on.
31	12	"Love Kidney"	Linda Day	Booker Bradshaw	January 6, 1983	213
While playing the accordion at dinner, Uncle Ed falls ill and faints into the fish tank while cooling off. He ends up in the hospital and when he wakes up he finds out that he needs to have a kidney transplant due to not living a healthy life and a sibling would be the best bet for a transplant. The Chief talks with Ed and is worried about him and tells him he will do anything to help him get through this. Ed asks him if he'll donate his kidney to him and he agrees. Once the family hears this, Julie is against it, and slowly the rest of the family begins to get scared and they have thoughts on the Chief dying. The Chief tells Nell that if he does die in the operation that she can raise the girls and she will get the house. However, the operation is a success and everyone dances as Ed's doctor plays the accordion for the family.
32	13	"Julie Smokes"	Jim Drake	Story by : Lesa Kite & Cindy Begel; Teleplay by : Larry Rhine & Ed Jurist and Sandy Krinski & Chet Dowling	January 13, 1983	215
The Chief finds a cigarette in his sock and questions each of the girls about it. When he finds out that it was not Samantha or Katie, he tears through Julie's room and then apologizes when she tells him she would never smoke. However, she smokes as soon as he leaves the room and he catches her. She then moves to Grandma and Grandpa's after he hits her and it is up to him to get her to come home. He tells her that years before he and Margaret were smokers and he quit and so did she, but went on and off until it was too late and she got lung cancer and died. In the end, Julie realizes that is the reason why he slapped her and she agrees to come home and stop smoking.
33	14	"The Centerfold: Part 1"	Jim Drake	Ted Bergman	January 20, 1983	216
When Mr. Swackhammer shows up at the Kanisky house to inform the Chief about a female officer (Maggie Cooper) who posed nude, the Chief rushes into work and tells her she is fired. Once the town and the country get a hold of what happened, they are against what the Chief did. Even the girls and Nell don't like how he fired the officer. The police station begins to be mobbed by angry women who picket and are forced to leave, and Simpson's mother shows up and hits the Chief with her pocket book. If that was not enough, Hamilton Storm shows up to do a cover story on how unfair the Chief is, just as a mad bomber shows up and is about to blow up the whole place. Note: This episode marked the final recurring appearance of Jack Fletcher as Erwin J. Swackhammer.
34	15	"The Centerfold: Part 2"	Jim Drake	Ted Bergman	January 27, 1983	217
The man who has a bomb strapped to him tells Simpson he knows him from some place. He realizes that he has seen him before at the singles bar. They both talk about how they can never pick up women, and how Simpson likes a woman officer but he doesn't have the courage to tell her. The man decides at the last second to stop the bomb and tells Simpson he will look him up when he is done with his time in jail. Simpson then confesses to the Chief that he sent a picture of the officer from the Christmas party to the magazine and that is why they chose her to model in it. The Chief decides to take back his compliment of telling Simpson he is a hero. The Mayor of Glenlawn (Donnelly Rhodes) who is about to be re-elected tells the Chief to re-hire the officer or else he will fire him. The Chief decides to go to a live telecast taping with the Mayor and hires the officer back and tells the mayor he'll be voting for whoever's running against him. Simpson finally has the courage to tell the officer he likes her and she decides to go out with him. Note: This episode marked the final recurring appearance of Harrison Page as Hamilton Storm.
35	16	"The Custody Suit"	Linda Day	Story by : Kevin Hartigan; Teleplay by : Coleman Mitchell & Geoffrey Neigher	February 10, 1983	218
Aunt Blanche (Gretchen Wyler) pays a visit to the Chief on his birthday and threatens to take custody of the girls after seeing what looks like Nell and the Chief doing an indecent act in the kitchen, when she really was doing the Heimlich maneuver on him as he was choking on a piece of his sandwich. In court, Aunt Blanche breaks down, after Nell tells her that Blanche really doesn't want her to raise the girls because she is black. Blanche then decides to drop the suit in the end.
36	17	"The Return Of The Doo-Wop Girls"	Jim Drake	J. Stanford Parker	February 17, 1983	219
Nell tells about her singing past with a doo-wop girl group. Nell and her two friends, years before she met the Kaniskys, decide to audition to be singers. However, the man from the talent agency likes the other two girls, and refuses to let Nell be part of the group. Nell knows that the girls (The Pointer Sisters) are going to visit her and haven't seen her in years, and in the end she finds out they are fat like her, and lost their singing careers after they gained weight.
37	18	"Eddie Gets Married"	Oz Scott	Chet Dowling & Sandy Krinski	February 24, 1983	220
At the dinner table, Grandpa insists that Eddie should marry Maxine (Arlene Golonka), since they have been going together for six months, and she says that if he ever asked her she would agree. Due to this soft-fit proposal, he agrees to propose to her, and the two plan to marry. However, on their wedding day, Eddie locks himself in the bathroom, after he decides he needed time to think about all of this he is getting into. He tells Maxine that when he was thinking, he knew that he would rather be too old with her, then too old without her. She decides to take him back, and the two are finally married. Note: This episode marked the final recurring appearance of Pete Schrum as Ed Kanisky.
38	19	"Grandpa Robs A Bank"	Tony Singletary	Larry Rhine & Ed Jurist	March 3, 1983	221
Grandpa hides a letter from Grandma and she believes he is cheating on her. When she secretly takes the letter and reads it, she realizes that the apartment they live in is being converted into a condo and they need to come up with $60,000 or else they have to leave. Grandpa and Nell go to the bank and after the loan officer declines him for a loan, everyone mistakes him as a robber when he says he is going to "off" the loan officer, when he was really just turning off his hearing aid. The police are called, and the Chief tells the bank that his father and Nell would never do such a thing. Grandpa tells the man at the bank that he gave him the money when he was mistaken for a robber, but he would not give it to an honest guy like him. The man gives him a waffle iron and apologizes for the way he treated him. In the end, the Chief tells Grandpa and Grandma that they don't have to move since he made Simpson pose as a building inspector and found a lot of violations, forcing it not to go condo after all.
39	20	"Glenlawn Street Blues"	Jim Drake	Story by : Ron Roman; Teleplay by : Ed Jurist & Larry Rhine	March 10, 1983	214
When Samantha reads Nell part of her essay she is doing on the Chief for school, Nell tells her it would be a good idea to go to the police station and observe her father in his daily routine. When she gets there she observes several different scenarios. One scenario involves Mr. Swackhammer having a plumber arrested for stealing his toilet, which he claims flushes up and not down, since the plumber says he didn't pay for it after it was installed. Another scenario involves a teenage girl (Bonnie Urseth) that claims her dentist impregnated her while she was under anesthesia, but the Chief realizes it is a fake story and knows that she is only trying to cover up for her boyfriend getting her pregnant and he volunteers to tell the girl's parents which she agrees to. The final scenario involves a mother and father (Miriam Flynn and Robert Costanzo) worried about their missing baby in the supermarket. The father of the baby snaps and doesn't like the way the Chief handles the job. However, in the end, the child is brought to the police station by a mother (Lois De Banzie) and her daughter (Patrica Veselich) who has mental problems following an auto accident and didn't mean to take the baby. The father of the baby tells the Chief to arrest the girl and storms off after the Chief tells him there's nothing he can do. Nell arrives and tells the father of the baby that the Chief is a good person and he is doing his job right. In the end, Swackhammer's toilet, which is full of coffee from the broken coffee machine, sits in the station. The Chief wants to know what to do with it, and Nell tells him and Simpson to dunk their donuts in it.
40	21	"Nell and the Kid"	Oz Scott	Ted Bergman	April 28, 1983	223
While at "Max's Delicatessen", Nell and Max (Don Rickles) see a girl (LaShana Dendy) shoplifting. Nell saves her from being arrested, telling Max she is taking her home. Nell finds out she has nowhere to go since her parents left her and her grandmother had recently died. When the Chief finds this out, he is ready to arrest her, but she agrees to live with Max and help him out at the store. At first, the two don't get along so well, but they accept that each other has to get by even though there are people in their life that are no longer around. Note: This episode was a pilot for a proposed spin-off series, but NBC declined the idea.
41	22	"Nell Gets Sick"	John Bowab	Mike Miller	May 5, 1983	222
When Nell is sick at home and the Chief going off to Los Angeles for a meeting, he calls his mother to help out around the house. She shuns away Katie's new boyfriend (Michael Dudikoff) since he has pink hair, puts garlic on everyone because she doesn't want them to catch Nell's sickness, and feeds the family lamb with goat's intestines. Fed up by this, everyone forces Samantha to go to Grandpa and tell him to beg Grandma to return home and she falls head over heels for him. Note: This episode marked the final recurring appearance of Jane Dulo as Mildred "Grandma" Kanisky.

=== Season 3 (1983–84) ===
- Howard Morton was upgraded to the regular cast after recurring for the first two seasons.
- Joey Lawrence joins the cast starting with "Joey: Part 1."
- Telma Hopkins also joins the cast as Addy Wilson for a recurring role.

No. overall	No. in season	Title	Directed by	Written by	Original release date	Prod. code
42	1	"The Groupie"	Hal Cooper	Gary H. Miller	September 29, 1983	304
Julie wants to meet Andy Gibb and goes to see him after Nell lets her go, despite the fact that the Chief grounded her, only to be found asleep outside Gibb's hotel room. When Nell brings Julie home, the Chief sees that she has been out, knows that she disobeyed him, and plans to arrest Gibb and his group. However, Julie tells him that she fell asleep waiting for him, and the Chief forgives her.
43	2	"The Way to a Man's Heart"	Hal Cooper	Gina Goldman	October 13, 1983	301
Nell falls for James Roland, a former member of her weight group, who continues to go to the classes on weight loss. He is impressed by Nell's determination to lose weight, yet Nell seems to think he is in love with aerobics instructor Vanessa. When Nell decides to binge and pig out on food, Vanessa calls James for assistance. When he shows up at the house she tells James that Nell is in love with him. He asks Nell out and she accepts. However, in the end the Chief wants a break on his taxes and since James is in that business, he helps the Chief out. All goes well until Nell sees his tax return form that accidentally fell out of his briefcase and finds out that James is married with three children yet still loves Nell. Nell throws him out and shuts the door, telling him she is still going to go to the weight group each week.
44	3	"Katie's Commitment"	Hal Cooper	Gary H. Miller	October 20, 1983	303
Katie becomes involved with Michael, a college professor at Glenlawn Junior College who is much older than her. Nell begins to get upset at the man, when Katie introduces him to the family, and she gets mad at Katie as well, knowing that he is too old for her. When the Chief finds out that Katie is seeing him, he objects to it, and grounds Julie and Samantha for sticking up for Katie, but Nell tells him to accept her for her choice and she will remember that the Chief taught her right in life. In the end, Katie decides to go to away on a trip with the professor at a lecture he is giving, but she will stay with a relative instead, she tells the Chief that Michael proposed to her, but she is not sure if she will accept as she is not ready for commitment.
45	4	"Joey: Part 1"	Hal Cooper	Story by : Rod Parker, Hal Cooper & Arthur Julian; Teleplay by : Rod Parker & Arthur Julian	October 27, 1983	302
Katie practices her jazz routine to "Maniac" for a show that will be taking place soon in Glenlawn. As the family is getting ready, rehearsing for the show, a boy named Joey comes by collecting for Jerry's Kids. The family falls for his act, and as he leaves, Simpson says he is a con artist. Joey Donovan is his name, and his Uncle Jerry dropped him off and left him in Glenlawn, because his dad Tim is at sea. The social worker tells the Chief that Joey will stay with the family over the weekend and will be placed in a foster home shortly. Nell then loses control of Joey, and he escapes, taking her money, and goes to the bus station. However, Nell finds him, drags him home, and doesn't know what she is going to do with him.
46	5	"Joey: Part 2"	Hal Cooper	Story by : Rod Parker, Hal Cooper & Arthur Julian; Teleplay by : Rod Parker & Arthur Julian	November 3, 1983	305
Joey goes on a hunger strike and says he is not going to an orphanage. Nell then lies to Joey and tells him that she made a friend of a man whose window she broke years ago when she was a child. Joey believes her, and knows Nell is not a liar, like many adults he knows are. Nell then tells the Chief he owes her, and she deserves to take Joey in as her foster child. The Chief objects, but Joey tells him he is right, and even he himself would not want him as a foster child. The Chief's feelings change, and Joey is accepted into the family as their foster child.
47	6	"The Mayor"	Hal Cooper	Tom Biener & Ron Landry	November 10, 1983	307
The Chief invites the Mayor of Glenlawn over for dinner to impress him into dedicating him a new patrol car. The Mayor falls for Nell, who wants nothing to do with him. The Mayor tells Nell that the Chief will get his new patrol car if he can get her. At his condo, Nell gives the Mayor a taste of his own medicine by seducing him. The Mayor realizes he treated Nell wrong, and he apologizes. He then asks Nell for a date, but she declines, and tells him he will see her at the ceremony when he dedicates the new patrol car to the Chief.
48	7	"Melissa"	Hal Cooper	Arthur Julian	November 17, 1983	310
The Chief is awarded Man of the Year, and Nell tries to fix him up with a woman named Melissa. What he doesn't know is that she used to be a man, who was once Officer Simpson's karate instructor in St. Louis. When she knows it has gone too far, Melissa confesses to Nell, who has to tell the Chief she set him up with someone who used to be a man, which deeply upsets him, especially since they had so much in common.
49	8	"Nell's Friend"	Hal Cooper	Ron Landry & Tom Biener	December 1, 1983	308
While Nell is out getting the Chief's clothes cleaned; Addy Wilson, Nell's childhood friend, arrives at the house. She meets the girls, and reveals Nell's full name, Nellie Ruth. When Nell comes home, she is intrigued by Addy, and begins to think Addy considers her as a woman who is illiterate and failed in her singing career, and is now a housekeeper. Nell then goes to night school to get her diploma, but as fate would have it, Addy is teaching the class, and Nell instantly drops out. In the end, Nell flips out when Addy comes over and then the two reconcile, after a misunderstanding where Nell thought Addy said she was illegitimate is cleared up. Addy is happy for Nell that she is who she is, and Nell decides to re-enroll in night school to get her diploma. Note: Telma Hopkins (Addy Wilson) makes her first appearance in the series with this episode.
50	9	"Grandpa's Rebellion"	Hal Cooper	Ted Bergman	December 8, 1983	306
Nell, the girls and the Chief fix up the spare room at the house and await Grandpa's arrival home from his trip to Poland. When he returns home, he is in happy spirits about the trip, yet sad because he knows how much Mildred would have loved to go, but died not too long ago. When Grandpa finds out that he is to live with the family, he will not stand for it one bit, yet when Joey comes into the room and watches him pack, they talk about things they share interest in, which prompts Grandpa to stay and live with the family and room with Joey. In the end, the Chief—for the first time in his life-tells his father he loves him and they hug.
51	10	"A Kanisky Christmas"	Hal Cooper	Rob Kaplan	December 22, 1983	313
Joey's first Christmas might be a disaster if Nell doesn't get the whole family together. Samantha is going to babysit for a couple, Julie is going out on a date, and Katie is going skiing in the mountains. As Christmas night continues, the family surprises Nell, and tells her it was all a scam to have time to bring her Christmas present home for her, which was bringing Nell's mother to the Kanisky house.
52	11	"Herbie"	Hal Cooper	Arthur Julian	January 5, 1984	309
Herbie, Samantha's unseen new friend, puts ideas of Judgement Day into Samantha's head. An earthquake causes Samantha to freak out, and she says she is going to live every day as if it her last. However, during a storm, the Kaniskys' neighbor Wendy rushes over and gives birth, giving Samantha a new meaning to life.
53	12	"James Returns"	Hal Cooper	Gina Goldman	January 12, 1984	311
James wants to reunite with Nell after she meets him at a fancy restaurant during a girls' night out with Addy and Angie. She is upset though that her ex-husband, Tony, has run off and married an 18-year-old girl, and tells James she needs more time to think about getting back together with him. In the end, she decides to get back together with him.
54	13	"Samantha's Protest"	Hal Cooper	Bob Colleary	January 19, 1984	312
Samantha protests against demolition of a historic Spanish site after Nell tells her she did the same thing in Alabama when whites would not serve blacks. When the Chief and Officer Simpson arrive at the scene, the mob doesn't move, and they are all arrested, including the entire Kanisky family, who decides to step in and help Samantha protest. In the end, the site is saved from demolition, everyone is still mad at the Chief for arresting them, and they finally realize that he was only doing his job.
55	14	"Flashback"	Hal Cooper	Ron Landry & Tom Biener	January 26, 1984	315
When the Chief tells Samantha that she cannot go out on a date with a boy, Nell decides to tell the girls the story of how she met their mother and how she became a second mother to them. Nell goes to perform in California in 1974, and Margaret remembered Nell from when she saw her sing before and caught her performance. Nell then quits her job when her boss gets kinky with her, and Margaret takes her home to stay with her. She meets the family and she sleeps in Carl's room. When Carl comes home he is shocked to find another woman in his bed, and then grows sick of Nell, since she doesn't have a job. After a few days, a job offer in Bakersfield is thrown upon Nell, and when she gets the acceptance, Margaret tells her she is dying and wants her to raise the girls. She madly regrets it, but deep inside Margaret knows she loves the girls. Nell then refuses the job in Bakersfield and decides she will promise to be there for the girls from then on.
56	15	"Knock Three Times"	Hal Cooper	Mady Julian	February 2, 1984	318
Nell gets hypnotized to remember where she put Katie's ring for graduation, but she ends up remembering a whole lot of the girls' dirty laundry in the process, since the doctor forgot to remove the hypnotic trance, and whenever she heard three knocks, she'd tell the absolute truth. In the end, she tells everyone that she is going to marry James, but tells him the truth that she cannot marry him yet, that is until the kids are all grown up.
57	16	"Valentine"	Hal Cooper	Story by : Arthur Julian & Rod Parker; Teleplay by : Arthur Julian	February 9, 1984	314
Nell gives advice on Valentine's day to the entire family as she waits for James to come home from his visit to San Francisco. However, in the end the advice goes awry, since everyone's dates turned on them. Each date goes back to the house to apologize for ruining the evening, and Nell storms off to pick James up from the airport. When she gets home, the family tells her that after she left everyone made up with their Valentines and she promises not to be matchmaker again until Joey tells her he is having a problem with his girlfriend.
58	17	"The Big Apple: Part 1"	Hal Cooper	Story by : Gary H. Miller; Teleplay by : Tom Biener & Ron Landry	February 16, 1984	316
Nell and Addy go on Wheel of Fortune during Best Friends Week. Nell has $7,600 and wants to win a car. But after commercial, she accidentally says "Give me liberty or give me a car!" However, in the end, Addy gets $2,700 and solves it correctly "Give me liberty or give me death!" She buys a trip for two to New York. However, they are scared after the Chief says New York is not a safe place, and Nell thinks someone stole her suitcase as they take a man's who she thinks took hers. When they get to the hotel, they find out that it was not her suitcase at all, and that it was actually the man's. They find drugs and a gun in it and are worried sick that the guy will come back and kill them for taking it.
59	18	"The Big Apple: Part 2"	Hal Cooper	Rod Parker & Arthur Julian	February 23, 1984	317
Nell calls the Chief for help and he says he will tell a policeman friend of his about it and he will come up to New York as well, but his flights are delayed three times. Nell then learns that the man they took the suitcase from is a few doors down from them, and gets scared and escapes to get rid of it with Addy. The man is actually a policeman, and thought Nell and Addy took the suitcase for the drugs. However, the policeman who the Chief is friends with arrives and says that they are innocent and friends with a police Chief in California. The two policemen know they must protect them. Out in the street, Nell and Addy leave the suitcase and run to a taxi, but into Tony Randall instead, who lets him take his. Thinking they got rid of the suitcase, they go back to the hotel, learning that Tony saw their suitcase on the street and rushed it back to them. In the end, the policeman runs into their room as Nell decides to fire the gun so the police can hear it outside in the streets and run in to save them. However, they hear gunshots outside as she is about to do this, and the policeman runs in and explains everything, saying he is a cop, and that he used them as part of a drug bust, and that the shots they heard were the police getting the real criminals. As Nell and Addy leave for Glenlawn, the Chief arrives in New York, thinking they are still there. At home, they think Glenlawn is safe, but a guy holds them up and takes their purses.
60	19	"Rodeo"	Hal Cooper	Arthur Julian	March 8, 1984	321
After the Chief and Nell could not take Joey to the rodeo in town, an already-sick Grandpa decides to take him. But that day, it was raining and Grandpa came down with bad pneumonia. At the hospital, the whole family wants to see him, but the nurse instructs Nell that Joey is underaged. Nell then sneaks Joey in the hospital room. Joey gets out a tape recorder & sings "Swanee". Just when Nell and Joey have given up hope, Nell tells Grandpa that he has lost his will to live and if he dies she will have to tell everybody in Poland that he "threw in the sausage"! Grandpa wakes up and tells Nell that she will never be able to do that and that Joey misspelled Dixie. The two are overjoyed that Grandpa hasn't given up when they see he is up to his old tricks when a nurse comes into the room and he teases her.
61	20	"Katie's College"	Hal Cooper	Gary H. Miller	March 15, 1984	319
Rather than go to college, Katie wants to open her own business with a friend, which the Chief agrees to. However, Nell doesn't like the idea, because she promised Margaret that she would see all three of the girls go off to college. In the end, Nell tells Katie it is her decision only, and Katie decides to open up her own boutique with her friend, and decides she doesn't need college after all. Whitney Houston guest stars.
62	21	"The Center"	John Bowab	Jeff Franklin	April 19, 1984	322
Nell decides to take Grandpa to the senior citizen center to have some time to spend with people his own age. While there, the seniors find out that they have to share their space with the youth center since it had just burned down. The director has an argument with her new love interest, and it is up to one of the teens to help her and her new crush get back together to make his own crush see that he is a man who is full of love. At the dance that the two groups put together, the director and her crush reunite after being locked and handcuffed in a closet.
63	22	"Class of 84"	Hal Cooper	Ron Bloomberg	May 3, 1984	320
Nell helps write a book report for a straight-A student who has six kids and two jobs, and is always exhausted in class. At her graduation, the man she wrote the report for says he owes it all to Nell, and he cheated, and the two lose their diplomas. As this is going on, Addy has Channel 3 Action News do an interview with Nell, and she admits she cheated and didn't graduate. However, Nell is given her diploma, since she successfully passed all of her classes, and the man gets his as well, when he passes an oral exam, and he also gets a surprise from his wife that she is pregnant again.

=== Season 4 (1984–85) ===
- Telma Hopkins was promoted to the regular cast after having a recurring role in the third season.
- In the season finale, "Julie's Birthday", Jonathan Silverman joins the cast as Jonathan Maxwell.
- Final season of Dolph Sweet.

No. overall	No. in season	Title	Directed by	Written by	Original release date	Prod. code
64	1	"New Orleans: Part 1" "Joey Goes to New Orleans: Part 1"	Hal Cooper	Arthur Julian	September 29, 1984	403
Nell and Joey go to New Orleans where Nell sees her old flame, Charlie, a man she hasn't seen in 15 years. The two take Joey to the World's Fair, and when they go to visit a jazz club, he proposes to her. She is baffled by his proposal and doesn't know what to say. As this is happening, a man is watching Joey in the jazz club. When Joey finally sees him looking at him, he goes to Nell and tells her he thinks that the man is his father. The man happily says "Joey" as Joey says "Dad", and the two embrace, as Nell stares in shock.
65	2	"New Orleans: Part 2" "Joey Goes to New Orleans: Part 2"	Hal Cooper	Arthur Julian	October 6, 1984	404
Joey and his father reunite, and he takes Joey on a day at the World's fair. He then asks Nell if he can have Joey sleep on his boat, which she agrees to. In the morning, there is no sign of Joey, and Nell finds out the boat went back to Nome, Alaska. She and Charlie quarrel, and she madly accepts his proposal, but then ditches him in the end. As she walks along the boardwalks in New Orleans, desperately thinking of Joey, he returns to her, and reveals that his father had not absconded with him after all, but had sent him back to the hotel with a friend because his car had broken down and he looked all over for her once he had gotten there, and the two reunite in a hug.
66	3	"Nell's Birthday"	Hal Cooper	Mady Julian	October 13, 1984	401
Nell gets the birthday blues at turning 33. Addy is mocking her as the two are going on a cruise for singles 18-32 years old and Nell has to lie about her age. When the two return home from dinner, the family surprises Nell with a cake and tell her that her birth certificate says she was a year younger than expected. Nell is overjoyed, but Addy is mad, since Nell is now doing what Addy did to her by mocking her about her age. In the end, the kids tell Addy they lied just to make Nell happy, and Nell is accepting of the news, although still wishes she was younger.
67	4	"Grandpa's Secret Life"	Hal Cooper	Ron Bloomberg	October 20, 1984	405
An old Polish man finds Grandpa and tries to force him to marry his daughter. He finds out that Grandpa was the man that came over on the steamship "Krakow" in 1924, and that he and his daughter did the hanky panky together. When Nell meets the man's daughter, she tells her that she doesn't care about Stanley, and that she is afraid of her father. When Nell brings her to the house, she finally faces up to her father, tells him she doesn't want to marry Stanley, and says she is in love with an Italian man.
68	5	"Sam's First Love"	Hal Cooper	Ron Landry & Tom Biener	October 27, 1984	406
Sam is in love with a boy who just happens to be a big heel. He borrows money from the whole family, and when Nell tells him to leave the house, he and Sam decide to run off. Nell is shocked to find out that Sam's love Jeffrey had left her on the beach and had taken all of her money. Sam swears she'll never love anyone else, but Nell tells her it will only be her first love and there will be many more.
69	6	"Who Dunnit?"	Hal Cooper	Mady Julian	November 3, 1984	407
Nell and Ray Parker, Jr. have a difference of opinion over giving CPR to a fallen man. When the man dies, Nell and Ray decide to give a show for his wife. What they didn't know was that he was a gangster.
70	7	"Breakdance"	Hal Cooper	Arthur Julian	November 10, 1984	408
When Katie needs money for her business, Joey helps her out by breakdancing at the beach. Nell finds out Joey's grades are slipping in school, and when Addy finds sand in his shoes, she realizes he is going to the beach after school. When Nell gets there, Joey tells her Katie's business is in trouble, and she decides to help her by pawning the couch and TV set, which makes the Chief devastated to lose. Nell then says she will go back to the pawn shop and get them back.
71	8	"Daddy's Little Girl"	Hal Cooper	Rob Kaplan	November 17, 1984	402
While at Skipper Dwayne's for dinner, Addy finds out her car is being towed away as Nell is approached by a sleezeball who wants to go out with her. A man at a nearby table tells him to leave her alone and she is swept away by him. When he drops by the house while Addy is there, she is shocked to see that he is her long-lost father who left her mother when she was younger. Addy doesn't want Nell to date him after what he did to her mother and her when she was 8 years old. In the end, Nell takes Addy to dinner and her father is there as Nell sings "People" as Addy decides to give her father another chance.
72	9	"Carl's Delicate Moment"	Hal Cooper	Tom Biener & Ron Landry	November 24, 1984	410
An officer accuses the Chief of sexual harassment, takes the case to Addy's Congress of Determined Women, and plans on filing a lawsuit. The Chief worries for nothing when the female officer tells him she had a dream of him seducing her, and wakes up laughing hysterically, because she knows he is not the type of man who would do a thing like that and drops the case. The Chief finally gives her the assignment she had long waited for.
73	10	"Julie's Lie"	Hal Cooper	Mady Julian	December 1, 1984	413
Addy talks Nell into going to a ski lodge to meet a couple of doctor friends. While up there, Nell's date is called to help an injured skier, who turns out to be Jonathan (debuting Jonathan Silverman), Julie's boyfriend. Nell then finds Julie hiding in the bathroom. Julie and Nell argue over what has happened, and Nell apologize and finally realizes that Julie needs to be Julie and needs to accept her for who she is. Julie and Jonathan share an intimate moment together, as he tells her she is gonna be his first woman ever. Note: This episode also marks the first appearance of Jonathan Silverman (Jonathan Maxwell).
74	11	"Baby of the Family"	Hal Cooper	Gary H. Miller	December 8, 1984	409
Samantha gets upset at Nell, who disapproves of her going on a camping trip with teenage boys which will not be chapperoned. She gets increasingly angry at her when she favors Joey rather than her, and dresses Joey in blackface when he is to perform "Toot-Toot-Tootsie" in front of Nell's Congregation, as a way to get back at him. At the end of the episode, Samantha realizes the severity of her actions, feels deeply remorseful, and offers a tearful apology to both Nell and Joey. In 2005 TV Land ranked this episode # 38 as part of its "100 Most Unexpected Moments in TV History".
75	12	"TV or Not TV"	Hal Cooper	Ron Bloomberg	December 15, 1984	411
After being lifted by a class at night school on how TV tears families apart from one another, Nell decides to make the family stop watching TV for a night. However, once they make the promise, Simpson comes by and tells the Chief that the football game is on, since it is a special Wednesday night game, and Addy comes by to tell Nell that they will watch Dynasty, and to find out who Alexis's lover is. However, the Chief and Nell reject their offers and the family sits down just to chat about what is going on in their lives. In the meantime, Grandpa pretends to have a hearing-aid on as he and Carl listen to the football game on the radio, and Nell pretends to heat up a pie in the microwave as she sneaks the portable television set inside it and sneaks a peak at it as she goes in the kitchen to check on the pie. In the end, Nell finds out what the Chief and Grandpa did, as everyone finds out what she has done, and everyone goes back to watching television.
76	13	"The Spirit of Christmas"	Hal Cooper	Ron Bloomberg	December 22, 1984	414
Nell and Addy decide to spend Christmas in her apartment a few days earlier, since she is going to Alabama for Christmas, and will not be home to celebrate it then. As the night progresses, a neighbor of Addy's comes knocking on the door for cooking oil to make french fries, but when Addy and Nell find out he is not married, the two invite him to Christmas dinner, compete with each other to win his affection, and in the end, he decides to ask his wife to take him back.
77	14	"Grandpa's Will"	Hal Cooper	Arthur Julian	January 5, 1985	415
When the family tells Grandpa to go see a lawyer to make up his will, he refuses in doing so. In the end, Nell finds out he doesn't want to make out a will because he has nothing left to give his family.
78	15	"The Answering Machine"	Hal Cooper	Phil Mishkin	January 12, 1985	412
Nell is mad that her current flame is going on a business trip with another woman, so she leaves a nasty message on his answering machine. She then finds out the other woman is married, and regrets leaving the message, and forces Samantha and Joey to help her go to his apartment and erase the message.
79	16	"The Gift"	Hal Cooper	Mady Julian	January 19, 1985	416
Nell disapproves of Katie accepting a diamond necklace from her new boyfriend and tells her to give it back to him. However, when she is awarded the title of "Glenlawn's Woman of the Year", she is given a mink coat, and decides to wear it, as well as the necklace that Katie is to give back, to her gala ceremony, so that everyone will admire her, instead of her best friend Addy. However, when they reach the restaurant, a robber approaches Nell, and steals the coat and the necklace. Nell then goes hysterical to try and tell Katie that she took her necklace without asking her permission first.
80	17	"Alabamy Bound: Part 1"	Hal Cooper	Arthur Julian & Mady Julian	January 26, 1985	417
Nell, Addy and Joey go off to Alabama for Nell's sister's wedding. Nell is upset because her mother has not changed, and she is still ridiculing her. Nell is happy that soon after the wedding, she will be going back to Glenlawn, and will be away from her mother for good. However, Nell learns that after the wedding Mama Maybelle is moving in with her in Glenlawn.
81	18	"Alabamy Bound: Part 2"	Hal Cooper	Arthur Julian & Mady Julian	February 2, 1985	418
After hearing the news that her sister Loretta insists that Mama Maybelle move to California to live with Nell in Glenlawn after the wedding, Nell is not keen to the idea. Even when Mama Maybelle finds out that Loretta is planning on sending her to live with Nell in Glenlawn since she and her soon to be husband Howard will be living in Colorado in privacy, she is not keen either. However the Chief tells Nell that Mama Maybelle can move in because she talked Grandpa into moving in. Nell cannot believe his response. In the end, Mama Maybelle says she loves Nell, and was always looking out for her, but now all she needs to do is get a small one-bedroom apartment and she will be all set and will not have to get in the way of her daughters' lives.
82	19	"The Earthquake"	Hal Cooper	Rod Parker	February 9, 1985	419
Nell is having a very bad day, due to the fact that mechanic Sal Bonaducci charged her more money for her car being fixed, and the library charging Joey $1600 for a late book. When Nell goes to the library to straighten it out, there are several earthquakes. Nell is trapped in the basement office in the library with a woman who is deaf. She finds out that she and the woman have something in common, since they both wear crosses and worship God. In the end, the Chief shows up and says he will be cutting through the ceiling and rescuing them.
83	20	"The Lookalike"	Hal Cooper	Ron Landry & Tom Biener	February 16, 1985	421
Nell books Sammy Davis Jr. to appear to the town of Glenlawn, and sing for them. However, when she calls Sammy to ask him if he is arriving on time, he tells her that she had scheduled him for the following month instead. When Nell goes to the gas station to get her car washed, Albert, the man at the gas station is a dead-ringer for Sammy Davis, and she tells him if he appears on stage as Sammy to fool the town, she will give him what he has always wanted, Angie. However, in the end, Sammy does show up, and he and Nell sing You're Nobody till Somebody Loves You to the town of Glenlawn.
84	21	"Cat Story"	Hal Cooper	Ron Landry & Tom Biener	February 23, 1985	422
Officer Simpson's cat Sherlock is missing, and he goes out in the storm to find it. When the Chief returns home, he shows the family Simpson's clothes, and tells them that an eyewitness reported he saw a cat on a tree branch over the river, and an officer trying to rescue it. The family begins to believe that Simpson was the man who tried to save the cat, since he would do anything for his cat. Nell receives an envelope from Simpson which contains $5,000, and she is happy she can go on her vacation with Addy to Hawaii after all. However, in the end, Joey rushes into the house, telling the family that he found Simpson and Sherlock. NOTE: This episode was originally aired LIVE.
85	22	"Police Mamas"	Hal Cooper	Gary H. Miller & Ron Bloomberg	March 23, 1985	423
When the whole staff at the police station gets food poisoning, it is up to Addy and Nell to help them out. Simpson makes the two official police deputies, and there is a call that there are burglars at the Kanisky house. Nell and Addy, like scaredy cats, go to the house and check it out in the dark with flashlights, to find Grandpa and Joey home at the same time. In the end, two robbers leave Nell's room with a television.
86	23	"Monkey See, Monkey Do"	Hal Cooper	Gary H. Miller	March 30, 1985	420
The Chief gets angry at Katie after her friend who got a part in a play offers her apartment to her. The Chief also gets mad at Samantha for wearing a tactless outfit. The Chief confesses that Julie was always his favorite daughter because she thinks like him. This causes Nell and the girls to move to Katie's new apartment. When the Chief tells Grandpa that now this will give them time to get to know one another better, he gives him a face, and he and Joey go to Katie's as well. After the apartment is over crowded, everyone comes home and makes amends.
87	24	"Friendship"	Hal Cooper	Arthur Julian	May 4, 1985	424
Nell is angry that Addy has not called her in over a week, and is doing things with other members of the family and not her. When Julie tells her that Addy told her she is having lunch with Yvonne Anderson, Nell calls Angie, and the two decide to go to lunch at the same place. At the restaurant, Nell tells Yvonne and Addy that Angie is her best friend, and in the end, Addy tells Nell that she was busy with the Junior Symphony Orchestra, and didn't have much time to call her, and they forgive one another.
88	25	"Julie's Birthday"	Hal Cooper	Mady Julian	May 11, 1985	425
On Julie's 18th birthday, Nell has a plan to get her and Jonathan back together after they broke up. She keeps ordering pizza, and when Jonathan keeps showing up, Julie hides in the closet, only to have Nell tell him to deliver the pizza there. The Chief however is happy that Julie and Jonathan broke up, because he thinks he is a ditz. In the end, Nell tells Jonathan to go for it and tell her how much he loves her. The two run out of the house, and in the morning, Nell asks Katie where Julie is. Katie and Samantha tells her she never came home. Nell thinks Jonathan has kidnapped her, goes into the kitchen, and Julie and Jonathan walk through the door and say they were in Las Vegas. Nell is angry and thinks that they gambled, but Julie shows her a ring and says they got married. While they are in the kitchen, Nell hears the Chief say "Is that Julie in there Nell?", as she screams "NO!!!" Because she knows the two have some explaining to do to him. Note: This episode marks the final appearance of Dolph Sweet (Chief Carl Kanisky), who died from stomach cancer three days before its original airdate.

=== Season 5 (1985–86) ===
No. overall	No. in season	Title	Directed by	Written by	Original release date	Prod. code
89	1	"Joey's Train"	Hal Cooper	Arthur Julian	September 14, 1985	501
Nell is sad and doesn't want anyone to remind her of the Chief since he died. Joey receives part of a toy train the Chief gave him, and puts it in the Chief's room. Nell gets mad when Jonathan insists that he and Julie move into the Chief's old room, but gets extremely mad when Joey plays with his train in it. Grandpa says that Carl would have been happy that the family is still together, bringing him up in their daily discussions. He says that they all loved him, and that it is not right not to talk about him, because he was loved by them. Nell then changes her mind and lets Joey keep the train in the Chief's old room, and lets Julie and Jonathan move into it. Note: At the end of the episode, the camera focused onto the Chief's photo and, the screen slowly fades to black with no applause.
90	2	"Ship of Fools: Part 1"	Hal Cooper	Terry Hart	September 21, 1985	503
When a balloon payment on the Kanisky house's mortgage comes due, Nell reluctantly accepts her trumpeter ex-husband's offer to sing with his band on a cruise ship in order to make the payment. She, Addy and Joey all go aboard the ship and meet with Tony, and Joey, who befriends a young adult named Tammy. Nell finds out Tony has left his second wife and rekindles feelings for him while they rehearse Our Day Will Come (their favorite song as a couple), but doesn't know Tammy and Tony are now married and she is his third wife. Nell confronts Tony to tell him how she really feels and how she wants to get back with him again.
91	3	"Ship of Fools: Part 2"	Hal Cooper	Terry Hart	September 28, 1985	504
Nell continues to confront Tony about wanting to be with him again, following the advice Addy gave her earlier on telling him her true feelings, and sings "Angel" (from the 1983 Change album This Is Your Time) to him. But then Tammy shows up and Tony tells Nell he is married to her and they are on their honeymoon on the ship. Nell loses her voice because she is shocked Tony is married to another 18-year-old girl now, and she cannot sing for the gig unless she gets it back. She rests in her cabin room and then chases Addy throughout it and is upset at her. Joey then finds out Tammy is married, and she was the first girl he ever loved. Nell finally gets her voice back. A doctor comes by to check on Nell's voice and tells her she can sing in an hour's time unless she continues to talk, or else any amount of stress can close her voice up again. The doctor tells Nell to go on the deck and take in air and relax so she will be able to sing. On the deck, a guy is sick as Nell warms up her voice. As the guy is about to throw up, Nell gets in his way and he accidentally falls overboard. Nell gets shocked and loses her voice again, trying to get people to see there is a man overboard. Addy shows up and sees Nell trying to go over the railing and thinks she is going to commit suicide over Tony, but she is really trying to get to the guy who fell overboard to she plays charades with Addy to get her to see there is a man overboard. Addy finds out on her own the man is overboard when she notices him herself and tells Nell to forget the game of charades. In the end, Addy is mad at Tony that Nell cannot sing because of him, and Tony tells her Tammy dumped him for the social director. Nell finally gets her voice back and sings a Fats Waller-inspired medley of "Keepin' Out of Mischief Now" and "Ain't Misbehavin'" on the ship in front of an audience. Nell is happy she made $1,500 for her balloon payment on the Kanisky house by successfully singing on the ship. Tony shows up at the Kanisky house, and after Nell tells the family he lost his voice while she performed on the ship and is a sleazy guy, she takes all that back and agrees to go out with him again.
92	4	"The Man From Zoron"	Hal Cooper	Story by : Terry Hart & Mady Julian; Teleplay by : Pamela Norris	October 5, 1985	505
Joey is saved from being hit by a bus by a man (Ken Berry) who claims he is from the planet Zoron, and that on Zoron, they don't have last names, and is known as "Cute Dave". Nell then spends the rest of the time he is there, trying to trick him into admitting he is not really from outer space.
93	5	"Addy's Goodbye"	Hal Cooper	Mady Julian	October 19, 1985	507
When Addy tells Nell she is sick, Nell brings over some chicken soup to her apartment, only to find Addy having a party with a bunch of university colleagues. Nell finds out Addy was given a teaching job as a Dean at Columbia University by a professor she despises. Nell and Addy get into a fight at her good-bye party, and Nell does not want to say good-bye to her. However, in the end, she decides it is the best thing to do. She goes to Addy's apartment to say her good-byes, but when she gets there she finds Addy unpacking, only to hear that the professor took another job with an oil company, and turned down the job at Columbia.
94	6	"So Long Jonathan"	Hal Cooper	Mady Julian	October 26, 1985	502
Jonathan leaves on his archeological Mexican dig project. In the meantime, back at the Kanisky house, Julie finds out that she is pregnant with his baby after she decides to go to enlist in the Navy and fails the test.
95	7	"Mama"	Hal Cooper	Arthur Julian	November 2, 1985	506
Mama Maybelle arrives in Glenlawn to visit Nell, and tells her that she has to have an eye operation, and fears that she may never be able to see again. She tells Nell that she is going to miss seeing, but her sense of hearing may improve, which will help her hear Nell's singing better. Nell is happy that her mother admits she is a good singer. In the end, she is fine, and the family is there to greet her after the operation.
96	8	"Sam's Little Girl"	Hal Cooper	Joan Brooker & Nancy Eddo	November 9, 1985	508
Sam is taking the role of a big sister to a girl named Pam, a kid from a single-parent home. When Pam arrives at the house, Sam has other ideas of her own, when the new neighbor Chip shows up and asks her to light his pilot light on the stove. Nell is then stuck taking care of Pam, and she is a nuisance to her. Nell then finds out from Sam that Pam's mother left her father for a computer repair man, and Nell finds a way to make Pam like her in the end. The Jeffersons' Ebonie Smith plays the role of Pam.
97	9	"The Elevator"	Hal Cooper	Arthur Julian	November 16, 1985	512
Nell is upset when she finds out that Addy is engaged after only dating the guy a month. When she decides to accept Addy's engagement as a sign of happiness for her, she helps her select her wedding ring. However, when they begin to quarrel again over the engagement, they both go into separate elevators, and they break down. Nell gets on her phone and Addy gets on hers and they talk to each other about past times in Alabama to get them through this horrific moment. When Nell tells Addy she should call her fiance, his new girlfriend answers, and Addy decides to break up with him. Finally, the fire department arrives and gets them to safety. Note: Although, this was the 97th episode to be aired, this was the 100th episode produced. In the closing credits, Nell Carter announced to the live studio audience for the 100th performance of the show. The entire cast wheels out a cake in the kitchen to the audience celebrating the occasion and all blow out the candles for the five years of the show.
98	10	"Nell's New Car"	Hal Cooper	Joan Brooker & Nancy Eddo	November 23, 1985	511
Nell finds out Addy is selling her car, and wants to be the first one to take it off her hands. However, Angie's sister has already purchased it, and Nell talks her out of it. When Nell takes it for a test drive, it breaks down, and she tells Addy that she wants her money back. Addy refuses, but in the end gives in, after she finds out that she is getting money back as well for it.
99	11	"Nell's Gifted Child"	Hal Cooper	Julie Fleischer & Jeff Davis	November 30, 1985	510
Nell finds out that Joey is a gifted child, and should take a test to see what grade he should be placed into. When Joey tells her that the 4th grade is fine, and that he just wants to play baseball, she insists that he take the test, and gives him several instruments to play to see which one suits him best, the piano being the top. In the end, Joey runs off to the park, and Nell knows he is there when she finds out he was not at the school to take the test. She decides to let Joey stay in the 4th grade because a nine-year-old is supposed to have fun, and not work their tail off.
100	12	"Katie's Apartment"	Hal Cooper	Susan Beavers	December 7, 1985	509
Nell finds out that Katie is dating a married author of a famous book. She tells Katie to stop seeing him, and she tells her she is old enough to do what she wants. Katie then tells Julie to come to her apartment and asks her for advice on what to do. But Nell goes to a book-signing event the author is holding and tells him if he doesn't get out of Katie's life, she'll tell his wife about the affair. Katie is infuriated, and tell Nell she never wants to see her again. But after Nell tells Katie she only interfered because she loves her, they reconcile.
101	13	"Snippets"	Hal Cooper	Story by : Hal Cooper & Arthur Julian; Teleplay by : Arthur Julian	December 14, 1985	513
Nell and the gang decorate the Christmas tree as Joey pretends that he is sick, but wants to help out as well. During the Christmas gathering, the family recalls events from the past. In the end, Joey tells Nell that he was only pretending to be sick because he didn't have enough money to buy her a Christmas present, but she tells him it doesn't matter.
102	14	"Second Chance: Part 1"	Hal Cooper	Story by : Rob Kaplan; Teleplay by : Terry Hart	January 4, 1986	514
Nell decides to quit college and pursue a real singing career. She becomes the manager for an ex-con who wrote a song in jail and decides to put it to music. When Nell and the ex-con go to Skipper Dwayne's for amateur night to perform the song, Gary Collins is there, and Nell asks him if he liked the song. Gary says he hated it. When Nell goes backstage to tell the ex-con how he did, she freaks when he has a string of floss out and thinks he is going to kill her. She tells him that she thought he was gonna kill her because she hated his song. She backs into the corner in terror.
103	15	"Second Chance: Part 2"	Hal Cooper	Mady Julian	January 11, 1986	515
The ex-con is sad that Gary hated the song, and decides that singing is not the career for him. Nell then appears on Gary Collins' "Hour Magazine" show, and decides to go back to college after all.
104	16	"Bienvenido, Jonathan"	Hal Cooper	Mady Julian	January 18, 1986	518
Jonathan returns home from his archaeological dig, and pretty much ignores Julie, who believes that Jonathan doesn't love her anymore. Jonathan tells Nell that he knows that archaeology is not the career for him and that he rushed into things by marrying Julie and getting her pregnant. He tells her he was not at work when they called to talk to him, and instead he was in Bakersfield, looking at a chalk factory that he hopes that he and Julie will soon run in the near future. Nell tells him that Julie needs him, and he should tell his problems to her instead. He finally tells Julie his problems, and tells her that they will be great parents soon when their baby is born.
105	17	"The Gun"	Hal Cooper	Arthur Julian	February 1, 1986	519
While looking for an old photo album, Joey finds one of the Chief's guns, but accidentally shoots Nell in the foot instead. The whole family, including Mama Maybelle, help out Nell. However, Joey runs off every time he comes face to face with Nell. In the end, Joey wants to buy Samantha an ice cream cone after he accidentally hit her finger with a baseball, and Nell decides to take him to get it. When Nell starts the car, the engine backfires, reminding him of the gun, and he finally tells Nell that he is sorry.
106	18	"A Lesson For Nell"	Hal Cooper	Robin Pennington	February 8, 1986	517
Nell finds out that Grandpa is dating Sally Parsons, who is Nell's age, who was previously dating Officer Simpson. When Simpson finds out he is jealous, but Nell takes it much more personally, and tells Sally never to see Grandpa again. In the end, Nell learns that she should not have been snooping into Grandpa's life at all.
107	19	"Pride & Prejudice"	Hal Cooper	Pamela Norris	February 15, 1986	516
Nell thinks she is rejected for a job as a receptionist because she is black. When Addy decides to apply for the same job, she is rejected too. Addy has a friend from the Fair-Employment Office, and they bring him to Mr. Randall's office, but then find out that the man who rejected them is for black rights, and decided to hire a black man instead, because he cannot work with women because they drive him crazy.
108	20	"Family Reunion"	Hal Cooper	Joan Brooker & Nancy Eddo	February 22, 1986	520
When Nell's sister Loretta leaves her husband Howard, she comes to stay with Nell. She asks for Nell's advice, but Nell doesn't know what she can do to help. Mama Maybelle shows up and calls Nell a homewrecker, and Joey is mad at Nell when she grounds him from baseball because he is getting bad grades. In the end, Mama tells Loretta to go back to Howard, and she'll stay another week with Nell to give them time alone together.
109	21	"Getting to Know You"	Hal Cooper	Story by : Terry Hart & Mady Julian; Teleplay by : Mady Julian	March 29, 1986	521
Nell has a date with a foot doctor who doesn't like children and doesn't know how to tell Joey when she invites him to dinner. She tells everyone to leave for the night so she can be alone with him and introduce him to Joey. Shortly after everyone leaves, Officer Simpson leaves his cousin's adopted children with Nell to babysit for her because her husband re-located to L.A. for his job and they need to look for a place to stay. Nell agrees, but is in for a surprise when there are over a dozen of them from different countries, too, and also leaves their dog with Nell. She sends them all upstairs and to be quiet and sleep when her date arrives. Simpson calls Nell and tells her he will be a little late because there is someone threatening to jump off a building and commit suicide. Then Nell introduces Joey to her date, who is not pleased much by him and keeps his distance. When the kids come downstairs, Nell's date doesn't like it at all and gets up and leaves, but tells Joey it was nice meeting him and tells Nell that maybe sometime in the future he will see her again. Nell is upset at how everything turned out, but is pleased and cries when she hears all the children singing "What The World Needs Now Is Love" in front of the family piano, and when Simpson calls back to tell Nell he got the suicidal guy down safely and will be over soon to pick up the kids, she tells him to take all the time he needs.
110	22	"Katie's Korner"	Hal Cooper	Mady Julian	April 5, 1986	523
Katie, who has been sad since her latest boyfriend left her and is now engaged, is going broke and is deciding to close Katie's Korner. Nell knows that Katie is going to commit suicide because she is very depressed lately and gave Joey a gift for his birthday, which is not for several months, and is giving Julie and Jonathan her car. When Nell and Addy arrive at the closing of Katie's Korner, they see the lights off and know she is inside. They throw a tree through the window as Katie comes out. Nell tells Addy that she was worried about Katie because her ex-husband Tony left her years ago and she didn't leave him. Afterwards she tried to commit suicide but could not go through with it. Katie tells Nell she was offered a job as a buyer at Chadwick's in San Francisco which offers her $32,000 a year, as well as a company car.
111	23	"Found Money"	Hal Cooper	Terry Hart	May 3, 1986	522
When Nell's grandmother passes away and leaves her a nice amount of money, she splits it with the family, and tells them to spend it on something fun since it was found money. Shortly afterwards, Nell gets a letter from the bank saying the check bounced. In the end, everyone had bought Nell gifts with the money she gave them, since she is always giving them things and money every time they need it.
112	24	"The Purse Snatcher"	Hal Cooper	Arthur Julian	May 10, 1986	524
When Nell dines at a Greek restaurant with Addy, she is left alone when Addy has to leave for something important, so one of the waiters pairs her with another guy in the restaurant to eat with because they look like they'd look good together. Nell begins to fall for the guy she is paired with, then he leaves and her purse is missing. She suspects it was the guy she was paired to sit with, but the owners son doesn't believe it was him, and he and his fellow co-worker try to find out what happened, resulting in his fellow co-worker getting fired by the owner, Mr. Pappalardo. In the end, it turns out Nell had left her purse in the car and it was not stolen at all, and the owner's son and his friend who was fired go to the Kanisky house where Mr. Pappalardo is waiting for them and his son tries to convince his father to hire the guy back with a comedic skit on how he sent the guy to his grave by firing him, which he is successful in doing so.

=== Season 6 (1986–87) ===
- Kari Michaelsen, Lauri Hendler, Jonathan Silverman, and Howard Morton leaving the series after the season premiere.
- Rosetta LeNoire was upgraded to the regular cast after having a recurring role in the two seasons.
- Matthew Lawrence, Rosie O'Donnell and Paul Sand also joins the cast.

No. overall	No. in season	Title	Directed by	Written by	Original release date	Prod. code
113	1	"Sam Goes to College"	Hal Cooper	Arthur Julian	September 24, 1986	605A
114	2	"Sam Goes to College"	Hal Cooper	Arthur Julian	September 24, 1986	605B
Samantha, excited that she has gotten into Littlefield College in New Jersey, is let down when she receives a letter in the mail, saying that the school cancelled her scholarship. As this is going on, Julie and Jonathan, the proud new parents of baby Nell, are finally moving to San Jose to have privacy for a change, and to manage the chalk factory, as Simpson helps them with the move. Nell then calls Addy, who says she will do all she can to make sure it was an error, so that Samantha can get her scholarship back. While Samantha is in despair, Katie arrives home one last time to have her laundry cleaned before she moves to San Francisco, and tells Samantha to come with her and she will give her a job there. When Simpson arrives for another load of Julie and Jonathan's belongings, Nell tells him she is losing her girls, but Simpson tells her she will always have him. Nell continues to talk Samantha out of moving to San Francisco with Katie. She then realizes that Samantha is still 17, and she still has legal control over her. Addy finally calls Nell and tells her that Samantha did get the scholarship, and that it was a computer error. An excited Samantha decides that she is going to college after all. Nell finally sees Julie and Jonathan to the front door as they say their goodbyes. Nell knows that the girls are all grown up now, and that she has the house to herself. Note: This marks the final appearances of Kari Michaelsen (Katie), Lauri Hendler (Julie), Jonathan Silverman (Jonathan) and Howard Morton (Officer Simpson) in the series.
115	3	"Below Sea Level"	Hal Cooper	Arthur Julian	October 1, 1986	601
Nell and Joey fly to New Jersey to help move Samantha to her college dorm at Littlefield College, and also visit Addy in New York, who is now living there because she has gotten a job at a big university. Nell is surprised that Addy has a basement apartment, in which the view consists of being able to see tiny dogs and peoples feet who walk by. Nell gets furious when the construction workers outside make noise and she is not able to hear anyone, so she goes outside and gives them a kick on the leg. In the meantime, she is really worried about Samantha, who hasn't called her since moving into her dorm. Sam finally shows up in New York to go see a Broadway musical with a new guy friend of hers. Also, Joey is told that his father is in New York and has a big surprise for him. Joey is anxious and hopes that it is a puppy, but when his father shows up at Addy's, he brings Joey's surprise, his little brother Matthew. Nell as well as Joey are both shocked by this surprise. Note: This episode marked the first appearance of Matthew Lawrence as Matthew Donovan.
116	4	"Joey Meets Matthew"	Hal Cooper	Mady Julian	October 8, 1986	602
Joey finally meets Matthew, and is mad that he has a little brother. Tim says that he has some matters to take care of and will meet Nell and the boys at a restaurant. Nell and Addy then decide to take the boys to the park and they have a blast. As Addy and Nell sit and talk on a park bench, they realize that Joey and Matthew have disappeared and Nell calls the police. Joey and Matthew were taken to a museum by a police officer who tells Nell they are not fond of one another and are arguing back and forth. Later, everyone returns to Addy's, where Nell and Tim talk in private. He tells her he wants her blessing so he can raise the boys in New York, now that he has a job there. He tells the boys and everyone decides to go out for pizza. In the end, Joey returns to the apartment as Nell stays behind and finds out that she is not going to live with them and he cries. Nell tells him to keep her picture and she will keep his and they will know the other is fine when they look at it. Nell calls the airport for a flight back to Glenlawn and as she is in the taxi she recalls past times with Joey.
117	5	"Nell Goes Back To New York"	Hal Cooper	Mady Julian	October 15, 1986	603
Nell receives a letter from Joey in New York, telling her that he is fine, but she knows that Tim is not taking proper care of them. She returns to New York, where she ruins Addy's date with a lawyer, and tells her the two will get Joey back. She spies on him at the playground, and he sees her, and she tempts him with a big southern meal at Addy's apartment. Nell finally agrees to become roommates with Addy and move to New York. When Tim shows up to pick up Joey, he tells Nell he wants to go back to sea, and as much as he loves his boys, he has no time to be with them. He asks her to be their full guardian, and she accepts.
118	6	"The Apartment"	Hal Cooper	Terry Hart	October 29, 1986	604
Nell tries to get a job at a famous New York publishing company called MacDillon and Loud. She then decides to rent an apartment in Greenwich Village and gets a 3-year lease on it with an option to buy it without Addy's approval. When she shows Addy the run-down apartment, Addy hates it, and then in the end, decides to go along with Nell and move there with her when Nell gets a call about the reader job at MacDillon and Loud she receives. At their new apartment, still vacant and run-down, Mama Maybelle shows up and says Loretta, Jerome, and Howard have moved to New York because Howard got a job as a weatherman in New York City and she moved from Alabama to be with them. Note: Rosetta LeNoire ("Mama" Maybelle Harper) joins the cast.
119	7	"I Love New York"	Hal Cooper	Terry Hart	November 5, 1986	609
Nell is fed up with the new apartment in New York and tells Addy she wants to go back to Glenlawn to get some of that good California air inside of her again. When Grandpa calls, he tells her that he sold the house to leave Glenlawn behind and move to New York with her. She then meets her upstairs tenant Mrs. Jacoby, who bakes her a cake. In the end, Nell knows that if she can make it there, she can make it anywhere, after being inspired by Frank Sinatra's "New York, New York". Note: This episode marked the first appearance of Paul Sand as Marty.
120	8	"Nell The Boss"	Rob Dames	Terry Hart	November 12, 1986	610
After Addy is laid off at the University for going on strike, Nell hires her as an assistant at McDillon and Loud's publishing company where she works. When Nell thinks Addy is too slow at reading manuscripts, she fires her, and Addy, upset at Nell's attitude towards her, refuses to ever speak to her again. Note: This episode marked the first appearance of Rosie O'Donnell as Maggie O'Brien.
121	9	"Harry The Hamster"	Phil Ramuno	Mady Julian	November 19, 1986	611
Nell is furious when she hears a squeaking noise coming from Joey and Matthew's room. When she checks in on them, she finds out that they are caring for Joey's class hamster, "Harry", who Joey knows would most likely be used to be tested on human products. Nell and Addy decide to make a fund to stop people from testing animals with human products. Late at night, to stop the squeaking of Harry's cage, Nell pours salad oil on it. However, what she doesn't know is that it is rancid. When she gets another hamster for Joey, she is surprised that it is a girl who has just had six babies, making Joey change his mind about her, after he finds out she killed Harry.
122	10	"Joey The Gambler"	Patrick Maloney	Pam Veasey	November 26, 1986	612
Joey gets picked up by the police for gambling. After Nell brings Joey home, she tries to teach him that gambling is wrong, but he doesn't see why, since Grandpa bets on horses, Addy plays the lottery, and even the police had a football pool. When her lecture doesn't work, she finally confides in Marty, who uses the game "Candyland", as an example that it is wrong for Joey to gamble, bets Joey all of his money, and in the end wins, teaching Joey a lesson that it is very wrong for people to gamble their money that they worked so hard to get in the first place.
123	11	"The Scam"	Jules Lichtman	Rod Burton & Dick Frattali	December 3, 1986	607
As Nell and her mother are at the bank to put items into Mama Maybelle's safe deposit box, a con man shows up, tells Nell that there is a con man in the bank who is taking people's money, tells Nell he is a detective and to take her Mama's money out for the con man to take, then he will follow the guy outside and arrest him, but for Nell not to follow. When he doesn't come back, Nell realizes she was tricked, and Mama Maybelle is very upset. However, downstairs at Marty's restaurant, the guy shows up with a date, and Nell tells him she wants her money back, tells a waiter to alert the police, and brings Addy downstairs to snap photos of the guy. The officer doesn't believe Nell's story, until the guy says his name is one name, then the waiter calls him another name and he is finally caught for fraud.
124	12	"Christmas in New York"	Linda Day	Pam Veasey	December 10, 1986	613
Nell decides to buy a Christmas tree, as does Addy, who both know that it costs too much for one in New York. As the gang begins to celebrate Christmas New York style, Joey tells Matthew that there is no such thing as Santa Claus, and Nell blames Marty for the whole thing. In the end, Nell realizes that Marty always didn't believe in Santa Claus because he never got the toy train he saw in a store window when he was a child. In the end, Nell invites him to Christmas dinner, and on Christmas morning, he is surprised to see the toy train he has always wanted, which both Addy and Nell say they didn't get for him. Thus, proving to both Joey and Matthew that there is a Santa Claus after all.
125	13	"Nell's Secret Admirer"	Jules Lichtman	Arthur Julian	January 7, 1987	608
Nell gets a call from her high school secret admirer. She decides to meet him at El Gazpacho since he is in town, after she finds out that he cannot have a successful relationship with a woman because he has never forgot about her. While Nell is waiting at El Gazpacho, he calls her, telling her he wrote her a note years ago in school, and that he is afraid to meet her. Nell has an emotional breakdown on the phone with him, telling him that she is a wonderful woman who did make fun of the note he gave her years ago. In the end, he surprises her by showing up at the restaurant. This episode is out of order as it features the introduction of Rosie O'Donnell's character Maggie, who appeared earlier.
126	14	"The Loan"	Tony Singletary	Terry Hart	January 14, 1987	614
When Addy has a chance to go to a dance with the Prince and Princess of Wales she finds she does not have the money for an expensive dress, so Nell loans her the money only to find that Addy is spending it faster than paying her back. Will the two make up or will the friendship end?
127	15	"The Window"	Hal Cooper	Story by : Rod Parker & Arthur Julian; Teleplay by : Arthur Julian	January 21, 1987	616
128	16	"The Window"	Phil Ramuno	Story by : Rod Parker & Arthur Julian; Teleplay by : Arthur Julian	January 21, 1987	617
Nell has a better job in her company as a book editor. However, that tears her away from staying with the boys. When Joey tells Nell that he is doing a Walk-a-thon fund raiser for his school and wants to sign up sponsors. But Nell doesn't want Joey to go alone with Matthew wandering the streets of New York. But Grandpa disagrees. Joey also has to take Matthew to his guitar lesson as well. After school, Joey decides to go get sponsors, and takes Matt with him. When Joey goes to a doctor's office, he tells Matt to wait for him. Then Matt hears music coming from next door & sees a band rehearsing. Then the band lets Matt jam with them. Joey finds that Matt's missing and he searches all over for him. When he arrives home, he asks Marty for his help and Marty calls the police. Nell enters and Marty tells her Matt's missing. Nell takes the receiver while Marty looks at his restaurant. Nell is mad at Joey for losing his brother. Then Marty finds Matt and takes him home. Joey is mad at Matt for wandering off and Nell tells him he is 5 years old and Joey cries he is only 10. Nell feels guilty of not being there with the boys, and Joey is not talking to Matthew. Nell decides to quit her job so she could stay home with the boys. So Nell decides to get a new job instead. When she told Joey that, he was delighted. Then the phone rings and the company wants Nell to come to her interview. Nell tells Joey to watch Matthew, but he is still mad at him. So she calls Matthew and he comes with his guitar ready to go to a guitar lesson that Nell forgot. But Joey still will not take Matt to his guitar lesson. Nell's mom advises her to let the apron strings go, and to let Joey grow up. So while talking to Joey, she hears a puppy coming from Joey and Matthew's bedroom. They find the puppy outside the fire escape in a box, so she tries to get the puppy inside and her shoe's caught in the fire escape. Nell calls for Maggie to help. But she is scared of heights. Then a fireman comes and with a crowbar, gets her boot out of the fire escape. The fireman says that Joey's the hero who came to him asking him to bring his crowbar. Nell then tells Joey he can participate in the walk-a-thon.
129	17	"Joey's First Crush"	Linda Day	Terry Hart	January 28, 1987	615
Nell throws a party for BJ, Maggie's husband, who is serious about moving to Georgia to open a Bed and Breakfast. In the meantime, Joey begins to have a crush on Maggie and tells this to Grandpa. Nell sings "Georgia" to BJ and tells him if he transplants Maggie out of New York, she is like a flower and will die. Maggie and BJ fight at his party due to him being jealous of her boss, a fellow dentist, who actually is moving with his gay lover out of town. Joey talks to BJ in the end about what a jerk he has been to Maggie, he and Maggie make up, and Maggie kisses Joey on the cheek.
130	18	"Joey's Teacher"	Patrick Maloney	Pam Veasey	February 4, 1987	618
Joey is upset because his teacher, Mr. Gronimeyer hates him. When Nell invites him to the house to talk about Joey, he trips on Maggie's skateboard, and decides to sue, and fakes that he has serious pains. However, he is on his way to spin the big wheel for fast cash on television, and when Nell turns on the television to see him spin the wheel, he wins the big jackpot, and says that he is going to buy an island in the Caribbean, and will never have to look at another kid again.
131	19	"Joey's Hero"	Hal Cooper	Mady Julian & Terry Hart	February 11, 1987	619
When Joey's favorite television star "Captain Jerk", is hospitalized after swallowing a whistle, some of Nell's blood is used for a transfusion, since he has a rare blood type, and Nell has the same type as him. However, as she goes to his hospital room to meet him, she finds out that he is prejudiced as she overhears him talking to his co-stars about how much he hates blacks and how he organizes a group of people who are for a white society. She realizes that she must tell Joey the truth, that his favorite television star doesn't favor blacks. In the end, Captain Jerk asks Nell to be on the show, but swallows his whistle again when he sees she is black. He gives her money, and tells her to not tell anyone she is black and since she gave him 5 pints of blood, it makes him "42% Negro". Joey hears this, and despite not believing Nell before, he finally knows that his hero is prejudiced and he and Nell leave the hospital knowing that Captain Jerk is nothing but one.
132	20	"Joey the Gigolo"	Patrick Maloney	Joan Brooker & Nancy Eddo	February 25, 1987	620
Nell knows that her boss is beginning to fire many workers on the job, and when she finds out he has a daughter named Molly that is Joey's age, she sets the two up, so she can try to keep her job. What Nell doesn't know is that Joey is turning into a gigolo, leaving the family every day for Molly, even during Matthew's birthday party. In the end, Nell storms into Molly's room, and tells Joey to come home for his brother's party. When her boss comes in and tells her to stop yelling, she tells him she doesn't have to set Joey up with his daughter in order to keep her job. Nell is surprised when her boss tells her he is not going to fire her, since he just sold the company.
133	21	"Parents' Week"	Hal Cooper	Arthur Julian & Pam Veasey	March 4, 1987	621
134	22	"Parents' Week"	Hal Cooper	Arthur Julian & Pam Veasey	March 4, 1987	622
Nell finds out that it is Parents' Week at Littlefield College in New Jersey, and she is upset that Samantha didn't invite her to attend it. However, she decides to go anyhow. When she arrives at the college, Samantha is stunned to see her, and Nell begins to barge in on the students' lives. She sits in on an English class of Sam's, and Professor Dudley gets upset with her when he mentions the title of his book and she tells him her publishing company turned it down a while back. Afterwards, she meets a boy named Keith who wants to switch his career from teaching to fashion design, but cannot stand up to his father, who is actually Professor Dudley. As Sam and Nell are about to go to bed, Sam tells her a secret she has been keeping from her - she is in love with a student named Eric, and they are going to drop out of college and get married and move to South Dakota, where the two will live on a farm and he will work on his novel "The Hayloft", since he doesn't have enough money to stay in school. Nell drops to the floor when she hears this. Eventually, she changes her mind when she talks to Professor Dudley about it and he tells her to let Sam "Go, go, go", the same advice she gives to his son Keith who wants to go into fashion design. Nell tells Sam she can go to South Dakota but she must finish out the semester. Nell talks to Sam's roommate Linda, who tells her she is dumb to let Sam "Go, go, go". Nell then realizes she cannot let Samantha throw away her college education and must find a way to stop the wedding. Nell tries to convince Samantha to stay in college and not marry Eric while helping Keith stand up to his father, Professor Dudley, and Eric get his book published as well as having a college girl, a star player, decide to drop basketball for ROTC. However, things go bad for both Nell and Samantha as Nell learns that Eric is moving to Hollywood alone to write the screenplay for "The Hayloft", the novel MacDillon and Loud accepted and decided to publish after Nell sent it to them, and he will leave Sam at the college and write to her from Hollywood when he becomes famous. Sam realizes that Eric dumped her, and Professor Dudley has campus security escort Nell off campus for interfering with his son's career choice of being a fashion designer and getting into everyone's personal lives at the college. Note: This marks the final appearance of Lara Jill Miller (Samantha) in the series.
135	23	"Save the Church"	Tony Singletary	Pam Veasey	April 28, 1987	623
Nell prepares for Mary-Ellen Baldwin's arrival, a snobbish foe of hers from Alabama. She arrives in New York to tell Mama Maybelle along with Nell that she is knocking down the old church to make room for new condos. Mama Maybelle, displeased with the act of foolishness, rejects the check for $5,000 that Mary-Ellen gives her, but Nell wants the money. Mama Maybelle then decides she is going to Alabama to save the church. Once they arrive there, after Mary-Ellen tries to plead her case, Mama Maybelle goes off to see Mayor Watson about what she can do about the church, while Nell and Joey stay at the church. Nell tells Joey about her father and how he preached. In the end, she is amazed by her father's memories, and when Mama Maybele returns to tell her there is nothing she can do to save the church, Nell rips up the check, saying that she will fight for her father's church, even if she loses. Mama Maybelle is very proud of Nell for once in her life, since she finally made a right decision. Nell and Maybelle celebrate when Joey tells them Mary-Ellen's Rolls Royce is being towed away from the church.
136	24	"Someday My Prince..."	Patrick Maloney	Kathleen McGhee-Anderson	May 5, 1987	606
Nell is wooed by an African man who invented chocolate chip cookies in his African country. She is given a necklace by him, and is given a proposal to be his wife. She tells Addy that they should all move to Africa if she decides to accept his proposal, but in the end she declines it, when he tells her his mother wants him to marry a pure woman who hasn't had sex before. She is however, mad that she gave back the expensive necklace that she was given by him.
137	25	"Mama's Date"	Phil Ramuno	Terry Hart & Mady Julian	May 12, 1987	624
When Grandpa comes to get the boys' pajamas, since they are sleeping in his apartment because Addy is sick in bed, he tells Nell that her mother has a date. Nell wonders why her mother would have a date, and when her mother shows up, she meets her date, Ernie, a man from her past. It turns out that he was a jazz musician who knew her mother before she married Nell's father. When they were young, he took her to a dance contest, and asked her to go on the road with him, but she refused. Nell cannot believe that this is true. In the end, as Ernie waits outside for Maybelle, Nell asks her mother if the two of them ever had sex, and Mama Maybelle tells her that Nell should know the answer to that question, and tells her she has a lot of growing up to do, and that she must realize that her mother is a woman, just like herself.
