= Letter from My Heart =

1984 single by Steve Allen

- Artwork for most 7-inch vinyl releases

Single by Steve Allen
- B-side: "Letter from My Heart (Instrumental Version)"
- Released: 1984
- Genre: Italo disco
- Length: 3:33
- Label: Casablanca
- Songwriters: Franca Poli; Elisabetta Paselli
- Producer: Mauro Malavasi

Steve Allen singles chronology
| "Letter from My Heart" (1984) | "Message of Love" (1986) |

"Letter from My Heart" is the debut single by English singer Steve Allen, released in 1984, under the label Casablanca Records.

== Commercial performance ==
In Belgium, "Letter from My Heart" debuted at number 40 on the Ultratop chart on 9 February 1985, and reached a peak of number 19. In the Netherlands, "Letter from My Heart" debuted at number 38 on the Dutch Top 40, and reached a peak of 23 on 29 June 1985. The song reached a peak of number 22 in Germany, where it remained for two weeks, before spending a total of 14 weeks on the chart.

== Track listing and formats ==
- Italian 7-inch single

A. "Letter from My Heart" – 3:33
B. "Letter from My Heart" (Instrumental Version) – 3:26

- Italian 12-inch single

A. "Letter from My Heart" – 5:23
B. "Letter from My Heart" (Live Version) – 3:30

- Digital single (2011)
1. "Letter from My Heart" (Original 12" Version) – 5:25
2. "Letter from My Heart" (Instrumental Version) – 3:25
3. "Letter from My Heart" (Live Version) – 3:28

== Credits and personnel ==
- Steve Allen – vocals
- Franca Poli – songwriter
- Elisabetta Paselli – songwriter
- Mauro Malavasi – producer, arranger

Credits and personnel adapted from the 7-inch single liner notes.

== Charts ==
Weekly chart performance for "Letter from My Heart"
| Chart (1985) | Peak position |
|---|---|
| Belgium (Ultratop 50 Flanders) | 19 |
| Netherlands (Dutch Top 40) | 23 |
| Netherlands (Single Top 100) | 13 |
| West Germany (GfK) | 22 |
