= This Is Your Time =

This Is Your Time may refer to:

- This Is Your Time (Michael W. Smith album), 1999
- This Is Your Time (Change album), 1983
