= Turn on Your Radio =

Turn on Your Radio or variants may refer to:

== Albums ==
- Turn on Your Radio (Change album), 1985
- Turn on your radio (Michael Fall album), 2013
- Turn On Your Radio (Sproll album), 2008

== Songs ==
- Turn on Your Radio (Harry Nilsson song), from the 1972 album Son of Schmilsson
- Turn on Your Radio (Marc Cohn song), 1995 single
- Turn on Your Radio (Nina Gordon song), from the 2005 album Bleeding Heart Graffiti
- Turn On Your Radio (Sherry!), from the 1967 musical Sherry!
