= Goody Music Records =

Record label specializing in Italo Disco

- Parent company: Antibe Music
- Founded: 1975
- Founder: Jacques Fred Petrus; Mauro Malavasi
- Status: Active
- Genre: Dance
- Country of origin: Italy
- Official website: http://goodymusic.it/

Goody Music Records, originally Goody Music Productions (GMP), was an Italian-American record label. It was one of the pioneer labels specializing in Italo Disco music.

== History ==
It was founded by Jacques Fred Petrus & Mauro Malavasi in 1978 as Goody Music Productions (GMP). The same year they started a studio in Bologna and they produce their first record under Macho alias: "I'm A Man". Projects & Bands under this label were Macho, Revanche, Peter Jacques band & the most popular Change.

In 1980, it launched 2 labels: Avangarde, which focuses on Progressive Rock & New Wave music, and Nocedicoco, which focuses on Reggae music. Nonetheless, these 2 existed for a year and a half.

In 1982, Petrus sold it to an Independent Company & its name changed to Full Time Records. In 1996, it changed its name to Antibe Music. In 2005, Antibe relaunched Goody Music as a label for reissues.
