= Change of Heart (Change album) =

Studio album by Change
- Released: April 23, 1984
- Studios: Umbi, Italy; Creation Audio, Minneapolis; Mediasound, New York City
- Genres: Contemporary R&B; Post-disco
- Length: 40:06
- Labels: RFC Records, Atlantic, WEA, Five, Carrere Records
- Producers: Jimmy Jam and Terry Lewis, Timmy Allen, Jacques Fred Petrus

Change chronology
This Is Your Time (1983)	Change of Heart (1984)	Turn on Your Radio (1985)

Singles from Change of Heart
- 1. "Change of Heart" b/w "True Love" Released: March 1984; 2. "It Burns Me Up" b/w "Lovely Lady" Released: July 1984; 3. "You Are My Melody"" Released: August 1984; 4. "Say You Love Me Again" b/w "The Change Medley" Released: November 1984; 5. "Warm b/w "The Change Medley" Released: March 1985

Professional ratings
Review scores
Source	Rating
AllMusic	3.5/5 stars
Smash Hits	4/10

Change of Heart is the fifth studio album by the Italian/U.S. ensemble Change. It was released in 1984 and reached number one hundred and two on the US Billboard Album Chart, fifteen on the US Billboard Black Albums chart, and number thirty-four on the UK Albums Chart. Change of Heart includes the singles "Change of Heart", "It Burns Me Up", "You Are My Melody" and "Say You Love Me Again".

The band recorded and mixed the songs for album at Umbi Recording Studios, Italy, Creation Audio, Minneapolis and Mediasound, New York City. The sessions were then taken to Atlantic Studios, New York City to be mastered. The album was originally released as an LP in April 1984. The artwork was designed by Greg Porto.

== Track listing ==
Side one
No.	Title	Writer(s)	Length
1.	"Say You Love Me Again"	Terry Lewis & James Harris III	4:26
2.	"Change of Heart"	Terry Lewis & James Harris III	7:02
3.	"Warm"	Terry Lewis & James Harris III	5:00
4.	"True Love"	Timmy Allen	3:46

Side two
No.	Title	Writer(s)	Length
5.	"You Are My Melody"	Terry Lewis & James Harris III	6:22
6.	"Lovely Lady"	Timmy Allen	3:53
7.	"Got My Eyes on You"	Timmy Allen	4:34
8.	"It Burns Me Up"	Timmy Allen	5:03

== Personnel ==
=== Change ===
- Timmy Allen - Bass, Keyboards, Background Vocals, Lead Vocals (on track 7)
- Rick Brennen - Lead Vocals, Background Vocals
- Deborah Cooper - Lead Vocals, Background Vocals
- Vince Henry - Guitar, Saxophone
- Michael Campbell - Guitar
- Jeff Bova - Synthesizer, Keyboards
- Toby Johnson - Drums

=== Additional personnel ===
- Jimmy Jam - Keyboards, Synthesizer
- Bernard Davis - Drums
- O. Nicholas Rath - Guitar
- Bobby Douglas, Terry Lewis, Lucia Newell, Gwendolyn Traylor - Additional Background Vocals

== Production ==
- Executive Producer: Jacques Fred Petrus (for Little Macho Music Co., Inc.)
- Arranged and Produced by Jimmy Jam and Terry Lewis (for Flyte Tyme Productions)
- Tracks 4, 7 and 8 co-produced by Timmy Allen
- Recorded by Steve Weise and Craig Bishop at Umbi Recording Studio, (Italy), Creation Audio (Minneapolis) and Mediasound (New York City)
- Mixed at Media Sound by Michael Brauer (for MHB Productions)
- Mastered by Dennis King at Atlantic Studio, New York
- Gwendolyn Traylor - Production Assistant
- Steve Bogen - Album Coordination
- Greg Porto - Design

== Charts ==
Chart (1984)	Peak position
Dutch Mega Top 50 Albums Chart	24
UK Albums Chart	34
U.S. Billboard Pop Albums	102
U.S. Billboard Black Albums	15
