= A Lover's Holiday =

1980 single by Change

Single by Change

from the album The Glow of Love
- Released: March 1980
- Recorded: Recorded at Fontoprint Studios, Bologna, Italy. Vocals recorded & mixed at Power Station Studios, New York City
- Genre: Disco; R&B; soul
- Length: 6:26 (12"); 3:50 (7")
- Label: Warner Bros.
- Songwriter(s): Davide Romani, Tanyayette Willoughby
- Producer(s): Jacques Fred Petrus

Change singles chronology
"A Lover's Holiday" (1980)	"The Glow of Love" (1980)

"A Lover's Holiday" is the debut single by Change, from the album The Glow of Love. "A Lover's Holiday", along with the album's title track and "Searching" were very successful on the dance charts, spending nine weeks at number one - the all-time record. The three tracks were the most successful dance chart entries for 1980. Lead vocals for the tracks "Glow of Love" and "Searching" were performed by Luther Vandross. While "A Lover's Holiday" was a hit on the soul singles chart peaking at No. 5, and peaking at No. 40 on the Hot 100, "The Glow of Love" was the band's most successful single in Italy, peaking at No. 2 on the local hit parade.

== Track listings ==
US 7" single

1. "A Lover's Holiday" - 3:50
2. "The End" - 3:55

UK 7" single

1. "A Lover's Holiday" - 3:50
2. "The Glow of Love" - 3:40

US promo 12" single

1. "A Lover's Holiday" - 6:26

UK 12" single

1. "A Lover's Holiday"
2. "The Glow of Love"

== Personnel ==
- Arrangement and Conductor - Davide Romani and Paolo Gianolio
- Orchestra - Goody Music Orchestra
- Producer - Jacques Fred Petrus
- Mixing - Jim Burgess

== Chart positions ==
Chart (1980)	Peak position
Belgium (Ultratop 50 Flanders)	19
Dutch Top 40 Singles Chart	15
New Zealand RIANZ Singles Chart	24
UK Singles Chart	14
U.S. Billboard Hot 100	40
U.S. Billboard Hot Dance Club Play	1
U.S. Billboard Hot Soul Singles	4
