= Turn on Your Radio (Change album) =

Studio album by Change
- Released: April 1985
- Recorded: Recorded at Morning Studios, Milan, Italy. Mixed at Atlantic Recording Studios, New York City.
- Genres: Contemporary R&B; Post-disco
- Length: 45:05
- Labels: Atlantic (US), Chrysalis Records/Cooltempo Records (UK), Metronome (DE), Renaissance International (IT)
- Producers: Jacques Fred Petrus, Timmy Allen

Change chronology
Change of Heart (1984)	Turn on Your Radio (1985)	Change Your Mind (2010)

Singles from Turn on Your Radio
- 1. "Let's Go Together" b/w "Part of Me" Released: March 1985; 2. "Oh What A Feeling (Paul Hardcastle Remix)" b/w "Oh What A Feeling (Alternative Radio Edit)" Released: April 1985; 3. "Mutual Attraction (Remix)" b/w "Love The Way You Love Me" Released: June 1985; 4. "Examination" b/w "Part of Me" Released: 1985

Turn on Your Radio is the sixth studio album by the Italian/U.S. ensemble Change. It was released in 1985 and reached number sixty-four on the US Billboard Black Albums chart, and number thirty-nine on the UK Albums Chart. Turn on Your Radio includes the singles "Let's Go Together", "Examination" (in Italy only), "Oh What A Feeling" and "Mutual Attraction".

The band recorded the songs for album at Morning Studios, Milan, Italy. The sessions were then taken to Atlantic Recording Studios, New York City to be mixed. Receiving negative reviews the album was originally released as an LP in April 1985. The album was released with two different artwork designs. The UK version released on Cooltempo Records was designed by Greg Porto and the photography was by Robert Lewis.

== Reception ==
Professional ratings
Review scores
Source	Rating
Allmusic	2.5/5 stars

Turn on Your Radio received negative reviews by the majority of critics. Ron Wynn reviewing retrospectively for Allmusic marked the absence of a strong soulful-lead vocalist such as former Change collaborators Luther Vandross or James Robinson as a flaw. "The leads throughout this session, even on the lone successful single, "Let's Go Together," (which marked the group's final entry on the Billboard Hot 100.) were more efficient than distinctive". Wynn also noted that the production had faltered describing the arrangements of Jacques Fred Petrus as "recycled" takes on what had "once made the group a major act".

== Track listing ==
Side one
No.	Title	Writer(s)	Length
1.	"Turn on Your Radio"	A. Bagnoli, J.F. Petrus	5:15
2.	"Let's Go Together"	D. Romani, J.F. Petrus, P. Slade	6:06
3.	"Examination"	T. Allen	5:34
4.	"You'll Always Be Part of Me"	T. Allen	5:25

Side two
No.	Title	Writer(s)	Length
5.	"Oh What A Feeling"	D. Cooper, P. Slade, T. Allen	5:42
6.	"Mutual Attraction"	T. Allen	6:00
7.	"Love the Way You Love Me"	T. Allen	5:39
8.	"If You Want my Love"	T. Allen	5:24

== Personnel ==
- Jacques Fred Petrus - Producer, Executive Producer (for Little Macho Music Co. Inc.)
- Timmy Allen - Co-Producer
- Timmy Allen - Bass, Keyboards, Synthesizer, Background Vocals
- Rick Brennen - Lead Vocals, Background Vocals
- Deborah Cooper - Lead Vocals, Background Vocals
- Vince Henry - Guitar, Saxophone
- Michael Campbell - Guitar, Assistant Rhythm Track Arranger

Recorded at Morning Studios, Milan, Italy. Mixed at Atlantic Recording Studios, New York City.

- Carl Beatty - Mixing Engineer
- Dennis King - Mastering Engineer
- Robert Lewis - Photography
- Greg Porto - Cover Illustration (UK version)

== Charts ==
Chart (1985)	Peak position
U.S. Billboard Pop Albums	208
U.S. Billboard Black Albums	64
UK Albums Chart	39
