= Macho (band) =

Italian-American disco/R&B studio group

Macho was an Italian-American disco/R&B studio group. The Guadeloupe born French-Italian businessman Jacques Fred Petrus and Italian musician Mauro Malavasi, formed a joint production company, called Goody Music Production (GMP), in the mid-1970s. Their first project, in 1978, was called Macho, featuring Italian Marzio Vincenti as lead singer. Their only album was composed of three extended tracks. The band's sole chart success in the United States was an almost 18-minute-long disco cover version of the Spencer Davis Group's 1967 hit "I'm a Man", which was written by Steve Winwood. The track reached #6 on Billboard magazine's Disco chart in October 1978. An edited seven-minute version was also released.

in 1980 they released the album, Macho II - Roll, composed, arranged and conducted by Celso Valli, produced by Jacques Fred Petrus with all songs played by The Goody Music Orchestra. All vocals were recorded and mixed at the Power Station Studios in New York, except for the song "Mothers Love - Mama Mia", which was recorded and mixed at the Media Sound Studios.
