= This Is Your Time (Change album) =

This is Your Time

Studio album by Change
- Released: March 27, 1983
- Recorded: Umbi Studios in Modena, Italy; Sorcerer Sound, New York City; Sterling Sound, New York City
- Genre: Contemporary R&B; Post-disco
- Length: 45:02
- Label: RFC Records, Atlantic, Polydor, Memory Records
- Producer: Jacques Fred Petrus, Mauro Malavasi

Change chronology
Sharing Your Love (1982)	This is Your Time (1983)	Change of Heart (1984)

Singles from This is Your Time
- 1. "This is Your Time" b/w "You'll Never Realize" Released: January 1983; 2. "Don't Wait Another Night" b/w "Stay 'N Fit" Released: May 1983; 3. "Magical Night" b/w "You'll Never Realize" Released: 1983; 4. "Got to Get Up" Released: 1983 (Promo)

Professional ratings
Review scores
Source	Rating
AllMusic	2.5/5 stars

This Is Your Time is the fourth studio album by the Italian/U.S. ensemble Change. It was released in 1983 and reached number one hundred and sixty-one on the US Billboard Album Chart, and thirty-four on the US Billboard Black Albums chart. This Is Your Time includes the singles "This Is Your Time", "Magical Night", "Don't Wait Another Night" and "Got to Get Up".

The band recorded the songs for album at Umbi Studios, Modena, Italy. The sessions were then taken to Sorcerer Sound Studios, New York City for overdubbing and mixing. Receiving mixed reviews the album was originally released as an LP in March 1983. The artwork was designed by Greg Porto.

== Track listing ==
Side one
No.	Title	Writer(s)	Length
1.	"Got to Get Up"	M. Malavasi, P. Slade, R. Trevisi	6:02
2.	"This is Your Time"	L. LaFalce, L. Boone	5:49
3.	"Angel"	C. McKee, C. Valli, P. Slade	4:31
4.	"Magical Night"	L. LaFalce, L. Boone, M. Malavasi	6:12

Side two
No.	Title	Writer(s)	Length
5.	"Stay 'N Fit"	J.F. Petrus, T. Allen	5:30
6.	"Tell Me Why"	L. LaFalce, M. Malavasi, M. Campbell, T. Allen	5:21
7.	"You'll Never Realize"	M. Malavasi, P. Slade, R. Trevisi	5:46
8.	"Don't Wait Another Night"	C. Minucci, R. Matthews	5:51

== Personnel ==
- Jacques Fred Petrus - producer, executive producer
- Mauro Malavasi - producer, arranger, conductor
- Timmy Allen - production assistant
- Deborah Cooper - lead vocals
- James "Crab" Robinson - lead vocals
- Timmy Allen - lead vocals, bass guitar
- Rick Brennan - lead vocals, percussion
- Vincent Henry - guitar, saxophone
- Mike Campbell - lead guitar
- Jeff Bova - keyboards
- Mauro Malavasi - keyboards
- Rudy Trevisi - saxophone
- Bernard Davis - drums
- Toby Johnson - drums
- Bobby Douglas, Eric McClinton, Jocelyn Smith, Larry La Falce, Lisa Fischer, Steve Daniels - backing vocals

Recorded at Umbi Studios in Modena, Italy. Overdubbed and mixed at Sorcerer Sound, New York City. Mastered at Sterling Sound.

- Maggi Maurizio - engineering
- Alex Head - overdubs and mixing
- José Rodriguez - mastering

== Charts ==
Chart (1983)	Peak position
U.S. Billboard Pop Albums	161
U.S. Billboard Black Albums	34
