= Change (band) =

Italian-American post-disco group

- Also known as: X-Change (1992)
- Origin: Bologna, Italy
- Genres: Italo disco; dance; post-disco; Euro disco; R&B; funk
- Years active: 1979–1986, 1992, 2010–present
- Labels: RFC Records; Atlantic; Goody Music
- Members: Davide Romani; Mauro Malavasi; Tanya Michelle Smith
- Past members: Luther Vandross; Jocelyn Brown; Zachary Sanders; Krystal Davis Williams; Yvonne Lewis; Dennis Collins; Timmy Allen; Diva Gray; Deborah Cooper; James Robinson; Mike Dino Campbell; Rob Aries; Vincent Henry; Jeff Bova; Nathaniel S. Hardy, Jr.; Rick Gallwey; Rick Brennan; Andy Schwartz; Toby Johnson

Change is an Italian-American post-disco group formed in Bologna, Italy, in 1979 by businessman and executive producer Jacques Fred Petrus (1948–1987) and Mauro Malavasi (born 1957). They were heavily influenced by the disco band Chic. The current incarnation of the group formed in 2018.

== Career ==
=== Concept ===
Change was initially formed in early 1979 as a studio band with a revolving stable of musicians, led by businessman and executive producer Jacques Fred Petrus, with the majority of songwriting and production carried out by Mauro Malavasi and Davide Romani.

The band's dual Italian and American identity was a result of a production system in which the music, excepting the vocals, were written and recorded by Italian famed sound engineer Maurizio Biancani over the Fonoprint Studios, Bologna, Italy. These backing tracks were then sent to the USA where vocals were added by American performers, before being mixed into finalised versions in major studios such as the Power Station in New York City.

=== Immediate success ===
The band's debut album, The Glow of Love, was released on Ray Caviano's label, RFC Records (distributed by Warner Bros.) in 1980. It was composed by a small team of writers consisting of Romani, Malavasi, Paolo Gianolio (lead guitarist), Tanyayette Willoughby, Paul Slade, and Wayne Garfield. The first single was the million seller "A Lover's Holiday" featuring the ad lib stylings of Zachary Sanders, known then for his work on Schoolhouse Rock. The follow-up hits from the album, "Searching" and the title song, feature lead vocals by Luther Vandross who had yet to come to prominence. The three songs combined set an all-time record, spending nine weeks at #1 on Billboard's Club Play Singles chart, enough to make it the No. 1 disco recording of the year, and a strong seller in the U.S. It also made the Pop Top 40 that summer. The success of "Searching" and "The Glow of Love" exposed Luther's voice to the mainstream, and led to a successful solo career soon afterward.

At the time The Glow of Love was released, the group also drew comparisons to another disco act at the time, Chic, who were not only Change's labelmates at Atlantic Records in the US, but also shared their backing vocalists.

The follow-up album Miracles was released in 1981. It was created by the same collection of writers and producers as had worked on the debut album. Due to contractual differences, Vandross was unable to sing lead vocals on any of the album's tracks, and only performed backing vocals on select songs. After Miracles, Vandross continued to provide backing vocals for the group until 1981, when he left Change to pursue his solo career. Petrus and Malavasi signed up James 'Crab' Robinson to replace Vandross, owing to his ability to perform in a similar vocal style. Robinson shared vocals with Diva Gray for the album.

Miracles was released to a similar level of success as the début, though it did not manage to produce a mainstream crossover hit such as "A Lover’s Holiday." The three singles from the album, "Paradise," "Hold Tight," and "Heaven of My Life" all reached number one on the Billboard Club Play Singles chart in 1981.

Change's 1982 album Sharing Your Love moved the band further away from disco and club music and into genres such as R&B and Funk. The lead single, "The Very Best in You," was one of the foremost examples of the group's take on R&B. The album also marked a new process in the writing of the band's albums. The team behind the first albums contributing less, instead enlisting the efforts of a wide range of other writers. Overall, the album continued a slowly declining trend in the commercial fortunes for the project, though the album sold well, and "The Very Best in You" was popular.

=== Mixed fortunes ===
During the recording of and touring for their fourth album, This Is Your Time (1983), Change's relatively stable line-up of performers, writers, and producers, as well as their commercial success, faltered. The album failed to chart a major hit, with the title track flopping in comparison to previous lead singles. After the album's release Rick Brennan stepped into the Robinson's role, who left to pursue a solo career, while producers Davide Romani and Mauro Malavasi departed for other projects.

Simultaneous to these important departures, Change was bolstered by the contributions of bassist and songwriter Timmy Allen and returning vocalist Deborah Cooper, now promoted to lead, both of whom remained in the band until its demise. After Change, Cooper worked with C+C Music Factory in the 1990s.

The failure of the 1983 album left the future of Change in jeopardy. Petrus wisely hired recently sacked Time members Jimmy Jam and Terry Lewis to write and produce what would become Change of Heart in 1984.

The album did well internationally, returning the group to the charts in Europe and the USA. The title track became Change's first top-ten R&B hit in three years. Unlike former Change albums, which employed a large number of songwriters, Change of Heart was written by just three writers; four tracks were by Jimmy Jam and Terry Lewis, while the remaining four were the work of Timmy Allen.

Nevertheless, Allen was given the opportunity by Petrus to write and produce the majority of what became Change's final album in 1985, Turn on Your Radio. This album bore little of the polished dance and R&B sound that the group had always emphasised, and was even less successful than This Is Your Time, though Europe remained receptive to the group. The band's final US hit "Let's Go Together" was notable as it was co-written by Petrus with returning collaborators Davide Romani and Paul Slade.

=== Demise and future ===
Turn on Your Radio was Change's commercial low point, but had not been intended as the act's final release. The formal end came after the death of Petrus in 1987.

While the original Change disappeared after Petrus’ death, Davide Romani, Mike Francis (Francesco Puccioni), and Patrick Boothe attempted to revive the project in 1990. This new Change project was planned for a release on BMG North America under the name X-Change in 1992, but due to budgetary issues, the album was left unreleased.

The availability of the X-Change recordings was resolved in 2009 after Romani closed a deal with Italian label Fonte Records to release the album later that year as Change Your Mind. It was produced by Romani and Puccioni, written by Romani, Puccioni and Boothe, with Boothe as the main lead vocalist.

In 2001, American R&B/pop singer Janet Jackson featured a sample of Change's "The Glow of Love" in her number 1 single All for You.

In 2018, Change returned with original members Davide Romani and Mauro Malavasi, and new vocalist Tanya Michelle Smith. The reformed act also released their first single and video, "Hit or Miss," in June 2018, which is the lead-off track from "Love 4 Love," a nine-song set that was released September 7, 2018.

In May 2025, the album Embrace was released, featuring singer Tanya Michelle.

== Lineup ==
Change was effectively a studio group composed of session musicians and a core group of collaborators led by Jacques Fred Petrus and Mauro Malavasi. After the release of The Glow of Love and Miracles, Petrus sought to give the group more of an image and put together a group for promotion and live performances. This second lineup was relatively stable, and contributed to the group's subsequent four albums. Since their final album, there have been tours and shows featuring a revolving list of musicians and singers carrying on the Change name.

First lineup (1980–1981)

- Luther Vandross – lead vocals, background vocals
- Jocelyn Shaw – lead vocals
- Krystal Davis – duo with Yvonne Lewis on "The Glow of Love" and background vocals, first album
- Yvonne Lewis – group vocals on "The Glow of Love"
- Dennis Collins – group vocals on "The Glow of Love," "Miracles" and "Sharing Your Love"
- Zachary Saunders – group vocals on "The Glow of Love" and "A Lover's Holiday"
- Diva Gray – lead vocals
- James "Crab" Robinson – lead vocals (1981)
- David Romani – bass
- Paolo Gianolo – guitar
- Rudy Trevisi – saxophone (1981)
- Sandro Comini - Trombone
- Gabriele " Lele " Melotti - drums
- Doc Powell – guitar
- Larry McRae – bass (1981)
- Terry Silverlight – drums
- Leno Reyes – drums
- Onaje Allan Gumbs – keyboards
- Andy Schwartz – keyboards
- Nathaniel S. Hardy, Jr. – keyboards
- Maurizio Biancani – synthesizer

Second Lineup (1982–1985)

- Deborah Cooper – lead vocals
- James "Crab" Robinson – lead vocals (1982–83)
- Rick Brennan – lead vocals, percussion (1983–85)
- Timmy Allen – bass, keyboards, synthesizer, background vocals
- Vincent Henry – guitar, saxophone
- Michael Campbell – guitar
- Jeff Bova – keyboards
- Rob Aries – piano and synth
- Toby Johnson – drums (1983–84)
- Rudy Trevisi – saxophone (1983)
- Bernard Davis – drums (1983)
- Carole Sylvan – background vocals (1982–1983)
- John Adams – musical director, keyboards (1982–1983)
- Mary Seymour – background vocals (1982–1983)

== Discography ==
Change discography
- Studio albums: 8
- Compilation albums: 9
- Singles: 25

The Change discography includes eight studio albums, nine compilations, and twenty-five singles.

=== Albums ===
Year	Album	Peak chart positions					Certifications
Year	Album	US	US R&B	ITA	NLD	UK	Certifications
1980	The Glow of Love: Labels: RFC Records/Warner Records	29	10	22	—	—	US: Gold
1981	Miracles: Labels: RFC/Atlantic Records, WEA	46	9	—	—	—	
1982	Sharing Your Love: Labels: RFC/Atlantic, WEA	66	14	—	—	—	
1983	This Is Your Time: Labels: RFC/Atlantic, WEA	161	34	—	—	—	
1984	Change of Heart: Labels: RFC/Atlantic, WEA	102	15	—	24	34	
1985	Turn on Your Radio: Labels: Atlantic, Cooltempo Records	208	64	—	—	39	
2010	Change Your Mind: Labels: Fonte Records	—	—	—	—	—	
2018	Love 4 Love: Labels: ODC Records	—	—	—	—	—	
2025	Embrace: Labels: Fresca Records	—	—	—	—	—	
"—" denotes a recording that did not chart or was not released in that territory.

=== Singles ===
Year	Single	Peak chart positions									Album
Year	Single	US	US R&B	US Dance	BE	IRL	ITA	NLD	NZ	UK	Album
1980	"A Lover's Holiday"	40	5	1	—	—	—	15	24	14	The Glow of Love
1980	"The Glow of Love"	—	49	1	—	—	2	—	—	—	The Glow of Love
1980	"Searching"	—	23	1	—	22	—	—	—	11	The Glow of Love
1981	"Paradise"	80	7	1	—	—	47	—	—	—	Miracles
1981	"Hold Tight"	89	40	1	—	—	—	—	—	—	Miracles
1981	"Heaven of My Life"	—	—	1	—	—	—	—	—	—	Miracles
1981	"Stop for Love" (UK only)	—	—	—	—	—	—	—	—	—	Miracles
1982	"The Very Best in You"	84	16	30	—	—	—	—	—	—	Sharing Your Love
1982	"Oh What a Night"	—	—	—	—	—	—	—	—	—	Sharing Your Love
1982	"Hard Times (It's Gonna Be Alright)"	—	71	—	—	—	—	—	—	—	Sharing Your Love
1982	"Sharing Your Love"	—	—	—	—	—	—	—	—	—	Sharing Your Love
1982	"Keep on It" (Italy only)	—	—	—	—	—	—	—	—	—	Sharing Your Love
1983	"This Is Your Time"	—	33	39	—	—	—	—	—	—	This Is Your Time
1983	"Magical Night"	—	—	—	38	—	—	—	—	—	This Is Your Time
1983	"Don't Wait Another Night"	—	89	—	—	—	—	—	—	—	This Is Your Time
1983	"Got to Get Up"	—	—	—	—	—	—	—	—	—	This Is Your Time
1984	"Change of Heart"	—	7	17	21	14	—	17	—	17	Change of Heart
1984	"It Burns Me Up"	—	61	—	—	—	—	—	—	—	Change of Heart
1984	"You Are My Melody"	—	—	—	—	—	—	—	—	48	Change of Heart
1985	"Say You Love Me Again"	—	—	—	—	—	—	—	—	94	Change of Heart
1985	"Let's Go Together"	91	56	33	—	—	—	42	—	37	Turn on Your Radio
1985	"Examination" (Italy only)	—	—	—	—	—	—	—	—	—	Turn on Your Radio
1985	"Oh What a Feeling"	—	—	—	—	—	—	—	—	56	Turn on Your Radio
1985	"Mutual Attraction"	—	—	—	—	—	—	—	—	60	Turn on Your Radio
2018	"Hit or Miss"	—	—	—	—	—	—	—	—	—	Love 4 Love
2019	"Love 4 Love"	—	—	—	—	—	—	—	—	—	Love 4 Love
"—" denotes a recording that did not chart or was not released in that territory.

== See also ==
- List of number-one dance hits (United States)
- List of artists who reached number one on the US Dance chart
