= Jacques Fred Petrus =

French-Italian music executive (1948–1987)

Jacques Fred Petrus (French pronunciation: [ʒak fʁɛd pɛtrys]; February 22, 1948 – June 8, 1987) was a West Indian-born French businessman and a pioneer of post-disco music. He spent much of his career in Italy and the United States.

== Early life ==
Born in Guadeloupe in the French West Indies, Petrus worked as a diesel-engine mechanic on a cargo ship aged 15. He subsequently travelled to Paris following his interest for R&B and soul music, where he worked as a DJ at different clubs from 1968, including the jet-set nightclub Club Saint-Hilaire.

In the early 1970s, he moved to Milan, Italy, and continued DJing at various clubs including Good Mood. In Bologna he met music student Mauro Malavasi, who became his working partner and main songwriter and producer, and together they formed a disco production company called Goody Music Productions (GMP), established a recording studio in Bologna, and created the Goody Music Records label.

== Career ==
In 1978 Petrus and Malavasi launched their first studio project called Macho. There followed a series of releases under different names, including Elvin Shaad (1978), Peter Jacques band (1979), Revanche (1979), Rudy (an album featuring the Italian Goody Music collaborator Rudy Trevisi), Midnight Gang (1979), A.N.T.I. Rock (1980) (an Italian version of Ottawan's disco hit "D.I.S.C.O."), The Jumpers (1980), Gianni Riso (1980) and Caprice (1980). In 1979 Petrus gathered his international music activities under the company name Little Macho Music, opening an office in New York.

In 1980, Petrus and Malavasi established their signature sound under the name Change, a blend of eurodisco and American R&B-flavoured disco inspired by Chic, releasing their debut album The Glow of Love. Petrus used two other Italian musicians on this album, bassist Davide Romani and guitarist Paolo Gianolio. Romani wrote the number-one hits "A Lover's Holiday" and "The Glow of Love" (with vocals by Luther Vandross and Jocelyn Brown), and also arranged and conducted the entire set with Gianolio. "A Lover's Holiday" reached number one on Billboard's Hot Dance Club Play for nine weeks, and the album also received seven Grammy Award nominations.

After the success with Change, Petrus and Malavasi launched several new projects including The Brooklyn, Bronx and Queens band (B. B. & Q. band) in 1981, High Fashion (1982) (including the Romani/Malavasi composition "Feelin' lucky lately" which reached no.32 on Billboard's R&B chart), Silence (a pop album released in 1982) and Zinc (1982). Petrus and his group of Italian studio musicians and writers also co-wrote and produced parts of The Ritchie Family's 1982 album I'll do my Best. The title track, written by Malavasi, became a club hit. The B. B. & Q. band was the most successful Petrus project after Change. Their self-titled 1981 debut album included "On the Beat" (written by Malavasi and Slade), a dance track that reached no.8 on the Billboard black singles charts.

In the second half of the 1980s Petrus releases further albums by the B.B.& Q. Band (1985), Peter Jacques Band (1985) and Change (1985). Less successful projects in 1984 and 1985 (often single releases) included Silence 2 feat. Gordon Grody (1984), Macho III (1984), Kevin Johnson (1984), Zinc feat. Sherwin (1984), M Like Moon (1984), Midnight Gang (1984), Tato (1985), Nobel (1985) and Persuader (1985). Due to tax problems in the United States, Petrus was forced to shut down Little Macho Music. In 1985 he started a new production company and record label called Renaissance International. Vedette International was the name of his new publishing company.

== Death ==
In 1986 the United States Internal Revenue Service (IRS) accused Petrus of tax evasion. Petrus put his music industry activities on hold and fled first to Italy, then to Guadeloupe.

Petrus was murdered in the spring of 1987 in Guadeloupe at the age of 39. French police reported that Petrus had been shot at home in the heights of Saint-Félix by a Swiss gunman, who had clashed with him earlier that night at L'Elysée Matignon club in Le Gosier, which Petrus owned.

== Producer discography ==
- A.N.T.I. Rock: single "D.I.S.C.O.", Goody Music, 1980.
- B.B.& Q. Band, The: LP/CD The Brooklyn, Bronx & Queens Band, EMI-Capitol, 1981
  - Singles: "On the Beat", "Starlette", "Time for Love", "Mistakes".
- B.B.& Q. Band, The: LP/CD All Night Long, EMI-Capitol, 1982
  - Singles: "Imagination", "All Night Long (She’s Got the Moves I Like)".
- B.B.& Q. Band, The: LP/CD Six Million Times, EMI-Capitol, 1983
  - Singles: "Keep It Hot", "She's a Woman".
- B.B.& Q. Band, The: LP/CD Genie, Cooltempo/Break/Zyx/Mega, 1985
  - Singles: "Genie", "Dreamer", "On the Shelf", "Riccochet", "Minutes Away", "Main Attraction".
- B.B.& Q. Band, The: LP/CD The Best of B.B.& Q. Band, Italo Heat, 1988.
- B.B.& Q. Band, The: CD Final Collection, Fonte, 2008.
- B.B.& Q. Band, The: CD Greatest Hits & Essential Tracks, Fonte, 2009.
- Caprice: LP Russia, Goody Music, 1980.
  - Singles: "Russia", "Stay Tonight".
- Change: LP/CD The Glow of Love, Goody Music/RFC-Warner Bros., 1980
  - Singles: "A Lover's Holiday", "The Glow of Love", "Searching", "Angel in My Pocket".
- Change: LP/CD Miracles, Goody Music/RFC-Atlantic, 1981
  - Singles: "Paradise", "Hold Tight", "Miracles", "Stop for Love", "Heaven of My Life".
- Change: LP/CD Sharing Your Love, Memory/RFC-Atlantic, 1982
  - Singles: "The Very Best in You", "Hard Times (It's Gonna Be Alright)", "Oh What a Night", "Keep on It", "Sharing Your Love".
- Change: LP/CD This Is Your Time, Memory/RFC-Atlantic, 1983
  - Singles: "Got to Get Up", "This Is Your Time", "Don’t Wait Another Night", "Magical Night".
- Change: LP/CD Change of Heart, Five/RFC-Atlantic, 1984
  - Singles: "Change of Heart", "You Are My Melody", "Say You Love Me Again", "It Burns Me Up".
- Change: LP Greatest Hits, Renaissance International, 1985.
- Change: LP/CD Turn on Your Radio, Renaissance International/RFC-Atlantic, 1985
  - Singles: "Let’s Go Together", "Oh What a Feeling", "Mutual Attraction", "Examination", "Turn on Your Radio".
- Change: CD The Very Best of Change, Rhino-Atlantic, 1998.
- Change: 2CD The Best of Change, Warner Music, 2003.
- Change: 2CD The Final Collection, Fonte, 2007.
- Change: 2CD Greatest Hits & Essential Tracks, Fonte, 2009.
- Elvin Shaad: LP Live for Love, Goody Music, 1978
  - Single: "Live for Love".
- Goody Music Orchestra, The: LP Hits of the World Vol. 1 - Best of Goody, Goody Music, 1980.
- High Fashion: LP/CD Feelin' Lucky, EMI-Capitol, 1982
  - Singles: "Feelin' Lucky Lately", "You're the Winner", "Hold On".
- High Fashion: LP/CD Make Up Your Mind, EMI-Capitol, 1983
  - Single: "Break Up", "Make Up Your Mind".
- Gianni Riso: single "Disco Shy", Goody Music, 1980.
- Jumpers, The: single "Coke and Roll", Goody Music, 1980.
- Kevin Johnson: single "Video Night / Child of Tomorrow" Speed/Sneak Preview, 1984.
- M Like Moon: single "Sunlight", Flarenasch/Ariola, 1984 / Renaissance International, 1985.
- Macho: LP/CD I'm a Man, Goody Music/Prelude, 1978
  - Singles: "I’m a Man", "Hear Me Calling".
- Macho (II): LP/CD Roll, Goody Music, 1980
  - Singles: "Roll", "Mothers Love", "Not Tonight".
- Macho III: single “Kalimba De Luna”, Flarenasch/Five, 1984.
- Midnight Gang: LP Love Is Magic, Goody Music, 1979
  - Singles: "Love Is Magic", "Midnight Game".
- Midnight Gang: single "Holliwood City", Speed, 1984.
- Nobel: single "Turn on Your Radio", Renaissance International, 1985.
- Peter Jacques Band: LP/CD Fire Night Dance, Goody Music/Prelude, 1979
  - Singles: "Walking on Music", "Fire Night Dance", "Devil's Run", "Fly with the Wind".
- Peter Jacques Band: LP/CD Welcome Back, Goody Music, 1980
  - Singles: "Is It It", "Counting on Love (One-Two-Three)", "The Louder", "Mighty Fine".
- Peter Jacques Band: LP/CD Dancing in the Street, Renaissance International/Polydor, 1985
  - Singles: "Going Dancin' Down the Street", "Mexico", "Drive Me Crazy", "This Night".
- Peter Jacques Band: CD The Very Best of Peter Jacques Band, Fonte, 2006.
- Peter Jacques Band: CD Greatest Hits & Essential Tracks, Fonte, 2009.
- Persuader: single "So Decide", Renaissance International, 1985.
- Revanche: LP/CD Music Man, Goody Music/Atlantic, 1979
  - Singles: "Music Man", "Revenge", "You Get High in N.Y.C.", "1979 It's Dancing Time".
- Ritchie Family, The: LP/CD I'll Do My Best, RCA, 1982
  - Singles: "I'll Do My Best (For You Baby)", "Walk with Me", "Alright on the Night".
- Rudy: LP/CD Just Take My Body, Goody Music/Polydor, 1979
  - Singles: "White Room", "Just Take My Body", "Thank You Baby".
- Sherwin: single "State of the Nation", Speed, 1984.
- Silence: LP Goodtime Baby, Memory, 1982
  - Singles: "Midnight Visitors", "No Way".
- Silence 2: LP The Beast in Me, Flarenasch/Five, 1984
  - Single: "The Beast in Me".
- Tato: single "Crazy Boy", Renaissance International, 1985.
- Zinc: LP/CD Street Level, Memory/Jive, 1982
  - Singles: "Street Level", "Punkulation", "Amazon", "I'll Never Stop".
- Zinc: single "I’m Livin' a Life of Love", Jive, 1983.
- Zinc feat. Sherwin: single "Hollywood City", Sneak Preview, 1984.
- Zinc feat. Sherwin: single "State of the Nation", Sneak Preview, 1984.
