= Mauro Malavasi =

Italian pianist, arranger and producer (born 1957)

- Born: March 21, 1957 (age 68); Mirandola, Modena, Italy
- Occupations: Music producer; arranger
- Years active: 1979–present

Mauro Malavasi (born 21 March 1957) is an Italian pianist, songwriter and producer. After graduating from the Bologna Conservatory and performing in several jazz ensambles, in 1977 he started collaborating with Jacques Fred Petrus in various disco, Italodisco and dance projects, and went on to write and produce hits with various Italian musicians. He received a Pico Mirandola Award in his hometown in 2008. He created the R&B band Change, in the process discovering vocalists Luther Vandross and Jocelyn Brown, and had a million-selling single, "A Lover's Holiday". Starting from the 1984 album Viaggi organizzati, he became co-writer and producer of Italian superstar singer Lucio Dalla. In the following years he collaborated with numerous high-profile Italian artists, including Andrea Bocelli, Gianni Morandi, Gianna Nannini, Elisa, Luca Carboni, Mango, Biagio Antonacci, Tony Esposito, Gerardina Trovato, Ron. In 2023 he co-produced and co-arranged Luca Frigeri's album Connessione Spirituale.
