= List of number-one songs of 1981 (Mexico) =

This is a list of the songs that reached number one in Mexico in 1981, according to the Notitas Musicales magazine with data provided by Radio Mil (which also provided charts for Billboard's "Hits of the World" between 1969 and 1981).

Notitas Musicales was a bi-weekly magazine that published two record charts:

- "Canciones que México canta" ("Songs that Mexico sings"), which listed the Top 10 most popular Spanish-language songs in Mexico, and
- "Hit Parade", which was a Top 10 of the most popular songs in Mexico that were in languages other than Spanish.

== Chart history ==
Issue Date	Spanish-language songs		Songs in other languages		Ref.
Issue Date	Song	Artist(s)	Song	Artist(s)	Ref.
1 January	"Perdóname"	Camilo Sesto	"It's Still Rock and Roll to Me"	Billy Joel	
15 January	"Perdóname"	Camilo Sesto	"It's Still Rock and Roll to Me"	Billy Joel	
1 February	"Perdóname"	Camilo Sesto	"Can't Stop the Music"	Village People	
15 February	"Perdóname"	Camilo Sesto	"(Just Like) Starting Over"	John Lennon	
1 March	"Quiero dormir cansado"	Emmanuel	"(Just Like) Starting Over"	John Lennon	
15 March	"Quiero dormir cansado"	Emmanuel	"(Just Like) Starting Over"	John Lennon	
1 April	"Quiero dormir cansado"	Emmanuel	"(Just Like) Starting Over"	John Lennon	
15 April	"Don Diablo"	Miguel Bosé	"(Just Like) Starting Over"	John Lennon	
1 May	"La ladrona"	Diego Verdaguer	"The Tide Is High"	Blondie	
15 May	"La ladrona"	Diego Verdaguer	"The Tide Is High"	Blondie	
1 June	"La ladrona"	Diego Verdaguer	"The Tide Is High"	Blondie	
15 June	"La ladrona"	Diego Verdaguer	"Your Love"	Lime	
1 July	"Ella se llamaba"	Napoleón	"Your Love"	Lime	
15 July	"Ella se llamaba"	Napoleón	"Your Love"	Lime	
1 August	"Ella se llamaba"	Napoleón	"Your Love"	Lime	
15 August	"Ella se llamaba"	Napoleón	"Your Love"	Lime	
1 September	"Ella se llamaba"	Napoleón	"Your Love"	Lime	
15 September	"Él me mintió"	Amanda Miguel	"Bette Davis Eyes"	Kim Carnes	
1 October	"Te quiero tanto"	Iván	"Your Love"	Lime	
15 October	"Él me mintió"	Amanda Miguel	"Give Me a Break"	Vivien Vee	
1 November	"Él me mintió"	Amanda Miguel	"Bette Davis Eyes"	Kim Carnes	
15 November	"Fuego"	Menudo	"Queen of Hearts"	Juice Newton	
1 December	"Fuego"	Menudo	"Queen of Hearts"	Juice Newton	
15 December	"Amor, no me ignores"	Camilo Sesto	"New York, New York"	Frank Sinatra	

== See also ==
- 1981 in music
- 1980s in Latin music

== Sources ==
- Print editions of the Notitas Musicales magazine.
