= Your Love =

Your Love may refer to:

== Albums ==
- Your Love (Raymond Lam album), 2008
- Your Love (Wang Leehom album) or the title song, 2015
- Your Love, by Glen Washington, 2002
- Your Love, by Lime, or the title song (see below), 1981
- Your Love, by Marié Digby, 2011

== Songs ==
- "Your Love" (Brandon Heath song), 2010
- "Your Love" (David Guetta and Showtek song), 2018
- "Your Love" (Diddy – Dirty Money song), 2010
- "Your Love" (Graham Central Station song), 1975
- "Your Love" (Jamie Principle song), 1986
- "Your Love" (Jim Brickman song), 1997
- "Your Love" (Jisoo song), 2025
- "Your Love" (Lime song), 1981
- "Your Love" (Marilyn McCoo and Billy Davis Jr. song), 1977
- "Your Love" (Nicole Scherzinger song), 2014
- "Your Love" (Nicki Minaj song), 2010
- "Your Love" (The Outfield song), 1986
- "Your Love" (Tammy Wynette song), 1987
- "Your Love (Means Everything to Me)", by Charles Wright & the Watts 103rd Street Rhythm Band, 1971
- "Your Luv", by MBLAQ, 2011
- "Your Love", by Alamid, 1994
- "Your Love", by Azana, 2020
- "Your Love", by Boris Way, 2017
- "Your Love", by Culture Beat, 2008
- "Your Love", by Diana Ross from Forever Diana: Musical Memoirs, 1993
- "Your Love", by Inner City, 1996
- "Your Love", by Keane from Night Train, 2010
- "Your Love", by Kylie Minogue from Fever, 2001
- "Your Love", by Little Mix from Glory Days, 2016
- "Your Love", by Michael Bolton from Michael Bolotin, 1975
- "Your Love", by the Prodigy, a B-side of the single "Charly", 1991
- "Your Love", by Tiësto and DallasK, 2016
- "Your Love (9PM)", by ATB, Topic, and A7S, a remix of "9 PM (Till I Come)", 2021
- "Your Love (Déjà Vu)", by Glass Animals from Dreamland, 2020
