= Lindsey McAlister =

English theatre director

Lindsey McAlister OBE
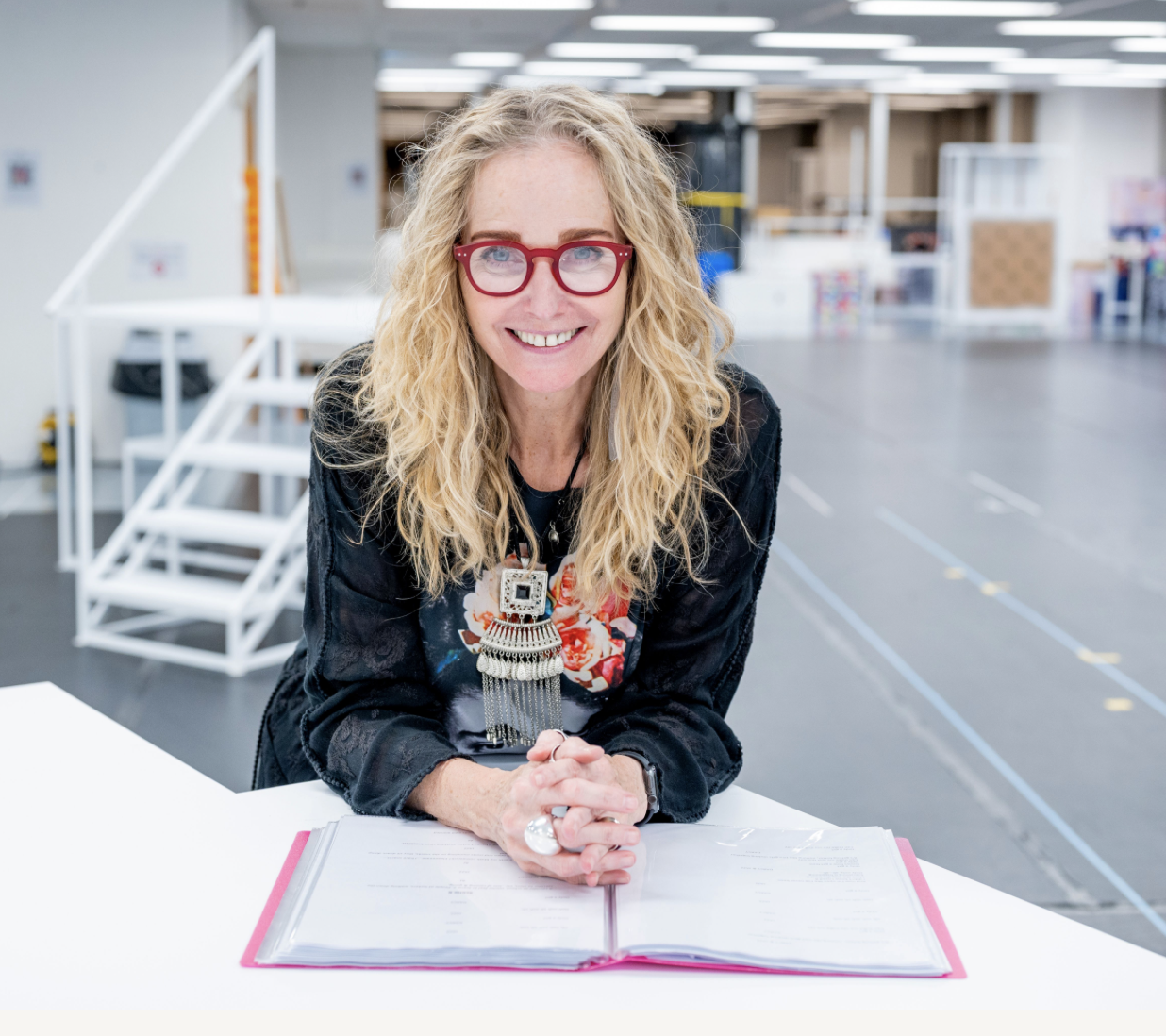
- Lindsey McAlister in 2021
- Born: Lindsey Anne McAlister; 30 October 1960 (age 66); Southport, England
- Occupation: Theatre director
- Known for: Founder of Hong Kong Youth Arts Foundation
- Spouses: Peter Inglis (m. 1990; div. 1999) Donald Greig (m. 2014)
- Children: 1
- Website: [www.hkyaf.com HKYAF]

Lindsey McAlister OBE (born 30 October 1960) is an English theatre director and writer based in Hong Kong. She founded the Hong Kong Youth Arts Foundation (HKYAF) (formerly Youth Arts Festival) in 1993. She has written several original musicals, including Flesh (2007), Melodia (2017), Cube Culture (2018), If Not Me, Who? (2019) and I'mperfect (2022). Since 2024 she began exhibiting abstract paintings, including the Hong Kong Affordable Art Fair.

== Early life and education ==
Lindsey Anne McAlister was born in Southport to parents George McAlister, a factory manager, and Sylvia née Cardwell, a civil servant. She has two younger brothers. The family moved to Scotland when she was eight, and then to Cheshire, where she attended Knutsford High School and Meol Cops High School. Watching a school production of Iolanthe at the age of nine and subsequently joining a youth theatre group “ignited [her] passion for theatre and the performing arts”. She attended Southport Art College from 1976 – 1978. The first year of her degree was at I.M. Marsh Campus (formerly part of Liverpool John Moores University), transferring to Crewe and Alsager College of Higher Education (now part of Manchester Metropolitan University) when the course folded. She graduated with a BA(Hons) in Creative Arts.

== Early work ==
McAlister originally wanted to be a performer but “early on, I realised I was rubbish and found that directing was my forte – to suit my bossy personality”. After graduating, McAlister formed a company, Talking Pictures, which was supported by the Arts Council of Great Britain. She also worked for the Gulbenkian Foundation, implementing the “Arts in Schools” project. She joined Liverpool-based company 489 as a creator and performer, then became arts programmer for the Menai Centre in Anglesey. She also worked with the Cheshire Dance Workshop from 1982 to 1985, where dance lecturer Veronica Lewis gave her opportunities to choreograph and create shows.

== Hong Kong ==
In 1986 McAlister arrived in Hong Kong at the end of a year-long trip around Southeast Asia. Her intention was to return to the UK to resume a job with the Arts Council. However, she felt strongly that she should stay in Hong Kong, so “I rang the UK and resigned!” She spent a year teaching English in a kindergarten, choreographing fashion shows and as an artist-in-residence for Quarry Bay Primary School.

She created a project Showcase for Choreographers with the Hong Kong Dance Forum which in 1990 developed into the Scrambled Legs youth dance company and the youth theatre company Roundabout. Around the same time, she also started Parkview Youth Theatre Company, Plastic Bag Theatre Company, Waterworks Youth Theatre Company and Fusion Performance Company.

== Hong Kong Youth Arts Foundation (HKYAF) ==
McAlister founded the Hong Kong Youth Arts Festival (HKYAF) in 1993 – it changed its name to Hong Kong Youth Arts Foundation in 2006 – for people aged 5–25, regardless of cultural background, language or ability, to engage in multidisciplinary arts. Her intention was that she “didn’t want anybody to have to pay for anything” so needed to find external funding to cover all expenses. Initially, unable to find a sponsor due to her lack of track record in Hong Kong, she took out a personal overdraft to cover the costs of the first two-week festival. She sent a copy of the festival brochure to everyone she had approached for sponsorship, including Po Chung, the then-head of DHL (Asia). He got in touch with her, asking who her sponsor was. Hearing that McAlister was funding the whole enterprise herself, Po Chung gave her a cheque to cover the 1993 festival's costs, and also paid for the next festival too. McAlister was HKYAF's primary fundraiser from 1993 to 2019, about which she said “I really enjoy seeking sponsorship and I have developed a talent for it.”

=== HKYAF Productions ===
McAlister has directed the following productions for HKYAF:

Year	Title	Venue	Role	Notes / Ref.
1998	Matilda	Shouson Theatre, Hong Kong Arts Centre	Adaptor, Director	
1998	Godspell	St John's Cathedral, Central	Director	
1999	Matilda	Venue 34 at Edinburgh Festival Fringe	Adaptor, Director	Music by Nick Harvey
1999	West Side Story	Shouson Theatre, Hong Kong Arts Centre	Director	
1999	The Magic Flute	Shouson Theatre, Hong Kong Arts Centre	Director	
2000	Grease	Shouson Theatre, Hong Kong Arts Centre	Director	
2001	Little Shop of Horrors	Shouson Theatre, Hong Kong Arts Centre	Director	
2001	The Secret Garden	Shouson Theatre, Hong Kong Arts Centre	Director	
2002	Bugsy Malone	Shouson Theatre, Hong Kong Arts Centre	Director	
2003	Blood Brothers	Shouson Theatre, Hong Kong Arts Centre	Director	
2003	The Wiz	Shouson Theatre, Hong Kong Arts Centre	Director	
2004	Footloose	Shouson Theatre, Hong Kong Arts Centre	Director	
2005	Fame	Shouson Theatre, Hong Kong Arts Centre	Director	
2006	Disco Infernal	Shouson Theatre, Hong Kong Arts Centre	Director	
2007	Insomnia	Fringe Club, Central	Director	
2008	Lear’s Daughters	Fringe Club, Central	Adaptor; Director	
2009	Sweeney Todd	Shouson Theatre, Hong Kong Arts Centre	Director	
2009	Storm in a Teacup	Fringe Club, Central	Director	
2010	Rent	Shouson Theatre, Hong Kong Arts Centre	Director	
2011	Spring Awakening	Shouson Theatre, Hong Kong Arts Centre	Director	
2011	The Story of a Girl	Fringe Club, Central	Director	
2012	Godspell	Shouson Theatre, Hong Kong Arts Centre	Director	
2013	A Chorus Line	Shouson Theatre, Hong Kong Arts Centre	Director	
2014	Oliver!	Shouson Theatre, Hong Kong Arts Centre	Director	
2015	The Evil Within	Chinese International School Auditorium	Director	
2015	Blood Brothers	Hong Kong Academy for Performing Arts Amphitheatre	Director	
2017	Melodia	Queen Elizabeth Stadium, Causeway Bay	Writer, Director	With music by Violaine Corradi and Rose Winebrenner
2018	Fame	Shouson Theatre, Hong Kong Arts Centre	Director	
2019	If Not Me, Who?	ArtisTree, Quarry Bay	Writer, Director	Part of Theatre Bites series. Music by Violaine Corradi
2020	#Hashtag	Shouson Theatre, Hong Kong Arts Centre	Writer, Director	
2021	Only a Girl	Shouson Theatre, Hong Kong Arts Centre	Writer, Director	
2022	I’mperfect	Shouson Theatre, Hong Kong Arts Centre	Writer, Director	
2023	24:7:365	The Box, West Kowloon Cultural District	Writer, Director	
2024	Gen Last	The Box, West Kowloon Cultural District	Writer, Director	
2025	Likes & Lies	The Box, West Kowloon Cultural District	Writer, Director	

== Lindsey McAlister Productions ==
In 1995 McAlister took a one-woman show Obsession is Not a Perfume to the Edinburgh Fringe Festival.

In 2002, alongside her youth work, McAlister established a production company for adults. Originally called Bloody Offal Productions, she changed its name to Lindsey McAlister Productions in 2005. It has produced the following shows to date:

Year	Title	Venue	Role	Notes / Ref.
2002	Sweeney Todd	Shouson Theatre, Hong Kong Arts Centre	Director; Producer	Produced under Bloody Offal Productions
2003	Blood Brothers	Shouson Theatre, Hong Kong Arts Centre	Director; Producer	Produced under Bloody Offal Productions
2004	Into the Woods	Shouson Theatre, Hong Kong Arts Centre	Director; Producer	Produced under Bloody Offal Productions
2005	A Chorus Line	Shouson Theatre, Hong Kong Arts Centre	Director; Producer	
2006	Godspell	Shouson Theatre, Hong Kong Arts Centre	Director; Producer	
2007; 2008	Flesh	Shouson Theatre, Hong Kong Arts Centre	Writer; Director; Producer	Music by Nick Harvey
2018	Cube Culture	ArtisTree, Quarry Bay	Writer; Director	Music by Nick Harvey
2023	Mou Man Tai	ArtisTree, Quarry Bay	Writer; Director	For Swire Properties' Project After 6 (PA6)

=== Collaborations ===
McAlister has collaborated with Violaine Corradi (composer musician, Cirque du Soleil), Nick Harvey (composer), Marsha Roddy (set and costume designer), Rose Winebrenner (composer musician, Cirque du Soleil) and Brian Zellinger (Tony Award-winning producer).

== Original productions ==
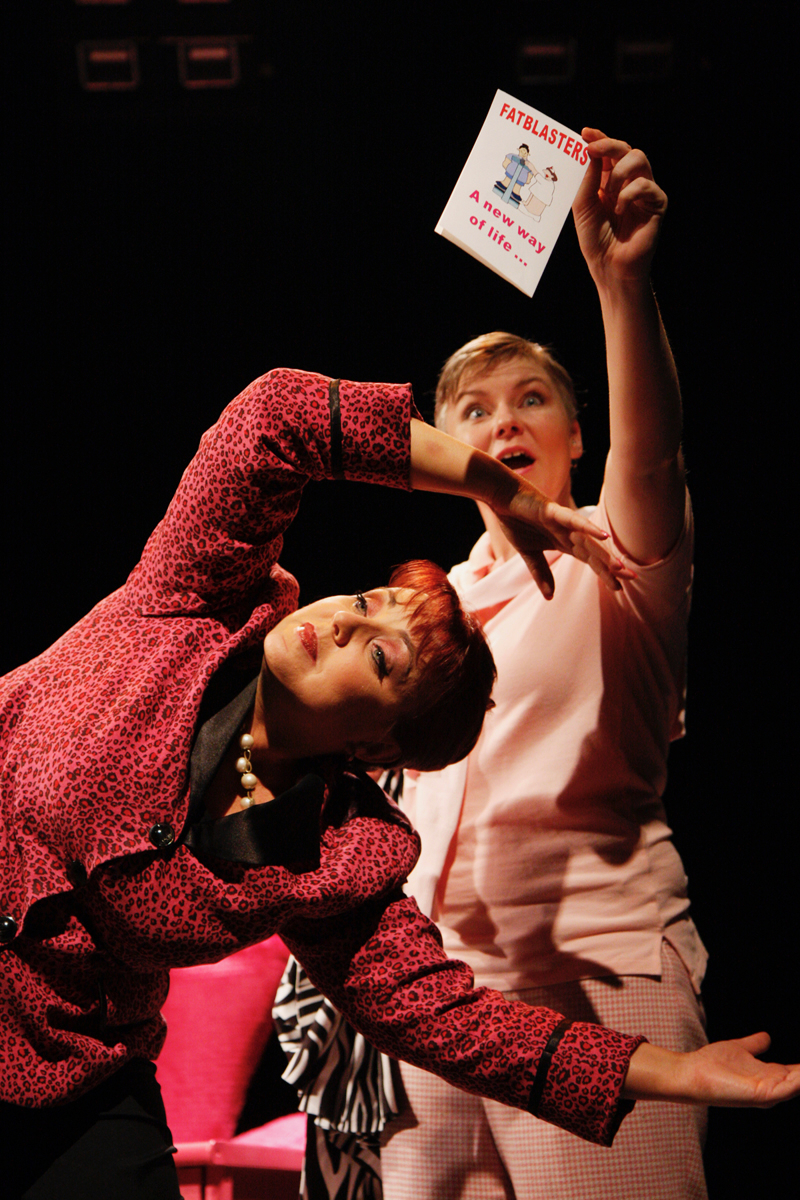
Flesh: The Musical (2008)

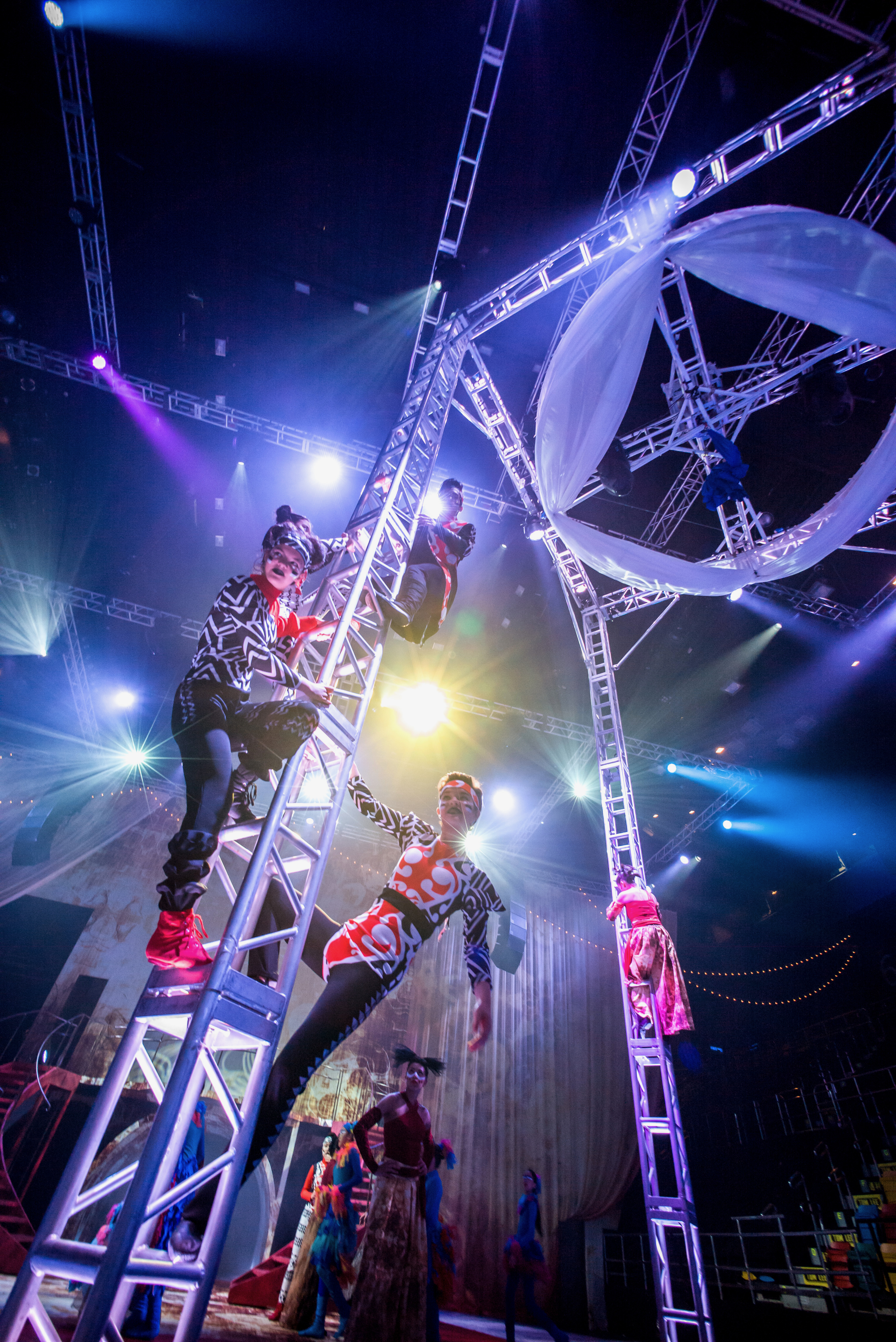
Melodia (2017)

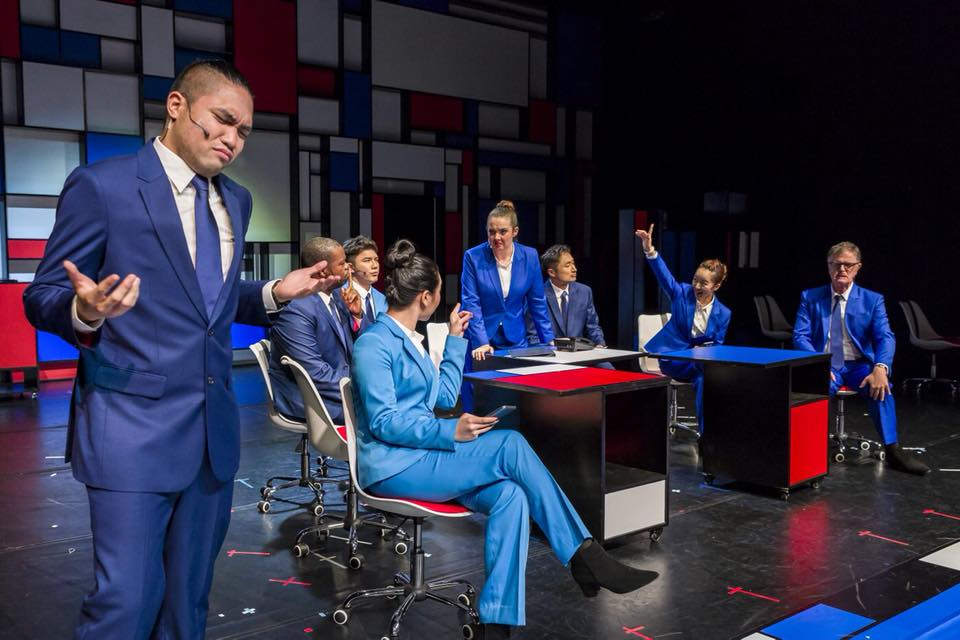
Cube Culture (2018)

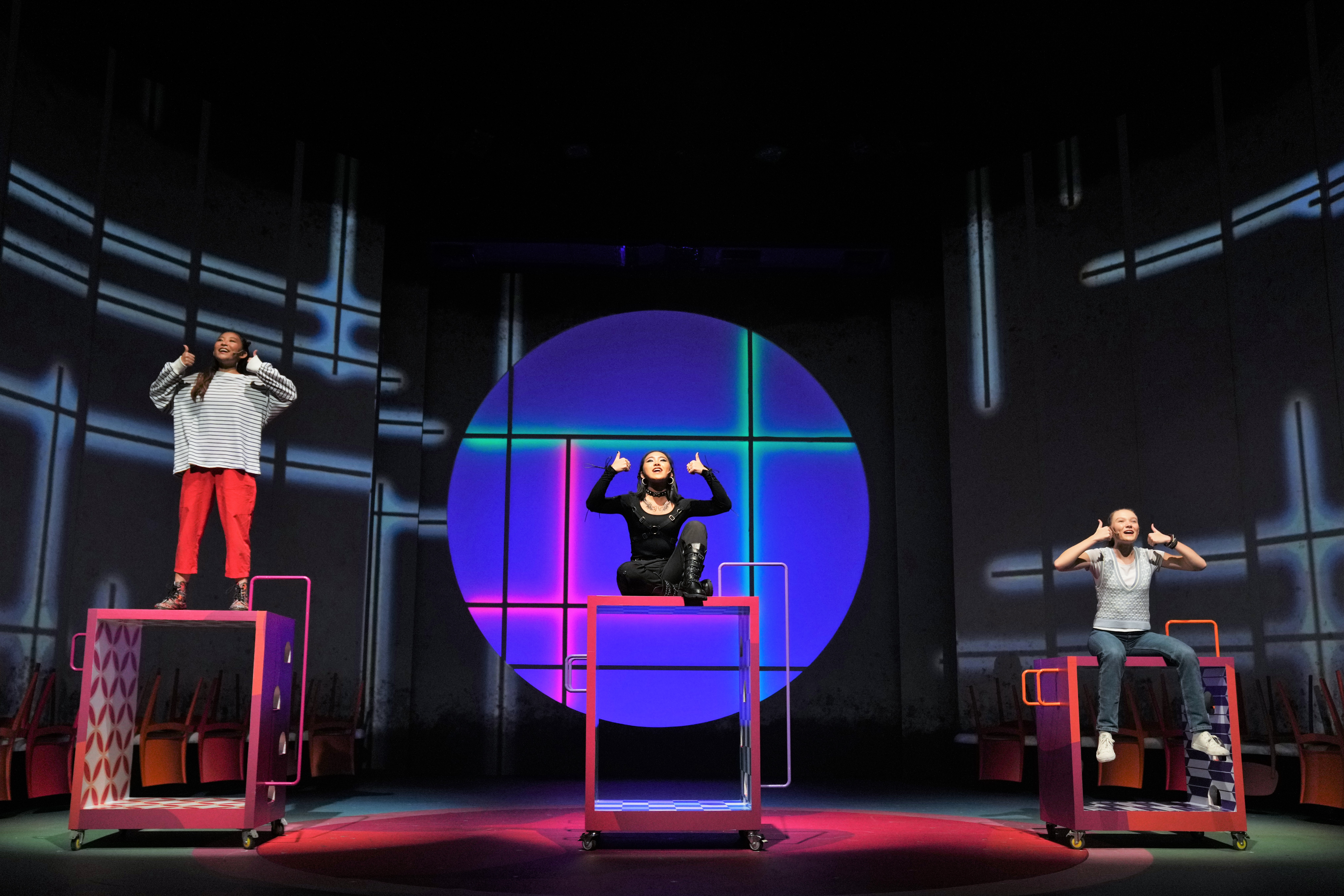
I'mperfect (2019)

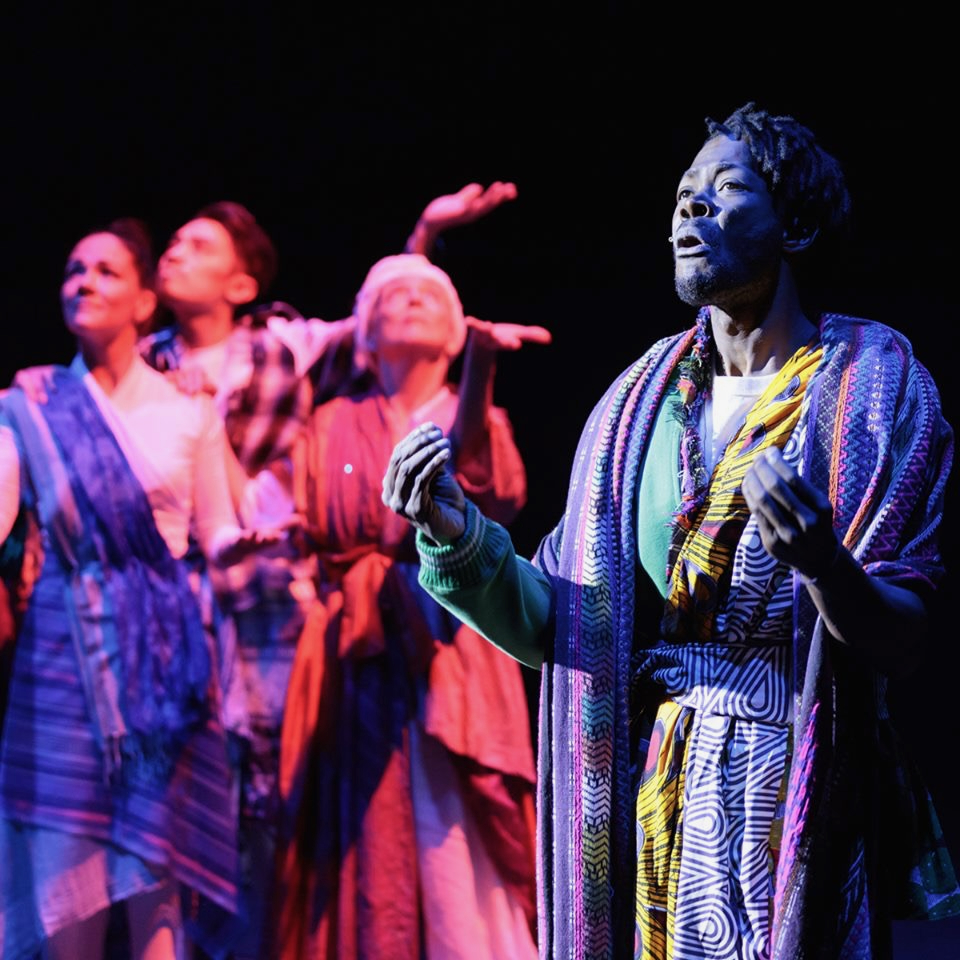
If Not Me, Who? (2019)

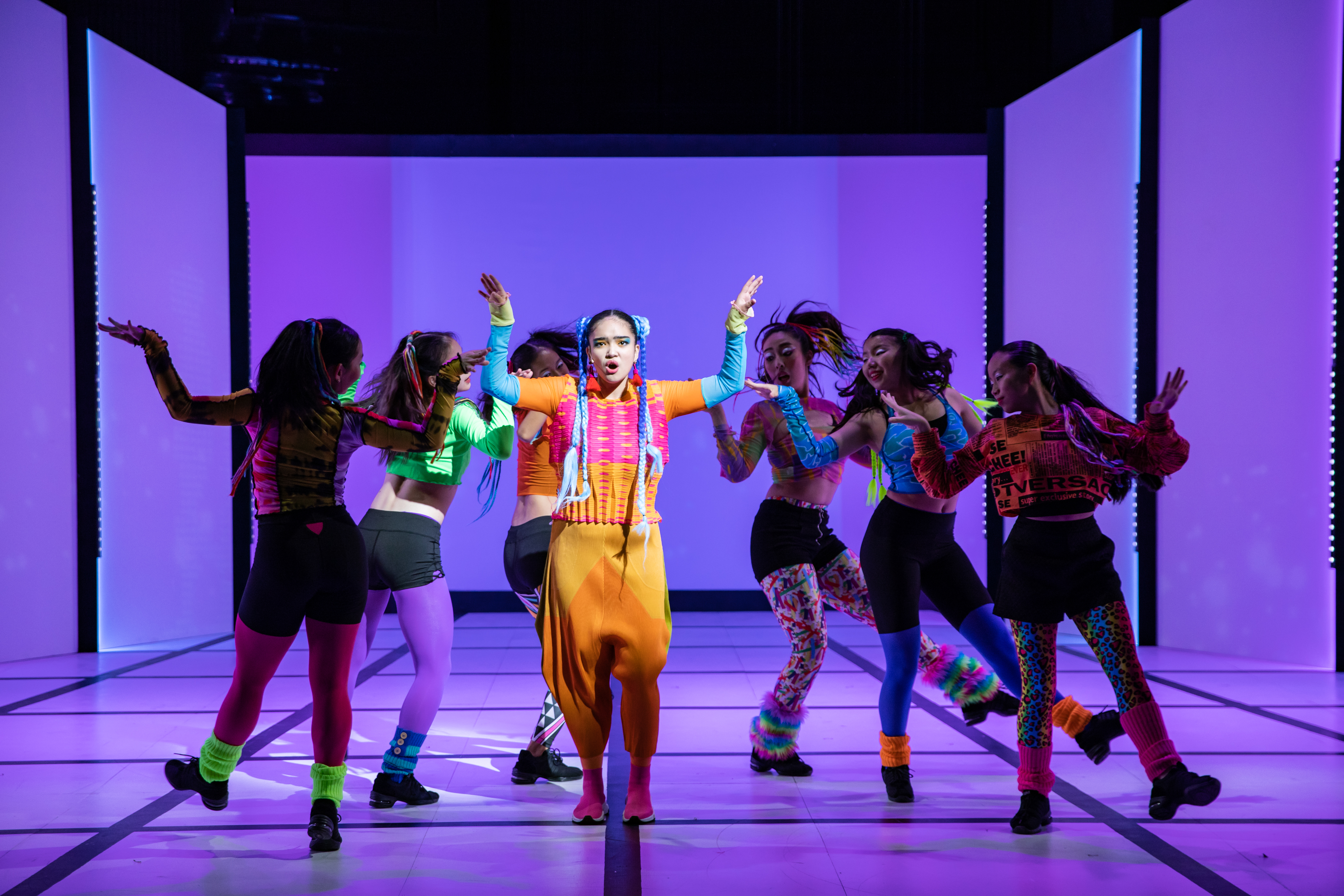
#Hashtag (2020)

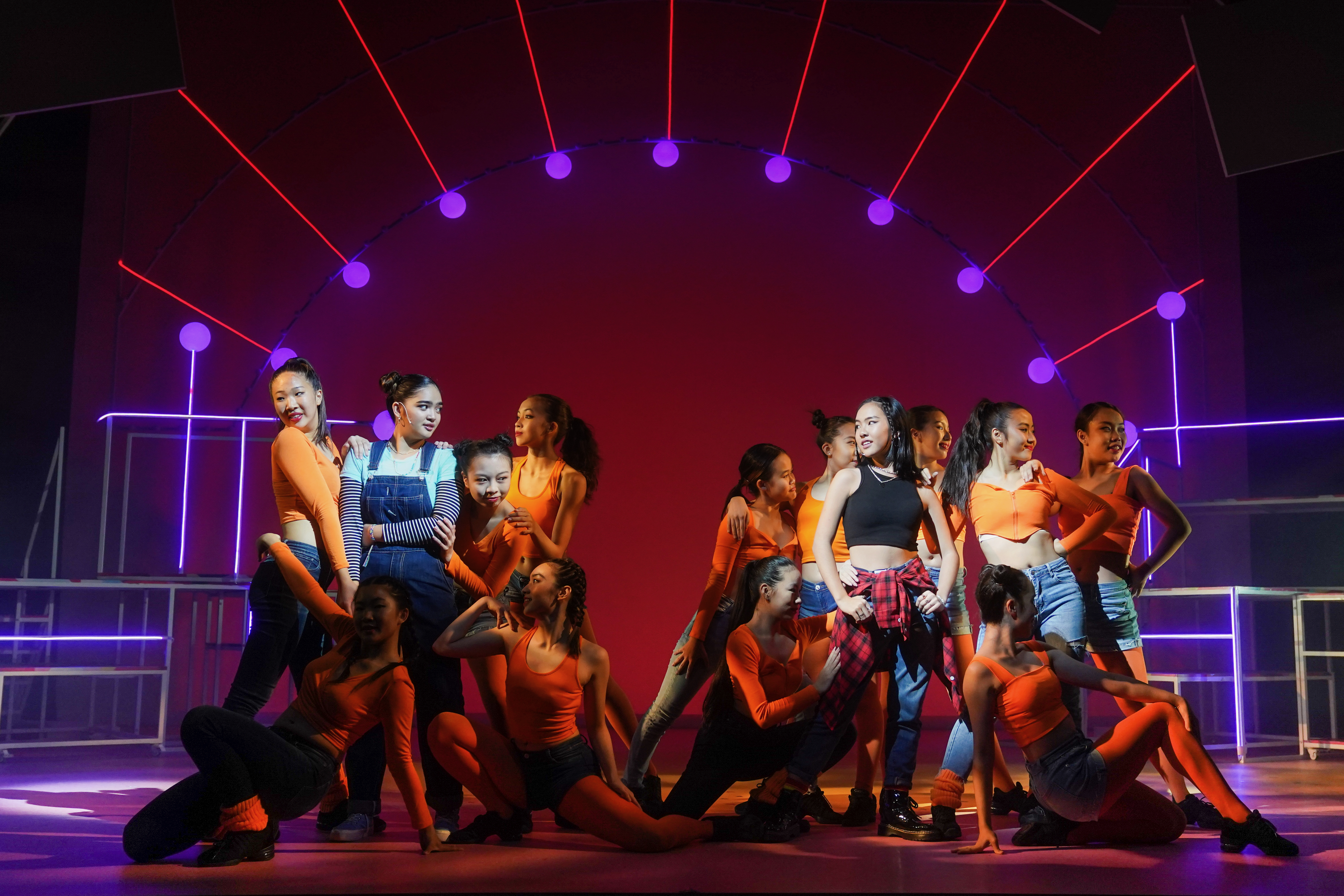
Only a Girl (2021)

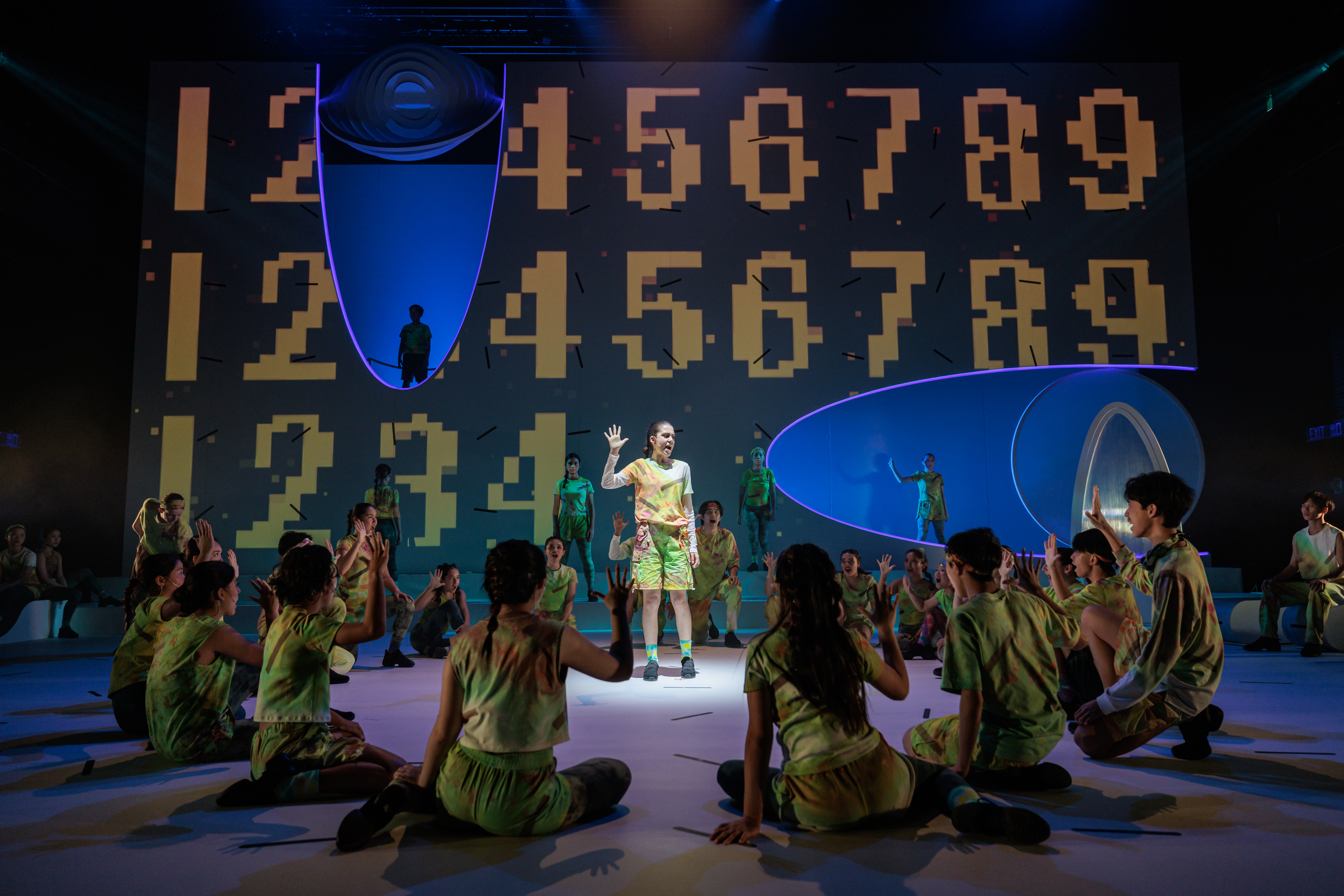
24:7:365 (2023)

== Visual arts ==
After a 40-year hiatus, McAlister returned to her visual art practice in 2022, creating a collection of Hong Kong-inspired artworks of “mix-n-match collages”. She has since exhibited paintings at Hong Kong's 2024 Affordable Art Fair, represented by Kambal Gallery.

== Honours and awards ==
- 1997 – MBE for youth arts work
- 2006 – OBE for commitment & contribution to UK arts overseas
- 2007 – Honorary Fellowship, University of Central Lancashire
- 2019 – A portrait of McAlister I Am Hera was one of 10 included in Kate Sparrow's exhibition I Am Woman at the Fringe Club
- 2021 – Named as Tatler Asia's Most Influential
- 2023 – Distinguished Achievement Award, Hong Kong Dance Alliance
- 2023 – Joined Tatler Asia's Front & Female Award voting committee
