= Morales and Munzibai =

Morales and Munzibai (a.k.a. "M and M") were a professional remix and dance record editing duo composed of John Morales (born 1954, The Bronx, New York) and Sergio Munzibai.

== Biography ==
The duo, both as individuals and as a team, produced a vast number of dance-oriented releases, distinguishing themselves by including Latin percussion in many of their efforts, utilising their mutual heritage to stand out in an era when many were jumping on the bandwagon and joining their profession. One of their most high-profile collaborations was with the Canadian duo Lime. The duo's remix of Lime's "Angel Eyes" was a visible highpoint in the evolution of house music in the mid 1980s, and they remixed and edited Lime's material for an entire greatest hits disc.

John Morales had helped to pioneer the use of editing for dancefloor remixes of records (prior to remixing 'proper', which he also helped to shape in technique). Morales had risked the ire of legendary disco diva Jocelyn Brown by deliberately using a vocal line that she had requested he leave out of the final mix of a recording of hers. He included it because it "felt right". When the record was a hit, she feigned disapproval but expressed joy at her success, and the two began a lasting friendship. Morales would be involved in many of her subsequent releases throughout the 1980s.

Munzibai is described by Morales as being a very social person who made it much easier for him, shyer than his partner, to focus on the music while Munzibai handled the ubiquitous politics of artist, manager, label, and promotional relationships.

Munzibai died in 1991.

John Morales took a few years away from the music business. In 2006, he launched a website dedicated to his work, past and present. The site announced that he had remixed the Love Man sessions by Marvin Gaye for the deluxe re-issue of Gaye's In Our Lifetime, his last album for Motown records before moving to CBS Records.

== Selected remixing credits ==
- 5th Dimension, The – "Surrender" (1983)
- Fatback Band - "Is This The Future?" (1983)
- Felder, Wilton – "Gentle Fire" (1983)
- Houston, Thelma – "Just Like All The Rest" (1984)
- Joseph, Margie – "Knockout" (1982)
- King, Evelyn – "Shake Down" (1983)
- Lime - "Angel Eyes" (1985)
- Moore, Melba - "Underlove" (1982)
- Pure Energy (group) - "Love Game" (1984)
- Temptations, The – "My Love Is True (Truly For You)" (1984)
- Thomas, Evelyn - "Heartless" (1984)
- Shakatak – "Down on the Street" (1984)
