= Hong Kong Youth Arts Foundation =

Hong Kong arts organisation

- Abbreviation: HKYAF
- Nickname: ‘YAF’
- Formation: 1993
- Founder: Lindsey McAlister OBE
- Founded at: Hong Kong
- Type: Non-profit
- Headquarters: Quarry Bay, Hong Kong
- Key people: Wendy Tsang, Director
- Website: https://www.hkyaf.com/

Hong Kong Youth Arts Foundation (HKYAF) was established by Lindsey McAlister OBE, in 1993. It serves people in Hong Kong aged 5 to 25 years. It is one of the largest youth art organisations in the world.

== History ==
In 1993 Lindsey McAlister founded the Hong Kong Youth Arts Festival for people aged 5–25 to engage in multidisciplinary arts, regardless of their cultural background, language or ability. Her intention was that she “didn't want anybody to have to pay for anything”, so needed to find external funding to cover all expenses. Initially, unable to find a sponsor as she had no track record in Hong Kong, she took out a personal overdraft to cover the costs of the first two-week festival. McAlister sent a copy of the festival brochure to everyone she had approached for sponsorship, including Po Chung, the then-head of DHL (Asia). He got in touch with her, asking who her sponsor was. Hearing that McAlister was funding the whole enterprise herself, Po Chung gave her a cheque to cover the first festival's costs, and also paid for the following festival too.

After Chung's donation, “word about the festival was spreading like wildfire” and other sponsors joined including Morgan Stanley, MTR Corporation, ABN Amro, Standard Chartered Hong Kong and Swire Properties. The first two-week festival took place in 1994.

HKYAF was located at the Hong Kong Arts Centre from 1995 until 2005 when it moved to its current location in Quarry Bay. With the move, their facilities grew to include on-site rehearsal and workshop spaces. In 2006 HKYAF was considered “the world's largest arts programme for young people”, at which point 94% of participants were from 800 local schools, with most projects conducted in Cantonese.

=== Funding and support ===
HKYAF is supported by corporate and private funding; it receives no direct funding from the government. The first two festivals were supported by Business for Art, which twinned the “commercial world with arts events.” In 1995 Standard Chartered Hong Kong joined as the main sponsor. Long-term supporters of the foundation also include Hong Kong Jockey Club Charity Trust, the Kadoorie Charitable Foundation and Swire Properties. Early patrons were David Tang, Lavender Patten and Rita McAulay.

=== International events ===
Early in its existence HKYAF took three productions to the Edinburgh Festival Fringe:

- Curiouser and Curiouser and Ssshhh…! (1997)
- Who's Afraid of Monsters? (1998)
- Matilda (1999)

=== Social awareness ===
Over the course of its history HKYAF has run projects and events based on a variety of social and environmental issues, including:

- BEA's Beyond Environmental Arts Festival
- #BeTheChange, a dance and spoken word film series that tackled social issues including climate change, the need for food banks and plastic pollution
- Eco-art installation at The Loop, Taikoo Place
- Theatre productions dealing with issues regarding mental health, body image, gender identity and social media

== Flagship events ==
Each year HKYAF runs approximately 100 events for visual, performing and literary arts. Its two annual flagship events are a large-scale youth theatre production and Arts in the Park (formerly Arts in the Plaza), a two-day community arts event.

=== Theatre productions ===
Since 1998 HKYAF has produced an annual youth musical or drama, directed by McAlister. Locations for performances have included Hong Kong Arts Centre's Shouson Theatre, the Queen Elizabeth Stadium, the Hong Kong Academy for Performing Arts, ArtisTree, the Fringe Club and Free Space, West Kowloon Cultural District.

Year	Title	Venue	Notes
1998	Matilda	Shouson Theatre, Hong Kong Arts Centre	Created by McAlister. Music by Nick Harvey. McAlister secured the rights to Dahls's work through David Tang's friendship with the Dahl family.
1998	Godspell	St John's Cathedral, Central	Adapted by McAlister
1998	Matilda	Venue 34 at Edinburgh Festival Fringe	
1998	West Side Story	Shouson Theatre, Hong Kong Arts Centre	
1998	The Magic Flute	Shouson Theatre, Hong Kong Arts Centre	
2000	Grease	Shouson Theatre, Hong Kong Arts Centre	
2001	Little Shop of Horrors	Shouson Theatre, Hong Kong Arts Centre	
2001	The Secret Garden	Shouson Theatre, Hong Kong Arts Centre	
2002	Bugsy Malone	Shouson Theatre, Hong Kong Arts Centre	
2003	Blood Brothers	Shouson Theatre, Hong Kong Arts Centre	
2003	The Wiz	Shouson Theatre, Hong Kong Arts Centre	
2004	Footloose	Shouson Theatre, Hong Kong Arts Centre	
2005	Fame	Shouson Theatre, Hong Kong Arts Centre	
2006	Disco Inferno	Shouson Theatre, Hong Kong Arts Centre	
2007	Insomnia	Fringe Club, Central	
2008	Lear's Daughters	Fringe Club, Central	
2009	Sweeney Todd: The Demon Barber of Fleet Street	Shouson Theatre, Hong Kong Arts Centre	
2009	Storm in a Teacup	Fringe Club, Central	
2010	Rent	Shouson Theatre, Hong Kong Arts Centre	
2011	Spring Awakening	Shouson Theatre, Hong Kong Arts Centre	
2011	The Story of a Girl	Fringe Club, Central	
2012	Godspell	Shouson Theatre, Hong Kong Arts Centre	
2013	A Chorus Line	Shouson Theatre, Hong Kong Arts Centre	
2014	Oliver!	Shouson Theatre, Hong Kong Arts Centre	
2015	The Evil Within	CIS Auditorium	
2015	Blood Brothers	APA Amphitheatre	
2016	Rent	Shouson Theatre, Hong Kong Arts Centre	
2017	Melodia	Queen Elizabeth Stadium	Written by McAlister. Music by Violaine Corradi and Rose Winebrenner
2017	PROJECT AFTER 6: Cube Culture	ArtisTree, Taikoo Place	Written by McAlister. Music by Nick Harvey
2018	Fame	Shouson Theatre	
2019	If Not Me, Who?	ArtisTree, Taikoo Place	Written by McAlister. Part of Theatre Bites series. Music by Violaine Corradi
2020	#Hashtag	Shouson Theatre, Hong Kong Arts Centre	Written by McAlister
2021	Only a Girl	Shouson Theatre, Hong Kong Arts Centre	Written by McAlister
2022	I’mperfect	Shouson Theatre, Hong Kong Arts Centre	Written by McAlister
2023	24:7:365	The Box, West Kowloon Cultural District	Written by McAlister
2023	PROJECT AFTER 6: You Man Tai	ArtisTree, Taikoo Place	Written by McAlister. Music by Nick Harvey
2024	Gen Last	The Box, West Kowloon Cultural District	Written by McAlister. Music by Amuer Calderon

HKYAF's annual Pull Back the Curtain series, showcasing local playwrights and actors, began in 2014. It was started by local director Clare Stearns and was inspired by London's National Theatre's course for young playwrights.

=== Standard Chartered Arts in the Park (AIP) ===
HKYAF produces the Standard Chartered Arts in the Park (AIP) annually. It is Hong Kong's largest outdoor youth festival. It began as a “small event in Southorn Playground in Wan Chai” in 1993 and 1994. It was developed into Arts in the Plaza and has been held on Hong Kong island (except during the pandemic) every winter since 2001. The first location was Stanley Plaza with “only hundreds” of participants. In 2008 it changed its name to Standard Chartered Arts in the Park, returned to Victoria Park, Causeway Bay and became a two-day event.

Year	Name	Location	Date/s	Theme
1995	Arts in the Park	Victoria Park, Causeway Bay	November 1995	
1998	Arts in the Park	Victoria Park, Causeway Bay	1 November 1998	With the Standard Chartered Wiggly Squiggly Circus
2001	Arts in the Plaza	Village Square, Stanley Plaza		
2002	Arts in the Plaza	Village Square, Stanley Plaza	3 November 2002	
2003	Arts in the Plaza	Village Square, Stanley	2 November 2003	
2004	Arts in the Plaza	Village Square, Stanley Plaza	31 October 2004	
2005	Arts in the Plaza	Village Square, Stanley Plaza	30 October 2005	
2006	Arts in the Plaza	Village Square, Stanley Plaza	5 November 2006	
2007	Arts in the Plaza Carnival	Village Square, Stanley Plaza	28 October 2007	The event also raised awareness of HIV/AIDS
2008	Standard Chartered Arts in the Park Mardi Gras	Victoria Park, Causeway Bay	8 November 2008	Including a Gulliver's Travels themed parade with over 500 performers
2009	Standard Chartered Arts in the Park Mardi Gras	Victoria Park, Causeway Bay	14 and 15 November 2009	
2010	Standard Chartered Arts in the Park Mardi Gras	Victoria Park, Causeway Bay	14 and 15 November 2010	Inspired by the elements: fire, earth, air, water and metal
2011	Standard Chartered Arts in the Park Mardi Gras	Victoria Park, Causeway Bay	12 and 13 November 2011	Inspired by Alice's Adventures in Wonderland
2012	Standard Chartered Arts in the Park Mardi Gras	Victoria Park, Causeway Bay	17 and 18 November 2012	Theme: Circus – A Feast for the Senses
2013	Standard Chartered Arts in the Park Mardi Gras	Victoria Park, Causeway Bay	16 and 17 November 2013	Theme: Gallery in Motion
2014	Standard Chartered Arts in the Park Mardi Gras	Victoria Park, Causeway Bay	14 and 15 November 2014	The theme was Defying Gravity
2015	Standard Chartered Arts in the Park Mardi Gras	Victoria Park, Causeway Bay	14 and 15 November 2015	A classical music theme including Rimsky-Korsakov's Scheherazade and Stravinsky's The Soldier's Tale
2016	Standard Chartered Arts in the Park Mardi Gras	Victoria Park, Causeway Bay	12 and 13 November 2016	Inspired by the work of William Shakespeare
2017	Standard Chartered Arts in the Park	Victoria Park, Causeway Bay		Inspired by the world of Roald Dahl
2018	Standard Chartered Arts in the Park	Victoria Park, Causeway Bay	3 and 4 November 2018	Inspired by the Land of Oz. Featuring a night parade for the first time
2019	CANCELLED			
2020	Standard Chartered Arts in the Park	Online	2 – 8 November 2020	10,000 art packs were distributed for online art activities
2021	Standard Chartered Arts in the Park	West Kowloon Cultural District	6 and 7 November 2021	Inspired by Peter Pan. Included a 5-day online programme
2022	Standard Chartered Arts in the Park	West Kowloon Cultural District Art Park	3 and 4 December 2022	Inspired by a Dickensian Christmas
2023	Standard Chartered Arts in the Park	Victoria Park, Causeway Bay	2 and 3 December 2023	Inspired by Saint-Saën's The Carnival of the Animals

== Notable visual projects ==
HKYAF has created many visual art events including:

Year	Project	Location
1996	One thousand nine hundred and ninety-nine postcards	Gallery 7, Central, Adelaide Festival
1998	Starry, Starry Night	Hong Kong Arts Centre
2001, 2002	World of Words	Pao Galleries, Hong Kong Arts Centre
2004	Jockey Club Pop Art Made in Hong Kong	City Plaza, Festival Walk, Hong Kong Arts Centre, Pacific Place
2012	Aedas Secret Spaces	Shek Kip Mei
2014 - 2016	Ocean Art Walk	Stanley Plaza
2017 onwards	Hong Kong Urban Canvas – shop shutter art	Various
2019	East Rail Line – Fun Fun Art	
2019	Draw HK	PMQ, Central
2020-2023	Jockey Club Project Silver Intergeneration Arts Project	Various

== Select performances and exhibitions ==
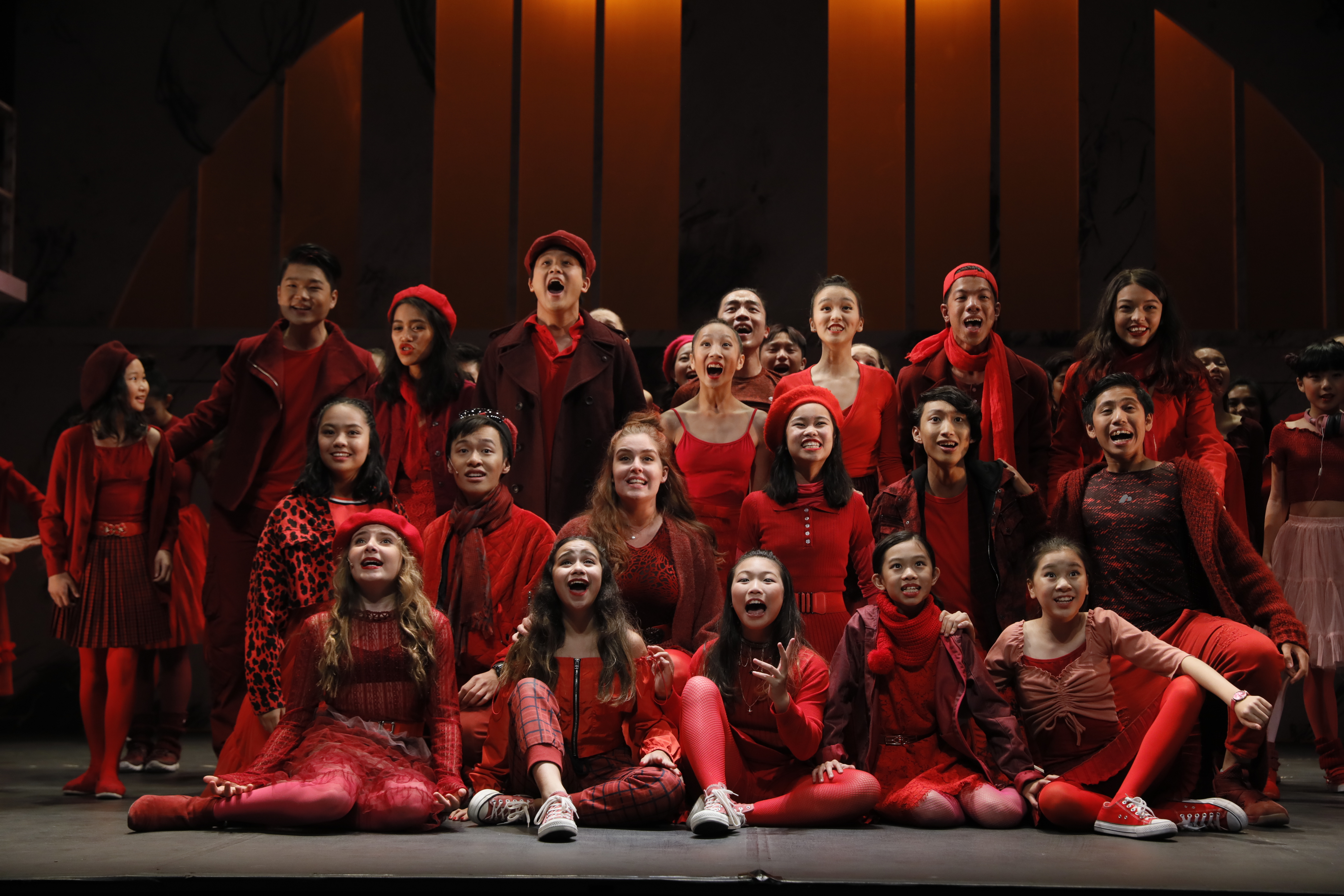
Fame (2019)

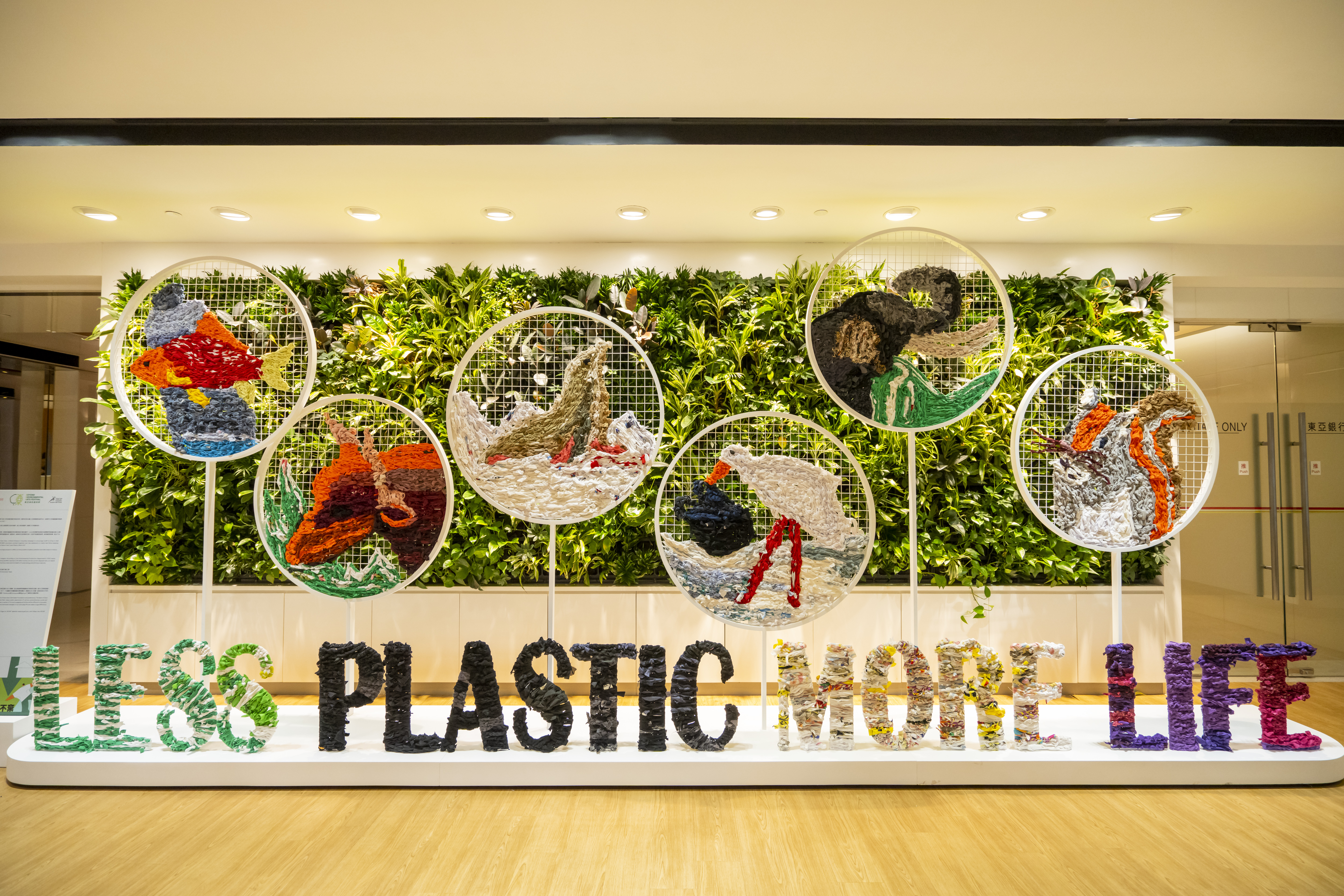
BEA Beyond Environmental Arts Festival (2022)

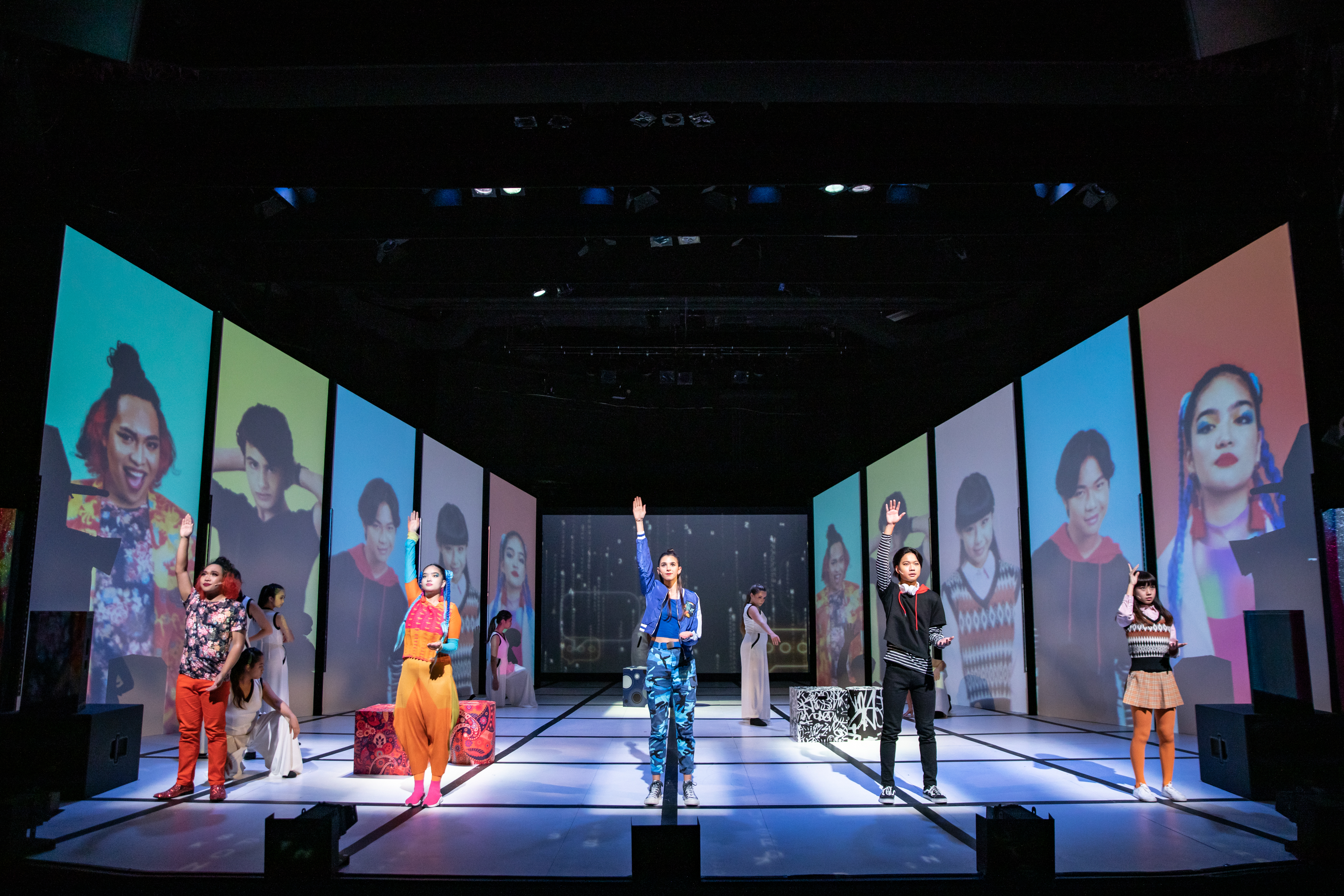
Hashtag (2020)

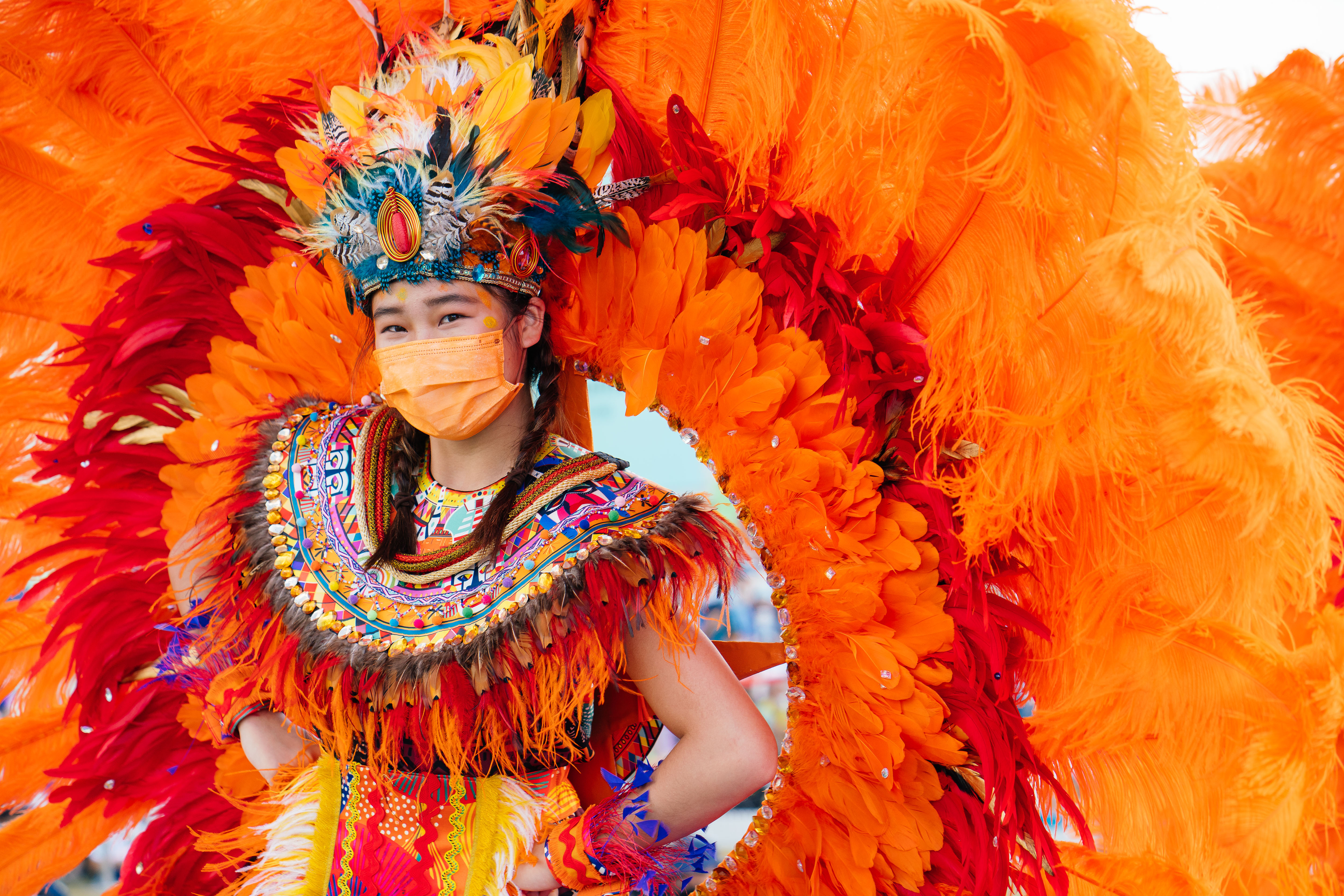
Standard Chartered Arts in the Park

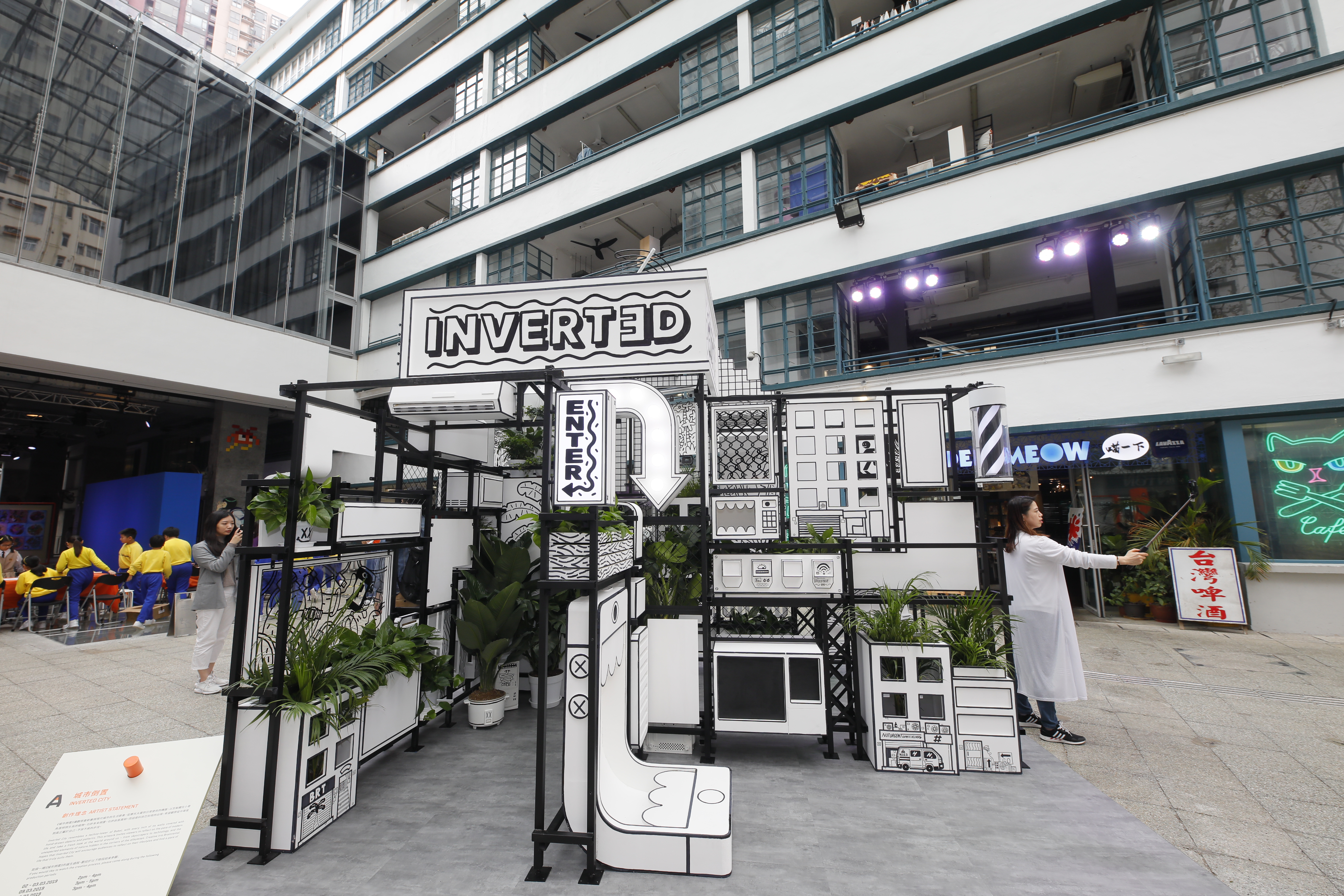
Draw HK (2019)

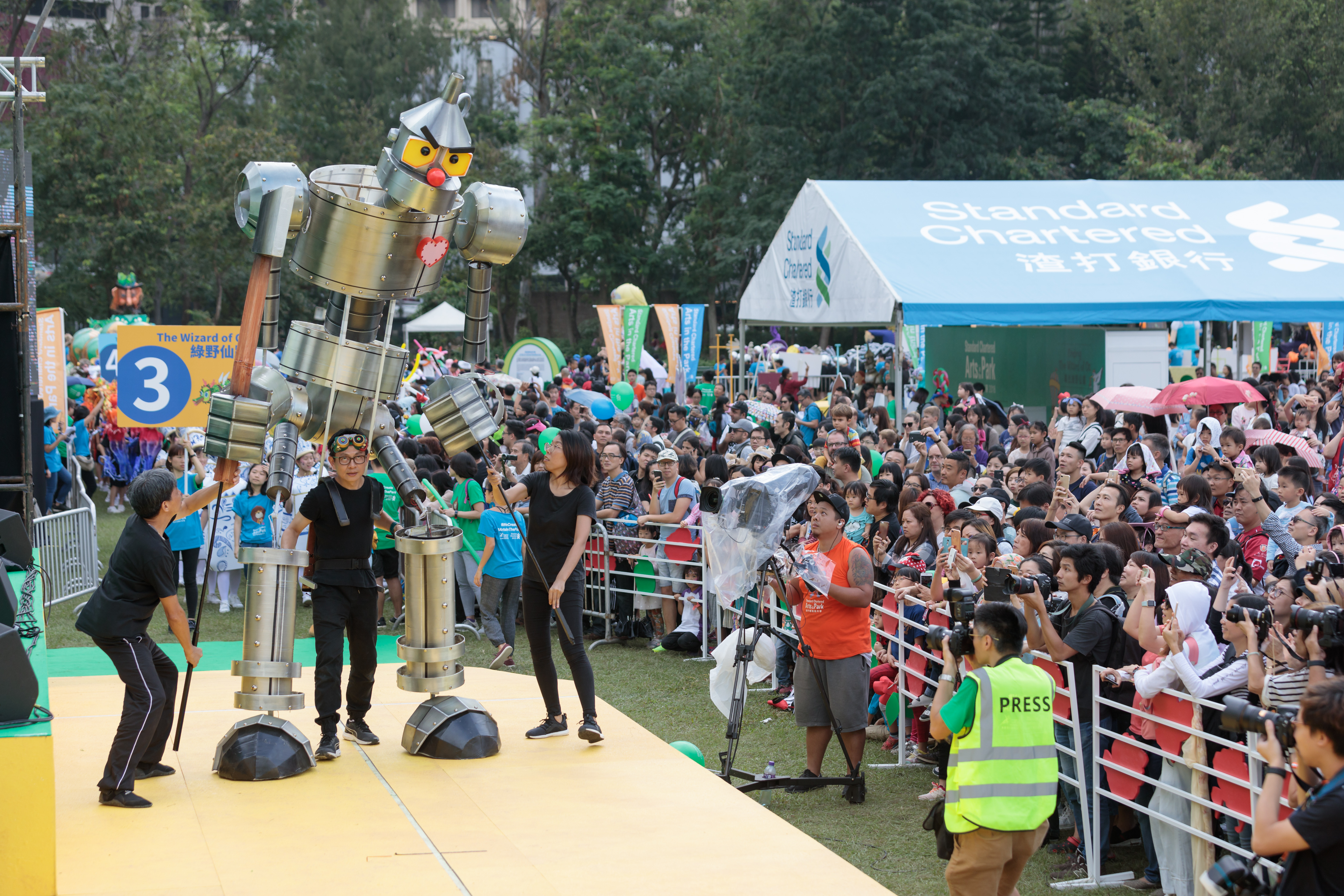
Standard Chartered Arts in the Park

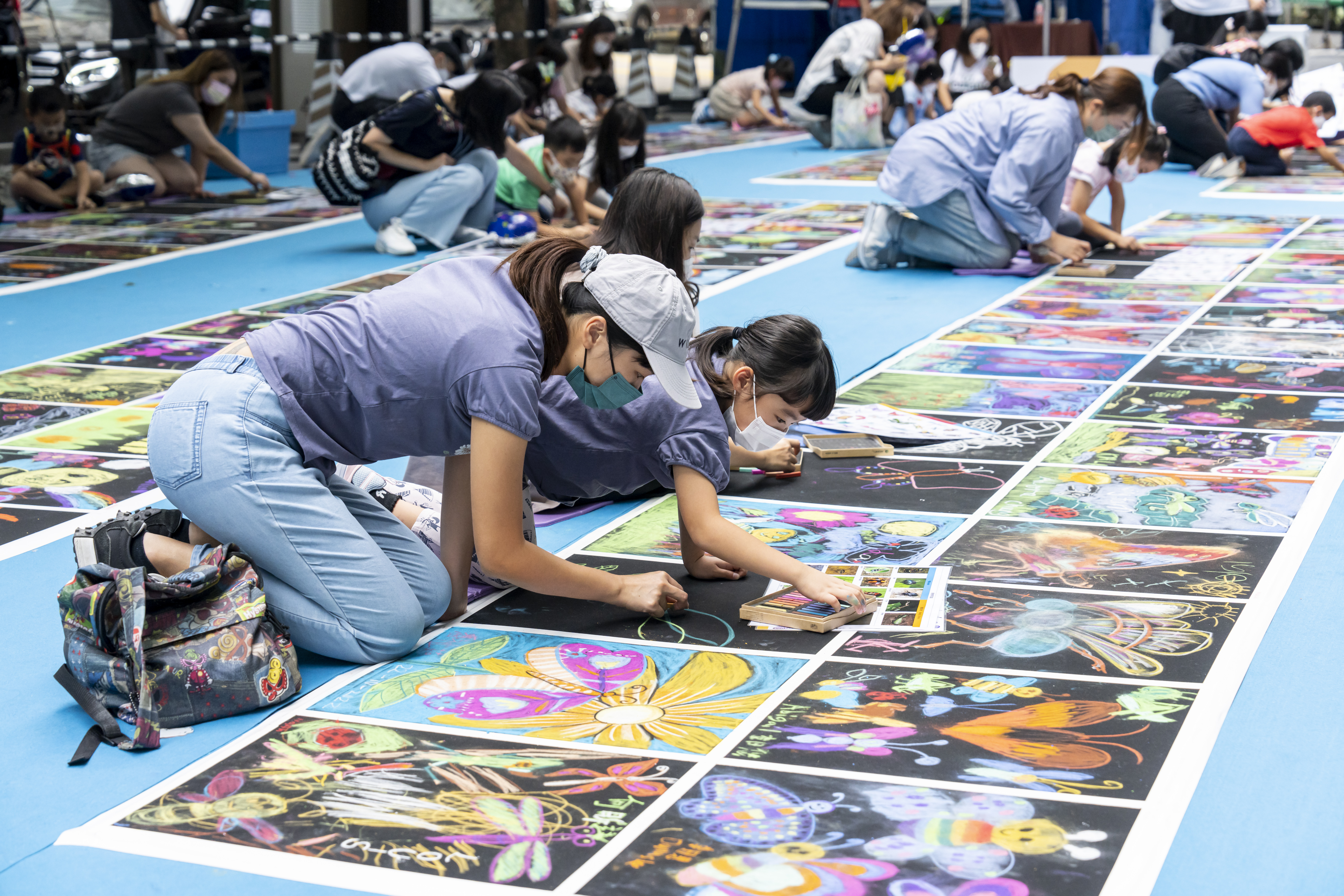
Lee Gardens Street Art Festival

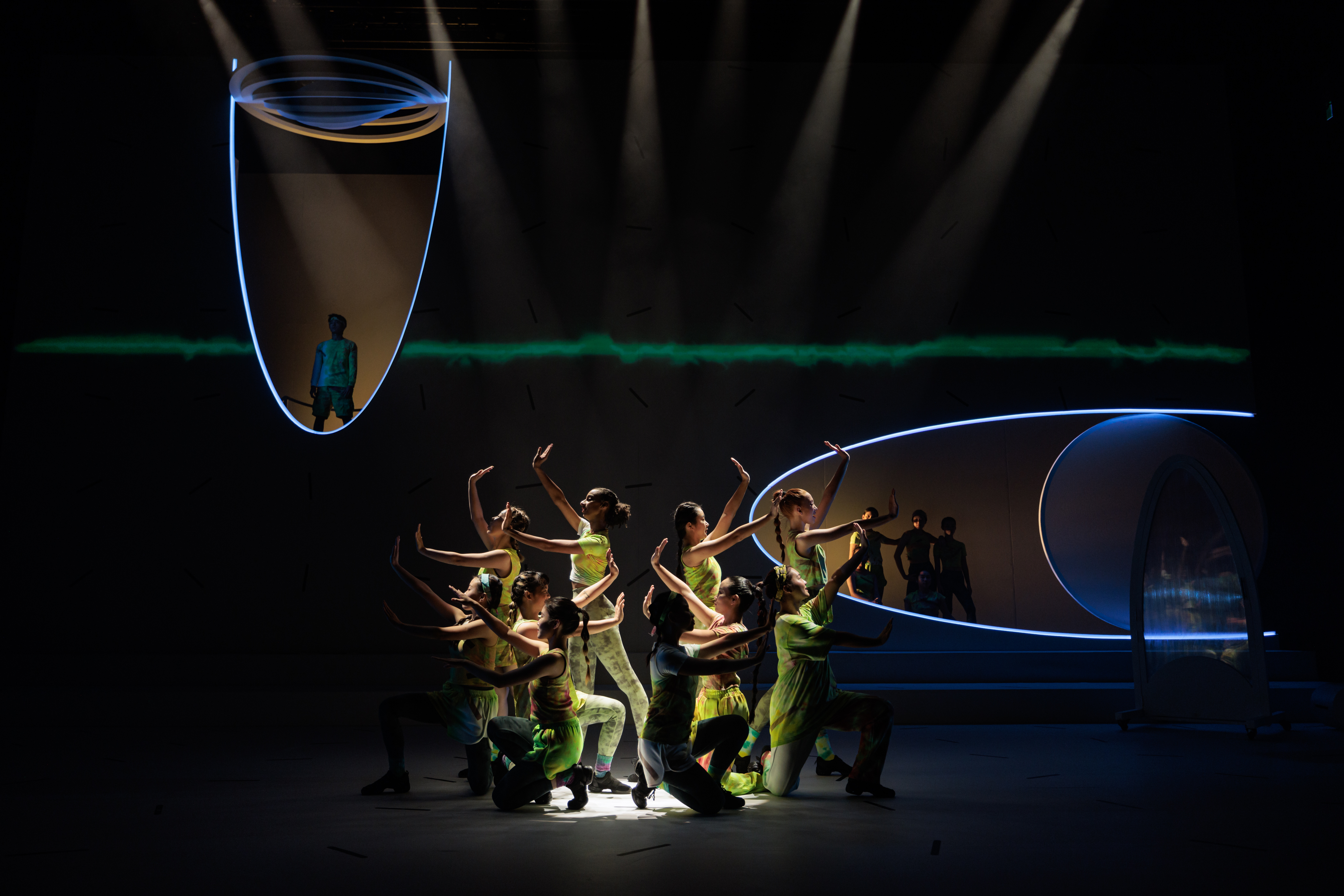
24.7.365 (2023)

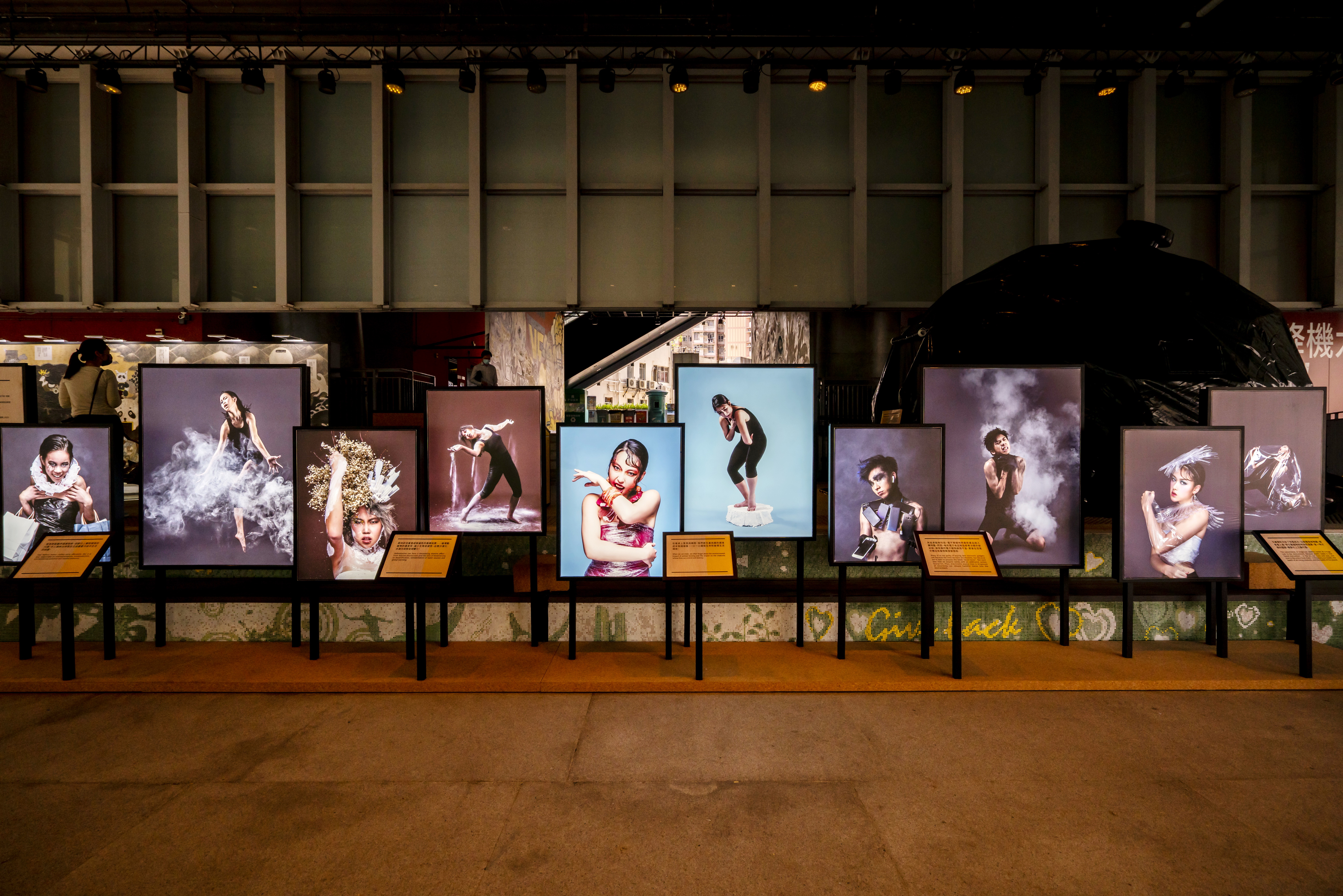
StArt Up exhibition

== Notable collaborations ==
Over the course of 30 years, HKYAF has worked with both local and internationally recognised artists, educators and specialists, including:

- Phil Ashcroft, Xenz and Mr Jago – street artists
- David Branson – theatre director
- Lola Clavel - fashion designer
- Violaine Corradi - composer
- Heidi Duckler – choreographer
- PatPatKate - illustrator
- Ralph Koltai – stage designer
- Maysum - visual artist, makeup artist
- Rory Mullarkey - playwright
- Marsha Roddy - designer
- Tracy Lee Stum – artist
- Uncle – mural artist
- Noble Wong – mural artist

The following are some of the organisations and businesses it has collaborated with:

- City Contemporary Dance Company (CCDC)
- Chung Ying Theatre Company
- International Schools Theatre Association (ISTA)
- Lantern Co. – UK prop designers
- National Youth Theatre of Great Britain
- Third Rail Projects - New York site-specific dance company

== Notable alumni ==
The following people attended HKYAF events as young people:

- Ansonbean (Anton Chan Ngai-san) - singer
- Cletus Chan - actor
- Natalie Hsu - actor
- Sadie Kaye – author, actor, filmmaker and TV presenter
- Matthew Leonhart - actor
- Jade Ma - actor
- Shannon Murphy - TV and film director
- Alistair So - actor
- Isabella Wei - dancer, actor
