= Heidi Duckler Dance Theatre =

American dance theatre

Heidi Duckler Dance Theatre has been creating site-specific productions since 1985. Originally incorporated as Collage Dance Theatre (CDT) in 1988, the company has created and presented over 100 dance performances in Los Angeles, New York City, Miami, Las Vegas, Seattle, Portland, Atlanta, Montreal, Hong Kong, and Russia. In 2010, Heidi Duckler Dance Theatre celebrated its 25th anniversary; Duckler was recognized with two significant honors: an American Masterpieces Award from the National Endowment for the Arts to tour Heidi Duckler Dance Theatre’s signature work Laundromatinee; and a commission to be a part of the Night International Festival of Music & Dance on the Volga in Russia. Heidi Duckler Dance Theatre works exclusively outside of the traditional proscenium stage setting.

== Mission and artistic direction ==
The company's founder and artistic director is choreographer Heidi Duckler. Her work has been commissioned by companies including Miami Light, Grand Performances, REDCAT, Aben Dans in Denmark, Brookfield Properties, and the Hong Kong Youth Arts Foundation. She has participated in the Los Angeles County Arts Commission's Arts Leadership Initiative and served on the City of Los Angeles Mayor's Cultural Master Plan Advisory Committee. Heidi Duckler was named "the reigning queen of site-specific performance" by the Los Angeles Times.

Heidi Duckler Dance Theatre creates performance events in nontraditional spaces, commercial buildings, and diverse neighborhoods to redefine the relationship between audience and art.

Heidi Duckler Dance Theatre has codified the company’s community engagement into five sectors:

- Cross-cultural and community dialogues, Q&As, & workshops
- Open company rehearsal in public sites
- Multi-day workshops crafted for high school/university dancers
- Lectures at local schools, colleges, and organizations by Heidi Duckler Dance Theatre Administration and artists
- Curriculum-based residencies constructed for the non-dancer that take place in schools and community centers

The Dance Theatre has a sister company based in Portland, Oregon, the Heidi Duckler Dance Theatre/Northwest. This company pursues a similar mission and initiates collaborations with artists and communities of the Pacific Northwest.

== Selected performance history ==
The company's performances are often associated with particular locations:

Laundromatinee (2006)
This was CDT's most recognizable site-specific work, first seen at the Thriftywash in Santa Monica. It was also performed in a laundromat for the Cultural Council's Sitelines Festival in Lower Manhattan.
Longing in Hong Kong (2007)
Tong Chong Street, Hong Kong
Oh Cosmonaut, She Looks for Where She was Born (2010)
9th International Festival on the Volga, Yaroslavl & Kotroma, Russia
Governing Bodies (2010)
Los Angeles City Hall, Los Angeles, CA
A Trace of Lipstick (2011)
[spf:a] Gallery, Culver City, CA
Phoenix Art Museum, Phoenix, AZ
Laurel Hardware Space, West Hollywood, CA
A Gallerina’s Guide (2011)
Los Angeles County Museum of the Arts, Los Angeles, CA
Cleopatra, CEO. (2012)
Paul Hastings Tower, 51st Floor, Los Angeles, CA
Expulsion – Koreatown & Little Ethiopia (2012)
A vacant lot in Los Angeles, CA
