= Angel Eyes (Lime song) =

Single by Lime

from the album Lime III
- Released: 1983
- Recorded: 1983
- Length: 7:15
- Label: Polygram
- Songwriters: Denis and Denyse LePage
- Producers: Jack White, Robbie Buchanan

Lime singles chronology
"Guilty" (1983)	"Angel Eyes" (1983)	"On The Grid" (1983)

"Angel Eyes" is a song by Canadian duo Denis and Denyse LePage (then husband and wife) recording as Lime. The song was the second single from their third album Lime III in 1983 and peaked at #12 on the Billboard Dance Music Chart in November of that year. The record received an epic club remix by noted duo M and M in 1985.
