= Disco Inferno (musical) =

1970s jukebox musical written by Jai Sepple

- Music: Various
- Lyrics: Various
- Book: Jai Sepple
- Premiere: 2004: Harlow Playhouse, Harlow
- Productions: 2004 London Premiere; 2006 London Revival; 2012 UK Tour

Disco Inferno is a 2004 jukebox musical written by Jai Sepple. Set in the East End of London in 1976, the show features songs from the 1970s and is loosely based on the story of Faust.

== Original productions ==
The musical debuted at the Queens Theatre, Hornchurch in 1999 with revised revivals at the Towngate Theatre, Basildon in 2004 the Kenneth More Theatre, Ilford in 2006.

== Character list ==
The characters in Disco Inferno were named after well-known characters from songs of the era, such as "Jumpin' Jack Flash", "Wuthering Heights" and "Lady Marmalade".

- Jack - A young and impressionable wannabe 'superstar'
- Jane - A frequent at the ‘Disco Inferno’ and Jack’s long suffering girlfriend
- Tom - Jack's awkward, nerdish best friend and boyfriend of Maggie
- Maggie - Jane’s clumsy, funny and kind best friend, and girlfriend of Tom
- Heathcliffe - An egotistical, malevolent singer in the 'Disco Inferno' and Kathy’s tiresome and unpleasant boyfriend
- Kathy - A flirtatious frequent at the ‘Disco Inferno’ and Heathecliffes forbearing girlfriend
- Terry - DJ at the ‘Disco Inferno’ and friend to Jack and Tom
- Duke - An aging rocker and owner of the nightclub
- Lady Marmalade - A record label scout
- Nick Diablo - Eccentric English fashion guru
- Lily - A flamboyant barman

The character of Nick Diablo was omitted from both the 2006 and 2012 productions and Lily were omitted from the 2012 UK tour. Some of the characters names' were changed in the 2012 UK tour: Lady Marmalade was renamed Lucretia MacEvil, Kathy was renamed Roxanne and Terry was renamed Billy.

== Original casts ==
Characters	London Premiere (2004)	London Revival (2006)	UK Tour (2012)
Jack	Jai Sepple	Jai Sepple	Sam Attwater
Jane	Jude Stoughton	Caroline Koutsoudes	Dani Harmer
Tom	Richard Stoughton	Dan Peek	Johnathan Tweedie
Maggie	TBC	Robyn Gowers	Joanna O'Hare
Heathcliffe	Nick Lupton	Steve Taylor	Matthew Goodgame
Kathy / Roxanne	TBC	Sherona Knight	Jennifer Potts
Lady Marmalade	Harri Sepple	Harri Sepple	Javine Hylton
Duke	Steve Taylor	Mark Brock	Joe Connors
Terry / Billy	Simon Prynn	Damien Lewis	Michael Watson
Lily	Dave Roberts	Jamie Riley	—
Nick Diablo	Dave Adams	—	—

== Plot synopsis ==
The show takes place in 1976, following an aspiring musical ‘Jack’ who works at a nightclub in London, called the ‘Disco Inferno’ Working late one night, Jack meets Lady Marmalade an incarnation of the Devil disguised as a record labels agent. Dreaming of becoming successful, he makes a pact with her, trading his soul to fulfill his dream.

Jack soon becomes an international success, making appearances on radio and television shows, but success proves hollow. He has the fame and fortune he's always dreamed of but is losing something far more important – his girlfriend, Jane and his best friend, Tom. One disaster quickly follows another. If only he could turn back time... If only he could make one more deal, trading all he now has for something far more important... love

== Performances ==
Disco Inferno has been performed around the world since it initial debut, countries have included the United Kingdom, Hong Kong, Singapore, China, Jamaica, Sweden, New Zealand, Australia, Pakistan and Norway.

== Music ==
Generally due to copyright restrictions in different countries songs have varied from production to production. The 2012 UK Tour version of the script was considerably revised.

=== 2004 London premiere ===
==== Act One ====
- Overture (Instrumental)
- Celebration/ A Night To Remember (Jack & Company)
- If You Leave Me Now (Heathcliffe, Kathy, Jane & Jack)
- You Got What It Takes (Heathcliffe)
- Space Oddity / I Lost My Heart to a Starship Trooper (Terry & Company)
- Crocodile Rock (Duke, Jack, Tom & Terry)
- Kissing in the Back Row (Tom & Company)
- Hot Stuff (Lady Marmalade & Acolytes)
- Some Girls (Tom & Guys)
- You to Me Are Everything (Jack, Jane & Company)
- Street Life (Kathy)
- Village People Medley (Terry, Tom, Jack & Company)
- Brown Eyed Girl (Jack & Company)
- Leader of the Gang (Heathcliffe)
- Pop Muzik (Nick Diablo & Company)
- Money Money Money (Jane, Kathy & Girls)
- Don't Stop Me Now (Jack & Company)

==== Act Two ====
- Whole Lotta Lovin' (Instrumental)
- Waterloo (Abba)
- Do Ya Think I'm Sexy (Jack & Company)
- Angel Eyes (Jane & Company)
- Staying Alive Medley (Jack & Company)
- This Is It (Maggie & Company)
- Don't Stop Me Now (Jack & Company)
- I Will Survive (Jane)
- Sorry Seems To Be The Hardest Word (Jack)
- Enough Is Enough (Kathy & Jane)
- Don’t Give Up on Us (Jack & Jane)
- Tragedy (Jack, Lady Marmalade & Company)
- Fire (Duke & Company)
- Saturday Night's Alright For Fighting (Heathcliffe & Lady Marmalade)
- Disco Inferno (Jack, Jane & Company)

=== 2006 London revival ===
==== Act One ====
- Overture (Instrumental)
- Celebration (Jack & Company)
- If You Leave Me Now (Heathcliffe, Kathy, Jane & Jack)
- You Got What It Takes (Heathcliffe)
- Crocodile Rock (Duke, Jack, Tom & Terry)
- Kissing in the Back Row (Tom & Company)
- Hot Stuff (Lady Marmalade & Acolytes)
- You to Me Are Everything (Jack, Jane & Company)
- Streetlife (Kathy)
- Boogie Medley (Terry, Tom, Jack & Company)
- Could It Be Magic (Jack & Company)
- Ballroom Blitz (Heathcliffe)
- Money Money Money (Jane, Kathy & Girls)
- Don't Stop Me Now (Jack & Company)

==== Act Two ====
- Killer Queen (Lady Marmalade & Acolytes)
- Waterloo (Abba)
- I Was Made for Dancing (Jack & Company)
- The Winner Takes It All (Jane)
- Staying Alive Medley (Jack & Company)
- This Is It (Maggie & Company)
- Don't Stop Me Now (Jack & Company)
- I Will Survive (Jane)
- Sorry Seems to Be the Hardest Word (Jack)
- Enough Is Enough (Kathy & Jane)
- Don't Give Up on Us Baby (Jack & Jane)
- Tragedy / Bohemian Rhapsody (Jack, Lady Marmalade & Company)
- Devil Woman (Jack & Company)
- Still I'm Sad (Maggie & Company)
- Saturday Night's Alright For Fighting (Heathcliffe & Lady Marmalade)
- Play That Funky Music (Jack & Company)
- Disco Inferno (Jack, Jane & Company)

=== 2012 UK Tour ===
==== Act One ====
- Overture (Instrumental)
- The Best Disco in Town (Heathcliffe & Company)
- Hold Me Close (Jack & Jane)
- You Got What It Takes (Heathcliffe)
- Old Time Rock n Roll (Duke)
- Hot Stuff (Lucretia & Acolytes)
- Let's Make a Deal / Signed, Sealed, Delivered I'm Yours (Lucretia & Acolytes)
- Boogie Shoes (Tom, Jack, Billy & Male Company)
- You to Me Are Everything (Jack, Jane & Company)
- Call Me (Roxanne)
- Relight My Fire (Jack & Company)
- Hell Raiser (Heathcliffe)
- I've Got the Music in Me / Disco Inferno (Jack & Company)

==== Act Two ====
- Entr'Acte / Radio Montage (Instrumental)
- Lucretia MacEvil (Lucretia & Acolytes)
- Whole Lotta Lovin' (Instrumental)
- Y.M.C.A. (Village People)
- Shake Your Groove Thing (Jack & Company)
- If I Can't Have You (Jane)
- I'm in the Mood for Dancing (Maggie, Tom & Company)
- Boogie Medley (Jack & Company)
- I Will Survive (Jane)
- Baby Come Back (Jack & Company)
- Disco Inferno / Night on Disco Mountain (Instrumental)
- Don't Give Up on Us Baby / It's Too Late (Jack & Jane)
- Devil Woman (Jack, Lucretia & Acolytes)
- Highway to Hell (Jack)
- Still I'm Sad (Maggie & Company)
- Spirit in the Sky (Jack, Tom & Company)
- Saturday Night's Alright For Fighting (Heathcliffe & Lucretia)
- Devil's Gun (Heathcliffe, Lucretia & Acolytes)
- Disco Inferno (Jack, Jane & Company)
- Megamix (Company)

== Publishing and representation ==
Disco Inferno is published by various Musical Theatre publishers worldwide.

- UK - Musical Theatre International, MTI Europe
- US - Musical Theatre International, MTI
- Europe - Gallissas Verlag
- Australia / New Zealand - David Spicer Productions

== Cancelled UK tour ==
A new version of Disco Inferno began a tour of the UK in the autumn of 2012. The cast included Sam Attwater as 'Jack', Dani Harmer as 'Jane' and Javine Hylton as 'Lucretia MacEvil'. The tour closed after the first week, with the producer citing 'financial problems'.
