= Your Love (Lime song) =

Single by Lime

from the album Your Love
- Released: 1980
- Recorded: 1980
- Genre: Hi-NRG
- Length: 7:14 (Extended 12-inch version); 4:41 (single version)
- Label: Prism
- Songwriters: Denis and Denyse LePage
- Producer: Joe La Greca

Lime singles chronology
"It's You" (1980)	"Your Love" (1980)	"You're My Magician" (1981)

Music video
- "Your Love" on YouTube

"Your Love" is a song by the Canadian, Montreal-based vocal group Lime, first released as a 12-inch 33 rpm dance mix in 1980. Also released as a 7-inch 45 rpm radio single, the song spent one week at number 1 on the U.S. Billboard Hot Dance Club Play chart in April 1981.
