= Lime (band) =

Canadian disco band

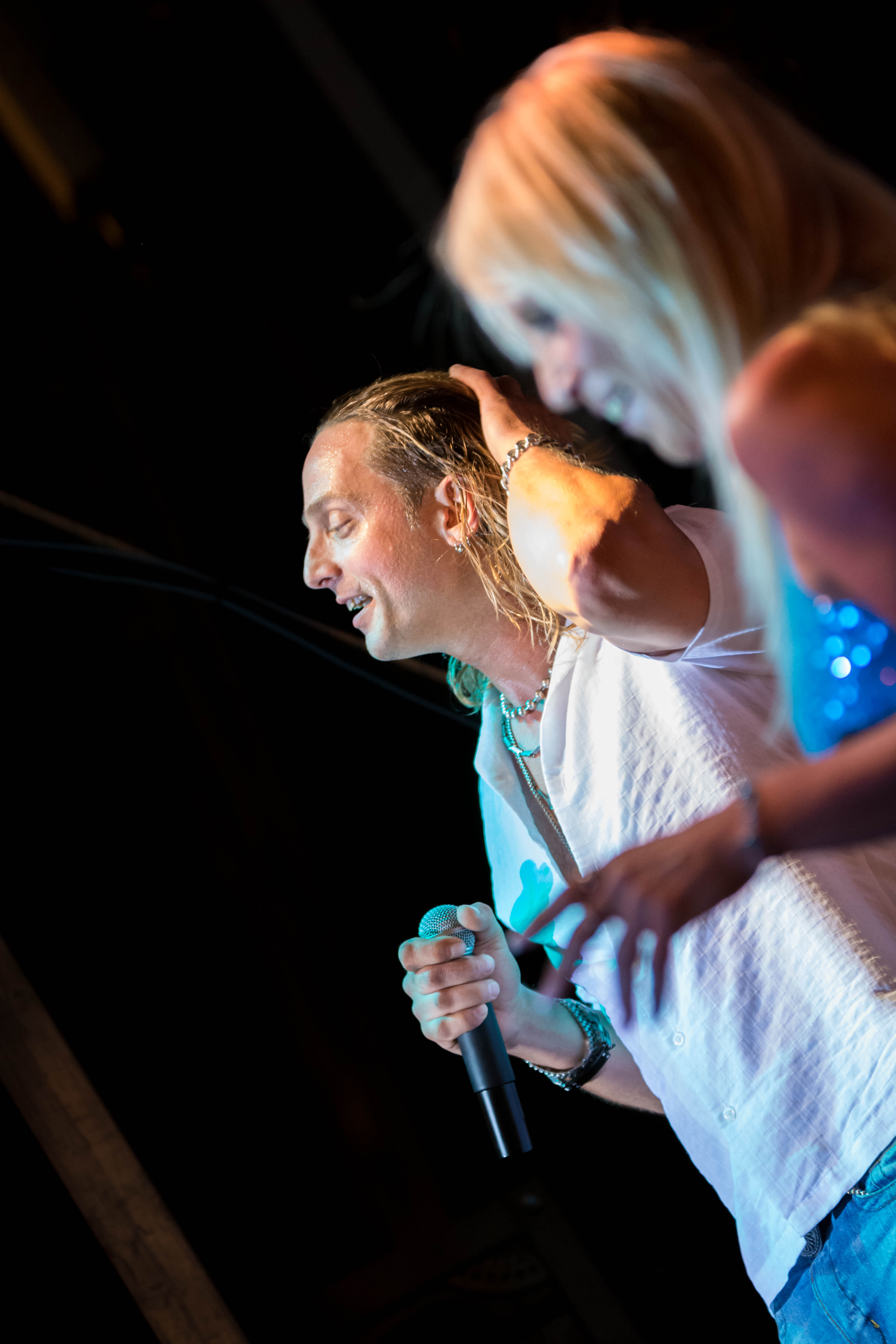
- Lime performing in 2013

Background information
- Origin: Montreal, Quebec, Canada
- Genres: Hi-NRG, post-disco, dance-pop
- Instruments: TR-808, Jupiter-8, Juno-60, MC-4
- Years active: 1980–present
- Labels: Matra Records; Prism Records; Polydor/PolyGram; Unidisc Records; Critique/Atco/Atlantic Records

Lime is a Canadian disco band from Montreal, Quebec. The group was originally composed of married couple Denis and Denyse LePage who had a 1981 number one U.S. Dance hit with "Your Love". They continued to perform as recently as 2018, although others have also performed under the name of Lime.

== History ==
In 1979, Denis LePage wrote, arranged, and released an instrumental 12-inch single vinyl record called "The Break" under the name Kat Mandu. It appeared first on Unidisc Records. The single was successful and peaked at number three on Billboard's Disco chart. Lime released their debut album Your Love in 1981. The title track was a gold record and a #1 Billboard Disco-chart hit in the U.S. 1982 saw the release of Lime's second album Lime II supported by the single "Babe We're Gonna Love Tonight", which reached #6 on the Billboard Dance Chart.

Although known for their work with Unidisc, the band also had ties to the Matra label. Later in the band's run, Denis transitioned and they continued to perform together; however, there have also been performances by Joy Dorris and Rob Hubertz under the brand of Lime.

Denis LePage died from cancer on August 21, 2023, at the age of 74. Denyse LePage died from a stroke on May 20, 2026, one day short of her 76th birthday.

== Discography ==
=== Studio albums ===
- Your Love (1981)
- Lime II (1982)
- Lime 3 (1983)
- Sensual Sensation (1984)
- Lime – The Greatest Hits (1985)
- Unexpected Lovers (1985)
- Take the Love (1986)
- A Brand New Day (1988)
- Caroline (1991)
- Stillness of the Night (1998)
- Love Fury (2002)

=== Singles ===
Year	Title	Peak chart positions	
Year	Title	US Dance	UK
1981	"Your Love"	1	—
1981	"You're My Magician"	—	—
1982	"Baby, I'll Be Yours / Agent 406"	—	—
1982	"Wake Dream"	—	—
1982	"Come and Get Your Love"	18	—
1982	"A Man and a Woman"	—	—
1982	"Babe, We're Gonna Love Tonight"	6	—
1983	"Angel Eyes"	12	—
1983	"Guilty"	22	—
1984	"I Don't Wanna Lose You"	—	—
1984	"Take It Up"	—	—
1984	"My Love"	—	—
1984	"Give Me Your Body" / "On the Grid"	—	—
1985	"Unexpected Lovers"	6	78
1985	"Alive and Well" / "I'm Falling in Love"	—	—
1986	"Take the Love"	—	—
1987	"Gold Digger"	—	—
1988	"Brand New Day"	—	—
1989	"Sentimentally Yours"	—	—
1991	"Babe, We're Gonna Love Tonight (Remix)"	—	—
1992	"Come and Get Your Love (Remix)"	—	—
"—" denotes releases that did not chart or were not released in that territory.

=== Compilations ===
- The Greatest Hits (1985)

== See also ==
- List of number-one dance hits (Canada)
- Timeline of Billboard number-one dance club songs
- List of artists who reached number one on the U.S. Dance Club Songs chart
