= Beat =

Beat, beats, or beating may refer to:

== Common uses ==
- Assault, inflicting physical harm or unwanted physical contact
- Battery (crime), a criminal offense involving unlawful physical contact
- Battery (tort), a civil wrong in common law of intentional harmful or offensive contact
- Corporal punishment, punishment intended to cause physical pain
- Patrol, or beat, a group of personnel assigned to monitor a specific area
  - Beat (police), the territory that a police officer patrols
  - Gay beat, an area frequented by gay men
- Strike (attack), repeatedly and violently striking a person or object
- Victory, success achieved in personal combat, military operations or in any competition
- Beating (hunt), driving game out of areas of cover during a hunt

== Arts, entertainment and media ==
=== Fictional characters ===
- Beat, an anthro fox in the animated series "Motto! Majime ni Fumajime Kaiketsu Zorori"
- Beat, in the video game Eternal Sonata
- Beat, in the video game Jet Set Radio
- Beat, in the video game The World Ends with You
- Beat, a robot bird in the Mega Man video game franchise
- Beat, in the video game Unbeatable

=== Film and TV ===
- Beat (1997 film), a South Korean action film
- Beat (1998 film), a 1998 Japanese film
- Beat (2000 film), a film about writer William Seward Burroughs
- Beat (2022 film), an Australian independent film starring Alexandra Jensen
- Beat (filmmaking), a small amount of action resulting in a pause in dialogue
- Beat (TV series), a 2018 German thriller series
- "Beats", a Series B episode of the television series QI (2004)
- Beats (2019 British film), based on the play by Kieran Hurley
- Beats (2019 American film), a coming-of-age drama

=== Music ===
==== Groups ====
- Beat (Finnish band)
- The Beat (British band), an English band
- The Beat (American band), a power pop band
- Beat (American band), an American band containing and featuring multiple members from King Crimson

==== Albums and songs ====
- Beat (Bowery Electric album), 1996
- Beat (King Crimson album), 1982
- "Beat" (song), by Kaela Kimura, 2005
- "Beats", a song by AJR from the 2019 album Neotheater

==== Music channels ====
- Beats Music, an Apple music streaming service
- MTV Beats, music TV channel of India
- Beat 102 103, an Irish radio station

==== Other uses in music ====
- Beat (music), the basic time in music and music theory
- Beat music, a popular music genre
- Drum beat, a rhythmic pattern
- Beat (acoustics), an interference pattern between two sounds of slightly different frequencies

=== Other uses in arts, entertainment and media ===
- Beat, an intentional pause for emphasis in comic timing
- Beats (video game), 2007
- Unit of action, or beat, in acting
- Beat Generation
- Beat Magazine

== People ==
=== Given name ===
- Beat (name), a Swiss German male given name

=== Surname ===
- Aone Beats (born 1984) Nigerian record producer
- Billy Beats (1871–1936) British footballer
- Cohen Beats (Michael Cohen, born 1986), Israeli record producer
- Duda Beat (born 1987), Brazilian singer and songwriter
- Eno Beats (Enock Kisakye, born 1991), Ugandan record producer
- Jackie Beat, drag persona of Kent Fuher (born 1963)
- Laxio Beats (Bernard Antwi-Darko, born 1987), Ghanaian record producer
- Mizz Beats (Iman Yanee, fl. from 2004), British record producer
- Rico Beats (Ricardo Lamarre, fl. from 2004), American record producer

== Transportation ==
- Beat (app), a ride-hailing app
- Beat, a model of the Daiichi Kosho Whisper paramotor
- Chevrolet Beat, a car
- Honda Beat, a car
- Honda FC50, or Honda Beat, a motor scooter

== Other uses ==
- Beat, a time unit of Swatch Internet Time, and a range of watches
- Beat (acoustics), an interference pattern between two sounds of slightly different frequencies
- Beat (charity), a British charity that supports people with eating disorders
- Beat (drink), a citrus-flavored soft drink
- Beat (fencing), a simple preparatory motion
- Beating against the wind, a sailing manoeuvre
- Beats Electronics, or Beats by Dre, an American producer of audio products

== See also ==
- The Beat (disambiguation)
- Back Beat (disambiguation)
- Beat It (disambiguation)
- Beet (disambiguation)
- Big beat (disambiguation)
- Beatdown (disambiguation)
- Downbeat (disambiguation)
- On the Beat (disambiguation)
- Upbeat (disambiguation)
- Beat Generation, a literary movement
- Beat reporting, a genre of journalism
- Beat 'em up, a video game genre
- Beate, a given name
- Beats International, a British dance music band and hip-hop collective
- Beetroot, or beet, or beets, a vegetable
- Beatzarre, German musician
- "Dr. Beat", a 1984 single by Miami Sound Machine
- New beat, Belgian underground music genre
- Saint-Béat, a place in Haute-Garonne, France
