= Beets (disambiguation) =

Beets may refer to:

- Beetroot (vegetable)
- Beet plant (plant of the vegetable)

== Places ==
- Beets, Netherlands, a village
- Nij Beets, Netherlands (New Beets), a village

== People ==
- Betty Lou Beets (1937–2000) executed U.S. murderer
- Dora Beets (1812–1864) Dutch writer
- Nicolaas Beets (1814–1903) Dutch theologian
- Peter Beets (born 1971) Dutch jazz pianist
- Pieter Beets (1900–1996) Dutch cyclist
- Sonja Beets (born 1953) Dutch musician
- Tinker Beets (born 1941) cricketer for Rhodesia
- Tom Beets, Belgian musician, member of the Flanders Recorder Quartet

== Other uses ==
- The Beets, a band from New York
- The Beets, a fictional band from the animated television series Doug
- Beets Special, single seat recreational kit plane

== See also ==
- Beet (disambiguation)
