= On the Beat =

On the Beat may refer to:

== Films ==
- On the Beat (1962 film), directed by Robert Asher
- On the Beat (1995 film), directed by Ning Ying
- On the Beat (2011 film), also known as Sur le rythme, directed by Charles-Olivier Michaud

== Music ==
- On the Beat!, a 2007 album by The KBC
- "On the Beat" (song), 1940 record by George Formby Jr.
- "On the Beat", 1981 single by B. B. & Q. Band from their self-titled album

== Television ==
- On the Beat (game show), an American game show that premiered in 2001

== See also ==
- Beat (disambiguation)
