= Pieter Lodewijk Muller =

Dutch historian (1842–1904)

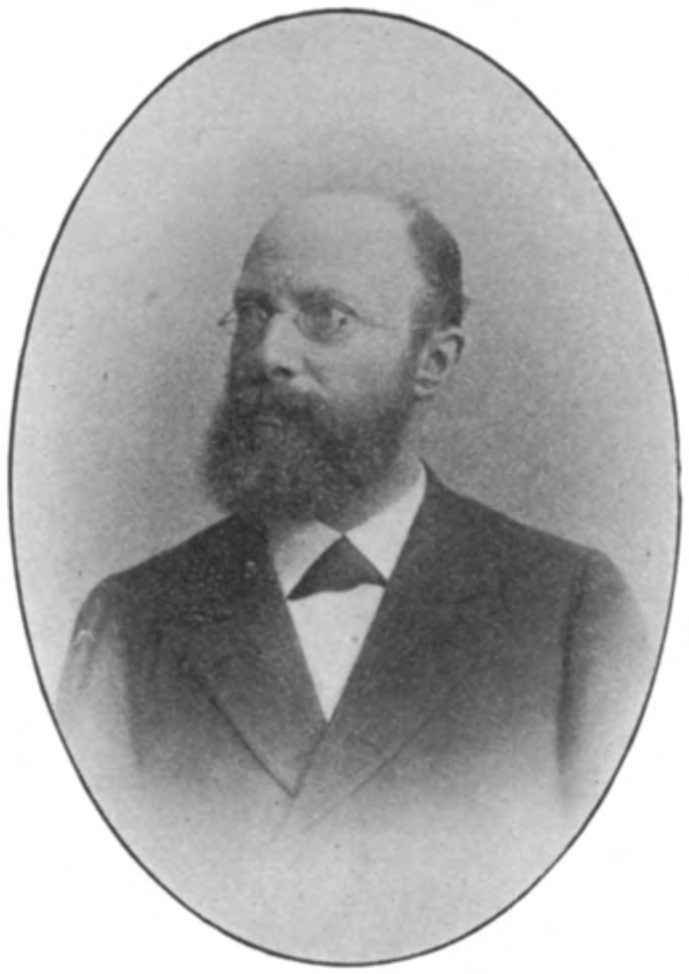
- Born: 9 November 1842; Koog aan de Zaan, Netherlands
- Died: 25 December 1904; Gardone Riviera, Lombardy, Italy
- Occupation(s): Historian writer
- Spouse: Dorothea "Dora" Bohn (1846–1930)
- Parent(s): Christiaan Muller (1813–1896); Isabella Muller de Cercq (1814–1844)

Pieter Lodewijk Muller (9 November 1842 – 25 December 1904) was a Dutch historian. He published numerous works of history and also contributed nearly two hundred entries to the German Allgemeine Deutsche Biographie (German Dictionary of Universal Biography).

== Life ==
Muller was born in Koog aan de Zaan (now in Zaanstad), the third son of Christiaan Muller (1813–1896) and Isabella Muller de Cercq (1814–1844). Christiaan Muller was a Mennonite preacher in Koog aan de Zaan and Zaandijk. His mother, who came from a prosperous Dutch family, died when he was only two. The Muller name, written in older documents as Müller, reflected the family's German provenance. Pieter's grandfather, Samuel, and his great uncle, Johannes, had relocated around 1800 from Krefeld to Amsterdam to set up a bookshop. Pieter's uncle, Frederik Muller (1817–1881) had by 1842 taken over the business and became celebrated as an Amsterdam book dealer and publisher.

== Output ==
- Onze gouden eeuw: de republiek der Vereenigde Nederlanden in haar bloeitijd geschetst (1883/1897)
- Regesta Hannonensia (Den Haag 1882)
- De Unie van Utrecht (Utrecht 1878)
- Wilhelm von Oranien und Georg Friedrich von Waldeck (1873–80)
- De Staat der Vereenigde Nederlanden in de jaren zijner wording (1572–1594) (1872)
- Nederlands eerste betrekkingen met Oostenrijk (1870)
- Hugo Grotius als latijnsch dichter beschouwd (1867)
- De geschiedenis der Regeering in de Nader Geunieerde Provinciën tot aan de komst van Leicester (1579–1585) (Dissertation 1868)

Muller also wrote numerous essays on Dutch history for academic journals

A sickly child, he attended the nearby village school in Koog for as long as possible, but switched when he was nine to the French School in Zaandijk. Between 1861 and 1867 he studied philology and history as a student at Leiden, with a particular focus on Dutch history in the 17th century, known to Dutch scholars as the country's Golden Age ("Gouden Eeuw"). This would remain the core of his work as an historian for the rest of his life. He received his doctorate in December 1867 for a piece of work on the history of government in the Netherlands between 1579 and 1585, which was critical period in the Eighty Years' War, After receiving his doctorate he went to Brussels where he was employed for several months gathering information for the Spanish ambassador. This was followed by a study tour lasting nearly a year which took in Berlin, Dresden, Vienna and Heidelberg. Returning home in April 1869 he settled in Haarlem, to where his father, having remarried, had moved while Pieter was away. He then took a teaching job at the Gymnasium (school) in Leiden.

In 1874 he married Dorothea (Dora) Bohn (1846–1930), daughter of the publisher Pieter François Bohn (1800–1873) and the Haarlem writer Dorothea Petronella Beets (1812–1864). That same year he enrolled temporarily in the Civil Service and took a position at the National Archives in The Hague, staying till 1877.

In 1878 he was given a teaching chair in Dutch History at Groningen, which he held till 1883, which was when he switched to his alma mater, Leiden. In 1902 he was forced by serious lung illness to give up teaching, and spent the winter by Lake Garda. By early 1903 he appeared to have recovered sufficiently to resume his work, but the disease then came back and he returned south. He died aged 62 at Gardone Riviera, by this time in Italy, on Christmas Day, 1904.

== Evaluation ==
Muller's academic contribution was above all to the history of the Netherlands since independence: his various books on the Dutch Golden Age became standard works.
