= Beet (disambiguation) =

Beet is a plant, the taproot portion of which is eaten as a vegetable, called beets or beetroot.

Beet may also refer to:

== People ==
- George Beet (disambiguation), the name of two English cricketers
- Gordon Beet (1939-1994), English cricketer
- Harry Churchill Beet (1873-1946), English recipient of the Victoria Cross
- Peter Beet (1937-2005), British doctor
- Beet Algar (1894-1989), New Zealand rugby player

== Other uses ==
- Beet (album), by Eleventh Dream Day, 1989
- Beet the Vandel Buster, a manga series
- 4026 Beet, an asteroid
- Beet River, in Indonesia

== See also ==
- Beets (disambiguation)
- Beat (disambiguation)
- Beate, a given name
- Chard, or silver beet, or leaf beet
- Mangelwurzel, or field beet
- Sea beet
- Sugar beet
