= Beatdown =

Beatdown or Beat Down may refer to:

- Beatdown (video game), 1999
- Beatdown hardcore, a musical genre
- "Beat Down (song)", a song by Steve Aoki and Angger Dimas
- Beat Down: Fists of Vengeance, a 2005 video game
- Beatdown, a Magic: The Gathering compilation set
- Beat Down, an EP by Para One

== See also ==
- Beat (disambiguation)
- Assault
