= Starlet =

Starlet may refer to:

== Entertainment ==
- Starlet (film), a 2012 independent dramatic film directed by Sean Baker
- The Starlet, reality TV show
- The Starlets, a girl group
- "Starlet" (Frank Stubbs Promotes), a 1993 television episode

== Transport ==
- Toyota Starlet, a car produced between 1973 and 1999
- Corby Starlet, an airplane
- Stolp SA-500 Starlet, the American homebuilt aircraft design

== Other uses ==
- Starlet (drag queen), South African-born English drag queen
- Starlet sea anemone, a species of sea anemone
- Starlet, a processor in the Hollywood graphics chip of the Nintendo Wii
- Starlets Academy, a school in Port Harcourt, Rivers State, Nigeria

=== Alternate spellings ===
- Starlette and Stella, French geodetic satellites
- Ivy Lies, previously Starlett, a New Zealand rock band
- "Starlette", a 1981 song by B. B. & Q. Band from The B. B. & Q. Band
- "Starlett", a 2004 song by Mother Superior from 13 Violets
- Starlett O'Hara, a character from "Went with the Wind!", a 1976 Carol Burnett Show sketch

== See also ==
- Star (disambiguation)
- Sterlet, a species of sturgeon
