= The Big Beat =

The Big Beat may refer to:

- The Big Beat (Art Blakey album), 1960
- The Big Beat (Machinations album), 1986
- The Big Beat (Johnnie Ray album), 1957
- The Big Beat, a 1990 album by Holloee Poloy, with Edyta Bartosiewicz
- "The Big Beat", 1958 song and hit single by Fats Domino B-side of "I Want You to Know"
- "The Big Beat" (song), a 1980 song by Billy Squier
- "The Big Beat", a song written by Brian Wilson for Bob & Sheri that was later rewritten as "Do You Remember?"
  - The Big Beat 1963, an archival compilation featuring various artists related to the Beach Boys
- The Big Beat (film), a 1958 Universal Pictures film
- The Big Beat (TV program), a 1957 American music and dance television program that aired on ABC

== See also ==
- Big beat (disambiguation)
- "The Big Big Beat", song
