= The KBC =

English band

- Origin: Preston, Lancashire, England
- Genres: Indie, dance-punk, post-punk revival
- Years active: 2004–2010
- Label: High Voltage Sounds
- Members: James Mulholland; Ric Ormerod; Michael Brown
- Website: http://www.thekbc.net/

The KBC are an indie band from Preston, Lancashire, England. The group released two albums, On the Beat (2007) and The Trick (2008), which were successful in Japan.

== Band members ==
- James Mulholland – vocals, keyboards, guitar
- Ric Ormerod – bass
- Michael Brown – drums

== Discography ==
=== Studio albums ===
Both records were only released in Japan.

- 2007: On the Beat!
- 2008: The Trick

=== Singles and EPs ===
- "Trippin'" (High Voltage Sounds)

Released 7 March 2005. Limited pressing 500 lemon 7".

- "Pride Before The Fall" (High Voltage Sounds)

Released 6 February 2006. Limited pressing 500 white 7"/500 CD.

- "Sherlock Groove Holmes" (Playlouder Recordings)

Released 29 May 2006 as download only.

- "Not Anymore" (High Voltage Sounds)

Released 10 July 2006. Limited pressing 2500 7"/2500 CD.

- "Test the Water" (High Voltage Sounds)

Released 27 November 2006

- Boxed Beats & Shelved Rhythms EP (Fabtone Records)

Released 6 September 2006. A collection of previous singles and exclusive remixes released on enhanced CD format.

- "Walking Disaster" (Scattergraph)

Released 22 October 2007.

- La Musique EP (Fabtone Records)

Released 7 November 2007.
