= Backbeat (disambiguation) =

Backbeat is a rhythmic accentuation on even beats.

Backbeat may also refer to:

- Backbeat (biography), a biography of drummer Earl Palmer
- Backbeat (film) (1994), chronicles the early days of The Beatles in Hamburg, Germany
  - Backbeat (soundtrack), original soundtrack of the 1994 film Backbeat
- Back Beat Records, record label
- Backbeat Books, an imprint of American publisher Hal Leonard LLC
- The Backbeats, a vocal group on season 2 of The Sing Off

== See also ==
- Beat (music)#Downbeat
- Off-beat (music)
- Syncopation
