= B. B. & Q. Band =

Italian-American post-disco band

- Origin: Bologna, Italy; New York City, United States
- Genres: Post-disco
- Years active: 1979–1987
- Labels: Capitol, Elektra
- Past members: Chieli Minucci; Curtis Hairston; Kevin Nance; Kevin Robinson; Mauro Malavasi; Paolo Gianolio; Paris Ford; Terry Silverlight; Timmy Allen; Tony Bridges; Dwayne Perdue; Curtis Styles; Lori Rose

B. B. & Q. Band (which stands for the Brooklyn, Bronx, and Queens Band), was an American post-disco band formed in New York City in 1979 and disbanded in 1987.

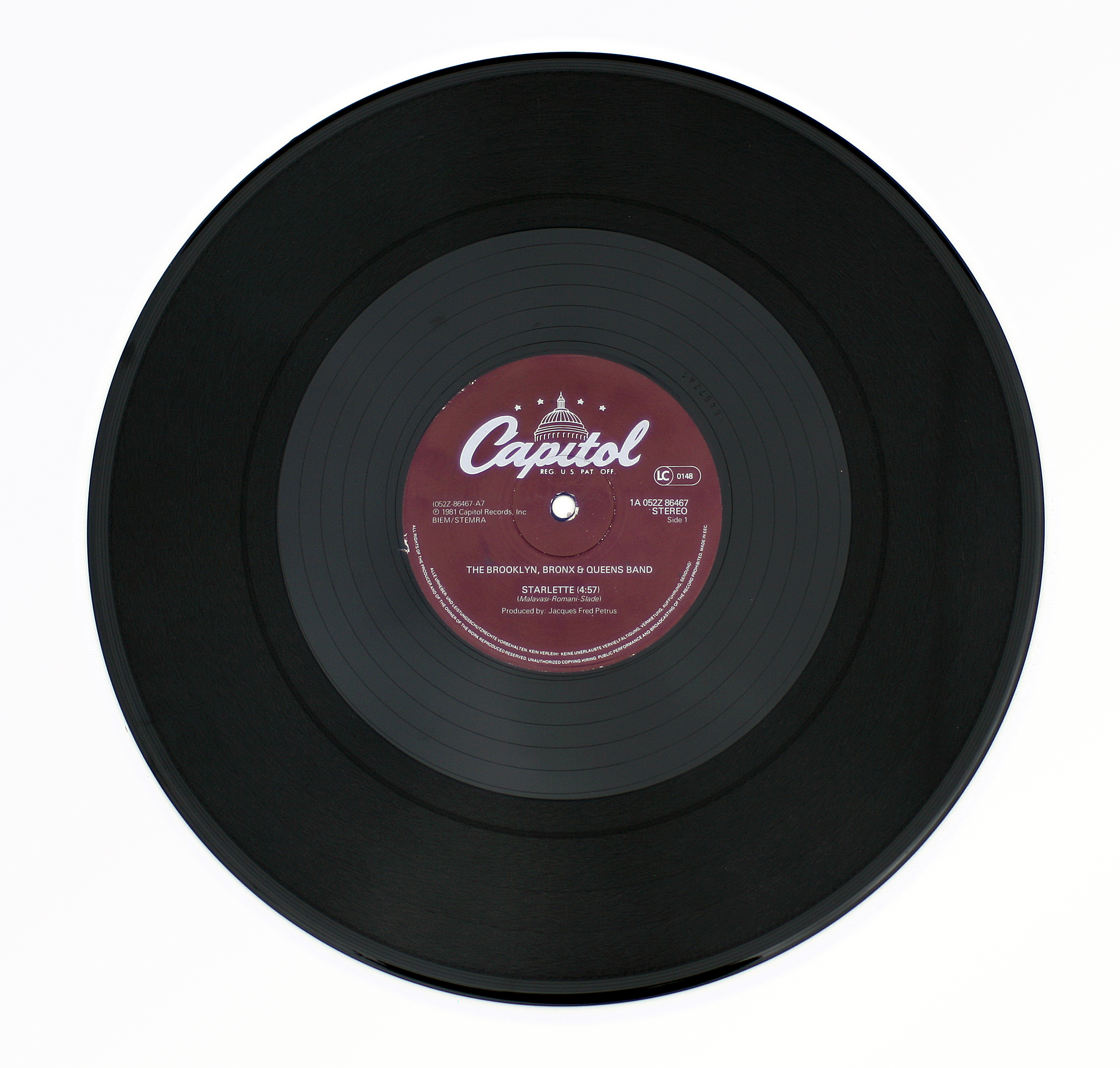
A twelve-inch record by the band

== Overview ==
=== The background ===
The B. B. & Q. Band was a studio concept created in 1979 by the businessman Jacques Fred Petrus. After the success with Change in 1980, and also with Macho and the Peter Jacques band in the late 1970s, Petrus and his close co-worker Italian Mauro Malavasi decided to launch a new project, named after the three boroughs in New York City that the band members came from. Fred Petrus pulled several musicians together of which New York session bassist Paris Ford (credited as Peewee Ford) and his musicians became the band.

=== The successful debut ===
The self-titled debut album on Capitol provided several melodies of which Mauro Malavasi wrote all except one. The biggest hit single was "On the Beat", which reached No. 8 on the US Billboard Black Singles chart. Also "Time for Love" (#72 on the same chart) mixed a melody with vocals by the lead singer, Ike Floyd.

After the debut, Petrus invited guitarist Kevin Robinson, a former member of the band Kinky Fox that he had met already in 1980, to lead the band. The new line-up included Chielli Minucci, Kevin Nance, and Tony Bridges and for the first time B. B. & Q. band had a more defined role as a band.

=== Second and third albums ===
The second album release was 1982's All Night Long (#32 on Billboard 's Black Albums chart), which included "All Night Long (She's Got the Moves I Like)" (#32 on Billboard 's Hot Dance Club Play list), "Imagination" (#21 on Billboard 's Black Singles list) and "Children of the Night" (uncharted).

In 1983 Six Million Times hit the market with influences from the Time and Prince. Petrus faced serious economical problems in 1983, and Six Million Times was produced with a tiny budget during five weeks in Bologna. The album did not become a commercial success and Capitol dropped the band.

=== Finale ===
By 1985 Petrus had fixed a contract with Elektra Records, and B. B. & Q. Band was back on track with their last album Genie, including minor hits like the title track "Genie" and "Dreamer". Kae Williams, a former Breakwater member hired by Petrus, wrote all tracks and co-produced the LP in conjunction with Petrus. The album also showed early examples of Curtis Hairston's voice when Petrus invited him to be the new lead singer. The album sold rather well, especially in Europe, but in 1987 the B. B. & Q. Band ended when Petrus was murdered.

"Genie" was released on different labels. In the U.S. "Dreamer" was released as a B-side (with "On the Shelf" as A-side") on the label in Your Face, which was a sublabel of Pretty Pearl Records. Meanwhile, the album "Genie" and accompanying singles "Dreamer" and "Genie" were all released on Pretty Pearl Records/Elektra Records. Both Pretty Pearl Records and Elektra Records logos were used on the record labels. The catalogue numbers were the series used by Elektra Records. This was only the case in the U.S., while in Europe, the album and singles were released by Cooltempo (U.K.), Break (Netherlands) and ZYX (Germany). Furthermore, different pictures were used for the record covers of the album depending on the country of release.

Not only were labels and pictures different. The Shep Pettibone remix of "Dreamer" was included on the U.S. LP, while the European editions of the album included an "album version" of the track. The Shep Pettibone remix was the same as the 12" release on Elektra/Pretty Pearl, while the European album version was the same as the B-side of the 12" "On the shelf" released on in Your Face Records.

=== The Legacy ===
Original lead singer Kevin Robinson recorded a new album, The Legacy, credited to Brooklyn, Bronx & Queens, which included one collaboration with Davide Romani on the track Gotta Keep Movin' On (originally released as a solo recording January 2021). Romani is one of the key musicians on their classic 1980s productions.

== Discography ==
=== Studio albums ===
- The B. B. & Q. Band (1981)
- All Night Long (1982)
- Six Million Times (1983)
- Genie (1985)
- The Legacy (2022)

=== Compilation albums ===
- The Best of the B.B. & Q. Band (1988), Streetheat
- Album Collection (5xCD boxset, 2006) (B.B.& Q. Band and High Fashion), Fonte Records
- Greatest Hits & Essential Tracks (2xCD, 2009), Smith & Co

=== Singles ===
Year	Single	Peak chart positions					Album
Year	Single	US R&B	US Dance	UK	NL	BE	Album
1981	"On the Beat"	8	3	41	16	10	B.B. & Q. Band
1981	"Starlette" (Europe)/"I'll Cut You Loose" (UK)	―	―	―	76	―	B.B. & Q. Band
1981	"Time for Love" (US only)	72	―	―	―	―	B.B. & Q. Band
1982	"Imagination"	21	69	―	―	―	All Night Long
1982	"All Night Long (She's Got the Moves I Like)"	―	32	―	―	―	All Night Long
1983	"Keep It Hot"	―	―	―	―	―	Six Million Times
1983	"She's a Woman"	―	―	―	―	―	Six Million Times
1985	"Genie"	―	―	40	32	―	Genie
1985	"Minutes Away"	—	―	―	―	―	Genie
1985	"On the Shelf"	72	―	―	―	―	Genie
1986	"Main Attraction"	―	―	―	―	―	Genie
1986	"Dreamer"	―	―	35	―	―	Genie
1987	"Ricochet"	―	―	71	―	―	Genie
"—" denotes releases that did not chart or were not released in that territory.
