= Curtis Hairston =

American singer-songwriter

- Born: Curtis Kinnard Hairston; October 10, 1961; Winston-Salem, North Carolina, US
- Died: January 18, 1996 (aged 34) Winston-Salem, North Carolina, US
- Genres: R&B, funk, soul
- Occupations: Singer, songwriter
- Years active: 1980–1995
- Labels: Pretty Pearl Records, Atlantic, Reverse Spin Entertainment,
- Formerly of: B. B. & Q. Band

Curtis Kinnard Hairston (October 10, 1961 – January 18, 1996) was an American soul/funk vocalist, who had a number of top 75 hit singles in the UK and US, both as a solo artist and as a featured artist in the B. B. & Q. Band. Hairston's signature hit came in 1985, when he reached No. 13 in the UK Singles Chart with "I Want Your Lovin' (Just a Little Bit)".

A longtime sufferer of diabetes, Hairston died of related kidney failure at age 34 in Winston-Salem, North Carolina, in January 1996. He had attended both Winston-Salem State University and the Juilliard School of Music.

== Biography ==
Curtis Hairston was born in Winston-Salem, North Carolina on October 10, 1961. As a child, he performed in his local choir and by the age of 13, he wanted to pursue a career in music. After completing his education at the Juilliard School of Music, he signed to the Pretty Pearl record label, owned by basketball player Earl Monroe.

His debut single in 1983 was "I Want You (All Tonight)". The track proved moderately successful peaking at number 35 on the US Billboard Dance charts, and number 44 in the UK Singles Chart. In 1984, he did a cover version of Jimmy Cliff's "We All Are One", which became his first Billboard R&B chart hit, reaching number 72. Hairston had his first major hit in 1985 with "I Want Your Lovin' (Just a Little Bit)" which peaked at number 13 on the UK Charts. The success of the song led to an appearance on British music show Top of the Pops, and a music video was also made.

Hairston performed lead vocals on the majority of songs from the B. B. & Q. Band's 1985 album Genie. The album proved successful in the UK, with both the title track and "Dreamer" becoming top 40 hits.

In 1986, he left Pretty Pearl records and signed to the mainstream label, Atlantic Records. The same year he released first and only solo studio album. The single "Chillin' Out" peaked at number 57 in the UK charts. Hairston released his last solo single "The Morning After" in 1987. In 1990, Hairston collaborated with the jazz group Ready for Reality.

Hairston died on January 18, 1996, at North Carolina Baptist Hospital. His funeral service took place two days later at the First Baptist Church in Winston-Salem.

In 2012, Reverse Spin Music released a greatest hits album titled Celebrating Curtis Hairston. The compilation included some unreleased songs which he recorded before he died.

== Discography ==
=== Studio album ===
- Curtis Hairston (1986)

=== Compilation album ===
- Celebrating Curtis Hairston (2012)

=== Singles ===
Year	Single	Peak chart positions		
Year	Single	US R&B	US Dance	UK
1983	"I Want You (All Tonight)"	―	35	44
1983	"Summertime"	―	―	―
1984	"We All Are One"	72	―	―
1985	"I Want Your Lovin' (Just a Little Bit)"	76	48	13
1986	"Let's Make Love Tonight"	―	―	―
1986	"Take Charge"	―	―	―
1986	"Chillin' Out"	―	―	57
1987	"(You're My) Shining Star"	71	―	―
1987	"The Morning After"	―	―	80
"—" denotes releases that did not chart or were not released in that territory.
