= The Beat =

The Beat may refer to:

== Film and television ==
- The Beat (1987 film), an American drama starring William McNamara
- The Beat (2003 film), an American drama starring Jazsmin Lewis
- The Beat (TV series), a 2000s American drama series
- The Beat (Philippine TV program), a current affairs and talk program
- The !!!! Beat, a 1966 American music series.
- The Beat with Ari Melber, a news and politics show on MSNBC

== Music ==
- The Beat (British band), a British ska band, known in the United States as the English Beat and in Australia as the British Beat
- The Beat (American band), a power-pop band, later known as Paul Collins Beat
  - The Beat (American band album), their debut album
- The Beat (Boney James album), 2013 album by Boney James
- "The Beat", a song by Basshunter from his LOL <(^^,)> album
- "The Beat", a song by Elvis Costello from the album This Year's Model
- "The Beat", a song by Ima Robot from the album Monument to the Masses
- The Beat: Go-Go's Fusion of Funk and Hip-Hop, a 2001 compilation album

== Radio ==
- The Beat (Sirius), on Sirius Satellite Radio
- CFBT-FM, "The Beat 94.5", in Vancouver, British Columbia, Canada
- CKBT-FM, "91.5 The Beat", in Kitchener, Ontario, Canada
- KKBT, "100.3 The Beat", in Los Angeles, California, U.S.
- KZCE, "101.1 The Beat", in Phoenix, Arizona, U.S.
- WMIB, "103.5 The Beat", in Miami and Fort Lauderdale, Florida, U.S.
- WBTJ, "106.5 The Beat", in Richmond, Virginia, U.S.
- The Beat 99.9 FM, in Lagos, Nigeria

== Other media ==
- The Beat (magazine), a free crime-prevention magazine in London
- The Beat 102.7, a fictional radio station in the video game Grand Theft Auto IV
- Comics Beat, a comics magazine

== See also ==
- Beat (disambiguation)
