= Downbeat =

Downbeat, down beat or Down Beat may refer to:

- Downbeat and upbeat, the first and last beats, respectively, of a measure in music
- DownBeat, an American jazz magazine
- Downtempo or downbeat, a laid-back electronic music style similar to ambient music
- Down Beat, the NATO reporting name of the Leninets PN radar carried by the Russian/Soviet Tupolev Tu-22K and Tupolev Tu-22M bombers
- Downbeat Jazz Club, a jazz club in New York City
