= Nicolaas Beets =

Dutch theologian, writer and poet

Nicolas Beets
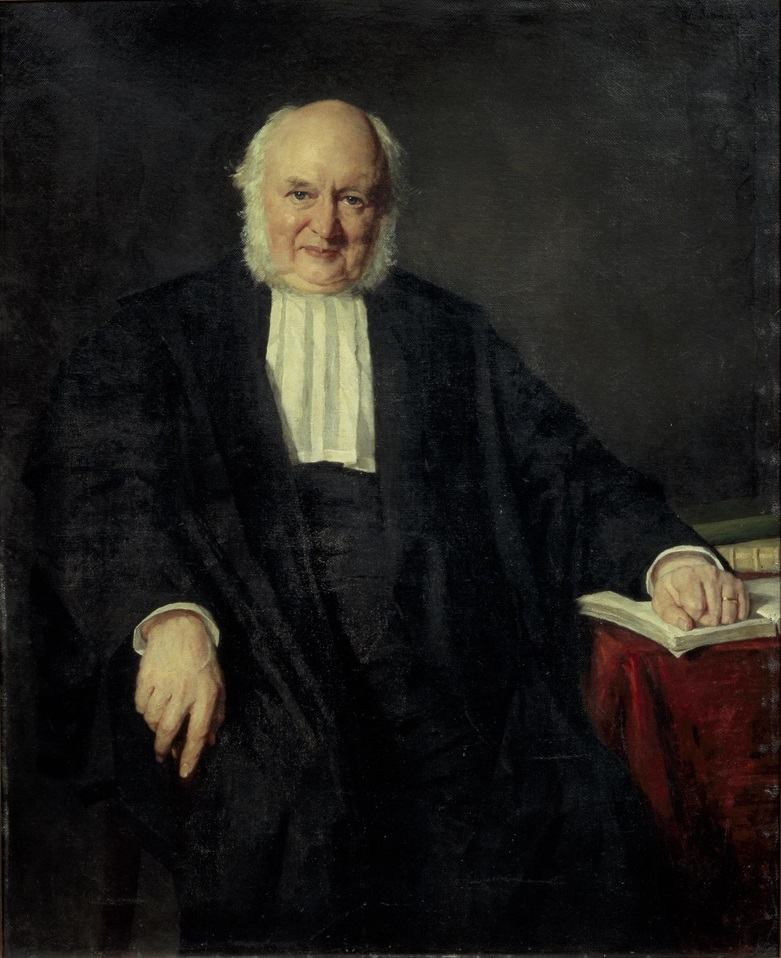
- Born: 13 September 1814; Haarlem, Netherlands
- Died: 13 March 1903 (aged 88); Utrecht, Netherlands
- Occupation: Protestant minister
- Writing career
- Pen name: Hildebrand
- Subject: Short autobiographical stories
- Notable work: Camera Obscura

Nicolaas Beets (13 September 1814 – 13 March 1903) was a Dutch theologian, writer and poet. He published also under the pseudonym Hildebrand.

== Life ==
Nicolaas Beets was born in Haarlem, the son of a pharmacist. From 1833 till 1839 he studied theology at the university of Leiden where he received his doctorate.

In 1840 he became a minister at the Dutch Reformed Church in Heemstede. In 1848 he became correspondent of the Royal Institute of the Netherlands, when that became the Royal Netherlands Academy of Arts and Sciences in 1851 he joined as member. In 1854 he moved to Utrecht where from 1874 till 1884 he was a professor in church history at the University of Utrecht.

He wrote prose, poetry and sermons. As a poet, Beets came under the influence of Byronism.

His most famous work is Camera Obscura, which he wrote under his pseudonym during his student years. Of his poems, "De moerbeitoppen ruischten" is well-known and popular; it is heavily anthologized, and even called "immortal" by one critic.

The archive of Nicolaas Beets is available at Leiden University Library and is digitally accessible.

== Personal life ==
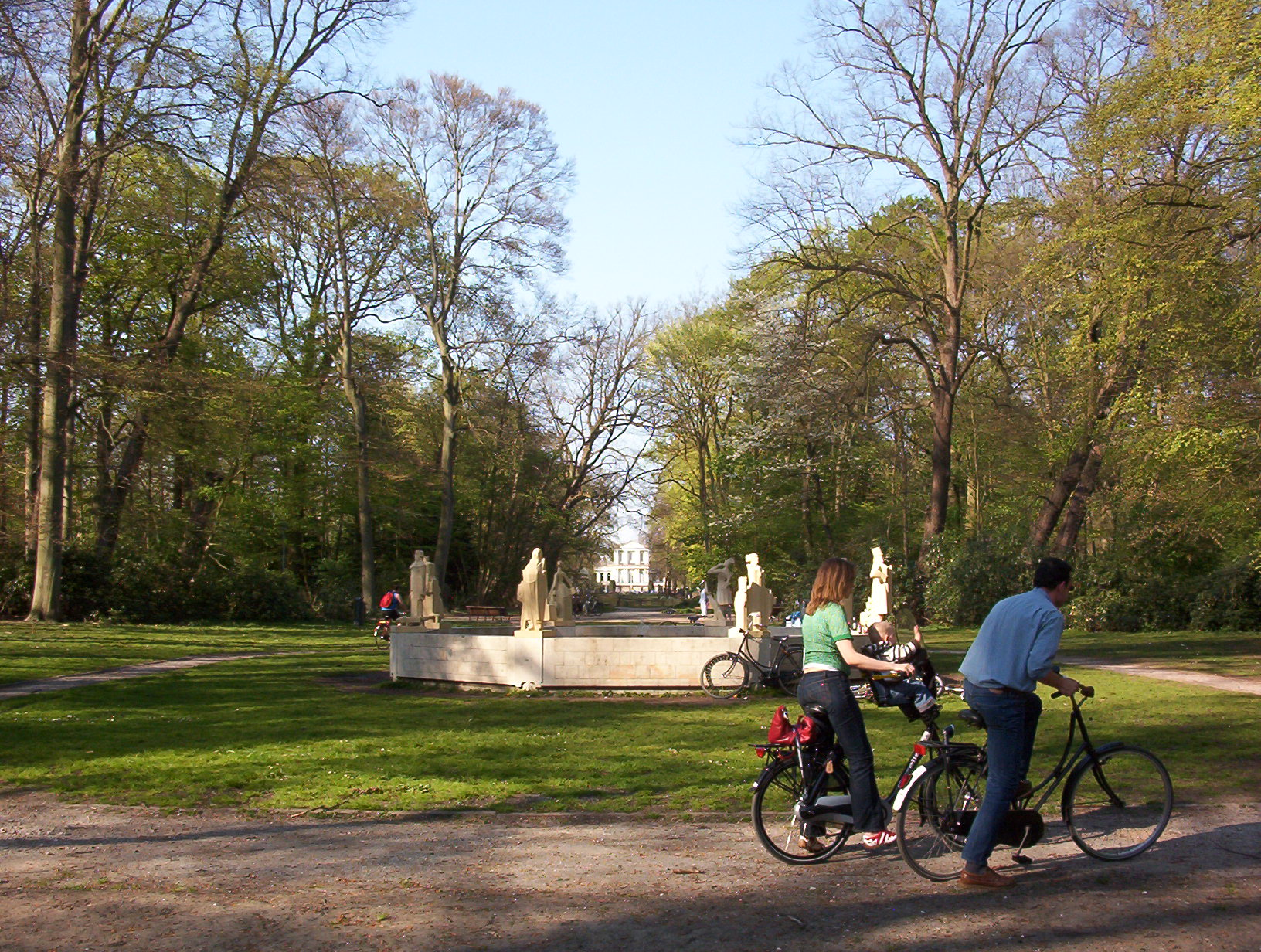
Hildebrand Monument in Haarlemmerhout, Haarlem, with characters from the Camera Obscura. Created by Jan Bonner in 1947 and placed in Haarlem in 1962

In 1840 he married Aleida van Foreest, granddaughter of Johannes Hendricus van der Palm, with whom he had 9 children. In 1859 he remarried with Jacoba Elisabeth, a sister of Aleida, with whom he had another 6 children. Beets had a sister, Dora Beets, who was also a writer.

Beets died of a brain haemorrhage at age 88, in Utrecht.
