= Sonja Beets =

Dutch musician, painter and poet

Sonja Beets (born 1953, Amsterdam) is a Dutch musician, composer, painter and poet who currently resides in France.

== Life and career ==
Sonja Beets was born in Amsterdam and studied music at the Amsterdam Conservatory, graduating in piano in 1978 and in organ in 1979. She later continued her studies with George van Renesse and Nelly Wagenaar and studied the Asian instrument sarangi with Joep Bor. She later also studied Celtic harp. She began work as a composer in 1987, and made her debut in 2000.

In 1997 Beets founded the arts organization Muzenstede where she currently serves as director. In 2000 she acted as producer for the project Muzikale Stadswandeling te Wijk bij Duurstede, which was a musical tour through the Netherlands. In 2000 she also founded the ensemble Purusha.

Beets lived and worked in Belgium from 2001 to 2007, and took up residence in France in 2007. Her works have been performed internationally.
