= Backbeat (biography) =

Backbeat: Earl Palmer's Story is the biography of pioneer rock and roll drummer Earl Palmer. The book is by music journalist Tony Scherman with a foreword by Wynton Marsalis. More than half the text is directly quoted from Palmer, making the book as much an autobiography as it is a biography.

The story begins with Palmer as a four-year-old vaudeville tap dancer and continues with the story of New Orleans music and the emergence of a strong rock and roll drumming style featuring the back beat. After his triumphs in the city, Palmer moved to Los Angeles, where he became one of the top session musicians and arrangers of the 1950s through the 1970s, playing on hundreds of hits, from "La Bamba" to Percy Faith and Frank Sinatra.

The sections quoting Palmer are colorful, frank, and direct, giving the full flavor of his life as a musician. For example, speaking of playing on Little Richard's records:

"Richard's music was exciting as a sumbitch. I'm not talking about the quality of it. It wasn't quality music. It wasn't no chords. It was just blues. "Slippin' and Slidin'" sounded like "Good Golly Miss Molly" and they both sounded like "Lucille". It was exciting because he was exciting. Richard is one of the few people I've ever recorded with that was just as exciting to watch in the studio as he was in performance."

The book includes an extensive discography and notes.
