= List of Kaiketsu Zorori episodes =

This is a list of episodes and movies of all anime adaptations of Kaiketsu Zorori.

== Kaiketsu Zorori ==
The first series, titled Kaiketsu Zorori, is primarily based on the children books by Yutaka Hara.

No.	Title	Based on	Original release date
1	"The Dragon Slayer"; Transliteration: "Doragon Taiji" (Japanese: ドラゴンたいじ)	Book 1	February 1, 2004
Zorori meets Ishishi and Noshishi and they plan a way for Zorori to marry Princess Elzie by stealing her away from Arthur using a dragon robot. Zorori tries to play the hero and save her, but the boars ruin it. Zorori decides to keep searching for a princess and Ishishi and Noshishi follow him as his new apprentices.
2	"Big Duel, Zorori Castle"; Transliteration: "Daikettō Zororijō" (Japanese: 大けっとうゾロリじょう)	Book 20	February 8, 2004
Zorori must battle against five rouges to free a princess and win her castle. He gets magical shrinking and growing medicine to help him, and in the end the castle is destroyed when Ishishi and Noshishi grow to enormous proportions. The rescued princess has been cursed to sleep as a frog. Zorori kisses her but storms away when nothing happens. A minute later the princess returns to normal and awakens.
3	"I Love Mama"; Transliteration: "Mama Dāisuki" (Japanese: ママだーいすき)	Book 9	February 15, 2004
Zorori is depressed on his deceased mother's birthday. When a fox mother loses her baby, Zorori promises to get him back. A sick Ishishi ends up taken away by an eagle and Zorori and Noshishi end up with the baby at the bottom of a ravine. They discover a huge treasure, but must leave it behind when Ishishi and the eagle come back to rescue them. The eagle crashes into the mother's home, but they arrive safely. Zorori gives the baby a giant diamond, the only piece of the treasure he brought along, to pay for a new home.
4	"The Mansion of Terror"; Transliteration: "Kyōfu no Yakata" (Japanese: きょうふのやかた)	Book 2	February 22, 2004
Zorori and the boars meet a group of monsters trying to be scary. They go to a nearby town to scare people, but are welcomed as entertainers. Zorori tries to show the monsters how to be scary by harnessing their abilities, but it all backfires. He builds a giant robot to scare the town with, but it goes haywire. They succeed in being thrown out of town and inciting fear.
5	"The Sacred Book"; Transliteration: "Seinaru Hon" (Japanese: せいなる本)	TBA	February 29, 2004
Zorori races against a millionaire to the top of a mountain to claim the Bukkura Koita, a book said to tell deeply moving stories. Zorori gets ownership over the book, only to find out it tells nothing but oyaji gags.
6	"The Wizard's Apprentice"; Transliteration: "Mahōtsukai no Deshi" (Japanese: まほうつかいのでし)	Book 3	March 7, 2004
An evil wizard has turned a local town's residents into household objects. Zorori decides to become the wizard's apprentice to use magic in his pranks. The wizard works them hard for a week and then Zorori discovers the wizard's power comes from his magic rod and he was never going to teach him magic. Outraged, Zorori steals the rod and starts using magic. The wizard takes back the rod and shrinks down Zorori to squish him. The boars take the rod and undo all the wizard's spells, revealing the wizard was actually a tanuki child all along.
7	"The Great Pirates"; Transliteration: "Daikaizoku" (Japanese: 大かいぞく)	Book 4	March 14, 2004
A drowning ship captain gives Zorori a golden parrot to give to his son Paru. The golden parrot has a treasure map. Zorori join's Paru's crew hoping to get buried treasure, but one of the pirates, Tiger, will do anything to get Zorori out of the way. He succeeds in shooting Zorori out of a cannon into the sea and reveals that he drowned the captain. Zorori comes back on a ship he transformed from a whale using the magic rod. Tiger steals the rod and wishes up a huge cannon that sinks his own ship. Zorori takes Paru to where the treasure is and they find a room filled with toy cars.
8	"Ghost Ship"; Transliteration: "Yūreisen" (Japanese: ゆうれいせん)	Book 5	March 21, 2004
Arthur and Elzie are on their honeymoon and Zorori tricks them onto his ship so he can get Arthur to sign away his castle. Arthur refuses no matter how hard Zorori tries to force him to sign. Just as Arthur agrees to sign, Noshishi accidentally unplugs the ship, turning it back into a whale.
9	"The Chocolate Castle"; Transliteration: "Chokorētojō" (Japanese: チョコレートじょう)	Book 6	March 28, 2004
Duke Bururu is holding a contest with a chocolate castle as the prize. Every chocolate bar is a winner, but the winning message is printed on the white chocolate that's in-between the dark and milk chocolate layers. To win someone would have to lick away both sides of the chocolate to reach the center. Zorori does just that and goes to claim his prize, only to be told he still has to complete an obstacle course to reach and win his castle. Zorori manages to win the castle and set it adrift, only to have it melt in a warmer southern climate.
10	"The Giant Dinosaur"; Transliteration: "Daikyōryū" (Japanese: 大きょうりゅう)	Book 7	April 4, 2004
A billboard advertises a real live dinosaur so Zorori and the boars go to see it. The dinosaur turns out to be a child and Zorori decides to capture his own dinosaur. They find one on a southern island and discover the dinosaur is a mother and figure out the dinosaur they saw was her kidnapped son. They all go back to where he is being held captive and free him.
11	"The Terrifying Car Race"; Transliteration: "Kyōfu no Kārēsu" (Japanese: きょうふのカーレース)	Book 21	April 11, 2004
Duke Bururu is having another contest, this time for a new car and a year's supply of ice cream. Zorori once again wins by sucking on an ice pop stick for two hours to reveal the winning message. But like last time, there's a catch. Zorori must win a miniature car race before he can get his prize. With the help of Paru who now owns a toy car parts shop, they modify their toy car to run on fart power. Zorori, Ishishi, Duke Bururu, and Koburu shrink down and race the cars, with Zorori as the winner. Bururu congratulates them and gives them their prize: Three cups of ice cream and a tricycle attached to a wagon with the image of the new car on a cardboard cut-out over it.
12	"The Terrifying Amusement Park"; Transliteration: "Kyōfu no Yūenchi" (Japanese: きょうふのゆうえんち)	Book 8	April 18, 2004
Zorori builds an amusement park to try to steal Elzie and Arthur's castle. The free day pass they received and signed states that at the end of the day, Zorori would get their castle. Arthur wants to rip it up, but Elzie wants to spend the day at the park. Zorori's attempts to steal the pass from them fail and when he does get it, he's hurled into the air on a firework that destroys the pass when it goes off.
13	"The Delicious School"; Transliteration: "Oishii Gakkō" (Japanese: おいしいがっこう)	TBA	April 25, 2004
Zorori and the boars are starving when Dracula comes by and tells them the Monster School Teacher is sick and Zorori is wanted as a substitute. Seeing this as his chance to get food, he agrees to sub. Despite making all the classes food oriented, he still doesn't get any food. Out of desperation he eats an entire room filled with garlic, leaving him with a terrible smell. The students give Zorori tons of food as a parting gift, but Zorori is too full from the garlic to eat it.
14	"The Mysterious Airplane"; Transliteration: "Nazo no Hikōki" (Japanese: なぞのひこうき)	Book 16	May 2, 2004
As Zorori plays with a toy plane, he remembers his father who left him and his mother years ago to pursue his dreams of flying the skies in a plane he built himself. An officer comes by and tells him the toy plane was stolen and the boars said they took it by mistake. They run from the police and end up on Money's plane, but partway through the flight the plane has engine trouble and crashes into a snowy mountain. Zorori builds a new plane from the remains and they fly off. They are low on gas when a red plane comes out of nowhere and points them to a nearby city. The red plane quickly vanishes and they get Money back home safely. Zorori is left wondering if the pilot was his father.
15	"The Giant Monster"; Transliteration: "Daikaijū" (Japanese: 大かいじゅう)	Book 10	May 9, 2004
Noshishi wins a lifetime supply of sweets and Zorori uses it to build a castle out of candy in the shape of a monster. Once the castle is done, a news report says a giant monster has appeared in the city, one who loves sweets. It heads toward Zorori's castle, and Zorori tries to stop him. All his plans fail and the monster destroys the castle. The monster starts to cry and Zorori realizes the monster is just a child who mistook the castle for his mother. Zorori wants to help him but Noshishi objects to the idea of taking care of a dinosaur, giving Zorori an idea. He takes the monster to the dinosaur mother and asks her to take care of him.
16	"A Decisive Battle! Cards VS Crayons"; Transliteration: "Kessen! Kādo Tai Kureyon" (Japanese: けっせん！カードたいクレヨン)	TBA	May 16, 2004
17	"Hanako's Ghost"; Transliteration: "Obake no Hanako-san" (Japanese: おばけの花子さん)	Book 14	May 23, 2004
18	"Terrifying Soccer"; Transliteration: "Kyōfu no Sakkā" (Japanese: きょうふのサッカー)	Book 14	May 30, 2004
19	"Arrested!!"; Transliteration: "Tsukamaru!!" (Japanese: つかまる!!)	Book 15	June 6, 2004
Zorori, Ishishi, and Noshishi arrive in a new town, where Zorori starts to play pranks on the town's citizens that is until a wanted poster comes out, framing him for stealing the town's prized golden statue. Angry at how the picture on the wanted poster looks nothing like him, Zorori sets out to create a new one and plasters the posters all over town but then the police catch up with him and to his shock, Zorori gets thrown in jail.
20	"The Great Escape"; Transliteration: "Daidassō" (Japanese: 大だっそう)	Book 15	June 13, 2004
21	"Ishishi & Noshishi's First Errand"; Transliteration: "Ishishi Noshihi no Hajimete no Otsukai" (Japanese: イシシノシシのはじめてのおつかい)	TBA	June 20, 2004
22	"The Great Rocket Plan"; Transliteration: "Roketto Daisakusen" (Japanese: ロケット大さくせん)	Book 11	June 27, 2004
23	"The Mysterious Aliens"; Transliteration: "Nazo no Uchūjin" (Japanese: なぞのうちゅうじん)	Book 11	July 4, 2004
24	"Zorori's Dream Castle"; Transliteration: "Yume no Zororijō" (Japanese: ゆめのゾロリじょう)	TBA	July 11, 2004
25	"A Fiance Appears!?"; Transliteration: "Fianse Arawaru!?" (Japanese: フィアンセあらわる!?)	Book 13	July 18, 2004
26	"The Great Riddle Plan"; Transliteration: "Nazo Nazo Daisakusen" (Japanese: なぞなぞ大さくせん)	Book 13	July 25, 2004
27	"The Great Ghost Plan"; Transliteration: "Obake Daisakusen" (Japanese: おばけ大さくせん)	Book 17	August 1, 2004
28	"The Great Giant Monster Plan"; Transliteration: "Oonyūdō Daisakusen" (Japanese: 大にゅうどう大さくせん)	Book 17	August 8, 2004
29	"The Great Oyaji Gag Plan"; Transliteration: "Oyaji Gyagu Daisakusen" (Japanese: おやじギャグ大さくせん)	TBA	August 15, 2004
30	"The Monster Major Leagues"; Transliteration: "Yōkai Dai Rīgu" (Japanese: ようかい大リーグ)	Book 33	August 22, 2004
31	"The Terrifying Magic Ball"; Transliteration: "Kyōfu no Makyū" (Japanese: きょうふのまきゅう)	Book 33	August 29, 2004
32	"A Home Run Vow"; Transliteration: "Chikai no Hōmu Ran" (Japanese: ちかいのホームラン)	Book 33	September 5, 2004
33	"The Bottom of the Sea Zorori Castle"; Transliteration: "Kaitei Zororijō" (Japanese: かいていゾロリじょう)	TBA	September 12, 2004
34	"The Great Treasure Card Plan"; Transliteration: "Otakara Kādo Daisakusen" (Japanese: おたからカード大さくせん)	Book 18	September 26, 2004
35	"The Great Ninja Plan"; Transliteration: "Ninja Daisakusen" (Japanese: にんじゃ大さくせん)	Book 18	October 3, 2004
36	"Clash! The Great Mecha Ishishi & Noshishi Plan"; Transliteration: "Gekitotsu! Meka Ishishi Noshihi Daisakusen" (Japanese: げきとつ! メカイシシノシシ大さくせん)	TBA	October 10, 2004
37	"A Shocking Marriage Proposal"; Transliteration: "Dokkiri Puropōsu" (Japanese: どっきりプロポーズ)	Book 19	October 17, 2004
38	"Marry!?"; Transliteration: "Kekkon Suru!?" (Japanese: けっこんする!?)	Book 19	October 24, 2004
39	"The Great Part Time Job Plan"; Transliteration: "Arubaito Daisakusen" (Japanese: アルバイト大さくせん)	Book 23	October 31, 2004
40	"A Rich Man"; Transliteration: "Oganemochi" (Japanese: 大金もち)	Book 23	November 7, 2004
41	"The Close Call Princess"; Transliteration: "Ōjosama Kikiippatsu" (Japanese: 王女さま ききいっぱつ)	Book 24	November 14, 2004
42	"The Close Call Video Game"; Transliteration: "Terebi Gēmu Kikiippatsu" (Japanese: テレビゲームききいっぱつ)	Book 24	November 21, 2004
43	"The Great Monster Squid Elimination Plan"; Transliteration: "Obake Ika Taiji Daisakusen" (Japanese: おばけイカたいじ大さくせん)	TBA	November 28, 2004
44	"The Great Terrifying Jump"; Transliteration: "Kyōfu no Dai Janpu" (Japanese: きょうふの大ジャンプ)	Book 22	December 5, 2004
45	"The Great Gold Medal Plan"; Transliteration: "Kin Medaru Daisakusen" (Japanese: 金メダル大さくせん)	Book 22	December 12, 2004
46	"The Terrifying Presents"; Transliteration: "Kyōfu no Purezento" (Japanese: きょうふのプレゼント)	Book 12	December 19, 2004
47	"Play-off! The Dream Prince"; Transliteration: "Kessen! Yume no Ōjisama" (Japanese: けっせん！ゆめの王子さま)	TBA	December 26, 2004
48	"The Terrifying Devil"; Transliteration: "Kyōfu no Akuma" (Japanese: きょうふのあくま)	Book 31	January 9, 2005
49	"Heaven and Hell"; Transliteration: "Tengoku to Jigoku" (Japanese: てんごくとじごく)	Book 31	January 16, 2005
50	"A Trip to Hell"; Transliteration: "Jigoku Ryokō" (Japanese: じごくりょこう)	Book 32	January 23, 2005
51	"Zorori's Final Day!?"; Transliteration: "Zorori Saigo no Hi!?" (Japanese: ゾロリさいごの日!?)	Book 32	January 30, 2005
52	"The Sky Flying Zorori Castle"; Transliteration: "Sora Tobu Zororijō" (Japanese: そらとぶゾロリじょう)	TBA	February 6, 2005

== Majime ni Fumajime Kaiketsu Zorori ==
=== Season 1 ===
The second series, titled Majime ni Fumajime Kaiketsu Zorori (まじめにふまじめ かいけつゾロリ), differs from the first series in a few ways. It adopts fewer of Hara's books and instead focuses on a season long story arc, something the first series did not have. Season 1 focuses on the wizard Nelly and the mysterious Najō as Zorori, Ishishi, and Noshishi help them restore the magic forest in a magical country.

No.	Title	Based on	Original release date
1	"The Great Cheer Up Plan"; Transliteration: "Genki Morimori Daisakusen" (Japanese: げんきもりもり大さくせん)	TBA	February 13, 2005
2	"The Mystery of the Giant Cave"; Transliteration: "Kyōdai Dokutsu no Nazo" (Japanese: きょだいどうくつのなぞ)	Book 25	February 20, 2005
3	"The Terrifying Treasure Hunt"; Transliteration: "Kyōfu no Takara Sagashi" (Japanese: きょうふのたからさがし)	Book 25	February 27, 2005
4	"The Mysterious Magical Girl"; Transliteration: "Nazo no Mahō Shōjo" (Japanese: なぞのまほう少女)	Book 34	March 6, 2005
5	"The 3 Heroes"; Transliteration: "Sannin no Yūsha" (Japanese: 3人のゆうしゃ)	Book 34	March 13, 2005
6	"The Wizard's Traps"; Transliteration: "Mahōtsukai no Wana" (Japanese: まほうつかいのわな)	Book 35	March 20, 2005
7	"The Magic Room"; Transliteration: "Mahō no Heya" (Japanese: まほうのへや)	Book 35	March 27, 2005
8	"The Power of Magic"; Transliteration: "Mahō no Chikara" (Japanese: まほうのちから)	Book 35	April 3, 2005
9	"Let's Go to the Hot Springs"; Transliteration: "Onsen he Ikō" (Japanese: おんせんへ行こう)	Book 27	April 10, 2005
10	"The Detective Has Appeared"; Transliteration: "Meitantei Tōjō" (Japanese: めいたんていとうじょう)	Book 27	April 17, 2005
11	"Nelly's Mistake"; Transliteration: "Nerī-chan no Shippai" (Japanese: ネリーちゃんのしっぱい)	TBA	April 24, 2005
12	"A Bunch of Riddles"; Transliteration: "Nazonazo ga Ippai" (Japanese: なぞなぞがいっぱい)	TBA	May 1, 2005
13	"The Ramen King Appears"; Transliteration: "Rāmen Ō Tōjō" (Japanese: ラーメン王とうじょう)	Book 30	May 8, 2005
14	"It's hot! A Ramen Showdown"; Transliteration: "Atsui ze! Rāmen Taiketsu" (Japanese: あついぜ！ラーメンたいけつ)	Book 30	May 15, 2005
15	"The Terrifying Popular Designer"; Transliteration: "Kyofu no Motemote Dezainā" (Japanese: きょうふのモテモテデザイナー)	TBA	May 22, 2005
16	"The Flap to the World Designer"; Transliteration: "Sekai he Habatake Dezainā" (Japanese: 世界へはばたけデザイナー)	TBA	May 29, 2005
17	"The Great Carnival Plan"; Transliteration: "Kānibaru Daisakusen" (Japanese: カーニバルだいさくせん)	Book 29	June 5, 2005
18	"Keep Watch! Carnival Victory"; Transliteration: "Mesase! Yūshō Kānibaru" (Japanese: めざせ！ゆうしょうカーニバル)	Book 29	June 12, 2005
19	"The Terrifying Carnival"; Transliteration: "Kyōfu no Kānibaru" (Japanese: きょうふのカーニバル)	Book 29	July 3, 2005
20	"The Magic Forest"; Transliteration: "Mahō no Mori" (Japanese: まほうのもり)	TBA	July 10, 2005
21	"The Tail Walking Fishes"; Transliteration: "Oppo de Aruku Sakanatachi" (Japanese: おっぽであるくさかなたち)	TBA	July 17, 2005
22	"The Great Prankster Kids Plan"; Transliteration: "Itazura Kozō Daisakusen" (Japanese: いたずらこぞう大さくせん)	TBA	July 24, 2005
23	"Climb! Terrifying Mt. Tongari"; Transliteration: "Nobore! Kyofu no Tongari Yama" (Japanese: のぼれ！きょうふのトンガリ山)	TBA	July 31, 2005
24	"The Cursed Valley"; Transliteration: "Noroi no Tani" (Japanese: のろいの谷)	TBA	August 7, 2005
25	"The Curse of the Haunted House"; Transliteration: "Obakeyashiki no Noroi" (Japanese: おばけやしきののろい)	TBA	August 14, 2005
26	"The Monsters Have Come"; Transliteration: "Yōkaitachi ga Yattekita" (Japanese: ようかいたちがやってきた)	TBA	August 21, 2005
27	"Zorori Can Be Eaten"; Transliteration: "Zorori Taberareru" (Japanese: ゾロリたべられる)	Book 36	August 28, 2005
28	"The Great Escape from Tonma"; Transliteration: "Tonma kara no Dai Dasshutsu" (Japanese: とんまからの大だっしゅつ)	Book 36	September 4, 2005
29	"The Dragon Farm Duel"; Transliteration: "Doragon Bokujō no Kettō" (Japanese: ドラゴンぼくじょうのけっとう)	TBA	September 11, 2005
30	"Zorori VS Gaon"; Transliteration: "Zorori VS Gaon" (Japanese: ゾロリVSガオン)	TBA	September 18, 2005
31	"Ishishi & Noshishi's 100 Close Calls"; Transliteration: "Ishishi Noshishi Kikihyakupatsu" (Japanese: イシシ・ノシシきき100ぱつ)	TBA	September 25, 2005
32	"The Great Curry Panic"; Transliteration: "Karē Dai Panikku" (Japanese: カレー大パニック)	TBA	October 2, 2005
33	"The Mysterious Giant Good Luck Cat"; Transliteration: "Nazo no Oomaneki Neko" (Japanese: なぞの大まねきねこ)	TBA	October 9, 2005
34	"The Terrifying Farting Squirrel Adventure"; Transliteration: "Kyōfu no Hetorisu Adobenchā" (Japanese: きょうふのへとリス・アドベンチャー)	TBA	October 16, 2005
35	"The Fated 8 Hours"; Transliteration: "Unmei no Hachijikan" (Japanese: うんめいの8じかん)	Book 28	October 23, 2005
36	"Certain Death"; Transliteration: "Zettai Zetsumei" (Japanese: ぜったいぜつめい)	Book 28	October 30, 2005
37	"The Terrifying Flower Monster"; Transliteration: "Kyōfu no Furawā Monsutā" (Japanese: きょうふのフラワーモンスター)	TBA	November 6, 2005
38	"Bridegroom Training"; Transliteration: "Hanamuko Shugyō" (Japanese: はなむこしゅぎょう)	TBA	November 13, 2005
39	"Who's the Culprit!?"; Transliteration: "Hannin wa Dare da!?" (Japanese: はんにんはだれだ！？)	TBA	November 20, 2005
40	"The Secret of Dapon's Pharmacy"; Transliteration: "Dapon Yakkyoku no Himitsu" (Japanese: ダボンやっきょくのひみつ)	TBA	November 27, 2005
41	"Rescue Nelly!"; Transliteration: "Nerī-chan wo Sukue" (Japanese: ネリーちゃんをすくえ！)	TBA	December 4, 2005
42	"The Great Thief"; Transliteration: "Ōdorobō" (Japanese: 大どろぼう)	Book 37	December 11, 2005
43	"Pursue Guramo!"; Transliteration: "Guramo wo Oe!" (Japanese: グラモをおえ！)	Book 37	December 18, 2005
44	"Dapon's Great Revenge Plan"; Transliteration: "Dapon no Fukushū Daisakusen" (Japanese: ダボンのふくしゅう大さくせん)	TBA	December 25, 2005
45	"Dapon's Meditation Hot Spring"; Transliteration: "Dapon no Hansei Onsen" (Japanese: ダボンのはんせいおんせん)	TBA	January 8, 2006
46	"Giant Monster Dapon"; Transliteration: "Daikaijū Dapon" (Japanese: 大かいじゅうダボン)	TBA	January 15, 2006
47	"The Great Dapon Rescue Plan"; Transliteration: "Dapon Kyūshutsu Daisakusen" (Japanese: ダボンきゅうしゅつ大さくせん)	TBA	January 22, 2006
48	"The Terrifying Great Meteorite"; Transliteration: "Kyōfu no Ooinseki" (Japanese: きょうふの大いんせき)	Book 26	January 29, 2006
49	"Search for the Fart Masters"; Transliteration: "Onara meijin wo sagase" (Japanese: おならめいじんをさがせ)	Book 26	February 5, 2006
50	"The Earth's Final Day"; Transliteration: "Chikyū Saigo no Hi" (Japanese: ちきゅうさいごの日)	Book 26	February 12, 2006

=== Season 2 ===
Season 2 of Majime ni Fumajime Kaiketsu Zorori focuses on Puppe's search for the Minus Eel and Zorori's battle with The Legendary Prank King. Unlike the first season, this season is composed of original stories rather than adapting Yutaka Hara's books.

No.	Title	Based on	Original release date
1	"The Ghost Forest's Electric Eel"; Transliteration: "Obake no Mori no Denki Unagi" (Japanese: おばけの森のデンキウナギ)	TBA	February 19, 2006
2	"Blow Down the Piglet's House!"; Transliteration: "Kobuta no uchi wo Buttobase!" (Japanese: 子ブタの家をぶっとばせ!)	TBA	February 26, 2006
3	"Zorori Has Become a Child!?"; Transliteration: "Zorori Kodomo ni Naru!?" (Japanese: ゾロリ子どもになる!?)	TBA	March 5, 2006
4	"No Smiling Allowed in Nikoniko Town"; Transliteration: "Waraccha Damedame Nikoniko Taun" (Japanese: 笑っちゃだめだめニコニコタウン)	TBA	March 12, 2006
5	"Zorori and Cinderella"; Transliteration: "Zorori to Shindarera" (Japanese: ゾロリとシンデレラ)	TBA	March 19, 2006
6	"The Prince of Fate"; Transliteration: "Unmei no Ōjisama" (Japanese: うんめいの王子さま)	TBA	March 26, 2006
7	"Pursuing the Super Baby"; Transliteration: "Sūpaa Akachan Daitsuiseki" (Japanese: スーパー赤ちゃん大ついせき)	TBA	April 2, 2006
8	"The Great Get a Princess Plan"; Transliteration: "Ohimesama Getto Daisakusen" (Japanese: おひめさまゲット大さくせん)	TBA	April 9, 2006
9	"Zorori, the Devil King, and the Prince"; Transliteration: "Zorori to Maou to Ōjisama" (Japanese: ゾロリとまおうと王子さま)	TBA	April 16, 2006
10	"Rescue Princess Myan!"; Transliteration: "Myan Ōjo wo Sukue!" (Japanese: ミャン王女をすくえ!)	TBA	April 23, 2006
11	"Aryaps' Puppe"; Transliteration: "Aryapusu no Puppe" (Japanese: アリャプスのプッペ)	TBA	April 30, 2006
12	"Showdown at Mt. Kachimake"; Transliteration: "Kachimake Yama no Taiketsu" (Japanese: カチマケ山のたいけつ)	TBA	May 7, 2006
13	"The Great Storm Escape"; Transliteration: "Arashi kara no Daidasshutsu" (Japanese: あらしからの大だっしゅつ)	TBA	May 14, 2006
14	"Let's Get the Diamond!"; Transliteration: "Daiya wo Te ni Irero!" (Japanese: ダイヤを手にいれろ!)	TBA	May 21, 2006
15	"Zorori Lost His Memory!?"; Transliteration: "Zorori Kiokusōshitsu!?" (Japanese: ゾロリきおくそうしつ!?)	TBA	May 28, 2006
16	"Showdown! Little Red Ridding Hood"; Transliteration: "Taiketsu! Akazukin-chan" (Japanese: たいけつ！赤ずきんちゃん)	TBA	June 4, 2006
17	"Mecha Gaon Appears!"; Transliteration: "Meka Gaon Arawaru!" (Japanese: メカガオンあらわる!)	TBA	June 11, 2006
18	"Startlingly Surprised?! The Golf Tournament"; Transliteration: "Dokkiri Bikkuri?! Gorufu Taikai" (Japanese: どっきりびっくり?!ゴルフたいかい)	TBA	June 25, 2006
19	"The Great Zorori Circus"; Transliteration: "Zorori Dai Saakasu" (Japanese: ゾロリ大サーカス)	TBA	July 9, 2006
20	"The Terrifying Capsule Machine"; Transliteration: "Kyōfu no Gachagacha" (Japanese: きょうふのガチャガチャ)	TBA	July 16, 2006
21	"Destroying the Weather Machine"; Transliteration: "Otenki Mashin wo Buttsubuse" (Japanese: お天気マシンをぶっつぶせ)	TBA	July 23, 2006
22	"Puppe's Secret"; Transliteration: "Puppe no Himitsu" (Japanese: プッペのひみつ)	TBA	July 30, 2006
23	"Showdown! The Legendary Prank King"; Transliteration: "Taiketsu! Densetsu no Itazura Ō" (Japanese: たいけつ!でんせつのイタズラ王)	TBA	August 6, 2006
24	"Goodbye! Puppe"; Transliteration: "Sayonara! Puppe" (Japanese: さよなら!プッペ)	TBA	August 13, 2006
25	"Tracking the Prank King"; Transliteration: "Itazura Ō Daitsuiseki" (Japanese: イタズラ王大ついせき)	TBA	August 20, 2006
26	"Thank you Mr. Sankyū"; Transliteration: "Sankyū-san Arigatō" (Japanese: サンキューさんありがとう)	TBA	August 27, 2006
27	"The Great Rescue Zorori Plan"; Transliteration: "Zorori Kyūshutsu Daisakusen" (Japanese: ゾロリきゅうしゅつ大さくせん)	TBA	September 3, 2006
28	"The Close Call Runaway Locomotive"; Transliteration: "Bōsō Kikansha Kikiippatsu" (Japanese: ぼうそうきかんしゃききいっぱつ)	TBA	September 10, 2006
29	"Showdown! Kids VS Adults"; Transliteration: "Taiketsu! Kodomo VS Otona" (Japanese: たいけつ!こどもVSおとな)	TBA	September 17, 2006
30	"Zorori and Gaon's Terrifying 97 Matches"; Transliteration: "Zorori to Gaon Kyōfu no 97 Narabe" (Japanese: ゾロリとガオンきょうふの97ならべ)	TBA	September 24, 2006
31	"The Certain Kill Pranksters"; Transliteration: "Hissatsu Itazurajin" (Japanese: ひっさつイタズラ人)	TBA	October 1, 2006
32	"The Terrifying Marathon Rally"; Transliteration: "Kyōfu no Marason Taikai" (Japanese: きょうふのマラソンたいかい)	TBA	October 8, 2006
33	"Ishishi and Noshishi's Candy Hell"; Transliteration: "Ishishi Noshishi no Okashi Jigoku" (Japanese: イシシ・ノシシのおかしじごく)	TBA	October 15, 2006
34	"Save Princess Elzie's Castle!"; Transliteration: "Eruze Hime no Oshiro wo Sukue!" (Japanese: エルゼひめのおしろをすくえ!)	TBA	October 22, 2006
35	"The Mysterious Magic Words are Honchara Konchara"; Transliteration: "Nazo no Jumon wa Honchara Kanchara" (Japanese: なぞのじゅもんはホンチャラカンチャラ)	TBA	October 29, 2006
36	"Puppe is God?"; Transliteration: "Puppe ga Kamisama?" (Japanese: プッペがかみさま?)	TBA	November 5, 2006
37	"The Big Prize is a Terrifying Premonition!?"; Transliteration: "Kyōfu no Uranai Ōatari?" (Japanese: きょうふのうらない大あたり!?)	TBA	November 12, 2006
38	"Greetings! Mysterious Alien!"; Transliteration: "Saitōjō! Nazo no Uchūjin!" (Japanese: さいとうじょう!なぞのうちゅうじん!)	TBA	November 19, 2006
39	"Eh! Zorori's Little Sister?"; Transliteration: "Eh! Zorori no Imōto?" (Japanese: えっ！ゾロリのいもうと?)	TBA	November 26, 2006
40	"Surprise! The Great Kick the Can Plan"; Transliteration: "Bikkuri! Kankeri Daisakusen!" (Japanese: びっくり!カンけり大さくせん!)	TBA	December 3, 2006
41	"Look! A Super Hero"; Transliteration: "Mezase! Sūpaa hīrō" (Japanese: めざせ!スーパーヒーロー)	TBA	December 10, 2006
42	"The Princess' Ghost"; Transliteration: "Yūrei no Ohimesama" (Japanese: ゆうれいのおひめさま)	TBA	December 17, 2006
43	"An Alien is Santa Claus"; Transliteration: "Uchūjin wa Santa Kurōsu" (Japanese: うちゅうじんはサンタクロース)	TBA	December 24, 2006
44	"The Great Gift of the New Year's First Smile Plan"; Transliteration: "Hatsuwarai Otoshidama Daisakusen" (Japanese: はつわらい おとしだま大さくせん)	TBA	January 7, 2007
45	"The Out of Control Robot Maid"; Transliteration: "Meido Robotto Daibōsō" (Japanese: メイドロボット大ぼうそう)	TBA	January 14, 2007
46	"The Prank King and the Mysterious Castle"; Transliteration: "Itazura Ō to Nazo no Shiro" (Japanese: イタズラ王となぞのしろ)	TBA	January 21, 2007
47	"The Final Decisive Battle! The Legendary Prank King"; Transliteration: "Iyoiyo Kessen! Densetsu no Itazura Ō" (Japanese: いよいよけっせん!でんせつのイタズラ王)	TBA	January 28, 2007

== Motto! Majime ni Fumajime Kaiketsu Zorori ==
=== Season 1 ===
In July 2019, it was announced that a new television anime series of Kaiketsu Zorori would be released in early 2020. The anime is the first television anime adaptation of the book series in 13 years since the second anime ended in 2007. In February 2020, it was announced to debut on April 5 on NHK E.

The series, titled Motto! Majime ni Fumajime Kaiketsu Zorori, is a joint collaboration between Bandai Namco Pictures and Ajiado. Takahide Ogata served as director, Atsuhiro Tomioka handled the series' composition, Hideyuki Funakoshi served as character designer, and Kōhei Tanaka composed the music. Kōichi Yamadera performs the opening theme song "Motto! Motto! Kaiketsu Zorori" as Zorori, and ONEPIXCEL performs the ending theme "Shalalala."

Yamadera, Rikako Aikawa, and Motoko Kumai reprised their respective roles. This series marks the debut of Zorori's rival, Beat (voiced by Yūki Kaji).

From May 10 to June 28 of 2020, the show was on hiatus due to the COVID-19 pandemic. New episodes resumed on July 5, 2020, starting with its seventh episode, and ended on November 8, 2020.

No.	Title	Based on	Original release date
1	"A Bride and Zorori Castle"; Transliteration: "Hanayome to Zororijō" (Japanese: はなよめとゾロリじょう)	Book 50	April 5, 2020
2	"Zorori vs the Hot-Blooded Beat"; Transliteration: "Zorori VS Nekketsu no Beat" (Japanese: ゾロリVSねっけつのビート)	TBA	April 12, 2020
3	"Curry vs ESP"; Transliteration: "Karē VS Chōnōryoku" (Japanese: カレーVSちょうのうりょく)	Book 43	April 19, 2020
4	"Kaiketsu Zorori in The Quiz King"; Transliteration: "Kaiketsu Zorori no Kuizu Ō" (Japanese: かいけつゾロリのクイズ王)	Book 56	April 26, 2020
5	"The Mysterious Spy and Chocolate"; Transliteration: "Nazo no Supai to Chokorēto" (Japanese: なぞのスパイとチョコレート)	Book 52	May 3, 2020
6	"Secret Weapons and a Soul Mate"; Transliteration: "Himitsu Heiki to Unmei no Hito" (Japanese: ひみつへいきとうんめいの人)	Book 52	May 10, 2020
7	"Zorori, Beat, and the Girl Who Makes Flowers Bloom"; Transliteration: "Zorori to Beat to Hanasaka Musume" (Japanese: ゾロリとビートと花咲かむすめ)	TBA	July 5, 2020 (Note: This episode was originally scheduled to air on May 17, 2020, but did not due to the production shutdown.)
8	"Magic Lamp~oon"; Transliteration: "Mahō no Ranpu～～～" (Japanese: まほうのランプ～～～っ)	Book 54	July 12, 2020
9	"Zorori in a Pinch! Find the Great Genie!"; Transliteration: "Zorori Pinchi! Daimajin wo Sagase!" (Japanese: ゾロリピンチ！大まじんをさがせ！)	Book 55	July 19, 2020
10	"The Mysterious Spy and 100 Roses"; Transliteration: "Nazo no Supai to 100-pon no Bara" (Japanese: なぞのスパイと１００本のバラ)	Book 53	July 26, 2020
11	"Search for Garuru Kingdom's Treasure Chest!"; Transliteration: "Garuru Ōkoku no Takarabako wo Sagase!" (Japanese: ガルル王国のたからばこをさがせ！)	TBA	August 2, 2020
12	"How to Become a Prince"; Transliteration: "Ōjisama ni Naru Hōhō" (Japanese: 王子さまになるほうほう)	Book 60	August 9, 2020
13	"Challenge from a Princess!"; Transliteration: "Ohimesama Kara no Chōsen!" (Japanese: お姫さまからのちょうせん！)	Book 60	August 16, 2020
14	"Zorori and the Takoyaki Love"; Transliteration: "Zorori to Takoyaki no Koi" (Japanese: ゾロリとたこやきの恋)	TBA	August 23, 2020
15	"Zorori Channel"; Transliteration: "Zorori Channeru" (Japanese: ゾロリちゃんねる)	Book 49	August 30, 2020
16	"The Terrifying Monster Field Trip"; Transliteration: "Kyōfu no Yōkai Ensoku" (Japanese: きょうふのようかいえんそく)	Book 46	September 6, 2020
17	"Zorori's Surprising Engagement!"; Transliteration: "Zorori no Kon'yaku Ottamagerorin!" (Japanese: ゾロリのこんやくオッタマゲロリン！)	TBA	September 13, 2020
18	"Ishishi and Noshishi Are in a Big Pinch!"; Transliteration: "Ishishi, Noshishi Dai Pinchi!" (Japanese: イシシ・ノシシ大ピンチ！)	Book 44	September 20, 2020
19	"Roaring Car Race!"; Transliteration: "Bakusō Kārēsu!" (Japanese: ばくそうカーレース！)	TBA	September 27, 2020
20	"Mysterious Ghost Ship"; Transliteration: "Nazo no Yūreisen" (Japanese: なぞのゆうれいせん)	TBA	October 4, 2020
21	"Horror! The Town Where Doorknobs Disappeared!?"; Transliteration: "Kyōfu! Doanobu ga Kieta Machi!?" (Japanese: きょうふ！ドアノブがきえたまち！？)	TBA	October 11, 2020
22	"The Great Robot Plan"; Transliteration: "Robotto Daisakusen" (Japanese: ロボット大さくせん)	Book 64	October 18, 2020
23	"Fly! Gundapoot"; Transliteration: "Tobe! Gandabū" (Japanese: とべ！ガンダブー)	Book 64	October 25, 2020
24	"The Great Outer Space Plan"; Transliteration: "Uchū Daisakusen" (Japanese: うちゅう大さくせん)	Book 65	November 1, 2020
25	"The Greatest Rescue Mission in History!"; Transliteration: "Shijō Saidai no Resukyū!" (Japanese: しじょう最大のレスキュー！)	Book 65	November 8, 2020

=== Season 2 ===
In November 2020, it was announced that a second season of Motto! Majime ni Fumajime Kaiketsu Zorori would be released in April 2021. In February 2021, it was announced to debut on April 2 on NHK E, with airing day moved from Sunday to Friday evening. On July 14, 2021, it was announced episodes will be postponed due to coverage of the 2021 Tokyo Summer Games.

No.	Title	Based on	Original release date
1	"The Great Mecha Mecha Plan"; Transliteration: "Meka Meka Daisakusen" (Japanese: メカメカ大さくせん)	Book 51	April 2, 2021
2	"The Terrifying Beat Camp"; Transliteration: "Kyōfu no Beat Kyanpu" (Japanese: きょうふのビートキャンプ)	TBA	April 9, 2021
3	"When It Rains, It Pours"; Transliteration: "Kiken'na Amayadori" (Japanese: きけんな雨やどり)	TBA	April 16, 2021
4	"A Sweet!? Stamp Rally"; Transliteration: "Okashi!? na Sutanpu Rarī" (Japanese: おかし！？なスタンプラリー)	TBA	April 23, 2021
5	"The Great Help Yulia Plan"; Transliteration: "Yuria Otasuke Daisakusen" (Japanese: ユリアおたすけ大さくせん)	TBA	April 30, 2021
6	"Beat's House of All Trades!?"; Transliteration: "Beat no Nandemo Yashiki!?" (Japanese: ビートのなんでもやしき！？)	TBA	May 7, 2021
7	"Zorori Hot Springs"; Transliteration: "Zorori Onsen" (Japanese: ゾロリおんせん)	TBA	May 14, 2021
8	"The Great Party Plan"; Transliteration: "Pātī Daisakusen" (Japanese: パーティー大さくせん)	TBA	May 21, 2021
9	"The Prank King vs The Prank Emperor"; Transliteration: "Itazura Ō VS Itazura Teiō" (Japanese: いたずら王VSいたずら帝王)	TBA	May 28, 2021
10	"Ishishi's Great Great Great Fortune!"; Transliteration: "Ishishi no Dai Dai Dai Kyōun!" (Japanese: イシシの大大大強運！)	TBA	June 4, 2021
11	"A Strange Showdown in the Sweets Country"; Transliteration: "Okashi no Kuni no Okashi na Taiketsu" (Japanese: おかしの国のおかしな対決)	TBA	June 11, 2021
12	"The Great Monster Sports Day"; Transliteration: "Yōkai Dai Undōkai" (Japanese: ようかい大うんどうかい)	TBA	June 18, 2021
13	"The Dragon and the Young Prince"; Transliteration: "Doragon to Wakaki Ōji" (Japanese: ドラゴンと若き王子)	Book 63	June 25, 2021
14	"The Terrifying Dodgeball"; Transliteration: "Kyōfu no Dojjibōru" (Japanese: きょうふのドッジボール)	TBA	July 2, 2021
15	"Suppoko Peppoko Peculiar Story"; Transliteration: "Suppoko Peppoko Henteko Banashi" (Japanese: スッポコペッポコへんてこ話)	'Ishishi to Noshishi no Suppoko Peppoko Henteko Banashi: Ōborāra Danshaku no Daibōken' (イシシとノシシのスッポコペッポコへんてこ話 オーボラーラ男爵の大冒険) book	July 9, 2021
16	"A Great Duo!? Zorori and Gaon"; Transliteration: "Meikonbi!? Zorori to Gaon" (Japanese: 名コンビ！？ゾロリとガオン)	TBA	July 16, 2021
17	"The Ghost and the Promised Treasure"; Transliteration: "Yūrei to Yakusoku no Hihō" (Japanese: ゆうれいとやくそくの秘宝)	TBA	July 23, 2021
18	"A Sly Devil and the Wondrous Book"; Transliteration: "Zurukko Akuma to Fushigi na Hon" (Japanese: ずるっこあくまとふしぎな本)	TBA	August 13, 2021
19	"Zorori's Deep Sea Adventure!"; Transliteration: "Zorori no Kaitei Tanken!" (Japanese: ゾロリのかいていたんけん！)	Book 61	September 10, 2021
20	"Zorori's Journey to the Center of the Earth!"; Transliteration: "Zorori no Chitei Tanken!" (Japanese: ゾロリのちていたんけん！)	Book 62	September 17, 2021
21	"The Monarch Who Battles With Cards!"; Transliteration: "Kādo de Batoru de Ōsama da!" (Japanese: カードでバトルで王様だ！)	TBA	September 24, 2021
22	"Kaiketsu! Zoro-salaryman"; Transliteration: "Kaiketsu! Zororīman" (Japanese: かいけつ！ゾロリーマン)	TBA	October 1, 2021
23	"Find It! The Golden Flower"; Transliteration: "Sagase! Ōgon no Hana" (Japanese: さがせ！おうごんの花)	TBA	October 8, 2021
24	"Zorori Finally Debuts as a Singer!?"; Transliteration: "Zorori, Tsuini Kashu Debyū!?" (Japanese: ゾロリ、ついに歌手デビュー！？)	TBA	October 15, 2021
25	"Farewell, Zorori!"; Transliteration: "Saraba, Zorori!" (Japanese: さらば、ゾロリ！)	TBA	October 22, 2021

=== Season 3 ===
On October 22, 2021, it was announced that a third season of Motto! Majime ni Fumajime Kaiketsu Zorori would be released in April 2022. On February 9, 2022, it was announced to debut on April 6 on NHK E, with airing day moved from Friday to Wednesday evening.

No.	Title	Based on	Original release date
1	"The Terrifying Super Express"; Transliteration: "Kyōfu no Chōtokkyū" (Japanese: きょうふのちょうとっきゅう)	Book 45	April 6, 2022
2	"Drive, Zorori! Showdown With Rose"; Transliteration: "Hashire Zorori! Taiketsu Rōzu" (Japanese: はしれゾロリ！たいけつローズ)	TBA	April 13, 2022
3	"Make a Fortune by Traveling!?"; Transliteration: "Tabi Suru Dake de Ōmōke!?" (Japanese: 旅するだけで大もうけ！？)	TBA	April 20, 2022
4	"Delicious Gold Medal"; Transliteration: "Oishii Kin Medaru" (Japanese: おいしい金メダル)	Book 59	April 27, 2022
5	"The Insect Kingdom and the Mystery of the Dung Beetle"; Transliteration: "Mushi Ōkoku to Funkorogashi no Nazo" (Japanese: ムシ王国とフンコロガシの謎)	TBA	May 4, 2022
6	"Zoroe Saw It!"; Transliteration: "Zoroe wa, Mita!" (Japanese: ゾロエは、見た！)	TBA	May 11, 2022
7	"My Boyfriend is Zorori!"; Transliteration: "Bōifurendo wa Zorori!" (Japanese: ボーイフレンドはゾロリ！)	TBA	May 18, 2022
8	"The Terrifying Aliens"; Transliteration: "Kyōfu no Eirian" (Japanese: きょうふのエイリアン)	Book 68	May 25, 2022
9	"Zorori and the Sky Blue Dress"; Transliteration: "Zorori to Sorairo Doresu" (Japanese: ゾロリと空色ドレス)	TBA	June 1, 2022
10	"Zorori and the Giant Egg!"; Transliteration: "Zorori to Ōkina Tamago!" (Japanese: ゾロリと大きなタマゴ！)	TBA	June 8, 2022
11	"The Great Villain Zorori Plan"; Transliteration: "Akutō Zorori Daisakusen" (Japanese: あくとうゾロリ大さくせん)	TBA	June 15, 2022
12	"Let's Eat! The Great Food Reportage Battle"; Transliteration: "Taberuze! Shokuripo Daikessen" (Japanese: たべるぜ！食リポ大けっせん)	Book 41	June 22, 2022
13	"Find the Red Diamond!!"; Transliteration: "Reddo Daiya wo Sagase!!" (Japanese: レッドダイヤをさがせ！！)	Book 67	June 29, 2022
14	"Zorori vs Gaon vs Mama?"; Transliteration: "Zorori Tai Gaon Tai Mama?" (Japanese: ゾロリ対ガオン対ママ？)	TBA	July 6, 2022
15	"Why!? Beat's Tears"; Transliteration: "Dōshite!? Bīto no Namida" (Japanese: どうして！？ビートの涙)	TBA	July 13, 2022
16	"The Great Diet Plan"; Transliteration: "Daietto Daisakusen" (Japanese: ダイエット大さくせん)	Book 42	July 20, 2022
17	"The Mysterious Ishi Noshi Cipher"; Transliteration: "Nazo no Angō Ishi・Noshi" (Japanese: なぞのあんごう イシ・ノシ)	TBA	July 27, 2022
18	"Zorori and the Scary Things Club"; Transliteration: "Zorori to Kowaimono Kurabu" (Japanese: ゾロリとこわいものクラブ)	TBA	August 3, 2022
19	"Zorori vs Gaon vs Beat"; Transliteration: "Zorori Tai Gaon Tai Bīto" (Japanese: ゾロリ対ガオン対ビート)	TBA	August 10, 2022
20	"Zorori and the Sealed Candy"; Transliteration: "Zorori to Fūin no Ame" (Japanese: ゾロリとふういんのアメ)	TBA	August 17, 2022
21	"The Nonsense TV Channel"; Transliteration: "Hachamecha Terebi Kyoku" (Japanese: はちゃめちゃテレビ局)	Book 49	August 24, 2022
22	"Zorori and the Two Adventurers"; Transliteration: "Zorori to Futari no Bōkenka" (Japanese: ゾロリとふたりのぼうけんか)	TBA	August 31, 2022
23	"The First Gift"; Transliteration: "Hajimete no Okurimono" (Japanese: はじめてのおくりもの)	TBA	September 7, 2022
24	"Inventors Showdown! Piggy-banking On It"; Transliteration: "Hatsumei Taiketsu! Chokin wa V" (Japanese: はつめい対決！チョキンはV)	TBA	September 14, 2022
25	"Chase the Red Plane!"; Transliteration: "Akai Hikōki wo Oe!" (Japanese: あかいひこうきをおえ！)	TBA	September 21, 2022

== Movies ==
=== Tokyo Movie Shinsha ===
Title	Based on	Original release date
"Kaiketsu Zorori: The Wizard's Apprentice/The Great Pirates' Treasure Hunt" Transliteration: "Kaiketsu Zorori: Mahōtsukai no Deshi / Daikaizoku no Takara Sagashi" (Japanese: かいけつゾロリ:まほう使いのでし/大かいぞくの宝さがし)	Books 3 and 4	1993
It was shown alongside Soreike! Anpanman: Nosshi the Dinosaur's Big Adventure (それいけ!アンパンマン 恐竜ノッシーの大冒険, Soreike Anpanman Kyōryū Nosshii no Daibōken).

=== Ajia-do Animation Works ===
Title	Based on	Original release date
"Quest for the Mysterious Treasure" Transliteration: "Nazo no Otakara Daisakusen" (Japanese: なぞのお宝大さくせん)	Books 38 and 39	2006
Zorori, Ishishi and Noshishi provide help to Tail on a quest to find the treasure her father Gale died trying to investigate. Along the way, they are helped out by Yōkai-sensei and several monsters, but Tiger and his pirate crew stand in their way. This film was shown alongside Keroro Gunsō the Super Movie on March 11, 2006.
"G-g-g-great Adventure!" Transliteration: "Da-da-da-daibōken!" (Japanese: だ・だ・だ・だいぼうけん!)	Books 47 and 48	TBA
Zorori, Ishishi and Noshishi, while out searching for treasure, come upon a town with a widespread illness. In order to make the secret medicine for it, they must set out on an adventure. This is the first full-length Zorori movie.
"Will Protect It! The Dinosaur Egg" Transliteration: "Mamoru ze! Kyōryū no Tamago" (Japanese: まもるぜ! きょうりゅうのたまご)	Book 40	TBA
Zorori, Ishishi and Noshishi receive an invitation from their friend, a mother dinosaur, to come see a dinosaur egg that will hatch soon. The group receives a warm welcome when they arrive at the legendary dinosaur island. However, a huge typhoon hits the island and the egg goes missing. Zorori goes on a quest to save the egg and return it safely to its family.
"The Space Heroes" Transliteration: "Uchū no Yūsha-tachi" (Japanese: うちゅうの勇者たち)	TBA	TBA
Zorori, Ishishi and Noshishi search for a meteor that sunk in the ocean. When under attack by octopuses, Zorori accidentally launches his submarine into space and land on another planet.
"The Secret of Double Z" Transliteration: "ZZ no Himitsu" (Japanese: ZZのひみつ)	TBA	TBA
Zorori, Ishishi and Noshishi travel back in time and meet young Zororeene.
"La La La♪ A Star is Born" Transliteration: "La La La♪ Sutā Tanjō" (Japanese: ラララ♪スターたんじょう)	Book 66	TBA
Zorori, Ishishi and Noshishi become agents and producers of a promising but troubled singer named Hippopo and help her on her way to stardom.
