= Big beat (disambiguation) =

Big beat is an electronic music genre.

Big beat may also refer to:

- Big beat, in the 1950s, later to be known as beat music
- Big-beat (Eastern Bloc), a name for rock and roll and relative genres in Central Europe in 1960s
- Big Beat (film), a 1993 Czech musical comedy film
- Big Beat (album), by Sparks, 1976
- Big Beat Records (British record label), specializing in garage rock
- Big Beat Records (American record label), specializing in electronic and dance music
- Big Beat from Badsville, an album by the Cramps, 1997
- "The Big Big Beat", a 2016 single by Azealia Banks

== See also ==
- The Big Beat (disambiguation)
