= On the Beat! =

Studio album by The KBC
- Released: 10 January 2007 (Japan)
- Recorded: 2006
- Genre: Indie
- Length: 42:41
- Label: High Voltage Sounds
- Producer: Damian Taylor, John Fortis, Tom Rixton, Lewis O'Brien

Professional ratings
Review scores
Source	Rating
Clickmusic.com	3/5 stars
Gigwise.com	4/5 stars

On the Beat! is the debut album by British indie band, The KBC. The album was released 10 January 2007 via Japanese label Fabtone Records.

== Track listing ==
1. "Poisonous Emblem" – 3:45
2. "Not Anymore" – 2:54
3. "Trippin" – 3:51
4. "Test the Water" – 3:56
5. "Day of Disillusion" – 3:45
6. "Busy Hands" – 3:41
7. "Pride Before the Fall" – 4:01
8. "Sherlock Groove Holmes" – 4:00
9. "Zeitgeist" – 3:58
10. "Best in the Business" – 3:46
11. "Mad With Me" – 5:00

Three tracks are available only on the Japanese release of the album:

- "You Are The Sign" – 4:52
- "Divide The Rule" – 3:51
- "Steven Get Even" – 3:42
