= George Beet =

George Beet may refer to:

- George Beet (cricketer, born 1886) (1886–1946), Derbyshire cricketer, wicket-keeper
- George Beet (cricketer, born 1904) (1904–1949), Derbyshire cricketer, his son
