= Beatdown (video game) =

1999 video game

- Developer: Soar Software
- Publisher: Hot-B
- Platform: Microsoft Windows
- Release: NA: April 1999
- Genre: Strategy video game
- Modes: Single player, multiplayer

Beatdown is a strategy video game developed by Soar Software and published by Hot-B in 1999.

== Reception ==
Reception

Aggregate score
Aggregator	Score
GameRankings	32%

Review scores
Publication	Score
Computer Gaming World	1/5
GameSpot	3.8/10
PC Accelerator	4/10
PC Gamer (US)	11%

The game received unfavorable reviews according to the review aggregation website GameRankings.
