= Eno Beats =

Music producer (b. 1991)

- Born: Enock Kisakye; 26 April 1991 (age 35); Uganda
- Occupation: Music producer
- Years active: 2015–present
- Website: www.enobeatsstudios.com

Enoch Kisakye (born April 26, 1991), better known as Producer Eno Beats, is a Ugandan music producer.

== Career ==
He is the Chief executive officer at Eno Beats Production Limited located in Makindye, Kampala. His studio is a well-known hub for audio and video production, mastering, and mixing. Eno Beats has worked with most of Uganda's top musicians including Bebe Cool, DR Jose Chameleone, Sheebah Karungi, Eddy Kenzo, among others. He was nominated in the All Africa Music Awards 2018 as Best Audio Producer and he won the HIPIPO MUSIC AWARDS as Audio Producer of the Year 2018. He produced Stani Tonkema and Wankona by Sheebah Karungi, Tatizo by Chameleone, and Katono by Bebe Cool.

== Awards ==
- 2018 HIPIPO MUSIC AWARDS: Audio Producer of the Year

== See also ==
- Paddyman
- Lumix Da Don
