= Beat It (disambiguation) =

"Beat It" is a 1983 song by Michael Jackson.

Beat It may also refer to:

== Music ==
- "Beat It" (Sean Kingston song), 2013
- "Beat It", 1967 song by Tony Cole
- "Beat It", 1980 song by Klaus Klang
- "Beat It", 2024 song by Future and Metro Boomin

== Other ==
- Beat It (film), a 1918 American short comedy film featuring Harold Lloyd
- Beat It!, a 2009 video game

== See also ==
- "Eat It", a 1984 parody song by "Weird Al" Yankovic
- Beat It Up (disambiguation)
