= The B. B. & Q. Band =

The Brooklyn Bronx & Queens Band

Studio album by B. B. & Q. Band
- Released: August 1981
- Studio: Fonoprint Studios (guitars, keyboards, bass, drums), Mediasound Studios (vocals)
- Genre: R&B; funk
- Length: 35:14
- Label: Capitol
- Producer: Jacques Fred Petrus

B. B. & Q. Band chronology
The Brooklyn Bronx & Queens Band (1981)	All Night Long (1982)

Professional ratings
Review scores
Source	Rating
AllMusic	3/5 stars

The Brooklyn Bronx & Queens Band is the debut album by the funk/R&B band B. B. & Q. Band, produced by band creator Jacques Fred Petrus. Its lead single, "On The Beat", was their best known hit song.

== Track listing ==
1. "On the Beat"
2. "Time for Love"
3. "Don't Say Goodbye"
4. "Starlette"
5. "Mistakes"
6. "Lovin's What We Should Do"
7. "I'll Cut You Loose"

== Personnel ==
- Bass - Paris Ford (credited as Peewee Ford)
- Drums - Terry Silverlight
- Guitar - Paolo Gianolio
- Piano and synthesizers - Mauro Malavasi
- Keyboards - Kevin Nance
- Vocals - Ike Floyd
