= Dora Beets =

Dutch writer

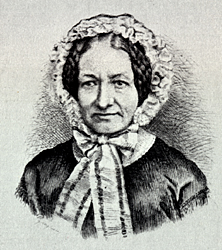
- Born: Dorothea Petronella Beets; 13 April 1812; Haarlem, Zuyderzée, French Empire
- Died: 16 April 1864 (aged 52); Haarlem, North Holland, Netherlands
- Occupation: author
- Spouse: Pieter François Bohn (1800–1873)
- Relatives: Martinus Nicolaas Beets (father); Maria Elisabeth de Waal Malefijt (mother)
- Writing career
- Notable work: Onze buurt

Dora Beets (13 April 1812 – 16 April 1864) was a Dutch writer. She was the sister of Nicolaas Beets, who called her Serena in his works.

== Life ==
=== Provenance and early years ===
Dorothea "Dora" Petronella Beets was born in Haarlem where Martinus Nicolaas Beets, her father, was an apothecary and her upbringing reflected her parents' adherence to the mainstream Protestant Dutch Reformed Church. She was the eldest of her parents' seven children, and continued to live with her parents at their home in the Koningstraat ("King Street") till she married the book dealer and publisher Pieter François Bohn in Haarlem on 6 July 1835: she took the name Dorothea Petronella Bohn-Beets. Dora was twelve years younger than her husband who was a Mennonite. The couple moved into the corner house where Pieter Bohn conducted his business, in the city centre at the point where Grote Houtstraat crosses one side of the Verwulft (square). The marriage would produce at least eight children of whom two sons and two daughters are known to have reached adulthood. The fact that Beets came from the Reformed Church tradition while her husband came from the minority Mennonite community seems not to have been a problem. Intriguingly, as each of the children's births was registered with the city hall, their stated religious affiliations alternated. Only with the birth registrations for the youngest two children was the pattern broken: François en Martinus were both registered as Mennonites.

=== Onze buurt ===
Her book Onze buurt ("Our neighborhood") was published anonymously in 1861. Indeed, the term used, "een ongenoemde" ("an unnamed [author]") applied the male version of the definite article, implying that the unnamed author was a man. The anonymity also meant that the uninformed reader had no reason to know that the author was an elder sibling of Nicolaas Beets, a theologian and popular poet who was already well known in Haarlem as a published author, despite publishing his works under the pseudonym "Hildebrand".

Only after Dora's death, when the second edition appeared in 1870, did the book incorporate an introduction by Nicolaas Beets in which he disclosed that the author, Dorothea Bohn-Beets, had been his sister. The book's publication received little press coverage, but it was nevertheless reasonably popular with readers. A sixth edition was published in 1911.

In 2002 a new edition was published, using modern (post 1995) spelling.

The book provides a striking description of daily life among the 19th century haute bourgeoisie. The setting is clearly Haarlem (though the city is identified merely as "X") during the 1860s. The family of the main protagonist, Mrs. Rueel, is not identical to that of Dorothea Bohn, but it nevertheless becomes apparent from studying her private correspondence that many of the experiences and happenings related in the book correspond to real-life events in the author's own life. In February 1862 Dora Beets wrote her brother a letter in which she confided how "... in that book I have set out the innermost outpourings of my own heart in all their variety, and all sorts of mouths have given voice to my own beliefs and confessions". (Note: "in dat boek heb ik, onder allerlei vormen, het innigste van mijn hart gelegd, en allerlei monden en stemmen hebben mijn geloofsbelijdenis uitgesproken!")

In Onze buurt, Dorothea Bohn-Beets describes mid-nineteenth century city life with its relatively fixed hierarchical structure, the houses of the upper and lower middle-classes and the charitable undertakings by citizens and their wives seeking to alleviate the screaming poverty in the city. She also focuses on the differences within and between church congregations, between traditionalist and "modern" versions of Protestantism. The author hints at her own position through the views and actions of her lead protagonist, who champions an evangelical Christianity. It is nevertheless striking that Roman Catholics, who were certainly present in Haarlem in significant numbers at that time, seem not to exist in the city of "X". A further recurring theme involves feeding people: Mrs. Rueel feeds not merely her three children but also, where necessary, all the neighbours. She is an exceptionally successful provider of sustenance. This is clearly a characteristic that the author uses to idealise her heroine despite the context of a setting that is in other respects realistic. A commentator explains that without some sort of didactic idealisation, a Dutch novel of this period could not exist, because it would carry no useful message. Usefulness, in literature, was very important.
