= Cash Cash discography =

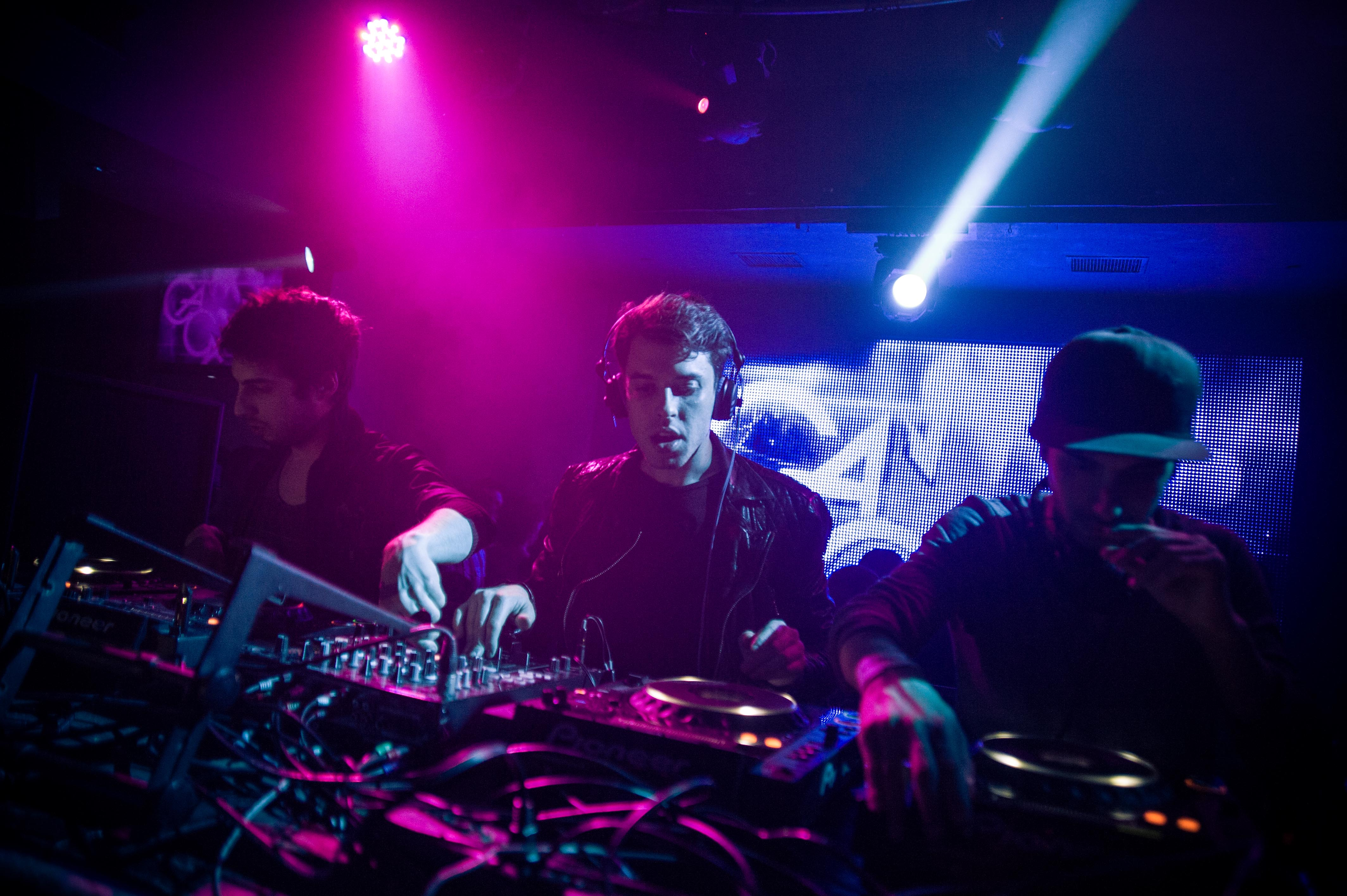
- Cash Cash performing at the Club Sutra
- Studio albums: 5
- EPs: 3
- Compilation albums: 1
- Singles: 39
- Music videos: 12

The discography of American DJ trio Cash Cash consists of five studio album, three extended plays and 36 singles. Their debut album, Take It to the Floor was released on December 23, 2008 and peaked at No. 31 on the Billboard Heatseekers Albums chart. Their second studio album, Love or Lust was released on April 19, 2011 and peaked at No. 169 on the Japanese Albums chart. Their third studio album, The Beat Goes On was released on September 7, 2012 and peaked at No. 163 on the Japanese Albums chart. Their fourth studio album, Blood, Sweat & 3 Years was released on June 24, 2016 peaking at No. 125 on the Billboard 200 and is certified platinum in South Korea. Their fifth studio album, Say It Like You Feel It was released on May 14, 2021.

Their hit single "Take Me Home" was released on July 15, 2013. The song peaked at No. 57 on the Billboard Hot 100 and sold 488,000 digital downloads. In 2016, the group released a single called, "Millionaire", collaborating with British DJ Digital Farm Animals and features American rapper Nelly for the song. In 2019, the group were featured in Pink's song "Can We Pretend". The song peaked at No. 1 on the Billboard Dance Club Songs chart.

== Albums ==
=== Studio albums ===
List of studio albums, with selected chart positions and certifications
Title	Details	Peak chart positions						
Title	Details	US	US Dance	US Heat	AUS	CAN	JPN	TWN
Take It to the Floor	Released: December 23, 2008; Label: Universal Republic; Format: Digital download, CD	—	—	31	—	—	—	—
Love or Lust	Released: April 19, 2011; Label: Cash Cash, Twilight (Japan only); Format: Digital download, CD	—	—	—	—	—	169	—
The Beat Goes On	Released: September 7, 2012; Label: Cash Cash, Twilight (Japan only); Format: Digital download, CD	—	—	—	—	—	163	—
Blood, Sweat & 3 Years	Released: June 24, 2016; Label: Big Beat, Atlantic; Format: Digital download, CD	125	3	5	— (Note: Blood, Sweat & 3 Years did not enter the ARIA Albums Chart, but peaked at number 18 on the ARIA Hitseekers Albums Chart.)	97	— (Note: Blood, Sweat & 3 Years did not enter the Oricon Albums Chart, but peaked at number 76 on the Billboard Japan Hot Albums chart.)	6
Say It Like You Feel It	Released: May 14, 2021; Label: Big Beat, Atlantic; Format: Digital download, CD	—	—	—	—	—	— (Note: Say It Like You Feel It did not enter the Oricon Albums Chart, but peaked at number 88 on the Billboard Japan Download Albums chart.)	—
"—" denotes a recording that did not chart or was not released in that territory.

=== Compilation albums ===
List of compilation albums
Title	Album details
Acoustic Collection (Vol. 1)	Released: October 29, 2021; Label: Big Beat, Atlantic; Format: DL

== Extended plays ==
List of extended plays, with selected chart positions and sales figures
Title	Details	Peak chart positions		Sales
Title	Details	US Dance	US Heat	Sales
Cash Cash	Released: October 7, 2008; Label: Universal Republic; Format: Digital download, CD	—	24	US: 5,000
Overtime	Released: October 29, 2013; Label: Big Beat, Atlantic; Format: Digital download	11	30	
Lightning	Released: March 24, 2014; Label: Big Beat, Atlantic; Format: Digital download	—	—	
"—" denotes a recording that did not chart or was not released in that territory.

== Singles ==
List of singles as lead artist, with selected chart positions, sales figures and certifications
Title	Year	Peak chart positions										Certifications	Album
Title	Year	US	US Dance	AUS	BEL (WA)	CAN	KOR	NLD	NZ	SCO	UK	Certifications	Album
"Party In Your Bedroom"	2009	—	—	—	—	—	—	—	—	—	—		Take It To The Floor
"Everytime We Touch"	2009	—	—	—	—	—	—	—	—	—	—		Non-album singles
"Forever Young"	2010	—	— (Note: "Forever Young" did not enter the Billboard Dance/Electronic Songs chart, but peaked at number 34 on the Dance/Electronic Digital Song Sales chart.)	—	—	—	—	—	—	—	—		Non-album singles
"Red Cup (I Fly Solo)" (featuring Lacey Schwimmer and Spose)	2010	—	—	—	—	—	—	—	—	—	—		Non-album singles
"Victim of Love"	2011	—	—	—	—	—	—	—	—	—	—		Love or Lust
"Sexin' on the Dance Floor" (featuring Jeffree Star)	2011	—	—	—	—	—	—	—	—	—	—		Love or Lust
"Michael Jackson (The Beat Goes On)"	2012	—	—	—	— (Note: "Michael Jackson (The Beat Goes On)" did not enter the Ultratop 50, but peaked at number 28 on the Ultratip chart.)	—	—	25	—	—	—		The Beat Goes On
"I Like It Loud"	2012	—	—	—	—	—	—	—	—	—	—		The Beat Goes On
"Overtime"	2012	—	39	—	—	—	—	—	—	—	—		Overtime
"Take Me Home" (featuring Bebe Rexha)	2013	57	6	7	— (Note: "Take Me Home" did not enter the Ultratop 50, but peaked at number 22 on the Ultratip chart.)	52	182	—	28	2	5	RIAA: Platinum; ARIA: Platinum; MC: Gold; BPI: Gold	Overtime and Blood, Sweat & 3 Years
"Lightning" (featuring John Rzeznik)	2014	—	39	—	—	—	—	—	—	—	—		Blood, Sweat & 3 Years
"Surrender"	2014	—	19	—	—	—	99	—	—	—	—		Blood, Sweat & 3 Years
"Untouchable" (with Tritonal)	2015	—	27	—	—	—	—	—	—	—	—		Non-album single
"Devil" (featuring Busta Rhymes, B.o.B and Neon Hitch)	2015	—	28	—	—	—	90	—	—	—	—		Blood, Sweat & 3 Years
"Escarole"	2015	—	—	—	—	—	—	—	—	—	—		Blood, Sweat & 3 Years
"Aftershock" (featuring Jacquie Lee)	2016	—	— (Note: "Aftershock" did not enter the Billboard Dance/Electronic Songs chart, but peaked at number 34 on the Dance/Mix Show Airplay chart.)	—	—	—	83	—	—	—	—		Blood, Sweat & 3 Years
"How to Love" (featuring Sofia Reyes)	2016	—	16	—	—	—	24	—	—	—	—		Blood, Sweat & 3 Years
"Millionaire" (with Digital Farm Animals featuring Nelly)	2016	—	22	63	— (Note: "Millionaire" did not enter the Ultratop 50, but peaked at number 33 on the Ultratip chart.)	—	—	46	— (Note: "Millionaire" did not enter the New Zealand Top 40 chart, but peaked at number 10 on the New Zealand Heatseekers chart.)	20	25	ARIA: Gold; BPI: Gold	Blood, Sweat & 3 Years
"Broken Drum" (featuring Fitz of Fitz and the Tantrums)	2016	—	44	—	—	—	—	—	—	—	—		Blood, Sweat & 3 Years
"Matches" (with Rozes)	2017	—	38	—	—	—	—	—	—	—	—		Say It Like You Feel It
"All My Love" (featuring Conor Maynard)	2017	—	23	—	— (Note: "All My Love" did not enter the Ultratop 50, but charted as an "extra tip" on the Ultratip chart.)	—	—	—	—	—	—		Say It Like You Feel It
"Belong" (with Dashboard Confessional)	2017	—	—	—	—	—	—	—	—	—	—		Say It Like You Feel It
"Jewel" (featuring Nikki Vianna)	2018	—	35	—	—	—	—	—	—	—	—		Say It Like You Feel It
"Finest Hour" (featuring Abir)	2018	—	14	—	—	—	—	—	—	—	—	RIAA: Gold	Say It Like You Feel It
"Call You" (featuring Nasri of Magic!)	2018	—	— (Note: "Call You" did not enter the Billboard Dance/Electronic Songs chart, but peaked at number eight on the Dance/Mix Show Airplay chart.)	—	—	—	—	—	—	—	—		Say It Like You Feel It
"Can We Pretend" (with Pink)	2019	— (Note: "Can We Pretend" did not enter the Billboard Hot 100 chart, but peaked at number 31 on the Digital Song Sales chart.)	1	99	48	99	—	33	— (Note: "Can We Pretend" did not enter the New Zealand Top 40 chart, but peaked at number 14 on the New Zealand Hot Singles chart.)	30	88	ARIA: Platinum; BPI: Silver; MC: Gold; RMNZ: Gold	Hurts 2B Human
"Mean It" (featuring Wrabel)	2020	—	— (Note: "Mean It" did not enter the Billboard Dance/Electronic Songs chart, but peaked at number four on the Dance/Mix Show Airplay chart.)	—	—	—	—	—	—	—	—		Say It Like You Feel It
"I Found You" (with Andy Grammer)	2020	—	—	—	—	—	—	—	—	—	—		Non-album single
"Gasoline" (featuring Laura White)	2020	—	36	—	—	—	—	—	—	—	—		Say It Like You Feel It
"Love You Now" (featuring Georgia Ku)	2020	—	45	—	—	—	—	—	—	—	—		Say It Like You Feel It
"Too Late" (featuring Wiz Khalifa and Lukas Graham)	2021	—	14	—	—	—	—	—	—	—	—		Say It Like You Feel It
"Ride or Die" (featuring Phoebe Ryan)	2021	—	29	—	—	—	—	—	—	—	—		Say It Like You Feel It
"Anyway" (featuring RuthAnne)	2023	—	— (Note: "Anyway" did not enter the Billboard Dance/Electronic Songs chart, but peaked at number two on the Dance/Mix Show Airplay chart.)	—	—	—	—	—	—	—	—		TBA
"Bleach (Move On)"	2023	—	—	—	—	—	—	—	—	—	—		TBA
"Tell It to My Heart" (with Taylor Dayne)	2023	—	32	—	—	—	—	—	—	—	—		TBA
"New Madonna" (featuring Bryce Vine)	2024	—	—	—	—	—	—	—	—	—	—		TBA
"Smile" (with DVBBS featuring Quinn XCII)	2024	—	—	—	—	—	—	—	—	—	—		TBA
"When I Got You" (featuring lovelytheband)	2025	—	—	—	—	—	—	—	—	—	—		TBA
"Honest" (featuring KYLE)	2025	—	—	—	—	—	—	—	—	—	—		TBA
"Up So High" (featuring Rozes)	2025	—	—	—	—	—	—	—	—	—	—		TBA
"Sadness" (with Hayley Kiyoko)	2025	—	—	—	—	—	—	—	—	—	—		TBA
"—" denotes a recording that did not chart or was not released in that territory.

== Other charted songs ==
List of songs, with selected chart positions
Title	Year	Peak chart positions	Album
Title	Year	US Dance	Album
"42" (featuring J.Lauryn)	2021	41	Say It Like You Feel It
"—" denotes a recording that did not chart or was not released in that territory.

== Music videos ==
Title	Year	Director(s)	Ref.
"Party In Your Bedroom"	2009	Brendan Kyle Cochrane	
"Forever Young"	2010	Chain Reaction Media	
"Take Me Home" (featuring Bebe Rexha)	2014	DJ Brawner	
"Surrender"	2015	Roy Rez	
"Aftershock" (featuring Jacquie Lee)	2016	Cash Cash & Phil Botti	
"How to Love" (with Sofía Reyes)	2016	Roboshobo	
"Broken Drum" (featuring Fitz & the Tantrum)	2016	Joe Zohar	
"Millionaire" (with Digital Farm Animals & Nelly)	2016	Sesan Ogunro	
"All My Love" (featuring Conor Maynard)	2017	Joe Zohar	
"Belong" (with Dashboard Confessional)	2017	Joe Zohar	
"Finest Hour" (featuring Abir)	2018	Phillip R Lopez	
"Too Late" (featuring Wiz Khalifa & Lukas Graham)	2021	Cody LaPlant	
"Bleach (Move On)"	2023	Michael Della Polla	

== Remixes and production ==
Year	Title
2008	Cobra Starship featuring Tyga – City Is at War (Remix)
2008	Tyga – No Introduction (Additional programming)
2009	Cobra Starship – Good Girls Go Bad (Remix)
2009	Cobra Starship – Monkey Magic (Mixed)
2010	Stereo Skyline – Tongue Tied (Remix)
2010	Millionaires – Stay the Night (Remix)
2011	All Time Low – I Feel Like Dancin' (Remix)
2011	Big Time Rush – Til I Forget About You (Remix)
2012	Boys Like Girls – Crazy World LP (Additional production)
2012	Calvin Harris featuring Ne-Yo – Let's Go (Remix)
2012	Conor Maynard – Vegas Girl (Remix)
2012	Jeffree Star – Legs Up (Co-wrote, production and mixed)
2012	Katy Perry – Part of Me (Remix with The Jane Doze)
2012	Lady Gaga – Marry the Night (Remix)
2012	Kelly Clarkson – Catch My Breath (Remix)
2012	Krewella – Alive (Cash Cash x Kalkutta Remix)
2012	Megan & Liz – Bad For Me (Additional production)
2012	Nervo and Hook N Sling – Reason (Remix with The Jane Doze)
2013	Nicky Romero – Symphonica (Remix)
2013	Bruno Mars – Treasure (Remix)
2013	Capital Cities – Safe And Sound (Cash Cash Remix)
2013	Vicetone – Heartbeat (Remix)
2013	Krewella – Live for the Night (Produced and co-wrote)
2013	Icona Pop – All Night (Remix)
2013	Clinton Sparks featuring 2 Chainz, Macklemore and DA – Gold Rush (Cash Cash x Gazzo Remix)
2013	Showtek – Booyah (Remix)
2013	Hardwell featuring Matthew Koma – Dare You (Cash Cash Remix)
2014	Rudimental – Free (Cash Cash x Gazzo Remix)
2014	Clean Bandit featuring Jess Glynne – Rather Be (Cash Cash x Valley Remix)
2014	Katy Perry – Birthday (Cash Cash Remix)
2015	Rudimental and Ed Sheeran – Lay It All On Me (Cash Cash Remix)
2016	Years & Years – King (Cash Cash Remix)
2016	Britney Spears featuring G-Eazy – Make Me (Cash Cash Remix)
2016	Tritonal and Jenaux featuring Adam Lambert – Broken (Cash Cash Remix)
2016	David Guetta and Cedric Gervais – Would I Lie To You (Cash Cash Remix)
2017	Jon Bellion – All Time Low (Cash Cash Remix)
2017	Clean Bandit featuring Zara Larsson – Symphony (Cash Cash Remix)
2017	Pink - What About Us (Cash Cash Remix)
2017	Kelly Clarkson - Love So Soft (Cash Cash Remix)
2017	Liam Payne - Bedroom Floor (Cash Cash Remix)
2018	Troye Sivan - My My My! (Cash Cash Remix)
2018	Lovelytheband - Broken (Cash Cash Remix)
2019	Why Don't We - What Am I (Cash Cash Remix)
2020	Morgan Evans - Diamonds (Cash Cash Remix)
2020	Pussycat Dolls - React (Cash Cash Remix)
2021	AJR - Way Less Sad (Cash Cash Remix)
