= Lightning (Cash Cash song) =

Single by Cash Cash featuring John Rzeznik

from the album Lightning and Blood, Sweat & 3 Years
- Released: June 17, 2014
- Genre: EDM; electro house
- Length: 3:33
- Label: Big Beat; Atlantic
- Songwriters: Samuel Frisch; Jean Paul Makhlouf; Alex Makhlouf; John Rzeznik
- Producer: Cash Cash

Cash Cash singles chronology
"Take Me Home" (2013)	"Lightning" (2014)	"Surrender" (2014)

Music video
- "Lightning" (lyric video) on YouTube

"Lightning" is a song by American electronic music group Cash Cash. The song was released on June 17, 2014, as the lead single from their third extended play Lightning. The song also appeared on the group's debut studio album Blood, Sweat & 3 Years (2016). It features guest vocals from John Rzeznik of the Goo Goo Dolls. The song peaked at number 39 on the US Hot Dance/Electronic Songs chart.

== Background ==
On March 24, 2014, Cash Cash released their third extended play, Lightning. Prior to the EP's release, the group streamed the title track on March 9, via SoundCloud. Featuring guest vocals from John Rzeznik of the Goo Goo Dolls, Jean Paul Makhlouf said the band was an influence to the trio. He also described recording the track with Rezeznik as "one of those priceless unforgettable moments."

The song was later released as an official single on June 17, 2014, for digital download.

== Composition ==
"Lightning" was written by Samuel Frisch, Jean Paul Makhlouf, Alex Makhlouf and John Rzeznik, while production was handled by Cash Cash. Musically, the track is described as EDM and electro house.

== Versions ==
On August 5, 2014, Cash Cash released the Lightning Remixes EP, featuring remixes of the song from Dash Berlin, EDX's Miami Sunset, Sex Panther, Audiobot, Jump Smokers and Roter & Lewis.

== Critical reception ==
Alexandra Blair of Dancing Astronaut said of the song, "mixing and mastering efforts on Rzeznik's rich vocal stems in 'Lightning' suggest an attention to detail, audible vocal fry, missing from most radio ready EDM like Rihanna's inhumanly thin and choppily looped 'This Is What You Came For' hook."

== Track listing ==
Digital download
No.	Title	Length
1.	"Lightning" (feat. John Rzeznik)	3:33

Digital download – Lightning EP
No.	Title	Length
1.	"Lightning" (feat. John Rzeznik)	3:33
2.	"Satellites" (Qulinez remix) (radio edit)	3:26
3.	"Overtime" (Candyland & DotEXE remix)	4:20
4.	"Take Me Home" (feat. Bebe Rexha) (Patrick Hagenaar Colour Code remix)	3:33

Digital download – remixes EP
No.	Title	Length
1.	"Lightning" (Dash Berlin 4AM remix)	5:35
2.	"Lightning" (Dash Berlin 4AM radio edit)	3:20
3.	"Lightning" (EDX's Miami Sunset remix)	5:54
4.	"Lightning" (EDX's radio edit)	3:46
5.	"Lightning" (Sex Panther remix)	6:24
6.	"Lightning" (Audiobot remix)	6:24
7.	"Lightning" (Jump Smokers remix)	3:56
8.	"Lightning" (Roter & Lewis remix)	4:19

== Personnel ==
Credits for "Lightning" adapted from the album's liner notes.

Cash Cash

- Jean Paul Makhlouf – composer, mastering, mixing, producer, recording
- Alex Makhlouf – composer, mastering, mixing, producer, recording
- Samuel Frisch – composer, mastering, mixing, producer, recording

Additional musicians

- John Rzeznik – composer, featured artist, vocals

== Charts ==
Chart performance for "Lightning"
Chart (2014)	Peak position
US Hot Dance/Electronic Songs (Billboard)	39

== Release history ==
Release dates and formats for "Lightning"
Region	Date	Format(s)	Label	Ref.
Various	June 17, 2014	Digital download; streaming	Big Beat	
