= FTampa =

Brazilian DJ (born 1987)

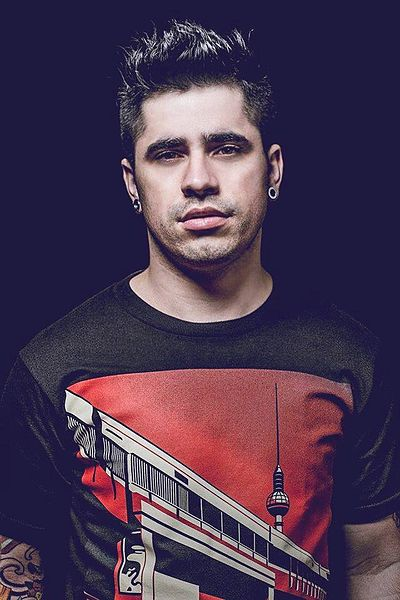

Background information
- Also known as: Felipe Tampa
- Born: Felipe Augusto Ramos; 2 June 1987 (age 38); Conselheiro Lafaiete, Minas Gerais, Brazil
- Genres: EDM; Electro house; House; Progressive house
- Occupations: Musician; DJ; record producer
- Instruments: Piano; Guitar; Synthesizer
- Years active: 2010–present
- Labels: Revealed Recordings; Spinnin' Records; Doorn Records; Musical Freedom; Metanoia Music
- Website: ftampa.com/

Felipe Augusto Ramos (born 2 June 1987), better known by his stage name FTampa, is a Brazilian DJ and record producer.

== Career ==
FTampa has been a rock musician since childhood, having learned to play the guitar and keyboard in his hometown of Conselheiro Lafaiete, MG. After moving to Belo Horizonte, he became disheartened with a somewhat disappointing music scene, and started working in marketing. In 2011, he was introduced to electronic music by a cousin, and took an interest in it, mainly because a backing band was not needed. He adopted the pseudonym Tampa (Portuguese for "cork"), his nickname since childhood because of his short stature, released his first EP and began to build his career. By going to the United States, he found that another DJ already used the name Tampa and added the initial of his name, becoming FTampa.

His musical style, a version of electro house called complextro, tried to enter the history in bands with more acoustic elements. However, in 2013, his style began to move away from complextro, and more towards a more mainstream, big-room sound. FTampa began to stand out in the middle when Dutch DJ Hardwell started playing his track "Kick It Hard" in concerts. FTampa entered the repertoire of other famous DJs such as David Guetta, Calvin Harris, Afrojack and Tiësto, leading to invitations to international festivals like Burning Man (2013) and Rock in Rio Las Vegas (2015), and works with artists like Chris Brown and Paulo Ricardo. In 2016, FTampa made 12 monthly presentations in houses in Belo Horizonte and Los Angeles. He had songs included in commercials and soundtracks, and reached the top spot on Beatport website in 2015. On 24 July 2016 FTampa became the first Brazilian to perform at the main stage at Tomorrowland, the largest electronic music festival in the world, in Belgium.

== Awards and nominations ==
- First Brazilian ever to perform on the Main Stage of Tomorrowland Belgium (2016)

Year	Award	Nominated work	Category	Result
2015	DJ Mag	FTampa	Top 101-150 DJs	No. 116

Year	Award	Nominated work	Category	Result
2016	DJ Mag	FTampa	Top 101-150 DJs	No. 105

Year	Award	Nominated work	Category	Result
2017	DJ Mag	FTampa	Top 101-150 DJs	No. 108

Year	Award	Nominated work	Category	Result
2015	HouseMag	FTampa	Top 50 DJs	No. 5

Year	Award	Nominated work	Category	Result
	HouseMag	FTampa	Top 50 DJs	No. 7

== Discography ==
=== Charting singles ===
Year	Title	Peak chart positions												Album
Year	Title	AUS	AUT	BEL (Vl)	BEL (Wa)	FIN	FRA	GER	IRL	NLD	SWE	SWI	UK	Album
2015	"031" (with The Fish House)	—	—	19^{[A]}	—	—	—	—	—	—	—	—	—	Non-album single
"—" denotes a recording that did not chart or was not released in that territory.

=== Singles ===
Only singles released since 2012 are listed below:

- 2012: Brazealand (with Ryan Enzed) [Enzed Recordings]
- 2012: We Are The Real Motherfuckers (with Alex Mind) [BugEyed Records]
- 2013: Chaos [Sick Slaughterhouse]
- 2013: Run Away (Vocal & Instrumental Mix) [Vicious]
- 2013: Kick It Hard [Vicious]
- 2013: Do It Yourself (with Paniek) [Big & Dirty (Be Yourself Music)]
- 2013: Hero / Make Some Noise EP [Vicious]
- 2013: Yes (with Vandalism) [Vicious]
- 2014: Twice [Vicious]
- 2014: Falcon (with Bruno Barudi) [Revealed Recordings]
- 2014: Kismet (with Goldfish & Blink) [Revealed Recordings]
- 2014: Samba (with Klauss Goulart) [Metanoia Music (Arisa Audio)]
- 2014: 97 (with Kenneth G) [Revealed Recordings]
- 2014: 5 Days [Doorn (Spinnin')]
- 2014: Push! (with HiFi) [Vicious]
- 2014: Slammer (with Quintino) [Spinnin Records]
- 2015: Slap (with Felguk) [Vicious]
- 2015: Troy (with WAO) [Revealed Recordings]
- 2015: That Drop [Revealed Recordings]
- 2015: 031 (with The Fish House) [Doorn (Spinnin')]
- 2015: Strike It Up [Musical Freedom]
- 2015: Lifetime (with Sex Room) [Doorn (Spinnin')]
- 2016: Need You (with Sex Room) [Revealed Recordings]
- 2016: Stay (with Amanda Wilson) [Sony Music]
- 2016: Our Way (with Kamatos) [Sony Music]
- 2017: Love Is All We Need (with Anne M.) [Sony Music]
- 2017: Glowing [Sony Music]
- 2017: Light Me Up [Sony Music]
- 2017: You Gotta Be (with Mobin Master and Kamatos) [Sony Music]
- 2018: Who We Are [Sony Music]
- 2018: Shahar (with 22Bullets) [Dharma]
- 2019: One Last Time (with Maggie Szabo) [Sony Music]
- 2019: Lakers (with The Otherz and Nuzb) [Sprs]
- 2019: F.I.A. [Musician]
- 2020: InstaDJ [2019]
- 2020: Bed Ain't Big Enough (Babe) (featuring Saint War) [Spinnin' Records]
- 2022: Sugar Baby (with Flakke featuring Luisah) [Hysteria Records]

=== Remixes ===
- 2011: Cine - #emchoque (FTampa Remix) [Universal Music]
- 2013: Hide and Scream - Vitalic (FTampa Remix) [Filthy Bitch]
- 2013: DJ Exodus, Leewise - We Are Your Friends (FTampa Remix) [Peak Hour Music]
- 2014: Avicii - Jailbait (FTampa Vicious21 Remix) [Vicious]
- 2014: Darth & Vader - Extermination (FTampa Remix) [Sick Slaughterhouse]
- 2015: Nervo - Hey Ricky (FTampa Remix) [Ultra]
- 2016: Tritonal, Steph Jones - Blackout (FTampa Remix) [Enhanced Recordings]
- 2016: Cash Cash, Digital Farm Animals, Nelly - Millionaire (FTampa Remix)
- 2016: MAGIC! - Red Dress (FTampa Remix)
- 2016: Tinashe - Superlove (FTampa Remix)
- 2016: Britney Spears, G-Eazy - Make Me... (FTampa Remix)
- 2017: Dia Frampton - Crave (FTampa Remix)
- 2017: Bruno Martini - Living on the Outside (FTampa Remix)
- 2017: Magic! - Darts in the Dark (FTampa Remix)
- 2018: Bob Sinclar, Akon - Til the Sun Rise Up (FTampa and Mark Ursa Remix)
- 2018: The Knocks featuring Sofi Tukker - Brazilian Soul (FTampa Remix)
- 2019: Cat Dealers, Bruno Martini and Joy Corporation - Gone Too Long (FTampa Remix)
- 2019: Jagwar Twin - Loser (FTampa Remix)
