= Call You (song) =

Single by Cash Cash featuring Nasri

from the album Say It Like You Feel It
- Released: November 30, 2018
- Genre: Dance
- Length: 3:39
- Label: Big Beat; Atlantic
- Songwriters: Samuel Frisch; Jean Paul Makhlouf; Alex Makhlouf; Nasri Atweh
- Producer: Cash Cash

Cash Cash singles chronology
"Finest Hour" (2018)	"Call You" (2018)	"Can We Pretend" (2019)

Nasri singles chronology
"Call You" (2018)	"No Peace" (2024)

Music video
- "Call You" on YouTube

"Call You" is a song by American electronic music group Cash Cash. The song was released on November 30, 2018, as the sixth single from their fifth studio album Say It Like You Feel It. It features guest vocals from Nasri of Magic!. A remixes EP was released January 18, 2019. The song peaked at number eight on the US Dance Airplay chart.

== Background and recording ==
Cash Cash first met Nasri during a writing session, two years prior of their collaboration on "Call You". The trio asked Nasri if he wanted to sing on a track for them, which he agreed to. A demo of the song was recorded in Los Angeles. According to Jean Paul Makhlouf, the trio wanted to re-record Nasri's vocals, however, he needed vocal surgery due to nodules on his vocal chords and was unable to do it. Makhlouf explained the reason for wanting to re-record the vocals because of the original recording having a "high pitch sound" in the background from an air conditioning fan, which was driving them "crazy." Eventually, the trio managed to remove the sound using restoration Waves plugins.

Nasri stated the song was about "feeling alone and wondering if there is anybody out there listening to you during those hard times." Cash Cash also said that working with Nasri, "brought things to another level."

A remixes EP was released on January 18, 2019, which features remixes from Breathe Carolina, The Him and Crossnaders. Additionally, a remix by Zack Martino was released separately on February 1.

== Composition ==
"Call You" was written by Samuel Frisch, Jean Paul Makhlouf, Alex Makhlouf and Nasri Atweh, while production was handled by Cash Cash. Musically, it is described as a song with an "'80s-style dance beat."

== Chart performance ==
"Call You" debuted at number 37 on the Billboard Dance Airplay chart for the week ending December 22, 2018. The song later peaked at number eight. The song also reached number one on US dance radio.

== Track listing ==
Digital download
No.	Title	Length
1.	"Call You" (feat. Nasri)	3:39

Digital download – remix
No.	Title	Length
1.	"Call You" (feat. Nasri) (Zack Martino remix)	3:39

Digital download – remixes EP
No.	Title	Length
1.	"Call You" (feat. Nasri) (Breathe Carolina remix)	3:22
2.	"Call You" (feat. Nasri) (The Him remix)	4:16
3.	"Call You" (feat. Nasri) (Going Deeper remix)	3:48
4.	"Call You" (feat. Nasri) (Steff da Campo remix)	2:53
5.	"Call You" (feat. Nasri) (Crossnaders remix)	2:35

== Personnel ==
Credits for "Call You" adapted from the digital liner notes.

Cash Cash

- Jean Paul Makhlouf – composer, mastering, mixing, producer, background vocals
- Alex Makhlouf – composer, mastering, mixing, producer, background vocals
- Samuel Frisch – composer, mastering, mixing, producer

Additional musicians

- Nasri – composer, featured artist, vocals

Additional production

- Ben Castillo – recording, additional engineer

== Charts ==
=== Weekly charts ===
Weekly chart performance for "Call You"
Chart (2018)	Peak position
US Dance Airplay (Billboard)	8

=== Year-end charts ===
Year-end chart performance for "Call You"
Chart (2019)	Position
US Dance Airplay (Billboard)	29

== Release history ==
Release dates and formats for "Call You"
Region	Date	Format(s)	Label	Ref.
Various	November 30, 2018	Digital download; streaming	Big Beat	
