= How to Love (disambiguation) =

"How to Love" is a 2011 song by Lil Wayne.

How to Love may also refer to:

- How to Love (Cash Cash song), 2016, featuring Sofía Reyes
- How to Love (film), a 1947 Swedish film
- How to Love, a 2023 non-fiction graphic novel by Alex Norris (cartoonist)
- "How to Love", a song by Sister Sledge from Love Somebody Today, 1980
- "How to Love", a song by SG Wannabe from My Friend, 2008
- How to Love, a 2023 album by Withered Hand
- 怎么爱 (Pinyin: "Zěnme Ài"; English: "How to Love"), a Chinese song by BoBo
