= Blood, Sweat & 3 Years =

Studio album by Cash Cash
- Released: June 24, 2016
- Recorded: 2013–16
- Genres: EDM; dance-pop
- Labels: Big Beat; Atlantic
- Producers: Cash Cash; Digital Farm Animals

Cash Cash chronology
| Lightning EP (2014) | Blood, Sweat & 3 Years (2016) | Say It Like You Feel It (2021) |

Singles from Blood, Sweat & 3 Years
- 1. "Aftershock" Released: January 29, 2016; 2. "How to Love" Released: April 29, 2016; 3. "Millionaire" Released: June 3, 2016; 4. "Broken Drum" Released: June 17, 2016

Blood, Sweat & 3 Years is the fourth studio album by American electronic music group Cash Cash, released on June 24, 2016, by Big Beat Records and Atlantic Records. It is their first full-length album since signing to Big Beat, following the release of the Overtime and Lightning EPs. Blood, Sweat & 3 Years includes collaborations with singers Anjulie, Bebe Rexha, Chrish, Christina Perri, Dev, Jacquie Lee, Jenna Andrews, John Rzeznik from the Goo Goo Dolls, Julia Michaels, Michael Fitzpatrick of Fitz and the Tantrums, Neon Hitch, and Sofia Reyes; rappers B.o.B, Busta Rhymes, Nelly, and Trinidad James; DJ Digital Farm Animals; and groups Little Daylight and Night Terrors of 1927.

== Background and composition ==
On April 28, 2016, the group announced the track listing and release date for Blood, Sweat & 3 Years. The album's artwork was also revealed, with pre-orders made available on April 29. The album was produced by the group themselves and Digital Farm Animals. The album took 36 months to complete. Jean Paul Makhlouf spoke about the long process of finishing the album.

"The biggest thing that makes it hard for us to put out albums left and right is that we're not all home in one place for enough time. We play a lot of shows together, but most of the touring is done with me and Sam, and there's only so much that Alex or one of us can do back home in the studio. Sam can finish ideas that we started or he can keep things moving in a direction, but ultimately, we all need to be home in the studio to make a final product."

The title of the album comes from a representation of the last three years of the groups lives. Musically, the album is described as EDM and dance-pop. Featuring collaborations with Bebe Rexha, Christina Perri, John Rzeznik from the Goo Goo Dolls, Sofia Reyes, B.o.B Busta Rhymes and Trinidad James, among many more, Jean Paul Makhlouf said "we merged some really unique artists from so many different genres to make an extremely diverse-yet-cohesive album."

Following the release of the album, the group embarked on a 2016 headlining tour called Must Be the Money Tour. The tour took place in the United States beginning in October, and concluding in December.

== Singles ==
"Take Me Home", featuring guest vocals from singer Bebe Rexha, was released on July 15, 2013, originally from the band's 2013 EP Overtime. It was later included on Blood, Sweat & 3 Years as its first single. It reached number 57 on the Billboard Hot 100 selling 488,000 downloads, becoming their first (and, to date, only) charting single in the US. It also reached number 6 on the Dance/Electronic Songs chart. It also peaked within the top ten in Australia and the UK. The music video premiered on December 18, 2013. "Lightning", featuring guest vocals from Goo Goo Dolls frontman John Rzeznik, was released on March 24, 2014. It was originally from the band's 2014 EP Lightning, but was later included as the second single from Blood, Sweat & 3 Years. Unlike "Take Me Home", "Lightning" did not chart. The lyric video premiered on August 11, 2014. "Surrender", featuring uncredited guest vocals from singer and songwriter Julia Michaels, was released on September 16, 2014, as the third single from the album. Although it did not chart on the Hot 100, it did reach number 19 on the Dance/Electronic Songs chart. The music video premiered on January 15, 2015.

"Devil", featuring guest vocals from rappers Busta Rhymes and B.o.B and singer Neon Hitch, was released on August 7, 2015, as the album's fourth single. It reached number 28 on the Dance/Electronic songs chart, and number 110 in the UK. "Escarole" was released on December 11, 2015, as the album's fifth single.

"Aftershock", featuring guest vocals from singer Jacquie Lee, was released on January 29, 2016, as the album's sixth single. The music video premiered on March 16, 2016. "How to Love", featuring guest vocals from Mexican singer Sofia Reyes, was released on April 29, 2016, as the album's seventh single. It peaked at number 16 on the Dance/Electronic Songs chart. The music video premiered on the same day. "Millionaire", their collaboration with British DJ Digital Farm Animals, featuring guest vocals from rapper Nelly, was released on June 3, 2016, as the album's eighth single. It debuted at number 22 on the Dance/Electronic Songs chart. The music video was released on June 27, 2016. "Broken Drum", featuring guest vocals from Michael Fitzpatrick of Fitz and the Tantrums, was released on June 17, 2016, as the album's ninth single, accompanied by a music video.

== Critical reception ==
Professional ratings
Review scores
| Source | Rating |
|---|---|
| AllMusic | 4/5 stars |
| Renowned for Sound | 2/5 stars |
| We Got This Covered | 3.5/5 stars |

Alexendra Blair from Dancing Astronaut wrote that Cash Cash have "delivered a quality pop music release on which any song could be a confetti-drenched closer" by praising their track production and the appearance of quality collaborators such as Christina Perri and Michael Fitzpatrick of Fitz and the Tantrums. She then criticised Nelly's performance on "Millionaire" by describing it as a "whitewashing of the rapper's sometimes gritty and often wryly wrought vocal style" and felt that "Devil" was "hollow with a sanitized inauthenticity" despite strong verses from B.o.B and Busta Rhymes. AllMusic's Neil Z. Yeung gave the album a 4/5 rating and stated that it was a "celebration of the many facets of dance in the 2010s EDM era, from trap to tropical and everything in between". He complimented their "impressive list of guests for the effort" and said that the brightest moments of the record came courtesy of the female vocalists, who bring a "carefree and breezy energy to balance the machismo". Connor Jones from We Got This Covered felt like the album "plays more like a loose collection of songs than a cohesive whole", due to some tracks being released back in 2013 which causes them to feel mismatched when listened to. He continued by stating that the record feels repetitious and formulaic regarding its female led vocal collaborations, even with the presence of many excellent tracks. The critic concluded by writing that tracks like "How To Love" which "strike the right balance between radio friendly pop and crowd pleasing dance rhythms" works best in Blood, Sweat & 3 Years, and praised the "crystal clear mixing" and "excellent synth work" on the record.

Daniel Patrin of Renowned For Sound granted the record a 2/5 rating and stated that it consisted of "calculable, artificial pop music with forced momentum", mimicking the works of Afrojack and Swedish House Mafia which made it lack "any real aspects of individualism".

== Track listing ==
All tracks produced by Cash Cash, except "Millionaire" produced by Cash Cash and Digital Farm Animals.

| No. | Title | Writer(s) | Length |
|---|---|---|---|
| 1. | "How to Love" (featuring Sofia Reyes) | Samuel Frisch; Alex Makhlouf; Jean Paul Makhlouf; Jennifer Decilveo; Ilsey Juber | 3:38 |
| 2. | "Broken Drum" (featuring Fitz of Fitz and the Tantrums) | Frisch; A. Makhlouf; J. Makhlouf; Michael Fitzpatrick | 3:18 |
| 3. | "Millionaire" (with Digital Farm Animals featuring Nelly) | Frisch; A. Makhlouf; J. Makhlouf; Eldra DeBarge; Jason Epperson; Nicholas Gale; Cornell Haynes, Jr.; Etterlene Jordan; Lavell Webb | 3:06 |
| 4. | "Hero" (featuring Christina Perri) | Frisch; A. Makhlouf; J. Makhlouf; Christina Perri | 3:18 |
| 5. | "Devil" (featuring Busta Rhymes, B.o.B & Neon Hitch) | Frisch; A. Makhlouf; J. Makhlouf; Neon Hitch; Bobby Ray Simmons, Jr.; Trevor Smith | 3:29 |
| 6. | "Aftershock" (featuring Jacquie Lee) | Frisch; A. Makhlouf; J. Makhlouf; Erin Beck | 3:25 |
| 7. | "The Gun" (featuring Trinidad James, Dev & Chrish) | Frisch; A. Makhlouf; J. Makhlouf; Leah Haywood; Ashton Parson; Devin Tailes; Nicholas Williams | 3:22 |
| 8. | "Turn" (featuring Little Daylight) | Frisch; A. Makhlouf; J. Makhlouf; Matt Lewkowicz; Nikki Taylor; Eric Zeiler | 3:39 |
| 9. | "Escarole" | Frisch; A. Makhlouf; J. Makhlouf | 4:01 |
| 10. | "Lightning" (featuring John Rzeznik of Goo Goo Dolls) | Frisch; A. Makhlouf; J. Makhlouf; John Rzeznik | 3:34 |
| 11. | "Arrows in the Dark" (featuring Anjulie) | Frisch; A. Makhlouf; J. Makhlouf; Anjulie Persaud | 3:38 |
| 12. | "We Will Live" (featuring Night Terrors of 1927) | Frisch; A. Makhlouf; J. Makhlouf; Jarrod Gorbel | 3:50 |
| 13. | "Bada Boom" | Frisch; A. Makhlouf; J. Makhlouf | 4:02 |
| 14. | "Take Me Home" (featuring Bebe Rexha) | Frisch; A. Makhlouf; J. Makhlouf; Brandon Lowry; Bebe Rexha | 3:25 |
| 15. | "Sweat" (featuring Jenna Andrews) | Frisch; A. Makhlouf; J. Makhlouf; Jenna Andrews | 3:33 |
| 16. | "Surrender" | Frisch; A. Makhlouf; J. Makhlouf; Tal Meltzer; Julia Michaels; Philip Patterson; Lindy Robbins; Linus Wiklund | 3:28 |
| Total length: | | | 56:46 |

== Personnel ==
Credits for Blood, Sweat & 3 Years adapted from AllMusic.

Cash Cash

- Samuel Frisch – composer, DJ, mastering, mixing, producer, programming
- Alex Makhlouf – composer, keyboards, mastering, mixing, producer, programming
- Jean Paul Makhlouf – composer, mastering, mixing, producer, programming, vocals

Additional musicians

- Jenna Andrews – composer, featured artist
- Anjulie – featured artist
- B.o.B – featured artist
- Busta Rhymes – featured artist
- Dev & Chrish – composer, featured artist
- Fitz and the Tantrums – featured artist
- Leah Haywood – backing vocals
- Neon Hitch – composer, featured artist
- Trinidad James – featured artist
- Jacquie Lee – featured artist
- Little Daylight – featured artist
- Nelly – featured artist
- Night Terrors of 1927 – featured artist
- Christina Perri – composer, featured artist
- Bebe Rexha – composer, featured artist
- Sofia Reyes – featured artist
- John Rzeznik – composer, featured artist

Production

- Erin Beck – composer
- El DeBarge – composer
- Jennifer Decilveo – composer
- Digital Farm Animals – producer
- Jay E – composer
- Michael Fitzpatrick – composer
- Nick Gale – composer
- Jarrod Gorbel – composer
- Etterlene Jordan – composer
- Ilsey Juber – composer
- Matthew Lewkowicz – composer
- Brandon Lowry – composer
- Tal Meltzer – composer
- Julia Michaels – composer
- Ashton Parson – composer
- Jonas Philip Patterson – composer
- Lindy Robbins – composer
- Trevor Smith – composer
- Nikki Taylor – composer
- Lavell Webb – composer
- Linus Wiklund – composer
- Nicholaus Williams – composer
- Eric Zeiler – composer

== Charts ==
Chart performance for Blood, Sweat & 3 Years
| Chart (2016) | Peak position |
|---|---|
| Australian Hitseekers Albums (ARIA) | 18 |
| Canadian Albums (Billboard) | 97 |
| Japanese Hot Albums (Billboard Japan) | 76 |
| Taiwanese Albums (Five Music) | 6 |
| US Billboard 200 | 125 |
| US Top Dance Albums (Billboard) | 3 |

== Certifications ==
Certifications and sales figures for Blood, Sweat & 3 Years
| Region | Certification | Certified units/sales |
|---|---|---|
| South Korea (KMCA) | Platinum | 250,000^{^} |
^{^} Shipments figures based on certification alone.

== Release history ==
Release formats for Blood, Sweat & 3 Years
| Region | Date | Format(s) | Label | Ref. |
|---|---|---|---|---|
| Various | June 24, 2016 | CD; digital download | Big Beat; Atlantic | |
