= Aftershock (Cash Cash song) =

Single by Cash Cash featuring Jacquie Lee

from the album Blood, Sweat & 3 Years
- Released: 29 January 2016
- Recorded: 2015–16
- Genre: Progressive house
- Length: 3:26
- Label: Big Beat
- Songwriters: Samuel Frisch; Alex Makhlouf; Jean Paul Makhlouf; Erin Beck
- Producer: Cash Cash

Cash Cash singles chronology
"Escarole" (2015)	"Aftershock" (2016)	"How to Love" (2016)

Jacquie Lee singles chronology
"Tears Fall" (2015)	"Aftershock" (2016)	"Somebody's Angel" (2016)

"Aftershock" is a song by American electronic music group Cash Cash, it was released by Beatport on 29 January 2016 as the sixth single for their fourth studio album, Blood, Sweat & 3 Years. The song features Jacquie Lee, the runner-up of season 5 of NBC's singing competition, The Voice.

"Aftershock" has gained over three million streams on Spotify.

== Background ==
According to Cash Cash, "the lyrics, the melody, the synth riff, and the emotion they evoke all together" were worked on first; "everything else was secondary." The aforementioned American electronic music group has stated that the recording process for the song "was a total vacation from the way they had been working lately." Cash Cash revealed the song's cover art and release date via Twitter on 21 January 2016.

== Critical reception ==
EDM Sauce praised Jacquie Lee's "beautiful vocals" on the track, and opined, "from the early days of 'Take Me Home' to this latest release in 'Aftershock.' Cash Cash never disappoints.

== Music video ==
The official music video for the song was uploaded to Cash Cash's official YouTube channel on 16 March 2016.

== Track listing ==
Digital download
No.	Title	Length
1.	"Aftershock"	3:26

Scndl Remix
No.	Title	Length
1.	"Aftershock" (SCNDL Remix)	3:48

== Other remixes ==
On 31 March 2016, Justin Caruso released a remix for the song. Truse Tarzan has also released a remix for the song.

== Chart performance ==
Chart (2016)	Peak position
South Korea International Chart (GAON)	83
US Dance/Mix Show Airplay (Billboard)	34
