= Millionaire (Cash Cash and Digital Farm Animals song) =

Single by Cash Cash and Digital Farm Animals featuring Nelly

from the album Blood, Sweat & 3 Years
- Released: June 3, 2016
- Genre: Electronic
- Length: 3:06
- Label: Big Beat; Warner
- Songwriters: Samuel Frisch; Alexander Makhlouf; Jean Paul Makhlouf; El DeBarge; Jason Epperson; Cornell Haynes, Jr.; Nicholas Gale; Etterlene Jordan; Lavell Webb
- Producers: A. Makhlouf; J. Makhlouf; Frisch; Gale

Cash Cash singles chronology
"How to Love" (2016)	"Millionaire" (2016)	"Broken Drum" (2016)

Digital Farm Animals singles chronology
"Wanna Know" (2016)	"Millionaire" (2016)	"Only One" (2016)

Nelly singles chronology
"Die a Happy Man" (2016)	"Millionaire" (2016)	"Freaky with You" (2018)

Music video
- "Millionaire" on YouTube

"Millionaire" is a song by American DJ trio Cash Cash and British DJ Digital Farm Animals. It features vocals from American rapper Nelly, and was released digitally as the eighth single from their fourth studio album, Blood, Sweat & 3 Years, on June 3, 2016.

== Background ==
"Millionaire" premiered via Billboard on June 2, 2016, before it was released as a single the following day. On August 12, the trio released a remix EP for "Millionaire", as well as an Alan Walker remix, which was released separately on September 2.

== Composition and recording ==
The song was written by Nelly, Nicholas Gale, Eldra Debarge, Etterlene Jordan, Jason Epperson, Alexander Makhlouf, Jean Paul Makhlouf, Lavell Webb, and Samuel Frisch, with production being handled by Cash Cash and Digital Farm Animals. According to Jean Paul Makhlouf, the group sent 20 hours in the studio working on the song. One of the lyrics pays homage to Nelly's hit single "Ride wit Me", where he sings "Hey, must be the money."

"It was nuts because it was such a different process for us. We didn't know what to expect you know, his work versus ours. We just didn’t know what to expect. When he came in he lit up the room. The energy was on fire. He showed us a different way to make music. A lot of the times we get stiff in the studio, the three of us, very work oriented and very tight. He was just so loose and brought the party. I think it shows in the song we made. It’s such a feel good, fun song."

== Music video ==
A music video for the song, directed by Sesan Ogunro, was released on June 27, 2016. The video features Nelly in a mansion throwing a house party with cars and beautiful people.

== Track listing ==
Digital download
No.	Title	Length
1.	"Millionaire" (featuring Nelly)	3:06

Digital download – Remixes EP
No.	Title	Length
1.	"Millionaire" (featuring Nelly) (Cash Cash Remix)	5:08
2.	"Millionaire" (featuring Nelly) (Bad Royale Remix)	3:50
3.	"Millionaire" (featuring Nelly) (Riggi & Piros Remix)	3:37
4.	"Millionaire" (featuring Nelly) (FTampa Remix)	2:43
5.	"Millionaire" (featuring Nelly) (JayKode Remix)	3:30
6.	"Millionaire" (featuring Nelly) (Jackal Remix)	3:25
7.	"Millionaire" (featuring Nelly) (DJ Fresh Remix)	3:22
Total length:		25:35

Digital download – Alan Walker Remix
No.	Title	Length
1.	"Millionaire" (featuring Nelly) (Alan Walker Remix)	3:09

== Awards and nominations ==
Awards and nominations for "Millionaire"
Year	Organization	Award	Result	Ref(s)
2017	Radio Disney Music Awards	Best Dance Track	Nominated	

== Charts ==
=== Weekly charts ===
Chart (2016)	Peak position
Australia (ARIA)	63
Belgium (Ultratip Bubbling Under Wallonia)	33
Ireland (IRMA)	54
Czech Republic Airplay (ČNS IFPI)	96
Mexico Ingles Airplay (Billboard)	39
Netherlands (Dutch Top 40 Tipparade)	4
Netherlands (Single Top 100)	46
New Zealand Heatseekers (Recorded Music NZ)	10
Norway (VG-lista)	19
Poland Airplay (ZPAV)	78
Scotland Singles (OCC)	20
Slovakia Airplay (ČNS IFPI)	88
Sweden (Sverigetopplistan)	98
UK Singles (OCC)	25
UK Dance (OCC)	11
US Hot Dance/Electronic Songs (Billboard)	22

=== Year-end charts ===
Chart (2016)	Position
US Hot Dance/Electronic Songs (Billboard)	64

== Certifications ==
Region	Certification	Certified units/sales
Australia (ARIA)	Gold	35,000^{‡}
New Zealand (RMNZ)	Gold	15,000^{‡}
United Kingdom (BPI)	Gold	400,000^{‡}
^{‡} Sales+streaming figures based on certification alone.

== Release history ==
Region	Date	Format	Label	Ref.
United States	June 3, 2016	Digital download	Big Beat; Warner	
United States	July 26, 2016	Top 40 radio	Records	
United States	August 12, 2016	Digital download (Remixes EP)	Big Beat; Warner	
United Kingdom	August 12, 2016	Contemporary hit radio	Big Beat; Warner	
United States	September 2, 2016	Digital download (Alan Walker Remix)	Big Beat; Warner	
