= Overtime (Cash Cash song) =

Single by Cash Cash

from the EP Overtime
- Released: November 26, 2012
- Genre: Nu disco; indie dance
- Length: 4:09
- Label: Big Beat
- Songwriters: Samuel Frisch; Alex Makhlouf; Jean Paul Makhlouf; Dan Hartman; Solomon Olds
- Producer: Cash Cash

Cash Cash singles chronology
"I Like It Loud" (2012)	"Overtime" (2012)	"Take Me Home" (2014)

"Overtime" is a song by American electronic music group Cash Cash. It was released on November 26, 2012, as the lead single from the group's second EP Overtime. It was made available for a free download on SoundCloud before being released digitally on streaming services on October 8, 2013.

== Background and release ==
Cash Cash first released "Overtime" on November 26, 2012, via their SoundCloud page for a free download. It was later released digitally on October 8, 2013, and appears on their EP of the same name. A remix to the single by Vicetone was released on May 12, 2014.

== Composition ==
"Overtime" was written by Jean Paul Makhlouf, Alex Makhlouf, Samuel Frisch, Dan Hartman and Solomon Olds, while production was handled by Cash Cash. The song has been described as an indie pop and electro house song. The song is a departure from their early neon pop punk sound showcased on their debut studio album Take It to the Floor, into an EDM sound, which the trio had been experimenting with on their previous album, The Beat Goes On.

== Critical reception ==
The song received positive reviews from music critics. EDM Sauce stated that the track has "a bit of an indie vibe to it, but overall it's just a happy feeling song." Complex noted that the song, "whirls with snazzy electro grooves, similarly using vocals to guide its path, with a back and forth in the beginning from distorted tones repeated to a chant that really makes you want to move. One of the tags on SoundCloud for this track is 'A Feeling That I Know So Well,' which represents the pivotal moment in this track where everything fades into the sultry vocals that sound like the lady that belted on Pink Floyd's Dark Side of the Moon and the female vocalist in The Funky Bunch combined."

== Chart performance ==
"Overtime" debuted on the US Hot Dance/Electronic Songs chart at number 48 on the week of June 7, 2014. The song peaked at number 39 and remained on the chart for eight weeks. In 2019, the song re-entered the Billboard charts at number 25 on the US Dance/Electronic Streamings Songs chart.

== Track listing ==
Digital download
No.	Title	Length
1.	"Overtime"	4:06

Digital download – radio edit
No.	Title	Length
1.	"Overtime" (radio edit)	3:21

Digital download – remixes
No.	Title	Length
1.	"Overtime" (Vicetone Remix Edit)	3:23
2.	"Overtime" (Vicetone Remix)	5:57

== Personnel ==
Credits for "Overtime" retrieved from album's liner notes.

- Jean Paul Makhlouf – vocals, mastering, programming, producer
- Alex Makhlouf – vocoder, backing vocals, mastering, programming, producer
- Samuel Frisch – mastering, programming, producer
- Loleatta Holloway – additional vocals

== Charts ==
Chart performance for "Overtime"
Chart (2014)	Peak position
US Hot Dance/Electronic Songs (Billboard)	39

== Release history ==
Release dates and formats for "Overtime"
Region	Date	Format	Label	Ref.
Various	October 8, 2013	Digital download; streaming	Big Beat	
