= Anyway (Cash Cash song) =

Single by Cash Cash featuring RuthAnne
- Released: January 13, 2023
- Genre: Dance pop
- Length: 2:48
- Label: Ultra
- Songwriters: Marco Daniel Borreo; Samuel Frisch; Jean Paul Makhlouf; Alex Makhlouf; Oliver John Marland; RuthAnne; Louis Schoorl
- Producer: Cash Cash

Cash Cash singles chronology
"Ride or Die" (2021)	"Anyway" (2023)	"Bleach (Move On)" (2023)

RuthAnne singles chronology
"Safe Place" (2021)	"Anyway" (2023)	"The Vow" (2023)

Music video
- "Anyway" (visualizer) on YouTube

"Anyway" is a song by American electronic music group Cash Cash. The song features Irish singer-songwriter RuthAnne and was released on January 13, 2023. It is the group's first release with Ultra Records. The song peaked at number two on the Billboard Dance Airplay chart and went number one on US dance radio.

== Background ==
On August 26, 2022, Cash Cash signed with Ultra Records, and released their first single under the label on January 13, 2023, titled "Anyway". It was also the band's first release since 2021, which Jean Paul Makhlouf said, "we had finished our previous record deal and were kind of in no man's land. We had to figure out what would be best for us and this is kind of the best of both worlds, because Ultra is part of Sony Music but it's also been such a moving force in dance for more than 30 years."

== Composition and lyrics ==
"Anyway" was written by Marco Daniel Borreo, Samuel Frisch, Jean Paul Makhlouf, Alex Makhlouf, Oliver John Marland, RuthAnne and Louis Schoorl, while production was handled by Cash Cash. About the song, the trio said "it'll remind you of that certain someone in your life that always has your back no matter what."

Musically, "Anyway" is a dance-pop song, featuring "catchy hooks" and "progressive melodies."

== Reception ==
"Anyway" was generally well received by music critics. Andrew Spada of Dancing Astronaut said the track was "a feel-good dance-pop crossover that is both emotive and upbeat with RuthAnne's vocals complementing Cash Cash's breezy progressive melodies." Carlie Belbin of EDM.com stated, "RuthAnne's soaring vocals complement the group's breezy sound design, which is as potent as ever." Wonderland Magazine remarked, "With an uplifting beat, pulsating synths, and RuthAnne's silky-smooth vocals, the track is pitch perfect."

== Chart performance ==
"Anyway" debuted at number 37 on the Billboard Dance Airplay chart. The song later jumped to number 12, before moving up to the number three spot, due to strong radio airplay and earned Cash Cash their ninth top ten single on the Dance Airplay chart. The song rose to number two on the chart where it would peak. It was also number one on US dance radio.

== Personnel ==
Credits for "Anyway" adapted from digital liner notes.

Cash Cash

- Jean Paul Makhlouf – composer, mastering, mixing, producer
- Alex Makhlouf – composer, mastering, mixing, producer
- Samuel Frisch – composer, mastering, mixing, producer

Additional musicians

- RuthAnne – composer, featured artist, vocals

== Charts ==
Chart performance for "Anyway"
Chart (2023)	Peak position
US Dance Airplay (Billboard)	2

== Release history ==
Release dates and formats for "Anyway"
Region	Date	Format	Label	Ref.
Various	January 13, 2023	Digital download; streaming	Ultra	
