= Broken Drum =

Single by Cash Cash featuring Fitz and the Tantrums

from the album Blood, Sweat & 3 Years
- Released: June 17, 2016
- Length: 3:18
- Label: Big Beat; Atlantic
- Songwriters: Samuel Frisch; Jean Paul Makhlouf; Alex Makhlouf; Michael Fitzpatrick
- Producer: Cash Cash

Cash Cash singles chronology
| "Millionaire" (2016) | "Broken Drum" (2016) | "Matches" (2017) |

Fitz and the Tantrums singles chronology
| "HandClap" (2016) | "Broken Drum" (2016) | "Roll Up" (2016) |

Music video
- "Broken Drum" on YouTube

"Broken Drum" is a song by American electronic music group Cash Cash. The song was released on June 17, 2016, as the fourth and final single from their fourth studio album Blood, Sweat & 3 Years. It features guest vocals from Michael Fitzpatrick from Fitz and the Tantrums.

The song peaked at number 44 on the US Hot Dance/Electronic Songs chart and reached the Russia Radio Airplay chart at number 120.

== Background and composition ==
"Broken Drum" was written by Samuel Frisch, Jean Paul Makhlouf, Alex Makhlouf and Michael Fitzpatrick while production was handled by the group themselves. According to Jean Paul Makhlouf, the song was "one of those super simple ditties" where the group avoided overthinking while recording the track. Michael Fitzpatrick described the collaboration as "mutual" and "knew this song was going to be fire" soon after recording. Lyrically, the song is about a post-relationship longing. Musically, the song has been described as a "tropical-tinged, saxophone-lead" track.

== Music video ==
The music video for "Broken Drum" premiered on June 17, 2016. It was filmed at the Marquee Nightclub in Las Vegas, Nevada, over Memorial Day Weekend. Directed by Joe Zohar, the video shows the group riding through the desert on the way to Las Vegas where the group picks up a lost saxophone player. It also features cameo appearances from Wiz Khalifa and Busta Rhymes.

Jean Paul Makhlouf said of the video: "We've been Marquee [Dayclub & Nightclub] residents for a few years now and felt like it was about time we show people what goes down out here when we're in town [...] the video showcases some of the most breath taking Vegas views that most people might not even know exist out there."

== Track listing ==
Digital download
| No. | Title | Length |
|---|---|---|
| 1. | "Broken Drum" (feat. Fitz of Fitz and the Tantrums) | 3:18 |

Digital download – extended mix
| No. | Title | Length |
|---|---|---|
| 1. | "Broken Drum" (feat. Fitz of Fitz and the Tantrums) (extended mix) | 5:05 |

== Credits and personnel ==
Credits for "Broken Drum" adapted from AllMusic and album's liner notes.

Cash Cash

- Jean Paul Makhlouf – composer, mastering, mixing, producer
- Alex Makhlouf – composer, mastering, mixing, producer
- Samuel Frisch – composer, mastering, mixing, producer

Additional musicians

- Michael Fitzpatrick – composer, featured artist, vocals

== Charts ==
Chart performance for "Broken Drum"
| Chart (2016) | Peak position |
|---|---|
| CIS Airplay (TopHit) | 89 |
| Russia Airplay (Tophit) | 120 |
| US Hot Dance/Electronic Songs (Billboard) | 44 |

== Release history ==
Release dates and formats for "Broken Drum"
| Region | Date | Format(s) | Label | Ref. |
|---|---|---|---|---|
| Various | June 17, 2016 | Digital download; streaming | Big Beat | |
