= Surrender (Cash Cash song) =

Single by Cash Cash featuring Julia Michaels

from the album Blood, Sweat & 3 Years
- Released: September 16, 2014
- Genre: EDM; progressive house
- Length: 3:28
- Label: Big Beat; Atlantic
- Songwriter(s): Frisch; A. Makhlouf; J. Makhlouf; Tal Meltzer; Julia Michaels; Philip Patterson; Lindy Robbins; Linus Wiklund
- Producer(s): Cash Cash

Cash Cash singles chronology
"Lightning" (2014)	"Surrender" (2014)	"Untouchable" (2015)

"Surrender" is a song by American electronic music group Cash Cash, featuring uncredited guest vocals from American singer Julia Michaels, and was released on September 16, 2014. It was included in their fourth studio album Blood, Sweat & 3 Years, released on June 24, 2016. The song went number one on dance radio and has garnered six million streams. The song sold 12,000 copies in September 2014.

== Background and composition ==
JP Makhlouf, one of the members of Cash Cash, said that "Working on this song brought out a lot of incredible emotions." While the title may refer to the act of giving act, Jean Paul of Cash Cash has stated that "Surrendering is usually seen as something negative or a sign of defeat, but this song shows a different side of things. Sometimes it’s the fight that kills you. Sometimes you don’t even know what you’re fighting for. Sometimes surrendering can set you free!" The track clocks at 3 minutes 28 seconds and features the vocal by Julia Michaels.

"Surrender" was promoted by the group through a Twitter campaign, #SurrenderToCashCash. The group encouraged fans to change their Twitter profile pictures to white flags to mirror the single's cover art. Fans who tweeted the hashtag may be tweeted, followed, or even have their Twitter profile "taken over" by the group.

In October 2014, American electronic duo Tritonal released a remix to the track. On March 30, 2015, Cash Cash performed an acoustic version of "Surrender" accompanied by a string section on VH1's "Big Morning Buzz Live."

== Reception ==
Nylon has described that the song is infectious and shows maturity despite its youthful sounds. Idolator stated that "their winning formula of hearty female vocals that float over a throbbing, synth-laden beat...is a fun reminder of those sun-drenched summer memories." Entertainment Weekly said that "Surrender" is "original, infectious, vibrant." Earmilk meanwhile wrote that it "catches the ear immediately, is light, bubbly, interesting."

Noah Galloway used it in his final dance during the season 20 of Dancing with the Stars, on May 19, 2015.

== Music video ==
The lyric video for "Surrender" was released on October 7, 2014, while the official music video premiered on January 15, 2015. The music video was directed by Roy Raz.

== Track listing ==
Digital download
No.	Title	Length
1.	"Surrender"	3:28

Tritonal remix
No.	Title	Length
1.	"Surrender" (Radio edit)	3:12

== Charts ==
=== Weekly charts ===
Chart (2014–2015)	Peak position
South Korea International Chart (GAON)	99
US Hot Dance/Electronic Songs (Billboard)	19
US Pop Airplay (Billboard)	37

=== Year-end charts ===
Chart (2014)	Position
US Hot Dance/Electronic Songs (Billboard)	97
Chart (2015)	Position
US Hot Dance/Electronic Songs (Billboard)	77
