= Overtime (EP) =

EP by Cash Cash
- Released: October 29, 2013
- Genre: EDM; pop
- Length: 26:33
- Label: Big Beat
- Producer: Cash Cash

Cash Cash chronology
The Beat Goes On (2012)	Overtime (2013)	Lightning (2014)

Singles from Overtime
- 1. "Overtime" Released: November 26, 2012; 2. "Take Me Home" Released: July 15, 2013

Overtime is the second extended play recorded by American electronic music group Cash Cash released on October 29, 2013, through Big Beat. The EP was made available for streaming exclusively via Dancing Astronaut on October 28, 2013.

== Background ==
Speaking about the new sound for the EP, member Jean Paul Makhlouf said;

"It's a fresh sounding EP. We tried some new stuff with it and are very proud of the way it turned out. There's a good balance between electronic breaks and pop hooks. We did this really cool thing with kid gang vocals in 'Overtime', 'Satellites', and 'Kiss The Sky'. It kinda connected those 3 songs. The female vocals on 'Take Me Home', 'Here and Now', and 'Hideaway' brought those three together. It made for a very cohesive EP that we are really excited about."

To support the EP, the group announced a North American tour that began in October 2013.

== Singles ==
"Overtime" was released in November 26, 2012, as the first single from the EP. It was released for a free download on SoundCloud before being released digitally on streaming services on October 8, 2013. The song peaked at number 39 on the Billboard Dance/Electronic Songs chart. The song also entered the Billboard Dance/Electronic Streaming Songs chart at number 25 in 2019, 7 years after its initial release. "Take Me Home" was released on July 15, 2013, as the second single from the EP and features American singer-songwriter Bebe Rexha. The song peaked at number 57 on the Billboard Hot 100 and sold 488,000 downloads in the US to date according to Nielsen SoundScan. The song was certified platinum by RIAA in June 2017.

== Critical reception ==
Complex called the EP, "a fun, upbeat, blended sound, with strong vocal tracks, pop melodies, and electro-house stomping beats that come together in a fluid and enjoyable collection of songs." Eric Zwilling of Dancing Astronaut stated that the group showcases "the musicianship of the group through careful manipulation and sampling of the vocals." He also praised songs such as "Take Me Home" and "Kiss the Sky".

== Overtime EP Remixes ==
The Overtime EP Remixes is a digital exclusive. It was released on June 17, 2014, and features three remixes of "Overtime", and a remix of "Satellites" and "Take Me Home".

Overtime EP Remixes
No.	Title	Length
1.	"Overtime" (Vicetone Remix)	5:57
2.	"Overtime" (Vicetone Remix Edit)	3:23
3.	"Satellites" (Qulinez Remix) (Radio Edit)	3:26
4.	"Overtime" (Candyland & DotEXE Remix)	4:20
5.	"Take Me Home" (featuring Bebe Rexha) (Patrick Hagenaar Colour Code Remix)	6:37

== Track listing ==
Digital download
No.	Title	Length
1.	"Take Me Home" (featuring Bebe Rexha)	3:26
2.	"Overtime"	4:06
3.	"Hideaway"	3:58
4.	"Satellites"	4:21
5.	"Here and Now" (featuring Kerli)	3:53
6.	"Kiss the Sky"	3:45
7.	"Take Me Home" (featuring Bebe Rexha) (Acoustic)	3:04
Total length:		26:33

== Personnel ==
Credits for Overtime adapted from liner notes.

Cash Cash

- Jean Paul Makhlouf – vocals, DJ
- Alex Makhlouf – keyboards, DJ
- Samuel Frisch – DJ

Additional musicians

- Kerli – featured artist (track 5)
- Bebe Rexha – featured artist, vocals (track 1, 7)
- Loleatta Holloway – additional vocals (track 2)

Production

- Jean Paul Makhlouf – producer, mastering, mixing, recording
- Alex Makhlouf – producer, mastering, mixing, recording
- Samuel Frisch – producer, mastering, mixing, recording

== Charts ==
Chart performance for Overtime
Chart (2013)	Peak position
US Top Dance/Electronic Albums (Billboard)	11
US Heatseekers Albums (Billboard)	30
