= How to Love (Cash Cash song) =

Single by Cash Cash featuring Sofía Reyes

from the album Blood, Sweat & 3 Years
- Released: April 29, 2016
- Length: 3:39
- Label: Big Beat
- Songwriters: Ilsey Juber; Jennifer Decilveo; Jean Paul Makhlouf; Alex Makhlouf; Samuel Frisch
- Producer: Cash Cash

Cash Cash featuring Sofía Reyes singles chronology
"Aftershock" (2016)	"How to Love" (2016)	"Millionaire" (2016)

Sofía Reyes singles chronology
"Solo Yo" (2016)	"How to Love" (2016)	"Llegaste Tú" (2016)

Music video
- "How to Love" on YouTube

"How to Love" is a song by American electronic music group Cash Cash. It was released on April 29, 2016 as the second single from their fourth studio album, Blood, Sweat & 3 Years and features Mexican singer and songwriter Sofía Reyes. A digital remix EP of "How to Love" was released on May 27, 2016.

== Composition and lyrics ==
"How to Love" was written by Ilsey Juber, Jennifer Decilveo, brothers Jean Paul and Alex Makhlouf and Samuel Frisch while production was handled by the group. The song has been described as "upbeat" and "tropical" with influences of house, folk, and blues music and lyrics that are considered "super relatable." Speaking about the song, group member Samuel Frisch stated, "It’s hard to maintain relationships, even just friendships. You start to miss the people you love and care about." JP Makhlouf spoke about working with Sofía Reyes stating, "She was the best and easiest to work." According to Reyes, the song was finished within hours.

== Reception ==
Billboard called the track, "a sun-kissed summer jam featuring rich, playful vocals from rising Mexican singer/songwriter Sofía Reyes. It’s youthful and enchanting, somehow energetic and soothing all at the same time." Dancing Astronaut stated that the song is, "a summer-ready jam."

== Music video ==
The music video for "How to Love" premiered on April 29, 2016 and was filmed in Los Angeles. The video was directed by Roboshobo and was shot in one day.

== Track listings ==
Digital download
No.	Title	Length
1.	"How to Love"	3:39

Remixes EP
No.	Title	Length
1.	"How to Love" (Arty remix)	3:16
2.	"How to Love" (Hellberg remix)	3:22
3.	"How to Love" (Boombox Cartel remix)	2:48
4.	"How to Love" (Fawks flip)	4:07
5.	"How to Love" (Fawks.i_o remix)	4:21

== Personnel ==
Credits for "How to Love" adapted from AllMusic.

- Jean Paul Makhlouf – composer, producer
- Alex Makhlouf – composer, producer
- Samuel Frisch – composer, producer
- Sofía Reyes – featured artist, vocals

== Charts ==
=== Weekly charts ===
Weekly chart performance for "How to Love"
Chart (2016)	Peak position
South Korea International Chart (GAON)	24
US Hot Dance/Electronic Songs (Billboard)	16

=== Year-end charts ===
Year-end chart performance for "How to Love"
Chart (2016)	Position
US Hot Dance/Electronic Songs (Billboard)	56
