= Love or Lust (album) =

Studio album by Cash Cash
- Released: April 19, 2011
- Genre: Dance; electronica; synthpop
- Length: 35:54
- Label: Cash Cash (US); Twilight (Japan)
- Producer: Cash Cash

Cash Cash chronology
| Take It to the Floor (2008) | Love or Lust (2011) | The Beat Goes On (2012) |

Singles from Love or Lust
- 1. "Victim of Love" Released: April 5, 2011; 2. "Sexin' on the Dance Floor" Released: June 7, 2011

Love or Lust is the second studio album by American band Cash Cash, released on April 19, 2011. "Victim of Love" was released as the album's first single on April 5, 2011. "Sexin' on the Dance Floor," "Naughty or Nice," and "Jersey Girl" were featured on MTV's Jersey Shore and The Real World. This was the last album to feature drummer Anthony Villacari, as he left the group that year due to creative differences.

== Background ==
Speaking about the album, lead singer Jean Paul Makhlouf said,

"The album contains songs about love, hate, lust, and obsession. In a weird, messed up way, I think all those themes are connected and need to be used in moderation. Too much of any of them will probably end your relationship or drive you insane, but too little will most likely do the same. You can't have love without hate, and you'll never appreciate what it means to be madly in love. Love without lust or small amounts of obsession gets super stale."

The album was recorded in their home studio in Roseland, New Jersey. The album is described as dance, synthetic and techno. Tracks such as "Sexin' On The Dance Floor" and "One Night Stand" are described as dance, while "Jersey Girl" is callback to their home state. "I Have One Regret" presents a serious side to the album.

"Victim of Love" was released as the lead single from the album on April 5, 2011. The song peaked at number two on the iTunes Dance chart hours after its release. A song remix was released on April 26, and was included as a bonus track for the album. The second single, "Sexin' on the Dance Floor" was released on June 7. The song features vocals from Villacari's sister, ADG. The album reached number two on the iTunes Dance chart.

== Critical reception ==
Time Out called the album "as generic as they come, all Eurodance beats, faux-sleazy R&B and vocoder vocals."

== Track listing ==
All tracks are written by Cash Cash, except where noted

Standard edition
| No. | Title | Writer(s) | Length |
|---|---|---|---|
| 1. | "Victim of Love" | | 3:22 |
| 2. | "Naughty or Nice (featuring ADG)" | Jean Paul Makhlouf, Alex Makhlouf, Samuel Frisch, Anthony Villacari, Robopop | 3:06 |
| 3. | "Sexin' on the Dance Floor (featuring ADG)" | | 3:17 |
| 4. | "Jersey Girl" | JP Makhlouf, A Makhlouf, Frisch, Villacari, Robopop | 3:36 |
| 5. | "Wasted Love" | JP Makhlouf, A Makhlouf, Frisch, Villacari, Robopop | 3:18 |
| 6. | "One Night Stand" | | 3:14 |
| 7. | "Dirty Lovin'" | | 3:03 |
| 8. | "I Have One Regret" | | 4:42 |
| 9. | "Jaw Drop" | JP Makhlouf, A Makhlouf, Frisch, Villacari, Denis Lipari, Mitchy Collins | 3:35 |
| 10. | "Obsessed" | | 4:41 |
| Total length: | | | 35:54 |

Bonus track
| No. | Title | Length |
|---|---|---|
| 11. | "Victim of Love (Suareasy Remix)" | 3:44 |
| 12. | "Can't Stop Looking (DJ FBomb Remix)" | 3:53 |
| Total length: | | 43:49 |

== Personnel ==
Credits for Love or Lust adapted from liner notes.

- Jean Paul Makhlouf – vocals, guitar, producer, recording, mixing, mastering
- Alex Luke Makhlouf – keyboard, backing vocals, producer, programming, recording
- Sam Frisch – guitar, bass, backing vocals, artwork, layout, producer (track 8)
- Anthony Villacari – drums
- ADG – vocals for "Naughty or Nice" and "Sexin' on the Dance Floor"
- Blake Healy – additional producer (track 3)

== Charts ==
Chart performance for Love or Lust
| Chart (2011) | Peak position |
|---|---|
| Japanese Albums (Oricon) | 169 |

== Release history ==
Release history and formats for Love or Lust
| Region | Date | Edition | Format | Label | Ref. |
|---|---|---|---|---|---|
| Various | April 19, 2011 | Standard | Digital download | Digital Heart Beat Music | |
| Japan | April 19, 2011 | Bonus track | CD | Twilight | |
| Japan | May 11, 2011 | Bonus track | Digital download | Twilight | |
