= Jacquie Lee =

American singer and songwriter

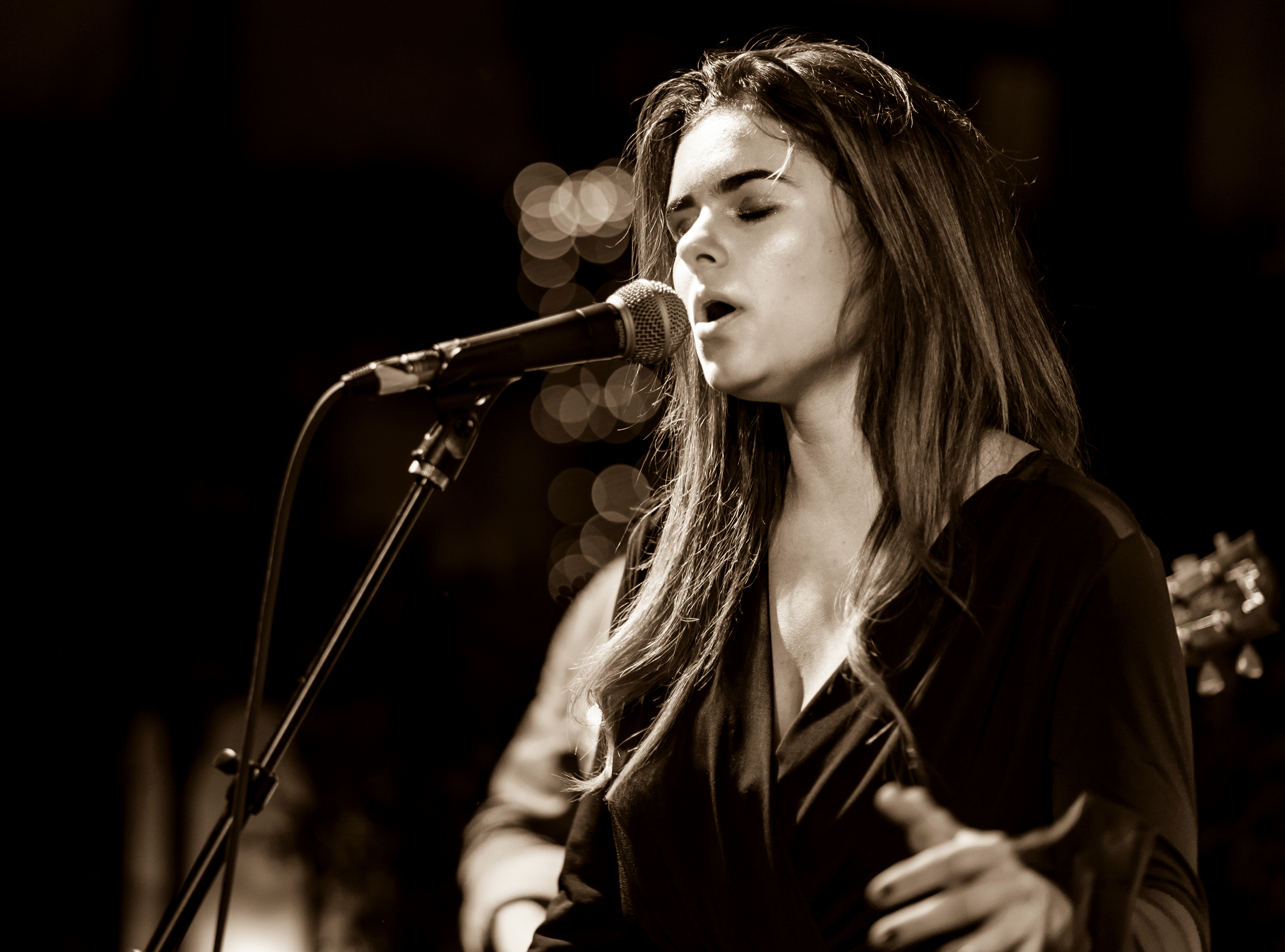
- Lee performing in 2017

Background information
- Born: Jacqueline Ann Lee; June 25, 1997 (age 29); Colts Neck Township, New Jersey, U.S.
- Genres: Pop; blues rock; country; soul
- Occupations: Singer; songwriter
- Instruments: Vocals; piano
- Years active: 2013–present
- Labels: Atlantic; Steel Wool

Jacqueline Ann "Jacquie" Lee (born June 25, 1997) is an American singer and songwriter from Colts Neck, New Jersey. She is best known for being the runner-up of season five of NBC's singing competition The Voice in 2013 as part of Christina Aguilera's team and as a solo artist signed to Atlantic Records. As of 2017, Lee started releasing music mononymously under her given name, Jacquie.

== Early life ==
Lee was born in Colts Neck Township, New Jersey to parents Denise and Richard Lee. She attended Ranney School in Tinton Falls, New Jersey and has two siblings: an older sister named Nicole and a younger brother named Richie, who attends Cedar Drive Middle School. She has Italian ancestry.

== Career ==
=== 2013: The Voice ===
At the blind auditions on September 24, 2013, Lee performed Amy Winehouse's "Back to Black," persuading Christina Aguilera and Blake Shelton to turn their chairs. Lee chose Aguilera and remained on her team the entire season. In the Battle rounds, Lee was paired with Briana Cuoco where they sang the song "House of the Rising Sun," and advanced. During the Knockout round, Lee sang "Stompa" by Serena Ryder against Anthony Paul and Christina selected her to move on to the Live Playoffs, sending Paul home. Lee continued through the Live Rounds and during the Top 5, got an iTunes bonus for reaching the Top 10 overall songs with her studio version of "Angel" by Sarah McLachlan. In the Finals, Lee again received an iTunes bonus from reaching the No. 9 position with her recording of the Jennifer Holliday song "And I Am Telling You I'm Not Going." On December 17, 2013 she was declared to have come in 2nd place behind winner Tessanne Chin.

– Studio version of performance reached the top 10 on iTunes

Stage	Song	Original Artist	Date	Order	Result
Blind Audition	"Back to Black"	Amy Winehouse	September 24, 2013	2.1	Christina Aguilera and Blake Shelton turned Joined Team Christina
Battle Rounds	"The House of the Rising Sun" (vs. Briana Cuoco)	Traditional	October 14, 2013	7.6	Saved by Coach
Knockout Rounds	"Stompa" (vs. Anthony Paul)	Serena Ryder	October 28, 2013	11.4	Saved by Coach
Live Playoffs	"I Put a Spell on You"	Screamin' Jay Hawkins	November 5, 2013	14.10	Saved by Public Vote
Live Top 12	"Love Is Blindness"	U2	November 11, 2013	16.5	Saved by Public Vote
Live Top 10	"Clarity"	Zedd	November 18, 2013	18.2	Saved by Public Vote
Live Top 8	"Who's Lovin' You"	The Miracles	November 25, 2013	20.8	Saved by Public Vote
Live Top 6	"Cry Baby"	Garnet Mimms	December 2, 2013	22.6	Saved by Public Vote
Live Top 6	"The Voice Within"	Christina Aguilera	December 2, 2013	22.11	Saved by Public Vote
Live Top 5 (Semi-finals)	"Angel"	Sarah McLachlan	December 9, 2013	24.3	Saved by Public Vote
Live Finale	"Back to Black"	Amy Winehouse	December 16, 2013	26.3	Runner-up
Live Finale	"We Remain" (with Christina Aguilera)	Christina Aguilera	December 16, 2013	26.5	Runner-up
Live Finale	"And I Am Telling You I'm Not Going"	Jennifer Holliday	December 16, 2013	26.9	Runner-up

=== 2014–present: After The Voice and Broken Ones EP ===
After the show, Lee was signed to Lyor Cohen's Label, 300 Entertainment, in partnership with Atlantic Records. She performed her debut single, "Broken Ones," on the Top 5 Results of season 6 of The Voice on May 13, 2014. This was the first time the song was performed and her first time returning to the show since being a contestant. The song was released to iTunes the same day. It was written by Dana Parish and Andy Hollander. Although the song did not enter the Billboard Hot 100, it managed to peak at number 36 on the Pop Digital Songs.

Lee also took part in The Voice Summer Tour 2014, a summer tour starting on June 21 in San Antonio, Texas and concluding in Redmond, Washington on August 2, 2014. She was joined by winner Tessanne Chin, finalist Will Champlin, season 1's runner-up Dia Frampton, along with season 6 Winner Josh Kaufman, runner-up Jake Worthington, and third place finalist Christina Grimmie. She was also joined by Kristen Merlin, a Top 5 finalist, and Jake Barker, a top 20 finalist.

It was announced on September 29 that Lee would be releasing her 'Broken Ones' EP on October 21, 2014 and an iTunes pre-order was available on October 6. A lyric video for "Tears Fall" was premiered on October 10 on MTV.

On April 20, 2015, the official music video for "Tears Fall" was exclusively premiered on MTV. The video was filmed at Zsa Zsa Gabor's mansion in Los Angeles, and was directed by Blair Waters.

In early 2016, Lee was featured on Cash Cash's single, "Aftershock", which premiered on January 29, 2016.

Lee released a digital EP, The Only One, in late 2017. At this point, she started simply going by Jacquie, as opposed to Jacquie Lee.

She followed that up with two digital EPs in 2020, Infinity and Rinascita.

After working on early demos, Lee was cast as the singing voice of Tiera Skovbye's character, Polly Cooper, on the project Riverdale, with the episode "Chapter Ninety-Four: Next to Normal".

In 2026, Lee appeared as a contestant on the 24th season of American Idol. However, her appearance was absent during the 'Ohana Round' episode, stating that she was eliminated in the series.

== Influences ==
Lee has cited her coach, Christina Aguilera, as a major influence. She has referenced Aguilera as she stated, "[I]t was really surreal, and it was a dream come true because I always idolized her from the start." Lee has also cited Michael Jackson, Jackson 5, Nirvana and Lana Del Rey as influences.

== Discography ==
=== Soundtrack albums ===
List of albums, with selected chart positions
Title	Details	Peak chart positions	
Riverdale: Special Episode – Next to Normal: The Musical	Released: September 30, 2021; Formats: CD, digital download; Label: WaterTower Music	—	—
"—" denotes releases that did not chart or were not released in that territory.

=== Extended plays ===
Title	Album details	Peak chart positions	
Title	Album details	US Current	US Heat
Broken Ones	Release date: October 21, 2014; Label: Atlantic, 300; Formats: Digital download, EP	193	12
The Only One	Release date: November 17, 2017; Label: Steel Wool Records; Formats: Digital download, EP	—	—
Infinity	Release date: January 10, 2020; Label: Steel Wool Records; Formats: Digital download, EP	—	—
Rinascita	Release date: December 30, 2020; Label: Steel Wool Records; Formats: Digital download, EP	—	—
Protect My Peace	Release date: November 10, 2022; Label: Steel Wool Records; Formats: Digital download, EP	—	—
Hereditary	Release date: August 21, 2024; Label: Independent; Formats: Digital download, EP	—	—

=== Singles ===
==== As lead artist ====
Title	Year	Peak chart positions	Album
Title	Year	US	Album
"Broken Ones"	2014	— (Note: "Broken Ones" did not enter the Billboard Hot 100, but did peak at 36 on the Pop Digital Songs sales chart.)	Broken Ones
"Tears Fall"	2015	—	Broken Ones
"Somebody's Angel"	2016	—	Non-album single
"Am I the Only One"	2017	—	The Only One
"California Dreaming"	2017	—	The Only One
"For You"	2017	—	The Only One
"I Won't Break"	2018	—	Non-album single
"They Don't Even Know My Name"	2018	—	Hurricane Bianca: From Russia with Hate Soundtrack
"Grim" (featuring bLAck pARty)	2019	—	Infinity
"Break"	2019	—	Infinity
"Forever"	2020	—	Infinity
"Geppetto"	2020	—	Non-album single
"Red"	2020	—	Rinascita
"Chances"	2020	—	Rinascita
"PSSY PWR" (with Jean Deaux)	2020	—	Rinascita
"Five Two"	2021	—	Non-album single
"I'm a Bitch"	2021	—	Non-album single
"Contour"	2021	—	Non-album single
"Wycmf"	2022	—	Non-album single
"Snowman"	2022	—	Protect My Peace
"Porcellana"	2024	—	Hereditary
"Blade of Grass"	2024	—	Hereditary
"Hell Or High Water"	2024	—	Hereditary
"Hereditary"	2024	—	Hereditary
"Life Goes On"	2025	—	Non-album single
"Pray For Me"	2025	—	Non-album single
"You've Got Time"	2025	—	Non-album single

==== As featured artist ====
Title	Year	Peak chart positions	Album
Title	Year	US	Album
"Aftershock" (Cash Cash featuring Jacquie Lee)	2016	— (Note: "Aftershock" did not enter the Billboard Hot 100, but did peak at 34 on the Dance/Mix Show Airplay chart.)	Blood, Sweat & 3 Years
"I'm Done" (J.Kelr featuring Jacquie Lee)	2018	—	Corinthian Cadillac
"Eden 2.0" (NoMBe featuring slenderbodies, Jacquie & Geneva White)	2019	—	Non-album single

==== Promotional singles ====
Title	Year	Peak chart positions	Album
Title	Year	US	Album
"It's Our World"	2015	— (Note: "It's Our World" did not enter the Billboard Hot 100, but did peak at 3 on the Kid Digital Songs sales chart.)	Disneynature: Monkey Kingdom

=== Other appearances ===
List of non-single guest appearances, with other performing artists, showing year released and album name
Year	Title	Other artist(s)	Album	Ref.
2021	"Just Another Day"	Lili Reinhart, Mädchen Amick and Tyson Ritter	Riverdale: Special Episode – Next to Normal: The Musical	
2021	"Everything Else"	Lili Reinhart and Mädchen Amick	Riverdale: Special Episode – Next to Normal: The Musical	
2021	"It's Gonna Be Good"	Lili Reinhart, Mädchen Amick and Tyson Ritter	Riverdale: Special Episode – Next to Normal: The Musical	
2021	"I'm Alive"	Tyson Ritter	Riverdale: Special Episode – Next to Normal: The Musical	
2021	"I Am the One"	Lili Reinhart and Tyson Ritter	Riverdale: Special Episode – Next to Normal: The Musical	

== Releases from The Voice ==
Title	Album details	Peak chart positions	
Title	Album details	US	US Heat
The Complete Season 5 Collection	Release date: December 17, 2013; Label: Republic Records; Formats: Digital download	—	15

Single	Peak chart positions					Original artist
Single	US	US Heat	US Digital	US Rock	CAN	Original artist
"I Put a Spell on You"	116	22	54	—	—	Screamin' Jay Hawkins
"Love Is Blindness"	—	—	65	27	—	U2
"Angel"	87	11	29	—	75	Sarah McLachlan
"—" denotes releases that did not chart
