= Michael Jackson (The Beat Goes On) =

Single by Cash Cash

from the album The Beat Goes On
- Released: July 11, 2012
- Genre: Dance-pop; electropop
- Length: 3:45
- Label: Spinnin'
- Songwriter(s): Cash Cash
- Producer(s): Cash Cash

Cash Cash singles chronology
"Sexin' on the Dance Floor" (2011)	"Michael Jackson (The Beat Goes On)" (2012)	"I Like it Loud" (2012)

"Michael Jackson (The Beat Goes On)" is a song by American electronic music group Cash Cash. It was released as the lead single on July 11, 2012, from their third studio album, The Beat Goes On. It was released through Spinnin' Records.

== Composition and lyrics ==
"Michael Jackson (The Beat Goes On)" pays tribute to American singer Michael Jackson. The song incorporates lyrics from Jackson's biggest hits and showcases a different direction for the band musically which features a lot more electronic effects and less guitar. Speaking about their change in sound, Jean Paul Makhlouf said that it "isn’t a radical departure" and "more of an evolution." He stated, "It’s a lot heavier electro-wise. The beats are better and the hooks are more defined. It’s a mix of our Cash Cash electro dance vibe blended with some dubstep shock bundled with a pop anthem chorus."

== Lyric video ==
A lyric video for "Michael Jackson (The Beat Goes On)" was released on July 16, 2012 and garnered 2 million views in 6 months.

== Chart performance ==
"Michael Jackson (The Beat Goes On)" received airplay in Japan and the Netherlands. The song peaked at number 8 on the Dance Top 30 chart along with spending five weeks on the Dutch Top 40 chart peaking at number 24.

== Track listing ==
Digital single
No.	Title	Length
1.	"Michael Jackson (The Beat Goes On)"	3:45
2.	"Michael Jackson (The Beat Goes On)" (Extended Mix)	6:08
3.	"Michael Jackson (The Beat Goes On)" (Uptempo Mix)	4:33

== Charts ==
=== Weekly charts ===
Weekly chart performance for "Michael Jackson"
Chart (2012–13)	Peak position
Belgium (Ultratip Bubbling Under Wallonia)	28
France (SNEP)	79
Hungary (Rádiós Top 40)	19
Netherlands (Dutch Top 40)	24
Netherlands (Single Top 100)	25

=== Year-end charts ===
Year-end chart performance for "Michael Jackson"
Chart (2012)	Position
Netherlands (Dutch Top 40)	140
