= The Beat Goes On (Cash Cash album) =

Studio album by Cash Cash
- Released: September 7, 2012
- Genre: Dance; electronica; electropop
- Length: 38:39
- Label: Cash Cash; Spinnin'; Twilight
- Producer: Cash Cash

Cash Cash chronology
Love or Lust (2011)	The Beat Goes On (2012)	Overtime (2013)

Singles from The Beat Goes On
- 1. "Michael Jackson (The Beat Goes On)" Released: July 11, 2012; 2. "I Like It Loud" Released: September 7, 2012

The Beat Goes On is the third studio album by electronic music group Cash Cash. The full-length version was only licensed in Japan and the EP version was self-released worldwide on Cash Cash Music. It was released on September 7, 2012, and both formats contained the two songs "Michael Jackson (The Beat Goes On)" and "I Like It Loud," which were also soon after released as singles by Dutch independent dance label Spinnin' Records.

== Background ==
Cash Cash released The Beat Goes On as an 11-song LP in Japan, but as a 6-song EP in every other country. "Michael Jackson (The Beat Goes On)" was released as the lead single from the album on July 11, 2012. The song pays tribute to American singer Michael Jackson. The second single "I Like It Loud" was released on September 7. Lyric videos were released for both singles on Spinnin' Records.

Jean Paul Makhlouf described the album as "a lot heavier electro-wise." Despite the album being more dubstep leaning, Makhlouf stated that it "isn't a radical departure, but more of an evolution." He further explained stating their goal was to combine dubstep and pop music: "A lot of dubstep groups haven't found a way to make coherent pop songs, and I think we cracked the code with 'Michael Jackson'. We're taking the music in a wild direction."

The album's initial release was supposed to be on June 13, 2012, however due to some new distribution plans, the group rescheduled the release on September 7, 2012.

== Commercial performance ==
The Beat Goes On peaked at number 163 on the Japanese Albums chart. The single "Michael Jackson (The Beat Goes On)" received airplay in Japan and the Netherlands and reached number 8 on the Dance Top 30 chart along with spending five weeks on the Dutch Top 40 chart.

== Track listing ==
Japanese album edition
No.	Title	Length
1.	"Michael Jackson (The Beat Goes On)"	3:45
2.	"Still Got It"	3:16
3.	"Mama Told Me"	3:22
4.	"Get You Fast"	3:28
5.	"I Like It Loud"	3:14
6.	"Four Letter Word (featuring J.Trill)"	4:14
7.	"History"	3:02
8.	"Get Hyper"	3:10
9.	"Tongue Twister (featuring Bim)"	3:22
10.	"We Don't Sleep At Night (featuring Bim)"	3:34
11.	"One Last Song"	5:32
Total length:		38:39

EP edition
No.	Title	Length
1.	"Michael Jackson (The Beat Goes On)"	3:45
2.	"Still Got It"	3:16
3.	"Get You Fast"	3:28
4.	"I Like It Loud"	3:14
5.	"Michael Jackson (The Beat Goes On) [Extended Remix]"	6.08
6.	"I Like It Loud [Extended Remix]"	4:56
Total length:		24:47

== Charts ==
Chart performance for The Beat Goes On
Chart (2012)	Peak position
Japanese Albums (Oricon)	163

=== Singles ===
Year	Single	Peak chart positions		
Year	Single	BEL (Tip)	FRA	NLD
2012	"Michael Jackson (The Beat Goes On)"	28	79	25
2012	"I Like It Loud"	—	—	—
"—" denotes a recording that did not chart or was not released in that territory.

== Release history ==
Release history and formats for The Beat Goes On
Region	Date	Edition	Format	Label	Ref.
Japan	September 7, 2012	Standard	CD; Digital download	Twilight	
United States	September 7, 2012	Extended play	Digital download	Cash Cash Music	
Europe	September 7, 2012	Extended play	Digital download	Spinnin'	
