= Tritonal (group) =

American music duo

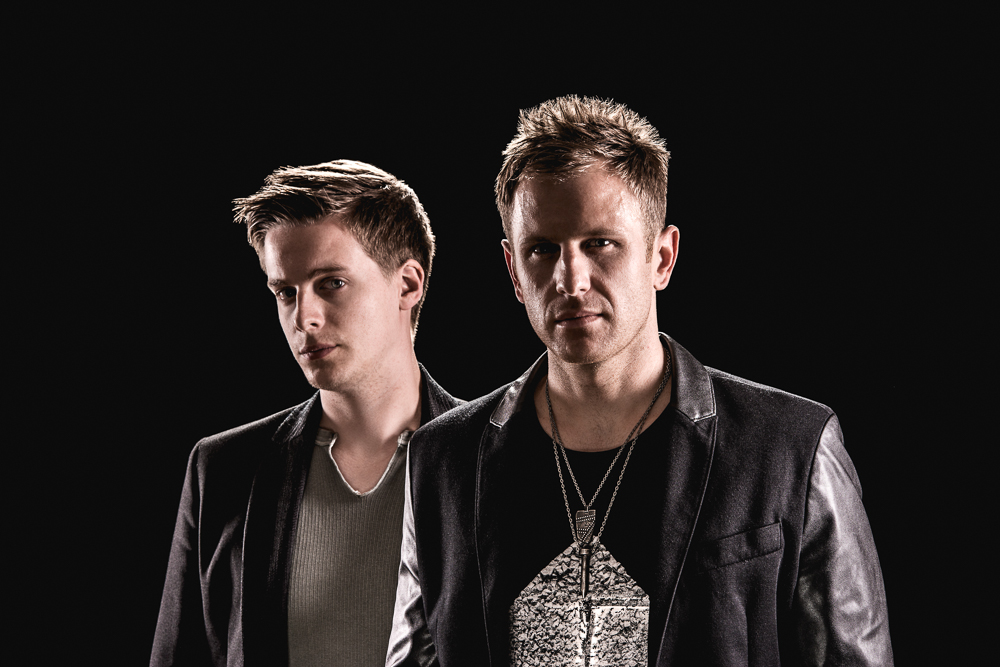
- Chad Cisneros and David Reed of Tritonal, 2013

Background information
- Origin: Austin, Texas, U.S.
- Genres: Pop; electro house; progressive house; future bass; trance
- Years active: 2008–present
- Labels: Enhanced Music; Air Up There Recordings; Flashover; Anjunabeats; Blackhole; Armada; Garuda; Coldharbour; Spinnin' Records; Astralwerks
- Members: Chad Cisneros; Dave Reed
- Website: www.tritonalmusic.com

Tritonal is an American DJ and music production duo from Austin, Texas consisting of producers and DJs Chad Cisneros and David Reed. They are also known for hosting the Tritonia radio show, broadcasting from SiriusXM BPM channel 52.

== Biography ==
Formed in 2008, Tritonal, the Texas-based production and DJ duo consisting of Chad Cisneros and Dave Reed, are #65 on DJ Mag's Top 100 DJs of 2012 and one of MTV Clubland's "10 Artists to Watch in 2013".

In their early years, they often collaborated with Austin-based vocalist Cristina Soto on their vocal tracks. They also hosted a trance radio show known as Air Up There.

In 2008, their track "Lights Over Austin" was featured on the Anjunabeats Volume Six compilation by Above & Beyond.

In 2010, Tritonal formed the now-defunct trance sub label Air Up There Recordings (named after their former radio show) under Enhanced Music. The first release was Hands to Hold Me by the duo with Cristina Soto.

Their 2011 debut artist album Piercing the Quiet produced eight top 20 Beatport singles, including five that held the #1 position on the trance chart for over three weeks. In September 2012, they released the remix album Piercing the Quiet Remixed, which landed in the top 5 on the iTunes dance albums chart.

After 100 episodes of their radio show Air Up There, they ended it with a sold out, live performance in their hometown of Austin, Texas. A new program called Tritonia aired on Sirius XM Electric Area, but now broadcasts Monday and Wednesday evenings from 11pm to midnight EST on SiriusXM BPM channel 51.

In 2013, Tritonal switched their style from trance to house, which was reflected in their 2013 and 2014 EP series entitled Metamorphic. The first EP, Metamorphic I, was released on March 25, with remixes of their track "Bullet That Saved Me" featuring Underdown released in April 2013. Also on April 16, 2013, Tritonal announced via social media that they would be joining Will Holland as co-owners and directors of Enhanced Music. Their sub label Air Up There Recordings had its last release on September 9, 2013.

As of January 2018, Tritonal have produced over 200 original productions and remixes and have been supported by other DJs like Armin van Buuren, Above & Beyond, Tiësto, Seven Lions, Steve Aoki, Nicky Romero, Cash Cash, Ferry Corsten, Markus Schulz, and more.

In 2013, they played festivals like Electric Daisy Carnival, Escape From Wonderland, Ultra Music Festival, Electric Zoo Festival, and Creamfields Australia. In Summer 2013, Tritonal embarked on a major, 40+ city tour throughout North America. In 2015, their song "Untouchable" with Cash Cash made Billboard's Year-End Top 100 for Dance/Electronic songs.

In 2016, they released their sophomore artist album Painting with Dreams. In April 2019 they recorded and released their educational music production course where they teach aspiring music producers the techniques they use to create their music Their third studio album, U & Me, was released in June 2019.

== Discography ==
=== Studio albums ===
- 2011 Piercing the Quiet (Enhanced Recordings)
- 2016 Painting With Dreams (Enhanced Recordings)
- 2019 U & Me (Enhanced Recordings)
- 2021 Reverence
- 2022 Coalesce

=== Extended plays ===
- 2008 Lights Over Austin / Northern Aura (Anjunabeats)
- 2008 Somnium / Photographique (Enhanced Recordings)
- 2009 Evangelia / Sephoria (Fraction Records)
- 2009 Forever (Levare Recordings)
- 2009 Kinetik (Stellar Sounds)
- 2010 Suede / Sideswing (Garuda Records)
- 2013 Metamorphic I (Enhanced Recordings)
- 2013 Metamorphic II (Enhanced Recordings)
- 2014 Metamorphic III (Enhanced Recordings)

=== Compilations ===
- 2010 Enhanced Sessions Volume Two (with Ferry Tayle)
- 2013 Tritonia Chapter 001
- 2015 Tritonia Chapter 002

=== Singles ===
- 2008 "Essence of Kea" (Levare Recordings)
- 2008 "Eternal Radiance" (System Recordings)
- 2008 "Organic Interface" (Fraction Records)
- 2008 "Walk with Me" (featuring Cristina Soto) (Coldharbour Recordings)
- 2009 "Cloudbase" (Levare Recordings)
- 2009 "I Can Feel" (Levare Recordings)
- 2009 "Crash Into Reason" (featuring Cristina Soto) (Coldharbour Recordings)
- 2009 "Daybreak" (featuring Cristina Soto) (Coldharbour Recordings)
- 2009 "Invincible Sun" (featuring Cristina Soto) (S107 Recordings)
- 2009 "Jump Off" (featuring Hannah Sky) (In Trance We Trust)
- 2009 "Let Solitude" (featuring Cristina Soto) (Flashover Recordings)
- 2009 "Lunarium" (featuring Cristina Soto) (Alter Ego Records)
- 2009 "Piercing Quiet" (featuring Cristina Soto) (Flashover Recordings)
- 2009 "Sky Nights" (Fraction Records)
- 2009 "What I Say" (AVA Recordings)
- 2009 "Spellbound" (Coldharbour Recordings)
- 2010 "Driftoff" (Levare Recordings)
- 2010 "Audio Rush" (Fraction Records)
- 2010 "Forgive Me, Forget You" (featuring Cristina Soto) (Premier)
- 2010 "Hands to Hold Me" (featuring Cristina Soto) (Air Up There Recordings)
- 2011 "Lifted" (featuring Cristina Soto) (Air Up There Recordings)
- 2011 "Broken Down" (featuring Meredith Call) (Air Up There Recordings)
- 2011 "I Can Breathe" (featuring Jeza) (Air Up There Recordings)
- 2011 "Something New" (featuring Jenry R) (Air Up There Recordings)
- 2011 "Still With Me" (featuring Cristina Soto) (Air Up There Recordings)
- 2012 "Slave" (Tritonal and Ben Gold Dub Remix) (Air Up There Recordings)
- 2012 "Can't Keep It In" (featuring Jeza) (Air Up There Recordings)
- 2012 "Turbine" (Alter Ego Records)
- 2012 "Apex" (with Ben Gold) (Garuda)
- 2012 "Everafter" (featuring Cristina Soto) (Air Up There Recordings)
- 2012 "Azuca" (with Kaeno)
- 2012 "Arc" (with Super8 & Tab) (Air Up There Recordings)
- 2013 "Bullet That Saved Me" (featuring Underdown) (Enhanced Recordings)
- 2013 "Calling Your Name" (with BT and Emma Hewitt) (Armada Music)
- 2013 "Reset" (with 7 Skies) (Dim Mak Records)
- 2013 "Follow Me Home" (featuring Underdown) (Enhanced Recordings)
- 2013 "Now or Never" (featuring Phoebe Ryan) (Enhanced Recordings)
- 2013 "Electric Glow" (featuring Skyler Stonestreet) (Enhanced Recordings)
- 2014 "Colors" (with Paris Blohm featuring Sterling Fox) (Protocol Recordings)
- 2014 "Satellite" (featuring Jonathan Mendelsohn) (Enhanced Recordings)
- 2014 "Anchor" (Enhanced Recordings)
- 2014 "Seraphic" (with Mr FijiWiji) (Enhanced Recordings)
- 2015 "Ginsu" (Mainstage Music)
- 2015 "Lost" (Tritonal vs. Juventa featuring Micky Blue) (Enhanced Recordings)
- 2015 "Untouchable" (featuring JHart) (Cash Cash vs. Tritonal) (Big Beat Records)
- 2015 "Gamma Gamma" (Enhanced Recordings)
- 2015 "Until You Were Gone" (with The Chainsmokers featuring Emily Warren) (Disruptor Records)
- 2016 "Blackout" (featuring Steph Jones) (Enhanced Recordings)
- 2016 "This Is Love" (with Shanahan featuring Chris Ramos) (Enhanced Recordings)
- 2016 "Rewind" (Enhanced Recordings)
- 2016 "Getaway" (featuring Angel Taylor) (Enhanced Recordings)
- 2016 "Broken" (with Jenaux featuring Adam Lambert) (Enhanced Recordings)
- 2016 "Escape" (featuring Steph Jones)
- 2016 "Hung Up" (with Sj featuring Emma Gatsby) (Enhanced Recordings)
- 2017 "Strangers" (Enhanced Recordings)
- 2017 "Hey Mamama" (Enhanced Recordings)
- 2017 "Wild Kind" (with Varpu) (Enhanced Recordings)
- 2017 "Good Thing" (featuring Laurell) (Enhanced Recordings)
- 2017 "Call Me" (Enhanced Recordings)
- 2017 "Shinin' Bright" (Enhanced Recordings / Spinnin' Records)
- 2018 "Calabasas" (with SJ featuring Tima Dee) (Enhanced Recordings)
- 2018 "Out My Mind" (Enhanced Recordings)
- 2018 "Horizon" (with Seven Lions and Kill The Noise featuring Haliene) [Enhanced Music / Ophelia]
- 2018 "Ready" (with Sultan & Shepard featuring Zach Sorgen) [Enhanced Music]
- 2018 "Just Like You" (with Apek featuring Meron Ryan) [Enhanced Music]
- 2018 "Love U Right" (featuring Lourdiz) [Enhanced Music]
- 2018 "U Found Me" [Enhanced Music]
- 2018 "Gonna Be Alright" (featuring Mozella) [Enhanced Music]
- 2018 "When I'm With U" (featuring Maia Wright) [Enhanced Music]
- 2019 "Easy" (with Kapera featuring Ryann) [Enhanced Music]
- 2019 "Hard Pass" (with Ryann) [Enhanced Music]
- 2019 "Diamonds" (featuring Rosie Darling) [Enhanced Recordings]
- 2019 "Real" (with Evalyn) [Enhanced Recordings]
- 2019 "Little Bit of Love" (featuring Rachel Platten) [Enhanced Recordings]
- 2019 "Never Be the Same" (featuring Rosie Darling) [Enhanced Music]
- 2019 "Shivohum" (with Henry Dark) [Enhanced Music]
- 2020 "Long Way Home" (with Haliene, Schala and Jorza) [Enhanced Music]
- 2020 "Valkyrie" [Enhanced Music]
- 2020 "Worth It All" (with Man Cub) [Enhanced Music]
- 2020 "Born Yesterday" (featuring Brigetta) [Enhanced Music]
- 2020 "Someone To Love You" (featuring Brooke Williams) [Enhanced Recordings]
- 2020 "Electric Kids" (with Linney) [Enhanced Recordings]
- 2020 "Love Is Power" [Enhanced Recordings]
- 2020 "Happy Where We Are" (with Au5 featuring Dylan Matthew) [Enhanced Recordings]
- 2021 "Out of the Dark" (with Emme) [Enhanced Recordings]
- 2021 "Superhuman" (with Codeko) [Enhanced Recordings]
- 2021 "Waterboiler" [Enhanced Recordings]
- 2022 "Losing My Mind" (with Haliene) [Enhanced Recordings]
- 2022 "Safe & Sound" (with Last Heroes and Lizzy Land) [Enhanced Recordings]
- 2026 "Walk Away" (with HARLEE) [Enhanced Recordings]

=== Remixes ===
- 2008 Jaytech - Pepe's Garden (Tritonal Air Up There Mix)
- 2008 Dobenbeck featuring Joanna - Please Don't Go (Tritonal Remix)
- 2008 Andrelli and Blue - Transparent (Tritonal's Air Up There Remix)
- 2008 Jaytech - Vela (Tritonal Air Up There Mix)
- 2009 Masoud Featuring Josie - Leave It All Behind (Tritonal Air Up There Mix)
- 2009 Solarstone Featuring Essence - Lunar Rings (Tritonal Remix)
- 2009 David Forbes - Sunrise (Tritonal's Air Up There Mix)
- 2009 RST and Jared Knapp - Encompass (Tritonal Remix)
- 2009 Ronski Speed featuring Jared Knapp - Encompass (Tritonal Remix)
- 2009 Ferry Corsten - We Belong (Tritonal Air Up There Remix)
- 2010 Dresden and Johnston featuring Nadia Ali and Mikael Johnston - That Day (Tritonal Air Up There Remix)
- 2010 Einar K - Schiphol (Tritonal Air Up There Remix)
- 2010 Nadia Ali - Fantasy (Tritonal Air Up There Remix)
- 2010 Mike Sonar and Solis - Firenova (Tritonal Air Up There Remix)
- 2011 Norin and Rad vs. Recurve - The Gift (Tritonal Air Up There Remix)
- 2011 Steve Brian and Noel Gitman - Luna System (Tritonal Remix)
- 2011 Kyau & Albert - Once in a Life (Tritonal Remix)
- 2011 Sun Decade featuring Emma Lock - Got Me (Tritonal Remix)
- 2011 Matt Lange featuring Cristina Soto - The Other Shore (Tritonal Air Up There Remix)
- 2012 Super8 and Tab - Awakenings (Tritonal Remix)
- 2012 Markus Schulz feat Adina Butar - Caught (Tritonal Remix)
- 2012 Cosmic Gate featuring Cary Brothers - Wake Your Mind (Tritonal Remix)
- 2013 Armin van Buuren featuring Aruna- Won't Let You Go (Tritonal Remix)
- 2014 Zedd featuring Matthew Koma and Miriam Bryant - Find You (Tritonal Remix)
- 2014 Hardwell featuring Matthew Koma - Dare You (Tritonal Remix)
- 2014 Chris Tomlin - Waterfall (Tritonal Remix)
- 2014 Cash Cash - Surrender (Tritonal Remix)
- 2015 Adam Lambert - Ghost Town (Tritonal Remix)
- 2016 Ellie Goulding - Army (Tritonal Remix)
- 2016 Gareth Emery feat Alex and Sierra - We Were Young (Tritonal Remix)
- 2017 Zedd and Alessia Cara - Stay (Tritonal Remix)
- 2017 LEVV - Collateral Damage (Tritonal Remix)
- 2017 The Chainsmokers - Honest (Tritonal Remix)
- 2017 Armin van Buuren featuring Josh Cumbee - "Sunny Days (Tritonal Remix)
- 2018 5 Seconds of Summer - Want You Back (Tritonal Remix)
- 2018 Justin Caruso featuring Cappa and Ryan Hicari - More Than A Stranger (Tritonal Remix)
- 2018 Cheat Codes - Home (Tritonal Remix)
- 2019 Vigiland - Strangers (Tritonal Remix)
