= Take Me Home (Cash Cash song) =

Single by Cash Cash featuring Bebe Rexha

from the album Overtime and Blood, Sweat & 3 Years
- Released: July 15, 2013
- Recorded: 2012
- Genre: EDM; electro house; electropop; progressive house
- Length: 3:25
- Label: Big Beat; Atlantic; AATW
- Songwriters: Samuel Frisch; Alex Makhlouf; Jean Paul Makhlouf; Brandon Lowry; Bleta Rexha
- Producer: Cash Cash

Cash Cash singles chronology
"Overtime" (2012)	"Take Me Home" (2013)	"Lightning" (2014)

Bebe Rexha singles chronology
"Sink or Swim" (2012)	"Take Me Home" (2013)	"I Can't Stop Drinking About You" (2014)

Music video
- "Take Me Home" on YouTube

"Take Me Home" is a song by American DJ trio Cash Cash, featuring American singer Bebe Rexha, taken from Cash Cash's second EP Overtime and their fourth studio album Blood, Sweat & 3 Years. "Take Me Home" was released digitally worldwide on July 15, 2013. In November 2013, the group recorded an acoustic version of "Take Me Home". A music video for the song was released on December 18, 2013.

"Take Me Home" peaked at number 57 on the Billboard Hot 100, as well as number six on the US Hot Dance/Electronic Songs chart. The song also peaked within the top ten of the charts in Australia and The United Kingdom. It was certified Platinum by both the Recording Industry Association of America and Australian Recording Industry Association.

== Background and composition ==
A preview of "Take Me Home" was posted onto SoundCloud in June 2013, before it was officially released as a single on July 15, via iTunes. The song tells of a lover who, despite an unhealthy relationship with her partner, still wants to be with him. According to group member Jean Paul Makhlouf, the song was completed in two days. The song was also recorded in Makhlouf's parents' basement.

It was written by Samuel Frisch, Alex Makhlouf, Jean Paul Makhlouf, Brandon Lowry and Bleta Rexha, while production was handled by Cash Cash. According to the sheet music published at Musicnotes.com, by Alfred Music Publishing, the track runs at a tempo of 128 BPM and is in the key of G major. Musically, the song is described as EDM, electro house, electro-pop and progressive house.

== Versions ==
An acoustic version of "Take Me Home" premiered via Billboard on November 7, 2013. Jean Paul Makhlouf said of this version "would show a whole different side to the song, so we brought it back to the foundation and built a whole new house on top of it." It was later released digitally on February 25, 2014. A remix by the Chainsmokers was released on August 15, 2013, and was later included on a Take Me Home Remixes EP.

== Reception ==
"Take Me Home" was met with generally positive reviews. Bianca Gracie of Idolator stated, "Rexha's lush vocals combined with the thumping synthesized bassline make for a solid tune." Eric Zwilling of Dancing Astronaut said the song "showcase the musicianship of the group through careful manipulation and sampling of the vocals."

== Music video ==
The music video for "Take Me Home" was released on December 18, 2013. The music video was directed by DJ Brawner and showcases a young couple on a road trip in alternating love-hate states. A music video for an acoustic version was released on November 7, 2013.

== In popular culture ==
In the 2014 Stanley Cup Playoffs semi-final series between the Montreal Canadiens and the New York Rangers, the song can often be heard in the pre-game shows in the background while the song's being played in the arena during pre-game warm-ups.

The song was used in several TV spots for the 2016 animated film Finding Dory.

== Chart performance ==
The song peaked at number fifty seven on the Billboard Hot 100 and sold 488,000 downloads in the United States in July 2014, according to Nielsen SoundScan. The song eventually sold 502,000 downloads the following month. It also reached number six and number two on the US Hot Dance/Electronic Songs and Dance Airplay charts, respectively. The song was number one on US dance radio.

Outside of the United States, "Take Me Home" peaked within the top ten of the charts in Australia and the United Kingdom, becoming Cash Cash's first charting song and global hit. The song debuted at number five on the UK Singles Chart, while reaching number seven on the Australian Singles Chart.

== Track listing ==
CD single
No.	Title	Length
1.	"Take Me Home" (feat. Bebe Rexha) (radio edit)	3:28
2.	"Take Me Home" (feat. Bebe Rexha) (original mix)	5:15

Digital download
No.	Title	Length
1.	"Take Me Home" (feat. Bebe Rexha)	3:25
2.	"Take Me Home" (feat. Bebe Rexha) (Alex Guesta & Yan Kings radio edit)	2:45

Digital download – acoustic
No.	Title	Length
1.	"Take Me Home" (feat. Bebe Rexha (acoustic)	3:04

Remixes EP
No.	Title	Length
1.	"Take Me Home" (feat. Bebe Rexha) (Jordy Dazz remix radio edit)	3:45
2.	"Take Me Home" (feat. Bebe Rexha) (Feenixpawl remix radio edit)	2:41
3.	"Take Me Home" (feat. Bebe Rexha) (the Chainsmokers remix radio edit)	3:40
4.	"Take Me Home" (feat. Bebe Rexha) (Caveat remix radio edit)	3:41
5.	"Take Me Home" (feat. Bebe Rexha) (Fareoh remix radio edit)	3:41

== Personnel ==
Credits for "Take Me Home" adapted from the album's liner notes.

Cash Cash

- Jean Paul Makhlouf – composer, mastering, mixing, producer, recording, vocals
- Alex Makhlouf – composer, mastering, mixing, producer, recording, keyboards
- Samuel Frisch – composer, mastering, mixing, producer, recording

Additional musicians

- Bebe Rexha – composer, featured artist, vocals

== Charts ==
=== Weekly charts ===
Weekly chart performance for "Take Me Home"
Chart (2013–2014)	Peak position
Australia (ARIA)	7
Australia Hitseekers (ARIA)	1
Australia Dance (ARIA)	3
Austria (Ö3 Austria Top 40)	63
Belgium (Ultratip Bubbling Under Wallonia)	22
Belgium Dance (Ultratop Wallonia)	41
Canada Hot 100 (Billboard)	52
CIS Airplay (TopHit)	176
Czech Republic Airplay (ČNS IFPI)	57
Czech Republic Singles Digital (ČNS IFPI)	56
Germany (GfK)	86
Ireland (IRMA)	23
Italy (FIMI)	81
Latvia (EHR)	15
Mexico Ingles Airplay (Billboard)	12
Mexico Anglo (Monitor Latino)	19
New Zealand (Recorded Music NZ)	28
Poland Dance (ZPAV)	49
Russia Airplay (Tophit)	157
Scottish Singles Sales (Official Charts)	2
Slovakia Airplay (ČNS IFPI)	93
Slovakia Singles Digital (ČNS IFPI)	62
South Korea International Chart (GAON)	182
Ukraine Airplay (Tophit)	115
UK Singles (Official Charts)	5
UK Dance (Official Charts)	4
US Billboard Hot 100	57
US Adult Pop Airplay (Billboard)	39
US Heatseeker Songs (Billboard)	2
US Hot Dance/Electronic Songs (Billboard)	6
US Pop Airplay (Billboard)	14

=== Year-end charts ===
Yearly chart performance for "Take Me Home"
Chart (2013)	Position
US Hot Dance/Electronic Songs (Billboard)	59
Chart (2014)	Position
Australia (ARIA)	86
Latvia (European Hit Radio)	93
US Hot Dance/Electronic Songs (Billboard)	21

== Certifications ==
Region	Certification	Certified units/sales
Australia (ARIA)	Platinum	70,000^{^}
Canada (Music Canada)	Gold	40,000^{*}
New Zealand (RMNZ)	Gold	7,500^{*}
United Kingdom (BPI)	Gold	400,000^{‡}
United States (RIAA)	Platinum	1,000,000^{‡}
^{*} Sales figures based on certification alone.^{^} Shipments figures based on certification alone.^{‡} Sales+streaming figures based on certification alone.

== Release history ==
Release dates and formats for "Take Me Home"
Region	Date	Format	Label(s)	Ref.
Various	July 15, 2013	Digital download	Big Beat	
United States	October 8, 2013	Mainstream airplay	Big Beat	
Austria	April 25, 2014	CD	Big Beat	
Germany	April 25, 2014	CD	Big Beat	
Switzerland	April 25, 2014	CD	Big Beat	
