= Cash Cash =

American electronic music group

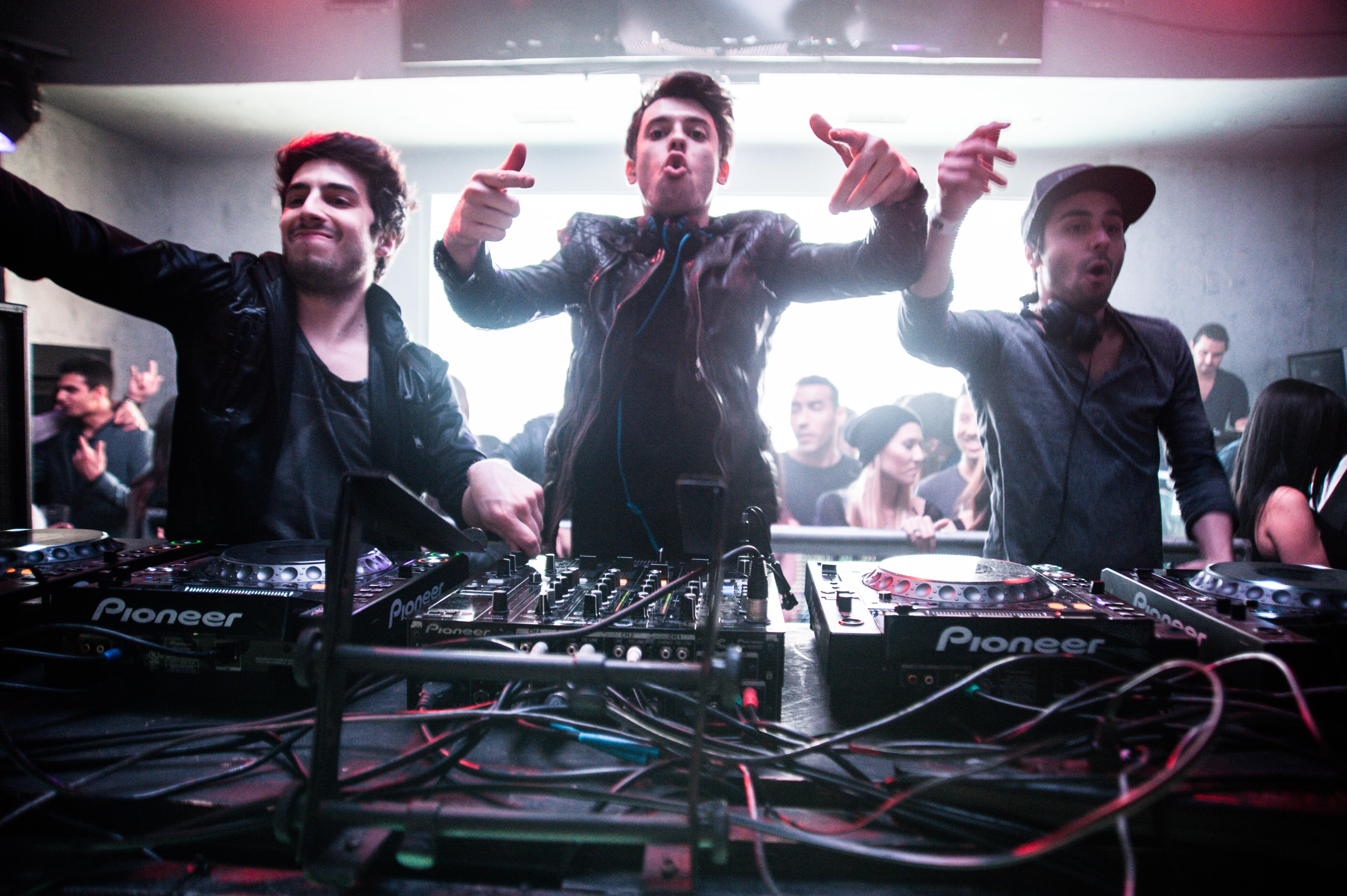
- Cash Cash performing at Club Sutra in 2014

Background information
- Origin: Roseland, New Jersey, U.S.
- Genres: EDM; pop; electro-pop; house; emo-pop; synth-pop
- Occupations: DJs; record producers; musicians
- Works: Discography
- Years active: 2007–present
- Labels: Ultra / Sony (2022–present); Big Beat / Atlantic (2013–2021); Spinnin' (2012–2014); Universal Republic (2008–2010)
- Members: Jean Paul Makhlouf; Alex Makhlouf; Samuel Frisch
- Past members: Anthony Villacari
- Website: cashcashmusic.com

Cash Cash is an American electronic music DJ and production trio from Roseland, New Jersey. The group consists of three DJs / musicians: brothers Jean Paul and Alex Makhlouf and Samuel Frisch. They produce, record, mix and master all their music together as a trio. The group's highest-charting song to date is their RIAA Platinum-certified single "Take Me Home", which features vocals by Bebe Rexha. Throughout their career, they have released a wide range of original songs featuring diverse artists such as John Rzeznik of the Goo Goo Dolls, Nelly, Wiz Khalifa, P!NK, Lukas Graham, Andy Grammer, Christina Perri, Busta Rhymes, Dashboard Confessional, Julia Michaels, Fitz and the Tantrums, Rozes, B.o.B, lovelytheband, Sofia Reyes, Conor Maynard, among many others.

Over the years, Cash Cash released music on various record labels. They were first discovered in 2008 by Universal Republic Records, where they released their debut full-length album. Following their departure from Universal Music in 2010, they released music on various independent labels such as Spinnin' Records and their own label "Cash Cash Music." Between 2013 and 2021, they released all of their original music through Big Beat Records and Atlantic Records, a subsidiary of Warner Music Group worldwide. On August 26, 2022, Cash Cash announced on their social media platforms that they had parted ways with their longtime record label Big Beat / Atlantic Records and posted a video in the New York Sony Music office signing a new record deal with Ultra Records and Sony Music Entertainment.

As of 2022, the group has released five full-length albums, an array of EPs and singles, and co-wrote, produced, and featured on Pink's charting single "Can We Pretend." Aside from their original music, Cash Cash has provided official remixes for worldwide artists such as Britney Spears, Kelly Clarkson, Katy Perry, Bruno Mars and various others. They also produced and co-wrote Krewella's charting single "Live for the Night." As of 2026, Cash Cash has played over 1,000 live shows in various countries all over the world.

== History ==
=== Early years (2002–2007) ===
Cash Cash members Jean Paul Makhlouf and Samuel Frisch first began playing together under the name the Consequence in 2002. As the Consequence, the band put out three releases independently, Your Own Place (2004), The Consequence (2005), and By the Bedside (2006). The band went through various keyboardists and drummers before solidifying the group with Makhlouf's brother, Alexander, and drummer Anthony Villacari in 2007.

=== Take It to the Floor (2008–2010) ===
In early 2008, the group coalesced under the name Cash Cash, with members Jean Paul Makhlouf, Alexander Makhlouf, Samuel Frisch, and Anthony Villacari. They came up with the name Cash Cash due to legal issues that arose from not trademarking their previous name the Consequence. In an interview Jean Paul stated, "Basically we were in a previous group growing up and never thought to copyright the name because when you're a young local garage band, you don't have the money and don't think it really matters. Well after we signed our first record deal, it kind of did matter. We got hit with a ton of legal notices about it from the person who owned the name, and had this old agent trying to screw us over, so when putting the new group together out of frustration, I was like, we should just name this group 'Cash Cash' because every one is after our cash, and we don't have any yet."

When their song "Party In Your Bedroom" started to get spun at the Angels & Kings club in New York City, the track garnered a lot of buzz and attracted the interest of several record labels. They signed with Universal Republic Records and soon after released an EP, Cash Cash, which reached number 24 on the Billboard Heatseekers chart. In 2008, the group toured with groups such as Tyga, Metro Station, Boys Like Girls, the White Tie Affair, and Forever the Sickest Kids. Their debut full-length album Take It to the Floor was released digitally on December 23, 2008, on iTunes by Universal Republic Records and physically on January 20, 2009, reaching number 31 on the Heatseekers chart. It was recorded the year prior at Anntenna Studios, Digital Heart Beat Studios and Fresh Kills Studio, with all 12 tracks mixed by Jean Paul Makhlouf. During the winter of 2008 and 2009, the group did a Hot Topic in-store tour with We the Kings and Hey Monday, performing acoustic songs and doing signings. In 2009, the band added Mike Doerr as a touring guitarist. In April 2009, the group released the album's lead single, "Party In Your Bedroom" to radio. That same month, Cash Cash toured with Kevin Rudolf, Hyper Crush, and Jeremy Greene on the Let it Rock tour. Cash Cash played the main stage at Bamboozle in May 2009; they then toured the United Kingdom opening for Cobra Starship. That summer, they performed on the Vans Warped Tour. During that Warped Tour, Doerr left group. In the fall of 2009, they toured with Family Force 5 and Breathe Carolina.

In late 2009 and 2010, the group released several singles which were not part of an album or EP release, including a cover of Cascada's single "Everytime We Touch" featuring rapper MC Oz. The group continued to tour through the winter of 2009, playing the Seattle Kiss FM show "Jingle Bell Bash" with the All-American Rejects, Cobra Starship, and All Time Low. At the end of February and into the spring of 2010, the group went on their first headlining United States tour, the Robots in Hightops Tour. On March 8, 2010, Cash Cash released a cover single of the Alphaville song "Forever Young". The band released a new single in mid-November 2010, by Universal Republic Records titled "Red Cup (I Fly Solo)", featuring Lacey Schwimmer and Spose. Jean-Paul Makhlouf performed the opening theme to Sonic Colors called "Reach for the Stars" as well as the ending theme "Speak With Your Heart" with band member Alex Makhlouf. Both of these tracks would later be remixed for the Sonic 30th Anniversary Symphony in 2021; the tracks would also be used in Sonic Colors: Ultimate, which was released later in the same year.

=== Love or Lust and The Beat Goes On (2011–2012) ===
Their second full-length album, Love or Lust, was released on April 19, 2011, by the Japanese label Twilight Records. The album was recorded in their home studio in Roseland, New Jersey. The lead single "Victim of Love" was released on April 5, 2011. Multiple songs off the album were featured on MTV's Jersey Shore and The Real World. The album's second single, "Sexin' on the Dance Floor" was released on June 7, 2011. To support the album, the group went on the Summer of Lust Tour. The group also went on tour with Stereo Skyline in Brazil, as well as shows in Japan supporting the album. In 2011, the group parted ways with their drummer Anthony Villacari due to creative differences and continued to operate as a trio. Anthony Villacari continues to play drums in another trio, known as Moa Desert.

The group released the lead single from their forthcoming third album on July 11, 2012, titled "Michael Jackson (The Beat Goes On)", a tribute to the musician Michael Jackson and returned to Japan in 2012, for another tour supporting their new single. The album's original release date was scheduled for June 13, 2012, however, due to distribution plans, it was re-scheduled for another date. Cash Cash released their third album The Beat Goes On on September 7, 2012, as an 11-song LP in Japan, but a 6-song EP in every other country. Both formats contained the two songs "Michael Jackson" and "I Like It Loud," which were also soon after released as singles by Dutch independent dance label Spinnin' Records. On November 26, the trio released "Overtime" via SoundCloud as a free download. The song peaked at number 39 on the US Hot Dance/Electronic Songs chart. On December 10, Cash Cash had their remix of "Alive" by Krewella released on the Play Harder Remix EP. Throughout the year, Cash Cash had numerous original songs and remixes reach number 1 on the Hype Machine popular chart.

The group's contributions to the Sonic franchise continued with a number of remixes in both the console and 3DS versions of Sonic Generations.

=== Overtime and Lightning EPs (2013–2015) ===
The group slowly gained exposure in the dance community in 2012 and 2013, particularly via connections with Hardwell and Nicky Romero and releases on their boutique labels. In 2013, the group signed with Big Beat Records and Atlantic Records. On July 15, 2013, the group released "Take Me Home", featuring vocalist Bebe Rexha, which became their highest-charting single in the United States and United Kingdom. It peaked at number 14 on the US Pop Songs chart and number 57 on the US Billboard Hot 100, and debuted at number 4 on the UK Dance Chart and number 5 on the UK Singles Chart in 2014. The song was certified Platinum by the Recording Industry Association of America. An acoustic version of the song, along with a video documenting the recording process, was released in November 2013. In 2013, Cash Cash launched their online podcast/radio show named "Royalty Radio" on their SoundCloud page as well as YouTube channel. The group performed at the ADE festival on October 16, 2013, at the Melkweg in Amsterdam with Martin Garrix, Vicetone, Dimitri Vegas & Like Mike, and John Dahlbäck.

Following the Atlantic Records signing, the group released two EPs of new material. On October 29, they released their Overtime EP, consisting of six new songs, including "Take Me Home", "Hideaway", featuring British singer Ella Eyre and "Here and Now", featuring vocals from Estonian singer Kerli. The EP reached number 11 on the US Dance/Electronic Albums chart. In support of the EP, the group went on a North American tour from October to November 2013. On March 24, 2014, the group released the Lightning EP, consisting of a new single "Lightning" and remixes of previous songs off the Overtime EP. "Lightning" features John Rzeznik of the Goo Goo Dolls on vocals and was written by Cash Cash and Rzeznik. A remix pack for "Lightning" was released on August 5, on iTunes containing remixes by Dash Berlin, EDX, Sex Panther, and Audiobot.

On March 27, Cash Cash received an IDMA at Winter Music Conference for Best Break-Through Artist (Group). On April 9, Rolling Stone premiered the "Cash Cash x Valley" remix of Clean Bandit's "Rather Be" on their website. Following their appearance at Winter Music Conference in Miami, the group played an international show in Montreal, Canada at New City Gas on April 19. In May 2014, Cash Cash performed on multiple dates of the Budweiser Made in America tour along with Big Gigantic. The group also performed at the 2014 Lollapalooza event.

On September 2, 2014, BPM exclusively premiered their new single, "Surrender", which was released in iTunes on September 16. On September 5, Cash Cash played in Nocturnal Wonderland in San Bernardino, California. As of 2014, EMI Music Publishing's website confirms that as songwriters, Cash Cash is currently signed to EMI Music Publishing, which is now owned by a consortium led by Sony/ATV Music Publishing. In April and May 2015, Cash Cash embarked on an overseas tour performing in Indonesia, Japan, Singapore, Malaysia, China, and South Korea. Cash Cash and Tritonal officially released their song collaboration "Untouchable" on iTunes by Big Beat Records on May 18, 2015. The collaboration features the vocals of British-American singer JHart. In support of their collaboration, Cash Cash and Tritonal embarked on a co-headline tour titled Untouchable Tour. From 2013 to 2017, Cash Cash were Las Vegas resident DJ's at Marquee Night and Dayclub.

=== Blood, Sweat & 3 Years (2016–2019) ===
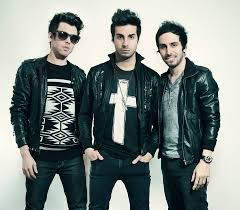
Cash Cash

Cash Cash started 2016 with the release of their single "Aftershock," featuring Jacquie Lee on January 29. Following some live acoustic performances with Jacquie, a music video was put out. The song was later included on the pre-order for the album Blood, Sweat & 3 Years. In February 2016, the group and Busta Rhymes played a show together in Las Vegas that was part of a tour series Cash Cash created called Make That Cash Cash. Throughout 2016, the tour series played various cities bringing out artists such as Rae Sremmurd, Wiz Khalifa, Lil Dicky, French Montana, and A$AP Ferg.

Billboard officially announced the group's fourth full-length album titled, Blood, Sweat & 3 Years on April 29, 2016. The pre-order went live with the single "How To Love", featuring Sofia Reyes along with a few previously released songs available for instant download. The album includes songs featuring singers Bebe Rexha, Christina Perri, Dev, John Rzeznik, Julia Michaels, Michael "Fitz" Fitpatrick from Fitz and the Tantrums, Neon Hitch; rappers B.o.B, Busta Rhymes, Nelly, and Trinidad James; and groups Little Daylight, and Night Terrors of 1927. Upon the album's pre-order, a music video for the single "How to Love" was released online. That same day, the trio also launched their new radio show on Sirius XM's "BPM" channel called "Cash Cash Radio." On June 3, the trio released the single "Millionaire", a collaboration with Digital Farm Animals and Nelly. On June 20, they released a music video for "Broken Drum", featuring Fitz of Fitz and the Tantrums. The music video was filmed throughout Las Vegas and had a guest appearance by Wiz Khalifa. Blood, Sweat & 3 Years was released on June 24, and debuted at number 125 on the US Billboard 200. The album was certified Platinum by the Korea Music Content Association.

On August 12, Cash Cash released a remix for "Make Me..." by Britney Spears that was included on her official remix package. In the fall of 2016, Cash Cash embarked on their largest-ever headlining tour called Must Be the Money Tour. In January 2017, they signed an exclusive Las Vegas residency with Hakkasan Group from 2017 to 2020, playing their family of nightclubs including Hakkasan, Omnia, Wet Republic, and Jewel. The group also continued to release singles that year. On March 2, they released "Matches" featuring Rozes. On July 7, they released "All My Love" featuring Conor Maynard. As a reaction to the October 1, 2017, Las Vegas mass shooting, Cash Cash along with Tiesto, Steve Aoki, Kaskade, Zedd, and Celine Dion played a benefit show at Omnia night club on November 7, 2017, raising 1 million dollars for the Las Vegas victims fund. On December 15, Cash Cash collaborated with Dashboard Confessional and released the single "Belong". On December 24, they performed at NYE 2018 Week.

In April 2018, the band released a single titled, "Finest Hour" featuring Abir, which was certified Gold in the US. On November 30, the group released the single "Call You" featuring Nasri of Magic!. On April 11, 2019, the group was featured on the single released by Pink titled, "Can We Pretend". The song peaked at number 1 on the Billboard Dance Club Songs chart.

=== Say It Like You Feel It (2020−present) ===
In 2020, Cash Cash began releasing singles for their upcoming fifth album. They released "Mean It" on January 24, featuring American singer Wrabel. On March 2, the group collaborated with Andy Grammer and released a reimagined version of his song "I Found You". In May 2020, they released "Gasoline" featuring Laura White, which reached the Top 10 on the US Dance/Mix Show Airplay chart. The group released another single on February 12, 2021, titled "Too Late" with Wiz Khalifa and Lukas Graham. The group's fifth album Say It Like You Feel It was released on May 14, 2021. The album features many singles released for the album including "Mean It", "Gasoline" and "Too Late", as well as previously released singles "Matches", "All My Love", "Belong", "Jewel", "Finest Hour" and "Call You". Additionally, the album features collaborations with Conor Maynard, Abir, Phoebe Ryan and Alex Newell. Former live guitarist Mike Doerr (now known as Zookëper) contributed on the band's album as a co-producer on their song "Gasoline" featuring Laura White. Cash Cash released a new series called Produced Mixed Mastered, documenting the behind the scenes process of them working on their fifth album and their song "Too Late". The group also released a remix of "Way Less Sad" by AJR on June 29. The band hosted the 40th Annual RAMMY Awards Gala in July 2022.

On August 26, 2022, the group signed with Ultra Records. They released their first single with the label on January 13, 2023, titled "Anyway" featuring Irish singer-songwriter RuthAnne. On May 19, Cash Cash released the single "Bleach (Move On)", which features returning lead vocals from Jean Paul Makhlouf since the group's third album, The Beat Goes On. On September 15, the group released a remix version of "Tell It to My Heart" by Taylor Dayne. The remix reached number 32 on the US Hot Dance/Electronic Songs chart and won the 2024 Electronic Dance Music Awards for Remake of the Year. The group signed as resident DJ's at Las Vegas's Zouk Nightclub & Ayu Dayclub located in Resorts World Casino Hotel from 2021 to 2025.

== Musical style ==
While playing as the Consequence and early under the name Cash Cash, the group used a more traditional band setup, with use of live guitars, bass guitar, drums, keyboards, vocoders, talk boxes, and electronics. Hip Online referred to the group's early releases as technopop, while AllMusic classified Take It to the Floor as electronic, pop rock and emo pop. AllMusic further described the album as "[f]illed with [processed] vocals, old-school synths, singalong choruses, [and] slick-as-oil vocal harmonies." PopMatters noted the album's "standard emo-pop elements" and opined that the group's style "suggest[s] Fall Out Boy with some synthy window dressing." Jean-Paul described the band's early style as an attempt to "Bring back some of that 70s funk guitar, mixed in with the life and fun of the 80s." USA Today, in a later assessment, noted that the group's early work "has always had a dance-music sensibility, but starting out, they were lumped into the alt-rock scene."

Over the course of the early 2010s, the group began moving away from standard band instrumentation and began incorporating more elements of electronic dance music. In an interview with EDM Sauce, they talk about their transition being facilitated by frequent production and remixing on the side. Cash Cash stated, "I think for us it was a slow evolution, because we were always remixing and producing for other artists and doing outside production." In another interview with Only the Beat, the group stated, "When we first started as a band our sound was "poppy", but we always had underlying electronic elements to our music. Once we started changing and growing, our sound slowly began evolving." The group's 2011 album Love or Lust was described by Under the Gun Review as "dance/power pop...full of bass rhythms, synthetic claps, techno beats, and dance/party/club themes". Following releases and remixes were also received as electronica and electropop.

Cash Cash's first RIAA certified song "Take Me Home" has been categorized by as a progressive house dance song. Dancing Astronaut described the Overtime EP's electro house qualities by stating the group is "gracing the world with a dose of electro house and dubbed-out tunes." Songs off the Overtime EP such as "Here and Now" and "Satellites" have been classified as house or its subgenre electro house. Dancing Astronaut further elaborated on the sound of the release by stating, "The EP continues with a bright feel, boosted by the unique blend of fluorescent synths and dirty bass." Other Cash Cash originals such as "Kiss the Sky" and "Overtime" along with their remix of "Treasure" by Bruno Mars have been labeled by electronic music blogs as nu-disco and glitch hop. Throughout 2014, the group's subsequent singles "Lightning" and "Surrender" were also reviewed as progressive house and electro house.

== Production equipment and software ==
In 2013, Cash Cash stated in their The Huffington Post interview that they produce their music using Steinberg's Cubase as their digital audio workstation. In another interview with EDM blog "Notable Dance," the group stated "We use Cubase as a host for everything but we mess around in Ableton." In a studio video released in May 2013, the group discussed various equipment and gear they use, including a vintage Roland Juno-D, Avalon AD2022 preamp, Empirical Labs Distressor, Joe Meek Twin Q, and Neumann TLM 49. During the video they speak about owning a few discontinued Samson D-1500 real time analyzers. Their speaker set up consists of Adam A8X's and a pair of mix cubes that are A/B controlled by a PreSonus Central Station. The producer trio recently added a Neumann U 87 to their studio set up as well.

== Members ==
During the group's early days as a band, they operated & signed their first record deal as a four-piece band. For their first three years signed to Universal Republic Records, they also toured with a live touring musician on guitar & back up vocals. Around mid 2011, the group shifted their focus to electronic production, collaborating with outside artists, remixing songs, and using electronic drums instead of a drummer which ultimately led to the departure of their original drummer Anthony Villacari.

Current members

- Jean Paul Makhlouf – vocals, guitar, DJ, production, programming, mixing, mastering (2007–present)
- Alexander Luke Makhlouf – keyboards, vocoder, talk box, vocals, DJ, production, programming, mixing, mastering (2007–present)
- Samuel Warren Frisch – bass guitar, drums, vocals, DJ, production, programming, mixing, mastering (2007–present)

Former members

- Anthony Villacari – drums (2007–2011)

Former touring musicians

- Mike Doerr – guitar, backup vocals (2008–2009)

== Discography ==
Studio albums

- Take It to the Floor (2008)
- Love or Lust (2011)
- The Beat Goes On (2012)
- Blood, Sweat & 3 Years (2016)
- Say It Like You Feel It (2021)

== Awards and nominations ==
=== Electronic Dance Music Awards ===
Year	Nominated	Award	Result	Ref.
2024	"Tell It to My Heart"	Remake of the Year	Won	

=== International Dance Music Awards ===
Year	Nominated	Award	Result	Ref.
2014	Cash Cash	Best Break-Through Artist (Group)	Won	

=== MTV Buzzworthy ===
Year	Nominated	Award	Result	Ref.
2009	"Party In Your Bedroom"	Best Freshmen Video	Won	

=== Radio Disney Music Awards ===
Year	Nominated	Award	Result	Ref.
2017	"Millionaire"	Best Dance Track	Nominated	

== Tours ==
Headlining

- The Robots in Hightops Tour (2010)
- Summer of Lust Tour (2011)
- North American Tour (2013)
- Must Be the Money Tour (2016)

Co-headlining

- Made in America Tour (with Big Gigantic) (2014)
- Untouchable Tour (with Tritonal) (2015)

As a support act

- Let it Rock Tour (Kevin Rudolf) (2009)
- United Kingdom Tour (Cobra Starship) (2009)

Festivals

- The Bamboozle (2009)
- Vans Warped Tour (2009)
- Amsterdam Dance Event (2013)
- Lollapalooza (2014)
- Nocturnal Wonderland (2014)
