= Big Beat Records (American record label) =

American electronic and dance music record label

Big Beat Records Inc.
- Parent company: Warner Music Group
- Founded: 1986
- Founder: Craig Kallman
- Distributor: Atlantic Records
- Genre: Electronic; dance; hip-hop; R&B
- Country of origin: U.S.
- Location: New York City
- Official website: wearebigbeat.com

Big Beat Records Inc. is an American electronic and dance music record label, owned by Warner Music Group and operates through Atlantic Records. It was founded as an independent record label in 1986 by Craig Kallman with an emphasis on house music and later hip-hop. It was absorbed into Atlantic Records in 1992 and eventually relaunched separately in 2010 as a primarily electronic music label. Its current roster includes 100 gecs, Dog Blood, Galantis, Whethan, Cash Cash, and Clean Bandit.

== History ==
=== 1987–1998: Original Big Beat ===
The first iteration of Big Beat was founded as an Independent record label in 1986 by Craig Kallman who was, at the time, a 20-year-old deejay in New York City. The company initially operated out of Kallman's bedroom where he recorded the label's first track, "Join Hands" by Taravhonty, which sold 5,000 copies largely through direct promotion at record stores by Kallman himself.

The second record Kallman recorded in his bedroom studio was titled "The Party" by Kraze, which would go on to sell 250,000 units in the United States and internationally. Soon after, Kallman began focusing on developing the record label, signing acts like Tara Kemp and Jomanda over the following three years. He would sell Kemp's contract to Giant in 1991. Also that year, Jomanda released a record entitled "Got a Love for You" on Big Beat which attracted the attention of Doug Morris, the co-chairman of Atlantic Records at the time. Atlantic acquired Big Beat and made Kallman the Vice President of A&R while he still operated Big Beat.

As the 1990s escalated, the label's roster shifted from primarily house music to more hip hop music. Big Beat signed a variety of artists including Mad Skillz, Changing Faces, Robin S., Fat Joe, Junior M.A.F.I.A. X Change, Lil' Kim (both via the company's Undeas imprint), Artifacts, Art n' Soul, Double X Posse, Kenny Dope, Dawn Penn, Marshall Jefferson, Todd Terry, Quad City DJs, Percee P, and numerous others.

In 1997, the label signed rapper Fat Joe.

In September 1998, the label released Fat Joe's third studio album Don Cartagena. The album was top 10 on the Billboard 200, and was certified gold by the RIAA. That same year, the label and its roster were absorbed into Atlantic Records. In 2001, an attempt to relaunch Big Beat was planned, but ultimately abandoned.

=== 2010–present: Relaunch ===
Big Beat was relaunched under Atlantic Records as a dance-focused label in 2010. Artists on the label at the time of the relaunch included Skrillex, Chromeo, Wynter Gordon, Martin Solveig, Teddybears, and others. The relaunched label's first hit came in 2010 with Wynter Gordon's "Dirty Talk" which reached #1 on the ARIA singles chart and the Billboard Dance Club Songs chart and was certified triple platinum in Australia. Martin Solveig's song "Hello," which was released in 2011 in the United States, peaked at #46 on the Billboard Hot 100 chart and at #1 on the Dance Club Songs chart while also achieving Platinum status from the RIAA.

Skrillex's Scary Monsters and Nice Sprites EP, released in 2010, effectively charted the label's trajectory toward electronic music. The EP sold hundreds of thousands of copies and its title track sold over 2 million copies and appeared on the Billboard Hot 100. At the 54th Grammy Awards in 2012, the EP was named the Best Dance/Electronic Album and its title track won Best Dance Recording. The following year at the 55th Grammy Awards, Skrillex again won Best Dance/Electronic Album for his Bangarang EP along with Best Dance Recording for the EP's title track which featured Sirah. He also won the Grammy Award for Best Remixed Recording, Non-Classical for his and Nero's remix of the Nero song, "Promises".

In 2013, Big Beat signed Icona Pop, a Swedish electropop duo that would go on to release the 4× Platinum "I Love It" featuring Charli XCX. The label also signed Cash Cash—whose 2013 single, "Take Me Home" featuring Bebe Rexha, was certified Platinum— and Galantis around that time. In December 2013, Big Beat's parent company, Warner Music Group, acquired Parlophone (a German-British record label). As part of the terms of the deal, David Guetta was added to Big Beat's roster.

In 2014, Clean Bandit released its album, New Eyes, on Big Beat. The lead single from the album, "Rather Be" featuring Jess Glynne, won the Grammy for Best Dance Recording at the 57th Grammy Awards in 2015. Liz Miller, Big Beat's General Manager in 2014, was named one of the "50 Most Important People in EDM" by Rolling Stone. In November 2014, David Guetta's first album with Big Beat, Listen, was released featuring the eventual double-platinum lead single "Hey Mama" featuring Nicki Minaj, Bebe Rexha, and Afrojack.

In 2015, Skrillex released a collaborative album with Diplo entitled Skrillex and Diplo Present Jack Ü. At the 58th Grammy Awards in 2016, the album won the award for Best Dance/Electronic Album. Its lead single, "Where Are Ü Now" featuring Justin Bieber, won for Best Dance Recording. Galantis' 2016 single, "No Money" amassed nearly 700 million streams globally and charted on the Hot 100, Dance/Electronic Songs chart, and numerous other charts throughout the world.

In 2017, Big Beat executives, Craig Kallman and Gina Tucci, were listed among Billboard's list of "Dance Power Players." Big Beat label mates Skrillex and David Guetta were also on the list. Also in 2017, Mixmag nominated Big Beat for the label of the decade.

== Current roster ==
- 100 gecs
- A7S
- Clean Bandit
- Cobrah
- Crooked Colours
- David Guetta
- Elderbrook
- Galantis
- Goodboys
- Jack Ü
- Joel Corry
- John Summit
- The Knocks
- Kream
- Ofenbach
- Riton
- Robin Schulz

== See also ==
- List of record labels
