= Zookeeper (disambiguation) =

A zookeeper is a worker in a zoo, responsible for the feeding and daily care of the animals.

Zookeeper may also refer to:

- Zookeeper (film), a 2011 comedy film
- The Zookeeper (2001 film), a drama film
- Zoo Keeper (1983 video game), an arcade game from Taito America
- Zoo Keeper (2003 video game), a puzzle video game originally released as a browser game
- Zookeeper (comics), a fictional character from the Teen Titans comics
- Apache ZooKeeper, a service for coordinating processes of distributed applications
- Zookeper (born 1989), stage name of American electronic music artist and producer Michael Doerr (also stylized "Zookëper")
