= Used to Be =

Used to Be may refer to:

- "Used to Be" (Beach House song), 2008
- "Used to Be" (Steve Aoki and Kiiara song), 2021
- Used to Be, a 1982 album by Charlene
- "Used to Be", a 1982 song by Charlene and Stevie Wonder
- "Used to Be", a 2018 song by AJ Mitchell
- "Used to Be", a 2019 song by the Jonas Brothers from the album, Happiness Begins
- "Used to Be", a 2020 song by Best Coast from the album, Always Tomorrow

== See also ==
- "Use ta Be My Girl", a 1978 song by The O'Jays
