= I Guess I Just Feel Like =

Single by John Mayer

from the album Sob Rock
- Released: February 22, 2019
- Recorded: 2018
- Genre: Folk rock; soft rock; country; blues
- Length: 4:46
- Label: Snack Money; Columbia
- Songwriters: John Mayer; Ernest Wilson
- Producers: John Mayer; No I.D.

John Mayer singles chronology
"New Light" (2018)	"I Guess I Just Feel Like" (2019)	"Carry Me Away" (2019)

"I Guess I Just Feel Like" is a 2019 song by John Mayer. It was first played at the iHeartRadio Theater in October 2018, and released as a single on February 22, 2019. After more than 2 years, in July 2021, the song was included on the album Sob Rock.

The track finds Mayer discussing the state of the world and his own flaws, and marks a return to the artist's blues roots, with a country music vibe. Despite Mayer saying "there's nothing hit like" about the song, "I Guess I Just Feel Like" was a successful single, reaching number 6 on the Billboard Hot Rock & Alternative Songs, number 22 on the Billboard Adult Alternative Airplay, and number 28 on the Billboard Adult Pop Airplay, while reaching instead a more modest number 94 on the Billboard Hot 100. The song is also the second most-streamed song from its album, behind the lead single "New Light".

== Charts ==
Chart performance for "I Guess I Just Feel Like"
Chart (2019)	Peak position
New Zealand Hot Singles (RMNZ)	10
US Billboard Hot 100	94
US Adult Pop Airplay (Billboard)	28
US Hot Rock & Alternative Songs (Billboard)	6

== Certifications ==
Certifications for "I Guess I Just Feel Like"
Region	Certification	Certified units/sales
Australia (ARIA)	Gold	35,000^{‡}
Denmark (IFPI Danmark)	Gold	45,000^{‡}
New Zealand (RMNZ)	Gold	15,000^{‡}
United States (RIAA)	Gold	500,000^{‡}
^{‡} Sales+streaming figures based on certification alone.
