= Sob Rock =

- Apple Music digital cover

Studio album by John Mayer
- Released: July 16, 2021
- Recorded: 2017–2021
- Studio: Henson Recording Studios (Los Angeles)
- Genres: Power pop; Pop rock; soft rock
- Length: 38:27
- Label: Columbia
- Producers: John Mayer; Don Was; No I.D.; Chad Franscoviak

John Mayer chronology
The Search for Everything (2017)	Sob Rock (2021)

Singles from Sob Rock
- 1. "New Light" Released: May 10, 2018; 2. "I Guess I Just Feel Like" Released: February 22, 2019; 3. "Carry Me Away" Released: September 6, 2019; 4. "Last Train Home" Released: June 4, 2021; 5. "Shot in the Dark" Released: July 16, 2021; 6. "Wild Blue" Released: August 18, 2021

Sob Rock is the eighth studio album by American singer-songwriter John Mayer, released on July 16, 2021, by Columbia Records. Sob Rock is Mayer's final album on Columbia, announcing in March 2022 that he "decided not to renew my recording agreement". The single "New Light", released in May 2018, is included on the album, as are Mayer's two singles from 2019, "I Guess I Just Feel Like" and "Carry Me Away". The lead single "Last Train Home" was released on June 4, 2021, and features guest vocals from Maren Morris. Mayer toured the United States with Dead & Company from August through October 2021 and embarked on a solo tour in support of the album in 2022.

== Background ==
Mayer has stated that this album was mostly born out of the COVID-19 pandemic, with most of the songs on the album resulting from the time after March 2020 when touring was shut down for many artists. Mayer's goal was to work on a 10-track album that paid homage to the songs he heard in his childhood growing up in the '80s. Mayer said that the idea of this album was meant to "confuse the listeners" and "implant false memories." He also stated in an interview with Zane Lowe that the record was meant to be a shitpost, trying to go against everything he had released up to that point.

Mayer also decided that three of his previous singles were also going to be on the album when it released. These singles ("New Light", "I Guess I Just Feel Like", and "Carry Me Away") had all been released in the time from mid-2018 to late 2019 and were not originally intended to be on an album.

Initially, Mayer claimed that the album was to be released in mid-April 2021. However he later announced the delay of the record to July 16. It was recorded between late 2017 and early 2021. Mayer released "Last Train Home" as a single on June 4, 2021. Before that, clips of the track were released onto Mayer's TikTok account in late March 2021. It was also announced that the album was to be released on physical formats, adding different vinyl and cassette editions.

== Promotion ==
In addition to Mayer himself creating a TikTok account, Columbia Records also pushed a marketing campaign revolving around a 1980s advertising aesthetic. Two months before the album released or was even formally announced, posters appeared in various locations in cities around the world. They all described the sound of Sob Rock but never explicitly confirmed ties with Mayer releasing an album. A site called sobrock.net went up around the same time, with a newsletter sign up and a copyright for "John Mayer Enterprises".

On June 1, 2021, Mayer finally confirmed that his new album was indeed called Sob Rock, and additionally gave the release date and cover. From there, Columbia went public and posted 1980s themed billboards and posters to promote the album and single, "Last Train Home". Those who had previously signed up for the website newsletter received a zine focused around the album in the mail.

After "Last Train Home" was released, Mayer released a music video for the single and then performed the song on Jimmy Kimmel Live! on June 7, 2021.

When the album was officially released, Mayer went on The Tonight Show Starring Jimmy Fallon and performed the songs "Shouldn't Matter but It Does" and "Last Train Home". The day after this he confirmed numerous tour dates across America for a Sob Rock Tour in 2022.

The cover art of the album varies between streaming platforms. In the upper right corner, below the "SOB ROCK" text, a sticker unique to the platform the album is being streamed on is displayed. Spotify, Apple Music, Amazon Music, Deezer, and YouTube each have unique stickers, while SoundCloud, Pandora, Tidal, other services, and physical copies of the album have no sticker at all.

Mayer further went on to release "Wild Blue" as a single, which received an accompanying music video on August 18, 2021.

== Critical reception ==
Professional ratings
Aggregate scores
Source	Rating
Metacritic	70/100
Review scores
Source	Rating
AllMusic	3.5/5 stars
The Independent	3/5 stars
NME	4/5 stars
Pitchfork	6.1/10
Rolling Stone	3.5/5 stars

Sob Rock received generally positive reviews from music critics. At Metacritic, which assigns a normalized rating out of 100 to reviews from mainstream critics, the album has an average score of 70 based on 9 reviews, indicating "generally favorable" reception.

It was elected by Guitar World's readers as the best guitar album of 2021. Jon Caramanica of The New York Times derisively wrote that the record draws on 1980's nostalgia to sell new collectables from John Mayer, the brand.

== Track listing ==
All tracks are written by John Mayer, except where noted.

No.	Title	Length
1.	"Last Train Home"	3:07
2.	"Shouldn't Matter but It Does"	3:56
3.	"New Light" (John Mayer, Ernest Wilson)	3:37
4.	"Why You No Love Me"	4:15
5.	"Wild Blue"	4:12
6.	"Shot in the Dark"	4:09
7.	"I Guess I Just Feel Like"	4:46
8.	"Til the Right One Comes"	3:41
9.	"Carry Me Away"	2:39
10.	"All I Want Is to Be with You"	4:04
Total length:		38:27

== Personnel ==
Adapted from album's liner notes.

=== Musicians ===
- John Mayer – vocals, guitars, keyboards (tracks 1, 4, 8–10), piano (tracks 2, 6), bass (tracks 4, 6, 8)
- Aaron Sterling – drums, percussion (tracks 7, 10)
- Greg Phillinganes – keyboards (tracks 1, 4, 9), synthesizers (tracks 2, 6)
- Sean Hurley – bass (tracks 1, 2, 5, 7, 10)
- Lenny Castro – percussion (tracks 1, 4–6)
- Maren Morris – vocals (tracks 1, 4, 6)
- Pino Palladino – bass (tracks 3, 9)
- Jeff Babko – keyboards (tracks 5, 10)
- Larry Goldings – keyboards (track 4)
- Greg Leisz – pedal steel guitar (track 4)
- Jamie Muhoberac – keyboards (track 9)
- Cautious Clay – vocals (track 9)

=== Production ===
- John Mayer – producer
- Don Was – producer (tracks 1, 2, 4–6, 8, 10)
- No I.D. – producer (track 3)
- Chad Franscoviak – co-producer (track 9), engineer (tracks 3, 7, 9)
- Curt Schneider – engineer (tracks 1, 2, 4–6, 8–10)
- Chenao Wang – assistant engineer
- Matt Tuggle – assistant engineer (tracks 7, 9)
- Ryan Lytle – assistant engineer (track 9)
- Mark "Spike" Stent – mixing
- Matt Wolach – mix assistant
- Michael Freeman – mix assistant (track 9)
- Martin Pradler – digital editing
- Randy Merrill – mastering
- Ryan Del Vecchio – mastering assistant

== Charts ==
=== Weekly charts ===
Weekly chart performance for Sob Rock
Chart (2021–2024)	Peak position
Australian Albums (ARIA)	3
Austrian Albums (Ö3 Austria)	8
Belgian Albums (Ultratop Flanders)	3
Belgian Albums (Ultratop Wallonia)	17
Canadian Albums (Billboard)	4
Danish Albums (Hitlisten)	4
Dutch Albums (Album Top 100)	1
Finnish Albums (Suomen virallinen lista)	13
French Albums (SNEP)	79
German Albums (Offizielle Top 100)	5
Greek Albums (IFPI)	73
Irish Albums (Official Charts)	14
Italian Albums (FIMI)	21
Japan Hot Albums (Billboard Japan)	34
Japanese Albums (Oricon)	23
Lithuanian Albums (AGATA)	57
New Zealand Albums (RMNZ)	4
Norwegian Albums (VG-lista)	6
Polish Albums (ZPAV)	25
Portuguese Albums (AFP)	1
Scottish Albums (Official Charts)	2
Spanish Albums (PROMUSICAE)	12
Swedish Albums (Sverigetopplistan)	5
Swiss Albums (Schweizer Hitparade)	4
UK Albums (Official Charts)	4
US Billboard 200	2
US Top Rock Albums (Billboard)	1

=== Year-end charts ===
2021 year-end chart performance for Sob Rock
Chart (2021)	Position
Dutch Albums (Album Top 100)	19
US Top Rock Albums (Billboard)	48

2022 year-end chart performance for Sob Rock
Chart (2022)	Position
Dutch Albums (Album Top 100)	68

== Certifications ==
Certifications for Sob Rock
Region	Certification	Certified units/sales
Canada (Music Canada)	Gold	40,000^{‡}
Denmark (IFPI Danmark)	Platinum	20,000^{‡}
New Zealand (RMNZ)	Gold	7,500^{‡}
United States (RIAA)	Gold	500,000^{‡}
^{‡} Sales+streaming figures based on certification alone.
