= Chaplin Studios =

Film and recording complex

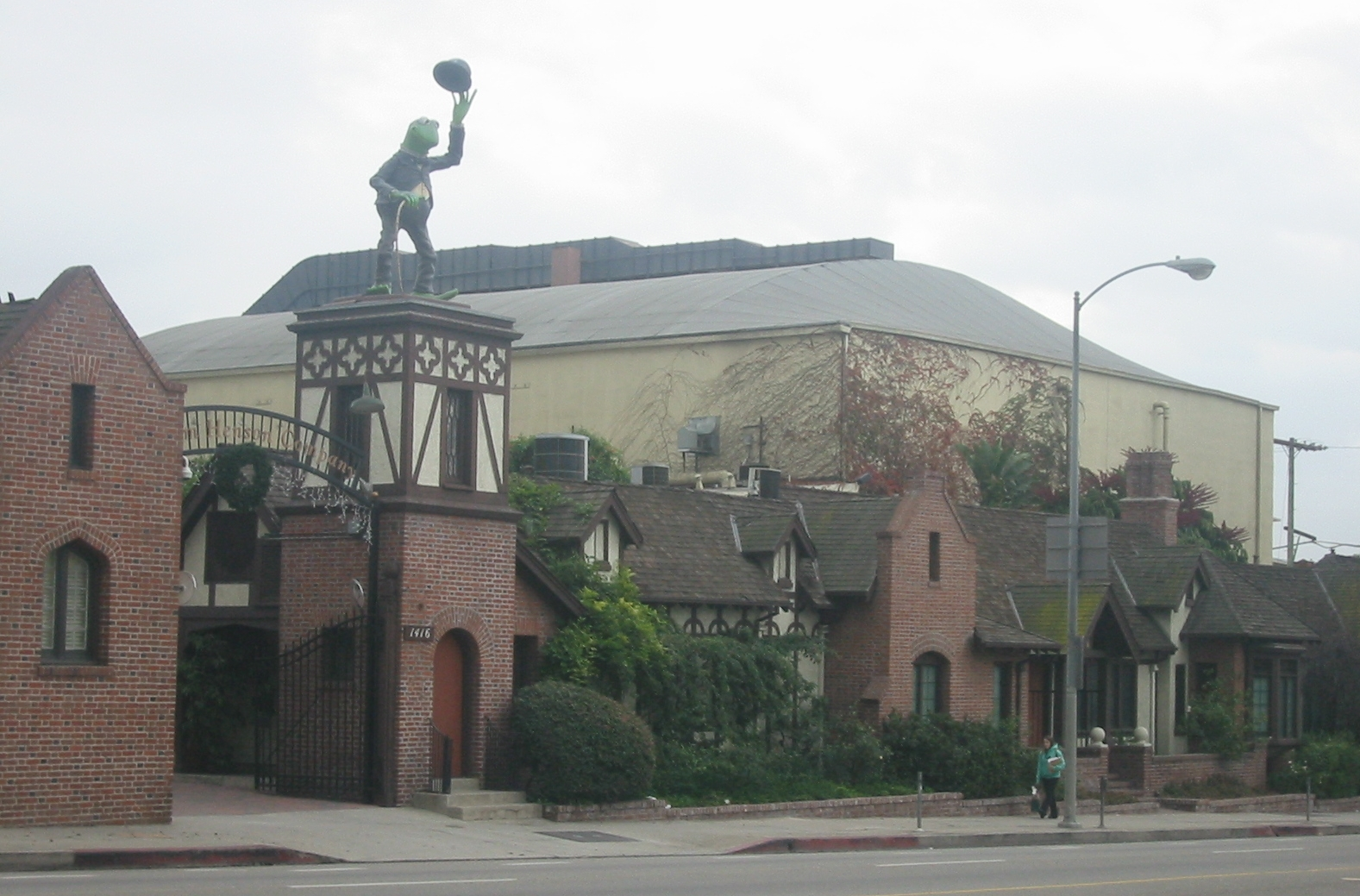
- Main Gates, 2006

- Location within the Los Angeles metropolitan area
- 34°5′47″N 118°20′35″W
- Location: 1416 N. La Brea Avenue; Hollywood, Los Angeles, California, U.S.

History
- Built: 1917; 109 years ago

Site notes
- Area: 80,000 sq ft (7,400 m^{2})
- Governing body: Private
- Owner: John Mayer, McG

Los Angeles Historic-Cultural Monument
- Designated: 1969
- Reference no.: 58

Chaplin Studios (formerly A&M Studios and the Jim Henson Company Lot) is a film and television and music recording studio property located just south of the southeast corner of La Brea Avenue and Sunset Boulevard in Hollywood. Originally established by film star Charlie Chaplin, the property served as Charlie Chaplin Studios from 1917 to 1953, which later earned the site designation as a Los Angeles Historic-Cultural Monument.

After being sold by Chaplin in 1953, the property went through several changes in ownership, including Kling Studios, during which it was the shooting location for the Adventures of Superman, the original studio of Hanna-Barbera Productions, and Red Skelton Studios, serving as the shooting location for Perry Mason.

From 1966 to 1999, it was the headquarters for A&M Records and the location of A&M Recording Studios. From 2000 to 2024, it served as headquarters of The Jim Henson Company, including the Henson Soundstage and Henson Recording Studios. In November 2024, the property was purchased by musician John Mayer and film/TV producer McG who, at the start of 2026, restored the facility’s name to Chaplin Studios.

== History ==
=== Construction ===
In October 1917, Charlie Chaplin announced plans to build his own film studio at the southeast corner of La Brea and Sunset Boulevard. In his autobiography, Chaplin described the decision as follows:

At the end of the Mutual contract, I was anxious to get started with First National, but we had no studio. I decided to buy land in Hollywood and build one. The site was the corner of Sunset and La Brea and had a very fine ten-room house and five acres of lemon, orange and peach trees. We built a perfect unit, complete with developing plant, cutting room, and offices.

Chaplin purchased the site from R.S. McClellan, who lived on the site and had a large grove of orange trees on the property. The lot had 300 feet (91 m) of frontage on Sunset and 600 feet (180 m) on La Brea, extending south to De Longpre. Chaplin announced he would make his home on the northern part of the property, and build his own motion picture plant on the south part of the property, cornering at La Brea and De Longpre. Chaplin's plans for six English-style buildings, "arranged as to give the effect of a picturesque English village street," were published in the Los Angeles Times in October 1917. The plans were prepared by the Milwaukee Building Company (Meyer & Holler), and the total investment was estimated to be in the region of $100,000. The layout of the buildings was described by the Los Angeles Times in 2002 as a "fairy-tale cottage complex." Another writer has described the style as "eccentric Peter Pan architecture."

The location was at that time a residential neighborhood, and Chaplin's application for a building permit was opposed by area residents, some of whom complained that it was too near the Hollywood High School. However, the City Council voted 8–1 to approve Chaplin's permit. Chaplin reportedly built his "English cottage-style studio" in three months beginning in November 1917, at a reported cost of only $35,000. The DVD collection titled "Chaplin Collection" includes Chaplin's 1918 film How to Make Movies, which depicts the studio's construction in time-lapse photography.

Construction of the studios was completed in approximately 1919. Chaplin preserved a large existing residence on the northern (Sunset Boulevard) end of the property, and planned to live there, but never in fact did. Various studio personnel lived there over the years, including his brother Sydney Chaplin. The "English cottages" along La Brea served as the facade for offices, a screening room, and a film laboratory. The grounds included stables, a swimming pool and tennis courts. The central part of the property, which was originally an orchard, became the backlot, where large outdoor sets were constructed. The two large open-air stages used for filming were constructed on the southern end of the property, and the rest of the facility consisted of dressing rooms, a garage, a carpenter's shed, and a film vault.

=== Chaplin Studios (1919–1952) ===
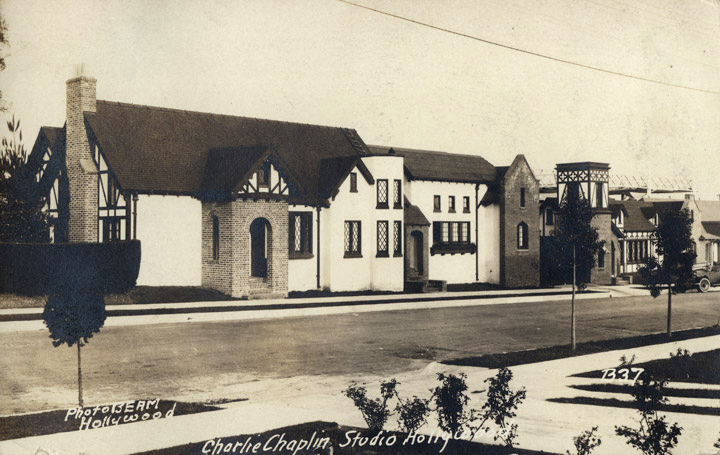
Postcard of Charlie Chaplin Studios, 1922

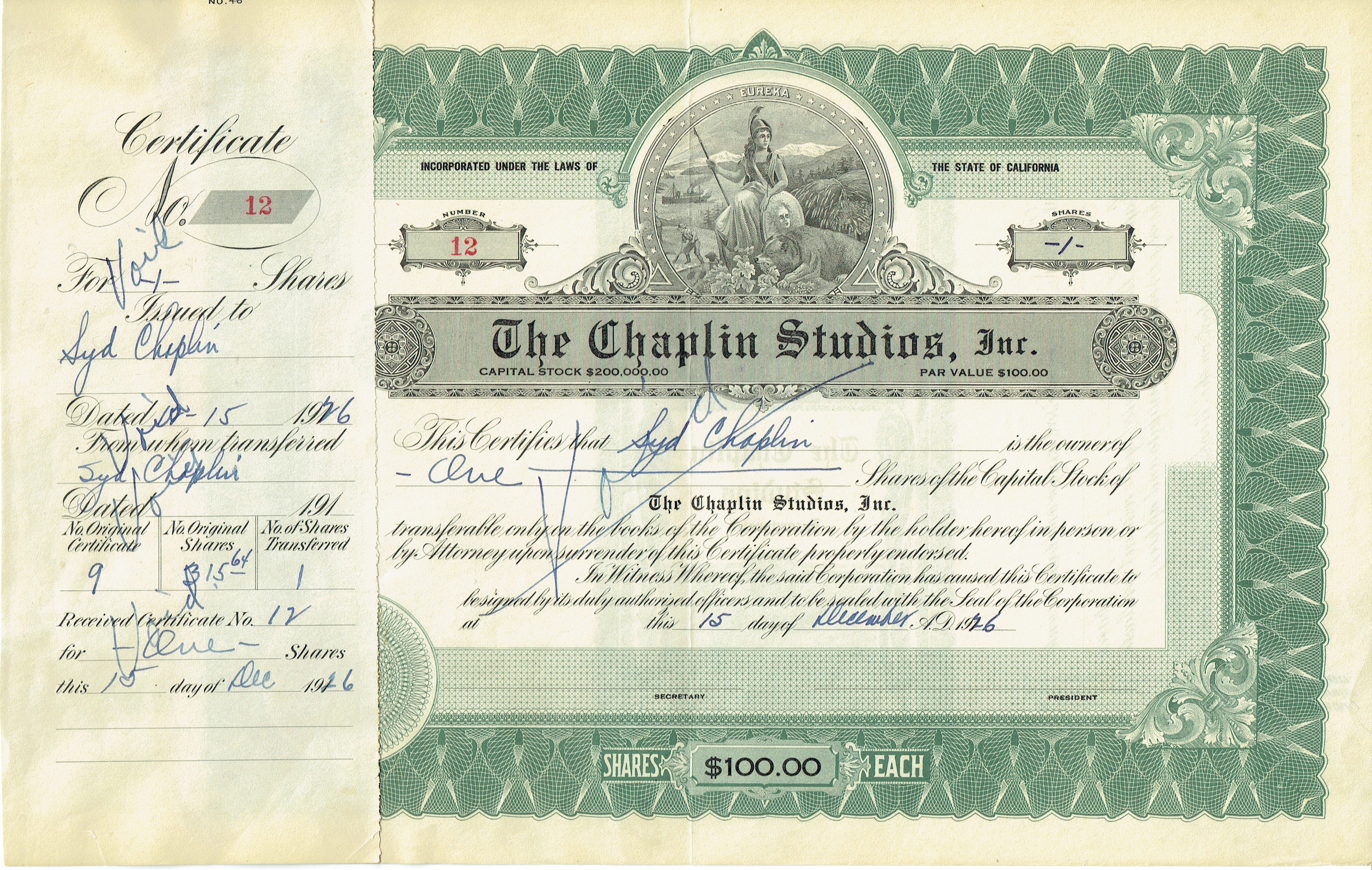
Share of the Chaplin Studios, Inc., issued 15. December 1926, assigned to Syd Chaplin

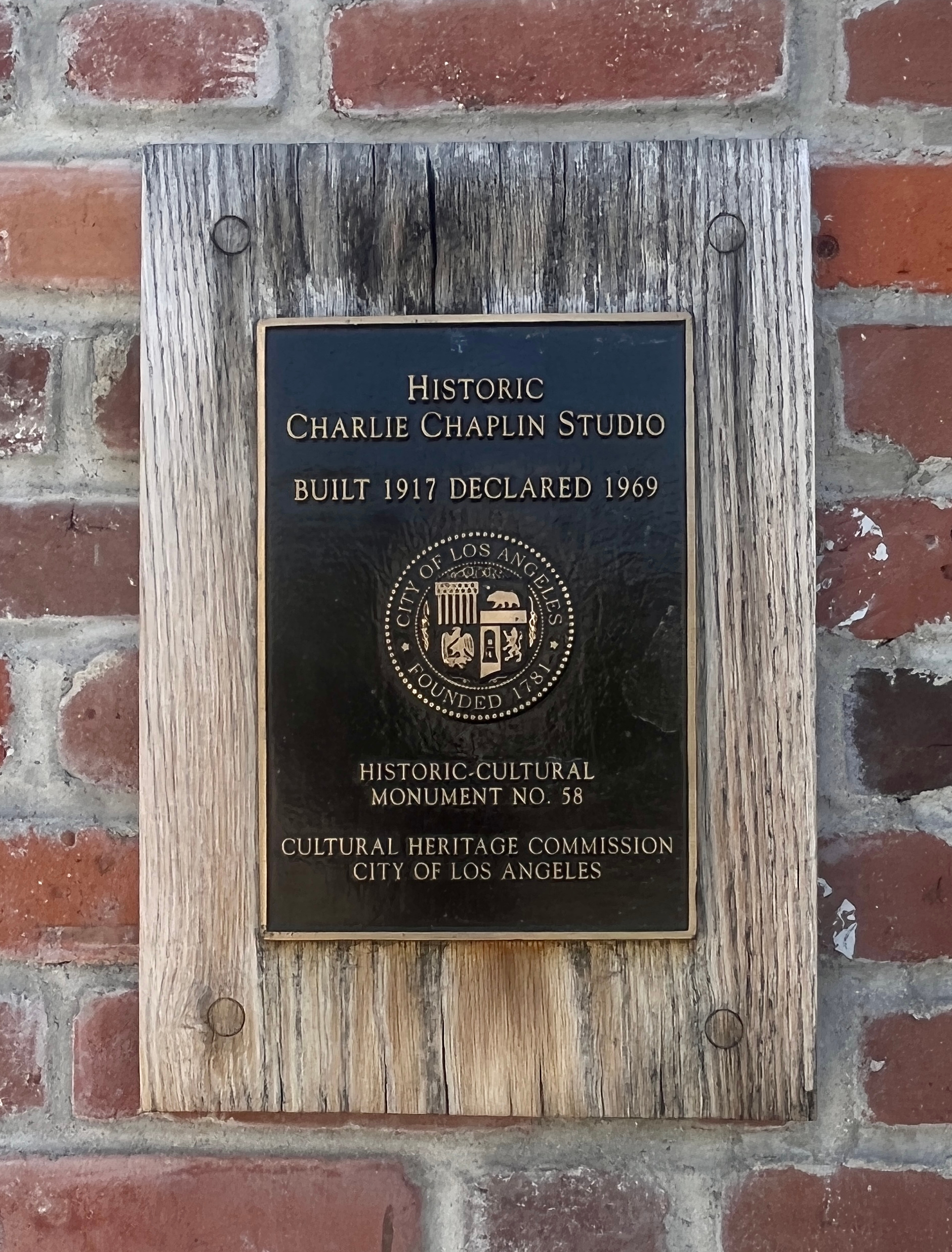
City of Los Angeles Historical-Cultural Monument No. 58 plaque

Many of Chaplin's classic films were shot at the studios, including The Kid (1921), The Gold Rush (1925), City Lights (1931), Modern Times (1936), The Great Dictator (1940), Monsieur Verdoux (1947), and Limelight (1952). Chaplin also filmed many famous visitors at his studios on La Brea, including Winston Churchill, Helen Keller, Lord Mountbatten, and Harry Lauder.

The studios saw a number of changes over the next 20 years. The two open-air stages were converted to closed soundstages in the mid-1930s, before the filming of Modern Times, and a smaller stage was also built over the site of the studio swimming pool at that time. Stage 2 had previously been seriously damaged by a fire during production of The Circus in 1927. Also, the expansion of La Brea Avenue in 1928–29 forced the physical movement of the buildings adjacent to the street back 15 feet (4.6 m) from their original locations, causing some disruption to the filming of City Lights.

In 1942, Chaplin sold the northern portion of the property, the portion containing the residence, tennis courts, and a portion of his backlot, to Safeway Stores. The house was demolished, and a shopping center was built in its place.

In October 1943, Chaplin's studios were opened up for the first time to be used to shoot an outside production, My Client Curly, released as Once Upon a Time (1944), produced by Columbia Pictures. The Los Angeles Times reported at the time that the Chaplin Studio "has been more or less sacrosanct, in the sense that outsiders were practically never permitted to work there." However, studio manager Alfred Reeves told the Times that the Chaplin organization was "not going into the space rental business," and that the use of the studios by Columbia would not create a precedent.

In 1949, the studios were reportedly the site of Greta Garbo's last screen test.

=== Television production (1953–1966) ===
Chaplin left the US in October 1952 amid political persecution and sold the studio the following year to Webb and Knapp for $650,000. The new owner had planned to tear down the studio, but it was quickly leased to a television production company and became known as Kling Studios. In 1955, it was used to shoot the Adventures of Superman television series starring George Reeves.

Beginning in 1959, Red Skelton shot his television series at the facility, and in April 1960 Skelton purchased the studio. From behind a desk in the office once occupied by Chaplin, Skelton said:

I'm not the head of the studio. I'll be president and just own the joint. ... Seriously, I couldn't be a studio executive because I'm not qualified. ... I've got a nice enough racket trying to make people laugh and don't intend to foul that up. And, besides, that's harder than running a studio.

Skelton purchased three large mobile units for taping color television shows, making a total investment estimated at $3.5 million. Skelton had a large "Skelton Studios" sign erected over the main gate on La Brea Avenue. Skelton also removed a block of sidewalk on the studio grounds into which Chaplin had signed and pressed his footprints on January 21, 1918, for display at his Palm Springs home. After Skelton's death in 1997, the block was donated to the Skelton Museum collection at Vincennes University.

In 1957, William Hanna and Joseph Barbera established H-B Productions, later Hanna-Barbera Productions, at the Chaplin Studios. The Ruff and Reddy Show, the Emmy-winning Huckleberry Hound Show, The Quick Draw McGraw Show, The Flintstones, Top Cat, The Jetsons and other classic cartoons were animated in this location, before relocating to Cahuenga Blvd in Hollywood.

Skelton sold the studio to CBS in 1962, and CBS shot the Perry Mason television series there from 1962 to 1966.

Chaplin Studios were designated as a Los Angeles Historic-Cultural Monument in February 1969. At the time, Carl Dentzel, the President of the Los Angeles Cultural Heritage Board, said the property was one of the few locations from old Hollywood that retained a complete early-day production layout. Dentzel also noted Chaplin's "studio was one of the first to be established here and by some quirk of fate continuity from the movies' earliest times to today's television and recordings demands has persevered." The studio was only the second entertainment-related building to receive the Historic-Cultural Monument designation after Grauman's Chinese Theatre.

The elderly Chaplin briefly revisited his former studio in April 1972, when he made his only return trip to America to accept an honorary Academy Award. A&M had hoped to welcome him back with a ceremony, but instead he chose to avoid the attention and arranged to drive by the studio gates on a weekend. In April 1989, the organization "Hollywood Heritage" celebrated the 100th anniversary of Chaplin's birth with a rare screening of Chaplin's 1918 documentary How to Make Movies and The Kid, both shown at the Chaplin Stage at A&M Records. Chaplin's son, Sydney, received a plaque at the screening honoring his father's achievements. For the 1992 biopic Chaplin, an exterior set of the studio office buildings was constructed among the orange groves north of Los Angeles at Fillmore, Route 126 between Ventura and Valencia. The actual studio is shown near the end of the film, where Chaplin's limousine is depicted stopping at the gates in 1972.

=== A&M Records (1967–1999) ===
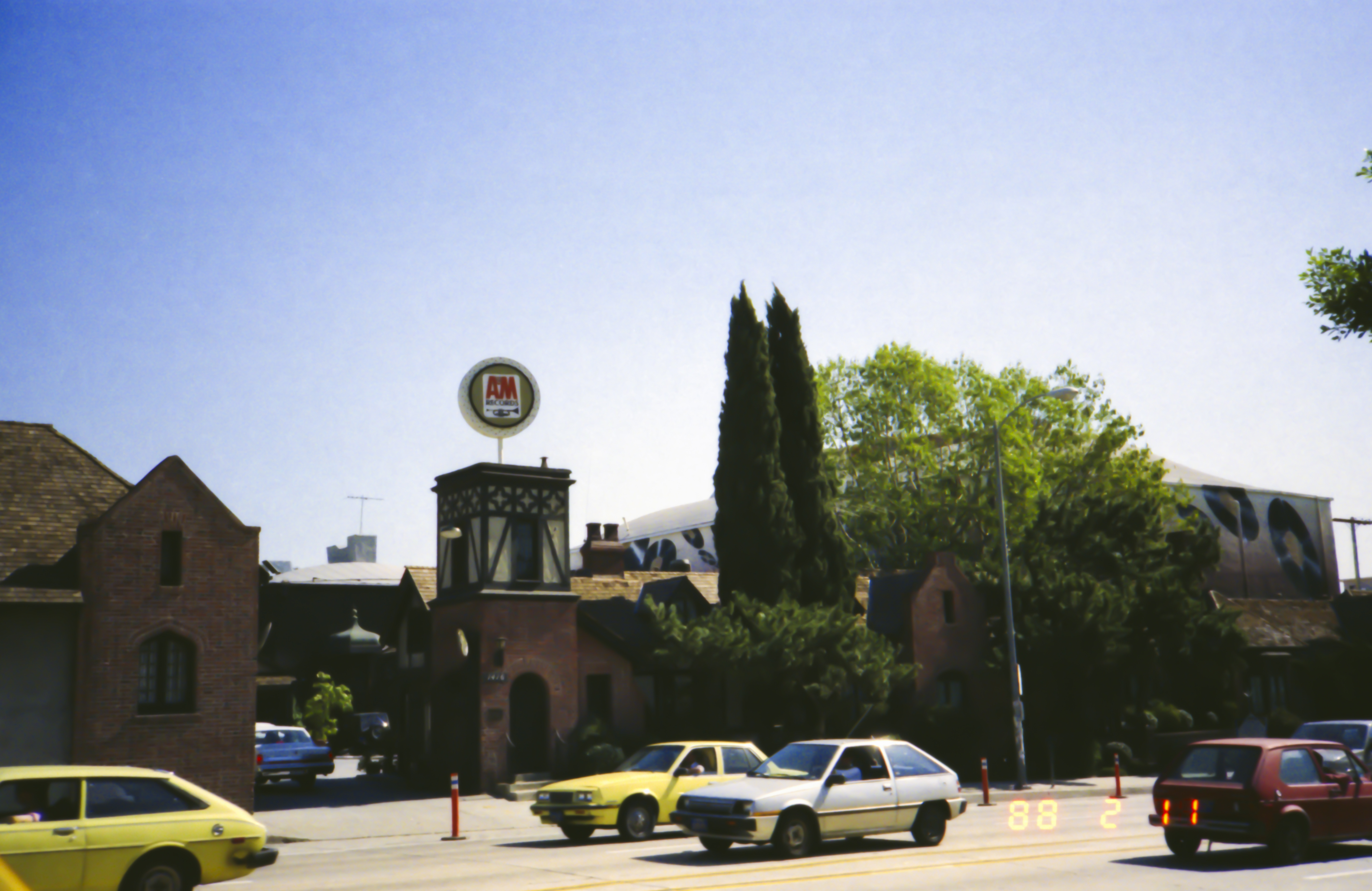
A&M Studios Main Gate, February 1988

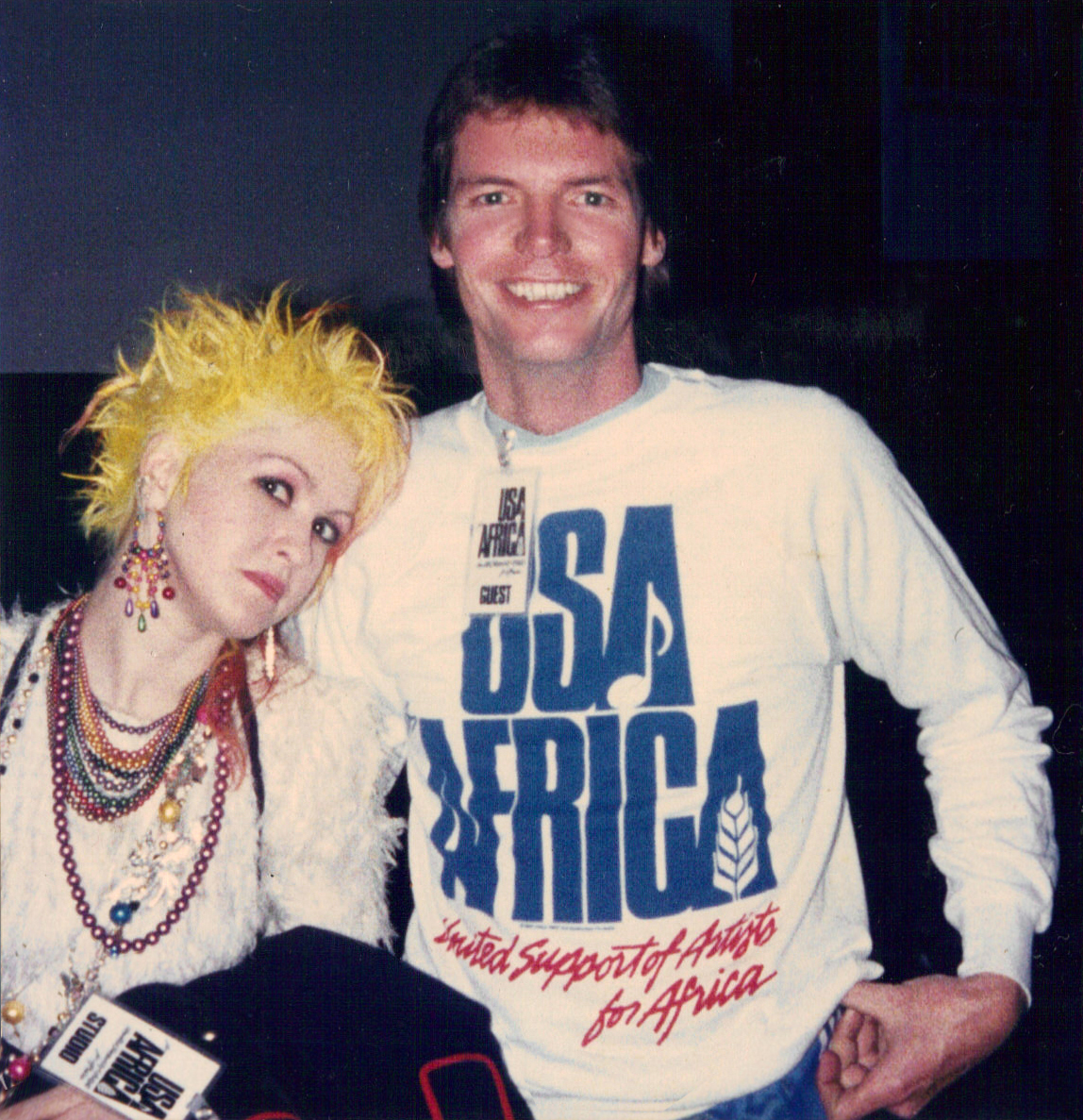
Cyndi Lauper with studio badge and photographer Glenn Francis with sweatshirt given to all attendees at A&M Studios on January 28, 1985

In 1966, Herb Alpert and Jerry Moss purchased Chaplin's studios from CBS to serve as a headquarters for A&M Records. A&M Records had grown from $500,000 in revenues in 1964 to $30 million in 1967. Alpert and Moss reportedly "astonished the big network by having their bank deliver a cashier's check for more than $1 million, the full amount." A&M converted two of the old sound stages and Chaplin's swimming pool into recording studios. A 1968 profile on Alpert and Moss described their renovation of Chaplin's old studios: "The old sound stages are in the process of being completely rebuilt into what must be the most luxurious and pleasant recording studios in the world. Chaplin's cement footprints are one of the few reminders of the past.

The first recording session at the new studios was Sérgio Mendes and Brasil '66 for the album Fool on the Hill (1968). Other artists recording at A&M Studios in its early years included Herb Alpert & the Tijuana Brass, and Burt Bacharach. In 1969 A&M signed the Carpenters, and the duo recorded almost exclusively at A&M Studios over the course of their career. The studio attracted non-A&M Records clients as well, like Joni Mitchell, who recorded her sophomore studio album Clouds at the studio in 1969, and would go on to record 13 of her 19 studio albums there.

The studio hired Bernie Grundman as an in-house mastering engineer, and he worked at A&M Studios until establishing his own mastering studio in 1984. During Grundman's tenure, numerous albums were mixed or mastered at A&M, including U2's Rattle and Hum and Prince's Controversy.

In 1970, all of A&M's studios were upgraded to 16 tracks. The following year, Carole King recorded her Grammy award-winning and bestselling album Tapestry at the studios at the same time as Mitchell was recording Blue and the Carpenters were recording Carpenters. The final mix of the live recordings for George Harrison & Friends' The Concert for Bangladesh album and corresponding documentary film was carried out in A&M Studios by A&M engineers Norman Kinney and Steve Mitchell. by A&M Studios engineers Norman Kinney and Steve Mitchell. Other artists recording at A&M Studios in the 1970s included England Dan & John Ford Coley, John Lennon, Billy Preston, Supertramp, the Tubes, George Harrison, Johnny Mathis, Quincy Jones, Barbra Streisand, and Captain & Tennille.

In 1982 Lionel Richie recorded his debut solo album at A&M Studios. In 1985, the final night of recording for the hit charity single "We Are the World" took place in A&M's Studio A. Participants included Richie, Stevie Wonder, Kenny Rogers, Tina Turner, Billy Joel, Michael Jackson, Diana Ross, Dionne Warwick, Bruce Springsteen, Huey Lewis, Cyndi Lauper, Bob Dylan, and Ray Charles among many others. Many of the participants came from an American Music Awards ceremony held that night, with the recording session not finishing until 8 a.m. the next morning.

In 1986, A&M installed the AIR Montserrat Neve mixing console in Studio A. The console, custom-built for George Martin's recording studio, is believed to be the last original desk ever built by Rupert Neve.

Other recording artists recording at A&M in the 1980s included Heart, Toto, Peter Frampton, Bon Jovi, Pink Floyd, Phil Collins, Don Henley, Melissa Etheridge, Cher, U2, and Richard Marx.

In 1991, Guns N' Roses recorded portions of Use Your Illusion I and Use Your Illusion II at A&M. Other recording artists recording at A&M in the 1990s included Jon Bon Jovi, Kiss, Mötley Crüe, Nine Inch Nails, Anthrax, Poison, Ozzy Osbourne, Soundgarden, Korn, Insane Clown Posse, Melissa Etheridge, Aerosmith, Michael Bolton, Oingo Boingo, No Doubt, Take That.

=== The Jim Henson Company (2000–2024) ===
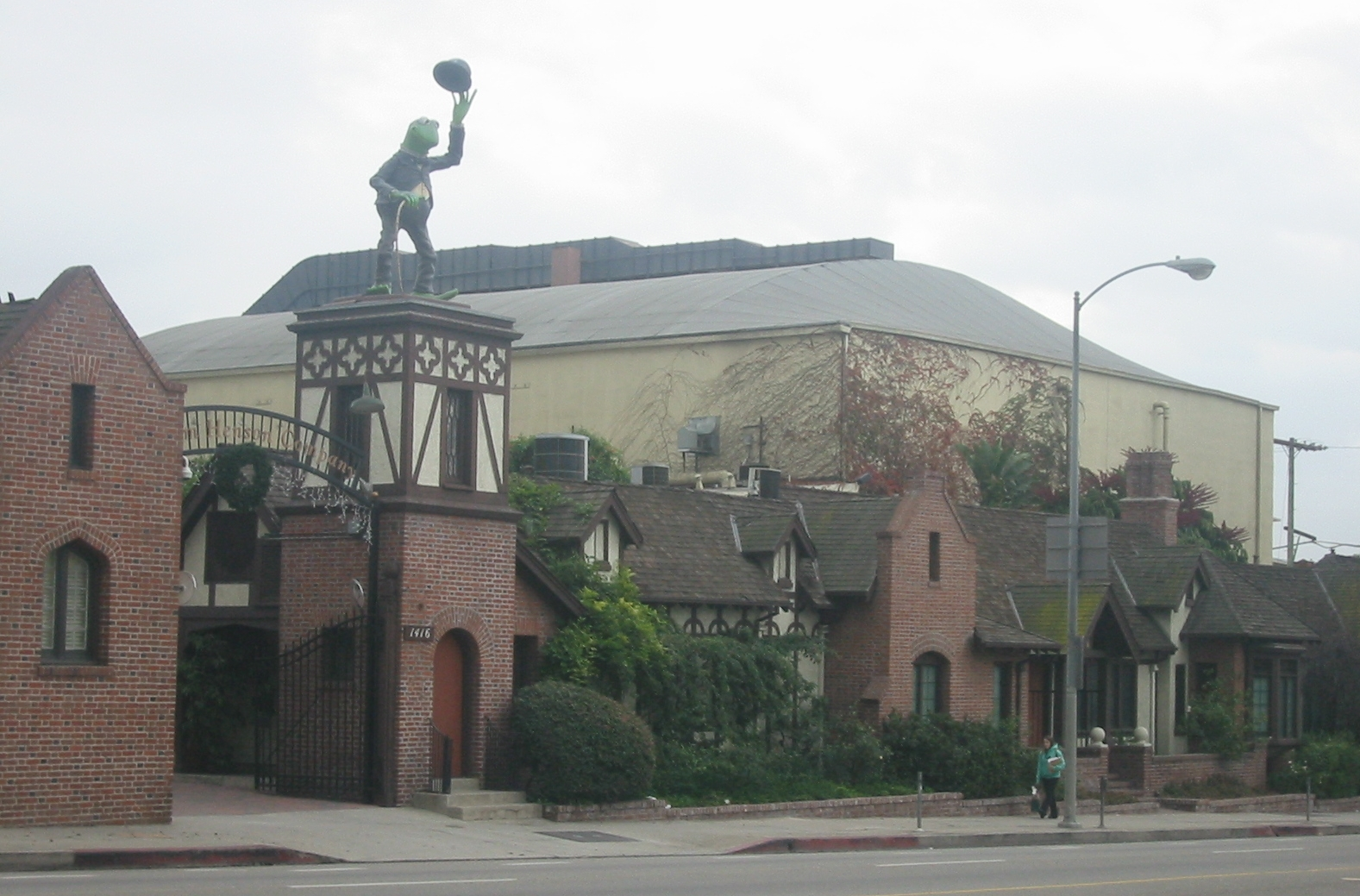
Henson Studios Main Gate, 2006

In 1999, Jim Henson's children purchased the studio for $12.5 million to serve as the new home of The Jim Henson Company. Henson's daughter, Lisa Henson, said, "The buildings are a lovable hodge-podge of quirky, unusual spaces. There are unexpected elements in some of the offices like original vaults and fish tank-like bathrooms. It's not your typical corporate space, but it's ideal for the Muppets." At a ceremony in June 2000, the Henson Company unveiled a 12-foot (3.7 m) color statue of Kermit the Frog, dressed as Chaplin's character The Tramp, above the studio's main gate. Henson's son, Brian Henson, said at the time, "When we heard that the Chaplin lot was for sale, we had to have it. It's the perfect home for the Muppets and our particular brand of classy, but eccentric entertainment. When people walk onto our lot, they fall in love with Hollywood again."

During 2002 and 2003, the soundtrack for the video games Dragon Ball Z: Budokai and Dragon Ball Z: Budokai 2 were recorded at the studio with Kenji Yamamoto as the lead producer and featured members of Tower of Power and Toto as collaborators on the soundtrack.

In 2007, the Sci-Fi Channel series Ghost Hunters shot an episode at the studios, reporting on ghost stories told for years by employees working on the lot.

On February 1, 2010, "We Are the World" was re-recorded at the studios for "We Are the World 25 for Haiti" to benefit victims of the Haiti earthquake.

The lot was used as the set for the abandoned Muppet Studios in the 2011 film The Muppets. The same year, Van Halen's comeback (and ultimately final) album, A Different Kind of Truth, was recorded in Studio C with producer John Shanks. On February 1, 2012, they performed live at Henson Studios to a celebrity-packed crowd, adding to the performance legend of the studio.

Henson Recording Studios was also one of the places where punk rock band the Offspring recorded their ninth studio album, Days Go By (2012), with producer Bob Rock.

Alice in Chains recorded three albums at the studios: 2009's Black Gives Way To Blue, 2013's The Devil Put Dinosaurs Here and 2018's Rainier Fog.

Seether also recorded their 2014 album Isolate and Medicate at Henson Recording Studios. Other recording artists recording at Henson Studios in the 2000s and 2010s included Lindsay Lohan, David Lee Roth, Avenged Sevenfold, Westlife, Daft Punk, Paul McCartney, the Eagles, Alicia Keys, Mariah Carey, Justin Timberlake, and Pearl Jam.

John Mayer recorded his 2021 album Sob Rock at the studios and filmed a performance video for a ballad arrangement of his song "Last Train Home" there.

On June 20, 2024, The Jim Henson Company announced they were planning to sell the Jim Henson Company Lot as "part of a much longer-term strategy to have The Jim Henson Company and our renowned Burbank-based Jim Henson's Creature Shop under one roof, which is not feasible in Hollywood due to the space the Shop requires." That November, it was announced that musician John Mayer and film/TV producer McG had purchased the property; the purchase was finalized in 2026. The Kermit the Frog statue will be donated to the Center for Puppetry Arts.

=== Return to Chaplin Studios (2026) ===
In January 2026, following the finalization of the purchase by Mayer and McG, the studio's name was restored to its original name, Chaplin. In a statement, they referred to their partnership an "arranged marriage" and felt that restoring the Chaplin name was giving it a "second life". Two months later, it was revealed they both invested US$44 million into the property, with those hopes of those visiting and occupying the lot would collaborate in an authentic way.

== Facilities ==
=== Recording Studios ===
The recording studios on the lot, originally established as A&M Studios and later operating as Henson Recording Studios, currently known as the Chaplin Recording Studios, consists of four studio suites and a mixing suite.

=== Soundstage ===
There is a sound stage on the lot, which has been known as the Chaplin Stage, A&M Sound Stage, and Henson Soundstage.

During A&M's tenure, it was used to film music videos, including "Every Breath You Take" by the Police and "Ghostbusters" by Ray Parker Jr. In addition, Soul Train was taped there from 1981 to 1985. The album Blonde by Frank Ocean was also partially recorded there.

== See also ==
- Los Angeles Historic-Cultural Monuments in Hollywood
