= Take It to the Floor =

Studio album by Cash Cash
- Released: December 23, 2008
- Recorded: January 2007 – October 2008
- Studios: Anntenna, Burbank, CA; Digital Heart Beat, Roseland, NJ; Fresh Kills, New York, NY
- Genres: Pop-punk; synth-pop; dance-pop; neon pop; electropop; pop rock
- Length: 39:33
- Label: Universal Republic
- Producers: Cash Cash; Sam Hollander; Dave Katz; Matt Mahaffey; Jeff Turzo

Cash Cash chronology
Cash Cash (2008)	Take It to the Floor (2008)	Love or Lust (2011)

Singles from Take It to the Floor
- 1. "Party In Your Bedroom" Released: April 14, 2009

Take It to the Floor is the debut album by the American electronic music group Cash Cash. It was released on December 23, 2008, through Universal Republic Records. The album peaked at number 31 on the US Billboard Heatseekers Albums chart. The album is supported by its only single, "Party In Your Bedroom", released in April 2009.

== Background ==
The group began recording Take It to the Floor in January 2007. The album was recorded in Anntenna Studios, Digital Heart Beat Studios and Fresh Kills Studio. All 12 tracks were mixed by the group's lead vocalist, Jean Paul Makhlouf in his home studio. The band originally finished recording by August 2008, however, unhappy with how the mixing turned out, they decided re-record the entire album in October. Some of the songs recorded in August, were put on their Cash Cash EP. The album title is taken from the lyrics of the first track "Breakout".

Musically, the album is a blend of 1970's funk, '80s power-pop and '90s alternative. About the album, Jean Paul Makhlouf stated, "The biggest thing about our new record is that the inspiration was to be different for every song, and dress each song differently. We try to cater to the individual songs. Each song has its own sound, but they're all unified by the band and the songwriting."

== Promotion ==
During the winter of 2008 and 2009, the group did a Hot Topic in-store tour, performing acoustic songs and doing signings in support of the album. The group also went on tour with Metro Station and Tyga in December 2008. From January to February 2009, the band toured in the United States, with support from Millionaires and I Set My Friends On Fire. In April 2009, the band supported Kevin Rudolf on his Let it Rock Tour in the US, and played at the Bamboozle in May. The group also joined Cobra Starship on their UK tour. Between late June and late August, the band performed on the Warped Tour.

== Release ==
On December 13, 2008, it was announced on their blog that their full-length album would be out on December 23, 2008. Take It to the Floor was released digitally on December 23, and released physically on January 20, 2009, by Universal Republic Records. It features five songs previously released on their Cash Cash EP, one of them being re-recorded. The band streamed the songs "Concertca", "Sugar Rush" and "Electric Hearts" on their iLike page in December, ahead of the album's release.

"Party In Your Bedroom" was released as the album's only single and was serviced to contemporary hit radio in the United States on April 14, 2009. The music video for the song was directed by Brendan Kyle Cochrane. It was released on August 14, 2009.

== Reception ==
Professional ratings
Review scores
Source	Rating
AbsolutePunk	68%
AllMusic	3.5/5 stars
PopMatters	5/10 stars

Take It to the Floor was received with generally positive reviews from music critics. Many critics praised the track "Party In Your Bedroom" as the highlight of the album. Tim Sendra of AllMusic stated, "As evidenced by the band's one perfect moment, 'Party In Your Bedroom,' it's awesome." However, added that, "The rest of the album doesn't quite measure up to that song." Overall, he remarked, "if you want a quick and most likely short-lived blast of pop nonsense, the album is pretty brilliant." AbsolutePunk stated that the song "Party In Your Bedroom", had the most "single potential" which "utilize what a lot of radio friendly bands are using today." They also praised Alex Makhlouf's "noticeable" synth work on tracks such as "Your Love" and "Sugar Rush". However stated that the negative aspect of the album was the "many artificial instruments played on the record." Overall, they called the album, "an outstanding debut LP."

Marian Phillips of Alternative Press said the album "brought together emo and electronic music to create the ultimate synthesized sonic experience. Their iconic song 'Party In Your Bedroom' features lyrics full of desire with beats that are meant to be danced to." Aarik Danielsen of PopMatters praised the band's ability to write "huge hooks and carry themselves with enough style and confidence to score big points with teen-age listeners." He called the tracks "Party in Your Bedroom" and "Your Love" the "best tunes" from the album that "showcase a gift for melody and a creative spark that can be further harnessed." To end off, he stated, "the band could truly have something special." Seattle Post-Intelligencer wrote that the album "is purely bubble-gum, a sugary and very American release that tries to meld together featherweight rock and a somewhat dated version of mainstream pop, with electronica fused in here and there, almost as an afterthought."

== Track listing ==
No.	Title	Length
1.	"Breakout"	3:34
2.	"Sugar Rush"	3:05
3.	"Party In Your Bedroom"	3:19
4.	"Cash Cash"	3:09
5.	"Can't Stop Looking"	2:47
6.	"Electric Hearts"	3:35
7.	"Interlude"	2:33
8.	"Concerta" (re-recorded)	3:24
9.	"Two Days Old"	3:19
10.	"Your Love"	2:56
11.	"Radio"	4:13
12.	"Dynamite"	3:39
Total length:		39:33

== Personnel ==
Credits for Take It to the Floor adapted from AllMusic and album's liner notes.

Cash Cash

- Jean Paul Makhlouf – lead vocals, guitar, mixing
- Alex Luke Makhlouf – keyboard, programming, backing vocals
- Sam Frisch – bass, backing vocals, programming, package design
- Anthony Villacari – drums

Production

- S*A*M and SLUGGO – producer, engineer, co-writer ("Party in Your Bedroom")
- Jeff Turzo and Matt Mahaffey – producer, engineer, keyboards
- Ted Jenson – mastering
- Mike Doerr – photo editing
- Kellyann Petry – photography
- Nicholas Routzen – inlay photography
- Ben Adelson – A&R

== Charts ==
Chart performance for Take It to the Floor
Chart (2009)	Peak position
US Heatseekers Albums (Billboard)	31

== Release history ==
Release history and formats for Take It to the Floor
Region	Date	Format	Label	Ref.
Various	December 23, 2008	CD	Universal Republic	
Various	January 20, 2009	Digital download	Universal Republic	
