= Hold On Tight (R3hab and Conor Maynard song) =

Single by R3hab and Conor Maynard
- Released: May 4, 2018
- Recorded: 2018
- Genre: EDM
- Length: 3:09
- Label: R3hab Music
- Songwriters: Fadil El Ghoul, Connor Maynard
- Producer: Fadil El Ghoul

R3hab singles chronology
"We Do" (2018)	"Hold On Tight" (2018)	"What You Do" (2018)

Conor Maynard singles chronology
"All My Love" (2017)	"Hold on Tight" (2018)	"Pray" (2019)

"Hold on Tight" is an electronic single by Dutch DJ and record producer R3hab and English singer Conor Maynard, who also co-wrote the song. The track became the third number one single in the United States for R3hab and Maynard's first on Billboard's Dance Club Songs chart, reaching the summit in its August 11, 2018 issue.

== Track listing ==
Digital download – Single
No.	Title	Length
1.	"Hold on Tight" (R3hab & Conor Maynard)	3:09

== Charts ==
=== Weekly charts ===
Chart (2018)	Peak position
US Hot Dance/Electronic Songs (Billboard)	23
US Dance Club Songs (Billboard)	1

=== Year-end charts ===
Chart (2018)	Position
US Dance Club Songs (Billboard)	6
US Hot Dance/Electronic Songs (Billboard)	75
