= Say It Like You Feel It =

Studio album by Cash Cash
- Released: May 14, 2021
- Genre: Dance pop
- Length: 57:48
- Label: Atlantic; Big Beat
- Producer: Cash Cash; DallasK; Zookëper

Cash Cash chronology
Blood, Sweat & 3 Years (2016)	Say It Like You Feel It (2021)

Singles from Say It Like You Feel It
- 1. "Matches" Released: March 3, 2017; 2. "All My Love" Released: July 7, 2017; 3. "Belong" Released: December 15, 2017; 4. "Jewel" Released: February 14, 2018; 5. "Finest Hour" Released: April 12, 2018; 6. "Call You" Released: November 30, 2018; 7. "Mean It" Released: January 24, 2020; 8. "Gasoline" Released: May 15, 2020; 9. "Love You Now" Released: October 9, 2020; 10. "Too Late" Released: February 19, 2021; 11. "Ride or Die" Released: April 23, 2021

Say It Like You Feel It is the fifth studio album by American electronic music group Cash Cash, released on May 14, 2021, via Atlantic and Big Beat Records. The album has a total of 18 tracks and is their longest album to date. The group released the album cover art as an NFT on April 26, 2022. Say It Like You Feel It includes collaborations with singers Abir, Alex Newell, Brandon Colbein, Conor Maynard, Chris Carrabba of Dashboard Confessional, Georgia Ku, Harloe, Laura White, Lukas Graham, Nasri of Magic!, Nikki Vianna, Phoebe Ryan, Rozes, Tayler Buono, Violet Days, Wrabel and rapper Wiz Khalifa.

== Background and recording ==
Group member Jean Paul Makhlouf spoke about the meaning behind the album's name. He stated:

"The title speaks to the overarching theme. Say what you feel. Don't hold your emotions back. You have to be able to express yourself, what you believe, and what you think. If you're going to say something, let it all out. If you're going to do something, be sure to do it all the way."

JP Makhlouf noted that the song selections for the album came together naturally. He also said that the album was a "form of therapy" for the group. The group recorded the album in their home studio.

== Artwork ==
On April 22, 2021, the group unveiled the artwork for the album. The album cover design features original drawings hand drawn and created by the band. The cover also features original quotes written by the group as well as selected Cash Cash lyrics. The group released the artwork as an NFT on April 26, 2022.

== Singles ==
"Matches" was released on March 3, 2017, as the lead single from the album. According to JP Makhlouf, the song is considered "relatable" and "nostalgic". The song peaked at number 38 on the Hot Dance/Electronic Songs chart.

"All My Love" was released on July 7, 2017, as the second single from the album. The song peaked at number 23 on the Hot Dance/Electronic Songs chart. The song reached number 74 on the Billboard Hot Dance/Electronic Songs year-end chart in 2017. The music video was released on October 5, 2017.

"Belong" was released on December 15, 2017, as the third single from the album. The music video was released that same day.

"Jewel" was released on February 14, 2018, as the fourth single from the album. The song peaked at number 35 on the Hot Dance/Electronic Songs chart.

"Finest Hour" was released on April 12, 2018, as the fifth single from the album. The song peaked at number 14 on the Hot Dance/Electronic Songs chart. It was serviced to dance radio on April 17. The song reached number 35 on the Billboard Hot Dance/Electronic Songs year-end chart in 2018. In January 2020, the song was certified gold in the US.

"Call You" was released on November 30, 2018, as the sixth single from the album. The song peaked at number eight on the Dance/Mix Show Airplay chart. The song reached number 29 on the Billboard Dance/Mix Show Airplay year-end chart in 2019.

"Mean It" was released on January 24, 2020, as the seventh single from the album. The song peaked at number four on the Dance/Mix Show Airplay chart. The song reached number 48 on the Billboard Dance/Mix Show Airplay year-end chart in 2020.

"Gasoline" was released on May 15, 2020, as the eighth single from the album. The song peaked at number 36 on the Hot Dance/Electronic Songs chart. The song reached number 40 on the Billboard Dance/Mix Show Airplay year-end chart in 2020.

"Love You Now" was released on October 9, 2020, as the ninth single from the album. The song peaked at number 45 on the Hot Dance/Electronic Songs chart.

"Too Late" was released on February 12, 2021, as the tenth single from the album. The song peaked at number 14 on the Hot Dance/Electronic Songs chart. The song reached number 68 on the Billboard Hot Dance/Electronic Songs year-end chart in 2021.

"Ride or Die" was released on April 23, 2021, as the eleventh and final single from the album. The song peaked at number 29 on the Hot Dance/Electronic Songs chart.

"42" peaked at number 41 on the Hot Dance/Electronic Songs chart despite not being released as a single.

== Reception ==
Professional ratings
Review scores
Source	Rating
Riff Magazine	9/10 stars

Gabrielle Poccia of Riff Magazine called the album "a smokey, dry-ice-filled breath of fresh air". She added, "Say It Like You Feel It is an impressive work of pop music and emotion. It's the perfect album to dance yourself clean." Maggie Cocco of Melodic Magazine said, "Say It Like You Feel It has all the hallmarks you've come to expect of a good pop infused EDM album. The music drives, builds, and drops in a satisfyingly familiar cadence beneath sticky vocal hooks." Cameron Defaria of Dancing Astronaut stated that the album was "a glowing product that highlights Cash Cash's glimmering production style from start to finish across 18 cuts."

== Track listing ==
No.	Title	Length
1.	"42"	2:48
2.	"Too Late" (featuring Wiz Khalifa and Lukas Graham)	3:13
3.	"Ride or Die" (featuring Phoebe Ryan)	3:08
4.	"Finest Hour" (featuring Abir)	3:35
5.	"Practice" (featuring Tayler Buono)	3:21
6.	"Paris in New York" (featuring Brandon Colbein)	2:37
7.	"Talk About It" (featuring Harloe)	3:19
8.	"Belong" (with Dashboard Confessional)	2:57
9.	"Black"	3:27
10.	"Reforget" (featuring Violet Days)	3:28
11.	"Call You" (featuring Nasri of Magic!)	3:39
12.	"The Feels" (featuring Alex Newell)	3:26
13.	"Mean It" (featuring Wrabel)	3:10
14.	"All My Love" (featuring Conor Maynard)	3:11
15.	"Matches" (featuring Rozes)	3:07
16.	"Gasoline" (featuring Laura White)	3:29
17.	"Love You Now" (featuring Georgia Ku)	2:55
18.	"Jewel" (featuring Nikki Vianna)	2:58
Total length:		57:48

== Personnel ==
Credits for Say It Like You Feel It adapted from AllMusic.

Cash Cash

- Samuel Frisch – composer, mastering, mixing, producer, programming, recording
- Alex Makhlouf – composer, mastering, mixing, producer, programming, recording
- Jean Paul Makhlouf – backing vocals, composer, mastering, mixing, producer, programming, recording

Additional musicians

- Abir – composer, featured artist
- Nasri – featured artist
- Tayler Buono – featured artist
- Chris Carrabba – composer, featured artist
- Brandon Colbein – featured artist
- Harloe – featured artist
- Georgia Ku – composer, featured artist
- Lukas Graham – featured artist
- Conor Maynard – featured artist
- Alex Newell – featured artist
- Rozes – composer featured artist, vocals
- Phoebe Ryan – featured artist
- Nikki Vianna – featured artist
- Violet Days – featured artist
- Laura White – featured artist
- Wiz Khalifa – featured artist
- Zookëper – composer, drum programming, keyboards, producer, programming

Production

- James Abrahart – composer
- Ben Berger – composer
- Evan Bogart – composer
- Captain Cuts – vocal producer
- Ben Castillo – recording
- Leroy Clampitt – composer
- David Dalton – composer
- Lukas Forchhammer – composer
- Grace Fulmer – composer
- Frank Hendler – composer
- Joe Janiak – composer
- Nathanial John – composer
- Ari Leff – composer
- Dijon McFarlane – composer
- Ryan McMahon – composer
- Michael Pollack – composer
- Ryan Rabin – composer
- Cameron Thomaz – composer
- Henrik Wolsing – composer

== Charts ==
Chart performance for Say It Like You Feel It
Chart (2021)	Peak position
Japanese Download Albums (Billboard Japan)	88
