= All My Love (Cash Cash song) =

Single by Cash Cash featuring Conor Maynard

from the album Say It Like You Feel It
- Released: July 7, 2017
- Genre: Tropical house
- Length: 3:11
- Label: Big Beat
- Songwriters: Ari Leff; Michael Pollack; Alexander Makhlouf; Grace Fulmer; Jean Paul Makhlouf; Samuel Frisch
- Producer: Cash Cash

Cash Cash singles chronology
"Matches" (2017)	"All My Love" (2017)	"Belong" (2017)

Conor Maynard singles chronology
"Understand Me" (2017)	"All My Love" (2017)	"Hold on Tight" (2018)

Music video
- "All My Love" on YouTube

"All My Love" is a song by American EDM trio Cash Cash featuring British singer-songwriter Conor Maynard. It was released on July 7, 2017, by Big Beat. The song appears on the band's fifth studio album Say It Like You Feel It and is the album's second single.

== Background ==
Cash Cash first started with creating the song, before sending it to Conor Maynard. He ended up falling "in love" with the song and agreed to sing on the track. Jean Paul Makhlouf said the process of putting it together was "really easy" and that Maynard managed to cut the track and send it back to the group in one day. He also described the song as "emotional."

Cash Cash said of teaming up with Maynard: "Making 'All My Love' with Conor was a very natural collaboration," and group added: "We attached the production with a hyped energetic feel to give some contrast to the lyrics and we're very pleased with the way they complimented each other. The emotion in his voice really brought out the concept of the song and gave us chills when we first listened back."

== Composition ==
"All My Love" was written by Ari Leff, Michael Pollack, Alexander Makhlouf, Grace Fulmer, Jean Paul Makhlouf and Samuel Frisch, while production was handled by Cash Cash. Billboard described the production as "a warm, lush complexion" featuring "pulsating synths" and a "tropical beat at the drop."

== Remixes ==
A remix by Sagan premiered via Dancing Astronaut on August 17, 2017. Soon after, a remix by Audien premiered via Billboard on October 5. The following day, a remixes EP was released for digital download.

== Music video ==
The video was published on October 5, 2017. A woman consoles her heartbroken friend with ice cream, takeout and a sexy girls' night in, with pizza, burgers and sweets. And Jean, Alex and Sam make cameos as delivery boys, while Maynard plays a snubbed suitor.

== Track listing ==
Digital download
No.	Title	Length
1.	"All My Love" (feat. Conor Maynard)	3:11

Digital download – remixes EP
No.	Title	Length
1.	"All My Love" (feat. Conor Maynard) (Audien remix)	3:24
2.	"All My Love" (feat. Conor Maynard) (Henry Fong remix)	3:32
3.	"All My Love" (feat. Conor Maynard) (Shaun Frank remix)	3:56
4.	"All My Love" (feat. Conor Maynard) (Triarchy remix)	3:06
5.	"All My Love" (feat. Conor Maynard) (Sagan remix)	3:24
6.	"All My Love" (feat. Conor Maynard) (Chris Schambacher remix)	3:18
7.	"All My Love" (feat. Conor Maynard) (Misha K remix)	4:44
8.	"All My Love" (feat. Conor Maynard) (Havok Roth remix)	3:13
9.	"All My Love" (feat. Conor Maynard) (Mark Villa remix)	3:58
10.	"All My Love" (feat. Conor Maynard) (BOXINBOX & Lionsize remix)	3:20

== Personnel ==
Credits for "All My Love" adapted from the digital liner notes.

Cash Cash

- Jean Paul Makhlouf – composer, mastering, mixing, producer, programming
- Alex Makhlouf – composer, mastering, mixing, producer, programming
- Samuel Frisch – composer, mastering, mixing, producer, programming

Additional musicians

- Conor Maynard – featured artist, vocals

== Charts ==
=== Weekly charts ===
Weekly chart performance for "All My Love"
Chart (2017)	Peak position
Belgium (Ultratip Bubbling Under Wallonia)	4
UK Dance (Official Charts)	29
US Hot Dance/Electronic Songs (Billboard)	23

=== Year-end charts ===
Year-end chart performance for "All My Love"
Chart (2017)	Position
US Hot Dance/Electronic Songs (Billboard)	74

== Release history ==
Release dates and formats for "All My Love"
Region	Date	Format(s)	Label	Ref.
Various	July 7, 2017	Digital download; streaming	Big Beat	
