= New Light (song) =

Single by John Mayer

from the album Sob Rock
- Released: May 10, 2018
- Recorded: 2018
- Genre: Power pop • Pop rock
- Label: Snack Money; Columbia
- Songwriters: John Mayer; Ernest Wilson
- Producers: John Mayer; No I.D.

John Mayer singles chronology
"In the Blood" (2017)	"New Light" (2018)	"I Guess I Just Feel Like" (2019)

Music video
- "New Light" on YouTube

"New Light" is a song co-written and recorded by American singer-songwriter John Mayer. It was released as the lead single from his eighth studio album Sob Rock on May 10, 2018 and was released to Hot AC and Triple A radio on June 18, 2018. It was written and produced by Mayer and No I.D.

== Release and promotion ==
Mayer took to Instagram to tease new music, saying "Summer bop drop imminent" on May 8, 2018 and announced the release of the new single "New Light" on May 9. The next day, Mayer premiered the song on Apple Music's Beats 1 radio with Zane Lowe.

== Music video ==
On May 23, Mayer shared the trailer for the song's music video. The video directed by Fatal Farm premiered on May 24 and Mayer joked about it on Instagram, saying, "I needed to make a video for 'New Light' but nobody could agree on a budget, so I went to a place downtown and made this with a company that usually does birthday and Bar Mitzvah videos."

The tongue-in-cheek video opens with Mayer standing in front of the green screen wearing pajamas and a Moon hoodie from the Japanese brand Kapital, saying, "I'm John Mayer and I'm ready to be a star." It then features Mayer dancing, playing the guitar and waving to fake zebras at various green screen locations, from the cheap apartment kitchen to the Egyptian pyramids. It ends with Mayer blowing a kiss to the audience.

== Critical reception ==
The song received generally positive reviews from music critics. Jon Blisten from Rolling Stone said the song crafted "a steady groove reminiscent of Eighties blue-eyed soul and tinged with disco guitars" and praised Mayer's "cheeky and earnest" lyrics. Billboard ranked "New Light" 27th in their list "The 50 Best Songs of 2018 (So Far)" published in June, calling the song "a sublimely silky pastel palette of keyboard twinkles and polished guitar licks that sounds like it was recorded in the clouds of John's Paradise Valley LP cover." Complex ranked the song 31st in their "The Best Songs of 2018" mid-year list. Their review by Matt Welty said "Mayer put out a legitimate banger in 'New Light,' an '80s-inspired track that still has the introspective side we've come to know and love from the singer/songwriter," stating they see the song "cross over beyond his traditional fan base".

== Commercial performance ==
The song debuted at number 38 on Billboard Hot Rock Songs. Following its first full week of digital sales and streaming, it jumped to number 7 on Hot Rock Songs and opened at number 5 on Bubbling Under Hot 100. After officially impacting Hot Adult Contemporary radio, it debuted at number 39 on Adult Top 40 chart. In Mexico, the song reached number 1 and was the second best selling-single of 2018. The song is also Mayer’s most-streamed track.

== Remix ==
The Zookëper remix of "New Light" was released on August 9, 2018.

== Personnel ==
- John Mayer – vocals, guitar
- Pino Palladino – bass
- Aaron Sterling – drums

Production

- John Mayer – producer
- No I.D. – producer
- Chad Franscoviak – recording engineer
- Martin Pradler – digital editor
- Spike Stent – mixing engineer
- Randy Merrill – mastering engineer

== Charts ==
=== Weekly charts ===
Chart (2018)	Peak position
Belgium (Ultratip Bubbling Under Flanders)	13
Mexico Anglo (Monitor Latino)	14
Mexico Ingles Airplay (Billboard)	1
Netherlands (Dutch Top 40)	29
Netherlands (Single Top 100)	46
New Zealand Heatseekers (RMNZ)	7
US Bubbling Under Hot 100 (Billboard)	5
US Adult Alternative Airplay (Billboard)	9
US Adult Contemporary (Billboard)	30
US Adult Pop Airplay (Billboard)	10
US Digital Song Sales (Billboard)	14
US Hot Rock & Alternative Songs (Billboard)	7

=== Year-end charts ===
Chart (2018)	Position
Iceland (Plötutíóindi)	48
Netherlands (Single Top 100)	92
US Adult Top 40 (Billboard)	40
US Hot Rock Songs (Billboard)	14

== Certifications ==
Region	Certification	Certified units/sales
Australia (ARIA)	Gold	35,000^{‡}
Canada (Music Canada)	Gold	40,000^{‡}
Denmark (IFPI Danmark)	Platinum	90,000^{‡}
Italy (FIMI)	Gold	35,000^{‡}
Mexico (AMPROFON)	3× Platinum	180,000^{‡}
Netherlands (NVPI)	Platinum	80,000^{‡}
New Zealand (RMNZ)	2× Platinum	60,000^{‡}
Norway (IFPI Norway)	Gold	30,000^{‡}
Spain (Promusicae)	Platinum	60,000^{‡}
Switzerland (IFPI Switzerland)	Gold	10,000^{‡}
United Kingdom (BPI)	Silver	200,000^{‡}
United States (RIAA)	2× Platinum	2,000,000^{‡}
Streaming
Sweden (GLF)	Gold	4,000,000^{†}
^{‡} Sales+streaming figures based on certification alone.^{†} Streaming-only figures based on certification alone.

== Release history ==
Region	Date	Format	Label	Ref.
Various	May 10, 2018	Digital download; streaming	Snack Money	
United States	June 18, 2018	Hot adult contemporary	Columbia	
United States	June 18, 2018	Adult album alternative	Columbia	
