= Cash Cash (EP) =

EP by Cash Cash
- Released: October 7, 2008
- Genre: Power pop; synthpop
- Length: 16:52
- Label: Universal Republic
- Producer: Cash Cash

Cash Cash chronology
Cash Cash (EP) (2008)	Take It to the Floor (2008)

Cash Cash (EP) is the debut EP by band Cash Cash. On October 7, 2008, it became available on the iTunes Store. The EP was also sold at shows and managed to sell 5,000 copies. All of the songs, with the exception of the acoustic single of "Party In Your Bedroom" and "Fairweather Friend", were later featured on their debut album Take It to the Floor.

== Background ==
In 2007, brothers Jean Paul Makhlouf and Alex Makhlouf spent an entire summer crafting new material in Jean Paul's home recording studio. In early 2008, Cash Cash signed with Universal Republic and released their self-titled EP in October. The EP was self-produced.

The song "Fairweather Friend" was taken from the EP By the Bedside which is an old EP from Cash Cash that was released in 2006. An earlier version of "Fairweather Friend", released in 2005, also appears in the album The Consequence. An early version of "Breakout" appears in both The Consequence and By the Bedside.

== Critical reception ==
Lars Hindsley of Dangerman Media gave a positive review for the EP Cash Cash. He stated, "Dense danceable songs, memorable hooks with harmony and high-energy is what you get with Cash Cash." He called the opening track Breakout "alive and a crowd pleaser, sets the tone for what's to come." He described the song as an "upbeat dance groove." He also praised the track, Party In Your Bedroom. He called the song "infectious, from the driving bass to the hook-in of the lyrics."

== Track listing ==
No.	Title	Length
1.	"Breakout" (re-recorded)	3:26
2.	"Party In Your Bedroom"	3:18
3.	"Electric Hearts"	3:34
4.	"Two Days Old"	3:19
5.	"Party In Your Bedroom" (acoustic)	3:15
6.	"Concerta"	3:16
7.	"Fairweather Friend"	3:45
8.	"Can't Stop Looking" (DJ Fbomb remix)	3:52
Total length:		27:45

== Charts ==
Chart performance for Cash Cash
Chart (2008)	Peak position
US Heatseekers Albums (Billboard)	24
