= Last Train Home (John Mayer song) =

Single by John Mayer

from the album Sob Rock
- Released: June 4, 2021
- Length: 3:07
- Label: Columbia
- Songwriter: John Mayer
- Producers: John Mayer; Don Was

John Mayer singles chronology
"Carry Me Away" (2019)	"Last Train Home" (2021)	"Shot in the Dark" (2021)

Maren Morris singles chronology
"Bigger Man" (2021)	"Last Train Home" (2021)

Music video
- "Last Train Home" on YouTube

"Last Train Home" is a song recorded by American singer-songwriter John Mayer, and featured uncredited guest vocals from American country singer Maren Morris. It was released on June 4, 2021 as the fourth single from his eighth studio album Sob Rock. John Mayer wrote the song and produced it with Don Was. The song was Mayer's first new release in nearly two years since "Carry Me Away" (2019). The song was used in the first season of the TV show The Bear.

== Background ==
John Mayer began teasing his new album with a series of TikTok videos that previewed new songs. The first song clip was "Last Train Home" on March 23, 2021, but only the first eight bars with no indication of the title. This led British musician Mary Spender to record an entire predictive version of the song the next day and release it on her YouTube channel, leading to international coverage. Mayer saw the video that day and posted his approval of the "new" version, sending Spender the official version ahead of the song's release to review before anyone else.

Mayer released "Last Train Home" on June 4, 2021, and announced that Sob Rock would be releasing on July 16 of the same year. On release day, Mayer shared four-track song lists, and he made "Last Train Home" as the lead single to release, and expressed it is "a slick rock production with an '80s polish, filled with keyboard stabs that remind of Toto, and guitar licks galore."

In an interview with The Wall Street Journal, Mayer explained the reason of the song '80s elements: "I asked myself, 'What music makes me feel like everything's going to be OK? And it's the music I listened to growing up in the '80s. There's a security-blanket aspect about that sound that reminds me of a safer time."

== Composition ==
Rob Costa of Music talkers described the intro as featuring "an 80's style synth Steve Winwood would be proud of, and conga drums mixed into the production, which is reminiscent of Toto's mega 80s hit, 'Africa.'"

== Music videos ==
An accompanying "80s vibe" music video was released on June 4, 2021, directed Cameron Duddy and Harper Smith. It also features Mayer's band, including Toto's percussionist Lenny Castro and former Toto member Greg Phillinganes. The video shows Mayer, Morris and the band "recording their live performance of the song" at Union Station, located in Los Angeles, California. The video is highly reminiscent to that of "Forever Man" by Eric Clapton. The video won the Best Rock Video at the 2021 MTV Video Music Awards, It was the first MTV Award for Mayer.

Mayer released a second video of a "ballad version" on October 28, 2021, shot at Henson Recording Studios, where Sob Rock was recorded.

== Credits and personnel ==
- John Mayer – vocals, guitars, keyboards, producer, composer
- Don Was – producer
- Maren Morris – background vocals
- Lenny Castro – percussion
- Greg Phillinganes – keyboards
- Sean Hurley – bass
- Aaron Sterling – drums

== Charts ==
=== Weekly charts ===
Weekly chart performance for "Last Train Home"
Chart (2021–2024)	Peak position
Canada Hot 100 (Billboard)	88
Global 200 (Billboard)	103
Netherlands (Dutch Top 40)	14
Netherlands (Single Top 100)	20
New Zealand Hot Singles (RMNZ)	4
UK Singles (Official Charts)	91
US Bubbling Under Hot 100 (Billboard)	1
US Hot Rock & Alternative Songs (Billboard)	13
US Rock & Alternative Airplay (Billboard)	29

=== Year-end charts ===
Year-end chart performance for "Last Train Home"
Chart (2021)	Position
Netherlands (Dutch Top 40)	43
US Hot Rock & Alternative Songs (Billboard)	70

== Certifications ==
Certifications for "Last Train Home"
Region	Certification	Certified units/sales
Denmark (IFPI Danmark)	Gold	45,000^{‡}
^{‡} Sales+streaming figures based on certification alone.

== Soundtracks ==
"Last Train Home" plays over the closing credits of the "Ceres" episode of The Bear season 1. According to one analysis of the show's music, the narrator of the song is "totally committed to a potential romance. If the lady is happy to put her all into it too, he invites her to come on board: 'So if you're comin' with me, let me know / Maybe you're the last train / Maybe you're the last train home'."
