= Party In Your Bedroom =

- Demo version cover art

Single by Cash Cash

from the album Take It to the Floor
- Released: April 14, 2009
- Genre: Neon pop-punk
- Length: 3:19
- Label: Universal Republic
- Songwriters: Alexander Makhlouf; Jean Paul Makhlouf; Samuel Frisch
- Producers: Cash Cash; S*A*M and Sluggo

Cash Cash singles chronology
| "Party In Your Bedroom" (2009) | "Everytime We Touch" (2010) |

Music video
- "Party In Your Bedroom" on YouTube

"Party In Your Bedroom" is a song by American electronic music group Cash Cash. It was released on April 14, 2009, as the lead single from their debut studio album Take It to the Floor via Universal Republic Records.

== Background and composition ==
"Party In Your Bedroom" was written by brothers Alexander and Jean Paul Makhlouf and Samuel Frisch while production was also handled by the group and S*A*M and Sluggo. When the song started to get spun at the Angels & Kings club in New York City, the track garnered a lot of buzz and attracted the interest of several record labels. According to singer Jean Paul Makhlouf, the song started off as a "random joke." He stated, "We recorded it one night and sent it to all our friends. They thought it was awesome, so we started to send it to labels and people in the music business." The song peaked at number one on AOL Radio. The track was featured on Warped Tour's Free Sampler, released via iTunes.

== Versions ==
There are four versions of the song "Party In Your Bedroom". The first version was released on their Cash Cash EP in 2008. The song was re-recorded for their debut studio album, Take It to the Floor. The group also released the original demo of the song on November 16, 2010. The fourth version is an acoustic version of "Party In Your Bedroom" that was released digitally on November 19, 2010.

== Critical reception ==
Music critics have described "Party In Your Bedroom" as the highlight of Take It to the Floor. AllMusic's Tim Sendra stated, "As evidenced by the band's one perfect moment, 'Party in Your Bedroom', it's awesome." In a review of the album from AbsolutePunk.net, they called the track, "the most single potential," praising the song for its radio friendly sound. Maria Serra of Alternative Press described the track as a "sexually charged hit."

== Music video ==
The music video for "Party In Your Bedroom" was directed by Brendan Kyle Cochrane. According to Makhlouf, the premise of the music video is based on the 1998 film Can't Hardly Wait where each of the members played the characters from the film. The video became the most-requested music video on MTVu. The group also held an amateur video contest for the song.

The music video won the MTVu award for Best Freshmen Video.

== Track listing ==
CD single
| No. | Title | Length |
|---|---|---|
| 1. | "Party In Your Bedroom" | 3:19 |

Digital download
| No. | Title | Length |
|---|---|---|
| 1. | "Party In Your Bedroom" (Original Demo) | 3:20 |

== Charts ==
Chart performance for "Party In Your Bedroom"
| Chart (2009) | Peak position |
|---|---|
| Japan (Hot 100 Airplay) | 12 |

== Release history ==
| Region | Version | Date | Format | Label | Ref. |
|---|---|---|---|---|---|
| United States | Original | April 14, 2009 | Contemporary hit radio | Universal Republic | |
| Various | Demo | November 16, 2010 | Digital download | Digital Heart Beat Music | |
