= Too Late (Cash Cash song) =

2021 single by Cash Cash featuring Wiz Khalifa and Lukas Graham

Single by Cash Cash featuring Wiz Khalifa and Lukas Graham

from the album Say It Like You Feel It
- Released: February 12, 2021
- Genre: EDM; hip hop
- Length: 3:13
- Label: Big Beat
- Songwriters: Alex Makhlouf; Camron Thomaz; Dijon McFarlane; Henrik Wolsing; Jean Paul Makhlouf; Lukas Forchhammer; Samuel Frisch
- Producer: Cash Cash

Cash Cash singles chronology
"Love You Now" (2020)	"Too Late" (2021)	"Ride or Die" (2021)

Wiz Khalifa singles chronology
"Cheers" (2020)	"Too Late" (2021)	"Used to Be" (2021)

Lukas Graham singles chronology
"No Evil" (2021)	"Too Late" (2021)	"Happy for You" (2021)

Music video
- "Too Late" on YouTube

"Too Late" is a song by American EDM group Cash Cash featuring American rapper Wiz Khalifa and Danish pop band Lukas Graham. It was released on February 12, 2021, via Big Beat Records, included Cash Cash's fifth studio album Say It Like You Feel It.

== Background ==
In a remote interview with Flaunt, JP Makhlouf explain they track started with Forchhammer: "Lucas made the hook, sent us the hook and we built the track around the hook." Afterward they sent it to different people. Subsequently Khalifa recorded a part of the track, and was appreciated by Cash Cash, finally they completed it.

Forchhammer told to ABC Audio: "It's, like, so pandemic-y, very COVID-19-friendly collaboration, sending things back and forth, it was very fun but super-weird, like, writing a whole song without talking to each other...just sending emails back and forth!"

== Content ==
According to a press release, "Too Late" is "a sentimental, emotional anthem", and "a compelling single featuring undeniable."

== Critical reception ==
Natalie Wicks of EDM Unplugged commented the song "[is] a heartwarming single that is both captivating and catchy as the vocals soar with a persevering message to always "do what’s right" and "hold on.""

== Track listing ==
Digital download and streaming
No.	Title	Length
1.	"Too Late"	3:13

Digital download and streaming – remixes
No.	Title	Length
1.	"Too Late" (Riggi & Piros remix)	2:48
2.	"Too Late" (Cash Cash VIP remix)	3:32

== Credits and personnel ==
Credits adapted from AllMusic.

- Cash Cash – primary artist
- Lukas Graham – primary artist
- Wiz Khalifa – primary artist

== Charts ==
=== Weekly charts ===
Weekly chart performance of "Too Late"
Chart (2021)	Peak position
US Hot Dance/Electronic Songs (Billboard)	14

=== Year-end charts ===
Year-end chart performance for "Too Late"
Chart (2021)	Position
US Hot Dance/Electronic Songs (Billboard)	68
