= Finest Hour (Cash Cash song) =

Single by Cash Cash featuring Abir

from the album Say It Like You Feel It
- Released: April 12, 2018
- Genre: Dance-pop
- Length: 3:35
- Label: Big Beat
- Songwriters: Abir Haronni; Alex Makhlouf; Dave Dalton; Frank Hendler; Jean Paul Makhlouf; Nathanial L John; Samuel Frisch
- Producer: Cash Cash

Cash Cash singles chronology
"Jewel" (2018)	"Finest Hour" (2018)	"Call You" (2018)

Music video
- "Finest Hour" on YouTube

"Finest Hour" is a song by American EDM trio Cash Cash featuring Moroccan singer-songwriter Abir. It was released on April 12, 2018, by Big Beat. The song peaked at number 14 on the US Hot Dance/Electronic Songs chart and was certified Gold by the Recording Industry Association of America.

== Background ==
In an interview with Paper, Cash Cash mentioned: '"Finest Hour" is about when you lose control at some point, when things aren't working out as planned." Abir added: "'Finest Hour' is about reaching a breaking point and owning it. Everyone has days where nothing seems to go right but recognizing that it's just a moment and shit happens is what's most important."

== Composition ==
"Finest Hour" was written by Abir Haronni, Alex Makhlouf, Dave Dalton, Frank Hendler, Jean Paul Makhlouf, Nathanial L John and Samuel Frisch, while production was handled by Cash Cash. Speaking about how the song came together, Abir first started with a drum loop and piano chords. Then, her manager decided to take "a stab" at producing the song and "ended up making it sound like an actual record." Later, when she had her first session with Cash Cash, they added synths and harmonies to the track.

== Music video ==
The video was released on July 17, 2018. Beginning with a couple at the start of their relationship, and follows them throughout their finest hours of their courtship, highlighting milestones as their family grows.

== Other versions ==
On September 14, 2018, Abir released her solo acoustic version, after she signed to Atlantic Records. On September 21, a remixes EP was released, featuring remixes from Zookeper, Michael Calfan and MOTi.

== Track listing ==
Digital download
No.	Title	Length
1.	"Finest Hour" (feat. Abir)	3:35

Digital download – remixes
No.	Title	Length
1.	"Finest Hour" (Zookeper remix)	3:36
2.	"Finest Hour" (MOTi remix)	3:08
3.	"Finest Hour" (Madison Mars remix)	3:17
4.	"Finest Hour" (Michael Calfan remix)	3:07
5.	"Finest Hour" (Savi remix)	3:45
6.	"Finest Hour" (Denis First & Reznikov remix)	2:58

== Charts ==
=== Weekly charts ===
Weekly chart performance for "Finest Hour"
Chart (2018)	Peak position
Belgium (Ultratip Bubbling Under Flanders)	4
US Hot Dance/Electronic Songs (Billboard)	14

=== Year-end charts ===
Year-end chart performance for "Finest Hour"
Chart (2018)	Position
US Hot Dance/Electronic Songs (Billboard)	35

== Certifications ==
Certifications for "Finest Hour"
Region	Certification	Certified units/sales
United States (RIAA)	Gold	500,000^{‡}
^{‡} Sales+streaming figures based on certification alone.
