= Used to Be (Steve Aoki and Kiiara song) =

2021 song by Steve Aoki and Kiiara

Single by Steve Aoki and Kiiara featuring Wiz Khalifa
- Released: March 19, 2021
- Genre: Pop; EDM
- Length: 3:40
- Label: Big Beat
- Songwriters: Alexander Pall; Andrew Taggart; Cameron Jibril Thomaz; Joseph Henderson; Madi Yanofsky; Michael McEachern; Michael V. Gazzo; Rob Thomas; Steve Aoki
- Producers: Michael McEachern; Steve Aoki

Steve Aoki singles chronology
"Give Me the Night" (2021)	"Used to Be" (2021)	"Aire" (2021)

Kiiara singles chronology
"Happy Hour" (2021)	"Used to Be" (2021)	"Never Felt Like This" (2021)

Wiz Khalifa singles chronology
"Too Late" (2021)	"Used to Be" (2021)	"Million Dollar Moment" (2021)

Music video
- "Used to Be" on YouTube

"Used to Be" is a song by American DJ and producer Steve Aoki and American singer-songwriter Kiiara, featuring American rapper Wiz Khalifa. The song was released on March 19, 2021, via Big Beat.

== Composition ==
"Used to Be" contains a sample from Matchbox Twenty's single "Unwell" (2003), from which the title is derived.

== Music video ==
The music video was directed by Noah Sterling and animated by Dreambear. Aoki, Kiiara and Khalifa fighting with an evil villain to save their "galactic city".

== Acoustic version ==
On April 6, 2021, an acoustic version of the song with Aoki, Kiiara, and Rob Thomas from Matchbox Twenty instead of Khalifa was released.

== Credits and personnel ==
Credits adapted from Tidal.

- Michael McEachern – producer, writer
- Steve Aoki – producer, programmer, writer
- Wiz Khalifa – featured artist, programmer, writer
- Colin Leonard – Masterer
- Miles Walker – Mixer
- Bolooki – vocal producer
- Kiiara – vocal
- Alexander Pall – writer
- Andrew Taggart – writer
- Joseph Henderson – writer
- Madison Yanofsky – writer
- Michael V. Gazzo – writer
- Rob Thomas – writer

== Charts ==
=== Weekly charts ===
Weekly chart performance for "Used to Be"
Chart (2021)	Peak position
New Zealand Hot Singles (RMNZ)	18
US Hot Dance/Electronic Songs (Billboard)	10

=== Year-end charts ===
Year-end chart performance for "Used to Be"
Chart (2021)	Position
US Hot Dance/Electronic Songs (Billboard)	28

== Release history ==
Release history for "Used to Be"
Region	Date	Format	Label	Ref.
Various	March 19, 2021	Digital download; streaming	Big Beat	
