= Zookeper =

Musician and producer (b. 1989)

Zookëper
- Born: Michael Doerr; January 14, 1989 (age 36); New Jersey, United States
- Occupations: DJ; record producer; musician
- Years active: 2008–present
- Musical career
- Genres: EDM
- Instruments: Guitar; backing vocals
- Labels: Big Beat; Spinnin'; Epic; Musical Freedom; Hysteria; Enhanced

Michael Doerr (born January 14, 1989), known professionally as Zookeper (stylized as Zookëper) is an American electronic music artist and producer from New Jersey.

Doerr went under the alias in 2013. He released his own original songs in 2015, including "Gunz" and "Move off Ya Feet". On tour, he was a supporting act for Tritonal, Bingo Players, and others.

He is best known for his singles, "Watch Me" and "Parallel Lines" that reached the top ten on the dance charts. He garnered over 40 million streams on Spotify and has also done remixes for the likes of John Mayer, Cher, Jason Derulo, The Knocks, and Teyana Taylor among others.

== Career ==
Doerr initially started his career as a touring guitarist for Cash Cash in 2008. He was credited on their 2008 debut album, Take It to the Floor, as the photo editor. He left the group in August 2009. In 2011, Doerr did a remix to the song "Dirty People" by Alsex.

In 2013, Doerr began going under the name, Zookëper, remixing songs for other artists such as the Ready Set and Goldhouse. He started to release original songs of his own in 2015. He released his debut single "Move off Ya Feet", in December.

In 2018, he made a remix to John Mayer's song, "New Light" which has gone on to become double platinum in the United States. He also released a single that year titled, "For Real", which peaked on the Belgium Ultratip chart as an "extra tip" position. His single "Do You Think About Me" reached number four on the UK Commercial Pop Top 30 chart. His breakout hit "Watch Me" entered the Billboard Dance/Mix Show Airplay chart at number 27, and later peaked at number 15 on the week of July 20, 2019. The song also peaked at number six on the Mediabase Dance Radio Airplay Top 100 Chart. His follow up single "Parallel Lines" was released in August 2019 and performed better than "Watch Me" on the Dance/Mix Show Airplay chart peaking at number eight. The song was inspired by Howard Stern according to Doerr.

In 2021, Zookëper went on a US tour with Bingo Players called the "Bingo Beach Tour". He performed at the Lollapalooza festival in 2022.

== Musical style ==
Speaking about what motivates him into making music, Doerr stated in an interview that he's, "not the type of producer who loves being locked in a room by himself all the time." He expresses that he loves being out, socializing, traveling, and "soaking in the energy of a packed room with music."

== Production equipment and software ==
In the studio, Doerr uses Genelec monitors, KRK sub, a laptop, a MIDI keyboard, and a 909 machine. He also uses a Arturia Analog Lab plug-in suite and the Roland Cloud. Doerr states he tries to use "classic sounds as much as possible and to keep the arrangements bare."

== Discography ==
=== Singles ===
List of singles, with selected chart positions
Title	Year	Peak chart positions			Album
Title	Year	US Dance Airplay	BEL (Fl)	UK Pop	Album
"Move off Ya Feet"	2015	—	—	—	Non-album singles
"Gunz"	2016	—	—	—	Non-album singles
"Waistline" (featuring Keno)	2016	—	—	—	Non-album singles
"Bang Boogie"	2016	—	—	—	Non-album singles
"For Real"	2018	—	— (Note: "For Real" did not enter the Ultratop 50, but charted as an "extra tip" on the Ultratip chart.)	—	Non-album singles
"Void" (featuring Emmalyn)	2018	—	—	—	Non-album singles
"Do You Think About Me" (featuring Georgia Ku)	2018	—	—	4	Non-album singles
"Body Heat" (featuring Maribelle)	2018	—	—	—	Non-album singles
"From Me"	2018	—	—	—	Non-album singles
"On N On" (featuring Iceman)	2018	—	—	—	Non-album singles
"Watch Me"	2019	15	—	—	Non-album singles
"Parallel Lines"	2019	8	—	—	Non-album singles
"House Phone"	2019	—	—	—	Non-album singles
"Rain Drops" (featuring Carla Monroe)	2020	—	—	—	Non-album singles
"Good Time"	2020	—	—	—	Non-album singles
"Body Talk"	2020	—	—	—	Non-album singles
"Think of You" (featuring Marlhy)	2021	—	—	—	Non-album singles
"Do What You Like"	2021	—	—	—	Non-album singles
"Be Just Fine" (featuring Leonelle)	2021	—	—	—	Non-album singles
"Taking Over Me"	2022	—	—	—	Non-album singles
"Obsession"	2022	—	—	—	Non-album singles
"Bathroom Line"	2022	—	—	—	Non-album singles
"Verano"	2022	—	—	—	Non-album singles
"Numb" (featuring Sodium)	2022	—	—	—	Non-album singles
"I Wanna"	2023	—	—	—	Non-album singles
"Close My Eyes"	2023	—	—	—	Non-album singles
"—" denotes releases that did not chart

=== Remixes ===
Year	Title
2011	Alsex - "Dirty People" (Remix)
2013	The Ready Set - "Give Me Your Hand (Best Song Ever)" (Remix)
2013	Smallpools - "Dreaming" (Remix)
2014	Goldhouse - "FeelGood" (Remix)
2016	Bingo Players - "Out of My Mind" (Remix)
2017	HARIZ - "OVRBRD" (Remix)
2017	The Knocks - "House Party" (Remix)
2018	Echosmith - "Over My Head" (Remix)
2018	Cash Cash - "Finest Hour" (Remix)
2018	John Mayer - "New Light"
2018	Matoma - "Sunday Morning" (Remix)
2019	Breathe Carolina - "My Love" (Remix)
2019	Goldhouse - "Cardio" (Remix)
2019	Teyana Taylor - "WTP" (Remix)
2020	070 Shake - "Guilty Conscience" (Remix)
2020	Meghan Trainor - "Nice to Meet Ya" (Remix)
2021	Steve James and Morgan Page - "Like I Do" (Remix)
2021	Sigrid - "Mirror" (Remix)
2022	Meghan Trainor - "Bad for Me" (Remix)

=== Other appearances ===
Year	Artist	Song/Album	Notes
2008	Cash Cash	Take It to the Floor	Photo editor
2018	Sj	Calabasas	Producer
2019	Captain Cuts	"Heat"	Songwriter, producer
2021	Cash Cash	Say It Like You Feel It	Drum programming, keyboards, producer, programmer, composer
