= RBD discography =

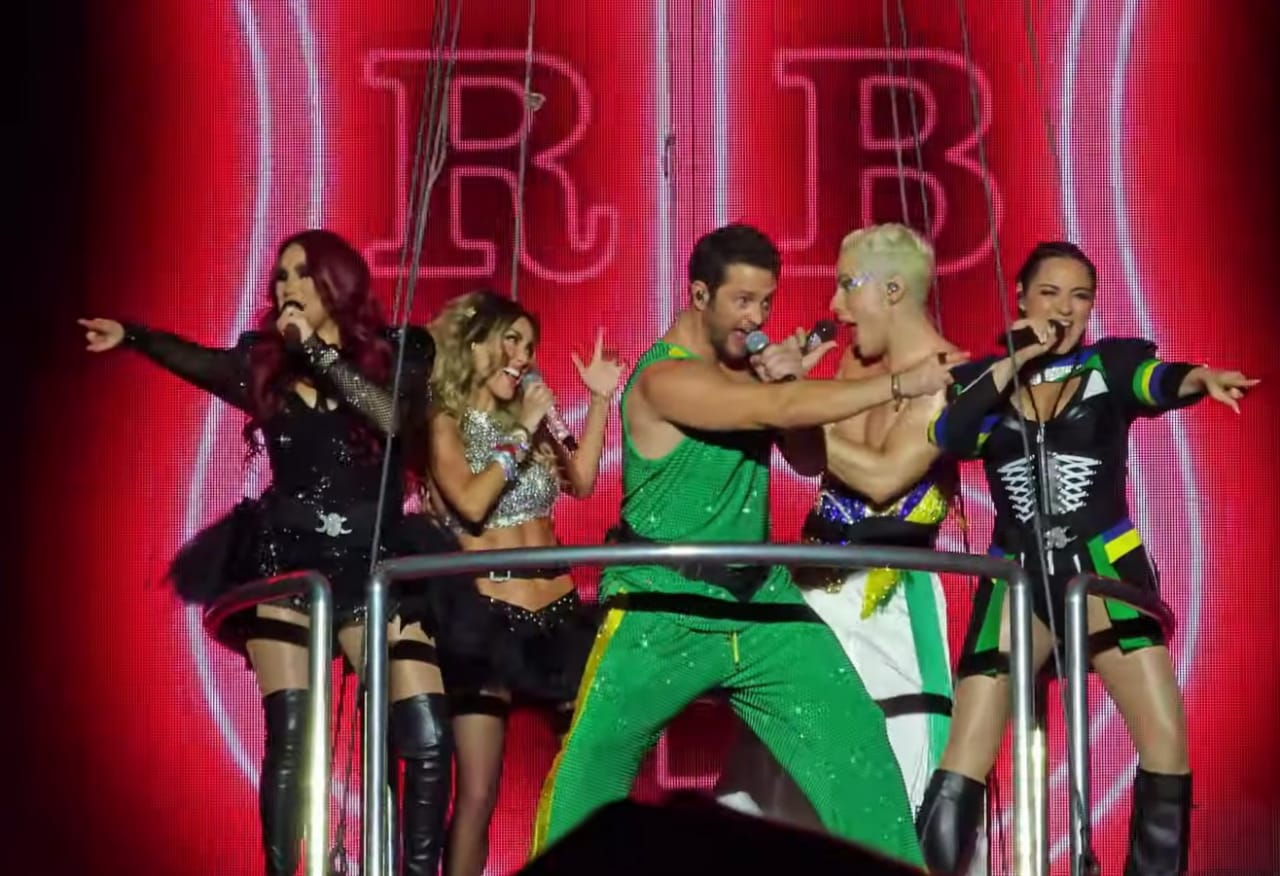
- RBD in 2023, during the Soy Rebelde Tour.
- Studio albums: 6
- Extended plays: 13
- Live albums: 7
- Compilation albums: 5
- Singles: 21
- Promotional singles: 11
- Box sets: 2
- Reissues: 3

Mexican Latin pop group RBD has released six studio albums, six live albums, five compilation albums, 13 extended plays (EPs), 21 singles, 11 promotional singles, two box sets, and three reissues. According to Billboard, they have sold over 14.9 million albums worldwide as of October 2008, making them one of the best-selling Latin music artists of all time. Luminate revealed that, in terms of pure sales, they have tallied 2 million albums in the United States. RBD made their chart debut in September 2004 with "Rebelde", which was followed by the release of their debut studio album, also titled Rebelde (2004). The record reached number one in Mexico and Spain, being later certified Diamond by the Asociación Mexicana de Productores de Fonogramas y Videogramas (AMPROFON). By the end of 2006, it had sold over 1.5 million copies according to EMI. The album also spawned the top-ten hits "Solo Quédate En Silencio" and "Sálvame", which achieved significant success in several Latin American countries. During their subsequent Tour Generación RBD (2005–2007), the group released the live album Tour Generación RBD En Vivo (2005). In 2006, it received certified Platinum from the Recording Industry Association of America (RIAA) in the Latin field, indicating sales of 60,000 album-equivalent units.

RBD's second studio album, Nuestro Amor, was released on September 22, 2005, sold 127,000 units within seven hours of its release and certified triple Platinum in Mexico. Additionally, the album peaked at number 88 on the US Billboard 200, and topped the Top Latin and Latin Pop Albums charts. It spawned four singles—"Nuestro Amor", "Aún Hay Algo", "Tras de Mí", and "Este Corazón". Fueled by the success of the lead single "Ser o Parecer", the group's third album Celestial (2006), debuted at number 15 on the Billboard 200, with first-week sales of 117,000 copies. According to Luminate, the album has sold over 498,000 copies (as of October 2008) in the US, becoming RBD's best-selling album in the country. It also charted inside the top ten in Mexico, Spain, and Brazil. In 2009, Billboard named Celestial as the fifth best-selling Latin pop album of the 2000s. EMI's Brazilian subsidiary has reissued the group's first three albums in Brazil, featuring the songs re-recorded in Portuguese. The first two reissues, Rebelde (Edição Brasil) and Nosso Amor Rebelde, appeared in the top 20 best-selling albums in Brazil between 2005 and 2006, respectively. In December 2006, the sextet released their fourth album, Rebels, which was their first project in English. However, it did not replicate its success in the United States as Celestial, where it peaked at number 40 on the Billboard 200. Its single "Tu Amor" was a moderate success, reaching the top ten in Mexico and Colombia, and number 65 on the US Billboard Hot 100.

The group's fifth release, Empezar Desde Cero (2007), was the ninth best-selling Latin pop record in the US for 2008. The album received record certifications in several countries, including Gold certifications in Argentina and Spain, and a triple-Platinum certification in RBD's native Mexico. Its lead single "Inalcanzable", peaked at number four on the Monitor Latino chart and number 44 in the Romanian Top 100. Following RBD's disbandment announcement, three greatest hits albums were released in 2008—Best of, Hits Em Português, and Greatest Hits. The sextet's final album, Para Olvidarte De Mí (2009), was not promoted and did not achieve the same success as their earlier releases. However, the title track reached number 26 on the Billboard Mexico Airplay chart. In 2020, RBD reunited for the first time and released the single "Siempre He Estado Aquí", being later certified Platinum by Pro-Música Brasil (PMB). That same year, they also released the RBD: Edición Limitada and Siempre Rebelde box sets. Following this, they put out the live album Ser O Parecer: The Global Virtual Union (En Vivo) in 2021, and the single "Cerquita de Ti" to promote the Soy Rebelde Tour (2023).

== Albums ==
=== Studio albums ===
List of studio albums, with selected chart positions, sales figures, and certifications
Title	Album details	Peak chart positions							Sales (Note: Pure sales and not equivalent units (streaming and song downloads).)	Certifications
Title	Album details	MEX	ARG	BRA	HRV	SPA	US	US Latin	Sales	Certifications
Rebelde	Released: November 30, 2004; Label: EMI Latin; Formats: CD, LP, digital download, streaming	1	—	13	40	1	95	2	MEX: 500,000 (Note: Mexican sales for Rebelde as of December 2007.); US: 416,000 (Note: US sales for Rebelde as of October 2006.); BRA: 250,000 (Note: Brazilian sales for Rebelde as of March 2006.); WW: 1,500,000 (Note: Worldwide sales for Rebelde as of January 2007.)	AMPROFON: Diamond; RIAA: 4× Platinum (Latin); PROMUSICAE: 2× Platinum
Nuestro Amor	Released: September 22, 2005; Label: EMI Latin; Formats: CD, LP, digital download, streaming	1	—	3	—	3	88	1	BRA: 271,000 (Note: Brazilian sales for Nuestro Amor as of September 2007.); COL: 10,000 (Note: Colombian sales for Nuestro Amor as of February 2006.); ROU: 10,000 (Note: Romanian sales for Nuestro Amor as of May 2007.); WW: 1,100,000 (Note: Worldwide sales for Nuestro Amor as of December 2006.)	AMPROFON: 3× Platinum; RIAA: 2× Platinum (Latin); PROMUSICAE: Platinum
Celestial	Released: November 21, 2006; Label: EMI Latin; Formats: CD, LP, digital download, streaming	2	—	8	37	2	15	1	MEX: 150,000 (Note: Mexican sales for Celestial as of July 2007.); US: 498,000 (Note: US sales for Celestial, Rebels and Empezar Desde Cero as of October 2008.)	AMPROFON: Platinum; PROMUSICAE: Gold
Rebels	Released: December 19, 2006; Label: EMI Latin, Virgin; Formats: CD, LP, digital download, streaming	2	—	—	—	1	40	—	US: 225,000	AMPROFON: Gold
Empezar Desde Cero	Released: November 20, 2007; Label: EMI Latin; Formats: CD, LP, digital download, streaming	4	17	—	30	4	60	1	US: 102,000	AMPROFON: 4× Platinum; CAPIF: Gold; PROMUSICAE: Gold
Para Olvidarte de Mí	Released: March 10, 2009; Label: EMI Latin; Formats: CD, LP, digital download, streaming	3	10	—	—	17	192	6		
"—" denotes items which were not released in that country or failed to chart.

=== Reissues ===
List of reissues, with selected chart positions, sales figures, and notes
Title	Album details	Peak chart positions	Sales	Notes
Title	Album details	BRA	Sales	Notes
Rebelde (Edição Brasil)	Released: November 1, 2005; Label: EMI Brazil; Formats: CD, digital download, streaming	12	BRA: 250,000 (Note: Brazilian sales for Rebelde (Edição Brasil) as of March 2006.)	Released exclusively in Brazil, includes seven tracks from the Rebelde album that were re-recorded in Portuguese. However, the tracks "Otro Día Que Va", "Futuro Ex-Novio", "Santa No Soy", and "Fuego" were not re-recorded.
Nosso Amor Rebelde	Released: May 22, 2006; Label: EMI Brazil; Formats: CD, digital download, streaming	14		Released exclusively in Brazil, includes eleven tracks from the Nuestro Amor album that were re-recorded in Portuguese. However, the tracks "Me Voy" and "Así Soy Yo" were not re-recorded.
Celestial (Versão Brasil)	Released: December 4, 2006; Label: EMI Brazil; Formats: CD, digital download, streaming	—		Released exclusively in Brazil, includes eight tracks from the Celestial album that were re-recorded in Portuguese. However, the tracks "Es Por Amor", "Aburrida Y Sola", and "Algún Día" were not re-recorded.
"—" denotes items which were not released in that country or failed to chart.

=== Live albums ===
List of live albums, with selected chart positions, sales figures, and certifications
Title	Album details	Peak chart positions						Sales	Certifications
Title	Album details	MEX	BRA	SPA	US	US Latin	US Latin Pop	Sales	Certifications
Tour Generación RBD En Vivo	Released: July 19, 2005; Label: EMI Latin; Formats: CD+DVD, 2CD, digital download	1	—	13	—	22	16		AMPROFON: Platinum; RIAA: Platinum (Latin)
Live in Hollywood	Released: April 4, 2006; Label: EMI Latin; Formats: CD+DVD, digital download	3	15	34	120	6	4	ECU: 1,430 (Note: Ecuadorian sales for Live in Hollywood as of January 2007.)	AMPROFON: Gold; RIAA: 2× Platinum (Latin)
Hecho en España	Released: October 1, 2007; Label: EMI Latin; Formats: CD+DVD, 2CD, digital download	21	—	47	—	—	—		
Live in Brasília (Note: It was initially released only on DVD.)	Released: October 2, 2020; Label: Universal; Formats: CD+DVD, 2CD, digital download, streaming	—	—	—	—	—	—		
Ser O Parecer: The Global Virtual Union (En Vivo)	Released: June 10, 2021; Label: Universal; Formats: Digital download, streaming	—	—	—	—	—	—		
Live in Rio	Released: July 21, 2023; Label: Universal; Formats: Digital download, streaming	—	—	—	—	—	—		
Por Siempre	Released: May 13, 2025; Label: Universal; Formats: Digital download, streaming	—	—	—	—	—	—		
"—" denotes items which were not released in that country or failed to chart.

=== Compilation albums ===
List of compilation albums, with selected chart positions, and notes
Title	Album details	Peak chart positions						Notes
Title	Album details	MEX	HRV	ECU	SPA	US Latin	US Latin Pop	Notes
RBD: La Familia	Released: March 14, 2007; Label: EMI Latin; Formats: CD	—	—	—	—	—	—	Released to promote RBD: La Familia, is a compilation of songs from RBD's previous albums, including a new track, "Quiero Poder".
Best of	Released: September 23, 2008; Label: EMI Latin; Formats: CD+DVD, digital download	24	33	6	49	—	—	15-track greatest hits released in September 2008, following the group's disbandment. It was accompanied by a DVD that featured all of RBD's music videos.
Hits Em Português	Released: October 22, 2008; Label: EMI Brazil; Formats: CD, digital download	—	—	—	—	—	—	Brazil exclusive 15-track greatest hits in Portuguese, released in October 2008.
Greatest Hits	Released: November 25, 2008; Label: EMI Latin; Formats: CD+DVD, digital download	—	—	—	—	37	9	A 12-track greatest hits album exclusive to the American market released in November 2008. It serves as the American counterpart to Best Of.
Best of Remixes	Released: December 15, 2009; Label: EMI Brazil; Formats: CD, digital download	—	—	—	—	—	—	A remix album exclusively for Brazil, released by EMI in December 2009.
"—" denotes items which were not released in that country or failed to chart.

=== Box set ===
List of box sets with notes
Title	Description	Notes
RBD: Edición Limitada	Released: September 25, 2020; Label: Universal; Formats: CD	Mexican 6-disc box set containing Rebelde, Nuestro Amor, Celestial, Rebels, Empezar Desde Cero, and Para Olvidarte de Mí.
Siempre Rebelde	Released: November 27, 2020; Label: Universal Brasil; Formats: CD	A Brazil-exclusive box set consisting of 9 CDs—Rebelde, Nuestro Amor, Rebelde: Edição Português, Nosso Amor Rebelde, Celestial, Celestial: Versão Brasil, Rebels, Empezar Desde Cero, and Para Olvidarte de Mí.

== Extended plays ==
List of extended plays with notes
Title	EP details	Notes
Original Y No Custa Caro Original	Released: 2004; Label: EMI Latin; Formats: CD	Mexican EP, includes the tracks "Rebelde", "Enséñame", "Solo Quédate En Silencio" and "Futuro Ex-Novio".
RBD + Exa FM	Released: 2005 (Exa FM exclusive); Label: EMI Latin; Formats: CD	Mexican promotional EP, includes the tracks "Rebelde", "Un Poco de Tu Amor" and "Solo Quédate En Silencio" (with bonus track).
En Blockbuster Canta Como RBD	Released: 2005 (Blockbuster exclusive); Label: EMI Latin; Formats: CD	Mexican-only EP released in 2005 by Blockbuster. Includes all four singles from Rebelde.
Live in Hollywood (Edición Especial Exa FM)	Released: April 5, 2006 (Exa FM exclusive); Label: EMI Latin; Formats: CD	Mexican-only 6-track EP released to coincide with the live album Live in Hollywood.
Lexmark + RBD	Released: 2006 (Lexmark exclusive); Label: EMI Latin; Formats: CD	A four-track EP originally released only in Mexico, it includes "Nuestro Amor", "Este Corazón", "Fuera" and "Aburrida y Sola".
Stereo 97.7 FM + RBD	Released: 2006 (Stereo 97.7 FM exclusive); Label: EMI Latin; Formats: CD	Mexican-only 4-track EP released to coincide with the studio album Celestial. Features "Ser O Parecer", "Aún Hay Algo", "Nuestro Amor" and "Tras de Mí".
Live Tour Celestial 2007	Released: 2007; Label: EMI Latin; Formats: CD	Mexican promotional EP to promote Tour Celestial. Includes songs by RBD and Diego Boneta, the tour's opening act.
Grandes Éxitos de RBD en Karaoke para tu PC	Released: 2007; Label: EMI Latin; Formats: CD	Chilean-only 8-track EP released in 2007. Includes RBD's greatest hits in karaoke.
Plug & Play	Released: March 20, 2008 (iTunes exclusive); Label: EMI Latin; Formats: Digital download	A iTunes-exclusive EP consisting of a live acoustic version of "Rebelde", "Ser O Parecer", "Aún Hay Algo", "Bésame Sin Miedo", "Celestial" and "Tras de Mí" from Plug n' Play.
5 Éxitos por un Tostón	Released: November 24, 2009; Label: EMI Latin; Formats: CD	Limited 5-track EP released in Mexico. Includes the tracks: "Sólo Quédate en Silencio", "Rebelde", "Empezar Desde Cero" and "Sálvame".
RBD Medley Eras	Released: November 10, 2023; Label: Universal; Formats: Digital download, streaming	EPs consisting of select songs from RBD's past albums.
RBD Girls	Released: November 16, 2023; Label: Universal; Formats: Digital download, streaming	EPs consisting of select songs from RBD's past albums.
RBD Boys	Released: November 23, 2023; Label: Universal; Formats: Digital download, streaming	EPs consisting of select songs from RBD's past albums.

== Singles ==
=== As lead artist ===
List of singles as lead artist, with selected chart positions, certifications, and associated albums
Title	Year	Peak chart positions										Certifications	Album
Title	Year	MEX	BRA	CHL	COL	GMT	ROU	SLV	US	US Latin	VEN	Certifications	Album
"Rebelde"	2004	1	63	1	—	1	—	1	—	37	35	PMB: Gold	Rebelde
"Sólo Quédate En Silencio"	2004	2	—	2	—	—	—	1	—	2	—		Rebelde
"Sálvame"	2005	5	97	6	5	1	—	7	—	— (Note: "Sálvame" did not enter the Hot Latin Songs, but peaked at 27 on the Latin Pop Airplay chart.)	—	PMB: Gold	Rebelde
"Un Poco De Tu Amor"	2005	—	—	—	—	2	—	—	—	—	—		Rebelde
"Nuestro Amor"	2005	1	—	—	—	1	33	—	—	6	—		Nuestro Amor
"Aún Hay Algo"	2005	— (Note: "Aún Hay Algo" did not enter the Top 20 General, but peaked at 10 on the Spanish AC/POP chart.)	5	—	—	5	—	—	—	24	—		Nuestro Amor
"Tras de Mí"	2006	—	—	—	—	8	—	—	—	—	— (Note: "Tras de Mí" did not enter the Record Report Top 100, but peaked at 14 on the Record Report Top Latino chart.)		Nuestro Amor
"Este Corazón"	2006	—	—	—	—	1	—	4	—	10	—		Nuestro Amor
"Ser o Parecer"	2006	4	62	—	5	5	10	1	84	1	—		Celestial
"Tu Amor"	2006	2	63	—	2	—	—	—	65	—	—		Rebels
"Wanna Play" (Note: Released only in US.)	2006	—	—	—	—	—	—	—	—	—	—		Rebels
"Money Money" (Note: Released only in Spain.)	2006	—	—	—	—	—	—	—	—	—	—		Rebels
"Celestial"	2007	—	—	8	—	—	—	—	—	— (Note: "Celestial" did not enter the Hot Latin Songs, but peaked at 40 on the Latin Pop Airplay chart.)	—		Celestial
"Bésame Sin Miedo"	2007	—	—	—	—	—	36	—	—	30	—		Celestial
"Dame"	2007	—	—	—	—	—	—	—	—	38	—		Celestial
"Inalcanzable"	2007	4	—	—	4	—	44	3	—	6	29		Empezar Desde Cero
"Empezar Desde Cero"	2008	9	—	—	—	—	—	—	—	42	1		Empezar Desde Cero
"Y No Puedo Olvidarte"	2008	—	—	—	—	—	—	—	—	—	103		Empezar Desde Cero
"Para Olvidarte de Mí"	2009	26	—	—	—	—	—	—	—	—	—		Para Olvidarte de Mí
"Siempre He Estado Aquí"	2020	11	— (Note: "Siempre He Estado Aquí" did not enter the Top 100 Brasil, but peaked at 10 on the Top 10 Latino chart.)	—	—	—	—	—	—	—	—	PMB: Platinum	Non-album singles
"Cerquita de Ti"	2023	—	—	—	—	—	—	—	—	—	—	PMB: Gold	Non-album singles
"—" denotes a single that did not chart or was not released in that territory.

=== Promotional singles ===
List of promotional singles, with selected chart positions, notes, and associated albums
Title	Year	Peak chart positions	Notes	Album
Title	Year	BRA	Notes	Album
"Liso, Sensual"	2004	—	The song was released in 2004 on a compact disc as a promotional single in Mexico.; The song was later featured on RBD's second album, Nuestro Amor.	Non-album promotional single
"Rebelde"	2005	—	The song was released in 2005 on a compact disc as a promotional single in Brazil.	Rebelde (Edição Brasil)
"Fique em Silêncio"	2005	25	The song was released in 2005 on a compact disc as a promotional single in Brazil.	Rebelde (Edição Brasil)
"Salva-me"	2006	69	The song was released in 2006 on Brazilian radio stations as a promotional single.	Rebelde (Edição Brasil)
"No Pares"	2006	—	The song was released in 2006 on a compact disc as a promotional single in Mexico to promote Live in Hollywood.	Live in Hollywood
"México, México"	2006	—	The song was released as the official theme for the Mexico national football team during the 2006 World Cup.	México, México
"Nosso Amor"	2006	21	The song was released in 2006 on a compact disc as a promotional single in Brazil.	Nosso Amor Rebelde
"Venha de Novo O Amor"	2006	—	The song was released in 2006 on Brazilian radio stations as a promotional single.	Nosso Amor Rebelde
"Ser Ou Parecer"	2007	—	The song was released in 2007 on a compact disc as a promotional single in Brazil.	Celestial (Versão Brasil)
"Estar Bien" (with Kudai and Eiza González)	2008	—	The song was released in support of Mexico's Estar Bien anti-obesity campaign.	Empezar Desde Cero (Fan Edition)
"S.H.E.A"	2023	—	The song is an alternate version of "Siempre He Estado Aquí" featuring additional vocals by Dulce María.; PMB: Certified Gold	Non-album promotional single
"—" denotes a song that did not chart or was not released in that territory.

== Other charted songs ==
List of songs, with selected chart positions, showing year released and album name
Title	Year	Peak chart positions				Album
Title	Year	BRA	GMT	HND	SLV	Album
"Otro Día Que Va"	2004	—	—	6	—	Rebelde
"Enséñame"	2004	—	4	—	—	Rebelde
"Me Voy"	2005	—	—	2	—	Nuestro Amor
"Atrás de Mim"	2006	63	—	—	—	Nosso Amor Rebelde
"Lento" (Luny Tunes and Tainy with RBD)	2006	—	—	—	9	Mas Flow: Los Benjamins
"—" denotes a song that did not chart or was not released in that territory.

== Guest appearances ==
List of non-single guest appearances, showing year released, and album name
Title	Year	Album	Ref.
"Campana Sobre Campana"	2006	Navidad Con Amigos	
"Los Peces en El Río"	2007	Navidad Con Amigos	
"Sinceridad"	2008	La Música De Los Valores	

== See also ==
- Songs recorded by RBD
- List of best-selling albums in Mexico
