= List of awards and nominations received by RBD =

RBD awards and nominations
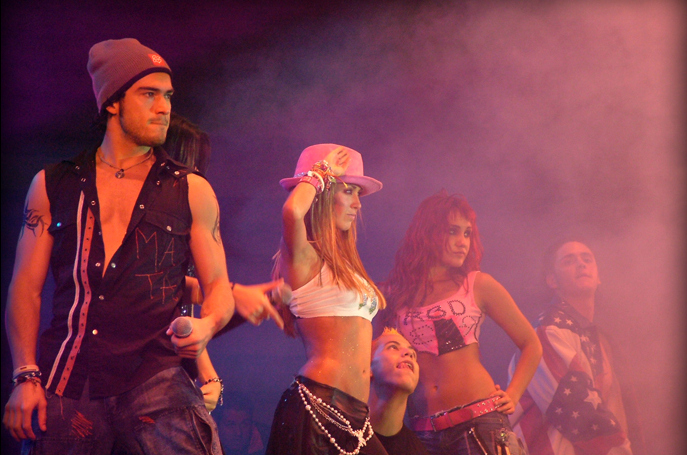
Awards and nominations
Award	Wins	Nominations
Billboard Latin Music Awards	7	17
Latin Grammy	0	2
Orgullosamente Latino	5	10
Premios Juventud	21	41
Premios Lo Nuestro	3	8

Totals (Note: Certain award groups do not simply award one winner. They acknowledge several different recipients, have runners-up, and have third place. Since this is a specific recognition and is different from losing an award, runner-up mentions are considered wins in this award tally. For simplification and to avoid errors, each award in this list has been presumed to have had a prior nomination.)
- Wins: 51
- Nominations: 107

RBD was a Mexican Latin pop group that gained popularity from Televisa's telenovela Rebelde. In 2004, they released their first studio album, Rebelde, which received five nominations for the Billboard Latin Music Awards and won two. The album was also nominated for Premios Juventud in four categories, winning in three and for Premios Oye! into two categories, winning both. They received the award for best musical theme for "Rebelde" at the TVyNovelas Awards.

The album Nuestro Amor (2005) received a nomination for the Latin Grammy Award, Billboard Latin Music Awards and the Lo Nuestro Awards, winning in the latter. In addition to four nominations for the Premios Juventud, winning in three. The Celestial album (2006) received the Billboard Latin Music Awards from Latin Pop Album, Duo or Group.

The song "No Pares" won the Orgullosamente Latino Award for Latin Song of the Year, defeating "Ser o Parecer" also of the group. The group received its second Latin Grammy nomination for the album Empezar Desde Cero (2007), losing again.

== Awards and nominations ==
List of awards and nominations received by RBD
Award	Year (Note: Indicates the year of ceremony. Each year is linked to the article about the awards held that year, wherever possible.)	Recipient(s) and nominee(s)	Category	Result	Ref.
ASCAP Awards	2006	"Solo Quédate En Silencio"	ASCAP Latin Award - Pop/Ballad Winning Song	Won	
ASCAP Awards	2008	"Ser o Parecer"	ASCAP Latin Award - Pop/Ballad Winning Song	Won	
ASCAP Awards	2009	"Inalcanzable"	ASCAP Latin Award - Pop/Ballad Winning Song	Won	
Billboard Music Awards	2023	Soy Rebelde Tour	Top Latin Touring Artist	Nominated	
Billboard Latin Music Awards	2006	Rebelde	Latin Pop Album, Duo or Group	Won	
Billboard Latin Music Awards	2006	Tour Generación RBD En Vivo	Latin Pop Album, Duo or Group	Nominated	
Billboard Latin Music Awards	2006	Nuestro Amor	Latin Pop Album, Duo or Group	Nominated	
Billboard Latin Music Awards	2006	Rebelde	Latin Pop Album, New Artist	Won	
Billboard Latin Music Awards	2006	Nuestro Amor	Latin Pop Album, New Artist	Nominated	
Billboard Latin Music Awards	2006	RBD	Top Latin Album Artist of the Year	Nominated	
Billboard Latin Music Awards	2006	"Solo Quédate En Silencio"	Latin Pop Airplay Song of the Year, Duo or Group	Nominated	
Billboard Latin Music Awards	2006	"Solo Quédate En Silencio"	Latin Pop Airplay Song of the Year, New Artist	Nominated	
Billboard Latin Music Awards	2006	"Solo Quédate En Silencio"	Latin Ringtone of the Year	Nominated	
Billboard Latin Music Awards	2007	Live in Hollywood	Latin Pop Album, Duo or Group	Nominated	
Billboard Latin Music Awards	2007	Celestial	Latin Pop Album, Duo or Group	Won	
Billboard Latin Music Awards	2007	RBD	Top Latin Album Artist of the Year	Won	
Billboard Latin Music Awards	2007	Tour Generación RBD	Latin Tour of the Year	Won	
Billboard Latin Music Awards	2008	Empezar Desde Cero	Latin Pop Album, Duo or Group	Nominated	
Billboard Latin Music Awards	2008	Celestial World Tour	Latin Tour of the Year	Nominated	
Billboard Latin Music Awards	2008	RBD	Your World Award (Premio Tu Mundo)	Won	
Billboard Latin Music Awards	2009	Gira del Adiós World Tour	Latin Tour of the Year	Won	
Brazil Music Awards	2006	RBD	Best Duo or Group	Won	
Capricho Awards	2007	RBD	Melhor Banda Internacional (Best International Band)	Nominated	
Capricho Awards	2008	RBD	Melhor Banda Internacional (Best International Band)	Nominated	
Capricho Awards	2008	Empezar Desde Cero World Tour	Melhor Show (Best Concert)	Nominated	
Capricho Awards	2008	"Inalcanzable"	Música Internacional (Best International Music)	Nominated	
Capricho Awards	2008	"Bésame Sin Miedo"	Melhor Vídeo do YouTube (Best YouTube Video)	Won	
Latin American Music Awards	2021	Ser O Parecer 2020	Favorite Virtual Concert	Won	
Latin Grammy Award	2006	Nuestro Amor	Best Pop Album by a Duo/Group with Vocals	Nominated	
Latin Grammy Award	2008	Empezar Desde Cero	Best Pop Album by a Duo/Group with Vocals	Nominated	
Les Etolies Cherie FM	2007	"Tu Amor"	Chanson Internationale De L'Anee (Int. Song of the Year)	Won	
Lo Nuestro Awards	2006	RBD	Latin Pop New Artist of the Year	Won	
Lo Nuestro Awards	2007	Nuestro Amor	Latin Pop Album of the Year - Duo or Group	Won	
Lo Nuestro Awards	2007	RBD	Duo or Group of the Year	Won	
Lo Nuestro Awards	2008	Celestial	Latin Pop Album of the Year - Duo or Group	Nominated	
Lo Nuestro Awards	2008	RBD	Duo or Group of the Year	Nominated	
Lo Nuestro Awards	2009	Empezar Desde Cero	Latin Pop Album of the Year	Nominated	
Lo Nuestro Awards	2009	RBD	Duo or Group of the Year	Nominated	
Lo Nuestro Awards	2009	"Inalcanzable"	Song of the Year	Nominated	
Lo Nuestro Awards	2021	"Siempre He Estado Aquí"	Pop Song of the Year	Nominated	
Lo Nuestro Awards	2024	RBD	Pop Group or Duo of the Year	Won	
Lo Nuestro Awards	2024	Soy Rebelde Tour	Tour of the Year	Nominated	
Meus Prêmios Nick	2006	RBD	Artista Internacional Favorito (Favorite International Artist)	Won	
Meus Prêmios Nick	2007	RBD	Artista Internacional Favorito (Favorite International Artist)	Nominated	
Meus Prêmios Nick	2008	RBD	Artista Internacional Favorito (Favorite International Artist)	Nominated	
Orgullosamente Latino Award	2006	RBD	Latin Group of the Year	Nominated	
Orgullosamente Latino Award	2007	RBD	Latin Group of the Year	Won	
Orgullosamente Latino Award	2007	Celestial	Latin Album of the Year	Won	
Orgullosamente Latino Award	2007	"No Pares"	Latin Song of the Year	Won	
Orgullosamente Latino Award	2007	"Ser o Parecer"	Latin Song of the Year	Nominated	
Orgullosamente Latino Award	2007	"Ser o Parecer"	Latin Music Video of the Year	Nominated	
Orgullosamente Latino Award	2008	RBD	Latin Group of the Year	Won	
Orgullosamente Latino Award	2008	Empezar Desde Cero	Latin Album of the Year	Nominated	
Orgullosamente Latino Award	2008	"Inalcanzable"	Latin Song of the Year	Nominated	
Orgullosamente Latino Award	2008	"Inalcanzable"	Latin Music Video of the Year	Won	
Premios Juventud	2005	RBD	Voz Del Momento	Won	
Premios Juventud	2005	RBD	Mi Ídolo Es...	Won	
Premios Juventud	2005	"Rebelde"	La Más Pegajosa	Nominated	
Premios Juventud	2005	Rebelde	Me Muero Sin Ese CD	Won	
Premios Juventud	2005	"Solo Quédate En Silencio"	Canción Corta-venas	Won	
Premios Juventud	2005	"Sálvame"	Canción Corta-venas	Nominated	
Premios Juventud	2006	RBD	Voz Del Momento	Won	
Premios Juventud	2006	RBD	Mi Concierto Favorito	Won	
Premios Juventud	2006	RBD	Artista Pop Favorito	Won	
Premios Juventud	2006	RBD	Mi Ídolo Es...	Won	
Premios Juventud	2006	RBD	En La Mira Del Paparazzi	Won	
Premios Juventud	2006	RBD	El Más Buscado	Won	
Premios Juventud	2006	"Aún Hay Algo"	La Más Pegajosa	Won	
Premios Juventud	2006	"Nuestro Amor"	La Más Pegajosa	Nominated	
Premios Juventud	2006	Nuestro Amor	Me Muero Sin Ese CD	Won	
Premios Juventud	2006	"Este Corazón"	Canción Corta-venas	Won	
Premios Juventud	2007	RBD	Voz Del Momento	Won	
Premios Juventud	2007	RBD	Artista Pop Favorito	Won	
Premios Juventud	2007	RBD	Mi Concierto Favorito	Won	
Premios Juventud	2007	RBD	En La Mira Del Paparazzi	Nominated	
Premios Juventud	2007	"Celestial"	La Más Pegajosa	Nominated	
Premios Juventud	2007	"Ser o Parecer"	La Más Pegajosa	Nominated	
Premios Juventud	2007	Celestial	Me Muero Sin Ese CD	Won	
Premios Juventud	2007	"Algún Día"	Canción Corta-venas	Won	
Premios Juventud	2007	"Celestial"	Mi Video Favorito	Nominated	
Premios Juventud	2007	"Ser o Parecer"	Mi Video Favorito	Nominated	
Premios Juventud	2008	RBD	Voz Del Momento	Nominated	
Premios Juventud	2008	RBD	Mi Artista Pop	Nominated	
Premios Juventud	2008	RBD	En La Mira Del Paparazzi	Nominated	
Premios Juventud	2008	RBD	El Más Buscado	Won	
Premios Juventud	2008	"Inalcanzable (Remix)" (feat. Jowell y Randy)	La Combinación Perfecta	Won	
Premios Juventud	2008	"Empezar Desde Cero"	La Más Pegajosa	Nominated	
Premios Juventud	2008	"Inalcanzable"	La Más Pegajosa	Nominated	
Premios Juventud	2008	Empezar Desde Cero	Me Muero Sin Ese CD	Nominated	
Premios Juventud	2008	Empezar Desde Cero World Tour	Mi Concierto Favorito	Nominated	
Premios Juventud	2008	"Inalcanzable"	Canción Corta-venas	Nominated	
Premios Juventud	2008	"Inalcanzable"	Mi Video Favorito	Nominated	
Premios Juventud	2008	"Empezar Desde Cero"	Mi Video Favorito	Nominated	
Premios Juventud	2009	RBD	El Más Buscado	Won	
Premios Juventud	2009	Gira del Adiós World Tour	Mi Concierto Favorito	Nominated	
Premios Juventud	2009	"Para Olvidarte de Mí"	La Más Pegajosa	Nominated	
Premios Juventud	2009	"Para Olvidarte de Mí"	Canción Corta-venas	Nominated	
Premios Juventud	2009	"Para Olvidarte de Mí"	Mi Video Favorito	Nominated	
Premios Juventud	2009	"Para Olvidarte de Mí"	Mi Ringtone	Nominated	
Premios Oye!	2005	RBD	New Artist of the Year	Won	
Premios Oye!	2005	Rebelde	Pop Album of the Year - Duo or Group	Won	
Premios Oye!	2005	Rebelde	Best Selling Pop Album of the Year	Won	
Premios Oye!	2006	Nuestro Amor	Pop Album of the Year - Duo or Group	Nominated	
Premios Oye!	2008	RBD	Pop in Spanish, Group (Pop en Español, Grupo)	Nominated	
Premios TVyNovelas	2006	"Rebelde"	Best Musical Theme	Won	
Premios Amigo	2007	RBD	Premio Intermon Oxfam Artista Internacional Más Vendido	Won	
Premios HTV	2007	RBD	Premio HTV ORO	Won	
Premios Lunas del Auditorio	2008	RBD	Mejor Artista Pop en Español	Nominated	
Premios Mi TRL Awards	2007	"Tu Amor"	Premio Pepsi Mi TRL Al Favorito de la Teleaudiencia	Won	
Premios Mi TRL Awards	2007	RBD	Premio "They killed it" (Mejor Presentacion del Año)	Nominated	
Premios Terra	2006	RBD	Lo Mejor de la Música Latina	Won	
Pollstar Awards	2023	Soy Rebelde Tour	Latin Tour of the Year	Nominated	
World Music Award	2006	RBD	World's Best Selling Latin American Artist	Nominated	
