= Best Of (RBD album) =

2008 RBD compilation album

Greatest hits album by RBD
- Released: September 23, 2008
- Recorded: 2004–2007
- Studio: Various
- Genre: Pop
- Length: 54:48
- Language: Spanish • English
- Label: EMI
- Producer: Pedro Damián

RBD chronology
Empezar Desde Cero (2007)	Best Of (2008)	Para olvidarte de mí (2009)

Best Of is the second compilation album by the Mexican pop band RBD, released in September 2008 in Mexico and October in South America and the United States. The album compiles all of the singles included in the group's first five studio albums, Rebelde (2004), Nuestro Amor (2005), Celestial (2006), Rebels (2006) and Empezar desde Cero (2007), plus a studio version from "No Pares", a track released on the band's Live In Hollywood album (2006). The album was certified Gold in Serbia and Ecuador.

The only singles not included on the album are "México, México", "Dame", "Wanna Play", "Money Money" and "Y No Puedo Olvidarte".

== Best Of RBD ==
=== Track listings ===
CD

No.	Title	Writer(s)	Length
1.	"Rebelde"	DJ Kafka (Note: Carlos Lara billed as DJ Kafka); Max Di Carlo	3:32
2.	"Solo Quédate En Silencio"	Mauricio Arriaga	3:37
3.	"Un Poco de Tu Amor"	Kafka; Di Carlo	3:24
4.	"Sálvame"	Kafka; Di Carlo; Pedro Damián	3:43
5.	"No Pares"	Lynda Thomas; Carlos Lara	3:47
6.	"Nuestro Amor"	Memo Méndez Guiu; Emil "Billy" Méndez	3:33
7.	"Aún Hay Algo"	Lara; Karen Sokoloff (Note: Max Di Carlo billed as Karen Sokoloff)	3:34
8.	"Este Corazón"	Armando Ávila	3:29
9.	"Tras De Mi"	Lara; Sokoloff; Damián	3:11
10.	"Tu Amor"	Diane Warren	4:37
11.	"Ser o Parecer"	Ávila	3:31
12.	"Celestial"	Lara; Damián	3:28
13.	"Bésame Sin Miedo"	Chico Bennett; John Igoldsby	3:32
14.	"Inalcanzable"	Lara	4:14
15.	"Empezar Desde Cero"	Ávila	3:16

=== Best Of RBD: (Incluye todos los videos de RBD) ===
Best Of RBD

Greatest hits album by RBD
- Released: September 23, 2008
- Recorded: 2004–2007
- Studio: Various
- Genre: Pop
- Language: Spanish • English
- Label: EMI
- Producer: Various

RBD chronology
Hecho En España (2007)	Best Of RBD (2008)	Greatest Hits (2008)

The regular version of the CD released by EMI includes a DVD with the group's music videos. In Brazil, the DVD was released separately.

The DVD "Best Of RBD" is a version of the CD of the same name, which contains all the video clips that the group produced during their four years of career.

The compilation does not contain the last video clip of the group, titled, "Para Olvidarte De Mí", which was released a few months after the launch of the project.

1. "Rebelde"
2. "Sólo Quédate en Silencio"
3. "Sálvame"
4. "No Pares" (Live video)
5. "Nuestro Amor"
6. "Aún Hay Algo"
7. "Tu Amor"
8. "Ser o Parecer"
9. "Celestial"
10. "Bésame Sin Miedo"
11. "Inalcanzable"
12. "Empezar desde Cero

=== Charts ===
Chart	Peak Position
Argentine Albums Chart	7
Croatian Albums Chart	2
Ecuadorian Albums Chart	1
Mexican Albums Chart	24
Slovenian Albums Chart	1
Spanish Albums Chart	49
Venezuelan Albums Chart	9

=== Certifications ===
Country	Certification
Ecuador	Gold
Slovenia	Gold

=== Release history ===
Country	Release date
Mexico	September 23, 2008
Spain	November 18, 2008

== Hits Em Português ==
Hits Em Português

Greatest hits album by RBD
- Released: October 22, 2008
- Genre: Pop
- Length: 52:12
- Language: Portuguese
- Label: EMI

RBD chronology
Best Of RBD (2008)	Hits Em Português (2008)	Greatest Hits (2008)

Hits Em Português is a compilation by RBD, released on October 22, 2008. The tracklist is a collection of tracks from the three Portuguese albums that the band released from 2005 to 2006. The album does not feature any new tracks, therefore there wasn't any official singles taken from it.

Track listing

All tracks are written by Claudio Rabello.

No.	Title	Length
1.	"Salva-me"	3:45
2.	"Ser ou Parecer"	3:35
3.	"Celestial (Português)"	3:27
4.	"Beija-me Sem Medo"	3:22
5.	"Rebelde (Português)"	3:35
6.	"Esse Coração"	3:29
7.	"Ao Seu Lado"	3:48
8.	"Ensina-me"	3:41
9.	"Nosso Amor"	3:37
10.	"Fique Em Silêncio"	3:40
11.	"O Que Há Por Trás?"	3:18
12.	"Talvez Depois"	3:08
13.	"Querer-te"	3:19
14.	"Um Pouco Desse Amor"	3:22
15.	"Venha de Novo o Amor"	3:35

== Greatest Hits ==
Greatest Hits

Greatest hits album by RBD
- Released: November 25, 2008
- Recorded: 2004–2008
- Genre: Pop
- Length: 44:05
- Languages: Spanish; English
- Label: EMI
- Producers: Armando Ávila; Carlos Lara; Max di Carlo; Pedro Damián (exec.)

RBD chronology
Hits Em Português (2008)	Greatest Hits (2008)	Para Olvidarte De Mí (2009)

Greatest Hits is the American version of Best Of. Greatest Hits is RBD's first compilation album released in the United States. The compilation was released on November 25, 2008, in CD and DVD formats. Greatest Hits looks back on the major hits that RBD achieved all around the world during their first four years as an international pop sensation. The compilation has different content for the United States public that differs from the content in Best Of and its Brazilian counterpart Hits Em Português. Among those differences are the inclusion of the song "Estar Bien", featuring Chilean pop group Kudai and Mexican singer Eiza González, a karaoke track, a historical photo gallery, and that, contrary to its counterparts, which both boasted 15 tracks each, the album only includes 11 of RBD's greatest hits. The compilation's accompanying DVD contains the music videos for the songs present in the CD, plus karaoke and the making of the video for "Empezar Desde Cero".

The compilation album peaked at #37 on the US Billboard Top Latin Albums chart and reached #9 on the Billboard Latin Pop Albums ranking.

=== Track listing ===
Greatest Hits
No.	Title	Writer(s)	Producer(s)	Length
1.	"Rebelde"	DJ Kafka; Max di Carlo	Carlos Lara; di Carlo	3:33
2.	"Sólo Quédate en Silencio"	Mauricio L. Arriaga	Armando Ávila	3:39
3.	"Sálvame"	DJ Kafka; di Carlo; Pedro Damián	Lara; di Carlo	3:42
4.	"Nuestro Amor"	Memo Méndez Guiú; Emil "Billy" Méndez	Ávila	3:35
5.	"Aún Hay Algo"	Lara; Karen Sokoloff	Lara; di Carlo	3:36
6.	"Este Corazón"	Ávila	Ávila	3:30
7.	"Tu Amor"	Diane Warren		4:39
8.	"Ser O Parecer"	Ávila	Ávila	3:33
9.	"Celestial"	Lara; Damián	Lara	3:29
10.	"Inalcanzable"	Lara	Lara; Gustavo Borner^{[a]}	4:20
11.	"Empezar Desde Cero"	Ávila	Ávila	3:16
12.	"Estar Bien" (featuring Kudai and Eiza González)	Lara		3:13
Total length:				44:05

Greatest Hits – Bonus material
No.	Title	Writer(s)	Length
1.	"Empezar Desde Cero" (Karaoke)	Ávila
2.	"Photo gallery"	Lara, di Carlo

Notes

- "Tu Amor" was originally recorded by American singer Jon B. on his album Cool Relax (1997).
- ^{^[a]} signifies a co-producer

=== Greatest Hits DVD ===
Greatest Hits

Greatest hits album by RBD
- Released: November 25, 2008
- Recorded: 2004–2008
- Genre: Pop
- Languages: Spanish; English
- Label: EMI
- Producers: Armando Ávila; Carlos Lara; Max di Carlo; Pedro Damián (exec.)

RBD chronology
Best Of RBD (2008)	Greatest Hits (2008)	Live in Brasilia (2009)

The Greatest Hits DVD contains 11 of RBD's music videos, spanning the four years that marked the group's impressive musical history. The DVD also contains the karaoke version of "Inalcanzable" and the making of the video for "Empezar Desde Cero".

=== Track listing ===
1. "Rebelde"
2. "Solo Quédate en Silencio"
3. "Sálvame"
4. "Nuestro Amor"
5. "Aún Hay Algo"
6. "Este Corazón"
7. "Tu Amor"
8. "Ser o Parecer"
9. "Celestial"
10. "Inalcanzable"
11. "Empezar Desde Cero"

Bonus material

- "Inalcanzable" (Karaoke)
- "Empezar Desde Cero" (Making-of)

=== Personnel ===
Credits adapted from the album and DVD liner notes.

Performance credits

- RBD – primary artist, choruses
- Kudai – featured vocals, choruses (Greatest Hits CD, track 12)
- Eiza González – featured vocals, choruses (Greatest Hits CD, track 12)

Production

- Luis Luisillo Miguel – associate producer
- Pedro Damián – executive producer
- Televisa En Vivo – management
- Armando Ávila – producer
- Max di Carlo – producer
- Carlos Lara – producer
- Carolina Palomo – production coordinator

=== Charts ===
Chart (2008)	Peak position
US Billboard Top Latin Albums	37
US Billboard Latin Pop Albums	9

=== Release history ===
Region	Date	Format	Label
United States	November 25, 2008	CD, digital download, DVD	EMI
