= Live in Brasília =

Live album by RBD
- Released: March 26, 2009 (DVD); October 5, 2020 (CD, streaming)
- Recorded: April 21, 2008
- Venue: Esplanada dos Ministérios; Brasília, Brazil
- Genre: Latin pop
- Length: 90:17
- Language: Spanish • English
- Label: EMI; Capitol

RBD chronology
Greatest Hits (2008)	Live in Brasília (2009)	Tournée do Adeus (2009)

Live in Brasília is the fifth live concert by Mexican Latin pop group RBD. The material was recorded at the Esplanada dos Ministérios in Brasília, Brazil on April 21, 2008, in a front of a crowd of more than 500,000 people, the biggest show of the band's career. The live video album shows the free concert RBD presented during the 48th anniversary of the Brazilian capital, which formed part of the group's Empezar Desde Cero World Tour (2008). The DVD was released in Brazil on March 26, 2009 and in Mexico on June 9, 2009. The CD and streaming were released worldwide on October 5, 2020.

== Background ==
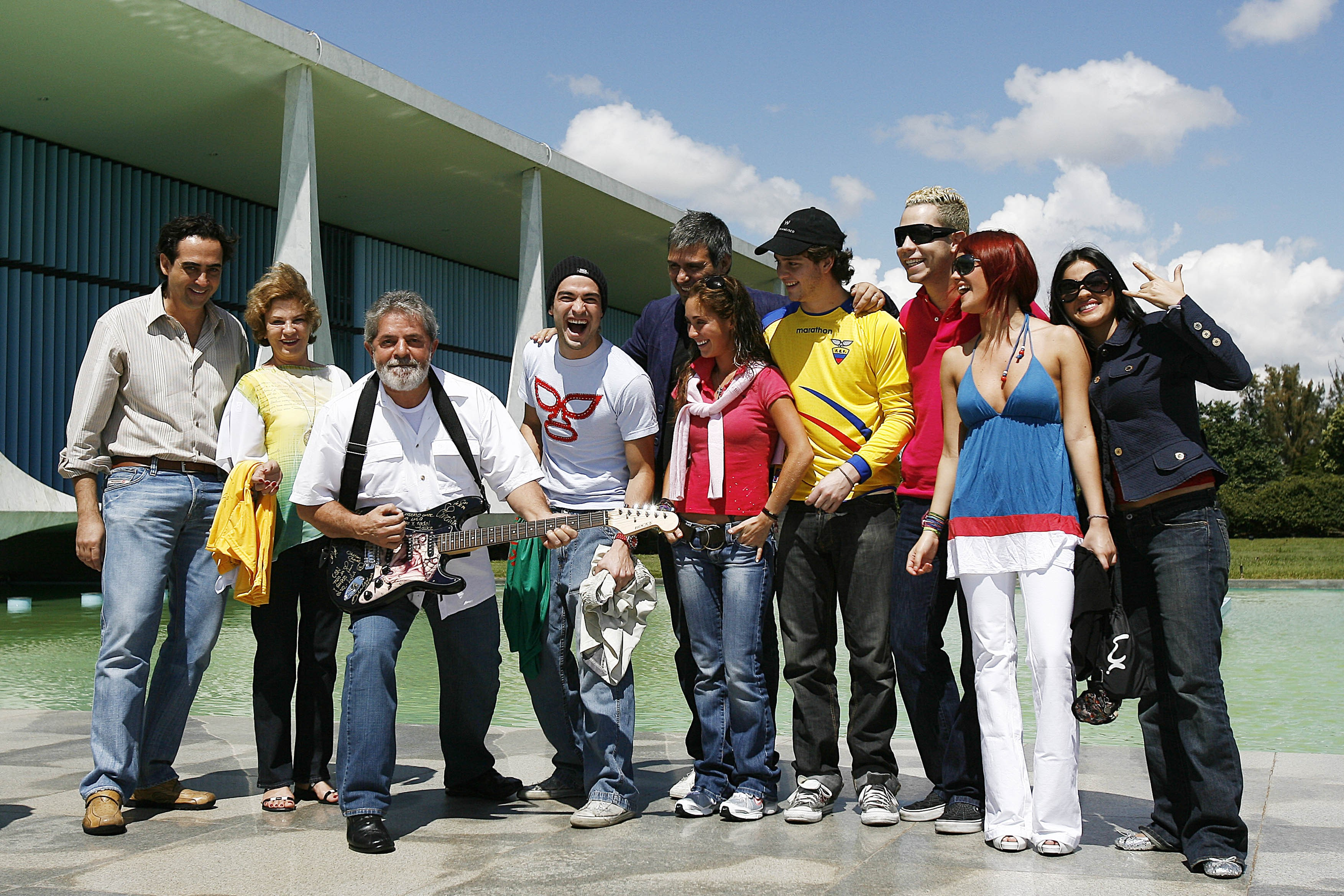
RBD with the former president of Brazil, Luiz Inácio Lula da Silva, and his wife Marisa Silva, in April 2007.

In April 2008, RBD arrived in Brazil to present their second worldwide concert tour, the Empezar Desde Cero World Tour. When the group came to Brasília, then president of Brazil, Luiz Inácio Lula da Silva, invited the group to his house, where they shared a barbecue and a friendly game of soccer. After that, the president invited the group to present themselves on the 48th anniversary of the Brazilian capital, which would take place the following year.

== Concert synopsis and release ==
In the middle of the celebrations of the 48th anniversary of the Brazilian capital, Brasília, on April 21, 2008, RBD presented themselves in a free concert to almost a million people in the Esplanada dos Ministérios. This was the show with the biggest attendance of RBD's Tour Celestial and also the concert with the highest attendance of the band's entire career. The concert's setlist mostly featured songs from the album Empezar Desde Cero and some of the group's biggest hits from their previous albums.

In comparison to RBD's previous live concert DVD releases, this was the one that took the longest to be released. Almost a year after the concert had been held, Brazil was the first country to get the release, on March 26, 2009. Soon after, it was released in the United States and in Mexico on June 9, 2009. On July 14, 2009, the DVD was released in Spain. The actual concert earned the distinction of being one of the 10 largest international shows ever held in Brazil.

== Track list ==
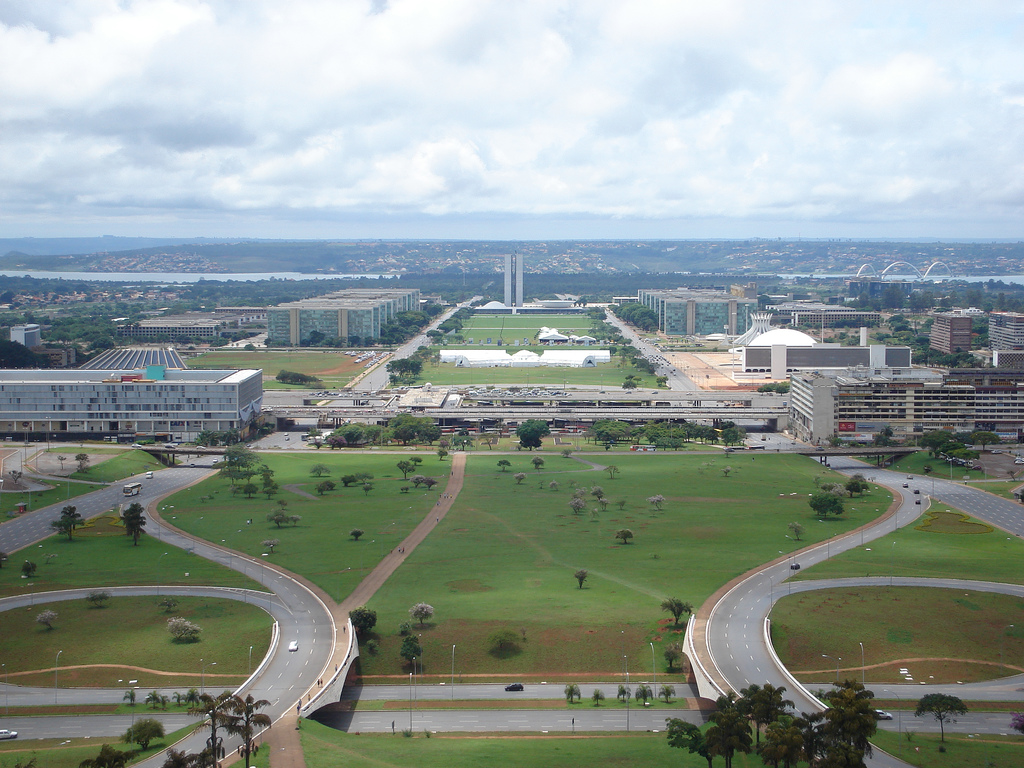
The Esplanada dos Ministérios, where the live concert DVD was recorded.

1. Intro Desde Cero
2. "Fui La Niña"
3. "Money Money"
4. "Me Voy"
5. "Ser o Parecer"
6. "Dame"
7. Medley Rebelde: "Tenerte y Quererte" / "Un poco de tu amor" / "Otro Día Que Va" / "Solo Quédate En Silencio"
8. "Inalcanzable"
9. "I Wanna Be the Rain"
10. "Bésame Sin Miedo"
11. "Este Corazón"
12. "A Tu Lado"
13. "Sálvame"
14. "Y No Puedo Olvidarte"
15. "No Pares"
16. "Empezar Desde Cero"
17. Medley Solos: "No Digas Nada" / "Si No Estás Aquí" / "El Mundo Detrás" / "Sueles Volver"
18. "Extraña Sensación"
19. "Celestial"
20. "Aún Hay Algo"
21. "Tras de Mí"
22. "Rebelde"

Bonus material

- Behind the scenes – 12:58

Notes

- The entire show leaked into the Internet in mid March 2009, to mixed reviews from fans.
- Although it was rumored by fans that the songs "Nuestro Amor" and "Cuando El Amor Se Acaba" were cut from the DVD release, these songs were not included on RBD's actual tour setlist.

== Personnel ==
Credits adapted from the DVD's liner notes.

Recording location

- Esplanada dos Ministérios (Brasília, Brazil)

Mixing locations

- LCM Records Studios

Performance credits

- RBD – main artist
- Güido Laris – choruses
- Charly Rey – choruses

Musicians

- Güido Laris – acoustic guitar, bass, musical direction
- Mauricio Soto "Bicho" – drums
- Charly Rey – acoustic guitar, lead guitar
- Eddie Tellez – keyboards, piano
- Luis Emilio Arreaza "Catire" – percussion

Production

- Luis Luisillo Miguel – associate producer
- Thiago Pires – audio assistant
- Marcos Possato – audio assistant
- Juan Orlando Calzada – audio engineer
- Arnaldo Ferreira – audio logistics
- Gabisom – audio recording
- Julio Cezar Lara – authoring
- Jose Gonzales – bodyguard
- Oscar Macias – bodyguard
- Paulo Carrera – coordination
- Ornela Ferrari – coordination
- Carolina Palomo – coordination
- William Ricardo – coordination
- Jose Roberto Ferreira – crew logistics
- Djair Silva – electrotechnician
- Antonio Sobrinho – engineer
- Milton Urcioli – executive director
- Pedro Damián – executive producer
- Sandra Ferraz – executive producer, production director
- Raphael Bethlen – DVD direction, making-of director
- Leo Ferraz – DVD direction, making-of director
- Santiago Ferraz – DVD direction
- Jerónimo Ramírez – lighting
- Mondo Entretenimiento Rafael Reisman – local promoter
- William John Murphy – make-up, wardrobe
- Danilo Cardoso – making-of editor
- Juan Carlos Rosas – marketing
- Adriano Daga – mastering, mixing
- Jotaeme – mobile unit team
- Gustavo Zertuche – monitor engineer
- Güido Laris – musical direction, programming, sequencing
- Carlos Alberto Carvhalo – operation supervisor
- Reginaldo Dias – operator
- Paulo Rogerio – operator
- Ricardo Márquez – personal manager
- Juan Manuel Puerto "El Oso" – personal manager
- Bruno Lima – photography director
- Marcelo Ferraz – Pro Tools, recording engineer
- Pedro – Pro Tools editing
- Bia Tabosa – production director
- Dante Gudiño – production manager
- Richard Bull – promoter
- Roptus.com – promoter
- Ignacio Rodríguez – promoter
- Guillermo Rosas – promoter
- Roberto Gómez – publicist
- Leo Richter – screen design, video editing
- Dorival Dellias Filho (Chateau) – TV direction
- Lazaro Filho – technical assistant
- Carlos Gomes – technical assistant
- Arnaldo Itahaji – technical assistant
- Amado Jr. – technical assistant
- Rodrigo Lisboa – technical assistant
- Geraldo Magela – technical assistant
- Hilton Menezes – technical assistant
- Jose Silva – technical assistant
- Jose Augusto Silva Jr. – technical assistant
- Tiago Franco Silva – technical assistant
- Antonio Rabelo – technical assistant
- Alexandre Nobrega Sobrinho – technician
- Jason Thibault – tour controller
- Katia Peña – tour manager
- Christian Rodríguez – video director
- LCM Records – video production

== Charts ==
Chart (2009)	Peak position
Brazil ABPD Music DVD Chart	2
Spain PROMUSICAE Music DVD Chart	15

== Release history ==
Country	Release date	Format	Label
Brazil	March 26, 2009	DVD	EMI
Mexico	June 9, 2009	DVD	EMI
United States	June 9, 2009	DVD	EMI
Spain	July 14, 2009	DVD	EMI
Mexico	October 5, 2020	Triple CD-DVD, download digital, streaming	Universal
Worldwide	October 5, 2020	Download digital, streaming	Universal
