= Tournée do Adeus =

Live album by RBD

Live album by RBD
- Released: December 2, 2009
- Recorded: November 29, 2008
- Venue: Anhembi Convention Center; São Paulo-SP, Brazil
- Genre: Pop; Latin pop
- Length: 89:30
- Language: Spanish; English
- Label: EMI; Record Entretenimiento

RBD chronology
Live In Brasília (2009)	Tournée do Adeus (2009)	Ser O Parecer: The Global Virtual Union (En Vivo) (2021)

Tournée Do Adeus is the sixth and last live concert by Mexican pop band RBD. The DVD was filmed in São Paulo, Brazil on November 29, 2008, in front of more than 25,000 people as part of the group's last worldwide concert tour, the Gira Del Adiós. The DVD features the farewell concert of the Mexican group in Brazil, which was captured with high definition cameras, 5.1 digital surround sound, PCM 2.0 and included exclusive interviews with the artists. Though the DVD was released worldwide by the EMI label, Brazil was the first country to launch this product, on December 2, 2009.

== Background and release ==
During RBD's last concert tour, titled Gira Del Adiós, the Mexican group held five concerts in Brazil, in partnership with Brazilian label Record Entretenimiento. The concerts were held in Brasília (at the Nilson Nelson Gymnasium), Fortaleza, Ceará (at the Siará Hall), Porto Alegre (at Pepsi on Stage), Rio de Janeiro (at the HSBC Arena) and in São Paulo (at the Anhembi Convention Center). A few days later, RBD performed two extra shows, which would be their last in the country, in São Paulo and in Rio de Janeiro.

The show was first broadcast on December 13, 2008, 14 days after the concert was held, by Brazilian television network Rede Record as a year-end special. The broadcast was made possible due to the contract signed that year between the São Paulo network and Televisa, the group's original broadcaster. However, the official DVD for the concert would not be released for an entire year and 3 days after the actual show was held, on December 2, 2009.

== Content ==
The DVD contains the recorded show held in the city of São Paulo on November 29, 2008. The concert's setlist contained RBD's biggest hits throughout their four-year career, including "Cariño Mío", "Rebelde", "Ser O Parecer", "Sálvame", "Me Voy", "No Pares", "Inalcanzable", "Hoy Que Te Vas", and "Empezar Desde Cero". The live video release was produced by the São Paulo studio LCM Records, which had previously produced the group's Live in Rio (recorded in 2006 at the Maracanã Stadium) and Live in Brasília (recorded in 2008 at the Esplanada dos Ministérios).

== Reception ==
The release encountered a mixed reception by fans of the group. Some expressed dislike that the DVD eliminated the parts where the RBD members talked to the audience; the song "Te Daría Todo", sung a capella and accompanied by a Portuguese-language poem recited by member Dulce María; the group's tribute to its executive producer, Pedro Damián, who was celebrating his birthday that day with the group's song "Feliz Cumpleaños"; and the instrumental intermission where the band presented its musicians, which had been included in all the previous concert DVDs of the group.

The lukewarm reception by fans came as a result of these unexpected cuts, because allegedly the EMI label had promised that the show would be released in full.

== Track list ==
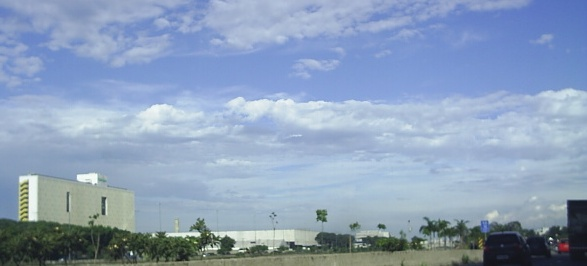
The Anhembi Convention Center, where the concert DVD was filmed

1. "Intro"
2. "Cariño Mío" - 4:17
3. "Aún Hay Algo" - 3:34
4. "Celestial" - 3:27
5. "Un Poco De Tu Amor" - 4:38
6. "Otro Día Que Va" - 3:33
7. "Ser O Parecer" - 3:27
8. "Hoy Que Te Vas" - 3:31
9. "Solo Quédate En Silencio" - 3:32
10. "Inalcanzable" - 4:11
11. "Y No Puedo Olvidarte" - 3:35
12. "Light Up The World Tonight" - 5:27
13. "Sálvame" - 4:17
14. "Este Corazón" - 3:26
15. "Tu Amor" - 5:20
16. "No Pares" - 3:28
17. "Empezar Desde Cero" - 3:14
18. "Solo Para Ti" - 4:04
19. "Me Voy" - 3:32
20. "Qué Hay Detrás" - 3:47
21. "Bésame Sin Miedo" - 3:28
22. "Nuestro Amor" - 3:54
23. "Tras de Mí" - 3:44
24. "Rebelde" - 4:08

Bonus material

- Interview with Christopher Uckermann - 1:48
- Interview with Christian Chávez - 1:50
- Interview with Alfonso Herrera - 1:49
- Interview with Dulce María - 2:29
- Interview with Anahí - 2:59
- Interview with Maite Perroni - 3:34
- Exclusive special interview with the band - 3:12

== Release history ==
Country	Release date	Format	Label
Worldwide	December 2, 2009	Video (DVD)	EMI; Record Entretenimiento
Worldwide	November 16, 2020	Streaming and download digital album	Universal Music
