= Tour del Adiós =

2008 concert tour by RBD

Gira Del Adiós
- Tour by RBD
- Location: South America; North America; Europe
- Associated albums: Various
- Start date: November 1, 2008
- End date: December 21, 2008
- No. of shows: 19 (concerts); 1 (performance)
- Supporting act: Pee Wee (Brazil only)

RBD concert chronology
- Empezar Desde Cero World Tour (2008); Gira Del Adiós (2008); Soy Rebelde Tour (2023)

Gira Del Adiós or Tour Del Adiós (Turnê Do Adeus in Brazil) was the fourth concert tour by Mexican pop group RBD. The tour visited South America, North America and Europe starting on November 1, 2008 and ending December 21, with 19 official concerts, as well as a televised performance. This was initially RBD's final tour, but they reunited for the Soy Rebelde Tour in 2023.

== Production ==
Following the announcement of their separation, RBD said that they planned a last tour to say goodbye. The tour included about 20 shows in countries such as Argentina, Venezuela, Ecuador, Paraguay, Chile, and Brazil.

In November 2008, the group began the tour in the following cities: La Paz (Bolivia), Buenos Aires, Cordoba and Rosario (Argentina), Fortaleza, Porto Alegre, Rio de Janeiro, São Paulo and Brasília (Brazil).

In December, shows by RBD were presented in the cities of Los Angeles (America), then back to Brazil for two extra concerts in São Paulo and Rio de Janeiro; Guayaquil, Quito (Ecuador ), Lima (Peru), Santiago (Chile), Ljubljana (Slovenia), Belgrade (Serbia), and Madrid Spain.

They had a performance only 9 minutes at Teletón on December 6, 2008 to say goodbye to fans in their home country Mexico.

== Notes ==
- The singer Pee Wee only opened the concerts of the group in Brazil (except the extra two shows).
- The group came back again to Brazil to do two extra shows in the country. Maite Perroni was absent in some shows due to her work in Cuidado Con El Ángel.

== Broadcasts and recordings ==
- Tournée do Adeus

The special O Adeus was broadcast by television network RecordTV (Brazil). The group officially disbanded on March 10, 2009 with the launch of its latest studio album of (Para Olvidarte De Mí), but with one last special, "O Adeus" ("The Goodbye"), the "Turnê Do Adeus" (Gira del Adiós or Tour del Adiós).

== Setlist ==
1. "Cariño Mío"
2. "Aún Hay Algo"
3. "Celestial"
4. "Un Poco de tu Amor"
5. "Otro Día que Va"
6. "Ser o Parecer"
7. "Hoy Que Te Vas"
8. "Solo Quédate en Silencio"
9. "Inalcanzable"
10. "Y No Puedo Olvidarte"
11. "Light up the World Tonight"
12. "Sálvame"
13. "Este Corazón"
14. "Tu Amor"
15. "No Pares"
16. "Empezar Desde Cero"
17. "Solo Para Ti"
18. "Me Voy"
19. "Qué Hay Detrás"
20. "Bésame Sin Miedo"
21. "Nuestro Amor"
22. "Tras de Mí"
23. "Rebelde"

== Tour dates ==
List of concerts, showing date, city, country, venue and opening acts
Date (2008)	City	Country	Venue	Opening act
November 1	La Paz	Bolivia	Estadio Hernando Siles	—N/a
November 7	Buenos Aires	Argentina	Luna Park	—N/a
November 8	Córdoba	Argentina	Orfeo Superdomo	—N/a
November 9	Rosario	Argentina	Estadio Newell's Old Boys	—N/a
November 25	Fortaleza	Brazil	Siara Hall	Pee Wee
November 27	Porto Alegre	Brazil	Pepsi On Stage	Pee Wee
November 28	Rio de Janeiro	Brazil	HSBC Arena	Pee Wee
November 29	São Paulo	Brazil	Arena Skol Anhembi	Pee Wee
November 30	Brasília	Brazil	Ginásio Nilson Nelson	Pee Wee
December 5	Los Angeles	United States	Gibson Amphitheatre	—N/a
December 9	São Paulo	Brazil	HSBC Brasil	—N/a
December 10	Rio de Janeiro	Brazil	Vivo Rio	—N/a
December 11	Guayaquil	Ecuador	Coliseo Voltaire Paladines Polo	—N/a
December 12	Quito	Ecuador	Coliseo General Rumiñahui	—N/a
December 13	Lima	Peru	Estadio Nacional	—N/a
December 14	Santiago	Chile	Arena Santiago	—N/a
December 16	Ljubljana	Slovenia	Hala Tivoli	—N/a
December 18	Belgrade	Serbia	Belgrade Arena	—N/a
December 21	Madrid	Spain	Palacio de Los Deportes	—N/a

=== Performance date ===
List of performance, showing date, city, country, venue and opening acts
Date (2008)	City	Country	Venue	Note
December 6	Mexico City	Mexico	Teletón 2008	9 minutes

== Awards ==
Year	Ceremony	Award	Result	Ref.
2009	Billboard Latin Music Awards	Tour of the Year	Won	
2009	Premios Juventud	My Favorite Concert	Nominated	
