= Empezar Desde Cero =

2007 RBD album

Studio album by RBD
- Released: November 20, 2007
- Recorded: 2007
- Studios: Igloo Music Studios (Burbank, California); Elth Studios (Mexico)
- Genres: Latin pop; dance-pop; pop rock
- Length: 48:06
- Languages: Spanish; English (Argentinian version)
- Label: EMI
- Producers: Armando Ávila; Carlos Lara

RBD chronology
Hecho En España (2007)	Empezar Desde Cero (2007)	Empezar Desde Cero (Fan Edition) (2008)

Singles from Empezar desde Cero
- 1. "Inalcanzable" Released: October 8, 2007; 2. "Empezar Desde Cero" Released: January 29, 2008; 3. "Y No Puedo Olvidarte" Released: June 5, 2008

Professional ratings
Review scores
Source	Rating
AllMusic	3.5/5 stars

Empezar Desde Cero (English: Starting From Zero) is the fifth studio album by Mexican pop group RBD, released simultaneously in Mexico and the United States on November 20, 2007.

The album contains two songs composed by two of RBD's band members: Alfonso Herrera and Christopher Uckermann. Empezar Desde Cero falls into the genres of Latin pop and pop rock. The album received a nomination for 'Best Pop Album by a Duo/Group with Vocals' at the 9th Annual Latin Grammy Awards in 2008.

In the United States, Empezar Desde Cero debuted at #1 on both the Billboard Top Latin Albums and Billboard Latin Pop Albums charts, while peaking at #60 on the main Billboard 200 chart. In Mexico, the album reached #4 on the Mexican Albums Chart and sold 100,000 copies there, attaining a Platinum certification, as well as a 4×Platinum certification for pre-loaded sales of 400,000 copies. In Spain album peaked at #4 on the Spanish Albums Chart.

As part of the album's promotion, the album's lead single, "Inalcanzable", was released on October 8, 2007. The single peaked at #6 on the US Billboard Hot Latin Songs chart, becoming the group's last top-ten hit on the ranking, but reached #2 on the US Billboard Latin Pop Songs subchart. On January 29, 2008, the second single off the album, the title track "Empezar Desde Cero", was released. The song's main vocals are performed solely by Maite Perroni. Lastly, the third and final single from the album, "Y No Puedo Olvidarte", was released on June 5, 2008. The song was promoted by a live performance at the 2008 Premios Juventud but did not count with the support of a music video as the album's previous two singles.

== Background ==
"It's a different album where you can notice the evolution and change in the group, it's more calm, with romantic ballads, it's not so dance-y anymore, it's for a more grown-up audience, who without a doubt has grown up with us. It's an evolution for all of us."

—Dulce María talking about the album.

In 2006, RBD released their third studio album, Celestial, and immediately the group started a world tour to promote the album, the Tour Celestial. Months after the tour had started, in 2007, the group announced that the recording sessions for a new album could start after the end of the tour. Contrary to what was stated by the group, with the Tour Celestial still ongoing and in the midst of the group's hectic promotion and business events schedules, RBD started to record Empezar Desde Cero on August 30, 2007. The album's recording process lasted a month and was held in studios in Mexico and Burbank, California.

Different to RBD's previous studio albums, Empezar Desde Cero contained songwriting by some of the group's members. In addition to self-written songs by the group's members, the album contained more full solo tracks than the group's earlier albums. Previously, it was Christopher Uckermann and Alfonso Herrera who were lacking in solo-tracks, but for Empezar Desde Cero they both wrote their solo songs featured on the album; "Sueles Volver", composed and performed by Christopher, and "Si No Estás Aquí", written and performed by Alfonso. A demo version of the first leaked onto the Internet in May 2007, even before the album was announced.

The album also contains Spanish adaptations of songs previously recorded or written in English. The song "Fui La Niña" was originally titled "Being A Good Girl", while "Extraña Sensación" was called "Let's See Where It Goes". "Amor Fugaz" is a Spanish adaptation of the song "Love is All There Is", first recorded by Dana International for her album Free, but released after Sabrina Salerno's version, released on her album A Flower's Broken. The Spanish track lyrically differs greatly from its original version.

== Artwork ==
For the album's cover, a picture of RBD in front of a simple black backdrop was used. The typography used was also very simple and used red highlighting in some words. On the album's cover, the six members of RBD are seen seated in wooden benches and chairs. Anahí appears reclining on a wooden bench wearing a leather jacket over a green dress, holding a strand of her hair. Behind her, Christian is seen wearing a black sweater over a white T-shirt and khaki baggy pants. The singer is seen holding Maite's hand, who appears wearing a black dress and sitting behind Dulce María. The group's famous redhead is sitting in a wooden bench besides Anahí, also wearing a black dress, but under a grey sweater. Behind her is Alfonso, wearing a black leather jacket, and Christopher seated at his side, dressed similarly. Regarding the album cover's photo shoot, Alfonso commented: "It's not that overproduced in regards to the wardrobe, it's rather ultra-relaxed because as the album's title says, it's staring from zero."

== Production and release ==
In August 2007, RBD's manager, Pedro Damián, announced the release of the new album for late November of that year. Damián also revealed that around twelve songs were selected for the album, after having listened to approximately 1,000 songs, and that at the same time, the album could contain songs written by the group's members. During the first "Worldwide RBD Day" press conference, on October 4, 2007, RBD themselves confirmed the name of the album and announced it would in fact have its release in November. Later it was further confirmed that the album would be released worldwide on November 20, 2007.

The album was recorded in Mexico and Burbank, California. Empezar Desde Cero was produced by Carlos Lara and Armando Ávila and contains 13 songs, some of which had members of RBD itself participating in their composition, like "Sueles Volver" and "Si No Estás Aquí. The first single released to promote Empezar Desde Cero was "Inalcanzable", a song written by Carlos Lara, which was released to radio stations worldwide on October 8, 2007.

Wal-Mart stores, which first released the album's official track list, also released an enhanced version of the album which featured a bonus DVD entitled Así Es RBD. The bonus DVD included a one-hour documentary of never before seen footage, music videos, scenes from RBD's originating telenovela, Rebelde, and live performances.

On January 29, 2008, the album's second single was announced to be "Empezar Desde Cero". The single was chosen by fans through an online poll on the group's official website.

On February 8, 2008, Empezar Desde Cero was finally issued in Argentina as a special edition, which included as bonus tracks some of RBD's hits from their previous studio albums.

The album's last single was "Y No Puedo Olvidarte", which did not receive the same promotion as part of RBD's record label, EMI. This was due to the fact that the single was released at the same time RBD announced their disbandment, therefore provoking the cancelation of any remaining promotion for Empezar Desde Cero to give way to the recording of the group's last studio album.

Empezar Desde Cero is RBD's second studio album and first Spanish album to not have a Portuguese-language version released in Brazil.

== Promotion ==
=== Singles ===
The album's first single was "Inalcanzable". The song was confirmed as the official lead single during RBD's press conference for the first "Worldwide RBD Day", held on October 4, 2007. On October 8, 2007, the song was made available for purchase as a digital download. The single reasched #2 on Billboard magazine's Latin Pop Songs chart and peaked at #6 on Billboard Hot Latin Songs. The song was well received by music critics and garnered award nominations on Premios Lo Nuestro, Premios Orgullosamente Latino and Premios Juventud. The song's official remix, which featured reggaeton duo Jowell & Randy and reggaeton solo artist De La Ghetto, won the award for 'The Perfect Combo' at the 2008 Premios Juventud. The song's music video was directed by Esteban Madrazo and shot on November 7, 2007, and won the award for 'Latin Video of the Year' at the 2008 Premios Orgullosamente Latino.

On January 29, 2008, the album's second single was released, the title track "Empezar Desde Cero". The single was chosen through a poll conducted by the Esmas website. The song's main vocals are performed only by Maite Perroni, with the rest of the group doing the choruses. The single debuted at #17 on Billboard Latin Pop Songs and at position #42 on Billboard Hot Latin Songs. The single's 1980s-style music video was filmed on February 28, 2008 in Mexico City and was premiered on March 25, 2008 on Ritmoson Latino. The music video for "Empezar Desde Cero" was also directed by Esteban Madrazo, who had directed the video for "Inalcanzable", as well as the group's previous videos for "Ser O Parecer" and "Celestial".

On June 5, 2008, the last single from Empezar Desde Cero was announced, "Y No Puedo Olvidarte". The single did not have the support of a music video due to the sudden announcement of the group's disbandment. The song was performed live on July 17, 2008 during the 2008 Premios Juventud, being this the group's first and last time to perform the song at an awards show.

"No Digas Nada" was sent to Brazilian radio as well to serve as the album's fourth single, but the plan was eventually canceled.

=== Live performances ===
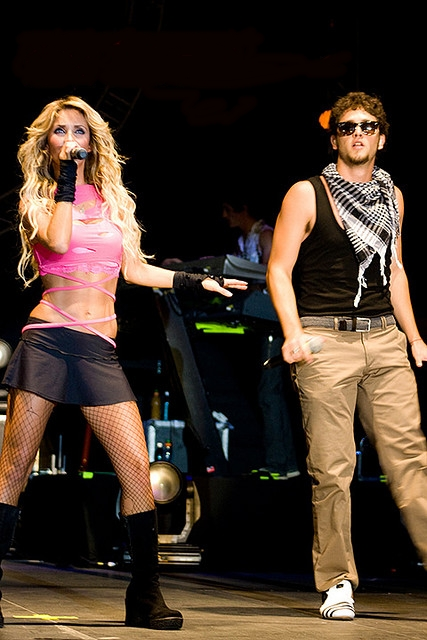
RBD band members Anahí and Christopher performing.

The promotion schedule for Empezar Desde Cero started on November 1, 2007, when RBD performed "Inalcanzable" for the first time at the 'Evento 40' in Mexico. Also in November 2007, the sextet presented the single on the Mexican TV show Mojoe. On December 12, 2007, the group appeared without Alfonso at the FOX Sports Awards, where they performed their single "Inalcanzable". On December 15, 2007, the group appeared on the 1st Annual Mi TRL Awards by MTV Tr3s, and also performed "Inalcanzable". Also in December 2007, the group appeared on the Mexican Teletón and performed singles from their previous albums as well as "Inalcanzable".

On January 26, 2008, RBD appeared on the 'Evento Oye' in Mexico City to again perform "Inalcanzable". On February 1, 2008, RBD appeared on the festivities prior to Super Bowl XLIII and performed their biggest hits and "Inalcanzable". On February 10 the group appeared on the Mexican show En Familia con Chabelo to perform both "Inalcanzable" and "Empezar Desde Cero". On February 24 the group appeared on Boomerang's Boom Box en Estudio to perform "Inalcanzable". Also in 2008, the group performed "Inalcanzable" on the Latin American musical variety TV show Noche de Estrellas, hosted by Mexican singer Yuri. On March 4, 2008, the group appeared on the American morning show ¡Despierta América! to perform "Empezar Desde Cero" and "Inalcanzable". That same day, the sextet appeared on Escándalo TV to again perform both singles. On March 20, 2008, RBD performed "Inalcanzable" on the US TV special Feliz 2008, hosted by Don Francisco. On March 25, 2008, the group appeared in Spain's TVE gala, where they again performed their successful single "Inalcanzable". In April 2008, RBD appeared again on the 'Evento 40' in Mexico, organized by Los 40 Principales, to perform "Inalcanzable", "Empezar Desde Cero" and their soon-to-be-released single, "Y No Puedo Olvidarte". On June 19, 2008, the band performed at the Exa TV concert in Mexico, but with the absences of Anahí, due to sickness, and Maite, due to filming Cuidado con el Ángel.

On July 13, 2008, RBD performed the album's last single, "Y No Puedo Olvidarte", on the second season of Ya es 1/2 Día en China. In this occasion the group again lacked the presence of Maite. On July 17, 2008, the group appeared on the 5th Annual Premios Juventud, where they gave a superhero-themed performance of "Y No Puedo Olvidarte". On this performance, Maite was also not present due to the filming of her telenovela Cuidado con el Ángel. On July 19, 2008, the band performed at the concert organized to celebrate the 50-year anniversary of Televisa in Monterrey, Mexico, where they sang "Y No Puedo Olvidarte" and "Inalcanzable". On July 24, 2008 the group is seen present at the Colombian TV show El Programa del Millón performing their last single, "Y No Puedo Olvidarte". Lastly, on October 25, 2008, RBD performed at the Exa TV concert in Mexico, which was broadcast live through the Mexican television network TeleHit, and there ended the promotion for Empezar Desde Cero and gave way to the start of their farewell tour.

=== Tours ===
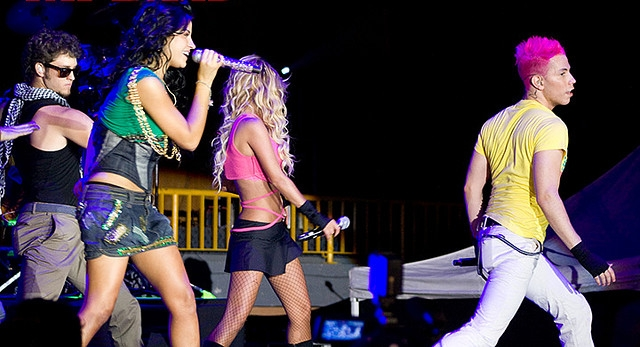
RBD during their Empezar Desde Cero Tour in Romania.

On February 15, 2008, RBD started their promotional tour for Empezar Desde Cero throughout the United States, visiting 17 cities in the country. On April 11, 2008, the Empezar Desde Cero Tour continued its trek throughout Latin America.

The tour received mostly positive reviews and enjoyed great commercial success. On April 19, 2008, the group held a concert in Bolivia, where they gathered more than 21,000 spectators. RBD returned to Brazil and sold out all tickets for the six concerts they held in the country, gathering 12,000 people in Rio de Janeiro, 7,000 people during three consecutive nights in São Paulo, and another 6,000 concertgoers in Manaus. In Brasília, the group held a concert in front of more than 500,000 people, breaking the record held there by The Rolling Stones, and there filmed their fifth concert DVD, Live in Brasília. In September, the group held a series of concerts in Slovenia, where tickets for their first two scheduled shows sold out in only 30 minutes, shattering ticket sale records in the country.

By mid-2008, American concert tour trade publication Pollstar announced the 100 most successful concert tours of the year up to that point; RBD reached #49 with 166,839 tickets sold from January 2008 up until June of the same year. By 2008's third trimester, Pollstar ranked RBD at #48 in the Top 100 concert tours for the sales of 301,015 tickets sold from January to September 2008. By the end of the year, the final numbers by Pollstar, which gathered data from January to December 2008, showed that RBD had a total of 367,346 concert tickets sold in 2008. RBD ranked in $4,400,000 just in North American ticket sales.

The tour arrived to its end on October 4, 2008, as the group announced its separation and gave way to their last concert tour, the Gira del Adiós World Tour. The farewell tour started on November 1, 2008 and had some of the songs from Empezar Desde Cero as part of its setlist. On November 29, 2008, in São Paulo, Brazil, the group's sixth and last concert DVD,Tournée do Adeus, was filmed. The DVD was released almost a year later on November 25, 2009, only in Brazil.

== Critical reception ==
Professional ratings
Review scores
Source	Rating
AllMusic	3.5/5 stars
Walmart.com	Mixed
Territorio da Música	2/5 stars

Empezar Desde Cero received mostly positive reviews, many critics describing the album as "mature" and praising the musical evolution of RBD's six members, especially the three females. Jason Birchmeier, from the music guide website AllMusic, described the album as not being "as much fun as [RBD's] earlier recordings, particularly their free-spirited debut album, the enjoyably frivolous Rebelde (2004)", but that "it's a welcome turn toward maturity for the teen pop stars", adding that "the result is a batch of songs with more thoughtful lyrical themes and more heartfelt performances from RBD". Birchmeier ended his review by stating that some of the songs on Empezar Desde Cero "might be RBD's best songs to date. They're so good, even RBD haters may be pleasantly surprised." Judy-Cantor Navas, director of online music service Rhapsody, did not rate the album, but stated that she believed that, similar to what Jason Birchmeier of AllMusic commented in his review, that the album "could signal the start of a more mature phase for RBD."

Leila Cobo, editorial reviewer for Walmart.com, commented that "Empezar Desde Cero is more of the same RBD, meaning, catchy, pretty pop that sticks very closely to the winning formula", and argued that "the bulk of Empezar is female driven (honestly, they are better singers and theirs are the best tracks)". Cobo finished her review by stating: "Be sure to stick with Empezar Desde Cero all the way to the end, and you'll be rewarded with "Extraña Sensación", a dance track that can work both for clubs and shows. Yes, RBD has kept to their catchy formula, but they're also trying to keep in touch with a fan base that is growing up and is now most definitely over 21."

By contrast, Rafael Sartori, from the Terra Networks-affiliated Territorio da Música website, gave the sextet a negative review, rating the album only 2 out of 5 stars. In his review, Sartori argued that "RBD's pop sound is simple and lazy, with arrangements and melodies destined for children", adding that "musically, [the album] doesn't represent any growth", while also stating that the album is only meant to be bought by the group's "fanatics".

== Commercial performance ==
Empezar Desde Cero garnered great success in North America. In the United States, the album reached #1 on both the Billboard Top Latin Albums and Billboard Latin Pop Albums charts, managing to rank for 22 and 25 weeks on the respective charts. On the Billboard 200, the album reached position #60 and ranked for 5 weeks on the chart. In 2008, Keith Caulfield of Billboard magazine revealed that, according to Nielsen Soundscan, the album managed to sell around 102,000 copies in the United States. In Mexico, the album debuted at #6 on the Mexican Albums Chart. The album ascended to #4, its peak position, on its fifth week on the chart, and managed to rank for 43 weeks on the chart's Top 100. Despite not reaching #1 in Mexico, the album was certified Platinum by the Asociación Mexicana de Productores de Fonogramas y Videogramas (AMPROFON) for the sales of 100,000 copies there. It was also certified 4×Platinum for sales of 400,000 units in pre-loaded format.

In Europe, the album also met with an acceptable reception. In Spain, the album managed to debut at #4 on the Spanish Albums Chart, being this the album's peak position, which it kept for two consecutive weeks. In Croatia, the album entered the Croatian International Albums Chart and reached position #30.

In Argentina, the album reached #17 on the monthly ranking published by CAPIF.

== Track listing ==
Empezar Desde Cero – Standard edition
No.	Title	Writer(s)	Producer(s)	Length
1.	"Empezar desde Cero"	Armando Ávila	Ávila	3:14
2.	"Y No Puedo Olvidarte"	Carlos Lara	Lara; Gustavo Borner^{[a]}	3:56
3.	"Inalcanzable"	Lara	Lara; Borner^{[a]}	4:14
4.	"No Digas Nada"	Ávila; Ángel Reyero	Ávila	3:20
5.	"El Mundo Detrás"	Dany Tomas; Sonia Molina	Lara; Borner^{[a]}	3:50
6.	"Hoy Que Te Vas"	Ávila; Reyero	Ávila	3:09
7.	"Llueve En Mi Corazón"	Mauricio L. Arriaga; J. Eduardo Murguía	Ávila	3:19
8.	"Fui La Niña"	Mads Krog; Mika Black; Ávila; Michkin Boyzo	Ávila	3:29
9.	"A La Orilla"	Lara; Pedro Damián	Lara; Borner^{[a]}	4:40
10.	"Amor Fugaz"	Michael Garvin; Winston Sela; Anthony Smith; Lara	Lara; Borner^{[a]}	3:41
11.	"Sueles Volver"	Christopher von Uckermann; Charly Rey; Güido Laris	Ávila	3:29
12.	"Si No Estás Aquí"	Alfonso Herrera; Laris	Ávila	3:26
13.	"Extraña Sensación"	Kay Hanley; Jonathan Mead; Lara	Lara; Borner^{[a]}	4:19
Total length:				48:06

Empezar Desde Cero – Enhanced/Argentina edition
No.	Title	Writer(s)	Producer(s)	Length
14.	"Ser O Parecer"	Ávila	Ávila	3:31
15.	"Solo Quédate en Silencio"	Arriaga	Lara; di Carlo	3:37
16.	"Nuestro Amor"	Memo Méndez Guiú; Emil "Billy" Méndez	Ávila	3:34
17.	"Sálvame"	DJ Kafka; di Carlo; Damián	Lara; di Carlo	3:43
18.	"Tu Amor"	Diane Warren		4:38
19.	"Rebelde"	DJ Kafka; di Carlo	Lara; di Carlo	3:32
Total length:				70:51

Notes

- ^{^[a]} signifies a co-producer
- "Fui La Niña" and "Extraña Sensación" are songs that were originally written in English, under the titles "Being a Good Girl" and "Let's See Where It Goes", respectively, but were never sold to an English-speaking artist. Therefore, they were sold to RBD and adapted into Spanish for the album.
- "Amor Fugaz" is the Spanish cover version of Sabrina Salerno's "Love Is All There Is", originally released on her album A Flower's Broken (1999).

== Empezar Desde Cero Fan Edition ==
Empezar Desde Cero Fan Edition

Studio album (reissue) by RBD
- Released: June 21, 2008
- Recorded: 2007–2008
- Studios: Igloo Music Studios (Burbank, California); Elth Studios (Mexico)
- Genres: Pop; dance-pop; pop rock
- Length: 58:41
- Language: Spanish
- Label: EMI
- Producers: Armando Ávila; Carlos Lara; Gustavo Borner (co-producer); Pedro Damián (exec.); Emilio Ávila (exec.)

RBD chronology
Empezar Desde Cero (2007)	Empezar Desde Cero Fan Edition (2008)	Best Of RBD (2008)

Empezar Desde Cero was reissued as Empezar Desde Cero (Fan Edition) on June 21, 2008, in Mexico. The re-release CD includes three bonus tracks in addition to the standard Empezar Desde Cero tracklist and a bonus DVD. The DVD features the music videos for the Empezar Desde Cero singles "Inalcanzable" and "Empezar Desde Cero", plus the making-of the videos and karaoke tracks. The album was nominated for a Latin Grammy Award for Best Pop Vocal Album, Duo or Group.

The new tracks are "Te Daría Todo" and "Tal Vez Mañana", written and performed by Dulce María and Maite Perroni, respectively. The third bonus track was the promotional single "Estar Bien", featuring Chilean pop rock group Kudai and Mexican actress and singer Eiza González, which was used to promote the Mexican health-awareness campaign "Elige Estar Bien".

Prior to the release of Empezar Desde Cero (Fan Edition), Maite Perroni's solo song, "Tal Vez Mañana", had leaked onto the Internet along with fellow RBD band member Christopher Uckermann's "Sueles Volver".

The cover art for Empezar Desde Cero (Fan Edition) only included the band's logo in the middle of a bright red circular ring, which was the symbol used to represent the Empezar Desde Cero era, over what seemed to be an old cardboard or crumpled-up paper background.

On June 19, 2008, the promotion schedule for Empezar Desde Cero (Fan Edition) went under way, as RBD performed at the Exa TV concert in Mexico, though with the absences of Anahí, due to sickness, and Maite Perroni, due to filming the telenovela Cuidado con el Ángel. The concert marked the first performance of the song "Te Daría Todo", handled solely by Dulce María.

On July 8, 2008, a press conference was organized for RBD to officially promote Empezar Desde Cero (Fan Edition), also without the presence of Perroni.

On July 19, 2008, the band performed at the concert organized to celebrate the 50-year anniversary of Televisa in Monterrey, Mexico, where they sang "Inalcanzable", "Y No Puedo Olvidarte" and "Te Daría Todo".

On July 27, 2008, the group performed "Estar Bien" together with Kudai at the finale of Colombian TV show El Programa del Millón.

=== Track listing ===
Empezar Desde Cero (Fan Edition)
No.	Title	Writer(s)	Producer(s)	Length
1.	"Empezar Desde Cero"	Ávila	Ávila	3:14
2.	"Y No Puedo Olvidarte"	Lara	Lara; Borner^{[a]}	3:56
3.	"Inalcanzable"	Lara	Lara; Borner^{[a]}	4:14
4.	"No Digas Nada"	Ávila; Reyero	Ávila	3:20
5.	"El Mundo Detrás"	Tomas; Molina	Lara; Borner^{[a]}	3:50
6.	"Hoy Que Te Vas"	Ávila; Reyero	Ávila	3:09
7.	"Llueve En Mi Corazón"	Arriaga; Murguía	Ávila	3:19
8.	"Fui La Niña"	Krog; Black; Ávila; Boyzo	Ávila	3:29
9.	"A La Orilla"	Lara; Damián	Lara; Borner^{[a]}	4:40
10.	"Amor Fugaz"	Garvin; Sela; Smith; Lara	Lara; Borner^{[a]}	3:41
11.	"Sueles Volver"	Uckermann; Rey; Laris	Ávila	3:29
12.	"Si No Estás Aquí"	Herrera; Laris	Ávila	3:26
13.	"Extraña Sensación"	Hanley; Mead; Lara	Lara; Borner^{[a]}	4:19
14.	"Tal Vez Mañana"	Maite Perroni; Orlando Calzada; Laris	Lara; Borner^{[a]}	3:36
15.	"Te Daría Todo"	Dulce María; Gonzalo Schroeder	Ávila	3:39
16.	"Estar Bien" (featuring Kudai and Eiza González)	Lara; Damián	Lara	3:13
Total length:				58:41

Empezar Desde Cero (Fan Edition) – bonus DVD
No.	Title	Length
1.	"Inalcanzable" (Music video)	4:14
2.	"Empezar Desde Cero" (Music video)	3:15
3.	"Inalcanzable" (Making of)	4:29
4.	"Empezar Desde Cero" (Making of)	4:13
5.	"Inalcanzable" (Karaoke)	4:19
6.	"Empezar Desde Cero" (Karaoke)	3:22
7.	"Y No Puedo Olvidarte" (Karaoke)	3:59
Total length:		27:51

Notes

- ^{^[a]} signifies a co-producer
- "Amor Fugaz" is the Spanish cover version of Sabrina Salerno's "Love Is All There Is", originally released on Sabrina's album A Flower's Broken (1999).

== Personnel ==
Credits adapted from the album's liner notes.

Recording locations

- Elth Studios (Mexico)
- Igloo Music Studios (Burbank, California)

Mixing locations

- Igloo Music Studios (Burbank, California)
- Cosmos Studios (Mexico)

Vocals

- RBD – main vocals, choruses
- Kudai – featured vocals, choruses Empezar Desde Cero (Fan Edition), track "Estar Bien"
- Eiza González – featured vocals, choruses Empezar Desde Cero (Fan Edition), track "Estar Bien"
- Armando Ávila – choruses
- Facundo Monty – choruses
- Giza Vatky – choruses

Musicians

- Armando Ávila – acoustic guitar, bass, electric guitar, keyboards, mandolin
- Jimmy Johnson – bass
- Greg Bissonette – drums
- Enrique "Bugs" González – drums
- Javo González – guitars
- Martín Pérez – guitar
- Michael Thompson – guitars
- Ruy Folguera – keyboards
- Jon Gilutin – keyboards
- Czech National Symphony Orchestra – string section
- Lee Thornburg – trumpet
- Novi Novog – viola

Production

- Fernando Grediaga – A&R
- Camilo Lara – A&R
- Angélica Pérez Allende – A&R coordination
- Rafa Arcaute – arrangements
- Armando Ávila – arrangements, direction, mixing, programming, producer, vocal direction, vocal recording
- Gustavo Borner – arrangements, co-producer, mastering, mixing, recording engineer
- Juan Carlos Moguel – arrangements, mixing, vocal recording
- Ruy Folguera – arrangements
- Pico Adworks – art direction, graphic design
- Luis Luisillo Miguel – associate producer
- Carlos Lara – concept, direction, producer, vocal direction
- Ricardo Gascón – DVD authoring Empezar Desde Cero (Fan Edition)
- Carolina Palomo – coordinator
- Emilio Ávila – executive producer
- Pedro Damián – executive producer
- Fernanda Roel – photography
- Rotger Ros – production assistant
- Daniel Borner – production coordinator
- Jorge González Montaut – production coordinator
- Justin Moshkevich – recording assistant
- Nacho Segura – recording assistant
- Joseph "Joe" Greco – recording engineer
- Michkin Boyzo – strings conductor
- Pepe Ortega – strings recording
- Carlos Valdez – vocal direction

== Awards and nominations ==
Year	Ceremony	Award	Result
2008	Latin Grammy Awards	Best Pop Album By A Duo Or Group With Vocals	Nominated
2008	Billboard Latin Music Awards	Latin Pop Album of the Year, Duo or Group	Nominated
2008	Premios Juventud	CD to Die For	Nominated
2008	Orgullosamente Latino Awards	Album of the Year	Nominated
2009	Premios Lo Nuestro	Latin Pop Album of the Year	Nominated

== Charts and certifications ==
=== Weekly charts ===
Chart	Peak Position
Argentine Albums Chart	1
Colombian Albums Chart	1
Croatian Albums Chart	30
Mexican Albums Chart	4
Slovenian Albums (IFPI)	1
Spanish Albums Chart	4
US Billboard 200	60
US Billboard Top Latin Albums	1
US Billboard Latin Pop Albums	1
Venezuelan Albums Chart	1

=== Monthly charts ===
Chart	Peak Position
Argentine Albums Chart	17

=== Year-end charts ===
Charts (2008)	Peak Position
US Billboard Top Latin Albums	16
US Billboard Latin Pop Albums	9

== Certifications ==
Region	Certification	Certified units/sales
Mexico (AMPROFON)	Platinum	100,000^{^}
Mexico (AMPROFON) Pre-loaded	4× Platinum	400,000^{^}
^{^} Shipments figures based on certification alone.

== Release history ==
=== Empezar Desde Cero ===
Region	Date	Format	Label
Mexico	November 20, 2007	CD, digital download	EMI
United States	November 20, 2007	CD, digital download	EMI
Colombia	November 20, 2007	CD, digital download	EMI
Venezuela	November 20, 2007	CD, digital download	EMI
Spain	November 20, 2007	CD, digital download	EMI
Brazil	November 20, 2007	CD, digital download	EMI
Ecuador	November 20, 2007	CD, digital download	EMI
Chile	November 20, 2007	CD, digital download	EMI
Argentina	February 18, 2008	CD, digital download	EMI
Portugal	August 4, 2008	CD, digital download	EMI

=== Empezar Desde Cero (Fan Edition) ===
Region	Date	Format	Label
Mexico	June 21, 2008	CD + DVD, digital download	EMI
United States	June 21, 2008	CD + DVD, digital download	EMI
Colombia	June 21, 2008	CD + DVD, digital download	EMI
Venezuela	June 21, 2008	CD + DVD, digital download	EMI
Brazil	June 21, 2008	CD + DVD, digital download	EMI
Argentina	June 21, 2008	CD + DVD, digital download	EMI
Ecuador	June 21, 2008	CD + DVD, digital download	EMI
Chile	June 21, 2008	CD + DVD, digital download	EMI
Spain	July 1, 2008	CD + DVD, digital download	EMI
