= Live in Rio (RBD video) =

Live In Rio

Live album by RBD
- Released: February 2, 2007
- Recorded: October 8, 2006
- Venue: Maracanã Stadium, Rio de Janeiro, Brazil
- Genre: Latin pop
- Length: 119 minutes
- Language: Spanish; Portuguese
- Label: EMI
- Producer: Pedro Damián (exec.)

RBD chronology
¿Que Hay Detrás de RBD? (2006)	Live In Rio (2007)	RBD: La Familia (2007)

Live In Rio is the third live material by Mexican pop group RBD. The video was recorded on October 8, 2006, before an audience of 100,000 people at the Maracanã Stadium in Rio de Janeiro, Brazil on the group's Tour Brasil 2006.

RBD made history in this concert by becoming the first Spanish language act to sell out the Maracanã, overshadowing in the process the turnouts for acts such as Luis Miguel or Guns N' Roses with 50.000. This particular concert also saw the first performance of "Ser O Parecer", RBD's lead single off of their then-upcoming third studio album, Celestial.

The DVD included extra features such as a documentary following RBD's first Brazilian concert tour, in which the group performed 13 sold-out concerts in 12 cities; the main being Manaus, Belém, Belo Horizonte, Brasília, Porto Alegre (the only city in which they played two concerts), São Paulo, and finishing in Rio de Janeiro, where the DVD was filmed. Other special features on the DVD include a behind-the-scenes documentary hosted by a teenage fan, showing other fans in line for the concert, as well as the tour's crew. A photo gallery with pictures of fans dressed as "rebeldes", taken during the line for the concert, was also included.

An official 2-CD promotional live album was made in Mexico, but was not released for sale, just distributed to radio stations. In Brazil, a special limited edition of the album was distributed to subscribers of cable TV channel Boomerang (in which RBD's originating telenovela, Rebelde, was shown) with a cardboard cover imitating the school uniform the characters wore in the telenovela.

On July 21, 2023, the live audio was released through streaming platforms, after being one of the two DVDs not re-released with the rest of the band's music in September 2020, the other being Tournée do Adeus.

== Background and release ==
"You have no idea what an amazing concert, with great musicians, production, staff, lighting, sound, the band, everything is impressive."

—Anahí talking about the live concert DVD recorded at the Maracanã Stadium.

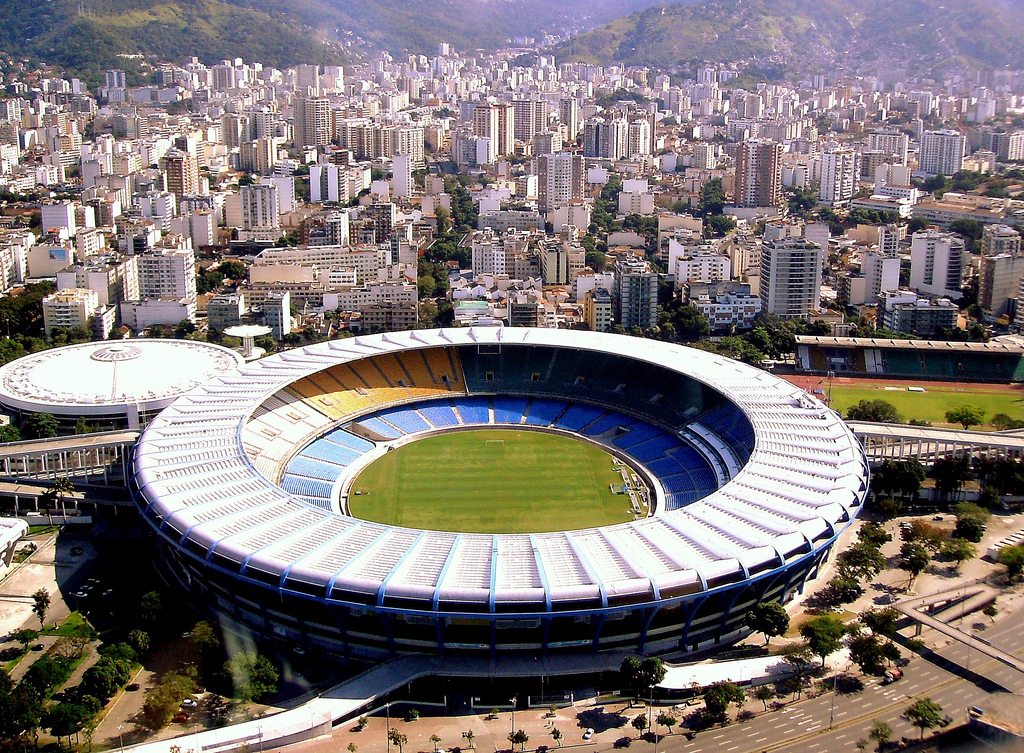
The Maracanã Stadium, where the concert was recorded

In 2006, RBD band member Anahí confirmed the recording of the live concert DVD at the Maracanã Stadium, stating: "Imagine our excitement, RBD will record their new live album in the Maracanã Stadium. I think it is a gift for the people who truly love us, plus I have so much faith in that concert and very soon you will be able to see it (in DVD) so you can see what happened."

The DVD was filmed on October 8, 2006, before a crowd of more than 50,000 people in Rio de Janeiro, Brazil. The filmed concert was part of the tour the band made throughout the country, titled Tour Brasil 2006, which reached 13 Brazilian cities. The concert was filmed by 27 cameras recording simultaneously, with an additional two floating overhead by helicopter.

The concert's setlist consisted of songs from RBD's first two studio albums, Rebelde and Nuestro Amor, while also having the premiere of "Ser O Parecer", the lead single from the group's then upcoming album, Celestial. RBD became the first Mexican group to perform at the Maracanã Stadium and to go on tour through various Brazilian cities. The live concert DVD was released on February 2, 2007, in Brazil and on March 20, 2007, in the United States and Mexico.

RBD band member Alfonso Herrera recommended the release, stating: "It's a wonderful DVD, I had the opportunity to sneak a few peaks, it's impressive, from the venue to how they made it and the show is incredible, the fireworks, it's awe-inspiring." Fellow group member Maite Perroni defined the concert as one full of passion, love, and talked about the warm welcome of the people, stating: "We ended dancing samba, we were very happy with all the people. The truth is that there has been many, many experiences like that one, it was a very beautiful moment."

== Track listing ==
1. "Abertura" (Intro) – 0:51
2. "Rebelde" – 3:32
3. "Santa No Soy" – 3:07
4. "Así Soy Yo" – 3:00
5. "Feliz Cumpleaños" – 3:32
6. "Enséñame" – 3:36
7. "Qué Fue Del Amor" (Outro "O Que Houve Com O Amor?") – 3:31
8. "Cuando El Amor Se Acaba" – 3:53
9. "Una Canción" – 3:39
10. "Este Corazón" –3:28
11. "Solo Para Ti" – 4:53
12. "Me Voy" – 3:35
13. "Sálvame" (mashup with "Salva-me") – 9:00
14. "Tenerte Y Quererte" (mashup with "Querer-te") – 3:42
15. "Apresentacão da Banda" (Band Introduction) – 8:45
16. "No Pares" – 4:37
17. "A Tu Lado" – 6:34
18. "Fuera" (verse 1 "Fora") – 3:37
19. "Solo Quédate En Silencio" (performed as "Fique Em Silêncio" with only Anahí's lines in Spanish) – 3:43
20. "Qué Hay Detrás" – 4:34
21. "Un Poco De Tu Amor" (verse 1 "Um Pouco Desse Amor") – 4:46
22. "Aún Hay Algo" – 4:19
23. "Tras De Mí" – 4:28
24. "Ser O Parecer" – 3:39
25. "Nuestro Amor" (performed as "Nosso Amor" with only Christopher, (Note: Fans that attended the concert have confirmed that Uckermann actually sang in Spanish, in contrast to the DVD's Portuguese audio, most likely re-recorded to keep it in the same language as much as possible, despite Christian and Anahí's verses remaining in Spanish.) Anahí and Christian's verse in Spanish) – 3:54
26. "Rebelde" (Portuguese rock version) – 3:44
27. "Samba da Mocidade: O Grande Circo Místico/Citacão da Música: Sou Brasileiro" – 8:48

Bonus material

- RBD News (Behind the scenes/Making of the DVD) – 19:52
- Eu Sou RBD (Photo Gallery) – 0:27
- Por Trás do Palco (Documentary) – 14:52

== Live album ==
Live in Rio

Live album by RBD
- Released: 2007 (promo)
- Recorded: October 8, 2006
- Venue: Maracanã Stadium, Rio de Janeiro, Brazil
- Genre: Latin pop
- Length: 91:12
- Language: Spanish; Portuguese
- Label: EMI

RBD chronology
Rebels (2006)	Live in Rio (2007)	RBD: La Familia (2007)

Live in Rio is also an official two-CD live album of the recorded song performances of the concert held at the Maracanã Stadium in Rio de Janeiro, Brazil on October 8, 2006.

The double-disc album's pressing was made in Mexico, but was not released for sale, just distributed to radio stations in early 2007. In Brazil, a special limited edition of the album was distributed to subscribers of cable TV channel Boomerang (in which RBD's originating telenovela, Rebelde, was shown) with a cardboard cover imitating the school uniform the characters wore in the telenovela. In 2020 the album was officially released in CD in Mexico and digitally in the world.

The promotional release actually contained 12 live songs on each of the two discs. The album omitted the live concert audio of all intros, medleys, musical interludes, the Christopher on drums section, and the band introduction.

== Track listing ==
Live in Rio – [CD 1]
No.	Title	Writer(s)	Length
1.	"Rebelde"	DJ Kafka; Max di Carlo	3:35
2.	"Santa No Soy"	La Carr	3:11
3.	"Así Soy Yo"	Fernando Rojo	3:04
4.	"Feliz Cumpleaños"	Jade Ell; Mats Hedström	2:57
5.	"Enséñame"	Javier Calderón	3:42
6.	"Qué Fue Del Amor" (outro from "O Que Houve Com O Amor")	Armando Ávila	3:31
7.	"Cuando El Amor Se Acaba"	José Manuel Pérez Marino	3:37
8.	"Una Canción"	José Roberto Matera; CJ Turbay Daccarett	3:42
9.	"Este Corazón"	Ávila	3:30
10.	"Solo Para Ti"	Mario Sandoval	4:07
11.	"Me Voy"	Kara DioGuardi	3:34
12.	"Sálvame" (mashup with "Salva-me")	DJ Kafka; di Carlo; Pedro Damián	3:46
Total length:			42:17

Live in Rio – [CD 2]
No.	Title	Writer(s)	Length
1.	"Tenerte y Quererte" (mashup with "Querer-te")	Roche; Powers	3:46
2.	"No Pares"	Thomas	4:37
3.	"A Tu Lado"	Carlos Lara; Karen Sokoloff	3:04
4.	"Fuera" (verse 1 "Fora")	Mauricio Arriaga	3:43
5.	"Solo Quédate En Silencio" (performed as "Fique em Silencio", with only Anahí's verses in Spanish)	Arriaga	3:47
6.	"Qué Hay Detrás"	Lara; Sokoloff	3:50
7.	"Un Poco de Tu Amor" (verse 1 "Um Pouco Desse Amor")	DJ Kafka; di Carlo	4:46
8.	"Aún Hay Algo"	Lara; Sokoloff	3:41
9.	"Tras de Mí"	Lara; Sokoloff; Damián	4:31
10.	"Ser O Parecer"	Ávila	3:26
11.	"Nuestro Amor" (performed as "Nosso Amor", with only Anahí and Christian's verses in Spanish)	Memo Méndez Guiú; Emil "Billy" Méndez	3:56
12.	"Rebelde" (Portuguese rock version)	DJ Kafka; di Carlo; Cláudio Rabello	4:47
Total length:			48:55

== Personnel ==
Credits adapted from the DVD's liner notes.

Recorded live at

- Maracanã Stadium (Rio de Janeiro, Brazil)

Performance credits

- RBD – main artist

Musicians

- Güido Laris – bass, classical guitar, musical director, vocal direction
- Gonzalo Velázquez – classical guitar, guitar
- Carlos María "Charly" Rey – background vocals, classical guitar, guitar
- Mauricio Soto "Bicho" – drums, percussion
- Luis Emilio Arreaza "Catire" – drums, percussion
- Eduardo "Eddy" Tellez – keyboards

Production

- Luis Luisillo Miguel – associate producer
- Luciane Ribeiro - design, visual programming
- Paulo Pelá - design, visual programming
- Santiago Ferraz – DVD authoring, principal photography
- Pedro Damián – executive producer
- Marcos Hermes – graphic design, photography
- Adriana Trigona – graphic design
- Carolina Palomo Ramos – production coordinator

== Charts ==
=== Weekly charts (2007) ===
Country	Provider	Peak position	Certification	Sales	Notes
Spain	PROMUSICAE	1	2× Platinum	50,000	19 weeks at number 1
Mexico	AMPROFON	1	Platinum	20,000	2 weeks at number 1
Argentina	CAPIF	6			

=== Year-end charts (2007) ===
Charts	Peak Position
Brazil ABPD TOP 20 DVD – 2007	14
Spain PROMUSICAE - TOP 10 DVD MUSICAL 2007	4

== Release information ==
The DVD had several release dates, though the official release date was February 2, 2007 in Brazil. According to Amazon.com, the DVD had a US release on March 20, 2007. In Spain, the DVD spent 19 weeks at number one and was the fourth most sold music DVD in Spain in 2007. In the United States, the DVD was released before March 20 in some retailers, such as Wal-Mart.

Region	Release date	Format	Label
Brazil	February 2, 2007	DVD, digital download	EMI
United States	March 20, 2007	DVD, digital download	EMI
Mexico	March 20, 2007	DVD, digital download	EMI
