= RBD: La Familia (album) =

2007 RBD album

Soundtrack album by RBD
- Released: March 14, 2007
- Genre: Pop; pop rock
- Length: 35:01
- Language: Spanish; Portuguese; English
- Label: EMI
- Producer: Pedro Damián (exec.)

RBD chronology
Live in Rio (2007)	RBD: La Familia (2007)	Celestial (Fan Edition) (2007)

Singles from RBD: La Familia
- 1. "Quiero Poder" Released: March 14, 2007

RBD: La Familia (English: RBD: The Family) is the first soundtrack album by Mexican pop band RBD. The soundtrack was made to promote the group's 2007 sitcom RBD: La Familia. It was released exclusively by the Mexican television network SKY on March 14, 2007. The compilation includes the newly recorded track "Quiero Poder," which was co-written by RBD band member Dulce María and Gonzalo Schroeder, two acoustic songs, one live track and 6 songs from the group's previous albums. The DVD-side of the soundtrack also included a behind-the-scenes documentary of the recording of "Quiero Poder."

== Track listing ==
La Familia – CD side
No.	Title	Writer(s)	Length
1.	"Quiero Poder"	Armando Ávila; Dulce María; Gonzalo Schroeder	2:46
2.	"Rebelde"	Carlos Lara; Max di Carlo	3:32
3.	"Ensina-Me"	Javier Calderón; Cláudio Rabello	3:38
4.	"Qué Hay Detrás" (Acoustic version)	Lara; Karen Sokoloff	3:47
5.	"Así Soy Yo"	Fernando Rojo	3:08
6.	"Qué Fue Del Amor"	Armando Ávila	3:44
7.	"Futuro Ex-Novio"	Sean & Dame; Steve Smith; Anthony Anderson; Michkin Boyzo	2:58
8.	"Save Me"	DJ Kafka; di Carlo; Pedro Damián	3:57
9.	"Este Corazón" (Acoustic version)	Ávila	3:50
10.	"Una Canción" (Live)	José Roberto Matera; CJ Turbay Daccarett	3:41
Total length:			35:01

La Familia – DVD side
No.	Title	Length
1.	"Behind the Scenes of recording "Quiero Poder"" (Video)	8:00
