= Gone (Kelly Clarkson song) =

2004 song by Kelly Clarkson

Song by Kelly Clarkson

from the album Breakaway
- Recorded: 2004
- Studio: Henson Recording Studios (Los Angeles, CA)
- Genre: Pop rock
- Length: 3:25
- Label: RCA
- Songwriters: Kara DioGuardi; John Shanks
- Producer: John Shanks

"Gone" is a song by American recording artist Kelly Clarkson, from her second studio album, Breakaway (2004). Written by Kara DioGuardi and co-written and produced by John Shanks, "Gone" is a pop song about a woman leaving her lover in search for a better relationship. "Gone" was well received by music critics, though it garnered comparisons with similarly titled "Since U Been Gone". Two years after Breakaway's release, "Gone" charted in the Billboard Pop 100 chart at number 77. Clarkson has also performed the song in concert tours, primarily during the Breakaway World Tour from 2005 to 2006 and the Stronger Tour in 2012.

== Background and composition ==
"Gone" was written by Kara DioGuardi and John Shanks, with Shanks also serving as the song's producer. It was one of the two collaborations by DioGuardi and Shanks for Kelly Clarkson's second studio album, Breakaway, along with "You Found Me". Written by in the key of D minor, "Gone" is a pop rock song with a length of 3 minutes and 25 seconds. Clarkson describes it as "feisty".

== Critical response ==
"Gone" received generally positive reviews from critics, who compared the song to "Since U Been Gone", which is also a track from Breakaway. Charles Merwin of Stylus Magazine wrote that "Gone" "sounds like as though it's grafted the most tame version of Akufen, Christina Aguilera, and latin guitar on top of one another into a hugely satisfying pop masterpiece". The music site, Popservations.com, included it as one of "Clarkson's Best Non-Singles", writing that the song "has all the makings of another Clarkson smash, a solid pop-rock production (the stop-start guitar, the filtered drum loop as the chorus kicks in) in which she pointedly tells some loser ex that she's now 'Miss Independent'."

== Credits and personnel ==
Credits adapted from the Breakaway liner notes.

Recording

- Recorded at Henson Recording Studios, Hollywood, California

Personnel

- Lead Vocals – Kelly Clarkson
- Production, Guitar, Keyboards – John Shanks
- Drums – Jeff Rothschild
- Bass – John Shanks, Paul Bushnell
- Mixing, Recording – John Shanks, Jeff Rothschild
- Pro-Tools engineering – John Hanes
- Assistance – Glenn Pittman
- Additional Engineering – Mark Valentine, Lars Fox
- Recording – Ryan Tedder, Craig Durrance
- Production coordination – Shari Sutclihe
- Songwriting – Kara DioGuardi, John Shanks

== Charts ==
Chart (2006)	Peak position
US Pop 100 (Billboard)	77
US Pop 100 Airplay (Billboard)	41

== RBD versions ==
"Me Voy"
- Live version cover art

Song by RBD

from the album Nuestro Amor and We Are RBD
- Language: Spanish; English
- English title: "I'm Leaving"
- Genre: Latin pop; Pop rock
- Length: 3:32 (Spanish); 3:15 (English)
- Label: EMI
- Songwriters: Kara DioGuardi; John Shanks; Mauri Stern (Spa. ver.)
- Producers: Max Di Carlo; Carlos Lara Galvan

Alternative cover
- English version cover art

Music video
- "Me Voy (Audio)" on YouTube

Mexican pop band RBD recorded a Spanish cover version of the song titled "Me Voy", for their second studio album, Nuestro Amor (2005). The song was adapted to Spanish by songwriter Mauri Stern. They would later re-record the original English version for the Japanese edition of their first English-language studio album Rebels (2006). The Spanish version of the track was included in the setlist of all their tours starting from 2006 (excluding the first leg of their Tour Generación RBD, when they were promoting their first album in 2005), and is featured on the live CDs and DVDs Live in Hollywood, Live in Rio, Live in Brasília, and Tournée do Adeus. Despite being performed during filming of their Hecho en España CD/DVD, the track, alongside "Fuera" and "Tal Vez Mañana", was not included on the project's releases. The song was performed as part of the "Medley Eras" segment of the group's 2023 reunion Soy Rebelde Tour.

=== Formats ===
• Digital download – Spanish version

1. "Me Voy" – 3:32

• Digital download – English version

1. "Gone" – 3:15

=== Credits and personnel ===
- Alfonso Herrera – vocals (Note: Only during live performances)
- Anahí – vocals
- Christian Chávez – chorus vocals
- Christopher von Uckermann – vocals
- Dulce María – vocals
- Maite Perroni – vocals
- Kara DioGuardi – songwriter
- John Shanks – songwriter
- Mauri Stern – songwriter (Spanish adaptation)
- Max Di Carlo – producer
- Carlos Lara – producer

=== Charts ===
Chart (2006)	Peak position
Honduras	2
