= Inalcanzable (song) =

Single by RBD

from the album Empezar Desde Cero
- Language: Spanish
- English title: "Unattainable"
- Released: 8 October 2007
- Recorded: 2007
- Studio: Igloo Music (Burbank, California)
- Genre: Ballad; Latin pop
- Length: 4:15
- Label: EMI
- Songwriter: Carlos Lara
- Producers: Carlos Lara; Gustavo Borner (co-producer); Pedro Damián (exec.)

RBD singles chronology
| "Bésame Sin Miedo" (2007) | "Inalcanzable" (2007) | "Empezar Desde Cero" (2008) |

Alternative covers
- 2021 Live version

Music video
- "Inalcanzable" on YouTube

"Inalcanzable" is a song by Mexican pop group RBD. Written by Carlos Lara and co-produced with Pedro Damián, it was released as the lead single for the group's fourth Spanish-language studio album, Empezar Desde Cero (2007). The melancholic ballad combines piano with acoustic guitars and some wind instruments in its production.

RBD confirmed the release of the single at the "Worldwide RBD Day" press conference held on October 4, 2007. The song was released to radio stations and made available as a digital download on October 8. The song was well received by music critics and garnered award nominations on Premios Lo Nuestro, Premios Orgullosamente Latino and Premios Juventud. The song's accompanying music video went on to win an Orgullosamente Latino Award in 2008 in the category for 'Latin Music Video of the Year'. The song's official remix, which features reggaeton duo Jowell & Randy and reggaeton solo artist De La Ghetto, also won an award, in the category 'The Perfect Combo' at the 2008 Premios Juventud.

The single peaked at #6 on the US Billboard Hot Latin Songs chart, becoming the group's last top-ten hit on the ranking, but reached #2 on the US Billboard Latin Pop Songs subchart.

== Music video ==
The music video for "Inalcanzable" was directed by previous RBD collaborator Esteban Madrazo. The video was filmed on November 7, 2007 over a course of 20 hours in an old house in the Colonia San Rafael of Mexico City. The video premiered on December 5, 2007 on the Ritmoson Latino TV channel, but had leaked onto the Internet the day before. The video features multiple special effects and shows each of the members of RBD going through a tough time, when suddenly some of their fans come to give them courage and support. The music video won the award for 'Latin Music Video of the Year' at the 2008 Orgullosamente Latino Awards.

== Live performances ==
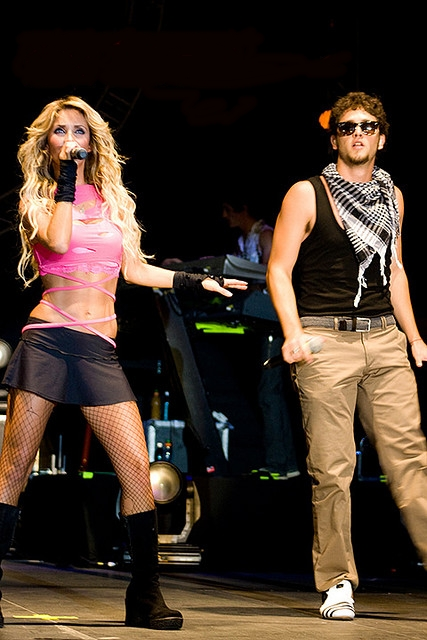
RBD band members Anahí and Christopher performing.

RBD performed "Inalcanzable" for the first time at the 'Evento 40' in Mexico on November 1, 2007. Also in November 2007, the sextet presented the single on the Mexican TV show Mojoe. On December 12, 2007, the group appeared without band member Alfonso Herrera at the FOX Sports Awards, where they performed the single. On December 15, the group appeared on the 1st Annual Mi TRL Awards by MTV Tr3s, and also performed "Inalcanzable". Also in December 2007, the group appeared on the Mexican Teletón and performed the single.

On January 26, 2008, RBD appeared at the 'Evento Oye' in Mexico City to again perform "Inalcanzable". On February 1, 2008, RBD appeared on the festivities prior to Super Bowl XLIII and performed the hit. On February 10, the group appeared on the Mexican show En Familia con Chabelo to again perform "Inalcanzable". On February 24, the group performed the song on Latin American Boomerang's Boom Box en Estudio. Also in 2008, the group performed "Inalcanzable" on the Latin American musical variety TV show Noche de Estrellas, hosted by Mexican singer Yuri. On March 4, 2008, the group performed the song on the American morning show ¡Despierta América!. That same day, the sextet appeared on Escándalo TV to again perform the single. On March 20, RBD performed "Inalcanzable" on the US TV special Feliz 2008, hosted by Don Francisco. On March 25, the group appeared in Spain's TVE gala, where they again performed the successful single. In April 2008, RBD appeared again on the 'Evento 40' in Mexico, organized by Los 40 Principales, to again perform "Inalcanzable". On June 19, 2008, the band performed the song again at the Exa TV concert in Mexico, but with the absences of Anahí, due to sickness, and Maite Perroni, due to filming Cuidado con el Ángel.

== Critical reception ==
"Inalcanzable" was generally well received by music critics. Judy-Cantor Navas, director of online music service Rhapsody, complimented the song for being a "beautiful and sweet collective ballad." Cantor-Navas also commented that the new music "could signal the start of a more mature phase for RBD".

== Chart performance ==
In the United States, "Inalcanzable" debuted at number thirty-six on the Billboard Latin Pop Songs airplay chart on November 4, 2007. The song made a big impact on the same chart the next issue by moving from #36 to #9, being bulleted as the song that increased the most in plays that week, and eventually peaked at #2. "Inalcanzable" became RBD's fifth top 10 hit on the US Billboard Hot Latin Songs chart, peaking at number 6 in its sixth week charting.

== Personnel ==
Recording location

- Igloo Music Studios (Burbank, California)

Mixing location

- Igloo Music Studios (Burbank, California)

Vocals

- Alfonso Herrera – vocals
- Anahí – vocals
- Christian Chávez – vocals
- Christopher von Uckermann – vocals (Note: Live performances only)
- Dulce María – vocals
- Lynda Thomas – harmony, chorus vocals (uncredited)
- Maite Perroni – vocals

Production

- Gustavo Borner – co-producer, mastering, mixing
- Carlos Lara – direction, producer, vocal direction
- Pedro Damián – executive producer
- Daniel Borner – production coordinator
- Justin Moshkevich – recording assistant

== Awards and nominations ==
| Year | Ceremony | Award | Result |
|---|---|---|---|
| 2008 | Premios Juventud | The Perfect Combo (Remix featuring Jowell & Randy and De La Ghetto) | Won |
| 2008 | Premios Juventud | Best Ballad | Nominated |
| 2008 | Premios Juventud | My Favorite Video | Nominated |
| 2008 | Orgullosamente Latino Awards | Latin Song of the Year | Nominated |
| 2008 | Orgullosamente Latino Awards | Latin Music Video of the Year | Won |

== Charts ==
| Charts (2007) | Peak position |
|---|---|
| Romania (Airplay 100) | 2 |
| US Hot Latin Songs (Billboard) | 6 |
| US Latin Pop Airplay (Billboard) | 2 |

== Release history ==
| Date | Format | Label |
|---|---|---|
| October 8, 2007 | CD single, digital download | EMI |
