= Orgullosamente Latino Award =

The Orgullosamente Latino Awards are accolades first awarded in 2004 for the best in Latin music. They were created by Alexis Núñes Oliva, Executive Producer of Ritmoson Latino, the Mexico-based music television channel through which the awards are broadcast each year.

The awards are given to albums with previously unreleased material, inside the January 1 and December 31 dates of each year. For the special "Latin Trajectory of the Year" award, the nominees must have at least 20 years of career within the musical scene. The Orgullosamente Latino awards have the main difference that is a fan, instead of a celebrity, who gives the award to the winning artist.

There exist seven categories awarded each year:

- Latin Trajectory of the Year
- Male Latin Soloist of the Year
- Female Latin Soloist of the Year
- Latin Group of the Year
- Latin Album of the Year
- Latin Song of the Year
- Latin Music Video of the Year.

== See also ==
Premios Orgullosamente Latino on Spanish Wikipedia for more information about nominees and winners
