= Empezar Desde Cero (song) =

Single by RBD

from the album Empezar Desde Cero
- Language: Spanish
- English title: "Starting From Zero"
- Released: 29 January 2008
- Recorded: 2007
- Genre: Pop rock, dance-pop
- Length: 3:16
- Label: EMI; Capitol Records
- Songwriter: Armando Ávila
- Producer: Armando Ávila

RBD singles chronology
"Inalcanzable" (2007)	"Empezar Desde Cero" (2008)	"Y No Puedo Olvidarte" (2008)

Alternative covers
- 2021 Live version

Music video
- "Empezar Desde Cero" on YouTube

"Empezar Desde Cero" is a song recorded by Mexican pop group RBD for their fourth Spanish studio album of the same name (2007). It was released as the second single from the album. On January 29, 2008, Esmas confirmed the release of the song, after it won the official next single poll on the group's official website with 40% of the votes, leaving "Y No Puedo Olvidarte" behind with 30% of the votes.

"Empezar Desde Cero" is only sung by Maite Perroni. It is the band's fourth solo-single (third in Spanish) after "Sálvame" (Spanish, sung by Anahí), "No Pares" (Spanish, sung by Dulce María) and "Tu Amor" (English, sung by Christian Chávez).

== Music video ==
The video was shot on February 28, 2008, and premiered a month later on March 25 through RBD's Gyggs community.

The music video is based on the 70's. It shows Maite waking up, taking a bath, putting clothing on, whereafter she meets her friends (Dulce and Anahí). So on, to the subway, she finds Christopher and Alfonso to wall up Maite in order for her to quickly change clothes.

A new scene starts at the end of the chorus, showing Maite and Christian flirting, and then, Dulce María, Anahí and Maite tanning at the beach, and Christopher and Alfonso walking on the beach. It cuts to a scene where Maite is singing as a pop diva, dressed in a black jacket, it cuts again, showing the entire group having fun together, and then the day ends.

A new day starts, showing Maite in her routine, but now, meeting all her friends together and singing with them (Dulce and Christopher talking inside a phone booth). The video ends with everyone singing together over drinks.

== Charts ==
Chart (2008)	Peak position
Nicaragua (EFE)	7
Panama (EFE)	1
US Hot Latin Songs (Billboard)	42
US Latin Pop Airplay (Billboard)	17
Venezuela (Record Report)	1
Venezuela Pop Rock (Record Report)	2

== Credits and personnel ==
- Alfonso Herrera – chorus vocals (Note: Only in live performances)
- Anahí – ad-lib vocals, chorus vocals
- Armando Ávila – songwriter, producer
- Christian Chávez – chorus vocals
- Christopher von Uckermann – chorus vocals
- Dulce María – chorus vocals
- Guido Laris – chorus vocals
- Maite Perroni – lead vocals
