= Rebelde (song) =

2004 debut single by Mexican pop group RBD

Single by RBD

from the album Rebelde
- Language: Spanish
- English title: "Rebel"
- Released: 30 September 2004 (Mexico); 11 January 2005 (worldwide); 1 November 2005 (Portuguese version)
- Recorded: 2004
- Genre: Latin pop; pop rock; teen pop
- Length: 3:34
- Label: EMI
- Songwriters: Carlos Lara (Note: Originally credited as DJ Kafka); Max di Carlo
- Producers: Lara; di Carlo

RBD singles chronology
"Rebelde" (2004)	"Sólo Quédate En Silencio" (2004)

Music video
- "Rebelde" on YouTube

"Rebelde" is the debut single by Mexican pop group RBD. It was released on 30 September 2004 by EMI as the lead single from the group's debut album of the same name (2004). It was written and produced by Carlos Lara and Max di Carlo. The song contains a mix of Latin pop and pop rock in its instrumentation and lyrically sees the group describing what makes them rebellious.

The single was used as the first theme song for the telenovela Rebelde (2004–06), which helped it enter several charts around the world, topping the Mexican charts. It received positive reviews from critics and is widely considered to be the RBD's signature song. Its music video was directed by the show's executive producer Pedro Damián and features the cast partying at a mansion, and the group singing on an empty stage. A Portuguese version with the same name was released as the first single of the album's Brazilian reissue on 1 November 2005. The song appears on all of the band's live CDs and DVDs recorded during their tours, and was performed extensively by the group during 2004 and 2005. It was named by Billboard as the second best telenovela theme song of all time in 2025.

== Background and release ==
In June 2004, production on the teen-oriented telenovela Rebelde began, with Pedro Damián serving as executive producer. Its six young lead actors, Anahí, Alfonso Herrera, Dulce María, Christopher von Uckermann, Maite Perroni, and Christian Chávez, formed RBD as part of the contract with the company Televisa to promote the show. They recorded their first album in two days, and "Rebelde" was released as the lead single on 30 September 2004. The telenovela premiered on Televisa in Mexico on 4 October, and went on to achieve high ratings in the country. Their debut album Rebelde was released on 30 November, to commercial success. After achieving significant success in Brazil, the group recorded a Portuguese-language version of the album, adapted solely by Cláudio Rabello, with "Rebelde - Versão Português" accompanying it as the lead single. A cumbia version and a rock version were performed as the final number during the first and second legs of the band's first concert series, Tour Generación RBD, respectively.

== Composition and lyrics ==
The song, written by and produced Carlos Lara and Max di Carlo, is a combination of Latin pop, pop rock, and teen pop that lasts for three minutes and 34 seconds. It uses the typical verse-pre-chorus-chorus-post-chorus structure, with an instrumental bridge featuring an electric guitar solo. The song is set in the key of G major with 95 beats per minute.

The first verse is sung by Anahí and Alfonso, saying that they think about each other while their fathers scold them for how they act: "...Mi padre grita otra vez / Que me malgasto mi futuro y su paz / Con mi manera de ser". The second verse is performed by Christian and Dulce María, where Christian promises to run away one day "...para jugarme todo por un sueño". Meanwhile, Dulce tells the listener that they have to bet on everything despite the two outcomes: "Todo en la vida es a perder o ganar/Hay que apostar, hay que apostar sin miedo". The pre-choruses are sung by both duos, with a difference in the first lines; Anahí and Alfonso sing, "Aunque lo escucho ya estoy lejos de aquí", contrary to Dulce and Christian's, "No importa mucho lo que digan de mí". Both end with "Cierro los ojos y ya estoy pensando en ti". In the chorus the band chant: "Y soy rebelde", every two lines, and making statements in-between, such as: "Cuando te quiero hasta rabiar", and "Cuando me juego hasta la piel". The post-choruses are sung by Chrisitan and Anahí. One notable aspect of the song is that Maite and Christopher do not sing, despite the latter having a more prominent role in the telenovela than Christian. However, in the music video and during shows, the second post-chorus is sung by Maite, even when the band was required to use playback in some televised performances.

== Music video ==
The music video was released alongside the song. It was directed by Damián and featured several cast members from the show. The band and actors from the telenovela arrive at a house for an exclusive party. Throughout the video, the teens and young adults party throughout the house. The group, dressed in black clothes with fake tattoos, is also seen singing on a stage while performing some choreographed dance moves. They keep rebelling throughout the video even though their parents are around. At the end of the clip, they are led into the woods by a man to cleanse them of their sins.

With the re-release of the group's music in 2020, the song's music video has garnered over 14 million views on YouTube as of September 2023.

== Live performances ==
RBD performed the song on television and radio stations to promote the telenovela Rebelde during 2004. It was also included on all of their concert series, starting with the Tour Generación RBD where the song was the opening and closing number, with a Cumbia version performed during 2005 and a rock version during 2006 and 2007. The live albums Tour Generación RBD En Vivo and its DVD, and Live in Hollywood with its video counterpart, were recorded and released during the first two years. The latter featured the song on the "Medley Rebelde", performed alongside "Sólo Quédate En Silencio" and "Sálvame". During the concerts in Brazil, RBD performed a Portuguese rock version of the song to close the shows. The DVD Live in Rio, filmed in 2006 and released in 2007, contains a performance of this version.

"Rebelde" was performed by the group during the Tour Celestial, Empezar Desde Cero World Tour, and Tour del Adiós; three concerts from these tours spawned the 2007 CD and DVD Hecho en España, and the DVDs Live in Brasília and Tournée do Adeus, both recorded in 2008 and released in 2009. The performance in Live in Brasília is a mix of both versions. Anahí has the public sing her solo while Alfonso sings his part and the pre-chorus in Portuguese. Christian sings his post-chorus in both languages before he and Dulce perform the second verse in Portuguese; Dulce continues the pre-chorus in the same language while Christian switches to Spanish. Maite sings her post-chorus in Spanish, and the choruses features the members each singing in one of the languages.

RBD sang the song at the end of their Ser O Parecer: The Global Virtual Union live show in December 2020. Dulce María and Alfonso Herrera both missed the concert due to personal reasons, and Christopher and Maite sang their solos. With Dulce's return, the band performed the song as the closing number on their 2023 Soy Rebelde Tour, where the intro featured the members, dressed in newly made uniforms from the telenovela, taking the red blazers from their mannequins and putting them on before starting the song. Alfonso's absence caused Christopher to once again perform his lines during the tour.

== Other versions ==
In October 2021, the main cast of the Mexican 2022 Netflix series Rebelde released a cover version of the song, included on the album Rebelde la Serie (Official Soundtrack).

Mexican rock music group Moderatto released a version of "Rebelde" on 18 August 202,2 in collaboration with Brazilian singer Paula Fernandes. The song was released as the seventh single from the album Rockea Bien Duro (2022), recorded in homage to RBD.

== Commercial performance ==
The song gave the band recognition in Mexico, the United States, Spain, and the rest of Latin America.

In the group's home country, the song peaked at number 1 on the charts, and became the nation's biggest hit in 2005. In the U.S., it peaked at number 37 on the Billboard Hot Latin Songs chart and at number 21 in its Latin Pop Airplay chart. "Rebelde" reached number 1 on the charts in El Salvador, Guatemala, and Spain, while peaking at number 5 in Panama and at number 35 in Venezuela.

In 2008, "Rebelde" was certificated Gold in Brazil.

== Charts ==
Chart performance for "Rebelde"
Chart (2004–2008)	Peak position
Brazil (Crowley)	63
Chile (Lincoln Journal)	1
El Salvador (Notimex)	1
Guatemala (Notimex)	1
Mexico (Hispanos Unidos)	1
Panama (EFE)	5
US Latin Pop Airplay (Billboard)	21
US Hot Latin Songs (Billboard)	37
Venezuela (Record Report)	35

== Certifications ==
Region	Certification	Certified units/sales
Brazil (Pro-Música Brasil)	Gold	20, 000

== Awards and nominations ==
Awards and nominations for "Rebelde"
Year	Ceremony	Award	Result	Ref.
2005	Premios Juventud	La Más Pegajosa	Nominated	
2005	Premios Oye!	Video del Año	Nominated	
2005	Premios Oye!	Canción del Año	Nominated	
2006	Premios TVyNovelas	Mejor Tema de Telenovela	Won	

== Track listings ==
Digital download / Rebelde

1. "Rebelde" – 3:34

Digital download / Tour Generación RBD En Vivo

1. "Rebelde - Versión Cumbia / En Directo" – 3:54

Digital download / Rebelde (Edição Brasil)

1. "Rebelde - Versão Português" – 3:34

Digital download / Live in Hollywood

1. "Medley Rebelde" (Medley with "Sólo Quédate En Silencio" and "Sálvame") (Note: "Sólo Quédate En Silencio" was written by Maurício Arriaga and "Sálvame" contains lyrical contributions from Pedro Damián.)

== Credits and personnel ==
- Alfonso Herrera – vocals
- Anahí – vocals
- Carlos Lara – songwriter, producer, chorus vocals
- Cláudio Rabello – song adaptation to Portuguese
- Christian Chavez – vocals
- Christopher von Uckermann – vocals (Note: Only in live performances and Portuguese version)
- Dulce María – vocals
- Lynda Thomas – chorus vocals, harmony (uncredited)
- Maite Perroni – vocals
- Max di Carlo – songwriter, producer
