= Production coordinator =

Position in video or film production

A production coordinator is a position in film, television or video production.

In Los Angeles, it is called production office coordinator and abbreviated POC, and is a unionized position under the International Alliance of Theatrical Stage Employees (IATSE) and is governed by Local 871. The IA bylaws state the POC's wage is "subject to negotiation with the Producer". Fringe benefits include inclusion with the (USA) industry's Motion Picture Industry Pension & Health Plans.

Production coordinators are in charge of organizing the production office, writing and distributing crew lists, handing out scripts to cast and crew members, and dealing with transport captains. They often work directly with the production manager.
