= Y No Puedo Olvidarte =

Single by RBD

from the album Empezar Desde Cero
- Language: Spanish
- English title: "And I Can't Forget You"
- Released: 5 June 2008
- Recorded: 2007
- Genre: Latin pop
- Length: 3:57
- Label: EMI; Capitol Records
- Songwriter: Carlos Lara
- Producers: Carlos Lara; Gustavo Borner

RBD singles chronology
"Empezar Desde Cero" (2008)	"Y No Puedo Olvidarte" (2008)	"Para Olvidarte de Mí" (2009)

Music video
- "Y No Puedo Olvidarte" on YouTube

"Y No Puedo Olvidarte" is a song by Mexican pop group RBD. It's the third and final single from their fifth and fourth Spanish studio album, Empezar Desde Cero (2007). The song was announced as the third single on 5 June 2008, followed by a common Mexican radio release on the same day. The single supports the re-released fan edition of Empezar Desde Cero, which was available since 21 June 2008 in Mexico. An official music video was not filmed.

== Background and release ==
The previous single, "Empezar Desde Cero" was chosen through a poll on RBD's official website. "Y No Puedo Olvidarte" finished in second place, with 30% of the votes (while "Empezar Desde Cero" gained 40%), ending the decision of choosing a third single.

On 17 July 2008, the song was performed for the first time on television on Univision's Premios Juventud, with the absence of Maite Perroni, due to her filming the telenovela Cuidado con el ángel. After the release of the parent album, "Y No Puedo Olvidarte" was included in the setlists at numerous presentations and promotional stops as well as being performed during their final two tours.

== Music video ==
A music video was commissioned to be filmed following the announcement of the song's release as a single. However, after the announcement of the group's disbandment, the video's filming was cancelled, as well as further promotion for the song.

== Credits and personnel ==
- Alfonso Herrera – vocals (Note: Live performances only)
- Anahí – vocals
- Carlos Lara – producer, songwriter
- Christian Chávez – vocals
- Christopher von Uckermann – vocals
- Dulce María – vocals
- Gustavo Borner – producer
- Lynda Thomas – harmony, chorus vocals (uncredited)
- Maite Perroni – vocals
