= Sólo Quédate En Silencio =

2004 single by RBD

Single by RBD

from the album Rebelde
- Language: Spanish
- Released: 2 December 2004
- Genre: Pop
- Length: 3:37
- Label: EMI
- Songwriter: Mauricio L. Arriaga
- Producer: Armando Ávila

RBD singles chronology
"Rebelde" (2004)	"Sólo Quédate En Silencio" (2004)	"Sálvame" (2005)

Music video
- "Sólo Quédate En Silencio" on YouTube

"Sólo Quédate En Silencio" is a song by Mexican group RBD from their debut album, Rebelde (2004). It was written by Mauricio L. Arriaga and produced by Armando Ávila. The song was released as the album's second single in December 2004 by EMI. It's a "mid-tempo pop" track that features the group members singing to one another about enjoying the final moments of a fleeting romance. The lyrical content was praised by music critics. RBD also recorded versions of the song in Portuguese and English, titled "Fique em Silêncio" (2005) and "Keep It Down Low" (2006), respectively. The accompanying music video for the Spanish version was directed by Pedro Damián and filmed in Mexico City.

Commercially, "Sólo Quédate En Silencio" was a success, peaking in the top ten on record charts in countries such as Chile, El Salvador, Honduras, and Mexico. It became RBD's first number one song on the Billboard Latin Pop Airplay and Regional Mexican Airplay charts in the United States. It was recognized as one of the best-performing Latin songs of the year at the 2006 American Society of Composers, Authors and Publishers (ASCAP) Latin Awards. "Sólo Quédate En Silencio" was included in the set lists for the Tour Generación RBD (2005–07), Tour Celestial (2007–08), Empezar Desde Cero Tour (2008), Tour del Adiós (2008), and Soy Rebelde Tour (2023).

== Background and composition ==
Following the success of the Mexican telenovela Rebelde (2004–06), RBD released their debut album, also titled Rebelde, on 30 November 2004, through EMI. The album achieved major commercial success, with 1.5 million copies sold worldwide until 2006 and received Diamond certification from the Asociación Mexicana de Productores de Fonogramas y Videogramas (AMPROFON). "Sólo Quédate En Silencio", written by Mauricio L. Arriaga and produced by Armando Ávila, has been referred by Billboard's Jessica Roiz as "a mid-tempo pop" song. The track, as noted by Mariana Canhisares from Omelete, matches "Sálvame" in emotional intensity. Lyrically, Uproxx editor Lucas Villa described it as an "electrifying love song" where "the men and women of the group sing to each other about enjoying the final moments of a fleeting romance." He placed it at number three on his list of RBD's 20 best songs. Ana Clara Ribeiro, writing for Remezcla, saw the member dialogue as a "way to blend their different types of voices and to incorporate a bit of the romantic tension from the characters that the members played in the show." From the same publication, Alan López described the track as a "puppy love anthem".

== Promotion and reception ==
"Sólo Quédate En Silencio" was released as the second single from Rebelde on 2 December 2004, by EMI. A remix of the track was included on Best Of Remixes (2009), while the track itself was included on group's greatest hits album Best Of (2008). The accompanying music video was directed by Pedro Damián, and features the group performing in Mexico City. At the 2006 ASCAP Latin Music Awards, it was recognized as the best-performing Latin songs of the year under "Pop/Balada" category. That year, at the 2006 13th Billboard Latin Music Awards, the track was nominated for three categories, including Latin Pop Airplay Song Of The Year – Duo or Group, Latin Pop Airplay Song Of The Year – New Artist, and Latin Ringtone of the Year. Commercially, it became RBD's first number one song on the Billboard Latin Pop Airplay and Regional Mexican Airplay charts, also peaking at number two in Chile and Mexico.

A corresponding version in Portuguese, "Fique em Silêncio", was included in the album Rebelde: Edição Brasil (2005). This version was written by Cláudio Rabello and released as a single on Brazilian radio stations. It was the 25th best-performing track of 2006 on the Crowley Broadcast Analysis year-end chart. The song was re-recorded in English, titled "Keep It Down Low", included in their first and only English album Rebels (2006). "Sólo Quédate En Silencio" was covered by the cast of the web series Rebelde (2022) as part of the show's soundtrack. Mexican rock band Moderatto recorded a cover in collaboration with singer-songwriter Danna Paola for their eighth album, Rockea Bien Duro. The song was performed at the Tour Generación RBD (2005–07), Tour Celestial (2007–08), Empezar Desde Cero Tour (2008), Tour del Adiós (2008), and Soy Rebelde Tour (2023).

== Track listing ==
- Mexican promo CD single
1. "Sólo Quédate En Silencio" – 3:37

== Personnel ==
Adapted from the Rebelde notes:

- RBD – lead vocals
- Mauricio L. Arriaga – songwriter
- Armando Ávila – producer

== Charts ==
=== Weekly charts ===
Weekly chart performance for "Sólo Quédate En Silencio" during its original release
Chart (2005–2007)	Peak position
Brazil (Crowley Broadcast Analysis) "Fique em Silêncio"	1
Chile (Lincoln Journal Star)	2
El Salvador (La Nación)	1
Honduras (La Nación)	1
Mexico (Monitor Latino)	2
Mexico Spanish AC/POP (Monitor Latino)	28
US Hot Latin Songs (Billboard)	2
US Latin Airplay (Billboard)	2
US Latin Pop Airplay (Billboard)	1
US Regional Mexican Airplay (Billboard)	1

=== Year-end charts ===
2005 year-end chart performance for "Sólo Quédate En Silencio"
Chart (2005)	Position
US Hot Latin Songs (Billboard)	26
US Latin Pop Airplay (Billboard)	11

2006 year-end chart performance for "Sólo Quédate En Silencio"
Chart (2006)	Position
Brazil (Crowley Broadcast Analysis) "Fique em Silêncio"	25
US Latin Pop Airplay (Billboard)	25

=== Decade-end charts ===
Decade-end chart performance for "Sólo Quédate En Silencio"
Chart (2000s)	Position
US Latin Pop Airplay (Billboard)	34

== Release history ==
Release dates and formats for "Sólo Quédate En Silencio"
Region	Date	Format(s)	Label(s)	Ref.
Mexico	2 December 2004	CD	EMI	

== See also ==
- List of number-one Billboard Latin Pop Airplay songs of 2005
