= No pares =

"No Pares"

Single by RBD

from the album Live in Hollywood
- Language: Spanish
- English title: "Don't Stop"
- Released: 19 April 2006
- Recorded: January 2006
- Genre: Pop rock; Ballad; Acoustic
- Length: 3:51 (Studio version); 4:16 (Live version)
- Label: EMI
- Songwriter: Lynda Thomas
- Producer: Carlos Lara

RBD singles chronology
"México, México" (2006)	"No Pares" (2006)	"Ser o Parecer" (2006)

Music video
- "No Pares" on YouTube

"No Pares" is a song by Mexican pop group RBD, from their second live album, Live in Hollywood (2006). It was the first and only single released from the album. The song was written by Lynda Thomas and performed by Dulce María. "No Pares" won the Orgullosamente Latino Award for Canción Latina 2007 (Latin Song 2007), beating the group's own "Ser o Parecer".

== Background and release ==
"No Pares" was a new song written by Thomas and performed by Dulce María. Thomas had previously contributed uncredited vocals on the band's first two Spanish albums, only using a pseudonym when co-writing the track "Liso, Sensual" from Nuestro Amor. The song was performed during the second leg of the group's Tour Generación RBD, which was reworked to now be mainly in support of their second studio album Nuestro Amor. The band's show at the Pantages Theatre in Los Angeles, California, was recorded on January 21, 2006, and released on April 4, as their second live material. "No Pares" appears two times on the album; first as the seventh track, which is the acoustic live version, and again as a bonus track, which is its studio version. Both of them were used as radio singles.

== Composition and lyrics ==
"No Pares" was written by Mexican singer-songwriter Lynda Thomas, with production from Carlos Lara in its studio version, which contains pop rock stylings, and features the voices of the two alongside bandmate Maite Perroni on the choruses. "No Pares" contains themes of encouragement, with lyrics about living one's life and chasing their dreams.

In the first verse, Dulce assures the listener that "Nadie puede pisotear tu libertad" ("No one can stomp your liberty"), and advises: "Grita fuerte por si te quieren callar" ("Scream loudly if they want to silence you"), while promising that "Nada puede detenerte si tú tienes fe" ("Nothing can stop you if you have faith").

In the second verse she says "Si censuran tus ideas ten valor / No te rindas nunca, siempre alza la voz" ("If they censor your ideas have courage / Don't give up, never, always raise your voice"), and continues with "Lucha fuerte sin medida, no dejes de creer" ("Fight strongly, without measure, don't stop believing").

In the third verse, Dulce pleads "No construyas muros en tu corazón" ("Don't build walls in your heart"), before adivising "Lo que hagas siempre hazlo por amor" ("What you do, always do it for love"). She motivates the person with the lines "Pon las alas, contra el viento / No hay nada que perder" ("Put your wings, against the wind / There's nothing to lose").

All verses end with the line "No te quedes con tu nombre escrito en la pared, en la pared" ("Don't stay with your name written on the wall, on the wall"). During the song's chorus, Dulce urges the person to "[not] stop dreaming" and "not be afraid to fly". She encourages "Vive tu vida" ("Live your life"), in a hopeful manner. The outro features Dulce doing small ad-libs.

In the live version, the first and second verses appear before the first chorus, while the studio version puts the second verse after the first chorus. The third verse is changed into a bridge, with Dulce singing the first half of the chorus in a slower, more melodic way. Some lyrics from the second and third verse/bridge are also changed around.

== Music video ==
No official music video was shot for the song. Therefore, the live performance taken from the Live in Hollywood DVD was used to promote the single. The video was edited to promote "No Pares" on many music channels and cut down to around one minute and a half to serve as the fourth opening for the third season of the telenovela Rebelde.

== Track listing ==
- Digital download / Studio version
1. "No Pares [Bonus Track]" - 3:51
- Digital download / Live acoustic version
1. "No Pares" - 4:16

== Credits and personnel ==
- Carlos Lara – producer, chorus vocals (Note: Only in the studio version.) (uncredited)
- Dulce María – vocals
- Lynda Thomas – songwriter, harmonies, chorus vocals (uncredited)
- Maite Perroni – harmonies, chorus vocals

== Release history ==
Country	Release date
Mexico	April 2006
United Kingdom	August 20, 2006

== Awards ==
Year	Ceremony	Award	Result	Ref.
2007	Orgullosamente Latino Award	Latin Song of the Year	Won	
