= Wanessa Camargo discography =

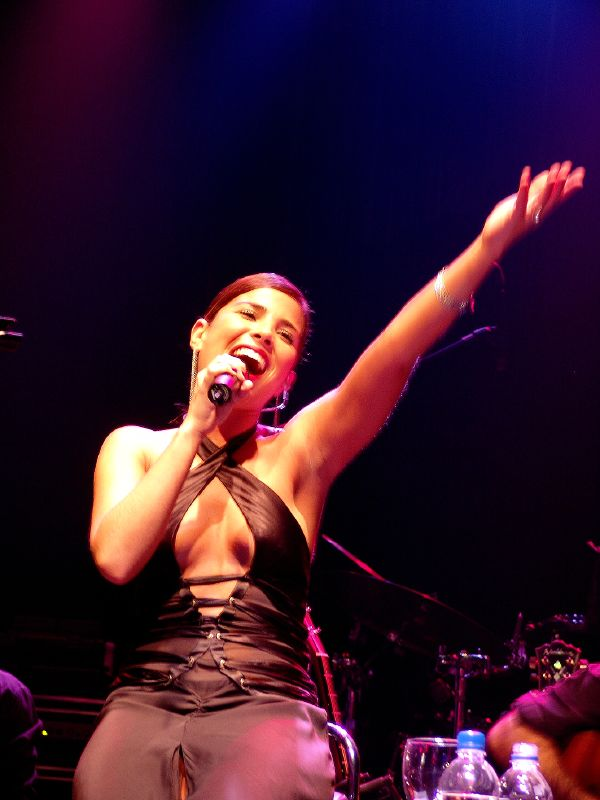
- Studio albums: 10
- Extended plays: 2
- Live albums: 1
- Singles: 23
- Video albums: 1
- Promotional singles: 4

Wanessa Camargo's discography includes seven studio albums, 2 live albums, 1 extended play and a DVD. In 2000, she began her career with the single "Love Will Not Leave", which debuted at number one and brought a sound between pop and country pop. In 2004, she released her first live album and DVD titled Transparent – Live, where it sold 200,000 copies and marked the year with the success of the track "Half of Me."

In 2007, she changed her artistic name to only Wanessa, releasing the album Total. The album sold about 100,000 copies and gave the singer her first certified platinum, marking the great success of the single "Abrázame", a collaboration with Mexican band Camila. In 2010, the singer released Você não Perde por Esperar, her first fully commercialized EP for digital download music in the form of ticket, which contains four tracks. In 2011, she released her seventh album DNA, completely in English.

== Albums ==
=== Studio albums ===
| Title | Album details | Sales | Certifications |
|---|---|---|---|
| Wanessa Camargo | Released: November 15, 2000; Formats: CD, digital download; Label: Sony BMG | BRA: 300,000 | ABPD: Platinum |
| Wanessa Camargo | Released: November 10, 2001; Formats: CD, digital download; Label: Sony BMG | BRA: 350,000 | ABPD: Platinum |
| Wanessa Camargo | Released: Dezember 5, 2002; Formats: CD, digital download; Label: Sony BMG | BRA: 350,000 | ABPD: Platinum |
| W | Released: August 10, 2005; Formats: CD, digital download; Label: Sony BMG | BRA: 125,000 | ABPD: Gold |
| Total | Released: August 21, 2007; Formats: CD, digital download; Label: Sony BMG | BRA: 150,000 | ABPD: Platinum |
| Meu Momento | Released: May 29, 2009; Formats: CD, digital download; Label: Sony BMG | BRA: 100,000 | ABPD: Platinum |
| DNA | Released: July 28, 2011; Formats: CD, digital download; Label: Sony BMG | BRA: 30,000 | |
| 33 | Released: August 19, 2016; Formats: CD, digital download; Label: Work Show, Som Livre | BRA: 5,000 | |
| Universo Invertido | Released: October 9, 2020; Formats: CD, digital download; Label: ONErpm, Independent | | |

=== Live albums ===
| Title | Album details | Sales | Certifications |
|---|---|---|---|
| Transparente – Ao Vivo | Released: April 12, 2009; Label: Sony BMG; Format: DVD, CD, digital download | BRA: 100,000 | ABPD: Gold |
| DNA Tour | Released: April 30, 2013; Label: Sony Music; Format: DVD, CD, digital download | BRA: 40,000 | |

=== Video albums ===
| Title | Album details | Sales | Certifications |
|---|---|---|---|
| Transparente – Ao Vivo | Released: April 12, 2004; Label: Sony BMG; Format: DVD, CD, digital download | BRA: 25,000 | ABPD: Gold |
| DNA Tour | Released: April 30, 2013; Label: Sony Music; Format: DVD, CD, digital download | BRA: 22,000 | |

=== Extended plays ===
List of albums
| Title | Album details |
|---|---|
| Total (CD Zero) | Released: August 15, 2007; Label: Sony BMG; Format: CD, digital download |
| Você não Perde por Esperar | Released: September 11, 2010; Label: Sony BMG; Format: Music ticket, digital download |

== Singles ==
List of singles, with selected chart positions and certifications
| Title | Year | Peak chart positions | Album |
| Title | Year | BRA | Album |
|---|---|---|---|
| "O Amor Não Deixa" | 2000 | 1 | Wanessa Camargo |
| "Apaixonada Por Você" | 2001 | 1 | Wanessa Camargo |
| "Eu Posso Te Sentir" | 2001 | 34 | Wanessa Camargo |
| "Eu Quero Ser o Seu Amor" | 2001 | 9 | Wanessa Camargo |
| "Tanta Saudade" | 2002 | 3 | Wanessa Camargo |
| "Gostar de Mim" | 2002 | 83 | Wanessa Camargo |
| "Um Dia... Meu Primeiro Amor" | 2002 | 11 | Wanessa Camargo |
| "Sem Querer" | 2003 | 11 | Wanessa Camargo |
| "Filme de Amor" | 2003 | 62 | Wanessa Camargo |
| "Me Engana Que Eu Gosto" | 2004 | 4 | Transparente – Ao Vivo |
| "Metade de Mim" | 2004 | 11 | Transparente – Ao Vivo |
| "Amor, Amor" | 2005 | 4 | W |
| "Não Resisto a Nós Dois" | 2006 | 2 | W |
| "Louca" | 2006 | 9 | W |
| "Não Tô Pronta Pra Perdoar" | 2007 | 15 | Total |
| "Me Abrace" (feat. Camila) | 2008 | 2 | Total |
| "Fly" (feat. Ja Rule) | 2009 | 1 | Meu Momento |
| "Não Me Leve a Mal" | 2009 | 15 | Meu Momento |
| "Falling for U" (feat. Mr. Jam) | 2010 | 23 | Você não Perde por Esperar |
| "Worth It" | 2010 | 18 | Você não Perde por Esperar |
| "Stuck on Repeat" | 2011 | — | Você não Perde por Esperar |
| "Sticky Dough" (feat. Bam Bam) | 2011 | 41 | DNA |
| "DNA" | 2011 | 82 | DNA |
| "Get Loud!" | 2011 | — | DNA |
| "Hair & Soul" | 2012 | 19 | DNA Tour |
| "Shine It On" | 2013 | 22 | DNA Tour |
| "Turn It Up" | 2013 | 68 | DNA Tour |
| "Coração Embriagado" | 2016 | 19 | 33 |
| "Anestesia" | 2017 | 31 | 33 |
| "Mulher Gato" | 2018 | — | —N/a |
| "Bumbum no Ar" (with Lia Clark) | 2018 | — | —N/a |
| "Tum Tum" (with Francinne) | 2018 | — | —N/a |
| "Loko!" | 2018 | — | —N/a |
| "Vou Lembrar" | 2019 | — | Universo Invertido |
| "Por Favor" | 2019 | — | Universo Invertido |
| "Cuida de Mim" | 2019 | — | Universo Invertido |
| "Desiste Não" | 2019 | — | Universo Invertido |
| "Inquebrável" | 2020 | — | Universo Invertido |
| "Lábios de Navalha" | 2020 | — | Universo Invertido |
| "Sozinha" | 2020 | — | Universo Invertido |

=== Promotional singles ===
| Single | Year | Album |
|---|---|---|
| "Relaxa" | 2006 | W |
| "Culpada" | 2007 | W |
| "Amuleto Protetor" | 2008 | Total |
| "Independente (Ladies Night)" | 2008 | Total |
| "Vai que Vira Amor" | 2016 | 33 |

=== As featured artist ===
| Title | Year | Album |
|---|---|---|
| "Beast" (Tommy Love part. Wanessa) | 2014 | Tommy Love |
| "Metronome" (Cymcolé part. Wanessa) | 2014 | —N/a |
| "Wanna Be" (Mister Jam part. Wanessa) | 2015 | —N/a |

== Other appearances ==
| Song | Year | Artist | Album |
|---|---|---|---|
| "Tudo Que Você Sonhar" | 2002 | —N/a | Xuxa e os Duendes |
| "Eu Não Sabia Que Você Existia" | 2003 | Leandro Scornavacca | Jovens Tardes |
| "You're My Everything" | 2003 | Leandro Scornavacca | Jovens Tardes |
| "Estupido Cupido" | 2003 | —N/a | Jovens Tardes |
| "O Lavrador" | 2005 | Nando Reis | 2 Filhos de Francisco (OST) |
| "Amor de Praia" | 2005 | Felipe Dylon | Caldeirão do Huck |
| "Patty Pop" | 2006 | —N/a | Sítio do Pica-pau Amarelo |
| "Eu Nasci Pra Amar Você" | 2007 | Zezé di Camargo & Luciano | Raridades |
| "Para Hacer El Amor" | 2008 | Jaime Camil | Jaime Camil – Vol.3 |
| "O Sonho Não Termina" | 2008 | —N/a | High School Musical: A Seleção |
| "Tocando em Frente" | 2008 | Agnaldo Rayol | Agnaldo Rayol – Ao Vivo |
| "Conselho De Amiga" | 2009 | Renata Ferreira | High School Musical: O Desafio |
| "Atuar, Dançar, Cantar" | 2009 | Elenco de HSM: O Desafio | High School Musical: O Desafio |
| "Gosto Tanto" | 2009 | —N/a | High School Musical: O Desafio |
| "Tuesday" | 2009 | Carlo Dall'Anese | Sweetmad |
| "Party in this Club" | 2012 | Volk | Volk |
| "Me Pega de Jeito" | 2013 | Claudia Leitte e Naldo Benny | Axemusic - Ao Vivo |
