= High School Musical (disambiguation) =

High School Musical is a 2006 American television film and the first installment in the High School Musical trilogy.

High School Musical may also refer to:

- High School Musical (franchise)
  - High School Musical (soundtrack)
  - High School Musical 2
    - High School Musical 2 (soundtrack)
  - High School Musical 3: Senior Year
    - High School Musical 3: Senior Year (soundtrack), including the song "High School Musical"
- High School Musical: The Concert, a concert tour featuring the cast of the film
- High School Musical on Stage!, the stage adaption of the film
- High School Musical: Get in the Picture, a reality show related to the film series
- High School Musical: A Seleção, a reality television game show
  - High School Musical: O Desafio, the spin-off starred by the winners
- High School Musical (book series)
- High School Musical: The Musical: The Series, an American mockumentary musical drama television series inspired by the High School Musical film series
  - High School Musical: The Musical: The Series: The Soundtrack

== Video games ==
- High School Musical: Sing It!, a video game based on the film for consoles
- High School Musical: Makin' the Cut!, a video game based on the film for Nintendo DS
- High School Musical 2: Work This Out!, a video game based on the film for Nintendo DS

== See also ==
- High School Musical: El Desafío (disambiguation)
- Elementary School Musical (disambiguation)
