= Shaking (Party People) =

Single by Kelly Key

from the album Studio K
- Released: January 5, 2012
- Recorded: 2011
- Genre: Pop, house
- Length: 3:31
- Label: JamWorks Music
- Songwriter: Mister Jam
- Producer: Mister Jam

Kelly Key singles chronology
"O Problema É Meu" (2011)	"Shaking (Party People)" (2012)

"Shaking (Party People)" is a song performed by Brazilian recording artist Kelly Key. It is the lead single from Key's seventh studio album Studio K (2012). The song was released on January 5, 2012. It features production from DJ and producer Mister Jam, who had worked with Brazilian singer Wanessa in her 2011 album DNA and her EP Você não Perde por Esperar.

== Composition ==
On August 28 the singer said she had begun recording an English-language track, as yet untitled, for the new album: "Wait, my first song in English is on the way, comes next week! I have done classes and studied long I am almost a native". Only on October 20 announced the title of his new single, "Shaking", saying it would be released on December 2 and bring an overproduction and a video clip released the same month.

== Release history ==
Country	Date	Format	Label
Brazil	November 23, 2011	digital download	JamWorks Music
Brazil	January 5, 2012	airplay	JamWorks Music
