= 33 (Wanessa album) =

Studio album by Wanessa Camargo
- Released: 19 August 2016
- Recorded: 2016
- Genres: Sertanejo; arrocha
- Length: 40:48
- Language: Portuguese
- Labels: Work Show; Som Livre
- Producers: Eduardo Pepato; César Lemos

Wanessa Camargo chronology
DNA Tour (2013)	33 (2016)

Singles from 33
- 1. "Coração Embriagado" Released: 5 August 2016; 2. "Vai que Vira Amor" Released: 26 August 2016; 3. "Anestesia" Released: 10 March 2017

33 is the eighth studio album by Brazilian singer Wanessa Camargo. Originally the album was released on 19 August 2016 exclusively for free digital download through Palco MP3, Brazilian portal of execution of online music. On 14 October 2016 is released for digital sale through iTunes independently by its producer Work Show. At the end of 2016 the singer signs with Som Livre and on 28 March 2017, the album is re-released by the label - this time also in physical form - bringing two new songs as bonus. The album marks the transfer of the artist of pop to the sertanejo, musical genre that adopted from then on.

The first single of the album was "Coração Embriagado", composed by the sertanejo duo João Neto & Frederico in partnership with Gabriel of Cavaco, Shylton Fernandes and Diego Ferrari and was officially launched on the digital platforms on 5 August. "Vai que Vira Amor" was released as a promotional single on 26 July. "Anesthesia" was released as a second single on 10 March 2017.

== Background ==
On 22 August 2014 the producer Mr. Jam confirmed that Wanessa began working on a new album unpublished, being produced by him. However, only on 13 March 2015 did the singer confirm that she was really engaged in the project, saying that it would take a few months to be released and citing her W album as a reference of what she was doing, claiming that she was seeking a sonority between pop and electronic. In April he confirmed that he was recording with producer César Lemos, who had previously worked with her on albums W and Meu Momento, using tracks "Amor, Amor" and "Sem Querer" as references of the material he was preparing. On 8 July, during an interview for Quem magazine, she revealed that the new album would mix songs in English and Portuguese, since she had not recorded in the native language for six years: "It's a fusion of everything I did before with I'm always reinventing myself, looking for new things, but with more maturity." Soon after confirmed the partnership in compositions with Liah Soares and Junno Andrade.

On 8 December, however, he announced that he gave up recording tracks in English and that the new album would be entirely in Portuguese, mixing dance songs and other romantic songs, returning the missing link before on the album Meu Momento. In addition, Wanessa revealed that he was composing again, which did not make the album cited, and intended to bring a mostly authorial work: "The album will be more personal than I could ever imagine. very introspective and mature, but will have more agitated bands." At the beginning of 2016 he photographed for the insert and dissemination of the new work, having the photos recorded by Fernando Mazza and the clothes signed by Alexandre Dornellas. According to her husband, Marcus Buaiz, the expectation was that the disc was released in May.

== Recording and development ==
"I was going to a job that would be very quick to do, in the way of "Shine It On." But I looked at work and was horny, without passion. I was doing it for you. That's when I stopped and thought. I'm a country singer. I consider myself sertaneja, romantic."

On 17 May, Wanessa announces that he has crated the material he was recording until then and switched the producer team to make a redirection in his career, leaving pop music to focus on sertanejo music now. For this, it adopted again the surname Camargo in its artistic name, which had been retired 8 years before for the album Total. At the time he entered the studio to record his eighth album again, this time under the new genre chosen, bringing Eduardo Pepato as producer, the same as the work of Luan Santana and Thaeme & Thiago. According to Wanessa, the decision to change the musical genre was based on the personal identification of the sertanejo music: "The road to pop in Brazil, I do not identify myself. It is not my beach. My footprint is romanticism and the sertanejo is a strong brand of my next album. I'm doing what I believe."

In addition, the singer explained that she was looking to do great shows in arenas again: "I want to run Brazil with the structure that I have always wanted, with the electronic, I went through each situation." Soon after breaking with Sony Music, alleging disagreements about the course of his career, since the record company would not like it to leave the pop sound, signing soon after with the Work Show, producer responsible for launching the market sertanejo. The first track announced as part of the album was "Now I Know," written in honor of her husband. On 15 June a preview of "Vai que Vira Amor" is released.

== Release ==
The album was released on 19 August exclusively for streaming and free digital download through Palco MP3, the best-known Brazilian online music portal. On 14 October 2016 is released for digital sale through iTunes and streaming independently by its producer Work Show. On 20 December 2016, Wanessa announces that he had signed with Som Livre and on 10 March 2017 the album is re-released by the label - this time also in physical form, in addition to the previous formats -, bringing two new songs as bonus.

== Singles ==
- On 26 July, Wanessa released the first single from the album, "Coração Embriagado", composed by the country duo João Neto & Frederico in partnership with Gabriel do Cavaco, Shylton Fernandes and Diego Ferrari. The band's music video was released on 29 July, showing the singer recording it in studio and playing on her guitar. The single was officially released on digital platforms on 5 August. "Coração Embriagado" reached the position nineteen on Billboard Brasil, being the best result of his career until then.
- "Vai que Vira Amor" was released as a second single on 26 August on digital platforms. The music video of the song was released two weeks earlier, on 9 August, following the same line as the previous one, featuring the singer recording it in the studio.
- "Anestesia", present in the re-release of the album, was released as third single on 10 March 2017.

== Promotion ==
On 20 August he presented himself at the sixty-first edition of the Festa do Peão de Barretos, announcing his new work during the Maiara & Maraisa show, in which he sang with them "Coração Embriagado." On 6 September he plays for the first time on television the first single of the album, in the program Música Boa Ao Vivo. 15 September is the time to release the album on the program De Cara, on FM O Dia. On 23 September, Wanessa is interviewed in the program of Jô, where he announces his new album, besides singing the tracks "Coração Embriagado" and "Vai Que Vira Amor". On 5 October she is interviewed in the talk show Programa do Porchat, where she explains the creative process of the album and sings the first single, besides "Perseguição". On 27 January 2017, it was Wanessa's turn to record the Sabadão com Celso Portiolli where he sang several of his old hits and the new single "Coração Embriagado" and released his CD. And on 28 March he participated in the Feast of the Mothers in Minas Gerais with Marília Mendonça and Maiara and Maraísa.

== Critical reception ==
"A mix of country clashes, 33 sounds as artificial and strategic as the singer's return to the sertanejo genre after albums and singles directed to the tracks of electronic music. Besides sounding artificial and strategic, [the album] represents a setback in Wanessa Camargo's (rather irregular) discography."

— Mauro Ferreira music critic of the G1 portal about Wanessa's sertaneja music album.

Professional ratings
Review scores
Source	Rating
Observatório Gay	(Unfavorable)
G1	(Unfavorable)
A Escotilha	1.5/5 stars

The album received negative reviews, being considered "Selling out" and "artificial". Emilio Faustino, from the iG portal, said that by choosing the backwoodsman, Wanessa made a choice "to be convenient if we consider the good phase of the female backwoods in Brazil." He also stated that "During the release of the new album the singer managed to get the heresy of labeling herself as" Camaleoa "(...) if you simply change to make more of it and lean on the success of something that you can not even identify sound of great opportunism and lack of personality." The music critic Mauro Ferreira of the G1 said that the album "besides sounding artificial and strategic, represents a setback in Wanessa's (rather irregular) discography." Renan Guerra, from The Hatch, evaluated the album with a (1.5 / 5), saying that "Wanessa sounds cold during the almost 50 minutes of 33" and that "the whole production of the disc sounds sufficiently cast. It's as if Wanessa were a newcomer, trying to embrace at all costs the lynch of the university sertanejo, even though his music sounds pasteurized and apathetic."

== Track listing ==
33 – Standard edition
No.	Title	Writer(s)	Length
1.	"Só Dá Eu e Você"	Jenner Melo; Juan Marcus; Dayane Camargo; Lara Menzes	2:32
2.	"Choveu Amor"	Paulo Pires; Guilherme Ferraz; Sando Neto; Henrique Batista; Ray Antonio; Diego Ferrari; Everton Mattos	2:41
3.	"Coração Embriagado"	Gabriel Do Cavaco; Diego Ferrari; João Neto; Frederico Nunes; Shylton Fernandes	2:46
4.	"Vai que Vira Amor"	Lari Ferreira; Junior Pepato	2:27
5.	"Vai Mentir Pra Lá"	Paulo Pires; Guilherme Ferraz; Sando Neto; Gustavo Martins; Ray Antonio; Everton Mattos; Diego Ferrari	2:22
6.	"Agora Eu Sei"	Wanessa Camargo; Márcia Araújo; Dayane Camargo; Lara Menzes	2:55
7.	"Não Me Sufoca!"	Paulo Pires; Guilherme Ferraz; Sando Neto; Ray Antonio; Everton Mattos	2:41
8.	"Em Cima do Salto"	Hiago Vinicius; Rick Monteiro; Graciano & Thiago	2:37
9.	"Perseguição"	Victor Hugo; Philipe Pancadinha	3:04
10.	"Se Ainda Tem Amor"	Márcia Araújo; Fred Liel; Débora Xavier	3:00
11.	"Faço Chover"	Juliano Tchula; Michel Alves; Ruan Soares	2:37
12.	"Se Cuida"	Juan Marcus	2:51
13.	"Fora de Mim"	Wanessa Camargo; César Lemos	3:20
14.	"Amor de Conta Gotas"	Elcio Di Carvalho; Lari Ferreira; Junior Pepato; Danillo Dávilla	2:19
15.	"Boquinha de Açúcar"	Wanessa Camargo; Márcia Araújo; Dayane Camargo; Lara Menzes; Bruno Caliman	2:39
Total length:			40:48

33 – Reissue
No.	Title	Writer(s)	Producer(s)	Length
16.	"Eu Quero Ser a Outra (La Otra)"	Karla Aponte; César Lemos	César Lemos	3:22
17.	"Anestesia"	Bruno Caliman; Rafa Torres; Lucas Santos	César Lemos	3:25
Total length:				47:35

33 – Digital download
No.	Title	Length
1.	"Coração Embriagado"	2:46
2.	"Vai que Vira Amor"	2:27
3.	"Vai Mentir Pra Lá"	2:22
4.	"Boquinha de Açúcar"	2:39
5.	"Fora de Mim"	3:20
6.	"Se Cuida"	2:51
7.	"Faço Chover"	2:37
8.	"Se Ainda Tem Amor"	3:00
9.	"Agora Eu Sei"	2:55
10.	"Choveu Amor"	2:41
11.	"Não Me Sufoca"	2:41
12.	"Perseguição"	3:04
13.	"Em Cima do Salto"	2:37
14.	"Só Dá Eu e Você"	2:32
15.	"Amor de Conta Gotas"	2:19
Total length:		40:48

== Release history ==
Region	Date	Format	Label
Brazil	19 August 2016	Digital download (free)	Work Show
Brazil	14 October 2016	Digital download; streaming	Work Show
Brazil	10 March 2017	Relaunch – Digital download; streaming	Som Livre
Brazil	31 March 2017	Relaunch – CD	Som Livre
