= Top 100 Brasil =

Official singles charts in Brazil

Top 100 Brasil, previously Brasil Hot 100 Airplay, is the music singles charts in Brazil, compiled by Crowley Broadcast Analysis. In the beginning, the chart was published monthly by Billboard Brasil since the release of the magazine, in October 2009. Since April 2014, the Brazilian Billboard began publishing on its Brazilian site, the weekly Hot 100, as it is, and has always been held at the site, and Billboard magazine in other countries as well as the American Billboard.

It is the top 100 songs, both national and international titles, the most varied genres, computed based on the total number of executions in the period indicated and the grid base stations Crowley, that monitors 256 radio stations located in the grid-base stations, made from Monday to Friday from 7 am to 7 pm. This grid includes the cities of São Paulo, Rio de Janeiro, Brasília, Campinas, Ribeirão Preto, Belo Horizonte, Curitiba, Porto Alegre, Recife, Salvador, Florianópolis, Fortaleza, Goiânia, Campo Grande, Cuiabá and the Triângulo Mineiro, Vale do Paraíba and Paulista Littoral mesoregions.

In 2018, the company launched the Crowley Charts website, which compiles charts that were released weekly by Billboard Brasil. The site features the Top 100 Brasil, with the top 100 performing songs of the week, and charts with the 10 songs most played by genre (National Pop, International Pop, National Pop/Rock, Pagode, Sertanejo, Forró, Funk/Black Music/Rap, Latin and MPB). In January 2019, Billboard Brasil shut down operations and Crowley Charts subsequently became the only website to release the weekly chart.

The first number one song of the chart was "Halo" by Beyoncé. "I Want to Know What Love Is" by Mariah Carey is the longest running number 1 (27 weeks), followed by Beyoncé's "Halo" (the most played song in the country in 2009).

== List of Billboard Brasil charts achievements and milestones ==
=== Brasil Hot 100 Airplay ===
==== Most weeks at number one ====
- "I Want to Know What Love Is" - Mariah Carey (27 weeks)
- "Escreve aí (Live)" - Luan Santana (17 weeks)
- "Tudo com você" - Victor & Leo (16 weeks)
- "Fly" - Wanessa (12 weeks)
- "Cê topa?" - Luan Santana (12 weeks)
- "Someone like You" - Adele (11 weeks)
- "Talking to the Moon" - Bruno Mars (9 weeks)
- "Halo" - Beyoncé (8 weeks)
- "Cuida bem dela" - Henrique & Juliano (8 weeks)
- "Adrenalina" - Luan Santana (7 weeks)
- "Ai Se Eu Te Pego" - Michel Teló (6 weeks)
- "Zen" - Anitta (6 weeks)
- "We Found Love" - Rihanna featuring Calvin Harris (5 weeks)
- "O tempo não apaga" - Victor & Leo (5 weeks)
- "Suíte 14" - Henrique & Diego featuring MC Guimê (5 weeks)

==== Most number-one hits ====
- Luan Santana (22)
- Beyoncé (5)
- Victor & Leo (3)
- Anitta (3)

==== Most consecutive number-one hits ====
- Beyoncé (4)
- Luan Santana (4)

==== Most cumulative weeks at number one ====
40 - Luan Santana
27 - Mariah Carey
23 - Victor & Leo
14 - Beyoncé
12 - Wanessa
11 - Adele
10 - Henrique & Juliano

=== Brasil Hot Pop ===
==== Most weeks at number one ====
- "I Want to Know What Love Is" - Mariah Carey (27 weeks)
- "Fly" - Wanessa (12 weeks)
- "Loca" - Shakira featuring Dizzee Rascal (9 weeks)
- "Talking to the Moon" - Bruno Mars (9 weeks)
- "Set Fire to the Rain" - Adele (8 weeks)
- "Halo" - Beyoncé (8 weeks)
- "Alejandro" - Lady Gaga (8 weeks)
- "Criminal" - Britney Spears (6 weeks)
- "Teenage Dream" - Katy Perry (5 weeks)
- "Till the World Ends" - Britney Spears (5 weeks)
- "Where Have You Been" - Rihanna (5 weeks)
- "Charlie Brown" - Coldplay (5 weeks)

==== Most number-one hits ====
- Britney Spears (3)
- Adele (3)
- Katy Perry (3)
- Lady Gaga (3)
- Shakira (3)
- Rihanna (3)
- Coldplay (3)
- Selena Gomez (2)

==== Most cumulative weeks at number one ====
27 - Mariah Carey
16 - Rihanna
15 - Shakira
15 - Lady Gaga
13 - Adele
12 - Britney Spears
12 - Wanessa
11 - Beyoncé
10 - Coldplay
9 - Bruno Mars
9 - Katy Perry
8 - Anitta
7 - Black Eyed Peas
7 - Selena Gomez
