= Poetry in Motion =

Poetry in Motion may refer to:

- "Poetry in Motion" (song), a #1 hit song by Johnny Tillotson (1960)
- Poetry in Motion (film), a documentary film (1982)
- Poetry in Motion (arts program), an arts program by the Poetry Society of America (1992)
- Poetry in Motion, a public poetry program by the Writers' Federation of Nova Scotia
- Poetry in Motion, a novel in the High School Musical book series
- Poetry in Motion, a 2017 album by SOJA
- Poetry in Motion, a professional wrestling double-team maneuver
