= Mister Jam =

Brazilian musician and music producer

- Born: 6 November 1980 (age 45); Rio de Janeiro, Brazil
- Origin: Brazil
- Occupation: Musician
- Years active: 1996-present
- Labels: Maxpop Music (2002-2010); JamWorks (2011-2012); Som Livre (2011-2022); Massiva Music (2013-present)
- Website: http://www.jammmusic.com.br/

Fabio Almeida de Oliveira (born 6 November 1980 in Rio de Janeiro), better known as Mister Jam, is a Brazilian music producer, composer, DJ, singer and businessman. He was part of the pop band Mr. Jam between 1996 and 2002 and, after its end, he adopted the stage name for himself in his solo career.

== Career ==
In 1996, Oliveira and his sister, Laura Almeida, started the musical project Mr. Jam. Their first album, New Love Dimension, released by Spotlight Records, featuring the singles "The Shining Light", "Celebration" and "The Way Love Goes". In 1998, the siblings gained reinforcements with members Ricardo Pinda and Dudu Marote, who contributed to the productions, placing the song "Rebola na Boa" as the opening theme for the telenovela Vila Madalena. The second album, the self-titled Mr. Jam, featured another standout track, "Shaka Shaka". In 2001, the band released their third album, Supersônico. In 2002, the band broke up to pursue other individual projects, and Fabio began using the name Mister Jam in his solo career as a producer.

Mister Jam's logo.

In 2002, together with producer Ian Duarte, he founded the record label Maxpop Music, which focused on the electronic music and house music. In 2005 he debuted his solo career with a re-recording of the single "Crusin'". That same year, he produced Kasino's debut album Light of Love.

After four years structuring Maxpop Music to be able to receive other artists, he began producing the debut albums of the group Ramada, in addition to the remix album of Latino, Na Pista Remixes. In 2007 he released a re-recording of his first single, "Celebration", in celebration of his 10 years in the business and, in the same year, released the unreleased "All Together Now", with which he received the award for Best National Producer at the DJ Sound Awards. In 2008 he released the track "Never Stop The Beat".

In 2010, he became responsible for introducing singer Wanessa Camargo to electronic music by releasing the collaboration on "Falling for U" which led to an invitation to produce the artist's extended play Você Não Perde por Esperar, and the album DNA, released the following year. In the same year, he left Maxpop Music, the record label he had founded ten years earlier, and founded JamWorks Music, bringing with him singers such as Kelly Key, Alexa, and Lorena Simpson. In 2011, he also definitively introduced singer Kelly Key, with whom he had started working two years earlier, to house music with the collaboration on the single "O Problema É Meu". In the same year, he produced for singers such as Michel Teló, Luan Santana, Gusttavo Lima, and remixed a song by MPB singer Vanessa da Mata, in addition to releasing his two singles, "Love is Unbound", featuring Eliza G, and "Walkin' On Air (Burn)", added to the soundtrack of the telenovela Fina Estampa. In 2012, he produced the track "Shaking (Party People)" for Kelly Key, her first work in English, and began working on his new single, "Bring On The Nite". In 2013, he released the single Golden People featuring Jacq and King Tef, included in the soundtrack of the Brazilian telenovela Salve Jorge.

In March 2013, he took over the Festa Pan program, which was part of the national programming of Rede Jovem Pan 2 FM, consisting of three mixed sequences containing 15 minutes of open format DJ sets. He remained on the air on Jovem Pan until 2019, when, feeling the format was worn out, he asked to leave it, focusing only on his musical productions and the Massiva label.

In 2020, the label gained prominence with the mission of revealing new talents in national music.

In 2021, the label gained a branch: the electronic arm Massiva Club. The first release included two singles: City Lights with DJ and producer Lazy Bear, which surpassed the mark of 1 million streams, as well as a remix of Bonnie Tyler's 1983 classic Total Eclipse of the Heart, resuming his partnership with Italian singer Eliza G, and producer SaintPaul.

In 2022, Mister Jam achieved a record number of releases in his career as a producer and DJ, remixing Brazilian artists for Sony Music, including Gusttavo Lima, Henrique & Juliano, Dilsinho, and Felipe Araújo. In addition to those remixes, Mister Jam released monthly singles from his projects, such as "Let Ü Go", in collaboration with REDÜKT and influencer Ághata Félix; as well as the songs "Bills" and "100 Days", with DJs Paxxo and singer Francine Môh; a remix of Blondie's 1978 hit "Heart Of Glass" with the band Rod Hanna; "Heaven" in collaboration with Lazy Bear; "New Day" with DJ Duda Santtos; a cover of Eric Prydz's 2004 song "Call On Me"; "Ring Ring" in collaboration with English singer Bellsavvy; "My Planet" in collaboration with DJ Dot Larissa; and in December he released a remix of Mariah Carey's classic Christmas song "All I Want For Christmas Is You", resuming the partnership with Eliza G and Saintpaul DJ.

Later that same year, Mister Jam returned to the airwaves on Rede Jovem Pan FM, hosting a special edition of the Planeta DJ program on Fridays.

He reunited with his musical partner, Ian Duarte, for a new version of the Kasino project. Together they released the singles Get Down and Party Non-Stop and are preparing a new EP for the project in 2023.
