= Wanessa Camargo =

Brazilian singer-songwriter

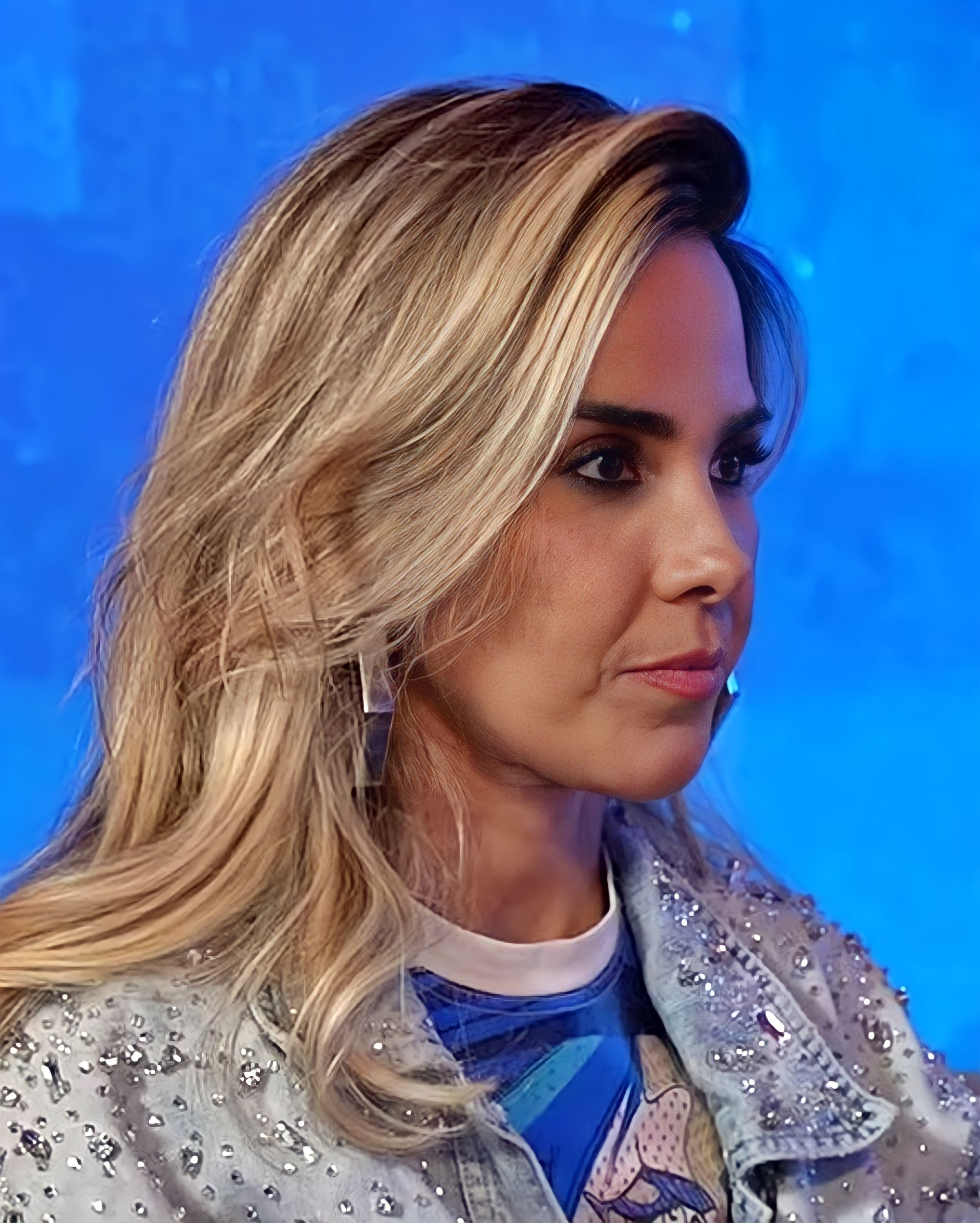
- Camargo in September 2024

Background information
- Born: Wanessa Godói Camargo; 28 December 1982 (age 43); Goiânia, Goiás, Brazil
- Genres: Pop; electro; sertanejo; R&B
- Occupations: Singer; songwriter
- Instruments: Vocals; piano
- Years active: 2000–present
- Labels: Sony BMG; Sony Music; Som Livre
- Website: wanessacamargo.com.br

Wanessa Godói Camargo (born 28 December 1982) is a Brazilian singer-songwriter.

== Early life ==
Camargo is the daughter of Brazilian sertanejo singer Zezé Di Camargo, from the duo Zezé Di Camargo & Luciano, and businesswoman Zilú Godói. Her father worked on the Brazilian version of the musical Cats and was part of the group of dancers known as Zezé Di Camargo and Luciano.

== Biography ==
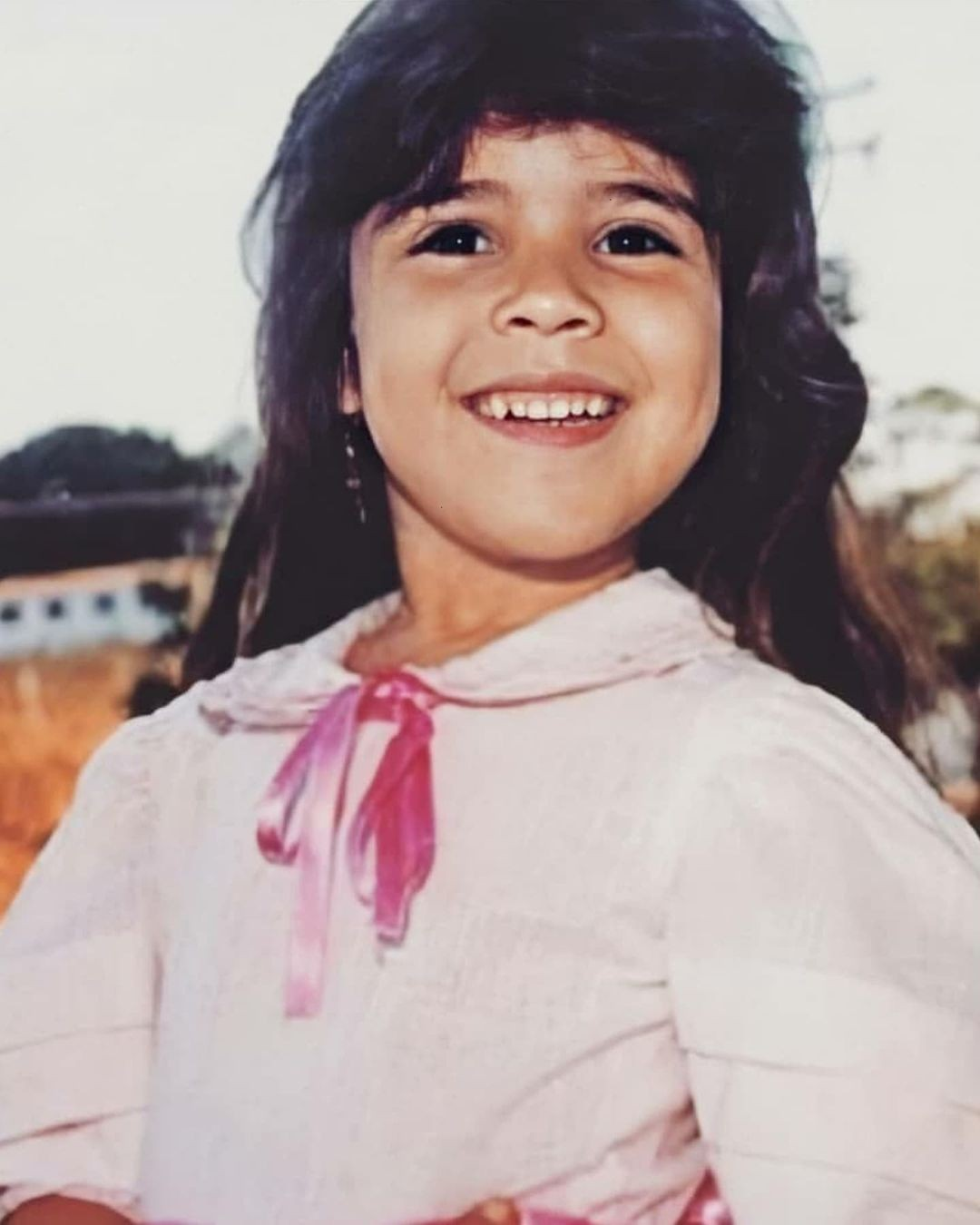
Camargo in 1987

Wanessa was born in Goiânia, Goiás, on 28 December 1982. She is the daughter of the Brazilian sertanejo singer Zezé Di Camargo from the duo Zezé Di Camargo & Luciano and of the businesswoman Zilú Godói. She attended public schools during her childhood, but she had no toys because of the financial difficulties of her family.

In 1991, at 9 years old, she moved to São Paulo when her father and her uncle Luciano Camargo went in search of success. In 1992, she was enrolled in a private school, but suffered prejudice from colleagues and employees because of her social class.

During an interview for Veja, Wanessa said: "The principal of the school was always insinuating that we would not pay the college. She humiliated us, but I was so insecure that I never told this to my parents, and even that was a mockery. Once, to make me happy, my father took a borrowed lance just to give me the taste of going to the car class."

Also in 1991, she started a band with her three friends Kiko, Leandro and Bruno, who in the future would form the group KLB. The boys played the instruments and Wanessa was the lead singer. The band's first name was The Fenders, a reference to the guitar brand. They then changed their name to Neon and started performing at clubs and parties with versions of songs by Xuxa and Leandro & Leonardo.

In 1993, at the age of ten, Wanessa began to study theater, ballet and tap dance, and over time learnt street dance. As an adolescent, she began to do gymnastics and artistic gymnastics to gain physical fitness when dancing. In 1995, she had her first theater role in the musical Cats. In 1996, she began to integrate the body of dancers of the duo Zezé Di Camargo and Luciano.

== Career ==
=== 2000–02: First albums ===
Camargo recorded a demo CD in 1999 which led to her signing to the BMG Brasil record label in 2000. Her debut single, "O Amor Não Deixa (Love Won't Let Me)" was released on 11 November 2000, followed by her debut album Wanessa Camargo on 12 December 2000, composed of country pop love songs. Her self-titled debut album was recorded between Nashville and Miami, where she resided at the time. Five songs in the album were originally written in English but adapted to Portuguese, including a cover of Faith Hill's "Breathe", and the debut single, which was later re-recorded by country singer Tammy Cochran.

The follow-up single "Apaixonada por Você" was released on 12 February 2001, and was included on the soundtrack of the Brazilian soap opera Um Anjo Caiu do Céu, with radios being served a slow tempo country remix. New pressings of the album included the remixed version of the song, titled "Um Anjo Caiu do Céu version". The third and final single, Eu Posso Te Sentir (Breathe), was released on 30 July 2001.

In 2001, Camargo made her acting debut as the fairy Honey Mel in the children's film Xuxa e os Duendes. She recorded the track "Tudo Que Você Sonhar" for its soundtrack. On 25 October, she released the first single from her second album, "Eu Quero Ser o Seu Amor", which marked a transition to a pop rock style with a music video inspired by video games and Japanese comics.

On 9 November, her sophomore album was released, also titled Wanessa Camargo. On 21 February 2002, the second single "Tanta Saudade" was released, featuring backing vocals from her father, country singer Zezé Di Camargo. "Gostar de Mim" was released as the third and final single from the album. In July, she recorded the short film Socialmente Correto with Oscar Magrini; however, the project was canceled.

In September, she recorded Jovens Tardes, a special TV show on the Globo Network. This saw her work again with KLB, as well as with the sertanejo duo Pedro and Thiago and the singer Fael Mondego. This aired from October and featured the presenters playing songs with their respective original artists.

On 30 November 2002, Wanessa released the single "Um Dia ... Meu Primeiro Amor", followed on 2 December by her third eponymous album. On 22 February 2003, she released the pop rock single "Sem Querer", accompanied by a music video with Erik Marmo. The last single of the album, "Filme de Amor", was chosen after a vote on the singer's website, the other option being "Paga Pra Ver (Tô Pagando Pra Ver)".

=== 2003–04: Transparente and television ===
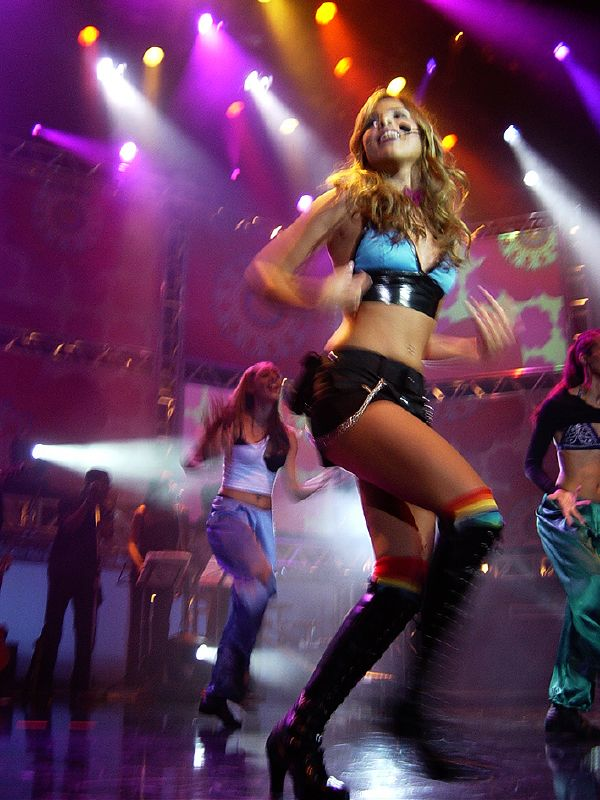
Wanessa performing in 2003

In March 2003, following the good reception of the previous year's TV special, Jovens Tardes became a regular part of Globo Network Sunday's afternoon schedule. Wanessa appeared alongside the same co-presenters, with the addition of Luiza Possi. Each program focused on a different musical theme, such as rock, film classics and soap opera themes, with special guests playing the music.

Wanessa was due to appear in the short film S.O.S Cupido, but the project was never recorded.

On 20 September, she recorded her first DVD in Rio de Janeiro. She sought to present a more adult image by wearing more sensual clothes, dying her hair red with bangs, posing semi-naked for VIP magazine, and giving interviews on sex and taboo subjects.

On 11 January 2004, the Jovens Tardes project ended after the producer Marlene Mattos left the station. Mattos then signed with another station, Rede Bandeirantes, and invited Wanessa to host a show with the same format. She declined, wishing instead to focus on music. In February, she joined the main cast of the fourth season of the fifth version of the adaption of the children's book Sítio do Picapau Amarelo, in which she played the rock star Diana Dechamps. On 12 March, she released her new single, "Me Engana que I Gosto", a version of "Miénteme" by the Puerto Rican singer Olga Tañón.

On 24 May, she released her first live album, Transparente Ao Vivo, which featured four new songs and previous hits. In July, she made appeared in the children's film Cine Gibi, adapted from the Monica's Gang comic books.

On 12 October, she released the second single from her live album, "Metade de Mim" and appeared naked in the music video. In December, she starred in the second season of the reality show Quebrando a Rotina, travelling in a trailer with Felipe Dylon and the host Luciano Huck between the south coast of Rio de Janeiro and the north coast of São Paulo. She and Dylon recorded the song "Amor de Praia" at the end of the season. In 2005 she appeared in another reality show, Subindo a Serra with Huck, Dylon, Karina Bacchi, Preta Gil and Popó, documenting their trip to Teresópolis in Rio de Janeiro.

=== 2005–09: W, Total and Meu Momento ===
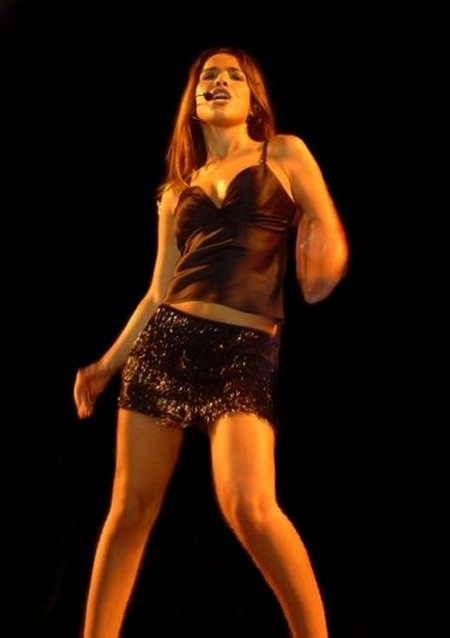
Wanessa sings "Meu Menino" on W in Tour... Era Uma Vez in 2006.

On 11 June 2005, Wanessa released the single "Amor, Amor", in a Latin pop style comparable to the music of Colombian singer Shakira.

On 8 August, she released her fourth studio album, W, which lacked the country elements of her previous albums and focused on pop and pop rock. She composed ten of the fifteen songs, her most substantial songwriting contribution so far. The album was well received by critics, who noted its maturity and originality.

On 10 January 2006, the second single, "Não Resisto a Nós Dois" was released; it became the seventh most played song on Brazilian radio that year. In February, she premiered the W in Tour ... Era Uma Vez, her biggest tour. Inspired by Broadway musicals, it was directed by theatre diva Marília Pêra and featured five acts and costume changes.

On 22 August, the third single from W, "Louca", was released, having been chosen by the public through a website vote.

After spending a year working on a new album, Wanessa released the single "Não Tô Pronta Pra Perdoar" on 2 August 2007; it was a version of the song "Not Ready to Make Nice" by Dixie Chicks. On 21 August, she released her fifth studio album, Total, which sold 100,000 copies.

In April, her Total Tour began at Citibank Hall in São Paulo. She also worked with the Mexican band Camila on a Portuguese language version of "Abrázame".

In 2009, she changed her musical style again and began to use her first name Wanessa only. Her single "Fly" saw her collaborate with the rapper Ja Rule. On 1 June, she released her the sixth studio album Meu Momento, featuring collaborations with Rita Lee and Alexandre Carlo and showing R&B and urban musical influences. The second single, "Não Me Leve a Mal", was chosen by a Twitter and was released on 28 September. Despite high expectations and a large budget, which included opening for some of Beyoncé's shows in Brazil, the album sold only 20,000 copies.

=== 2010–15: DNA and DNA Tour ===
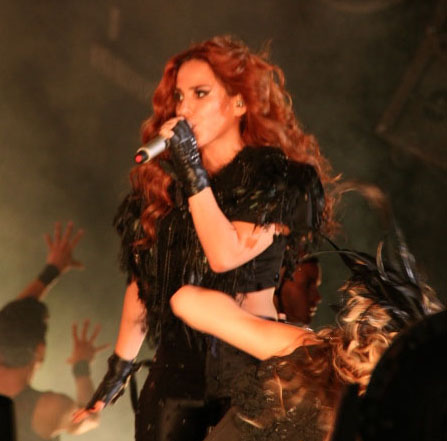
Wanessa during the DNA Tour in 2013

In 2010, she changed musical direction again, inspired by Lady Gaga and The Black Eyed Peas to embrace electronic music .

On 1 July, Wanessa provided vocals for the track "Falling for U" by DJ Mister Jam. On 9 September, she released the first single from her forthcoming work, "Worth It", a version of "Beautiful Encounter (Yan Yu)" by Elva Hsiao. Two days later her first EP, Você não Perde por Esperar, sold through a music ticket – a magnetic card from which the buyer entered a code into her website to download the songs. On 31 March she released the single "Stuck On Repeat".

On 5 July 2011, she released the single "Sticky Dough" in collaboration with the American rapper Bam Bam. In the same month, she released her seventh studio album, DNA, recorded in English and produced by Mister Jam. Its promotion was interrupted by the announcement of Wanessa's pregnancy.

The title track "DNA" was released as a second single on 24 October. A third single, "Get Loud!", was released on 26 June 2012 after the singer returned from maternity leave. On 1 December 2012, she released "Hair & Soul" with a music video sponsored by Wella. In April 2013, she released the single "Shine It On" and the live album DNA Tour. This was followed in June by the single "Amor, Amor", and in November by "Turn It Up", which featured the rapper Soulja Boy. In June 2015, she began the W15 Tour, celebrating 15 years of her career.

=== 2016–17: Reformulation and 33 ===
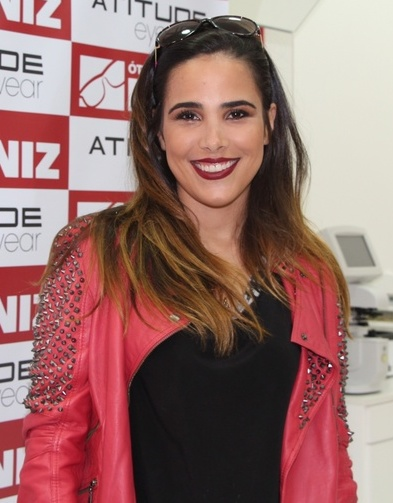
Wanessa at an event in 2015

In early 2016, she began recording her eighth studio album with a more commercial pop style and Portuguese lyrics. It was to be produced by Mister Jam and César Lemos. She also announced that she was returning to using the surname Camargo after 8 years.

On 17 May, she announced that she had shelved the material she was recording and changed the producer team to make a redirection in her career and a move towards sertanejo music. She re-recorded the album with Eduardo Pepato as producer, explaining: "The way of pop I do not identify myself, it is not my beach, my footprint is romanticism and the sertanejo is a strong mark of my I'm doing what I believe."

She left her contract with Sony Music and signed with Work Show, known for its sertanejo releases. On 26 July, she released the first single from the album, "Coração Embriagado"; this reached number 19 on Billboard Brasil, the best result of her career until then. "Vai que Vira Amor" was released as a promotional single on 26 August. On 19 August she released her eighth studio album, titled 33. The work received harsh criticism, with critics labelling her a sell-out "without musical identity".

== Musical characteristics ==
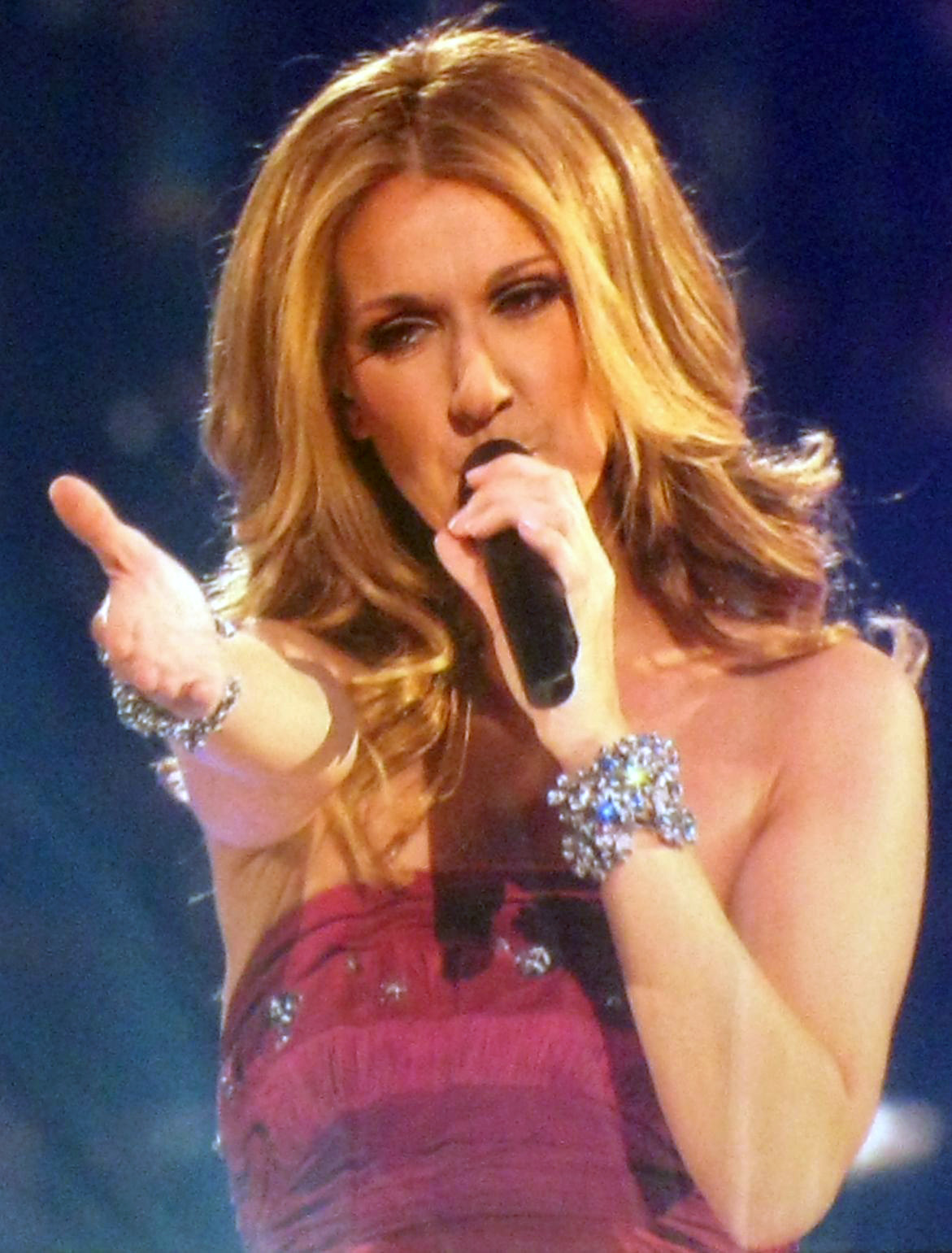
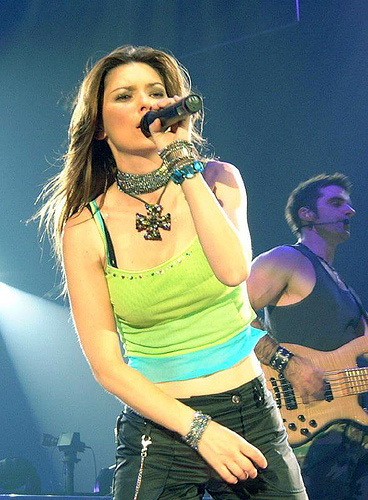
Celine Dion (left) and Shania Twain (right) are two of Wanessa's main influences.

=== Influences ===
Wanessa has cited Celine Dion, Shania Twain and Mariah Carey as three of her great references. In her early albums, she sought inspiration from country pop artists, noting Twain as well as Dixie Chicks and Faith Hill; she has covered the songs "Not Ready to Make Nice" and "Breathe" by the latter two artists. She performed with her father on the Pai e Filha Tuor and sang several songs by artists who influenced her, including "From This Moment On" and "You're Still the One" by Twain. Another artist cited as important in her development is Rita Lee, with whom she re-recorded the track "Coisas da Vida" for the album Meu Momento.

In 2005, as she moved to a pop music style, she cited influences such as Christina Aguilera, Shakira, Michael Jackson and Madonna (noting that her favorite Madonna songs were "Like a Prayer" and "La Isla Bonita").

In 2010, during an interview with Kboing, she cited Jay-Z, Alicia Keys, Beyoncé, Lauryn Hill, and Lady Gaga as influences. In 2016, during an interview for the Programa do Porchat, she mentioned other women of the genre, such as Paula Fernandes, Maiara and Maraisa, Marília Mendonça and Naiara Azevedo, as references for the new phase of the career in sertanejo.

=== Musical style ===
Wanessa's earlier career encompassed country pop, pop music and dance-pop. She also recorded songs in genres such as pop rock ("Sem Querer", "Não Resisto a Nós Dois"), reggaeton ("Me Engana que Eu Gosto", "Amor Amor"), forró ("Me Pega de Jeito"), dubstep ("Sticky Dougth"), arrocha ("Vai Que Vira Amor") and R&B ("Fly", "Não Me Leve a Mal").

In an interview in 2013, she said that she has always tried to keep Brazilian elements in her songs, for example funk carioca from Rio in "Sticky Dough."

She set aside her usual musical styles on the album DNA in 2011, which featured EDM, electronic and electropop and was recorded entirely in English.

In 2016, she began to record in the sertanejo genre.

=== Voice ===
Wanessa has a mezzo-soprano voice with a range of 3.2 octaves. In the songs "Não Me Leve a Mal" and "Eu Estarei Aqui", she holds a note for 16 seconds.

== Personal life ==
In 1998, at age 16, she was the initial target of a kidnapping; the kidnappers accidentally took her uncle Welington Camargo instead and sent the family a piece of his ear, and the incident became a national story. Soon after, even though she was protected by security, she suffered a new attack when her school was robbed. After that attack, her family moved to the city of Plantation, Florida, United States for a year, to protect her from future attacks.

In 1998, during adolescence, Wanessa dated the singer Leandro Scornavacca, a member of KLB. The relationship ended a year later when she moved to the United States. In 2000 she began a relationship with the actor Dado Dolabella, which lasted until 2002. In 2003 she had brief relationships with the actor Erik Marmo and with the singers Felipe Dylon and Rogério Flausino. In 2004 also she dated the actor Rodrigo Prado for six months.

In 2003 Wanessa revealed in an interview for Veja magazine that she had not been a virgin for some time. Her parents did not know this and, days later, her father was surprised by the news in an interview.

In 2005 she met Marcus Buaiz, businessman from Espírito Santo, and the couple married on 26 May 2007. On 18 June 2011 she announced her first pregnancy during an interview for the magazine Contigo!. José Marcus was born on 5 January 2012. In December 2013 she announced she was pregnant again. Her second son, João Francisco, was born on 19 June 2014. She is a São Paulo FC fan.

== Activism ==
Wanessa is an ambassador for the NGO Fundação SOS Mata Atlântica, which is fighting for the preservation of the Atlantic Forest. Due to her efforts to promote the NGO and its goals, and her work for the clean-up of the Tietê River in São Paulo, she was awarded the 2007 Pro-Social Prize at the My Nick Awards event. She also received the title of Personality of the Year and JK Jewel from Cicesp. In 2012, she donated a fee of $150,000 from an advertisement to Unicef.

In 2014, she donated a $50,000 fee from Caras magazine towards social projects. She also put on a virtual fundraising show as part of a fundraising campaign for a boy named Ryan, who suffers from Ondine syndrome. In December 2015, Wanessa was appointed a UN ambassador, committing herself to UNAIDS actions in response to HIV and discrimination.

=== LGBT advocacy ===
In 2009, Wanessa became involved in LGBT causes and the fight for equal rights for all: "Every human being has the option of loving whoever he or she wants, regardless of their sexual choice. I think it's great, I do not see anything against being against people who make love, is ridiculous. It is a posture of society that no longer fits in today's time." In 2011 and 2015, Wanessa performed at the 15th São Paulo Gay Pride Parade for audiences of 1 million people.

After having her first child with businessman Marcus Buaiz, the singer was asked how she would react if her son was gay: "I look the best I can." In 2013, she celebrated on social media the approval of law 4277, which recognized same-sex marriage in Brazil and has criticized Marco Feliciano's 'Gay Cure' project.

In 2015, Wanessa criticized opposition to adoption by homosexual couples: "A human being who says in the name of God that it is better for a child to be abandoned than to have two parents can not speak in the name of God. A lack of education and prejudice dictate what you are. God is in our hearts, in our actions, in the love of our neighbor, in compassion; love is God, love is greater than everything."

== Discography ==
- Wanessa Camargo (2000)
- Wanessa Camargo (2001)
- Wanessa Camargo (2002)
- W (2005)
- Total (2007)
- Meu Momento (2009)
- DNA (2011)
- 33 (2017)
- Universo Invertido (2020)
- Pai & Filha (with Zezé di Camargo) (2021)
- Livre (2023)

== Filmography ==
Television
Year	Title	Role	Notes
2002–2004	Jovens Tardes	TV host	
2004	Sítio do Picapau Amarelo	Diana Dechamps	Season 4
2004	Quebrando a Rotina	Contestant	Season 2
2005	Subindo a Serra	Contestant	Season 1
2008	High School Musical: A Seleção	Coach / Mentor	Episode: "Desafio das Duplas"
2012	Cheias de Charme	Herself	Episode: "September 6, 2012"
2013	Fábrica de Estrelas	Herself	Episode: "Segunda Etapa para Seleção da Nova Girl Band"
2014	Domingo da Gente	TV host	Episode: "January 26, 2014"
2015	Hora do Faro	TV host	Episode: "October 18, 2015"
2015	Peladão a Bordo	Coach / Mentor	Episode: "November 17, 2015"
2017–2018	Popstar	Coach / Mentor	Episode: "August 13, 2017" Episode: "October 28, 2017"
2018	Dra. Darci	Leandra	Episode: "A Concorrente"
2020	Wanessa em Terras Capixabas	TV Host	
2020	Wanessa feat. Espírito Santo	TV Host	
2021	Show dos Famosos	Contestant	Season 4, 2nd place
2021	É o Amor: Família Camargo	Herself	Documentary
2022	Wanessa Sunset	TV Host	
2024	Big Brother Brasil	Herself (Housemate)	Season 24

Film
Year	Title	Role	Notes
2001	Xuxa e os Duendes	Fairy Mel	
2004	Cine Gibi	Herself	
2010	High School Musical: O Desafio	Herself	
2016	Sing	Ash	Brazilian Dubbing
2021	Sing 2	Ash	Brazilian Dubbing

Web
Year	Title	Role	Notes
2009	Dossiê Wanessa	Herself	Web-documentary.

== Concerts ==
=== Tours ===
- Apaixonada Tour (2001–2002)
- Turnê Olympia (2003)
- Transparente Tour (2003–04)
- W in Tour... Era Uma Vez (2006–2007)
- Total Tour (2008–09)
- Meu Momento Tour (2009–10)
- DNA Tour (2012–15)
- 33 Tour (2016–18)
- Wanessa Camargo Tour (2018)

=== Promotional ===
- Pai e Filha (2007) (with Zezé Di Camargo)
- Turnê Balada (2010–2011)
- W15 Tour (2015)
