= Mr. Jam =

Brazilian pop music group

Mr.Jam
- Origin: Rio de Janeiro, RJ, Brazil
- Genres: Pop music, Dance music and Eurodance
- Years active: 1996-2002
- Labels: Spotlight Records (1996-1997), Sony Music (1998-2002)
- Past members: Fabio Almeida: Laura Almeida; Rodrigo Santo Anastacio; Edu Braga

Mr. Jam was a Brazilian pop music group formed in Rio de Janeiro in 1996. Originally, it was formed by siblings Laura Almeida and Fabio Almeida and their two high school friends: Rodrigo Santo Anastácio (guitar) and Edu Braga (bass).

== Career ==
In 1996, siblings Fabianno and Laura Almeida decided to start a musical project, calling it Mr. Jam. Their first album was titled New Love Dimension, by the label Spotlight Records, and featured the singles "Celebration", "The Way Love Goes" and "The Shining Light". In 1998, the brothers were joined by members Ricardo Pinda and Dudu Marote, who contributed to the productions, including the song "Rebola na Boa" in the opening of the soap opera Vila Madalena, on Rede Globo. Their second album, the eponymous Mr. Jam, featured another notable track, "Shaka Shaka". In 2001, the band released their third album, called Supersônico. In 2002, the band disbanded, focusing on other individual projects, and Fabianno went on to sign as Mister Jam in his solo career as a producer.

== Discography ==
Studio Albums
Album List	Album Details
New Love Dimension	Released: 18 February 1996; Formats: CD; Label: Spotlight Records
Mr. Jam	Released: 14 April 1998; Formats: CD; Label: Sony Music, Dance Pool
Supersonico	Released: 15 November 2001; Formats: CD; Label: Sony Music, Dance Pool

=== Singles ===
List of singles
Title	Year	Album
"Celebration"	1996	New Love Dimension
"The Shining Light"	1996	New Love Dimension
"The Way Love Goes"	1997	New Love Dimension
"Rebola na Boa"	1999	Mr. Jam
"Shaka Shaka"	1999	Mr. Jam
"Disco Voador"	2001	Supersonico
"O Que Vier"	2001	Supersonico
