= High School Musical: el desafío =

High School Musical: El Desafío may refer to:

- High School Musical: el desafío (2008 Argentine film)
- High School Musical: el desafío (2008 Mexican film)

== See also ==
- High School Musical (disambiguation)
- High School Musical: O Desafio, the 2010 Brazilian production
