= Wanessa Camargo (2000 album) =

Studio album by Wanessa Camargo
- Released: November 15, 2000
- Recorded: 2000
- Genres: Country pop; teen pop
- Length: 62:31
- Languages: Portuguese; English
- Label: Sony BMG
- Producer: Jason Deere

Wanessa Camargo chronology
Wanessa Camargo (2000)	Wanessa Camargo (2001)

Singles from Wanessa Camargo
- 1. "O Amor Não Deixa (Love Won't Let Me)" Released: October 11, 2000; 2. "Apaixonada Por Você" Released: March 23, 2001; 3. "Eu Posso Te Sentir (Breathe)" Released: July 30, 2001

Wanessa Camargo is the debut album by Brazilian singer Wanessa Camargo, released on November 15, 2000. The album sold about 250,000 copies in Brazil, and was certified gold by Associação Brasileira dos Produtores de Discos (ABPD). Originally the album had 15 tracks. Later, it was re-released with a new version for the song "Apaixonada Por Você" (meaning in English: "In love with you"), which was used for the Brazilian soap opera Um Anjo Caiu do Céu (meaning in English: "An angel fell from the sky"). The album includes the hit single "O Amor Não Deixa" (in English: Love Won't Let Me).

== Production ==
The album brings compositions of well-known figures of Brazilian music, like Fernanda Takai, Patrícia Coelho, and Wanessa. The original version of the album contained only 15 songs. When Wanessa was invited to take part in the soundtrack of the novela Um Anjo Caiu do Céu, the song "Apaixonada Por Você", originally a dance pop, was re-recorded as a romantic ballad and with significant changes from the original version. Thus, the CD was later re-released, bringing the new version of "Apaixonada Por Você" to be the second bonus track of the album.

== Track listing ==
Wanessa Camargo – Standard edition
No.	Title	Writer(s)	Length
1.	"O Amor Não Deixa (Love Won't Let Me)"	Jason Deere; Franne Golde; Kasey Livingston; César Lemos	3:43
2.	"Deixa Pra Lá"	Ricardo Fiúza; Fernanda Takai; Mário PC	4:05
3.	"Eu Sei (Stay)"	Deere; James Westbrook; Karen Childers; Phillip Sweet; Kimberly Roads; Silvio Richetto; Grace Barci	3:29
4.	"Apaixonada por Você"	Juno; Zezé Di Camargo	3:48
5.	"Girassóis"	Fernando Carvalho; Nilson Chaves	3:27
6.	"A Mulher em Mim (Underneath)"	Bonnie Baker; Deere; Kim Keyes; Paulo Bethencourt; Lemos	3:56
7.	"Fuga"	Patrícia Coelho; Emerson Villarri; Jairzinho Oliveira	4:08
8.	"A Força da Paixão"	Gilson; Tivas	3:15
9.	"Educação Sentimental II"	Herbert Vianna; Paula Toller; Leoni	4:18
10.	"Eu Posso Te Sentir (Breathe)"	Holly Lamar; Stephanie Bentley; Dudu Falcão	4:09
11.	"Eu Nasci pra Amar Você (Born to Give My Love to You)"	Pat Bunch; Pam Rose; Mary Ann Kennedy; Zezé Di Camargo; Wanessa Camargo	3:21
12.	"Só Sei Amar Você"	Wanessa Camargo; Álvaro Socci; Cláudio Matta	4:14
13.	"Antes e Depois de Você"	Lemos; Karla Aponte	4:31
14.	"Amanhecer em Mim (Amaneciendo en Ti)"	Alfredo Matheus; Falcão	3:59
15.	"Love Won't Let Me" (Bonus track)	Deere; Golde; Livingston	3:44
16.	"Apaixonada Por Você (version Um Anjo Caiu do Céu)" (Bonus track)	Juno; Zezé Di Camargo	3:52
Total length:			40:48

== Certifications ==
Region	Certification	Certified units/sales
Brazil (Pro-Música Brasil)	Gold	250,000
