= High School Musical: Get in the Picture =

- High School Musical: Get in the Picture print advertisement, made by BLT & Associates
- Created by: BBC Worldwide
- Directed by: Tony Sacco; Michael Dempsey
- Presented by: Nick Lachey
- Starring: Sammi Hanratty; Madeline Carroll; Vanessa Hudgens; Ashley Tisdale; Monique Coleman; Nick Lachey; Alberto Ornelas; Kenan Doğulu
- Composers: Jeff Lippencott and Mark T. Williams, Ah2 Music
- Country of origin: United States
- No. of seasons: 1
- No. of episodes: 11

Production
- Executive producers: Jay Blumenfield; Tony Marsh; John Hesling
- Producers: Arrisen Towner; Robert Dewberry; Jeff Anderson; Derek Wan; Shelley Sinha; Shauna Thomas; Shyne Shnapier; Josh Figgs; Noah Mark
- Editors: Brian York; Jason Cherella; Steve Mellon; Steven Simone-Friedland; Nena Erb; Travis Greene; Hilary Scratch; Trevor Baierl; Carol Carimi; Raiko Siems; Ann Faucher; Patrick Fraser; Karin Hoving
- Production companies: The Jay & Tony Show; BBC Worldwide

Original release
- Network: ABC
- Release: July 20 – September 8, 2008

High School Musical: Get in the Picture is a reality television series, which debuted July 20, 2008 on the television channel ABC. Stan Carrizosa was named the winner on September 8, 2008. Tierney Chamberlain was the runner-up.

The series is a spin-off of the popular Disney High School Musical franchise. Nick Lachey is the series host. The Faculty were Jen Malenke, Regina Williams, Tiana Brown, Rob Adler, Chris Prinzo, and Montre Burton. Guest appearances and finale judging by Kenny Ortega. The show conducted a nationwide talent hunt followed by a group of contestants undergoing training to hone their skills.

== Grand prize ==
A record contract with Disney, and a music video to an original song, "Just Gettin' Started" to be shown during the credits of High School Musical 3: Senior Year. The contestants who did not advance made up the Chorus and were allowed to be backup singers/dancers in the music video.

== Taping locations ==
Get in the Picture was taped at Murray High School in Murray, Utah. Murray High School was the venue used for the auditorium scene of High School Musical, as well as other films Read It and Weep, Take Down, and Minutemen. It is also the high school of American Idol runner-up David Archuleta. Taping also took place at a Kmart store in Draper, Utah. The finale was taped at the Pasadena Civic Auditorium in Pasadena, California.

== Ratings ==
While the franchise may have had a built-in audience, the Nielsen ratings were surprisingly low, and the show was considered a major disappointment for the summer 2008 season by the entertainment media. Besides being topped by reruns of sitcoms on CBS and Deal or No Deal encores along with the 2008 Summer Olympics on NBC, and many weeks by various repeats from Fox, the series was also constantly outrated in the 18-49 demo by the Spanish language telenovela Al Diablo con los Guapos on Univision; the telenovela beat HSM: Get in the Picture on five consecutive Mondays (August 11 through September 8) in the overall ratings those weeks.

Additionally in August, in markets where a pre-season edition of NFL Monday Night Football on ESPN aired over a broadcast station, the show was either pre-empted or delayed until a later time or date on the local ABC affiliate (which is usually the default station which takes ESPN simulcasts). The finale also suffered the same fate on September 8 within the Twin Cities of Minnesota, Green Bay & Milwaukee markets for the early portion of the Monday Night Football regular season premiere doubleheader.

== Top 12 contestants ==
Name	Hometown	Status
Stan Carrizosa	Visalia, California	Winner
Tierney Chamberlain	Madison, Wisconsin	2nd Place
Isaiah Smith	Pittsburgh, Pennsylvania	3rd Place
Christina Brown	Nanakuli, Hawaii	4th Place
James Wolpert	Strasburg, Pennsylvania	Chorus
TJ Wilkins	Los Angeles, California	Chorus
Shayna Goldstein	Denver, Colorado	Chorus
Bailey Purvis	Baton Rouge, Louisiana	Chorus
Ether Saure	Lincoln, Nebraska	Chorus
Anthony Acito	Quincy, Massachusetts	Chorus
Christie Brooke	Kaʻaʻawa, Hawaii	Chorus
Briana Vega	Winter Springs, Florida	Chorus
Tony, John, Jessalyn, Ciara, Sean, Britney, Madison, and Lauren Diaz*	Unknown	OUT

*Tony, John, Jessalyn, Ciara, Sean, Britney, Madison and Lauren were eliminated in the semi-finals, so no further information on them was released, including their last names and their hometown. Also, since they were eliminated in the semi-finals, unlike the other eliminated contestants, were not sent to the chorus, instead just sent home.

== Performances ==
Eastern Finals

Song	"Torn"
Artist	Natalie Imbruglia
Performers	James and Tierney

Song	"Leave the Pieces"
Artist	The Wreckers
Performers	Briana and Tony

Song	"I Want It That Way"
Artist	The Backstreet Boys
Performers	Bailey and John

Song	"Bubbly"
Artist	Colbie Caillat
Performers	Anthony and Jessalyn

Song	"Change the World"
Artist	Eric Clapton
Performers	Isaiah and Ciara

Eliminated : Ciara, Jessalyn, John, and Tony

Western Finals

Song	"Everything"
Artist	Michael Buble
Performers	Stan and Christina

Song	"You'll Think of Me"
Artist	Keith Urban
Performers	Shayna and TJ

Song	"Hold My Hand"
Artist	Hootie and the Blowfish
Performers	Ether and Lauren

Song	"Vacation"
Artist	The Go-Go's
Performers	Christie and Madison

Song	"Inside Out"
Artist	Eve 6
Performers	Britney and Sean

Eliminated : Sean, Britney, Madison, and Lauren

Top 12

Song	"Unwritten"
Artist	Natasha Bedingfield
Performers	Tierney, Stan, and Isaiah

Song	"There's Always Someone Cooler Than You"
Artist	Ben Folds Five
Performers	Bailey, Anthony, and Christie

Song	"The Remedy"
Artist	Jason Mraz
Performers	Ether, Shayna, and James

Song	"Man in the Mirror"
Artist	Michael Jackson
Performers	TJ, Christina, and Briana

Send to the chorus : Christie and Briana
Best Performer : Tierney

Top 10

Song	"Bleeding Love"
Artist	Leona Lewis
Performers	James and Bailey

Song	"Austin"
Artist	Blake Shelton
Performers	Shayna and Stan

Song	"Boston"
Artist	Augustana
Performers	Isaiah and Christina

Song	"I Don't Wanna Be"
Artist	Gavin DeGraw
Performers	TJ and Anthony

Song	"One Year, Six Months"
Artist	Yellowcard
Performers	Tierney and Ether

Send to chorus : Anthony and Ether
Best Performer: Isaiah

Top 8

Song	"Welcome to My Life" and "It's All Been Done"
Artist	Simple Plan and Barenaked Ladies
Performers	James, Christina, Tierney, Isaiah, TJ, Stan, Shayna, and Bailey

Send to chorus : Shayna and Bailey
Best Performer: Tierney

Top 6

Song	TV Themes Medley: "One Day at a Time" / "Mary Tyler Moore" / "Greatest American Hero" / "Cheers"
Artist	Various
Performers	James, Christina, Tierney, Isaiah, TJ, and Stan

Send to chorus : TJ
Best Performer: Christina

Top 5

Song	Songs from the 1980s Medley: "Holding Out for a Hero" / "We Belong" / "Every Little Thing She Does is Magic" / "It Must Be Love" / "Jessie's Girl" / "Never Gonna Give You Up"
Artist	Bonnie Tyler / Pat Benatar / The Police / Madness / Rick Springfield / Rick Astley
Performers	James, Christina, Tierney, Isaiah, and Stan

Send to chorus : James
Best Performer: Isaiah

Top 4

Song	High School Musical Medley: "Breakin' Free" / "Work This Out" / "We're All in This Together" / "You are the Music in Me"
Artist	High School Musical 1 & 2
Performers	Christina, Tierney, Stan, and Isaiah

Send to chorus : Christina
Best Performer: not announced (but Stan's name was read first)

Top 3

Song	"I Don't Want to Miss a Thing"
Artist	Aerosmith
Performers	Stan

Song	"Somewhere Over the Rainbow"
Artist	Judy Garland (Wizard of Oz)
Performers	Tierney

Song	"Live Like You Were Dying"
Artist	Tim McGraw
Performers	Isaiah

Send to chorus : Isaiah
Best Performer: not announced (but Tierney's name was read first)

Top 2

Song	"Just Getting Started"
Artist	High School Musical 3 Soundtrack
Performers	Stan and Tierney

Send to chorus : Tierney
Best Performer: Stan (WINNER)

Voted Most Growth during competition by contestants: Anthony (Won a Special Finale Performance)

== See also ==
- High School Musical
- High School Musical 2
- High School Musical 3: Senior Year
- High School Musical: El Desafío (disambiguation)
