= Kasino =

Eurodance group from Brazil

Background information
- Origin: Brazil
- Genres: House; Eurodance; Dance music; Dance-pop
- Years active: 2003–2009; 2014–2016; 2020–present
- Labels: Building Records; Maxpop Music; Massiva Music
- Members: Fabio Almeida (Mister Jam); Ian Duarte
- Past members: Fher Cassini; Bo Anders; Juliana Machado; Aretha Mello
- Website: https://kasinooficial.com/

Kasino is a Brazilian Eurodance music group established in 2003, in Rio de Janeiro. Music production duo Fabio Almeida, known as Mister Jam, and Ian Duarte started the musical project in the studio in 2003, and in 2005, they achieved major success with the song Can’t Get Over, which was a major hit in Brazil, and received widespread airplay on radio and TV throughout the country. Fher Cassini served as the project’s front man at the start, but he was later replaced by Bo Anders.

Currently, Kasino is led by Fabio Almeida and Ian Duarte, the founders of the group.

== Career ==
The project began when Fabianno "Mister Jam" Almeida (at the time the lead singer of the band of the same name) and music producer Ian Duarte set up a production company and needed someone to lead the project, which is where Fher Cassini (stage name of Fernando Biscaia, at the time the former president of the Mr. Jam fan club) came from.

=== Initial success ===
Conceived to be only a studio project, Kasino rose to fame after the sudden inclusion of their first single Can't Get Over on the soundtrack of the soap opera América, from Rede Globo. Kasino had received a commission from Rede Globo to create a dance song for the character Sol, played by Deborah Secco, in the soap opera. At the show, it was the theme of "Boate Ocean Drive". It was track number 8 on the soundtrack, and number 4 on Kasino's album Light of Love.

Can't Get Over was an instant success, sparking concerts, new songs, an album, a live DVD, two official tours, and countless appearances on talk shows, including an iconic performance on Sabadaço, which became a meme. According to ECAD, Can't Get Over was the 18th most played song in Southern Brazil between January and March 2006 and the 6th most played song in Northern Brazil between January and March 2006.

Some people who knew the group did not know that it was composed by Brazilians.

Kasino also released Stay Tonight, the second song of the album. Another successful song of the group was Shake It, the song which is the first track of the album and was the 14th most played song in Southern Brazil between April and June 2007, and was part of the soundtrack of Rede Globo soap opera Páginas da Vida, from 2006.

Another songs released by the group included Sexy Baby and Jump, the latter of which samples Cyndi Lauper's classic 1983 song Girls Just Want To Have Fun.

Beyond the memes, the songs featured in soap opera soundtracks, and the releases on the popular Summer Eletrohits compilations, the project went on to inspire a new generation of Brazilian electronic musicians, including Vintage Culture, Dubdogz, Flakkë, and Lazy Bear. Many leading Brazilian DJs have acknowledged Kasino’s influence on their work.

Between 2005 and 2007, Kasino toured Brazil from north to south with the Light of Love tour.

=== Later career ===
Between 2007 and 2008, Kasino underwent changes. Fher left the project, and soon after, a new vocalist, Bo Anders, joined the group, who then took over full vocal duties. He left the project in 2009 after the producers decided to temporarily put Kasino on hold.

In 2014, the group returned with the single So Free, which was recorded at Eclips studio, and released on 6 March 2014.

In 2021, after seeing an Instagram post by Canadian singer Justin Bieber, Fher Cassini announced his conversion to Evangelical Christianity and his departure from the group, focusing on his solo career as a Gospel DJ.

In 2022, the duo revived their career, releasing monthly albums on platforms featuring special guest vocalists. Kasino has been touring the country with a new tour, the Forever Tour. Kasino is back with founding members Fabio Almeida and Ian Duarte at the helm. The comeback single Get Down was released on 7 October 2022.

In 2023 the group released a new album called Legacy of Love, and the group went on a new tour called the Kasino Forever Tour, which will tour Brazil until 2025, when they will start a new tour in October.

Kasino has since returned with new songs and a show that mixes DJ sets, live synths, vocals and image projections.

In 2026, Kasino will tour Brazil with its "Ultimate Tour". Since then, Kasino has been performing throughout the country with the "Ultimate Tour", which promises to be their last before the project's planned conclusion in 2027.

== In popular culture ==
Kasino is still well remembered on social media, especially for the group's performance on Sabadaço, a TV show presented by Gilberto Barros and aired by Bandeirantes, on 7 October 2006, where he was received by a scream that became a meme on the internet: "Aê, Kasinão!", as well as due to Barros' constant interruptions during Kasino's performance.

At another live performance, this time at the end of a live performance of Shake It at nighttime show Boa Noite Brasil, Barros misstated the origin of the group, saying: "The first time I saw Kasino, I wanted to speak English with him, and he said: You don't need to, I'm from Santos". At an interview with Danilo Gentili, host of the SBT program The Noite in 2018, Barros said: "When the song ended, I said, "Wow, I don't speak much English, but let's go. Look, 'Welcome to Brazil!'" He said, "I'm from the eastern zone (of the city of São Paulo)..." And I didn't know, really, in fact..." However, Cassini later said about Barros' statements: "What bothered me was just his lack of information, since he said I'm from Santos, (then Barros said Cassini was) from the East Zone of São Paulo, when I'm actually from Rio de Janeiro.".

It was recently confirmed by Fabio Almeida and Ian Duarte, the producers and founding members of Kasino that they were responsible for Kasino's vocals from the beginning. Fher had been hired in 2005 to lead the project and promote the songs but he didn't sing the first two singles from their debut album. The lead vocals on the massive hits Can't Get Over and Stay Tonight were provided by Fabio Almeida, even though it's Fher who is shown on the respective music videos. However Fher sang all the following tracks on the album and shared lead vocals with Fabio on the track Secret Lover as well.

== Discography ==
=== Albums ===
- Light of Love (Building Records) (2006)
- Legacy of Love (2023)

=== Singles ===
- "Sexy Baby" (2003)
- "Can't Get Over" (2005)
- "Stay Tonight" (2005)
- "Shake It" (2006)
- "Jump" (2007)
- "Light of Love 2014" (2014)
- "So Free" (2014)
- "Get Down" (2022)

== See also ==
- List of Eurodance artists
