= Wanessa Camargo (2001 album) =

Studio album by Wanessa Camargo
- Released: November 10, 2001
- Genre: Country pop; teen pop
- Length: 53:47
- Language: Portuguese; English
- Label: RCA, BMG
- Producer: Jason Deere

Wanessa Camargo chronology
Wanessa Camargo (2000)	Wanessa Camargo (2001)	Wanessa Camargo (2002)

Singles from Wanessa Camargo
- 1. "Eu Quero Ser o Seu Amor" Released: November 21, 2001; 2. "Tanta Saudade (Heaven Came Down)" Released: May 11, 2002; 3. "Gostar de Mim (Never Goin' That Way Again)" Released: August 22, 2002

Wanessa Camargo is the second studio album by Brazilian pop singer Wanessa Camargo, released on November 10, 2001. The lead single was "Eu Quero Ser o Seu Amor". The album sold about 500,000 copies in Brazil, and was certified gold by Associação Brasileira dos Produtores de Discos (ABPD).

== Development ==
The album follows the same line as the first album, which consists mostly of romantic songs but also features a lighter outline of more danceable songs, such as the first single, "Eu Quero Ser o Seu Amor", as well as the songs "Enfeitiçada" and "Tudo Bem", showing an expressive maturation in the singer's voice. The album includes an interactive track when played on a computer, with testimonials by the singer and a music video of the track "Eu Posso Te Sentir" from her first album. One of the composers and producers of the album, Jason Deere, is American. He composed the songs in English and later Wanessa changed them to Portuguese. The songs are from Wanessa herself and not from other artists. Although "Gostar De Mim" was a single and received a music video (directed by Hugo Prata), the song was no longer included in the singer's concerts.

== Track listing ==
Wanessa Camargo – Standard edition
No.	Title	Writer(s)	Length
1.	"Eu Quero Ser o Seu Amor"	César Lemos; Karla Aponte	4:20
2.	"Se Aquela Estrela é Sua (Kiss Across The Ocean)"	Jason Deere; Alexa Falk; Natalie Falk; Version: Dudu Falcão	3:49
3.	"Tanta Saudade (Heaven Came Down)"	Deere; Bonnie Baker; Kellie Coffey; Versão: Falcão	3:50
4.	"Tudo Bem"	Lemos; Zé Henrique; Aponte	3:54
5.	"Um Grande Amor (I'm Missing You)"	Deere; Alexa Falk; Version: Falcão	3:58
6.	"Amor de Verão (Amor de Verano)"	Deere; Lemos; Aponte	3:12
7.	"Gostar de Mim (Never Goin' That Way Again)"	Deere; Marie Wilson; Version: Falcão	3:20
8.	"Enfeitiçada (Que Me Pasa?)"	Ramatis Moraes; Lemos; Aponte	3:51
9.	"Eu Estarei Aqui (You Can Let Me Down)"	Trina Harmon; Deere; Coffey; Version: Falcão	3:39
10.	"De Onde Você Vai Surgir"	Lia Soares; Márcio Cruz; Pedro Barezzi	3:27
11.	"Um Outro Alguém (To Love Again)"	Deere; Version: Falcão	3:19
12.	"Vou Gritar Seu Nome"	Wanessa Camargo; Juno	3:07
13.	"Never Goin' That Way Again"	Deere; Wilson	3:20
14.	"You Can Let Me Down"	Harmon; Deere; Coffey	3:29
15.	"Interactive Track - Interview + music video of "Eu Posso Te Sentir""		7:38
Total length:			53:47

== Personnel ==
- César Lemos - arranger, bass, electric guitar, synthesizer
- Silvio Richetto - organ, percussion
- Jonathan Yudkin - banjo, strings
- Zé Henrique - bass
- Glenn Worf - bass
- Shannon Forrest - drums
- Bepe Gemelli - drums
- Marcelão - drums, loops, percussion
- Silvio Richetto - percussion
- Glenn Pearce - electric guitar
- Russ Paul - electric guitar
- Mike Noble - guitar
- Serginho Knust - electric guitar, slide guitar
- Russ Paul - sitar
- Byron Hagan - synthesizer
- Vitor Chicri - keyboards

== Certifications ==
Region	Certification	Certified units/sales
Brazil (Pro-Música Brasil)	Gold	500,000
