= W (Wanessa Camargo album) =

Studio album by Wanessa Camargo
- Released: August 8, 2005
- Recorded: 2005
- Genres: Pop; dance-pop
- Length: 54:04
- Language: Portuguese
- Labels: RCA, Sony BMG
- Producers: Wanessa Camargo; Apollo 9; DJ Zégon; Cesar Lemos; Jason Deere

Wanessa Camargo chronology
Wanessa Camargo (2002)	W (2005)	Total (2007)

Singles from W
- 1. "Amor, Amor" Released: June 11, 2005; 2. "Não Resisto a Nós Dois" Released: January 10, 2006

W is the fourth studio album by Brazilian recording artist Wanessa, released on August 1, 2005. It was released on August 8, 2005, through Sony BMG, followed by a release in other countries three years later on RCA Records. After fulfilling several appointments on her schedule, such as the release of her first live album Transparente and appearances on television, the singer had more time to record her fourth album. In the meantime, its producer César Lemos. Camargo composed eleven of the fifteen tracks of the album, distancing himself more from romantic music to try new styles.

W incorporates different styles from their previous albums, which were more country pop, although the beginning of the album is like this, and experience rock in tracks like "Knock, Knock, Knock" and "Minha Vida Gira em Torno de Você" and the dance pop in tracks like "Amor, Amor". As of March 2006, more than 50,000 copies of the product were purchased in Brazil.

Of W three singles were released. The first, "Amor, Amor", had a great repercussion in Brazil, becoming one of the most executed in the country. His music video was recorded at the Music School of the Federal University of Rio de Janeiro under the direction of Victor Cesar Bota. The second, "Não Resisto a Nós Dois", repeated the success of the previous one, being among the five most played in the city of São Paulo. The third, "Louca", did not have some kind of music video or strong publicity, being sent only to the radios. A tour was also made to promote the album, entitled W in Tour ... Era Uma Vez and directed by the actress Marília Pêra.

== Background and recording ==
In October 2002, Wanessa began to present the program Jovens Tardes in Rede Globo, launching its third self-titled album of self in December of that year. The disc was gold-certified by the Associação Brasileira dos Produtores de Discos (ABPD) in 2003. In the same year, the singer recorded her first DVD; she described it as the "realization of a dream" and commented that "all that is happening is the materialization of a dream. Since I was little I wanted to be on the stage singing. Even when I danced with my father and my uncle showed us theirs, I dreamed of my moment". The product was distributed on May 24, 2004, with "Me Engana que Eu Gosto" being released as a single on the same day. The artist also made several television appearances at the time, as in the children's show Sítio do Picapau Amarelo, debuting as an actress and playing Diana Dechamps, in Quebrando a Rotina, in which the artist only entered as a participant, along with Felipe Dylon.

After finishing these appointments, the artist decided to work on her fourth studio album. Still during the recording, its producer César Lemos presented to him the Latin rhythms, which the interpreter said that "fell in love" because "it has a beat that makes us feel like dancing, to move the waist". The singer also wrote eleven of the fifteen tracks of the album. In an interview with the Resenhando portal, she said to compose "at unusual times, in moments when I'm alone and start writing. There is no time, no right place."

== Composition ==
"My professional moment has been a lot of work and new partnerships. [...] I was hospitalized in the studio 24 hours a day. It was crucial to discover a personality in my music. Now my song is stronger than my word."

— Wanessa talking about her musical change in W.

W is an album that derives from the musical genres Soft rock, dance-pop and its composition consists of romantic bands to songs with the electronic style. The interpreter reported on the release of his album that in the process of composing the same, his "desire to vent was too great" and that he was "reclusive at the end of 2004 to question my life and my dreams". She also said that the CD is "a cry of freedom, an encounter with myself." The song that starts the album, "Relax", was reviewed by the Musical Universe, which said that "verses there Roberto and Erasmo like "Live life without hurry / Be happy is what matter" and "Life is yours , how to live" may even be good advice to others, but rather have been well assimilated by those who wrote them." "My Life Spins Around You" is a ballad written by the interpreter and her father, Zezé di Camargo.

Third track of the album, "Culpada" takes away the myth of eternal male guilt, revealing that women also betray in lines like "The taste of sin I also tasted / I was worse than you / Because I knew how to hide." Already the fifth track of the disc, "Não Resisto a Nós Dois", displays riffs of guitar, in a rock melody. Other tracks that explore rock include "Chamar Atenção" and "Knock, Knock, Knock", the latter being turned to folk. From the ninth track of the album, "Eu Sou", the electronic style begins. The original version of the composition of "Te Quero Só Me" is called "Sure Thing", while "Me Devorar" shows influences of the disco music. The twelfth composition, "Amor, Amor", follows the line of Latin pop, having been compared by the Universo Musical to the songs of the Rouge group. The track "Meu Menino" quotes Prince, an American musical artist. The album ends with "Era uma Vez", the only track that only Wanessa composed.

== Critical reception ==
Professional ratings
Review scores
Source	Rating
Allmusic	4/5 stars

Initial reviews for W have been mixed. The Washington Post's Allison Stewart offered a negative view on the project, writing that Wanessa "began a bad year with a bad record." In his written evaluation to the Milwaukee Journal Sentinel, Piet Levy wrote that Campbell is "less an anxious child than an adult" in this new project, although when Wanessa flat come-ons are juxtaposed with experienced R&B of course as an interpreter, he still has a lot of growing to do. Pop portal commenter found the genres of the album strange according stating that "Wanessa had outdone himself this time."

already critical Manoel Grachi found the excellent album of others who did wanessa saying: "You can see she grew a lot in this last record, although the songs are alternative versions to liguagem her, she demonstrated that knows how to do it well"He said the commentator, other critics of contemporary music found a poor mix of genres, saying Wanessa not used the Latin genres.

== Promotion ==
=== Singles ===
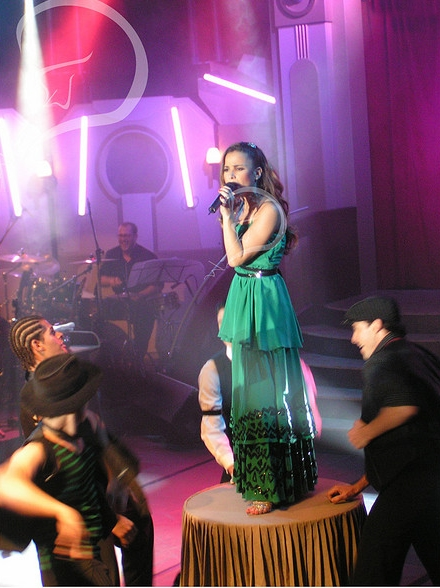
Wanessa performing "Amor, Amor" on the W in Tour... Era Uma Vez.

"Amor, Amor" was released as the first and lead single by W on June 11, 2005. It gained a great repercussion in Brazil, becoming one of the ten most played in the country in the week of August 10 of that year according to measurement done by Crowley Broadcast Analysis. His corresponding music video, directed by Victor Botta and recorded in the School of Music of the Federal University of Rio de Janeiro, shows Camargo performing dance steps while the music is reproduced. In February 2006, "Não Resisto a Nós Dois" was released as the second track and repeated the success of its predecessor, debuting in the sixth position among the thirty most played in São Paulo in the week of March 22, 2006, the third with the highest execution in the state the following week. The last single, Louca, was released in August of that year and was released only for radios.

=== W in Tour... Era Uma Vez ===
To promote W, Wanessa embarked on the W in Tour... Era Uma Vez. Directed by the actress Marília Pêra, the tour was inspired by Broadway musicals and told the story of Eva, a girl who dreams of being a singer, faces the jealousy of her ex-boyfriend and leaves everything to pursue her career. At the time, the singer commented on the tour, saying that "it's a show that worked well and very different from what the Brazilian public is accustomed to seeing." She also said in an interview with Terra that the tour "has many musical touches, unlike previous ones that showed a script with songs and choreography, this one brings a story".

== Track listing ==
No.	Title	Writer(s)	Length
1.	"Relaxa (Don't Worry 'Bout a Thing)"	Jason Deere, Kristin Osborn (Version by Wanessa Camargo)	3:31
2.	"Minha Vida Gira em Torno de Você"	Wanessa Camargo, Zezé di Camargo	3:26
3.	"Culpada (Más Mala Que Tú)"	Cláudia Brant, Gabriel Flores (Version by César Lemos)	3:50
4.	"Eu Vou Sonhar (Please Don't Smile)"	Deere, Trina Harmon (Version by Wanessa)	3:54
5.	"Não Resisto a Nós Dois"	Carlos Colla, Zé Henrique, Sergio Knust, Marcelão	4:10
6.	"Louca"	Césas Lemos, Karla Aponte	3:56
7.	"Chamar Atenção (Sick Inside)"	Deere, Kevin Kadish (Version by Wanessa)	3:23
8.	"Knock, Knock, Knock (Up, Up, Up)"	Emanuel Olsson, Jeanette Olsson (Version by Milton Guedes)	3:21
9.	"Eu Sou (Vertigo)"	Henrik Korpi, Mathias Johansson, Gary Clark (Version by Wanessa)	3:47
10.	"Te Quero Só Pra Mim (Sure Thing)"	Deere, Harmon, Paisley Van Patten (Version by Wanessa)	3:52
11.	"Me Devorar (Mysterious)"	Johan Gunnarsson, Mikael Andersson, Ove Andre Brenna (Version by Wanessa)	2:44
12.	"Amor, Amor"	Lemos, Aponte	2:57
13.	"Meu Menino"	Wanessa, Mello Jr., Apollo 9	4:00
14.	"Festa na Floresta"	Wanessa, Apollo 9	3:17
15.	"Era Uma Vez"	Wanessa	3:50

== Chart positions ==
Chart (2005)	Position
Brazil Top 20	6

== Personnel ==
- Midas Studios (São Paulo, São Paulo)
- Thelma's East (Nashville, Tennessee)
- Miami Beat Studios (Miami, Florida)
- Estúdios da Ludwig van (São Paulo)
- Estúdios Mega (São Paulo)
- The Living Room (Miami, Flórida)
- J.R. Duran: photography
- Daniela Conolly: artistic direction, graphic design
- Sandro Mesquita: artistic coordination, image processing
- Rodrigo Gunfeld: stylist
- Ale de Souza: make up
- Wanessa Camargo: composition, translation, lead vocalist, supporting vocalist, choir
- César Lemos: composition, translation, lead vocalist, supporting vocalist, choir
- Jason Deere: composition, production, synthesizers, bass, six string guitar, twelve string guitar, guitars, choir
- Kyristin Osborn: composition
- Trina Harmon: composition
- Zé Henrique: composition
- Sérgio Knust: composition
- Karla Aponte: composition
- Kenirik Korpi: composition
- Mthias Johansson: composition
- Gary Clark: composition
- Apollo 9: Native Instruments, guitar, synthesizers, goland, GR-707, Hohner clavinet, NI Battery, mellotron, samplers, Kong Triton Extreme, Arp 2600
- Mello Jr: composition
- DJ Zégon: production, beats
- Andy Viccente: drums
- Louis Richy: keyboards, loops
- Silvio Richetto: vocal engineering, recording engineering, mixing engineering, mixing
- Paisley van Patten: composition
- Marcelão: composition
- Carlos Colla: composition
- Zezé di Camargo: composition
- Claudia Brant: composition
- Gabriel Flores: composition
- Emanuel Olsson: composition
- Jeanette Olsson: composition
- Johan Gunnarsson: composition
- Mikael Andersson: composition
- Ove Andre Brenna: composition
- Milton Guedes: composition, translation
- Carlos Valentin: mixing assistance
- Brendan Duffey (Brandão): mixing engineering, recording engineering
- Iara Negrete: support vocalist
- Lampadinha: recording engineering
- Konstantine Leitvineco: cello
- Ramón Calderas: percussion
- David "O Marroquino" Corços: mixing
- Lucas Mayer: guitars
- José Nigro: bass
- Tatá Squalla: guitars

== Release history ==
Region	Date	Format	Label
Brazil	August 8, 2005	CD, Digital download	Sony BMG
France	July 14, 2008	Digital download	RCA Records
Italy	July 14, 2008	Digital download	RCA Records
Spain	July 14, 2008	Digital download	RCA Records
