= Paulo Bethencourt =

Brazilian composer

Paulo Bethencourt (born Paulo Bethencourt da Silva Franco Neto, in Rio de Janeiro, Brazil) is a music producer, composer, and arranger. He has created original works for labels and media companies such as Sony Music International, Universal Music Group, Warner Music Group, BMG, and Discovery Channel.

== Early life ==
Bethencourt was raised during Brazil's authoritarian military regime, which lasted from 1964 to 1985. His formative years were shaped by the emergence of MPB (Música Popular Brasileira), a genre rooted in Bossa Nova and known for its veiled lyrical critiques of social injustice and state repression. At the age of nine, he began studying piano under the tutelage of Ethel Sophia Galliza. Shortly thereafter, he was introduced to Jazz and Bossa Nova by his neighbor, the acclaimed saxophonist Victor Assis Brasil, who had performed with international jazz legends such as Chick Corea, Dizzy Gillespie, and Ron Carter. Encouraged by renowned classical composer and conductor Edino Krieger, Bethencourt resolved to pursue a professional career in music.

In 1989, he became the first Brazilian citizen to receive a government-sponsored grant to study jazz abroad—an initiative reflecting Brazil’s efforts to foster cultural development in the aftermath of the dictatorship. He was accepted into Musicians Institute (MI) in Los Angeles, California. However, his plans were abruptly disrupted in 1990 when the newly elected president, Fernando Collor de Mello—later impeached—froze the personal assets of Brazilian citizens and eliminated federal cultural funding, including Bethencourt’s grant.

He subsequently enrolled at Musiarte, a private music conservatory in Copacabana, Rio de Janeiro, where he was awarded a full scholarship. Bethencourt graduated with honors two years later.

== Cruise lines and Scala Miami ==
In 1991, Bethencourt relocated to Miami, Florida, where he spent the next twelve years working as a music producer and composer for several major cruise lines, including Royal Caribbean, Celebrity Cruises, Carnival Cruise Lines, Island Cruises, and Premier Cruises.

On October 27, 1993, in collaboration with Scala Rio, The Four Ambassadors Hotel and SMN Productions, Bethencourt launched Scala Miami—a dinner-show theater overlooking Biscayne Bay. In May 1994, he received the Culture, Arts & Communication Award for his production Rio Ecstasy, which premiered at Scala Miami and later opened at the Oasis Hotel in Cancun, Mexico, in 1995.

Following the collapse of Premier Cruise Lines in 2000 and the broader economic fallout from the September 11 attacks in 2001, the cruise industry underwent significant restructuring and budget reductions. In response to these challenges, Bethencourt left the sector to refocus on his recording and production career.

== Record industry ==
In 1997, Bethencourt produced two award-winning projects with artists Barão Vermelho (BMG, Brazil) and Wyclef Jean (Sony Music, USA). His remix of "Guantanamera" was featured in over 20 international compilations and became part of the NBC television series Baywatch by NBC, earning him a RIAA's Double-Platinum Certification.

In 1999, Bethencourt was invited by Warner/Chappell’s Senior Vice President, Ellen Moraskie, to become an exclusive songwriting for the company. That same year, he received his second RIAA Platinum Album Certification in the United States for his work on “Rivera", by the artist Jerry Rivera (Sony Music). Moraskie’s sudden passing in 2003 had a profound impact on Bethencourt, who regarded her as a visionary in the music industry.

By 2000, Bethencourt was actively producing, composing, and arranging albums in English, Spanish, and Portuguese. His work yielded top-charting singles across Latin America for artists such as Fabio Junior (BMG), Wanessa Camargo (Sony/BMG), and Martin Ricca (Sony/BMG). As a producer on “Evolución” by the artist Luis Enrique (Warner Music Group), he earned a nomination for the 43rd Grammy Awards by the Recording Industry Association of America.

In 2001, Bethencourt became the Artists and Repertoire (A&R) Director for Sony Music's Regional Strategic Marketing Department in Miami Beach, Florida. There, he established a successful joint venture between Sony Music, Telemundo/NBC and Rede Globo, producing multiple award-winning projects including “El Clon”, “Puerto De Los Milagros”, "Uga-Uga”, “Vale Todo” and “Terra Nostra.”

By 2003, rampant copyright infringement led to the closure of Sony Music’s 605 Lincoln Road building and the disbanding of its regional strategic marketing division. That same year, Bethencourt founded Exit 12 Entertainment, which quickly grew to become the second-largest independent music video distributor in Hispanic Latin America. Despite its early success, persistent challenges posed by piracy forced the company to cease operations in 2007.

Following the company’s closure, Bethencourt relocated to Los Angeles, where he resumed his work as a soundtrack composer. In 2014, he returned to Florida to assume the role of Vice President of Marketing and International Operations for Lennar Homes, the second-largest homebuilder in the United States.
