= Beautiful Encounter (Yan Yu) =

2010 song by Elva Hsiao

Single by Elva Hsiao

from the album Diamond Candy
- Released: 2010
- Recorded: 2009
- Genre: Pop, electropop, Mandopop
- Length: 3:09
- Label: EMI
- Songwriter(s): Michael Jay, Johnny Pedersen

Elva Hsiao singles chronology
| "WOW" (2010) | "Beautiful Encounter (Yan Yu)" (2010) | "Sparklingly Lovely" (2010) |

"Beautiful Encounter (Yan Yu)" is a song by Taiwanese recording artist Elva Hsiao, taken from her tenth studio album, Diamond Candy, released by EMI.

== Song information ==
Composed by Michael Jay and Johnny Pedersen, the song was released to radio stations of Taiwan as a promotional single from the album Diamond Candy in 2010, shortly after the release of the fifth single, "WOW" to maintain good sales of her album while preparing the next album, Miss Elva.

== Chart performance ==
=== Charts ===
| Chart (2011) | Peak position |
|---|---|
| Taiwan (G-Music) | 27 |

== Wanessa version ==
"Worth It"

Single by Wanessa

from the album DNA
- Released: September 9, 2010
- Genre: Pop-dance, electropop
- Length: 3:06
- Label: Sony BMG Music Entertainment
- Songwriter(s): Michael Jay, Johnny Pedersen
- Producer(s): Mr. Jam

Wanessa singles chronology
| "Falling for U" (2010) | "Worth It" (2010) | "Stuck On Repeat" (2011) |

In 2010, Brazilian pop singer Wanessa covered the song, with the title "Worth It", for her EP, Você não Perde por Esperar. The song leaked on the Internet on September 3, being officially released on September 9, 2010.

=== Music video ===
The video for "Worth It" shows Wanessa, accompanied by dancers, dancing to music. The singer and the dancers wear several different outfits throughout the video, alternating between the colors black, white and red, as well as the backdrop. Special effects simulating sprayed ink are included in some scenes. The video was released on the singer's account on YouTube, on November 16, 2011 and it was directed by Luis Fiod and creative director of photography, Henry Gendre.

=== Critical reception ===
The video received mixed reviews. The editors of the site Vírgula, from UOL said: "Wanessa continues strong in its goal of becoming the great diva of the Brazilian LGBT. Her new video, Worth It brings a lot of energy choreography and "banging" of hair. For those who do not know, "Ram-hair" is the nickname given to the type of house with female vocal pop ballads popular gay. Accompanied by eight dancers and colorful special effects, the video has everything to consecrate Wanessa in various segments of the public."

Already the site has made three three Chick criticism, saying that "Wanessa, the "American singer from Brazil". (...) Truth be told, she has done things properly, all well produced. But still lack a bit of salt, right? Music videos, dances, songs too bureaucratic. She needs a little innovation ...".
