= DNA (Wanessa Camargo album) =

Studio album by Wanessa
- Released: July 28, 2011
- Recorded: 2010–11
- Genres: EDM; electropop
- Language: English
- Label: Sony BMG
- Producers: Mr. Jam, Dennonyx

Wanessa chronology
Você não Perde por Esperar (2010)	DNA (2011)	DNA Tour (2013)

Singles from DNA
- 1. "Sticky Dough" Released: July 5, 2011; 2. "DNA" Released: October 24, 2011; 3. "Get Loud!" Released: June 26, 2012

DNA is the seventh studio album by Brazilian recording artist Wanessa, released on July 28, 2011 by Sony Music Entertainment.

== Production ==
Musically, the album was influenced by electronic dance music, and other genres, with elements like funk carioca and dubstep. DNA was produced by Mr. Jam and Dennonyx. The first information about DNA appeared in 2010 in an interview with radio Transamerica, revealing that the album would be entirely in English. The recording sessions started in São Paulo, Brazil and it was finished and mastered in New York, in the Sterling Sound Studios.

== Background ==
On November 13, 2010 Wanessa revealed in an interview for the radio Transamerica her new album was recorded in early 2011, with an electropop dance sound, and would include the four songs from her EP "Party Line", "Stuck on Repeat", "Falling For U" and "Worth It". On January 8, 2011, against the comments that it would launch an international album, Wanessa, in an interview for Rolling Stone Brazil said that, her plans were to set herself in Brazil. In the same interview, the singer said she would be entering the studio to release her album at the end of March, which would be entirely in English and focusing on pop and a remix of the single "Stuck On Repeat", produced by American DJ Dave Aude, known by his work with Lindsay Lohan, Hilary Duff and Lady Gaga.

On March 14, the singer participated in the program Combo - Fala + Joga, and revealed that the album would be postponed to June 2011 and that it would not only include electropop songs, but also include two calm and romantic songs, devoted to gender in her most successful single, "Não Resisto a Nós Dois". In another interview, Wanessa said that her new album was produced by Mr. Jam, known for working with the singer in the tracks "Falling For U" and "Stuck On Repeat". DNA would be composed of 16 tracks.

On July 17, it was confirmed by the singer's Twitter that the album would be released on July 28, 2011, eight days behind the previously announced release. On July 18, the cover and back cover and the official track list of the album were released, bringing 14 songs, two less than expected, and excluding "Party Line", the only track in the 2010 track list that had been composed by Wanessa (however, two other compositions by Wanessa entered the track list, "It's Over" and "Blind Faith"). Five days before its scheduled release, DNA leaked in full.

== Tour ==
The tour of this work was in fact a mutation that came from the need to adapt the great show of the Tour Meu Momento to night clubs, then appeared the Ballad Tour that with the launch of the new songs originated the DNA Tour. Wanessa, six months pregnant, closed the first part of the " DNA Tour " with show at LGBT The Week nightclub in São Paulo on October 29, 2011 . The forecast return of the tour, with the 2nd part, in March 2012. All the concerts of this tour were made in nightclubs until the recording of the DVD that occurred only with the singer's return after pregnancy and had a great structure, until then unpublished, since the focus for the work were only the nightclubs with structure reduced.

== Critical reception ==
Professional ratings
Review scores
Source	Rating
Notas Musicais	3/5 stars
Que Delícia né Gente	3.5/5 stars
Território da Música	3/5 stars
Rolling Stone Brasil	3/5 stars
O Dia	Positive

The album received very positive professional reviews. Mauro Ferreira in the newspaper O Dia, stated that Wanessa was finding her identity and that the album was "A dance sound blatantly pop, even more pop than the standard dictated by Frenchman David Guetta, world magician of the genre." The critic highlighted the songs "Get Loud!", "Murder", "Blow Me Away" as the album's best track title track "DNA" ranked as the most seductive. Already the website Território da Música (formerly Pop Channel) has made positive criticisms saying that "Technically, the work is exquisite, with great musical production, good repertoire, cohesive arrangements, impeccable recording and mixing, and a musician's trump card", conceptualizing the album as "an important moment in Wanessa's career" and highlighting the tracks "DNA", "Stuck On Repeat" and "Blind Faith". The magazine Rolling Stone Brasil stated that the album is "extremely professional", highlighting the songs "Sticky Dough", "Falling for U", "Worth It", "Murder" and the romantic "It's Over". The critics still say: "She continues in her persona of dancing diva entering head on the electronic pop bag, with lyrics in English and production (in charge of the Brazilian Mister Jam) that nothing is owed to international singers like Britney Spears and Ke$ha". concluding that Wanessa "has the merit of having reinvented herself," completing calling the singer extremely professional.

== Track listing ==
No.	Title	Writer(s)	Length
1.	"DNA"	Jason Gill; Robin Lennart Fredriksson; Mattias Per Larsson; Loreen	3:44
2.	"Stuck on Repeat"	Alex James; Michael Jay; Andre Lindal; Elle Vee	3:10
3.	"Murder"	Dsign Music	3:36
4.	"Worth It"	Michael Jay; Johnny Pedersen; Mary Little	3:08
5.	"Sticky Dough" (featuring BamBam)	Dsign Music	3:32
6.	"Get Loud!"	Fabianno	2:57
7.	"Falling for U" (featuring Mr. Jam)	Fabianno; Ian Duarte	3:42
8.	"Blow Me Away"	Jason Gill; Katt Rockell	4:21
9.	"Rescue Mission"	David Siegel; Michelle Marie Trumpler; Shane Stoner	3:55
10.	"Tonight Forever"	David Siegel; Michelle Marie Trumpler; Shane Stoner; Omar Tavarez	4:03
11.	"High"	Dsign Music; Bardur Haberg; Oli Jogvansson	4:34
12.	"It's Over"	Wanessa; Fabianno	3:32

Bonus tracks
No.	Title	Writer(s)	Length
1.	"Stuck on Repeat" (Dave Audé Club Mix)	Alexandre James; Michael Jay; Andre Lindal	7:38
2.	"Worth It" (Mister Jam Boomboxx Club Mix)	Michael Jay; Johnny Pedersen; Mary Little	5:54
3.	"Blind Faith (Epilogue)"	Wanessa; Fabianno	1:32
