= Elementary School Musical =

Elementary School Musical may refer to:

- "Elementary School Musical" (South Park), a 2008 episode of the animated television series South Park
- "Elementary School Musical" (The Simpsons), a 2010 episode of the animated television series The Simpsons

== See also ==
- School musical, musical theatre performed in schools
