= Wanessa Camargo (2002 album) =

Studio album by Wanessa Camargo
- Released: December 5, 2002
- Recorded: 2002
- Genre: Country pop; teen pop
- Length: 53:50
- Language: Portuguese; English
- Label: RCA, BMG
- Producer: Jason Deere

Wanessa Camargo chronology
Wanessa Camargo (2001)	Wanessa Camargo (2002)	W (2005)

Singles from Wanessa Camargo
- 1. "Um Dia... Meu Primeiro Amor" Released: November 18, 2002; 2. "Sem Querer" Released: April 9, 2003; 3. "Filme de Amor" Released: September 22, 2003

Wanessa Camargo is the third studio album by Brazilian singer Wanessa Camargo. It was released on December 5, 2002, by BMG Brasil and RCA Records. The album represented a departure from her previous studio albums which incorporate more elements of country music.

The album was a commercial success, selling over 350,000 copies in Brazil and receiving a gold certification by the Associação Brasileira dos Produtores de Discos (ABPD).

== Background and development ==
Following the release of her second album Wanessa Camargo (2001), Camargo began recording material for her third album. The writing and production team includes Jason Deere, César Lemos and Silvio Richetto who were also involved in her previous album and were tasked with creating a more pop-sounding record.

== Promotion and release ==
In October 2002, Camargo performed two showcases in Lisbon and Porto and appeared on TV shows such as Lux, Olá Portugal and A Vida é Bela ahead of the album's release.

The first single, "Um Dia... Meu Primeiro Amor" was released on November 18, 2002. The music video was recorded on November 5, 2002. Camargo embarked on a heavy promotional campaign on Brazilian TV shows including Domingo Legal and Domingão do Faustão as well as Jovens Tardes, a daytime TV show that she had begun hosting a month prior.

A follow-up single, "Sem Querer" was released on April 9, 2003. The music video was recorded in May 2003.

Furthermore, in 2003, Camargo embarked on a concert tour named Turnê Olympia to promote the album.

== Track listing ==
Wanessa Camargo – Standard edition
No.	Title	Writer(s)	Length
1.	"Como Dizer ao Coração"	César Lemos; Karla Aponte	3:37
2.	"Um Dia... Meu Primeiro Amor (My Sweet Someday)"	Jason Deere; Natalie Falk; Alexa Falk; Versão: Dudu Falcão	3:30
3.	"Sem Querer"	Deere; Lemos; Jamie Richard	3:32
4.	"Filme de Amor"	Carlos Colla; Zé Henrique; Sérgio Knust; Marcelão	3:52
5.	"O Tempo Que a Paixão Quiser (How Could I Love You More)"	Deere; Trina Harmon; Versão: Falcão	4:23
6.	"Paga Pra Ver (Tô Pagando Pra Ver)"	Alvaro Socci; Pablo; Fernando	3:42
7.	"Vou Te Amar Pra Sempre"	Greyce; Silvio Richetto	3:40
8.	"Tentei Te Esquecer (Phones Are Ringin' All Over Town)"	Marc Beeson; Kin Vassy; David MacKechnie; Versão: Wanessa Camargo, Juno	3:29
9.	"Sonho Meu"	Lemos; Camargo	3:55
10.	"Nada Sem o Seu Amor (Don't Have To Let Go)"	Jessica Simpson; Harmon; Deere; Versão: Falcão	4:00
11.	"Falta Teu Beijo"	Lemos; Aponte	3:43
12.	"Te Amo Assim"	Pedro Barezzi; Lucas Robles	4:10
13.	"O Nosso Amor (Your Love)"	Deere; Lemos; Version: Falcão	4:04
14.	"My Sweet Someday"	Deere; Natalie Falk; Alexa Falk	3:30
Total length:			53:50

== Certifications ==
Region	Certification	Certified units/sales
Brazil (Pro-Música Brasil)	Gold	350,000
