= Abrázame =

Single by Camila

from the album Todo Cambió
- Released: March 13, 2006
- Genre: Latin pop
- Length: 3:46
- Label: Norte
- Songwriter: Mario Domm
- Producer: Mario Domm

Camila singles chronology
"Abrázame" (2006)	""Coleccionista de Canciones"" (2007)

"Abrázame" (Eng.: "Hold Me") is a song by Mexican band Camila. It was released in March 13, 2006, as the first single from the album Todo Cambió. In 2008, the song was re-recorded with Brazilian pop singer Wanessa and included on her album Total and also as a bonus track on the Brazilian pressings of Todo Cambió.

== Remix version ==
The band recorded a Spanish-Portuguese version with Brazilian singer Wanessa Camargo. The version was released as single on 14 May 2008 from Brazilian version of Todo Cambió to promote the band in the country, and also included in the re-release of Wanessa's fifth studio album Total (2008).

== Charts ==
Chart	Peak position
Argentina Top 100	2
Chile Top 100	1
Colombia Top 40	1
United States Billboard Latin Songs	30
United States Billboard Latin Pop Songs	8
Mexico Mexican Singles Chart	2
Peru Top 20 Ranking	1

=== Certifications ===
Region	Certification	Certified units/sales
Mexico (AMPROFON) Ringtone	Platinum	25,000^{*}
^{*} Sales figures based on certification alone.
