= Xuxa e os Duendes (soundtrack) =

Soundtrack album by various artists
- Released: January 2002
- Recorded: 2001
- Genres: Pop; Instrumental; Children's music
- Length: 52:01
- Label: Som Livre
- Producer: Michael Sullivan

Xuxa e os Duendes (transl. Xuxa and the Elves) the soundtrack of the film of the same name, released in 2002 by Som Livre. The album consists of songs performed by the protagonist, the presenter Xuxa Meneghel and other artists. The soundtrack was released in early 2002, shortly after the release of the film on DVD. The soundtrack brings several artists such as Angélica, Carlinhos Brown, and Wanessa Camargo. The soundtrack was released in CD and cassette formats.

The album has 14 tracks, 7 songs and 7 instruments. They would participate in the compositions: Vanessa Rangel, Michael Sullivan, Carlos Colla, Nando Cordel and Maurício Gaetani.

== Track listing ==
Track listing – CD edition
No.	Title	Writer(s)	Performer(s)	Length
1.	"O Maravilhoso Mundo Dos Duendes"	A. Valeri Manera; G. Fasano; Versão: Vanessa Alves	Xuxa	4:27
2.	"Duendes"	Carlinhos Brown; Boghan Costa	Carlinhos Brown	3:24
3.	"A Magia do Amor"	Ary Sperling; Mauricio Gaetani	Angélica	2:51
4.	"Tudo Que Você Sonhar"	Ary Sperling; Vanessa Rangel	Wanessa Camargo	2:55
5.	"No Reino Das Águas"	Michael Sullivan; Carlos Colla	Michael Sullivan	4:19
6.	"Momento Mágico"	Ary Sperling; Vanessa Rangel	Paquita Lana	4:21
7.	"Acalanto"	Vanessa Rangel	Vanessa Rangel	2:05
8.	"Minha Tranquilidade" (instrumental)	Nando Cordel		6:12
9.	"Presença Divina (Tema do Assovio)" (instrumental)	Nando Cordel		4:56
10.	"Momento Mágico" (instrumental)	Ary Sperling; Vanessa Rangel		4:09
11.	"Alface e Tomate" (instrumental)	Ary Sperling		1:42
12.	"Acalanto 2" (instrumental)	Vanessa Rangel		3:41
13.	"Tema do Gorgón (Batalha Final)" (instrumental)	Ary Speling		3:48
14.	"Duendes Mágicos" (instrumental)	Ary Sperling		3:03
Total length:				52:01
