= High School Musical: O Desafio =

- High School Musical: O Desafio poster
- Directed by: César Rodrigues
- Written by: Susana Cardoso; Carol Castro
- Starring: Olavo Cavalheiro; Renata Ferreira; Paula Barbosa; Fellipe Guadanucci; Wanessa Camargo
- Production companies: The Walt Disney Company Brasil; Total Entertainment
- Distributed by: Walt Disney Studios Motion Pictures International (Note: Released through the Walt Disney Pictures label.)
- Release date: February 5, 2010
- Running time: 90 minutes
- Country: Brazil
- Language: Portuguese
- Box office: $1.1 million

High School Musical: O Desafio is a spin-off film, to the High School Musical franchise. It is one of three feature film adaptations of a script written by Pablo Lago and Susana Cardozo and based on the book Battle of the Bands; this release for the Brazil market. The film stars the finalists of the Brazilian reality television High School Musical: A Seleção competition series, including: Olavo, Renata, Fellipe, Paula, Moroni, Beatriz, Samuel and Karol. Additionally, Wanessa Camargo features in a supporting role. Principal photography took place in April 2009, in Rio de Janeiro; and is notable for being the third Disney-branded feature film made in Latin America. To coincide with the Brazilian culture, the state of Bahia collaborated on developing a unique rhythm to the movie's choreography.

== Plot ==
=== 1st part ===
A new school year begins at the High School Brasil (HSB), and the students return from the summer vacations. Olavo, the captain of the school futsal team, the Lobos-Guará, discovers that Renata, his neighbor and classmate, has changed a lot over the summer. Paula, however, continues being vain and wastes her time dominating her poor brother, Fellipe, and her associates Alícia, Clara and Karol, or, as she prefers to call them, "The Invisibles".

=== 2nd part ===
The principal of the school and Ms. Márcia, the art teacher, invite the students to take part in the school's first battle of the bands, where the kids will have a chance to be showcased as true music stars. Wanessa, a former student and now a famous singer, comes to the school as adviser to the contest.

=== 3rd part ===
Working against the clock and with limited resources, the kids put all the forces for the big day. Olavo and Renata, together with their friends Moroni, Bia, Samuel, Fábio and Ed, as well as Fellipe, participate in the contest, forming a band named The Tribe. At the same time, Paula participates with her friends, and she tries the impossible task of separating Fellipe from his new friends. But only one band will be the winner, the one which can understand that teamwork, personal development, and study will make them better artists and also better people.

== Cast ==
- Olavo (Olavo Cavalheiro) is the male protagonist of the movie. He is the most popular male student at High School Brazil, and the captain of the Futsal team, the Lobos-Guará. He faces a new challenge this year in the school: forming a band for the Battle of the Bands, where he will show, despite the difficulties, his true leadership. The equivalent of Troy Bolton from the American film.
- Renata (Renata Ferreira) is the female protagonist of the movie. She is the shy and studious student who, under the astonished eyes of all her peers, suddenly becomes an attractive young girl with a talent for singing. When she feels insecure, Wanessa encourages her to be herself and exhibit her artistic talents without fears. The equivalent of Gabriella Montez from the American film.
- Paula (Paula Barbosa) is the antagonist of the film. She is the typical "rich girl", vain, selfish, who does not spare a second for the others, even for her brother Fellipe, except to get what she wants: to be the absolute and undisputed star of the school. But at the end, she learns a valuable lesson and redeems herself. The equivalent of Sharpay Evans from the American film.
- Felipe (Fellipe Guadanucci) is Paula's brother, who must use all his ingenuity to evade the surveillance of his sister to be the coach of Olavo's band. With Renata's help, and with his perseverance and recklessness, Felipe manages to become independent and show his true artistic abilities. The equivalent of Ryan Evans from the American film.
- Moroni (Moroni Cruz) is Olavo's friend and he does his best to help the Lobos-Guará team to win the state competition. The equivalent of Chad Danforth from the American film.
- Samuel (Samuel Nascimento) is Olavo's other friend, who has a deep platonic love for Wanessa. When there is a funny comment or sudden laughter, that is Samuel, the guy who never loses his sense of humor. The equivalent of Zeke Baylor from the American film.
- Bia (Beatriz Machado) is the talented composer of the band. She also demonstrates her positive attitude when time is their principal enemy. The equivalent of Kelsi Nielsen from the American film.
- Karol (Karol Cândido) is a great singer, but because she joins Paula's musical group, she is always overshadowed by the "star". The equivalent of Taylor McKessie from the American film.
- Wanessa Camargo is the adviser of the contest, is a former HSB student and now a famous singer.
- Teacher Márcia (Débora Olivieri) is HSB's art teacher, who, together with the principal, convenes the Battle of the Bands. The equivalent of Ms. Darbus from the American film.
- The High School Principal (Cláudio Torres Gonzaga). The equivalent of Principal Matsui from the American film.
- Renata's Mom (Tereza Seiblitz). The equivalent of Lisa Montez from the American film.
- Olavo's Dad (Tadeu Aguiar). The equivalent of Coach Jack Bolton from the American film.
- Paula's and Felipe's father (Herbert Richers Jr). The equivalent of Vance Evans from the American film.
- Paula's and Felipe's mother (Ilana Kaplan). The equivalent of Darby Evans from the American film.
- Clara and Alícia (Gisele Batista and Michelle Batista) are Paula's unconditional allies and members of her band. The two girls are completely subordinated to the whims and arrogance of the "star". The equivalent of the Sharpettes from the American film.
- Fábio (Fábio Enriquez) is a member of the Lobos-Guará team.
- Ed (Eduardo Lamdim) is the goalkeeper of the Lobos-Guará team. The equivalent of Jason Cross from the American film.
- Douglas (Douglas Ferregui) Lobos-Guará team.

=== List of songs ===
#	Song	Performer(s)
1	Novo Ano Começou (El Verano Terminó)	Renata, Olavo, Beatriz, Fellipe, Paula, Moroni, Karol & Samuel
2	Tudo Está Melhor (Arpoador) (La Vida Es Una Aventura)	Olavo
3	Conselho de Amiga	Renata & Wanessa
4	Futebol	Olavo
5	Matemática	Renata & Fellipe
6	Que Papel é Esse?	Paula & Fellipe
7	A Procura do Sol (A Buscar El Sol)	Renata & Beatriz
8	Romeu e Julieta (Yo Sabía)	Olavo & Renata
9	Tamanho Não É Documento	Camila Caputi (Marta and the Volleyball Players)
10	Eu Sou Única (Paula E As Invisíveis) (Superstar)	Paula e Karol (Paula and the Invisibles)
11	Faça Parte Desse Show	Renata, Olavo, Beatriz, Fellipe, Moroni & Samuel (The Tribe)
12	Atuar, Dançar, Cantar (Actuar, Bailar, Cantar)	All
13	Gosto Tanto	Wanessa

There are songs in the film that weren't included in the official soundtrack above.
