= Total (Wanessa album) =

Studio album by Wanessa Camargo
- Released: August 21, 2007
- Recorded: 2006–07
- Genre: Country pop; pop
- Length: 56:30
- Language: Portuguese
- Label: Sony Music
- Producer: Jason Deere

Wanessa Camargo chronology
W (2005)	Total (2007)	Meu Momento (2009)

Singles from Total
- 1. "Não Tô Pronta Pra Perdoar" Released: August 2, 2007; 2. "Abrázame" Released: April 11, 2008

Total is the fifth studio album by Brazilian singer Wanessa Camargo. Released on August 21, 2007, the album brought the singles Not Tô Pronta To Forgive and "Me Abrace" with the Mexican band Camila. The graphic design of the album was signed by Giovanni Bianco, who also created the graphic design of the albums of Madonna.

== Background ==
The album was released under Sony BMG and RCA Records in Brazil, produced by Giovanni Bianco, and finishes the "romantic" phase of her career. The lead single "Não Tô Pronta Pra Perdoar" was Portuguese language version of Dixie Chicks' Not Ready to Make Nice hit.

During her early career Wanessa did not put names on her albums, that started to change on her first live DVD Transparente: "I could not put a name because, for example, if I put the name of a song it would be unfair to I was a little superstitious and in the room I put Transparente which was the name of the show, so I saw that it was a bit silly. About the chosen name of the album Total the singer explains: "I worked at every step I was always romantic, but the moment when I live is very big I look for songs related to what I'm living in. more happy, passes the idea of a more complete love". The singer also changed her look for the album, started using a chanel cut and more elegant and discreet clothes, according to her the change came from something internal.

== Songs ==
The first track was "Não Tô Pronta Pra Perdoar", version of "Not Ready to Make Nice" by the American country groupDixie Chicks. Wanessa also sings a duet with the Italian Gigi D'Alessio in the song "A Heart In Love ", a version of the song "Un Cuore Malato", a duet between D'Alessio and singer Lara Fabian. The CD is known as the most mixed of rhythms, from forró ("Me Pega de Jeito"), country ("Demais"). The singer signed seven of the fifteen compositions recorded in the album, and in the bonus track "Me Abrace", added to the album in 2008, Wanessa composed the Portuguese excerpts of the song. In addition, the song "Apareceu Você" (composed and written by Wanessa herself) that is dedicated to her husband Marcos Buaiz. In addition to "Não Tô Pronta Para Perdoar", Total also brings the song "Independente (Ladies Night)", which was part of the soundtrack of the soap opera Beleza Pura, Rede Globo, Total was relaunched in 2008, containing as a bonus track, the song "Me Abrace", sung by Wanessa in partnership with the Mexican trio Camila.

== Track listing ==
No.	Title	Writer(s)	Length
1.	"Vivo Por Mim (Looking For Me)"	Wanessa Camargo; Jason Deere; Keith Follesé	3:27
2.	"Apareceu Você"	Karla Aponte; César Lemos; Wanessa Camargo	3:20
3.	"Amuleto Protetor"	César Lemos; Karla Aponte	3:26
4.	"Eu Nasci Só Pra Você"	Val Martins; Sérgio Knust; Zé Enrique; Marcelão	4:05
5.	"Não Tô Pronta Pra Perdoar"	Milton Guedes; Natalie Maines; Emily Robison; Dan Wilson	3:52
6.	"Independente (Ladies Night)"	César Lemos; Karla Aponte; Wanessa Camargo	3:03
7.	"Eu Voltei (23 Days)"	Wanessa Camargo; Jason Deere; Keith Follesé	3:59
8.	"Me Abrace"	Mario Alberto Domínguez Zarzar; Wanessa Camargo	3:47
9.	"Me Pega De Jeito"	Alvaro Socci	3:36
10.	"Só Se Vive Uma Vez (Emma)"	Jason Deere; Cláudio Rabello	4:09
11.	"Sorte"	Wanessa Camargo; César Lemos; César Augusto	3:47
12.	"Estou Em Suas Mãos"	Frederico; Cristiano	4:16
13.	"Demais"	Wanessa Camargo; César Lemos; Zezé di Camardo	3:11
14.	"Vi Anjos"	João Ramalho	4:07
15.	"Um Coração Apaixonado (Un Cuore Malato)" (with Gigi D'alessio)	Gigi D’Alessio; Adriano Penino; Mogol; Fernando Mello	4:25
Total length:			56:30

Bonus track re-release
No.	Title	Writer(s)	Length
16.	"Me Abrace" (with Camila)	Mario Alberto Domínguez Zarzar; Wanessa Camargo	3:49

=== CD Zero ===
Total (CD Zero) was an extended play with the main tracks of the album, released at the same time that the full-length recording.

1. Não Tô Pronta Pra Perdoar
2. Independente (Ladies Night)
3. Me Abrace (Abrázame)
4. Apareceu Você
5. Me Pega de Jeito

== Credits ==
Art Direction – Sérgio Bittencourt
Mastered by – Carlos Freitas
Mixed by – Silvio Richetto
Photography by – Gui Paganini
Producer – César Lemos, Jason Deere
Recorded by – Silas, Silvio Richetto
