= Felipe Dylon =

Brazilian pop singer

Felipe Dylon (born July 23, 1987) is a Brazilian pop singer. His debut self-titled album was certified gold by ABPD and contained the song "Musa do Verão", an early 2000s hit in Brazil.

== Discography ==
=== Albums ===
- 2002 Felipe Dylon
1. "Deixa Disso"
2. "Pura Pressão"
3. "Me Liga"
4. "Onda Perfeita"
5. "Mais Perto de Mim"
6. "D+"
7. "Não"
8. "Só Penso em Você"
9. "Hoje a Noite Não Tem Luar"
10. "Qual Vai Ser"
11. "Musa do Verão"
12. "Vem Ficar Comigo"
- 2004 Amor de Verão
1. "Pé na Estrada"
2. "Um Amor de Verão"
3. "Shock"
4. "Nunca Ninguém"
5. "Eu Quero Você Pra Mim"
6. "Sem Você Nada é Igual (No Puedo Olvidar)"
7. "Faço Tudo Para Você Me Notar"
8. "Ciúme de Você"
9. "Deixa Disso"
10. "Musa do Verão"
11. "Mais Perto de Mim (Close to Me)"
- 2006 Em Outra Direção
1. "Acorda Brasil"
2. "Dona da Praia"
3. "Quero Você (Te Necessito)"
4. "Por Tudo Que Eu Tenho"
5. "Vai Ver o Sol Nascer"
6. "Todo Mundo"
7. "Logo no Primeiro Dia"
8. "Dorme Nua"
9. "Bússola da Intuição"
10. "Odeio Amar Você"
11. "Você É o Paraíso"
12. "Ano Novo Lunar"
13. "Em Outra Direção"
14. "Em Outra Direção" (bonus track; music video)

=== Singles ===
Year	Single	BRA	Album
2003	"Deixa Disso"	12	Felipe Dylon
2003	"Mais Perto de Mim"	16	Felipe Dylon
2004	"Musa do Verão"	2	Amor de Verão
2004	"Um Amor de Verão"	12	Amor de Verão
2005	"Ciume de Você"	46	Amor de Verão
2006	"Quero Você"	34	Em Outra Direção
2006	"Em Outra Direção"	60	Em Outra Direção
2013	"Ano Novo Lunar"(feat. Lulu Santos)	—	TBA
2015	"Hoje Eu Acordei"	—	TBA
2016	"Ligação Astral"	—	TBA

=== DVD ===
- 2003 Nas Internas
1. "Deixa Disso"
2. "Musa do Verão"
3. "Onda Perfeita"
4. "Só Penso rm Você (I'm All About You)"
5. "Qual Vai Ser (Keep on Movin')"
6. "Pura Pressão"
