= High School Musical: A Seleção =

- Country of origin: Brazil
- No. of seasons: 1
- No. of episodes: 15

Production
- Running time: 60 minutes

Original release
- Network: Disney Channel Brazil; SBT
- Release: March 15 – June 21, 2008

Disney's High School Musical: A Seleção (Disney's High School Musical: The Selection) is a reality television game show, which debuted March 15, 2008 on Disney Channel Brazil.

Its objective is to find an actor and an actress to perform in the movie High School Musical: O Desafio. It is aired on Saturdays, at 7 pm and it is aired on Canal SBT too.

Renata Ferreira and Olavo Cavalheiro were named the winners on the Season Finale, where it was June 21, 2008. Paula Barbosa and Felipe Guadanucci, were the runners-up.

== Judges ==
Function	Judge
Dancing	Tati Sanches
Singing	Ronnie Kneblewski
Acting	Jonathas Joba

== Top 18 Contestants ==
Male	Female

Name	Age	Hometown	Status
Renata Ferreira	22	Rio de Janeiro	Winner
Olavo Cavalheiro	17	São Paulo	Winner
Paula Barbosa	22	Belo Horizonte	Runner-Up
Fellipe Guadanucci	23	São Paulo	Runner-Up
Karolina Cândido	19	Belo Horizonte	Eliminated in Episode 15
Moroni Cruz	19	Balneário Camboriú	Eliminated in Episode 15
Beatriz Machado	23	São Paulo	Eliminated in Episode 15
Samuel Nascimento	21	Guarulhos	Eliminated in Episode 15
Pamela Otero	22	São Paulo	Eliminated in Episode 12
Júnior Wolt	23	São Paulo	Eliminated in Episode 12
Lenora Hage	22	Rio de Janeiro	Eliminated in Episode 10
João Victor Amado	22	Santos	Eliminated in Episode 10
Carolina Calheiros	21	São José dos Campos	Eliminated in Episode 09
Bernardo Falcone	22	Rio de Janeiro	Eliminated in Episode 09
Yasmim Manaia	17	Santos	Eliminated in Episode 08
Eduardo Gil	23	Rio de Janeiro	Eliminated in Episode 08
Alessandra Rocha	24	São Paulo	Eliminated in Episode 07
Luiz Daniel Bianchin	19	Foz do Iguaçu	Eliminated in Episode 07

== Call-out order ==
Ronnie's Callout Order
Order	Ep 5	Ep 6	Ep 7	Ep 8	Ep 9	Ep 10	Ep 11	Ep 12	Ep 13	Ep 14	Ep 15	
01	Eduardo	Karol	Karol	Paula	Renata	Pamela	Júnior	Samuel	Moroni	Beatriz	Paula	Renata
02	Moroni	Yasmim	Yasmim	Karol	Lenora	Paula	Fellipe	Olavo	Renata	Samuel	Fellipe	Olavo
03	Pamela	Olavo	Olavo	Júnior	Victor	Olavo	Samuel	Renata	Olavo	Paula	Renata	Paula
04	Victor	Carolina	Beatriz	Victor	Olavo	Júnior	Moroni	Paula	Karol	Olavo	Olavo	Fellipe
05	Karol	Beatriz	Eduardo	Carolina	Moroni	Samuel	Olavo	Fellipe	Samuel	Renata	Karol	
06	Bernardo	Eduardo	Samuel	Bernardo	Paula	Renata	Pamela	Karol	Paula	Fellipe	Moroni	
07	Renata	Samuel	Renata	Fellipe	Júnior	Fellipe	Karol	Moroni	Fellipe	Karol	Beatriz	
08	Fellipe	Renata	Fellipe	Lenora	Karol	Beatriz	Paula	Beatriz	Beatriz	Moroni	Samuel	
09	Paula	Fellipe	Moroni	Moroni	Beatriz	Moroni	Beatriz	Júnior				
10	Olavo	Moroni	Lenora	Beatriz	Fellipe	Karol	Renata	Pamela				
11	Beatriz	Daniel	Paula	Samuel	Pamela	Victor						
12	Samuel	Lenora	Júnior	Renata	Samuel	Lenora						
13	Carolina	Paula	Pamela	Olavo	Carolina							
14	Daniel	Júnior	Bernardo	Beatriz	Bernardo							
15	Lenora	Pamela	Carolina	Eduardo								
16	Júnior	Bernardo	Victor	Yasmim								
17	Yasmim	Victor	Leka									
18	Leka	Leka	Daniel									

The contestant was in bottom 3
The contestant was in bottom 2
The contestant was eliminated
The contestant won the competition

== Statistics ==
- Contestants with the most collective bottom two appearances: Carolina, Victor & Moroni, 2 times
- Contestants with the most consecutive bottom two appearances: Beatriz & Moroni, 2 times
- Contestants with the most collective bottom three appearances: Beatriz, 3 times
- Contestants with the most consecutive bottom three appearances: Beatriz & Samuel, 2 times
- Contestants with no bottom three appearance: Paula
- Contestants with no bottom two appearance: Paula, Fellipe & Renata
- Contestants with most collective first callouts: Karol, Paula, & Renata, 2 times
- Contestants with most consecutive first callouts: Karol, 2 times
