= High School Musical (book series) =

The first book in the High School Musical series, was High School Musical: the Junior Novel, the novelization of the successful first film was released early June 2006, by Disney Press. This novel hit number one on the New York Times best-selling list best-selling list and remained on the list for sixteen weeks. As of August 2007, the novel has sold more than 4.5 million copies with 1 million copies of the novel's follow-up, High School Musical 2: The Junior Novel, being shipped to American retailers. Shortly after the success of the original novel, Disney announced that a book series, entitled Stories From East High, would be published in February 2007 with a new book being published every 60 days until July 2008. However, books from the series have been scheduled for publication after the originally announced date. A complete list of books is provided below:

== List of books ==
=== Novels ===
The following are the novelizations of each individual film from the series.

No.	Name	Date released	Written by
1	High School Musical	June 1, 2006	N.B. Grace
2	High School Musical 2	August 14, 2007	N.B. Grace
3	High School Musical 3: Senior Year	September 23, 2008	N.B. Grace

=== Stories from East High ===
This book series is considered separate from the novelizations, although they do acknowledge events from the novels as well as from other books within the series.

No.	Book name	Date released	Written by
1	Battle of The Bands	January 16, 2007	N.B. Grace
2	Wildcat Spirit	March 20, 2007	Catherine Hapka
3	Poetry in Motion	May 22, 2007	Alice Alfonsi
4	Crunch Time	July 31, 2007	N.B. Grace
5	Broadway Dreams	September 25, 2007	N.B. Grace
6	Heart to Heart	November 27, 2007	Helen Perelman
7	Friends 4Ever?	February 26, 2008	Catherine Hapka
8	Get Your Vote On!	April 22, 2008	Alice Alfonsi
9	Ringin' It In	August 26, 2008	N.B. Grace
10	Turn Up the Heat	October 28, 2008	Helen Perelman
11	In The Spotlight	December 23, 2008	Catharine Hapka
12	Bonjour, Wildcats!	February 24, 2009	N.B. Grace
13	Game On	April 28, 2009	Sarah Nathan
14	Lights, Camera, Action	July 21, 2009	N.B. Grace

==== Super Special Series ====
This series takes place in the same canon as the Stories from East High, but are roughly double the length of the other books.

No.	Book name	Date released	Written by
1	Under the Stars	June 3, 2008	Helen Perelman
2	Shining Moments	April 28, 2009	Helen Perelman
