= Você não Perde por Esperar =

EP by Wanessa
- Released: September 11, 2010
- Recorded: 2010
- Genre: EDM; electropop
- Length: 12:52
- Label: Sony Music
- Producer: Mr. Jam

Wanessa chronology
Meu Momento (2009)	Você não Perde por Esperar (2010)	DNA (2011)

Você não Perde por Esperar (English: You Can Hardly Wait) is an EP by Brazilian recording artist Wanessa. It was marketed entirely through digital download, not released as a physical product. The project is a partnership between Wanessa and designer Planet Girls, which is the poster girl to sell the songs in music ticket, card method with code to download, very commercialized in countries like the United States. The EP, which contains four new songs, was released during the singer's show at Citibank Hall in São Paulo on September 11, 2010. On June 29, 2010, was released the lead single, Falling for U, a partnership with Mr. DJ Jam, and on 9 September 2010, were released simultaneously as second and third singles, "Worth It" and "Stuck on Repeat".

== Development ==
The project entirely in English, incorporates closer to electronic dance music style, genre aimed at nightclubs and discos never seen before on an album of the singer. Besides being a partnership between Wanessa and Planet Girls brand, which is poster girl. The EP, containing four new songs, was released during the show the singer at Citibank Hall in São Paulo on September 11, 2010.

== Track listing ==
No.	Title	Writer(s)	Length
1.	"Falling for U"	Mr. Jam	3:23
2.	"Worth It"	Michael Jay, Johnny Pedersen, Mary Little	3:06
3.	"Party Line"	Wanessa	3:11
4.	"Stuck on Repeat"	Andre Lindal, Alexander James & Michael Jay	3:12
