= Meu Momento =

Studio album by Wanessa
- Released: June 1, 2009
- Genre: Pop; R&B
- Length: 63:02
- Language: Portuguese; English
- Label: RCA; Sony Music

Wanessa chronology
Total (2007)	Meu Momento (2009)	Você Não Perde Por Esperar (2010)

Singles from Meu Momento
- 1. "Fly" Released: April 7, 2009; 2. "Não Me Leve a Mal (Let Me Live)" Released: December 2, 2009

Meu Momento (English: My Moment) is Wanessa's sixth studio album (seventh overall) released on June 1, 2009. The music was a hit on the radio. The second track was "Não Me Leve a Mal (Let Me Live)", a song that mixes English and Portuguese, and also enjoyed success on Brazilian radio. Produced by the renowned DJ Deeplick, the repertoire left aside the romantic focus of the previous work of the singer, being more directed to the musical trends worldwide, such as electro-pop and rhythm and blues, inspired by Felipe Harmata's folk songs.

The album spawned two singles: "Fly" was the lead-single and reached #1 on radios stations and features the American rapper Ja Rule. Wanessa sings the song in English. "Não Me Leve a Mal (Let me Live)" was released as the second single in November 2009.

== Composition ==
The album is a differential in relation to the composers. Deeplick wrote most of the songs, along with Marcelo Mira, which left Jason Deere, César Lemos, and Karla Aponte (their longtime partners) completely out of the album. Lu Cardoso (wife of presenter Fausto Silva) wrote 2 songs, while Wanessa herself wrote only 3 songs. In "Fly" Wanessa tells about her musical trajectory. "Gosto Tanto", "Sentindo a Minha Vida", "Como eu Te Quis", "Vou Propor", and "Te Beija" have themes of romantic relationships in their most different formats. In "Desejos", "Perdeu", and "Dono da Noite" the theme is the woman and her own desires. "Do not Take Me Alone" talks about resentment of betrayal and revenge. "Máquina Digital" makes an analogy to consumerism. "O Que Vem do Reggae é Bom" and "Me Leva" tell about enjoying the night and dancing. "Things of Life" has as its theme the experience of life that each carries.

== Release ==
Several presentations to launch and drive the release were made; the official launch of the CD took place at Domingão do Faustão. A surprise presentation was made at the nightclub The Week to publicize her new music style in which she made a memorable cover performance of the hit "Just Dance" by Lady Gaga, leading the audience to madness. After that there were several invitations to other presentations that originated the Tour Balada who toured Brazil. Wanessa made her first appearance with her own single in the Best Music Video and competed in the categories Best Pop Video and Hit of the Year with "Fly".

She participated in the event Fashion Rocks singing "Fly", "Take Me", and "not evil". In the same event she presented the singers Mariah Carey, Grace Jones and Ciara. Due to the success of "Fly" on the radio, Wanessa was invited to open shows of Florianópolis and Rio de Janeiro during the singer Beyoncé's I Am... World Tour Brazil. Her set had 6 tracks highlighting "Fly" and served to introduce the new style Wanessa to an essentially more pop audience.

== Critical reception ==
The album received mixed reviews. Columnist Gilberto Tenório of O Grito! wrote, "The first single from Meu Momento already makes clear the option for this new phase. "Fly" could very well be on a CD by some American R&B singer." But the final evaluation was negative for the album, saying that Wanessa tries to look more modern, but ends up with no self-identity and "a handful of disposable songs" on the album, citing "Desejos" as robotic, "Gosto Tanto" generic, and "Do Not Get Me Wrong" classified as "of dubious tastes like "my head is not a step."" He praises Wanessa's intention for new sonorities, and even finds a style of her own, but that resulted in a "handful of disposable songs". Critic Mauro Ferreira from the "Musical Notes" column commented that the production of Deeplick and Denilson Miller tries to insert Wanessa into the pop scene, but for him the album "sounds artificial like the beats that surround Wanessa's voice, giving the impression that the twist was planned in its smallest detail in the marketing room of Sony Music".

Edwin Leroy of LuxoLana's website said the compositions are weak and that Wanessa "still sins in song lyrics - some seem to be more childish than the image Wanessa seems to keep today," but praises the entries, saying that this was the positive step of the album.

== Track listing ==
No.	Title	Writer(s)	Length
1.	"Fly"	Wanessa Camargo, Deeplick, Denilson Miller, Marcelo Mira, Jeffrey Atkins, Samille Joker	4:02
2.	"Gosto Tanto"	Deeplick	3:32
3.	"Desejos"	Deeplick, Denilson Miller, Marcelo Mira	4:09
4.	"Não Me Leve a Mal (Let Me Live)"	Camargo, Deeplick, Denilson Miller, Marcelo Mira, Samille Joker	3:43
5.	"Sentido a Minha Vida"	Camargo, Lu Cardoso, Deeplick	4:32
6.	"Dono da Noite"	Thereza Blota, Deeplick, Marcelo Mira	3:45
7.	"Máquina Digital"	Deeplick, Dudy, Mira	3:12
8.	"Vou Propor"	Mônica Agüena, Lu Cardoso, Nana Rizinni	3:17
9.	"Perdeu (Physical)"	Renato Pagliacci, Karen T.	3:21
10.	"Te Beijar"	Alexandre Carlo	3:55
11.	"O Que Vem do Reggae é Bom"	Camargo, Deeplick, Rick Dub, Mira	3:11
12.	"Como Eu Te Quis"	Camargo, Pagliacci, Karen T.	3:23
13.	"Coisas da Vida"	Rita Lee	4:51
14.	"Me Leva"	Camargo, Deeplick, Thereza Blota	3:16
15.	"Meu Momento"	Camargo, Deeplick, Miller, Mira, Atkins, Joker	3:50
