= List of shipwrecks in December 1886 =

The list of shipwrecks in December 1886 includes ships sunk, foundered, grounded, or otherwise lost during December 1886.

== 1 December ==
List of shipwrecks: 1 December 1886
Ship	State	Description
Challenger	United Kingdom	The ship departed from London for Jersey, Channel Islands. No further trace, reported overdue.
Colonel Milliken	United States	The schooner was wrecked on the Morant Cays. She was on a voyage from Maracaibo, Venezuela to Boston, Massachusetts.
Gustave	France	The schooner was abandoned off Scarborough, Yorkshire, United Kingdom. Her crew were rescued by the Scarborough Lifeboat. Gustave was on a voyage from Saint-Valery-sur-Somme, Somme to South Shields, County Durham, United Kingdom. She subsequently drove ashore 2 nautical miles (3.7 km) north of Scarborough.
Kentish Knock Lightship	Trinity House	The lightship was rammed by the barque Palawan (United Kingdom) and sank in the North Sea off the Kentish Knock . Her crew were rescued by Palawan.

== 2 December ==
List of shipwrecks: 2 December 1886
Ship	State	Description
Arcana	United Kingdom	The ship departed from Newport, Monmouthshire for Dunmore East, County Waterford. No further trace, reported missing.
Ariadne	Canada	The schooner was wrecked in a gale in Mexico Bay four miles (6.4 km) from Stony Point near Oswego, New York with the loss of three of her six crew. Survivors were rescued by the United States Life Saving Service.
Marianninha	Portugal	The barque capsized in the Douro.
Ocean Bride	(United Kingdom of Great Britain and Ireland) Guernsey	The ship was run into by the steamship Beryl (United Kingdom) and sank in the River Thames at Greenwich, Kent with the loss of four of her nine crew.
Republic	United States	The ship was wrecked 1 nautical mile (1.9 km) west of Dunkirk, Nord, France. She was on a voyage from Philadelphia, Pennsylvania to Dunkirk.

== 3 December ==
List of shipwrecks: 3 December 1886
Ship	State	Description
Augusta	United Kingdom	The coaster ran aground on the Carbery Rock, in Dumanus Bay and was wrecked. She was on a voyage from Bantry to Kilcrohane, County Cork.
Tamaris	France	The ship departed from Bordeaux, Gironde for Noumea, New Caledonia. No further trace, reported missing.
Unebi	Imperial Japanese Navy	The cruiser departed from Singapore, Straits Settlements for Yokohama. She was assumed to have subsequently foundered in the South China Sea during a typhoon. No wreckage or survivors were found.

== 4 December ==
List of shipwrecks: 4 December 1886
Ship	State	Description
Argos	United Kingdom	The steamship ran aground on the North Perch, off the coast of Ayrshire and sank. She was on a voyage from Belfast, County Antrim to Irvine, Ayrshire.
D.H. Ingraham	United States	The schooner ran aground in a gale/snowstorm in Hereford Inlet, New Jersey. Her crew were rescued as the ship's cargo of lime caught fire, she was a total loss. She was on a voyage from Rockland, Maine to Richmond, Virginia.
Ispahan	United Kingdom	The ship was wrecked at Hangklip, Cape Colony. All on board survived. She was on a voyage from Calcutta, India to London.
Malabar	United Kingdom	The ship departed from Cardiff, Glamorgan for Rio de Janeiro, Brazil. No further trace, reported missing.
Mary Capper	United Kingdom	The schooner and collided with J. H. Henks (Flag unknown) and sank off Black Head, Cornwall. Her crew were rescued by J. H. Henks. Mary Capper was on a voyage from Penryn, Cornwall to Belfast, County Antrim.
Snowdrop	United Kingdom	The steamship departed from Newcastle upon Tyne, Northumberland for Kingstown, County Dublin. No further trace, reported overdue.
Tom Morton	United Kingdom	The steamship departed from Cardiff for Odesa, Russia. No further trace, reported overdue.

== 5 December ==
List of shipwrecks: 5 December 1886
Ship	State	Description
Cymro	United Kingdom	The steamship was sighted whilst on a voyage from Newcastle upon Tyne, Northumberland to Genoa, Italy. Presumed subsequently lost in the Bay of Biscay with all 26 crew.
Edith	(Dominion of Newfoundland) Newfoundland Colony	The schooner was wrecked on a reef off Miquelon with the loss of all thirteen people on board. She was on a voyage from Newfoundland to Miquelon.

== 6 December ==
List of shipwrecks: 6 December 1886
Ship	State	Description
Cicerone	United Kingdom	The schooner collided with the brig Juanita (United Kingdom) and foundered in the North Sea off the coast of Yorkshire with the loss of a crew member. Survivors were rescued by Juanita.
Constanze	Germany	The ship ran aground on the Longsand, in the North Sea off the coast of Essex, United Kingdom. Her nineteen crew were rescued by the Walton Lifeboat. Constanze was refloated and taken in to Harwich in a derelict condition by the steamship Harwich (United Kingdom).
Copenhagen	DenmarkUnited Kingdom	The steamship suffered a breakage of her propeller shaft and was holed. She was abandoned off the Horn Reef, in the North Sea with the loss of five of her nineteen crew. Survivors were rescued by the smack Primrose (United Kingdom). Copenhagen was on a voyage from Copenhagen to Antwerp, Belgium.

== 7 December ==
List of shipwrecks: 7 December 1886
Ship	State	Description
Grange Fell	United Kingdom	The steamship departed from Fowey, Cornwall for Liverpool, Lancashire. No further trace, reported overdue.
Sisters	United Kingdom	The brig sprang a leak and foundered in the Irish Sea 10 nautical miles (19 km) south south east of the North Arklow Lightship ( Trinity House). Her crew reached the lightship in a boat. They were rescued on 10 December.

== 8 December ==
List of shipwrecks: 8 December 1886
Ship	State	Description
Agnes Minde	Denmark	The ship sank in the Skaggerak. Her crew were rescued by Samson (United Kingdom).
Alliance	United Kingdom	The ketch was driven ashore at Chyandour, Cornwall. Her crew were rescued by the Penzance Lifeboat.
Ann and Maria	United Kingdom	The ketch struck the pier at Lowestoft, Suffolk and sank. Her crew were rescued. She was on a voyage from Goole, Yorkshire to Maidstone, Kent.
Aradus	Germany	The brig was driven ashore at Helsingør, Denmark. She was on a voyage from Memel to the Natal Colony. She was refloated with the assistance of a steamship and taken in the Helsingør in a leaky condition.
Bornholmskeg	Denmark	The yacht was driven ashore and wrecked at Helsingør.
Carmen	Spain	The brig was driven ashore and wrecked at Falmouth, Cornwall. Her crew were rescued.
C. H. Marshall	United States	The ship ran aground on the Brake Sand. She was refloated with assistance from the tug Challenger (United Kingdom) and towed in to the River Thames.
Desirée	France	The schooner was driven ashore and wrecked at Dungeness, Kent with the loss of all hands.
Dunlin	United Kingdom	The steam trawler was driven ashore and wrecked at Lossiemouth, Moray with some loss of life.
Golden Light	United Kingdom	The schooner was driven ashore at Chyandour. Her crew were rescued by the Penzance Lifeboat.
Henrietta	United Kingdom	The steamship was driven ashore at Kingston by Sea, Sussex. Her crew were rescued by the Coastguard and villagers. She was on a voyage from Amsterdam, North Holland, Netherlands to Cardiff, Glamorgan.
Hilkea	Germany	The schooner was driven ashore and wrecked at Helsingør. She was on a voyage from Vyborg, Grand Duchy of Finland to Bremen.
James and Elizabeth	United Kingdom	The fishing boat capsized off Hythe, Kent with the loss of five of her seven crew. She subsequently came ashore.
Johannes	Germany	The brig was driven ashore and wrecked at Helsingør. Her crew were rescued. She was on a voyage from Sundsvall, Sweden, to Leith, Lothian, United Kingdom.
J. S.	United Kingdom	The barquentine was driven ashore at Port Talbot, Glamorgan. Her crew survived.
Ocean Queen	(United Kingdom of Great Britain and Ireland) Jersey	The brigantine was driven ashore on Jersey. She was on a voyage from Swansea, Glamorgan to Saint-Brieuc, Côtes-du-Nord, France.
Peter	Sweden	The brig was driven ashore and severely damaged at Helsingør. She was on a voyage from Sweden to Hartlepool, County Durham, United Kingdom.
Rachel Lotinga	United Kingdom	The ship ran aground in The Downs. She was on a voyage from Swansea to Newhaven, Sussex. She was refloated and taken in to Ramsgate, Kent in a leaky condition.
Rover	United Kingdom	The ship was wrecked at Tenby, Pembrokeshire.
Sarah Dixon	United Kingdom	The schooner foundered 2 nautical miles (3.7 km) off Bonmahon, County Waterford with the loss of all four crew.
Saring	Russia	The schooner was driven ashore at Helsingør. Her crew were rescued. She was on a voyage from Gävle, Sweden to Great Yarmouth, Norfolk, United Kingdom.
Scharhorn	Germany	The schooner was driven ashore at "Hamblehak". She was on a voyage from Hull, Yorkshire to Rostock.
Superb	Sweden	The schooner was driven ashore at Helsingør. Her crew were rescued. She was on a voyage from Sweden to Sunderland, County Durham. She was a total loss.
Wietska	Netherlands	The schooner was driven ashore at Southend-on-Sea, Essex, United Kingdom. Her crew were rescued by the Southend Lifeboat.
W. M. J.	United Kingdom	The ship was driven ashore and wrecked at "Colmonstown", County Clare.
RX 3	United Kingdom	The fishing boat capsized off Hythe, Kent with the loss of all but one of her crew. She subsequently came ashore at Dymchurch.
Unnamed	France	The brigantine was driven ashore and wrecked at Dymchurch, Kent, United Kingdom with the loss of all hands.
Unnamed	Flag unknown	The schooner ran aground and sank on the Gunfleet Sand, in the North Sea off the coast of Essex. All hands were presumed lost.
Unnamed	Flag unknown	The schooner foundered off Milford Haven, Pembrokeshire. Unknown if crew were aboard, but they were presumed to have been lost if aboard.
Unnamed	Flag unknown	The ship foundered in Dungarvan Bay.
Unnamed	Flag unknown	The ship was wrecked on the Ridge Sand, in the English Channel.

== 9 December ==
List of shipwrecks: 9 December 1886
Ship	State	Description
Agenora	United Kingdom	The fishing trawler foundered off Tenby, Pembrokeshire. Her crew were rescued by the Tenby Lifeboat Henry Dodd ( Royal National Lifeboat Institution).
Alliance	United Kingdom	The ship was wrecked on the seaward side of the Albert Pier, Penzance, Cornwall, England.
Avondale	United Kingdom	The steamship was driven ashore at Holyhead, Anglesey. She was on a voyage from Liverpool, Lancashire to Newport, Monmouthshire. She was refloated and taken in tow for Liverpool by two tugs.
Captain McClintock	United Kingdom	The steamship foundered off Amlwch, Anglesey, United Kingdom with the loss of all hands.
Carron	United Kingdom	The steamship was driven ashore at Stranraer, Wigtownshire.
Constance Ellen	United Kingdom	The ship collided with John Hall (United Kingdom) and drove ashore at Milford Haven, Pembrokeshire.
Convivial	United Kingdom	The ship was driven ashore at Milford Haven. She was on a voyage from Le Tréport, Seine-Inférieure, France to Runcorn, Cheshire.
Dagmar	Norway	The barque was driven ashore at Holyhead.
Earls Court	United Kingdom	The barque was driven ashore at Margam, Glamorgan with the loss of four of her crew. She was on a voyage from Newport to Australia.
Economist	United Kingdom	The coal hulk was driven ashore at Milford Haven. She was refloated.
Eliza Fernley	Royal National Lifeboat Institution	After launching from Southport, Lancashire, the lifeboat capsized during a gale in the Irish Sea with the loss of fourteen of her sixteen crew while trying to reach the crew of the barque Mexico (German Empire), which was wrecked off Southport.
Emma Alice	United Kingdom	The schooner was driven ashore at Glin, County Limerick.
Endeavour	United Kingdom	The ship was wrecked at Pwllheli, Caernarfonshire.
Eugenie	United Kingdom	The ship was driven ashore and severely damaged at Milford Haven. She was on a voyage from Newport to Dungarvan, County Antrim.
Figaro	Germany	The barque was driven ashore and wrecked in Freshwater Bay, Pembrokeshire with the loss of all hands.
Fremad	Norway	The barque was driven ashore at Steart, Somerset, United Kingdom. Her eight or ten crew were rescued by the Burnham Lifeboat Cheltenham ( Royal National Lifeboat Institution). Fremad was on a voyage from Nova Scotia, Canada to Bristol, Gloucestershire, United Kingdom.
George D. Fullerton	United Kingdom	The ship was driven ashore at Milford Haven. She was on a voyage from Cardiff, Glamorgan to Cork.
Gowerian	United Kingdom	The schooner was driven ashore at Milford Haven.
Hercules	United Kingdom	The ship was driven against the pier and damaged at Sharpness, Gloucestershire.
Henry Florence	United Kingdom	The ship was abandoned off Scrabster, Caithness. Her crew were rescued by the Thurso Lifeboat.
Hero	United Kingdom	The ketch was driven ashore at Milford Haven.
James Blink	United Kingdom	The ship was wrecked at Pwllheli.
John and Ann	United Kingdom	The ship was wrecked at Pwllheli.
Laura Janet	Royal National Lifeboat Institution	After launching from St Annes, Lancashire, the lifeboat capsized during a gale in the Irish Sea with the loss of all thirteen of her crew while trying to reach the crew of the barque Mexico (German Empire), which was wrecked off Southport.
Louise H. Fuller	Canada	The ship was abandoned in the Atlantic Ocean and set afire. Her crew were rescued by Fulda (United Kingdom).
Lyra	United Kingdom	The ship was abandoned off Scrabster. Her crew were rescued by the Thurso Lifeboat.
Margaret Garton	United Kingdom	The ship was abandoned off Scrabster. Her crew were rescued by the Thurso Lifeboat.
Margaret Hobley	United Kingdom	The ship was driven ashore at Milford Haven. She was on a voyage from Rodney to Cork.
Mexico	Germany	Mexico The barque was wrecked at Southport. All twelved of her crew were saved by the Lytham lifeboat Charles Biggs ( Royal National Lifeboat Institution). Mexico was on a voyage from Liverpool to Guayaquil, Ecuador. She was later repaired and returned to service.
Nathaniel	United Kingdom	The schooner was driven ashore and wrecked at Milford Haven. Her crew were rescued. She was on a voyage from Newport to Cork.
Neiro	United Kingdom	The dandy was driven ashore at Milford Haven. She was refloated.
Oliver	United Kingdom	The dandy was driven ashore and severely damaged at Milford Haven. She was on a voyage from Cardiff to Waterford.
Pegasus	United Kingdom	The ship was abandoned off Holyhead. Her 21 crew were rescued by the Holyhead Lifeboat Thomas Fielden ( Royal National Lifeboat Institution). Pegasus was on a voyage from Liverpool to Doboy, Georgia, United States.
Petrel	United Kingdom	The schooner was driven ashore and wrecked at Trevose Head, Cornwall with the loss of her captain. She was on a voyage from Livorno, Italy to Leith, Lothian.
Psyche	United Kingdom	The schooner was driven ashore at Neath, Glamorgan. Her crew were rescued.
Queen	United Kingdom	The ketch was driven ashore and wrecked at Milford Haven.
Rebecca	United Kingdom	The schooner was driven ashore and wrecked at Milford Haven.
Roycroft	United Kingdom	The barque was driven ashore on M'Kinney's Bank, off the coast of County Donegal. She was refloated, but was driven ashore at Moville, County Donegal. She was again refloated.
Sarah Ann	United Kingdom	The ship capsized and sank at Runcorn.
Scotian	United Kingdom	The schooner was driven ashore at Pwllheli. Her crew were rescued.
Secret	United Kingdom	The ship was driven ashore at Milford Haven. Her crew were rescued. She was refloated.
Stella	Netherlands	The steamship was driven ashore at IJmuiden, North Holland. Her crew were rescued. she was on a voyage from a Mediterranean port to Amsterdam, North Holland.
T. Crowley	United Kingdom	The steamship was driven ashore and wrecked at Renard Point, County Kerry. Her crew were rescued.
Thomas	United Kingdom	The ship struck the wreck of Sarah Ann (United Kingdom) and sank at Runcorn. She was on a voyage from Liverpool to Widnes, Cheshire.
Tourmaline	United Kingdom	The ship was abandoned in the Atlantic Ocean. Her crew were rescued by Nubian (United Kingdom).
Wild Rose	Norway	The brigantine was driven ashore near Criccieth, Caernarfonshire. Her crew were rescued. She was on a voyage from Quebec City, Canada to Portmadoc, Caernarfonshire.
Wish	United Kingdom	The brig was driven ashore at Milford Haven. She was refloated and found to be severely leaky.
Two unnamed vessels	Flags unknown	The ships were driven ashore at Milford Haven.
Unnamed	Flag unknown	The ship was wrecked at Pwllheli.
Unnamed	Flag unknown	The ship was wrecked on the Goodwin Sands, Kent.
Two unnamed vessels	Flags unknown	The ships were driven ashore and wrecked at Dungeness.
Unnamed	United Kingdom	The smack was driven ashore and wrecked at Abersoch, Caernarfonshire with the loss of both crew.
Two unnamed vessels	United Kingdom	The Mersey flats sank in the River Mersey downstream of Weston Point Docks, Cheshire with the loss of five lives.

== 10 December ==
List of shipwrecks: 10 December 1886
Ship	State	Description
Elizabeth	United Kingdom	The brigantine was driven ashore and wrecked at Redcar, Yorkshire. Her crew were rescued. She was on a voyage from Seaham, County Durham to Portsmouth, Hampshire.
Falke	Norway	The brig foundered off "San Francisco Island" with the loss of all hands, according to a message in a bottle picked up at sea by the gunboat Loanza (Imperial Brazilian Navy). Falke was on a voyage from Cardiff, Glamorgan, United Kingdom to Paraná, Brazil.

== 11 December ==
List of shipwrecks: 11 December 1886
Ship	State	Description
Balnacraig	United Kingdom	The steamship collide with the steamship Karo (United Kingdom) and sank in the North Sea 15 nautical miles (28 km) east north east of the North Foreland, Kent. Her crew were rescued. Balnacraig was on a voyage from Antwerp, Belgium to London.
John Liddell	United Kingdom	The steamship departed from Blyth, Northumberland for Hamburg, Germany. No further trace, reported overdue.
Lizzy	United Kingdom	The schooner was driven ashore at "Zuidkragert". She was refloated and taken in to Vlissingen, Friesland, Netherlands.

== 12 December ==
List of shipwrecks: 12 December 1886
Ship	State	Description
Carl Ritter	Germany	The ship was driven ashore at Havre de Grâce, Seine-Inférieure, France. She was on a voyage from Rouen, Seine-Inférieure to Cardiff, Glamorgan, United Kingdom.
Darley	United Kingdom	The schooner was abandoned in the North Sea. Her crew were rescued by a Belgian ship. She was subsequently towed in to Ostend, West Flanders, Belgium.

== 13 December ==
List of shipwrecks: 13 December 1886
Ship	State	Description
Hermon	United Kingdom	The ship ran aground and sank in the Seine at Honfleur, Manche, France.
J. M. White	United States	The steamship was destroyed by fire at Bayou Bars, Louisiana with the loss of between 28 and 50 lives.
Richmond	United States	The steamship was destroyed by fire at Saint Maurice Plantation on the Mississippi River. Five passengers and five crew died.

== 14 December ==
List of shipwrecks: 14 December 1886
Ship	State	Description
Samanco	United Kingdom	The ship was driven ashore at Corrig's Perch, County Wexford. Nine crew made shore in the ships boat, and the remaining nine crew were rescued by the Carnsore lifeboat.

== 15 December ==
List of shipwrecks: 15 December 1886
Ship	State	Description
Chios, and Naranja	Greece; United Kingdom	The steamship Chios collided with the steamship Naranja and sank off Cape St. Vincent, Portugal. Her crew were rescued. Chios was on a voyage from Taganrog, Russia to Altona, Germany. Naranja was on a voyage from Swansea, Glamorgan to Alicante, Spain. She put in to Lisbon, Portugal.

== 16 December ==
List of shipwrecks: 16 December 1886
Ship	State	Description
L.C.A.	United Kingdom	The brigantine was abandoned off Cape Finisterre, Spain. Her crew were rescued by Onwy Belle (United Kingdom). L.C.A. was on a voyage from Mazagan, Cuba to Plymouth, Devon.
Venco	United Kingdom	The steamship sprang a leak and was beached at Egremont, Lancashire. She was on a voyage from Garston, Lancashire to Brixham, Devon.

== 17 December ==
List of shipwrecks: 17 December 1886
Ship	State	Description
Balgownie	United Kingdom	The steamship was driven ashore in the River Thames at Barking, Essex. She was on a voyage from London to the River Tyne.
King Arthur, and Zuari	United Kingdom	The ships collided at Bombay, India. King Arthur was severely damaged. Zuari sank. She was refloated in January 1887.
L	United Kingdom	The steamship foundered 5 nautical miles (9.3 km) south of the Cumbrae Lighthouse, Ayrshire. Her crew survived. She was on a voyage from Girvan, Ayrshire to Glasgow, Renfrewshire.
Storm Queen	United Kingdom	The steamship was driven ashore near Bridgwater, Somerset. She was on a voyage from Londonderry to Cardiff, Glamorgan. She was refloated the next day with the assistance of a number of tugs.

== 18 December ==
List of shipwrecks: 18 December 1886
Ship	State	Description
Pall Mall	United Kingdom	The Thames barge was run into by the steamship Capella (Germany) and sank in the River Thames at Rainham, Essex.
Plantagenet	United Kingdom	The steamship ran aground at Llanelly, Glamorgan. She was on a voyage from Workington, Cumberland to Llanelly.
Sheppy	United Kingdom	The barge was driven ashore near Reculver, Kent. Her crew survived.
Wave Green	Canada	The ship was abandoned in the Atlantic Ocean (40°10′N 21°50′W) and set afire. Her crew were rescued by the steamship Devonshire (United Kingdom).

== 19 December ==
List of shipwrecks: 19 December 1886
Ship	State	Description
Arabella	United Kingdom	The schooner was driven ashore and wrecked at Safi, Morocco. Her crew were rescued.
Eos	United Kingdom	The barquentine was driven ashore and wrecked at Safi. Her crew were rescued.
Excelsior	United Kingdom	The schooner was driven ashore and wrecked at Safi. Her crew were rescued.
Helene	Germany	The dandy was driven ashore and wrecked at Safi. Her crew survived.
Jasper	United Kingdom	The barquentine was driven ashore and wrecked at Safi. Her crew were rescued.
Johann	Germany	The ship was driven ashore and wrecked at Safi. Her crew survived.
Nymph	United Kingdom	The ship was abandoned in the Atlantic Ocean. Her crew were rescued by the steamship Adara (France).
Polly Mitchell	United Kingdom	The schooner was driven ashore and wrecked at Safi. Her crew were rescued.
Shoreham	United Kingdom	The steamship was driven ashore at Whitburn, County Durham. Her crew were rescued by the Whitburn Lifeboat.

== 20 December ==
List of shipwrecks: 20 December 1886
Ship	State	Description
Draga D	Austria-Hungary	The barque was abandoned in the Atlantic Ocean with the loss of one of her twelve crew. Survivors were rescued by the barque Bolivia (United Kingdom). Draga D. was on a voyage from New York, United States to Lisbon, Portugal.
France	France	The steamship was severely damaged by fire at sea with the loss of three lives. She put in to Martinique.

== 21 December ==
List of shipwrecks: 21 December 1886
Ship	State	Description
Cormorant	United Kingdom	The steamship ran aground near St Catherine's Point, Isle of Wight and was wrecked. She was abandoned the next day. She was on a voyage form New Orleans, Louisiana, United States to Bremerhaven, Germany.
John G. Fletcher	United States	The steamship struck a snag and sank in the Red River at Shady Grove Landing, 15 miles (24 km) upstream of Shreveport, Louisiana with the loss of a crew member. She was a total loss.
Mahommed-Es-Sadock	France	The steamship was wrecked at Port-Vendres, Pyrénées-Orientales. All on board were rescued.

== 22 December ==
List of shipwrecks: 22 December 1886
Ship	State	Description
Hope Still	United Kingdom	The barge was run into by the steamship Raven (United Kingdom) and sank in the River Thames at Blackwall, Middlesex.
Jubilee	United Kingdom	The ship ran aground off Puffin Island, Anglesey. Her crew were rescued by a lifeboat. She was on a voyage from Liverpool, Lancashire to Dundalk, County Louth. She was refloated and taken in to Beaumaris, Anglesey.
Madeleine	France	The ship was driven ashore at Winchelsea, Sussex. Her nine crew were rescued by the Coastguard. She was on a voyage from Dunkirk, Nord to Saint-Malo, Ille-et-Vilaine.

== 23 December ==
List of shipwrecks: 23 December 1886
Ship	State	Description
Anne	United Kingdom	The barge was run into by the steamship Catanas (United Kingdom) and sank at Limehouse, Middlesex.
Tar	United Kingdom	The schooner was abandoned off the Galloper Sand. Her crew were rescued by the pilot boat No. 5 (Netherlands). Tar was on a voyage from Amsterdam, North Holland, Netherlands to London.

== 24 December ==
List of shipwrecks: 24 December 1886
Ship	State	Description
Annie C. Maguire	United Kingdom	The barque was wrecked and sank at the Portland Head Lighthouse, Maine.
Aurora	United Kingdom	The schooner ran aground at Portland, Dorset. She was refloated with the assistance of a tug and found to be leaky.
HMS Monarch	Royal Navy	The ironclad was run into by HMS Minotaur (Royal Navy) in the Tagus and was severely damaged.
Onward	United Kingdom	The ship departed from Muckross, County Cork for London. No further trace, reported overdue.
Ville de Victoria	France	Ville de Victoria The steamship was run into by HMS Sultan (Royal Navy and was holed by the ironclad's spur ram. She sank in the Tagus off Lisbon, Portugal with the loss of 30 of the 60 people on board. Ville de Victoria was on a voyage from Havre de Grâce, Seine-Inférieure to Santos, Brazil.

== 25 December ==
List of shipwrecks: 25 December 1886
Ship	State	Description
Ashdell	United Kingdom	The steamship caught fire at sea. She was on a voyage from Brunswick, Georgia, United States to Liverpool, Lancashire. The fire was extinguished and she completed her voyage.

== 26 December ==
List of shipwrecks: 26 December 1886
Ship	State	Description
Commerce	United Kingdom	The ketch was run down and sunk in the English Channel off the South Foreland, Kent by the barque F. H. von Lindern (Netherlands). Her four crew were rescued by F. H. von Lindern.
Edmund Marie	France	The schooner foundered in the English Channel west of Rye, Sussex, United Kingdom with the loss of three of her four crew. She was on a voyage from Boulogne, Pas-de-Calais to Rochefort, Charente-Inférieure.
Frigga	United Kingdom	The schooner was driven ashore and wrecked at Dungeness, Kent. Two of her six crew were rescued, four were reported missing. She was on a voyage from Porsgrund to Plymouth, Devon, United Kingdom.
Joutsen	(Russian Empire) Grand Duchy of Finland	The barque was driven ashore and wrecked at Dover, Kent with the loss of three of her thirteen crew. She was on a voyage from Rotterdam, South Holland, Netherlands to an American port.
RMS Medway	United Kingdom	The steamship was driven ashore 1 nautical mile (1.9 km) east of Yarmouth, Isle of Wight. All on board were taken off by tugs.
Pauline	France	The dandy was driven ashore and wrecked near New Romney, Kent. Two of her five crew were reported missing. She was on a voyage from Dunkirk, Nord to Brest, Finistère.
Tally Ho	United Kingdom	The brig sprang a leak in the English Channel and was beached at Eastbourne, Sussex.with the loss of four of her eight crew. Survivors were rescued by the Coastguard and by lifeboatmen. She was on a voyage from Sunderland, County Durham to Littlehampton, Sussex.
Valhalla	Norway	The brig was driven ashore and wrecked at Dungeness. Her crew were rescued.
Unnamed	France	The ship was driven ashore and wrecked at Dymchurch, Kent. Two of her crew were reported missing.
Unnamed	Norway	The barque foundered in the English Channel off New Romney, Kent with the loss of all hands.
Unnamed	Flag unknown	The shipfoundered in the English Channel off New Romney with the loss of all hands.
Unnamed	flag unknown	The schooner was driven ashore and sank at the Anvil Point Lighthouse, Dorset.
Two unnamed vessels	United Kingdom	The ships were driven ashoree at Studland, Dorset.

== 27 December ==
List of shipwrecks: 27 December 1886
Ship	State	Description
Albion	United Kingdom	The steam flat suffered an engine failure and ran aground off Bangor, Caernarfonshire. Her crew were rescued by the Bangor Lifeboat.
Day Star	United Kingdom	The schooner was driven ashore at Aldeburgh, Suffolk. Her five crew were rescued; four by the Southwold Lifeboat and one by the Dunwich Lifeboat Code Exchange ( Royal National Lifeboat Institution).
Magnet	United Kingdom	The ship was driven ashore at Aldeburgh with the loss of all but one of her seven crew. The survivor was rescued by rocket apparatus.
Tricksey Wee, or Trixie Wee	United Kingdom	The ship was driven ashore and wrecked at Aldeburgh. Her seven crew were rescued.
Valhalla	Norway	The barque was driven ashore and wrecked at Dungeness, Kent, United Kingdom. Her crew were rescued.

== 28 December ==
List of shipwrecks: 28 December 1886
Ship	State	Description
Aeriel	United Kingdom	The ship was driven ashore at Bacton, Norfolk. Her crew survived.
Richard and Emily	United Kingdom	The ship foundered in the Bristol Channel 2 nautical miles (3.7 km) south south west of Nash Point, Glamorgan. Her crew were rescued. She was on a voyage from Highbridge, Somerset to Swansea, Glamorgan.

== 29 December ==
List of shipwrecks: 29 December 1886
Ship	State	Description
Leila	United Kingdom	The schooner was run down and sunk off Trevose Head, Cornwall by the steamship Alacrity (United Kingdom) with the loss of three of her four crew. The survivor was rescued by Alacrity Leila was on a voyage from Newport, Monmouthshire to Newquay, Cornwall.

== 30 December ==
List of shipwrecks: 30 December 1886
Ship	State	Description
Agnes Louise	United Kingdom	The steamship was driven ashore at Atherfield, Isle of Wight. She was refloated the next day and resumed her voyage.
Eva	United Kingdom	The fishing trawler was run down and sunk off Kingstown, County Dublin by the steamship Eva (United Kingdom). Her crew were rescued by Eva.
Richard K. Fox	United States	The schooner was wrecked at North Chatham, Massachusetts. Her crew were rescued.

== Unknown date ==
List of shipwrecks: Unknown date in December 1886
Ship	State	Description
Acaster	United Kingdom	The ship ran aground on the Bridge Rock, off Newbiggin-by-the-Sea, Northumberland.
Achilles	United Kingdom	The ship was driven ashore at Höganäs, Sweden. She was on a voyage from Oskarshamn, Sweden to Liverpool, Lancashire. She was refloated and taken in to Helsingør, Denmark.
Alice	Flag unknown	The steamship was driven ashore in the Bahamas. She was on a voyage from Galveston, Texas, United States to Bremen, Germany. She was refloated and taken in to Nassau, Bahamas.
Allertown	United States	The steamship ran aground in a gale.
Anne C. Maguire	Argentina	The barque was driven ashore and wrecked at Cape Elizabeth, Maine, United States.
Atlantic	United States	The whaler was driven ashore and wrecked at San Francisco, California. Some of her crew were reported missing.
Aurora	Denmark	The schooner was driven ashore on Skagen. She was on a voyage from Saint Davids, Pembrokeshire, United Kingdom to Karrebaekminde.
Axel	Germany	The schooner ran aground at Bahia, Brazil. She was on a voyage from Hamburg to Bahia. She was refloated and taken in to Bahia in a leaky condition.
Beatrice	United Kingdom	The schooner was driven ashore at Teelin Head, County Donegal.
Bengore Head	United Kingdom	The ship was damaged at Livorno, Italy.
Ben Macdui	United Kingdom	The steamship ran aground on the Haisborough Sands, in the North Sea off the coast of Norfolk. She was refloated and towed in to Lowestoft, Suffolk by a number of tugs and the Caister Lifeboat.
Brunhild	Denmark	The full-rigged ship was driven ashore at Petten. She was on a voyage from Hamburg to Amsterdam, North Holland, Netherlands.
Camellia	United Kingdom	The schooner was driven ashore at Portland, Dorset.
Canton	China	The ship collided with at coaster and was driven ashore at Shanghai. She was refloated and taken in to Shanghai.
Caroline	Germany	The schooner was abandoned at sea. She was on a voyage from Helsingborg, Sweden to Hull, Yorkshire, United Kingdom.
Charlotte	United Kingdom	The ship was lost at Mandal, Norway. She was on a voyage from Pori, Grand Duchy of Finland to Grimsby, Lincolnshire.
Constantin	Germany	The schooner was driven ashore at Rivez Point, Spain.
Cremona	United States	The ship was abandoned in the Atlantic Ocean. Her crew were rescued. She was on a voyage from Accra, Gold Coast to Boston, Massachusetts.
Cydonia	Flag unknown	The ship was driven ashore at the mouth of the Savannah River.
Czar	Norway	The schooner was wrecked on the Swedish coast. She was on a voyage from Falkenburg, Sweden to an English port.
Eagle Wing	United Kingdom	The schooner was driven ashore at Ramsgate, Kent. She was on a voyage from Whitstable to Ramsgate.
Earl's Court	United Kingdom	The ship ran aground on the Margam Shoals, in the Bristol Channel. She was on a voyage from Newport, Monmouthshire to Albany, New York, United States. She was refloated on 27 December.
Edmond Gabrielle, and Never Despair	France (United Kingdom of Great Britain and Ireland) Guernsey	The barque Edmond Gabrielle collided with the brig Never Despair off Barfleur, Manche. Her crew were rescued by Never Despair which was subsequently abandoned. Edmond Gabrielle was on a voyage from Havre de Grâce, Seine-Inférieure to French Equatorial Africa. She subsequently came ashore at Lancing, Sussex, United Kingdom and was wrecked. The wreck entirely broke up on 8 December.
Elise	Norway	The ship was driven ashore and damaged at Farsund. She was on a voyage from "St. Davies" to Königsberg, Germany.
Ellen	United Kingdom	The barge was run into by the steamship Glengair (United Kingdom) and sank in the River Thames at Greenwich, Kent with the loss of her captain.
Ethelwolf	United Kingdom	The steamship was abandoned off the Silleiro Rocks. Her crew were rescued.
Euphony	United Kingdom	The barque was abandoned in the Atlantic Ocean with the loss of three of her crew. Survivors were rescued by the barque Albatros (Germany). Euphony was on a voyage from Demerara, British Honduras to London.
Fanny	United Kingdom	The Thames barge sank in Egypt Bay, Kent with the loss of both crew. She was on a voyage from Milton Regis, Kent to London.
Fawn	United Kingdom	The steamship foundered off Holyhead, Anglesey with the loss of all hands. She was on a voyage from Llanelly, Glamorgan to London.
Forto	Norway	The barque was beached in the Cocos Islands. Her crew were rescued. She was on a voyage from Rotterdam, South Holland, Netherlands to Java, Netherlands East Indies.
Fortunate	United Kingdom	The barge was run into by the steamship Blonde (United Kingdom) and sank in the River Thames at Gravesend, Kent. Her crew were rescued.
France	France	The barque was driven ashore at Hope Point. She was on a voyage from Bordeaux, Gironde to Fécamp, Seine-Inférieure. She was refloated and assisted in to Dover, Kent by a tug.
Franklin	Norway	The barque ran aground off Martín García Island, Uruguay. She was on a voyage from Newport, Monmouthshire to Rosario, Argentina.
General Napier	United Kingdom	The steamship ran aground in the Seine and broke in two. Her crew were rescued.
General Rye	United Kingdom	The ship was wrecked in the Bahamas. She was on a voyage from Pensacola to Liverpool.
Gler	Norway	The barque caught fire at Savannah, Georgia, United States.
Gordon	United Kingdom	The schooner was driven ashore at Natal, Brazil.
Grant	Norway	The barque ran aground at Pernambuco, Brazil. She was on a voyage from Natal, Brazil to New York, United States. She was refloated and taken in to Pernambuco in a leaky condition.
Greetlands	United Kingdom	The ship ran aground at L'Isle-aux-Coudres, Quebec, Canada. She was on a voyage from Cow Bay, Nova Scotia to Quebec City, Canada.
Guanito	Italy	The barque foundered off the coast of Pembrokeshire with the loss of all twelve crew.
Haze	Germany	The ship was abandoned at sea. Her crew were rescued. She was on a voyage from Progresso to Hamburg.
Helena	United Kingdom	The steamship struck a submerged object in the Mississippi River and sprang a leak.
Helen Nicholl, and Keilawarra	United Kingdom; New South Wales	The steamship Keilawarra collided with the steamship Helen Nicholl and sank in Trial Bay with the loss of 36 lives. Keilawarra was on a voyage from Sydney to Brisbane, Queensland. Helen Nicholl was severely damaged with the loss of six lives. She was on a voyage from Clarence to Sydney. She completed her voyage.
Hilma	Sweden	The schooner was driven ashore. She was on a voyage from Newcastle upon Tyne, Northumberland to Helsingborg. She was refloated and taken in to Gothenburg in a leaky condition. She was placed under repair.
Hoy Head	United Kingdom	The steamship was driven ashore on the Great Stone Point, Kent. She was on a voyage from Dunkirk, Nord, France to Cardiff, Glamorgan. She was refloated on 6 December and taken in to Dover, Kent.
Industry	United Kingdom	The ship was driven ashore and wrecked at Rush, County Dublin with the loss of three of her four crew. She was on a voyage from Liverpool to Wicklow.
Insulaneren	Denmark	The ship was driven ashore. She was refloated and anchored at Torekow, Sweden.
Inverallan	United Kingdom	The ship was lost near the Île-de-Batz, Finistère, France. She was on a voyage from an American port to Hamburg.
Isabella Pratt	United Kingdom	The schooner was driven ashore and wrecked at Saltfleet, Lincolnshire.
Ivanhoe	United Kingdom	The steamship ran aground in the Clyde at Greenock, Renfrewshire. She was refloated on 30 December and resumed her voyage.
Jane and Ellen	United Kingdom	The schooner was driven ashore and wrecked on Walney Island, Lancashire. She was on a voyage from Liverpool to Ulverston, Lancashire.
John and Ann	United Kingdom	The schooner was driven ashore at Rostrevor, County Down.
Jorgen Olsen	Denmark	The ship was driven ashore and wrecked. She was on a voyage from Rudkøbing to Weymouth, Dorset, United Kingdom.
Joseph Dexter	United Kingdom	The brigantine collided with another vessel and was driven ashore at Colugh Point, Glamorgan. Her crew survived.
Jura	United Kingdom	The brig was damaged by ice and became waterlogged off Reedy Island, Delaware, United States.
Kooringa	United States	The ship ran aground at Astoria, Oregon. She was refloated four days later.
Kryolith	United Kingdom	The barque was lost at sea with the loss of a crew member.
Lapwing	Russia	The schooner was driven ashore. She was on a voyage from Riga to Queensferry, United Kingdom. She was refloated and taken in to Helsingør.
Lark	United Kingdom	The fishing boat was driven ashore and wrecked at Arklow, County Wicklow. Her crew were rescued.
Laurel	United Kingdom	The fishing smack was abanedon in the North Sea off Texel, North Holland, Netherlands. Her crew were rescued by the steamship Reiher (Germany).
Leslie	Flag unknown	The hulk was destroyed by fire at Corinto.
Lizzie	United Kingdom	The steamship ran aground in the River Witham. She was on a voyage from Alexandria, Egypt to Boston, Lincolnshire.
Louis et Marie	United Kingdom	The barque ran aground on the Rocas Atoll. She was refloated and taken in to Pará, Brazil in a leaky condition and was placed under repair.
Lubentia	United Kingdom	The schooner was driven ashore at the Rammekens Castle, Zeeland, Netherlands. She was refloated and taken in to Vlissingen, Zeeland.
Macedonian	United Kingdom	The brig was driven ashore in the River Thames between Tilbury and Grays, Essex.
Margaret Jane	United Kingdom	The schooner was wrecked on the South Carr Rocks with the loss of all hands. She was on a voyage from Aberdovey, Merionethshire to Aberdeen.
Marianne	Sweden	The ship was driven ashore at Kristiansand, Norway. She was on a voyage from Sundsvall to Philadelphia, Pennsylvania, United States.
Maria Repetto Figlia	Italy	The barque was driven ashore and wrecked. Her crew were rescued by Lilydale (United Kingdom). Maria Repetto Figlia was on a voyage from Darien, Georgia, United States to Genoa. She was later refloated and towed in to Cádiz, Spain in a waterlogged condition.
Marie Antoinette	Netherlands	The barque was abandoned off Cherbourg, Manche. Her crew were rescued. She was on a voyage from Rouen, Seine-Inférieure to Philadelphia.
Mary Helen	United States	The whaler caught fire at San Francisco and was beached. She was a total loss.
Mathilde	France	The brig sank at Havre de Grâce. She was on a voyage from Boulogne, Pas-de-Calais to Livorno.
Matilda	United Kingdom	The fishing boat was driven ashore at Arklow. Her crew were rescued.
Maylath	Austria-Hungary	The barque was driven ashore at "Marzocco", Italy. Her crew were rescued.
Minerve	Austria-Hungary	The steamship was driven ashore at "Galata Bournov", Ottoman Empire.
Mountaineer	United Kingdom	The ship caught fire at sea and was abandoned. Her crew were rescued. She was on a voyage from Hull to Wilmington, California, United States.
Navarch	United Kingdom	The ship ran aground on the Romer Shoals. She was on a voyage from New York to Liverpool. She was refloated and found to be leaky.
Neptun	Germany	The galiot was abandoned at sea. She was subsequently towed in to Fredrikshavn, Denmark.
Neptun	Germany	The schooner was damaged by fire at Gijón, Spain.
Nile	United Kingdom	The brigantine was wrecked at Redcar, Yorkshire. She was on a voyage from Great Yarmouth, Norfolk to Seaham, County Durham.
Old Goody	United Kingdom	The brigantine was driven ashore at Ramsgate. She was on a voyage from Whitstable to Ramsgate.
Ondine	United Kingdom	The schooner was driven ashore at Westgate-on-Sea, Kent. Her crew were rescued.
Orb	United Kingdom	The brig was driven ashore and wrecked at Bridlington, Yorkshire. Her crew were rescued by the Bridlington Lifeboat.
Otterburn	United Kingdom	The ship was destroyed by fire off Maldonado, Uruguay. Her crew were rescued by the steamship Acongagua (United Kingdom). Otterburn was on a voyage from Dundee, Forfarshire to San Francisco.
Paul	France	The schooner was wrecked at Berck-sur-Mer, Pas-de-Calais.
Pensiers	Italy	The barque sank at Livorno. Her crew were rescued.
Perseverance	United Kingdom	The steamship was driven ashore in the River Thames near the Scar Beacon. she was on a voyage from Cardiff to London.
Pinios	Greece	The lighted collided with Hawthorn (United Kingdom) and was beached at Brăila, Romania.
Queen of Usk	United Kingdom	The brigantine was driven ashore at Drummore, Wigtownshire. Her crew were rescued.
Racer	United Kingdom	The barque was wrecked on Flint Island, Nova Scotia, Canada.
Reliance	United Kingdom	The smack sank in the North Sea. Her crew survived.
Reval	Germany	The steamship ran aground on the Banjaard Sand, in the North Sea off the coast of Zeeland. Her crew were rescued by Burgsluis (Netherlands).
Rough Diamond	Canada	The schooner capsized in the Bay of Fundy with the loss of all hands.
Salerno	United Kingdom	The steamship ran aground at Gothenburg. She was on a voyage from Gothenburg to New York.
Salamanca	Flag unknown	The ship was driven ashore at Rehoboth Beach, Delaware. Her crew were rescued.
Seamew	United Kingdom	The ship was wrecked at "Port Alfans", Wigtownshire.
Scotsman	United Kingdom	The ship was driven ashore near Newport. Her crew were rescued. She was on a voyage from Rotterdam to Liverpool. Scotsman was scuttled on 20 December.
Sheikh	Flag unknown	The ship was severely damaged at Livorno.
Sir Jamsetjee Family	United Kingdom	The ship was driven ashore and wrecked at Point Grenvill, Washington Territory. Her crew survived.
Summer Cloud	United Kingdom	The smack was driven ashore on Stronsay, Orkney Islands. Her crew were rescued. She was on a voyage from Lerwick, Shetland Islands to Kirkwall, Orkney Islands.
Summerlee	United Kingdom	The steamship was driven ashore and wrecked at Bilbao, Spain.
Susan Glenllian	United Kingdom	The ship was driven ashore and damaged at Llangrannog, Merionethshire.
Susie Kyffet	United States	The ship was driven ashore at Scituate, Massachusetts. She was on a voyage from Saint John, New Brunswick, Canada to New York. She was a total loss.
Sutlea	United Kingdom	The steamship was driven ashore at Lemvig, Denmark. She was on a voyage from Burntisland, Fife to Danzig, Germany.
Suzanne	France	The steamship was wrecked on the La Mauvaise Bank, at the mouth of the Gironde. Her crew were rescued.
Swift	Norway	The brig was driven ashore and wrecked at Cresswell, Northumberland.
Victorine	France	The schooner put in to Plymouth, Devon, United Kingdom in a sinking condition and was beached in Sutton Pool. She was on a voyage from Fowey, Cornwall, United Kingdom to Nantes, Loire-Inférieure.
Vigilant	Norway	The steamship was abandoned at sea. Her crew were rescued by the steamship Girdleness (United Kingdom). Vigilant was on a voyage from Stavanger to Königsberg, Germany.
Vigilant	Norway	The barque was driven ashore and wrecked in the Seine.
William	United Kingdom	The brigantine was driven ashore and wrecked at Newcastle, County Down. Her crew were rescued. She was on a voyage from Drogheda, County Louth to Ayr.
William Knox	United Kingdom	The ketch was driven ashore and wrecked on the Hudson Skews. Her crew were rescued by rocket apparatus. She was on a voyage from Sunderland, County Durham to Buckie, Banffshire.
Yan Ysen	United Kingdom	The steamship was wrecked was wrecked on the Salthouse Bank, in the Irish Sea off the coast of Lancashire. Her crew were rescued by a lifeboat. She was on a voyage from Montrose, Forfarshire to Fleetwood, Lancashire.
Ystwyth	United Kingdom	The schooner was severely damaged at New Quay, Carmarthenshire. She was struck by a sea and broke her back.
Zephyr	Sweden	The steamship was driven ashore and wrecked. She was on a voyage from Gothenburg to Christiania, Norway.
Unnamed	Belgium	The dredger was run into by the steamship Amanda (United Kingdom) and sank at Ostend, West Flanders.
Unnamed	Greece	The schooner was driven ashore at Calambrone, Italy. Her crew were rescued.
Unnamed	United Kingdom	The brigantine was driven ashore in the River Thames between Tilbury and Grays.
