= Mexico (disambiguation) =

Mexico is a country in North America.

Mexico may also refer to:

== Geography ==
=== Australia ===
- Mexico, Queensland, a locality in the Barcaldine Region

=== Mexico ===
- Mexico City (México, D.F.; Ciudad de México; Distrito Federal)
- State of Mexico (Estado Libre y Soberano de México; México)

=== Philippines ===
- Mexico, Pampanga, a municipality in the Philippines

=== United States ===
- Mexico, Indiana
- Mexico, Kentucky
- Mexico, Maine, a New England town
  - Mexico (CDP), Maine, the main village in the town
- Mexico, Allegany County, Maryland
- Mexico, Carroll County, Maryland
- Mexico, Missouri
- Mexico, New York
  - Mexico (village), New York, within the town
- Mexico, Ohio
- Mexico, Juniata County, Pennsylvania
- Mexico, Montour County, Pennsylvania
- Mexico, Texas

== Music ==
=== Albums ===
- Mexico (EP), by Böhse Onkelz
- Mexico (GusGus album), 2014
- México (Julio Iglesias album), 2015
- ¡México!, a 2010 album by Rolando Villazón
- Mexico, a 2006 album by Jean Leclerc
- Mexico EP, a 2011 EP by The Staves
- México, México (album), a 2006 compilation album by various artists

=== Songs ===
- "Mexico" (instrumental), a 1961 composition by Bob Moore
- "Mexico" (Butthole Surfers song), 2001
- "Mexico" (Dimitri Vegas & Like Mike song), 2023
- "Mexico" (Elvis Presley song), 1963
- "Mexico" (James Taylor song), 1975, later covered by Jimmy Buffett
- "Mexico" (Jefferson Airplane song), 1970
- "México, México" (song), a song by RBD for the Mexico national football team in the 2006 FIFA World Cup
- "Mexico", a song by 12 Rods from the extended play Gay?
- "Mexico", a song by Abhi the Nomad from Abhi vs the Universe
- "Mexico", a song by Alestorm from their album No Grave But the Sea
- "Mexico", a song by Cake from the album Prolonging the Magic
- "Mexico", a song by Carrie Underwood from the album Storyteller
- "Mexico", a song by Firefall from the album Firefall
- "Mexico", a song by Incubus from the album Morning View
- "Mexico", a song by Jireel
- "Mexico", a song by Katrina and the Waves from Katrina and the Waves 2
- "Mexico", a song by Les Humphries Singers
- "Mexico", a song by Long John Baldry
- "Mexico", a song by Dschinghis Khan
- "México", a song by Maná from their album Maná
- "México", a song by Mexican Institute of Sound from his album Político
- "Mexico", a song by Morrissey from You Are the Quarry
- "Mexico", a song by Murcof and Erik Truffaz
- "Mexico", a song by Nazareth from their album 2XS
- "Mexico", a song by the Dead Daisies from Revolución
- "México", a song by Timbiriche from La Banda Timbiriche
- "M-E-X-I-C-O", a song by Post Malone from F-1 Trillion

== Other ==
- For ships of this name see List of ships named Mexico
  - Wreck of the Mexico (1837), a ship wrecked off the coast of Long Island, New York on January 2, 1837
  - Southport and St Anne's lifeboats disaster, in which a ship named Mexico wrecked at Southport on December 9, 1886
  - Mexico, an 1851 sidewheel paddle steamer that served in the Confederate and Union navies as General Bragg
- Mexico (cartoon), a 1930 Walter Lantz cartoon
- Mexico (game), a dice game
- Mexico (beetle), a genus of beetles
- Mexico (novel), a novel by James A. Michener
- Ron Mexico, an alias for NFL player Michael Vick
- México, a sculpture by Josep Maria Subirachs created for the Ruta de la Amistad in Mexico City

== See also ==
- Mex (disambiguation)
- Mexican (disambiguation)
- Mexico City (disambiguation)
- Mexique (disambiguation)
- New Mexico (disambiguation)
- Moxico (disambiguation)
