= Wreck of the Mexico =

Wreck of the Mexico may refer to:

- Wreck of the Mexico (1837), off the coast of Long Island, New York, the United States
- Southport and St Anne's lifeboats disaster, involving the wrecking of the German barque Mexico off the coast of Southport and Lytham St Annes in the United Kingdom in 1886

== See also ==
- Mexico (disambiguation)
