= List of ships named Mexico =

A number of ships have been named Mexico, including:

== Warships ==
- ARM Mexico (1874), a 445-ton gunboat of the Mexican Navy

== Merchant ships ==
- Mexico (c.1826), a barque wrecked on Long Island in January 1837
- Mexico (1851), a sidewheel paddle steamer that later served in the Confederate and Union navies as General Bragg
- Mexico (1860), an iron barque wrecked at Southport on 9 December 1886
- Mexico (1882), a passenger-cargo steamship connecting US Pacific north-west ports with Alaska, wrecked in 1897
- Mexico (1884), a Spanish Transatlantic passenger-cargo steamship
- Mexico (1890), a passenger-cargo steamship, built as Sobraon, and renamed when chartered for the Transatlantic services of Atlantic Transport Line; wrecked in 1895
- Mexico (1899), a passenger steamship of the New York and Cuba Mail Steamship Company, later wrecked in Alaska as Yukon
- Mexico (1905), a passenger-cargo steamship of French Line, operated on routes to the USA and Mexico
- Mexico (1906), a passenger steamship of the New York and Cuba Mail Steamship Company, later Aleutian
- Mexico (1912), an Argentinian coastal passenger-cargo steamship in service until 1958
- Mexico (1913), a Mexican coastal passenger steamer, wrecked in 1937
- Mexico (1920), an oil tanker that struck a mine in the North Sea and sank with a loss of 32 crew
