= Mexican town =

Mexican town or Mexican Town may refer to:

- Municipalities of Mexico
- Mexican Town, Arizona, an area now part of Ajo
- Mexicantown, Detroit

== See also ==
- Mexico (disambiguation) § Geography, any of several localities
