= List of shipwrecks in September 1885 =

The list of shipwrecks in September 1885 includes ships sunk, foundered, grounded, or otherwise lost during September 1885.

== 1 September ==
List of shipwrecks: 1 September 1885
Ship	State	Description
Waveney	United Kingdom	The yacht ran aground and sank on the Brake Sands, in the North Sea. All three people on board survived. She was on a voyage from Lowestoft, Suffolk to Ramsgate, Kent.

== 2 September ==
List of shipwrecks: 2 September 1885
Ship	State	Description
Queen	United Kingdom	The steamship put in to Penzance, Cornwall on fire. She was on a voyage from Cardiff, Glamorgan to Dénia, Spain. The fire was extinguished on 4 September.

== 3 September ==
List of shipwrecks: 3 September 1885
Ship	State	Description
Mazeppa	Norway	The galeas ran aground at the entrance to the Ise Fjord. She was on a voyage from Charlestown, Cornwall, United Kingdom to Roskilde, Denmark.

== 4 September ==
List of shipwrecks: 4 September 1885
Ship	State	Description
Benedicta	Germany	The ship was driven ashore and wrecked at Akassa, Royal Niger Company territory. Her crew survived. She was on a voyage from Hamburg to Akassa.
General Gordon	United Kingdom	The fishing lugger was driven ashore at the North Foreland, Kent.
Lincoln	United Kingdom	The steamship was driven ashore on Oyster Island, County Sligo. She was refloated on 6 September and taken in to Sligo.

== 5 September ==
List of shipwrecks: 5 September 1885
Ship	State	Description
Alice M. Williams	United States	The fishing schooner struck an uncharted rock and sank 2 nautical miles (3.7 km) off "Bildall£, Iceland. Her crew rowed to Bildall in her boats.

== 7 September ==
List of shipwrecks: 7 September 1885
Ship	State	Description
Alpheta	United Kingdom	The ship departed from Adelaide, South Australia for Portland, Oregon, United States. No further trace, reported missing.

== 8 September ==
List of shipwrecks: 8 September 1885
Ship	State	Description
Advance	United States	Advance, 9 June 2022. The 117.3-foot (35.8 m), 179.92-gross register ton schooner sprang a leak and capsized in Lake Michigan 9 nautical miles (10 mi; 17 km) southeast of Sheboygan, Wisconsin, at 43°36.71′N 087°42.973′W. Her six-man crew took to a yawl, which capsized 200 feet (61 m) from shore with the loss of five lives. Her wreck was discovered in 1983 and lies within the Wisconsin Shipwreck Coast National Marine Sanctuary.
Bob Hackett	United States	The tug collided with St. Magnus (United States) and sank in the Detroit River off Bois Blanc Island, Ontario, Canada. Her boiler and engine were salvaged in May 1886. The rest of the wreck was blown up with dynamite.
Director	United Kingdom	The Thames barge was run into by Loch Fergus at Gravesend, Kent. Director then collided with the steamship Bulimba.
Erie	United States	The schooner capsized off Port Colborne, Ontario with the loss of two of the six people on board.
Grove	United Kingdom	The smack was abandoned in the North Sea. Her crew were rescued by the tug Pelican (United Kingdom).
Honour	United Kingdom	The schooner departed from Par, Cornwall for Gloucester. No further trace, reported overdue.
Idlewild, and Loch Fergus	United Kingdom	The steamship Idlewild collided with Loch Fergus and both vessels were severely damaged with much loss of life. Idlewild was on a voyage from London to Penarth, Glamorgan. Loch Fergus was on a voyage from London to Sydney, New South Wales. She was towed in to the River Thames.
Milton	United States	The barge was wrecked at Two Rivers, Wisconsin with the loss of all five crew.

== 9 September ==
List of shipwrecks: 9 September 1885
Ship	State	Description
Coronella	United Kingdom	The brigantine ran aground at Holyhead, Anglesey and was severely damaged. She was on a voyage from Liverpool, Lancashire to Dublin.
Florence Miriam	United Kingdom	The ketch collided with the steamship River Derwent and sank in the River Thames at Northfleet, Kent with the loss of all three crew.
Guardian Angel	(Dominion of Newfoundland) Newfoundland Colony	The fishing schooner capsized off Cape Ballard with the loss of all but one of her crew.
Oakland	United Kingdom	The steamship was run into by SMS Blitz (Imperial German Navy) and sank in the Kattegat with the loss of fifteen of her seventeen crew. Survivors were rescued by SMS Blitz. Oakland was on a voyage from Blyth, Northumberland to Stockholm, Sweden.
Unnamed	Imperial German Navy	The torpedo boat collided with another and sank off Langeland, Denmark with the loss of a crew member.

== 10 September ==
List of shipwrecks: 10 September 1885
Ship	State	Description
Auckland	United Kingdom	The steamship collided with an Imperial German Navy warship and sank in the Kattegat 3 nautical miles (5.6 km) north by east of the Kobbergrund. She was on a voyage from Burntisland, Fife to Tromsø, Norway.

== 11 September ==
List of shipwrecks: 11 September 1885
Ship	State	Description
Acorn	United Kingdom	The Mersey Flat sank at Liverpool, Lancashire. She was on a voyage from Birkenhead, Cheshire to Liverpool. She was refloated.
Amadis	United Kingdom	The steamship was driven ashore on Hogland, Russia. She was refloated.
Glynn	United Kingdom	The brigantine stranded on Hayle bar. Her five crew were rescued by the Hayle Lifeboat Isis ( Royal National Lifeboat Institution). Glynnn was on a voyage from Hayle, Cornwall to Cherbourg, Manche, France.
Lady Frances	United Kingdom	The steamship struck a sunken rock and was wrecked 170 nautical miles (310 km) west of Alexandria, Egypt with the loss of ten of her nineteen crew. She was on a voyage from South Shields, County Durham to Alexandria, Egypt.
Moneta	United Kingdom	The brigantine ran aground on the Haisborough Sands, in the North Sea off the coast of Norfolk. She was on a voyage from Seaham, County Durham to Yarmouth, Isle of Wight. She was refloated and assisted in to Whitstable, Kent in a leaky condition.

== 12 September ==
List of shipwrecks: 12 September 1885
Ship	State	Description
Excel	United Kingdom	The schooner was wrecked on Double Island, off "Cape Harrigan". Her crew were rescued.
Ferdinand Bruhn	Germany	The ship was driven ashore on Inchcape, Fife, United Kingdom. Her crew survived. She was on a voyage from Doboy, Georgia, United States to Dundee, Forfarshire, United Kingdom. She was refloated and towed in to Dundee in a wrecked condition on 16 September.
Harriet Shiel	United Kingdom	The ship was driven ashore on Inchgarvie, Fife. She was on a voyage from Middlesbrough, Yorkshire to Grangemouth, Stirlingshire. She was refloated and taken in to Grangemouth in a leaky condition.
Mary and Jane	United Kingdom	The ship was driven ashore and wrecked at Skerray, Sutherland. Her crew were rescued.
New Emerald	United Kingdom	The fishing lugger was run into by the brigantine Poseidon (Norway) and sank at Scarborough, Yorkshire.

== 13 September ==
List of shipwrecks: 13 September 1885
Ship	State	Description
Rookwood	United States	The ship ran aground at San Francisco, California. She was refloated.

== 14 September ==
List of shipwrecks: 14 September 1885
Ship	State	Description
Haabet	Denmark	The schooner was driven ashore at Margate, Kent, United Kingdom. She was later refloated and towed in to Ramsgate, Kent in a waterlogged condition.
Hermes	United Kingdom	The steamship ran aground off Cape St. Mary with the loss of four of her crew. She was on a voyage from Liverpool, Lancashire to Montevideo, Uruguay. She was a total loss.

== 15 September ==
List of shipwrecks: 15 September 1885
Ship	State	Description
Coumoundoros	United Kingdom	The steamship ran aground on Hastensground, in the Baltic Sea.
Unnamed	Flag unknown	The steamship ran ashore on Læsø, Denmark.

== 16 September ==
List of shipwrecks: 16 September 1885
Ship	State	Description
Corona	United Kingdom	The ship was wrecked on a reef off Prince Head, Java, Netherlands East Indies. Her crew survived. She was on a voyage from Cardiff, Glamorgan to Singapore, Straits Settlements.
Electrico	Italy	The steamship sank off Asinara, Sardinia. Her crew were rescued.
Unnamed	United States	The wrecking schooner sank collided with the tug Fanny P. Sheer (United States) and sank at New York. Two of her crew were reported missing.

== 17 September ==
List of shipwrecks: 17 September 1885
Ship	State	Description
Orient	United States	The barge, under tow of Ranger (United States), lost her towline off the bar at Galveston, Texas, went ashore and was wrecked with the loss of five of her crew.

== 18 September ==
List of shipwrecks: 18 September 1885
Ship	State	Description
Brenda, and Dolphin	United Kingdom	The paddle steamer Dolplhin collided with the steamship Brenda and sank in The Downs a mile (1.9 km) offshore and midway between Walmer Castle and Kingsdown, Kent with the loss of seventeen of the 37 or 38 people on board. Survivors were rescued by the Kingsdown Lifeboat Charles Hargreave ( Royal National Lifeboat Institution) and by boats from Kingsdown. Dolphin was on a voyage from the River Thames to Havre de Grâce, Seine-Inférieure, France. She was subsequently salvaged. Brenda was on a voyage from Bushire, Persia to London. She was severely damaged at the bow and was towed in to Dover, Kent by the tug Granville (United Kingdom). Temporary repairs were made and she was towed to London.
Floretta	United States	Sonar image of the wreck of Floretta, 12 June 2022. During a voyage from Escanaba, Michigan, to Chicago, Illinois, with a cargo of iron ore, the 134-foot (41 m), 259.9-gross register ton canal schooner sprang a leak and sank in 180 feet (55 m) of water in Lake Michigan 11 nautical miles (20 km; 13 mi) southeast of Manitowoc, Wisconsin, at 43°57.24′N 087°32.20′W. Her crew of seven reached Manitowoc safely in a yawl. Her wreck was discovered in 1980 and in 2021 was included in the Wisconsin Shipwreck Coast National Marine Sanctuary.
Flying Cloud	Straits Settlements	The steamship foundered 4 nautical miles (7.4 km) off Pulo Remo. Twenty-five of the 53 people on board were reported missing.
Hannah	United Kingdom	The smack was wrecked near Newhaven, Sussex.

== 19 September ==
List of shipwrecks: 19 September 1885
Ship	State	Description
Annie and Matthew	United Kingdom	The fishing coble capsized off Robin Hoods Bay with the loss of two of her three crew.
Margaret	(United Kingdom of Great Britain and Ireland) Isle of Man	The schooner foundered off the coast of Cumberland with the loss of three of her crew. A would-be rescuer was lost when his boat capsized.

== 20 September ==
List of shipwrecks: 20 September 1885
Ship	State	Description
RMS Etruria	United Kingdom	The ocean liner collided with the steamship Canada (United Kingdom) in Lower New York Bay. She was on a voyage from New York, United States to Liverpool, Lancashire. She continued her voyage.
Helen Pembroke	United Kingdom	The ship was wrecked on North Andaman Island, Andaman Islands in a cyclone. Her crew were rescued. She was on a voyage from Port Blair, Andaman Islands to Calcutta, India.

== 21 September ==
List of shipwrecks: 21 September 1885
Ship	State	Description
Scamandre	France	The steamship collided with the steamship Ortegal and sank off Almería, Spain. Her crew were rescued.
Neustrie	France	The 3 masts wrecked during False Point cyclone (Bay of Bengal) et had been forsaken, François Saboureau captain, shipowner H. Auger. Her crew were rescued.

== 22 September ==
List of shipwrecks: 22 September 1885
Ship	State	Description
H. A. Johnson	United States	The fishing schooner was run down by a barque and sank in the Western Cashe's with the loss of a crew member. Survivors were rescued by the schooner Aroostook (United States).

== 23 September ==
List of shipwrecks: 23 September 1885
Ship	State	Description
Penzance	United Kingdom	The steamship ran aground in the Dardanelles at Kumcale, Ottoman Empire. She was on a voyage from Sulina, Romania to Malta.

== 24 September ==
List of shipwrecks: 24 September 1885
Ship	State	Description
Alexander	India	The tug was severely damaged in a cyclone at False Point.
Booldana	United Kingdom	The steamship was driven ashore in a cyclone at False Point.
Franco Cherie	France	The ship put in to Faial Island, Azores on fire. She was on a voyage from Cochin, India to Bordeaux, Gironde. The fire was extinguished.
Neustrie	France	The barque was wrecked in a cyclone at False Point. Her crew survived.
Tewkesbury	United Kingdom	The ship was driven ashore and wrecked in a cyclone at False Point. She was on a voyage from False Point to Mauritius.
Unnamed	United Kingdom	The ship foundered off the Sandheads, India in a cyclone with the loss of all but two of her crew.
Unnamed	France	The barque was driven ashore and wrecked in a cyclone at False Point.

== 27 September ==
List of shipwrecks: 27 September 1885
Ship	State	Description

== 28 September ==
List of shipwrecks: 28 September 1885
Ship	State	Description
Angelina	Italy	The barque was abandoned in the South Atlantic. Her crew were rescued by Maria T. (Flag unknown). Angelina was on a voyage from Buenos Aires, Argentina to Rouen, Seine-Inférieure, France.
Artiere	Austria-Hungary	The barque struck the breakwater at Trieste and sank. Her crew were rescued. She was on a voyage from Jamaica to Trieste.
Crimus	United Kingdom	The steamship ran aground at the mouth of the River Nene. She was on a voyage from Antwerp, Belgium to Wisbech, Cambridgeshire.
Sarah Ann Widdup	United Kingdom	The schooner ran aground and capsized at Margate, Kent. She was on a voyage from Swansea, Glamorgan to Margate.

== 29 September ==
List of shipwrecks: 29 September 1885
Ship	State	Description
Abraham Sutton	United Kingdom	The steamship was driven ashore at Waterloo, Lancashire. She was on a voyage from Cork to Liverpool, Lancashire.
Elizabeth Graham	United Kingdom	The barque ran aground on the Seven Stones Reef, Cornwall. She was later refloated.

== 30 September ==
List of shipwrecks: 30 September 1885
Ship	State	Description
Accrington	United Kingdom	The ship ran aground on the Gourland Bank, off the coast of County Cork. She was on a voyage from Liverpool, Lancashire to Queenstown, County Cork. She was refloated and then collided with the barque Vallejo (United Kingdom).
Althea	Norway	The schooner was driven ashore at Berwick upon Tweed, Northumberland, United Kingdom.
Amazon	Sweden	The barque ran aground on the Barnard Sand, in the North Sea off the coast of Suffolk, United Kingdom. She was on a voyage from Falmouth, Cornwall to Lowestoft, Suffolk.

== Unknown date ==
List of shipwrecks: Unknown date in September 1885
Ship	State	Description
Alexander Duncan	United States	The barque was driven ashore and wrecked at Fort Point, California.
Arcona	Germany	The schooner was driven ashore on Saltholm, Denmark. She was on a voyage from Danzig to Randers, Norway.
Bertha	Norway	The barque was abandoned at sea. Her crew were rescued.
Britannia	United Kingdom	The ship was wrecked on Langlee Island, Saint Pierre and Miquelon. Her crew were rescued. She was on a voyage from North Sydney, Nova Scotia, Canada to Saint John's, Newfoundland Colony.
Burry	United Kingdom	The steamship was driven ashore at the Point of Slog, Glamorgan.
Calcutta	United Kingdom	The ship ran aground on the Long Sand, in the Hooghly River. She was on a voyage from Buenos Aires, Argentina to Calcutta, India. She was refloated and towed in to Calcutta in a severely leaky condition. She was placed under repair.
Cashmere	United Kingdom	The ship was wrecked on Tanegashima, Japan before 22 September with some loss of life. She was on a voyage from Philadelphia to Hiogo, Japan.
Castor	Netherlands	The steamship was driven ashore on Delos, Greece.
Ceres	United Kingdom	The schooner foundered in the North Sea. Her crew were rescued. She was on a voyage from Newcastle upon Tyne, Northumberland to Fredrikshavn, Denmark.
Charles Howard	United Kingdom	The steamship was severely damaged at Antwerp, Belgium after 8 September.
Colon, and Jean Baptiste Say	Brazil; France	The steamships collided off the mouth of the Guazú and were both severely damaged. Colon was on a voyage from Montevideo, Uruguay to "Assomption". She put in to Rosario de Santa Fé. Jean Baptiste Say was on a voyage from Buenos Aires, Argentina to Paraná.
Curonia	Russia	The barque was driven ashore on Saltholmen, Denmark. She was on a voyage from Vyborg, Grand Duchy of Finland to Marseille, Bouches-du-Rhône, France.
Dalmatia	United Kingdom	The steamship was wrecked before 16 September. She was on a voyage from Rangoon, Burma to Galle, Ceylon.
Deygden	Russia	The barque was driven ashore at "Nollen".
Ella	Norway	The brigantine was wrecked. Her crew were rescued.
Ellen Dawson	United Kingdom	The ship was driven ashore and wrecked at Braunton, Devon.
Ethel Horatio	United Kingdom	The steamship ran aground at the Trekroner Fort, Denmark. She was on a voyage from Riga, Russia to Dublin. She was refloated.
Expedit	Denmark	The steamship was driven ashore at Hainan Head, China. Her crew were rescued. She subsequently became a wreck.
Figaro	France	The barque was severely damaged at Haiphong, French Indo-China.
Flying Foam	United Kingdom	The tug was driven ashore on the north coast of Ailsa Craig.
Francesca	United Kingdom	The yacht was driven ashore in Wick Bay. Her crew survived; three were rescued by rocket apparatus.
Glenavon	United Kingdom	The steamship was driven ashore at Blyth, Northumberland. She was later refloated and resumed her voyage.
Gulf of Carpentaria	United Kingdom	The steamship struck a sunken rock and was lost.
Helen	United Kingdom	The ship was driven ashore in Bideford Bay. She was on a voyage from Kinsale, County Cork to Newport, Monmouthshire.
Heroine	United Kingdom	The ship was wrecked near Viana do Castelo. Her crew were rescued.
H. S. Walker	United Kingdom	The fishing dandy was run into by the steam trawler Green Castle (United Kingdom) and was severely damaged. She was towed in to Lowestoft, Suffolk.
Honest Miller	United Kingdom	The Thames barge sank at Southend Pier, Essex.
Ida	United Kingdom	The steamship struck a sunken rock off Liepāja, Russia and was holed.
Imbros	United Kingdom	The steamship ran aground at Savannah, Georgia, United States.
James M'Millan	United Kingdom	The fishing boat foundered off Birsay, Orkney Islands with the loss of all hands, seven or eight lives.
Juliet	United Kingdom	The steamship was driven ashore at Point Aconi, Nova Scotia.
Katy	United Kingdom	The ship ran aground off Öland, Sweden.
Marion	United Kingdom	The schooner was driven ashore and wrecked at Criccieth, Caernarfonshire. Her crew were rescued.
Melanope	United Kingdom	The ship was driven ashore in the Hooghly River. She was on a voyage from Calcutta to Falmouth, Cornwall. She was refloated and resumed her voyage.
Nepthis	United Kingdom	The steamship was run into by the steamship Redewater (United Kingdom) and was severely damaged. She was taken in to Jeddah, Hejaz Vilayet for temporary repairs.
Nithsdale	United Kingdom	The steamship was driven ashore at North Seaton Point, Cumberland. She was on a voyage from Maryport, Cumberland to Kronstadt, Russia. She was refloated on 2 September and taken in to Maryport, resuming her voyage the next day.
Oden	Sweden	The steamship collided with the steamship Knud (Denmark) and sank off Bornholm, Denmark. Her crew were rescued. Oden was on a voyage from Grimsby, Lincolnshire, United Kingdom to Gävle.
Orient	United States	The barge was wrecked in a hurricane at Galveston, Texas with the loss of five lives.
Princess Royal	United Kingdom	The ship was driven ashore and sank at Fleetwood, Lancashire.
Rapid	United Kingdom	The steamship was run into by the steamship Leverington (United Kingdom) at Cardiff, Glamorgan and was beached.
Richard Hayward	United Kingdom	The full-rigged ship was abandoned at sea on or before 29 December, having caught fire, or been set afire. She was on a voyage from Sunderland, County Durham to Singapore, Straits Settlements.
Sandsend	United Kingdom	The steamship was driven ashore on Häfringe Island, Sweden. She was refloated on 9 September and taken in to "Norkoplag".
San Prospero	Italy	The brig was destroyed by fire at Quartu Sant'Elena, Sardinia. Her crew were rescued. She was on a voyage from Leith, Lothian, United Kingdom to Genoa.
Sorane	Denmark	The brig was driven ashore on Terschelling, Friesland, Netherlands. She was on a voyage from Charleston, South Carolina, United States to Hamburg, Germany.
St. Pierre	France	The barque was wrecked in the "Sutphen Islands". All on board were rescued.
Sweepstakes	Canada	The schooner sank at Big Tub Harbour, Tobermory, Ontario sometime in September following damage sustained at Cove Island in August 1885.
Swiftsure	United Kingdom	The ship departed from Greenock, Renfrewshire for Banff, Aberdeenshire. No further trace, presumed foundered with the loss of all eleven crew.
Tacna	United Kingdom	The barque caught fire and was abandoned at sea. Thirteen of her crew were rescued on 11 September by Herschel (Flag unknown).
Tiber	United Kingdom	The steamship ran aground at "Sjallegrund", Sweden. She was on a voyage from Newcastle upon Tyne to Kronstadt. She was refloated with assistance from a steamship.
Ville de Malaga	France	The passenger ship capsized Cape Noli, Italy. She was on a voyage from Genoa to Marseille.
Wergeland	Norway	The barque ran aground on the Middle Bank, off the coast of County Donegal, United Kingdom. She was on a voyage from Arkhangelsk, Russia to Cardiff, Glamorgan, United Kingdom. She was refloated on 2 September.
Widgeon	United Kingdom	The steamship ran aground in the Old Vlie. She was on a voyage from London to Harlingen, Friesland, Netherlands.
York City	United Kingdom	The steamship ran aground. She was on a voyage from Saint John, New Brunswick to Halifax, Nova Scotia. She was refloated and subsequently placed under repair.
Galveston Lifeboat	United States Life-Saving Service	The lifeboat capsized whilst going to the assistance of the barge Orient in a hurricane. Her crew survived.
Unnamed	Flag unknown	The brigantine ran aground on the East Hoyle Bank, in Liverpool Bay.
Unnamed	United States	The schooner ran aground on the Oxey Spit, in the Solent.
Unnamed	France	The lugger was run into by the steamship Trevethick (United Kingdom) and sank in the North Sea off Whitby, Yorkshire, United Kingdom with some loss of life. Six survivors were rescued by Trevethick.
