= Old Mexico =

Old Mexico (Spanish: Viejo México) most commonly refers to the country of Mexico. The term may also refer to:

== Places ==
=== Modern designations ===
==== Mexico ====
- Valley of Mexico region, referred to in ancient times as Anahuac
  - Mexico City, in the State of Mexico
- Northern Mexico, including Baja California, Baja California Sur, Chihuahua, Coahuila, Durango, Nuevo León, Sinaloa, Sonora and Tamaulipas

==== United States ====
Parts of the United States formerly part of Mexico are sometimes referred to as Old Mexico

- California, formerly The Californias
- New Mexico, formerly Nuevo México, itself sometimes referred to as “Old New Mexico”
  - Pueblos, namesake of Nuevo México, their advanced trading network once connected with the Valley of Mexico, their network became part of El Camino Real
- Texas, formerly Spanish Texas and Coahuila y Tejas

=== Historical designations ===
- Tenochtitlan, the altepetl of the Mexica people
- Aztec Empire, an empire formed in 1428 that lasted until 1521

== In film ==
- In Old Mexico, 1938 American Western film
- Belle of Old Mexico, 1950 American film
- A Night in Old Mexico, 2013 Spanish-American film

== In music ==
- "The Seashores of Old Mexico", 1971 song written by Merle Haggard, recorded by Hank Snow
- Seashores of Old Mexico, 1987 studio album by Merle Haggard and Willie Nelson

== See also ==
- Mexico (disambiguation)
- New Mexico (disambiguation)
