= New Mexican =

New Mexican may refer to someone or something of, from, or related to the US State of New Mexico

- A person from New Mexico; see List of people from New Mexico
  - A historical person from the Spanish viceroyalty or Mexican territory of Nuevo México
  - A historical person from the US territory of New Mexico
- New Mexican cuisine, cuisine originating from New Mexico
  - New Mexican chile, group of peppers from New Mexico
- New Mexican music (disambiguation)
- New Mexican English, English dialects from New Mexico
- New Mexican Spanish, Spanish dialect from New Mexico
- The Santa Fe New Mexican, a newspaper published in Santa Fe, New Mexico

== See also ==
- New Mexico (disambiguation)
- Hispano, Pueblo, Navajo, Apache, or other ethnic groups from or related to New Mexico
