= Wreck of the Bristol =

1836 maritime disaster in the United States

The wreck of the Bristol on Far Rockaway Beach, near New York, United States, November 21, 1836, killed 60 to 70 people. Most of the deaths were due to huge waves that broke down the ship and drowned passengers sheltering in the hold. The captain, Alexander McKown, behaved admirably, did everything he could to save the surviving souls, and was the last person to leave the wreckage.

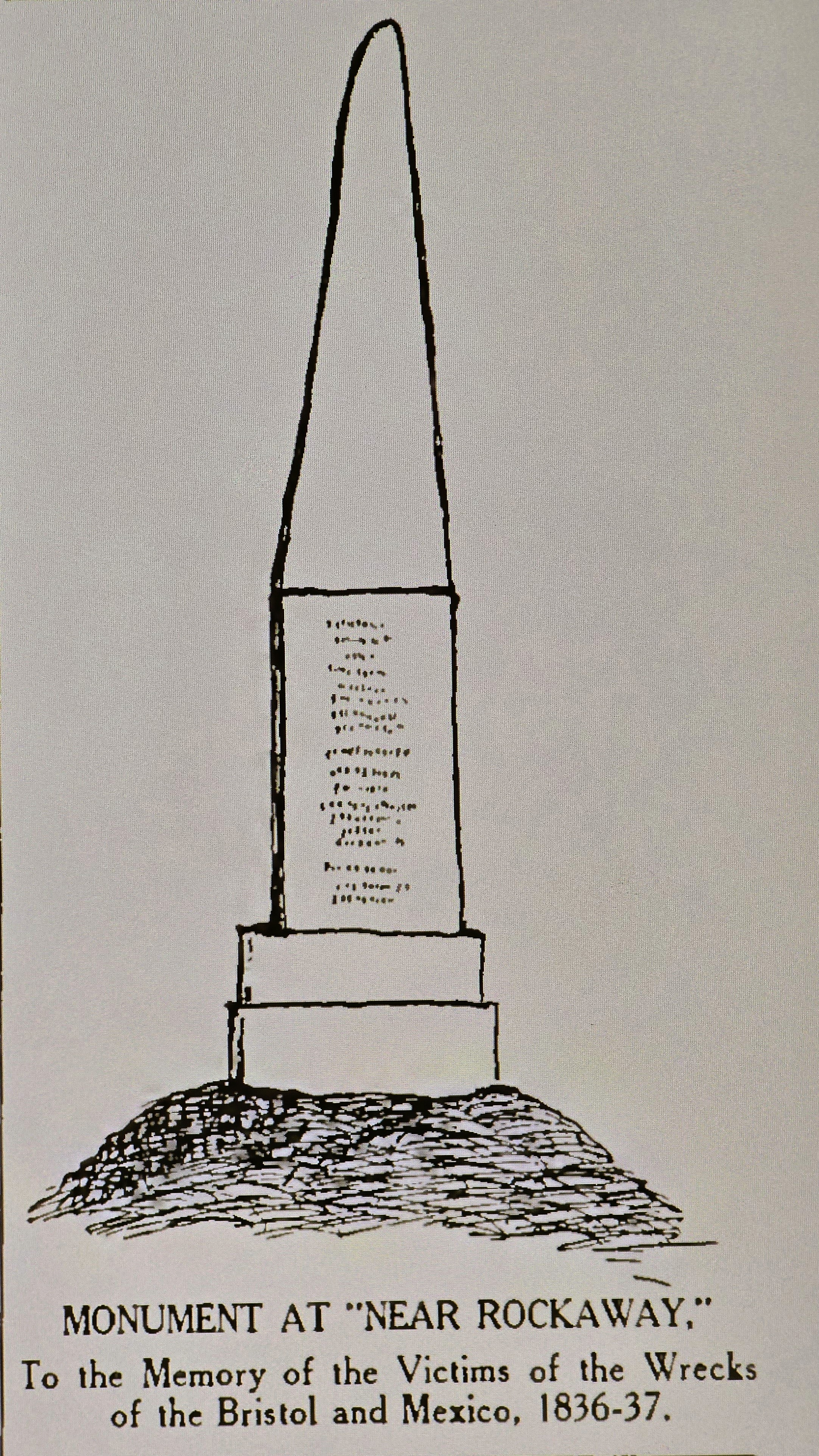
Monument erected in Near Rockaway memorializing the wrecks of the Bristol and Mexico

An obelisk marking the mass grave of the casualties of the wrecks of the Bristol and the Mexico (January 1837), stands in Rockville Cemetery, formerly Old Sand Hill Cemetery, in Rockville, Long Island.
