= Mexico City (disambiguation) =

Mexico City is the capital and most populous city of Mexico.

Mexico City may also refer to:

- Mexico City (film), a 2000 Canadian film
- Greater Mexico City, a metropolitan area that contains Mexico City and adjacent municipalities
- Mexico City (former administrative division), a former subdivision of the then-Federal District
- Mexico City International Airport
- 1968 Summer Olympics

== See also ==
- Boroughs of Mexico City
- List of cities in Mexico
- Battle of Mexico City (disambiguation)
- Mexico (disambiguation)
