= Battle of Mexico City (disambiguation) =

The Battle of Mexico City may refer to:

== Warfare ==
- Fall of Tenochtitlan (1521) the conquest of the Aztec City preceding the Spanish renaming
- Battle of Mexico City (1823)
- Battle for Mexico City (1847)
- Capture of Mexico City (1863)
- Siege of Mexico City (1867)

== Other uses ==
- The Battle of Mexico City (2001 video album) concert film for 1999 concert in Mexico City by Rage Against the Machine

== See also ==
- Timeline of Mexico City
- Mexico City (disambiguation)
