= Rockville Cemetery =

Historic cemetery in New York, United States

- Rockville Cemetery and Bristol and Mexico Monument
- U.S. National Register of Historic Places
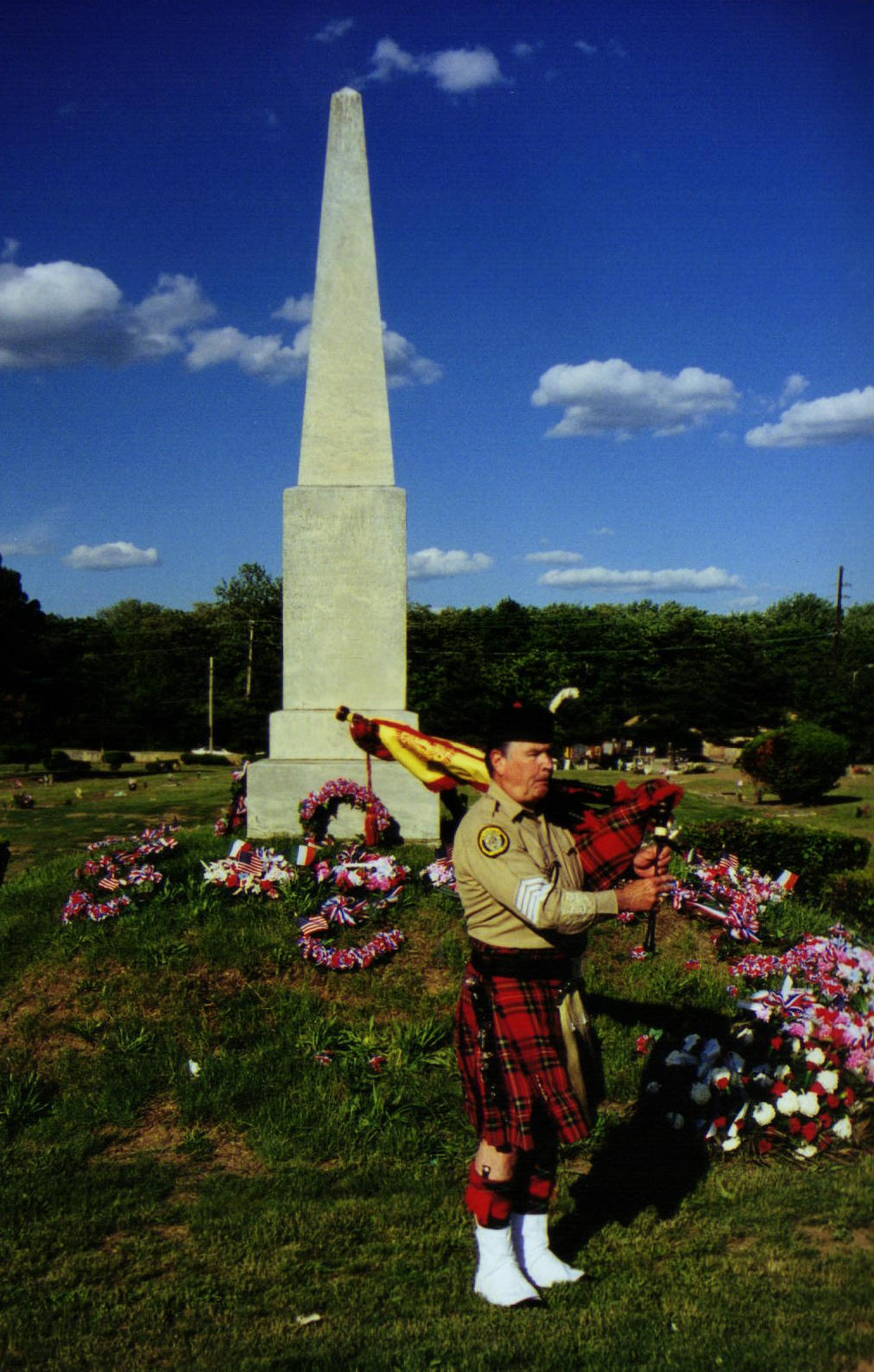

- Location within New York Location within the United States
- Location: 45 Merrick Road; Lynbrook, New York
- Coordinates: 40°39′31″N 73°39′41″W
- Area: 13.23 acres (5.35 ha)
- Built: 1799
- NRHP reference No.: 15000801
- Added to NRHP: November 16, 2015

Rockville Cemetery and Bristol and Mexico Monument is a historic cemetery located at Lynbrook in Nassau County, New York. The cemetery started as a small local burial ground in 1799. It subsequently came to be the final resting place of many early Near Rockaway settlers. The cemetery features a monument to two nearby shipwrecks, the Bristol and the Mexico, in the winter of 1836–1837. The Bristol and Mexico Monument marks the mass grave of the 139 passengers, mostly Irish immigrants fleeing famine. The shipwrecks resulted in changes to New York Harbor approach practices.

In 1953, a 20-year-old Ruth Bader wrote an article in New York Folklore Quarterly about the memorial. She described the poor condition of the memorial at the time, and the very negative opinion of the memorial from Nathaniel Prime, author of History of Long Island, which was published five years after the memorial was completed. She also included a brief history of the ships' voyages from Liverpool in October 1836, and their losses off of Long Island in late November 1836 and early January 1837.

The monument was listed on the National Register of Historic Places in 2015.

Two notable persons are buried in Rockville. They are blues musician Reverend Gary Davis (1896–1972) and B&B/doo-wop musician James "Shep" Sheppard of Shep and the Limelites (1935–1970).
