= USS Naiad =

Gunboat of the United States Navy

Coordinates: 39.1332°N 94.0735°W

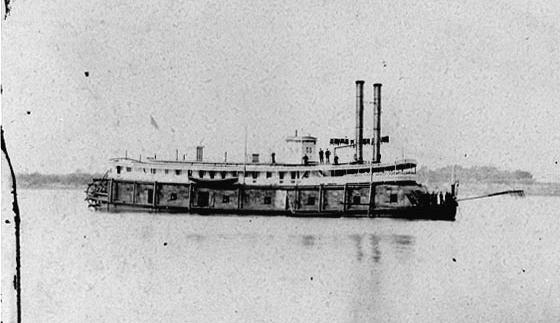
- Naiad on the Western Rivers during the American Civil War, reproduced as a stereograph. Note mine-clearing "rake" projecting from her bow

History

United States
- Name: Princess (1863–64, 1865–68); USS Naiad (1864–65)
- Namesake: naiad
- Launched: 1863
- Acquired: bought 3 March 1864
- Commissioned: 3 April 1864
- Decommissioned: 30 June 1865
- Fate: Sold 17 August 1865; Sank 1 June 1868

General characteristics
- Type: gunboat
- Displacement: 183 long tons (186 t)
- Length: 156 ft 10 in (47.80 m)
- Beam: 30 ft 4 in (9.25 m)
- Draft: 6 ft (1.8 m)
- Depth: 4 ft 5 in (1.35 m)
- Propulsion: stern wheel paddle steamer
- Speed: 5 knots (9.3 km/h; 5.8 mph)
- Armament: 8 × 24-pounder guns

USS Naiad was a sternwheel paddle steamer of the Union Navy in the American Civil War. In Greek mythology, naiads are nymphs who lived in and gave life to lakes, rivers, springs, and fountains.

Built as Princess in 1863 at Freedom, Pennsylvania, the ship was purchased by the Navy from F. Martin at Cincinnati, Ohio, on 3 March 1864; and commissioned on 3 April 1864, Acting Master Harry T. Keene in command.

== Service history ==
Acquired to bolster Union strength along the Mississippi River and its tributaries against Confederate cavalry and guerrilla raids, Naiad served in the shallow waters through the end of the American Civil War, from time to time fighting Southern shore batteries. On 15 and 16 June 1864, with USS General Bragg and USS Winnebago, she dueled Southern artillery at Ratliff's Landing, Louisiana, silencing the riverbank guns on both occasions. Again on 2 September, she snuffed out the fire of a Confederate battery near Rowe's Landing, Louisiana. The constant patrol of the rivers by Naiad and her sister "tinclads" helped the Union to maintain open communications and supply lines in the West while preventing the South from mustering her resources to oppose Generals Sherman and Grant.

Naiad decommissioned at Cairo, Illinois, on 30 June 1865 and was sold at auction at Mound City, Illinois to B. F. Beansly, on 17 August 1865. Renamed Princess in post-war civilian service, she struck a snag and sank at Napoleon, Missouri, on 1 June 1868.

== See also ==
- Anaconda Plan
- Mississippi Squadron
