= Mexique =

Mexique may refer to:

- Mexico, a country, a republic in North America
- State of Mexico, Mexico; a federal state of the republic of Mexico, the Mexiquense state
- Mexique Bay, an alternate name of the Gulf of Mexico near Mexico
- SS Mexique, French trans-Atlantic ocean liner
- Jonathan Mexique (born 1995), French soccer player
- Mexique (restaurant), Chicago, Illinois, USA; a former restaurant that once held a Michelin Star

== See also ==
- Mexico (disambiguation)
