= New Mexico (disambiguation) =

New Mexico is a state in the southwestern United States, the term also refers to the historical Nuevo México in New Spain and Mexico, as well as the former New Mexico Territory and the U.S. provisional government of New Mexico which preceded it in the American frontier.

New Mexico may also refer to:

== Places ==
=== Mexico ===
- Nuevo México, Chiapas; see Villaflores, Chiapas
- Nuevo México, Jalisco

=== United States ===
- Mexico, Illinois, formerly New Mexico, Illinois
- New Mexico, Maryland, an unincorporated community in Carroll County

=== Elsewhere ===
- New Mexico, New South Wales, Australia
- Nuevo México, Chiriquí, Panama

== Ships ==
- USS New Mexico, several ships of the US Navy
  - New Mexico (BB-40), the lead ship of the New Mexico-class battleships
    - New Mexico-class battleships
  - New Mexico (SSN-779), a Virginia-class submarine under construction

== Other ==
- New Mexico (film), a 1951 American film directed by Irving Reis
- New Mexico chile, a cultivar group
- New Mexico music, a music genre
- University of New Mexico, a public university in Albuquerque
  - New Mexico Lobos, the athletic program of the above institution
- New Mexico State University, a public university in Las Cruces, New Mexico
  - New Mexico State Aggies, the athletic program of the above institution

== See also ==
- Old Mexico (disambiguation)
- New Mexican (disambiguation)
- Mexico (disambiguation)
- State of Mexico, also known as Old Mexico (Spanish: Viejo México)
