= New Mexican music =

New Mexican music is music related to the U.S. state of New Mexico, and the term may refer to:

- Music of New Mexico, any type of music, from various genres, created in or about New Mexico
- New Mexico music, a genre of traditional folk music that originated in New Mexico
