= Moxico =

Moxico may refer to:

- Moxico Province, Angola
- Moxico (municipality), a municipality within the province
