= México, México (album) =

Compilation album by Various Artists
- Released: May 16, 2006
- Recorded: Various times
- Genre: Latin pop; Cumbia; Reggaeton
- Label: EMI

México, México is a compilation album recorded for Mexico's soccer team that competed in the 2006 FIFA World Cup in Germany. The album was released on May 16, 2006 and contains the official song of the Mexican soccer team "México, México" by RBD.

== Track listing ==
| # | Title | Artist(s) |
|---|---|---|---|
| 01. | "México, México" | RBD | 3:25 |
| 02. | "La Mano de Dios (Marado)" | Rodrigo | 5:45 |
| 03. | "Siquitibum" [Versión Cumbia] | Chick - Pack | 3:20 |
| 04. | "No Tengo Dinero" | Kumbia Kings, Juan Gabriel, El Gran Silencio | 4:55 |
| 05. | "Hasta Que Te Conocí" | Pilar Montenegro, Julio Voltio | 3:10 |
| 06. | "Nalguita" | Plastilina Mosh | 4:14 |
| 07. | "Para Mi Barrio" | Vico C, Tony Touch, D'Mingo | 5:51 |
| 08. | "Brinca" | DJ Kane | 3:13 |
| 09. | "Dormir Soñando" | El Gran Silencio | 3:07 |
| 10. | "No Se Olvidar" | Sello Duranguense | 3:05 |
| 11. | "Cielito Lindo" | Mónica, Raúl, Ruth, Cipriano | 2:32 |
