= J. M. White =

Cotton packet

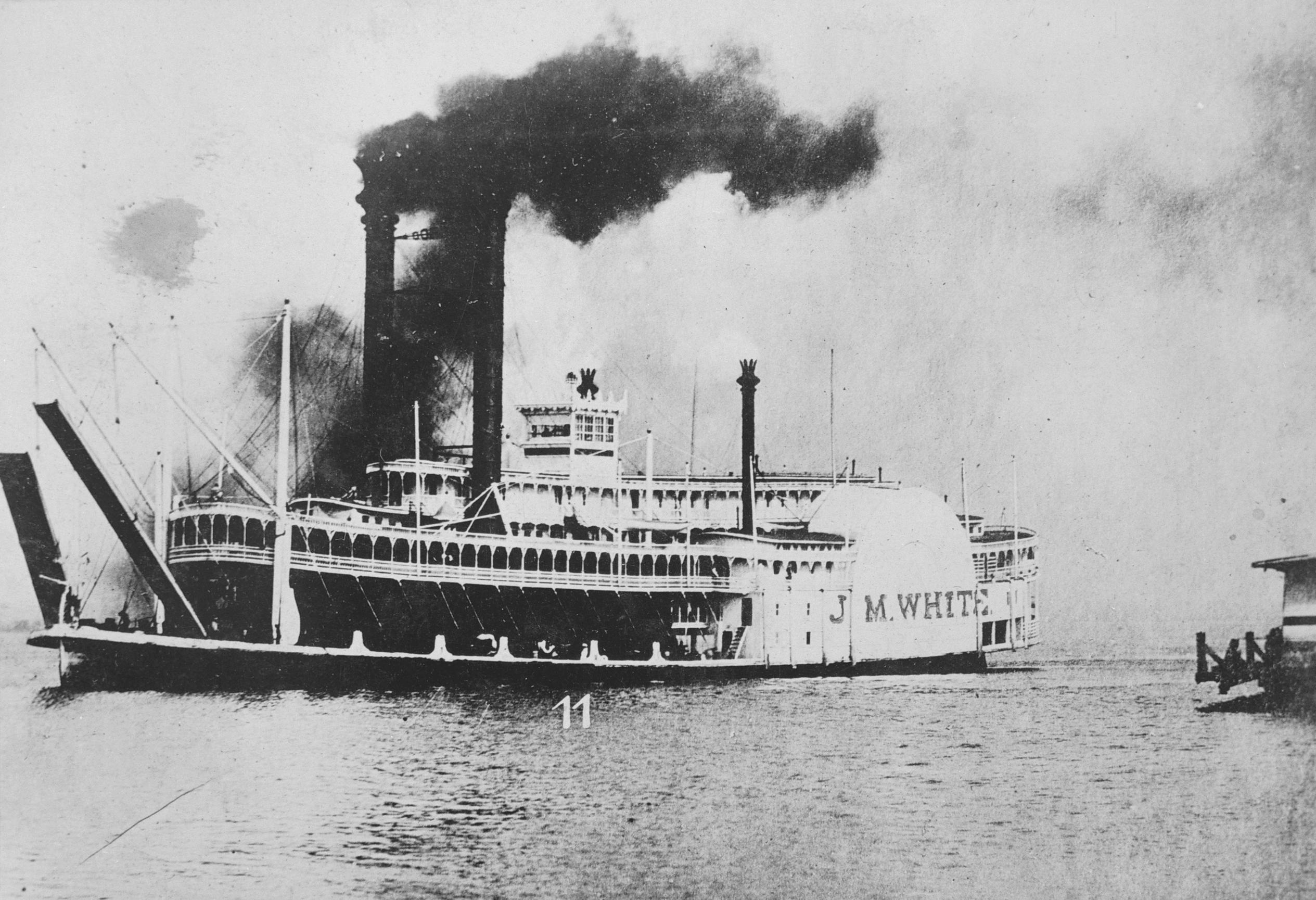

History
- Name: J. M. White
- Namesake: Captain J. M. White of Kentucky
- Owner: John W. Tobin
- Operator: Greenville and New Orleans Packet Company
- Port of registry: New Orleans, Louisiana United States
- Route: New Orleans, Louisiana, to Vicksburg, Mississippi, to Greenville, Mississippi
- Builder: Howard Ship Yard, Jeffersonville, Indiana
- Cost: $220,000
- Launched: April 3, 1873
- In service: 1878
- Out of service: December 13, 1886
- Fate: Caught fire and sank at Blue Store Landing in Pointe Coupee Parish, Louisiana
- Notes: Earned the nickname "Mistress of the Mississippi"

General characteristics
- Length: 375 feet (114 m)
- Beam: 91 feet (28 m) (across paddle boxes)
- Propulsion: 2 side-mounted paddle wheels
- Capacity: 350 passengers and 10,000 cotton bales (maximum)

J. M. White was a sidewheel riverboat, built for the Greenville and New Orleans Packet Company. She caught fire and sank on December 13, 1886, at Blue Store Landing in Pointe Coupee Parish, Louisiana, causing 28 deaths.

== Construction ==
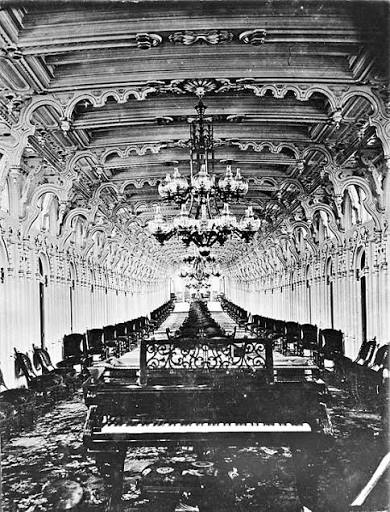
Saloon aboard the J. M. White

J. M. White was built for Captain John W. Tobin of the Greenville and New Orleans Packet Company and cost $220,000 to build. She was the 276th steamboat built at Howard Ship Yard in Jeffersonville, Indiana, and the fourth built for Captain Tobin. She was named after the riverboat captain J. M. White of Cloverport, Kentucky. Timber from across the eastern United States was used in her construction: oak from West Virginia, pine from Pennsylvania, and cylinder timbers and wheel house chocks from Indiana. She was designed as a cotton packet where she could carry 10,000 bales of cotton. The J. M. White was launched on April 3, 1873. She had an overall length of 375 ft (114 m) and a beam of 91 ft (28 m). The ship's saloon was designed by architect Thomas Bell which was built in a "Steamboat Gothic" style between August 1877 and June 1878. Her steam was produced using 10 boilers which fed her engines producing 2,400 hp with 43-inch cylinders and an 11-foot stroke.

== Career ==
J. M. White's maiden voyage took place in 1878 where she would be captained by Captain Tobin and on her southern route towed the incomplete steamer Edward J. Gay. Due to economic instability, yellow fever, and a growing railroad industry, she failed to turn a profit, however, over the course of her career she gained a reputation for her reliability, luxury, and power which earned her the nickname "Mistress of the Mississippi".

Over the course of her career, she mainly operated on the route from New Orleans, Louisiana, to Vicksburg, Mississippi, alongside the Robert E. Lee II and the Natchez. Due to many on-going issues in the South, J. M. White's most loaded voyage only carried 5,067 bales of cotton, around half of her maximum cotton capacity. By the first week of December 1886, J. M. White was worth $60,000 with an insurance coverage of $27,000. This would drop to only $2,700, causing her owners to fall into great economic strain where she was charted to other owners just to turn a profit.

== Disaster ==
On December 13, 1886, during a trip from Vicksburg, Mississippi, to New Orleans, Louisiana, she was docked at Blue Store Point in Pointe Coupee Parish, Louisiana, carrying: 3,600 bales of cotton, 8,000 bags of seed, 800 barrels of oil, gunpowder, and some 40 passengers. Shortly after tying to the dock, the gunpowder in her hold ignited causing flames and timbers to shoot out from under the main deck. Some sources say that a passenger on board was smoking a cigarette and ash caused a drape to engulf in flames, but the exact cause is leaned more towards the gunpowder. She was burned to the waterline and along with her took the lives of 28 passengers and crew as well as a 3,980-pound ox named Otoe Chief. Otoe Chief was regarded as one of the largest in the world and was on tour around the Southern United States and was being transported to New Orleans, Louisiana, for Mardi Gras. The clerk, a man named Walsh Floyd, was named a hero for saving lives while losing his own.

== Legacy ==
Today, her grand piano, multiple chairs, silverware, and other items were recovered afterwards and placed into museums and private collections. During low tide, J. M. White's wreck is still visible, covered with silt.
