= México, México (song) =

2006 song by RBD for the FIFA World Cup

Single by RBD

from the album México, México
- Language: Spanish
- Released: 16 May 2006
- Genre: Latin pop
- Length: 3:24
- Label: EMI
- Songwriter: Armando Ávila
- Producers: Armando Ávila; Pedro Damián

RBD singles chronology
"Este corazón" (2006)	"México, México" (2006)	"No pares" (2006)

"México, México" is the official song recorded by Mexican pop-rock group RBD for the Mexico national football team that competed in the 2006 FIFA World Cup that took place in Germany. The track is sung only by Anahí, Dulce María, and Maite Perroni, with lyrics about cheering on the team and having faith in them. The song was released alongside a music video, which features the band playing the sport at a beach.

== Background and release ==
The Mexico national football team competed in the 2006 FIFA World Cup that was held in Germany from 9 June to 9 July. A compilation album of the same name, containing tracks by several artists, was commissioned by the label EMI; the record included songs by artists such as Juan Gabriel and Kumbia Kings.

RBD was chosen to perform the official song for the team, and "México, México" was released on 16 May 2006 as the first and only single from the album. The song was also featured as the fourth and last theme song for the third season of the telenovela Rebelde, which starred the members of RBD. This intro featured the girls performing the track in a party alongside their castmates inside a school set from the show, with scenes of the video interspersed.

== Music video ==
An official music video for the song was filmed in Mexico. It features the band playing soccer with other people in a beach and on a boat. Clips of the Mexican football are also shown throughout. The girls appear singing their verses in front of a marine blue wall, with shots of the previous scenes being proyected onto their faces and stomachs.

== Credits and personnel ==
- Alfonso Herrera – vocals
- Anahí – vocals
- Armando Antonio de la Fluente Ávila – songwriter, producer IPI name identifyer 00438832435
- Christian Chávez – vocals
- Christopher von Uckermann – vocals
- Dulce María – vocals
- Maite Perroni – vocals
- Pedro Damián – producer
