= Paraná, Rio Grande do Norte =

Municipality in Rio Grande do Norte, Brazil

Coordinates: 6°29′09″S 38°18′46″W

- Municipality
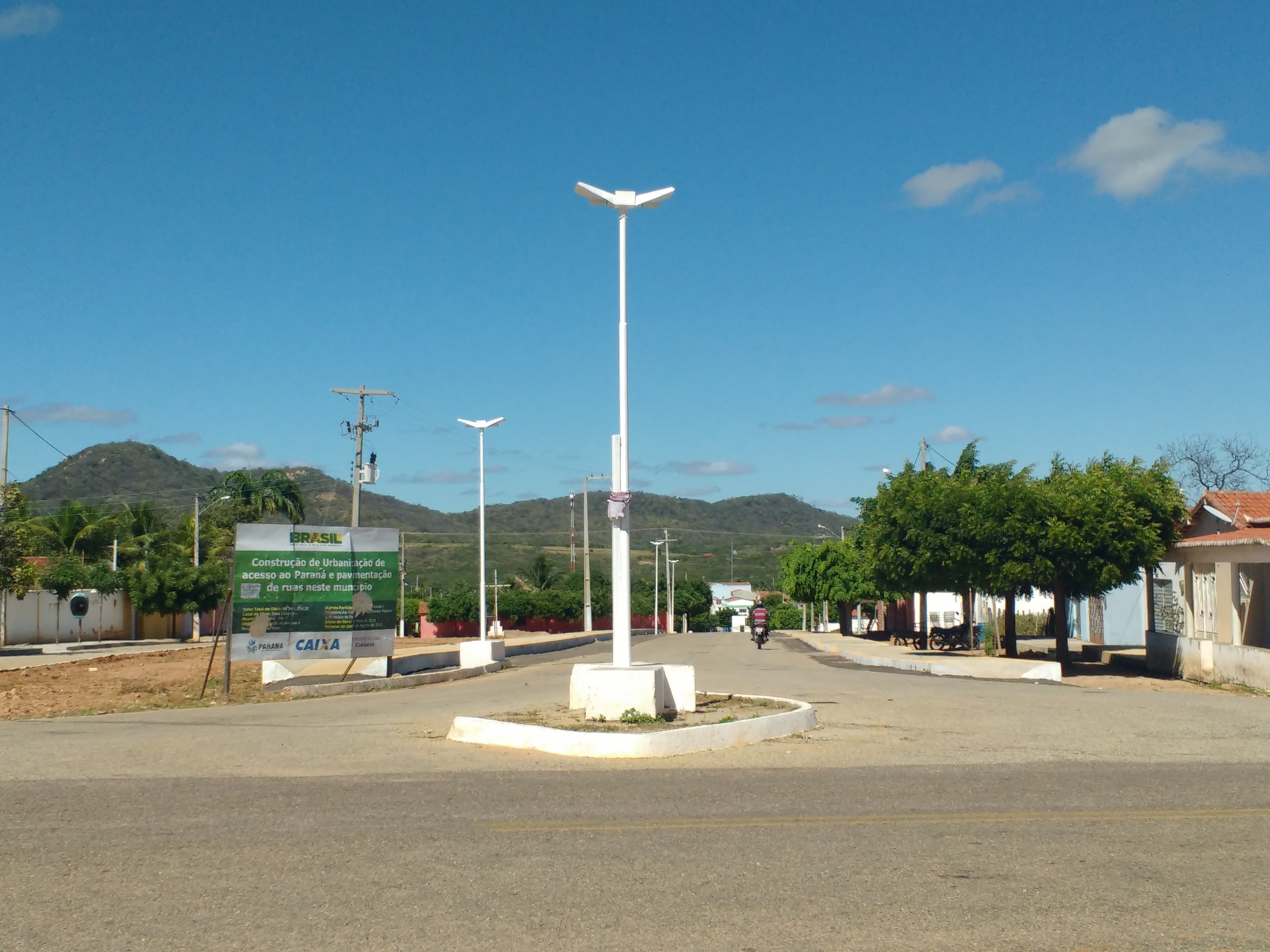

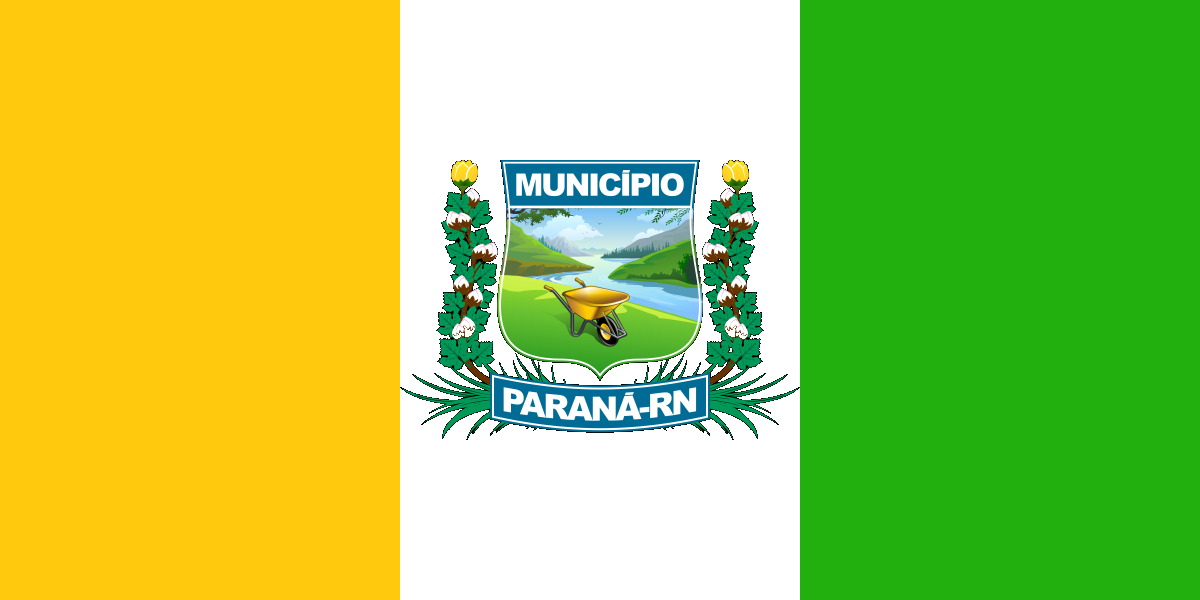
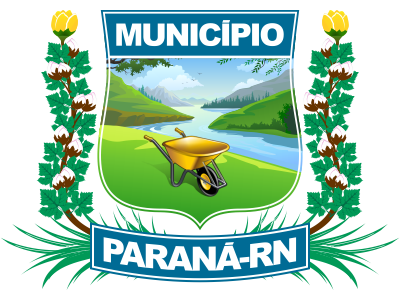
- Flag Coat of arms
- Interactive map of Paraná, Rio Grande do Norte
- Country: Brazil
- Region: Nordeste
- State: Rio Grande do Norte
- Mesoregion: Oeste Potiguar

Population (2020)
  - Total: 4,276
- Time zone: UTC−3 (BRT)

Paraná is a municipality in the state of Rio Grande do Norte in the Northeast region of Brazil.

== See also ==
- List of municipalities in Rio Grande do Norte
