= USS General Bragg =

Gunboat of the United States Navy

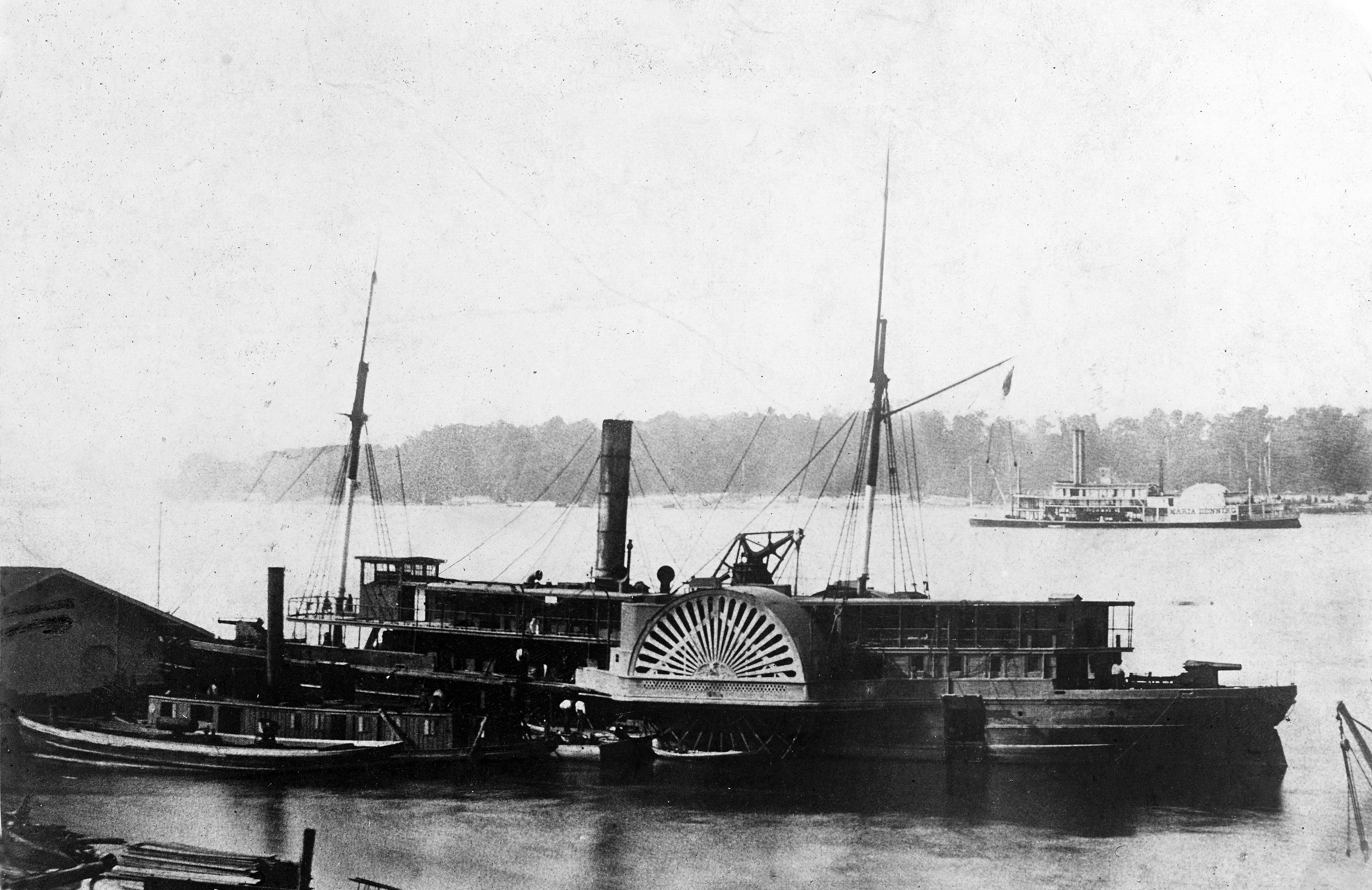
- USS General Bragg probably photographed at Cairo or Mound City, Illinois, circa 1862-63.

History

United States
- Namesake: General Braxton Bragg
- Launched: 1851
- Acquired: 30 September 1862
- Commissioned: circa 9 July 1862
- Decommissioned: 24 July 1865
- Fate: Sold, 1 September 1865

General characteristics
- Displacement: 1,043 tons
- Length: 208 ft (63 m)
- Beam: 32 ft 8 in (9.96 m)
- Draft: 12 ft (3.7 m)
- Depth of hold: 15 ft (4.6 m)
- Propulsion: Steam engine, side-wheel propelled
- Speed: 10 knots (12 mph; 19 km/h)
- Armament: 1 × 30-pounder gun; 1 × 32-pounder gun; 1 × 12-pounder gun

USS General Bragg was a heavy (1,043-ton) steamer captured by Union Navy forces during the American Civil War. She was outfitted as a U.S. Navy gunboat and was assigned to enforce the Union blockade of the waterways of the Confederate States of America.

== Service history ==
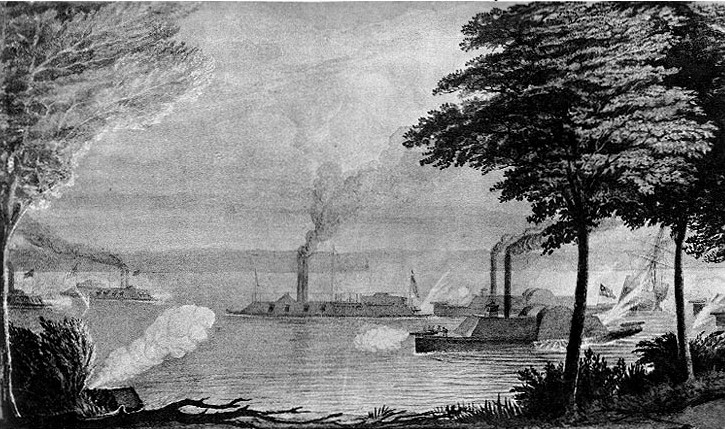
CSS General Bragg participating in the battle of Fort Pillow

General Bragg was originally the 1043-ton side-wheel river steamer Mexico and was built in New York City in 1851. She was owned by the Southern Steamship Co. at the start of the American Civil War. Mexico was pressed into Confederate service as CSS General Bragg at New Orleans, Louisiana 15 January 1862. She was converted to a "cottonclad" ram and renamed for General Braxton Bragg, a western theater commander. As part of the River Defense Fleet, she took part in the defenses of Memphis, Tennessee, and the surrounding area. In an action off Fort Pillow on 10 May 1862 she helped sink the Union Navy ironclad Cincinnati (later raised and refitted) and was put out of action herself. On 6 June, she was run aground and captured during the naval battle off Memphis. After repairs, she became USS General Bragg.

Following General Bragg's capture by the Union's Western Flotilla, she was transferred to the War Department 30 September 1862. Her first commanding officer was Lieutenant Joshua Bishop. General Bragg was fitted out at Cairo, Illinois, departing 9 July 1862 for Helena, Arkansas. She sailed 16 August 1862 as part of an escort to steamer Iatan carrying 500 troops to the mouth of the Yazoo River for reconnaissance of Confederate batteries and guerrilla parties. For the next 15 months, except for periods of repair at Memphis, she patrolled the river from Helena to the mouth of the Yazoo River, where she guarded against Confederate movements toward Vicksburg, Mississippi.

With the fall of Vicksburg in July 1863, General Bragg remained in the vicinity until her departure 13 December, for her new station at the mouth of the Red River. During the spring of 1864, it was her duty to guard the mouth of the river in support of the joint expedition against Shreveport, Louisiana on the Red. She began patrolling the river again, and 15 June engaged a Confederate battery with Naiad near Tunica Bend, Louisiana. Per the later captured battle flag of Barlow's Battery, now preserved at the Illinois National Guard Museum, thirty-two rounds were fired at the General Bragg. For a time the ships got the worst of the action amid a hail of shot and musketry, but eventually drove off the Confederates with the help of Winnebago. General Bragg was disabled in the action.

The remainder of General Bragg's career was spent patrolling the Mississippi from the mouth of the Red River to Natchez, Mississippi. Infrequently she cruised as far south as Baton Rouge, Louisiana and New Orleans, Louisiana. The ship returned to Mound City, Illinois, 2 July 1865, and decommissioned at Cairo 24 July 1865. She was sold 1 September 1865, she was redocumented Mexico. She was employed for U.S. civilian purposes until 1870, when she was sold to foreign interests.
