= Wreck of the Mexico (1837) =

1837 maritime disaster in the United States

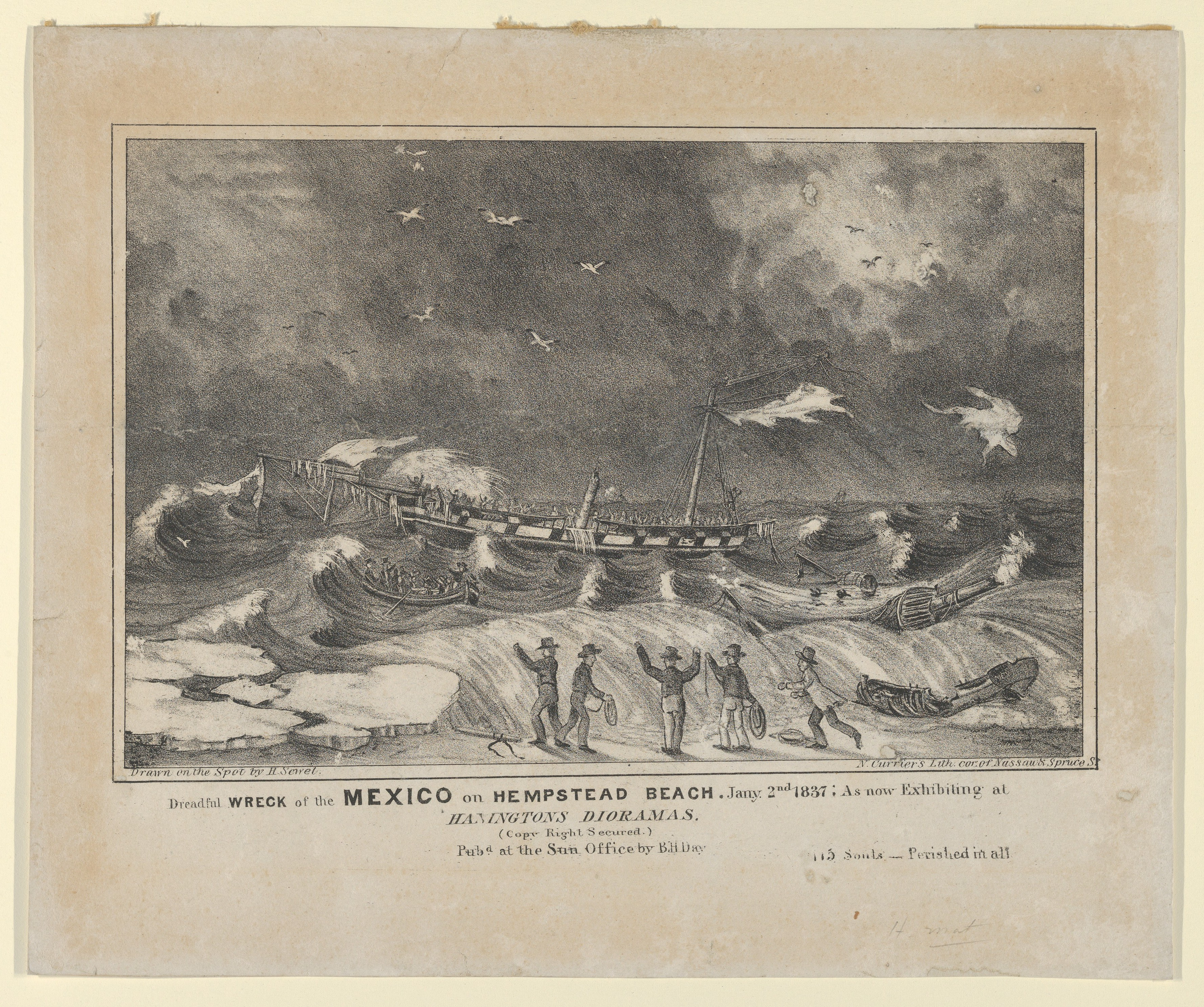
Dreadful Wreck of the Mexico on Hempstead Beach (Nathaniel Currier lithograph, Metropolitan Museum of Art 63.550.95)

The wreck of the Mexico killed 115 people off the coast of Long Island, New York, United States, on January 2, 1837. The Mexico, a ship laden with Irish immigrants, had attempted an entrance into New York Harbor, but a nor'easter forced it back out to sea; it ran aground on a sandbar 200 yards off the coast of Long Beach. The 115 casualties froze to death on the deck of the ship, surrounded by waves "as high as a house”. Daniel Melancthon Tredwell recalled "seeing the drowned and the frozen being brought from the beach in sleds and being placed in rows in John Lott's barn for the identification of the friends and relatives." Eight were saved by the heroic effort of Raynor Smith and companions.

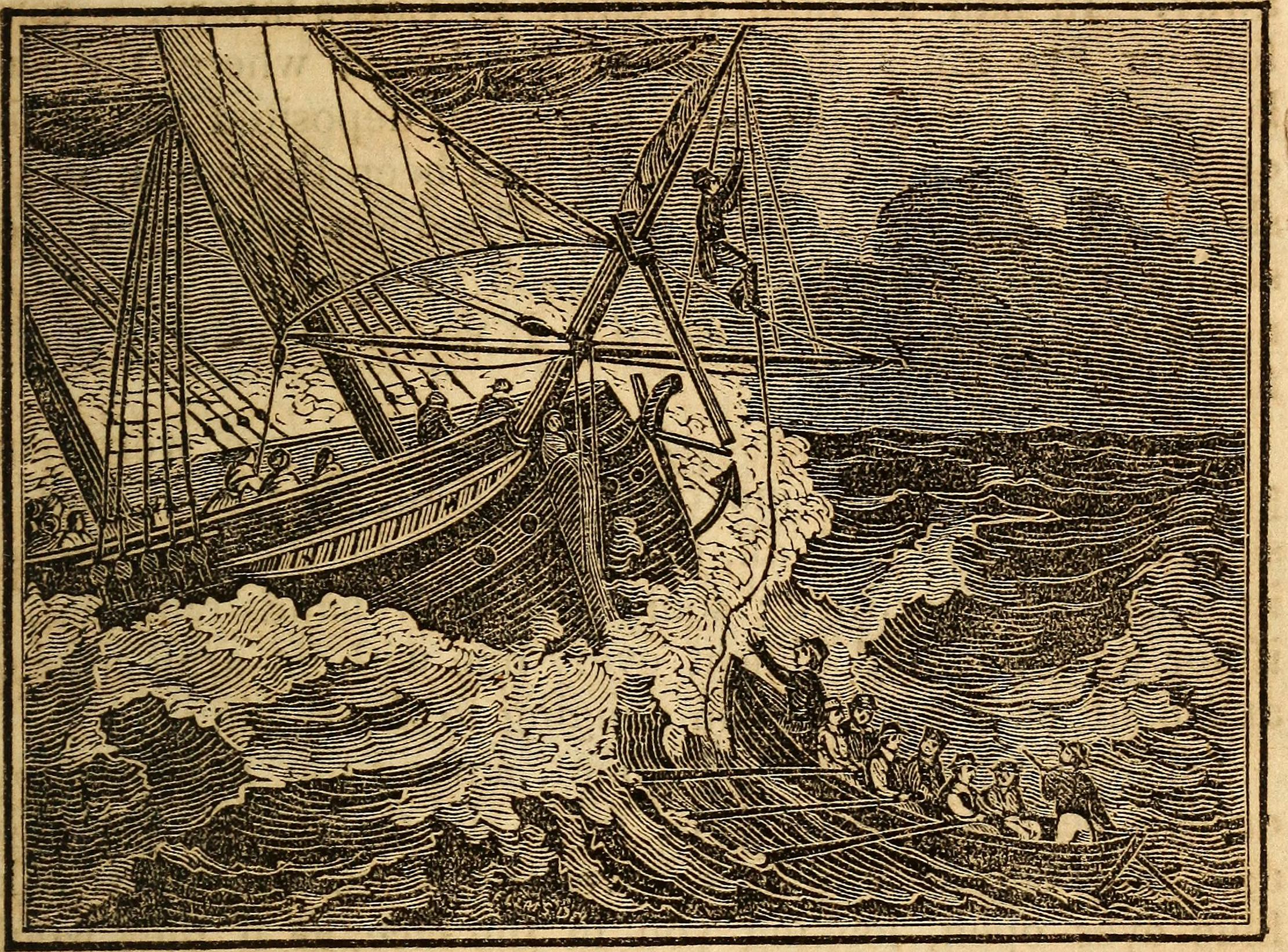
Rescue of Captain Winslow

The captain, Charles Winslow, saved himself, his sword and the ship's lockbox by jumping in Smith's boat and leaving the passengers behind to die.

The Mexico was a ship sailing from Liverpool. She was classed as a barque and carried "300 tons burden."

Her cargo consisting of crockery, railroad iron, and coals, which had been taken in alongside the Bristol's. She sailed, however, seven days later, leaving Liverpool, Oct. 23, 1836, with a crew of 12 men, including the captain, and 112 steerage passengers, the greater portion of whom were Irish emigrants. After a most disagreeable and boisterous passage of 69 days, at the most inclement season of the year, the vessel arrived off Sandy Hook, on Saturday night, Dec. 31, about 11 o'clock, and lay to, on discovering the light upon the Highlands of New Jersey. On the morning of the following day, she bore up for the Hook, making the usual signals of distress, and also for a pilot. None, however, made their appearance, and the captain being apprehensive of rough weather, stood out to sea, under the most discouraging and distressing circumstances. The voyage had thus far been unusually long and tedious; the passengers had generally exhausted their stores of provision, and had for some time been allowed, one biscuit a day each, from the ship, a quantity barely sufficient to sustain life. To which were added all the direful apprehensions of still more protracted suffering, from the want of a pilot, and the danger of attempting at that season of the year, to enter the harbor without one. The weather was cold in the extreme, attended by a violent tempest of snow. On Monday, the captain again approached the Hook, and also signalled for a pilot, in which he was equally unsuccessful...On Tuesday morning, 5 o'clock, after the most terrible buffeting with the waves, the crew and passengers being nearly perished with the cold, the vessel having drifted toward shore, struck the beach at Hempstead south, within about ten miles of the wreck of the Bristol. The thermometer was now below zero, and there was a high surf breaking on the shore. The main and mizen masts were immediately cut away; the rudder was torn off, by collision with the bottom; the water was rising in the hold, and the spray, which dashed incessantly over the vessel, was instantly converted into ice. The wretched and despairing passengers, driven from below by the accumulation of water, and without any means whatever of shelter or protection from the cold, crowded together upon the forward deck, exposed every moment either to be washed over board or frozen to death, as every thing around them was encrusted in ice. Some secured their money and other valuables about their bodies, and each clung with death-like tenacity to those they held most dear. In this extremity of despair, when scarce a ray of hope remained, men, women and children, from the sire to the lisping infant, embraced each other, and with what feeble power remained, tried in vain to encourage and support each other. In this horrible condition they remained, till secured by death from further agony; and husbands, wives and children were afterwards found congealed together in one frozen mass. It was, in all respects, a scene of terror which language is incapable of depicting, and which the most fertile imagination only can conceive.

— B.F. Thompson, The history of Long Island, from its discovery to the present time (1843): "Loss of the Mexico," pages 270–274

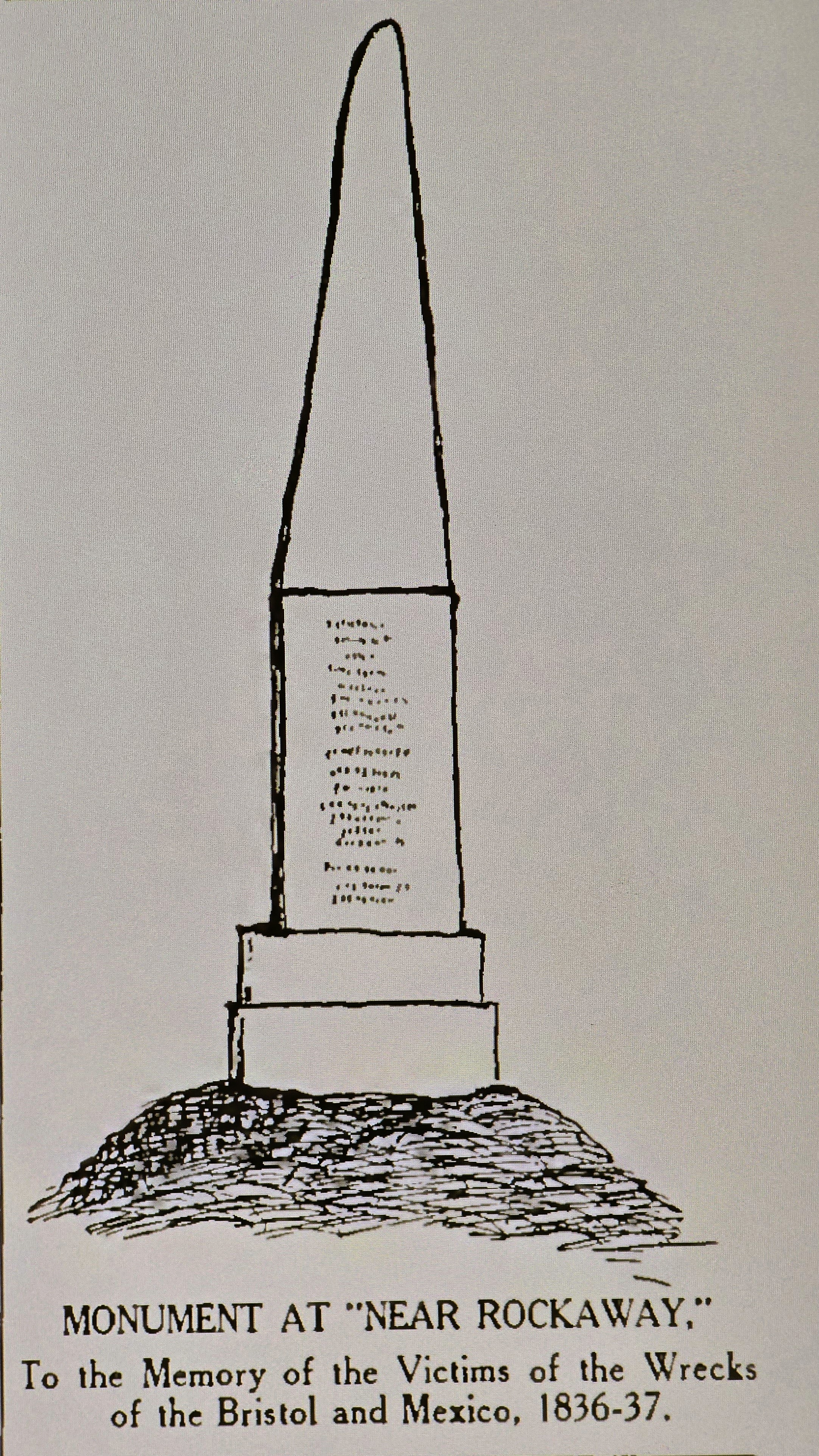
Monument erected in Near Rockaway memorializing the wrecks of the Bristol and Mexico

Two months prior to the wreck of the Mexico, "The Bristol, inbound from Liverpool to New York, broke up in a gale on Far Rockaway beach on the night of November 21, 1836, with a loss of 77 lives."

The wreck of the Mexico and the failed search for survivors is subject of the Walt Whitman poem "The Sleepers" in Leaves of Grass. In 1953, Ruth Bader (later Ginsburg) published an article about the wrecks of the Bristol and Mexico. An obelisk marking the mass grave of the casualties of the wrecks of the Bristol and the Mexico stands in Rockville Cemetery, formerly Old Sand Hill Cemetery, in Rockville, Long Island. In 2018, a historical marker was placed near the site of the tragedy.
