= Kelly Key discography =

- Studio albums: 9
- Compilation albums: 2
- Singles: 22
- Music videos: 19
- Promotional singles: 4

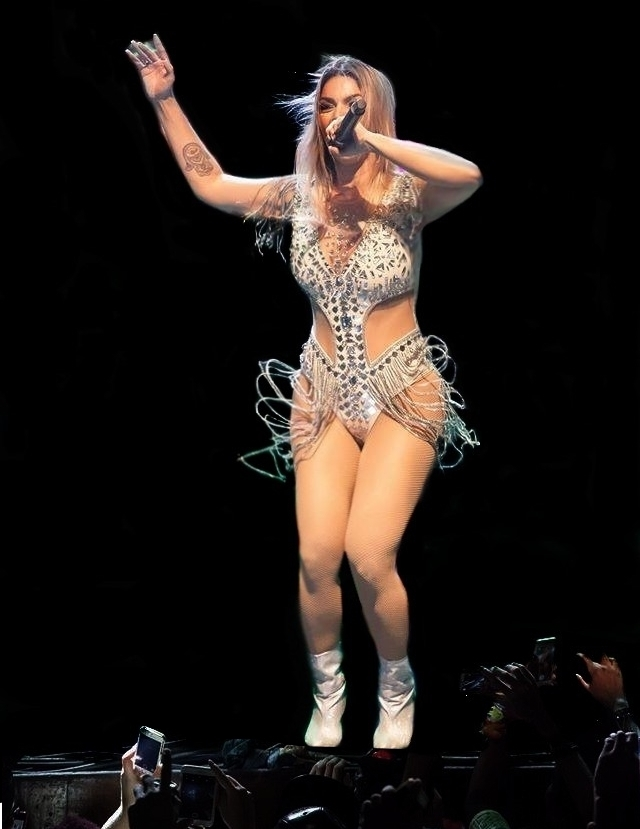
Kelly Key at a show in 2016

The discography of Brazilian pop singer-songwriter Kelly Key consists of six studio album, two compilations, one live album and twenty-two singles. Key is one of the best-selling music pop artists of all-time in Brazil, with sales of over two million albums.

== Albums ==
=== Studio albums ===
Title	Album details	Peak chart positions		Certifications
Title	Album details	BRA	POR	Certifications
Kelly Key	Released: December 22, 2001; Formats: CD, digital download; Label: Warner Music	1	35	BRA: 3× Platinum; POR: Gold
Do Meu Jeito	Released: April 10, 2003; Formats: CD, digital download; Label: Warner Music	1	—	BRA: 2× Platinum
Kelly Key	Released: May 23, 2005; Formats: CD, digital download; Label: Warner Music	2	—	BRA: Gold
Por Que Não?	Released: June 20, 2006; Formats: CD, digital download; Label: Warner Music	8	—	
Pra Brilhar	Released: December 10, 2008; Formats: CD, digital download; Label: Som Livre	11	—	
No Controle	Released: March 2, 2015; Formats: CD, digital download; Label: Deckdisc	5	—	
Do Jeito Delas	Released: July 10, 2020; Formats: CD, digital download; Label: Warner	18	—	

=== Live albums ===
Title	Album details	Peak	Certifications
Title	Album details	BRA	Certifications
Kelly Key – Ao Vivo	Released: January 20, 2004; Formats: CD, digital download; Label: Warner Music	1	BRA: Gold

=== Compilation albums ===
Title	Album details	Peak	Certifications
Title	Album details	BRA	Certifications
Remix Hits	Release: August 18, 2002; Formats: CD, digital download; Label: Warner Music	4	BRA: Gold
100%	Release: December 10, 2007; Formats: CD, digital download; Label: Som Livre	14	

=== Spanish albums ===
Title	Details
En Español	Released: May 14, 2002; Formats: CD, digital download; Label: Warner Music

== Singles ==
List of singles, showing year released and album name
Title	Year	Album
"Escondido"	2001	Kelly Key
"Baba"	2001	Kelly Key
"Anjo"	2002	Kelly Key
"Cachorrinho"	2002	Kelly Key
"Adoleta"	2003	Do Meu Jeito
"Chic, Chic"	2003	Do Meu Jeito
"A Loirinha, o Playboy e o Negão"	2003	Do Meu Jeito
"Por Causa de Você"	2004	Kelly Key – Ao Vivo
"Escuta Aqui Rapaz"	2005	Kelly Key
"Sou a Barbie Girl"	2005	Kelly Key
"Papinho"	2005	Kelly Key
"Pegue e Puxe"	2006	Por Que Não?
"Shake Boom" (featuring Joe Joe)	2006	Por Que Não?
"Analista"	2007	Por Que Não?
"Você é o Cara"	2007	100%
"Super Poderosa"	2008	100%
"O Tempo Vai Passar"	2008	Pra Brilhar
"Indecisão (Mr. Jam Remix)"	2009	Pra Brilhar
"O Problema é Meu" (featuring Mr. Jam)	2011	
"Controle"	2014	No Controle
"Turn Around"	2015	No Controle
"Let It Glow"	2015	No Controle

=== As featured artist ===
Title	Year	Album
"Band Vida" (with Artists for Life)	2004	Charity single
"Tan Feliz" (Pee Wee featuring Kelly Key)	2011	Déjate Querer

=== Other songs ===
Title	Year	Album
"Só Quero Ficar"	2002	Kelly Key
"Baba"	2002	En Español
"Ángel"	2002	En Español
"Cachorrito"	2002	En Español
"Quién Eres Tú?"	2002	En Español
"Ciúme" (featuring Daddy Kall)	2003	Do Meu Jeito
"Tô Fora"	2008	Kelly Key
"K Diferente"	2010	Studio K

== DVD ==
Title	Album details	Peak	Certifications
Title	Album details	BRA	Certifications
Kelly Key – Ao Vivo	Released: January 20, 2004; Formats: DVD; Label: Warner Music	1	BRA: Gold
Toda Linda	Release: July 10, 2006; Formats: DVD; Label: Warner Music	10	
