= Por que Não? =

Por Que Não?

Studio album by Kelly Key
- Released: September 20, 2006
- Recorded: 2006
- Genre: Pop; R&B
- Length: 38:17
- Language: Portuguese
- Label: Warner Music
- Producer: Plínio Profeta; Humberto Tavares; DJ Mãozinha

Kelly Key chronology
Kelly Key (2005)	Por Que Não? (2006)	100% Kelly Key (2007)

Singles from Kelly Key
- 1. "Pegue e Puxe" Released: September 15, 2006; 2. "Shake Boom" Released: December 23, 2006; 3. "Analista" Released: April 4, 2007

Por que Não? (en: Why Not?) is the fourth studio album by Brazilian pop singer Kelly Key, released on September 20, 2006, by Warner Music.

== Track listing ==
Standard version
No.	Title	Writer(s)	Length
1.	"Pegue e Puxe"	Andinho	2:36
2.	"Shake Boom" (feat. Joe Joe)	Andinho, Gustavo Lins	3:40
3.	"Toda Linda"	Andinho	4:20
4.	"Analista"	Andinho	3:21
5.	"Por que Não?"	Kelly Key, Gustavo Lins	3:27
6.	"Olhão"	Andinho	3:43
7.	"Numa Boa"	Gustavo Lins	3:40
8.	"Me Pega de Jeito"	Álvaro Socci	2:50
9.	"Demorô"	Gustavo Lins, Humberto Tavares	3:48
10.	"Chamada a Cobrar"	Andinho	4:11
11.	"Conquistador"	Humberto Tavares, Edu Ferreira	3:38
12.	"Uma Pessoa Especial"	Gustavo Lins, Humberto Tavares	3:38
