= Samba, Pagode & Cia. =

- Genre: Variety show; musical
- Directed by: Roberto Talma
- Starring: Netinho de Paula; Salgadinho; Kelly Key
- Country of origin: Brazil
- Original language: Portuguese

Original release
- Network: TV Globo
- Release: 27 March – 15 May 1999

Samba, Pagode & Cia. was a Brazilian television program produced by TV Globo and was broadcast between 27 March and 15 May 1999. The program was presented by singers Salgadinho, Netinho de Paula, and Kelly Key. The format of the show later served as the inspiration for the program Esquenta!.

== Production ==
The program was brainstormed and directed by Roberto Talma, after evaluating the good reception of formats said to be "popular" such as Brasil Legal, along with the height in popularity that pagode had in Brazil at that time, where it was the most played genre on radio and various bands arising and becoming established. Netinho de Paula, the lead vocalist from Negritude Jr., was invited to be one of the presenters after the production team positively received his experience presenting Amigos e Sucesso on RecordTV. They later would also invite Salgadinho, the lead singer of Katinguelê. Kelly Key, at that time known artistically as Kelly Ka, was originally just one of the models contracted to record the program's opening, but the director saw her as a charismatic person and, starting on the second episode, she began to present the show also at 16 years old.

== History ==
The program made its debut on 27 March 1999 with a scene that resembles a boteco, bringing tables and chairs where the presenters received the artists that were invited. The artists would sing and be interviewed while there is a counter where a bartender prepared drinks and beer for the artists, with an audience in the background. The setting simulated the surroundings of the peripheral areas of a city, with wood houses and electric cables. The first epsidoe also alternated between the audience and scenes of a show recorded at Via Funchal with the groups of the respective presenters. This was especially the case for the debut episode.

On 3 April, with the entrance of Kelly Key in the second episode, the program began to be filmed in the boteco location, now without an audience, where Netinho and Salgadinho continued to receive various samba and pagode artists, and a large house, where Kelly interviewed singers from other genres as well. To make it so that the directors felt that the show had the adequate "image of the periphery", Kelly, who is a blonde white woman, needed to dye her hair black and braid in dreadlocks, along with tanning her skin to have a darker skin tone. Another change was Talma being replaced as director by Eid Walesko and Aloysio Legey.

The program's last episode was aired on 15 May 1999. Netinho commented in an interview for TV Press that the broadcaster did not listen to the advice of singers and was not able to consolidate a program for a lower income audience, and tried to instead make it for the elite and bet on an unreal portrayal of the periphery. He mentioned that in fact the public just wanted a more popular program with an audience that did not render any identification with: "Globo is led by elitists and without any identification with the people. What is popular, for the directors of Globo, is the tacky thing in the world. To make pagode while drinking champagne really did not work".

== Audience ==
The program was not well received by audiences, leaving the broadcaster, which had most of its programming in first place among competitors, in second place at its debut, behind RecordTV's Programa Raul Gil at that same time. This occurred over the course of the program's lifetime, and never led ratings at any point during its broadcast.
