= Deivid (disambiguation) =

Deivid (born 1979), born Deivid de Souza, is a Brazilian football manager and former footballer

Deivid may also refer to:

- Deivid (born 1988), born Deivid Rodrigo Soares De Macedo, Brazilian football forward
- Deivid (born 1989), born David Omar Rodríguez Barrera, Spanish football defender
- Deivid Willian da Silva (born 1989), born Deivid Willian da Silva, Brazilian football defensive midfielder

== See also ==
- David (name)
