= Salgadinho =

Salgadinho most commonly refers to small savoury snacks in Brazilian cuisine.

Salgadinho may also refer to:

- Salgadinho, Pernambuco
- Salgadinho, Paraíba
- Salgadinho (singer), Brazilian samba and pagode singer, musician, and composer
