= Netinho de Paula =

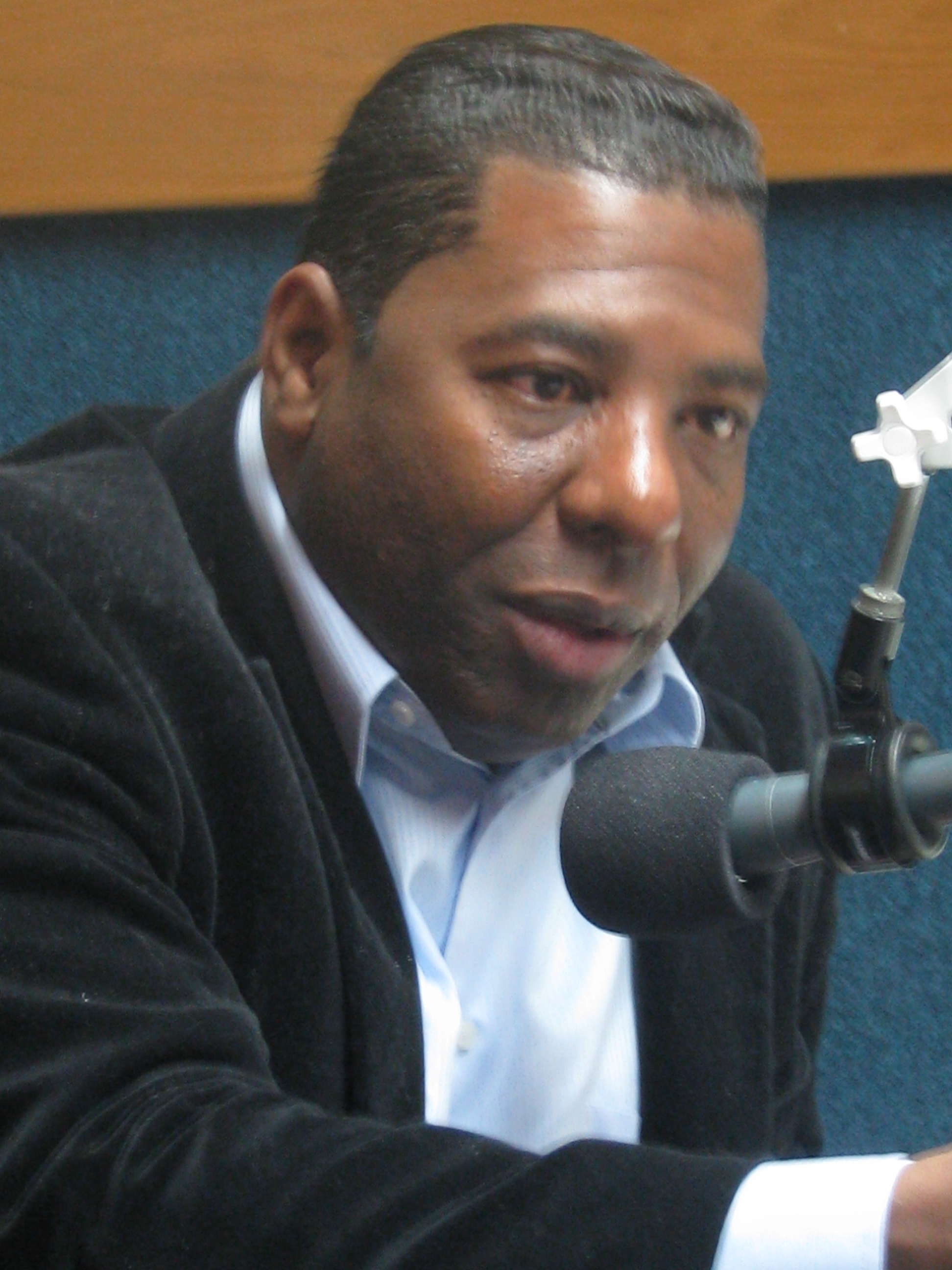
- Netinho de Paula in 2010
- Born: José de Paula Neto; 11 July 1970 (age 56); São Paulo, Brazil
- Occupations: Musician, TV presenter, politician
- Years active: 1986–present
- Musical career
- Genre: Pagode
- Instruments: Vocals
- Formerly of: Negritude Júnior

José de Paula Neto (born 11 July 1970), better known by his artistic name Netinho de Paula, is a Brazilian presenter, singer, composer, actor, and politician. During the course of his musical career, he grew in popularity starting in the 1990s for his work as a vocalist with the group Negritude Júnior. He would later become famous for his hosting of various TV shows from the 1990s onward. In 2008, Netinho was elected as councilman to the city council of the city of São Paulo for the Communist Party of Brazil (PCdoB), with 84,406 votes, or 1.41%. He was the third most voted candidate in the elections that year. He is currently affiliated with Podemos (PODE).

== Early life ==
Netinho was born in the Santo Amaro neighborhood of São Paulo and was raised in the suburb of Carapicuíba. He lived for a long time in an apartment in Cohab 2 in the eastern zone of São Paulo.

== Career ==
=== Music ===
In 1986, he began his musical career with the pagode group Negritude Júnior. As a vocalist with the group, they lived in a joint home where he had lived, releasing, at that time, music to great success and national recognition in 1990s. Among their hits were "Cohab City" and "Tanajura". The song “Beijo Geladinho” was featured on the soundtrack of the telenovela A Dona do Pedaço. Netinho left the group in 2001 and began his solo career, where he began working as a TV presenter.

In 2014, Netinho de Paula, Lino, Waguininho and Fabinho came together and formed the group Negritudeando. However, due to a lawsuit made by the current members of Negritude Júnior, whom alleged that the name of the new group would harm the sales of their group, the name was changed to Família Cohab City. In 2019, he released the album Netinho de Paula canta 30 anos de Negritude Jr. He has also been a member of the musical project Amigos do Pagode 90 since 2014, together with other famous names in the pagode scene during the 90s, such as Salgadinho, Márcio Art, and Chrigor.

=== Television ===
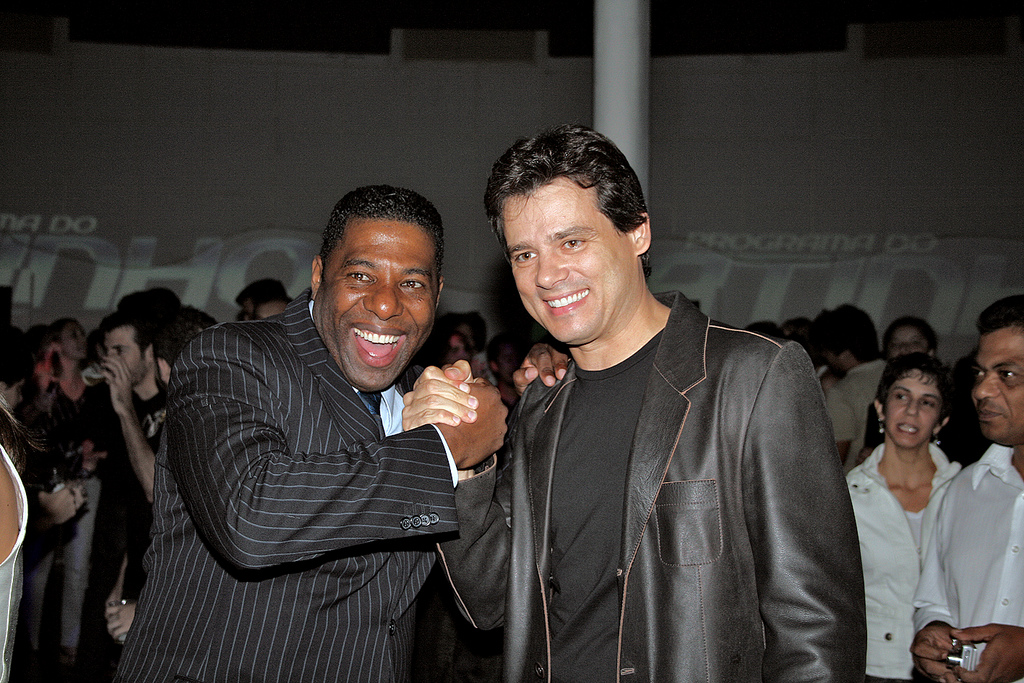
Netinho de Paula and Celso Portiolli in 2009.

In 1998, while still a member of Negritude Júnior, he presented Planeta Xuxa as Xuxa left on maternal leave. The following year, he presented, along with Salgadinho and Kelly Key (at that time going as Kelly Ka) the program Samba, Pagode & Cia. on Rede Globo, which stayed on the air for only two months.

In the television programs that he hosted, he was depicted as a person that cares about people living in the peripheral areas of major cities. Due to larger trends of systemic racism, they are disproportionally poorer and Black, and as such, are often the targets of discrimination and often lack opportunities to progress socioeconomically in life. His efforts to combat these trends were shown on the program Domingo da Gente, on the "Dia de Princesa" segment. In these segments, he raises the self-esteem of girls who live in these areas with affirming attitudes and deeds, such as a beauty treatment, donating money, professional development courses, and so on. The program was broadcast on Rede Record from 2001 to 2006.

In November 2005, Netinho founded the station TV da Gente, in partnership with Angolan and Brazilian businesspeople. It is based in the city of Pacajus, Ceará state. The station is the first television station in Brazil oriented towards a Black audience. The objective was to show the ethnic diversity of Brazilians, giving more space to Black people on TV. It was originally broadcast on channel 19 UHF and 42 UHF digital, on the channels of the Eduardo Sá Educational Foundation. The program is broadcast in the states of São Paulo, Ceará, and Bahia.

On 23 March 2009, he signed a contract with SBT, where he hosted, from May 2009 onward, a 3-hour long program on Saturday evenings, with Marlene Mattos as director, the Show da Gente program, which was broadcast until March 2010. The show substituted the Saturday edition of Cinema em Casa.

On 25 February 2012, Netinho began to host Programa da Gente on RedeTV!, which was an independent production he recorded in his own production studios. The program would include the "Banco dos Sonhos" segment, a newer version of the "Um Dia de Princesa" segment, which reported on many people’s exciting life stories.

On 1 July 2018, he signed a contract with Band to begin hosting the program Brasil da Gente, after its former host José Luiz Datena had left to run for the Brazilian senate. The program played the "Caixa de Talentos" contest with various big names in Brazilian music, while also promising to revive the "Um Dia de Princesa" segment, which was Netinho's most famous work on television. With just two episodes aired, the program was cut short as Datena ended his senatorial run and began a new show, Agora É com Datena.

In 2019, he confirmed a new partnership that was made with RedeTV! to host Programa É da Gente on Sundays. The partnership lasted until December 2020, when Netinho left RedeTV! due to the sale of the company. Two days after he had left, Netinho signed with RBTV. In 2021, due to the sale of RBTV to Rede Mundial, the program began to be broadcast on TV WA.

== Political career ==
Netinho de Paula
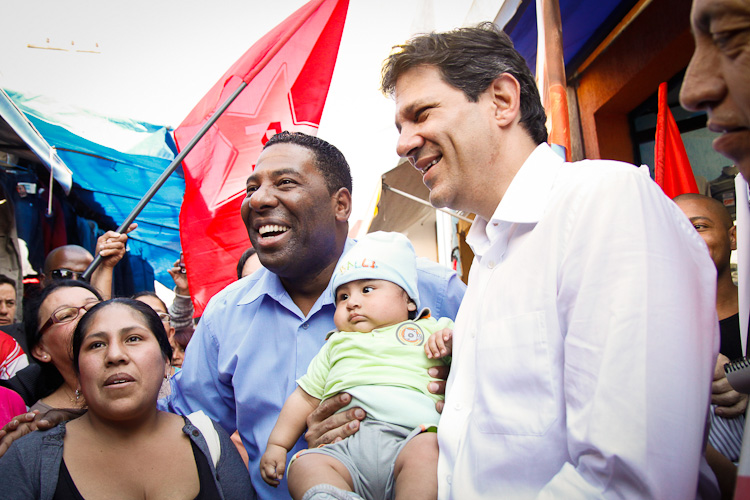
- Netinho de Paula and Fernando Haddad in 2012.

Councilman for São Paulo
- In office 1 January 2009 – 17 November 2015

Personal details
- Born: José de Paula Neto; 11 July 1970 (age 56) São Paulo, Brazil
- Party: Republicanos (2005–2007); PCdoB (2007–2015); PDT (2015–2018); PHS (2018–2019); PODE (2019–present)
- Occupation: Musician, TV presenter, politician

In 2008, Netinho was elected as a city councilor for the city of São Paulo for the PCdoB. In 2012, he was reelected. At the end of 2009, the PcDoB announced that he would be their candidate for the 2010 senatorial election. During the election, Netinho lost by a small margin for the second senatorial spot to Marta Suplicy, one of the favorites to win. With the death of Romeu Tuma at the end of the campaign, and an older assault case, allegedly against his ex-wife, coming to light, Netinho finished in third place. In 2011, the São Paulo branch of the PCdoB declared they would continue to support Netinho in his run to be the mayor of São Paulo. In December 2011, Netinho was polling at second place for the mayoralty according to Ibope, finishing only behind José Serra. Netinho kept planning for his candidacy until 25 June 2012, when he ended his campaign and the PCdoB decided afterwards to support Fernando Haddad. After being elected, Haddad named Netinho as Secretary for the Promotion of Racial Equality. He was substituted by Orlando Silva.

In July 2013, after the judgement of desembargador José Carlos Garcia, Netinho's assets were frozen. Garcia then requested an injunction from district attorney Marcelo Daneluzzi, who accused him of obtaining reimbursements from the Municipal Chamber showing receipts of ghost businesses. In February 2014, the state Court of Justice accepted the parquet's appeal and kept open the case. In January 2015, Netinho announced he had left the PCdoB for the Democratic Labour Party (PDT). According to him, the change in affiliation occurred due to a "lack of space" in the PCdoB and for the new party to assume the presidency of the municipal chamber. In November 2015, Netinho had his mandate as city councillor revoked for party infidelity. The judges of the regional election court determined that the substitute on Netinho's campaign must be sworn in ten days after the publication of the Court's judicial journal. In February 2018, with the election of Andrés Sanchez as president of Corinthians Paulista and his resignation as federal deputy, Netinho would have been eligible to become a deputy as his substitute, but ultimately, this position went to Luiz Cláudio Marcolino.

=== Electoral history ===
Electoral history of Netinho de Paula
Year	Position	Votes	Results	Ref.
2008	Councilor of São Paulo	84,406	Won	
2010	Senator for São Paulo	7,773,327	Lost	
2012	Councilor of São Paulo	50,698	Won	

== Personal life ==
Netinho is currently married to Jaqueline Aranha. He has 7 children, with 8 grandchildren as of 2021. He had previously been in a relationship with Taís Araújo.

=== Controversies ===
In 2022, a court in São Paulo had 162,900 reais seized from Netinho for having pressured a woman who appeared on Domingo da Gente to be her sister's kidney donor in 2001.

=== Accusations of assault ===
In February 2005, Netinho was accused of assaulting his wife at the time, Sandra Mendes de Figueiredo, after a dispute. Afterwards, he was ordered by a judge to return to their house soon after the judge learned that the house did not belong to Figueiredo, who later accepted an agreement that required that the reasoning behind the assault would not be disclosed.

On 20 November 2005, during the award ceremony for the Troféu Raça Negra in São Paulo, Netinho punched comedian Rodrigo Scarpa, from Pânico na TV, after he asked a question with a double meaning. Netinho was forced to pay R$44,670.00 in damages.

== Filmography ==
Television
Year	Title	Role	Notes	Broadcaster
1999	Samba, Pagode & Cia.	Presenter		Rede Globo
2001–06	Domingo da Gente	Presenter		RecordTV
2002–04	Turma do Gueto	Ricardo	Seasons 1–2	RecordTV
2009–10	Show da Gente	Presenter		SBT
2012	Programa da Gente	Presenter		Rede TV!
2018	Brasil da Gente	Presenter		Rede Bandeirantes
2019–present	É da Gente	Presenter		Rede TV! RBTV; TV WA

Film
Year	Title	Role
2005	Eliana em o Segredo dos Golfinhos	Roberto Romano

== Discography ==
- Coração Aberto (2002)
- Sou Eu (2002)
- Paixão Ardente: o Melhor de Netinho (2003)
- Netinho De Paula Ao Vivo (2004)
- O Melhor de Netinho de Paula: ao Vivo (2005)
- In Concert: ao Vivo (2006)
- Juntos e Mosturados (2008)
- Netinho e Cohab City (2016)
- Netinho Canta 30 Anos de Negritude (2017)
- Netinho Ao vivo - Assim mesmo (2023)
