= Quédate (Pee Wee song) =

Single by Pee Wee

from the album Yo Soy
- Released: December 24, 2009
- Recorded: 2008
- Genre: Latin pop
- Length: 3:17 (album version); 3:46 (remix)
- Label: EMI
- Songwriters: Claudia Brant; Irvin Salinas; Rudy Maya
- Producer: Rudy Maya

Pee Wee singles chronology
"Cumbayá" (2009)	"Quédate" (2009)	"Un Beso" (2010)

"Quédate" (English: "Stay") is a song from Pee Wee's debut studio album Yo Soy. It was released as the second promo single from the album and debuted live at El Show De Los Sueños in November 2008. It was eventually chosen as the album's official third single, released on December 24, 2009. A remix featuring Sardi was released on January 19, 2010.

== Track listing ==
- Digital download – The Remix
1. "Quédate (The Remix)" (featuring Sardi) – 3:46

== Charts ==
Chart (2009/2010)	Peak position
U.S. Billboard Hot Latin Songs	49
U.S. Billboard Latin Pop Songs	29
