= Band Kids =

Brazilian children's television show

Band Kids is a children's morning television program broadcast by the Brazilian channel Rede Bandeirantes since August 14, 2000.

The program was very well known and popular in the early years, having been one of the great influential in Anime fandom in Brazil, after the channel "Rede Manchete" went bankrupt a year before the program debuted. During the first years it was responsible for the debut of anime as Dragon Ball Z, Bucky, El-Hazard, Tenchi Muyo!, and continued the broadcast of Saint Seiya. The program ended prematurely after Rede Globo bought the rights to broadcast Dragon Ball Z, and in the following years it had sporadic returns. In 2009 the program returned to active with cartoons, teen dramas and teen sitcoms from American children's channels (most of the Nickelodeon), such as Futurama, Drake & Josh, Kenan & Kel, iCarly, The Simpsons and Teenage Mutant Ninja Turtles (2012). Band Kids ended definitely in 2014, with the decline of most of the children's morning programs in Brazil. However it returned in 2020 with new cartoons and anime.

For some years the program has also been known to inspire and compete with several other children's programs "clones" as TV Kids (RedeTV!) and Record Kids (Rede Record) and beating other popular children's programs such as TV Globinho and Bom Dia & Companhia. The program has already had several presenters including the actress Renata Saiyuri (well-known for presenting in the early years of the program), the singer Kelly Key, Giovanna Grigio, and some others. In the last years however the program has become a cartoon block without presentation.

The first generation of the program (with anime) developed a considerable legacy over the years with old fans.
