= Salgadinho (singer) =

- Born: Paulo Alexandre Nogueira Salgado Martins; 10 January 1970 (age 56); São Paulo, Brazil
- Genres: Pagode; Romantic pagode; Samba
- Occupations: Singer, musician, composer

Paulo Alexandre Nogueira Salgado Martins, better known by his stage name Salgadinho (born 10 January 1970), is a Brazilian pagode and samba singer and composer. He is most well known for being a member of the pagode group Katinguelê.

== Biography ==
Salgadinho was born in 1970 in São Paulo. He began his musical career as a cavaquinho player for Katinguelê, of which he became its main singer and composer during the 1990s, when the group reached its peak in popularity. As part of the group, he composed some of the biggest hits in pagode during the 1990s, such as "No compasso do criador", "Inaraí", "Recado a Minha Amada", "Um Doce Sabor", "Cilada", "Corpo Lúcido", and "Pra gente matar a saudade", among others. He also hosted, along with Netinho de Paula and Kelly Key, the program Samba, Pagode & Cia. on Rede Globo, which stayed on the air for only two months in 1999.

In 2001, Salgadinho left Katinguelê to dedicate his time to his solo career. He returned to his old group for a brief period starting in 2008, but left again in 2010 and returned to his solo projects.

He has also been a member of the musical project Amigos do Pagode 90 since 2014, together with other famous names in the pagode scene during the 90s, such as Márcio Art, Chrigor, and Netinho de Paula.

On 26 April 2019, he released the single "Sol e sal", with Ferrugem as a guest singer.

In 2020, he released the EP “Salgadinho Experience”. The same year, he launched the online course "Academia do Cavaquinho", where he teaches the technical aspect of playing the cavaquinho to both beginners and experienced musicians.
