= Cumbayá (song) =

Single by Pee Wee

from the album Yo Soy
- Released: June 30, 2009
- Recorded: 2009
- Genre: Latin pop
- Length: 3:33
- Label: EMI
- Songwriters: Francisco Saldaña; Irvin Salinas; Norgie Noriega
- Producers: Francisco "Luny" Saldaña; Norgie Noriega

Pee Wee singles chronology
"Carita Bonita" (2008)	"Cumbayá" (2009)	"Quédate" (2009)

"Cumbayá" is the first single from Pee Wee debut studio album Yo Soy released on May 26, 2009, released worldwide on June 1, 2009 and released on June 30, 2009 on iTunes, the song was produced under Mas Flow Inc by the producers Luny Tunes. The song was included on the album from soundtrack of telenovela Camaleones of the same name.

== Background ==
About the meaning of the name of the song, he said: "Cumbaya in the 30s... for those who were slaves was God almighty, was that being to which they prayed to ward off the bad times".

== Music video ==
Pee Wee in the music video for "Cumbayá".

The music video was directed by Carlos Pérez and filmed on a desert of Los Angeles, Cal. Through the video, Pee Wee fights against temptation until he finally surrenders, the concept of the video is show a boy who is going crazy because of a girl who he fell in love with. The music video was premiered on Primer Impacto, Univision on June 23, 2009.

== Track listing ==
- Digital download
1. "Cumbayá" (single version) – 3:36
- Digital download – Cumbia
1. "Cumbayá" (Cumbia version) – 3:39

== Versions ==
- Cumbayá (album version) - 3:33
- Cumbayá (single version) - 3:36
- Cumbayá (remix) (featuring Arcángel) - 3:31
- Cumbayá (Cumbia version) - 3:39

== Charts ==
Chart (2009)	Peak position
U.S. Billboard Hot Latin Songs	29
U.S. Billboard Latin Pop Songs	22
U.S. Billboard Tropical Songs	26
U.S. Billboard Regional Mexican Songs	37
