= 2008 Premios Juventud =

5th Premios Juventud
- Date: July 17, 2008
- Location: Watsco Center in Miami, Florida
- Hosted by: Eduardo Santamarina, Mayrin Villanueva, RBD
- Website: Official Page

Television/radio coverage
- Network: Univision

The 5th Annual Premios Juventud (Youth Awards) were broadcast by Univision on July 17, 2008.

== Audience ==
The broadcast attracted an average audience of 5.2 million viewers and was the top-rated program of the evening among adults 18-34, attracting more viewers than all of its English-language competitors, including Are You Smarter Than a 5th Grader?, So You Think You Can Dance, Greatest American Dog, CSI, Swingtown, Last Comic Standing, Fear Itself, Ugly Betty, Grey's Anatomy, and Hopkins.

== Presenters & Arrivals ==
- Adriana Fonseca
- Akwid
- Alacranes Musical
- Alexandra Cheron
- Alexis & Fido
- Alfonso Herrera
- Anahí
- Angel & Khriz
- Aventura
- Black Guayaba
- Belanova
- Chenoa
- Claudio Reyna
- Cristian Chavez
- Christopher Uckermann
- Dulce Maria
- Eduardo Santamarina
- Enrique Iglesias
- Flex
- Fonseca
- Gabriela Vergara
- Gloria Trevi
- Ivy Queen
- Jimena
- Jorge Ramos
- Julian Gil
- Kudai
- Lorna Paz
- Los Tucanes de Tijuana
- Luis Fonsi
- Marlene Favela
- Mayrín Villanueva
- Melissa Marty
- Menudo
- Miguelito
- Olga Tañón
- Omar Chaparro
- Patricia Manterola
- Pee Wee
- Pedro Fernández
- Rafael Mercadante
- RBD
- Scarlet Ortiz
- Thalía
- Tito El Bambino
- Toby Love
- Tommy Torres
- Víctor González
- Wisin & Yandel

== Performers ==
The following is a list of musical artists in order of performance:

- Intro — "Premios Juventud 2008" 01:31
- RBD Performed Y No Puedo Olvidarte 04:52
- Olga Tañón With Tito "El Bambino" Performed En La Disco 03:42
- Enrique Iglesias with Aventura performed "Lloro Por Ti" 04:12
- Los Tucanes de Tijuana performed La Chica Sexy
- Akwid with Los Tucanes de Tijuana performed Ombligo A Ombligo
- Pee Wee, formerly of the Kumbia Kings and Kumbia All Starz performed Life Is A Dance Floor
- Pedro Fernández performed a medley of his biggest hits 11:09
- Luis Fonsi performed No Me Doy Por Vencido
- Thalía performed "Ten Paciencia" 03:29
- Flex performed Te Quiero
- Gloria Trevi performed Cinco Minutos 03:36
- Angel & Khriz performed La Vecina
- Alacranes Musical performed Dame Tu Amor
- Menudo performed Perdido Sin Ti
- Belanova performed "Cada Que..." & "Baila Mi Corazón"
- Fonseca performed Enrédame

== Winners and nominees ==
The following is a list of the nominees and winners (in bold) in the fourteen music-related categories. The reggaeton duo Wisin & Yandel won four awards.

Music awards

=== La Combinación Perfecta ===
1. "Soy Igual Que Tú" - Alexis & Fido feat. Toby Love
2. "Mochila de Amor" - Miguelito feat. Divino
3. **"Inalcanzable (Remix)" - RBD feat. Jowell & Randy & De La Ghetto**
4. "Oye, ¿Dónde Está El Amor?" - Wisin & Yandel feat. Franco De Vita
5. "Sexy Movimiento (Remix)" - Wisin & Yandel feat. Nelly Furtado

=== Que Rico Se Mueve ===
1. **Chayanne**
2. Christopher von Uckermann
3. Dulce María
4. Ricky Martin
5. Shakira

=== Voz Del Momento ===
1. **Aventura**
2. Camila
3. Enrique Iglesias
4. RBD
5. Wisin & Yandel

=== Me Muero Sin Ese CD ===
1. El Cartel: The Big Boss - Daddy Yankee
2. Empezar Desde Cero - RBD
3. La Vida... Es un Ratico - Juanes
4. **Wisin vs. Yandel: Los Extraterrestres - Wisin & Yandel**
5. Todo Cambió (Special Edition) - Camila

=== Mi Concierto Favorito ===
1. Maná - Amar es Combatir Tour
2. RBD - Tour Celestial / Empezar desde Cero World Tour
3. Juanes - La Vida Tour
4. Daddy Yankee - The Big Boss Tour
5. **Aventura - K.O.B. Tour**

=== Canción Corta-Venas ===
1. "¿Dónde Están Corazón?" - Enrique Iglesias
2. "Inalcanzable" - RBD
3. "Sólo Para Ti" - Camila
4. "Te Quiero" - Flex
5. **"Todo Cambió" - Camila**

=== Mi Video Favorito ===
1. "Empezar Desde Cero" - RBD
2. "Inalcanzable" - RBD
3. "Me Enamora" - Juanes
4. "Sexy Movimiento" - Wisin & Yandel
5. **"Te Quiero" - Flex**

=== Mi Artista Regional Mexicano ===
1. Alacranes Musical
2. **Alejandro Fernández**
3. Jenni Rivera
4. Pepe Aguilar
5. Vicente Fernández

=== Mi Artista Pop ===
1. Belinda
2. **Camila**
3. Enrique Iglesias
4. RBD
5. Ricky Martin

=== Mi Artista Tropical ===
1. **Aventura**
2. Juan Luis Guerra
3. Marc Anthony
4. Olga Tañón
5. Víctor Manuelle

=== Mi Artista Urbano ===
1. Daddy Yankee
2. Don Omar
3. Flex
4. Ivy Queen
5. **Wisin & Yandel**

=== Mi Artista Rock ===
1. Alejandra Guzmán
2. Belinda
3. Black Guayaba
4. Juanes
5. **Maná**

=== Mi Ringtone ===
1. "Ay Chico (Lengua Afuera)" - Pitbull
2. "Impacto" - Daddy Yankee
3. "Rompe" - Daddy Yankee
4. "Un Beso" - Aventura
5. **"Yo Te Quiero" - Wisin & Yandel**

Fashion and Image awards

Four fashion and image awards were presented (winners in bold).

=== Quiero Vestir Como Ella ===
1. Alejandra Espinoza
2. Anahí
3. Dayanara Torres
4. Dulce María
5. **Jennifer Lopez**

=== El Del Mejor Estilo ===
1. Alfonso Herrera
2. Anthony "Romeo" Santos
3. Christopher von Uckermann
4. Daddy Yankee
5. **Ricky Martin**

=== ¡Está Buenísimo! ===
1. Alfonso Herrera
2. Christopher von Uckermann
3. Daddy Yankee
4. Enrique Iglesias
5. **Ricky Martin**

=== Chica Que Me Quita El Sueño ===
1. Alejandra Espinoza
2. Anahí
3. Dulce María
4. **Jennifer Lopez**
5. Maite Perroni

Movie awards

Three movie awards were presented (winners in bold).

=== ¡Qué Actorazo! ===
1. Antonio Banderas - (Shrek the Third)
2. Eduardo Verástegui - (Bella)
3. **Fernando Colunga - (Ladrón Que Roba Ladrón)**
4. Javier Bardem - (Amor en los Tiempos del Cólera & No Country for Old Men)
5. Kuno Becker - (Sex and Breakfast)

=== Actriz Que Se Roba La Pantalla ===
1. Jennifer Lopez - (El Cantante)
2. Jessica Alba - (Awake), (Good Luck Chuck), (Los Cuatro Fantásticos), & (The Eye)
3. **Kate del Castillo - (Trade)**
4. Penélope Cruz - (The Good Night)
5. Roselyn Sánchez - (The Game Plan)

=== Película Más Padre ===
1. Amor en los Tiempos del Cólera
2. Bella
3. El Cantante
4. **Ladrón Que Roba Ladrón**
5. Maldeamores

Pop culture awards

Three other pop culture awards were presented (winners in bold).

=== Mi Ídolo Es... ===
1. Anahí
2. Daddy Yankee
3. Dulce María
4. Juanes
5. **Ricky Martin**

=== Tórridos Romances ===
1. Aracely Arámbula & Luis Miguel
2. Camila Sodi & Diego Luna
3. **Jackie Guerrido & Don Omar**
4. Jennifer Lopez & Marc Anthony
5. Kate del Castillo & Aarón Díaz

=== En La Mira Del Paparazzi ===
1. Jennifer Lopez
2. **Jennifer Lopez & Marc Anthony**
3. Luis Miguel
4. Niurka Marcos
5. RBD

Sports awards

Four sports awards were presented (winners in bold).

=== El Deportista De Alto Voltaje ===
1. **Alex Rodríguez - (New York Yankees)**
2. Cuauhtémoc Blanco - (Chicago Fire)
3. Guillermo Ochoa - (Club América)
4. Omar Bravo - (Club Deportivo Guadalajara)
5. Rafael Márquez - (FC Barcelona)

=== La Deportista De Alta Tensión ===
1. Ana Guevara - (Athletics)
2. **Lorena Ochoa - (Mexican Golfer)**
3. Maribel Domínguez - (Female Soccer Player)
4. Milka Duno - (Female Race car driver)
5. Sofía Mulánovich - (Peruvian Surfer)

=== Me Pongo La Camiseta De... ===
1. Cruz Azul
2. Club América
3. Club Deportivo Guadalajara
4. **New York Yankees**
5. Mexico National Football Team

=== La Nueva Promesa ===
1. Alexandre Pato - (A.C. Milan)
2. César Villaluz - (Cruz Azul)
3. Luis Ernesto Michel - (Club Deportivo Guadalajara)
4. Sergio Ávila - (Club Deportivo Guadalajara)
5. **Robinson Canó - (New York Yankees)**
