= Kelly Key – Ao Vivo =

Kelly Key - Ao Vivo

Live album by Kelly Key
- Released: January 20, 2004
- Recorded: 2003
- Genre: Pop
- Length: 41:11
- Language: Portuguese
- Label: Warner Music

Kelly Key chronology
Do Meu Jeito (2003)	Kelly Key - Ao Vivo (2004)	Kelly Key (2005)

Singles from Kelly Key
- 1. "Por Causa de Você" Released: January 9, 2004

Kelly Key – Ao Vivo is the first live album by Brazilian pop singer Kelly Key, released on January 20, 2004.

== Track listing ==
Standard version
No.	Title	Writer(s)	Length
1.	"Escondido"	Kelly Key, Andinho	3:08
2.	"Adoleta"	Gustavo Lins, Umberto Tavares, Victor Junior	3:34
3.	"Quién Eres Tú?"	Andinho	2:57
4.	"Anjo"	Kelly Key, Andinho	3:07
5.	"Por Causa de Você"	Andinho	4:04
6.	"Como Eu Quero"	Paula Toller	3:07
7.	"Só Quero Ficar"	Kelly Key	3:48
8.	"Medley: A Loirinha, o Playboy e o Negão / Então Beija"	Umberto Tavares, Andinho, Kelly Key	5:51
9.	"Chic, Chic"	Gustavo Lins, Umberto Tavares, Andinho	3:08
10.	"Baba"	Kelly Key	3:44
11.	"Medley: Biquíni de Bolinha Amarelinha / Banho de Lua / Estúpido Cupido"	Franco Migliacci, Bruno De Filippi, Neil Sedaka, Howard Greenfield, Fred Jorge	3:08
12.	"Cachorrinho"	Andinho	4:11
13.	"Chic Chic (Cuca Club House Mix)"	Andinho	5:33
14.	"Por Causa De Você (Cuca Beat Club Mix)"	Gustavo Lins, Umberto Tavares, Victor Junior	6:44

DVD
No.	Title	Writer(s)	Length
1.	"Escondido"	Kelly Key, Andinho	3:08
2.	"Adoleta"	Gustavo Lins, Umberto Tavares, Victor Junior	3:34
3.	"Quién Eres Tú?"	Andinho	2:57
4.	"Anjo"	Kelly Key, Andinho	3:07
5.	"Por Causa de Você"	Andinho	4:04
6.	"Como Eu Quero"	Paula Toller	3:07
7.	"Só Quero Ficar"	Kelly Key	3:48
8.	"Medley: A Loirinha, o Playboy e o Negão / Então Beija"	Umberto Tavares, Andinho, Kelly Key	5:51
9.	"Chic, Chic"	Gustavo Lins, Umberto Tavares, Andinho	3:08
10.	"Baba"	Kelly Key	3:44
11.	"Medley: Biquíni de Bolinha Amarelinha / Banho de Lua / Estúpido Cupido"	Franco Migliacci, Bruno De Filippi, Neil Sedaka, Howard Greenfield, Fred Jorge	3:08
12.	"Cachorrinho"	Andinho	4:11
13.	"Bis: Adoleta"	Gustavo Lins, Umberto Tavares, Victor Junior	3:34

== Certifications ==
Country	Certification	Sales/shipments
Brazil (ABPD)	Gold	50.000
