= Kelly Key (2001 album) =

Studio album by Kelly Key
- Released: December 22, 2001
- Recorded: 2000–01
- Genres: Pop; dance-pop; R&B
- Length: 45:02
- Language: Portuguese
- Label: Warner Music
- Producers: Sérgio Mama; DJ Cuca

Kelly Key chronology
Kelly Key (2001)	Remix Hits (2002)

Singles from Kelly Key
- 1. "Escondido" Released: June 18, 2001; 2. "Baba" Released: November 5, 2001; 3. "Anjo" Released: April 17, 2002; 4. "Cachorrinho" Released: August 30, 2002

Kelly Key is the debut album by Brazilian singer-songwriter Kelly Key, released on December 22, 2001, by Warner Music. The album consists of ten original songs co-written by Kelly, alongside Andinho, Gustavo Lins, and Rubens de Paula, with a remix of "Escondido" as a bonus track. The album blends R&B and dance-pop, drawing influence from American artists like Britney Spears, Jennifer Lopez, and Janet Jackson.

The album marked a significant moment in Brazilian pop culture, quickly rising to the top of the charts and becoming a commercial success. It was certified platinum in Brazil, with over a million copies sold, and positioned Kelly Key as one of the first pop icons in Brazil. The album's themes of female empowerment and independence set it apart from previous Brazilian pop music, giving it lasting influence.

== Development and production ==
In Spring 1999, Kelly Key was working as a TV host on the show Samba, Pagode & Cia., where she first met music producer DJ Cuca, who would later become instrumental in her early career. While observing a session for the album 2000 by the Brazilian artist Latino, Kelly volunteered to provide backing vocals; her vocal performance impressed DJ Cuca, who encouraged her to get involved in an upcoming pop music project.

As Kelly Key recalled in her interview with G1 Globo, DJ Cuca told her: “You sing well. I have a really cool project here. We can do something interesting.” He had already prepared several instrumental tracks and invited Kelly to write lyrics. Drawing from her personal writings—many of which came from her teenage diaries—Kelly began to craft the lyrics that would shape her debut album. She had long been shy about sharing her personal thoughts, but this project gave her the opportunity to turn them into music. Alongside MC Andinho, a major figure in the funk carioca scene, Kelly further developed these songs in one week.

After the album was finished, it was shopped to different record labels, and eventually picked up by Warner Music for release.

== Music and lyrics ==
Kelly Key marked a notable departure from the music of Brazilian pop singers in the late 1990s and early 2000s. While many artists of that time focused on romantic melodies and themes that portrayed women as dependent on men, Kelly Key's debut album brought a fresh perspective. The album centered on themes of female empowerment, independence, and sexuality, which aligned it with a broader women's movement in Brazil and beyond.

Musically, the album blends elements of pop and R&B, with strong influences from dance-pop, bubblegum pop, and hip-hop, drawing inspiration from the American pop music scene. Kelly Key's sound, shaped by DJ Cuca's production, embraced catchy, upbeat rhythms that appealed to a younger audience while delivering substantive messages. The lyrics explored themes such as female sexuality, feminism, and love, portraying women as strong, independent figures.

The album resonated with listeners through its realistic and explicit portrayal of issues faced by young women, which allowed it to connect with its audience. Songs featured bold narratives about relationships, desire, and empowerment, often challenging traditional gender roles.

== Promotion ==
"Escondido" was the first single released from the album in June 2001. Despite facing initial radio resistance due to its lyrics, the song later gained popularity after the release of Kelly's follow-up single. In November 2001, "Baba" (re-titled as "Baba Baby") was released as the second single from the album, and became her breakout hit, eventually reaching the No. 1 position on the Brazilian charts. "Anjo" was released as the third single in April 2002, while "Cachorrinho" was released as the album's fourth and final single in August 2002.

For the Hispanic America market, a Spanish-language version of the album was released in 2002, Kelly Key en Español. In Chile, a Spanish-language version of "Baba" was released in early 2002 as the first single for the Spanish-language version of the album, while "Cachorrito" was released as the album's second single in November 2002.

== Critical reception ==
The album received mostly positive reviews. Alex Antunes of Portal Dedo do Meio praised the work for addressing gender and feminism in a way that was both natural and accessible, without relying on profanity. He noted that the album's approach felt less "virginal" than other Brazilian pop romantic music at the time, making it easier for young people to connect with Kelly Key's message. Contém Pop highlighted that the album was well-structured and made a significant contribution to the development of Brazilian pop music.

Naiady Piva of Portal Pop compared the album to Britney Spears' ...Baby One More Time, pointing out similarities in both artists' ability to appeal to a youthful audience. Carlos Eduardo Lima of Scream & Yell magazine remarked that the album broke away from the "prefabricated, good-looking hypocrisy" often seen in Brazilian pop music, portraying youth culture as something more genuine and rebellious. He also noted that Kelly Key's album stood in stark contrast to the more conservative image of artists like Sandy & Junior.

== Track listing ==
No.	Title	Writer(s)	Length
1.	"Escondido"	Kelly Key, Andinho	4:28
2.	"Só Quero Ficar"	Key	3:38
3.	"Bolada"	Key, Gustavo Lins, Andinho	3:20
4.	"Anjo"	Key	3:07
5.	"Baba"	Key	3:32
6.	"Brincar de Amor"	Key, Lins, Andinho	3:04
7.	"Tudo com Você"	Key	4:04
8.	"Quem é Você?"	Key, Andinho	2:57
9.	"Viajar no Groove"	Key	2:50
10.	"Cachorrinho"	Key, Andinho	4:11

== Charts ==
=== Year-end charts ===
Chart (2002)	Peak position
Brazilian Albums (Pro-Música Brasil)	17

== Certifications ==
Country	Certification	Sales/shipments
Brazil (ABPD)	Platinum	1,000,000+
Portugal (AFP)	Gold	20,000

== Release history ==
Region	Date	Format	Label
Brazil	December 22, 2001	CD	Warner Music
United States	October 6, 2002	Digital download	Warner Music
Chile	June 13, 2002	CD (Kelly Key en Español)	Warner Music
Argentina	June 13, 2002	CD (Kelly Key en Español)	Warner Music
Uruguay	June 13, 2002	CD (Kelly Key en Español)	Warner Music
Peru	June 13, 2002	CD (Kelly Key en Español)	Warner Music
Colombia	September 1, 2002	CD (Kelly Key en Español)	Warner Music
