= Via Funchal =

Multi-purpose arena in São Paulo, Brazil

- Interactive map of Via Funchal
- Address: Rua Funchal, 65
- Location: São Paulo, Brazil
- Coordinates: 23°35′34.39″S 46°41′14.7″W
- Owner: Cássio and Jorge Maluf
- Capacity: 3,120 (seated); 6,000 (standing)
- Field size: 6,000 m^{2} (65,000 sq ft)

Construction
- Opened: 10 September 1998
- Closed: 16 December 2012
- Demolished: 2013
- Years active: 1998–2012

Via Funchal, with an area of 15,000 m^{2}, was an arena in São Paulo, Brazil, that hosted many events, such as concerts and other shows before closing in December 2012.
Seated, it hosted 3,120 people and standing, it hosted as many as 6,000 people.

== Artists that have performed at Via Funchal include ==
Date	Event
2004
22 March 2004	B.B. King
23 March 2004	B.B. King
25 March 2004	B.B. King
3 April 2004	Charlie Brown Jr.
4 April 2004	Charlie Brown Jr.
29 April 2004	Gloria Gaynor
30 April 2004	CPM 22
24 May 2004	Massive Attack
25 May 2004	Massive Attack
16 July 2004	The Black Eyed Peas
1 October 2004	Danni Carlos
2 October 2004	Cradle of Filth
3 October 2004	Cradle of Filth
30 October 2004	Angra
8 November 2004	Nightwish
12 November 2004	David Sanborn
20 November 2004	Seu Jorge
30 November 2004	Laura Fygi
8 December 2004	Norah Jones
9 December 2004	Norah Jones
2005
26 January 2005	Diana Krall
27 January 2005	Diana Krall
19 February 2005	Falamansa
25 February 2005	Seu Jorge
4 March 2005	Marcelo D2
5 March 2005	Marcelo D2
15 April 2005	Ray Wilson
16 April 2005	CPM 22
20 April 2005	Natiruts
30 April 2005	Barão Vermelho
4 May 2005	George Benson
5 June 2005	Nando Reis
11 June 2005	Billy Paul
25 August 2005	Kid Abelha
3 September 2005	Kid Abelha
1 October 2005	Milton Nascimento & Caetano Veloso
2 October 2005	Milton Nascimento & Caetano Veloso
15 October 2005	Demis Roussos
21 October 2005	Margareth Menezes
8 November 2005	Ana Carolina
16 November 2005	B. J. Thomas
19 November 2005	Charlie Brown Jr.
23 November 2005	Madeleine Peyroux
25 November 2005	Dani Carlos
29 November 2005	Fábio Jr.
3 December 2005	Kamelot & Epica
6 December 2005	Felipe Dylon
8 December 2005	Madredeus
10 December 2005	Los Hermanos
14 December 2005	Voz da Verdade
2006
24-31 January 2006	O Parque Musical do Barney e seus Amigos
3 March 2006	The Gathering
9 March 2006	Jammil e uma Noites
10 March 2006	Ultraje a Rigor
21 April 2006	Destruction, Atrocity & Leaves' Eyes
4 May 2006	Rufio & MxPx
5 May 2006	America
13 May 2006	Chitãozinho e Xororó
14 May 2006	Chitãozinho e Xororó
19 May 2006	The Sisters of Mercy
20 May 2006	Babado Novo
24 May 2006	Gloria Gaynor
25 May 2006	Laura Fygi
7 June 2006	O Rappa
10 June 2006	Billy Paul
13 July 2006	Banda Eva
28 July 2006	Santa Esmeralda & Frenéticas
4 August 2006	Dani Carlos
12 August 2006	Stryper
19 August 2006	Yellowcard
29 August 2006	Dionne Warwick
31 August 2006	Charlie Brown Jr.
2 September 2006	Slayer
5 September 2006	Jamie Cullum
6 October 2006	Marcelo D2
12-15 October 2006	O Parque Musical do Barney e seus Amigos
20 October 2006	Inimigos da HP
28 October 2006	Lulu Santos
8 November 2006	Grupo Tradição
10 November 2006	The Rasmus
14 November 2006	New Order
15 November 2006	Emmerson Nogueira
18 November 2006	Angra
19 November 2006	Video Games Live
3 December 2006	B.B. King
2007
17 January 2007	Babado Novo
22 January 2007	Ben Harper
24 January 2007	Jammil e uma Noites
31 January 2007	Asa de Águia
1 February 2007	Arch Enemy
7 February 2007	Rapazolla
10 February 2007	Deftones
26 February 2007	Coldplay
27 February 2007	Coldplay
28 February 2007	Coldplay
2 March 2007	Jammil e uma Noites
9 March 2007	Diante do Trono
10 March 2007	Diante do Trono
17 March 2007	Blind Guardian
22 March 2007	Marcelo D2
27 March 2007	The Stylistics
18 April 2007	Detonautas & Jota Quest
25 April 2007	RBD
26 April 2007	RBD
29 April 2007	Motörhead
11 May 2007	Camisa de Vênus
14 May 2007	Bajofondo
15 May 2007	Lobão
16 June 2007	Symphony X
20 June 2007	Gotan Project
21 July 2007	The Beats
10 August 2007	No Use for a Name
11 August 2007	Capital Inicial
21 August 2007	Dionne Warwick
28 August 2007	Dolores O'Riordan
30 August 2007	Living Colour
16 September 2007	Video Games Live
18 September 2007	Madeleine Peyroux
21 September 2007	Seu Jorge
26 September 2007	Marilyn Manson
29 September 2007	Sandy e Júnior
30 September 2007	Sandy e Júnior
4 October 2007	Banda Blitz
16 October 2007	Akon
18 October 2007	Mercedes Sosa
19 October 2007	Isabella Taviani
27 October 2007	Marisa Monte
30 October 2007	Kenny G
3 November 2007	Zucchero
12 November 2007	Toto
13 November 2007	LCD Soundsystem
6 December 2007	Bebel Gilberto
4 December 2007	Gotan Project
22 December 2007	Banda Eva
2008
17 January 2008	Eagle-Eye Cherry
21 January 2008	Hilary Duff
22 January 2008	Hilary Duff
15 February 2008	Earth, Wind and Fire
18 February 2008	My Chemical Romance
19 February 2008	My Chemical Romance
5 March 2008	Bob Dylan
6 March 2008	Bob Dylan
11 March 2008	Interpol
13 March 2008	Fergie
19 March 2008	Sean Kingston
28 March 2008	Omara Portuondo & Maria Bethânia
12 April 2008	Isabella Taviani
18 April 2008	Charles Aznavour
25 April 2008	The Beats
8 May 2008	Village People
9 May 2008	Rufus Wainwright
10 May 2008	RBD
11 May 2008 (14pm and 19pm)	RBD
12 May 2008	Eva Yerbabuena
14 May 2008	Bajofondo
17 May 2008	John Mayall
1 June 2008	Maria Rita
7 June 2008	Billy Paul
16 June 2008	Joss Stone
2 July 2008	Echo and The Bunnymen
8 July 2008	Banda Eva
22 July 2008	Katinguelê
31 July 2008	Edinho Santa Cruz e Banda
4 August 2008	Frank Sinatra Jr.
15 August 2008	Nando Reis
18 August 2008	Dionne Warwick
23 August 2008	NX Zero
3 September 2008	Michael Bolton
9 September 2008	Boy George
11 September 2008	Charles Aznavour
8 October 2008	McFly
9 October 2008	McFly
11 October 2008	LazyTown
15 October 2008	KT Tunstall
18 October 2008	Frejat
28 October 2008	Michel Legrand
4 November 2008	Julio Iglesias
5 November 2008	Julio Iglesias
7 November 2008	Nightwish
8 November 2008	Nightwish
9 November 2008	Maroon 5
10 November 2008	R.E.M.
11 November 2008	R.E.M.
13 November 2008	Cyndi Lauper
14 November 2008	Cyndi Lauper
18 November 2008	Michael Bublé
19 November 2008	Michael Bublé
20 November 2008	Michael Bublé
21 November 2008	Duran Duran
22 November 2008	Duran Duran
26 November 2008	Queen + Paul Rodgers
27 November 2008	Queen + Paul Rodgers
4 December 2008	Madeleine Peyroux

Date	Event
2009
27 January 2009	Orishas
29 January 2009	James Blunt
3 February 2009	Alanis Morissette
14 February 2009	Peter Murphy
6 March 2009	Deep Purple
7 March 2009	Deep Purple
8 March 2009	Julio Iglesias
19 March 2009	Liza Minnelli
21 March 2009	NX Zero
16 April 2009	Air Supply
18 April 2009	Motörhead
7 May 2009	Bajofondo
9 May 2009	Sepultura & Angra
21 May 2009	Os Paralamas do Sucesso & Vanessa da Mata
28 May 2009	McFly
29 May 2009	McFly
6 June 2009	The Sisters of Mercy
7 June 2009	George Benson
8 June 2009	George Benson
17 June 2009	Dianne Reeves
19 June 2009	The Kooks
8 July 2009	Banda Eva
18 July 2009	Cat Power
7 August 2009	Monobloco
12 August 2009	Information Society
15 August 2009	Little Joy
19 August 2009	Chuck Berry
11 September 2009	Beirut
12 September 2009	Children of Bodom & Amorphis
16 September 2009	Lily Allen
17 September 2009	Charles Aznavour
14 October 2009	Skank & Paula Toller
15 October 2009	Living Colour
23 October 2009	The Prodigy
31 October 2009	Kreator & Exodus
4 November 2009	Air Supply
5 November 2009	The Commodores
14 November 2009	Twisted Sister
19 November 2009	Jammil e uma Noites
29 November 2009	Seu Jorge
2010
21 January 2010	Eagle-Eye Cherry
26 January 2010	Akon
28 January 2010	Claudia Leitte
6 February 2010	Iced Earth
19 March 2010	B.B. King
20 March 2010	B.B. King
23 March 2010	Franz Ferdinand
25 March 2010	P.O.D.
27 March 2010	Nelly Furtado
10 April 2010	Epica
11 April 2010	Matisyahu
17 April 2010	Social Distortion
25 April 2010	Isa TKM
30 April 2010	Vanessa da Mata
2 May 2010	NX Zero
8 May 2010	Monobloco
14 May 2010	Roger Hodgson
15 May 2010	Isabella Taviani
20 May 2010	ZZ Top
21 May 2010	ZZ Top
22 May 2010	Johnny Winter
28 May 2010	Demi Lovato
30 May 2010	Jorge Vercilo
12 June 2010	Richard Marx
15 June 2010	50 Cent
23 June 2010	Jorge Drexler
22 July 2010	Chitãozinho e Xororó
24 July 2010	The Beats
27 July 2010	Chitãozinho e Xororó
17 August 2010	Simple Minds
20 August 2010	Maite Perroni
9 September 2010	Stacey Kent
17 September 2010	Peter Frampton
28 September 2010	Chitãozinho e Xororó
30 October 2010	Emily Osment
4 November 2010	Corinne Bailey Rae
10 November 2010	Belle and Sebastian
20 November 2010	Creedence Clearwater Revisited
22 November 2010	Scissor Sisters
23 November 2010	Tokio Hotel
24 November 2010	Caetano Veloso & Maria Gadu
25 November 2010	Jeff Beck
27 November 2010	Twisted Sister
30 November 2010	Rammstein
1 December 2010	Rammstein
3 December 2010	Pennywise
9 December 2010	Stone Temple Pilots
2011
29 January 2011	Motion City Soundtrack
29 January 2011	All Time Low
1 February 2011	Vampire Weekend
12 February 2011	Claudia Leitte
22 February 2011	Cyndi Lauper
23 February 2011	Cyndi Lauper
20 March 2011	Manu Gavassi
26 March 2011	Anahí & Christian Chávez
30 March 2011	Journey
1 April 2011	Air Supply
6 April 2011	The Human League
15 April 2011	Natalie Cole
16 April 2011	Motörhead
20 April 2011	3OH!3
13 May 2011	Sublime with Rome
14 May 2011	NX Zero
17 May 2011	Michael Bolton
18 May 2011	Kenny Rogers
25 May 2011	Lord of the Dance
26 May 2011	Lord of the Dance
27 May 2011	Lord of the Dance
28 May 2011	Lord of the Dance
29 May 2011	Lord of the Dance
30 May 2011	Dulce Maria
3 June 2011	Ute Lemper
4 June 2011	Symphony X
9 June 2011	Slayer
15 June 2011	Colin Hay
18 June 2011	Milton Nascimento
21 June 2011	Bruno e Marrone
20 July 2011	Bela e a Fera on Ice
21 July 2011	Bela e a Fera on Ice
22 July 2011	Bela e a Fera on Ice
23 July 2011	Bela e a Fera on Ice
24 July 2011	Bela e a Fera on Ice
26 July 2011	Limp Bizkit
28 July 2011	Bobby McFerrin
27 August 2011	Never Shout Never & Hey Monday
28 September 2011	Kesha
14 October 2011	Machine Head & Sepultura
21 October 2011	Caetano Veloso & Maria Gadú
22 October 2011	The Ultimate Tribute to ABBA
28 October 2011	O Rappa
29 October 2011	O Rappa
4 November 2011	Daniel and Orquestra Philarmônica São Paulo
8 November 2011	KC and The Sunshine Band
12 November 2011	The End Pink Floyd Connection
21 November 2011	Sandy
22 November 2011	Maria Bethânia & Chico Buarque
23 November 2011	Lulu Santos & Robert Carlos & Erasmo Carlos
24 November 2011	F1 Rocks São Paulo: Jessie J and Macy Gray
9 December 2011	Ben Harper
2012
3 February 2012	God Save the Queen
4 February 2012	Manu Chao, DJ China, Monbojó & Djs Criolina
5 February 2012	Selena Gomez & the Scene
7 March 2012	Marcus Viana & Sagrado Coração da Terra
9 March 2012	Jorge Ben Jor
10 March 2012	The Sisters of Mercy
29 March 2012	Joe Cocker
31 March 2012	Victor & Leo
1 April 2012	Michael Bublé
2 April 2012	Michael Bublé
14 April 2012	Almir Sater
26 April 2012	Roger Hodgson
10 May 2012	Crosby, Stills, Nash
11 May 2012	The Kooks
12 May 2012	Buddy Guy
17 May 2012	Letz Zep: Tribute to Led Zeppelin
20 May 2012	Smash Mouth
23 May 2012	Tribute to the Blues Brothers
24 May 2012	Tribute to the Blues Brothers
25 May 2012	Tribute to the Blues Brothers
26 May 2012	Tribute to the Blues Brothers
15 November 2012	Norah Jones
30 November 2012	Ivete Sangalo
