= Tan Feliz =

Song by Pee Wee

from the album Yo Soy
- Released: September 6, 2009
- Recorded: 2009
- Genre: Latin pop, reggaeton
- Length: 3:45
- Label: Streamline, Interscope, Kon Live
- Songwriter(s): Francisco Saldaña, Irvin Salinas, Norgie Noriega, Víctor Delgado
- Producer(s): Saldaña, Delgado

"Tan Feliz" (English: So Happy) is a song by American artist Pee Wee. The first version of the song was released on September 6, 2009, as a second promotional single from his debut studio album Yo Soy. The song was covered by Pee Wee featuring Brazilian pop singer Kelly Key from his second studio album, Déjate Querer, on February 4, 2011.

== Music video ==
A short music video was made exclusively for telenovela Camaleones in Colegio San Bartolomé that appears on the story, Sherlyn (Solange) and Ferdinando Valencia (Patricio) also appears on the video.

== Single version ==
"Tan Feliz"

Single by Pee Wee featuring Kelly Key
- Released: February 4, 2011
- Recorded: 2009
- Genre: Latin pop, reggaeton
- Length: 3:45
- Label: EMI
- Songwriter(s): Saldaña, Salinas, Noriega, Delgado
- Producer(s): Saldaña, Delgado

Pee Wee singles chronology
"Un Beso" (2010)	"Tan Feliz" (2011)	"Wanna Be Yours" (2011)

Kelly Key singles chronology
"Indecisão (Remix)" (2009)	"Tan Feliz" (2011)	""Shaking (Party People)" (2011)

"Tan Feliz" is a song by American artist Pee Wee release on February 4, 2011. The song, featuring Brazilian pop singer Kelly Key, was written by Pee Wee, Francisco Saldaña, Norgie Noriega and Víctor Delgado from her second studio album, Déjate Querer.

=== Background ===
On February 25, 2010, Kelly announced the negotiations with Pee Wee's agents for a featuring in her album. On April 13, the singer said on Twitter that she would record the song. On September 9, Kelly said he would embark for Mexico to record the song, a new version of Tan Feliz. The song will be released in January 2011.

=== Music video ===
The music video would be filmed in December 2010 in Miami, but was canceled.
