= Yo Soy (Pee Wee album) =

Studio album by Pee Wee
- Released: August 11, 2009
- Recorded: 2008–2009
- Genre: Latin pop
- Length: 40:26
- Label: EMI Latin
- Producers: Francisco "Luny" Saldaña, Norgie Noriega, Víctor "Predikador" Delgado, Rudy Maya, Carlos Lara, Gustavo Borner, Kike Santander, José Luis Arrollave, Mambo Kingz, Chuy Flores, Madmusick

Pee Wee chronology
Yo Soy (2009)	Déjate Querer (2011)

Singles from Yo Soy
- 1. "Cumbayá" Released: June 30, 2009; 2. "Quédate" Released: December 24, 2009

Professional ratings
Review scores
Source	Rating
Allmusic	3.5/5 stars

Yo Soy (English: I Am) is the debut studio album by Mexican-American singer Pee Wee. It was released on August 11, 2009, by EMI Latin.

== Singles ==
- "Cumbayá" was the lead single of the album. "Cumbayá" was released on May 26, 2009, and was released worldwide on June 1, 2009. "Cumbayá" was released on iTunes on June 30, 2009.
- "Quédate" was the second official single of the album. Pee Wee debuted the song live on El Show de los Sueños in November 2008. Back later the song was officially taken as the third official single on December 24, 2009.

Other songs

- "Life Is a Dance Floor" was the first solo track. Pee Wee sang the song live for the first time on 2008 Premios Juventud on July 17, 2008. It was thought that it would be the first single but it was never released as an official single or studio version, however for unknown reasons the song wasn't included on the album, only as a pre-order bonus track on iTunes.
- "Tan Feliz" was the promotional single of the album. "Tan Feliz" was released on September 6, 2009, and chosen to promote Camaleones.
- "Esto Es Amor" was a song that was recorded but wasn't included on the album. The song was released on Rhapsody.com on July 21, 2009.

== Track listing ==
No.	Title	Writer(s)	Length
1.	"Cumbayá"	Irvin Salinas; Francisco Saldaña; Norgie Noriega	3:33
2.	"Camaleones"	Salinas; Saldaña; Noriega; Richard Bull; Víctor Delgado	4:18
3.	"Quédate"	Salinas; Claudia Brant; Rudy Maya	3:16
4.	"Ese Sueño"	Salinas; Carlos Lara	3:15
5.	"Desesperado"	Rafael Pérez Botija	3:42
6.	"Tan Feliz"	Salinas; Saldaña; Noriega; Delgado	3:45
7.	"Rompecabezas"	Salinas; Dany Tomás; Servando Primera	3:26
8.	"La Reina de las Mujeres"	Salinas; Saldaña; Noriega	3:56
9.	"Ojos de Crystal"	Salinas; Saldaña; Noriega	4:17
10.	"Irresistible"	Chuy Flores; Nir Seroussi	2:52
11.	"Pergaminos"	Salinas; Saldaña; Noriega	4:06

iTunes pre-order bonus track
No.	Title	Writer(s)	Length
12.	"Life Is a Dance Floor"	Salinas; Rudy Maya; Guillermo Rosas; Lolene Everett	3:10

== Charts ==
Chart (2009)	Peak position	Provider
Mexico Top 100 Albums	23	AMPROFON
US Billboard 200	181	RIAA
US Billboard Top Latin Albums	4	RIAA
US Billboard Latin Pop Albums	1	RIAA
