= Dener (footballer, born 1995) =

Brazilian footballer

Personal information
- Full name: Dener Gonçalves Pinheiro
- Date of birth: 12 April 1995 (age 31)
- Place of birth: Carapicuíba, Brazil
- Height: 1.81 m (5 ft 11 in)
- Position: Midfielder

Team information
- Current team: Marcílio Dias

Youth career
- Figueirense

Senior career*
Years	Team	Apps	(Gls)
2013–2016	Figueirense	23	(1)
2018	Vila Nova	0	(0)
2019	Fagiano Okayama	0	(0)
2020	Sertãozinho	9	(1)
2020	Ferroviária	3	(0)
2021	Sertãozinho	13	(2)
2021	Figueirense	15	(0)
2022	Hercílio Luz	12	(0)
2022–	Marcílio Dias	4	(0)
- * Club domestic league appearances and goals as of 20:24, 30 May 2022 (UTC)

Dener Gonçalves Pinheiro (born 12 April 1995), simply known as Dener, is a Brazilian footballer who plays for as a midfielder for Marcílio Dias.

== Career ==
Born in Carapicuíba, São Paulo, Dener graduated with Figueirense's youth setup. On 12 July 2013 he made his first team debut, starting and being booked in a 3–2 away win against Atlético Goianiense for the Série B championship. He finished the campaign with eight appearances, as his side was promoted to Série A.

On 16 July 2014 Dener made his top level debut, starting in a 2–0 win at Coritiba.

Dener arrived at Fagiano Okayama for the 2019 season. But already on 3 March 2019 the club announced, that they had terminated the players contract by mutual consent, and the player would return to Brazil to treat his injury.

== Honours ==
- Campeonato Catarinense: 2014
