= Remix Hits =

Remix album by Kelly Key
- Released: April 2, 2002
- Recorded: 2000–2002
- Genre: Electropop
- Length: 62:01
- Language: Portuguese
- Label: Warner Music
- Producer: Plínio Profeta, DJ Mãozinha

Kelly Key chronology
Kelly Key (2001)	Remix Hits (2002)	Do Meu Jeito (2003)

Remix Hits is the first remix album by Brazilian pop singer Kelly Key, released on April 2, 2002, by Warner Music.

== Track listing ==
Standard version
No.	Title	Writer(s)	Length
1.	"Cachorrinho (The Groove pop mix)"	Kelly Key	4:36
2.	"Baba (Band FM remix)"	Kelly Key	3:40
3.	"Só Quero Ficar (Breakbeat remix)"	Kelly Key	4:20
4.	"Anjo (Cuca's Arabian mix)"	Kelly Key, Andinho	3:21
5.	"I Deserve It (FC Nand NYC edit mix)"	Ahmadzaï	3:27
6.	"Escondido (Cuca extend mix)"	Kelly Key, Andinho	3:43
7.	"Brincar de Amar (extended Tauz mix)" (feat. Billy)	Humberto Tavares, Andinho	3:40
8.	"Só Quero Ficar (Cuca's Bomb club mix)""	Kelly Key, Andinho	2:50
9.	"Anjo (Summer Beat mix)"	Kelly Key, Andinho	3:48
10.	"I Deserve It (Extended mix)"	Ahmadzaï	4:11
11.	"Baba (DJ PM Só Love extended mix)"	Kelly Key	3:38
12.	"Medley: Escondido / Só Quero Ficar / Baba / Anjo / Cachorrinho"	Kelly Key, Andinho, Gusvato Lins	4:50
13.	"Cachorrinho (karaokê)"	Kelly Key	5:23
14.	"Baba (karaokê)"	Kelly Key	5:58
15.	"Baba (video clip)"	Kelly Key	5:12

== Certifications ==
Country	Certification	Sales/shipments
Brazil (ABPD)	Gold	100.000
