= Negritude Júnior =

Brazilian pagode group

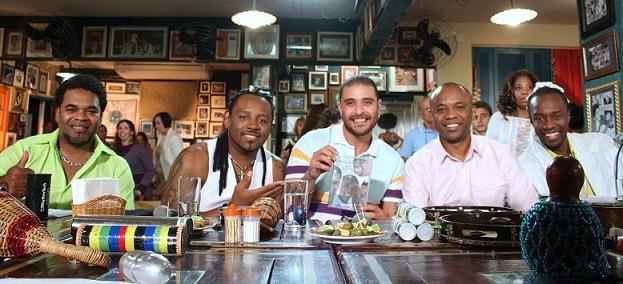
- Negritude Júnior, with Diogo Nogueira, on TV Brasil in 2013

Background information
- Origin: Carapicuíba, São Paulo, Brazil
- Genres: Pagode; Romantic pagode; Samba
- Years active: 1986–present
- Labels: Sony Music Brazil
- Members: Nênê; Ari; Feijão; Claudinho
- Past members: Netinho de Paula; Lino Izaguirre; Fabinho; Wagninho; Chamburcy

Negritude Júnior is a Brazilian pagode group from São Paulo, founded in 1986 in the suburb of Carapicuíba. Their biggest period of success came in the 1990s, where six of their albums had various hits on the record charts, with many albums reaching gold, platinum and double platinum status. The original line-up of the group included Netinho de Paula, Nenê, Wagninho, Claudinho, Feijão, Chambourcy, Ari, Lino, and Fabinho.

== History ==
Negritude Júnior was started in 1986 by Nenê, Wagninho and Claudinho. They met each other at the Camisa Verde e Branco samba school, where Almir Guineto was also a member. At that time, the members of the group were adolescents between the ages of 12 and 15. After winning a contest within the samba school, the group was invited to participate in a compilation album with two samba songs, "Triste Andança" and "Algo De Valor". Soon afterwards they independently released their first LP in 1992, Jeito de Seduzir (Zimbabwe). The LP caught the attention of EMI Odeon, which helped to release the group's second LP, Natural, which brought a certified gold song with "Conto de Fadas".

In 1994, Deixa Acontecer was released, with three hit songs: "Olhos Vermelhos", "Indiferença" and "Beijo Geladinho". The latter song, “Beijo Geladinho”, was featured on the soundtrack of the telenovela A Dona do Pedaço. On the fourth album, Gente da Gente, released in 1995, they had more hits such as "Absoluta", "Gente da Gente", "Cohab City" e "É Demais". Nosso Ninho, their fifth album, was made as a romantic tribute to women, with such songs as "Tanajura", "Você faz falta", and "Coração Cigano". The sixth album, Sedução Na Pele, released as a CD, was one of their most successful productions commercially, having reached double platinum status. Songs from the album, such as "Que Dure Para Sempre", "Sedução Na Pele" and "Bom Dia", reached the top of the Brazilian radio and TV charts.

In 2001, Netinho left the group to focus on his career as a TV presenter. In 2013, Netinho tried to return to the group and bring back the original line-up, but was unsuccessful. The following year, he formed the group Negritudeando, with Fabinho, Wagninho and Lino. However, due to a lawsuit made by the current members of Negritude Júnior, whom alleged that the name of the new group would harm the sales of their group, the name was changed to Família Cohab City.

In 2019, Ari temporarily stepped back from the group to treat complications from an autoimmune disorder.

== Discography ==
=== Studio albums ===
Year	Album details	Certifications (certified sales)
1992	Jeito de Seduzir: Released: 1992; Label: Zimbabwe	
1993	Natural: Released: 1993; Label: EMI	ABPD: Gold; Total sales: 100,000
1994	Deixa Acontecer: Released: 1994; Label: EMI	ABPD: Gold; Total sales: 100,000
1995	Gente da Gente: Released: 1995; Label: EMI	ABPD: Double platinum; Total sales: 500,000
1996	Nosso Ninho: Released: 1996; Label: EMI	ABPD: Double platinum; Total sales: 500,000
1997	Sedução na Pele: Released: 1997; Label: EMI	ABPD: Gold; Total sales: 100,000
1998	Porcelana: Released: 1998; Label: EMI	ABPD: Platinum; Total sales: 250,000
2000	Periferia: Released: 2000; Label: EMI	
2008	Atitude: Released: 2002	

=== Live albums ===
- 1999: Ao Vivo
- 2003: Ao Vivo II
- 2005: É Tudo Nosso
- 2016: Ao Vivo no Studio Showlivre
