= Pee Wee (singer) =

American singer and songwriter

- Also known as: Pee Wee González; Pee Wee Salinas; PW
- Born: Irvin Salinas; December 8, 1988 (age 37); Othello, Washington, US
- Origin: McAllen, Texas, U.S.
- Genres: Latin pop, cumbia, reggaeton, Tejano
- Occupations: Singer, songwriter, actor, dancer
- Instrument: Vocals
- Years active: 2003–present
- Labels: EMI Latin (2003–2011); Top Stop Music (2011–2012); Sony Music Latin (2012–2014); Universal Music Mexico (2016–present)
- Formerly of: Kumbia Kings; Kumbia All Starz
- Website: http://elpeewee.com/

Irvin Salinas Martinez (born December 8, 1988), known professionally as Pee Wee, is an American singer, songwriter, dancer, and actor. He was a former singer for the band Kumbia Kings and was a lead singer for Kumbia All Starz, both created by A.B. Quintanilla. In early 2008, he left Kumbia All Starz to become a solo artist. His debut studio album Yo Soy was released on August 11, 2009.

== Early life and career ==
=== Early life and discovery (1988–2003) ===
Irvin Salinas, known as Pee Wee, was born on December 8, 1988, in Othello, Washington to a Mexican-American family. He is the youngest of three siblings (his older sister named Elizabeth Salinas and his older brother Simon Salinas). His mother, María Martínez, changed residence to La Joya, Texas, located 18 miles west of McAllen, Texas. Irvin began to wash cars, wash dishes and perform other small jobs to provide his family with extra income. At thirteen, he met A.B. Quintanilla, brother of Selena, in a casting at Pee Wee's middle school. It was then that A.B. Quintanilla expressed interest in Pee Wee, and informed him about a casting for a music video with his band and offered him an audition. Irvin accepted, presenting to him a few days later in the casting. He also went to Memorial Middle School and La Joya High School.

=== Kumbia Kings (2003–06) ===
His artistic career began in 2003 when he joined A.B. Quintanilla's band Kumbia Kings after several members like Frankie J and DJ Kane left Kumbia Kings. In 2004, he recorded his first song and video with Kumbia Kings, "Sabes a Chocolate" on the album Los Remixes 2.0, released on April 6, 2004. Following the record's success, Quintanilla decided the absolute stay of Irvin, and nicknamed him "Pee Wee" for being the only minor in the band, at the time. It was on the album Fuego, released on October 5, 2004, that included "Na Na Na (Dulce Niña)."

On April 7, 2005, Pee Wee along with A.B. Quintanilla and the rest of the Kumbia Kings participated in Selena ¡VIVE!, the tribute concert for Selena, A.B. Quintanilla's sister, performing "Baila Esta Kumbia". Kumbia Kings later released the album Duetos on March 29, 2005, which included "Baila Esta Kumbia".

Kumbia Kings released their live album Kumbia Kings Live on April 4, 2006, which included the single "Pachuco". They won a Latin Grammy for the album Kumbia Kings Live.

Later, in August 2006, a legal disagreement between A.B. Quintanilla and Cruz Martínez, the co-producer of the band, resulted in A.B. Quintanilla leaving Kumbia Kings. Other members started to leave including Pee Wee who left Kumbia Kings after Cruz Martínez replaced him with Jo-Joe because he didn't show up for a concert. Pee Wee continued with A.B. Quintanilla and Chris Pérez (brother-in-law of Quintanilla), joining him in his following project that would be the band Kumbia All Starz.

=== Kumbia All Starz (2006–08) ===
In August 2006, Pee Wee became the lead singer for A.B. Quintanilla's new band Kumbia All Starz. Kumbia All Starz launched their single "Chiquilla" on September 19, 2006. The band released their debut album Ayer Fue Kumbia Kings, Hoy Es Kumbia All Starz on October 3, 2006. They also launched other singles in 2007, "Parece Que Va a Llover", "Speedy Gonzales", and "Mami/Anoche No Dormí". However, on February 1, 2008, it was announced that Pee Wee had left the band to begin a career as solo singer a month before the band's second album Planeta Kumbia was released. It is speculated that the leave was also attributed to mistreatment from A.B. Quintanilla, but was not confirmed.

=== Solo, Bust a Ritmo, El Show de los Sueños, Camaleones and Yo Soy (2008–11) ===
After he left the band Kumbia All Starz, Cruz Martínez invited Pee Wee to be a part of his band Los Super Reyes, but Pee Wee declined the invitation to pursue a career as solo artist. He collaborated with Erre XI on the song "Carita Bonita", released on February 19, 2008.

On June 16, 2008, he became the host of the series Bust a Ritmo on MTV Tr3s.

On July 17, 2008, Pee Wee made his debut as a solo artist in 2008 Premios Juventud performing "Life Is a Dance Floor". In September 2008, Pee Wee was invited by Rubén and Santiago Galindo to take part in the reality show El Show de los Sueños, production of Televisa, in the first season of El Show de los Sueños: Sangre de Mi Sangre where he competed with artists such as Gloria Trevi, Edith Márquez, Ernesto D'Alessio and Kalimba, along with Susana Fuente and Adriana Fuente, the Fuentes.

On October 27, 2008, Pee Wee and his team defeated Gloria Trevi and Kalimba in the final of El Show de los Sueños and gaining the right to take part in Los Reyes del Show. In A Telethon in 2008, Pee Wee declared that he was officially a Mexican citizen. He collaborated with other singers like RBD members Christopher Uckermann and Dulce María. On El Show de los Sueños he debuted a new song titled "Quédate" with La Nueva Banda Timbiriche.

In November 2008, Pee Wee opened the concerts for RBD during the Gira Del Adios World Tour in Brazil except for the two extra shows.

December 7, 2008, was the beginning of Los Reyes del Show where Pee Wee managed to make it to the finale of the program on December 14, 2008, where he again managed to win and defeat Gloria Trevi and Kalimba, gaining US$1,000,000.00. The money was distributed in US$333,333.00 between the 3 members of the team.

On March 26, 2009, Flex and Pee Wee sang together in Premios Lo Nuestro 2009 singing "Dime Si Te Vas Con Él". On May 29, 2009, he released his new single "Cumbayá". "Cumbayá" was released worldwide on June 1, 2009. "Cumbayá" was released on June 30, 2009, on iTunes. On July 5, performed the hit single "Carita Bonita" and a new single called "Tan Feliz" featuring two new Puerto Rican reggaeton singers Dyland & Lenny in Premios Tecate Deportes 2009. On July 16, 2009, Pee Wee performed for the first time, his new single "Cumbayá" in 2009 Premios Juventud. On July 27, 2009, the telenovela Camaleones premiered in Mexico in which Pee Wee stars as Ulises Morán.

On August 11, 2009, his debut studio album Yo Soy was released. On August 12, was scheduled to perform on Premios Texas 2010 from Austin, Texas. He was nominated for Best Male Artist.

=== Name change and second studio album (2011–present) ===
In 2011, Pee Wee changed his name to PW. He signed with Top Stop Music, a record label that features artists such as Prince Royce and Luis Enrique. His debut single as "PW", "Wanna Be Yours", was released on September 27, 2011. The dance track was produced by Sergio George and French producers So Fly and Nius. The video was shot at Universal Studios. His new album was released in February 2012.

On January 20, 2024, news broke that the singer had been arrested by the Hidalgo County Sheriff’s Department for driving under the influence in the city of Edinburg, TX. He was issued a bond of $1,500.

== Discography ==
=== Studio albums ===
List of albums, with selected chart positions
Title	Album details	Peak chart positions			
Title	Album details	US	US Latin	US Latin Pop	MEX
Yo Soy	Released: August 11, 2009; Label: EMI Latin; Format: CD, digital download	181	4	1	23
Vive2Life	Released: September 24, 2013; Label: Sony Music Latin, PW; Format: CD, digital download	—	52	10	64
El PeeWee	Released: September 9, 2016; Label: Universal Music México; Format: CD, digital download	—	—	—	—
"—" denotes releases that did not chart.

Unreleased albums

Title	Album details	Track listing
Déjate Querer	Released: December 7, 2010 (cancelled); Label: EMI Latin; Format: CD, digital download	Track listing: 1. "Me Sabe a Azúcar"; 2. "Un Beso"; 3. "Super Héroe"; 4. "Déjate Querer"; 5. "Tanto Amor"; 6. "Estrella Fugaz"; 7. "Pienso En Tí"; 8. "Loco Love"; 9. "Quien Será"; 10. "No Puedo Llorate Más"; 11. "Toma Mi Corazón"

=== EPs ===
Title	EP details
D.N.A.	Released: May 31, 2019; Label: Universal Music México; Format: Digital download, streaming

=== Singles ===
==== As main artist ====
List of singles, with selected chart positions
Title	Year	Peak chart positions				Album
Title	Year	US Latin	US Latin Pop	US Tropical	US Regional Mexican	Album
"Cumbayá"	2009	29	22	26	37	Yo Soy
"Quédate"	2009	49	29	—	—	Yo Soy
"Un Beso"	2010	—	—	—	—	Non-album singles
"Tan Feliz" (featuring Kelly Key)	2011	—	—	—	—	Non-album singles
"Wanna Be Yours" (featuring El Cata)	2011	46	—	—	—	Non-album singles
"Live Your Life"	2012	39	19	—	—	Vive2Life
"Duele Decirte Adios"	2013	23	10	—	—	Vive2Life
"Kukere"	2013	—	17	—	—	Vive2Life
"Cuando Llegaste"	2016	—	—	—	—	El PeeWee
"Con Tus Besos"	2016	—	—	—	—	El PeeWee
"Me Provoca y Me Domina"	2017	—	—	—	—	El PeeWee
"Tú Lo Sabes" (featuring Juan Magán)	2019	—	—	—	—	D.N.A.
"Quiero"	2019	—	—	—	—	D.N.A.
"—" denotes releases that did not chart or were not released.

==== As featured artist ====
List of singles, with selected chart positions
Title	Year	Peak chart positions	Album
Title	Year	SPA	Album
"Carita Bonita" (Erre XI featuring Pee Wee)	2008	—	Luny Tunes Presents: Erre XI
"Somos El Mundo 25 Por Haiti" (among Artists for Haiti)	2010	31	Charity single
"Que Cante la Vida" (among Artists for Chile)	2010	—	Charity single
"Lo Que Me Pasa" (Juan Magán featuring Pee Wee)	2012	—	The King of Dance
"The Final Frontier" (SI Stevens featuring Pee Wee)	2018	—	Non-album single
"—" denotes releases that did not chart or were not released.

==== Promotional singles ====
Title	Year	Album
"Life Is a Dance Floor"	2009	Yo Soy
"Tan Feliz" (solo version)	2009	Yo Soy

=== Other appearances ===
Title	Year	Other artist(s)	Album
"Carita Bonita (Remix)"	2009	Erre XI & Flex	Luny Tunes Presents: Erre XI
"Por Favor Quiéreme"	2009	Sherlyn	Camaleones
"Rompecabezas"	2009	—N/a	Camaleones
"Camaleones"	2009	—N/a	Camaleones

== Filmography ==
Telenovelas
Title	Role	Year	Notes
Camaleones	Ulises Morán	2009–2010	
TV shows
Title	Role	Year	Notes
Bust a Ritmo	Host	2008	
El Show de los Sueños	Contestant	2008	Winner
Los Reyes del Show	Contestant	2008	Winner

=== Videography ===
==== Music videos ====
Year	Song	Director(s)
2009	"Cumbayá"	Carlos Pérez
2009	"Tan Feliz"	Unknown
2009	"Por Favor Quiéreme" (with Sherlyn)	Unknown
2011	"Wanna Be Yours" (featuring El Cata)	Unknown

==== Guest music videos ====
Year	Song	Director(s)
2008	"Carita Bonita" (Erre XI featuring Pee Wee)	Unknown
2010	"Somos El Mundo 25 Por Haiti" (among Artists for Haiti)	Unknown
2010	"Que Cante la Vida" (among Artists for Chile)	Unknown
