= TV da Gente =

Television station in Fortaleza, Brazil

TV da Gente (ZYA 440)
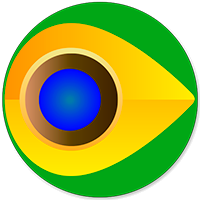

Pacajus, Ceará; Brazil
- Channels: Digital: 25 (UHF); Virtual: 25

Ownership
- Owner: Fundação Educativa Eduardo Sá

History
- First air date: 20 November 2005
- Former channel numbers: Analog: 19 (UHF, 2005-2017); Digital: 42 (UHF, 2017-2018)

Technical information
- Licensing authority: ANATEL

Links
- Website: wwww.tvdagenteceara.com

TV da Gente is a Brazilian television station with channel granted in Pacajus, and with soothes in Fortaleza, both cities of the state of Ceará. In the digital terrestrial television local, it operates on channel 25 UHF, and was inaugurated on November 20, 2005 by the singer and politician Netinho de Paula, with resources coming from the Fundação Educativa Eduardo Sá. Between 2005 and 2007, the station maintained its headquarters in São Paulo, and was a television network tuned by satellite, reaching some regions of the country. However, due to an administrative-financial crisis, it has lost its national coverage, and consequently no longer appears in all cities. Currently, the station has only open signal in the cities near Fortaleza. At the outset, it adopted a community format, and served to serve the black public.
