= Na Na Na (Dulce Niña) =

2005 single by Kumbia Kings

Single by A.B. Quintanilla y Los Kumbia Kings

from the album Fuego
- Released: April 4, 2005
- Recorded: 2004
- Genre: Cumbia music
- Length: 3:25
- Label: EMI Latin
- Songwriter(s): A.B. Quintanilla, Luigi Giraldo, Cruz Martínez
- Producer(s): A.B. Quintanilla, Cruz Martínez

A.B. Quintanilla y Los Kumbia Kings singles chronology
| "Baila Esta Kumbia" (2005) | "Na Na Na (Dulce Niña)" (2005) | "Parte de Mi Corazón" (2005) |

"Na Na Na (Dulce Niña)" (English: "Na Na Na (Sweet Girl)"), also known as "Mi Dulce Niña" (English: "My Sweet Girl"), is a song by Mexican-American cumbia group A.B. Quintanilla y Los Kumbia Kings. It was released in 2005 as the third single from their fourth studio album Fuego (2005).

The song was covered in 2006 by the Argentinian cumbia artist Chilli Fernandez and his little brother, Nico Fernandez.

== Personnel ==
- Written by A.B. Quintanilla, Luigi Giraldo, Cruz Martínez
- Produced by A.B. Quintanilla and Cruz Martínez
- Vocals by Pee Wee

== Charts ==
=== Weekly charts ===
| Chart (2005–2006) | Peak position |
|---|---|
| US Hot Latin Songs (Billboard) | 6 |
| US Latin Pop Airplay (Billboard) | 21 |
| US Latin Rhythm Airplay (Billboard) | 25 |
| US Regional Mexican Airplay (Billboard) | 12 |
| US Tropical Airplay (Billboard) | 11 |

=== Year-end charts ===
| Chart (2006) | Position |
|---|---|
| US Hot Latin Songs (Billboard) | 21 |

== Remix ==
"Na Na Na (Dulce Niña) (Remix)"

Single by A.B. Quintanilla y Los Kumbia Kings
- Released: 2005
- Recorded: 2004–2005
- Genre: Cumbia music, reggaeton
- Length: 3:48
- Label: EMI Latin
- Songwriter(s): A.B. Quintanilla, Luigi Giraldo, Cruz Martínez
- Producer(s): A.B. Quintanilla, Cruz Martínez

"Na Na Na (Dulce Niña) (Remix)", also known as "Mi Dulce Niña (Remix)", is a song by Mexican-American cumbia group A.B. Quintanilla y Los Kumbia Kings. The remix was released in 2005. It has Pee Wee singing with other Kumbia Kings members Abel Talamántez and Megga. A music video was recorded as well. Although the remix for "Na Na Na (Dulce Niña)" is a single for the album Fuego it is not part of the album.

=== Remix personnel ===
- Written by A.B. Quintanilla, Luigi Giraldo, Cruz Martínez
- Produced by A.B. Quintanilla and Cruz Martínez
- Vocals by Pee Wee, Abel Talamántez and Megga
- Background vocals by Roque Morales
