= Que Cante la Vida =

Single by Artists for Chile
- Released: March 29, 2010
- Recorded: March 2010
- Genre: Latin Pop
- Length: 3:50
- Label: EMI Music
- Songwriter: Alberto Plaza
- Producers: Jaime Ciero, Mauricio Guerrero

"Que Cante la Vida" (Let Life Sing) is a song and charity single recorded by the supergroup Artists for Chile in 2010. It is a remake of the 1985 hit song "Que Cante la Vida", which was written and performed by Alberto Plaza. The song was released on March 29, 2010, a week before another charity single for the 2010 Chile earthquake, "Gracias a la Vida" performed by various artists too including Juanes, Michael Bublé, Alejandro Sanz, Julieta Venegas, Laura Pausini among others.

== Background ==
Chilean songwriter Alberto Plaza re-record his song "Que Cante La Vida" with other Latin artists. Plaza is aware of all the details, along with another prominent Chilean singer-songwriter and producer, Jaime Ciero, who also received the support of talented Chilean Mauricio Guerrero who is donating his work to record instruments and additional vocals from Buenos Aires, Santiago and Los Angeles. He was one of the brightest minds in the industry worldwide, who has worked with artists such as Celine Dion and Phil Collins, among a long list. The project is led by EMI Music and Capitol Records with the assistance of other record companies like Warner Music, Sony Music and Universal Music, among others in conjunction with major Latin music channel HTV. The song was launched commercially in late March 2010.

=== Recording process ===
During the first weeks of March 2010, the artists recorded their contributions from different cities like Madrid, Rio de Janeiro, Mexico City, Los Angeles, Dominican Republic and Miami.

== Music video ==
On March 20, 2010, Plaza confirmed via Twitter the recording of a music video for the song.

== Artists for Chile musicians ==
Conductors

- Alberto Plaza

Soloists

- A.B. Quintanilla
- Aleks Syntek
- Alejandra Guzmán
- Alex Ubago
- Alexandre Pires
- Belinda
- Carlos Baute
- Christian Chávez
- Fausto Miño
- Fanny Lu
- Fonseca
- Franco De Vita
- Gianmarco
- Juan Fernando Velasco
- Juan Luis Guerra
- Koko Stambuk
- Kudai
- Lena Burke
- Luis Fonsi
- Marciano Cantero
- Mario Guerrero
- Noel Schajris
- Pablo Herrera
- Pee Wee
- Ricardo Montaner

== Release details ==
Region	Date	Label	Format
Chile	March 29, 2010	EMI Records	Digital download
Chile	March 29, 2010	EMI Records	Radio airplay
United States	April 6, 2010	EMI Records	Digital download
Mexico	April 6, 2010	EMI Records	Digital download
