= Deivid (footballer, born 1988) =

Brazilian footballer

Deivid Rodrigo Soares de Macedo (born June 13, 1988 in Carapicuíba) is a Brazilian former professional footballer who played as a forward.

== Teams ==
- Rio Preto 2010
- Tupã 2011
- San Marcos de Arica 2012
