= Carapicuíba =

Municipality in São Paulo, Brazil

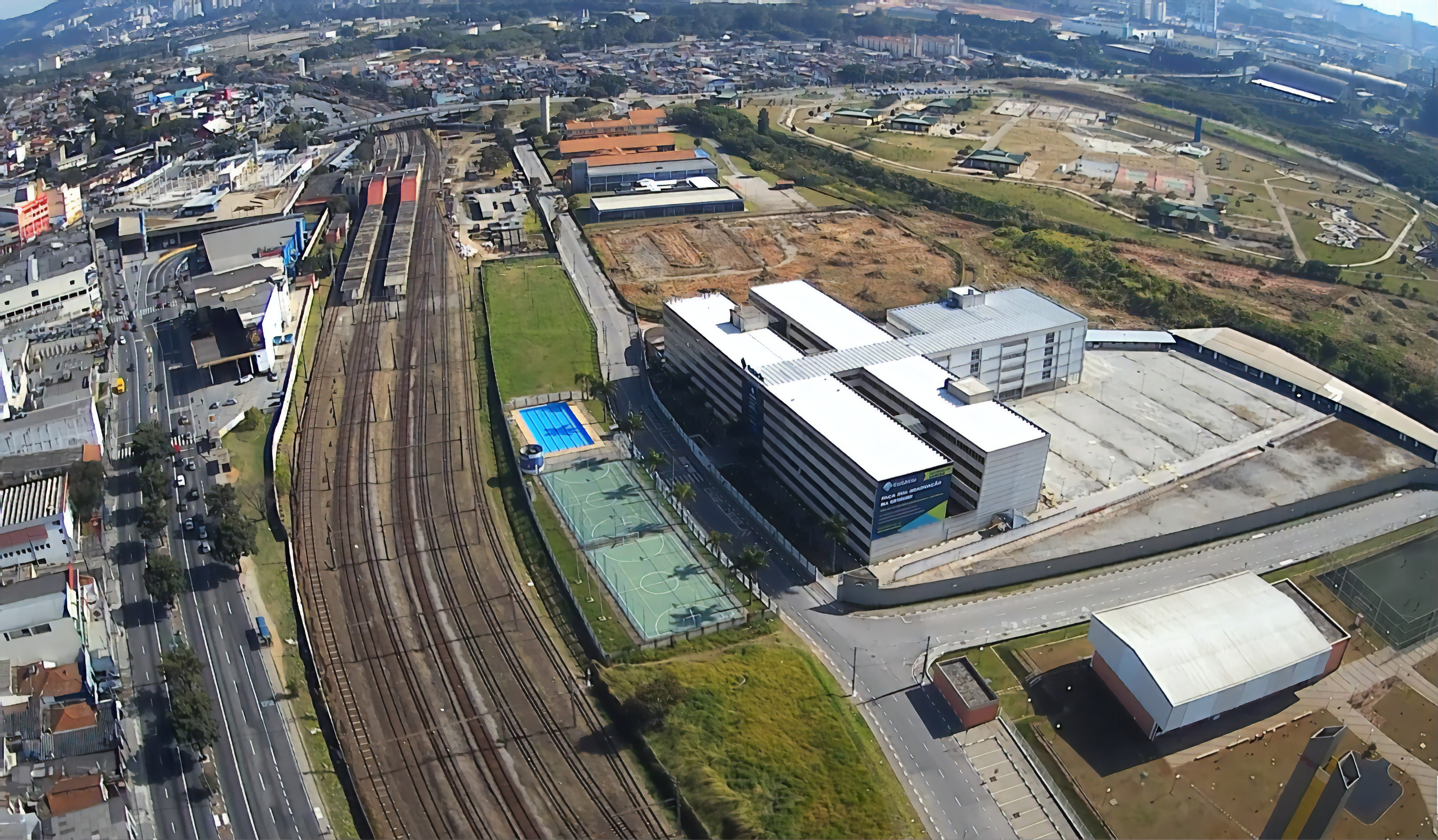
- Downtown Carapicuíba.

- Flag Coat of arms
- Nickname: Brazilian capital of selfies
- Location in the state of São Paulo and Brazil

- Location within Brazil
- Coordinates: 23°31′09″S 46°50′09″W
- Country: Brazil
- Region: Southeast
- State: São Paulo
- Metropolitan Region: São Paulo
- Settled: March 26, 1580

Government
  - Mayor: Marcos Neves (PV)

Area
  - Total: 34.55 km^{2} (13.34 sq mi)

Population (2022)
  - Total: 386,984
  - Estimate (2025): 398,236
  - Density: 11,200/km^{2} (29,010/sq mi)
- Time zone: UTC-3 (UTC-3)
  - Summer (DST): UTC-2 (UTC-2)
- HDI (2000): 0.793 – medium
- Website: Prefeitura Municipal de Carapicuíba

Carapicuíba (Portuguese pronunciation: [kaɾapikuˈibɐ]) is a municipality in the state of São Paulo in Brazil. It is part of the Metropolitan Region of São Paulo. The population is 398,236 (2025 est.) in an area of 34.55 square kilometres (13.34 sq mi). It is one of the most densely populated municipalities in the state of São Paulo.

== History ==
The region which today is Carapicuíba was inhabited by indigenous people before the arrival of European settlers. The hamlet was founded by José de Anchieta. Afonso Sardinha settled there with his farm with the will to use the indigenous people as a workforce. He then built a chapel. The indigenous people soon reacted to the European occupation, and rushed into the jungle. By the 17th century, it was part of the recently created municipality of Santana do Parnaíba. Nothing much has changed in the hamlet during this century and most of the 18th century.

From 1770 on, however, the city and its surroundings started to change noticeably, as new villages were settled, like Embu and Cotia. Houses were built around the main chapel, in which several "entrepreneur" (actually, people who arranged the parties with folklore-related themes) lived.

Until the Sorocabana Railway was implemented, in 1870, little was developed in the village. However, when a station was opened near the section of the tracks that run through the city, many people started to live in the city. During the first half of the 20th century, agriculture started to play a role in the economy of the village, because of the climate and quality of the land. A bus line starting in Barueri, running through Carapicuíba, Osasco and ending in Pinheiros was created to take people to São Paulo in alternate itineraries.

In 1948, Carapicuíba became a district of Cotia, when it became independent from São Paulo. A year later, it became part of Barueri, also as a district.

In 1952 the Parish Nossa Senhora Aparecida was built, and is now known as "Igreja Amarela" (Yellow Church), and the city population kept on increasing. The post-war times saw the vertiginous decrease of the prospecting in Minas Gerais, which led a large number of people to go to São Paulo state, a number of them settling in the city.

In the early 1960s, a movement in favor of the independence of Carapicuíba was led by the mayor of Barueri, Carlos Capriotti, and the district earned its city status in March 1965

In 2007–2008, the city gained national attention due to the Paturis Park murders.

=== Origin of the name ===
According to Professor Eduardo de Almeida Navarro, titular professor at the Faculdade de Filosofia, Letras e Ciências Humanas of University of São Paulo, the name has a controversial origin and may come from the Tupi or the Paulista General Language and may have different significations:

- "peziza (a fungus that is) inappropriate (to be eaten)" (karapuku, peziza + aíb, inappropriate + a, suffix)
- "carapicus (a fish) rotten (inappropriate to be eaten)" (akará, acará + puku, long + aíb, rotten + a, suffix)
- "carapicu tree (a kind of shrub)" (carapicu, carapicu + ' yba, tree)

Some people say that it may also come from Quar-I-Picui-Bae, name given by Indians to a small river delimiting a border between the city with Osasco and Cotia.

== Geography ==
The border with Barueri is a large plain formed by the side of the Rio Tietê. The exploration of sand in the area was so intensive that a large crater was formed. However, during the 1960s, the government of São Paulo state started a series of works to alter the route of the river, and the destruction of the wall between the river and the crater led to the flooding of it. Now, the place has become an artificial lake called "Lagoa de Carapicuíba" (Carapicuíba Lake). 8 thousand litres of sewage from the central, western and southern portions of the city of São Paulo pass through the lake towards Barueri. The average altitude is 717 meters and the climate is in general a humid subtropical climate.

== Demography ==
Historical population (municipality)
Year	Population	%±
1970	54,873	—
1980	185,822	238.6%
1991	283,661	52.7%
2000	344,596	21.5%
2010	369,584	7.3%
2022	386,984	4.7%

== Economy ==
As of 2005, the city has a GDP of R$1,915,285,000.00 and a GDP per capita of R$5,004

== Media ==
In telecommunications, the city was served by Companhia Telefônica Brasileira until 1973, when it began to be served by Telecomunicações de São Paulo. In July 1998, this company was acquired by Telefónica, which adopted the Vivo brand in 2012.

The company is currently an operator of cell phones, fixed lines, internet (fiber optics/4G) and television (satellite and cable).

== Transportation ==
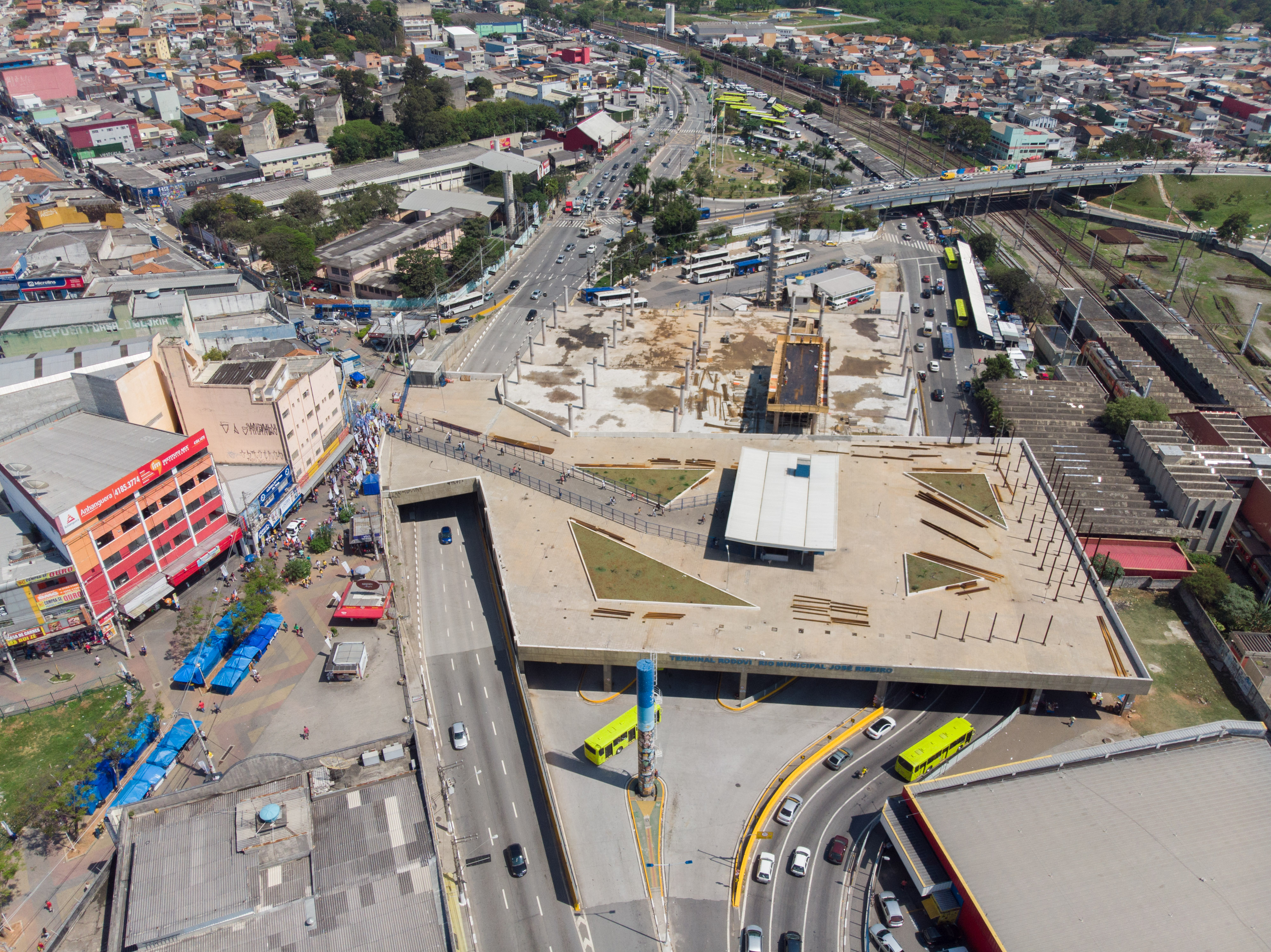
Carapicuíba Bus Terminal under construction as of October 2018.

The city is served by the Line 8 of São Paulo commuter rail, having two stations within the area of the municipality and a third one just after the border with Osasco. Three Bus services serve the city: ETT Carapicuíba and Del Rey Transportes, with municipal and inter municipal lines, and Viação Osasco, with intermunicipal lines only.

=== Highways ===
There are no highways crossing Carapicuíba, though the Rodoanel Mário Covas marks most of the border with Osasco and provides some accesses to the city, as well as serving as the main connection to the other highways and the city of São Paulo itself. The Rodovia Castelo Branco passes just north of the city, in Barueri. It is also possible to access Carapicuíba from the Rodovia Raposo Tavares, which runs just south of it in the city of Cotia, and from Osasco via the Avenida dos Autonomistas.

== Notable people ==
- Higor Alves, athlete
- Amauri, footballer
- André, footballer
- Deivid, footballer
- Dener, footballer
- Leonardo Jesus, footballer
- Gustavo Oliveira, cyclist
- Netinho de Paula, musician, television presenter, and politician

== Religion ==
Christianity is present in the city as follows:

=== Catholic Church ===
The Catholic church in the municipality is part of the Diocese of Osasco.

=== Protestant Church ===
The most diverse evangelical beliefs are present in the city, mainly Pentecostal, including the Assemblies of God in Brazil (the largest evangelical church in the country), Christian Congregation in Brazil, among others. These denominations are growing more and more throughout Brazil.

== See also ==
- List of municipalities in São Paulo
