= Do Meu Jeito =

Studio album by Kelly Key
- Released: April 10, 2003
- Recorded: 2002–2003
- Genres: Dance-pop; R&B
- Length: 45:02
- Language: Portuguese
- Label: Warner Music
- Producers: Sérgio Mama; DJ Cuca

Kelly Key chronology
Remix Hits (2002)	Do Meu Jeito (2003)	Kelly Key - Ao Vivo (2004)

Singles from Kelly Key
- 1. "Adoleta" Released: March 30, 2003; 2. "Chic, Chic" Released: July 5, 2003; 3. "A Loirinha, o Playboy e o Negão" Released: October 30, 2003

Do Meu Jeito is the second studio album by Brazilian recording artist Kelly Key, released on April 10, 2003, by Warner Music.

== Production ==
As opposed to her previous album, where most of the songs were composed by Key, the second album has only one composition of the singer, the song "Então Beija", an autobiography. The tracks on the album are composed by Andinho, Umberto Tavares, Victor and Junior by singer Gustavo Lins. The production of the album was done by DJ Cuca Afghanistan and producer, known on the Rio de Janeiro's scene, exploiting a pop sound with elements of dance-pop and R&B.

The theme explored by the tracks are mostly about love relationships, both romantic and disastrous, precisely targeted to teens. Casual sex is again one of the themes discussed by the singer in the band as I am not so easy, where Kelly sings about girls who are pressured by their boyfriends for sex. There is also the song "A Loirinha, o Playboy e o Negão", which explores the theme of racial prejudice, by a white boy to a couple formed by a blonde girl and a black boy. According to Kelly that the song is also a protest against racism, also a protest against prejudice towards homosexuals, overweight people and other forms of bias.

Do Meu Jeito received mixed from negative reviews, but most held negative criticism about the album the song was directed Adoleta, stating that Kelly would influence adolescents to quit school and just enjoy dating, friendships and parties. The singer defended herself saying that a song does not influence people to leave school, only to seize the gift of adolescence. Folha de S.Paulo called the album positive, saying that the album contains "adult themes" and is "full of messages for teenagers", adding that "The relationships are the keynote of the new CD." Brazilian journalist Zeca Camargo included the song "A Loirinha, o Playboy e o Negão" made the list and denies the journalist to the gate G1 of the 35 best songs from pop/rock national position in twenty-three, and also in the list of songs that should A Thousand songs to hear differently, also made by Camargo to G1.

The album reached number one and sold over 300,000 copies, making it one of the best-selling albums of 2003.

== Singles ==
"Adoleta", was the lead single from Do Meu Jeito, it was released on March 30, 2003. The song is considered to "Baba", when the situation is the inverse. "Adoleta" reached #1 at Hot 100 Brasil, Hit Parade Brasil.
"Chic, Chic, the second single, was released on July 5, 2003, was composed to be a Kelly's biography. The song reached #9 Hot 100 Brasil and #4 at Hit Parade Brasil
"A Loirinha, o Playboy e o Negão", the third single from Do Meu Jeito, was released on October 30, 2003. The song had a moderate success, reaching #34 . The single was included in two lists by Brazilian journalist Zeca Camargo, for the website G1.

=== Promotional singles ===
"Ciúme" was the only promotional single from Do Meu Jeito, featuring Daddy Kall. It was released on November 20, 2011, reaching #15 at Hot 100 Brasil.

== Track listing ==
No.	Title	Writer(s)	Length
1.	"Chic, Chic"	Gustavo Lins, Umberto Tavares, Andinho	3:08
2.	"Adoleta"	Lins, Tavares, Victor Junior	3:34
3.	"Ih! Fora"	Andinho	3:20
4.	"Ciúme" (featuring Daddy Kall)	Andinho, Daddy Kall, Tavares	3:07
5.	"Então Beija"	Kelly Key, Tavares	3:32
6.	"Corta Essa"	Lins, Andinho	3:04
7.	"Por Causa de Você"	Lins, Tavares, Junior	4:04
8.	"Não Sou Tão Fácil Assim"	Andinho	2:57
9.	"A Loirinha, o Playboy e o Negão"	Tavares, Andinho	2:50
10.	"Na Na Na"	Lins, Tavares, Junior	4:11
11.	"Reza Prá Eu Não Te Pegar"	Tavares, Junior, Andinho	3:08

Bonus track
No.	Title	Writer(s)	Length
12.	"Adoleta Remix TC"	Lins, Tavares, Junior	5:22

=== Certifications ===
Country	Certification	Sales/shipments
Brazil (ABPD)	Gold	300.000

== Release history ==
Region	Date	Format	Label
Brazil	April 10, 2003	CD	Warner Music
Portugal	August 27, 2003	CD	Warner Music
Chile	February 6, 2004	Digital download	Warner Music
