= Kelly Key (2008 album) =

Pra Brilhar

Studio album by Kelly Key
- Released: September 20, 2008
- Recorded: 2008
- Genre: Pop; dance-pop; pop rock
- Length: 47:20
- Language: Portuguese
- Label: Som Livre

Kelly Key chronology
100% Kelly Key (2007)	Pra Brilhar (2008)	No Controle (2015)

Singles from Kelly Key
- 1. "O Tempo Vai Passar" Released: August 20, 2008; 2. "Indecisão (Mr. Jam Remix)" Released: March 4, 2009

Pra Brilhar is the fifth studio album by Brazilian pop singer Kelly Key, released on 20 September 2008, by Som Livre.

== Track listing ==
Standard version
No.	Title	Writer(s)	Length
1.	"Parou Pra Nós Dois"	Christian Ballard, Tim Hawes, Pete Kirtley, Obi Mhondera, Andrew Murray	3:29
2.	"Mexe"	Andinho	3:34
3.	"Larguei"	Andinho, Kelly Key	3:23
4.	"O Tempo Vai Passar"	Rodrigo Batista da Cruz	3:21
5.	"Tô Fora"	Gustavo Lins	3:27
6.	"Indecisão"	Jörgen Elofson	3:43
7.	"Pega de Jeito""	Gustavo Lins	3:40
8.	"A Fila Anda"	Álvaro Socci	2:50
9.	"Quero Sair"	Gustavo Lins, Humberto Tavares	3:48
10.	"Demais"	Andinho	4:11
11.	"Você Pra Mim"	Fernanda Porto	3:38

Bonus
No.	Title	Writer(s)	Length
12.	"Você é o Cara"	Kelly Key	2:50
13.	"Super Poderosa (Mix by Dennis DJ)"	Gustavo Lins, Humberto Tavares	3:31
14.	"Quando a Noite Cai"	Andinho	3:38

Download digital
No.	Title	Writer(s)	Length
15.	"Indecisão (Mr. Jam Remix)"	Jörgen Elofson	3:35
