= Kelly Key (2005 album) =

Kelly Key 2005

Studio album by Kelly Key
- Released: May 22, 2005
- Recorded: 2004–2005
- Genre: Pop; dance pop; teen pop
- Length: 41:11
- Language: Portuguese
- Label: Warner Music
- Producer: Plínio Profeta; DJ Mãozinha

Kelly Key chronology
Kelly Key - Ao Vivo (2004)	Kelly Key 2005 (2005)	Por Que Não? (2006)

Singles from Kelly Key
- 1. "Escuta Aqui Rapaz" Released: May 12, 2005; 2. "Sou a Barbie Girl" Released: August 15, 2005; 3. "Papinho" Released: December 5, 2005

Kelly Key 2005 is the third studio album by Brazilian pop singer Kelly Key, released on May 22, 2005, by Warner Music. The album features two covers: "Barbie Girl", originally recorded in 1997 by the group Aqua, and "Trouble", originally recorded by the band Shampoo in 1995.

== Track listing ==
No.	Title	Writer(s)	Length
1.	"Papinho"	Humberto Tavares, Andinho	2:36
2.	"Bad Boy"	Kelly Key	3:40
3.	"Sou a Barbie Girl"	Claus Norreen, Søren Nystrøm Rasted	4:20
4.	"É Chamego ou Xaveco?"	Andinho	3:21
5.	"Escuta Aqui Rapaz"	Gustavo Lins, Humberto Tavares, Edu Ferreira	3:27
6.	"Eu Não Tô Brincando"	Jacqui Blake, Carrie Askew	3:43
7.	"Sou Neném"	Kelly Key, Andinho	3:40
8.	"Tô Te Dando Mole"	Gustavo Lins, Andinho	2:50
9.	"O Filme Já Vai Começar"	Andinho, Humberto Tavares	3:48
10.	"Já Não Somos Mais Livres"	Andinho, Gustavo Lins	4:11
11.	"Minha Galera"	Andinho	3:38

Bonus
No.	Title	Writer(s)	Length
12.	"Bad Boy (remix)"	Kelly Key	4:50
13.	"Escuta Aqui Rapaz (remix)"	Gustavo Lins, Humberto Tavares, Edu Ferreira	5:23
14.	"É Chamego ou Xaveco? (remix)"	Andinho	5:58

== Certifications ==
Country	Certification	Sales/shipments
Brazil (ABPD)	Gold	100.000
