= 100% Kelly Key =

Compilation album by Kelly Key
- Released: December 10, 2007
- Recorded: 2007
- Genres: Pop, dance-pop, R&B
- Length: 40:32
- Language: Portuguese
- Label: Som Livre

Kelly Key chronology
Por Que Não? (2006)	100% Kelly Key (2007)	Kelly Key (2008)

Singles from Kelly Key
- 1. "Você é o Cara" Released: November 10, 2007; 2. "Super Poderosa" Released: May 26, 2008

100% Kelly Key is a compilation album by Brazilian pop singer Kelly Key, released on December 10, 2007, by Som Livre.

== Track listing ==
Standard version
No.	Title	Writer(s)	Length
1.	"Super Poderosa"	Kelly Key, Gustavo Lins, Andinho	3:29
2.	"Barbie Girl"		3:34
3.	"Cachorrinho"	Kelly Key	3:23
4.	"Chic, Chic"	Kelly Key, Gustavo Lins, Andinho	3:21
5.	"Baba"	Kelly Key	3:27
6.	"Pegue e Puxe"	Kelly Key, Gustavo Lins, Andinho	3:43
7.	"Anjo"	Kelly Key	3:40
8.	"Você é o Cara"	Kelly Key	2:50
9.	"Adoleta"	Gustavo Lins, Andinho	3:48
10.	"Por Causa de Você"	Kelly Key, Gustavo Lins	4:11
11.	"Como Eu Quero"	Paula Toller	3:38
12.	"Quando a Noite Cai"	Andinho	2:50
13.	"Analista"	Andinho	3:31
14.	"Escondido"	Kelly Key	3:38
15.	"Papinho"	Andinho	3:38
