= Katinguelê =

Brazilian musical group

- Origin: São Paulo, Brazil
- Genres: Pagode; Romantic pagode; Samba
- Years active: 1983–2001, 2005–present
- Members: Udi; Téo; Mário; Gui
- Past members: Salgadinho; Breno; Diguinho; Juninho do Banjo

Katinguelê is a Brazilian pagode and samba group, formed in São Paulo in the first half of the 1980s. They are most well known for their romantic pagode songs as the subgenre began to explode in the 1980s and 1990s.

== History ==
The group had its beginnings in the neighborhood of Cidade Dutra, in the South Zone of São Paulo, between 1983 and 1985, during which time they played at night clubs in São Paulo. There is some debate as to the groups exact founding, as their official website points to 1983, while other sources indicate 1984 or 1985, the latter date being the year they released their first LP, "Divina Luz".

With the rise in of romantic pagode at the end of the 1980s and going into the 1990s, Katinguelê had the opportunity to begin recording professionally through the samba song “Um Doce Sabor”, which became part of the LP "Chopapo", a compilation of various artists released through an independent label of the same name in 1992. A success on local radio stations enticed the group to record, through Chopapo, their first studio album, "Bem no íntimo", which became known for its titular song, written by Salgadinho. Two years after, they released, again through Chopapo, their second LP, "Meu recado", which sold more than 100,000 records.

In 1996, through a contract signed by EastWest, a subsidiary of Warner Music, they released the album "No compasso do criador", which hit 700,000 records sold. It contained such hits as "Nosso momentos", "Ainda resta uma bagagem", "Minha felicidade", "Saudade da rainha viola", and the titular song, all samba songs written by Salgadinho, Mita, and Papacaça.

The following year, they released their fourth studio album, Mundo dos Sonhos, which sold 250,000 copies. In 1998, with the album Na Área, the group had sold 250,000 copies, reached in part through the success of "Inaraí".

The biggest name from Katinguelê, Salgadinho, left the group in 2001 to pursue a solo career. He returned to the group briefly at the end of the 2000s, but left again shortly afterwards to pursue his own artistic career.

== Discography ==
- 1992 – Bem No Íntimo
- 1994 – Meu Recado
- 1996 – No Compasso do Criador
- 1997 – Mundo dos Sonhos
- 1998 – Katinguelê Na Área
- 1999 – 15 Anos ao Vivo
- 2000 – Venha Matar Saudade
- 2005 – Show Vai Começar - Ao Vivo
- 2008 – A Volta Ao Vivo
- 2010 – Por Amor
- 2015 – Essência

== Members ==
- Udi (formerly Hoody) – pandeiro
- Téo – percussion
- Mario – hand-repique
- Gui - vocals and cavaquinho

=== Former members ===
- Salgadinho – vocals and cavaquinho
- Juninho do Banjo - vocals and banjo
- Breno – guitar and vocals
- Diguinho – vocals
