= Kelly Key =

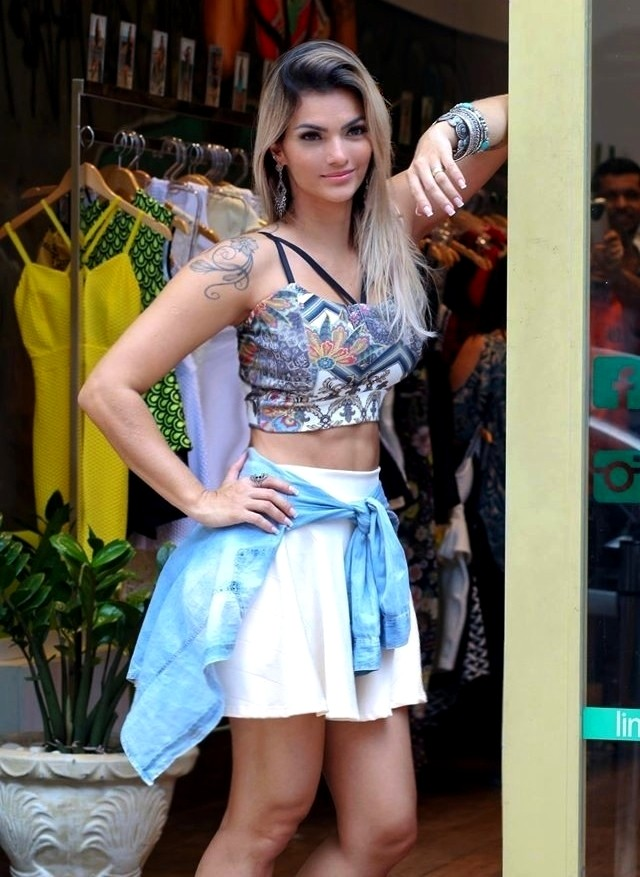
- Key at fitness event in 2015.

Background information
- Born: Kelly de Almeida Afonso Freitas; March 3, 1983 (age 43); Rio de Janeiro, Brazil
- Genres: Pop; R&B; dance-pop
- Occupations: Singer-songwriter; youtuber; television personality
- Instrument: Vocals
- Years active: 2001–present
- Labels: Warner (2001–2007; 2019–present); Som Livre (2007–2009); Sony Music (2012–2014); Deckdisc (2014–2018)
- Website: kellykey.com.br

Kelly de Almeida Afonso Freitas (born March 3, 1983), better known professionally as Kelly Key, is a Brazilian pop singer-songwriter, YouTuber, and television personality. She rose to prominence in 2001 with her singles "Baba" and "Cachorrinho" which became defining hits of the early 2000s Brazilian pop music scene. Known for her blend of pop and R&B, she quickly established herself as a pop icon in Brazil. Over the course of her career, she has sold millions of records, earned numerous awards, and helped shape the genre of Brazilian pop for a new generation. Often compared to American contemporaries like Britney Spears for her playful and provocative image, Kelly Key has remained a fixture in Brazilian popular culture.

She is also the president of Kiala FC and the only female president of a soccer club in Angola.

== Biography ==
=== 1999–2002: Career beginnings and breakthrough with debut album Kelly Key ===
Kelly Key’s career began in 1999 when she worked as host on the TV show Samba Pagode & Cia. In early 2000, she recorded a demo, which was picked up by Warner Music. Her eponymous debut album was released in 2001 to great commercial success, selling over 500,000 copies within six months of its release and earning a platinum certification. The album's themes of female empowerment and independence set it apart from previous Brazilian pop music, giving it lasting influence.

While her debut single, "Escondido," was only a minor radio hit, it generated significant buzz prompting her record label to release a follow-up single, "Baba Baby." The song became a massive hit, catapulting her to national stardom and earning comparisons to international stars like Britney Spears. Subsequent singles, "Cachorrinho" and "Anjo," continued her success, reinforcing her image as a strong, independent voice for young women.

In 2002, Kelly Key expanded her reach to Hispanic America with Kelly Key en Español, a Spanish-language version of her debut album, which helped her establish a fan base in countries like Chile and Argentina. That same year, she also released a remix album called Remix Hits and posed nude for the December 2002 issue of Brazilian Playboy.

=== 2003–2004: Do Meu Jeito and live album ===
Kelly Key began working on her sophomore album in 2002. Do Meu Jeito was released the following year. The album continued to explore familiar themes from her debut but also expanded into socially conscious issues, such as racial prejudice. Do Meu Jeito was both a commercial and critical success, selling over 300,000 copies, and producing several hit singles, including "Adoleta" and "Chic, Chic." In 2004, she released a live album.

=== 2005–2009: Kelly Key, Por Que Não? and music hiatus ===
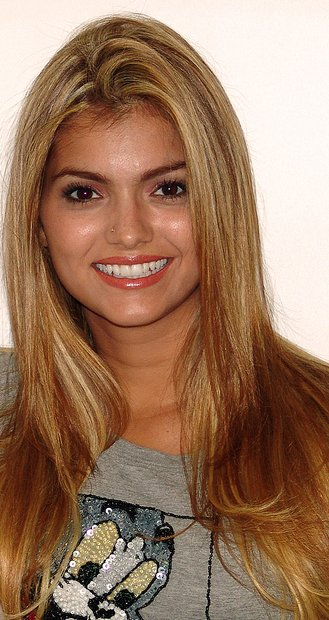
Key in 2006

In 2005, after changing the writers and producers of her first works, Key went through a transformation to her third studio album, Kelly Key 2005 which featured teen pop songs. The album featured the hits "Escuta Aqui, Rapaz" ("Listen Hear, Boy") and a remake of Aqua's 1997 hit "Barbie Girl", selling about 100,000 copies in Brazil. In 2006 she released her last album on the Warner Music label, Por Que Não? (English: Why Not?), selling 45,000 copies. The album spawned the hits "Pegue e Puxe" ("Grab and Pull"), "Shake Boom" and "Analista" ("Analyst").

In 2007 Key released her first compilation, 100% Kelly Key, by Som Livre ("Free Sound") Records, her new label, selling 50,000 copies. The album released the smash "Você é o Cara" ("You're the guy"), reaching her seventh number one single in Brazil. In 2008 Key released her fifth studio album Kelly Key, rescuing adult themes and selling 40,000 copies. In 2009, Key left Som Livre Records to become a presenter.

=== 2010–2019: Television career and No Controle ===
In 2009 she became host of the Rede Record's TV show Hoje em Dia with other presenters. In 2010, she became host of her own TV show, the Game Show de Verão. In 2011 she returned to music and released her first house music single, "O Problema é Meu" ("The Problem is Mine"), which featured DJ and producer Mister Jam. On November 15, she released her debut English single, "Shaking (Party People).

In 2014 Kelly announced return to the stage; the single "Controle" marked her return to music after five years dedicating herself exclusively to television. On February 3, 2015, the singer released her sixth studio album No Controle, which features a sound inspired by the rhythms kizomba, zouk and electronic music. In 2019, she released an EP titled Do Jeito Delas, and the following year expanded it into an album of the same name.

== Philanthropy and other activities ==
Key has a great success with the LGBT people in Brazil, and she supports same-sex marriage in the country. She was a spokesperson to high-school age young adults in a campaign in which she said, "Show how you've grown up. This Carnaval, use condoms."

Key became a friend and business partner of singer and digital influencer Clei Ribeiro and shared videos by him.

== Discography ==
- Kelly Key (2001)
- En Español (2002)
- Do Meu Jeito (2003)
- Kelly Key (2005)
- Por Que Não? (2006)
- Pra Brilhar (2008)
- No Controle (2015)
- Do Jeito Delas (2020)

== Tours ==
- 2001–2003: Turnê Kelly Key (247 concerts – In Brazil)
- 2003–2004: Turnê Ao Vivo e do Meu Jeito (118 concerts in Brazil)
- 2005: Turnê O Filme Já Começou
- 2006: Turnê Por que Não? (46 in Brazil)
- 2008–2009: 100% Tour (90 concerts in Brazil)
- 2010: Holiday Tour (7 concerts – Brazil)
- 2011–2013: In the Night/Shaking Tour (43 concerts – Brazil)
- 2015: Turnê No Controle (19 concerts – Brazil)

== Filmography ==
Television
Year	Film	Role	Notes
1999	Samba, Pagode & Cia.	Presenter	
2004	Band Kids	Presenter	
2003	Celebridade	Herself	Telenovela; 1 episode
2004	Contando Histórias com Kelly Key	Presenter	5 episodes
2005	Prova de Amor	Herself	Telenovela; 1 episode
2006	Dança dos Famosos	Celebrity contestant	Season 2
2008	Astros	Judge	Season 1, 2 episodes
2009	Hoje em Dia Especial	Presenter	2009–10
2009	Mestres do Ilusionismo	Presenter	Special TV show; 1 program
2010	Game Show de Verão	Presenter	2010–11
2012	Ídolos Kids	Herself/Judge/Mentor	2012–13
2014	Domingo Da Gente	Presenter	1 program
2015	Vai Que Cola	Herself	1 episode

Films
Year	Film	Role
2003	O Cupido Trapalhão	Herself
