= Live in Hollywood (RBD video album) =

Live album by RBD
- Released: April 4, 2006
- Recorded: January 21, 2006
- Venue: Pantages Theater, Los Angeles, California
- Genre: Pop
- Label: EMI
- Producer: Pedro Damián, Camilo Lara

RBD chronology
Tour Generación RBD En Vivo (2005)	Live in Hollywood (2006)	¿Que Hay Detrás de RBD? (2006)

Professional ratings
Review scores
Source	Rating
Allmusic	1.5/5 stars
Amazon.com	4/5 stars

Live in Hollywood is the second live concert release by Latin pop group RBD. Released on April 4, 2006 in Mexico and in the United States, the DVD includes the whole concert performed and recorded on January 21, 2006 at the Pantages Theater in Los Angeles, California, plus a backstage pass and extra footage of the band on the road on their 'Tour Generación 2006' or 'Nuestro Amor Tour'. This concert was the first the group performed in the United States, with the show itself having a visually colorful and acoustic style, even counting with the support of a gospel choir.

Despite having been recorded in the United States, the edition of the DVD released in the US does not feature the medley performance of "Rebelde", "Solo Quédate En Silencio" and "Sálvame". The performance was, however, shown on the US television network Telemundo on March 24, 2007.

In Brazil, the DVD was released on June 14, 2006 and found itself at #1 for two weeks in the country's top music DVD sales chart and sold over 100,000 copies there.

== Track listing ==
1. "Intro"
2. "Tras De Mí"
3. "Me Voy"
4. "Nuestro Amor"
5. "Así Soy Yo"
6. "Qué Fue Del Amor"
7. "A Tu Lado"
8. "No Pares"
9. "Fuera"
10. "Solo Para Ti"
11. "Este Corazón"
12. "Aún Hay Algo"
13. "Qué Hay Detrás"
14. "Medley" ("Rebelde"/"Solo Quédate En Silencio"/"Sálvame") (Only available on the Mexican and Brazilian editions of the DVD)
15. "Feliz Cumpleaños"

Bonus material

- RBD in Hollywood
- Road to the Pantages
- The Creator Pedro Damián
- Poncho Interview
- Christian Interview
- Christopher Interview
- Maite Interview
- Anahí Interview
- Dulce Interview
- Pantages Theater Backstage
- Pantages Theater Showtime
- Pantages Soundcheck
- Break Time
- Photo Gallery

== Personnel ==
Credits adapted from the DVD's liner notes.

Performance credits

- RBD – main vocals
- Carlton Anderson – choir
- Maxine Waters – choir
- Orren Waters – choir
- Tiffiney Smith – choir
- Leyla Hoyle – choir
- Nikki Grier – choir

Musicians

- Güido Laris – bass
- Mauricio Soto – drums
- Oshi Yaganagui – guitar
- Charly Rey – guitar
- Eduardo Téllez – keyboards
- Rafael Padilla – percussion

Production

- Camilo Lara – A&R, executive producer
- Melissa Mochulske – A&R coordination
- Güido Laris – arrangements, musical director
- Charly Rey – arrangements
- Eduardo Téllez – arrangements
- Mauricio Soto – arrangements
- Iván Machorro – arrangements
- Alexis Covacevich – art director
- Antonio Acevedo – associate DP
- Benny Corral – associate producer
- Luis Luisillo Miguel – associate producer, photographer (for COPRODUCE Studio)
- Marco Flavio Cruz – cinematographer
- Lynda Thomas – choir conductor
- Jaime Gutiérrez Cáceres – coordinator
- Sebastián Garza – editing
- Pedro Damián – executive producer
- Carlos Lara – director, producer
- Carolina Palomo Ramos – marketing, PR, production coordinator
- Raúl González Biestro – mixer, production
- Raúl Oropeza – mixing engineer
- Hula Hula – graphic design
- Marisol Alcelay – product manager
- Peter Kent – string quartet conductor

== Charts and certifications ==
=== Weekly and monthly charts ===
Chart	Peak Position
Argentina CAPIF – Top 20 Musical DVDs	16
Brazil ABPD – Top 25 Music DVDs	1
Spain PROMUSICAE – Top 20 Musical DVDs	1

=== Year-end charts ===
Charts	Peak Position
Brazil ABPD – Top 25 Music DVDs (2006)	1

=== Certifications and sales ===
Country and certifying agency	Certification	Sales
Brazil (ABPD)	Platinum	125,000
Mexico (AMPROFON)	Platinum + Gold	40,000
Spain (PROMUSICAE)	Platinum	60,000
	Total	200,000

== Release history ==
Region	Date	Format	Label
Mexico	April 4, 2006	DVD	EMI
United States	April 4, 2006	DVD	EMI
Brazil	June 14, 2006	DVD	EMI
Spain	December 11, 2006	DVD	EMI

== See also ==
- Live In Hollywood (album)
