= Tour Generación RBD =

2005–2007 concert tour by RBD

- Debut tour by RBD
- Promotional poster for the US leg
- Location: Europe; North America; South America
- Associated album: Rebelde; Nuestro Amor
- Start date: May 13, 2005
- End date: March 3, 2007
- Legs: 3
- No. of shows: 141
- Box office: US$30.9 million (Note: $49.35 million in 2025 dollars) (in 51 concerts)

RBD concert chronology
- Tour Generación RBD (2005–07); Tour Celestial (2007)

The Tour Generación RBD (billed as Generación RBD and Tour Brasil 2006 in Brazil) was the debut concert tour by Mexican Latin pop band RBD. The tour supported their first two studio albums, Rebelde (2004) and Nuestro Amor (2005). The 141-show tour began on May 13, 2005, in Toluca, Mexico, and concluded on March 3, 2007, in Laredo, United States. The official announcement occurred on May 1, 2005, following the commercial success of the band's debut album. Diego Boneta served as the opening act.

The setlist consisted of songs from their first two records, Rebelde and Nuestro Amor and featured covers of songs by artists such as Timbiriche, Maná, Hombres G, and Luis Miguel. The tour received a mixed reception from critics; some praised the band's infectious energy and engaging interaction with the audience, while others criticized the vocal performance of the members. It was a commercial success, grossing in total of US$30.9 million by playing in front of 637,364 audience. According to Billboard, it was the highest-grossing Latin concert tour of 2006. Additionally, it was awarded Latin Tour of the Year at the 2006 Latin Billboard Music Awards. A number of concerts were recorded and released, including the show in May 2005 at Mexico's Palacio de los Deportes; afterwards released as a live album and on DVD under the title Tour Generación RBD En Vivo. Directed by Pedro Damián, ¿Que Hay Detrás de RBD? (2006) was a documentary film chronicling the tour.

== Background and development ==
Following the premiere of the telenovela Rebelde, RBD released their debut single "Rebelde", from the studio album of the same name (2004). The record was certified diamond by the Asociación Mexicana de Productores de Fonogramas y Videogramas (AMPROFON) with 500,000 copies sold. Also in 2004, producer Pedro Damián announced that there were plans for a concert tour. During a press conference on May 1, 2005, he officially announced the Tour Generación RBD. The first twelve dates of the tour were confirmed, with more concerts to be added. In the second half of 2005, RBD performed in such countries as Colombia, Venezuela, Guatemala, El Salvador, and Ecuador. The set list of the shows was composed mainly of songs from the two studio albums, Rebelde and Nuestro Amor, as well as other songs by Latin artists.

In 2006, the Tour Generación RBD continued in the United States, with the band initially performing in 30 US cities. On the RBD website, nine concerts in Brazil were scheduled, followed by three more confirmed dates (Curitiba, Salvador and Goiânia). The organization of the tour was the responsibility of the companies Mondo Entretenimento and Roptus, with support from the record label EMI Music. The organizers were notified of the fact that they had not licensed their copyrights at the Central Collection and Distribution (ECAD), and were charged approximately one million reais for eight of the band's performances in Brazil. There were a total of thirteen concerts in the country, with Diego Boneta as the opening act. In 2007, the tour continued with four concerts in Chile, concluding on March 3 in Laredo, Texas.

== Commercial reception ==
As soon as the tour was announced, tickets were sold out in Mexico, and was attended by 150,000 people in the country. According to People en Español, it was the second highest-grossing Latin tour in the first half of 2006. The single show at the Los Angeles Memorial Coliseum attracted 63,101 people, standing as one of the most attended Latin concerts in the venue's history. After finishing, Tour Generación RBD became the highest-grossing international tour in Brazil. However, it did not come up to expectations of the organizers who wanted to sell 450,000 tickets and earn over R$65 million. In 2006, Billboard reported that Generación RBD had grossed over $30.9 million ($49.35 in 2025 dollars) from 51 shows and attracted 637,364 people, becoming the highest-grossing Latin concert tour of the year. At the end of 2006, the tour was placed at number 35 on Pollstar's "Year End Top 100" list, grossing 23.6 million from 37 shows with a total audience of 749,485.

== Set list ==
This set list represents concerts realized between 2005 and 2006. It does not represent all dates throughout the tour.

2005
1. "Rebelde"
2. "Otro Día Que Va"
3. "Santa No Soy"
4. Medley 1: "Me He Enamorado De Un Fan" / "No Sé Si Es Amor" / "Ámame Hasta Con Los Dientes" / "Rayo Rebelde" / "Baile Del Sapo" / "Me Vale"
5. "Enséñame"
6. "Futuro Ex-Novio"
7. "Cuando El Amor Se Acaba"
8. "Liso, Sensual"
9. "A Rabiar"
10. "Una Canción"
11. Medley 2: "Cuando Baja La Marea" / "Te Quiero" / "Verano Peligroso" / "Devuélveme a mi chica" / "La Chica Del Bikini Azul" / "Viviendo De Noche" / "De Música Ligera" / "Es Mejor Así"
12. "Fuego"
13. "Sálvame"
14. "Tenerte y Quererte"
15. "Un Poco de Tu Amor"
16. "Solo Quédate En Silencio"

Encore

17. "Rebelde" (cumbia version)
2006–07
1. "Rebelde"
2. "Santa No Soy"
3. "Así Soy Yo"
4. "Feliz Cumpleaños"
5. "Enséñame"
6. "Qué Fue del Amor"
7. "Cuando El Amor Se Acaba"
8. "Una Canción"
9. "Este Corazón"
10. "Solo para Tí"
11. "Me Voy"
12. "Sálvame"
13. "Tenerte y Quererte"
14. "No Pares"
15. "A Tu Lado"
16. "Fuera"
17. "Solo Quédate En Silencio"
18. "Qué Hay Detrás"
19. "Un Poco de Tu Amor"
20. "Aún Hay Algo"
21. "Tras de Mí"

Encore

22. "Ser o Parecer"
23. "Nuestro Amor"
24. "Rebelde" (rock version)

=== Notes ===
- A Portuguese rock version of "Rebelde" was sung during the shows in Brazil.
- "Ser o Parecer" was added to the set list during the concert in São Paulo.

== Shows ==
List of 2005 shows
Date (2005)	City	Country	Venue	Opening act	Attendance (Tickets sold / available)	Revenue
May 13	Toluca	Mexico	Estadio Toluca 80	—N/a	—N/a	—N/a
May 14	San Luis Potosí	Mexico	Estadio 20 de Noviembre	—N/a	—N/a	—N/a
May 15	Aguascalientes	Mexico	Plaza de Toros Monumental	—N/a	—N/a	—N/a
May 20	León	Mexico	Poliforum	—N/a	—N/a	—N/a
May 21	Guadalajara	Mexico	Plaza Nuevo Progreso	—N/a	—N/a	—N/a
May 22	Querétaro	Mexico	Estadio Corregidora	—N/a	—N/a	—N/a
May 26	Mexico City	Mexico	Palacio de los Deportes	—N/a	—N/a	—N/a
May 28	Mexico City	Mexico	Palacio de los Deportes	—N/a	—N/a	—N/a
May 29	Mexico City	Mexico	Palacio de los Deportes	—N/a	—N/a	—N/a
June 3	Puebla	Mexico	Universidad de las Américas Puebla	—N/a	—N/a	—N/a
June 4	Veracruz	Mexico	Estadio Universitario Beto Ávila	—N/a	—N/a	—N/a
June 5	Villahermosa	Mexico	Parque Tabasco	—N/a	—N/a	—N/a
June 10	Torreón	Mexico	Estadio Revolución	—N/a	—N/a	—N/a
June 11	Monterrey	Mexico	Auditorio Coca-Cola	—N/a	—N/a	—N/a
June 12	Monterrey	Mexico	Auditorio Coca-Cola	—N/a	—N/a	—N/a
June 17	Mexico City	Mexico	Palacio de los Deportes	—N/a	—N/a	—N/a
June 18	Mexico City	Mexico	Palacio de los Deportes	—N/a	—N/a	—N/a
June 19	Mexico City	Mexico	Palacio de los Deportes	—N/a	—N/a	—N/a
June 24	Hermosillo	Mexico	Estadio Héroe de Nacozari	—N/a	—N/a	—N/a
June 26	Culiacán	Mexico	Estadio Banorte	—N/a	—N/a	—N/a
July 15	Tijuana	Mexico	Plaza Monumental de Tijuana	—N/a	—N/a	—N/a
July 16	Mexicali	Mexico	Estadio Nido de los Águilas	—N/a	—N/a	—N/a
July 22	Pachuca de Soto	Mexico	Parque Hidalgo	—N/a	—N/a	—N/a
July 23	Morelia	Mexico	Estadio Venustiano Carranza	—N/a	—N/a	—N/a
July 24	Zacatecas	Mexico	Estadio Francisco Villa	—N/a	—N/a	—N/a
July 29	Ciudad Juárez	Mexico	Plaza de Toros Alberto Balderas	—N/a	—N/a	—N/a
July 30	Chihuahua City	Mexico	Plaza de Toros La Esperanza	—N/a	—N/a	—N/a
August 5	Saltillo	Mexico	Auditorio del Parque Las Maravillas	—N/a	—N/a	—N/a
August 6	Monterrey	Mexico	Auditorio Coca-Cola	—N/a	—N/a	—N/a
August 7	Matamoros	Mexico	Parque Olímpico Cultural	—N/a	—N/a	—N/a
August 19	Durango	Mexico	Estadio Francisco Zarco	—N/a	—N/a	—N/a
August 21	Tepic	Mexico	Arena Cora	—N/a	—N/a	—N/a
August 25	Mexico City	Mexico	Auditorio Nacional	—N/a	—N/a	—N/a
August 26	Mexico City	Mexico	Auditorio Nacional	—N/a	—N/a	—N/a
August 28	Mexico City	Mexico	Auditorio Nacional	—N/a	—N/a	—N/a
September 3	Acapulco	Mexico	Rockola	—N/a	—N/a	—N/a
September 4	Mexico City	Mexico	Teatro Metropólitan	—N/a	—N/a	—N/a
September 30	Campeche	Mexico	Estadio Nelson Barrera	—N/a	—N/a	—N/a
October 1	Mérida	Mexico	Estadio Carlos Iturralde	—N/a	—N/a	—N/a
October 2	Cancún	Mexico	Estadio de Béisbol Beto Ávila	—N/a	—N/a	—N/a
October 7	Ciudad Juárez	Mexico	Plaza de Toros Alberto Balderas	—N/a	—N/a	—N/a
October 8	Reynosa	Mexico	Estadio Adolfo López Mateos	—N/a	—N/a	—N/a
October 9	Tijuana	Mexico	Plaza Monumental de Tijuana	—N/a	—N/a	—N/a
October 21	Medellín	Colombia	Estadio Atanasio Girardot	—N/a	—N/a	—N/a
October 22	Cali	Colombia	Estadio Olímpico Pascual Guerrero	—N/a	—N/a	—N/a
October 23	Bogotá	Colombia	Estadio El Campín	—N/a	—N/a	—N/a
October 28	Nuevo Laredo	Mexico	Parque la Junta	—N/a	—N/a	—N/a
October 29	Reynosa	Mexico	Estadio Adolfo López Mateos	—N/a	—N/a	—N/a
October 30	Tampico	Mexico	Centro de Convenciones de Tampico	—N/a	—N/a	—N/a
November 4	Colima	Mexico	Estadio Olímpico Universitario de Colima	—N/a	—N/a	—N/a
November 5	Guadalajara	Mexico	Plaza Nuevo Progreso	—N/a	—N/a	—N/a
November 6	Mazatlán	Mexico	Estadio Teodoro Mariscal	—N/a	—N/a	—N/a
November 10	Mexico City	Mexico	Auditorio Nacional	—N/a	—N/a	—N/a
November 11	Mexico City	Mexico	Auditorio Nacional	—N/a	—N/a	—N/a
November 13	Mexico City	Mexico	Auditorio Nacional	—N/a	—N/a	—N/a
November 18	Mexico City	Mexico	Auditorio Nacional	—N/a	—N/a	—N/a
November 26	Valencia	Venezuela	Forum de Valencia	—N/a	—N/a	—N/a
November 27	Caracas	Venezuela	Poliedro de Caracas	—N/a	—N/a	—N/a
December 2	San Juan	Puerto Rico	José Miguel Agrelot Coliseum	—N/a	38,921 / 40,177	$2,722,193
December 4	San Juan	Puerto Rico	José Miguel Agrelot Coliseum	—N/a	38,921 / 40,177	$2,722,193
December 9	Guatemala City	Guatemala	Estadio del Ejército	—N/a	—N/a	—N/a
December 10	San Salvador	El Salvador	Estadio Jorge "Mágico" González	—N/a	—N/a	—N/a
December 16	Cuenca	Ecuador	Estadio Alejandro Serrano Aguilar	—N/a	—N/a	—N/a
December 17	Quito	Ecuador	Coliseo General Rumiñahui	—N/a	—N/a	—N/a
December 18	Guayaquil	Ecuador	Estadio Modelo Alberto Spencer	—N/a	—N/a	—N/a

List of 2006 shows
Date (2006)	City	Country	Venue	Opening act	Attendance (Tickets sold / available)	Revenue
January 21	Los Angeles	United States	Pantages Theatre	—N/a	—N/a	—N/a
January 27	Chetumal	Mexico	Estadio de Béisbol Nachan Ka'an	—N/a	—N/a	—N/a
January 28	Ciudad del Carmen	Mexico	Domo del Mar	—N/a	—N/a	—N/a
January 29	Cancún	Mexico	Estadio de Béisbol Beto Ávila	—N/a	—N/a	—N/a
February 25	Monterrey	Mexico	Arena Monterrey	—N/a	—N/a	—N/a
March 5	Tampico	Mexico	Centro de Convenciones de Tampico	—N/a	—N/a	—N/a
March 11	San José	Costa Rica	Estadio Ricardo Saprissa Aymá	—N/a	—N/a	—N/a
March 12	Panama City	Panama	Figali Convention Center	—N/a	—N/a	—N/a
March 18	Los Angeles	United States	Los Angeles Memorial Coliseum	—N/a	63,007 / 70,000	$3,165,150
March 19	Sacramento	United States	ARCO Arena	—N/a	9,394 / 10,639	$576,770
March 24	Fresno	United States	Save Mart Center	—N/a	9,147 / 10,854	$625,471
March 25	San Diego	United States	Coors Amphitheatre	—N/a	8,338 / 10,000	$565,990
March 26	San Jose	United States	HP Pavilion	—N/a	13,401 / 13,401	$838,735
April 1	Orizaba	Mexico	Plaza de Toros La Concordia	—N/a	—N/a	—N/a
April 2	Irapuato	Mexico	Inforum	—N/a	—N/a	—N/a
April 7	El Paso	United States	El Paso Coliseum	—N/a	6,722 / 6,722	$496,470
April 8	Laredo	United States	Laredo Entertainment Center	—N/a	9,089 / 9,447	$565,821
April 9	Hidalgo	United States	Dodge Arena	—N/a	11,537 / 12,532	$851,970
April 15	Salt Lake City	United States	E Center	—N/a	3,137 / 8,046	$223,675
April 16	Denver	United States	Pepsi Center	—N/a	6,891 / 12,476	$463,155
April 28	San Antonio	United States	AT&T Center	—N/a	7,670 / 13,432	$518,590
April 29	Frisco	United States	Pizza Hut Park	—N/a	12,590 / 24,633	$806,762
April 30	The Woodlands	United States	Cynthia Woods Pavilion	—N/a	10,233 / 15,658	$684,610
May 5	Portland	United States	Rose Garden	—N/a	4,311 / 5,345	$264,205
May 6	Yakima	United States	Yakima SunDome	—N/a	2,327 / 3,097	$122,425
May 7	Tacoma	United States	Tacoma Dome	—N/a	3,028 / 9,565	$224,810
May 19	Rosemont	United States	Allstate Arena	—N/a	24,483 / 26,590	$1,758,769
May 20	Rosemont	United States	Allstate Arena	—N/a	24,483 / 26,590	$1,758,769
May 26	Fairfax	United States	Patriot Center	—N/a	4,320 / 5,200	$362,420
May 27	Charlotte	United States	Cricket Arena	—N/a	4,250 / 4,700	$317,925
May 28	Atlanta	United States	HiFi Buys Amphitheatre	—N/a	3,977 / 4,630	$337,822
June 17	Phoenix	United States	US Airways Center	—N/a	11,846 / 11,846	$793,000
June 18	Salinas	United States	Salinas Sports Complex	—N/a	—N/a	—N/a
June 22	San Francisco	United States	Bill Graham Center	—N/a	—N/a	—N/a
June 24	Indian Wells	United States	Indian Wells Tennis Garden	—N/a	6,417 / 6,500	$467,097
June 25	Las Vegas	United States	Thomas & Mack Center	—N/a	7,537 / 8,000	$443,415
June 30	Orlando	United States	TD Waterhouse Centre	—N/a	—N/a	—N/a
July 1	Miami	United States	American Airlines Arena	—N/a	7,793 / 8,000	$526,195
July 14	Uniondale	United States	Nassau Veterans Memorial Coliseum	—N/a	—N/a	—N/a
July 15	New York City	United States	Madison Square Garden	—N/a	13,098 / 13,098	$983,634
July 28	Bakersfield	United States	Mechanics Bank Arena	—N/a	—N/a	—N/a
July 30	Tucson	United States	Tucson Convention Center	—N/a	—N/a	—N/a
August 25	Santo Domingo	Dominican Republic	Félix Sánchez Olympic Stadium	—N/a	—N/a	—N/a
August 27 (Note: Two concerts on the same date.)	San Juan	Puerto Rico	José Miguel Agrelot Coliseum	—N/a	—N/a	—N/a
September 15	Maracaibo	Venezuela	Estadio Luis Aparicio El Grande	—N/a	8,305 / 10,000	$495,566
September 16	Valencia	Venezuela	Plaza de Toros Monumental de Valencia	—N/a	—N/a	—N/a
September 17	Caracas	Venezuela	Olympic Stadium	—N/a	18,377 / 18,500	$809,893
September 20	Manaus	Brazil	Sambódromo	—N/a	—N/a	—N/a
September 21	Belém	Brazil	Arena Yamada	Diego Boneta	17,015 / 18,000	$563,260
September 22	Fortaleza	Brazil	Marina Park Hotel	Diego Boneta	20,595 / 21,000	$461,221
September 23	Goiânia	Brazil	Estádio Serra Dourada	Diego Boneta	—N/a	—N/a
September 24	Brasília	Brazil	Estádio Mané Garrincha	Diego Boneta	20,097 / 20,097	$790,285
September 27	Recife	Brazil	Chevrolet Hall	Diego Boneta	—N/a	—N/a
September 29	Vitória	Brazil	Praça do Papa	Diego Boneta	—N/a	—N/a
September 30	Belo Horizonte	Brazil	Mineirinho	Diego Boneta	23,622 / 24,000	$611,887
October 3	Porto Alegre	Brazil	Gigantinho	Diego Boneta	22,107 / 24,336	$839,059
October 4	Porto Alegre	Brazil	Gigantinho	Diego Boneta	22,107 / 24,336	$839,059
October 5	Curitiba	Brazil	Kyocera Arena	Diego Boneta	23,065 / 23,065	$643,249
October 7	São Paulo	Brazil	Estádio do Morumbi	Diego Boneta	49,655 / 50,000	$1,670,553
October 8	Rio de Janeiro	Brazil	Maracanã Stadium	Diego Boneta	44,911 / 44,911	$1,270,957
October 30	Houston	United States	Toyota Center	—N/a	—N/a	—N/a
November 3	Santiago	Chile	Estadio Nacional Julio Martínez Prádanos	—N/a	40,191 / 40,191	$1,295,005
November 5	Santiago	Chile	Arena Santiago	—N/a	—N/a	—N/a
November 8	Lima	Peru	Estadio Monumental	—N/a	—N/a	—N/a

List of 2007 shows
Date (2007)	City	Country	Venue	Opening act	Attendance (Tickets sold / available)	Revenue
January 6	Barcelona	Spain	Palau Sant Jordi	—N/a	14,189 / 14,189	$915,007
January 7	Madrid	Spain	Palacio de los Deportes	—N/a	14,734 / 14,734	$917,329
February 2	El Paso	United States	Don Haskins Center	Diego Boneta	5,961 / 5,961	$348,749
February 3	Los Angeles	United States	Gibson Amphitheatre	Diego Boneta	6,009 / 6,009	$532,115
February 4	Las Vegas	United States	Aladdin Theatre	—N/a	—N/a	—N/a
February 15	Iquique	Chile	Estadio Tierra de Campeones	Diego Boneta	—N/a	—N/a
February 16	Coquimbo	Chile	Estadio Municipal Francisco Sánchez Rumoroso	Diego Boneta	—N/a	—N/a
February 17	Concepción	Chile	Estadio Municipal de Concepción	Diego Boneta	—N/a	—N/a
February 18	Viña del Mar	Chile	Estadio Sausalito	Diego Boneta	—N/a	—N/a
March 2	Hidalgo	United States	Dodge Arena	—N/a	5,168 / 5,300	$355,360
March 3	Laredo	United States	Laredo Entertainment Center	—N/a	6,137 / 6,200	$353,565
Total					666,116 / 768,657	$30,906,173 (Note: From 51 concerts reported, according to Billboard.)

=== Cancelled dates ===
List of cancelled concerts
Date (2006)	City	Country	Venue	Reason
September 30	Salvador	Brazil	Estádio Fonte Nova	Logistics issues

== Personnel ==
Credits and personnel adapted from Tour Generación RBD En Vivo and Live in Rio video liner notes.

=== Band ===
- Alfonso Herrera – vocals
- Anahí – vocals
- Charly Rey – electric guitar, guitar
- Christian Chávez – vocals
- Christopher Uckermann – vocals
- Dulce María – vocals
- Eduardo Tellez – keyboards
- Gonzalo Velásquez – acoustic guitar, electric guitar
- Güido Laris – musical director, bass, guitar, additional vocals
- Luis Emilio Arreaza "Catire" – drums, percussion
- Maite Perroni – vocals
- Martini Schram – electric guitar
- Mauricio Soto "Bicho" – drums, percussion

=== Crew ===
- Alejandro Mayen – pyrotechnician
- Bejamin López – video director
- Carolina Palomo Ramos – marketing coordinator
- Christian Rodriguez – video director
- Dante Gudiño – road manager
- David Rios – stage manager
- Fabiola Liera – choreography
- Gerardo Garcia – stage manager
- Jeronimo Ramirez – lighting director
- Juan Manuel Puerto – personal manager
- Luis Enrique Estrada – pyrotechnician, set design
- Ricardo Marquez – personal manager
- Roberto Cardozo – sound coordinator
- Salvador López – stage manager
- Sergio Mateos – production manager
- William John Murphy – make-up, styling

== See also ==
- List of highest-grossing concert tours by Latin artists
