= Tras De Mí =

2006 single by RBD

Single by RBD

from the album Nuestro Amor
- Language: Spanish
- English title: "Behind Me"
- Released: 23 January 2006
- Genre: Latin pop; pop rock; electronica; teen pop
- Length: 3:11
- Label: EMI
- Songwriters: Carlos Lara; Max di Carlo; Pedro Damián
- Producers: Lara; di Carlo

RBD singles chronology
"Aún hay algo" (2005)	"Tras De Mí" (2006)	"Este corazón" (2006)

"Tras De Mí" is a song by Mexican pop group RBD, recorded for their second studio album, Nuestro Amor (2005). The song was written by Carlos Lara, Max di Carlo and Pedro Damián, and was released as the album's third single on 23 January 2006.

The group performed the song extensively during the 2000s, and it was chosen to open the shows of their Soy Rebelde Tour in 2023.

== Background and release ==
RBD, composed of Anahí, Dulce María, Maite Perroni, Alfonso Herrera, Christopher von Uckermann, and Christian Chávez, released its second studio album Nuestro Amor on 22 September 2005, which doubled as the soundtrack to the second and third seasons of their originating telenovela Rebelde, produced by Pedro Damián.

"Tras De Mí" was released as the album's third single on 23 January 2006. A Portuguese version, entitled "Atrás de Mim", was recorded and released on the album Nosso Amor Rebelde (2006), the Brazilian version of Nuestro Amor. It was released as the third single on 4 September for the Brazilian market.

== Composition and lyrics ==
"Tras De Mí" was written by Pedro Damián and its producers Carlos Lara and Max di Carlo. It features the voices of Mexicans singer-songwriters Lynda Thomas and Guido Laris on backing vocals. Thomas provides a harmony for Dulce, and her voice is prominent on the pre-chorus and chorus, similar to the group's Spanish and English albums. Lasting three minutes and eleven seconds, it is a latin pop and pop rock song with electronica influences, and lyrics derivate of teen pop. Its structure is in the verse-pre-chorus-chorus-post-chorus form, with an instrumental bridge. It is written in the key of C minor with a tempo of 115 BPMs.

Anahí opens the first verse, stating she has a "one-way ticket" and "lots of dreams in a suitcase". She is followed by Dulce, who bids farewell to her parents and reveals she has fear but also a "desire to be able to live". The pre-chorus finds Maite wanting to "spread [her] wings to find freedom" far from her home. In the chorus, the group list things they are "leaving behind" them, including school, friends, photos of their first love, and memories in their bedroom[s]. The post-chorus is sung by Anahí, who echoes the "tras de mí" ("behind me") line. The second verse is performed by Alfonso and Christian. The former reveals sadness with "[there's] a lump in my throat" while also having "a map that takes [him] to another country". The latter says he has an "attempt [to write] a letter", while also having "a story and a desire to be able to live", just as Dulce previously stated. The pre-chorus, chorus and post-chorus are repeated, and are followed by a short instrumental bridge. The chorus then repeats two times, before an outro of only its first line sung by Thomas and Laris closes the song.

In their ranking of RBD's best songs, Uproxx writer Lucas Villa called it the group's "most hypnotic track" with an "electronica and rock-infused makeover". He described the song as the group "trad[ing] verses about leaving the past behind in search of a better future", and placed it at number 11. Mariana Canhisares of Omelete said that "growing is the theme" of "Tras de Mí", and that it has "something nostalgic". She said the track speaks of "taking risks despite the fear, all in name of your dreams". Writing for Remezcla on their "15 Favorite RBD Songs" list, Ana Clara Ribeiro said the lyrical theme is "about leaving childhood memories behind" and placed the song at number three. Writing for the same publication, Alan López called it "electronica-driven" and "a goodbye to comfort zones".

== Formats and duration ==
- Digital download / streaming
1. "Tras de Mí" – 3:11
- Digital download / streaming – Portuguese version
1. "Atrás de Mim" – 3:11

== Covers ==
On 19 August 2022, Mexican rock band Moderatto released a cover of the song with Colombiar singer Pitizion. It appears on the album Rockea Bien Duro, made by the rock group in tribute of RBD.

== Credits ==
- Alfonso Herrera – vocals
- Anahí – vocals
- Carlos Lara – songwriter, production
- Cláudio Rabello – song adaptation to Portuguese
- Christian Chávez – vocals
- Christopher von Uckermann – vocals
- Dulce María – vocals
- Guido Laris – harmony, pre-chorus/chorus vocals
- Lynda Thomas – harmony, pre-chorus/chorus vocals
- Maite Perroni – vocals
- Max di Carlo (Note: Originally credited as Karen Sokoloff) – songwriter, production
- Pedro Damián – songwriter
