= Nosso Amor Rebelde =

2006 RBD album

Studio album (reissue) by RBD
- Released: May 22, 2006 (Brazil)
- Recorded: 2006
- Studio: Televisa
- Genre: Pop rock
- Length: 48:32
- Language: Portuguese • Spanish
- Label: EMI, SBT Music
- Producer: Armando Ávila, Carlos Lara, Max di Carlo, Pedro Damián

RBD chronology
Live in Hollywood (2006)	Nosso Amor Rebelde (2006)	Celestial (2006)

Singles from Nosso Amor Rebelde
- 1. "Nosso Amor" Released: May 22, 2006; 2. "Venha de Novo O Amor" Released: June 23, 2006

Professional ratings
Review scores
Source	Rating
Allmusic	3/5 stars

Nosso Amor Rebelde (English: Our Rebel Love) is the second Portuguese language studio album by Mexican pop group RBD, released only in Brazil on May 22, 2006. The album contains 11 songs translated to Portuguese from RBD's successful second Spanish studio album, Nuestro Amor.

== Background ==
With the success of the first two seasons of the telenovela Rebelde (broadcast through SBT in Brazil between 2005 and 2006) and the good sales of RBD's albums in Brazil (mainly those of Rebelde (Edição Brasil), the Portuguese language version of the group's first studio album), RBD's production team decided to start producing a Brazilian version of the album Nuestro Amor to support the broadcast of the third season of the telenovela (starring the group) in the country.

== Recording and production ==
All of the members of RBD took turns between recording the album in the recording studio and filming the telenovela Rebelde. The first songs to be recorded were "Nosso Amor" and "Venha de Novo O Amor", so as to be used as part of the telenovela's soundtrack, which was being broadcast by SBT.

The album's production was entirely supervised by the band's executive producer: Pedro Damián. The original Spanish lyrics in Nuestro Amor were translated and adapted to Portuguese by Cláudio Rabello.

== Promo singles ==
Four singles were released in Brazil to promote the album. The first was the album's title track, "Nosso Amor". The second single, released in July 2006, was "Venha de Novo O Amor", while the third single, "Atrás de Mim", was released in September 2006. The album's last single was released in October 2006 and was titled "Esse Coração".

== Release ==
The album was released on May 22, 2006, and has sold 750,000 copies in Brazil.

== Track listing ==
Nosso Amor Rebelde
No.	Title	Writer(s)	Length
1.	"Nosso Amor"	Memo Méndez Guiú; Emil "Billy" Méndez; Cláudio Rabello	3:34
2.	"Feliz Aniversário"	Jade Ell; Mats Hedström; Rabello	2:58
3.	"Esse Coração"	Armando Ávila; Rabello	3:27
4.	"Venha de Novo O Amor"	Carlos Lara; Karen Sokoloff; Rabello	3:34
5.	"Ao Seu Lado"	Lara; Rabello	3:46
6.	"Fora"	Mauricio L. Arriaga; Rabello	3:36
7.	"O Que Houve Com O Amor?"	Ávila; Rabello	3:44
8.	"O Que Há Por Trás?"	Lara, Sokoloff; Rabello	3:17
9.	"Atrás de Mim"	Lara; Sokoloff; Pedro Damián; Rabello	3:11
10.	"Só Para Você"	Mario Sandoval; Rabello	3:43
11.	"Uma Canção"	José Roberto Matera; CJ Turbay Daccarett; Rabello	3:37
12.	"Me Voy"	Kara DioGuardi; Mauri Stern	3:25
13.	"Así Soy Yo"	Fernando Rojo	3:08
14.	"Nuestro Amor" (Music video)		3:32
Total length:			48:32

Notes

- "Feliz Aniversário" is a cover of Mikeyla's "Happy Worst Day".
- "Me Voy" is a Spanish cover of Kelly Clarkson's "Gone", originally released on her second studio album Breakaway (2004).

== Translated songs ==
The tracks that were translated and recorded in Portuguese from their original Spanish language versions in Nuestro Amor (2005) are:

- "Nosso Amor" ("Nuestro Amor")
- "Feliz Aniversário" ("Feliz Cumpleaños")
- "Esse Coração" ("Este Corazón")
- "Venha de Novo O Amor" ("Aún Hay Algo")
- "Ao Seu Lado" ("A Tu Lado")
- "Fora" ("Fuera")
- "O Que Houve Com O Amor?" ("¿Qué Fue Del Amor?")
- "O Que Há Por Trás?" ("¿Qué Hay Detrás?")
- "Atrás de Mim" ("Tras De Mí")
- "Só Para Você" ("Solo Para Ti")
- "Uma Canção" ("Una Canción")

== Charts and certifications ==
The album was certified 2× Platinum in Brazil. It was the 14th best-selling album of 2006 in Brazil according to the ABPD.

=== Weekly charts ===
Chart	Peak position
Brazilian Albums Chart	22

=== Year-end charts ===
Chart (2006)	Peak position
Brazilian Albums Chart	14

=== Certifications and sales ===
Region	Certification	Certified units/sales
Brazil (Pro-Música Brasil)	2× Platinum	120,000^{*}
^{*} Sales figures based on certification alone.

== Release history ==
Region	Date	Format	Label
Brazil	May 22, 2006	CD, digital download	EMI, SBT Music
