= Tour Generación RBD en Vivo (video) =

Tour Generación RBD En Vivo

Live album by RBD
- Released: 26 August 2005
- Recorded: 27 May 2005
- Venue: Palacio de los Deportes, Mexico City, Mexico
- Genre: Latin pop; Pop rock
- Label: EMI
- Director: Pedro Damián; Armando Ávila; Raúl González Biestro; Camilo Lara

RBD chronology
Rebelde (2004)	Tour Generación RBD En Vivo (2005)	Live in Hollywood (2006)

Professional ratings
Review scores
Source	Rating
Amazon.com	4.5/5 stars
Allmusic	2/5 stars

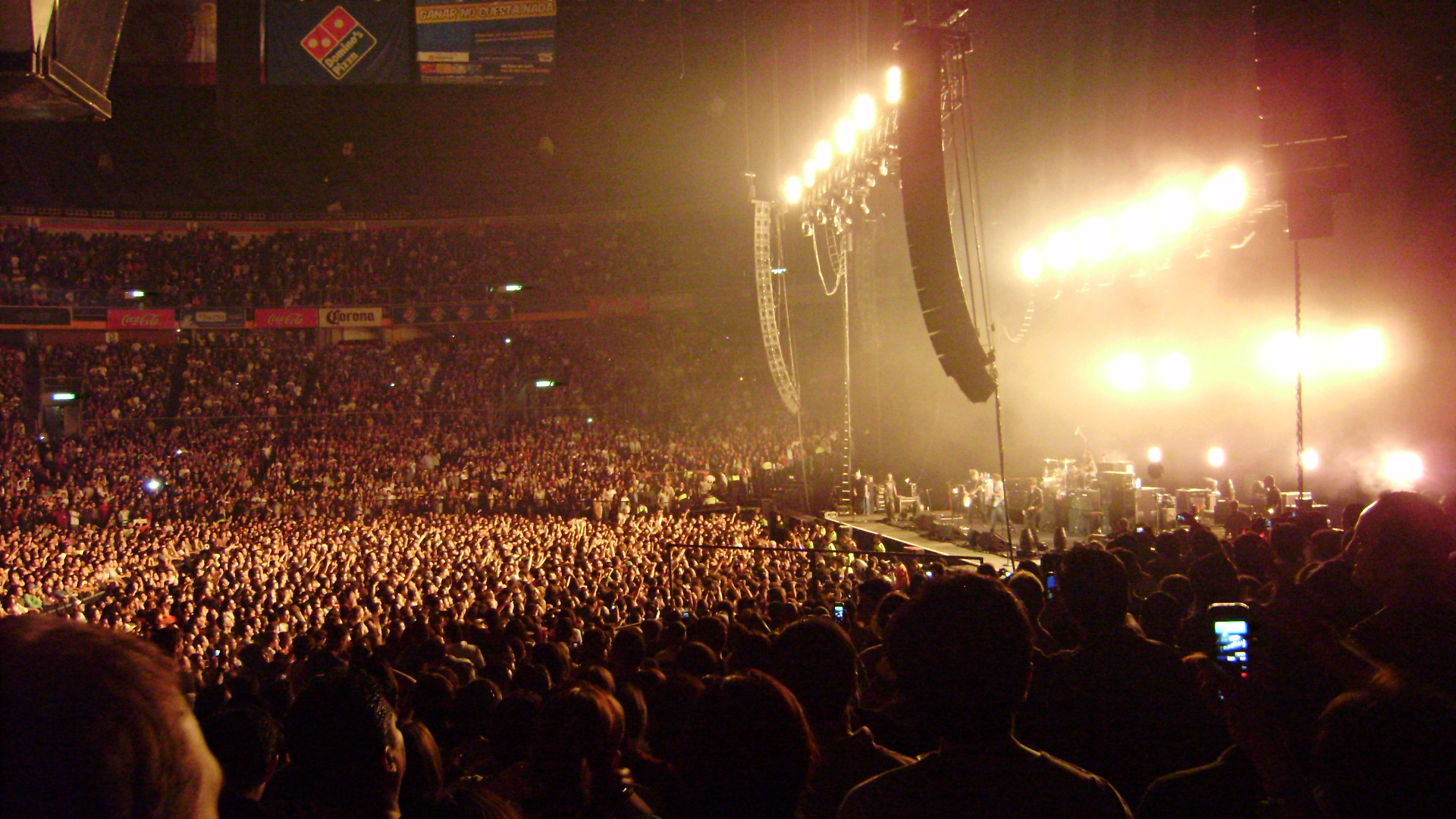
The Palacio de los Deportes, where the DVD was recorded.

Tour Generación RBD En Vivo is the first live material release of Mexican pop group RBD. The video was released on 26 August 2005 in Mexico and on 8 November 2005 in the United States. The DVD includes footage of RBD's first concert tour, Tour Generación RBD, which OCESA certified the No. 1 tour of 2005 in Mexico. The tour was seen by over 900,000 fans and visited over 30 Mexican cities, as well as Venezuela, Colombia, Puerto Rico and Ecuador. The live performances shown in the release were filmed during RBD's 7 concerts at the Palacio de los Deportes in Mexico City.

The DVD includes a whole live concert film, a documentary with never-before-seen footage of the group while on tour in its Mexican release, and on the edition released in the United States, a photo gallery.

== Track listings ==
- Tour Generación RBD En Vivo – Mexican edition
1. "Rebelde"
2. "Otro Día Que Va"
3. "Santa No Soy"
4. "Medley 1" ("Me He Enamorado De Un Fan"/"No Sé Si Es Amor"/"Ámame Hasta Con Los Dientes"/"Rayo Rebelde"/"Baile Del Sapo"/"Me Vale")
5. "Enséñame"
6. "Futuro Ex-Novio"
7. "Cuando El Amor Se Acaba"
8. "Liso, Sensual"
9. "A Rabiar"
10. "Una Canción"
11. "Medley 2" ("Cuando Baja La Marea"/"Te Quiero"/"Verano Peligroso"/"Devuélveme A Mi Chica"/"La Chica Del Bikini Azul"/"Viviendo De Noche"/"De Música Ligera"/"Es Mejor Así")
12. "Fuego"
13. "Sálvame"
14. "Tenerte Y Quererte"
15. "Un poco de tu amor"
16. "Solo quédate en silencio"
17. "Rebelde" (Cumbia version)
- Bonus material:
1. Documentary
- Tour Generación RBD En Vivo – US edition (track list only differs from the Mexican edition by omitting both medleys)
- Bonus material:
1. Photo gallery

== Personnel ==
Credits adapted from the DVD's liner notes.

Mastered at

- Cosmos Mastering, Mexico

Performance credits

- RBD – all vocals

Musicians

- Güido Laris – bass
- Mauricio Soto Lartigue – drums
- Martino Schramm – guitar
- Eduardo Téllez Sierra – keyboards

Production

- Camilo Lara – A&R
- Melissa Mochulske – A&R coordination
- Güido Laris – arrangements, musical director
- Grako Gilbert – authoring
- Pedro Damián – executive producer
- Carlos Lara – executive producer
- Luis Luisillo Miguel – associate producer
- Emilio Ávila – executive producer (concert)
- Hula Hula – graphic design, additional photography
- Marisol Alcelay – marketing, product manager
- Armando Ávila – mixer
- Raúl González Biestro – DVD mixing, production
- Raúl Oropeza – DVD mixing engineer
- Carolina Palomo Ramos – production coordinator
- Melissa Mochulske – DVD coordination
- Mara Arakelian – DVD coordination
- Sofía Diez de Bonilla – DVD coordination
- Armando Ávila – producer
- Andrew Rose – recording assistant
- Juan Carlos Moguel – additional recording
- Ricardo Trabulsi – photographer
- Gabriel Alarcón – additional photography
- Víctor Deschamps – additional photography

== Charts and certifications ==
=== Weekly charts ===
Chart	Peak Position
Argentina CAPIF – Top 20 Musical DVDs	17
Brazil ABPD – Top 25 Music DVDs	2
Spain PROMUSICAE – Top 20 Musical DVDs	1

=== Year-end charts ===
Charts	Peak Position
Brazil ABPD – Top 25 Music DVDs (2005)	9
Brazil ABPD – Top 25 Music DVDs (2006)	3
Spain PROMUSICAE Top 20 Musical DVDs (2006)	3

=== Certifications ===
Region	Certification	Certified units/sales
Mexico (AMPROFON)	2× Platinum+Gold	50,000^{^}
Spain (PROMUSICAE)	Gold	10,000^{^}
United States (RIAA)	Platinum	100,000^{^}
^{^} Shipments figures based on certification alone.

== Release history ==
Region	Date	Format	Label
Mexico	26 August 2005	DVD	EMI
United States	8 November 2005	DVD	EMI

== See also ==
- Tour Generación RBD En Vivo (Album)
