= ¿Que Hay Detrás de RBD? =

- Produced by: Pedro Damián; Luis Luisillo Miguel; Camilo Lara; Carolina Palomo Ramos; Raúl González Biestro
- Starring: RBD
- Production company: EMI Music
- Release date: April 13, 2006 (Mexico)
- Running time: 93 minutes
- Country: Mexico
- Language: spanish

¿Que Hay Detrás de RBD? is a documentary DVD release by Mexican pop group RBD. The documentary was released in Brazil and Mexico on April 13, 2006, by EMI Music, just a week after the major release of the group's Live in Hollywood concert video. The DVD was recorded during the international leg of the group's 'Tour Generación RBD', and includes a backstage pass to RBD's experience while on the road as well as footage of the band in Colombia, Mexico, Puerto Rico, and Venezuela. The film has also been released in the United States.

The DVD contains live performances of the group's hit songs "Rebelde", "Sálvame" and "Nuestro Amor". The release also includes the making of and the music video for "Aún Hay Algo". Actress Karla Cossío, who was part of the cast of the telenovela Rebelde alongside all the members of RBD, served as presenter and interviewer throughout the documentary. The project's name comes from the track "Qué Hay Detrás", from the group's second studio album.

== Cast ==
- Anahí
- Dulce María
- Christian Chávez
- Alfonso Herrera
- Christopher von Uckermann
- Maite Perroni
- Karla Cossío
- Pedro Damián

== Contents ==
1. The Beginning of RBD
2. RBD in Medellín, Colombia
3. "Rebelde"
4. Making of and music video: "Aún Hay Algo"
5. RBD in Cali, Colombia
6. "Sálvame"
7. RBD in Los Angeles, California
8. "Solo Quédate En Silencio"
9. "Nuestro Amor"

== Commercial performance ==
The DVD was very successful in Brazil, where it sold more than 110,000 copies and gained a 3× Platinum certification. According to the Associação Brasileira dos Produtores de Discos, ¿Qué Hay Detrás de RBD? became the 4th best-selling music DVD in Brazil in 2006, only behind RBD's own first two releases, Tour Generación RBD En Vivo and Live in Hollywood, and the DVD Duetos by Brazilian singer Roberto Carlos.

== Personnel ==
Credits adapted from the DVD's liner notes.

Performance credits

- RBD – main artist

Production

- Grako Gilbert – authoring (for Guilsys)
- Melissa Mochulske – coordination
- Sofía Diez Bonilla – coordination
- Pedro Damián – executive producer
  - Luis Luisillo Miguel – associate producer
- Camilo Lara – executive producer (for EMI Music)
- Carolina Palomo Ramos – production coordinator
- Raúl González Biestro – production
- Hula Hula – graphic design (for www.hulahula.com.mx)
- Marisol Alcelay – marketing, product manager
- Olga Laris – photography
- Ricardo Trabulsi – photography

== Charts and certifications ==
=== Year-end charts ===
| Chart (2006) | Position |
|---|---|
| Brazil (ABPD) | 4 |

=== Certifications and sales ===
| Country and certifying agency | Certification | Sales |
|---|---|---|
| Brazil (ABPD) | 3× Platinum | 110,000 |

== Release history ==
| Region | Date | Format | Label |
|---|---|---|---|
| Mexico | April 13, 2006 | DVD | EMI |
| Brazil | April 13, 2006 | DVD | EMI |
