= Nuestro Amor (RBD song) =

2005 song by RBD

Single by RBD

from the album Nuestro Amor
- Language: Spanish
- English title: "Our Love"
- Released: 25 August 2005
- Recorded: 2005
- Genre: Latin pop; Pop rock; Teen pop
- Length: 3:33
- Label: EMI
- Songwriters: Memo Méndez Guiu; Emil "Billy" Méndez
- Producers: Armando Ávila; Pedro Damián (executive)

RBD singles chronology
"Un poco de tu amor" (2005)	"Nuestro Amor" (2005)	"Aún hay algo" (2005)

Music video
- "Nuestro Amor" on YouTube

"Nuestro Amor" is a song by Mexican pop group RBD, released on 25 August 2005 as the lead single from the group's second studio album of the same name. The song was used to promote the second season of the soap opera Rebelde.

== Background and release ==
The telenovela Rebelde began production of its second season in 2005. The group (who lead the cast of young actors in the show) recorded their second studio album Nuestro Amor and continued to tour while on break. "Nuestro Amor" was released on 25 August 2005 as the album's lead single, and it was used as the new theme song for the show's second season. Unlike the first season, parts of the music video were not used for the intro.

Following the success of the band's Brazilian edition of their debut album, production decided to give Nuestro Amor the same treatment, and had the group record a Portuguese version titled Nosso Amor Rebelde. The song's Portuguese version is called "Nosso Amor" and was released as a single in Brazil in May 2006. A new music video for this version of the song was planned but ended up being scrapped.

An English version of the song was also recorded, under the title "This Is Love" ("Esto Es Amor"), as part of RBD's first English studio album, Rebels, released in November 2006. Despite singing the second pre-chorus with Maite Perroni in the original and Portuguese versions, Alfonso Herrera was absent in this version of the song.

== Composition and lyrics ==
"Nuestro Amor" is a Latin pop, pop rock and teen pop song that lasts for three minutes and 33 seconds. It was written by Memo Méndez Guiu and Emil "Billy" Méndez, and produced by Pedro Damián, the show's executive producer. It is structured in the verse-pre-chorus-chorus form. The song is assumed to be sung from the point of view of the actors' characters in the telenovela, although Herrera and Anahí don't sing together like Dulce María and Christopher von Uckermann. The song is written in the key of E major with a tempo of 130 beats per minute.

The lyrics find the group celebrating their new love. The song opens with Dulce and von Uckermann, each describing their love as "magical" and "easy". The first pre-chorus is done by Perroni with Christian Chávez, comparing it to "a dream", and saying how "everything is happening". During the chorus, the band affirm that their love "i[t']s like this / And there's nothing to do about it", asserting "this is how it happens, this love". The second verse is sung by Chávez and Anahí, with the former calling it "so simple" and the latter stating "And I don't know how long [this] love will last / But today", before stating in unison that "there's nothing better". The second pre-chorus is done by Perroni with Herrera. The second and third choruses are repeated twice, with a guitar solo doubling as a bridge in between them. The last chorus includes four ad-libs from Anahí and Chávez each, with the former belting hers.

Writing for Billboard, Jessica Roiz described the song as a "pop-rock jam that spotlights a love story that is simple and sweet". Lucas Villa of Uproxx ranked it at number 6 on his list of RBD's 20 Best Songs, calling it one of the band's "most spellbinding releases" and said the group "channele[d] their lyrics about an otherworldly love into an electrifying anthem that truly feels larger than life". For Mariana Canhisares of Omelete, the song "bets on optimism and shows the most romantic and fun side" of any love.

== Music video ==
The music video for the song was filmed in early August 2005 at Jardines del Pedregal, Mexico City, and was directed by Amin Azali. It was their first video not directed by Pedro Damián and premiered in September in the United States and Mexico.

It is supposed to take place sometime during the events of the telenovela, as the pairings shown in the video are from the show, and not real life. The video is about a "date" the girls and boys of RBD have. It starts with a phone call between Dulce María and von Uckermann, with Dulce in a bathub and von Uckermann in a window of another building. The girls then dress up elegantly for the date night they are about to have. The male members get ready for the romantic dinner, too, in a Japanese-looking house, where they look for the girls as they had left clues for them in order to find them. Finally, the band walk outside and sit around, sing, enjoy the moonlight and share some bottles of wine, at first thought to be milk, from which they drink.

== Chart performance ==
The song became RBD's fifth major hit in Mexico. The song peaked at number two on Billboard Latin Pop Airplay chart and number six on Billboard's Hot Latin Songs and Latin Tropical Airplay chart. The song also peaked at number 33 in its 10th week on the Romanian Airplay Chart.

== Release history ==
Region	Date
Mexico	August 2005
Worldwide	October 2005
Brazil (Portuguese version)	May 2006

== Track listing ==
- Digital download
1. "Nuestro Amor" – 3:35
- Digital download / Portuguese version
1. "Nosso Amor" – 3:36
- Digital download / English version
1. "This Is Love" – 3:40

== Credits and personnel ==
- Alfonso Herrera – vocals
- Anahí – lead vocals
- Armando Ávila – producer
- Cláudio Rabello – song adaptation to Portuguese
- Christian Chávez – vocals
- Christopher von Uckermann – vocals
- Dulce María – vocals
- Emil "Billy" Méndez – songwriter
- Lynda Thomas – chorus vocals (uncredited)
- Maite Perroni – vocals
- Memo Méndez Guiu - songwriter
- Pedro Damián – executive producer

== Charts ==
Chart (2005/06)	Peak position
Bolivia (Notimex)	2
Mexico Spanish AC/POP (Monitor Latino)	6
Romania (Airplay 100)	33
US Hot Latin Songs (Billboard)	6
US Latin Pop Airplay (Billboard)	2
US Latin Tropical Airplay (Billboard)	6

=== Year-end charts ===
Chart (2006)	Position
Brazil (Crowley) Portuguese version	17
Mexico (Monitor Latino)	10

== Moderatto version ==
"Nuestro Amor"

Single by Moderatto and Anahí

from the album Rockea Bien Duro
- Language: Spanish
- English title: "Our Love"
- Released: December 3, 2021
- Genre: Latin rock
- Length: 3:42
- Label: Universal
- Songwriters: Memo Méndez Guiu; Emil "Billy" Méndez
- Producers: Jay de la Cueva; Ettore Grenci

Moderatto singles chronology
"El Que Busca Encuentra" (2019)	"Nuestro Amor" (2021)	"Ser O Parecer (Versión 2022)" (2022)

Music video
- "Nuestro Amor" on YouTube

Mexican rock band Moderatto invited Anahí to record a rock cover version. It was released on 3 December 2021, through Universal Music as the first single from Moderatto's tribute album to RBD, which features the group's most-known hits, titled Rockea Bien Duro.

=== Music video ===
The music video was released on 9 February 2022, using chroma key, showing Moderatto alongside Anahí, who wears a costume that resembles the ones that she used to wear during tours while in RBD.
