= Sálvame =

2005 single by RBD

- Official cover art

Single by RBD

from the album Rebelde
- Language: Spanish
- English title: "Save Me"
- Released: 15 March 2005
- Recorded: 2004; 2005 (Pt. version); 2006 (Eng. version)
- Genre: Latin pop; sentimental ballad
- Length: 3:43
- Label: EMI
- Songwriters: Carlos Lara; Max di Carlo; Pedro Damián
- Producers: Carlos Lara; Max di Carlo

RBD singles chronology
"Sólo Quédate En Silencio" (2004)	"Sálvame" (2005)	"Un poco de tu amor" (2005)

Music video
- "Sálvame" on YouTube

"Sálvame" is a song recorded by Mexican pop group RBD for their debut album, Rebelde (2004). The track was written by Pedro Damián, Max di Carlo and Carlos Lara, produced by the latter two and released on 15 March 2005 as the album's third single by EMI. Regarded by fans as the group's "Hymn to Love", it was a number one hit all over Latin America, becoming their third consecutive number-one single in Mexico.

It is a melancholic song with lyrics expressing heartbreak, with Anahí singing the lead vocals while the rest of the band sing on the chorus. Its Portuguese and English versions were released alongside their albums in 2005 and 2006, respectively. A music video was filmed in Canada and features Anahí singing while the band play instruments and sing the chorus. The group's organization, Fundación Sálvame, was started in 2006, following an incident in Brazil, and operates in the country, Mexico, and Spain.

== Background ==
In June 2004, Televisa began production on the teen-oriented telenovela Rebelde, and its lead young actors, Anahí, Alfonso Herrera, Dulce María, Christopher von Uckermann, Maite Perroni, and Christian Chávez, were put together by the show's producers to form the band RBD. The song was featured extensively throughout the show, was used as one of the theme songs, was used mostly during scenes featuring a tearful "Mía", (played by Anahí). Following the album's 30 November 2004 release to positive reviews and commercial success, the track became a fan-favorite.

== Release ==
Preceded by "Rebelde" and "Solo Quédate En Silencio", "Sálvame" was released on 15 March 2005, as the album's third single. In Brazil, the song was released along with "Solo Quédate en Silencio", on a double A-Side single. The band recorded a Portuguese version of their debut album, adapted by renowned songwriter Cláudio Rabello, following immense success in Brazil, and the song's version in the language was also released as a single in the country, under the title "Salva-me".

The song's sequel, "Algún Día", was recorded and sung solely by Anahí in 2006, and is featured on RBD's third Spanish studio album, Celestial. The English version, "Save Me", was recorded and featured on RBD's English studio album, Rebels, also from 2006, with a different instrumental. Anahí was the main singer on the two new versions as she was on the original Spanish version. "Sálvame" is the group's only solo song to be recorded in all three languages.

== Composition and lyrics ==
"Sálvame" is a Latin pop ballad that lasts for 3 minutes and 43 seconds. It was written and produced by Carlos Lara and Max di Carlo, with additional lyrical contributions from Pedro Damián. Like its predecessor, it was written in the verse-refrain-prechorus-chorus structure, in the key of G major with 184 beats per minute. The lyrics find Anahí in a depressed state since her lover left her. In the first verse, she sings "Vivo en la desesperanza" ("I live in hopelessness"), while in the refrain she states she "survives from pure anxiety" ("Sobrevivo por pura ansiedad"). In the pre-chorus, the singer says that "little by little the heart, is losing faith" ("Poco a poco el corazón, va perdiendo la fe"). In the second verse, Anahí reveals that despite her attempts to move on, "...love is the word, that is sometimes hard for [her] to forget" ("...amor es la palabra, que me cuesta a veces olvidar"). During the chorus, she pleads for her ex-partner to save her from "loneliness" and "darkness". The band echoes this sentiment, stating: "Save me from oblivion" and "weariness" ("Sálvame del olvido", "Sálvame del hastío").

Jessica Roiz of Billboard called the song "one of [the band's] iconic tracks" and described it as "a heartfelt ballad about a broken heart that yearns to be saved". Lucas Villa of Uproxx said Anahí "sings her heart out about trying to survive the fallout from a crushing breakup". Mariana Canhisares of Omelete, described the track as "RBD's big anthem about suffering" and that it "talks of heartbreak in such a painful way".

== Music video ==
The music video was the group's third to have been directed by Pedro Damián. The group and young cast of the telenovela traveled to film some scenes in Canada, and production used the opportunity to shoot the music video for the song in the country. Some viewers thought the video was filmed in Toluca due to its snowy setting. The band perform the track on the snow, playing instruments, like drums and guitars, with Anahí singing the song, while their castmates skate in the background. Behind the scenes footage was also used in the video.

Following the re-release of RBD's music in 2020, "Sálvame" became their most-viewed video on YouTube. It has accumulated over 197 million views as of August 2026.

== Live performances ==
The song has been performed on several occasions. In 2005, RBD performed on the Mexican program No Manches, where they included the song in their setlist. In the same year, they participated in the program Otro Rollo performing "Rebelde", "Sólo Quédate en Silencio", "Sálvame", "Nuestro Amor" and "Un Poco de Tu Amor". In 2005, they participated in the program Sonricslandia performing the song. The single was included in the setlist of their first national tour, which passed through all of Mexico and began on 3 January 2005, entitled Tour Generación RBD. During this tour, the group's first CD/DVD entitled Tour Generación RBD En Vivo was released. Also in 2005, they performed the song during the Celebración Virgen de Guadalupe.

In January 2006, the band filmed the CD/DVD titled Live in Hollywood, made in promotion of their second studio album, which contains a medley of the first three singles from Rebelde. In October 2006, during their visit to Brazil, RBD performed the song's Portuguese version, "Salva-Me", on the program Domingo Legal. During the tour in the country, they performed the song, with the band providing the choruses in Portuguese. During the shows in Manaus and Fortaleza, the song was sung entirely in this language. The concert in Rio de Janeiro, where the 2007 DVD Live in Rio was filmed, features Anahí singing only the second verse and refrain in Portuguese. In December 2006, they appeared in Teletón México, performing the song.

The track was included on the group's 2007 Tour Celestial, which spawned the CD/DVD Hecho en España, filmed in Madrid. Anahí says "I do, I do believe in fairies", while performing the track in small, purple, fairy-like wings. The next year, the song was performed throughout the Empezar Desde Cero World Tour and the band's then-last concert series, the Tour del Adiós.

During RBD's reunion show, Ser o Parecer: The Global Virtual Union, which took place on 26 December 2020, Anahí once again performed the song, against a vibrant blue background, dressed in a black and white ensemble. After giving a speech about unity and love, she was joined by Christian, Maite, and Christopher (as they were the only ones to take part of the show), for the last chorus. "Sálvame" was included on the setlist of the band's 2023 concert series, the Soy Rebelde Tour. It was performed by Anahí with support from the two backing vocalists, instead of having the band sing the choruses.

== Critical reception ==
In 2025, Rolling Stone en Español listed "Sálvame" as the 54th greatest Spanish-language song of the 21st century.

== Awards and nominations ==
Year	Ceremony	Award	Result	Ref.
2005	Premios Juventud	Canción Corta-Venas (Best Ballad)	Nominated	

== Track listing ==
Digital download

1. "Sálvame" – 3:43

Digital download / Rebelde (Edição Brasil) / Portuguese version

1. "Salva-me" – 3:45

Digital download / Live in Hollywood

1. "Medley Rebelde - Live" (Medley with "Rebelde" and "Sólo Quédate En Silencio") – 8:31

Digital download / Rebels / English version

1. "Save Me" – 3:56

Digital download / Ser O Parecer: The Global Virtual Union

1. "Sálvame (En Vivo)" (2020 live version) – 5:21

== Credits and personnel ==
- Alfonso Herrera – chorus vocals (Note: Only in live performances)
- Anahí – lead vocals
- Armando Ávila - producer
- Carlos Lara – songwriter, producer (Note: Originally credited as DJ Kafka), chorus vocals (uncredited)
- Cláudio Rabello – song adaptation to Portuguese
- Christian Chávez – chorus vocals
- Christopher von Uckermann – chorus vocals
- Dulce María – backing vocals, chorus vocals
- Lynda Thomas – chorus vocals (uncredited)
- Maite Perroni – chorus vocals
- Max di Carlo – songwriter, producer

== Charts ==
=== Weekly charts ===
Chart (2005-2006)	Peak position
Chile (Lincoln Journal)	6
Colombia (Hispanos Unidos)	5
El Salvador (La Nación)	7
Guatemala (La Nación)	1
Mexico (Hispanos Unidos)	5
US Latin Pop Airplay (Billboard)	27

=== Year-end charts ===
Chart (2006)	Position
Brazil (Crowley) (Portuguese version)	97

== Certifications ==
Certifications for "Sálvame"
Region	Certification	Certified units/sales
Brazil (Pro-Música Brasil)	Gold	30,000^{‡}
^{‡} Sales+streaming figures based on certification alone.
