= Rebelde (album) =

RBD's 2004 debut album

Studio album by RBD
- Released: 30 November 2004
- Recorded: 2004
- Studios: Cosmos Studios México (Mexico City, Mexico); The Box (Los Angeles, California)
- Genres: Latin pop; teen pop; rock
- Length: 37:13
- Languages: Spanish; Portuguese (Edición diamante)
- Labels: EMI; Capitol; Televisa
- Producers: Armando Ávila; Carlos Lara; Max di Carlo; Pedro Damián (executive)

RBD chronology
Rebelde (2004)	Nuestro Amor (2005)

RBD video chronology
Rebelde (2004)	Tour Generación RBD En Vivo (2005)

Rebelde Edición Diamante

Singles from Rebelde
- 1. "Rebelde" Released: 30 September 2004; 2. "Sólo Quédate En Silencio" Released: 2 December 2004; 3. "Sálvame" Released: 15 March 2005; 4. "Un poco de tu amor" Released: 4 July 2005

Professional ratings
Review scores
Source	Rating
Allmusic	4/5 stars

Rebelde (English: Rebel or Rebellious) is the debut studio album by Mexican group RBD. It was released on 30 November 2004 in Mexico, on 11 January 2005 in the United States and the rest of Hispanic America, 30 October in Brazil, and 17 July 2006 in Spain, by EMI, Capitol, and Televisa. It was produced by Armando Ávila, Carlos Lara, Max di Carlo, and Pedro Damián and recorded at the studios of the former two.

The album is a Latin pop, pop rock, and teen pop record, and contains themes of rebelliousness, love, heartbreak, and romance in its lyrics. It doubles as the soundtrack of the telenovela Rebelde (2004-06), which stars the group's members. It was supported by four singles; the first three, "Rebelde", "Sólo Quédate En Silencio", and "Sálvame", became number one hits in Mexico, while "Un Poco De Tu Amor" was only serviced to Mexican radio stations. The group also embarked on the Tour Generación RBD from 2005 to 2007 to promote the record, and, eventually, their second studio album as well.

The album reached number one in Mexico, Brazil and Spain, selling 550,000 copies in the group's country and receiving a diamond and gold certification from the AMPROFON. In the United States, it topped the Billboard Latin Pop Albums chart, while reaching number two on the main Top Latin Albums chart and selling over 400,000 copies in the country, attaining a Latin 4× platinum certification from the Recording Industry Association of America (RIAA). A Brazilian Portuguese version was recorded and released on 1 November 2005 following the show's success in the country, while a Diamond Edition was released on 2 March 2006. Rebelde sold over 1.5 million copies worldwide in its first two years of release, and was the tenth best selling EMI album of 2006. It is the 41st best-selling album in Mexico. In 2025, it was ranked at number 81 on Billboard's list of the Top Latin Albums of the 21st Century.

== Background and recording ==
In June 2004, filming began on the Mexican telenovela Rebelde; its six main young actors Anahí, Alfonso Herrera, Dulce María, Maite Perroni, Christopher von Uckermann and Christian Chávez, would go on to form the musical group RBD, having their first studio album released on 30 November 2004, in Mexico. The album's vocals were recorded in just two days, as stated by the members of RBD themselves, in the studios of two of the album's producers: Armando Ávila and Carlos Lara. The record was executive produced by renowned Mexican television producer Pedro Damián. It also features Mexican singer-songwriter Lynda Thomas as an uncredited backing vocalist. The album was later released on 11 January 2005, in the United States and the rest of Hispanic America.

A Latin pop and pop rock album with lyrics derivative of teen pop, Rebelde contains songs about being rebellious, heartbreak, love, and romance. The album includes four Spanish-language adaptations of English songs, with three of them being the first time the songs were recorded and released. The tracks "Futuro Ex-Novio", "Tenerte y Quererte", and "Fuego" were originally titled "Future Ex-Boyfriend", "Connected", and "Fire", respectively. "Santa No Soy" is a cover of "I Ain't No Saint" by German singer Vanessa Struhler, recorded for her 2003 album Ride with Me. Max di Carlo adapted "Connected", while the Spanish versions for the rest of the songs were handled by Michkin Boyzo.

== Promotion ==
=== Singles ===
"Rebelde" (2004)
First single off the album and RBD's signature song.

As part of the album's promotion, starting September 2004, four singles were released. The lead single off the album, "Rebelde", was released on September 30, 2004, and reached number 1 on the Mexican charts. The second single was "Sólo Quédate en Silencio", which, after being released on December 2, also became a number one hit in Mexico. The third single was the ballad "Sálvame", which was named the most-played song on Mexican radio in 2005. The song has singer Anahí performing its main vocals while the rest of the band sings the chorus. The single was released on March 15, 2005. The fourth and last single from the album was "Un poco de tu amor", which was released on July 4, 2005, only to Mexican radio. The album's singles were used as part of the telenovela's soundtrack, with lead single "Rebelde" becoming the TV show's main theme.

Three music videos were filmed to promote the singles "Rebelde", "Solo Quédate En Silencio", and "Sálvame", and were all directed by Pedro Damián. Aside from the album's four official singles, two other songs from the album had radio promotion: "Otro Día Que Va" and "Enséñame".

=== Tour ===
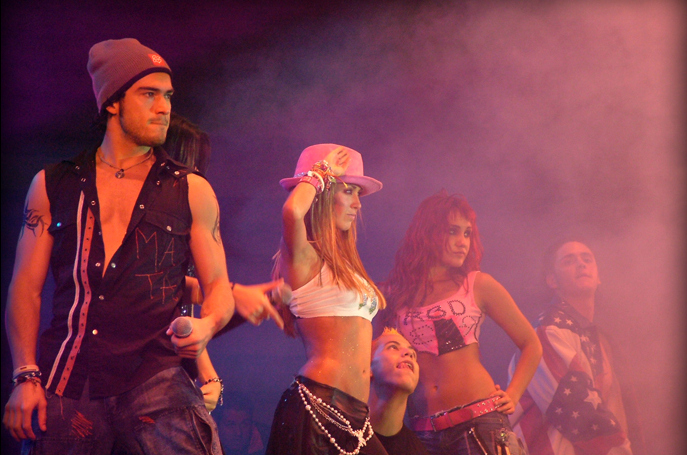
RBD during their concert in Tijuana, Mexico (2005).

RBD's first national tour, Tour Generación RBD, sold out every single date. The group offered 35 concerts in Mexico, starting January 3, 2005, and ending August 28, 2005, in the Auditorio Nacional. On October 21, 2005, an expanded international leg for the tour led the group to visit Colombia for the first time. This was soon followed with first visits to Venezuela, Puerto Rico and Ecuador, experimenting the same level of success in these countries as in the band's native Mexico. The group also visited the United States and Brazil in 2006.

Three concerts spawned live CDs and DVDs. The first was Tour Generación RBD En Vivo, which was filmed at the Palacio de los Deportes arena in Mexico City on 27 May 2005, and released on 19 July, while its DVD counterpart followed on 26 August.

The second live album came from their show at the Hollywood Pantages Theatre, their first show in Los Angeles, California, recorded on 21 January 2006. Released under the name Live in Hollywood, it featured the songs from the band's second studio album, Nuestro Amor, and included a medley of the first three singles from Rebelde.

The third DVD was recorded in Rio de Janeiro, Brazil, on 7 October 2006. Performing for an audience of 100,000 people, the setlist included songs from both albums, and the show was released as Live in Rio on 2 February 2007.

== Commercial performance ==
The album went on to be certified diamond and gold in Mexico, shipping 550,000 copies and topping the Mexican Albums Chart for twelve non-consecutive weeks. Due to the success of the album, the band recorded a Portuguese language version of Rebelde for their growing fanbase in Brazil, titled Rebelde (Edição Brasil). RBD became the first foreign act in Brazil to have two albums in different languages in the top ten of the Brazilian Albums Chart at the same time, with both albums reaching number one. In 2006, the original Spanish-language version of the album was also released in Spain. RBD eventually topped the Spain Albums Chart with their debut album for five consecutive weeks. The album also spent more than 50 weeks in the Billboard Top Latin Albums chart in the United States, peaking at number two and spending over 2 months in the chart's top 5, selling over 400,000 copies in the country and being certified 4× platinum (Latin field) by the RIAA. Worldwide, the album went on to sell more than 1,500,000 copies.

== Lyrical interpretation and reception ==
Writing for Remezcla, Ana Clara Ribeiro compiled a list of songs by RBD for the article "Our 15 Favorite RBD, Ranked". "Futuro Ex-Novio" was placed at number fourteen, and was described as the men singing about a "one-night stand with a woman that leaves them broken-hearted". She described them as showing a "vibrant dynamic", with "[Uckermann] and [Herrera]'s voices contrasting with [Chávez]'s higher range". The track "Enséñame" was ranked at number seven, and was described as a "sweet, reggae-pop" and one of the women's "best moments together". "Sólo Quédate En Silencio" was ranked at number five, described as one of the group's "sentimental love songs" and "incorporat[ing] romantic tension" from the actors' characters in the telenovela. Placed at number two was "Rebelde", which Ribeiro called "[t]he anthem of an entire generation"; she stated that the "first guitar chords are enough to bring up memories" to the group's fans. The ballad "Sálvame" was ranked at number one, described as the band's most "dramatic" and "definite angst" song. Ribeiro called its production and lyrics "extremely depressing".

Following the start of the group's 2023 Soy Rebelde Tour, Mariana Canhisares of Omelete published the article "10 músicas para entrar no clime da turnê" ("10 songs to get in the [vibe] for the tour"). Writing about "Santa No Soy" (which was excluded from the tour's setlist), she described it as "women without fear of being who they are".

== Track listing ==
Rebelde – Standard edition
No.	Title	Writer(s)	Producer(s)	Length
1.	"Rebelde"	Carlos Lara (Note: Billed as DJ Kafka); Max di Carlo	Carlos Lara; Max di Carlo	3:33
2.	"Sólo Quédate En Silencio"	Mauricio L. Arriaga	Armando Ávila	3:38
3.	"Otro Día Que Va"	Lara; di Carlo	Ávila	3:27
4.	"Un Poco De Tu Amor"	Lara; di Carlo	Lara; di Carlo	3:34
5.	"Enséñame"	Javier Calderón	Lara; di Carlo	3:39
6.	"Futuro Ex-Novio"	Sean Hosein; Dane DeViller (Note: Hosein and DeViller were billed as Sean & Dame); Steve Smith; Anthony Anderson; Michkin Boyzo	Ávila	3:00
7.	"Tenerte y Quererte"	Guy Roche; Amy Powers; di Carlo	Ávila	3:25
8.	"Cuando el Amor Se Acaba"	José Manuel Pérez Marino	Lara; di Carlo	3:19
9.	"Santa No Soy"	Nick Nice; Pontus Söderqvist (Note: Both billed as LaCarr); Judith Denise Sim; Boyzo	Ávila	3:08
10.	"Fuego"	Niklas Bergwall; Niclas Kings (Note: Both billed as Double N); Johan Ramström; Patrik Magnusson (Note: Both billed as RamPac); Papa Dee; Boyzo	Ávila	3:00
11.	"Sálvame"	Lara; di Carlo; Pedro Damián	Lara; di Carlo	3:42
Total length:				37:15

Rebelde – Edición Diamante (bonus disc)
No.	Title	Writer(s)	Producer(s)	Length
12.	"Rebelde - Versão Português"	Lara; di Carlo; Cláudio Rabello	Lara; di Carlo	3:34
13.	"Fique Em Silêncio"	Arriaga; Rabello	Ávila	3:41
14.	"Querer-te"	Roche; Powers; Rabello	Ávila	3:18
Total length:				47:48

Rebelde – Edición Diamante (Enhanced content)
No.	Title	Length
1.	"Photo Gallery"
2.	"Screensavers"
3.	"Mouse Cursors"
4.	"Emoticons"
5.	"RBD Game"

== Personnel ==
Credits adapted from the album's liner notes.

Performance credits

- RBD – All vocals, background vocals
- Güido Laris – background vocals

Instruments

- Armando Ávila – all instruments, background vocals
- Max di Carlo – all instruments

Production

- Camilo Lara – A&R
- Melissa Mochulske – A&R coordination
- Güido Laris – arrangement, vocal producer
- Carlos Lara – background vocal arrangement, producer
- René Cárdenas, Juan Carlos Moguel – engineers
- Pedro Damián – executive producer
- Luis Luisillo Miguel – associate producer
- hulahula.com.mx – graphic design
- Marisol Alcelay – marketing
- Max di Carlo – mixer, producer, vocal producer, arrangement, programming
- Migliano Paglinio – additional musician
- Gib Taylor – additional musician
- Ramoncín Sosa – additional musician
- Emilio Ávila – production coordinator
- Jorge González – production assistant
- Armando Ávila – song translation to Spanish, producer
- Michkin Boyzo – song translation to Spanish, recording assistant
- Ricardo Trabulsi – photographer

== Awards ==
Year	Ceremony	Award	Result
2005	Premios Oye!	Record of the Year	Nominated
2005	Premios Oye!	Breakthrough of the Year	Won
2005	Premios Oye!	Pop Album of the Year, Duo or Group	Won
2005	Premios Oye!	Best Selling Pop Album of the Year	Won
2005	Premios Juventud	Me Muero Sin Ese CD	Won
2006	Billboard Latin Music Awards	Latin Pop Album of the Year, Duo or Group	Won
2006	Billboard Latin Music Awards	Latin Pop Album of the Year, New Artist	Won
2006	Billboard Latin Music Awards	Top Latin Albums Artist of the Year	Nominated

== Charts ==
=== Weekly charts ===
Chart (2005–2006)	Peak Position
Brazilian Albums Chart	20
Mexican Albums Chart	1
Spain Albums Chart	1
US Billboard 200	95
US Billboard Top Latin Albums	2
US Billboard Latin Pop Albums	1

=== Year-end charts ===
Chart (2005–2006)	Position
Brazilian Albums Chart	13
Mexican Albums Chart	2
Spain Albums Chart	6
US Billboard Top Latin Albums	9
US Billboard Latin Pop Albums	5

== Certifications ==
Region	Certification	Certified units/sales
Brazil (Pro-Música Brasil)	2× Diamond+Platinum	750,000
Colombia (ASINCOL)	Platinum	70,000
Mexico (AMPROFON)	Diamond+Gold	550,000^{^}
Spain (Promusicae)	2× Platinum	200,000^{^}
United States (RIAA)	4× Platinum (Latin)	400,000^{^}
^{^} Shipments figures based on certification alone.

== Release history ==
Region	Date	Format	Label
Mexico	30 November 2004	CD, digital download	EMI
Latin America United States United Kingdom	11 January 2005	CD, digital download	EMI
Brazil	30 October 2005	CD, digital download	EMI
Spain	17 July 2006	CD, digital download	EMI
Worldwide	2 March 2006	Edición Diamante - CD, digital download	EMI

== See also ==
- List of best-selling albums in Mexico
- List of best-selling albums in Brazil
- List of best-selling Latin albums
