= Un poco de tu amor =

2005 radio single by RBD

"Un Poco De Tu Amor"

Single by RBD

from the album Rebelde
- Language: Spanish
- English title: "A Bit of Your Love"
- Released: 4 July 2005 (Mexico)
- Recorded: 2004
- Genre: Pop rock; Latin pop
- Length: 3:24
- Label: EMI
- Songwriters: Carlos Lara; Max di Carlo
- Producers: Armando Ávila; Carlos Lara; Max di Carlo; Pedro Damián (executive)

RBD singles chronology
"Sálvame" (2005)	"Un Poco De Tu Amor" (2005)	"Nuestro Amor" (2005)

Music video
- "Un Poco De Tu Amor" on YouTube

"Un Poco de Tu Amor" is a song by Mexican pop group RBD, released as the fourth single from their debut album Rebelde (2004), only to radios in Mexico. The song became the group's fourth hit in the country.

== Background and release ==
"Un Poco De Tu Amor" was meant to be the album's second single, but was replaced by "Sólo Quédate En Silencio" due to its radio airplay and marketing. Due to this, "Un Poco De Tu Amor" became the fourth and their first to be a radio-only single.

The song has a version in Portuguese titled "Um Pouco Desse Amor" (Spa. "Un Poco De Este Amor"; Eng: "A Little Bit of This Love"), included on the Portuguese edition of their debut album, which was entirely written by Cláudio Rabello. The song was also performed three times throughout the telenovela Rebelde, where the group are the six young lead actors.

The track notably features the vocals of singer Lynda Thomas during its chorus. Thomas would be a key voice in the group's career, recording choruses and backing vocals for their Spanish and English albums.

== Composition and lyrics ==
The song was written by DJ Kafka and Max di Carlo, and produced by the latter alongside Armando Ávila, Carlos Lara, and the show's executive producer Pedro Damián. It belongs to the pop rock and Latin pop genres, and has a duration of three minutes and 24 seconds. It contains the verse-refrain-pre-chorus-chorus structure and lyrically finds the group asking a person to notice them and their love for that person. It is written in the key of A♭ major with 120 beats per minute.

Christian takes both verses; in the first he acknowledges that he's "one more friend among the bunch" ("Un amigo más, entre el montón"), and that he's "a fan at heart, that doesn't stop dreaming about" the other person ("...un fan de corazón, que no te para de soñar"). In the second verse, he asks his crush to "give [him] a sign, one minute to talk" ("dame una señal, un minuto para conversar").

During the refrain, Anahí is more hopeful, singing: "Pero sé también, que entre la multitud alguna vez, pudieras ver la luz sobre mi piel" ("But I also know, that among the crowd sometime, you would see the light on my skin").

On the pre-chorus, Alfonso claims: "Yo necesito de ti como el aire, nadie te puede querer tanto así" ("I need you like the air, no one can love you like this").

During the chorus, Christian and Lynda Thomas ask for "Un poco de tu amor para poder vivir, un poco de tu amor me puede hacer feliz, solo un poco de tu amor es lo que pido" ("A little bit of your love to be able to live, a little bit of your love can make me happy, just a little bit of your love is what I ask for").

== Live performances ==
Throughout 2005, RBD performed "Un Poco De Tu Amor" on television shows, including Otro Rollo, hosted by Adal Ramones.

The song is included on most of RBD's live CDs and DVDs. Tour Generación RBD En Vivo, recorded and released in 2005, and Live in Rio, recorded in 2006 and released in 2007, respectively, both include a performance of the song in its entirety. In both shows, the second verse is sung by Christian and Dulce María. The first verse of the song in Live in Rio is performed by Christian in Portuguese. In other performances of the song during the tour's stops in Brazil, Alfonso and Anahí also perform their verses in the language.

For the band's Tour Celestial's Hecho en España CD and DVD (recorded and released in 2007) and Empezar Desde Cero Tour's Live in Brasília DVD (recorded in 2008 and released in 2009), the song was included on the "Medley Rebelde" segment. The version in the former live album starts with Alfonso singing the pre-chorus, while the version on the latter starts with the first verse and ends after the first chorus. Christian sings only the first line in Portuguese, while Anahí has the public sing most of her verse.

The group's then-last 2008 concert series, Tour del Adiós, features the track in full again. This version does not include Dulce María during the second verse of the song. During RBD's reunion show, 2020's Ser O Parecer: The Global Virtual Union, the song was included during the set. Due to Alfonso and Dulce's absences, Christopher and Maite sing both pre-choruses together. For the 2023 Soy Rebelde Tour, this time with Dulce María, the first pre-chorus was sung by Christopher and Maite, while the second one was sung with Dulce.

== Track listing ==
Digital download

1. "Un Poco De Tu Amor" – 3:26

Digital download / Portuguese version

1. "Um Pouco Desse Amor" – 3:21

== Credits and personnel ==
- Alfonso Herrera – vocals
- Anahí – vocals
- Armando Ávila - producer
- Carlos Lara (Note: Originally credited as DJ Kafka) – songwriter, producer
- Cláudio Rabello – song adaptation to Portuguese
- Christian Chávez – vocals
- Christopher von Uckermann – vocals (Note: Only in live performances)
- Dulce María – vocals
- Lynda Thomas – chorus vocals (uncredited)
- Maite Perroni – vocals
- Max di Carlo – songwriter, producer

== Charts ==
=== Weekly charts ===
Chart performance
Chart (2005)	Peak position
Guatemala (La Nación)	2
