= Rebelde (Edição Brasil) =

Album (reissue) by RBD

Studio album (reissue) by RBD
- Released: November 1, 2005
- Recorded: 2005
- Studio: Televisa
- Genres: Latin pop; pop rock; teen pop
- Length: 36:57
- Languages: Portuguese; Spanish
- Labels: EMI; SBT Music
- Producers: Armando Ávila, Max di Carlo, Carlos Lara, Pedro Damián (executive)

RBD chronology
Nuestro Amor (2005)	Rebelde (Edição Brasil) (2005)	Live in Hollywood (2006)

Singles from Rebelde (Edição Brasil)
- 1. "Rebelde" Released: November 1, 2005; 2. "Fique Em Silêncio" Released: December 16, 2005; 3. "Salva-Me" Released: January 20, 2006

Rebelde (Edição Brasil) (English: Rebel (Brazil Edition) and released as Rebelde (Edição Português) (EN: Rebel (Portuguese Edition) in the 2020 limited version) is the first Brazilian Portuguese studio album by Mexican group RBD. It was released on 1 November 2005, by EMI, in association with SBT Music. The Portuguese version of RBD's Spanish language debut, Rebelde (2004), it includes seven tracks recorded in Portuguese, and four Spanish tracks from the original version. The album was popular in Brazil, selling more than 250,000 copies in the country and being certified double platinum by Pro-Música Brasil.

== Production and recording ==
The Mexican telenovela, Rebelde, began production in mid 2004, premiering in Mexico and Hispanic America in October. Its cast was led by Anahí, Dulce María, Alfonso Herrera, Christopher von Uckermann, Maite Perroni, and Christian Chávez, who formed the group RBD. With the broadcast of the telenovela beginning in June 2005, through the SBT television network in Brazil, and the great success that the youthful plot was having on its likewise young demographic, SBT's production team had the idea to add support with a soundtrack of RBD's songs in Portuguese. The production first resolved to dub RBD's original Spanish songs by the show's voice-over actors, but the attempt received a negative public reaction, so it did not move forward.

Later, SBT's production team decided to attempt the project again, but only this time the soundtrack's vocals would be sung by the members of RBD themselves. This was made possible through training the band members in the Portuguese language, and recording was done while the group was still filming the telenovela.

The album contains the songs that form part of the soundtrack of the telenovela Rebelde (2005), broadcast in Brazil. Seven songs were translated and adapted by Cláudio Rabello, under the direction of the original album's executive producer, Pedro Damián. The tracks "Otro Día Que Va", "Futuro Ex-Novio", "Santa No Soy" and "Fuego" remained in Spanish. The album was released in association with SBT Music and the EMI label on 1 November 2005.

== Singles and promotion ==
Three singles were released as part of the album's promotion. The first single was the title track "Rebelde", which was launched alongside the album, on November 2005. The second single, "Fique Em Silêncio", was released in December. The song peaked at number one in Brazil through the Crowley Broadcast Analysis in 2006. It ended the year at the 25th position on the chart. In January 2006, the ballad "Salva-Me" was released as the last single. The song peaked at number 97 on the same chart at the end of the year.

The band performed the first single on the show Otro Rollo, hosted by Adal Ramones, in commemoration of the ending of the telenovela in Mexico. They presented the Portuguese versions of "Rebelde" and "Salvame", alongside the Spanish song "Sólo Quédate En Silencio" and the first two singles from their second studio album, on Domingo Legal on 1 October 2006. During the group's tour in the country, titled "Tour Brasil 2006", they performed "Fique Em Silêncio", while "Rebelde" gained a rock version at the end of the shows. (Note: In some performances of the former song, Anahí would sing the second refrain and her ad-libs in Spanish. "Rebelde" was first performed in Spanish as the opening number, and then in Portuguese to close the shows.) The track "Querer-te" was performed as a mash-up alongside its original version, "Tenerte y Quererte", with the first verse and second pre-chorus being performed in Portuguese by María and Perroni. Perroni would also sing the verses of her solo, "Quando O Amor Acaba", in some shows, with the band singing the choruses in Spanish. During "Salva-me", the band sang the Portuguese choruses in all the concerts, and Anahí sang her verses in Portuguese on select dates. Herrera and Anahí would also sing their verses of "Um Pouco Desse Amor" in some shows.

During their show in Rio de Janeiro on 8 October, the group recorded their third DVD, titled Live in Rio, which was released on 2 February 2007. It featured the first verse of "Um Pouco Desse Amor" performed by Chávez, mash-ups of "Querer-te" and "Salva-me" with their Spanish versions, "Fique Em Silêncio", and the rock version of "Rebelde" in Portuguese.

Professional ratings
Review scores
Source	Rating
Allmusic	4/5 stars

== Track listing ==
Rebelde (Edição Brasil)
No.	Title	Writer(s)	Producer(s)	Length
1.	"Rebelde – Versão Português"	Carlos Lara (Note: Billed as DJ Kafka); Max di Carlo; Cláudio Rabello	Carlos Lara; Max di Carlo	3:32
2.	"Fique Em Silêncio"	Mauricio L. Arriaga; Rabello	Armando Ávila	3:37
3.	"Um Pouco Desse Amor"	Lara; di Carlo	Lara; di Carlo	3:20
4.	"Ensina-me"	Javier Calderón; Rabello	Lara; di Carlo	3:39
5.	"Querer-te"	Guy Roche; Amy Powers; Rabello	Lara; di Carlo	3:17
6.	"Quando O Amor Acaba"	José Manuel Pérez Marino; Rabello	Lara; di Carlo	3:18
7.	"Salva-me"	Lara; di Carlo; Pedro Damián; Rabello	Lara; di Carlo	3:43
8.	"Otro Día Que Va"	Lara; di Carlo	Ávila	3:27
9.	"Futuro Ex-Novio"	Sean Hosein; Dane DeViller (Note: Both billed as Sean & Dame); Steve Smith; Anthony Anderson; Michkin Boyzo	Ávila	2:59
10.	"Santa No Soy"	Nick Nice; Pontus Söderqvist (Note: Both billed as LaCarr); Judith Denise Sim; Michkin Boyzo	Ávila	3:07
11.	"Fuego"	Niklas Bergwall; Niclas Kings (Note: Both billed as Double N); Johan Ramström; Patrik Magnusson (Note: Both billed as RamPac); Papa Dee; Boyzo	Ávila	3:00
Total length:				36:57

== Charts ==
=== Year-end chart ===
Chart (2005)	Peak Position
Brazilian Albums Chart	12

== Release history ==
Region	Date	Format	Label
Brazil	1 November 2005	CD, digital download	EMI, SBT Music
Worldwide	3 September 2020	Streaming	Universal
