= Nuestro Amor =

2005 studio album by RBD

Studio album by RBD
- Released: 22 September 2005
- Recorded: 2005
- Genres: Latin pop; pop rock; teen pop
- Length: 48:24
- Languages: Spanish; Portuguese (Edición diamante)
- Labels: Capitol; EMI
- Producers: Carlos Lara; Max di Carlo; Armando Ávila; Pedro Damián (exec.)

RBD chronology
Tour Generación RBD En Vivo (2005)	Nuestro Amor (2005)	Rebelde (Edição Brasil) (2005)

Nuestro Amor Edición Diamante

Singles from Nuestro Amor
- 1. "Nuestro Amor" Released: August 25, 2005; 2. "Aún Hay Algo" Released: November 18, 2005; 3. "Tras De Mí" Released: January 23, 2006; 4. "Este Corazón" Released: March 10, 2006

Professional ratings
Review scores
Source	Rating
AllMusic	link

Nuestro Amor (English: Our Love) is the second studio album by Mexican pop group RBD. It was released on 22 September 2005 in Mexico by EMI and Capitol. The album sold over 127,000 units in its first seven hours of release in the country, and 160,000 in the first week, enough for it to be certified Platinum. It was eventually certified 3× Platinum and Gold in Mexico. In the United States, the album was released on 4 October, and peaked at number 88 on the Billboard 200 chart. It also spent three consecutive weeks at number one on the Top Latin Albums chart, selling over 100,000 units in its first week of release. On March 2, 2006, a "Diamond Edition" of the album was released, which included an interactive CD including wallpapers, videos, screensavers, and two new unreleased tracks. The group eventually recorded a Portuguese-language version of the album for their fanbase in Brazil; this edition was released on May 22, 2006, and was titled Nosso Amor Rebelde. The album was released in Spain on 30 October 2006, and has been certified 2× Platinum. The album was nominated for a Latin Grammy in the "Best Pop Album by a Duo/Group with Vocals" category at the 2006 Latin Grammy Awards.

== Background, release and composition ==
Having released their first live album, Tour Generación RBD En Vivo, on July 19, 2005, the band decided to release their second studio album less than three months later on September 22, 2005, in Mexico and on October 4, 2005, in the United States. On March 2, 2006, a Diamond Edition of the album is released, which includes interactive content and the Portuguese-language song "Quando O Amor Acaba". On May 22, 2006, the Portuguese version of the album is released in Brazil, titled Nosso Amor Rebelde.

Nuestro Amor incorporates pop and Latin pop in its music, with rhythmic and melodic stylings. It was produced by Armando Ávila, Max di Carlo, Carlos Lara and Pedro Damián. Among its tracks, the album contains "Me Voy", a Spanish cover version of "Gone", by American recording artist Kelly Clarkson. "Gone" was originally released on Clarkson's multi-platinum album Breakaway (2004). "Me Voy" keeps the same meaning as the original – a heartbroken woman who gains pride and a sense of self-worth forces herself to get over the one who harmed her. The track "Feliz Cumpleaños" is as well a Spanish cover version, this time of Swedish singer Mikeyla's "Happy Worst Day". Both songs were eventually also recorded in English for RBD's English debut, Rebels (2006), and its Japanese deluxe edition, We Are RBD!.

== Promotion ==
=== Singles ===
"Nuestro Amor" (2005)
The album's lead single.

On 25 August 2005, the first single off the album was released, the title-track "Nuestro Amor". The song was used as the opening theme of the second season of the telenovela Rebelde. The music video for the single was filmed in Pedregal de San Ángel, Mexico and was directed by Amín Azali. The song became RBD's second song to reach the top ten of the Billboard Hot Latin Songs chart in the United States, reaching a peak of No. 6, being the album's highest-charting song in the country.

"Aún Hay Algo" was released as the album's second single on 18 November 2005. In 2006, the song wong the award for "Catchiest Tune" at the 2006 Premios Juventud. The song debuted and peaked at No. 9 on the Billboard Latin Pop Songs chart and at No. 24 on Billboard Hot Latin Songs.

The album's third single was "Tras De Mí", which was released on 23 January 2006. Although the song did not have an accompanying official music video, it was very well accepted among the public. RBD performed the song at the 7th Annual Latin Grammy Awards (2006).

The fourth and last single from the album was the ballad "Este Corazón", which was released on 10 March 2006. The song was used as the opening theme of the third season of Rebelde. The song won the award for "Best Ballad" also at the 2006 Premios Juventud.

=== Tour ===
The album's promotional tour, titled "Tour Generación 2006" or "Nuestro Amor Tour", started on 21 January 2006, at the Pantages Theater in Los Angeles, California and later continued throughout the United States. RBD managed to fill out venues such as the Madison Square Garden in New York City, the American Airlines Arena in Miami, Florida and the Los Angeles Memorial Coliseum. This last particular concert was filmed and broadcast through various television channels in the US.

On 20 September 2006, a promotional leg of the tour, titled "RBD Tour Brasil 2006", visited more than thirteen Brazilian cities. In October 2006, RBD performed in Rio de Janeiro at the Maracanã Stadium to 50,000 fans and became the first Spanish-language musical act to perform a concert as a main act in the history of the stadium. The tour reached its end on 14 March 2007, at the concert performed in Corpus Christi, Texas. That same year, RBD won the award for "Latin Tour of the Year" at the 2007 Latin Billboard Music Awards.

=== Live performances ===
As part of the promotion for Nuestro Amor, RBD presented themselves and performed in a number of outlets in various countries. In 2005, the band first performed on the Mexican TV show Otro Rollo the album's first single and title track "Nuestro Amor". On 13 November they presented a benefit concert in the Estadio Azteca in Mexico, where they performed "Aún hay algo" and "Nuestro Amor". On 17 November the group appeared in "El Evento 40", an event organized by the Mexican radio program Los 40 Principales, which was broadcast through the Ritmoson Latino music channel. On 23 February, they performed "Nuestro Amor" at the 2006 Premios Lo Nuestro and on 13 May, they perform it again at the 24th TVyNovelas Awards.

Later in 2006, the group performed at the Exa TV concert in Monterrey, Mexico and participated on the MTV Latinoamérica program Rock Dinner, of which its premise consists in bringing fans closer to their favorite artists; the group shared an evening with a young Mexican fan and also performed the single "Aún Hay Algo". In the 2006 edition of Walmart Soundcheck, a performance series by the Walmart chain to promote albums being released, the band sang "Tras de Mí", which was the single being promoted at the time. On 11 April 2006 the group again appeared in Otro Rollo, where they now performed "Qué Hay Detrás" and "Este corazón".

In August, RBD appeared on the Chilean program Mekano to perform "Nuestro Amor" and "Aún Hay Algo", then on 1 October they visited Brazil and performed the mentioned tracks on the show Domingo Legal. In late October, the band again performed at an Exa TV concert, but this time in Guadalajara, Mexico, where they sung "Este Corazón" and "Tras De Mí", and other previous tracks.

On 2 November RBD performed "Tras De Mí" at the 7th Annual Latin Grammy Awards. On 14 November the band appeared on the American TV show Don Francisco Presenta, where they performed "Nuestro Amor". On 21 November they again performed in Otro Rollo,singing "Tras De Mí". In December, the group appeared at the Teletón México to perform the album tracks "Así Soy Yo", "A Tu Lado", "Fuera", "Qué Fue Del Amor", "Me Voy" and the singles "Nuestro Amor", "Aún Hay Algo" and "Este Corazón". Lastly, long after the album's promotion ended, on 1 February 2008, the band performed "Nuestro Amor" once more on the festivities prior to the Super Bowl XLII.

== Commercial performance ==
Nuestro Amor garnered great success in North America. The album reached number-one on the Mexican Albums Chart, and was certified platinum only seven hours after being released for sales of over 127,000 copies. Eventually, the album was certified 3× platinum + gold by AMPROFON for sales of 350,000 copies in Mexico. In the United States, the album became RBD's first to reach the number-one spot on the Billboard Top Latin Albums chart, while on the main Billboard 200 albums chart it peaked at No. 88, even higher than their debut, Rebelde. With that, the RIAA granted the album a 2x Latin platinum certification for its sales of 120,000 copies in the country.

In Europe, the album also achieved a welcome reception. Nuestro Amor debuted at No. 6 on the albums chart in Spain, eventually peaking at No. 3 and spending 32 weeks on the chart. That allowed PROMUSICAE to grant the album a 3× platinum certification for sales of 200,000 copies in Spain.

In South and Central America the album was well received since its release. In Brazil, the album reached No. 1 on the Brazilian Albums Chart, where ironically its Portuguese-language version peaked at No. 22 later on. Nuestro Amor was also certified in Costa Rica, where it received a Gold certification for sales of 5,000 copies in the country.

== Track listing ==
Nuestro Amor – Standard edition
No.	Title	Writer(s)	Producer(s)	Length
1.	"Nuestro Amor"	Memo Méndez Guiú; Emil "Billy" Méndez	Armando Ávila	3:34
2.	"Me Voy"	Kara DioGuardi; Mauri Stern	Lara; di Carlo	3:25
3.	"Feliz Cumpleaños"	Jade Ell; Mats Hedström; Lara	Lara; di Carlo	2:58
4.	"Este Corazón"	Armando Ávila	Ávila	3:30
5.	"Así Soy Yo"	Fernando Rojo	Ávila	3:08
6.	"Aún Hay Algo"	Carlos Lara; Max di Carlo (Note: Billed as Karen Sokoloff)	Lara; di Carlo	3:34
7.	"A Tu Lado"	Lara; di Carlo	Lara; di Carlo	3:47
8.	"Fuera"	Mauricio L. Arriaga	Ávila	3:37
9.	"Qué Fue del Amor"	Ávila	Ávila	3:44
10.	"Qué Hay Detrás"	Lara; di Carlo	Lara; di Carlo	3:17
11.	"Tras De Mí"	Lara; di Carlo; Pedro Damián	Lara; di Carlo	3:11
12.	"Solo Para Ti"	Mario Sandoval	Ávila	3:41
13.	"Una Canción – En Directo"	Joe Carvajal (Note: Billed as José Roberto Matera); Johann Daccarett (Note: Billed as CJ Turbay Daccarett)	Ávila	3:43
14.	"Liso, Sensual (Note: Originally released on their live album, Tour Generación RBD En Vivo.)"	Lynda Thomas (Note: Billed as Polen Thomas); di Carlo	Lara; di Carlo	3:10
15.	"Nuestro Amor" (Video)			3:35
Total length:				48:24

Nuestro Amor – Edición Diamante (bonus disc)
No.	Title	Writer(s)	Producer(s)	Length
1.	"Quando o Amor Acaba"	José Manuel Pérez Marino; Cláudio Rabello	Lara; di Carlo	3:19
2.	"Una Canción" (Studio Version)	Carvajal; Daccarett		3:27
Total length:				55:26

Nuestro Amor – Edición Diamante (Enhanced content)
No.	Title	Length
1.	"Emoticons"
2.	"Photo Gallery"
3.	"Game"
4.	"Aún Hay Algo" (Music video)
5.	"Screensavers"
6.	"Wallpapers"

== Personnel ==
Credits adapted from the album's liner notes.

Recorded locations

- Los Angeles, California (at The Box)
- Mexico City, Mexico (at Cosmos Studios México)
- Mixtlán, Mexico

Mixed in

- Los Angeles, California (at The Box)

Vocals

- RBD – all vocals
- Lynda Thomas (Note: Billed as Clair Gómez) – additional chorus vocals
- Guido Laris (Note: Billed as Pepe Garza) – additional chorus vocals

Musicians

- Armando Ávila – all instruments
- Migliano Paglinio – bass guitar
- Kyle Sokoloff – drums
- Javier Calderón – guitars (solo in "Nuestro Amor"), Gibby Tyler, Max di Carlo
- Max di Carlo – keyboards

Production

- Camilo Lara – A&R, executive producer
- Melissa Mochulske – A&R coordination
- Armando Ávila – arrangement, mixing, producer, recording, vocal direction
- Güido Laris – arrangement, recording, vocal direction
- Carlos Lara – arrangement, chorus arrangement, music direction, producer
- Max di Carlo – arrangement, music direction, producer, programming
- René Cárdenas – engineer
- Migliano Paglinio – engineer
- Pedro Damián – executive producer
- Luis Luisillo Miguel – associate producer
- Emilio Ávila – executive musical producer
- hulahula.com.mx – graphic design
- OM Entertainment – management
- Marisol Alcelay – marketing, product manager
- Rodolfo Vázquez mastering
- Juan Carlos Moguel – mixing, recording, vocal direction
- Kitaro Mizei – mixing
- Amín Azali – music video director ("Nuestro Amor", for Topfilms Productions)
- Olga Laris – photographer
- Jorge González – production assistant
- Jorge González Montaut – production coordinator
- Carolina Palomo Ramos – production coordinator
- Carlos Valdés – recording, vocal direction
- Michkin Boyzo – recording, vocal direction
- Andrew Rose – recording assistant
- Iván Machorro – vocal direction assistant

== Accolades ==
Year	Ceremony	Award	Result
2006	7th Annual Latin Grammy Awards	Best Pop Album by a Duo or Group with Vocals	Nominated
2006	Billboard Latin Music Awards	Latin Pop Album of the Year, New Artist	Nominated
2006	Billboard Latin Music Awards	Latin Pop Album of the Year – Duo or Group	Nominated
2006	Premios Oye!	Pop Album of the Year – Duo or Group	Nominated
2006	Premios Juventud	CD to Die For	Won
2007	Premios Lo Nuestro	Latin Pop Album of the Year – Duo or Group	Won

== Charts ==
=== Weekly charts ===
Chart	Peak Position
Brazilian Albums Chart	1
Mexican Albums Chart	1
Spain Albums Chart	3
US Billboard 200	88
US Billboard Top Latin Albums	1
US Billboard Latin Pop Albums	1
Venezuelan Albums Chart	1

=== Year-end charts ===
Charts (2005–2007)	Peak Position
Brazilian Albums Chart	3
Spain Albums Chart (2006)	15
Spain Albums Chart (2007)	32
US Billboard Top Latin Albums	4
US Billboard Latin Pop Albums	1

== Certifications and sales ==
Region	Certification	Certified units/sales
Brazil (Pro-Música Brasil)	2× Platinum	271,000
Chile (IFPI)	Gold	
Colombia (ASINCOL)	3× Platinum	
Costa Rica	Gold	
Mexico (AMPROFON)	3× Platinum+Gold	350,000^{^}
Romania (UFPR)	Gold	
Spain (Promusicae)	2× Platinum	160,000^{^}
United States (RIAA)	2× Platinum (Latin)	200,000^{^}
^{^} Shipments figures based on certification alone.

== Release history ==
Region	Date	Format	Label
Mexico	22 September 2005	CD, digital download	EMI
Worldwide	4 October 2005	CD, digital download	EMI
Worldwide	2 March 2006	'Edición Diamante' – CD, digital download	EMI
Mexico Brazil	16 March 2023	LP	Universal

== See also ==
- List of certified albums in Romania
