= Mikeyla =

Swedish singer

Mikeyla (full name Mikaela Pettersson) is a Swedish singer.

She was born and raised on the island of Sturkö, outside Karlskrona in Blekinge. She participated in the 2005 Fame Factory. She has so far released one album, Something Like That, and a single with The Metal Forces called "Glorious".

Her music is mostly of the rock-chick style, with a few more poppy songs such as "Just A Girl".
