= Omelete =

Brazilian entertainment news website

- Website type: Online media, movie theatre information and review aggregator
- Headquarters: São Paulo, Brazil
- Owners: Omelete&CO
- Website: www.omelete.com.br
- Commercial: Yes
- Registration: Free/subscription
- Launched: June 20, 2000; 26 years ago
- Current status: Online

Omelete is a Brazilian entertainment website created in 2000 by Érico Borgo, Marcelo Forlani and Marcelo Hessel that covers some subjects of pop culture such as movies, comics, music, television and video games.

== History ==
In June 2000, Érico Borgo, Marcelo Forlani and Marcelo Hessel created Omelete. The content of website was initially dedicated to the fans of comics, but the site grew up and in 2007 had an estimate of 120,000 visits per day. In 2007, it released a press magazine and the OmeleTV, initially named Omeletevê, which consisted of a videocast with interviews and news recorded by the editors of the site. The first video was an interview with comedian Jerry Seinfeld.

Two years later, Omelete released Almanaque do Cinema, a cine almanac that was published by Ediouro and written by Marcelo Forlani, Marcelo Hessel and Érico Borgo.

In 2017 Omelete launched a gaming website called TheEnemy.

The Comic Con Experience, a comic and multi-genre convention created in 2014 and inspired by San Diego Comic-Con, is organized by Omelete along with comics publisher Chiaroscuro Studios and toy company Piziitoys, and held yearly in either São Paulo or Cologne, Germany. In 2021, the CCXP Awards were first held.
