= RBD =

Mexican group

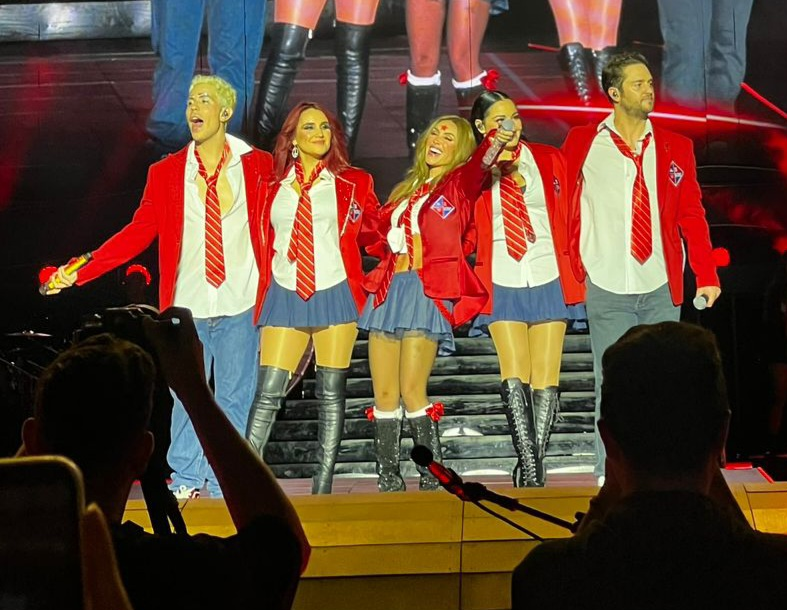
- RBD performing in Rio de Janeiro in 2023; L–R: Christian Chávez, Dulce María, Anahí, Maite Perroni and Christopher von Uckermann

Background information
- Origin: Mexico City, Mexico
- Genres: Latin pop; teen pop; pop rock
- Works: Discography; songs
- Years active: 2004–2009; 2020–2023
- Labels: EMI; Capitol; Televisa; Virgin; Universal
- Past members: Alfonso Herrera; Anahí; Christian Chávez; Christopher von Uckermann; Dulce María; Maite Perroni
- Website: soyrebelde.world

RBD was a Mexican pop vocal group that gained popularity from Televisa's telenovela Rebelde (2004–2006). It was composed of Anahí, Dulce María, Maite Perroni, Alfonso Herrera, Christopher von Uckermann and Christian Chávez. The group achieved international success from 2004 until their separation in 2009 and sold over 15 million records worldwide, making them one of the best-selling Latin music artists of all time.

In November 2004, the group released their debut studio album, Rebelde, to mainstream success. In September 2005, the group released their second album, Nuestro Amor, receiving their first Latin Grammy Award nomination at the 2006 ceremony. In 2006, the group released their third album, Celestial; this was their first album to be released simultaneously in all countries. The album's lead single, "Ser o Parecer", topped the Billboard Hot Latin Songs chart for two consecutive weeks. In the same year, the group released their fourth album, and first English-language project titled Rebels. In 2007, the group released their fifth album Empezar Desde Cero, which was nominated at the Latin Grammy Awards. In 2009, the group released their sixth and final album, Para Olvidarte De Mí.

RBD officially formed on 30 October 2004, and announced on 15 August 2008, through a press release, that they would disband on 10 March 2009. In September 2020, the band announced they would reunite through a virtual show in December, and their music was released on digital platforms the same month. Four of the original members returned: Anahí, Perroni, Uckermann and Chávez. Over two years later, on 19 January 2023, they announced that all members would return for a one-off tour, titled Soy Rebelde Tour, with the exception of Herrera.

== History ==
=== 2004–2005: Rebelde and Nuestro Amor ===
"Rebelde" (2004)
Debut and lead single from the album Rebelde.

RBD (abbreviation for "ReBelDe" • English: Rebel) was formed on 30 October 2004, following the premiere of Mexican soap opera Rebelde (produced by Pedro Damian and adapted from the original Argentinian creation of Cris Morena's Rebelde Way). The members were Anahí, Alfonso Herrera, Dulce María, Christopher von Uckermann, Maite Perroni and Christian Chávez. The band released their debut single, "Rebelde", one month before the group officially formed, on 30 September. Their debut album of the same name was released on 11 November 2004, by EMI. All four singles from the album were number-one hits in Mexico.

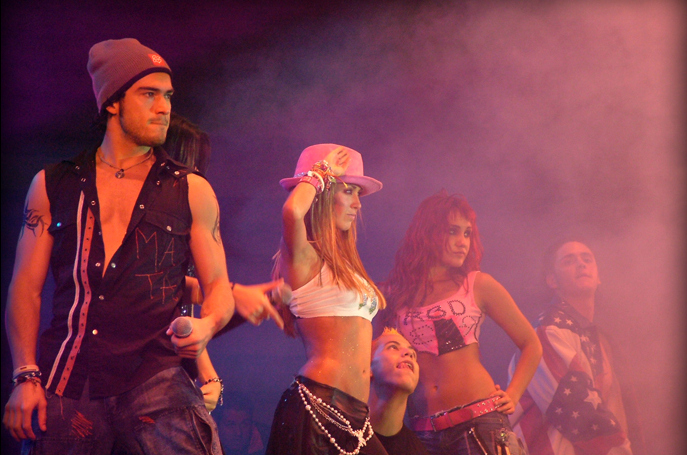
The band performing in Tijuana during Tour Generación RBD in 2005.

Rebelde sold well in the United States, reaching number 95 on the Billboard 200 and number two on the Latin Albums chart. In July 2005, a live CD/DVD, Tour Generación RBD En Vivo, was released. The CD/DVD documented their tour around Mexico that included 45 sold-out concerts across the country, including sixteen in Mexico City. In Spain, Rebelde spent five weeks on the top of the charts and was certified 3× Platinum for having sold over 240,000 copies.

With the success of the telenovela, the group used the hiatus between the first and second season to release their second album, Nuestro Amor, on 22 September 2005. This album included twelve songs, plus "Una Canción", a live recording, and "Liso, Sensual", a studio version of a song previously performed on their last tour. The album set record sales in Mexico, selling 127,000 copies on its release day and 160,000 copies in its first week. In the U.S., the album topped the Latin Albums chart for three weeks and peaked at number 88 on the Billboard 200. The four singles reached number one in Mexico. In the U.S., "Nuestro Amor", "Aún hay algo" and "Este corazón" charted on the Hot Latin Songs chart at numbers six, 24 and 10, respectively. Nuestro Amor was certified 2× Platinum in Spain. In November 2005, a Portuguese version of their debut album was released, titled Rebelde (Edição Brasil).

=== 2006–2007: Celestial and Rebels ===
In early 2006, the group went on tour across the United States for the first time, which was recorded and released as a CD/DVD in April 2006, titled Live in Hollywood. It peaked at number six on the Latin Albums chart. Since that year, former singer Lynda Thomas, who had been uncredited with the group since their debut, officially became a recurring contributor for them. The first song credited to her was "No Pares", performed by Dulce María.

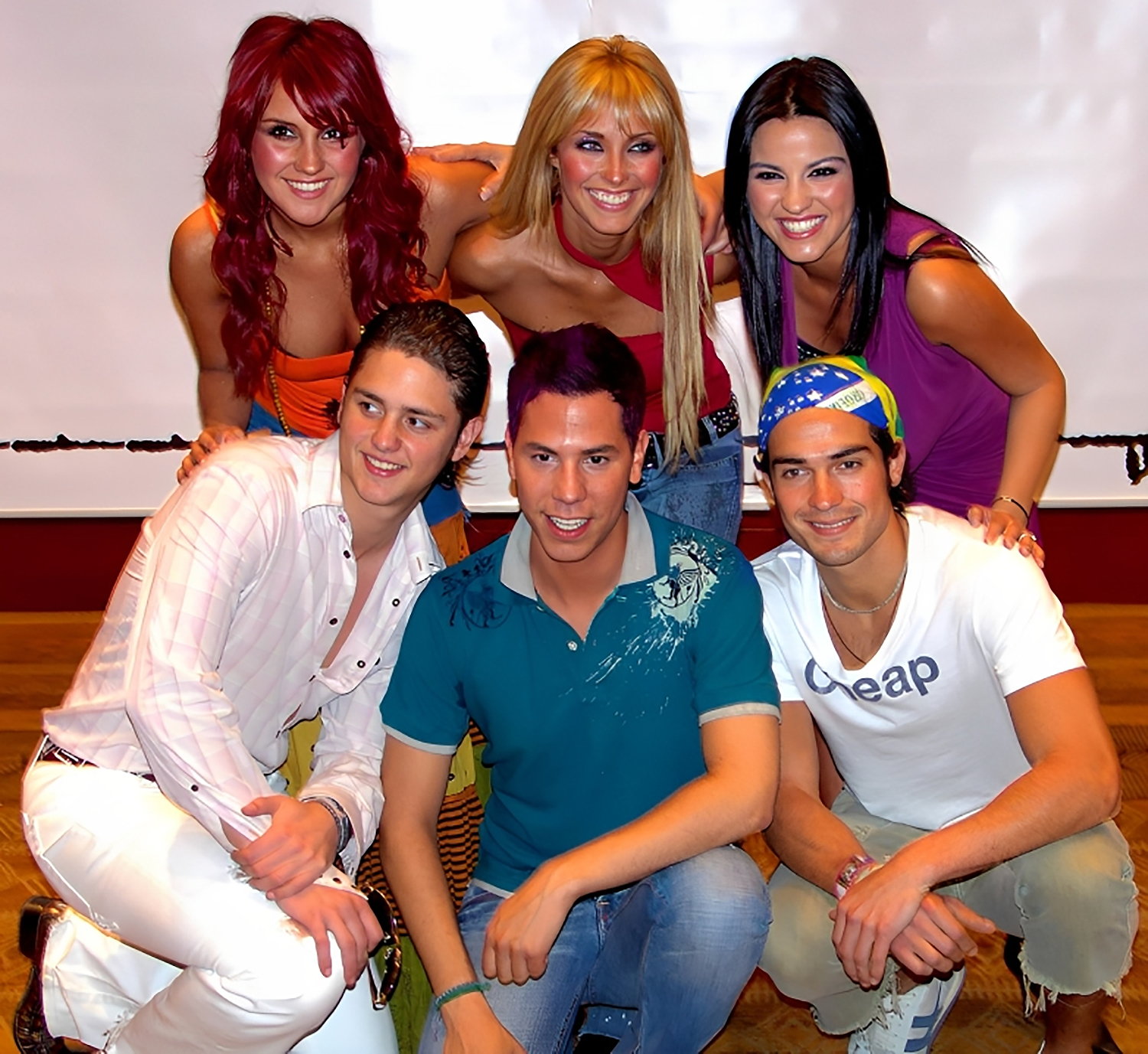
RBD in Brazil during February 2006.

In May 2006, the group released a Portuguese-language version of Nuestro Amor, titled Nosso Amor Rebelde, targeted for the Brazilian market. Nosso Amor Rebelde is their second album in Portuguese, released only in Brazil. The album contains Portuguese versions of 11 songs from Nuestro Amor. The album, however, did not have a full week of album sales because of its Friday release. Despite this, it became their first album to peak or chart in the top 20 of the Billboard 200. RBD was nominated for the Latin Grammy Awards in 2006 in the category Best Pop Album by a Group or Duo for Nuestro Amor. They performed a new version of "Tras de mí" at the ceremony.

"Ser o Parecer"

"Tu Amor"

In November 2006, the group released their third album, Celestial, produced and directed by Carlos Lara and Armando Ávila. The album debuted at number 15 on the Billboard 200 with over 137,000 copies sold in the United States in its first week. The album spawned three hit singles, "Ser o Parecer", "Celestial" and "Bésame sin miedo". In Spain, Celestial was certified Platinum.

One month later, in December 2006 a Portuguese-language edition of the album was released for the Brazilian market called Celestial (Versão Brasil). This third album in Portuguese was the first to be recorded in Brazil. From their tour in Brazil, the group released a DVD titled Live in Rio (2007). The group were also honored for selling over 2.5 million copies of their albums and DVD's in the country. That same month, the group released their fourth album and first English-language album, Rebels, which debuted at number 40 on the Billboard 200 with 94,000 copies sold in its first week. Rebels was certified Gold in Japan for having sold over 250,000 copies.

The group was nominated twice in the category "Latin Pop Album of the Year By a Duo or Group", with Celestial and Live in Hollywood. They also received a nomination for "Top Latin Albums Artist of the Year" and "Latin Tour of the Year" for Tour Generación RBD. The show was held on 26 April in Miami, Florida. They won in all categories they were nominated in. Celestial won the former award.

=== 2008–2009: Empezar Desde Cero and Para Olvidarte De Mí ===
On 2 March 2007, Chávez revealed he is gay after pictures were discovered of him marrying another man in Canada. In a letter on the group's website, he asked fans for understanding and acceptance. After this, the group worked two side-projects; Sálvame, an organization that helps homeless youth get an education and shelter, and RBD: La Familia, their new sitcom. The group was nominated four times in three categories for the 2007 Billboard Latin Music Awards.

In early 2007, the group began to rehearse for their upcoming concert tour called Tour Celestial, which started in Ecuador on 20 April 2007. On 28 May 2007, Donald Trump invited the group to perform three songs at the Miss Universe 2007 finals in Mexico City. They performed a medley of "Wanna Play", "Cariño Mio" and "Money Money" at the event. In June 2007, the group recorded the accompanying music video for their single "Bésame sin miedo" in Transylvania while on tour in Romania where Celestial was released. It was the same year they were chosen to headline a series of Pepsi commercials with The Black Eyed Peas to air in South America and Spanish-speaking countries. On 19 July 2007, the group performed "Bésame sin miedo" at the Premios Juventud 2007 ceremony and won seven awards that night, including "Voice of the Moment" and "Favorite Concert". RBD broke the record for most albums in the top 20 in Brazil, having three different albums in the top 20 for the week ending 20 January 2007. Their single "Tu amor" was nominated for Best International Song in France. In an interview in Mexico, Christopher von Uckermann stated that it has always been an honor to be compared to Menudo and Timbiriche, but mentioned that RBD surpassed those groups by accomplishing much more in only five years, being the only Mexican group to gain worldwide fame.

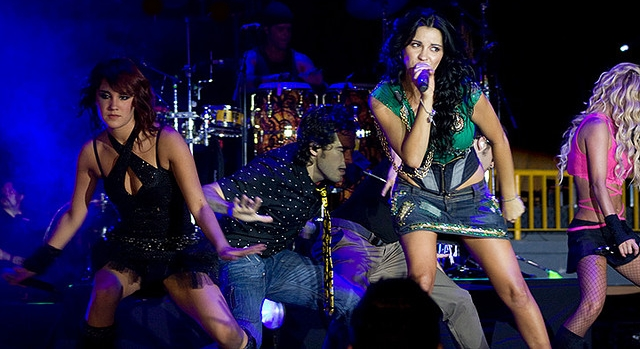
RBD during the Empezar Desde Cero World Tour in 2008.

The first worldwide "RBD Day" was held on 4 October 2007. The group celebrated the day with fans in Houston, Texas. During their press conference, they confirmed that their fifth album would be titled Empezar Desde Cero, produced by Carlos Lara and Armando Ávila. The first single from Empezar Desde Cero, "Inalcanzable", debuted in October 2007 and peaked at number two on Mexican charts. Empezar Desde Cero was released on 20 November, debuting at number one on the Billboard Latin Albums chart and peaking within the top-ten in a variety of countries such as Brazil (their first album that did not top the charts in that country, peaking at number three) and Mexico. As of November 2008, Empezar Desde Cero had sold over a million copies worldwide. It was voted by Billboard readers as the third best album released in 2007.

In April 2008, the group performed at a concert in Brazil's capital city. The free concert was held at the city's main park and had 500,000 fans in attendance. RBD was said to be the first music act in the history of Slovenia charts to have six different albums in the top ten in the same weekend. In August 2008, the 2008 Latin Grammy nominations were announced; the group was nominated for Best Pop Album By a Duo or Group with Vocals for Empezar Desde Cero. On 14 August 2008, they released a compilation album of their greatest hits titled RBD The Best Of.

On 15 August 2008, the group announced through a press release that they would disband in 2009. The group's manager, Pedro Damián, explained that although there weren't any fights among the members, it was best that they should disband for the ones who were already planning different solo activities. Herrera and Perroni were occupied with their television projects (the former with the TV series Terminales, and the latter as the protagonist of Cuidado Con El Ángel). Chávez was in the middle of a tour with the musical Avenue Q's Mexican stage production, and was planning to build his career as a solo artist, actor and producer. Anahí managed her own clothing store in Mexico City and began an organization to help those who have eating disorders. Dulce María was involved with shooting a film Alguién a visto a Lupita and a variety of projects, such as dubbing a cartoon character in a Mexican film. Later, Uckermann starred in the TV show Kdabra, produced by Fox in Colombia. On 25 November, RBD released Best Of (in Brazil: Hits Em Português; in the United States: Greatest Hits), which was a CD/DVD that features their singles and a DVD with music videos as part of their goodbye.

Para Olvidarte De Mí (2009) was the sixth and final album to be released by the group. The album is preceded by the only single "Para Olvidarte De Mí". On 2 December 2009, the live concert DVD, Tournée do Adeus, recorded in São Paulo was released, containing the group's last show in Brazil.

=== 2020: Social networks, streaming relaunch and Ser O Parecer Virtual Concert ===
After years with the music of RBD out of online streaming platforms (after Universal Music bought EMI), in August 2020 the former members announced on their social media that their six studio albums and the Brazilian versions would be available in all streaming services on 3 September 2020. It was also announced that the albums will be available in stores.

To celebrate the launch of their music on streaming, the group announced a virtual show that took place on 26 December and reunited 4 of the original members: Anahí, Maite Perroni, Christian Chávez and Christopher von Uckermann. Alfonso Herrera and Dulce Maria did not take part in the reunion, with the latter confirming that she couldn't join because of her pregnancy.

A week of snippets on the band's Instagram account teasing a new song followed soon after. On Tuesday, 17 November "Siempre He Estado Aquí" was released simultaneously in all streaming platforms. The group created a TikTok challenge for the song. An animated music video was released on 3 December on the group's YouTube channel.

=== 2023: Soy Rebelde Tour ===
On 14 December 2022, von Uckermann archived all of his Instagram posts and deleted his profile picture, with no explanation. A day later, Chávez did the same thing, leading fans to speculate things related to the group. That same day, fans noticed María was beginning to archive posts and found a Brazilian ticket website with a page for RBD. Soon after, Puente archived all her posts and also removed her profile picture. She was followed by the group's official account, which did the same thing. The next day, Perroni cleansed her own Instagram page, and María finished the day after. The page T6H Entertainment also took part in this blackout.

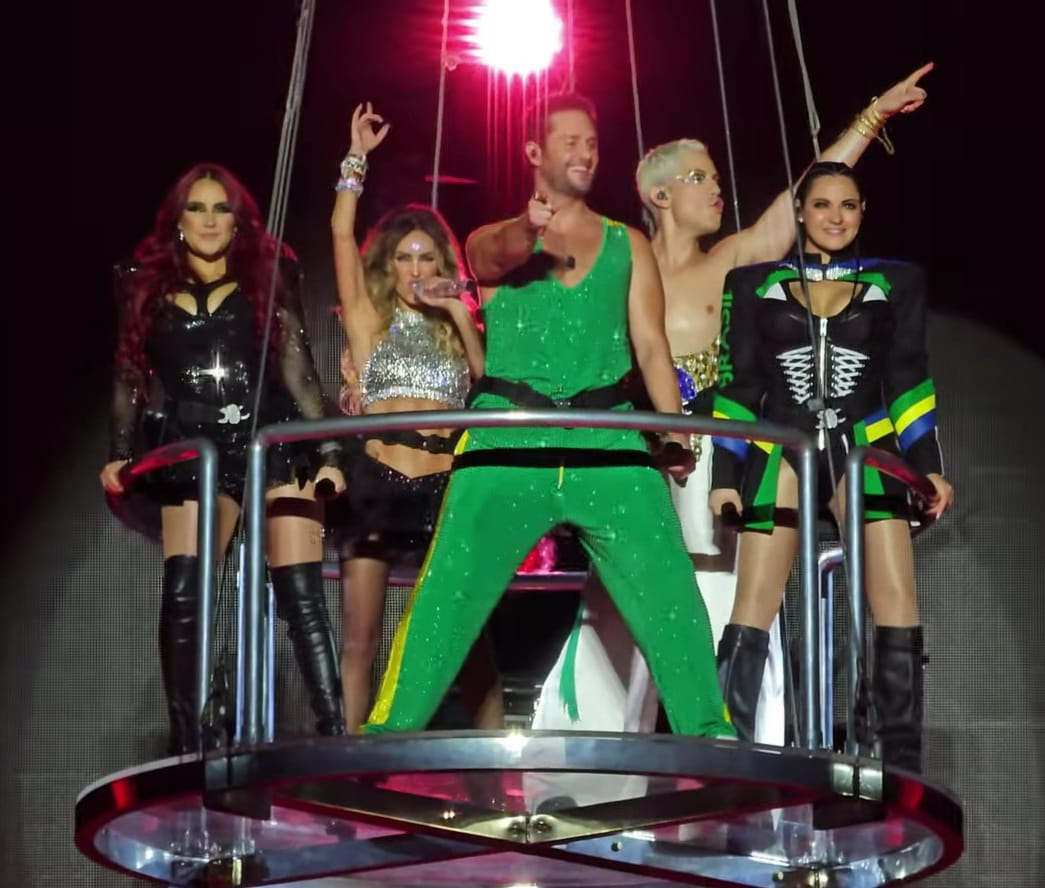
RBD performing in Rio de Janeiro on 9 November 2023 on the Soy Rebelde Tour.

On 19 December, the band's Instagram account posted a video that included a scene from the telenovela Rebelde, intercut with footage of the five members during a dinner at Puente's house from 20 November. The end of the video showed a link called "soyrebelde.mundo", where fans could register and included a countdown to 19 January 2023, with the text "Prepare your ties" written above. On the scheduled date, a 3-minute video confirming their Soy Rebelde reunion tour was displayed in public spaces in cities such as Los Angeles, New York City, Chicago, São Paulo, Rio de Janeiro and Mexico City, where fans gathered to witness the announcement. Titled Soy Rebelde Tour, it initially comprised 26 dates and was scheduled to begin on 25 August 2023, from El Paso and continue throughout the U.S, Brazil and Mexico, ending on 2 December 2023, in Mexico City.

Due to its success and demand, additional dates were added in several cities including Los Angeles, Miami and New York City right after, and four new shows were added in Medellín in Colombia in February. The tour broke several records, including having the most shows at the Foro Sol in Mexico City, a record previously held by Puerto Rican rappers Daddy Yankee and Bad Bunny. The concert series was completely sold out, with both the original dates and the added shows. More shows were added later, with the final date now being on 21 December, at the Estadio Azteca. The tour began on 25 August, at El Paso, Texas, at the Sun Bowl Stadium.

== Members ==
- Anahí – (2004–2009, 2020-2023)
- Christian Chávez – (2004–2009, 2020-2023)
- Maite Perroni – (2004–2009, 2020-2023)
- Christopher von Uckermann – (2004–2009, 2020-2023)
- Dulce María – (2004–2009, 2023)
- Alfonso Herrera – (2004–2009)

== Discography ==
=== Spanish discography ===
Studio albums

- Rebelde (2004)
- Nuestro Amor (2005)
- Celestial (2006)
- Empezar Desde Cero (2007)
- Para Olvidarte de Mí (2009)

=== Bilingual discography ===
Studio albums

- Rebelde (Edição Brasil) (2005)
- Nosso Amor Rebelde (2006)
- Celestial (Versão Brasil) (2006)
- Rebels (2006)

== Filmography ==
=== Television ===
Year	Name	Role	Notes
2004-06	Rebelde	Main Cast	The group was created during production
2007	RBD: La familia	Main Cast	Fictionalized series about the group members; 13 episodes
2007	Lola, érase una vez	Themselves; special guest role	Episode 137; Perroni was also called "Cinderella" during the episode

=== Film ===
Year	Name	Role	Notes
2006	¿Que Hay Detrás de RBD?	Themselves	Documentary
2020	Ser O Parecer: The Global Virtual Union	Themselves	Streamed concert; María and Herrera appear through archival footage
2023	Por Siempre RBD	Themselves	Concert film; Herrera did not participate

== Tours ==
- Tour Generación RBD (2005–07)
- Celestial Tour (2007)
- Empezar Desde Cero Tour (2008)
- Tour del Adiós (2008)
- Soy Rebelde Tour (2023)

=== 2005–07: Tour Generación RBD ===
Tour Generación RBD was the group's first national tour, which had 80 sold-out shows in Mexico. They visited Monterrey three times, which gathered over 150,000 fans. The tour was certified by OCESA as the fourth most rapidly sold-out tour in Mexico, behind The Cure's 2004 Sing to the Deadly Mouse Trap Tour, Britney Spears' 2002 Dream Within a Dream Tour, and Backstreet Boys' 2001 Black & Blue World Tour. The tour began on 13 May 2005, in Toluca, Mexico, and ended on 18 December 2005, in Lima, Peru. RBD's first international concerts took place in Colombia with huge success. They performed first at Medellin in front of a crowd of 30,000; later in Cali, over 50,000 were in attendance, being the group's most attended concert in Colombia, and later in Bogota.

In January 2006, the Tour Generación RBD 2006 started in the United States, at the Los Angeles Memorial Coliseum with a crowd of over 68,000 fans – a record-breaking act for a Latin group and a sign of their widespread success. In 2006, 694,655 tickets were sold accounting for North American shows, worth a total of $23,600,000. 749,485 tickets were sold worldwide as they came in as the 14th top-selling act of 2006 worldwide.

=== 2007–08: Tour Celestial ===
Tour Celestial is RBD's third tour where they performed in Latin America, the U.S., and Europe. On 22 June 2007, RBD filmed their concert in Madrid, Spain with over 40,000 fans in attendance for their DVD called Tour Celestial 2007: Hecho en España.

In early October, it was confirmed by Roptus.com that the rest of the tour would be postponed until further notice. The reason the website gave for these actions was that RBD wants to give their audience a much well-deserved show by performing some songs off their new album, Empezar desde Cero, which was released on 20 November 2007. RBD grossed $5,400,000 on North American shows and a combined total of 293,742 tickets worldwide.

=== 2008: Empezar Desde Cero World Tour ===
In February 2008, the Empezar Desde Cero Tour (English: "Start From Zero" Tour) began in Hildalgo, Texas, at the Dodge Arena. In late 2007, their Celestial Tour planned for the United States was rescheduled to February 2008, thus becoming part of the newly renamed tour, Empezar Desde Cero Tour. Timbiriche was their opening act in the U.S. The tour took RBD to places including Argentina, Brazil, Chile, the Dominican Republic, México, Paraguay, Serbia, Spain, Romania, and the U.S., among many more countries across South America and Europe. RBD performed in Brazil for over 500,000 people, breaking the record by the Rolling Stones. In September, they did a series of concerts in Slovenia. The first concert was sold out in 30 minutes, which broke records for a Spanish-language group in the country. Pollstar named RBD among the top 100 best-selling groups for mid-2008, coming in at #49, with 166,839 tickets sold between 1 January – 30 June 2008. Third-quarter sales, as indicated by Pollstar, ranked RBD at #48 out of 100, with 301,015 tickets sold from 1 January to 30 September; year-end sales, for the entire year, indicated that the group sold 367,346 tickets during the tour and earned $4.4 million in ticket sales from their North American shows, alone.

=== 2008: Tour del Adiós ===
The Tour del Adiós was a world tour by Mexican group RBD. The tour was set to visit South America, North America, and Europe, which began on 1 November 2008, and ended on 21 December 2008.

On 14 August 2008, the group RBD announced their last tour, named Tour del Adiós (or Gira Del Adiós). The tour initially included about 20 cities in countries such as Argentina, Colombia, Venezuela, Ecuador, Paraguay, Chile and Brazil. In November 2008, the group began the tour in the following cities: La Paz, Buenos Aires, Córdoba and Rosario. In December, RBD concerts were held in Los Angeles, Guayaquil, Quito, Lima, Santiago, Ljubljana, Bucharest, Belgrade and Madrid. The last presentation of Tour del Adiós was on 21 December, in Madrid.

In Brazil, the tour was called "Turnê do Adeus". The first five presentations in the country were held soon after their shows in Argentina. They held performances in Fortaleza, Porto Alegre, Rio de Janeiro with 30,000 people and more than 25,000 in São Paulo (where they recorded their last live DVD, entitled Tournée do Adeus) and Brasília.

=== 2023: Soy Rebelde Tour ===
The Soy Rebelde Tour started in El Paso, Texas on 25 August 2023, and included 30 shows across the United States. They ended their U.S. leg on 22 October 2023. After an outpouring of demand from fans in Colombia, RBD announced two dates in Medellín on 3 and 4 November at the Estadio Atanasio Girardot. After the two dates were sold out, a third and fourth date were also added. The group performed eight dates in Brazil, with two in Rio de Janeiro at the Estádio Olímpico Nilton Santos, and the rest in São Paulo, with the first two at the Estádio do Morumbi with the latter six at the Allianz Parque. The band performed 12 dates in Mexico, with the first two at the Estadio Mobil Super in Monterrey, two at the Estadio Tres de Marzo in Zapopan, four at the Foro Sol in Mexico City, followed by a return to Monterrey, then back to Mexico City for two more dates at the Foro Sol. The tour concluded on 21 December at the Estadio Azteca, exactly 15 years after their last show in 2008.

== Legacy ==
RBD was one of the most important phenomenons of Latin pop culture in the 2000s despite their short transition into the music scene. The cultural phenomenon led by the soap opera Rebelde and the pop group, accompanied by advertising strategies from 2004 to 2009, resulted in recognition from a young audience who followed the career of the group, leaving a legacy of six studio albums, two TV series and multiple awards. On 2 March 2007, photos of Chávez marrying a Canadian BJ Murphy were leaked, and the singer spoke about this in a statement, officially coming out. He became the first openly gay Mexican international singer. 4 October was selected as RBD World Day, in honor of the day Rebelde was released in Mexico.

== Fundación Sálvame ==
In February 2006, thousands of RBD fans in Brazil attended an event where the six members signed merchandise and performed some of their songs. After the event concluded, a white van that was thought to contain the group was spotted leaving the area. Due to this, thousands of people ran in excitement and in the commotion, 43 people were injured and three others were killed. Later during their Celestial tour, the group spoke about the incident and stated "It is something that struck us all. No one would tell us what happened until we were on our way back to Mexico, and to know that your fans were killed at your event is a horrible feeling because you think 'Wow, they were there to see me and because of that they’re gone now' it’s such an indescribable feeling and we can’t explain how heartbroken we are". The group later confirmed they had met and spoken with the families of the victims.

RBD launched "Fundación Sálvame" ("Save Me Foundation", named after one of their songs) to help street children, which began on 1 May 2006. The foundation serves Mexico, Brazil, and Spain.

== See also ==
- List of highest-grossing concert tours by Latin artists
- List of most-attended concert tours
- List of music artists and bands from Mexico
- List of number-one Billboard Hot Latin Pop Airplay of 2005
- List of number-one Billboard Hot Latin Pop Airplay of 2006
- List of number-one Billboard Hot Latin Songs of 2006
- List of number-one Billboard Latin Pop Albums from the 2000s
- List of number-one Billboard Top Latin Albums of 2005
- List of number-one Billboard Top Latin Albums of 2006
- List of number-one Billboard Top Latin Albums of 2007
- List of Latin songs on the Billboard Hot 100
- List of best-selling albums in Brazil
- List of best-selling albums in Mexico
- List of best-selling Latin music artists
- List of number-one albums of 2005 (Mexico)
- Top Latin Albums Year-End Chart
- Top 100 Mexico
