= Lynda Thomas =

Mexican singer

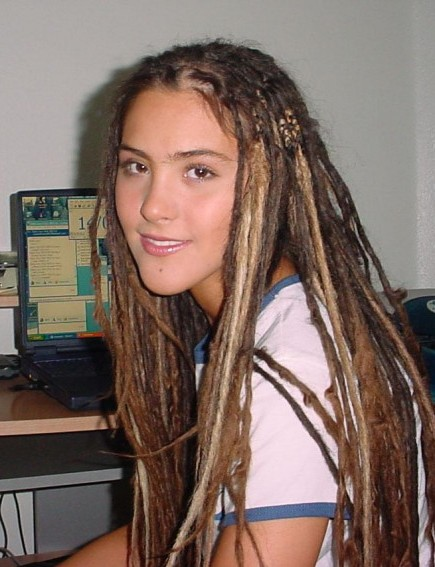
- Thomas in July 2003
- Born: Lynda Aguirre Thomas; 21 December 1981 (age 44); Tijuana, Baja California, Mexico
- Other name: Lynda
- Occupations: Musician; singer; songwriter; activist
- Years active: 1994–2002; 2018–present
- Spouse: Carlos Lara
- Children: 1
- Musical career
- Genres: Pop rock; dance-pop; Eurodance
- Instruments: E-mu Emulator; guitar
- Labels: EMI (IberoAmerica); Capitol (United States); Universal (Europe)

Lynda Aguirre Thomas (born 21 December 1981), known professionally as Lynda, is a Mexican musician, singer, songwriter and activist. She achieved recognition in her native Mexico during the late 1990s and early 2000s. She was signed to EMI Capitol Records and released four studio albums. Her last album, Polen, was released in 2001 and she retired shortly afterwards.

== Early life and musical debut ==
Thomas was born in Tijuana, Baja California, Mexico. In 1989, she took part in the TV singing contest Fantasía Musical featured in Siempre en Domingo. Soon after, she moved to Mexico City and was supported by her sister Alissa (Rosangel), Carlos Lara and Tino Geiser.

== Career ==
=== 1994–1998: Early years and debut album ===
In 1994, Thomas signed with EMI-Capitol. In 1995, at the age of 14, Thomas recorded her debut album Lynda, which was officially released in early 1996. It contained the singles "Inseparables" and "Gira Que Gira", which became the commercial breakout of the album. Soon after, Thomas released the single "Blue Jeans". She continued her studies during her early career. She also released the single "El Amor No Tiene Edad" (Love Has No Age). At the age of 15, she received the "Revelation Artist" award by Televisa.

In 1997, at the age of 16, Thomas released the album, Un Grito En El Corazón. the first single taken from the album was "Dile" (Tell Him). Thomas was commissioned to record the music for the 1997 Ringling Bros. and Barnum & Bailey Circus tour through the Americas, and performed live on selected dates. In December 1997, Thomas released a dance version of Jingle Bells.

Later, in January 1998, she was involved in a homage to Pope John Paul II alongside other singers, the song was "Pescador Juan Pablo II", and received the Medal of Merit from Vatican.

=== 1998–2000: Independencia ===
In early 1998, Thomas moved to Los Angeles, California, to begin recording Mi Día de la Independencia, alongside her producers Carlos Lara and Max di Carlo, it was finished recording in late 1998; the album was released around the world in early 1999, as Thomas turned 18. Thomas first released the single "No Quiero Verte", (I Don't Wanna See You), an alternative rock track. Her second physical single was "Maldita Timidez" (Damn Shyness), it was her second consecutive Ibero-American No. 1 of 1999; the music video, which featured actor Héctor Arredondo in his first professional acting work. "Corazón Perdido" (Lost Heart), was the last single from the 1990s released by Thomas. Subsequently, in early 2000, the musician released officially the acoustic ballad "Ahí Estaré" (I'll Be There); first, the studio version won significant airplay on the radio in 1999. She also worked for the TV ad campaign of Sabritas snacks company, with an adaptation of her successful single "Corazón Perdido".

In July 2000, Thomas released the song "A 1000 X Hora" (A Thousand Per Hour) in 12" inch and EP formats; it was written by Thomas about her eating and mental disorders; She recorded the title track for the telenovela Primer Amor: A mil por hora. Thomas also performed at the 2000 Chilean telethon, held at Estadio Nacional in Santiago de Chile.

=== 2001–2002: Polen ===
In April 2001, Thomas released the last album in her career, "Polen", when she was 20 years old. Before the official release of Polen, on Sunday, February 25, 2001, Thomas performed 3 songs at Festival de Viña Del Mar held in Chile. The first single taken from Polen was the alternative track "Lo Mejor de Mí" (The Best Of Me). Meanwhile, Thomas hosted alongside Colombian rock-singer Juanes in the first original edition of the Nickelodeon Kids' Choice Awards Latin America, held in Santa Monica, California, in 2001.

==== Last days in the music industry - "Ay, Ay, Ay" - "Amar Así" ====
In November 2001, Thomas released at the request of her record label the teen pop-punk single "Mala Leche" ("Bad Milk"), in Spain, Argentina and Chile; for the song, Thomas recorded the last music video in her career. On April 11 and 23, 2002 the studio album Polen was remastered and re-released only in the United States to increase the popularity of the album; it coincided with the American Nickelodeon Kids' Choice Awards show hosted by Thomas for the IberoAmerican broadcasting, in which she conducted interviews with several actors and music groups of that time including Jennifer Love Hewitt, Mike Myers, Dana Carvey, O-Town, No Secrets, Antonio Banderas, Melanie Griffith or Ashley Judd among others. She also released the last official single in her career, "Para Ti" (It's For You), a semi-acoustic track which reached Top ten in some countries. It was also the last musical theme that Thomas performed live in her career, it happened in May 2002.

=== 2002–present: Retirement ===
In May 2002, Thomas retired from music and public life. She started writing songs and directing backing vocals for other singers including RBD, Kudai and Eme 15.

=== Sudden absence from public life ===
From 2002 to April 2018, she was absent from the public eye. On April 19, 2018, she made her first post on her new Twitter account, @LyndaThomasOf, briefly addressing her extended absence. On April 24, she posted a video going into detail. She is now a mother to a boy named Noah, and she married her songwriter Carlos Lara.

== Discography ==
=== Studio albums / Singles ===
Year	Album title	Singles from the album	Album details
1996	Lynda	1996: "Gira Que Gira"; 1996: "Blue Jeans"; 1996: "El Amor No Tiene Edad"	* Label: EMI Capitol * Formats: CD, LP, cassette
1997	Un grito en el corazón	1997: "Dile"; 1997: "Corazón"; 1998: "Bang Bang"; 1998: "Un Grito en el Corazón"	* Label: EMI Capitol * Formats: CD, cassette
1999	Mi Día de la Independencia	1999: "No Quiero Verte"; 1999: "Maldita Timidez"; 1999: "Corazón Perdido"	* Label: EMI Capitol * Formats: CD, cassette, VCD
2001	Polen	2001: "Lo Mejor De Mi"; 2002: "Mala Leche"; 2002: "Para Tí"	* Label: EMI Capitol * Formats: CD, cassette, digital download
2018	Hola y Adiós	2018: N/A	* Label: BoBo Records / Sony Music * Formats: CD, digital download

=== Reissues ===
Year	Album title	Singles from the album	Album details
2000	Mi Día de la Independencia (Edición Especial)	2000: "A Mil X Hora"; 2000: "Laberinto"	* Label: EMI Capitol * Formats: CD, cassette
2002	Polen (U.S. re-release)	2002: "Mala Leche"	* Label: EMI Latin * Formats: CD, digital download

=== Extended plays ===
Year	Title	Singles	Details
1989	Cantemos Juntos	1989: "Cantemos Juntos"; 1990: "Cantemos Juntos" (Siempre en Domingo-Fantasía Musical live performance)	* Label: Discos y Cintas Melody * Formats: LP
2000	A Mil X Hora	2000: "A Mil X Hora"	* Label: EMI Capitol * Formats: CD

== Discography as a songwriter, record producer, assistant work and backup vocals ==
- (Uncredited work and songs credited to Thomas after 2002 are not included)

- Alissa - Alissa Rosángel (1993)
- Teletón (Mexico) (Compilation live albums) (1996-2001)
- Estrellas de Navidad (1997)
- Juan Pablo II Homenaje (1998)
- Primer amor... a mil por hora (2000) (writer, producer)
- Clase 406 (2002) (writer, producer)

== Filmography ==
Year	Title	Role	Notes
1989-1990	Fantasía Musical (TV series)	Herself	Performer
1997–1999	Ringling Bros. and Barnum & Bailey Circus	Herself	Host; performer
2000	Carita de Ángel	Herself	2 episodes
2000	Primer amor... a mil por hora	Herself	Cameo appearance; performed "A Mil por Hora (a cappella)"
2001	2001 Viña del Mar International Song Festival	Herself	Member of the international Jury, performer
2001	Nickelodeon Kids' Choice Awards	Herself	Co-host alongside Juanes (live broadcast for IberoAmerica)
2002	Nickelodeon Kids' Choice Awards	Herself	Host (live broadcast for IberoAmerica)
