= Pedro Damián =

Mexican television producer and director

- Born: Pedro Muñoz Romero; 12 November 1952 (age 73); Mexico City, Mexico
- Occupations: Actor, television producer, director
- Years active: 1971-present (actor); 1982–present (director); 1992–present (producer)
- Spouse: Gabriela Reus
- Children: 3

Pedro Muñoz Romero (born 29 November 1952), known as Pedro Damián, is a Mexican television producer, actor, director and executive producer of popular teen telenovelas. His works include Clase 406, Lola, Érase Una Vez, Mis XV, Rebelde, Like, la leyenda and RBD: La Familia, distributed within and outside Mexico. He has worked with musical acts RBD and Eiza Gonzalez.

== Career ==
=== Actor ===
Damián began his career in 1971, appearing in the Mexican telenovela El amor tiene cara de mujer. Throughout the 1970s he appeared in Mexican films and telenovelas and had roles in two Hollywood films: The Return of a Man Called Horse (1976) and Eagle's Wing (1979). Apart from a role in El vuelo del águila (1990s), Damián's acting career had ceased until 2001; he returned with an uncredited role in an American movie for Showtime television, Warden of Red Rock.

Small roles in two more American films, Collateral Damage (co-starring Arnold Schwarzenegger) and Showtime (co-starring Eddie Murphy and Robert De Niro) followed in 2002. The same year he returned to movies in Mexico in the film Amar te duele, playing the father of "Renata", the main character. In 2007, he appeared in Amar and Deseo, and played a recurring character in the Mexican television series S.O.S.: Sexo y otros Secretos.

=== Director/producer ===
Damián was a founder and the musical director of the Mexican youth music group Timbiriche. His first role as TV director was for the Mexican telenovela La Pobre Señorita Limantour in 1983, which was followed by others throughout the 1980s. In 1986, he began directing telenovelas for producer Carla Estrada; the two would continue to collaborate until he became a producer with the network.

His first credit as producer was for Ángeles sin paraiso in 1992. He produced seven more telenovelas for Televisa during the 1990s, including El abuelo y yo, this while continuing to direct. In 2002 he was executive producer for a telenovela for teens, Clase 406, running over four seasons and 365 episodes.

This was followed by Rebelde, which ran for three seasons and 440 episodes. The main young lead cast members of the series formed a band, RBD, which Damián represented and produced for. Damián is executive producer for the spinoff series, RBD: La Familia, and has produced three specials for RBD.

When Damian left the Estrada unit to form his own producing unit, Reynaldo Lopez took his place as director of the Estrada unit's television series, staying until 2007.

== Personal life ==
Damián was born and raised in Mexico City by a Mexican mother and Spanish father. He is the father himself of actresses Alexa (b. 1982) and Andrea Damián from his first marriage with Phillipa, brother of actor and TV director Juan Carlos Muñoz, and uncle of actor Yago Muñoz. From his marriage with Vicky Diaz, he has twin children, Roberta and Damian.

== Filmography ==
=== Actor ===
==== Films ====
- Father of the Bride (2022)
- Amar (2008) – Amado
- Cansada de besar sapos (2006) – Juan
- Que Hay Detrás de RBD (DVD) (2006) Doc.
- Amar te duele (2002) – Armando
- Showtime (2002) – Caesar Vargas
- Collateral Damage (2002) – River Rat
- The warden of Red Rock (2001) – Billy
- Gringo viejo (1989) – Capitán Ovando
- Los confines (1987) – pedro
- Mundo mágico (1983) – cosmo
- Caboblanco (1980) – Eduardo
- Mojado Power (1979) – nikolas perez pañacios
- Eagle's Wing (1979) – José
- Anacrusa (1979) – adomari
- La mujer perfecta (1977) – Pablo
- Ronda revolucionaria (1976) – evaº
- The Return of a Man Called Horse (1976) – Standing Bear
- Un Amor extraño (1975) – jaime
- Los 7 pecados capitales (1975) – ñoño
- La isla de los hombres solos (1974) -solt
- Los cachorros (1971) – bold

==== Tenovelas and soap operas ====
- S.O.S: Sexo y Otros Secretos (2007) – Genaro
- Clase 406 (2003) – Vargas
- El vuelo del águila (1994) – José María Pino Suárez
- Monte calvario (1986) – Alfonso
- Juegos del destino (1985) – Javier
- La Fiera (1984) – Rogelio Miranda
- Bianca Vidal (1983) – Gustavo
- Cachún cachún ra ra! (1981) – Profesor Buenrostro
- Ángel Guerra (1979)
- Humillados y ofendidos (1977)
- Mundo de juguete (1974)
- Mi rival (1973) – Daniel
- Me llaman Martina Sola (1972)
- El amor tiene cara de mujer (1971) – Aníbal

=== Producer ===
==== Telenovelas and soap operas ====
- Like (2018)
- Despertar contigo (2016)
- Muchacha Italiana Viene a Casarse (2014)
- Miss XV (2012)
- Niña de mi Corazón (2010)
- Verano de Amor (2009)
- Lola, érase una vez (2007)
- Rebelde (2004–06)
- Clase 406 (2002/03)
- Primer amor – A 1000 X Hora (2000/01)
- Amor Gitano (1999)
- Preciosa (1998)
- Mi pequeña traviesa (1997/98)
- Si Dios Me Quita La Vida (1995) (primera parte)
- Prisionera de amor (1994)
- Ángeles sin paraíso (1992/93)
- El abuelo y yo (1992)

=== Director ===
==== Telenovelas and soap operas ====
- Chispita (1982)
- La Pobre Señorita Limantour (1983)
- La Fiera (1983–1984)
- Quinceañera (1987)
- Carrusel (1989)
- Prisionera de Amor (1994)
- Luz Clarita (1996)
- Los hijos de nadie (1997)
- Mi Pequeña Traviesa (1997)
- Preciosa (1998)
- Amor Gitano (1999)
- Mis XV (2012)
- Muchacha Italiana viene a casarse (2014)

==== TV series ====
- RBD: La Familia (2007)
- Adicción R (2005)
- RBD: El fenómeno (2005)

== Awards and nominations ==
=== Premios TVyNovelas ===
Year	Category	Telenovela	Result
1989	Best Direction	Pasión y poder	Nominated
1993	Best Telenovela of the Year	El abuelo y yo	Nominated
2001	Best Telenovela of the Year	Primer amor... a mil por hora	Nominated
2003	Best Telenovela of the Year	Clase 406	Nominated
2006	Best Telenovela of the Year	Rebelde	Nominated
2016	Best Telenovela of the Year	Muchacha italiana viene a casarse	Nominated
