= List of songs recorded by RBD =

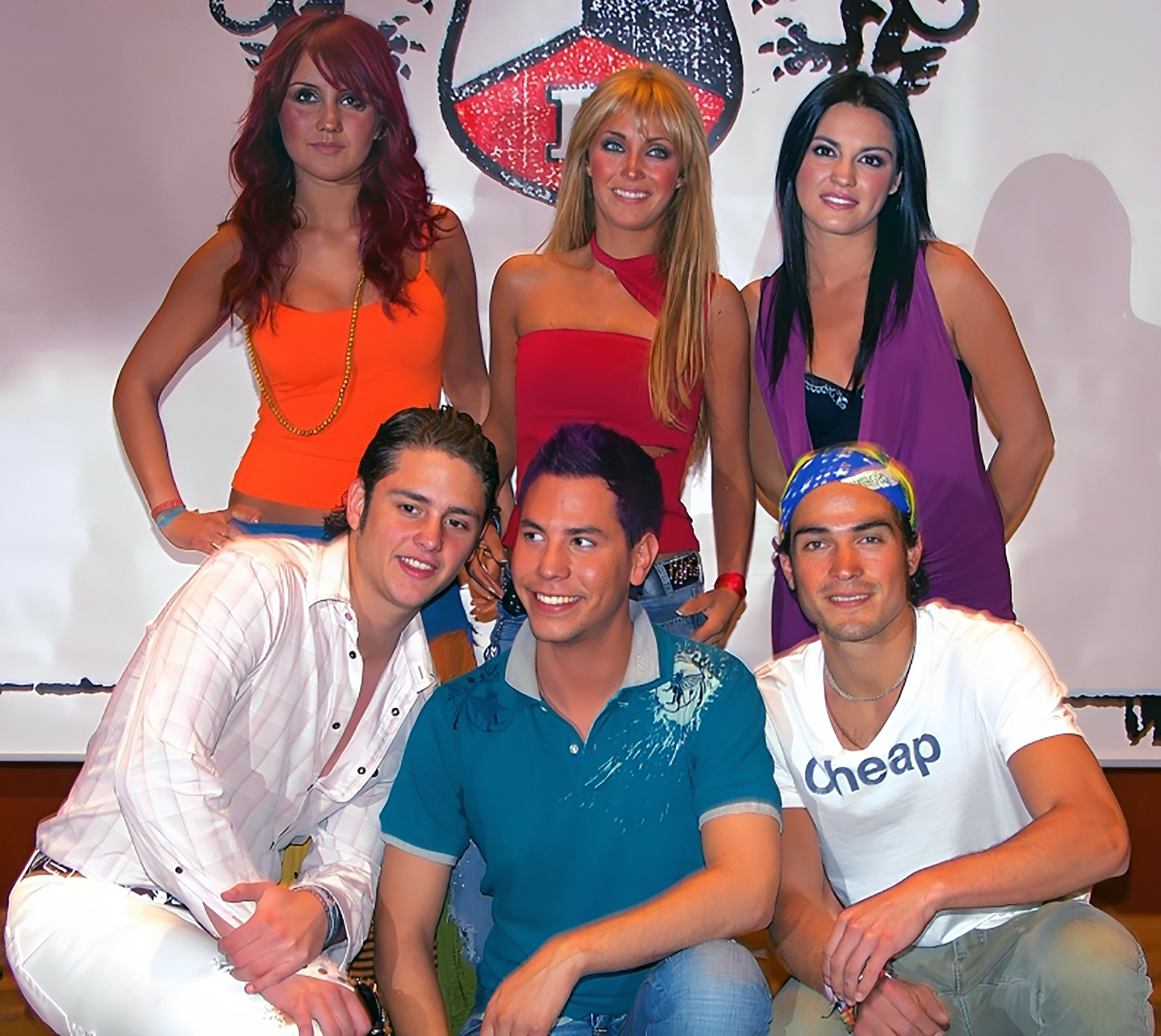
RBD in Brazil in 2006.

Mexican band RBD's music career began in 2004, during their participation in the telenovela Rebelde. RBD recorded songs for five studio albums in Spanish, six live albums, three albums in Portuguese and one album in English, recording more than 120 songs. Their first work in Spanish, Rebelde, was released in 2004 by EMI Music, which contains 11 songs and four singles.

Key
Indicates song included on an alternative version of the album
Indicates song written by an RBD member
Indicates bilingual recording
Indicates English-language recording
Indicates Portuguese-language recording

Name of song, writers, originating album, and year released.
Song	Artist(s)	Writer(s)	Album	Year	Ref.
"¿Quién Te Crees? "	RBD	Nate Campany; Jodi Marr; MachoPsycho; Tami Rodríguez	Para Olvidarte De Mí	2009	
"A La Orilla"	RBD	Carlos Lara; Pedro Damián	Empezar Desde Cero	2007	
"A Rabiar"	RBD	Polen Thomas (Note: Lynda Thomas billed as Polen Thomas); Karen Sokoloff (Note: Max di Carlo billed as Karen Sokoloff)	Big Brother 3-R	2005	
"A Tu Lado"	RBD	Carlos Lara; Karen Sokoloff	Nuestro Amor	2005	
"Aburrida y Sola"	RBD	Carlos Lara	Celestial	2006	
"Adiós"	RBD	Armando Ávila	Para Olvidarte De Mí	2009	
"Algún Día"	RBD	Carlos Lara	Celestial	2006	
"Amor Fugaz" (Note: Spanish cover version of Sabrina Salerno's "Love Is All There Is", originally released on Sabrina's album A Flower's Broken (1999).)	RBD	Michael Garvin; Winston Sela; Anthony Smith; Carlos Lara (Note: Adapted By)	Empezar Desde Cero	2007	
"Ao Seu Lado" (Note: Portuguese version of "A Tu Lado")	RBD	Carlos Lara; Cláudio Rabello	Nosso Amor Rebelde	2006	
"Así Soy Yo"	RBD	Fernando Rojo	Nuestro Amor	2005	
"Atrás de Mim" (Note: Portuguese version of "Tras De Mí")	RBD	Carlos Lara; Karen Sokoloff; Pedro Damián; Cláudio Rabello	Nosso Amor Rebelde	2006	
"Aún Hay Algo"	RBD	Carlos Lara; Karen Sokoloff	Nuestro Amor	2005	
"Beija-me Sem Medo" (Note: Portuguese version of "Bésame sin miedo")	RBD	Chico Bennett; John Ingoldsby; Cláudio Rabello	Celestial (Versão Brasil)	2006	
"Bésame Sin Miedo" (Note: Spanish cover version of the song "Kiss Me Like You Mean It" by American actress and singer Sara Paxton.)	RBD	Chico Bennett; John Ingoldsby; Carlos Lara	Celestial	2006	
"Camino Al Sol"	RBD	Debi Nova; Martin "Doc" McKinney	Para Olvidarte De Mí	2009	
"Campana Sobre Campana"	RBD	Public domain	Navidad Con Amigos	2006	
"Cariño Mío"	RBD	RedOne; Andrea Martin	Rebels (Note: "Tu Amor", "Wanna Play", "Cariño Mío" and "I Wanna Be the Rain" were included as a bonus track album sampler on the album Celestial.)	2006	
"Celestial"	RBD	Carlos Lara; Pedro Damián	Celestial	2006	
"Celestial" (Note: Portuguese version of "Celestial")	RBD	Carlos Lara; Pedro Damián; Cláudio Rabello	Celestial (Versão Brasil)	2006	
"Cerquita De Ti"	RBD		Non-album single	2023	
"Connected" (Note: "Connected" was originally written in English, but its first release was in Spanish by RBD as "Tenerte y Quererte", which appeared on the band's debut album, Rebelde (2004). "Connected" went on to be recorded by several artists, such as Sara Paxton in 2006, and Katharine McPhee, Amy Diamond, and Suzanne Shaw in 2008. RBD also recorded the song in its original language for their first English-language studio album.)	RBD	Amy Powers; Guy Roche	Rebels	2006	
"Cuando El Amor Se Acaba"	RBD	José Manuel Pérez Marino	Rebelde	2004	
"Dame"	RBD	Carlos Lara	Celestial	2006	
"Desapareció"	RBD	Yoel Henríquez; Rafael Esparza-Ruiz; Armando Ávila; Sheppard Solomon	Para Olvidarte De Mí	2009	
"El Mundo Detrás"	RBD	Dany Tomas; Sonia Molina	Empezar Desde Cero	2007	
"Empezar Desde Cero"	RBD	Armando Ávila	Empezar Desde Cero	2007	
"Enséñame"	RBD	Javier Calderón	Rebelde	2004	
"Ensina-Me" (Note: Portuguese version of "Enséñame")	RBD	Javier Calderón; Cláudio Rabello	Rebelde (Edição Brasil)	2005	
"Era La Música"	RBD	Alisha Brooks; Nick Nastasi; Evan V. McCulloch; Ryan William Stokes	Rebels	2006	
"Es por Amor"	RBD	Cachorro López; Sandra Baylac; Sebastián Schon	Celestial	2006	
"Esse Coração" (Note: Portuguese version of "Este corazón")	RBD	Armando Ávila; Cláudio Rabello	Nosso Amor Rebelde	2006	
"Estar Bien"	RBD; Kudai; Eiza González	Carlos Lara; Pedro Damián	Empezar Desde Cero	2008	
"Este Corazón"	RBD	Armando Ávila	Nuestro Amor	2005	
"Esté Donde Esté"	RBD	Armando Ávila	Para Olvidarte De Mí	2009	
"Extraña Sensación" (Note: Spanish adaptatation of the composition "Let's See Where It Go". The song has not been recorded in its original language.)	RBD	Kay Hanley; Jonathan Mead; Carlos Lara	Empezar Desde Cero	2007	
"Feliz Aniversário" (Note: Portuguese version of "Feliz Cumpleaños")	RBD	Jade Ell; Mats Hedström; Cláudio Rabello	Nosso Amor Rebelde	2006	
"Feliz Cumpleaños" (Note: "Feliz Cumpleaños" is a spanish cover version of Mikeyla's "Happy Worst Day", originally released on Mikeyla's album Glorious (2005). RBD went on to record the original version for their first English studio album Rebels (2006).)	RBD	Jade Ell; Mats Hedström; Carlos Lara	Nuestro Amor	2005	
"Fique Em Silêncio" (Note: Portuguese version of "Solo Quédate En Silencio")	RBD	Mauricio L. Arriaga; Cláudio Rabello	Rebelde (Edição Brasil)	2005	
"Fora" (Note: Portuguese version of "Fuera")	RBD	Mauricio L. Arriaga; Cláudio Rabello	Nosso Amor Rebelde	2006	
"Fuego"	RBD	Double N (Note: Niklas Bergwall and Niclas Kings billed as Double N); RamPac (Note: Johan Ramström and Patrik Magnusson billed as RamPac); Papa Dee; Boyzo	Rebelde	2004	
"Fuera"	RBD	Mauricio L. Arriaga	Nuestro Amor	2005	
"Fui La Niña" (Note: Spanish adaptatation of the composition "Being A Good Girl". The song has not been recorded in its original language.)	RBD	Mads Krog; Mika Black; Armando Ávila; Michkin Boyzo	Empezar Desde Cero	2007	
"Futuro Ex-Novio"	RBD	Sean & Dame (Note: Sean Hosein and Dane DeViller billed as Sean & Dame); Steve Smith; Anthony Anderson; Michkin Boyzo	Rebelde	2004	
"Gone" (Note: "Me Voy" is a Spanish-language cover version of Kelly Clarkson's "Gone", originally released on Clarkson's album Breakaway (2004). RBD went on to record the original version for the Japanese edition of their first English studio album Rebels (2006).)	RBD	Kara DioGuardi; John Shanks	Rebels	2007	
"Hace Un Instante"	RBD	Carlos Lara	Para Olvidarte De Mí	2009	
"Happy Worst Day"	RBD	Jade Ell; Mats Hedström	Rebels	2006	
"Hoy Que Te Vas"	RBD	Armando Ávila; Ángel Reyero	Empezar Desde Cero	2007	
"I Wanna Be the Rain" (Note: "Quisiera Ser" is the spanish version of the song "I Wanna Be the Rain", originally written by Diane Warren for RBD's first English-language album Rebels (2006).)	RBD	Diane Warren	Rebels	2006	
"Inalcanzable"	RBD	Carlos Lara	Empezar Desde Cero	2007	
"Keep It Down Low" (Note: English version of "Solo Quédate En Silencio")	RBD	Mauricio Arriaga	Rebels	2006	
"Lágrimas Perdidas"	RBD	Armando Ávila; Dulce María	Para Olvidarte De Mí	2009	
"Lento"	RBD	Francisco Saldaña	Mas Flow: Los Benjamins	2007	
"Lento" (Remix) (Note: Wisin & Yandel recorded alternate vocals and lyrics for "Lento" (Remix).)	RBD; Wisin & Yandel	Francisco Saldaña; Jose M. Gomez	Mas Flow: Los Benjamins	2006	
"Let the Music Play" (Note: Originally recorded by American singer Shannon for her album of the same name (1984).)	RBD	Chris Barbosa; Ed Chisolm	Rebels	2007	
"Liso, Sensual"	RBD	DJ Kafka (Note: Carlos Lara billed as DJ Kafka); Max di Carlo	Tour Generación RBD En Vivo (Note: Later featured on their second album, Nuestro Amor.)	2005	
"Llueve En Mi Corazón"	RBD	Mauricio L. Arriaga; J. Eduardo Murguía	Empezar Desde Cero	2007	
"Los Peces en el Río"	RBD	Public domain	Navidad Con Amigos	2007	
"Más Tuya Que Mía"	RBD	Dulce María; Felipe Díaz	Para Olvidarte De Mí	2009	
"Me Cansé"	RBD	Carolina Rosas; Gabriel Esle	Celestial	2006	
"Me Cansei" (Note: Portuguese version of "Me Cansé")	RBD	Gabriel Esle; Carolina Rosas; Cláudio Rabello	Celestial (Versão Brasil)	2006	
"Me Dar" (Note: Portuguese version of "Dame")	RBD	Carlos Lara; Cláudio Rabello	Celestial (Versão Brasil)	2006	
"Me Voy"	RBD	Kara DioGuardi; Mauri Stern	Nuestro Amor	2005	
"Medley 1 (Me He Enamorado De Un Fan/No Sé Si Es Amor/Ámame Hasta Con Los Dientes/ Rayo Rebelde/Baile Del Sapo/Me Vale)"	RBD	Ignacio Cano; Memo Méndez Guiú; Jim Jacobs; Warren Casey; Julissa; Richard O' Brian; Alex González	Tour Generación RBD En Vivo	2005	
"Medley 2 (Cuando Baja La Marea/Te Quiero/Verano Peligroso/Devuélveme a mi chica/ La Chica Del Bikini Azul/Viviendo De Noche/De Música Ligera/Es Mejor Así)"	RBD	Consuelo Arango; Marella Cayre; David Summers Rodríguez; J.R. Flórez; Honorio Herrero; J. Losada Calvo; D. Maroto; Zeta Bosio; Gustavo Cerati; Giuseppe Dati; Raf	Tour Generación RBD En Vivo	2005	
"México, México"	RBD		México, México	2006	
"Mírame"	RBD	Cachorro López; Sebastián Schon	Para Olvidarte De Mí	2009	
"Money Money" (Note: Samples RBD's song "Lento" (2006).)	RBD	Gabriel Cruz Padilla "Wise"; Francisco Padilla "Luny"; Anthony Calo Cotto "Nales"; Aarón Peña "Doble A"	Rebels	2006	
"My Philosophy" (Note: English version of "Dame")	RBD	Carlos Lara	Rebels	2006	
"No Digas Nada"	RBD	Armando Ávila; Ángel Reyero	Empezar Desde Cero	2007	
"No pares"	RBD	Lynda Thomas	Live in Hollywood	2006	
"Nosso Amor" (Note: Portuguese version of "Nuestro Amor")	RBD	Memo Méndez Guiú; Emil "Billy" Méndez; Cláudio Rabello	Nosso Amor Rebelde	2006	
"Nuestro Amor"	RBD	Memo Méndez Guiú; Emil "Billy" Méndez	Nuestro Amor	2005	
"O Que Há Por Trás" (Note: Portuguese version of "Qué Hay Detrás")	RBD	Carlos Lara; Karen Sokoloff; Cláudio Rabello	Nosso Amor Rebelde	2006	
"O Que Houve Com O Amor" (Note: Portuguese version of "Qué Fue Del Amor")	RBD	Armando Ávila; Cláudio Rabello	Nosso Amor Rebelde	2006	
"Olvidar"	RBD	Juan Carlos Perez Soto; Patric Sarin; Jukka Immonen	Para Olvidarte De Mí	2009	
"Otro Día Que Va"	RBD	DJ Kafka; Max di Carlo	Rebelde	2004	
"Para Olvidarte de Mí"	RBD	Carlos Lara; Pedro Muñoz Romeron	Para Olvidarte De Mí	2009	
"Puedes Ver Pero No Tocar" (Note: Spanish cover version of the song "You Can Look" by Monrose, from their album I Am (2008).)	RBD	Robin Jenssen; Nermin Harambasic; Anne Judith Wiik; Ronny Vidar Svendsen; Carlos Lara	Para Olvidarte De Mí	2009	
"Quando O Amor Acaba" (Note: Portuguese version of "Cuando El Amor Se Acaba")	RBD	José Manuel Pérez Marino; Cláudio Rabello	Rebelde (Edição Brasil)	2005	
"Qué Fue del Amor"	RBD	Armando Ávila	Nuestro Amor	2005	
"Qué Hay Detrás"	RBD	Carlos Lara; Karen Sokoloff	Nuestro Amor	2005	
"Quem Sabe" (Note: Portuguese version of "Quizá")	RBD	Ángel Reyero; Armando Ávila; Michkin Boyzo; Cláudio Rabello	Celestial (Versão Brasil)	2006	
"Querer-Te" (Note: Portuguese version of "Tenerte Y Quererte")	RBD	Guy Roche; Amy Powers; Cláudio Rabello	Rebelde (Edição Brasil)	2005	
"Quiero Poder"	RBD	Armando Ávila; Dulce María; Gonzalo Schroeder	RBD: La Familia	2007	
"Quisiera Ser"	RBD	Diane Warren; Carlos Lara; Pedro Damián	Celestial	2006	
"Quizá"	RBD	Ángel Reyero Pontes; Armando Ávila; Michkin Boyzo	Celestial	2006	
"Rebelde"	RBD	DJ Kafka; Max di Carlo	Rebelde	2004	
"Rebelde" (Note: Portuguese version of "Rebelde")	RBD	DJ Kafka; Max di Carlo; Cláudio Rabello	Rebelde (Edição Brasil)	2005	
"Sálvame"	RBD	Carlos Lara; Pedro Damián; Max di Carlo	Rebelde	2004	
"Salva-Me" (Note: Portuguese version of "Sálvame")	RBD	DJ Kafka; Max di Carlo; Pedro Damián; Cláudio Rabello	Rebelde (Edição Brasil)	2005	
"Santa No Soy" (Note: Spanish cover version of Vanessa S.'s "I Ain't No Saint", originally released on Vanessa's album Ride with Me (2003).)	RBD	LaCarr (Note: Nick Nice and Pontus Söderqvist billed as LaCarr); Michkin Boyzo	Rebelde	2006	
"Save Me" (Note: English version of "Sálvame")	RBD	DJ Kafka; Max di Carlo; Pedro Damián	Rebels	2004	
"Ser o Parecer"	RBD	Armando Ávila	Celestial	2006	
"Ser Ou Parecer" (Note: Portuguese version of "Ser o Parecer")	RBD	Armando Ávila; Cláudio Rabello	Celestial (Versão Brasil)	2006	
"Si No Estás Aquí"	RBD	Alfonso Herrera; Güido Laris	Empezar Desde Cero	2007	
"Siempre He Estado Aquí"	RBD	Mauricio Rengifo; Andrés Torres	Ser O Parecer: The Global Virtual Union (Note: "Siempre He Estado Aquí" was released as a digital single in 2020, a live version was released in 2021 as a digital single, and on the album Ser O Parecer: The Global Virtual Union in 2021. A new version featuring vocals by Dulce María titled "S.H.E.A." was released in 2023.)	2020	
"Sinceridad"	RBD	Adrián Posse; Cynthia Posse; Darío Moscatelli; Cynthia Nilson	La Música De Los Valores (Note: Promotional album only.)	2008	
"Só Para Você" (Note: Portuguese version of "Solo Para Ti")	RBD	Mario Sandoval; Cláudio Rabello	Nosso Amor Rebelde	2006	
"Solo Para Ti"	RBD	Mario Sandoval	Nuestro Amor	2005	
"Sólo Quédate En Silencio"	RBD	Mauricio L. Arriaga	Rebelde	2004	
"Sua Doce Voz" (Note: Portuguese version of "Tu Dulce Voz")	RBD	Patrick Berger; Kara DioGuardi; Cláudio Rabello	Celestial (Versão Brasil)	2006	
"Sueles Volver"	RBD	Christopher von Uckermann; Charly Rey; Güido Laris	Empezar Desde Cero	2007	
"Tal Vez Después" (Note: Spanish cover version of the song "Too Late" by Belgian singer Natalia from her debut studio album This Time (2003).)	RBD	Kara DioGuardi; Gregg Alexander; Rick Nowels; Michkin Boyzo	Celestial	2006	
"Tal Vez Mañana"	RBD	Maite Perroni; Orlando Calzada; Güido Laris	Empezar Desde Cero	2008	
"Talvez Depois" (Note: Portuguese version of "Tal Vez Después")	RBD	Rick Nowels; Kara DioGuardi; Gregg Alexander; Cláudio Rabello	Celestial (Versão Brasil)	2006	
"Te Daría Todo"	RBD	Dulce María; Gonzalo Schroeder	Empezar Desde Cero	2008	
"Tenerte Y Quererte"	RBD	Guy Roche; Amy Powers; Max di Carlo	Rebelde	2004	
"The Family"	RBD	Carlos Lara	Celestial	2007	
"This Is Love" (Note: English version of "Nuestro Amor")	RBD	Memo Méndez Guiú; Emil "Billy" Méndez	Rebels	2006	
"Tras de Mí"	RBD	Carlos Lara; Karen Sokoloff; Pedro Damián	Nuestro Amor	2005	
"Tu Amor" (Note: Originally recorded by American singer Jon B. on his album Cool Relax (1997).)	RBD	Diane Warren	Rebels	2006	
"Tu Amor" (Navidad Mix) (Note: Christian Chávez, Alfonso Herrera, and Anahí recorded alternate vocals and lyrics for "Tu Amor" (Navidad Mix).)	RBD	Diane Warren	Rebels	2006	
"Tu Dulce Voz" (Note: Spanish cover version of "The Little Voice", originally recorded by Swedish singer Sahlene for her debut studio album It's Been a While (2003).)	RBD	Kara DioGuardi; Patrik Berger; Michkin Boyzo	Celestial	2006	
"Um Pouco Desse Amor" (Note: Portuguese version of "Un Poco De Tu Amor")	RBD	DJ Kafka; Max di Carlo; Cláudio Rabello	Rebelde (Edição Brasil)	2005	
"Uma Canção" (Note: Portuguese version of "Una Canción")	RBD	José Roberto Matera (Note: Joe Carvajal billed as José Roberto Matera); CJ Turbay Daccarett (Note: Johann Daccarett billed as CJ Turbay Daccarett); Cláudio Rabello	Nosso Amor Rebelde	2006	
"Un Poco De Tu Amor"	RBD	DJ Kafka; Max di Carlo	Rebelde	2004	
"Una Canción" (Note: Cover version of Colombian band Los de Adentro, originally released on their album Los de Adentro (1999).)	RBD	José Roberto Matera; C. Johann Turbay Daccarett	Tour Generación RBD En Vivo (Note: Live version. A studio version was later released on Nuestro Amor (Edición Diamante).)	2005	
"Venha de Novo O Amor" (Note: Portuguese version of "Aún hay algo")	RBD	Carlos Lara; Karen Sokoloff; Cláudio Rabello	Nosso Amor Rebelde	2006	
"Wanna Play"	RBD	RedOne; Andrea Martin	Rebels	2006	
"Y No Puedo Olvidarte"	RBD	Carlos Lara	Empezar Desde Cero	2007	
"Yo Vivo Por Ti"	RBD	MachoPsycho; Nate Campany; Jodi Marr	Para Olvidarte De Mí	2009	

== Unreleased songs ==
Name of song, writers, and any other notes
Song	Writer(s)	Year	Notes	Ref.
"Bécalos"	Unknown	2007	Official theme song for the social campaign for scholarships called "Bécalos".; A promotional video was released.	
"Llévame" (Note: Dulce María released the song for free in 2010. Seven years later, it was illegally released to iTunes and credited to RBD.)	Dulce María; Alfonso Herrera	2009	Intended for RBD's studio album Para Olvidarte De Mí (2009).	
"Los 5 Magníficos"	Unknown	2007	Official theme song for the TV show "Los 5 Magníficos".	
"Mi Siempre"	Mary Morín	Unknown	There is a demo version recorded by Mary Morín.	
"Nací Para Amarte"	Maite Perroni; Christopher von Uckermann; Guido Laris	2009	Intended for RBD's studio album Para Olvidarte De Mí (2009).	
"No Vuelvas"	Unknown	2009	Intended for RBD's studio album Para Olvidarte De Mí (2009).	
"Una Pequeña Voz" (Note: Spanish cover version of the song "One Small Voice", originally featured on Sesame Street in 1991.)	Jeff Moss	2008	Featured in an episode of the children's television show "Plaza Sésamo".; Featuring vocals by characters Pancho and Lola.	
