= Hecho en España (video) =

Live album by RBD
- Released: October 1, 2007
- Recorded: June 22, 2007
- Venue: Vicente Calderón Stadium (Madrid, Spain)
- Genre: Pop
- Length: 113 minutes (approx.)
- Language: Spanish; English
- Label: EMI
- Director: Güido Laris

RBD chronology
Live in Rio (2007)	Hecho en España (2007)	Empezar Desde Cero (2007)

Hecho en España (English: Made in Spain) is the fifth material release by Mexican pop group RBD, released on October 1, 2007 in Mexico and on October 2, 2007 in Spain.

The concert was shot at the Vicente Calderón Stadium in Madrid, Spain, on June 22, 2007 in front of almost 40,000 people enjoying the group's music. The DVD shows RBD's concert in Madrid during their "Tour Celestial 2007" in Spain. The DVD was released with special edition packs: one included gloves and a lighter, and another included gloves and an umbrella. The DVD packs went on pre-sale on September 27, 2007 in Mexico, slated for their October 1 release.

An accompanying live album CD of the same name was also released, selling over 100,000 copies in Mexico and Spain. In Brazil, a limited edition of the live album CD, of only which 2,000 copies were produced, was released to celebrate the sales of over 50,000 copies of the DVD in that country.

== Background and release ==
The live concert video was shot at the Vicente Calderón Stadium in the city of Madrid, Spain, from a concert that formed part of RBD's Tour Celestial 2007 world tour. The concert setlist mainly consisted of songs from the group's third and fourth studio albums, Celestial and Rebels.

The DVD was released on October 1, 2007 in Mexico and on October 2, 2007 in Spain. In Brazil, the live concert DVD was released on November 20, 2007. The official release of the DVD, as well of its live album CD counterpart, was held on October 3, 2007 to coincide with RBD's 'Worldwide RBD Day' celebration, which gathered 5,000 fans in an autograph signing that lasted four hours. RBD band member Anahí stated regarding the release in Mexico: "The truth is this is surprising, we're very excited and thankful to know that our Mexican fans follow us every step of the way just like the first day and that the 'Rebeldemania' instead of decreasing continues to grow and we couldn't be happier."

== Track listings ==
DVD 1

1. "Obertura Celestial" – 0:51
2. "Cariño Mío" – 3:17
3. "Ser o Parecer" – 3:23
4. "Wanna Play" – 3:32
5. "Bienvenida Maite" – 1:07
6. "Dame" – 4:11
7. "Money Money" – 3:43
8. "Diálogo Dulce" – 1:29
9. "Quiero Poder" – 2:46
10. "Intro Sálvame" – 0:43
11. "Sálvame" – 3:42
12. "Medley" ("Sólo Quédate En Silencio"/"Enséñame"/"Cuando El Amor Se Acaba"/"Un poco de tu amor"/"Otro día que va") – 6:51
13. "Video Music Show" – 2:23
14. "Intro Bésame" – 1:07
15. "Bésame sin miedo" – 3:30
16. "Besos Puente Musical" – 0:50
17. "I Wanna Be the Rain" – 4:53
18. "Presentación Músicos" – 4:11

DVD 2

1. "Anahí Presenta Algún Día" – 2:07
2. "Algún Día" – 4:12
3. "Medley" ("Quizá"/"Este Corazón") – 4:46
4. "Poema Dulce/Intro No Pares" – 2:24
5. "No Pares" – 4:51
6. "Tu Amor" – 5:03
7. "Intro Fuera" – 3:24
8. "Nuestro Amor" – 3:56
9. "Aún Hay Algo" – 3:36
10. "Intro Tras De Mí" – 0:37
11. "Tras de Mí" – 3:45
12. "Celestial" – 3:28
13. "Rebelde" – 3:21
14. "Soy Gitano, Grupo Flamenco" – 6:10
15. "Despedida" – 1:19
16. "Cariño Mío Reprise" – 1:48

Bonus material

- Detrás de RBD (Behind the scenes) – 2:35

== Personnel ==
Credits adapted from the DVD's liner notes.

Recording location

- Vicente Calderón Stadium (Madrid, Spain)

Mastering location

- The Mastering Lab (Ojai, California)

Performance credits

- RBD – main artist

Musicians

- Güido Laris – bass, musical director
- Mauricio Soto "Bicho" – drums
- Antonio Carbonell – flamenco ensemble
- José Carbonell Muñoz – flamenco ensemble
- José Carbonell Serrano – flamenco ensemble
- Pedro Gabarre Carbonell – flamenco ensemble
- Juan Ramón García Gabarre – flamenco ensemble
- Enrique Heredia – flamenco ensemble
- Vicente José Suero Vega – flamenco ensemble
- Charly Rey – guitar
- Gonzalo Velázquez – guitar
- Eduardo Tellez – keyboards, piano
- Luis Carrillo "Catire" – percussion

Production

- Camilo Lara – A&R
- Fernando Grediaga – A&R
- Diego Torán – A&R
- Angélica Pérez Allende – A&R coordination
- Güido Laris – arrangements, director, editing, mixing, post-production
- Rubén Ramírez – assistant
- Roberto Carlos Sánchez – assistant
- Luis Luisillo M. – associate producer
- Sangwook "Sunny" Nam – DVD audio mastering, DVD video mastering
- Grako A. Guilbert – DVD authoring
- Pablo Chávez – editing, mixing, post-production
- Pedro Damián – executive producer
- hulahula.com.mx – graphic design
- Televisa En Vivo – management
- Juanlu Vela – photography
- Carolina Palomo – production coordinator
- Fernando Díaz – recording
- Pablo Medrano – recording
- Fernando Fernández "Camachete" – recording assistant

== Charts and certifications ==
=== Weekly charts and certifications ===
Chart (2007)	Peak positions	Certifications	Sales
Spain (PROMUSICAE)	1	Gold	10,000
Mexico (AMPROFON)	2	Platinum	20,000

=== Year-end charts ===
Chart (2007)	Position
Spain PROMUSICAE – TOP 10 DVD MUSICAL 2007	1

== Release information ==
Region	Release date	Format	Label
Mexico	October 1, 2007	DVD, digital download	EMI
Spain	October 2, 2007	DVD, digital download	EMI
Brazil	November 20, 2007	DVD, digital download	EMI

== See also ==
- Hecho en España (album)
