= Hecho en España =

Live album by RBD
- Released: October 1, 2007
- Recorded: June 22, 2007
- Venue: Vicente Calderón Stadium (Madrid, Spain)
- Genre: Latin pop
- Length: 74:22
- Language: Spanish; English
- Label: EMI
- Producer: Pedro Damián (exec.)

RBD chronology
Celestial (Fan Edition) (2007)	Hecho en España (2007)	Empezar Desde Cero (2007)

Hecho en España, also known as Hecho en Madrid (English: Made in Spain or Made in Madrid), is the third live album by Mexican pop group RBD, released on October 1, 2007, in Mexico and on October 2 in Spain. The CD was recorded in Madrid on June 22, 2007, as part of RBD's Tour Celestial 2007. The show was held at the famous Spanish Vicente Calderón Stadium in front of almost 40,000 people. A live video of the entire concert was also recorded and released on DVD. The CD itself was released in a series of special edition packs: one included gloves and a lighter and a CD/DVD bundle, while another pack included gloves and an umbrella as well as a CD and DVD. The CD/DVD packs went on pre-sale on September 27, 2007, in Mexico, slated for their October 1 release. In February 2008, four months after the DVD release in Brazil, the CD was released in a special limited edition, celebrating the sales of over 50,000 DVDs in the country.

== Background and release ==
The live album was recorded at the Vicente Calderón Stadium in the city of Madrid, Spain, from a concert that formed part of RBD's Tour Celestial 2007 world tour. The concert setlist mainly consisted of songs from the group's third and fourth studio albums, Celestial and Rebels, and several songs from the group’s first two albums.

The album was released on October 1, 2007, in Mexico and on October 2 in Spain. In Brazil, only the accompanying live concert DVD of the same name was released. The official album release was held on October 3 to coincide with the group's Worldwide RBD Day celebration, which gathered 5,000 fans in an autograph signing that lasted four hours. Regarding the album's release in Mexico, RBD band member Anahí stated, "The truth is this is surprising, we're very excited and thankful to know that our Mexican fans follow us every step of the way just like the first day and that the 'Rebeldemania' instead of decreasing continues to grow and we couldn't be happier."

== Track listing ==
Hecho en España – [CD 1]
No.	Title	Writer(s)	Length
1.	"Obertura Celestial"	Güido Laris	1:36
2.	"Cariño Mío"	RedOne; Andrea Martin	3:15
3.	"Ser O Parecer"	Armando Ávila	3:23
4.	"Wanna Play"	RedOne; Martin	3:33
5.	"Dame"	Carlos Lara	4:20
6.	"Money Money"	Gabriel Cruz Padilla "Wise"; Francisco Saldaña "Luny"; Anthony Calo Cotto "Nales"; Aarón Peña "Doble A"	3:48
7.	"Quiero Poder"	Dulce María; Gonzalo V. Schroeder; Ávila	2:47
8.	"Sálvame"	DJ Kafka; Max di Carlo; Pedro Damián	4:25
9.	"Bésame sin miedo"	Chico Bennett; John Ingoldsby	3:31
10.	"I Wanna Be the Rain"	Diane Warren	4:49
Total length:			35:27

Hecho en España – [CD 2]
No.	Title	Writer(s)	Length
1.	"Algún Día"	Lara	4:16
2.	"Medley": "Quizá"/"Este Corazón"	Ávila; Michkin Boyzo; Ángel Reyero	4:37
3.	"No Pares"	Thomas	4:58
4.	"Tu Amor"	Warren	5:01
5.	"Nuestro Amor"	Memo Médez Guiú; Emil "Billy" Méndez	3:55
6.	"Aún Hay Algo"	Lara; Karen Sokoloff	3:36
7.	"Tras de Mí"	Lara; Sokoloff; Damián	3:47
8.	"Celestial"	Lara; Damián	3:28
9.	"Rebelde"	DJ Kafka; di Carlo	3:21
10.	"Cariño Mío Reprise"	RedOne; Martin	1:56
Total length:			38:55

Notes

- The album did not include some songs that RBD performed during the actual live concert, these being a medley from their first studio album, Rebelde (2004) (Note: "Solo Quédate en Silencio", Enséñame", "Cuando El Amor Se Acaba", "Un Poco De Tu Amor", and "Otro Día Que Va".), "Fuera" and "Me Voy" (Note: From their second studio album, Nuestro Amor (2005).) and "Tal Vez Mañana" performed solely by Maite Perroni (Note: Later included on the fan edition of their fifth studio album Empezar Desde Cero (2008).). There are unofficial recordings of these songs, but in low quality and edited by fans.

== Personnel ==
Credits adapted from the album's liner notes.

Recording location

- Vicente Calderón Stadium (Madrid, Spain)

Mastering location

- The Mastering Lab (Ojai, California)

Performance credits

- RBD – main artist

Musicians

- Güido Laris – bass, musical director
- Mauricio Soto "Bicho" – drums
- Charly Rey – guitar
- Gonzalo Velázquez – guitar
- Eduardo Tellez – keyboards, piano
- Luis Carrillo "Catire" – percussion

Production

- Camilo Lara – A&R
- Fernando Grediaga – A&R
- Diego Torán – A&R
- Angélica Pérez Allende – A&R coordination
- Güido Laris – arrangements, director, editing, mixing, post-production
- Rubén Ramírez – assistant
- Roberto Carlos Sánchez – assistant
- Luis Luisillo M. – associate producer
- Sangwook "Sunny" Nam – DVD audio mastering, DVD video mastering
- Doug Sax – DVD video mastering
- Pablo Chávez – editing, mixing, post-production
- Pedro Damián – executive producer
- hulahula.com.mx – graphic design
- Televisa En Vivo – management
- Juanlu Vela – photography
- Carolina Palomo – production coordinator
- Fernando Díaz – recording
- Pablo Medrano – recording
- Fernando Fernández "Camachete" – recording assistant

== Charts and certifications ==
=== Charts ===
Chart	Peak Position
Mexican Albums Chart (AMPROFON)	21
Spanish Albums Chart (PROMUSICAE)	47
US Billboard Top Latin Albums	39

=== Certifications ===
Country	Certification
Spain (PROMUSICAE)	Gold

== Release history ==
Region	Release date	Format	Label
Mexico	October 1, 2007	CD, digital download	EMI
Spain	October 2, 2007	CD, digital download	EMI
Mexico	December 2020	Double CD-DVD	Universal Music

== See also ==
- Hecho En España (DVD)
