= Celestial (RBD album) =

2006 RBD album

Studio album by RBD
- Released: November 23, 2006
- Recorded: 2006
- Studio: Igloo Music (Los Angeles, California); Montecristo Studios (Mexico City, Mexico)
- Genre: Latin pop; pop rock
- Length: 40:30
- Language: Spanish
- Label: EMI; EMI Televisa; Televisa
- Producer: Carlos Lara; Armando Ávila

RBD chronology
Nosso Amor Rebelde (2006)	Celestial (2006)	Celestial (Versão Brasil) (2006)

Singles from Celestial
- 1. "Ser o Parecer" Released: September 18, 2006; 2. "Celestial" Released: March 13, 2007; 3. "Bésame Sin Miedo" Released: June 28, 2007; 4. "Dame" Released: August 12, 2007

"Ser O Parecer" (2006)
RBD's second major hit single worldwide.

Celestial (English: Heavenly) is the third studio album by Mexican Latin pop vocal group RBD, released on November 23, 2006, in Mexico and on November 24, 2006 in the rest of Latin America and the United States. The album was recorded in Los Angeles and Mexico City, and was produced by Carlos Lara and Armando Ávila. The group also recorded a special version of the album for their fanbase in Brazil. This edition of the album, recorded in Portuguese, was released on December 4, 2006 and was titled Celestial (Versão Brasil).

In the US, the album reached number one on the Billboard Latin Pop Albums chart and Top Latin Albums chart. The album reached positions number two and nine in the albums charts of Spain and Mexico, respectively, and sold 40,000 copies in the former country and 150,000 in the latter, gaining Gold certification in Spain and being certified Platinum and Gold in Mexico. In Brazil, the album reached position number three, while in Ecuador, Romania and Chile the album was certified Gold, with sales of 5,700, 10,000 and 12,000 copies, respectively. The album also charted at number 37 in Croatia.

"Ser o Parecer" served as the album's lead single and was released on September 18, 2006, and had the support of a CGI-assisted music video. It garnered commercial success, peaking at number one in various charts worldwide for weeks. With this song, the group gained the best single chart performance of their career on the Billboard Hot Latin Songs chart, where it became their first number-one hit, while also debuting and peaking at number 84 on the Billboard Hot 100 chart. The album's second single was the title track, which had an accompanying hippie-style music video. The third single released was "Bésame Sin Miedo", which had its music video filmed in Romania. Lastly, "Dame" was released as the fourth and final single.

== Background and release ==
"We've selected "Celestial" as the second single due to the surveys we have conducted with the fans, and the polls they've been sending us and they've demonstrated that the song is one of their favorites, as well that they have managed to connect really well with the lyrics and the feeling of the song, which is Carlos Lara's, and we worked together on the lyrics."

—Pedro Damián on the release of the album's second single.

Celestial was released through EMI on November 23, 2006 in Mexico and on November 24, 2006 in the United States and the rest of Latin America. On December 4, 2006, a Portuguese language version of the album was released in Brazil, including 8 tracks in Portuguese and 3 in Spanish.

The album was produced by Carlos Lara and Armando Ávila, who were responsible for the success of RBD's first two studio albums, Rebelde and Nuestro Amor, with Pedro Damián serving as executive producer. The release contains a two-minute sample of tracks that RBD would include in their English language debut, Rebels, which was put on sale on December 19, 2006.

The album included the Spanish language cover version of "The Little Voice", originally recorded by Swedish singer Sahlene and later by American recording artist Hilary Duff on her album Metamorphosis (2003); the cover was titled "Tu Dulce Voz". Another cover track on the album, "Bésame Sin Miedo", is the Spanish language version of the song "Kiss Me Like You Mean It", by singer and actress Sara Paxton.

The album was re-released as Celestial (Fan Edition) in Mexico on June 26, 2007 and on July 10, 2007 in the United States. The Mexican version of Celestial (Fan Edition) contains a CD with the tracklist of the standard version of the album plus "The Family", the theme song from the group's 2007 sitcom RBD: La Familia, and remixes of "Tu Amor", "Tal Vez Después" and "Ser O Parecer". The CD also has Opendisc enhanced content, so when inserted into a PC, it grants access to an exclusive website with photo galleries, digital downloads and more. The reissue also includes a DVD with the band's exclusive rehearsals of songs like "Nuestro Amor", karaoke of ten of the group's hits and the music videos for "Tu Amor", "Ser O Parecer" and "Celestial". The US version of the Celestial (Fan Edition) includes a different DVD with the group's soundcheck performance on Walmart Soundcheck and interviews with the band members.

To promote the album, four singles were released. The album's lead single, "Ser O Parecer", was a success all over Latin America, also managing to top the Mexican airplay and US Latin singles charts. After the success of the first single, RBD released three singles simultaneously for promotion all over America. While Mexico got "Celestial" first, "Bésame Sin Miedo" was sent first to Colombia, and at the same time the United States and Puerto Rico were able to hear "Dame" on their local radio stations.

== Artwork ==
RBD member Anahí was put in charge of the image and style of the group for the album, so for the wardrobe she got inspiration from urban clothing, attempting to emulate the clothing of street beggars. The album's photoshoot took place in some train tracks, alleys and urban settings in Los Angeles, California. The cover artwork for the standard edition of the album shows the members of RBD looking intently to the camera, wearing ragged clothing, in front of a backdrop of what seems to be blue sheet metal. The CD backcover shows the group on some train tracks.

For the cover artwork of the fan edition of the album, a picture from the previous photoshoot was used, which showed the group in front of a blue background with fuchsia-color details.

On the Portuguese edition of the album, a photograph taken during filming of the music video for "Ser O Parecer", which was filmed in Brazil, was used as the cover artwork. The picture shows the group in tattered clothing inside some type of abandoned building.

== Promotion ==
=== Singles ===
On September 18, 2006, the first single off Celestial, titled "Ser O Parecer", was released. Two days later, the Portuguese version of the single, "Ser Ou Parecer", was released in Brazil. In the United States, the single reached the No. 1 spot on both the Billboard Latin Pop Airplay and the Billboard Hot Latin Songs charts. The single also ranked at position #84 on the all-encompassing US Billboard Hot 100, becoming RBD's first Spanish single to do so. The single received a nomination at the 2007 Premios Juventud in the category "My Favorite Ringtone". The single's music video was directed by Esteban Madrazo and was filmed in São Paulo, Brazil. The music video was also nominated at the 2007 Premios Juventud in the category "My Favorite Music Video".

On March 11, 2007, the album's second single, the title track "Celestial", was released in Mexico and the rest of Latin America. The single was chosen through a survey made to RBD's fanbase. The single reached position No. 40 on the US Billboard Latin Pop Airplay chart. The single's music video was filmed in Mexico, and shows the members of RBD as hippies enjoying a day in a field between the volcanoes Iztaccihuatl and Popocatepetl, and was also directed by Esteban Madrazo. The single was also nominated at the 2007 Premios Juventud in the categories "My Favorite Music Video" and "My Favorite Ringtone".

On June 28, 2007, "Bésame Sin Miedo", the third and final official single from the album was released. The single ranked at No. 15 on the US Billboard Latin Pop Airplay chart and at No. 30 on the US Billboard Hot Latin Songs chart. The single's accompanying music video was filmed at Bran Castle, popularly known as the castle of Count Dracula, in Transylvania.

On August 12, 2007, "Dame" was released as a promotional single only in the United States. The promotional release managed to chart at No. 14 on the Billboard Latin Pop Airplay chart and at No. 38 on the Billboard Hot Latin Songs chart.

=== Live performances ===
In 2006, RBD presented themselves in the American TV show Sábado Gigante, where they performed "Ser O Parecer". In the 2006 edition of Walmart Soundcheck, a program sponsored by the Walmart retail chain to promote albums being released, the group sang "Ser O Parecer", the album's official lead single. During the group's 2006 visit to Brazil, they performed "Ser O Parecer" on the Brazilian TV show Domingo Legal. In December 2006, the group performed "Ser O Parecer" on AOL Music; in this particular performance, however, Anahí was not present.

In 2007, the group participated for a second time on Walmart Soundcheck. This time, they performed the tracks "Bésame Sin Miedo", "Dame", and "Celestial". That year, the band also appeared on the music television show CD USA, where they performed "Celestial" and "Ser O Parecer". In June 2007, during their visit to Romania, the group performed the track "Ser O Parecer" on Acasă TV. On July 19, 2007, the group attended the 4th annual Premios Juventud, where they performed their single "Bésame Sin Miedo". On July 20, the group returned to Sábado Gigante and performed "Celestial" and "Bésame Sin Miedo". On July 25, the group appeared at the Ritmoson Latino-organized concert titled "Confesiones en Concierto", where they performed "Ser O Parecer", along with "Quizá", "Bésame Sin Miedo", and "Celestial". In August 2007, the group appeared on the Mexican TV show Muévete, where they also performed "Ser O Parecer". In September 2007, the group performed "Ser O Parecer" on the Mexican daily morning program Hoy and appeared on the ninth episode of the reality show Buscando a Timbiriche, La Nueva Banda to perform "Bésame Sin Miedo". In December 2007, the group appeared on the Mexican Teletón, where they performed their singles "Celestial" and "Bésame Sin Miedo". On December 12, RBD performed their No. 1 hit "Ser O Parecer" at the Premios Fox Sports awards show in Miami Beach, Florida. On December 15, the group appeared on the TV program Mi TRL, broadcast in the United States by MTV Tr3s, and performed "Celestial" and "Bésame Sin Miedo". To close 2007, the band also appeared on the Mexican TV program Otro Rollo and on the Miami-based El Show de Cristina, where they performed "Bésame Sin Miedo", "Celestial" and "Ser O Parecer" at both venues.

After the promotion for Celestial had officially ended, on February 1, 2008, RBD performed at the festivities preceding Super Bowl XLII, where they sang again "Ser O Parecer". On March 20, 2008, the group performed their single "Bésame Sin Miedo" on the US television special Feliz 2008, hosted by Don Francisco. On March 25, 2008, the group appeared in Spain's TVE gala, where they again performed their successful single "Ser O Parecer". On July 19, 2008, the band performed at the concert organized to celebrate the 50-year anniversary of Televisa in Monterrey, Mexico, where they sang "Celestial", "Bésame Sin Miedo" and "Ser O Parecer". Lastly, on October 25, 2008, the group performed songs from Celestial in one of the last performances of their career at the Exa TV concert in Mexico, which was broadcast through the Mexican television network TeleHit.

=== Tour ===
On April 20, 2007, RBD started their third worldwide concert tour, titled Tour Celestial 2007, in Guayaquil, Ecuador. The tour visited the United States and Europe, as well as Central and South America. The band also continued to increase their string of successes internationally; the band's visits to Romania and Spain during 2007 surprised the Latin American entertainment industry, while giving the band the opportunity to win over the Spanish music market, one of the most competitive music markets in the world. On June 22, 2007, as a result of their successful performances in Spain, as part of the band's tour, in a unique concert in the Vicente Calderón Stadium in Madrid in front of 40,000 people, they recorded their third live album and live concert video, Hecho en España, where the group displayed their unique material and their command of the stage. In early October 2007, it was announced through Roptus.com that the rest of the tour was postponed until later announcement. The reason given through RBD's website was that the group wanted to give their public a better show by performing songs from their then upcoming album Empezar Desde Cero, which would be released on November 20, 2007. With the tour, RBD collected $5,400,000 in ticket sales just in North America, and sold a combined total of 293,742 tickets to their concerts worldwide.

== Critical reception ==
Professional ratings
Review scores
Source	Rating
Allmusic	3.5/5 stars
Amazon.com	Negative
MSN Music	4.5/5 stars
Territorio da Música	2/5 stars

Despite its commercial success, Celestial received mixed reviews from music critics. Jason Birchmeier from AllMusic gave the album a 3.5 out of 5 stars rating, and commented in his review that "producers Carlos Lara and Armando Ávila [...] stick with their winning formula and wind up with a few standout songs: "Tal Vez Después", "Ser O Parecer," and "Dame," which are front-loaded for a catchy kickoff to the album." He added: "In the end, such a factory-line approach undoubtedly amounts to generic music, and indeed, Celestial isn't all that different from Nuestro Amor (however, the departure of songwriter Max di Carlo, who had written [the group's] initial hits, including their theme song "Rebelde", does differentiate this from their superior debut album). But as with any heavily invested mass-marketed product, it generally pays off to give customers what they want and expect, and Celestial should indeed please the teen pop group's hemisphere-spanning fan base as well as the suits at EMI[...]."

Joey Guerra from Amazon.com debated in his review: "It would be nice to compliment the group's maturity, but there's almost none on this plastic collection of pop pastries. If anything, the group's vocals seem even more limited -particularly the boys- maybe because they haven't had a break since RBD-mania hit." In his review, Guerra showed disregard towards the voice of RBD band member Dulce María, commenting that her voice "still squeals with all the weight of a helium balloon". Finally, Guerra also commented unfavorably about the preview of the group's English album. However, MSN Music users gave the album a 4.5 out of 5 stars rating.

Catia Dechen, from the Terra Networks-affiliated Territorio da Música website, highlighted the group's success, and reviewed: "Celestial without a doubt reached the success in sales as [the band's] previous albums, as the group resulted in being all the rage with the teenage public of various countries as well as with the media, is charismatic and keeps in the new album their proven formula for conquest: Beautiful youths and a pop repertoire easy to digest. The songs continue without losing quality, it goes without saying, but the fact is that the 'rebeldes' are America's favorites".

== Commercial performance ==
The album enjoyed great success in North America upon release. The album sold 137,000 copies in 4 days from its release in the United States, making it debut at number 15 on the Billboard 200 and at number 1 on the Billboard Top Latin Albums ranking, where it charted for 9 consecutive weeks. The album, however, achieved the feat without a full week of registered album sales, due to its release being on a Friday, by then close to Billboard's tracking week. Despite both facts, the album became RBD's first and only album to peak in the top 20 of the Billboard 200. In 2008, Keith Caulfield of Billboard magazine revealed that Celestial had sold a total of 498,000 copies in the United States since its release, according to Nielsen SoundScan. In Mexico, the album debuted at number forty-six on the Mexican Top 100 Albums chart, having sold on its first day of release 100,000 copies. On its tenth charting week, the album climbed to number nine in the Mexican Top 100 Albums Chart. Due to the eventual sales of over 150,000 copies in Mexico, Celestial was certified Platinum + Gold by the Asociación Mexicana de Productores de Fonogramas y Videogramas (AMPROFON).

In Europe, the album also met with a warm reception. In Spain, the album was released on March 12, 2007, and debuted and peaked at No. 2 for two weeks on the Spanish Albums Chart. The PROMUSICAE association awarded the album a Gold certification for the sales of 40,000 copies in Spain. In Croatia, the album reached position No. 37 on the country's album chart. In Romania, the album was also certified Gold for the sales of 10,000 copies in the country.

In South America, the album also met with a welcome reception since its release. In Brazil, the album charted at No. 3 on the Brazilian Albums Chart, where its eventually-released Portuguese-language counterpart only reached No. 17. In Chile, the Federación Internacional de la Industria Fonográfica (IFPI) awarded the album a Gold certification for the sales of 5,700 albums. According to IFPI, the album was awarded the same certification in Ecuador, but for sales of 3,000 copies in the country.

== Track listing ==
Celestial – Standard edition
No.	Title	Writer(s)	Producer(s)	Length
1.	"Tal Vez Después"	Kara DioGuardi; Gregg Alexander; Rick Nowels; Michkin Boyzo	Armando Ávila	3:06
2.	"Ser o Parecer"	Ávila	Ávila	3:31
3.	"Dame"	Carlos Lara	Lara	4:04
4.	"Celestial"	Lara; Pedro Damián	Lara	3:27
5.	"Quizá"	Ángel Reyero Pontes; Ávila; Boyzo	Ávila	3:32
6.	"Bésame Sin Miedo"	Chico Bennett; John Ingoldsby; Lara	Lara	3:31
7.	"Tu Dulce Voz"	DioGuardi; Patrik Berger; Boyzo	Ávila	3:19
8.	"Algún Día"	Lara	Lara	4:07
9.	"Me Cansé"	Carolina Rosas; Gabriel Esle	Ávila	2:41
10.	"Aburrida y Sola"	Lara	Lara	3:53
11.	"Es por Amor"	Cachorro López; Sandra Baylac; Sebastián Schon	Lara	3:17
12.	"Rebels" (Bonus track album sampler: "Tu Amor" / "Wanna Play" / "Cariño Mío" / "I Wanna Be the Rain")	Diane Warren; Nadir Khayat; Andrea Martin		2:02
Total length:				40:30

Celestial – International edition
No.	Title	Writer(s)	Length
12.	"Quisiera Ser"	Warren; Lara; Damián	4:01
13.	"Rebels" (Bonus track album sampler: "Tu Amor" / "Wanna Play" / "Cariño Mío" / "I Wanna Be the Rain")	Warren; Khayat; Martin	2:00
Total length:			44:29

Celestial – iTunes exclusive edition
No.	Title	Writer(s)	Length
1.	"Ser O Parecer" (Remix)	Ávila	6:33
Total length:			47:03

Notes

- "Tal Vez Después" is the Spanish-language cover version of the song "Too Late" by Belgian singer Natalia from her debut studio album This Time (2003).
- "Bésame Sin Miedo" is the Spanish-language cover version of the song "Kiss Me Like You Mean It" by American actress and singer Sara Paxton.
- "Tu Dulce Voz" is the Spanish-language cover version of "The Little Voice", originally recorded by Swedish singer Sahlene for her debut studio album It's Been a While (2003), and later by American actress and singer Hilary Duff for her second studio album Metamorphosis (2003).
- "Quisiera Ser" is the Spanish-language cover version of the song "I Wanna Be the Rain", originally written by Diane Warren for RBD's first English-language album Rebels (2006).

== Celestial Fan Edition ==
Celestial Fan Edition

Studio album (reissue) by RBD
- Released: June 26, 2007
- Recorded: 2006–2007
- Studio: Igloo Music (Los Angeles, California); Montecristo Studios (Mexico City, Mexico)
- Genre: Latin pop; teen pop
- Length: 62:22
- Language: Spanish; English
- Label: EMI
- Producer: Carlos Lara; Armando Ávila; Pedro Damián (exec.); Camilo Lara (exec.); Emilio Ávila (exec.)

RBD chronology
RBD: La Familia (2007)	Celestial Fan Edition (2007)	Hecho en España (2007)

Celestial was re-released as Celestial (Fan Edition) in Mexico on June 26, 2007 and on July 10, 2007 in the United States. The Mexican version of Celestial (Fan Edition) contains a CD with the tracklist of the standard version of the album plus "The Family", the theme song from the group's 2007 sitcom RBD: La Familia, and remixes of "Tu Amor", "Tal Vez Después" and "Ser o parecer". The CD also has Opendisc enhanced content, so when inserted into a PC, it grants access to an exclusive website with photo galleries, digital downloads and more. The reissue also includes a DVD with the band's exclusive rehearsals of songs like "Nuestro Amor", karaoke of ten of the group's hits and the music videos for "Tu Amor", "Ser O Parecer" and "Celestial". The US version of Celestial (Fan Edition) includes a different DVD with the group's soundcheck performance on Walmart Soundcheck and interviews with the band members.

With the release of Celestial (Fan Edition), Celestial re-entered the Billboard Top Latin Albums chart at No. 10 on the July 18, 2007 issue, the album's 31st week on the chart. The album also re-entered the Billboard 200 at No. 192 with 3,818 copies sold that week.

== Track listing ==
Celestial (Fan Edition)
No.	Title	Writer(s)	Length
1.	"Tal Vez Después"	Rick Nowels; Kara DioGuardi; Gregg Alexander; Michkin Boyzo	3:06
2.	"Ser O Parecer"	Ávila	3:31
3.	"Dame"	Carlos Lara	4:04
4.	"Celestial"	Lara; Pedro Damián	3:27
5.	"Quizá"	Ángel Reyero; Ávila; Boyzo	3:32
6.	"Bésame Sin Miedo"	Chico Bennett; John Ingoldsby; Lara	3:31
7.	"Tu Dulce Voz"	Patrick Berger; DioGuardi; Boyzo	3:19
8.	"Algún Día"	Lara	4:07
9.	"Me Cansé"	Gabriel Esle; Carolina Rosas	2:41
10.	"Aburrida y Sola"	Lara	3:53
11.	"Es Por Amor"	Sandra Baylac; Cachorro López; Sebastián Schon	3:17
12.	"Quisiera Ser"	Damián; Lara; Diane Warren	4:01
13.	"Rebels" (Bonus track album sampler: "Tu Amor"/"Wanna Play"/"Cariño Mío"/"I Wanna Be The Rain")	Andrea Martin; RedOne; Warren	2:02
14.	"The Family"	Lara	3:43
15.	"Tu Amor" (Chico Latino Remix)	Warren	5:42
16.	"Tal Vez Después" (Remix)	Nowels; DioGuardi; Alexander; Boyzo	5:59
17.	"Ser O Parecer" (Remix)	Ávila	6:28
Total length:			62:22

Celestial (Fan Edition) – Mexican edition DVD
No.	Title	Length
1.	"The Rehearsal" ("Nuestro Amor"/"Solo quédate en silencio"/"Ser O Parecer"/"Tras de mí"/"Tu Amor")
2.	"Music videos" ("Tu Amor"/"Ser O Parecer"/"Celestial")
3.	"Karaoke" ("Rebelde"/"Un poco de tu amor"/"Sálvame"/"Enséñame"/"Solo Quédate en Silencio"/"Nuestro Amor"/"Tras de Mí"/"Este corazón"/"Aún Hay Algo"/"No Pares")

Celestial (Fan Edition) – US edition DVD
No.	Title	Length
1.	"The Rehearsal" ("Nuestro Amor"/"Solo Quédate en Silencio"/"Ser O Parecer"/"No Pares"/"Tu Amor"/"Tras de Mí")
2.	"Interview"
3.	"Music videos" ("Tu Amor"/"Celestial"/"Ser O Parecer")

Notes

- "Bésame Sin Miedo" is the Spanish language cover version of the song "Kiss Me Like You Mean It", by American singer and actress Sara Paxton.
- "Tu Dulce Voz" is the Spanish language cover version of "The Little Voice", originally recorded by Swedish singer Sahlene and later by American recording artist Hilary Duff on her album Metamorphosis (2003).

== Credits and personnel ==
Credits adapted from the album's liner notes.

Recording locations

- Igloo Music (Los Angeles, California)
- Montecristo Studios (Mexico City, Mexico)

Mixing locations

- Igloo Music (Los Angeles, California)
- COSMOS Studios México (Mexico City, Mexico)

Vocals

- RBD – all vocals

Musicians

- Armando Ávila
- Keith Curtis
- Brian Kahanek
- Güido Laris
- Iván Machorro
- Sylvia Moore

Production

- Camilo Lara – A&R, executive producer
- Melissa Mochulske – A&R coordination
- Güido Laris – arrangements, programming, vocal direction
- Iván Machorro – arrangements, programming
- Luis Luisillo Miguel – associate producer
- Emilio Ávila – executive producer
- Pedro Damián – executive producer
- Hula+Hula – graphic design
- BJ – hairstyling
- Angela Kalinowski – hairstyling
- Antonio Rivera – hairstyling
- Armando Becerril – make-up
- Javier de la Rosa – make-up
- Marisol Alcelay – marketing, product manager
- Bernie Grundman – mastering
- Armando Ávila – mixing, producer, recording engineer
- Gustavo Borner – mixing engineer, recording engineer
- Carlos Lara – music direction, producer, vocal direction
- Yvonne Venegas – photography
- Roger Rosas – production assistant
- Jorge González – production coordinator
- Carolina Palomo – production coordinator
- Ignacio Segura – recording assistant
- Pablo Chávez – recording engineer
- Scott Conrad – recording engineer
- Brian Kahanek – recording engineer
- Juan Carlos Moguel – recording engineer
- Ruy Fulguera – string arrangement
- Sergio Zamudio – vocal direction
- Christopher Lawrence – wardrobe coordinator

== Accolades ==
Year	Ceremony	Award	Result
2007	Billboard Latin Music Awards	Latin Pop Album of the Year – Duo or Group	Won
2007	Billboard Latin Music Awards	Top Latin Albums Artist of the Year	Won
2007	Orgullosamente Latino Awards	Latin Album of the Year	Won
2007	Premios Juventud	CD to Die For	Won
2007	Latin Music And Sports Awards	Album of the Year	Nominated
2008	Premios Lo Nuestro	Latin Pop Album of the Year – Duo or Group	Nominated

== Charts and certifications ==
=== Weekly charts ===
Chart	Peak position
Croatian Albums Chart	37
Mexican Albums Chart	2
Slovenian Albums (IFPI)	1
Spanish Albums Chart	2
US Billboard Latin Pop Albums	1
US Billboard Top Latin Albums	1
US Billboard 200	15

=== Year-end charts ===
Chart (2006)	Position
Mexican Albums Chart	45

Chart (2007)	Position
Mexican Albums Chart	34
Spanish Albums Chart	10
US Billboard Latin Pop Albums	1
US Billboard Top Latin Albums	1
US Billboard 200	113

== Certifications and sales ==
Region	Certification	Certified units/sales
Chile	Gold	
Ecuador	Gold	1,359
Mexico (AMPROFON)	Platinum+Gold	150,000^{^}
Romania	Gold	
Spain (Promusicae)	Gold	
United States	—	498,000
^{^} Shipments figures based on certification alone.

== Release history ==
Region	Date	Format	Label
Mexico	November 23, 2006	(Standard edition) CD, digital download	EMI
United States	November 24, 2006	(Standard edition) CD, digital download	EMI
Spain	March 5, 2007	(Standard edition) CD, digital download	EMI
Mexico	June 26, 2007	(Fan Edition) CD, CD+DVD, digital download	EMI
Worldwide	July 10, 2007	(Fan Edition) CD, CD+DVD, digital download	EMI
