= 2007 Premios Juventud =

4th Premios Juventud
- Date: July 19, 2007
- Location: Watsco Center in Miami, Florida
- Hosted by: Angélica Vale, Belinda Peregrín, Jaime Camil
- Website: Official Page

Television/radio coverage
- Network: Univision

The 4th Annual Premios Juventud (Youth Awards) were broadcast by Univision on July 19, 2007.

== Arraivals ==
- Aarón Díaz
- Alacranes Musical
- Alejandro Fernández
- Alfonso Herrera
- Anahí
- Ana Layevska
- Angélica Vale
- Aventura
- Belinda
- Beto Cuevas
- Camila
- Carlos Calderón
- Cristian Castro
- Cristian Chavez
- Christopher von Uckermann
- Daddy Yankee
- David Bisbal
- Dayanara Torres
- Don Omar
- Dulce Maria
- Enrique Iglesias
- Fanny Lu
- Frankie J
- Juan Luis Guerra
- Héctor el Father
- Ivy Queen
- Jaime Camil
- Los Super Reyes
- Luny Tunes
- Maite Perroni
- Mochy & Alessandra
- Rafael Amaya
- Rbd
- Sara Maldonado
- Toby Love
- Víctor Manuelle
- Wisin & Yandel
- Zion

== Performers ==
The following is a list of musical artists in order of performance:

- Cruz Martínez & Los Super Reyes Performed Muévelo
- Enrique Iglesias Performed Alguien Soy Yo And Dimelo
- Hector el Father Toby Love And Victor Manuelle Performed Sola
- Angélica Vale And Jaime Camil Performed Tu Belleza Es Un Misterio
- Daddy Yankee Performed Impacto And Ella Me Levanto
- Camila Performed Todo Cambió
- Fanny Lu Performed No te pido flores
- Wisin & Yandel And Don Omar Performed No Sé De Ella MySpace And Nadie Como Tu
- Alejandro Fernández Performed Te Quiero Mucho, Y Tú Lo Sabes
- Aventura Performed Mi Corazoncito
- David Bisbal Performed Amar Es Lo Que Quiero And Torre de Babel
- Belinda Performed Bella Traicion
- Mochy And Alexandra Performed La Otra
- RBD Performed Bésame Sin Miedo

== Music Category ==
=== The Perfect Combo ===
1. Bendita Tu Luz - Maná featuring Juan Luis Guerra
2. No, No, No - Thalía featuring Anthony "Romeo" Santos
3. Noche de Entierro - Wisin & Yandel, Daddy Yankee, Héctor el Father, Tony Tun-Tun & Zion
4. Te Lo Agradezco, Pero No - Alejandro Sanz featuring Shakira
5. Torre de Babel - Wisin & Yandel featuring David Bisbal

=== My Favorite Video ===
1. Angelito - Don Omar
2. Celestial - RBD
3. Noche de Entierro - Wisin & Yandel, Daddy Yankee, Héctor el Father, Tony Tun-Tun & Zion
4. No, No, No - Thalía featuring Anthony "Romeo" Santos
5. Ser o Parecer - RBD

=== Best Moves ===
1. Anahí
2. Chayanne
3. David Bisbal
4. Dulce María
5. Shakira

=== Favorite Mexican Artist ===
1. Alejandro Fernández
2. Alicia Villarreal
3. Intocable
4. Jenni Rivera
5. Pepe Aguilar

=== Voice of the Moment ===
1. Aventura
2. David Bisbal
3. RBD
4. Yuridia
5. Wisin & Yandel

=== Favorite Pop Star ===
1. David Bisbal
2. Luis Fonsi
3. RBD
4. Shakira
5. Thalía

=== Catchiest Tune ===
1. Celestial - RBD
2. Como Yo Nadie Te Ha Amado - Yuridia
3. Pegao - Wisin & Yandel
4. ¿Quién Me Iba a Decir? - David Bisbal
5. Ser o Parecer - RBD

=== Favorite Tropical Artist ===
1. Aventura
2. Juan Luis Guerra
3. Marc Anthony
4. Olga Tañón
5. Víctor Manuelle

=== CD to Die For ===
1. Amar Es Combatir - Maná
2. Celestial - RBD
3. Habla El Corazón - Yuridia
4. Los Vaqueros - Wisin & Yandel
5. Premonición - David Bisbal

=== Favorite Urban Artist ===
1. Daddy Yankee
2. Don Omar
3. Ivy Queen
4. RKM & Ken-Y
5. Wisin & Yandel

=== My Favorite Concert ===
1. Maná
2. RBD
3. Ricky Martin
4. Shakira
5. Wisin & Yandel

=== Favorite Rock Star ===
1. Alejandra Guzmán
2. Belinda
3. Juanes
4. Maná
5. Panda

=== Best Ballad ===
1. Algún Día - RBD
2. Amar es lo que quiero - David Bisbal
3. Como Yo Nadie Te Ha Amado - Yuridia
4. No, No, No - Thalía featuring Anthony "Romeo" Santos
5. Tu Recuerdo - Ricky Martin featuring La Mari & Tommy Torres

== Movie Category ==
=== Can He Act or What? ===
1. Antonio Banderas - (Take the Lead)
2. Christian Meier - (La Mujer de Mi Hermano)
3. Diego Luna - (Sólo Dios Sabe)
4. Gael García Bernal - (Babel)
5. Kuno Becker - (Goal!)

=== Favorite Flick ===
1. Babel
2. Bandidas
3. El Laberinto del Fauno
4. La Mujer de Mi Hermano
5. Volver

=== She Steals the Show ===
1. Adriana Barraza (Babel)
2. Ana de la Reguera (Nacho Libre)
3. Bárbara Mori (La Mujer de Mi Hermano)
4. Penélope Cruz (Bandidas & Volver)
5. Salma Hayek (Bandidas)

== Sports Category ==
=== Most Electrifying Male Player ===
1. Cuauhtémoc Blanco (Club América)
2. Guillermo Ochoa (Club América)
3. Omar Bravo (Club Deportivo Guadalajara)
4. Oswaldo Sánchez (Club Santos Laguna)
5. Rafael Márquez Álvarez (FC Barcelona)

=== I'm a Die Hard Fan of... ===
1. Club América
2. Club Deportivo Guadalajara
3. New York Yankees
4. Selección Mexicana de Futbol
5. Pumas Dorados de la UNAM

=== Most Electryfing Female Player ===
1. Ana Guevara (400 meters)
2. Lorena Ochoa (Mexican Golfer)
3. Maribel Domínguez (Soccer player)
4. Milka Duno (Race car driver)
5. Sofía Mulánovich (Peruvian surfer)

=== Promising New Player ===
1. Andrés Guardado (Club Atlas de Guadalajara)
2. Giovani dos Santos (FC Barcelona B)
3. José Reyes (New York Mets)
4. José Juan Barea (Dallas Mavericks)
5. Juan Carlos Mosqueda (Club América)

== Fashion and Image Category ==
=== She's Got Style ===
1. Anahí
2. Dulce María
3. Jennifer Lopez
4. Ninel Conde
5. Thalía

=== Girl of My Dreams ===
1. Anahí
2. Dulce María
3. Jennifer Lopez
4. Ninel Conde
5. Thalía

=== He's Got Style ===
1. Alfonso Herrera
2. Chayanne
3. Christopher Uckermann
4. Daddy Yankee
5. Luis Fonsi

=== Supermodel ===
1. Adriana Lima
2. Amelia Vega
3. Dayanara Torres
4. Gisele Bündchen
5. Sissi

=== What a Hottie! ===
1. Alfonso Herrera
2. Chayanne
3. Christopher Uckermann
4. Daddy Yankee
5. Ricky Martin

== Pop Culture Category ==
=== My Idol is... ===
1. Anahí
2. Dulce María
3. Shakira
4. Thalía
5. Ricky Martin

=== Paparazi's Favorite Target ===
1. Anahí
2. Jennifer Lopez
3. Luis Miguel
4. RBD
5. Paulina Rubio
