= Rebels (album) =

2006 RBD album

Studio album by RBD
- Released: December 19, 2006
- Recorded: 2006
- Studio: Various: Igloo Music Studios (Burbank, California); Ndahouse (Encino, California); Realsongs Studios D and W (Hollywood, California); Cosmos Studios 1 and 2 (Mexico City, Mexico); Studio 19 (Mexico City, Mexico); Integrated Studios (New York City)
- Genre: Latin pop; pop; teen pop; reggaeton; R&B
- Length: 40:28 (Standard edition); 50:40 (Bonus track edition); 58:52 (Japanese/Deluxe edition)
- Language: English; Spanish
- Label: EMI Latin; Virgin
- Producer: Various: Armando Ávila; Khris Kellow; Carlos Lara; Los Presidentes; Luny Tunes; Evan V. McCulloch; Nick Nastasi; RedOne; Claydes Ahmad Smith; Peter Stengaard; Ryan William Stokes

RBD chronology
Celestial (Versão Brasil) (2006)	Rebels (2006)	Live in Rio (2007)

Singles from Rebels
- 1. "Tu Amor" Released: September 22, 2006; 2. "Wanna Play" Released: December 17, 2006; 3. "Money Money" Released: December 19, 2006

Rebels is the fourth studio album by Mexican pop group RBD, released on 19 December 2006. It is their first and only English album. The album contains songs from the group's previous studio albums that were translated into English for the release, as well as new songs that were recorded exclusively for the project. Rebels falls into the genres of Latin pop and pop rock, with dance-pop, reggaeton and R&B stylings, which were new music styles for the group.

To promote the album, only two official singles were released. On 22 September the album's lead single, a cover of the ballad titled "Tu Amor", which was composed by Diane Warren, was released. With the song, the group won the Les Etoiles Cherie award in France for 'International Song of the Year' and a Mi TRL award for 'Best Music Video'. The album's second single was "Wanna Play", which was released only in the United States. The song did not have an accompanying music video. The third and last single to be released from the album was planned to be "Money Money", but the song only managed to be released as a promotional single in Spain on 19 December.

On 21 March 2007 a deluxe edition of the album, titled We Are RBD, was released only in Japan. The deluxe edition included two new cover tracks: "Let the Music Play" and "Gone", which were originally recorded by Shannon and Kelly Clarkson, respectively.

RBD member Christian Chávez mentioned that Rebels would be re-released in late 2007 or early 2008 and that the new version would contain new songs and a collaboration with the Black Eyed Peas on one of the tracks. The group's next single off the album was expected to be featured on this future re-release. Billboard magazine even published that the re-release would happen in early 2008 and it would feature three hip hop-influenced songs. When the group disbanded in 2009, nothing about the re-release was announced, so it is assumed to be canceled.

== Album information ==
"We showed to the people of Mexico and Latin America that the public still likes pure pop music, and we hope the United States will enjoy it as well. It's a good moment to show the world that we Mexicans can make good music and make the world sing our songs."

—Christian Chávez talking about Rebels.

On 21 November 2006, RBD released their third Spanish-language studio album, Celestial. Rebels was released as RBD's first English-language album on 19 December 2006, in the United States; the jewel case booklet of previous album Celestial initially announced that the album would come out on 26 December. The album leaked onto the Internet on 9 December. It had Pedro Damián as its executive producer and was recorded in California, New York City and Mexico City.

The album contains eight songs which were originally from the group's former Spanish albums that were re-recorded in English:

- "Connected" ("Tenerte y Quererte" from Rebelde)
- "Keep It Down Low" ("Solo Quédate En Silencio" from Rebelde)
- "Save Me" ("Sálvame" from Rebelde)
- "Happy Worst Day" ("Feliz Cumpleaños" from Nuestro Amor)
- "This Is Love" ("Nuestro Amor" from Nuestro Amor)
- "Gone" ("Me Voy" from Nuestro Amor)
- "My Philosophy" ("Dame" from Celestial)
- "I Wanna Be the Rain" ("Quisiera Ser" from Celestial)

The album's first track and lead single is a cover of the song "Tu Amor" which was originally released by singer Jon B. and written by Diane Warren, who also wrote the song "I Wanna Be the Rain". This song was recorded in English first, and was then translated by Carlos Lara for the album Celestial, which was ultimately released before Rebels.

"Connected" was also originally written in English, but its composers were not able to sell the song. It was bought by RBD's label in 2004 and adapted to Spanish for inclusion on the band's debut album. "Connected" has been covered by several different artists, such as Sara Paxton (recorded for the film Aquamarine) (Note: Paxton recorded the song for the film Aquamarine in February 2006.), Katharine McPhee, and Melissa Lyons with Cassidy Ladden (both for the film Barbie & the Diamond Castle), Amy Deasismont, and Suzanne Shaw.

The tracks "Happy Worst Day" and "Gone", are covers of songs by Swedish singer Mikeyla, and American singer-songwriter Kelly Clarkson, respectively. The former was a single from Mikeyla's self-titled debut studio album, and the latter (featured in the Japanese deluxe edition of the album) belongs to Clarkson's second studio album Breakaway. The group had previously recorded Spanish versions of the songs (titled "Feliz Cumpleaños" and "Me Voy") for their second studio album, Nuestro Amor.

The song "Money Money" is a reggaeton song that follows the group's previous release in this genre, "Lento". Both were produced by reggaeton production duo Luny Tunes. Despite the English title, it's the only track on the album that is mainly sung in Spanish.

On 28 November 2008 the album was released in Greece. The Greek edition of the album contained a bonus track featuring Greek pop singer Tamta. The song is titled "Agapw Αγαπώ I Love", and serves as the Greeklish remix of "Wanna Play". Two months later, Tamta made a Greek cover version of RBD's signature song "Rebelde", titled "Pame Parea".

Rebels was the first RBD studio album to not have a Portuguese language version since most of the adapted songs had already been translated in the Brazilian editions of their previous albums.

== Promotion ==
=== Singles ===
"Wanna Play"
A 30-second sample of the song features the band singing over a Latin pop influenced background.

The album's first single was the cover "Tu Amor", which was released on 22 September 2006. The song was composed by Diane Warren. The single officially debuted on the KISS-FM radio station in Los Angeles, California, after having been leaked on the Internet before its official launch date. The single won the Les Etoiles Cherie FM award in France for 'International Song of the Year', and the Mi TRL Award for 'Best Music Video'. The song's music video was filmed in a beach in Los Angeles and was premiered by MTV Tr3s on 23 October 2006. Its main vocals are performed solely by Christian Chávez, with the band providing background vocals.

The second single, released on 17 December 2006 only in the United States, was "Wanna Play". The song was composed by Andrea Martin and RedOne. The single, however, did not have the promotional support of a music video.

Lastly, the album's third single, "Money Money", was released on 19 December 2006, only in Spain. No music video was released to promote the single.

=== Live performances ===
RBD performed live various songs from Rebels on radio and television throughout 2006 and 2007.

In the 2006 edition of Walmart Soundcheck, a performance series by Walmart retail chain to promote albums being released, the group performed the album's lead, "Tu Amor", for the first time. On 24 November 2006, after their English interview on Yahoo! Music, they also performed "Tu Amor". In 2007, the group appeared on the US music TV show CD USA, where they also performed "Tu Amor", as well as "My Philosophy", "Wanna Play", "This Is Love", "I Wanna Be the Rain" and "Save Me".

On 28 May 2007, the group was invited by American businessman Donald Trump to appear on the year's biggest beauty pageant, Miss Universe 2007. The event took place on the Auditorio Nacional in Mexico City, where the group performed a medley of the songs "Wanna Play", "Cariño Mío", and "Money Money". On 25 July 2007, the group performed their single "Tu Amor" on the acoustic music TV show Confesiones en Concierto on Ritmoson Latino.

Also in 2007, the group participated for a second time on "Walmart Soundcheck". This time, they performed the tracks "Cariño Mío" and "Money Money" to continue the promotion for Rebels, as well as other tracks from their Spanish album Celestial.

=== Tour ===
Although the album did not count with an exclusive concert tour to promote it, the album's songs were included in RBD's third worldwide concert tour, the Tour Celestial. The concert tour included performances of the songs "Cariño Mío", "Wanna Play", "Money Money", "I Wanna Be the Rain", and "Tu Amor". The tour visited the United States and Europe, as well as Central and South America. The band also continued to increase their string of successes internationally; the band's visits to Romania and Spain during 2007 surprised the Latin American entertainment industry, while giving the band the opportunity to win over the Spanish music market, one of the most competitive music markets in the world.

On June 22, 2007, as a result of their successful performances in Spain as part of the Tour Celestial, in a unique concert in the Vicente Calderón Stadium in Madrid in front of 40,000 people, RBD recorded their third live album and live concert video, where the group displayed their unique material and their command of the stage.

In early October 2007, however, it was announced through Roptus.com that the rest of the tour was postponed until later announcement. The reason given through RBD's website was that the group wanted to give their public a better show by performing songs from their then upcoming album, which would be released on November 20, 2007. With the tour, RBD collected $5,400,000 in ticket sales just in North America, and sold a combined total of 293,742 tickets to their concerts worldwide.

== Critical reception ==
Professional ratings
Review scores
Source	Rating
AllMusic	2.5/5 stars
Amazon.com	Mixed
MSN Music	2/5 stars
The New York Times	Mixed

The album received mostly mixed reviews. Jason Birchmeier of AllMusic commented that the album's lead single, "Tu Amor", was "perfect for the project" due to its "simplicity" and "production". He also commented similarly about the tracks "Wanna Play" and "Cariño Mío" due to their "light yet trendy reggaeton production style." However, he ended his review by stating: "Unfortunately, the remainder of the 11 songs are mildly disappointing."

Denise Sheppard, editorial reviewer on Amazon.com, went on to describe the album and gave a background commentary on RBD's success, yet stated: "Since most of RBD are TV veterans, it's safe to say that some are perhaps more gifted actors than they are singers (consider Dulce María's painful Britney-on-helium whine). Thankfully, the songwriting is left up to the pros who provide a consistent balance of teen-friendly top-40 pop, largely centered around two topics: love and the loss of love. "Tu Amor" and "My Philosophy" are two examples of straight-up boy-band style love songs with a Latin hue; the group occasionally brings in a somewhat gruff reggaeton sound ("Cariño Mío", "Wanna Play") which is where they shine the brightest. There is admittedly very little that is rebellious about RBD, but their devoted audience clearly loves them just the way they are."

MSN Music critics gave the album a low two-star rating. Jon Pareles of The New York Times published a mixed review, complaining that none of the music is rebellious, and only one song has a Latin beat. He noted that the songs are not written by the group, nor do they play the instruments.

== Commercial performance ==
In North America, the album received at best a lukewarm reception. In the United States the album debuted at number 40 on the Billboard 200 album chart with first-week sales of 94,000 copies. On the day of release, the album's cover artwork was altered by changing the group's logo from white to pink. Ironically, the band's third Spanish-language album, Celestial, sold 137,000 copies in its debut week in the United States and peaked at number 15 on the Billboard 200, selling 43,000 more copies than Rebels in its first week. On its second week out, sales of Rebels in the United States plummeted 68%, despite that the album dropped only nine positions on the Billboard 200. In total, the album has sold 225,000 copies in the United States as of 2008, according to Nielsen SoundScan. In Mexico, the album charted poorly considering the success of the group's previous releases, only managing to reach No. 74 on the Mexican Albums Chart, its peak position. With all, the album managed to be certified Gold by the Asociación Mexicana de Productores de Fonogramas y Videogramas (AMPROFON) for the sales of 50,000 copies.

The album received a more welcome reception in Europe. In Spain, the album debuted at No. 3 on the Spanish Albums Chart, reached No. 1 on its second week on the chart and kept the number-one position for two weeks straight. The album was listed at No. 30 on the best-selling albums of 2007 year-end chart in Spain, according to PROMUSICAE. With that, Productores de Música de España (PROMUSICAE) granted the album a Gold certification for its sales of 20,000 copies in Spain.

In South America, the album also received a good reception since its release. In Brazil, the album reached the No. 1 position on the Brazilian Albums Chart.

Almost unexpectedly, the album received an excellent reception in Asia, particularly in Japan, where the Recording Industry Association of Japan (RIAJ) granted the album a Gold certification for the sales of 100,000 copies in the country. Rebels has sold some 2.5 million copies worldwide.

== Track listing ==
Rebels – Standard edition
No.	Title	Writer(s)	Length
1.	"Tu Amor"	Diane Warren	4:38
2.	"Wanna Play"	RedOne; Andrea Martin	3:41
3.	"My Philosophy"	Carlos Lara	4:05
4.	"Connected"	Amy Powers; Guy Roche	3:16
5.	"I Wanna Be the Rain"	Warren	4:07
6.	"Cariño Mío"	RedOne; Martin	3:12
7.	"Era La Música"	Alisha Brooks; Nick Nastasi; Evan V. McCulloch; Ryan William Stokes	3:31
8.	"Keep It Down Low"	Mauricio Arriaga	3:36
9.	"Happy Worst Day"	Jade Ell; Mats Hedström	3:02
10.	"This Is Love"	Memo Méndez Guiú; Emil "Billy" Méndez	3:39
11.	"Save Me"	Lara; Pedro Damián; Max di Carlo	3:56
Total length:			40:28

Rebels – Bonus track edition
No.	Title	Writer(s)	Length
12.	"Money Money" (Spanish language bonus track)	Gabriel Cruz Padilla "Wise"; Francisco Padilla "Luny"; Anthony Calo Cotto "Nales"; Aarón Peña "Doble A"	3:56
13.	"Tu Amor" (Navidad Mix)	Warren	4:36
14.	"Celestial" (4 song album sampler including "Ser O Parecer", "Dame" and "Bésame Sin Miedo")		2:00
Total length:			50:40

Rebels – Walmart EP
No.	Title	Writer(s)	Length
1.	"No Pares" (Original performance series)	Lynda Thomas	4:34
2.	"Nuestro Amor" (Original performance series)	Méndez Guiú; Méndez	3:43
3.	"Ser O Parecer" (Original performance series)	Armando Ávila	3:28
4.	"Solo Quédate en Silencio" (Original performance series)	Arriaga	3:39
5.	"Tras de Mí" (Original performance series)	Lara; Karen Sokoloff; Damián	4:23
6.	"Tu Amor" (Original performance series)	Warren	4:31
7.	"The Making of Rebels" (Exclusive bonus video)		7:13
Total length:			31:31

Rebels – CD + DVD edition
No.	Title	Length
1.	"Making the video for "Tu Amor"
2.	"Exclusive interview with the band"
3.	"Behind the scenes recording of "Tu Amor" (Navidad Mix)
4.	"Tu Amor" (Music video + Band commentary)
5.	"Tu Amor" (Music video)

We Are RBD – Japanese/Deluxe edition
No.	Title	Writer(s)	Length
12.	"Let the Music Play"	Chris Barbosa; Ed Chisolm	4:57
13.	"Gone"	Kara DioGuardi; John Shanks	3:15
14.	"Money Money" (Spanish language bonus track)	Padilla "Wise"; Padilla "Luny"; Calo Cotto "Nales"; Peña "Doble A"	3:56
15.	"Tu Amor" (Navidad Mix)	Warren	4:36
16.	"Celestial" (4 song album sampler including "Ser O Parecer", "Dame", and "Bésame Sin Miedo")		2:00
Total length:			58:52

Notes

- "Let the Music Play" was originally recorded by American singer Shannon for her album of the same name (1984). Aside from being included on the Japanese deluxe edition of Rebels, the track was also featured as an iTunes digital download exclusive. The track was not included on the physical standard or bonus track editions of the album itself.

Miscellaneous notes

- In Walmart stores, the album came in a special edition that included an exclusive live EP containing original live performance songs by RBD and a bonus video of the making of Rebels.
- The Japanese edition of the album, named We Are RBD, is also the album's deluxe edition and came with 2 bonus tracks in addition to the standard Rebels tracklist, though the track order was slightly rearranged. The deluxe edition of the album also came with an autographed picture.
- An exclusive Fan Pack through Target stores included the Rebels album, a T-shirt, and buttons.
- The album included a free RBD 2007 calendar if purchased through K-Mart stores.
- If ordered through FYE.com, the album included a free RBD Rebels lithograph.

== Personnel ==
Credits adapted from the album's liner notes.

Recording locations

- Igloo Music Studios (Burbank, California)
- Ndahouse (Encino, California)
- Realsongs Studios D and W (Hollywood, California)
- Cosmos Studios 1 and 2 (Mexico City, Mexico)
- Studio 19 (Mexico City, Mexico)
- Integrated Studios (New York City)

Mixing locations

- Igloo Music Studios (Burbank, California)
- Realsongs Studios D and W (Hollywood, California)
- Cosmos Studios 1 and 2 (Mexico City, Mexico)
- AUM Studios (New York City)
- Integrated Studios (New York City)
- Plug in Tunes Studios (Queens, New York)

Mastered at

- Bernie Grundman Mastering (Hollywood, California)

Vocals

- RBD – main vocals, background vocals
- Armando Ávila – background vocals
- Martín Cintrón – background vocals
- Khris Kellow – background vocals
- Bambi – background vocals
- Carlos Murguía – background vocals
- Andy Vargas – background vocals

Musicians

- Armando Ávila – bass, drums, guitars, keyboards, Mellotron
- Abraham Laboriel – bass
- Javier Barrera – drums
- Greg Bissonette – drums
- Martín Cintrón – guitars
- Brian Kahanek – guitars
- Carlos Lara – guitars
- Güido Laris – guitars, keyboards
- RedOne – guitars, instruments
- Peter Stengaard – instruments
- Carlos Murguía – keyboards
- Javier Calderón – lead guitar

Production

- Chris Anokute – A&R
- Camilo Lara – A&R
- Melissa Mochulske – A&R
- Armando Ávila – arrangements, mixing, producer
- Khris Kellow – arrangements, producer, programming, vocal production
- Güido Laris – arrangements, programming
- Andrea Martin – arrangements, producer, vocal production
- Carlos Murguía – arrangements, programming
- RedOne – arrangements, drum programming, producer
- Peter Stengaard – arrangements, mixing, producer, programming
- Kate McGregor – art coordination
- Edward Taylor – art direction, graphic design
- Luis Luisillo Miguel – associate producer
- Lynda Thomas – background vocals direction
- Carolina Palomo – coordinator
- Sean Mosher-Smith – creative direction
- Carlos Lara – direction, lead vocal direction, producer, vocal production
- Mario Luccy – engineer, mixing, recording engineer
- Emilio Ávila – executive producer
- Pedro Damián – executive producer
- Michael Anthony Rodríguez – executive producer
- Diane Warren – executive producer
- Sara Klinger – executive producer assistant
- Televisa En Vivo – management
- Bernie Grundman – mastering
- Gustavo Borner – mixing, recording engineer
- Orlando Calzada – mixing, recording engineer
- Nick Nastasi – mixing assistant, producer, recording engineer, recording engineer assistant
- Marina Chávez – photography
- Los Presidentes – producers
- Luny Tunes – producers
- Evan V. McCulloch – producer
- Claydes Ahmad Smith – producer, vocal arrangement
- Ryan William Stokes – producer
- Rotger Rosas – production assistant
- Jorge González – production coordinator
- Tyler Coomes – programming
- Héctor Crisantes – recording engineer
- Brian Kahanek – recording engineer
- Juan Carlos Moguel – recording engineer
- Fernando Roldán – recording engineer
- Ignacio Segura – recording engineer assistant
- Ruy Fulguera – string arrangement
- Eric Archibald – styling
- Sergio Zamudio – vocal direction

== Charts ==
Charts	Peak Position
Mexican Albums Chart	74
Slovenian Albums (IFPI)	2
Spanish Albums Chart	1
US Billboard 200	40

== Certifications ==
Region	Certification	Certified units/sales
Mexico (AMPROFON)	Gold	50,000^{^}
^{^} Shipments figures based on certification alone.

== Release history ==
Region	Date	Format	Label
United States	December 19, 2006	(Standard edition) CD, digital download (Bonus track edition) CD, CD + DVD, digital download (Walmart edition) CD + EP	EMI Music, Virgin Records
Mexico	December 19, 2006	(Standard edition) CD, digital download	EMI Music, Virgin Records
Brazil	December 19, 2006	(Standard edition) CD, digital download	EMI Music, Virgin Records
France	March 5, 2007	(Standard edition, Bonus track edition) CD, digital download	EMI Music, Virgin Records
Japan	March 21, 2007	(We Are RBD Deluxe edition) CD, digital download	EMI Music, Virgin Records
Poland	November 24, 2008	(Standard edition) CD, digital download	EMI Music, Virgin Records
Greece	November 28, 2008	(Greek bonus track edition) CD, digital download	EMI Music, Virgin Records
