= Celestial (Versão Brasil) =

Studio album (reissue) by RBD
- Released: December 4, 2006
- Recorded: September 2006; Manaus, Brazil; São Paulo, Brazil
- Genre: Latin pop; teen pop
- Length: 38:17
- Language: Portuguese; Spanish
- Label: EMI
- Producer: Carlos Lara; Armando Ávila; Cláudio Rabello

RBD chronology
Celestial (2006)	Celestial (Versão Brasil) (2006)	Rebels (2006)

Singles from Celestial (Versão Brasil)
- 1. "Ser ou Parecer" Released: September 20, 2006

Celestial (Versão Brasil) (English: Heavenly (Brazil Version) and also known as Celestial (Versão Português) (EN: Heavenly (Portuguese Version) in 2020 limited version) is the third and final studio album in Portuguese by Mexican pop group RBD, released on December 4, 2006 through the EMI label. It is the Portuguese version of Celestial, RBD's third Spanish studio album. The record contains eight tracks in Portuguese, and three tracks from the original in Spanish. The album sold more than 600,000 copies throughout Brazil, Portugal and the United Kingdom.

== Background and release ==
With the end of the telenovela Rebelde, from which RBD originated, the group's members could finally dedicate more time to music. Thus, as in the previous Brazilian editions of the group's studio albums, the songs that made up the original Spanish version of Celestial were translated and adapted by Cláudio Rabello, under the direction of Pedro Damián.

During the group's Tour Generación RBD (in Brazil called Tour Brasil 2006), the group was adapting to the tour repertoire in Portuguese. Soon after, the group announced that they would record a Brazilian Portuguese edition of the Celestial album. Despite the group's willingness to please their Brazilian fanbase, RBD band member Alfonso Herrera revealed that singing in Portuguese "hurt" while training for the tour in the language.

As they had done the previous year, the group re-recorded their latest studio album at the time in Portuguese, and released it on December 4, 2006. This time, however, different to the group's previous Portuguese albums, the recording and initial promotion for the album were done in Brazil. Also different from the previous Portuguese editions was that the Spanish songs included on the album were re-recorded too, and slightly rearranged. Another difference is that this Portuguese edition was released in the same year as its Spanish counterpart, while the previous two (Rebelde (Edição Brasil) and Nosso Amor Rebelde) were recorded and released the year after their original albums' releases. The album was recorded in studios in Manaus and São Paulo. It was also released and marketed in the United Kingdom starting December 19, 2006.

== Single ==
"Ser Ou Parecer" was released as the album's only official single on September 20, 2006, and became RBD's final promotional single in Portuguese. The single was released only to radio to promote both versions of Celestial in Brazil. "Beija-me Sem Medo" was planned to be sent to Brazilian radio as well to serve as the album's second single, but the plan was eventually canceled.

== Track listing ==
Celestial (Versão Brasil)
No.	Title	Writer(s)	Length
1.	"Ser Ou Parecer"	Armando Ávila; Cláudio Rabello	3:33
2.	"Celestial"	Carlos Lara; Pedro Damián; Rabello	3:27
3.	"Talvez Depois"	Rick Nowels; Kara DioGuardi; Gregg Alexander; Rabello	3:06
4.	"Me Dar"	Lara; Rabello	4:04
5.	"Me Cansei"	Gabriel Esle; Carolina Rosas; Rabello	2:40
6.	"Sua Doce Voz"	Patrick Berger; DioGuardi; Rabello	3:18
7.	"Beija-me Sem Medo"	Chico Bennett; John Ingoldsby; Rabello	3:20
8.	"Quem Sabe"	Ángel Reyero; Ávila; Michkin Boyzo; Rabello	3:35
9.	"Es Por Amor" (Reworked version)	Sandra Baylac; Cachorro López; Sebastián Schon	3:16
10.	"Aburrida y Sola" (New version)	Lara	3:52
11.	"Algún Día" (New version)	Lara	4:06
Total length:			38:17

=== Translated songs ===
The tracks that were translated and recorded in Portuguese from their original Spanish language versions in the original album Celestial (2006) are:

- "Ser Ou Parecer" ("Ser O Parecer")
- "Celestial" ("Celestial")
- "Talvez Depois" ("Tal Vez Después")
- "Me Dar" ("Dame")
- "Me Cansei" ("Me Cansé")
- "Sua Doce Voz" ("Tu Dulce Voz")
- "Beija-me Sem Medo" ("Bésame Sin Miedo")
- "Quem Sabe" ("Quizá")

== Release history ==
Region	Date	Format	Label
Brazil	December 4, 2006	CD, digital download	EMI
United Kingdom	December 19, 2006	CD, digital download	EMI
