= Celestial (RBD song) =

2007 single by RBD

Single by RBD

from the album Celestial
- Language: Spanish
- English title: "Heavenly"
- Released: 13 March 2007
- Recorded: 2006
- Genre: Latin pop; Pop rock; teen pop
- Length: 3:28
- Label: EMI, Capitol
- Songwriters: Carlos Lara; Pedro Damián
- Producer: Carlos Lara

RBD singles chronology
"Tu Amor" (2006)	"Celestial" (2007)	"Bésame sin miedo" (2007)

"Celestial" is a song recorded by the Mexican pop group RBD for their third Spanish studio album of the same name. It was released on 13 March 2007 as the second single from the album.

== Composition and lyrics ==
The song was written by Carlos Lara and Pedro Damián and is a Latin pop song with elements of pop rock. Lyrically, it is about the band telling their ex-lovers that they will get over them, with Maite and Alfonso stating in the pre-chorus: "Pronto desde mis cenizas, me veras volar", (Eng.: "Soon from my ashes, you will see me fly"). During the chorus, the members tell their ex-partners that "Y tú no tienes alma" (Eng.: And you have no soul") because they don't know what love is. The song was written in the key of G major with a tempo of 120 BPMs.

== Release ==
"Celestial" was confirmed to be the second single from the album in January 2007 in Mexico. Originally, in 2006, "Bésame Sin Miedo" was to be released as the second single. Instead, plans were made to release "Bésame Sin miedo" in the rest of Latin America and release "Celestial" only in Mexico. Due to the band being too busy filming RBD: La Familia, promoting both albums (Celestial and Rebels) and touring around the world, plans to release "Bésame sin miedo" were postponed. Therefore, "Celestial" was released in Mexico in March 2007 and in the rest of Latin America the song was sent to radio at the end of April. The song's Portuguese version is also titled "Celestial - Versão Português", and was released as the second single from the album's Brazilian edition in the country.

== Music video ==
On February 11, 2007, RBD recorded the music video for "Celestial" nearby the Popocatépetl and Iztaccíhuatl volcanos in Mexico City. The video was directed by Esteban Madrazo, who also directed "Ser o Parecer". The group members wear hippie outfits in the video. On February 27, the music video premiered on Ritmoson Latino, a Televisa music channel in Mexico.

== Awards ==
Year	Ceremony	Award	Result
2008	Premios Juventud	Favorite Video	Nominated
2008	Premios Juventud	La Mas Pegajosa	Nominated

== Charts ==
Chart (2007)	Peak position
US Latin Pop Airplay (Billboard)	18

== Track listing ==
- Digital download
1. "Celestial" – 3:27
- Digital download / Portuguese version
1. "Celestial (Versão Português)" – 3:27

== Credits and personnel ==
- Alfonso Herrera – vocals
- Anahí – vocals
- Carlos Lara – producer, songwriter
- Christian Chávez – vocals
- Christopher von Uckermann – vocals
- Cláudio Rabello – song adaptation to Portuguese
- Dulce María – vocals
- Lynda Thomas – chorus vocals (uncredited)
- Maite Perroni – vocals
- Pedro Damián – songwriter
