= CD USA =

2006 American TV show

- Presented by: Becky Baeling; John Wynn; Jonathan Redford; Malikha Mallette
- Country of origin: United States
- Original language: English

Production
- Executive producer: Conor McAnally
- Producers: Nikki Varhely; D. Renard Young; Mike Yurchuk; Stephanie Sacco; Neil Mahoney
- Production locations: Tribune Studios, Los Angeles
- Running time: 60 minutes
- Production company: Blaze Television

Original release
- Network: The 101 Network
- Release: January 21, 2006

CD USA is an American music television series that was broadcast by The 101 Network in 2006. Adapted from the British television series CD:UK and premiering on January 21, 2006, the program featured interviews and performances with popular musicians. It was hosted by John Wynn, Becky Baeling, and Jonathan Redford, with Malikha Mallette as a New York-based contributor.

Serving as DirecTV's first original programming effort for The 101 Network, the series was produced in high definition from Tribune Studios by Blaze Television, who had also produced CD:UK. DirecTV ordered 52 weeks worth of episodes.

== Specials ==
On December 31, 2006, CD USA presented a live New Year's Eve special from Las Vegas, hosting the America's Party concert from the Fremont Street Experience. The concert featured performances by The All-American Rejects, Five for Fighting, Smash Mouth, and Rock Star Supernova among others.

== Artists who have performed on CD USA ==
- 10 Years - Wasteland, Paralyzing Kings
- Thirty Seconds to Mars - The Story
- Aly & AJ - Rush, Something More
- Army of Anyone - It Doesn't Seem to Matter
- Ashlee Simpson - L. O. V. E.
- The 88 - Hide Another Mistake
- Bow Wow - Fresh Azimiz
- Brooke Hogan (with Paul Wall)
- Buckcherry - Crazy Bitch, Everything, Next 2 You
- Busta Rhymes - Touch It
- Butch Walker & The Let's Go Out Tonites - Bethamphedamine
- Cartel - Honestly
- Cary Brothers - Ride
- Cherish - Do It to It
- Cheyenne Kimball - Hanging On
- Chicago
- Chingy - Pullin' Me Back
- Chris Brown - Run It!
- Christina Milian – Say I
- Clear Static - Out of Control
- Cute Is What We Aim For - Curse of Curves
- Damone - Out Here All Night
- Dan Band - Rock You Hard This Christmas
- Daniel Powter - Bad Day
- Danity Kane - Show Stopper
- Dem Franchise Boyz - I Think They Like Me
- E-40 - U And Dat (with T-Pain)
- Eighteen Visions - Victim
- Evans Blue - Cold (But I'm Still Here), Over
- Fall Out Boy - Sugar, We're Goin Down
- Family Force 5 - Love Addict, Kountry Gentleman
- Five for Fighting
- Flipsyde - Someday
- Flyleaf - Fully Alive
- Fort Minor - Where'd You Go, Remember the Name
- Frankie J - Priceless, That Girl
- The Game - One Blood
- Godsmack - Speak, Shine Down
- Goo Goo Dolls
- Gym Class Heroes - Cupid's Chokehold, The Queen and I
- Hawthorne Heights - Pens and Needles, Saying Sorry
- Head Automatica- Graduation Day
- Hellogoodbye - Here (In Your Arms)
- Hinder - Lips of an Angel
- Holly Brook - Giving it Up for You
- Hoobastank - Inside of You, The First of Me*
- Ill Niño- This is War
- Jack's Mannequin- The Mixed Tape
- Jagged Edge - Stunnas
- James Blunt - You're Beautiful (from UK studios)
- Jamie Kennedy and Stu Stone - Circle Circle Dot Dot, 1964
- Jesse McCartney - Right Where You Want Me
- Jeannie Ortega - Crowded
- JoJo - Too Little Too Late, This Time
- Jonas Brothers - Mandy, 6 Minutes
- Kelly Clarkson - Walk Away
- Kevin Federline - Lose Control
- Korn - Coming Undone
- KT Tunstall - Black Horse and the Cherry Tree, Suddenly I See
- LeToya Luckett - Torn, She Don't
- Lifehouse - Blind
- Mariah Carey feat. Jermaine Dupri - Get Your Number
- Matisyahu - King Without A Crown
- Mario Vazquez - Gallery
- McFly - I've Got You, 5 Colours in Her Hair, Obviously
- MercyMe - So Long Self
- Mis-Teeq - Scandalous
- Missy Higgins - Scar
- Morningwood - The Nth Degree
- Natasha Bedingfield - Unwritten, I Bruise Easily
- Ne-Yo - Sexy Love
- Nelly Furtado - Promiscuous (with Timbaland)
- Maneater
- New Found Glory - It's Not Your Fault
- OK Go - Here It Goes Again, Oh! Lately, It's So Quiet
- The Panic Channel - Teahouse of the Spirits
- Papa Roach - ...To Be Loved, Reckless
- P.O.D. - Goodbye for Now
- Powerman 5000 - Wild World
- The Pussycat Dolls - Stickwitu, Buttons, Wait a Minute
- Quietdrive - Rise from the Ashes
- The Red Jumpsuit Apparatus - Face Down
- Ray-J - One Wish
- Remy Ma - Conceited
- RBD - Tu amor, My Philosophy, Celestial, I Wanna Be the Rain, Ser O Parecer, Wanna Play, Save Me
- Rihanna - SOS, Unfaithful
- Robin Thicke - 2 the Sky, I Need Love, Wanna Love U Girl (with Pharrell)
- Rob Zombie - Thunder Kiss ’65
- Saving Jane - Girl Next Door
- Scott Stapp
- Seether - Remedy (Acoustic Version)
- She Wants Revenge - Tear You Apart
- Shawnna - Gettin' Some
- Sierra Swan - Copper Red
- Smash Mouth
- Sparta - Taking Back Control
- Starsailor - In the Crossfire, Keep us Together
- STEFY - Chelsea
- The Subways - Rock & Roll Queen
- The Click Five
- Switchfoot - We Are One Tonight, Oh! Gravity, Dirty Second Hands
- Three 6 Mafia - Side 2 Side
- T-Pain - I'm in Love with a Stripper
- Too Short - Blow the Whistle
- Trace Adkins - Honkey Tonk Badonkadonk
- Under the Influence of Giants - Mama's Room
- Van Hunt - Character
- The Veronicas - When It All Falls Apart, 4ever
- Veruca Salt - So Weird
- Wicked Wisdom - Bleed All Over Me
- Yellowcard - Lights and Sounds, Rough Landing, Holly, Ocean Avenue, Down on my Head
- Ying Yang Twins
- Young Jeezy - I Luv It
