= Tu Amor (RBD song) =

Single by RBD

from the album Rebels
- English title: "Your Love"
- Released: September 22, 2006
- Recorded: 2006
- Studio: Realsongs Studio D, Hollywood, California
- Genre: R&B; Latin pop
- Length: 4:37
- Label: Virgin
- Songwriter: Diane Warren
- Producer: Khris Kellow

RBD singles chronology
"Ser O Parecer" (2006)	"Tu Amor" (2006)	"Celestial" (2007)

Alternative covers
- Navidad Mix cover

- Chico Latino Remix cover

- Live version 2021

Music video
- "Tu Amor" on YouTube

"Tu Amor" is a song written by Diane Warren and recorded by American singer Jon B. for his second studio album Cool Relax (1997). It was later covered by Mexican pop group RBD. It was the first single released from their fourth and first English studio album, Rebels (2006). The lead vocals on "Tu Amor" are sung only by Christian Chávez with the Spanish interlude by Alfonso Herrera and Anahí, while the rest of the group provides background vocals on the choruses. "Tu Amor" is a romantic song with a melodic pop style and Latin music influences. The single continued to open doors for RBD, having commercial success in various countries including Japan, Romania, Slovenia, and France, where the group won an award for the song.

== Release ==
According to writer Diane Warren and Mediabase, the song was released to American radio on September 22, 2006, after having been leaked to the Internet before its release date. "Tu Amor" officially debuted on the On Air with Ryan Seacrest radio morning show on KIIS-FM in Los Angeles, California. According to AllMusic, the single was released on CD in the United States on November 24, 2006. The song was later featured on the telenovela Rebelde when it was aired on TV5 in the Philippines.

== Music video ==
The music video for "Tu Amor" was shot on a beach in Los Angeles, California. MTV Tres premiered the video on October 23, 2006, where it made its debut at number six on the Mi TRL music video countdown. The video was also aired on MTV Hits. The video shows the group enjoying a day at the beach singing and having fun, and later having a cozy bonfire at night.

Fans noticed that member Christopher Uckermann wasn't in any scenes with the group, and only appeared in solo shots. At the time, the reason given was that Uckermann was sick and therefore was not able to be on set the day of shooting. However, in November 2020, during a livestream with Maite Perroni, Chávez, and then-manager Guillermo Rojas, Uckermann revealed that he had a dispute with the producers, and was sent back to Mexico for a week as a form of "punishment". His scenes were later filmed and edited into the video.

== Live performances ==
In the 2006 edition of Walmart Soundcheck, a performance series by the Walmart retail chain to promote albums being released, the group performed "Tu Amor" for the first time. On November 24, 2006, after RBD's English interview on Yahoo! Music, the group also performed "Tu Amor". In 2007, the group appeared on the US music TV show CD USA to perform the single. Later, on July 25, 2007, the group performed "Tu Amor" on the acoustic music TV show Confesiones en Concierto on Ritmoson Latino. RBD's third worldwide concert tour, the Tour Celestial, which promoted both its namesake album and Rebels, also included performances of "Tu Amor" as part of its setlist. A performance of the song was included on the CD/DVD Hecho en España, recorded in Madrid and released in 2007. It was also included in the group's 2008 Tour del Adiós, which spawned the DVD Tournée do Adeus, released a year later. Chávez would perform the song without the group, and its instrumental leaned more towards a ballad-type song, with a piano accompaniment.

In December 2020, during the group's reunion show, Ser O Parecer: The Global Virtual Union, Chávez sung "Tu Amor", this time with pre-recorded backing vocals and a more "modern" beat. He performed a mariachi version of the song on select dates during the group's 2023 Soy Rebelde Tour, alternating between "Tu Amor" and the mashup "Quisiera Ser / I Wanna Be The Rain". During his performances of "Tu Amor", Chávez used a pink charro outfit, and gave speeches about accepting oneself, in support of the LGBTQ community, of which he is a part of as a gay man.

== Critical reception ==
Jason Birchmeier of AllMusic commented that "Tu Amor", the lead single from Rebels, was "perfect for the project" due to its "simplicity" and "production". He also complimented Christian Chávez' vocals, stating that he is "the most fluent singer in the group, with the chorus sung in unison by the group – it's a single tailor-made for Tres".

== Commercial performance ==
The song became RBD's second single to chart on the US Billboard Hot 100, where it reached position number 65, the highest peak of the group's career on the chart. In Japan, however, the song managed to hit number 30 on the country's singles chart.

== Formats and track listings ==
US CD single

1. "Tu Amor" (Radio Edit) – 3:50
2. "Tu Amor" (Album Version) – 4:37

US CD maxi-single

1. "Tu Amor" (Radio Edit) – 3:50
2. "Tu Amor" (Album Version) – 4:37
3. "Tu Amor" (Chico Latino Remix Radio Edit) – 3:28
4. "Tu Amor" (Music video)

Navidad Mix digital download (iTunes only)

1. "Tu Amor" (Navidad Mix) – 4:43

Virtual show

1. "Tu Amor" (En vivo)" – 4:37

== Credits and personnel ==
Recording locations

- Realsongs Studio D (Hollywood, California)
- Igloo Music Studios (Burbank, California) ("Navidad Mix")
- Studio 19 (Mexico City, Mexico) ("Navidad Mix")

Mixing locations

- Integrated Studios (New York City, New York)
- Realsongs Studio D (Hollywood, California) ("Navidad Mix")

Vocals

- Christian Chávez – lead vocals
- Khris Kellow – background vocals
- Martín Cintrón – background vocals

Musicians

- Martín Cintrón – guitars

Production

- Khris Kellow – arrangements, producer, programming, vocal production on "Navidad Mix"
- Diane Warren – executive producer
- Orlando Calzada – mixing
- Nick Nastasi – mixing assistant
- Tyler Coomes – programming
- Mario Luccy – engineer, mixing on "Navidad Mix"
- Michael Anthony Rodríguez – executive producer
- Sara Klinger – executive producer assistant
- Fernando Roldán – recording engineer ("Navidad Mix")
- Gustavo Borner – recording engineer ("Navidad Mix")
- Carlos Lara – vocal production ("Navidad Mix")

== Awards ==
Year	Ceremony	Award	Result
2007	Les Etolies Cherie FM (France)	Chanson Internationale De L'Anee (International Song of the Year)	Won
2007	Premios Mi TRL Awards (United States)	Favorite Video	Won

== Charts ==
Chart (2006)	Peak position
Hungary (Rádiós Top 40)	36
US Billboard Hot 100	65
US Radio Songs (Billboard)	51
US Pop Airplay (Billboard)	29
US Latin Pop Airplay (Billboard)	36

=== Year-end charts ===
Chart (2007)	Position
Brazil (Crowley)	50

== Release history ==
Region	Date
United States	September 22, 2006
United Kingdom	October 31, 2006
