= The Little Voice =

2000 single by Sahlene

Single by Sahlene

from the album It's Been a While
- B-side: "Hush Hush"
- Released: 2000
- Studio: Lifeline (Stockholm)
- Genre: Pop rock
- Length: 3:11
- Label: Roadrunner Arcade
- Songwriters: Patrik Berger; Kara DioGuardi
- Producers: Patrik Berger; Kara DioGuardi

Sahlene singles chronology
"The Little Voice" (2000)	"House" (2000)

Audio video
- "The Little Voice" on YouTube

"The Little Voice" is a song by Swedish musician Sahlene from her debut studio album, It's Been a While (2003). It was released as the lead single from the album in 2000, by Roadrunner Arcade Music. The song was written and produced by Patrik Berger and Kara DioGuardi. "The Little Voice" experienced minimal commercial success in Sweden, where it peaked at number 51 on the Swedish national record chart.

== Release ==
Although the single received airplay, Sahlene's record company went bankrupt before the release of her debut album, and the album was shelved. But, in 2003 she finally released her debut album It's Been a While, which contained "The Little Voice". "The Little Voice" had heavy promotion and an accompanying music video was also released. The music video features Sahlene in a laboratory like set, walking around and scenes of her performing the song is also shown.

== Track listings and formats ==
- CD single
1. "The Little Voice" – 3:11
2. "Hush Hush" – 4:38
- Maxi single
1. "The Little Voice" – 3:11
2. "Hush Hush" – 4:38
3. "The Little Voice" (Long 101 Treat) – 4:42
4. "The Little Voice" (Longer 101 Treat) – 7:24

== Credits and personnel ==
Credits and personnel are adapted from the It's Been a While album liner notes.

- Sahlene – lead vocals, backing vocals, vocal arrangement
- Patrik Berger – writer, producer, all instruments, programming
- Kara DioGuardi – writer, producer, backing vocals, vocal arrangement
- Bernard Löhr – mixing
- Björn Engelmann – mastering

== Charts ==
Peak chart positions of "The Little Voice"
Chart (2000)	Peak position
Sweden (Sverigetopplistan)	51

== Hilary Duff version ==
"Little Voice"

Single by Hilary Duff

from the album Metamorphosis
- Released: May 10, 2004
- Recorded: 2003
- Genre: Pop rock
- Length: 3:03
- Label: Buena Vista; Hollywood
- Songwriters: Kara DioGuardi; Patrik Berger
- Producers: Chico Bennett; Kara DioGuardi

Hilary Duff singles chronology
"Come Clean" (2004)	"Little Voice" (2004)	"Our Lips Are Sealed" (2004)

Audio video
- "Little Voice" on YouTube

American singer Hilary Duff recorded a version with some difference in the lyrics, called "Little Voice", for her second studio album, Metamorphosis (2003). It was released as the third and final single from the album on May 10, 2004. The single was only released outside the United States. The song was produced by Chico Bennett and DioGuardi. The song peaked at number twenty-nine in Australia and also peaked at eighteen in Netherlands.

=== Track listing ===
- Australian CD single
1. "Little Voice" — 3:03
2. "Party Up" (Dance Remix) — 3:43
- European CD single
1. "Little Voice" — 3:03
2. "Come Clean" (Cut to the Chase Club Mix – Radio Edit) — 3:43

=== Charts ===
Chart (2004)	Peak position
Australia (ARIA)	29
Canada (Nielsen SoundScan)	29
Netherlands (Dutch Top 40 Tipparade)	7
Netherlands (Single Top 100)	80

=== Release history ===
Release dates and formats for "Little Voice"
Region	Date	Format	Label	Ref.
Australia	May 10, 2004	CD single	Festival Mushroom	

== RBD versions ==
"Tu Dulce Voz"

Song by RBD

from the album Celestial & Celestial (Versão Brasil)
- Language: Spanish; Portuguese
- English title: "Your Sweet Voice"
- Genre: Latin pop; Pop rock
- Length: 3:19 (Spa. version); 3:20 (Pt. version)
- Songwriters: Kara DioGuardi; Patrik Berger
- Lyricists: Michkin Boyzo (Spa. version); Cláudio Rabello (Pt. version)
- Producer: Armando Ávila

Music video
- "Tu Dulce Voz" on YouTube

Music video
- "Sua Doce Voz on YouTube

Mexican pop group RBD recorded Spanish and Portuguese cover versions of "The Little Voice", titled "Tu Dulce Voz" and "Sua Doce Voz", for their third studio album, Celestial (2006) and its Portuguese-language version, Celestial (Versão Brasil) (2006), respectively. The song was adapted to Spanish by Michkin Boyzo, while the Portuguese version was written by Cláudio Rabello, both of whom had already adapted some songs for the band into their respective languages. Both versions were produced by Armando Ávila, one of the group's constant producers.

=== Formats ===
Digital download / Spanish version

1. "Tu Dulce Voz" – 3:19

Digital download / Portuguese version

1. "Sua Doce Voz" – 3:20

=== Credits and personnel ===
- Anahí - lead vocals
- Dulce María - lead vocals
- Maite Perroni - lead vocals
- Lynda Thomas - background vocals
