= RBD: La familia =

Television series

- Graphic logo
- Genre: Sitcom
- Created by: Pedro Damián
- Directed by: Pedro Damián
- Starring: Anahí; Dulce Maria; Alfonso Herrera; Christopher Uckermann; Christian Chávez; Maite Perroni
- Music by: RBD
- Opening theme: "The Family", RBD
- Country of origin: Mexico
- Original language: Spanish
- No. of seasons: 1
- No. of episodes: 13

Production
- Executive producer: Pedro Damián
- Producer: Pedro Damián
- Running time: 60 minutes (including commercials)

Original release
- Network: Sky One
- Release: March 14 – June 13, 2007

RBD: La Familia (also known as La Familia RBD) is a Mexican sitcom made by Televisa about the fictional lives of the Mexican musical group RBD. RBD and the producer, Pedro Damián, have stated that this sitcom is fictional and not really based on the real lives of the members of the singers/actors. The characters of the sitcom are not based on the soap opera Rebelde but are similar to the group's members.

Production finished in the first quarter of 2007, and RBD: La Familia debuted on March 14, 2007 on Sky One in Mexico. The show was also transmitted on Univision that same year. RBD: La Familia was announced to be broadcast on Univisions sister channel UniMas beginning July 1, 2015 replacing Rebelde re-runs at 8AM/7C.

The opening song for the sitcom is "The Family". "Quiero Poder", a song written and sung by Dulce Maria in Spanish, is heavily featured in the show, and is also included on the RBD: La Familia compilation album. Christopher Ückermann confirmed the show to be done after one season.

== Cast ==
=== Primary characters ===
- Alfonso Herrera as Poncho
- Anahí as Anny
- Christian Chávez as Chris
- Christopher von Uckermann as Ucker
- Dulce María as Dul
- Maite Perroni as Mai

=== Secondary characters ===
- Arap Bethke as Alvaro
- Mariana Ávila as Mimi
- Ari Borovoy as Axel
- Elvis Carranza as Robert
- Ximena Díaz as Fabiola

== Facts ==
The following statements have been announced regarding the series:

- Christian Chávez stated in On Air with Ryan Seacrest that he kissed Maite first in the show.
- The English theme song for the sitcom is called "The Family" sung by RBD. The song talks about how close the six friends are and how they will always be there for one another. The song was released in the Celestial Fan Edition album.
- According to IMDb, RBD: La Familia is the first Mexican TV show shot entirely in High Definition.
- The band said they had started recording a second season, but after separating in 2009, no announcements were made.
- The first season finale had two alternate endings, both shown on SKY México.
- On September 29, there was an RBD special that promoted RBD: La Familia on Univision.
- RBD La Familia premiered in the U.S. on October 6 at 7 pm on Univision. It was running every Saturday at 2 pm.
- RBD La Familia came out on DVD on December 14 in Mexico and Spain.
- RBD La Familia came out on DVD for US Market July 22, 2008.
- The show began airing on Kanal A in Slovenia on August 31, 2009, and ended on September 16, 2009. The timeslot for the show was the same as it was for Rebelde, which was Monday through Friday at 18.55 CET (6.55 pm).

== Episode list ==
No.	Title	Original release date
1	"¿De Verdad Son Besos de Mentira?"	March 14, 2007
At the request of their fans, RBD are closing their concerts with kisses between the created couples of the band. Behind the scenes, this demand creates a stressful environment between the six members of the band, all of which are reported on TV without their consent, by Lorena, a gossip hungry reporter. Things only get more complicated when Dulce, angered by the fact he stuck his tongue in her mouth, pushes Ucker and causes him an injury, leading him to meet Linda, a nurse on duty. Meanwhile, Poncho and his girlfriend, Fabiola, argue over Poncho's decision to continue kissing Annie in the concerts and May becomes obsessed with mouth hygiene. Each one of them will have to figure out, on their own, if the kisses mean something more to them, because they're only getting them in trouble.
2	"We Are Family"	March 28, 2007
The members of the band finally get a day off from work and each have plans to go somewhere downtown. Although she initially agrees to have dinner with Poncho, Annie cancels their plans in order to attend a party at Axel's home, where she is made fun of and mistreated by his wealthy family and friends. On the other hand, Poncho "celebrates" his anniversary with Fabiola, but the party is actually a set up by Fabiola's psychologist friends, who try to push his limits in order for him to embrace and verbalize his feelings. Dul goes to an art exhibition planning to "befriend" the photographer and Ucker goes to a club with one of his many girlfriends, but both end up disappointed for different reasons. May goes to a spiritual place to learn about gems, but encounters a scammer instead. In the end, Dul ends up at Ucker's apartment and they tell each other about how horrible their dates were, and go out for a night snack. Eventually, the six bandmembers bump into each other and have dinner together.
3	"El Que Quiera Azul Celeste... Que Se Acueste!"	April 4, 2007
RBD goes to a release party for their latest album Celestial. Dul noticed a hot guy and gets interested in him, especially his booty.
4	"Era Mi Primera Vez"	April 11, 2007
The band is at a gym. Annie and Dul still try to deal with the fact that May is a virgin. Chris overheard the girls talking about it and gets excited. The girls try to find a guy for May in the gym but end up finding none matching their expectations.
5	"Feliz Cumpleaños, Annie"	April 18, 2007
It's Annie's 24th birthday. She is depressed because she has no boyfriend. The rest of the band decide to throw a surprise party for her. Annie then gets even more depressed when both Tony and Axel show up. At the end, Annie and Axel become a couple, and Poncho is mad because the party went whack.
6	"Ni Tan Bueno, Ni Tan Malo"	April 25, 2007
Chris goes to a counselor(Fabiola, Poncho's girlfriend) trying to solve his sexual impotence problem. While waiting at Fabiola's office, he meets a girl called Daniela. Daniela helps him resolve his problem and the couple ends up having sex, but she claims to be disgusted afterwards and rans away. Chris then walks into Fabiola's office only to find her cheating on Poncho with one of her "friends".
7	"La Responsabilidad... De Ser un Irresponsable"	May 2, 2007
Axel breaks up with Annie. Ucker tells Dul that he was in love with her, but then acts as if he never told her anything.
8	"Bajo el Mismo Techo (Juntos y Revueltos)"	May 9, 2007
Since the guys' apartment is getting fixed, they have to momentarily move in with the girls. The girls soon regret ever opening their doors to them. The girls' apartment looks as if a tornado has just struck and it drives the three of them crazy. Meanwhile, Dul treats Ucker even worse than before and he tries to figure out the reason why. Chris tells Ucker and Annie that he saw Fabiola cheating on Poncho, then Annie tells Dul and May. The four pressure Chris to tell Poncho the truth about Fabiola. In the end, Chris is forced by all his friends to tell Poncho that Fabiola cheated.
9	"Reparaciones"	May 16, 2007
The aftermath of Chris telling Poncho the truth about his girlfriend leaves Poncho angry at friends and confused with Fabiola. Ucker and Dul both get their wisdom teeth pulled out and spend the entire day together, leading to the couple to share a kiss. However, they are interrupted when Chris comes in and talks about Ucker's new love interest, causing Dul to get angry and leave the room. Meanwhile, Annie gets angry when she learns that Poncho, despite Fabiola cheating on him, plans to forgive her.
10	"Bésame Sin Miedo"	May 23, 2007
The gang is caught in a haunted house while recording their new music video for "Bésame Sin Miedo". In the house there is a female ghost that lingers around waiting for her lover, who looks like Chris. At night, when they are shooting the video, the lights turn off and May explains that the ghost has been wanting to see the love of her life again, which freaks her friends out. Annie ends up stuck with Poncho when they ran away trying to avoid the ghosts and Dul and Ucker hide together. Annie and Poncho are horrified and Poncho admits to Annie that he thinks she's the most beautiful woman he's laid eyes upon and that he'd love her to be more than a friend or a sister, but Annie doesn't listen because she covered her ears out of fright. Ucker kissed on Dul, but runs off afterwards.
11	"Los Amigos de Mis Amigos, Son Mis Amigos"	May 30, 2007
Dul meets one of Ucker's friends who becomes interested in her. She feels attracted to him, but nothing happens because Ucker tells his friend that Dul has herpes. When she finds out about it, Dul demands Ucker tells his friend the truth and so he does to earns Dul's forgiveness. Poncho and Fabiola give each other their last farewells and break up. At the same time, Axel and Tony break up with Annie after realizing she was seeing both of them. Dul and Ucker's friend go out on a date and at the end of the day, he says something that angers her, causing her to punch him. Dul then reveals to Ucker that the friend reminded her of Ucker himself, which is why she actually liked him; but she figured, why have the copy (Ucker's friend), when she could have the original (Ucker)? Dul and Ucker end up kissing for at least 20 minutes, but both say to the other that it's just kissing and nothing more.
12	"Paparazzi"	June 6, 2007
The paparazzi find out where the band lives and decide to follow them hoping to land a story about them. Every member of RBD blames each other's partners as to why the paparazzi has figured out where they live. Poncho blames Annie's exes, Annie blames Poncho's ex, Ucker blames Dul's past lovers, Dul and Chris blame May's new mysterious guy, but at the end turns out it was Chris' crazy ex-lover (Daniela). While the gang is trying to escape from the paparazzi, Ucker and Dul try to flee to Cuernavaca together, but then are stuck in a closet where they almost have sex. Annie and Poncho almost kiss twice but the group kept on getting in the way. Later on, a rumor circulates through the media, claiming that Dul and Ucker are together (which is true) and she is expecting his baby, which is a lie. In the end, the group finds a way to get out their apartments by dressing up in costumes.
13	"Confesiones"	June 13, 2007
Final 1: The season finale. They all go to a wedding; 'German' tells May that he is gay. Annie tells Poncho she is in love with him, and he tells her he is in love with her too. Ucker and Dul kiss and end up making love to each other. Annie and Poncho kiss showing the love they have for each other but Fabiola (Poncho's older ex-girlfriend) tells him that she's pregnant with his child and he faints. Final 2: When German tells May he is gay, she starts saying she doesn't believe in all that stuff anymore, but then some other guy came to the same room and they both believed in the same stuff and fall in love at first sight. Annie and Poncho kiss as Fabiola arrives. She soon leaves and doesn't end Annie and Poncho's moment. While leaving, Fabiola touches her stomach, insinuating she's pregnant.
