= Surfing in Peru =

Peru is home to several notable surf locations, including Máncora and Puerto Chicama, the latter being recognized for having the world's longest left-hand point break, extending over 4 kilometers along the northern coast of Peru.

== Competitions ==
The country has hosted numerous international surfing competitions, such as the Peru International Surfing Championship, the 1965 World Surfing Championship, and the Peru National Surf Circuit.
