= Dame (RBD song) =

Single by RBD

from the album Celestial
- Language: Spanish
- English title: "Give Me"
- Released: 12 August 2007
- Recorded: 2006
- Genre: Latin pop; Dance-pop
- Length: 4:04
- Label: EMI
- Songwriter: Carlos Lara
- Producer: Pedro Damián

RBD singles chronology
"Bésame Sin Miedo" (2007)	"Dame" (2007)	"Inalcanzable" (2007)

"Dame" is a song recorded by Mexican pop group RBD for their third Spanish studio album Celestial (2006). It was written by Carlos Lara and produced by Pedro Damián. The song was sent to radio stations in the United States to see what the results would become. The song debuted in February 2007 at number 42 on the Billboard Hot Latin Songs in the US and peaked at number 38.

== Background and release ==
"Dame" was released alongside its parent album on 23 November 2006 as the third track. It was released as a single in the U.S. as a test of whether it would become a hit or not. The Portuguese version of the song was recorded and titled "Me Dar", included as the fourth track as part of Celestial (Versão Brasil), released for the fanbase in that country. "Dame" was also one of the seven tracks adapted for the group's first English-language studio album Rebels, released in December of the same year. This version was released under the name "My Philosophy" (Spa. "Mi Filosofía") and was also the album's third track.

== Live performances ==
During the Celestial World Tour, Uckermann and Herrera did a rap bridge after the second post-chorus. In The Live Nation Show this rap was done just by Christopher. The track was also included in the group's Empezar Desde Cero Tour 2008.

== Charts ==
Chart (2007)	Peak position
US Hot Latin Songs (Billboard)	38
US Latin Pop Airplay (Billboard)	14

== Track listing ==
- Digital download
1. "Dame" – 4:04
- Digital download / Portuguese version
1. "Me Dar" – 4:03
- Digital download / English version
1. "My Philosophy" – 4:07

== Credits and personnel ==
- Alfonso Herrera – vocals
- Anahí – vocals
- Carlos Lara – producer, songwriter
- Christian Chávez – vocals
- Christopher von Uckermann – chorus vocals
- Cláudio Rabello – song adaptation to Portuguese
- Dulce María – vocals
- Lynda Thomas – chorus vocals (uncredited)
- Maite Perroni – vocals
