= Walmart Soundcheck =

Series of musical performances and interviews

- Type: Subsidiary
- Industry: Music, retail
- Founded: 2006
- Headquarters: United States
- Area served: Worldwide
- Key people: Kevin Swint, Cameron Janes
- Products: Live music albums
- Parent: Walmart

Walmart Soundcheck was a series of musical performances and interviews released exclusively by Walmart, starting in 2006. Each recording consisted of a four-to-six-song set performed live, plus an interview, and was released as a digital album as well as played on televisions inside Walmart retail stores. The debut performances for the series were by rock bands Switchfoot and Yellowcard. Walmart later began a special series called Risers for less established artists.

In 2013, the Now That's What I Call Music! series released a full album of Soundcheck songs titled Now That's What I Call Soundcheck.

== Performances ==
=== 2006 ===
Artist	Release date	Ref
Yellowcard	February 1, 2006	
Switchfoot	March 1, 2006	
Ne-Yo	2006	
Rascal Flatts	April 4, 2006	
Miranda Lambert	March 14, 2006	
Jewel	May 2, 2006	
Keyshia Cole	2006	
Goo Goo Dolls	April 25, 2006	
Nelly Furtado	June 20, 2006	
Julie Roberts	June 27, 2006	
Five for Fighting	2006	
John Mayer	2006	
Clay Aiken	2006	
Diddy	2006	
RBD	November 14, 2006	
Sugarland	2006	

=== 2007 ===
Artist	Release date	Ref
Norah Jones	2007	
Pretty Ricky	January 2007	
Fall Out Boy	2007	
John Mellencamp	2007	
Joss Stone	2007	
Good Charlotte	2007	
Avril Lavigne	April 20, 2007	
Calle 13	2007	
Jennifer Lopez	2007	
Linkin Park	2007	
Maroon 5	2007	
Big & Rich	March 7, 2007	
Toby Keith	2007	
Bon Jovi	2007	
Mandy Moore	June 2007	
Enrique Iglesias	2007	
Chris Cornell	July 12, 2007	
Chris Brown	2007	
James Blunt	2007	
Foo Fighters	2007	
Rascal Flatts	2007	
Josh Turner	2007	
Little Big Town	2007	
Jason Aldean	2007	
Rihanna	November 7, 2007	
Wyclef Jean	December 4, 2007	
Rodrigo y Gabriella	December 18, 2007	
Natasha Bedingfield	2007	
RBD	November 15, 2007	
Lenny Kravitz	2007	
Matchbox Twenty	November 26, 2007	

=== 2008 ===
Artist	Release date	Ref
Lenny Kravitz	February 2, 2008	
Simple Plan	February 22, 2008	
Sara Bareilles	March 14, 2008	
Colbie Caillat	March 28, 2008	
Sheryl Crow	April 11, 2008	
Panic at the Disco	May 5, 2008	
Ashanti	June 13, 2008	
Danity Kane	April 25, 2008	
Paramore	2008	
Ne-Yo	June 27, 2008	
Yuridia	July 1, 2008	
The Cheetah Girls	July 16, 2008	
The Laurie Berkner Band	August 15, 2008	
The Pussycat Dolls	September 12, 2008	
New Kids on the Block	August 29, 2008	
Jennifer Hudson	2008	
Jenni Rivera	September 12, 2008	
Solange	September 12, 2008	
Gym Class Heroes	August 18, 2008	
Beyonce	November 14, 2008	
Dave Cook	November 28, 2008	
Nickelback	December 12, 2008	
All American Rejects	December 26, 2008	
Lee Ann Womack	November 30, 2008	
Val Emmich	November 24, 2008	

=== 2009 ===
Artist	Release date	Ref
Martina McBride	January 16, 2009	
Hinder	February 27, 2009	
The Fray	February 13, 2009	
India.Arie	March 13, 2009	
Kelly Clarkson	March 17, 2009	
Martina McBride: In Concert	April 10, 2009	
Rascal Flatts	April 24, 2009	
Lil Wayne	May 12, 2009	
Jonas Brothers	November 10, 2009	
Mandy Moore	2009	
Demi Lovato	November 10, 2009	
Black Eyed Peas	December 1, 2009	
Adele	March 15, 2009	
Paulina Rubio	July 10, 2009	
Ashley Tisdale	August 14, 2009	
Rob Thomas	July 3, 2009	
Lady Gaga	May 31, 2009	
Colbie Caillat	September 28, 2009	
Mitch Musso	May 22, 2009	
Keri Hilson	August 14, 2009	
Reba McEntire	September 11, 2009	
Miranda Lambert	September 25, 2009	
Shakira	September 25, 2009	
Creed	October 15, 2009	
American Idols	November 13, 2009	
Carrie Underwood	November 6, 2009	
Norah Jones	November 2009	
OneRepublic	December 15, 2009	

=== 2010 ===
Artist	Release date	Ref
Corinne Bailey Rae	January 26, 2010	
Nelly Furtado	October 2010	
Maroon 5	November 2010	
Allstar Weekend	June 15, 2010	
Mary J. Blige	February 2010	
Camp Rock 2	August 10, 2010	
Katy Perry	December 15, 2010	
Blake Shelton	August 2010	
Josh Turner	2010	
Josh Groban	December 2010	
Melanie Fiona	2010	

=== 2011 ===
Artist	Release date	Ref
Adele	February 15, 2011	
Avril Lavigne	March 2011	
David Cook	June 14, 2011	
Boyz II Men	October 14, 2011	
Mana	May 1, 2011	
Lupe Fiasco	2011	
The Script	2011	
Pitbull	July 2011	
Keith Urban	2011	
Chris Cornell	2011	

=== 2012 ===
Artist	Release date	Ref
Ne-Yo	November 2012	
Nelly Furtado	September 2012	
Trey Songz	August 2012	
Josh Turner	2012	

=== 2013 ===
Artist	Release date	Ref
Selena Gomez	August 2013	
Five Finger Death Punch	August 2013	
Bon Jovi	2013	
Keith Urban	2013	
Phillip Phillips	December 2013	

=== 2014 ===
Artist	Release date	Ref
Lea Michele	March 2014	
Magic!	2014	
Seether	2014	
Lenny Kravitz	September 23, 2014	

=== 2015 ===
Artist	Release date	Ref
Fall Out Boy	2015	

=== Risers performances ===

Artist	Release date	Ref
Parachute	August 2009	
The JaneDear girls	February 2011	
The Black Keys	March 2011	
Kimberly Caldwell	April 2011	
Mindless Behavior	October 2011	
David Nail	December 2011	
Kip Moore	May 2012	
Jana Kramer	August 2012	
Ed Sheeran	January 2013	
Florida Georgia Line	February 2013	
Tegan and Sara	June 2013	
Sick Puppies	July 15, 2013	
Emblem3	August 2013	
Olly Murs	2013	
Tyler Bryant & The Shakedown		
Tyler Farr		
We Are the Fallen		
We the Kings		
Zion I		
