= Bésame sin miedo =

"Bésame Sin Miedo"

Single by RBD

from the album Celestial
- Language: Spanish
- English title: "Kiss Me Without Fear"
- Released: 8 June 2007
- Recorded: 2006
- Genre: Pop rock; dance-pop
- Length: 3:31
- Label: EMI
- Songwriters: Chico Bennett; Jon Ingoldsby; Carlos Lara
- Producer: Carlos Lara

RBD singles chronology
"Celestial" (2007)	"Bésame Sin Miedo" (2007)	"Dame" (2007)

Audio sample
- file; help

Music video
- "Bésame Sin Miedo" on YouTube

"Bésame Sin Miedo" is a song recorded by Mexican pop group RBD for their third studio album Celestial (2006). The Portuguese version of the song appears on Celestial (Versão Brasil) (2006).

== Release ==
"Bésame Sin Miedo" is the third single from the RBD album Celestial (2006). The song is a cover of American singer Sara Paxton's song "Kiss Me Like You Mean It", released in 2005. The track was sent to Latin radio stations in early August. The song was promoted more than the previous single "Celestial" in the U.S., with the band touring in the U.S.. In the U.S., the group premiered the song at the 2007 Premios Juventud. Its Portuguese version, titled "Beija-me Sem Medo", is the seventh track on its parent album, but was not released as a single in Brazil.

== Music videos ==
Two music videos were shot for the song. The first is the official music video, which was filmed in Transylvania while the group was touring in Europe. It was shot on 13 June at Bran Castle, better known as Dracula's Castle, in Transylvania, Romania. The music video was released on 28 August 2007, on OpenDisc, and was officially released on the next day on the Official RBD website. The video starts off with RBD in a bus heading to Dracula's Castle. On the way, the band pick up some people and take them along. In the Castle, the group sits around playing "spin the bottle," and then begin kissing their romantic partners one by one. It ends with Anahi getting bit by her partner, who turns out to be the owner and a vampire.

The second music video is the one the band made as part of the tenth episode of their sitcom RBD: La familia, and features an appearance of Rebelde cast member Felipe Nájera, playing the clip's strict director. This version features the group in an old house, which is shown to be haunted.

== Chart performance ==
On the Billboard Latin Pop Airplay chart, the song peaked at number eight for two weeks. On the magazine's Hot Latin Songs chart, it reached its peaked position of number 30.

== Charts ==
Chart (2007)	Peak position
Costa Rica (Monitor Latino)	5
US Hot Latin Songs (Billboard)	30
US Latin Pop Airplay (Billboard)	8
Panama (Notimex)	1

== Track listing ==
- Digital download
1. "Bésame Sin Miedo" – 3:31
- Digital download / Portuguese version
1. "Beija-me Sem Medo" – 3:21

== Credits and personnel ==
- Alfonso Herrera – vocals
- Anahí – vocals
- Carlos Lara – producer, song adaptation to Spanish
- Chico Bennett – original songwriter
- Christian Chávez – vocals
- Christopher von Uckermann – vocals
- Cláudio Rabello – song adaptation to Portuguese
- Dulce María – vocals
- Jon Ingoldsby – original songwriter
- Lynda Thomas – harmony, chorus vocals (uncredited)
- Maite Perroni – vocals
