= Jack Ingoldsby =

Canadian ice hockey player

- Born: June 21, 1924 Toronto, Ontario, Canada
- Died: August 10, 1982 (aged 58) Oakville, Ontario, Canada
- Height: 6 ft 2 in (188 cm)
- Weight: 210 lb (95 kg; 15 st 0 lb)
- Position: Right wing
- Shot: Right
- Played for: Toronto Maple Leafs
- Playing career: 1941–1960

John Gordon Ingoldsby (June 21, 1924 – August 10, 1982) was a Canadian professional ice hockey player. He played 29 games in the National Hockey League with the Toronto Maple Leafs from 1942 to 1944. In 1924, he weighed 210 pounds (95 kg) at 6 feet 2 inches (1.88 m). Ingoldsby retired from playing hockey in 1960 and died in Oakville, Ontario, on August 10, 1982, at the age of 58.

== Career ==
In 1941 and 1942, Ingoldsby played Junior B Hockey for De La Salle Academy in Toronto. On November 18, 1942, he was signed as a free agent by Toronto. In 1943, he played the following season at two schools; half at the Providence Rds and Toronto Maple Leafs. By the end of 1943 and through 1944, he had returned to De La Salle Academy. The 29 games, of which his career in the NHL consisted, were for the Leafs where he accumulated five goals and one assist.

Later, Ingoldsby played senior hockey for the Toronto Staffords in 1945 and 1946. Immediately after, from 1947 to 1953, he played for the Owen Sound Mercurys. He won the Allan Cup with the Mercurys in 1951.

In 1953 he played in the International Hockey League and the Eastern Hockey League and moved to the minor pros. Jack Ingoldsby retired in 1960.

== Career statistics ==
=== Regular season and playoffs ===
			Regular season					Playoffs
Season	Team	League	GP	G	A	Pts	PIM	GP	G	A	Pts	PIM
1941–42	De La Salle College	OHA-B	8	15	5	20	16	3	0	2	2	0
1942–43	Toronto Maple Leafs	NHL	8	0	1	1	0	—	—	—	—	—
1942–43	Providence Reds	AHL	24	10	12	22	2	2	0	0	0	0
1943–44	Toronto Maple Leafs	NHL	21	5	0	5	15	—	—	—	—	—
1943–44	Toronto CIL	TIHL	4	4	3	7	0	—	—	—	—	—
1943–44	Toronto Army Daggers	OHA Sr	—	—	—	—	—	2	3	2	5	0
1944–45	Toronto Uptown Tires	TMHL	16	5	11	16	9	—	—	—	—	—
1945–46	Toronto Staffords	OHA Sr	11	3	8	11	10	—	—	—	—	—
1945–46	Toronto Maher Jewels	TIHL	13	11	5	16	24	10	10	3	13	7
1947–48	Owen Sound Mercurys	OHA Sr	36	7	17	24	24	5	7	6	13	4
1948–49	Owen Sound Mercurys	OHA Sr	37	17	14	31	27	4	0	1	1	0
1949–50	Owen Sound Mercurys	OHA Sr	26	9	6	15	17	—	—	—	—	—
1950–51	Owen Sound Mercurys	OHA Sr	44	19	35	54	18	7	2	3	5	6
1950–51	Owen Sound Mercurys	Al-Cup	—	—	—	—	—	16	15	9	24	18
1952–53	Owen Sound Mercurys	OHA Sr	44	19	35	54	18	7	2	3	5	6
1953–54	Marion Barons	IHL	61	19	18	37	30	5	0	1	1	10
1954–55	Grand Rapids Rockets	IHL	59	13	24	37	18	4	0	0	0	0
1955–56	Grand Rapids Rockets	IHL	58	16	30	46	18	—	—	—	—	—
1956–57	Huntington Hornets	IHL	60	18	10	28	6	4	3	1	4	0
1957–58	New Haven Blades	EHL	50	26	31	57	65	6	2	2	4	2
1958–59	New Haven Blades	EHL	64	15	23	38	8	5	1	0	1	0
1959–60	New Haven Blades/Charlotte Checkers	EHL	40	8	15	23	18	—	—	—	—	—
IHL totals			238	66	82	148	72	13	3	2	5	10
NHL totals			29	5	1	6	15	—	—	—	—	—

== Awards ==
- Allan Cup - 1951
