= Este corazón =

2006 single by RBD

"Este Corazón"

Single by RBD

from the album Nuestro Amor
- Language: Spanish
- English title: "This Heart"
- Released: 11 March 2006
- Recorded: 2005
- Genre: Latin pop; Soft rock; Sentimental ballad
- Length: 3:29
- Label: EMI
- Songwriter: Armando Ávila
- Producers: Armando Ávila; Pedro Damián (executive)

RBD singles chronology
"Tras De Mí" (2006)	"Este Corazón" (2006)	"México, México" (2006)

Audio video
- "Este Corazón" on YouTube

"Este Corazón" is a song recorded by Mexican pop group RBD. It was released as the fourth and last official single from their second studio album, Nuestro Amor (2005) and third radio single. The song was used as the second opening of the third season of the telenovela Rebelde. Despite having a Portuguese version, it was not released to radio in Brazil. It peaked at number 10 on Billboard's Hot Latin Songs Chart.

== Background and release ==
RBD (formed by Anahí, Dulce María, Maite Perroni, Alfonso Herrera, Christopher von Uckermann, and Christian Chávez) released their second studio album Nuestro Amor in September 2005, to great success. "Este corazón" was released in March 2006 to Mexican radio stations, as the album's fourth and last single. It was used as the second intro to the Mexican telenovela Rebelde during its third season. The band recorded the song in Portuguese, under the name "Esse Coração", as part of Nosso Amor Rebelde, the Brazilian version of their second album, adapted by Cláudio Rabello. It was released as the fourth and final single of the Portuguese album on 5 November 2006.

== Composition and lyrics ==
"Este Corazón" is a Latin pop, soft rock, and sentimental ballad that lasts three minutes and twenty-nine seconds. It was composed by Armando Ávila who also produced the track alongside Pedro Damián, and is written from the point of view of the group's characters in the telenovela. It is set in the verse-chorus form, with a small bridge before the third chorus. It is written in the key of G major with a tempo of 160 BPMs.

Christopher opens the song solo, asking a former lover "How can I regain your love?", and says "My world only spins because of you". Dulce then joins him, as they both ask "How can I heal this deep pain?", with Dulce singing "I'm so connected to you". They both end the first verse claiming "That even in my dreams I see you, without you I die".

The chorus features all the members, with Maite and Christopher singing the lead vocals and Dulce doing double voice with two different tones. The band sings: "Y este corazón que te robaste cuando te marchaste [...] con mis besos y mis sueños / Y este corazón esta latiendo cada vez mas lento / Y estoy sintiendo en mis adentros / Cómo el fuego no se apagó" ("And this heart that you stole when you left [...] with my kisses and my dreams / And this heart that's beating more slow each time / And I'm feeling inside me / How the fire did not go out").

The second verse starts with Alfonso and Anahí asking how to "calm this deep obsession? / How do I explain to my soul that it's over?". Alfonso puts a spin on Dulce's line, instead saying "I'm going crazy for you"), while Anahí makes the same claim as the first duo.

During the bridge, both boys alongside Anahí sing, with Christian and Christopher doing a background vocal after the first line, and Christian fully joining them with an ad-lib on the third line. They sing "It keeps burning / As long as love exists / Love doesn't burn out". Anahí then sings an ad-lib, and does two more during the last chorus.

== Music video ==
On February 14, 2006, the show's producers surprised the audience with the premiere of the opening video featuring the band performing the song. The video was only used as the second opening in the telenovela's third season, and no official video was recorded.

== Chart performance ==
Although the song had not been officially released in the United States, it managed to debut on the Billboard Hot Latin Songs at #96. It became a hit on the U.S. radio, being named a "Hot Shot" on the Hot Latin Songs on June 13, 2006, when it climbed 57 spots from #96 to #39 in one week. The song reached its peak on the chart at number 10.

It was nominated by the public as one of the most romantic songs of the year for Univision's trendy Premios Juventud, which aired on July 13, 2006. It won the awards show's category of "Canción Corta-Venas" (Eng. "Best Ballad"; literal translation "Vein-Cutter Song").

== Award ==
Year	Ceremony	Award	Result	Ref.
2008	Premios Juventud	Canción Corta-Venas	Won	

== Track listing ==
- Digital download
1. "Este Corazón" – 3:29
- Digital download / Portuguese version
1. "Esse Coração" – 3:28

== Credits and personnel ==
- Alfonso Herrera – vocals
- Anahí – vocals
- Armando Ávila – songwriter, producer
- Christian Chávez – vocals
- Christopher von Uckermann – vocals
- Cláudio Rabello – song adaptation to Portuguese
- Dulce María – vocals
- Lynda Thomas – chorus vocals (uncredited)
- Maite Perroni – vocals
- Pedro Damián – executive producer

== Charts ==
Chart (2006)	Peak position
US Hot Latin Songs (Billboard)	10
US Latin Pop Airplay (Billboard)	3
