= Ser o Parecer =

Single by RBD

from the album Celestial
- Language: Spanish
- English title: "To Be or to Seem"
- Released: September 18, 2006
- Recorded: 2006
- Genre: Latin pop; dance-pop; teen pop
- Length: 3:31
- Label: EMI
- Songwriter: Armando Ávila
- Producer: Ávila

RBD singles chronology
"No pares" (2006)	"Ser o Parecer" (2006)	"Tu Amor" (2006)

Audio sample
- file; help

Alternative covers
- Portuguese version artwork

- Remix artwork

Music video
- "Ser o Parecer" on YouTube

"Ser o Parecer" is a song by Mexican pop group RBD from their third studio album, Celestial. It was released on September 18, 2006, as the album's lead single. The group recorded a Portuguese version of the song for Celestial (Versão Brasil), which was released two days later.

== Background and release ==
"Ser O Parecer" was written and produced by Armando Ávila. It was released on 18 September 2006, as the lead single from their third studio album, Celestial. Its Portuguese version "Ser Ou Parecer" was released two days later, on 20 September, also as the lead single for the Brazilian market. The group performed the song live for the first time on October 8, during their concert in Rio de Janeiro, as part of their tour through Brazil, which was filmed and recorded and released on 2 February 2007 as their third live material, under the title Live in Rio.

== Composition and lyrics ==
The song narrates a classic story of unrequited love; it is sung from the point of view of a girl who has fallen for a guy that never pays any attention to her. The lyrics of the song describe the girl's unsuccessful attempts to catch the guy's attention and "despertar el interés vacío", or "awaken the empty interest". The song is written in the key of D-flat major over a tempo of 176 BPMs.

== Chart performance ==
In the United States, "Ser o Parecer" debuted and peaked at position number 84 on the Billboard Hot 100 on the week ending December 16, 2006. On the Hot Latin Songs chart, "Ser o Parecer" entered at number five on the week ending October 28, 2006. In its six-weeks run on the chart, the single climbed to the top position of the chart on the week ending December 2, 2006, topping the chart for two consecutive weeks. "Ser o Parecer" stayed within the top-ten positions of the chart for fifteen consecutive weeks, from October 2006 to February 2007.

== Music video ==
EMI announced on October 2, 2006, that the accompanying music video for "Ser o Parecer" was finished. EMI Televisa Music officially released the video on YouTube. It was directed by Esteban Madrazo and filmed in São Paulo, Brazil while the group was touring the country.

The video features all of the members of the group in trashy, post-grunge attire. The video illustrates how the members changed from regular celebrities to international superstars. In addition, it features CGI monster-like creatures on the streets along with the group.

== Awards and nominations ==
Year	Ceremony	Award	Result
2007	Premios Juventud	La Más Pegajosa	Nominated
2007	Premios Juventud	Video Favorito	Nominated
2007	Orgullosamente Latino Award	Canción del Año	Nominated
2007	Orgullosamente Latino Award	Video Latino del Año	Nominated

== Charts ==
=== Weekly charts ===
Chart (2006–07)	Peak position
Panama (EFE)	9
Romania (Airplay 100)	7
US Billboard Hot 100	84
US Hot Latin Songs (Billboard)	1
US Latin Pop Airplay (Billboard)	1
US Latin Rhythm Airplay (Billboard)	8
US Latin Tropical Airplay (Billboard)	10
US Regional Mexican Airplay (Billboard)	16

=== Year-end charts ===
Chart (2007)	Position
Romania (Airplay 100)	65

== Track listing ==
- Digital download
1. "Ser O Parecer" – 3:31
- Digital download / Portuguese version
1. "Ser Ou Parecer" – 3:34
- Digital download / Remix version
1. "Ser O Parecer (Remix)" – 6:32

== Credits and personnel ==
- Alfonso Herrera – chorus vocals
- Anahí – vocals
- Armando Ávila – producer, songwriter
- Christian Chávez – chorus vocals
- Christopher von Uckermann – chorus vocals
- Cláudio Rabello – song adaptation to Portuguese
- Dulce María – vocals
- Maite Perroni – vocals
