= Soy Rebelde Tour =

2023 concert tour by RBD

- Continental tour by RBD
- Location: North America; South America
- Associated albums: Various
- Start date: August 25, 2023
- End date: December 21, 2023
- Legs: 1
- No. of shows: 54
- Producers: Live Nation; T6H Entertainment; OCESA
- Attendance: 2.000.000
- Box office: $231.7 million
- Website: soyrebelde.world

RBD concert chronology
- Gira Del Adiós (2008); Soy Rebelde Tour (2023)

The Soy Rebelde Tour (English: I'm Rebellious Tour) was the fifth concert tour by Mexican pop group RBD. The tour had stops in North and South America, beginning on August 25, 2023, at Sun Bowl Stadium in El Paso, Texas, concluding on December 21, 2023, at Estadio Azteca, Mexico City.

This tour marked the group's first since their Gira Del Adiós (2008) took place fifteen years prior, which commemorated a previous disbanding. The sold out tour became the second highest-grossing tour by a Latin artist during its run with over $231 million in box office receipts, and ranks at number six as of May 2026.

== Background ==
Following their successful virtual quarantine concert in 2020, rumors about a reunion began. On December 19, 2022, RBD's official social media outlets uploaded a video captioned "Soy Rebelde!!!". The members, minus Alfonso Herrera, changed their profile pictures to a black background with the band's logo in white. Along with the video post, a website was created that showcased a countdown and a sign-up form, along with the phrase “Prepara tu corbata, Enero 19 2023” (“prepare your tie, January 19, 2023”).

On January 19, 2023, a 3-minute video confirming a reunion tour was displayed in public spaces across such cities as Los Angeles, New York City, Chicago, São Paulo, Río de Janeiro and Mexico City where fans gathered to witness the announcement. Titled Soy Rebelde Tour, it initially comprised 26 dates and was scheduled to begin on August 25, 2023, from El Paso and continue throughout the U.S., Brazil and Mexico, ending on December 2, 2023, in Mexico City.

Due to a massive demand for concert dates in more Latin American countries, the group surprised fans in Colombia with an announcement on February 13, 2023. On the scheduled day, a concert date in Medellín was finally announced, with fans reuniting at the Provenza sector to watch the announcement via video broadcast.

== Commercial performance ==
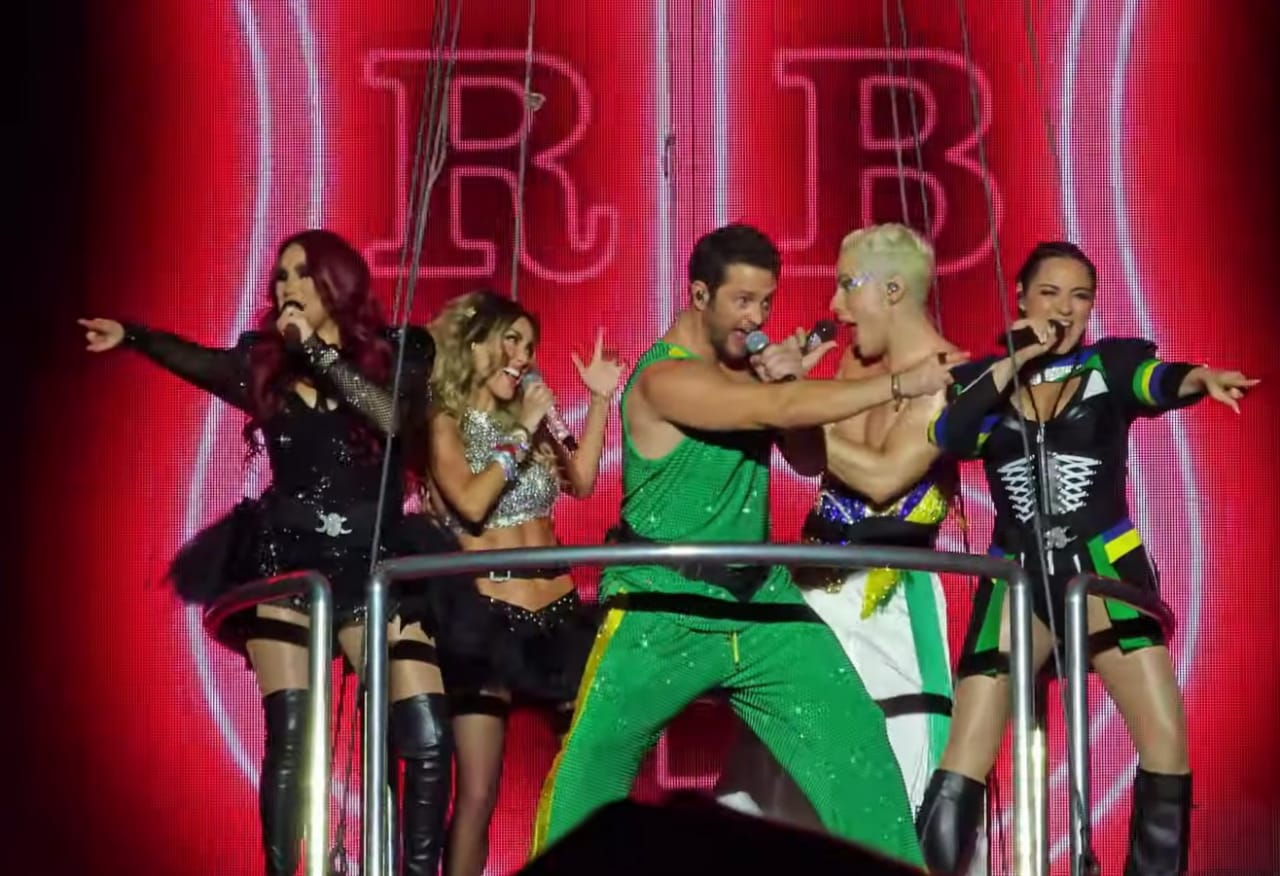
RBD performing "Tras de Mí" during their first show in Rio de Janeiro, Brazil.

The announcement of the tour led to a commercial success. On January 20, a second date was added in Los Angeles, while additional dates in New York City, Chicago, Glendale, Miami, Edinburg and San Diego were added five days later. The group scheduled a total of four concerts at the BMO Stadium in Los Angeles. A new date in Monterrey was announced on January 27, and consequently, another one in Guadalajara on January 31. On March 23, a third date was revealed for Monterrey. It also broke records for the most shows on a single tour at the Foro Sol, with six overall, and revenue sales in Mexico City, previously held by Bad Bunny with The World's Hottest Tour and Daddy Yankee with La Última Vuelta World Tour.

During the presale in Brazil, all tickets available were sold under six minutes. The general sale in São Paulo was met with "overwhelming" demand, with approximately 600,000 people trying to get tickets, prompting the addition of a second and third dates. On March 27, a second date for Rio de Janeiro was announced along with three brand new dates in São Paulo, with a fourth one at the Allianz Parque and two additional at the Estádio do Morumbi in order to fulfill the demand. The CEO of CTS Eventim in Brazil, responsible for selling tickets, has said this was the biggest challenge the company has faced in the country.

For the initial concert in Medellín, a presale was scheduled to happen on February 15, with the general sale to occur two days later. However, during the presale 225,000 people attempted to purchase tickets, causing the website of eTicket Colombia to crash. On February 16 and 20, a second and third date were added, respectively. The first two dates were sold out within hours of tickets being released, with the third date being sold out in 50 minutes. On February 25, a fourth and final date in Medellín was announced. Furthermore, flights and hotel room prices soared for the concert dates.

=== Venue records ===
List of venue-based achievements for 2023, showing dates, venue and description
Dates (2023)	Venue	Description	Ref.
7 and 8 September	Guaranteed Rate Field	First act in history to perform two shows on a single tour.	
12 and 13 September	Desert Diamond Arena	First Spanish-speaking act in history to perform two shows on a single tour.	
18–20 and 22 October	BMO Stadium	First act in history to perform three shows on a single tour.	
18–20 and 22 October	BMO Stadium	First act in history to perform four shows on a single tour.	
3–6 November	Estadio Atanasio Girardot	First act in history to perform four shows on a single tour.	
3–6 November	Estadio Atanasio Girardot	Fastest ticket sales ever in Colombia.	
9 and 10 November	Estádio Olímpico Nilton Santos	First Spanish-speaking act in history to perform two shows on a single tour.	
12 and 13 November	Estádio do Morumbi	First Spanish-speaking act in history to perform two shows on a single tour.	
16–19 November	Allianz Parque	First Spanish-speaking act in history to perform four shows on a single tour.	
16–19 November	Allianz Parque	Concert tour with most consecutive shows.	
23, 24 November and 12 December	Estadio Mobil Super	First act in history to perform three shows on a single tour.	
30 November, 1–3, 16 and 17 December	Foro Sol	First act in history to perform six shows on a single tour.	

== Impact ==
On January 23, 2023, Billboard dedicated a list of potential songs they would like to hear, in which the 2005 hit single "Sálvame" was placed at the top spot. Publications such as Forbes' The Happening, The Guardian's La Lista and Terra also elaborated their dream setlist.

One month later, the band released the single "S.H.E.A", an acronym for "Siempre He Estado Aquí" (“I’ve always been here”), which was originally released and performed during their 2020 livestream event, but updated to feature the added vocals of Dulce María (who was absent during the reunion).

== Awards and nominations ==
Year	Ceremony	Award	Result	Ref.
2023	Billboard Music Awards	Top Latin Touring Artist	Nominated	
2024	Pollstar Awards	Latin Tour of the Year	Nominated	
2024	Lo Nuestro Awards	Tour of the Year	Nominated	
2024	Latin American Music Awards	Tour of the Year	Won	
2024	MTV MIAW Awards	Event of the Year	Nominated	
2024	Billboard Latin Music Awards	Tour of the Year	Nominated	

== Set list ==
This set list is representative of the concert on August 25, 2023. It does not represent all concerts for the duration of the tour.

1. "Tras de Mí"
2. "Un Poco De Tu Amor"
3. "Cerquita de Ti"
4. "Aún Hay Algo"
5. "Otro Día Que Va"
6. Medley Chicas: "Así Soy Yo" / "Cuando El Amor Se Acaba" / "Fuego"
7. "Inalcanzable"
8. Medley Eras: "Tenerte y Quererte" / "Me Voy" / "Dame" / "Y No Puedo Olvidarte" / "Para Olvidarte De Mí"
9. "Enséñame"
10. "Qué Hay Detrás"
11. Mashup: "Quisiera Ser" / "I Wanna Be the Rain"
12. "Celestial"
13. "Bésame Sin Miedo"
14. "Ser O Parecer"
15. Medley Chicos: "Futuro Ex-Novio" / "Qué Fue del Amor"
16. "No Pares"
17. "Este Corazón"
18. "Siempre He Estado Aquí"
19. "Empezar Desde Cero"
20. Medley Baladas: "Una Canción" / "A Tu Lado" / "Quizá" / "Adiós"
21. "Sólo Quédate En Silencio"
22. "Sálvame"
23. "Nuestro Amor"
24. "Rebelde"

=== Notes ===
- During the show in El Paso, the group performed "Cerquita de Ti", "Para Olvidarte de Mí" and "Adiós" for the first time ever.
- The band's performance contains elements from "Era La Música", "Wanna Play" and "Cariño Mío", and precedes either Maite's solo "Empezar Desde Cero" or Christian's solo ("Quisiera Ser/I Wanna Be The Rain" or "Tu Amor").
- The song "Tu Amor" (in the company of mariachis) replaced "Quisiera Ser/I Wanna Be the Rain" at shows in New York (September 1), Chicago, Las Vegas, Miami (September 22), Arlington, San Francisco, Los Angeles (October 18, 19 and 22), Medellín (November 4 and 5), Rio de Janeiro (November 10), São Paulo (November 13, 17 and 18), Monterrey (November 24 and December 12) and Mexico City (November 30, December 1, 2, 3, 16, 17 and 21).
- The Medley Ballads segment was performed in El Paso, Houston, New York, Fairfax, Greensboro, Atlanta, Edinburg, and after the shows beginning in Medellín.
- During the show on November 10 in Rio de Janeiro, Anahí sang the chorus of "Hasta Que Llegués Tu" from her album Mi Delirio in a cappella, after "Sálvame".
- During the shows on November 16 and 17 in São Paulo, "Sálvame" preceded the song "Otro Día Que Va".
- During the show on November 17, Anahí was not present during the Ballads Medley and the songs "Solo Quédate en Silencio", "Nuestro Amor" and "Rebelde" due to an infection in her kidneys, and had to leave before the show's end.
- Anahí was not present during the show on November 18, due to being hospitalized for the aforementioned kidney infection, and "Sálvame" and "Enséñame" were not performed. Christian performed her verses on "Otro Día Que Va" and her solo song "Así Soy Yo" during the Medley Chicas, while Dulce María, Maite, and the public sang her verses and ad-libs on the rest of the songs.

== Tour dates ==
List of concerts, showing date, city, country, venue, opening acts, attendance (tickets sold / total available), and gross revenue
Date (2023)	City	Country	Venue	Attendance	Revenue
August 25	El Paso	United States	Sun Bowl Stadium	34,185 / 34,185	$6,683,189
August 27	Houston	United States	Minute Maid Park	41,100 / 41,100	$9,991,784
August 31	New York City	United States	Madison Square Garden	27,884 / 27,884	$8,588,037
September 1	New York City	United States	Madison Square Garden	27,884 / 27,884	$8,588,037
September 2	Fairfax	United States	EagleBank Arena	7,984 / 7,984	$2,652,229
September 3	Greensboro	United States	Greensboro Coliseum Complex	14,241 / 14,241	$3,634,079
September 7	Chicago	United States	Guaranteed Rate Field	63,763 / 63,763	$13,177,722
September 8	Chicago	United States	Guaranteed Rate Field	63,763 / 63,763	$13,177,722
September 10	Denver	United States	Ball Arena	13,136 / 13,136	$3,914,603
September 12	Glendale (Note: Labelled as Phoenix in promotional material.)	United States	Desert Diamond Arena	26,614 / 26,614	$6,501,532
September 13	Glendale	United States	Desert Diamond Arena	26,614 / 26,614	$6,501,532
September 14	Paradise (Note: Labelled as Las Vegas in promotional material.)	United States	MGM Grand Garden Arena	12,303 / 12,303	$3,424,124
September 21	Miami	United States	Kaseya Center	26,089 / 26,089	$7,528,910
September 22	Miami	United States	Kaseya Center	26,089 / 26,089	$7,528,910
September 23	Orlando	United States	Amway Center	12,907 / 12,907	$3,515,406
September 24	Atlanta	United States	Lakewood Amphitheater	18,758 / 18,758	$2,834,430
September 27	Edinburg	United States	Bert Ogden Arena	16,471 / 16,471	$3,771,059
September 28	Edinburg	United States	Bert Ogden Arena	16,471 / 16,471	$3,771,059
September 30	Arlington	United States	Globe Life Field	38,075 / 38,075	$10,458,075
October 1	Austin	United States	Moody Center	11,585 / 11,585	$3,522,708
October 6	San José	United States	SAP Center	12,780 / 12,780	$3,389,854
October 7	Sacramento	United States	Golden 1 Center	13,156 / 13,156	$3,771,738
October 8	San Francisco	United States	Chase Center	12,853 / 12,853	$3,923,187
October 13	San Diego	United States	Viejas Arena	17,903 / 17,903	$4,793,208
October 14	San Diego	United States	Viejas Arena	17,903 / 17,903	$4,793,208
October 15	Fresno	United States	Save Mart Center	11,663 / 11,663	$2,955,548
October 18	Los Angeles	United States	BMO Stadium	89,284 / 89,284	$21,470,082
October 19	Los Angeles	United States	BMO Stadium	89,284 / 89,284	$21,470,082
October 20	Los Angeles	United States	BMO Stadium	89,284 / 89,284	$21,470,082
October 22	Los Angeles	United States	BMO Stadium	89,284 / 89,284	$21,470,082
November 3	Medellín	Colombia	Estadio Atanasio Girardot	149,719 / 149,719	$17,237,833
November 4	Medellín	Colombia	Estadio Atanasio Girardot	149,719 / 149,719	$17,237,833
November 5	Medellín	Colombia	Estadio Atanasio Girardot	149,719 / 149,719	$17,237,833
November 6	Medellín	Colombia	Estadio Atanasio Girardot	149,719 / 149,719	$17,237,833
November 9	Rio de Janeiro	Brazil	Estádio Olímpico Nilton Santos	128,565 / 128,565	$10,836,518
November 10 (Note: The concert in Rio de Janeiro on November 10, 2023, was originally scheduled on November 19, 2023, but it was rescheduled for logistic reasons.)	Rio de Janeiro	Brazil	Estádio Olímpico Nilton Santos	128,565 / 128,565	$10,836,518
November 12	São Paulo	Brazil	Estádio do Morumbi	135,157 / 135,157	$11,033,885
November 13	São Paulo	Brazil	Estádio do Morumbi	135,157 / 135,157	$11,033,885
November 16	São Paulo	Brazil	Allianz Parque	190,743 / 190,743	$17,392,027
November 17	São Paulo	Brazil	Allianz Parque	190,743 / 190,743	$17,392,027
November 18	São Paulo	Brazil	Allianz Parque	190,743 / 190,743	$17,392,027
November 19	São Paulo	Brazil	Allianz Parque	190,743 / 190,743	$17,392,027
November 23	Monterrey	Mexico	Estadio Mobil Super	58,034 / 58,034 (Note: Combined totals for all Monterrey shows.)	$7,384,549
November 24	Monterrey	Mexico	Estadio Mobil Super	58,034 / 58,034	$7,384,549
November 26	Zapopan (Note: Labelled as Guadalajara in promotional material.)	Mexico	Estadio Tres de Marzo	33,620 / 33,620	$4,602,151
November 27	Zapopan	Mexico	Estadio Tres de Marzo	33,620 / 33,620	$4,602,151
November 30	Mexico City	Mexico	Foro Sol	347,923 / 347,923 (Note: Combined totals for all Foro Sol shows.)	$28,474,828
December 1	Mexico City	Mexico	Foro Sol	347,923 / 347,923	$28,474,828
December 2	Mexico City	Mexico	Foro Sol	347,923 / 347,923	$28,474,828
December 3	Mexico City	Mexico	Foro Sol	347,923 / 347,923	$28,474,828
December 12	Monterrey	Mexico	Estadio Mobil Super		
December 16	Mexico City	Mexico	Foro Sol		
December 17	Mexico City	Mexico	Foro Sol		
December 21	Mexico City	Mexico	Estadio Azteca	45,489 / 45,489	$4,270,697
Total				1,611,982 / 1,611,982 (100%)	$231,733,992 (MXN4.101.619.899)

== Personnel ==
Credits adapted from Billboard.

Creative direction

- Anahí – main artist, executive producer
- Christian Chávez – main artist, executive producer
- Christopher von Uckermann – main artist, executive producer
- Dulce María – main artist, executive producer
- Maite Perroni – main artist, executive producer

Creative direction and executive producers

- Guillermo Rosas – manager, executive producer
- Marilyn Saidman – tour director
- Marciano Agabon – tour manager
- Melody Marie – tour manager
- Julianna Vargas – Costume Designer
- Angie Escamila - Costume Designer, Dresser
- Landon Rivera - Dancer Costume Designer
- Duane Saunders - Wardrobe Supervisor
- Carrie Diamond - Dancer Dresser
- Breani Williams - Dancer Dresser
- 8&1 Creative – stage management
- Blank Wall Creative – production and show design

Band

- Giorgio Torelli – director and music producer
- Alex Gómez Rodríguez – drummer
- Charly Rey – guitar, acoustic guitar
- Ivan Barrera – violinist, bassist, double bassist
- Luis Emilio "Catire" Mauri Arreaza – percussion
- Marco Rojas – guitarist
- Sandy Domínguez – backing vocals
- Mariano – backing vocals

Choreography

- Jason Young – creative director, choreographer
- Travis Shirley – creative director, choreographer
- Memo Martinez – choreographer
- Paul Kirkland – choreographer
- Edson Juarez – choreographer

Dancers

- Allie Laliberte
- Joavanie Santiago
- Jonah Almanzar
- Mariah Spears
- Phoebe Raye
- Simrin Player
- Terrance Barksdale Jr.
- Tommy Green

Personal services

- Gustavo Matta – costume designer
- Edwin Rodriguez – photographer

Tour promotion

- Live Nation

Merchandising

- AT&T

Security

- Alejandro Martinez – Anahí's personal security

A creation of

- T6H Entertainment
- Souls Productions
- Creative Artists Agency (CAA)

== See also ==
- List of Billboard Boxscore number-one concert series of the 2020s
- List of highest-grossing concert tours by Latin artists
- List of most-attended ticketed multi-night concerts
- List of most-attended concert tours
