= Siempre He Estado Aquí =

2020 single by Mexican pop group RBD

Single by RBD
- Language: Spanish
- English title: "I've Always Been Here"
- Released: November 17, 2020; February 23, 2023 ("S.H.E.A")
- Genre: Latin pop
- Length: 3:10
- Label: Universal Music
- Songwriters: Andrés Torres; Mauricio Rengifo
- Producers: Torres; Rengifo

RBD singles chronology
"Para olvidarte de mí" (2009)	"Siempre He Estado Aquí" (2020)	"S.H.E.A" (2023)

Alternative covers
- 2021 Live version

- 2023 version

Music video
- "Siempre He Estado Aquí (Animated Video)" on YouTube

"Siempre He Estado Aquí" is song by Mexican pop group RBD. Written and produced by Colombian duo Cali y El Dandee, the song was released on 17 November 2020 by Universal Music as the band's comeback single. It was their first song in 11 years since "Para olvidarte de mí" was released in 2009.

The track was used to promote their reunion show celebrating the re-release of the band's music on digital platforms and stores. Like the concert, the song features only four of the six original members: Anahí, Christian Chávez, Christopher von Uckermann and Maite Perroni. Bandmates Alfonso Herrera and Dulce María were not present due to personal reasons. The live version was released on 5 February 2021 as the lead single of its parent album.

On 23 February 2023, with the intention of promoting the group's reunion and sixth tour, a new version of the song was released, under the title "S.H.E.A", with the added vocals of Dulce María.

== Background ==
On 22 December 2019, eleven years after the separation of RBD, Anahí, Alfonso Herrera, Christian Chávez, Christopher Uckermann, Dulce María and Maite Perroni, met and posted photos of a reunion on social media, raising suspicions of a supposed return of the group in the future. Despite the rumors, Herrera clarified that the reunion was just a "meeting of friends", with no commercial intention. On 27 August 2020, Anahí, Chávez, Uckermann, María and Perroni each posted a video and mysterious link on their social networks asking fans to subscribe to a page titled "RB2 World". On 8 September, all of the band's studio albums were made available on digital platforms by Universal Music Latino, as well as the music videos on YouTube, via the group's official page. In December 2020, the group surpassed 250 million total streams on Spotify.

After several other speculations surrounding the group's reunion, a virtual concert called Ser O Parecer: The Global Virtual Union, was announced on 30 September, which would feature only four original members: Anahí, Chávez, Uckermann and Perroni. Due to the controversy caused by the absence of the other two members, Herrera and María, Chávez took to his social media to explain the reason for their absences, and considered the event as a tribute to RBD and not a definitive return. On 23 October, Anahí announced during an interview with the Mexican program Hoy, that the group would release a new song and that it would serve as promotion for the virtual event. On 11 November, Perroni posted a snippet of the song's instrumental through her official TikTok account.

== Composition and production ==
"Siempre He Estado Aquí" is a latin pop song that lasts three minutes and ten seconds, using the verse-chorus-post-chorus form. It is a tribute to the band's legacy and their fans. The song was written and produced by the Colombian duo Mauricio Rengifo and Andrés Torres, known as Cali y El Dandee, who also produced Luis Fonsi's hit single "Despacito" (2017), and contains melodic chords. The song sends the message that even though they were "separated", the band never moved away from their audience. During the second verse, the group references five of their old songs: "Sálvame", "Este Corazón", "Enseñame", "Un Poco De Tu Amor" and "Sólo Quédate en Silencio", all included on their debut album Rebelde (2004), except "Este Corazón", which belongs to their second studio album Nuestro Amor (2005). This is done in the lines: "Sálvame con este corazón / Tan sólo enséñame un poco de tu amor / Y sólo quédate en silencio que aún hay tanto por contar...", sung by Anahí, Chávez, and Perroni, respectively. During their 2023 reunion tour, Perroni changed the line to "Aún hay algo por contar", referencing the second single "Aún Hay Algo" from Nuestro Amor.

The song's music video was directed by Peter Odor at Malabar Studios and released in December 2020. According to Perroni, all production and recording was done remotely, following safety protocols due to the COVID-19 pandemic.

== Release ==
Even though the single's release was confirmed for 17 November 2020 at night, "Siempre He Estado Aquí" was played for the first time on Radio Disney in Mexico in the afternoon. At 6pm (CST), the song was released worldwide on streaming platforms, along with its lyric video. On November 18, the single was released as a digital download.

On 23 February 2023, the group released a second version of the song containing new vocals from María, in order to promote their reunion concert series Soy Rebelde Tour.

== Music video ==
On 24 November 2020, a teaser for the song's official music video was released. On 3 December, the clip was released in full with a futuristic theme, showing the four members, in avatar form, inside a ship destined for the virtual event. On 17 December, an exclusive version of the clip was released on Facebook. The official video was directed by Peter Odor and produced by Guillermo Rosas. Extracts from the clip were shown during the performance of the song at the virtual concert.

=== Critical reception ===
The music video received harsh criticism from fans since the release of the teaser, who questioned the fact that the video was made using animation. Perroni's avatar was also criticized, with fans claiming that it did not resemble the singer. Another controversy was the use of an altered photo of the group from 2008, which showed only the four returning members, leaving out María and Herrera. During a live on YouTube, the video's director, Peter Odor, clarified that he cut the former members from the photo due to image rights, as they were not part of the project.

== Live performances ==
The song was performed by the group during the virtual concert Ser O Parecer: The Global Virtual Union on 26 December 2020. The performance was made available on the group's official channel on 4 February 2021. The track was performed during the band's Soy Rebelde Tour, being the 18th song on the setlist.

== Commercial performance ==
After its release, "Siempre He Estado Aquí" entered the US iTunes Top50 list, as well as topping the store's download rankings in several countries including Mexico, Slovenia and Latin America. In 24 hours, the song received more than 700,000 streams.

== Track listing ==
- Digital download
1. "Siempre He Estado Aquí" – 3:10
- Digital download / Live version
1. "Siempre He Estado Aquí (En Vivo)" – 3:07
- Digital download / 2023 version
1. "S.H.E.A" – 3:10

== Credits and personnel ==
- Anahí – vocals
- Andrés Torres – producer, songwriter
- Christian Chávez – vocals
- Christopher von Uckermann – vocals
- Dulce María – vocals (Note: Only on the 2023 version)
- Maite Perroni – vocals
- Mauricio Rengifo – producer, songwriter

== Awards and nominations ==
Organization	Year	Category	Result	Ref.
Prêmio Jovem Brasileiro	2021	Hit Musical Latino	Nominated	
Premios Lo Nuestro	2022	Song of the Year - Pop	Nominated	
