= Bienvenidos al Noa Noa =

2015 concert tour by Juan Gabriel

- Tour by Juan Gabriel
- Associated album: Los Dúo
- Start date: June 19, 2015
- End date: December 6, 2015
- Legs: 2
- No. of shows: 33
- Box office: $26.5 million

Juan Gabriel concert chronology
- Volver Tour (2014); Bienvenidos al Noa Noa (2015); MeXXIco Es Todos Tour (2016)

The Bienvenidos al Noa Noa Gira was a North American concert tour by Mexican singer and songwriter Juan Gabriel.

== Commercial reception ==
Tickets for the tour were available to the public on June 19, 2015 and June 26, 2015 on select dates with ticket prices ranging from US$55.00–256.00 in the United States, becoming one of the highest-grossing Latin tours.

== Shows ==
List of concerts, showing date, city, country, venue, opening act, tickets sold, number of available tickets and amount of gross revenue
Date	City	Country	Venue	Opening act(s)	Attendance	Revenue
Leg 1 — North America
June 19, 2015	Guadalajara	Mexico	Plaza de Toros	—	—	—
July 18, 2015	Puebla	Mexico	Centro Expositor	—	—	—
Leg 2 — North America
September 11, 2015	Inglewood	United States	The Forum	—	—	—
September 13, 2015	Las Vegas	United States	Mandalay Bay Events Center	—	8,824 / 8,844	$1,198,867
September 17, 2015	Mexico City	Mexico	Auditorio Nacional	—	57,120 / 57,120	$5,654,156
September 18, 2015	Mexico City	Mexico	Auditorio Nacional	—	57,120 / 57,120	$5,654,156
September 19, 2015	Mexico City	Mexico	Auditorio Nacional	—	57,120 / 57,120	$5,654,156
September 25, 2015	Mexico City	Mexico	Auditorio Nacional	—	57,120 / 57,120	$5,654,156
September 26, 2015	Mexico City	Mexico	Auditorio Nacional	—	57,120 / 57,120	$5,654,156
September 27, 2015	Mexico City	Mexico	Auditorio Nacional	—	57,120 / 57,120	$5,654,156
October 8, 2015	Los Angeles	United States	Microsoft Theater	—	13,252 / 13,764	$1,970,649
October 10, 2015	Los Angeles	United States	Microsoft Theater	—	13,252 / 13,764	$1,970,649
October 14, 2015	Duluth	United States	Infinite Energy Arena	—	8,454 / 9,215	$1,185,337
October 16, 2015	Miami	United States	American Airlines Arena	—	9,151 / 9,151	$1,050,311
October 18, 2015	Rosemont	United States	Allstate Arena	—	13,952 / 13,952	$1,669,052
October 31, 2015	Uncasville	United States	Mohegan Sun	—	5,954 / 6,478	$474,792
November 1, 2015	Fairfax	United States	EagleBank Arena	—	5,378 / 7,374	$481,938
November 4, 2015	New York City	United States	Madison Square Garden	—	9,642 / 12,771	$1,119,985
November 7, 2015	Kansas City	United States	Sprint Center	—	9,527 / 10,603	$1,028,115
November 8, 2015	Denver	United States	Pepsi Center	—	9,688 / 12,459	$880,743
November 11, 2015	Hidalgo	United States	State Farm Arena	—	6,158 / 6,158	$816,935
November 12, 2015	San Antonio	United States	AT&T Center	—	7,960 / 12,712	$805,612
November 15, 2015	Houston	United States	Toyota Center	—	11,225 / 11,887	$1,246,396
November 20, 2015	Tacoma	United States	Tacoma Dome	—	10,582 / 13,866	$1,261,520
November 22, 2015	Sacramento	United States	Sleep Train Arena	—	11,209 / 11,209	$990,402
November 25, 2015	Bakersfield	United States	Rabobank Arena	—	7,014 / 8,176	$722,671
November 27, 2015	San Jose	United States	SAP Center at San Jose	—	12,490 / 12,490	$1,458,560
November 29, 2015	Tucson	United States	Tucson Convention Center	—	5,924 / 7,698	$643,045
December 3, 2015	Dallas	United States	American Airlines Center	—	7,914 / 10,520	$899,455
December 6, 2015	El Paso	United States	Don Haskins Center	—	9,196 / 9,196	$977,759
March 5, 2016	Mexicali	Mexico	Centro de Ferias y Exposiciones	—	10,200 / 12,000	
Total					240,614 / 265,643 (90.5%)	$26,536,300
