= Luis Miguel Tour 2023–24 =

2023–24 concert tour by Luis Miguel

- Tour by Luis Miguel
- Promotional poster for the 2023 tour
- Location: South America • North America • Europe
- Associated albums: Various
- Start date: August 3, 2023
- End date: December 18, 2024
- Legs: 2
- No. of shows: 38 in South America; 141 in North America; 15 in Europe; 194 total
- Attendance: 2.95 million (Note: From 191 reported dates.)
- Box office: $424.3 million

Luis Miguel concert chronology
- México Por Siempre Tour (2018–19); Luis Miguel Tour 2023–24 (2023–24); Luis Miguel Tour 2027 (2027)

The Luis Miguel Tour 2023–24 was a concert tour by Mexican singer Luis Miguel. The tour began on August 3, 2023, in Buenos Aires, Argentina and concluded on December 18, 2024, in Buenos Aires as well. It was promoted by Cárdenas Marketing Network (CMN) and Fénix Entertainment. The tour officially sets a new record as the highest-grossing Latin tour in Billboard Boxscore history.

== Background ==
His previous tour México Por Siempre Tour, which ran from 2018 to 2019, grossed $101.4 million and sold 965,000 tickets across 116 shows, according to Billboard Boxscore. It was the highest grossing Latin tour in Boxscore history until 2022 when Bad Bunny‘s El Último Tour del Mundo and World's Hottest Tour surpassed it.

Luis Miguel announced his new tour on Valentine's Day with just a picture of the tour poster in their social media, after that he released the first tour dates on his birthday (April 19). In less than 24 hours more than 400,000 tickets were sold, selling out 34 shows in Argentina, Chile and US becoming one of the tours with the most tickets sold in a single day of all time. New dates were later released due to high demand. In Mexico the initial 13 concerts were sold out in just four hours after the sale was opened to the general public. Immediately after, five new dates were added in Mexico City and Monterrey.

== Set list ==
This set list is from the August 3, 2023, concert in Buenos Aires. It does not represent all dates throughout the tour.

1. "Será Que No Me Amas"
2. "Amor, Amor, Amor"
3. "Suave"
4. "Culpable o No"
5. "Dormir Contigo"
6. "Te Necesito"
7. "Es Por Ti"
8. "Hasta Que Me Olvides"
9. "Dame"
10. Romance Medley:
  - "No Me Platiques Más"
  - "Usted"
  - "La Puerta"
  - "La Barca"
  - "Inolvidable"
11. No Sé Tú Medley:
  - "Por Debajo de la Mesa"
  - "No Sé Tú"
12. Segundo Romance Medley:
  - "Como Yo Te Amé"
  - "Solamente Una Vez"
  - "Somos Novios"
  - "Todo y Nada"
  - "Nosotros"
13. Tangos Medley:
  - "Por Una Cabeza"
  - "Volver"
  - "Uno"
  - "El Día Que Me Quieras"
14. "Sonríe / Smile" (feat. Michael Jackson)
15. "Come Fly With Me" (feat. Frank Sinatra)
16. Up Tempo Medley:
  - "Un Hombre Busca Una Mujer"
  - "Cuestión de Piel"
  - "Oro de Ley"
17. J.C. Calderón Medley:
  - "Fría Como el Viento"
  - "Tengo Todo Excepto a Ti"
  - "Entrégate"
18. "La Fiesta del Mariachi"
19. "El Balajú"
20. "Llamarada"
21. "Si Nos Dejan"
22. "La Bikina"
23. "La Media Vuelta"
24. Funk Medley:
  - "Quiero"
  - "Que Nivel de Mujer"
  - "Mujer de Fuego"
25. Palabra de Honor Medley:
  - "No Me Puedes Dejar Así"
  - "Palabra de Honor"
  - "La Incondicional"
26. "Te Propongo Esta Noche"
27. Oldies Medley:
  - "Ahora Te Puedes Marchar"
  - "La Chica del Bikini Azul"
  - "Isabel"
  - "Cuando Calienta El Sol"
28. "Cucurrucucú Paloma"

== Tour dates ==
List of 2023 concerts
Date (2023)	City	Country	Venue	Attendance	Revenue
August 3	Buenos Aires	Argentina	Movistar Arena	104,964 / 104,964	$17,330,452
August 4	Buenos Aires	Argentina	Movistar Arena	104,964 / 104,964	$17,330,452
August 6	Buenos Aires	Argentina	Movistar Arena	104,964 / 104,964	$17,330,452
August 8	Buenos Aires	Argentina	Movistar Arena	104,964 / 104,964	$17,330,452
August 9	Buenos Aires	Argentina	Movistar Arena	104,964 / 104,964	$17,330,452
August 12	Buenos Aires	Argentina	Movistar Arena	104,964 / 104,964	$17,330,452
August 15	Buenos Aires	Argentina	Movistar Arena	104,964 / 104,964	$17,330,452
August 16	Buenos Aires	Argentina	Movistar Arena	104,964 / 104,964	$17,330,452
August 17	Buenos Aires	Argentina	Movistar Arena	104,964 / 104,964	$17,330,452
August 18	Buenos Aires	Argentina	Movistar Arena	104,964 / 104,964	$17,330,452
August 21	Santiago	Chile	Movistar Arena	121,993 / 121,993	$14,132,757
August 22	Santiago	Chile	Movistar Arena	121,993 / 121,993	$14,132,757
August 23	Santiago	Chile	Movistar Arena	121,993 / 121,993	$14,132,757
August 25	Santiago	Chile	Movistar Arena	121,993 / 121,993	$14,132,757
August 26	Santiago	Chile	Movistar Arena	121,993 / 121,993	$14,132,757
August 28	Santiago	Chile	Movistar Arena	121,993 / 121,993	$14,132,757
August 29	Santiago	Chile	Movistar Arena	121,993 / 121,993	$14,132,757
September 4	Santiago	Chile	Movistar Arena	121,993 / 121,993	$14,132,757
September 5	Santiago	Chile	Movistar Arena	121,993 / 121,993	$14,132,757
September 6	Santiago	Chile	Movistar Arena	121,993 / 121,993	$14,132,757
September 15	Las Vegas	United States	Dolby Live	15,613 / 15,613	$5,912,238
September 16	Las Vegas	United States	Dolby Live	15,613 / 15,613	$5,912,238
September 17	Las Vegas	United States	Dolby Live	15,613 / 15,613	$5,912,238
September 20	Anaheim	United States	Honda Center	11,038 / 11,038	$2,381,680
September 21	San Diego	United States	Pechanga Arena	10,283 / 10,283	$2,141,022
September 23	Phoenix	United States	Footprint Center	12,221 / 12,221	$2,618,819
September 24	Inglewood	United States	Kia Forum	12,796 / 12,796	$3,133,605
September 27	Ontario	United States	Toyota Arena	7,932 / 7,932	$1,358,104
September 30	Thousand Palms	United States	Acrisure Arena	9,222 / 9,222	$2,052,899
October 4	Rosemont	United States	Allstate Arena	23,843 / 23,843	$4,303,389
October 5	Rosemont	United States	Allstate Arena	23,843 / 23,843	$4,303,389
October 6	Indianapolis	United States	Gainbridge Fieldhouse	12,163 / 12,163	$1,964,369
October 8	New York City	United States	Madison Square Garden	12,424 / 12,424	$2,472,520
October 11	Miami	United States	Kaseya Center	24,790 / 24,790	$5,568,040
October 13	Miami	United States	Kaseya Center	24,790 / 24,790	$5,568,040
October 18	Boston	United States	TD Garden	12,324 / 12,324	$2,099,191
October 20	Washington, D.C.	United States	Capital One Arena	13,029 / 13,029	$2,107,301
October 21	Newark	United States	Prudential Center	11,598 / 11,598	$1,955,654
October 22	Elmont	United States	UBS Arena	12,517 / 12,517	$2,029,324
October 26	Oklahoma City	United States	Paycom Center	10,459 / 10,459	$1,443,391
October 28	Hidalgo	United States	Payne Arena	4,967 / 4,967	$1,428,352
October 29	Dallas	United States	American Airlines Center	12,876 / 12,876	$2,503,558
November 2	Houston	United States	Toyota Center	11,610 / 11,610	$1,961,068
November 4	San Antonio	United States	Frost Bank Center	13,261 / 13,261	$2,543,942
November 5	Austin	United States	Moody Center	11,083 / 11,083	$2,289,030
November 11 (Note: Private show.)	Monterrey	Mexico	Auditorio Citibanamex	—	—
November 14	Monterrey	Mexico	Estadio Banorte	49,628 / 49,628	$9,837,142
November 15	Monterrey	Mexico	Estadio Banorte	49,628 / 49,628	$9,837,142
November 16	Monterrey	Mexico	Estadio Banorte	49,628 / 49,628	$9,837,142
November 20	Mexico City	Mexico	Mexico City Arena	105,114 / 105,114	$15,351,452
November 21	Mexico City	Mexico	Mexico City Arena	105,114 / 105,114	$15,351,452
November 22	Mexico City	Mexico	Mexico City Arena	105,114 / 105,114	$15,351,452
November 24	Mexico City	Mexico	Mexico City Arena	105,114 / 105,114	$15,351,452
November 25	Mexico City	Mexico	Mexico City Arena	105,114 / 105,114	$15,351,452
November 27	Mexico City	Mexico	Mexico City Arena	105,114 / 105,114	$15,351,452
November 28	Mexico City	Mexico	Mexico City Arena	105,114 / 105,114	$15,351,452
December 1 (Note: The concert was postponed to the next day due the rain.)	Querétaro	Mexico	Estadio Corregidora	25,526 / 25,526	$3,882,356
December 2	Aguascalientes	Mexico	Estadio Victoria	23,154 / 23,154	$3,051,209
December 4 (Note: The concert was originally scheduled to be held at Estadio Alfonso Lastras; was relocated due to Atlético San Luis Liguilla Participation.)	San Luis Potosí	Mexico	Estadio Plan de San Luis	22,108 / 22,108	$2,788,754
December 7 (Note: Private show for Banco Santander clients.)	Mexico City	Mexico	Expo Santa Fe México	—	—
December 8	Puebla	Mexico	Estadio Cuauhtémoc	32,263 / 32,263	$4,016,086
December 10	Oaxaca	Mexico	Estadio Tecnológico de Oaxaca	18,756 / 18,756	$3,319,713
December 12	Veracruz	Mexico	Estadio Universitario Beto Ávila	16,099 / 16,099	$3,226,734
December 15	Morelia	Mexico	Estadio Morelos	25,504 / 25,504	$2,847,279
December 17	Guadalajara	Mexico	Estadio Jalisco	71,034 / 71,034	$8,241,398
December 18	Guadalajara	Mexico	Estadio Jalisco	71,034 / 71,034	$8,241,398
December 20	Mexico City	Mexico	Mexico City Arena	14,188 / 14,188	$3,285,757
December 31	Riviera Maya	Mexico	Mayakoba	—	—

List of 2024 concerts
Date (2024)	City	Country	Venue	Attendance	Revenue
January 18 (Note: The concert was postponed to the next day due to technical problems.)	Santo Domingo	Dominican Republic	Estadio Olímpico Félix Sánchez	24,887 / 24,887	$2,636,203
January 20	San Juan	Puerto Rico	Coliseo de Puerto Rico	38,704 / 41,313	$4,385,750
January 22	San Juan	Puerto Rico	Coliseo de Puerto Rico	38,704 / 41,313	$4,385,750
January 23	San Juan	Puerto Rico	Coliseo de Puerto Rico	38,704 / 41,313	$4,385,750
January 27	Guatemala City	Guatemala	Explanada Cardales de Cayalá	23,665 / 27,882	$4,944,299
January 28	Guatemala City	Guatemala	Explanada Cardales de Cayalá	23,665 / 27,882	$4,944,299
January 30	San Salvador	El Salvador	Estadio Cuscatlán	20,941 / 20,941	$1,918,113
February 2	Tegucigalpa	Honduras	Estadio Nacional Chelato Uclés	22,228 / 22,228	$2,540,158
February 5	Managua	Nicaragua	Estadio Nacional Soberanía	18,501 / 18,501	$2,065,208
February 8	San José	Costa Rica	Estadio Nacional	38,714 / 38,714	$4,117,227
February 12	Caracas	Venezuela	Estadio Monumental Simón Bolívar	35,422 / 36,013	$6,841,619
February 17	Bogotá	Colombia	Coliseo MedPlus	28,174 / 28,174	$3,706,014
February 18	Bogotá	Colombia	Coliseo MedPlus	28,174 / 28,174	$3,706,014
February 21	Quito	Ecuador	Estadio Olímpico Atahualpa	30,932 / 30,932	$3,382,686
February 24	Lima	Peru	Estadio Nacional	82,812 / 82,812	$10,461,259
February 25	Lima	Peru	Estadio Nacional	82,812 / 82,812	$10,461,259
March 1	Santiago	Chile	Estadio Nacional	75,743 / 96,474	$6,538,269
March 2	Santiago	Chile	Estadio Nacional	75,743 / 96,474	$6,538,269
March 5	Buenos Aires	Argentina	La Rural	1,258 / 1,656	$1,577,254
March 6	Buenos Aires	Argentina	Campo Argentino de Polo	113,175 / 124,961	$8,444,817
March 9	Buenos Aires	Argentina	Campo Argentino de Polo	113,175 / 124,961	$8,444,817
March 10 (Note: The concert was originally scheduled on March 8; was postponed due to electric storm)	Buenos Aires	Argentina	Campo Argentino de Polo	113,175 / 124,961	$8,444,817
March 14	Córdoba	Argentina	Monumental de Alta Córdoba	18,558 / 18,558	$1,678,851
March 16	Montevideo	Uruguay	Estadio Centenario	28,401 / 37,111	$3,071,996
March 20	Asunción	Paraguay	Estadio La Nueva Olla	25,062 / 31,220	$2,024,574
March 23	São Paulo	Brazil	Allianz Parque	24,207 / 34,944	$2,693,317
April 4	Seattle	United States	Climate Pledge Arena	12,887 / 12,887	$2,236,751
April 6 (Note: The show was postponed to the next day due to technical difficulties.)	Portland	United States	Moda Center	10,638 / 10,638	$1,928,767
April 10 (Note: The show was originally scheduled on April 7; it was postponed due to technical difficulties.)	Sacramento	United States	Golden 1 Center	9,549 / 11,395	$1,702,125
April 11	San Francisco	United States	Chase Center	10,812 / 10,812	$2,064,535
April 13	Fresno	United States	Save Mart Center	9,955 / 9,955	$1,673,891
April 14	San José	United States	SAP Center	11,853 / 11,853	$2,370,808
April 16	Los Angeles	United States	Crypto.com Arena	22,396 / 22,396	$3,459,229
April 17	Los Angeles	United States	Crypto.com Arena	22,396 / 22,396	$3,459,229
April 19	Las Vegas	United States	T-Mobile Arena	13,545 / 13,545	$2,586,769
April 23 (Note: The show was originally scheduled for April 20.)	Glendale	United States	Desert Diamond Arena	12,027 / 12,027	$2,028,208
April 25	Thousand Palms	United States	Acrisure Arena	8,819 / 8,819	$1,648,052
April 26	Ontario	United States	Toyota Arena	8,523 / 8,523	$1,918,301
April 28	Salt Lake City	United States	Delta Center	10,561 / 10,561	$1,616,437
May 1	El Paso	United States	Don Haskins Center	12,916 / 12,916	$3,921,538
May 2	El Paso	United States	Don Haskins Center	12,916 / 12,916	$3,921,538
May 4	Laredo	United States	Sames Auto Arena	7,912 / 7,912	$1,492,292
May 5	Austin	United States	Moody Center	9,297 / 9,297	$1,603,908
May 8	Dallas	United States	American Airlines Center	12,031 / 12,031	$1,975,360
May 10	Hidalgo	United States	Payne Arena	4,850 / 4,850	$1,549,446
May 11	San Antonio	United States	Frost Bank Center	12,615 / 12,615	$2,144,421
May 15	Houston	United States	Toyota Center	18,702 / 21,648	$3,064,247
May 16	Houston	United States	Toyota Center	18,702 / 21,648	$3,064,247
May 18	Atlanta	United States	State Farm Arena	18,055 / 18,055	$3,217,658
May 19	Atlanta	United States	State Farm Arena	18,055 / 18,055	$3,217,658
May 23	Toronto	Canada	Scotiabank Arena	12,724 / 12,724	$1,618,525
May 24	Montreal	Canada	Bell Centre	12,699 / 12,699	$1,402,183
May 26	Minneapolis	United States	Target Center	7,139 / 8,681	$888,671
May 29	Rosemont	United States	Allstate Arena	18,840 / 23,372	$2,856,198
May 30	Rosemont	United States	Allstate Arena	18,840 / 23,372	$2,856,198
June 1	Brooklyn	United States	Barclays Center	11,738 / 11,738	$1,881,315
June 2	Uncasville	United States	Mohegan Sun Arena	5,432 / 6,198	$741,475
June 4 (Note: The show was originally scheduled for October 15, but was postponed due to logistical conflicts.)	Tampa	United States	Amalie Arena	10,692 / 12,473	$1,742,871
June 5	Orlando	United States	Kia Center	10,734 / 10,734	$1,910,169
June 6	Sunrise	United States	Amerant Bank Arena	7,735 / 10,120	$1,123,948
June 8	Miami	United States	Kaseya Center	21,841 / 23,174	$4,382,069
June 9	Miami	United States	Kaseya Center	21,841 / 23,174	$4,382,069
June 11 (Note: The show was originally scheduled for June 16.)	Greensboro	United States	Greensboro Coliseum	9,839 / 11,509	$1,438,051
June 14	Nashville	United States	Bridgestone Arena	8,907 / 10,427	$1,381,052
June 28	Córdoba	Spain	Plaza de Toros de los Califas	7,856 / 7,856	$1,081,691
June 30	Seville	Spain	Estadio de La Cartuja	20,687 / 20,687	$2,121,675
July 3	Pamplona	Spain	Navarra Arena	6,753 / 6,753	$951,536
July 6	Madrid	Spain	Estadio Santiago Bernabéu	89,185 / 89,185	$13,806,150
July 7	Madrid	Spain	Estadio Santiago Bernabéu	89,185 / 89,185	$13,806,150
July 10	Murcia	Spain	Plaza de Toros de la Condomina	5,184 / 6,087	$876,558
July 13	Roquetas de Mar	Spain	Estadio Antonio Peroles	9,817 / 11,228	$1,038,337
July 17	Barcelona	Spain	Palau Sant Jordi	28,314 / 28,314	$3,415,127
July 18	Barcelona	Spain	Palau Sant Jordi	28,314 / 28,314	$3,415,127
July 21	A Coruña	Spain	Coruña Sounds	10,847 / 10,847	$1,133,004
July 24	Chiclana	Spain	Concert Music Festival	5,552 / 6,631	$962,942
July 27	Valencia	Spain	Estadi Ciutat de València	21,238 / 21,238	$2,511,983
July 31	Marbella	Spain	Starlite Festival	9,681 / 9,681	$2,009,224
August 2	Marbella	Spain	Starlite Festival	9,681 / 9,681	$2,009,224
August 3	Marbella	Spain	Starlite Festival	9,681 / 9,681	$2,009,224
August 22	Monterrey	Mexico	Estadio Banorte	33,785 / 48,093	$5,542,251
August 24	Monterrey	Mexico	Estadio Banorte	33,785 / 48,093	$5,542,251
August 25	Monterrey	Mexico	Estadio Banorte	33,785 / 48,093	$5,542,251
August 28	Chihuahua	Mexico	Estadio UACH	18,871 / 22,753	$2,789,032
August 31 (Note: The show was postponed to the next day due to severe weather conditions.)	Ciudad Juárez	Mexico	Estadio Juárez Vive	10,119 / 16,187	$2,136,571
September 3 (Note: The show was postponed to the next day due to delay in logistics and local production.)	Mexicali	Mexico	Estadio Nido de los Águilas	13,244 / 19,636	$1,906,476
September 4	Tijuana	Mexico	Estadio Caliente	39,966 / 48,538	$4,008,756
September 5	Tijuana	Mexico	Estadio Caliente	39,966 / 48,538	$4,008,756
September 7	Valle de Guadalupe	Mexico	Arena Valle de Guadalupe	8,211 / 8,211	$1,819,662
September 12	Las Vegas	United States	The Colosseum at Caesars Palace	12,218 / 12,924	$4,320,037
September 14	Las Vegas	United States	The Colosseum at Caesars Palace	12,218 / 12,924	$4,320,037
September 15	Las Vegas	United States	The Colosseum at Caesars Palace	12,218 / 12,924	$4,320,037
September 19	Saltillo	Mexico	Estadio Francisco I. Madero	16,599 / 19,726	$2,504,361
September 21	Torreón	Mexico	Estadio Revolución	18,680 / 19,132	$2,254,697
September 24	Hermosillo	Mexico	Estadio Héroe de Nacozari	19,105 / 22,288	$2,183,824
October 1	Guadalajara	Mexico	Estadio Jalisco	29,944 / 36,067	$2,975,619
October 3	Aguascalientes	Mexico	Estadio Victoria	13,983 / 18,526	$1,768,214
October 8	Mexico City	Mexico	Mexico City Arena	126,189 / 126,189	$19,162,710
October 9	Mexico City	Mexico	Mexico City Arena	126,189 / 126,189	$19,162,710
October 11	Mexico City	Mexico	Mexico City Arena	126,189 / 126,189	$19,162,710
October 12	Mexico City	Mexico	Mexico City Arena	126,189 / 126,189	$19,162,710
October 15	Mexico City	Mexico	Mexico City Arena	126,189 / 126,189	$19,162,710
October 16	Mexico City	Mexico	Mexico City Arena	126,189 / 126,189	$19,162,710
October 20	Mexico City	Mexico	Mexico City Arena	126,189 / 126,189	$19,162,710
October 21	Mexico City	Mexico	Mexico City Arena	126,189 / 126,189	$19,162,710
November 2	Puebla	Mexico	Estadio Hermanos Serdán	18,285 / 20,318	$2,856,605
November 5	Tuxtla Gutiérrez	Mexico	Estadio Víctor Manuel Reyna	21,251 / 23,721	$2,036,818
November 8	Mérida	Mexico	Estadio Carlos Iturralde	20,166 / 23,165	$2,925,405
November 10	Cancún	Mexico	Estadio Andrés Quintana Roo	16,674 / 21,866	$1,598,571
November 13	Villahermosa	Mexico	Estadio Centenario	11,406 / 15,514	$2,111,877
November 16 (Note: The shows in Acapulco originally scheduled for December 27 and 28 were postponed due to Hurricane Otis aftermath.)	Acapulco	Mexico	Arena GNP Seguros	12,314 / 13,390	$3,473,002
November 17	Acapulco	Mexico	Arena GNP Seguros	12,314 / 13,390	$3,473,002
November 22 (Note: The show in Tampico originally scheduled for October 5, 2024 were postponed due to heavy rains.)	Tampico	Mexico	Estadio Tamaulipas	17,202 / 18,701	$2,357,632
November 23	San Luis Potosí	Mexico	Arena Potosí	9,179 / 9,179	$1,219,464
November 25	Toluca	Mexico	Estadio Alberto "Chivo" Córdoba	25,412 / 26,510	$2,800,836
November 27	Monterrey	Mexico	Arena Monterrey	20,272 / 20,618	$2,522,650
November 28	Monterrey	Mexico	Arena Monterrey	20,272 / 20,618	$2,522,650
November 30	Mexico City	Mexico	Estadio GNP Seguros	115,685 / 115,685	$11,675,175
December 1	Mexico City	Mexico	Estadio GNP Seguros	115,685 / 115,685	$11,675,175
December 3 (Note: The show in Pachuca originally scheduled for October 27, 2024 were postponed due to health issues.)	Pachuca	Mexico	Estadio Hidalgo	21,136 / 22,684	$2,196,716
December 4 (Note: The show in Veracruz originally scheduled for November 20, 2024 were postponed due to adverse weather conditions.)	Veracruz	Mexico	Estadio Universitario Beto Ávila	13,522 / 16,553	$1,361,976
December 6 (Note: The concert was originally scheduled in León on December 5, 2023, but postponed due to logistical problems. After that the show scheduled for October 31, 2024 were postponed again due to health issues.)	Irapuato	Mexico	Estadio Sergio León Chávez	18,682 / 19,974	$2,361,837
December 7 (Note: The show in Querétaro originally scheduled for October 29, 2024 were postponed due to health issues.)	Querétaro	Mexico	Estadio Corregidora	24,742 / 25,714	$3,030,060
December 8 (Note: The show originally scheduled for October 23, 2024 were postponed due to health issues.)	Mexico City	Mexico	Mexico City Arena	31,772 / 31,772	$5,102,493
December 10 (Note: The show originally scheduled for October 24, 2024 were postponed due to health issues.)	Mexico City	Mexico	Mexico City Arena	31,772 / 31,772	$5,102,493
December 17	Buenos Aires	Argentina	Campo Argentino de Polo	55,931 / 70,984	$7,253,450
December 18	Buenos Aires	Argentina	Campo Argentino de Polo	55,931 / 70,984	$7,253,450
Total				2,951,664 / 3,143,410 (93.90%)	$424,347,470

== Cancelled shows ==
List of cancelled concerts
Date (2024)	City	Country	Venue	Reason
February 15	Cali	Colombia	Estadio Olímpico Pascual Guerrero	Logistical problems
March 28	Santa Cruz	Bolivia	Estadio Tahuichi Aguilera	Logistical problems
June 12	New Orleans	United States	Smoothie King Center	Unknown
September 27	Culiacán	Mexico	Estadio Dorados	Security issues
September 29	Mazatlán	Mexico	Estadio El Encanto	Security issues

== Accolades ==
Awards and nominations for the Luis Miguel Tour 2023–24
Year	Ceremony	Category	Result	Ref.
2024	Lo Nuestro Awards	Tour of the Year	Nominated	
2024	Latin American Music Awards	Tour of the Year	Nominated	
2024	Billboard Latin Music Awards	Tour of the Year	Nominated	
2024	Billboard Music Awards	Top Latin Touring Artist	Won	
2025	Lo Nuestro Awards	Tour of the Year	Nominated	
2025	Pollstar Awards	Latin Tour of the Year	Nominated	
2025	Billboard Latin Music Awards	Latin Tour of the Year	Nominated	

== Personnel ==
- Luis Miguel – vocals
- Kiko Cibrian – musical director, guitar
- Lalo Carrillo – bass
- Víctor Loyo – drums
- Mike Rodríguez – piano, keyboards
- Salo Loyo – keyboards
- Roberto Serrano – percussion
- Alejandro Carballo – trombone, orchestra director
- Arturo Solar – trumpet
- Omar Martínez – trumpet
- Bill Churchville – trumpet
- Alejandro Barragán – saxophone
- Paula Peralta – backing vocals
- Lara Mrgic – backing vocals
- Tatyana Cooper – backing vocals
- Vargas de Tecalitlán – mariachi band

== See also ==
- List of highest-grossing concert tours by Latin artists
