= Live in Hollywood (RBD album) =

Live album by RBD
- Released: April 4, 2006
- Recorded: January 21, 2006
- Venues: Pantages Theatre, Los Angeles, California
- Genre: Latin pop
- Length: 62:44 (Mexican version); 57:46 (US edition); 53:58 (Brazilian edition)
- Language: Spanish
- Label: EMI
- Producers: Camilo Lara, Luis Luisillo Miguel, Pedro Damián (executive)

RBD chronology
Rebelde (Edição Brasil) (2005)	Live in Hollywood (2006)	Nosso Amor Rebelde (2006)

Singles from Live in Hollywood
- 1. "No Pares" Released: April 19, 2006

Professional ratings
Review scores
Source	Rating
Allmusic	1.5/5 stars

Live in Hollywood is the second live album by Mexican pop band RBD, released on April 4, 2006, in the United States and Mexico. Live in Hollywood was recorded on RBD's first concert in Los Angeles, California on January 21, 2006, at the Pantages Theatre, as part of the group's 'Tour Generación 2006' world tour. The live album was accompanied by the same-day release of a live concert DVD, also titled Live in Hollywood. The acoustic music that appears on the album was recorded live, though in a way posing a different style to the group's previous Tour Generación RBD en Vivo.

On April 19, 2006, the first single off the album was released, a new song titled "No Pares", which was sung solely by Dulce María. The song proved to be a total success on Mexican radio. The song was written by former Mexican pop star Lynda Thomas and producer Carlos Lara.

== Background and release ==
The day in which the album was recorded, we arrived the day before and I was told "you're going to sing this song... they're going to play it with a guitar and you're going to sing it" ...basically it has a message that people should not stop dreaming... and you always have to fight, that's the message of the song.

—Dulce María talking about "No Pares", the live album's first single.

The live album was recorded on January 21, 2006, at the show performed in the Pantages Theatre in Los Angeles, California, which was part of RBD's second concert tour, titled 'Tour Generación 2006' or 'Nuestro Amor Tour'. The concert was the first the band performed in the United States. The show itself had a visually colorful and acoustic style, even counting with the support of a gospel choir.

One of the members of RBD, Christian Chávez, explained during an interview that the songs recorded belonged to the Nuestro Amor album, the difference being that this time the songs were acoustic, and added: "There are many instruments, strings, percussions, and the finished product is something very cool, more intimate".

The album was simultaneously put on sale on April 4, 2006, in Mexico, Brazil, and the United States. The live concert DVD recorded on January 21, 2006, was also released the same day. In Spain, the live album was released on December 11, 2006. The release is mostly composed of the songs included in RBD's second studio album, Nuestro Amor.

== Singles ==
On April 19, 2006, the first single off the album was released, titled "No Pares". The song is performed solely by Dulce María. The song was written by Lynda Thomas and producer Carlos Lara. The single's music video was taken from footage in the live DVD, and was released to promote it. In 2007, the song won the award for 'Latin Song of the Year' at the 2007 Orgullosamente Latino Awards.

== Commercial performance ==
In North America, the album became a commercial success. In Mexico, the release reached #14 on the Mexican Albums Chart. It was certified Gold by the Asociación Mexicana de Productores de Fonogramas y Videogramas (AMPROFON) for the sales of 50,000 copies in the country. In the United States, the album peaked at #120 on the Billboard 200, where it charted for five weeks. The album reached #4 and position #6 on the Billboard Latin Pop Albums and Billboard Top Latin Albums charts, respectively. With that, the RIAA certified the album 2× Platinum (Latin) for the sales of 120,000 copies.

In Europe, the album also received a favorable reception. In Spain, the album debuted at number #41 on the Spain Albums Chart, peaking at #34 the following week.

In South America, the album also received a good reception since its release. In Brazil, the album reached the #2 spot on the Brazilian Albums Chart, and remained on the ranking for twelve weeks. In Chile, the live release reached #4 on the IFPI chart.

== Track listings ==
Live In Hollywood – Mexican edition
No.	Title	Writer(s)	Length
1.	"Tras de Mi"	Carlos Lara, Karen Sokoloff, Pedro Damián	5:18
2.	"Me Voy"	Kara DioGuardi, Mauri Stern	3:21
3.	"Nuestro Amor"	Memo Méndez Guiú, Emil 'Billy' Méndez	3:23
4.	"Así Soy Yo"	Fernando Rojo	3:38
5.	"Qué Fue Del Amor"	Armando Ávila	3:33
6.	"A Tu Lado"	Lara, Sokoloff	3:38
7.	"No Pares"	Lynda Thomas, Lara	4:16
8.	"Fuera"	Mauricio L. Arriaga	4:13
9.	"Solo Para Ti"	Mario Sandoval	3:58
10.	"Este Corazón"	Ávila	3:50
11.	"Aún Hay Algo"	Lara, Sokoloff	4:01
12.	"Qué Hay Detrás"	Lara, Sokoloff	3:45
13.	"Medley" ("Rebelde"/"Solo Quédate En Silencio"/"Sálvame")	Lara, Max di Carlo, Arriaga, DJ Kafka, Damián	8:31
14.	"Feliz Cumpleaños"	Jade Ell, Mats Hedström, Lara	3:27
15.	"No Pares" (Studio version)	Thomas, Lara	3:47
Total length:			62:44

Live in Hollywood– US edition
No.	Title	Writer(s)	Length
1.	"Tras De Mí"	Lara, Sokoloff, Damián	5:18
2.	"Me Voy"	DioGuardi, Stern	3:21
3.	"Nuestro Amor"	Méndez Guiú, Méndez	3:23
4.	"Así Soy Yo"	Rojo	3:38
5.	"Qué Fue Del Amor"	Ávila	3:33
6.	"A Tu Lado"	Lara, Sokoloff	3:38
7.	"No Pares"	Thomas, Lara	4:16
8.	"Fuera"	Arriaga	4:13
9.	"Solo Para Ti"	Sandoval	3:58
10.	"Este Corazón"	Ávila	3:50
11.	"Aún Hay Algo"	Lara, Sokoloff	4:01
12.	"Qué Hay Detrás"	Lara, Sokoloff	3:45
13.	"Feliz Cumpleaños"	Ell, Hedström, Lara	3:27
14.	"Solo Quédate En Silencio" (Hollywood version)	Arriaga	3:32
15.	"No Pares" (Studio version)	Thomas, Lara	3:47
Total length:			57:46

Live in Hollywood– Brazilian edition
No.	Title	Writer(s)	Length
1.	"Tras De Mí"	Lara, Sokoloff, Damián	5:18
2.	"Me Voy"	DioGuardi, Stern	3:21
3.	"Nuestro Amor"	Méndez Guiú, Méndez	3:23
4.	"Así Soy Yo"	Rojo	3:38
5.	"Qué Fue Del Amor"	Ávila	3:33
6.	"A Tu Lado"	Lara, Sokoloff	3:38
7.	"No Pares"	Thomas, Lara	4:16
8.	"Fuera"	Arriaga	4:13
9.	"Solo Para Ti"	Sandoval	3:58
10.	"Este Corazón"	Ávila	3:50
11.	"Aún Hay Algo"	Lara, Sokoloff	4:01
12.	"Qué Hay Detrás"	Lara, Sokoloff	3:45
13.	"Feliz Cumpleaños"	Ell, Hedström, Lara	3:27
14.	"Solo Quédate En Silencio" (Hollywood version)	Arriaga	3:32
Total length:			53:58

Notes

- "Me Voy" and "Feliz Cumpleaños" are Spanish cover versions of Kelly Clarkson's "Gone", and Mikeyla's "Happy Worst Day", respectively.
- Although the DVD featured the original live audio, the CD had re-recorded songs, mostly by Anahí, due to her vocal problem at the time the concert was recorded.

== Personnel ==
Credits adapted from the album's liner notes.

Vocals

- RBD – all vocals

Musicians

- Güido Laris – bajo sexto
- Carlos Lara – didgeridoo

Production

- Camilo Lara – A&R, executive producer
- Melissa Mochulske – A&R coordination
- Güido Laris – arrangements, musical director
- Iván Machorro – arrangements
- Luis Luisillo Miguel – associate producer, photographer
- Leyla Hoyle – choir
- Maxine Willard Waters – choir
- Daniel Borner – coordination
- Fernando Roldán – engineer
- Pedro Damián – executive producer
- Gustavo Borner – mixing, recording
- Rafael Padilla – percussion
- Carlos Lara – producer
- Marisol Alcelay – product manager
- Carolina Palomo Ramos – production coordinator, PR
- Raúl González Biestro – Stereo mix producer
- Peter Kent – string conductor

== Accolades ==
Year	Ceremony	Award	Result
2007	Billboard Latin Music Awards	Latin Pop Album of the Year – Duo or Group	Nominated
2007	Orgullosamente Latino Awards	Latin Song of the Year ("No Pares")	Won

== Charts ==
Despite its success, the album's debut was not as strong as RBD's first live album, Tour Generación RBD en Vivo. Instead, the album debuted at #74 on the Mexican Top 100 albums chart and peaked at #14 one week later; at MixUp stores, the album debuted at #5 and peaked at #3 on National Sales. In the US, the album debuted at #7 on the Billboard Top Latin Albums chart, where it peaked at #6 in April 2006. The album was certified 2× Platinum (Latin) in the US on June 9, 2006, for the sales of 120,000 copies. This album was released with the Copy Control protection system in some regions.

=== Weekly charts ===
Chart	Peak position
Brazilian Albums Chart	2
Chilean Albums Chart	4
European Top Albums Chart	91
Mexican Albums Chart	14
Slovenian Albums Chart	4
Spanish Albums Chart	34
US Billboard 200	120
US Top Latin Albums (Billboard)	6
US Latin Pop Albums (Billboard)	4

=== Year-end charts ===
Chart (2006)	Position
Brazilian Albums Chart	15
US Billboard Top Latin Albums	28
US Billboard Latin Pop Albums	12

== Certifications and sales ==
Region	Certification	Certified units/sales
Chile (IFPI)	Gold	
Colombia (ASINCOL)	Gold	
Ecuador	—	1,430
Mexico (AMPROFON)	Gold	50,000^{^}
Mexico (AMPROFON) DVD	Platinum+Gold	30,000^{^}
United States (RIAA)	2× Platinum (Latin)	200,000^{^}
^{^} Shipments figures based on certification alone.

== Release history ==
Region	Date	Format	Label
Mexico	April 4, 2006	CD, digital download	EMI
United States	April 4, 2006	CD, digital download	EMI
Brazil	April 4, 2006	CD, CD+DVD, digital download	EMI
Spain	December 11, 2006	CD, digital download	EMI
Mexico	December 2020	Double CD-DVD	Universal Music

== See also ==
- Live In Hollywood (DVD)
