= Hollywood Pantages Theatre =

Theater in Los Angeles, California

- The Pantages
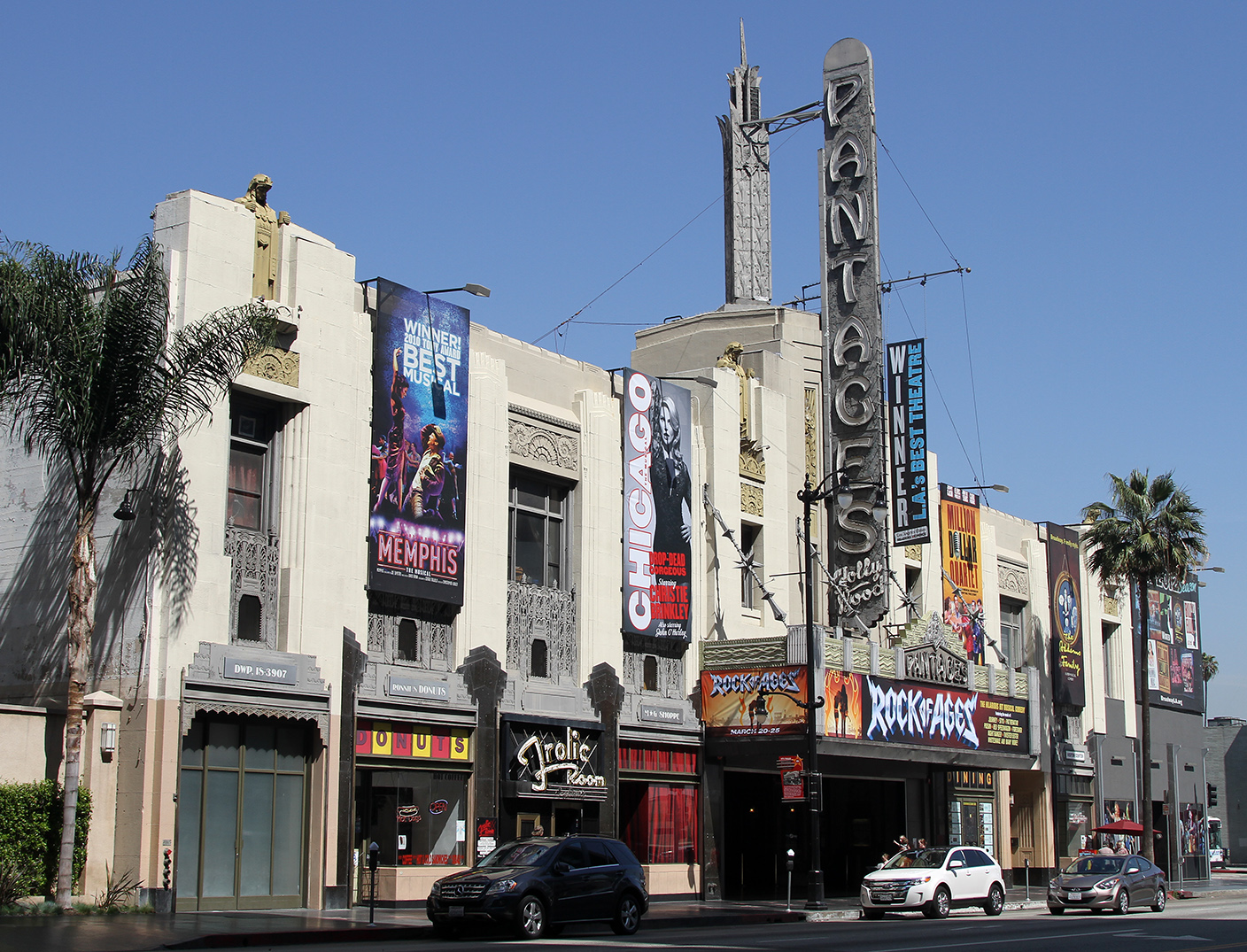
- The theater in 2012
- Interactive map of Hollywood Pantages Theatre
- Former names: RKO Pantages Theatre
- Address: 6233 Hollywood Boulevard; Hollywood, California; United States
- Coordinates: 34.102°N 118.326°W
- Operator: Nederlander Organization
- Seating type: Reserved
- Capacity: 2,691
- Type: Indoor theatre
- Public transit: Hollywood/Vine

Construction
- Groundbreaking: 1929
- Opened: June 4, 1930
- Renovated: 2000

Website
- hollywoodpantages.com

Los Angeles Historic-Cultural Monument
- Designated: July 5, 1978
- Reference no.: 193
- Architect: B. Marcus Priteca
- Architectural style: Art Deco

U.S. National Register of Historic Places
- Designated: April 4, 1985
- Part of: Hollywood Boulevard Commercial and Entertainment National Historic District
- Reference no.: 85000704

Hollywood Pantages Theatre, formerly known as RKO Pantages Theatre and Fox-Pantages Theatre, also known as The Pantages, is a live theater and former movie theater located at 6233 Hollywood Boulevard, near Hollywood and Vine, in the Hollywood neighborhood of Los Angeles, California. Designed by architect B. Marcus Priteca, the theater was the last built by the vaudeville impresario Alexander Pantages and also the last movie palace built in Hollywood.

== History ==
Hollywood Pantages Theatre, the last theater built in the Pantages Theatre Circuit and also the last movie palace built in Hollywood, was built by Alexander Pantages in 1929 and opened on June 4, 1930. The theater was designed to seat 3,212, but it opened with extra legroom and wider seats, reducing seating capacity to 2,812.

The Pantages opened with MGM's The Floradora Girl starring Marion Davies on screen and Franchon & Marco's The Rose Garden Idea on the stage. However, while the theater originally programmed first-run movies and vaudeville acts, it was forced to economize due to effects of the Great Depression. Therefore, starting in 1932, the theater operated primarily as a movie theater, though live entertainment was presented occasionally.

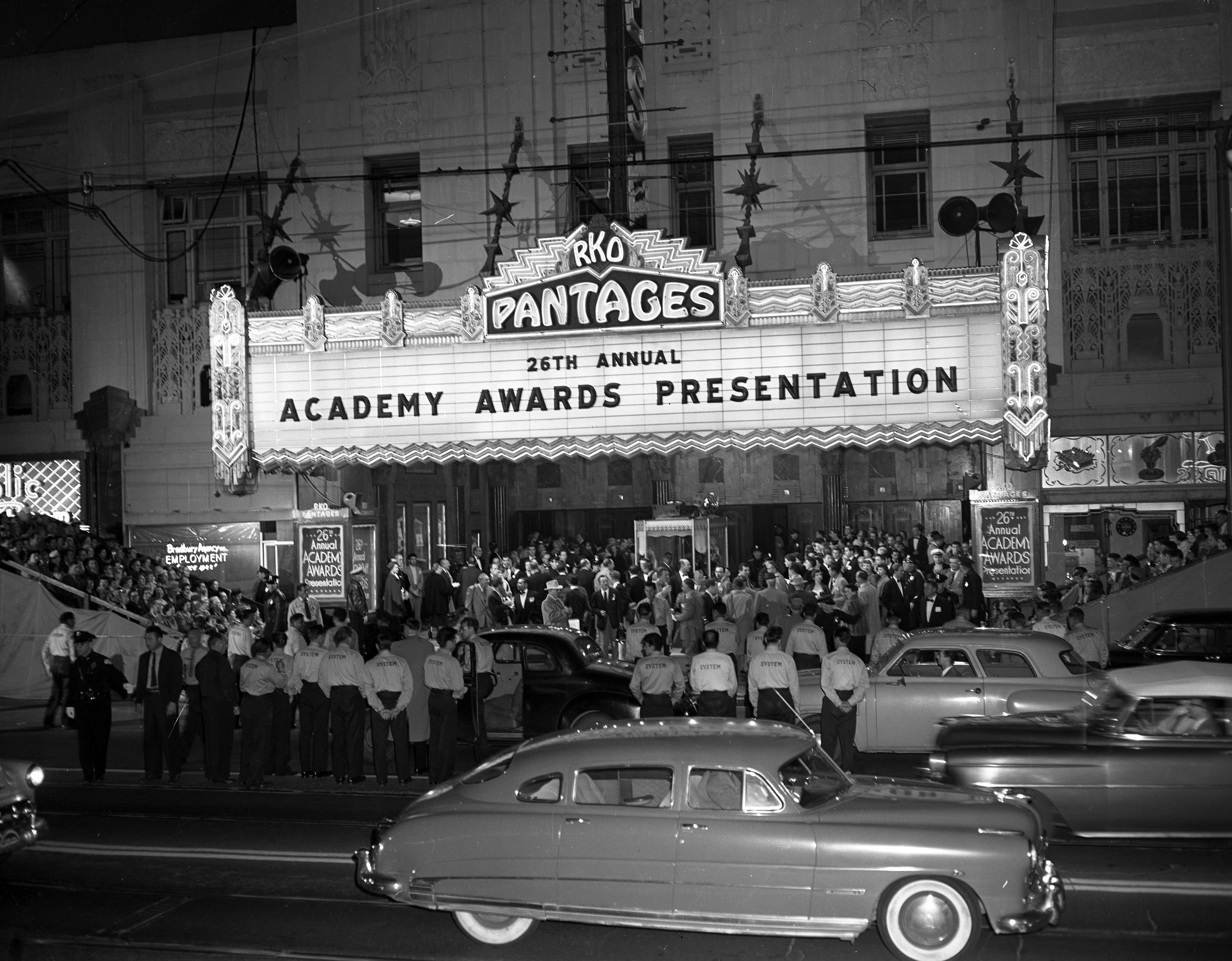
The 26th Academy Awards (1954)

Alexander sold the Pantages to Fox West Coast Theaters in 1932, and in 1949, Howard Hughes acquired the theater for his RKO Theatre Circuit; he also moved his personal offices to the building's second floor. From 1949 to 1959, the theater hosted the Academy Awards, in 1965 it was purchased by Pacific Theatres, and it continued to be a major venue for roadshow movies into the 1970s, with notable screenings during this period including the west coast premieres of Spartacus and Cleopatra, which ran for 61 and 72 weeks, respectively. In 1974, the Emmy Awards were held at The Pantages.

The Pantages closed as a movie theater in January 1977 and re-opened the following month with Bubbling Brown Sugar, followed by Beatlemania, Man of La Mancha, La Cage Aux Folles, Ann Miller and Mickey Rooney in Sugar Babies and Yul Brynner in King and I. Stage productions have been its regular fare ever since.

In 1978, the Pantages Theatre was designated a Los Angeles Historic-Cultural Monument, and in 1985, the Hollywood Boulevard Commercial and Entertainment District was added to the National Register of Historic Places, with Pantages Theater listed as a contributing property in the district.

In March 1999, the theater hosted the Blockbuster Entertainment Awards.

In 2000, the theater underwent a $10-million ($18.7 million in 2025) restoration and upgrade, for which it received a Conservancy Preservation Award in 2001. In December 2007, plans were revealed to complete the building's original design, which consisted of two stories dedicated to theater and ten additional floors of office space, but it was never realized.

Now operated by a subsidiary of the Nederlander Organization, the Pantages is one of Los Angeles's highest-grossing venues for live stage and Broadway-style productions. The five highest-grossing weeks in LA theater history were all at this theater, and the theater has presented large-scale Broadway musicals such as Wicked, Hamilton, The Book of Mormon, and more. Disney's The Lion King played at the theater for 27 months straight, from October 2000 to January 2003.

The theater still hosts the occasional film, including the world premiere of Rogue One in 2016. The theater has also hosted music concerts. Alice Cooper played the Pantages in 1990 and 2016. In 1997, both Prince and Shakira performed at The Pantages, the latter being her first show in the United States. In 2006, Mexican pop-group RBD recorded their CD/DVD Live in Hollywood at the Pantages. Other musicians who have performed at the Pantages include Dream Theater, Foo Fighters, and Mark Knopfler.

== Architecture and design ==
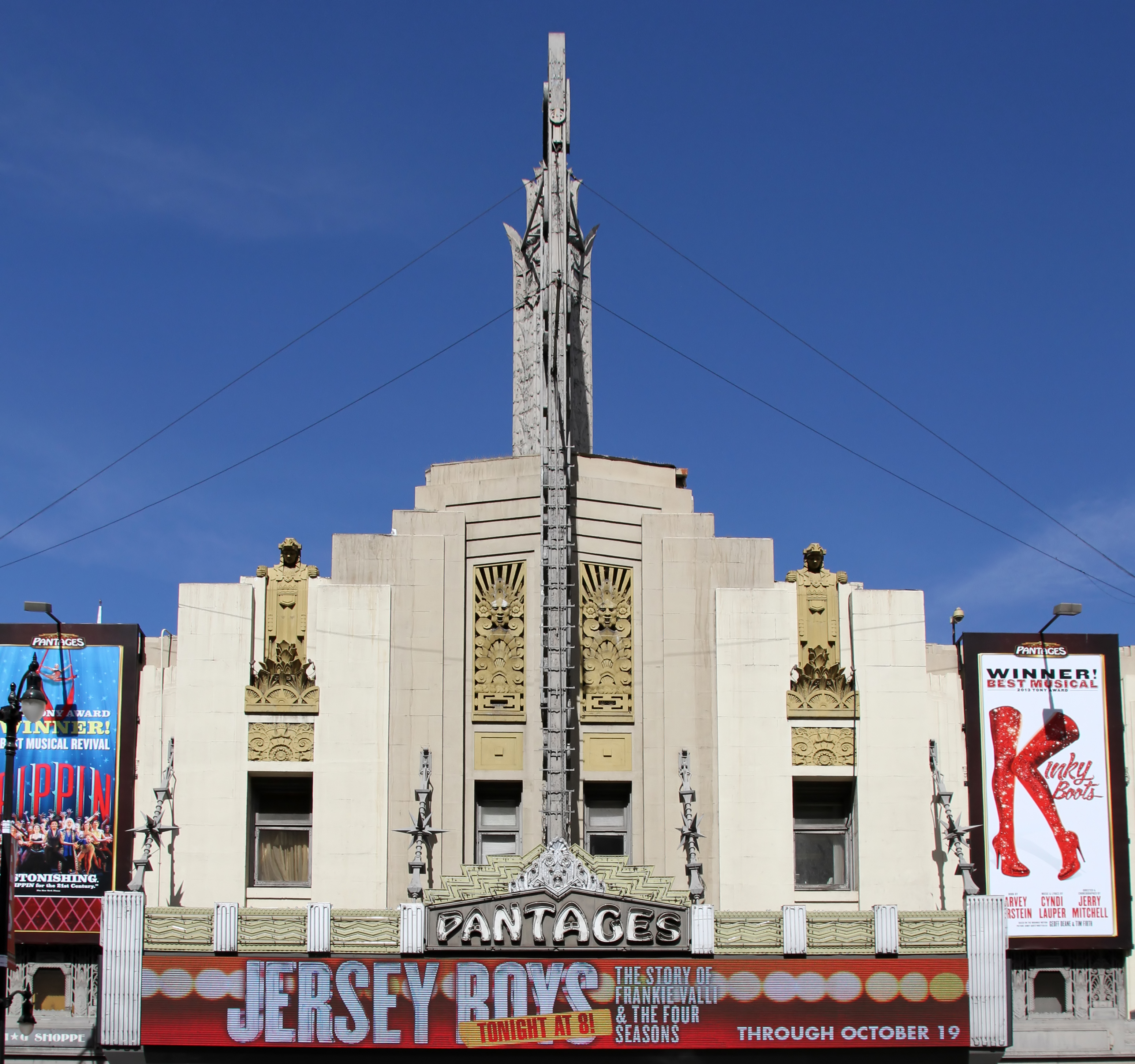
The second story and roofline

Designed by B. Marcus Priteca and opened in 1930, the Pantages was originally meant to be a twelve-story building, with two stories of theater space and ten stories of office space above, but the office space was never built. The cost of construction for the two-story theater was $1.25 million ($24.1 million in 2025).

The theater is a two-story concrete construction designed in the art deco style with an ersatz stone exterior. The building features first story windows outlined with metal zigzag frames, Egyptian lotus patterns that highlight the second story, sculptured goddesses that highlight the roofline, a parapet that rises to a slender spiked finial, and a marquee anchored by barbed supports. The theater's forecourt features a lavish ceiling with gold, silver, and bronze-colored starbursts that radiate in multiple geometric patterns.

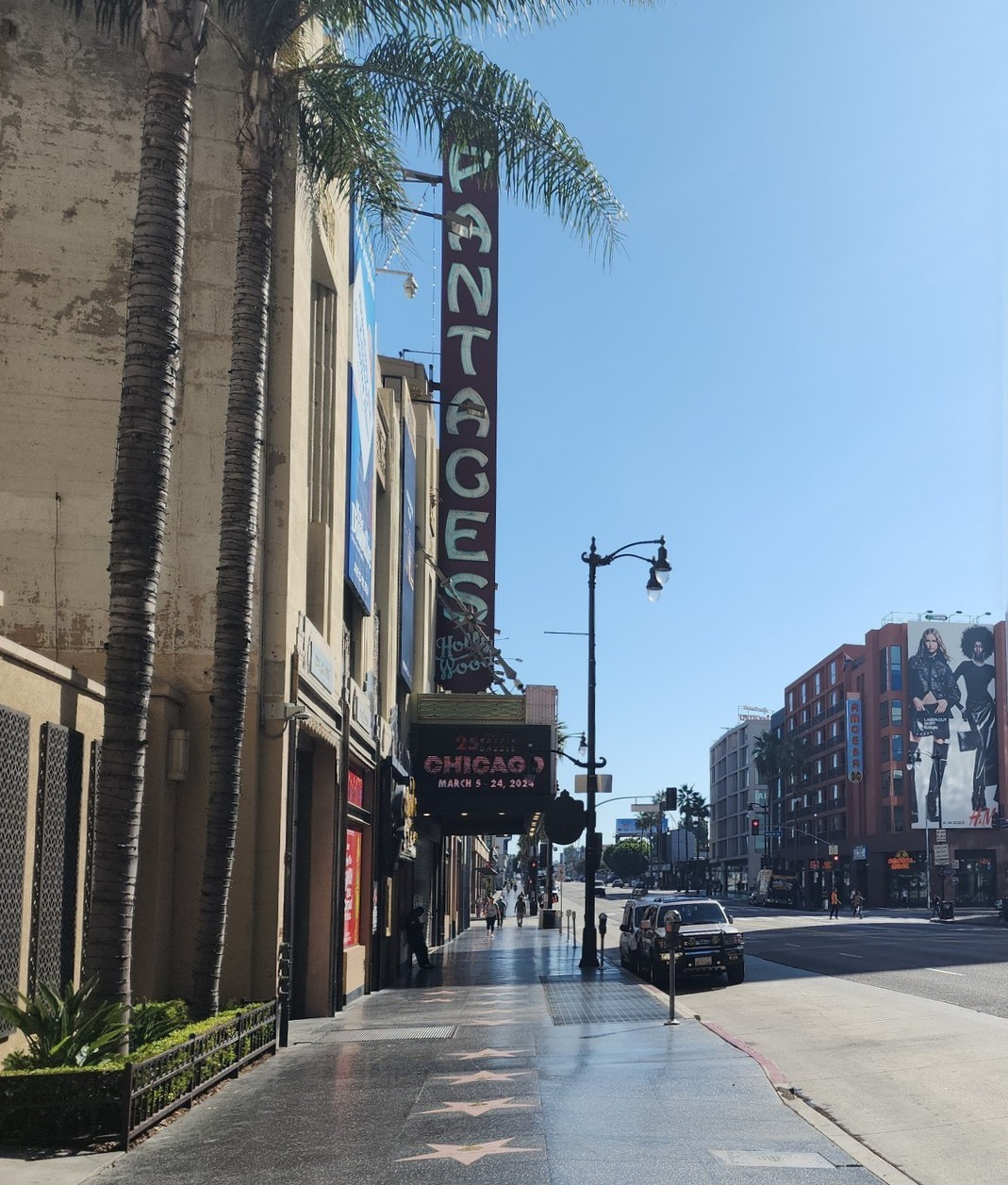
Facing Hollywood Boulevard

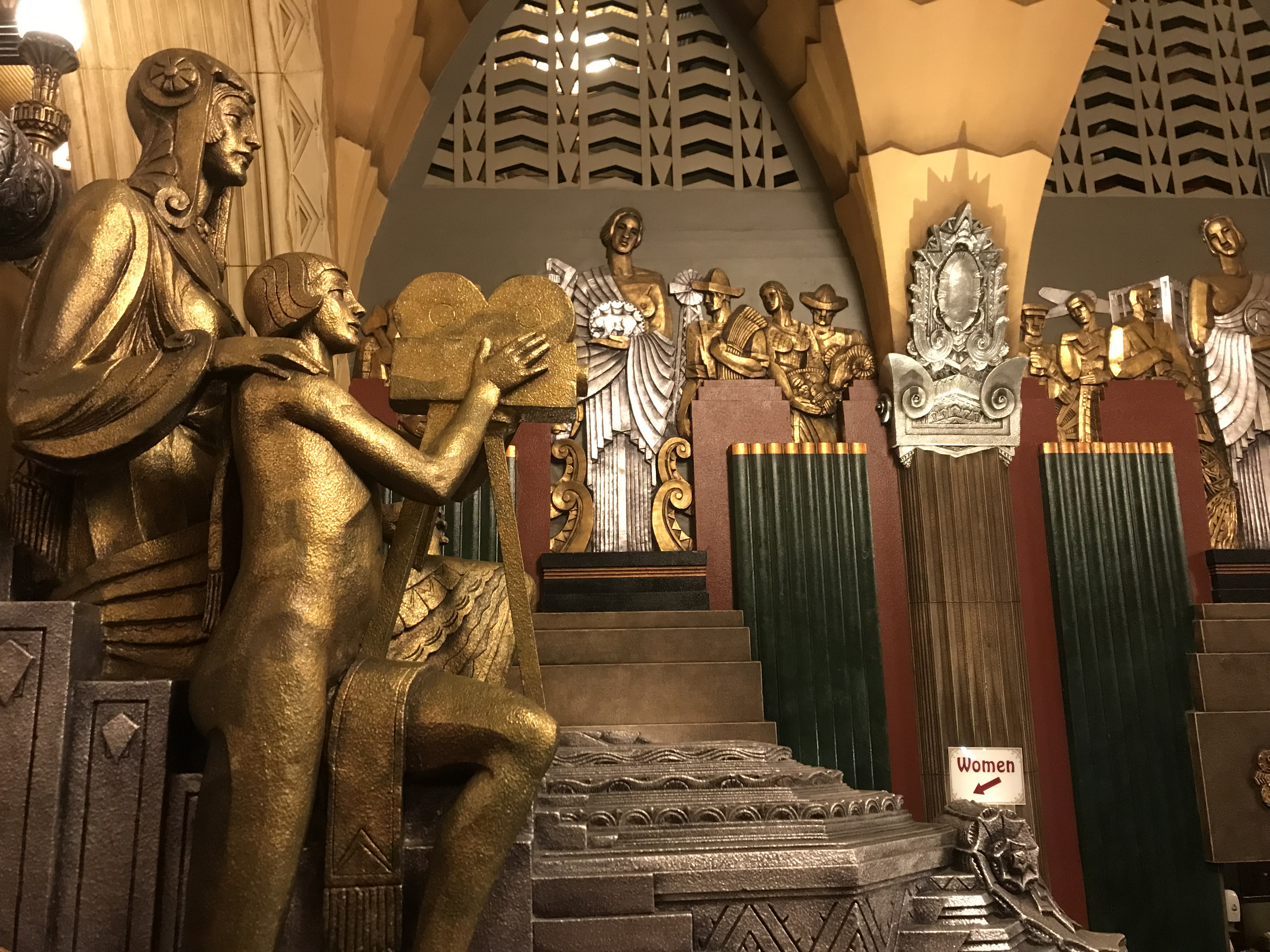
Sculptures in the lobby

Inside, the lobby, a 110-feet wide by 60-feet deep poly-chromatic fan vault, is decorated in a zigzag geometric design with gold and henna shades. The entire area is illuminated by three huge Moderne frosted glass chandeliers hanging from three star-shaped domes. At each end of the lobby is a 20-foot wide carpeted stairway, lined with vaguely Egyptian and Assyro-Babylonian styled statues, one of which depicts in an Art Deco style, a camera crew filming. The lobby also features alcoves, ceiling murals, layered plasterwork, frosted glass sconces, and bronze sunbursts above the elevators.

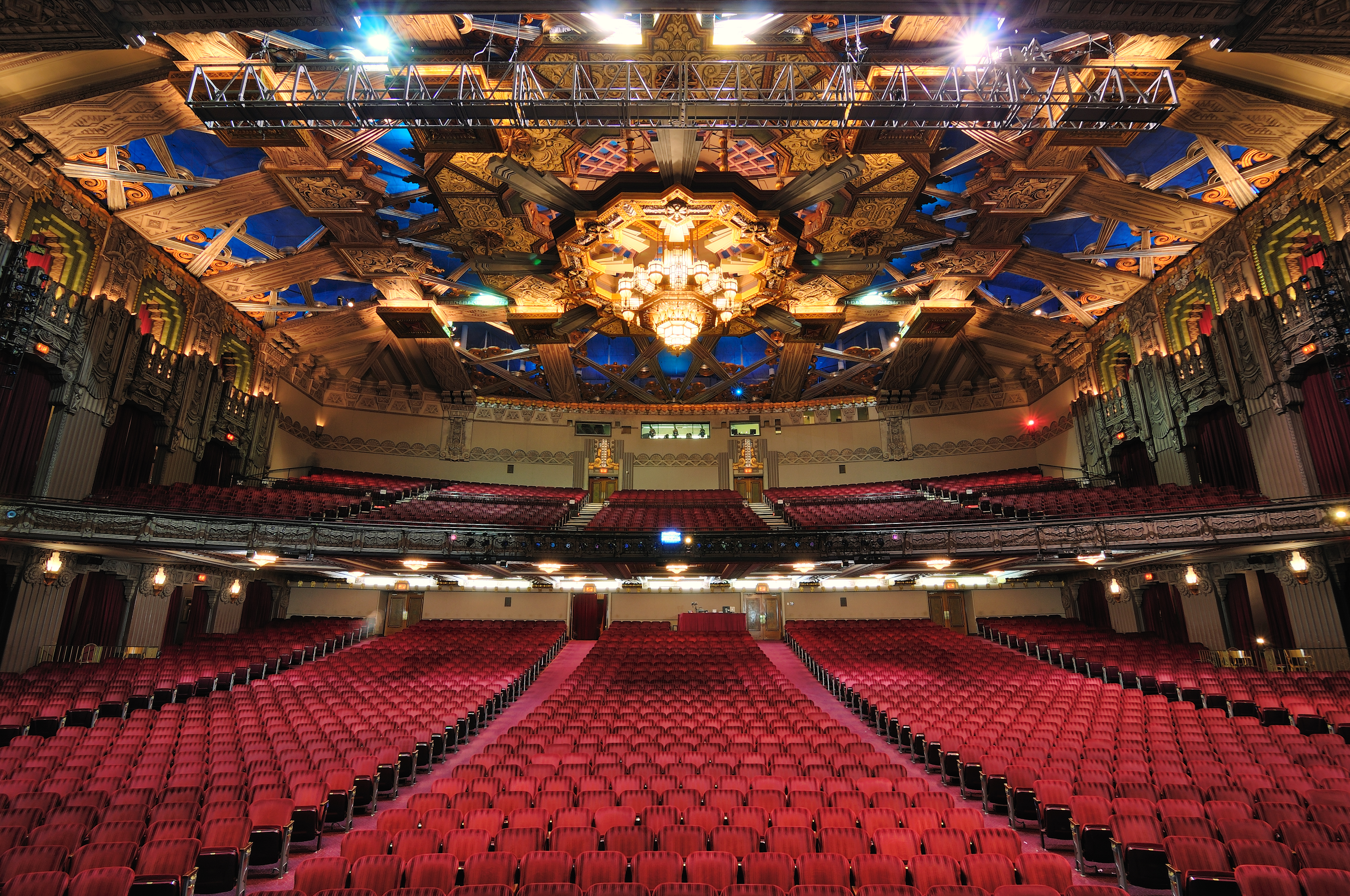
The interior of the theater

The theater's proscenium is 54 feet wide, and above the proscenium are three painted panels, one depicting Apollo leading his snorting steeds, another depicting California oil riches, and the third depicting Native Californians. On each side of the proscenium were originally two small side-stages flanked on the side-walls by large organ chambers. The orchestra pit was on an elevator, and the stage, measuring 180 feet wide and 70 feet deep, is the second largest west of Chicago, after the Shrine Auditorium in downtown Los Angeles.

The crowning beauty of the theater's Art Deco decorations is its double ceiling. Designed by Anthony Heinsbergen, the upper ceiling, colored blue, is visible through the lower ceiling's suspended fretwork sunray effects, the latter of which converge at the ceiling's center, where a large frosted glass and bronze chandelier is hung.

== In popular culture ==
Many concert scenes have been shot at the Pantages, including the 1980 film The Jazz Singer, Michael Jackson's 1995 music video "You Are Not Alone", the Talking Heads 1984 concert film Stop Making Sense, and more.

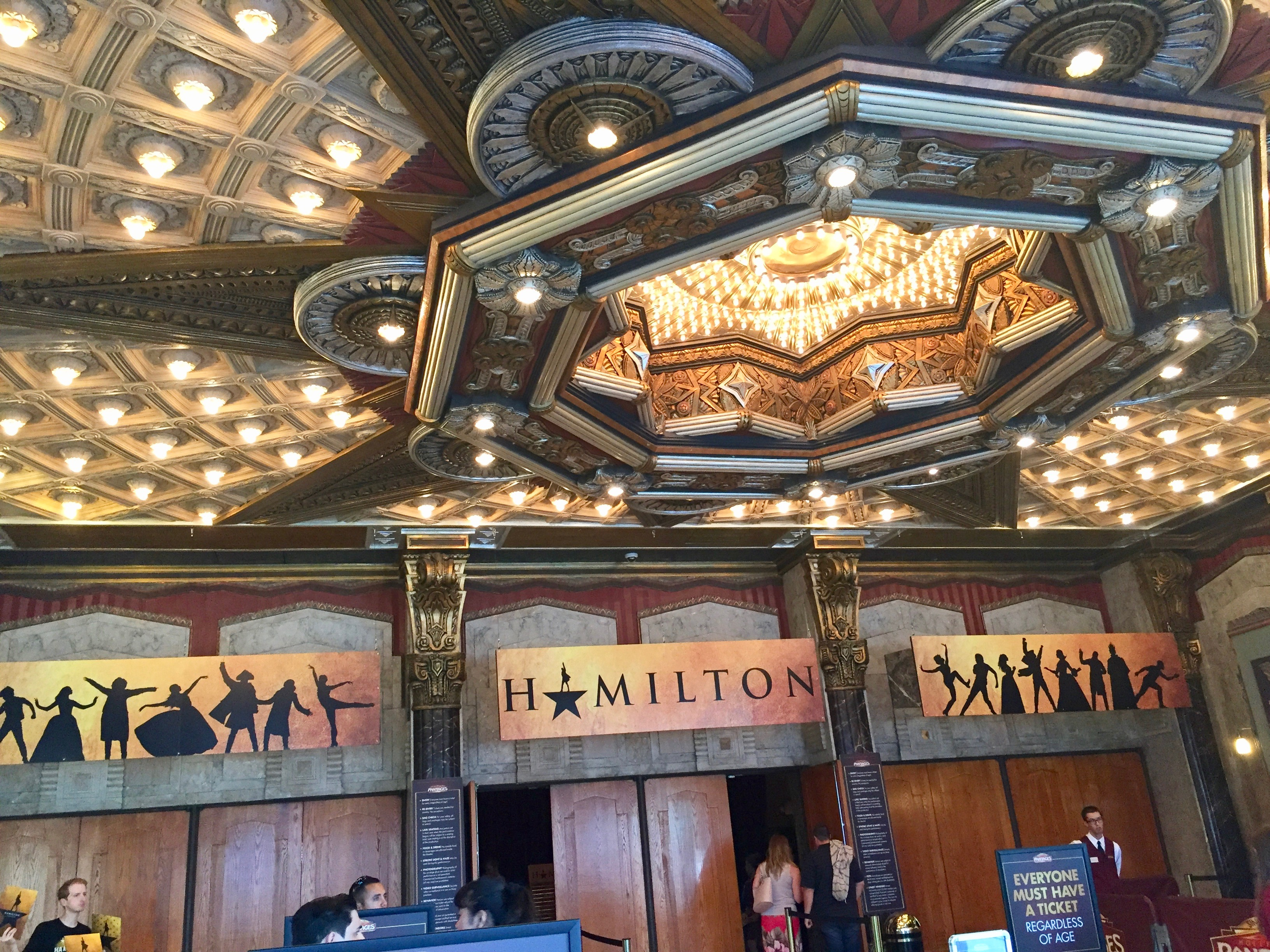
Entryway during the 2017 run of Hamilton

The Academy Award scenes in The Bodyguard were shot in The Pantages, and the theater's interior was used for the Ritz Gotham Hotel in Batman Forever. Other films that shot at The Pantages include Ed Wood and Friends with Benefits.

In October 1995, George Burns taped a TV special commemorating his 100th birthday at this theater.

On March 16th 2003 the theatre was used to celebrate ABC’s 50th anniversary with a special titled ABC’s 50th anniversary celebration. The special aired on May 19th of that year.

Rickie Lee Jones's 1979 self-titled debut album includes a reference to The Pantages in her song "Chuck E.'s In Love".

Disney California Adventure's Hollywood Pictures Backlot façade is based on The Pantages, but only the part of the theater left of its entrance and marquee, hence why the façade doesn’t look like a theater.

== See also ==
- List of Los Angeles Historic-Cultural Monuments in Hollywood
- List of contributing properties in the Hollywood Boulevard Commercial and Entertainment District
