= Para olvidarte de mí =

2009 RBD album

Para Olvidarte de Mí

Studio album by RBD
- Released: March 10, 2009
- Recorded: October – November 2008
- Studio: Igloo Music Studios (Burbank, California), Cosmos Studios (Mexico City, Mexico), Studio 19 (Mexico City, Mexico), Fishhead Studios (Gothenburg, Sweden)
- Genre: Latin pop
- Length: 45:19
- Language: Spanish
- Label: Capitol; EMI
- Producer: Armando Ávila; Carlos Lara; MachoPsycho; Gustavo Borner (co-producer); Pedro Damián (exec.); Emilio Ávila (exec.)

RBD chronology
Greatest Hits (2008)	Para Olvidarte de Mí (2009)	Best Of Remixes (2009)

Singles from Para Olvidarte de Mí
- 1. "Para Olvidarte de Mí" Released: January 26, 2009

Para Olvidarte de Mí (English: To Forget About Me) is the sixth and final studio album by Mexican pop band RBD, a group that gained popularity from Televisa's teenage-oriented TV series, Rebelde. The album was released on March 10, 2009, in Mexico and on March 24, 2009, in the United States. The album belongs to the musical genres of Latin pop and pop rock, with a melodic dance-pop styling.

For promotion purposes, only one single was released from the album, the title-track "Para Olvidarte de Mí". The single's music video was compiled from footage of RBD's previous music videos and live performances.

== Background and production ==
The group announced in October 2008 that Para Olvidarte de Mí was slated to be RBD's last studio album, as the group was disbanding. Group member Maite Perroni announced during an interview that the recording of the farewell album had concluded in November 2008. The album was recorded in Mexico City, under the production of Armando Ávila, Carlos Lara and MachoPsycho.

Following on the footsteps of Empezar Desde Cero, RBD band member Dulce María co-wrote two songs out of the 13 that are on the album. The two compositions are "Más Tuya Que Mía", a song that speaks about the end of a romantic relationship, and "Lágrimas Pérdidas", which deals with the hope of starting again after having gone through disillusion in a relationship. Also following the tradition set by its predecessors, the album features a cover song. The twelfth track "Puedes Ver Pero No Tocar" is a Spanish cover version of the song "You Can Look" by the German band Monrose, from their 2008 album I Am.

== Release ==
Contrary to the group's previous albums, Para Olvidarte de Mí is considered a limited edition, as only 40,000 copies were released for sale in each country. Being that the group officially disbanded after the final show of their Gira Del Adios on December 21, 2008, the album was released after the disbandment of the group. In doing so, no promotion other than the release of the single was made for the album. The anticipation for RBD's last release caused the lead single from the album, the title track, to be leaked onto the Internet on January 26, 2009. The whole album was eventually also leaked onto the Internet on 1 March 2009, more than a week before its official release date. On 10 March RBD regrouped with the exception of Herrera who had work commitments, and held a press conference in Mexico, where they officially presented the album.

"If I could explain with words what they [the fans] made us feel in each country, in each concert, I would. We have a compromise and will be forever indebted to them, there is no way how to tell them goodbye, because they deserve so much more."

—RBD band member Anahí talking about the album.

Much later, in 2010, Dulce María herself presented through her official Twitter account a contest for RBD fans to create a music video made up of the best moments of the disbanded sextet, which would eventually be uploaded to her official YouTube channel. A few weeks after the contest was opened, a new song titled "Llévame" was revealed together with the winning fan-made video. The song was composed by Dulce María and Alfonso Herrera, likely during their final recording sessions for Para Olvidarte de Mí.

== Reception ==
Professional ratings
Review scores
Source	Rating
AllMusic	2/5 stars

=== Critical reception ===
Jason Birchmeier from the online music guide AllMusic gave Para Olvidarte de Mí a 2 out of 5 star review. He considered that the album had a "heavy emphasis on emotional ballads [...] oriented toward the group's core fan base rather than the Latin pop mainstream", while highlighting some of the album tracks like "Camino Al Sol", "¿Quién Te Crees?" and "Puedes Ver Pero No Tocar". Birchmeier ended his review by stating: "As it happened, however, RBD overran the course of their popularity and were left to bid farewell to a greatly diminished fan base, not to mention an otherwise uncaring Latin pop mainstream that had grown increasingly weary of the group as the years passed and the novelty wore thin."

=== Commercial performance ===
Para Olvidarte de Mí is considered RBD's least successful studio album, as only 40,000 copies of the album were distributed in each country in which it was released, and also did not have any significant promotion.

In North America, the album found its greatest success in the group's native Mexico, where it debuted at #7 on the Mexican Albums Chart, compiled by AMPROFON, and later peaked at #3 on its second week of release. However, the album only managed to chart in Mexico for 11 weeks. In the United States, the album peaked at #6 on the Billboard Top Latin Albums chart, and at #3 on Billboard Latin Pop Albums, charting in both rankings for six weeks.

In South America, the album managed to chart in Argentina, where it debuted at #83 on the Argentine Albums Chart, compiled by CAPIF, and later peaked at #10 in its second week on the chart.

In Europe, Para Olvidarte de Mí managed to enter the albums chart in Spain (ranked by PROMUSICAE) at #17 and stayed on the ranking for 8 weeks.

== Track listing ==
Para Olvidarte de Mí
No.	Title	Writer(s)	Producer(s)	Length
1.	"Camino Al Sol"	Debi Nova; Martin "Doc" McKinney	Carlos Lara; Gustavo Borner^{[a]}	3:58
2.	"Mírame"	Cachorro López; Sebastián Schon	Lara; Borner^{[a]}	3:43
3.	"Para Olvidarte de Mí"	Lara; Pedro Muñoz Romero	Lara; Borner^{[a]}	3:23
4.	"¿Quién Te Crees?"	Nate Campany; Jodi Marr; MachoPsycho; Tami Rodríguez	MachoPsycho	3:05
5.	"Esté Donde Esté"	Armando Ávila	Ávila	3:36
6.	"Más Tuya Que Mía"	Dulce María; Felipe Díaz	Ávila	3:41
7.	"Hace Un Instante"	Lara	Lara; Borner^{[a]}	3:43
8.	"Desapareció"	Yoel Henríquez; Rafael Esparza-Ruiz; Ávila; Sheppard Solomon	Ávila	3:20
9.	"Olvidar"	Juan Carlos Perez Soto; Patric Sarin; Jukka Immonen	Lara; Borner^{[a]}	3:00
10.	"Yo Vivo Por Ti"	MachoPsycho; Campany; Marr	MachoPsycho	3:24
11.	"Lágrimas Perdidas"	Ávila; Dulce María	Ávila	3:36
12.	"Puedes Ver Pero No Tocar"	R. Jenssen; N. Harambasic; A. Wiik; R. Svendsen; Lara	Ávila	3:13
13.	"Adiós"	Ávila	Ávila	3:37
Total length:				45:19

Notes

- ^{^[a]} signifies a co-producer
- "Puedes Ver Pero No Tocar" is a cover of the song "You Can Look" by the band Monrose.

== Personnel ==
Credits adapted from the album's liner notes.

Recording locations

- Igloo Music Studios (Burbank, California)
- Cosmos Studios (Mexico City, Mexico)
- Studio 19 (Mexico City, Mexico)
- Fishhead Studios (Gothenburg, Sweden)

Mixing locations

- Igloo Music Studios (Burbank, California)
- Cosmos Studios (Mexico City, Mexico)
- Sound Decision (Austin, Texas)

Mastering location

- Precision Mastering (Los Angeles, California)

Vocals

- RBD – main vocals, choruses
- Armando Ávila – choruses
- Carlos Lara – choruses
- Carlos Murguía – choruses

Musicians

- Armando Ávila – acoustic guitar, B-3, bass, drums, electric guitar, keyboards, Mellotron, piano
- Jimmy Jonson – bass
- Greg Bissonette – drums
- Nick Baxter – guitars
- Michkyn Boyzo – guitars
- Mark Goldberg – guitars
- Javo González – guitars
- Iván Machorro – guitars
- Francisco Oroz – guitars
- Ruy Folguera – keyboards
- Jon Gilutin – keyboards
- Czech National Symphony Orchestra – strings

Production

- Fernando Grediaga – A&R
- Camilo Lara – A&R
- Armando Ávila – arrangements, direction, mixing engineer, producer, programming, recording engineer
- Gustavo Borner – arrangements, co-producer, mastering, mixing engineer, recording engineer
- Ruy Folguera – arrangements, programming
- Iván Machorro – arrangements, programming
- Juan Carlos Moguel – arrangements, mixing engineer, recording engineer
- Justin Moshkevich – arrangements, programming, recording engineer
- Nick Baxter – arrangements, programming, recording engineer
- Luis Luisillo M. – associate producer
- Carolina Palomo – coordination
- Carlos Lara – direction, producer, vocal direction
- MachoPsycho – direction, producer
- Emilio Ávila – executive producer
- Pedro Damián – executive producer
- hulahula.com.mx – graphic design
- Manuel Luna – hairstyling
- B.J. Murphy – hairstyling
- Televisa En Vivo – management
- Alfonso Castro – make-up
- Minerva García – make-up
- Víctor Guadarrama – make-up
- Don Tyler – mastering
- Yvonne Venegas – photography
- Nicolás Ortiz – production assistant
- Daniel Borner – production coordinator
- Mónica Jiménez – production coordinator
- Rotger Rosas – recording assistant
- Fernando Roldán – recording engineer
- Enrique Ávila – studio manager (Cosmos Studios)
- Carlos Murguía – vocal direction
- Carlos Valdés – vocal direction

== Charts ==
Chart (2009)	Peak position
Argentine Albums Chart	10
Mexican Albums Chart	3
Spanish Albums Chart	17
US Billboard 200	192
US Billboard Top Latin Albums	6
US Billboard Latin Pop Albums	3

== Release history ==
Country	Date	Format	Label
Mexico	March 10, 2009	CD, digital download	EMI
Spain	March 17, 2009	CD, digital download	EMI
Brazil	March 23, 2009	CD, digital download	EMI
United States	March 24, 2009	CD, digital download	EMI
Ecuador	April 7, 2009	CD, digital download	EMI
Colombia	April 20, 2009	CD, digital download	EMI
Venezuela	May 11, 2009	CD, digital download	EMI
