= Tour Generación RBD En Vivo =

Live album by RBD

Tour Generación RBD en Vivo

Live album by RBD
- Released: 19 July 2005
- Recorded: 27 May 2005
- Venues: Palacio de los Deportes, Mexico City, Mexico
- Genre: Latin pop
- Length: 72:32 (Mexican edition); 46:46 (US edition)
- Language: Spanish
- Labels: EMI; Capitol; Televisa
- Producers: Armando Ávila; Pedro Damián (executive); Camilo Lara (executive)

RBD chronology
Rebelde (2004)	Tour Generación RBD en Vivo (2005)	Nuestro Amor (2005)

Professional ratings
Review scores
Source	Rating
Allmusic	2/5 stars

Tour Generación RBD en Vivo (English: RBD Generation Tour Live) is the first live album released by Mexican pop band RBD. The album was recorded live in May 2005 at a concert from the band's Tour Generación RBD in Mexico City's Palacio de los Deportes, and released on 19 July. It features songs from their debut album Rebelde and one new live track; two medleys of popular songs are included in the album's Mexican edition, while the edition released in the U.S. features a track that later appeared on their second studio album, Nuestro Amor.

The album was certified platinum (Latin) in the United States for over 100,000 copies sold in February 2006. The album mirrored this success in Brazil, where it reached the number one position, spending several weeks at the top of the charts.

The album was released in Spain on 11 September 2006. A DVD of the tour was also released, which was titled Tour Generación RBD en Vivo as well.

== Background and release ==
The live album was recorded on 27 May 2005 during RBD's concert in the Palacio de los Deportes in Mexico City, as part of their Tour Generación RBD, which visited over 30 Mexican cities, in addition to countries such as Venezuela, Colombia, Puerto Rico and Ecuador. On 19 July 2005 the standard edition of the album was released in Latin America and the United States.

On 2 March 2006 a Diamond Edition of the album was released, which includes tracks in Portuguese, games, a documentary and photos of the band.

== Commercial performance ==
The album was a commercial success in both Mexico and the United States. The album reached number one on the Mexican Albums Chart and was certified platinum + gold for sales of 150,000 copies. In the United States, the album reached No. 29 on the Billboard Top Heatseekers Albums chart, managing to stay on the chart for eight weeks. On the Billboard Top Latin Albums chart, it reached No. 22 and remained there for 33 weeks, while on Billboard Latin Pop Albums it peaked at No. 6 and spent 28 weeks on the chart. The RIAA certified the album platinum (Latin) for sales of 100,000 copies.

The album also had a favorable reception in Spain. The album peaked at No. 13 on the Spanish Albums Chart, where it ranked for 18 weeks. PROMUSICAE certified the album gold for sales of 40,000 copies in Spain. It was also well received in Brazil, where the album charted at No. 16 on the Brazilian Albums Chart.

== Track listing ==
Tour Generación RBD En Vivo – Mexican edition
No.	Title	Writer(s)	Length
1.	"Rebelde"	DJ Kafka, (Note: Carlos Lara billed as DJ Kafka) Max di Carlo	3:59
2.	"Otro Día Que Va"	DJ Kafka, di Carlo	3:30
3.	"Medley 1" ("Me He Enamorado De Un Fan"/"No Sé Si Es Amor"/"Ámame Hasta Con Los Dientes"/"Rayo Rebelde"/"Baile Del Sapo"/"Me Vale")	Ignacio Cano, Memo Méndez Guiú, Jim Jacobs, Warren Casey, Julissa, Richard O' Brian, Alex González	13:24
4.	"Enséñame"	Javier Calderón	3:33
5.	"Futuro Ex-Novio"	Sean & Dame, (Note: Sean Hosein and Dane DeViller billed as Sean & Dame) Steve Smith, Anthony Anderson, Michkin Boyzo	3:00
6.	"A Rabiar"	Karen Sokoloff, (Note: Max di Carlo billed as Karen Sokoloff) Polen Thomas (Note: Lynda Thomas billed as Polen Thomas)	3:13
7.	"Una Canción"	José Roberto Matera, (Note: Joe Carvajal billed as José Roberto Matera) C. Johann Turbay Daccarett	3:41
8.	"Medley 2" ("Cuando Baja La Marea"/"Te Quiero"/"Verano Peligroso"/"Devuélveme A Mi Chica"/"La Chica Del Bikini Azul"/"Viviendo De Noche"/"De Música Ligera"/"Es Mejor Así")	Consuelo Arango, Marella Cayre, David Summers Rodríguez, J.R. Flórez, Honorio Herrero, J. Losada Calvo, D. Maroto, Zeta Bosio, Gustavo Cerati, Giuseppe Dati, Raf	15:34
9.	"Fuego"	Double N, (Note: Niklas Bergwall and Niclas Kings billed as Double N) RamPac, (Note: Johan Ramström and Patrik Magnusson billed as RamPac) Papa Dee, Boyzo	3:03
10.	"Sálvame"	DJ Kafka, di Carlo, Pedro Damián	3:47
11.	"Tenerte Y Quererte"	Guy Roche, Amy Powers, di Carlo	3:23
12.	"Un Poco De Tu Amor"	DJ Kafka, di Carlo	4:42
13.	"Solo Quédate En Silencio"	Mauricio L. Arriaga	3:43
14.	"Rebelde" (Cumbia version)	DJ Kafka, di Carlo	3:54
Total length:			72:32

Tour Generación RBD En Vivo – US edition
No.	Title	Writer(s)	Length
1.	"Rebelde"	DJ Kafka, di Carlo	3:59
2.	"Otro Día Que Va"	DJ Kafka, di Carlo	3:30
3.	"Enséñame"	Calderón	3:33
4.	"Futuro Ex-Novio"	Sean & Dame, Smith, Anderson, Boyzo	3:00
5.	"A Rabiar"	Sokoloff, Thomas	3:13
6.	"Una Canción"	Matera, Turbay Daccarett	3:41
7.	"Fuego"	Double N, RamPac, Papa Dee, Boyzo	3:03
8.	"Sálvame"	DJ Kafka, di Carlo, Damián	3:47
9.	"Tenerte Y Quererte"	Roche, Powers, di Carlo	3:23
10.	"Un Poco De Tu Amor"	DJ Kafka, di Carlo	4:42
11.	"Solo Quédate En Silencio"	Arriaga	3:43
12.	"Rebelde" (Cumbia version)	DJ Kafka, di Carlo	3:54
13.	"Liso, Sensual" (Studio version)	Sokoloff, Thomas	3:12
14.	"Solo Quédate En Silencio" (Music video)
Total length:			46:46

- The songs "Santa No Soy" and "Cuando El Amor Se Acaba" (Maite's first solo) were a part of the tour set list but were not included on either edition of the album.
- The song, "Liso, Sensual" was later featured on their second album, Nuestro Amor.

=== Edición Diamante ===
Tour Generacion RBD En Vivo Edición Diamante

Live album by RBD
- Released: 2 March 2006
- Recorded: 27 May 2005
- Venue: Palacio de los Deportes
- Length: 56:58 (only with new tracks)
- Languages: Spanish (live tracks); Portuguese (studio tracks)
- Label: EMI

RBD chronology
Rebelde (Edição Brasil) (2005)	Tour Generacion RBD En Vivo Edición Diamante (2006)	Live in Hollywood (2006)

Tour Generación RBD En Vivo – Edición Diamante (Enhanced content)
No.	Title	Length
1.	"Salva-me (studio version)"	3:43
2.	"Um Pouco Desse Amor (studio version)"	3:20
3.	"Ensina-me (studio version)"	3:39
4.	"Photo Gallery"
5.	"Wallpapers & Icons"
6.	"Documentary"
7.	"RBD Game"

Note

- Apart from the enhanced content, the 'Edición Diamante' followed the same track list as the Mexican edition of the standard album, except "Liso, Sensual" was added as the last track.

== Personnel ==
Credits adapted from the album's liner notes.

Mastered at
- Cosmos Mastering, Mexico

Vocals

- RBD – all vocals
Musicians
- Güido Laris – guitars, bass guitar
- Mauricio Soto Lartigue – drums

Production

- Camilo Lara – A&R
- Melissa Mochulske – A&R coordination
- Güido Laris – arrangements
- Pedro Damián – executive producer
- Carlos Lara – executive producer
- Luis Luisillo Miguel – associate producer
- Emilio Ávila – executive producer (concert)
- Hula Hula – graphic design, additional photography
- Armando Ávila – mixer, producer
- Marisol Alcelay – product manager, marketing
- Carolina Palomo Ramos – production coordinator
- Andrew Rose – recording assistant
- Juan Carlos Moguel – additional recording
- Ricardo Trabulsi – photographer
- Gabriel Alarcón – additional photography
- Víctor Deschamps – additional photography

== Accolades ==
Year	Ceremony	Award	Result
2006	Billboard Latin Music Awards	Latin Pop Album of the Year, Duo or Group	Nominated

== Chart positions ==
Chart	Peak Position
Brazilian Albums Chart	16
Colombian Albums Chart	10
Ecuadorian Albums Chart	1
European Top 100 Albums	98
Mexican Albums Chart	1
Romanian Albums Chart	10
Spain Albums Chart	13
US Billboard 200	106
US Billboard Top Latin Albums	22
US Billboard Latin Pop Albums	6
US Billboard Top Heatseekers	29

== Certifications ==
Region	Certification	Certified units/sales
Mexico (AMPROFON)	Platinum+Gold	150,000^{^}
Mexico (AMPROFON) DVD	2× Platinum+Gold	50,000^{^}
Spain (Promusicae) DVD	2× Platinum	50,000^{^}
United States (RIAA)	Platinum (Latin)	100,000^{^}
^{^} Shipments figures based on certification alone.

== Release history ==
Region	Date	Format	Label
Mexico	July 19, 2005	CD, digital download	EMI
United States	July 19, 2005	CD, digital download	EMI
Worldwide	March 2, 2006	'Edición Diamante' – CD, digital download	EMI
Mexico	December 2020	Double CD-DVD	Universal Music

== See also ==
- Tour Generación RBD En Vivo (DVD)
