= El Último Tour del Mundo 2022 =

2022 concert tour by Bad Bunny

El Último Tour Del Mundo 2022
- Continental tour by Bad Bunny
- Location: North America
- Associated album: YHLQMDLG; El Último Tour Del Mundo
- Start date: February 9, 2022
- End date: April 3, 2022
- Legs: 1
- No. of shows: 35
- Attendance: 575,000
- Box office: $117 million

Bad Bunny concert chronology
- X 100Pre Tour (2019); El Último Tour Del Mundo (2022); World's Hottest Tour (2022)

El Último Tour Del Mundo 2022 was the third concert tour by Bad Bunny, in support of his second and third studio albums YHLQMDLG and El Último Tour Del Mundo, both released in 2020. The tour started on February 9, 2022 in Denver and ended in Miami on April 3, 2022. It had one leg in the United States and 35 shows in total. The tour was a box office success with all the dates sold out. It grossed a total of $117 million with a total attendance over 575,000 fans, making it the highest grossing tour by a Latin artist in Billboard Boxscore history up that point. Also, it was the fastest selling tour since 2018. On average, Bad Bunny's tour has had a per-show ticket count of 15,990 and a gross of $3.2 million.

== Background ==
Bad Bunny had originally planned to tour the world in 2020 in support of his second studio album YHLQMDLG. A massive European leg was scheduled to happen in the summer, with Martinez headlining A-list festivals such as Primavera Sound. However, due to the COVID-19 pandemic, most dates were pushed back to 2021 and later to 2022. On April 11, 2021, a brand new North American arena tour of Bad Bunny was announced during WrestleMania 37.

== Critical reception ==
Emmalyse Brownstein from Miami Times attended to the concert on the FTX Arena and gave a positive review titled "Bad Bunny Held the Crowd in the Palm of His Hand During El Último Tour del Mundo at FTX Arena". Consequent Sound praised the first show of the tour and stated on their review: "The energy stepping inside the arena was palpable, and proud — an earnest reflection of the many attendees’ thoughts on seeing the boy who came from humble beginnings in Puerto Rico now selling out arenas".

== Shows ==
List of concerts, showing date, city, country, venue, attendance (tickets sold / total available), and gross revenue
Date	City	Country	Venue	Attendance	Revenue
North America
February 9, 2022	Denver	United States	Ball Arena	16,979 / 16,979	$3,067,378
February 11, 2022	El Paso	United States	Don Haskins Center	12,131 / 12,131	$2,305,986
February 13, 2022	Hidalgo	United States	Payne Arena	6,524 / 6,524	$1,801,518
February 16, 2022	Houston	United States	Toyota Center	30,661 / 30,661	$5,220,928
February 17, 2022	Houston	United States	Toyota Center	30,661 / 30,661	$5,220,928
February 18, 2022	Dallas	United States	American Airlines Center	35,730 / 35,730	$8,522,949
February 19, 2022	Dallas	United States	American Airlines Center	35,730 / 35,730	$8,522,949
February 23, 2022	San Diego	United States	Pechanga Arena	13,198 / 13,198	$2,724,772
February 24, 2022	Los Angeles	United States	Crypto.com Arena	17,053 / 17,053	$3,552,044
February 25, 2022	Inglewood	United States	Kia Forum	33,245 / 33,245	$9,648,608
February 26, 2022	Inglewood	United States	Kia Forum	33,245 / 33,245	$9,648,608
February 28, 2022	Portland	United States	Moda Center	17,360 / 17,360	$3,001,008
March 1, 2022	Seattle	United States	Climate Pledge Arena	16,477 / 16,477	$3,056,808
March 3, 2022	San Jose	United States	SAP Center	35,305 / 35,305	$7,919,315
March 4, 2022	San Jose	United States	SAP Center	35,305 / 35,305	$7,919,315
March 5, 2022	Las Vegas	United States	MGM Grand Garden Arena	12,940 / 12,940	$2,953,364
March 6, 2022	Phoenix	United States	Footprint Center	16,085 / 16,085	$3,151,730
March 10, 2022	Rosemont	United States	Allstate Arena	51,430 / 51,430	$11,245,170
March 11, 2022	Rosemont	United States	Allstate Arena	51,430 / 51,430	$11,245,170
March 12, 2022	Rosemont	United States	Allstate Arena	51,430 / 51,430	$11,245,170
March 14, 2022	Toronto	Canada	Scotiabank Arena	17,579 / 17,579	$2,247,259
March 16, 2022	Philadelphia	United States	Wells Fargo Center	17,680 / 17,680	$2,517,650
March 18, 2022	Newark	United States	Prudential Center	16,593 / 16,593	$3,832,788
March 19, 2022	Brooklyn	United States	Barclays Center	32,999 / 32,999	$7,217,349
March 20, 2022	Brooklyn	United States	Barclays Center	32,999 / 32,999	$7,217,349
March 22, 2022	Boston	United States	TD Garden	16,455 / 16,455	$3,081,433
March 23, 2022	Montreal	Canada	Bell Centre	19,317 / 19,317	$2,205,162
March 25, 2022	Washington, D.C.	United States	Capital One Arena	18,244 / 18,244	$3,529,181
March 26, 2022	Charlotte	United States	Spectrum Center	17,659 / 17,659	$2,967,614
March 27, 2022	Atlanta	United States	State Farm Arena	15,026 / 15,026	$2,988,345
March 29, 2022	Orlando	United States	Amway Center	33,200 / 33,200	$5,598,339
March 30, 2022	Orlando	United States	Amway Center	33,200 / 33,200	$5,598,339
April 1, 2022	Miami	United States	FTX Arena	54,998 / 54,998	$12,396,368
April 2, 2022	Miami	United States	FTX Arena	54,998 / 54,998	$12,396,368
April 3, 2022	Miami	United States	FTX Arena	54,998 / 54,998	$12,396,368

== See also ==
- List of Billboard Boxscore number-one concert series of the 2020s
