= List of highest-grossing concert tours by Latin artists =

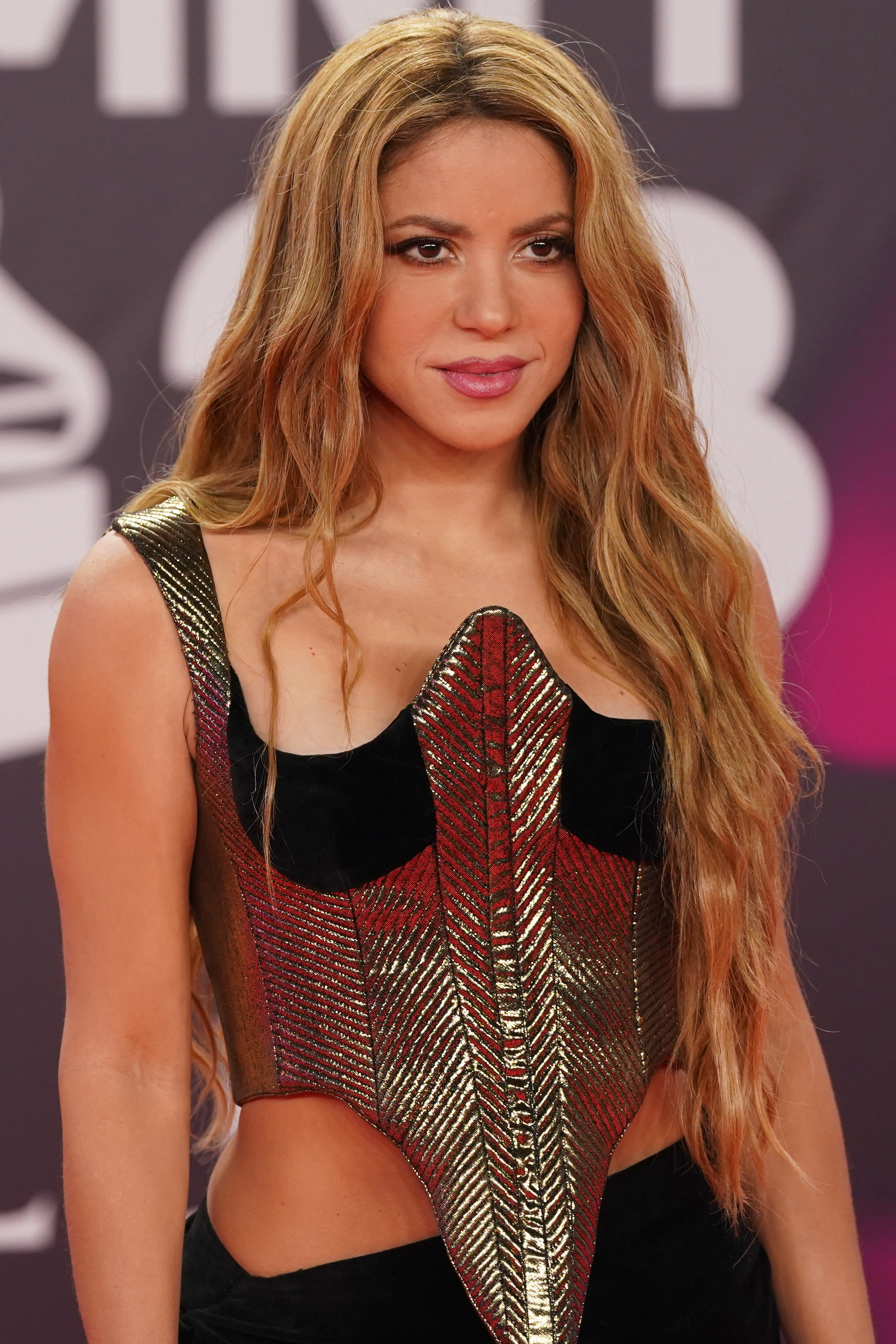
Shakira's Las Mujeres Ya No Lloran is the highest-grossing tour by a Latin artist.

This is a list of the highest-grossing concert tours in the Latin industry. (Note: Artists such as Jennifer Lopez (US) and Enrique Iglesias (Spain) are included because they are often cited by either Pollstar and Billboard Box Score reports in the Latin category.) Billboard and Pollstar are two major publications that regularly provide the official figure of concerts' gross revenue worldwide. Billboard launched the boxscore ranking in 1975 through its spin-off magazine Amusement Business, and it has been also featured in the Billboard magazine itself since the issue date of October 3, 1981. Pollstar began reporting the box office data since November 29, 1981. However, there are many missing data in the early reporting of both publications, hence some few claims are mostly based on other non-specialist sources.

Shakira's Las Mujeres Ya No Lloran is the highest-grossing concert tour of all time by a Latin act, while Bad Bunny's Debí Tirar Más Fotos is the highest-grossing Latin tour by a male act, and RBD's Soy Rebelde Tour is the highest-grossing Latin tour by a group.

== Highest-grossing Latin tours ==
Keys
†	Indicates an ongoing tour

Top 20 highest-grossing Latin tours of all time
Rank	Peak	Actual gross	Adjusted gross (in 2025 dollars)	Artist	Tour title	Year	Shows	Average gross	Ref.
1	1	$565,500,000	$565,500,000	Shakira	Las Mujeres Ya No Lloran World Tour †	2025–2026	124	$4,560,484	
2	1	$467,472,815	$479,770,816	Bad Bunny	Debí Tirar Más Fotos World Tour	2025–2026	55	$8,499,506	
3	1	$424,347,470	$433,438,618	Luis Miguel	Luis Miguel Tour 2023–24	2023–2024	191	$2,221,715	
4	1	$314,445,480	$345,947,239	Bad Bunny	World's Hottest Tour	2022	43	$7,312,686	
5	2	$313,320,445	$331,080,745	Karol G	Mañana Será Bonito Tour	2023–2024	65	$4,820,315	
6	5	$269,111,394 (Note: Conversion of 1.5 billion reais to US dollars in December 2025.)	$276,191,019	Thiaguinho	Tardezinha	2015–2025	162	$1,661,181	
7	2	$231,733,992	$244,869,634	RBD	Soy Rebelde Tour	2023	54	$4,291,370	
8	5	$211,351,833	$223,332,130	Bad Bunny	Most Wanted Tour	2024	49	$4,313,303	
9	2	$198,000,000	$217,836,025	Daddy Yankee	La Última Vuelta World Tour	2022	83	$2,383,133	
10	1	$117,000,000	$128,721,287	Bad Bunny	El Último Tour del Mundo	2022	35	$3,342,857	
11	1	$115,000,000 (Note: From 127 shows reported.)	$144,816,478	Luis Miguel	México Por Siempre Tour	2018–2019	150	$905,512	
12	9	$112,709,553	$119,098,397	Aventura	Cerrando Ciclos	2024	56	$2,012,671	
13	9	$106,200,000	$112,219,856	Romeo Santos	Fórmula, Vol. 3: La Gira	2023	64	$1,659,375	
14	1	$100,000,000	$155,272,027	Shakira	Oral Fixation Tour	2006–2007	119	$840,336	
15	5	$97,200,000	$106,937,685	Karol G	Strip Love Tour	2022	30	$3,240,000	
16	1	$95,000,000	$147,508,426	Luis Miguel	México En La Piel Tour	2005–2007	129	$736,434	
17	4	$80,100,000 (Note: From only 28 shows reported in 2022.)	$88,124,574	Grupo Firme	Enfiestados y Amanecidos Tour	2022	28	$3,640,909	
18	3	$76,800,000 (Note: From only 50 of 145 shows.)	$104,315,597	Violetta	Violetta Live	2015	50	$1,536,000	
19	3	$69,100,000 (Note: According to Pollstar: 2010 North American dates (16.9 million) and 2011 dates (53.2 million))	$98,896,820	Shakira	The Sun Comes Out World Tour	2011	70	$987,143	
20	4	$60,192,412 (Note: From only 49 of 54 shows.)	$84,412,463	Jennifer Lopez	Dance Again World Tour	2012	54 (Note: During the tour, Lopez and Enrique Iglesias co-headlined a separate North American tour, Enrique Iglesias & Jennifer Lopez Tour, which grossed $21.2 million across 24 shows.)	$1,052,000	

== Highest-grossing Latin tours by year ==
Highest-grossing Latin tours annually
Year	Actual gross	Adjusted gross (in 2025 dollars)	Artist	Tour title	Ref.
2000	$36,300,000 (Note: North American dates only)	$67,865,217	Ricky Martin	Livin' la Vida Loca Tour	
2002	$16,197,899	$28,994,389	Luis Miguel	Mis Romances Tour	
2004	$17,500,000	$29,829,545	Luis Miguel	33 Tour	
2005	$16,800,000	$27,694,667	Luis Miguel	México En La Piel Tour	
2006	$30,906,173	$49,359,066	RBD	Tour Generación RBD	
2007	$33,900,000	$52,637,217	Maná	Amar es Combatir Tour	
2009	$18,500,000	$27,762,913	Luis Miguel	Cómplices Tour	
2010	$16,900,000	$24,951,549	Shakira	The Sun Comes Out World Tour	
2011	$53,200,000	$76,140,533	Shakira	The Sun Comes Out World Tour	
2012	$60,192,412	$84,412,463	Jennifer Lopez (Note: The all-Spanish language act to top the 2012 list was Maná with $36.2 million)	Dance Again World Tour	
2013	$31,300,000	$43,261,071	Marc Anthony	Vivir Mi Vida World Tour	
2014	$37,100,000	$50,455,791	Marc Anthony	Cambio De Piel Tour	
2015	$76,800,000	$104,315,597	Violetta (Note: Cast of the TV series Violetta. The soloist Latin performer of that year was Juan Gabriel with $58 million)	Violetta Live	
2016	$41,100,000	$55,136,231	Marc Anthony	Marc Anthony Live	
2017	$42,800,000	$56,216,400	Enrique Iglesias and Pitbull	Enrique Iglesias and Pitbull Live	
2018	$61,500,000	$78,851,378	Luis Miguel	México Por Siempre Tour	
2019	$54,700,000	$68,882,273	Jennifer Lopez (Note: The all-Spanish language act to top the 2019 list was Luis Miguel with $39.5 million)	It's My Party	
2020	$24,100,000	$29,981,677	Aventura	Inmortal Tour	
2021	$49,700,000	$59,050,411	Los Bukis	Una Historia Cantada	
2022	$314,000,000	$345,457,130	Bad Bunny	World's Hottest Tour	
2023	$146,900,000	$155,226,900	Karol G	Mañana Será Bonito Tour	
2024	$290,400,000	$298,039,673	Luis Miguel	Luis Miguel Tour 2023–24	
2025	$421,600,000	$432,691,206	Shakira	Las Mujeres Ya No Lloran World Tour	

== Highest-grossing Latin live music artists ==
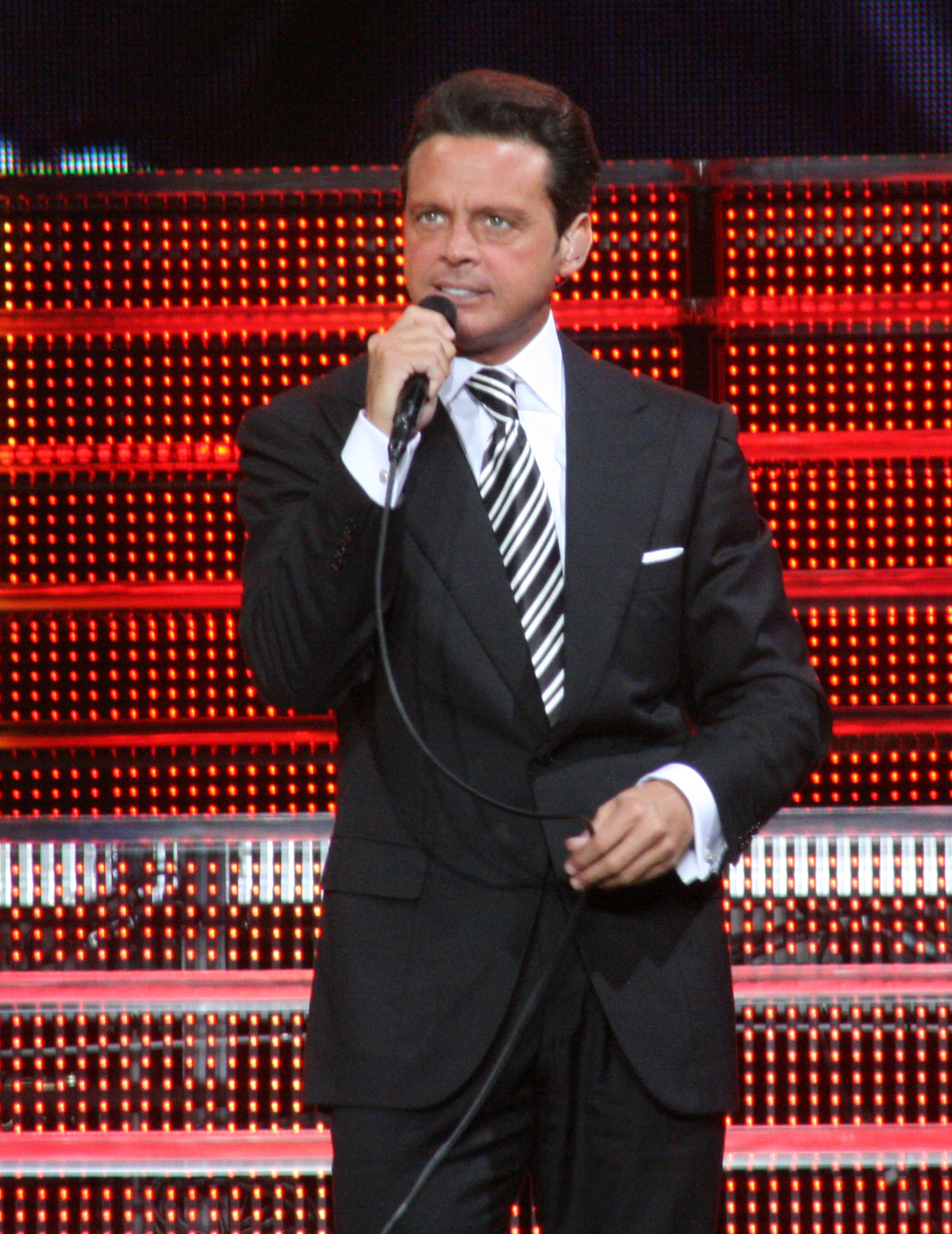
Luis Miguel remains the highest-grossing live Latin music artist and has the second highest-grossing tour.

Highest-grossing Latin tours annually
Rank	Artist	Nationality	Nominal gross	Tickets sold	As of	Ref.
1	Luis Miguel	Mexico	$633.1 million	6.3 million	2024	
2	Shakira	Colombia	$529.7 million	4.9 million	2026	
3	Bad Bunny	Puerto Rico	$508.7 million	3.3 million	2023	
4	Karol G	Colombia	$400.9 million	2.96 million	2024	
5	RBD	Mexico	$350.9 million	3.7 million	2024	
6	Marc Anthony	United States	$315 million	3.8 million	2023	
7	Daddy Yankee	Puerto Rico	$224.7 million	2.4 million	2023	
8	Maná	México	$197.39 million	2.9 million	2022	
9	Jennifer Lopez	United States	$191.6 million	1.4 million	2023	
10	Enrique Iglesias	Spain	$176.1 million	3.2 million	2023	
11	Alejandro Fernandez	Mexico	$161.7 million	2.6 million	2023	
12	Juan Gabriel	Mexico	$157.2 million	2.5 million	2023	
13	Ricky Martin	Puerto Rico	$157.1 million	2.5 million	2023	
14	Ricardo Arjona	Guatemala	$154.6 million	2 million	2023	
15	Pitbull	United States	$151.4 million	2.8 million	2023	
16	Grupo Firme	Mexico	$149 million	1.4 million	2023	
17	Vicente Fernandez	Mexico	$138 million	1.8 million	2023	
18	Romeo Santos	United States	$133.4 million	1.4 million	2023	
19	Chayanne	Puerto Rico	$118 million	1.8 million	2023	
20	Marco Antonio Solis	Mexico	$106.6 million	1.5 million	2023	
21	Gloria Trevi	Mexico	$96.18 million	1.7 million	2024	
22	Maluma	Colombia	$95.9 million	1.1 million	2023	

== See also ==
- Touring industry
  - List of highest-grossing concert tours
  - List of highest-grossing concert tours by women
  - List of highest-grossing concert residencies
  - List of highest-grossing live music artists
  - List of most-attended concerts
  - List of most-attended concert tours
- Latin music
  - List of best-selling Latin music artists
  - List of best-selling Latin albums
