= Para olvidarte de mí (song) =

"Para Olvidarte de Mí"

Single by RBD

from the album Para Olvidarte de Mí
- Language: Spanish
- English title: "To Forget About Me"
- Released: January 26, 2009
- Genre: Latin pop
- Label: EMI
- Songwriters: Carlos Lara; Pedro Damián
- Producers: Carlos Lara; Gustavo Borner (co-producer)

RBD singles chronology
"Y No Puedo Olvidarte" (2008)	"Para Olvidarte de Mí" (2009)	"Siempre He Estado Aquí" (2020)

Music video
- "Para Olvidarte De Mí" on YouTube

"Para Olvidarte de Mí" is a song by Mexican pop group RBD, recorded for their sixth studio album of the same name. It was released on 26 January 2009, by EMI as the lead and only single of the album, as well as being the band's then-final single. Containing a melancholic tone, the track was written and produced by Carlos Lara, with additional writing from Pedro Damián and co-production from Gustavo Borner, and is the group's goodbye song to their loyal fanbase.

Its music video, which premiered on Mexico's Televisa network, consists of clips from behind-the-scenes footage, the band's numerous performances, and the telenovela Rebelde. The clip serves as a way of looking back at RBD's trajectory, and for fans to remember all the moments they spent with the group.

== Background and release ==
On 15 August 2008, after four years together, RBD announced their separation through a press release. They embarked on their Tour del Adiós, which started in October and ended in December. Band member Maite Perroni revealed that recording for their last studio album had ended in November. Before its release, Hispanic American network Univision stated that the song had been leaked onto the internet, forcing the band to release it earlier than it was planned. "Para Olvidarte De Mí" was released as the only single from the album, and lacked any promotion apart from its music video.

== Music video ==
The song's music video contains footage of the band from behind-the scenes, their music videos, the telenovela Rebelde, and their third DVD Live in Rio, recorded in October 2006.

== Awards and nominations ==
Year	Award	Category	Result	Ref.
2009	Premios Juventud	Catchiest Tune	Nominated	
2009	Premios Juventud	Best Ballad	Nominated	
2009	Premios Juventud	My Favorite Video	Nominated	
2009	Premios Juventud	My Ringtone	Nominated	

== Charts ==
=== Weekly charts ===
Chart (2005)	Peak position
Panama (EFE)	1

== Credits and personnel ==
- Alfonso Herrera – vocals
- Anahí – vocals
- Carlos Lara – producer, songwriter
- Christian Chávez – vocals
- Christopher von Uckermann – vocals
- Dulce María – vocals
- Gustavo Borner – producer
- Maite Perroni – vocals
- Pedro Damián – songwriter
