= Aún hay algo =

2005 single by Mexican pop group RBD

"Aún Hay Algo"

Single by RBD

from the album Nuestro Amor
- Language: Spanish
- English title: "There's Still Something"
- Released: 18 November 2005
- Recorded: 2005
- Genre: Latin pop; pop rock; Teen pop
- Length: 3:34
- Label: EMI
- Songwriters: Kylie Minogue; Carlos Lara; Max di Carlo
- Producers: Lara; di Carlo; Pedro Damián (executive)

RBD singles chronology
"Nuestro Amor" (2005)	"Aún Hay Algo" (2005)	"Tras De Mí" (2006)

Music video
- "Aún Hay Algo" on YouTube

"Aún Hay Algo" is a song recorded by Mexican pop group RBD, released as the second single from the band's second studio album Nuestro Amor, on 18 November 2005. The song went number 1 in Mexico in December. It served as the second intro to the Mexican telenovela Rebelde in its second season.

== Background and release ==
"Aún Hay Algo" was released alongside its parent album Nuestro Amor, in September 2005, and later as the record's second single on 18 November. It was used as the second theme song for the telenovela Rebelde, where the group originated from. As part of Nosso Amor Rebelde, the Brazilian version of the album released in 2006, the band recorded a Portuguese version of the song, titled "Venha de Novo O Amor" (Spa. "Vendrá de Nuevo El Amor"; Eng. "Love Will Return"), which was released as the second single in Brazil on 23 June. Later, Brazil would have the acoustic version of "Aún Hay Algo", taken from the band's second live album, Live in Hollywood, released as a single to promote the project in the country; the official single from Live in Hollywood everywhere else was "No Pares".

== Composition and lyrics ==
"Aún Hay Algo" is a latin pop and teen pop song that runs for three minutes and 34 seconds. It was written by Carlos Lara and Karen Sokoloff, with production from Pedro Damián. The song is structured in verse-pre-chorus-chorus form, with a bridge between the last two choruses. It is written in the key of E major with a tempo of 95 BPMs. Mexican singer-songwriter Lynda Thomas is heard during the pre-chorus and chorus, and also doing harmonies for Christopher during his solo and for Dulce during the bridge.

The first verse is sung by Dulce María and Alfonso; the former feels that "there's something growing" between her and her lover, while the latter says that they "have a past, that maybe won't happen to us again". On the pre-chorus, Anahí and Christian state that even though "there is a goodbye difficult to forget" there's "also a love that can do miracles". During the chorus, Anahí, Dulce, and Christian are hopeful that their respective ex-partners "think of [them]" and "maybe between the two, there's still some love". In the second verse, Maite believes that "there's old feelings" between her and her ex-lover, while Christopher acknowledges that they "have a story, that left us in the middle of loneliness". During the bridge, Dulce begs her ex-partner to "look at [her] well", as she's "dying, to find [him] within [her]", and asks him to listen to her, before claiming "I don't how how to live without you".

== Chart performance ==
The song debuted at number 36 on Billboard's Hot Latin Songs chart, as a 'Hot Shot Debut' in early March 2006. The song later peaked at number 24 in April 2006.

== Music video ==
The music video for "Aún Hay Algo" was directed by Pedro Damián, being his fourth time directing an RBD video. Even though it premiered in November 2005, it still enjoyed a remarkable success during the first 3 months of 2006.

The video is mainly about what every member of RBD does before performing in one of their concerts. It features the band experiencing surreal journeys through different parts of a theater. Lastly, the video shows footage of what an actual RBD concert looks like.

== Release history ==
Region	Date
Mexico	November 2005
United States	February 2006

== Track listing ==
- Digital download
1. "Aún Hay Algo" – 3:34
- Digital download / Portuguese version
1. "Venha De Novo O Amor" – 3:35

== Credits and personnel ==
- Alfonso Herrera – vocals
- Anahí – vocals
- Carlos Lara – songwriter, producer
- Christian Chávez – vocals
- Christopher von Uckermann – vocals
- Cláudio Rabello – song adaptation to Portuguese
- Dulce María – vocals
- Lynda Thomas – harmony, chorus vocals (uncredited)
- Maite Perroni – vocals
- Max di Carlo (Note: Originally credited as Karen Sokoloff) – songwriter, producer
- Pedro Damián – executive producer

== Awards ==
Year	Ceremony	Award	Result	Ref.
2006	Premios Juventud	La Más Pegajosa	Won	

== Charts ==
Chart (2005/2006)	Peak position
Bolivia (Notimex)	1
Mexico Spanish AC/POP (Monitor Latino)	10
US Hot Latin Songs (Billboard)	24
US Latin Pop Airplay (Billboard)	9
