= List of Top 100 songs for 2013 in Mexico =

This is a list of the General Top 100 songs of 2013 in Mexico according to Monitor Latino. Monitor Latino also issued separate year-end charts for Regional Mexican, Pop and Anglo songs.

№	Title	Artist(s)
1	"Ni que estuvieras tan buena"	Calibre 50
2	"Hoy tengo ganas de ti"	Alejandro Fernández ft. Christina Aguilera
3	"La doble cara"	Banda Carnaval
4	"El ruido de tus zapatos"	La Arrolladora Banda El Limón
5	"Verde más allá"	Jenny and the Mexicats
6	"Y te vas"	Banda Carnaval
7	"Si ya lo sabe Dios"	La Adictiva Banda San José de Mesillas
8	"Sin ver atrás"	Banda el Recodo
9	"Mi último deseo"	Banda Los Recoditos
10	"Aquí estoy"	Calibre 50
11	"Te amo (Para siempre)"	Intocable
12	"Feel This Moment"	Pitbull ft. Christina Aguilera
13	"Locked Out of Heaven"	Bruno Mars
14	"Muchas gracias"	La Adictiva Banda San José de Mesillas
15	"Con la cara en alto"	Reik
16	"Tres semanas"	Marco Antonio Solís
17	"Suerte"	Paty Cantú
18	"Get Lucky"	Daft Punk ft. Pharrell Williams
19	"Llorar"	Jesse y Joy ft. Mario Domm
20	"Mi razón de ser"	Banda MS
21	"No me vengas a decir"	La Arrolladora Banda El Limón
22	"Te voy a perder"	Leonel García ft. Ha*Ash
23	"La derrota"	Joan Sebastian
24	"Don't You Worry Child"	Swedish House Mafia
25	"Mi bello ángel"	Los Primos MX
26	"Blurred Lines"	Robin Thicke ft. Pharrell Williams & T.I.
27	"Just Give Me a Reason"	Pink ft. Nate Ruess
28	"Cuando te entregues a él"	Banda Los Recoditos
29	"Gracias"	La Número 1 Banda Jerez
30	"La Fory Fay"	Julión Álvarez y su Norteño Banda
31	"Borracho de amor"	Banda La Trakalosa de Monterrey
32	"Por favor, no cuelgues"	Alfredo Ríos "El Komander"
33	"A donde quiera que vaya"	Julión Álvarez y su Norteño Banda
34	"La original"	La Original Banda El Limón
35	"Te besé"	Leonel García ft. María José
36	"Diamonds"	Rihanna
37	"Scream and Shout"	Will.i.am ft. Britney Spears
38	"Mi primer amor"	Pesado
39	"Sin ti"	Sasha, Benny y Erik
40	"Contigo safo"	La Estructura
41	"Te veías mejor conmigo"	Espinoza Paz
42	"Puño de diamantes"	Duelo
43	"Prefiero ser su amante"	María José
44	"Sin combustible"	Aneeka
45	"Camino de rosas"	Alejandro Sanz
46	"Hecho a tu medida"	Rosendo Amparano
47	"Te perdiste mi amor"	Thalía ft. Prince Royce
48	"Mi marciana"	Alejandro Sanz
49	"Sólo el amor nos salvará"	Aleks Syntek ft. Malú
50	"Don't Stop the Party"	Pitbull
51	"Sin ti"	Samo
52	"Sin ti nada importaría"	Saúl El Jaguar
53	"Sweet Nothing"	Calvin Harris ft. Florence Welch
54	"Vas a llorar por mi"	Banda El Recodo
55	"Loco"	Enrique Iglesias ft. Romeo Santos
56	"Urge"	La Número 1 Banda Jerez
57	"Ya no sé quién soy"	América Sierra
58	"Un par de cerdos"	Banda La Trakalosa de Monterrey
59	"Fascinación"	Carlos Rivera
60	"Cuando estás de buenas"	Pesado
61	"Salucita de la buena"	Los Titanes de Durango
62	"Billete mata carita"	Los Titanes de Durango
63	"Ese soy yo"	El Bebeto
64	"Treasure"	Bruno Mars
65	"Así era ella"	Cristian Castro
66	"El Coco no"	Roberto Junior y su Bandeño
67	"Hermosa experiencia"	Banda MS
68	"El que sigue de mí"	Banda Los Sebastianes
69	"En la oscuridad"	Belinda
70	"Habítame siempre"	Thalía
71	"Destino o casualidad"	Andrés Cuervo
72	"Ya lo ves"	El Trono de México
73	"Rehabilitado"	Los Tucanes de Tijuana
74	"Vas a sufrir"	Banda Los Sebastianes
75	"Mi niña traviesa"	Luis Coronel
76	"Muchacho de campo"	Voz de Mando
77	"Me gustas mucho"	Código FN
78	"I Love It"	Icona Pop
79	"No te convengo"	Jorge Santa Cruz
80	"Bienvenida"	Horacio Palencia
81	"Manual"	Paty Cantú
82	"La noche"	Sandoval
83	"Gracias"	Moderatto
84	"Como soy"	Mane de la Parra
85	"No soy un pájaro"	Gloria Trevi
86	"10 AM"	Zoé
87	"Safe and Sound"	Capital Cities
88	"El antes y el después"	La Poderosa Banda San Juan
89	"Como fui"	Río Roma
90	"Cómo hemos cambiado"	Sasha, Benny y Erik
91	"Bailar contigo"	Carlos Vives
92	"Roar"	Katy Perry
93	"Wake Me Up"	Avicii
94	"Como un huracán"	Los Huracanes del Norte
95	"Te lo advertí"	Roberto Junior y su Bandeño
96	"Por educación"	Hermanos Vega Jr.
97	"A los cuatro vientos"	Rosendo Amparano
98	"Abusamos del alcohol"	Alfredo Ríos "El Komander"
99	"Simplemente amor"	Ana Victoria ft. Erik Rubín
100	"Tengo que olvidarme de ti"	Carla Mauri

== See also ==
- List of number-one songs of 2013 (Mexico)
- List of number-one albums of 2013 (Mexico)
