= List of number-one songs of 2013 (Mexico) =

This is a list of the Monitor Latino number-one songs of 2013. Chart rankings are based on airplay across radio stations in Mexico using the Radio Tracking Data, LLC in real time. Charts are ranked from Monday to Sunday.

== Chart history ==
Besides the General chart, Monitor Latino published "Pop", "Regional" and "Anglo" charts. Monitor Latino provides two lists for each of these charts: the "Audience" list ranks the songs according to the estimated number of people that listened to them on the radio during the week. The "Tocadas" (Spins) list ranks the songs according to the number of times they were played on the radio during the week.

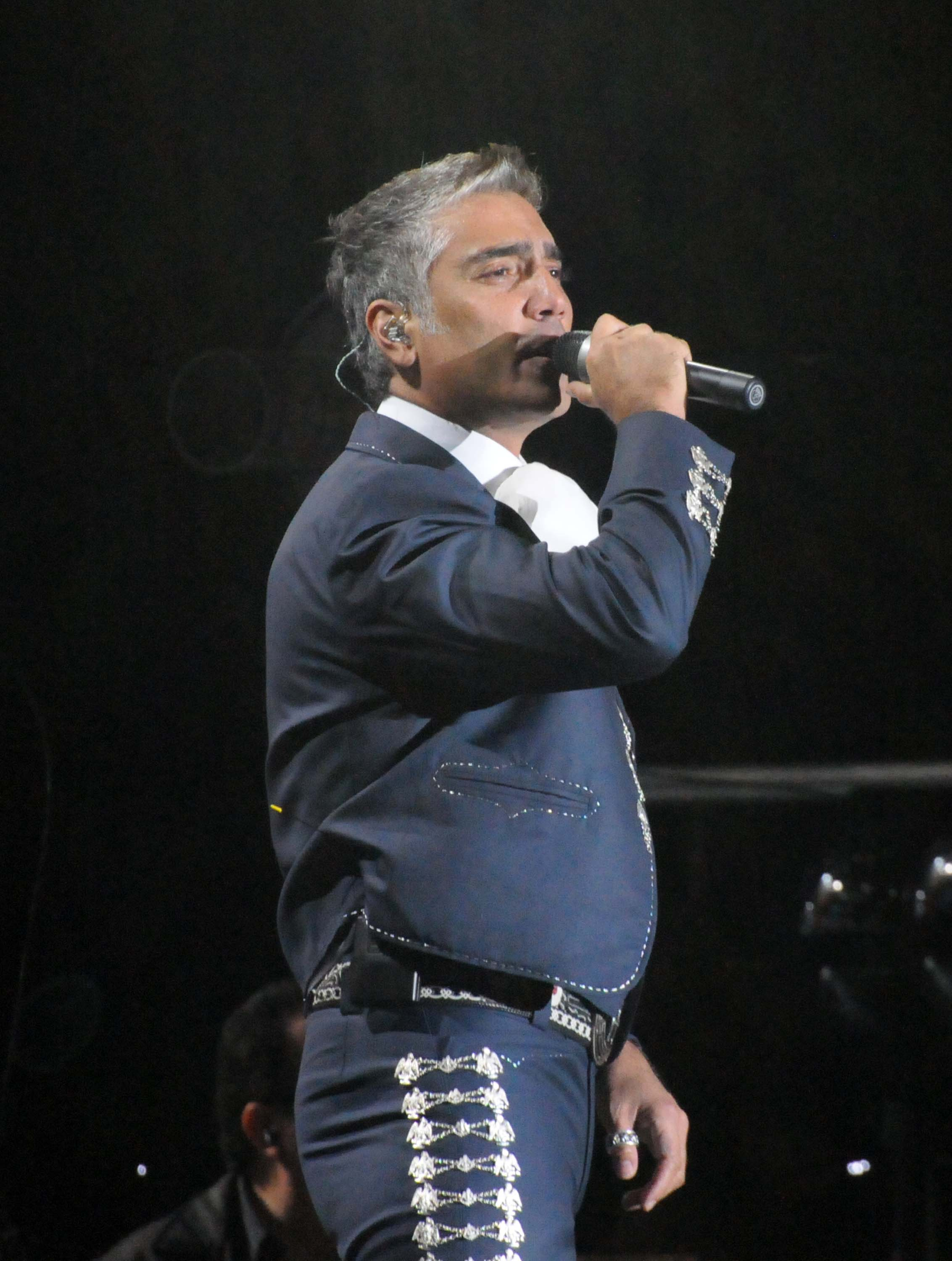
Alejandro Fernández (pictured) and Christina Aguilera's cover of "Hoy Tengo Ganas de Ti" spent nine weeks on top of the chart.

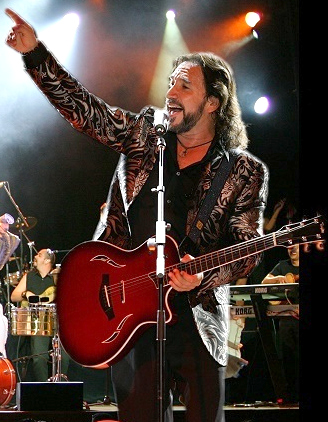
"Tres Semanas" by Mexican singer-songwriter Marco Antonio Solís (pictured) spent five weeks at number-one on the chart.

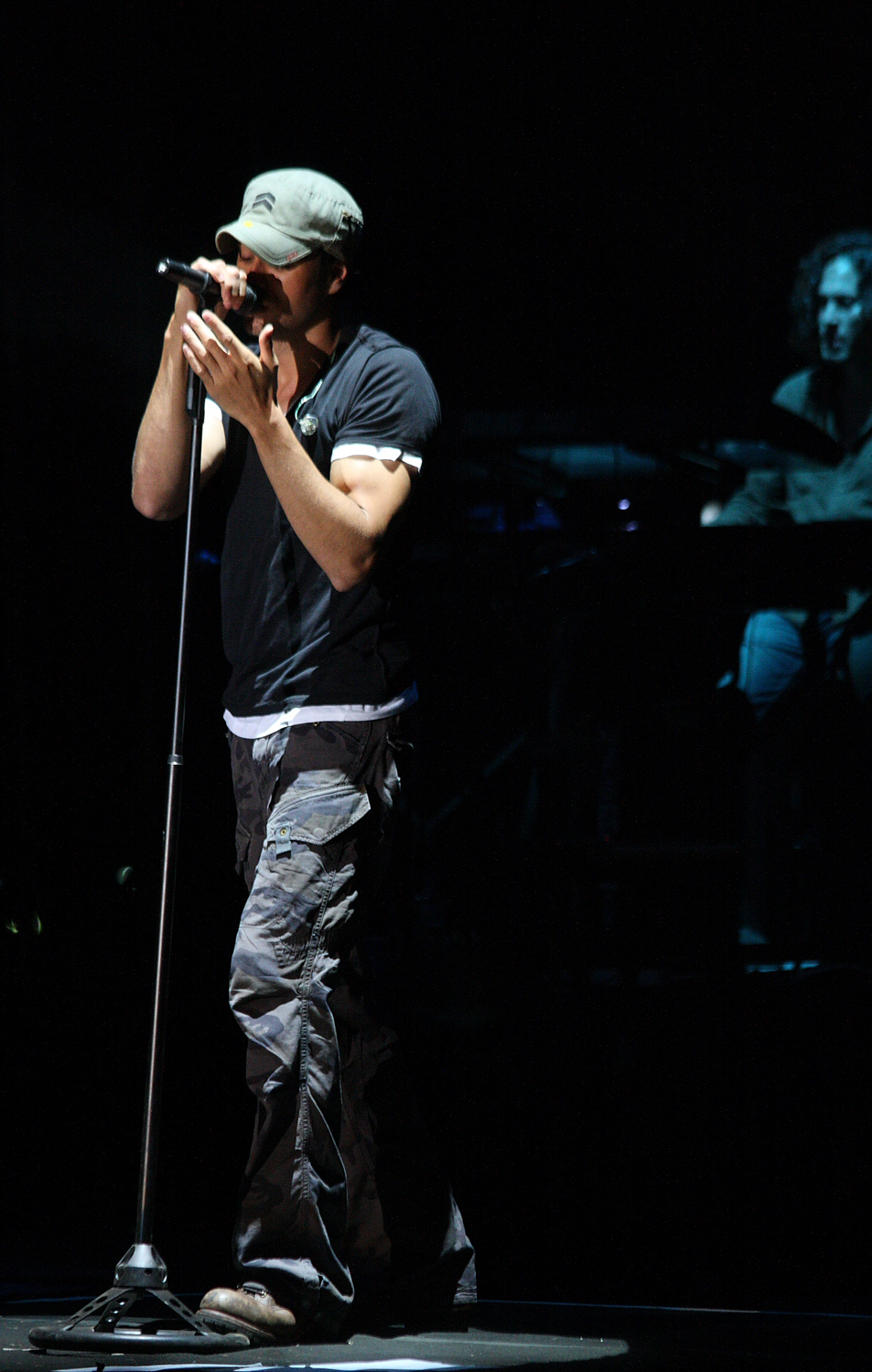
Spanish singer Enrique Iglesias (pictured) and American singer-songwriter Romeo Santos reached number-one on the chart with their song "Loco".

=== General ===
The yellow background indicates the best-performing song of 2013.

Issue date	Song (Audience)	Song (Spins)	Ref
January 6	"Sin ver atrás"^{Banda el Recodo}	"Te extraño"^{Andrés Cuervo}	
January 13	"Locked Out of Heaven"^{Bruno Mars}	"Te extraño"^{Andrés Cuervo}	
January 20	"Locked Out of Heaven"^{Bruno Mars}	"Te extraño"^{Andrés Cuervo}	
January 27	"Locked Out of Heaven"^{Bruno Mars}	"Y te vas"^{Banda Carnaval}	
February 3	"Locked Out of Heaven"^{Bruno Mars}	"Y te vas"^{Banda Carnaval}	
February 10	"Locked Out of Heaven"^{Bruno Mars}	"Y te vas"^{Banda Carnaval}	
February 17	"Locked Out of Heaven"^{Bruno Mars}	"Y te vas"^{Banda Carnaval}	
February 24	"Locked Out of Heaven"^{Bruno Mars}	"Y te vas"^{Banda Carnaval}	
March 3	"Locked Out of Heaven"^{Bruno Mars}	"Y te vas"^{Banda Carnaval}	
March 10	"Locked Out of Heaven"^{Bruno Mars}	"Te amo (para siempre)"^{Intocable}	
March 17	"Locked Out of Heaven"^{Bruno Mars}	"Te amo (para siempre)"^{Intocable}	
March 24	"Locked Out of Heaven"^{Bruno Mars}	"Aquí estoy"^{Calibre 50}	
March 31	"Locked Out of Heaven"^{Bruno Mars}	"Aquí estoy"^{Calibre 50}	
April 7	"Locked Out of Heaven"^{Bruno Mars}	"Aquí estoy"^{Calibre 50}	
April 14	"Feel This Moment"^{Pitbull ft. Christina Aguilera}	"Aquí estoy"^{Calibre 50}	
April 21	"Aquí estoy"^{Calibre 50}	"Muchas gracias"^{La Adictiva Banda San José de Mesillas}	
April 28	"Feel This Moment"^{Pitbull ft. Christina Aguilera}	"Aquí estoy"^{Calibre 50}	
May 5	"Con la cara en alto"^{Reik}	"Muchas gracias"^{La Adictiva Banda San José de Mesillas}	
May 12	"Sweet Nothing"^{Calvin Harris ft. Florence Welch}	"Aquí estoy"^{Calibre 50}	
May 19	"Get Lucky"^{Daft Punk ft. Pharrell Williams}	"La doble cara"^{Banda Carnaval}	
May 26	"Get Lucky"^{Daft Punk ft. Pharrell Williams}	"La doble cara"^{Banda Carnaval}	
June 2	"Get Lucky"^{Daft Punk ft. Pharrell Williams}	"Hoy tengo ganas de ti"^{Alejandro Fernández ft. Christina Aguilera}	
June 9	"Hoy Tengo Ganas de Ti"^{Alejandro Fernández ft. Christina Aguilera}	"Hoy tengo ganas de ti"^{Alejandro Fernández ft. Christina Aguilera}	
June 16	"Get Lucky"^{Daft Punk ft. Pharrell Williams}	"Hoy tengo ganas de ti"^{Alejandro Fernández ft. Christina Aguilera}	
June 23	"Get Lucky"^{Daft Punk ft. Pharrell Williams}	"Hoy tengo ganas de ti"^{Alejandro Fernández ft. Christina Aguilera}	
June 30	"Get Lucky"^{Daft Punk ft. Pharrell Williams}	"Hoy tengo ganas de ti"^{Alejandro Fernández ft. Christina Aguilera}	
July 7	"Get Lucky"^{Daft Punk ft. Pharrell Williams}	"Hoy tengo ganas de ti"^{Alejandro Fernández ft. Christina Aguilera}	
July 14	"El ruido de tus zapatos"^{La Arrolladora Banda El Limón}	"Hoy tengo ganas de ti"^{Alejandro Fernández ft. Christina Aguilera}	
July 21	"El ruido de tus zapatos"^{La Arrolladora Banda El Limón}	"Ni que estuvieras tan buena"^{Calibre 50}	
July 28	"El ruido de tus zapatos"^{La Arrolladora Banda El Limón}	"Ni que estuvieras tan buena"^{Calibre 50}	
August 4	"Get Lucky"^{Daft Punk ft. Pharrell Williams}	"Ni que estuvieras tan buena"^{Calibre 50}	
August 11	"El ruido de tus zapatos"^{La Arrolladora Banda El Limón}	"Ni que estuvieras tan buena"^{Calibre 50}	
August 18	"Blurred Lines"^{Robin Thicke ft. Pharrell Williams & T.I.}	"Ni que estuvieras tan buena"^{Calibre 50}	
August 25	"Blurred Lines"^{Robin Thicke ft. Pharrell Williams & T.I.}	"Ni que estuvieras tan buena"^{Calibre 50}	
September 1	"Propuesta indecente"^{Romeo Santos}	"Ni que estuvieras tan buena"^{Calibre 50}	
September 8	"Propuesta indecente"^{Romeo Santos}	"Hoy tengo ganas de ti"^{Alejandro Fernández ft. Christina Aguilera}	
September 15	"Propuesta indecente"^{Romeo Santos}	"Hoy tengo ganas de ti"^{Alejandro Fernández ft. Christina Aguilera}	
September 22	"Ni que estuvieras tan buena"^{Calibre 50}	"Hoy tengo ganas de ti"^{Alejandro Fernández ft. Christina Aguilera}	
September 29	"Roar"^{Katy Perry}	"Ni que estuvieras tan buena"^{Calibre 50}	
October 6	"Roar"^{Katy Perry}	"Tres semanas"^{Marco Antonio Solís}	
October 13	"Hermosa experiencia"^{Banda MS}	"Tres semanas"^{Marco Antonio Solís}	
October 20	"Roar"^{Katy Perry}	"Tres semanas"^{Marco Antonio Solís}	
October 27	"Roar"^{Katy Perry}	"Tres semanas"^{Marco Antonio Solís}	
November 3	"Tres semanas"^{Marco Antonio Solís}	"Tres semanas"^{Marco Antonio Solís}	
November 10	"Darte un beso"^{Prince Royce}	"Loco"^{Enrique Iglesias featuring Romeo Santos}	
November 17	"Darte un beso"^{Prince Royce}	"Loco"^{Enrique Iglesias featuring Romeo Santos}	
November 24	"Mi peor error"^{Alejandra Guzmán}	"Loco"^{Enrique Iglesias featuring Romeo Santos}	
December 1	"Mi peor error"^{Alejandra Guzmán}	"Loco"^{Enrique Iglesias featuring Romeo Santos}	
December 8	"Mi peor error"^{Alejandra Guzmán}	"Loco"^{Enrique Iglesias featuring Romeo Santos}	
December 15	"Mi peor error"^{Alejandra Guzmán}	"Mi peor error"^{Alejandra Guzmán}	
December 22	"Mi peor error"^{Alejandra Guzmán}	"El inmigrante"^{Calibre 50}	
December 29	"Mi peor error"^{Alejandra Guzmán}	"El inmigrante"^{Calibre 50}	

=== Pop ===
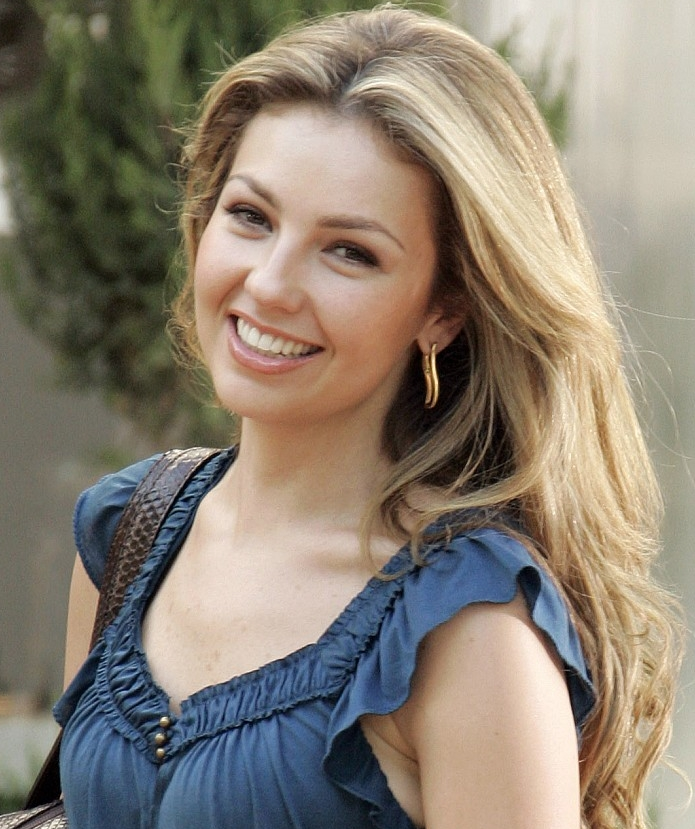
Mexican singer Thalía (pictured) had two Pop number-one songs in 2013.

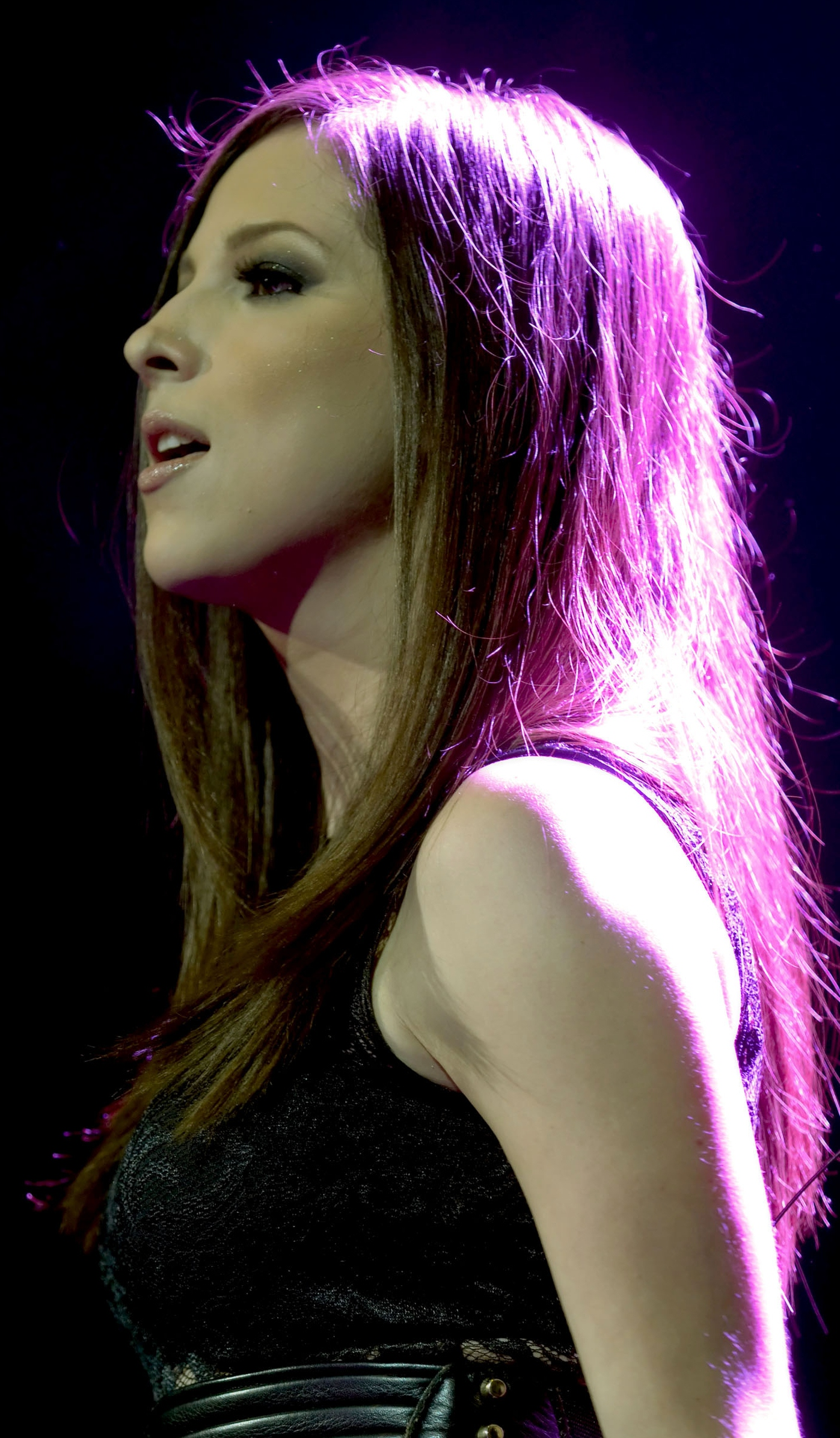
"Suerte" by Mexican singer Paty Cantú (pictured) topped the Pop "Spins" chart for 16 weeks.

Issue date	Song (Audience)	Song (Spins)	Ref
January 6	"Manías"^{Thalía}	"Manías"^{Thalía}	
January 13	"Manías"^{Thalía}	"Manías"^{Thalía}	
January 20	"Manías"^{Thalía}	"Manías"^{Thalía}	
January 27	"Manías"^{Thalía}	"Manías"^{Thalía}	
February 3	"Manías"^{Thalía}	"Manías"^{Thalía}	
February 10	"Llorar"^{Jesse y Joy ft. Mario Domm}	"Llorar"^{Jesse y Joy ft. Mario Domm}	
February 17	"Llorar"^{Jesse y Joy ft. Mario Domm}	"Llorar"^{Jesse y Joy ft. Mario Domm}	
February 24	"Llorar"^{Jesse y Joy ft. Mario Domm}	"Suerte"^{Paty Cantú}	
March 3	"Suerte"^{Paty Cantú}	"Suerte"^{Paty Cantú}	
March 10	"Suerte"^{Paty Cantú}	"Suerte"^{Paty Cantú}	
March 17	"Suerte"^{Paty Cantú}	"Suerte"^{Paty Cantú}	
March 24	"Suerte"^{Paty Cantú}	"Suerte"^{Paty Cantú}	
March 31	"Suerte"^{Paty Cantú}	"Suerte"^{Paty Cantú}	
April 7	"Suerte"^{Paty Cantú}	"Suerte"^{Paty Cantú}	
April 14	"Prefiero ser su amante"^{María José}	"Suerte"^{Paty Cantú}	
April 21	"Prefiero ser su amante"^{María José}	"Suerte"^{Paty Cantú}	
April 28	"Prefiero ser su amante"^{María José}	"Suerte"^{Paty Cantú}	
May 5	"Prefiero ser su amante"^{María José}	"Suerte"^{Paty Cantú}	
May 12	"Prefiero ser su amante"^{María José}	"Suerte"^{Paty Cantú}	
May 19	"Prefiero ser su amante"^{María José}	"Suerte"^{Paty Cantú}	
May 26	"Prefiero ser su amante"^{María José}	"Suerte"^{Paty Cantú}	
June 2	"Prefiero ser su amante"^{María José}	"Suerte"^{Paty Cantú}	
June 9	"Prefiero ser su amante"^{María José}	"Suerte"^{Paty Cantú}	
June 16	"Te perdiste mi amor"^{Thalía ft. Prince Royce}	"Te perdiste mi amor"^{Thalía ft. Prince Royce}	
June 23	"Te perdiste mi amor"^{Thalía ft. Prince Royce}	"Te perdiste mi amor"^{Thalía ft. Prince Royce}	
June 30	"Te perdiste mi amor"^{Thalía ft. Prince Royce}	"Te perdiste mi amor"^{Thalía ft. Prince Royce}	
July 7	"Te perdiste mi amor"^{Thalía ft. Prince Royce}	"Te perdiste mi amor"^{Thalía ft. Prince Royce}	
July 14	"Te perdiste mi amor"^{Thalía ft. Prince Royce}	"Te perdiste mi amor"^{Thalía ft. Prince Royce}	
July 21	"Te perdiste mi amor"^{Thalía ft. Prince Royce}	"Te perdiste mi amor"^{Thalía ft. Prince Royce}	
July 28	"Te perdiste mi amor"^{Thalía ft. Prince Royce}	"Te perdiste mi amor"^{Thalía ft. Prince Royce}	
August 4	"Te perdiste mi amor"^{Thalía ft. Prince Royce}	"Te perdiste mi amor"^{Thalía ft. Prince Royce}	
August 11	"Te perdiste mi amor"^{Thalía ft. Prince Royce}	"Te perdiste mi amor"^{Thalía ft. Prince Royce}	
August 18	"Sin ti"^{Samo}	"Te perdiste mi amor"^{Thalía ft. Prince Royce}	
August 25	"Sin ti"^{Samo}	"Ya no sé quién soy"^{América Sierra}	
September 1	"Sin ti"^{Samo}	"Ya no sé quién soy"^{América Sierra}	
September 8	"Te voy a perder"^{Leonel García ft. Ha*Ash}	"Hoy tengo ganas de ti"^{Alejandro Fernández ft. Christina Aguilera}	
September 15	"Es mejor así"^{Cristian Castro ft. Reik}	"Es mejor así"^{Cristian Castro ft. Reik}	
September 22	"Es mejor así"^{Cristian Castro ft. Reik}	"Es mejor así"^{Cristian Castro ft. Reik}	
September 29	"Es mejor así"^{Cristian Castro ft. Reik}	"Es mejor así"^{Cristian Castro ft. Reik}	
October 6	"Es mejor así"^{Cristian Castro ft. Reik}	"Es mejor así"^{Cristian Castro ft. Reik}	
October 13	"Es mejor así"^{Cristian Castro ft. Reik}	"Es mejor así"^{Cristian Castro ft. Reik}	
October 20	"Es mejor así"^{Cristian Castro ft. Reik}	"Es mejor así"^{Cristian Castro ft. Reik}	
October 27	"Es mejor así"^{Cristian Castro ft. Reik}	"Es mejor así"^{Cristian Castro ft. Reik}	
November 3	"Es mejor así"^{Cristian Castro ft. Reik}	"Es mejor así"^{Cristian Castro ft. Reik}	
November 10	"Es mejor así"^{Cristian Castro ft. Reik}	"Es mejor así"^{Cristian Castro ft. Reik}	
November 17	"Mi peor error"^{Alejandra Guzmán}	"Mi peor error"^{Alejandra Guzmán}	
November 24	"Mi peor error"^{Alejandra Guzmán}	"Mi peor error"^{Alejandra Guzmán}	
December 1	"Mi peor error"^{Alejandra Guzmán}	"Mi peor error"^{Alejandra Guzmán}	
December 8	"Mi peor error"^{Alejandra Guzmán}	"Mi peor error"^{Alejandra Guzmán}	
December 15	"Mi peor error"^{Alejandra Guzmán}	"Mi peor error"^{Alejandra Guzmán}	
December 22	"Mi peor error"^{Alejandra Guzmán}	"Mi peor error"^{Alejandra Guzmán}	
December 29	"Mi peor error"^{Alejandra Guzmán}	"Mi peor error"^{Alejandra Guzmán}	

=== Regional ===
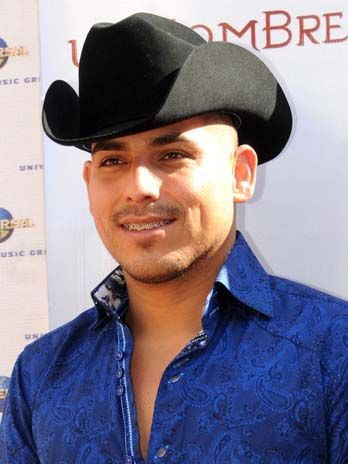
"Te veías mejor conmigo" by singer-songwriter Espinoza Paz (pictured) topped the Regional "Spins" chart for 17 weeks.

Issue date	Song (Audience)	Song (Spins)	Ref
January 6	"Sin ver atrás"^{Banda el Recodo}	"Aguaje activado"^{Calibre 50}	
January 13	"Sin ver atrás"^{Banda el Recodo}	"Y te vas"^{Banda Carnaval}	
January 20	"Sin ver atrás"^{Banda el Recodo}	"Y te vas"^{Banda Carnaval}	
January 27	"El Coco no"^{Roberto Junior y su Bandeño}	"Y te vas"^{Banda Carnaval}	
February 3	"El Coco no"^{Roberto Junior y su Bandeño}	"Y te vas"^{Banda Carnaval}	
February 10	"El Coco no"^{Roberto Junior y su Bandeño}	"Y te vas"^{Banda Carnaval}	
February 17	"Hecho a tu medida"^{Rosendo Amparano}	"Y te vas"^{Banda Carnaval}	
February 24	"Hecho a tu medida"^{Rosendo Amparano}	"Y te vas"^{Banda Carnaval}	
March 3	"Hecho a tu medida"^{Rosendo Amparano}	"Y te vas"^{Banda Carnaval}	
March 10	"Hecho a tu medida"^{Rosendo Amparano}	"Aquí estoy"^{Calibre 50}	
March 17	"Y te vas"^{Banda Carnaval}	"Aquí estoy"^{Calibre 50}	
March 24	"Y te vas"^{Banda Carnaval}	"Aquí estoy"^{Calibre 50}	
March 31	"Y te vas"^{Banda Carnaval}	"Aquí estoy"^{Calibre 50}	
April 7	"Muchas gracias"^{La Adictiva Banda San José de Mesillas}	"Aquí estoy"^{Calibre 50}	
April 14	"Muchas gracias"^{La Adictiva Banda San José de Mesillas}	"Aquí estoy"^{Calibre 50}	
April 21	"Muchas gracias"^{La Adictiva Banda San José de Mesillas}	"Aquí estoy"^{Calibre 50}	
April 28	"Aquí estoy"^{Calibre 50}	"Aquí estoy"^{Calibre 50}	
May 5	"Aquí estoy"^{Calibre 50}	"Muchas gracias"^{La Adictiva Banda San José de Mesillas}	
May 12	"Aquí estoy"^{Calibre 50}	"Aquí estoy"^{Calibre 50}	
May 19	"La doble cara"^{Banda Carnaval}	"La doble cara"^{Banda Carnaval}	
May 26	"Mi razón de ser"^{Banda MS}	"La doble cara"^{Banda Carnaval}	
June 2	"Ni que estuvieras tan buena"^{Calibre 50}	"La doble cara"^{Banda Carnaval}	
June 9	"El ruido de tus zapatos"^{La Arrolladora Banda El Limón}	"La doble cara"^{Banda Carnaval}	
June 16	"El ruido de tus zapatos"^{La Arrolladora Banda El Limón}	"Ni que estuvieras tan buena"^{Calibre 50}	
June 23	"El ruido de tus zapatos"^{La Arrolladora Banda El Limón}	"La derrota"^{Joan Sebastian}	
June 30	"El ruido de tus zapatos"^{La Arrolladora Banda El Limón}	"Ni que estuvieras tan buena"^{Calibre 50}	
July 7	"El ruido de tus zapatos"^{La Arrolladora Banda El Limón}	"Ni que estuvieras tan buena"^{Calibre 50}	
July 14	"El ruido de tus zapatos"^{La Arrolladora Banda El Limón}	"Ni que estuvieras tan buena"^{Calibre 50}	
July 21	"Te veías mejor conmigo"^{Espinoza Paz}	"Te veías mejor conmigo"^{Espinoza Paz}	
July 28	"Te veías mejor conmigo"^{Espinoza Paz}	"Te veías mejor conmigo"^{Espinoza Paz}	
August 4	"No te convengo"^{Jorge Santa Cruz}	"Te veías mejor conmigo"^{Espinoza Paz}	
August 11	"El ruido de tus zapatos"^{La Arrolladora Banda El Limón}	"Te veías mejor conmigo"^{Espinoza Paz}	
August 18	"Si ya lo sabe Dios"^{La Adictiva Banda San José de Mesillas}	"Te veías mejor conmigo"^{Espinoza Paz}	
August 25	"El ruido de tus zapatos"^{La Arrolladora Banda El Limón}	"Te veías mejor conmigo"^{Espinoza Paz}	
September 1	"Te veías mejor conmigo"^{Espinoza Paz}	"Te veías mejor conmigo"^{Espinoza Paz}	
September 8	"Te veías mejor conmigo"^{Espinoza Paz}	"Te veías mejor conmigo"^{Espinoza Paz}	
September 15	"Te veías mejor conmigo"^{Espinoza Paz}	"Te veías mejor conmigo"^{Espinoza Paz}	
September 22	"Te veías mejor conmigo"^{Espinoza Paz}	"Te veías mejor conmigo"^{Espinoza Paz}	
September 29	"Te veías mejor conmigo"^{Espinoza Paz}	"Te veías mejor conmigo"^{Espinoza Paz}	
October 6	"El ruido de tus zapatos"^{La Arrolladora Banda El Limón}	"Te veías mejor conmigo"^{Espinoza Paz}	
October 13	"Hermosa experiencia"^{Banda MS}	"Te veías mejor conmigo"^{Espinoza Paz}	
October 20	"Te veías mejor conmigo"^{Espinoza Paz}	"Te veías mejor conmigo"^{Espinoza Paz}	
October 27	"Te veías mejor conmigo"^{Espinoza Paz}	"Te veías mejor conmigo"^{Espinoza Paz}	
November 3	"Te veías mejor conmigo"^{Espinoza Paz}	"Te veías mejor conmigo"^{Espinoza Paz}	
November 10	"A los cuatro vientos"^{La Arrolladora Banda El Limón}	"Te veías mejor conmigo"^{Espinoza Paz}	
November 17	"A los cuatro vientos"^{La Arrolladora Banda El Limón}	"El inmigrante"^{Calibre 50}	
November 24	"Tres semanas"^{Marco Antonio Solís}	"El inmigrante"^{Calibre 50}	
December 1	"El inmigrante"^{Calibre 50}	"El inmigrante"^{Calibre 50}	
December 8	"El inmigrante"^{Calibre 50}	"El inmigrante"^{Calibre 50}	
December 15	"Hermosa experiencia"^{Banda MS}	"El inmigrante"^{Calibre 50}	
December 22	"Hermosa experiencia"^{Banda MS}	"El inmigrante"^{Calibre 50}	
December 29	"Hermosa experiencia"^{Banda MS}	"El inmigrante"^{Calibre 50}	

=== English ===
Issue date	Song (Audience)	Song (Spins)	Ref
January 6	"Gangnam Style"^{Psy}	"Diamonds"^{Rihanna}	
January 13	"Locked Out of Heaven"^{Bruno Mars}	"Diamonds"^{Rihanna}	
January 20	"Locked Out of Heaven"^{Bruno Mars}	"Locked Out of Heaven"^{Bruno Mars}	
January 27	"Locked Out of Heaven"^{Bruno Mars}	"Diamonds"^{Rihanna}	
February 3	"Locked Out of Heaven"^{Bruno Mars}	"Locked Out of Heaven"^{Bruno Mars}	
February 10	"Locked Out of Heaven"^{Bruno Mars}	"Locked Out of Heaven"^{Bruno Mars}	
February 17	"Locked Out of Heaven"^{Bruno Mars}	"Locked Out of Heaven"^{Bruno Mars}	
February 24	"Locked Out of Heaven"^{Bruno Mars}	"Locked Out of Heaven"^{Bruno Mars}	
March 3	"Locked Out of Heaven"^{Bruno Mars}	"Locked Out of Heaven"^{Bruno Mars}	
March 10	"Locked Out of Heaven"^{Bruno Mars}	"Locked Out of Heaven"^{Bruno Mars}	
March 17	"Locked Out of Heaven"^{Bruno Mars}	"Don't You Worry Child"^{Swedish House Mafia}	
March 24	"Locked Out of Heaven"^{Bruno Mars}	"Don't You Worry Child"^{Swedish House Mafia}	
March 31	"Locked Out of Heaven"^{Bruno Mars}	"Feel This Moment"^{Pitbull ft. Christina Aguilera}	
April 7	"Locked Out of Heaven"^{Bruno Mars}	"Feel This Moment"^{Pitbull ft. Christina Aguilera}	
April 14	"Feel This Moment"^{Pitbull ft. Christina Aguilera}	"Feel This Moment"^{Pitbull ft. Christina Aguilera}	
April 21	"Feel This Moment"^{Pitbull ft. Christina Aguilera}	"Feel This Moment"^{Pitbull ft. Christina Aguilera}	
April 28	"Feel This Moment"^{Pitbull ft. Christina Aguilera}	"Feel This Moment"^{Pitbull ft. Christina Aguilera}	
May 5	"Feel This Moment"^{Pitbull ft. Christina Aguilera}	"Feel This Moment"^{Pitbull ft. Christina Aguilera}	
May 12	"Sweet Nothing"^{Calvin Harris ft. Florence Welch}	"Feel This Moment"^{Pitbull ft. Christina Aguilera}	
May 19	"Get Lucky"^{Daft Punk ft. Pharrell Williams}	"Feel This Moment"^{Pitbull ft. Christina Aguilera}	
May 26	"Get Lucky"^{Daft Punk ft. Pharrell Williams}	"Get Lucky"^{Daft Punk ft. Pharrell Williams}	
June 2	"Get Lucky"^{Daft Punk ft. Pharrell Williams}	"Get Lucky"^{Daft Punk ft. Pharrell Williams}	
June 9	"Get Lucky"^{Daft Punk ft. Pharrell Williams}	"Get Lucky"^{Daft Punk ft. Pharrell Williams}	
June 16	"Get Lucky"^{Daft Punk ft. Pharrell Williams}	"Get Lucky"^{Daft Punk ft. Pharrell Williams}	
June 23	"Get Lucky"^{Daft Punk ft. Pharrell Williams}	"Get Lucky"^{Daft Punk ft. Pharrell Williams}	
June 30	"Get Lucky"^{Daft Punk ft. Pharrell Williams}	"Get Lucky"^{Daft Punk ft. Pharrell Williams}	
July 7	"Get Lucky"^{Daft Punk ft. Pharrell Williams}	"Get Lucky"^{Daft Punk ft. Pharrell Williams}	
July 14	"Get Lucky"^{Daft Punk ft. Pharrell Williams}	"Get Lucky"^{Daft Punk ft. Pharrell Williams}	
July 21	"Get Lucky"^{Daft Punk ft. Pharrell Williams}	"Get Lucky"^{Daft Punk ft. Pharrell Williams}	
July 28	"Get Lucky"^{Daft Punk ft. Pharrell Williams}	"Get Lucky"^{Daft Punk ft. Pharrell Williams}	
August 4	"Get Lucky"^{Daft Punk ft. Pharrell Williams}	"Get Lucky"^{Daft Punk ft. Pharrell Williams}	
August 11	"Blurred Lines"^{Robin Thicke ft. Pharrell Williams & T.I.}	"Blurred Lines"^{Robin Thicke ft. Pharrell Williams & T.I.}	
August 18	"Blurred Lines"^{Robin Thicke ft. Pharrell Williams & T.I.}	"Blurred Lines"^{Robin Thicke ft. Pharrell Williams & T.I.}	
August 25	"Blurred Lines"^{Robin Thicke ft. Pharrell Williams & T.I.}	"Blurred Lines"^{Robin Thicke ft. Pharrell Williams & T.I.}	
September 1	"Blurred Lines"^{Robin Thicke ft. Pharrell Williams & T.I.}	"Blurred Lines"^{Robin Thicke ft. Pharrell Williams & T.I.}	
September 8	"Blurred Lines"^{Robin Thicke ft. Pharrell Williams & T.I.}	"Blurred Lines"^{Robin Thicke ft. Pharrell Williams & T.I.}	
September 15	"Blurred Lines"^{Robin Thicke ft. Pharrell Williams & T.I.}	"Blurred Lines"^{Robin Thicke ft. Pharrell Williams & T.I.}	
September 22	"Treasure"^{Bruno Mars}	"Blurred Lines"^{Robin Thicke ft. Pharrell Williams & T.I.}	
September 29	"Roar"^{Katy Perry}	"Roar"^{Katy Perry}	
October 6	"Roar"^{Katy Perry}	"Roar"^{Katy Perry}	
October 13	"Roar"^{Katy Perry}	"Roar"^{Katy Perry}	
October 20	"Roar"^{Katy Perry}	"Roar"^{Katy Perry}	
October 27	"Roar"^{Katy Perry}	"Roar"^{Katy Perry}	
November 3	"Roar"^{Katy Perry}	"Roar"^{Katy Perry}	
November 10	"Roar"^{Katy Perry}	"Roar"^{Katy Perry}	
November 17	"Roar"^{Katy Perry}	"This Game Is Over"^{Alejandro Sanz ft. Emeli Sandé & Jamie Foxx}	
November 24	"Roar"^{Katy Perry}	"This Game Is Over"^{Alejandro Sanz ft. Emeli Sandé & Jamie Foxx}	
December 1	"Roar"^{Katy Perry}	"This Game Is Over"^{Alejandro Sanz ft. Emeli Sandé & Jamie Foxx}	
December 8	"Wrecking Ball"^{Miley Cyrus}	"This Game Is Over"^{Alejandro Sanz ft. Emeli Sandé & Jamie Foxx}	
December 15	"Story of My Life"^{One Direction}	"Story of My Life"^{One Direction}	
December 22	"Story of My Life"^{One Direction}	"Story of My Life"^{One Direction}	
December 29	"Story of My Life"^{One Direction}	"Story of My Life"^{One Direction}	

== See also ==
- List of Top 100 songs for 2013 in Mexico
- List of number-one albums of 2013 (Mexico)
