= Inevitable Tour =

2013–14 concert tour by Samo

- Tour by Samo
- Promotional poster for the tour
- Associated album: Inevitable
- Start date: September 13, 2013

Inevitable Tour is the first concert tour by Mexican singer Samo. The tour was launched in support of Samo's first studio album Inevitable (2013). The tour began on September 10, 2013, in the People's Theater of Mineral de la Reforma, Hidalgo, Mexico.

== Setlist ==
North America
1. Apertura
2. Inevitable
3. Peligro
4. Mientes
5. Todo Cambió
6. Doy un paso atrás
7. Tan sólo pido
8. Bésame
9. El que fue
10. Sólo por amor
11. ¿De qué me sirve la vida?
12. Yo quiero
13. Lejos de tu alma
14. Y no llueven lágrimas
15. Aléjate de mí
16. Coleccionista de canciones
17. Sin ti
18. Un nuevo sol
19. Encore: Inevitable

== Tour dates ==
Date	City	Country	Venue
North America
September 10, 2013	Mineral de la Reforma	Mexico	Teatro del Pueblo
September 25, 2013	Guanajuato	Mexico	Plazuela de San Roque
October 2, 2013	Saltillo	Mexico	Parque las Maravillas
October 3, 2013^{[1]}	Hermosillo	Mexico	EXPOFORUM
October 24, 2013	New York City	United States	Stage 48
October 25, 2013^{[2]}	Puerto Rico	Puerto Rico	José Miguel Agrelot Coliseum
October 30, 2013	Jalisco	Mexico	Auditorio "Benito Juárez"
November 8, 2013	Toluca	Mexico	Municipio de Metepec
November 13, 2013	Mexico City	Mexico	Voilá Antara
November 15, 2013^{[3]}	Tolum	Mexico	Hotel Zenserenity
November 19, 2013	Torreón	Mexico	Parque de Beisbol Revolución
November 20, 2013^{[4]}	Mérida	Mexico	Jardín Carta Clara
January 3, 2014	Acapulco	Mexico	Teatro María Bonita

Music festivals and other miscellaneous performances
^{1} This concert is a part of Festival de Las Estrellas de Amor.
^{2} This concert is a part of Noche de Estrellas Fidelity.
^{3} This concert is a part of Fashion Tolum 2013.
^{4} This concert is a part of Evento 40.
