= Samo (singer) =

Mexican singer and songwriter (born 1975)

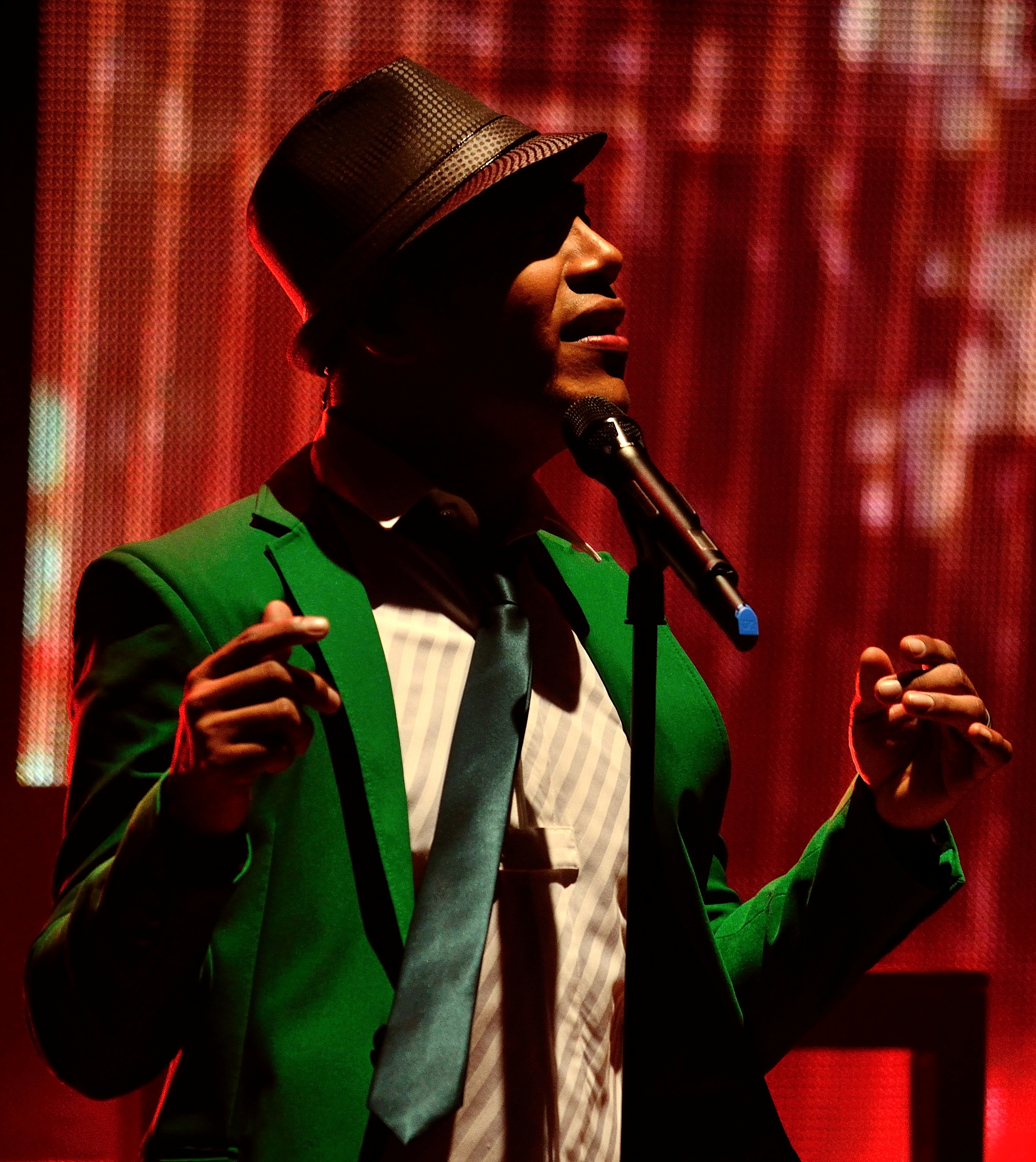
- Samo performing in 2013

Background information
- Born: Samuel Parra Cruz; December 2, 1975 (age 50)
- Origin: Veracruz, Mexico
- Genres: Latin; soul; pop
- Occupations: Singer; songwriter
- Instrument: Vocals
- Years active: 1993–present
- Label: Sony Latin
- Member of: Camila
- Website: www.samooficial.com

Samuel Parra Cruz (born December 2, 1975), known professionally as Samo, is a Mexican pop singer and songwriter, born and raised in Veracruz. Samo rose to fame in the late 2000s as a member of the band Camila.

== Life and career ==
=== 1975–2005: Early life and career beginnings ===
Samo was born in Veracruz. Since age five, Samo was part of the choir of the Christian Church directed by his father in Boca del Río. In 1993, at 18 years old, he was part of a group called Salmo 40 which toured the United States and some Mexican cities. The group did not get the results they expected and in 1995, Samo decided to try his luck in the talent competition "Junior Securities" in Mexico City, being among the first places in the final.

In 1998, he was chosen to sing in the choir section Alejandra Guzman which participated in the tour of the discs titled, I and Lipstick.

=== 2005–2009: Camila, Todo Cambió and compositions ===
During the recording of En la Luna by Reyli Barba, Samo met Mario Domm. Domm invited him to join forces to create a new project. They began rehearsing with a piano and decided to add a guitarist to the newly created band. Pablo Hurtado, the first one to audition, was selected. The band was named Camila, meaning "close to god", as the "appropriate thanks to the granting of the group's collective dream." The band released in 2006 their début album entitled Todo Cambió, which sold one million copies worldwide and reached number-one in Mexico and the United States. The album yielded six singles, "Abrázame", "Coleccionista de Canciones", "Todo Cambió", "Sólo Para Ti", "Me Da Igual" and "Yo Quiero". Camila received a Latin Grammy Award nomination for Song of the Year in 2008 for the single "Todo Cambió".

In 2009, Samo composed the theme "Sin Querer", which was coauthored with Rafael López Arellano, and it was included in the album Soy from Puerto Rican singer Ednita Nazario. In the same year, he composed, along with Alfredo León Canedo and Carolina Rosas, the theme "No Puedo" included on the album Lo que soy from Mexican singer Diego Schoening.

=== 2010-2012: Dejarte de Amar and collaborations ===
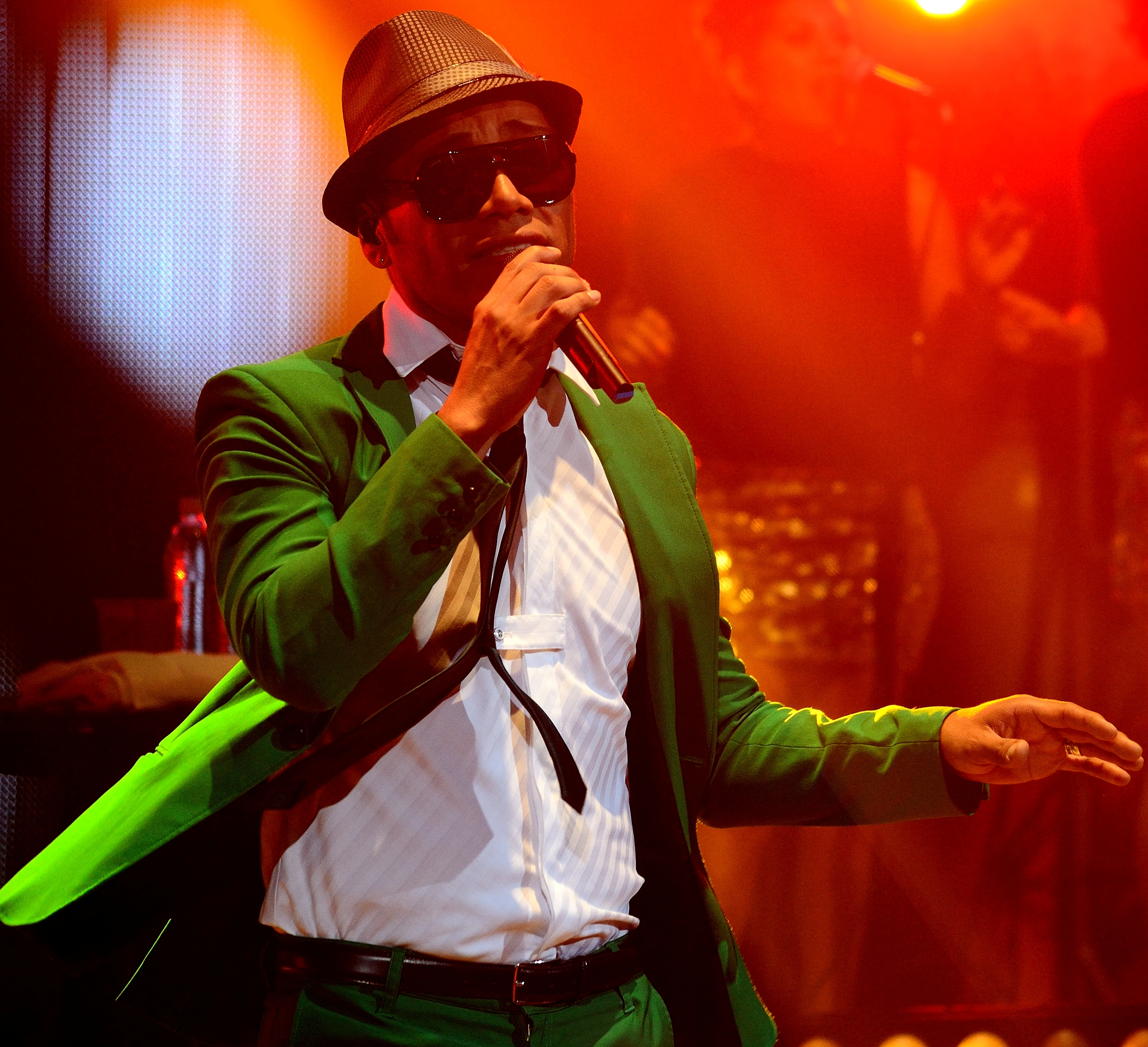
Samo work with artists such as Thalía, Reik and Alejandra Guzman.

In 2010, Camila released their second album Dejarte de Amar. Dejarte de Amar debuted at the top of the charts in Mexico and the United States. In Mexico the album spent eight weeks at number-one and 70 non-consecutive weeks within the top ten. At the Latin Grammy Awards of 2010, the band earned three awards: Record of the Year and Song of the Year for the song "Mientes" and Best Pop Vocal Album by a Group.

In 2010, Samo composed the songs "Quiero volar" and "Nunca entendí", included in the debut album Almas Transparentes of former RBD member Christian Chávez. That same year he coauthored with Rafael Ruiz Esparza the theme "Arrepentida", first single from the album Inusual from Mexican singer Yuri and the theme "Con Las Manos Atadas", which was chosen as the theme song of the series Mujeres Asesinas of the Mexican producer Pedro Torres. In September 2010, he composed the theme "Llegaste a Mí" from the album Tráfico de Sentimientos of the singer Camilo Echeverri. In October 2010, he composed with Olga Tañon the songs "Ni una Lágrima Más", "Sola" and "Caso Perdido", included in the album Ni una Lágrima Más from the Puerto Rican singer, published in 2011. That same year he recorded a duet on the theme "Ni una Lágrima Más" with Olga. In late 2010, he composed with Manuel Moreno and Germán Montero the theme "Tú mi Mundo Yo un Recuerdo" included on the third disc of the singer. In November 2010, he was presented at the "Amigos por Veracruz", playing a theme with singer Yuri.

In 2011, he composed the theme "Libertad" performed by Anahí and Christian Chávez, and the theme "Purple Rain" included in the live album Esencial from the Mexican singer. In March 2012, he interpreted the theme "Tan Sólo Piedo", composed by him and used in the Mexican telenovela Amor Bravío. On March 30, 2012, it launches Enamorada de Ti with the theme "Amor Prohibido" performed by Samo and Selena. The theme ranked 8th in the Latin Pop Songs and 23rd on the Hot Latin Songs chart on Billboard. Samo interpreted the theme as a tribute to the singer, for the first time live at the 2012 Latin Billboard Music Awards.

In 2012, he interpreted the theme "Sólo por amor", theme song of the American soap opera Relaciones Peligrosas. On November 9, 2012, Mexican singer Thalía launched the album "Habítame Siempre" including the theme "Con los años que me quedan" which features Samo with Leonel García and Jesús Navarro of Reik.

=== 2013-present: Inevitable and collaborations ===
On April 2, 2013, launched "Reik, En Vivo Desde El Auditorio Nacional" with the theme "¿De qué me sirve la vida?" performed by the group Reik and Samo.

On May 23, 2013, Samo confirmed his departure from the band Camila and launching his solo career. On May 28, 2013 launched the first single "Sin Ti" composed by him. The theme placed #30 Latin Pop Songs, and at #48 in the Latin Songs in Billboard.

On July 16, 2013, Samo launched his debut album Inevitable. The album debuted at #3 on the chart of AMPROFON in Mexico. In the U.S., the album was ranked 9th on the Latin Pop Albums chart of Billboard. In August 2013 launched the album "En El Camino" of the Mexican band Pandora which includes the song, "¿De Qué Me Sirve La Vida?" composed by Samo and features a duet with him.

In 2021, it was reported that Samo will appear in Sie7e, a production opening in Mexico City that depicts the seven deadly sins.

== Discography ==
=== As a solo artist ===
Year	Album details	Singles
2013	Inevitable: Released: July 16, 2013; Label: Sony Music; Formats: CD, download, LP	1. "Sin Ti"; 2. "Inevitable"; 3. "Doy Un Paso Atrás"

=== Collaborations ===
- 2010: "Ni una lágrima más" (with Olga Tañon)
- 2012: "Amor Prohibido" (with Selena)
- 2012: "Con Los Años Que Me Quedan" (with Thalía, Leonel García and Jesús Navarro from Reik)
- 2013: "¿De Qué Me Sirve La Vida?" (with Reik)
- 2013: "¿De Qué Me Sirve La Vida?" (with Pandora)
- 2013: "Quiero Amarte" (with Reik, Noel Schajris y Armando Manzanero)
- 2013: "Mi Vida Sin Ti" (with La Oreja de Van Gogh)

=== With Camila ===
- Todo Cambió (2006)
- Dejarte de Amar (2010)

== Tours ==
- Inevitable Tour (2013)
