= Esencial (Christian Chávez album) =

Live album by Christian Chávez
- Released: August 14, 2012
- Recorded: 2012
- Genre: Latin pop

Christian Chávez chronology
| Esencial - EP (2012) | Esencial (2012) | Conectado (2018) |

Singles from Esencial
- 1. "Sacrilegio" Released: May 22, 2012

Esencial is the second album, and first live album, by the Mexican singer Christian Chávez. It was released on August 14, 2012, and was recorded during a live performance at Carioca Club in São Paulo, Brazil on January 17, 2012. A DVD version of the concert was scheduled to be released in late 2012. The album was produced and arranged by Tiago D'Errico.

Esencial features remakes of several of Chávez's more famous songs, including "Y Si No Ves" and "Tu Amor", which was written by Diane Warren and released when Chávez was a part of the Latin pop group RBD. His single "¿En Donde Estas?" has been remade into a duet with Indonesian singer and actress Agnes Monica. The song is sung in three languages: English, Spanish, and Indonesian.

"Sacrilegio", written by Chavez and Claudia Brant, was released as an EP on May 22, 2012, and is included as a track on Esencial. Another track is "No Me Olvides", written for Chávez by his friend, singer/songwriter Juan Gabriel.

== Track listing ==
| No. | Title | Writer(s) | Length |
|---|---|---|---|
| 1. | "Eterna Soledad" | Marciano Cantero, Felipe Staiti | 4:30 |
| 2. | "Tu Amor" | Diane Warren | 3:58 |
| 3. | "Como Es Grande Mi Amor Por Ti (feat. Cine)" | Roberto Carlos, Mc Cluskey, Buddy Ma | 2:54 |
| 4. | "Y Si No Ves" | Mau Lopez de Arriaga, Eduardo Murguia Pedraza | 3:47 |
| 5. | "Tatuajes" | Jose Manuel Figueroa, Joan Sebastian | 3:13 |
| 6. | "Por Encuando" | Renato Russo | 2:48 |
| 7. | "No Me Olvides" | Juan Gabriel | 3:26 |
| 8. | "Sacrilégio" | Christian Chávez, Claudia Brant | 4:14 |
| 9. | "Pedazos" | Christian Chávez | 3:53 |
| 10. | "En Donde Estas (feat. Agnes Monica)" | Mau Lopez de Arriaga | 3:58 |
| 11. | "Purple Rain" | Prince, Samuel Parra Cruz | 6:51 |
| 12. | "Libertad" | Christian Chávez, Samuel Parra Cruz, Sebastian J. | 4:22 |
