= Almas Transparentes =

Studio album by Christian Chávez
- Released: March 23, 2010
- Recorded: 2009–2010
- Genre: Latin pop
- Length: 35:45
- Label: EMI
- Producer: Loris Ceroni

Christian Chávez chronology
Almas Transparentes (2010)	Libertad - EP (2011)

Singles from Almas Transparentes
- 1. "¿En Dónde Estás?" Released: January 10, 2010; 2. "Aún Sin Ti" Released: February 23, 2010; 3. "Almas Transparentes" Released: March 9, 2010

Almas Transparentes is the debut studio album by Christian Chávez. It was released on March 23, 2010. The name of the album reflects a range of feelings that inspired this young talent.

"This album is dedicated to the relationship that had, at the end of RBD, and this decade, it was very difficult. It's been 10 years flying." Christian Chávez noted. The singer ventured to enter into the composition of some of his songs and said that "It was like the trigger and let go of the dirty water".

The album's first single "¿En Dónde Estás?" was released in January, 2010. According to the singer, the single's theme is about indifference. "The first song is a 'ballad', and I think everyone will like, the whole world," he said. Christian Chávez made the video shoot for the song "¿En Donde Estas?" For he chose a spot in the city of Chimalhuacan, State of Mexico. During the shooting, he spoke of the importance of demonstrating their musical work and stressed he did not want to be recognized for their sexual preferences, but for his talent.

== Track listing ==
No.	Title	Writer(s)	Length
1.	"Almas Transparentes"	Cesar Miranda	3:19
2.	"Aún Sin Ti"	Carlos Sánchez, Luis Sánchez, Victor Sánchez	4:13
3.	"¿En Dónde Estás?"	Mauricio Arriaga	3:47
4.	"Quiero Volar"	Christian Chávez, Samo	3:26
5.	"Baby"	Christian Chávez, Mats Valentin	3:09
6.	"Sígueme Y Te Seguiré"	Peter Kvint, Jonas Myrin	3:32
7.	"Y Si No Ves"	Mauricio Arriaga	3:44
8.	"Nunca Entendí"	Christian Chávez, Samo	3:10
9.	"Por Qué"	Max Calo, Alejandro Learn	3:24
10.	"Sexy Boy"	Chris Rodríguez, Eduardo Renta	4:01

== Personnel ==
- Iván Aguirre – photography
- Loris Ceroni – arranger, keyboards, programming, producer, mixing, recording
- Gigi Fazio – chorus
- Alvaro González – A&R
- Fernando Grediaga – A&R
- Mario Neri – arranger, keyboards, producer
- Mike Marsh – mastering
- Brad Myrock – guitar, arranger, producer
- Claudio Passavanti – arranger, keyboards, producer, pre-production
- Daniel C. Peralta – design
- Livio Perrotta – arranger, keyboards, producer, pre-production
- Ricky Rinaldi – pre-production
- Daniel Suarez – general coordination
- Pablo Vega – management

== Charts ==
Chart (2009–2010)	Peak position
Mexican Albums Chart	56
