= List of number-one albums of 2013 (Mexico) =

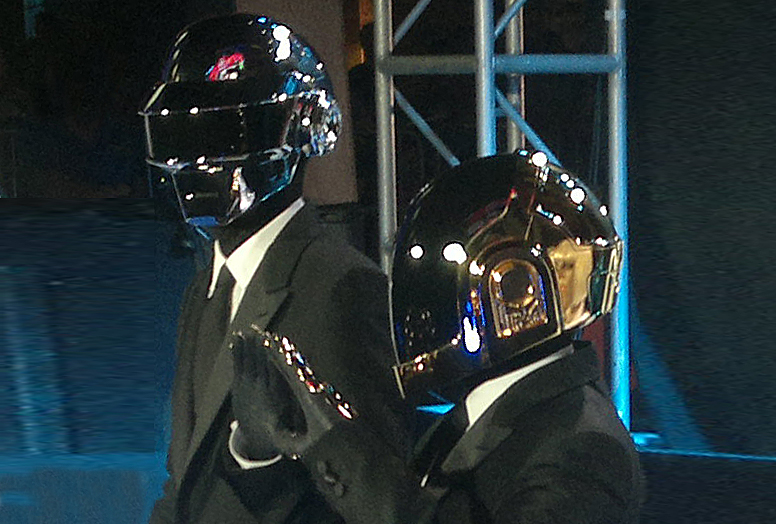
Random Access Memories by French electronic music duo Daft Punk was the international album with most weeks at number one.

Top 100 Mexico is a record chart published weekly by AMPROFON (Asociación Mexicana de Productores de Fonogramas y Videogramas), a non-profit organization composed by Mexican and multinational record companies. This association tracks record sales (physical and digital) in Mexico.

== Chart history ==
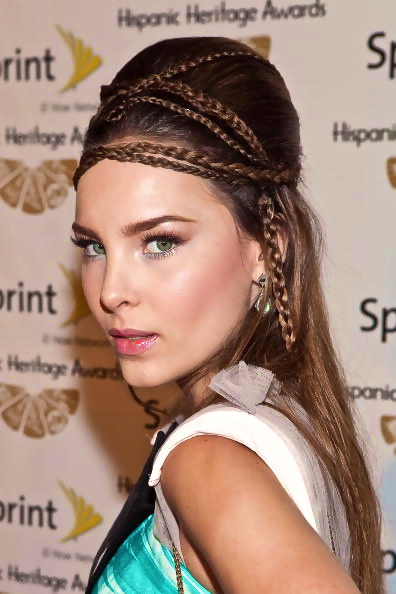
Belinda's album, Catarsis was her first studio album since debut in 2003 to reach the number one in Mexico.

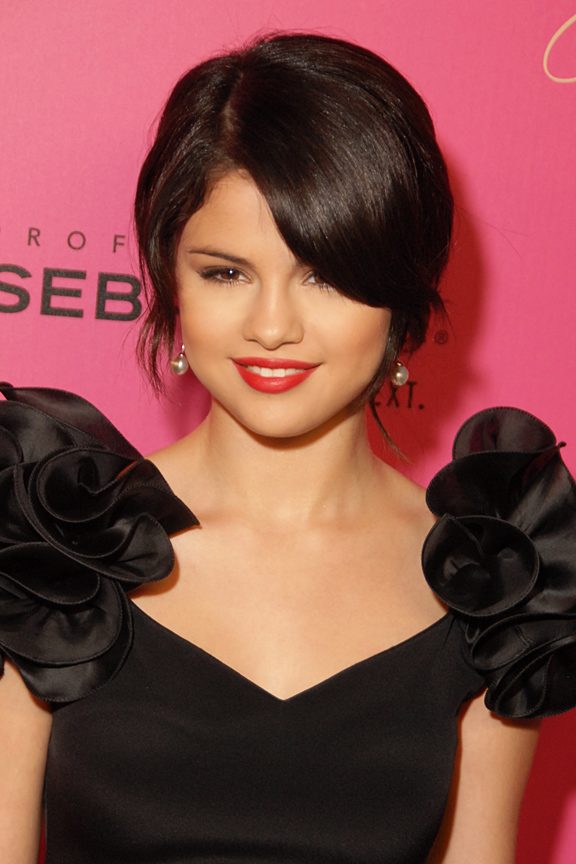
The debut album Stars Dance by Selena Gomez reached number one, selling 30,000 copies in 2013.

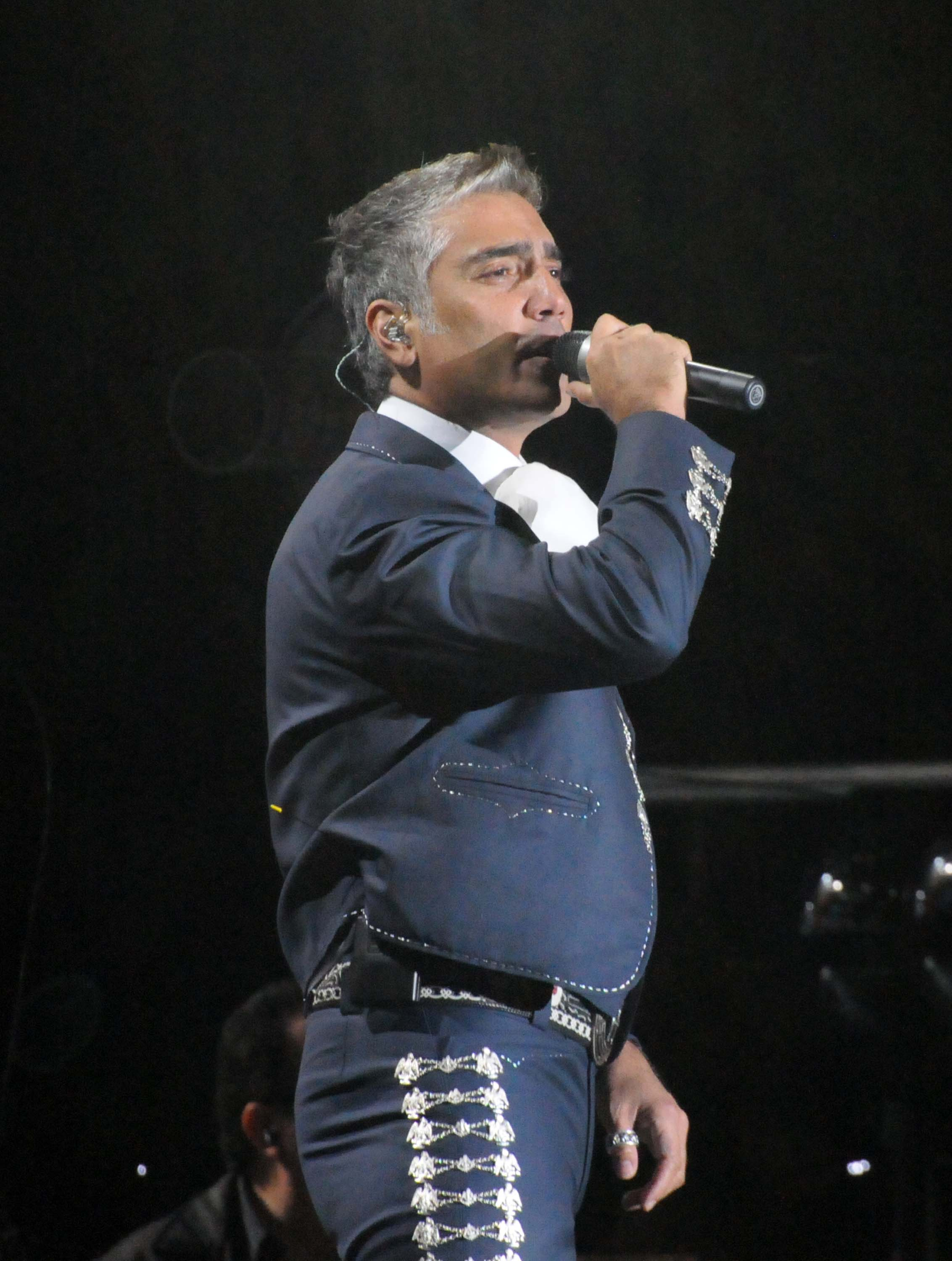
Confidencias by Alejandro Fernández debuted at No. 1 with platinum sales.

The yellow background indicates the best-performing album of 2013.

Chart date	Album	Artist	Reference
January 6	Take Me Home	One Direction	
January 13	Joyas Prestadas: Pop	Jenni Rivera	
January 20	Joyas Prestadas: Pop	Jenni Rivera	
January 27	Primera Fila: Sasha Benny Erik	Sasha, Benny y Erik	
February 3	Believe Acoustic	Justin Bieber	
February 10	Believe Acoustic	Justin Bieber	
February 17	Baladas Para Enamorados 2013	Various Artists	
February 24	Primera Fila: Sasha Benny Erik	Sasha, Benny y Erik	
March 3	Primera Fila: Sasha Benny Erik	Sasha, Benny y Erik	
March 10	Primera Fila: Sasha Benny Erik	Sasha, Benny y Erik	
March 17	Canto Por Ti	Manuel Mijares	
March 24	Canto Por Ti	Manuel Mijares	
March 31	Canto Por Ti	Manuel Mijares	
April 7	En Primera Fila - Día 1	Cristian Castro	
April 14	En Primera Fila - Día 1	Cristian Castro	
April 21	Canto Por Ti	Manuel Mijares	
April 28	To Be Loved	Michael Bublé	
May 5	Canto Por Ti	Manuel Mijares	
May 12	Mi Tributo al Festival II	Yuri	
May 19	Random Access Memories	Daft Punk	
May 26	Random Access Memories	Daft Punk	
June 2	Random Access Memories	Daft Punk	
June 9	Random Access Memories	Daft Punk	
June 16	24/Seven	Big Time Rush	
June 23	Random Access Memories	Daft Punk	
June 30	Random Access Memories	Daft Punk	
July 7	Catarsis	Belinda	
July 14	Random Access Memories	Daft Punk	
July 21	Cómo Te Voy a Olvidar	Los Ángeles Azules	
July 28	Stars Dance	Selena Gomez	
August 4	Sergio George Presents Salsa Giants (Live)	Sergio George	
August 11	Gracias Por Creer	La Arrolladora Banda El Limón	
August 18	Gracias Por Creer	La Arrolladora Banda El Limón	
August 25	Gracias Por Creer	La Arrolladora Banda El Limón	
September 1	Confidencias	Alejandro Fernández	
September 8	Confidencias	Alejandro Fernández	
September 15	Confidencias	Alejandro Fernández	
September 22	Confidencias	Alejandro Fernández	
September 29	Confidencias	Alejandro Fernández	
October 6	Confidencias	Alejandro Fernández	
October 13	Confidencias	Alejandro Fernández	
October 20	Confidencias	Alejandro Fernández	
October 27	Bangerz	Miley Cyrus	
November 3	Prográmaton	Zoé	
November 10	Palosanto	Enrique Bunbury	
November 17	ARTPOP	Lady Gaga	
November 24	ARTPOP	Lady Gaga	
December 1	Midnight Memories	One Direction	
December 8	Midnight Memories	One Direction	
December 15	Midnight Memories	One Direction	
December 22	Midnight Memories	One Direction	
December 29	Midnight Memories	One Direction	

== See also ==
- List of number-one songs of 2013 (Mexico)
