= Inevitable (album) =

Studio album by Samo
- Released: July 16, 2013
- Recorded: 2012
- Genre: Latin pop, pop
- Length: 49:02
- Label: Sony Music
- Producer: Rafa Vergara, Andrés Castro, Motiff and Edgar Barrera

Samo chronology
Dejarte de Amar (2010)	Inevitable (2013)

Singles from Inevitable
- 1. "Sin Ti" Released: May 28, 2013; 2. "Inevitable" Released: September 12, 2013; 3. "Doy Un Paso Atrás" Released: December 21, 2013

Inevitable (Eng.: Inevitably) is the title of a debut album released by Mexican pop music singer Samo, released on July 16, 2013 through Sony Music in Mexico and July 30, 2013 in United States.

== Track listing ==
Standard edition
No.	Title	Writer(s)	Length
1.	"Peligro"	Arbise "Motiff" Gonzalez, Samo	3:52
2.	"Sin Ti"	Edgar Barrera, Andrés Castro, Samo	4:27
3.	"Doy Un Paso Atrás"	Mike Hernandez, Chino Mejía, Manu Moreno, Samo	3:55
4.	"Inevitable"	Samo, Rafa Vergara	3:41
5.	"El Que Fue"	Samo, Rafa Vergara	4:25
6.	"Tan Sólo Pido"	Carlos Rosas, Samo	3:22
7.	"Un Nuevo Sol"	Eliacim Martínez, Samo	3:07
8.	"Tú Fuiste Quién"	Pablo Preciado, Samo	3:46
9.	"Lejos De Tu Alma"	Edgar Barrera, Andrés Castro, Samo	3:30
10.	"Quiero Escuchar Tu Voz"	Samo	3:23
11.	"Nada Alrededor"	Maria Bernal, Mauro Muñoz	3:59
12.	"Y No Lluevan Lágrimas"	Samo, Claudia Brant	4:14
13.	"Sólo Por Amor"	Samo, Roy Tavare	3:21

Standard edition - bonus track
No.	Title	Length
14.	"Tiempo para amar"	3:32

Standard edition - DVD bonus track
No.	Title	Length
1.	"Peligro" (Live version)	4:03
2.	"Sin Ti" (Live version)	4:38
3.	"Tan Sólo Pido" (Live version)	3:36
4.	"Tiempo Para Amar" (Live version)	3:36
5.	"Doy Un Paso Atrás" (Live version)	4:07
6.	"Inevitable" (Live version)	3:41
7.	"Sólo Por Amor" (Live version)	3:32
8.	"¿De Qué Me Sirve La Vida?" (Live version)	4:50
9.	"Samo Sony Sessions"	3:48

== Personnel ==
Credits for Inevitable:

- Samo – composer, coros, primary artist
- Pedro Alfonos – violin
- Rosa Alicia Cole Avendaño – viola
- J. Roberto Garrido Avila – graphic design
- Edgar Barrera – arreglos, composer, engineer, keyboards, string arrangements
- Maria Bernal – composer
- Claudia Brant – composer
- Alejandro Calles – label manager
- Freddy Cañedo – bass
- Gabriel Castañón – engineer
- Andrés Castro – arreglos, composer, engineer, guitar, keyboards, string arrangements
- Tom Coyne – mastering
- Jackie D'Silva – coros
- Gabriela Aldana Domenzain – violin
- Daniel Itzcoatl Uribe Domínguez – violin
- Vicky Echeverri – coros
- Irene Del Carmen Cabezas Fernández – violin
- Charlie Garcia – A&R
- Arbise "Motiff" Gonzalez – composer
- Laura Adriana Martínez González – cello
- Fabián Rangel Gutiérrez – violin
- Mike Hernandez – composer
- Zavaleta Hernández – viola
- Amanda Judith Contreras Jaramillo – violin
- Martha Jeamina – wardrobe coordinator
- Marie Claire Kobeh – label manager
- Marielos Labias – coros
- Guillermo Gutiérrez Leyva – A&R
- Konstantin Litvinenko – cello
- Johnny Lopera – photography
- Eduardo Carlos Juárez López – violin
- Cinthya Karina González Madrigal – violin
- Pablo Manresa – arreglos, engineer, piano, programming, string arrangements
- Victor Manuel – viola
- Eliacim Martínez – composer
- Patricia Amelia Luison Mata – cello
- Chino Mejía – composer
- Ana Margarita Hernández Mogollón – violin
- Peter Mokran – mezcla
- Xiuhnel Valdivia Morales – cello
- Manu Moreno - composer
- Motiff – arreglos, guitar, keyboards, percussion
- Mauro Muñoz – composer
- Orquesta Sinfónica Juvenil Del Estado De Veracruz – cuerda
- Lizete Ozuna – coros
- Shafik Palis – engineer
- William Paredes – trombone
- Sara Parra – coros
- David Peña – photography
- Kiolal Vélez Peralta – cello
- Luis Portillo – piano
- Pablo Preciado – composer
- Martin Sánchez Ramos – violin
- Ana Alicia Martínez Rivera – viola
- Valeria Roa Rizo – violin
- Alberto J. Rodríguez – assistant engineer
- Pablo Nicolás González Rodríguez – violin
- Alejandro Román – coordination executive
- Carlos Rosas – composer
- David Sebastián Morales Sánchez – viola
- Roberto Sanchez – assistant engineer
- Curt Schneider – mezcla
- Rosino Serrano – string arrangements
- Anayantzi Oropeza Silva – viola
- Manahem Jedidías Abisai Fuentes Solana – violin
- José Ramón Solano – engineer
- Joanna Téllez Sossa – arpa
- Roy Tavare – composer
- Francisco Raúl Silva Torres – violin
- Claudia Belén Ríos Trujillo – violin
- Carlos Rafael Aguilar Uscanga – violin
- Edy Vega – bateria
- Abraham Velázquez Aguilar – viola
- Rafa Vergara – arreglos, composer, coros, engineer, programming, string arrangements
- Dan Warner – engineer, guitar, guitar (acoustic), guitar (electric)
- Eric Weaver – assistant engineer

== Chart performance ==
Chart (2013)	Peak position
Mexican Albums Chart	3
U.S. Billboard Top Latin Albums	56
U.S. Billboard Latin Pop Albums	9

== Release history ==
Region	Date	Label
Latinoamerica	July 16, 2013	Sony Music Latin
United States	July 30, 2013	Sony Music Latin
