= Christian Chávez =

Mexican singer and actor

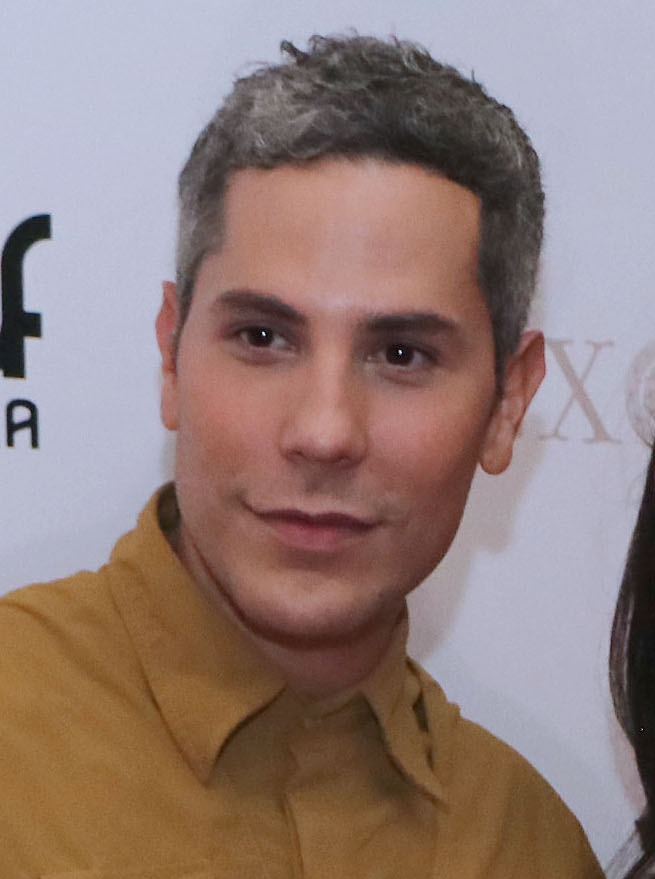
- Chávez in 2022
- Born: José Christian Chávez Garza; 7 August 1983 (age 43); Reynosa, Tamaulipas, Mexico
- Occupations: Singer; songwriter; actor
- Years active: 2002–present
- Spouse: William John Murphy (m. 2005; div. 2009)
- Musical career
- Genres: Pop; Latin pop
- Instrument: Vocals
- Formerly of: RBD

José Christian Chávez Garza (Spanish pronunciation: [xoˈse ˈkɾistjan ˈtʃaβes ˈɣaɾsa]; born 7 August 1983) is a Mexican singer and actor. He is best known for his role as Giovanni Méndez López in the telenovela Rebelde, as well as for being a member of the spin-off pop group RBD.

== Career ==
In 2002, Chávez was cast as Fernando 'Fercho' Lucena in the telenovela Clase 406. The series had four seasons and 350 one-hour episodes in total.

In 2004, Chávez joined a new telenovela Rebelde as one of the lead characters, Juan "Giovanni" Méndez López, a mischievous and rebellious student at a private boarding school in Mexico. Chávez became widely known for his ever-changing hair colors.

The success of Rebelde launched RBD composed of Chávez, Anahí, Dulce María, Christopher von Uckermann, Maite Perroni, and Alfonso Herrera. The group made 9 studio albums, including records in Spanish, Portuguese and English. To date, they have sold over 20 million albums worldwide, and toured across Mexico, South America, Serbia, Romania, the United States, and Spain. On August 15, 2008, RBD released a message telling fans that they had decided to split up. They went on one final tour, Gira Del Adios World Tour which ended in 2008. To this day, RBD is considered the most successful pop group in Mexican history.

In June 2007, Chávez briefly appeared in the stage shows Hoy No Me Puedo Levantar, and in May 2008 he participated in Avenida Q (the Mexican version of Avenue Q), where he played the main puppet characters Eugenio (Princeton) and Rodrigo (Rod); his presence on the shows was intended to be one of the main box office attractions.

After RBD's breakup, Chávez launched his career as a solo recording artist. His first studio album, Almas Transparentes, peaked at number 56 on the Mexican pop charts.

In April 2011, Chávez released the provocative music video for his single "Libertad", featuring former co-star Anahí, which became an instant sensation on YouTube with more than 1,000,000 views within three days of its upload. The video featured Chávez in a church confessional telling a priest he was not sorry for his sexual preference; it featured a cameo by Perez Hilton. "The video looks super sexy", Hilton gushed on his blog. "It's inspired us to unleash our own LIBERTAD." "Libertad" continues to be an anthem for the gay youth throughout Latin America.

On August 14, 2012, Chávez released the highly anticipated album Esencial, an acoustic compilation of songs performed at his show in São Paulo, Brazil in January 2012. People en Español called the release of his single, Sacrilégio, "the return of Christian Chávez". A red carpet presentation of Esencial was held in Mexico City in June. Chávez performed duets with RBD co-star Maite Perroni and Mexican pop/rock singer Ana Victoria.

"Sacrilegio", a track on Esencial also released as a single, immediately landed in the top 10 on Mexican pop charts. Other notable songs on the album include "No Me Olvides", written for Chávez by Mexican singer Juan Gabriel, and a remake of "¿En Donde Estas?" sung as a duet with Indonesian pop star Agnes Monica.

A DVD version of Esencial was released in late 2012.

In 2016, Chávez appeared on the telenovela Despertar contigo, marking his first telenovela role since Rebelde. In addition, Chavez revealed he was recording new music.

In October 2020, Chávez Participated on the Reality Show of the Spanish Version of “The Masked Singer”, ¿Quién es la máscara? on the 2nd Season as a Black Panther, and was eliminated on the 4th Episode.

In 2020, Chávez appeared on Netflix's Original Serie The House of Flowers as a supporting role character, "Pato Lascurain".

== Personal life ==
=== Coming out ===
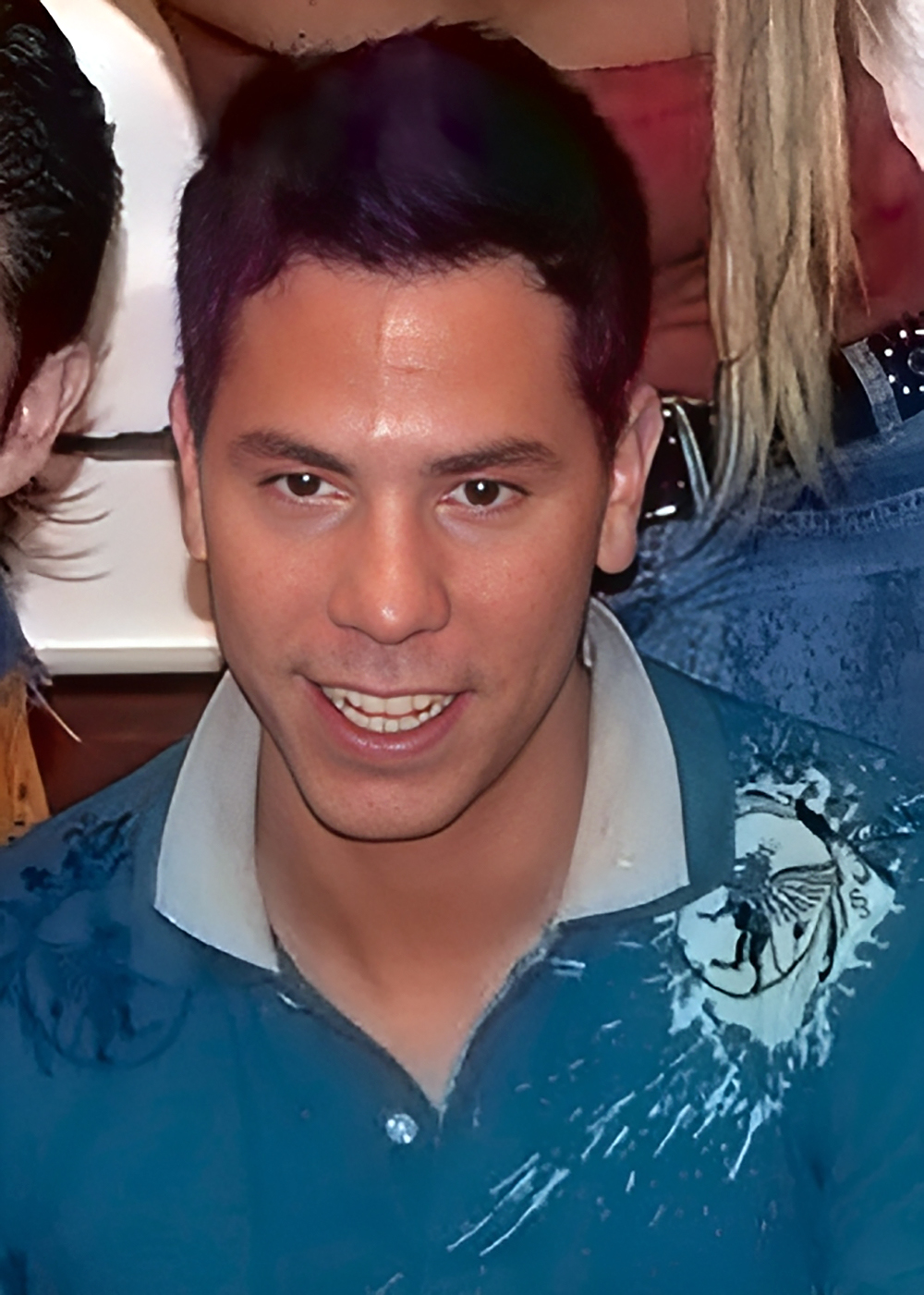
Chávez in 2006

In March 2007, a magazine published pictures of Chávez signing documents and exchanging rings with another man, allegedly his Canadian boyfriend (later identified as B.J. Murphy), outing Chávez with them. The pictures had been taken in 2005, the year in which same-sex marriages became legal in Canada. There was significant speculation over how the photos were obtained as the ceremony had only included immediate family.

Chávez, who in October 2006 denied rumors of homosexuality, declared in March 2007, in a message posted on RBD's website, that the photos showed a part of him that he had not been willing to discuss previously.

The message, interpreted by many reports as Chavez's official decision to come out of the closet, made international headlines due to Mexico's traditionally conservative roots. Chavez is described as the first high-profile figure in Mexican showbiz to come out.

In an interview with Televisa approximately three months after his coming out, Chávez said the decision allowed him to "begin a healing process in which I left things behind and began many wonderful things."

=== Legal and personal troubles ===
In April 2007, People en Español published a report claiming that Chavez and then-husband BJ Murphy maintained a physically abusive relationship, which Chávez denied.

In May 2007, Chávez was arrested for allegedly buying marijuana in New York City. Chavez subsequently apologized.

In 2009, Chávez confirmed he and Murphy were seeking a divorce. The reason for their separation had been the subject of much speculation, but Chávez insisted that their relationship did not end on bad terms: "[Murphy] is a person I love and respect; I also admire him as a professional."

In March 2012, Chávez confirmed he was dating Los Angeles real estate agent Ben Kruger after photos of them together were published in the tabloid TV Notas and later People en Español.

In late April 2013, Chávez, by then broken up with Kruger, was arrested along with Kruger in their Beverly Hills apartment for alleged domestic violence. This followed an incident in February that same year, where Chávez was accused of throwing a cinder block through a skylight at the apartment. Charges related to the late April incident were later dropped due to lack of evidence, as Chávez and Kruger placed blame on each other.

In October 2013, Chávez published multiple pictures on his Twitter account showing his bloodied wrists in what appeared to be a suicide attempt. Chavez reportedly immediately returned to Mexico from Los Angeles to enter a rehabilitation program. On October 10, 2013, Chávez released a video of himself which was uploaded to his YouTube channel, where he explained that he had attempted to commit suicide, and the photos he had uploaded were real.

In the aftermath of the suicide attempt, Latin Times released a letter purportedly written by Kruger, describing what happened that led to his highly publicized arrest with Chávez a few months prior. Among other things, Kruger accused Chávez of numerous instances of lying and infidelity, and also accused members of the media of collusion with Chavez and failing to provide fair coverage. In addition, Kruger claimed that Chavez was still married to Murphy for the duration of Chávez's relationship with Kruger, as Chávez lacked sufficient financial resources to initiate divorce proceedings.

In 2015, Chávez revealed that, shortly after he uploaded the photos, his former bandmate and close friend Anahí rushed to his apartment and "saved his life".

In 2020, Dutch makeup artist Maico Kemper also came forward with domestic violence allegations stating he ended their relationship after a heated argument in which Christian smashed a bottle of tequila over his head and he lost consciousness. Photos of the injury were released in the media. Christian denied the allegations and accused Kemper of slander.

== Awards and recognition ==
In 2010, Chávez was recognized as one of People en Español's 50 most beautiful.

During the 22nd GLAAD Media Awards in 2011, Chávez received an award for Outstanding Spanish-Language Music Artist for his album Almas Transparentes.

== Filmography ==
=== Television ===
Year	Title	Role	Notes
2002–03	Clase 406	Fernando 'Fercho' Lucena	Main role; Soap opera
2004–06	Rebelde	Giovanni Méndez López	Main role; Soap opera
2007	RBD: La Familia	Chris	Main role; TV series
2009–10	Hasta que el dinero nos separe	Sergio	Telenovela
2012	Fixing Paco	Daniel	TV series
2016	Despertar contigo	Christian	Telenovela
2018	Rosario Tijeras	Mateo Prieto 'El Guarro'	TV series, telenovela
2018	Like	Gabo	Main role; Telenovela
2020	La Casa de las Flores	Patricio "Pato" Lascuráin	Netflix TV series
2020	Cómo Sobrevivir Soltero	Christian	Amazon Prime
2021	Madre sólo hay dos	Manolo	Netflix TV series
2021	La suerte de Loli	Matías	Telemundo
2023	Drag Race México	Himself/guest judge	MTV/Paramount+
2026	Bodas S.A.	Guillermo Maximiliano "Memomax"	

=== Reality show ===
Year	Title	Role
2014	Top Chef Estrellas	Himself (contestant)
2014	Esse Artista Sou Eu	Himself (contestant)

Esse Artista Sou Eu performances

Episode	Artist covered	Song	Result
1	Ricky Martin	"Livin' La Vida Loca"	Safe
2	Village People	"YMCA ft. Macho Man"	Safe
3	Justin Timberlake	"SexyBack"	Safe
4	Psy	"Gangnam Style"	Safe
5	John Lennon	"Imagine"	Safe
6	Michael Jackson	"Billie Jean"	Safe
7	MC Guimê	"Na Pista Eu Arraso"	Safe
8	Lady Gaga	"Bad Romance"	Safe
9	Luciano Pavarotti	"Caruso"	Safe
10	Pharrell Williams	"Happy"	Safe
11	Thalía	"María la del Barrio"	Safe
12	Mick Jagger	"Satisfaction"	Safe
13	Alejandro Sanz	"Corazón Partío"	Safe
14	One Direction	"What Makes You Beautiful"	Safe
15	Marilyn Manson	"Sweet Dreams (Are Made of This)"	Safe
16	The Black Eyed Peas	"Boom Boom Pow"	Safe
17	Boy George	"Karma Chameleon"	Safe
18	Cee Lo Green	"Fuck You"	Third place

== Discography ==
=== Studio album ===
- 2010: Almas Transparentes

=== Extended play (EP) ===
- 2011: Libertad EP
- 2012: Esencial EP
- 2018: Conectado

=== Live album ===
- 2012: Esencial

=== Singles ===
- 2010: ¿En Dónde Estás?
- 2010: Almas Transparentes
- 2011: Libertad (con Anahí)
- 2012: Sacrilégio
- 2012: Mas Vale Tarde Que Nunca (con Ana Victoria)

== Tours ==
- Christian Pocket Show (2009)
- Libertad World Tour (2010 - 2011)

Leg 2010 — Americas
Date	City	Country	Venue
September 3	Sacramento	United States	Faces Nightclub
September 5	Los Angeles	United States	The Factory Nightclub
September 19	São Paulo	Brazil	HSBC Brasil
September 22	Rio de Janeiro	Brazil	Vivo Rio
September 30	Chicago	United States	Circuit Nightclub
October 1	Houston	United States	Crystal Nightclub
October 2	San Diego	United States	Rich’s Nightclub
October 3	Seattle	United States	Neighbours Nightclub
December 1	Buenos Aires	Argentina	Luna Park
Leg 2011 — Americas
Date	City	Country	Venue
March 26	São Paulo	Brazil	Via Funchal
March 27	Rio de Janeiro	Brazil	Vivo Rio
March 29	Porto Alegre	Brazil	Opinião
March 31	Santos	Brazil	Capital Disco
April 1	Pernambuco	Brazil	The Pub
April 2	Fortaleza	Brazil	Hotel Tropical
May 12	Mexico City	Mexico	Centro Banamex
June 26	San Francisco	United States	The Castro
July 23	Monterrey	Mexico	Roomies Club

- Esencial Tour (2012)
- Para Siempre Tour (2026)

The longest tour by an international artist in Brazil
Leg 1 — South America
Date	City	Country	Venue	Opening act
January 21	João Pessoa	Brazil	Intermares Hall	
January 23	Manaus	Brazil	Teatro Manuara	
January 25	Belém	Brazil	Teatro Resolve	
January 27	Fortaleza	Brazil	Teatro Riomar Fortaleza	
January 28	Recife	Brazil	Teatro Riomar Recife	
January 29	Salvador	Brazil	Teatro Faresi	
January 31	Brasília	Brazil	Teatro Royal Tulip	
February 1	Goiânia	Brazil	Teatro Madre Esperança Garrido	
February 4	Campinas	Brazil	Teatro Oficina do Estudante Iguatemi	
February 6	São Paulo	Brazil	Teatro Bradesco	
February 7	Rio de Janeiro	Brazil	Teatro Opus Città	
February 8	Belo Horizonte	Brazil	Cine Theatro Brasil	
February 11	Porto Alegre	Brazil	Teatro Amrigs	
February 12	Curitiba	Brazil	Teatro Fernanda Montenegro	
Leg 2 — South America
August 21	Belo Horizonte	Brazil	Cine Theatro Brasil	Leon Leiden / Sabina Hidalgo
August 23	Goiânia	Brazil	Teatro Madre Esperança Garrido	Leon Leiden / Sabina Hidalgo
August 26	Rio de Janeiro	Brazil	Teatro Clara Nunes	Leon Leiden / Sabina Hidalgo
August 28	São Paulo	Brazil	Audio	Leon Leiden / Sabina Hidalgo
