= Andrés Cuervo =

Colombian singer-songwriter (1982–2022)

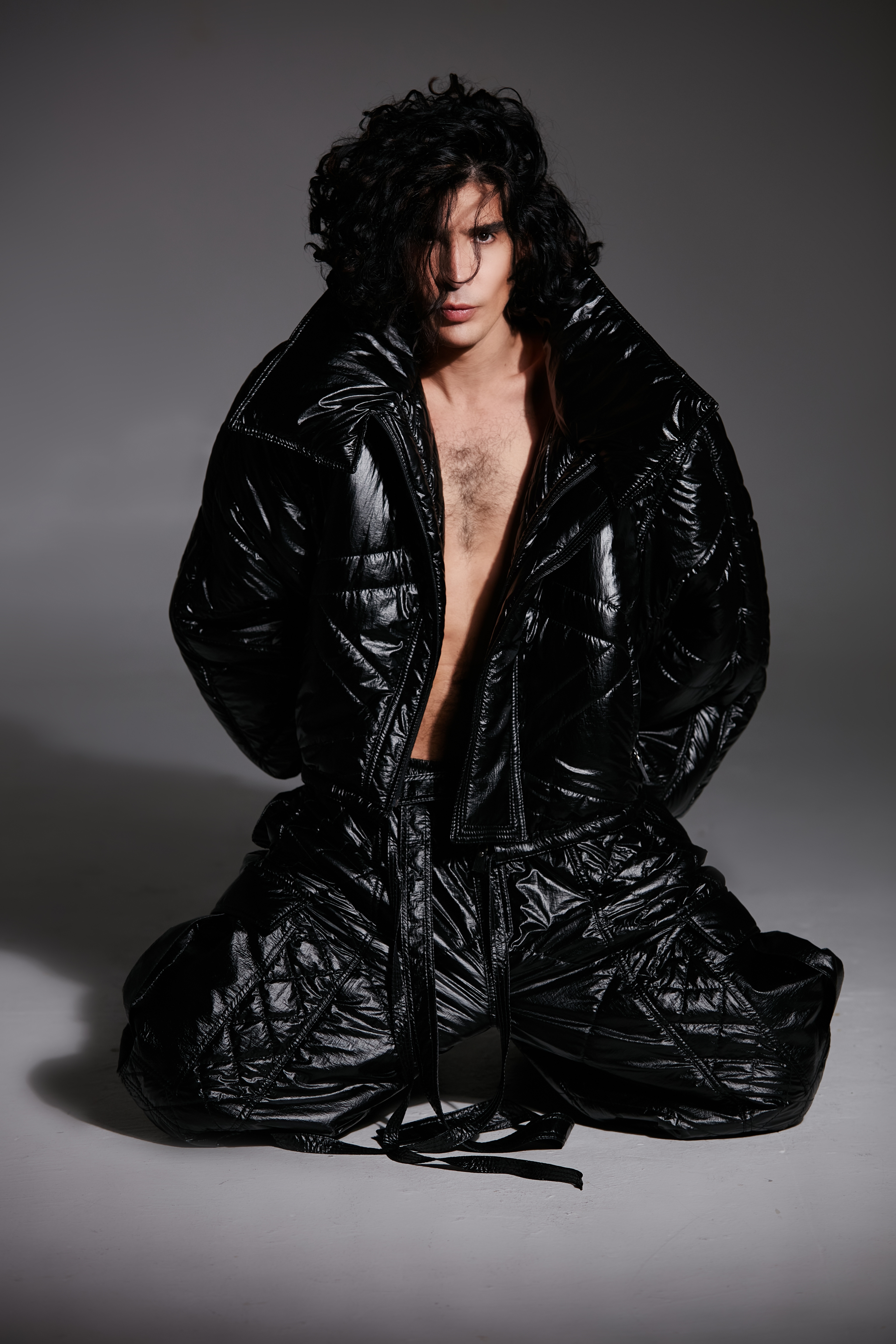

Background information
- Born: 15 April 1982; Barranquilla, Colombia
- Died: 9 October 2022 (aged 40) Paris, France
- Genres: Latin pop
- Instruments: vocals

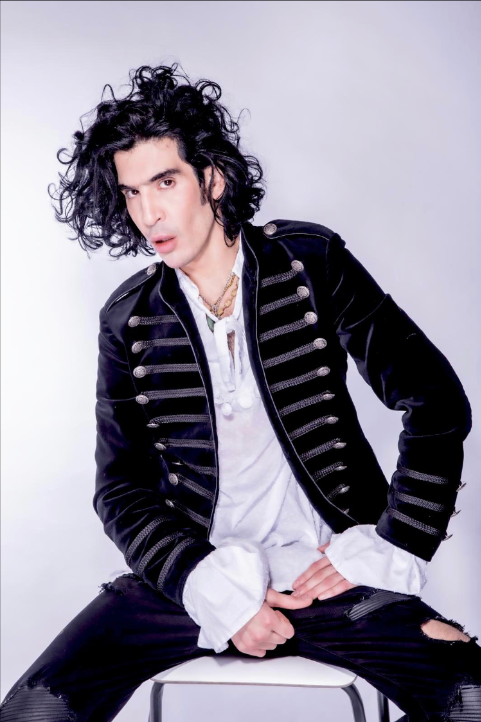
Cuervo in 2020

Andrés Cuervo (15 April 1982 – 9 October 2022) was a Colombian singer-songwriter and model for the brand Army of Peace and Love. Born and raised in Barranquilla, he began performing in school, demonstrating pop and rock and roll influences and songwriting abilities.

Cuervo released his first studio album, Tras de Ti, in 2008, spawning a No. 1 hit in Mexico. His next album, Este Soy Yo, was released in 2013 and featured numerous top ten hits on Mexican and Spanish radio and a successful tour of the country. In February 2015 Cuervo released his album "Historias de Amor", debuting a video for the single "Como Yo Te Quiero" on St. Valentine's Day; both releases were among his most successful.

His single, "La Receta", hit No. 1 in the U.S on the Billboard Tropical charts. An English version, "The Cure", was released simultaneously, heralding a crossover for the artist. In March 2018 Cuervo released the single "Vivirla Bien", which peaked at No. 18 on Billboard's Tropical List. The official video for the track generated over 11 million views on YouTube, making it the most viewed video of the artist"s musical career.

His videos have garnered over 40 million views on YouTube, which features music videos for singles such as "Te Extraño", "Destino Casualidad", "Luna Cuentale", and "Te Quiero Para Mi". In addition to his recording accomplishments, Cuervo successfully raised funds and awareness for various causes via his charitable foundation "Saber Amar", work which has been recognized with numerous awards.

Cuervo lived and recorded in Miami Beach, Florida. He died in Paris on 9 October 2022, at the age of 40.
