= Sin Ti (Samo song) =

Single by Samo

from the album Inevitable
- Released: May 18, 2013
- Recorded: 2013
- Genre: Pop
- Length: 4:27
- Label: Sony Music
- Songwriters: Edgar Barrera, Andrés Castro, Samo
- Producers: Andrés Castro, Edgar Barrera

Samo singles chronology
"Sin Ti" (2013)	"Inevitable" (2013)

Music video
- "Sin Ti" on YouTube

"Sin Ti" (English: "Without You") is a song by Mexican singer Samo from his first studio album Inevitable. It was revealed that the song is the first single from the album released on May 27, 2013, on radio, and digitally on July 16, 2013.

== Track listing ==
iTunes digital single

No.	Title	Writer(s)	Producer(s)	Length
1.	"Sin Ti"	Edgar Barrera, Andrés Castro, Samo	Andrés Castro, Edgar Barrera	4:27

== Music video ==
The video was filmed in his native Veracruz, on the beach Chachalacas, and was under the direction of Ricardo Calderón. The filming lasted two days and each day began before dawn to capture these images early. On June 6, 2013, the singer posted on his official Twitter "We continue the video recording #Sinti. In which place do you believe that it is being recorded? :)". The video was released on July 30, 2013, on his official VEVO account.

== Charts and certifications ==
=== Weekly charts ===
Chart (2013)	Peak position
US Latin Pop Songs (Billboard)	24
US Hot Latin Songs (Billboard)	35
US Latin Airplay (Billboard)	36
US Top AC/Pop (Monitor Latino)	16
Mexican Espanol Airplay (Billboard)	1
Mexico Top Pop (Monitor Latino)	1
Mexico Top General (Monitor Latino)	9

=== Certifications ===
Region	Certification	Certified units/sales
Mexico (AMPROFON)	Gold	30,000^{*}
^{*} Sales figures based on certification alone.

=== Year-end charts ===
Chart (2013)	Position
Mexico (Mexito Top 100)	51

== Radio and release history ==
Country	Date	Format	Label
Worldwide	May 18, 2013	Radio Premiere	Sony Music
Worldwide	Digital download	July 16, 2013	Sony Music
